= 2024 WTA 125 tournaments =

Women's tennis circuit

Details
- Duration: 1 January – 15 December 2024
- Edition: 13th
- Tournaments: 36

Achievements (singles)
- Most titles: (United States) Alycia Parks (3)
- Most finals: (Egypt) Mayar Sherif (5)

The WTA 125 tournaments were the secondary professional tennis circuit tournaments organised by the Women's Tennis Association. The 2024 calendar consisted of thirty-six tournaments.

== Schedule ==
Week of	Tournament	Champions	Runners-up	Semifinalists	Quarterfinalists
January 1	Workday Canberra International; Canberra, Australia; Hard – $164,000 – 32S/32Q/16D; Singles – Doubles	(Spain) Nuria Párrizas Díaz; 6–4, 6–3	(United Kingdom) Harriet Dart	(Denmark) Clara Tauson (United States) Katie Volynets	(Australia) Maya Joint (France) Océane Dodin (Hungary) Anna Bondár (Japan) Nao Hibino
January 1	Workday Canberra International; Canberra, Australia; Hard – $164,000 – 32S/32Q/16D; Singles – Doubles	(Slovenia) Veronika Erjavec (Latvia) Darja Semeņistaja; 6–2, 6–4	(Australia) Kaylah McPhee (Australia) Astra Sharma	(Denmark) Clara Tauson (United States) Katie Volynets	(Australia) Maya Joint (France) Océane Dodin (Hungary) Anna Bondár (Japan) Nao Hibino
February 5	L&T Mumbai Open; Mumbai, India; Hard – $115,000 – 32S/24Q/16D; Singles – Doubles	(Latvia) Darja Semeņistaja; 5–7, 7–6^{(8–6)}, 6–2	(Australia) Storm Hunter	(Netherlands) Arianne Hartono (United States) Katie Volynets	Polina Kudermetova (Japan) Moyuka Uchijima (South Korea) Park So-hyun; Alina Korneeva
February 5	L&T Mumbai Open; Mumbai, India; Hard – $115,000 – 32S/24Q/16D; Singles – Doubles	(Slovenia) Dalila Jakupović (United States) Sabrina Santamaria; 6–4, 6–3	(Netherlands) Arianne Hartono (India) Prarthana Thombare	(Netherlands) Arianne Hartono (United States) Katie Volynets	Polina Kudermetova (Japan) Moyuka Uchijima (South Korea) Park So-hyun; Alina Korneeva
February 19	Mexico Series Puerto Vallarta 125; Puerto Vallarta, Mexico; Hard – $115,000 – 32S/16Q/8D; Singles – Doubles	(United States) McCartney Kessler; 5–7, 6–3, 6–0	(Australia) Taylah Preston	(Argentina) María Lourdes Carlé (United States) Hailey Baptiste	(Ukraine) Yuliia Starodubtseva (Spain) Jéssica Bouzas Maneiro (United States) Robin Montgomery (France) Léolia Jeanjean
February 19	Mexico Series Puerto Vallarta 125; Puerto Vallarta, Mexico; Hard – $115,000 – 32S/16Q/8D; Singles – Doubles	Iryna Shymanovich (Mexico) Renata Zarazúa; 6–2, 7–6^{(7–1)}	(Italy) Angelica Moratelli (Italy) Camilla Rosatello	(Argentina) María Lourdes Carlé (United States) Hailey Baptiste	(Ukraine) Yuliia Starodubtseva (Spain) Jéssica Bouzas Maneiro (United States) Robin Montgomery (France) Léolia Jeanjean
March 11	Fifth Third Charleston 125; Charleston, United States; Hard – $115,000 – 32S/16Q/16D; Singles – Doubles	(Italy) Elisabetta Cocciaretto; 6–3, 6–2	Diana Shnaider	(China) Wang Yafan (Belgium) Greet Minnen	Erika Andreeva (France) Océane Dodin (United States) McCartney Kessler (Spain) Rebeka Masarova
March 11	Fifth Third Charleston 125; Charleston, United States; Hard – $115,000 – 32S/16Q/16D; Singles – Doubles	(Australia) Olivia Gadecki (United Kingdom) Olivia Nicholls; 6–2, 6–1	(Italy) Sara Errani (Slovakia) Tereza Mihalíková	(China) Wang Yafan (Belgium) Greet Minnen	Erika Andreeva (France) Océane Dodin (United States) McCartney Kessler (Spain) Rebeka Masarova
March 25	San Luis Open; San Luis Potosí, Mexico; Clay – $115,000 – 32S/8Q/16D; Singles – Doubles	(Argentina) Nadia Podoroska; 6–1, 6–2	(United Kingdom) Francesca Jones	(Argentina) Julia Riera (Italy) Elisabetta Cocciaretto	(United States) Robin Montgomery (Netherlands) Suzan Lamens (Italy) Lucrezia Stefanini (Brazil) Laura Pigossi
March 25	San Luis Open; San Luis Potosí, Mexico; Clay – $115,000 – 32S/8Q/16D; Singles – Doubles	(Hungary) Anna Bondár (Slovenia) Tamara Zidanšek; Walkover	(Brazil) Laura Pigossi (Poland) Katarzyna Piter	(Argentina) Julia Riera (Italy) Elisabetta Cocciaretto	(United States) Robin Montgomery (Netherlands) Suzan Lamens (Italy) Lucrezia Stefanini (Brazil) Laura Pigossi
March 25	Megasaray Hotels Open; Antalya, Turkey; Clay – $115,000 – 32S/16Q/16D; Singles – Doubles	(Spain) Jéssica Bouzas Maneiro; 6–2, 4–6, 6–2	(Romania) Irina-Camelia Begu	(Switzerland) Simona Waltert (Japan) Moyuka Uchijima	(Serbia) Olga Danilović; Polina Kudermetova (Slovenia) Polona Hercog (Turkey) Zeynep Sönmez
March 25	Megasaray Hotels Open; Antalya, Turkey; Clay – $115,000 – 32S/16Q/16D; Singles – Doubles	(Italy) Angelica Moratelli (Italy) Camilla Rosatello; 6–3, 3–6, [15–13]	(Hungary) Tímea Babos; Vera Zvonareva	(Switzerland) Simona Waltert (Japan) Moyuka Uchijima	(Serbia) Olga Danilović; Polina Kudermetova (Slovenia) Polona Hercog (Turkey) Zeynep Sönmez
April 1	Open Internacional Femení Solgironès; La Bisbal d'Empordà, Spain; Clay – $115,000 – 32S/8Q/8D; Singles – Doubles	(Argentina) María Lourdes Carlé; 3–6, 6–1, 6–2	(Spain) Rebeka Masarova	(Serbia) Olga Danilović (Hungary) Dalma Gálfi	(Slovakia) Rebecca Šramková (France) Elsa Jacquemot; Oksana Selekhmeteva (Turkey) Zeynep Sönmez
April 1	Open Internacional Femení Solgironès; La Bisbal d'Empordà, Spain; Clay – $115,000 – 32S/8Q/8D; Singles – Doubles	(Czech Republic) Miriam Kolodziejová (Czech Republic) Anna Sisková; Walkover	(Hungary) Tímea Babos (Hungary) Dalma Gálfi	(Serbia) Olga Danilović (Hungary) Dalma Gálfi	(Slovakia) Rebecca Šramková (France) Elsa Jacquemot; Oksana Selekhmeteva (Turkey) Zeynep Sönmez
April 15	Oeiras Ladies Open; Oeiras, Portugal; Clay – $164,000 – 32S/16Q/16D; Singles – Doubles	(Netherlands) Suzan Lamens; 6–4, 5–7, 6–4	(Denmark) Clara Tauson	(United States) Bernarda Pera (France) Kristina Mladenovic	(Portugal) Francisca Jorge (Portugal) Matilde Jorge; Aliona Falei (United States) Varvara Lepchenko
April 15	Oeiras Ladies Open; Oeiras, Portugal; Clay – $164,000 – 32S/16Q/16D; Singles – Doubles	(Portugal) Francisca Jorge (Portugal) Matilde Jorge; 6–0, 6–4	(United Kingdom) Harriet Dart (France) Kristina Mladenovic	(United States) Bernarda Pera (France) Kristina Mladenovic	(Portugal) Francisca Jorge (Portugal) Matilde Jorge; Aliona Falei (United States) Varvara Lepchenko
April 29	L'Open 35 de Saint-Malo; Saint-Malo, France; Clay – $115,000 – 32S/14Q/16D; Singles – Doubles	(France) Loïs Boisson; 4–6, 7–6^{(7–3)}, 6–3	(France) Chloé Paquet	(Switzerland) Céline Naef (France) Alizé Cornet	(France) Clara Burel (United States) Peyton Stearns (United States) Katie Volynets (France) Jessika Ponchet
April 29	L'Open 35 de Saint-Malo; Saint-Malo, France; Clay – $115,000 – 32S/14Q/16D; Singles – Doubles	Amina Anshba (Czech Republic) Anastasia Dețiuc; 7–6^{(9–7)}, 2–6, [10–5]	(France) Estelle Cascino (France) Carole Monnet	(Switzerland) Céline Naef (France) Alizé Cornet	(France) Clara Burel (United States) Peyton Stearns (United States) Katie Volynets (France) Jessika Ponchet
April 29	Catalonia Open WTA 125; Lleida, Spain; Clay – $115,000 – 32S/16Q/16D; Singles – Doubles	(Czech Republic) Kateřina Siniaková; 6–4, 4–6, 6–3	(Egypt) Mayar Sherif	(Spain) Guiomar Maristany (Colombia) Camila Osorio	(United States) Emma Navarro (Netherlands) Arantxa Rus (Poland) Magdalena Fręch (United States) Ashlyn Krueger
April 29	Catalonia Open WTA 125; Lleida, Spain; Clay – $115,000 – 32S/16Q/16D; Singles – Doubles	(United States) Nicole Melichar-Martinez (Australia) Ellen Perez; 7–5, 6–2	(Poland) Katarzyna Piter (Egypt) Mayar Sherif	(Spain) Guiomar Maristany (Colombia) Camila Osorio	(United States) Emma Navarro (Netherlands) Arantxa Rus (Poland) Magdalena Fręch (United States) Ashlyn Krueger
May 13	Trophée Clarins; Paris, France; Clay – $115,000 – 32S/8Q/8D; Singles – Doubles	Diana Shnaider; 6–2, 3–6, 6–4	(United States) Emma Navarro	(Romania) Elena-Gabriela Ruse (France) Varvara Gracheva	(France) Fiona Ferro (France) Alizé Cornet; Erika Andreeva (United Kingdom) Katie Boulter
May 13	Trophée Clarins; Paris, France; Clay – $115,000 – 32S/8Q/8D; Singles – Doubles	(United States) Asia Muhammad (Indonesia) Aldila Sutjiadi; 7–6^{(7–3)}, 4–6, [11–9]	(Romania) Monica Niculescu (China) Zhu Lin	(Romania) Elena-Gabriela Ruse (France) Varvara Gracheva	(France) Fiona Ferro (France) Alizé Cornet; Erika Andreeva (United Kingdom) Katie Boulter
May 13	Parma Ladies Open; Parma, Italy; Clay – $115,000 – 32S/8Q/10D; Singles – Doubles	(Slovakia) Anna Karolína Schmiedlová; 7–5, 2–6, 6–4	(Egypt) Mayar Sherif	(Mexico) Renata Zarazúa (Germany) Jule Niemeier	(United States) Peyton Stearns; Kamilla Rakhimova (Czech Republic) Jesika Malečková (Turkey) Zeynep Sönmez
May 13	Parma Ladies Open; Parma, Italy; Clay – $115,000 – 32S/8Q/10D; Singles – Doubles	(Kazakhstan) Anna Danilina; Irina Khromacheva; 6–1, 6–2	(France) Elixane Lechemia (Brazil) Ingrid Martins	(Mexico) Renata Zarazúa (Germany) Jule Niemeier	(United States) Peyton Stearns; Kamilla Rakhimova (Czech Republic) Jesika Malečková (Turkey) Zeynep Sönmez
June 3	Makarska Open; Makarska, Croatia; Clay – $115,000 – 32S/8Q/8D; Singles – Doubles	(United States) Katie Volynets; 3–6, 6–2, 6–1	(Egypt) Mayar Sherif	(China) Wang Xiyu (Croatia) Petra Martić	(France) Léolia Jeanjean (Czech Republic) Brenda Fruhvirtová (Australia) Maya Joint (Japan) Nao Hibino
June 3	Makarska Open; Makarska, Croatia; Clay – $115,000 – 32S/8Q/8D; Singles – Doubles	(United States) Sabrina Santamaria; Iryna Shymanovich; 6–4, 3–6, [10–6]	(Japan) Nao Hibino (Georgia (country)) Oksana Kalashnikova	(China) Wang Xiyu (Croatia) Petra Martić	(France) Léolia Jeanjean (Czech Republic) Brenda Fruhvirtová (Australia) Maya Joint (Japan) Nao Hibino
June 3	Open delle Puglie; Bari, Italy; Clay – $115,000 – 32S/8Q/8D; Singles – Doubles	(Romania) Anca Todoni; 6–4, 6–0	(Hungary) Panna Udvardy	(Argentina) Nadia Podoroska (Slovenia) Tamara Zidanšek	(Italy) Beatrice Ricci (Germany) Eva Lys (Italy) Martina Trevisan (Mexico) Renata Zarazúa
June 3	Open delle Puglie; Bari, Italy; Clay – $115,000 – 32S/8Q/8D; Singles – Doubles	(Kazakhstan) Anna Danilina; Irina Khromacheva; 6–1, 6–3	(Italy) Angelica Moratelli (Mexico) Renata Zarazúa	(Argentina) Nadia Podoroska (Slovenia) Tamara Zidanšek	(Italy) Beatrice Ricci (Germany) Eva Lys (Italy) Martina Trevisan (Mexico) Renata Zarazúa
June 10	BBVA Open Internacional de Valencia; Valencia, Spain; Clay – $115,000 – 32S/16Q/8D; Singles – Doubles	(United States) Ann Li; 6–3, 6–4	(Bulgaria) Viktoriya Tomova	Iryna Shymanovich (Spain) Jéssica Bouzas Maneiro	(Latvia) Darja Semeņistaja (Brazil) Laura Pigossi (United States) Elvina Kalieva (Spain) Marina Bassols Ribera
June 10	BBVA Open Internacional de Valencia; Valencia, Spain; Clay – $115,000 – 32S/16Q/8D; Singles – Doubles	(Poland) Katarzyna Piter (Hungary) Fanny Stollár; 6–1, 4–6, [10–8]	(Italy) Angelica Moratelli (Mexico) Renata Zarazúa	Iryna Shymanovich (Spain) Jéssica Bouzas Maneiro	(Latvia) Darja Semeņistaja (Brazil) Laura Pigossi (United States) Elvina Kalieva (Spain) Marina Bassols Ribera
June 17	Veneto Open; Gaiba, Italy; Grass – $115,000 – 32S/8Q/8D; Singles – Doubles	(United States) Alycia Parks; 6–3, 6–1	(United States) Bernarda Pera	(Switzerland) Susan Bandecchi (Italy) Sara Errani	(India) Ankita Raina (United States) Robin Montgomery (Philippines) Alexandra Eala; Kamilla Rakhimova
June 17	Veneto Open; Gaiba, Italy; Grass – $115,000 – 32S/8Q/8D; Singles – Doubles	(United States) Hailey Baptiste (United States) Alycia Parks; 7–6^{(7–4)}, 6–2	(Czech Republic) Miriam Kolodziejová (Czech Republic) Anna Sisková	(Switzerland) Susan Bandecchi (Italy) Sara Errani	(India) Ankita Raina (United States) Robin Montgomery (Philippines) Alexandra Eala; Kamilla Rakhimova
July 8	Nordea Open; Båstad, Sweden; Clay – $115,000 – 32S/16D; Singles – Doubles	(Italy) Martina Trevisan; 6–2, 6–2	(United States) Ann Li	(United States) Louisa Chirico (Spain) Nuria Párrizas Díaz	(France) Diane Parry (Ukraine) Katarina Zavatska (Germany) Tamara Korpatsch (Poland) Katarzyna Kawa
July 8	Nordea Open; Båstad, Sweden; Clay – $115,000 – 32S/16D; Singles – Doubles	(Thailand) Peangtarn Plipuech (Chinese Taipei) Tsao Chia-yi; 7–5, 6–3	(Argentina) María Lourdes Carlé (Argentina) Julia Riera	(United States) Louisa Chirico (Spain) Nuria Párrizas Díaz	(France) Diane Parry (Ukraine) Katarina Zavatska (Germany) Tamara Korpatsch (Poland) Katarzyna Kawa
July 8	Grand Est Open 88; Contrexéville, France; Clay – $115,000 – 32S/12Q/8D; Singles – Doubles	(Italy) Lucia Bronzetti; 6–4, 6–7^{(4–7)}, 7–5	(Egypt) Mayar Sherif	(China) Gao Xinyu (France) Séléna Janicijevic	(France) Margaux Rouvroy (France) Elsa Jacquemot (Colombia) Emiliana Arango (Slovenia) Dalila Jakupović
July 8	Grand Est Open 88; Contrexéville, France; Clay – $115,000 – 32S/12Q/8D; Singles – Doubles	(Georgia (country)) Oksana Kalashnikova; Iryna Shymanovich; 5–7, 6–3, [10–7]	(Chinese Taipei) Wu Fang-hsien (China) Zhang Shuai	(China) Gao Xinyu (France) Séléna Janicijevic	(France) Margaux Rouvroy (France) Elsa Jacquemot (Colombia) Emiliana Arango (Slovenia) Dalila Jakupović
July 22	Polish Open; Warsaw, Poland; Hard – $115,000 – 32S/8Q/8D; Singles – Doubles	(United States) Alycia Parks; 4–6, 6–3, 6–3	(Australia) Maya Joint	(Poland) Maja Chwalińska (Switzerland) Leonie Küng	(Georgia (country)) Mariam Bolkvadze (Latvia) Darja Semeņistaja (Bulgaria) Isabella Shinikova (Israel) Lina Glushko
July 22	Polish Open; Warsaw, Poland; Hard – $115,000 – 32S/8Q/8D; Singles – Doubles	(Poland) Weronika Falkowska (Poland) Martyna Kubka; 6–4, 7–6^{(7–5)}	(Switzerland) Céline Naef (Serbia) Nina Stojanović	(Poland) Maja Chwalińska (Switzerland) Leonie Küng	(Georgia (country)) Mariam Bolkvadze (Latvia) Darja Semeņistaja (Bulgaria) Isabella Shinikova (Israel) Lina Glushko
August 5	ECE Ladies Hamburg Open; Hamburg, Germany; Clay – $115,000 – 32S/8Q/8D; Singles – Doubles	(Hungary) Anna Bondár; 6–4, 6–2	(Netherlands) Arantxa Rus	(Serbia) Olga Danilović (Romania) Elena-Gabriela Ruse	(Egypt) Mayar Sherif (Germany) Eva Lys; Polina Kudermetova (Germany) Tamara Korpatsch
August 5	ECE Ladies Hamburg Open; Hamburg, Germany; Clay – $115,000 – 32S/8Q/8D; Singles – Doubles	(Hungary) Anna Bondár (Belgium) Kimberley Zimmermann; 5–7, 6–3, [11–9]	(Netherlands) Arantxa Rus (Serbia) Nina Stojanović	(Serbia) Olga Danilović (Romania) Elena-Gabriela Ruse	(Egypt) Mayar Sherif (Germany) Eva Lys; Polina Kudermetova (Germany) Tamara Korpatsch
August 12	Barranquilla Open; Barranquilla, Colombia; Hard – $115,000 – 32S/10Q/8D; Singles – Doubles	(Argentina) Nadia Podoroska; 6–2, 1–6, 6–3	(Germany) Tatjana Maria	(Croatia) Antonia Ružić (Ukraine) Anastasiia Sobolieva	(Netherlands) Suzan Lamens (Argentina) Solana Sierra (Georgia (country)) Mariam Bolkvadze (Slovakia) Viktória Hrunčáková
August 12	Barranquilla Open; Barranquilla, Colombia; Hard – $115,000 – 32S/10Q/8D; Singles – Doubles	(United States) Jessica Failla (Japan) Hiroko Kuwata; 4–6, 7–6^{(7–2)}, [10–7]	(United States) Quinn Gleason (Brazil) Ingrid Martins	(Croatia) Antonia Ružić (Ukraine) Anastasiia Sobolieva	(Netherlands) Suzan Lamens (Argentina) Solana Sierra (Georgia (country)) Mariam Bolkvadze (Slovakia) Viktória Hrunčáková
September 2	Guadalajara 125 Open; Guadalajara, Mexico; Hard – $115,000 – 32S/8Q/8D; Singles – Doubles	Kamilla Rakhimova; 6–3, 6–7^{(5–7)}, 6–3	(Germany) Tatjana Maria	(Slovakia) Anna Karolína Schmiedlová (Colombia) Emiliana Arango	(United States) Emina Bektas (Australia) Olivia Gadecki (Canada) Rebecca Marino (Italy) Martina Trevisan
September 2	Guadalajara 125 Open; Guadalajara, Mexico; Hard – $115,000 – 32S/8Q/8D; Singles – Doubles	(Poland) Katarzyna Piter (Hungary) Fanny Stollár; 6–4, 7–5	(Italy) Angelica Moratelli (United States) Sabrina Santamaria	(Slovakia) Anna Karolína Schmiedlová (Colombia) Emiliana Arango	(United States) Emina Bektas (Australia) Olivia Gadecki (Canada) Rebecca Marino (Italy) Martina Trevisan
September 2	Montreux Nestlé Open; Montreux, Switzerland; Clay – $115,000 – 32S/16Q/8D; Singles – Doubles	(Romania) Irina-Camelia Begu; 1–6, 6–3, 6–0	(Croatia) Petra Marčinko	(Latvia) Darja Semeņistaja (Spain) Nuria Párrizas Díaz	(Romania) Anca Todoni; Polina Kudermetova (Switzerland) Jil Teichmann (Croatia) Tara Würth
September 2	Montreux Nestlé Open; Montreux, Switzerland; Clay – $115,000 – 32S/16Q/8D; Singles – Doubles	(United States) Quinn Gleason (Brazil) Ingrid Martins; 6–3, 4–6, [10–7]	(Argentina) María Lourdes Carlé (Switzerland) Simona Waltert	(Latvia) Darja Semeņistaja (Spain) Nuria Párrizas Díaz	(Romania) Anca Todoni; Polina Kudermetova (Switzerland) Jil Teichmann (Croatia) Tara Würth
September 9	Țiriac Foundation Trophy; Bucharest, Romania; Clay – $115,000 – 32S/16Q/8D; Singles – Doubles	(Romania) Miriam Bulgaru; 6–3, 1–6, 6–4	(Liechtenstein) Kathinka von Deichmann	(Romania) Patricia Maria Țig (Georgia (country)) Ekaterine Gorgodze	(Argentina) María Lourdes Carlé (Netherlands) Anouk Koevermans (Belgium) Marie Benoît; Alevtina Ibragimova
September 9	Țiriac Foundation Trophy; Bucharest, Romania; Clay – $115,000 – 32S/16Q/8D; Singles – Doubles	(France) Carole Monnet (Latvia) Darja Semeņistaja; 1–6, 6–2, [10–7]	(Spain) Aliona Bolsova (Poland) Katarzyna Kawa	(Romania) Patricia Maria Țig (Georgia (country)) Ekaterine Gorgodze	(Argentina) María Lourdes Carlé (Netherlands) Anouk Koevermans (Belgium) Marie Benoît; Alevtina Ibragimova
September 9	WTA Zavarovalnica Sava Ljubljana; Ljubljana, Slovenia; Clay – $115,000 – 32S/8Q/16D; Singles – Doubles	(Switzerland) Jil Teichmann; 7–6^{(10–8)}, 6–4	(Spain) Nuria Párrizas Díaz	(United Kingdom) Francesca Jones (Serbia) Olga Danilović	(Andorra) Victoria Jiménez Kasintseva; Kristina Dmitruk (Germany) Ella Seidel (Italy) Nuria Brancaccio
September 9	WTA Zavarovalnica Sava Ljubljana; Ljubljana, Slovenia; Clay – $115,000 – 32S/8Q/16D; Singles – Doubles	(Italy) Nuria Brancaccio (Spain) Leyre Romero Gormaz; 5–7, 7–5, [10–7]	(North Macedonia) Lina Gjorcheska (Switzerland) Jil Teichmann	(United Kingdom) Francesca Jones (Serbia) Olga Danilović	(Andorra) Victoria Jiménez Kasintseva; Kristina Dmitruk (Germany) Ella Seidel (Italy) Nuria Brancaccio
September 30	Hong Kong 125 Open; Hong Kong SAR, China; Hard – $115,000 – 32S/8Q/8D; Singles – Doubles	(Australia) Ajla Tomljanović; 4–6, 6–4, 6–4	(Denmark) Clara Tauson	Anna Blinkova (France) Varvara Gracheva	(United States) Emma Navarro (United States) McCartney Kessler (Netherlands) Suzan Lamens (Japan) Nao Hibino
September 30	Hong Kong 125 Open; Hong Kong SAR, China; Hard – $115,000 – 32S/8Q/8D; Singles – Doubles	(Romania) Monica Niculescu (Romania) Elena-Gabriela Ruse; 6–3, 5–7, [10–5]	(Japan) Nao Hibino (Japan) Makoto Ninomiya	Anna Blinkova (France) Varvara Gracheva	(United States) Emma Navarro (United States) McCartney Kessler (Netherlands) Suzan Lamens (Japan) Nao Hibino
October 21	Abierto Tampico; Tampico, Mexico; Hard – $115,000 – 32S/16Q/16D; Singles – Doubles	(Canada) Marina Stakusic; 6–4, 2–6, 6–4	Anna Blinkova	(Spain) Sara Sorribes Tormo (Canada) Rebecca Marino	(Italy) Lucrezia Stefanini (Germany) Tatjana Maria (Australia) Maya Joint (United States) Varvara Lepchenko
October 21	Abierto Tampico; Tampico, Mexico; Hard – $115,000 – 32S/16Q/16D; Singles – Doubles	(United States) Carmen Corley (Canada) Rebecca Marino; 6–3, 6–3	Alina Korneeva; Polina Kudermetova	(Spain) Sara Sorribes Tormo (Canada) Rebecca Marino	(Italy) Lucrezia Stefanini (Germany) Tatjana Maria (Australia) Maya Joint (United States) Varvara Lepchenko
October 28	Bolivia Open; Santa Cruz, Bolivia; Clay – $115,000 – 32S/8Q/8D; Singles – Doubles	(Romania) Anca Todoni; 7–6^{(7–5)}, 6–0	(Colombia) Emiliana Arango	(Hungary) Panna Udvardy (Latvia) Darja Semeņistaja	(Spain) Leyre Romero Gormaz (Croatia) Tara Würth (Argentina) Julia Riera (France) Chloé Paquet
October 28	Bolivia Open; Santa Cruz, Bolivia; Clay – $115,000 – 32S/8Q/8D; Singles – Doubles	(Italy) Nuria Brancaccio (Spain) Leyre Romero Gormaz; 6–4, 6–4	(Spain) Aliona Bolsova (Ukraine) Valeriya Strakhova	(Hungary) Panna Udvardy (Latvia) Darja Semeņistaja	(Spain) Leyre Romero Gormaz (Croatia) Tara Würth (Argentina) Julia Riera (France) Chloé Paquet
November 4	Dow Tennis Classic; Midland, United States; Hard (i) – $115,000 – 32S/16Q/15D; Singles – Doubles	(Canada) Rebecca Marino; 6–2, 6–1	(United States) Alycia Parks	(Ukraine) Lesia Tsurenko (United States) Lauren Davis	(United States) Karina Miller; Alina Korneeva (Australia) Astra Sharma (United States) Varvara Lepchenko
November 4	Dow Tennis Classic; Midland, United States; Hard (i) – $115,000 – 32S/16Q/15D; Singles – Doubles	(United Kingdom) Emily Appleton (United Kingdom) Maia Lumsden; 6–2, 4–6, [10–5]	(Canada) Ariana Arseneault (Canada) Mia Kupres	(Ukraine) Lesia Tsurenko (United States) Lauren Davis	(United States) Karina Miller; Alina Korneeva (Australia) Astra Sharma (United States) Varvara Lepchenko
November 4	Cali Open; Cali, Colombia; Clay – $115,000 – 32S/16Q/15D; Singles – Doubles	(Romania) Irina-Camelia Begu; 6–3, 6–3	(Slovenia) Veronika Erjavec	(Hungary) Panna Udvardy (Australia) Tina Nadine Smith	(Colombia) Camila Osorio (Argentina) Jazmín Ortenzi (Spain) Leyre Romero Gormaz (Romania) Anca Todoni
November 4	Cali Open; Cali, Colombia; Clay – $115,000 – 32S/16Q/15D; Singles – Doubles	(Slovenia) Veronika Erjavec (France) Kristina Mladenovic; 6–2, 7–6^{(7–4)}	(Croatia) Tara Würth (Ukraine) Katarina Zavatska	(Hungary) Panna Udvardy (Australia) Tina Nadine Smith	(Colombia) Camila Osorio (Argentina) Jazmín Ortenzi (Spain) Leyre Romero Gormaz (Romania) Anca Todoni
November 18	Fifth Third Charleston WTA 125; Charleston, United States; Clay – $115,000 – 32S/8Q/15D; Singles – Doubles	(Mexico) Renata Zarazúa; 6–1, 7–6^{(7–4)}	(United States) Hanna Chang	(United States) Lauren Davis (Italy) Nuria Brancaccio	(United States) Louisa Chirico (Romania) Gabriela Lee (United States) Varvara Lepchenko (Spain) Leyre Romero Gormaz
November 18	Fifth Third Charleston WTA 125; Charleston, United States; Clay – $115,000 – 32S/8Q/15D; Singles – Doubles	(Italy) Nuria Brancaccio (Spain) Leyre Romero Gormaz; 7–6^{(8–6)}, 6–2	(Canada) Kayla Cross (United States) Liv Hovde	(United States) Lauren Davis (Italy) Nuria Brancaccio	(United States) Louisa Chirico (Romania) Gabriela Lee (United States) Varvara Lepchenko (Spain) Leyre Romero Gormaz
November 18	LP Open by Ind; Colina, Chile; Clay – $115,000 – 32S/8Q/14D; Singles – Doubles	(Serbia) Nina Stojanović; 3–6, 6–4, 6–4	(Argentina) María Lourdes Carlé	(Czech Republic) Sára Bejlek (Egypt) Mayar Sherif	(Latvia) Darja Semeņistaja (Spain) Guiomar Maristany (Portugal) Francisca Jorge (Romania) Georgia Crăciun
November 18	LP Open by Ind; Colina, Chile; Clay – $115,000 – 32S/8Q/14D; Singles – Doubles	(Egypt) Mayar Sherif (Serbia) Nina Stojanović; Walkover	(France) Léolia Jeanjean (France) Kristina Mladenovic	(Czech Republic) Sára Bejlek (Egypt) Mayar Sherif	(Latvia) Darja Semeņistaja (Spain) Guiomar Maristany (Portugal) Francisca Jorge (Romania) Georgia Crăciun
November 25	IEB+ Argentina Open; Buenos Aires, Argentina; Clay – $115,000 – 32S/8Q/8D; Singles – Doubles	(Egypt) Mayar Sherif; 6–3, 4–6, 6–4	(Poland) Katarzyna Kawa	(Argentina) María Lourdes Carlé (Czech Republic) Sára Bejlek	(Latvia) Darja Semeņistaja (Argentina) Julia Riera (Argentina) Jazmín Ortenzi (France) Léolia Jeanjean
November 25	IEB+ Argentina Open; Buenos Aires, Argentina; Clay – $115,000 – 32S/8Q/8D; Singles – Doubles	(Poland) Maja Chwalińska (Poland) Katarzyna Kawa; 6–4, 3–6, [10–7]	(Brazil) Laura Pigossi (Egypt) Mayar Sherif	(Argentina) María Lourdes Carlé (Czech Republic) Sára Bejlek	(Latvia) Darja Semeņistaja (Argentina) Julia Riera (Argentina) Jazmín Ortenzi (France) Léolia Jeanjean
December 2	Open in Arte Angers Loire; Angers, France; Hard (i) – $115,000 – 32S/8Q/8D; Singles – Doubles	(United States) Alycia Parks; 7–6^{(7–4)}, 3–6, 6–0	(Switzerland) Belinda Bencic	(Germany) Mona Barthel (Czech Republic) Dominika Šalková	(Czech Republic) Barbora Palicová (Andorra) Victoria Jiménez Kasintseva (France) Océane Dodin (United States) Varvara Lepchenko
December 2	Open in Arte Angers Loire; Angers, France; Hard (i) – $115,000 – 32S/8Q/8D; Singles – Doubles	(Romania) Monica Niculescu (Romania) Elena-Gabriela Ruse; 6–3, 6–4	(Switzerland) Belinda Bencic (Switzerland) Céline Naef	(Germany) Mona Barthel (Czech Republic) Dominika Šalková	(Czech Republic) Barbora Palicová (Andorra) Victoria Jiménez Kasintseva (France) Océane Dodin (United States) Varvara Lepchenko
December 2	MundoTenis Open; Florianópolis, Brazil; Clay – $115,000 – 32S/8Q/16D; Singles – Doubles	(Poland) Maja Chwalińska; 6–1, 6–2	(Switzerland) Ylena In-Albon	(Argentina) María Lourdes Carlé (France) Léolia Jeanjean	(Poland) Katarzyna Kawa (Italy) Nicole Fossa Huergo (Ukraine) Valeriya Strakhova (Egypt) Mayar Sherif
December 2	MundoTenis Open; Florianópolis, Brazil; Clay – $115,000 – 32S/8Q/16D; Singles – Doubles	(Poland) Maja Chwalińska (Brazil) Laura Pigossi; 7–6^{(7–3)}, 6–3	(Italy) Nicole Fossa Huergo (Ukraine) Valeriya Strakhova	(Argentina) María Lourdes Carlé (France) Léolia Jeanjean	(Poland) Katarzyna Kawa (Italy) Nicole Fossa Huergo (Ukraine) Valeriya Strakhova (Egypt) Mayar Sherif
December 9	Open BLS de Limoges; Limoges, France; Hard (i) – $115,000 – 32S/8Q/8D; Singles – Doubles	(Switzerland) Viktorija Golubic; 7–5, 6–4	(Switzerland) Céline Naef	(France) Elsa Jacquemot (Spain) Nuria Párrizas Díaz	(France) Manon Léonard; Erika Andreeva (United States) Varvara Lepchenko (France) Carole Monnet
December 9	Open BLS de Limoges; Limoges, France; Hard (i) – $115,000 – 32S/8Q/8D; Singles – Doubles	(France) Elsa Jacquemot (France) Margaux Rouvroy; 6–4, 6–3	Erika Andreeva (France) Séléna Janicijevic	(France) Elsa Jacquemot (Spain) Nuria Párrizas Díaz	(France) Manon Léonard; Erika Andreeva (United States) Varvara Lepchenko (France) Carole Monnet

=== Cancelled tournaments ===
Original Week of	Tournament	Reason
January 22	Tiny's Ice-Cream Open; Da Nang, Vietnam; Hard – $115,000 – 32S/8Q/16D	Cancelled due to lack of sponsors
August 12	Golden Gate Open; Stanford, United States; Hard – $164,000 – 32S/16Q/16D	Cancelled due to plans to rebuild the tennis center
October 7	Chengdu Open WTA 125; Chengdu, China; Hard – $115,000 – 32S/16Q/16D	
October 14	Mazatlán Ladies Open; Mazatlán, Mexico; Hard – $115,000 – 32S/8Q/8D	
October 21	Sao Paulo Open; São Paulo, Brazil; Clay – $115,000 – 32S/16Q/16D	

== Statistical information ==
These tables present the number of singles (S) and doubles (D) titles won by each player and each nation during the season. The players/nations are sorted by: 1) total number of titles (a doubles title won by two players representing the same nation counts as only one win for the nation); 2) a singles > doubles hierarchy; 3) alphabetical order (by family names for players).

To avoid confusion and double counting, these tables should be updated only after an event is completed.

=== Titles won by player ===
Total	Player	S	D	S	D
4	Alycia Parks (USA)	● ● ●	●	3	1
3	Anna Bondár (HUN)	●	● ●	1	2
3	Maja Chwalińska (POL)	●	● ●	1	2
3	Darja Semeņistaja (LAT)	●	● ●	1	2
3	Nuria Brancaccio (ITA)		● ● ●	0	3
3	Leyre Romero Gormaz (ESP)		● ● ●	0	3
3	Iryna Shymanovich (Note: As of 1 March 2022, the ATP and WTA announced that players from Russia and Belarus will not compete in tournaments under the name or flag of Russia or Belarus due to the Russian invasion of Ukraine.)		● ● ●	0	3
2	Irina-Camelia Begu (ROU)	● ●		2	0
2	Nadia Podoroska (ARG)	● ●		2	0
2	Anca Todoni (ROU)	● ●		2	0
2	Rebecca Marino (CAN)	●	●	1	1
2	Mayar Sherif (EGY)	●	●	1	1
2	Nina Stojanović (SRB)	●	●	1	1
2	Renata Zarazúa (MEX)	●	●	1	1
2	Anna Danilina (KAZ)		● ●	0	2
2	Veronika Erjavec (SLO)		● ●	0	2
2	Irina Khromacheva		● ●	0	2
2	Monica Niculescu (ROU)		● ●	0	2
2	Katarzyna Piter (POL)		● ●	0	2
2	Elena-Gabriela Ruse (ROU)		● ●	0	2
2	Sabrina Santamaria (USA)		● ●	0	2
2	Fanny Stollár (HUN)		● ●	0	2
1	Loïs Boisson (FRA)	●		1	0
1	Jéssica Bouzas Maneiro (ESP)	●		1	0
1	Lucia Bronzetti (ITA)	●		1	0
1	Miriam Bulgaru (ROU)	●		1	0
1	María Lourdes Carlé (ARG)	●		1	0
1	Elisabetta Cocciaretto (ITA)	●		1	0
1	Viktorija Golubic (SUI)	●		1	0
1	McCartney Kessler (USA)	●		1	0
1	Suzan Lamens (NED)	●		1	0
1	Ann Li (USA)	●		1	0
1	Nuria Párrizas Díaz (ESP)	●		1	0
1	Kamilla Rakhimova	●		1	0
1	Anna Karolína Schmiedlová (SVK)	●		1	0
1	Diana Shnaider	●		1	0
1	Kateřina Siniaková (CZE)	●		1	0
1	Marina Stakusic (CAN)	●		1	0
1	Jil Teichmann (SUI)	●		1	0
1	Ajla Tomljanović (AUS)	●		1	0
1	Martina Trevisan (ITA)	●		1	0
1	Katie Volynets (USA)	●		1	0
1	Amina Anshba		●	0	1
1	Emily Appleton (GBR)		●	0	1
1	Hailey Baptiste (USA)		●	0	1
1	Carmen Corley (USA)		●	0	1
1	Anastasia Dețiuc (CZE)		●	0	1
1	Jessica Failla (USA)		●	0	1
1	Weronika Falkowska (POL)		●	0	1
1	Olivia Gadecki (AUS)		●	0	1
1	Quinn Gleason (USA)		●	0	1
1	Elsa Jacquemot (FRA)		●	0	1
1	Dalila Jakupović (SLO)		●	0	1
1	Francisca Jorge (POR)		●	0	1
1	Matilde Jorge (POR)		●	0	1
1	Oksana Kalashnikova (GEO)		●	0	1
1	Katarzyna Kawa (POL)		●	0	1
1	Miriam Kolodziejová (CZE)		●	0	1
1	Martyna Kubka (POL)		●	0	1
1	Hiroko Kuwata (JPN)		●	0	1
1	Maia Lumsden (GBR)		●	0	1
1	Ingrid Martins (BRA)		●	0	1
1	Nicole Melichar-Martinez (USA)		●	0	1
1	Kristina Mladenovic (FRA)		●	0	1
1	Carole Monnet (FRA)		●	0	1
1	Angelica Moratelli (ITA)		●	0	1
1	Asia Muhammad (USA)		●	0	1
1	Olivia Nicholls (GBR)		●	0	1
1	Ellen Perez (AUS)		●	0	1
1	Laura Pigossi (BRA)		●	0	1
1	Peangtarn Plipuech (THA)		●	0	1
1	Camilla Rosatello (ITA)		●	0	1
1	Margaux Rouvroy (FRA)		●	0	1
1	Anna Sisková (CZE)		●	0	1
1	Aldila Sutjiadi (INA)		●	0	1
1	Tsao Chia-yi (TPE)		●	0	1
1	Tamara Zidanšek (SLO)		●	0	1
1	Kimberley Zimmermann (BEL)		●	0	1

=== Titles won by nation ===
Total	Nation	S	D
14	United States (USA)	6	8
7	Romania (ROU)	5	2
7	Italy (ITA)	3	4
6	Poland (POL)	1	5
5	Spain (ESP)	2	3
5	Hungary (HUN)	1	4
4	France (FRA)	1	3
4	Slovenia (SLO)	0	4
3	Argentina (ARG)	3	0
3	Canada (CAN)	2	1
3	Australia (AUS)	1	2
3	Czech Republic (CZE)	1	2
3	Latvia (LAT)	1	2
2	Switzerland (SUI)	2	0
2	Egypt (EGY)	1	1
2	Mexico (MEX)	1	1
2	Serbia (SRB)	1	1
2	Brazil (BRA)	0	2
2	Great Britain (GBR)	0	2
2	Kazakhstan (KAZ)	0	2
1	Netherlands (NED)	1	0
1	Slovakia (SVK)	1	0
1	Belgium (BEL)	0	1
1	Chinese Taipei (TPE)	0	1
1	Georgia (GEO)	0	1
1	Indonesia (INA)	0	1
1	Japan (JPN)	0	1
1	Portugal (POR)	0	1
1	Thailand (THA)	0	1

== Points distribution ==
Event	W	F	SF	QF	R16	R32	Q	Q2	Q1
Singles	125	81	49	27	15	1	6	4	1
Doubles (16D)	125	81	49	27	1	—N/a	—N/a	—N/a	—N/a
Doubles (8D)	125	81	49	1	—N/a	—N/a	—N/a	—N/a	—N/a

== See also ==
- 2024 WTA Tour
- 2024 ITF Women's World Tennis Tour
- 2024 ATP Challenger Tour
