= 2024 Fifth Third Charleston 125 2 =

- Date: 18 – 24 November
- Edition: 3rd
- Category: WTA 125
- Draw: 32S / 16D
- Prize money: $115,000
- Surface: Outdoor clay
- Location: Charleston, South Carolina, United States
- Venue: LTP Mount Pleasant

Champions

Singles
- (Mexico) Renata Zarazúa

Doubles
- (Italy) Nuria Brancaccio / (Spain) Leyre Romero Gormaz
| ← 2024 · | LTP Charleston Pro Tennis | · 2025 → |

The 2024 Fifth Third Charleston 125 2, sponsored by the Fifth Third Bank, was a professional women's tennis tournament played on outdoor clay courts. It was the 3rd edition of the tournament and part of the 2024 WTA 125 tournaments, offering a total of $115,000 in prize money. The first edition in 2021 was held on green clay but the surface was changed to hard for the second edition staged in March 2024. It took place at LTP Mount Pleasant in Charleston, South Carolina, United States from 18 to 24 November 2024.

== Singles main-draw entrants ==
=== Seeds ===
| Country | Player | Rank^{1} | Seed |
|---|---|---|---|
| MEX | Renata Zarazúa | 60 | 1 |
| USA | Alycia Parks | 112 | 2 |
| USA | Varvara Lepchenko | 143 | 3 |
| HUN | Panna Udvardy | 159 | 4 |
| ESP | Leyre Romero Gormaz | 167 | 5 |
| USA | Louisa Chirico | 183 | 6 |
| USA | Hanna Chang | 197 | 7 |
| USA | Iva Jovic | 206 | 8 |

- ^{1} Rankings as of 11 November 2024.

=== Other entrants ===
The following players received a wildcard into the singles main draw:

- (United States) Usue Maitane Arconada
- (United States) Lauren Davis
- (United States) Iva Jovic
- (United States) Madison Sieg

The following players received entry into the singles main draw through qualification:

- (Romania) Miriam Bulgaru
- (Georgia (country)) Ekaterine Gorgodze
- (Romania) Gabriela Lee
- (United States) Alana Smith

The following player received entry as a lucky loser:

- (Canada) Kayla Cross

== Doubles entrants ==
=== Seeds ===
| Country | Player | Country | Player | Rank^{1} | Seed |
|---|---|---|---|---|---|
| GBR | Emily Appleton | USA | Carmen Corley | 215 | 1 |
| USA | Sophie Chang | USA | Rasheeda McAdoo | 314 | 2 |
| ITA | Nuria Brancaccio | ESP | Leyre Romero Gormaz | 356 | 3 |
| AUS | Jaimee Fourlis | USA | Dalayna Hewitt | 367 | 4 |

- ^{1} Rankings as of 11 November 2024.

=== Other entrants ===
The following pair received a wildcard into the doubles main draw:

- (United States) Frances Pate / (United States) Chelsea Sawyer

== Champions ==
=== Singles ===
- (Mexico) Renata Zarazúa def. (United States) Hanna Chang 6–1, 7–6^{(7–4)}

=== Doubles ===
- (Italy) Nuria Brancaccio / (Spain) Leyre Romero Gormaz def. (Canada) Kayla Cross / (United States) Liv Hovde, 7–6^{(8–6)}, 6–2
