= 2024 Bolivia Open =

- Date: 28 October–3 November
- Edition: 1st
- Category: WTA 125
- Draw: 32S / 8D
- Prize money: $115,000
- Surface: Clay
- Location: Santa Cruz de la Sierra, Bolivia
- Venue: Club de Tenis Santa Cruz

Champions

Singles
- (Romania) Anca Todoni

Doubles
- (Italy) Nuria Brancaccio / (Spain) Leyre Romero Gormaz
Bolivia Open	· 2025 →

The 2024 Bolivia Open was a professional tennis tournament played on outdoor clay courts. It was the first edition of the tournament and part of the 2024 WTA 125 tournaments. It took place in Santa Cruz de la Sierra, Bolivia, from 28 October to 3 November 2024.

== Champions ==
=== Singles ===
- (Romania) Anca Todoni def. (Colombia) Emiliana Arango 7–6^{(7–5)}, 6–0

=== Doubles ===
- (Italy) Nuria Brancaccio / (Spain) Leyre Romero Gormaz def. (Spain) Aliona Bolsova / (Ukraine) Valeriya Strakhova 6–4, 6–4

== Singles main draw entrants ==
=== Seeds ===
Country	Player	Rank¹	Seed
EGY	Mayar Sherif	93	1
FRA	Chloé Paquet	103	2
ARG	Julia Riera	113	3
BRA	Laura Pigossi	123	4
LAT	Darja Semeņistaja	125	5
ROU	Anca Todoni	133	6
HUN	Panna Udvardy	154	7
GBR	Francesca Jones	160	8

¹ Rankings are as of 21 October 2024.

=== Other entrants ===
The following players received wildcards into the singles main draw:

- (Chile) Fernanda Labraña
- (Argentina) Sol Ailin Larraya Guidi
- (Chile) Antonia Vergara Rivera
- (Bolivia) Noelia Zeballos

The following players received entry from the qualifying draw:

- (Brazil) Carolina Alves
- Daria Lodikova
- (Australia) Tina Nadine Smith
- (Bolivia) Natalia Trigosso

== Doubles main draw entrants ==
=== Seeds ===
Country	Player	Country	Player	Rank^{1}	Seed
SLO	Veronika Erjavec	LAT	Darja Semeņistaja	277	1
~~ARG~~	~~Julia Riera~~	~~EGY~~	~~Mayar Sherif~~	~~330~~	~~2~~
ESP	Aliona Bolsova	UKR	Valeriya Strakhova	397	3

¹ Rankings are as of 21 October 2024.

=== Other entrants ===
The following pair received a wildcard into the doubles main draw:

- (Canada) Carson Branstine / (Bolivia) Noelia Zeballos

The following pair received entry as alternates:

- (Argentina) Julieta Estable / (Argentina) Jazmín Ortenzi

=== Withdrawals ===
- (Argentina) Julia Riera / (Egypt) Mayar Sherif → replaced by (Argentina) Julieta Estable / (Argentina) Jazmín Ortenzi
