= 2024 Fifth Third Charleston 125 2 – Singles =

Singles
- 2024 Fifth Third Charleston 125 2

Final
- Champion: (Mexico) Renata Zarazúa
- Runner-up: (United States) Hanna Chang
- Score: 6–1, 7–6^{(7–4)}

Events
Singles	Doubles
- LTP Charleston Pro Tennis

Renata Zarazúa won the singles title at the 2024 Fifth Third Charleston 125 2, defeating Hanna Chang in the final, 6–1, 7–6^{(7–4)}.

Elisabetta Cocciaretto was the reigning champion from March 2024, but chose to participate in the Billie Jean King Cup finals.

== Seeds ==
1. (Mexico) Renata Zarazúa (champion)
2. (United States) Alycia Parks (second round)
3. (United States) Varvara Lepchenko (quarterfinals)
4. (Hungary) Panna Udvardy (first round)
5. (Spain) Leyre Romero Gormaz (quarterfinals)
6. (United States) Louisa Chirico (quarterfinals)
7. (United States) Hanna Chang (final)
8. (United States) Iva Jovic (second round)

== Draw ==
Key

- Q = Qualifier
- WC = Wild card
- LL = Lucky loser
- Alt = Alternate
- ITF = ITF entry
- PR = Protected ranking
- SR = Special ranking
- SE = Special exempt
- JE = Junior exempt
- JR = Junior Accelerator Programme entrant
- CO = College Accelerator Programme entrant
- NG = Next Gen Accelerator Program entrant
- w/o = Walkover
- r = Retired
- d = Defaulted

=== Finals ===
Semifinals
1	(Mexico) Renata Zarazúa	3	7^{7}	3
WC	(United States) Lauren Davis	6	6^{3}	0^{r}
7	(United States) Hanna Chang	7	0	6
(Italy) Nuria Brancaccio	5	6	4

Final
1	(Mexico) Renata Zarazúa	6	7^{7}
7	(United States) Hanna Chang	1	6^{4}

=== Top half ===
First round
1	(Mexico) R Zarazúa	6	7^{7}
A Charaeva	2	6^{5}
(Spain) I Burillo Escorihuela	6	7
Q	(Georgia (country)) E Gorgodze	1	5
Q	(Romania) M Bulgaru	6	3	2
(Cyprus) R Șerban	3	6	6
(Romania) I Bara	6	2	6^{3}
6	(United States) L Chirico	3	6	7^{7}
4	(Hungary) P Udvardy	1	4
WC	(United States) L Davis	6	6
(Australia) A Sharma	6	6
(Israel) L Glushko	3	0
Q	(Romania) G Lee	6	6
LL	(Canada) K Cross	2	1
WC	(United States) UM Arconada	4	4
8/WC	(United States) I Jovic	6	6

Second round
1	(Mexico) R Zarazúa	6	6
(Spain) I Burillo Escorihuela	2	1
(Cyprus) R Șerban	2	3
6	(United States) L Chirico	6	6
WC	(United States) L Davis	6	7^{7}
(Australia) A Sharma	3	6^{5}
Q	(Romania) G Lee	7^{7}	6
8/WC	(United States) I Jovic	6^{5}	2

Quarterfinals
1	(Mexico) R Zarazúa	6	6
6	(United States) L Chirico	2	4
WC	(United States) L Davis	4	7^{7}	6
Q	(Romania) G Lee	6	6^{2}	1

Semifinals
1	(Mexico) R Zarazúa	3	7^{7}	3
WC	(United States) L Davis	6	6^{3}	0^{r}

=== Bottom half ===
First round
7	(United States) H Chang	6	6
WC	(United States) M Sieg	4	3
(Canada) C Zhao	0	1
(United States) L Hovde	6	6
E Makarova	6	6
(Ukraine) K Zavatska	0	1
(United States) S Chang	3	5
3	(United States) V Lepchenko	6	7
5	(Spain) L Romero Gormaz	6	6
(Canada) S Fung	0	1
(Poland) G Feistel	5	6	6
Q	(United States) A Smith	7	2	1
(Austria) S Kraus	4	4
(Italy) N Brancaccio	6	6
(United States) V Hu	2	2
2	(United States) A Parks	6	6

Second round
7	(United States) H Chang	6	6
(United States) L Hovde	2	3
E Makarova	4	7	3
3	(United States) V Lepchenko	6	5	6
5	(Spain) L Romero Gormaz	6	6
(Poland) G Feistel	4	4
(Italy) N Brancaccio	6	6
2	(United States) A Parks	1	3

Quarterfinals
7	(United States) H Chang	6	2	7
3	(United States) V Lepchenko	4	6	5
5	(Spain) L Romero Gormaz	0	6^{4}
(Italy) N Brancaccio	6	7^{7}

Semifinals
7	(United States) H Chang	7	0	6
(Italy) N Brancaccio	5	6	4

== Qualifying ==
=== Seeds ===
1. (Romania) Miriam Bulgaru (qualified)
2. (Canada) Kayla Cross (qualifying competition, lucky loser)
3. (Romania) Gabriela Lee (qualified)
4. (Georgia (country)) Ekaterine Gorgodze (qualified)

=== Qualifiers ===
1. (Romania) Miriam Bulgaru
2. (United States) Alana Smith
3. (Romania) Gabriela Lee
4. (Georgia (country)) Ekaterine Gorgodze

=== Lucky loser ===
1. (Canada) Kayla Cross

=== Qualifying draw ===
==== First qualifier ====
Qualifying competition
1	(Romania) Miriam Bulgaru	3	6	6
WC	(United States) Ayana Akli	6	3	4

==== Second qualifier ====
Qualifying competition
2	(Canada) Kayla Cross	3	1
	(United States) Alana Smith	6	6

==== Third qualifier ====
Qualifying competition
3	(Romania) Gabriela Lee	6	6
	(United States) Jamie Loeb	2	3

==== Fourth qualifier ====
Qualifying competition
4	(Georgia (country)) Ekaterine Gorgodze	6	6
WC	(United States) Dalayna Hewitt	2	0
