= 2025 Australian Open – Women's singles qualifying =

Women's singles qualifying
- 2025 Australian Open

Events
| Singles | men | women | | boys | girls |
| Doubles | men | women | mixed | boys | girls |
| WC Singles | men | women | quad | boys | girls |
| WC Doubles | men | women | quad | boys | girls |

Qualification
| Singles | men | women |
- Australian Open

The 2025 Australian Open – Women's singles qualifying is a series of tennis matches that took place from 6 to 9 January 2025 to determine the sixteen qualifiers into the main draw of the women's singles tournament, and, if necessary, the lucky losers.

== Seeds ==
1. (United States) Alycia Parks (first round)
2. (Switzerland) Viktorija Golubic (qualified)
3. (United Kingdom) Harriet Dart (qualifying competition, lucky loser)
4. (Italy) Sara Errani (second round)
5. (Spain) Sara Sorribes Tormo (second round)
6. Polina Kudermetova (qualified)
7. (Slovakia) Anna Karolína Schmiedlová (second round)
8. Anastasia Zakharova (second round)
9. (Australia) Kimberly Birrell (qualified)
10. (Romania) Ana Bogdan (first round)
11. (United States) Robin Montgomery (second round)
12. (Romania) Anca Todoni (qualified)
13. (Latvia) Darja Semeņistaja (first round)
14. (China) Zhu Lin (first round)
15. (Romania) Elena-Gabriela Ruse (qualified)
16. (Croatia) Petra Martić (qualifying competition, lucky loser)
17. (Canada) Marina Stakusic (first round)
18. (Japan) Aoi Ito (first round)
19. (Argentina) Julia Riera (qualified)
20. (Poland) Maja Chwalińska (qualified)
21. (United States) Varvara Lepchenko (qualifying competition)
22. (Thailand) Mananchaya Sawangkaew (second round)
23. (Germany) Eva Lys (qualifying competition, lucky loser)
24. (France) Jessika Ponchet (first round)
25. (China) Wei Sijia (qualified)
26. (Switzerland) Jil Teichmann (qualifying competition)
27. (Croatia) Jana Fett (qualified)
28. (Japan) Ena Shibahara (first round)
29. Maria Timofeeva (second round)
30. (Ukraine) Daria Snigur (qualified)
31. (Germany) Ella Seidel (second round)
32. (Hungary) Dalma Gálfi (first round)

== Qualifiers ==
1. (Croatia) Jana Fett
2. (Switzerland) Viktorija Golubic
3. (Japan) Nao Hibino
4. (Poland) Maja Chwalińska
5. (Argentina) Julia Riera
6. Polina Kudermetova
7. (Ukraine) Daria Snigur
8. (Czech Republic) Sára Bejlek
9. (Australia) Kimberly Birrell
10. (Australia) Destanee Aiava
11. (China) Wei Sijia
12. (Romania) Anca Todoni
13. (Slovenia) Tamara Zidanšek
14. (France) Léolia Jeanjean
15. (Romania) Elena-Gabriela Ruse
16. (Slovenia) Veronika Erjavec

== Lucky losers ==
1. (Croatia) Petra Martić
2. (United Kingdom) Harriet Dart
3. (Germany) Eva Lys

== Draw ==
=== First qualifier ===
First round
1 | (United States) Alycia Parks | 2 | 3
PR | (Sweden) Mirjam Björklund | 6 | 6
(Argentina) Solana Sierra | 2 | 5
(Croatia) Lucija Ćirić Bagarić | 6 | 7
(Slovakia) Viktória Hrunčáková | 1 | 2
(Austria) Sinja Kraus | 6 | 6
(Philippines) Alexandra Eala | 5 | 2
27 | (Croatia) Jana Fett | 7 | 6

Second round
PR | (Sweden) Mirjam Björklund | 2 | 6 | 4
(Croatia) Lucija Ćirić Bagarić | 6 | 4 | 6
(Austria) Sinja Kraus | 0 | 6^{9}
27 | (Croatia) Jana Fett | 6 | 7^{11}

Qualifying competition
(Croatia) Lucija Ćirić Bagarić | 3 | 6^{6}
27 | (Croatia) Jana Fett | 6 | 7^{8}

=== Second qualifier ===
First round
2 | (Switzerland) Viktorija Golubic | 6 | 6
(Ukraine) Anastasiia Sobolieva | 3 | 3
(Brazil) Laura Pigossi | 6 | 6
(Spain) Guiomar Maristany | 3 | 1
(United States) Sachia Vickery | 7^{9} | 3 | 6
PR | (Croatia) Ana Konjuh | 6^{7} | 6 | 0
(Japan) Sayaka Ishii | 6 | 6
18 | (Japan) Aoi Ito | 3 | 4

Second round
2 | (Switzerland) Viktorija Golubic | 6 | 6
(Brazil) Laura Pigossi | 2 | 2
(United States) Sachia Vickery | 7^{7} | 6
(Japan) Sayaka Ishii | 6^{2} | 4

Qualifying competition
2 | (Switzerland) Viktorija Golubic | 6 | 6
(United States) Sachia Vickery | 2 | 4

=== Third qualifier ===
First round
3 | (United Kingdom) Harriet Dart | 6 | 7^{7}
WC | (Australia) Lizette Cabrera | 2 | 6^{5}
(Germany) Mona Barthel | 1 | 2
(Australia) Taylah Preston | 6 | 6
Ekaterina Makarova | 6 | 6
(Germany) Noma Noha Akugue | 2 | 3
(Japan) Nao Hibino | 7^{7} | 6
17 | (Canada) Marina Stakusic | 6^{5} | 1

Second round
3 | (United Kingdom) Harriet Dart | 6^{7} | 6 | 6
(Australia) Taylah Preston | 7^{9} | 1 | 2
Ekaterina Makarova | 3 | 7^{7} | 1
(Japan) Nao Hibino | 6 | 6^{4} | 6

Qualifying competition
3 | (United Kingdom) Harriet Dart | 4 | 5
(Japan) Nao Hibino | 6 | 7

=== Fourth qualifier ===
First round
4 | (Italy) Sara Errani | 2 | 6 | 6
PR | Alina Korneeva | 6 | 3 | 3
(Czech Republic) Brenda Fruhvirtová | 6 | 6
PR | (Belgium) Ysaline Bonaventure | 4 | 2
(United Kingdom) Lily Miyazaki | 7 | 4 | 6^{8}
(Belgium) Marie Benoît | 5 | 6 | 7^{10}
(Czech Republic) Dominika Šalková | 6^{3} | 7 | 6^{10}
20 | (Poland) Maja Chwalińska | 7^{7} | 5 | 7^{12}

Second round
4 | (Italy) Sara Errani | 0 | 2
(Czech Republic) Brenda Fruhvirtová | 6 | 6
(Belgium) Marie Benoît | 1 | 6 | 1
20 | (Poland) Maja Chwalińska | 6 | 3 | 6

Qualifying competition
(Czech Republic) Brenda Fruhvirtová | 3 | 4
20 | (Poland) Maja Chwalińska | 6 | 6

=== Fifth qualifier ===
First round
5 | (Spain) Sara Sorribes Tormo | 7^{7} | 5 | 6
WC | (Australia) Jaimee Fourlis | 6^{5} | 7 | 4
(France) Elsa Jacquemot | 3 | 2
(Australia) Maddison Inglis | 6 | 6
(Romania) Miriam Bulgaru | 6 | 6
(Italy) Giorgia Pedone | 2 | 3
(Croatia) Lea Bošković | 6 | 1 | 2
19 | (Argentina) Julia Riera | 4 | 6 | 6

Second round
5 | (Spain) Sara Sorribes Tormo | 6 | 3 | 3
(Australia) Maddison Inglis | 4 | 6 | 6
(Romania) Miriam Bulgaru | 4 | 4
19 | (Argentina) Julia Riera | 6 | 6

Qualifying competition
(Australia) Maddison Inglis | 6 | 1 | 2
19 | (Argentina) Julia Riera | 4 | 6 | 6

=== Sixth qualifier ===
First round
6 | Polina Kudermetova | 6 | 7
(Switzerland) Susan Bandecchi | 1 | 5
(France) Kristina Mladenovic | 6 | 6
(United States) Louisa Chirico | 2 | 4
Elena Pridankina | 3 | 6 | 5
WC | (Australia) Elena Micic | 6 | 3 | 7
PR | Darya Astakhova | 1 | 6 | 6
28 | (Japan) Ena Shibahara | 6 | 3 | 0

Second round
6 | Polina Kudermetova | 7 | 6
(France) Kristina Mladenovic | 5 | 4
WC | (Australia) Elena Micic | 6 | 3
PR | Darya Astakhova | 2 | 1^{r}

Qualifying competition
6 | Polina Kudermetova | 6 | 7
WC | (Australia) Elena Micic | 4 | 5

=== Seventh qualifier ===
First round
7 | (Slovakia) Anna Karolína Schmiedlová | 6 | 6
WC | (Australia) Tina Nadine Smith | 2 | 2
(Switzerland) Rebeka Masarova | 6^{6} | 6 | 6
(Spain) Irene Burillo Escorihuela | 7^{8} | 3 | 1
(Switzerland) Simona Waltert | 5 | 6^{5}
(Czech Republic) Barbora Palicová | 7 | 7^{7}
(Colombia) Emiliana Arango | 6 | 5 | 3
30 | (Ukraine) Daria Snigur | 3 | 7 | 6

Second round
7 | (Slovakia) Anna Karolína Schmiedlová | 4 | 5
(Switzerland) Rebeka Masarova | 6 | 7
(Czech Republic) Barbora Palicová | 3 | 0^{r}
30 | (Ukraine) Daria Snigur | 6 | 1

Qualifying competition
(Switzerland) Rebeka Masarova | 5 | 2
30 | (Ukraine) Daria Snigur | 7 | 6

=== Eighth qualifier ===
First round
8 | Anastasia Zakharova | 7^{8} | 6
(Japan) Kyōka Okamura | 6^{6} | 0
(Czech Republic) Sára Bejlek | 6 | 3 | 6
(Liechtenstein) Kathinka von Deichmann | 0 | 6 | 2
(Czech Republic) Linda Fruhvirtová | 5 | 4
(United Kingdom) Francesca Jones | 7 | 6
(China) Shi Han | 7 | 2 | 2
26 | (Switzerland) Jil Teichmann | 5 | 6 | 6

Second round
8 | Anastasia Zakharova | 4 | 4
(Czech Republic) Sára Bejlek | 6 | 6
(United Kingdom) Francesca Jones | 6 | 6^{13} | 3
26 | (Switzerland) Jil Teichmann | 4 | 7^{15} | 6

Qualifying competition
(Czech Republic) Sára Bejlek | 7 | 6
26 | (Switzerland) Jil Teichmann | 5 | 3

=== Ninth qualifier ===
First round
9 | (Australia) Kimberly Birrell | 7^{7} | 6
(Japan) Sara Saito | 6^{4} | 2
PR | (United States) Usue Maitane Arconada | 3 | 7^{7} | 4
(Australia) Priscilla Hon | 6 | 6^{5} | 6
(Japan) Mai Hontama | 6 | 3 | 4
WC | (Australia) Astra Sharma | 3 | 6 | 6
Oksana Selekhmeteva | 6 | 3 | 6
32 | (Hungary) Dalma Gálfi | 4 | 6 | 4

Second round
9 | (Australia) Kimberly Birrell | 6 | 3 | 6
(Australia) Priscilla Hon | 4 | 6 | 4
WC | (Australia) Astra Sharma | 3 | 6 | 4
Oksana Selekhmeteva | 6 | 2 | 6

Qualifying competition
9 | (Australia) Kimberly Birrell | 6 | 6^{4} | 6
Oksana Selekhmeteva | 3 | 7^{7} | 4

=== Tenth qualifier ===
First round
10 | (Romania) Ana Bogdan | 4 | 2
(Australia) Destanee Aiava | 6 | 6
(Hungary) Panna Udvardy | 6 | 6
WC | (Australia) Melisa Ercan | 0 | 3
Aliona Falei | 3 | 5
(Australia) Arina Rodionova | 6 | 7
(Belgium) Hanne Vandewinkel | 4 | 3
23 | (Germany) Eva Lys | 6 | 6

Second round
(Australia) Destanee Aiava | 6 | 6
(Hungary) Panna Udvardy | 4 | 1
(Australia) Arina Rodionova | 5 | 4
23 | (Germany) Eva Lys | 7 | 6

Qualifying competition
(Australia) Destanee Aiava | 6 | 2 | 6
23 | (Germany) Eva Lys | 1 | 6 | 4

=== Eleventh qualifier ===
First round
11 | (United States) Robin Montgomery | 6 | 6
PR | (Slovenia) Polona Hercog | 2 | 1
(Switzerland) Céline Naef | 4 | 3
PR | (Serbia) Nina Stojanović | 6 | 6
(Germany) Tamara Korpatsch | 6 | 3 | 6
(Italy) Nuria Brancaccio | 2 | 6 | 4
Aliaksandra Sasnovich | 5 | 6 | 3
25 | (China) Wei Sijia | 7 | 4 | 6

Second round
11 | (United States) Robin Montgomery | 4 | 7^{7} | 3
PR | (Serbia) Nina Stojanović | 6 | 6^{5} | 6
(Germany) Tamara Korpatsch | 3 | 3
25 | (China) Wei Sijia | 6 | 6

Qualifying competition
PR | (Serbia) Nina Stojanović | 6 | 4 | 6^{9}
25 | (China) Wei Sijia | 4 | 6 | 7^{11}

=== Twelfth qualifier ===
First round
12 | (Romania) Anca Todoni | 6 | 4 | 6
(Andorra) Victoria Jiménez Kasintseva | 1 | 6 | 4
(Italy) Lucrezia Stefanini | 3 | 6 | 4
(Spain) Leyre Romero Gormaz | 6 | 3 | 6
(United Kingdom) Heather Watson | 7 | 6^{14} | 6
(Serbia) Lola Radivojević | 5 | 7^{16} | 2
(United States) Hanna Chang | 1 | 3
21 | (United States) Varvara Lepchenko | 6 | 6

Second round
12 | (Romania) Anca Todoni | 6 | 6
(Spain) Leyre Romero Gormaz | 3 | 2
(United Kingdom) Heather Watson | 6 | 3 | 1
21 | (United States) Varvara Lepchenko | 3 | 6 | 6

Qualifying competition
12 | (Romania) Anca Todoni | 6 | 6
21 | (United States) Varvara Lepchenko | 3 | 2

=== Thirteenth qualifier ===
First round
13 | (Latvia) Darja Semeņistaja | 4 | 6 | 2
(France) Carole Monnet | 6 | 3 | 6
(France) Manon Léonard | 3 | 5
WC | (Slovakia) Renáta Jamrichová | 6 | 7
(Thailand) Lanlana Tararudee | 0 | 6 | 4
(Slovenia) Tamara Zidanšek | 6 | 4 | 6
(Cyprus) Raluca Șerban | 7^{7} | 6
24 | (France) Jessika Ponchet | 6^{5} | 0

Second round
(France) Carole Monnet | 7^{7} | 6
WC | (Slovakia) Renáta Jamrichová | 6^{2} | 1
(Slovenia) Tamara Zidanšek | 6 | 6
(Cyprus) Raluca Șerban | 2 | 2

Qualifying competition
(France) Carole Monnet | 3 | 7 | 3
(Slovenia) Tamara Zidanšek | 6 | 5 | 6

=== Fourteenth qualifier ===
First round
14 | (China) Zhu Lin | 3 | 6 | 2
(France) Séléna Janicijevic | 6 | 1 | 6
(Georgia (country)) Mariam Bolkvadze | 3 | 6 | 6
(Croatia) Antonia Ružić | 6 | 3 | 3
(Israel) Lina Glushko | 6 | 2 | 1
(France) Léolia Jeanjean | 1 | 6 | 6
PR | (United States) Claire Liu | 5 | 2
31 | (Germany) Ella Seidel | 7 | 6

Second round
(France) Séléna Janicijevic | 6 | 6
(Georgia (country)) Mariam Bolkvadze | 4 | 2
(France) Léolia Jeanjean | 5 | 6 | 6
31 | (Germany) Ella Seidel | 7 | 4 | 2

Qualifying competition
(France) Séléna Janicijevic | 3 | 6^{5}
(France) Léolia Jeanjean | 6 | 7^{7}

=== Fifteenth qualifier ===
First round
15 | (Romania) Elena-Gabriela Ruse | 6 | 6
(Switzerland) Leonie Küng | 1 | 1
PR | (Germany) Anna-Lena Friedsam | 6 | 6
PR | (Spain) Aliona Bolsova | 4 | 1
(Netherlands) Arianne Hartono | 2 | 6 | 1
(United States) Emina Bektas | 6 | 3 | 6
(France) Alice Tubello | 4 | 6 | 5
29 | Maria Timofeeva | 6 | 4 | 7

Second round
15 | (Romania) Elena-Gabriela Ruse | 3 | 6 | 6
PR | (Germany) Anna-Lena Friedsam | 6 | 3 | 4
(United States) Emina Bektas | 7^{7} | 3 | 7
29 | Maria Timofeeva | 6^{5} | 6 | 5

Qualifying competition
15 | (Romania) Elena-Gabriela Ruse | 6 | 7
(United States) Emina Bektas | 2 | 5

=== Sixteenth qualifier ===
First round
16 | (Croatia) Petra Martić | 6 | 7^{8}
WC | (Australia) Petra Hule | 2 | 6^{6}
(China) Gao Xinyu | 6 | 6
(Netherlands) Anouk Koevermans | 0 | 0
(Slovenia) Veronika Erjavec | 6 | 6
WC | (Australia) Alana Subasic | 2 | 3
(Spain) Marina Bassols Ribera | 1 | 5
22 | (Thailand) Mananchaya Sawangkaew | 6 | 7

Second round
16 | (Croatia) Petra Martić | 3 | 7^{7} | 6
(China) Gao Xinyu | 6 | 6^{5} | 4
(Slovenia) Veronika Erjavec | 6 | 6
22 | (Thailand) Mananchaya Sawangkaew | 2 | 3

Qualifying competition
16 | (Croatia) Petra Martić | 2 | 1
(Slovenia) Veronika Erjavec | 6 | 6
