= 2024 Bolivia Open – Singles =

Singles
- 2024 Bolivia Open

Final
- Champion: (Romania) Anca Todoni
- Runner-up: (Colombia) Emiliana Arango
- Score: 7–6^{(7–5)}, 6–0

Events
Singles	Doubles
Bolivia Open	· 2025 →

This was the first edition of the tournament.

Anca Todoni won the title, defeating Emiliana Arango in the final, 7–6^{(7–5)}, 6–0.

== Seeds ==
1. (Egypt) Mayar Sherif (first round, retired)
2. (France) Chloé Paquet (quarterfinals)
3. (Argentina) Julia Riera (quarterfinals)
4. (Brazil) Laura Pigossi (second round)
5. (Latvia) Darja Semeņistaja (semifinals)
6. (Romania) Anca Todoni (champion)
7. (Hungary) Panna Udvardy (semifinals)
8. (United Kingdom) Francesca Jones (second round, retired)

== Draw ==
=== Key ===
- Q = Qualifier
- WC = Wild card
- LL = Lucky loser
- Alt = Alternate
- ITF = ITF entry
- PR = Protected ranking
- SR = Special ranking
- SE = Special exempt
- JE = Junior exempt
- JR = Junior Accelerator Programme entrant
- CO = College Accelerator Programme entrant
- NG = Next Gen Accelerator Program entrant
- w/o = Walkover
- r = Retired
- d = Defaulted

=== Finals ===
Semifinals
(Colombia) Emiliana Arango	2	6	7^{7}
7	(Hungary) Panna Udvardy	6	2	6^{5}
5	(Latvia) Darja Semeņistaja	0	1
6	(Romania) Anca Todoni	6	6

Final
(Colombia) Emiliana Arango	6^{5}	0
6	(Romania) Anca Todoni	7^{7}	6

=== Top half ===
First round
1	(Egypt) M Sherif	1^{r}
(Colombia) E Arango	2
Q	(Bolivia) N Trigosso	3	4
WC	(Chile) A Vergara Rivera	6	6
(Italy) N Brancaccio	4	6	0^{r}
(Spain) L Romero Gormaz	6	3	5
(Argentina) M Capurro Taborda	1	2
8	(United Kingdom) F Jones	6	6
4	(Brazil) L Pigossi	6	6
Q	(Brazil) C Alves	3	1
Q	(Australia) TN Smith	2	3
(Croatia) T Würth	6	6
(Slovenia) V Erjavec	6	6
(Argentina) J Ortenzi	2	0
(Germany) N Noha Akugue	3	1
7	(Hungary) P Udvardy	6	6

Second round
(Colombia) E Arango	6	6
WC	(Chile) A Vergara Rivera	0	2
(Spain) L Romero Gormaz	3	6	5
8	(United Kingdom) F Jones	6	3	3^{r}
4	(Brazil) L Pigossi	4	6^{2}
(Croatia) T Würth	6	7^{7}
(Slovenia) V Erjavec	4	3
7	(Hungary) P Udvardy	6	6

Quarterfinals
(Colombia) E Arango	7	6
(Spain) L Romero Gormaz	5	1
(Croatia) T Würth	2	2
7	(Hungary) P Udvardy	6	6

Semifinals
(Colombia) E Arango	2	6	7^{7}
7	(Hungary) P Udvardy	6	2	6^{5}

=== Bottom half ===
First round
5	(Latvia) D Semeņistaja	6	6
(Spain) A Bolsova	3	4
(France) S Janicijevic	6	3	6
(France) K Mladenovic	1	6	3
Q	D Lodikova	7^{8}	6
(Ukraine) K Zavatska	6^{6}	1
(Argentina) J Estable	3	0
3	(Argentina) J Riera	6	6
6	(Romania) A Todoni	6	6
WC	(Argentina) SA Larraya Guidi	3	2
(Canada) C Branstine	6	6
(Netherlands) A Koevermans	3	4
(Ukraine) V Strakhova	7^{7}	6
WC	(Bolivia) N Zeballos	6^{5}	1
WC	(Chile) F Labraña	0	3
2	(France) C Paquet	6	6

Second round
5	(Latvia) D Semeņistaja	6	4	7
(France) S Janicijevic	2	6	5
Q	D Lodikova	3	1
3	(Argentina) J Riera	6	6
6	(Romania) A Todoni	6	3
(Canada) C Branstine	0	0^{r}
(Ukraine) V Strakhova	2	1
2	(France) C Paquet	6	6

Quarterfinals
5	(Latvia) D Semeņistaja	7	6
3	(Argentina) J Riera	5	3
6	(Romania) A Todoni	6	6
2	(France) C Paquet	3	0

Semifinals
5	(Latvia) D Semeņistaja	0	1
6	(Romania) A Todoni	6	6

== Qualifying ==
=== Seeds ===
1. (Brazil) Carolina Alves (qualified)
2. (Australia) Tina Smith (qualified)
3. Daria Lodikova (qualified)

=== Qualifiers ===
1. (Brazil) Carolina Alves
2. (Australia) Tina Smith
3. Daria Lodikova
4. (Bolivia) Natalia Trigosso

=== Qualifying draw ===
==== First qualifier ====
Qualifying competition
1	(Brazil) Carolina Alves	6	6
WC	(Bolivia) Milce Banzer	0	1

==== Second qualifier ====
Qualifying competition
2	(Australia) Tina Smith	6	6
WC	(Bolivia) Sara Montaño	1	0

==== Third qualifier ====
Qualifying competition
3	Daria Lodikova	6	6
WC	(Bolivia) Valery Sumoya	2	0

==== Fourth qualifier ====
Qualifying competition
WC	(Bolivia) Valentina Zamora	2	3
WC	(Bolivia) Natalia Trigosso	6	6
