= 2025 US Open – Women's singles qualifying =

Women's singles qualifying
- 2025 US Open

Details
- Draw: 128
- Seeds: 32

Events
Singles	men	women		boys	girls
Doubles	men	women	mixed	boys	girls
WC Singles	men	women	quad	boys	girls
WC Doubles	men	women	quad	boys	girls

Qualification
Singles	men	women
- US Open

The 2025 US Open – Women's singles qualifying was a series of tennis matches that took place from 18 to 22 August 2025 (was originally to end on 21 August, but got rescheduled due to heavy rain) to determine the sixteen qualifiers into the main draw of the women's singles tournament.

Sada Nahimana was the first Burundian player to compete in the qualifying competition of a major, and the first black African player from Africa in history to do so.

Janice Tjen was the first Indonesian to compete in the main draw of a singles major, following her qualification, since Angelique Widjaja at the 2004 US Open.

Only 16 out of the 128 qualifiers who competed in this tournament secured a main draw place, and, if necessary, the lucky losers.

== Seeds ==
All seeds are per WTA rankings as of 11 August 2025.

1. (United Kingdom) Francesca Jones (qualified)
2. (Czech Republic) Tereza Valentová (qualified)
3. (Japan) Aoi Ito (qualifying competition)
4. (Hungary) Dalma Gálfi (qualified)
5. (Bulgaria) Viktoriya Tomova (second round)
6. (France) Varvara Gracheva (qualifying competition)
7. (United States) Katie Volynets (qualified)
8. (Czech Republic) Sára Bejlek (first round)
9. (China) Zhang Shuai (qualified)
10. (United States) Bernarda Pera (first round)
11. (Croatia) Petra Marčinko (second round)
12. (Latvia) Darja Semeņistaja (qualified)
13. (Romania) Anca Todoni (first round)
14. (Austria) Julia Grabher (first round)
15. (Argentina) María Lourdes Carlé (first round)
16. (Poland) Katarzyna Kawa (first round)
17. (Canada) Rebecca Marino (qualified)
18. (Netherlands) Arantxa Rus (qualifying competition)
19. (Australia) Olivia Gadecki (second round)
20. (Japan) Ena Shibahara (qualified)
21. (Germany) Ella Seidel (qualifying competition)
22. (United States) Varvara Lepchenko (first round)
23. (Spain) Leyre Romero Gormaz (second round)
24. (Switzerland) Simona Waltert (second round)
25. (France) Jessika Ponchet (second round)
26. (Austria) Sinja Kraus (first round)
27. (Australia) Priscilla Hon (qualified)
28. (Andorra) Victoria Jiménez Kasintseva (qualified)
29. (Hungary) Panna Udvardy (qualifying competition)
30. (Chinese Taipei) Joanna Garland (first round)
31. (China) Wang Xiyu (qualified)
32. (Slovenia) Veronika Erjavec (qualifying competition)

== Qualifiers ==
1. (United Kingdom) Francesca Jones
2. (Czech Republic) Tereza Valentová
3. (Indonesia) Janice Tjen
4. (Hungary) Dalma Gálfi
5. (Australia) Priscilla Hon
6. (Japan) Ena Shibahara
7. (United States) Katie Volynets
8. (Australia) Destanee Aiava
9. (China) Zhang Shuai
10. (Andorra) Victoria Jiménez Kasintseva
11. (China) Wang Xiyu
12. (Latvia) Darja Semeņistaja
13. Oksana Selekhmeteva
14. (Canada) Rebecca Marino
15. (United States) Hina Inoue
16. (United States) Claire Liu

== Draw ==
Key

- Q = Qualifier
- WC = Wild card
- LL = Lucky loser
- Alt = Alternate
- ITF = ITF entry
- PR = Protected ranking
- SR = Special ranking
- SE = Special exempt
- JE = Junior exempt
- JR = Junior Accelerator Programme entrant
- CO = College Accelerator Programme entrant
- NG = Next Gen Accelerator Program entrant
- w/o = Walkover
- r = Retired
- d = Defaulted

=== First qualifier ===
First round
1	(United Kingdom) Francesca Jones	6	6
(Slovakia) Viktória Hrunčáková	3	4
(United Kingdom) Heather Watson	6	3	4
(Georgia (country)) Ekaterine Gorgodze	3	6	6
(Mexico) Ana Sofía Sánchez	6	4	3
(Netherlands) Arianne Hartono	2	6	6
(Netherlands) Anouk Koevermans	6	3	1
19	(Australia) Olivia Gadecki	3	6	6

Second round
1	(United Kingdom) Francesca Jones	6	7^{13}
(Georgia (country)) Ekaterine Gorgodze	1	6^{11}
(Netherlands) Arianne Hartono	6	4	6
19	(Australia) Olivia Gadecki	4	6	4

Qualifying competition
1	(United Kingdom) Francesca Jones	6	6
(Netherlands) Arianne Hartono	2	4

=== Second qualifier ===
First round
2	(Czech Republic) Tereza Valentová	6	6
(Germany) Mona Barthel	2	4
Tatiana Prozorova	6	6
PR	(Italy) Martina Trevisan	3	3
(United Kingdom) Jodie Burrage	6	6
(Romania) Patricia Maria Țig	4	0
(Spain) Carlota Martínez Círez	4	2
18	(Netherlands) Arantxa Rus	6	6

Second round
2	(Czech Republic) Tereza Valentová	7	6
Tatiana Prozorova	5	1
(United Kingdom) Jodie Burrage	7^{7}	4	4
18	(Netherlands) Arantxa Rus	6^{4}	6	6

Qualifying competition
2	(Czech Republic) Tereza Valentová	6	6
18	(Netherlands) Arantxa Rus	2	2

=== Third qualifier ===
First round
3	(Japan) Aoi Ito	6	5	6
(Germany) Anna-Lena Friedsam	4	7	3
(Spain) Guiomar Maristany	6	7^{7}
(France) Tiantsoa Rakotomanga Rajaonah	2	6^{4}
(Italy) Giorgia Pedone	2	0
(Poland) Maja Chwalińska	6	6
(Indonesia) Janice Tjen	6	6
22	(United States) Varvara Lepchenko	3	1

Second round
3	(Japan) Aoi Ito	6	1	6
(Spain) Guiomar Maristany	0	6	1
(Poland) Maja Chwalińska	5	5
(Indonesia) Janice Tjen	7	7

Qualifying competition
3	(Japan) Aoi Ito	1	2
(Indonesia) Janice Tjen	6	6

=== Fourth qualifier ===
First round
4	(Hungary) Dalma Gálfi	6	6
WC	(United States) Akasha Urhobo	2	4
WC	(United States) Fiona Crawley	6	6
(United States) Louisa Chirico	2	3
(Burundi) Sada Nahimana	3	4
(France) Manon Léonard	6	6
PR	(Argentina) Paula Ormaechea	4	1
29	(Hungary) Panna Udvardy	6	6

Second round
4	(Hungary) Dalma Gálfi	6	6
WC	(United States) Fiona Crawley	2	2
(France) Manon Léonard	2	1
29	(Hungary) Panna Udvardy	6	6

Qualifying competition
4	(Hungary) Dalma Gálfi	6	6
29	(Hungary) Panna Udvardy	3	4

=== Fifth qualifier ===
First round
5	(Bulgaria) Viktoriya Tomova	6	6
(Spain) Irene Burillo	3	0
(Canada) Marina Stakusic	3	2
(Belgium) Hanne Vandewinkel	6	6
(Germany) Jule Niemeier	6	6
(Australia) Daria Saville	0	2
(Italy) Nuria Brancaccio	5	4
27	(Australia) Priscilla Hon	7	6

Second round
5	(Bulgaria) Viktoriya Tomova	6	5	4
(Belgium) Hanne Vandewinkel	3	7	6
(Germany) Jule Niemeier	4	3
27	(Australia) Priscilla Hon	6	6

Qualifying competition
(Belgium) Hanne Vandewinkel	3	3
27	(Australia) Priscilla Hon	6	6

=== Sixth qualifier ===
First round
6	(France) Varvara Gracheva	7	6
PR	(United States) Madison Brengle	5	3
(Croatia) Tara Würth	6	7
(Australia) Arina Rodionova	1	5
(Czech Republic) Barbora Palicová	7	3	4
Elena Pridankina	5	6	6
PR	(United States) Kayla Day	5	1
20	(Japan) Ena Shibahara	7	6

Second round
6	(France) Varvara Gracheva	7	6
(Croatia) Tara Würth	5	2
Elena Pridankina	6^{5}	6^{7}
20	(Japan) Ena Shibahara	7^{7}	7^{9}

Qualifying competition
6	(France) Varvara Gracheva	0	4
20	(Japan) Ena Shibahara	6	6

=== Seventh qualifier ===
First round
7	(United States) Katie Volynets	6	6
(Belgium) Sofia Costoulas	3	4
WC	(United States) Amelia Honer	6	6
(United States) Whitney Osuigwe	2	3
PR	(Slovenia) Polona Hercog	7	2	4
(France) Tessah Andrianjafitrimo	5	6	6
(Croatia) Jana Fett	6	6
30	(Chinese Taipei) Joanna Garland	2	4

Second round
7	(United States) Katie Volynets	6	6^{4}	1
WC	(United States) Amelia Honer	2	7^{7}	0^{r}
(France) Tessah Andrianjafitrimo	7^{7}	5	4
(Croatia) Jana Fett	6^{5}	7	6

Qualifying competition
7	(United States) Katie Volynets	5	6	6
(Croatia) Jana Fett	7	2	3

=== Eighth qualifier ===
First round
8	(Czech Republic) Sára Bejlek	4	6	4
(Australia) Destanee Aiava	6	4	6
(Lithuania) Justina Mikulskytė	6	7
(Japan) Kyōka Okamura	3	5
PR	(United States) Sachia Vickery	7	7
(Ukraine) Anastasiia Sobolieva	5	5
(Liechtenstein) Kathinka von Deichmann	3	2
21	(Germany) Ella Seidel	6	6

Second round
(Australia) Destanee Aiava	2	6	6
(Lithuania) Justina Mikulskytė	6	1	4
PR	(United States) Sachia Vickery	1	2
21	(Germany) Ella Seidel	6	6

Qualifying competition
(Australia) Destanee Aiava	5	6	7^{10}
21	(Germany) Ella Seidel	7	1	6^{6}

=== Ninth qualifier ===
First round
9	(China) Zhang Shuai	7	6
WC	(United States) Mary Stoiana	5	3
(Czech Republic) Darja Vidmanová	6	6
WC	(United States) Maya Iyengar	1	2
PR	(Turkey) Berfu Cengiz	2	2
(China) Wei Sijia	6	6
(Switzerland) Céline Naef	4	4
23	(Spain) Leyre Romero Gormaz	6	6

Second round
9	(China) Zhang Shuai	6	6
(Czech Republic) Darja Vidmanová	4	0
(China) Wei Sijia	4	6	6
23	(Spain) Leyre Romero Gormaz	6	1	1

Qualifying competition
9	(China) Zhang Shuai	6	6
(China) Wei Sijia	1	3

=== Tenth qualifier ===
First round
10	(United States) Bernarda Pera	1	6	2
(Australia) Emerson Jones	6	4	6
(Brazil) Laura Pigossi	5	7^{7}	6
(Slovenia) Tamara Zidanšek	7	6^{2}	3
(Australia) Astra Sharma	7	6
(Serbia) Lola Radivojević	5	4
WC	(United States) Alexis Nguyen	2	5
28	(Andorra) Victoria Jiménez Kasintseva	6	7

Second round
(Australia) Emerson Jones	6	6
(Brazil) Laura Pigossi	4	4
(Australia) Astra Sharma	6	3	3
28	(Andorra) Victoria Jiménez Kasintseva	2	6	6

Qualifying competition
(Australia) Emerson Jones	5	6^{7}
28	(Andorra) Victoria Jiménez Kasintseva	7	7^{9}

=== Eleventh qualifier ===
First round
11	(Croatia) Petra Marčinko	6	6
(China) Gao Xinyu	2	1
WC	(United States) Monika Ekstrand	3	4
Alina Charaeva	6	6
(Czech Republic) Linda Fruhvirtová	3	0
(Croatia) Petra Martić	6	6
(Canada) Carson Branstine	6	3	3
31	(China) Wang Xiyu	3	6	6

Second round
11	(Croatia) Petra Marčinko	6	1	5
Alina Charaeva	1	6	7
(Croatia) Petra Martić	5	4
31	(China) Wang Xiyu	7	6

Qualifying competition
Alina Charaeva	4	6	2
31	(China) Wang Xiyu	6	4	6

=== Twelfth qualifier ===
First round
12	(Latvia) Darja Semeņistaja	2	6	7
(Spain) Andrea Lázaro García	6	2	5
(Ukraine) Oleksandra Oliynykova	2	4
(Australia) Lizette Cabrera	6	6
Alina Korneeva	6^{4}	7^{7}	4
(Poland) Linda Klimovičová	7^{7}	6^{2}	6
(United States) Elizabeth Mandlik	4	2
25	(France) Jessika Ponchet	6	6

Second round
12	(Latvia) Darja Semeņistaja	6	6
(Australia) Lizette Cabrera	1	2
(Poland) Linda Klimovičová	6	6
25	(France) Jessika Ponchet	3	3

Qualifying competition
12	(Latvia) Darja Semeņistaja	6	7^{7}
(Poland) Linda Klimovičová	3	6^{0}

=== Thirteenth qualifier ===
First round
13	(Romania) Anca Todoni	5	7^{7}	6^{6}
(United Kingdom) Harriet Dart	7	6^{3}	7^{10}
(Netherlands) Eva Vedder	5	2
WC	(United States) Ayana Akli	7	6
Oksana Selekhmeteva	2	6	6
(Argentina) Julia Riera	6	0	3
Iryna Shymanovich	6	2	7
26	(Austria) Sinja Kraus	3	6	5

Second round
(United Kingdom) Harriet Dart	6^{4}	1
WC	(United States) Ayana Akli	7^{7}	6
Oksana Selekhmeteva	6	6
Iryna Shymanovich	2	3

Qualifying competition
WC	(United States) Ayana Akli	5	6	2
Oksana Selekhmeteva	7	2	6

=== Fourteenth qualifier ===
First round
14	(Austria) Julia Grabher	5	6	2
(Czech Republic) Dominika Šalková	7	3	6
Kristina Dmitruk	7	6
(Slovenia) Kaja Juvan	5	4
WC	(United States) Kristina Penickova	0	6	6^{4}
(Japan) Mai Hontama	6	4	7^{10}
(Thailand) Lanlana Tararudee	3	6	5
17	(Canada) Rebecca Marino	6	2	7

Second round
(Czech Republic) Dominika Šalková	6	5	7^{10}
Kristina Dmitruk	3	7	6^{8}
(Japan) Mai Hontama	1	6	1
17	(Canada) Rebecca Marino	6	2	6

Qualifying competition
(Czech Republic) Dominika Šalková	3	6	1
17	(Canada) Rebecca Marino	6	2	6

=== Fifteenth qualifier ===
First round
15	(Argentina) María Lourdes Carlé	6^{8}	2
(Canada) Carol Zhao	7^{10}	6
PR	Vitalia Diatchenko	6^{6}	2
(Italy) Lucrezia Stefanini	7^{8}	6
(United States) Lauren Davis	1	2
(United States) Hina Inoue	6	6
(Ukraine) Daria Snigur	6	1	2
24	(Switzerland) Simona Waltert	4	6	6

Second round
(Canada) Carol Zhao	1	4
(Italy) Lucrezia Stefanini	6	6
(United States) Hina Inoue	6	6
24	(Switzerland) Simona Waltert	3	2

Qualifying competition
(Italy) Lucrezia Stefanini	6^{4}	1
(United States) Hina Inoue	7^{7}	6

=== Sixteenth qualifier ===
First round
16	(Poland) Katarzyna Kawa	1	3
PR	(United States) Claire Liu	6	6
PR	(Australia) Storm Hunter	3	4
(Australia) Maddison Inglis	6	6
(Canada) Cadence Brace	2	6	6
(Japan) Nao Hibino	6	3	3
Maria Timofeeva	3	1
32	(Slovenia) Veronika Erjavec	6	6

Second round
PR	(United States) Claire Liu	6	7
(Australia) Maddison Inglis	3	5
(Canada) Cadence Brace	4	4
32	(Slovenia) Veronika Erjavec	6	6

Qualifying competition
PR	(United States) Claire Liu	7	6
32	(Slovenia) Veronika Erjavec	5	4
