= Bolivia Open =

WTA 125K series
- Location: Santa Cruz de la Sierra, Bolivia
- Venue: Club de Tenis Santa Cruz
- Category: WTA 125
- Surface: Clay
- Draw: 32S / 8Q / 8D
- Prize money: US$115,000 (2024)

Current champions (2024)
- Singles: (Romania) Anca Todoni
- Doubles: (Italy) Nuria Brancaccio (Spain) Leyre Romero Gormaz

The Bolivia Open was a tennis tournament held in Santa Cruz de la Sierra, Bolivia in 2024. The event was part of the WTA 125 tournaments and was played on outdoor clay courts.

== Past finals ==
=== Singles ===
Year	Champion	Runner-up	Score
2024	(Romania) Anca Todoni	(Colombia) Emiliana Arango	7–6^{(7–5)}, 6–0

=== Doubles ===
Year	Champions	Runners-up	Score
2024	(Italy) Nuria Brancaccio (Spain) Leyre Romero Gormaz	(Spain) Aliona Bolsova (Ukraine) Valeriya Strakhova	6–4, 6–4
