= 2024 Bolivia Open – Doubles =

Doubles
- 2024 Bolivia Open

Final
- Champions: (Italy) Nuria Brancaccio (Spain) Leyre Romero Gormaz
- Runners-up: (Spain) Aliona Bolsova (Ukraine) Valeriya Strakhova
- Score: 6–4, 6–4

Events
| Singles | Doubles |
| Bolivia Open | · 2025 → |

This was the first edition of the tournament.

Nuria Brancaccio and Leyre Romero Gormaz won the title, defeating Aliona Bolsova and Valeriya Strakhova in the final, 6–4, 6–4.

== Seeds ==
1. (Slovenia) Veronika Erjavec / (Latvia) Darja Semeņistaja (quarterfinals)
2. (Argentina) Julia Riera / (Egypt) Mayar Sherif (withdrew)
3. (Spain) Aliona Bolsova / (Ukraine) Valeriya Strakhova (final)

== Draw ==
=== Key ===
- Q = Qualifier
- WC = Wild card
- LL = Lucky loser
- Alt = Alternate
- SE = Special exempt
- PR = Protected ranking
- ITF = ITF entry
- JE = Junior exempt
- w/o = Walkover
- r = Retired
- d = Defaulted
- SR = Special ranking

=== Draw ===
Quarterfinals
1 | (Slovenia) V Erjavec (Latvia) D Semeņistaja | 4 | 6^{4}
(Romania) A Todoni (Croatia) T Würth | 6 | 7^{7}
(Colombia) E Arango (Brazil) L Pigossi | 4 | 7^{7} | [8]
(Italy) N Brancaccio (Spain) L Romero Gormaz | 6 | 6^{5} | [10]
(France) S Janicijevic (Ukraine) K Zavatska | w/o
WC | (Canada) C Branstine (Bolivia) N Zeballos
Alt | (Argentina) J Estable (Argentina) J Ortenzi | 7 | 3 | [6]
3 | (Spain) A Bolsova (Ukraine) V Strakhova | 5 | 6 | [10]

Semifinals
(Romania) A Todoni (Croatia) T Würth | 4 | 7^{8} | [3]
(Italy) N Brancaccio (Spain) L Romero Gormaz | 6 | 6^{6} | [10]
(France) S Janicijevic (Ukraine) K Zavatska | 2 | 3
3 | (Spain) A Bolsova (Ukraine) V Strakhova | 6 | 6

Final
(Italy) N Brancaccio (Spain) L Romero Gormaz | 6 | 6
3 | (Spain) A Bolsova (Ukraine) V Strakhova | 4 | 4
