= 2024 Fifth Third Charleston 125 2 – Doubles =

Doubles
- 2024 Fifth Third Charleston 125 2

Final
- Champions: (Italy) Nuria Brancaccio (Spain) Leyre Romero Gormaz
- Runners-up: (Canada) Kayla Cross (United States) Liv Hovde
- Score: 7–6^{(8–6)}, 6–2

Events
| Singles | Doubles |
| ← 2024 · | LTP Charleston Pro Tennis | · 2025 → |

Nuria Brancaccio and Leyre Romero Gormaz won the doubles title at the 2024 Fifth Third Charleston 125 2, defeating Kayla Cross and Liv Hovde in the final, 7–6^{(8–6)}, 6–2.

Olivia Gadecki and Olivia Nicholls were the reigning champions from March 2024, but both players chose to participate in the Billie Jean King Cup finals.

== Seeds ==
1. (United Kingdom) Emily Appleton / (United States) Carmen Corley (quarterfinals)
2. (United States) Sophie Chang / (United States) Rasheeda McAdoo (quarterfinals)
3. (Italy) Nuria Brancaccio / (Spain) Leyre Romero Gormaz (champions)
4. (Australia) Jaimee Fourlis / (United States) Dalayna Hewitt (semifinals)

== Draw ==
=== Key ===
- Q = Qualifier
- WC = Wild card
- LL = Lucky loser
- Alt = Alternate
- SE = Special exempt
- PR = Protected ranking
- ITF = ITF entry
- JE = Junior exempt
- w/o = Walkover
- r = Retired
- d = Defaulted
- SR = Special ranking

=== Draw ===
First round
(Canada) K Cross (United States) L Hovde | w/o
(United States) UM Arconada (United States) M Mateas
4 | (Australia) J Fourlis (United States) D Hewitt | 6 | 1 | [10]
(United States) A Akli (United States) V Hu | 4 | 6 | [4]
(Georgia (country)) E Gorgodze; E Makarova | 3 | 6 | [5]
(Czech Republic) M Bayerlová (Slovakia) M Okáľová | 6 | 3 | [10]
(Greece) E Christofi (United States) C Rosca | 4 | 6 | [10]
(United States) H Chang (United States) J Loeb | 6 | 4 | [8]
A Charaeva (Australia) A Osborne | 6 | 6^{1} | [8]
3 | (Italy) N Brancaccio (Spain) L Romero Gormaz | 3 | 7^{7} | [10]
(Australia) K McPhee (Australia) A Sharma | w/o
WC | (United States) F Pate (United States) C Sawyer
(Romania) I Bara (Poland) G Feistel | 5 | 6^{5}
2 | (United States) S Chang (United States) R McAdoo | 7 | 7^{7}

Quarterfinals
1 | (United Kingdom) E Appleton (United States) C Corley | 3 | 5
(Canada) K Cross (United States) L Hovde | 6 | 7
4 | (Australia) J Fourlis (United States) D Hewitt | 6 | 6
(Czech Republic) M Bayerlová (Slovakia) M Okáľová | 2 | 3
(Greece) E Christofi (United States) C Rosca | 2 | 3
3 | (Italy) N Brancaccio (Spain) L Romero Gormaz | 6 | 6
(Australia) K McPhee (Australia) A Sharma | 0 | 6 | [11]
2 | (United States) S Chang (United States) R McAdoo | 6 | 1 | [9]

Semifinals
(Canada) K Cross (United States) L Hovde | 0 | 7^{7} | [10]
4 | (Australia) J Fourlis (United States) D Hewitt | 6 | 6^{4} | [6]
3 | (Italy) N Brancaccio (Spain) L Romero Gormaz | 7^{10} | 6
(Australia) K McPhee (Australia) A Sharma | 6^{8} | 3

Final
(Canada) K Cross (United States) L Hovde | 6^{6} | 2
3 | (Italy) N Brancaccio (Spain) L Romero Gormaz | 7^{8} | 6
