= Liv Hovde =

American tennis player (born 2005)

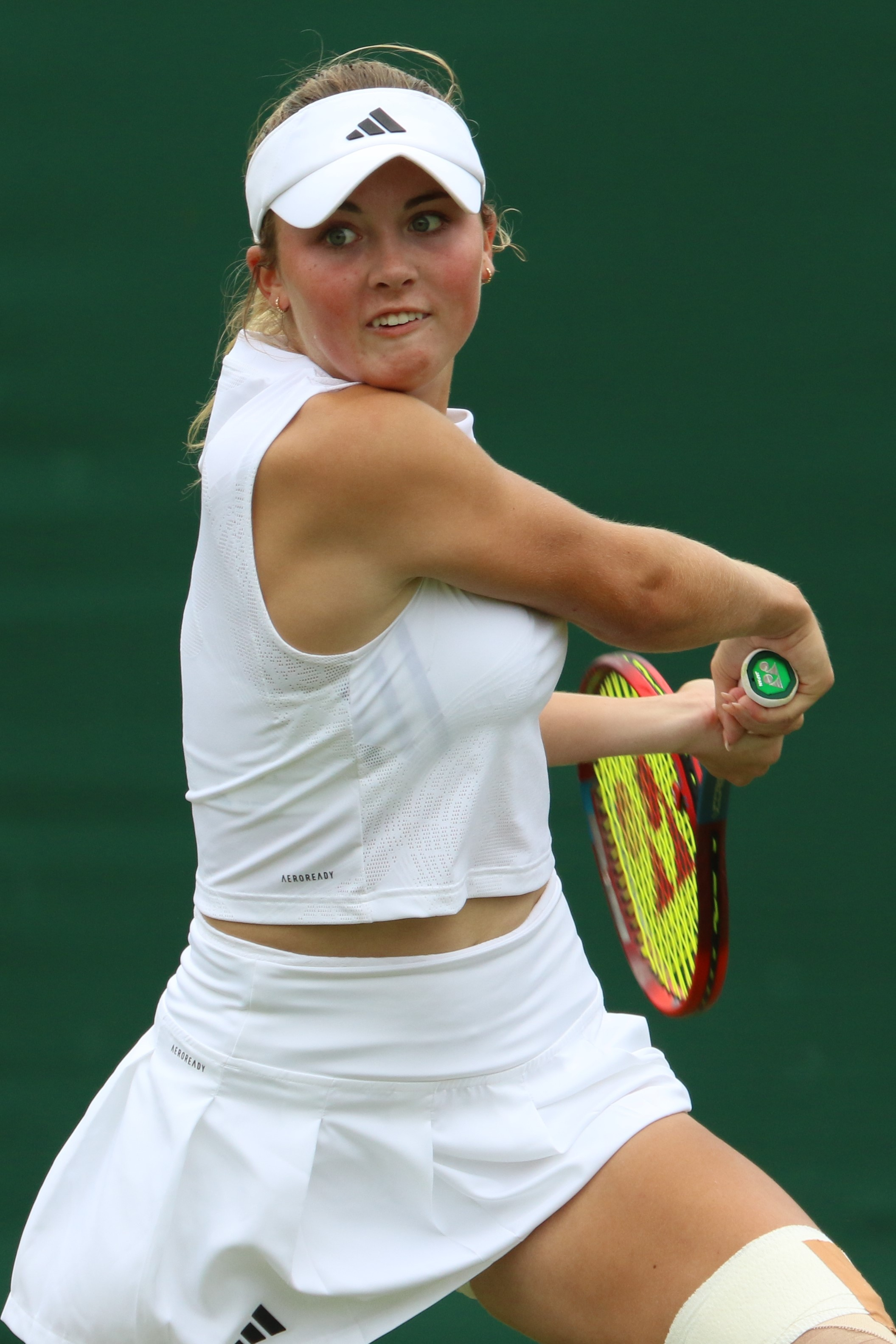
- Hovde in Wimbledon, 2023
- Country (sports): United States
- Born: October 25, 2005 (age 19) North Oaks, Minnesota, U.S.
- Plays: Right (two-handed backhand)
- Coach: Tom Downs
- Prize money: US$ 185,837

Singles
- Career record: 74–49
- Career titles: 4 ITF
- Highest ranking: No. 245 (21 October 2024)
- Current ranking: No. 245 (October 21, 2024)

Grand Slam singles results
- Wimbledon: Q1 (2023)
- US Open: Q1 (2022, 2023, 2024)

Doubles
- Career record: 20–9
- Career titles: 3 ITF
- Highest ranking: No. 354 (September 16, 2024)
- Current ranking: No. 483 (November 25, 2024)
- Last updated on: 25 November 2024.

Liv Hovde (born 25 October 2005) is an American tennis player. She has a career-high WTA singles ranking of world No. 245, achieved on 21 October 2024, and a doubles ranking of No. 354, achieved on 16 September 2024.

== Career ==
=== Juniors ===
On the ITF Junior Circuit, Hovde had a career-high combined ranking of No. 3, achieved on 28 November 2022. She reached the semifinals of the 2022 Australian Open girls' singles and the quarterfinals of the 2022 French Open girls' singles.

Her biggest junior success was winning the 2022 Wimbledon girls' singles, defeating Luca Udvardy in the final.

=== 2024: WTA Tour & WTA 1000 debuts ===
Ranked No. 286, Hovde received a wildcard for the qualifying competition and reached the main draw at Indian Wells with wins over Aliaksandra Sasnovich and Harriet Dart, making her WTA Tour and WTA 1000 debut. She lost in the first round to Lesia Tsurenko.

Ranked No. 252, she received a wildcard for the qualifying competition at the US Open, where she lost in the first round to Nastasja Schunk.

Partnering Kayla Cross, Hovde reached the doubles final at the Fifth Third Charleston 125, losing to Nuria Brancaccio and Leyre Romero Gormaz.

== WTA Challenger finals ==
=== Doubles: 1 (runner-up) ===
Result	W–L	Date	Tournament	Surface	Partner	Opponents	Score
Loss	0–1	Nov 2024	WTA 125 Charleston, United States	Clay	(Canada) Kayla Cross	(Italy) Nuria Brancaccio (Spain) Leyre Romero Gormaz	6–7^{(6–8)}, 2–6

== ITF Circuit finals ==
=== Singles: 5 (4 titles, 2 runner-up) ===
Legend W60/75 tournaments W25/35 tournaments W15 tournaments	Finals by surface Hard (2–2) Clay (2–0)

Result	W-L	Date	Tournament	Tier	Surface	Opponent	Score
Win	1–0	Sep 2022	ITF Lubbock, United States	W15	Hard	(Canada) Carson Branstine	7–6^{(2)}, 6–1
Win	2–0	Oct 2022	ITF Fort Worth, United States	W25	Hard	(United States) Reese Brantmeier	7–6^{(1)}, 6–4
Win	3–0	May 2023	ITF Bethany Beach, United States	W25	Clay	(United States) Raveena Kingsley	6–4, 6–7^{(5)}, 6–2
Loss	3–1	Jan 2024	ITF Rome, United States	W75	Hard (i)	(United States) McCartney Kessler	4–6, 1–6
Win	4–1	Apr 2024	ITF Boca Raton, United States	W35	Clay	(United States) Akasha Urhobo	3–6, 6–4, 6–2
Loss	4–2	Jun 2024	ITF Guimarães, Portugal	W75	Hard	(Portugal) Francisca Jorge	3–6, 4–6

=== Doubles: 4 (3 titles, 1 runner-up) ===
Legend W60 tournaments W25/35 tournaments	Finals by surface Hard (3–1) Clay

Result	W–L	Date	Tournament	Tier	Surface	Partner	Opponents	Score
Win	1–0	Oct 2023	ITF Redding, United States	W25	Hard	(United States) Clervie Ngounoue	(Canada) Kayla Cross (Colombia) María Herazo González	6–3, 7–5
Loss	1–1	Oct 2023	ITF Toronto, Canada	W60	Hard (i)	(Canada) Kayla Cross	(United States) Carmen Corley (United States) Ivana Corley	7–6^{(6)}, 3–6, [3–10]
Win	2–1	Oct 2023	ITF Edmonton, Canada	W25	Hard (i)	(Canada) Kayla Cross	(United States) Allura Zamarripa (United States) Maribella Zamarripa	4–6, 6–4, [10–7]
Win	3–1	Jan 2024	ITF Loughborough, United Kingdom	W35	Hard (i)	(Canada) Ella McDonald	(United Kingdom) Alicia Barnett (United Kingdom) Sarah Beth Grey	4–6, 6–2, [10–7]

== Junior Grand Slam finals ==
=== Girls' singles: 1 (title) ===
Result	Year	Tournament	Surface	Opponent	Score
Win	2022	Wimbledon	Grass	(Hungary) Luca Udvardy	6–3, 6–4
