= Anca Todoni =

Romanian tennis player (born 2004)

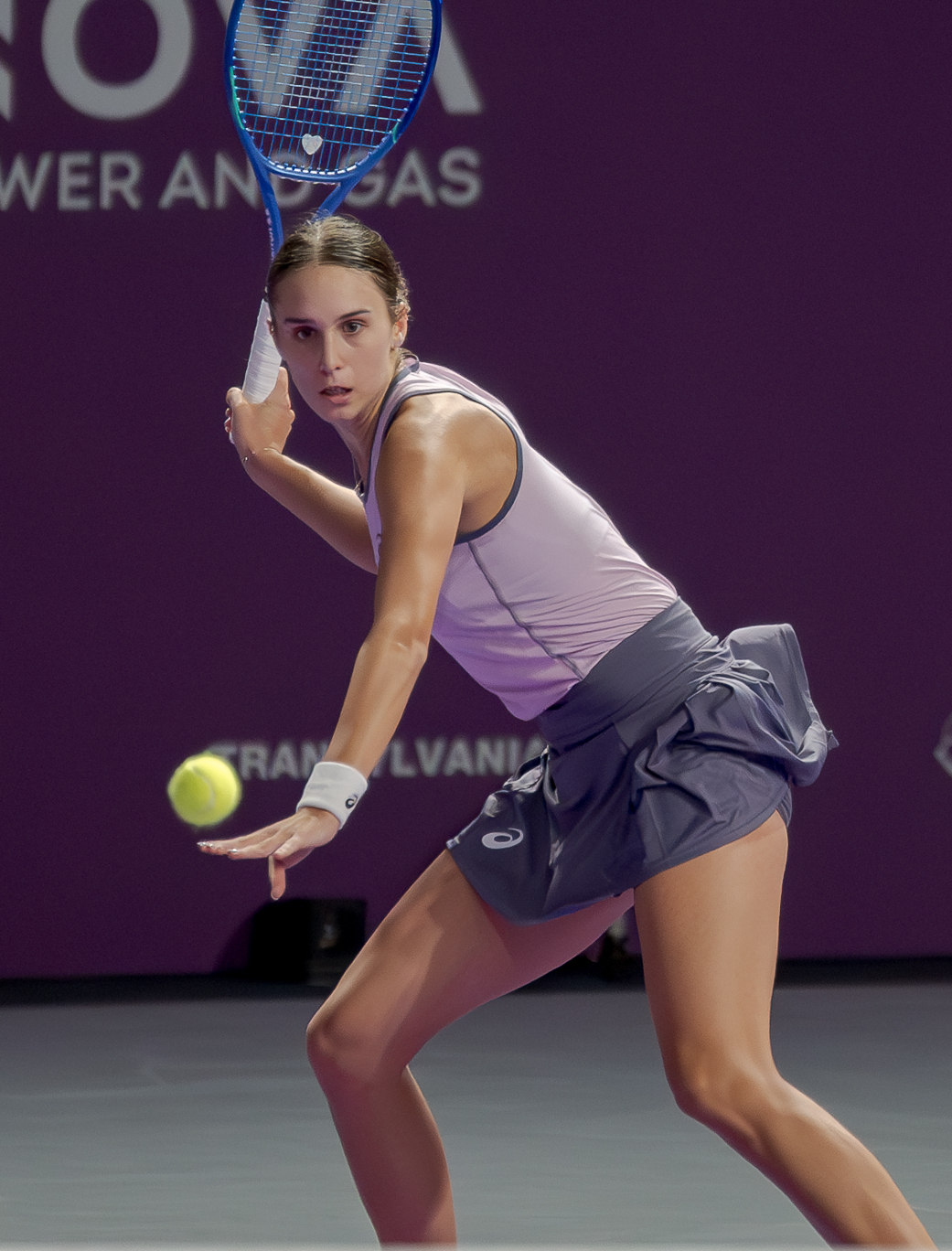
- Todoni at the 2025 Transylvania Open
- Full name: Anca Alexia Todoni
- Country (sports): Romania
- Born: 10 October 2004 (age 22) Timișoara, Romania
- Plays: Right (two-handed backhand)
- Prize money: $663,482

Singles
- Career record: 154–70
- Career titles: 4 WTA 125
- Highest ranking: No. 83 (31 March 2025)

Grand Slam singles results
- Australian Open: 1R (2025)
- French Open: 1R (2025)
- Wimbledon: 2R (2024)
- US Open: Q1 (2024, 2025)

Doubles
- Career record: 34–19
- Career titles: 4 ITF
- Highest ranking: No. 275 (27 January 2025)

Team competitions
- BJK Cup: 1–2

Anca Alexia Todoni (born 10 October 2004) is a Romanian inactive tennis player. She has a career-high WTA singles ranking of 83, achieved on 31 March 2025, and a best doubles ranking of world No. 275, reached on 27 January 2025.

== Early life ==
Anca Todoni was born on 10 October 2004 in Timișoara, Romania. She has a younger sister, Cristiana (born 2006), who is also a tennis player. Todoni began playing tennis at the age of six, after a doctor recommended that she take up an outdoor sport because of health problems during childhood. Her father, Călin Todoni, who had played tennis for several years, encouraged her to try the sport.

Todoni trained at CSM Timișoara under coach Paul Tetileanu, who worked with her for nearly 11 years and also coached her younger sister. She won her first tennis tournament at the age of ten in her hometown. Growing up, she regarded Simona Halep as her childhood tennis idol and preferred playing on clay courts.

At approximately 15 years old, Todoni began working with coach Artemon Apostu-Efremov, following an introduction by Adrian Cruciat, who had known her family in Timișoara. She subsequently moved to Bucharest to continue her training.

== Career ==
=== 2024: WTA Tour, major & top 150 debuts, two WTA 125 titles ===
In February, Todoni made her WTA Tour main-draw debut at the Transylvania Open, after receiving a wildcard, but lost in the first round to qualifier Erika Andreeva.

In April, ranked No. 217, she qualified for the singles main draw at the Copa Colsanitas in Bogotá, Colombia, and defeated Lucrezia Stefanini in the first round before losing her next match to Camila Osorio.

In June, she won her first WTA 125 title in Bari, with wins over Fiona Ferro and Elvina Kalieva in the first and second rounds, Eva Lys and top seeded Nadia Podoroska in the quarterfinal and the semifinal, before defeating Panna Udvardy in the final. As a result, she reached the top 150 in the singles rankings, at world No. 136 on 10 June 2024.

Ranked No. 141, she qualified for the main draw at Wimbledon making her Grand Slam tournament debut, and recorded her first Major win over lucky loser Olga Danilović. She went out in round two against second seed Coco Gauff.

Todoni reached the second round at the Iași Open when her opening opponent, Aliona Falei, retired injured but she lost to Olga Danilovic.

In November, Todoni won her second WTA 125 tournament at the Bolivia Open, defeating Emiliana Arango in the final. She continued her good form the following week at the WTA 125 Cali Open in Colombia, where she reached the quarterfinals with wins over qualifier Martina Okáľová, and Solana Sierra, before losing to second seed and eventual champion, Irina-Camelia Begu.

=== 2025: Top 100 debut, two WTA 125 titles and injury ===
Todoni started her 2025 season by qualifying for the Brisbane International, where she defeated Cristina Bucșa from a break down, before losing to 12th seed Linda Nosková in the second round. She then qualified for the main draw at the Australian Open for the first time, but lost her opening match to fifth seed Zheng Qinwen.

Todoni entered the world's top 100 for the first time on 17 March 2025. The following week, she won her third WTA 125 title at the Antalya Challenger, defeating Leyre Romero Gormaz in the final. On 31 March, she reached a career-high singles ranking of world No. 83.

In April, Todoni represented Romania in the 2025 Billie Jean King Cup qualifiers in Tokyo, losing her singles matches against Marina Stakusic of Canada and Moyuka Uchijima of Japan. In May, she made her main-draw debut at the French Open, losing to third seed Jessica Pegula in the first round.

In June, Todoni successfully defended her title at the Bari Open, defeating third seed Anna Bondár in three sets. It was her fourth WTA 125 singles title and her second of the season, extending her unbeaten record in finals at that level to four. Later that month, she was eliminated in the first round of the Wimbledon Championships by Cristina Bucșa.

In September, Todoni reached her first WTA 125 doubles final at the Montreux Ladies Open, partnering Arantxa Rus. They lost to Oksana Selekhmeteva and Simona Waltert in straight sets. Her final match of the season came on 9 September at the WTA 125 tournament in San Sebastián, where she defeated Dalila Spiteri before withdrawing ahead of her second-round match. She subsequently ended her season early because of medical problems and underwent surgery on her right shoulder later that year.

=== 2026: Extended absence ===
Todoni remained sidelined throughout much of 2026 while recovering from shoulder surgery performed in Madrid. In an August interview, she revealed that complications following the procedure had extended her expected recovery period from six months to between nine and twelve months. Although she resumed intensive training during the summer, her competitive return was postponed to allow a more complete recovery and reduce the risk of reinjury. As of September 2026, she had not played a competitive match for a year.

== WTA 125 finals ==
=== Singles: 4 (4 titles) ===
Result	W–L	Date	Tournament	Surface	Opponent	Score
Win	1–0	Jun 2024	Bari Open, Italy	Clay	(Hungary) Panna Udvardy	6–4, 6–0
Win	2–0	Oct 2024	Bolivia Open, Bolivia	Clay	(Colombia) Emiliana Arango	7–6^{(7–5)}, 6–0
Win	3–0	Mar 2025	Antalya Challenger, Turkey	Clay	(Spain) Leyre Romero Gormaz	6–3, 6–2
Win	4–0	Jun 2025	Bari Open, Italy	Clay	(Hungary) Anna Bondár	6–7, 6–4, 6–4

=== Doubles: 1 (runner-up) ===
Result	W–L	Date	Tournament	Surface	Partner	Opponents	Score
Loss	0–1	Sep 2025	Montreux Ladies Open, Switzerland	Clay	(Netherlands) Arantxa Rus	Oksana Selekhmeteva (Switzerland) Simona Waltert	4–6, 1–6

== ITF Circuit finals ==
=== Singles: 9 (5 titles, 4 runner-ups) ===
Legend W50 tournaments (0–1) W25 tournaments (2–1) W15 tournaments (3–2)	Finals by surface Hard (0–2) Clay (5–2)

Result	W–L	Date	Tournament	Tier	Surface	Opponent	Score
Win	1–0	Oct 2022	ITF Antalya, Turkey	W15	Clay	(Romania) Patricia Maria Țig	6–2, 7–6^{(4)}
Loss	1–1	Dec 2022	ITF Antalya, Turkey	W15	Clay	(Japan) Mayuka Aikawa	1–6, 0–6
Loss	1–2	Feb 2023	ITF Sharm El Sheikh, Egypt	W15	Hard	(Italy) Dalila Spiteri	3–6, 7–6^{(4)}, 1–6
Win	2–2	Jun 2023	ITF Kranjska Gora, Slovenia	W15	Clay	(Switzerland) Paula Cembranos	6–1, 6–2
Win	3–2	Jun 2023	ITF Bucharest, Romania	W15	Clay	(Romania) Ștefania Bojică	6–4, 6–0
Loss	3–3	Jun 2023	ITF Kuršumlijska Banja, Serbia	W25	Clay	(Greece) Martha Matoula	2–6, 6–7^{(2)}
Win	4–3	Aug 2023	ITF Osijek, Croatia	W25	Clay	(North Macedonia) Lina Gjorcheska	6–4, 6–3
Win	5–3	Aug 2023	ITF Bistrița, Romania	W25	Clay	(Croatia) Lucija Ćirić Bagarić	7–5, 1–6, 6–2
Loss	5–4	Aug 2025	Saskatoon Challenger, Canada	W50	Hard	(Japan) Himeno Sakatsume	6–7^{(1)}, 3–6

=== Doubles: 6 (4 titles, 2 runner-ups) ===
Legend W75 tournaments (0–1) W50 tournaments (1–0) W25 tournaments (1–0) W15 tournaments (2–1)	Finals by surface Hard (0–1) Clay (4–1)

Result	W–L	Date	Tournament	Tier	Surface	Partnering	Opponents	Score
Loss	0–1	Feb 2023	ITF Sharm El Sheikh, Egypt	W15	Hard	(Romania) Sabina Dădaciu	(Slovakia) Katarína Kužmová; Darya Shauha	3–6, 7–6^{(5)}, [3–10]
Win	1–1	Mar 2023	ITF Heraklion, Greece	W15	Clay	(Lithuania) Patricija Paukštytė	(Israel) Shavit Kimchi (Slovakia) Nina Vargová	6–3, 6–7^{(7)}, [10–5]
Win	2–1	Jun 2023	ITF Kranjska Gora, Slovenia	W15	Clay	(Switzerland) Katerina Tsygourova	(Switzerland) Paula Cembranos (Estonia) Liisa Varul	6–1, 6–0
Win	3–1	Oct 2023	ITF Heraklion, Greece	W25	Clay	(Romania) Ilinca Amariei	(Austria) Melanie Klaffner (Austria) Sinja Kraus	6–0, 5–7, [10-1]
Win	4–1	Jun 2024	ITF Troisdorf, Germany	W50	Clay	(Cyprus) Raluca Șerban	(United States) Chiara Scholl (Germany) Yana Morderger	6–0, 6–3
Loss	4–2	Sep 2024	Šibenik Open, Croatia	W75	Clay	(Cyprus) Raluca Șerban	(Slovenia) Živa Falkner (Hungary) Amarissa Tóth	1–2 ret.
