= Leyre Romero Gormaz =

Spanish tennis player (born 2002)

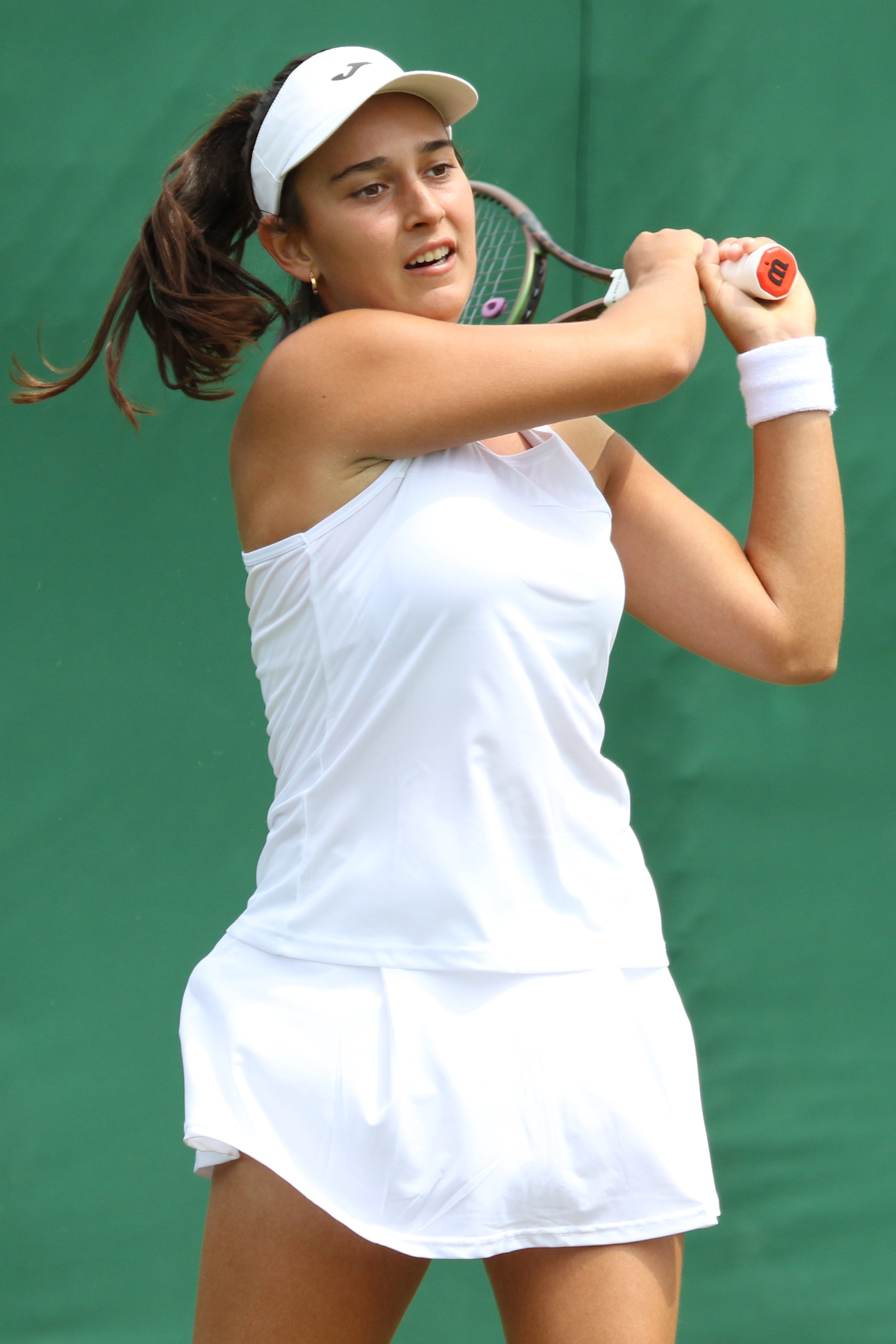
- Romero Gormaz at the 2023 Wimbledon Championships
- Country (sports): Spain
- Born: 6 April 2002 (age 24)
- Turned pro: 2020
- Plays: Left (two-handed backhand)
- Prize money: $784,410

Singles
- Career record: 257–185
- Career titles: 2 WTA 125
- Highest ranking: No. 111 (9 November 2026)
- Current ranking: No. 111 (9 November 2026)

Grand Slam singles results
- Australian Open: Q2 (2025)
- French Open: 2R (2025)
- Wimbledon: Q2 (2025)
- US Open: Q2 (2025)

Doubles
- Career record: 94–72
- Career titles: 4 WTA 125
- Highest ranking: No. 129 (25 November 2024)
- Current ranking: No. 420 (9 November 2026)
- Last updated on: 10 September 2026.

Leyre Romero Gormaz (born 6 April 2002) is a Spanish tennis player. She has a career-high singles ranking of No. 111 by the WTA, achieved on 9 November 2026, and a best doubles ranking of world No. 129, reached on 25 November 2024.

== Career ==
=== 2024: Three WTA 125 doubles titles ===
Partnering with Nuria Brancaccio, Romero Gormaz won the doubles at the WTA 125 Zavarovalnica Sava Ljubljana, defeating Lina Gjorcheska and Jil Teichmann in the final. They also won the Bolivia Open, overcoming Aliona Bolsova and Valeriya Strakhova in the final and the Fifth Third Charleston 125, where they defeated Kayla Cross and Liv Hovde in the championship match.

=== 2025: Two Antalya finals, major debut and first win ===
Romero Gormaz was runner-up at the Antalya Challenger, losing to Anca Todoni in the final.

Romero made her Grand Slam tournament debut at the 2025 French Open, after qualifying for her first main draw with a win over Linda Klimovičová.

== WTA 125 finals ==
=== Singles: 6 (2 titles, 3 runner-ups, 1 pending) ===
Result	W–L	Date	Tournament	Surface	Opponent	Score
Loss	0–1	Mar 2025	Antalya Challenger, Turkiye	Clay	(Romania) Anca Todoni	3–6, 2–6
Loss	0–2	Mar 2025	Antalya Challenger, Turkiye	Clay	(Argentina) Solana Sierra	3–6, 4–6
Win	1–2	Jun 2026	Foggia Open, Italy	Clay	(Italy) Tyra Caterina Grant	7–5, 0–6, 6–2
Loss	1–3	Oct 2026	Lisboa Belém Open, Portugal	Clay	(France) Clara Burel	4–6, 3–6
Win	2–3	Nov 2026	Cali Open, Colombia	Clay	(Canada) Bianca Andreescu	7–6^{(7–4)}, 6–3
Pending	–	Nov 2026	Colina Challenger, Chile	Clay	(Switzerland) Rebeka Masarova	

=== Doubles: 4 (4 titles) ===
Result	W–L	Date	Tournament	Surface	Partner	Opponents	Score
Win	1–0	Sep 2024	Ljubljana Open, Slovenia	Clay	(Italy) Nuria Brancaccio	(Switzerland) Jil Teichmann (North Macedonia) Lina Gjorcheska	5–7, 7–5, [10–7]
Win	2–0	Oct 2024	Bolivia Open, Santa Cruz	Clay	(Italy) Nuria Brancaccio	(Spain) Aliona Bolsova (Ukraine) Valeriya Strakhova	6–4, 6–4
Win	3–0	Nov 2024	Charleston Pro, United States	Clay	(Italy) Nuria Brancaccio	(Canada) Kayla Cross (United States) Liv Hovde	7–6^{(8–6)}, 6–2
Win	4–0	Oct 2025	Rio Ladies Open, Brazil	Clay	(Croatia) Tara Würth	(Spain) Irene Burillo (Georgia (country)) Ekaterine Gorgodze	6–4, 6–1

== ITF Circuit finals ==
=== Singles: 11 (7 titles, 4 runner-ups) ===
Legend W100 tournaments W75 tournaments W25 tournaments W15 tournaments	Finals by surface Clay (7–4)

Result	W–L	Date	Tournament	Tier	Surface	Opponent	Score
Win	1–0	Jul 2021	ITF Cairo, Egypt	W15	Clay	(Australia) Tina Nadine Smith	7–5, 7–6^{(4)}
Win	2–0	Jul 2021	ITF Cairo, Egypt	W15	Clay	(Germany) Luisa Meyer auf der Heide	6–2, 6–3
Win	3–0	Jun 2022	ITF Denain, France	W25	Clay	(Spain) Aliona Bolsova	6–4, 3–6, 6–4
Win	4–0	Aug 2022	ITF Oldenzaal, Netherlands	W25	Clay	Ekaterina Makarova	6–4, 7–6^{(2)}
Win	5–0	Sep 2022	ITF Marbella, Spain	W25	Clay	(Spain) Carlota Martínez Círez	6–7^{(2)}, 6–2, 6–0
Win	6–0	Sep 2022	ITF Jablonec nad Nisou, Czech Republic	W25	Clay	(Japan) Misaki Matsuda	6–1, 7–6^{(1)}
Loss	6–1	Oct 2022	ITF Šibenik, Croatia	W25	Clay	(Spain) Jéssica Bouzas Maneiro	3–6, 3–6
Loss	6–2	Oct 2023	ITF Santa Margherita di Pula, Italy	W25	Clay	(Slovenia) Veronika Erjavec	6–2, 4–6, 5–7
Loss	6–3	May 2024	Open Villa de Madrid, Spain	W100	Clay	(Japan) Moyuka Uchijima	7–5, 4–6, 5–7
Win	7–3	Jun 2024	ITF Caserta, Italy	W75	Clay	(Switzerland) Jil Teichmann	6–2, 4–6, 6–4
Loss	7–4	Apr 2026	ITF Portorož, Slovenia	W75	Clay	(Spain) Sara Sorribes Tormo	4–6, 1–6

=== Doubles: 11 (5 titles, 6 runner-ups) ===
Legend W100 tournaments W60/75 tournaments W40/50 tournaments W25/35 tournaments W15 tournaments	Finals by surface Hard (1–1) Clay (4–5)

Result	W–L	Date	Tournament	Tier	Surface	Partner	Opponents	Score
Win	1–0	Jul 2021	ITF Cairo, Egypt	W15	Clay	(Spain) Claudia Hoste Ferrer	(Netherlands) Jasmijn Gimbrère (Netherlands) Demi Tran	6–1, 4–6, [11–9]
Loss	1–1	May 2022	ITF Santa Margherita di Pula, Italy	W25	Clay	(Netherlands) Arantxa Rus	(Lithuania) Justina Mikulskytė (Slovenia) Nika Radišić	6–4, 5–6, [7–10]
Loss	1–2	Jun 2022	ITF Prokuplje, Serbia	W25	Clay	(Croatia) Tara Würth	(Kazakhstan) Zhibek Kulambayeva (India) Prarthana Thombare	w/o
Win	2–2	Jul 2022	ITF Getxo, Spain	W25	Clay	(Spain) Jéssica Bouzas Maneiro	(South Korea) Park So-hyun (Greece) Sapfo Sakellaridi	7–5, 6–0
Loss	2–3	Jul 2022	ITF Darmstadt, Germany	W25	Clay	(Spain) Jéssica Bouzas Maneiro	(Estonia) Elena Malõgina (France) Alice Robbe	5–7, 5–7
Win	3–3	Aug 2022	ITF Gran Canaria, Spain	W60	Clay	(Spain) Jéssica Bouzas Maneiro	(Spain) Lucía Cortez Llorca (Spain) Rosa Vicens Mas	1–6, 7–5, [10–6]
Win	4–3	Sep 2022	ITF Marbella, Spain	W25	Clay	(Spain) Jéssica Bouzas Maneiro	(Argentina) Julia Riera (Chile) Daniela Seguel	6–4, 6–2
Win	5–3	Feb 2023	ITF Porto, Portugal	W40	Hard (i)	(Georgia (country)) Ekaterine Gorgodze	(Portugal) Matilde Jorge (Croatia) Tara Würth	6–4, 2–6, [11–9]
Loss	5–4	Aug 2023	ITF Gran Canaria, Spain	W100	Clay	(Netherlands) Arantxa Rus	(Hungary) Tímea Babos (Hungary) Anna Bondár	4–6, 6–3, [4–10]
Loss	5–5	Mar 2024	ITF Santo Domingo, Dominican Republic	W35	Hard	(Italy) Camilla Rosatello	(United States) Carmen Corley (United States) Ivana Corley	2–6, 7–6^{(3)}, [5–10]
Loss	5–6	Aug 2024	ITF Cordenons, Italy	W75	Clay	(Italy) Nuria Brancaccio	(Spain) Yvonne Cavallé Reimers (Italy) Aurora Zantedeschi	5–7, 6–2, [5–10]
