= Nuria Brancaccio =

Italian tennis player (born 2000)

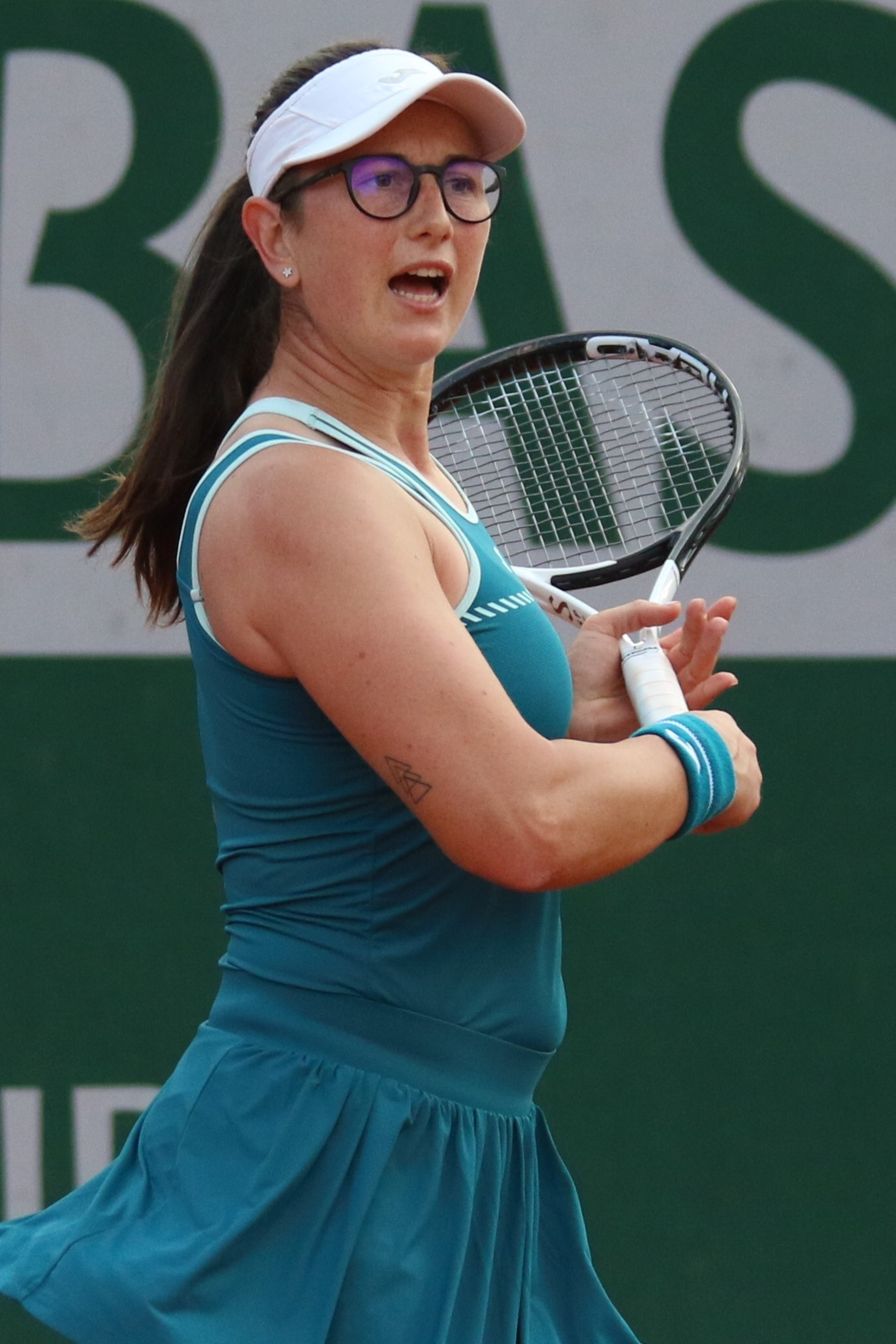
- Brancaccio at the 2023 French Open
- Country (sports): Italy
- Born: 24 June 2000 (age 26) Torre del Greco, Italy
- Plays: Right (two-handed backhand)
- Prize money: $664,589

Singles
- Career record: 326–230
- Career titles: 7 ITF
- Highest ranking: No. 150 (27 October 2025)
- Current ranking: No. 227 (19 October 2026)

Grand Slam singles results
- Australian Open: Q1 (2024, 2025, 2026)
- French Open: Q2 (2025)
- Wimbledon: Q1 (2023, 2025, 2026)
- US Open: Q1 (2023, 2025, 2026)

Doubles
- Career record: 117–112
- Career titles: 3 WTA 125, 4 ITF
- Highest ranking: No. 127 (30 June 2025)
- Current ranking: No. 328 (19 October 2026)
Medal record
Mediterranean Games
Silver medal – second place	2022 Oran	Women's singles
Bronze medal – third place	2022 Oran	Women's doubles
- Last updated on: 25 October 2026.

Nuria Brancaccio (born 24 June 2000) is an Italian tennis player. She has a career-high singles ranking by the WTA of 150, achieved on 27 October 2025. She also has a career-high doubles ranking of world No. 127, reached on 30 June 2025.

Brancaccio has won three doubles titles at WTA Challenger-level. She has reached eleven career singles finals on the ITF World Tour, with a record of five wins.

== Personal life ==
She has a Spanish mother and an Italian father. Her brother Raúl Brancaccio is also a tennis player.

== Career ==
=== 2021–2023: WTA Tour debut, WTA 125 final ===
Brancaccio made her WTA Tour main-draw debut at the 2021 Italian Open in Rome, where she received a wildcard entry, partnering fellow Italian Lucia Bronzetti.

At the 2022 Mediterranean Games, she won the silver medal in singles and the bronze medal in doubles along Aurora Zantedeschi.

In September 2022, Brancaccio reached her maiden final at the WTA 125 level at the Bari Open in Italy, where she lost to Austrian player Julia Grabher, in straight sets.

=== 2024–2025: WTA 125 doubles titles ===
Partnered with Leyre Romero Gormaz, Brancaccio won the doubles title at the WTA 125 2024 Ljubljana Open, defeating Lina Gjorcheska and Jil Teichmann in the final. They also won the doubles draw at the 2024 Bolivia Open, overcoming Aliona Bolsova and Valeriya Strakhova in the final, and the 2024 Fifth Third Charleston 125, where they defeated Kayla Cross and Liv Hovde in the championship match.

== Grand Slam performance timeline ==
Key
W	F	SF	QF	#R	RR	Q#	DNQ	A	NH

(W) winner; (F) finalist; (SF) semifinalist; (QF) quarterfinalist; (#R) rounds 4, 3, 2, 1; (RR) round-robin stage; (Q#) qualification round; (DNQ) did not qualify; (A) absent; (NH) not held; (SR) strike rate (events won / competed); (W–L) win–loss record.
To avoid confusion and double counting, these charts are updated at the conclusion of a tournament or when the player's participation has ended.

== WTA 125 finals ==
=== Singles: 2 (runner-ups) ===
Result	W–L	Date	Tournament	Surface	Opponent	Score
Loss	0–1	Sep 2022	Bari Open, Italy	Clay	(Austria) Julia Grabher	4–6, 2–6
Loss	0–2	Sep 2025	Tolentino Open, Italy	Clay	(Ukraine) Oleksandra Oliynykova	2–6, 0–6

=== Doubles: 4 (3 titles, 1 runner-up) ===
Result	W–L	Date	Tournament	Surface	Partner	Opponents	Score
Win	1–0	Sep 2024	Ljubljana Open, Slovenia	Clay	(Spain) Leyre Romero Gormaz	(Switzerland) Jil Teichmann (North Macedonia) Lina Gjorcheska	5–7, 7–5, [10–7]
Win	2–0	Oct 2024	Bolivia Open, Bolivia	Clay	(Spain) Leyre Romero Gormaz	(Spain) Aliona Bolsova (Ukraine) Valeriya Strakhova	6–4, 6–4
Win	3–0	Nov 2024	Charleston Pro, United States	Clay	(Spain) Leyre Romero Gormaz	(Canada) Kayla Cross (United States) Liv Hovde	7–6^{(6)}, 6–2
Loss	3–1	Sep 2025	Tolentino Open, Italy	Clay	(Italy) Silvia Ambrosio	(Czech Republic) Jesika Malečková (Czech Republic) Miriam Škoch	3–6, 6–3, [8–10]

== ITF Circuit finals ==
=== Singles: 15 (7 titles, 8 runner-ups) ===
Legend W75 tournaments (1–2) W50 tournaments (1–0) W25/35 tournaments (4–3) W15 tournaments (1–3)	Finals by surface Clay (7–8)

Result	W–L	Date	Tournament	Tier	Surface	Opponent	Score
Loss	0–1	Feb 2021	ITF Antalya, Turkey	W15	Clay	(Bosnia and Herzegovina) Dea Herdželaš	7–6^{(1)}, 2–6, 5–7
Win	1–1	Mar 2021	ITF Antalya, Turkey	W15	Clay	(South Korea) Jang Su-jeong	7–5, 6–4
Loss	1–2	Mar 2021	ITF Antalya, Turkey	W15	Clay	(South Korea) Park So-hyun	4–6, 0–6
Loss	1–3	Apr 2021	ITF Antalya, Turkey	W15	Clay	(Ukraine) Anastasiya Soboleva	0–6, 6–7^{(5)}
Loss	1–4	Jun 2021	Grado Tennis Cup, Italy	W25	Clay	(Spain) Nuria Párrizas Díaz	3–6, 7–5, 2–6
Win	2–4	Jan 2023	ITF Buenos Aires, Argentina	W25	Clay	(Argentina) Julia Riera	6–4, 4–6, 7–5
Loss	2–5	Jan 2023	ITF Buenos Aires	W25	Clay	(Spain) Carlota Martínez Círez	4–6, 7–5, 3–6
Win	3–5	Jun 2024	ITF Tarvisio, Italy	W35	Clay	(Italy) Dalila Spiteri	6–4, 6–2
Win	4–5	Jul 2024	ITF Rome, Italy	W35	Clay	(United States) Varvara Lepchenko	7–6^{(6)}, 6–1
Loss	4–6	Sep 2024	ITF Santa Margherita di Pula, Italy	W35	Clay	(Czech Republic) Julie Štruplová	7–5, 6–7^{(5)}, 2–6
Win	5–6	Apr 2025	ITF Santa Margherita di Pula	W35	Clay	(Germany) Nastasja Schunk	6–7^{(2)}, 6–4, 6–1
Loss	5–7	Jun 2025	ITF Bucharest, Romania	W75	Clay	(Slovenia) Tamara Zidanšek	1–6, 5–7
Win	6–7	Jul 2025	ITF Aschaffenburg, Germany	W50	Clay	(Czech Republic) Nikola Bartůňková	4–6, 6–4, 6–4
Win	7–7	Jul 2025	Internazionali di Cordenons, Italy	W75	Clay	(Slovenia) Veronika Erjavec	6–2, 6–1
Loss	7–8	Jul 2026	Internazionali di Cordenons	W75	Clay	(Serbia) Mia Ristić	3–6, 3–6

=== Doubles: 14 (5 titles, 9 runner-ups) ===
Legend W60/75 tournaments (1–3) W50 tournaments (1–0) W25 tournaments (1–5) W15 tournaments (2–1)	Finals by surface Hard (1–2) Clay (4–7)

Result	W–L	Date	Tournament	Tier	Surface	Partner	Opponents	Score
Win	1–0	Jul 2019	ITF Tabarka, Tunisia	W15	Clay	(Italy) Federica Arcidiacono	(Spain) Paula Arias Manjón (Germany) Julyette Steur	6–4, 4–6, [10–6]
Loss	1–1	Aug 2019	ITF Sezze, Italy	W25	Clay	(Italy) Federica Sacco	(Kazakhstan) Anna Danilina (Russia) Ekaterina Yashina	5–7, 4–6
Win	2–1	Feb 2020	ITF Monastir, Tunisia	W15	Hard	(Italy) Federica Rossi	(Czech Republic) Miriam Kolodziejová (Czech Republic) Jesika Malečková	5–7, 6–3, [10–5]
Loss	2–2	Feb 2020	ITF Heraklion, Greece	W15	Clay	(Denmark) Olga Helmi	(Italy) Tatiana Pieri (Italy) Dalila Spiteri	6–7^{(3)}, 1–6
Loss	2–3	Jun 2021	ITF Wrocław, Poland	W25	Clay	(Turkey) İpek Öz	(Poland) Anna Hertel (Poland) Martyna Kubka	6–7^{(2)}, 6–3, [7–10]
Loss	2–4	Jan 2022	ITF Monastir, Tunisia	W25	Hard	(Italy) Lisa Pigato	(Hong Kong) Eudice Chong (Hong Kong) Cody Wong	2–6, 3–6
Win	3–4	Jun 2022	ITF Brescia, Italy	W60	Clay	(Italy) Lisa Pigato	(Kazakhstan) Zhibek Kulambayeva (Latvia) Diāna Marcinkēviča	6–4, 6–1
Loss	3–5	Jun 2022	Macha Lake Open, Czech Republic	W60	Clay	(Greece) Despina Papamichail	(Czech Republic) Karolína Kubáňová (Czech Republic) Aneta Kučmová	2–6, 6–7^{(9)}
Loss	3–6	Oct 2022	ITF Santa Margherita di Pula, Italy	W25	Clay	(Italy) Angelica Moratelli	(United States) Jessie Aney (Greece) Sapfo Sakellaridi	6–7^{(2)}, 5–7
Loss	3–7	Oct 2023	ITF Santa Margherita di Pula	W25	Clay	(Italy) Angelica Moratelli	(Slovenia) Veronika Erjavec (Lithuania) Justina Mikulskytė	6–7^{(6)}, 0–6
Win	4–7	Oct 2023	ITF Santa Margherita di Pula	W25	Clay	(Italy) Eleonora Alvisi	(Italy) Anastasia Abbagnato (Italy) Virginia Ferrara	6–2, 2–6, [10–6]
Loss	4–8	Aug 2024	Internazionali di Cordenons, Italy	W75	Clay	(Spain) Leyre Romero Gormaz	(Spain) Yvonne Cavallé Reimers (Italy) Aurora Zantedeschi	5–7, 6–2, [5–10]
Loss	4–9	Jul 2026	ITF The Hague, Netherlands	W75	Clay	(Italy) Federica Urgesi	(Netherlands) Britt du Pree (Netherlands) Sarah van Emst	5–7, 3–6
Win	5–9	Oct 2026	ITF Heraklion, Greece	W50	Clay	(Greece) Despina Papamichail	(Armenia) Ani Amiraghyan; Elina Nepliy	w/o
