= 2025 Antalya Challenger 1 – Singles =

Singles
- 2025 Antalya Challenger 1

Final
- Champion: (Romania) Anca Todoni
- Runner-up: (Spain) Leyre Romero Gormaz
- Score: 6–3, 6–2

Events
Singles	Doubles
← 2024 ·	Antalya Challenger	· 2025 →

Anca Todoni won the singles title at the 2025 Antalya Challenger 1, defeating Leyre Romero Gormaz in the final, 6–3, 6–2.

Jéssica Bouzas Maneiro was the reigning champion, but she chose to compete in Miami instead.

== Seeds ==
1. (Colombia) Emiliana Arango (first round)
2. (France) Diane Parry (first round)
3. (Netherlands) Arantxa Rus (quarterfinals)
4. (Switzerland) Jil Teichmann (second round)
5. (Argentina) María Lourdes Carlé (second round)
6. (Romania) Anca Todoni (champion)
7. (Spain) Nuria Párrizas Díaz (first round)
8. (China) Wei Sijia (first round)

== Draw ==
=== Key ===
- Q = Qualifier
- WC = Wild card
- LL = Lucky loser
- Alt = Alternate
- ITF = ITF entry
- PR = Protected ranking
- SR = Special ranking
- SE = Special exempt
- JE = Junior exempt
- JR = Junior Accelerator Programme entrant
- CO = College Accelerator Programme entrant
- NG = Next Gen Accelerator Program entrant
- w/o = Walkover
- r = Retired
- d = Defaulted

=== Finals ===
Semifinals
(France) Clara Burel	2	2^{r}
6	(Romania) Anca Todoni	6	3
(Spain) Leyre Romero Gormaz	4	6	6
(Poland) Maja Chwalińska	6	3	4

Final
6	(Romania) Anca Todoni	6	6
(Spain) Leyre Romero Gormaz	3	2

=== Top half ===
First round
1	(Colombia) E Arango	6	5	2
(France) C Paquet	3	7	6
Q	(Slovenia) T Zidanšek	2	6	6
Q	(Germany) N Noha Akugue	6	3	4
Q	E Pridankina	7^{7}	4	2
(Latvia) D Semeņistaja	6^{3}	6	6
(France) C Burel	6	2	6
7	(Spain) N Párrizas Díaz	1	6	3
3	(Netherlands) A Rus	4	6	6
WC	(Turkey) A Aksu	6	0	3
A Zakharova	6	6
WC	(Turkey) A Kumru	1	4
(Croatia) J Fett	2	6	6
Q	(France) M Rouvroy	6	1	3
(Hungary) P Udvardy	6	4	2
6	(Romania) A Todoni	4	6	6

Second round
(France) C Paquet	6	6
Q	(Slovenia) T Zidanšek	4	3
(Latvia) D Semeņistaja	2	2
(France) C Burel	6	6
3	(Netherlands) A Rus	6	6
A Zakharova	1	2
(Croatia) J Fett	3	2
6	(Romania) A Todoni	6	6

Quarterfinals
(France) C Paquet	2	4
(France) C Burel	6	6
3	(Netherlands) A Rus	7^{7}	4	2
6	(Romania) A Todoni	6^{4}	6	6

Semifinals
(France) C Burel	2	2^{r}
6	(Romania) A Todoni	6	3

=== Bottom half ===
First round
8	(China) S Wei	4	4
(Spain) L Romero Gormaz	6	6
O Selekhmeteva	5	0
(Germany) E Seidel	7	6
(Andorra) V Jiménez Kasintseva	6	6
WC	(Turkey) D Dilek	3	0
(Argentina) J Riera	2	6	5
4	(Switzerland) J Teichmann	6	4	7
5	(Argentina) ML Carlé	6	6
(Czech Republic) S Bejlek	2	1
(Poland) M Chwalińska	6	6
(Kazakhstan) Z Diyas	3	1
WC	(Turkey) Ç Büyükakçay	2	1
(France) E Jacquemot	6	6
(Slovenia) V Erjavec	7	6
2	(France) D Parry	5	4

Second round
(Spain) L Romero Gormaz	6	6
(Germany) E Seidel	1	2
(Andorra) V Jiménez Kasintseva	6	6
4	(Switzerland) J Teichmann	2	2
5	(Argentina) ML Carlé	6^{2}	4
(Poland) M Chwalińska	7^{7}	6
(France) E Jacquemot	6	6
(Slovenia) V Erjavec	1	4

Quarterfinals
(Spain) L Romero Gormaz	6	6
(Andorra) V Jiménez Kasintseva	1	0
(Poland) M Chwalińska	6	6^{7}	7
(France) E Jacquemot	0	7^{9}	5

Semifinals
(Spain) L Romero Gormaz	4	6	6
(Poland) M Chwalińska	6	3	4

== Qualifying ==
=== Seeds ===
1. (Hungary) Dalma Gálfi (qualifying competition)
2. (Slovenia) Tamara Zidanšek (qualified)
3. Tatiana Prozorova (first round)
4. (Germany) Mona Barthel (qualifying competition)
5. Elena Pridankina (qualified)
6. (Romania) Miriam Bulgaru (first round)
7. (Germany) Noma Noha Akugue (qualified)
8. (Turkey) İpek Öz (first round)

=== Qualifiers ===
1. (Germany) Noma Noha Akugue
2. (Slovenia) Tamara Zidanšek
3. (France) Margaux Rouvroy
4. Elena Pridankina

=== Qualifying draw ===
==== First qualifier ====
First round
1	(Hungary) Dalma Gálfi	5
(Slovenia) Dalila Jakupović	0^{r}
WC	(Latvia) Adelina Lachinova	7	2	0
7	(Germany) Noma Noha Akugue	5	6	6

Qualifying competition
1	(Hungary) Dalma Gálfi	6^{3}	4
7	(Germany) Noma Noha Akugue	7^{7}	6

==== Second qualifier ====
First round
2	(Slovenia) Tamara Zidanšek	3
(Spain) Ángela Fita Boluda	2^{r}
(Romania) Irina Bara	6	7
8	(Turkey) İpek Öz	1	5

Qualifying competition
2	(Slovenia) Tamara Zidanšek	6	6
(Romania) Irina Bara	3	4

==== Third qualifier ====
First round
3	Tatiana Prozorova	6	3	2
(France) Margaux Rouvroy	1	6	6
(United States) Makenna Jones	6	6
6	(Romania) Miriam Bulgaru	2	4

Qualifying competition
(France) Margaux Rouvroy	6	6
(United States) Makenna Jones	0	2

==== Fourth qualifier ====
First round
4	(Germany) Mona Barthel	6	6
WC	(Turkey) İrem Kurt	1	2
Daria Lodikova	4	2
5	Elena Pridankina	6	6

Qualifying competition
4	(Germany) Mona Barthel	3	6	5
5	Elena Pridankina	6	4	7
