= 2024 Antalya Challenger =

- Date: 26–31 March
- Edition: 1st
- Category: WTA 125
- Draw: 32S/16D
- Surface: Clay
- Location: Antalya, Turkey

Champions

Singles
- (Spain) Jéssica Bouzas Maneiro

Doubles
- (Italy) Angelica Moratelli / (Italy) Camilla Rosatello
Antalya Challenger	· 2025 →

The 2024 Antalya Challenger (also known as the Megasaray Hotels Open for sponsorship reasons) was a professional Women's tennis tournament played on outdoor clay courts. It was the first edition of the tournament which was also part of the 2024 WTA 125 tournaments. It took place at the Megasaray Tennis Academy in Antalya, Turkey between 26 and 31 March 2024.

== Singles main-draw entrants ==
=== Seeds ===
Country	Player	Rank^{1}	Seed
~~BEL~~	~~Greet Minnen~~	~~79~~	~~1~~
LAT	Darja Semeņistaja	109	2
AUT	Julia Grabher	111	3
ROU	Irina-Camelia Begu	126	4
ESP	Jéssica Bouzas Maneiro	127	5
CZE	Sára Bejlek	130	6
SRB	Olga Danilović	133	7
FRA	Fiona Ferro	138	8
HUN	Dalma Gálfi	144	9

- ^{1} Rankings as of 18 March 2024.

=== Other entrants ===
The following players received wildcards into the singles main draw:

- (Turkey) Çağla Büyükakçay
- Anastasiia Gureva
- (Turkey) Ada Kumru
- (Turkey) İpek Öz

The following players received entry into the main draw through protected ranking:

- (Slovenia) Polona Hercog
- (Croatia) Tara Würth

The following players received entry from the qualifying draw:

- (Slovenia) Veronika Erjavec
- (Poland) Katarzyna Kawa
- (Spain) Leyre Romero Gormaz
- (Romania) Elena-Gabriela Ruse

The following player received entry as a lucky loser:

- (France) Carole Monnet

=== Withdrawals ===
- (Belgium) Greet Minnen → replaced by (France) Carole Monnet

== Doubles main-draw entrants ==
=== Seeds ===
Country	Player	Country	Player	Rank^{1}	Seed
HUN	Tímea Babos		Vera Zvonareva	77	1
	Lidziya Marozava	BEL	Kimberley Zimmermann	146	2
ITA	Angelica Moratelli	ITA	Camilla Rosatello	164	3
CZE	Miriam Kolodziejová	CZE	Anna Sisková	166	4

- Rankings are as of 18 March 2024

=== Other entrants ===
The following pair received a wildcard into the doubles main draw:

- Anastasiia Gureva / Rada Zolotareva

== Champions ==
=== Singles ===
- (Spain) Jéssica Bouzas Maneiro def. (Romania) Irina-Camelia Begu 6–2, 4–6, 6–2

=== Doubles ===
- (Italy) Angelica Moratelli / (Italy) Camilla Rosatello def. (Hungary) Tímea Babos / Vera Zvonareva 6–3, 3–6, [15–13]
