= 2018 St. Petersburg Ladies' Trophy =

- Date: 29 January – 4 February
- Edition: 9th
- Category: WTA Premier
- Prize money: $776,000
- Surface: Hard (indoor)
- Location: Saint Petersburg, Russia
- Venue: Sibur Arena

Champions

Singles
- (Czech Republic) Petra Kvitová

Doubles
- (Switzerland) Timea Bacsinszky / (Russia) Vera Zvonareva
- St. Petersburg Ladies' Trophy

The 2018 St. Petersburg Ladies' Trophy was a professional tennis tournament played on indoor hard courts. It was the 9th edition of the tournament and third time as a WTA Premier tournament. It was part of the 2018 WTA Tour and was held between 29 January and 4 February 2018.

== Point distribution ==
| Event | W | F | SF | QF | Round of 16 | Round of 32 | Q | Q3 | Q2 | Q1 |
| Singles | 470 | 305 | 185 | 100 | 55 | 1 | 25 | 18 | 13 | 1 |
| Doubles | 470 | 305 | 185 | 100 | 1 | —N/a | —N/a | —N/a | —N/a | —N/a |

== Prize money ==
| Event | W | F | SF | QF | Round of 16 | Round of 32^{1} | Q3 | Q2 | Q1 |
| Singles | $132,740 | $70,880 | $37,850 | $20,350 | $10,915 | $6,925 | $3,110 | $1,650 | $920 |
| Doubles* | $41,520 | $22,180 | $12,120 | $6,165 | $3,350 | —N/a | —N/a | —N/a | —N/a |

_{^{1}Qualifiers prize money is also the Round of 32 prize money.}
_{*per team}

== Singles main draw entrants ==
=== Seeds ===
| Country | Player | Rank^{1} | Seed |
|---|---|---|---|
| DEN | Caroline Wozniacki | 2 | 1 |
| LAT | Jeļena Ostapenko | 7 | 2 |
| FRA | Caroline Garcia | 8 | 3 |
| FRA | Kristina Mladenovic | 11 | 4 |
| GER | Julia Görges | 12 | 5 |
| RUS | Anastasia Pavlyuchenkova | 18 | 6 |
| RUS | Elena Vesnina | 19 | 7 |
| RUS | Daria Kasatkina | 25 | 8 |

- ^{1} Rankings as of January 15, 2018.

=== Other entrants ===
The following players received wildcards into the singles main draw:

- (Czech Republic) Petra Kvitová
- (Russia) Anastasia Potapova
- (Russia) Elena Vesnina
- (Russia) Vera Zvonareva

The following players received entry from the qualifying draw:

- (Slovakia) Viktória Kužmová
- (Czech Republic) Tereza Martincová
- (Russia) Elena Rybakina
- (Italy) Roberta Vinci

The following player received entry as a lucky loser:

- (Germany) Andrea Petkovic

=== Withdrawals ===
Before the tournament

- (Romania) Simona Halep → replaced by (Germany) Andrea Petkovic
- (Croatia) Ana Konjuh → replaced by (Germany) Tatjana Maria
- (Belgium) Elise Mertens → replaced by (Croatia) Donna Vekić
- (Latvia) Anastasija Sevastova → replaced by (Czech Republic) Kateřina Siniaková
- (Czech Republic) Barbora Strýcová → replaced by (Greece) Maria Sakkari
- (Spain) Carla Suárez Navarro → replaced by (Germany) Mona Barthel

=== Retirements ===
- (Netherlands) Kiki Bertens

== Doubles main draw entrants ==
=== Seeds ===
| Country | Player | Country | Player | Rank^{1} | Seed |
|---|---|---|---|---|---|
| CAN | Gabriela Dabrowski | CHN | Xu Yifan | 29 | 1 |
| USA | Raquel Atawo | GER | Anna-Lena Grönefeld | 55 | 2 |
| USA | Nicole Melichar | CZE | Květa Peschke | 57 | 3 |
| CRO | Darija Jurak | CZE | Renata Voráčová | 86 | 4 |

- ^{1} Rankings as of January 15, 2018.

=== Other entrants ===
The following pair received a wildcard into the doubles main draw:

- (Russia) Valeriya Pogrebnyak / (Russia) Elena Rybakina

== Champions ==
=== Singles ===
- (Czech Republic) Petra Kvitová def. (France) Kristina Mladenovic, 6–1, 6–2

=== Doubles ===
- (Switzerland) Timea Bacsinszky / (Russia) Vera Zvonareva def. (Russia) Alla Kudryavtseva / (Slovenia) Katarina Srebotnik, 2–6, 6–1, [10–3]
