= 2018 St. Petersburg Ladies' Trophy – Doubles =

Doubles
- 2018 St. Petersburg Ladies' Trophy
- Final date: 16

Final
- Champions: (Switzerland) Timea Bacsinszky (Russia) Vera Zvonareva
- Runners-up: (Russia) Alla Kudryavtseva (Slovenia) Katarina Srebotnik
- Score: 2–6, 6–1, [10–3]

Details
- Seeds: 4

Events
Singles	Doubles
- St. Petersburg Ladies' Trophy

Jeļena Ostapenko and Alicja Rosolska were the defending champions, but Ostapenko chose not to participate this year. Rosolska played alongside Lara Arruabarrena, but lost in the first round to Alla Kudryavtseva and Katarina Srebotnik.

First-time pairings Timea Bacsinszky and Vera Zvonareva won the title, defeating Kudryavtseva and Srebotnik in the final, 2–6, 6–1, [10–3].

== Seeds ==
1. (Canada) Gabriela Dabrowski / (China) Xu Yifan (semifinals)
2. (United States) Raquel Atawo / (Germany) Anna-Lena Grönefeld (semifinals)
3. (United States) Nicole Melichar / (Czech Republic) Květa Peschke (first round)
4. (Croatia) Darija Jurak / (Czech Republic) Renata Voráčová (first round)

== Draw ==
Key

- Q = Qualifier
- WC = Wild card
- LL = Lucky loser
- Alt = Alternate
- ITF = ITF entry
- PR = Protected ranking
- SR = Special ranking
- SE = Special exempt
- JE = Junior exempt
- JR = Junior Accelerator Programme entrant
- CO = College Accelerator Programme entrant
- NG = Next Gen Accelerator Program entrant
- w/o = Walkover
- r = Retired
- d = Defaulted

=== Draw ===
First round
1	(Canada) G Dabrowski (China) Y Xu	6	6
(Russia) V Kudermetova (Belarus) L Marozava	2	4
(Romania) R Olaru (Ukraine) O Savchuk	3	2
(Italy) S Errani (Belgium) K Flipkens	6	6
4	(Croatia) D Jurak (Czech Republic) R Voráčová	3	3
(Russia) A Kalinskaya (Belarus) V Lapko	6	6
WC	(Russia) V Pogrebnyak (Russia) E Rybakina	0	0
(Switzerland) T Bacsinszky (Russia) V Zvonareva	6	6
(Spain) L Arruabarrena (Poland) A Rosolska	3	0
(Russia) A Kudryavtseva (Slovenia) K Srebotnik	6	6
(Germany) M Barthel (Germany) N Geuer	6	6
3	(United States) N Melichar (Czech Republic) K Peschke	1	2
(Russia) Y Sizikova (Ukraine) D Yastremska	6	6
(Russia) P Monova (Russia) A Potapova	1	3
(Russia) N Dzalamidze (Switzerland) X Knoll	2	2
2	(United States) R Atawo (Germany) A-L Grönefeld	6	6

Quarterfinals
1	(Canada) G Dabrowski (China) Y Xu	1	7^{7}	[10]
(Italy) S Errani (Belgium) K Flipkens	6	6^{5}	[6]
(Russia) A Kalinskaya (Belarus) V Lapko	6	3	[8]
(Switzerland) T Bacsinszky (Russia) V Zvonareva	3	6	[10]
(Russia) A Kudryavtseva (Slovenia) K Srebotnik	7	4	[10]
(Germany) M Barthel (Germany) N Geuer	5	6	[8]
(Russia) Y Sizikova (Ukraine) D Yastremska	3	1
2	(United States) R Atawo (Germany) A-L Grönefeld	6	6

Semifinals
1	(Canada) G Dabrowski (China) Y Xu	4	2
(Switzerland) T Bacsinszky (Russia) V Zvonareva	6	6
(Russia) A Kudryavtseva (Slovenia) K Srebotnik	6	3	[11]
2	(United States) R Atawo (Germany) A-L Grönefeld	4	6	[9]

Final
(Switzerland) T Bacsinszky (Russia) V Zvonareva	2	6	[10]
(Russia) A Kudryavtseva (Slovenia) K Srebotnik	6	1	[3]
