= 2018 St. Petersburg Ladies' Trophy – Singles =

Singles
- 2018 St. Petersburg Ladies' Trophy

Final
- Champion: (Czech Republic) Petra Kvitová
- Runner-up: (France) Kristina Mladenovic
- Score: 6–1, 6–2

Details
- Draw: 28 (4 Q / 4 WC )
- Seeds: 8

Events
Singles	Doubles
- St. Petersburg Ladies' Trophy

Kristina Mladenovic was the defending champion, but lost in the final to unseeded Petra Kvitová, 1–6, 2–6. As a result, unseeded Kvitová became the first left-handed player to win a singles title in Russia. She was also the first wildcard entrant to win the event.

== Seeds ==
The top four seeds received a bye into the second round.

1. (Denmark) Caroline Wozniacki (quarterfinals)
2. (Latvia) Jeļena Ostapenko (quarterfinals)
3. (France) Caroline Garcia (second round)
4. (France) Kristina Mladenovic (final)
5. (Germany) Julia Görges (semifinals)
6. (Russia) Anastasia Pavlyuchenkova (first round)
7. (Russia) Elena Vesnina (first round)
8. (Russia) Daria Kasatkina (semifinals)

== Draw ==
Key

- Q = Qualifier
- WC = Wild card
- LL = Lucky loser
- Alt = Alternate
- ITF = ITF entry
- PR = Protected ranking
- SR = Special ranking
- SE = Special exempt
- JE = Junior exempt
- JR = Junior Accelerator Programme entrant
- CO = College Accelerator Programme entrant
- NG = Next Gen Accelerator Program entrant
- w/o = Walkover
- r = Retired
- d = Defaulted

=== Finals ===
Semifinals
8	(Russia) Daria Kasatkina	6	3	2
4	(France) Kristina Mladenovic	3	6	6
5	(Germany) Julia Görges	5	6	2
WC	(Czech Republic) Petra Kvitová	7	4	6

Final
4	(France) Kristina Mladenovic	1	2
WC	(Czech Republic) Petra Kvitová	6	6

=== Top half ===
First round
WC	(Russia) A Potapova	6	6
(Germany) T Maria	2	4
(Germany) M Barthel	3	5
(France) A Cornet	6	7
Q	(Slovakia) V Kužmová	6	4	1
8	(Russia) D Kasatkina	1	6	6
(Romania) S Cîrstea	5	2
(Slovakia) D Cibulková	7	6
(Croatia) D Vekić	3	6	4
(Czech Republic) K Siniaková	6	2	6
(Russia) E Makarova	6	6
6	(Russia) A Pavlyuchenkova	4	4

Second round
1	(Denmark) C Wozniacki	6	6
WC	(Russia) A Potapova	0	1
(France) A Cornet	2	1
8	(Russia) D Kasatkina	6	6
4	(France) K Mladenovic	6	6
(Slovakia) D Cibulková	4	4
(Czech Republic) K Siniaková	7^{9}	7
(Russia) E Makarova	6^{7}	5

Quarterfinals
1	(Denmark) C Wozniacki	6^{2}	3
8	(Russia) D Kasatkina	7^{7}	6
4	(France) K Mladenovic	6	6
(Czech Republic) K Siniaková	4	3

Semifinals
8	(Russia) D Kasatkina	6	3	2
4	(France) K Mladenovic	3	6	6

=== Bottom half ===
First round
5	(Germany) J Görges	6	7^{7}
(Greece) M Sakkari	2	6^{5}
Q	(Italy) R Vinci	6	6
Q	(Czech Republic) T Martincová	2	2
(Switzerland) T Bacsinszky	4	3
Q	(Russia) E Rybakina	6	6
7/WC	(Russia) E Vesnina	2	0
WC	(Czech Republic) P Kvitová	6	6
(Romania) I-C Begu	7^{7}	6
LL	(Germany) A Petkovic	6^{5}	1
WC	(Russia) V Zvonareva	6	0
(Netherlands) K Bertens	4	0^{r}

Second round
5	(Germany) J Görges	7	6
Q	(Italy) R Vinci	5	0
Q	(Russia) E Rybakina	4	7^{8}	7^{7}
3	(France) C Garcia	6	6^{6}	6^{5}
WC	(Czech Republic) P Kvitová	6	1	6
(Romania) I-C Begu	3	6	1
WC	(Russia) V Zvonareva	6^{6}	3
2	(Latvia) J Ostapenko	7^{8}	6

Quarterfinals
5	(Germany) J Görges	6	6
Q	(Russia) E Rybakina	3	3
WC	(Czech Republic) P Kvitová	6	6
2	(Latvia) J Ostapenko	0	2

Semifinals
5	(Germany) J Görges	5	6	2
WC	(Czech Republic) P Kvitová	7	4	6

== Qualifying ==
=== Seeds ===
1. (Czech Republic) Kristýna Plíšková (second round)
2. (Russia) Natalia Vikhlyantseva (qualifying competition)
3. (United Kingdom) Heather Watson (first round)
4. (Belgium) Kirsten Flipkens (first round)
5. (France) Océane Dodin (second round)
6. (Spain) Lara Arruabarrena (first round)
7. (Russia) Ekaterina Alexandrova (first round)
8. (Germany) Andrea Petkovic (qualifying competition, lucky loser)

=== Qualifiers ===
1. (Czech Republic) Tereza Martincová
2. (Slovakia) Viktória Kužmová
3. (Italy) Roberta Vinci
4. (Russia) Elena Rybakina

=== Lucky loser ===
1. (Germany) Andrea Petkovic

=== Qualifying draw ===
==== First qualifier ====
First round
1	(Czech Republic) Kristýna Plíšková	6	6
(Turkey) Başak Eraydın	0	2
(Czech Republic) Tereza Martincová	6	6
WC	(Russia) Anastasia Frolova	3	1
(Bulgaria) Viktoriya Tomova	2	6	1
(Belarus) Vera Lapko	6	4	6
PR	(Serbia) Bojana Jovanovski Petrović	4	3
5	(France) Océane Dodin	6	6

Second round
1	(Czech Republic) Kristýna Plíšková	6	4	4
(Czech Republic) Tereza Martincová	3	6	6
(Belarus) Vera Lapko	7	6
5	(France) Océane Dodin	5	4

Qualifying competition
(Czech Republic) Tereza Martincová	6	5	6
(Belarus) Vera Lapko	4	7	1

==== Second qualifier ====
First round
2	(Russia) Natalia Vikhlyantseva	6	6
(Russia) Valentyna Ivakhnenko	2	1
(Slovakia) Jana Čepelová	7^{10}	2	6
(Italy) Sara Errani	6^{8}	6	3
WC	(Russia) Amina Anshba	4	2
(Slovakia) Viktória Kužmová	6	6
(Ukraine) Dayana Yastremska	4	6	6
7	(Russia) Ekaterina Alexandrova	6	3	2

Second round
2	(Russia) Natalia Vikhlyantseva	6	6
(Slovakia) Jana Čepelová	3	2
(Slovakia) Viktória Kužmová	6	3	6
(Ukraine) Dayana Yastremska	3	6	4

Qualifying competition
2	(Russia) Natalia Vikhlyantseva	2	5
(Slovakia) Viktória Kužmová	6	7

==== Third qualifier ====
First round
3	(United Kingdom) Heather Watson	3	4
(Italy) Roberta Vinci	6	6
(Italy) Jasmine Paolini	4	6	2
(Montenegro) Danka Kovinić	6	3	6
(Russia) Polina Monova	6	6
WC	(Russia) Valeriya Pogrebnyak	4	0
(Russia) Anna Kalinskaya	3	7	2
8	(Germany) Andrea Petkovic	6	5	6

Second round
(Italy) Roberta Vinci	6	6
(Montenegro) Danka Kovinić	1	2
(Russia) Polina Monova	3	2
8	(Germany) Andrea Petkovic	6	6

Qualifying competition
(Italy) Roberta Vinci	6	4	6
8	(Germany) Andrea Petkovic	1	6	3

==== Fourth qualifier ====
First round
4	(Belgium) Kirsten Flipkens	2	0
(Italy) Deborah Chiesa	6	6
(Bulgaria) Sesil Karatantcheva	6	3	3
(Croatia) Jana Fett	3	6	6
WC	(Russia) Elena Rybakina	3	6	6
(Russia) Veronika Kudermetova	6	3	2
(Uzbekistan) Sabina Sharipova	3	7^{7}	7
6	(Spain) Lara Arruabarrena	6	6^{4}	5

Second round
(Italy) Deborah Chiesa	6	2	6
(Croatia) Jana Fett	2	6	4
WC	(Russia) Elena Rybakina	6	6
(Uzbekistan) Sabina Sharipova	4	4

Qualifying competition
(Italy) Deborah Chiesa	1	3
WC	(Russia) Elena Rybakina	6	6
