= 2025 Antalya Challenger 1 – Doubles =

Doubles
- 2025 Antalya Challenger 1

Final
- Champions: (Poland) Maja Chwalińska (Czech Republic) Anastasia Dețiuc
- Runners-up: (Czech Republic) Jesika Malečková (Czech Republic) Miriam Škoch
- Score: 4–6, 6–3, [10–2]

Events
| Singles | Doubles |
| ← 2024 · | Antalya Challenger | · 2025 → |

Angelica Moratelli and Camilla Rosatello were the reigning champions, but Rosatello chose not to compete this year. Moratelli partnered Yvonne Cavallé Reimers, but they lost in the quarterfinals to Jesika Malečková and Miriam Škoch.

Maja Chwalińska and Anastasia Dețiuc won the title, after defeating Malečková and Škoch 4–6, 6–3, [10–2] in the final.

== Seeds ==
1. (Spain) Yvonne Cavallé Reimers / (Italy) Angelica Moratelli (quarterfinals)
2. (Japan) Nao Hibino / (Japan) Makoto Ninomiya (semifinals)
3. (Belgium) Magali Kempen / (United Kingdom) Maia Lumsden (first round)
4. Amina Anshba / Elena Pridankina (semifinals)

== Draw ==
=== Key ===
- Q = Qualifier
- WC = Wild card
- LL = Lucky loser
- Alt = Alternate
- SE = Special exempt
- PR = Protected ranking
- ITF = ITF entry
- JE = Junior exempt
- w/o = Walkover
- r = Retired
- d = Defaulted
- SR = Special ranking

=== Draw ===
First round
1 | (Spain) Y Cavallé Reimers (Italy) A Moratelli | 6 | 6
WC | (Turkey) D Dilek (Turkey) A Kumru | 2 | 1
(United Kingdom) M Brooks (United Kingdom) F Christie | 2 | 2
(Czech Republic) J Malečková (Czech Republic) M Škoch | 6 | 6
4 | A Anshba; E Pridankina | 7^{7} | 7
(United Kingdom) E Silva (Belgium) K Zimmermann | 6^{5} | 5
(United Kingdom) F Jones (United Kingdom) T Moore | 7 | 6
(Netherlands) I Haverlag (Poland) A Rosolska | 5 | 4
(Poland) M Chwalińska (Czech Republic) A Dețiuc | 6 | 6
(France) C Paquet (France) D Parry | 3 | 2
(Germany) E Seidel (Switzerland) J Teichmann | 4 | 6 | [10]
3 | (Belgium) M Kempen (United Kingdom) M Lumsden | 6 | 4 | [6]
(Slovenia) V Erjavec (Spain) L Romero Gormaz | 5 | 6 | [9]
(Colombia) E Arango (Argentina) J Riera | 7 | 3 | [11]
(Argentina) ML Carlé (Netherlands) A Rus | 6 | 3 | [2]
2 | (Japan) N Hibino (Japan) M Ninomiya | 3 | 6 | [10]

Quarterfinals
1 | (Spain) Y Cavallé Reimers (Italy) A Moratelli | 2 | 2
(Czech Republic) J Malečková (Czech Republic) M Škoch | 6 | 6
4 | A Anshba; E Pridankina | 6 | 6
(United Kingdom) F Jones (United Kingdom) T Moore | 3 | 2
(Poland) M Chwalińska (Czech Republic) A Dețiuc | 6 | 6
(Germany) E Seidel (Switzerland) J Teichmann | 1 | 3
(Colombia) E Arango (Argentina) J Riera | 4 | 4
2 | (Japan) N Hibino (Japan) M Ninomiya | 6 | 6

Semifinals
(Czech Republic) J Malečková (Czech Republic) M Škoch | 7^{7} | 5 | [10]
4 | A Anshba; E Pridankina | 6^{4} | 7 | [8]
(Poland) M Chwalińska (Czech Republic) A Dețiuc | 5 | 7 | [10]
2 | (Japan) N Hibino (Japan) M Ninomiya | 7 | 5 | [8]

Final
(Czech Republic) J Malečková (Czech Republic) M Škoch | 6 | 3 | [2]
(Poland) M Chwalińska (Czech Republic) A Dețiuc | 4 | 6 | [10]
