= 2025 Antalya Challenger 2 =

- Date: 25–30 March
- Edition: 3rd
- Category: WTA 125
- Draw: 32S/16D
- Surface: Clay
- Location: Antalya, Turkey

Champions

Singles
- (Serbia) Olga Danilović

Doubles
- (Argentina) María Lourdes Carlé / (Switzerland) Simona Waltert
- Antalya Challenger

The 2025 Antalya Challenger 2 (also known as the Megasaray Hotels Open 2 for sponsorship reasons) was a professional women's tennis tournament played on outdoor clay courts. It was the third edition of the tournament and the second in a series of three WTA 125 tournaments played at the same venue in consecutive weeks in 2025. It took place at the Megasaray Tennis Academy in Antalya, Turkey between 25 and 30 March 2025.

== Singles main-draw entrants ==
=== Seeds ===
Country	Player	Rank^{1}	Seed
SRB	Olga Danilović	41	1
ESP	Jessica Bouzas Maneiro	58	2
	Kamilla Rakhimova	77	3
SUI	Jil Teichmann	96	4
ARG	María Lourdes Carlé	97	5
~~ROU~~	~~Anca Todoni~~	~~100~~	~~6~~
CRO	Petra Martić	112	7
CHN	Wei Sijia	117	8

- ^{1} Rankings as of 17 March 2025.

=== Other entrants ===
The following players received wildcards into the singles main draw:

- (Turkey) Çağla Büyükakçay
- Anastasiia Gureva
- (Latvia) Adelina Lachinova
- (Turkey) İpek Öz

The following players received entry from the qualifying draw:

- (Austria) Sinja Kraus
- (Germany) Noma Noha Akugue
- Elena Pridankina
- Tatiana Prozorova

The following player received entry as a lucky loser:

- (Slovenia) Tamara Zidanšek

=== Withdrawals ===
Before the tournament

- (Romania) Anca Todoni → replaced by (Slovenia) Tamara Zidanšek

=== Retirements ===
During the tournament

- (Czech Republic) Sára Bejlek (abdominal injury)
- (Croatia) Jana Fett (right arm injury)
- (China) Wei Sijia (abdominal injury)

== Doubles main-draw entrants ==
=== Seeds ===
Country	Player	Country	Player	Rank^{1}	Seed
ESP	Yvonne Cavallé Reimers	ITA	Angelica Moratelli	146	1
JPN	Nao Hibino	JPN	Makoto Ninomiya	163	2
BEL	Magali Kempen	GBR	Maia Lumsden	172	3
	Amina Anshba		Elena Pridankina	184	4

- Rankings are as of 17 March 2025

=== Other entrants ===
The following pair received a wildcard into the doubles main draw:

- (Turkey) Ayla Aksu / (Turkey) İpek Öz

== Champions ==
=== Singles ===
- (Serbia) Olga Danilović def. (Andorra) Victoria Jiménez Kasintseva 6–2, 6–3

=== Doubles ===
- (Argentina) María Lourdes Carlé / (Switzerland) Simona Waltert def. (Poland) Maja Chwalińska / (Czech Republic) Anastasia Dețiuc 3–6, 7–5, [10–3]
