= 2024 Antalya Challenger – Doubles =

Doubles
- 2024 Antalya Challenger

Final
- Champions: (Italy) Angelica Moratelli (Italy) Camilla Rosatello
- Runners-up: (Hungary) Tímea Babos; Vera Zvonareva
- Score: 6–3, 3–6, [15–13]

Events
Singles	Doubles
Antalya Challenger	· 2025 →

This was the first edition of the tournament.

Angelica Moratelli and Camilla Rosatello won the title, defeating Tímea Babos and Vera Zvonareva in the final, 6–3, 3–6, [15–13].

== Seeds ==
1. (Hungary) Tímea Babos / Vera Zvonareva (final)
2. Lidziya Marozava / (Belgium) Kimberley Zimmermann (first round)
3. (Italy) Angelica Moratelli / (Italy) Camilla Rosatello (champions)
4. (Czech Republic) Miriam Kolodziejová / (Czech Republic) Anna Sisková (quarterfinals)

== Draw ==
=== Key ===
- Q = Qualifier
- WC = Wild card
- LL = Lucky loser
- Alt = Alternate
- SE = Special exempt
- PR = Protected ranking
- ITF = ITF entry
- JE = Junior exempt
- w/o = Walkover
- r = Retired
- d = Defaulted
- SR = Special ranking

=== Draw ===
First round
1	(Hungary) T Babos; V Zvonareva	6	6
(Georgia (country)) N Dzalamidze (Latvia) D Semeņistaja	4	2
(Japan) M Uchijima (Hungary) P Udvardy	6	3	[7]
WC	A Gureva; R Zolotareva	2	6	[10]
4	(Czech Republic) M Kolodziejová (Czech Republic) A Sisková	6	6
A Fomina-Klotz (Croatia) T Würth	3	3
(Poland) K Kawa (Netherlands) B Schoofs	6	7^{7}
A Anshba (Czech Republic) A Dețiuc	1	6^{4}
(France) C Paquet (Romania) E-G Ruse	4	7	[8]
(United Kingdom) A Barnett (United Kingdom) F Christie	6	5	[10]
(Slovenia) V Erjavec (Romania) A Mitu	4	6	[8]
3	(Italy) A Moratelli (Italy) C Rosatello	6	4	[10]
(Germany) N Noha Akugue (Germany) E Seidel	6^{2}	6	[10]
(France) F Ferro (France) E Jacquemot	7^{7}	3	[6]
(Thailand) L Kumkhum (Thailand) P Plipuech	6	6
2	L Marozava (Belgium) K Zimmermann	4	2

Quarterfinals
1	(Hungary) T Babos; V Zvonareva	6	6
WC	A Gureva; R Zolotareva	0	1
4	(Czech Republic) M Kolodziejová (Czech Republic) A Sisková	0	4
(Poland) K Kawa (Netherlands) B Schoofs	6	6
(United Kingdom) A Barnett (United Kingdom) F Christie	3	3
3	(Italy) A Moratelli (Italy) C Rosatello	6	6
(Germany) N Noha Akugue (Germany) E Seidel
(Thailand) L Kumkhum (Thailand) P Plipuech	w/o

Semifinals
1	(Hungary) T Babos; V Zvonareva	6	2	[10]
(Poland) K Kawa (Netherlands) B Schoofs	2	6	[6]
3	(Italy) A Moratelli (Italy) C Rosatello	7^{7}	6
(Thailand) L Kumkhum (Thailand) P Plipuech	6^{5}	3

Final
1	(Hungary) T Babos; V Zvonareva	3	6	[13]
3	(Italy) A Moratelli (Italy) C Rosatello	6	3	[15]
