= 2024 Antalya Challenger – Singles =

Singles
- 2024 Antalya Challenger

Final
- Champion: (Spain) Jéssica Bouzas Maneiro
- Runner-up: (Romania) Irina-Camelia Begu
- Score: 6–2, 4–6, 6–2

Events
| Singles | Doubles |
- Antalya Challenger

This was the first edition of the tournament.

Jéssica Bouzas Maneiro won the title, defeating Irina-Camelia Begu in the final, 6–2, 4–6, 6–2.

== Seeds ==
1. (Belgium) Greet Minnen (withdrew)
2. (Latvia) Darja Semeņistaja (second round)
3. (Austria) Julia Grabher (first round)
4. (Romania) Irina-Camelia Begu (final)
5. (Spain) Jéssica Bouzas Maneiro (champion)
6. (Czech Republic) Sára Bejlek (first round)
7. (Serbia) Olga Danilović (quarterfinals)
8. (France) Fiona Ferro (first round)
9. (Hungary) Dalma Gálfi (first round)

== Draw ==
Key

- Q = Qualifier
- WC = Wild card
- LL = Lucky loser
- Alt = Alternate
- ITF = ITF entry
- PR = Protected ranking
- SR = Special ranking
- SE = Special exempt
- JE = Junior exempt
- JR = Junior Accelerator Programme entrant
- CO = College Accelerator Programme entrant
- NG = Next Gen Accelerator Program entrant
- w/o = Walkover
- r = Retired
- d = Defaulted

=== Finals ===
Semifinals
(Switzerland) Simona Waltert | 2 | 3
5 | (Spain) Jéssica Bouzas Maneiro | 6 | 6
4 | (Romania) Irina-Camelia Begu | 7 | 6
(Japan) Moyuka Uchijima | 5 | 2

Final
5 | (Spain) Jéssica Bouzas Maneiro | 6 | 4 | 6
4 | (Romania) Irina-Camelia Begu | 2 | 6 | 2

=== Top half ===
First round
9 | (Hungary) D Gálfi | 4 | 3
(Switzerland) S Waltert | 6 | 6
(France) E Jacquemot | 1 | 6 | 6
(France) C Paquet | 6 | 3 | 1
Q | (Poland) K Kawa | 3 | 7^{8} | 6
Q | (Romania) E-G Ruse | 6 | 6^{6} | 2
(Germany) E Lys | 2 | 0
7 | (Serbia) O Danilović | 6 | 6
3 | (Austria) J Grabher | 7 | 5 | 2
(Germany) N Noha Akugue | 5 | 7 | 6
WC | A Gureva | 2 | 0
P Kudermetova | 6 | 6
Q | (Spain) L Romero Gormaz | 6 | 7
WC | (Turkey) A Kumru | 0 | 5
(Hungary) P Udvardy | 6 | 3 | 3
5 | (Spain) J Bouzas Maneiro | 2 | 6 | 6

Second round
(Switzerland) S Waltert | 6 | 6
(France) E Jacquemot | 2 | 4
Q | (Poland) K Kawa | 6^{4} | 4
7 | (Serbia) O Danilović | 7^{7} | 6
(Germany) N Noha Akugue | 3 | 0^{r}
P Kudermetova | 6 | 3
Q | (Spain) L Romero Gormaz | 1 | 5
5 | (Spain) J Bouzas Maneiro | 6 | 7

Quarterfinals
(Switzerland) S Waltert | 7^{7} | 6
7 | (Serbia) O Danilović | 6^{4} | 2
P Kudermetova | 6 | 5 | 3
5 | (Spain) J Bouzas Maneiro | 2 | 7 | 6

Semifinals
(Switzerland) S Waltert | 2 | 3
5 | (Spain) J Bouzas Maneiro | 6 | 6

=== Bottom half ===
First round
6 | (Czech Republic) S Bejlek | 6^{5} | 3
PR | (Slovenia) P Hercog | 7^{7} | 6
(Hungary) T Babos | 6 | 7^{7}
WC | (Turkey) İ Öz | 3 | 6^{3}
WC | (Turkey) Ç Büyükakçay | 3 | 1
PR | (Croatia) T Würth | 6 | 6
(Austria) S Kraus | 6^{10} | 1
4 | (Romania) I-C Begu | 7^{12} | 6
8 | (France) F Ferro | 1 | 7^{10} | 2
(Turkey) Z Sönmez | 6 | 6^{8} | 6
(Germany) E Seidel | 6 | 6
(Croatia) J Fett | 1 | 2
Q | (Slovenia) V Erjavec | 5 | 6 | 1
(Japan) M Uchijima | 7 | 4 | 6
LL | (France) C Monnet | 0 | 3
2 | (Latvia) D Semeņistaja | 6 | 6

Second round
PR | (Slovenia) P Hercog | 6 | 7^{7}
(Hungary) T Babos | 1 | 6^{5}
PR | (Croatia) T Würth | 5 | 2
4 | (Romania) I-C Begu | 7 | 6
(Turkey) Z Sönmez | 4 | 6 | 6
(Germany) E Seidel | 6 | 1 | 2
(Japan) M Uchijima | 7^{10} | 6
2 | (Latvia) D Semeņistaja | 6^{8} | 0

Quarterfinals
PR | (Slovenia) P Hercog | 4 | 4
4 | (Romania) I-C Begu | 6 | 6
(Turkey) Z Sönmez | 1 | 1
(Japan) M Uchijima | 6 | 6

Semifinals
4 | (Romania) I-C Begu | 7 | 6
(Japan) M Uchijima | 5 | 2

== Qualifying ==
=== Seeds ===
1. (Romania) Elena-Gabriela Ruse (qualified)
2. (Slovenia) Veronika Erjavec (qualified)
3. (Romania) Miriam Bulgaru (qualifying competition)
4. (Poland) Katarzyna Kawa (qualified)
5. (France) Carole Monnet (qualifying competition, lucky loser)
6. Julia Avdeeva (first round)
7. (Croatia) Tena Lukas (qualifying competition)
8. (Croatia) Lucija Ćirić Bagarić (first round)

=== Qualifiers ===
1. (Romania) Elena-Gabriela Ruse
2. (Slovenia) Veronika Erjavec
3. (Spain) Leyre Romero Gormaz
4. (Poland) Katarzyna Kawa

=== Lucky loser ===
1. (France) Carole Monnet

=== Qualifying draw ===
==== First qualifier ====
First round
1 | (Romania) Elena-Gabriela Ruse | 6 | 5 | 6
(Romania) Andreea Mitu | 2 | 7 | 3
WC | (Turkey) Berfu Cengiz | 6^{2} | 6 | 7
6 | Julia Avdeeva | 7^{7} | 3 | 5

Qualifying competition
1 | (Romania) Elena-Gabriela Ruse | 6 | 7
WC | (Turkey) Berfu Cengiz | 0 | 5

==== Second qualifier ====
First round
2 | (Slovenia) Veronika Erjavec | 6 | 1 | 6
(Romania) Cristina Dinu | 3 | 6 | 2
(Italy) Camilla Rosatello | 6^{0} | 7^{7} | 4
7 | (Croatia) Tena Lukas | 7^{7} | 6^{5} | 6

Qualifying competition
2 | (Slovenia) Veronika Erjavec | 6 | 2 | 6
7 | (Croatia) Tena Lukas | 0 | 6 | 1

==== Third qualifier ====
First round
3 | (Romania) Miriam Bulgaru | 7^{7} | 2 | 7
(Germany) Nastasja Schunk | 6^{4} | 6 | 5
(Spain) Leyre Romero Gormaz | 2 | 6 | 6
8 | (Croatia) Lucija Ćirić Bagarić | 6 | 3 | 3

Qualifying competition
3 | (Romania) Miriam Bulgaru | 4 | 7^{7} | 3
(Spain) Leyre Romero Gormaz | 6 | 6^{1} | 6

==== Fourth qualifier ====
First round
4 | (Poland) Katarzyna Kawa | 6 | 1 | 6
Vera Zvonareva | 3 | 6 | 2
WC | (Turkey) İrem Kurt | 1 | 0
5 | (France) Carole Monnet | 6 | 6

Qualifying competition
4 | (Poland) Katarzyna Kawa | 6 | 6
5 | (France) Carole Monnet | 3 | 1
