= 2025 Antalya Challenger 2 – Doubles =

Doubles
- 2025 Antalya Challenger 2

Final
- Champions: (Argentina) María Lourdes Carlé (Switzerland) Simona Waltert
- Runners-up: (Poland) Maja Chwalińska (Czech Republic) Anastasia Dețiuc
- Score: 3–6, 7–5, [10–3]

Events
Singles	Doubles
← 2025 ·	Antalya Challenger	· 2025 →

María Lourdes Carlé and Simona Waltert won the title, after defeating the defending champions Maja Chwalińska and Anastasia Dețiuc 3–6, 7–5, [10–3] in the final

== Seeds ==
1. (Spain) Yvonne Cavallé Reimers / (Italy) Angelica Moratelli (quarterfinals)
2. (Japan) Nao Hibino / (Japan) Makoto Ninomiya (first round)
3. (Belgium) Magali Kempen / (United Kingdom) Maia Lumsden (first round)
4. Amina Anshba / Elena Pridankina (quarterfinals)

== Draw ==
=== Key ===
- Q = Qualifier
- WC = Wild card
- LL = Lucky loser
- Alt = Alternate
- SE = Special exempt
- PR = Protected ranking
- ITF = ITF entry
- JE = Junior exempt
- w/o = Walkover
- r = Retired
- d = Defaulted
- SR = Special ranking

=== Draw ===
First round
1	(Spain) Y Cavallé Reimers (Italy) A Moratelli	6	4	[10]
(China) X Gao (France) E Jacquemot	4	6	[3]
(Poland) M Chwalińska (Czech Republic) A Dețiuc	6	6
(Czech Republic) J Malečková (Czech Republic) M Škoch	4	4
3	(Belgium) M Kempen (United Kingdom) M Lumsden	2	2
(India) P Thombare (China) W Zheng	6	6
(Hungary) D Gálfi; K Rakhimova	7^{7}	6
(United Kingdom) T Moore (Thailand) P Plipuech	6^{5}	2
(Netherlands) I Haverlag (Switzerland) C Naef	5	1
WC	(Turkey) A Aksu (Turkey) İ Öz	7	6
(United Kingdom) E Silva (Belgium) K Zimmermann	3	0
4	A Anshba; E Pridankina	6	6
(Latvia) D Semeņistaja (Hungary) P Udvardy	3	1
(Slovenia) V Erjavec (Spain) L Romero Gormaz	6	6
(Argentina) ML Carlé (Switzerland) S Waltert	7	4	[10]
2	(Japan) N Hibino (Japan) M Ninomiya	5	6	[6]

Quarterfinals
1	(Spain) Y Cavallé Reimers (Italy) A Moratelli	4	4
(Poland) M Chwalińska (Czech Republic) A Dețiuc	6	6
(India) P Thombare (China) W Zheng	7^{8}	6
(Hungary) D Gálfi; K Rakhimova	6^{6}	1
WC	(Turkey) A Aksu (Turkey) İ Öz	6	6^{5}	[12]
4	A Anshba; E Pridankina	4	7^{7}	[10]
(Slovenia) V Erjavec (Spain) L Romero Gormaz	6	6^{7}	[6]
(Argentina) ML Carlé (Switzerland) S Waltert	4	7^{9}	[10]

Semifinals
(Poland) M Chwalińska (Czech Republic) A Dețiuc	6	6
(India) P Thombare (China) W Zheng	1	4
WC	(Turkey) A Aksu (Turkey) İ Öz	6^{5}	6^{1}
(Argentina) ML Carlé (Switzerland) S Waltert	7^{7}	7^{7}

Final
(Poland) M Chwalińska (Czech Republic) A Dețiuc	6	5	[3]
(Argentina) ML Carlé (Switzerland) S Waltert	3	7	[10]
