= 2025 Antalya Challenger 2 – Singles =

Singles
- 2025 Antalya Challenger 2

Final
- Champion: (Serbia) Olga Danilović
- Runner-up: (Andorra) Victoria Jiménez Kasintseva
- Score: 6–2, 6–3

Events
Singles	Doubles
- Antalya Challenger

Olga Danilović won the singles title at the 2025 Antalya Challenger 2, defeating Victoria Jiménez Kasintseva in the final, 6–2, 6–3.

Anca Todoni was the defending champion, but withdrew before her first-round match due to a knee injury.

== Seeds ==
1. (Serbia) Olga Danilović (champion)
2. (Spain) Jessica Bouzas Maneiro (quarterfinals)
3. Kamilla Rakhimova (second round)
4. (Switzerland) Jil Teichmann (first round)
5. (Argentina) María Lourdes Carlé (quarterfinals)
6. (Romania) Anca Todoni (withdrew)
7. (Croatia) Petra Martić (first round)
8. (China) Wei Sijia (first round, retired)

== Draw ==
Key

- Q = Qualifier
- WC = Wild card
- LL = Lucky loser
- Alt = Alternate
- ITF = ITF entry
- PR = Protected ranking
- SR = Special ranking
- SE = Special exempt
- JE = Junior exempt
- JR = Junior Accelerator Programme entrant
- CO = College Accelerator Programme entrant
- NG = Next Gen Accelerator Program entrant
- w/o = Walkover
- r = Retired
- d = Defaulted

=== Finals ===
Semifinals
1	(Serbia) Olga Danilović	6	6
Oksana Selekhmeteva	0	2
(Slovenia) Veronika Erjavec	4	3
(Andorra) Victoria Jiménez Kasintseva	6	6

Final
1	(Serbia) Olga Danilović	6	6
(Andorra) Victoria Jiménez Kasintseva	2	3

=== Top half ===
First round
1	(Serbia) O Danilović	6	6
WC	(Latvia) A Lachinova	1	3
(Croatia) J Fett	6	6
WC	A Gureva	1	1
Q	T Prozorova	3	1
(Switzerland) S Waltert	6	6
(Czech Republic) S Bejlek	6	6
7	(Croatia) P Martić	3	2
3	K Rakhimova	7	6
(Poland) M Chwalińska	5	4
Q	(Germany) N Noha Akugue	4	5
O Selekhmeteva	6	7
(Hungary) D Gálfi	6	7
(France) E Jacquemot	0	5
(Latvia) D Semeņistaja	6^{2}	2
LL	(Slovenia) T Zidanšek	7^{7}	6

Second round
1	(Serbia) O Danilović	6	0
(Croatia) J Fett	0	0^{r}
(Switzerland) S Waltert	4	2
(Czech Republic) S Bejlek	6	0^{r}
3	K Rakhimova	3	6	0
O Selekhmeteva	6	3	6
(Hungary) D Gálfi	4	4
LL	(Slovenia) T Zidanšek	6	6

Quarterfinals
1	(Serbia) O Danilović	6	6
(Switzerland) S Waltert	2	2
O Selekhmeteva	7	6
LL	(Slovenia) T Zidanšek	5	3

Semifinals
1	(Serbia) O Danilović	6	6
O Selekhmeteva	0	2

=== Bottom half ===
First round
5	(Argentina) ML Carlé	2	6	7
(Spain) L Romero Gormaz	6	4	5
WC	(Turkey) İ Öz	7	3	4
(Romania) A Bogdan	5	6	6
(China) X Gao	6	6
(Switzerland) C Naef	0	1
(Slovenia) V Erjavec	6	6
4	(Switzerland) J Teichmann	2	4
8	(China) S Wei	1^{r}
Q	(Austria) S Kraus	4
(Andorra) V Jiménez Kasintseva	6	6
WC	(Turkey) Ç Büyükakçay	3	3
Q	E Pridankina	2	6	6
(Germany) E Seidel	6	1	4
(Hungary) P Udvardy	3	6	4
2	(Spain) J Bouzas Maneiro	6	3	6

Second round
5	(Argentina) ML Carlé	6	6
(Romania) A Bogdan	2	3
(China) X Gao	5	6^{5}
(Slovenia) V Erjavec	7	7^{7}
Q	(Austria) S Kraus	0	6	6^{4}
(Andorra) V Jiménez Kasintseva	6	0	7^{7}
Q	E Pridankina	6	4	3
2	(Spain) J Bouzas Maneiro	2	6	6

Quarterfinals
5	(Argentina) ML Carlé	6	6^{8}	2
(Slovenia) V Erjavec	1	7^{10}	6
(Andorra) V Jiménez Kasintseva	6	7
2	(Spain) J Bouzas Maneiro	4	5

Semifinals
(Slovenia) V Erjavec	4	3
(Andorra) V Jiménez Kasinsteva	6	6

== Qualifying ==
=== Seeds ===
1. (Hungary) Dalma Galfi (moved to main draw)
2. (Austria) Sinja Kraus (qualified)
3. (Switzerland) Céline Naef (moved to main draw)
4. (Slovenia) Tamara Zidanšek (qualifying competition, lucky loser)
5. Tatiana Prozorova (qualified)
6. Elena Pridankina (qualified)
7. (Japan) Nao Hibino (qualifying competition)
8. (Germany) Noma Noha Akugue (qualified)

=== Qualifiers ===
1. (Germany) Noma Noha Akugue
2. (Austria) Sinja Kraus
3. Elena Pridankina
4. Tatiana Prozorova

=== Lucky loser ===
1. (Slovenia) Tamara Zidanšek

=== Qualifying draw ===
==== First qualifier ====
First round
Alt	(Japan) Makoto Ninomiya	1	7^{7}	6
Daria Lodikova	6	6^{5}	3
Ekaterina Ovcharenko	1	4
8	(Germany) Noma Noha Akugue	6	6

Qualifying competition
Alt	(Japan) Makoto Ninomiya	0	2
8	(Germany) Noma Noha Akugue	6	6

==== Second qualifier ====
First round
2	(Austria) Sinja Kraus	6	6
(Czech Republic) Jesika Malečková	2	2
WC	(Turkey) İrem Kurt	0	0
7	(Japan) Nao Hibino	6	6

Qualifying competition
2	(Austria) Sinja Kraus	6	6
7	(Japan) Nao Hibino	3	4

==== Third qualifier ====
First round
Alt	(United Kingdom) Tara Moore	7^{10}	2	4
WC	Vlada Guryleva	6^{8}	6	6
(Turkey) Ayla Aksu	4	5
6	Elena Pridankina	6	7

Qualifying competition
WC	Vlada Guryleva	1	3
6	Elena Pridankina	6	6

==== Fourth qualifier ====
First round
4	(Slovenia) Tamara Zidanšek	6	7^{7}
(Italy) Verena Meliss	4	6^{4}
(China) Zheng Wushuang	7	3	2
5	Tatiana Prozorova	5	6	6

Qualifying competition
4	(Slovenia) Tamara Zidanšek	2	1
5	Tatiana Prozorova	6	6
