= Valeriya Pogrebnyak =

Russian tennis player

Valeriya Pogrebnyak Валерия Погребняк
- Full name: Valeriya Romanovna Pogrebnyak
- Country (sports): Russia
- Born: 25 August 1998 (age 26)
- Plays: Left-handed
- Prize money: US$ 22,057

Singles
- Career record: 43–92
- Career titles: 0
- Highest ranking: No. 885 (10 October 2016)

Doubles
- Career record: 47–64
- Career titles: 1 ITF
- Highest ranking: No. 638 (31 August 2015)
- Last updated on: 26 August 2020.

Valeriya Romanovna Pogrebnyak (Russian: Валерия Романовна Погребняк; born 25 August 1998) is an inactive Russian tennis player.

Pogrebnyak has a career high WTA singles ranking of 885 achieved on 10 October 2016. She also has a career high WTA doubles ranking of 638 achieved on 31 August 2015.

Pogrebnyak made her WTA main draw debut at the 2018 St. Petersburg Ladies' Trophy in the doubles draw partnering Elena Rybakina.

== ITF Circuit finals ==
=== Doubles: 1 (1 title) ===
Legend $100,000 tournaments $80,000 tournaments $60,000 tournaments $25,000 tournaments $10,000 tournaments	Finals by surface Hard (0–0) Clay (1–0) Grass (0–0) Carpet (0–0)

Result	No.	Date	Tournament	Surface	Partner	Opponents	Score
Win	1	Apr 2018	ITF Shymkent, Kazakhstan	Clay	(Russia) Daria Kruzhkova	(India) Kyra Shroff (India) Pranjala Yadlapalli	6–3, 5–7, [10–5]
