= 2025 Antalya Challenger 1 =

- Date: 17–23 March
- Edition: 2nd
- Category: WTA 125
- Draw: 32S/16D
- Surface: Clay
- Location: Antalya, Turkey

Champions

Singles
- (Romania) Anca Todoni

Doubles
- (Poland) Maja Chwalińska / (Czech Republic) Anastasia Dețiuc
- Antalya Challenger

The 2025 Antalya Challenger 1 (also known as the Megasaray Hotels Open 1 for sponsorship reasons) was a professional women's tennis tournament played on outdoor clay courts. It was the second edition of the tournament and the first in a series of three WTA 125 tournaments played at the same venue in consecutive weeks in 2025. It took place at the Megasaray Tennis Academy in Antalya, Turkey between 17 and 23 March 2025.

== Singles main-draw entrants ==
=== Seeds ===
Country	Player	Rank^{1}	Seed
COL	Emiliana Arango	80	1
FRA	Diane Parry	90	2
NED	Arantxa Rus	92	3
SUI	Jil Teichmann	98	4
ARG	María Lourdes Carlé	103	5
ROU	Anca Todoni	105	6
ESP	Nuria Párrizas Díaz	106	7
CHN	Wei Sijia	117	8

- ^{1} Rankings as of 3 March 2025.

=== Other entrants ===
The following players received wildcards into the singles main draw:

- (Turkey) Ayla Aksu
- (Turkey) Çağla Büyükakçay
- (Turkey) Deniz Dilek
- (Turkey) Ada Kumru

The following player received entry into the main draw with a protected ranking:

- (Montenegro) Danka Kovinić

The following players received entry from the qualifying draw:

- (Germany) Noma Noha Akugue
- Elena Pridankina
- (France) Margaux Rouvroy
- (Slovenia) Tamara Zidanšek

=== Retirements ===
During the tournament

- (France) Clara Burel (lower back issues)

== Doubles main-draw entrants ==
=== Seeds ===
Country	Player	Country	Player	Rank^{1}	Seed
ESP	Yvonne Cavallé Reimers	ITA	Angelica Moratelli	144	1
JPN	Nao Hibino	JPN	Makoto Ninomiya	160	2
BEL	Magali Kempen	GBR	Maia Lumsden	178	3
	Amina Anshba		Elena Pridankina	188	4

- Rankings are as of 3 March 2025

=== Other entrants ===
The following pair received a wildcard into the doubles main draw:

- (Turkey) Deniz Dilek / (Turkey) Ada Kumru

== Champions ==
=== Singles ===
- (Romania) Anca Todoni def. (Spain) Leyre Romero Gormaz, 6–3, 6–2

=== Doubles ===
- (Poland) Maja Chwalińska / (Czech Republic) Anastasia Dețiuc def. (Czech Republic) Jesika Malečková / (Czech Republic) Miriam Škoch 4–6, 6–3, [10–2]
