= Vera Zvonareva =

Russian tennis player (born 1984)

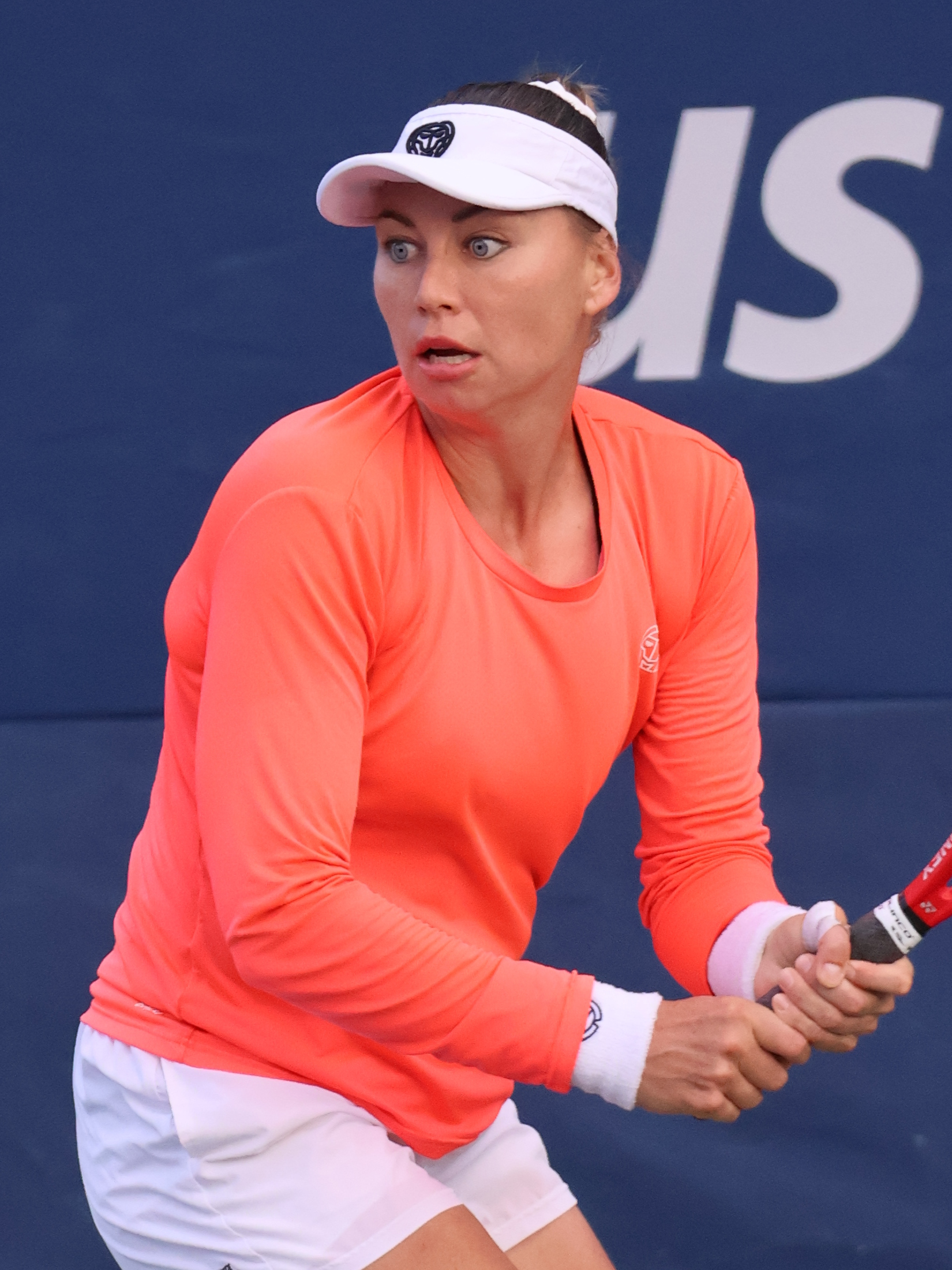
- Zvonareva at the 2023 US Open
- Full name: Vera Igorevna Zvonareva
- Native name: Вера Игоревна Звонарёва
- Country (sports): Russia
- Residence: Moscow, Russia
- Born: 7 September 1984 (age 42) Moscow, Russian SFSR, Soviet Union
- Height: 1.72 m (5 ft 8 in)
- Turned pro: September 2000
- Plays: Right-handed (two-handed backhand)
- Prize money: US$ 16,995,231: 37th in all-time rankings

Singles
- Career record: 613–336
- Career titles: 12
- Highest ranking: No. 2 (25 October 2010)
- Current ranking: No. 292 (24 August 2026)

Grand Slam singles results
- Australian Open: SF (2009, 2011)
- French Open: QF (2003)
- Wimbledon: F (2010)
- US Open: F (2010)

Other tournaments
- Tour Finals: F (2008)

Doubles
- Career record: 347–207
- Career titles: 16
- Highest ranking: No. 7 (19 February 2024)
- Current ranking: No. 17 (24 August 2026)

Grand Slam doubles results
- Australian Open: W (2012)
- French Open: QF (2006, 2024, 2026)
- Wimbledon: F (2010)
- US Open: W (2006, 2020)

Other doubles tournaments
- Tour Finals: W (2023)

Mixed doubles
- Career titles: 2

Grand Slam mixed doubles results
- Australian Open: QF (2005, 2006)
- French Open: SF (2006)
- Wimbledon: W (2006)
- US Open: W (2004)

Team competitions
- Fed Cup: W (2004, 2008), record 8–2
Medal record
Olympic Games
Bronze medal – third place	2008 Beijing	Singles
- Last updated on: 20 July 2026.

Vera Igorevna Zvonareva (Note: Also transliterated as Zvonaryova.) (Russian: Вера Игоревна Звонарёва, IPA: [ˈvʲerə ˈiɡərʲɪvnə zvənɐˈrʲɵvə]; born 7 September 1984) is a Russian professional tennis player. Her career-high singles ranking is world No. 2, and No. 7 in doubles by the WTA. Zvonareva has won twelve singles titles, including the 2009 Indian Wells Open, and reached the finals of the 2008 WTA Tour Championships, 2010 Wimbledon Championships, and 2010 US Open. She was also a bronze medalist at the 2008 Beijing Olympics.

In doubles, Zvonareva has won five major titles. Three came in women's doubles, first at the 2006 US Open, partnering Nathalie Dechy, and the 2012 Australian Open, with Svetlana Kuznetsova. Following her return to tennis, Zvonareva won her third women's doubles major title at the 2020 US Open, partnering Laura Siegemund. Her other two major titles came in mixed doubles, the first at the 2004 US Open with Bob Bryan, and her second at the 2006 Wimbledon Championships, with Andy Ram. She also won the doubles title at the 2023 WTA Finals partnering Siegemund.

== Early life ==
Zvonareva was born in 1984 in Moscow to Igor Zvonarev and Natalia Bykova. Igor played Bandy in the USSR championship with Dynamo Moscow, and Nataliya played field hockey and was the bronze medalist at the 1980 Moscow Olympic Games. Zvonareva was introduced to tennis at age six by her mother.

== Career ==
=== 1999–2002: Early career, ITF titles and top 50 ===
Zvonareva started to compete on the ITF Women's Circuit in 1999, debuting at a tournament in Tbilisi, Georgia. She won three qualifying matches there to reach the main draw before losing in the first round.

The following year 2000, she turned professional and won an ITF event in Moscow, without dropping a set, despite being unranked. The event was just the second event she had played in her professional career. Five weeks later, she made her WTA-level debut at the Tier I tournament in Moscow, beating world No. 148, Elena Bovina, before losing to world No. 11, Anna Kournikova, in the second round. In 2001, she failed to qualify for WTA Tour events in Key Biscayne and Moscow, but reached a semifinal at the ITF tournament in Civitanova, Italy. During this time, she won the Orange Bowl Under-18s event in 2000 and 2001.

In 2002, Zvonareva won her second ITF title in Naples, Florida and in July reached her first singles final on the WTA Tour at Palermo, losing to Mariana Díaz Oliva, in three sets. She also achieved semifinal finishes in Warsaw and Sopot, plus a quarterfinal finish in Bol, Croatia. Zvonareva won three qualifying matches at the French Open to reach the main draw for the first time at a Grand Slam tournament. She lost there in the fourth round to eventual champion, Serena Williams, in three sets. Her ranking was high enough for a direct entry into the Wimbledon Championships, where she lost in the second round to the 23rd seed Iva Majoli. At the US Open, Zvonareva lost to world No. 7, Kim Clijsters, in the third round. Her ranking rose into the top 100 after the French Open and into the top 50 after the US Open.

=== 2003–2004: Major singles quarterfinal & doubles title, top 10 ===
In 2003, Zvonareva won the title at the Tier-III event in Bol, beating Conchita Martínez Granados in the final, and reached three other semifinals (including the Tier-II event in Linz). She defeated a top-10 player for the first time when she beat world No. 10, Anastasia Myskina, in Berlin. At the French Open, Zvonareva defeated world No. 3, Venus Williams, in the fourth round, before losing in the quarterfinals to world No. 76, Nadia Petrova. Her French Open results caused her ranking to enter the top 20. She reached the quarterfinals in six out of the seven Tier I events she contested. Her debut for Russia in Fed Cup was in the World Group quarterfinals against Slovenia. Russia won 5–0, but lost to France 2–3 in the semifinals. In doubles, she reached her first WTA Tour final at Moscow with Myskina. She ended the year ranked No. 13.

In 2004, Zvonareva won her first career Grand Slam title, winning the mixed doubles competition at the US Open with Bob Bryan. She won one singles title, in Memphis and reached the final of the events in Cincinnati and Philadelphia, losing to top-10 players Lindsay Davenport and Amélie Mauresmo. In the final of the Memphis event, Zvonareva trailed hometown favorite Lisa Raymond 5–2 in the third set, before saving three match points and winning the last five games of the match to win the title. In addition to this, she reached the semifinals of three Tier-I tournaments in Rome, San Diego, and Montreal. She lost in San Diego to fellow Russian Anastasia Myskina in a match that featured a final set tiebreak that ended 17–15. Zvonareva and Myskina teamed in the final of the Fed Cup, playing in the crucial final rubber against Marion Bartoli and Émilie Loit, which the pair won, 7–6, 7–5, to seal Russia's first Fed Cup title.

Zvonareva ended 2004 the year ranked world No. 11. In August, she reached her then-career high of world No. 9. Because of several withdrawals, Zvonareva was able to compete at the WTA Championships, an event reserved for the top eight players in the world. She was unable to win a match and exited at the round-robin stage.

=== 2005: First injury ===
Zvonareva obtained an invitation from the Hong Kong Tennis Patrons' Association to play in the Watsons Water Champions Challenge. She defended her Memphis title, defeating Meghann Shaughnessy but she was injured in the second half of 2005. Her ranking dropped from No. 11 to 42.

=== 2006: Two major doubles titles ===
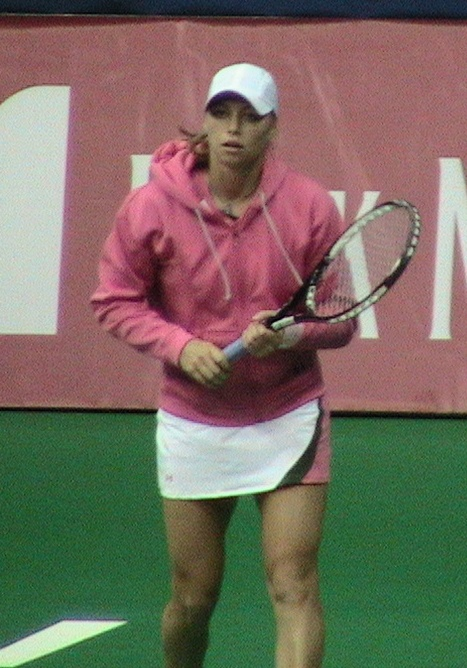
Zvonareva at 2006 Kremlin Cup

In 2006, Zvonareva won her first women's doubles major tournament at the US Open, partnering Nathalie Dechy of France. She won a second mixed doubles title at Wimbledon, partnering Andy Ram of Israel. They defeated Bob Bryan and Venus Williams, in straight sets. She garnered some success in singles competition, winning two titles in a season for the first time in her career. This included her first tournament win on grass, at the Birmingham Classic in England. Her other title came in Cincinnati, where she played a nearly flawless match against Serena Williams in the semifinals, and beat Katarina Srebotnik in the final.

=== 2007: Second injury ===
The 2007 season was a year of mixed fortune for Zvonareva. At Indian Wells, she stunned world No. 1, Maria Sharapova, who was the defending champion, in three sets in the fourth round, marking her first victory over a reigning world No. 1. However, she fell in the next round to Li Na. At her next tournament, the Charleston Open, she retired when playing Dinara Safina and down a set, due to a left wrist injury. This injury kept her out of the European clay-court season, the grass-court season, and most of the North American hard-court season. On returning to the tour, she reached the third round of the US Open, losing to Serena Williams. At the remaining tournaments on her schedule, she reached the quarterfinals or better at four out of five, with semifinal finishes in Luxembourg and Quebec. Her one final came during the first week of the year, in Auckland, New Zealand.

=== 2008: Back to top 10, Olympic bronze, WTA Finals finalist ===
Zvonareva began the year by losing to wildcard Marina Erakovic, then ranked world No. 153, at Auckland, and then reached the final of the Hobart International. She did not play the final against Eleni Daniilidou because of an ankle injury, and this injury also forced her to retire in her first-round match at the Australian Open against Ai Sugiyama, trailing 3–6, 1–1.

She then reached the final of the Tier I Qatar Open in Doha, beating Dinara Safina, Sybille Bammer, and Li Na along the way. In the final against world No. 5 and fourth-seeded Maria Sharapova, Zvonareva lost in three sets. In March, at the Bangalore Open, Zvonareva lost in the quarterfinals to Venus Williams. Zvonareva then reached the quarterfinals of the Tier I Pacific Life Open in Indian Wells, before losing to eventual champion Ana Ivanovic, 1–6, 4–6. Two weeks later, Zvonareva reached the semifinals of the Tier I Miami Open in Key Biscayne, where she lost to fourth seed Jelena Janković, 1–6, 4–6.

On clay, Zvonareva then reached her third final overall and second Tier I final of the year at the Charleston Cup. En route to the final, she defeated world No. 5, Jelena Janković, and world No. 8, Elena Dementieva, the first time in her career that she beat two top-10 players in the same tournament. In the final, she lost to fifth seed Serena Williams in three sets. In May, Zvonareva won her first WTA title in nearly two years. At the Tier IV ECM Prague Open, Zvonareva defeated third seed Victoria Azarenka in the final. This was her sixth career singles title. She then lost to Venus Williams in the third round of the Tier I Italian Open, and to Dementieva in the fourth round of the French Open.

On grass court, Zvonareva lost her first match at the Eastbourne International and her second-round match against Tamarine Tanasugarn at Wimbledon.

During the North American summer hard-court season, commonly known as the US Open Series, she lost in the first round of the Stanford Classic, the second round of the L.A. Championships, and the first round of the Tier I Rogers Cup in Montreal. At the Beijing Olympics, Zvonareva lost in the semifinals to fifth seeded Dementieva, 4–6, 6–7, but then defeated Li Na to win the bronze medal. With these results Zvonareva's ranking rose to a career-high-equaling world No. 9. Two weeks later, Zvonareva was seeded eighth at the US Open, but lost in the second round to Tatiana Perebiynis of Ukraine, 3–6, 3–6.

In September, Zvonareva helped Russia to victory against Spain in the final of the Fed Cup. Zvonareva won the opening match of the tie in Madrid, defeating Anabel Medina Garrigues, in straight sets. At the Guangzhou International Open, a Tier III event, she defeated Zheng Jie in straight sets in the semifinals, before beating Peng Shuai in the final. She then reached the semifinals at the China Open in Beijing, losing a three-set match to top-seeded Janković. At the Tier II Porsche Tennis Grand Prix in Stuttgart, Zvonareva lost in the quarterfinals, again to Janković, 6–7, 6–7. In her hometown event, the Kremlin Cup in Moscow the next week, Zvonareva beat second seed Dinara Safina in straight sets in the semifinals, but lost to Janković for the third time in three weeks in the final in straight sets. In a second-round match against Medina Garrigues at the Zurich Open, Zvonareva retired from the match while trailing 3–6, 0–3. However, she then reached the final of the Linz Open in Austria, beating Marion Bartoli in the semifinals, 6–0, 6–1, before losing the final to Ivanovic in straight sets, hitting 32 unforced errors.

To finish off the year, Zvonareva qualified for the year-end WTA Finals (open to the top eight players) for the second time in her career. To accrue enough points to qualify, she had played six consecutive tournaments after the US Open. In her first round-robin match, she won against compatriot Svetlana Kuznetsova, 6–2, 6–3. Zvonareva then beat Ivanovic, before completing a clean sweep of her group by defeating world No. 1, Janković, again on three sets. She reached the final by defeating Olympic gold medalist Dementieva, but lost a three-setter to Wimbledon champion Venus Williams.

=== 2009: First major semifinal and Indian Wells champion ===
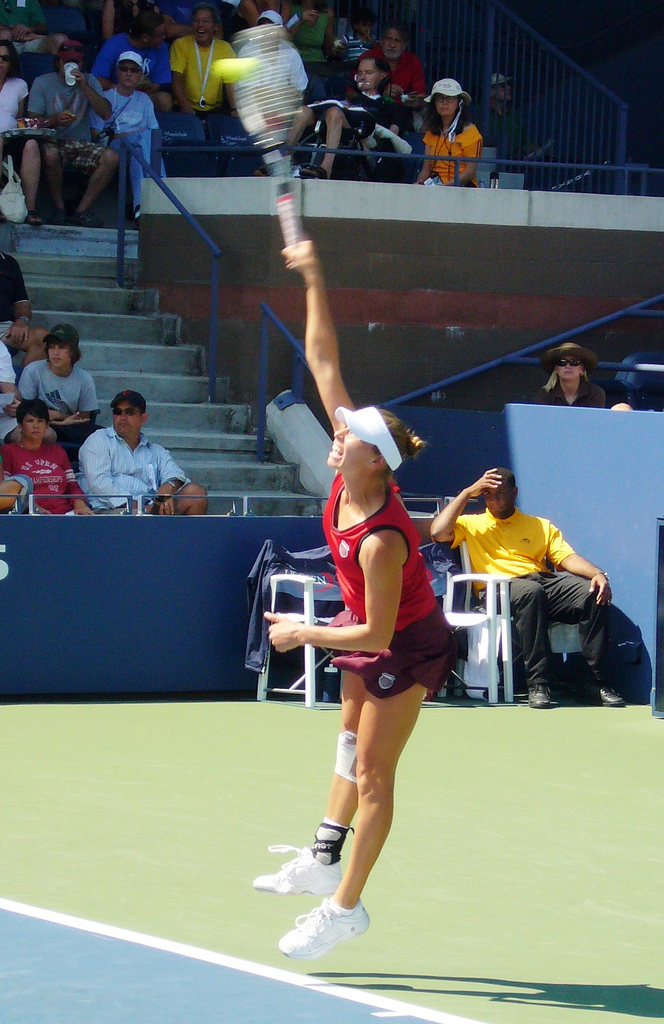
Zvonareva serving at the 2009 US Open

Zvonareva was seventh seed at the Australian Open. She defeated tenth seed Nadia Petrova in the fourth round, and 16th seed Marion Bartoli in the quarterfinals both in straight sets. She then lost to world No. 3, Dinara Safina, in the semifinals. This tournament, however, caused Zvonareva's ranking to rise to world No. 5, the highest of her career at the time.

In February, she won the Pattaya Open in Thailand where she defeated Sania Mirza in the final. She also played the Dubai Championships, a Premier 5 event, where she defeated Marion Bartoli in the third round, before losing to Virginie Razzano in the quarterfinals, 6–7, 5–7.

In March, Zvonareva was the fourth seed at the first Premier Mandatory event of the year, the Indian Wells Open. She won the title, overcoming Santa Ana winds and defending champion Ana Ivanovic in the final. In the doubles final, she and Victoria Azarenka beat unseeded Gisela Dulko and Shahar Pe'er.

At Key Biscayne, at the second Premier Mandatory event of the year, Zvonareva beat Tathiana Garbin of Italy in the second round, before being upset in the third round by Li Na. Zvonereva had beaten Li the previous week in the fourth round of the Indian Wells Open.

At the Family Circle Cup in Charleston, Zvonareva was the third seed and received a first-round bye. She beat Rossana de los Ríos in the second round, 6–3, 6–2. In the third round against Virginie Razzano, she was forced to retire due to an ankle injury. Zvonareva tore two ligaments in her ankle, which later forced her to withdraw from Russia's Fed Cup tie with Italy. The ongoing ankle injury forced her to withdraw from the Italian Open in Rome and the Madrid Open, and ultimately the French Open.

Zvonareva was seeded seventh at the Wimbledon and met Georgie Stoop in the first round. The game was close, being abandoned due to bad light at the end of the first day at one set apiece. Zvonareva went on to win beating Mathilde Johansson, before she withdrew in the third round against the 26th seed, Virginie Razzano, due to a recurrence of the ankle injury.

In the Istanbul Cup, she was upset by Mariya Koryttseva. In her first tournament of the US Open Series, she competed in the L.A. Championships, where she lost in the quarterfinals to eventual champion Flavia Pennetta. She then reached the third rounds of the Cincinnati Open and the Rogers Cup, losing to Daniela Hantuchová and to Maria Sharapova,. She defeated Nuria Llagostera Vives, Anna Chakvetadze, and Elena Vesnina, before missing six match points and crumbling to Flavia Pennetta, 6–3, 6–7, 0–6, at the US Open. She then competed in the Pan Pacific Open, where she lost to compatriot Alisa Kleybanova, in three sets in the second round, after receiving a bye in the first round. She followed it up by competing in the China Open, where she reached the quarterfinals, losing to Marion Bartoli in another three-setter.

Zvonareva competed in the Kremlin Cup in Moscow as the top seed but was defeated in the second round by Tsvetana Pironkova, 6–0, 6–2. Because of her loss, she did not qualify for the Tour Championships in Doha, but did win a spot as an alternate. Due to the withdrawal of Dinara Safina, Zvonareva was set to play two matches there. However, she played only one match and lost to Caroline Wozniacki, 0–6, 7–6, 4–6, in a dramatic match in which both players suffered injuries. She then withdrew from the tournament, citing ankle injury (the last match was played by her co-alternate Agnieszka Radwańska). She finished the year ranked world No. 9.

=== 2010: Wimbledon and US Open finals and world No. 2 ===
Zvonareva obtained an invitation from the Hong Kong Tennis Patrons' Association once again to play in the Hong Kong Tennis Classic and won the championships with her compatriots Maria Sharapova and Yevgeny Kafelnikov. Seeded ninth at the Australian Open, she made it to the fourth round, winning her first three matches against Kristína Kučová, Iveta Benešová, and Gisela Dulko. She eventually lost to Victoria Azarenka in three sets, after leading 6–4, 4–1. Due to this loss, Zvonareva fell out of the top 10. As the top seed and defending champion at the Pattaya Open, she defeated Ksenia Pervak in the first round, Alberta Brianti in the second round, fifth seed Sybille Bammer in the quarterfinals, and fourth seed Yaroslava Shvedova in the semifinals. In the final, she defeated local favorite Tamarine Tanasugarn in straight sets, thereby defending her title. At Dubai, Zvonareva defeated compatriot Elena Vesnina in three sets in the first round, and then following it up with a double bagel against qualifier Kirsten Flipkens. She then defeated Jelena Janković in straight sets to reach the quarterfinals, before she lost to Azarenka, 1–6, 3–6.

Despite being the defending champion at Indian Wells, Zvonareva lost her fourth-round match against Samantha Stosur. With this loss, she fell out of the top 20. At the Miami Open, Zvonareva lost to Justine Henin, 1–6, 4–6, in the fourth round, after defeating Melanie Oudin and Sara Errani in straight sets.

Her next tournament was the Charleston Cup, where she was seventh seed. She beat Melanie Oudin in straight sets, in the quarterfinals. She advanced to her second final of the year and second Family Circle Cup final, after top seed and world No. 2, Caroline Wozniacki retired while trailing 5–2 in the semifinals due to a sprained ankle. Zvonareva was then overwhelmed in the final by Samantha Stosur, 0–6, 3–6.

Zvonareva's next tournament was the Internazionali d'Italia, where, as 15th seed, she lost to Petra Kvitová, 4–6, 0–6, in the second round. At the Madrid Open, she lost to Venus Williams, 5–7, 3–6, in the second round, after defeating Melanie Oudin, in straight sets. Zvonareva was seeded 21st at the French Open. She defeated Alberta Brianti in the first round, but was then upset by Anastasia Rodionova in the second round, in straight sets.

Her next tournament was the Eastbourne International in England, where she lost to María José Martínez Sánchez in three tight sets, in the opening round.

Zvonareva reached her first Grand Slam singles final at Wimbledon, where she was 21st seed. She defeated Nuria Llagostera Vives, Andrea Hlaváčková, 15th seed Yanina Wickmayer, fourth seed Jelena Janković, eighth seed Kim Clijsters, and Tsvetana Pironkova to reach the final, where she fell in straight sets to world No. 1, Serena Williams. Later the same day, she lost the women's doubles final in straight sets as well, playing with Elena Vesnina. Zvonareva rose to world No. 9 in singles following the tournament.

Zvonareva was seeded third at the San Diego Open. She defeated Dominika Cibulková in three sets in the first round, before falling to CoCo Vandeweghe. Seeded sixth at the Cincinnati Open, Zvonareva received a bye into the second round, where she faced compatriot Maria Kirilenko. In a match with several rain interruptions, Zvonareva found herself down 2–5 in the third set before another rain delay. Coming back onto court, Zvonareva rallied to take the third set and the match, 7–5, 2–6, 7–6. She lost to 11th seed Flavia Pennetta in the third round. At the Rogers Cup, Zvonareva had a bye in the first round and beat Yaroslava Shvedova in the second round, Ágnes Szávay in the third round, and Kim Clijsters in the quarterfinals. After two days of rain, Zvonareva returned on Monday, winning her semifinal against Victoria Azarenka, who retired when trailing, 7–6, 1–0. She was then beaten by Caroline Wozniacki in the final.

As the seventh seed, Zvonareva reached her second career and second straight Grand Slam final at the US Open, where she lost to second seed Kim Clijsters, 2–6, 1–6. She had defeated Zuzana Kučová, Sabine Lisicki, 25th seed Alexandra Dulgheru, Andrea Petkovic, 31st seed Kaia Kanepi, and top seed Caroline Wozniacki. Zvonareva attained her then career-high ranking of world No. 2 following the US Open.

Zvonareva's first tournament after the US Open was the Pan Pacific Open, where she was second seed. She advanced to the quarterfinals, before falling to world No. 10 and seventh seeded Elena Dementieva. She then competed in the China Open, rallying from a set down against Kirilenko in the third round, and beating French Open champion Schiavone, 6–2, 6–0, in the quarterfinals. This was her tenth victory over the Italian in ten career meetings. This win ensured that Zvonareva would rise to world No. 3. She then defeated Li Na in the semifinals, before falling to top-seeded Wozniacki in the final, in three sets. Zvonareva qualified for the year-end Tour Championships in Doha, where she was the second seed. She was in the White Group with Kim Clijsters, Jelena Janković, and Victoria Azarenka. Zvonareva went 3–0 in her group and advanced to the semifinals, where she lost to Caroline Wozniacki. She finished the season ranked world No. 2.

=== 2011: Mixed results ===
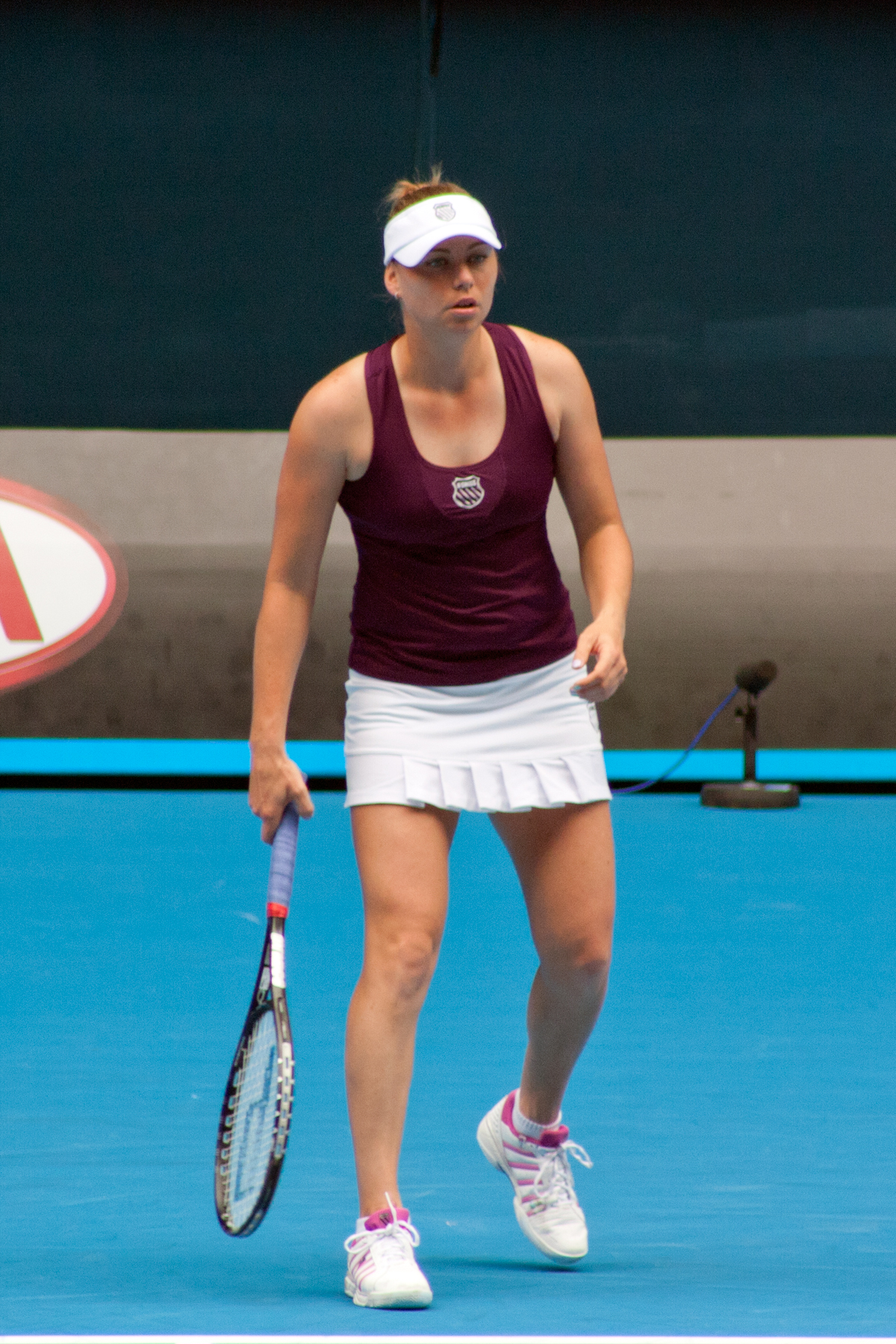
Zvonareva at the 2011 Australian Open

At the Hong Kong Tennis Classic, she joined Russia's group and won in the final against Europe with Maria Kirilenko and Yevgeny Kafelnikov. As the second seed at the Sydney International, Zvonareva received a bye into the second round, where she was defeated by Flavia Pennetta, 7–5, 7–5. Zvonareva was seeded second at the Australian Open in singles. She defeated Sybille Bammer in the first round, breaking Bammer four times in a row, and defeated unseeded Bojana Jovanovski in the second. In the third round, Zvonareva defeated 31st seed Lucie Šafářová in straight sets. She beat unseeded Iveta Benešová in the round of 16, and then 25th seed Petra Kvitová in the quarterfinal. In the semifinal, she was defeated by third seed and eventual champion Kim Clijsters, 6–3, 6–3.

At the Pattaya Open, Zvonareva was the top seed and was seeking her third consecutive title and second title defence. She defeated Tamira Paszek in the first round, qualifier Nungnadda Wannasuk in the second, and Peng Shuai in the quarterfinals. In the semifinals, Zvonareva was upset by fourth seed Daniela Hantuchová, in two sets. As the second seed at the Dubai Tennis Championships, Zvonareva received a bye into the second round. There, she defeated Roberta Vinci, but in the third round, she was upset by 15th seed Alisa Kleybanova, in straight sets.

Zvonareva picked up her first title of 2011 in late February at the Qatar Ladies Open. She was the second seed, receiving a bye into the second round, where she defeated Dominika Cibulková, 6–1, 6–2. In the quarterfinals, she defeated Daniela Hantuchová, in a close match lasting over three hours, after trailing 5–4 in the third set. She defeated former world No. 1, Jelena Janković, 6–1, 2–6, 6–4, in the semifinals, and current world No. 1 and top-seed Caroline Wozniacki, in straight sets in the final. It was Zvonareva's first title in over a year and the third time she had defeated the reigning world No. 1.

Zvonareva was the third seed at the Indian Wells Open and had a bye into the second round. Despite letting a 6–3, 5–1 lead escape her, she defeated Timea Bacsinszky, 6–3, 7–6. In the third round, in a match that lasted over three hours, she was upset by 25th seed Dominika Cibulková, despite saving five match points. Zvonareva was the third seed at the Miami Open with a bye into the second round, where she defeated Dinara Safina, in three sets. In the third round, she faced 28th seed Jarmila Groth, defeating her in straight sets. In the fourth round, she faced the 15th seed Marion Bartoli, prevailing 2–6, 6–3, 6–2. Then in the quarterfinals, Zvonareva faced ninth seed Agnieszka Radwańska, whom she defeated, 7–5, 6–3, to reach the semifinals in Key Biscayne for the second time, the last time being in 2008. Despite winning two of her four previous matches after trailing a set in the tournament, Victoria Azarenka, the eighth seed, dispatched Zvonareva in the semifinals, 6–0, 6–3. Zvonareva led the Russian Fed Cup team in their semifinal tie against Italy. She defeated both Sara Errani and Roberta Vinci in straight sets to ensure a spot for Russia in the final.

Zvonareva kicked off her clay-court season at the Porsche Tennis Grand Prix in Stuttgart. As the second seed, she received a bye into the second round, defeating Anastasia Pavlyuchenkova, before losing to Sam Stosur in the quarterfinals. She was the second seed at the Madrid Open, where she beat Patty Schnyder and Elena Vesnina, before being upset by 16th seed and eventual champion Petra Kvitová in the third round. At the inaugural Brussels Open, after a first round bye, she defeated qualifier Galina Voskoboeva, after dropping the first set in the second round. In the quarterfinals, she blew out world No. 28 and sixth seed Alexandra Dulgheru of Romania, 6–0, 6–1, losing just one point on serve. Her run ended in the semifinals, where she was upset 6–3, 6–3 by eighth seed Peng Shuai. Zvonareva was seeded third at the French Open and defeated unseeded Lourdes Domínguez Lino in the first round, 6–3, 6–3. In the second round, she defeated Sabine Lisicki, 4–6, 7–5, 7–5, despite trailing 5–2 in the third set and having to save a match point. Zvonareva avenged her loss at the previous year's French Open by defeating Anastasia Rodionova in the third round, 6–2, 6–3. In the fourth round, where she was the top remaining seed, Zvonareva came up against the 15th seed Anastasia Pavlyuchenkova. The match showed sporadic form by both women, until Pavlyuchenkova prevailed, 7–6, 2–6, 6–2.

Beginning the grass-court season at Eastbourne as the top seed, Zvonareva defeated Heather Watson, 6–3, 6–3, and Serena Williams, 3–6, 7–6, 7–5, but lost to Samantha Stosur, in three sets in the quarterfinals. Zvonareva was second seed at Wimbledon, defeating Alison Riske, 6–0, 3–6, 6–3, in the first round and Elena Vesnina, 6–1, 7–6, in the second, before falling to Tsvetana Pironkova, in straight sets in a rematch of the previous year's semifinal match. Zvonareva suffered an ankle injury during her singles match and subsequently withdrew from the doubles competition.

Zvonareva's hardcourt summer began at the inaugural Baku Cup, where she was the top seed. Zvonareva defeated Nigina Abduraimova, Kristína Kučová, Anna Tatishvili, and Mariya Koryttseva to reach the final, where she defeated Ksenia Pervak for her 12th WTA Tour title. At the Carlsbad Open in California, she was the top seed and made it to the final, where she lost to Agnieszka Radwańska. By making it to the final, Zvonareva achieved a career-high winning streak of nine matches. Zvonareva then went on to play in the Canadian Open in Toronto, where she was third seed. After receiving a bye into the second round, she defeated Nadia Petrova, before again falling to Agnieszka Radwańska. Despite the early loss compared to her 2010 performance, Zvonareva rose to world No. 2, matching her career-high ranking. At the Cincinnati Open, she was second seed and received a bye into the second round. She defeated Ekaterina Makarova, Petra Martić, and Daniela Hantuchová en route to the semifinals, where she fell to the fourth seed and eventual champion Maria Sharapova, in three sets. At the US Open, Zvonareva was second seed and defeated qualifier Stéphanie Foretz Gacon, Kateryna Bondarenko, 30th seed Anabel Medina Garrigues, and the 22nd seed Sabine Lisicki to reach the quarterfinals, where she lost to ninth seed and eventual champion Samantha Stosur, 6–3, 6–3. Unable to defend her runner-up points from 2010, she fell to world No. 4.

Zvonareva began her Asian hard-court swing at the Pan Pacific Open in Tokyo, where she was the fourth seed and received a bye into the second round, then defeating Tsvetana Pironkova, Iveta Benešová, Maria Kirilenko, and Petra Kvitová—all in straight sets to progress to the final for the first time, where she lost to ninth seed Agnieszka Radwańska, 3–6, 2–6. She next played at the China Open in Beijing, where she was third seed and received a bye into the second round as a result of making the final in Tokyo. She lost in the third round to Ana Ivanovic. After Beijing, Zvonareva became the sixth qualifier for the year-end Tour Championships. At her home tournament, the Kremlin Cup, she reached the quarterfinals, where she lost to the No. 8 seed and eventual champion Dominika Cibulková.

At the Tour Championships, Zvonareva was placed in the Red Group alongside world No. 1, Caroline Wozniacki, 2011 Wimbledon champion Petra Kvitová, and Agnieszka Radwańska. In round-robin play, she fell to Kvitová 2–6, 4–6, before rebounding to defeat Wozniacki 6–2, 4–6, 6–3, her fourth victory over a reigning world No. 1. She then faced Radwańska in her final round-robin match, eventually falling in three sets after not being able to capitalize on three match points serving at 5–3. By virtue of the highest games won percentage of her group after Kvitová, Zvonareva became the second qualifier for the semifinals from the Red Group. She lost to Victoria Azarenka 2–6, 3–6, and ended the year as world No. 7.

=== 2012: Fourth major doubles title and third injury ===
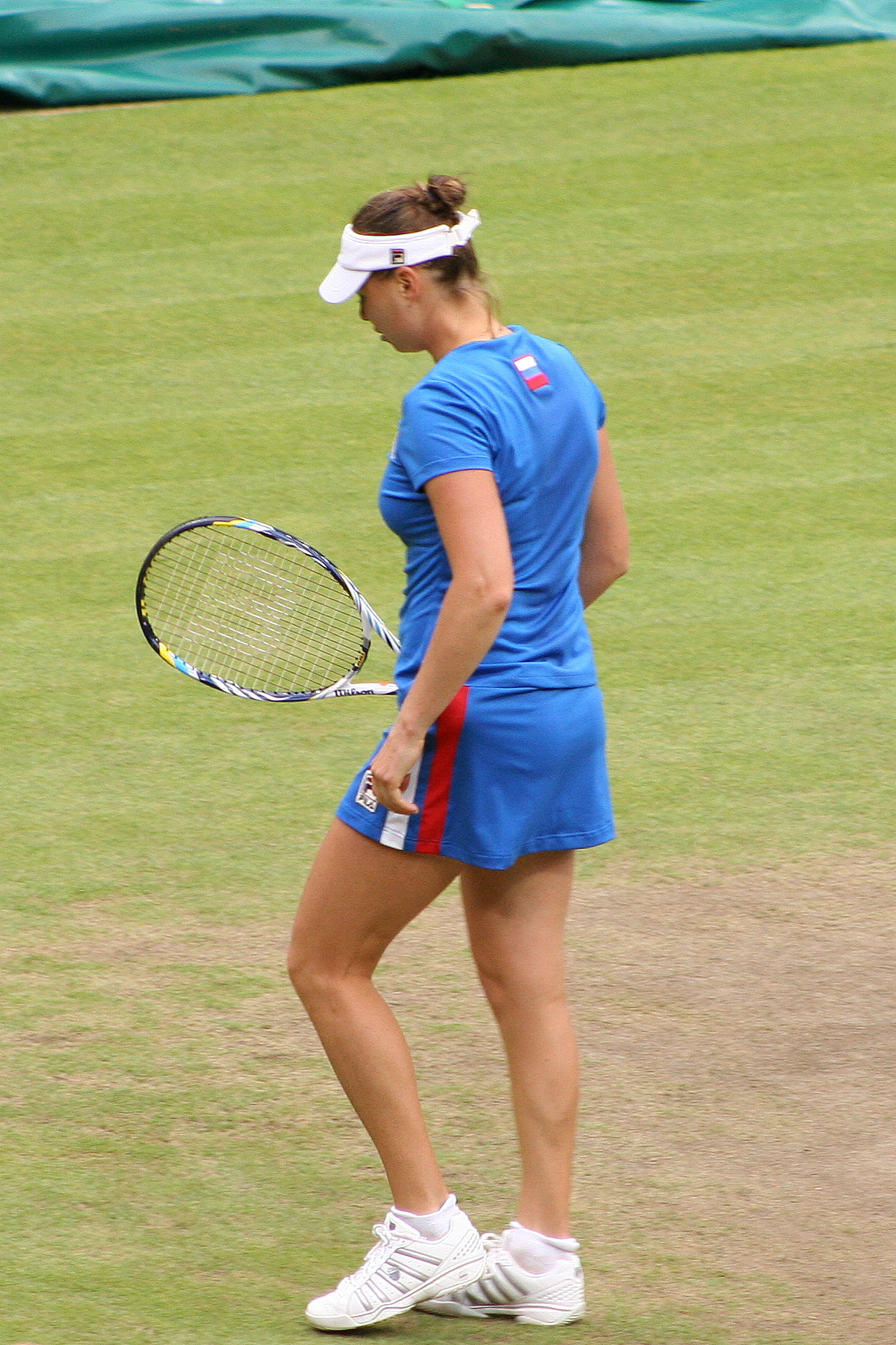
Zvonareva at the 2012 Summer Olympics

Zvonareva began her season at the Sydney International. Seeded sixth, she lost in the opening round to Svetlana Kuznetsova. Seeded seventh at the Australian Open, she was defeated in the third round by compatriot Ekaterina Makarova. She experienced more success in the doubles tournament with partner Kuznetsova. As an unseeded pair, they reached the final, beating defending champions Gisela Dulko and Flavia Pennetta in the process. She and Kuznetsova defeated Sara Errani and Roberta Vinci for the title.

As the top seed at the Pattaya Open, Zvonareva retired during the third set of her quarterfinals match against seventh seed Sorana Cîrstea due to a left hip injury. Seeded sixth and the defending champion at the Qatar Ladies Open, she retired in the second set of her second-round match against Monica Niculescu due to that same injury. Seeded ninth at the Indian Wells Open, she pulled out of her third-round match versus Klára Zakopalová due to a viral illness. As the ninth seed at the Miami Open, she was stunned in the second round by 18-year-old wildcard Garbiñe Muguruza.

Zvonareva began her clay-court season at the Charleston Open. Seeded fourth, she lost in the quarterfinals to ninth seed and eventual finalist Lucie Šafářová. Seeded tenth at the Madrid Open, she was defeated in the first round by Petra Cetkovská. She missed the French Open due to a right shoulder injury.

Seeded 12th at Wimbledon, Zvonareva retired during her third-round match against Kim Clijsters due to a respiratory infection.

Representing Russia at the Summer Olympics, Zvonareva suffered the worst defeat of her entire playing career, losing to eventual gold medalist Serena Williams in the third round.

Zvonareva withdrew from the US Open due to the same illness which forced her to retire from her Wimbledon match against Kim Clijsters in June.

Zvonareva ended the year ranked 98, her lowest ranking since 2002.

=== 2013: Shoulder surgery ===
Zvonareva announced her withdrawal from the Australian Open, citing a shoulder injury, which wound up being serious enough to necessitate surgery. She ended up missing the entire season.

In October, Zvonareva confirmed her intention to return at the Shenzhen Open.

=== 2014: Comeback ===
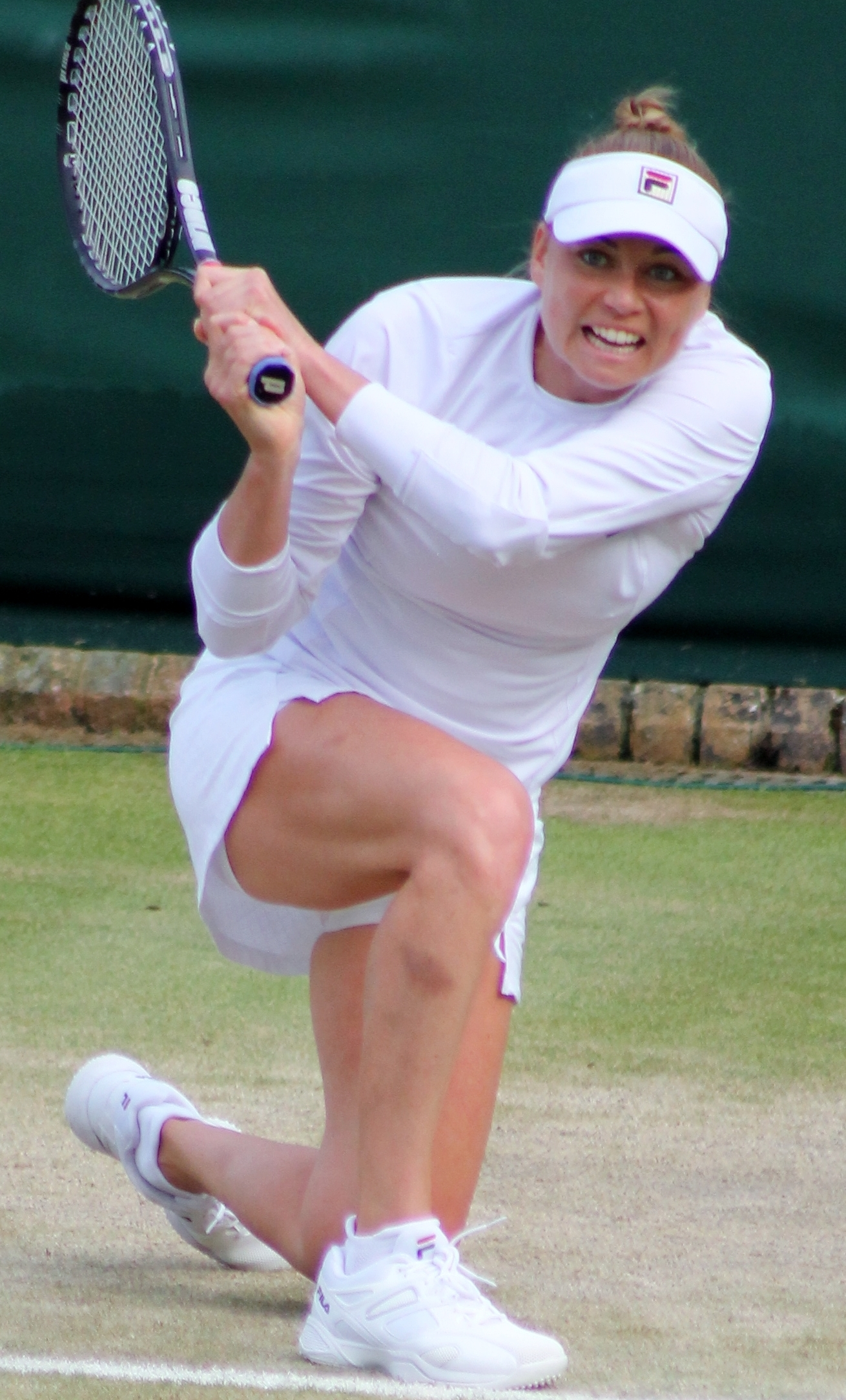
Zvonareva at the 2014 Wimbledon Championships

After one-and-half-year hiatus, Zvonareva officially came back at the Shenzhen Open as a wildcard. She drew top seed and defending champion Li Na in the first round and lost in straight sets. At the Australian Open, she was defeated in the first round by Australian wildcard Casey Dellacqua.

Playing as a wildcard at the Pattaya Open, Zvonareva defeated fellow wildcard Peangtarn Plipuech in the first round for her first win since the 2012 Summer Olympics. She lost in the second round to fourth seed and eventual champion Ekaterina Makarova. In March, she entered the Indian Wells Open as a wildcard but fell in the first round to Peng Shuai.

At the Wimbledon Championships, Zvonareva reached the third round where she lost to Zarina Diyas.

Zvonareva ended the year ranked 251.

=== 2015: Injury lay-off ===
Zvonareva began her 2015 season by playing a $10,000 prize money event in Hong Kong. She played as the second seed; she advanced to the quarterfinals but withdrew from the tournament. Zvonareva used her protected ranking to play at the Shenzhen Open. She reached the quarterfinals where she retired against eighth seed and eventual finalist Timea Bacsinszky due to a lower back injury. At the Australian Open, Zvonareva won her first-round match against qualifier Ons Jabeur. She lost in the second round to world No. 1 and eventual champion, Serena Williams.

Entering the main draw as a wildcard at the Thailand Open, Zvonareva advanced to the quarterfinals after defeating Wang Qiang and eighth seed Zhang Shuai. She was defeated in her quarterfinal match by Marina Erakovic. Competing at Dubai, Zvonareva lost in the first round to Camila Giorgi. In Mexico at the Monterrey Open, Zvonareva upset sixth seed Alison Riske in the first round. She was defeated in the second round by Kristina Mladenovic. Zvonareva lost in the first round at Indian Wells to Polona Hercog. In Miami, Zvonareva was defeated in the first round by Anastasia Pavlyuchenkova. Competing in Poland at the Katowice Open, Zvonareva beat sixth seed Karin Knapp in the first round. She lost in the second round to Klára Koukalová. This was the last match that Zvonareva would play for two years.

Zvonareva ended the year ranked 182.

=== 2017: Another comeback ===
Zvonareva came back to tennis from a two-year hiatus – her last match being at the Katowice Open in April 2015 – and debuted in the $15k tournament in Istanbul. She lost in the main draw to Brit Katie Boulter after retiring in the second set. She then qualified for the $25k tournament in Fergana, Uzbekistan, having been an alternate in the qualifying draw. Zvonareva won her first ITF title in Sharm El Sheikh since 2002's $50k tournament in Naples, Florida. She defeated Slovak Tereza Mihalikova in three sets. This became her overall third ITF title in her career.

Zvonareva won her first match when she returned to the WTA Tour and played at the Connecticut Open. By receiving a wildcard in the qualifying draw, she defeated Anastasia Rodionova in three sets. However, she retired from her second round match against Magdaléna Rybáriková with an Achilles injury, after losing the first set 7–5. Zvonareva then got into the US Open qualifying rounds, reaching the second round where she lost to Jamie Loeb in three sets. She then participated in the WTA 125 Dalian Open, reaching the final which she lost to Kateryna Kozlova. At the Tashkent Open, she reached her first WTA Tour semifinal in nearly six years as a qualifier.

=== 2018: First WTA Tour title in six years ===
Zvonareva began her 2018 season at the Playford International. She retired from her quarterfinals match against sixth seed Marie Bouzková. At the Australian Open, she fell in the first round of qualifying to compatriot, Anna Kalinskaya.

After the Australian Open, Zvonareva received a wildcard for the St. Petersburg Ladies' Trophy. She won the first set of her first-round match against Kiki Bertens. However, her opponent retired due to illness. She lost in the second round to second seed Jeļena Ostapenko. In doubles, she and Timea Bacsinszky won the title beating Alla Kudryavtseva/Katarina Srebotnik in the final. This was her first WTA doubles final in six years and her first title as a mother. In Doha, she was defeated in the final round of qualifying by Duan Yingying.

Zvonareva qualified for the main draw at the Wimbledon Championships, her first Wimbledon main-draw appearance since 2014. However, she lost to eventual champion Angelique Kerber in a tight match in the first round. She then won her second WTA title of the year at the Moscow River Cup alongside compatriot Anastasia Potapova.

At the US Open, the Russian reached the main draw after saving five match points against Zhu Lin in the final qualifying round. For the first time since 2015, she advanced into the second round of a Major after beating compatriot Anna Blinkova in the first round, although she lost to Aryna Sabalenka in straight sets.

Zvonareva had a strong end to the year at the Kremlin Cup, after reaching the quarterfinals as a qualifier, notching a top 10 win over Karolína Plíšková with the loss of just three games. Her last tournament of the year was the Open de Limoges, where she reached the singles semifinal and the doubles final alongside Galina Voskoboeva.

=== 2019: Back to top 100 in singles, wrist injury ===
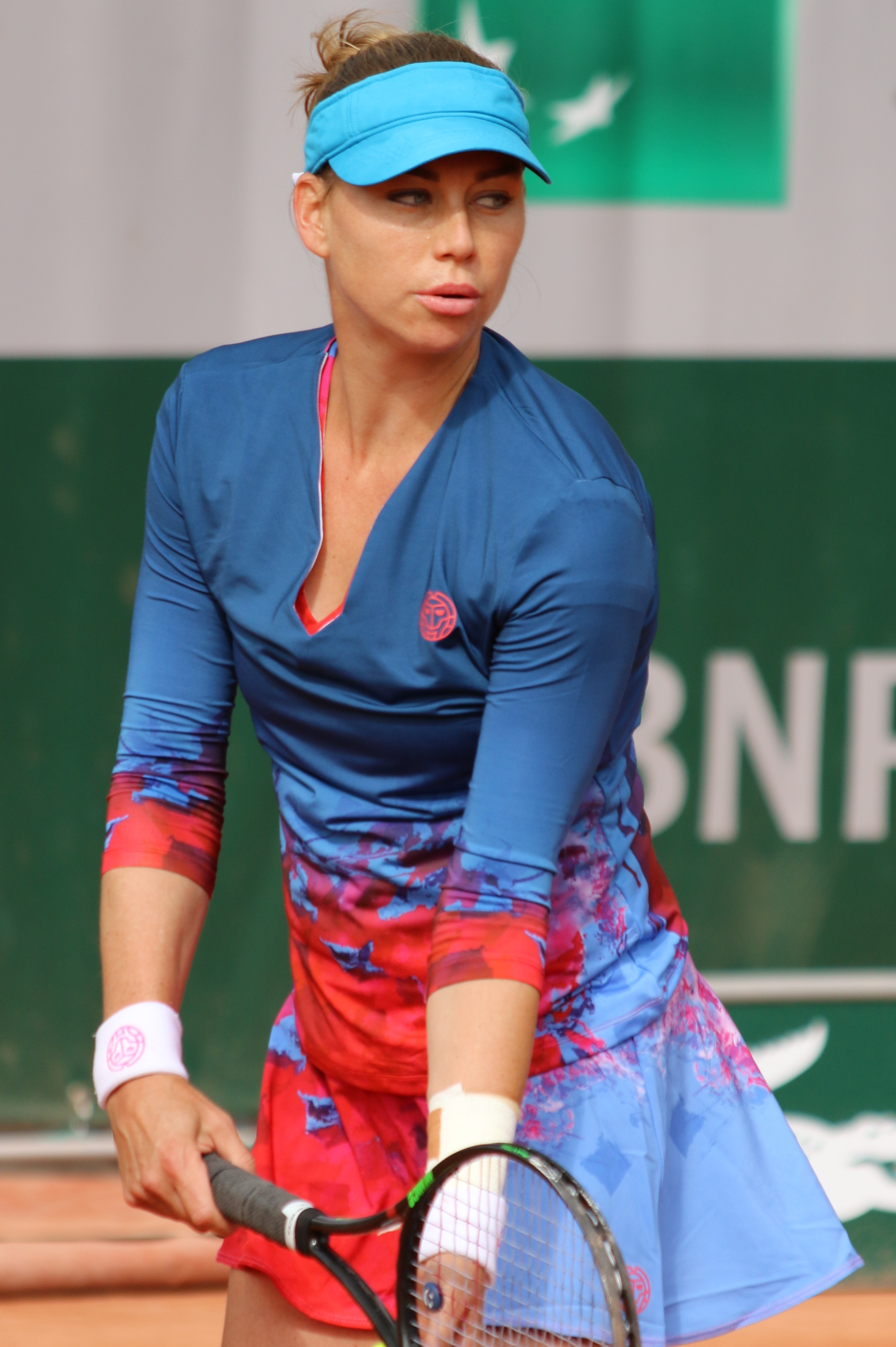
Zvonareva at the 2019 French Open

Zvonareva started the 2019 season at the Shenzhen Open. She reached the semifinals where she was set to face two-time finalist Alison Riske. She retired from the match due to a left hip injury. As the top seed for qualifying at the Australian Open, she fell in the first round of qualifying to Australian Astra Sharma.

After the Australian Open, Zvonareva competed in St. Petersburg where she upset fifth seed Julia Görges in the second round in three sets. She then beat third seed and compatriot, Daria Kasatkina, in the quarterfinals. She lost in the semifinals to eighth seed Donna Vekić. At the Hungarian Open, she was defeated in the first round by top seed, defending champion, and eventual champion, Alison Van Uytvanck. In doubles, she and Ekaterina Alexandrova won the title beating Fanny Stollár/Heather Watson in the final. In Indian Wells, she was forced to retire from her qualifying match against American Christina McHale.

Starting her clay-court season at the Stuttgart Open, Zvonareva fell in the final round of qualifying to Mandy Minella. However, due to Garbiñe Muguruza pulling out of the tournament due to illness, she got a lucky loser spot into the main draw. She lost in the first round to Victoria Azarenka. At the Morocco Open, she was defeated in the first round by Lara Arruabarrena. Getting past qualifying at the Madrid Open, she was eliminated in the first round by Danielle Collins. In doubles, she and Jeļena Ostapenko reached the semifinals where they lost to Gabriela Dabrowski/Xu Yifan. In Rome, she was beaten in the first round of qualifying by Maria Sakkari. Ranked 78 at the French Open, she lost her first-round match to qualifier Aliona Bolsova.

Zvonareva played doubles with Raquel Atawo at the Eastbourne International. They reached the quarterfinals; however, Zvonareva withdrew from the match due to a left wrist injury. This same injury caused her to pull out of Wimbledon.

Due to not playing any more tournaments, Zvonareva ended the year ranked 141.

=== 2020: Back to top 100 in doubles and first major title in eight years ===
Zvonareva missed the Australian Open due to problems with her left wrist. She started her season in February at the $25k tournament in Trnava, Slovakia. Seeded eighth, she lost in the second round to qualifier and compatriot, Vlada Koval. In St. Petersburg, she fell in the final round of qualifying to Alizé Cornet. At the Qatar Open, she was defeated in the second round by Zheng Saisai. At the Indian Wells Challenger, she reached the semifinals before she withdrew from her match against Misaki Doi. The WTA Tour was suspended from the week of March 9 through July due to the COVID-19 pandemic.

When the WTA resumed tournament play in August, Zvonareva competed at the Lexington Challenger where she was eliminated in the first round by Jessica Pegula. In doubles, she and Anna Blinkova reached the semifinals and lost to Hayley Carter/Luisa Stefani. The Cincinnati Open was held at the USTA BJK National Tennis Center for the first time, lowering the risk of the transmission of the virus behind closed doors. Getting past qualifying, she made it to the third round before falling to eighth seed Johanna Konta. Ranked 178 at the US Open, she was beaten in the first round by Leylah Fernandez. In doubles, she and Laura Siegemund won the title defeating Nicole Melichar/Xu Yifan in the final.

Zvonareva then played at the Italian Open where she lost in the first round to qualifier and compatriot, Daria Kasatkina. At the French Open, she was defeated in the final round of qualifying by Monica Niculescu.

In October, Zvonareva competed at the first edition of the Ostrava Open. Playing doubles with Jeļena Ostapenko, they reached the quarterfinals where they fell to eventual champions Elise Mertens/Aryna Sabalenka. Seeded seventh at the $25k tournament in Istanbul, she made it to the final where she was beaten by top seed Kaia Kanepi. At the Linz Open, her final tournament of the season, she lost in the second round to second seed and eventual finalist, Elise Mertens, in three sets.

Zvonareva ended the year ranked 163 in singles and 40 in doubles.

=== 2021: Back to top 100 in singles and top 50 in doubles ===
Zvonareva began the year at the first edition of the Abu Dhabi Open. She lost in the second round to second seed Elina Svitolina. At the first edition of the Yarra Valley Classic, she made it to the third round where she was defeated by eighth seed Markéta Vondroušová. At the Australian Open, she was eliminated in the first round by 17th seed Elena Rybakina.

In Dubai, she was beaten in the final round of qualifying by Kaia Kanepi. She reached the semifinals at the St. Petersburg Ladies' Trophy where she lost to compatriot Margarita Gasparyan.

In April, Zvonareva competed at the Istanbul Cup. She lost in the second round to Fiona Ferro. Getting past qualifying at the Madrid Open, she was defeated in the first round by fifth seed and eventual champion, Aryna Sabalenka. Passing through qualifying at the Italian Open, she upset 11th seed and world No. 10, Petra Kvitová, in her second-round match. She lost in the third round to ninth seed and 2019 champion, Karolína Plíšková. For the first time since August 2019, she returned to the top 100 in singles by climbing 17 spots to No. 96, on 17 May 2021. At the first edition of the Serbia Open, she played doubles alongside Tímea Babos. As the second seeds, they reached the semifinals where they fell to eventual champions Aleksandra Krunić/Nina Stojanović. At the French Open, she was eliminated in the final round of qualifying by Anna Karolína Schmiedlová.

Coming through qualifying at the Eastbourne International, Zvonareva retired during her first-round match against Daria Kasatkina due to a hip injury. Ranked 96 at Wimbledon, she won her first-round match over Marie Bouzková but was beaten in the second round by seventh seed and 2020 French Open champion, Iga Świątek.

Seeded fourth at the Thoreau Open, Zvonareva reached the semifinals where she fell to eventual champion Magdalena Fręch. At the Cincinnati Open, she lost in the first round of qualifying to compatriot Liudmila Samsonova. Competing at the first edition of the Cleveland Open, she beat qualifier Ulrikke Eikeri in the first round. She withdrew from her second-round match against seventh seed Sara Sorribes Tormo due to a right ankle injury. Ranked 101 at the US Open, she was defeated in the first round by top seed Ashleigh Barty.

In December, Zvonareva played at the first edition of the Open Angers Loire. Seeded sixth, she was eliminated in the second round by qualifier Natalia Vikhlyantseva. However, in doubles, she and Monica Niculescu reached the final and lost to Tereza Mihalíková/Greet Minnen. She competed in her final tournament of the season at the Open de Limoges. Seeded sixth, she made it to the semifinals where she lost to second seed and eventual champion, Alison Van Uytvanck. In doubles, she and Niculescu won the title beating Estelle Cascino/Jessika Ponchet in the final.

Zvonareva ended the year ranked 87 in singles and 53 in doubles.

=== 2022: Resurgence & back to top 25 in doubles, out of top 250 in singles ===
Zvonareva started her 2022 season at the first edition of the Melbourne Summer Set 1. She upset ninth seed Alison Riske in the first round. She lost in the second round to qualifier Zheng Qinwen. In doubles, she and Viktória Kužmová fell in the semifinals to eventual champions, Asia Muhammad/Jessica Pegula. At the Australian Open, she was defeated in the first round by 19th seed and 2018 semifinalist, Elise Mertens.

A six-match losing streak in singles saw Zvonareva fall in the first round of the St. Petersburg Ladies' Trophy to Tereza Martincová, and at the Dubai Tennis Championships to top-10 player Ons Jabeur in a tight three-setter and consecutive losses to Alison Van Uytvanck at the Qatar Open and at the Lyon Open. However, she managed to reach the doubles semifinals in St. Petersburg alongside Anastasia Potapova and won the doubles title in Lyon with Laura Siegemund. Her losing streak ended in Miami where she started from qualifying, but won four matches in a row, including a straight-sets win over 19th seed Tamara Zidanšek in the round of 64, before losing to ninth seed Danielle Collins in the round of 32. With this result, she returned to the top 100 in singles rankings. At the same tournament she won the doubles with Laura Siegemund, defeating Veronika Kudermetova and Elise Mertens in the final. She finished the year ranked No. 273 in singles and No. 31 in doubles.

=== 2023: Another major final, WTA Finals champion & back to top 10 ===
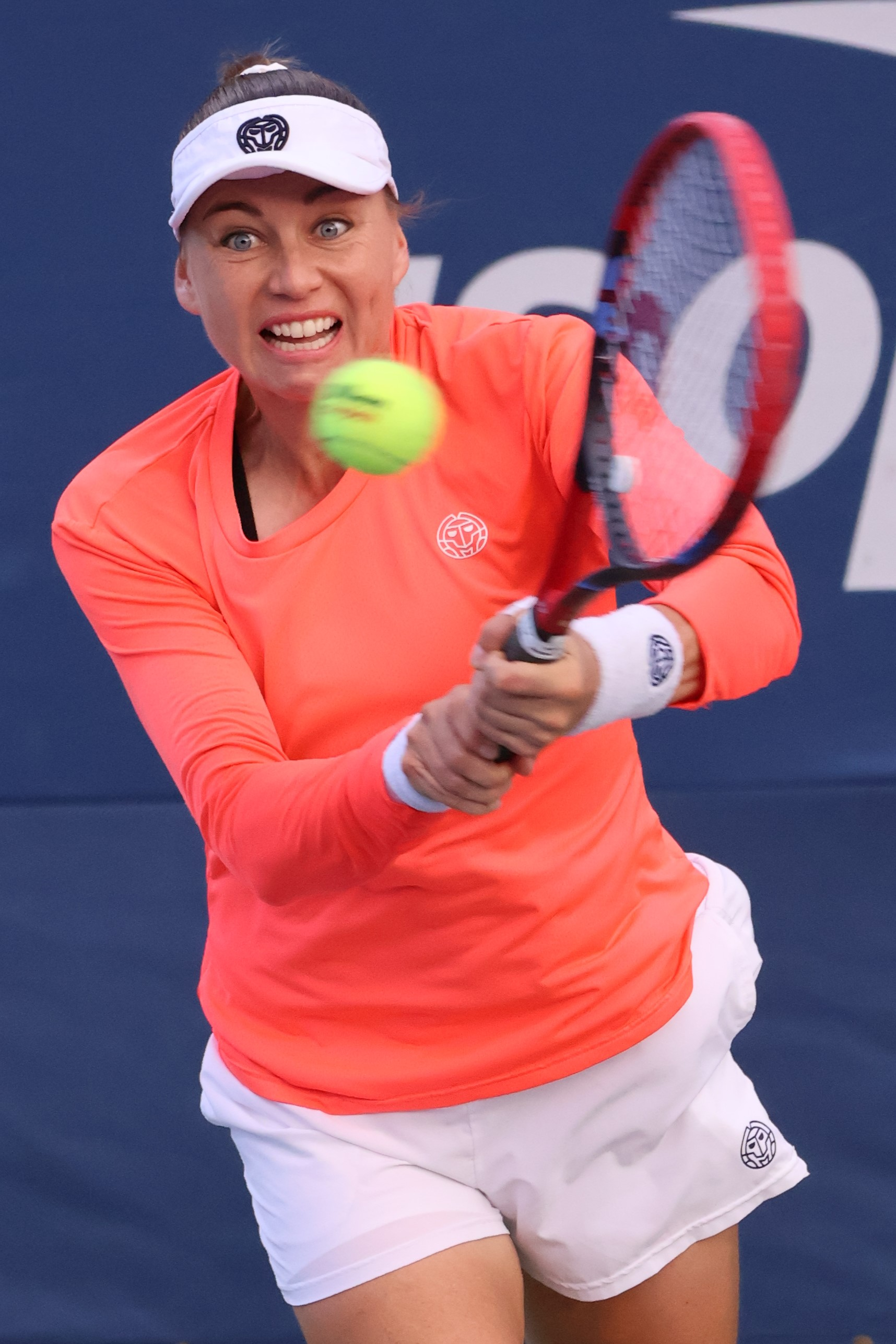
Zvonareva at the 2023 US Open

In singles, she dropped out of the top 500 on 3 April 2023.

In doubles, she reached the final at the US Open with Laura Siegemund. At the same tournament she qualified for the singles main draw.

She received a wildcard for the singles main draw at the China Open. Ranked No. 369, she qualified for the main draw of the WTA 500 Zhengzhou Open and defeated ninth seed and compatriot Veronika Kudermetova, her first top-20 win since Rome in May 2021.

She then won her second doubles title of the season at the Ningbo Open with Laura Siegemund. Following her third doubles title for the season at the Jiangxi Open, she qualified with Siegemund for the WTA Finals in Cancun. It was her second qualification in doubles for the year-end prestigious event. Next the pair Siegemund/Zvonareva reached the final, a first time at this level for both players. They won the title defeating Nicole Melichar-Martinez and Ellen Perez.

She finished the year ranked No. 256 in singles and No. 9 in doubles.

=== 2024-2025: Roland Garros doubles quarterfinal, hiatus, comeback ===
In the beginning of 2024 Zvonareva skipped Australian summer tournaments and started her season in Middle East. She won only one match out of four in doubles. She entered singles qualification at Abu Dhabi Open but lost to top seed Linda Nosková in the opening round.

Zvonareva played singles at couple of ITF and WTA events on clay but won only one match at small event in Larnaca but it was much better in doubles as she reached final at 125k event in Antalya with Tímea Babos.

Zvonareva reached the doubles quarterfinal, her 12th at a Grand Slam, with Mirra Andreeva but they withdrew before the match due to Zvonareva´s shoulder injury. She later underwent arthroscopic surgery and did not appear on courts for 18 months.

Zvonareva made a comeback in December 2025 at the Dubai Tennis Challenge where she received wildcard to main draw in singles and as an alternates in doubles with Rada Zolotareva. She went on to reach finals in both draws, losing to 21 years younger Petra Marčinko in straight sets.

=== 2026: Australian Open doubles semifinal, back to top 50 ===
Zvonareva, paired with Japanese player Ena Shibahara, started the 2026 season by reaching WTA 125k final in Canberra. This duo then competed at Australian Open, where they beat two seeded teams and reached the semifinals before being defeated by Elise Mertens and Zhang Shuai. Despite being unranked in December 2025, after playing just three events, Zvonareva returned to the Top 100 in the doubles rankings at No. 85 on 2 February 2026. At the Qatar Open, she became the 4th woman over the age of 40, after Kimiko Date, Serena Williams, Venus Williams to win a singles main draw match at a WTA 1000 event, when she beat No. 50 Peyton Stearns in round 1 as a qualifier ranked 584.

At the Dubai Tennis Championships, she partnered her former long-term partner Laura Siegemund and this duo reached a final, first WTA final since 2023 WTA Finals for Zvonareva, without dropping a set. They were beaten by Gabriela Dabrowski and Luisa Stefani in straight sets. She needed just 6 events in doubles to return to the Top 50, at world No. 47 on 23 February 2026.

== Rivalries ==
=== Zvonareva vs. Wozniacki ===
Zvonareva and Caroline Wozniacki have met nine times, with Zvonareva leading their head-to-head 5–4.

They have met in three finals, Wozniacki winning two of them: in rain-delayed finals at the 2010 Rogers Cup and the China Open, the latter of which was contested whilst they reigned as two of the top three players in the world, whilst Zvonareva prevailed in Qatar in 2011. In 2010, they met in two important semifinals: Zvonareva winning at the US Open and Wozniacki prevailing at the 2010 WTA Tour Championships in a match which decided which of the two would finish 2010 ranked world No. 1.

=== Zvonareva vs. Radwańska ===
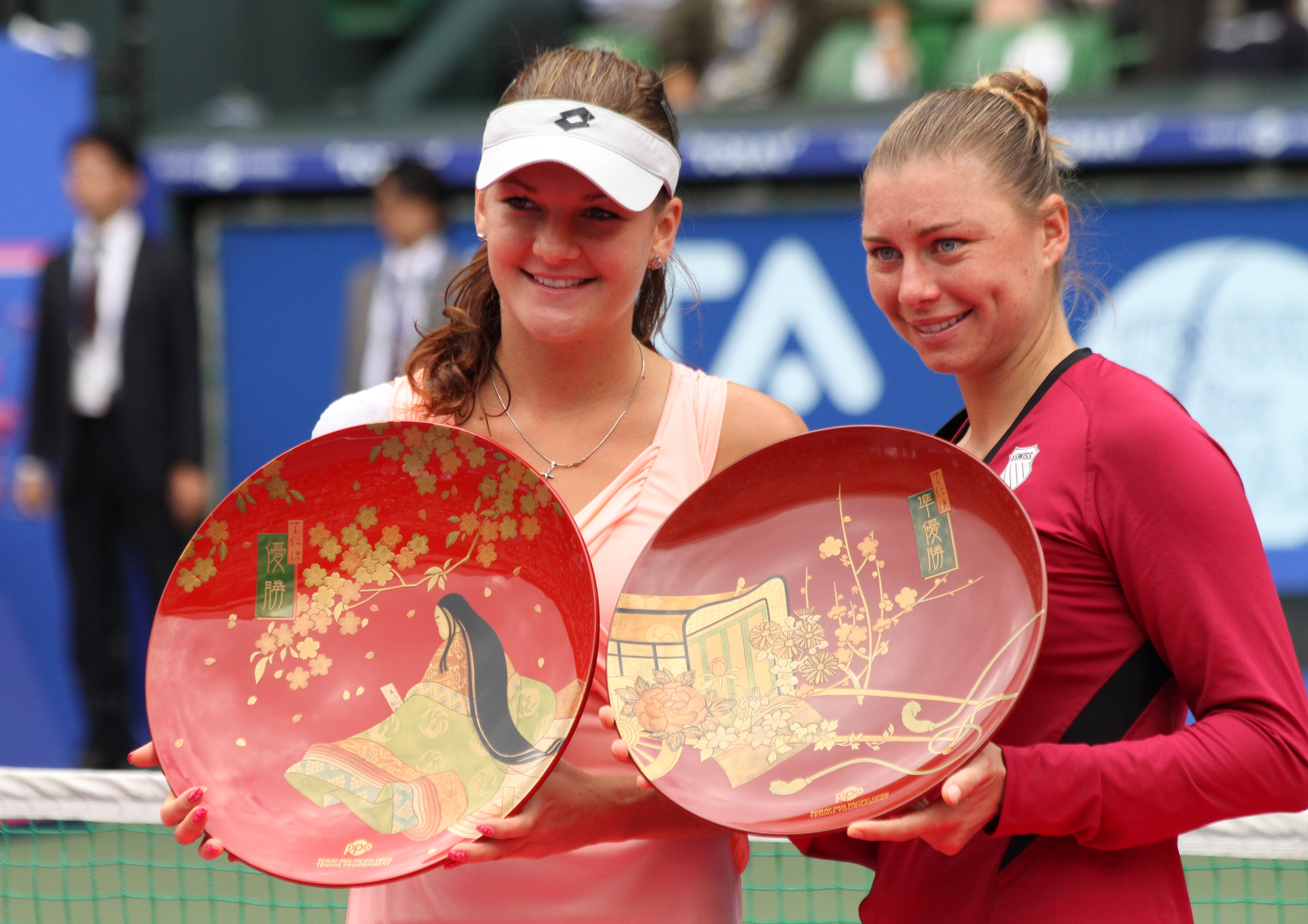
Radwańska and Zvonareva following the 2011 Pan Pacific Open final.

Zvonareva had a rivalry with the Polish player Agnieszka Radwańska, which began in 2007. Radwańska led the series 4–2.

Throughout their meetings, Radwańska matched Zvonareva's pace and movements around the court, with Zvonareva considered the more powerful of the two, but Radwańska noted as more focused at times, utilizing what Sports Illustrated's Courtney Nguyen dubbed "selective aggression" during their matches in 2011.

At the 2007 Kremlin Cup, Zvonareva won their first meeting in straight sets. The two did not play again until 2011, when Radwańska won four of their five matches, including the finals of the Mercury Insurance Open and the Pan Pacific Open. Their final meeting of 2011 was an acclaimed match at the WTA Championships. In the third set, Zvonareva served for the match while leading 5–3. However, Radwańska saved three match points and went on to win 1–6, 6–2, 7–5. The victory marked Radwańska's fourth straight win against Zvonareva, whom she described as "very consistent and always tough to beat."

=== Zvonareva vs. Clijsters ===
Zvonareva has a 3–7 record against Kim Clijsters.

The Belgian won their first five matches, from 2002 until Clijsters' first retirement in 2007. When Clijsters returned in 2010, Zvonareva won the next three matches, including one at the 2010 Wimbledon Championships, then lost the US Open final. Clijsters won their meeting at the 2011 Australian Open. They met for the final time at Wimbledon 2012, where Zvonareva retired after the second set for medical reasons.

=== Zvonareva vs. Stosur ===
Zvonareva has a 3–8 head-to-head record against Samantha Stosur. She lost eight times in a row to the Australian before coming from behind to win 4–6, 6–2, 6–2 at the 2020 Indian Wells Challenger. Zvonareva has never lost to any other player eight times in a row.

Stosur puts heavy topspin onto the ball, which has proven detrimental to Zvonareva's ball-striking ability. Stosur's style has impeded Zvonareva's ability to predict where Stosur is going to place the ball when she runs around her backhand to hit her forehand inside out.

== Personal life ==
In 2007, Zvonareva graduated from the Russian State University of Physical Education with a degree in Physical Education. She studied for a second degree in international economic relations at the Diplomatic Academy of the Ministry of Foreign Affairs in Moscow.

On 23 August 2016, Zvonareva announced her marriage. Her husband Alexander Kucher is a former officer who worked in the administration of the Moscow Oblast and currently works in the logistic division of the German hardware store OBI. Their daughter Evelina was born in 2016.

=== Politics ===
In March 2022, Zvonareva wore a visor with the words “No War” on the side during her third-round match at the Miami Open, following the Russian invasion of Ukraine.

In July 2023, she was controversially denied entry into Poland after she tried entering with a French visa to play at the 2023 WTA Poland Open.

== Career statistics ==
=== Performance timelines ===
Key
W	F	SF	QF	#R	RR	Q#	DNQ	A	NH

(W) winner; (F) finalist; (SF) semifinalist; (QF) quarterfinalist; (#R) rounds 4, 3, 2, 1; (RR) round-robin stage; (Q#) qualification round; (DNQ) did not qualify; (A) absent; (NH) not held; (SR) strike rate (events won / competed); (W–L) win–loss record.
To avoid confusion and double counting, these charts are updated at the conclusion of a tournament or when the player's participation has ended.

==== Singles ====
Tournament	2002	2003	2004	2005	2006	2007	2008	2009	2010	2011	2012	2013	2014	2015	2016	2017	2018	2019	2020	2021	2022	2023	SR	W–L
Grand Slam tournaments
Australian Open	A	1R	4R	2R	1R	4R	1R	SF	4R	SF	3R	A	1R	2R	A	A	Q1	Q1	A	1R	1R	A	0 / 14	23–14
French Open	4R	QF	3R	3R	1R	A	4R	A	2R	4R	A	A	A	A	A	A	A	1R	Q3	Q3	A	A	0 / 9	18–9
Wimbledon	2R	4R	4R	2R	1R	A	2R	3R	F	3R	3R	A	3R	A	A	A	1R	A	NH	2R	A	Q2	0 / 13	24–12
US Open	3R	3R	4R	A	3R	3R	2R	4R	F	QF	A	A	A	A	A	Q2	2R	A	1R	1R	A	1R	0 / 13	26–13
Win–loss	6–3	9–4	11–4	4–3	2–4	5–2	5–4	10–2	16–4	14–4	4–2	0–0	2–2	1–1	0–0	0–0	1–2	0–1	0–1	1–3	0–1	0–1	0 / 49	91–48
Year-end championships
WTA Finals	DNQ		RR	DNQ			F	RR	SF	SF	DNQ								NH	DNQ			0 / 5	9–10
Career statistics
Titles	0	1	1	1	2	0	2	2	1	2	0	0	0	0	0	0	0	0	0	0	0	0	Career total: 12	
Finals	1	1	3	1	3	1	8	2	6	4	0	0	0	0	0	0	0	0	0	0	0	0	Career total: 30	
Year-end ranking	45	13	11	42	24	23	7	9	2	7	98	N/A	251	182	N/A	204	123	141	163	87	273	256		

==== Doubles ====
Tournament	2003	2004	2005	2006	2007	2008	2009	2010	2011	2012	2013	2014	2015	...	2018	2019	2020	2021	2022	2023	2024	2025	2026	SR	W–L
Grand Slam tournaments
Australian Open	A	1R	SF	QF	3R	A	3R	A	2R	W	A	1R	A		A	1R	A	3R	3R	A	A	A	SF	1 / 12	26–10
French Open	A	3R	3R	QF	A	2R	A	2R	2R	A	A	A	A		A	2R	2R	1R	A	1R	QF	A	QF	0 / 12	16–11
Wimbledon	A	2R	QF	2R	A	2R	1R	F	A	A	A	1R	A		2R	A	NH	3R	A	QF	A	A	3R	0 / 11	18–10
US Open	A	A	A	W	2R	2R	2R	QF	2R	A	A	A	A		3R	A	W	A	A	F	A	A		2 / 9	25–5
Win–loss	0–0	3–2	9–3	13–3	3–1	3–3	3–2	9–3	3–2	6–0	0–0	0–2	0–0		3–2	1–2	6–1	4–3	2–1	7–3	3–0	0–0	7–3	3 / 44	85–36
Year-end championships
WTA Finals	DNQ				SF	DNQ											NH	DNQ		W	DNQ			1 / 2	4–2
Career statistics
Titles	0	1	1	2	0	0	1	0	0	1	0	0	0		2	1	1	0	2	4	0	0	1	Career total: 17	
Finals	1	2	3	2	0	1	1	1	0	1	0	0	0		2	1	1	0	2	5	0	0	3	Career total: 26	
Year-end ranking	73	15	10	18	72	48	58	33	83	33	N/A	345	174		56	71	40	53	31	9	78	N/A			

==== Mixed doubles ====
Tournament	2003	2004	2005	2006	2007	...	2010	...	2012	...	2021	...	2023	2024	...	2026	SR	W–L	Win %
Grand Slam tournaments
Australian Open	A	A	QF	QF	1R		A		A		2R		A	A		1R	0 / 5	5–5	50%
French Open	A	A	A	SF	A		A		A		A		1R	1R		1R	0 / 4	3–4	43%
Wimbledon	A	A	A	W	A		2R		2R		2R		A	A		1R	1 / 5	8–3	73%
US Open	1R	W	A	1R	A		A		A		A		1R	A		A	1 / 4	5–3	63%
Win–loss	0–1	5–0	2–1	10–3	0–1		1–1		1–0		2–2		0–2	0–1		0–3	2 / 18	21–15	58%

== Grand Slam tournament finals ==
=== Singles: 2 (2 runner-ups) ===
Result	Year	Championship	Surface	Opponent	Score
Loss	2010	Wimbledon	Grass	(United States) Serena Williams	3–6, 2–6
Loss	2010	US Open	Hard	(Belgium) Kim Clijsters	2–6, 1–6

=== Doubles: 5 (3 titles, 2 runner-ups) ===
Result	Year	Championship	Surface	Partner	Opponents	Score
Win	2006	US Open	Hard	(France) Nathalie Dechy	(Russia) Dinara Safina (Slovenia) Katarina Srebotnik	7–6^{(7–5)}, 7–5
Loss	2010	Wimbledon	Grass	(Russia) Elena Vesnina	(United States) Vania King (Kazakhstan) Yaroslava Shvedova	6–7^{(6–8)}, 2–6
Win	2012	Australian Open	Hard	(Russia) Svetlana Kuznetsova	(Italy) Sara Errani (Italy) Roberta Vinci	5–7, 6–4, 6–3
Win	2020	US Open	Hard	(Germany) Laura Siegemund	(United States) Nicole Melichar (China) Xu Yifan	6–4, 6–4
Loss	2023	US Open	Hard	(Germany) Laura Siegemund	(Canada) Gabriela Dabrowski (New Zealand) Erin Routliffe	6–7^{(9–11)}, 3–6

=== Mixed doubles: 2 (2 titles) ===
Result	Year	Championship	Surface	Partner	Opponents	Score
Win	2004	US Open	Hard	(United States) Bob Bryan	(Australia) Alicia Molik (Australia) Todd Woodbridge	6–3, 6–4
Win	2006	Wimbledon	Grass	(Israel) Andy Ram	(United States) Venus Williams (United States) Bob Bryan	6–3, 6–2

== Other significant finals ==
=== Year-end championships ===
==== Singles: 1 (runner–up) ====
Result	Year	Championship	Surface	Opponent	Score
Loss	2008	WTA Championships, Doha	Hard	(United States) Venus Williams	7–6^{(7–5)}, 0–6, 2–6

==== Doubles: 1 (title) ====
Result	Year	Championship	Surface	Partner	Opponents	Score
Win	2023	WTA Finals, Cancún	Hard	(Germany) Laura Siegemund	(United States) Nicole Melichar-Martinez (Australia) Ellen Perez	6–4, 6–4

== Notes ==
Sporting positions
Preceded by (Spain) María José Martínez Sánchez	Orange Bowl Girls' Singles Champion; Category: 18 and under 2000; 2001	Succeeded by (Russia) Vera Dushevina
