= 2024 Zavarovalnica Sava Ljubljana =

- Date: 9–15 September
- Edition: 2nd
- Category: WTA 125
- Draw: 32S / 16D
- Prize money: $115,000
- Surface: Clay
- Location: Ljubljana, Slovenia
- Venue: Tivoli Tennis Center

Champions

Singles
- (Switzerland) Jil Teichmann

Doubles
- (Italy) Nuria Brancaccio / (Spain) Leyre Romero Gormaz
← 2023 ·	Ljubljana Open	· 2025 →

The 2024 WTA Zavarovalnica Sava Ljubljana was a professional women's tennis tournament played on outdoor clay courts. It was the second edition of the tournament and part of the 2024 WTA 125 tournaments, offering a total of $115,000 in prize money. It took place at the Tivoli Tennis Center in Ljubljana, Slovenia between 9 and 15 September 2024.

== Singles entrants ==
=== Seeds ===
Country	Player	Rank^{1}	Seed
FRA	Chloé Paquet	97	1
ESP	Nuria Párrizas Díaz	100	2
SRB	Olga Danilović	110	3
CZE	Sára Bejlek	129	4
GER	Ella Seidel	133	5
BRA	Laura Pigossi	141	6
CRO	Lea Bošković	165	7
	Polina Kudermetova	169	8

- ^{1} Rankings are as of 26 August 2024.

=== Other entrants ===
The following players received a wildcard into the singles main draw:

- Kristina Dmitruk
- (Slovenia) Živa Falkner
- (Slovenia) Pia Lovrič
- (Slovenia) Ela Nala Milić

The following player received entry as a special exempt:

- (Croatia) Petra Marčinko

The following players received entry into the main draw through qualification:

- (United States) Louisa Chirico
- (Spain) Ángela Fita Boluda
- (Austria) Sinja Kraus
- (Turkey) İpek Öz

The following player received entry as a lucky loser:

- (Switzerland) Susan Bandecchi

=== Withdrawals ===
- (United States) Varvara Lepchenko → replaced by (Switzerland) Susan Bandecchi

== Doubles entrants ==
=== Seeds ===
Country	Player	Country	Player	Rank	Seed
FRA	Estelle Cascino	CZE	Anastasia Dețiuc	230	1
CZE	Jesika Malečková	CZE	Miriam Škoch	240	2
UKR	Maryna Kolb	UKR	Nadiia Kolb	384	3
GRE	Eleni Christofi	SLO	Veronika Erjavec	402	4

- Rankings as of 26 August 2024.

=== Other entrants ===
The following pair received a wildcard into the doubles main draw:

- (Slovenia) Ela Nala Milić / (Slovenia) Kristina Novak
- (Slovenia) Kaja Najzer / (Slovenia) Zoja Peternel

== Champions ==
=== Singles ===
- (Switzerland) Jil Teichmann def. (Spain) Nuria Párrizas Díaz, 7–6^{(10–8)}, 6–4

=== Doubles ===
- (Italy) Nuria Brancaccio / (Spain) Leyre Romero Gormaz def. (North Macedonia) Lina Gjorcheska / (Switzerland) Jil Teichmann 5–7, 7–5, [10–7]
