= 2024 Zavarovalnica Sava Ljubljana – Doubles =

Doubles
- 2024 Zavarovalnica Sava Ljubljana

Final
- Champions: (Italy) Nuria Brancaccio (Spain) Leyre Romero Gormaz
- Runners-up: (North Macedonia) Lina Gjorcheska (Switzerland) Jil Teichmann
- Score: 5–7, 7–5, [10–7]

Events
Singles	Doubles
← 2023 ·	BMW Ljubljana Open	· 2025 →

Amina Anshba and Quinn Gleason were the reigning champions, but they chose to compete in Bucharest and Monastir, respectively, this year.

Nuria Brancaccio and Leyre Romero Gormaz won the title, defeating Lina Gjorcheska and Jil Teichmann in the final, 5–7, 7–5, [10–7].

== Seeds ==
1. (France) Estelle Cascino / (Czech Republic) Anastasia Dețiuc (semifinals)
2. (Czech Republic) Jesika Malečková / (Czech Republic) Miriam Škoch (semifinals)
3. (Ukraine) Maryna Kolb / (Ukraine) Nadiia Kolb (first round)
4. (Greece) Eleni Christofi / (Slovenia) Veronika Erjavec (quarterfinals)

== Draw ==
=== Key ===
- Q = Qualifier
- WC = Wild card
- LL = Lucky loser
- Alt = Alternate
- SE = Special exempt
- PR = Protected ranking
- ITF = ITF entry
- JE = Junior exempt
- w/o = Walkover
- r = Retired
- d = Defaulted
- SR = Special ranking

=== Draw ===
First round
1	(France) E Cascino (Czech Republic) A Dețiuc	6	6
(Slovakia) V Hrunčáková (Ukraine) K Zavatska	3	4
WC	(Slovenia) K Najzer (Slovenia) Z Peternel	6^{5}	4
(United Kingdom) S Anane (Ukraine) Mari Kostyuk	7^{7}	6
3	(Ukraine) M Kolb (Ukraine) N Kolb	6^{5}	0
(North Macedonia) L Gjorcheska (Switzerland) J Teichmann	7^{7}	6
(Czech Republic) K Kubáňová (Czech Republic) A Laboutková	2	6	[10]
(Slovenia) Ž Falkner (Slovenia) P Lovrič	6	2	[4]
(Slovenia) N Jurič (Slovenia) A Senica	2	1
(Italy) N Brancaccio (Spain) L Romero Gormaz	6	6
(Czech Republic) M Bayerlová (Croatia) M Dražić	4	0
4	(Greece) E Christofi (Slovenia) V Erjavec	6	6
WC	(Slovenia) EN Milić (Slovenia) K Novak	3	6	[4]
(Latvia) D Marcinkēviča (Greece) S Sakellaridi	6	2	[10]
(Spain) Á Fita Boluda (Andorra) V Jiménez Kasintseva	3	5
2	(Czech Republic) J Malečková (Czech Republic) M Škoch	6	7

Quarterfinals
1	(France) E Cascino (Czech Republic) A Dețiuc	6	6
(United Kingdom) S Anane (Ukraine) Mari Kostyuk	2	1
(North Macedonia) L Gjorcheska (Switzerland) J Teichmann	2	7^{7}	[10]
(Czech Republic) K Kubáňová (Czech Republic) A Laboutková	6	6^{5}	[5]
(Italy) N Brancaccio (Spain) L Romero Gormaz	6^{2}	7	[10]
4	(Greece) E Christofi (Slovenia) V Erjavec	7^{7}	5	[4]
(Latvia) D Marcinkēviča (Greece) S Sakellaridi	2	4
2	(Czech Republic) J Malečková (Czech Republic) M Škoch	6	6

Semifinals
1	(France) E Cascino (Czech Republic) A Dețiuc	1	2
(North Macedonia) L Gjorcheska (Switzerland) J Teichmann	6	6
(Italy) N Brancaccio (Spain) L Romero Gormaz	7	6^{4}	[10]
2	(Czech Republic) J Malečková (Czech Republic) M Škoch	5	7^{7}	[6]

Final
(North Macedonia) L Gjorcheska (Switzerland) J Teichmann	7	5	[7]
(Italy) N Brancaccio (Spain) L Romero Gormaz	5	7	[10]
