= 2025 Rio Ladies Open – Doubles =

Doubles
- 2025 Rio Ladies Open

Final
- Champions: (Spain) Leyre Romero Gormaz (Croatia) Tara Würth
- Runners-up: (Spain) Irene Burillo (Georgia (country)) Ekaterine Gorgodze
- Score: 6–4, 6–1

Events
Singles	Doubles
- Rio Ladies Open

This was the first edition of the tournament.

Leyre Romero Gormaz and Tara Würth won the title, defeating Irene Burillo and Ekaterine Gorgodze 6–4, 6–1 in the final.

== Seeds ==
1. (Brazil) Ingrid Martins / (Brazil) Laura Pigossi (semifinals)
2. (Hungary) Panna Udvardy / (Switzerland) Simona Waltert (quarterfinals)
3. (Spain) Leyre Romero Gormaz / (Croatia) Tara Würth (champions)
4. (Spain) Irene Burillo / (Georgia (country)) Ekaterine Gorgodze (final)

== Draw ==
Key

- Q = Qualifier
- WC = Wild card
- LL = Lucky loser
- Alt = Alternate
- ITF = ITF entry
- PR = Protected ranking
- SR = Special ranking
- SE = Special exempt
- JE = Junior exempt
- JR = Junior Accelerator Programme entrant
- CO = College Accelerator Programme entrant
- NG = Next Gen Accelerator Program entrant
- w/o = Walkover
- r = Retired
- d = Defaulted

=== Draw ===
First round
1	(Brazil) I Martins (Brazil) L Pigossi	6	6
WC	(Brazil) S da Cruz Mendonça (Brazil) L Garcia Vidal	1	1
(France) C Monnet (Burundi) S Nahimana	6	6
(Brazil) C Alves (Brazil) G Cé	1	3
3	(Spain) L Romero Gormaz (Croatia) T Würth	6	6
(United States) A Zamarripa (United States) M Zamarripa	4	2
(Argentina) J Ortenzi (Colombia) MP Pérez	1	3
(Brazil) A Candiotto (Argentina) J Riera	6	6
(Venezuela) A Gámiz (Netherlands) E Vedder	5	6	[8]
(Brazil) L Fullana (Brazil) TG Pedretti	7	3	[10]
(Brazil) J Konishi Camargo Silva (Brazil) R Pereira	3	2
4	(Spain) I Burillo (Georgia (country)) E Gorgodze	6	6
(Australia) T Smith (Italy) M Tona	6	6
(Italy) M Colmegna (France) A Ramé	0	1
(Austria) J Grabher (Austria) S Kraus	6	0	[9]
2	(Hungary) P Udvardy (Switzerland) S Waltert	4	6	[11]

Quarterfinals
1	(Brazil) I Martins (Brazil) L Pigossi	6	5	[10]
(France) C Monnet (Burundi) S Nahimana	2	7	[8]
3	(Spain) L Romero Gormaz (Croatia) T Würth	6	7^{7}
(Brazil) A Candiotto (Argentina) J Riera	0	6^{5}
(Brazil) L Fullana (Brazil) TG Pedretti	1	4
4	(Spain) I Burillo (Georgia (country)) E Gorgodze	6	6
(Australia) T Smith (Italy) M Tona	3	7	[10]
2	(Hungary) P Udvardy (Switzerland) S Waltert	6	5	[3]

Semifinals
1	(Brazil) I Martins (Brazil) L Pigossi	5	4
3	(Spain) L Romero Gormaz (Croatia) T Würth	7	6
4	(Spain) I Burillo (Georgia (country)) E Gorgodze	7	6
(Australia) T Smith (Italy) M Tona	5	4

Final
3	(Spain) L Romero Gormaz (Croatia) T Würth	6	6
4	(Spain) I Burillo (Georgia (country)) E Gorgodze	4	1
