= 2024 Billie Jean King Cup qualifying round =

Subsection of tennis competition

The 2024 Billie Jean King Cup qualifying round was held from 12 to 13 April 2024. The eight winners of this round qualified for the 2024 Finals.

== Teams ==
Sixteen teams played for eight spots in the Finals, in series decided on a home and away basis.

These sixteen teams were:

- 8 teams ranked 3rd–12th in the 2023 Finals except Czech Republic and Spain
- 8 winning teams from the 2023 Play-offs

The eight winning teams from the qualifying round played at the 2024 Finals and the eight losing teams played at the 2024 Play-offs.

#: Nations Ranking as of 13 November 2023.

Qualified teams

Seeded teams

1. Australia (#2)
2. Switzerland (#3)
3. France (#6)
4. United States (#8)
5. Kazakhstan (#9)
6. Germany (#10)
7. Slovakia (#11)
8. Romania (#12)

Unseeded teams

- Belgium (#13)
- Slovenia (#14)
- Great Britain (#15)
- Brazil (#16)
- Poland (#17)
- Ukraine (#18)
- Mexico (#19)
- Japan (#20)

== Results summary ==
Home team	Score	Away team	Location	Venue	Surface
Australia [1]	4–0	Mexico	Brisbane	Pat Rafter Arena	Hard
Switzerland [2]	0–4	Poland	Biel/Bienne	Swiss Tennis Arena	Hard (i)
France [3]	1–3	Great Britain	Le Portel	Le Chaudron	Clay (i)
United States [4]	4–0	Belgium	Orlando	USTA National Campus	Hard
Japan	3–1	Kazakhstan [5]	Tokyo	Ariake Coliseum	Hard (i)
Brazil	1–3	Germany [6]	São Paulo	Ginásio do Ibirapuera	Clay (i)
Slovakia [7]	4–0	Slovenia	Bratislava	NTC Arena	Hard (i)
Ukraine	2–3	Romania [8]	Fernandina Beach (USA)	Racquet Park Drive	Clay (green)

== Results ==
=== Australia vs. Mexico ===
Australia
4
Pat Rafter Arena, Brisbane, Australia
12–13 April 2024
Hard

Mexico
0

			1	2	3
1	(Australia) (Mexico)	Arina Rodionova; Giuliana Olmos	3; 6	6; 3	6; 1
2	(Australia) (Mexico)	Daria Saville; Marcela Zacarías	6; 1	6; 0
3	(Australia) (Mexico)	Taylah Preston; Marcela Zacarías	6; 1	6; 1
4	(Australia) (Mexico)	Daria Saville; Giuliana Olmos				not played
5	(Australia) (Mexico)	Ellen Perez / Daria Saville; Jéssica Hinojosa Gómez / María Fernanda Navarro Oliva	6; 3	6; 1

=== Switzerland vs. Poland ===
Switzerland
0
Swiss Tennis Arena, Biel/Bienne, Switzerland
12–13 April 2024
Hard (i)

Poland
4

			1	2	3
1	(Switzerland) (Poland)	Simona Waltert; Iga Świątek	3; 6	1; 6
2	(Switzerland) (Poland)	Céline Naef; Magdalena Fręch	7^{10} 6^{8}	5; 7	3; 6
3	(Switzerland) (Poland)	Céline Naef; Iga Świątek	4; 6	3; 6
4	(Switzerland) (Poland)	Simona Waltert; Magdalena Fręch				not played
5	(Switzerland) (Poland)	Jil Teichmann / Simona Waltert; Maja Chwalińska / Katarzyna Kawa	5; 7	1; 6

=== France vs. Great Britain ===
France
1
Le Chaudron, Le Portel, France
12–13 April 2024
Clay (i)

Great Britain
3

			1	2	3
1	(France) (United Kingdom)	Diane Parry; Katie Boulter	6; 2	6; 0
2	(France) (United Kingdom)	Caroline Garcia; Emma Raducanu	6; 3	3; 6	2; 6
3	(France) (United Kingdom)	Clara Burel; Katie Boulter	5; 7	0; 6
4	(France) (United Kingdom)	Diane Parry; Emma Raducanu	6; 4	1; 6	6^{1} 7^{7}
5	(France) (United Kingdom)	Caroline Garcia / Kristina Mladenovic; Harriet Dart / Heather Watson				not played

=== United States vs. Belgium ===
United States
4
USTA National Campus, Orlando, United States
12–13 April 2024
Hard

Belgium
0

			1	2	3
1	(United States) (Belgium)	Jessica Pegula; Sofia Costoulas	4; 6	6; 2	6; 3
2	(United States) (Belgium)	Emma Navarro; Hanne Vandewinkel	4; 6	6; 4	6; 3
3	(United States) (Belgium)	Jessica Pegula; Hanne Vandewinkel	6; 2	6; 0
4	(United States) (Belgium)	Emma Navarro; Sofia Costoulas				not played
5	(United States) (Belgium)	Caroline Dolehide / Taylor Townsend; Marie Benoît / Kimberley Zimmermann	6; 3	6; 1

=== Japan vs. Kazakhstan ===
Japan
3
Ariake Coliseum, Tokyo, Japan
12–13 April 2024
Hard (i)

Kazakhstan
1

			1	2	3
1	(Japan) (Kazakhstan)	Nao Hibino; Anna Danilina	6; 1	6; 0
2	(Japan) (Kazakhstan)	Naomi Osaka; Yulia Putintseva	6; 2	7^{7} 6^{5}
3	(Japan) (Kazakhstan)	Nao Hibino; Yulia Putintseva	6; 4	3; 6	7^{9} 6^{7}
4	(Japan) (Kazakhstan)	Naomi Osaka; Anna Danilina				not played
5	(Japan) (Kazakhstan)	Shuko Aoyama / Ena Shibahara; Anna Danilina / Zhibek Kulambayeva	6^{7} 7^{9}	6; 3	9; 11

=== Brazil vs. Germany ===
Brazil
1
Ginásio do Ibirapuera, São Paulo, Brazil
12–13 April 2024
Clay (i)

Germany
3

			1	2	3
1	(Brazil) (Germany)	Beatriz Haddad Maia; Laura Siegemund	4; 6	2; 6
2	(Brazil) (Germany)	Laura Pigossi; Tatjana Maria	6; 2	4; 6	4; 6
3	(Brazil) (Germany)	Beatriz Haddad Maia; Anna-Lena Friedsam	5; 7	6; 0	6; 1
4	(Brazil) (Germany)	Carolina Alves; Laura Siegemund	1; 6	6; 2	3; 6
5	(Brazil) (Germany)	Beatriz Haddad Maia / Luisa Stefani; Anna-Lena Friedsam / Angelique Kerber				not played

=== Slovakia vs. Slovenia ===
Slovakia
4
NTC Arena, Bratislava, Slovakia
12–13 April 2024
Hard (i)

Slovenia
0

			1	2	3
1	(Slovakia) (Slovenia)	Anna Karolína Schmiedlová; Ela Nala Milić	6; 4	6; 3
2	(Slovakia) (Slovenia)	Viktória Hrunčáková; Veronika Erjavec	6; 1	5; 7	6; 3
3	(Slovakia) (Slovenia)	Renáta Jamrichová; Veronika Erjavec	6; 2	6; 0
4	(Slovakia) (Slovenia)	Viktória Hrunčáková; Ela Nala Milić				not played
5	(Slovakia) (Slovenia)	Viktória Hrunčáková / Tereza Mihalíková; Pia Lovrič / Ela Nala Milić	6; 1	2; 6	10; 6

=== Ukraine vs. Romania ===
Ukraine
2
Racquet Park Drive, Fernandina Beach, United States
12–13 April 2024
Clay (green)

Romania
3

			1	2	3
1	(Ukraine) (Romania)	Lesia Tsurenko; Ana Bogdan	3; 6	6; 2	6; 0
2	(Ukraine) (Romania)	Elina Svitolina; Jaqueline Cristian	6; 3	7; 5
3	(Ukraine) (Romania)	Elina Svitolina; Ana Bogdan	4; 6	6; 4	3; 6
4	(Ukraine) (Romania)	Lesia Tsurenko; Jaqueline Cristian	6; 2	4; 6	4; 6
5	(Ukraine) (Romania)	Lyudmyla Kichenok / Nadiia Kichenok; Ana Bogdan / Jaqueline Cristian	2; 6	6^{7} 7^{9}
