= 2024 Zavarovalnica Sava Ljubljana – Singles =

Singles
- 2024 Zavarovalnica Sava Ljubljana

Final
- Champion: (Switzerland) Jil Teichmann
- Runner-up: (Spain) Nuria Párrizas Díaz
- Score: 7–6^{(10–8)}, 6–4

Details
- Draw: 32 (4 WC)
- Seeds: 8

Events
Singles	Doubles
← 2023 ·	BMW Ljubljana Open	· 2025 →

Jil Teichmann won the title, defeating Nuria Párrizas Díaz in the final, 7–6^{(10–8)}, 6–4.

Marina Bassols Ribera was the reigning champion, but chose to compete in Monastir instead.

== Seeds ==
1. (France) Chloé Paquet (first round)
2. (Spain) Nuria Párrizas Díaz (final)
3. (Serbia) Olga Danilović (semifinals)
4. (Czech Republic) Sára Bejlek (second round)
5. (Germany) Ella Seidel (quarterfinals)
6. (Brazil) Laura Pigossi (first round)
7. (Croatia) Lea Bošković (first round)
8. Polina Kudermetova (second round)

== Draw ==
=== Key ===
- Q = Qualifier
- WC = Wild card
- LL = Lucky loser
- Alt = Alternate
- SE = Special exempt
- PR = Protected ranking
- ITF = ITF entry
- JE = Junior exempt
- w/o = Walkover
- r = Retired
- d = Defaulted
- SR = Special ranking

=== Finals ===
Semifinals
(United Kingdom) Francesca Jones	6	4	1
(Switzerland) Jil Teichmann	2	6	6
3	(Serbia) Olga Danilović	5	4
2	(Spain) Nuria Párrizas Díaz	7	6

Final
(Switzerland) Jil Teichmann	7^{10}	6
2	(Spain) Nuria Párrizas Díaz	6^{8}	4

=== Top half ===
First round
1	(France) C Paquet	2	3
(United Kingdom) F Jones	6	6
SE	(Croatia) P Marčinko	6	6
(Croatia) T Würth	1	3
(Slovenia) V Erjavec	4	6	5
(Italy) M Paoletti	6	4	7
(Andorra) V Jiménez Kasintseva	6	6
7	(Croatia) L Bošković	1	3
4	(Czech Republic) S Bejlek	7	6
(Spain) L Romero Gormaz	5	1
WC	K Dmitruk	6	5	6
(Croatia) T Lukas	2	7	2
(Switzerland) J Teichmann	6	2	7^{7}
LL	(Switzerland) S Bandecchi	4	6	6^{4}
(North Macedonia) L Gjorcheska	1	2
8	P Kudermetova	6	6

Second round
(United Kingdom) F Jones	7	6
SE	(Croatia) P Marčinko	5	1
(Italy) M Paoletti	5	1
(Andorra) V Jiménez Kasintseva	7	6
4	(Czech Republic) S Bejlek	4	3
WC	K Dmitruk	6	6
(Switzerland) J Teichmann	6	6
8	P Kudermetova	3	0

Quarterfinals
(United Kingdom) F Jones	6	6
(Andorra) V Jiménez Kasintseva	3	4
WC	K Dmitruk	7	4	6^{1}
(Switzerland) J Teichmann	5	6	7^{7}

Semifinals
(United Kingdom) F Jones	6	4	1
(Switzerland) J Teichmann	2	6	6

=== Bottom half ===
First round
5	(Germany) E Seidel	6	6
WC	(Slovenia) P Lovrič	2	1
Q	(Spain) Á Fita Boluda	6	5	6
(Ukraine) K Zavatska	0	7	4
(Croatia) L Ćirič Bagarić	4	1
Q	(Austria) S Kraus	6	6
Q	(United States) L Chirico	3	3
3	(Serbia) O Danilović	6	6
6	(Brazil) L Pigossi	4	4
(Italy) N Brancaccio	6	6
WC	(Slovenia) EN Milić	2	5
(Ukraine) A Sobolieva	6	7
WC	(Slovenia) Ž Falkner	4	7	5
Q	(Turkey) İ Öz	6	5	7
(Slovakia) V Hrunčáková	1	4
2	(Spain) N Párrizas Díaz	6	6

Second round
5	(Germany) E Seidel	4	6	6
Q	(Spain) Á Fita Boluda	6	3	1
Q	(Austria) S Kraus	2	2
3	(Serbia) O Danilović	6	6
(Italy) N Brancaccio	7^{8}	6
(Ukraine) A Sobolieva	6^{6}	0
Q	(Turkey) İ Öz	0	1
2	(Spain) N Párrizas Díaz	6	6

Quarterfinals
5	(Germany) E Seidel	6^{8}	3
3	(Serbia) O Danilović	7^{10}	6
(Italy) N Brancaccio	1	5
2	(Spain) N Párrizas Díaz	6	7

Semifinals
3	(Serbia) O Danilović	5	4
2	(Spain) N Párrizas Díaz	7	6

== Qualifying ==
=== Seeds ===
1. (United States) Louisa Chirico (qualified)
2. (Turkey) İpek Öz (qualified)
3. (Austria) Sinja Kraus (qualified)
4. (Spain) Ángela Fita Boluda (qualified)

=== Qualifiers ===
1. (United States) Louisa Chirico
2. (Turkey) İpek Öz
3. (Switzerland) Sinja Kraus
4. (Spain) Ángela Fita Boluda

=== Lucky loser ===
1. (Switzerland) Susan Bandecchi

=== Qualifying draw ===
==== First qualifier ====
Qualifying competition
1	(United States) Louisa Chirico	7	0	6
	(Switzerland) Susan Bandecchi	5	6	2

==== Second qualifier ====
Qualifying competition
2	(Turkey) İpek Öz	6	6
	(Greece) Sapfo Sakellaridi	4	4

==== Third qualifier ====
Qualifying competition
3	(Austria) Sinja Kraus	6	6
WC	(Slovenia) Zoja Peternel	0	1

==== Fourth qualifier ====
Qualifying competition
4	(Spain) Ángela Fita Boluda	6	6
WC	(Slovenia) Alja Senica	2	3
