= 2025 Zavarovalnica Sava Ljubljana – Singles =

Singles
- 2025 Zavarovalnica Sava Ljubljana

Final
- Champion: (Slovenia) Kaja Juvan
- Runner-up: (Switzerland) Simona Waltert
- Score: 6–4, 6–4

Details
- Draw: 32 (4 WC)
- Seeds: 8

Events
Singles	Doubles
- BMW Ljubljana Open

Jil Teichmann was the reigning champion, but withdrew before the tournament began.

Kaja Juvan won the title, after defeating Simona Waltert 6–4, 6–4 in the final.

== Seeds ==
1. (Switzerland) Simona Waltert (final)
2. (Austria) Sinja Kraus (second round)
3. (Slovenia) Tamara Zidanšek (first round)
4. (Czech Republic) Dominika Šalková (second round)
5. (Slovenia) Kaja Juvan (champion)
6. (Belgium) Hanne Vandewinkel (quarterfinals)
7. (Italy) Nuria Brancaccio (second round)
8. (Poland) Maja Chwalińska (quarterfinals)

== Draw ==
Key

- Q = Qualifier
- WC = Wild card
- LL = Lucky loser
- Alt = Alternate
- ITF = ITF entry
- PR = Protected ranking
- SR = Special ranking
- SE = Special exempt
- JE = Junior exempt
- JR = Junior Accelerator Programme entrant
- CO = College Accelerator Programme entrant
- NG = Next Gen Accelerator Program entrant
- w/o = Walkover
- r = Retired
- d = Defaulted

=== Finals ===
Semifinals
1	(Switzerland) Simona Waltert	6	7
(Slovakia) Renáta Jamrichová	0	5
(Germany) Mona Barthel	4	2
5	(Slovenia) Kaja Juvan	6	6

Final
1	(Switzerland) Simona Waltert	4	4
5	(Slovenia) Kaja Juvan	6	6

=== Top half ===
First round
1	(Switzerland) S Waltert	6	6
WC	D Astakhova	1	4
Q	(Croatia) L Ćirić Bagarić	4	6	0
(Germany) J Niemeier	6	1	6
(Slovenia) D Jakupović	2	7^{7}	6
(Italy) A Zantedeschi	6	6^{5}	4
(Switzerland) L Küng	5	4
8	(Poland) M Chwalińska	7	6
4	(Czech Republic) D Šalková	6	6
WC	(Slovenia) N Radišić	2	0
(Slovakia) R Jamrichová	6	6
WC	(Slovenia) P Lovrič	4	2
WC	(Slovenia) K Novak	6^{3}	1
(Ukraine) A Sobolieva	7^{7}	6
Q	(Czech Republic) A Kučmová	5	7	4
6	(Belgium) H Vandewinkel	7	5	6

Second round
1	(Switzerland) S Waltert	6	0
(Germany) J Niemeier	3	0^{r}
(Slovenia) D Jakupović	6^{4}	2
8	(Poland) M Chwalińska	7^{7}	6
4	(Czech Republic) D Šalková	6	5	6^{2}
(Slovakia) R Jamrichová	0	7	7^{7}
(Ukraine) A Sobolieva	2	0
6	(Belgium) H Vandewinkel	6	6

Quarterfinals
1	(Switzerland) S Waltert	6	1	6
8	(Poland) M Chwalińska	2	6	4
(Slovakia) R Jamrichová	6	7^{7}
6	(Belgium) H Vandewinkel	4	6^{3}

Semifinals
1	(Switzerland) S Waltert	6	7
(Slovakia) R Jamrichová	0	5

=== Bottom half ===
First round
7	(Italy) N Brancaccio	6^{5}	6	6
(Georgia (country)) E Gorgodze	7^{7}	1	3
(Germany) M Barthel	5	6	7
Q	(Turkey) İ Öz	7	4	5
(France) S Janicijevic	1	6	1
Q	(Serbia) T Kostović	6	3	6
(Ukraine) O Oliynykova	6	6
3	(Slovenia) T Zidanšek	3	1
5	(Slovenia) K Juvan	6	6
(Switzerland) V Ryser	1	3
(Italy) G Pedone	2	6	7^{7}
(Czech Republic) B Palicová	6	2	6^{5}
(Hungary) A Tóth	0	6	6
(Croatia) L Bošković	6	2	0
LL	(Italy) S Ambrosio	1	3
2	(Austria) S Kraus	6	6

Second round
7	(Italy) N Brancaccio	7^{9}	4	3
(Germany) M Barthel	6^{7}	6	6
Q	(Serbia) T Kostović	6^{4}	0
(Ukraine) O Oliynykova	7^{7}	6
5	(Slovenia) K Juvan	6	6
(Italy) G Pedone	0	3
(Hungary) A Tóth	6	6
2	(Austria) S Kraus	2	2

Quarterfinals
(Germany) M Barthel	6	6
(Ukraine) O Oliynykova	4	2
5	(Slovenia) K Juvan	6	6
(Hungary) A Tóth	4	1

Semifinals
(Germany) M Barthel	4	2
5	(Slovenia) K Juvan	6	6

== Qualifying ==
=== Seeds ===
1. (Italy) Silvia Ambrosio (qualifying competition, lucky loser)
2. (Serbia) Teodora Kostović (qualified)
3. (Turkey) İpek Öz (qualified)
4. (Sweden) Lisa Zaar (qualifying competition)

=== Qualifiers ===
1. (Czech Republic) Aneta Kučmová
2. (Serbia) Teodora Kostović
3. (Turkey) İpek Öz
4. (Croatia) Lucija Ćirić Bagarić

=== Lucky loser ===
1. (Italy) Silvia Ambrosio

=== Qualifying draw ===
==== First qualifier ====
Qualifying competition
1	(Italy) Silvia Ambrosio	2	6	2
	(Czech Republic) Aneta Kučmová	6	4	6

==== Second qualifier ====
Qualifying competition
2	(Serbia) Teodora Kostović	7^{7}	6
WC	(Slovenia) Alja Senica	6^{1}	2

==== Third qualifier ====
Qualifying competition
3	(Turkey) İpek Öz	6	6
WC	(Slovenia) Nala Kovačič	0	2

==== Fourth qualifier ====
Qualifying competition
4	(Sweden) Lisa Zaar	6^{3}	4
	(Croatia) Lucija Ćirić Bagarić	7^{7}	6
