= 2025 Rio Ladies Open – Singles =

Singles
- 2025 Rio Ladies Open

Final
- Champion: (Switzerland) Simona Waltert
- Runner-up: (France) Alice Ramé
- Score: 7–5, 6–2

Events
Singles	Doubles
- Rio Ladies Open

This was the first edition of the tournament.

Simona Waltert won the title, defeating Alice Ramé 7–5, 6–2 in the final.

== Seeds ==
1. (Switzerland) Simona Waltert (champion)
2. (Hungary) Panna Udvardy (first round)
3. (Austria) Julia Grabher (semifinals)
4. (Argentina) María Lourdes Carlé (first round)
5. (Spain) Leyre Romero Gormaz (first round)
6. (Austria) Sinja Kraus (quarterfinals)
7. (Argentina) Julia Riera (first round)
8. (France) Carole Monnet (first round)

== Draw ==
Key

- Q = Qualifier
- WC = Wild card
- LL = Lucky loser
- Alt = Alternate
- ITF = ITF entry
- PR = Protected ranking
- SR = Special ranking
- SE = Special exempt
- JE = Junior exempt
- JR = Junior Accelerator Programme entrant
- CO = College Accelerator Programme entrant
- NG = Next Gen Accelerator Program entrant
- w/o = Walkover
- r = Retired
- d = Defaulted

=== Finals ===
Semifinals
1	(Switzerland) Simona Waltert	6	6
3	(Austria) Julia Grabher	2	3
(France) Alice Ramé	6	1	6
(Georgia (country)) Ekaterine Gorgodze	2	6	2

Final
1	(Switzerland) Simona Waltert	7	6
(France) Alice Ramé	5	2

=== Top half ===
First round
1	(Switzerland) S Waltert	6	3	6
(Argentina) L Giovannini	2	6	1
WC	(Brazil) L Fullana	6^{4}	2
(Italy) M Tona	7^{7}	6
(Australia) T Smith	3	6	4
(Netherlands) E Vedder	6	3	6
(Croatia) T Würth	6	6
8	(France) C Monnet	1	1
3	(Austria) J Grabher	7^{7}	7^{7}
(Brazil) L Pigossi	6^{5}	6^{2}
WC	(Chile) A Vergara Rivera	6^{2}	4
Q	(Brazil) TG Pedretti	7^{7}	6
Q	(Colombia) MP Pérez	1	1
(Brazil) C Alves	6	6
Q	(Brazil) J Konishi Camargo Silva	0	0
6	(Austria) S Kraus	6	6

Second round
1	(Switzerland) S Waltert	6	6
(Italy) M Tona	2	3
(Netherlands) E Vedder	6^{5}	1
(Croatia) T Würth	7^{7}	6
3	(Austria) J Grabher	6	6
Q	(Brazil) TG Pedretti	4	2
(Brazil) C Alves	4	4
6	(Austria) S Kraus	6	6

Quarterfinals
1	(Switzerland) S Waltert	2	6	7^{7}
(Croatia) T Würth	6	2	6^{4}
3	(Austria) J Grabher	6	5	6
6	(Austria) S Kraus	0	7	3

Semifinals
1	(Switzerland) S Waltert	6	6
3	(Austria) J Grabher	2	3

=== Bottom half ===
First round
7	(Argentina) J Riera	6^{1}	1
(France) A Ramé	7^{7}	6
(Spain) I Burillo	6	6
LL	(Brazil) S da Cruz Mendonça	1	3
Q	(Argentina) M Capurro Taborda	6	6
WC	(Brazil) P Rivoli	1	4
(Italy) M Colmegna	6	6
4	(Argentina) ML Carlé	2	2
5	(Spain) L Romero Gormaz	4	6	1
A Zolotareva	6	0	6
WC	(Brazil) A Candiotto	6	2	6^{3}
(Burundi) S Nahimana	2	6	7^{7}
(Brazil) G Cé	2	7^{7}	6
(Argentina) J Ortenzi	6	6^{4}	4
(Georgia (country)) E Gorgodze	7^{8}	6
2	(Hungary) P Udvardy	6^{6}	3

Second round
(France) A Ramé	6	7
(Spain) I Burillo	3	5
Q	(Argentina) M Capurro Taborda	4	6	0
(Italy) M Colmegna	6	3	6
A Zolotareva	3	3
(Burundi) S Nahimana	6	6
(Brazil) G Cé	2	1
(Georgia (country)) E Gorgodze	6	6

Quarterfinals
(France) A Ramé	4	6	6
(Italy) M Colmegna	6	1	2
(Burundi) S Nahimana	4	1
(Georgia (country)) E Gorgodze	6	6

Semifinals
(France) A Ramé	6	1	6
(Georgia (country)) E Gorgodze	2	6	2

== Qualifying ==
=== Seeds ===
1. (Argentina) Martina Capurro Taborda (qualified)
2. (Brazil) Thaísa Grana Pedretti (qualified)
3. (Argentina) María Florencia Urrutia (qualifying competition, retired)
4. (Brazil) Júlia Konishi Camargo Silva (qualified)

=== Qualifiers ===
1. (Argentina) Martina Capurro Taborda
2. (Brazil) Thaísa Grana Pedretti
3. (Colombia) María Paulina Pérez
4. (Brazil) Júlia Konishi Camargo Silva

=== Lucky loser ===
1. (Brazil) Sofia da Cruz Mendonça

=== Qualifying draw ===
==== First qualifier ====
Qualifying competition
1	(Argentina) Martina Capurro Taborda	6	6
WC	(Brazil) Sofia da Cruz Mendonça	0	2

==== Second qualifier ====
Qualifying competition
2	(Brazil) Thaísa Grana Pedretti	6	6
	(Brazil) Letícia Garcia Vidal	0	1

==== Third qualifier ====
Qualifying competition
3	(Argentina) María Florencia Urrutia	5^{r}
	(Colombia) María Paulina Pérez	4

==== Fourth qualifier ====
Qualifying competition
4/WC	(Brazil) Júlia Konishi Camargo Silva	6	6
WC	(Brazil) Rebeca Pereira	3	1
