= 2025 Zavarovalnica Sava Ljubljana – Doubles =

Doubles
- 2025 Zavarovalnica Sava Ljubljana

Final
- Champions: (Czech Republic) Miriam Škoch (Switzerland) Simona Waltert
- Runners-up: (Slovenia) Dalila Jakupović (Slovenia) Nika Radišić
- Score: 6–2, 6–2

Events
Singles	Doubles
- BMW Ljubljana Open

Nuria Brancaccio and Leyre Romero Gormaz were the reigning champions, but Romero Gormaz did not participate this year. Brancaccio partnered Tamara Zidanšek, but lost in the first round to Jule Niemeier and İpek Öz.

Miriam Škoch and Simona Waltert won the title, after defeating Dalila Jakupović and Nika Radišić 6–2, 6–2 in the final.

== Seeds ==
1. (Czech Republic) Miriam Škoch / (Switzerland) Simona Waltert (champions)
2. Amina Anshba / (United Kingdom) Eden Silva (semifinals)
3. (Czech Republic) Aneta Kučmová / (Sweden) Lisa Zaar (withdrew)
4. (United Kingdom) Freya Christie / (Bosnia and Herzegovina) Anita Wagner (first round)

== Draw ==
Key

- Q = Qualifier
- WC = Wild card
- LL = Lucky loser
- Alt = Alternate
- ITF = ITF entry
- PR = Protected ranking
- SR = Special ranking
- SE = Special exempt
- JE = Junior exempt
- JR = Junior Accelerator Programme entrant
- CO = College Accelerator Programme entrant
- NG = Next Gen Accelerator Program entrant
- w/o = Walkover
- r = Retired
- d = Defaulted

=== Draw ===
First round
1	(Czech Republic) M Škoch (Switzerland) S Waltert	6	4	[10]
(Ukraine) A Sobolieva (Hungary) A Tóth	1	6	[7]
(Italy) S Ambrosio (Italy) A Zantedeschi	3	6	[10]
(Georgia (country)) E Gorgodze (Australia) A Osborne	6	3	[7]
3	(Czech Republic) A Kučmová (Sweden) L Zaar
(Germany) A Fomina-Klotz (Italy) G Pedone	w/o
(Slovenia) K Juvan (Slovenia) K Novak	6	6
WC	(Slovenia) N Kovačič (Slovenia) A Senica	4	1
(Germany) J Niemeier (Turkey) İ Öz	6	6
(Italy) N Brancaccio (Slovenia) T Zidanšek	2	4
(Slovenia) D Jakupović (Slovenia) N Radišić	6	6
4	(United Kingdom) F Christie (Bosnia and Herzegovina) A Wagner	2	2
(Austria) S Kraus (Czech Republic) D Šalková	5	5
(Czech Republic) M Bayerlová (Czech Republic) I Šebestova	7	7
(Switzerland) L Küng (India) V Shinde	3	5
2	A Anshba (United Kingdom) E Silva	6	7

Quarterfinals
1	(Czech Republic) M Škoch (Switzerland) S Waltert	7^{7}	6
(Italy) S Ambrosio (Italy) A Zantedeschi	6^{1}	3
(Germany) A Fomina-Klotz (Italy) G Pedone	0	2
(Slovenia) K Juvan (Slovenia) K Novak	6	6
(Germany) J Niemeier (Turkey) İ Öz
(Slovenia) D Jakupović (Slovenia) N Radišić	w/o
(Czech Republic) M Bayerlová (Czech Republic) I Šebestova	4	3
2	A Anshba (United Kingdom) E Silva	6	6

Semifinals
1	(Czech Republic) M Škoch (Switzerland) S Waltert	4	6	[10]
(Slovenia) K Juvan (Slovenia) K Novak	6	3	[8]
(Slovenia) D Jakupović (Slovenia) N Radišić	6	6
2	A Anshba (United Kingdom) E Silva	0	1

Final
1	(Czech Republic) M Škoch (Switzerland) S Waltert	6	6
(Slovenia) D Jakupović (Slovenia) N Radišić	2	2
