= Jil Teichmann =

Swiss tennis player (born 1997)

- Teichmann at the 2026 Wimbledon Championships
- Full name: Jil Belén Teichmann
- Country (sports): Switzerland
- Residence: Biel/Bienne, Switzerland
- Born: 15 July 1997 (age 29) Barcelona, Spain
- Height: 1.70 m (5 ft 7 in)
- Plays: Left-handed (two-handed backhand)
- Coach: Arantxa Parra Santonja (2019–present)
- Prize money: $4,566,489

Singles
- Career record: 358–267
- Career titles: 2
- Highest ranking: No. 21 (11 July 2022)
- Current ranking: No. 168 (26 October 2026)

Grand Slam singles results
- Australian Open: 2R (2022, 2023)
- French Open: 4R (2022, 2026)
- Wimbledon: 1R (2019, 2021, 2022, 2023, 2025)
- US Open: 2R (2018, 2021)

Doubles
- Career record: 117–85
- Career titles: 2
- Highest ranking: No. 73 (20 June 2022)

Grand Slam doubles results
- Australian Open: 2R (2023)
- French Open: 2R (2020, 2022)
- US Open: 2R (2019)

Team competitions
- Fed Cup: W (2022) record: 11–8
Medal record
Representing (International Olympic Committee) Mixed-NOCs
Youth Olympic Games
Gold medal – first place	2014 Nanjing	Mixed doubles
- Last updated on: 26 October 2026.

Jil Belén Teichmann (born 15 July 1997) is a Swiss professional tennis player. She has been ranked by the WTA as high as No. 21 in singles and No. 73 in doubles.

Teichmann has won two titles in singles and two in doubles on the WTA Tour, along with two WTA 125 singles and one doubles titles. In addition, she won six singles titles and five doubles titles on the ITF World Tour.

A former junior world No. 3, Teichmann won a major title in girls' doubles at the 2014 US Open. That year, she also won a gold medal for Switzerland in mixed doubles at the Summer Youth Olympics in Nanjing.

Her breakthrough as a senior player came in May 2019 when she won her first WTA Tour title in Prague. In July of that year, she won another WTA tournament, after making her first top-10 win over Kiki Bertens. She continued progressing, in March 2021 reaching the semifinals of the WTA 1000 Dubai Championships. With these performances she entered the top 50. Later that year, she reached the final of the Cincinnati Open, a WTA 1000 event, defeating Naomi Osaka, Belinda Bencic, and Karolína Plíšková, before falling to world No. 1, Ashleigh Barty.

== Personal life and background ==
Jil Teichmann was born on 15 July 1997 to mother Regula and father Jacques. She was born and raised in Barcelona, but her parents are from Zürich. Despite being born in Barcelona, Teichmann does not have a Spanish passport. In her youth, she tried various sports but then decided to play tennis on the professional level. She speaks five different languages: German, Spanish, English, French, and Catalan.

== Juniors ==
Teichmann is former junior world No. 3 player. She made her debut on the ITF Junior Circuit in February 2011 at the Grade-4 Swiss Junior Trophy, where she reached the final in doubles. In September 2011, she won her first junior title at the Grade-5 Luzern Junior Competition in singles. In October 2012, she reached the quarterfinals of the Grade A Osaka Mayor's Cup in singles. She won her first doubles title at the Swiss Junior Trophy in February 2013. At her major debut at the 2014 Australian Open, she reached the quarterfinals in doubles. In March 2014, she had success at the Grade-A Campeonato Internacional Juvenil de Tenis de Porto Alegre, winning titles in both singles and doubles.

She then continued with success, winning the title in doubles at the Grade-A Trofeo Bonfiglio, and reached the semifinals in singles. At the 2014 Wimbledon, she also reached the semifinals in doubles. In July 2014, she reached singles quarterfinals and doubles semifinals of the European Junior Championships. She then won the 2014 US Open girls' doubles title along with İpek Soylu, defeating Vera Lapko and Tereza Mihalíková in the final. At the 2015 French Open, she reached quarterfinals in singles and semifinals in doubles. She reached another doubles major quarterfinal in 2015 at Wimbledon and finished her junior career at the 2015 European Junior Championships, where she reached final in singles. As a junior, she won one singles and eight doubles titles in total.

At the 2014 Summer Youth Olympics in China, she won the gold medal in mixed doubles, partnering Jan Zieliński. They defeated Ye Qiuyu of China and Jumpei Yamasaki of Japan in the final.

== Professional ==
=== 2013–2018: First steps ===
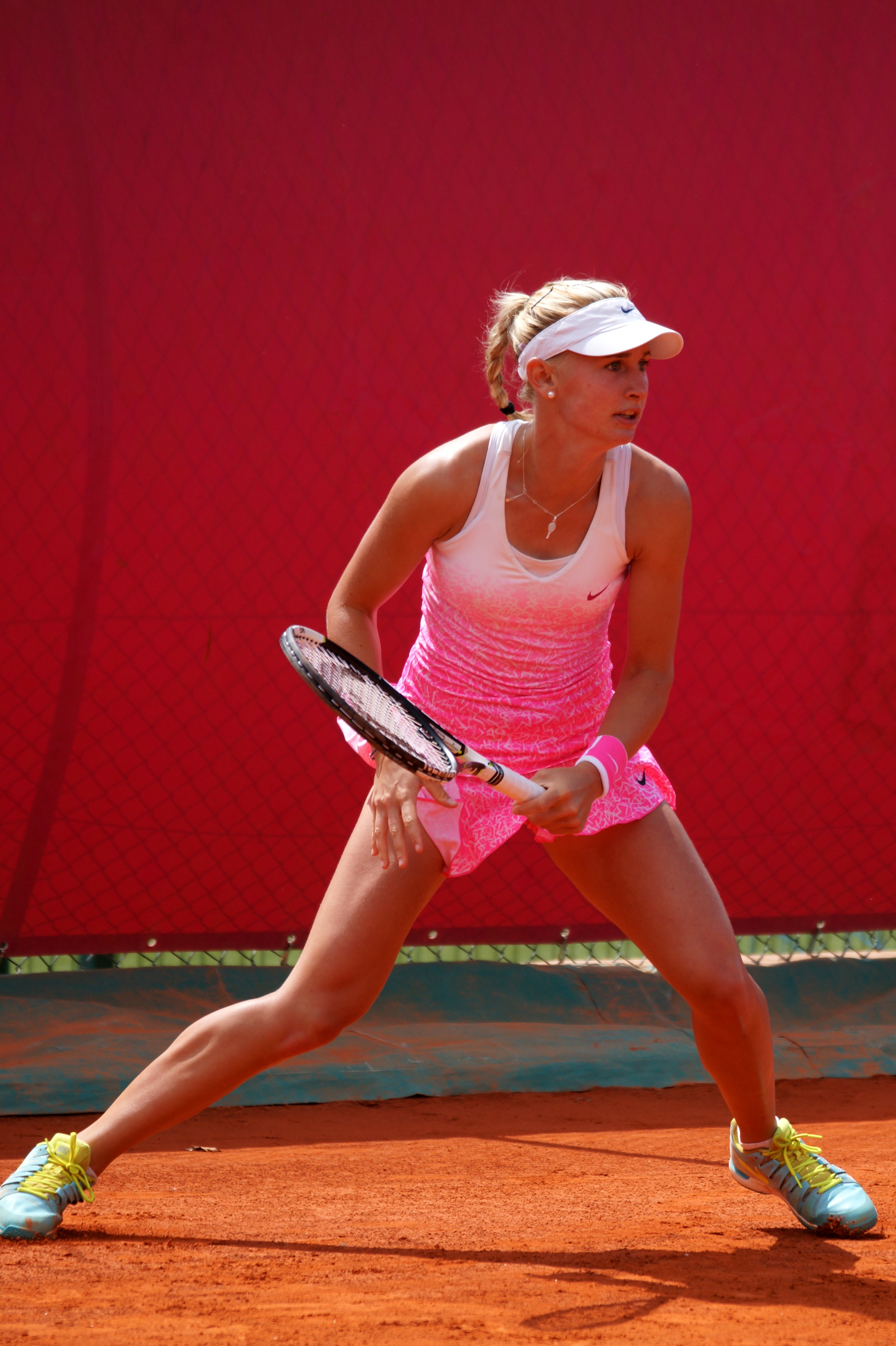
Teichmann in 2015

Teichmann made her debut at the ITF Women's Circuit at the 10k event in Kreuzlingen in February 2013. In June of the same year, she reached her first ITF Circuit semifinal at the Bredeney Ladies Open. Year later, she reached another semifinal, this time at the 25k event in Lenzerheide. In October 2014, she reached her first ITF Circuit final, but lost to Polina Leykina at the 10k event in Sharm El Sheikh. In August 2015, she won her first ITF title at the 15k event in Braunschweig, defeating Ekaterina Alexandrova in the final. In May 2016, she made her WTA Tour debut, playing at the Internationaux de Strasbourg, where she also recorded her first tour match win, defeating Kurumi Nara in the first round. At the 2016 US Open, she made her debut at a major in qualifying, but failed to reach main draw. In May 2017, she finished runner-up at the 100k Open de Cagnes-sur-Mer, losing to Beatriz Haddad Maia in the final. In September, she reached second round of the Premier 5 Wuhan Open, that was her first appearance on that level. At the 2018 US Open, she made her Grand Slam main-draw debut and also recorded her first win on that level.

=== 2019–2020: Two WTA Tour singles titles, top 100 ===
Teichmann won her first WTA Tour singles title when she came through qualifying to win the Prague Open in May 2019, beating Karolína Muchová in the final. The win took her into the top 100 of the WTA rankings. In July, she reached quarterfinals of the Swiss Open, where she lost to Tamara Korpatsch. The following week, she won the Palermo Ladies Open, securing her first top-10 win with a victory over Kiki Bertens in the final. In August 2020, she reached another tour final, but lost to Jennifer Brady at the Lexington Challenger. In September, she reached the quarterfinals of the Internationaux de Strasbourg, where she lost to Elina Svitolina.

=== 2021: WTA 1000 final, four top-10 wins ===
At the Australian Open warm-up event Gippsland Trophy, she lost to Coco Gauff in the first round. Then, at the Australian Open, she was beaten again by Gauff. After these losses, she made progress by getting to the quarterfinals at the Phillip Island Trophy in Melbourne. She defeated three Romanian players in a row, Mihaela Buzărnescu, Monica Niculescu and Patricia Maria Țig, right before she faced a loss against Marie Bouzková.

The following week, Teichmann advanced to her first Premier-level semifinal at Adelaide. On her way, she defeated Kristina Mladenovic, Wang Qiang and Anastasija Sevastova. Eventual champion Iga Świątek prevailed in straight sets in the semifinals.

Her next step was the WTA 1000 event in Dubai. After defeating qualifier Katarina Zavatska in the first round, she upset top-10 player Petra Kvitová and reached her first WTA 1000 third round. She followed this up with a win over Ons Jabeur and then took her revenge against Gauff for the two consecutive losses that year. With the win she entered the semifinals where she faced Barbora Krejčíková, and lost in straight sets. As a result, she reached the top 50 at world No. 41, on 15 March 2021.

At her next tournament, the WTA 1000 Miami Open, she was forced to retire during her first-round match against Paula Badosa. However, she then came to the Madrid Open, starting with an upset over world No. 5, Svitolina, saving six match points. In the following round, she was eliminated by Badosa in three sets.

Ranked 76th at the WTA 1000 Cincinnati Open, Teichmann reached the final as a wildcard player, defeating en-route world No. 2 and second seed, Naomi Osaka, in the round of 16, tenth seed compatriot Belinda Bencic in the quarterfinals, and fifth seed Karolína Plíšková in the semifinals to make the biggest final in her career.

=== 2022: Madrid semifinal, top 25 debut ===
She reached her third career WTA 1000 semifinal at the Madrid Open, following four consecutive straight-set wins over Petra Kvitová, Leylah Fernandez, Elena Rybakina, and Anhelina Kalinina in the quarterfinals. Despite being ousted in the last four by Jessica Pegula, Teichmann entered the top 30 at world No. 29 for the first time following the tournament.

At the Italian Open, she recorded a back-to-back win against Elena Rybakina at the same level as the WTA 1000 Madrid to again reach the quarterfinals in an over three-hours marathon match. It was her 13th career top 20 win, with her 12th coming one day previously over Karolína Plíšková. Teichmann retired due to injury in her last eight match against Daria Kasatkina, but as a result, she secured her top 25 debut at world No. 24, on 16 May 2022.

At the French Open, she had reached the third round, after defeating Olga Danilović in straight sets, for the first time in her career in the eleventh attempt. She went one step further to the fourth round, having never got past the second at a major before, defeating Victoria Azarenka in a three set match lasting three hours and 18 minutes, the longest match thus far. This was her seventh of 14 top-20 wins in 2022. Her run was ended by Sloane Stephens.

Seeded 18th at Wimbledon, Teichmann lost in the first round to Ajla Tomljanović, in straight sets.

=== 2023–2024: Indian Wells third round, second WTA Tour doubles title ===
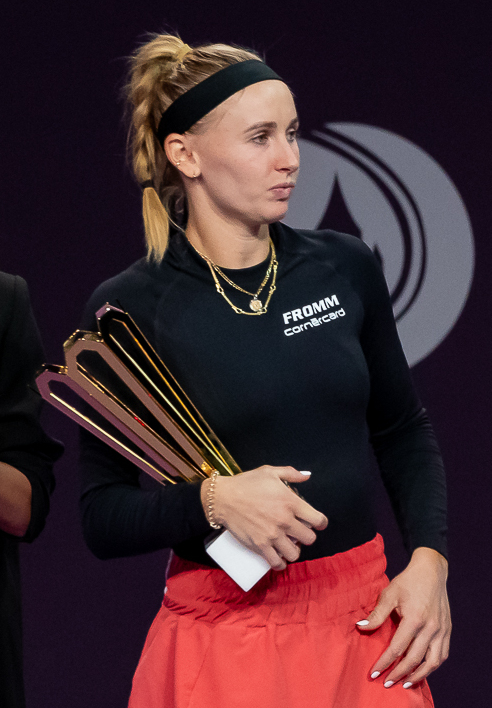
Teichmann at the 2023 Transylvania Open

In March 2023, Teichmann reached the third round in Indian Wells for the first time defeating ninth seed Belinda Bencic in round two, before losing to Rebecca Peterson.

She captured her second WTA Tour doubles title with Jodie Burrage at the 2023 Transylvania Open.

Teichmann won her first WTA 125 title at the 2024 Ljubljana Open defeating Nuria Párrizas Díaz in the final. She also reached the final of this tournament in doubles, partnering Lina Gjorcheska, but they lost to Nuria Brancaccio and Leyre Romero Gormaz.

=== 2025: Iași final ===
Teichmann qualified for the main draw at the Singapore Open and defeated Harriet Dart and Olivia Gadecki to reach the quarterfinals, where she lost to fourth seed Wang Xinyu in three sets.

She won her second WTA 125 title at the Mumbai Open, defeating Mananchaya Sawangkaew in straight sets in the final. Teichmann moved up 17 places to world No. 100 in the rankings following her win on 10 February 2025.

Seeded sixth at the Iași Open, Teichmann defeated wildcard entrant Miriam Bulgaru, Maja Chwalińska, Simona Waltert and Sorana Cîrstea to make it into the final, which she lost to seventh seed Irina-Camelia Begu.

=== 2026: French Open fourth round ===
At the Morocco Open, she recorded wins over Julia Grabher, eighth seed Alycia Parks and wildcard entrant Yasmine Kabbaj to reach the semifinals, where she lost to sixth seed Petra Marčinko.

Teichmann overcame 20th seed Liudmila Samsonova, Magdalena Fręch and 10th seed Karolína Muchová to make it through to the fourth round of the French Open, where her run was ended by eighth seed Mirra Andreeva.

In October at the Guangzhou Open, she defeated fellow Swiss player Simona Waltert and sixth seed Zeynep Sönmez to reach the quarterfinals, at which point she lost to Kaitlin Quevedo.

== Performance timelines ==
Key
W	F	SF	QF	#R	RR	Q#	DNQ	A	NH

(W) winner; (F) finalist; (SF) semifinalist; (QF) quarterfinalist; (#R) rounds 4, 3, 2, 1; (RR) round-robin stage; (Q#) qualification round; (DNQ) did not qualify; (A) absent; (NH) not held; (SR) strike rate (events won / competed); (W–L) win–loss record.
To avoid confusion and double counting, these charts are updated at the conclusion of a tournament or when the player's participation has ended.

Only main-draw results are included in win–loss records.

=== Singles ===
Current through the 2026 Wuhan Open.

Tournament	2016	2017	2018	2019	2020	2021	2022	2023	2024	2025	2026	SR	W–L	Win %
Grand Slam tournaments
Australian Open	A	Q1	Q1	Q1	1R	1R	2R	2R	Q2	Q3	A	0 / 4	2–4	33%
French Open	A	Q3	Q1	Q1	1R	A	4R	1R	Q3	2R	4R	0 / 5	7–5	58%
Wimbledon	A	A	A	1R	NH	1R	1R	1R	Q1	1R	Q2	0 / 5	0–5	0%
US Open	Q1	Q1	2R	1R	1R	2R	1R	Q1	Q2	1R	A	0 / 6	2–6	25%
Win–loss	0–0	0–0	1–1	0–2	0–3	1–3	4–4	1–3	0–0	1–3	3–1	0 / 20	11–20	35%
National representation
Billie Jean King Cup (Note: Formerly known as Fed Cup until 2020.)	A	A	1R	A	F (Note: Edition is split into two years due to COVID-19.)		W	RR	QR	QR		1 / 4	5–3	63%
WTA 1000
Dubai / Qatar Open (Note: The first Premier 5 event of the year has switched back and forth between the Dubai Tennis Championships and the Qatar Ladies Open since 2009. Dubai was classified as a Premier 5 event from 2009 to 2011 before being succeeded by Doha for the 2012–2014 period. In 2015, Dubai regained its Premier 5 status while Doha was demoted to Premier status. The Premier 5 tournaments were reclassified as WTA 1000 tournaments in 2021.)	A	A	A	A	1R	SF	3R	1R	A	A	A	0 / 4	6–4	60%
Indian Wells Open	A	A	Q2	A	NH	2R	1R	3R	A	Q1	A	0 / 3	2–3	40%
Miami Open	A	A	A	A	NH	1R	1R	1R	A	A	A	0 / 3	0–3	0%
Madrid Open	A	A	A	A	NH	2R	SF	2R	A	Q2	A	0 / 3	5–3	63%
Italian Open	A	A	A	A	1R	1R	QF	2R	A	2R (Note: As a lucky loser, Teichmann replaced a player who had a first-round bye. Therefore, she reached the second round without recording a main-draw win.)	Q2	0 / 5	3–5	38%
Canadian Open	A	A	A	A	NH	1R	3R	A	A	A	A	0 / 2	2–2	50%
Cincinnati Open	A	A	A	Q1	2R	F	1R	A	A	A	A	0 / 3	6–3	67%
China Open	A	Q1	A	1R	NH			A	A	A	A	0 / 1	0–1	0%
Wuhan Open	A	2R	Q1	Q1	NH				A	A	A	0 / 1	1–1	50%
Guadalajara Open	NH						1R	A	NMS			0 / 1	0–1	0%
Win–loss	0–0	1–1	0–0	0–1	1–3	10–7	11–8	2–5	0–0	0–1	0–0	0 / 26	25–26	49%
Career statistics
	2016	2017	2018	2019	2020	2021	2022	2023	2024	2025	2026	SR	W–L	Win %
Tournaments	1	3	6	12	12	20	21	16	2	2		Career total: 93		
Titles	0	0	0	2	0	0	0	0	0	0		Career total: 2		
Finals	0	0	0	2	1	1	0	0	0	0		Career total: 4		
Hard win–loss	0–0	1–1	3–4	0–7	9–8	21–14	10–14	6–8	1–1	2–1		0 / 57	53–58	48%
Clay win–loss	1–1	0–2	0–2	12–2	2–3	3–5	11–4	2–6	1–1	0–1		2 / 30	32–27	54%
Grass win–loss	0–0	0–0	0–0	0–1	0–0	0–1	0–3	1–3	0–0	0–1		0 / 9	1–9	10%
Overall win–loss	1–1	1–3	3–6	12–10	11–11	24–20	21–21	9–17	2–2	2–3		2 / 96	86–94	48%
Win %	50%	25%	33%	55%	50%	55%	50%	35%	50%	50%		Career total: 48%		
Year–end ranking (Note: 2013: WTA ranking–789, 2014: WTA ranking–586, 2015: WTA ranking–439.)	221	142	144	71	57	37	35	143	137	126		$3,460,993		

=== Doubles ===
Current through the 2023 Guadalajara Open.

Tournament	2016	2017	2018	2019	2020	2021	2022	2023	SR	W–L	Win %
Grand Slam tournaments
Australian Open	A	A	A	A	1R	1R	1R	2R	0 / 4	1–4	20%
French Open	A	A	A	A	2R	A	2R (Note: Withdrawal during the tournament not counted as a loss.)	A	0 / 2	2–1	67%
Wimbledon	A	A	A	A	NH	A	A	A	0 / 0	0–0	–
US Open	A	A	A	2R	A	1R	1R	A	0 / 3	1–3	25%
Win–loss	0–0	0–0	0–0	1–1	1–2	0–2	1–2	1–1	0 / 9	4–8	33%
WTA 1000 tournaments
Dubai / Qatar Open	A	A	A	A	A	A	A	A	0 / 0	0–0	–
Indian Wells Open	A	A	A	A	NH	1R	A	QF	0 / 2	2–2	50%
Miami Open	A	A	A	A	NH	A	QF	A	0 / 1	2–1	67%
Madrid Open	A	A	A	A	NH	SF	A	A	0 / 1	3–1	75%
Italian Open	A	A	A	A	A	A	1R	A	0 / 1	0–1	0%
Canadian Open	A	A	A	A	NH	A	1R	A	0 / 1	0–1	0%
Cincinnati Open	A	A	A	A	1R	2R	1R	A	0 / 3	1–3	25%
Wuhan Open	A	A	A	A	NH			A	0 / 0	0–0	–
China Open	A	A	A	A	NH			A	0 / 0	0–0	–
Guadalajara Open	NH						1R	A	0 / 1	0–1	0%
Career statistics
Tournaments	3	1	3	5	8	7	11	1	Career total: 39		
Titles	0	0	0	0	0	1	0	0	Career total: 1		
Finals	0	0	0	0	1	1	1	0	Career total: 3		
Hard win–loss	0–0	0–0	0–0	3–4	4–6	4–5	4–9	4–2	0 / 25	19–26	42%
Clay win–loss	0–3	1–1	2–3	1–1	1–2	7–1	1–1	0–0	1 / 14	13–12	52%
Grass win–loss	0–0	0–0	0–0	0–0	0–0	0–0	3–1	0–0	0 / 1	3–1	75%
Overall win–loss	0–3	1–1	2–3	4–5	5–8	11–6	8–11	4–2	1 / 40	35–39	47%
Win %	0%	50%	40%	44%	38%	65%	42%	67%	Career total: 46%		
Year-end ranking	221	298	207	288	166	110	106	136			

== Significant finals ==
=== Olympic medal matches ===
==== Mixed doubles: 1 (gold medal) ====
Outcome	Year	Championship	Surface	Partner	Opponents	Score
Gold	2014	Nanjing Youth Olympics, China	Hard	(Poland) Jan Zieliński	(China) Ye Qiuyu (Japan) Jumpei Yamasaki	4–6, 6–3, [10–5]

=== WTA 1000 tournaments ===
==== Singles: 1 (runner-up) ====
Result	Year	Tournament	Surface	Opponent	Score
Loss	2021	Cincinnati Open	Hard	(Australia) Ashleigh Barty	3–6, 1–6

== WTA Tour finals ==
=== Singles: 5 (2 titles, 3 runner-ups) ===
Legend WTA 1000 (0–1) WTA 500 (0–0) WTA 250 (2–2)	Finals by surface Hard (0–2) Clay (2–1)	Finals by setting Outdoor (2–3)

Result	W–L	Date	Tournament	Tier	Surface	Opponent	Score
Win	1–0	May 2019	Prague Open, Czech Republic	International (Note: WTA International tournaments were reclassified as WTA 250 tournaments in 2021.)	Clay	(Czech Republic) Karolína Muchová	7–6^{(7–5)}, 3–6, 6–4
Win	2–0	Jul 2019	Palermo Ladies Open, Italy	International	Clay	(Netherlands) Kiki Bertens	7–6^{(7–3)}, 6–2
Loss	2–1	Aug 2020	Lexington Challenger, United States	International	Hard	(United States) Jennifer Brady	3–6, 4–6
Loss	2–2	Aug 2021	Cincinnati Open, United States	WTA 1000	Hard	(Australia) Ashleigh Barty	3–6, 1–6
Loss	2–3	Jul 2025	Iași Open, Romania	WTA 250	Clay	(Romania) Irina-Camelia Begu	0–6, 5–7

=== Doubles: 4 (2 titles, 2 runner-ups) ===
Legend WTA 1000 WTA 500 (0–1) WTA 250 (2–1)	Finals by surface Hard (1–1) Clay (1–0) Grass (0–1)	Finals by setting Outdoor (1–2) Indoor (1–0)

Result	W–L	Date	Tournament	Tier	Surface	Partner	Opponents	Score
Loss	0–1	Aug 2020	Lexington Challenger, United States	International	Hard	(Czech Republic) Marie Bouzková	(United States) Hayley Carter (Brazil) Luisa Stefani	1–6, 5–7
Win	1–1	Jul 2021	Hamburg European Open, Germany	WTA 250	Clay	(Italy) Jasmine Paolini	(Australia) Astra Sharma (Netherlands) Rosalie van der Hoek	6–0, 6–4
Loss	1–2	Jun 2022	Berlin Open, Germany	WTA 500	Grass	(France) Alizé Cornet	(Australia) Storm Sanders (Czech Republic) Kateřina Siniaková	4–6, 3–6
Win	2–2	Oct 2023	Transylvania Open, Romania	WTA 250	Hard (i)	(United Kingdom) Jodie Burrage	(France) Léolia Jeanjean (Ukraine) Valeriya Strakhova	6–1, 6–4

== WTA 125 finals ==
=== Singles: 2 (2 titles) ===
Result	Date	Tournament	Surface	Opponents	Score
Win	Sep 2024	Ljubljana Open, Slovenia	Clay	(Spain) Nuria Párrizas Díaz	7–6^{(10–8)}, 6–4
Win	Feb 2025	Mumbai Open, India	Hard	(Thailand) Mananchaya Sawangkaew	6–3, 6–4

=== Doubles: 2 (1 title, 1 runner-up) ===
Result	Date	Tournament	Surface	Partner	Opponents	Score
Win	Jan 2018	Newport Beach Challenger, United States	Hard	(Japan) Misaki Doi	(United States) Jamie Loeb (Sweden) Rebecca Peterson	7–6^{(7–4)}, 1–6, [10–8]
Loss	Sep 2024	Ljubljana Open, Slovenia	Clay	(North Macedonia) Lina Gjorcheska	(Italy) Nuria Brancaccio (Spain) Leyre Romero Gormaz	7–5, 5–7, [7–10]

== ITF Circuit finals ==
=== Singles: 12 (6 titles, 6 runner-ups) ===
Legend W100 tournaments (0–1) W75 tournaments (0-1) W25 tournaments (4–1) W10/15 tournaments (2–3)	Finals by surface Hard (0–1) Clay (6–5)

Result	W–L	Date	Tournament	Tier	Surface	Opponent	Score
Loss	0–1	Oct 2014	ITF Sharm El Sheikh, Egypt	10k	Hard	(Russia) Polina Leykina	2–6, 0–6
Win	1–1	Aug 2015	ITF Braunschweig, Germany	15k	Clay	(Russia) Ekaterina Alexandrova	6–3, 6–3
Win	2–1	Jun 2016	Open de Montpellier, France	25k+H	Clay	(Paraguay) Montserrat González	6–2, 7–6^{(8–6)}
Win	3–1	Jun 2016	ITF Périgueux, France	25k	Clay	(Spain) Olga Sáez Larra	6–3, 6–3
Win	4–1	Nov 2016	ITF Hammamet, Tunisia	10k	Clay	(Romania) Diana Enache	6–4, 6–4
Loss	4–2	Feb 2017	ITF Cairo, Egypt	15k	Clay	(Slovakia) Chantal Škamlová	6–3, 6–7^{(1–7)}, 1–6
Loss	4–3	Feb 2017	ITF Hammamet, Tunisia	15k	Clay	(Spain) Georgina García Pérez	5–7, 2–6
Win	5–3	Apr 2017	Chiasso Open, Switzerland	25k	Clay	(Liechtenstein) Kathinka von Deichmann	2–6, 6–3, 6–2
Loss	5–4	May 2017	Open de Cagnes-sur-Mer, France	100k	Clay	(Brazil) Beatriz Haddad Maia	3–6, 3–6
Loss	5–5	Jul 2018	ITF Porto, Portugal	25k	Clay	(Spain) Cristina Bucșa	6–7^{(4–7)}, 1–6
Win	6–5	Apr 2019	ITF Pula, Italy	W25	Clay	(Slovenia) Kaja Juvan	7–6^{(7–3)}, 6–0
Loss	6–6	Jun 2024	Internazionali di Caserta, Italy	W75	Clay	(Spain) Leyre Romero Gormaz	2–6, 6–4, 4–6

=== Doubles: 11 (5 titles, 6 runner-ups) ===
Legend $100,000 tournaments (0–1) $25,000 tournaments (2–4) $10/15,000 tournaments (3–1)	Finals by surface Hard (0–3) Clay (5–3)

Result	W–L	Date	Tournament	Tier	Surface	Partner	Opponents	Score
Win	1–0	Aug 2013	ITF Caslano, Switzerland	10,000	Clay	(Switzerland) Chiara Grimm	(Switzerland) Sara Ottomano (Czech Republic) Barbora Štefková	6–4, 4–6, [10–4]
Win	2–0	Apr 2014	Chiasso Open, Switzerland	25,000	Clay	(Switzerland) Chiara Grimm	(Italy) Alice Matteucci (Italy) Camilla Rosatello	7–5, 6–3
Win	3–0	Aug 2015	ITF Leipzig, Germany	15,000	Clay	(Australia) Priscilla Hon	(Austria) Pia König (Switzerland) Conny Perrin	6–1, 6–4
Loss	3–1	Jan 2016	ITF Guarujá, Brazil	25,000	Hard	(Brazil) Laura Pigossi	(Brazil) Paula Cristina Gonçalves (Brazil) Beatriz Haddad Maia	7–6^{(3)}, 5–7, [7–10]
Loss	3–2	Jun 2016	Open de Montpellier, France	25,000	Clay	(Spain) Lourdes Dominguez Lino	(India) Prarthana Thombare (Netherlands) Eva Wacanno	5–7, 6–2, [9–11]
Loss	3–3	Sep 2016	ITF Barcelona, Spain	25,000	Clay	(Italy) Alice Matteucci	(Venezuela) Andrea Gamiz (Spain) Georgina García Pérez	2–6, 5–7
Win	4–3	Oct 2016	ITF Pula, Italy	25,000	Clay	(Slovenia) Tamara Zidanšek	(Italy) Claudia Giovine (Italy) Camilla Rosatello	6–2, 6–4
Loss	4–4	Oct 2016	ITF Sharm El Sheikh, Egypt	10,000	Hard	(Argentina) Guadalupe Pérez Rojas	(Georgia (country)) Mariam Bolkvadze (Ukraine) Alona Fomina	2–6, 3–6
Loss	4–5	Oct 2016	Soho Square Ladies, Egypt	100,000	Hard	(Argentina) Guadalupe Pérez Rojas	(Romania) Irina Bara (Ukraine) Alona Fomina	2–6, 1–6
Win	5–5	Nov 2016	ITF Hammamet, Tunisia	10,000	Clay	(Argentina) Guadalupe Pérez Rojas	(Serbia) Tamara Čurović (Slovakia) Barbara Kotelesová	6–1, 4–6, [11–9]
Loss	5–6	Mar 2017	ITF Curitiba, Brazil	25,000	Clay	(Brazil) Laura Pigossi	(Brazil) Gabriela Cé (Venezuela) Andrea Gámiz	6–4, 2–6, [2–10]

== Junior Grand Slam tournament finals ==
=== Doubles: 1 (title) ===
Result	Year	Tournament	Surface	Partner	Opponents	Score
Win	2014	US Open	Hard	(Turkey) İpek Soylu	(Belarus) Vera Lapko (Slovakia) Tereza Mihalíková	5–7, 6–2, [10–7]

== WTA Tour career earnings ==
Current through the 2022 French Open

Year	Grand Slam singles titles	WTA singles titles	Total singles titles	Earnings ($)	Money list rank
2014	0	0	0	4,305	756
2015	0	0	0	10,832	487
2016	0	0	0	31,280	307
2017	0	0	0	86,108	213
2018	0	0	0	148,980	181
2019	0	2	2	305,603	129
2020	0	0	0	295,876	86
2021	0	0	0	749,904	44
2022	0	0	0	944,517	14
Career	0	2	2	2,594,207	223

== Career Grand Slam statistics ==
=== Seedings ===
Tournaments won by Teichmann are in boldface, and advanced into finals by Teichmann are in italics.

Year	Australian Open	French Open	Wimbledon	US Open
2016	absent	absent	absent	did not qualify
2017	did not qualify	did not qualify	absent	did not qualify
2018	did not qualify	did not qualify	absent	qualifier
2019	did not qualify	did not qualify	not seeded	not seeded
2020	not seeded	not seeded	cancelled	not seeded
2021	not seeded	absent	not seeded	not seeded
2022	not seeded	23rd	18th	30th

=== Best Grand Slam results details ===
Grand Slam tournament winners are in boldface, and runner–ups are in italics.

==== Singles ====
**Australian Open**
**2022 (not seeded)**
Round	Opponent	Rank	Score
1R	**(Croatia)** Petra Martić	57	6–3, 6–3
2R	**(Belarus)** Victoria Azarenka	25	1–6, 2–6

**Wimbledon Championships**
**2019 (not seeded)**
Round	Opponent	Rank	Score
1R	**(Russia)** Anastasia Potapova	71	6–2, 4–6, 1–6
**2021 (not seeded)**
Round	Opponent	Rank	Score
1R	**(Italy)** Camila Giorgi	62	2–6, 2–6
**2022 (18th)**
Round	Opponent	Rank	Score
1R	**(Australia)** Ajla Tomljanović	44	2–6, 3–6

**French Open**
**2022 (23rd)**
Round	Opponent	Rank	Score
1R	(United States) Bernarda Pera	116	6–2, 6–1
2R	**(Serbia)** Olga Danilović	172	6–4, 6–1
3R	**(Belarus)** Victoria Azarenka (15)	15	4–6, 7–5, 7–6
4R	(United States) Sloane Stephens	64	2–6, 0–6

**US Open**
**2018 (qualifier)**
Round	Opponent	Rank	Score
1R	(Slovenia) Dalila Jakupović	91	6–3 6–0
2R	**(Estonia)** Kaia Kanepi	44	4–6, 3–6
**2021 (not seeded)**
Round	Opponent	Rank	Score
1R	(Spain) Cristina Bucșa (Q)	161	6–3, 6–4
2R	**(Estonia)** Anett Kontaveit (28)	28	4–6, 1–6

== Wins against top 10 players ==
- Teichmann has an 8–8 record against players who, at the time the matches were played, were ranked in the top 10.

No.	Player	Rk	Event	Surface	Rd	Score	Rk	Years	Ref
1	(Netherlands) Kiki Bertens	5	Palermo Ladies Open, Italy	Clay	F	7–6^{(7–3)}, 6–2	82	2019	
2	(Czech Republic) Petra Kvitová	10	Dubai Championships, UAE	Hard	2R	6–2, 3–4 ret.	54	2021	
3	(Ukraine) Elina Svitolina	5	Madrid Open, Spain	Clay	1R	2–6, 6–4, 7–6^{(7–5)}	40	2021	
4	(Japan) Naomi Osaka	2	Cincinnati Open, US	Hard	3R	3–6, 6–3, 6–3	76	2021	
5	(Czech Republic) Karolína Plíšková	4	Cincinnati Open, US	Hard	SF	6–2, 6–4	76	2021	
6	(Czech Republic) Karolína Plíšková	6	Italian Open, Italy	Clay	2R	6–2, 4–6, 6–4	29	2022	
7	(Estonia) Anett Kontaveit	2	Canadian Open, Canada	Hard	2R	6–4, 6–4	21	2022	
8	(Switzerland) Belinda Bencic	9	Indian Wells Open, US	Hard	2R	3–6, 6–3, 6–3	39	2023	

- Key: (Rk) first use, opponent rank; (Rd) round; (Rk) 2nd use, player rank; (Ref) reference; (F) final; (SF) semifinal; (QF) quarterfinal; (#R) rounds 4, 3, 2, 1; (RR) round-robin stage; (Q#) qualifying rounds or stages (3), 2, 1.
