= Alice Ramé =

French tennis player

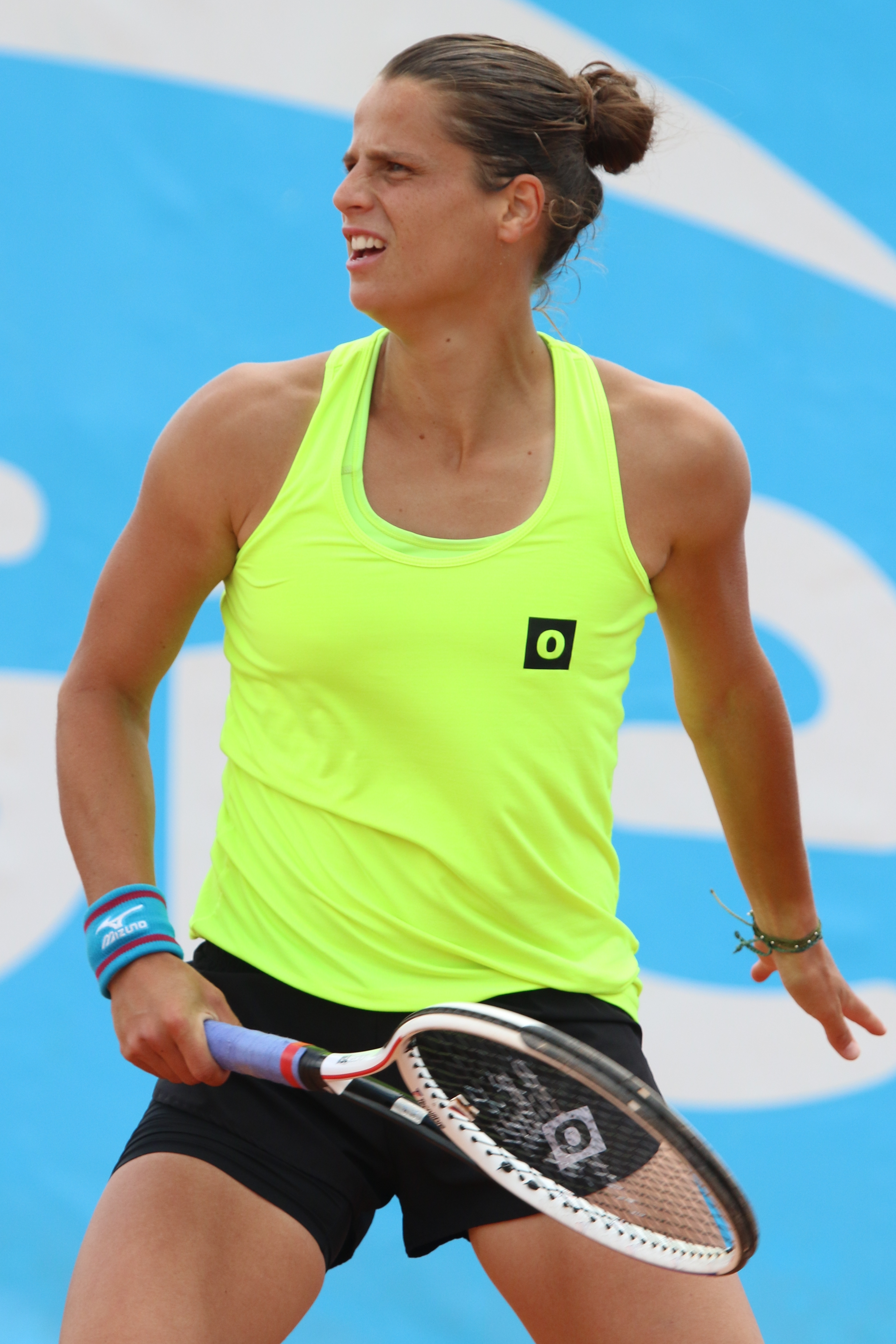
- Ramé 2021
- Country (sports): France
- Born: 9 November 1997 (age 28)
- Plays: Right-handed (one-handed backhand)
- Prize money: $279,428

Singles
- Career record: 389–277
- Career titles: 3 ITF
- Highest ranking: No. 191 (5 January 2026)
- Current ranking: No. 256 (26 October 2026)

Grand Slam singles results
- Australian Open: Q1 (2026)
- French Open: Q1 (2022, 2026)
- Wimbledon: Q1 (2026)

Doubles
- Career record: 46–47
- Career titles: 5 ITF
- Highest ranking: No. 452 (24 September 2018)
- Current ranking: No. 1,258 (26 October 2026)

Grand Slam doubles results
- French Open: 1R (2026)
- Last updated on: 26 October 2026.

Alice Ramé (born 9 November 1997) is a French professional tennis player.

== Personal life ==
She started playing tennis at the age of 5 in England, encouraged by her family. Ramé, who has a one-handed backhand playing style, considers Amélie Mauresmo her idol in tennis. A knee injury she suffered at the age of 19 negatively affected her in the early years of her career.

== Career ==
In September 2017, at the ITF W15 event held in Prague, Czech Republic, she won her first career championship when her Belgian opponent, Magali Kempen, retired in the second set of the final.

In June 2025, she played in the final of the ITF W75 event in Caserta, Italy, losing in three sets to Spanish Andrea Lázaro García.

=== First WTA 125 singles final, French Open doubles wildcard ===
In October 2025, she reached her first WTA 125 singles final in Rio de Janeiro, Brazil, at the Rio Ladies Open. In the final, she lost to the top-seeded Swiss player, Simona Waltert, in two sets.

Having had a good season, Rame wanted to participate in the French Open for the second time, facing Polish player Maja Chwalińska in the qualifiers. She was defeated by her Polish opponent in two sets.

In May 2026, she received a wildcard into in the French Open doubles tournament with her partner Tiphanie Lemaître.

== WTA 125 finals ==
=== Singles: 1 (runner-up) ===
Result	W–L	Date	Tournament	Surface	Opponent	Score
Loss	0–1	Oct 2025	Rio Ladies Open, Brazil	Clay	(Switzerland) Simona Waltert	5–7, 2–6

== ITF Circuit finals ==
=== Singles: 12 (3 titles, 9 runner-ups) ===
Legend W60/75 tournaments W25/35 tournaments W15 tournaments	Finals by surface Clay (3–9)

Result	W–L	Date	Tournament	Tier	Surface	Opponent	Score
Loss	0–1	Jun 2017	ITF De Haan, Belgium	W15	Clay	(Germany) Lisa Ponomar	4–6, 3–6
Win	1–1	Sep 2017	ITF Prague, Czech Republic	W15	Clay	(Belgium) Magali Kempen	6–4, 5–4, ret.
Win	2–1	Dec 2017	ITF Hammamet, Tunisia	W15	Clay	(France) Jade Suvrijn	6–2, 6–4
Loss	2–2	Mar 2018	ITF Campinas, Brazil	W15	Clay	(France) Harmony Tan	2–6, 0–6
Loss	2–3	Jun 2018	ITF Hammamet, Tunisia	W15	Clay	(Greece) Eleni Kordolaimi	1–6, 5–7
Win	3–3	Apr 2019	ITF Tabarka, Tunisia	W15	Clay	(France) Émeline Dartron	6–4, 6–2
Loss	3–4	Jun 2019	ITF Périgueux, France	W25	Clay	(France) Tessah Andrianjafitrimo	7–6^{(5)}, 2–6, 2–6
Loss	3–5	Feb 2020	ITF Monastir, Tunisia	W15	Clay	(Bosnia and Herzegovina) Nefisa Berberović	1–6, 6–3, 3–6
Loss	3–6	Jan 2024	ITF Buenos Aires, Argentina	W35	Clay	(Argentina) Solana Sierra	1–6, 4–6
Loss	3–7	Sep 2024	ITF Reus, Spain	W35	Clay	(Spain) Carlota Martínez Círez	1–6, 6–7^{(4)}
Loss	3–8	Jun 2025	Internazionali di Caserta, Italy	W75	Clay	(Spain) Andrea Lázaro García	6–4, 3–6, 0–6
Loss	3–9	Mar 2026	ITF Santa Margherita di Pula, Italy	W35	Clay	(Bulgaria) Rositsa Dencheva	0–6, 3–6

=== Doubles: 6 (5 titles, 1 runner-up) ===
Legend W25/35 tournaments W15 tournaments	Finals by surface Hard (0–1) Clay (5–0)

Result	W–L	Date	Tournament	Tier	Surface	Partner	Opponents	Score
Loss	0–1	Nov 2014	ITF Équeurdreville-Hainneville, France	W25	Hard (i)	(France) Fanny Caramaro	(Russia) Olga Doroshina (Belarus) Lidziya Marozava	3–6, 3–6
Win	1–1	Jun 2018	ITF Hammamet, Tunisia	W15	Clay	(Greece) Eleni Kordolaimi	(Slovenia) Pia Čuk (Belgium) Eliessa Vanlangendonck	6–3, 6–2
Win	2–1	Jun 2018	ITF Hammamet, Tunisia	W15	Clay	(Greece) Eleni Kordolaimi	(Netherlands) Merel Hoedt (Belgium) Eliessa Vanlangendonck	6–2, 6–2
Win	3–1	Jun 2018	Open de Montpellier, France	W25	Clay	(France) Elixane Lechemia	(Brazil) Carolina Alves (Italy) Martina Colmegna	6–7^{(5)}, 6–2, [10–6]
Win	4–1	Apr 2019	ITF Tabarka, Tunisia	W15	Clay	(Spain) Ángela Fita Boluda	(United States) Sarah Lee (Belgium) Chelsea Vanhoutte	7–5, 6–7^{(5)}, [11–9]
Win	5–1	Feb 2024	ITF Antalya, Turkiye	W35	Clay	(Italy) Martina Colmegna	(Spain) Ángela Fita Boluda (Latvia) Daniela Vismane	3–6, 6–1, [13–11]
