= Ela Nala Milić =

Slovenian tennis player (born 2006)

Ela Milić
- Full name: Ela Nala Milić
- Country (sports): Slovenia
- Born: 28 February 2006 (age 20)
- Plays: Right-handed (two-handed backhand)
- Prize money: US$27,438

Singles
- Career record: 65–73
- Career titles: 0
- Highest ranking: No. 705 (30 December 2024)
- Current ranking: No. 1,088 (27 July 2026)

Grand Slam singles results
- Australian Open Junior: 1R (2023)
- Wimbledon Junior: 2R (2022, 2023)
- US Open Junior: 3R (2023)

Doubles
- Career record: 20–23
- Career titles: 0
- Highest ranking: No. 618 (3 March 2025)
- Current ranking: No. 985 (27 July 2026)

Grand Slam doubles results
- Australian Open Junior: 2R (2023)
- Wimbledon Junior: 1R (2023)
- US Open Junior: QF (2022)

Team competitions
- Fed Cup: 0–4
- Last updated on: 27 July 2026.

Ela Nala Milić (born 28 February 2006) is a Slovenian tennis player.

== Career ==
Milić made her WTA main-draw debut at the 2021 Zavarovalnica Sava Portorož, after receiving a wildcard for the doubles tournament. She and her partner Tina Cvetkovič lost in the first round to third seeds Anna Danilina and Fanny Stollár in two sets.

The next wildcard she received was for the WTA 125 tournament 2023 Zavarovalnica Sava Ljubljana. Milić lost in the first round to third seed Dalma Gálfi in three sets.

In 2024, she played for Slovenia in the Billie Jean King Cup qualifying tie against Slovakia. Milić lost in the opening singles match to Anna Karolína Schmiedlová and, partnering with Pia Lovrič, was also defeated in the dead rubber doubles against Viktória Hrunčáková and Tereza Mihalíková.

She, once again, received a wildcard for the 2024 Zavarovalnica Sava Ljubljana, and once more lost in the first round, this time to Anastasiia Sobolieva in two sets.

== Personal life ==
Milić is the daughter of former basketball player Marko Milič and the granddaughter of former shot putter Vladimir Milić.

== ITF Circuit finals ==
=== Singles: 1 (1 runner–up) ===
Legend W15 tournaments (0–1)	Finals by surface Hard (0–1)

Result	W–L	Date	Tournament	Tier	Surface	Opponents	Score
Loss	0–1	Feb 2026	ITF Sharm El Sheikh, Egypt	W15	Hard	Yuliya Hatouka	2–6, 3–6

=== Doubles: 3 (3 runner–ups) ===
Legend W25/35 tournaments (0–1) W15 tournaments (0–2)	Finals by surface Hard (0–2) Clay (0–1)

Result	W–L	Date	Tournament	Tier	Surface	Partner	Opponents	Score
Loss	0–1	Oct 2023	ITF Heraklion, Greece	W15	Hard	(Czech Republic) Amélie Šmejkalová	(Italy) Matilde Mariani (Italy) Gaia Squarcialupi	6–1, 5–7, [7-10]
Loss	0–2	Aug 2024	ITF Vrnjačka Banja, Serbia	W35	Clay	(Italy) Anna Turati	(Serbia) Natalija Senić (Serbia) Anja Stanković	3–6, 4–6
Loss	0–3	Nov 2024	ITF Monastir, Tunisia	W15	Hard	(Italy) Anna Turati	(Netherlands) Madelief Hageman (Lithuania) Andrė Lukošiūtė	6–4, 0–6, [5–10]

== ITF Junior Circuit finals ==
=== Junior Circuit tournaments ===
Legend
Category G1
Category G4
Category G5

==== Singles: 4 (1 title, 3 runner–ups) ====
Result	W–L	Date	Location	Grade	Surface	Opponent	Score
Win	1–0	Jul 2021	ITF San Marino, San Marino	G5	Clay	(Italy) Emma Rizzetto	6–2, 6–3
Loss	1–1	Aug 2021	ITF Kranj, Slovenia	G4	Clay	(Croatia) Sara Svetac	3–6, 7–6^{(4)}, 4–6
Loss	1–2	Apr 2022	ITF Beaulieu-sur-Mer, France	G1	Clay	(Ukraine) Anastasiya Lopata	3–6, 2–6
Loss	1–3	Jun 2022	ITF Nottingham, Great Britain	G1	Grass	(Australia) Taylah Preston	2–6, 7–6^{(3)}, 3–6

==== Doubles: 1 (runner–up) ====
Result	W–L	Date	Tournament	Grade	Surface	Partner	Opponents	Score
Loss	0–1	Jun 2022	ITF Nottingham, Great Britain	G1	Grass	(Argentina) Lucía Peyre	(Argentina) Luciana Moyano (Peru) Lucciana Pérez Alarcón	2–6, 0–6

=== Billie Jean King Cup ===
==== Doubles (0–2) ====
Legend
Finals (0–2)

Edition	Round	Date	Location	Surface	Partnering	Against	Opponents	W/L	Result
2023	F	Nov 2023	Seville (ESP)	Hard (i)	Veronika Erjavec	Australia	Kimberly Birrell; Storm Hunter	L	5–7, 7–6^{(2)}, [5-10]
2023	F	Nov 2023	Seville (ESP)	Hard (i)	Veronika Erjavec	Kazakhstan	Anna Danilina; Zhibek Kulambayeva	L	6–2, 4–6, [7-10]
