= Simona Waltert =

Swiss tennis player (born 2000)

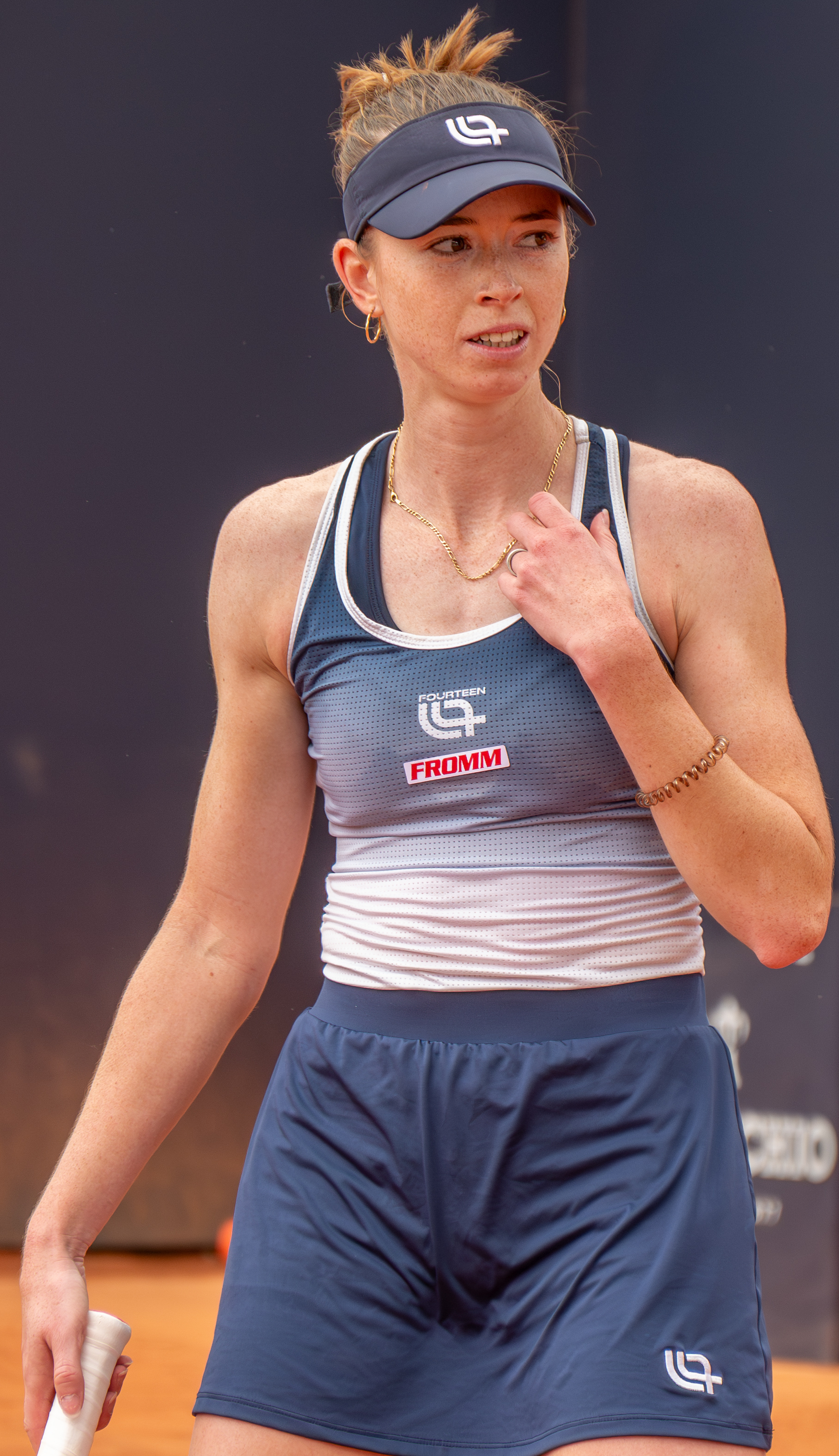
- Waltert at the 2026 Italian Open
- Country (sports): Switzerland
- Born: 13 December 2000 (age 25) Chur, Switzerland
- Height: 1.74 m (5 ft 9 in)
- Plays: Right (two-handed backhand)
- Coach: Stéphane Bohli (2019-)
- Prize money: $1,717,529

Singles
- Career record: 322–223
- Career titles: 1 WTA 125
- Highest ranking: No. 81 (9 February 2026)
- Current ranking: No. 133 (2 November 2026)

Grand Slam singles results
- Australian Open: 1R (2026)
- French Open: 2R (2023)
- Wimbledon: 1R (2023, 2026)
- US Open: 1R (2026)

Doubles
- Career record: 103–61
- Career titles: 2
- Highest ranking: No. 87 (2 February 2026)
- Current ranking: No. 245 (2 November 2026)

Grand Slam doubles results
- Australian Open: 1R (2026)
- Wimbledon: 1R (2026)
- US Open: 1R (2026)

Team competitions
- Fed Cup: W (2022)
- Last updated on: 2 November 2026.

Simona Waltert (born 13 December 2000) is a Swiss professional tennis player. She has a career-high WTA singles ranking of No. 81, achieved on 9 February 2026, and a best doubles ranking of No. 87, achieved on 2 February 2026. Waltert has won two doubles titles on the WTA Tour as well as one WTA 125 singles title and seven in doubles.

== Career ==
=== 2017-2018: Juniors ===
Waltert was a girls' singles semifinalist at the 2017 Wimbledon Championships, losing to eventual runner-up Ann Li. On the ITF Junior Circuit, she had a career-high combined ranking of No. 9, achieved on 22 January 2018.

=== 2019-2023: WTA Tour and major debuts, maiden doubles title ===
Waltert made her WTA Tour main-draw debut at the 2019 Ladies Open Lausanne, where she received a wildcard for the singles and doubles tournaments. She won her first WTA Tour doubles title at the 2021 Ladies Open Lausanne, partnering Susan Bandecchi and defeating Ulrikke Eikeri and Valentini Grammatikopoulou in the final.

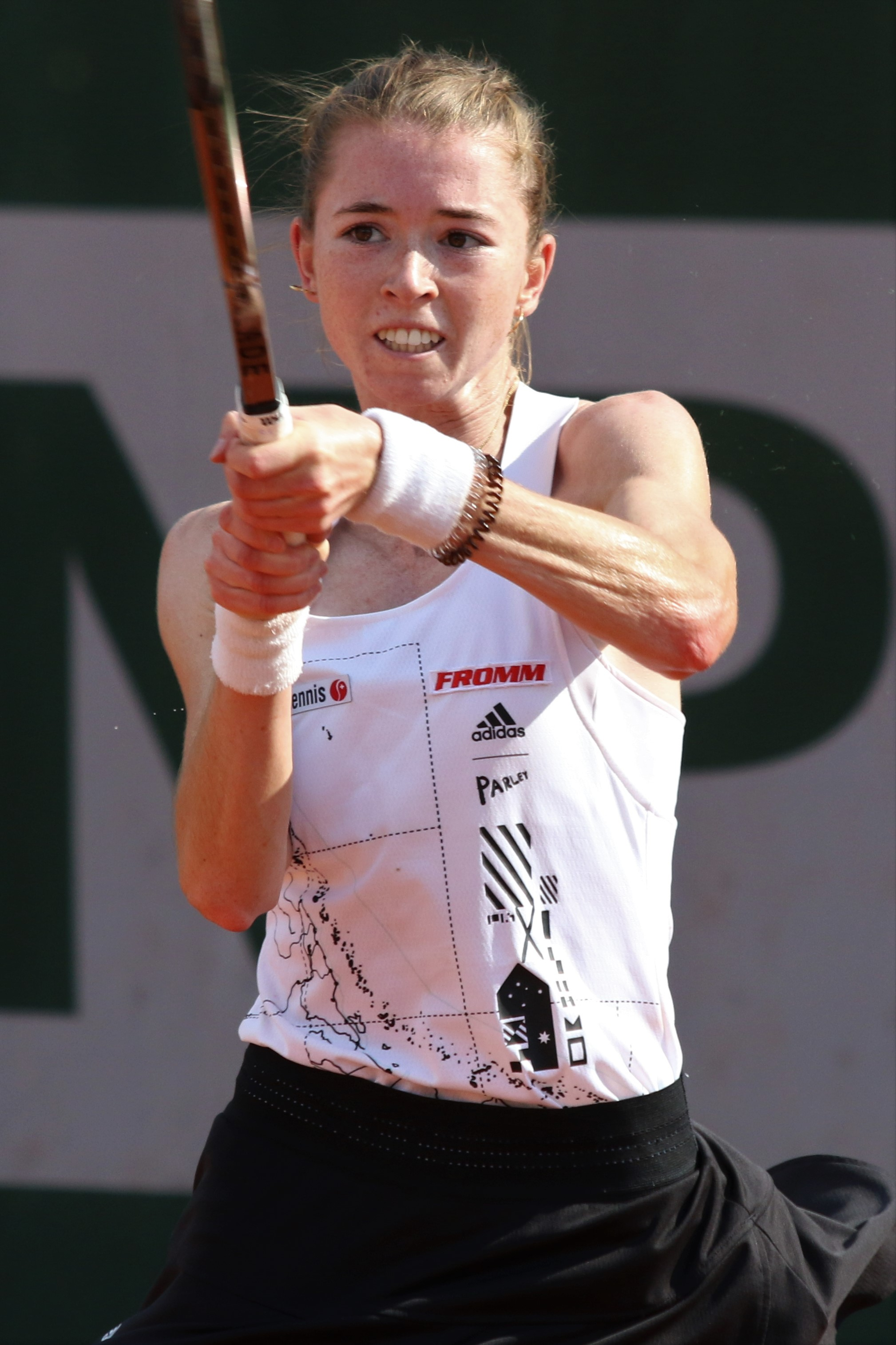
Waltert at the 2022 French Open

At the 2022 Ladies Open Lausanne, Waltert earned her first top-10 win as a wildcard entrant over world No. 7 and top seed, Danielle Collins, saving three match points in the deciding tiebreak. By defeating Cristina Bucsa the second round, she went one step further to reach her first WTA Tour quarterfinal, where she was lost to Olga Danilović. Returning to the ITF Tour, she won the 2022 Bronx Open in doubles with partner Anna Blinkova, defeating Han Na-lae and Hiroko Kuwata in the final.

Waltert made her major debut at the 2023 French Open and won her first match defeating Elizabeth Mandlik, before losing in the second round to Elisabetta Cocciaretto. As a result, she reached a new career-high ranking of No. 107 on 12 June 2023.

=== 2024-2026: First WTA 125 singles title, top 100 ===
Partnering with María Lourdes Carlé, Waltert was runner-up in the doubles at the WTA 125 2024 Montreux Open, losing to Quinn Gleason and Ingrid Martins in the final which went to a deciding champions tiebreak. She reached the top 100 on 6 October 2025, following her first WTA 125 singles final at the Ljubljana Open in Slovenia and the quarterfinals in Rende, Calabria, as well as winning an ITF W100 title in Lisbon.

Waltert won her first WTA 125 singles title at the 2025 Rio Ladies Open, defeating Alice Ramé in the final. She was runner-up at the WTA 125 2026 Swedish Open, losing in the final to Paula Badosa. Partnering with fellow Swiss player Naïma Karamoko, Waltert won her second WTA Tour doubles title at the 2026 Chennai Open, defeating Vaishnavi Adkar and Rutuja Bhosale in the final.

== Performance timeline ==
Key
W	F	SF	QF	#R	RR	Q#	DNQ	A	NH

(W) winner; (F) finalist; (SF) semifinalist; (QF) quarterfinalist; (#R) rounds 4, 3, 2, 1; (RR) round-robin stage; (Q#) qualification round; (DNQ) did not qualify; (A) absent; (NH) not held; (SR) strike rate (events won / competed); (W–L) win–loss record.
To avoid confusion and double counting, these charts are updated at the conclusion of a tournament or when the player's participation has ended.

Only main-draw results in WTA Tour (incl. Grand Slam tournaments) are included in win–loss records.

=== Singles ===
Current through the 2026 Italian Open.

Tournament	2019	2020	2021	2022	2023	2024	2025	2026	SR	W–L
Grand Slam tournaments
Australian Open	A	A	A	Q2	Q3	Q3	Q1	1R	0 / 1	0–1
French Open	A	A	A	Q2	2R	Q1	Q3	1R	0 / 2	1–2
Wimbledon	A	A	Q2	Q1	1R	Q2	Q1	1R	0 / 2	0–2
US Open	A	A	A	Q2	Q2	Q2	Q2		0 / 0	0–0
Win–loss	0–0	0–0	0–0	0–0	1–2	0–0	0–0	0–3	0 / 5	1–5
WTA 1000 tournaments
Qatar Open	A	A	A	A	A	A	A	Q1	0 / 0	0–0
Indian Wells Open	A	A	A	A	Q1	A	A	Q1	0 / 0	0–0
Miami Open	A	A	A	A	Q1	A	A	1R	0 / 1	0–1
Italian Open	A	A	A	A	Q1	A	A	2R	0 / 1	1–1
Career statistics
Tournaments	1	0	1	2	4	4	2	6	Career total: 20	
Overall win–loss	1–1	0–0	0–1	3–2	1–4	1–4	3–2	1–6	0 / 20	10–20
Year-end ranking	295	297	217	120	166	175	86		$1,265,996	

== WTA Tour finals ==
=== Doubles: 3 (2 titles, 1 runner-up) ===
Legend WTA 1000 (–) WTA 500 (–) WTA 250 (2–1)	Finals by surface Hard (1–0) Clay (1–1) Grass (–)

Result	W–L	Date	Tournament	Tier	Surface	Partner	Opponents	Score
Win	1–0	Jul 2021	Ladies Open Lausanne, Switzerland	WTA 250	Clay	(Switzerland) Susan Bandecchi	(Norway) Ulrikke Eikeri (Greece) Valentini Grammatikopoulou	6–3, 6–7^{(3–7)}, [10–5]
Loss	1–1	Jul 2025	Iași Open, Romania	WTA 250	Clay	(Argentina) María Lourdes Carlé	(Slovenia) Veronika Erjavec (Hungary) Panna Udvardy	5–7, 3–6
Win	2–1	Nov 2026	Chennai Open, India	WTA 250	Hard	(Switzerland) Naïma Karamoko	(India) Vaishnavi Adkar (India) Rutuja Bhosale	6–2, 6–0

== WTA 125 finals ==
=== Singles: 3 (1 title, 2 runner-ups) ===
Result	W–L	Date	Tournament	Surface	Opponent	Score
Loss	0–1	Sep 2025	Ljubljana Open, Slovenia	Clay	(Slovenia) Kaja Juvan	4–6, 4–6
Win	1–1	Oct 2025	Rio Ladies Open, Brazil	Clay	(France) Alice Ramé	7–5, 6–2
Loss	1–2	Jul 2026	Bastad Open, Sweden	Clay	(Spain) Paula Badosa	5–7, 5–7

=== Doubles: 8 (7 titles, 1 runner-up) ===
Result	W–L	Date	Tournament	Surface	Partner	Opponents	Score
Loss	0–1	Sep 2024	Montreux Ladies Open, Switzerland	Clay	(Argentina) María Lourdes Carlé	(United States) Quinn Gleason (Brazil) Ingrid Martins	3–6, 6–4, [7–10]
Win	1–1	Mar 2025	Antalya Challenger 2, Turkey	Clay	(Argentina) María Lourdes Carlé	(Poland) Maja Chwalińska (Czech Republic) Anastasia Dețiuc	3–6, 7–5, [10–3]
Win	2–1	Mar 2025	Antalya Challenger 3, Turkey	Clay	(Hungary) Anna Bondár	(United Kingdom) Alicia Barnett (France) Elixane Lechemia	7–5, 2–6, [10–6]
Win	3–1	Jun 2025	Ilkley Open, United Kingdom	Grass	(Netherlands) Isabelle Haverlag	(Russia) Vitalia Diatchenko (United Kingdom) Eden Silva	6–1, 6–1
Win	4–1	Sep 2025	Montreux Ladies Open, Switzerland	Clay	Oksana Selekhmeteva	(Netherlands) Arantxa Rus (Romania) Anca Todoni	6–4, 6–1
Win	5–1	Sep 2025	Ljubljana Open, Slovenia	Clay	(Czech Republic) Miriam Škoch	(Slovenia) Dalila Jakupović (Slovenia) Nika Radišić	6–2, 6–2
Win	6–1	Jun 2026	Makarska Open, Croatia	Clay	(Netherlands) Isabelle Haverlag	(Brazil) Ingrid Martins; Ekaterina Ovcharenko	2–2, ret.
Win	7–1	Jul 2026	Bastad Open, Sweden	Clay	(Colombia) Emiliana Arango	(United Kingdom) Alicia Barnett (France) Elixane Lechemia	6–4, 6–1

== ITF Circuit finals ==
=== Singles: 19 (8 titles, 11 runner-ups) ===
Legend
W100 tournaments (1–0)
W80 tournaments (0–1)
W60/75 tournaments (2–2)
W25 tournaments (0–3)
W15 tournaments (5–5)

Result	W–L	Date	Tournament	Tier	Surface	Opponent	Score
Loss	0–1	Jun 2017	ITF Lenzerheide, Switzerland	25k	Clay	(Italy) Georgia Brescia	6–0, 4–6, 6–7^{(1)}
Loss	0–2	Nov 2017	ITF Oslo, Norway	15k	Hard (i)	(Switzerland) Leonie Küng	4–6, 4–6
Win	1–2	Mar 2018	ITF Mâcon, France	15k	Hard (i)	(Switzerland) Tess Sugnaux	6–4, 3–6, 6–3
Loss	1–3	May 2018	ITF San Severo, Italy	15k	Clay	(Greece) Despina Papamichail	1–6, 2–6
Win	2–3	Dec 2018	ITF Ortisei, Italy	15k	Hard (i)	(Chinese Taipei) Joanna Garland	6–4, 6–2
Loss	2–4	Jan 2019	ITF Sharm El Sheikh, Egypt	W15	Hard	(Belgium) Magali Kempen	7–5, 3–6, 3–6
Win	3–4	Feb 2019	ITF Sharm El Sheikh, Egypt	W15	Hard	(Finland) Oona Orpana	6–1, 6–3
Loss	3–5	Feb 2019	ITF Sharm El Sheikh, Egypt	W15	Hard	(Egypt) Mayar Sherif	4–6, 6–1, 3–6
Win	4–5	Apr 2019	ITF Cairo, Egypt	W15	Clay	(Austria) Melanie Klaffner	7–6^{(6)}, 7–5
Loss	4–6	May 2019	ITF Cairo, Egypt	W15	Clay	(Egypt) Mayar Sherif	2–6, 1–6
Loss	4–7	Jul 2019	ITF Horb, Germany	W25	Clay	(Croatia) Lea Bošković	4–6, 6–0, 1–6
Win	5–7	Jan 2021	ITF Manacor, Spain	W15	Clay	(Spain) Yvonne Cavallé Reimers	6–2, 7–6^{(4)}
Loss	5–8	Feb 2021	AK Ladies Open, Germany	W25	Carpet (i)	(Denmark) Clara Tauson	6–3, 1–6, 3–6
Loss	5–9	Oct 2021	Internationaux de Poitiers, France	W80	Hard (i)	(France) Chloé Paquet	4–6, 3–6
Loss	5–10	Apr 2022	Chiasso Open, Switzerland	W60	Clay	(Italy) Lucia Bronzetti	6–2, 3–6, 3–6
Win	6–10	Jul 2022	Amstelveen Open, Netherlands	W60	Clay	(United States) Emma Navarro	7–6^{(10)}, 6–0
Loss	6–11	Feb 2023	Open de Grenoble, France	W60	Hard (i)	(France) Océane Dodin	2–6, 5–7
Win	7–11	Oct 2024	GB Pro-Series Glasgow, UK	W75	Hard (i)	(Georgia (country)) Mariam Bolkvadze	6–4, 6–2
Win	8–11	Sep 2025	Lisboa Belém Open, Portugal	W100	Clay	(Latvia) Darja Semeņistaja	6–2, 6–1

=== Doubles: 10 (4 titles, 6 runner-ups) ===
Legend W100 tournaments (0–1) W60/75 tournaments (1–2) W25 tournaments (1–1) W15 tournaments (2–2)

Result	W–L	Date	Tournament	Tier	Surface	Partner	Opponents	Score
Loss	0–1	Sep 2016	ITF Sion, Switzerland	10k	Clay	(Switzerland) Leonie Küng	(United Kingdom) Emily Arbuthnott (Switzerland) Karin Kennel	2–6, 1–6
Loss	0–2	Dec 2018	ITF Ortisei, Italy	15k	Hard (i)	(Italy) Verena Hofer	(Slovenia) Veronika Erjavec (Slovenia) Kristina Novak	4–6, 5–7
Win	1–2	Apr 2019	ITF Cairo, Egypt	W15	Clay	(Greece) Despina Papamichail	(Egypt) Mayar Sherif (Egypt) Rana Sherif Ahmed	6–3, 6–2
Win	2–2	May 2019	ITF Cairo, Egypt	W15	Clay	(Slovakia) Alica Rusová	(Australia) Seone Mendez (Ecuador) Charlotte Römer	7–5, 0–6, [10–6]
Win	3–2	Sep 2019	Verbier Open, Switzerland	W25	Clay	(Switzerland) Xenia Knoll	(Turkey) İpek Soylu (Liechtenstein) Kathinka von Deichmann	6–4, 6–3
Loss	3–3	Feb 2022	ITF Sharm El Sheikh, Egypt	W25	Hard	(Romania) Irina Fetecău	(Netherlands) Isabelle Haverlag (Lithuania) Justina Mikulskytė	1–6, 2–6
Loss	3–4	Feb 2022	AK Ladies Open, Germany	W60	Carpet (i)	(Switzerland) Susan Bandecchi	(Georgia (country)) Mariam Bolkvadze (United Kingdom) Samantha Murray Sharan	3–6, 5–7
Win	4–4	Aug 2022	Bronx Open, United States	W60	Hard	(Russia) Anna Blinkova	(South Korea) Han Na-lae (Japan) Hiroko Kuwata	6–3, 6–3
Loss	4–5	Apr 2024	Chiasso Open, Switzerland	W75	Clay	(Greece) Despina Papamichail	(Germany) Lena Papadakis (United Kingdom) Emily Appleton	6–4, 4–6, [6–10]
Loss	4–6	Aug 2025	Landisville Tennis Challenge, United States	W100	Hard	(Brazil) Ingrid Martins	(United States) Carmen Corley (United States) Ivana Corley	6–4, 6–7^{(4)}, [10–12]

== Wins against top 10 players ==
- Waltert has a 1–2 record against players who were, at the time the match was played, ranked in the top 10.

No.	Player	Rk	Event	Surface	Rd	Score	Rk	Years	Ref
1	(United States) Danielle Collins	7	Ladies Open Lausanne	Clay	1R	6–7^{(5–7)}, 6–3, 7–6^{(8–6)}	154	2022	

- Key: (Rk) first use, opponent rank; (Rd) round; (Rk) 2nd use, player rank; (Ref) reference; (F) final; (SF) semifinal; (QF) quarterfinal; (#R) rounds 4, 3, 2, 1; (RR) round-robin stage; (Q#) qualifying rounds or stages (3), 2, 1.
