= 2025 Zavarovalnica Sava Ljubljana =

- Date: 8–14 September
- Edition: 3rd
- Category: WTA 125
- Draw: 32S / 16D
- Prize money: $115,000
- Surface: Clay
- Location: Ljubljana, Slovenia
- Venue: Tivoli Tennis Center

Champions

Singles
- (Slovenia) Kaja Juvan

Doubles
- (Czech Republic) Miriam Škoch / (Switzerland) Simona Waltert
- Ljubljana Open

The 2025 WTA Zavarovalnica Sava Ljubljana was a professional women's tennis tournament played on outdoor clay courts. It was the third edition of the tournament and part of the 2025 WTA 125 tournaments. It took place at the Tivoli Tennis Center in Ljubljana, Slovenia between 8 and 14 September 2025.

== Singles entrants ==
=== Seeds ===
| Country | Player | Rank^{1} | Seed |
|---|---|---|---|
| SUI | Simona Waltert | 124 | 1 |
| AUT | Sinja Kraus | 129 | 2 |
| SLO | Tamara Zidanšek | 148 | 3 |
| CZE | Dominika Šalková | 160 | 4 |
| SLO | Kaja Juvan | 161 | 5 |
| BEL | Hanne Vandewinkel | 162 | 6 |
| ITA | Nuria Brancaccio | 165 | 7 |
| POL | Maja Chwalińska | 177 | 8 |

- ^{1} Rankings are as of 25 August 2025.

=== Other entrants ===
The following players received a wildcard into the singles main draw:

- Darya Astakhova
- (Slovenia) Pia Lovrič
- (Slovenia) Kristina Novak
- (Slovenia) Nika Radišić

The following players received entry into the main draw through qualification:

- (Croatia) Lucija Ćirić Bagarić
- (Serbia) Teodora Kostović
- (Czech Republic) Aneta Kučmová
- (Turkey) İpek Öz

The following player received entry as a lucky loser:

- (Italy) Silvia Ambrosio

=== Withdrawals ===
- (Romania) Miriam Bulgaru → replaced by (Italy) Silvia Ambrosio

== Doubles entrants ==
=== Seeds ===
| Country | Player | Country | Player | Rank | Seed |
|---|---|---|---|---|---|
| CZE | Miriam Škoch | SUI | Simona Waltert | 188 | 1 |
| | Amina Anshba | GBR | Eden Silva | 311 | 2 |
| CZE | Aneta Kučmová | SWE | Lisa Zaar | 332 | 3 |
| GBR | Freya Christie | BIH | Anita Wagner | 401 | 4 |

- Rankings as of 25 August 2025.

=== Other entrants ===
The following pair received a wildcard into the doubles main draw:

- (Slovenia) Nala Kovačič / (Slovenia) Alja Senica

== Champions ==
=== Singles ===
- (Slovenia) Kaja Juvan def. (Switzerland) Simona Waltert 6–4, 6–4

=== Doubles ===
- (Czech Republic) Miriam Škoch / (Switzerland) Simona Waltert def. (Slovenia) Dalila Jakupović / (Slovenia) Nika Radišić 6–2, 6–2
