= 2023 Țiriac Foundation Trophy =

- Date: 11–17 September
- Edition: 2nd
- Category: WTA 125
- Draw: 32S / 8D
- Prize money: $115,000
- Surface: Clay
- Location: Bucharest, Romania
- Venue: National Tennis Centre

Champions

Singles
- (Australia) Astra Sharma

Doubles
- (Italy) Angelica Moratelli / (Italy) Camilla Rosatello
← 2022 ·	Țiriac Foundation Trophy	· 2024 →

The 2023 Țiriac Foundation Trophy was a professional tennis tournament played on outdoor clay courts. It was the eighth edition of the tournament and second as a WTA 125 which was also part of the 2023 WTA 125 tournaments, offering a total of $115,000 in prize money. It took place at the National Tennis Centre in Bucharest, Romania between 11 and 17 September 2022.

== Singles entrants ==
=== Seeds ===
Country	Player	Rank^{1}	Seed
ROU	Ana Bogdan	60	1
BUL	Viktoriya Tomova	82	2
ROU	Jaqueline Cristian	99	3
ITA	Sara Errani	115	4
HUN	Anna Bondár	128	5
ESP	Jéssica Bouzas Maneiro	134	6
GER	Noma Noha Akugue	142	7
LAT	Darja Semeņistaja	149	8

- ^{1} Rankings are as of 28 August 2023.

=== Other entrants ===
The following players received a wildcard into the singles main draw:

- (Romania) Ilinca Amariei
- (Romania) Irina Fetecău
- (Romania) Andreea Mitu
- (Romania) Anca Todoni

The following players qualified into the singles main draw:

- Darya Astakhova
- (Belgium) Marie Benoît
- (Romania) Maria Sara Popa
- (Italy) Camilla Rosatello

The following player received entry as a lucky loser:

- (Netherlands) Suzan Lamens

=== Withdrawals ===
Before the tournament

- (Andorra) Victoria Jiménez Kasintseva → replaced by (Netherlands) Suzan Lamens

== Doubles entrants ==
=== Seeds ===
Country	Player	Country	Player	Rank^{1}	Seed
HUN	Anna Bondár	BEL	Kimberley Zimmermann	105	1
	Irina Khromacheva	UKR	Valeriya Strakhova	203	2

- ^{1} Rankings as of 28 August 2023.

=== Other entrants ===
The following pair received a wildcard into the doubles main draw:

- (Romania) Ilinca Amariei / (Romania) Anca Todoni

The following pair received entry as alternates:

- (Belgium) Marie Benoît / (Romania) Alexandra Cadanțu-Ignatik

=== Withdrawals ===
- (Romania) Ana Bogdan / (Romania) Jaqueline Cristian → replaced by (Belgium) Marie Benoît / (Romania) Alexandra Cadanțu-Ignatik

== Champions ==
=== Singles ===
- (Australia) Astra Sharma def. (Italy) Sara Errani 0–6, 7–5, 6–2

=== Doubles ===
- (Italy) Angelica Moratelli / (Italy) Camilla Rosatello def. (Greece) Valentini Grammatikopoulou / (Czech Republic) Anna Sisková 7–5, 6–4
