= 2022 Țiriac Foundation Trophy =

- Date: 12–18 September
- Edition: 1st
- Category: WTA 125
- Draw: 32S / 8D
- Prize money: $115,000
- Surface: Clay
- Location: Bucharest, Romania
- Venue: National Tennis Centre

Champions

Singles
- (Romania) Irina-Camelia Begu

Doubles
- (Spain) Aliona Bolsova / (Venezuela) Andrea Gámiz
Țiriac Foundation Trophy	· 2023 →

The 2022 Țiriac Foundation Trophy was a professional tennis tournament played on outdoor clay courts. It was the seventh edition of the tournament and first as a WTA 125 which is also part of the 2022 WTA 125 tournaments, offering a total of $115,000 in prize money. It took place at the National Tennis Centre in Bucharest, Romania between 12 and 18 September 2022.

== Champions ==
=== Singles ===
- (Romania) Irina-Camelia Begu def. (Hungary) Réka Luca Jani 6–3, 6–3

=== Doubles ===
- (Spain) Aliona Bolsova / (Venezuela) Andrea Gámiz def. (Hungary) Réka Luca Jani / (Hungary) Panna Udvardy 7–5, 6–3

== Singles entrants ==
=== Seeds ===
Country	Player	Rank^{1}	Seed
ROU	Sorana Cîrstea	37	1
ROU	Irina-Camelia Begu	42	2
HUN	Anna Bondár	49	3
ITA	Lucia Bronzetti	57	4
GER	Jule Niemeier	73	5
EGY	Mayar Sherif	74	6
HUN	Panna Udvardy	76	7
MNE	Danka Kovinić	78	8

- ^{1} Rankings are as of 4 September 2022.

=== Other entrants ===
The following players received a wildcard into the singles main draw:

- (Romania) Irina-Camelia Begu
- (Romania) Miriam Bulgaru
- (Romania) Sorana Cîrstea
- (Romania) Ilona Georgiana Ghioroaie
- (Romania) Andreea Roșca
- (Romania) Ioana Loredana Roșca

The following player received entry into the singles main draw as a special exempt:

- (Italy) Nuria Brancaccio

The following players qualified into the singles main draw:

- Darya Astakhova
- (Spain) Aliona Bolsova
- (Romania) Cristina Dinu
- (Spain) Rebeka Masarova

The following players received entry as lucky losers:

- (Argentina) María Lourdes Carlé
- (Turkey) İpek Öz

=== Withdrawals ===
Before the tournament

- (Sweden) Mirjam Björklund → replaced by (Argentina) María Lourdes Carlé
- (Germany) Jule Niemeier → replaced by (Australia) Jaimee Fourlis
- (Spain) Nuria Párrizas Díaz → replaced by Erika Andreeva
- (Netherlands) Arantxa Rus → replaced by (Turkey) İpek Öz

== Doubles entrants ==
=== Seeds ===
Country	Player	Country	Player	Rank^{1}	Seed
ESP	Aliona Bolsova	VEN	Andrea Gámiz	170	1
ROU	Raluca Olaru	BRA	Laura Pigossi	232	2

- ^{1} Rankings as of 5 September 2022.

=== Other entrants ===
The following pair received a wildcard into the doubles main draw:

- (Romania) Georgia Crăciun / (Romania) Cristina Dinu
