= 2024 Țiriac Foundation Trophy – Singles =

Singles
- 2024 Țiriac Foundation Trophy

Final
- Champion: (Romania) Miriam Bulgaru
- Runner-up: (Liechtenstein) Kathinka von Deichmann
- Score: 6–3, 1–6, 6–4

Events
Singles	Doubles
← 2023 ·	Țiriac Foundation Trophy	· 2025 →

Miriam Bulgaru won the singles title at the 2024 Țiriac Foundation Trophy, defeating Kathinka von Deichmann in the final, 6–3, 1–6, 6–4.

Astra Sharma was the reigning champion, but withdrew before the tournament began.

== Seeds ==
1. (Argentina) María Lourdes Carlé (quarterfinals)
2. (Germany) Tamara Korpatsch (withdrew)
3. (Romania) Irina-Camelia Begu (second round)
4. (Latvia) Darja Semeņistaja (first round)
5. (Romania) Anca Todoni (second round, withdrew)
6. (France) Séléna Janicijevic (first round)
7. Ekaterina Makarova (first round, retired)
8. (Poland) Katarzyna Kawa (first round)
9. (Romania) Miriam Bulgaru (champion)

== Draw ==
=== Key ===
- Q = Qualifier
- WC = Wild card
- LL = Lucky loser
- Alt = Alternate
- SE = Special exempt
- PR = Protected ranking
- ITF = ITF entry
- JE = Junior exempt
- w/o = Walkover
- r = Retired
- d = Defaulted
- SR = Special ranking

=== Finals ===
Semifinals
(Liechtenstein) Kathinka von Deichmann	6	6
WC	(Romania) Patricia Maria Țig	2	0
Q	(Georgia (country)) Ekaterine Gorgodze	6	3	2
9	(Romania) Miriam Bulgaru	3	6	6

Final
(Liechtenstein) Kathinka von Deichmann	3	6	4
9	(Romania) Miriam Bulgaru	6	1	6

=== Top half ===
First round
1	(Argentina) ML Carlé	6	3	7
WC	(Romania) MS Popa	4	6	5
(Portugal) F Jorge	7^{9}	6
WC	(Romania) I Amariei	6^{7}	3
(United States) M Mateas	6	5	0
(Greece) D Papamichail	1	7	6
(Liechtenstein) K von Deichmann	6	6
6	(France) S Janicijevic	1	3
3	(Romania) I-C Begu	6	3
(Romania) C Dinu	2	0^{r}
WC	(Romania) PM Țig	6	6
(Romania) I Bara	1	2
(Netherlands) A Koevermans	6	7
WC	(Romania) G Crăciun	2	5
(Slovenia) D Jakupović	5	3
5	(Romania) A Todoni	7	6

Second round
1	(Argentina) ML Carlé	6	6
(Portugal) F Jorge	1	3
(Greece) D Papamichail	6	1	2
(Liechtenstein) K von Deichmann	2	6	6
3	(Romania) I-C Begu	3	4
WC	(Romania) PM Țig	6	6
(Netherlands) A Koevermans	w/o
5	(Romania) A Todoni

Quarterfinals
1	(Argentina) ML Carlé	6^{4}	4
(Liechtenstein) K von Deichmann	7^{7}	6
WC	(Romania) PM Țig	6	3	7
(Netherlands) A Koevermans	1	6	5

Semifinals
(Liechtenstein) K von Deichmann	6	6
WC	(Romania) PM Țig	2	0

=== Bottom half ===
First round
7	E Makarova	4	0^{r}
(Switzerland) V Ryser	6	2
(Belgium) M Benoît	6	7^{12}
Q	(Switzerland) L Küng	2	6^{10}
Q	(Georgia (country)) E Gorgodze	6	3	6
(Switzerland) S Waltert	4	6	4
(Spain) A Bolsova	3	6	6
4	(Latvia) D Semeņistaja	6	3	1
8	(Poland) K Kawa	0	4
Q	A Charaeva	6	6
(France) C Monnet	6	4	0^{r}
Q	A Ibragimova	4	6	4
(Serbia) D Radanović	7^{7}	6
(Lithuania) J Mikulskytė	6^{5}	4
LL	(Italy) N Fossa Huergo	1	3
9	(Romania) M Bulgaru	6	6

Second round
(Switzerland) V Ryser	4	5
(Belgium) M Benoît	6	7
Q	(Georgia (country)) E Gorgodze	4	6	6
(Spain) A Bolsova	6	2	4
Q	A Charaeva	4	4
Q	A Ibragimova	6	6
(Serbia) D Radanović	4	4
9	(Romania) M Bulgaru	6	6

Quarterfinals
(Belgium) M Benoît	2	1
Q	(Georgia (country)) E Gorgodze	6	6
Q	A Ibragimova	2	2
9	(Romania) M Bulgaru	6	6

Semifinals
Q	(Georgia (country)) E Gorgodze	6	3	2
9	(Romania) M Bulgaru	3	6	6

== Qualifying ==
=== Seeds ===
1. (Germany) Noma Noha Akugue (qualifying competition)
2. Alina Charaeva (qualified)
3. (Switzerland) Leonie Küng (qualified)
4. (Cyprus) Raluca Șerban (first round)
5. (Belgium) Sofia Costoulas (first round, retired)
6. Alevtina Ibragimova (qualified)
7. (Spain) Lucía Cortez Llorca (qualifying competition, retired)
8. Ksenia Laskutova (first round)

=== Qualifiers ===
1. Alevtina Ibragimova
2. Alina Charaeva
3. (Switzerland) Leonie Küng
4. (Georgia (country)) Ekaterine Gorgodze

=== Lucky loser ===
1. (Italy) Nicole Fossa Huergo

=== Qualifying draw ===
==== First qualifier ====
First round
1	(Germany) Noma Noha Akugue	6	6
(Romania) Irina Fetecău	1	3
Amina Anshba	2	4
6	Alevtina Ibragimova	6	6

Qualifying competition
1	(Germany) Noma Noha Akugue	2	5
6	Alevtina Ibragimova	6	7

==== Second qualifier ====
First round
2	Alina Charaeva	7^{7}	6
WC	(Romania) Oana Georgeta Simion	6^{4}	0
(Italy) Nicole Fossa Huergo	6	5
5	(Belgium) Sofia Costoulas	1	2^{r}

Qualifying competition
2	Alina Charaeva	2	6	6
(Italy) Nicole Fossa Huergo	6	2	2

==== Third qualifier ====
First round
3	(Switzerland) Leonie Küng	6	6^{4}	6
WC	(Romania) Elena Ruxandra Bertea	0	7^{7}	2
(Serbia) Mia Ristić	4	6	7
8	Ksenia Laskutova	6	2	5

Qualifying competition
3	(Switzerland) Leonie Küng	6	6
(Serbia) Mia Ristić	4	4

==== Fourth qualifier ====
First round
4	(Cyprus) Raluca Șerban	6	1	4
(Georgia (country)) Ekaterine Gorgodze	4	6	6
(Romania) Andreea Prisăcariu	3	6	2
7	(Spain) Lucía Cortez Llorca	6	2	6

Qualifying competition
(Georgia (country)) Ekaterine Gorgodze	5
7	(Spain) Lucía Cortez Llorca	3^{r}
