= 2024 Țiriac Foundation Trophy =

- Date: 9–15 September
- Edition: 3rd
- Category: WTA 125
- Draw: 32S / 8D
- Surface: Clay
- Location: Bucharest, Romania
- Venue: National Tennis Centre

Champions

Singles
- (Romania) Miriam Bulgaru

Doubles
- (France) Carole Monnet / (Latvia) Darja Semeņistaja
← 2023 ·	Țiriac Foundation Trophy	· 2025 →

The 2024 Țiriac Foundation Trophy was a professional tennis tournament played on outdoor clay courts. It was the ninth edition of the tournament, which was part of the 2024 WTA 125 tournaments. It took place at the National Tennis Centre in Bucharest, Romania between 9 and 15 September 2024.

== Singles entrants ==
=== Seeds ===
Country	Player	Rank^{1}	Seed
ARG	María Lourdes Carlé	83	1
~~GER~~	~~Tamara Korpatsch~~	~~111~~	~~2~~
ROU	Irina-Camelia Begu	130	3
LAT	Darja Semeņistaja	134	4
ROU	Anca Todoni	136	5
FRA	Séléna Janicijevic	159	6
	Ekaterina Makarova	163	7
POL	Katarzyna Kawa	181	8
ROU	Miriam Bulgaru	183	9

- ^{1} Rankings are as of 26 August 2024.

=== Other entrants ===
The following players received a wildcard into the singles main draw:

- (Romania) Ilinca Amariei
- (Romania) Georgia Crăciun
- (Romania) Maria Sara Popa
- (Romania) Patricia Maria Țig

The following players qualified into the singles main draw:

- Alina Charaeva
- (Georgia (country)) Ekaterine Gorgodze
- Alevtina Ibragimova
- (Switzerland) Leonie Küng

The following player received entry as a lucky loser:

- (Italy) Nicole Fossa Huergo

=== Withdrawals ===
- (Germany) Tamara Korpatsch → replaced by (Italy) Nicole Fossa Huergo

== Doubles entrants ==
=== Seeds ===
Country	Player	Country	Player	Rank^{1}	Seed
POR	Francisca Jorge	CZE	Anna Sisková	180	1
	Amina Anshba	SUI	Conny Perrin	193	2

- ^{1} Rankings as of 26 August 2024.

=== Other entrants ===
The following pair received a wildcard into the doubles main draw:

- (Romania) Ilinca Amariei / (Romania) Mara Gae

== Champions ==
=== Singles ===
- (Romania) Miriam Bulgaru def. (Liechtenstein) Kathinka von Deichmann, 6–3, 1–6, 6–4

=== Doubles ===
- (France) Carole Monnet / (Latvia) Darja Semeņistaja def. (Spain) Aliona Bolsova / (Poland) Katarzyna Kawa, 1–6, 6–2, [10–7]
