= 2023 Țiriac Foundation Trophy – Doubles =

Doubles
- 2023 Țiriac Foundation Trophy

Final
- Champions: (Italy) Angelica Moratelli (Italy) Camilla Rosatello
- Runners-up: (Greece) Valentini Grammatikopoulou (Czech Republic) Anna Sisková
- Score: 7–5, 6–4

Events
Singles	Doubles
← 2022 ·	Țiriac Foundation Trophy	· 2024 →

Aliona Bolsova and Andrea Gámiz were the reigning champions, but they chose not to defend their title.

Angelica Moratelli and Camilla Rosatello won the title, defeating Valentini Grammatikopoulou and Anna Sisková in the final, 7–5, 6–4.

== Seeds ==
1. (Hungary) Anna Bondár / (Belgium) Kimberley Zimmermann (quarterfinals)
2. Irina Khromacheva / (Ukraine) Valeriya Strakhova (semifinals)

== Draw ==
=== Key ===
- Q = Qualifier
- WC = Wild card
- LL = Lucky loser
- Alt = Alternate
- SE = Special exempt
- PR = Protected ranking
- ITF = ITF entry
- JE = Junior exempt
- w/o = Walkover
- r = Retired
- d = Defaulted
- SR = Special ranking

=== Draw ===
Quarterfinals
1	(Hungary) A Bondár (Belgium) K Zimmermann	1	3
(Romania) A Mitu (Hungary) F Stollár	6	6
WC	(Romania) I Amariei (Romania) A Todoni	1	1
(Italy) A Moratelli (Italy) C Rosatello	6	6
(Greece) V Grammatikopoulou (Czech Republic) A Sisková	6	6
(France) E Lechemia (Switzerland) C Perrin	3	4
Alt	(Belgium) M Benoît (Romania) A Cadanțu-Ignatik	3	5
2	I Khromacheva (Ukraine) V Strakhova	6	7

Semifinals
(Romania) A Mitu (Hungary) F Stollár	3	4
(Italy) A Moratelli (Italy) C Rosatello	6	6
(Greece) V Grammatikopoulou (Czech Republic) A Sisková	6	7^{9}
2	I Khromacheva (Ukraine) V Strakhova	2	6^{7}

Final
(Italy) A Moratelli (Italy) C Rosatello	7	6
(Greece) V Grammatikopoulou (Czech Republic) A Sisková	5	4
