= 2022 Țiriac Foundation Trophy – Singles =

Singles
- 2022 Țiriac Foundation Trophy

Final
- Champion: (Romania) Irina-Camelia Begu
- Runner-up: (Hungary) Réka Luca Jani
- Score: 6–3, 6–3

Events
Singles	Doubles
Țiriac Foundation Trophy	· 2023 →

Irina-Camelia Begu won the title, defeating Réka Luca Jani in the final, 6–3, 6–3.

This was the first edition of the tournament.

== Seeds ==
1. (Romania) Sorana Cîrstea (first round)
2. (Romania) Irina-Camelia Begu (champion)
3. (Hungary) Anna Bondár (second round)
4. (Italy) Lucia Bronzetti (first round)
5. (Egypt) Mayar Sherif (quarterfinals)
6. (Hungary) Panna Udvardy (quarterfinals)
7. (Montenegro) Danka Kovinić (first round)
8. (Hungary) Dalma Gálfi (second round)

== Draw ==
=== Key ===
- Q = Qualifier
- WC = Wild card
- LL = Lucky loser
- Alt = Alternate
- SE = Special exempt
- PR = Protected ranking
- ITF = ITF entry
- JE = Junior exempt
- w/o = Walkover
- r = Retired
- d = Defaulted
- SR = Special ranking

=== Finals ===
Semifinals
(Hungary) Réka Luca Jani	7	7^{8}
(Belgium) Maryna Zanevska	5	6^{6}
(Italy) Sara Errani	2	2
2/WC	(Romania) Irina-Camelia Begu	6	6

Final
(Hungary) Réka Luca Jani	3	3
2/WC	(Romania) Irina-Camelia Begu	6	6

=== Top half ===
First round
1/WC	(Romania) S Cîrstea	3	3
(Switzerland) S Waltert	6	6
(Hungary) RL Jani	6	6
SE	(Italy) N Brancaccio	3	3
(Bulgaria) V Tomova	6	6
WC	(Romania) IG Ghioroaie	1	3
Q	(Romania) C Dinu	5	5
6	(Hungary) P Udvardy	7	7
4	(Italy) L Bronzetti	1	0
(Belgium) M Zanevska	6	6
(Italy) E Cocciaretto	4	1
E Andreeva	6	6
WC	(Romania) A Roșca	0	3
(Austria) J Grabher	6	6
WC	(Romania) M Bulgaru	4	2
5	(Egypt) M Sherif	6	6

Second round
(Switzerland) S Waltert	4	6	1
(Hungary) RL Jani	6	2	6
(Bulgaria) V Tomova	6	1	4
6	(Hungary) P Udvardy	2	6	6
(Belgium) M Zanevska	6	6
E Andreeva	4	3
(Austria) J Grabher	3	3
5	(Egypt) M Sherif	6	6

Quarterfinals
(Hungary) RL Jani	0	6	7
6	(Hungary) P Udvardy	6	4	5
(Belgium) M Zanevska	6	6
5	(Egypt) M Sherif	1	4

Semifinals
(Hungary) RL Jani	7	7^{8}
(Belgium) M Zanevska	5	6^{6}

=== Bottom half ===
First round
8	(Hungary) D Gálfi	6	6
(Australia) J Fourlis	4	4
WC	(Romania) IL Roșca	1	0
(Italy) S Errani	6	6
(Romania) G Lee	6	2	4
Q	(Spain) R Masarova	3	6	6
Q	D Astakhova	6	3	3
3	(Hungary) A Bondár	4	6	6
7	(Montenegro) D Kovinić	4	2
(Ukraine) K Baindl	6	6
LL	(Argentina) ML Carlé	1	6^{8}
Q	(Spain) A Bolsova	6	7^{10}
(Romania) I Bara	6	6
LL	(Turkey) İ Öz	3	2
(Brazil) L Pigossi	3	1
2/WC	(Romania) I-C Begu	6	6

Second round
8	(Hungary) D Gálfi	6	3	2
(Italy) S Errani	2	6	6
Q	(Spain) R Masarova	6	6
3	(Hungary) A Bondár	4	2
(Ukraine) K Baindl	6	6
Q	(Spain) A Bolsova	4	4
(Romania) I Bara	0	2
2/WC	(Romania) I-C Begu	6	6

Quarterfinals
(Italy) S Errani	6	1	6
Q	(Spain) R Masarova	3	6	4
(Ukraine) K Baindl	1	1
2/WC	(Romania) I-C Begu	6	6

Semifinals
(Italy) S Errani	2	2
2/WC	(Romania) I-C Begu	6	6

== Qualifying ==
=== Seeds ===
1. (Spain) Rebeka Masarova (qualified)
2. (Turkey) İpek Öz (qualifying competition, lucky loser)
3. (Argentina) María Lourdes Carlé (qualifying competition, lucky loser)
4. (Brazil) Carolina Alves (first round)
5. (Cyprus) Raluca Șerban (first round)
6. (Romania) Alexandra Cadanțu-Ignatik (qualifying competition, retired)
7. (Croatia) Tena Lukas (first round)
8. (Spain) Aliona Bolsova (qualified)

=== Qualifiers ===
1. (Spain) Rebeka Masarova
2. (Spain) Aliona Bolsova
3. Darya Astakhova
4. (Romania) Cristina Dinu

=== Lucky losers ===
1. (Argentina) María Lourdes Carlé
2. (Turkey) İpek Öz

=== Draw ===
==== First qualifier ====
First round
1	(Spain) Rebeka Masarova	6	6
(Argentina) Paula Ormaechea	2	1
(Romania) Oana Gavrilă	4	0
6	(Romania) Alexandra Cadanțu-Ignatik	6	6

Qualifying competition
1	(Spain) Rebeka Masarova	7^{7}	4
6	(Romania) Alexandra Cadanțu-Ignatik	6^{2}	0^{r}

==== Second qualifier ====
First round
2	(Turkey) İpek Öz	3	6	6
(United States) Jessie Aney	6	1	4
WC	(Romania) Georgia Crăciun	6	4	2
8	(Spain) Aliona Bolsova	2	6	6

Qualifying competition
2	(Turkey) İpek Öz	7^{7}	4	6^{4}
8	(Spain) Aliona Bolsova	6^{4}	6	7^{7}

==== Third qualifier ====
First round
3	(Argentina) María Lourdes Carlé	5	6	7
(Romania) Oana Georgeta Simion	7	3	5
Darya Astakhova	6	7
5	(Cyprus) Raluca Șerban	4	5

Qualifying competition
3	(Argentina) María Lourdes Carlé	6^{4}	4
Darya Astakhova	7^{7}	6

==== Fourth qualifier ====
First round
4	(Brazil) Carolina Alves	3	2
(Romania) Cristina Dinu	6	6
WC	(Romania) Lavinia Tănăsie	6	5	6
7	(Croatia) Tena Lukas	1	7	3

Qualifying competition
(Romania) Cristina Dinu	6	6
WC	(Romania) Lavinia Tănăsie	4	0
