= 2024 Țiriac Foundation Trophy – Doubles =

Doubles
- 2024 Țiriac Foundation Trophy

Final
- Champions: (France) Carole Monnet (Latvia) Darja Semeņistaja
- Runners-up: (Spain) Aliona Bolsova (Poland) Katarzyna Kawa
- Score: 1–6, 6–2, [10–7]

Events
Singles	Doubles
← 2023 ·	Țiriac Foundation Trophy	· 2025 →

Carole Monnet and Darja Semeņistaja won the title, defeating Aliona Bolsova and Katarzyna Kawa in the final, 1–6, 6–2, [10–7].

Angelica Moratelli and Camilla Rosatello were the reigning champions, but they chose to compete in Guadalajara and Monastir, respectively, this year.

== Seeds ==
1. (Portugal) Francisca Jorge / (Czech Republic) Anna Sisková (semifinals)
2. Amina Anshba / (Switzerland) Conny Perrin (quarterfinals)

== Draw ==
=== Key ===
- Q = Qualifier
- WC = Wild card
- LL = Lucky loser
- Alt = Alternate
- SE = Special exempt
- PR = Protected ranking
- ITF = ITF entry
- JE = Junior exempt
- w/o = Walkover
- r = Retired
- d = Defaulted
- SR = Special ranking

=== Draw ===
Quarterfinals
1	(Portugal) F Jorge (Czech Republic) A Sisková	6	7^{7}
(Greece) D Papamichail (Switzerland) S Waltert	3	6^{5}
(Spain) A Bolsova (Poland) K Kawa	6	6
(Romania) I Bara (Slovenia) D Jakupović	4	2
WC	(Romania) I Amariei (Romania) M Gae	3	4
(France) C Monnet (Latvia) D Semeņistaja	6	6
E Makarova (United States) M Mateas	6	2	[12]
2	A Anshba (Switzerland) C Perrin	3	6	[10]

Semifinals
1	(Portugal) F Jorge (Czech Republic) A Sisková	6	4	[5]
(Spain) A Bolsova (Poland) K Kawa	2	6	[10]
(France) C Monnet (Latvia) D Semeņistaja	7	4	[10]
E Makarova (United States) M Mateas	5	6	[7]

Final
(Spain) A Bolsova (Poland) K Kawa	6	2	[7]
(France) C Monnet (Latvia) D Semeņistaja	1	6	[10]
