= 2023 Țiriac Foundation Trophy – Singles =

Singles
- 2023 Țiriac Foundation Trophy

Final
- Champion: (Australia) Astra Sharma
- Runner-up: (Italy) Sara Errani
- Score: 0–6, 7–5, 6–2

Events
Singles	Doubles
← 2022 ·	Țiriac Foundation Trophy	· 2024 →

Astra Sharma won the title, defeating Sara Errani in the final, 0–6, 7–5, 6–2.

This was the second edition of the tournament as a WTA 125. Irina-Camelia Begu was the reigning champion but chose not to participate.

== Seeds ==
1. (Romania) Ana Bogdan (second round)
2. (Bulgaria) Viktoriya Tomova (second round)
3. (Romania) Jaqueline Cristian (semifinals)
4. (Italy) Sara Errani (final)
5. (Hungary) Anna Bondár (quarterfinals)
6. (Spain) Jéssica Bouzas Maneiro (second round)
7. (Germany) Noma Noha Akugue (quarterfinals)
8. (Latvia) Darja Semeņistaja (semifinals)

== Draw ==
=== Key ===
- Q = Qualifier
- WC = Wild card
- LL = Lucky loser
- Alt = Alternate
- SE = Special exempt
- PR = Protected ranking
- ITF = ITF entry
- JE = Junior exempt
- w/o = Walkover
- r = Retired
- d = Defaulted
- SR = Special ranking

=== Finals ===
Semifinals
(Australia) Astra Sharma	6	2	6
3	(Romania) Jaqueline Cristian	2	6	2
4	(Italy) Sara Errani	6	6
8	(Latvia) Darja Semeņistaja	3	3

Final
(Australia) Astra Sharma	0	7	6
4	(Italy) Sara Errani	6	5	2

=== Top half ===
First round
1	(Romania) A Bogdan	5	7	6
(Italy) N Brancaccio	7	5	3
(Switzerland) Y In-Albon	2	1
(Australia) A Sharma	6	6
Q	(Belgium) M Benoît	3	6	6
(France) C Paquet	6	2	4
(Greece) V Grammatikopoulou	3	6	4
5	(Hungary) A Bondár	6	2	6
3	(Romania) J Cristian	6	6
(Switzerland) L Sun	1	3
(Spain) C Martínez Círez	1	3
WC	(Romania) A Mitu	6	6
(Romania) PM Țig	6	2	2
(Argentina) ML Carlé	4	6	6
(Romania) A Cadanțu-Ignatik	3	7	3
6	(Spain) J Bouzas Maneiro	6	5	6

Second round
1	(Romania) A Bogdan	7^{7}	6^{3}	5
(Australia) A Sharma	6^{2}	7^{7}	7
Q	(Belgium) M Benoît	1	2
5	(Hungary) A Bondár	6	6
3	(Romania) J Cristian	6	6
WC	(Romania) A Mitu	1	2
(Argentina) ML Carlé	6	6
6	(Spain) J Bouzas Maneiro	3	1

Quarterfinals
(Australia) A Sharma	4	6	7
5	(Hungary) A Bondár	6	3	5
3	(Romania) J Cristian	7^{7}	6
(Argentina) ML Carlé	6^{4}	4

Semifinals
(Australia) A Sharma	6	2	6
3	(Romania) J Cristian	2	6	2

=== Bottom half ===
First round
7	(Germany) N Noha Akugue	6	6
(Ukraine) K Zavatska	3	4
WC	(Romania) I Amariei	6	6
(Spain) I Burillo Escorihuela	4	4
WC	(Romania) I Fetecău	1	6^{8}
Q	(Romania) MS Popa	6	7^{10}
LL	(Netherlands) S Lamens	0	2
4	(Italy) S Errani	6	6
8	(Latvia) D Semeņistaja	6	6
(Turkey) B Cengiz	2	2
(Romania) I Bara	7	6
Q	(Italy) C Rosatello	5	1
(France) C Monnet	3	0
WC	(Romania) A Todoni	6	6
Q	D Astakhova	1	2
2	(Bulgaria) V Tomova	6	6

Second round
7	(Germany) N Noha Akugue	7^{7}	6
WC	(Romania) I Amariei	6^{4}	1
Q	(Romania) MS Popa	4	1
4	(Italy) S Errani	6	6
8	(Latvia) D Semeņistaja	7	2	7^{8}
(Romania) I Bara	5	6	6^{6}
WC	(Romania) A Todoni	4	6	6
2	(Bulgaria) V Tomova	6	4	1

Quarterfinals
7	(Germany) N Noha Akugue	5	2
4	(Italy) S Errani	7	6
8	(Latvia) D Semeņistaja	7^{7}	6
WC	(Romania) A Todoni	6^{3}	4

Semifinals
4	(Italy) S Errani	6	6
8	(Latvia) D Semeņistaja	3	3

== Qualifying ==
=== Seeds ===
1. Darya Astakhova (qualified)
2. Ekaterina Makarova (first round)
3. (Belgium) Marie Benoît (qualified)
4. (Romania) Alexandra Cadanțu-Ignatik (moved to main draw)
5. (Netherlands) Suzan Lamens (qualifying competition, lucky loser)
6. (Australia) Seone Mendez (first round)
7. (Ukraine) Valeriya Strakhova (first round)
8. (Netherlands) Eva Vedder (first round)

=== Qualifiers ===
1. Darya Astakhova
2. (Romania) Maria Sara Popa
3. (Belgium) Marie Benoît
4. (Italy) Camilla Rosatello

=== Lucky loser ===
1. (Netherlands) Suzan Lamens

=== Draw ===
==== First qualifier ====
First round
1	Darya Astakhova	6	6^{3}	6
(Italy) Dalila Spiteri	0	7^{7}	1
(Germany) Ella Seidel	6	6
8	(Netherlands) Eva Vedder	1	2

Qualifying competition
1	Darya Astakhova	6	6
(Germany) Ella Seidel	4	3

==== Second qualifier ====
First round
2	Ekaterina Makarova	4	1
(Romania) Cristina Dinu	6	6
WC	(Romania) Maria Sara Popa	6	3	6
6	(Australia) Seone Mendez	2	6	4

Qualifying competition
(Romania) Cristina Dinu	4	7	4
WC	(Romania) Maria Sara Popa	6	5	6

==== Third qualifier ====
First round
3	(Belgium) Marie Benoît	6	6
(Malta) Francesca Curmi	1	3
(Hungary) Fanny Stollár	1	1
5	(Netherlands) Suzan Lamens	6	6

Qualifying competition
3	(Belgium) Marie Benoît	6	2	6
5	(Netherlands) Suzan Lamens	3	6	3

==== Fourth qualifier ====
First round
Alt	(Romania) Andreea Prisăcariu	6	6
WC	(Romania) Eva Maria Ionescu	1	3
(Italy) Camilla Rosatello	6	1	6
7	(Ukraine) Valeriya Strakhova	4	6	4

Qualifying competition
Alt	(Romania) Andreea Prisăcariu	3	6^{0}
(Italy) Camilla Rosatello	6	7^{7}
