= 2017 BRD Bucharest Open – Doubles =

Doubles
- 2017 BRD Bucharest Open

Final
- Champions: (Romania) Irina-Camelia Begu (Romania) Raluca Olaru
- Runners-up: (Belgium) Elise Mertens (Netherlands) Demi Schuurs
- Score: 6–3, 6–3

Details
- Draw: 16
- Seeds: 4

Events
Singles	Doubles
- BRD Bucharest Open

Jessica Moore and Varatchaya Wongteanchai were the defending champions, but chose not to compete together. Moore played alongside Prarthana Thombare, but lost in the quarterfinals to Irina-Camelia Begu and Raluca Olaru. Wongteanchai teamed up with Alona Fomina, but lost in the first round to Jaqueline Cristian and Cristina Dinu.

Begu and Olaru went on to win the title, defeating Elise Mertens and Demi Schuurs in the final 6–3, 6–3.

== Seeds ==
1. (Romania) Irina-Camelia Begu / (Romania) Raluca Olaru (champions)
2. (Belgium) Elise Mertens / (Netherlands) Demi Schuurs (final)
3. (Georgia (country)) Oksana Kalashnikova / (Czech Republic) Renata Voráčová (first round)
4. (Argentina) María Irigoyen / (Czech Republic) Barbora Krejčíková (first round)

== Draw ==
Key

- Q = Qualifier
- WC = Wild card
- LL = Lucky loser
- Alt = Alternate
- ITF = ITF entry
- PR = Protected ranking
- SR = Special ranking
- SE = Special exempt
- JE = Junior exempt
- JR = Junior Accelerator Programme entrant
- CO = College Accelerator Programme entrant
- NG = Next Gen Accelerator Program entrant
- w/o = Walkover
- r = Retired
- d = Defaulted

=== Draw ===
First round
1	(Romania) I-C Begu (Romania) R Olaru	6	7
(Romania) A Bogdan (Romania) E-G Ruse	3	5
(Australia) J Moore (India) P Thombare	6	6
Alt	(Romania) N Dascălu (Bulgaria) I Shinikova	4	2
4	(Argentina) M Irigoyen (Czech Republic) B Krejčíková	2	2
(Poland) K Piter (Belgium) M Zanevska	6	6
WC	(Romania) J Cristian (Romania) C Dinu	2	6	[10]
(Ukraine) A Fomina (Thailand) V Wongteanchai	6	3	[6]
(Serbia) J Jakšić (Georgia (country)) S Shapatava	5	6	[7]
(Argentina) C Pella (Argentina) N Podoroska	7	2	[10]
(Romania) I Bara (Croatia) T Mrdeža	6	6^{4}	[10]
3	(Georgia (country)) O Kalashnikova (Czech Republic) R Voráčová	3	7^{7}	[6]
(Netherlands) L Kerkhove (Netherlands) A Rus	2	4
(Romania) A Cadanțu (Montenegro) D Kovinić	6	6
WC	(Romania) G Crăciun (Romania) A Dulgheru	3	3
2	(Belgium) E Mertens (Netherlands) D Schuurs	6	6

Quarterfinals
1	(Romania) I-C Begu (Romania) R Olaru	6	6
(Australia) J Moore (India) P Thombare	0	2
(Poland) K Piter (Belgium) M Zanevska	6	7^{7}
WC	(Romania) J Cristian (Romania) C Dinu	2	6^{3}
(Argentina) C Pella (Argentina) N Podoroska	6	6
(Romania) I Bara (Croatia) T Mrdeža	3	3
(Romania) A Cadanțu (Montenegro) D Kovinić	6^{0}	0
2	(Belgium) E Mertens (Netherlands) D Schuurs	7^{7}	6

Semifinals
1	(Romania) I-C Begu (Romania) R Olaru	6	6
(Poland) K Piter (Belgium) M Zanevska	0	4
(Argentina) C Pella (Argentina) N Podoroska	2^{r}
2	(Belgium) E Mertens (Netherlands) D Schuurs	5

Final
1	(Romania) I-C Begu (Romania) R Olaru	6	6
2	(Belgium) E Mertens (Netherlands) D Schuurs	3	3
