= 2017 BRD Bucharest Open – Singles =

Singles
- 2017 BRD Bucharest Open

Final
- Champion: (Romania) Irina-Camelia Begu
- Runner-up: (Germany) Julia Görges
- Score: 6–3, 7–5

Details
- Draw: 32
- Seeds: 8

Events
Singles	Doubles
- BRD Bucharest Open

Simona Halep was the defending champion, but chose not to participate this year.

Irina-Camelia Begu won the title, defeating Julia Görges in the final, 6–3, 7–5.

== Seeds ==
1. (Latvia) Anastasija Sevastova (quarterfinals)
2. (Spain) Carla Suárez Navarro (semifinals)
3. (Germany) Julia Görges (final)
4. (Romania) Monica Niculescu (withdrew)
5. (Belgium) Elise Mertens (second round)
6. (Romania) Sorana Cîrstea (first round)
7. (Romania) Irina-Camelia Begu (champion)
8. (Germany) Tatjana Maria (quarterfinals)
9. (Russia) Ekaterina Alexandrova (second round)

== Draw ==
Key

- Q = Qualifier
- WC = Wild card
- LL = Lucky loser
- Alt = Alternate
- ITF = ITF entry
- PR = Protected ranking
- SR = Special ranking
- SE = Special exempt
- JE = Junior exempt
- JR = Junior Accelerator Programme entrant
- CO = College Accelerator Programme entrant
- NG = Next Gen Accelerator Program entrant
- w/o = Walkover
- r = Retired
- d = Defaulted

=== Finals ===
Semifinals
(Romania) Ana Bogdan	6	2	4
3	(Germany) Julia Görges	3	6	6
7	(Romania) Irina-Camelia Begu	7	7
2	(Spain) Carla Suárez Navarro	5	5

Final
3	(Germany) Julia Görges	3	5
7	(Romania) Irina-Camelia Begu	6	7

=== Top half ===
First round
1	(Latvia) A Sevastova	6	6
(Slovakia) J Čepelová	2	0
Q	(Poland) M Fręch	3	7	3
(Montenegro) D Kovinić	6	5	6
(Turkey) Ç Büyükakçay	4	6	7^{7}
PR	(Slovenia) P Hercog	6	3	6^{3}
(Romania) A Bogdan	6	6
6	(Romania) S Cîrstea	4	2
3	(Germany) J Görges	1	6	6
PR	(United States) A Glatch	6	3	1
(Belarus) A Sasnovich	6	6
WC	(Romania) I Bara	4	4
Q	(Romania) A Dulgheru	6	6
Q	(Bulgaria) S Karatantcheva	1	2
(Czech Republic) B Krejčíková	6	0	2
9	(Russia) E Alexandrova	4	6	6

Second round
1	(Latvia) A Sevastova	6	6
(Montenegro) D Kovinić	4	4
(Turkey) Ç Büyükakçay	4	5
(Romania) A Bogdan	6	7
3	(Germany) J Görges	7^{7}	6
(Belarus) A Sasnovich	6^{4}	3
Q	(Romania) A Dulgheru	6	4	6
9	(Russia) E Alexandrova	4	6	2

Quarterfinals
1	(Latvia) A Sevastova	1	3
(Romania) A Bogdan	6	6
3	(Germany) J Görges	7	7
Q	(Romania) A Dulgheru	5	5

Semifinals
(Romania) A Bogdan	6	2	4
3	(Germany) J Görges	3	6	6

=== Bottom half ===
First round
7	(Romania) I-C Begu	6	6
(Serbia) I Jorović	4	1
WC	(Romania) J Cristian	4	6	6
(Ukraine) K Kozlova	6	4	2
Q	(Netherlands) A Rus	6	1	3
(France) P Parmentier	2	6	6
(Netherlands) Q Lemoine	2	3
5	(Belgium) E Mertens	6	6
8	(Germany) T Maria	6	6
LL	(Netherlands) L Kerkhove	1	2
(Argentina) N Podoroska	6	2	6
(Belgium) M Zanevska	3	6	1
WC	(Romania) E-G Ruse	6	6
(Bulgaria) I Shinikova	2	1
(Germany) A Beck	0	1
2	(Spain) C Suárez Navarro	6	6

Second round
7	(Romania) I-C Begu	6	6
WC	(Romania) J Cristian	4	0
(France) P Parmentier	3	6	6
5	(Belgium) E Mertens	6	4	4
8	(Germany) T Maria	4
(Argentina) N Podoroska	1^{r}
WC	(Romania) E-G Ruse	3	4
2	(Spain) C Suárez Navarro	6	6

Quarterfinals
7	(Romania) I-C Begu	7	6
(France) P Parmentier	5	0
8	(Germany) T Maria	0	3
2	(Spain) C Suárez Navarro	6	6

Semifinals
7	(Romania) I-C Begu	7	7
2	(Spain) C Suárez Navarro	5	5

== Qualifying ==
=== Seeds ===
1. (Italy) Jasmine Paolini (second round)
2. (Croatia) Jana Fett (first round)
3. (Netherlands) Arantxa Rus (qualified)
4. (Romania) Alexandra Cadanțu (second round)
5. (Chile) Daniela Seguel (qualifying competition)
6. (Netherlands) Lesley Kerkhove (qualifying competition, lucky loser)
7. (Hungary) Fanny Stollár (second round)
8. (Poland) Katarzyna Piter (first round)

=== Qualifiers ===
1. (Romania) Alexandra Dulgheru
2. (Bulgaria) Sesil Karatantcheva
3. (Netherlands) Arantxa Rus
4. (Poland) Magdalena Fręch

=== Lucky loser ===
1. (Netherlands) Lesley Kerkhove

=== Draw ===
==== First qualifier ====
First round
1	(Italy) Jasmine Paolini	6	6
WC	(Hungary) Csilla Argyelán	0	1
(Canada) Gabriela Dabrowski	0	5
(Romania) Alexandra Dulgheru	6	7
(Croatia) Tereza Mrdeža	1	1
(Argentina) Catalina Pella	6	6
(Australia) Jessica Moore	6^{5}	2
5	(Chile) Daniela Seguel	7^{7}	6

Second round
1	(Italy) Jasmine Paolini	3	6	4
(Romania) Alexandra Dulgheru	6	4	6
(Argentina) Catalina Pella	1	6	3
5	(Chile) Daniela Seguel	6	3	6

Qualifying competition
(Romania) Alexandra Dulgheru	6	6
5	(Chile) Daniela Seguel	3	2

==== Second qualifier ====
First round
2	(Croatia) Jana Fett	3	6	4
(Bulgaria) Sesil Karatantcheva	6	3	6
WC	(Romania) Mihaela Mărculescu	1	4
(Ukraine) Alona Fomina	6	6
(Georgia (country)) Sofia Shapatava	6	6^{4}	6
(Serbia) Jovana Jakšić	4	7^{7}	2
WC	(Hungary) Panna Udvardy	0	2
6	(Netherlands) Lesley Kerkhove	6	6

Second round
(Bulgaria) Sesil Karatantcheva	4	6	6
(Ukraine) Alona Fomina	6	4	3
(Georgia (country)) Sofia Shapatava	6	5	4
6	(Netherlands) Lesley Kerkhove	4	7	6

Qualifying competition
(Bulgaria) Sesil Karatantcheva	1	6	6
6	(Netherlands) Lesley Kerkhove	6	3	4

==== Third qualifier ====
First round
3	(Netherlands) Arantxa Rus	6	6^{2}	6
PR	(Estonia) Kaia Kanepi	4	7^{7}	0
WC	(Romania) Georgia Crăciun	7	6
(France) Harmony Tan	5	1
(Italy) Martina Di Giuseppe	4	2
(Ukraine) Anhelina Kalinina	6	6
(Romania) Cristina Dinu	6^{3}	3
7	(Hungary) Fanny Stollár	7^{7}	6

Second round
3	(Netherlands) Arantxa Rus	6	6
WC	(Romania) Georgia Crăciun	3	2
(Ukraine) Anhelina Kalinina	6	6
7	(Hungary) Fanny Stollár	3	4

Qualifying competition
3	(Netherlands) Arantxa Rus	6	6
(Ukraine) Anhelina Kalinina	2	4

==== Fourth qualifier ====
First round
4	(Romania) Alexandra Cadanțu	6	7
(Romania) Nicoleta Dascălu	4	5
(Croatia) Tena Lukas	6	6^{2}	7
(Australia) Isabelle Wallace	0	7^{7}	5
(Russia) Anastasia Pivovarova	2	0
(Poland) Magdalena Fręch	6	6
(Thailand) Varatchaya Wongteanchai	1	7	6
8	(Poland) Katarzyna Piter	6	5	3

Second round
4	(Romania) Alexandra Cadanțu	4	6^{3}
(Croatia) Tena Lukas	6	7^{7}
(Poland) Magdalena Fręch	6	6
(Thailand) Varatchaya Wongteanchai	3	4

Qualifying competition
(Croatia) Tena Lukas	4	5
(Poland) Magdalena Fręch	6	7
