= Țiriac Foundation Trophy =

Tennis tournament

- 2024 Țiriac Foundation Trophy

Defunct tennis tournament
- Location: Bucharest, Romania
- Venue: Centrul Național de Tenis
- Category: WTA 125
- Surface: Clay (outdoor)
- Draw: 32S/16Q/8D
- Prize money: $115,000

Current champions (2024)
- Women's singles: (Romania) Miriam Bulgaru
- Women's doubles: (France) Carole Monnet (Latvia) Darja Semeņistaja

The Țiriac Foundation Trophy is a tennis WTA 125 tournament held in Bucharest, Romania since 2022.

== Past finals ==
=== Singles ===
Year	Champion	Runner-up	Score
2024	(Romania) Miriam Bulgaru	(Liechtenstein) Kathinka von Deichmann	6–3, 1–6, 6–4
2023	(Australia) Astra Sharma	(Italy) Sara Errani	0–6, 7–5, 6–2
2022	(Romania) Irina-Camelia Begu	(Hungary) Réka Luca Jani	6–3, 6–3

=== Doubles ===
Year	Champions	Runners-up	Score
2024	(France) Carole Monnet (Latvia) Darja Semeņistaja	(Spain) Aliona Bolsova (Poland) Katarzyna Kawa	1–6, 6–2, [10–7]
2023	(Italy) Angelica Moratelli (Italy) Camilla Rosatello	(Greece) Valentini Grammatikopoulou (Czech Republic) Anna Sisková	7–5, 6–4
2022	(Spain) Aliona Bolsova (Venezuela) Andrea Gámiz	(Hungary) Réka Luca Jani (Hungary) Panna Udvardy	7–5, 6–3

== See also ==
- List of tennis tournaments
