= 2017 BRD Bucharest Open =

- Date: 17–23 July
- Edition: 4th
- Category: WTA International
- Draw: 32S / 16D
- Prize money: $250,000
- Surface: Clay
- Location: Bucharest, Romania
- Venue: Arenele BNR

Champions

Singles
- (Romania) Irina-Camelia Begu

Doubles
- (Romania) Irina-Camelia Begu / (Romania) Raluca Olaru
- BRD Bucharest Open

The 2017 BRD Bucharest Open was a women's professional tennis tournament played on red clay courts. It was the fourth edition of the tournament and was part of the WTA International category of the 2017 WTA Tour. It took place at Arenele BNR in Bucharest, Romania from 17 July until 24 July 2017. Seventh-seeded Irina-Camelia Begu won the singles title.

== Finals ==
=== Singles ===
- (Romania) Irina-Camelia Begu defeated (Germany) Julia Görges, 6–3, 7–5

=== Doubles ===
- (Romania) Irina-Camelia Begu / (Romania) Raluca Olaru defeated (Belgium) Elise Mertens / (Netherlands) Demi Schuurs, 6–3, 6–3

== Points and prize money ==
=== Point distribution ===
| Event | W | F | SF | QF | Round of 16 | Round of 32 | Q | Q3 | Q2 | Q1 |
| Singles | 280 | 180 | 110 | 60 | 30 | 1 | 18 | 14 | 10 | 1 |
| Doubles | 280 | 180 | 110 | 60 | 1 | —N/a | —N/a | —N/a | —N/a | —N/a |

=== Prize money ===
| Event | W | F | SF | QF | Round of 16 | Round of 32 | Q3 | Q2 | Q1 |
| Singles | $43,000 | $21,400 | $11,300 | $5,900 | $3,310 | $1,925 | $1,005 | $730 | $530 |
| Doubles | $12,300 | $6,400 | $3,435 | $1,820 | $960 | —N/a | —N/a | —N/a | |

== Singles main-draw entrants ==
=== Seeds ===
| Country | Player | Rank^{1} | Seed |
|---|---|---|---|
| LAT | Anastasija Sevastova | 19 | 1 |
| ESP | Carla Suárez Navarro | 27 | 2 |
| GER | Julia Görges | 45 | 3 |
| ~~ROU~~ | ~~Monica Niculescu~~ | ~~51~~ | ~~4~~ |
| BEL | Elise Mertens | 54 | 5 |
| ROU | Sorana Cîrstea | 63 | 6 |
| ROU | Irina-Camelia Begu | 64 | 7 |
| GER | Tatjana Maria | 74 | 8 |
| RUS | Ekaterina Alexandrova | 75 | 9 |

- ^{1} Rankings as of 3 July 2017.

=== Other entrants ===
The following players received wildcards into the main draw:

- (Romania) Irina Bara
- (Romania) Jaqueline Cristian
- (Romania) Elena-Gabriela Ruse

The following players received entry using a protected ranking:

- (United States) Alexa Glatch
- (Slovenia) Polona Hercog

The following players received entry from the qualifying draw:

- (Romania) Alexandra Dulgheru
- (Poland) Magdalena Fręch
- (Bulgaria) Sesil Karatantcheva
- (Netherlands) Arantxa Rus

The following player received entry as a lucky loser:

- (Netherlands) Lesley Kerkhove

=== Withdrawals ===
Before the tournament

- (Russia) Anna Blinkova →replaced by (Argentina) Nadia Podoroska
- (France) Océane Dodin →replaced by (Turkey) Çağla Büyükakçay
- (Tunisia) Ons Jabeur →replaced by (Netherlands) Quirine Lemoine
- (Slovakia) Kristína Kučová →replaced by (Slovenia) Polona Hercog
- (United States) Varvara Lepchenko →replaced by (United States) Alexa Glatch
- (United States) Christina McHale →replaced by (Ukraine) Kateryna Kozlova
- (Romania) Monica Niculescu →replaced by (Netherlands) Lesley Kerkhove
- (Kazakhstan) Yulia Putintseva →replaced by (Czech Republic) Barbora Krejčíková

=== Retirements ===
- (Argentina) Nadia Podoroska

== Doubles main-draw entrants ==
=== Seeds ===
| Country | Player | Country | Player | Rank^{1} | Seed |
|---|---|---|---|---|---|
| ROU | Irina-Camelia Begu | ROU | Raluca Olaru | 113 | 1 |
| BEL | Elise Mertens | NED | Demi Schuurs | 132 | 2 |
| GEO | Oksana Kalashnikova | CZE | Renata Voráčová | 143 | 3 |
| ARG | María Irigoyen | CZE | Barbora Krejčíková | 153 | 4 |

- ^{1} Rankings as of 3 July 2017.

=== Other entrants ===
The following pairs received wildcards into the main draw:

- (Romania) Georgia Crăciun / (Romania) Alexandra Dulgheru
- (Romania) Jaqueline Cristian / (Romania) Cristina Dinu

The following pair received entry as alternates:

- (Romania) Nicoleta Dascălu / (Bulgaria) Isabella Shinikova

=== Withdrawals ===
Before the tournament

- (Hungary) Fanny Stollár
