= 2022 Țiriac Foundation Trophy – Doubles =

Doubles
- 2022 Țiriac Foundation Trophy

Final
- Champions: (Spain) Aliona Bolsova (Venezuela) Andrea Gámiz
- Runners-up: (Hungary) Réka Luca Jani (Hungary) Panna Udvardy
- Score: 7–5, 6–3

Events
Singles	Doubles
BCR Open Romania Ladies	· 2023 →

This was the first edition of the tournament.

Aliona Bolsova and Andrea Gámiz won the title, defeating Réka Luca Jani and Panna Udvardy in the final, 7–5, 6–3.

== Seeds ==
1. (Spain) Aliona Bolsova / (Venezuela) Andrea Gámiz (champions)
2. (Romania) Raluca Olaru / (Brazil) Laura Pigossi (quarterfinals)

== Draw ==
=== Key ===
- Q = Qualifier
- WC = Wild card
- LL = Lucky loser
- Alt = Alternate
- SE = Special exempt
- PR = Protected ranking
- ITF = ITF entry
- JE = Junior exempt
- w/o = Walkover
- r = Retired
- d = Defaulted
- SR = Special ranking

=== Draw ===
Quarterfinals
1	(Spain) A Bolsova (Venezuela) A Gámiz	6	7^{7}
(United States) J Aney (United States) C Rosca	3	6^{5}
(Poland) P Kania-Choduń (Czech Republic) R Voráčová	7^{7}	4	[10]
WC	(Romania) G Crăciun (Romania) C Dinu	6^{4}	6	[8]
(Romania) I Bara (Romania) G Lee	6	2	[8]
(Czech Republic) A Dețiuc (Czech Republic) M Kolodziejová	3	6	[10]
(Hungary) RL Jani (Hungary) P Udvardy	7	6
2	(Romania) R Olaru (Brazil) L Pigossi	5	0

Semifinals
1	(Spain) A Bolsova (Venezuela) A Gámiz	5	6	[10]
(Poland) P Kania-Choduń (Czech Republic) R Voráčová	7	4	[4]
(Czech Republic) A Dețiuc (Czech Republic) M Kolodziejová	1	2
(Hungary) RL Jani (Hungary) P Udvardy	6	6

Final
1	(Spain) A Bolsova (Venezuela) A Gámiz	7	6
(Hungary) RL Jani (Hungary) P Udvardy	5	3
