= Marie Benoît =

Belgian tennis player (born 1995)

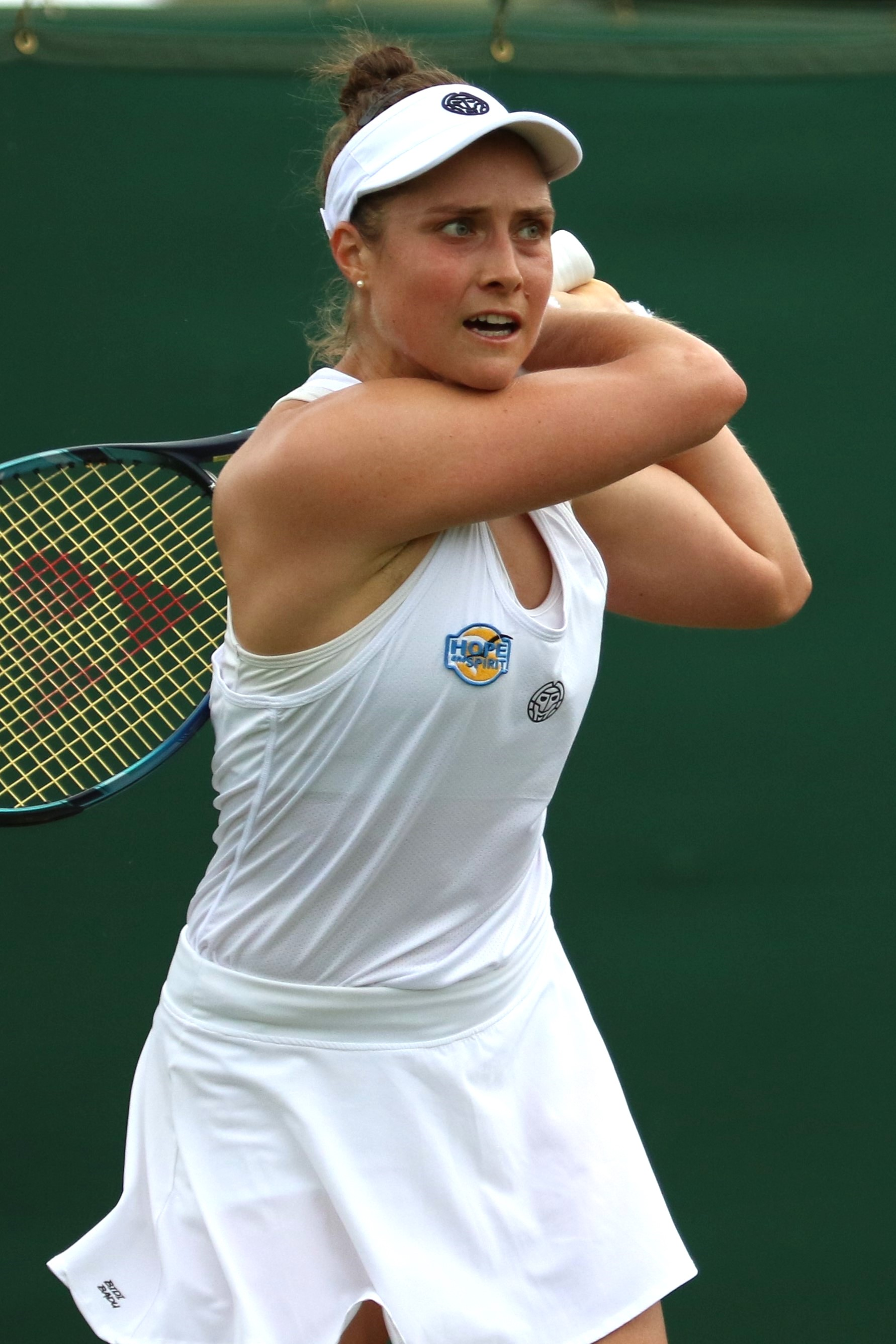
- Benoit at the 2023 Wimbledon Championships
- Country (sports): Belgium
- Born: 16 March 1995 (age 31) Eupen, Belgium
- Plays: Left-handed (two-handed backhand)
- Prize money: US$ 439,845

Singles
- Career record: 456–305
- Career titles: 15 ITF
- Highest ranking: No. 188 (24 July 2023)

Grand Slam singles results
- Australian Open: Q2 (2021, 2025)
- French Open: Q2 (2021)
- Wimbledon: Q1 (2021, 2023)
- US Open: Q1 (2021, 2023)

Doubles
- Career record: 207–141
- Career titles: 14 ITF
- Highest ranking: No. 208 (18 October 2021)

Marie Benoît (French pronunciation: [maʁi bənwa]; born 16 March 1995) is a Belgian former professional tennis player. On 24 July 2023, she achieved her best singles ranking of world No. 188. On 18 October 2021, she peaked at No. 208 in the WTA doubles rankings.

Benoît won 15 singles and 14 doubles titles on the ITF Women's Circuit.

Playing for the Belgium Fed Cup team, Benoît has a win–loss record of 1–3.

== Career ==
=== 2019: WTA Tour debut ===
Benoît's singles debut on the WTA Tour came at the 2019 Internationaux de Strasbourg, where she was defeated in the first round by Ukrainian player Marta Kostyuk. In doubles, she made her debut at the 2019 Bucharest Open, when she lost with her partner Ysaline Bonaventure in the first round.

=== 2020-2022: First WTA 125 doubles final ===
In 2020, she reached the final of a WTA 125 Challenger event, partnering with Jessika Ponchet. The following year was marked by participating in all four Grand Slam qualifying tournaments, twice reaching the second round. In 2021, she reached semifinals in a $25k tournament in Grenoble, France, losing to Viktorija Golubic. In a tournament in Santa Margherita di Pula, Italy, she lost the final against Arantxa Rus. In August 2022, she won a $25k event in Koksijde, Belgium, one week after reaching the final in the $25k tournament organised in her hometown of Eupen.

=== 2023-2024: First WTA 125 singles quarterfinal ===
Benoît qualified for main draw at the 2023 Țiriac Foundation Trophy in Bucharest and defeated Chloé Paquet in three sets to reach the second round, where she lost to fifth seed Anna Bondár. She also made it through qualification for the 2024 Hamburg Open, but lost in the first round to top seed Mayar Sherif.

At the 2024 Țiriac Foundation Trophy, Benoît reached her first WTA 125 singles quarterfinal defeating Leonie Küng and Valentina Ryser, before losing to Ekaterine Gorgodze.

== WTA 125 finals ==
=== Doubles: 1 (runner-up) ===
Result	Date	Tournament	Surface	Partner	Opponents	Score
Loss	Feb 2020	Newport Beach Challenger, United States	Hard	(France) Jessika Ponchet	(United States) Hayley Carter (Brazil) Luisa Stefani	1–6, 3–6

== ITF Circuit finals ==
=== Singles: 27 (15 titles, 12 runner-ups) ===
Legend W60 tournaments (1–0) W25/35 tournaments (9–7) W10/15 tournaments (5–5)	Finals by surface Hard (3–1) Clay (12–11)

Result	W–L	Date	Tournament	Tier	Surface	Opponent	Score
Win	1–0	Nov 2012	ITF Antalya, Turkey	W10	Clay	(Romania) Laura Ioana Andrei	6–3, 6–2
Win	2–0	Jul 2013	ITF Iași, Romania	W10	Clay	(Romania) Raluca Elena Platon	6–3, 7–6^{(0)}
Win	3–0	Oct 2013	ITF Antalya, Turkey	W10	Clay	(Moldova) Anastasia Vdovenco	6–1, 6–1
Win	4–0	Feb 2014	ITF Sharm El Sheikh, Egypt	W10	Hard	(China) Gai Ao	6–3, 6–4
Loss	4–1	Sep 2014	ITF Santa Margherita di Pula, Italy	W10	Clay	(Italy) Martina Trevisan	4–6, 3–6
Loss	4–2	Feb 2015	ITF El Kantaoui, Tunisia	W10	Hard	(Bulgaria) Isabella Shinikova	2–6, 7–5, 1–6
Win	5–2	Feb 2015	ITF El Kantaoui, Tunisia	W10	Hard	(Spain) Cristina Sanchez-Quintanar	6–7^{(6)}, 6–3, 6–3
Win	6–2	Sep 2015	ITF Alphen a/d Rijn, Netherlands	W25	Clay	(Croatia) Tena Lukas	5–7, 6–3, 6–4
Loss	6–3	Jul 2017	ITF Tampere, Finland	W15	Clay	(Czech Republic) Monika Kilnarová	6–7^{(5)}, 7–6^{(5)}, 4–6
Loss	6–4	Aug 2017	ITF Vrnjačka Banja, Serbia	W15	Clay	(Romania) Oana Gavrilă	7–6^{(3)}, 4–6, 5–7
Loss	6–5	Oct 2017	ITF Seville, Spain	W25	Clay	(Chile) Daniela Seguel	6–2, 1–6, 2–6
Loss	6–6	Nov 2017	ITF Hammamet, Tunisia	W15	Clay	(Italy) Gaia Sanesi	3–6, 0–6
Win	7–6	Oct 2018	ITF Riba-Roja de Turia, Spain	W25	Clay	(Spain) Aliona Bolsova	6–0, 7–6^{(2)}
Loss	7–7	Oct 2019	ITF Riba-Roja de Turia	W25	Clay	(Spain) Andrea Lázaro García	6–7^{(4)}, 5–7
Win	8–7	Jan 2020	ITF Daytona Beach, United States	W25	Clay	(Spain) Andrea Lázaro García	6–4, 6–0
Loss	8–8	May 2022	ITF Santa Margherita di Pula, Italy	W25	Clay	(Netherlands) Arantxa Rus	4–6, 4–6
Loss	8–9	Aug 2022	ITF Eupen, Belgium	W25	Clay	(Czech Republic) Aneta Kučmová	5–7, 4–6
Win	9–9	Aug 2022	ITF Koksijde, Belgium	W25	Clay	(Argentina) Julia Riera	7–5, 6–3
Win	10–9	Jan 2023	Vero Beach Open, United States	W60	Clay	(United States) Emma Navarro	6–2, 7–5
Win	11–9	Feb 2023	GB Pro-Series Glasgow, UK	W25	Hard (i)	(United Kingdom) Heather Watson	3–6, 6–4, 6–1
Win	12–9	Jul 2023	ITF Aschaffenburg, Germany	W25	Clay	(Czech Republic) Julie Štruplová	6–3, 6–3
Win	13–9	Jan 2024	ITF Naples, United States	W35	Clay	(Switzerland) Leonie Küng	6–4, 1–6, 6–4
Loss	13–10	Feb 2024	ITF Hammamet, Tunisia	W35	Clay	(Croatia) Lucija Ćirić Bagarić	2–6, 5–7
Loss	13–11	Apr 2024	ITF Hammamet, Tunisia	W35	Clay	(Slovakia) Nina Vargová	3–6, 6–2, 2–6
Win	14–11	May 2024	ITF Annenheim, Austria	W35	Clay	(Czech Republic) Tereza Valentová	7–5, 3–6, 7–5
Win	15–11	May 2024	ITF Klagenfurt, Austria	W35	Clay	(Belgium) Sofia Costoulas	6–1, 6–3
Loss	15–12	Oct 2024	ITF Seville, Spain	W35	Clay	(Austria) Sinja Kraus	6–2, 2–6, 3–6

=== Doubles: 29 (14 titles, 15 runner-ups) ===
Legend W60/75 tournaments (1–0) W50 tournaments (1–0) W25/35 tournaments (10–7) W10/15 tournaments (2–8)	Finals by surface Hard (2–2) Clay (11–12) Carpet (1–1)

Result	W–L	Date	Tournament	Tier	Surface	Partner	Opponents	Score
Loss	0–1	Aug 2011	ITF Rebecq, Belgium	W10	Hard	(Belgium) Kimberley Zimmermann	(Netherlands) Kim Kilsdonk (Netherlands) Nicolette van Uitert	2–6, 2–6
Loss	0–2	Aug 2013	ITF Koksijde, Belgium	W25	Clay	(Belgium) Kimberley Zimmermann	(Belgium) Magali Kempen (Belgium) Nicky van Dyck	3–6, 6–7^{(3)}
Loss	0–3	Oct 2013	ITF Antalya, Turkey	W10	Clay	(Belgium) Kimberley Zimmermann	(Netherlands) Quirine Lemoine (Netherlands) Gabriela van de Graaf	3–6, 6–0, [7–10]
Loss	0–4	Apr 2014	ITF Heraklion, Greece	W10	Hard	(Belgium) Kimberley Zimmermann	(Russia) Polina Leykina (Greece) Despina Papamichail	2–6, 2–6
Loss	0–5	Sep 2014	ITF Santa Margherita di Pula, Italy	W10	Clay	(Belgium) Kimberley Zimmermann	(Italy) Alice Balducci (Italy) Georgia Brescia	6–3, 0–6, [5–10]
Loss	0–6	Sep 2014	ITF Santa Margherita di Pula, Italy	W10	Clay	(Belgium) Kimberley Zimmermann	(Italy) Verena Hofer (Italy) Martina Pratesi	4–6, 5–7
Loss	0–7	Oct 2014	ITF Santa Margherita di Pula, Italy	W10	Clay	(Belgium) Kimberley Zimmermann	(Germany) Anna Klasen (Germany) Charlotte Klasen	3–6, 6–4, [8–10]
Win	1–7	Nov 2014	ITF Sharm El Sheikh, Egypt	W25	Hard	(Netherlands) Demi Schuurs	(Russia) Valentyna Ivakhnenko (Russia) Polina Monova	6–4, 7–5
Win	2–7	Apr 2016	Wiesbaden Open, Germany	W25	Clay	(Netherlands) Arantxa Rus	(Belgium) Steffi Distelmans (Netherlands) Demi Schuurs	6–2, 6–2
Loss	2–8	Apr 2017	ITF Antalya, Turkey	W15	Clay	(Belgium) Ysaline Bonaventure	(Finland) Emma Laine (Japan) Yuuki Tanaka	6–3, 1–6, [4–10]
Loss	2–9	Jul 2017	Tampere Open, Finland	W15	Clay	(France) Estelle Cascino	(Russia) Anna Iakovleva (Ukraine) Gyulnara Nazarova	w/o
Loss	2–10	Aug 2017	ITF Koksijde, Belgium	W25	Clay	(Belgium) Magali Kempen	(India) Ankita Raina (Netherlands) Bibiane Schoofs	6–3, 3–6, [9–11]
Win	3–10	Dec 2017	ITF Hammamet, Tunisia	W15	Clay	(Bulgaria) Julia Terziyska	(Italy) Anna-Giulia Remondina (Serbia) Milana Špremo	6–2, 6–3
Loss	3–11	Apr 2018	ITF Santa Margherita di Pula, Italy	W25	Clay	(China) Xu Shilin	(Australia) Naiktha Bains (United States) Chiara Scholl	4–6, 5–7
Win	4–11	May 2018	ITF Hammamet, Tunisia	W15	Clay	(Italy) Angelica Moratelli	(Russia) Ulyana Ayzatulina (Germany) Julyette Steur	6–3, 6–4
Win	5–11	Sep 2018	ITF Sofia, Bulgaria	W25	Clay	(France) Manon Arcangioli	(Russia) Amina Anshba (Russia) Polina Monova	6–4, 7–6^{(5)}
Loss	5–12	Feb 2019	AK Ladies Open, Germany	W25	Carpet (i)	(Poland) Katarzyna Piter	(Spain) Cristina Bucșa (Netherlands) Rosalie van der Hoek	7–5, 3–6, [10–12]
Loss	5–13	Oct 2019	ITF Riba-Roja de Turia, Spain	W25	Clay	(Romania) Ioana Loredana Roșca	(Spain) Lara Arruabarrena (Italy) Sara Errani	6–3, 4–6, [8–10]
Win	6–13	Oct 2019	ITF Seville, Spain	W25	Clay	(Germany) Julia Wachaczyk	(Spain) Eva Guerrero Álvarez (Netherlands) Arantxa Rus	6–0, 6–7^{(3)}, [10–4]
Win	7–13	Sep 2020	ITF Tarvisio, Italy	W25	Clay	(Romania) Alexandra Cadanțu	(Hungary) Anna Bondár (Argentina) Paula Ormaechea	6–1, 6–3
Win	8–13	Jun 2021	ITF The Hague, Netherlands	W25	Clay	(Romania) Ioana Loredana Roșca	(Mexico) María Portillo Ramírez (Hungary) Panna Udvardy	6–7^{(5)}, 7–5, [10–7]
Win	9–13	Sep 2021	ITF Santarém, Portugal	W25	Hard	(United Kingdom) Eden Silva	(United Kingdom) Alicia Barnett (United Kingdom) Olivia Nicholls	7–5, 6–1
Win	10–13	Feb 2022	ITF Antalya, Turkey	W25	Clay	(Russia) Amina Anshba	(Romania) Andreea Roșca (Romania) Ioana Loredana Roșca	7–5, 7–6^{(4)}
Loss	10–14	Mar 2022	ITF Antalya, Turkey	W25	Clay	(Romania) Nicoleta Dascălu	(Japan) Funa Kozaki (Japan) Naho Sato	2–6, 4–6
Loss	10–15	Apr 2023	ITF Santa Margherita di Pula, Italy	W25	Clay	(Bosnia and Herzegovina) Dea Herdzelas	(Italy) Alessandra Teodosescu (Italy) Federica Urgesi	4–6, 3–6
Win	11–15	Jan 2024	ITF Naples, United States	W35	Clay	(Switzerland) Leonie Küng	(Japan) Mayuka Aikawa (Chinese Taipei) Hsu Chieh-yu	6–7^{(6)}, 6–2, [10–8]
Win	12–15	Jun 2024	ITF Ystad, Sweden	W50	Clay	(Netherlands) Lesley Pattinama Kerkhove	(Russia) Alevtina Ibragimova (Russia) Anna Zyryanova	6–3, 6–1
Win	13–15	Oct 2024	ITF Heraklion, Greece	W35	Clay	(Russia) Ekaterina Makarova	(Brazil) Luiza Fullana (Greece) Michaela Laki	7–6^{(4)}, 6–1
Win	14–15	Feb 2025	AK Ladies Open, Germany	W75	Carpet (i)	(Slovenia) Dalila Jakupović	(United Kingdom) Emily Appleton (Netherlands) Isabelle Haverlag	7–5, 7–6^{(6)}
