= Maria Sara Popa =

Romanian tennis player (born 2005)

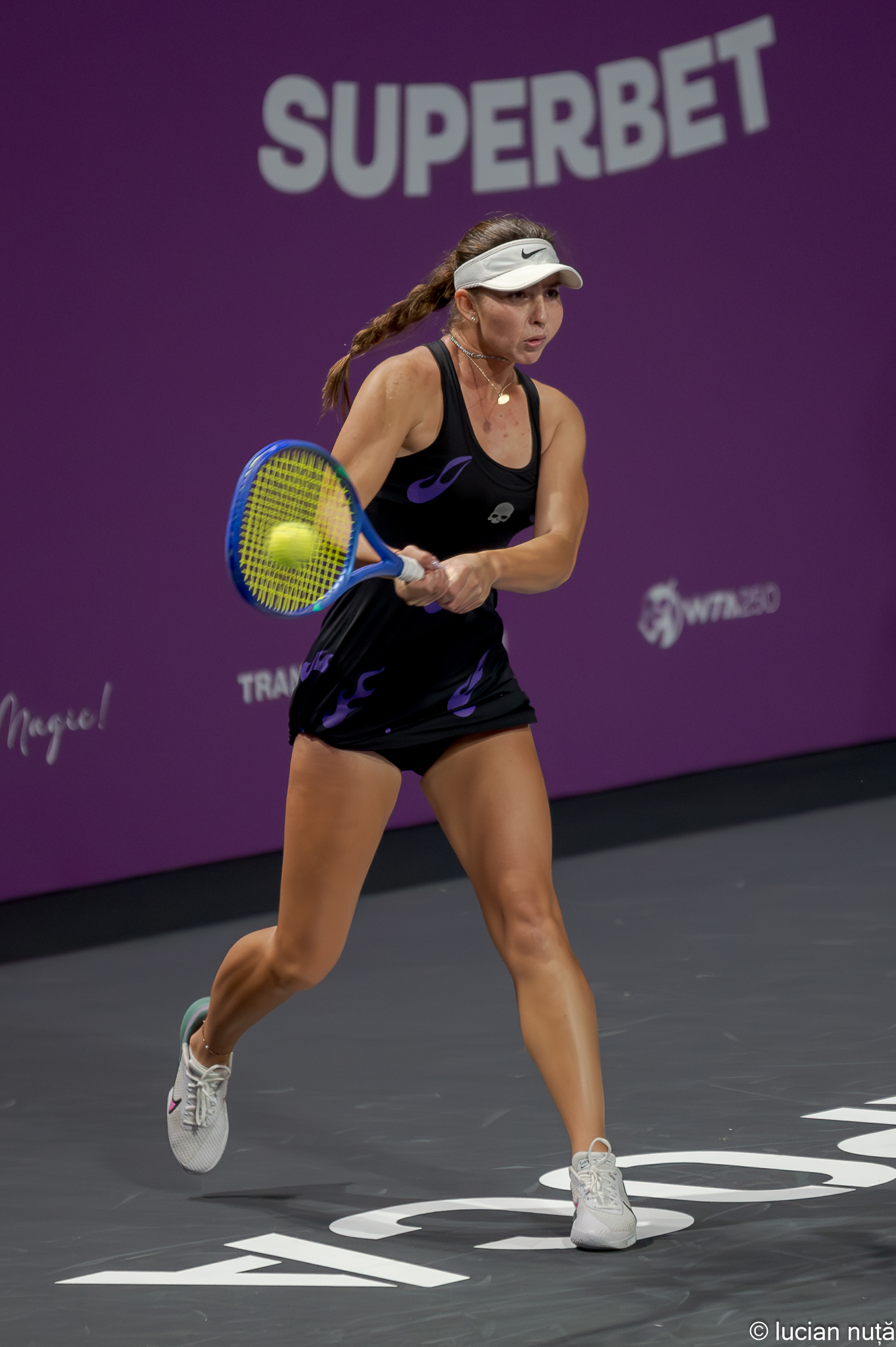
- Popa at the 2025 Transylvania Open
- Country (sports): Romania
- Residence: Bucharest, Romania
- Born: 29 July 2005 (age 21) Bucharest
- Height: 1.73 m (5 ft 8 in)
- Plays: Left (two-handed backhand)
- Coach: Ioan Raul Popa
- Prize money: $77,059

Singles
- Career record: 191–149
- Career titles: 4 ITF
- Highest ranking: No. 395 (29 July 2024)
- Current ranking: No. 454 (26 October 2026)

Doubles
- Career record: 19–33
- Career titles: 1 ITF
- Highest ranking: No. 938 (22 May 2023)
- Current ranking: No. 1,072 (26 October 2026)
- Last updated on: 26 October 2026.

Maria Sara Popa (born 29 July 2005) is a Romanian tennis player. She reached No. 1 in the Tennis Europe U14 rankings, in May 2019 and has a career-high of No. 9 in the ITF Women's World Tennis Tour junior rankings, achieved in April 2022.

Popa, who began playing at the age of four, has a career-high singles ranking by the WTA of 395. She is one of only six women who played three ITF singles finals in 2023, at such a young age, winning one of them and is among the world's youngest 20 players in WTA's Top 600. Of all the players from her country, Popa holds the record of being the youngest Romanian with an ITF Women's singles final in the last six years and the only one to have reached No. 1 in the Tennis Europe U14 rankings since 2013. She is coached by her father, Ioan Raul Popa.

The best result she's had in big tournaments so far was in the WTA 125 event held in her hometown. She was awarded a wildcard into the qualifying draw of the 2023 Țiriac Foundation Trophy, based on her results from the local ITF events. She won three matches, before losing to Sara Errani in the round of 16.

== ITF Circuit finals ==
=== Singles: 6 (4 titles, 2 runner-ups) ===
Legend W35 tournaments (1–0) W15 tournaments (3–2)	Finals by surface Clay (4–2)

Result	W–L	Date	Tournament	Tier	Surface	Opponent	Score
Loss	0–1	May 2023	ITF Antalya, Turkiye	W15	Clay	(Germany) Natalia Siedliska	3–6, 2–6
Loss	0–2	Jul 2023	ITF Bacău, Romania	W15	Clay	(Belgium) Amelie Van Impe	2–6, 1–6
Win	1–2	Aug 2023	ITF Brașov, Romania	W15	Clay	(Romania) Selma Cadâr	5–7, 6–2, 7–5
Win	2–2	Jan 2024	ITF Buenos Aires, Argentina	W35	Clay	(Switzerland) Ylena In-Albon	6–2, 6–0
Win	3–2	Dec 2025	ITF Antalya, Turkiye	W15	Clay	(Romania) Sara Bălan	1–0 ret.
Win	4–2	Aug 2026	ITF Bucharest, Romania	W15	Clay	(Germany) Ida Wobker	6-4 6-4

=== Doubles: 1 (title) ===
Legend W15 tournaments (1–0)	Finals by surface Clay (1–0)

Result	W–L	Date	Tournament	Tier	Surface	Partner	Opponents	Score
Win	1–0	Dec 2025	ITF Antalya, Turkiye	W15	Clay	(Morocco) Diae El Jardi	(Iran) Meshkatolzahra Safi (China) Xu Jiayu	6–4, 3–6, [13–11]

== ITF Junior Circuit finals ==
Legend
Category G3
Category G4
Category G5

=== Singles: 2 (1 title, 1 runner-up) ===
Result	W–L	Date	Tournament	Grade	Surface	Opponent	Score
Loss	0–1	Sep 2020	ITF Oradea, Romania	G4	Clay	(Romania) Cara Meșter	4–6, 7–6^{(7-0)}, 5–7
Win	1–1	Jan 2021	ITF Antalya, Turkey	G3	Clay	(Turkey) Melis Uyar	6–3, 6–2

=== Doubles: 2 (1 title, 1 runner-up) ===
Result	W–L	Date	Tournament	Grade	Surface	Partner	Opponents	Score
Win	1–0	Sep 2020	ITF Constanța, Romania	G5	Clay	(Romania) Vanessa Popa Teiușanu	(Romania) Anca Todoni (Romania) Floriana Popovici	7–5, 6–4
Loss	1–1	Sep 2020	ITF Oradea, Romania	G4	Clay	(Romania) Vanessa Popa Teiușanu	(Romania) Ștefania Bojică (Romania) Cara Meșter	0–6, 1–6

== Tennis Europe finals and summary ==
Popa won five out of the nine singles finals she played on this circuit and two out of the eight she played in doubles. The last title she won in May 2019 was also the title which helped her achieve the No. 1 position in the U14 age category.

Overall singles record: 124-46 (72.9%)

Overall doubles record: 47-27 (63.5%)

== UTR Pro Tennis Tour finals and summary ==
The Universal Tennis Rating (UTR) Pro Tennis Tour is an alternative to the WTA and ITF tours. Popa reached the final in both tournaments that she played. She lost the first one to Ioana Gaspar in May 2022 and the second one to Alisa Baranovska in June 2023.

Overall record: 8-4 (66.7%), including group stage matches.
