= Miriam Bulgaru =

Romanian tennis player

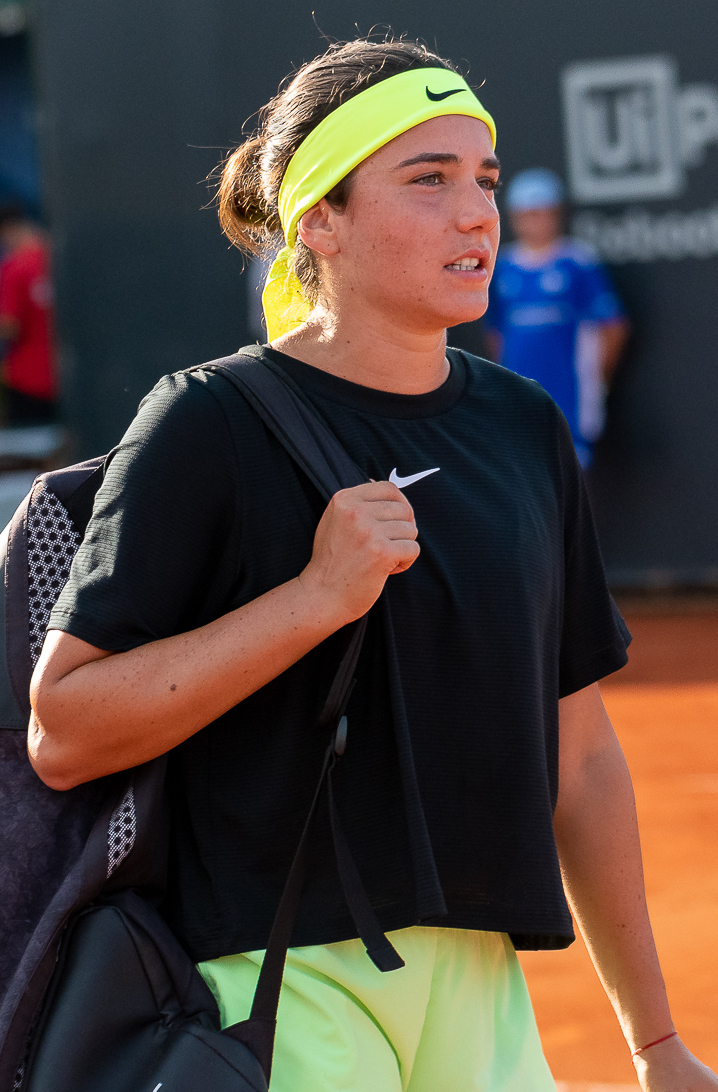
- Bulgaru at 2021 Winners Open
- Full name: Miriam Bianca Bulgaru
- Country (sports): Romania
- Born: 8 October 1998 (age 28) Alba Iulia, Romania
- Plays: Right (two-handed backhand)
- Prize money: $561,409

Singles
- Career record: 340–260
- Career titles: 1 WTA Challenger, 7 ITF
- Highest ranking: No. 168 (8 September 2025)
- Current ranking: No. 322 (31 August 2026)

Grand Slam singles results
- Australian Open: Q2 (2025)
- French Open: Q3 (2025)
- Wimbledon: Q1 (2024, 2025)
- US Open: Q1 (2023, 2024)

Doubles
- Career record: 68–77
- Career titles: 3 ITF
- Highest ranking: No. 371 (14 June 2021)
- Current ranking: No. 1,820 (31 August 2026)
- Last updated on: 7 September 2026.

Miriam Bianca Bulgaru (born 8 October 1998) is a Romanian tennis player. She achieved in 2025 a career-high singles ranking of world No. 168.

== Career overview ==
Bulgaru made her WTA Tour debut at the 2018 Bucharest Open, after having received a wildcard into the singles draw. She lost her first-round match to Wang Yafan.

She had her first tour match win as a wildcard at the 2023 Transylvania Open in Cluj Napoca, defeating Turkish lucky loser İpek Öz.

At the 2024 Iași Open, she recorded another match win in straight sets over second seed Tatjana Maria as a wildcard.

She won the 2024 Țiriac Foundation Trophy defeating Kathinka von Deichmann in the final. It was her first title at the WTA 125-level.

Bulgaru made her debut for the Romania Billie Jean King Cup team against Canada in the 2025 qualifying round held in Tokyo, losing to Victoria Mboko in the opening singles match.

== Grand Slam performance timelines ==
Key
W	F	SF	QF	#R	RR	Q#	DNQ	A	NH

(W) winner; (F) finalist; (SF) semifinalist; (QF) quarterfinalist; (#R) rounds 4, 3, 2, 1; (RR) round-robin stage; (Q#) qualification round; (DNQ) did not qualify; (A) absent; (NH) not held; (SR) strike rate (events won / competed); (W–L) win–loss record.
To avoid confusion and double counting, these charts are updated at the conclusion of a tournament or when the player's participation has ended.

=== Singles ===
Current through the 2026 French Open.

Tournament	2023	2024	2025	2026	W–L
Australian Open	A	Q1	Q2	Q1	0–0
French Open	Q2	Q2	Q3	Q1	0–0
Wimbledon	A	Q1	Q1		0–0
US Open	Q1	Q1	A		0–0
Win–loss	0–0	0–0	0–0	0–0	0–0

== WTA 125 finals ==
=== Singles: 1 (title) ===
Result	Date	Tournament	Surface	Opponent	Score
Win	Sep 2024	Open Romania Ladies, Romania	Clay	(Liechtenstein) Kathinka von Deichmann	6–3, 1–6, 6–4

== ITF Circuit finals ==
=== Singles: 19 (7 titles, 12 runner-ups) ===
Legend
W60/75 tournaments
W50 tournaments
W25/35 tournaments
W10/15 tournaments

Result	W–L	Date	Tournament	Tier	Surface	Opponent	Score
Loss	0–1	May 2016	ITF Galați, Romania	10k	Clay	(Moldova) Alexandra Perper	2–6, 6–1, 6–7^{(5)}
Win	1–1	May 2016	ITF Galați, Romania	10k	Clay	(Romania) Oana Georgeta Simion	6–3, 6–1
Loss	1–2	Jul 2017	ITF Târgu Jiu, Romania	15k	Clay	(Italy) Gaia Sanesi	1–6, 2–6
Win	2–2	Sep 2017	ITF Varna, Bulgaria	15k	Clay	(Romania) Cristina Adamescu	6–0, 7–6^{(5)}
Loss	2–3	Nov 2017	ITF Vinaròs, Spain	15k	Clay	(Spain) Irene Burillo	2–6, 5–7
Win	3–3	Jul 2018	ITF Curtea de Argeș, Romania	15k	Clay	(Romania) Andreea Mitu	6–4, 7–5
Loss	3–4	Feb 2019	ITF Monastir, Tunisia	W15	Hard	(Switzerland) Lara Michel	2–6, 3–6
Loss	3–5	Sep 2019	ITF Vienna, Austria	W25	Clay	(Croatia) Tena Lukas	7–5, 4–6, 3–6
Win	4–5	Feb 2021	ITF Antalya, Turkey	W15	Clay	(South Korea) Park So-hyun	6–2, 6–3
Win	5–5	Sep 2022	ITF Otočec, Slovenia	W25	Clay	(Argentina) Paula Ormaechea	7–5, 6–4
Loss	5–6	Oct 2022	ITF Otočec, Slovenia	W25	Clay	Iryna Shymanovich	3–6, 6–3, 3–6
Loss	5–7	Nov 2022	ITF Heraklion, Greece	W25	Clay	(North Macedonia) Lina Gjorcheska	3–6, 4–6
Loss	5–8	Apr 2023	ITF Santa Margherita di Pula, Italy	W25	Clay	(Romania) Andreea Prisăcariu	6–3, 2–6, 2–6
Loss	5–9	May 2023	ITF Annenheim, Austria	W25	Clay	(Czech Republic) Jesika Malečková	2–6, 0–6
Loss	5–10	Sep 2023	Vienna Ladies Open, Austria	W60	Clay	(Croatia) Tena Lukas	5–7, 1–6
Win	6–10	Aug 2025	ITF Kuršumlijska Banja, Serbia	W35	Clay	(North Macedonia) Lina Gjorcheska	5–7, 6–1, 6–0
Win	7–10	Aug 2025	ITF Bistrița, Romania	W50	Clay	(Portugal) Matilde Jorge	6–0, 6–3
Loss	7–11	Sep 2025	Ladies Open Vienna, Austria	W75	Clay	(Austria) Sinja Kraus	6–3, 2–6, 3–6
Loss	7–12	Nov 2026	ITF Chihuahua, Mexico	W50	Hard	(Canada) Kayla Cross	7–6^{(5)}, 5–7, 3–6

=== Doubles: 8 (3 titles, 5 runner-ups) ===
Legend
W25 tournaments
W15 tournaments

Result	W–L	Date	Tournament	Tier	Surface	Partner	Opponents	Score
Loss	0–1	Feb 2017	ITF Sharm El Sheikh, Egypt	15k	Hard	(Romania) Elena Bogdan	(Belgium) Britt Geukens (Belgium) Magali Kempen	3–6, 6–2, [7–10]
Loss	0–2	Jun 2017	ITF Bucharest, Romania	15k	Clay	(Romania) Elena Bogdan	(Romania) Cristina Ene (Moldova) Alexandra Perper	6–4, 3–6, [4–10]
Win	1–2	Nov 2018	ITF Sant Cugat, Spain	25k	Clay	(Romania) Nicoleta Dascălu	(Romania) Andreea Roșca (Mexico) Renata Zarazúa	6–1, 4–6, [10–7]
Win	2–2	Feb 2019	ITF Monastir, Tunisia	W15	Hard	(Romania) Cristina Ene	(Spain) Andrea Lázaro García (Greece) Despina Papamichail	6–3, 7–6^{(5)}
Loss	2–3	Feb 2020	ITF Mâcon, France	W25	Hard (i)	(France) Estelle Cascino	(France) Audrey Albié (France) Marine Partaud	6–3, 6–7^{(3)}, [10–12]
Loss	2–4	Sep 2020	ITF Marbella, Spain	W25	Clay	(France) Victoria Muntean	(Russia) Alina Charaeva (Russia) Oksana Selekhmeteva	3–6, 2–6
Loss	2–5	Mar 2021	ITF Pune, India	W25	Hard	(India) Riya Bhatia	(India) Rutuja Bhosale (United Kingdom) Emily Webley-Smith	2–6, 5–7
Win	3–5	Jun 2022	ITF Klosters, Switzerland	W25	Clay	(Czech Republic) Brenda Fruhvirtová	(Germany) Tayisiya Morderger (Germany) Yana Morderger	6–0, 6–1
