= Ilinca Amariei =

Romanian tennis player

- Full name: Ilinca Dalina Amariei
- Country (sports): Romania
- Residence: Iași, Romania
- Born: 30 July 2002 (age 24) Iași
- Plays: Right (two-handed backhand)
- Prize money: $116,927

Singles
- Career record: 234–139
- Career titles: 9 ITF
- Highest ranking: No. 317 (18 March 2024)
- Current ranking: No. 557 (16 November 2026)

Doubles
- Career record: 124–83
- Career titles: 9 ITF
- Highest ranking: No. 346 (14 July 2025)
- Current ranking: No. 803 (16 November 2026)
- Last updated on: 20 November 2026.

Ilinca Dalina Amariei (born 30 July 2002) is a Romanian tennis player.

Amariei has a career-high singles ranking by the WTA of 317, achieved on 18 March 2024. She also has a career-high WTA doubles ranking of 346, achieved on 14 July 2025. Amariei has won nine singles titles and nine doubles titles on the ITF World Tour.

== Career ==
Amariei made her WTA Tour main-draw debut at the 2021 Transylvania Open, where she received a wildcard into the doubles tournament, partnering with Briana Szabó.

== ITF Circuit finals ==
=== Singles: 12 (9 titles, 3 runner-ups) ===
| Legend W15 tournaments | Finals by surface Clay (9–3) |

| Result | W–L | Date | Tournament | Tier | Surface | Opponent | Score |
|---|---|---|---|---|---|---|---|
| Win | 1–0 | Sep 2022 | ITF Brașov, Romania | W15 | Clay | (Switzerland) Alina Granwehr | 6–1, 6–2 |
| Win | 2–0 | Oct 2022 | ITF Heraklion, Greece | W15 | Clay | (Germany) Anne Schäfer | 7–6^{(1)}, 6–2 |
| Win | 3–0 | Mar 2023 | ITF Heraklion, Greece | W15 | Clay | (France) Sara Cakarevic | 6–4, 6–1 |
| Win | 4–0 | Mar 2023 | ITF Heraklion, Greece | W15 | Clay | (Germany) Fabienne Gettwart | 6–4, 3–6, 6–2 |
| Win | 5–0 | Apr 2023 | ITF Antalya, Turkey | W15 | Clay | Valeriia Olianovskaia | 6–4, 6–2 |
| Loss | 5–1 | Nov 2024 | ITF Heraklion, Greece | W15 | Clay | (Lithuania) Klaudija Bubelytė | 2–6, 2–6 |
| Win | 6–1 | Nov 2024 | ITF Heraklion, Greece | W15 | Clay | (Greece) Dimitra Pavlou | 3–6, 6–4, 6–4 |
| Win | 7–1 | Jun 2025 | ITF Bucharest, Romania | W15 | Clay | (Romania) Lavinia Tănăsie | 3–6, 6–4, 6–4 |
| Loss | 7–2 | Jul 2025 | ITF Câmpina, Romania | W15 | Clay | (Romania) Elena Ruxandra Bertea | 3–6, 3–6 |
| Win | 8–2 | Jul 2025 | ITF Cluj-Napoca, Romania | W15 | Clay | (Romania) Patricia Maria Țig | 7–5, 2–6, 6–4 |
| Win | 9–2 | Jul 2026 | ITF Cluj-Napoca, Romania | W15 | Clay | (Romania) Teodora Miron | 6–2, 6–2 |
| Loss | 9–3 | Aug 2026 | ITF Brașov, Romania | W15 | Clay | (United States) Ashley Lahey | 6–4, 2–6, 5–7 |

=== Doubles: 17 (9 titles, 8 runner-ups) ===
| Legend W25/35 tournaments W15 tournaments | Finals by surface Clay (9–8) |

| Result | W–L | Date | Tournament | Tier | Surface | Partner | Opponents | Score |
|---|---|---|---|---|---|---|---|---|
| Win | 1–0 | Dec 2019 | ITF Heraklion, Greece | W15 | Clay | (Romania) Alessia Beatrice Ciucă | (Russia) Darya Astakhova (Israel) Lina Glushko | 6–3, 6–3 |
| Loss | 1–1 | Nov 2021 | ITF Heraklion, Greece | W15 | Clay | (Romania) Simona Ogescu | (Greece) Eleni Christofi (Greece) Martha Matoula | 6–3, 6–2 |
| Win | 2–1 | Apr 2022 | ITF Cairo, Egypt | W15 | Clay | (Germany) Carolina Kuhl | (Italy) Diletta Cherubini (Germany) Emily Welker | 6–2, 2–6, [10–3] |
| Loss | 2–2 | Sep 2022 | ITF Brașov, Romania | W15 | Clay | (Romania) Ioana Gașpar | (Slovenia) Nastja Kolar (Serbia) Bojana Marinković | 4–6, 4–6 |
| Win | 3–2 | Sep 2022 | ITF Casablanca, Morocco | W15 | Clay | (Czech Republic) Linda Ševčíková | (Italy) Matilde Mariani (Italy) Linda Salvi | 4–6, 6–2, [10–5] |
| Win | 4–2 | Oct 2022 | ITF Heraklion, Greece | W15 | Clay | (United Kingdom) Lauryn John-Baptiste | (Italy) Giorgia Pinto (Italy) Gaia Squarcialupi | 6–1, 6–1 |
| Win | 5–2 | Nov 2022 | ITF Heraklion, Greece | W15 | Clay | (Greece) Elena Korokozidi | (Germany) Silvia Ambrosio (Greece) Eleni Christofi | 7–5, 7–6^{(5)} |
| Loss | 5–3 | Jun 2023 | ITF Bucharest, Romania | W15 | Clay | (Czech Republic) Linda Ševčíková | (Romania) Ștefania Bojică (Romania) Mara Gae | 3–6, 4–6 |
| Win | 6–3 | Oct 2023 | ITF Heraklion, Greece | W25 | Clay | (Romania) Anca Todoni | (Austria) Melanie Klaffner (Austria) Sinja Kraus | 6–0, 5–7, [10–1] |
| Loss | 6–4 | Jul 2024 | ITF Brașov, Romania | W15 | Clay | (Czech Republic) Linda Ševčíková | (Romania) Ștefania Bojică (Romania) Mara Gae | 4–6, 0–6 |
| Loss | 6–5 | Aug 2024 | ITF Bucharest, Romania | W15 | Clay | (Czech Republic) Linda Ševčíková | (Romania) Ștefania Bojică (Romania) Mara Gae | 7–6^{(5)}, 3–6, [0–10] |
| Loss | 6–6 | Aug 2024 | ITF Bistrița, Romania | W35 | Clay | (Germany) Emily Welke | (Romania) Briana Szabó (Romania) Patricia Maria Țig | 3–6, 4–6 |
| Win | 7–6 | Oct 2024 | ITF Heraklion, Greece | W35 | Clay | (Greece) Elena Korokozidi | Polina Leykina; Elina Nepliy | 6–3, 6–3 |
| Win | 8–6 | Oct 2024 | ITF Heraklion, Greece | W15 | Clay | (Greece) Elena Korokozidi | (Greece) Eleni Chatziavraam (Greece) Sapfo Sakellaridi | 3–6, 6–3, [11–9] |
| Loss | 8–7 | Mar 2025 | ITF Antalya, Turkiye | W15 | Clay | (Germany) Chantal Sauvant | (Czech Republic) Denisa Hindová (Poland) Daria Kuczer | 1–6, 5–7 |
| Loss | 8–8 | Mar 2025 | ITF Antalya, Turkiye | W35 | Clay | (Romania) Cristina Dinu | (United States) Makenna Jones (Bulgaria) Lia Karatancheva | 2–6, 2–6 |
| Win | 9–8 | May 2025 | ITF Bol, Croatia | W35 | Clay | (Brazil) Ana Candiotto | (Croatia) Mariana Dražić; Anastasia Gasanova | 7–6^{(7)}, 6–2 |
