= Georgia Crăciun =

Romanian tennis player (born 1999)

- Full name: Georgia Andreea Crăciun
- Country (sports): Romania
- Born: 14 July 1999 (age 26) Brăila, Romania
- Height: 1.80 m (5 ft 11 in)
- Plays: Right (two-handed backhand)
- Prize money: $120,820

Singles
- Career record: 216–107
- Career titles: 11 ITF
- Highest ranking: No. 331 (23 June 2025)
- Current ranking: No. 367 (24 February 2025)

Grand Slam singles results
- Australian Open Junior: 1R (2016)
- French Open Junior: 1R (2016)
- US Open Junior: Q1 (2015)

Doubles
- Career record: 82–38
- Career titles: 12 ITF
- Highest ranking: No. 461 (10 February 2020)
- Current ranking: No. 1573 (5 August 2024)

Grand Slam doubles results
- Australian Open Junior: 2R (2016)
- French Open Junior: 2R (2016)
- Last updated on: 12 August 2024.

Georgia Andreea Crăciun (born 14 July 1999) is a Romanian professional tennis player.

Crăciun has won 11 singles and 12 doubles titles on the ITF Circuit. On 24 February 2020, she achieved a career-high singles ranking of world No. 347. On 10 February 2020, she peaked at No. 461 in the doubles rankings.

Crăciun made her WTA Tour debut at the 2017 BRD Bucharest Open, receiving a wildcard entry in the doubles main draw, partnering fellow Romanian Alexandra Dulgheru. The pair lost in the first round to the second-seeds Elise Mertens and Demi Schuurs.

== ITF Circuit finals ==
=== Singles: 21 (13 titles, 8 runner–ups) ===
Legend
$25,000 tournaments
$10/15,000 tournaments

Result	W–L	Date	Tournament	Tier	Surface	Opponent	Score
Loss	0–1	May 2015	ITF Galați, Romania	10,000	Clay	(Hungary) Fanny Stollár	6–2, 4–6, 5–7
Win	1–1	Mar 2017	ITF Antalya, Turkey	15,000	Clay	(Austria) Pia König	6–3, 6–2
Loss	1–2	May 2017	ITF Antalya, Turkey	15,000	Clay	(Germany) Lisa Matviyenko	3–6, 6–1, 5–7
Win	2–2	Jun 2017	ITF Curtea de Argeș, Romania	15,000	Clay	(India) Riya Bhatia	6–1, 6–1
Loss	2–3	Jul 2017	ITF Bucharest, Romania	15,000	Clay	(Romania) Cristina Dinu	3–6, 3–6
Win	3–3	Oct 2017	ITF Antalya, Turkey	15,000	Clay	(Ukraine) Sofiya Kovalets	6–3, 6–4
Win	4–3	Jul 2018	ITF Bucharest, Romania	15,000	Clay	(Italy) Anna Turati	7–5, 6–2
Win	5–3	Sep 2018	ITF Varna, Bulgaria	15,000	Clay	(Norway) Ulrikke Eikeri	6–2, 7–5
Win	6–3	Oct 2018	ITF Sozopol, Bulgaria	15,000	Hard	(Turkey) İlay Yörük	6–2, 6–1
Win	7–3	Oct 2018	ITF Antalya, Turkey	15,000	Hard	(Czech Republic) Magdalena Pantucková	7–5, 5–7, 7–6^{(9)}
Win	8–3	Jul 2019	ITF Stuttgart, Germany	25,000	Clay	(Belarus) Olga Govortsova	6–2, 6–3
Win	9–3	Jul 2019	ITF Bucharest, Romania	15,000	Clay	(Germany) Laura Schaeder	7–5, 6–2
Loss	9–4	Dec 2019	ITF Antalya, Turkey	15,000	Hard	(Switzerland) Leonie Küng	2–6, 4–6
Loss	9–5	Dec 2019	ITF Antalya, Turkey	15,000	Hard	(Russia) Polina Kudermetova	4–6, 6–3, 3–6
Win	10–5	Jan 2020	ITF Antalya, Turkey	15,000	Clay	(Croatia) Tara Würth	2–6, 6–3, 6–3
Loss	10–6	Jun 2024	ITF Galați, Romania	15,000	Clay	(Spain) Cristina Díaz Adrover	6–2, 4–6, 1–6
Win	11–6	Jun 2024	ITF Bucharest, Romania	15,000	Clay	(Romania) Patricia Maria Țig	6–1, ret.
Loss	11–7	Aug 2024	ITF Brașov, Romania	15,000	Clay	(Romania) Patricia Maria Țig	2–6, 2–6
Win	12–7	Aug 2024	ITF Cluj-Napoca, Romania	25,000	Clay	(Spain) Carlota Martínez Círez	6–1, 6–2
Win	13–7	Sep 2024	ITF Varna, Bulgaria	15,000	Clay	(Ukraine) Yelyzaveta Kotliar	7–5, 6–0
Loss	13–8	May 2025	ITF Bol, Croatia	W35	Clay	(Spain) Ariana Geerlings	2–6, 2–6

=== Doubles: 14 (12 titles, 2 runner–ups) ===
Legend
$25,000 tournaments
$10/15,000 tournaments

Result	W–L	Date	Tournament	Tier	Surface	Partner	Opponents	Score
Loss	0–1	Aug 2014	ITF Mamaia, Romania	25,000	Clay	(Romania) Patricia Maria Țig	(Romania) Irina Bara (Romania) Andreea Mitu	4–6, 1–6
Loss	0–2	Aug 2016	ITF Galați, Romania	10,000	Clay	(Romania) Karola Bejenaru	(Romania) Oana Georgeta Simion (Romania) Gabriela Talabă	7–5, 4–6, [3–10]
Win	1–2	Mar 2017	ITF Antalya, Turkey	15,000	Clay	(Romania) Ilona Georgiana Ghioroaie	(Russia) Anastasia Frolova (Russia) Alena Tarasova	6–1, 6–4
Win	2–2	May 2017	ITF Antalya, Turkey	15,000	Clay	(Romania) Ilona Georgiana Ghioroaie	(Croatia) Mariana Dražić (Denmark) Emilie Francati	6–2, 6–4
Win	3–2	Jun 2017	ITF Antalya, Turkey	15,000	Clay	(Romania) Ilona Georgiana Ghioroaie	(Croatia) Ena Kajević (Bolivia) Noelia Zeballos	w/o
Win	4–2	Jun 2017	ITF Curtea de Argeș, Romania	15,000	Clay	(Romania) Ilona Georgiana Ghioroaie	(Romania) Camelia Hristea (Romania) Gabriela Nicole Tătăruș	6–3, 7–5
Win	5–2	Sep 2017	ITF Antalya, Turkey	15,000	Clay	(Romania) Andreea Ghițescu	(Russia) Amina Anshba (Turkey) Melis Sezer	6–2, 6–2
Win	6–2	Oct 2018	ITF Antalya, Turkey	15,000	Hard	(Russia) Alena Fomina	(Turkey) Cemre Anil (Turkey) Melis Sezer	7–5, 7–6^{(4)}
Win	7–2	Nov 2018	ITF Antalya, Turkey	15,000	Hard	(Romania) Oana Georgeta Simion	(Romania) Ioana Gașpar (Romania) Andreea Prisacariu	6–1, 6–3
Win	8–2	Nov 2019	ITF Hua Hin, Thailand	25,000	Hard	(Spain) Eva Guerrero Álvarez	(Netherlands) Lesley Pattinama Kerkhove (Thailand) Tamarine Tanasugarn	6–2, 7–5
Win	9–2	Dec 2019	ITF Antalya, Turkey	15,000	Hard	(Romania) Ioana Gașpar	(Switzerland) Leonie Kung (Turkey) Melis Sezer	6–4, 1–6, [14–12]
Win	10–2	Dec 2019	ITF Antalya, Turkey	15,000	Hard	(Turkey) Başak Eraydın	(Turkey) Ayla Aksu (Turkey) Gizem Melisa Ateş	6–1, 6–2
Win	11–2	Jan 2020	ITF Antalya, Turkey	15,000	Hard	(Romania) Andreea Prisăcariu	(Italy) Martina Colmegna (Croatia) Silvia Njirić	7–5, 7–5
Win	12–2	Sep 2021	ITF Varna, Bulgaria	15,000	Clay	(Romania) Oana Gavrilă	(Italy) Chiara Catini (Russia) Victoria Mikhaylova	4–6, 7–6^{(6)}, [10–2]
