= 2022 Open Ciudad de Valencia =

Tennis tournament

- Date: 21–27 November 2022
- Edition: 6th
- Category: ITF Women's World Tennis Tour
- Prize money: $80,000+H
- Surface: Clay
- Location: Valencia, Spain

Champions

Singles
- (Spain) Marina Bassols Ribera

Doubles
- (Spain) Cristina Bucșa / (Switzerland) Ylena In-Albon
← 2021 ·	Open Ciudad de Valencia	· 2023 →

The 2022 Open Ciudad de Valencia was a professional tennis tournament played on outdoor clay courts. It was the sixth edition of the tournament which was part of the 2022 ITF Women's World Tennis Tour. It took place in Valencia, Spain between 21 and 27 November 2022.

== Champions ==
=== Singles ===
- (Spain) Marina Bassols Ribera def. (Switzerland) Ylena In-Albon, 6–4, 6–0

=== Doubles ===
- (Spain) Cristina Bucșa / (Switzerland) Ylena In-Albon def. Irina Khromacheva / Iryna Shymanovich, 6–3, 6–2

== Singles main draw entrants ==
=== Seeds ===
Country	Player	Rank^{1}	Seed
GER	Tamara Korpatsch	89	1
ESP	Cristina Bucșa	107	2
FRA	Océane Dodin	109	3
FRA	Kristina Mladenovic	112	4
POL	Magdalena Fręch	116	5
NED	Arantxa Rus	117	6
USA	Alycia Parks	119	7
ESP	Rebeka Masarova	134	8

- ^{1} Rankings are as of 14 November 2022.

=== Other entrants ===
The following players received wildcards into the singles main draw:

- (Spain) Irene Burillo Escorihuela
- (Spain) ~~Ángela Fita Boluda~~
- (Spain) Andrea Lázaro García
- (Serbia) Mia Ristić

The following players received entry from the qualifying draw:

- (Italy) Nuria Brancaccio
- (Malta) Francesca Curmi
- (Slovenia) Veronika Erjavec
- (Spain) Claudia Hoste Ferrer
- (Italy) Angelica Moratelli
- (Burundi) Sada Nahimana
- (France) Lucie Nguyen Tan
- Iryna Shymanovich

The following players received entry as lucky losers:

- (Turkey) Çağla Büyükakçay
- (Romania) Ilona Georgiana Ghioroaie
- (Romania) Andreea Prisăcariu
- (United States) Chiara Scholl
