= 2021 Open Ciudad de Valencia – Doubles =

Tennis tournament in Spain

Doubles
- 2021 Open Ciudad de Valencia

Final
- Champions: (Spain) Aliona Bolsova (Venezuela) Andrea Gámiz
- Runners-up: (Georgia (country)) Ekaterine Gorgodze (Brazil) Laura Pigossi
- Score: 6–3, 6–4

Events
Singles	Doubles
← 2019 ·	Open Ciudad de Valencia	· 2022 →

Irina Bara and Rebeka Masarova were the defending champions but lost in the semifinals to Aliona Bolsova and Andrea Gámiz.

Bolsova and Gámiz went on to win the title, defeating Ekaterine Gorgodze and Laura Pigossi in the final, 6–3, 6–4.

== Seeds ==
1. (Georgia (country)) Ekaterine Gorgodze / (Brazil) Laura Pigossi (final)
2. (Spain) Aliona Bolsova / (Venezuela) Andrea Gámiz (champions)
3. (Romania) Irina Bara / (Spain) Rebeka Masarova (semifinals)
4. (United Kingdom) Naiktha Bains / (Switzerland) Simona Waltert (quarterfinals)

== Draw ==
=== Key ===
- Q = Qualifier
- WC = Wild card
- LL = Lucky loser
- Alt = Alternate
- SE = Special exempt
- PR = Protected ranking
- ITF = ITF entry
- JE = Junior exempt
- w/o = Walkover
- r = Retired
- d = Defaulted
- SR = Special ranking

=== Draw ===
First round
1	(Georgia (country)) E Gorgodze (Brazil) L Pigossi	6	7
(France) C Paquet (France) D Parry	4	5
(Japan) M Kawamura (Japan) F Kozaki	1	6	[9]
(United Kingdom) SB Grey (Greece) D Papamichail	6	4	[11]
4	(United Kingdom) N Bains (Switzerland) S Waltert	6	6
(Romania) M Buzărnescu (Spain) Á Fita Boluda	4	1
(Italy) N Brancaccio (Italy) L Pigato	4	6	[7]
(Spain) Y Cavallé Reimers (Chile) D Seguel	6	4	[10]
(Argentina) P Ormaechea (Italy) A Zantedeschi	6	2	[10]
(Romania) IG Ghioroaie (Belarus) I Shymanovich	4	6	[5]
(Spain) M Bassols Ribera (Spain) L Romero Gormaz	7	1	[7]
3	(Romania) I Bara (Spain) R Masarova	5	6	[10]
(Romania) N Dascălu (India) P Thombare	6	2	[3]
(Australia) S Mendez (Italy) C Rosatello	2	6	[10]
WC	(Spain) A Carrillo Marín (Spain) R González Vilar	4	2
2	(Spain) A Bolsova (Venezuela) A Gámiz	6	6

Quarterfinals
1	(Georgia (country)) E Gorgodze (Brazil) L Pigossi	6	6
(United Kingdom) SB Grey (Greece) D Papamichail	4	3
4	(United Kingdom) N Bains (Switzerland) S Waltert	3	6	[9]
(Spain) Y Cavallé Reimers (Chile) D Seguel	6	4	[11]
(Argentina) P Ormaechea (Italy) A Zantedeschi	1	2
3	(Romania) I Bara (Spain) R Masarova	6	6
(Australia) S Mendez (Italy) C Rosatello	2	1
2	(Spain) A Bolsova (Venezuela) A Gámiz	6	6

Semifinals
1	(Georgia (country)) E Gorgodze (Brazil) L Pigossi	6	6
(Spain) Y Cavallé Reimers (Chile) D Seguel	4	3
3	(Romania) I Bara (Spain) R Masarova	4	6^{5}
2	(Spain) A Bolsova (Venezuela) A Gámiz	6	7^{7}

Final
1	(Georgia (country)) E Gorgodze (Brazil) L Pigossi	3	4
2	(Spain) A Bolsova (Venezuela) A Gámiz	6	6
