= 2018 BBVA Open Ciudad de Valencia =

- Date: 24–30 September
- Edition: 3rd
- Category: ITF Women's Circuit
- Prize money: $60,000+H
- Surface: Clay
- Location: Valencia, Spain

Champions

Singles
- (Spain) Paula Badosa Gibert

Doubles
- (Russia) Irina Khromacheva / (Serbia) Nina Stojanović
← 2017 ·	Open Ciudad de Valencia	· 2019 →

The 2018 BBVA Open Ciudad de Valencia was a professional tennis tournament played on outdoor clay courts. It was the third edition of the tournament and was part of the 2018 ITF Women's Circuit. It took place in Valencia, Spain, on 24–30 September 2018.

== Singles main draw entrants ==
=== Seeds ===
Country	Player	Rank^{1}	Seed
GER	Carina Witthöft	91	1
BEL	Ysaline Bonaventure	119	2
ESP	Georgina García Pérez	134	3
RUS	Irina Khromacheva	155	4
PAR	Verónica Cepede Royg	156	5
ROU	Irina Bara	158	6
LIE	Kathinka von Deichmann	161	7
GRE	Valentini Grammatikopoulou	172	8

- ^{1} Rankings as of 17 September 2018.

=== Other entrants ===
The following players received a wildcard into the singles main draw:

- (Spain) Marina Bassols Ribera
- (Spain) Guiomar Maristany
- (Spain) Olga Sáez Larra
- (Australia) Isabelle Wallace

The following players received entry into the singles main draw using a protected ranking:

- (Germany) Anne Schäfer
- (Slovakia) Rebecca Šramková

The following players received entry from the qualifying draw:

- (Belgium) Marie Benoît
- (Venezuela) Andrea Gámiz
- (Spain) Eva Guerrero Álvarez
- (Argentina) Paula Ormaechea

The following player received entry as a lucky loser:

- (Brazil) Gabriela Cé

== Champions ==
=== Singles ===
- (Spain) Paula Badosa Gibert def. (Spain) Aliona Bolsova Zadoinov, 6–1, 4–6, 6–2

=== Doubles ===
- (Russia) Irina Khromacheva / (Serbia) Nina Stojanović def. (Greece) Valentini Grammatikopoulou / (Mexico) Renata Zarazúa, 6–1, 6–4
