= 2019 BBVA Open Ciudad de Valencia =

- Date: 23–29 September 2019
- Edition: 4th
- Category: ITF Women's World Tennis Tour
- Prize money: $60,000+H
- Surface: Clay
- Location: Valencia, Spain

Champions

Singles
- (Russia) Varvara Gracheva

Doubles
- (Romania) Irina Bara / (Spain) Rebeka Masarova
← 2018 ·	Open Ciudad de Valencia	· 2021 →

The 2019 BBVA Open Ciudad de Valencia was a professional tennis tournament played on outdoor clay courts. It was the fourth edition of the tournament which was part of the 2019 ITF Women's World Tennis Tour. It took place in Valencia, Spain between 23 and 29 September 2019.

== Singles main-draw entrants ==
=== Seeds ===
Country	Player	Rank^{1}	Seed
ESP	Aliona Bolsova	91	1
NED	Arantxa Rus	102	2
GER	Tamara Korpatsch	142	3
PAR	Verónica Cepede Royg	147	4
LUX	Mandy Minella	154	5
AUT	Barbara Haas	157	6
USA	Allie Kiick	163	7
SVK	Rebecca Šramková	175	8

- ^{1} Rankings are as of 16 September 2019.

=== Other entrants ===
The following players received wildcards into the singles main draw:

- (Italy) Sara Errani
- (Spain) Eva Guerrero Álvarez
- (Spain) Claudia Hoste Ferrer
- (Malta) Helene Pellicano

The following player received entry as a special exempt:

- (Spain) Irene Burillo Escorihuela

The following players received entry from the qualifying draw:

- (Belgium) Marie Benoît
- (Romania) Nicoleta Dascălu
- (Venezuela) Andrea Gámiz
- (Russia) Daria Mishina
- (Spain) Guiomar Maristany
- (Egypt) Mayar Sherif
- (Spain) Rosa Vicens Mas
- (Belgium) Maryna Zanevska

== Champions ==
=== Singles ===
- (Russia) Varvara Gracheva def. (Germany) Tamara Korpatsch, 3–6, 6–2, 6–0

=== Doubles ===
- (Romania) Irina Bara / (Spain) Rebeka Masarova def. (Venezuela) Andrea Gámiz / (Australia) Seone Mendez, 6–4, 7–6^{(7–2)}
