= 2021 Open Ciudad de Valencia – Singles =

Tennis tournament in Spain

Singles
- 2021 Open Ciudad de Valencia

Final
- Champion: (Netherlands) Arantxa Rus
- Runner-up: (Romania) Mihaela Buzărnescu
- Score: 6–4, 7–6^{(7–3)}

Events
Singles	Doubles
← 2019 ·	Open Ciudad de Valencia	· 2022 →

Varvara Gracheva was the defending champion but chose to participate at the 2021 J&T Banka Ostrava Open instead.

Arantxa Rus won the title, defeating Mihaela Buzărnescu in the final, 6–4, 7–6^{(7–3)}.

== Seeds ==
1. (Netherlands) Arantxa Rus (champion)
2. (Italy) Martina Trevisan (withdrew)
3. (Italy) Sara Errani (withdrew)
4. (Romania) Irina Bara (quarterfinals)
5. (Slovakia) Kristína Kučová (first round)
6. (Hungary) Dalma Gálfi (first round, retired)
7. (Georgia (country)) Ekaterine Gorgodze (first round)
8. (United Kingdom) Francesca Jones (quarterfinals)
9. (Spain) Aliona Bolsova (semifinals)

== Draw ==
=== Key ===
- Q = Qualifier
- WC = Wild card
- LL = Lucky loser
- Alt = Alternate
- SE = Special exempt
- PR = Protected ranking
- ITF = ITF entry
- JE = Junior exempt
- w/o = Walkover
- r = Retired
- d = Defaulted
- SR = Special ranking

=== Finals ===
Semifinals
1	(Netherlands) Arantxa Rus	7^{7}	6
(Australia) Seone Mendez	6^{3}	2
(Romania) Mihaela Buzărnescu	6	6
9	(Spain) Aliona Bolsova	4	2

Final
1	(Netherlands) Arantxa Rus	6	7^{7}
(Romania) Mihaela Buzărnescu	4	6^{3}

=== Top half ===
First round
1	(Netherlands) A Rus	6	6
Q	(Romania) IG Ghioroaie	3	1
(Paraguay) V Cepede Royg	3	7^{7}	2
Q	(Belarus) I Shymanovich	6	6^{4}	6
WC	(Spain) Á Fita Boluda	6	6
WC	(Spain) R Masarova	1	3
(Chile) D Seguel	6	6^{4}	6
7	(Georgia (country)) E Gorgodze	4	7^{7}	2
4	(Romania) I Bara	6	6
LL	(United Kingdom) A Carreras	4	3
(France) C Paquet	6	7^{7}
(Spain) I Burillo Escorihuela	1	6^{5}
(Australia) S Mendez	6	6
(Switzerland) S Waltert	3	0
Q	(Spain) L Romero Gormaz	3
6	(Hungary) D Gálfi	1^{r}

Second round
1	(Netherlands) A Rus	6	6
Q	(Belarus) I Shymanovich	3	4
WC	(Spain) Á Fita Boluda	4	7^{7}	1
(Chile) D Seguel	6	6^{1}	6
4	(Romania) I Bara	4	6	6
(France) C Paquet	6	4	4
(Australia) S Mendez	6	6
Q	(Spain) L Romero Gormaz	0	2

Quarterfinals
1	(Netherlands) A Rus	6	6
(Chile) D Seguel	4	1
4	(Romania) I Bara	3	7^{10}	4
(Australia) S Mendez	6	6^{8}	6

Semifinals
1	(Netherlands) A Rus	7^{7}	6
(Australia) S Mendez	6^{3}	2

=== Bottom half ===
First round
5	(Slovakia) K Kučová	7^{7}	3	3
Q	(Romania) A Prisăcariu	6^{4}	6	6
(Argentina) P Ormaechea	3	6^{3}
(Romania) M Buzărnescu	6	7^{7}
WC	(Venezuela) A Gámiz	4	7^{11}	7^{7}
Q	(Spain) M Bassols Ribera	6	6^{9}	6^{4}
WC	(Spain) J Bouzas Maneiro	2	2
LL	(Spain) E Guerrero Álvarez	6	6
8	(United Kingdom) F Jones	6	6
Q	(United Kingdom) N Bains	3	1
JE	(France) D Parry	3	3
(Greece) D Papamichail	6	6
Q	(Spain) M Gutiérrez Carrasco	6	0	6
(Turkey) Ç Büyükakçay	2	6	4
Q	(Japan) F Kozaki	2	2
9	(Spain) A Bolsova	6	6

Second round
Q	(Romania) A Prisăcariu	0	1
(Romania) M Buzărnescu	6	6
WC	(Venezuela) A Gámiz	7	7
LL	(Spain) E Guerrero Álvarez	5	5
8	(United Kingdom) F Jones	7^{8}	6
(Greece) D Papamichail	6^{6}	1
Q	(Spain) M Gutiérrez Carrasco	7^{7}	4	0
9	(Spain) A Bolsova	6^{5}	6	6

Quarterfinals
(Romania) M Buzărnescu	6	6
WC	(Venezuela) A Gámiz	2	3
8	(United Kingdom) F Jones	6^{4}	1
9	(Spain) A Bolsova	7^{7}	6

Semifinals
(Romania) M Buzărnescu	6	6
9	(Spain) A Bolsova	4	2
