= 2023 Open Ciudad de Valencia – Doubles =

Doubles
- 2023 Open Ciudad de Valencia

Final
- Champions: (Greece) Valentini Grammatikopoulou (Romania) Andreea Mitu
- Runners-up: (Spain) Aliona Bolsova (Georgia (country)) Natela Dzalamidze
- Score: 7–5, 6–4

Events
Singles	Doubles
← 2022 ·	Open Ciudad de Valencia	· 2024 →

Cristina Bucșa and Ylena In-Albon are the defending champions but In-Albon chose to participate only in the singles competition, Bucșa chose not to participate.

Valentini Grammatikopoulou and Andreea Mitu won the title, defeating Aliona Bolsova and Natela Dzalamidze in the final, 7–5, 6–4.

== Seeds ==
1. (United Kingdom) Alicia Barnett / (Italy) Angelica Moratelli (quarterfinals)
2. (Spain) Aliona Bolsova / (Georgia (country)) Natela Dzalamidze (final)
3. (United States) Jessie Aney / (United Kingdom) Olivia Nicholls (quarterfinals)
4. (United Kingdom) Emily Appleton / (Netherlands) Isabelle Haverlag (first round)

== Draw ==
=== Key ===
- Q = Qualifier
- WC = Wild card
- LL = Lucky loser
- Alt = Alternate
- SE = Special exempt
- PR = Protected ranking
- ITF = ITF entry
- JE = Junior exempt
- w/o = Walkover
- r = Retired
- d = Defaulted
- SR = Special ranking

=== Draw ===
First round
1	(United Kingdom) A Barnett (Italy) A Moratelli	6	6
(Germany) T Morderger (Germany) Y Morderger	3	4
(Greece) V Grammatikopoulou (Romania) A Mitu	6	6
WC	(Spain) P Arias Manjón (Spain) I Burillo Escorihuela	2	1
4	(United Kingdom) E Appleton (Netherlands) I Haverlag	3	6	[6]
WC	(Spain) Y Cavallé Reimers (Spain) Á Fita Boluda	6	4	[10]
(Slovenia) N Radišić (Latvia) D Semeņistaja	7^{7}	6
(Turkey) Ç Büyükakçay; A Charaeva	6^{2}	3
WC	(Mexico) M Portillo Ramírez (Spain) L Romero Gormaz	6^{6}	3
(Ukraine) M Kolb (Ukraine) N Kolb	7^{8}	6
(Italy) N Brancaccio (Egypt) M Sherif	4	6^{2}
3	(United States) J Aney (United Kingdom) O Nicholls	6	7^{7}
(Croatia) T Lukas (France) K Mladenovic	6^{5}	6	[12]
E Makarova; E Reyngold	7^{7}	3	[10]
(Romania) O Gavrilă (Latvia) D Vismane	7	0	[4]
2	(Spain) A Bolsova (Georgia (country)) N Dzalamidze	5	6	[10]

Quarterfinals
1	(United Kingdom) A Barnett (Italy) A Moratelli	6	6^{0}	[5]
(Greece) V Grammatikopoulou (Romania) A Mitu	3	7^{7}	[10]
WC	(Spain) Y Cavallé Reimers (Spain) Á Fita Boluda	4	3
(Slovenia) N Radišić (Latvia) D Semeņistaja	6	6
(Ukraine) M Kolb (Ukraine) N Kolb	3	6	[10]
3	(United States) J Aney (United Kingdom) O Nicholls	6	1	[8]
(Croatia) T Lukas (France) K Mladenovic	2	6	[8]
2	(Spain) A Bolsova (Georgia (country)) N Dzalamidze	6	3	[10]

Semifinals
(Greece) V Grammatikopoulou (Romania) A Mitu	7^{7}	6
(Slovenia) N Radišić (Latvia) D Semeņistaja	6^{2}	4
(Ukraine) M Kolb (Ukraine) N Kolb	2	1
2	(Spain) A Bolsova (Georgia (country)) N Dzalamidze	6	6

Final
(Greece) V Grammatikopoulou (Romania) A Mitu	7	6
2	(Spain) A Bolsova (Georgia (country)) N Dzalamidze	5	4
