= ITF Women's Valencia =

ITF Women's Valencia may refer to:

- Open Ciudad de Valencia (2016–present)
- Open Internacional de Valencia (2021)
