= 2019 BBVA Open Ciudad de Valencia – Doubles =

Doubles
- 2019 BBVA Open Ciudad de Valencia

Final
- Champions: (Romania) Irina Bara (Spain) Rebeka Masarova
- Runners-up: (Venezuela) Andrea Gámiz (Australia) Seone Mendez
- Score: 6–4, 7–6^{(7–2)}

Events
Singles	Doubles
← 2018 ·	Open Ciudad de Valencia	· 2021 →

Irina Khromacheva and Nina Stojanović were the defending champions, but chose not to participate.

Irina Bara and Rebeka Masarova won the title, defeating Andrea Gámiz and Seone Mendez in the final, 6–4, 7–6^{(7–2)}.

== Seeds ==
1. (Romania) Cristina Dinu / (Russia) Alena Fomina (first round)
2. (Romania) Elena Bogdan / (Brazil) Paula Cristina Gonçalves (first round)
3. (Romania) Nicoleta Dascălu / (France) Elixane Lechemia (semifinals)
4. (Georgia (country)) Ekaterine Gorgodze / (Netherlands) Arantxa Rus (semifinals)

== Draw ==
=== Key ===
- Q = Qualifier
- WC = Wild card
- LL = Lucky loser
- Alt = Alternate
- SE = Special exempt
- PR = Protected ranking
- ITF = ITF entry
- JE = Junior exempt
- w/o = Walkover
- r = Retired
- d = Defaulted
- SR = Special ranking

=== Draw ===
First round
1	(Romania) C Dinu (Russia) A Fomina	5	4
(Venezuela) A Gámiz (Australia) S Mendez	7	6
(Greece) D Papamichail (Egypt) M Sherif	6	6
WC	(Spain) N Bouzó Zanotti (Spain) Á Moreno Barranquero	4	2
3	(Romania) N Dascălu (France) E Lechemia	3	6	[10]
WC	(Spain) P Arias Manjón (Malta) H Pellicano	6	3	[1]
(Spain) M Bassols Ribera (Spain) Á Fita Boluda	7^{8}	4	[5]
(United States) C Liu (Mexico) AS Sánchez	6^{6}	6	[10]
(Spain) A Bolsova (Croatia) T Mrdeža	7	6
(Switzerland) C Perrin (Argentina) N Podoroska	5	1
WC	(Spain) L Cortez Llorca (Spain) C Hoste Ferrer	5	2
4	(Georgia (country)) E Gorgodze (Netherlands) A Rus	7	6
(Romania) I Bara (Spain) R Masarova	6	6
(Spain) I Burillo Escorihuela (Spain) A Lázaro García	2	2
(Spain) E Guerrero Álvarez (Spain) G Maristany	7	6
2	(Romania) E Bogdan (Brazil) PC Gonçalves	5	4

Quarterfinals
(Venezuela) A Gámiz (Australia) S Mendez	w/o
(Greece) D Papamichail (Egypt) M Sherif
3	(Romania) N Dascălu (France) E Lechemia	6	5	[10]
(United States) C Liu (Mexico) AS Sánchez	2	7	[7]
(Spain) A Bolsova (Croatia) T Mrdeža	4	6	[4]
4	(Georgia (country)) E Gorgodze (Netherlands) A Rus	6	1	[10]
(Romania) I Bara (Spain) R Masarova	w/o
(Spain) E Guerrero Álvarez (Spain) G Maristany

Semifinals
(Venezuela) A Gámiz (Australia) S Mendez	7	2	[10]
3	(Romania) N Dascălu (France) E Lechemia	5	6	[2]
4	(Georgia (country)) E Gorgodze (Netherlands) A Rus	6	5	[7]
(Romania) I Bara (Spain) R Masarova	4	7	[10]

Final
(Venezuela) A Gámiz (Australia) S Mendez	4	6^{2}
(Romania) I Bara (Spain) R Masarova	6	7^{7}
