= 2023 Open Ciudad de Valencia – Singles =

Singles
- 2023 Open Ciudad de Valencia

Final
- Champion: (Bulgaria) Viktoriya Tomova
- Runner-up: (Romania) Jaqueline Cristian
- Score: 7–5, 6–3

Events
Singles	Doubles
← 2022 ·	Open Ciudad de Valencia	· 2024 →

Marina Bassols Ribera was the reigning champion but chose not to participate.

Viktoriya Tomova won the title, defeating Jaqueline Cristian in the final, 7–5, 6–3.

== Seeds ==
1. (Egypt) Mayar Sherif (second round)
2. (Bulgaria) Viktoriya Tomova (champion)
3. (Romania) Jaqueline Cristian (final)
4. (France) Océane Dodin (second round)
5. (Spain) Nuria Párrizas Díaz (second round)
6. (Slovakia) Rebecca Šramková (quarterfinals, retired)
7. (Latvia) Darja Semeņistaja (first round)
8. (Spain) Aliona Bolsova (quarterfinals)

== Draw ==
=== Key ===
- Q = Qualifier
- WC = Wild card
- LL = Lucky loser
- Alt = Alternate
- SE = Special exempt
- PR = Protected ranking
- ITF = ITF entry
- JE = Junior exempt
- w/o = Walkover
- r = Retired
- d = Defaulted
- SR = Special ranking

=== Finals ===
Semifinals
(Poland) Katarzyna Kawa	0	2
3	(Romania) Jaqueline Cristian	6	6
(Romania) Andreea Mitu	2	1
2	(Bulgaria) Viktoriya Tomova	6	6

Final
3	(Romania) Jaqueline Cristian	5	3
2	(Bulgaria) Viktoriya Tomova	7	6

=== Top half ===
First round
1	(Egypt) M Sherif	7	6
(Switzerland) Y In-Albon	5	3
Q	(Serbia) M Ristić	7^{7}	7^{7}
(North Macedonia) L Gjorcheska	6^{5}	6^{4}
(Italy) N Brancaccio	4	0
WC	(Spain) A Geerlings	6	6
(Poland) K Kawa	0	6	6
7	(Latvia) D Semeņistaja	6	3	1
3	(Romania) J Cristian	6	6
Q	(Mexico) M Portillo Ramírez	1	1
(Turkey) Ç Büyükakçay	4	4
SR	(Romania) I Fetecău	6	6
Q	(Switzerland) S Scilipoti	6	6
WC	(Spain) Á Fita Boluda	4	3
Q	A Charaeva	1	2
6	(Slovakia) R Šramková	6	6

Second round
1	(Egypt) M Sherif	7	6^{6}	4
Q	(Serbia) M Ristić	5	7^{8}	6
WC	(Spain) A Geerlings	2	2
(Poland) K Kawa	6	6
3	(Romania) J Cristian	6	6
SR	(Romania) I Fetecău	2	2
Q	(Switzerland) S Scilipoti	2	6	6^{3}
6	(Slovakia) R Šramková	6	3	7^{7}

Quarterfinals
Q	(Serbia) M Ristić	6^{2}	6^{7}
(Poland) K Kawa	7^{7}	7^{9}
3	(Romania) J Cristian	6	3
6	(Slovakia) R Šramková	1	0^{r}

Semifinals
(Poland) K Kawa	0	2
3	(Romania) J Cristian	6	6

=== Bottom half ===
First round
5	(Spain) N Párrizas Díaz	6	6
WC	(Spain) A Mintegi del Olmo	2	1
E Makarova	3	6	3
(Spain) I Burillo Escorihuela	6	3	6
Q	(Spain) R Roura Llaverias	0	3
(Romania) A Mitu	6	6
Q	(Latvia) D Vismane	7	2	2
4	(France) O Dodin	5	6	6
8	(Spain) A Bolsova	6	6
(France) K Mladenovic	2	1
Q	(Germany) C Sauvant	7^{7}	4	4
Q	(Slovenia) N Radišić	6^{3}	6	6
(Greece) V Grammatikopoulou	4	6	3
WC	(Spain) L Romero Gormaz	6	1	6
(Croatia) T Lukas	3	3
2	(Bulgaria) V Tomova	6	6

Second round
5	(Spain) N Párrizas Díaz	4	3
(Spain) I Burillo Escorihuela	6	6
(Romania) A Mitu	7^{14}	6
4	(France) O Dodin	6^{12}	2
8	(Spain) A Bolsova	6	3
Q	(Slovenia) N Radišić	0	0^{r}
WC	(Spain) L Romero Gormaz	3	2
2	(Bulgaria) V Tomova	6	6

Quarterfinals
(Spain) I Burillo Escorihuela	3	7^{9}	2
(Romania) A Mitu	6	6^{7}	6
8	(Spain) A Bolsova	0	4
2	(Bulgaria) V Tomova	6	6

Semifinals
(Romania) A Mitu	2	1
2	(Bulgaria) V Tomova	6	6
