= 2021 Open Ciudad de Valencia =

Tennis tournament

- Date: 20–26 September 2021
- Edition: 5th
- Category: ITF Women's World Tennis Tour
- Prize money: $80,000
- Surface: Clay
- Location: Valencia, Spain

Champions

Singles
- (Netherlands) Arantxa Rus

Doubles
- (Spain) Aliona Bolsova / (Venezuela) Andrea Gámiz
| ← 2019 · | Open Ciudad de Valencia | · 2022 → |

The 2021 Open Ciudad de Valencia was a professional women's tennis tournament played on outdoor clay courts. It was the fifth edition of the tournament which was part of the 2021 ITF Women's World Tennis Tour. It took place in Valencia, Spain between 20 and 26 September 2021.

== Singles main-draw entrants ==
=== Seeds ===
| Country | Player | Rank^{1} | Seed |
|---|---|---|---|
| NED | Arantxa Rus | 75 | 1 |
| ~~ITA~~ | ~~Martina Trevisan~~ | ~~79~~ | ~~2~~ |
| ~~ITA~~ | ~~Sara Errani~~ | ~~110~~ | ~~3~~ |
| ROU | Irina Bara | 118 | 4 |
| SVK | Kristína Kučová | 119 | 5 |
| HUN | Dalma Gálfi | 138 | 6 |
| GEO | Ekaterine Gorgodze | 158 | 7 |
| GBR | Francesca Jones | 160 | 8 |
| ESP | Aliona Bolsova | 166 | 9 |

- ^{1} Rankings are as of 13 September 2021.

=== Other entrants ===
The following players received wildcards into the singles main draw:

- (Spain) Jéssica Bouzas Maneiro
- (Spain) Ángela Fita Boluda
- (Venezuela) Andrea Gámiz
- (Spain) Rebeka Masarova

The following player received entry using a junior exempt:

- (France) Diane Parry

The following players received entry from the qualifying draw:

- (United Kingdom) Naiktha Bains
- (Spain) Marina Bassols Ribera
- (Romania) Ilona Georgiana Ghioroaie
- (Spain) María Gutiérrez Carrasco
- (Japan) Funa Kozaki
- (Romania) Andreea Prisăcariu
- (Spain) Leyre Romero Gormaz
- (Belarus) Iryna Shymanovich

The following players received entry as lucky losers:

- (United Kingdom) Amanda Carreras
- (Spain) Eva Guerrero Álvarez

== Champions ==
=== Singles ===
- (Netherlands) Arantxa Rus def. (Romania) Mihaela Buzărnescu, 6–4, 7–6^{(7–3)}

=== Doubles ===
- (Spain) Aliona Bolsova / (Venezuela) Andrea Gámiz def. (Georgia (country)) Ekaterine Gorgodze / (Brazil) Laura Pigossi, 6–3, 6–4
