= 2022 Open Ciudad de Valencia – Singles =

Singles
- 2022 Open Ciudad de Valencia

Final
- Champion: (Spain) Marina Bassols Ribera
- Runner-up: (Switzerland) Ylena In-Albon
- Score: 6–4, 6–0

Events
Singles	Doubles
← 2021 ·	Open Ciudad de Valencia	· 2023 →

Arantxa Rus was the defending champion but lost in the second round to Leyre Romero Gormaz.

Marina Bassols Ribera won the title, defeating Ylena In-Albon in the final, 6–4, 6–0.

== Seeds ==
1. (Germany) Tamara Korpatsch (semifinals)
2. (Spain) Cristina Bucșa (first round)
3. (France) Océane Dodin (quarterfinals, retired)
4. (France) Kristina Mladenovic (first round, retired)
5. (Poland) Magdalena Fręch (second round, retired)
6. (Netherlands) Arantxa Rus (second round)
7. (United States) Alycia Parks (semifinals)
8. (Spain) Rebeka Masarova (second round)

== Draw ==
=== Key ===
- Q = Qualifier
- WC = Wild card
- LL = Lucky loser
- Alt = Alternate
- SE = Special exempt
- PR = Protected ranking
- ITF = ITF entry
- JE = Junior exempt
- w/o = Walkover
- r = Retired
- d = Defaulted
- SR = Special ranking

=== Finals ===
Semifinals
1	(Germany) Tamara Korpatsch	3	1
(Spain) Marina Bassols Ribera	6	6
7	(United States) Alycia Parks	5	6^{4}
(Switzerland) Ylena In-Albon	7	7^{7}

Final
(Spain) Marina Bassols Ribera	6	6
(Switzerland) Ylena In-Albon	4	0

=== Top half ===
First round
1	(Germany) T Korpatsch	6	7
LL	(Turkey) Ç Büyükakçay	4	5
WC	(Serbia) M Ristić	6	0	0
WC	(Spain) I Burillo Escorihuela	1	6	6
LL	(Romania) A Prisăcariu	1	2
(Spain) J Bouzas Maneiro	6	6
I Khromacheva	1	4
5	(Poland) M Fręch	6	6
4	(France) K Mladenovic	1	0^{r}
(France) C Monnet	6	2
(Spain) M Bassols Ribera	4	6	6
Q	I Shymanovich	6	0	2
Q	(Italy) A Moratelli	2	1
(Spain) L Romero Gormaz	6	6
Q	(France) L Nguyen Tan	0	0
6	(Netherlands) A Rus	6	6

Second round
1	(Germany) T Korpatsch	6	6
WC	(Spain) I Burillo Escorihuela	1	3
(Spain) J Bouzas Maneiro	6	3
5	(Poland) M Fręch	0	0^{r}
(France) C Monnet	2	1
(Spain) M Bassols Ribera	6	6
(Spain) L Romero Gormaz	6	6
6	(Netherlands) A Rus	2	4

Quarterfinals
1	(Germany) T Korpatsch	6	6
(Spain) J Bouzas Maneiro	4	1
(Spain) M Bassols Ribera	6	7
(Spain) L Romero Gormaz	0	5

Semifinals
1	(Germany) T Korpatsch	3	1
(Spain) M Bassols Ribera	6	6

=== Bottom half ===
First round
7	(United States) A Parks	6	6
LL	(United States) C Scholl	1	1
(Italy) C Rosatello	2	2
Q	(Malta) F Curmi	6	6
(Spain) A Bolsova	7^{7}	6
Q	(Italy) N Brancaccio	6^{3}	4
LL	(Romania) IG Ghioroaie	3	3
3	(France) O Dodin	6	6
8	(Spain) R Masarova	6	6
WC	(Spain) A Lázaro García	0	3
Q	(Spain) C Hoste Ferrer	3	3
Q	(Slovenia) V Erjavec	6	6
(Greece) D Papamichail	4	3
Q	(Burundi) S Nahimana	6	6
(Switzerland) Y In-Albon	6	6
2	(Spain) C Bucșa	2	2

Second round
7	(United States) A Parks	6^{3}	6	6
Q	(Malta) F Curmi	7^{7}	0	4
(Spain) A Bolsova	3	4
3	(France) O Dodin	6	6
8	(Spain) R Masarova	6	6^{3}	4
Q	(Slovenia) V Erjavec	2	7^{7}	6
Q	(Burundi) S Nahimana	4	0^{r}
(Switzerland) Y In-Albon	6	2

Quarterfinals
7	(United States) A Parks	6	3
3	(France) O Dodin	0	0^{r}
Q	(Slovenia) V Erjavec	3	5
(Switzerland) Y In-Albon	6	7

Semifinals
7	(United States) A Parks	5	6^{4}
(Switzerland) Y In-Albon	7	7^{7}
