= 2022 Open Ciudad de Valencia – Doubles =

Doubles
- 2022 Open Ciudad de Valencia

Final
- Champions: (Spain) Cristina Bucșa (Switzerland) Ylena In-Albon
- Runners-up: Irina Khromacheva; Iryna Shymanovich
- Score: 6–3, 6–2

Events
Singles	Doubles
← 2021 ·	Open Ciudad de Valencia	· 2023 →

Aliona Bolsova and Andrea Gámiz were the defending champions but Gámiz chose to compete at the 2022 Montevideo Open instead. Bolsova partnered alongside Rebeka Masarova but lost in the quarterfinals to Irina Khromacheva and Iryna Shymanovich.

Cristina Bucșa and Ylena In-Albon won the title, defeating Khromacheva and Shymanovich in the final, 6–3, 6–2.

== Seeds ==
1. (United States) Alycia Parks / (Netherlands) Arantxa Rus (first round)
2. (Spain) Aliona Bolsova / (Spain) Rebeka Masarova (quarterfinals)
3. (United Kingdom) Emily Appleton / (Netherlands) Isabelle Haverlag (quarterfinals)
4. (Slovenia) Veronika Erjavec / (United Kingdom) Emily Webley-Smith (quarterfinals)

== Draw ==
=== Key ===
- Q = Qualifier
- WC = Wild card
- LL = Lucky loser
- Alt = Alternate
- SE = Special exempt
- PR = Protected ranking
- ITF = ITF entry
- JE = Junior exempt
- w/o = Walkover
- r = Retired
- d = Defaulted
- SR = Special ranking

=== Draw ===
First round
1	(United States) A Parks (Netherlands) A Rus	6	6^{3}	[8]
(Italy) N Brancaccio (Latvia) D Vismane	3	7^{7}	[10]
(Spain) C Bucșa (Switzerland) Y In-Albon	6	4	[10]
(Germany) T Korpatsch (United States) C Scholl	2	6	[6]
3	(United Kingdom) E Appleton (Netherlands) I Haverlag	6	6
WC	(Portugal) I Murta (India) V Shinde	2	4
WC	(Spain) M Bassols Ribera (Spain) O Parres Azcoitia	4	4
(Italy) A Moratelli (Italy) C Rosatello	6	6
(Spain) J Bouzas Maneiro (Spain) L Romero Gormaz	6	6
Alt	(Romania) IG Ghioroaie (Romania) A Prisăcariu	4	4
WC	(Spain) C Hoste Ferrer (Spain) L Llinares Domingo	1	0
4	(Slovenia) V Erjavec (United Kingdom) E Webley-Smith	6	6
I Khromacheva; I Shymanovich	5	6	[10]
(Spain) I Burillo Escorihuela (Spain) A Lázaro García	7	3	[8]
A Fomina-Klotz (Slovenia) N Radišić	3	6	[4]
2	(Spain) A Bolsova (Spain) R Masarova	6	4	[10]

Quarterfinals
(Italy) N Brancaccio (Latvia) D Vismane	6	6^{5}	[7]
(Spain) C Bucșa (Switzerland) Y In-Albon	2	7^{7}	[10]
3	(United Kingdom) E Appleton (Netherlands) I Haverlag	6	5	[8]
(Italy) A Moratelli (Italy) C Rosatello	2	7	[10]
(Spain) J Bouzas Maneiro (Spain) L Romero Gormaz	6	6
4	(Slovenia) V Erjavec (United Kingdom) E Webley-Smith	3	2
I Khromacheva; I Shymanovich	5	6	[13]
2	(Spain) A Bolsova (Spain) R Masarova	7	4	[11]

Semifinals
(Spain) C Bucșa (Switzerland) Y In-Albon	6	4	[10]
(Italy) A Moratelli (Italy) C Rosatello	2	6	[7]
(Spain) J Bouzas Maneiro (Spain) L Romero Gormaz	5	3
I Khromacheva; I Shymanovich	7	6

Final
(Spain) C Bucșa (Switzerland) Y In-Albon	6	6
I Khromacheva; I Shymanovich	3	2
