= 2018 BBVA Open Ciudad de Valencia – Singles =

Singles
- 2018 BBVA Open Ciudad de Valencia

Final
- Champion: (Spain) Paula Badosa Gibert
- Runner-up: (Spain) Aliona Bolsova Zadoinov
- Score: 6–1, 4–6, 6–2

Events
Singles	Doubles
← 2017 ·	Open Ciudad de Valencia	· 2019 →

Irina Bara was the defending champion, but lost in the second round to Paula Badosa Gibert.

Badosa Gibert went on to win the title, defeating Aliona Bolsova Zadoinov in the final, 6–1, 4–6, 6–2.

== Seeds ==
1. (Germany) Carina Witthöft (first round)
2. (Belgium) Ysaline Bonaventure (first round)
3. (Spain) Georgina García Pérez (second round)
4. (Russia) Irina Khromacheva (first round)
5. (Paraguay) Verónica Cepede Royg (first round)
6. (Romania) Irina Bara (second round)
7. (Liechtenstein) Kathinka von Deichmann (first round)
8. (Greece) Valentini Grammatikopoulou (first round)

== Draw ==
=== Key ===
- Q = Qualifier
- WC = Wild card
- LL = Lucky loser
- Alt = Alternate
- SE = Special exempt
- PR = Protected ranking
- ITF = ITF entry
- JE = Junior exempt
- w/o = Walkover
- r = Retired
- d = Defaulted
- SR = Special ranking

=== Finals ===
Semifinals
PR	(Slovakia) Rebecca Šramková	6	2	6^{5}
(Spain) Aliona Bolsova Zadoinov	3	6	7^{7}
(Turkey) Başak Eraydın	6	6^{2}	0^{r}
(Spain) Paula Badosa Gibert	2	7^{7}	2

Final
(Spain) Aliona Bolsova Zadoinov	1	6	2
(Spain) Paula Badosa Gibert	6	4	6

=== Top half ===
First round
1	(Germany) C Witthöft	3	4
(Italy) J Paolini	6	6
WC	(Australia) I Wallace	6	4	6
WC	(Spain) O Sáez Larra	3	6	4
(Romania) A Roșca	2	6	5
WC	(Spain) M Bassols Ribera	6	4	7
PR	(Slovakia) R Šramková	6	6
5	(Paraguay) V Cepede Royg	2	2
3	(Spain) G García Pérez	6	6
PR	(Germany) A Schäfer	3	1
Q	(Argentina) P Ormaechea	7	6
Q	(Belgium) M Benoît	5	2
(Spain) A Bolsova Zadoinov	6	6
Q	(Spain) E Guerrero Álvarez	0	2
Q	(Venezuela) A Gámiz	3	6	6
8	(Greece) V Grammatikopoulou	6	4	2

Second round
(Italy) J Paolini	6	6
WC	(Australia) I Wallace	3	0
WC	(Spain) M Bassols Ribera	7	3	2
PR	(Slovakia) R Šramková	5	6	6
3	(Spain) G García Pérez	2	5
Q	(Argentina) P Ormaechea	6	7
(Spain) A Bolsova Zadoinov	6	5	6
Q	(Venezuela) A Gámiz	1	7	4

Quarterfinals
(Italy) J Paolini	4	4
PR	(Slovakia) R Šramková	6	6
Q	(Argentina) P Ormaechea	4	4
(Spain) A Bolsova Zadoinov	6	6

Semifinals
PR	(Slovakia) R Šramková	6	2	6^{5}
(Spain) A Bolsova Zadoinov	3	6	7^{7}

=== Bottom half ===
First round
7	(Liechtenstein) K von Deichmann	5	3
(Belgium) M Zanevska	7	6
(Ukraine) K Zavatska	6	1	2
(Italy) M Trevisan	1	6	6
LL	(Brazil) G Cé	3	2
(Turkey) B Eraydın	6	6
(Mexico) R Zarazúa	7^{7}	6
4	(Russia) I Khromacheva	6^{5}	2
6	(Romania) I Bara	6	5	7
(Italy) M Di Giuseppe	3	7	5
(Spain) P Badosa Gibert	7	0	6
(Croatia) T Mrdeža	5	6	4
(Turkey) Ç Büyükakçay	6	5	3
(Serbia) N Stojanović	0	7	6
WC	(Spain) G Maristany	6	4	6
2	(Belgium) Y Bonaventure	4	6	4

Second round
(Belgium) M Zanevska	6	4	6
(Italy) M Trevisan	0	6	4
(Turkey) B Eraydın	7^{7}	6
(Mexico) R Zarazúa	6^{1}	4
6	(Romania) I Bara	3	6	5
(Spain) P Badosa Gibert	6	2	7
(Serbia) N Stojanović	3	7^{7}	6
WC	(Spain) G Maristany	6	6^{0}	4

Quarterfinals
(Belgium) M Zanevska	1	3^{r}
(Turkey) B Eraydın	6	2
(Spain) P Badosa Gibert	6	6^{11}	7^{9}
(Serbia) N Stojanović	4	7^{13}	6^{7}

Semifinals
(Turkey) B Eraydın	6	6^{2}	0^{r}
(Spain) P Badosa Gibert	2	7^{7}	2
