= 2019 BBVA Open Ciudad de Valencia – Singles =

Singles
- 2019 BBVA Open Ciudad de Valencia

Final
- Champion: (Russia) Varvara Gracheva
- Runner-up: (Germany) Tamara Korpatsch
- Score: 3–6, 6–2, 6–0

Events
Singles	Doubles
← 2018 ·	Open Ciudad de Valencia	· 2021 →

Paula Badosa was the defending champion, but chose not to participate.

Varvara Gracheva won the title, defeating Tamara Korpatsch in the final, 3–6, 6–2, 6–0.

== Seeds ==
1. (Spain) Aliona Bolsova (second round)
2. (Netherlands) Arantxa Rus (quarterfinals)
3. (Germany) Tamara Korpatsch (final)
4. (Paraguay) Verónica Cepede Royg (second round)
5. (Luxembourg) Mandy Minella (first round)
6. (Austria) Barbara Haas (first round)
7. (United States) Allie Kiick (second round)
8. (Slovakia) Rebecca Šramková (quarterfinals)

== Draw ==
=== Key ===
- Q = Qualifier
- WC = Wild card
- LL = Lucky loser
- Alt = Alternate
- SE = Special exempt
- PR = Protected ranking
- ITF = ITF entry
- JE = Junior exempt
- w/o = Walkover
- r = Retired
- d = Defaulted
- SR = Special ranking

=== Finals ===
Semifinals
(Romania) Irina Bara	1	1
(Russia) Varvara Gracheva	6	6
3	(Germany) Tamara Korpatsch	7	6
(Ukraine) Marta Kostyuk	5	2

Final
(Russia) Varvara Gracheva	3	6	6
3	(Germany) Tamara Korpatsch	6	2	0

=== Top half ===
First round
1	(Spain) A Bolsova	1	6	6
(Croatia) T Mrdeža	6	4	3
(Romania) I Bara	6	6
SE	(Spain) I Burillo Escorihuela	2	0
(Georgia (country)) E Gorgodze	6	6
(Russia) V Ivakhnenko	3	2
(Italy) M Trevisan	7	6
6	(Austria) B Haas	5	0
4	(Paraguay) V Cepede Royg	6	6
WC	(Malta) H Pellicano	0	2
Q	(Belgium) M Zanevska	1	2
(Turkey) Ç Büyükakçay	6	6
Q	(Romania) N Dascălu	2	5
(Russia) V Gracheva	6	7
Q	(Spain) R Vicens Mas	7^{7}	4	2
7	(United States) A Kiick	6^{4}	6	6

Second round
1	(Spain) A Bolsova	5	0
(Romania) I Bara	7	6
(Georgia (country)) E Gorgodze	6	4	6
(Italy) M Trevisan	2	6	3
4	(Paraguay) V Cepede Royg	6	5	5
(Turkey) Ç Büyükakçay	1	7	7
(Russia) V Gracheva	6	6
7	(United States) A Kiick	1	1

Quarterfinals
(Romania) I Bara	6	6
(Georgia (country)) E Gorgodze	4	0
(Turkey) Ç Büyükakçay	2	1
(Russia) V Gracheva	6	6

Semifinals
(Romania) I Bara	1	1
(Russia) V Gracheva	6	6

=== Bottom half ===
First round
8	(Slovakia) R Šramková	7^{7}	6
Q	(Venezuela) A Gámiz	6^{1}	4
Q	(Spain) G Maristany	7^{7}	6
Q	(Egypt) M Sherif	6^{5}	4
WC	(Spain) C Hoste Ferrer	1	2
(Switzerland) C Perrin	6	6
(Italy) M Di Giuseppe	3	6	4
3	(Germany) T Korpatsch	6	1	6
5	(Luxembourg) M Minella	3	1
(Ukraine) M Kostyuk	6	6
(Netherlands) R Hogenkamp	4	6	3
WC	(Italy) S Errani	6	2	6
Q	(Russia) D Mishina	6^{5}	6	6
Q	(Belgium) M Benoît	7^{7}	3	1
WC	(Spain) E Guerrero Álvarez	4	6^{5}
2	(Netherlands) A Rus	6	7^{7}

Second round
8	(Slovakia) R Šramková	4	6	6
Q	(Spain) G Maristany	6	4	3
(Switzerland) C Perrin	3	5
3	(Germany) T Korpatsch	6	7
(Ukraine) M Kostyuk	6	6
WC	(Italy) S Errani	2	4
Q	(Russia) D Mishina	4	3
2	(Netherlands) A Rus	6	6

Quarterfinals
8	(Slovakia) R Šramková	4	3
3	(Germany) T Korpatsch	6	6
(Ukraine) M Kostyuk	6	3	6
2	(Netherlands) A Rus	4	6	0

Semifinals
3	(Germany) T Korpatsch	7	6
(Ukraine) M Kostyuk	5	2
