= 2023 Open Ciudad de Valencia =

Tennis tournament

- Date: 20–26 November 2023
- Edition: 7th
- Category: ITF Women's World Tennis Tour
- Prize money: $100,000
- Surface: Clay
- Location: Valencia, Spain

Champions

Singles
- (Bulgaria) Viktoriya Tomova

Doubles
- (Greece) Valentini Grammatikopoulou / (Romania) Andreea Mitu
← 2022 ·	Open Ciudad de Valencia	· 2024 →

The 2023 Open Ciudad de Valencia is a professional tennis tournament played on outdoor clay courts. It is the seventh edition of the tournament which was part of the 2023 ITF Women's World Tennis Tour. It took place in Valencia, Spain between 20 and 26 November 2023.

== Champions ==
=== Singles ===
- (Bulgaria) Viktoriya Tomova def. (Romania) Jaqueline Cristian, 7–5, 6–3

=== Doubles ===
- (Greece) Valentini Grammatikopoulou / (Romania) Andreea Mitu def. (Spain) Aliona Bolsova / (Georgia (country)) Natela Dzalamidze, 7–5, 6–4

== Singles main draw entrants ==
=== Seeds ===
Country	Player	Rank^{1}	Seed
EGY	Mayar Sherif	59	1
BUL	Viktoriya Tomova	95	2
ROU	Jaqueline Cristian	98	3
FRA	Océane Dodin	101	4
ESP	Nuria Párrizas Díaz	127	5
SVK	Rebecca Šramková	132	6
LAT	Darja Semeņistaja	137	7
ESP	Aliona Bolsova	139	8

- ^{1} Rankings are as of 13 November 2023.

=== Other entrants ===
The following players received wildcards into the singles main draw:

- (Spain) Ángela Fita Boluda
- (Spain) Ariana Geerlings
- (Spain) Ane Mintegi del Olmo
- (Spain) Leyre Romero Gormaz

The following player received entry into the singles main draw using a special ranking:

- (Romania) Irina Fetecău

The following players received entry from the qualifying draw:

- Alina Charaeva
- (Mexico) María Portillo Ramírez
- (Slovenia) Nika Radišić
- (Serbia) Mia Ristić
- (Spain) Ruth Roura Llaverias
- (Germany) Chantal Sauvant
- (Switzerland) Sebastianna Scilipoti
- (Latvia) Daniela Vismane
