= 2018 BBVA Open Ciudad de Valencia – Doubles =

Doubles
- 2018 BBVA Open Ciudad de Valencia

Final
- Champions: (Russia) Irina Khromacheva (Serbia) Nina Stojanović
- Runners-up: (Greece) Valentini Grammatikopoulou (Mexico) Renata Zarazúa
- Score: 6–1, 6–4

Events
Singles	Doubles
← 2017 ·	Open Ciudad de Valencia	· 2019 →

Cristina Bucșa and Yana Sizikova were the defending champions, but both players chose not to participate.

Irina Khromacheva and Nina Stojanović won the title, defeating Valentini Grammatikopoulou and Renata Zarazúa in the final, 6–1, 6–4.

== Seeds ==
1. (Russia) Irina Khromacheva / (Serbia) Nina Stojanović (champions)
2. (Brazil) Laura Pigossi / (Belgium) Maryna Zanevska (semifinals, withdrew)
3. (Greece) Valentini Grammatikopoulou / (Mexico) Renata Zarazúa (final)
4. (Spain) Yvonne Cavallé Reimers / (Venezuela) Andrea Gámiz (first round)

== Draw ==
=== Key ===
- Q = Qualifier
- WC = Wild card
- LL = Lucky loser
- Alt = Alternate
- SE = Special exempt
- PR = Protected ranking
- ITF = ITF entry
- JE = Junior exempt
- w/o = Walkover
- r = Retired
- d = Defaulted
- SR = Special ranking

=== Draw ===
First round
1	(Russia) I Khromacheva (Serbia) N Stojanović	6	6
(Poland) E Duda (Spain) A Redondo Gutiérrez	0	1
(Spain) E Guerrero Álvarez (Spain) G Maristany	6	4	[4]
(Romania) E Bogdan (Italy) G Marchetti	2	6	[10]
4	(Spain) Y Cavallé Reimers (Venezuela) A Gámiz	3	6	[7]
(Spain) M Bassols Ribera (Spain) C Hoste Ferrer	6	4	[10]
(Malta) H Pellicano (Australia) I Wallace	1	3
(Brazil) G Cé (Argentina) P Ormaechea	6	6
(Spain) M Gutiérrez Carrasco (Russia) Ana Pribylova	6	6
WC	(Russia) S Afifi (Spain) L Barona	1	0
(Belgium) M Benoît (Romania) A Roșca	5	1
3	(Greece) V Grammatikopoulou (Mexico) R Zarazúa	7	6
(Spain) E Cabeza Candela (Spain) Á Fita Boluda	7^{7}	2	[10]
(Spain) A Herrero Liñana (France) D Parry	6^{5}	6	[7]
(Spain) A Bolsova Zadoinov (Spain) S Soler Espinosa	3	6^{5}
2	(Brazil) L Pigossi (Belgium) M Zanevska	6	7^{7}

Quarterfinals
1	(Russia) I Khromacheva (Serbia) N Stojanović	6	7^{7}
(Romania) E Bogdan (Italy) G Marchetti	2	6^{2}
(Spain) M Bassols Ribera (Spain) C Hoste Ferrer	3	6	[7]
(Brazil) G Cé (Argentina) P Ormaechea	6	3	[10]
(Spain) M Gutiérrez Carrasco (Russia) Ana Pribylova	6	3	[10]
3	(Greece) V Grammatikopoulou (Mexico) R Zarazúa	2	6	[12]
(Spain) E Cabeza Candela (Spain) Á Fita Boluda	2	2
2	(Brazil) L Pigossi (Belgium) M Zanevska	6	6

Semifinals
1	(Russia) I Khromacheva (Serbia) N Stojanović	7^{7}	7
(Brazil) G Cé (Argentina) P Ormaechea	6^{4}	5
3	(Greece) V Grammatikopoulou (Mexico) R Zarazúa	w/o
2	(Brazil) L Pigossi (Belgium) M Zanevska

Final
1	(Russia) I Khromacheva (Serbia) N Stojanović	6	6
3	(Greece) V Grammatikopoulou (Mexico) R Zarazúa	1	4
