= Ylena In-Albon =

Swiss tennis player (born 1999)

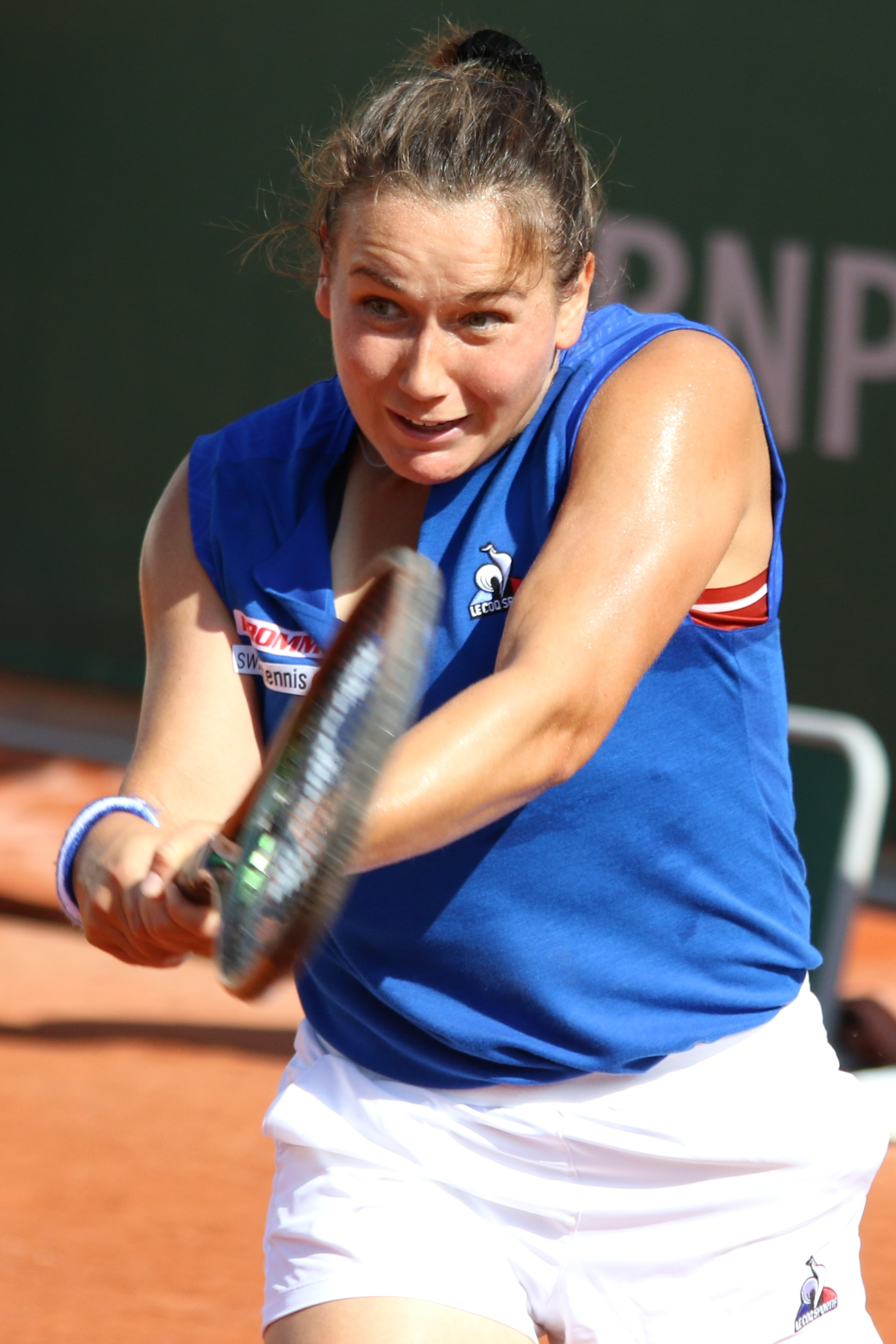
- In-Albon at the 2022 French Open
- Country (sports): Switzerland
- Born: 6 March 1999 (age 27) Visp, Switzerland
- Height: 1.60 m (5 ft 3 in)
- Turned pro: 2014
- Retired: 2026
- Plays: Right-handed (two-handed backhand)
- Prize money: $572,134

Singles
- Career record: 363–246
- Career titles: 12 ITF
- Highest ranking: No. 110 (6 June 2022)
- Current ranking: No. 1,312 (26 October 2026)

Grand Slam singles results
- Australian Open: Q1 (2022, 2023)
- French Open: 1R (2023)
- Wimbledon: 1R (2022)
- US Open: Q1 (2019, 2022, 2023)

Doubles
- Career record: 142–102
- Career titles: 13 ITF
- Highest ranking: No. 225 (3 February 2020)
- Current ranking: No. 730 (26 October 2026)

Grand Slam doubles results
- French Open Junior: SF (2016)
- Wimbledon Junior: 2R (2016)
- US Open Junior: 1R (2016)

Ylena In-Albon (born 6 March 1999) is a Swiss former professional tennis player. She achieved career-high WTA rankings of 110 in singles and No. 225 in doubles.

== Career ==
In-Albon made her main-draw debut on the WTA Tour at the 2017 Ladies Open Biel Bienne in the doubles draw, partnering fellow Swiss player Leonie Küng.

She made her major main-draw debut as a direct entry at the 2022 Wimbledon Championships, replacing Sofia Kenin. In-Albon lost to 28th seed Alison Riske in the first round.

She qualified for the main draw at the 2023 French Open, but lost in the opening round to Claire Liu.

As a qualifier, In-Albon reached her first WTA 125 final at the 2024 MundoTenis Open, defeating top seed María Lourdes Carlé in the semifinals, before losing the championship match to seventh seed Maja Chwalińska, in straight sets.

In-Albon announced her retirement from professional tennis in September 2026.

== Performance timeline ==
Key
W	F	SF	QF	#R	RR	Q#	DNQ	A	NH

(W) winner; (F) finalist; (SF) semifinalist; (QF) quarterfinalist; (#R) rounds 4, 3, 2, 1; (RR) round-robin stage; (Q#) qualification round; (DNQ) did not qualify; (A) absent; (NH) not held; (SR) strike rate (events won / competed); (W–L) win–loss record.
To avoid confusion and double counting, these charts are updated at the conclusion of a tournament or when the player's participation has ended.

Only main-draw results in WTA Tour, Grand Slam tournaments, Fed Cup/Billie Jean King Cup, and Olympic Games are included in win–loss records.

=== Singles ===
Tournament	2019	...	2022	2023	SR	W–L
Grand Slam tournaments
Australian Open	A		Q1	Q1	0 / 0	0–0
French Open	Q1		Q1	1R	0 / 1	0–1
Wimbledon	Q1		1R	Q1	0 / 1	0–1
US Open	Q1		Q1	Q1	0 / 0	0–0
Win–Loss	0–0		0–1	0–1	0 / 2	0–2
WTA 1000
Indian Wells Open	A		A	Q1	0 / 0	0–0
Miami Open	A		A	Q1	0 / 0	0–0
Career statistics
Tournaments	2		5	3	Career total: 10	
Overall win-loss	0–2		0–5	0–3	0 / 10	0–10

== WTA 125 finals ==
=== Singles: 1 (runner-up) ===
Result	Date	Tournament	Surface	Opponent	Score
Loss	Dec 2024	Florianópolis Open, Brazil	Clay	(Poland) Maja Chwalińska	1–6, 2–6

== ITF Circuit finals ==
=== Singles: 22 (12 titles, 10 runner-ups) ===
Legend W80 tournaments W60 tournaments W25/35 tournaments W10/15 tournaments	Finals by surface Hard (2–2) Clay (10–8)

Result	W–L	Date	Tournament	Tier	Surface	Opponent	Score
Win	1–0	Sep 2016	ITF Santa Margherita di Pula, Italy	W10	Clay	(Italy) Alice Balducci	7–5, 6–2
Loss	1–1	Nov 2016	ITF Santa Margherita di Pula	W10	Clay	(Hungary) Vanda Lukács	1–6, 2–6
Loss	1–2	Nov 2017	ITF Heraklion, Greece	W15	Clay	(France) Irina Ramialison	1–6, 4–6
Win	2–2	Mar 2018	ITF Palma Nova, Spain	W15	Clay	(Bulgaria) Isabella Shinikova	6–1, 7–5
Win	3–2	Mar 2018	ITF Heraklion, Greece	W15	Clay	(Hungary) Anna Bondár	4–6, 7–6^{(3)}, 6–1
Win	4–2	May 2018	ITF Oeiras, Portugal	W15	Clay	(Belgium) Tamaryn Hendler	7–5, ret.
Win	5–2	Jul 2018	ITF Setúbal, Portugal	W25	Hard	(Bosnia and Herzegovina) Dea Herdželaš	7–5, 6–2
Win	6–2	Feb 2019	All Japan Indoor Championships	W60	Hard (i)	(China) Zhang Kailin	6–2, 6–3
Win	7–2	May 2021	ITF Antalya, Turkey	W15	Clay	(Germany) Luisa Meyer auf der Heide	6–3, 6–2
Win	8–2	Jun 2021	ITF Klosters, Switzerland	W25	Clay	(Romania) Andreea Prisăcariu	6–3, 6–2
Win	9–2	Jul 2021	ITF Les Contamines, France	W25	Hard	(United Kingdom) Jodie Burrage	4–6, 7–5, 7–5
Win	10–2	Aug 2021	Verbier Open, Switzerland	W25	Clay	(Russia) Erika Andreeva	6–1, 6–4
Loss	10–3	Oct 2021	ITF Les Franqueses del Vallès, Spain	W80+H	Hard	(Belgium) Maryna Zanevska	6–7^{(5)}, 4–6
Loss	10–4	Mar 2022	Open Medellín, Colombia	W25	Clay	(Netherlands) Suzan Lamens	4–6, 2–6
Win	11–4	May 2022	Open Saint-Gaudens, France	W60	Clay	(Brazil) Carolina Alves	4–6, 6–4, 6–3
Loss	11–5	May 2022	Grado Tennis Cup, Italy	W60	Clay	(Italy) Elisabetta Cocciaretto	2–6, 2–6
Win	12–5	Oct 2022	ITF Santa Margherita di Pula	W25	Clay	(Germany) Noma Noha Akugue	6–3, 6–2
Loss	12–6	Oct 2022	ITF Santa Margherita di Pula	W25	Clay	(Sweden) Caijsa Hennemann	1–6, 5–7
Loss	12–7	Oct 2022	ITF Santa Margherita di Pula	W25	Clay	(Czech Republic) Brenda Fruhvirtová	0–6, 1–6
Loss	12–8	Nov 2022	Open de Valencia, Spain	W80+H	Clay	(Spain) Marina Bassols Ribera	4–6, 0–6
Loss	12–9	Apr 2023	ITF Santa Margherita di Pula	W25	Clay	(Czech Republic) Nikola Bartůňková	0–6, 5–7
Loss	12–10	Jan 2024	ITF Buenos Aires, Argentina	W35	Clay	(Romania) Maria Sara Popa	2–6, 0–6

=== Doubles: 26 (13 titles, 13 runner-ups) ===
Legend W80 tournaments W60 tournaments W50 tournaments W25/35 tournaments W10/15 tournaments	Finals by surface Hard (3–5) Clay (10–5) Carpet (0–3)

Result	W–L	Date	Tournament	Tier	Surface	Partner	Opponents	Score
Loss	0–1	Oct 2016	ITF Santa Margherita di Pula, Italy	W10	Clay	(Italy) Giorgia Marchetti	(Italy) Federica Bilardo (Italy) Tatiana Pieri	4–6, 5–7
Win	1–1	Oct 2016	ITF Santa Margherita di Pula	W10	Clay	(Italy) Giorgia Marchetti	(Germany) Lisa Ponomar (Romania) Michele Alexandra Zmău	4–6, 6–2, [10–8]
Win	2–1	Nov 2016	ITF Santa Margherita di Pula	W10	Clay	(Italy) Giorgia Marchetti	(Italy) Anna Remondina (Italy) Dalila Spiteri	6–1, 6–3
Loss	2–2	Feb 2017	ITF Bergamo, Italy	W15	Clay (i)	(Italy) Martina Colmegna	(Italy) Tatiana Pieri (Italy) Lucrezia Stefanini	6–3, 3–6, [6–10]
Loss	2–3	Mar 2017	ITF Solarino, Italy	W15	Carpet	(Italy) Tatiana Pieri	(Romania) Laura-Ioana Andrei (Czech Republic) Petra Krejsová	0–6, 3–6
Loss	2–4	Mar 2017	ITF Solarino, Italy	W15	Carpet	(Italy) Georgia Brescia	(Romania) Laura-Ioana Andrei (Czech Republic) Petra Krejsová	3–6, 2–6
Win	3–4	Nov 2017	ITF Heraklion, Greece	W15	Clay	(Japan) Mana Ayukawa	(Germany) Franziska Kommer (Germany) Laura Schaeder	6–4, 6–3
Loss	3–5	Sep 2019	Montreux Ladies Open, Switzerland	W60	Clay	(Switzerland) Conny Perrin	(Luxembourg) Mandy Minella (Switzerland) Xenia Knoll	3–6, 4–6
Loss	3–6	Oct 2019	ITF Santa Margherita di Pula	W25	Clay	(Italy) Giorgia Marchetti	(Russia) Amina Anshba (Czech Republic) Anastasia Dețiuc	5–7, 1–6
Loss	3–7	Jan 2021	ITF Manacor, Spain	W15	Hard	(Switzerland) Valentina Ryser	(Spain) Ángela Fita Boluda (Russia) Oksana Selekhmeteva	1–6, 6–4, [5–10]
Win	4–7	Jan 2021	ITF Manacor, Spain	W15	Hard	(Italy) Camilla Rosatello	(Spain) Ángela Fita Boluda (Russia) Oksana Selekhmeteva	7–6^{(3)}, 6–7^{(9)}, [10–5]
Loss	4–8	Feb 2021	AK Ladies Open, Germany	W25	Carpet (i)	(Switzerland) Viktorija Golubic	(Poland) Paula Kania-Choduń (Germany) Julia Wachaczyk	6–7^{(5)}, 4–6
Loss	4–9	Mar 2021	ITF Manacor, Spain	W15	Hard	(Spain) Rebeka Masarova	(Spain) Ángela Fita Boluda (Russia) Oksana Selekhmeteva	2–6, 7–5, [8–10]
Win	5–9	May 2021	ITF Antalya, Turkey	W15	Clay	(Germany) Katharina Hobgarski	(Netherlands) Eva Vedder (Netherlands) Stéphanie Visscher	6–3, 6–3
Loss	5–10	Jul 2021	ITF Les Contamines, France	W25	Hard	(Argentina) María Lourdes Carlé	(Latvia) Diāna Marcinkēviča (United States) Chiara Scholl	6–3, 2–6, [7–10]
Win	6–10	Oct 2021	ITF Hamburg, Germany	W25	Hard (i)	(Latvia) Kamilla Bartone	(Australia) Olivia Gadecki (Burundi) Sada Nahimana	6–4, 6–3
Loss	6–11	Nov 2021	ITF Ortisei, Italy	W25	Hard (i)	(Switzerland) Susan Bandecchi	(Japan) Moyuka Uchijima (Hong Kong) Eudice Chong	2–6, 6–1, [5–10]
Win	7–11	Mar 2022	ITF Anapoima, Colombia	W25	Clay	(Hungary) Réka Luca Jani	(Argentina) María Lourdes Carlé (Brazil) Laura Pigossi	1–6, 6–3, [10–7]
Win	8–11	Nov 2022	Open de Valencia, Spain	W80+H	Clay	(Spain) Cristina Bucșa	(Russia) Irina Khromacheva (Belarus) Iryna Shymanovich	6–3, 6–2
Loss	8–12	Oct 2023	ITF Santa Margherita di Pula	W25	Clay	(Germany) Katharina Hobgarski	(Italy) Martina Colmegna (Argentina) Guillermina Naya	2–6, 7–6^{(6)}, [8–10]
Win	9–12	Sep 2024	ITF Reus, Spain	W35	Clay	(Mexico) María Portillo Ramírez	(Austria) Julia Grabher (Germany) Caroline Werner	6–4, 6–3
Win	10–12	Oct 2024	ITF Seville, Spain	W35	Clay	(Spain) Ángela Fita Boluda	(Spain) Aliona Bolsova (Greece) Martha Matoula	6–2, 6–1
Loss	10–13	Jan 2025	ITF La Marsa, Tunisia	W50	Hard	(Spain) Ángela Fita Boluda	(China) Guo Meiqi (China) Xiao Zhenghua	3–6, 4–6
Win	11–13	Mar 2025	ITF Sabadell, Spain	W35	Clay	(Spain) Aliona Bolsova	(Slovenia) Živa Falkner (Slovenia) Pia Lovrič	6–4, 6–0
Win	12–13	Aug 2025	ITF Bistrița, Romania	W50	Clay	(Spain) Ángela Fita Boluda	(Chinese Taipei) Li Yu-yun; Daria Lodikova	7–6^{(5)}, 7–5
Win	13–13	Feb 2026	Porto Indoor, Portugal	W50	Hard (i)	(Spain) Ángela Fita Boluda	(Germany) Noma Noha Akugue (Bosnia and Herzegovina) Anita Wagner	6–4, 7–6^{(5)}
