= Seone Mendez =

Australian tennis player

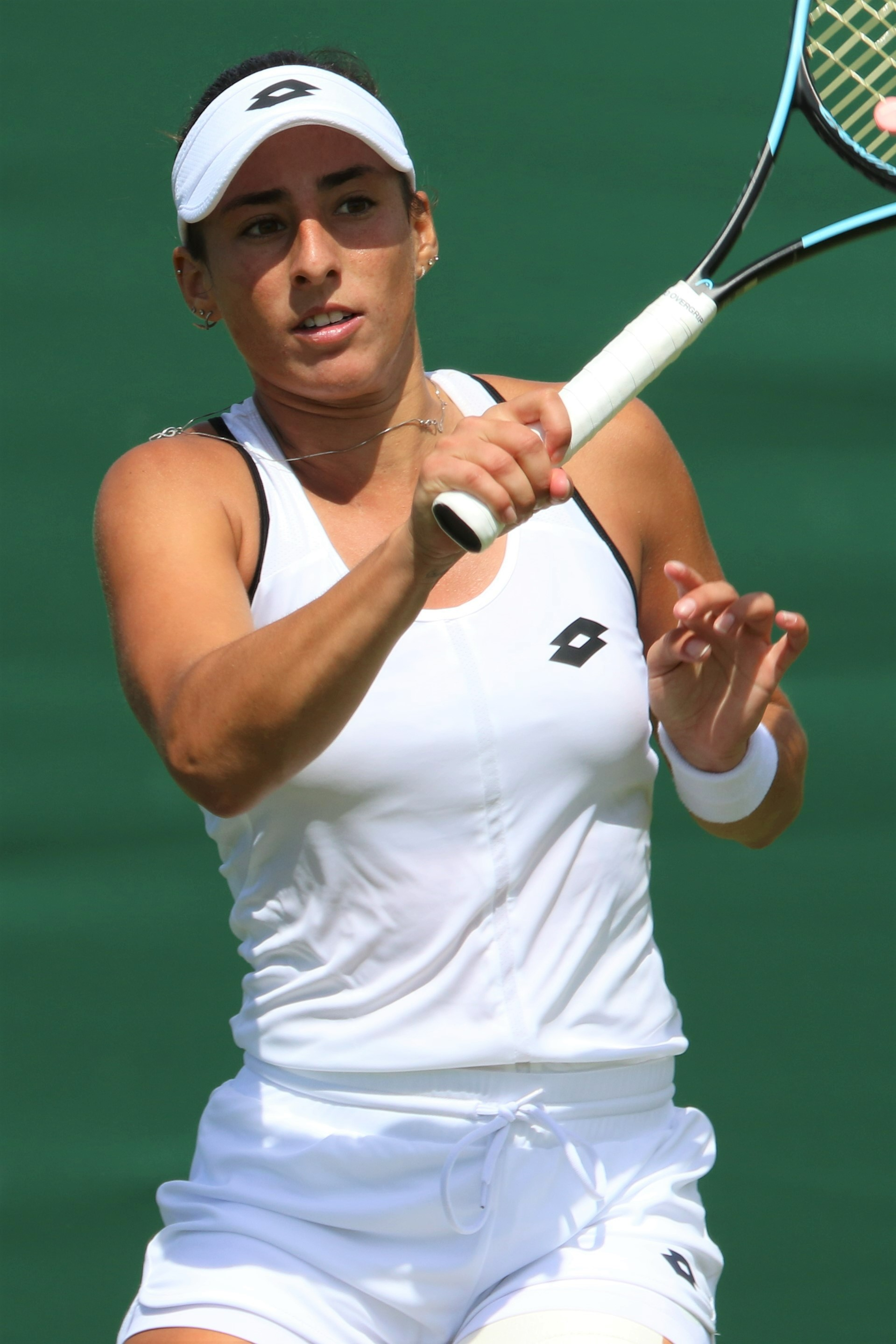
- Mendez at the 2022 Wimbledon Championships
- Country (sports): Australia
- Residence: Valencia, Spain
- Born: 15 May 1999 (age 25); Sydney, Australia
- Plays: Right (two-handed backhand)
- Prize money: $338,629

Singles
- Career record: 255–166
- Career titles: 13 ITF
- Highest ranking: No. 198 (21 March 2022)
- Current ranking: No. 514 (11 November 2024)

Grand Slam singles results
- Australian Open: Q2 (2022)
- French Open: Q3 (2022)
- Wimbledon: Q1 (2022)
- US Open: Q1 (2022)

Doubles
- Career record: 79–62
- Career titles: 5 ITF
- Highest ranking: No. 304 (20 September 2021)
- Current ranking: No. 716 (11 November 2024)

Grand Slam doubles results
- Australian Open: 1R (2022)
- Last updated on: 11 November 2024.

Seone Mendez (born 15 May 1999) is an Australian tennis player of Argentine descent.

Mendez has career-high WTA rankings of 198 in singles, achieved on 21 March 2022, and 304 in doubles, set on 20 September 2021. She has won thirteen ITF singles titles and five ITF doubles titles.

== Career ==
=== 2021 ===
In July 2021, Mendez made her WTA Tour debut at the Winners Open where she qualified for the main draw, defeating Irina Fetecău in the final qualifying round. She went on to reach the quarterfinal in her WTA Tour debut, losing in three sets to former world No. 9, Andrea Petkovic.

In October 2021, Mendez reached a career-high ranking of 206 and entered the Australian top 10.

=== 2022 ===
In January, she reached the second round of the 2022 Australian Open qualifying.

== Personal life ==
Mendez is the daughter of Natalia and footballer Gabriel Mendez, and the sister of Gian Mendez.

== ITF Circuit finals ==
=== Singles: 16 (13 titles, 3 runner–ups) ===
Legend W40 tournaments W25 tournaments W15 tournaments	Finals by surface Clay (13–3)

Result	W–L	Date	Tournament	Tier	Surface	Opponent	Score
Win	1–0	Jun 2017	ITF Hammamet, Tunisia	W15	Clay	(Chile) Fernanda Brito	6–2, 6–1
Win	2–0	Jun 2017	ITF Hammamet, Tunisia	W15	Clay	(Spain) Andrea Lázaro García	6–1, 3–6, 6–0
Loss	2–1	Aug 2017	ITF Mrągowo, Poland	W15	Clay	(Poland) Marta Leśniak	4–6, 4–6
Win	3–1	Feb 2018	ITF Palmanova, Spain	W15	Clay	(Spain) Marina Bassols Ribera	6–7^{(3)}, 6–1, 6–2
Win	4–1	Mar 2019	ITF Antalya, Turkey	W15	Clay	(North Macedonia) Lina Gjorcheska	6–4, 6–0
Win	5–1	Mar 2019	ITF Antalya, Turkey	W15	Clay	(Japan) Yuki Naito	7–5, 7–6^{(3)}
Win	6–1	May 2019	ITF Antalya, Turkey	W15	Clay	(Bulgaria) Gebriela Mihaylova	6–1, 6–1
Win	7–1	Jul 2019	ITF Prokuplje, Serbia	W15	Clay	(Spain) Ana Lantigua de la Nuez	6–2, 6–3
Win	8–1	Jul 2019	ITF Prokuplje, Serbia	W15	Clay	(Russia) Darya Astakhova	6–4, 6–1
Win	9–1	Sep 2019	ITF Tabarka, Tunisia	W15	Clay	(Switzerland) Karin Kennel	6–7^{(7)}, 6–1, 6–3
Loss	9–2	Sep 2019	ITF Santa Margherita Di Pula, Italy	W25	Clay	(Italy) Martina Trevisan	4–6, 7–5, 5–7
Win	10–2	Nov 2019	ITF Naples, United States	W25	Clay	(Hungary) Panna Udvardy	6–3, 6–4
Win	11–2	Mar 2021	ITF Amiens, France	W15+H	Clay	(Argentina) Paula Ormaechea	6–4, 6–2
Win	12–2	Feb 2023	ITF Antalya, Turkey	W25	Clay	(Slovenia) Nina Potočnik	6–2, 7–5
Loss	12–3	May 2023	ITF Otočec, Slovenia	W40	Clay	(Slovakia) Rebecca Šramková	3–6, 6–7^{(2)}
Win	13–3	Jul 2023	ITF Getxo, Spain	W25	Clay	(Greece) Martha Matoula	6–2, 6–4

=== Doubles: 13 (5 titles, 8 runner-ups) ===
Legend W60 tournaments W25/35 tournaments W15 tournaments	Finals by surface Hard (0–1) Clay (5–6) Carpet (0–1)

Result	W–L	Date	Tournament	Tier	Surface	Partner	Opponents	Score
Loss	0–1	Jul 2017	ITF Imola, Italy	W25	Carpet (o)	(Greece) Eleni Kordolaimi	(Spain) Estrella Cabeza Candela (Brazil) Paula Cristina Gonçalves	3–6, 6–1, [3–10]
Loss	0–2	Feb 2018	ITF Manacor, Spain	W15	Clay	(Moldova) Alexandra Perper	(Spain) Irene Burillo Escorihuela (Spain) Olga Parres Azcoitia	4–6, 6–2, [7–10]
Win	1–2	Apr 2018	Nana Trophy, Tunisia	W25	Clay	(Ukraine) Maryna Chernyshova	(Russia) Amina Anshba (Italy) Anastasia Grymalska	7–6^{(5)}, 6–4
Loss	1–3	May 2019	ITF Cairo, Egypt	W15	Clay	(Ecuador) Charlotte Römer	(Slovakia) Alica Rusová (Switzerland) Simona Waltert	5–7, 6–0, [6–10]
Win	2–3	Sep 2019	ITF Tabarka, Tunisia	W15	Clay	(Netherlands) Merel Hoedt	(Australia) Alicia Smith (Belgium) Chelsea Vanhoutte	6–3, 7–5
Loss	2–4	Sep 2019	Open de Valencia, Spain	W60+H	Clay	(Venezuela) Andrea Gámiz	(Romania) Irina Bara (Spain) Rebeka Masarova	4–6, 6–7^{(2)}
Loss	2–5	Nov 2019	ITF Naples, United States	W25	Clay	(Croatia) Lea Bošković	(Mexico) María Portillo Ramírez (Romania) Gabriela Talabă	5–7, 2–6
Loss	2–6	Feb 2021	ITF Poitiers, France	W25	Hard	(France) Estelle Cascino	(Italy) Federica di Sarra (Italy) Camilla Rosatello	4–6, 3–6
Win	3–6	Mar 2021	ITF Amiens, France	W15+H	Clay	(Mexico) María Portillo Ramírez	(France) Elsa Jacquemot (Andorra) Victoria Jiménez Kasintseva	6–4, 6–3
Loss	3–7	Feb 2023	ITF Tucumán, Argentina	W25	Clay	(Latvia) Daniela Vismane	(Colombia) María Herazo González (Netherlands) Lexie Stevens	6–2, 3–6, [8–10]
Win	4–7	Aug 2023	ITF Leipzig, Germany	W25+H	Clay	(France) Estelle Cascino	Julia Avdeeva (Romania) Arina Vasilescu	6–2, 6–7^{(4)}, [10–8]
Loss	4–8	Jul 2024	ITF Getxo, Spain	W35	Clay (i)	(Greece) Martha Matoula	(United States) Anna Rogers (United States) Alana Smith	0–6, 6–7^{(7)}
Win	5–8	Nov 2024	ITF Nules, Spain	W15	Clay	(Italy) Enola Chiesa	(Spain) Lorena Solar Donoso (Spain) Meritxell Teixidó García	6–2, 3–6, [10–4]
