= Open Ciudad de Valencia =

- 2023 Open Ciudad de Valencia

ITF Women's Tour
- Event name: Open Ciudad de Valencia
- Location: Valencia, Spain
- Venue: Club de Tenis Valencia
- Category: ITF Women's World Tennis Tour
- Surface: Clay
- Draw: 32S/32Q/16D
- Prize money: $100,000
- Website: www.openciudadvalencia.com

The Open Ciudad de Valencia is a tournament for professional female tennis players played on outdoor clay courts. The event is classified as a $100,000 ITF Women's Circuit tournament and has been held in Valencia, Spain since 2016. In 2022 and 2021, it was a $80k, in 2018 and 2017, it was a $60k event, and previously, from the beginning, classified as $25k ITF event.

== Past finals ==
=== Singles ===
Year	Champion	Runner-up	Score
2016	(Italy) Jasmine Paolini	(Netherlands) Quirine Lemoine	6–1, 2–6, 6–4
2017	(Romania) Irina Bara	(Serbia) Olga Danilović	5–7, 6–4, 6–0
2018	(Spain) Paula Badosa	(Spain) Aliona Bolsova	6–1, 4–6, 6–2
2019	(Russia) Varvara Gracheva	(Germany) Tamara Korpatsch	3–6, 6–2, 6–0
2020	tournament cancelled due to the COVID-19 pandemic		
2021	(Netherlands) Arantxa Rus	(Romania) Mihaela Buzărnescu	6–4, 7–6^{(7–3)}
2022	(Spain) Marina Bassols Ribera	(Switzerland) Ylena In-Albon	6–4, 6–0
2023	(Bulgaria) Viktoriya Tomova	(Romania) Jaqueline Cristian	7–5, 6–3

=== Doubles ===
Year	Champions	Runners-up	Score
2016	(North Macedonia) Lina Gjorcheska (Kazakhstan) Galina Voskoboeva	(Spain) Alicia Herrero Liñana (Russia) Ksenija Sharifova	6–0, 6–0
2017	(Spain) Cristina Bucșa (Russia) Yana Sizikova	(Venezuela) Andrea Gámiz (Spain) Georgina García Pérez	7–6^{(7–1)}, 7–6^{(7–5)}
2018	(Russia) Irina Khromacheva (Serbia) Nina Stojanović	(Greece) Valentini Grammatikopoulou (Mexico) Renata Zarazúa	6–1, 6–4
2019	(Romania) Irina Bara (Spain) Rebeka Masarova	(Venezuela) Andrea Gámiz (Australia) Seone Mendez	6–4, 7–6^{(7–2)}
2020	tournament cancelled due to the COVID-19 pandemic		
2021	(Spain) Aliona Bolsova (Venezuela) Andrea Gámiz	(Georgia (country)) Ekaterine Gorgodze (Brazil) Laura Pigossi	6–3, 6–4
2022	(Spain) Cristina Bucșa (Switzerland) Ylena In-Albon	Irina Khromacheva; Iryna Shymanovich	6–3, 6–2
2023	(Greece) Valentini Grammatikopoulou (Romania) Andreea Mitu	(Spain) Aliona Bolsova (Georgia (country)) Natela Dzalamidze	7–5, 6–4
