= 2026 WTA 125 tournaments =

Secondary women's tennis tournaments

Details
- Duration: 5 January – 13 December 2026
- Edition: 15th
- Tournaments: 68

Achievements (singles)
- Most titles: (Canada) Bianca Andreescu (Uzbekistan) Maria Timofeeva (3)
- Most finals: (Canada) Bianca Andreescu (5)

The WTA 125 tournaments are the secondary professional tennis circuit tournaments organised by the Women's Tennis Association. The 2026 calendar consists of sixty-eight tournaments, fifteen more than the tournaments staged in the previous year. The prize money of these tournaments ranges from $115,000 up to $225,000. A maximum of 125 points are offered to the champions of these events.

== Schedule ==
=== January ===
Week of	Tournament	Champions	Runners-up	Semifinalists	Quarterfinalists
January 5	Workday Canberra International; Canberra, Australia; Hard – $225,000 – 32S/32Q/16D; Singles – Doubles	(Chinese Taipei) Joanna Garland; 6–4, 6–2	(Uzbekistan) Polina Kudermetova	(Ukraine) Daria Snigur (Japan) Himeno Sakatsume	(Switzerland) Simona Waltert (Slovenia) Tamara Zidanšek (China) Yuan Yue (Georgia (country)) Ekaterine Gorgodze
January 5	Workday Canberra International; Canberra, Australia; Hard – $225,000 – 32S/32Q/16D; Singles – Doubles	Maria Kozyreva; Iryna Shymanovich; 6–7^{(9–11)}, 7–5, [10–8]	(Japan) Ena Shibahara; Vera Zvonareva	(Ukraine) Daria Snigur (Japan) Himeno Sakatsume	(Switzerland) Simona Waltert (Slovenia) Tamara Zidanšek (China) Yuan Yue (Georgia (country)) Ekaterine Gorgodze
January 26	Philippine Women's Open; Manila, Philippines; Hard – $115,000 – 32S/10Q/14D; Singles – Doubles	(Colombia) Camila Osorio; 2–6, 6–3, 7–5	(Croatia) Donna Vekić	Tatiana Prozorova (Argentina) Solana Sierra	(Belgium) Sofia Costoulas (China) Zhu Lin (Thailand) Lanlana Tararudee (Philippines) Alexandra Eala
January 26	Philippine Women's Open; Manila, Philippines; Hard – $115,000 – 32S/10Q/14D; Singles – Doubles	(Hong Kong) Eudice Chong (Chinese Taipei) Liang En-shuo; 2–6, 7–6^{(7–2)}, [10–6]	(United States) Quinn Gleason (United States) Sabrina Santamaria	Tatiana Prozorova (Argentina) Solana Sierra	(Belgium) Sofia Costoulas (China) Zhu Lin (Thailand) Lanlana Tararudee (Philippines) Alexandra Eala

=== February ===
Week of	Tournament	Champions	Runners-up	Semifinalists	Quarterfinalists
February 2	L&T Mumbai Open; Mumbai, India; Hard – $115,000 – 32S/16Q/8D; Singles – Doubles	(Thailand) Mananchaya Sawangkaew; 6–4, 6–3	(Austria) Lilli Tagger	(Thailand) Lanlana Tararudee (China) Tian Fangran	Tatiana Prozorova (France) Léolia Jeanjean (Japan) Mei Yamaguchi (Latvia) Darja Semeņistaja
February 2	L&T Mumbai Open; Mumbai, India; Hard – $115,000 – 32S/16Q/8D; Singles – Doubles	Polina Iatcenko; Elena Pridankina; 7–6^{(7–3)}, 1–6, [10–5]	(Argentina) Nicole Fossa Huergo (Thailand) Mananchaya Sawangkaew	(Thailand) Lanlana Tararudee (China) Tian Fangran	Tatiana Prozorova (France) Léolia Jeanjean (Japan) Mei Yamaguchi (Latvia) Darja Semeņistaja
February 9	Oeiras 1 Jamor Indoor; Oeiras, Portugal; Hard (i) – €100,000 – 32S/16Q/16D; Singles – Doubles	Alina Korneeva; 7–5, 6–1	(Czech Republic) Darja Vidmanova	(Portugal) Matilde Jorge (Poland) Maja Chwalińska	(Italy) Lucrezia Stefanini (Spain) Leyre Romero Gormaz (Netherlands) Suzan Lamens (Hungary) Dalma Gálfi
February 9	Oeiras 1 Jamor Indoor; Oeiras, Portugal; Hard (i) – €100,000 – 32S/16Q/16D; Singles – Doubles	(United States) Carmen Corley (United States) Ivana Corley; 2–6, 6–0, [10–4]	(United Kingdom) Emily Appleton (Japan) Makoto Ninomiya	(Portugal) Matilde Jorge (Poland) Maja Chwalińska	(Italy) Lucrezia Stefanini (Spain) Leyre Romero Gormaz (Netherlands) Suzan Lamens (Hungary) Dalma Gálfi
February 16	Oeiras 2 Jamor Indoor; Oeiras, Portugal; Hard (i) – €100,000 – 32S/16Q/16D; Singles – Doubles	(Ukraine) Daria Snigur; 6–3, 6–3	(Switzerland) Viktorija Golubic	(Serbia) Teodora Kostović (Netherlands) Suzan Lamens	(Spain) Kaitlin Quevedo (Portugal) Francisca Jorge (Bulgaria) Viktoriya Tomova (Austria) Sinja Kraus
February 16	Oeiras 2 Jamor Indoor; Oeiras, Portugal; Hard (i) – €100,000 – 32S/16Q/16D; Singles – Doubles	(Slovakia) Viktória Hrunčáková (Czech Republic) Gabriela Knutson; 7–6^{(9–7)}, 6–3	(United States) Carmen Corley (United States) Ivana Corley	(Serbia) Teodora Kostović (Netherlands) Suzan Lamens	(Spain) Kaitlin Quevedo (Portugal) Francisca Jorge (Bulgaria) Viktoriya Tomova (Austria) Sinja Kraus
February 16	Open Arena Les Sables d'Olonne; Les Sables-d'Olonne, France; Hard (i) – €100,000 – 32S/8Q/7D; Singles – Doubles	(Czech Republic) Dominika Šalková; 6–4, 6–0	(Spain) Andrea Lázaro García	Alina Korneeva (France) Fiona Ferro	(United States) Carol Young Suh Lee (Germany) Mona Barthel (Belgium) Sofia Costoulas (France) Diana Martynov
February 16	Open Arena Les Sables d'Olonne; Les Sables-d'Olonne, France; Hard (i) – €100,000 – 32S/8Q/7D; Singles – Doubles	(United States) Carol Young Suh Lee (Czech Republic) Anna Sisková; 6–2, 6–3	(Spain) Aliona Bolsova (Spain) Irene Burillo	Alina Korneeva (France) Fiona Ferro	(United States) Carol Young Suh Lee (Germany) Mona Barthel (Belgium) Sofia Costoulas (France) Diana Martynov
February 16	Dow Tennis Classic; Midland, United States; Hard (i) – $115,000 – 32S/16Q/15D; Singles – Doubles	Alina Charaeva; 6–4, 7–6^{(7–4)}	(China) Guo Hanyu	(United States) Mary Stoiana (Czech Republic) Darja Vidmanova	(Canada) Katherine Sebov (United States) Elvina Kalieva (Japan) Nao Hibino (United States) Anna Frey
February 16	Dow Tennis Classic; Midland, United States; Hard (i) – $115,000 – 32S/16Q/15D; Singles – Doubles	(United States) Sabrina Santamaria (China) Tang Qianhui; Walkover	(United States) Alana Smith (United States) Mary Stoiana	(United States) Mary Stoiana (Czech Republic) Darja Vidmanova	(Canada) Katherine Sebov (United States) Elvina Kalieva (Japan) Nao Hibino (United States) Anna Frey
February 23	Megasaray Hotels Open; Antalya, Turkey; Clay – $115,000 – 32S/16Q/16D; Singles – Doubles	(Japan) Moyuka Uchijima; 7–5, 7–5	(Ukraine) Anhelina Kalinina	(Egypt) Mayar Sherif (Slovenia) Veronika Erjavec	(Hungary) Amarissa Tóth (Greece) Despina Papamichail (Italy) Nuria Brancaccio (Georgia (country)) Ekaterine Gorgodze
February 23	Megasaray Hotels Open; Antalya, Turkey; Clay – $115,000 – 32S/16Q/16D; Singles – Doubles	Maria Kozyreva; Iryna Shymanovich; 7–5, 6–1	(Japan) Momoko Kobori (Thailand) Peangtarn Plipuech	(Egypt) Mayar Sherif (Slovenia) Veronika Erjavec	(Hungary) Amarissa Tóth (Greece) Despina Papamichail (Italy) Nuria Brancaccio (Georgia (country)) Ekaterine Gorgodze

=== March ===
Week of	Tournament	Champions	Runners-up	Semifinalists	Quarterfinalists
March 2	Megasaray Hotels Open 2 Antalya, Turkey; Clay – $115,000 – 32S/16Q/16D; Singles – Doubles	(Ukraine) Anhelina Kalinina; 6–3, 3–6, 6–2	(Ukraine) Oleksandra Oliynykova	(Japan) Moyuka Uchijima (Poland) Katarzyna Kawa	(Spain) Guiomar Maristany (Poland) Maja Chwalińska (Slovenia) Tamara Zidanšek (Hungary) Panna Udvardy
March 2	Megasaray Hotels Open 2 Antalya, Turkey; Clay – $115,000 – 32S/16Q/16D; Singles – Doubles	(France) Estelle Cascino (Argentina) Nicole Fossa Huergo; 7–5, 7–6^{(8–6)}	(Czech Republic) Jesika Malečková (Czech Republic) Miriam Škoch	(Japan) Moyuka Uchijima (Poland) Katarzyna Kawa	(Spain) Guiomar Maristany (Poland) Maja Chwalińska (Slovenia) Tamara Zidanšek (Hungary) Panna Udvardy
March 9	Austin 125; Austin, United States; Hard – $115,000 – 32S/8Q/8D; Singles – Doubles	(Thailand) Lanlana Tararudee; 6–3, 3–6, 6–3	(Canada) Bianca Andreescu	(Spain) Paula Badosa (Australia) Kimberly Birrell	(Austria) Sinja Kraus (Australia) Emerson Jones; Anastasia Zakharova (United States) McCartney Kessler
March 9	Austin 125; Austin, United States; Hard – $115,000 – 32S/8Q/8D; Singles – Doubles	(Chinese Taipei) Chan Hao-ching (Japan) Miyu Kato; 6–2, 6–3	(Netherlands) Isabelle Haverlag (United States) Sabrina Santamaria	(Spain) Paula Badosa (Australia) Kimberly Birrell	(Austria) Sinja Kraus (Australia) Emerson Jones; Anastasia Zakharova (United States) McCartney Kessler
March 9	Megasaray Hotels Open 3 Antalya, Turkey; Clay – $115,000 – 32S/16Q/16D; Singles – Doubles	(Ukraine) Anhelina Kalinina; 6–0, 6–3	(Slovenia) Tamara Zidanšek	(Poland) Katarzyna Kawa (Slovenia) Veronika Erjavec	Alina Charaeva (France) Carole Monnet (Italy) Nuria Brancaccio (Uzbekistan) Polina Kudermetova
March 9	Megasaray Hotels Open 3 Antalya, Turkey; Clay – $115,000 – 32S/16Q/16D; Singles – Doubles	Maria Kozyreva; Iryna Shymanovich; 7–6^{(9–7)}, 6–4	(Poland) Maja Chwalińska (Czech Republic) Jesika Malečková	(Poland) Katarzyna Kawa (Slovenia) Veronika Erjavec	Alina Charaeva (France) Carole Monnet (Italy) Nuria Brancaccio (Uzbekistan) Polina Kudermetova
March 23	Dubrovnik Open; Dubrovnik, Croatia; Clay – $115,000 – 32S/15Q/8D; Singles – Doubles	(Spain) Andrea Lázaro García; 3–6, 6–4, 6–3	(Ukraine) Anhelina Kalinina	(Egypt) Mayar Sherif (Slovenia) Tamara Zidanšek	Alina Charaeva (Spain) Leyre Romero Gormaz (Slovenia) Polona Hercog (Slovenia) Veronika Erjavec
March 23	Dubrovnik Open; Dubrovnik, Croatia; Clay – $115,000 – 32S/15Q/8D; Singles – Doubles	(Czech Republic) Anastasia Dețiuc (Czech Republic) Dominika Šalková; 7–5, 6–4	(Czech Republic) Jesika Malečková (Czech Republic) Miriam Škoch	(Egypt) Mayar Sherif (Slovenia) Tamara Zidanšek	Alina Charaeva (Spain) Leyre Romero Gormaz (Slovenia) Polona Hercog (Slovenia) Veronika Erjavec

=== April ===
Week of	Tournament	Champions	Runners-up	Semifinalists	Quarterfinalists
April 6	Grand Prix Open Villa de Madrid; Madrid, Spain; Clay – €100,000 – 32S/16Q/15D; Singles – Doubles	(Italy) Lisa Pigato; 6–4, 6–0	(Spain) Marina Bassols Ribera	(Uzbekistan) Polina Kudermetova (Spain) Ane Mintegi del Olmo	Oksana Selekhmeteva (North Macedonia) Lina Gjorcheska (Armenia) Elina Avanesyan (United States) Elvina Kalieva
April 6	Grand Prix Open Villa de Madrid; Madrid, Spain; Clay – €100,000 – 32S/16Q/15D; Singles – Doubles	(Spain) Irene Burillo; Elena Pridankina; 4–6, 6–3, [10–3]	(Romania) Irina Bara (Latvia) Darja Semeņistaja	(Uzbekistan) Polina Kudermetova (Spain) Ane Mintegi del Olmo	Oksana Selekhmeteva (North Macedonia) Lina Gjorcheska (Armenia) Elina Avanesyan (United States) Elvina Kalieva
April 13	Oeiras Jamor Ladies Open; Oeiras, Portugal; Clay – €195,652 – 32S/16Q/16D; Singles – Doubles	(Poland) Maja Chwalińska; 6–1, 6–3	(Austria) Sinja Kraus	(United States) Robin Montgomery (Croatia) Petra Marčinko	(Switzerland) Simona Waltert (Netherlands) Suzan Lamens (Slovakia) Rebecca Šramková (Latvia) Darja Semeņistaja
April 13	Oeiras Jamor Ladies Open; Oeiras, Portugal; Clay – €195,652 – 32S/16Q/16D; Singles – Doubles	(Slovenia) Veronika Erjavec (France) Kristina Mladenovic; 6–2, 7–5	(Switzerland) Naïma Karamoko (Latvia) Darja Semeņistaja	(United States) Robin Montgomery (Croatia) Petra Marčinko	(Switzerland) Simona Waltert (Netherlands) Suzan Lamens (Slovakia) Rebecca Šramková (Latvia) Darja Semeņistaja
April 20	Oeiras Open CETO; Oeiras, Portugal; Clay – €100,000 – 32S/16Q/16D; Singles – Doubles	(France) Fiona Ferro; 6–3, 0–6, 6–1	(Uzbekistan) Polina Kudermetova	(United States) Whitney Osuigwe (Poland) Linda Klimovičová	(Italy) Lucia Bronzetti (Latvia) Darja Semeņistaja; Elena Pridankina (China) Yuan Yue
April 20	Oeiras Open CETO; Oeiras, Portugal; Clay – €100,000 – 32S/16Q/16D; Singles – Doubles	(Belgium) Sofia Costoulas (Portugal) Matilde Jorge; 6–4, 6–2	(Belgium) Magali Kempen (Belgium) Lara Salden	(United States) Whitney Osuigwe (Poland) Linda Klimovičová	(Italy) Lucia Bronzetti (Latvia) Darja Semeņistaja; Elena Pridankina (China) Yuan Yue
April 27	L'Open 35 de Saint-Malo; Saint-Malo, France; Clay – €100,000 – 32S/16Q/16D; Singles – Doubles	(Japan) Moyuka Uchijima; 6–7^{(2–7)}, 6–3, 6–1	(Czech Republic) Tereza Valentová	Anna Blinkova (France) Jessika Ponchet	(Austria) Lilli Tagger (China) Yuan Yue (Switzerland) Viktorija Golubic (Belgium) Sofia Costoulas
April 27	L'Open 35 de Saint-Malo; Saint-Malo, France; Clay – €100,000 – 32S/16Q/16D; Singles – Doubles	(Netherlands) Isabelle Haverlag (United Kingdom) Maia Lumsden; 6–4, 6–0	(Chinese Taipei) Chan Hao-ching (United States) Ivana Corley	Anna Blinkova (France) Jessika Ponchet	(Austria) Lilli Tagger (China) Yuan Yue (Switzerland) Viktorija Golubic (Belgium) Sofia Costoulas
April 27	Catalonia Open Solgironès; La Bisbal d'Empordà, Spain; Clay – €100,000 – 32S/8Q/8D; Singles – Doubles	(Australia) Daria Kasatkina; 2–6, 6–3, 7–5	(Germany) Tamara Korpatsch	(Spain) Sara Sorribes Tormo (Spain) Marina Bassols Ribera	Alina Charaeva; Elena Pridankina (Germany) Caroline Werner (Brazil) Beatriz Haddad Maia
April 27	Catalonia Open Solgironès; La Bisbal d'Empordà, Spain; Clay – €100,000 – 32S/8Q/8D; Singles – Doubles	Elena Pridankina (China) Tang Qianhui; 6–1, 6–3	(Slovakia) Tereza Mihalíková (United Kingdom) Olivia Nicholls	(Spain) Sara Sorribes Tormo (Spain) Marina Bassols Ribera	Alina Charaeva; Elena Pridankina (Germany) Caroline Werner (Brazil) Beatriz Haddad Maia
April 27	Huzhou Open; Huzhou, China; Clay – $115,000 – 32S/16Q/16D; Singles – Doubles	(Poland) Katarzyna Kawa; 6–0, 6–4	(Slovenia) Veronika Erjavec	(China) Wang Xiyu (China) Guo Hanyu	(China) Zheng Wushuang (Slovenia) Polona Hercog; Varvara Panshina; Rada Zolotareva
April 27	Huzhou Open; Huzhou, China; Clay – $115,000 – 32S/16Q/16D; Singles – Doubles	Sofya Lansere; Anastasia Zolotareva; 6–4, 6–1	(Japan) Hiroko Kuwata (Chinese Taipei) Li Yu-yun	(China) Wang Xiyu (China) Guo Hanyu	(China) Zheng Wushuang (Slovenia) Polona Hercog; Varvara Panshina; Rada Zolotareva

=== May ===
Week of	Tournament	Champions	Runners-up	Semifinalists	Quarterfinalists
May 4	İstanbul Open; Istanbul, Turkey; Clay – $115,000 – 32S/11Q/16D; Singles – Doubles	(Uzbekistan) Maria Timofeeva; 6–4, 6–2	(Croatia) Donna Vekić	(Spain) Guiomar Maristany (France) Alice Tubello	(Serbia) Mia Ristić (Brazil) Laura Pigossi (Uzbekistan) Polina Kudermetova (United Kingdom) Francesca Jones
May 4	İstanbul Open; Istanbul, Turkey; Clay – $115,000 – 32S/11Q/16D; Singles – Doubles	Maria Kozyreva (Brazil) Laura Pigossi; 6–4, 4–6, [10–7]	(Czech Republic) Anastasia Dețiuc (Japan) Makoto Ninomiya	(Spain) Guiomar Maristany (France) Alice Tubello	(Serbia) Mia Ristić (Brazil) Laura Pigossi (Uzbekistan) Polina Kudermetova (United Kingdom) Francesca Jones
May 4	Jiangxi Open; Jiujiang, China; Hard – $115,000 – 32S/12Q/16D; Singles – Doubles	(Chinese Taipei) Liang En-shuo; 3–6, 6–4, 6–1	(China) You Xiaodi	(China) Yao Xinxin (China) Bai Zhuoxuan	(Thailand) Lanlana Tararudee (United Kingdom) Heather Watson (Australia) Lizette Cabrera (Japan) Hayu Kinoshita
May 4	Jiangxi Open; Jiujiang, China; Hard – $115,000 – 32S/12Q/16D; Singles – Doubles	(Chinese Taipei) Lee Ya-hsin (China) Ye Qiuyu; 2–6, 6–2, [11–9]	(China) Dang Yiming (China) You Xiaodi	(China) Yao Xinxin (China) Bai Zhuoxuan	(Thailand) Lanlana Tararudee (United Kingdom) Heather Watson (Australia) Lizette Cabrera (Japan) Hayu Kinoshita
May 11	Parma Ladies Open; Parma, Italy; Clay – €100,000 – 32S/8Q/12D; Singles – Doubles	(Ukraine) Dayana Yastremska; 6–3, 6–3	(Czech Republic) Barbora Krejčíková	(Colombia) Camila Osorio (Spain) Jéssica Bouzas Maneiro	(Czech Republic) Dominika Šalková (Switzerland) Viktorija Golubic (Argentina) Solana Sierra (Switzerland) Susan Bandecchi
May 11	Parma Ladies Open; Parma, Italy; Clay – €100,000 – 32S/8Q/12D; Singles – Doubles	(Chinese Taipei) Cho I-hsuan (Chinese Taipei) Cho Yi-tsen; 6–2, 6–2	(Italy) Marta Lombardini (Italy) Federica Urgesi	(Colombia) Camila Osorio (Spain) Jéssica Bouzas Maneiro	(Czech Republic) Dominika Šalková (Switzerland) Viktorija Golubic (Argentina) Solana Sierra (Switzerland) Susan Bandecchi
May 11	Trophée Clarins; Paris, France; Clay – €100,000 – 32S/8Q/8D; Singles – Doubles	(France) Diane Parry; 3–6, 3–3 ret.	(United States) Madison Keys	(Ukraine) Yuliia Starodubtseva; Alina Charaeva	Anastasia Zakharova (United States) Katie Volynets (Kazakhstan) Yulia Putintseva; Aliaksandra Sasnovich
May 11	Trophée Clarins; Paris, France; Clay – €100,000 – 32S/8Q/8D; Singles – Doubles	(Japan) Shuko Aoyama (Chinese Taipei) Liang En-shuo; 7–6^{(7–5)}, 6–2	(Ukraine) Lyudmyla Kichenok (United States) Desirae Krawczyk	(Ukraine) Yuliia Starodubtseva; Alina Charaeva	Anastasia Zakharova (United States) Katie Volynets (Kazakhstan) Yulia Putintseva; Aliaksandra Sasnovich

=== June ===
Week of	Tournament	Champions	Runners-up	Semifinalists	Quarterfinalists
June 1	Lexus Birmingham Open; Birmingham, United Kingdom; Grass – $225,000 – 32S/24Q/16D; Singles – Doubles	(Philippines) Alexandra Eala; 5–7, 6–3, 7–5	(Czech Republic) Nikola Bartůňková	(Switzerland) Rebeka Masarova (United States) Ashlyn Krueger	(Thailand) Mananchaya Sawangkaew (United States) Mary Stoiana (United Kingdom) Mika Stojsavljevic (Australia) Taylah Preston
June 1	Lexus Birmingham Open; Birmingham, United Kingdom; Grass – $225,000 – 32S/24Q/16D; Singles – Doubles	(Australia) Talia Gibson (Indonesia) Janice Tjen; 6–4, 6–3	(United Kingdom) Harriet Dart (United Kingdom) Maia Lumsden	(Switzerland) Rebeka Masarova (United States) Ashlyn Krueger	(Thailand) Mananchaya Sawangkaew (United States) Mary Stoiana (United Kingdom) Mika Stojsavljevic (Australia) Taylah Preston
June 1	Open delle Puglie Trofeo; Foggia, Italy; Clay – €100,000 – 32S/8Q/8D; Singles – Doubles	(Spain) Leyre Romero Gormaz; 7–5, 0–6, 6–2	(Italy) Tyra Caterina Grant	(Italy) Lucia Bronzetti; Darya Astakhova	(Italy) Giorgia Pedone (France) Carole Monnet (Italy) Tatiana Pieri (France) Chloé Paquet
June 1	Open delle Puglie Trofeo; Foggia, Italy; Clay – €100,000 – 32S/8Q/8D; Singles – Doubles	(Chinese Taipei) Cho I-hsuan (Chinese Taipei) Cho Yi-tsen; 4–6, 6–3, [10–4]	(France) Estelle Cascino (Slovenia) Nika Radišić	(Italy) Lucia Bronzetti; Darya Astakhova	(Italy) Giorgia Pedone (France) Carole Monnet (Italy) Tatiana Pieri (France) Chloé Paquet
June 1	Makarska Open; Makarska, Croatia; Clay – $115,000 – 32S/8Q/8D; Singles – Doubles	(Uzbekistan) Maria Timofeeva; 6–2, 6–3	(Latvia) Darja Semeņistaja	(Armenia) Elina Avanesyan (Spain) Sara Sorribes Tormo	(Czech Republic) Barbora Palicová (Spain) Andrea Lázaro García (Germany) Noma Noha Akugue (Morocco) Yasmine Kabbaj
June 1	Makarska Open; Makarska, Croatia; Clay – $115,000 – 32S/8Q/8D; Singles – Doubles	(Netherlands) Isabelle Haverlag (Switzerland) Simona Waltert; 2–2 ret.	(Brazil) Ingrid Martins; Ekaterina Ovcharenko	(Armenia) Elina Avanesyan (Spain) Sara Sorribes Tormo	(Czech Republic) Barbora Palicová (Spain) Andrea Lázaro García (Germany) Noma Noha Akugue (Morocco) Yasmine Kabbaj
June 8	Lexus Ilkley Open; Ilkley, United Kingdom; Grass – $225,000 – 32S/24Q/16D; Singles – Doubles	(United States) Ashlyn Krueger; 7–5, 6–2	(Switzerland) Céline Naef	(Czech Republic) Darja Vidmanova (United States) Mary Stoiana	(United Kingdom) Katie Swan (United States) Elizabeth Mandlik; Tatiana Prozorova (France) Harmony Tan
June 8	Lexus Ilkley Open; Ilkley, United Kingdom; Grass – $225,000 – 32S/24Q/16D; Singles – Doubles	(United Kingdom) Freya Christie (United Kingdom) Eden Silva; 1–6, 6–4, [10–7]	(United Kingdom) Madeleine Brooks (United Kingdom) Amelia Rajecki	(Czech Republic) Darja Vidmanova (United States) Mary Stoiana	(United Kingdom) Katie Swan (United States) Elizabeth Mandlik; Tatiana Prozorova (France) Harmony Tan
June 8	Memorial Eugenio Fontana; Modena, Italy; Clay – €100,000 – 32S/8Q/8D; Singles – Doubles	(Poland) Katarzyna Kawa; 6–1, 4–6, 7–6^{(8–6)}	(Italy) Lucia Bronzetti	(Andorra) Victoria Jiménez Kasintseva (Czech Republic) Laura Samson	(Spain) Leyre Romero Gormaz (Czech Republic) Dominika Šalková (Italy) Nuria Brancaccio (Spain) Kaitlin Quevedo
June 8	Memorial Eugenio Fontana; Modena, Italy; Clay – €100,000 – 32S/8Q/8D; Singles – Doubles	(Spain) Yvonne Cavallé Reimers (Belgium) Lara Salden; 6–3, 6–4	(Georgia (country)) Ekaterine Gorgodze (Switzerland) Naïma Karamoko	(Andorra) Victoria Jiménez Kasintseva (Czech Republic) Laura Samson	(Spain) Leyre Romero Gormaz (Czech Republic) Dominika Šalková (Italy) Nuria Brancaccio (Spain) Kaitlin Quevedo
June 15	Internazionali Femminili di Brescia; Brescia, Italy; Clay – €100,000 – 32S/16Q/16D; Singles – Doubles	(Egypt) Mayar Sherif; 6–4, 6–3	(China) Wang Xiyu	(Ukraine) Anastasiia Sobolieva (Bulgaria) Elizara Yaneva	(Argentina) Luisina Giovannini (Spain) Ane Mintegi del Olmo (France) Tiantsoa Rakotomanga Rajaonah (Georgia (country)) Ekaterine Gorgodze
June 15	Internazionali Femminili di Brescia; Brescia, Italy; Clay – €100,000 – 32S/16Q/16D; Singles – Doubles	(Slovenia) Dalila Jakupović (Slovenia) Nika Radišić; 6–4, 7–5	(Romania) Irina Bara (Switzerland) Naïma Karamoko	(Ukraine) Anastasiia Sobolieva (Bulgaria) Elizara Yaneva	(Argentina) Luisina Giovannini (Spain) Ane Mintegi del Olmo (France) Tiantsoa Rakotomanga Rajaonah (Georgia (country)) Ekaterine Gorgodze
June 15	Figueira da Foz Open; Figueira da Foz, Portugal; Hard – €100,000 – 32S/16Q/8D; Singles – Doubles	(Czech Republic) Darja Vidmanova; 6–2, 6–3	(Turkey) Ayla Aksu	(South Korea) Ku Yeon-woo; Alina Charaeva	(Poland) Martyna Kubka (Switzerland) Jil Teichmann (Switzerland) Susan Bandecchi (Belgium) Jeline Vandromme
June 15	Figueira da Foz Open; Figueira da Foz, Portugal; Hard – €100,000 – 32S/16Q/8D; Singles – Doubles	(Slovakia) Viktória Hrunčáková (Slovakia) Katarína Kužmová; 6–4, 6–4	(Australia) Elena Micic (France) Kristina Mladenovic	(South Korea) Ku Yeon-woo; Alina Charaeva	(Poland) Martyna Kubka (Switzerland) Jil Teichmann (Switzerland) Susan Bandecchi (Belgium) Jeline Vandromme

=== July ===
Week of	Tournament	Champions	Runners-up	Semifinalists	Quarterfinalists
July 6	Hall of Fame Open; Newport, United States; Grass – $225,000 – 32S/8Q/15D; Singles – Doubles	(Germany) Tatjana Maria; 6–2, 6–4	(United States) Katie Volynets	(Belgium) Greet Minnen (Thailand) Mananchaya Sawangkaew	(United States) Madison Brengle (United States) Elizabeth Mandlik (United States) Mary Stoiana (Italy) Lucrezia Stefanini
July 6	Hall of Fame Open; Newport, United States; Grass – $225,000 – 32S/8Q/15D; Singles – Doubles	Iryna Shymanovich (United States) Katie Volynets; 6–2, 7–6^{(8–6)}	(United States) Savannah Broadus (United States) Kylie Collins	(Belgium) Greet Minnen (Thailand) Mananchaya Sawangkaew	(United States) Madison Brengle (United States) Elizabeth Mandlik (United States) Mary Stoiana (Italy) Lucrezia Stefanini
July 6	Grand Est Open 88; Contrexéville, France; Clay – $115,000 – 32S/16Q/6D; Singles – Doubles	(Egypt) Mayar Sherif; 3–6, 7–6^{(7–0)}, 7–5	(Belgium) Jeline Vandromme	(France) Léolia Jeanjean (Italy) Aurora Zantedeschi	(Spain) Alicia Herrero Liñana (France) Alice Tubello (Malta) Francesca Curmi; Anna Blinkova
July 6	Grand Est Open 88; Contrexéville, France; Clay – $115,000 – 32S/16Q/6D; Singles – Doubles	(France) Estelle Cascino (Argentina) Nicole Fossa Huergo; 6–7^{(3–7)}, 6–2, [10–6]	(Spain) Yvonne Cavallé Reimers (Brazil) Laura Pigossi	(France) Léolia Jeanjean (Italy) Aurora Zantedeschi	(Spain) Alicia Herrero Liñana (France) Alice Tubello (Malta) Francesca Curmi; Anna Blinkova
July 6	Nordea Open; Båstad, Sweden; Clay – $115,000 – 32S/16D; Singles – Doubles	(Spain) Paula Badosa; 7–5, 7–5	(Switzerland) Simona Waltert	(Spain) Kaitlin Quevedo (Kazakhstan) Yulia Putintseva	(Spain) Irene Burillo (Spain) Leyre Romero Gormaz (Austria) Sinja Kraus (United States) Varvara Lepchenko
July 6	Nordea Open; Båstad, Sweden; Clay – $115,000 – 32S/16D; Singles – Doubles	(Colombia) Emiliana Arango (Switzerland) Simona Waltert; 6–4, 6–1	(United Kingdom) Alicia Barnett (France) Elixane Lechemia	(Spain) Kaitlin Quevedo (Kazakhstan) Yulia Putintseva	(Spain) Irene Burillo (Spain) Leyre Romero Gormaz (Austria) Sinja Kraus (United States) Varvara Lepchenko
July 13	Generali Open Ladies Kitzbühel; Kitzbühel, Austria; Clay – €100,000 – 32S/8Q/8D; Singles – Doubles	(Austria) Sinja Kraus; 6–3, 6–1	(Austria) Julia Grabher	(Slovenia) Veronika Erjavec (Spain) Marina Bassols Ribera	(Poland) Gina Feistel (Belgium) Jeline Vandromme (Argentina) María Lourdes Carlé; Erika Andreeva
July 13	Generali Open Ladies Kitzbühel; Kitzbühel, Austria; Clay – €100,000 – 32S/8Q/8D; Singles – Doubles	(United Kingdom) Alicia Barnett (France) Elixane Lechemia; 6–4, 6–3	(Spain) Yvonne Cavallé Reimers (Brazil) Laura Pigossi	(Slovenia) Veronika Erjavec (Spain) Marina Bassols Ribera	(Poland) Gina Feistel (Belgium) Jeline Vandromme (Argentina) María Lourdes Carlé; Erika Andreeva
July 13	ATV Bancomat Tennis Open; Rome, Italy; Clay – €100,000 – 32S/8Q/8D; Singles – Doubles	(United Kingdom) Francesca Jones; 6–3, 6–1	(Italy) Lucia Bronzetti	(Italy) Martina Trevisan (Italy) Nuria Brancaccio	(Bulgaria) Elizara Yaneva (Germany) Noma Noha Akugue (Italy) Deborah Chiesa (Argentina) Julia Riera
July 13	ATV Bancomat Tennis Open; Rome, Italy; Clay – €100,000 – 32S/8Q/8D; Singles – Doubles	(France) Estelle Cascino (China) Feng Shuo; 6–4, 6–4	(Croatia) Lucija Ćirić Bagarić (Slovenia) Nika Radišić	(Italy) Martina Trevisan (Italy) Nuria Brancaccio	(Bulgaria) Elizara Yaneva (Germany) Noma Noha Akugue (Italy) Deborah Chiesa (Argentina) Julia Riera
July 13	ENKA Open; Istanbul, Turkey; Hard – $115,000 – 32S/16Q/15D; Singles – Doubles	(Thailand) Lanlana Tararudee; 6–4, 4–6, 6–3	(Belgium) Hanne Vandewinkel	Anastasia Zakharova (Czech Republic) Vendula Valdmannová	Tatiana Prozorova (France) Harmony Tan; Aliona Falei; Vera Zvonareva
July 13	ENKA Open; Istanbul, Turkey; Hard – $115,000 – 32S/16Q/15D; Singles – Doubles	(Japan) Ena Shibahara; Vera Zvonareva; 6–3, 3–6, [10–8]	Tatiana Prozorova; Alexandra Shubladze	Anastasia Zakharova (Czech Republic) Vendula Valdmannová	Tatiana Prozorova (France) Harmony Tan; Aliona Falei; Vera Zvonareva
July 20	37° Palermo Ladies Open; Palermo, Italy; Clay – €100,000 – 32S/16Q/14D; Singles – Doubles	(United Kingdom) Francesca Jones; 6–0, 4–6, 7–6^{(8–6)}	(France) Fiona Ferro	Alevtina Ibragimova (Italy) Lucia Bronzetti	(Italy) Jennifer Ruggeri (France) Clara Burel (Germany) Mina Hodzic (Morocco) Yasmine Kabbaj
July 20	37° Palermo Ladies Open; Palermo, Italy; Clay – €100,000 – 32S/16Q/14D; Singles – Doubles	Anastasia Tikhonova (Slovenia) Tamara Zidanšek; 6–4, 6–4	(United States) Rasheeda McAdoo (Hungary) Adrienn Nagy	Alevtina Ibragimova (Italy) Lucia Bronzetti	(Italy) Jennifer Ruggeri (France) Clara Burel (Germany) Mina Hodzic (Morocco) Yasmine Kabbaj
July 27	AXERIA Open; Târgu Mureș, Romania; Clay – $115,000 – 32S/16Q/16D; Singles – Doubles	(Czech Republic) Laura Samson; 2–6, 6–3, 6–1	(Spain) Kaitlin Quevedo	(United Kingdom) Francesca Jones (Italy) Lucia Bronzetti	(France) Carole Monnet (France) Alice Ramé (Spain) Sara Sorribes Tormo (Serbia) Mia Ristić
July 27	AXERIA Open; Târgu Mureș, Romania; Clay – $115,000 – 32S/16Q/16D; Singles – Doubles	(Croatia) Lucija Ćirić Bagarić (Italy) Angelica Moratelli; 6–3, 1–6, [11–9]	(Spain) Yvonne Cavallé Reimers (Belgium) Lara Salden	(United Kingdom) Francesca Jones (Italy) Lucia Bronzetti	(France) Carole Monnet (France) Alice Ramé (Spain) Sara Sorribes Tormo (Serbia) Mia Ristić
July 27	Odlum Brown Van Open; Vancouver, Canada; Hard – $225,000 – 32S/16Q/14D; Singles – Doubles	(Australia) Taylah Preston; 7–6^{(7–5)}, 6–3	(Australia) Maddison Inglis	(Japan) Mai Hontama (Thailand) Mananchaya Sawangkaew	(Japan) Moyuka Uchijima (Japan) Himeno Sakatsume (United Kingdom) Harriet Dart (Australia) Emerson Jones
July 27	Odlum Brown Van Open; Vancouver, Canada; Hard – $225,000 – 32S/16Q/14D; Singles – Doubles	(United States) Caroline Dolehide (Canada) Alexandra Vagramov; 6–1, 3–6, [10–6]	(United States) Anna Rogers (United States) Allura Zamarripa	(Japan) Mai Hontama (Thailand) Mananchaya Sawangkaew	(Japan) Moyuka Uchijima (Japan) Himeno Sakatsume (United Kingdom) Harriet Dart (Australia) Emerson Jones

=== August ===
Week of	Tournament	Champions	Runners-up	Semifinalists	Quarterfinalists
August 3	T-Mobile Polish Open; Warsaw, Poland; Hard – €100,000 – 32S/8Q/8D; Singles – Doubles	(United States) Carol Young Suh Lee; 6–4, 7–5	(Czech Republic) Gabriela Knutson	(Czech Republic) Vendula Valdmannová (Bulgaria) Elizara Yaneva	(Poland) Weronika Falkowska (Switzerland) Susan Bandecchi (Germany) Mona Barthel (Lithuania) Justina Mikulskytė
August 3	T-Mobile Polish Open; Warsaw, Poland; Hard – €100,000 – 32S/8Q/8D; Singles – Doubles	(Poland) Weronika Falkowska (United States) Alana Smith; 6–3, 6–1	(Poland) Martyna Kubka (Poland) Alicja Rosolska	(Czech Republic) Vendula Valdmannová (Bulgaria) Elizara Yaneva	(Poland) Weronika Falkowska (Switzerland) Susan Bandecchi (Germany) Mona Barthel (Lithuania) Justina Mikulskytė
August 24	Ennoble Care Philly Open; Philadelphia, United States; Hard – $115,000 – 32S/8Q/16D; Singles – Doubles	(United States) Katie Volynets; 6–3, 7–5	(Czech Republic) Tereza Valentová	(Spain) Oksana Selekhmeteva (Austria) Julia Grabher	(China) Wang Xiyu (Thailand) Mananchaya Sawangkaew (United States) Kylie Collins (United States) Fiona Crawley
August 24	Ennoble Care Philly Open; Philadelphia, United States; Hard – $115,000 – 32S/8Q/16D; Singles – Doubles	(Netherlands) Isabelle Haverlag (Slovenia) Nika Radišić; 6–2, 1–6, [10–7]	(Czech Republic) Jesika Malečková (Czech Republic) Miriam Škoch	(Spain) Oksana Selekhmeteva (Austria) Julia Grabher	(China) Wang Xiyu (Thailand) Mananchaya Sawangkaew (United States) Kylie Collins (United States) Fiona Crawley

=== September ===
Week of	Tournament	Champions	Runners-up	Semifinalists	Quarterfinalists
September 7	Montreux Nestlé Open; Montreux, Switzerland; Clay – $115,000 – 32S/16Q/8D; Singles – Doubles	(France) Fiona Ferro; 6–1, 6–2	(Germany) Noma Noha Akugue	(Hungary) Dalma Gálfi (Spain) Guiomar Maristany	(Switzerland) Simona Waltert (Czech Republic) Lucie Havlíčková (Ukraine) Anastasiia Sobolieva (France) Clara Burel
September 7	Montreux Nestlé Open; Montreux, Switzerland; Clay – $115,000 – 32S/16Q/8D; Singles – Doubles	(Argentina) Nicole Fossa Huergo (Czech Republic) Lucie Havlíčková; 6–3, 6–7^{(4–7)}, [10–8]	(France) Estelle Cascino (China) Feng Shuo	(Hungary) Dalma Gálfi (Spain) Guiomar Maristany	(Switzerland) Simona Waltert (Czech Republic) Lucie Havlíčková (Ukraine) Anastasiia Sobolieva (France) Clara Burel
September 7	ATIK Antalya Open; Antalya, Turkey; Clay – $115,000 – 32S/16Q/16D; Singles – Doubles	(Bulgaria) Rositsa Dencheva; 7–5, 6–4	Alevtina Ibragimova	(Spain) Irene Burillo (Spain) Alicia Herrero Liñana	(Argentina) María Lourdes Carlé (Bulgaria) Elizara Yaneva (Italy) Aurora Zantedeschi (Germany) Eva Bennemann
September 7	ATIK Antalya Open; Antalya, Turkey; Clay – $115,000 – 32S/16Q/16D; Singles – Doubles	(Czech Republic) Aneta Kučmová (Czech Republic) Aneta Laboutková; 4–6, 6–2, [10–6]	Alevtina Ibragimova; Ksenia Zaytseva	(Spain) Irene Burillo (Spain) Alicia Herrero Liñana	(Argentina) María Lourdes Carlé (Bulgaria) Elizara Yaneva (Italy) Aurora Zantedeschi (Germany) Eva Bennemann
September 7	Kia Open; Barranquilla, Colombia; Hard – $115,000 – 32S/8Q/8D; Singles – Doubles	(United States) Claire Liu; 6–0, 2–6, 7–5	Anna Blinkova	(France) Léolia Jeanjean (France) Elsa Jacquemot	(United States) Carol Young Suh Lee (Spain) Kaitlin Quevedo; Anastasia Tikhonova (Argentina) Julia Riera
September 7	Kia Open; Barranquilla, Colombia; Hard – $115,000 – 32S/8Q/8D; Singles – Doubles	(United States) Rasheeda McAdoo (United States) Anna Rogers; 7–6^{(7–3)}, 6–3	(United States) Dalayna Hewitt (United States) Alana Smith	(France) Léolia Jeanjean (France) Elsa Jacquemot	(United States) Carol Young Suh Lee (Spain) Kaitlin Quevedo; Anastasia Tikhonova (Argentina) Julia Riera
September 14	BBVA Open Internacional de Valencia; Valencia, Spain; Clay – €100,000 – 32S/16Q/8D; Singles – Doubles	(France) Clara Burel; 4–6, 6–0, 6–2	(Spain) Alicia Herrero Liñana	(Morocco) Yasmine Kabbaj (Germany) Joëlle Steur	(Spain) Irene Burillo (Greece) Despina Papamichail (Spain) Guiomar Maristany (Spain) Andrea Lázaro García
September 14	BBVA Open Internacional de Valencia; Valencia, Spain; Clay – €100,000 – 32S/16Q/8D; Singles – Doubles	(Slovenia) Dalila Jakupović (Switzerland) Naïma Karamoko; 6–2, 6–3	(Spain) Irene Burillo (Argentina) Nicole Fossa Huergo	(Morocco) Yasmine Kabbaj (Germany) Joëlle Steur	(Spain) Irene Burillo (Greece) Despina Papamichail (Spain) Guiomar Maristany (Spain) Andrea Lázaro García
September 14	Zavarovalnica Triglav Ljubljana; Ljubljana, Slovenia; Clay – €100,000 – 32S/8Q/16D; Singles – Doubles	(Italy) Samira De Stefano; 3–6, 6–1, 7–5	(Germany) Mona Barthel	(Italy) Noemi Basiletti (Czech Republic) Laura Samson	(Serbia) Mia Ristić (Georgia (country)) Ekaterine Gorgodze (France) Alice Tubello (Ukraine) Anastasiia Sobolieva
September 14	Zavarovalnica Triglav Ljubljana; Ljubljana, Slovenia; Clay – €100,000 – 32S/8Q/16D; Singles – Doubles	(Croatia) Lucija Ćirić Bagarić (Italy) Angelica Moratelli; 6–7^{(4–7)}, 6–4, [10–5]	(France) Estelle Cascino (China) Feng Shuo	(Italy) Noemi Basiletti (Czech Republic) Laura Samson	(Serbia) Mia Ristić (Georgia (country)) Ekaterine Gorgodze (France) Alice Tubello (Ukraine) Anastasiia Sobolieva
September 14	Caldas da Rainha Ladies Open; Caldas da Rainha, Portugal; Hard – €100,000 – 32S/16Q/16D; Singles – Doubles	(Italy) Lisa Pigato; 6–4, 6–2	(Czech Republic) Gabriela Knutson	(Slovakia) Mia Pohánková (Belgium) Jeline Vandromme	(United States) Kylie Collins (United States) Malaika Rapolu (Switzerland) Susan Bandecchi (Portugal) Francisca Jorge
September 14	Caldas da Rainha Ladies Open; Caldas da Rainha, Portugal; Hard – €100,000 – 32S/16Q/16D; Singles – Doubles	(Australia) Gabriella Da Silva-Fick (Kazakhstan) Zhibek Kulambayeva; 3–6, 7–6^{(7–5)}, [10–7]	(India) Rutuja Bhosale (Australia) Elena Micic	(Slovakia) Mia Pohánková (Belgium) Jeline Vandromme	(United States) Kylie Collins (United States) Malaika Rapolu (Switzerland) Susan Bandecchi (Portugal) Francisca Jorge
September 21	Delta Motors Tolentino Open; Tolentino, Italy; Clay – €100,000 – 32S/16Q/15D; Singles – Doubles	(Austria) Julia Grabher; 7–6^{(7–5)}, 6–2	(Spain) Guiomar Maristany	(Italy) Jessica Pieri (Spain) Oksana Selekhmeteva	(Switzerland) Rebeka Masarova (Serbia) Mia Ristić (Italy) Nuria Brancaccio (Georgia (country)) Ekaterine Gorgodze
September 21	Delta Motors Tolentino Open; Tolentino, Italy; Clay – €100,000 – 32S/16Q/15D; Singles – Doubles	(Georgia (country)) Ekaterine Gorgodze (Greece) Despina Papamichail; 6–1, 6–2	(Czech Republic) Aneta Kučmová (Czech Republic) Aneta Laboutková	(Italy) Jessica Pieri (Spain) Oksana Selekhmeteva	(Switzerland) Rebeka Masarova (Serbia) Mia Ristić (Italy) Nuria Brancaccio (Georgia (country)) Ekaterine Gorgodze
September 21	Eupago Porto Open; Porto, Portugal; Hard – €100,000 – 32S/16Q/16D; Singles – Doubles	(Uzbekistan) Maria Timofeeva; 7–6^{(10–8)}, 6–2	(United States) Reese Brantmeier	(Slovakia) Mia Pohánková (Austria) Sinja Kraus	(Czech Republic) Gabriela Knutson (United Kingdom) Katie Swan (Portugal) Angelina Voloshchuk (Estonia) Elena Malygina
September 21	Eupago Porto Open; Porto, Portugal; Hard – €100,000 – 32S/16Q/16D; Singles – Doubles	(Portugal) Francisca Jorge (Portugal) Matilde Jorge; 6–3, 3–6, [10–3]	(Canada) Ariana Arseneault (Canada) Raphaëlle Lacasse	(Slovakia) Mia Pohánková (Austria) Sinja Kraus	(Czech Republic) Gabriela Knutson (United Kingdom) Katie Swan (Portugal) Angelina Voloshchuk (Estonia) Elena Malygina
September 21	Turk Telekom Ankara Open; Ankara, Turkey; Hard – $115,000 – 32S/14Q/16D; Singles – Doubles	(Turkey) Berfu Cengiz; 2–6, 6–4, 7–5	(Serbia) Teodora Kostović	(Turkey) Deniz Dilek; Polina Iatcenko	Anastasia Gasanova (China) Shi Han (China) Tian Fangran; Ksenia Zaytseva
September 21	Turk Telekom Ankara Open; Ankara, Turkey; Hard – $115,000 – 32S/14Q/16D; Singles – Doubles	(Poland) Weronika Falkowska (United States) Alana Smith; 6–2, 7–6^{(7–2)}	(Slovenia) Dalila Jakupović (Switzerland) Naïma Karamoko	(Turkey) Deniz Dilek; Polina Iatcenko	Anastasia Gasanova (China) Shi Han (China) Tian Fangran; Ksenia Zaytseva
September 28	Jingshan Tennis Open; Jingshan, China; Hard – $115,000 – 32S/15Q/16D; Singles – Doubles	Alexandra Shubladze; 6–3, 6–2	(Spain) Jéssica Bouzas Maneiro	Aliona Falei (Australia) Emerson Jones	Sofya Lansere (Spain) Sara Sorribes Tormo (Japan) Kyōka Okamura (China) Wei Sijia
September 28	Jingshan Tennis Open; Jingshan, China; Hard – $115,000 – 32S/15Q/16D; Singles – Doubles	(United Kingdom) Madeleine Brooks (United Kingdom) Amelia Rajecki; 6–7^{(5–7)}, 7–6^{(7–1)}, [10–6]	Sofya Lansere; Alexandra Shubladze	Aliona Falei (Australia) Emerson Jones	Sofya Lansere (Spain) Sara Sorribes Tormo (Japan) Kyōka Okamura (China) Wei Sijia
September 28	Adana Open; Adana, Turkey; Hard – $115,000 – 32S/15Q/16D; Singles – Doubles	(France) Léolia Jeanjean; 7–6^{(7–3)}, 4–6, 6–4	(France) Loïs Boisson	(Croatia) Antonia Ružić; Erika Andreeva	(Serbia) Teodora Kostović (Italy) Lucrezia Stefanini; Elena Pridankina (France) Anna Blinkova
September 28	Adana Open; Adana, Turkey; Hard – $115,000 – 32S/15Q/16D; Singles – Doubles	(Italy) Angelica Moratelli (Czech Republic) Vendula Valdmannová; 7–6^{(7–3)}, 6–4	(Slovenia) Dalila Jakupović (Belgium) Lara Salden	(Croatia) Antonia Ružić; Erika Andreeva	(Serbia) Teodora Kostović (Italy) Lucrezia Stefanini; Elena Pridankina (France) Anna Blinkova

=== October ===
Week of	Tournament	Champions	Runners-up	Semifinalists	Quarterfinalists
October 5	Suzhou Open; Suzhou, China; Hard – $115,000 – 32S/16Q/16D; Singles – Doubles	(Slovakia) Rebecca Šramková; 6–3, 6–1	(Japan) Kyōka Okamura	(Mexico) Renata Zarazúa (United States) Elvina Kalieva	Aliona Falei (Ukraine) Katarina Zavatska (China) Bai Zhuoxuan; Aliaksandra Sasnovich
October 5	Suzhou Open; Suzhou, China; Hard – $115,000 – 32S/16Q/16D; Singles – Doubles	(Chinese Taipei) Li Yu-yun (China) Zhang Ying; 6–3, 6–0	Tatiana Prozorova; Aliaksandra Sasnovich	(Mexico) Renata Zarazúa (United States) Elvina Kalieva	Aliona Falei (Ukraine) Katarina Zavatska (China) Bai Zhuoxuan; Aliaksandra Sasnovich
October 5	Samsun Open; Samsun, Turkey; Hard – $115,000 – 32S/16Q/14D; Singles – Doubles	(Turkey) Ayla Aksu; 7–5, 2–6, 6–2	(Italy) Lucrezia Stefanini	(Japan) Himeno Sakatsume (France) Anna Blinkova	(United States) Fiona Crawley (Switzerland) Simona Waltert; Polina Iatcenko (Canada) Bianca Andreescu
October 5	Samsun Open; Samsun, Turkey; Hard – $115,000 – 32S/16Q/14D; Singles – Doubles	Elena Pridankina; Anastasia Tikhonova; 7–6^{(7–5)}, 6–7^{(7–9)}, [10–3]	(India) Rutuja Bhosale (Australia) Elena Micic	(Japan) Himeno Sakatsume (France) Anna Blinkova	(United States) Fiona Crawley (Switzerland) Simona Waltert; Polina Iatcenko (Canada) Bianca Andreescu
October 12	Vanda Pharmaceuticals Mallorca; Women's Championships; Mallorca, Spain; Clay – €100,000 – 32S/16Q/8D; Singles – Doubles	(Spain) Ariana Geerlings; 6–2, 6–2	(Czech Republic) Laura Samson	(Malta) Francesca Curmi (Slovenia) Tamara Zidanšek	(Austria) Julia Grabher (Bulgaria) Elizara Yaneva (Switzerland) Rebeka Masarova (Spain) Andrea Lázaro García
October 12	Vanda Pharmaceuticals Mallorca; Women's Championships; Mallorca, Spain; Clay – €100,000 – 32S/16Q/8D; Singles – Doubles	(Croatia) Lucija Ćirić Bagarić (Italy) Angelica Moratelli; 2–6, 6–3, [12–10]	(Spain) Yvonne Cavallé Reimers (Brazil) Laura Pigossi	(Malta) Francesca Curmi (Slovenia) Tamara Zidanšek	(Austria) Julia Grabher (Bulgaria) Elizara Yaneva (Switzerland) Rebeka Masarova (Spain) Andrea Lázaro García
October 12	Lisboa Belém Open; Lisbon, Portugal; Clay – €100,000 – 32S/16Q/16D; Singles – Doubles	(France) Clara Burel; 6–4, 6–3	(Spain) Leyre Romero Gormaz	(Spain) Jéssica Bouzas Maneiro (Hungary) Dalma Gálfi	(Slovenia) Polona Hercog (Spain) Guiomar Maristany (France) Fiona Ferro (United Kingdom) Francesca Jones
October 12	Lisboa Belém Open; Lisbon, Portugal; Clay – €100,000 – 32S/16Q/16D; Singles – Doubles	(Slovenia) Dalila Jakupović (Slovenia) Nika Radišić; 6–3, 6–1	(Poland) Gina Feistel (Cyprus) Raluca Șerban	(Spain) Jéssica Bouzas Maneiro (Hungary) Dalma Gálfi	(Slovenia) Polona Hercog (Spain) Guiomar Maristany (France) Fiona Ferro (United Kingdom) Francesca Jones
October 12	RoveretOpen Città della Pace; Rovereto, Italy; Hard (i) – €100,000 – 32S/16Q/15D; Singles – Doubles	(Canada) Bianca Andreescu; 7–6^{(7–2)}, 6–2	(Czech Republic) Dominika Šalková	(Czech Republic) Lucie Havlíčková (Poland) Martyna Kubka	(Italy) Lucrezia Stefanini (Switzerland) Jil Teichmann (Czech Republic) Gabriela Knutson (Croatia) Lea Bošković
October 12	RoveretOpen Città della Pace; Rovereto, Italy; Hard (i) – €100,000 – 32S/16Q/15D; Singles – Doubles	(Netherlands) Isabelle Haverlag (Poland) Martyna Kubka; 6–1, 6–2	(Czech Republic) Dominika Šalková (Czech Republic) Anna Sisková	(Czech Republic) Lucie Havlíčková (Poland) Martyna Kubka	(Italy) Lucrezia Stefanini (Switzerland) Jil Teichmann (Czech Republic) Gabriela Knutson (Croatia) Lea Bošković
October 26	Valle D'Aosta Ladies Open; Courmayeur, Italy; Hard (i) – €100,000 – 32S/11Q/8D; Singles – Doubles	(Armenia) Alina Charaeva; 6–3, 6–4	(Germany) Noma Noha Akugue	(France) Anna Blinkova (France) Elsa Jacquemot	(Poland) Martyna Kubka (Turkey) Ayla Aksu (Bulgaria) Elizara Yaneva (Spain) Marina Bassols Ribera
October 26	Valle D'Aosta Ladies Open; Courmayeur, Italy; Hard (i) – €100,000 – 32S/11Q/8D; Singles – Doubles	(United States) Catherine Harrison (United States) Dalayna Hewitt; 6–4, 6–4	(United Kingdom) Madeleine Brooks (Sweden) Lisa Zaar	(France) Anna Blinkova (France) Elsa Jacquemot	(Poland) Martyna Kubka (Turkey) Ayla Aksu (Bulgaria) Elizara Yaneva (Spain) Marina Bassols Ribera
October 26	Querétaro Open; Querétaro, Mexico; Clay – $115,000 – 32S/16Q/8D; Singles – Doubles	(Canada) Bianca Andreescu; 6–1, 2–6, 6–3	(Germany) Tatjana Maria	(France) Fiona Ferro (France) Carole Monnet	(Ukraine) Valeriya Strakhova (United States) Elizabeth Mandlik (Spain) Alicia Herrero Liñana (Argentina) Nadia Podoroska
October 26	Querétaro Open; Querétaro, Mexico; Clay – $115,000 – 32S/16Q/8D; Singles – Doubles	(Belgium) Sofia Costoulas (Ukraine) Valeriya Strakhova; 6–1, 6–1	(Mexico) Marian Gómez Pezuela Cano (Argentina) Nadia Podoroska	(France) Fiona Ferro (France) Carole Monnet	(Ukraine) Valeriya Strakhova (United States) Elizabeth Mandlik (Spain) Alicia Herrero Liñana (Argentina) Nadia Podoroska
October 26	Curitiba Open; Curitiba, Brazil; Clay – $115,000 – 32S/8Q/8D; Singles – Doubles	(France) Alice Tubello; 3–6, 7–6^{(7–5)}, 7–6^{(7–2)}	(Austria) Julia Grabher	(Brazil) Nauhany Vitória Leme da Silva (Argentina) Julia Riera	(United Kingdom) Francesca Jones (Argentina) Jazmín Ortenzi (Argentina) Solana Sierra (Spain) Leyre Romero Gormaz
October 26	Curitiba Open; Curitiba, Brazil; Clay – $115,000 – 32S/8Q/8D; Singles – Doubles	(Slovenia) Dalila Jakupović (Slovenia) Nika Radišić; 6–4, 6–2	(Brazil) Nauhany Vitória Leme da Silva (Brazil) Laura Pigossi	(Brazil) Nauhany Vitória Leme da Silva (Argentina) Julia Riera	(United Kingdom) Francesca Jones (Argentina) Jazmín Ortenzi (Argentina) Solana Sierra (Spain) Leyre Romero Gormaz

=== November ===
Week of	Tournament	Champions	Runners-up	Semifinalists	Quarterfinalists
November 2	Angola Ladies Open; Luanda, Angola; Hard – $115,000 – 32S/10Q/14D; Singles – Doubles	Sofya Lansere; 5–7, 6–1, 6–4	(France) Anna Blinkova	(Poland) Gina Feistel (Germany) Noma Noha Akugue	(Morocco) Yasmine Kabbaj; Ksenia Zaytseva (Poland) Martyna Kubka (Lithuania) Justina Mikulskytė
November 2	Angola Ladies Open; Luanda, Angola; Hard – $115,000 – 32S/10Q/14D; Singles – Doubles	(Burundi) Sada Nahimana (Kenya) Angella Okutoyi; 6–4, 6–4	(Poland) Martyna Kubka (Lithuania) Justina Mikulskytė	(Poland) Gina Feistel (Germany) Noma Noha Akugue	(Morocco) Yasmine Kabbaj; Ksenia Zaytseva (Poland) Martyna Kubka (Lithuania) Justina Mikulskytė
November 2	Reto Win Tennis Cali Open; Cali, Colombia; Clay – $115,000 – 32S/7Q/8D; Singles – Doubles	(Spain) Leyre Romero Gormaz; 7–6^{(7–4)}, 6–3	(Canada) Bianca Andreescu	(France) Alice Tubello (Argentina) Julia Riera	(France) Léolia Jeanjean (Argentina) Luisina Giovannini (France) Carole Monnet (Mexico) Renata Zarazúa
November 2	Reto Win Tennis Cali Open; Cali, Colombia; Clay – $115,000 – 32S/7Q/8D; Singles – Doubles	(United States) Anna Rogers (United States) Allura Zamarripa; 7–6^{(7–5)}, 7–5	(Argentina) María Lourdes Carlé (Brazil) Laura Pigossi	(France) Alice Tubello (Argentina) Julia Riera	(France) Léolia Jeanjean (Argentina) Luisina Giovannini (France) Carole Monnet (Mexico) Renata Zarazúa
November 9	DIRECTV Open; Sopó, Colombia; Clay – $115,000 – 32S/8Q/8D; Singles – Doubles	(Canada) Bianca Andreescu; 6–3, 6–3	(United States) Elizabeth Mandlik	(Slovenia) Polona Hercog (Czech Republic) Laura Samson	(France) Alice Tubello (Spain) Marina Bassols Ribera (Spain) Irene Burillo (Spain) Andrea Lázaro García
November 9	DIRECTV Open; Sopó, Colombia; Clay – $115,000 – 32S/8Q/8D; Singles – Doubles	(Slovenia) Veronika Erjavec (Kazakhstan) Zhibek Kulambayeva; 5–7, 6–2, [14–12]	(Czech Republic) Laura Samson (Slovenia) Tamara Zidanšek	(Slovenia) Polona Hercog (Czech Republic) Laura Samson	(France) Alice Tubello (Spain) Marina Bassols Ribera (Spain) Irene Burillo (Spain) Andrea Lázaro García
November 16	LP Open by IND; Colina, Chile; Clay – $115,000 – 32S/8Q/8D; Singles – Doubles	(Switzerland) Rebeka Masarova; 6–4, 6–4	(Spain) Leyre Romero Gormaz	(Italy) Lucia Bronzetti (Spain) Guiomar Maristany	(Spain) Irene Burillo (Ukraine) Valeriya Strakhova (Spain) Andrea Lázaro García (Czech Republic) Laura Samson
November 16	LP Open by IND; Colina, Chile; Clay – $115,000 – 32S/8Q/8D; Singles – Doubles	(Slovenia) Veronika Erjavec (Kazakhstan) Zhibek Kulambayeva; 6–4, 6–3	(Ukraine) Valeriya Strakhova; Anastasia Tikhonova	(Italy) Lucia Bronzetti (Spain) Guiomar Maristany	(Spain) Irene Burillo (Ukraine) Valeriya Strakhova (Spain) Andrea Lázaro García (Czech Republic) Laura Samson
November 23	IEB+ Argentina Open; Buenos Aires, Argentina; Clay – $115,000 – 32S/8Q/8D; Singles – Doubles	vs		vs vs	vs vs vs vs
November 23	IEB+ Argentina Open; Buenos Aires, Argentina; Clay – $115,000 – 32S/8Q/8D; Singles – Doubles	/ vs /		vs vs	vs vs vs vs
November 30	Quito Open; Quito, Ecuador; Clay – $115,000 – 32S/8Q/8D; Singles – Doubles	vs		vs vs	vs vs vs vs
November 30	Quito Open; Quito, Ecuador; Clay – $115,000 – 32S/8Q/8D; Singles – Doubles	/ vs /		vs vs	vs vs vs vs
November 30	Open Angers Loire Trélazé; Angers, France; Hard (i) – $115,000 – 32S/8Q/8D; Singles – Doubles	vs		vs vs	vs vs vs vs
November 30	Open Angers Loire Trélazé; Angers, France; Hard (i) – $115,000 – 32S/8Q/8D; Singles – Doubles	/ vs /		vs vs	vs vs vs vs

=== December ===
Week of	Tournament	Champions	Runners-up	Semifinalists	Quarterfinalists
December 14	Open BLS de Limoges; Limoges, France; Hard (i) – $115,000 – 32S/8Q/8D; Singles – Doubles	vs		vs vs	vs vs vs vs
December 14	Open BLS de Limoges; Limoges, France; Hard (i) – $115,000 – 32S/8Q/8D; Singles – Doubles	/ vs /		vs vs	vs vs vs vs

== Cancelled tournaments ==
The following tournaments were formally announced by the WTA before being cancelled.

Week of	Tournament
March 9	Cancún Tennis Open; Cancún, Mexico; Hard
March 23	Puerto Vallarta Open; Puerto Vallarta, Mexico; Hard
October 19	Rio Ladies Open; Rio de Janeiro, Brazil; Clay
November 2	American Tennis Open; Miami, United States; Hard

== Statistical information ==
These tables present the number of singles (S) and doubles (D) titles won by each player and each nation during the season. The players/nations are sorted by: 1) total number of titles (a doubles title won by two players representing the same nation counts as only one win for the nation); 2) a singles > doubles hierarchy; 3) alphabetical order (by family names for players).

To avoid confusion and double counting, these tables should be updated only after an event is completed.

=== Titles won by player ===
Total	Player	S	D	S	D
4	Isabelle Haverlag (NED)		● ● ● ●	0	4
4	Dalila Jakupović (SLO)		● ● ● ●	0	4
4	Maria Kozyreva (Note: As of 1 March 2022, the ATP and WTA announced that players from Russia and Belarus will not compete in tournaments under the name or flag of Russia or Belarus due to the Russian invasion of Ukraine.)		● ● ● ●	0	4
4	Angelica Moratelli (ITA)		● ● ● ●	0	4
4	Elena Pridankina		● ● ● ●	0	4
4	Nika Radišić (SLO)		● ● ● ●	0	4
4	Iryna Shymanovich		● ● ● ●	0	4
3	Bianca Andreescu (CAN)	● ● ●		3	0
3	Maria Timofeeva (UZB)	● ● ●		3	0
3	Liang En-shuo (TPE)	●	● ●	1	2
3	Estelle Cascino (FRA)		● ● ●	0	3
3	Lucija Ćirić Bagarić (CRO)		● ● ●	0	3
3	Veronika Erjavec (SLO)		● ● ●	0	3
3	Nicole Fossa Huergo (ARG)		● ● ●	0	3
3	Zhibek Kulambayeva (KAZ)		● ● ●	0	3
2	Clara Burel (FRA)	● ●		2	0
2	Alina Charaeva (ARM) (Note: Charaeva won her first title as a Russian and the second title under the Armenian flag.)	● ●		2	0
2	Fiona Ferro (FRA)	● ●		2	0
2	Francesca Jones (GBR)	● ●		2	0
2	Anhelina Kalinina (UKR)	● ●		2	0
2	Katarzyna Kawa (POL)	● ●		2	0
2	Lisa Pigato (ITA)	● ●		2	0
2	Leyre Romero Gormaz (ESP)	● ●		2	0
2	Mayar Sherif (EGY)	● ●		2	0
2	Lanlana Tararudee (THA)	● ●		2	0
2	Moyuka Uchijima (JPN)	● ●		2	0
2	Carol Young Suh Lee (USA)	●	●	1	1
2	Dominika Šalková (CZE)	●	●	1	1
2	Katie Volynets (USA)	●	●	1	1
2	Cho I-hsuan (TPE)		● ●	0	2
2	Cho Yi-tsen (TPE)		● ●	0	2
2	Sofia Costoulas (BEL)		● ●	0	2
2	Weronika Falkowska (POL)		● ●	0	2
2	Viktória Hrunčáková (SVK)		● ●	0	2
2	Matilde Jorge (POR)		● ●	0	2
2	Anna Rogers (USA)		● ●	0	2
2	Alana Smith (USA)		● ●	0	2
2	Tang Qianhui (CHN)		● ●	0	2
2	Anastasia Tikhonova		● ●	0	2
2	Simona Waltert (SUI)		● ●	0	2
1	Ayla Aksu (TUR)	●		1	0
1	Paula Badosa (ESP)	●		1	0
1	Berfu Cengiz (TUR)	●		1	0
1	Maja Chwalińska (POL)	●		1	0
1	Samira De Stefano (ITA)	●		1	0
1	Rositsa Dencheva (BUL)	●		1	0
1	Alexandra Eala (PHI)	●		1	0
1	Joanna Garland (TPE)	●		1	0
1	Ariana Geerlings (ESP)	●		1	0
1	Julia Grabher (AUT)	●		1	0
1	Léolia Jeanjean (FRA)	●		1	0
1	Daria Kasatkina (AUS)	●		1	0
1	Alina Korneeva	●		1	0
1	Sinja Kraus (AUT)	●		1	0
1	Ashlyn Krueger (USA)	●		1	0
1	Sofya Lansere	●		1	0
1	Andrea Lázaro García (ESP)	●		1	0
1	Claire Liu (USA)	●		1	0
1	Tatjana Maria (GER)	●		1	0
1	Rebeka Masarova (SUI)	●		1	0
1	Camila Osorio (COL)	●		1	0
1	Diane Parry (FRA)	●		1	0
1	Taylah Preston (AUS)	●		1	0
1	Laura Samson (CZE)	●		1	0
1	Mananchaya Sawangkaew (THA)	●		1	0
1	Alexandra Shubladze	●		1	0
1	Daria Snigur (UKR)	●		1	0
1	Rebecca Šramková (SVK)	●		1	0
1	Alice Tubello (FRA)	●		1	0
1	Darja Vidmanova (CZE)	●		1	0
1	Dayana Yastremska (UKR)	●		1	0
1	Shuko Aoyama (JPN)		●	0	1
1	Emiliana Arango (COL)		●	0	1
1	Alicia Barnett (GBR)		●	0	1
1	Madeleine Brooks (GBR)		●	0	1
1	Irene Burillo (ESP)		●	0	1
1	Yvonne Cavallé Reimers (ESP)		●	0	1
1	Chan Hao-ching (TPE)		●	0	1
1	Eudice Chong (HKG)		●	0	1
1	Freya Christie (GBR)		●	0	1
1	Carmen Corley (USA)		●	0	1
1	Ivana Corley (USA)		●	0	1
1	Gabriella Da Silva-Fick (AUS)		●	0	1
1	Anastasia Dețiuc (CZE)		●	0	1
1	Caroline Dolehide (USA)		●	0	1
1	Feng Shuo (CHN)		●	0	1
1	Talia Gibson (AUS)		●	0	1
1	Ekaterine Gorgodze (GEO)		●	0	1
1	Catherine Harrison (USA)		●	0	1
1	Lucie Havlíčková (CZE)		●	0	1
1	Dalayna Hewitt (USA)		●	0	1
1	Polina Iatcenko		●	0	1
1	Francisca Jorge (POR)		●	0	1
1	Naïma Karamoko (SUI)		●	0	1
1	Miyu Kato (JPN)		●	0	1
1	Gabriela Knutson (CZE)		●	0	1
1	Martyna Kubka (POL)		●	0	1
1	Aneta Kučmová (CZE)		●	0	1
1	Katarína Kužmová (SVK)		●	0	1
1	Aneta Laboutková (CZE)		●	0	1
1	Sofya Lansere		●	0	1
1	Elixane Lechemia (FRA)		●	0	1
1	Lee Ya-hsin (TPE)		●	0	1
1	Li Yu-yun (TPE)		●	0	1
1	Maia Lumsden (GBR)		●	0	1
1	Rasheeda McAdoo (USA)		●	0	1
1	Kristina Mladenovic (FRA)		●	0	1
1	Sada Nahimana (BDI)		●	0	1
1	Angella Okutoyi (KEN)		●	0	1
1	Despina Papamichail (GRE)		●	0	1
1	Laura Pigossi (BRA)		●	0	1
1	Amelia Rajecki (GBR)		●	0	1
1	Lara Salden (BEL)		●	0	1
1	Sabrina Santamaria (USA)		●	0	1
1	Ena Shibahara (JPN)		●	0	1
1	Eden Silva (GBR)		●	0	1
1	Anna Sisková (CZE)		●	0	1
1	Valeriya Strakhova (UKR)		●	0	1
1	Janice Tjen (INA)		●	0	1
1	Alexandra Vagramov (CAN)		●	0	1
1	Vendula Valdmannová (CZE)		●	0	1
1	Ye Qiuyu (CHN)		●	0	1
1	Allura Zamarripa (USA)		●	0	1
1	Zhang Ying (CHN)		●	0	1
1	Tamara Zidanšek (SLO)		●	0	1
1	Anastasia Zolotareva		●	0	1
1	Vera Zvonareva		●	0	1

=== Titles won by nation ===
Total	Nation	S	D
15	United States (USA)	4	11
12	France (FRA)	7	5
9	Czech Republic (CZE)	3	6
9	Chinese Taipei (TPE)	2	7
9	Slovenia (SLO)	0	9
7	Spain (ESP)	5	2
7	Italy (ITA)	3	4
6	Great Britain (GBR)	2	4
6	Poland (POL)	3	3
5	Ukraine (UKR)	4	1
5	Japan (JPN)	2	3
5	China (CHN)	0	5
4	Canada (CAN)	3	1
4	Australia (AUS)	2	2
4	Switzerland (SUI)	1	3
4	Netherlands (NED)	0	4
3	Thailand (THA)	3	0
3	Uzbekistan (UZB)	3	0
3	Slovakia (SVK)	1	2
3	Argentina (ARG)	0	3
3	Belgium (BEL)	0	3
3	Croatia (CRO)	0	3
3	Kazakhstan (KAZ)	0	3
2	Austria (AUT)	2	0
2	Egypt (EGY)	2	0
2	Turkey (TUR)	2	0
2	Colombia (COL)	1	1
2	Portugal (POR)	0	2
1	Armenia (ARM)	1	0
1	Bulgaria (BUL)	1	0
1	Germany (GER)	1	0
1	Philippines (PHI)	1	0
1	Brazil (BRA)	0	1
1	Burundi (BDI)	0	1
1	Georgia (GEO)	0	1
1	Greece (GRE)	0	1
1	Hong Kong (HKG)	0	1
1	Indonesia (INA)	0	1
1	Kenya (KEN)	0	1

== Points distribution ==
Event	W	F	SF	QF	R16	R32	Q	Q2	Q1
Singles	125	81	49	27	15	1	6	4	1
Doubles (16D)	125	81	49	27	1	—N/a	—N/a	—N/a	—N/a
Doubles (8D)	125	81	49	1	—N/a	—N/a	—N/a	—N/a	—N/a

== See also ==
- 2026 WTA Tour
- 2026 ITF Women's World Tennis Tour
- 2026 ATP Challenger Tour
