= 2026 Trophée Clarins =

- Date: 11–17 May
- Edition: 5th
- Category: WTA 125
- Draw: 32S / 8D
- Prize money: €100,000
- Surface: Clay
- Location: Paris, France
- Venue: Lagardère Paris Racing Club

Champions

Singles
- (France) Diane Parry

Doubles
- (Japan) Shuko Aoyama / (Chinese Taipei) Liang En-shuo
- Clarins Open

The 2026 Trophée Clarins was a professional women's tennis tournament played on outdoor clay courts. It was the 5th edition of the tournament and part of the 2026 WTA 125 tournaments. It took place in the middle of Bois de Boulogne in Paris, France between 11 and 17 May 2026.

== Singles entrants ==
=== Seeds ===
| Country | Player | Rank^{1} | Seed |
|---|---|---|---|
| USA | Madison Keys | 19 | 1 |
| CAN | Leylah Fernandez | 23 | 2 |
| AUS | Maya Joint | 34 | 3 |
| USA | Emma Navarro | 35 | 4 |
| CZE | Sára Bejlek | 37 | 5 |
| USA | McCartney Kessler | 50 | 6 |
| UKR | Yuliia Starodubtseva | 57 | 7 |
| GBR | Katie Boulter | 60 | 8 |

- ^{1} Rankings are as of 4 May 2026.

=== Other entrants ===
The following players received a wildcard into the singles main draw:

- (France) Clara Burel
- (France) Fiona Ferro
- (United States) Madison Keys
- (France) Chloé Paquet

The following player received entry using a protected ranking:

- (United States) Sloane Stephens

The following players qualified into the singles main draw:

- Alina Charaeva
- (Germany) Tamara Korpatsch
- (Ukraine) Veronika Podrez
- (Australia) Taylah Preston

=== Withdrawals ===
Before the tournament

- (United States) Hailey Baptiste → replaced by Aliaksandra Sasnovich
- (Hungary) Dalma Gálfi → replaced by (France) Diane Parry
- (France) Elsa Jacquemot → replaced by (France) Tiantsoa Rakotomanga Rajaonah
- (Uzbekistan) Kamilla Rakhimova → replaced by (Serbia) Lola Radivojević
- (United States) Peyton Stearns → replaced by (Japan) Himeno Sakatsume
- (Australia) Ajla Tomljanović → replaced by (Australia) Maddison Inglis
- (Czech Republic) Tereza Valentová → replaced by Alina Korneeva

During the tournament

- (Kazakhstan) Yulia Putintseva (low back injury)

=== Retirement ===
- (United States) Madison Keys (left thigh injury)

== Doubles entrants ==
=== Seeds ===
| Country | Player | Country | Player | Rank | Seed |
|---|---|---|---|---|---|
| UKR | Lyudmyla Kichenok | USA | Desirae Krawczyk | 58 | 1 |
| SVK | Tereza Mihalíková | GBR | Olivia Nicholls | 58 | 2 |

- Rankings as of 4 May 2026.

=== Other entrants ===
The following pair received a wildcard into the doubles main draw:

- (France) Ksenia Efremova / (France) Tiantsoa Rakotomanga Rajaonah

== Champions ==
=== Singles ===
- (France) Diane Parry def. (United States) Madison Keys, 3–6, 3–3 ret.

=== Doubles ===
- (Japan) Shuko Aoyama / (Chinese Taipei) Liang En-shuo def. (Ukraine) Lyudmyla Kichenok / (United States) Desirae Krawczyk 7–6^{(7–5)}, 6–2.
