= 2026 Austin Challenger =

- Date: 9–14 March 2026
- Edition: 2nd
- Category: WTA 125
- Prize money: $115,000
- Surface: Hard
- Location: Austin, United States

Champions

Singles
- (Thailand) Lanlana Tararudee

Doubles
- (Chinese Taipei) Chan Hao-ching / (Japan) Miyu Kato
- Austin Challenger

The 2026 Austin 125 was a professional women's tennis tournament played on outdoor hardcourts. It was the second edition of the tournament and part of the 2026 WTA 125 tournaments. It took place at the Courtyard Racquet Club in Austin, United States between 9 and 14 March 2026.

== Singles main-draw entrants ==
=== Seeds ===
Country	Player	Rank^{1}	Seed
USA	Emma Navarro	24	1
USA	McCartney Kessler	51	2
ARG	Solana Sierra	65	3
BRA	Beatriz Haddad Maia	67	4
USA	Caty McNally	68	5
AUS	Kimberly Birrell	69	6
	Oksana Selekhmeteva	71	7
CRO	Petra Marčinko	72	8

- ^{1} Rankings are as of 2 March 2026.

=== Other entrants ===
The following players received wildcards into the singles main draw:

- (Canada) Bianca Andreescu
- (Spain) Paula Badosa
- (United States) McCartney Kessler
- (United States) Emma Navarro

The following players received entry from the qualifying draw:

- (Australia) Emerson Jones
- (Italy) Lucrezia Stefanini
- (Thailand) Lanlana Tararudee
- Anastasia Zakharova

The following player received entry as a lucky loser

- (Japan) Himeno Sakatsume

=== Withdrawals ===
Before the tournament

- (Colombia) Emiliana Arango → replaced by (Germany) Ella Seidel
- (Czech Republic) Sára Bejlek → replaced by (Uzbekistan) Kamilla Rakhimova
- (Hungary) Anna Bondár → replaced by (Hungary) Dalma Gálfi
- (Italy) Elisabetta Cocciaretto → replaced by (Netherlands) Suzan Lamens
- (France) Varvara Gracheva → replaced by (Czech Republic) Linda Fruhvirtová
- (Australia) Maya Joint → replaced by (China) Yuan Yue
- (United Kingdom) Francesca Jones → replaced by (Australia) Maddison Inglis
- (Czech Republic) Barbora Krejčíková → replaced by (Switzerland) Viktorija Golubic
- (Germany) Tatjana Maria → replaced by (United States) Katie Volynets
- (Kazakhstan) Yulia Putintseva → replaced by (Ukraine) Yuliia Starodubtseva
- (Croatia) Antonia Ružić → replaced by (Croatia) Donna Vekić
- (United States) Peyton Stearns → replaced by (Mexico) Renata Zarazúa
- (Indonesia) Janice Tjen → replaced by (New Zealand) Lulu Sun
- (Australia) Ajla Tomljanović → replaced by (Austria) Sinja Kraus

During the tournament

- (United States) Katie Volynets → replaced by (Japan) Himeno Sakatsume (lucky loser)

== Doubles entrants ==
=== Seeds ===
Country	Player	Country	Player	Rank	Seed
SVK	Tereza Mihalíková	MEX	Giuliana Olmos	68	1
TPE	Chan Hao-ching	JPN	Miyu Kato	83	2

- Rankings as of 2 March 2026.

== Champions ==
=== Singles ===
- (Thailand) Lanlana Tararudee def. (Canada) Bianca Andreescu 6–3, 3–6, 6–3

=== Doubles ===
- (Chinese Taipei) Chan Hao-ching / (Japan) Miyu Kato def. (Netherlands) Isabelle Haverlag / (United States) Sabrina Santamaria 6–2, 6–3
