= 2025 WTA Argentina Open – Singles =

Singles
- 2025 WTA Argentina Open

Final
- Champion: (Hungary) Panna Udvardy
- Runner-up: (United States) Varvara Lepchenko
- Score: 6–3, 7–5

Events
Singles	Doubles
← 2024 ·	WTA Argentine Open	· 2026 →

Mayar Sherif was the defending champion but lost in the semifinals to Varvara Lepchenko.

Panna Udvardy won the title, defeating Lepchenko in the final, 6–3, 7–5.

== Seeds ==
1. (Egypt) Mayar Sherif (semifinals)
2. (France) Léolia Jeanjean (first round)
3. (Hungary) Panna Udvardy (champion)
4. (Ukraine) Oleksandra Oliynykova (second round, retired)
5. (United States) Caroline Dolehide (quarterfinals)
6. (Slovenia) Veronika Erjavec (semifinals)
7. (Argentina) María Lourdes Carlé (second round)
8. (Poland) Maja Chwalińska (second round)

== Draw ==
Key

- Q = Qualifier
- WC = Wild card
- LL = Lucky loser
- Alt = Alternate
- ITF = ITF entry
- PR = Protected ranking
- SR = Special ranking
- SE = Special exempt
- JE = Junior exempt
- JR = Junior Accelerator Programme entrant
- CO = College Accelerator Programme entrant
- NG = Next Gen Accelerator Program entrant
- w/o = Walkover
- r = Retired
- d = Defaulted

=== Finals ===
Semifinals
1	(Egypt) Mayar Sherif	4	4
(United States) Varvara Lepchenko	6	6
3	(Hungary) Panna Udvardy	6	6
6	(Slovenia) Veronika Erjavec	3	3

Final
(United States) Varvara Lepchenko	3	5
3	(Hungary) Panna Udvardy	6	7

=== Top half ===
First round
1	(Egypt) M Sherif	7	7^{9}
(Argentina) J Riera	5	6^{7}
PR	(Italy) M Trevisan	5	3
(Netherlands) E Vedder	7	6
(Greece) D Papamichail	4	6	6
Q	(United States) A Akli	6	4	0
WC	(Argentina) C Vázquez	1	0
5	(United States) C Dolehide	6	6
4	(Ukraine) O Oliynykova	6	6
(Burundi) S Nahimana	4	1
WC	(Peru) L Pérez Alarcón	6	7^{7}
(United States) E Mandlik	4	6^{1}
(United States) V Lepchenko	6	6
(Brazil) L Pigossi	1	2
(Italy) J Pieri	2	0
8	(Poland) M Chwalińska	6	6

Second round
1	(Egypt) M Sherif	6	6
(Netherlands) E Vedder	1	1
(Greece) D Papamichail	2	6^{4}
5	(United States) C Dolehide	6	7^{7}
4	(Ukraine) O Oliynykova	6^{0}	0^{r}
WC	(Peru) L Pérez Alarcón	7^{7}	0
(United States) V Lepchenko	1	7	7^{7}
8	(Poland) M Chwalińska	6	5	6^{3}

Quarterfinals
1	(Egypt) M Sherif	3	6	6
5	(United States) C Dolehide	6	4	4
WC	(Peru) L Pérez Alarcón	4	6^{2}
(United States) V Lepchenko	6	7^{7}

Semifinals
1	(Egypt) M Sherif	4	4
(United States) V Lepchenko	6	6

=== Bottom half ===
First round
7	(Argentina) ML Carlé	6	6
Q	(Serbia) K Jokić	2	1
(Spain) I Burillo	5	0
(Romania) M Bulgaru	7	6
Q	(Spain) S Sorribes Tormo	6	0	7^{9}
Q	(Spain) A Herrero Liñana	4	6	6^{7}
(Brazil) C Alves	0	0
3	(Hungary) P Udvardy	6	6
6	(Slovenia) V Erjavec	6	6
WC	(Argentina) M Bulbarella	0	0
PR	(Slovenia) P Hercog	4	6	1
(Argentina) J Ortenzi	6	3	6
(France) C Monnet	6	2	3
(Czech Republic) L Samson	2	6	6
WC	(Argentina) L Giovannini	3	7	6
2	(France) L Jeanjean	6	5	2

Second round
7	(Argentina) ML Carlé	6^{4}	3
(Romania) M Bulgaru	7^{7}	6
Q	(Spain) S Sorribes Tormo	5	2
3	(Hungary) P Udvardy	7	6
6	(Slovenia) V Erjavec	6	7
(Argentina) J Ortenzi	4	5
(Czech Republic) L Samson	6	7
WC	(Argentina) L Giovannini	2	5

Quarterfinals
(Romania) M Bulgaru	1	2
3	(Hungary) P Udvardy	6	6
6	(Slovenia) V Erjavec	6	6
(Czech Republic) L Samson	4	0

Semifinals
3	(Hungary) P Udvardy	6	6
6	(Slovenia) V Erjavec	3	3
