= 2026 Oeiras Ladies Open =

- Date: 13–19 April
- Edition: 6th
- Category: WTA 125
- Prize money: €195,652
- Surface: Clay / Outdoor
- Location: Oeiras, Portugal

Champions

Singles
- (Poland) Maja Chwalińska

Doubles
- (Slovenia) Veronika Erjavec / (France) Kristina Mladenovic
- Oeiras Ladies Open

The 2026 Oeiras Ladies Open was a professional women's tennis tournament played on outdoor clay courts. It was the sixth edition of the tournament and part of the 2026 WTA 125 tournaments. It took place at the Centro Desportivo Nacional do Jamor in Oeiras, Portugal, between 13 and 19 April 2026.

== Singles entrants ==
=== Seeds ===
Country	Player	Rank	Seed
BRA	Beatriz Haddad Maia	67	1
	Oksana Selekhmeteva	73	2
CRO	Petra Marčinko	77	3
JPN	Moyuka Uchijima	84	4
SUI	Simona Waltert	91	5
SLO	Veronika Erjavec	99	6
EGY	Mayar Sherif	101	7
LAT	Darja Semeņistaja	112	8

- Rankings are as of 6 April 2026.

=== Other entrants ===
The following players received wildcards into the singles main draw:

- (Portugal) Milana Ivantsiv
- (Portugal) Francisca Jorge
- (Portugal) Matilde Jorge
- (France) Kristina Mladenovic

The following player received entry into the singles main draw through a protected ranking:

- (United States) Robin Montgomery

The following players received entry from the qualifying draw:

- (Romania) Elena Ruxandra Bertea
- (Germany) Tessa Johanna Brockmann
- (United States) Carol Young Suh Lee
- (Netherlands) Anouck Vrancken Peeters

=== Withdrawals ===
Before the tournament

- (Colombia) Emiliana Arango → replaced by (Spain) Kaitlin Quevedo
- (Czech Republic) Nikola Bartůňková → replaced by (Serbia) Lola Radivojević
- Alina Korneeva → replaced by (Netherlands) Anouk Koevermans
- (Ukraine) Yuliia Starodubtseva → replaced by (United States) Robin Montgomery
- (Hungary) Panna Udvardy → replaced by (Belgium) Greet Minnen
- (Belgium) Hanne Vandewinkel → replaced by (United States) Whitney Osuigwe
- (Slovenia) Tamara Zidanšek → replaced by (Serbia) Teodora Kostović

== Doubles entrants ==
=== Seeds ===
Country	Player	Country	Player	Rank^{1}	Seed
SLO	Veronika Erjavec	FRA	Kristina Mladenovic	194	1
POR	Francisca Jorge	POR	Matilde Jorge	213	2
TPE	Cho I-hsuan	TPE	Cho Yi-tsen	226	3
SUI	Naïma Karamoko	LAT	Darja Semeņistaja	334	4

- ^{1} Rankings as of 6 April 2026.

=== Other entrants ===
The following team received a wildcard into the doubles main draw:

- (Portugal) Milana Ivantsiv / (Portugal) Angelina Voloshchuk

=== Retirements ===
- (Portugal) Francisca Jorge / (Portugal) Matilde Jorge (abdominal injury to Francisca)

== Champions ==
=== Singles ===
- (Poland) Maja Chwalińska def. (Austria) Sinja Kraus 6–1, 6–3

=== Doubles ===
- (Slovenia) Veronika Erjavec / (France) Kristina Mladenovic def. (Switzerland) Naïma Karamoko / (Latvia) Darja Semeņistaja 6–2, 7–5
