= 2025 WTA Argentina Open – Doubles =

Doubles
- 2025 WTA Argentina Open

Final
- Champions: (Spain) Alicia Herrero Liñana (Brazil) Laura Pigossi
- Runners-up: (Argentina) Nicole Fossa Huergo (Czech Republic) Laura Samson
- Score: 6–2, 7–6^{(7–5)}

Events
Singles	Doubles
← 2024 ·	WTA Argentine Open	· 2026 →

Maja Chwalińska and Katarzyna Kawa were the defending champions but did not participate this year.

Alicia Herrero Liñana and Laura Pigossi won the title, defeating Nicole Fossa Huergo and Laura Samson in the final, 6–2, 7–6^{(7–5)}.

== Seeds ==
1. (Spain) Alicia Herrero Liñana / (Brazil) Laura Pigossi (champions)
2. (Argentina) Nicole Fossa Huergo / (Czech Republic) Laura Samson (final)

== Draw ==
Key

- Q = Qualifier
- WC = Wild card
- LL = Lucky loser
- Alt = Alternate
- ITF = ITF entry
- PR = Protected ranking
- SR = Special ranking
- SE = Special exempt
- JE = Junior exempt
- JR = Junior Accelerator Programme entrant
- CO = College Accelerator Programme entrant
- NG = Next Gen Accelerator Program entrant
- w/o = Walkover
- r = Retired
- d = Defaulted

=== Draw ===
Quarterfinals
1	(Spain) A Herrero Liñana (Brazil) L Pigossi	6	7
(United States) V Lepchenko (France) C Monnet	2	5
(Slovenia) V Erjavec (Hungary) P Udvardy	6	6
(United States) A Akli (India) R Bhatia	1	1
(Argentina) ML Carlé (Greece) D Papamichail	6	6
WC	(Argentina) L Moyano (Argentina) MF Urrutia	4	1
Alt	(Burundi) S Nahimana; A Zolotareva	6^{5}	6	[7]
2	(Argentina) N Fossa Huergo (Czech Republic) L Samson	7^{7}	1	[10]

Semifinals
1	(Spain) A Herrero Liñana (Brazil) L Pigossi	4	6	[12]
(Slovenia) V Erjavec (Hungary) P Udvardy	6	3	[10]
(Argentina) ML Carlé (Greece) D Papamichail
2	(Argentina) N Fossa Huergo (Czech Republic) L Samson	w/o

Final
1	(Spain) A Herrero Liñana (Brazil) L Pigossi	6	7^{7}
2	(Argentina) N Fossa Huergo (Czech Republic) L Samson	2	6^{5}
