= 2026 Cali Open WTA 125 – Doubles =

Doubles
- 2026 Cali Open WTA 125

Final
- Champions: (United States) Anna Rogers (United States) Allura Zamarripa
- Runners-up: (Argentina) María Lourdes (Brazil) Laura Pigossi
- Score: 7–6^{(7–5)} 7–5

Details
- Draw: 8
- Seeds: 2

Events
Singles	Doubles
- Copa Bionaire

Anna Rogers and Allura Zamarripa won the title, defeating María Lourdes Carlé and Laura Pigossi in the final, 7–6^{(7–5)} 7–5.

Ana Candiotto and Pigossi were the reigning champions, but Candiotto chose not to compete this year.

== Seeds ==
1. (Slovenia) Dalila Jakupović / (Slovenia) Nika Radišić (semifinals)
2. (United States) Anna Rogers / (United States) Allura Zamarripa (champions)

== Draw ==
Key

- Q = Qualifier
- WC = Wild card
- LL = Lucky loser
- Alt = Alternate
- ITF = ITF entry
- PR = Protected ranking
- SR = Special ranking
- SE = Special exempt
- JE = Junior exempt
- JR = Junior Accelerator Programme entrant
- CO = College Accelerator Programme entrant
- NG = Next Gen Accelerator Program entrant
- w/o = Walkover
- r = Retired
- d = Defaulted

=== Draw ===
Quarterfinals
1	(Slovenia) D Jakupović (Slovenia) N Radišić	6	6
(Spain) I Burillo (Argentina) J Riera	2	2
(Argentina) ML Carlé (Brazil) L Pigossi	6	6
(Belgium) S Costoulas (Greece) D Papamichail	4	2
(Australia) T McGiffin (Australia) A Osborne	7^{7}	6^{2}	[9]
WC	(Colombia) V Mediorreal Arias (Colombia) MP Pérez García	6^{2}	7^{7}	[11]
(Czech Republic) L Samson (Slovenia) T Zidanšek	6^{9}	4
2	(United States) A Rogers (United States) A Zamarripa	7^{11}	6

Semifinals
1	(Slovenia) D Jakupović (Slovenia) N Radišić	5	7^{7}	[3]
(Argentina) ML Carlé (Brazil) L Pigossi	7	6^{4}	[10]
WC	(Colombia) V Mediorreal Arias (Colombia) MP Pérez García	2	2
2	(United States) A Rogers (United States) A Zamarripa	6	6

Final
(Argentina) ML Carlé (Brazil) L Pigossi	6^{5}	5
2	(United States) A Rogers (United States) A Zamarripa	7^{7}	7
