= 2026 Cali Open WTA 125 =

- Date: 2 – 8 November
- Edition: 11th
- Category: WTA 125
- Draw: 32S/16D
- Prize money: $115,000
- Surface: Clay
- Location: Cali, Colombia
- Venue: Club Campestre de Cali

Champions

Singles
- (Spain) Leyre Romero Gormaz

Doubles
- (United States) Anna Rogers / (United States) Allura Zamarripa
- Copa Bionaire

The 2026 Cali Open, also known as Reto Win Tennis Cali Open, for sponsorship reasons, was a professional women's tennis tournament played on outdoor clay courts. It was the eleventh edition of the tournament and part of the 2026 WTA 125 tournaments. It took place at the Club Campestre in Cali, Colombia between 2 and 8 November 2026.

== Singles main draw entrants ==
=== Seeds ===
Country	Player	Rank^{1}	Seed
FRA	Léolia Jeanjean	90	1
MEX	Renata Zarazúa	95	2
ARG	Solana Sierra	101	3
USA	Elvina Kalieva	111	4
CZE	Laura Samson	116	5
AUT	Julia Grabher	122	6
ESP	Marina Bassols Ribera	125	7
CAN	Bianca Andreescu	129	8

- ^{1} Rankings as of 26 October 2026.

=== Other entrants ===
The following players received wildcards into the singles main draw:

- (Colombia) Yuliana Lizarazo
- (Colombia) Valentina Mediorreal Arias
- (Colombia) María Paulina Pérez García
- (Colombia) María Torres Murcia

The following players received entry from the qualifying draw:

- (Brazil) Carolina Alves
- (Colombia) María Herazo
- (Slovenia) Polona Hercog
- (France) Séléna Janicijevic

The following players received entry as lucky losers:

- (United States) Elizabeth Mandlik
- (United States) Katrina Scott

=== Withdrawals ===
Before the tournament

- (Colombia) Emiliana Arango → replaced by (Brazil) Laura Pigossi
- (Spain) Jéssica Bouzas Maneiro → replaced by (France) Carole Monnet
- (Slovenia) Veronika Erjavec → replaced by (Argentina) Luisina Giovannini
- (France) Fiona Ferro → replaced by (United States) Katrina Scott
- (United Kingdom) Francesca Jones → replaced by (United States) Elizabeth Mandlik
- (Spain) Andrea Lázaro García → replaced by (Spain) Irene Burillo
- (Latvia) Darja Semeņistaja → replaced by (Argentina) María Lourdes Carlé
- (United States) Akasha Urhobo → replaced by (Greece) Despina Papamichail

== Doubles main draw entrants ==
=== Seeds ===
Country	Player	Country	Player	Rank	Seed
SLO	Dalila Jakupović	SLO	Nika Radišić	137	1
USA	Anna Rogers	USA	Allura Zamarripa	171	2

- ^{1} Rankings as of 26 October 2026

=== Other entrants ===
The following pair received a wildcard into the main draw:

- (Colombia) Valentina Mediorreal Arias / (Colombia) María Paulina Pérez García

== Champions ==
=== Singles ===
- (Spain) Leyre Romero Gormaz def. (Canada) Bianca Andreescu 7–6^{(7–4)}, 6–3

=== Doubles ===
- (United States) Anna Rogers / (United States) Allura Zamarripa def. (Argentina) María Lourdes Carlé / (Brazil) Laura Pigossi 7–6^{(7–5)}, 7–5
