= 2026 WTA Argentina Open – Singles =

Singles
- 2026 WTA Argentina Open
- 2025 Champion: (Hungary) Panna Udvardy

Details
- Draw: 32 (4 WC)
- Seeds: 8

Events
Singles	Doubles
- WTA Argentine Open

Panna Udvardy was the reigning champion, but did not participate this year.

== Seeds ==
1. (Argentina) Solana Sierra
2. (Czech Republic) Laura Samson
3. (Spain) Leyre Romero Gormaz
4. (Italy) Lucia Bronzetti
5. (Argentina) Julia Riera
6. (Spain) Guiomar Maristany
7. (Switzerland) Rebeka Masarova
8. (Slovenia) Veronika Erjavec

== Draw ==
Key

- Q = Qualifier
- WC = Wild card
- LL = Lucky loser
- Alt = Alternate
- ITF = ITF entry
- PR = Protected ranking
- SR = Special ranking
- SE = Special exempt
- JE = Junior exempt
- JR = Junior Accelerator Programme entrant
- CO = College Accelerator Programme entrant
- NG = Next Gen Accelerator Program entrant
- w/o = Walkover
- r = Retired
- d = Defaulted

=== Finals ===
Semifinals

Final

=== Top half ===
First round
1	(Argentina) S Sierra
(Andorra) V Jiménez Kasintseva
WC	(Argentina) B Bonardi
(France) C Monnet
(Italy) M Trevisan
(United States) A Akli
Q	(Kazakhstan) Z Kulambayeva
8	(Slovenia) V Erjavec
4	(Italy) L Bronzetti
(Spain) A Herrero Liñana
Q	(Argentina) J Estévez
(Spain) A Geerlings
(Slovenia) P Hercog
(Turkey) İ Öz
(Greece) D Papamichail
5	(Argentina) J Riera

Second round

Quarterfinals

Semifinals

=== Bottom half ===
First round
6	(Spain) G Maristany
WC	(Argentina) LM Cinalli
(Italy) N Brancaccio
A Zolotareva
WC	(Argentina) SA Larraya Guidi
(Argentina) ML Carlé
(Argentina) N Podoroska
3	(Spain) L Romero Gormaz
7	(Switzerland) R Masarova
(Belgium) S Costoulas
(United States) V Lepchenko
Q	(United States) A Rencheli
Q	(Argentina) L Ayala
(Spain) I Burillo
WC	(Argentina) V Bosio
2	(Czech Republic) L Samson

Second round
(Argentina)
(United States)

Quarterfinals

Semifinals

== Qualifying ==
=== Seeds ===
1. (Kazakhstan) Zhibek Kulambayeva (qualified)
2. (Argentina) Lourdes Ayala (qualified)
3. (Argentina) Josefina Estévez (qualified)
4. (United States) Abigail Rencheli (qualified)

=== Qualifiers ===
1. (Kazakhstan) Zhibek Kulambayeva
2. (Argentina) Lourdes Ayala
3. (Argentina) Josefina Estévez
4. (United States) Abigail Rencheli

=== Qualifying draw ===
==== First qualifier ====
Qualifying competition
1	(Kazakhstan) Zhibek Kulambayeva	6	6
WC	(Argentina) Guadalupe Rondinoni	1	0

==== Second qualifier ====
Qualifying competition
2/WC	(Argentina) Lourdes Ayala	6	6
	(Argentina) Marina Bulbarella	2	3

==== Third qualifier ====
Qualifying competition
3	(Argentina) Josefina Estévez	6	6
	(Argentina) Camila Markus	1	0

==== Fourth qualifier ====
Qualifying competition
4	(United States) Abigail Rencheli	6	6
	(Australia) Alexandra Osborne	4	4
