= 2026 WTA Argentina Open =

- Date: 23 – 29 November
- Edition: 6th
- Category: WTA 125
- Prize money: $115,000
- Surface: Clay
- Location: Buenos Aires, Argentina
- Venue: Tenis Club Argentino

2025 Champions

Singles
- (Hungary) Panna Udvardy

Doubles
- (Spain) Alicia Herrero Liñana / (Brazil) Laura Pigossi
- WTA Argentine Open

The 2026 WTA Argentina Open (also known as the IEB+ Argentina Open for sponsorship reasons) is an upcoming professional women's tennis tournament to be played on outdoor clay courts. It will be the sixth edition of the tournament and part of the 2026 WTA 125 tournaments. It will take place at the Tenis Club Argentino in Buenos Aires, Argentina between 23 and 29 November 2026.

== Singles entrants ==
=== Seeds ===
Country	Player	Rank^{1}	Seed
ARG	Solana Sierra	105	1
CZE	Laura Samson	107	2
ESP	Leyre Romero Gormaz	111	3
ITA	Lucia Bronzetti	135	4
ARG	Julia Riera	137	5
ESP	Guiomar Maristany	158	6
SUI	Rebeka Masarova	160	7
SLO	Veronika Erjavec	161	8

- ^{1} Rankings are as of 16 November 2026.

=== Other entrants ===
The following players received wildcards into the singles main draw:

- (Argentina) Berta Bonardi
- (Argentina) Victoria Bosio
- (Argentina) Luna María Cinalli
- (Argentina) Sol Ailin Larraya Guidi

The following players received entry from the qualifying draw:

- (Argentina) Lourdes Ayala
- (Argentina) Josefina Estévez
- (Kazakhstan) Zhibek Kulambayeva
- (United States) Abigail Rencheli

=== Withdrawals ===
Before the tournament

- (Armenia) Elina Avanesyan → replaced by (France) Carole Monnet
- (Argentina) Luisina Giovannini → replaced by (Spain) Ariana Geerlings
- (Poland) Magda Linette → replaced by (Argentina) María Lourdes Carlé
- (Croatia) Petra Marčinko → replaced by (Spain) Alicia Herrero Liñana
- (Argentina) Jazmín Ortenzi → replaced by (United States) Ayana Akli

== Doubles entrants ==
=== Seeds ===
Country	Player	Country	Player	Rank^{1}	Seed
BEL	Sofia Costoulas	GRE	Despina Papamichail	313	1
AUS	Tenika McGiffin	AUS	Alexandra Osborne	317	2

- ^{1} Rankings as of 16 November 2026.

=== Other entrants ===
The following pair received a wildcard into the doubles main draw:

- (Argentina) / (Argentina)
