= 2026 Oeiras Ladies Open – Singles =

Singles
- 2026 Oeiras Ladies Open

Final
- Champion: (Poland) Maja Chwalińska
- Runner-up: (Austria) Sinja Kraus
- Score: 6–1, 6–3

Events
Singles	Doubles
- Oeiras Ladies Open

Dalma Gálfi was the reigning champion, but did not participate this year.

Maja Chwalińska won the title, defeating Sinja Kraus 6–1, 6–3 in the final.

== Seeds ==
1. (Brazil) Beatriz Haddad Maia (second round)
2. Oksana Selekhmeteva (first round)
3. (Croatia) Petra Marčinko (semifinals)
4. (Japan) Moyuka Uchijima (first round)
5. (Switzerland) Simona Waltert (quarterfinals)
6. (Slovenia) Veronika Erjavec (second round)
7. (Egypt) Mayar Sherif (first round)
8. (Latvia) Darja Semeņistaja (quarterfinals)

== Draw ==
Key

- Q = Qualifier
- WC = Wild card
- LL = Lucky loser
- Alt = Alternate
- ITF = ITF entry
- PR = Protected ranking
- SR = Special ranking
- SE = Special exempt
- JE = Junior exempt
- JR = Junior Accelerator Programme entrant
- CO = College Accelerator Programme entrant
- NG = Next Gen Accelerator Program entrant
- w/o = Walkover
- r = Retired
- d = Defaulted

=== Finals ===
Semifinals
(Poland) Maja Chwalińska	6	6
(United States) Robin Montgomery	2	0
3	(Croatia) Petra Marčinko	4	6	4
(Austria) Sinja Kraus	6	1	6

Final
(Poland) Maja Chwalińska	6	6
(Austria) Sinja Kraus	1	3

=== Top half ===
First round
1	(Brazil) B Haddad Maia	6	7^{7}
WC	(Portugal) F Jorge	4	6^{3}
(Poland) M Chwalińska	3	6	6
(Spain) K Quevedo	6	2	4
(Switzerland) R Masarova	6	6
Q	(Romania) ER Bertea	3	2
(Poland) K Kawa	1	1
5	(Switzerland) S Waltert	6	6
4	(Japan) M Uchijima	4	4
Q	(United States) CYS Lee	6	6
(Netherlands) S Lamens	6	7^{7}
(Serbia) T Kostović	1	6^{5}
(Netherlands) A Koevermans	6	7
WC	(Portugal) M Jorge	1	5
(United States) R Montgomery	3	7	7^{9}
7	(Egypt) M Sherif	6	5	6^{7}

Second round
1	(Brazil) B Haddad Maia	0	4
(Poland) M Chwalińska	6	6
(Switzerland) R Masarova	3	6	2
5	(Switzerland) S Waltert	6	4	6
Q	(United States) CYS Lee	6^{4}	3
(Netherlands) S Lamens	7^{7}	6
(Netherlands) A Koevermans	4	6^{7}
(United States) R Montgomery	6	7^{9}

Quarterfinals
(Poland) M Chwalińska	6	6
5	(Switzerland) S Waltert	1	0
(Netherlands) S Lamens	4	6	4
(United States) R Montgomery	6	3	6

Semifinals
(Poland) M Chwalińska	6	6
(United States) R Montgomery	2	0

=== Bottom half ===
First round
6	(Slovenia) V Erjavec	6	6
WC	(Portugal) M Ivantsiv	0	0
(Serbia) L Radivojević	6	4	3
(Slovakia) R Šramková	2	6	6
(Belgium) G Minnen	6	6
Q	(Netherlands) A Vrancken Peeters	3	2
(Italy) N Brancaccio	5	1
3	(Croatia) P Marčinko	7	6
8	(Latvia) D Semeņistaja	3	6	6
(France) L Jeanjean	6	4	4
Q	(Germany) T Brockmann	6	6
WC	(France) K Mladenovic	2	2
(United States) W Osuigwe	2	6	6
(Czech Republic) D Vidmanová	6	4	2
(Austria) S Kraus	6	4	6
2	O Selekhmeteva	4	6	3

Second round
6	(Slovenia) V Erjavec	5	1
(Slovakia) R Šramková	7	6
(Belgium) G Minnen	2	4
3	(Croatia) P Marčinko	6	6
8	(Latvia) D Semeņistaja	6	6
Q	(Germany) T Brockmann	4	3
(United States) W Osuigwe	6	3	1
(Austria) S Kraus	2	6	6

Quarterfinals
(Slovakia) R Šramková	6^{4}	7	3
3	(Croatia) P Marčinko	7^{7}	5	6
8	(Latvia) D Semeņistaja	3	2
(Austria) S Kraus	6	6

Semifinals
3	(Croatia) P Marčinko	4	6	4
(Austria) S Kraus	6	1	6

== Qualifying ==
=== Seeds ===
1. (Georgia (country)) Ekaterine Gorgodze (qualifying competition, retired)
2. (United States) Carol Young Suh Lee (qualified)
3. (Switzerland) Jil Teichmann (qualifying competition)
4. (Czech Republic) Barbora Palicová (first round)
5. (Germany) Caroline Werner (first round)
6. (Serbia) Mia Ristić (qualifying competition)
7. (Germany) Tessa Brockmann (qualified)
8. Alisa Oktiabreva (first round)

=== Qualifiers ===
1. (Romania) Elena Ruxandra Bertea
2. (United States) Carol Young Suh Lee
3. (Netherlands) Anouck Vrancken Peeters
4. (Germany) Tessa Brockmann

=== Qualifying draw ===
==== First qualifier ====
First round
1	(Georgia (country)) Ekaterine Gorgodze	6	6
(Portugal) Angelina Voloshchuk	2	4
(Romania) Elena Ruxandra Bertea	7^{12}	2	6
8	Alisa Oktiabreva	6^{10}	6	4

Qualifying competition
1	(Georgia (country)) Ekaterine Gorgodze	5^{r}
(Romania) Elena Ruxandra Bertea	6

==== Second qualifier ====
First round
2	(United States) Carol Young Suh Lee	6	6
WC	(Portugal) Gabriela Agra Amorim	1	2
(Croatia) Lea Bošković	2	3
6	(Serbia) Mia Ristić	6	6

Qualifying competition
2	(United States) Carol Young Suh Lee	7^{7}	7
6	(Serbia) Mia Ristić	6^{4}	5

==== Third qualifier ====
First round
3	(Switzerland) Jil Teichmann	6	6
(Hungary) Amarissa Tóth	2	4
(Netherlands) Anouck Vrancken Peeters	7	7
5	(Germany) Caroline Werner	5	5

Qualifying competition
3	(Switzerland) Jil Teichmann	4	4
(Netherlands) Anouck Vrancken Peeters	6	6

==== Fourth qualifier ====
First round
4	(Czech Republic) Barbora Palicová	2	6	3
(Romania) Gabriela Lee	6	0	6
WC	(Portugal) Analu Freitas	0	0
7	(Germany) Tessa Brockmann	6	6

Qualifying competition
(Romania) Gabriela Lee	2	5
7	(Germany) Tessa Brockmann	6	7
