= 2026 Philippine Women's Open – Doubles =

Doubles
- 2026 Philippine Women's Open

Final
- Champions: (Hong Kong) Eudice Chong (Chinese Taipei) Liang En-shuo
- Runners-up: (United States) Quinn Gleason (United States) Sabrina Santamaria
- Score: 2–6, 7–6^{(7–2)}, [10–6]

Events
Singles	Doubles
- Philippine Women's Open

Eudice Chong and Liang En-shuo won the title, defeating Quinn Gleason and Sabrina Santamaria 2–6, 7–6^{(7–2)}, [10–6] in the final.

This was the first edition of the tournament.

== Seeds ==
1. (United States) Quinn Gleason / (United States) Sabrina Santamaria (final)
2. (Hong Kong) Eudice Chong / (Chinese Taipei) Liang En-shuo (champions)
3. (Chinese Taipei) Cho I-hsuan / (Chinese Taipei) Cho Yi-tsen (semifinals)
4. (Argentina) Nicole Fossa Huergo / (Latvia) Darja Semeņistaja (quarterfinals)

== Draw ==
Key

- Q = Qualifier
- WC = Wild card
- LL = Lucky loser
- Alt = Alternate
- ITF = ITF entry
- PR = Protected ranking
- SR = Special ranking
- SE = Special exempt
- JE = Junior exempt
- JR = Junior Accelerator Programme entrant
- CO = College Accelerator Programme entrant
- NG = Next Gen Accelerator Program entrant
- w/o = Walkover
- r = Retired
- d = Defaulted

=== Draw ===
First round
(Japan) H Kuwata (China) Q Ye	6	6
WC	(Philippines) E Abarquez (Philippines) R Baulete	0	2
4	(Argentina) N Fossa Huergo (Latvia) D Semeņistaja	6	6
WC	(Philippines) KA Emana (Philippines) JH Maneja	2	2
WC	(Philippines) A Alcala (Philippines) JV Peña	0	1
(Chinese Taipei) Y-y Li (Japan) S Saito	6	6
(China) Y Ma (Thailand) M Sawangkaew	6	7^{7}
(Thailand) T Naklo (Thailand) P Plipuech	1	6^{5}
(Argentina) S Sierra (China) L Zhu	2	6	[4]
3	(Chinese Taipei) I-h Cho (Chinese Taipei) Y-t Cho	6	3	[10]
(Japan) M Ayukawa (Japan) K Morisaki	6	6
WC	(Philippines) SM Aludo (Philippines) T Madis	2	2

Quarterfinals
1	(United States) Q Gleason (United States) S Santamaria	6	7
(Japan) H Kuwata (China) Q Ye	4	5
4	(Argentina) N Fossa Huergo (Latvia) D Semeņistaja	5	6	[10]
(Chinese Taipei) Y-y Li (Japan) S Saito	7	1	[12]
(China) Y Ma (Thailand) M Sawangkaew	3	4
3	(Chinese Taipei) I-h Cho (Chinese Taipei) Y-t Cho	6	6
(Japan) M Ayukawa (Japan) K Morisaki	4	2
2	(Hong Kong) E Chong (Chinese Taipei) E-s Liang	6	6

Semifinals
1	(United States) Q Gleason (United States) S Santamaria	6	6
(Chinese Taipei) Y-y Li (Japan) S Saito	2	3
3	(Chinese Taipei) I-h Cho (Chinese Taipei) Y-t Cho	3	3
2	(Hong Kong) E Chong (Chinese Taipei) E-s Liang	6	6

Final
1	(United States) Q Gleason (United States) S Santamaria	6	6^{2}	[6]
2	(Hong Kong) E Chong (Chinese Taipei) E-s Liang	2	7^{7}	[10]
