= 2026 Oeiras Ladies Open – Doubles =

Doubles
- 2026 Oeiras Ladies Open

Final
- Champions: (Slovenia) Veronika Erjavec (France) Kristina Mladenovic
- Runners-up: (Switzerland) Naïma Karamoko (Latvia) Darja Semeņistaja
- Score: 6–2, 7–5

Events
Singles	Doubles
- Oeiras Ladies Open

Francisca and Matilde Jorge were the defending champions, but they retired from their quarterfinal match against Tessa Brockmann and Mia Ristić.

Veronika Erjavec and Kristina Mladenovic won the title, defeating Naïma Karamoko and Darja Semeņistaja 6–2, 7–5 in the final.

== Seeds ==
1. (Slovenia) Veronika Erjavec / (France) Kristina Mladenovic (champions)
2. (Portugal) Francisca Jorge / (Portugal) Matilde Jorge (quarterfinals, retired)
3. (Chinese Taipei) Cho I-hsuan / (Chinese Taipei) Cho Yi-tsen (semifinals)
4. (Switzerland) Naïma Karamoko / (Latvia) Darja Semeņistaja (final)

== Draw ==
Key

- Q = Qualifier
- WC = Wild card
- LL = Lucky loser
- Alt = Alternate
- ITF = ITF entry
- PR = Protected ranking
- SR = Special ranking
- SE = Special exempt
- JE = Junior exempt
- JR = Junior Accelerator Programme entrant
- CO = College Accelerator Programme entrant
- NG = Next Gen Accelerator Program entrant
- w/o = Walkover
- r = Retired
- d = Defaulted

=== Draw ===
First round
1	(Slovenia) V Erjavec (France) K Mladenovic	6	6
(United States) R Montgomery (United States) W Osuigwe	3	2
(Czech Republic) M Bayerlová (Australia) T McGiffin	3	3
(India) R Bhosale (Japan) M Uchijima	6	6
3	(Chinese Taipei) I-h Cho (Chinese Taipei) Y-t Cho	6	6
(United States) CYS Lee (India) A Raina	3	4
(Italy) N Brancaccio (Georgia (country)) E Gorgodze	6	6
(United States) K Allen (Mexico) S León	2	4
(Austria) S Kraus (Switzerland) J Teichmann	4	5
(Serbia) T Kostović; E Pridankina	6	7
(Spain) K Quevedo (Serbia) L Radivojević	4	3
4	(Switzerland) N Karamoko (Latvia) D Semeņistaja	6	6
WC	(Portugal) M Ivantsiv (Portugal) A Voloshchuk	2	2
(Germany) T Brockmann (Serbia) M Ristić	6	6
(Romania) I Bara (Brazil) I Martins	4	3
2	(Portugal) F Jorge (Portugal) M Jorge	6	6

Quarterfinals
1	(Slovenia) V Erjavec (France) K Mladenovic	5	6	[10]
(India) R Bhosale (Japan) M Uchijima	7	4	[8]
3	(Chinese Taipei) I-h Cho (Chinese Taipei) Y-t Cho	6	6
(Italy) N Brancaccio (Georgia (country)) E Gorgodze	1	1
(Serbia) T Kostović; E Pridankina	6	2	[1]
4	(Switzerland) N Karamoko (Latvia) D Semeņistaja	3	6	[10]
(Germany) T Brockmann (Serbia) M Ristić	3
2	(Portugal) F Jorge (Portugal) M Jorge	1^{r}

Semifinals
1	(Slovenia) V Erjavec (France) K Mladenovic	6	6
3	(Chinese Taipei) I-h Cho (Chinese Taipei) Y-t Cho	3	3
4	(Switzerland) N Karamoko (Latvia) D Semeņistaja	6	6
(Germany) T Brockmann (Serbia) M Ristić	4	1

Final
1	(Slovenia) V Erjavec (France) K Mladenovic	6	7
4	(Switzerland) N Karamoko (Latvia) D Semeņistaja	2	5
