= 2026 Trophée Clarins – Singles =

Tennis tournament

Singles
- 2026 Trophée Clarins

Final
- Champion: (France) Diane Parry
- Runner-up: (United States) Madison Keys
- Score: 3–6, 3–3 ret.

Details
- Draw: 32 (4 WC)
- Seeds: 8

Events
Singles	Doubles
- Clarins Open

Diane Parry won the singles title at the 2026 Trophée Clarins after Madison Keys retired in the final due to a thigh injury while leading 6–3, 3–3.

Katie Boulter was the defending champion, but lost in the second round to Anastasia Zakharova.

== Seeds ==
1. (United States) Madison Keys (final, retired)
2. (Canada) Leylah Fernandez (first round)
3. (Australia) Maya Joint (first round)
4. (United States) Emma Navarro (second round)
5. (Czech Republic) Sára Bejlek (first round)
6. (United States) McCartney Kessler (first round)
7. (Ukraine) Yuliia Starodubtseva (semifinals)
8. (United Kingdom) Katie Boulter (second round)

== Draw ==
Key

- Q = Qualifier
- WC = Wild card
- LL = Lucky loser
- Alt = Alternate
- ITF = ITF entry
- PR = Protected ranking
- SR = Special ranking
- SE = Special exempt
- JE = Junior exempt
- JR = Junior Accelerator Programme entrant
- CO = College Accelerator Programme entrant
- NG = Next Gen Accelerator Program entrant
- w/o = Walkover
- r = Retired
- d = Defaulted

=== Finals ===
Semifinals
1/WC	(United States) Madison Keys	1	6	6
7	(Ukraine) Yuliia Starodubtseva	6	2	3
(France) Diane Parry	7^{8}	7^{8}
Q	Alina Charaeva	6^{6}	6^{6}

Final
1/WC	(United States) Madison Keys	6	3^{r}
(France) Diane Parry	3	3

=== Top half ===
First round
1/WC	(United States) M Keys	6	6
WC	(France) F Ferro	4	2
(Mexico) R Zarazúa	4	6	4
(France) T Rakotomanga Rajaonah	6	2	6
(Australia) M Inglis	2	2
A Zakharova	6	6
(Australia) K Birrell	5	6^{2}
8	(United Kingdom) K Boulter	7	7^{7}
4	(United States) E Navarro	6	7^{7}
(Serbia) L Radivojević	2	6^{4}
A Korneeva	1	4
(United States) K Volynets	6	6
(China) S Zhang	4	6	6
(Japan) H Sakatsume	6	2	1
Q	(Australia) T Preston	4	4
7	(Ukraine) Y Starodubtseva	6	6

Second round
1/WC	(United States) M Keys	6	6
(France) T Rakotomanga Rajaonah	4	1
A Zakharova	6	3	6
8	(United Kingdom) K Boulter	3	6	4
4	(United States) E Navarro	3	2
(United States) K Volynets	6	6
(China) S Zhang	2	1
7	(Ukraine) Y Starodubtseva	6	6

Quarterfinals
1/WC	(United States) M Keys	6	6
A Zakharova	4	1
(United States) K Volynets	5	6	2
7	(Ukraine) Y Starodubtseva	7	2	6

Semifinals
1/WC	(United States) M Keys	1	6	6
7	(Ukraine) Y Starodubtseva	6	2	3

=== Bottom half ===
First round
6	(United States) M Kessler	1	1
(Kazakhstan) Y Putintseva	6	6
Q	(Ukraine) V Podrez	4	6	6
PR	(United States) S Stephens	6	3	2
(Brazil) B Haddad Maia	3	2
(France) D Parry	6	6
WC	(France) C Paquet	5	6	6
3	(Australia) M Joint	7	0	3
5	(Czech Republic) S Bejlek	4	0
Q	A Charaeva	6	6
WC	(France) C Burel	6	6^{5}	4
Q	(Germany) T Korpatsch	4	7^{7}	6
(Australia) T Gibson	4	0
A Sasnovich	6	6
A Blinkova	7^{7}	6
2	(Canada) L Fernandez	6^{4}	4

Second round
(Kazakhstan) Y Putintseva	6	6
Q	(Ukraine) V Podrez	4	0
(France) D Parry	6	3	6
WC	(France) C Paquet	4	6	4
Q	A Charaeva	6	6^{3}	7
Q	(Germany) T Korpatsch	4	7^{7}	5
A Sasnovich	7	6
A Blinkova	5	4

Quarterfinals
(Kazakhstan) Y Putintseva
(France) D Parry	w/o
Q	A Charaeva	6	6
A Sasnovich	4	0

Semifinals
(France) D Parry	7^{8}	7^{8}
Q	A Charaeva	6^{6}	6^{6}

== Qualifying ==
=== Seeds ===
1. (Germany) Tamara Korpatsch (qualified)
2. Alina Charaeva (qualified)
3. (Australia) Taylah Preston (qualified)
4. (Ukraine) Veronika Podrez (qualified)

=== Qualifiers ===
1. (Germany) Tamara Korpatsch
2. Alina Charaeva
3. (Australia) Taylah Preston
4. (Ukraine) Veronika Podrez

=== Qualifying draw ===
==== First qualifier ====
Qualifying competition
1	(Germany) Tamara Korpatsch	3	7	6
WC	(France) Ksenia Efremova	6	5	2

==== Second qualifier ====
Qualifying competition
2	Alina Charaeva	6	6
	(France) Alice Tubello	3	4

==== Third qualifier ====
Qualifying competition
3	(Australia) Taylah Preston	6	6
WC	(France) Hajar Crinebouch	0	1

==== Fourth qualifier ====
Qualifying competition
4	(Ukraine) Veronika Podrez	7	6
	(China) Guo Hanyu	5	1
