= 2026 Trophée Clarins – Doubles =

Doubles
- 2026 Trophée Clarins

Final
- Champions: (Japan) Shuko Aoyama (Chinese Taipei) Liang En-shuo
- Runners-up: (Ukraine) Lyudmyla Kichenok (United States) Desirae Krawczyk
- Score: 7–6^{(7–5)}, 6–2

Events
Singles	Doubles
- Clarins Open

Irina Khromacheva and Fanny Stollár were the reigning champions, but chose not to participate as they were still playing in Rome.

Shuko Aoyama and Liang En-shuo won the title, defeating Lyudmyla Kichenok and Desirae Krawczyk 7–6^{(7–5)}, 6–2 in the final.

== Seeds ==
1. (Ukraine) Lyudmyla Kichenok / (United States) Desirae Krawczyk (final)
2. (Slovakia) Tereza Mihalíková / (United Kingdom) Olivia Nicholls (semifinals)

== Draw ==
Key

- Q = Qualifier
- WC = Wild card
- LL = Lucky loser
- Alt = Alternate
- ITF = ITF entry
- PR = Protected ranking
- SR = Special ranking
- SE = Special exempt
- JE = Junior exempt
- JR = Junior Accelerator Programme entrant
- CO = College Accelerator Programme entrant
- NG = Next Gen Accelerator Program entrant
- w/o = Walkover
- r = Retired
- d = Defaulted

=== Draw ===
Quarterfinals
1	(Ukraine) L Kichenok (United States) D Krawczyk	1	7^{7}	[10]
(China) H Guo (France) K Mladenovic	6	6^{4}	[7]
(Norway) U Eikeri (Japan) M Kato	2	6^{5}
(China) X Jiang (China) Y Xu	6	7^{7}
(Japan) S Aoyama (Chinese Taipei) E-s Liang	4	6	[10]
WC	(France) K Efremova (France) T Rakotomanga Rajaonah	6	1	[6]
(Japan) E Hozumi (Chinese Taipei) F-h Wu	1	2
2	(Slovakia) T Mihalíková (United Kingdom) O Nicholls	6	6

Semifinals
1	(Ukraine) L Kichenok (United States) D Krawczyk	6	6
(China) X Jiang (China) Y Xu	4	3
(Japan) S Aoyama (Chinese Taipei) E-s Liang	6	3	[10]
2	(Slovakia) T Mihalíková (United Kingdom) O Nicholls	1	6	[8]

Final
1	(Ukraine) L Kichenok (United States) D Krawczyk	6^{5}	2
(Japan) S Aoyama (Chinese Taipei) E-s Liang	7^{7}	6
