= María de Lourdes =

María de Lourdes is a Spanish feminine given name taken from Our Lady of Lourdes a title of the Virgin Mary

Those with the name include:

- María de Lourdes (singer) (1939-1997)
- Maria de Lourdes Abadia (born 1944), Brazilian politician
- María de Lourdes Alcívar (born 1963), First Lady of Ecuador
- María de Lourdes Amaya (born 1980) is a Mexican politician affiliated to the PRD
- María de Lourdes Dieck-Assad, Mexican economist
- María de Lourdes Santiago a lawyer and journalist from Adjuntas, Puerto Rico
- María de Lourdes Ramos Rivera (born 1960) Puerto Rican politician
- Maria de Lourdes Belchior Pontes (1923-1998) was a Portuguese writer, poet, professor and diplomat
- Maria de Lourdes Levy (1921–2015), Portuguese physician
- Maria de Lourdes Martins (1926–2009) was a Portuguese pianist and composer
- Maria de Lourdes Pintasilgo (1930–2004), Portuguese politician
- Maria de Lourdes Sá Teixeira (1907–1984), Portuguese aviator
- María de Lourdes Santiago (born 1968), Puerto Rican politician
- Maria de Lourdes Teixeira (1907–1989) was a Brazilian writer, translator, biographer and journalist who died in a car accident

== María Lourdes ==
- María Lourdes Ramírez Martín (born 1979) is a Spanish politician
- María Lourdes Carlé (born 2000) is a Spanish tennis player
- María Lourdes Afiuni, Venezuelan judge
- María Lourdes Ruiz, Nicaraguan athlete
- María Lourdes Caldera, Venezuelan model
- Maria Lourdes Sereno, Philippines judge
