= 2026 Austin Challenger – Singles =

Singles
- 2026 Austin Challenger

Final
- Champion: (Thailand) Lanlana Tararudee
- Runner-up: (Canada) Bianca Andreescu
- Score: 6–3, 3–6, 6–3

Events
Singles	Doubles
- Austin Challenger

Renata Zarazúa was the defending champion, but lost in the second round to Bianca Andreescu.

Lanlana Tararudee won the title, defeating Andreescu 6–3, 3–6, 6–3 in the final.

== Seeds ==
1. (United States) Emma Navarro (first round)
2. (United States) McCartney Kessler (quarterfinals)
3. (Argentina) Solana Sierra (first round)
4. (Brazil) Beatriz Haddad Maia (first round)
5. (United States) Caty McNally (second round)
6. (Australia) Kimberly Birrell (semifinals)
7. Oksana Selekhmeteva (second round)
8. (Croatia) Petra Marčinko (first round)

== Draw ==
Key

- Q = Qualifier
- WC = Wild card
- LL = Lucky loser
- Alt = Alternate
- ITF = ITF entry
- PR = Protected ranking
- SR = Special ranking
- SE = Special exempt
- JE = Junior exempt
- JR = Junior Accelerator Programme entrant
- CO = College Accelerator Programme entrant
- NG = Next Gen Accelerator Program entrant
- w/o = Walkover
- r = Retired
- d = Defaulted

=== Finals ===
Semifinals
WC	(Spain) Paula Badosa	2	6	3
WC	(Canada) Bianca Andreescu	6	3	6
Q	(Thailand) Lanlana Tararudee	6	7^{7}
6	(Australia) Kimberly Birrell	4	6^{4}

Final
WC	(Canada) Bianca Andreescu	3	6	3
Q	(Thailand) Lanlana Tararudee	6	3	6

=== Top half ===
First round
1/WC	(United States) E Navarro	4	4
(New Zealand) L Sun	6	6
WC	(Spain) P Badosa	2	6	7
(Romania) E-G Ruse	6	2	5
Q	(Italy) L Stefanini	3	4
(Austria) S Kraus	6	6
(China) Y Yuan	4	3
7	O Selekhmeteva	6	6
3	(Argentina) S Sierra	3	6	3
WC	(Canada) B Andreescu	6	2	6
(Mexico) R Zarazúa	6	6^{4}	6
A Blinkova	3	7^{7}	4
(Australia) M Inglis	4	1
Q	(Australia) E Jones	6	6
(Croatia) D Vekić	6	6
8	(Croatia) P Marčinko	3	4

Second round
(New Zealand) L Sun	1	6^{6}
WC	(Spain) P Badosa	6	7^{8}
(Austria) S Kraus	6	1	6
7	O Selekhmeteva	2	6	4
WC	(Canada) B Andreescu	6	7
(Mexico) R Zarazúa	3	5
Q	(Australia) E Jones	6	7^{7}
(Croatia) D Vekić	3	6^{4}

Quarterfinals
WC	(Spain) P Badosa	7	6
(Austria) S Kraus	5	1
WC	(Canada) B Andreescu	6	3	6
Q	(Australia) E Jones	4	6	3

Semifinals
WC	(Spain) P Badosa	2	6	3
WC	(Canada) B Andreescu	6	3	6

=== Bottom half ===
First round
5	(United States) C McNally	7	4	6
(Ukraine) Y Starodubtseva	5	6	4
(Hungary) D Gálfi	4	6^{5}
Q	(Thailand) L Tararudee	6	7^{7}
Q	A Zakharova	7	7
(Switzerland) V Golubic	5	5
(Czech Republic) L Fruhvirtová	6	6^{4}	6
4	(Brazil) B Haddad Maia	3	7^{7}	4
6	(Australia) K Birrell	7^{9}	6
(Germany) E Seidel	6^{7}	1
(Netherlands) S Lamens	7	1	4
(Uzbekistan) K Rakhimova	5	6	6
LL	(Japan) H Sakatsume	4	4
(Slovenia) K Juvan	6	6
(Switzerland) S Waltert	6^{6}	3
2/WC	(United States) M Kessler	7^{8}	6

Second round
5	(United States) C McNally	3	6	3
Q	(Thailand) L Tararudee	6	4	6
Q	A Zakharova	6	6
(Czech Republic) L Fruhvirtová	0	2
6	(Australia) K Birrell	6	1	6
(Uzbekistan) K Rakhimova	2	6	2
(Slovenia) K Juvan	7	4	2
2/WC	(United States) M Kessler	5	6	6

Quarterfinals
Q	(Thailand) L Tararudee	6	6
Q	A Zakharova	3	4
6	(Australia) K Birrell	6^{3}	7^{7}	6
2/WC	(United States) M Kessler	7^{7}	6^{3}	0

Semifinals
Q	(Thailand) L Tararudee	6	7^{7}
6	(Australia) K Birrell	4	6^{4}

== Qualifying ==
=== Seeds ===
1. Anastasia Zakharova (qualified)
2. (France) Léolia Jeanjean (qualifying competition)
3. (Thailand) Lanlana Tararudee (qualified)
4. (Japan) Himeno Sakatsume (qualifying competition, lucky loser)

=== Qualifiers ===
1. Anastasia Zakharova
2. (Italy) Lucrezia Stefanini
3. (Thailand) Lanlana Tararudee
4. (Australia) Emerson Jones

=== Lucky loser ===
1. (Japan) Himeno Sakatsume

=== Qualifying draw ===
==== First qualifier ====
Qualifying competition
1	Anastasia Zakharova	6	6
WC	(United States) Sloane Stephens	0	1

==== Second qualifier ====
Qualifying competition
2	(France) Léolia Jeanjean	7^{7}	4	5
	(Italy) Lucrezia Stefanini	6^{0}	6	7

==== Third qualifier ====
Qualifying competition
3	(Thailand) Lanlana Tararudee	6	6
WC	(United States) Malaika Rapolu	1	1

==== Fourth qualifier ====
Qualifying competition
4	(Japan) Himeno Sakatsume	6	2	3
	(Australia) Emerson Jones	3	6	6
