= 2026 Philippine Women's Open – Singles =

Singles
- 2026 Philippine Women's Open

Final
- Champion: (Colombia) Camila Osorio
- Runner-up: (Croatia) Donna Vekić
- Score: 2–6, 6–3, 7–5

Events
Singles	Doubles
- Philippine Women's Open

This was the first edition of the tournament.

Camila Osorio won the title, defeating Donna Vekić 2–6, 6–3, 7–5 in the final.

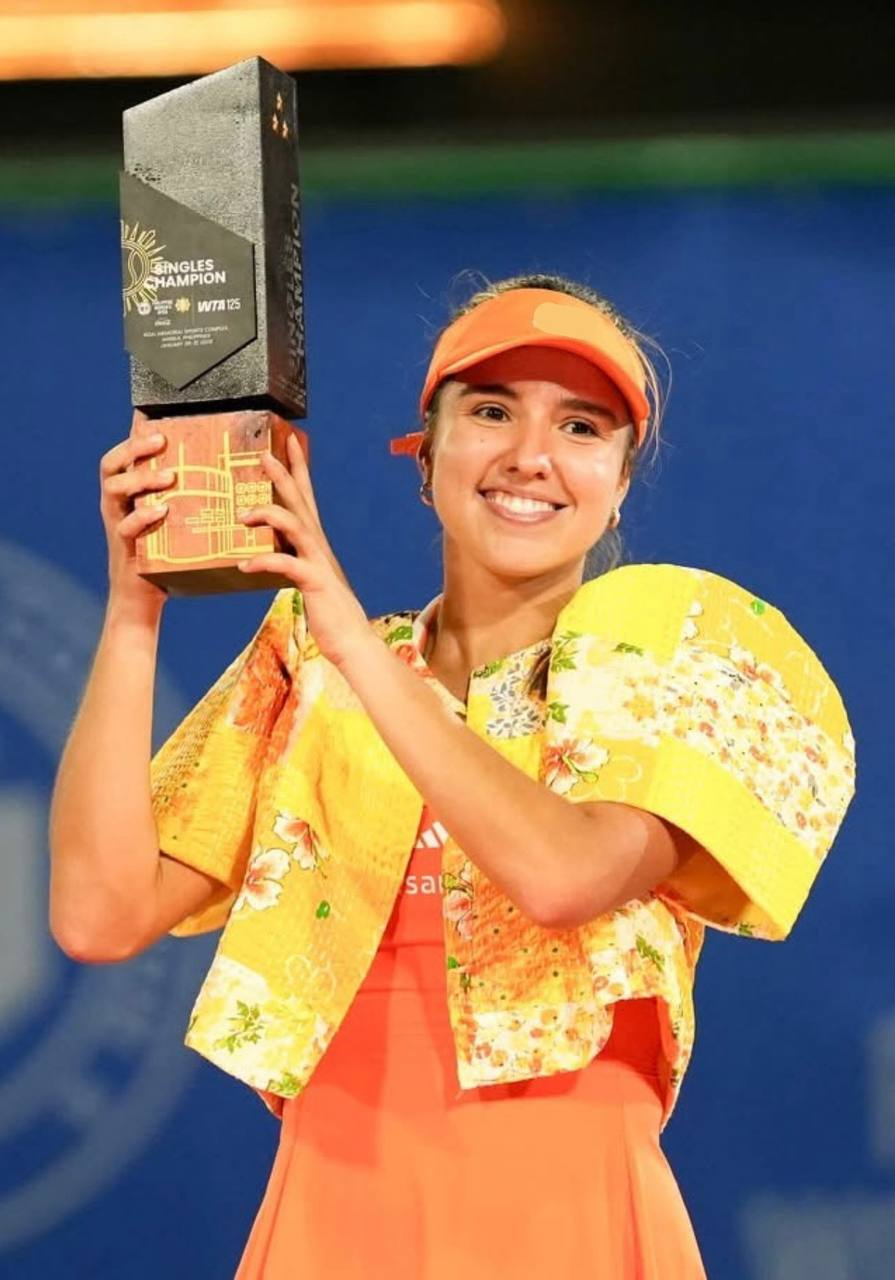
Camila Osorio with the 2026 Philippine Women’s Open singles winners trophy

== Seeds ==
1. (Germany) Tatjana Maria (second round)
2. (Philippines) Alexandra Eala (quarterfinals)
3. (Argentina) Solana Sierra (semifinals)
4. (Croatia) Donna Vekić (final)
5. (Colombia) Camila Osorio (champion)
6. (New Zealand) Lulu Sun (first round)
7. (Switzerland) Simona Waltert (first round)
8. (Latvia) Darja Semeņistaja (first round)

== Draw ==
Key

- Q = Qualifier
- WC = Wild card
- LL = Lucky loser
- Alt = Alternate
- ITF = ITF entry
- PR = Protected ranking
- SR = Special ranking
- SE = Special exempt
- JE = Junior exempt
- JR = Junior Accelerator Programme entrant
- CO = College Accelerator Programme entrant
- NG = Next Gen Accelerator Program entrant
- w/o = Walkover
- r = Retired
- d = Defaulted

=== Finals ===
Semifinals
Tatiana Prozorova	2	4
4	(Croatia) Donna Vekić	6	6
3	(Argentina) Solana Sierra	0	1
5	(Colombia) Camila Osorio	6	6

Final
4	(Croatia) Donna Vekić	6	3	5
5	(Colombia) Camila Osorio	2	6	7

=== Top half ===
First round
1	(Germany) T Maria	7^{7}	6
(France) L Jeanjean	6^{5}	4
WC	(Philippines) KA Emana	1	0
T Prozorova	6	6
(Belgium) S Costoulas	6^{8}	7^{7}	6
Q	(Slovakia) V Morvayová	7^{10}	6^{4}	4
(China) Y Ma	6	7^{8}
8	(Latvia) D Semeņistaja	1	6^{6}
4	(Croatia) D Vekić	6	6
(Japan) K Okamura	2	2
(Japan) S Saito	2	2
M Tkacheva	6	6
WC	(Philippines) T Madis	4	0
(Thailand) M Sawangkaew	6	6
(China) L Zhu	7	6
6	(New Zealand) L Sun	5	4

Second round
1	(Germany) T Maria	6^{2}	4
T Prozorova	7^{7}	6
(Belgium) S Costoulas	6	6
(China) Y Ma	2	4
4	(Croatia) D Vekić	6	6
M Tkacheva	1	2
(Thailand) M Sawangkaew	3	6^{5}
(China) L Zhu	6	7^{7}

Quarterfinals
T Prozorova	4	6	6
(Belgium) S Costoulas	6	2	4
4	(Croatia) D Vekić	6	6
(China) L Zhu	4	3

Semifinals
T Prozorova	2	4
4	(Croatia) D Vekić	6	6

=== Bottom half ===
First round
7	(Switzerland) S Waltert	2	6	2
(Thailand) L Tararudee	6	3	6
(Uzbekistan) P Kudermetova	6	7
Q	(Japan) M Kuramochi	3	5
Q	(Thailand) P Plipuech	0	4
(Ukraine) Y Starodubtseva	6	6
(Chinese Taipei) J Garland	4	6^{5}
3	(Argentina) S Sierra	6	7^{7}
5	(Colombia) C Osorio	6	6
Q	(Japan) S Hosogi	4	3
WC	(Philippines) E Abarquez	0	0
(Japan) M Hontama	6	6
(Japan) N Hibino	3	5
(Japan) H Sakatsume	6	7
A Charaeva	1	2
2/WC	(Philippines) A Eala	6	6

Second round
(Thailand) L Tararudee	6	6
(Uzbekistan) P Kudermetova	4	2
(Ukraine) Y Starodubtseva	4	3
3	(Argentina) S Sierra	6	6
5	(Colombia) C Osorio	6	4	6
(Japan) M Hontama	4	6	2
(Japan) H Sakatsume	4	0
2/WC	(Philippines) A Eala	6	6

Quarterfinals
(Thailand) L Tararudee	3	4
3	(Argentina) S Sierra	6	6
5	(Colombia) C Osorio	6	6
2/WC	(Philippines) A Eala	4	4

Semifinals
3	(Argentina) S Sierra	0	1
5	(Colombia) C Osorio	6	6

== Qualifying ==
=== Seeds ===
1. (Japan) Sakura Hosogi (qualified)
2. (Japan) Rina Saigo (qualifying competition)
3. (Slovakia) Viktória Morvayová (qualified)
4. (Japan) Miho Kuramochi (qualified)
5. (Argentina) Nicole Fossa Huergo (qualifying competition)
6. (United States) Mia Horvit (qualifying competition)
7. (Thailand) Peangtarn Plipuech (qualified)
8. (Philippines) Stefi Marithe Aludo (qualifying competition)

=== Qualifiers ===
1. (Japan) Sakura Hosogi
2. (Thailand) Peangtarn Plipuech
3. (Slovakia) Viktória Morvayová
4. (Japan) Miho Kuramochi

=== Qualifying draw ===
==== First qualifier ====
First round				Qualifying competition
				1	(Japan) Sakura Hosogi	6	6
				8/WC	(Philippines) Stefi Marithe Aludo	1	2
WC	(Philippines) Angeline Alcala	1	0	8/WC	(Philippines) Stefi Marithe Aludo	1	2
8/WC	(Philippines) Stefi Marithe Aludo	6	6

==== Second qualifier ====
First round				Qualifying competition
				2	(Japan) Rina Saigo	2	3
				7	(Thailand) Peangtarn Plipuech	6	6
WC	(Philippines) Lauraine Jallorina	0	1	7	(Thailand) Peangtarn Plipuech	6	6
7	(Thailand) Peangtarn Plipuech	6	6

==== Third qualifier ====
Qualifying competition
3	(Slovakia) Viktória Morvayová	7	6
5	(Argentina) Nicole Fossa Huergo	5	3

==== Fourth qualifier ====
Qualifying competition
4	(Japan) Miho Kuramochi	6	6
6	(United States) Mia Horvit	2	1
