= 2026 Austin Challenger – Doubles =

Doubles
- 2026 Austin Challenger

Final
- Champion: (Chinese Taipei) Chan Hao-ching (Japan) Miyu Kato
- Runner-up: (Netherlands) Isabelle Haverlag (United States) Sabrina Santamaria
- Score: 6–2, 6–3

Events
Singles	Doubles
- Austin Challenger

Maria Kozyreva and Iryna Shymanovich were the defending champions, but chose to compete in Antalya instead.

Chan Hao-ching and Miyu Kato won the title, defeating Isabelle Haverlag and Sabrina Santamaria 6–2, 6–3 in the final.

== Seeds ==
1. (Slovakia) Tereza Mihalíková / (Mexico) Giuliana Olmos (quarterfinals)
2. (Chinese Taipei) Chan Hao-ching / (Japan) Miyu Kato (champions)

== Draw ==
Key

- Q = Qualifier
- WC = Wild card
- LL = Lucky loser
- Alt = Alternate
- ITF = ITF entry
- PR = Protected ranking
- SR = Special ranking
- SE = Special exempt
- JE = Junior exempt
- JR = Junior Accelerator Programme entrant
- CO = College Accelerator Programme entrant
- NG = Next Gen Accelerator Program entrant
- w/o = Walkover
- r = Retired
- d = Defaulted

=== Draw ===
Quarterfinals
1	(Slovakia) T Mihalíková (Mexico) G Olmos	4	3
(Netherlands) I Haverlag (United States) S Santamaria	6	6
(Japan) S Aoyama (Norway) U Eikeri	7^{7}	3	[5]
(Croatia) P Marčinko (Indonesia) A Sutjiadi	6^{4}	6	[10]
(India) R Bhosale (Bosnia and Herzegovina) E Burgić	1	2
(Hong Kong) E Chong (Chinese Taipei) E-s Liang	6	6
(United States) I Corley (United States) C Harrison	5	6	[5]
2	(Chinese Taipei) H-c Chan (Japan) M Kato	7	1	[10]

Semifinals
(Netherlands) I Haverlag (United States) S Santamaria	6	6
(Croatia) P Marčinko (Indonesia) A Sutjiadi	1	3
(Hong Kong) E Chong (Chinese Taipei) E-s Liang	3	5
2	(Chinese Taipei) H-c Chan (Japan) M Kato	6	7

Final
(Netherlands) I Haverlag (United States) S Santamaria	2	3
2	(Chinese Taipei) H-c Chan (Japan) M Kato	6	6
