= 2026 Cali Open WTA 125 – Singles =

Singles
- 2026 Cali Open WTA 125

Final
- Champion: (Spain) Leyre Romero Gormaz
- Runner-up: (Canada) Bianca Andreescu
- Score: 7–6^{(7–4)}, 6–3

Events
Singles	Doubles
- Copa Bionaire

Leyre Romero Gormaz won the title, defeating Bianca Andreescu in the final, 7–6^{(7–4)}, 6–3.

Sinja Kraus was the reigning champion, but did not participate this year.

== Seeds ==
1. (France) Léolia Jeanjean (quarterfinals)
2. (Mexico) Renata Zarazúa (quarterfinals)
3. (Argentina) Solana Sierra (second round)
4. (United States) Elvina Kalieva (first round)
5. (Czech Republic) Laura Samson (second round)
6. (Austria) Julia Grabher (second round)
7. (Spain) Marina Bassols Ribera (second round)
8. (Canada) Bianca Andreescu (final)

== Draw ==
Key

- Q = Qualifier
- WC = Wild card
- LL = Lucky loser
- Alt = Alternate
- ITF = ITF entry
- PR = Protected ranking
- SR = Special ranking
- SE = Special exempt
- JE = Junior exempt
- JR = Junior Accelerator Programme entrant
- CO = College Accelerator Programme entrant
- NG = Next Gen Accelerator Program entrant
- w/o = Walkover
- r = Retired
- d = Defaulted

=== Finals ===
Semifinals
SE	(France) Alice Tubello	0	4
8	(Canada) Bianca Andreescu	6	6
(Spain) Leyre Romero Gormaz	3	7	6
(Argentina) Julia Riera	6	5	4

Final
8	(Canada) Bianca Andreescu	6^{4}	3
(Spain) Leyre Romero Gormaz	7^{7}	6

=== Top half ===
First round
1	(France) L Jeanjean	6^{2}	6	6
(Italy) L Bronzetti	7^{7}	4	3
Q	(Brazil) C Alves	6	6
WC	(Colombia) MP Pérez García	1	0
(Switzerland) R Masarova	3	0
SE	(France) A Tubello	6	6
(Belgium) S Costoulas	2	0
7	(Spain) M Bassols Ribera	6	6
4	(United States) E Kalieva	5	2
(Spain) I Burillo	7	6
WC	(Colombia) M Torres Murcia	3	0
(Argentina) L Giovannini	6	6
(Argentina) J Ortenzi	7	1	6
LL	(United States) E Mandlik	5	6	3
(Slovenia) T Zidanšek	2	3
8	(Canada) B Andreescu	6	6

Second round
1	(France) L Jeanjean	6	6
Q	(Brazil) C Alves	1	4
SE	(France) A Tubello	6	6
7	(Spain) M Bassols Ribera	1	1
(Spain) I Burillo	1	3
(Argentina) L Giovannini	6	6
(Argentina) J Ortenzi	2	3
8	(Canada) B Andreescu	6	6

Quarterfinals
1	(France) L Jeanjean	3	2
SE	(France) A Tubello	6	6
(Argentina) L Giovannini	1	3
8	(Canada) B Andreescu	6	6

Semifinals
SE	(France) A Tubello	0	4
8	(Canada) B Andreescu	6	6

=== Bottom half ===
First round
5	(Czech Republic) L Samson	6	6
WC	(Colombia) Y Lizarazo	4	3
(France) C Monnet	6	6
Q	(Colombia) M Herazo	1	0
Q	(Slovenia) P Hercog	0	1
(Spain) L Romero Gormaz	6	6
Q	(France) S Janicijevic	4	2
3	(Argentina) S Sierra	6	6
6	(Austria) J Grabher	3	6	6
(Brazil) L Pigossi	6	3	2
WC	(Colombia) V Mediorreal Arias	1	1
(Argentina) J Riera	6	6
(Argentina) ML Carlé	2	7	4
(Greece) D Papamichail	6	5	6
LL	(United States) K Scott	1	1
2	(Mexico) R Zarazúa	6	6

Second round
5	(Czech Republic) L Samson	6	6^{4}	3
(France) C Monnet	3	7^{7}	6
(Spain) L Romero Gormaz	6	6
3	(Argentina) S Sierra	4	1
6	(Austria) J Grabher	2	4
(Argentina) J Riera	6	6
(Greece) D Papamichail	6^{6}	5
2	(Mexico) R Zarazúa	7^{8}	7

Quarterfinals
(France) C Monnet	6	5	4
(Spain) L Romero Gormaz	4	7	6
(Argentina) J Riera	6	1	6
2	(Mexico) R Zarazúa	4	6	2

Semifinals
(Spain) L Romero Gormaz	3	7	6
(Argentina) J Riera	6	5	4

== Qualifying ==
=== Seeds ===
1. (Slovenia) Polona Hercog (qualified)
2. (United States) Elizabeth Mandlik (qualifying competition, lucky loser)
3. (Brazil) Laura Pigossi (moved to main draw)
4. (Brazil) Carolina Alves (qualified)

=== Qualifiers ===
1. (Slovenia) Polona Hercog
2. (France) Séléna Janicijevic
3. (Colombia) María Herazo
4. (Brazil) Carolina Alves

=== Lucky losers ===
1. (United States) Elizabeth Mandlik
2. (United States) Katrina Scott

=== Qualifying draw ===
==== First qualifier ====
Qualifying competition
1	(Slovenia) Polona Hercog	6	6
WC	(Colombia) María José Rico Sánchez	0	0

==== Second qualifier ====
Qualifying competition
2	(United States) Elizabeth Mandlik	3	7	2
	(France) Séléna Janicijevic	6	5	6

==== Third qualifier ====
Qualifying competition
Alt	(Colombia) María Herazo	7^{7}	6
	(United States) Katrina Scott	6^{2}	4

==== Fourth qualifier ====
Qualifying competition
4	(Brazil) Carolina Alves
	Bye
