= 2025 BBVA Open Internacional de Valencia =

- Date: 9–15 June 2025
- Edition: 5th
- Category: WTA 125
- Prize money: $115,000
- Surface: Clay
- Location: Valencia, Spain
- Venue: Valencia Tennis Club

Champions

Singles
- (Spain) Nuria Párrizas Díaz

Doubles
- Maria Kozyreva / Iryna Shymanovich
- Open Internacional de Valencia

The 2025 BBVA Open Internacional de Valencia was a professional women's tennis tournament played on outdoor clay courts. It was the fifth edition of the tournament and part of the 2025 WTA 125 tournaments. It took place in Valencia, Spain between 9 and 15 June 2025.

== Singles main-draw entrants ==
=== Seeds ===
| Country | Player | Rank^{1} | Seed |
|---|---|---|---|
| ARG | Solana Sierra | 110 | 1 |
| ESP | Nuria Párrizas Díaz | 114 | 2 |
| LAT | Darja Semeņistaja | 124 | 3 |
| ARG | María Lourdes Carlé | 127 | 4 |
| CHN | Wang Xiyu | 139 | 5 |
| CHN | Gao Xinyu | 145 | 6 |
| ~~AND~~ | ~~Victoria Jiménez Kasintseva~~ | ~~146~~ | ~~7~~ |
| | Oksana Selekhmeteva | 147 | 8 |
| GER | Tamara Korpatsch | 148 | 9 |

- ^{1} Rankings are as of 26 May 2025.

=== Other entrants ===
The following players received wildcards into the singles main draw:

- (Spain) Charo Esquiva Bañuls
- Alina Korneeva
- (Spain) Carlota Martínez Cirez
- (Spain) Kaitlin Quevedo

The following players received entry from the qualifying draw:

- Alina Charaeva
- (Spain) Ariana Geerlings
- Ekaterina Kazionova
- (Spain) Ane Mintegi del Olmo

The following players received entry as lucky losers:

- (Spain) Ángela Fita Boluda
- (Georgia (country)) Ekaterine Gorgodze

=== Withdrawals ===
- (France) Loïs Boisson → replaced by (Ukraine) Anastasiia Sobolieva
- (Hungary) Anna Bondár → replaced by (Spain) Andrea Lázaro García
- (Andorra) Victoria Jiménez Kasintseva → replaced by (Spain) Ángela Fita Boluda (LL)
- (Montenegro) Danka Kovinić → replaced by (Japan) Haruka Kaji
- (Romania) Patricia Maria Țig → replaced by (Georgia (country)) Ekaterine Gorgodze (LL)

== Doubles entrants ==
=== Seeds ===
| Country | Player | Country | Player | Rank^{1} | Seed |
|---|---|---|---|---|---|
| | Maria Kozyreva | | Iryna Shymanovich | 225 | 1 |
| USA | Makenna Jones | BRA | Laura Pigossi | 307 | 2 |

- ^{1} Rankings as of 26 May 2025.

=== Other entrants ===
The following pair received a wildcard into the doubles main draw:

- Alina Korneeva / (Argentina) Solana Sierra

The following pair received entry as alternates:

- Alevtina Ibragimova / (Bosnia and Herzegovina) Anita Wagner

=== Withdrawals ===
- (Latvia) Darja Semeņistaja / (Ukraine) Anastasiia Sobolieva → replaced by Alevtina Ibragimova / (Bosnia and Herzegovina) Anita Wagner

== Champions ==
=== Singles ===
- (Spain) Nuria Párrizas Díaz def. (United States) Louisa Chirico, 7–5, 7–6^{(11–9)}

=== Doubles ===
- Maria Kozyreva / Iryna Shymanovich def. (Spain) Yvonne Cavallé Reimers / (Spain) Ángela Fita Boluda, 6–3, 6–4
