= 2025 BBVA Open Internacional de Valencia – Singles =

Singles
- 2025 BBVA Open Internacional de Valencia

Final
- Champion: (Spain) Nuria Párrizas Díaz
- Runner-up: (United States) Louisa Chirico
- Score: 7–5, 7–6^{(11–9)}

Details
- Draw: 32 (4 WC)
- Seeds: 8

Events
Singles	Doubles
- Open Internacional de Valencia

Nuria Párrizas Díaz won the singles title at the 2025 BBVA Open Internacional de Valencia, defeating Louisa Chirico in the final, 7–5, 7–6^{(11–9)}.

Ann Li was the reigning champion, but chose to compete in s'Hertogenbosch instead.

== Seeds ==
1. (Argentina) Solana Sierra (quarterfinals)
2. (Spain) Nuria Párrizas Díaz (champion)
3. (Latvia) Darja Semeņistaja (first round)
4. (Argentina) María Lourdes Carlé (second round)
5. (China) Wang Xiyu (first round)
6. (China) Gao Xinyu (semifinals)
7. (Andorra) Victoria Jiménez Kasintseva (withdrew)
8. Oksana Selekhmeteva (second round)
9. (Germany) Tamara Korpatsch (second round)

== Draw ==
Key

- Q = Qualifier
- WC = Wild card
- LL = Lucky loser
- Alt = Alternate
- ITF = ITF entry
- PR = Protected ranking
- SR = Special ranking
- SE = Special exempt
- JE = Junior exempt
- JR = Junior Accelerator Programme entrant
- CO = College Accelerator Programme entrant
- NG = Next Gen Accelerator Program entrant
- w/o = Walkover
- r = Retired
- d = Defaulted

=== Finals ===
Semifinals
(Belgium) Hanne Vandewinkel	4	6^{5}
(United States) Louisa Chirico	6	7^{7}
6	(China) Gao Xinyu	6	4	4
2	(Spain) Nuria Párrizas Díaz	2	6	6

Final
(United States) Louisa Chirico	5	6^{9}
2	(Spain) Nuria Párrizas Díaz	7	7^{11}

=== Top half ===
First round
1	(Argentina) S Sierra	6	6
Q	E Kazionova	1	2
Q	(Spain) A Geerlings	6	6
(Brazil) L Pigossi	4	3
(Belgium) H Vandewinkel	6	6
(Croatia) L Bošković	3	3
LL	(Spain) A Fita Boluda	2	4
8	O Selekhmeteva	6	6
4	(Argentina) ML Carlé	6	6
(Japan) H Kaji	1	2
(United States) L Chirico	6	4	6
WC	(Spain) C Esquiva Bañuls	1	6	4
LL	(Georgia (country)) E Gorgodze	4	2
(Spain) L Romero Gormaz	6	6
(Germany) M Barthel	4	6	7^{7}
5	(China) Xiy Wang	6	1	6^{3}

Second round
1	(Argentina) S Sierra	6	6
Q	(Spain) A Geerlings	1	1
(Belgium) H Vandewinkel	6	6
8	O Selekhmeteva	4	4
4	(Argentina) ML Carlé	4	4
(United States) L Chirico	6	6
(Spain) L Romero Gormaz	3	6	4
(Germany) M Barthel	6	3	6

Quarterfinals
1	(Argentina) S Sierra	4	6	3
(Belgium) H Vandewinkel	6	4	6
(United States) L Chirico	6	7^{7}
(Germany) M Barthel	4	6^{4}

Semifinals
(Belgium) H Vandewinkel	4	6^{5}
(United States) L Chirico	6	7^{7}

=== Bottom half ===
First round
6	(China) X Gao	6	2	6
WC	A Korneeva	2	6	4
(Cyprus) R Șerban	6	6
(Turkey) B Cengiz	3	4
WC	(Spain) K Quevedo	4	4
Q	A Charaeva	6	6
I Shymanovich	6	6
3	(Latvia) D Semeņistaja	3	3
9	(Germany) T Korpatsch	6	6
(Spain) G Maristany	4	2
WC	(Spain) C Martínez Círez	3	2
(Czech Republic) S Bejlek	6	6
(Spain) A Lázaro García	1	7	0
Q	(Spain) A Mintegi del Olmo	6	5	6
(Ukraine) A Sobolieva	5	6^{5}
2	(Spain) N Párrizas Díaz	7	7^{7}

Second round
6	(China) X Gao	6	6
(Cyprus) R Șerban	0	2
Q	A Charaeva	4	6^{6}
I Shymanovich	6	7^{8}
9	(Germany) T Korpatsch	1	4
(Czech Republic) S Bejlek	6	6
Q	(Spain) A Mintegi del Olmo	6	3	3
2	(Spain) N Párrizas Díaz	4	6	6

Quarterfinals
6	(China) X Gao	3	6	6
I Shymanovich	6	4	4
(Czech Republic) S Bejlek
2	(Spain) N Párrizas Díaz	w/o

Semifinals
6	(China) X Gao	6	2	4
2	(Spain) N Párrizas Díaz	4	6	6

== Qualifying ==
=== Seeds ===
1. (Japan) Aoi Ito (first round)
2. Alina Charaeva (qualified)
3. (Spain) Ángela Fita Boluda (qualifying competition, lucky loser)
4. (Georgia (country)) Ekaterine Gorgodze (qualifying competition, lucky loser)
5. (Turkey) Berfu Cengiz (moved to main draw)
6. (Switzerland) Ylena In-Albon (first round)
7. Alevtina Ibragimova (first round)
8. (Spain) Lucía Cortez Llorca (first round)

=== Qualifiers ===
1. (Spain) Ariana Geerlings
2. Alina Charaeva
3. (Spain) Ane Mintegi del Olmo
4. Ekaterina Kazionova

=== Lucky losers ===
1. (Spain) Ángela Fita Boluda
2. (Georgia (country)) Ekaterine Gorgodze

=== Qualifying draw ===
==== First qualifier ====
First round
1	(Japan) Aoi Ito	6^{2}	6	2
(Spain) Ariana Geerlings	7^{7}	3	6
(Italy) Diletta Cherubini	6	3	6
7	Alevtina Ibragimova	4	6	4

Qualifying competition
(Spain) Ariana Geerlings	6	6
(Italy) Diletta Cherubini	2	2

==== Second qualifier ====
First round
2	Alina Charaeva	6	6
Maria Kozyreva	2	3
(Spain) Alicia Herrero Liñana	3	7^{7}	6
Alt	(Spain) Carmen López Martínez	6	6^{3}	4

Qualifying competition
2	Alina Charaeva	6	6
(Spain) Alicia Herrero Liñana	1	3

==== Third qualifier ====
First round
3	(Spain) Ángela Fita Boluda	6	6
WC	(Spain) Sofía Montesinos	0	2
WC	(Spain) Ane Mintegi del Olmo	7^{7}	7
6	(Switzerland) Ylena In-Albon	6^{2}	5

Qualifying competition
3	(Spain) Ángela Fita Boluda	6	6^{6}	1
WC	(Spain) Ane Mintegi del Olmo	1	7^{8}	6

==== Fourth qualifier ====
First round
4	(Georgia (country)) Ekaterine Gorgodze	6	6
(United States) Makenna Jones	2	1
Ekaterina Kazionova	6	7
8	(Spain) Lucía Cortez Llorca	1	5

Qualifying competition
4	(Georgia (country)) Ekaterine Gorgodze	5	6	5
Ekaterina Kazionova	7	4	7
