= 2024 BBVA Open Internacional de Valencia – Singles =

Singles
- 2024 BBVA Open Internacional de Valencia

Final
- Champion: (United States) Ann Li
- Runner-up: (Bulgaria) Viktoriya Tomova
- Score: 6–3, 6–4

Details
- Draw: 32 (5 WC)
- Seeds: 8

Events
Singles	Doubles
- Open Internacional de Valencia

Ann Li won the title, defeating Viktoriya Tomova in the final, 6–3, 6–4.

Mayar Sherif was the reigning champion, but chose not to defend her title.

== Seeds ==
1. (Bulgaria) Viktoriya Tomova (final)
2. (Spain) Jéssica Bouzas Maneiro (semifinals)
3. (Italy) Martina Trevisan (second round)
4. (Slovakia) Rebecca Šramková (second round)
5. (Mexico) Renata Zarazúa (second round)
6. Maria Timofeeva (first round, retired)
7. (Spain) Marina Bassols Ribera (quarterfinals)
8. (Latvia) Darja Semeņistaja (quarterfinals)

== Draw ==
Key

- Q = Qualifier
- WC = Wild card
- LL = Lucky loser
- Alt = Alternate
- ITF = ITF entry
- PR = Protected ranking
- SR = Special ranking
- SE = Special exempt
- JE = Junior exempt
- JR = Junior Accelerator Programme entrant
- CO = College Accelerator Programme entrant
- NG = Next Gen Accelerator Program entrant
- w/o = Walkover
- r = Retired
- d = Defaulted

=== Finals ===
Semifinals
1	(Bulgaria) Viktoriya Tomova	2	6	6
Iryna Shymanovich	6	3	4
(United States) Ann Li	3	6	6
2	(Spain) Jéssica Bouzas Maneiro	6	2	4

Final
1	(Bulgaria) Viktoriya Tomova	3	4
(United States) Ann Li	6	6

=== Top half ===
First round
1	(Bulgaria) V Tomova	6	4	6
(Croatia) L Bošković	0	6	2
(Romania) M Bulgaru	2	2
O Selekhmeteva	6	6
(Romania) I-C Begu	6	6
(Slovenia) T Zidanšek	1	1
(Spain) N Párrizas Díaz	6^{4}	6	4
8	(Latvia) D Semeņistaja	7^{7}	3	6
4	(Slovakia) R Šramková	6	6
Q	(Thailand) L Tararudee	3	1
(Brazil) L Pigossi	6	6
WC	(Spain) L Romero Gormaz	4	0
LL	(Czech Republic) D Šalková	4	4
I Shymanovich	6	6
WC	(Spain) C Esquiva Bañuls	1	2
5	(Mexico) R Zarazúa	6	6

Second round
1	(Bulgaria) V Tomova	7	2	6
O Selekhmeteva	5	6	1
(Romania) I-C Begu	6	3	4
8	(Latvia) D Semeņistaja	3	6	6
4	(Slovakia) R Šramková	6^{5}	7^{8}	6^{10}
(Brazil) L Pigossi	7^{7}	6^{6}	7^{12}
I Shymanovich	6	6
5	(Mexico) R Zarazúa	4	2

Quarterfinals
1	(Bulgaria) V Tomova	6	6
8	(Latvia) D Semeņistaja	3	1
(Brazil) L Pigossi	0	6^{1}
I Shymanovich	6	7^{7}

Semifinals
1	(Bulgaria) V Tomova	2	6	6
I Shymanovich	6	3	4

=== Bottom half ===
First round
6	M Timofeeva	4	1^{r}
(Germany) M Barthel	6	3
(United States) E Kalieva	7	1	6
(United States) V Lepchenko	5	6	2
WC	(Spain) G Maristany	4	7^{7}	1
(United States) A Li	6	6^{3}	6
Q	(Spain) L Cortez Llorca	3	3
3	(Italy) M Trevisan	6	6
7	(Spain) M Bassols Ribera	6	0	6
(Ukraine) K Zavatska	4	6	3
LL	(Australia) S Mendez	6	7
WC	(Spain) I Burillo Escorihuela	1	5
(Slovenia) P Hercog	6	6
Q	(Spain) E Guerrero Álvarez	2	4
Q	(Italy) N Brancaccio	6^{3}	4
2	(Spain) J Bouzas Maneiro	7^{7}	6

Second round
(Germany) M Barthel	6	4	1
(United States) E Kalieva	3	6	6
(United States) A Li	2	6	6
3	(Italy) M Trevisan	6	3	3
7	(Spain) M Bassols Ribera	6	6
LL	(Australia) S Mendez	0	3
(Slovenia) P Hercog	1	2
2	(Spain) J Bouzas Maneiro	6	6

Quarterfinals
(United States) E Kalieva	2	0
(United States) A Li	6	6
7	(Spain) M Bassols Ribera	7	3	2
2	(Spain) J Bouzas Maneiro	5	6	6

Semifinals
(United States) A Li	3	6	6
2	(Spain) J Bouzas Maneiro	6	2	4

== Qualifying ==
=== Seeds ===
1. (Czech Republic) Dominika Šalková (qualifying competition, lucky loser)
2. (Thailand) Lanlana Tararudee (qualified)
3. (Germany) Mona Barthel (moved to main draw)
4. (Italy) Nuria Brancaccio (qualified)
5. (Australia) Seone Mendez (qualifying competition, lucky loser)
6. (Spain) Ángela Fita Boluda (qualifying competition)
7. (Spain) Eva Guerrero Álvarez (qualified)
8. (Spain) Lucía Cortez Llorca (qualified)

=== Qualifiers ===
1. (Spain) Lucía Cortez Llorca
2. (Thailand) Lanlana Tararudee
3. (Spain) Eva Guerrero Álvarez
4. (Italy) Nuria Brancaccio

=== Lucky losers ===
1. (Czech Republic) Dominika Šalková
2. (Australia) Seone Mendez

=== Qualifying draw ===
==== First qualifier ====
First round
1	(Czech Republic) Dominika Šalková	6	6
WC	(Spain) Ainhoa Caballer Catiru	1	1
WC	(Spain) Ariana Geerlings	6	2	3
8	(Spain) Lucía Cortez Llorca	2	6	6

Qualifying competition
1	(Czech Republic) Dominika Šalková	5	6	4
8	(Spain) Lucía Cortez Llorca	7	3	6

==== Second qualifier ====
First round
2	(Thailand) Lanlana Tararudee	6	6
(Spain) Carmen López Martínez	1	4
WC	(Spain) Nuria Sanz	0	0
5	(Australia) Seone Mendez	6	6

Qualifying competition
2	(Thailand) Lanlana Tararudee	6	6
5	(Australia) Seone Mendez	3	3

==== Third qualifier ====
First round
Alt	(Ukraine) Valeriia Fomenko	4	2
Ekaterina Yashina	6	6
WC	(Spain) Alba Almenar Zabala	0	1
7	(Spain) Eva Guerrero Álvarez	6	6

Qualifying competition
Ekaterina Yashina	1	2
7	(Spain) Eva Guerrero Álvarez	6	6

==== Fourth qualifier ====
First round
4	(Italy) Nuria Brancaccio	6	6
(Spain) Raquel González Vilar	1	0
Maria Andrienko	1	2
6	(Spain) Ángela Fita Boluda	6	6

Qualifying competition
4	(Italy) Nuria Brancaccio	7^{8}	6
6	(Spain) Ángela Fita Boluda	6^{6}	1
