= 2025 Mallorca Women's Championships =

- Date: 6–12 October 2025
- Edition: 1st
- Category: WTA 125
- Prize money: $115,000
- Surface: Clay
- Location: Mallorca, Spain

Champions

Singles
- (Argentina) Solana Sierra

Doubles
- (Czech Republic) Jesika Malečková / (Czech Republic) Miriam Škoch
- Mallorca Women's Championships

The 2025 Mallorca Women's Championships, also known as Vanda Pharmaceuticals Mallorca Women's Championships presented by EcoTrans Group, was a professional women's tennis tournament played on outdoor clay courts. It was the first edition of the tournament and part of the 2025 WTA 125 tournaments. It took place in Mallorca, Spain between 6 and 12 October 2025.

== Singles main-draw entrants ==
=== Seeds ===
Country	Player	Rank^{1}	Seed
ARG	Solana Sierra	78	1
EGY	Mayar Sherif	100	2
LAT	Darja Semeņistaja	104	3
HUN	Panna Udvardy	111	4
CZE	Sára Bejlek	117	5
	Oksana Selekhmeteva	125	6
NED	Arantxa Rus	126	7
ARG	María Lourdes Carlé	129	8

- ^{1} Rankings are as of 29 September 2025.

=== Other entrants ===
The following players received wildcards into the singles main draw:

- (Spain) Cristina Diaz Adrover
- (Germany) Noma Noha Akugue
- (Germany) Julia Stusek
- (Germany) Mariella Thamm

The following players received entry from the qualifying draw:

- (Germany) Mina Hodzic
- (Serbia) Teodora Kostović
- (France) Carole Monnet
- (Italy) Dalila Spiteri

The following players received entry as lucky losers:

- (Ukraine) Yelyzaveta Kotliar
- (Czech Republic) Aneta Kučmová

=== Withdrawals ===
Before the tournament

- (Poland) Maja Chwalińska → replaced by (Czech Republic) Aneta Kučmová (LL)
- (France) Alizé Cornet → replaced by (Argentina) Paula Ormaechea
- (United States) Bernarda Pera → replaced by (Ukraine) Yelyzaveta Kotliar (LL)
- (Romania) Anca Todoni → replaced by (Serbia) Lola Radivojevic

== Doubles entrants ==
=== Seeds ===
Country	Player	Country	Player	Rank	Seed
CZE	Jesika Malečková	CZE	Miriam Škoch	162	1
ESP	Yvonne Cavallé Reimers	ITA	Angelica Moratelli	190	2

- Rankings as of 29 September 2025.

=== Other entrants ===
The following pair received a wildcard into the doubles main draw:

- (Germany) Noma Noha Akugue / (Germany) Mariella Thamm

== Champions ==
=== Singles ===
- (Argentina) Solana Sierra def. (Serbia) Lola Radivojević 6–3, 6–1

=== Doubles ===
- (Czech Republic) Jesika Malečková / (Czech Republic) Miriam Škoch def. (Germany) Noma Noha Akugue / (Germany) Mariella Thamm, 6–4, 6–0
