= 2026 BBVA Open Internacional de Valencia – Singles =

Singles
- 2026 BBVA Open Internacional de Valencia

Final
- Champion: (France) Clara Burel
- Runner-up: (Spain) Alicia Herrero Liñana
- Score: 4–6, 6–0, 6–2

Details
- Draw: 32 (4 WC)
- Seeds: 8

Events
Singles	Doubles
- Open Internacional de Valencia

Clara Burel won the title, defeating Alicia Herrero Liñana in the final, 4–6, 6–0, 6–2.

Nuria Párrizas Díaz was the reigning champion, but she retired from professional tennis in July 2026.

== Seeds ==
1. (Spain) Oksana Selekhmeteva (first round)
2. (Slovenia) Veronika Erjavec (first round)
3. (Poland) Katarzyna Kawa (first round)
4. (Spain) Marina Bassols Ribera (second round)
5. (Spain) Andrea Lázaro García (quarterfinals)
6. (Spain) Leyre Romero Gormaz (first round)
7. (Switzerland) Rebeka Masarova (second round)
8. (Greece) Despina Papamichail (quarterfinals)

== Draw ==
Key

- Q = Qualifier
- WC = Wild card
- LL = Lucky loser
- Alt = Alternate
- ITF = ITF entry
- PR = Protected ranking
- SR = Special ranking
- SE = Special exempt
- JE = Junior exempt
- JR = Junior Accelerator Programme entrant
- CO = College Accelerator Programme entrant
- NG = Next Gen Accelerator Program entrant
- w/o = Walkover
- r = Retired
- d = Defaulted

=== Finals ===
Semifinals
(Spain) Alicia Herrero Liñana	6	6
(Morocco) Yasmine Kabbaj	0	3
PR	(France) Clara Burel	6	6
Q	(Germany) Joëlle Steur	1	4

Final
(Spain) Alicia Herrero Liñana	6	0	2
PR	(France) Clara Burel	4	6	6

=== Top half ===
First round
1	(Spain) O Selekhmeteva	5	4
Q	(Germany) N Schunk	7	6
Q	(United States) M Sieg	6^{0}	4
(Spain) I Burillo	7^{7}	6
(Spain) A Herrero Liñana	2	7	7
WC	(Spain) L Cortez Llorca	6	5	5
(Germany) M Hodzic	5	6^{4}
7	(Switzerland) R Masarova	7	7^{7}
3	(Poland) K Kawa	3	3
WC	(Spain) M García Cid	6	6
(Spain) Á Fita Boluda	2	1
(Morocco) Y Kabbaj	6	6
(Italy) J Ruggeri	5	7^{11}	6
(Netherlands) E Vedder	7	6^{9}	1
(Italy) N Brancaccio	3	4
8	(Greece) D Papamichail	6	6

Second round
Q	(Germany) N Schunk	2	2
(Spain) I Burillo	6	6
(Spain) A Herrero Liñana	6	6
7	(Switzerland) R Masarova	1	2
WC	(Spain) M García Cid	6	4	3
(Morocco) Y Kabbaj	4	6	6
(Italy) J Ruggeri	1	7^{7}	5
8	(Greece) D Papamichail	6	6^{4}	7

Quarterfinals
(Spain) I Burillo	2	1
(Spain) A Herrero Liñana	6	6
(Morocco) Y Kabbaj	6	7
8	(Greece) D Papamichail	1	5

Semifinals
(Spain) A Herrero Liñana	6	6
(Morocco) Y Kabbaj	0	3

=== Bottom half ===
First round
6	(Spain) L Romero Gormaz	6	2	4
(Italy) M Trevisan	1	6	6
PR	(France) C Burel	7^{7}	6
Q	(Spain) A Teixidó García	6^{3}	0
(Turkey) B Cengiz	5	5
(Spain) G Maristany	7	7
(Germany) E Bennemann	4	2
4	(Spain) M Bassols Ribera	6	6
5	(Spain) A Lázaro García	6	6
WC	(Spain) C Martínez Círez	2	2
(Spain) A Mintegi del Olmo	6	6
PR	(Spain) A Geerlings	1	4
Q	(Germany) J Steur	6	6
WC	(Spain) C Esquiva Bañuls	1	3
(Malta) F Curmi	6	2	6
2	(Slovenia) V Erjavec	1	6	2

Second round
(Italy) M Trevisan
PR	(France) C Burel	w/o
(Spain) G Maristany	6	3	6
4	(Spain) M Bassols Ribera	3	6	4
5	(Spain) A Lázaro García	7^{7}	6
(Spain) A Mintegi del Olmo	6^{2}	3
Q	(Germany) J Steur	6^{6}	6	6
(Malta) F Curmi	7^{8}	3	4

Quarterfinals
PR	(France) C Burel	6	6
(Spain) G Maristany	2	4
5	(Spain) A Lázaro García	3	6	4
Q	(Germany) J Steur	6	2	6

Semifinals
PR	(France) C Burel	6	6
Q	(Germany) J Steur	1	4

== Qualifying ==
=== Seeds ===
1. (Germany) Nastasja Schunk (qualified)
2. (Italy) Jessica Pieri (first round)
3. (Germany) Joëlle Steur (qualified)
4. (Germany) Tessa Brockmann (first round)
5. (Ecuador) Mell Reasco González (first round)
6. (Slovenia) Dalila Jakupović (qualifying competition)
7. (Bulgaria) Isabella Shinikova (first round)
8. (United States) Madison Sieg (qualified)

=== Qualifiers ===
1. (Germany) Nastasja Schunk
2. (United States) Madison Sieg
3. (Germany) Joëlle Steur
4. (Spain) Aran Teixidó García

=== Qualifying draw ===
==== First qualifier ====
First round
1	(Germany) Nastasja Schunk	6	1
Ekaterina Kazionova	2	5^{r}
WC	(Spain) Nuria Sarganella Verdu	2	3
6	(Slovenia) Dalila Jakupović	6	6

Qualifying competition
1	(Germany) Nastasja Schunk	7^{7}	7
6	(Slovenia) Dalila Jakupović	6^{3}	5

==== Second qualifier ====
First round
2	(Italy) Jessica Pieri	4	0
(Spain) Ruth Roura Llaverías	6	6
(Croatia) Tena Lukas	3	4
8	(United States) Madison Sieg	6	6

Qualifying competition
(Spain) Ruth Roura Llaverías	5	2
8	(United States) Madison Sieg	7	6

==== Third qualifier ====
First round
3	(Germany) Joëlle Steur	6	6
WC	(Spain) Neus Torner Sensano	3	1
(Italy) Dalila Spiteri	6	0	6
5	(Ecuador) Mell Reasco González	4	6	1

Qualifying competition
3	(Germany) Joëlle Steur	6	7^{7}
(Italy) Dalila Spiteri	1	6^{0}

==== Fourth qualifier ====
First round
4	(Germany) Tessa Brockmann	6	5	2
(Spain) Aran Teixidó García	2	7	6
(Italy) Diletta Cherubini	4	6	6
7	(Bulgaria) Isabella Shinikova	6	4	4

Qualifying competition
(Spain) Aran Teixidó García	6	6
(Italy) Diletta Cherubini	4	0
