= 2024 BBVA Open Internacional de Valencia =

- Date: 10–16 June 2024
- Edition: 4th
- Category: WTA 125
- Prize money: $115,000
- Surface: Clay
- Location: Valencia, Spain
- Venue: Valencia Tennis Club

Champions

Singles
- (United States) Ann Li

Doubles
- (Poland) Katarzyna Piter / (Hungary) Fanny Stollár
- Open Internacional de Valencia

The 2024 BBVA Open Internacional de Valencia was a professional women's tennis tournament played on outdoor clay courts. It was the fourth edition of the tournament, which was also part of the 2024 WTA 125 tournaments season. It took place in Valencia, Spain between 10 and 16 June 2024.

== Singles main-draw entrants ==
=== Seeds ===
Country	Player	Rank^{1}	Seed
BUL	Viktoriya Tomova	75	1
ESP	Jéssica Bouzas Maneiro	86	2
ITA	Martina Trevisan	92	3
SVK	Rebecca Šramková	101	4
MEX	Renata Zarazúa	102	5
	Maria Timofeeva	105	6
ESP	Marina Bassols Ribera	111	7
LAT	Darja Semeņistaja	118	8

- ^{1} Rankings are as of 27 May 2024.

=== Other entrants ===
The following players received wildcards into the singles main draw:

- (Spain) Irene Burillo Escorihuela
- (Spain) Charo Esquiva Bañuls
- (Spain) Guiomar Maristany
- (Spain) Leyre Romero Gormaz

The following players received entry from the qualifying draw:

- (Italy) Nuria Brancaccio
- (Spain) Lucía Cortez Llorca
- (Spain) Eva Guerrero Álvarez
- (Thailand) Lanlana Tararudee

The following players received entry as lucky losers:

- (Australia) Seone Mendez
- (Czech Republic) Dominika Šalková

=== Withdrawals ===
- (Ukraine) Anastasiya Soboleva → replaced by (Australia) Seone Mendez

== Doubles entrants ==
=== Seeds ===
Country	Player	Country	Player	Rank^{1}	Seed
	Amina Anshba	CZE	Anastasia Dețiuc	196	1
POL	Katarzyna Piter	HUN	Fanny Stollár	212	2

- ^{1} Rankings as of 27 May 2024.

=== Other entrants ===
The following pair received wildcard into the doubles main draw:

- (Spain) Charo Esquiva Bañuls / (Spain) Ángela Fita Boluda

The following pair received entry as alternates:

- (Australia) Seone Mendez / Ekaterina Yashina

=== Withdrawals ===
- (Brazil) Laura Pigossi / (United States) Sabrina Santamaria → replaced by (Australia) Seone Mendez / Ekaterina Yashina

== Champions ==
=== Singles ===
- (United States) Ann Li def. (Bulgaria) Viktoriya Tomova 6–3, 6–4

=== Doubles ===
- (Poland) Katarzyna Piter / (Hungary) Fanny Stollár def. (Italy) Angelica Moratelli / (Mexico) Renata Zarazúa 6–1, 4–6, [10–8]
