= 2026 Mallorca Women's Championships – Singles =

Singles
- 2026 Mallorca Women's Championships

Final
- Champion: (Spain) Ariana Geerlings
- Runner-up: (Czech Republic) Laura Samson
- Score: 6–2, 6–2

Details
- Draw: 32 (4Q / 4WC)
- Seeds: 8

Events
Singles	Doubles
- Mallorca Women's Championships

Solana Sierra was the reigning champion, but withdrew before the tournament began.

Ariana Geerlings won the title, defeating Laura Samson 6–2, 6–2 in the final.

== Seeds ==
1. (Austria) Julia Grabher (quarterfinals)
2. (Czech Republic) Laura Samson (final)
3. (Germany) Noma Noha Akugue (first round)
4. (Spain) Marina Bassols Ribera (second round)
5. (Spain) Andrea Lázaro García (quarterfinals, retired)
6. (Slovenia) Tamara Zidanšek (semifinals)
7. (Bulgaria) Elizara Yaneva (quarterfinals)
8. (Georgia (country)) Ekaterine Gorgodze (first round)

== Draw ==
Key

- Q = Qualifier
- WC = Wild card
- LL = Lucky loser
- Alt = Alternate
- ITF = ITF entry
- PR = Protected ranking
- SR = Special ranking
- SE = Special exempt
- JE = Junior exempt
- JR = Junior Accelerator Programme entrant
- CO = College Accelerator Programme entrant
- NG = Next Gen Accelerator Program entrant
- w/o = Walkover
- r = Retired
- d = Defaulted

=== Finals ===
Semifinals
WC	(Spain) Ariana Geerlings	6	6
(Malta) Francesca Curmi	2	3
6	(Slovenia) Tamara Zidanšek	1	6	3
2	(Czech Republic) Laura Samson	6	1	6

Final
WC	(Spain) Ariana Geerlings	6	6
2	(Czech Republic) Laura Samson	2	2

=== Top half ===
First round
1	(Austria) J Grabher	3	6	6
(Italy) D Chiesa	6	4	4
Q	(Czech Republic) A Kučmová	2	4
LL	(Bulgaria) L Encheva	6	6
WC	(Bosnia and Herzegovina) T Kovačević	2	4
WC	(Spain) A Geerlings	6	6
WC	(Spain) L Cortez Llorca	6	7^{7}
8	(Georgia (country)) E Gorgodze	4	6^{3}
4	(Spain) M Bassols Ribera	6	6
Q	(Germany) I Wobker	1	3
(Netherlands) E Vedder	6	5	0
(Malta) F Curmi	4	7	6
Q	(Ukraine) D Yesypchuk	2	2
(France) C Monnet	6	6
(Italy) J Ruggeri	6	6^{3}	1
7	(Bulgaria) E Yaneva	1	7^{7}	6

Second round
1	(Austria) J Grabher	4	7	6
LL	(Bulgaria) L Encheva	6	5	4
WC	(Spain) A Geerlings	6	6
WC	(Spain) L Cortez Llorca	4	2
4	(Spain) M Bassols Ribera	6	3	3
(Malta) F Curmi	3	6	6
(France) C Monnet	2	2
7	(Bulgaria) E Yaneva	6	6

Quarterfinals
1	(Austria) J Grabher	6^{4}	3
WC	(Spain) A Geerlings	7^{7}	6
(Malta) F Curmi	6	4	6
7	(Bulgaria) E Yaneva	1	6	4

Semifinals
WC	(Spain) A Geerlings	6	6
(Malta) F Curmi	2	3

=== Bottom half ===
First round
6	(Slovenia) T Zidanšek	6	6
(Greece) D Papamichail	4	2
(Germany) M Hodzic	4	3
(Germany) J Steur	6	6
(Ukraine) A Sobolieva	2	2
(Spain) A Mintegi del Olmo	6	6
(Switzerland) R Masarova	6	6
3	(Germany) N Noha Akugue	4	3
5	(Spain) A Lázaro García	7^{9}	6
(Morocco) Y Kabbaj	6^{7}	0
(Brazil) L Pigossi	0	4
(Italy) N Brancaccio	6	6
Q	(France) L Nguyen Tan	6	6
(Germany) E Bennemann	4	1
WC	(Spain) A Teixidó García	3	6	3
2	(Czech Republic) L Samson	6	2	6

Second round
6	(Slovenia) T Zidanšek	6	6
(Germany) J Steur	2	1
(Spain) A Mintegi del Olmo	4	7^{7}	3
(Switzerland) R Masarova	6	6^{1}	6
5	(Spain) A Lázaro García	6^{1}	7	6
(Italy) N Brancaccio	7^{7}	5	4
Q	(France) L Nguyen Tan	0	3
2	(Czech Republic) L Samson	6	6

Quarterfinals
6	(Slovenia) T Zidanšek	6	3	6
(Switzerland) R Masarova	4	6	3
5	(Spain) A Lázaro García	0	0^{r}
2	(Czech Republic) L Samson	6	0

Semifinals
6	(Slovenia) T Zidanšek	1	6	3
2	(Czech Republic) L Samson	6	1	6

== Qualifying ==
=== Seeds ===
1. (Bulgaria) Lidia Encheva (qualifying competition, lucky loser)
2. (Bulgaria) Isabella Shinikova (first round)
3. (Bulgaria) Lia Karatancheva (first round)
4. (France) Lucie Nguyen Tan (qualified)
5. (France) Amandine Hesse (first round)
6. (Czech Republic) Aneta Laboutková (first round)
7. (Greece) Sapfo Sakellaridi (first round)
8. (Germany) Marie Vogt (first round)

=== Qualifiers ===
1. (Ukraine) Daria Yesypchuk
2. (Czech Republic) Aneta Kučmová
3. (Germany) Ida Wobker
4. (France) Lucie Nguyen Tan

=== Lucky loser ===
1. (Bulgaria) Lidia Encheva

=== Draw ===
==== First qualifier ====
First round
1	(Bulgaria) Lidia Encheva	6	6
(Switzerland) Marie Mettraux	2	2
(Ukraine) Daria Yesypchuk	6	6
8	(Germany) Marie Vogt	1	1

Qualifying competition
1	(Bulgaria) Lidia Encheva	6	4	4
(Ukraine) Daria Yesypchuk	3	6	6

==== Second qualifier ====
First round
2	(Bulgaria) Isabella Shinikova	1	7^{7}	3
(Czech Republic) Aneta Kučmová	6	6^{1}	6
(Spain) Maria García Cid	6	6
5	(France) Amandine Hesse	1	1

Qualifying competition
(Czech Republic) Aneta Kučmová	4	6	6
(Spain) Maria García Cid	6	4	2

==== Third qualifier ====
First round
3	(Bulgaria) Lia Karatancheva	0	4
(Germany) Ida Wobker	6	6
WC	(Spain) Cristina Díaz Adrover	1	6	6
7	(Greece) Sapfo Sakellaridi	6	4	3

Qualifying competition
(Germany) Ida Wobker	6	6
WC	(Spain) Cristina Díaz Adrover	0	0

==== Fourth qualifier ====
First round
4	(France) Lucie Nguyen Tan	6	6
WC	(Spain) Mireia Sagrista Bermejo	1	4
(Spain) Ruth Roura Llaverías	6	7^{7}
6	(Czech Republic) Aneta Laboutková	0	6^{3}

Qualifying competition
4	(France) Lucie Nguyen Tan	6	4	6
(Spain) Ruth Roura Llaverías	3	6	4
