= 2025 Mallorca Women's Championships – Doubles =

Doubles
- 2025 Mallorca Women's Championships

Final
- Champions: (Czech Republic) Jesika Malečková (Czech Republic) Miriam Škoch
- Runners-up: (Germany) Noma Noha Akugue (Germany) Mariella Thamm
- Score: 6–4, 6–0

Events
Singles	Doubles
Mallorca Women's Championships	· 2026 →

Jesika Malečková and Miriam Škoch won the title, defeating Noma Noha Akugue and Mariella Thamm in the final, 6–4, 6–0.

This was the first edition of the tournament.

== Seeds ==
1. (Czech Republic) Jesika Malečková / (Czech Republic) Miriam Škoch (champions)
2. (Spain) Yvonne Cavallé Reimers / (Italy) Angelica Moratelli (quarterfinals)

== Draw ==
=== Key ===
- Q = Qualifier
- WC = Wild card
- LL = Lucky loser
- Alt = Alternate
- ITF = ITF entry
- PR = Protected ranking
- SR = Special ranking
- SE = Special exempt
- JE = Junior exempt
- JR = Junior Accelerator Programme entrant
- CO = College Accelerator Programme entrant
- NG = Next Gen Accelerator Program entrant
- w/o = Walkover
- r = Retired
- d = Defaulted

=== Draw ===
Quarterfinals
1	(Czech Republic) J Malečková (Czech Republic) M Škoch	6	7^{7}
(Argentina) ML Carlé (Greece) D Papamichail	3	6^{1}
(Georgia (country)) E Gorgodze (Latvia) D Semeņistaja	1^{r}
(Slovenia) D Jakupović (Slovenia) N Radišić	4
(United Kingdom) A Barnett (France) E Lechemia	1	6	[8]
WC	(Germany) N Noha Akugue (Germany) M Thamm	6	0	[10]
(Egypt) M Sherif (Slovenia) T Zidanšek	6^{7}	6	[10]
2	(Spain) Y Cavallé Reimers (Italy) A Moratelli	7^{9}	4	[4]

Semifinals
1	(Czech Republic) J Malečková (Czech Republic) M Škoch	6	6
(Slovenia) D Jakupović (Slovenia) N Radišić	4	0
WC	(Germany) N Noha Akugue (Germany) M Thamm	w/o
(Egypt) M Sherif (Slovenia) T Zidanšek

Final
1	(Czech Republic) J Malečková (Czech Republic) M Škoch	6	6
WC	(Germany) N Noha Akugue (Germany) M Thamm	4	0
