= 2026 BBVA Open Internacional de Valencia =

- Date: 14–20 September
- Edition: 6th
- Category: WTA 125
- Prize money: €100,000
- Surface: Clay
- Location: Valencia, Spain
- Venue: Valencia Tennis Club

Champions

Singles
- (France) Clara Burel

Doubles
- (Slovenia) Dalila Jakupović / (Switzerland) Naïma Karamoko
- Open Internacional de Valencia

The 2026 BBVA Open Internacional de Valencia was a professional women's tennis tournament played on outdoor clay courts. It was the sixth edition of the tournament and part of the 2026 WTA 125 tournaments. It took place at the Sporting Club de Tenis in Valencia, Spain between 14 and 20 September 2026.

== Singles main-draw entrants ==
=== Seeds ===
Country	Player	Rank^{1}	Seed
ESP	Oksana Selekhmeteva	93	1
SLO	Veronika Erjavec	106	2
POL	Katarzyna Kawa	129	3
ESP	Marina Bassols Ribera	133	4
ESP	Andrea Lázaro García	142	5
ESP	Leyre Romero Gormaz	145	6
SUI	Rebeka Masarova	180	7
GRE	Despina Papamichail	188	8

- ^{1} Rankings are as of 31 August 2026.

=== Other entrants ===
The following players received wildcards into the singles main draw:

- (Spain) Lucía Cortez Llorca
- (Spain) Charo Esquiva Bañuls
- (Spain) María García Cid
- (Spain) Carlota Martínez Círez

The following players received entry into the singles main draw through protected ranking:

- (France) Clara Burel
- (Spain) Ariana Geerlings

The following players received entry from the qualifying draw:

- (Germany) Nastasja Schunk
- (United States) Madison Sieg
- (Germany) Joëlle Steur
- (Spain) Aran Teixidó García

=== Withdrawals ===
Before the tournament

- (Austria) Julia Grabher → replaced by (Germany) Eva Bennemann
- (Italy) Federica Urgesi → replaced by (Spain) Alicia Herrero Liñana

During the tournament

- (Italy) Martina Trevisan (left foot injury)

== Doubles entrants ==
=== Seeds ===
Country	Player	Country	Player	Rank^{1}	Seed
SLO	Dalila Jakupović	SUI	Naïma Karamoko	177	1
ESP	Irene Burillo	ARG	Nicole Fossa Huergo	229	2

- ^{1} Rankings as of 7 September 2026.

=== Other entrants ===
The following pair received a wildcard into the doubles main draw:

- (Spain) Charo Esquiva Bañuls / (Spain) Aran Teixidó García

== Champions ==
=== Singles ===
- (France) Clara Burel def. (Spain) Alicia Herrero Liñana 4–6, 6–0, 6–2

=== Doubles ===
- (Slovenia) Dalila Jakupović / (Switzerland) Naïma Karamoko def. (Spain) Irene Burillo / (Argentina) Nicole Fossa Huergo 6–2, 6–3
