= 2021 Columbus Challenger =

Professional tennis tournament

- Date: 20–26 September
- Edition: 10th (men); 1st (women)
- Category: ATP Challenger 80 (men); WTA 125 (women)
- Draw: 32S / 16D
- Prize money: $52,080 (men) $115,000 (women)
- Surface: Hard (Indoor)
- Location: Columbus, United States
- Venue: Ohio State Varsity Tennis Center

Champions

Men's singles
- (United States) Stefan Kozlov

Women's singles
- (Spain) Nuria Párrizas Díaz

Men's doubles
- (United States) Stefan Kozlov / (Canada) Peter Polansky

Women's doubles
- (China) Wang Xinyu / (China) Zheng Saisai
- Columbus Challenger

The 2021 Columbus Challenger was a professional challenger level tennis tournament played on indoor hard courts. It was the tenth edition of the men's tournament which was part of the 2021 ATP Challenger Tour and the first edition of the women's event, that was part of 2021 WTA 125K series. It took place in Columbus, United States between 20 and 26 September 2021.

== Champions ==
=== Men's singles ===
- (United States) Stefan Kozlov def. (Australia) Max Purcell 4–6, 6–2, 6–4.

=== Women's singles ===
- (Spain) Nuria Párrizas Díaz def. (China) Wang Xinyu, 7–6^{(7–2)}, 6–3

=== Men's doubles ===
- (United States) Stefan Kozlov / (Canada) Peter Polansky def. (United States) Andrew Lutschaunig / (Japan) James Trotter 7–5, 7–6^{(7–5)}.

=== Women's doubles ===
- (China) Wang Xinyu / (China) Zheng Saisai def. (Slovenia) Dalila Jakupović / (Spain) Nuria Párrizas Díaz, 6–1, 6–1

== ATP singles main draw entrants ==
=== Seeds ===
Country	Player	Rank^{1}	Seed
USA	Tennys Sandgren	103	1
ITA	Salvatore Caruso	125	2
AUS	Alex Bolt	146	3
IND	Prajnesh Gunneswaran	165	4
TPE	Jason Jung	166	5
USA	Ernesto Escobedo	175	6
USA	J. J. Wolf	178	7
USA	Mitchell Krueger	182	8

- ^{1} Rankings are as of September 13, 2021.

=== Other entrants ===
The following players received entry into the singles main draw as wildcards:

- (United States) Cannon Kingsley
- (United States) James Tracy
- (Czech Republic) Matěj Vocel

The following players received entry into the singles main draw as alternates:

- (United States) Nick Chappell
- (Australia) Dayne Kelly

The following players received entry into the singles main draw from the qualifying draw:

- (Netherlands) Gijs Brouwer
- (South Korea) Chung Yun-seong
- (United States) Evan King
- (United States) Aleksandar Kovacevic

The following players received entry as lucky losers:

- (Canada) Alexis Galarneau
- (Japan) Shintaro Mochizuki

== WTA singles main draw entrants ==
=== Seeds ===
Country	Player	Rank^{1}	Seed
USA	Ann Li	73	1
ESP	Nuria Párrizas Díaz	88	2
USA	Madison Brengle	91	3
CHN	Zheng Saisai	94	4
USA	Lauren Davis	99	5
MEX	Renata Zarazúa	120	6
BRA	Beatriz Haddad Maia	124	7
CHN	Wang Xinyu	130	8

- ^{1} Rankings are as of September 13, 2021.

=== Other entrants ===
The following players received entry into the singles main draw as wildcards:

- (France) Elsa Jacquemot
- (United States) Elvina Kalieva
- (United States) Katrina Scott
- (United States) Peyton Stearns

The following player was accepted directly into the main draw using a protected or a special ranking:

- (Chinese Taipei) Liang En-shuo

The following players received entry into the singles main draw from the qualifying draw:

- (United States) Louisa Chirico
- (United States) Alexa Glatch
- (Australia) Priscilla Hon
- (United States) Danielle Lao

The following player received entry into the singles main draw as a lucky loser:

- (Slovenia) Dalila Jakupović

=== Withdrawals ===
Before the tournament

- (Czech Republic) Marie Bouzková → replaced by (Brazil) Beatriz Haddad Maia
- (United States) Christina McHale → replaced by (Japan) Kurumi Nara
- (United States) Caty McNally → replaced by (United States) Katie Volynets
- (United States) Grace Min → replaced by (United States) Francesca Di Lorenzo
- (Russia) Anna Kalinskaya → replaced by (Slovenia) Dalila Jakupović
- (Ukraine) Kateryna Kozlova → replaced by (United States) Hailey Baptiste
- (United States) Claire Liu → replaced by (United States) Asia Muhammad
- (United Kingdom) Emma Raducanu → replaced by (Canada) Rebecca Marino
- (Croatia) Donna Vekić → replaced by (United States) Jamie Loeb

== WTA doubles main draw entrants ==
=== Seeds ===
Country	Player	Country	Player	Rank^{1}	Seed
USA	Ingrid Neel	USA	Sabrina Santamaria	155	1
NOR	Ulrikke Eikeri	FRA	Elixane Lechemia	175	2
USA	Jamie Loeb	USA	Asia Muhammad	212	3
TPE	Liang En-shuo	CAN	Rebecca Marino	453	4

- Rankings are as of September 13, 2021

=== Other entrants ===
The following pairs received wildcards into the doubles main draw:

- (France) Luna Dormet / (Spain) Lucía Marzal Martínez
- (France) Elsa Jacquemot / (United States) Eleana Yu
