= 2026 Mallorca Women's Championships =

- Date: 12–18 October
- Edition: 2nd
- Category: WTA 125
- Prize money: €100,000
- Surface: Clay
- Location: Mallorca, Spain

Champions

Singles
- (Spain) Ariana Geerlings

Doubles
- (Croatia) Lucija Ćirić Bagarić / (Italy) Angelica Moratelli
- Mallorca Women's Championships

The 2026 Mallorca Women's Championships, also known as Vanda Pharmaceuticals Mallorca Women's Championships, for sponsorship reasons, was a professional women's tennis tournament played on outdoor clay courts. It was the second edition of the tournament and part of the 2026 WTA 125 tournaments. It took place at the Polideportivo Municipal de Magaluf in Mallorca, Spain between 12 and 18 October 2026.

== Singles main-draw entrants ==
=== Seeds ===
Country	Player	Rank^{1}	Seed
AUT	Julia Grabher	99	1
CZE	Laura Samson	113	2
GER	Noma Noha Akugue	130	3
ESP	Marina Bassols Ribera	131	4
ESP	Andrea Lázaro García	137	5
SLO	Tamara Zidanšek	142	6
BUL	Elizara Yaneva	149	7
GEO	Ekaterine Gorgodze	151	8

- ^{1} Rankings are as of 5 October 2026.

=== Other entrants ===
The following players received wildcards into the singles main draw:

- (Spain) Lucía Cortez Llorca
- (Spain) Ariana Geerlings
- (Bosnia and Herzegovina) Tea Kovačević
- (Spain) Aran Teixidó García

The following players received entry from the qualifying draw:

- (Czech Republic) Aneta Kučmová
- (France) Lucie Nguyen Tan
- (Germany) Ida Wobker
- (Ukraine) Daria Yesypchuk

The following player received entry into the main draw as a lucky loser:

- (Bulgaria) Lidia Encheva

=== Withdrawals ===
Before the tournament

- (Sweden) Caijsa Hennemann → replaced by (Bulgaria) Lidia Encheva (LL)
- (Poland) Katarzyna Kawa → replaced by (Italy) Deborah Chiesa
- (Argentina) Solana Sierra → replaced by (Morocco) Yasmine Kabbaj

=== Retirement ===
- (Spain) Andrea Lázaro García

== Doubles entrants ==
=== Seeds ===
Country	Player	Country	Player	Rank	Seed
ESP	Yvonne Cavallé Reimers	BRA	Laura Pigossi	189	1
CRO	Lucija Ćirić Bagarić	ITA	Angelica Moratelli	227	2

- Rankings as of 5 October 2026.

=== Other entrants ===
The following pair received a wildcard into the doubles main draw:

- (Germany) Noma Noha Akugue / (Germany) Joëlle Steur

== Champions ==
=== Singles ===
- (Spain) Ariana Geerlings def. (Czech Republic) Laura Samson 6–2, 6–2

=== Doubles ===
- (Croatia) Lucija Ćirić Bagarić / (Italy) Angelica Moratelli def. (Spain) Yvonne Cavallé Reimers / (Brazil) Laura Pigossi 2–6, 6–3, [12–10]
