= 2025 Antalya Challenger 3 =

- Date: 1–6 April
- Edition: 4th
- Category: WTA 125
- Draw: 32S/16D
- Surface: Clay
- Location: Antalya, Turkey

Champions

Singles
- (Argentina) Solana Sierra

Doubles
- (Hungary) Anna Bondár / (Switzerland) Simona Waltert
- Antalya Challenger

The 2025 Antalya Challenger 3 (also known as the Megasaray Hotels Open 3 for sponsorship reasons) was a professional women's tennis tournament played on outdoor clay courts. It was the fourth edition of the tournament and the third in a series of three WTA 125 tournaments played at the same venue in consecutive weeks in 2025. It took place at the Megasaray Tennis Academy in Antalya, Turkey between 1 and 6 April 2025.

== Singles main-draw entrants ==
=== Seeds ===
Country	Player	Rank^{1}	Seed
HUN	Anna Bondár	94	1
CRO	Petra Martić	112	2
GER	Ella Seidel	123	3
	Anastasia Zakharova	127	4
POL	Maja Chwalińska	131	5
CHN	Xinyu Gao	133	6
FRA	Elsa Jacquemot	141	7
ARG	Solana Sierra	147	8

- ^{1} Rankings as of 17 March 2025.

=== Other entrants ===
The following players received wildcards into the singles main draw:

- (Turkey) Ayla Aksu
- (Turkey) Çağla Büyükakçay
- Anastasiia Gureva
- (Latvia) Adelina Lachinova

The following players received entry from the qualifying draw:

- (Bulgaria) Lia Karatancheva
- (Kazakhstan) Zhibek Kulambayeva
- (Czech Republic) Jesika Malečková
- (Croatia) Tara Würth

The following player received entry as a lucky loser:

- (China) Zheng Wushuang

=== Withdrawals ===
Before the tournament

- (Germany) Tamara Korpatsch → replaced by (China) Zheng Wushuang

=== Retirements ===
During the tournament

- (Romania) Ana Bogdan (breathing difficulty)
- (Ukraine) Anastasiia Sobolieva

== Doubles main-draw entrants ==
=== Seeds ===
Country	Player	Country	Player	Rank^{1}	Seed
ITA	Angelica Moratelli	JPN	Makoto Ninomiya	125	1
	Amina Anshba		Elena Pridankina	184	2
CZE	Jesika Malečková	CZE	Miriam Škoch	221	3
IND	Prarthana Thombare	CHN	Zheng Wushuang	287	4

- Rankings are as of 17 March 2025

=== Other entrants ===
The following pair received a wildcard into the doubles main draw:

- Anastasiia Gureva / Alevtina Ibragimova

== Champions ==
=== Singles ===
- (Argentina) Solana Sierra def. (Spain) Leyre Romero Gormaz 6–3, 6–4

=== Doubles ===
- (Hungary) Anna Bondár / (Switzerland) Simona Waltert def. (United Kingdom) Alicia Barnett / (France) Elixane Lechemia 7–5, 2–6, [10–6]
