= 2025 Antalya Challenger 3 – Doubles =

Doubles
- 2025 Antalya Challenger 3

Final
- Champions: (Hungary) Anna Bondár (Switzerland) Simona Waltert
- Runners-up: (United Kingdom) Alicia Barnett (France) Elixane Lechemia
- Score: 7–5, 2–6, [10–6]

Events
Singles	Doubles
- Antalya Challenger

María Lourdes Carlé and Simona Waltert were the reigning champions, but Carlé chose not to participate.

Waltert partnered Anna Bondár and won the title, defeating Alicia Barnett and Elixane Lechemia 7–5, 2–6, [10–6] in the final.

== Seeds ==
1. (Italy) Angelica Moratelli / (Japan) Makoto Ninomiya (first round)
2. Amina Anshba / Elena Pridankina (quarterfinals)
3. (Czech Republic) Jesika Malečková / (Czech Republic) Miriam Škoch (semifinals)
4. (India) Prarthana Thombare / (China) Zheng Wushuang (quarterfinals)

== Draw ==
Key

- Q = Qualifier
- WC = Wild card
- LL = Lucky loser
- Alt = Alternate
- ITF = ITF entry
- PR = Protected ranking
- SR = Special ranking
- SE = Special exempt
- JE = Junior exempt
- JR = Junior Accelerator Programme entrant
- CO = College Accelerator Programme entrant
- NG = Next Gen Accelerator Program entrant
- w/o = Walkover
- r = Retired
- d = Defaulted

=== Draw ===
First round
1	(Italy) A Moratelli (Japan) M Ninomiya	2	6	[7]
(Kazakhstan) Z Kulambayeva (Switzerland) C Naef	6	4	[10]
(Algeria) I Ibbou (Bosnia and Herzegovina) A Wagner	6	6^{2}	[8]
(United Kingdom) A Barnett (France) E Lechemia	4	7^{7}	[10]
4	(India) P Thombare (China) W Zheng	3	6	[10]
WC	A Gureva; A Ibragimova	6	0	[2]
(Germany) N Noha Akugue (Australia) A Sharma	6	6
(United Kingdom) M Brooks (United Kingdom) F Christie	2	4
(France) E Jacquemot (Argentina) S Sierra	6	7
(United States) M Jones (Australia) A Osborne	3	5
(India) R Bhosale (New Zealand) PM Hourigan	3	3
3	(Czech Republic) J Malečková (Czech Republic) M Škoch	6	6
(Hungary) A Bondár (Switzerland) S Waltert	7^{7}	6
(Bulgaria) L Karatancheva; E Yashina	6^{2}	4
(Slovenia) V Erjavec (Spain) L Romero Gormaz	7	3	[9]
2	A Anshba; E Pridankina	5	6	[11]

Quarterfinals
(Kazakhstan) Z Kulambayeva (Switzerland) C Naef	5	2
(United Kingdom) A Barnett (France) E Lechemia	7	6
4	(India) P Thombare (China) W Zheng	5	6	[11]
(Germany) N Noha Akugue (Australia) A Sharma	7	4	[13]
(France) E Jacquemot (Argentina) S Sierra	1	6^{0}
3	(Czech Republic) J Malečková (Czech Republic) M Škoch	6	7^{7}
(Hungary) A Bondár (Switzerland) S Waltert	6	6
2	A Anshba; E Pridankina	1	2

Semifinals
(United Kingdom) A Barnett (France) E Lechemia	2	6	[10]
(Germany) N Noha Akugue (Australia) A Sharma	6	4	[7]
3	(Czech Republic) J Malečková (Czech Republic) M Škoch	2	6	[2]
(Hungary) A Bondár (Switzerland) S Waltert	6	1	[10]

Final
(United Kingdom) A Barnett (France) E Lechemia	5	6	[6]
(Hungary) A Bondár (Switzerland) S Waltert	7	2	[10]
