= 2025 BBVA Open Internacional de Valencia – Doubles =

Doubles
- 2025 BBVA Open Internacional de Valencia

Final
- Champions: Maria Kozyreva; Iryna Shymanovich
- Runners-up: (Spain) Yvonne Cavallé Reimers (Spain) Ángela Fita Boluda
- Score: 6-3, 6–4

Events
Singles	Doubles
- Open Internacional de Valencia

Maria Kozyreva and Iryna Shymanovich won the title, defeating Yvonne Cavallé Reimers and Ángela Fita Boluda in the final, 6–3, 6–4.

Katarzyna Piter and Fanny Stollár were the reigning champions, but they chose to compete in s'Hertogenbosch instead.

== Seeds ==
1. Maria Kozyreva / Iryna Shymanovich (champions)
2. (United States) Makenna Jones / (Brazil) Laura Pigossi (semifinals)

== Draw ==
Key

- Q = Qualifier
- WC = Wild card
- LL = Lucky loser
- Alt = Alternate
- ITF = ITF entry
- PR = Protected ranking
- SR = Special ranking
- SE = Special exempt
- JE = Junior exempt
- JR = Junior Accelerator Programme entrant
- CO = College Accelerator Programme entrant
- NG = Next Gen Accelerator Program entrant
- w/o = Walkover
- r = Retired
- d = Defaulted

=== Draw ===
Quarterfinals
1	M Kozyreva; I Shymanovich	6	6
(Argentina) ML Carlé (Spain) L Romero Gormaz	2	4
WC	A Korneeva (Argentina) S Sierra	6	6
Alt	A Ibragimova (Bosnia and Herzegovina) A Wagner	4	4
(Georgia (country)) E Gorgodze (Spain) A Herrero Liñana	5	0
(Spain) Y Cavallé Reimers (Spain) Á Fita Boluda	7	6
(Japan) A Ito; E Yashina	3	0
2	(United States) M Jones (Brazil) L Pigossi	6	6

Semifinals
1	M Kozyreva; I Shymanovich	6	6
WC	A Korneeva (Argentina) S Sierra	3	3
(Spain) Y Cavallé Reimers (Spain) Á Fita Boluda	6	6
2	(United States) M Jones (Brazil) L Pigossi	4	3

Final
1	M Kozyreva; I Shymanovich	6	6
(Spain) Y Cavallé Reimers (Spain) Á Fita Boluda	3	4
