= 2021 Columbus Challenger – Men's singles =

Men's singles
- 2021 Columbus Challenger

Final
- Champion: (United States) Stefan Kozlov
- Runner-up: (Australia) Max Purcell
- Score: 4–6, 6–2, 6–4

Events
Singles	men	women
Doubles	men	women
- Columbus Challenger

J. J. Wolf was the defending champion but lost in the semifinals to Stefan Kozlov.

Kozlov won the title after defeating Max Purcell 4–6, 6–2, 6–4 in the final.

== Seeds ==
1. (United States) Tennys Sandgren (quarterfinals)
2. (Italy) Salvatore Caruso (first round, retired)
3. (Australia) Alex Bolt (quarterfinals)
4. (India) Prajnesh Gunneswaran (second round)
5. (Chinese Taipei) Jason Jung (first round)
6. (United States) Ernesto Escobedo (first round)
7. (United States) J. J. Wolf (semifinals)
8. (United States) Mitchell Krueger (first round)

== Draw ==
Key

- Q = Qualifier
- WC = Wild card
- LL = Lucky loser
- Alt = Alternate
- ITF = ITF entry
- PR = Protected ranking
- SR = Special ranking
- SE = Special exempt
- JE = Junior exempt
- JR = Junior Accelerator Programme entrant
- CO = College Accelerator Programme entrant
- NG = Next Gen Accelerator Program entrant
- w/o = Walkover
- r = Retired
- d = Defaulted

=== Finals ===
Semifinals
7	(United States) J. J. Wolf	6	3	5
(United States) Stefan Kozlov	2	6	7
(Australia) Aleksandar Vukic	6^{3}	6^{6}
(Australia) Max Purcell	7^{7}	7^{8}

Final
(United States) Stefan Kozlov	4	6	6
(Australia) Max Purcell	6	2	4

=== Top half ===
First round
1	(United States) T Sandgren	6	6
LL	(Canada) A Galarneau	3	2
Q	(Netherlands) G Brouwer	7^{7}	6
(Barbados) D King	6^{1}	0
(United States) JC Aragone	4	4
Q	(United States) E King	6	6
(India) M Sasikumar	3	2
7	(United States) J. J. Wolf	6	6
4	(India) P Gunneswaran	3	6	7
Q	(United States) A Kovacevic	6	3	5
LL	(Japan) S Mochizuki	3	7^{7}	6^{5}
(Denmark) M Torpegaard	6	6^{3}	7^{7}
(Australia) J Kubler	7^{8}	6
(Canada) P Polansky	6^{6}	4
(United States) S Kozlov	6	6
8	(United States) M Krueger	0	3

Second round
1	(United States) T Sandgren	6	6
Q	(Netherlands) G Brouwer	4	4
Q	(United States) E King	3	0
7	(United States) J. J. Wolf	6	6
4	(India) P Gunneswaran	1	4
(Denmark) M Torpegaard	6	6
(Australia) J Kubler	2	5
(United States) S Kozlov	6	7

Quarterfinals
1	(United States) T Sandgren	3	6	6^{5}
7	(United States) J. J. Wolf	6	3	7^{7}
(Denmark) M Torpegaard	6	6^{4}	4
(United States) S Kozlov	2	7^{7}	6

Semifinals
7	(United States) J. J. Wolf	6	3	5
(United States) S Kozlov	2	6	7

=== Bottom half ===
First round
6	(United States) E Escobedo	4	5
(Australia) A Vukic	6	7
WC	(Czech Republic) M Vocel	7	1	6^{3}
WC	(United States) C Kingsley	5	6	7^{7}
Q	(South Korea) Y-s Chung	6	4	6^{3}
(South Korea) J-s Nam	3	6	7^{7}
(United States) N Rubin	6^{5}	6^{4}
3	(Australia) A Bolt	7^{7}	7^{7}
5	(Chinese Taipei) J Jung	3	4
(United Kingdom) R Peniston	6	6
WC	(United States) J Tracy	3	2
(Australia) M Purcell	6	6
Alt	(United States) N Chappell	0^{r}
(Colombia) N Mejía	5
Alt	(Australia) D Kelly	6	3
2	(Italy) S Caruso	2	0^{r}

Second round
(Australia) A Vukic	7^{7}	7
WC	(United States) C Kingsley	6^{4}	5
(South Korea) J-s Nam	6^{5}	4
3	(Australia) A Bolt	7^{7}	6
(United Kingdom) R Peniston	3	6^{7}
(Australia) M Purcell	6	7^{9}
(Colombia) N Mejía	6	0	6
Alt	(Australia) D Kelly	4	6	2

Quarterfinals
(Australia) A Vukic	7	6
3	(Australia) A Bolt	5	4
(Australia) M Purcell	6	3	6
(Colombia) N Mejía	4	6	0

Semifinals
(Australia) A Vukic	6^{3}	6^{6}
(Australia) M Purcell	7^{7}	7^{8}
