= 2026 BBVA Open Internacional de Valencia – Doubles =

Doubles
- 2026 BBVA Open Internacional de Valencia

Final
- Champions: (Slovenia) Dalila Jakupović (Switzerland) Naïma Karamoko
- Runners-up: (Spain) Irene Burillo (Argentina) Nicole Fossa Huergo
- Score: 6–2, 6–3

Events
Singles	Doubles
- Open Internacional de Valencia

Maria Kozyreva and Iryna Shymanovich were the defending champions, but chose to play in Guadalajara instead with different partners.

Dalila Jakupović and Naïma Karamoko won the title, defeating Irene Burillo and Nicole Fossa Huergo 6–2, 6–3 in the final.

== Seeds ==
1. (Slovenia) Dalila Jakupović / (Switzerland) Naïma Karamoko (champions)
2. (Spain) Irene Burillo / (Argentina) Nicole Fossa Huergo (final)

== Draw ==
Key

- Q = Qualifier
- WC = Wild card
- LL = Lucky loser
- Alt = Alternate
- ITF = ITF entry
- PR = Protected ranking
- SR = Special ranking
- SE = Special exempt
- JE = Junior exempt
- JR = Junior Accelerator Programme entrant
- CO = College Accelerator Programme entrant
- NG = Next Gen Accelerator Program entrant
- w/o = Walkover
- r = Retired
- d = Defaulted

=== Draw ===
Quarterfinals
1	(Slovenia) D Jakupović (Switzerland) N Karamoko	6	7^{7}
(Spain) L Cortez Llorca (Spain) A Herrero Liñana	4	6^{5}
(Spain) L Romero Gormaz (Spain) O Selekhmeteva	6	4	[10]
(United Kingdom) F Christie (United Kingdom) E Silva	2	6	[8]
(Greece) D Papamichail (Netherlands) E Vedder	7	6
WC	(Spain) C Esquiva Bañuls (Spain) A Teixidó García	5	4
(Italy) N Brancaccio (Slovenia) V Erjavec	6	3	[5]
2	(Spain) I Burillo (Argentina) N Fossa Huergo	4	6	[10]

Semifinals
1	(Slovenia) D Jakupović (Switzerland) N Karamoko	6	6
(Spain) L Romero Gormaz (Spain) O Selekhmeteva	2	1
(Greece) D Papamichail (Netherlands) E Vedder	4	2
2	(Spain) I Burillo (Argentina) N Fossa Huergo	6	6

Final
1	(Slovenia) D Jakupović (Switzerland) N Karamoko	6	6
2	(Spain) I Burillo (Argentina) N Fossa Huergo	2	3
