= 2024 BBVA Open Internacional de Valencia – Doubles =

Doubles
- 2024 BBVA Open Internacional de Valencia

Final
- Champions: (Poland) Katarzyna Piter (Hungary) Fanny Stollár
- Runners-up: (Italy) Angelica Moratelli (Mexico) Renata Zarazúa
- Score: 6–1, 4–6, [10–8]

Events
| Singles | Doubles |
- Open Internacional de Valencia

Aliona Bolsova and Andrea Gámiz were the reigning champions, but chose not to defend their title.

Katarzyna Piter and Fanny Stollár won the title, after defeating Angelica Moratelli and Renata Zarazúa in the final, 6–1, 4–6, [10–8].

== Seeds ==
1. Amina Anshba / (Czech Republic) Anastasia Dețiuc (first round)
2. (Poland) Katarzyna Piter / (Hungary) Fanny Stollár (champions)

== Draw ==
Key

- Q = Qualifier
- WC = Wild card
- LL = Lucky loser
- Alt = Alternate
- ITF = ITF entry
- PR = Protected ranking
- SR = Special ranking
- SE = Special exempt
- JE = Junior exempt
- JR = Junior Accelerator Programme entrant
- CO = College Accelerator Programme entrant
- NG = Next Gen Accelerator Program entrant
- w/o = Walkover
- r = Retired
- d = Defaulted

=== Draw ===
Quarterfinals
1 | A Anshba (Czech Republic) A Dețiuc | 5 | 7 | [2]
(Italy) A Moratelli (Mexico) R Zarazúa | 7 | 5 | [10]
(Spain) Y Cavallé Reimers (Spain) L Romero Gormaz | 6 | 6
A Fomina-Klotz (Germany) V Heisen | 4 | 4
Alt | (Australia) S Mendez; E Yashina | 6 | 6
WC | (Spain) C Esquiva Bañuls (Spain) Á Fita Boluda | 4 | 3
(United States) V Lepchenko (Ukraine) K Zavatska | 3 | 2
2 | (Poland) K Piter (Hungary) F Stollár | 6 | 6

Semifinals
(Italy) A Moratelli (Mexico) R Zarazúa | 7^{7} | 6^{5} | [10]
(Spain) Y Cavallé Reimers (Spain) L Romero Gormaz | 6^{2} | 7^{7} | [7]
Alt | (Australia) S Mendez; E Yashina | 2 | 6 | [6]
2 | (Poland) K Piter (Hungary) F Stollár | 6 | 1 | [10]

Final
(Italy) Angelica Moratelli (Mexico) Renata Zarazúa | 1 | 6 | [8]
2 | (Poland) Katarzyna Piter (Hungary) Fanny Stollár | 6 | 4 | [10]
