= 2025 Antalya Challenger 3 – Singles =

Singles
- 2025 Antalya Challenger 3

Final
- Champion: (Argentina) Solana Sierra
- Runner-up: (Spain) Leyre Romero Gormaz
- Score: 6–3, 6–4

Events
Singles	Doubles
- Antalya Challenger

Olga Danilović was the defending champion, but chose not to participate this year.

Solana Sierra won the title, defeating Leyre Romero Gormaz in the final, 6–3, 6–4.

== Seeds ==
1. (Hungary) Anna Bondár (quarterfinals)
2. (Croatia) Petra Martić (first round)
3. (Germany) Ella Seidel (first round)
4. Anastasia Zakharova (first round)
5. (Poland) Maja Chwalińska (first round)
6. (China) Gao Xinyu (second round)
7. (France) Elsa Jacquemot (second round)
8. (Argentina) Solana Sierra (champion)

== Draw ==
Key

- Q = Qualifier
- WC = Wild card
- LL = Lucky loser
- Alt = Alternate
- ITF = ITF entry
- PR = Protected ranking
- SR = Special ranking
- SE = Special exempt
- JE = Junior exempt
- JR = Junior Accelerator Programme entrant
- CO = College Accelerator Programme entrant
- NG = Next Gen Accelerator Program entrant
- w/o = Walkover
- r = Retired
- d = Defaulted

=== Finals ===
Semifinals
8	(Argentina) Solana Sierra	6	6
(Australia) Astra Sharma	1	0
Q	(Croatia) Tara Würth	3	0
(Spain) Leyre Romero Gormaz	6	6

Final
8	(Argentina) Solana Sierra	6	6
(Spain) Leyre Romero Gormaz	3	4

=== Top half ===
First round
1	(Hungary) A Bondár	6	3	6
(Switzerland) C Naef	2	6	3
(Germany) M Barthel	6	6
Q	(Kazakhstan) Z Kulambayeva	4	1
(Romania) A Bogdan	1	0^{r}
E Makarova	6	2
T Prozorova	0	7^{7}	4
8	(Argentina) S Sierra	6	6^{5}	6
4	A Zakharova	6	6^{2}	3
(Slovenia) T Zidanšek	2	7^{7}	6
(Slovenia) V Erjavec	6^{1}	6^{4}
Q	(Bulgaria) L Karatancheva	7^{7}	7^{7}
(Australia) A Sharma	3	6	6
(Thailand) L Tararudee	6	2	2
WC	A Gureva	2	2
6	(China) X Gao	6	6

Second round
1	(Hungary) A Bondár	6	6
(Germany) M Barthel	4	3
E Makarova	6	1	2
8	(Argentina) S Sierra	0	6	6
(Slovenia) T Zidanšek	6	2	6^{0}
Q	(Bulgaria) L Karatancheva	2	6	7^{7}
(Australia) A Sharma	6	6
6	(China) X Gao	2	0

Quarterfinals
1	(Hungary) A Bondár	4	2
8	(Argentina) S Sierra	6	6
Q	(Bulgaria) L Karatancheva	3	4
(Australia) A Sharma	6	6

Semifinals
8	(Argentina) S Sierra	6	6
(Australia) A Sharma	1	0

=== Bottom half ===
First round
5	(Poland) M Chwalińska	6	6^{3}	2
LL	(China) W Zheng	4	7^{7}	6
WC	(Turkey) Ç Büyükakçay	4	0
(Ukraine) A Sobolieva	6	6
(Germany) N Noha Akugue	3	4
E Pridankina	6	6
Q	(Croatia) T Würth	5	6	6
3	(Germany) E Seidel	7	3	4
7	(France) E Jacquemot	6	6
Q	(Czech Republic) J Malečková	2	1
(Switzerland) S Waltert	6	6
WC	(Latvia) A Lachinova	1	2
(Turkey) İ Öz	3	0
(Spain) L Romero Gormaz	6	6
WC	(Turkey) A Aksu	7^{7}	2	6
2	(Croatia) P Martić	6^{5}	6	1

Second round
LL	(China) W Zheng	3	6	3
(Ukraine) A Sobolieva	6	3	0^{r}
E Pridankina	7^{7}	4	1
Q	(Croatia) T Würth	6^{5}	6	6
7	(France) E Jacquemot	0	6	2
(Switzerland) S Waltert	6	4	6
(Spain) L Romero Gormaz	7	2	6
WC	(Turkey) A Aksu	5	6	4

Quarterfinals
LL	(China) W Zheng	4	2
Q	(Croatia) T Würth	6	6
(Switzerland) S Waltert	6^{4}	4
(Spain) L Romero Gormaz	7^{7}	6

Semifinals
Q	(Croatia) T Würth	3	0
(Spain) L Romero Gormaz	6	6

== Qualifying ==
=== Seeds ===
1. (Croatia) Lucija Ćirić Bagarić (first round)
2. (China) Zheng Wushuang (qualifying competition, retired, lucky loser)
3. (Croatia) Tara Würth (qualified)
4. (Poland) Gina Feistel (first round, retired)
5. (Kazakhstan) Zhibek Kulambayeva (qualified)
6. (Slovakia) Nina Vargová (qualifying competition)
7. (Germany) Nastasja Schunk (first round)
8. Daria Lodikova (withdrew)

=== Qualifiers ===
1. (Czech Republic) Jesika Malečková
2. (Kazakhstan) Zhibek Kulambayeva
3. (Croatia) Tara Würth
4. (Bulgaria) Lia Karatancheva

=== Lucky loser ===
1. (China) Zheng Wushuang

=== Qualifying draw ===
==== First qualifier ====
First round
1	(Croatia) Lucija Ćirić Bagarić	3	0
(Czech Republic) Jesika Malečková	6	6
WC	Vlada Guryleva	1	5
Alt	Amina Anshba	6	7

Qualifying competition
(Czech Republic) Jesika Malečková	6	6
Alt	Amina Anshba	2	1

==== Second qualifier ====
First round
2	(China) Zheng Wushuang	6	6
(Italy) Sofia Rocchetti	2	4
Alevtina Ibragimova	1	5
5	(Kazakhstan) Zhibek Kulambayeva	6	7

Qualifying competition
2	(China) Zheng Wushuang	7^{7}	5^{r}
5	(Kazakhstan) Zhibek Kulambayeva	6^{4}	6

==== Third qualifier ====
First round
3	(Croatia) Tara Würth	6	6
Ekaterina Ovcharenko	3	2
(Turkey) İlay Yörük	2	2
6	(Slovakia) Nina Vargová	6	6

Qualifying competition
3	(Croatia) Tara Würth	6	3	7
6	(Slovakia) Nina Vargová	4	6	5

==== Fourth qualifier ====
First round
4	(Poland) Gina Feistel	0^{r}
WC	(Turkey) Defne Çırpanlı	5
(Bulgaria) Lia Karatancheva	7^{7}	6
7	(Germany) Nastasja Schunk	6^{4}	1

Qualifying competition
WC	(Turkey) Defne Çırpanlı	3	3
(Bulgaria) Lia Karatancheva	6	6
