= 2026 Mallorca Women's Championships – Doubles =

Doubles
- 2026 Mallorca Women's Championships

Final
- Champions: (Croatia) Lucija Ćirić Bagarić (Italy) Angelica Moratelli
- Runners-up: (Spain) Yvonne Cavallé Reimers (Brazil) Laura Pigossi
- Score: 2–6, 6–3, [12–10]

Details
- Draw: 8
- Seeds: 2

Events
Singles	Doubles
- Mallorca Women's Championships

Jesika Malečková and Miriam Škoch were the reigning champions, but chose not to participate.

Lucija Ćirić Bagarić and Angelica Moratelli won the title, after defeating Yvonne Cavallé Reimers and Laura Pigossi 2–6, 6–3, [12–10] in the final.

== Seeds ==
1. (Spain) Yvonne Cavallé Reimers / (Brazil) Laura Pigossi (final)
2. (Croatia) Lucija Ćirić Bagarić / (Italy) Angelica Moratelli (champions)

== Draw ==
Key

- Q = Qualifier
- WC = Wild card
- LL = Lucky loser
- Alt = Alternate
- ITF = ITF entry
- PR = Protected ranking
- SR = Special ranking
- SE = Special exempt
- JE = Junior exempt
- JR = Junior Accelerator Programme entrant
- CO = College Accelerator Programme entrant
- NG = Next Gen Accelerator Program entrant
- w/o = Walkover
- r = Retired
- d = Defaulted

=== Draw ===
Quarterfinals
1	(Spain) Y Cavallé Reimers (Brazil) L Pigossi	6	5	[10]
(France) E Cascino (Bulgaria) L Karatancheva	3	7	[8]
WC	(Germany) N Noha Akugue (Germany) J Steur	6	6
(Ukraine) A Sobolieva (Bulgaria) E Yaneva	1	2
(Argentina) N Fossa Huergo (France) C Monnet	6	3	[10]
(Czech Republic) A Kučmová (Czech Republic) A Laboutková	3	6	[8]
(Romania) O Gavrilă (Greece) S Sakellaridi	1	1
2	(Croatia) L Ćirić Bagarić (Italy) A Moratelli	6	6

Semifinals
1	(Spain) Y Cavallé Reimers (Brazil) L Pigossi	4	6	[11]
WC	(Germany) N Noha Akugue (Germany) J Steur	6	4	[9]
(Argentina) N Fossa Huergo (France) C Monnet	6	4	[9]
2	(Croatia) L Ćirić Bagarić (Italy) A Moratelli	4	6	[11]

Final
1	(Spain) Y Cavallé Reimers (Brazil) L Pigossi	6	3	[10]
2	(Croatia) L Ćirić Bagarić (Italy) A Moratelli	2	6	[12]
