= 2021 Columbus Challenger – Women's doubles =

Women's doubles
- 2021 Columbus Challenger

Final
- Champions: (China) Wang Xinyu (China) Zheng Saisai
- Runners-up: (Slovenia) Dalila Jakupović (Spain) Nuria Párrizas Díaz
- Score: 6–1, 6–1

Events
Singles	men	women
Doubles	men	women
Columbus Challenger	· 2022 →

This was the first edition of the women's event.

Wang Xinyu and Zheng Saisai won the title, defeating Dalila Jakupović and Nuria Párrizas Díaz in the final, 6–1, 6–1.

== Seeds ==
All seeds received a bye into the quarterfinals, along with one other team.

1. (United States) Ingrid Neel / (United States) Sabrina Santamaria (quarterfinals)
2. (Norway) Ulrikke Eikeri / (France) Elixane Lechemia (semifinals)
3. (United States) Jamie Loeb / (United States) Asia Muhammad (quarterfinals, withdrew)
4. (Chinese Taipei) Liang En-shuo / (Canada) Rebecca Marino (semifinals)

== Draw ==
=== Key ===
- Q = Qualifier
- WC = Wild card
- LL = Lucky loser
- Alt = Alternate
- SE = Special exempt
- PR = Protected ranking
- ITF = ITF entry
- JE = Junior exempt
- w/o = Walkover
- r = Retired
- d = Defaulted
- SR = Special ranking

=== Draw ===
First round
WC	(France) E Jacquemot (United States) E Yu	6	6
(Chile) B Gatica (Brazil) R Pereira	1	3
(Slovenia) D Jakupović (Spain) N Párrizas Díaz	6	6
WC	(France) L Dormet (Spain) L Marzal Martínez	3	1
(Georgia (country)) M Bolkvadze (Mexico) R Zarazúa	3	3
(Australia) M Inglis (Japan) K Okamura	6	6

Quarterfinals
1	(United States) I Neel (United States) S Santamaria	3	2
(China) Xin Wang (China) S Zheng	6	6
4	(Chinese Taipei) E-s Liang (Canada) R Marino	6	6
WC	(France) E Jacquemot (United States) E Yu	0	4
(Slovenia) D Jakupović (Spain) N Párrizas Díaz	w/o
3	(United States) J Loeb (United States) A Muhammad
(Australia) M Inglis (Japan) K Okamura	3	4
2	(Norway) U Eikeri (France) E Lechemia	6	6

Semifinals
(China) Xin Wang (China) S Zheng	2	6	[10]
4	(Chinese Taipei) E-s Liang (Canada) R Marino	6	2	[8]
(Slovenia) D Jakupović (Spain) N Párrizas Díaz	6	2	[10]
2	(Norway) U Eikeri (France) E Lechemia	3	6	[5]

Final
(China) Xin Wang (China) S Zheng	6	6
(Slovenia) D Jakupović (Spain) N Párrizas Díaz	1	1
