= 2021 Columbus Challenger – Men's doubles =

Men's doubles
- 2021 Columbus Challenger

Final
- Champions: (United States) Stefan Kozlov (Canada) Peter Polansky
- Runners-up: (United States) Andrew Lutschaunig (Japan) James Trotter
- Score: 7–5, 7–6^{(7–5)}

Events
Singles	men	women
Doubles	men	women
← 2020 ·	Columbus Challenger	· 2022 →

Treat Huey and Nathaniel Lammons were the defending champions but chose not to defend their title.

Stefan Kozlov and Peter Polansky won the title after defeating Andrew Lutschaunig and James Trotter 7–5, 7–6^{(7–5)} in the final.

== Seeds ==
1. (United States) Robert Galloway / (United States) Alex Lawson (semifinals)
2. (United States) Evan King / (United States) Jackson Withrow (quarterfinals)
3. (United States) Christian Harrison / (United States) Dennis Novikov (first round)
4. (South Korea) Nam Ji-sung / (South Korea) Song Min-kyu (quarterfinals)

== Draw ==
=== Key ===
- Q = Qualifier
- WC = Wild card
- LL = Lucky loser
- Alt = Alternate
- SE = Special exempt
- PR = Protected ranking
- ITF = ITF entry
- JE = Junior exempt
- w/o = Walkover
- r = Retired
- d = Defaulted
- SR = Special ranking

First round
1	(United States) R Galloway (United States) A Lawson	6	6
(Barbados) D King (South Africa) R Roelofse	3	4
WC	(United States) C Kingsley (United States) Jake Van Emburgh	1	3
(Canada) A Galarneau (United States) A Kovacevic	6	6
4	(South Korea) J-s Nam (South Korea) M-k Song	6	3	[10]
(United States) JC Aragone (Colombia) N Barrientos	2	6	[4]
(Netherlands) G Brouwer (United States) R Stalder	5	6	[7]
(United States) S Kozlov (Canada) P Polansky	7	4	[10]
(Colombia) N Mejía (United States) M Mmoh
(United States) W Blumberg (United States) M Schnur	w/o
(South Korea) Y-s Chung (South Korea) S-c Hong	5	7	[15]
3	(United States) C Harrison (United States) D Novikov	7	5	[13]
WC	(United States) Andrew Lutschaunig (Japan) J Trotter	w/o
WC	(Canada) J Boulais (United States) R Cash
(Australia) T Fancutt (Australia) J Kubler	6	2	[8]
2	(United States) E King (United States) J Withrow	4	6	[10]

Quarterfinals
1	(United States) R Galloway (United States) A Lawson	6	6
(Canada) A Galarneau (United States) A Kovacevic	4	4
4	(South Korea) J-s Nam (South Korea) M-k Song	3	7^{8}	[6]
(United States) S Kozlov (Canada) P Polansky	6	6^{6}	[10]
(United States) W Blumberg (United States) M Schnur	6^{5}	6	[8]
(South Korea) Y-s Chung (South Korea) S-c Hong	7^{7}	4	[10]
WC	(United States) A Lutschaunig (Japan) J Trotter	7^{7}	5	[10]
2	(United States) E King (United States) J Withrow	6^{4}	7	[7]

Semifinals
1	(United States) R Galloway (United States) A Lawson	5	6	[2]
(United States) S Kozlov (Canada) P Polansky	7	3	[10]
(South Korea) Y-s Chung (South Korea) S-c Hong	2	4
WC	(United States) A Lutschaunig (Japan) J Trotter	6	6

Final
(United States) S Kozlov (Canada) P Polansky	7	7^{7}
WC	(United States) A Lutschaunig (Japan) J Trotter	5	6^{5}
