= 2021 Columbus Challenger – Women's singles =

Women's singles
- 2021 Columbus Challenger

Final
- Champion: (Spain) Nuria Párrizas Díaz
- Runner-up: (China) Wang Xinyu
- Score: 7–6^{(7–2)}, 6–3

Events
Singles	men	women
Doubles	men	women
Columbus Challenger	· 2022 →

This was the first edition of the women's event.

Nuria Párrizas Díaz won the title, defeating Wang Xinyu in the final, 7–6^{(7–2)}, 6–3.

== Seeds ==
1. (United States) Ann Li (quarterfinals)
2. (Spain) Nuria Párrizas Díaz (champion)
3. (United States) Madison Brengle (quarterfinals)
4. (China) Zheng Saisai (semifinals)
5. (United States) Lauren Davis (quarterfinals)
6. (Mexico) Renata Zarazúa (second round)
7. (Brazil) Beatriz Haddad Maia (quarterfinals)
8. (China) Wang Xinyu (final)

== Draw ==
=== Key ===
- Q = Qualifier
- WC = Wild card
- LL = Lucky loser
- Alt = Alternate
- SE = Special exempt
- PR = Protected ranking
- ITF = ITF entry
- JE = Junior exempt
- w/o = Walkover
- r = Retired
- d = Defaulted
- SR = Special ranking

=== Finals ===
Semifinals
(United States) CoCo Vandeweghe	6^{3}	2
8	(China) Wang Xinyu	7^{7}	6
4	(China) Zheng Saisai	7	3	4
2	(Spain) Nuria Párrizas Díaz	5	6	6

Final
8	(China) Wang Xinyu	6^{2}	3
2	(Spain) Nuria Párrizas Díaz	7^{7}	6

=== Top half ===
First round
1	(United States) A Li	6	6
(Australia) L Cabrera	2	2
(Canada) R Marino	5	4
(United Kingdom) H Dart	7	6
(United States) C Vandeweghe	6	6
WC	(United States) P Stearns	2	4
(United States) C Dolehide	4	6	6^{8}
6	(Mexico) R Zarazúa	6	1	7^{10}
3	(United States) M Brengle	6	4
Q	(United States) D Lao	1	0^{r}
(Australia) M Inglis	3	6	2
Q	(United States) L Chirico	6	1	6
(Georgia (country)) M Bolkvadze	6	7
(Japan) K Nara	2	5
PR	(Chinese Taipei) E-s Liang	6	3	4
8	(China) Xin Wang	2	6	6

Second round
1	(United States) A Li	7^{7}	6
(United Kingdom) H Dart	6^{4}	3
(United States) C Vandeweghe	6	6
6	(Mexico) R Zarazúa	4	3
3	(United States) M Brengle	6	6
Q	(United States) L Chirico	4	4
(Georgia (country)) M Bolkvadze	6	2	3
8	(China) Xin Wang	2	6	6

Quarterfinals
1	(United States) A Li	4	4
(United States) C Vandeweghe	6	6
3	(United States) M Brengle	3	3
8	(China) Xin Wang	6	6

Semifinals
(United States) C Vandeweghe	6^{3}	2
8	(China) Xin Wang	7^{7}	6

=== Bottom half ===
First round
5	(United States) L Davis	6^{5}	6	6
(United States) UM Arconada	7^{7}	3	3
WC	(United States) K Scott	3	6	6^{5}
(United States) K Volynets	6	2	7^{7}
WC	(France) E Jacquemot	6	4	4
Q	(United States) A Glatch	3	6	6
(United States) A Muhammad	7^{7}	3	6^{0}
4	(China) S Zheng	6^{4}	6	7^{7}
7	(Brazil) B Haddad Maia	6^{5}	6	6
LL	(Slovenia) D Jakupović	7^{7}	2	4
Q	(Australia) P Hon	6	6
(United States) F Di Lorenzo	4	4
(United States) J Loeb	1	3
(United States) H Baptiste	6	6
WC	(United States) E Kalieva	2	2
2	(Spain) N Párrizas Díaz	6	6

Second round
5	(United States) L Davis	6	7^{8}
(United States) K Volynets	2	6^{6}
Q	(United States) A Glatch	6	4	3
4	(China) S Zheng	4	6	6
7	(Brazil) B Haddad Maia	7^{7}	6
Q	(Australia) P Hon	6^{4}	3
(United States) H Baptiste	2	3
2	(Spain) N Párrizas Díaz	6	6

Quarterfinals
5	(United States) L Davis	6	2	2
4	(China) S Zheng	1	6	6
7	(Brazil) B Haddad Maia	6^{3}	6	2
2	(Spain) N Párrizas Díaz	7^{7}	3	6

Semifinals
4	(China) S Zheng	7	3	4
2	(Spain) N Párrizas Díaz	5	6	6

== Qualifying ==
=== Seeds ===
1. (Australia) Priscilla Hon (qualified)
2. (Japan) Mai Hontama (qualifying competition)
3. (United States) Alycia Parks (first round)
4. (United States) Whitney Osuigwe (first round)
5. (United States) Danielle Lao (qualified)
6. (Slovenia) Dalila Jakupović (qualifying competition, lucky loser)
7. (United States) Alexa Glatch (qualified)
8. (Norway) Ulrikke Eikeri (qualifying competition)

=== Qualifiers ===
1. (Australia) Priscilla Hon
2. (United States) Alexa Glatch
3. (United States) Louisa Chirico
4. (United States) Danielle Lao

=== Lucky loser ===
1. (Slovenia) Dalila Jakupović

=== Draw ===
==== First qualifier ====
First round
1	(Australia) Priscilla Hon	6	6
(Brazil) Rebeca Pereira	2	0
(Chile) Bárbara Gatica	0	2
6	(Slovenia) Dalila Jakupović	6	6

Qualifying competition
1	(Australia) Priscilla Hon	6	6
6	(Slovenia) Dalila Jakupović	3	4

==== Second qualifier ====
First round
2	(Japan) Mai Hontama	7^{7}	6
(United States) Eleana Yu	6^{4}	2
WC	(Germany) Irina Cantos Siemers	5	4
7	(United States) Alexa Glatch	7	6

Qualifying competition
2	(Japan) Mai Hontama	2	3
7	(United States) Alexa Glatch	6	6

==== Third qualifier ====
First round
3	(United States) Alycia Parks	7^{7}	1	6^{4}
PR	(United States) Louisa Chirico	6^{4}	6	7^{7}
WC	(Spain) Lucía Marzal Martínez	1	3
8	(Norway) Ulrikke Eikeri	6	6

Qualifying competition
PR	(United States) Louisa Chirico	6	5	6
8	(Norway) Ulrikke Eikeri	2	7	3

==== Fourth qualifier ====
First round
4	(United States) Whitney Osuigwe	1	2
PR	(United States) Victoria Duval	6	6
(Japan) Kyōka Okamura	6^{2}	4
5	(United States) Danielle Lao	7^{7}	6

Qualifying competition
PR	(United States) Victoria Duval	4	3
5	(United States) Danielle Lao	6	6
