= 2025 Mallorca Women's Championships – Singles =

Singles
- 2025 Mallorca Women's Championships

Final
- Champion: (Argentina) Solana Sierra
- Runner-up: (Serbia) Lola Radivojević
- Score: 6–3, 6–1

Events
Singles	Doubles
- Mallorca Women's Championships

This was the first edition of the tournament.

Solana Sierra won the title, defeating Lola Radivojević in the final, 6–3, 6–1.

== Seeds ==
1. (Argentina) Solana Sierra (champion)
2. (Egypt) Mayar Sherif (second round)
3. (Latvia) Darja Semeņistaja (second round)
4. (Hungary) Panna Udvardy (first round)
5. (Czech Republic) Sára Bejlek (quarterfinals, withdrew)
6. Oksana Selekhmeteva (second round)
7. (Netherlands) Arantxa Rus (first round)
8. (Argentina) María Lourdes Carlé (quarterfinals)

== Draw ==
Key

- Q = Qualifier
- WC = Wild card
- LL = Lucky loser
- Alt = Alternate
- ITF = ITF entry
- PR = Protected ranking
- SR = Special ranking
- SE = Special exempt
- JE = Junior exempt
- JR = Junior Accelerator Programme entrant
- CO = College Accelerator Programme entrant
- NG = Next Gen Accelerator Program entrant
- w/o = Walkover
- r = Retired
- d = Defaulted

=== Finals ===
Semifinals
1	(Argentina) Solana Sierra	6	7
(Spain) Andrea Lázaro García	2	5
(Serbia) Lola Radivojević	7^{7}	6
Q	(Serbia) Teodora Kostović	6^{3}	3

Final
1	(Argentina) Solana Sierra	6	6
(Serbia) Lola Radivojević	3	1

=== Top half ===
First round
1	(Argentina) S Sierra	6	6
Q	(Italy) D Spiteri	4	1
(Spain) G Maristany	6	6
(Spain) I Burillo	3	4
(Georgia (country)) E Gorgodze	6	4	6
(Greece) D Papamichail	2	6	3
WC	(Germany) J Stusek	2	1
6	O Selekhmeteva	6	6
3	(Latvia) D Semeņistaja	6	6
LL	(Ukraine) Y Kotliar	1	1
(Spain) A Lázaro García	6	6
(Slovenia) T Zidanšek	3	0
WC	(Spain) C Diaz Adrover	1	6	2
LL	(Czech Republic) A Kučmová	6	1	6
Q	(Germany) M Hodzic	5	7	6^{6}
5	(Czech Republic) S Bejlek	7	5	7^{8}

Second round
1	(Argentina) S Sierra	7	6
(Spain) G Maristany	5	4
(Georgia (country)) E Gorgodze	6	3	6
6	O Selekhmeteva	3	6	4
3	(Latvia) D Semeņistaja	4	6	5
(Spain) A Lázaro García	6	3	7
LL	(Czech Republic) A Kučmová	2	2
5	(Czech Republic) S Bejlek	6	6

Quarterfinals
1	(Argentina) S Sierra	3	6	6
(Georgia (country)) E Gorgodze	6	0	1
(Spain) A Lázaro García	w/o
5	(Czech Republic) S Bejlek

Semifinals
1	(Argentina) S Sierra	6	7
(Spain) A Lázaro García	2	5

=== Bottom half ===
First round
7	(Netherlands) A Rus	2	2
(Ukraine) O Oliynykova	6	6
(Serbia) L Radivojević	6	6
(Romania) M Bulgaru	4	3
Q	(France) C Monnet	6	6
(Germany) M Barthel	1	4
WC	(Germany) N Noha Akugue	6	6
4	(Hungary) P Udvardy	4	1
8	(Argentina) ML Carlé	6	6
(Czech Republic) B Palicová	4	4
(Italy) N Brancaccio	7^{7}	6
(Canada) C Branstine	6^{0}	3
(Germany) C Werner	3	3
Q	(Serbia) T Kostović	6	6
WC	(Germany) M Thamm	0	0
2	(Egypt) M Sherif	6	6

Second round
(Ukraine) O Oliynykova	3	4
(Serbia) L Radivojević	6	6
Q	(France) C Monnet	4	6	6^{1}
WC	(Germany) N Noha Akugue	6	4	7^{7}
8	(Argentina) ML Carlé	7^{7}	1	7
(Italy) N Brancaccio	6^{5}	6	5
Q	(Serbia) T Kostović	6	6
2	(Egypt) M Sherif	3	4

Quarterfinals
(Serbia) L Radivojević	6	7
WC	(Germany) N Noha Akugue	0	5
8	(Argentina) ML Carlé	4	2
Q	(Serbia) T Kostović	6	6

Semifinals
(Serbia) L Radivojević	7^{7}	6
Q	(Serbia) T Kostović	6^{3}	3

== Qualifying ==
=== Seeds ===
1. (France) Carole Monnet (qualified)
2. (Serbia) Teodora Kostović (qualified)
3. (Spain) Marina Bassols Ribera (withdrew)
4. (Germany) Tessa Johanna Brockmann (first round)
5. (Italy) Dalila Spiteri (qualified)
6. Ekaterina Kazionova (qualifying competition)
7. (Czech Republic) Aneta Kučmová (qualifying competition, lucky loser)
8. (Germany) Mina Hodzic (qualified)

=== Qualifiers ===
1. (France) Carole Monnet
2. (Serbia) Teodora Kostović
3. (Italy) Dalila Spiteri
4. (Germany) Mina Hodzic

=== Lucky losers ===
1. (Czech Republic) Aneta Kučmová
2. (Ukraine) Yelyzaveta Kotliar

=== Qualifying draw ===
==== First qualifier ====
First round
1	(France) Carole Monnet	6	6
WC	(Germany) Maxine Kammerer	0	0
WC	(Bosnia and Herzegovina) Tea Kovačević	2	4
7	(Czech Republic) Aneta Kučmová	6	6

Qualifying competition
1	(France) Carole Monnet	4	6	6
7	(Czech Republic) Aneta Kučmová	6	2	0

==== Second qualifier ====
First round
2	(Serbia) Teodora Kostović	6	6
WC	(Spain) Mireia Sagrista Bermejo	3	1
(China) Liu Min	0	1
6	Ekaterina Kazionova	6	6

Qualifying competition
2	(Serbia) Teodora Kostović	6	6
6	Ekaterina Kazionova	2	1

==== Third qualifier ====
First round				Qualifying competition
					(Sweden) Fanny Norin	2	1
				5	(Italy) Dalila Spiteri	6	6
WC	(Spain) Yvonne Cavallé Reimers	0	5	5	(Italy) Dalila Spiteri	6	6
5	(Italy) Dalila Spiteri	6	7

==== Fourth qualifier ====
First round
4	(Germany) Tessa Johanna Brockmann	3	1
(Ukraine) Yelyzaveta Kotliar	6	6
WC	(Ukraine) Maryna Kolb	1	4
8	(Germany) Mina Hodzic	6	6

Qualifying competition
(Ukraine) Yelyzaveta Kotliar	3	6^{7}
8	(Germany) Mina Hodzic	6	7^{9}
