= Mallorca Women's Championships =

- 2026 Mallorca Women's Championships

Tournament information
- Event name: Vanda Pharmaceuticals Mallorca Women's Championships presented by ecotrans Group
- Location: Mallorca, Spain
- Venue: Mallorca Country Club
- Category: WTA 125
- Surface: Clay
- Draw: 32S/16Q/8D
- Prize money: €100,000
- Website: Official Website

Current champions (2026)
- Singles: (Spain) Ariana Geerlings
- Doubles: (Croatia) Lucija Ćirić Bagarić (Italy) Angelica Moratelli

The Mallorca Women's Championships is a tournament for professional female tennis players played on outdoor clay courts. The event is classified as a WTA 125 tournament and is held at the Mallorca Country Club in Mallorca, Spain. The tournament announced former tennis player, Gabriela Sabatini as the ambassador for the event. This is the third international tennis event to take place in Mallorca after the ATP and WTA organized a 250 level event on grass at the same venue and at the ATP Challenger level with the Rafa Nadal Open also held in Mallorca.

== Past finals ==
=== Singles ===
Year	Champion	Runners-up	Score
2026	(Spain) Ariana Geerlings	(Czech Republic) Laura Samson	6–2, 6–2
2025	(Argentina) Solana Sierra	(Serbia) Lola Radivojević	6–3, 6–1

=== Doubles ===
Year	Champions	Runners-up	Score
2026	(Croatia) Lucija Ćirić Bagarić (Italy) Angelica Moratelli	(Spain) Yvonne Cavallé Reimers (Brazil) Laura Pigossi	2–6, 6–3, [12–10]
2025	(Czech Republic) Jesika Malečková (Czech Republic) Miriam Škoch	(Germany) Noma Noha Akugue (Germany) Mariella Thamm	6–4, 6–0
