= Open Internacional de Valencia =

- 2026 BBVA Open Internacional de Valencia

WTA 125
- Event name: Open Internacional de Valencia
- Location: Valencia, Spain
- Venue: Club de Tenis Sporting
- Category: WTA 125
- Surface: Clay
- Draw: 32S/16Q/8D
- Prize money: €100,000
- Website: www.openinternacionalvalencia.com

Current champions (2026)
- Singles: (France) Clara Burel
- Doubles: (Slovenia) Dalila Jakupović (Switzerland) Naïma Karamoko

The Open Internacional de Valencia is a tournament for professional female tennis players played on outdoor clay courts. The event is part of the WTA 125 tournament series and has been held in Valencia, Spain since 2021.

In 2022, the tournament was upgraded to WTA 125 level, after being previously held on the ITF Women's World Tennis Tour.

== Past finals ==
=== Singles ===
| Year | Champion | Runner-up | Score |
|---|---|---|---|
| 2021 | (Italy) Martina Trevisan | (Hungary) Dalma Gálfi | 4–6, 6–4, 6–0 |
↓ WTA 125 tournament ↓
| 2022 | (China) Zheng Qinwen | (China) Wang Xiyu | 6–4, 4–6, 6–3 |
| 2023 | (Egypt) Mayar Sherif | (Spain) Marina Bassols Ribera | 6–3, 6–3 |
| 2024 | (United States) Ann Li | (Bulgaria) Viktoriya Tomova | 6–3, 6–4 |
| 2025 | (Spain) Nuria Párrizas Díaz | (United States) Louisa Chirico | 7–5, 7–6^{(11–9)} |
| 2026 | (France) Clara Burel | (Spain) Alicia Herrero Liñana | 4–6, 6–0, 6–2 |

=== Doubles ===
| Year | Champions | Runners-up | Score |
|---|---|---|---|
| 2021 | (Belgium) Ysaline Bonaventure (Georgia (country)) Ekaterine Gorgodze | (Spain) Ángela Fita Boluda (Russia) Oksana Selekhmeteva | 6–2, 2–6, [10–6] |
↓ WTA 125 tournament ↓
| 2022 | (Spain) Aliona Bolsova (Spain) Rebeka Masarova | Alexandra Panova (Netherlands) Arantxa Rus | 6–0, 6–3 |
| 2023 | (Spain) Aliona Bolsova (2) (Venezuela) Andrea Gámiz | Angelina Gabueva; Irina Khromacheva | 6–4, 4–6, [10–7] |
| 2024 | (Poland) Katarzyna Piter (Hungary) Fanny Stollár | (Italy) Angelica Moratelli (Mexico) Renata Zarazúa | 6–1, 4–6, [10–8] |
| 2025 | Maria Kozyreva; Iryna Shymanovich | (Spain) Yvonne Cavallé Reimers (Spain) Ángela Fita Boluda | 6–3, 6–4 |
| 2026 | (Slovenia) Dalila Jakupović (Switzerland) Naïma Karamoko | (Spain) Irene Burillo (Argentina) Nicole Fossa Huergo | 6–2, 6–3 |
