= Nuria Párrizas Díaz =

Spanish tennis player (born 1991)

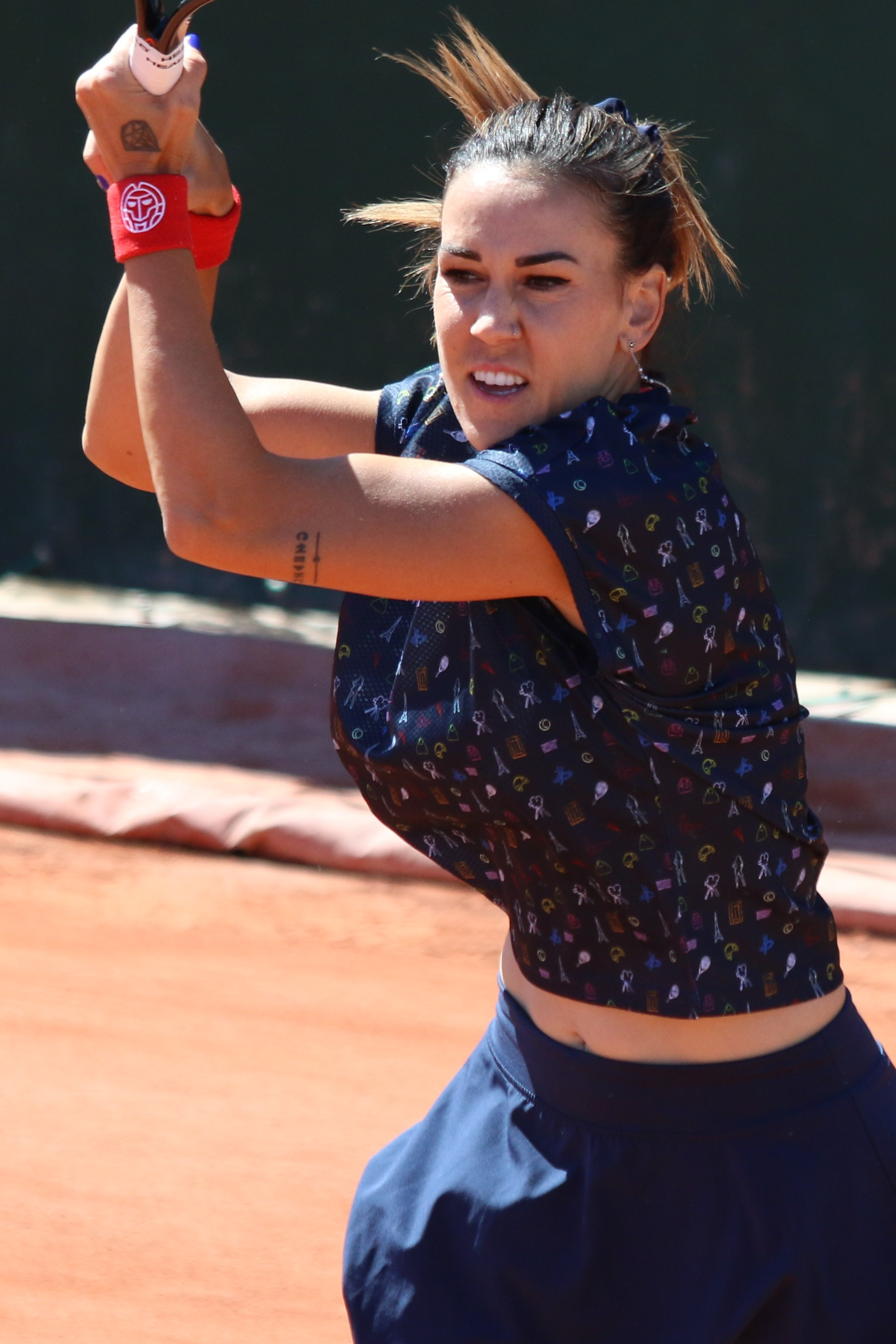
- Párrizas Díaz at the 2022 French Open
- Country (sports): Spain
- Residence: Valencia, Spain
- Born: 15 July 1991 (age 35) Granada, Spain
- Height: 1.70 m (5 ft 7 in)
- Turned pro: 2008
- Retired: 2026
- Plays: Right (two-handed backhand)
- Prize money: $2,227,150

Singles
- Career record: 536–373
- Career titles: 4 WTA Challengers
- Highest ranking: No. 45 (7 March 2022)
- Current ranking: No. 577 (29 June 2026)

Grand Slam singles results
- Australian Open: 3R (2022, 2023)
- French Open: 1R (2022, 2023)
- Wimbledon: 1R (2022, 2023)
- US Open: 1R (2021, 2022, 2025)

Doubles
- Career record: 105–163
- Career titles: 3 ITF
- Highest ranking: No. 320 (12 September 2022)
- Current ranking: No. 1356 (29 June 2026)

Grand Slam doubles results
- Australian Open: 1R (2022)
- French Open: 1R (2022, 2023)
- Wimbledon: 1R (2022)
- US Open: 1R (2022)

Team competitions
- Fed Cup: 4–2
- Last updated on: 1 July 2026.

Nuria Párrizas Díaz (born 15 July 1991) is a Spanish former professional tennis player. She has been ranked as high as world No. 45 in singles, which she first reached in March 2022, and No. 320 in doubles, achieved in September 2022.

== Career ==
=== Early years ===
Párrizas Díaz started playing tennis when she was six years old. Until the age of 14, she trained in her hometown. At that age, the Andalusian Tennis Federation awarded her a scholarship to train at their facilities in Seville and compete throughout Spain in the children's and cadet tournaments.

=== 2007–2016: Professional debut, injury and hiatus ===
At the age of 16, she began to play in the Futures tournaments, both nationally and internationally. Párrizas Díaz then relocated to live and train in Barcelona, at the Hispano Francés Academy.

However, due to a lack of professional support, she decided to return to Granada where she continued training and attending ITF tournaments, until she was 22 years old when she went to train in Italy. A major shoulder injury caused her career to come to a halt when she was among the top 300 in the WTA rankings.

At 24 years old, the doctors suggested to Párrizas Díaz to retire from tennis. However, she managed to recover, and despite not having sponsors, she looked for a way to compete professionally.

=== 2017–2019: Return to tour, two ITF Circuit titles ===
After her return in 2017, she won about a dozen ITF tournaments and also played in club leagues in Spain (Stadium Casablanca), Italy (Rocco Polimeni) and Germany (Esslingen).

In 2019, Párrizas Díaz decided to go back to training in Valencia to boost her career. She had a good year, already settled in 25k tournaments and above of the ITF Women's Circuit, where she managed to add two titles of that level (the first of this level) and get very close to the top 200.

=== 2020–2021: WTA Tour, top 100 and major debuts ===
In January 2020, Párrizas Díaz participated in her first major event after years of battle when she played in the qualifying competition for the Australian Open.

In April 2021, Párrizas Díaz qualified for the Copa Colsanitas tournament, with two solid wins. This would be her first main-draw appearance at the WTA Tour-level.

In July, she won her biggest title to date at the WTA 125 Swedish Open in Bastad, defeating Olga Govortsova in the final. As a result, she reached a new career-high of No. 108.

In August, she won her biggest ITF Circuit title at the 100k Tennis Challenge in Landisville, Pennsylvania. As a result, she entered the top 100 at world No. 96, on 16 August 2021.

She qualified for a Grand Slam tournament main draw at the US Open for the first time in her career.

Finally in September, Párrizas Díaz won her second WTA 125 title at the Columbus Challenger, the inaugural women's version of the event. She defeated Wang Xinyu in the final, achieving a new career-high ranking of No. 73. However, she lost to Wang in the doubles final.

=== 2022–2026: Two Australian Open third rounds, top 50 debut, retirement ===
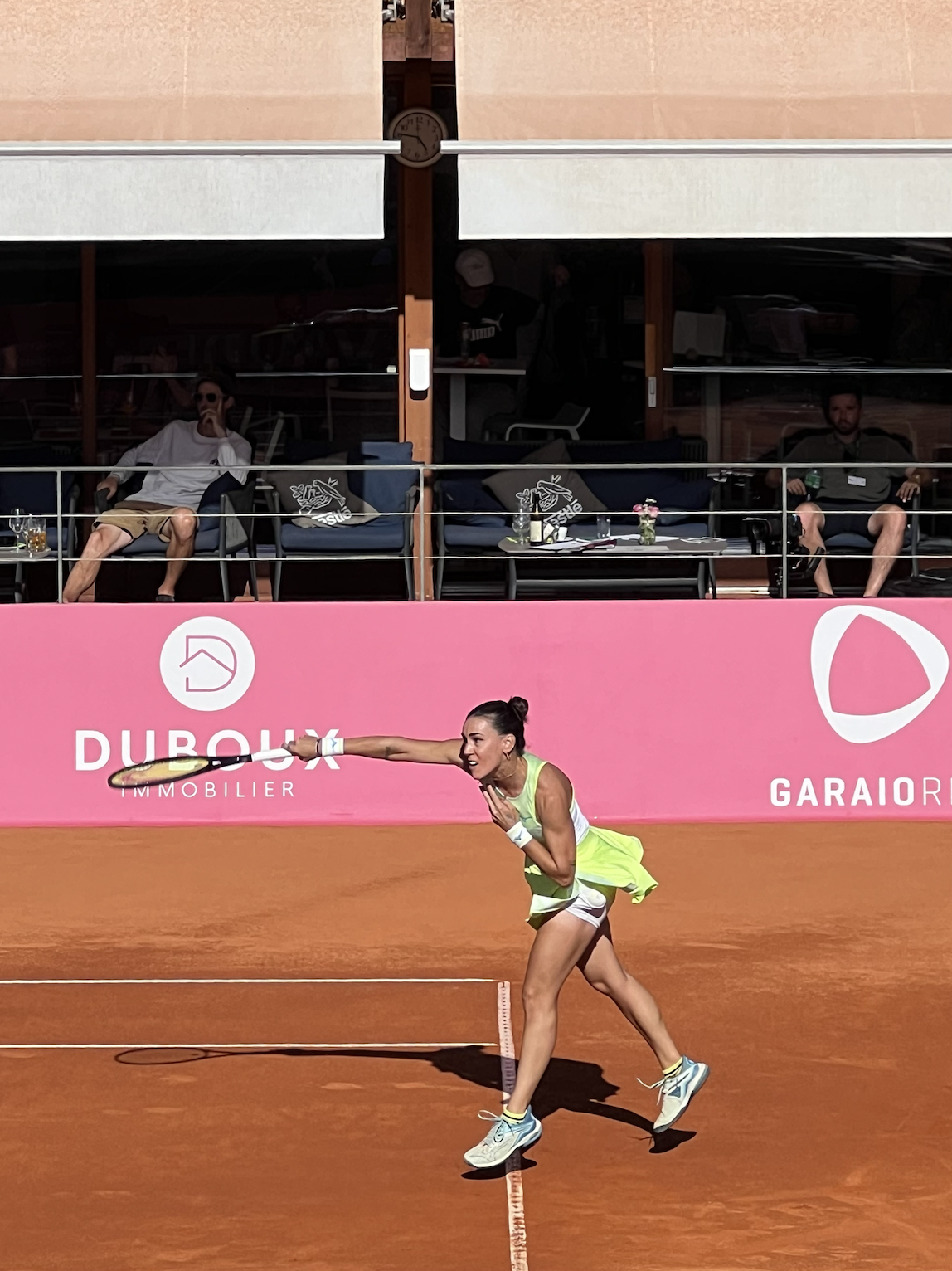
Parrizas Diaz at the 2024 Montreux Open

Párrizas Díaz reached the third round of a Grand Slam championship for the first time in her career at the 2022 Australian Open where she lost to 21st seed Jessica Pegula. As a result, she made her top-50 debut on 7 February 2022.

She reached the third round of a major for the second time in her career at the 2023 Australian Open, defeating 14th seed Beatriz Haddad Maia and Anastasia Potapova, before going out in the third round against Donna Vekić.

Párrizas Díaz was runner-up at the 2024 Ljubljana Open, losing to Jil Teichmann in the final.

She won her fourth WTA 125 title at the 2025 Internacional de Valencia by defeating Louisa Chirico in the final. Párrizas Díaz announced her retirement from professional tennis in July 2026.

== Performance timeline ==
Key
W	F	SF	QF	#R	RR	Q#	P#	DNQ	A	Z#	PO	G	S	B	NMS	NTI	P	NH

(W) winner; (F) finalist; (SF) semifinalist; (QF) quarterfinalist; (#R) rounds 4, 3, 2, 1; (RR) round-robin stage; (Q#) qualification round; (P#) preliminary round; (DNQ) did not qualify; (A) absent; (Z#) Davis/Fed Cup Zonal Group (with number indication) or (PO) play-off; (G) gold, (S) silver or (B) bronze Olympic/Paralympic medal; (NMS) not a Masters tournament; (NTI) not a Tier I tournament; (P) postponed; (NH) not held; (SR) strike rate (events won / competed); (W–L) win–loss record.
To avoid confusion and double counting, these charts are updated at the conclusion of a tournament or when the player's participation has ended.

Only main-draw results in WTA Tour, Grand Slam tournaments, Billie Jean King Cup, United Cup, Hopman Cup and Olympic Games are included in win–loss records.

=== Singles ===
Current through the 2024 Wimbledon Championships.

Tournament	2020	2021	2022	2023	2024	2025	SR	W–L	Win %
Grand Slam tournaments
Australian Open	Q2	Q1	3R	3R	Q1	1R	0 / 3	3–3	
French Open	Q1	Q3	1R	1R	Q1	Q1	0 / 2	0–2	
Wimbledon	NH	Q3	1R	1R	Q3	Q2	0 / 2	0–2	
US Open	A	1R	1R	Q2	Q2	1R	0 / 3	0–3	
Win–loss	0–0	0–1	1–4	2–3	0–0	0–2	0 / 10	3–10	
WTA 1000 tournametns
Qatar Open	A	NTI	A	NTI	A	A	0 / 0	0–0	
Dubai Championships	NTI	A	NTI	A	A	A	0 / 0	0–0	
Indian Wells Open	NH	1R	1R	2R	2R	Q1	0 / 4	2–4	
Miami Open	NH	A	1R	A	A	A	0 / 1	0–1	
Madrid Open	NH	A	2R	2R	Q1	Q1	0 / 2	2–2	
Italian Open	A	A	2R	2R	Q1	A	0 / 2	2–2	
Canadian Open	NH	A	1R	A	A	A	0 / 1	0–1	
Cincinnati Open	A	A	1R	A	A	Q1	0 / 1	0–1	
China Open	Not Held			A	A	A	0 / 0	0–0	
Wuhan Open	Not Held				A	A	0 / 0	0–0	
Guadalajara Open	Not Held		A	A	Not Tier I		0 / 0	0–0	
Career statistics
Tournaments	0	8	25	12	4	4	Career total: 53		
Overall win–loss	0–0	6–8	20–26	11–13	3–4	1–4	0 / 53	41–55	
Year-end ranking	232	65	72	123	98	187	$1,079,889		

== WTA 125 finals ==
=== Singles: 5 (4 titles, 1 runner-up) ===
Result	W–L	Date	Tournament	Surface	Opponent	Score
Win	1–0	Jul 2021	Bastad Open, Sweden	Clay	(Belarus) Olga Govortsova	6–2, 6–2
Win	2–0	Sep 2021	Columbus Challenger, United States	Hard (i)	(China) Wang Xinyu	7–6^{(2)}, 6–3
Win	3–0	Jan 2024	Canberra International, Australia	Hard	(United Kingdom) Harriet Dart	6–4, 6–3
Loss	3–1	Sep 2024	Ljubljana Open, Slovenia	Clay	(Switzerland) Jil Teichmann	6–7^{(8)}, 4–6
Win	4–1	Jun 2025	Internacional de Valencia, Spain	Clay	(United States) Louisa Chirico	7–5, 7–6^{(9)}

=== Doubles: 1 (runner-up) ===
Result	Date	Tournament	Surface	Partner	Opponents	Score
Loss	Sep 2021	Columbus Challenger, United States	Hard (i)	(Slovenia) Dalila Jakupović	(China) Wang Xinyu (China) Zheng Saisai	1–6, 1–6

== ITF Circuit finals ==
=== Singles: 40 (24 titles, 16 runner-ups) ===
Legend
$100,000 tournaments (3–0)
$25,000 tournaments (6–3)
$10/15,000 tournaments (15–13)

Result	W–L	Date	Location	Tier	Surface	Opponents	Score
Loss	0–1	Oct 2011	ITF Madrid, Spain	10,000	Hard	(Venezuela) Marina Giral Lores	6–4, 4–6, 4–6
Loss	0–2	Apr 2012	ITF Heraklion, Greece	10,000	Carpet	(Italy) Alice Savoretti	2–6, 6–3, 3–6
Loss	0–3	Apr 2012	ITF Rethymno, Greece	10,000	Hard	(Czech Republic) Dana Machálková	4–6, 4–6
Loss	0–4	May 2012	ITF Istanbul, Turkey	10,000	Hard	(Turkey) Başak Eraydın	3–6, 1–6
Loss	0–5	May 2013	ITF Monzon, Spain	10,000	Hard	(Russia) Polina Vinogradova	1–6, 1–6
Loss	0–6	Jun 2013	ITF Amarante, Portugal	10,000	Hard	(Mexico) Ximena Hermoso	3–6, 2–6
Win	1–6	July 2013	ITF Istanbul, Turkey	10,000	Hard	(France) Caroline Romeo	6–1, 6–2
Win	2–6	Oct 2013	ITF Marathon, Greece	10,000	Hard	(Netherlands) Jainy Scheepens	7–6^{(4)}, 2–6, 6–2
Loss	2–7	Apr 2014	ITF Sharm El Sheikh, Egypt	10,000	Hard	(Romania) Elena-Teodora Cadar	6–2, 6–7^{(6)}, 4–6
Win	3–7	April 2014	ITF Sharm El Sheikh	10,000	Hard	(Romania) Elena-Teodora Cadar	6–0, 3–6, 6–3
Loss	3–8	May 2014	ITF Sousse, Tunisia	10,000	Hard	(Mexico) Ana Sofía Sánchez	1–6, 2–6
Loss	3–9	Oct 2014	ITF Sharm El Sheikh	10,000	Hard	(United Kingdom) Harriet Dart	2–6, 1–6
Win	4–9	Oct 2014	ITF Sharm El Sheikh	10,000	Hard	(Serbia) Vojislava Lukić	6–4, 6–3
Win	5–9	Oct 2014	ITF Sharm El Sheikh	10,000	Hard	(Ukraine) Marianna Zakarlyuk	6–2, 6–4
Win	6–9	May 2015	ITF Sharm El Sheikh	10,000	Hard	(Italy) Anastasia Grymalska	6–2, 6–4
Loss	6–10	May 2015	ITF Sharm El Sheikh	10,000	Hard	(United States) Nadja Gilchrist	6–4, 5–7, 3–6
Win	7–10	Jun 2015	ITF Sharm El Sheikh	10,000	Hard	(Egypt) Sandra Samir	6–1, 6–3
Win	8–10	Sep 2016	ITF Madrid, Spain	10,000	Hard	(Sweden) Jacqueline Cabaj Awad	7–6^{(5)}, 6–3
Win	9–10	Sep 2016	ITF Madrid, Spain	10,000	Hard	(Spain) Cristina Bucșa	6–4, 3–6, 7–5
Win	10–10	Apr 2017	ITF Óbidos, Portugal	15,000	Carpet	(United Kingdom) Eden Silva	6–4, 6–3
Win	11–10	Sep 2017	ITF Cairo, Egypt	15,000	Clay	(Russia) Victoria Kan	6–4, 6–1
Loss	11–11	Sep 2017	ITF Cairo, Egypt	15,000	Clay	(Russia) Victoria Kan	5–7, 3–6
Win	12–11	Sep 2017	ITF Madrid, Spain	15,000	Hard	(Switzerland) Rebeka Masarova	6–4, 4–6, 6–2
Win	13–11	Oct 2017	ITF Lisboa, Portugal	15,000	Hard	(Germany) Romy Koelzer	2–6, 7–5, 7–5
Win	14–11	Nov 2017	ITF Sharm El Sheikh	15,000	Hard	(Egypt) Sandra Samir	7–5, 3–6, 7–6^{(3)}
Loss	14–12	Mar 2018	ITF Sharm El Sheikh	15,000	Hard	(Bulgaria) Julia Terziyska	0–6, 2–6
Loss	14–13	May 2018	ITF Cairo, Egypt	15,000	Clay	(Bulgaria) Gergana Topalova	5–7, 6–7^{(3)}
Loss	14–14	Jun 2018	ITF Óbidos, Portugal	25,000	Carpet	(Serbia) Dejana Radanović	3–6, 3–6
Loss	14–15	Apr 2019	ITF Óbidos, Portugal	25,000	Carpet	(Georgia (country)) Mariam Bolkvadze	2–6, 6–7^{(5–7)}
Loss	14–16	May 2019	ITF Óbidos, Portugal	25,000	Carpet	(Israel) Deniz Khazaniuk	1–6, 6–2, 1–6
Win	15–16	Aug 2019	ITF Las Palmas, Spain	W25	Clay	(Turkey) Çağla Büyükakçay	7–5, 3–6, 7–6^{(3)}
Win	16–16	Sep 2019	ITF Roehampton, UK	W25	Hard	(Germany) Anna-Lena Friedsam	6–2, 5–7, 7–5
Win	17–16	Dec 2020	ITF Monastir, Tunisia	W15	Hard	(France) Aubane Droguet	6–3, 6–0
Win	18–16	Feb 2021	ITF Potchefstroom, South Africa	W25	Hard	(Hungary) Anna Bondár	6–1, 4–6, 6–2
Win	19–16	Feb 2021	ITF Potchefstroom, South Africa	W25	Hard	(Canada) Carol Zhao	6–3, 6–0
Win	20–16	Mar 2021	ITF Manacor, Spain	W25	Hard	(Spain) Marina Bassols Ribera	6–2, 6–1
Win	21–16	Jun 2021	Grado Tennis Cup, Italy	W25	Clay	(Italy) Nuria Brancaccio	6–3, 5–7, 6–2
Win	22–16	Aug 2021	Landisville Tennis Challenge, United States	W100	Hard	(Belgium) Greet Minnen	7–6^{(6)}, 4–6, 7–6^{(7)}
Win	23–16	Aug 2024	ITF Maspalomas, Spain	W100	Clay	(Spain) Andrea Lázaro García	6–4, 6–3
Win	24–16	Aug 2024	Cary Tennis Classic, US	W100	Hard	(Mexico) Renata Zarazúa	6–3, 3–6, 7–6^{(2)}

=== Doubles: 9 (3 titles, 6 runner-ups) ===
Legend
$25,000 tournaments (0–2)
$10/15,000 tournaments (3–4)

Result	W–L	Date	Tournament	Tier	Surface	Partnering	Opponents	Score
Loss	0–1	Dec 2009	ITF Vinaros, Spain	10,000	Clay	(Italy) Benedetta Davato	(Netherlands) Lynn Schönhage (Netherlands) Elise Tamaëla	3–6, 4–6
Loss	0–2	Apr 2010	ITF Torrent, Spain	10,000	Clay	(Spain) Sheila Solsona Carcasona	(Italy) Benedetta Davato (Ukraine) Yevgeniya Kryvoruchko	w/o
Win	1–2	Jun 2012	ITF Amarante, Portugal	10,000	Hard	(Mexico) Ivette López	(Poland) Olga Brózda (Poland) Natalia Kołat	w/o
Loss	1–3	Apr 2013	ITF Heraklion, Greece	10,000	Carpet	(Spain) Olga Parres Azcoitia	(Serbia) Tamara Čurović (Italy) Camilla Rosatello	6–7^{(4)}, 3–6
Win	2–3	Nov 2013	ITF Sant Jordi, Spain	10,000	Hard	(Portugal) Bárbara Luz	(India) Sowjanya Bavisetti (Spain) Lucía Cervera Vázquez	7–5, 6–4
Loss	2–4	May 2014	ITF Sousse, Tunisia	10,000	Hard	(Spain) Olga Parres Azcoitia	(Slovakia) Chantal Škamlová (Russia) Avgusta Tsybysheva	3–6, 2–6
Win	3–4	Apr 2018	ITF Cairo, Egypt	15,000	Clay	(Netherlands) Dominique Karregat	(United States) Madeleine Kobelt (United States) Shelby Talcott	6–2, 6–4
Loss	3–5	Jun 2018	ITF Óbidos, Portugal	25,000	Carpet	(Germany) Caroline Werner	(Italy) Giulia Gatto-Monticone (Italy) Giorgia Marchetti	1–6, 1–6
Loss	3–6	May 2019	ITF Óbidos, Portugal	25,000	Carpet	(Italy) Martina Colmegna	(Georgia (country)) Sofia Shapatava (United Kingdom) Emily Webley-Smith	4–6, 1–6
