= Ariana Geerlings =

Spanish tennis player (born 2005)

- Full name: Ariana Geerlings Martínez
- Country (sports): Spain
- Residence: Murcia, Spain
- Born: 1 September 2005 (age 21) Granada, Spain
- Turned pro: 2021
- Plays: Right-handed (two-handed backhand)
- Coach: José Francisco Vidal
- Prize money: US$78,626

Singles
- Career record: 130–65
- Career titles: 1 WTA 125
- Highest ranking: No. 293 (11 August 2025)
- Current ranking: No. 301 (19 October 2026)

Doubles
- Career record: 20–18
- Highest ranking: No. 440 (9 June 2025)
- Current ranking: No. 502 (28 July 2025)
- Last updated on: 19 October 2026.

Ariana Geerlings Martínez (born 1 September 2005) is a Spanish professional tennis player. She has a career-high singles ranking by the WTA ranking of No. 293 in singles, achieved on 11 August 2025, and No. 440 in doubles, achieved on 9 June 2025.

Geerlings has won one title at WTA 125 level, in singles.

== Early life ==
Geerlings was born in Granada and raised in Murcia. Her father, Arjan Geerlings, is Dutch and her mother, Alicia Martínez, is Spanish. Her brother, Sergio, is a professional cyclist. She attended the Rafa Nadal Academy and currently trains at Real Murcia Club de Tenis 1919.

== Professional career ==
=== 2021–2023: Professional debut ===
In January 2021, Geerlings made her professional debut as a wildcard into the main draw of the $15k event at the Rafa Nadal Academy in Manacor, but lost in the first round to Kamilla Bartone. In March 2022, she recorded her first professional win at the $15k Vilas Academy Calvià Open in Palma Nova, defeating second seed Nina Potočnik. She reached her first final in November 2023 at the $15k event in Castellón, but lost to compatriot and top seed Ángela Fita Boluda.

=== 2024: ITF titles ===
In April 2024, she won back-to-back titles at the W15 Gran Canaria Women's TDC Series PRO events in Telde. That month, she also received a wildcard into the qualifying draw of the Madrid Open, but did not advance into the main draw. In May, she won her third title of the year at the W15 event in Kuršumlijska Banja, defeating second seed Anja Stanković in the final. In October, she reached the final of the W35 Open JCastillo-Occident in Baza, but lost to Susan Bandecchi.

=== 2025: WTA Tour debut ===
In June 2025, she and Wakana Sonobe reached the doubles final of the W75 Internazionali Femminili di Tennis Città di Caserta, but lost to Cho I-hsuan and Cho Yi-tsen. The following month, she made her WTA Tour main-draw debut after qualifying for the Hamburg Open, but lost in the first round to Astra Sharma in three sets.

=== 2026: First WTA 125 title ===
Given a wildcard entry into the main-draw, Geerlings won her first WTA 125 singles title in October at the Mallorca Championships, defeating second seed Laura Samson in straight sets in the final.

== Performance timelines ==
Key
W	F	SF	QF	#R	RR	Q#	DNQ	A	NH

(W) winner; (F) finalist; (SF) semifinalist; (QF) quarterfinalist; (#R) rounds 4, 3, 2, 1; (RR) round-robin stage; (Q#) qualification round; (DNQ) did not qualify; (A) absent; (NH) not held; (SR) strike rate (events won / competed); (W–L) win–loss record.
To avoid confusion and double counting, these charts are updated at the conclusion of a tournament or when the player's participation has ended.

=== Singles ===
Current through the 2025 Madrid Open.

Tournament	2024	2025	SR	W–L	Win%
WTA 1000 tournaments
Madrid Open	Q1	Q1	0 / 0	0–0	–
Win–loss	0–0	0–0	0 / 0	0–0	–

== WTA 125 finals ==
=== Singles: 1 (1 title) ===
Result	W–L	Date	Tournament	Surface	Opponent	Score
Win	1–0	Oct 2026	Mallorca Championships, Spain	Clay	(Czech Republic) Laura Samson	6–2, 6–2

== ITF Circuit finals ==
=== Singles: 12 (9 titles, 3 runner–ups) ===
Legend
W35 tournaments (2–2)
W15 tournaments (7–1)

Result	W–L	Date	Tournament	Tier	Surface	Opponent	Score
Loss	0–1	Nov 2023	ITF Castellón, Spain	W15	Clay	(Spain) Ángela Fita Boluda	4–6, 6–7^{(5)}
Win	1–1	Apr 2024	ITF Telde, Spain	W15	Clay	(Germany) Caroline Werner	2–6, 7–5, 7–5
Win	2–1	Apr 2024	ITF Telde, Spain	W15	Clay	(Switzerland) Leonie Küng	6–1, 6–1
Win	3–1	May 2024	ITF Kuršumlijska Banja, Serbia	W15	Clay	(Serbia) Anja Stanković	7–6^{(2)}, 6–7^{(2)}, 6–4
Win	4–1	Aug 2024	ITF Monastir, Tunisia	W15	Hard	(Egypt) Lamis Alhussein Abdel Aziz	6–4, 6–1
Loss	4–2	Sep 2024	ITF Baza, Spain	W35	Hard	(Switzerland) Susan Bandecchi	3–6, 3–6
Win	5–2	May 2025	ITF Bol, Croatia	W35	Clay	(Romania) Georgia Crăciun	6–2, 6–2
Win	6–2	Jul 2025	ITF Las Palmas, Spain	W15	Clay	(France) Nahia Berecoechea	6–4, 6–2
Win	7–2	Jul 2026	ITF Kuršumlijska Banja, Serbia	W15	Clay	(France) Nina Radovanović	6–3, 6–3
Win	8–2	Jul 2026	ITF Kuršumlijska Banja, Serbia	W15	Clay	(Denmark) Rebecca Munk Mortensen	6–0, 6–4
Win	9–2	Aug 2026	ITF Kraków, Poland	W35	Clay	(Slovenia) Dalila Jakupović	6–4, 6–3
Loss	9–3	Sep 2026	ITF Reus, Spain	W35	Clay	(Spain) Lucía Cortez Llorca	7–6^{(5)}, 4–6, 1–6

=== Doubles: 2 (2 runner-ups) ===
Legend
W75 tournaments (0–1)
W15 tournaments (0–1)

Result	W–L	Date	Tournament	Tier	Surface	Partner	Opponents	Score
Loss	0–1	May 2025	ITF Santa Margherita di Pula, Italy	W15	Clay	(Italy) Sofia Rocchetti	(Italy) Deborah Chiesa (Italy) Dalila Spiteri	w/o
Loss	0–2	May 2025	ITF Caserta, Italy	W75	Clay	(Japan) Wakana Sonobe	(Chinese Taipei) Cho I-hsuan (Chinese Taipei) Cho Yi-tsen	3–6, 6–7^{(5)}
