= Solana Sierra =

Argentine tennis player (born 2004)

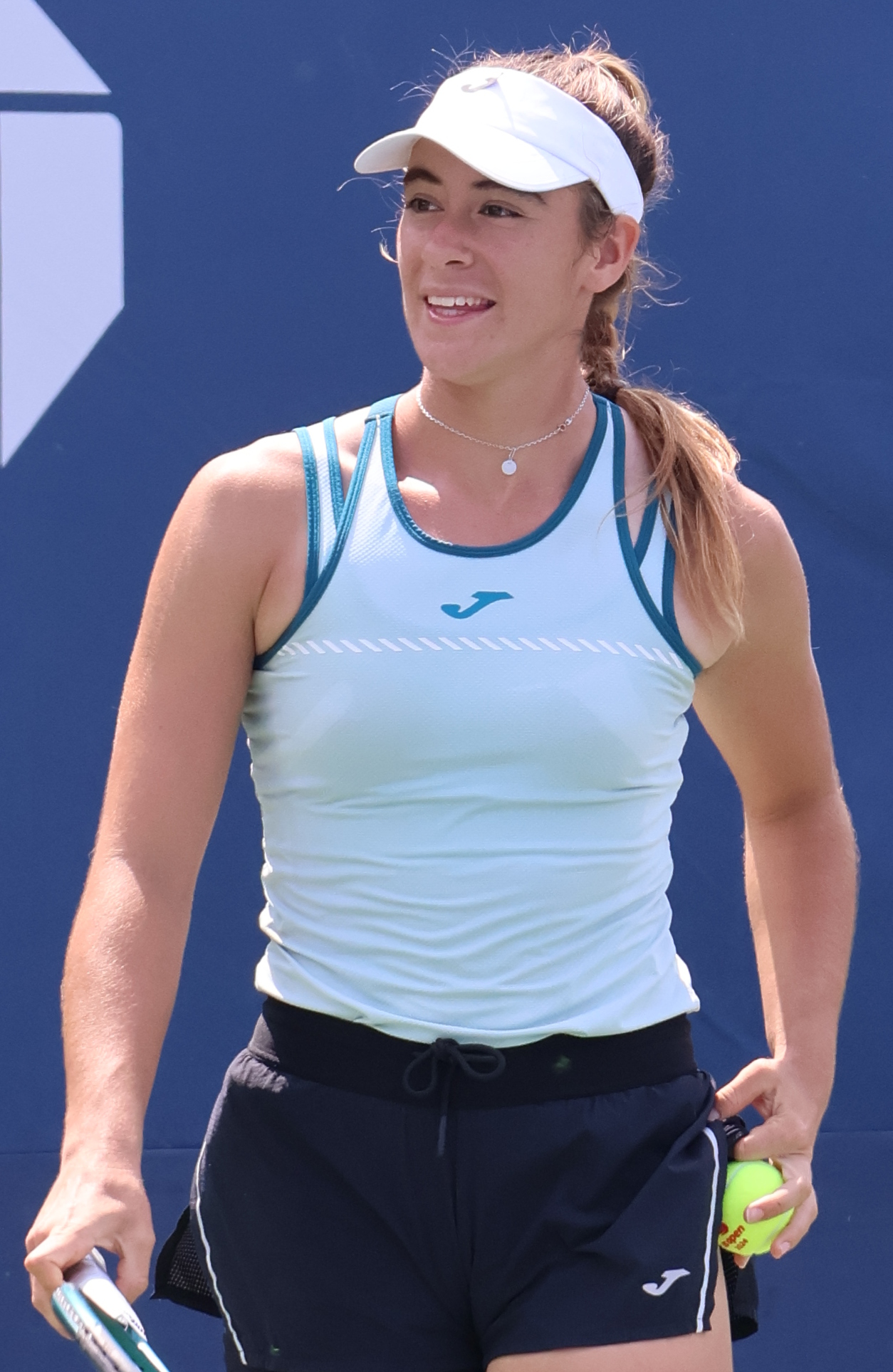
- Sierra at the 2024 US Open
- Country (sports): Argentina
- Born: 17 June 2004 (age 22) Mar del Plata, Argentina
- Height: 1.72 m (5 ft 8 in)
- Plays: Right (two-handed backhand)
- Prize money: $2,011,751

Singles
- Career record: 222–113
- Career titles: 2 WTA 125
- Highest ranking: No. 56 (8 June 2026)
- Current ranking: No. 93 (28 September 2026)

Grand Slam singles results
- Australian Open: 1R (2026)
- French Open: 3R (2026)
- Wimbledon: 4R (2025)
- US Open: 1R (2024, 2025, 2026)

Doubles
- Career record: 18–25
- Career titles: 1 ITF
- Highest ranking: No. 249 (13 July 2026)
- Current ranking: No. 291 (28 September 2026)

Grand Slam doubles results
- Australian Open: 1R (2026)
- French Open: 2R (2026)
- Wimbledon: 2R (2026)
- US Open: 1R (2025)

Team competitions
- Fed Cup: 4–1
- Last updated on: 8 October 2026.

Solana Sierra (born 17 June 2004) is an Argentine tennis player. She has a career-high WTA singles ranking of No. 56, achieved on 8 June 2026, and a best in doubles of 249, reached in July 2026..

== Career ==
=== 2022–2023: Back-to-back WTA 125 quarterfinals ===
Sierra made her Billie Jean King Cup debut for Argentina in 2022. At the 2023 Argentina Open straight sets wins over Varvara Lepchenko and Robin Montgomery saw her reach her first WTA 125 quarterfinal, where she lost to fifth seed and eventual champion Laura Pigossi. Seeded seventh, Sierra also made the last eight at the following week's 2023 Montevideo Open, defeating wildcard Carolina Bohrer Martins and Ekaterine Gorgodze, before her run was ended by top seed Diane Parry.

=== 2024: Major debut ===
Sierra reached her third WTA 125 quarterfinal at the Barranquilla Open where she overcame Jang Su-jeong and Liang En-shuo, only to fall at the last eight stage once again, this time to Antonia Ružić.

Ranked No. 159, Sierra made her Grand Slam tournament debut at the US Open, after qualifying into the main draw. She lost in the first round to Tatjana Maria in straight sets.

=== 2025: First WTA 125 title, Wimbledon 4th round, top 70 ===
In April, Sierra won her first WTA 125 title at the Antalya Challenger 3 tournament in Turkey, winning five matches. She beat two higher ranked players on the way to the title, including 142nd ranked Leyre Romero Gormaz in the final. This resulted in a new career-high of No. 119 in the singles rankings on 7 April 2025. Sierra made her top-100 debut on 16 June 2025.

At Wimbledon, where she entered the main-draw as a lucky loser, Sierra recorded her first win and subsequently reached the fourth round – her best achievement at a major thus far. In the first three rounds, she beat Olivia Gadecki, Katie Boulter, and Cristina Bucșa. Sierra became the first lucky loser to reach the women's singles fourth round at Wimbledon in the Open Era and the seventh woman overall to do so at any major, and was the second lucky loser to reach the fourth round of a major this year, after Eva Lys at the Australian Open. Despite losing to Laura Siegemund, she climbed up to world No. 67 in the WTA rankings, on 14 July 2025.

Seeded second at the SP Open, Sierra reached her first tour-level quarterfinal with a win over 15-year-old wildcard entrant Naná Silva. However, she lost to Francesca Jones in the last eight.

Sierra won her second WTA 125 title at the Mallorca Women's Championships, defeating Lola Radivojević in the final in straight sets.

=== 2026: First WTA 1000 fourth round ===
In April at the Madrid Open, Sierra defeated Dayana Yastremska, Magdalena Fręch and Zeynep Sönmez to make it into the fourth round of a WTA 1000 event for the first time. Her run was ended by Karolína Plíšková. The following month at the Italian Open, she recorded wins over qualifier Tamara Korpatsch and lucky loser Anhelina Kalinina, before losing in the third round to third seed Coco Gauff in three sets. Sierra defeated Emma Raducanu and 13th seed Jasmine Paolini to reach the third round at the French Open, where she was double bagelled by 18th seed Sorana Cîrstea.

== Performance timeline ==
Key
W	F	SF	QF	#R	RR	Q#	DNQ	A	NH

(W) winner; (F) finalist; (SF) semifinalist; (QF) quarterfinalist; (#R) rounds 4, 3, 2, 1; (RR) round-robin stage; (Q#) qualification round; (DNQ) did not qualify; (A) absent; (NH) not held; (SR) strike rate (events won / competed); (W–L) win–loss record.
To avoid confusion and double counting, these charts are updated at the conclusion of a tournament or when the player's participation has ended.

=== Singles ===
Current through the 2026 US Open.

Tournament	2024	2025	2026	SR	W–L	Win
Grand Slam tournaments
Australian Open	Q1	Q1	1R	0 / 1	0–1	0%
French Open	Q2	1R	3R	0 / 2	2–2	50%
Wimbledon	Q1	4R	2R	0 / 2	4–2	67%
US Open	1R	1R	1R	0 / 3	0–3	0%
Win–loss	0–1	3–3	3–4	0 / 8	6–8	43%
National representation
Summer Olympics	A	NH	NH	0 / 0	0–0	–
WTA 1000 tournaments
Qatar Open	A	A	1R	0 / 1	0–1	0%
Dubai Championships	A	A	Q1	0 / 0	0–0	–
Indian Wells Open	A	A	2R	0 / 1	1–1	50%
Miami Open	A	A	1R	0 / 1	0–1	0%
Madrid Open	A	A	4R	0 / 1	3–1	75%
Italian Open	A	Q1	3R	0 / 1	2–1	67%
Canadian Open	A	A	1R	0 / 1	0–1	0%
Cincinnati Open	A	1R	Q1	0 / 1	0–1	0%
China Open	A	A		0 / 0	0–0	–
Wuhan Open	A	A		0 / 0	0–0	–
Win–loss	0–0	0–1	6–6	0 / 7	6–7	46%
Career statistics
	2024	2025	2026	SR	W–L	Win %
Tournaments	1	6	12	Career total: 19		
Titles	0	0	0	Career total: 0		
Finals	0	0	0	Career total: 0		
Hard win–loss	0–1	3–4	3–9	0 / 14	6–14	30%
Clay win–loss	0–0	0–1	7–4	0 / 5	7–5	58%
Grass win–loss	0–0	3–1	1–1	0 / 2	4–2	67%
Overall win–loss	0–1	6–6	11–14	0 / 21	17–21	45%
Year-end ranking	154	66		$445,981		

== WTA 125 finals ==
=== Singles: 2 (2 titles) ===
Result	W–L	Date	Tournament	Surface	Opponent	Score
Win	1–0	Mar 2025	Antalya Challenger, Turkey	Clay	(Spain) Leyre Romero Gormaz	6–3, 6–4
Win	2–0	Oct 2025	Mallorca Championships, Spain	Clay	(Serbia) Lola Radivojević	6–3, 6–1

== ITF Circuit finals ==
=== Singles: 18 (14 titles, 4 runner-ups) ===
Legend W75 tournaments (2–0) W50 tournaments (2–0) W25/35 tournaments (7–3) W15 tournaments (3–1)	Finals by surface Hard (2–0) Clay (12–4)

Result	W–L	Date	Tournament	Tier	Surface	Opponent	Score
Loss	0–1	Mar 2022	ITF Palma Nova, Spain	W15	Clay	(Spain) Guiomar Maristany	3–6, 2–6
Win	1–1	Aug 2022	ITF Cancún, Mexico	W15	Hard	(China) Han Jiangxue	2–6, 6–3, 7–6^{(7)}
Win	2–1	Aug 2022	ITF Cancún, Mexico	W15	Hard	(Mexico) Victoria Rodriguez	6–3, 6–3
Win	3–1	Oct 2022	ITF Eldorado, Argentina	W15	Clay	(Argentina) Luisina Giovannini	6–3, 6–3
Win	4–1	Feb 2023	ITF Tucumán, Argentina	W25	Clay	(Spain) Rosa Vicens Mas	6–2, 6–2
Loss	4–2	Apr 2023	ITF Guayaquil, Ecuador	W25	Clay	(Argentina) Julia Riera	4–6, 6–4, 4–6
Loss	4–3	Jul 2023	ITF Bragado, Argentina	W25	Clay	(Argentina) Martina Capurro Taborda	4–6, 1–6
Loss	4–4	Aug 2023	ITF Junin, Argentina	W25	Clay	(Argentina) Martina Capurro Taborda	6–3, 6–7^{(2)}, 1–6
Win	5–4	Sep 2023	ITF Zaragoza, Spain	W25	Clay	(Argentina) Guillermina Naya	4–6, 6–2, 6–2
Win	6–4	Oct 2023	ITF Mendoza, Argentina	W25	Clay	(Argentina) Martina Capurro Taborda	6–1, 6–3
Win	7–4	Jan 2024	ITF Buenos Aires, Argentina	W35	Clay	(France) Alice Ramé	6–1, 6–4
Win	8–4	Jul 2024	ITF Getxo, Spain	W35	Clay (i)	(Spain) Lucía Cortez Llorca	6–2, 6–1
Win	9–4	Jul 2024	ITF Torino, Italy	W35	Clay	(Spain) Guiomar Maristany	4–6, 6–2, 6–0
Win	10–4	Jul 2024	ITF Pilar, Argentina	W35	Clay	(Peru) Lucciana Pérez Alarcón	2–6, 6–2, 6–1
Win	11–4	Sep 2024	ITF San Miguel de Tucumán, Argentina	W50	Clay	(Italy) Giorgia Pedone	6–2, 6–2
Win	12–4	Sep 2024	ITF Pilar, Argentina	W50	Clay	(France) Léolia Jeanjean	6–2, 0–0 ret.
Win	13–4	Jan 2025	Vero Beach Open, United States	W75	Clay	(United States) Whitney Osuigwe	6–7^{(6)}, 6–4, 7–5
Win	14–4	Apr 2025	Bellinzona Ladies Open, Switzerland	W75	Clay	(Italy) Silvia Ambrosio	6–4, 6–0

=== Doubles: 1 (title) ===
Legend W25 tournaments (1–0)	Finals by surface Clay (1–0)

Result	Date	Tournament	Tier	Surface	Partner	Opponents	Score
Win	Aug 2023	ITF Zaragoza, Spain	W25	Clay	(Italy) Martina Colmegna	(United States) Kimmi Hance (United States) Ashley Lahey	4–6, 6–4, [10–8]

== Junior Grand Slam tournament finals ==
=== Girls' singles: 1 (runner-up) ===
Result	Year	Tournament	Surface	Opponent	Score
Loss	2022	French Open	Clay	(Czech Republic) Lucie Havlíčková	3–6, 3–6

=== Grand Slam performance ===
Grand Slam performance – Singles:

- Australian Open: 1R (2022)
- French Open: F (2022)
- Wimbledon: 1R (2021)
- US Open: SF (2021)

Grand Slam performance – Doubles:

- Australian Open: 1R (2022)
- French Open: QF (2022)
- Wimbledon: 1R (2021)
- US Open: 1R (2021)

At the 2021 US Open, she made the semifinals in girls' singles, losing to eventual champion Robin Montgomery.

At the 2022 French Open, Sierra made her first junior Grand Slam tournament final, losing to Lucie Havlíčková.

== Team competition ==
=== Billie Jean King Cup ===
==== Singles (2–0) ====
Edition	Stage	Date	Location	Against	Surface	Opponent	W/L	Score
2022	Z1 R/R	Apr 2022	Salinas (ECU)	Colombia	Hard	Yuliana Lizarazo	W	6–2, 6–3
2022	Z1 R/R	Apr 2022	Salinas (ECU)	Brazil	Hard	Laura Pigossi	W	7–6^{(5)}, 4–6, 7–6^{(13)}
