= 2026 Memorial Eugenio Fontana =

- Date: 8–14 June
- Edition: 1st
- Category: WTA 125
- Draw: 32S / 16D
- Prize money: $115,000
- Surface: Clay
- Location: Modena, Italy
- Venue: Club La Meridiana

Champions

Singles
- (Poland) Katarzyna Kawa

Doubles
- (Spain) Yvonne Cavallé Reimers / (Belgium) Lara Salden
- Memorial Eugenio Fontana

The 2026 Memorial Eugenio Fontana was a professional women's tennis tournament played on outdoor clay courts. It was the 1st edition of the event, which is part of the 2026 WTA 125 tournaments. It took place in Modena, Italy, from 8 through 14 June 2026.

== Singles main draw entrants ==
=== Seeds ===
Country	Player	Rank^{†}	Seed
AND	Victoria Jiménez Kasintseva	104	1
LAT	Darja Semeņistaja	110	2
CZE	Dominika Šalková	113	3
AUT	Julia Grabher	121	4
ESP	Kaitlin Quevedo	126	5
EGY	Mayar Sherif	129	6
SLO	Tamara Zidanšek	134	7
ITA	Lisa Pigato	138	8

^{†} Ranking are as of 25 May 2026.

=== Other entrants ===
The following players received wildcards into the singles main draw :

- (Italy) Giorgia Pedone
- (Italy) Jennifer Ruggeri
- (Italy) Martina Trevisan
- (Italy) Federica Urgesi

The following players received entry from the qualifying draw :

- (Italy) Noemi Basiletti
- (Argentina) Victoria Bosio
- (Argentina) Jazmín Ortenzi
- (France) Tiantsoa Rakotomanga Rajaonah

=== Withdrawals ===
Before the tournament

- (Belgium) Sofia Costoulas → replaced by (China) You Xiaodi
- (Ukraine) Anhelina Kalinina → replaced by (China) Gao Xinyu
- (Serbia) Lola Radivojević → replaced by (France) Alice Tubello
- (Netherlands) Arantxa Rus → replaced by (Italy) Jessica Pieri

== Doubles main draw entrants ==
=== Seeds ===
Country	Player	Country	Player	Rank^{1}	Seed
ARG	Nicole Fossa Huergo	SLO	Nika Radišić	188	1
TPE	Cho I-hsuan	TPE	Cho Yi-tsen	196	2

- ^{1} Rankings as of 25 May 2026.

=== Other entrants ===
The following pairs received a wildcard into the doubles main draw:

- (Italy) Noemi Basiletti / (Italy) Giorgia Pedone

== Finals ==
=== Singles ===
- (Poland) Katarzyna Kawa def. (Italy) Lucia Bronzetti, 6–1, 4–6, 7–6^{(8–6)}

=== Doubles ===
- (Spain) Yvonne Cavallé Reimers / (Belgium) Lara Salden def. (Georgia (country)) Ekaterine Gorgodze / (Switzerland) Naïma Karamoko, 6–3, 6–4
