= 2023 Bellinzona Ladies Open =

Tennis tournament

- Date: 17–23 April 2023
- Edition: 3rd
- Category: ITF Women's World Tennis Tour
- Prize money: $60,000
- Surface: Clay / Outdoor
- Location: Bellinzona, Switzerland

Champions

Singles
- Mirra Andreeva

Doubles
- (Switzerland) Conny Perrin / (Czech Republic) Anna Sisková
← 2022 ·	Bellinzona Ladies Open	· 2024 →

The 2023 Bellinzona Ladies Open was a professional tennis tournament played on outdoor clay courts. It was the third edition of the tournament, which was part of the 2023 ITF Women's World Tennis Tour. It took place in Bellinzona, Switzerland, between 17 and 23 April 2023.

== Champions ==
=== Singles ===
- Mirra Andreeva def. (France) Fiona Ferro, 2–6, 6–1, 6–4

=== Doubles ===
- (Switzerland) Conny Perrin / (Czech Republic) Anna Sisková def. (United Kingdom) Freya Christie / (United Kingdom) Ali Collins, 3–6, 7–6^{(11–9)}, [10–5]

== Singles main draw entrants ==
=== Seeds ===
Country	Player	Rank	Seed
ITA	Lucia Bronzetti	79	1
FRA	Clara Burel	111	2
GER	Eva Lys	113	3
SUI	Simona Waltert	118	4
~~GBR~~	~~Katie Swan~~	~~149~~	~~5~~
CYP	Raluca Șerban	156	6
ESP	Leyre Romero Gormaz	174	7
FRA	Séléna Janicijevic	183	8
BEL	Marie Benoît	197	9
FRA	Carole Monnet	199	10
GRE	Valentini Grammatikopoulou	202	11
CZE	Barbora Palicová	205	12
SRB	Natalija Stevanović	206	13
SLO	Dalila Jakupović	208	14
PHI	Alex Eala	215	15
LAT	Darja Semeņistaja	224	16

- Rankings are as of 10 April 2023.

=== Other entrants ===
The following players received wildcards into the singles main draw:

- (Belgium) Sofia Costoulas
- (Switzerland) Fiona Ganz
- (Switzerland) Nadine Keller
- (Switzerland) Conny Perrin

The following players received entry from the qualifying draw:

- (France) Loïs Boisson
- (France) Estelle Cascino
- (Italy) Federica Di Sarra
- (France) Fiona Ferro
- (Romania) Oana Gavrilă
- (France) Emma Léné
- (Australia) Tina Nadine Smith
- (Germany) Joëlle Steur

The following players received entry as lucky losers:

- (United Kingdom) Emily Appleton
- (Italy) Chiara Girelli
- (France) Marine Szostak
