= 2021 ITF Women's World Tennis Tour – Bellinzona – Singles =

Bellinzona – Singles
- 2021 ITF Women's World Tennis Tour – Bellinzona

Final
- Champion: (Austria) Julia Grabher
- Runner-up: (Italy) Lucia Bronzetti
- Score: 6–2, 6–3

Events
Singles	Doubles
ITF Women's World Tennis Tour – Bellinzona	· 2022 →

This was the first edition of the tournament.

Julia Grabher won the title, defeating Lucia Bronzetti in the final, 6–2, 6–3.

== Seeds ==
All seeds receive a bye into the second round.

1. (France) Océane Dodin (second round)
2. (Ukraine) Katarina Zavatska (third round, retired)
3. (China) Wang Xiyu (second round)
4. (Romania) Elena-Gabriela Ruse (third round)
5. (Ukraine) Anhelina Kalinina (second round)
6. (Turkey) Çağla Büyükakçay (second round)
7. (Germany) Antonia Lottner (second round)
8. (Germany) Mona Barthel (quarterfinals)
9. (Japan) Yuki Naito (second round)
10. (China) Lu Jiajing (second round)
11. (Italy) Martina Di Giuseppe (second round)
12. (Romania) Laura Ioana Paar (second round)
13. (Croatia) Jana Fett (quarterfinals)
14. (South Korea) Han Na-lae (second round)
15. (Bulgaria) Isabella Shinikova (second round)
16. (Canada) Rebecca Marino (second round)

== Draw ==
=== Key ===
- Q = Qualifier
- WC = Wild card
- LL = Lucky loser
- Alt = Alternate
- SE = Special exempt
- PR = Protected ranking
- ITF = ITF entry
- JE = Junior exempt
- w/o = Walkover
- r = Retired
- d = Defaulted
- SR = Special ranking

=== Finals ===
Quarterfinals
(Austria) Julia Grabher	6	4	6
8	(Germany) Mona Barthel	4	6	2
(Italy) Bianca Turati	2	0
(Georgia (country)) Ekaterine Gorgodze	6	6
Q	(Italy) Lucia Bronzetti	2	7^{7}	6
Q	(North Macedonia) Lina Gjorcheska	6	6^{3}	0
WC	(Switzerland) Simona Waltert	6	2	7
13	(Croatia) Jana Fett	4	6	5

Semifinals
(Austria) Julia Grabher	6	6
(Georgia (country)) Ekaterine Gorgodze	2	2
Q	(Italy) Lucia Bronzetti	6^{0}	6	6
WC	(Switzerland) Simona Waltert	7^{7}	4	2

Final
(Austria) Julia Grabher	6	6
Q	(Italy) Lucia Bronzetti	2	3

=== Top half ===
==== Section 1 ====
First round
(Austria) J Grabher	6	6
Q	(Germany) S Wagner	4	3
Q	(Germany) V Heisen	0	1
(Belgium) M Zanevska	6	6
(Croatia) T Mrdeža	6	6
(Croatia) T Lukas	3	4
WC	(Switzerland) S Scilipoti	6	5	6
WC	(Switzerland) V Ryser	1	7	0

Second round
1	(France) O Dodin	6^{7}	6^{2}
(Austria) J Grabher	7^{9}	7^{7}
(Belgium) M Zanevska	6	6
14	(South Korea) N-l Han	3	3
10	(China) Jia Lu	3	6	1
(Croatia) T Mrdeža	6	4	6
WC	(Switzerland) S Scilipoti	7^{3}	1	1
8	(Germany) M Barthel	6^{3}	6	6

Third round
(Austria) J Grabher	6	4	7^{7}
(Belgium) M Zanevska	1	6	6^{1}
(Croatia) T Mrdeža	5	7^{7}	2
8	(Germany) M Barthel	7	6^{5}	6

Quarterfinals
(Austria) J Grabher	6	4	6
8	(Germany) M Barthel	4	6	2

==== Section 2 ====
First round
(France) T Andrianjafitrimo	0	1
(Hungary) A Bondár	6	6
(Italy) B Turati	6	6
(Bulgaria) E Kostova	4	4
(Liechtenstein) K von Deichmann	6^{1}	4
(Georgia (country)) E Gorgodze	7^{7}	6
Q	(Cyprus) R Șerban	6	6
WC	(Switzerland) Y In-Albon	4	2

Second round
4	(Romania) E-G Ruse	5	6	7^{7}
(Hungary) A Bondár	7	1	6^{5}
(Italy) B Turati	6^{5}	6	6
15	(Bulgaria) I Shinikova	7^{7}	3	3
11	(Italy) M Di Giuseppe	1	4
(Georgia (country)) E Gorgodze	6	6
Q	(Cyprus) R Șerban	6	6
5	(Ukraine) A Kalinina	2	2

Third round
4	(Romania) E-G Ruse	3	5
(Italy) B Turati	6	7
(Georgia (country)) E Gorgodze	6	6^{4}	6
Q	(Cyprus) R Șerban	2	7^{7}	1

Quarterfinals
(Italy) B Turati	2	0
(Georgia (country)) E Gorgodze	6	6

=== Bottom half ===
==== Section 3 ====
First round
(Hungary) RL Jani	6	1	2
Q	(Australia) S Mendez	4	6	6
Q	(Italy) L Bronzetti	7^{7}	0
(Hungary) D Gálfi	6^{3}	0^{r}
WC	(Switzerland) J Züger	3	3
Q	(Italy) L Stefanini	6	6
Q	(North Macedonia) L Gjorcheska	4	6	6
(Germany) J Niemeier	6	1	3

Second round
6	(Turkey) Ç Büyükakçay	4	7	5
Q	(Australia) S Mendez	6	5	7
Q	(Italy) L Bronzetti	2	6	7^{8}
9	(Japan) Y Naito	6	4	6^{6}
16	(Canada) R Marino	4	6	6^{4}
Q	(Italy) L Stefanini	6	4	7^{7}
Q	(North Macedonia) L Gjorcheska	3	6	6
3	(China) Xiy Wang	6	4	0

Third round
Q	(Australia) S Mendez	2	6	2
Q	(Italy) L Bronzetti	6	4	6
Q	(Italy) L Stefanini	6	3	0
Q	(North Macedonia) L Gjorcheska	1	6	6

Quarterfinals
Q	(Italy) L Bronzetti	2	7^{7}	6
Q	(North Macedonia) L Gjorcheska	6	6^{3}	0

==== Section 4 ====
First round
WC	(Switzerland) S Waltert	6	6
(France) A Hesse	1	4
JE	(Philippines) A Eala	7^{8}	6
LL	(France) M Yerolymos	6^{6}	2
Q	(Italy) C Rosatello	6^{2}	6	2
(Japan) C Muramatsu	7^{7}	2	6
(Spain) E Guerrero Álvarez	6	2	6
(Russia) V Savinykh	3	6	1

Second round
7	(Germany) A Lottner	6	6^{4}	4
WC	(Switzerland) S Waltert	3	7^{7}	6
JE	(Philippines) A Eala	6^{6}	6	6
12	(Romania) LI Paar	7^{8}	1	0
13	(Croatia) J Fett	6	6
(Japan) C Muramatsu	2	3
(Spain) E Guerrero Álvarez	4	5
2	(Ukraine) K Zavatska	6	7

Third round
WC	(Switzerland) S Waltert	7	3	6
JE	(Philippines) A Eala	5	6	2
13	(Croatia) J Fett	6	3
2	(Ukraine) K Zavatska	4	0^{r}

Quarterfinals
WC	(Switzerland) S Waltert	6	2	7
13	(Croatia) J Fett	4	6	5
