= 2021 ITF Women's World Tennis Tour – Bellinzona =

Tennis tournament

- Date: 5–11 April 2021
- Edition: 1st
- Category: ITF Women's World Tennis Tour
- Prize money: $60,000
- Surface: Clay
- Location: Bellinzona, Switzerland

Champions

Singles
- (Austria) Julia Grabher

Doubles
- (Kazakhstan) Anna Danilina / (Georgia (country)) Ekaterine Gorgodze
ITF Women's World Tennis Tour – Bellinzona	· 2022 →

The 2021 ITF Women's World Tennis Tour – Bellinzona was a professional women's tennis tournament played on outdoor clay courts. It was the first edition of the tournament which was part of the 2021 ITF Women's World Tennis Tour. It took place in Bellinzona, Switzerland between 5 and 11 April 2021.

== Singles main-draw entrants ==
=== Seeds ===
Country	Player	Rank^{1}	Seed
FRA	Océane Dodin	120	1
UKR	Katarina Zavatska	128	2
CHN	Wang Xiyu	135	3
ROU	Elena-Gabriela Ruse	163	4
UKR	Anhelina Kalinina	167	5
TUR	Çağla Büyükakçay	179	6
GER	Antonia Lottner	186	7
GER	Mona Barthel	188	8
JPN	Yuki Naito	189	9
CHN	Lu Jiajing	196	10
ITA	Martina Di Giuseppe	200	11
ROU	Laura Ioana Paar	201	12
CRO	Jana Fett	210	13
KOR	Han Na-lae	212	14
BUL	Isabella Shinikova	218	15
CAN	Rebecca Marino	222	16

- ^{1} Rankings are as of 22 March 2021.

=== Other entrants ===
The following players received wildcards into the singles main draw:

- (Switzerland) Ylena In-Albon
- (Switzerland) Valentina Ryser
- (Switzerland) Sebastianna Scilipoti
- (Switzerland) Simona Waltert
- (Switzerland) Joanne Züger

The following player received entry using a junior exempt:

- (Philippines) Alex Eala

The following players received entry from the qualifying draw:

- (Italy) Lucia Bronzetti
- (North Macedonia) Lina Gjorcheska
- (Germany) Vivian Heisen
- (Australia) Seone Mendez
- (Italy) Camilla Rosatello
- (Cyprus) Raluca Șerban
- (Italy) Lucrezia Stefanini
- (Germany) Stephanie Wagner

The following player received entry as a lucky loser:

- (France) Margot Yerolymos

== Champions ==
=== Singles ===
- (Austria) Julia Grabher def. (Italy) Lucia Bronzetti, 6–2, 6–3

=== Doubles ===
- (Kazakhstan) Anna Danilina / (Georgia (country)) Ekaterine Gorgodze def. (Canada) Rebecca Marino / (Japan) Yuki Naito, 7–5, 6–3
