= 2022 Bellinzona Ladies Open =

Tennis tournament

- Date: 11–17 April 2022
- Edition: 2nd
- Category: ITF Women's World Tennis Tour
- Prize money: $60,000
- Surface: Clay / Outdoor
- Location: Bellinzona, Switzerland

Champions

Singles
- (Cyprus) Raluca Șerban

Doubles
- (United Kingdom) Alicia Barnett / (United Kingdom) Olivia Nicholls
← 2021 ·	Bellinzona Ladies Open	· 2023 →

The 2022 Bellinzona Ladies Open was a professional tennis tournament played on outdoor clay courts. It was the second edition of the tournament which was part of the 2022 ITF Women's World Tennis Tour. It took place in Bellinzona, Switzerland between 11 and 17 April 2022.

== Singles main draw entrants ==
=== Seeds ===
Country	Player	Rank^{1}	Seed
GEO	Ekaterine Gorgodze	120	1
FRA	Fiona Ferro	132	2
SLO	Polona Hercog	133	3
	Anna Blinkova	136	4
SUI	Ylena In-Albon	142	5
SUI	Susan Bandecchi	169	6
	Marina Melnikova	181	7
BIH	Dea Herdželaš	210	8

- ^{1} Rankings are as of 4 April 2022.

=== Other entrants ===
The following players received wildcards into the singles main draw:

- (Switzerland) Alina Granwehr
- (Switzerland) Leonie Küng
- (Switzerland) Céline Naef
- (Switzerland) Sebastianna Scilipoti

The following player received entry using a protected ranking:

- (Liechtenstein) Kathinka von Deichmann

The following players received entry from the qualifying draw:

- (Italy) Federica Arcidiacono
- (Czech Republic) Miriam Kolodziejová
- (Czech Republic) Johana Marková
- (Germany) Yana Morderger
- (Germany) Lena Papadakis
- (France) Alice Ramé
- (Cyprus) Raluca Șerban
- (Serbia) Natalija Stevanović

== Champions ==
=== Singles ===
- (Cyprus) Raluca Șerban def. (Georgia (country)) Ekaterine Gorgodze, 6–3, 6–0

=== Doubles ===
- (United Kingdom) Alicia Barnett / (United Kingdom) Olivia Nicholls def. (Switzerland) Xenia Knoll / Oksana Selekhmeteva, 6–7^{(7–9)}, 6–4, [10–7]
