= 2023 Bellinzona Ladies Open – Singles =

Singles
- 2023 Bellinzona Ladies Open

Final
- Champion: Mirra Andreeva
- Runner-up: (France) Fiona Ferro
- Score: 2–6, 6–1, 6–4

Events
Singles	Doubles
← 2022 ·	Bellinzona Ladies Open	· 2024 →

Raluca Șerban was the defending champion but lost to Natalija Stevanović in the quarterfinals.

Mirra Andreeva won the title, defeating Fiona Ferro in the final, 2–6, 6–1, 6–4.

== Seeds ==
All seeds receive a bye into the second round.

1. (Italy) Lucia Bronzetti (second round)
2. (France) Clara Burel (second round)
3. (Germany) Eva Lys (second round)
4. (Switzerland) Simona Waltert (third round)
5. (United Kingdom) Katie Swan (withdrew)
6. (Cyprus) Raluca Șerban (quarterfinals)
7. (Spain) Leyre Romero Gormaz (second round)
8. (France) Séléna Janicijevic (second round)
9. (Belgium) Marie Benoît (quarterfinals)
10. (France) Carole Monnet (third round)
11. (Greece) Valentini Grammatikopoulou (second round)
12. (Czech Republic) Barbora Palicová (quarterfinals)
13. (Serbia) Natalija Stevanović (semifinals)
14. (Slovenia) Dalila Jakupović (second round)
15. (Philippines) Alex Eala (second round)
16. (Latvia) Darja Semeņistaja (second round)

== Draw ==
=== Key ===
- Q = Qualifier
- WC = Wild card
- LL = Lucky loser
- Alt = Alternate
- SE = Special exempt
- PR = Protected ranking
- ITF = ITF entry
- JE = Junior exempt
- w/o = Walkover
- r = Retired
- d = Defaulted
- SR = Special ranking

=== Finals ===
Quarterfinals
Mirra Andreeva	6	6
9	(Belgium) Marie Benoît	2	1
(Switzerland) Céline Naef	6	6
(Turkey) Zeynep Sönmez	3	1
6	(Cyprus) Raluca Șerban	4	4
13	(Serbia) Natalija Stevanović	6	6
12	(Czech Republic) Barbora Palicová	3	6^{6}
Q	(France) Fiona Ferro	6	7^{8}

Semifinals
Mirra Andreeva	6	6
(Switzerland) Céline Naef	1	4
13	(Serbia) Natalija Stevanović	3	4
Q	(France) Fiona Ferro	6	6

Final
Mirra Andreeva	2	6	6
Q	(France) Fiona Ferro	6	1	4

=== Top half ===
==== Section 1 ====
First round
(Spain) A Lázaro García	7	6
WC	(Belgium) S Costoulas	5	3
WC	(Switzerland) F Ganz	0	2
M Andreeva	6	6
Q	(France) L Boisson	6^{6}	7^{7}	3
(Germany) J Middendorf	7^{8}	6^{2}	6
(Italy) A Moratelli	7^{7}	7
(Italy) M Colmegna	6^{5}	5

Second round
1	(Italy) L Bronzetti	6	6^{7}	6^{7}
(Spain) A Lázaro García	3	7^{9}	7^{9}
M Andreeva	6	4	6
16	(Latvia) D Semeņistaja	4	6	1
9	(Belgium) M Benoît	6	6
(Germany) J Middendorf	2	2
(Italy) A Moratelli	6	6
8	(France) S Janicijevic	4	1

Third round
(Spain) A Lázaro García	2	4
M Andreeva	6	6
9	(Belgium) M Benoît	6	6
(Italy) A Moratelli	4	3

Quarterfinals
M Andreeva	6	6
9	(Belgium) M Benoît	2	1

==== Section 2 ====
First round
(Czech Republic) A Sisková	4	5
(Switzerland) C Naef	6	7
WC	(Switzerland) N Keller	6	7^{9}
LL	(France) M Szostak	3	6^{7}
(Turkey) Z Sönmez	6	6
(Switzerland) J Dürst	3	1
(Spain) I Burillo Escorihuela	3	2
A Tikhonova	6	6

Second round
3	(Germany) E Lys	6	6^{3}	4
(Switzerland) C Naef	2	7^{7}	6
WC	(Switzerland) N Keller	6	6
14	(Slovenia) D Jakupović	1	1
11	(Greece) V Grammatikopoulou	2	1
(Turkey) Z Sönmez	6	6
A Tikhonova	7^{7}	2	7
7	(Spain) L Romero Gormaz	6^{5}	6	5

Third round
(Switzerland) C Naef	6	6
WC	(Switzerland) N Keller	0	4
(Turkey) Z Sönmez	6	6^{6}	6
A Tikhonova	4	7^{8}	1

Quarterfinals
(Switzerland) C Naef	6	6
(Turkey) Z Sönmez	3	1

=== Bottom half ===
==== Section 3 ====
First round
Q	(Australia) TN Smith	6	6
Q	(Romania) O Gavrilă	3	2
LL	(Italy) C Girelli	5	4
(Turkey) Ç Büyükakçay	7	6
LL	(United Kingdom) E Appleton	1	6	5
(France) A Albié	6	4	7
(France) T Andrianjafitrimo	6	6
Q	(Italy) F Di Sarra	4	3

Second round
6	(Cyprus) R Șerban	7	6
Q	(Australia) TN Smith	5	0
(Turkey) Ç Büyükakçay	6	3	2
10	(France) C Monnet	3	6	6
13	(Serbia) N Stevanović	6	6
(France) A Albié	4	1
(France) T Andrianjafitrimo	3	3
4	(Switzerland) S Waltert	6	6

Third round
6	(Cyprus) R Șerban	7	6
10	(France) C Monnet	5	2
13	(Serbia) N Stevanović	6	6
4	(Switzerland) S Waltert	4	4

Quarterfinals
6	(Cyprus) R Șerban	4	4
13	(Serbia) N Stevanović	6	6

==== Section 4 ====
First round
Q	(Germany) Jo Steur	1	4
WC	(Switzerland) C Perrin	6	6
(Czech Republic) M Bayerlová	2	7^{7}	2
(Spain) Á Fita Boluda	6	6^{2}	6
(Georgia (country)) E Gorgodze	6	6^{3}	6^{4}
(Romania) IG Ghioroaie	3	7^{7}	7^{7}
Q	(France) F Ferro	6	6
Q	(France) E Cascino	3	2

Second round
Q	(France) E Léné	4	2
WC	(Switzerland) C Perrin	6	6
(Spain) Á Fita Boluda	6	2	4
12	(Czech Republic) B Palicová	2	6	6
15	(Philippines) A Eala	5	1
(Romania) IG Ghioroaie	7	6
Q	(France) F Ferro	6	6
2	(France) C Burel	4	1

Third round
WC	(Switzerland) C Perrin	5	1
12	(Czech Republic) B Palicová	7	6
(Romania) IG Ghioroaie	7	2	1
Q	(France) F Ferro	5	6	6

Quarterfinals
12	(Czech Republic) B Palicová	3	6^{6}
Q	(France) F Ferro	6	7^{8}
