= 2022 Bellinzona Ladies Open – Doubles =

Doubles
- 2022 Bellinzona Ladies Open

Final
- Champions: (United Kingdom) Alicia Barnett (United Kingdom) Olivia Nicholls
- Runners-up: (Switzerland) Xenia Knoll; Oksana Selekhmeteva
- Score: 6–7^{(7–9)}, 6–4, [10–7]

Events
Singles	Doubles
← 2021 ·	Bellinzona Ladies Open	· 2023 →

Anna Danilina and Ekaterine Gorgodze were the defending champions but chose not to participate.

Alicia Barnett and Olivia Nicholls won the title, defeating Xenia Knoll and Oksana Selekhmeteva in the final, 6–7^{(7–9)}, 6–4, [10–7].

== Seeds ==
1. (United Kingdom) Alicia Barnett / (United Kingdom) Olivia Nicholls (champions)
2. (Switzerland) Xenia Knoll / Oksana Selekhmeteva (final)
3. (Switzerland) Leonie Küng / (United Kingdom) Emily Webley-Smith (semifinals)
4. (Belgium) Magali Kempen / (Switzerland) Conny Perrin (withdrew)

== Draw ==
=== Key ===
- Q = Qualifier
- WC = Wild card
- LL = Lucky loser
- Alt = Alternate
- SE = Special exempt
- PR = Protected ranking
- ITF = ITF entry
- JE = Junior exempt
- w/o = Walkover
- r = Retired
- d = Defaulted
- SR = Special ranking

=== Draw ===
First round
1	(United Kingdom) A Barnett (United Kingdom) O Nicholls	6	7^{7}
N Vikhlyantseva (Switzerland) S Waltert	3	6^{4}
(Switzerland) J Dürst (France) C Monnet	6	6
WC	(Switzerland) N Karamoko (Switzerland) S Scilipoti	2	1
3	(Switzerland) L Küng (United Kingdom) E Webley-Smith	6	6
(Italy) F Arcidiacono (Italy) M Delai	4	4
(Germany) T Morderger (Germany) Y Morderger	7^{7}	6
WC	(Switzerland) A Granwehr (Switzerland) C Naef	6^{4}	4
(France) E Jacquemot (Serbia) N Stevanović	7^{8}	6^{2}	[10]
(United Kingdom) E Appleton (United Kingdom) A Collins	6^{6}	7^{7}	[7]
(Switzerland) F Ganz (Germany) L Papadakis	w/o
4	(Belgium) M Kempen (Switzerland) C Perrin
WC	(Italy) RM De Ponti (Switzerland) K Tsygourova	1	1
(Czech Republic) M Kolodziejová (Cyprus) R Șerban	6	6
(Bosnia and Herzegovina) D Herdželaš (Czech Republic) J Marková	3	3
2	(Switzerland) X Knoll; O Selekhmeteva	6	6

Quarterfinals
1	(United Kingdom) A Barnett (United Kingdom) O Nicholls	6	3	[10]
(Switzerland) J Dürst (France) C Monnet	1	6	[8]
3	(Switzerland) L Küng (United Kingdom) E Webley-Smith	7	2	[10]
(Germany) T Morderger (Germany) Y Morderger	5	6	[4]
(France) E Jacquemot (Serbia) N Stevanović	6	6
(Switzerland) F Ganz (Germany) L Papadakis	3	3
(Czech Republic) M Kolodziejová (Cyprus) R Șerban	4	6^{5}
2	(Switzerland) X Knoll; O Selekhmeteva	6	7^{7}

Semifinals
1	(United Kingdom) A Barnett (United Kingdom) O Nicholls	6	7^{7}
3	(Switzerland) L Küng (United Kingdom) E Webley-Smith	1	6^{3}
(France) E Jacquemot (Serbia) N Stevanović	4	3
2	(Switzerland) X Knoll; O Selekhmeteva	6	6

Final
1	(United Kingdom) A Barnett (United Kingdom) O Nicholls	6^{7}	6	[10]
2	(Switzerland) X Knoll; O Selekhmeteva	7^{9}	4	[7]
