= 2022 Bellinzona Ladies Open – Singles =

Singles
- 2022 Bellinzona Ladies Open

Final
- Champion: (Cyprus) Raluca Șerban
- Runner-up: (Georgia (country)) Ekaterine Gorgodze
- Score: 6–3, 6–0

Events
Singles	Doubles
← 2021 ·	Bellinzona Ladies Open	· 2023 →

Julia Grabher was the defending champion but chose not to participate.

Raluca Șerban won the title, defeating Ekaterine Gorgodze in the final, 6–3, 6–0.

== Seeds ==
1. (Georgia (country)) Ekaterine Gorgodze (final)
2. (France) Fiona Ferro (second round)
3. (Slovenia) Polona Hercog (quarterfinals)
4. Anna Blinkova (semifinals)
5. (Switzerland) Ylena In-Albon (second round)
6. (Switzerland) Susan Bandecchi (second round)
7. Marina Melnikova (first round)
8. (Bosnia and Herzegovina) Dea Herdželaš (semifinals)

== Draw ==
=== Key ===
- Q = Qualifier
- WC = Wild card
- LL = Lucky loser
- Alt = Alternate
- SE = Special exempt
- PR = Protected ranking
- ITF = ITF entry
- JE = Junior exempt
- w/o = Walkover
- r = Retired
- d = Defaulted
- SR = Special ranking

=== Finals ===
Semifinals
1	(Georgia (country)) Ekaterine Gorgodze	7	6
8	(Bosnia and Herzegovina) Dea Herdželaš	5	1
4	Anna Blinkova	4	0
Q	(Cyprus) Raluca Șerban	6	6

Final
1	(Georgia (country)) Ekaterine Gorgodze	3	0
Q	(Cyprus) Raluca Șerban	6	6

=== Top half ===
First round
1	(Georgia (country)) E Gorgodze	6	7
WC	(Switzerland) L Küng	0	5
(France) E Jacquemot	6	6
Q	(Germany) L Papadakis	4	4
E Andreeva	6	4	6
(France) C Monnet	2	6	4
WC	(Switzerland) S Scilipoti	1	2
5	(Switzerland) Y In-Albon	6	6
3	(Slovenia) P Hercog	4
(Italy) C Ferrando	1^{r}
Q	(Czech Republic) J Marková	6	6
Q	(Germany) Y Morderger	4	1
WC	(Switzerland) C Naef	2	1
Q	(Serbia) N Stevanović	6	6
O Selekhmeteva	6	3	4
8	(Bosnia and Herzegovina) D Herdželaš	3	6	6

Second round
1	(Georgia (country)) E Gorgodze	5	6	7
(France) E Jacquemot	7	2	5
E Andreeva	6	6
5	(Switzerland) Y In-Albon	1	3
3	(Slovenia) P Hercog	6	6
Q	(Czech Republic) J Marková	2	1
Q	(Serbia) N Stevanović	5	6	5
8	(Bosnia and Herzegovina) D Herdželaš	7	3	7

Quarterfinals
1	(Georgia (country)) E Gorgodze	7	4	6
E Andreeva	5	6	2
3	(Slovenia) P Hercog	3	6	4
8	(Bosnia and Herzegovina) D Herdželaš	6	1	6

Semifinals
1	(Georgia (country)) E Gorgodze	7	6
8	(Bosnia and Herzegovina) D Herdželaš	5	1

=== Bottom half ===
First round
6	(Switzerland) S Bandecchi	6	3	6
Q	(Italy) F Arcidiacono	4	6	2
(Switzerland) J Züger	2	3
(Switzerland) S Waltert	6	6
(Switzerland) C Perrin	7	2	3
(Spain) I Burillo Escorihuela	5	6	6
WC	(Switzerland) A Granwehr	2	3
4	A Blinkova	6	6
7	M Melnikova	5	2
Q	(Cyprus) R Șerban	7	6
N Vikhlyantseva	3	4
PR	(Liechtenstein) K von Deichmann	6	6
Q	(France) A Ramé	7	6
Q	(Czech Republic) M Kolodziejová	5	2
(Spain) A Lázaro García	4	4
2	(France) F Ferro	6	6

Second round
6	(Switzerland) S Bandecchi	5	6^{5}
(Switzerland) S Waltert	7	7^{7}
(Spain) I Burillo Escorihuela	2	3
4	A Blinkova	6	6
Q	(Cyprus) R Șerban	6	6
PR	(Liechtenstein) K von Deichmann	1	1
Q	(France) A Ramé	6	4	6
2	(France) F Ferro	2	6	2

Quarterfinals
(Switzerland) S Waltert	6^{4}	2
4	A Blinkova	7^{7}	6
Q	(Cyprus) R Șerban	2	7^{7}	6
Q	(France) A Ramé	6	6^{5}	0

Semifinals
4	A Blinkova	4	0
Q	(Cyprus) R Șerban	6	6
