= 2024 Bellinzona Ladies Open =

Tennis tournament

- Date: 8–14 April 2024
- Edition: 4th
- Category: ITF Women's World Tennis Tour
- Prize money: $60,000
- Surface: Clay / Outdoor
- Location: Bellinzona, Switzerland

Champions

Singles
- (France) Loïs Boisson

Doubles
- (Czech Republic) Jesika Malečková / (Switzerland) Conny Perrin
← 2023 ·	Bellinzona Ladies Open	· 2025 →

The 2024 Bellinzona Ladies Open was a professional tennis tournament played on outdoor clay courts. It was the fourth edition of the tournament, which was part of the 2024 ITF Women's World Tennis Tour. It took place in Bellinzona, Switzerland, between 8 and 14 April 2024.

== Champions ==
=== Singles ===
- (France) Loïs Boisson def. (Hungary) Anna Bondár, 6–3, 2–6, 6–4

=== Doubles ===
- (Czech Republic) Jesika Malečková / (Switzerland) Conny Perrin def. (United States) Carmen Corley / (United States) Ivana Corley, 6–7^{(4–7)}, 7–6^{(9–7)}, [10–7]

== Singles main draw entrants ==
=== Seeds ===
Country	Player	Rank	Seed
USA	Kayla Day	84	1
~~BEL~~	~~Yanina Wickmayer~~	~~90~~	~~2~~
HUN	Anna Bondár	112	3
ITA	Lucrezia Stefanini	147	4
FRA	Chloé Paquet	154	5
HUN	Panna Udvardy	161	6
PHI	Alex Eala	172	7
ROU	Irina Bara	178	8

- Rankings are as of 1 April 2024.

=== Other entrants ===
The following players received wildcards into the singles main draw:

- (Switzerland) Susan Bandecchi
- (Switzerland) Alina Granwehr
- (Switzerland) Karolina Kozakova
- (Switzerland) Katerina Tsygourova

The following player received entry into the singles main draw using a special ranking:

- (Romania) Irina Fetecău

The following players received entry from the qualifying draw:

- (United Kingdom) Emily Appleton
- (Italy) Jessica Bertoldo
- (Italy) Martina Colmegna
- (Switzerland) Jenny Dürst
- (Czech Republic) Jesika Malečková
- (France) Amandine Monnot
- (Germany) Tayisiya Morderger
- (Germany) Lena Papadakis

The following player received entry as a lucky loser:

- (Czech Republic) Aneta Kučmová
