= 2023 Bellinzona Ladies Open – Doubles =

Doubles
- 2023 Bellinzona Ladies Open

Final
- Champions: (Switzerland) Conny Perrin (Czech Republic) Anna Sisková
- Runners-up: (United Kingdom) Freya Christie (United Kingdom) Ali Collins
- Score: 3–6, 7–6^{(11–9)}, [10–5]

Events
| Singles | Doubles |
| ← 2022 · | Bellinzona Ladies Open | · 2024 → |

Alicia Barnett and Olivia Nicholls were the defending champions but chose not to participate.

Conny Perrin and Anna Sisková won the title, defeating Freya Christie and Ali Collins in the final, 3–6, 7–6^{(11–9)}, [10–5].

== Seeds ==
1. (United Kingdom) Freya Christie / (United Kingdom) Ali Collins (final)
2. (Slovenia) Dalila Jakupović / (Slovenia) Nika Radišić (quarterfinals)
3. (United Kingdom) Emily Appleon / (Germany) Julia Lohoff (quarterfinals)
4. (Switzerland) Conny Perrin / (Czech Republic) Anna Sisková (champions)

== Draw ==
=== Key ===
- Q = Qualifier
- WC = Wild card
- LL = Lucky loser
- Alt = Alternate
- SE = Special exempt
- PR = Protected ranking
- ITF = ITF entry
- JE = Junior exempt
- w/o = Walkover
- r = Retired
- d = Defaulted
- SR = Special ranking

First round
1 | (United Kingdom) F Christie (United Kingdom) A Collins | 4 | 6 | [11]
(Czech Republic) M Bayerlová (Sweden) J Cabaj Awad | 6 | 4 | [9]
(France) E Cascino (France) C Monnet | 6 | 6
(Romania) O Gavrilă (Latvia) D Semeņistaja | 3 | 2
3 | (United Kingdom) E Appleton (Germany) J Lohoff | 4 | 6 | [10]
WC | (Switzerland) J Dürst (Switzerland) F Ganz | 6 | 4 | [4]
WC | (Switzerland) A Granwehr (Switzerland) K Kozakova | 2 | 0
(Switzerland) X Knoll (Switzerland) C Naef | 6 | 6
(Spain) Á Fita Boluda (Spain) L Romero Gormaz | 6 | 6
(Japan) M Ayukawa (United Kingdom) E Webley-Smith | 1 | 1
(Belgium) M Benoît (Cyprus) R Șerban | 5 | 6 | [5]
4 | (Switzerland) C Perrin (Czech Republic) A Sisková | 7 | 4 | [10]
(Italy) A Moratelli (Serbia) N Stevanović | 6 | 5 | [7]
(Greece) V Grammatikopoulou; A Tikhonova | 4 | 7 | [10]
WC | (Switzerland) L Selishta (Switzerland) K Tsygourova | 1 | 1
2 | (Slovenia) D Jakupović (Slovenia) N Radišić | 6 | 6

Quarterfinals
1 | (United Kingdom) F Christie (United Kingdom) A Collins | 6 | 7
(France) E Cascino (France) C Monnet | 4 | 5
3 | (United Kingdom) E Appleton (Germany) J Lohoff | 3 | 3
(Switzerland) X Knoll (Switzerland) C Naef | 6 | 6
(Spain) Á Fita Boluda (Spain) L Romero Gormaz | 7 | 3 | [6]
4 | (Switzerland) C Perrin (Czech Republic) A Sisková | 5 | 6 | [10]
(Greece) V Grammatikopoulou; A Tikhonova | 6 | 6
2 | (Slovenia) D Jakupović (Slovenia) N Radišić | 2 | 2

Semifinals
1 | (United Kingdom) F Christie (United Kingdom) A Collins | 6 | 7
(Switzerland) X Knoll (Switzerland) C Naef | 2 | 5
4 | (Switzerland) C Perrin (Czech Republic) A Sisková | 6 | 6
(Greece) V Grammatikopoulou; A Tikhonova | 3 | 1

Final
1 | (United Kingdom) F Christie (United Kingdom) A Collins | 6 | 6^{9} | [5]
4 | (Switzerland) C Perrin (Czech Republic) A Sisková | 3 | 7^{11} | [10]
