= 2021 ITF Women's World Tennis Tour – Bellinzona – Doubles =

Bellinzona – Doubles
- 2021 ITF Women's World Tennis Tour – Bellinzona

Final
- Champions: (Kazakhstan) Anna Danilina (Georgia (country)) Ekaterine Gorgodze
- Runners-up: (Canada) Rebecca Marino (Japan) Yuki Naito
- Score: 7–5, 6–3

Events
Singles	Doubles
ITF Women's World Tennis Tour – Bellinzona	· 2022 →

This was the first edition of the tournament.

Anna Danilina and Ekaterine Gorgodze won the title, defeating Rebecca Marino and Yuki Naito in the final, 7–5, 6–3.

== Seeds ==
1. (Belarus) Lidziya Marozava / (Romania) Andreea Mitu (quarterfinals)
2. (Germany) Mona Barthel / (Switzerland) Xenia Knoll (first round)
3. (Kazakhstan) Anna Danilina / (Georgia (country)) Ekaterine Gorgodze (champions)
4. (Hungary) Anna Bondár / (Hungary) Dalma Gálfi (withdrew)

== Draw ==
=== Key ===
- Q = Qualifier
- WC = Wild card
- LL = Lucky loser
- Alt = Alternate
- ITF = ITF entry
- PR = Protected ranking
- SR = Special ranking
- SE = Special exempt
- JE = Junior exempt
- JR = Junior Accelerator Programme entrant
- CO = College Accelerator Programme entrant
- NG = Next Gen Accelerator Program entrant
- w/o = Walkover
- r = Retired
- d = Defaulted

=== Draw ===
First round
1	(Belarus) L Marozava (Romania) A Mitu	7	6
(Hungary) RL Jani (Belgium) K Zimmermann	5	2
(Czech Republic) A Dețiuc (Czech Republic) J Marková	6	6
WC	(Switzerland) L Airoldi (Switzerland) Y In-Albon	2	3
3	(Kazakhstan) A Danilina (Georgia (country)) E Gorgodze	6	6
WC	(Switzerland) J Dürst (Switzerland) S Scilipoti	2	2
WC	(Switzerland) S Ochsner (Switzerland) J Züger	4	3
(Ukraine) A Kalinina (Russia) V Savinykh	6	6
(Croatia) J Fett (China) Jia Lu	3	1
(Romania) E-G Ruse (China) Xiy Wang	6	6
(Canada) R Marino (Japan) Y Naito	6	6
Alt	(Romania) LI Paar (Cyprus) R Șerban	3	4
(South Korea) J-h Choi (South Korea) N-l Han	6^{3}	3
(Germany) V Heisen (United Kingdom) E Webley-Smith	7^{7}	6
(Bulgaria) I Shinikova (United Kingdom) E Silva	6	7^{7}
2	(Germany) M Barthel (Switzerland) X Knoll	1	6^{5}

Quarterfinals
1	(Belarus) L Marozava (Romania) A Mitu	6^{4}	6	[8]
(Czech Republic) A Dețiuc (Czech Republic) J Marková	7^{7}	3	[10]
3	(Kazakhstan) A Danilina (Georgia (country)) E Gorgodze	7^{7}	6
(Ukraine) A Kalinina (Russia) V Savinykh	6^{1}	4
(Romania) E-G Ruse (China) Xiy Wang	3	6	[7]
(Canada) R Marino (Japan) Y Naito	6	2	[10]
(Germany) V Heisen (United Kingdom) E Webley-Smith	6	6
(Bulgaria) I Shinikova (United Kingdom) E Silva	2	3

Semifinals
(Czech Republic) A Dețiuc (Czech Republic) J Marková	2	2
3	(Kazakhstan) A Danilina (Georgia (country)) E Gorgodze	6	6
(Canada) R Marino (Japan) Y Naito	6	6
(Germany) V Heisen (United Kingdom) E Webley-Smith	3	2

Final
3	(Kazakhstan) A Danilina (Georgia (country)) E Gorgodze	7	6
(Canada) R Marino (Japan) Y Naito	5	3
