= 2024 Bellinzona Ladies Open – Singles =

Singles
- 2024 Bellinzona Ladies Open

Final
- Champion: (France) Loïs Boisson
- Runner-up: (Hungary) Anna Bondár
- Score: 6–3, 2–6, 6–4

Events
Singles	Doubles
← 2023 ·	Bellinzona Ladies Open	· 2025 →

Mirra Andreeva was the defending champion but chose not to participate.

Loïs Boisson won the title, defeating Anna Bondár in the final, 6–3, 2–6, 6–4.

== Seeds ==
1. (United States) Kayla Day (semifinals)
2. (Belgium) Yanina Wickmayer (withdrew)
3. (Hungary) Anna Bondár (final)
4. (Italy) Lucrezia Stefanini (quarterfinals)
5. (France) Chloé Paquet (semifinals)
6. (Hungary) Panna Udvardy (second round)
7. (Philippines) Alex Eala (first round)
8. (Romania) Irina Bara (second round)

== Draw ==
=== Key ===
- Q = Qualifier
- WC = Wild card
- LL = Lucky loser
- Alt = Alternate
- SE = Special exempt
- PR = Protected ranking
- ITF = ITF entry
- JE = Junior exempt
- w/o = Walkover
- r = Retired
- d = Defaulted
- SR = Special ranking

=== Finals ===
Semifinals
1	(United States) Kayla Day	2	5
3	(Hungary) Anna Bondár	6	7
5	(France) Chloé Paquet	2	6	1
(France) Loïs Boisson	6	3	6

Final
3	(Hungary) Anna Bondár	3	6	4
(France) Loïs Boisson	6	2	6

=== Top half ===
First round
1	(United States) K Day	6	6
WC	(Switzerland) K Tsygourova	2	2
(France) C Monnet	4	0
Q	(Switzerland) J Dürst	6	6
(Netherlands) L Pattinama Kerkhove	6	6^{7}	6
Q	(Italy) M Colmegna	2	7^{9}	2
Q	(Germany) T Morderger	7	3	1
8	(Romania) I Bara	5	6	6
3	(Hungary) A Bondár	6	6
WC	(Switzerland) K Kozakova	3	1
LL	(Czech Republic) A Kučmová	1	5
Q	(Czech Republic) J Malečková	6	7
WC	(Switzerland) S Bandecchi	6	6
J Avdeeva	4	0
SR	(Romania) I Fetecău	6	3	1
6	(Hungary) P Udvardy	4	6	6

Second round
1	(United States) K Day	1	7	6
Q	(Switzerland) J Dürst	6	5	3
(Netherlands) L Pattinama Kerkhove	2	6	6
8	(Romania) I Bara	6	4	2
3	(Hungary) A Bondár	6	6
Q	(Czech Republic) J Malečková	3	3
WC	(Switzerland) S Bandecchi	2	6	6
6	(Hungary) P Udvardy	6	3	3

Quarterfinals
1	(United States) K Day	6	6^{3}	6
(Netherlands) L Pattinama Kerkhove	0	7^{7}	3
3	(Hungary) A Bondár	6	6
WC	(Switzerland) S Bandecchi	4	4

Semifinals
1	(United States) K Day	2	5
3	(Hungary) A Bondár	6	7

=== Bottom half ===
First round
5	(France) C Paquet	6	6
Q	(Italy) J Bertoldo	4	2
(Czech Republic) N Bartůňková	6	7^{7}
Q	(France) A Monnot	2	6^{3}
(Uzbekistan) N Abduraimova	1	6	6
(Germany) M Barthel	6	4	3
Q	(United Kingdom) E Appleton	1	5
4	(Italy) L Stefanini	6	7
7	(Philippines) A Eala	3	1
(France) S Janicijevic	6	6
(Liechtenstein) K von Deichmann	2	1
(France) L Boisson	6	6
WC	(Switzerland) A Granwehr	1	3
(Serbia) D Radanović	6	6
(Slovenia) D Jakupović	6	6
Q	(Germany) L Papadakis	4	2

Second round
5	(France) C Paquet	2	6	7^{9}
(Czech Republic) N Bartůňková	6	3	6^{7}
(Uzbekistan) N Abduraimova	3	2
4	(Italy) L Stefanini	6	6
(France) S Janicijevic	2	2
(France) L Boisson	6	6
(Serbia) D Radanović	6	7^{10}
(Slovenia) D Jakupović	0	6^{8}

Quarterfinals
5	(France) C Paquet	6	6
4	(Italy) L Stefanini	4	1
(France) L Boisson	6	6
(Serbia) D Radanović	3	1

Semifinals
5	(France) C Paquet	2	6	1
(France) L Boisson	6	3	6
