= 2024 Bellinzona Ladies Open – Doubles =

Doubles
- 2024 Bellinzona Ladies Open

Final
- Champions: (Czech Republic) Jesika Malečková (Switzerland) Conny Perrin
- Runners-up: (United States) Carmen Corley (United States) Ivana Corley
- Score: 6–7^{(4–7)}, 7–6^{(9–7)}, [10–7]

Events
Singles	Doubles
← 2023 ·	Bellinzona Ladies Open	· 2025 →

Conny Perrin and Anna Sisková were the defending champions but Sisková chose to participate at Zaragoza instead.

Perrin partnered alongside Jesika Malečková and successfully defended her title, defeating Carmen Corley and Ivana Corley in the final, 6–7^{(4–7)}, 7–6^{(9–7)}, [10–7].

== Seeds ==
1. (Romania) Irina Bara / (Slovenia) Dalila Jakupović (quarterfinals, withdrew)
2. (Czech Republic) Jesika Malečková / (Switzerland) Conny Perrin (champions)
3. (Philippines) Alex Eala / (Belgium) Yanina Wickmayer (first round, withdrew)
4. (United States) Carmen Corley / (United States) Ivana Corley (final)

== Draw ==
=== Key ===
- Q = Qualifier
- WC = Wild card
- LL = Lucky loser
- Alt = Alternate
- SE = Special exempt
- PR = Protected ranking
- ITF = ITF entry
- JE = Junior exempt
- w/o = Walkover
- r = Retired
- d = Defaulted
- SR = Special ranking

First round
(Uzbekistan) N Abduraimova (France) C Monnet	6	6
(Switzerland) Z Kägi (Switzerland) C Talleri	4	3
4	(United States) C Corley (United States) I Corley	6	6
(Germany) A Gabric (Romania) AG Vasilescu	2	3
(Switzerland) A Lazic (Switzerland) L Selishta	w/o
(Switzerland) S Bandecchi (Malta) F Curmi
(Switzerland) A Granwehr (Switzerland) K Tsygourova	6^{13}	4
(Italy) M Colmegna (Czech Republic) A Kučmová	7^{15}	6
(United Kingdom) E Appleton (Germany) L Papadakis	w/o
3	(Philippines) A Eala (Belgium) Y Wickmayer
(Germany) T Morderger (Germany) Y Morderger	6	3	[10]
(Switzerland) K Kozakova (Australia) TN Smith	1	6	[5]
(Switzerland) J Dürst (Slovenia) N Radišić	6	5	[7]
2	(Czech Republic) J Malečková (Switzerland) C Perrin	4	7	[10]

Quarterfinals
1	(Romania) I Bara (Slovenia) D Jakupović
(Uzbekistan) N Abduraimova (France) C Monnet	w/o
4	(United States) C Corley (United States) I Corley	6	6
(Switzerland) A Lazic (Switzerland) L Selishta	0	0
(Italy) M Colmegna (Czech Republic) A Kučmová	4	4
(United Kingdom) E Appleton (Germany) L Papadakis	6	6
(Germany) T Morderger (Germany) Y Morderger	1	4
2	(Czech Republic) J Malečková (Switzerland) C Perrin	6	6

Semifinals
(Uzbekistan) N Abduraimova (France) C Monnet	3	4
4	(United States) C Corley (United States) I Corley	6	6
(United Kingdom) E Appleton (Germany) L Papadakis	3	4
2	(Czech Republic) J Malečková (Switzerland) C Perrin	6	6

Final
4	(United States) C Corley (United States) I Corley	7^{7}	6^{7}	[7]
2	(Czech Republic) J Malečková (Switzerland) C Perrin	6^{4}	7^{9}	[10]
