= 2026 Memorial Eugenio Fontana – Doubles =

Doubles
- 2026 Memorial Eugenio Fontana

Final
- Champions: (Spain) Yvonne Cavallé Reimers (Belgium) Lara Salden
- Runners-up: (Georgia (country)) Ekaterine Gorgodze (Switzerland) Naïma Karamoko
- Score: 6–3, 6–4

Details
- Draw: 8 (1WC)
- Seeds: 2

Events
Singles	Doubles
- Memorial Eugenio Fontana

This was the first edition of the tournament.

Yvonne Cavallé Reimers and Lara Salden won the title, defeating Ekaterine Gorgodze and Naïma Karamoko 6–3, 6–4 in the final.

== Seeds ==
1. (Argentina) Nicole Fossa Huergo / (Slovenia) Nika Radišić (semifinals)
2. (Chinese Taipei) Cho I-hsuan / (Chinese Taipei) Cho Yi-tsen (semifinals)

== Draw ==
Key

- Q = Qualifier
- WC = Wild card
- LL = Lucky loser
- Alt = Alternate
- ITF = ITF entry
- PR = Protected ranking
- SR = Special ranking
- SE = Special exempt
- JE = Junior exempt
- JR = Junior Accelerator Programme entrant
- CO = College Accelerator Programme entrant
- NG = Next Gen Accelerator Program entrant
- w/o = Walkover
- r = Retired
- d = Defaulted

=== Draw ===
Quarterfinals
1	(Argentina) N Fossa Huergo (Slovenia) N Radišić	7	6
(Andorra) V Jiménez Kasintseva (China) X You	5	3
(Georgia (country)) E Gorgodze (Switzerland) N Karamoko	7	6
WC	(Italy) N Basiletti (Italy) G Pedone	5	4
(India) R Bhosale (France) E Cascino	6	4	[11]
(Spain) Y Cavallé Reimers (Belgium) L Salden	3	7	[13]
(Italy) N Brancaccio (Italy) L Pigato	6	2	[7]
2	(Chinese Taipei) I-h Cho (Chinese Taipei) Y-t Cho	4	6	[10]

Semifinals
1	(Argentina) N Fossa Huergo (Slovenia) N Radišić	4	5
(Georgia (country)) E Gorgodze (Switzerland) N Karamoko	6	7
(Spain) Y Cavallé Reimers (Belgium) L Salden	6	6^{1}	[10]
2	(Chinese Taipei) I-h Cho (Chinese Taipei) Y-t Cho	4	7^{7}	[7]

Final
(Georgia (country)) E Gorgodze (Switzerland) N Karamoko	3	4
(Spain) Y Cavallé Reimers (Belgium) L Salden	6	6
