= Memorial Eugenio Fontana =

- 2026 Memorial Eugenio Fontana

WTA 125
- Event name: Memorial Eugenio Fontana
- Location: Modena, Italy
- Venue: Club La Meridiana
- Category: WTA 125
- Surface: Clay
- Draw: 32S/8Q/8D
- Prize money: €100,000

Current champions (2026)
- Singles: (Poland) Katarzyna Kawa
- Doubles: (Spain) Yvonne Cavallé Reimers (Belgium) Lara Salden

The Memorial Eugenio Fontana is a tournament for professional female tennis players played on outdoor clay courts. The event is classified as a WTA 125 tournament and is held at the Club La Meridiana in Modena, Italy. The tournament was introduced in 2026 after staging three editions on the ATP Challenger Tour between 2023 and 2025 covered under the Modena Challenger.

== Past finals ==
=== Singles ===
| Year | Champion | Runners-up | Score |
|---|---|---|---|
| 2026 | (Poland) Katarzyna Kawa | (Italy) Lucia Bronzetti | 6–1, 4–6, 7–6^{(8–6)} |

=== Doubles ===
| Year | Champions | Runners-up | Score |
|---|---|---|---|
| 2026 | (Spain) Yvonne Cavallé Reimers (Belgium) Lara Salden | (Georgia (country)) Ekaterine Gorgodze (Switzerland) Naïma Karamoko | 6–3, 6–4 |
