= 2026 Memorial Eugenio Fontana – Singles =

Singles
- 2026 Memorial Eugenio Fontana

Final
- Champion: (Poland) Katarzyna Kawa
- Runner-up: (Italy) Lucia Bronzetti
- Score: 6–1, 4–6, 7–6^{(8–6)}

Details
- Draw: 32 (4Q / 4WC)
- Seeds: 8

Events
| Singles | Doubles |
- Memorial Eugenio Fontana

This was the first edition of the tournament. Katarzyna Kawa won the title, defeating Lucia Bronzetti in the final, 6–1, 4–6, 7–6^{(8–6)}.

== Seeds ==
1. (Andorra) Victoria Jiménez Kasintseva (semifinals)
2. (Latvia) Darja Semeņistaja (second round)
3. (Czech Republic) Dominika Šalková (quarterfinals)
4. (Austria) Julia Grabher (second round)
5. (Spain) Kaitlin Quevedo (quarterfinals)
6. (Egypt) Mayar Sherif (second round)
7. (Slovenia) Tamara Zidanšek (second round)
8. (Italy) Lisa Pigato (first round)

== Draw ==
Key

- Q = Qualifier
- WC = Wild card
- LL = Lucky loser
- Alt = Alternate
- ITF = ITF entry
- PR = Protected ranking
- SR = Special ranking
- SE = Special exempt
- JE = Junior exempt
- JR = Junior Accelerator Programme entrant
- CO = College Accelerator Programme entrant
- NG = Next Gen Accelerator Program entrant
- w/o = Walkover
- r = Retired
- d = Defaulted

=== Finals ===
Semifinals
1 | (Andorra) Victoria Jiménez Kasintseva | 6 | 4 | 3
(Poland) Katarzyna Kawa | 2 | 6 | 6
(Italy) Lucia Bronzetti | 7^{7} | 6
(Czech Republic) Laura Samson | 6^{3} | 1

Final
(Poland) Katarzyna Kawa | 6 | 4 | 7^{8}
(Italy) Lucia Bronzetti | 1 | 6 | 6^{6}

=== Top half ===
First round
1 | (Andorra) V Jiménez Kasintseva | 6 | 6
(Italy) J Pieri | 2 | 4
Q | (Italy) N Basiletti | 2 | 3
(United States) V Lepchenko | 6 | 6
(Spain) L Romero Gormaz | 6 | 6
(China) X You | 4 | 1
WC | (Italy) G Pedone | 2 | 0
6 | (Egypt) M Sherif | 6 | 6
3 | (Czech Republic) D Šalková | 6 | 3 | 6
(France) A Tubello | 1 | 6 | 4
WC | (Italy) M Trevisan | 6 | 6
WC | (Italy) J Ruggeri | 0 | 3
(Germany) N Noha Akugue | 6 | 6
Q | (France) T Rakotomanga Rajaonah | 4 | 4
(Poland) K Kawa | 6 | 6
8 | (Italy) L Pigato | 4 | 4

Second round
1 | (Andorra) V Jiménez Kasintseva | 6 | 6
(United States) V Lepchenko | 2 | 2
(Spain) L Romero Gormaz | 6 | 6
6 | (Egypt) M Sherif | 4 | 2
3 | (Czech Republic) D Šalková | 6 | 7^{7}
WC | (Italy) M Trevisan | 1 | 6^{5}
(Germany) N Noha Akugue | 6^{4} | 1
(Poland) K Kawa | 7^{7} | 6

Quarterfinals
1 | (Andorra) V Jiménez Kasintseva | 6 | 7^{7}
(Spain) L Romero Gormaz | 3 | 6^{3}
3 | (Czech Republic) D Šalková | 1 | 1
(Poland) K Kawa | 6 | 6

Semifinals
1 | (Andorra) V Jiménez Kasintseva | 6 | 4 | 3
(Poland) K Kawa | 2 | 6 | 6

=== Bottom half ===
First round
7 | (Slovenia) T Zidanšek | 7 | 6
WC | (Italy) F Urgesi | 5 | 0
Q | (Argentina) V Bosio | 4 | 5
(Italy) N Brancaccio | 6 | 7
(China) X Gao | 6 | 3 | 1
(Italy) L Bronzetti | 4 | 6 | 6
(Spain) A Lázaro García | 4 | 2
4 | (Austria) J Grabher | 6 | 6
5 | (Spain) K Quevedo | 6 | 6
Q | (Argentina) J Ortenzi | 3 | 4
(Belgium) J Vandromme | 6 | 6
(Spain) Á Fita Boluda | 4 | 3
(China) Xiy Wang | 6^{3} | 5
(Czech Republic) L Samson | 7^{7} | 7
(Spain) M Bassols Ribera | 3 | 6 | 5
2 | (Latvia) D Semeņistaja | 6 | 2 | 7

Second round
7 | (Slovenia) T Zidanšek | 2 | 2
(Italy) N Brancaccio | 6 | 6
(Italy) L Bronzetti | 7^{8} | 7^{7}
4 | (Austria) J Grabher | 6^{6} | 6^{4}
5 | (Spain) K Quevedo | 6 | 3 | 6
(Belgium) J Vandromme | 3 | 6 | 4
(Czech Republic) L Samson | 6 | 7
2 | (Latvia) D Semeņistaja | 2 | 5

Quarterfinals
(Italy) N Brancaccio | 4 | 2
(Italy) L Bronzetti | 6 | 6
5 | (Spain) K Quevedo | 3 | 4
(Czech Republic) L Samson | 6 | 6

Semifinals
(Italy) L Bronzetti | 7^{7} | 6
(Czech Republic) L Samson | 6^{3} | 1

== Qualifying ==
=== Seeds ===
1. (France) Tiantsoa Rakotomanga Rajaonah (qualified)
2. (Argentina) Jazmin Ortenzi (qualified)
3. (Argentina) Victoria Bosio (qualified)
4. (Italy) Noemi Basiletti (qualified)

=== Qualifiers ===
1. (France) Tiantsoa Rakotomanga Rajaonah
2. (Argentina) Jazmin Ortenzi
3. (Argentina) Victoria Bosio
4. (Italy) Noemi Basiletti

==== First qualifier ====
| Qualifying competition |
| 1 | (France) Tiantsoa Rakotomanga Rajaonah | 6 | 5 | 6 |
| | (France) Chloé Paquet | 2 | 7 | 3 |

==== Second qualifier ====
| Qualifying competition |
| 2 | (Argentina) Jazmin Ortenzi | 0 | 7 | 6 |
| WC | (Italy) Viola Turini | 6 | 5 | 0 |

==== Third qualifier ====
| Qualifying competition |
| 3 | (Argentina) Victoria Bosio | 6 | 5 | 7^{9} |
| | (Italy) Francesca Pace | 2 | 7 | 6^{7} |

==== Fourth qualifier ====
| Qualifying competition |
| 4 | (Italy) Noemi Basiletti | 6 | 1 | 6 |
| WC | (Italy) Beatrice Ricci | 2 | 6 | 0 |
