= Yvonne Cavallé Reimers =

Spanish tennis player (born 1992)

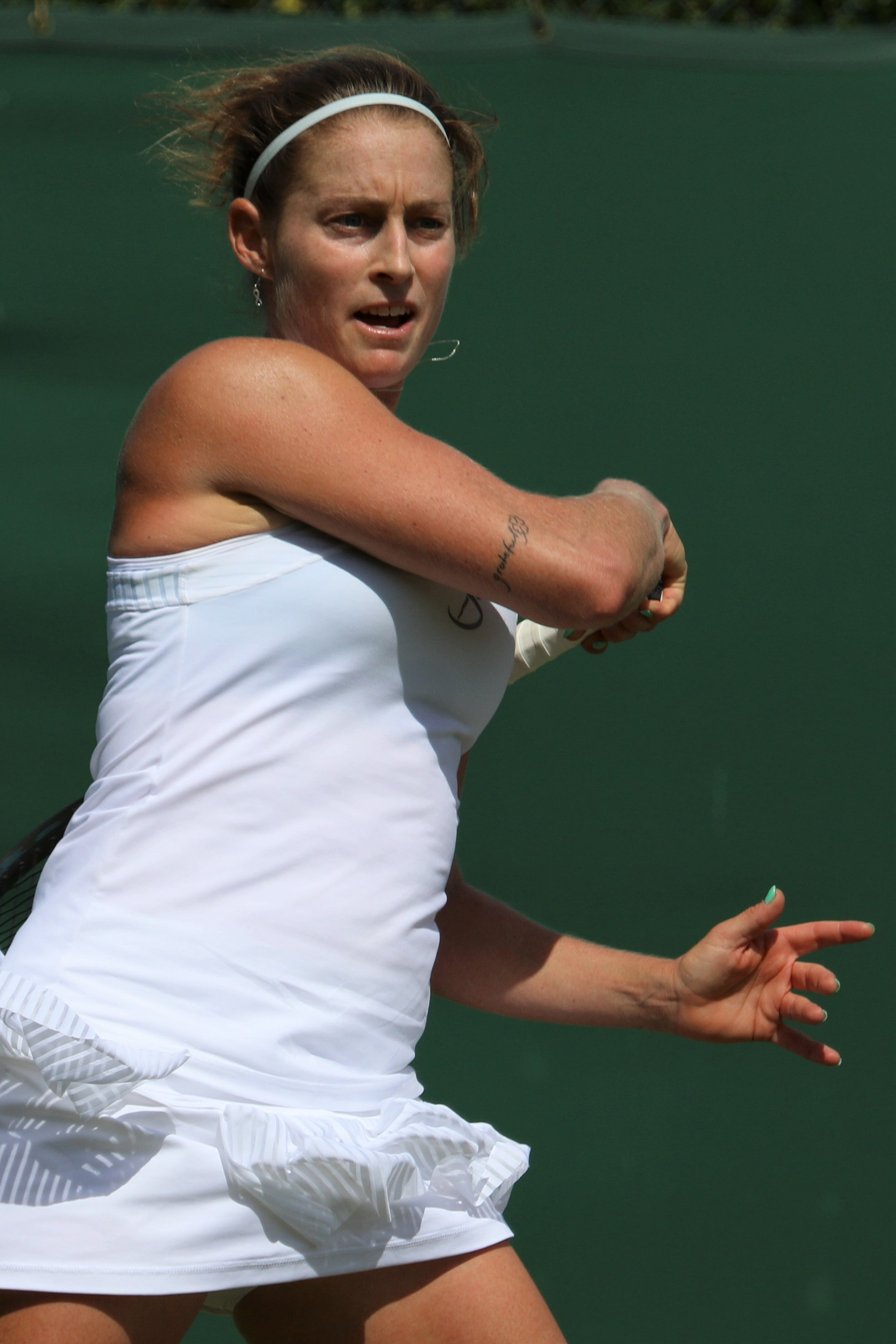
- Cavallé Reimers at the 2022 Wimbledon Championships
- Country (sports): Spain
- Residence: Palma de Mallorca, Spain
- Born: 22 May 1992 (age 34) Palma de Mallorca
- Height: 1.69 m (5 ft 7 in)
- Turned pro: 2010
- Plays: Right (two-handed backhand)
- Prize money: $328,658

Singles
- Career record: 443–321
- Career titles: 7 ITF
- Highest ranking: No. 266 (11 July 2022)

Grand Slam singles results
- Wimbledon: Q1 (2022)

Doubles
- Career record: 379–272
- Career titles: 1 WTA 125
- Highest ranking: No. 73 (23 June 2025)
- Current ranking: No. 97 (3 August 2026)

Grand Slam doubles results
- Australian Open: 1R (2025)
- French Open: 1R (2025)
- Wimbledon: 1R (2025)
- US Open: 1R (2025)
- Last updated on: 14 August 2026.

Yvonne Cavallé Reimers (born 22 May 1992) is a Spanish tennis player. She has career-high WTA rankings of No. 73 in doubles, achieved 23 June 2025, and No. 266 in singles, set on 11 July 2022.

Cavallé Reimers has won one WTA 125 doubles title, as well as seven singles titles and 33 doubles titles on the ITF Women's Circuit.

== Career ==
Cavallé Reimers made her WTA Tour main-draw debut at the 2022 Morocco Open when she received entry into the doubles draw, partnering Irene Burillo Escorihuela.

She reached her first WTA Tour final at the 2024 Palermo Ladies Open with Aurora Zantedeschi, losing to Alexandra Panova and Yana Sizikova.

Following a semifinal showing in doubles at the 2024 Guadalajara Open with Valeriya Strakhova, she reached the top 100 in the doubles rankings on 26 September 2024.

Partnering Emily Appleton, she made her French Open debut in May 2025, losing in the first round to Alexandra Eala and Renata Zarazúa.

Teaming up with Lara Salden, she won her first WTA 125 doubles title at the 2026 Memorial Eugenio Fontana, defeating Ekaterine Gorgodze and Naïma Karamoko in the final.

== WTA Tour finals ==
=== Doubles: 1 (runner-up) ===
Legend WTA 250 (0–1)	Finals by surface Clay (0–1)

Result	Date	Tournament	Tier	Surface	Partner	Opponents	Score
Loss	Jul 2024	Palermo Ladies Open, Italy	WTA 250	Clay	(Italy) Aurora Zantedeschi	(Russia) Alexandra Panova (Russia) Yana Sizikova	6–4, 3–6, [5–10]

== WTA 125 finals ==
=== Doubles: 7 (1 title, 6 runner-ups) ===
Result	W–L	Date	Tournament	Surface	Partner	Opponents	Score
Loss	0–1	Feb 2025	Cancún Open, Mexico	Hard	(Spain) Aliona Bolsova	(Australia) Maya Joint (Australia) Taylah Preston	4–6, 3–6
Loss	0–2	Jun 2025	Internacional de Valencia, Spain	Clay	(Spain) Ángela Fita Boluda	(Russia) Maria Kozyreva (Belarus) Iryna Shymanovich	3–6, 4–6
Win	1–2	Jun 2026	Memorial Eugenio Fontana, Italy	Clay	(Belgium) Lara Salden	(Georgia (country)) Ekaterine Gorgodze (Switzerland) Naïma Karamoko	6–3, 6–4
Loss	1–3	Jul 2026	Contrexéville Open, France	Clay	(Brazil) Laura Pigossi	(France) Estelle Cascino (Argentina) Nicole Fossa Huergo	7–6^{(3)}, 2–6, [6–10]
Loss	1–4	Jul 2026	Kitzbühel Ladies Open, Austria	Clay	(Brazil) Laura Pigossi	(United Kingdom) Alicia Barnett (France) Elixane Lechemia	4–6, 3–6
Loss	1–5	Jul 2026	Târgu Mureș Open, Romania	Clay	(Belgium) Lara Salden	(Croatia) Lucija Ćirić Bagarić (Italy) Angelica Moratelli	3–6, 6–1, [9–11]
Loss	1–6	Oct 2026	Mallorca Championships, Spain	Clay	(Brazil) Laura Pigossi	(Croatia) Lucija Ćirić Bagarić (Italy) Angelica Moratelli	6–2, 3–6, [10–12]

== ITF Circuit finals ==
Legend
W100 tournaments
W60/75 tournaments
W25/35 tournaments
W10/15 tournaments

=== Singles: 21 (7 titles, 14 runner-ups) ===
Result	W–L	Date	Location	Tier	Surface	Opponent	Score
Win	1–0	Jul 2011	Casablanca, Morocco	W10	Clay	(Mexico) Ximena Hermoso	7–5, 4–6, 6–3
Win	2–0	Jul 2011	El Jadida, Morocco	W10	Clay	(France) Sybille Gauvain	6–1, 6–0
Loss	2–1	Feb 2012	Mallorca, Spain	W10	Clay	(Georgia (country)) Sofia Kvatsabaia	2–6, 3–6
Loss	2–2	May 2012	Getxo, Spain	W10	Clay	(United Kingdom) Amanda Carreras	3–6, 6–4, 4–6
Loss	2–3	Feb 2013	Mallorca, Spain	W10	Clay	(Italy) Anastasia Grymalska	2–6, 6–7^{(2)}
Win	3–3	Mar 2014	Le Havre, France	W10	Clay	(Italy) Martina Colmegna	2–6, 6–4, 6–3
Loss	3–4	Apr 2014	Santa Margherita di Pula, Italy	W10	Clay	(Latvia) Jeļena Ostapenko	2–6, 5–7
Loss	3–5	Nov 2014	Nules, Spain	W10	Clay	(Spain) Olga Sáez Larra	2–6, 4–6
Win	4–5	Mar 2015	Palmanova, Spain	W10	Clay	(France) Joséphine Boualem	6–1, 6–2
Loss	4–6	May 2015	Santa Margherita di Pula, Italy	W25	Clay	(Belgium) Elise Mertens	6–7^{(6)}, 4–6
Loss	4–7	Apr 2017	Hammamet, Tunisia	W15	Clay	(Venezuela) Andrea Gámiz	2–6, 1–6
Loss	4–8	Jul 2017	Aschaffenburg, Germany	W25	Clay	(Germany) Katharina Hobgarski	5–7, 4–6
Loss	4–9	Apr 2018	Hammamet, Tunisia	W15	Clay	(Bulgaria) Isabella Shinikova	3–6, 5–7
Win	5–9	Jun 2019	Madrid, Spain	W15	Hard	(Romania) Ioana Loredana Roșca	7–6^{(4)}, 5–7, 7–6^{(3)}
Loss	5–10	Sep 2020	Melilla, Spain	W15	Clay	(United Kingdom) Matilda Mutavdzic	2–6, 5–7
Win	6–10	Oct 2020	Monastir, Tunisia	W15	Hard	(Argentina) María Lourdes Carlé	6–3, 7–6^{(4)}
Loss	6–11	Jan 2021	Mallorca, Spain	W15	Hard	(Philippines) Alex Eala	7–5, 1–6, 2–6
Loss	6–12	Jan 2021	Mallorca, Spain	W15	Hard	(Switzerland) Simona Waltert	2–6, 6–7^{(4)}
Win	7–12	Jan 2022	Mallorca, Spain	W25	Hard	(Turkey) İpek Öz	6–2, 6–2
Loss	7–13	Mar 2022	Palmanova, Spain	W15	Clay	(Spain) Jéssica Bouzas Maneiro	4–6, 1–6
Loss	7–14	May 2022	Monastir, Tunisia	W25	Hard	(Uzbekistan) Nigina Abduraimova	6–3, 2–6, 2–6

=== Doubles: 73 (33 titles, 40 runner-ups) ===
Result	W–L	Date	Tournament	Tier	Surface	Partner	Opponents	Score
Loss	0–1	Jul 2010	ITF Melilla, Spain	W10	Hard	(Russia) Margarita Lazareva	(Belgium) Gally De Wael (Russia) Elina Gasanova	0–6, 0–6
Loss	0–2	Sep 2010	ITF Madrid, Spain	W10	Hard	(Spain) Laura Apaolaza Miradevilla	(Germany) Lena-Marie Hofmann (Austria) Janina Toljan	6–7^{(6)}, 5–7
Win	1–2	Oct 2010	ITF St. Cugat, Spain	W10	Clay	(Spain) Carmen López Rueda	(Germany) Desiree Schelenz (Russia) Yana Sizikova	6–3, 7–5
Loss	1–3	Apr 2011	ITF Torrent, Spain	W10	Hard	(Spain) Isabel Rapisarda Calvo	(Czech Republic) Simona Dobrá (Czech Republic) Tereza Hladíková	4–6, 6–2, [4–10]
Loss	1–4	Jul 2011	ITF El Jadida, Morocco	W10	Clay	(Spain) Anna Montserrat Sánchez	(Spain) Carolina Prats Millán (Spain) Sheila Solsona Carcasona	2–6, 1–6
Win	2–4	Sep 2011	ITF Lleida, Spain	W10	Clay	(Spain) Isabel Rapisarda Calvo	(Spain) Arabela Fernández Rabener (Switzerland) Viktorija Golubic	6–2, 7–6^{(5)}
Loss	2–5	Nov 2011	ITF La Vall d'Uixó, Spain	W10	Clay	(Spain) Arabela Fernández Rabener	(Switzerland) Viktorija Golubic (Poland) Magdalena Kiszczyńska	5–7, 6–3, [8–10]
Win	3–5	Feb 2012	ITF Mallorca, Spain	W10	Clay	(Spain) Lucía Cervera Vázquez	(Italy) Alice Balducci (Germany) Anne Schäfer	7–5, 6–4
Win	4–5	Apr 2012	ITF Torrent, Spain	W10	Clay	(Spain) Isabel Rapisarda Calvo	(Belarus) Ksenia Milevskaya (Russia) Anastasia Mukhametova	4–6, 7–6^{(3)}, [10–8]
Loss	4–6	Jul 2012	ITF Woking, United Kingdom	W25	Hard	(United Kingdom) Nicola Slater	(Thailand) Nicha Lertpitaksinchai (Thailand) Peangtarn Plipuech	2–6, 5–7
Win	5–6	Sep 2012	ITF Lleida, Spain	W10	Clay	(Argentina) Tatiana Búa	(Sweden) Cornelia Lister (Italy) Chiara Mendo	6–2, 6–3
Loss	5–7	Sep 2012	ITF Madrid, Spain	W10	Clay	(Spain) Isabel Rapisarda Calvo	(Argentina) Tatiana Búa (Spain) Lucía Cervera Vázquez	6–3, 1–6, [7–10]
Loss	5–8	Sep 2012	ITF Madrid, Spain	W10	Clay	(Argentina) Tatiana Búa	(Denmark) Malou Ejdesgaard (Bulgaria) Aleksandrina Naydenova	7–5, 3–6, [3–10]
Win	6–8	May 2013	ITF Girona, Spain	W10	Clay	(Spain) Lucía Cervera Vázquez	(Italy) Gaia Sanesi (Italy) Giulia Sussarello	7–6^{(4)}, 6–4
Loss	6–9	Apr 2014	ITF Santa Margherita di Pula, Italy	W10	Clay	(Spain) Olga Sáez Larra	(Latvia) Jeļena Ostapenko (Netherlands) Rosalie van der Hoek	1–6, 6–2, [6–10]
Loss	6–10	Jun 2014	ITF Madrid, Spain	W10	Clay	(Spain) Lucía Cervera Vázquez	(Spain) Silvia García Jiménez (Spain) Olga Sáez Larra	4–6, 3–6
Win	7–10	Jun 2014	ITF Madrid, Spain	W10	Clay	(Spain) Lucía Cervera Vázquez	(Ecuador) Charlotte Römer (Spain) Olga Sáez Larra	6–2, 4–6, [10–5]
Win	8–10	Aug 2014	ITF Sharm El Sheikh, Egypt	W10	Clay	(Russia) Alina Mikheeva	(Germany) Linda Prenkovic (Hungary) Naomi Totka	6–3, 7–5
Loss	8–11	Sep 2014	ITF Lleida, Spain	W10	Clay	(Spain) Lucía Cervera Vázquez	(Ukraine) Elizaveta Ianchuk (Australia) Alexandra Nancarrow	1–6, 1–6
Loss	8–12	Sep 2014	ITF Madrid, Spain	W10	Hard	(Spain) Lucía Cervera Vázquez	(Spain) Inés Ferrer Suárez (Greece) Maria Sakkari	2–6, 6–3, [9–11]
Loss	8–13	Nov 2014	ITF Vinaroz, Spain	W10	Clay	(Italy) Alice Savoretti	(Belgium) Elke Lemmens (Spain) Ariadna Martí Riembau	3–6, 6–4, [9–11]
Loss	8–14	Nov 2014	ITF Nules, Spain	W10	Clay	(Spain) Aina Schaffner Riera	(Australia) Alexandra Nancarrow (Spain) Olga Sáez Larra	6–7^{(5)}, 6–7^{(5)}
Win	9–14	Jun 2015	ITF Lenzerheide, Switzerland	W25	Clay	(Switzerland) Karin Kennel	(Switzerland) Xenia Knoll (Germany) Antonia Lottner	w/o
Win	10–14	Aug 2016	ITF Las Palmas, Spain	W10	Clay	(Ecuador) Charlotte Römer	(Spain) Arabela Fernández Rabener (Spain) Almudena Sanz Llaneza	6–3, 6–4
Loss	10–15	Aug 2016	ITF Las Palmas, Spain	W10	Clay	(Ecuador) Charlotte Römer	(Sweden) Jacqueline Cabaj Awad (France) Marine Partaud	6–1, 5–7, [8–10]
Loss	10–16	Feb 2017	ITF Manacor, Spain	W15	Clay	(Ecuador) Charlotte Römer	(Spain) Olga Sáez Larra (Spain) María Teresa Torró Flor	3–6, 2–6
Loss	10–17	Feb 2017	ITF Palmanova, Spain	W15	Clay	(Spain) Olga Sáez Larra	(Germany) Katharina Gerlach (Germany) Katharina Hobgarski	4–6, 4–6
Win	11–17	Apr 2017	ITF Hammamet, Tunisia	W15	Clay	(Spain) Irene Burillo	(Ecuador) Charlotte Römer (Australia) Isabelle Wallace	6–4, 6–3
Loss	11–18	Apr 2017	ITF Santa Margherita di Pula, Italy	W25	Clay	(Spain) Irene Burillo	(India) Ankita Raina (Netherlands) Eva Wacanno	4–6, 4–6
Loss	11–19	Jul 2017	ITF Turin, Italy	W25	Clay	(Spain) Irene Burillo	(Spain) Estrella Cabeza Candela (Brazil) Paula Cristina Gonçalves	7–5, 0–6, [8–10]
Win	12–19	Oct 2017	ITF Riba-roja de Túria, Spain	W15	Clay	(Argentina) Guadalupe Pérez Rojas	(Spain) Estrella Cabeza Candela (Spain) Ángela Fita Boluda	6–4, 6–4
Win	13–19	Dec 2017	ITF Castellón, Spain	W15	Clay	(Brazil) Luisa Stefani	(China) Ren Jiaqi (China) Wang Xiyu	6–3, 6–1
Loss	13–20	Apr 2018	ITF Hammamet, Tunisia	W15	Clay	(Spain) Alba Carrillo Marín	(Bosnia and Herzegovina) Nefisa Berberović (Germany) Natalia Siedliska	6–7^{(5)}, 2–6
Loss	13–21	May 2018	ITF La Bisbal d'Empordà, Spain	W25	Clay	(United States) Chiara Scholl	(United States) Jamie Loeb (Mexico) Ana Sofía Sánchez	3–6, 2–6
Win	14–21	Jul 2018	ITF Getxo, Spain	W25	Clay	(Spain) Ángela Fita Boluda	(Spain) Marina Bassols Ribera (Spain) Guiomar Maristany	6–3, 6–2
Win	15–21	Jul 2018	ITF Figueira da Foz, Portugal	W25	Hard	(Venezuela) Andrea Gámiz	(Belarus) Sviatlana Pirazhenka (France) Jessika Ponchet	6–2, 7–5
Win	16–21	Jan 2019	ITF Manacor, Spain	W15	Clay	(Spain) Rebeka Masarova	(Germany) Irina Cantos Siemers (Spain) Júlia Payola	6–4, 6–3
Loss	16–22	Jun 2019	Internacional de Barcelona, Spain	W60	Clay	(Spain) Marina Bassols Ribera	(Japan) Kyōka Okamura (Japan) Moyuka Uchijima	6–7^{(7)}, 4–6
Loss	16–23	Dec 2019	ITF Monastir, Tunisia	W15	Hard	(Serbia) Bojana Marinković	(Croatia) Mariana Dražić (Norway) Malene Helgø	6–7^{(4)}, 1–6
Win	17–23	Dec 2019	ITF Monastir, Tunisia	W15	Clay	(Serbia) Bojana Marinković	(Venezuela) Nadia Echeverría Alam (Italy) Aurora Zantedeschi	5–7, 6–2, [11–9]
Win	18–23	Feb 2020	ITF Palmanova, Spain	W15	Clay	(Spain) Ángela Fita Boluda	(Spain) Celia Cerviño Ruiz (Spain) María Gutiérrez Carrasco	6–2, 7–6^{(5)}
Loss	18–24	Mar 2020	ITF Monastir, Tunisia	W15	Hard	(Serbia) Bojana Marinković	(Germany) Sina Herrmann (Romania) Andreea Prisăcariu	6–1, 3–6, [4–10]
Win	19–24	Sep 2020	ITF Melilla, Spain	W15	Clay	(Spain) Ángela Fita Boluda	(Czech Republic) Anna Sisková (Sweden) Caijsa Hennemann	7–6^{(1)}, 6–4
Win	20–24	Oct 2020	ITF Monastir, Tunisia	W15	Hard	(Belgium) Eliessa Vanlangendonck	(Brazil) Rebeca Pereira (Chile) Bárbara Gatica	6–4, 7–6^{(4)}
Win	21–24	Nov 2020	ITF Monastir, Tunisia	W15	Hard	(Serbia) Bojana Marinković	(Bosnia and Herzegovina) Nefisa Berberović (Bosnia and Herzegovina) Anita Husarić	6–1, 6–4
Loss	21–25	Dec 2020	ITF Monastir, Tunisia	W15	Hard	(Spain) Celia Cerviño Ruiz	(Poland) Weronika Falkowska (Belarus) Yuliya Hatouka	4–6, 5–7
Loss	21–26	Jun 2021	ITF Madrid, Spain	W25	Hard	(Spain) Celia Cerviño Ruiz	(United States) Ashley Lahey (Australia) Olivia Tjandramulia	2–6, 6–4, [8–10]
Win	22–26	Sep 2021	ITF Marbella, Spain	W25	Clay	(Spain) Ángela Fita Boluda	(Canada) Bianca Fernandez (Spain) Ana Lantigua de la Nuez	6–3, 6–2
Win	23–26	Oct 2021	ITF Lisbon, Portugal	W25	Clay	(Spain) Ángela Fita Boluda	(Argentina) Paula Ormaechea (Serbia) Natalija Stevanović	3–6, 6–3, [10–4]
Loss	23–27	May 2022	ITF Tossa de Mar, Spain	W25	Carpet	(Spain) Celia Cerviño Ruiz	(Spain) Marina Bassols Ribera (Romania) Ioana Loredana Roșca	5–7, 0–6
Win	24–27	Jun 2022	ITF Madrid, Spain	W25	Hard	(Spain) Guiomar Maristany	(Sweden) Jacqueline Cabaj Awad (Russia) Valeria Savinykh	6–4, 6–4
Loss	24–28	Aug 2022	ITF Ourense, Spain	W25	Hard	(Spain) Lucía Cortez Llorca	(United States) Maria Mateas (Netherlands) Arantxa Rus	4–6, 7–5, [7–10]
Loss	24–29	Mar 2023	ITF Manacor, Spain	W15	Hard	(Spain) Marta González Encinas	(Germany) Joëlle Steur (Belgium) Hanne Vandewinkel	6–7^{(4)}, 2–6
Loss	24–30	Apr 2023	ITF Monastir, Tunisia	W15	Hard	(India) Teja Tirunelveli	(Switzerland) Naïma Karamoko (France) Nina Radovanovic	5–7, 4–6
Loss	24–31	Apr 2023	ITF Monastir, Tunisia	W15	Hard	(India) Teja Tirunelveli	(France) Astrid Cirotte (China) Wang Jiaqi	w/o
Win	25–31	Sep 2023	ITF Ceuta, Spain	W25	Hard	(Spain) Ángela Fita Boluda	(Serbia) Katarina Kozarov (United States) Madison Sieg	7–6^{(0)}, 6–3
Loss	25–32	Sep 2023	ITF Santa Margherita di Pula, Italy	W25	Clay	(Italy) Aurora Zantedeschi	(Georgia (country)) Ekaterine Gorgodze (Germany) Katharina Hobgarski	2–6, 4–6
Win	26–32	Nov 2023	ITF Nules, Spain	W15	Clay	(Spain) Ángela Fita Boluda	(Ukraine) Maryna Kolb (Ukraine) Nadiia Kolb	6–1, 6–2
Loss	26–33	Mar 2024	ITF Sabadell, Spain	W15	Clay	(Sweden) Caijsa Hennemann	(Romania) Oana Georgeta Simion (Germany) Joëlle Steur	6–2, 6–7^{(5)}, [7–10]
Loss	26–34	Mar 2024	ITF Terrassa, Spain	W35	Clay	(India) Vasanti Shinde	(Slovenia) Nika Radišić (Bosnia and Herzegovina) Anita Wagner	5–7, 6–7^{(7)}
Win	27–34	Apr 2024	ITF Santa Margherita di Pula, Italy	W35	Clay	(Italy) Aurora Zantedeschi	(Greece) Sapfo Sakellaridi (India) Vasanti Shinde	3–6, 6–4, [11–9]
Loss	27–35	May 2024	Grado Tennis Cup, Italy	W75	Clay	(Italy) Aurora Zantedeschi	(United States) Jessie Aney (Germany) Lena Papadakis	4–6, 7–5
Win	28–35	Jun 2024	Internazionali di Brescia, Italy	W75	Clay	(Italy) Aurora Zantedeschi	(Kazakhstan) Zhibek Kulambayeva (Russia) Ekaterina Reyngold	3–6, 7–5, [10–6]
Win	29–35	Jul 2024	Roma Cup, Italy	W35	Clay	(Italy) Aurora Zantedeschi	(Switzerland) Leonie Küng (United States) Rasheeda McAdoo	6–4, 6–4
Win	30–35	Aug 2024	Internazionali di Cordenons, Italy	W75	Clay	(Italy) Aurora Zantedeschi	(Italy) Nuria Brancaccio (Spain) Leyre Romero Gormaz	7–5, 2–6, [10–5]
Win	31–35	Aug 2024	Ladies Open Amstetten, Austria	W75	Clay	(Netherlands) Eva Vedder	(Czech Republic) Jesika Malečková (Czech Republic) Miriam Škoch	6–3, 6–2
Loss	31–36	Sep 2024	Lisboa Belém Open, Portugal	W75	Clay	(Spain) Ángela Fita Boluda	(Portugal) Francisca Jorge (Portugal) Matilde Jorge	6–7^{(5)}, 4–6
Win	32–36	Oct 2024	Women's TEC Cup, Spain	W100	Hard	(Netherlands) Eva Vedder	(Algeria) Inès Ibbou (Switzerland) Naïma Karamoko	7–5, 7–6^{(5)}
Loss	32–37	Nov 2025	Kyotec Open, Luxembourg	W75	Hard (i)	(Italy) Angelica Moratelli	(United Kingdom) Emily Appleton (Belgium) Magali Kempen	3–6, 6–3, [6–10]
Loss	32–38	Mar 2026	Trnava Indoor, Slovakia	W75	Hard (i)	(Spain) Aliona Bolsova	(Czech Republic) Anna Sisková (Russia) Anastasia Tikhonova	1–6, 2–6
Loss	32–39	Mar 2026	ITF San Gregorio, Italy	W35	Clay	(Italy) Aurora Zantedeschi	(Czech Republic) Aneta Kučmová (Greece) Sapfo Sakellaridi	2–6, 6–4, [6–10]
Win	33–39	May 2026	Zaragoza Open, Spain	W75	Clay	(Spain) Ángela Fita Boluda	(Belgium) Lara Salden (United States) Ayana Akli	6–4, 6–4
Loss	33–40	Jun 2026	Internazionali di Caserta, Italy	W75	Clay	(Brazil) Laura Pigossi	(United Kingdom) Freya Christie (United Kingdom) Eden Silva	6–3, 4–6, [4–10]
