= Lara Salden =

Belgian tennis player (born 1999)

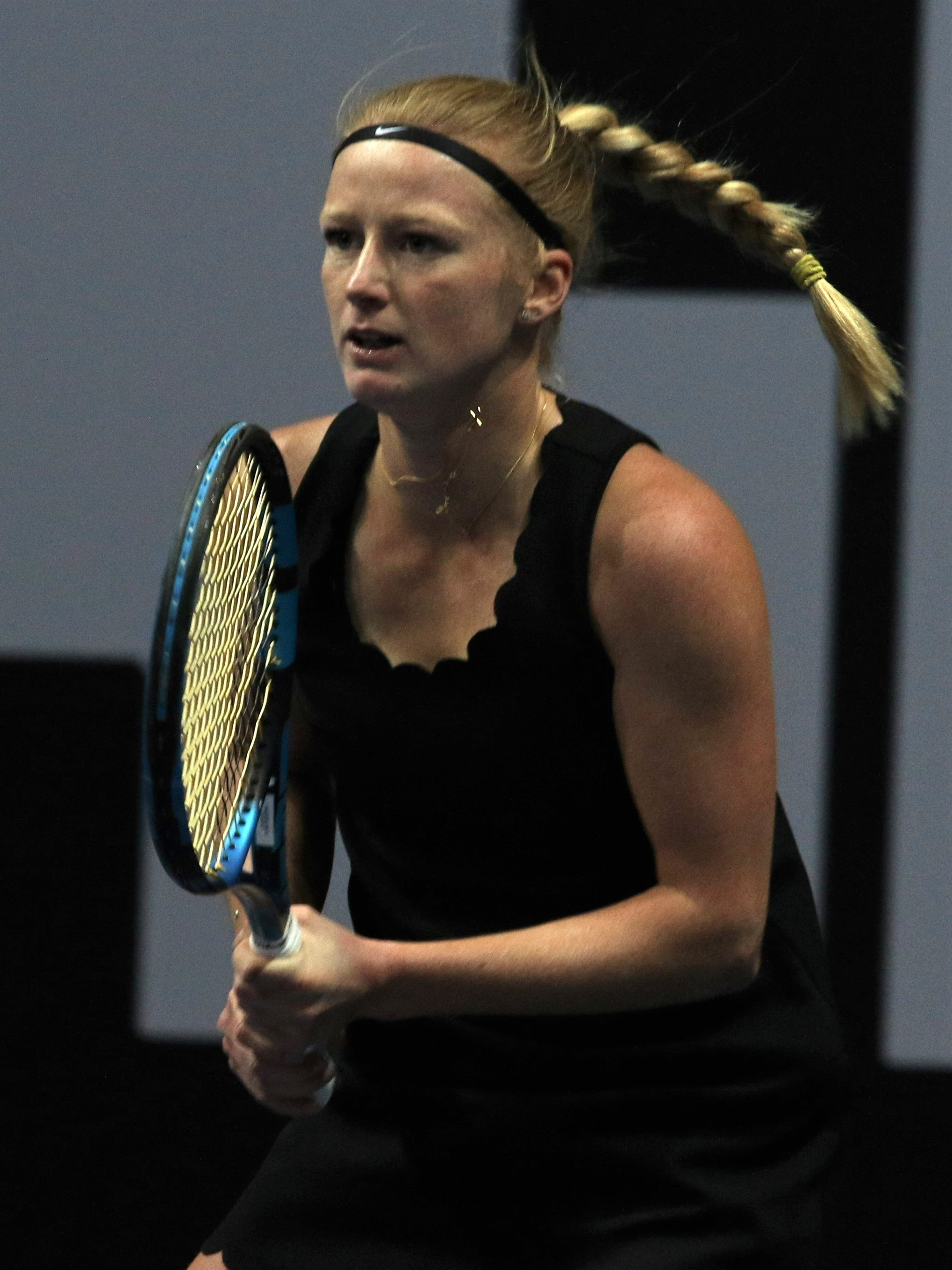
- Salden at the 2021 Open Angers Arena Loire
- Country (sports): Belgium
- Born: 29 January 1999 (age 27)
- Plays: Right (two-handed backhand)
- Prize money: $200,313

Singles
- Career record: 199–144
- Career titles: 6 ITF
- Highest ranking: No. 246 (16 November 2020)

Grand Slam singles results
- Australian Open: Q1 (2021)

Doubles
- Career record: 180–85
- Career titles: 1 WTA 125
- Highest ranking: No. 108 (21 September 2026)
- Current ranking: No. 108 (28 September 2026)
- Last updated on: 28 September 2026.

Lara Salden (born 29 January 1999) is a Belgian tennis player.

She has a career-high doubles ranking of 108 by the WTA, achieved on 21 September 2026. She also has a best WTA singles ranking of 246, reached on 16 November 2020.

Salden retired from tennis in August 2022 but returned competing on the pro tour in 2023.

== Career ==
Salden won her first bigger title on the ITF Women's Circuit in doubles at the 2021 Wiesbaden Open, partnering Anna Bondár.

She reached her first WTA Tour final in doubles, partnering compatriot Magali Kempen, at the 2024 Mérida Open, losing to Quinn Gleason and Ingrid Martins.

Teaming up with Yvonne Cavallé Reimers, she won her first WTA 125 doubles title at the 2026 Memorial Eugenio Fontana, defeating Ekaterine Gorgodze and Naïma Karamoko in the final.

== WTA Tour finals ==
=== Doubles: 1 (runner-up) ===
Legend WTA 250 (0–1)	Finals by surface Hard (0–1)	Finals by setting Outdoor (0–1)

Result	W–L	Date	Tournament	Tier	Surface	Partner	Opponents	Score
Loss	0–1	Oct 2024	Mérida Open, Mexico	WTA 250	Hard	(Belgium) Magali Kempen	(United States) Quinn Gleason (Brazil) Ingrid Martins	4–6, 4–6

== WTA 125 finals ==
=== Doubles: 4 (1 title, 3 runner-ups) ===
Result	W–L	Date	Tournament	Surface	Partner	Opponents	Score
Loss	0-1	Apr 2026	Oeiras CETO Open, Portugal	Clay	(Belgium) Magali Kempen	(Belgium) Sofia Costoulas (Portugal) Matilde Jorge	4–6, 2–6
Win	1–1	Jun 2026	Memorial Eugenio Fontana, Italy	Clay	(Spain) Yvonne Cavallé Reimers	(Georgia (country)) Ekaterine Gorgodze (Switzerland) Naïma Karamoko	6–3, 6–4
Loss	1–2	Jul 2026	Târgu Mureș Open, Romania	Clay	(Spain) Yvonne Cavallé Reimers	(Croatia) Lucija Ćirić Bagarić (Italy) Angelica Moratelli	3–6, 6–1, [9–11]
Loss	1–3	Sep 2026	Adana Open, Turkey	Hard	(Slovenia) Dalila Jakupović	(Italy) Angelica Moratelli (Czech Republic) Vendula Valdmannová	6–7^{(3–7)}, 4–6

== ITF Circuit finals ==
=== Singles: 12 (6 titles, 6 runner-ups) ===
Legend W50 tournaments W25 tournaments W15 tournaments	Finals by surface Hard (2–2) Clay (3–4) Carpet (1–0)

Result	W–L	Date	Tournament	Tier	Surface	Opponent	Score
Win	1–0	Jul 2018	ITF Knokke, Belgium	W15	Clay	(Belarus) Anna Kubareva	6–2, 7–5
Win	2–0	Aug 2018	ITF Wanfercée-Baulet, Belgium	W15	Clay	(France) Lucie Wargnier	6–0, 6–3
Loss	2–1	Sep 2018	ITF Haren, Netherlands	W15	Clay	(Spain) Marina Bassols Ribera	2–6, 6–7^{(4)}
Win	3–1	Dec 2018	ITF Milovice, Czech Republic	W15	Hard	(Bosnia and Herzegovina) Nefisa Berberović	4–6, 6–4, 7–5
Win	4–1	Dec 2018	ITF Jablonec nad Nisou, Czech Republic	W15	Carpet (i)	(Czech Republic) Magdaléna Pantůčková	6–3, 3–6, 6–4
Loss	4–2	Mar 2019	Kōfu International, Japan	W25	Hard	(Italy) Giulia Gatto-Monticone	2–6, 1–6
Loss	4–3	Sep 2019	ITF Clermont-Ferrand, France	W25	Hard	(Poland) Urszula Radwańska	7–6^{(2)}, 3–6, 1–6
Loss	4–4	Sep 2020	Grado Tennis Cup, Italy	W25	Clay	(Germany) Sina Herrmann	4–6, 5–7
Win	5–4	Nov 2020	ITF Lousada, Portugal	W15	Hard (i)	(Switzerland) Susan Bandecchi	6–4, 6–3
Win	6–4	Mar 2022	ITF Gonesse, France	W15	Clay (i)	(Denmark) Sofia Samavati	6–2, 7–6^{(6)}
Loss	6–5	May 2023	ITF Pörtschach, Austria	W15	Clay	(Germany) Carolina Kuhl	1–6, 6–1, 4–6
Loss	6–6	May 2023	ITF Feld am See, Austria	W25	Clay	(Belgium) Sofia Costoulas	3–6, 1–6

=== Doubles: 33 (23 titles, 10 runner-ups) ===
Legend W80 tournaments W75 tournaments W40/50 tournaments W25/35 tournaments W15 tournaments	Finals by surface Hard (11–4) Clay (12–6)

Result	W–L	Date	Tournament	Tier	Surface	Partner	Opponents	Score
Win	1–0	Aug 2017	ITF Wanfercée-Baulet, Belgium	W15	Clay	(Belgium) Chelsea Vanhoutte	(Spain) Helena Jansen Figueras (Portugal) Francisca Jorge	6–3, 7–6^{(3)}
Loss	1–1	Sep 2017	ITF Hammamet, Tunisia	W15	Clay	(Belgium) Chelsea Vanhoutte	(Argentina) Victoria Bosio (Colombia) María Herazo González	4–6, 3–6
Loss	1–2	Mar 2018	ITF Amiens, France	W15	Clay (i)	(France) Camille Sireix	(France) Julie Belgraver (Netherlands) Isabelle Haverlag	6–7^{(4)}, 2–6
Win	2–2	Mar 2018	ITF Gonesse, France	W15	Clay	(France) Camille Sireix	(Netherlands) Suzan Lamens (Belgium) Luna Meers	7–6^{(5)}, 2–6, [11–9]
Win	3–2	Mar 2018	ITF Le Havre, France	W15	Clay (i)	(France) Camille Sireix	(Germany) Tayisiya Morderger (Germany) Yana Morderger	2–6, 6–2, [10–7]
Loss	3–3	Jun 2018	ITF Antalya, Turkey	W15	Clay	(Belgium) Margaux Bovy	(Russia) Yulia Kulikova (Russia) Anna Ureke	4–6, 7–5, [6–10]
Loss	3–4	Jul 2018	ITF Brussels, Belgium	W15	Clay	(France) Camille Sireix	(Germany) Linda Puppendahl (Germany) Sabrina Rittberger	2–6, 2–6
Win	4–4	Aug 2018	ITF Wanfercée-Baulet, Belgium	W15	Clay	(France) Camille Sireix	(Belgium) Michaela Boev (Belgium) Catherine Chantraine	6–2, 6–3
Win	5–4	Dec 2018	ITF Milovice, Czech Republic	W15	Hard (i)	(Russia) Daria Kruzhkova	(Czech Republic) Dagmar Dudlaková (Poland) Joanna Zawadzka	6–0, 6–2
Loss	5–5	Jul 2019	ITF Baja, Hungary	W25	Clay	(Hungary) Réka Luca Jani	(Austria) Melanie Klaffner (Egypt) Mayar Sherif	2–6, 6–4, [8–10]
Win	6–5	Aug 2019	ITF Koksijde, Belgium	W25	Clay	(Belgium) Kimberley Zimmermann	(Netherlands) Suzan Lamens (Russia) Anna Pribylova	6–1, 6–7^{(3)}, [11–9]
Win	7–5	Sep 2019	ITF Clermont-Ferrand, France	W25	Hard (i)	(Norway) Ulrikke Eikeri	(France) Lou Brouleau (Romania) Ioana Loredana Roșca	6–1, 6–4
Loss	7–6	Feb 2020	GB Pro-Series Glasgow, United Kingdom	W25	Hard	(Denmark) Clara Tauson	(France) Myrtille Georges (Belgium) Kimberley Zimmermann	6–7^{(2)}, 6–7^{(5)}
Win	8–6	Nov 2020	ITF Lousada, Portugal	W15	Hard (i)	(Switzerland) Susan Bandecchi	(Italy) Claudia Giovine (Italy) Angelica Moratelli	6–4, 6–3
Win	9–6	Nov 2020	ITF Las Palmas, Spain	W25	Clay	(Belgium) Kimberley Zimmermann	(Netherlands) Suzan Lamens (Netherlands) Eva Vedder	6–1, 6–3
Win	10–6	Mar 2021	ITF Manacor, Spain	W25	Hard	(Hungary) Réka Luca Jani	(Hungary) Anna Bondár (Slovakia) Tereza Mihalíková	6–4, 7–5
Win	11–6	Sep 2021	Wiesbaden Open, Germany	W80	Clay	(Hungary) Anna Bondár	(Netherlands) Arianne Hartono (Australia) Olivia Tjandramulia	6–7^{(9)}, 6–2, [10–4]
Win	12–6	Aug 2022	ITF Koksijde, Belgium	W25	Clay	(Belgium) Magali Kempen	(Belgium) Amelie Van Impe (Belgium) Hanne Vandewinkel	6–2, 6–2
Win	13–6	Jun 2023	ITF Troisdorf, Germany	W25	Clay	(Belgium) Sofia Costoulas	(Belgium) Tilwith Di Girolami (United States) Chiara Scholl	7–6^{(4)}, 6–4
Loss	13–7	Oct 2023	ITF Cherbourg-en-Cotentin, France	W25+H	Hard (i)	(France) Yasmine Mansouri	(Poland) Martyna Kubka (Kazakhstan) Zhibek Kulambayeva	0–6, 3–6
Win	14–7	Nov 2023	ITF Heraklion, Greece	W40	Clay	(Latvia) Daniela Vismane	(Romania) Oana Gavrilă (Greece) Sapfo Sakellaridi	6–4, 6–3
Win	15–7	Dec 2023	ITF Monastir, Tunisia	W25	Hard	(Belgium) Magali Kempen	(Germany) Katharina Hobgarski (Greece) Sapfo Sakellaridi	6–7^{(5)}, 6–4, [10–4]
Win	16–7	Jan 2024	ITF Monastir, Tunisia	W35	Hard	(Belgium) Ema Kovacevic	(Romania) Oana Gavrilă (France) Yasmine Mansouri	3–6, 6–1, [10–8]
Win	17–7	Feb 2024	ITF Edgbaston, United Kingdom	W50	Hard (i)	(Belgium) Magali Kempen	(United Kingdom) Ali Collins (United Kingdom) Lily Miyazaki	7–6^{(6)}, 6–2
Win	18–7	Jun 2024	ITF La Marsa, Tunisia	W35	Hard	(Belgium) Magali Kempen	(Slovakia) Katarína Kužmová (Slovakia) Radka Zelníčková	6–4, 7–6^{(5)}
Win	19–7	Jun 2024	ITF Palma del Río, Spain	W50	Hard	(Poland) Martyna Kubka	(India) Rutuja Bhosale (United States) Sophie Chang	6–2, 6–1
Win	20–7	Aug 2024	ITF Koksijde, Belgium	W35	Clay	(Belgium) Magali Kempen	(Germany) Laura Böhner (Japan) Funa Kozaki	6–4, 6–0
Win	21–7	Aug 2024	ITF Ourense, Spain	W50	Hard	(Poland) Martyna Kubka	(Portugal) Matilde Jorge (United States) Anna Rogers	3–6, 6–3, [10–8]
Win	22–7	Aug 2024	ITF Meerbusch, Germany	W50	Clay	(Belgium) Magali Kempen	(Germany) Gina Marie Dittmann (Germany) Vivien Sandberg	6–3, 6–0
Loss	22–8	Oct 2024	ITF Quinta do Lago, Portugal	W50	Hard	(Belgium) Magali Kempen	(Portugal) Matilde Jorge (Lithuania) Justina Mikulskytė	6–2, 4–6, [12–14]
Loss	22–9	Oct 2024	Challenger de Saguenay, Canada	W75+H	Hard (i)	(Belgium) Magali Kempen	(United States) Dalayna Hewitt (United States) Anna Rogers	1–6, 5–7
Win	23–9	Feb 2026	Open Andrézieux-Bouthéon 42, France	W75	Hard (i)	(France) Julie Belgraver	(Chinese Taipei) Li Yu-yun (China) Li Zongyu	6–4, 3–6, [10–5]
Loss	23–10	May 2026	Zaragoza Open, Spain	W75	Clay	(United States) Ayana Akli	(Spain) Yvonne Cavallé Reimers (Spain) Ángela Fita Boluda	4–6, 4–6
