= Bellinzona Ladies Open =

- 2024 Bellinzona Ladies Open

ITF Women's Tour
- Event name: Bellinzona Ladies Open
- Location: Bellinzona, Switzerland
- Venue: Tennis Club Bellinzona
- Category: ITF Women's World Tennis Tour
- Surface: Clay / outdoor
- Draw: 32S/32Q/16D
- Prize money: $60,000
- Website: www.bellinzonaladiesopen.com

The Bellinzona Ladies Open is a tournament for professional female tennis players played on outdoor clay courts. The event is classified as a $60,000 ITF Women's World Tennis Tour tournament and has been held in Bellinzona, Switzerland, since 2021.

== Past finals ==
=== Singles ===
Year	Champion	Runner-up	Score
2025	(Argentina) Solana Sierra	(Italy) Silvia Ambrosio	6–4, 6–0
2024	(France) Loïs Boisson	(Hungary) Anna Bondár	6–3, 2–6, 6–4
2023	Mirra Andreeva	(France) Fiona Ferro	2–6, 6–1, 6–4
2022	(Cyprus) Raluca Șerban	(Georgia (country)) Ekaterine Gorgodze	6–3, 6–0
2021	(Austria) Julia Grabher	(Italy) Lucia Bronzetti	6–2, 6–3

=== Doubles ===
Year	Champions	Runners-up	Score
2025	(Czech Republic) Aneta Kučmová (Greece) Sapfo Sakellaridi	(Switzerland) Jenny Dürst (United States) Elizabeth Mandlik	7–6^{(7–3)}, 3–6, [10–2]
2024	(Czech Republic) Jesika Malečková (Switzerland) Conny Perrin	(United States) Carmen Corley (United States) Ivana Corley	6–7^{(4–7)}, 7–6^{(9–7)}, [10–7]
2023	(Switzerland) Conny Perrin (Czech Republic) Anna Sisková	(United Kingdom) Freya Christie (United Kingdom) Ali Collins	3–6, 7–6^{(11–9)}, [10–5]
2022	(United Kingdom) Alicia Barnett (United Kingdom) Olivia Nicholls	(Switzerland) Xenia Knoll; Oksana Selekhmeteva	6–7^{(7–9)}, 6–4, [10–7]
2021	(Kazakhstan) Anna Danilina (Georgia (country)) Ekaterine Gorgodze	(Canada) Rebecca Marino (Japan) Yuki Naito	7–5, 6–3
