= Lucia Bronzetti =

Italian tennis player (born 1998)

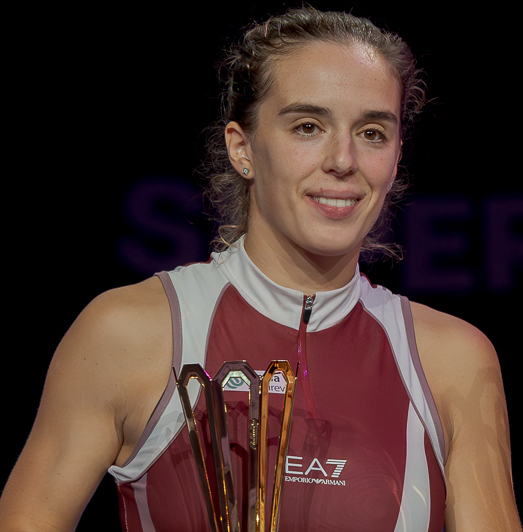
- Bronzetti at the 2025 Transylvania Open singles final ceremony
- Country (sports): Italy
- Residence: Anzio, Italy
- Born: 10 December 1998 (age 27) Rimini, Italy
- Height: 1.70 m (5 ft 7 in)
- Plays: Right-handed (two-handed backhand)
- Prize money: US$ 3,547,750

Singles
- Career record: 363–290
- Career titles: 1
- Highest ranking: No. 46 (8 April 2024)
- Current ranking: No. 132 (26 October 2026)

Grand Slam singles results
- Australian Open: 2R (2022, 2025)
- French Open: 1R (2022, 2023, 2024, 2025, 2026)
- Wimbledon: 2R (2025)
- US Open: 3R (2023)

Other tournaments
- Olympic Games: 1R (2024)

Doubles
- Career record: 46–98
- Career titles: 2 ITF
- Highest ranking: No. 170 (21 July 2025)
- Current ranking: No. 1,719 (26 October 2026)

Grand Slam doubles results
- Australian Open: 2R (2025)
- French Open: 3R (2025)
- Wimbledon: 1R (2022, 2023, 2024, 2025)
- US Open: 1R (2022, 2023, 2024, 2025)

Other doubles tournaments
- Olympic Games: 1R (2024)

Team competitions
- BJK Cup: W (2024, 2025)
- Hopman Cup: F (2025)
- Last updated on: 26 October 2026.

Lucia Bronzetti (born 10 December 1998) is an Italian professional tennis player. She has career-high WTA rankings of No. 46 in singles, achieved on 8 April 2024, and No. 170 in doubles. She has played three finals and won one singles title on the WTA Tour, at the 2023 Morocco Open, and has also reached nine singles finals on the ITF Women's Circuit, of which she won five. Bronzetti was a member of the Italian squad which reaching three finals in a row and won the 2024 and the 2025 Billie Jean King Cup.

In 2023, as the Italian female number two player, she took part in the first edition of the United Cup, reaching the final but losing to Madison Keys in the singles. In 2025, she was also part of the Hopman Cup pairing with Flavio Cobolli, defeating France and Croatia to reach the final with Canada and losing to Bianca Andreescu.

== Early life ==
Bronzetti was born in Rimini and grew up in Verucchio. She began playing tennis at the age of 10 at the suggestion of her aunt, and took lessons at the Tennis Club Valmarecchia in Pietracuta. Her cousin, Alberto Bronzetti, is also a tennis player.

Her training base is in Anzio. She also trains at the Circolo Tennis Viserba, outside of Rimini.

== Career ==
=== 2021: WTA Tour debut and first wins ===
In May, Bronzetti was awarded a wildcard into the singles qualifying rounds of Italian Open, but failed to advance to the main draw. She and playing partner Nuria Brancaccio were awarded a wildcard into the doubles main draw, but lost in the first round to Coco Gauff and Veronika Kudermetova.

She made her WTA Tour singles main draw debut in July after qualifying for the Ladies Open Lausanne, where she reached the quarterfinals with wins over Tess Sugnaux and eighth seed Anna Blinkova. Her run was ended by top seed and eventual champion Tamara Zidanšek. The following week, she reached her second tour quarterfinal at Palermo with wins over fifth seed Viktoriya Tomova and Grace Min, before losing to Elena-Gabriela Ruse.

In August, Bronzetti entered the qualifiers for the US Open, but failed to advance past the first round. The next month, she reached the second round of the Karlsruhe Open. Bronzetti qualified for the Zavarovalnica Sava Portorož and made it to the quarterfinals with wins over seventh seed Rebecca Peterson and Bernarda Pera. She lost in the last eight to second seed Yulia Putintseva.

=== 2022: Major & WTA 1000 debuts, maiden WTA Tour final ===
Bronzetti qualified for her first major at the 2022 Australian Open defeating Amandine Hesse, Valeria Savinykh, and Nao Hibino. She defeated Varvara Gracheva in the first round, before losing to world No. 1 and eventual champion, Ashleigh Barty, in the second.

In March, she made her WTA 1000 main-draw debut as a lucky loser in Miami, reaching the fourth round with wins over Ajla Tomljanović and Stefanie Vögele and a walkover from Anna Kalinskaya, before losing to wildcard player Daria Saville. Following the tournament, she entered the top 100.

Bronzetti made her main-draw debut as a wildcard at the Italian Open, but lost in the first round to Camila Osorio. She reached her first WTA semifinal at the Morocco Open with wins over eighth seed Anna Kalinskaya, Clara Burel, and third seed Nuria Párrizas Díaz, before losing to compatriot and eventual champion Martina Trevisan. She entered the main draws of both the French Open and Wimbledon, but failed to progress past the first round in both, losing to Jelena Ostapenko and Ann Li, respectively.

Bronzetti reached her first WTA Tour final in Palermo with wins over Wang Xiyu, Elina Avanesyan, fifth seed Caroline Garcia, and Jasmine Paolini, before losing to sixth seed Irina-Camelia Begu in the championship match.

Wins over Lily Miyazaki, Priscilla Hon, Victoria Jiménez Kasintseva and fifth seed Rebecca Peterson saw her make it through to the final at the WTA 125 Vancouver Open where she lost to qualifier Valentini Grammatikopoulou.

=== 2023: First WTA Tour title ===
Bronzetti won her first WTA Tour title at the Morocco Open in May, with wins over Rebecca Peterson, eighth seed Tatjana Maria, fourth seed Alycia Parks, and second seed Sloane Stephens, before defeating Julia Grabher in the final.

The following month, she reached her third final and first on grass at the Bad Homburg Open with wins over Julia Grabher, fourth seed Mayar Sherif and eighth seed Varvara Gracheva and the withdrawal of world No. 1, Iga Świątek, in the semifinal. Bronzetti lost to Kateřina Siniaková in the final but reached a new career-high ranking of No. 47 on 3 July.

In August, Bronzetti reached the third round of the US Open, defeating 12th seed Barbora Krejčíková and Eva Lys, before losing to Zheng Qinwen.

During the remainder of the season, she made three WTA 250 quarterfinals at the Guangzhou Open where she lost to Greet Minnen, the Ningbo Open where it was Linda Fruhvirtová who halted her progress, and the Jasmin Open where Jasmine Paolini defeated her.

=== 2024: BJK Cup champion, WTA 125 title ===
Having come through qualifying, Bronzetti defeated 10th seed Daria Kasatkina in the first round at the Dubai Open in February, before losing her next match to Anastasia Potapova.

The following month at the Indian Wells Open, she recorded wins over Magdalena Fręch and 32nd seed Anhelina Kalinina to reach the third round where she lost to third seed Coco Gauff.

Seeded fourth, Bronzetti failed to defend her Morocco Open title in May, going out in the quarterfinals to eventual champion Peyton Stearns, losing seven games in a row from 5–0 ahead in the deciding set.

In July, Bronzetti won the clay-court WTA 125 Contrexéville Open in France, defeating Mayar Sherif in a final which lasted more than three-and-a-half hours.

Later that month, she represented Italy at the Paris Olympics but suffered first round defeats in both the singles and women's doubles.

At the US Open in August, Bronzetti defeated Lulu Sun to reach the second round where she lost to second seed Aryna Sabalenka.

Seeded seventh, Bronzetti made it through to the semifinals at the Jasmin Open in Monastir in September, with wins over Dalma Gálfi, Ann Li and qualifier Antonia Ružić, before losing to Rebecca Šramková in the last four.

In October, having lost in the final qualifying round, she gained entry to the Wuhan Open as a lucky loser, going on to defeat Ajla Tomljanović to reach round two, where she lost to Wang Xinyu in three sets. The following week, Bronzetti defeated Cristina Bucșa in the first round at the Japan Open, before losing to qualifier and eventual champion Suzan Lamens. She continued her good Asian swing form by reaching the semifinals at the Guangzhou Open with straight sets wins over fourth seed Elina Avanesyan, Jaqueline Cristian and Wang Xiyu. Bronzetti lost in the last four to qualifier Caroline Dolehide in a deciding set tie-break.

At the BJK Cup finals, Bronzetti defeated Magda Linette as Italy overcame Poland 2–1 in the semifinals. She then overcame Viktória Hrunčáková in the opening singles match of the final as Italy claimed the title with a win over Slovakia.

=== 2025: Cluj-Napoca final, second WTA 1000 fourth round ===
In February, Bronzetti overcame wildcard entrant Simona Halep, third seed Peyton Stearns, seventh seed Elisabetta Cocciaretto and fifth seed Kateřina Siniaková to reach the final at the Transylvania Open in Cluj-Napoca, which she lost to top seed Anastasia Potapova. As a result, she jumped 16 places in the WTA rankings to world No. 56 on 10 February 2025.

The following month at the WTA 1000 event in Indian Wells, she defeated Anhelina Kalinina and 30th seed Magdalena Fręch to make it through to the third round, at which point she lost to world No. 1, Aryna Sabalenka.

At Wimbledon, Bronzetti overcame Jil Teichmann for her first win at the grass-court major, before losing to seventh seed Mirra Andreeva in the second round.

In August at the Cincinnati Open, wins over Zhu Lin, 15th seed Daria Kasatkina and 23rd seed Jeļena Ostapenko saw Bronzetti reach the fourth round of a WTA 1000 event for just the second time. She lost to second seed Coco Gauff in straight sets.

=== 2026: Two WTA 125 finals ===
In June, Bronzetti reached the final at the WTA 125 Memorial Eugenio Fontana, losing to Katarzyna Kawa in a third set tiebreak. The following month, she was runner-up at the WTA 125 ATV Rome Open, suffering a straight sets defeat to third seed Francesca Jones in the final.

== Performance timeline ==
Key
| W | F | SF | QF | #R | RR | Q# | P# | DNQ | A | Z# | PO | G | S | B | NMS | NTI | P | NH |

(W) winner; (F) finalist; (SF) semifinalist; (QF) quarterfinalist; (#R) rounds 4, 3, 2, 1; (RR) round-robin stage; (Q#) qualification round; (P#) preliminary round; (DNQ) did not qualify; (A) absent; (Z#) Davis/Fed Cup Zonal Group (with number indication) or (PO) play-off; (G) gold, (S) silver or (B) bronze Olympic/Paralympic medal; (NMS) not a Masters tournament; (NTI) not a Tier I tournament; (P) postponed; (NH) not held; (SR) strike rate (events won / competed); (W–L) win–loss record.
To avoid confusion and double counting, these charts are updated at the conclusion of a tournament or when the player's participation has ended.

Only main-draw results in WTA Tour, Grand Slam tournaments, Billie Jean King Cup, United Cup, Hopman Cup and Olympic Games are included in win–loss records.

=== Singles ===
Current through the 2026 French Open.

| Tournament | 2021 | 2022 | 2023 | 2024 | 2025 | 2026 | SR | W–L | Win% |
|---|---|---|---|---|---|---|---|---|---|
Grand Slam tournaments
| Australian Open | A | 2R | 1R | 1R | 2R | Q3 | 0 / 4 | 2–4 | 33% |
| French Open | A | 1R | 1R | 1R | 1R | 1R | 0 / 5 | 0–5 | 0% |
| Wimbledon | A | 1R | 1R | 1R | 2R | Q3 | 0 / 4 | 1–4 | 20% |
| US Open | Q1 | 1R | 3R | 2R | 1R | Q2 | 0 / 4 | 3–4 | 43% |
| Win–loss | 0–0 | 1–4 | 2–4 | 1–4 | 2–4 | 0–1 | 0 / 17 | 6–17 | 26% |
National representation
| Billie Jean King Cup | A | A | F (Note: Bronzetti was part of the team, but only played in the doubles) | W | W | | 1 / 2 | 2–0 | 100% |
WTA 1000
| Qatar Open | A | A | A | Q1 | A | A | 0 / 0 | 0–0 | – |
| Dubai Championships | A | A | A | 2R | Q1 | A | 0 / 1 | 1–1 | 50% |
| Indian Wells Open | A | Q2 | 1R | 3R | 3R | A | 0 / 3 | 4–3 | 57% |
| Miami Open | A | 4R | 1R | 1R | 2R | A | 0 / 4 | 3–4 | 43% |
| Madrid Open | A | Q2 | 1R | 2R | 2R | A | 0 / 3 | 2–3 | 40% |
| Italian Open | Q1 | 1R | 1R | 1R | 2R | 1R | 0 / 5 | 1–5 | 20% |
| Canadian Open | A | A | 1R | A | 2R | A | 0 / 2 | 1–2 | 33% |
| Cincinnati Open | A | A | Q1 | 1R | 4R | A | 0 / 2 | 3–2 | 60% |
| Guadalajara Open | NH | A | A | NMS | | | 0 / 0 | 0–0 | – |
| China Open | NH | | Q2 | 1R | 1R | A | 0 / 2 | 0–2 | 0% |
| Wuhan Open | NH | | | 2R | 1R | A | 0 / 2 | 1–2 | 33% |
| Win–loss | 0–0 | 2–2 | 0–5 | 5–8 | 9–8 | 0–1 | 0 / 24 | 16–24 | 40% |
Career statistics
| | 2021 | 2022 | 2023 | 2024 | 2025 | 2026 | SR | W–L | Win% |
| Tournaments | 4 | 15 | 21 | 27 | 10 | 4 | Career total: 79 | | |
| Titles | 0 | 0 | 1 | 0 | 0 | 0 | Career total: 1 | | |
| Finals | 0 | 1 | 2 | 0 | 1 | 0 | Career total: 4 | | |
| Hard win–loss | 2–2 | 4–7 | 12–15 | 16–18 | 12–15 | 0–1 | 0 / 58 | 46–58 | 44% |
| Clay win–loss | 4–2 | 7–6 | 5–5 | 4–7 | 2–6 | 0–3 | 1 / 30 | 22–29 | 43% |
| Grass win–loss | 0–0 | 1–2 | 3–2 | 1–3 | 1–3 | 0–0 | 0 / 10 | 6–10 | 38% |
| Overall win–loss | 6–4 | 12–15 | 20–22 | 21–28 | 15–24 | 0–4 | 1 / 98 | 74–97 | 43% |
| Year-end ranking (Note: 2015: WTA ranking–1229, 2016: WTA ranking–718, 2017: WTA ranking–688, 2018: WTA ranking–489, 2019: WTA ranking–356, 2020: WTA ranking–339.) | 145 | 56 | 64 | 78 | 103 | | $3,270,232 | | |

== WTA Tour finals ==
=== Singles: 4 (1 title, 3 runner-ups) ===
| Legend WTA 1000 WTA 500 WTA 250 (1–3) | Finals by surface Hard (0–1) Grass (0–1) Clay (1–1) |

| Result | W–L | Date | Tournament | Tier | Surface | Opponent | Score |
|---|---|---|---|---|---|---|---|
| Loss | 0–1 | Jul 2022 | Palermo Ladies Open, Italy | WTA 250 | Clay | (Romania) Irina-Camelia Begu | 2–6, 2–6 |
| Win | 1–1 | May 2023 | Rabat Grand Prix, Morocco | WTA 250 | Clay | (Austria) Julia Grabher | 6–4, 5–7, 7–5 |
| Loss | 1–2 | Jul 2023 | Bad Homburg Open, Germany | WTA 250 | Grass | (Czech Republic) Kateřina Siniaková | 2–6, 6–7^{(5–7)} |
| Loss | 1–3 | Feb 2025 | Transylvania Open, Romania | WTA 250 | Hard (i) | Anastasia Potapova | 6–4, 1–6, 2–6 |

== WTA Challenger finals ==
=== Singles: 4 (1 title, 3 runner-ups) ===
| Result | W–L | Date | Tournament | Surface | Opponent | Score |
|---|---|---|---|---|---|---|
| Loss | 0–1 | Aug 2022 | Vancouver Open, Canada | Hard | (Greece) Valentini Grammatikopoulou | 2–6, 4–6 |
| Win | 1–1 | Jul 2024 | Contrexéville Open, France | Clay | (Egypt) Mayar Sherif | 6–4, 6–7^{(4–7)}, 7–5 |
| Loss | 1–2 | Jun 2026 | Memorial Eugenio Fontana, Italy | Clay | (Poland) Katarzyna Kawa | 1–6, 6–4, 6–7^{(6–8)} |
| Loss | 1–3 | Jul 2026 | ATV Rome Open, Italy | Clay | (United Kingdom) Francesca Jones | 3–6, 1–6 |

== Team competition finals ==
| Result | Date | Tournament | Surface | Team | Partner(s) | Opponent team | Opponent players | Score |
|---|---|---|---|---|---|---|---|---|
| Loss | Jul 2025 | Hopman Cup | Hard | Italy | Flavio Cobolli | Canada | Félix Auger-Aliassime; Bianca Andreescu | 1–2 |

== ITF Circuit finals ==
=== Singles: 9 (5 titles, 4 runner-ups) ===
| Legend W60 tournaments (1–2) W25 tournaments (0–2) W10/15 tournaments (4–0) | Finals by surface Hard (2–1) Clay (3–3) |

| Result | W–L | Date | Tournament | Tier | Surface | Opponent | Score |
|---|---|---|---|---|---|---|---|
| Win | 1–0 | Sep 2016 | ITF Sion, Switzerland | 10,000 | Clay | (Switzerland) Karin Kennel | 6–3, 7–6^{(7–5)} |
| Win | 2–0 | Nov 2017 | ITF Sharm El Sheikh, Egypt | 15,000 | Hard | (Germany) Julia Wachaczyk | 6–1, 6–2 |
| Win | 3–0 | Feb 2021 | ITF Sharm El Sheikh | W15 | Hard | (Bosnia and Herzegovina) Nefisa Berberović | 7–6^{(7–4)}, 6–0 |
| Win | 4–0 | Mar 2021 | ITF Le Havre, France | W15 | Clay | (France) Sara Cakarevic | 6–3, 6–1 |
| Loss | 4–1 | Apr 2021 | Bellinzona Ladies Open, Switzerland | W60 | Clay | (Austria) Julia Grabher | 2–6, 3–6 |
| Loss | 4–2 | Jun 2021 | ITF Jönköping, Sweden | W25 | Clay | (Russia) Darya Astakhova | 6–3, 3–6, 5–7 |
| Loss | 4–3 | Jul 2021 | ITF Turin, Italy | W25 | Clay | (France) Diane Parry | 4–6, 2–6 |
| Win | 5–3 | Apr 2022 | Chiasso Open, Switzerland | W60 | Clay | (Switzerland) Simona Waltert | 2–6, 6–3, 6–3 |
| Loss | 5–4 | Apr 2023 | Open de Seine-et-Marne, France | W60 | Hard (i) | (United Kingdom) Jodie Burrage | 6–3, 4–6, 0–6 |

=== Doubles: 4 (2 titles, 2 runner-ups) ===
| Legend W25 tournaments (1–1) W15 tournaments (1–1) | Finals by surface Clay (2–2) |

| Result | W–L | Date | Tournament | Tier | Surface | Partner | Opponents | Score |
|---|---|---|---|---|---|---|---|---|
| Loss | 0–1 | Dec 2017 | Internazionali di Cordenons, Italy | 15,000 | Clay | (Russia) Ludmilla Samsonova | (Italy) Federica di Sarra (Italy) Michele Alexandra Zmău | 2–6, 6–1, [8–10] |
| Win | 1–1 | Nov 2018 | Internazionali di Cordenons, Italy | 15,000 | Clay | (Italy) Anastasia Grymalska | (Italy) Verena Hofer (Italy) Maria Vittoria Viviani | 7–5, 7–5 |
| Win | 2–1 | Jun 2021 | Grado Tennis Cup, Italy | W25 | Clay | (Bulgaria) Isabella Shinikova | (Italy) Federica di Sarra (Italy) Camilla Rosatello | 6–4, 2–6, [10–8] |
| Loss | 2–2 | Jul 2021 | ITF Torino, Italy | W25 | Clay | (Italy) Aurora Zantedeschi | (Italy) Federica di Sarra (Italy) Camilla Rosatello | 2–6, 2–6 |

== Head-to-head record ==
=== Record against top 10 players ===
- She has a 0–5 record against players who were, at the time the match was played, ranked in the top 10.

| Result | W–L | Opponent | Rank | Event | Surface | Round | Score | Rank | H2H |
|---|---|---|---|---|---|---|---|---|---|
2022
| Loss | 0–1 | (Australia) Ashleigh Barty | No. 1 | Australian Open | Hard | 2R | 1–6, 1–6 | No. 142 | |
2023
| Loss | 0–2 | (Tunisia) Ons Jabeur | No. 7 | French Open | Clay | 1R | 4–6, 1–6 | No. 65 | |
2025
| Loss | 0–3 | Aryna Sabalenka | No.1 | BNP Paribas Open | Hard | 3R | 1–6, 2–6 | No. 62 | |
| Loss | 0–4 | Mirra Andreeva | No. 7 | Wimbledon Championships | Grass | 2R | 1–6, 6–7^{(4)} | No. 63 | |
| Loss | 0–5 | (United States) Coco Gauff | No. | Cincinnati Open | Hard | 4R | 2–6, 4–6 | No. 61 | |
