= 2025 Tolentino Open =

Tennis tournament

- Date: 15–21 September 2025
- Edition: 1st
- Category: WTA 125
- Prize money: €100,000
- Surface: Clay
- Location: Tolentino, Italy

Champions

Singles
- (Ukraine) Oleksandra Oliynykova

Doubles
- (Czech Republic) Jesika Malečková / (Czech Republic) Miriam Škoch
Tolentino Open	· 2026 →

The 2025 Lexus Tolentino Open was a professional women's tennis tournament played on outdoor clay courts. It was the first edition of the tournament and part of the 2025 WTA 125 tournaments. It took place in Tolentino, Italy between 15 and 21 September 2025.

== Singles main-draw entrants ==
=== Seeds ===
Country	Player	Rank^{1}	Seed
EGY	Mayar Sherif	103	1
LAT	Darja Semeņistaja	110	2
CZE	Sára Bejlek	113	3
~~SUI~~	~~Simona Waltert~~	~~124~~	~~4~~
AUT	Sinja Kraus	128	5
NED	Arantxa Rus	135	6
CZE	Dominika Šalková	147	7
SLO	Tamara Zidanšek	150	8
SLO	Kaja Juvan	154	9

- ^{1} Rankings are as of 8 September 2025.

=== Other entrants ===
The following players received wildcards into the singles main draw:

- (Italy) Noemi Basiletti
- (Italy) Samira De Stefano
- (Italy) Jennifer Ruggeri
- (Italy) Sofia Rocchetti

The following players received entry from the qualifying draw:

- (Malta) Francesca Curmi
- (Italy) Tatiana Pieri
- (Australia) Tina Smith
- (Italy) Federica Urgesi

The following players received entry as lucky losers:

- (Germany) Noma Noha Akugue
- (Italy) Aurora Zantedeschi

=== Withdrawals ===
- (Canada) Carson Branstine → replaced by (Germany) Noma Noha Akugue
- (Switzerland) Simona Waltert → replaced by (Italy) Aurora Zantedeschi

== Doubles entrants ==
=== Seeds ===
Country	Player	Country	Player	Rank	Seed
CZE	Jesika Malečková	CZE	Miriam Škoch	176	1
GBR	Alicia Barnett	FRA	Elixane Lechemia	249	2
	Amina Anshba	GBR	Eden Silva	305	3
ITA	Angelica Moratelli	ITA	Aurora Zantedeschi	343	4

- Rankings as of 8 September 2025.

== Champions ==
=== Singles ===
- (Ukraine) Oleksandra Oliynykova def. (Italy) Nuria Brancaccio 6–2, 6–0

=== Doubles ===
- (Czech Republic) Jesika Malečková / (Czech Republic) Miriam Škoch def. (Italy) Silvia Ambrosio / (Italy) Nuria Brancaccio, 6–3, 3–6, [10–8]
