= 2026 Generali Open Ladies Kitzbühel =

- Date: 13–19 July
- Edition: 1st
- Category: WTA 125
- Draw: 32S / 8D
- Prize money: $115,000
- Surface: Clay
- Location: Kitzbühel, Austria
- Venue: Tennis Stadium Kitzbühel

Champions

Singles
- (Austria) Sinja Kraus

Doubles
- (United Kingdom) Alicia Barnett / (France) Elixane Lechemia
- Generali Open Ladies

The 2026 Generali Open Ladies Kitzbühel was a professional women's tennis tournament played on outdoor clay courts. It was the 1st edition of the event, which was part of the 2026 WTA 125 tournaments. It took place in Kitzbühel, Austria, from 13 through 19 July 2026. The tournament marked the return of women's tennis to Austria for the first time since 2015, when the last WTA event was held in Bad Gastein.

== Singles main draw entrants ==
=== Seeds ===
Country	Player	Rank^{†}	Seed
SLO	Veronika Erjavec	89	1
AUT	Sinja Kraus	93	2
~~GER~~	~~Tatjana Maria~~	~~96~~	~~3~~
AUT	Julia Grabher	116	4
ESP	Marina Bassols Ribera	144	5
CZE	Laura Samson	147	6
BEL	Jeline Vandromme	161	7
GRE	Despina Papamichail	169	8

^{†} Ranking are as of 6 July 2026.

=== Other entrants ===
The following players received wildcards into the singles main draw :

- (Germany) Eva Bennemann
- (Austria) Arabella Koller
- (Austria) Ekaterina Perelygina
- (Austria) Leonie Rabl

The following players received entry from the qualifying draw :

- (Argentina) Victoria Bosio
- (Italy) Martina Colmegna
- (Poland) Gina Feistel
- (Slovenia) Dalila Jakupović

The following player received entry as a lucky loser:

- (Czech Republic) Barbora Palicová

=== Withdrawals ===
Before the tournament

- (Slovenia) Kaja Juvan → replaced by (Serbia) Mia Ristić
- (Germany) Tatjana Maria → replaced by (Czech Republic) Barbora Palicová
- (Ukraine) Katarina Zavatska → replaced by (Morocco) Yasmine Kabbaj

=== Retirement ===
- (Slovenia) Polona Hercog

== Doubles main draw entrants ==
=== Seeds ===
Country	Player	Country	Player	Rank^{1}	Seed
UKR	Valeriya Strakhova		Anastasia Tikhonova	186	1
ESP	Yvonne Cavallé Reimers	BRA	Laura Pigossi	193	2

- ^{1} Rankings as of 7 July 2026.

=== Other entrants ===
The following pairs received a wildcard into the doubles main draw:

- (Germany) Anna-Lena Friedsam / (Austria) Ekaterina Perelygina

== Finals ==
=== Singles ===
- (Austria) Sinja Kraus def. (Austria) Julia Grabher 6–3, 6–1

=== Doubles ===
- (United Kingdom) Alicia Barnett / (France) Elixane Lechemia def. (Spain) Yvonne Cavallé Reimers / (Brazil) Laura Pigossi 6–4, 6–3
