= 2025 Tolentino Open – Singles =

Singles
- 2025 Tolentino Open

Final
- Champion: (Ukraine) Oleksandra Oliynykova
- Runner-up: (Italy) Nuria Brancaccio
- Score: 6–2, 6–0

Events
Singles	Doubles
Tolentino Open	· 2026 →

Oleksandra Oliynykova won the title, defeating Nuria Brancaccio in the final, 6–2, 6–0.

This was the first edition of the tournament.

== Seeds ==
1. (Egypt) Mayar Sherif (second round)
2. (Latvia) Darja Semeņistaja (second round)
3. (Czech Republic) Sára Bejlek (first round)
4. (Switzerland) Simona Waltert (withdrew)
5. (Austria) Sinja Kraus (second round)
6. (Netherlands) Arantxa Rus (semifinals)
7. (Czech Republic) Dominika Šalková (first round, retired)
8. (Slovenia) Tamara Zidanšek (quarterfinals)
9. (Slovenia) Kaja Juvan (first round)

== Draw ==
=== Key ===
- Q = Qualifier
- WC = Wild card
- LL = Lucky loser
- Alt = Alternate
- ITF = ITF entry
- PR = Protected ranking
- SR = Special ranking
- SE = Special exempt
- JE = Junior exempt
- JR = Junior Accelerator Programme entrant
- CO = College Accelerator Programme entrant
- NG = Next Gen Accelerator Program entrant
- w/o = Walkover
- r = Retired
- d = Defaulted

=== Finals ===
Semifinals
6	(Netherlands) Arantxa Rus	4	4
(Italy) Nuria Brancaccio	6	6
(Italy) Silvia Ambrosio	2	2
(Ukraine) Oleksandra Oliynykova	6	6

Final
(Italy) Nuria Brancaccio	2	0
(Ukraine) Oleksandra Oliynykova	6	6

=== Top half ===
First round
1	(Egypt) M Sherif	6	6
(Switzerland) C Naef	2	1
(Georgia (country)) E Gorgodze	6	4	7^{7}
(Belgium) H Vandewinkel	1	6	6^{4}
Q	(Italy) T Pieri	2	6	4
Q	(Malta) F Curmi	6	3	1^{r}
(Croatia) T Würth	3	4
6	(Netherlands) A Rus	6	6
3	(Czech Republic) S Bejlek	4	6	6^{1}
(Italy) N Brancaccio	6	3	7^{7}
WC	(Italy) S De Stefano	6	3	4
LL	(Italy) A Zantedeschi	1	6	6
(Germany) C Werner	3	1^{r}
(Serbia) L Radivojević	6	3
(Italy) M Trevisan	7	3	6^{2}
5	(Austria) S Kraus	5	6	7^{7}

Second round
1	(Egypt) M Sherif	0	2
(Georgia (country)) E Gorgodze	6	6
Q	(Italy) T Pieri	6	4	5
6	(Netherlands) A Rus	2	6	7
(Italy) N Brancaccio	6	6
LL	(Italy) A Zantedeschi	1	2
(Serbia) L Radivojević	6	6
5	(Austria) S Kraus	3	3

Quarterfinals
(Georgia (country)) E Gorgodze	0	1
6	(Netherlands) A Rus	6	6
(Italy) N Brancaccio	6	6
(Serbia) L Radivojević	2	2

Semifinals
6	(Netherlands) A Rus	4	4
(Italy) N Brancaccio	6	6

=== Bottom half ===
First round
7	(Czech Republic) D Šalková	7	3	0^{r}
(Italy) S Ambrosio	5	6	4
WC	(Italy) S Rocchetti	1	5
(Czech Republic) B Palicová	6	7
WC	(Italy) N Basiletti	3	0
(France) A Ramé	6	6
(Netherlands) A Koevermans	6	6
9	(Slovenia) K Juvan	3	3
8	(Slovenia) T Zidanšek	6	6
WC	(Italy) J Ruggeri	2	2
(Switzerland) Y In-Albon	6	7^{8}
LL	(Germany) N Noha Akugue	4	6^{6}
(Ukraine) O Oliynykova	6	6
Q	(Italy) F Urgesi	1	2
Q	(Australia) T Smith	2	4
2	(Latvia) D Semeņistaja	6	6

Second round
(Italy) S Ambrosio	6	6
(Czech Republic) B Palicová	3	3
(France) A Ramé	7^{7}	0
(Netherlands) A Koevermans	6^{5}	0^{r}
8	(Slovenia) T Zidanšek	6	4	6
(Switzerland) Y In-Albon	2	6	3
(Ukraine) O Oliynykova	6	6
2	(Latvia) D Semeņistaja	2	2

Quarterfinals
(Italy) S Ambrosio	6	6
(France) A Ramé	4	3
8	(Slovenia) T Zidanšek	2	3
(Ukraine) O Oliynykova	6	6

Semifinals
(Italy) S Ambrosio	2	2
(Ukraine) O Oliynykova	6	6

== Qualifying ==
=== Seeds ===
1. (Australia) Tina Smith (qualified)
2. (Italy) Aurora Zantedeschi (qualifying competition, lucky loser)
3. (Malta) Francesca Curmi (qualified)
4. (Turkey) İpek Öz (first round)
5. (Germany) Noma Noha Akugue (qualifying competition, lucky loser)
6. (Italy) Tatiana Pieri (qualified)
7. (Italy) Dalila Spiteri (first round)
8. (Spain) Cristina Díaz Adrover (qualifying competition)

=== Qualifiers ===
1. (Australia) Tina Smith
2. (Italy) Tatiana Pieri
3. (Malta) Francesca Curmi
4. (Italy) Federica Urgesi

=== Lucky losers ===
1. (Germany) Noma Noha Akugue
2. (Italy) Aurora Zantedeschi

=== Qualifying draw ===
==== First qualifier ====
First round				Qualifying competition
				1	(Australia) Tina Smith	6	4	7
				5	(Germany) Noma Noha Akugue	4	6	5
	(Czech Republic) Aneta Kučmová	6^{1}	4	5	(Germany) Noma Noha Akugue	4	6	5
5	(Germany) Noma Noha Akugue	7^{7}	6

==== Second qualifier ====
First round				Qualifying competition
				2	(Italy) Aurora Zantedeschi	2	1
				6	(Italy) Tatiana Pieri	6	6
	(Italy) Beatrice Ricci	2	1	6	(Italy) Tatiana Pieri	6	6
6	(Italy) Tatiana Pieri	6	6

==== Third qualifier ====
First round
3	(Malta) Francesca Curmi	6	6
(Italy) Angelica Raggi	4	3
(Italy) Verena Meliss	4	6	6
7	(Italy) Dalila Spiteri	6	1	4

Qualifying competition
3	(Malta) Francesca Curmi	6	6
(Italy) Verena Meliss	4	2

==== Fourth qualifier ====
First round
4	(Turkey) İpek Öz	3	6	2
(Italy) Federica Urgesi	6	1	6
Amina Anshba	6	2	2
8	(Spain) Cristina Díaz Adrover	2	6	6

Qualifying competition
(Italy) Federica Urgesi	1	6	6
8	(Spain) Cristina Díaz Adrover	6	4	4
