= 2025 Kyotec Open =

Tennis tournament

- Date: 17–23 November 2025
- Edition: 22nd
- Category: ITF Women's World Tennis Tour
- Prize money: $60,000
- Surface: Hard / Indoor
- Location: Pétange, Luxembourg

Champions

Singles
- (Germany) Eva Bennemann

Doubles
- (United Kingdom) Emily Appleton / (Belgium) Magali Kempen
← 2024 ·	ITF Roller Open	· 2026 →

The 2025 Kyotec Open is a professional tennis tournament played on indoor hard courts. It is the twenty-second edition of the tournament which was part of the 2025 ITF Women's World Tennis Tour. It took place in Pétange, Luxembourg between 17 and 23 November 2025.

== Champions ==
=== Singles ===
- (Germany) Eva Bennemann def. (Belgium) Jeline Vandromme, 6–3, 6–2

=== Doubles ===
- (United Kingdom) Emily Appleton / (Belgium) Magali Kempen def. (Spain) Yvonne Cavallé Reimers / (Italy) Angelica Moratelli, 6–3, 3–6, [10–6]

== Singles main draw entrants ==
=== Seeds ===
Country	Player	Rank^{1}	Seed
	Oksana Selekhmeteva	97	1
ROU	Elena-Gabriela Ruse	99	2
ITA	Lucia Bronzetti	103	3
CRO	Petra Marčinko	117	4
BEL	Hanne Vandewinkel	125	5
UZB	Maria Timofeeva	150	6
UKR	Daria Snigur	158	7
SRB	Teodora Kostović	190	8

- ^{1} Rankings are as of 10 November 2025.

=== Other entrants ===
The following players received wildcards into the singles main draw:

- (Belgium) Polina Bakhmutkina
- (France) Océane Dodin
- (Belgium) Jeline Vandromme
- (Luxembourg) Marie Weckerle

The following players received entry from the qualifying draw:

- (Germany) Eva Bennemann
- (Germany) Josy Daems
- (Italy) Samira De Stefano
- (Switzerland) Chelsea Fontenel
- (Netherlands) Jasmijn Gimbrère
- (Germany) Mina Hodzic
- (Spain) María Martínez Vaquero
- Ekaterina Ovcharenko
