= 2026 Tolentino Open – Doubles =

Doubles
- 2026 Tolentino Open

Final
- Champions: (Georgia (country)) Ekaterine Gorgodze (Greece) Despina Papamichail
- Runners-up: (Czech Republic) Aneta Kučmová (Czech Republic) Aneta Laboutková
- Score: 6–1, 6–2

Events
Singles	Doubles
- Tolentino Open

Jesika Malečková and Miriam Škoch were the reigning champions, but did not participate this year.

Ekaterine Gorgodze and Despina Papamichail won the title, defeating Aneta Kučmová and Aneta Laboutková 6–1, 6–2 in the final.

== Seeds ==
1. (Croatia) Lucija Ćirić Bagarić / (Brazil) Laura Pigossi (quarterfinals)
2. (Argentina) Nicole Fossa Huergo / (Spain) Alicia Herrero Liñana (quarterfinals)
3. (Czech Republic) Aneta Kučmová / (Czech Republic) Aneta Laboutková (final)
4. (Sweden) Lisa Zaar / (Italy) Aurora Zantedeschi (first round)

== Draw ==
Key

- Q = Qualifier
- WC = Wild card
- LL = Lucky loser
- Alt = Alternate
- ITF = ITF entry
- PR = Protected ranking
- SR = Special ranking
- SE = Special exempt
- JE = Junior exempt
- JR = Junior Accelerator Programme entrant
- CO = College Accelerator Programme entrant
- NG = Next Gen Accelerator Program entrant
- w/o = Walkover
- r = Retired
- d = Defaulted

=== Draw ===
First round
(Italy) E Chiesa (France) A Tubello	6	6
(United States) K Allen (Mexico) S Leon	3	4
3	(Czech Republic) A Kučmová (Czech Republic) A Laboutková	6	6
(Italy) N Basiletti (Italy) F Urgesi	4	3
(Slovenia) A Senica (Romania) M Toma	4	1
(Germany) T Morderger (Germany) Y Morderger	6	6
(United States) J Snells (United States) B Walker	6	6
WC	(Italy) G De Angelis (Italy) A Ovarelli	1	2
(Italy) A Moratelli (Italy) J Ruggeri	3	7^{9}	[13]
4	(Sweden) L Zaar (Italy) A Zantedeschi	6	6^{7}	[11]
(Italy) S De Stefano (Italy) J Pieri	2	3
(Georgia (country)) E Gorgodze (Greece) D Papamichail	6	6
(Italy) IM Șerban (Czech Republic) J Štruplová	2	4
2	(Argentina) N Fossa Huergo (Spain) A Herrero Liñana	6	6

Quarterfinals
1	(Croatia) L Ćirić Bagarić (Brazil) L Pigossi	3	6	[6]
(Italy) E Chiesa (France) A Tubello	6	2	[10]
3	(Czech Republic) A Kučmová (Czech Republic) A Laboutková	6	6
(Germany) T Morderger (Germany) Y Morderger	1	2
(United States) J Snells (United States) B Walker	3	1
(Italy) A Moratelli (Italy) J Ruggeri	6	6
(Georgia (country)) E Gorgodze (Greece) D Papamichail	4	7^{7}	[10]
2	(Argentina) N Fossa Huergo (Spain) A Herrero Liñana	6	6^{5}	[8]

Semifinals
(Italy) E Chiesa (France) A Tubello	1	2
3	(Czech Republic) A Kučmová (Czech Republic) A Laboutková	6	6
(Italy) A Moratelli (Italy) J Ruggeri	2	6^{5}
(Georgia (country)) E Gorgodze (Greece) D Papamichail	6	7^{7}

Final
3	(Czech Republic) A Kučmová (Czech Republic) A Laboutková	1	2
(Georgia (country)) E Gorgodze (Greece) D Papamichail	6	6
