= 2026 Tolentino Open – Singles =

Singles
- 2026 Tolentino Open

Final
- Champion: (Austria) Julia Grabher
- Runner-up: (Spain) Guiomar Maristany
- Score: 7–6^{(7–5)}, 6–2

Events
Singles	Doubles
- Tolentino Open

Julia Grabher won the title, defeating Guiomar Maristany in the final, 7–6^{(7–5)}, 6–2.

Oleksandra Oliynykova was the defending champion, but chose to compete in Singapore instead.

== Seeds ==
1. (Switzerland) Simona Waltert (withdrew)
2. (Spain) Oksana Selekhmeteva (semifinals)
3. (Austria) Julia Grabher (champion)
4. (Czech Republic) Laura Samson (first round)
5. (Spain) Leyre Romero Gormaz (second round)
6. (Slovenia) Veronika Erjavec (second round, retired)
7. (Georgia (country)) Ekaterine Gorgodze (quarterfinals)
8. (Switzerland) Rebeka Masarova (quarterfinals)
9. (Spain) Guiomar Maristany (final)

== Draw ==
Key

- Q = Qualifier
- WC = Wild card
- LL = Lucky loser
- Alt = Alternate
- ITF = ITF entry
- PR = Protected ranking
- SR = Special ranking
- SE = Special exempt
- JE = Junior exempt
- JR = Junior Accelerator Programme entrant
- CO = College Accelerator Programme entrant
- NG = Next Gen Accelerator Program entrant
- w/o = Walkover
- r = Retired
- d = Defaulted

=== Finals ===
Semifinals
9	(Spain) Guiomar Maristany	6	6
Q	(Italy) Jessica Pieri	1	2
3	(Austria) Julia Grabher	7^{7}	6
2	(Spain) Oksana Selekhmeteva	6^{5}	1

Final
9	(Spain) Guiomar Maristany	6^{5}	2
3	(Austria) Julia Grabher	7^{7}	6

=== Top half ===
First round
9	(Spain) G Maristany	6	6
(Greece) D Papamichail	3	3
WC	(Italy) A Zantedeschi	6	2	3
WC	(Italy) M Lombardini	4	6	6
WC	(Italy) IM Șerban	6	6
LL	(Czech Republic) A Laboutková	3	4
Q	(Sweden) L Zaar	7	1	5
8	(Switzerland) R Masarova	5	6	7
4	(Czech Republic) L Samson	3	4
(Italy) N Basiletti	6	6
(Serbia) M Ristić	4	6	6
(Netherlands) A Rus	6	0	3
Q	(Italy) J Pieri	6	6
WC	(Italy) G De Angelis	2	0
(Slovenia) P Hercog	7^{7}	1	6^{3}
5	(Spain) L Romero Gormaz	6^{4}	6	7^{7}

Second round
9	(Spain) G Maristany	6	6
WC	(Italy) M Lombardini	2	3
WC	(Italy) IM Șerban	7	2	0
8	(Switzerland) R Masarova	5	6	6
(Italy) N Basiletti	3	6	3
(Serbia) M Ristić	6	3	6
Q	(Italy) J Pieri	3	6	6
5	(Spain) L Romero Gormaz	6	4	1

Quarterfinals
9	(Spain) G Maristany	6	6
8	(Switzerland) R Masarova	4	3
(Serbia) M Ristić	4	4
Q	(Italy) J Pieri	6	6

Semifinals
9	(Spain) G Maristany	6	6
Q	(Italy) J Pieri	1	2

=== Bottom half ===
First round
6	(Slovenia) V Erjavec	4	6	6
Q	(Switzerland) K Tsygourova	6	3	4
(Italy) N Brancaccio	6	4	6
(Argentina) ML Carlé	3	6	4
(France) A Tubello	6	6
Q	(Italy) D Spiteri	2	2
(Italy) J Ruggeri	6	5	3
3	(Austria) J Grabher	4	7	6
7	(Georgia (country)) E Gorgodze	6	5	6
(Brazil) L Pigossi	1	7	3
(Czech Republic) B Palicová	6^{5}	6	7
SE	(Spain) A Herrero Liñana	7^{7}	1	5
(Czech Republic) J Štruplová	0	2
(Italy) S De Stefano	6	6
(Italy) F Urgesi	5	6	5
2	(Spain) O Selekhmeteva	7	0	7

Second round
6	(Slovenia) V Erjavec	7	3^{r}
(Italy) N Brancaccio	5	5
(France) A Tubello	6	3	4
3	(Austria) J Grabher	3	6	6
7	(Georgia (country)) E Gorgodze	7	7
(Czech Republic) B Palicová	5	5
(Italy) S De Stefano	7	1	2
2	(Spain) O Selekhmeteva	5	6	6

Quarterfinals
(Italy) N Brancaccio	6	1	4
3	(Austria) J Grabher	2	6	6
7	(Georgia (country)) E Gorgodze	1	6	2
2	(Spain) O Selekhmeteva	6	2	6

Semifinals
3	(Austria) J Grabher	7^{7}	6
2	(Spain) O Selekhmeteva	6^{5}	1

== Qualifying ==
=== Seeds ===
1. (Sweden) Lisa Zaar (qualified)
2. (Italy) Dalila Spiteri (qualified)
3. (Italy) Jessica Pieri (qualified)
4. (Czech Republic) Aneta Laboutková (qualifying competition, lucky loser)
5. (Switzerland) Katerina Tsygourova (qualified)
6. (Croatia) Iva Primorac (qualifying competition)
7. (Czech Republic) Aneta Kučmová (qualifying competition)
8. (Italy) Enola Chiesa (qualifying competition)

=== Qualifiers ===
1. (Sweden) Lisa Zaar
2. (Italy) Dalila Spiteri
3. (Italy) Jessica Pieri
4. (Switzerland) Katerina Tsygourova

=== Lucky loser ===
1. (Czech Republic) Aneta Laboutková

=== Draw ===
==== First qualifier ====
First round
1	(Sweden) Lisa Zaar	6	6
WC	(Italy) Arianna Ovarelli	2	1
(Slovenia) Alja Senica	6	4	3
8	(Italy) Enola Chiesa	4	6	6

Qualifying competition
1	(Sweden) Lisa Zaar	3	6	7^{8}
8	(Italy) Enola Chiesa	6	3	6^{6}

==== Second qualifier ====
First round
2	(Italy) Dalila Spiteri	6	6
(Germany) Laura Böhner	4	2
(United States) Jamilah Snells	2	6	3
6	(Croatia) Iva Primorac	6	2	6

Qualifying competition
2	(Italy) Dalila Spiteri	6	6
6	(Croatia) Iva Primorac	3	4

==== Third qualifier ====
First round
3	(Italy) Jessica Pieri	7	6
(Germany) Yana Morderger	5	3
WC	(Italy) Silvia Dalle Molle	1	3
7	(Czech Republic) Aneta Kučmová	6	6

Qualifying competition
3	(Italy) Jessica Pieri	6	6
7	(Czech Republic) Aneta Kučmová	0	3

==== Fourth qualifier ====
First round
4	(Czech Republic) Aneta Laboutková	6	6
(Romania) Maria Toma	2	1
(Germany) Tayisiya Morderger	3	3
5	(Switzerland) Katerina Tsygourova	6	6

Qualifying competition
4	(Czech Republic) Aneta Laboutková	2	2
5	(Switzerland) Katerina Tsygourova	6	6
