= 2025 Kyotec Open – Doubles =

Doubles
- 2025 Kyotec Open

Final
- Champions: (United Kingdom) Emily Appleton (Belgium) Magali Kempen
- Runners-up: (Spain) Yvonne Cavallé Reimers (Italy) Angelica Moratelli
- Score: 6–3, 3–6, [10–6]

Events
Singles	Doubles
- ITF Roller Open

Alevtina Ibragimova and Lian Tran were the reigning champions, but chose not to participate this year.

Emily Appleton and Magali Kempen won the title, defeating Yvonne Cavallé Reimers and Angelica Moratelli in the final; 6–3, 3–6, [10–6]

== Seeds ==
1. (United Kingdom) Emily Appleton / (Belgium) Magali Kempen (champions)
2. (Spain) Yvonne Cavallé Reimers / (Italy) Angelica Moratelli (final)
3. Ekaterina Ovcharenko / (United Kingdom) Emily Webley-Smith (first round)
4. (Germany) Noma Noha Akugue / (Bosnia and Herzegovina) Anita Wagner (semifinals, withdrew)

== Draw ==
Key

- Q = Qualifier
- WC = Wild card
- LL = Lucky loser
- Alt = Alternate
- ITF = ITF entry
- PR = Protected ranking
- SR = Special ranking
- SE = Special exempt
- JE = Junior exempt
- JR = Junior Accelerator Programme entrant
- CO = College Accelerator Programme entrant
- NG = Next Gen Accelerator Program entrant
- w/o = Walkover
- r = Retired
- d = Defaulted

=== Draw ===
First round
WC	(Luxembourg) L Correia (Belgium) F Fedeli	3	3
(Luxembourg) O Wagner (Netherlands) M Woo	6	6
3	E Ovcharenko (United Kingdom) E Webley-Smith	6^{6}	3
(Switzerland) C Fontenel (Luxembourg) M Weckerle	7^{8}	6
(Belgium) P Bakhmutkina (Germany) M Hodzic	6	6
(Germany) J Daems (Ukraine) A Firman	3	3
(Germany) L Böhner (Ukraine) V Podrez	6	6
(Germany) A Lazar (Germany) V Sandberg	3	1
(Czech Republic) B Palicová (Cyprus) R Șerban	3	2
4	(Germany) N Noha Akugue (Bosnia and Herzegovina) A Wagner	6	6
(Italy) S De Stefano (Italy) V Paganetti	6	6
(Germany) T Morderger (Germany) Y Morderger	4	2

Quarterfinals
1	(United Kingdom) E Appleton (Belgium) M Kempen	6	6
(Luxembourg) O Wagner (Netherlands) M Woo	1	3
(Switzerland) C Fontenel (Luxembourg) M Weckerle	2	3
(Belgium) P Bakhmutkina (Germany) M Hodzic	6	6
(Germany) L Böhner (Ukraine) V Podrez	6^{4}	1
4	(Germany) N Noha Akugue (Bosnia and Herzegovina) A Wagner	7^{7}	6
(Italy) S De Stefano (Italy) V Paganetti	1	6	[7]
2	(Spain) Y Cavallé Reimers (Italy) A Moratelli	6	4	[10]

Semifinals
1	(United Kingdom) E Appleton (Belgium) M Kempen	6	6
(Belgium) P Bakhmutkina (Germany) M Hodzic	3	2
4	(Germany) N Noha Akugue (Bosnia and Herzegovina) A Wagner
2	(Spain) Y Cavallé Reimers (Italy) A Moratelli	w/o

Final
1	(United Kingdom) E Appleton (Belgium) M Kempen	6	3	[10]
2	(Spain) Y Cavallé Reimers (Italy) A Moratelli	3	6	[6]
