= 2026 Generali Open Ladies Kitzbühel – Singles =

Singles
- 2026 Generali Open Ladies Kitzbühel

Final
- Champion: (Austria) Sinja Kraus
- Runner-up: (Austria) Julia Grabher
- Score: 6–3, 6–1

Details
- Draw: 32 (4Q / 4WC)
- Seeds: 8

Events
Singles	Doubles
- Generali Open Ladies

This was the first edition of the tournament.

Sinja Kraus won the title, defeating Julia Grabher 6–3, 6–1 in the final.

== Seeds ==
1. (Slovenia) Veronika Erjavec (semifinals)
2. (Austria) Sinja Kraus (champion)
3. (Germany) Tatjana Maria (withdrew)
4. (Austria) Julia Grabher (final)
5. (Spain) Marina Bassols Ribera (semifinals)
6. (Czech Republic) Laura Samson (second round)
7. (Belgium) Jeline Vandromme (quarterfinals)
8. (Greece) Despina Papamichail (first round)

== Draw ==
Key

- Q = Qualifier
- WC = Wild card
- LL = Lucky loser
- Alt = Alternate
- ITF = ITF entry
- PR = Protected ranking
- SR = Special ranking
- SE = Special exempt
- JE = Junior exempt
- JR = Junior Accelerator Programme entrant
- CO = College Accelerator Programme entrant
- NG = Next Gen Accelerator Program entrant
- w/o = Walkover
- r = Retired
- d = Defaulted

=== Finals ===
Semifinals
1	(Slovenia) Veronika Erjavec	1	4
4	(Austria) Julia Grabher	6	6
5	(Spain) Marina Bassols Ribera	6	4	1
2	(Austria) Sinja Kraus	3	6	6

Final
4	(Austria) Julia Grabher	3	1
2	(Austria) Sinja Kraus	6	6

=== Top half ===
First round
1	(Slovenia) V Erjavec	6	6^{3}	6
Q	(Argentina) V Bosio	3	7^{7}	4
(Germany) M Barthel	6	6^{8}	6
WC	(Austria) A Koller	2	7^{10}	4
J Avdeeva	2	2
Q	(Poland) G Feistel	6	6
(Brazil) L Pigossi	7	4	6^{4}
6	(Czech Republic) L Samson	5	6	7^{7}
4	(Austria) J Grabher	6	5	6
(Romania) ER Bertea	3	7	4
(Morocco) Y Kabbaj	6	4	3
WC	(Austria) E Perelygina	2	6	6
(Slovenia) P Hercog	6	2	6
Q	(Slovenia) D Jakupović	2	6	4
(United States) V Wolff	1	6^{3}
7	(Belgium) J Vandromme	6	7^{7}

Second round
1	(Slovenia) V Erjavec	6	6
(Germany) M Barthel	4	1
Q	(Poland) G Feistel	6	6
6	(Czech Republic) L Samson	3	1
4	(Austria) J Grabher	7	6
WC	(Austria) E Perelygina	5	3
(Slovenia) P Hercog	4	0^{r}
7	(Belgium) J Vandromme	6	3

Quarterfinals
1	(Slovenia) V Erjavec	6	7
Q	(Poland) G Feistel	2	5
4	(Austria) J Grabher	6	7^{7}
7	(Belgium) J Vandromme	2	6^{5}

Semifinals
1	(Slovenia) V Erjavec	4	1
4	(Austria) J Grabher	6	6

=== Bottom half ===
First round
5	(Spain) M Bassols Ribera	6	6
(Germany) A-L Friedsam	2	1
WC	(Austria) L Rabl	1	0
(Netherlands) A Rus	6	6
(Argentina) ML Carlé	6	2	6
(Liechtenstein) K von Deichmann	3	6	4
Q	(Italy) M Colmegna	6	6^{4}	1
LL	(Czech Republic) B Palicová	3	7^{7}	6
8	(Greece) D Papamichail	2	1
E Andreeva	6	6
(Serbia) M Ristić	6	7
(Slovakia) M Pohánková	3	5
A Tikhonova	4	5
WC	(Germany) E Bennemann	6	7
(Sweden) C Hennemann	6^{3}	3
2	(Austria) S Kraus	7^{7}	6

Second round
5	(Spain) M Bassols Ribera	0	6	6
(Netherlands) A Rus	6	1	1
(Argentina) ML Carlé	0	6	6
LL	(Czech Republic) B Palicová	6	1	3
E Andreeva	6	2	6
(Serbia) M Ristić	4	6	2
WC	(Germany) E Bennemann	1	1
2	(Austria) S Kraus	6	6

Quarterfinals
5	(Spain) M Bassols Ribera	6	6
(Argentina) ML Carlé	2	1
E Andreeva	4	1
2	(Austria) S Kraus	6	6

Semifinals
5	(Spain) M Bassols Ribera	6	4	1
2	(Austria) S Kraus	3	6	6

== Qualifying ==
=== Seeds ===
1. (Czech Republic) Barbora Palicová (qualifying competition, lucky loser)
2. (Poland) Gina Feistel (qualified)
3. (France) Margaux Rouvroy (qualifying competition)
4. (Argentina) Victoria Bosio (qualified)

=== Qualifiers ===
1. (Italy) Martina Colmegna
2. (Poland) Gina Feistel
3. (Slovenia) Dalila Jakupović
4. (Argentina) Victoria Bosio

=== Lucky loser ===
1. (Czech Republic) Barbora Palicová

=== Qualifying draw ===
==== First qualifier ====
Qualifying competition
1	(Czech Republic) Barbora Palicová	3	6^{2}
	(Italy) Martina Colmegna	6	7^{7}

==== Second qualifier ====
Qualifying competition
2/WC	(Poland) Gina Feistel	6	6
	(Italy) Diletta Cherubini	2	2

==== Third qualifier ====
Qualifying competition
3	(France) Margaux Rouvroy	1	1
	(Slovenia) Dalila Jakupović	6	6

==== Fourth qualifier ====
Qualifying competition
4	(Argentina) Victoria Bosio	6	6
WC	(Ukraine) Karina Kovalchuk	3	4
