= 2025 Kyotec Open – Singles =

Singles
- 2025 Kyotec Open

Final
- Champion: (Germany) Eva Bennemann
- Runner-up: (Belgium) Jeline Vandromme
- Score: 6–3, 6–2

Events
Singles	Doubles
- ITF Roller Open

Céline Naef was the defending champion, but chose not to participate.

Eva Bennemann won the title, defeating Jeline Vandromme in the final; 6–3, 6–2.

== Seeds ==
1. Oksana Selekhmeteva (quarterfinals)
2. (Romania) Elena-Gabriela Ruse (second round)
3. (Italy) Lucia Bronzetti (second round)
4. (Croatia) Petra Marčinko (second round)
5. (Belgium) Hanne Vandewinkel (first round, retired)
6. (Uzbekistan) Maria Timofeeva (semifinals)
7. (Ukraine) Daria Snigur (first round, retired)
8. (Serbia) Teodora Kostović (second round)

== Draw ==
Key

- Q = Qualifier
- WC = Wild card
- LL = Lucky loser
- Alt = Alternate
- ITF = ITF entry
- PR = Protected ranking
- SR = Special ranking
- SE = Special exempt
- JE = Junior exempt
- JR = Junior Accelerator Programme entrant
- CO = College Accelerator Programme entrant
- NG = Next Gen Accelerator Program entrant
- w/o = Walkover
- r = Retired
- d = Defaulted

=== Finals ===
Semifinals
WC	(Belgium) Jeline Vandromme	6	6
6	(Uzbekistan) Maria Timofeeva	4	0
(Czech Republic) Barbora Palicová	1	2
Q	(Germany) Eva Bennemann	6	6

Final
WC	(Belgium) Jeline Vandromme	3	2
Q	(Germany) Eva Bennemann	6	6

=== Top half ===
First round
1	O Selekhmeteva	6	1	6
J Avdeeva	4	6	3
WC	(France) O Dodin	4	1
(Germany) N Noha Akugue	6	6
(Ukraine) V Podrez	1	4
WC	(Belgium) J Vandromme	6	6
Q	(Italy) S De Stefano	6	1
5	(Belgium) H Vandewinkel	3	0^{r}
3	(Italy) L Bronzetti	6	6
WC	(Luxembourg) M Weckerle	2	1
(Germany) M Barthel	6	6
Q	E Ovcharenko	0	1
(France) T Andrianjafitrimo	4	0^{r}
Q	(Germany) M Hodzic	6	4
Q	(Spain) M Martínez Vaquero	2	3
6	(Uzbekistan) M Timofeeva	6	6

Second round
1	O Selekhmeteva	6	6
(Germany) N Noha Akugue	4	2
WC	(Belgium) J Vandromme	6	6
Q	(Italy) S De Stefano	2	4
3	(Italy) L Bronzetti	3	3
(Germany) M Barthel	6	6
Q	(Germany) M Hodzic	4	3
6	(Uzbekistan) M Timofeeva	6	6

Quarterfinals
1	O Selekhmeteva	5	6^{3}
WC	(Belgium) J Vandromme	7	7^{7}
(Germany) M Barthel	3	0
6	(Uzbekistan) M Timofeeva	6	6

Semifinals
WC	(Belgium) J Vandromme	6	6
6	(Uzbekistan) M Timofeeva	4	0

=== Bottom half ===
First round
8	(Serbia) T Kostović	6	2	6
Q	(Switzerland) C Fontenel	4	6	4
Q	(Germany) J Daems	1	0
(Spain) M Bassols Ribera	6	6
WC	(Belgium) P Bakhmutkina	0	4
(Czech Republic) B Palicová	6	6
(Spain) G García Pérez	1	3
4	(Croatia) P Marčinko	6	6
7	(Ukraine) D Snigur	1^{r}
(Cyprus) R Șerban	5
(Netherlands) A Hartono	1	6	1
(Netherlands) A Vrancken Peeters	6	3	6
Q	(Germany) E Bennemann	6	6
Q	(Netherlands) J Gimbrère	1	3
(Liechtenstein) K von Deichmann	4	1
2	(Romania) E-G Ruse	6	6

Second round
8	(Serbia) T Kostović	5	7^{7}	3
(Spain) M Bassols Ribera	7	6^{1}	6
(Czech Republic) B Palicová	6	2	7
4	(Croatia) P Marčinko	2	6	5
(Cyprus) R Șerban	6	6
(Netherlands) A Vrancken Peeters	3	4
Q	(Germany) E Bennemann	7^{7}	7^{8}
2	(Romania) E-G Ruse	6^{5}	6^{6}

Quarterfinals
(Spain) M Bassols Ribera	3	0
(Czech Republic) B Palicová	6	6
(Cyprus) R Șerban	1	5
Q	(Germany) E Bennemann	6	7

Semifinals
(Czech Republic) B Palicová	1	2
Q	(Germany) E Bennemann	6	6
