= 2025 Tolentino Open – Doubles =

Doubles
- 2025 Tolentino Open

Final
- Champions: (Czech Republic) Jesika Malečková (Czech Republic) Miriam Škoch
- Runners-up: (Italy) Silvia Ambrosio (Italy) Nuria Brancaccio
- Score: 6–3, 3–6, [10–8]

Events
Singles	Doubles
Tolentino Open	· 2026 →

Jesika Malečková and Miriam Škoch won the title, defeating Silvia Ambrosio and Nuria Brancaccio in the final, 6–3, 3–6, [10–8].

This was the first edition of the tournament.

== Seeds ==
1. (Czech Republic) Jesika Malečková / (Czech Republic) Miriam Škoch (champions)
2. (United Kingdom) Alicia Barnett / (France) Elixane Lechemia (first round)
3. Amina Anshba / (United Kingdom) Eden Silva (quarterfinals)
4. (Italy) Angelica Moratelli / (Italy) Aurora Zantedeschi (semifinals)

== Draw ==
=== Key ===
- Q = Qualifier
- WC = Wild card
- LL = Lucky loser
- Alt = Alternate
- ITF = ITF entry
- PR = Protected ranking
- SR = Special ranking
- SE = Special exempt
- JE = Junior exempt
- JR = Junior Accelerator Programme entrant
- CO = College Accelerator Programme entrant
- NG = Next Gen Accelerator Program entrant
- w/o = Walkover
- r = Retired
- d = Defaulted

=== Draw ===
First round
1	(Czech Republic) J Malečková (Czech Republic) M Škoch	6	3	[10]
(Czech Republic) A Kučmová (Germany) C Werner	4	6	[5]
(Georgia (country)) E Gorgodze (Latvia) D Semeņistaja	6	6
(Australia) A Osborne (India) V Shinde	2	4
4	(Italy) A Moratelli (Italy) A Zantedeschi	6	6
(Italy) N Basiletti (Italy) F Urgesi	4	2
(United Kingdom) F Christie (Bosnia and Herzegovina) A Wagner	4	4
(Germany) N Noha Akugue (Turkey) İ Öz	6	6
(United Kingdom) S Anane (Sweden) J Saner	2	0
(Slovenia) D Jakupović (Slovenia) N Radišić	6	6
(Czech Republic) D Šalková (Croatia) T Würth
3	A Anshba (United Kingdom) E Silva	w/o
(Netherlands) A Rus (Slovenia) T Zidanšek	6	6
(Italy) S Rocchetti (Italy) J Ruggeri	1	4
(Italy) S Ambrosio (Italy) N Brancaccio	6	4	[11]
2	(United Kingdom) A Barnett (France) E Lechemia	1	6	[9]

Quarterfinals
1	(Czech Republic) J Malečková (Czech Republic) M Škoch	6	6
(Georgia (country)) E Gorgodze (Latvia) D Semeņistaja	3	3
4	(Italy) A Moratelli (Italy) A Zantedeschi	6	5	[10]
(Germany) N Noha Akugue (Turkey) İ Öz	4	7	[6]
(Slovenia) D Jakupović (Slovenia) N Radišić	6	6
3	A Anshba (United Kingdom) E Silva	3	1
(Netherlands) A Rus (Slovenia) T Zidanšek	5	7^{7}	[6]
(Italy) S Ambrosio (Italy) N Brancaccio	7	6^{3}	[10]

Semifinals
1	(Czech Republic) J Malečková (Czech Republic) M Škoch	6	2	[10]
4	(Italy) A Moratelli (Italy) A Zantedeschi	2	6	[6]
(Slovenia) D Jakupović (Slovenia) N Radišić	2	0
(Italy) S Ambrosio (Italy) N Brancaccio	6	6

Final
1	(Czech Republic) J Malečková (Czech Republic) M Škoch	6	3	[10]
(Italy) S Ambrosio (Italy) N Brancaccio	3	6	[8]
