= 2026 Zavarovalnica Triglav Ljubljana =

- Date: 14–20 September
- Edition: 4th
- Category: WTA 125
- Draw: 32S / 16D
- Prize money: €100,000
- Surface: Clay
- Location: Ljubljana, Slovenia
- Venue: Tivoli Tennis Center

Champions

Singles
- (Italy) Samira De Stefano

Doubles
- (Croatia) Lucija Ćirić Bagarić / (Italy) Angelica Moratelli
- Ljubljana Open

The 2026 WTA Zavarovalnica Triglav Ljubljana was a professional women's tennis tournament played on outdoor clay courts. It was the fourth edition of the tournament and part of the 2026 WTA 125 tournaments. It took place at the Tivoli Tennis Center in Ljubljana, Slovenia between 14 and 20 September 2026.

== Singles entrants ==
=== Seeds ===
Country	Player	Rank^{1}	Seed
GBR	Francesca Jones	104	1
CZE	Laura Samson	116	2
SRB	Lola Radivojević	150	3
HUN	Dalma Gálfi	157	4
GEO	Ekaterine Gorgodze	161	5
UKR	Anastasiia Sobolieva	194	6
SRB	Mia Ristić	195	7
CZE	Barbora Palicová	198	8

- ^{1} Rankings are as of 31 August 2026.

=== Other entrants ===
The following players received a wildcard into the singles main draw:

- (Slovenia) Pia Lovrič
- (Slovenia) Kristina Novak
- (Slovenia) Alja Senica
- (Czech Republic) Denisa Žoldáková

The following players received entry into the main draw through qualifying:

- (Croatia) Lea Bošković
- (Croatia) Lucija Ćirić Bagarić
- (Italy) Martina Colmegna
- (Slovakia) Radka Zelníčková

=== Withdrawals ===
Before the tournament

- (Czech Republic) Brenda Fruhvirtová → replaced by (Italy) Giorgia Pedone
- (France) Alice Ramé → replaced by (Italy) Samira De Stefano
- (Switzerland) Simona Waltert → replaced by (Poland) Gina Feistel

== Doubles entrants ==
=== Seeds ===
Country	Player	Country	Player	Rank	Seed
FRA	Estelle Cascino	CHN	Feng Shuo	204	1
POL	Weronika Falkowska	GEO	Ekaterine Gorgodze	209	2
CRO	Lucija Ćirić Bagarić	ITA	Angelica Moratelli	246	3
CZE	Aneta Kučmová	CZE	Aneta Laboutková	284	4

- Rankings as of 31 August 2026.

=== Other entrants ===
The following pair received a wildcard into the doubles main draw:

- (Slovenia) Zala Bizjak / (Slovenia) Nala Kovačič

=== Withdrawals ===
During the tournament

- (Italy) Noemi Basiletti / (Italy) Aurora Zantedeschi (Zantedeschi – right elbow injury)
- (Poland) Gina Feistel / (Cyprus) Raluca Șerban (Feistel – illness)

== Champions ==
=== Singles ===
- (Italy) Samira De Stefano def. (Germany) Mona Barthel 3–6, 6–1, 7–5

=== Doubles ===
- (Croatia) Lucija Ćirić Bagarić / (Italy) Angelica Moratelli def. (France) Estelle Cascino / (China) Feng Shuo 6–7^{(4–7)}, 6–4, [10–5]
