= 2026 Generali Open Ladies Kitzbühel – Doubles =

Doubles
- 2026 Generali Open Ladies Kitzbühel

Final
- Champions: (United Kingdom) Alicia Barnett (France) Elixane Lechemia
- Runners-up: (Spain) Yvonne Cavallé Reimers (Brazil) Laura Pigossi
- Score: 6–4, 6–3

Details
- Draw: 8 (1WC)
- Seeds: 2

Events
Singles	Doubles
- Generali Open Ladies Kitzbühel

Alicia Barnett and Elixane Lechemia won the title, defeating Yvonne Cavallé Reimers and Laura Pigossi 6–4, 6–3 in the final.

This was the first edition of the tournament.

== Seeds ==
1. (Ukraine) Valeriya Strakhova / Anastasia Tikhonova (quarterfinals)
2. (Spain) Yvonne Cavallé Reimers / (Brazil) Laura Pigossi (final)

== Draw ==
Key

- Q = Qualifier
- WC = Wild card
- LL = Lucky loser
- Alt = Alternate
- ITF = ITF entry
- PR = Protected ranking
- SR = Special ranking
- SE = Special exempt
- JE = Junior exempt
- JR = Junior Accelerator Programme entrant
- CO = College Accelerator Programme entrant
- NG = Next Gen Accelerator Program entrant
- w/o = Walkover
- r = Retired
- d = Defaulted

=== Draw ===
Quarterfinals
1	(Ukraine) V Strakhova; A Tikhonova	1	1
(United Kingdom) A Barnett (France) E Lechemia	6	6
(Spain) M Bassols Ribera (Greece) D Papamichail	7^{9}	1	[12]
WC	(Germany) A-L Friedsam (Austria) E Perelygina	6^{7}	6	[10]
(Austria) J Grabher (Austria) S Kraus	1	7	[10]
(Czech Republic) M Bayerlová (India) P Thombare	6	5	[4]
(Romania) I Bara (Slovenia) D Jakupović	6^{5}	6	[8]
2	(Spain) Y Cavallé Reimers (Brazil) L Pigossi	7^{7}	2	[10]

Semifinals
(United Kingdom) A Barnett (France) E Lechemia	6	6
(Spain) M Bassols Ribera (Greece) D Papamichail	4	1
(Austria) J Grabher (Austria) S Kraus	2	3
2	(Spain) Y Cavallé Reimers (Brazil) L Pigossi	6	6

Final
(United Kingdom) A Barnett (France) E Lechemia	6	6
2	(Spain) Y Cavallé Reimers (Brazil) L Pigossi	4	3
