= 2005 ITF Roller Open – Singles =

Singles
- 2005 ITF Roller Open

Final
- Champion: (Belarus) Victoria Azarenka
- Runner-up: (Ukraine) Viktoriya Kutuzova
- Score: 6–4, 6–2

Events
Singles	Doubles
- ITF Roller Open

Stanislava Hrozenská was the defending champion, but decided not to participate that year.

Victoria Azarenka won her first singles title here, beating Viktoriya Kutuzova 6–4, 6–2 in the final.

== Seeds ==
1. (Sweden) Sofia Arvidsson (quarterfinals)
2. (Germany) Sandra Klösel (semifinals)
3. (France) Stéphanie Foretz (quarterfinals)
4. (Czech Republic) Hana Šromová (first round)
5. (Austria) Yvonne Meusburger (first round)
6. (Czech Republic) Kateřina Böhmová (second round)
7. (Ukraine) Viktoriya Kutuzova (final)
8. (Czech Republic) Libuše Průšová (first round)

== Draw ==
Key

- Q = Qualifier
- WC = Wild card
- LL = Lucky loser
- Alt = Alternate
- ITF = ITF entry
- PR = Protected ranking
- SR = Special ranking
- SE = Special exempt
- JE = Junior exempt
- JR = Junior Accelerator Programme entrant
- CO = College Accelerator Programme entrant
- NG = Next Gen Accelerator Program entrant
- w/o = Walkover
- r = Retired
- d = Defaulted

=== Finals ===
Semifinals
JE	(Belarus) Victoria Azarenka	7^{9}	6
(Germany) Kathrin Wörle	6^{7}	4
7	(Ukraine) Viktoriya Kutuzova	3	6	6
2/WC	(Germany) Sandra Klösel	6	4	3

Final
JE	(Belarus) Victoria Azarenka	6	6
7	(Ukraine) Viktoriya Kutuzova	4	2

=== Top half ===
First round
1	(Russia) M Sharapova	6	6
LL	(Italy) A Brianti	2	3
(Spain) L Domínguez Lino	6	6^{8}	0
(Czech Republic) R Voráčová	4	7	6
(Czech Republic) Z Ondrášková	1	0
(Hungary) G Arn	6	6
(Austria) T Paszek	3	1
8	(Sweden) S Arvidsson	6	6
4	(Germany) J Görges	6	6
(Spain) A Medina Garrigues	4	0
(Czech Republic) S Záhlavová	6	5	0
(France) A Cornet	3	7	6
PR	(United Kingdom) A Keothavong	6^{4}	6	6
(Romania) E Gallovits-Hall	7	4	0
WC	(Ukraine) K Bondarenko	6	6
6	(Japan) K Date-Krumm	4	3

Second round
1	(Russia) M Sharapova	6	7
(Czech Republic) R Voráčová	3	5
(Hungary) G Arn	4	7	7
8	(Sweden) S Arvidsson	6	5	5
4	(Germany) J Görges	6	6
(France) A Cornet	2	4
PR	(United Kingdom) A Keothavong	5	3
WC	(Ukraine) K Bondarenko	7	6

Quarter Finals
1	(Russia) M Sharapova	2	5
(Hungary) G Arn	6	7
4	(Germany) J Görges	5	6	6
WC	(Ukraine) K Bondarenko	7	2	2

Semi Final
(Hungary) G Arn	7	6
4	(Germany) J Görges	6^{3}	3

=== Bottom half ===
First round
7	(Ukraine) V Kutuzova	7	3	6
(Luxembourg) C Schaul	5	6	4
(Czech Republic) L Němečková	6	6
(Slovakia) J Gajdošová	4	3
LL	(Germany) M Geznenge	2	6	2
Q	(Slovakia) E Fislová	6	1	6
Q	(Venezuela) L Vallverdu-Zafra	2	4
3	(France) S Foretz	6	6
6	(Czech Republic) K Böhmová	7^{7}	6
Q	(Italy) K Knapp	6^{5}	2
PR	(Czech Republic) M Zdenovcová	1	2
(Estonia) K Kanepi	6	6
(Sweden) H Nooni	3	6	6
WC	(Luxembourg) M Minella	6	4	1
WC	(Germany) R Sabay	3	7	1
2/WC	(Germany) S Klösel	6	6^{2}	6

Second round
7	(Ukraine) V Kutuzova	3	6	6
(Czech Republic) L Němečková	6	4	4
(China) S Peng	2	6	6
3	(Russia) S Kuznetsova	6	4	4
7	(Russia) E Vesnina	6	4	0^{r}
(Romania) S Halep	2	6	4
Q	(Germany) S Lisicki	2	6	2
2/WC	(Germany) S Klösel	6	3	6

Quarter Finals
7	(Ukraine) V Kutuzova	4	5
(China) S Peng	6	7
(Romania) S Halep	0	2
2/WC	(Germany) S Klösel	6	6

Semi Final
7	(Ukraine) V Kutuzova	6	6^{3}	5
2/WC	(Germany) S Klösel	3	7	7
