= ITF Roller Open =

ITF Roller Open Kyotec Open
- 2025 Kyotec Open

ITF Women's Tour
- Event name: ITF Roller Open; Kyotec Open
- Location: Pétange, Luxembourg
- Venue: Tennis Club Pétange
- Category: ITF Women's Circuit
- Surface: Hard (i); Clay (2001–2011)
- Draw: 32S/32Q/16D
- Prize money: W100, W75, W50, W25, W15
- Website: Official website

The ITF Roller Open, now known as the Kyotec Open, is an event on the ITF Women's Circuit which has been held as an indoor tournament on hardcourts since 2014, with professional women tennis players playing on open-air clay courts from 2001 to 2011. The tournament is held in Pétange, Luxembourg.

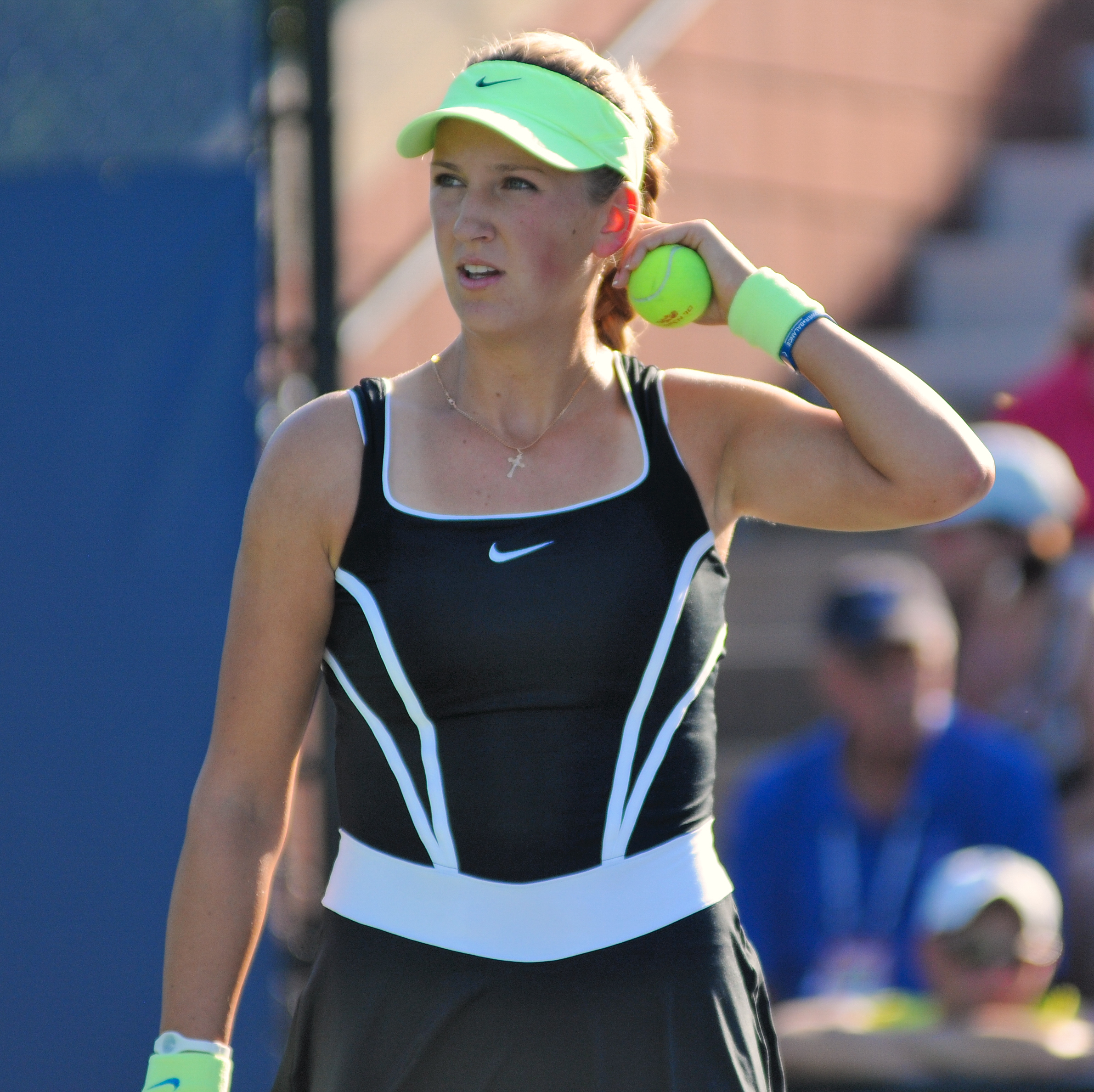
Eventual world number one and multiple grand slam winner Victoria Azarenka won the 2005 edition.

== Past finals ==
=== Singles ===
Year	Champion	Runner-up	Score
2025	(Germany) Eva Bennemann	(Belgium) Jeline Vandromme	6–3, 6–2
2024	(Switzerland) Céline Naef	(France) Océane Dodin	6–2, 6–4
2023	(France) Océane Dodin	(Philippines) Alexandra Eala	6–1, 7–5
2022	(Germany) Mona Barthel	(Ukraine) Daria Snigur	7–6^{(7–2)}, 6–2
2021	(France) Océane Dodin	(Belarus) Anna Kubareva	6–3, 6–1
2020	COVID-19		
2019	(Netherlands) Arantxa Rus	(Romania) Laura-Ioana Paar	6–3, 3–6, 6–3
2018	(Luxembourg) Mandy Minella	(Belgium) Hélène Scholsen	6–2, 6–1
2017	(Belarus) Sviatlana Pirazhenka	(Netherlands) Chayenne Ewijk	6–2, 4–6, 6–0
2016	(France) Elixane Lechemia	(Belgium) Magali Kempen	6–3, 6–0
2015	(Belgium) Greet Minnen	(Slovakia) Michaela Hončová	6–0, 3–6, 6–3
2014	(China) Lu Jiajing	(Slovakia) Michaela Hončová	6–1, ret.
2012–13	not held		
2011	(France) Mathilde Johansson	(Czech Republic) Petra Cetkovská	7–5, 6–3
2010	(France) Mathilde Johansson	(Romania) Monica Niculescu	6–3, 6–3
2009	(Spain) Arantxa Parra Santonja	(Russia) Ekaterina Bychkova	6–3, 6–2
2008	(France) Mathilde Johansson	(Czech Republic) Renata Voráčová	2–6, 7–5, 7–5
2007	(France) Pauline Parmentier	(Germany) Martina Müller	6–1, 6–4
2006	(Ukraine) Yuliya Beygelzimer	(Belgium) Kirsten Flipkens	5–7, 7–6^{(8–6)}, 6–4
2005	(Belarus) Victoria Azarenka	(Ukraine) Viktoriya Kutuzova	6–4, 6–2
2004	(Slovakia) Stanislava Hrozenská	(South Africa) Chanelle Scheepers	6–7^{(10–12)}, 6–1, 6–4
2003	(Germany) Angelika Bachmann	(Germany) Bianka Lamade	6–4, 7–6^{(7–5)}
2002	(Belgium) Kirsten Flipkens	(Germany) Tanja Hirschauer	4–6, 6–2, 6–1
2001	(Germany) Nicole Seitenbecher	(Estonia) Ilona Poljakova	6–2, 3–6, 6–2

=== Doubles ===
Year	Champions	Runners-up	Score
2025	(United Kingdom) Emily Appleton (Belgium) Magali Kempen	(Spain) Yvonne Cavallé Reimers (Italy) Angelica Moratelli	6–3, 3–6, [10–6]
2024	Alevtina Ibragimova (Netherlands) Lian Tran	(Czech Republic) Jesika Malečková (Czech Republic) Miriam Škoch	1–6, 6–2, [11–9]
2023	(United Kingdom) Alicia Barnett (United Kingdom) Samantha Murray Sharan	(United Kingdom) Ali Collins (Netherlands) Isabelle Haverlag	6–7^{(4–7)}, 6–1, [10–6]
2022	(Belgium) Magali Kempen (Switzerland) Xenia Knoll	(Netherlands) Bibiane Schoofs (Netherlands) Rosalie van der Hoek	6–0, 6–4
2021	(Switzerland) Xenia Knoll (Switzerland) Joanne Züger	(France) Julie Belgraver (France) Lucie Nguyen Tan	6–3, 6–3
2020	COVID-19		
2019	(Romania) Laura-Ioana Paar (Germany) Julia Lohoff	(Poland) Katarzyna Piter (Netherlands) Arantxa Rus	7–6^{(13–11)}, 1–6, [11–9]
2018	(Russia) Anastasia Pribylova (Serbia) Nina Stojanović	(Poland) Katarzyna Piter (Slovakia) Chantal Škamlová	2–6, 6–2, [10–8]
2017	(Netherlands) Chayenne Ewijk (Netherlands) Rosalie van der Hoek	(France) Priscilla Heise (Belgium) Déborah Kerfs	6–2, 4–6, [10–8]
2016	(Netherlands) Chayenne Ewijk (Netherlands) Rosalie van der Hoek	(Poland) Justyna Jegiołka (Belgium) Magali Kempen	7–6^{(8–6)}, 6–3
2015	(Belgium) Michaela Boev (Germany) Hristina Dishkova	(United Kingdom) Harriet Dart (France) Manon Arcangioli	6–2, 6–3
2014	(Belgium) Elyne Boeykens (Netherlands) Kelly Versteeg	(Slovakia) Michaela Hončová (Germany) Nora Niedmers	7–6^{(7–2)}, 6–1
2012–13	Not held		
2011	(Sweden) Johanna Larsson (Germany) Jasmin Wöhr	(Germany) Kristina Barrois (Germany) Anna-Lena Grönefeld	7–6^{(7–2)}, 6–4
2010	(Canada) Sharon Fichman (Romania) Monica Niculescu	(France) Sophie Lefèvre (France) Laura Thorpe	6–4, 6–2
2009	(France) Stéphanie Cohen-Aloro (Tunisia) Selima Sfar	(Croatia) Darija Jurak (Germany) Kathrin Wörle	6–2, 3–6, [10–7]
2008	(Italy) Corinna Dentoni (Russia) Anastasia Pivovarova	(France) Stéphanie Foretz (Turkey) İpek Şenoğlu	6–4, 6–1
2007	(Spain) Carla Suárez Navarro (Belarus) Anastasiya Yakimova	(Germany) Martina Müller (Luxembourg) Claudine Schaul	6–7^{(4–7)}, 6–1, 7–6^{(7–1)}
2006	(Argentina) Erica Krauth (Portugal) Frederica Piedade	(Luxembourg) Claudine Schaul (Lithuania) Lina Stančiūtė	6–3, 6–3
2005	(Ukraine) Yuliya Beygelzimer (Germany) Sandra Klösel	(United Kingdom) Claire Curran (Netherlands) Kim Kilsdonk	6–4, 6–0
2004	(Slovakia) Eva Fislová (Slovakia) Stanislava Hrozenská	(Australia) Evie Dominikovic (Russia) Goulnara Fattakhetdinova	6–4, 6–3
2003	(Czech Republic) Iveta Gerlová (Slovakia) Andrea Masaryková	(Germany) Bianka Lamade (Germany) Nicole Ludwig	6–2, 5–7, 7–6^{(7–1)}
2002	(Czech Republic) Zuzana Černá (Czech Republic) Iveta Gerlová	(Slovakia) Dominika Diešková (Slovakia) Lenka Tvarosková	1–6, 6–1, 6–3
2001	(Belgium) Elke Clijsters (Australia) Jaslyn Hewitt	(Belarus) Natallia Dziamidzenka (Netherlands) Kika Hogendoorn	6–1, 6–3
