= 2026 Zavarovalnica Triglav Ljubljana – Singles =

Singles
- 2026 Zavarovalnica Triglav Ljubljana

Final
- Champion: (Italy) Samira De Stefano
- Runner-up: (Germany) Mona Barthel
- Score: 3–6, 6–1, 7–5

Details
- Draw: 32 (4 WC)
- Seeds: 8

Events
Singles	Doubles
- BMW Ljubljana Open

Kaja Juvan was the reigning champion, but did not participate this year.

Samira De Stefano won the title, defeating Mona Barthel 3–6, 6–1, 7–5 in the final.

== Seeds ==
1. (United Kingdom) Francesca Jones (second round)
2. (Czech Republic) Laura Samson (semifinals)
3. (Serbia) Lola Radivojević (first round)
4. (Hungary) Dalma Gálfi (second round)
5. (Georgia (country)) Ekaterine Gorgodze (quarterfinals)
6. (Ukraine) Anastasiia Sobolieva (quarterfinals)
7. (Serbia) Mia Ristić (quarterfinals)
8. (Czech Republic) Barbora Palicová (second round)

== Draw ==
Key

- Q = Qualifier
- WC = Wild card
- LL = Lucky loser
- Alt = Alternate
- ITF = ITF entry
- PR = Protected ranking
- SR = Special ranking
- SE = Special exempt
- JE = Junior exempt
- JR = Junior Accelerator Programme entrant
- CO = College Accelerator Programme entrant
- NG = Next Gen Accelerator Program entrant
- w/o = Walkover
- r = Retired
- d = Defaulted

=== Finals ===
Semifinals
(Germany) Mona Barthel	6	6
(Italy) Noemi Basiletti	4	0
(Italy) Samira De Stefano	6	1	6
2	(Czech Republic) Laura Samson	3	6	4

Final
(Germany) Mona Barthel	6	1	5
(Italy) Samira De Stefano	3	6	7

=== Top half ===
First round
1	(United Kingdom) F Jones	5	6	6
WC	(Slovenia) A Senica	7	3	3
(Germany) M Barthel	6	6
Q	(Slovakia) R Zelníčková	0	4
(Romania) M Bulgaru	6	1	6
(North Macedonia) L Gjorcheska	4	6	2
Q	(Italy) M Colmegna	5	6^{3}
7	(Serbia) M Ristić	7	7^{7}
3	(Serbia) L Radivojević	6^{7}	4
(Italy) N Basiletti	7^{9}	6
(Slovenia) P Hercog	6^{5}	2
(Czech Republic) J Štruplová	7^{7}	6
(Czech Republic) L Havlíčková	6	6
(Italy) A Zantedeschi	2	3
(Argentina) ML Carlé	5	7^{7}	4
5	(Georgia (country)) E Gorgodze	7	6^{2}	6

Second round
1	(United Kingdom) F Jones	0	4
(Germany) M Barthel	6	6
(Romania) M Bulgaru	3	3
7	(Serbia) M Ristić	6	6
(Italy) N Basiletti	6	6
(Czech Republic) J Štruplová	2	3
(Czech Republic) L Havlíčková	6^{4}	6	3
5	(Georgia (country)) E Gorgodze	7^{7}	1	6

Quarterfinals
(Germany) M Barthel	6	6
7	(Serbia) M Ristić	2	2
(Italy) N Basiletti	6	6
5	(Georgia (country)) E Gorgodze	3	1

Semifinals
(Germany) M Barthel	6	6
(Italy) N Basiletti	4	0

=== Bottom half ===
First round
8	(Czech Republic) B Palicová	7	6
(Poland) G Feistel	5	1
(Netherlands) A Rus	6	3	3
(Italy) S De Stefano	1	6	6
(France) A Tubello	6	6
(United States) V Wolff	4	3
WC	(Slovenia) P Lovrič	4	1
4	(Hungary) D Gálfi	6	6
6	(Ukraine) A Sobolieva	6	7
Q	(Croatia) L Bošković	2	5
(Italy) G Pedone	1	1
WC	(Czech Republic) D Žoldáková	6	6
(Poland) W Falkowska	2	7^{9}	6
WC	(Slovenia) K Novak	6	6^{7}	2
Q	(Croatia) L Ćirić Bagarić	3	2
2	(Czech Republic) L Samson	6	6

Second round
8	(Czech Republic) B Palicová	1	5
(Italy) S De Stefano	6	7
(France) A Tubello	6	6
4	(Hungary) D Gálfi	3	4
6	(Ukraine) A Sobolieva	7	6
WC	(Czech Republic) D Žoldáková	5	4
(Poland) W Falkowska	7^{8}	0	3
2	(Czech Republic) L Samson	6^{6}	6	6

Quarterfinals
(Italy) S De Stefano	4	7^{7}	6
(France) A Tubello	6	6^{2}	4
6	(Ukraine) A Sobolieva	4	1
2	(Czech Republic) L Samson	6	6

Semifinals
(Italy) S De Stefano	6	1	6
2	(Czech Republic) L Samson	3	6	4

== Qualifying ==
=== Seeds ===
1. (Italy) Deborah Chiesa (qualifying competition)
2. (Croatia) Lea Bošković (qualified)
3. (Slovakia) Radka Zelníčková (qualified)
4. (Italy) Martina Colmegna (qualified)

=== Qualifiers ===
1. (Croatia) Lucija Ćirić Bagarić
2. (Croatia) Lea Bošković
3. (Slovenia) Radka Zelníčková
4. (Italy) Martina Colmegna

=== Qualifying draw ===
==== First qualifier ====
Qualifying competition
1	(Italy) Deborah Chiesa	6	4	2
	(Croatia) Lucija Ćirić Bagarić	4	6	6

==== Second qualifier ====
Qualifying competition
2	(Croatia) Lea Bošković	6^{6}	7^{7}	6
	(Cyprus) Raluca Șerban	7^{8}	6^{5}	2

==== Third qualifier ====
Qualifying competition
3	(Slovakia) Radka Zelníčková	6	6
WC	(Slovenia) Kaja Najzer	2	3

==== Fourth qualifier ====
Qualifying competition
4	(Italy) Martina Colmegna	6	6
WC	(United States) Gabriella Price	2	3
