= 2026 Zavarovalnica Triglav Ljubljana – Doubles =

Doubles
- 2026 Zavarovalnica Triglav Ljubljana

Final
- Champions: (Croatia) Lucija Ćirić Bagarić (Italy) Angelica Moratelli
- Runners-up: (France) Estelle Cascino (China) Feng Shuo
- Score: 6–7^{(4–7)}, 6–4, [10–5]

Events
Singles	Doubles
- BMW Ljubljana Open

Miriam Škoch and Simona Waltert were the reigning champions, but Škoch chose to play in Guadalajara instead and Waltert did not participate.

Lucija Ćirić Bagarić and Angelica Moratelli won the title, defeating Estelle Cascino and Feng Shuo 6–7^{(4–7)}, 6–4, [10–5] in the final.

== Seeds ==
1. (France) Estelle Cascino / (China) Feng Shuo (final)
2. (Poland) Weronika Falkowska / (Georgia (country)) Ekaterine Gorgodze (quarterfinals)
3. (Croatia) Lucija Ćirić Bagarić / (Italy) Angelica Moratelli (champions)
4. (Czech Republic) Aneta Kučmová / (Czech Republic) Aneta Laboutková (semifinals)

== Draw ==
Key

- Q = Qualifier
- WC = Wild card
- LL = Lucky loser
- Alt = Alternate
- ITF = ITF entry
- PR = Protected ranking
- SR = Special ranking
- SE = Special exempt
- JE = Junior exempt
- JR = Junior Accelerator Programme entrant
- CO = College Accelerator Programme entrant
- NG = Next Gen Accelerator Program entrant
- w/o = Walkover
- r = Retired
- d = Defaulted

=== Draw ===
First round
1	(France) E Cascino (China) S Feng	w/o
(Italy) N Basiletti (Italy) A Zantedeschi
(Czech Republic) B Palicová (Czech Republic) J Štruplová	2	7	[5]
(Slovenia) K Novak (Czech Republic) I Šebestová	6	5	[10]
4	(Czech Republic) A Kučmová (Czech Republic) A Laboutková	6^{4}	6	[11]
(Germany) T Morderger (Germany) Y Morderger	7^{7}	3	[9]
(Slovenia) P Lovrič (Slovenia) A Senica	6	7
(United States) M Lewis (United States) B Walker	2	5
(Poland) G Feistel (Cyprus) R Șerban
(Croatia) M Dražić (France) M Mattel	w/o
WC	(Slovenia) Z Bizjak (Slovenia) N Kovačič	1	3
3	(Croatia) L Ćirić Bagarić (Italy) A Moratelli	6	6
(Serbia) M Ristić (Netherlands) A Rus	3	2
(Italy) D Chiesa (Hungary) A Nagy	6	6
(Italy) M Colmegna (Slovakia) R Zelníčková	0	4
2	(Poland) W Falkowska (Georgia (country)) E Gorgodze	6	6

Quarterfinals
1	(France) E Cascino (China) S Feng	5	6	[10]
(Slovenia) K Novak (Czech Republic) I Šebestová	7	2	[4]
4	(Czech Republic) A Kučmová (Czech Republic) A Laboutková	6	6
(Slovenia) P Lovrič (Slovenia) A Senica	3	1
(Croatia) M Dražić (France) M Mattel	6	5	[2]
3	(Croatia) L Ćirić Bagarić (Italy) A Moratelli	4	7	[10]
(Italy) D Chiesa (Hungary) A Nagy	6	7
2	(Poland) W Falkowska (Georgia (country)) E Gorgodze	4	5

Semifinals
1	(France) E Cascino (China) S Feng	7^{7}	6
4	(Czech Republic) A Kučmová (Czech Republic) A Laboutková	6^{2}	2
3	(Croatia) L Ćirić Bagarić (Italy) A Moratelli	6	6
(Italy) D Chiesa (Hungary) A Nagy	2	2

Final
1	(France) E Cascino (China) S Feng	7^{7}	4	[5]
3	(Croatia) L Ćirić Bagarić (Italy) A Moratelli	6^{4}	6	[10]
