= 2026 Tolentino Open =

Tennis tournament

- Date: 21–27 September 2026
- Edition: 2nd
- Category: WTA 125
- Prize money: €100,000
- Surface: Clay
- Location: Tolentino, Italy

Champions

Singles
- (Austria) Julia Grabher

Doubles
- (Georgia (country)) Ekaterine Gorgodze / (Greece) Despina Papamichail
- Tolentino Open

The 2026 Tolentino Open, also known as Delta Motors Tolentino Open for sponsorship reasons, was a professional women's tennis tournament played on outdoor clay courts. It was the second edition of the tournament and part of the 2026 WTA 125 tournaments. It took place at the Associazione Tennis Tolentino in Tolentino, Italy between 21 and 27 September 2026.

== Singles main-draw entrants ==
=== Seeds ===
Country	Player	Rank^{1}	Seed
~~SUI~~	~~Simona Waltert~~	~~97~~	~~1~~
ESP	Oksana Selekhmeteva	101	2
AUT	Julia Grabher	111	3
CZE	Laura Samson	118	4
ESP	Leyre Romero Gormaz	145	5
SLO	Veronika Erjavec	147	6
GEO	Ekaterine Gorgodze	152	7
SUI	Rebeka Masarova	177	8
ESP	Guiomar Maristany Zuleta de Reales	178	9

- ^{1} Rankings are as of 14 September 2026.

=== Other entrants ===
The following players received wildcards into the singles main draw:

- (Italy) Ginevra De Angelis
- (Italy) Marta Lombardini
- (Italy) Isabella Maria Șerban
- (Italy) Aurora Zantedeschi

The following players received entry from the qualifying draw:

- (Italy) Jessica Pieri
- (Italy) Dalila Spiteri
- (Switzerland) Katerina Tsygourova
- (Sweden) Lisa Zaar

The following player received entry into the main draw as a lucky loser:

- (Czech Republic) Aneta Laboutková

=== Withdrawals ===
Before the tournament

- (Spain) Irene Burillo → replaced by (Italy) Noemi Basiletti
- (United Kingdom) Francesca Jones → replaced by (Italy) Federica Urgesi
- (Spain) Andrea Lázaro García → replaced by (Italy) Samira De Stefano
- (Poland) Katarzyna Kawa → replaced by (Slovenia) Polona Hercog
- (Ukraine) Anastasiia Sobolieva → replaced by (Czech Republic) Barbora Palicová
- (Switzerland) Simona Waltert → replaced by (Czech Republic) Aneta Laboutková (LL)

=== Retirement ===
- (Slovenia) Veronika Erjavec (right thigh injury)

== Doubles entrants ==
=== Seeds ===
Country	Player	Country	Player	Rank	Seed
ARG	Nicole Fossa Huergo	ESP	Alicia Herrero Liñana	201	1
CZE	Aneta Kučmová	CZE	Aneta Laboutková	237	2
ESP	Irene Burillo	SWE	Lisa Zaar	307	3
ITA	Nuria Brancaccio	ESP	Leyre Romero Gormaz	602	4

- Rankings as of 14 September 2026.

=== Other entrants ===
The following pair received a wildcard into the doubles main draw:

- (Italy) Ginevra De Angelis / (Italy) Arianna Ovarelli

== Champions ==
=== Singles ===
- (Austria) Julia Grabher def. (Spain) Guiomar Maristany Zuleta de Reales 7–6^{(7–5)}, 6–2

=== Doubles ===
- (Georgia (country)) Ekaterine Gorgodze / (Greece) Despina Papamichail def. (Czech Republic) Aneta Kučmová / (Czech Republic) Aneta Laboutková 6–1, 6–2
