= Tolentino Open =

Tennis tournament in Italy

- 2026 Tolentino Open

WTA 125
- Event name: Lexus Tolentino Open
- Location: Tolentino, Italy
- Venue: Circolo Tennis Tolentino
- Category: WTA 125
- Surface: Clay
- Draw: 32S/14Q/16D
- Prize money: €100,000

Current champions (2026)
- Singles: (Austria) Julia Grabher
- Doubles: (Georgia (country)) Ekaterine Gorgodze (Greece) Despina Papamichail

The Tolentino Open is a tournament for professional female tennis players on outdoor clay courts. The event is classified as a WTA 125 tournament and is held at the Circolo Tennis Tolentino in Tolentino, Italy.

== Past finals ==
=== Singles ===
Year	Champion	Runner-up	Score
2025	(Ukraine) Oleksandra Oliynykova	(Italy) Nuria Brancaccio	6–2, 6–0
2026	(Austria) Julia Grabher	(Spain) Guiomar Maristany	7–6^{(7–5)}, 6–2

=== Doubles ===
Year	Champions	Runners-up	Score
2025	(Czech Republic) Jesika Malečková (Czech Republic) Miriam Škoch	(Italy) Silvia Ambrosio (Italy) Nuria Brancaccio	6–3, 3–6, [10–8]
2026	(Georgia (country)) Ekaterine Gorgodze (Greece) Despina Papamichail	(Czech Republic) Aneta Kučmová (Czech Republic) Aneta Laboutková	6–1, 6–2
