= Eva Bennemann =

German tennis player (born 2007)

- Country (sports): Germany
- Born: 5 October 2007 (age 18)
- Plays: Right-handed (two-handed backhand)
- Prize money: US $61,227

Singles
- Career record: 61–39
- Career titles: 3 ITF
- Highest ranking: No. 273 (14 September 2026)
- Current ranking: No. 273 (21 September 2026)

Grand Slam singles results
- Australian Open Junior: 1R (2025)
- French Open Junior: 2R (2025)
- Wimbledon Junior: 1R (2025)
- US Open Junior: 2R (2025)

Doubles
- Career record: 21–17
- Career titles: 1 ITF
- Highest ranking: No. 424 (27 July 2026)
- Current ranking: No. 469 (21 September 2026)

Grand Slam doubles results
- Australian Open Junior: 1R (2025)
- French Open Junior: W (2025)
- Wimbledon Junior: 1R (2025)
- US Open Junior: SF (2025)
- Last updated on: 21 September 2026.

Eva Bennemann (born 5 October 2007) is a German tennis player. She has a career-high WTA singles ranking of world No. 273, achieved on 14 September 2026 and a best doubles ranking of No. 424, attained on 27 July 2026. She won the final of the girls' doubles at the 2025 French Open.

== Career ==
=== Juniors ===
She is from Dorsten in Germany and is a member of Deuten Tennis Club. She was German national runner-up at U16 level.

She finished 2024 as the number one ranked German in her age-group. She made her junior grand slam debut at the 2025 Australian Open, losing in the girls' singles against Czech player Alena Kovačková. She won her first junior grand slam match in the girls singles at the 2025 French Open.

Playing alongside compatriot Sonja Zhenikhova she won the 2025 French Open girls' doubles title, after upsetting the top-seeded team of Emerson Jones and Hannah Klugman in the first round, beating Slovakian Mia Pohánková and Austrian Lilli Tagger in the semifinal, and defeating Alena and Jana Kovackova in the final. Playing alongside Zhenikhova she won the doubles final of the U18 European Junior Championships in September 2025.

=== Professional ===
Awarded a wildcard entry, she reached the final of the first senior tournament of her career on her debut, in Kamen, Germany in June 2024, defeated by Dutch woman Stéphanie Visscher in the final.

== ITF Circuit finals ==
=== Singles: 4 (3 titles, 1 runner-up) ===
Legend W75 tournaments (1–0) W15 tournaments (2–1)	Finals by surface Hard (2–0) Clay (1–1)

Result	W–L	Date	Tournament	Tier	Surface	Opponent	Score
Loss	0–1	Jun 2024	ITF Kamen, Germany	W15	Clay	(Netherlands) Stéphanie Visscher	2–6, 2–6
Win	1–1	Oct 2025	ITF Varna, Bulgaria	W15	Clay	(Serbia) Anastasija Cvetković	7–5, 6–2
Win	2–1	Oct 2025	ITF Essen, Germany	W15	Hard (i)	(Germany) Tessa Johanna Brockmann	1–6, 6–3, 6–1
Win	3–1	Nov 2025	Kyotec Open, Luxembourg	W75	Hard (i)	(Belgium) Jeline Vandromme	6–3, 6–2

=== Doubles: 1 (1 title) ===
Legend
W15 tournaments (1–0)

Result	W–L	Date	Tournament	Tier	Surface	Partner	Opponents	Score
Win	1–0	Oct 2025	ITF Varna, Bulgaria	W15	Clay	(Germany) Laura Böhner	(Spain) Sara Dols (Ukraine) Anastasiya Zaparyniuk	6–4, 6–3

== Junior Grand Slam finals ==
=== Doubles: 1 (1 title) ===
Result	Year	Tournament	Surface	Partner	Opponents	Score
Win	2025	French Open	Clay	(Germany) Sonja Zhenikhova	(Czech Republic) Alena Kovačková (Czech Republic) Jana Kovačková	4–6, 6–4, [10–8]
