= Julia Grabher =

Austrian tennis player (born 1996)

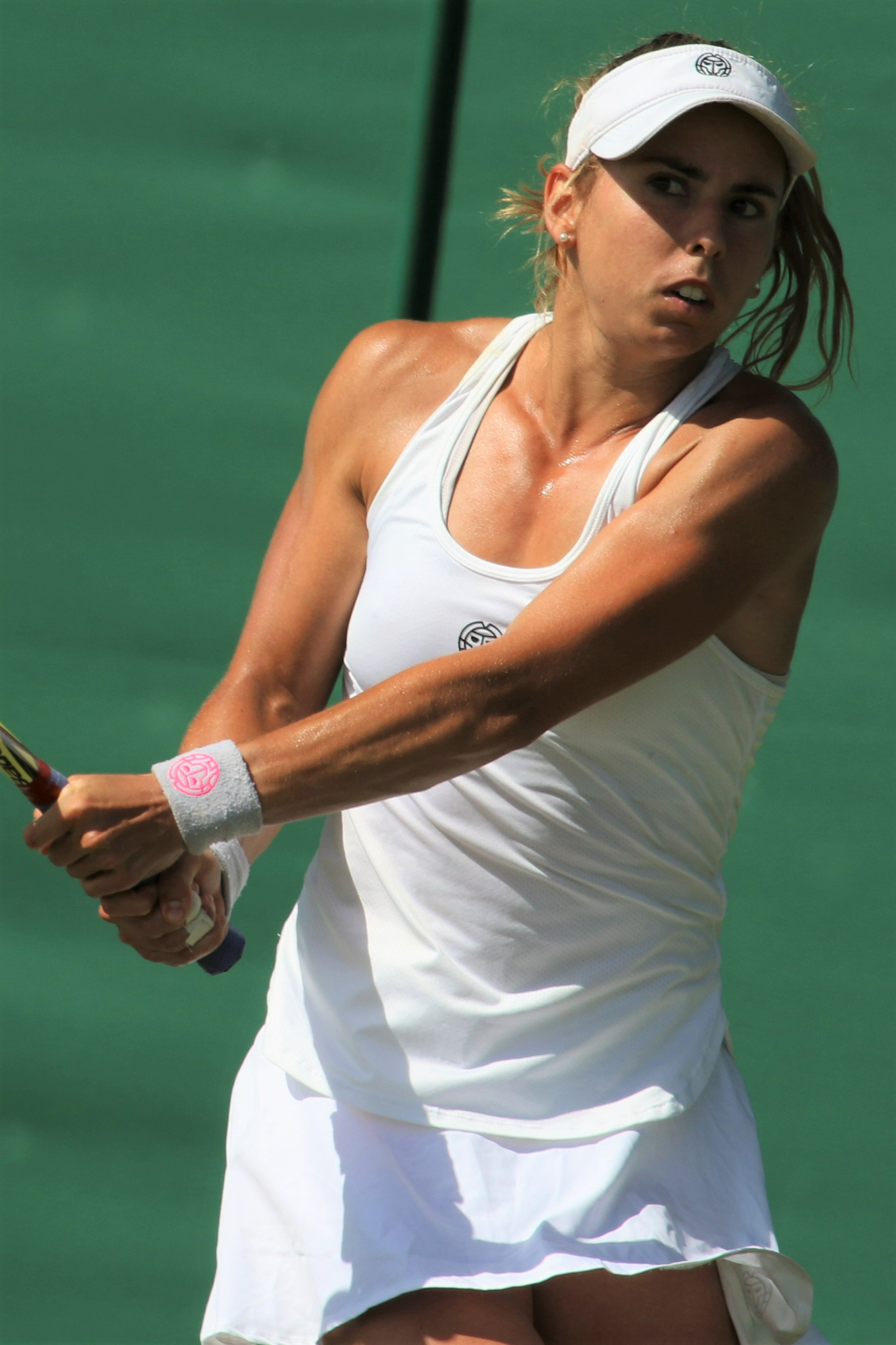
- Grabher at the 2022 Wimbledon Championships
- Country (sports): Austria
- Born: 2 July 1996 (age 30) Dornbirn, Austria
- Height: 1.70 m (5 ft 7 in)
- Coach: Matthew Hair
- Prize money: US$ 1,965,207

Singles
- Career record: 441–284
- Career titles: 3 WTA 125
- Highest ranking: No. 54 (26 June 2023)
- Current ranking: No. 99 (28 September 2026)

Grand Slam singles results
- Australian Open: 2R (2026)
- French Open: 2R (2023, 2026)
- Wimbledon: 1R (2023)
- US Open: 1R (2024, 2026)

Other tournaments
- Olympic Games: 1R (2024)

Doubles
- Career record: 74–52
- Career titles: 8 ITF
- Highest ranking: No. 368 (13 July 2026)
- Current ranking: No. 454 (28 September 2026)

Grand Slam doubles results
- Australian Open: 1R (2025)
- Wimbledon: 1R (2023)

Team competitions
- Fed Cup: 9–26
- Last updated on: 28 September 2026.

Julia Grabher (born 2 July 1996) is an Austrian professional tennis player. On 26 June 2023, she reached her best singles ranking of world No. 54. On 13 July 2026, she peaked at No. 369 in the doubles rankings.

Grabher has won three WTA 125 singles titles, along with 16 singles and eight doubles titles on the ITF Women's Circuit. Playing for the Austria Fed Cup team, Grabher has a win–loss record of 7–16 in singles and 2–10 in doubles (overall 9–26), as of September 2026.

== Career overview ==
=== 2019–22: WTA Tour debut, first WTA 125 title ===
Grabher was given a wildcard for the main draw of the 2019 Ladies Linz but lost in the first round to Slovak player Viktória Kužmová, in straight sets.

In September 2022, she won her first WTA 125 title when she defeated Nuria Brancaccio in the final of the Bari Open, in straight sets. As a result, she reached the top 100, at No. 97 on 12 September 2022. Three weeks later, as the top seed, she would beat Aliona Bolsova and win the final of the $60k Open de San Sebastián, her third ITF Circuit title in 2022.

=== 2023: Maiden WTA Tour final & major debut ===
Grabher made her Grand Slam tournament debut at the Australian Open, losing to 16th seed Anett Kontaveit in the first round.

She then qualified to make her WTA 1000 debut at the Dubai Championships but again lost in the first round, this time to Leylah Fernandez.

At the WTA 500 Charleston Open, Grabher reached the third round, defeating 10th seed Zhang Shuai, her first top-30 win, and qualifier Sachia Vickery, before losing to seventh seed Ekaterina Alexandrova. Entering as a lucky loser at the 2023 Madrid Open, she won her first WTA 1000-level match, defeating another lucky loser, Bulgarian Viktoriya Tomova, but lost in the second round to top seed Iga Świątek. At the Italian Open, she went one step further to reach the third round of a WTA 1000 event for the first time in her career, defeating wildcard Nuria Brancaccio and upsetting 26th seed Jil Teichmann, before losing to eighth seed Daria Kasatkina. As a result, she moved 15 positions up in the rankings, to a new career high of world No. 74, on 22 May.

Grabher reached her maiden WTA Tour final at the Morocco Open in Rabat by a three-set win over Julia Riera in the semifinals. However, she lost the final to Lucia Bronzetti, also in three sets. She won her first match at the French Open defeating Arantxa Rus, before losing to sixth seed Coco Gauff.

In July, Grabher made her main-draw debut at Wimbledon, but lost to Danielle Collins. Seeded fifth at the Hamburg European Open, she reached the second round with a three-set win over Miriam Bulgaru, before losing to Diana Shnaider. In August, Grabher became the first Austrian to win a title at a $100k tournament, at the ITF Maspalomas in Gran Canaria, Spain, defeating Jéssica Bouzas Maneiro in the final and climbing to world No. 54 as a result.

A win over qualifier Wang Xiyu saw her reach the second round at the 2023 Tennis in the Land in Cleveland, where she lost to Zhu Lin. Grabher suffered a wrist injury shortly before the US Open and was forced to end her season early.

=== 2024–25: Comeback from injury, return to top 100 ===
Six months after having surgery on her wrist, Grabher made her comeback to competitive action at the 2024 Antalya Challenger in March 2024, losing in the first round to Noma Noha Akugue in three sets. Using her protected ranking, she entered the 2024 US Open, but lost in the first round to qualifier Elena-Gabriela Ruse.

In October 2025, Grabher won her second WTA 125 title, claiming the trophy at the Florianópolis Open in Brazil, defeating Carole Monnet in the final. As a result, she returned to the top 100, for the first time since November 2023, on 29 October 2025 at world No. 93.

=== 2026: Third WTA 125 title ===
Grabher reached the second round at the Australian Open, where she was eliminated by 31st seed Anna Kalinskaya, and the French Open where she retired due to illness, after losing the first set against sixth seed Amanda Anisimova.

In July, she finished runner-up at the WTA 125 Kitzbühel Ladies Open, losing to fellow Austrian player Sinja Kraus in the final. Two months later, Grabher won her third WTA 125 title at the Tolentino Open, defeating Guiomar Maristany in the final. Having slipped down the WTA rankings, this success saw her move back into the top 100, at world No. 99 on 28 September 2026.

== Performance timeline ==
Key
W	F	SF	QF	#R	RR	Q#	DNQ	A	NH

(W) winner; (F) finalist; (SF) semifinalist; (QF) quarterfinalist; (#R) rounds 4, 3, 2, 1; (RR) round-robin stage; (Q#) qualification round; (DNQ) did not qualify; (A) absent; (NH) not held; (SR) strike rate (events won / competed); (W–L) win–loss record.
To avoid confusion and double counting, these charts are updated at the conclusion of a tournament or when the player's participation has ended.

Only main-draw results in WTA Tour, Grand Slam tournaments, Fed Cup/Billie Jean King Cup, Hopman Cup, United Cup and Olympic Games are included in win–loss records.

=== Singles ===
Current through the 2026 Guadalajara Open.

Tournament	2015	2016	2017	2018	2019	2020	2021	2022	2023	2024	2025	2026	SR	W–L	Win%
Grand Slam tournaments
Australian Open	A	A	A	A	A	Q1	Q1	Q3	1R	A	1R	2R	0 / 3	1–3	25%
French Open	A	A	A	Q2	A	Q2	Q3	Q2	2R	A	A	2R	0 / 2	2–2	50%
Wimbledon	A	A	A	A	A	NH	Q2	Q1	1R	A	Q1	Q1	0 / 1	0–1	0%
US Open	A	A	A	A	Q1	A	Q2	Q1	A	1R	Q1	1R	0 / 2	0–2	0%
Win–loss	0–0	0–0	0–0	0–0	0–0	0–0	0–0	0–0	1–3	0–1	0–1	2–3	0 / 8	3–8	27%
National representation
Billie Jean King Cup (Note: Formerly known as Fed Cup until 2020.)	Z1	POZ2	Z1	Z1	POZ2	Z1 (Note: Edition is split into the two years due to COVID-19.)		PO	QR				0 / 0	6–11	35%
WTA 1000
Dubai / Qatar Open (Note: The first Premier 5 event of the year has switched back and forth between the Dubai Tennis Championships and the Qatar Ladies Open since 2009. Dubai was classified as a Premier 5 event from 2009 to 2011 before being succeeded by Doha for the 2012–2014 period. In 2015, Dubai regained its Premier 5 status while Doha was demoted to Premier status. The Premier 5 tournaments were reclassified as WTA 1000 tournaments in 2021.)	A	A	A	A	A	A	A	A	1R	A	A	Q1	0 / 1	0–1	0%
Indian Wells Open	A	A	A	A	A	NH	A	A	A	A	1R	A	0 / 1	0–1	0%
Miami Open	A	A	A	A	A	NH	A	A	2R	A	2R	A	0 / 2	1–2	33%
Madrid Open	A	A	A	A	A	NH	A	A	2R	A	A	2R	0 / 2	2–2	50%
Italian Open	A	A	A	A	A	A	A	A	3R	A	A	Q2	0 / 1	2–1	67%
Canadian Open	A	A	A	A	A	NH	A	A	A	A	A	A	0 / 0	0–0	–
Cincinnati Open	A	A	A	A	A	A	A	A	A	A	A	Q1	0 / 0	0–0	–
Guadalajara Open	NH							Q1	A	A	A	A	0 / 0	0–0	–
Wuhan Open	A	A	A	A	A	NH				A	A		0 / 0	0–0	–
China Open	A	A	A	A	A	NH			A	A	A		0 / 0	0–0	–
Win–loss	0–0	0–0	0–0	0–0	0–0	0–0	0–0	0–0	3–4	0–0			0 / 4	3–4	43%
Career statistics
	2015	2016	2017	2018	2019	2020	2021	2022	2023	2024	2025	2026	SR	W–L	Win%
Tournaments	0 (Note: During the season, she did not play in the main draw of any tour-level tournaments. However, she played in the Billie Jean King Cup, which is not counted as a played tournament but matches counted.)	0	0	0	1	1	3	2	16	0			Career total: 23		
Titles	0	0	0	0	0	0	0	0	0	0			Career total: 0		
Finals	0	0	0	0	0	0	0	0	1	0			Career total: 1		
Overall win-loss	0–1	0–1	0–1	1–2	1–1	1–3	0–3	6–4	13–18	0–0			0 / 34	22–34	39%
Year–end ranking (Note: 2014: WTA ranking–952.)	572	308	261	247	231	226	192	84	91	523	92		$1,965,207		

== WTA Tour finals ==
=== Singles: 1 (runner-up) ===
Legend WTA 250 (0–1)	Finals by surface Clay (0–1)

Result	W–L	Date	Tournament	Tier	Surface	Opponent	Score
Loss	0–1	May 2023	Rabat Grand Prix, Morocco	WTA 250	Clay	(Italy) Lucia Bronzetti	4–6, 7–5, 5–7

== WTA 125 finals ==
=== Singles: 5 (3 titles, 2 runner-ups) ===
Result	W–L	Date	Tournament	Surface	Opponent	Score
Win	1–0	Sep 2022	Bari Open, Italy	Clay	(Italy) Nuria Brancaccio	6–4, 6–2
Win	2–0	Oct 2025	Florianópolis Open, Brazil	Clay	(France) Carole Monnet	3–6, 6–4, 6–0
Loss	2–1	Jul 2026	Open Ladies Kitzbühel, Austria	Clay	(Austria) Sinja Kraus	3–6, 1–6
Win	3–1	Sep 2026	Tolentino Open, Italy	Clay	(Spain) Guiomar Maristany	7–6^{(7–5)}, 6–2
Loss	3–2	Oct 2026	Curitiba Open, Brazil	Clay	(France) Alice Tubello	6–3, 6–7^{(5–7)}, 6–7^{(2–7)}

== ITF Circuit finals ==
=== Singles: 32 (16 titles, 16 runner-ups) ===
Legend W100 tournaments (1–1) W60/75 tournaments (5–3) W25/35 tournaments (6–5) W10/15 tournaments (4–7)	Finals by surface Hard (1–1) Clay (15–15)

Result	W–L	Date	Tournament	Tier	Surface	Opponent	Score
Loss	0–1	Nov 2014	ITF Heraklion, Greece	10k	Hard	(Hungary) Dalma Gálfi	3–6, 0–6
Win	1–1	Aug 2015	ITF Vienna, Austria	10k	Clay	(Germany) Katharina Gerlach	6–3, 3–6, 6–1
Loss	1–2	Aug 2015	ITF Graz, Austria	10k	Clay	(Austria) Barbara Haas	6–1, 1–6, 2–6
Win	2–2	Aug 2015	ITF Pörtschach, Austria	10k	Clay	(Czech Republic) Marie Bouzková	7–6^{(5)}, 6–1
Loss	2–3	Nov 2015	ITF Casablanca, Morocco	10k	Clay	(Italy) Corinna Dentoni	6–7^{(0)}, 3–6
Win	3–3	Mar 2016	ITF Hammamet, Tunisia	10k	Clay	(Hungary) Vanda Lukács	6–3, 6–3
Loss	3–4	Mar 2016	ITF Hammamet, Tunisia	10k	Clay	(Bulgaria) Isabella Shinikova	4–6, 4–6
Loss	3–5	Apr 2016	ITF Hammamet, Tunisia	10k	Clay	(Romania) Elena Gabriela Ruse	4–6, 1–6
Loss	3–6	Aug 2016	ITF Leipzig, Germany	25k	Clay	(Russia) Olesya Pervushina	6–7^{(4)}, 6–3, 5–7
Loss	3–7	Jan 2017	ITF Hammamet, Tunisia	15k	Clay	(Spain) María Teresa Torró Flor	2–6, 2–6
Win	4–7	Feb 2017	ITF Hammamet, Tunisia	15k	Clay	(Brazil) Laura Pigossi	6–7^{(5)}, 6–2, 6–2
Loss	4–8	Mar 2017	ITF Antalya, Turkey	15k	Clay	(Serbia) Olga Danilović	3–6, 2–6
Win	5–8	May 2017	ITF Rome, Italy	25k	Clay	(Croatia) Tereza Mrdeža	7–5, 6–0
Loss	5–9	Oct 2017	ITF Santa Margherita di Pula, Italy	25k	Clay	(Italy) Jessica Pieri	4–6, 1–6
Loss	5–10	Jan 2018	ITF Orlando, United States	25k	Clay	(Ukraine) Anhelina Kalinina	2–6, 6–3, 5–7
Win	6–10	Mar 2018	ITF São Paulo, Brazil	25k	Clay	(Slovenia) Tamara Zidanšek	6–4, 3–6, 6–2
Loss	6–11	Aug 2018	ITF Leipzig, Germany	25k	Clay	(Russia) Varvara Flink	3–6, 2–6
Loss	6–12	Mar 2019	ITF Campinas, Brazil	W25	Clay	(Montenegro) Danka Kovinić	2–6, 6–3, 3–6
Win	7–12	Jun 2019	ITF Klosters, Switzerland	W25	Clay	(Brazil) Nathaly Kurata	6–1, 6–3
Loss	7–13	Sep 2019	Montreux Ladies Open, Switzerland	W60	Clay	(Serbia) Olga Danilović	2–6, 3–6
Win	8–13	Apr 2021	Bellinzona Ladies Open, Switzerland	W60	Clay	(Italy) Lucia Bronzetti	6–2, 6–3
Win	9–13	Feb 2022	Porto Indoor, Portugal	W25	Hard (i)	(Poland) Maja Chwalińska	6–3, 6–7^{(2)}, 7–5
Win	10–13	Aug 2022	ITF Maspalomas, Spain	W60	Clay	(Argentina) Nadia Podoroska	6–4, 6–3
Win	11–13	Oct 2022	Open de San Sebastián, Spain	W60	Clay	(Spain) Aliona Bolsova	6–3, 7–6^{(3)}
Win	12–13	Aug 2023	ITF Maspalomas, Spain	W100	Clay	(Spain) Jéssica Bouzas Maneiro	6–4, 6–4
Win	13–13	Sep 2024	ITF Santa Margherita di Pula, Italy	W35	Clay	(Switzerland) Leonie Küng	3–6, 6–0, 6–2
Win	14–13	Mar 2025	ITF Santa Margherita di Pula, Italy	W35	Clay	(Italy) Jessica Pieri	7–5, 6–0
Win	15–13	Apr 2025	Koper Open, Slovenia	W75	Clay	(Georgia (country)) Ekaterine Gorgodze	6–2, 6–2
Win	16–13	Apr 2025	Chiasso Open, Switzerland	W75	Clay	(Ukraine) Katarina Zavatska	6–2, 6–1
Loss	16–14	Apr 2025	Wiesbaden Open, Germany	W100	Clay	(Hungary) Anna Bondár	2–6, 4–6
Loss	16–15	May 2025	Internazionali di Brescia, Italy	W75	Clay	(Slovenia) Kaja Juvan	6–7^{(1)}, 5–7
Loss	16–16	Jul 2025	Ladies Open Hechingen, Germany	W75	Clay	(Czech Republic) Nikola Bartůňková	5–7, 2–6

=== Doubles: 13 (8 titles, 5 runner-ups) ===
Legend W25/35 tournaments (1–3) W10/15 tournaments (7–2)	Finals by surface Hard (0–1) Clay (8–4)

Result	W–L	Date	Tournament	Tier	Surface	Partner	Opponents	Score
Win	1–0	Aug 2015	ITF Pörtschach, Austria	10k	Clay	(Austria) Mira Antonitsch	(Croatia) Iva Primorac (Austria) Janina Toljan	6–2, 6–1
Win	2–0	Dec 2015	ITF Cairo, Egypt	10k	Clay	(Romania) Ana Bianca Mihăilă	(Russia) Anna Morgina (Poland) Patrycja Polańska	6–2, 6–4
Loss	2–1	Jan 2016	ITF Antalya, Turkey	10k	Clay	(Czech Republic) Anna Slováková	(Slovenia) Nastja Kolar (Bosnia and Herzegovina) Jasmina Tinjić	6–7^{(5)}, 6–3, [6–10]
Win	3–1	Jan 2016	ITF Antalya, Turkey	10k	Clay	(Hungary) Ágnes Bukta	(Georgia (country)) Ekaterine Gorgodze (Georgia (country)) Sofia Kvatsabaia	1–6, 6–4, [11–9]
Win	4–1	Feb 2016	ITF Antalya, Turkey	10k	Clay	(Hungary) Ágnes Bukta	(Romania) Daiana Negreanu (India) Kyra Shroff	6–3, 6–4
Win	5–1	Mar 2016	ITF Hammamet, Tunisia	10k	Clay	(Bulgaria) Isabella Shinikova	(Russia) Yuliya Kalabina (Russia) Polina Monova	7–5, 6–0
Win	6–1	Mar 2016	ITF Hammamet, Tunisia	10k	Clay	(Hungary) Naomi Totka	(North Macedonia) Lina Gjorcheska (Bulgaria) Isabella Shinikova	7–5, 1–6, [13–11]
Win	7–1	Mar 2016	ITF Hammamet, Tunisia	10k	Clay	(Australia) Isabelle Wallace	(Italy) Claudia Giovine (India) Snehadevi Reddy	6–1, 6–3
Loss	7–2	Jan 2017	ITF Hammamet, Tunisia	15k	Clay	(France) Joséphine Boualem	(France) Chloé Paquet (Spain) María Teresa Torró Flor	4–6, 4–6
Loss	7–3	Sep 2017	ITF Bagnatica, Italy	25k	Clay	(Norway) Melanie Stokke	(Italy) Deborah Chiesa (Italy) Martina Colmegna	3–6, 6–4, [6–10]
Win	8–3	May 2019	ITF Caserta, Italy	W25	Clay	(Australia) Lizette Cabrera	(Romania) Elena Bogdan (Slovakia) Vivien Juhaszová	6–3, 6–4
Loss	8–4	Sep 2024	ITF Reus, Spain	W35	Clay	(Germany) Caroline Werner	(Switzerland) Ylena In-Albon (Mexico) María Portillo Ramírez	4–6, 3–6
Loss	8–5	Dec 2024	ITF Tauranga, New Zealand	W35	Hard	(New Zealand) Elyse Tse	(Japan) Hiromi Abe (Japan) Shiho Akita	2–6, 2–6
