= Enola Chiesa =

Italian tennis player (born 2000)

- Country (sports): Italy
- Born: 16 July 2000 (age 26) Valenza, Italy
- Plays: Right (two-handed backhand)
- Prize money: $74,399

Singles
- Career record: 213–187
- Career titles: 1 ITF
- Highest ranking: No. 535 (26 October 2026)
- Current ranking: No. 555 (9 November 2026)

Doubles
- Career record: 129–134
- Career titles: 7 ITF
- Highest ranking: No. 212 (2 November 2026)
- Current ranking: No. 214 (9 November 2026)
- Last updated on: 10 November 2026.

Enola Chiesa (born July 16, 2000) is an Italian tennis player. She has a career-high doubles ranking by the WTA of No. 212, achieved on 2 November 2026.

== Early life ==
Born in Valenza, Chiesa began playing tennis at the age of seven. She trained under Graziano Gavazzi. Her tennis idol is Rafael Nadal.

== Career ==
In August 2023, she and compatriot Samira De Stefano has lost the women's doubles final at the World Tennis Tour in Wanfercée-Baulet. Defeated German Selina Dal and Dutch Stephanie Judith Visscher.

In September 2023, she reached the singles final at the W15 event held in Fiano Romano, Italy. In doubles, she won the first title in her career. A few weeks later, she was forced to retire from the match, after suffering an injury during the final of a W15 event in Kuršumlijska Banja, Serbia.

In November 2023, she and fellow Italian Alessandra Mazzola lost the women's doubles final of the ITF event in Valencia to Spanish player Martina Genis Salas and French Tiantsoa Rakotomanga Rajaonah.

In September and November 2024, she won the doubles titles at the W15 events held in Nogent-sur-Marne, France, and Nules, Spain, respectively.

In April 2026, she and Beatrise Zeltiņa from Latvia won the doubles final in Santa Margherita di Pula, defeating Italian pairing of Tyra Caterina Grant and Jennifer Ruggeri.

In August 2026, she and Slovenian Dalila Jakupović defeated Sapfo Sakellaridi and Aurora Zantedeschi in the doubles final of the W75 Ladies Open Hechingen. This championship was her first major title.

== ITF Circuit finals ==
=== Singles: 5 (1 title, 4 runner-ups) ===
Legend
W15 tournaments

Result	W-L	Date	Tournament	Tier	Surface	Opponent	Score
Loss	0–1	Aug 2022	ITF Norrköping, Sweden	W15	Clay	(Finland) Laura Hietaranta	0–6, 0–6
Loss	0–2	Sep 2023	ITF Fiano Romano, Italy	W15	Clay	Alexandra Shubladze	7–6^{(5)}, 2–6, 1–6
Loss	0–3	Sep 2023	ITF Kursumlijska Banja, Serbia	W15	Clay	(Germany) Mara Guth	4–6, 0–2 ret.
Loss	0–4	Nov 2025	ITF Lousada, Portugal	W15	Hard	(Sweden) Linea Bajraliu	6–7^{(1)}, 4–6
Win	1–4	Aug 2026	ITF Pécs, Hungary	W15	Clay	(Slovakia) Karolína Mráziková	4–6, 6–3, 6–4

=== Doubles: 17 (7 titles, 10 runner-ups) ===
Legend
W75 tournaments
W50 tournaments
W35 tournaments
W15 tournaments

Result	W–L	Date	Tournament	Tier	Surface	Partner	Opponents	Score
Loss	0–1	Mar 2019	ITF Antalya, Turkey	W15	Clay	(Italy) Valentina Losciale	(Ukraine) Viktoriia Dema (Serbia) Elena Milovanović	4–6, 3–6
Loss	0–2	Aug 2022	ITF Padova, Italy	W15	Clay	(Italy) Jessica Bertoldo	(Italy) Virginia Ferrara (Italy) Giorgia Pedone	3–6, 4–6
Loss	0–3	Aug 2023	ITF Wanfercée-Baulet, Belgium	W15	Clay	(Italy) Samira De Stefano	(Germany) Selina Dal (Netherlands) Stéphanie Visscher	1–6, 2–6
Win	1–3	Sep 2023	ITF Fiano Romano, Italy	W15	Clay	(Italy) Samira De Stefano	(Switzerland) Lara Michel (Italy) Gaia Sanesi	6–1, 6–4
Loss	1–4	Dec 2023	ITF Valencia, Spain	W15	Clay	(Italy) Alessandra Mazzola	(Spain) Martina Genis Salas (France) Tiantsoa Rakotomanga Rajaonah	6–2, 2–6, [8–10]
Win	2–4	Sep 2024	ITF Nogent-sur-Marne, France	W15	Clay	(Italy) Federica Urgesi	(Germany) Laura Böhner (Germany) Chantal Sauvant	6–1, 7–6^{(3)}
Win	3–4	Nov 2024	ITF Nules, Spain	W15	Clay	(Australia) Seone Mendez	(Spain) Lorena Solar Donoso (Spain) Meritxell Teixidó García	6–2, 3–6, [10–4]
Loss	3–5	May 2025	ITF Vall de Uxó, Spain	W15	Clay	(France) Marine Szostak	(Poland) Anna Hertel (Hungary) Adrienn Nagy	4–6, 1–6
Loss	3–6	Jun 2025	ITF Osijek, Croatia	W15	Clay	(Croatia) Linda Ševčíková	(Slovakia) Nikola Daubnerová; Anna Zyryanova	6–7^{(3)}, 6–3, [4–10]
Loss	3–7	Sep 2025	ITF Câmpulung, Romania	W15	Clay	(Belgium) Tilwith Di Girolami	(Romania) Alesia Breaz (Romania) Cristiana Nicoleta Todoni	2–6, 5–7
Loss	3–8	Oct 2025	ITF Villena, Spain	W15	Hard	(Spain) Celia Cerviño Ruiz	(Germany) Elena Giovanna Giessler (Spain) Maria Oliver Sanchez	4–6, 3–6
Loss	3–9	Nov 2025	ITF Nules, Spain	W15	Clay	(Italy) Laura Mair	(Spain) Noelia Bouzo Zanotti (Germany) Joëlle Steur	0–6, 2–6
Loss	3–10	Feb 2026	ITF Mâcon, France	W50	Hard (i)	(France) Jenny Lim	(Chinese Taipei) Li Yu-yun (China) Li Zongyu	3–6, 7–5, [7–10]
Win	4–10	Mar 2026	ITF Le Havre, France	W15	Clay (i)	(Italy) Camilla Gennaro	(France) Océane Babel (Czech Republic) Amelie Justine Hejtmanek	7–6^{(5)}, 6–4
Win	5–10	Mar 2026	ITF Santa Margherita di Pula, Italy	W35	Clay	(Latvia) Beatrise Zeltiņa	(Italy) Tyra Caterina Grant (Italy) Jennifer Ruggeri	6–4, 6–7^{(3)}, [10–7]
Win	6–10	Apr 2026	ITF Santa Margherita di Pula	W35	Clay	(Germany) Joëlle Steur	(Finland) Laura Hietaranta (Italy) Tiphanie Lemaître	6–1, 6–3
Win	7–10	Jul 2026	Ladies Open Hechingen, Germany	W75	Clay	(Slovenia) Dalila Jakupović	(Greece) Sapfo Sakellaridi (Italy) Aurora Zantedeschi	6–3, 2–6, [12–10]
