= Samira De Stefano =

Italian tennis player (born 2004)

Samira de Stefano
- Country (sports): Italy
- Born: 6 May 2004 (age 22) Varese, Italy
- Turned pro: 2021
- Plays: Left-handed (two-handed backhand)
- Prize money: $94,827

Singles
- Career record: 152–104
- Career titles: 1 WTA 125
- Highest ranking: No. 188 (19 October 2026)
- Current ranking: No. 188 (19 October 2026)

Doubles
- Career record: 67–66
- Career titles: 3 ITF
- Highest ranking: No. 329 (31 August 2026)
- Current ranking: No. 372 (14 September 2026)
- Last updated on: 19 October 2026.

Samira De Stefano (born 6 May 2004) is an Italian professional tennis player. She has a career-high WTA rankings ranking of world No. 188 in single.

== Tennis career ==
De Stefano was born in Varese, Italy. She won her first ITF title at Viserba in 2024. In 2025, she won a W35 tournament in Solarino. In 2026, she won tournaments in Monastir and Santa Margherita di Pula. She also reached the semifinals of the ITF tournament in Chiasso in 2026.

In August 2026, she has won the women's singles final at the World Tennis Tour in W50 event in Kuršumlijska Banja defeating Serbian player Anja Stanković. This championship is her first major ITF title.

De Stefano won her first WTA 125 singles title at the Ljubljana Open in September 2026, defeating Mona Barthel in the final.

== WTA 125 finals ==
=== Singles: 1 (1 title) ===
Result	W–L	Date	Tournament	Surface	Opponent	Score
Win	1–0	Sep 2026	Ljubljana Open, Slovenia	Clay	(Germany) Mona Barthel	3–6, 6–1, 7–5

== ITF Circuit finals ==
=== Singles: 9 (5 titles, 4 runner-ups) ===
Legend W50 tournaments (1–1) W35 tournaments (2–1) W15 tournaments (2–2)	Finals by surface Clay (3–2) Hard (1–2) Carpet (1–0)

Result	W–L	Date	Tournament	Tier	Surface	Opponent	Score
Loss	0–1	Sep 2022	ITF Monastir, Tunisia	W15	Hard	(China) Bai Zhuoxuan	2–6, 4–6
Win	1–1	Jul 2024	ITF Viserba, Italy	W15	Clay	(Algeria) Inès Ibbou	7–5, 6–3
Loss	1–2	Sep 2024	ITF Fiano Romano, Italy	W15	Clay	(Italy) Verena Meliss	4–6, 7–6^{(2)}, 4–6
Win	2–2	Mar 2025	ITF Solarino, Italy	W35	Carpet	(Japan) Hiromi Abe	6–3, 6–3
Loss	2–3	Aug 2025	ITF Trieste, Italy	W35	Clay	(Italy) Jennifer Ruggeri	4–6, 6–2, 4–6
Win	3–3	Jan 2026	ITF Monastir, Tunisia	W15	Hard	Kristina Dmitruk	6–4, 6–4
Loss	3–4	Jan 2026	ITF Monastir, Tunisia	W50	Hard	Anastasia Gasanova	5–7, 6–2, 3–6
Win	4–4	Apr 2026	ITF Santa Margherita di Pula, Italy	W35	Clay	(Germany) Joëlle Steur	6–0, 6–2
Win	5–4	Aug 2026	ITF Kuršumlijska Banja, Serbia	W50	Clay	(Serbia) Anja Stanković	6–0, 6–1

=== Doubles: 7 (3 titles, 4 runner-ups) ===
Legend W50 tournaments (0–1) W35 tournaments (1–0) W15 tournaments (2–3)	Finals by surface Clay (2–2) Hard (0–2) Carpet (1–0)

Result	W–L	Date	Tournament	Tier	Surface	Partner	Opponents	Score
Win	1–0	Nov 2022	ITF Solarino, Italy	W15	Carpet	(Italy) Camilla Gennaro	(Switzerland) Nicole Gadient (Czech Republic) Ivana Šebestová	7–5, 4–6, [10–8]
Loss	1–1	Jul 2023	ITF Monastir, Tunisia	W15	Hard	(Italy) Gaia Parravicini	(France) Beverley Nyangon (Kenya) Angella Okutoyi	4–6, 6–3, [2–10]
Loss	1–2	Aug 2023	ITF Wanfercée-Baulet, Belgium	W15	Clay	(Italy) Enola Chiesa	(Germany) Selina Dal (Netherlands) Stéphanie Visscher	1–6, 2–6
Win	2–2	Sep 2023	ITF Fiano Romano, Italy	W15	Clay	(Italy) Enola Chiesa	(Switzerland) Lara Michel (Italy) Gaia Sanesi	6–1, 6–4
Loss	2–3	Sep 2024	ITF Fiano Romano, Italy	W15	Clay	(Italy) Camilla Gennaro	(Italy) Federica Sacco (Italy) Beatrice Stagno	6–7^{(5)}, 7–6^{(3)}, [7–10]
Win	3–3	Aug 2025	ITF Trieste, Italy	W35	Clay	(Italy) Alessandra Mazzola	(Italy) Aurora Corvi (Italy) Jennifer Ruggeri	6–3, 6–0
Loss	3–4	Nov 2025	ITF Ortisei, Italy	W50	Hard (i)	(Italy) Gaia Maduzzi	(Canada) Kayla Cross (United States) Anna Rogers	6–7^{(4)}, 6–7^{(7)}
