= 2025 WTA 125 Circuit =

Secondary women's tennis tournaments

2025 WTA 125 tournaments
Details
- Duration: 30 December 2024 – 14 December 2025
- Edition: 14th
- Tournaments: 53

Achievements (singles)
- Most titles: (Czech Republic) Sára Bejlek (Ukraine) Oleksandra Oliynykova (3)
- Most finals: (Czech Republic) Sára Bejlek (Hungary) Dalma Gálfi (Slovenia) Kaja Juvan (Ukraine) Oleksandra Oliynykova; Oksana Selekhmeteva (Hungary) Panna Udvardy (3)

The WTA 125 tournaments were the secondary professional tennis circuit tournaments organised by the Women's Tennis Association. The 2025 calendar consisted of fifty three tournaments announced or confirmed through various sources.

== Schedule ==
=== January ===
Week of	Tournament	Champions	Runners-up	Semifinalists	Quarterfinalists
December 30	Workday Canberra International; Canberra, Australia; Hard – $200,000 – 32S/32Q/16D; Singles – Doubles	(Japan) Aoi Ito; 6–4, 6–3	(China) Wei Sijia	(Spain) Nuria Párrizas Díaz (Philippines) Alexandra Eala	Oksana Selekhmeteva (Serbia) Nina Stojanović (Switzerland) Simona Waltert (Australia) Taylah Preston
December 30	Workday Canberra International; Canberra, Australia; Hard – $200,000 – 32S/32Q/16D; Singles – Doubles	(Australia) Jaimee Fourlis (Australia) Petra Hule; 7–5, 4–6, [10–6]	(Latvia) Darja Semeņistaja (Serbia) Nina Stojanović	(Spain) Nuria Párrizas Díaz (Philippines) Alexandra Eala	Oksana Selekhmeteva (Serbia) Nina Stojanović (Switzerland) Simona Waltert (Australia) Taylah Preston

=== February ===
Week of	Tournament	Champions	Runners-up	Semifinalists	Quarterfinalists
February 3	L&T Mumbai Open; Mumbai, India; Hard – $115,000 – 32S/16Q/16D; Singles – Doubles	(Switzerland) Jil Teichmann; 6–3, 6–4	(Thailand) Mananchaya Sawangkaew	(India) Maaya Rajeshwaran (Canada) Rebecca Marino	(India) Shrivalli Bhamidipaty (Japan) Mei Yamaguchi (Thailand) Lanlana Tararudee (Japan) Mai Hontama
February 3	L&T Mumbai Open; Mumbai, India; Hard – $115,000 – 32S/16Q/16D; Singles – Doubles	Amina Anshba; Elena Pridankina; 7–6^{(7–4)}, 2–6, [10–7]	(Netherlands) Arianne Hartono (India) Prarthana Thombare	(India) Maaya Rajeshwaran (Canada) Rebecca Marino	(India) Shrivalli Bhamidipaty (Japan) Mei Yamaguchi (Thailand) Lanlana Tararudee (Japan) Mai Hontama
February 10	Cancún Tennis Open; Cancún, Mexico; Hard – $115,000 – 32S/8Q/16D; Singles – Doubles	(Colombia) Emiliana Arango; 6–2, 6–1	(Canada) Carson Branstine	(United Kingdom) Francesca Jones (Australia) Maya Joint	Iryna Shymanovich (France) Séléna Janicijevic (Argentina) Solana Sierra (Poland) Katarzyna Kawa
February 10	Cancún Tennis Open; Cancún, Mexico; Hard – $115,000 – 32S/8Q/16D; Singles – Doubles	(Australia) Maya Joint (Australia) Taylah Preston; 6–4, 6–3	(Spain) Aliona Bolsova (Spain) Yvonne Cavallé Reimers	(United Kingdom) Francesca Jones (Australia) Maya Joint	Iryna Shymanovich (France) Séléna Janicijevic (Argentina) Solana Sierra (Poland) Katarzyna Kawa

=== March ===
Week of	Tournament	Champions	Runners-up	Semifinalists	Quarterfinalists
March 17	Megasaray Hotels Open 1 Antalya, Turkey; Clay – $115,000 – 32S/16Q/16D; Singles – Doubles	(Romania) Anca Todoni; 6–3, 6–2	(Spain) Leyre Romero Gormaz	(France) Clara Burel (Poland) Maja Chwalińska	(France) Chloé Paquet (Netherlands) Arantxa Rus (Andorra) Victoria Jiménez Kasintseva (France) Elsa Jacquemot
March 17	Megasaray Hotels Open 1 Antalya, Turkey; Clay – $115,000 – 32S/16Q/16D; Singles – Doubles	(Poland) Maja Chwalińska (Czech Republic) Anastasia Dețiuc; 4–6, 6–3, [10–2]	(Czech Republic) Jesika Malečková (Czech Republic) Miriam Škoch	(France) Clara Burel (Poland) Maja Chwalińska	(France) Chloé Paquet (Netherlands) Arantxa Rus (Andorra) Victoria Jiménez Kasintseva (France) Elsa Jacquemot
March 24	Puerto Vallarta Open; Puerto Vallarta, Mexico; Hard – $115,000 – 32S/4Q/8D; Singles – Doubles	(Romania) Jaqueline Cristian; 7–5, 6–4	(Czech Republic) Linda Fruhvirtová	(Switzerland) Rebeka Masarova (United Kingdom) Heather Watson	(Germany) Tatjana Maria (Australia) Maddison Inglis (Canada) Marina Stakusic (Australia) Maya Joint
March 24	Puerto Vallarta Open; Puerto Vallarta, Mexico; Hard – $115,000 – 32S/4Q/8D; Singles – Doubles	(United States) Hanna Chang (United States) Christina McHale; 2–6, 6–2, [10–7]	(Australia) Maya Joint (Japan) Ena Shibahara	(Switzerland) Rebeka Masarova (United Kingdom) Heather Watson	(Germany) Tatjana Maria (Australia) Maddison Inglis (Canada) Marina Stakusic (Australia) Maya Joint
March 24	Megasaray Hotels Open 2 Antalya, Turkey; Clay – $115,000 – 32S/16Q/16D; Singles – Doubles	(Serbia) Olga Danilović; 6–2, 6–3	(Andorra) Victoria Jiménez Kasintseva	Oksana Selekhmeteva (Slovenia) Veronika Erjavec	(Switzerland) Simona Waltert (Slovenia) Tamara Zidanšek (Argentina) María Lourdes Carlé (Spain) Jéssica Bouzas Maneiro
March 24	Megasaray Hotels Open 2 Antalya, Turkey; Clay – $115,000 – 32S/16Q/16D; Singles – Doubles	(Argentina) María Lourdes Carlé (Switzerland) Simona Waltert; 3–6, 7–5, [10–3]	(Poland) Maja Chwalińska (Czech Republic) Anastasia Dețiuc	Oksana Selekhmeteva (Slovenia) Veronika Erjavec	(Switzerland) Simona Waltert (Slovenia) Tamara Zidanšek (Argentina) María Lourdes Carlé (Spain) Jéssica Bouzas Maneiro
March 31	Open Internacional Femení Solgironès; La Bisbal d'Empordà, Spain; Clay – $115,000 – 32S/8Q/8D; Singles – Doubles	(Latvia) Darja Semeņistaja; 5–7, 6–0, 6–4	(Hungary) Dalma Gálfi	(Hungary) Panna Udvardy (Spain) Aliona Bolsova	(Germany) Eva Lys (France) Alizé Cornet (Spain) Guiomar Maristany (Germany) Caroline Werner
March 31	Open Internacional Femení Solgironès; La Bisbal d'Empordà, Spain; Clay – $115,000 – 32S/8Q/8D; Singles – Doubles	(Belgium) Magali Kempen (Czech Republic) Anna Sisková; 7–6^{(7–1)}, 6–1	(Latvia) Darja Semeņistaja (Serbia) Nina Stojanović	(Hungary) Panna Udvardy (Spain) Aliona Bolsova	(Germany) Eva Lys (France) Alizé Cornet (Spain) Guiomar Maristany (Germany) Caroline Werner
March 31	Megasaray Hotels Open 3 Antalya, Turkey; Clay – $115,000 – 32S/16Q/16D; Singles – Doubles	(Argentina) Solana Sierra; 6–3, 6–4	(Spain) Leyre Romero Gormaz	(Australia) Astra Sharma (Croatia) Tara Würth	(Hungary) Anna Bondár (Bulgaria) Lia Karatancheva (China) Zheng Wushuang (Switzerland) Simona Waltert
March 31	Megasaray Hotels Open 3 Antalya, Turkey; Clay – $115,000 – 32S/16Q/16D; Singles – Doubles	(Hungary) Anna Bondár (Switzerland) Simona Waltert; 7–5, 2–6, [10–6]	(United Kingdom) Alicia Barnett (France) Elixane Lechemia	(Australia) Astra Sharma (Croatia) Tara Würth	(Hungary) Anna Bondár (Bulgaria) Lia Karatancheva (China) Zheng Wushuang (Switzerland) Simona Waltert

=== April ===
Week of	Tournament	Champions	Runners-up	Semifinalists	Quarterfinalists
April 14	Oeiras Ladies Open; Oeiras, Portugal; Clay – €173,913 – 32S/16Q/16D; Singles – Doubles	(Hungary) Dalma Gálfi; 4–6, 6–1, 6–2	(United States) Katie Volynets	(United States) Varvara Lepchenko (Switzerland) Simona Waltert	(Hungary) Panna Udvardy; Elena Pridankina (Serbia) Nina Stojanović (Andorra) Victoria Jiménez Kasintseva
April 14	Oeiras Ladies Open; Oeiras, Portugal; Clay – €173,913 – 32S/16Q/16D; Singles – Doubles	(Portugal) Francisca Jorge (Portugal) Matilde Jorge; 6–1, 6–2	(Czech Republic) Anastasia Dețiuc (Romania) Patricia Maria Țig	(United States) Varvara Lepchenko (Switzerland) Simona Waltert	(Hungary) Panna Udvardy; Elena Pridankina (Serbia) Nina Stojanović (Andorra) Victoria Jiménez Kasintseva
April 28	L'Open 35 de Saint-Malo; Saint-Malo, France; Clay – €100,000 – 32S/16Q/16D; Singles – Doubles	(Japan) Naomi Osaka; 6–1, 7–5	(Slovenia) Kaja Juvan	(Switzerland) Viktorija Golubic (France) Léolia Jeanjean	(United States) McCartney Kessler (United States) Katie Volynets (France) Fiona Ferro (France) Elsa Jacquemot
April 28	L'Open 35 de Saint-Malo; Saint-Malo, France; Clay – €100,000 – 32S/16Q/16D; Singles – Doubles	(United Kingdom) Maia Lumsden (Japan) Makoto Ninomiya; 7–5, 6–2	(Georgia (country)) Oksana Kalashnikova (Italy) Angelica Moratelli	(Switzerland) Viktorija Golubic (France) Léolia Jeanjean	(United States) McCartney Kessler (United States) Katie Volynets (France) Fiona Ferro (France) Elsa Jacquemot
April 28	Catalonia Open WTA 125; Vic, Spain; Clay – €100,000 – 32S/7Q/8D; Singles – Doubles	(Hungary) Dalma Gálfi; 6–3, 6–0	(Switzerland) Rebeka Masarova	Aliaksandra Sasnovich; Oksana Selekhmeteva	(Spain) Carlota Martínez Círez (Czech Republic) Kateřina Siniaková (Spain) Guiomar Maristany (Spain) Aliona Bolsova
April 28	Catalonia Open WTA 125; Vic, Spain; Clay – €100,000 – 32S/7Q/8D; Singles – Doubles	(Canada) Bianca Andreescu (Indonesia) Aldila Sutjiadi; 6–2, 6–4	(Canada) Leylah Fernandez (New Zealand) Lulu Sun	Aliaksandra Sasnovich; Oksana Selekhmeteva	(Spain) Carlota Martínez Círez (Czech Republic) Kateřina Siniaková (Spain) Guiomar Maristany (Spain) Aliona Bolsova

=== May ===
Week of	Tournament	Champions	Runners-up	Semifinalists	Quarterfinalists
May 12	Parma Ladies Open; Parma, Italy; Clay – €100,000 – 32S/8Q/16D; Singles – Doubles	(Egypt) Mayar Sherif; 6–4, 6–4	(Canada) Victoria Mboko	(Switzerland) Simona Waltert (Romania) Irina-Camelia Begu	(Kazakhstan) Yulia Putintseva (Canada) Marina Stakusic (Hungary) Anna Bondár (China) Wang Xinyu
May 12	Parma Ladies Open; Parma, Italy; Clay – €100,000 – 32S/8Q/16D; Singles – Doubles	(Czech Republic) Jesika Malečková (Czech Republic) Miriam Škoch; 6–2, 6–0	(United States) Sabrina Santamaria (China) Tang Qianhui	(Switzerland) Simona Waltert (Romania) Irina-Camelia Begu	(Kazakhstan) Yulia Putintseva (Canada) Marina Stakusic (Hungary) Anna Bondár (China) Wang Xinyu
May 12	Trophée Clarins; Paris, France; Clay – €100,000 – 32S/8Q/8D; Singles – Doubles	(United Kingdom) Katie Boulter; 3–6, 6–2, 6–3	(France) Chloé Paquet	Aliaksandra Sasnovich (France) Varvara Gracheva	(United States) Amanda Anisimova (France) Julie Belgraver; Kamilla Rakhimova (France) Elsa Jacquemot
May 12	Trophée Clarins; Paris, France; Clay – €100,000 – 32S/8Q/8D; Singles – Doubles	Irina Khromacheva (Hungary) Fanny Stollár; 4–6, 7–6^{(7–5)}, [10–5]	(Slovakia) Tereza Mihalíková (United Kingdom) Olivia Nicholls	Aliaksandra Sasnovich (France) Varvara Gracheva	(United States) Amanda Anisimova (France) Julie Belgraver; Kamilla Rakhimova (France) Elsa Jacquemot

=== June ===
Week of	Tournament	Champions	Runners-up	Semifinalists	Quarterfinalists
June 2	Lexus Birmingham Open; Birmingham, United Kingdom; Grass – $200,000 – 32S/24Q/16D; Singles – Doubles	(Belgium) Greet Minnen; 6–2, 6–1	(Czech Republic) Linda Fruhvirtová	(France) Jessika Ponchet (Switzerland) Rebeka Masarova	(United Kingdom) Mingge Xu (Italy) Lucrezia Stefanini (United States) Robin Montgomery (Australia) Kimberly Birrell
June 2	Lexus Birmingham Open; Birmingham, United Kingdom; Grass – $200,000 – 32S/24Q/16D; Singles – Doubles	(Australia) Destanee Aiava (Spain) Cristina Bucșa; 6–4, 6–2	(United Kingdom) Alicia Barnett (France) Elixane Lechemia	(France) Jessika Ponchet (Switzerland) Rebeka Masarova	(United Kingdom) Mingge Xu (Italy) Lucrezia Stefanini (United States) Robin Montgomery (Australia) Kimberly Birrell
June 2	Open delle Puglie; Bari, Italy; Clay – €100,000 – 32S/8Q/8D; Singles – Doubles	(Romania) Anca Todoni; 6–7^{(4–7)}, 6–4, 6–4	(Hungary) Anna Bondár	(Liechtenstein) Kathinka von Deichmann (Spain) Nuria Párrizas Díaz	(Romania) Ana Bogdan (Switzerland) Jil Teichmann; Iryna Shymanovich (Bulgaria) Viktoriya Tomova
June 2	Open delle Puglie; Bari, Italy; Clay – €100,000 – 32S/8Q/8D; Singles – Doubles	Maria Kozyreva; Iryna Shymanovich; 3–6, 6–4, [10–7]	(United States) Quinn Gleason (Brazil) Ingrid Martins	(Liechtenstein) Kathinka von Deichmann (Spain) Nuria Párrizas Díaz	(Romania) Ana Bogdan (Switzerland) Jil Teichmann; Iryna Shymanovich (Bulgaria) Viktoriya Tomova
June 2	Makarska Open; Makarska, Croatia; Clay – $115,000 – 32S/8Q/8D; Singles – Doubles	(Czech Republic) Sára Bejlek; 6–0, 6–1	(Andorra) Victoria Jiménez Kasintseva	(Australia) Maya Joint (Serbia) Lola Radivojević	(Latvia) Darja Semeņistaja (Egypt) Mayar Sherif (Croatia) Petra Marčinko (Germany) Mona Barthel
June 2	Makarska Open; Makarska, Croatia; Clay – $115,000 – 32S/8Q/8D; Singles – Doubles	(Czech Republic) Jesika Malečková (Czech Republic) Miriam Škoch; 2–6, 6–3, [10–4]	(Georgia (country)) Oksana Kalashnikova; Elena Pridankina	(Australia) Maya Joint (Serbia) Lola Radivojević	(Latvia) Darja Semeņistaja (Egypt) Mayar Sherif (Croatia) Petra Marčinko (Germany) Mona Barthel
June 9	Lexus Ilkley Open; Ilkley, United Kingdom; Grass – $200,000 – 32S/24Q/16D; Singles – Doubles	(United States) Iva Jovic; 6–1, 6–3	(Canada) Rebecca Marino	(Switzerland) Céline Naef (Switzerland) Viktorija Golubic	(Philippines) Alexandra Eala (United Kingdom) Amarni Banks (Australia) Talia Gibson (France) Diane Parry
June 9	Lexus Ilkley Open; Ilkley, United Kingdom; Grass – $200,000 – 32S/24Q/16D; Singles – Doubles	(Netherlands) Isabelle Haverlag (Switzerland) Simona Waltert; 6–1, 6–1	Vitalia Diatchenko (United Kingdom) Eden Silva	(Switzerland) Céline Naef (Switzerland) Viktorija Golubic	(Philippines) Alexandra Eala (United Kingdom) Amarni Banks (Australia) Talia Gibson (France) Diane Parry
June 9	28th Città di Grado Tennis Cup; Grado, Italy; Clay – €100,000 – 32S/13Q/16D; Singles – Doubles	(Czech Republic) Tereza Valentová; 6–2, 4–6, 6–1	(Czech Republic) Barbora Palicová	(Croatia) Petra Marčinko (Czech Republic) Dominika Šalková	(Slovenia) Veronika Erjavec (Italy) Tyra Caterina Grant (Austria) Sinja Kraus (Austria) Julia Grabher
June 9	28th Città di Grado Tennis Cup; Grado, Italy; Clay – €100,000 – 32S/13Q/16D; Singles – Doubles	(United States) Quinn Gleason (Brazil) Ingrid Martins; 6–2, 5–7, [10–5]	(Slovenia) Veronika Erjavec (Czech Republic) Dominika Šalková	(Croatia) Petra Marčinko (Czech Republic) Dominika Šalková	(Slovenia) Veronika Erjavec (Italy) Tyra Caterina Grant (Austria) Sinja Kraus (Austria) Julia Grabher
June 9	BBVA Open Internacional de Valencia; Valencia, Spain; Clay – €100,000 – 32S/16Q/8D; Singles – Doubles	(Spain) Nuria Párrizas Díaz; 7–5, 7–6^{(11–9)}	(United States) Louisa Chirico	(Belgium) Hanne Vandewinkel (China) Gao Xinyu	(Argentina) Solana Sierra (Germany) Mona Barthel; Iryna Shymanovich (Czech Republic) Sára Bejlek
June 9	BBVA Open Internacional de Valencia; Valencia, Spain; Clay – €100,000 – 32S/16Q/8D; Singles – Doubles	Maria Kozyreva; Iryna Shymanovich; 6–3, 6–4	(Spain) Yvonne Cavallé Reimers (Spain) Ángela Fita Boluda	(Belgium) Hanne Vandewinkel (China) Gao Xinyu	(Argentina) Solana Sierra (Germany) Mona Barthel; Iryna Shymanovich (Czech Republic) Sára Bejlek

=== July ===
Week of	Tournament	Champions	Runners-up	Semifinalists	Quarterfinalists
July 7	Hall of Fame Open; Newport, United States; Grass – $200,000 – 32S/8Q/16D; Singles – Doubles	(United States) Caty McNally; 2–6, 6–4, 6–2	(Germany) Tatjana Maria	(Canada) Carol Zhao (United States) Elizabeth Mandlik	(Japan) Sayaka Ishii (United States) Alana Smith (Australia) Talia Gibson (Italy) Lucrezia Stefanini
July 7	Hall of Fame Open; Newport, United States; Grass – $200,000 – 32S/8Q/16D; Singles – Doubles	(United States) Carmen Corley (United States) Ivana Corley; 7–6^{(7–4)}, 6–3	(Netherlands) Arianne Hartono (India) Prarthana Thombare	(Canada) Carol Zhao (United States) Elizabeth Mandlik	(Japan) Sayaka Ishii (United States) Alana Smith (Australia) Talia Gibson (Italy) Lucrezia Stefanini
July 7	Nordea Open; Båstad, Sweden; Clay – $115,000 – 32S/16D; Singles – Doubles	(Italy) Elisabetta Cocciaretto; 6–3, 6–4	(Poland) Katarzyna Kawa	(Croatia) Antonia Ružić (Egypt) Mayar Sherif	(Italy) Lucia Bronzetti (United States) Louisa Chirico (Hungary) Dalma Gálfi (Latvia) Darja Semeņistaja
July 7	Nordea Open; Båstad, Sweden; Clay – $115,000 – 32S/16D; Singles – Doubles	(Czech Republic) Jesika Malečková (Czech Republic) Miriam Škoch; 6–4, 6–3	(Spain) Irene Burillo (Turkey) Berfu Cengiz	(Croatia) Antonia Ružić (Egypt) Mayar Sherif	(Italy) Lucia Bronzetti (United States) Louisa Chirico (Hungary) Dalma Gálfi (Latvia) Darja Semeņistaja
July 7	Grand Est Open 88; Contrexéville, France; Clay – €100,000 – 32S/16Q/8D; Singles – Doubles	(United Kingdom) Francesca Jones; 6–4, 7–6^{(7–2)}	(France) Elsa Jacquemot	Oksana Selekhmeteva (Croatia) Petra Marčinko	(France) Varvara Gracheva (Switzerland) Simona Waltert (Switzerland) Rebeka Masarova (Serbia) Lola Radivojević
July 7	Grand Est Open 88; Contrexéville, France; Clay – €100,000 – 32S/16Q/8D; Singles – Doubles	(United States) Quinn Gleason (Brazil) Ingrid Martins; 6–1, 7–6^{(7–4)}	(United Kingdom) Emily Appleton (Netherlands) Isabelle Haverlag	Oksana Selekhmeteva (Croatia) Petra Marčinko	(France) Varvara Gracheva (Switzerland) Simona Waltert (Switzerland) Rebeka Masarova (Serbia) Lola Radivojević
July 14	ATV Bancomat Tennis Open; Rome, Italy; Clay – €100,000 – 32S/8Q/8D; Singles – Doubles	(Croatia) Petra Marčinko; 6–3, 4–6, 6–3	Oksana Selekhmeteva	(Slovenia) Tamara Zidanšek (Latvia) Darja Semeņistaja	(United States) Varvara Lepchenko (Italy) Dalila Spiteri; Alisa Oktiabreva (Italy) Tyra Caterina Grant
July 14	ATV Bancomat Tennis Open; Rome, Italy; Clay – €100,000 – 32S/8Q/8D; Singles – Doubles	(Chinese Taipei) Cho I-hsuan (Chinese Taipei) Cho Yi-tsen; 4–6, 6–4, [10–6]	(Georgia (country)) Ekaterine Gorgodze (Latvia) Darja Semeņistaja	(Slovenia) Tamara Zidanšek (Latvia) Darja Semeņistaja	(United States) Varvara Lepchenko (Italy) Dalila Spiteri; Alisa Oktiabreva (Italy) Tyra Caterina Grant
July 14	Eupago Porto Open; Porto, Portugal; Hard – €100,000 – 32S/16Q/15D; Singles – Doubles	(Czech Republic) Tereza Valentová; 6–4, 6–2	(Thailand) Lanlana Tararudee	(Japan) Himeno Sakatsume (Germany) Anna-Lena Friedsam	Vitalia Diatchenko (China) Gao Xinyu (Portugal) Angelina Voloshchuk (Japan) Mai Hontama
July 14	Eupago Porto Open; Porto, Portugal; Hard – €100,000 – 32S/16Q/15D; Singles – Doubles	(United States) Carmen Corley (United States) Ivana Corley; 6–3, 6–1	(Chinese Taipei) Liang En-shuo (Thailand) Peangtarn Plipuech	(Japan) Himeno Sakatsume (Germany) Anna-Lena Friedsam	Vitalia Diatchenko (China) Gao Xinyu (Portugal) Angelina Voloshchuk (Japan) Mai Hontama
July 21	36° Palermo Ladies Open; Palermo, Italy; Clay – €100,000 – 32S/16Q/15D; Singles – Doubles	(United Kingdom) Francesca Jones; 6–3, 6–2	(Netherlands) Anouk Koevermans	Tatiana Prozorova (Austria) Julia Grabher	(Belgium) Hanne Vandewinkel (Hungary) Panna Udvardy (Spain) Kaitlin Quevedo (Slovenia) Tamara Zidanšek
July 21	36° Palermo Ladies Open; Palermo, Italy; Clay – €100,000 – 32S/16Q/15D; Singles – Doubles	(France) Estelle Cascino (China) Feng Shuo; 6–2, 6–7^{(2–7)}, [10–7]	(Japan) Momoko Kobori (Japan) Ayano Shimizu	Tatiana Prozorova (Austria) Julia Grabher	(Belgium) Hanne Vandewinkel (Hungary) Panna Udvardy (Spain) Kaitlin Quevedo (Slovenia) Tamara Zidanšek
July 28	T-Mobile Polish Open; Warsaw, Poland; Hard – $115,000 – 32S/8Q/8D; Singles – Doubles	(Czech Republic) Kateřina Siniaková; 6–1, 6–2	(Switzerland) Viktorija Golubic	(Andorra) Victoria Jiménez Kasintseva (Czech Republic) Dominika Šalková	Alina Korneeva (Germany) Ella Seidel (Ukraine) Daria Snigur (Japan) Kyōka Okamura
July 28	T-Mobile Polish Open; Warsaw, Poland; Hard – $115,000 – 32S/8Q/8D; Singles – Doubles	(Poland) Weronika Falkowska (Czech Republic) Dominika Šalková; 6–2, 6–1	(Netherlands) Isabelle Haverlag (Poland) Martyna Kubka	(Andorra) Victoria Jiménez Kasintseva (Czech Republic) Dominika Šalková	Alina Korneeva (Germany) Ella Seidel (Ukraine) Daria Snigur (Japan) Kyōka Okamura

=== September ===
Week of	Tournament	Champions	Runners-up	Semifinalists	Quarterfinalists
September 1	WTA Changsha Open; Changsha, China; Clay – $115,000 – 32S/16Q/16D; Singles – Doubles	(Slovenia) Veronika Erjavec; 6–1, 6–2	Maria Timofeeva	Alina Charaeva; Ekaterina Reyngold	(Argentina) María Lourdes Carlé (China) Gao Xinyu (Thailand) Lanlana Tararudee (Chinese Taipei) Joanna Garland
September 1	WTA Changsha Open; Changsha, China; Clay – $115,000 – 32S/16Q/16D; Singles – Doubles	(Hong Kong) Eudice Chong (Chinese Taipei) Liang En-shuo; 7–5, 6–3	(Chinese Taipei) Li Yu-yun (China) Yao Xinxin	Alina Charaeva; Ekaterina Reyngold	(Argentina) María Lourdes Carlé (China) Gao Xinyu (Thailand) Lanlana Tararudee (Chinese Taipei) Joanna Garland
September 1	Guadalajara 125 Open; Guadalajara, Mexico; Hard – $115,000 – 32S/8Q/8D; Singles – Doubles	(Philippines) Alexandra Eala; 1–6, 7–5, 6–3	(Hungary) Panna Udvardy	Maria Kozyreva (United States) Kayla Day	(United States) Alana Smith (United Kingdom) Francesca Jones (Colombia) Emiliana Arango (Italy) Nicole Fossa Huergo
September 1	Guadalajara 125 Open; Guadalajara, Mexico; Hard – $115,000 – 32S/8Q/8D; Singles – Doubles	Maria Kozyreva; Iryna Shymanovich; 6–3, 6–4	Irina Khromacheva; Kamilla Rakhimova	Maria Kozyreva (United States) Kayla Day	(United States) Alana Smith (United Kingdom) Francesca Jones (Colombia) Emiliana Arango (Italy) Nicole Fossa Huergo
September 1	Montreux Ladies Open; Montreux, Switzerland; Clay – $115,000 – 32S/11Q/8D; Singles – Doubles	(Poland) Maja Chwalińska; 6–1, 6–2	(Latvia) Darja Semeņistaja	(Spain) Andrea Lázaro García (Ukraine) Oleksandra Oliynykova	(Netherlands) Arantxa Rus (Austria) Julia Grabher (Romania) Anca Todoni (Switzerland) Simona Waltert
September 1	Montreux Ladies Open; Montreux, Switzerland; Clay – $115,000 – 32S/11Q/8D; Singles – Doubles	Oksana Selekhmeteva (Switzerland) Simona Waltert; 6–4, 6–1	(Netherlands) Arantxa Rus (Romania) Anca Todoni	(Spain) Andrea Lázaro García (Ukraine) Oleksandra Oliynykova	(Netherlands) Arantxa Rus (Austria) Julia Grabher (Romania) Anca Todoni (Switzerland) Simona Waltert
September 8	International Women's Tennis Huzhou Open; Huzhou, China; Clay – $115,000 – 32S/16Q/16D; Singles – Doubles	(Slovenia) Veronika Erjavec; 6–2, 6–1	Alina Charaeva	Anastasia Gasanova (France) Carole Monnet	(Italy) Jessica Pieri (Japan) Kyōka Okamura (Japan) Mai Hontama (Germany) Anna-Lena Friedsam
September 8	International Women's Tennis Huzhou Open; Huzhou, China; Clay – $115,000 – 32S/16Q/16D; Singles – Doubles	(Slovenia) Veronika Erjavec (Kazakhstan) Zhibek Kulambayeva; 6–4, 6–2	(Japan) Momoko Kobori (Japan) Ayano Shimizu	Anastasia Gasanova (France) Carole Monnet	(Italy) Jessica Pieri (Japan) Kyōka Okamura (Japan) Mai Hontama (Germany) Anna-Lena Friedsam
September 8	WTA Zavarovalnica Sava Ljubljana; Ljubljana, Slovenia; Clay – €115,000 – 32S/8Q/16D; Singles – Doubles	(Slovenia) Kaja Juvan; 6–4, 6–4	(Switzerland) Simona Waltert	(Slovakia) Renáta Jamrichová (Germany) Mona Barthel	(Poland) Maja Chwalińska (Belgium) Hanne Vandewinkel (Ukraine) Oleksandra Oliynykova (Hungary) Amarissa Tóth
September 8	WTA Zavarovalnica Sava Ljubljana; Ljubljana, Slovenia; Clay – €115,000 – 32S/8Q/16D; Singles – Doubles	(Czech Republic) Miriam Škoch (Switzerland) Simona Waltert; 6–2, 6–2	(Slovenia) Dalila Jakupović (Slovenia) Nika Radišić	(Slovakia) Renáta Jamrichová (Germany) Mona Barthel	(Poland) Maja Chwalińska (Belgium) Hanne Vandewinkel (Ukraine) Oleksandra Oliynykova (Hungary) Amarissa Tóth
September 8	Open Internacional de San Sebastián; San Sebastián, Spain; Clay – €100,000 – 32S/16Q/8D; Singles – Doubles	Oksana Selekhmeteva; 6–0, 6–4	(Netherlands) Anouk Koevermans	(Germany) Tamara Korpatsch (Latvia) Darja Semeņistaja	(Netherlands) Arantxa Rus (Serbia) Lola Radivojević (Canada) Carson Branstine (Spain) Ángela Fita Boluda
September 8	Open Internacional de San Sebastián; San Sebastián, Spain; Clay – €100,000 – 32S/16Q/8D; Singles – Doubles	Anastasia Tikhonova (Croatia) Tara Würth; 6–3, 6–0	(United States) Elvina Kalieva (Romania) Gabriela Lee	(Germany) Tamara Korpatsch (Latvia) Darja Semeņistaja	(Netherlands) Arantxa Rus (Serbia) Lola Radivojević (Canada) Carson Branstine (Spain) Ángela Fita Boluda
September 15	Lexus Tolentino Open; Tolentino, Italy; Clay – €100,000 – 32S/14Q/16D; Singles – Doubles	(Ukraine) Oleksandra Oliynykova; 6–2, 6–0	(Italy) Nuria Brancaccio	(Netherlands) Arantxa Rus (Italy) Silvia Ambrosio	(Georgia (country)) Ekaterine Gorgodze (Serbia) Lola Radivojević (France) Alice Ramé (Slovenia) Tamara Zidanšek
September 15	Lexus Tolentino Open; Tolentino, Italy; Clay – €100,000 – 32S/14Q/16D; Singles – Doubles	(Czech Republic) Jesika Malečková (Czech Republic) Miriam Škoch; 6–3, 3–6, [10–8]	(Italy) Silvia Ambrosio (Italy) Nuria Brancaccio	(Netherlands) Arantxa Rus (Italy) Silvia Ambrosio	(Georgia (country)) Ekaterine Gorgodze (Serbia) Lola Radivojević (France) Alice Ramé (Slovenia) Tamara Zidanšek
September 15	Full Protein Caldas da Rainha Ladies Open; Caldas da Rainha, Portugal; Hard – €100,000 – 32S/13Q/16D; Singles – Doubles	Polina Iatcenko; 6–2, 5–7, 6–2	(Czech Republic) Gabriela Knutson	(Spain) Kaitlin Quevedo (United States) Carol Young Suh Lee	(Croatia) Petra Marčinko (Slovakia) Renáta Jamrichová (Ukraine) Daria Snigur (Germany) Tamara Korpatsch
September 15	Full Protein Caldas da Rainha Ladies Open; Caldas da Rainha, Portugal; Hard – €100,000 – 32S/13Q/16D; Singles – Doubles	(United Kingdom) Harriet Dart (United Kingdom) Maia Lumsden; 6–0, 6–3	(United Kingdom) Madeleine Brooks; Anastasia Tikhonova	(Spain) Kaitlin Quevedo (United States) Carol Young Suh Lee	(Croatia) Petra Marčinko (Slovakia) Renáta Jamrichová (Ukraine) Daria Snigur (Germany) Tamara Korpatsch
September 22	HuBei Bank Jingshan Tennis Open; Jingshan, China; Hard – $160,000 – 32S/14Q/16D; Singles – Doubles	(New Zealand) Lulu Sun; 6–4, 6–2	(China) Ma Yexin	(Philippines) Alexandra Eala (Australia) Talia Gibson	(China) Lu Jiajing; Elena Pridankina (Japan) Rina Saigo (Chinese Taipei) Liang En-shuo
September 22	HuBei Bank Jingshan Tennis Open; Jingshan, China; Hard – $160,000 – 32S/14Q/16D; Singles – Doubles	(Hong Kong) Eudice Chong (Chinese Taipei) Liang En-shuo; 7–6^{(7–4)}, 6–2	(Chinese Taipei) Lee Ya-hsin (Hong Kong) Cody Wong	(Philippines) Alexandra Eala (Australia) Talia Gibson	(China) Lu Jiajing; Elena Pridankina (Japan) Rina Saigo (Chinese Taipei) Liang En-shuo
September 29	Internazionali di Calabria; Rende, Italy; Clay – $115,000 – 32S/16Q/16D; Singles – Doubles	(Czech Republic) Sára Bejlek; 6–2, 6–7^{(1–7)}, 6–3	(Serbia) Lola Radivojević	(Slovenia) Tamara Zidanšek (Poland) Maja Chwalińska	(Italy) Anastasia Abbagnato (Switzerland) Simona Waltert (Italy) Nuria Brancaccio; Oksana Selekhmeteva
September 29	Internazionali di Calabria; Rende, Italy; Clay – $115,000 – 32S/16Q/16D; Singles – Doubles	(Italy) Nicole Fossa Huergo (Georgia (country)) Ekaterine Gorgodze; 3–6, 6–1, [10–4]	(Italy) Federica Urgesi (Italy) Aurora Zantedeschi	(Slovenia) Tamara Zidanšek (Poland) Maja Chwalińska	(Italy) Anastasia Abbagnato (Switzerland) Simona Waltert (Italy) Nuria Brancaccio; Oksana Selekhmeteva
September 29	Samsun Open; Samsun, Turkey; Hard – $115,000 – 32S/16Q/16D; Singles – Doubles	(Slovenia) Kaja Juvan; 7–6^{(10–8)}, 6–3	(Czech Republic) Nikola Bartůňková	(Czech Republic) Darja Vidmanová (Poland) Linda Klimovičová	(France) Amandine Hesse (Spain) Kaitlin Quevedo (Belgium) Sofia Costoulas; Maria Timofeeva
September 29	Samsun Open; Samsun, Turkey; Hard – $115,000 – 32S/16Q/16D; Singles – Doubles	(Switzerland) Naïma Karamoko (France) Tiantsoa Rakotomanga Rajaonah; 7–5, 1–6, [10–6]	(United Kingdom) Harriet Dart (United Kingdom) Maia Lumsden	(Czech Republic) Darja Vidmanová (Poland) Linda Klimovičová	(France) Amandine Hesse (Spain) Kaitlin Quevedo (Belgium) Sofia Costoulas; Maria Timofeeva
September 29	Suzhou WTA 125; Suzhou, China; Hard – $115,000 – 32S/16Q/16D; Singles – Doubles	(Switzerland) Viktorija Golubic; 4–6, 6–4, 6–4	(United States) Katie Volynets	(Andorra) Victoria Jiménez Kasintseva (Germany) Tatjana Maria	(Japan) Kyōka Okamura (United States) Caroline Dolehide (Philippines) Alexandra Eala (Kazakhstan) Yulia Putintseva
September 29	Suzhou WTA 125; Suzhou, China; Hard – $115,000 – 32S/16Q/16D; Singles – Doubles	(Indonesia) Aldila Sutjiadi (Indonesia) Janice Tjen; 6–4, 6–3	(Poland) Katarzyna Kawa (Japan) Makoto Ninomiya	(Andorra) Victoria Jiménez Kasintseva (Germany) Tatjana Maria	(Japan) Kyōka Okamura (United States) Caroline Dolehide (Philippines) Alexandra Eala (Kazakhstan) Yulia Putintseva

=== October ===
Week of	Tournament	Champions	Runners-up	Semifinalists	Quarterfinalists
October 6	Vanda Pharmaceuticals Mallorca Women's Championships; Mallorca, Spain; Clay – $115,000 – 32S/15Q/8D; Singles – Doubles	(Argentina) Solana Sierra; 6–3, 6–1	(Serbia) Lola Radivojević	(Spain) Andrea Lázaro García (Serbia) Teodora Kostović	(Georgia (country)) Ekaterine Gorgodze (Czech Republic) Sára Bejlek (Germany) Noma Noha Akugue (Argentina) María Lourdes Carlé
October 6	Vanda Pharmaceuticals Mallorca Women's Championships; Mallorca, Spain; Clay – $115,000 – 32S/15Q/8D; Singles – Doubles	(Czech Republic) Jesika Malečková (Czech Republic) Miriam Škoch; 6–4, 6–0	(Germany) Noma Noha Akugue (Germany) Mariella Thamm	(Spain) Andrea Lázaro García (Serbia) Teodora Kostović	(Georgia (country)) Ekaterine Gorgodze (Czech Republic) Sára Bejlek (Germany) Noma Noha Akugue (Argentina) María Lourdes Carlé
October 13	WTA 125 Jinan Open; Jinan, China; Hard – $115,000 – 32S/16Q/16D; Singles – Doubles	(Indonesia) Janice Tjen; 6–4, 4–6, 6–4	(Hungary) Anna Bondár	(New Zealand) Lulu Sun (Indonesia) Priska Nugroho	Anastasia Zakharova (China) Gao Xinyu (Australia) Arina Rodionova (China) Ma Yexin
October 13	WTA 125 Jinan Open; Jinan, China; Hard – $115,000 – 32S/16Q/16D; Singles – Doubles	Elena Pridankina; Ekaterina Reyngold; 6–1, 6–3	(India) Rutuja Bhosale (China) Zheng Wushuang	(New Zealand) Lulu Sun (Indonesia) Priska Nugroho	Anastasia Zakharova (China) Gao Xinyu (Australia) Arina Rodionova (China) Ma Yexin
October 13	Rio Ladies Open; Rio de Janeiro, Brazil; Clay – $115,000 – 32S/8Q/16D; Singles – Doubles	(Switzerland) Simona Waltert; 7–5, 6–2	(France) Alice Ramé	(Austria) Julia Grabher (Georgia (country)) Ekaterine Gorgodze	(Croatia) Tara Würth (Austria) Sinja Kraus (Italy) Martina Colmegna (Burundi) Sada Nahimana
October 13	Rio Ladies Open; Rio de Janeiro, Brazil; Clay – $115,000 – 32S/8Q/16D; Singles – Doubles	(Spain) Leyre Romero Gormaz (Croatia) Tara Würth; 6–4, 6–1	(Spain) Irene Burillo (Georgia (country)) Ekaterine Gorgodze	(Austria) Julia Grabher (Georgia (country)) Ekaterine Gorgodze	(Croatia) Tara Würth (Austria) Sinja Kraus (Italy) Martina Colmegna (Burundi) Sada Nahimana
October 13	Abierto Tampico; Tampico, Mexico; Hard – $115,000 – 32S/13Q/14D; Singles – Doubles	(Belgium) Hanne Vandewinkel; 6–4, 6–3	(Canada) Cadence Brace	(Italy) Jessica Pieri (United Kingdom) Harriet Dart	(United States) Katrina Scott (United States) Elvina Kalieva (Canada) Marina Stakusic (Croatia) Petra Marčinko
October 13	Abierto Tampico; Tampico, Mexico; Hard – $115,000 – 32S/13Q/14D; Singles – Doubles	(Canada) Kayla Cross (United Kingdom) Amelia Rajecki; 6–4, 6–3	(Poland) Weronika Falkowska (Slovenia) Kristina Novak	(Italy) Jessica Pieri (United Kingdom) Harriet Dart	(United States) Katrina Scott (United States) Elvina Kalieva (Canada) Marina Stakusic (Croatia) Petra Marčinko
October 20	Querétaro Open; Querétaro, Mexico; Clay – $115,000 – 32S/11Q/8D; Singles – Doubles	(Czech Republic) Sára Bejlek; 6–2, 6–1	(United States) Katrina Scott	(Italy) Martina Colmegna (Belgium) Hanne Vandewinkel	(France) Séléna Janicijevic (Italy) Jessica Pieri (Spain) Alicia Herrero Liñana (Romania) Miriam Bulgaru
October 20	Querétaro Open; Querétaro, Mexico; Clay – $115,000 – 32S/11Q/8D; Singles – Doubles	(Spain) Alicia Herrero Liñana (Ukraine) Valeriya Strakhova; 7–5, 6–2	(Mexico) Marian Gómez Pezuela Cano (United States) Varvara Lepchenko	(Italy) Martina Colmegna (Belgium) Hanne Vandewinkel	(France) Séléna Janicijevic (Italy) Jessica Pieri (Spain) Alicia Herrero Liñana (Romania) Miriam Bulgaru
October 20	Rovereto Open Città Della Pace; Rovereto, Italy; Hard (i) – €100,000 – 32S/16Q/16D; Singles – Doubles	Oksana Selekhmeteva; 6–1, 6–1	(Italy) Lucrezia Stefanini	(Belgium) Sofia Costoulas (Switzerland) Susan Bandecchi	(Latvia) Darja Semeņistaja (Czech Republic) Gabriela Knutson (Spain) Aliona Bolsova (Germany) Anna-Lena Friedsam
October 20	Rovereto Open Città Della Pace; Rovereto, Italy; Hard (i) – €100,000 – 32S/16Q/16D; Singles – Doubles	(Czech Republic) Jesika Malečková (Czech Republic) Miriam Škoch; 6–0, 4–6, [10–4]	(Italy) Silvia Ambrosio (Italy) Aurora Zantedeschi	(Belgium) Sofia Costoulas (Switzerland) Susan Bandecchi	(Latvia) Darja Semeņistaja (Czech Republic) Gabriela Knutson (Spain) Aliona Bolsova (Germany) Anna-Lena Friedsam
October 20	Engie Open; Florianópolis, Brazil; Clay – $115,000 – 32S/8Q/13D; Singles – Doubles	(Austria) Julia Grabher; 3–6, 6–4, 6–0	(France) Carole Monnet	(Austria) Sinja Kraus (Ukraine) Oleksandra Oliynykova	(Spain) Leyre Romero Gormaz (France) Alice Ramé (Hungary) Panna Udvardy (Switzerland) Simona Waltert
October 20	Engie Open; Florianópolis, Brazil; Clay – $115,000 – 32S/8Q/13D; Singles – Doubles	(Spain) Irene Burillo (Georgia (country)) Ekaterine Gorgodze; 6–1, 6–4	(France) Carole Monnet (Burundi) Sada Nahimana	(Austria) Sinja Kraus (Ukraine) Oleksandra Oliynykova	(Spain) Leyre Romero Gormaz (France) Alice Ramé (Hungary) Panna Udvardy (Switzerland) Simona Waltert
October 27	Kia Open; Cali, Colombia; Clay – $115,000 – 32S/14Q/14D; Singles – Doubles	(Austria) Sinja Kraus; 6–2, 6–0	(Hungary) Panna Udvardy	(Czech Republic) Sára Bejlek (Argentina) Jazmín Ortenzi	(Argentina) Julia Riera (United States) Varvara Lepchenko (France) Séléna Janicijevic (Austria) Julia Grabher
October 27	Kia Open; Cali, Colombia; Clay – $115,000 – 32S/14Q/14D; Singles – Doubles	(Brazil) Ana Candiotto (Brazil) Laura Pigossi; 6–3, 6–1	(Italy) Nicole Fossa Huergo (Georgia (country)) Ekaterine Gorgodze	(Czech Republic) Sára Bejlek (Argentina) Jazmín Ortenzi	(Argentina) Julia Riera (United States) Varvara Lepchenko (France) Séléna Janicijevic (Austria) Julia Grabher

=== November ===
Week of	Tournament	Champions	Runners-up	Semifinalists	Quarterfinalists
November 3	Austin 125; Austin, United States; Hard – $115,000 – 32S/8Q/8D; Singles – Doubles	(Mexico) Renata Zarazúa; 6–4, 3–6, 6–3	(Canada) Marina Stakusic	(United States) Iva Jovic (Romania) Carmen Andreea Herea	(United States) Mary Stoiana (United States) Varvara Lepchenko (United States) Elizabeth Mandlik (United States) Malaika Rapolu
November 3	Austin 125; Austin, United States; Hard – $115,000 – 32S/8Q/8D; Singles – Doubles	Maria Kozyreva; Iryna Shymanovich; 6–3, 7–6^{(7–4)}	(United States) Carmen Corley (United States) Ivana Corley	(United States) Iva Jovic (Romania) Carmen Andreea Herea	(United States) Mary Stoiana (United States) Varvara Lepchenko (United States) Elizabeth Mandlik (United States) Malaika Rapolu
November 3	Tucumán Open; San Miguel de Tucumán, Argentina; Clay – $115,000 – 32S/8Q/8D; Singles – Doubles	(Ukraine) Oleksandra Oliynykova; 3–6, 6–2, 6–2	(Egypt) Mayar Sherif	(Greece) Despina Papamichail (Switzerland) Simona Waltert	(Argentina) Solana Sierra (Argentina) Jazmin Ortenzi (Chile) Antonia Vergara Rivera (Argentina) Julia Riera
November 3	Tucumán Open; San Miguel de Tucumán, Argentina; Clay – $115,000 – 32S/8Q/8D; Singles – Doubles	(Netherlands) Lian Tran; Anastasia Zolotareva; 2–6, 6–1, [10–6]	(Spain) Alicia Herrero Liñana (Ukraine) Valeriya Strakhova	(Greece) Despina Papamichail (Switzerland) Simona Waltert	(Argentina) Solana Sierra (Argentina) Jazmin Ortenzi (Chile) Antonia Vergara Rivera (Argentina) Julia Riera
November 17	LP Open by IND; Colina, Chile; Clay – $115,000 – 32S/8Q/16D; Singles – Doubles	(Ukraine) Oleksandra Oliynykova; 7–5, 6–1	(France) Léolia Jeanjean	(Czech Republic) Laura Samson (Egypt) Mayar Sherif	(France) Carole Monnet (Slovenia) Polona Hercog (Poland) Maja Chwalińska (Argentina) María Lourdes Carlé
November 17	LP Open by IND; Colina, Chile; Clay – $115,000 – 32S/8Q/16D; Singles – Doubles	(Argentina) María Lourdes Carlé (Spain) Sara Sorribes Tormo; 6–2, 6–4	(France) Léolia Jeanjean (Ukraine) Valeriya Strakhova	(Czech Republic) Laura Samson (Egypt) Mayar Sherif	(France) Carole Monnet (Slovenia) Polona Hercog (Poland) Maja Chwalińska (Argentina) María Lourdes Carlé
November 24	IEB+ Argentina Open; Buenos Aires, Argentina; Clay – $115,000 – 32S/8Q/8D; Singles – Doubles	(Hungary) Panna Udvardy; 6–3, 7–5	(United States) Varvara Lepchenko	(Egypt) Mayar Sherif (Slovenia) Veronika Erjavec	(United States) Caroline Dolehide (Peru) Lucciana Pérez Alarcón (Romania) Miriam Bulgaru (Czech Republic) Laura Samson
November 24	IEB+ Argentina Open; Buenos Aires, Argentina; Clay – $115,000 – 32S/8Q/8D; Singles – Doubles	(Spain) Alicia Herrero Liñana (Brazil) Laura Pigossi; 6–2, 7–6^{(7–5)}	(Argentina) Nicole Fossa Huergo (Czech Republic) Laura Samson	(Egypt) Mayar Sherif (Slovenia) Veronika Erjavec	(United States) Caroline Dolehide (Peru) Lucciana Pérez Alarcón (Romania) Miriam Bulgaru (Czech Republic) Laura Samson

=== December ===
Week of	Tournament	Champions	Runners-up	Semifinalists	Quarterfinalists
December 1	Quito Open; Quito, Ecuador; Clay – $115,000 – 32S/8Q/8D; Singles – Doubles	(Slovenia) Polona Hercog; 6–2, 6–1	(Argentina) Luisina Giovannini	(Greece) Despina Papamichail (France) Léolia Jeanjean	(Ecuador) Mell Reasco González (Hungary) Panna Udvardy (Slovenia) Veronika Erjavec (United States) Elvina Kalieva
December 1	Quito Open; Quito, Ecuador; Clay – $115,000 – 32S/8Q/8D; Singles – Doubles	(Ukraine) Valeriya Strakhova; Anastasia Tikhonova; 6–4, 6–1	(Spain) Irene Burillo; Anastasia Zolotareva	(Greece) Despina Papamichail (France) Léolia Jeanjean	(Ecuador) Mell Reasco González (Hungary) Panna Udvardy (Slovenia) Veronika Erjavec (United States) Elvina Kalieva
December 1	Open Angers Loire Trélazé; Angers, France; Hard (i) – $115,000 – 32S/6Q/6D; Singles – Doubles	(Uzbekistan) Kamilla Rakhimova; 6–3, 7–6^{(7–4)}	(Germany) Tamara Korpatsch	(Germany) Anna-Lena Friedsam (Croatia) Antonia Ružić	(United States) Alycia Parks (Turkey) Zeynep Sönmez (Germany) Mona Barthel (Czech Republic) Dominika Šalková
December 1	Open Angers Loire Trélazé; Angers, France; Hard (i) – $115,000 – 32S/6Q/6D; Singles – Doubles	(Germany) Tamara Korpatsch (France) Jessika Ponchet; 6–3, 6–2	(Czech Republic) Jesika Malečková (Czech Republic) Miriam Škoch	(Germany) Anna-Lena Friedsam (Croatia) Antonia Ružić	(United States) Alycia Parks (Turkey) Zeynep Sönmez (Germany) Mona Barthel (Czech Republic) Dominika Šalková
December 8	Open BLS de Limoges; Limoges, France; Hard (i) – $115,000 – 32S/8Q/8D; Singles – Doubles	(Ukraine) Anhelina Kalinina; 6–3, 4–6, 7–5	(France) Elsa Jacquemot	(Spain) Cristina Bucșa (Germany) Anna-Lena Friedsam	(Croatia) Antonia Ružić (United States) Alycia Parks (France) Tiantsoa Rakotomanga Rajaonah (Czech Republic) Anna Sisková
December 8	Open BLS de Limoges; Limoges, France; Hard (i) – $115,000 – 32S/8Q/8D; Singles – Doubles	(Spain) Cristina Bucșa (China) Zhang Shuai; 6–3, 6–1	(France) Elsa Jacquemot (France) Jessika Ponchet	(Spain) Cristina Bucșa (Germany) Anna-Lena Friedsam	(Croatia) Antonia Ružić (United States) Alycia Parks (France) Tiantsoa Rakotomanga Rajaonah (Czech Republic) Anna Sisková

== Statistical information ==
These tables present the number of singles (S) and doubles (D) titles won by each player and each nation during the season. The players/nations are sorted by: 1) total number of titles (a doubles title won by two players representing the same nation counts as only one win for the nation); 2) a singles > doubles hierarchy; 3) alphabetical order (by family names for players).

To avoid confusion and double counting, these tables should be updated only after an event is completed.

=== Titles won by player ===
Total	Player	S	D	S	D
7	Miriam Škoch (CZE)		● ● ● ● ● ● ●	0	7
6	Simona Waltert (SUI)	●	● ● ● ● ●	1	5
6	Jesika Malečková (CZE)		● ● ● ● ● ●	0	6
4	Maria Kozyreva (Note: As of 1 March 2022, the ATP and WTA announced that players from Russia and Belarus will not compete in tournaments under the name or flag of Russia or Belarus due to the Russian invasion of Ukraine.)		● ● ● ●	0	4
4	Iryna Shymanovich		● ● ● ●	0	4
3	Sára Bejlek (CZE)	● ● ●		3	0
3	Oleksandra Oliynykova (UKR)	● ● ●		3	0
3	Veronika Erjavec (SLO)	● ●	●	2	1
3	Oksana Selekhmeteva	● ●	●	2	1
2	Dalma Gálfi (HUN)	● ●		2	0
2	Francesca Jones (GBR)	● ●		2	0
2	Kaja Juvan (SLO)	● ●		2	0
2	Solana Sierra (ARG)	● ●		2	0
2	Anca Todoni (ROU)	● ●		2	0
2	Tereza Valentová (CZE)	● ●		2	0
2	Maja Chwalińska (POL)	●	●	1	1
2	Janice Tjen (INA)	●	●	1	1
2	Cristina Bucșa (ESP)		● ●	0	2
2	María Lourdes Carlé (ARG)		● ●	0	2
2	Eudice Chong (HKG)		● ●	0	2
2	Carmen Corley (USA)		● ●	0	2
2	Ivana Corley (USA)		● ●	0	2
2	Quinn Gleason (USA)		● ●	0	2
2	Ekaterine Gorgodze (GEO)		● ●	0	2
2	Alicia Herrero Liñana (ESP)		● ●	0	2
2	Liang En-shuo (TPE)		● ●	0	2
2	Maia Lumsden (GBR)		● ●	0	2
2	Ingrid Martins (BRA)		● ●	0	2
2	Laura Pigossi (BRA)		● ●	0	2
2	Elena Pridankina		● ●	0	2
2	Valeriya Strakhova (UKR)		● ●	0	2
2	Aldila Sutjiadi (INA)		● ●	0	2
2	Anastasia Tikhonova		● ●	0	2
2	Tara Würth (CRO)		● ●	0	2
1	Emiliana Arango (COL)	●		1	0
1	Katie Boulter (GBR)	●		1	0
1	Elisabetta Cocciaretto (ITA)	●		1	0
1	Jaqueline Cristian (ROU)	●		1	0
1	Olga Danilović (SRB)	●		1	0
1	Alexandra Eala (PHI)	●		1	0
1	Viktorija Golubic (SUI)	●		1	0
1	Julia Grabher (AUT)	●		1	0
1	Polona Hercog (SLO)	●		1	0
1	Polina Iatcenko	●		1	0
1	Aoi Ito (JPN)	●		1	0
1	Iva Jovic (USA)	●		1	0
1	Anhelina Kalinina (UKR)	●		1	0
1	Sinja Kraus (AUT)	●		1	0
1	Petra Marčinko (CRO)	●		1	0
1	Caty McNally (USA)	●		1	0
1	Greet Minnen (BEL)	●		1	0
1	Naomi Osaka (JPN)	●		1	0
1	Nuria Párrizas Díaz (ESP)	●		1	0
1	Kamilla Rakhimova (UZB)	●		1	0
1	Darja Semeņistaja (LAT)	●		1	0
1	Mayar Sherif (EGY)	●		1	0
1	Kateřina Siniaková (CZE)	●		1	0
1	Lulu Sun (NZL)	●		1	0
1	Jil Teichmann (SUI)	●		1	0
1	Panna Udvardy (HUN)	●		1	0
1	Hanne Vandewinkel (BEL)	●		1	0
1	Renata Zarazúa (MEX)	●		1	0
1	Destanee Aiava (AUS)		●	0	1
1	Bianca Andreescu (CAN)		●	0	1
1	Amina Anshba		●	0	1
1	Anna Bondár (HUN)		●	0	1
1	Irene Burillo (ESP)		●	0	1
1	Ana Candiotto (BRA)		●	0	1
1	Estelle Cascino (FRA)		●	0	1
1	Hanna Chang (USA)		●	0	1
1	Cho I-hsuan (TPE)		●	0	1
1	Cho Yi-tsen (TPE)		●	0	1
1	Kayla Cross (CAN)		●	0	1
1	Harriet Dart (GBR)		●	0	1
1	Anastasia Dețiuc (CZE)		●	0	1
1	Weronika Falkowska (POL)		●	0	1
1	Feng Shuo (CHN)		●	0	1
1	Nicole Fossa Huergo (ITA)		●	0	1
1	Jaimee Fourlis (AUS)		●	0	1
1	Isabelle Haverlag (NED)		●	0	1
1	Petra Hule (AUS)		●	0	1
1	Maya Joint (AUS)		●	0	1
1	Francisca Jorge (POR)		●	0	1
1	Matilde Jorge (POR)		●	0	1
1	Naïma Karamoko (SUI)		●	0	1
1	Magali Kempen (BEL)		●	0	1
1	Irina Khromacheva		●	0	1
1	Tamara Korpatsch (GER)		●	0	1
1	Zhibek Kulambayeva (KAZ)		●	0	1
1	Christina McHale (USA)		●	0	1
1	Makoto Ninomiya (JPN)		●	0	1
1	Jessika Ponchet (FRA)		●	0	1
1	Taylah Preston (AUS)		●	0	1
1	Amelia Rajecki (GBR)		●	0	1
1	Tiantsoa Rakotomanga Rajaonah (FRA)		●	0	1
1	Ekaterina Reyngold		●	0	1
1	Leyre Romero Gormaz (ESP)		●	0	1
1	Dominika Šalková (CZE)		●	0	1
1	Anna Sisková (CZE)		●	0	1
1	Sara Sorribes Tormo (ESP)		●	0	1
1	Fanny Stollár (HUN)		●	0	1
1	Lian Tran (NED)		●	0	1
1	Zhang Shuai (CHN)		●	0	1
1	Anastasia Zolotareva		●	0	1

=== Titles won by nation ===
Total	Nation	S	D
16	Czech Republic (CZE)	6	10
9	Switzerland (SUI)	3	6
8	Spain (ESP)	1	7
7	United States (USA)	2	5
6	Slovenia (SLO)	5	1
6	Ukraine (UKR)	4	2
6	Great Britain (GBR)	3	3
5	Hungary (HUN)	3	2
4	Argentina (ARG)	2	2
4	Brazil (BRA)	0	4
3	Romania (ROU)	3	0
3	Belgium (BEL)	2	1
3	Japan (JPN)	2	1
3	Croatia (CRO)	1	2
3	Indonesia (INA)	1	2
3	Poland (POL)	1	2
3	Australia (AUS)	0	3
3	Chinese Taipei (TPE)	0	3
3	France (FRA)	0	3
2	Austria (AUT)	2	0
2	Italy (ITA)	1	1
2	Canada (CAN)	0	2
2	China (CHN)	0	2
2	Georgia (GEO)	0	2
2	Hong Kong (HKG)	0	2
2	Netherlands (NED)	0	2
1	Colombia (COL)	1	0
1	Egypt (EGY)	1	0
1	Latvia (LAT)	1	0
1	Mexico (MEX)	1	0
1	New Zealand (NZL)	1	0
1	Philippines (PHI)	1	0
1	Serbia (SRB)	1	0
1	Uzbekistan (UZB)	1	0
1	Germany (GER)	0	1
1	Kazakhstan (KAZ)	0	1
1	Portugal (POR)	0	1

== Points distribution ==
Event	W	F	SF	QF	R16	R32	Q	Q2	Q1
Singles	125	81	49	27	15	1	6	4	1
Doubles (16D)	125	81	49	27	1	—N/a	—N/a	—N/a	—N/a
Doubles (8D)	125	81	49	1	—N/a	—N/a	—N/a	—N/a	—N/a

== See also ==
- 2025 WTA Tour
- 2025 ITF Women's World Tennis Tour
- 2025 ATP Challenger Tour
