= 2019 Changsha Open =

Tennis tournament

- Date: 2–8 September 2019
- Edition: 1st
- Category: ITF Women's World Tennis Tour
- Prize money: $60,000
- Surface: Clay
- Location: Changsha, China

Champions

Singles
- (Serbia) Nina Stojanović

Doubles
- (China) Jiang Xinyu / (China) Tang Qianhui
Changsha Open	· 2025 →

The 2019 Changsha Open was a professional tennis tournament played on outdoor clay courts. It was the first edition of the tournament which was part of the 2019 ITF Women's World Tennis Tour. It took place in Changsha, China between 2 and 8 September 2019.

== Singles main-draw entrants ==
=== Seeds ===
Country	Player	Rank^{1}	Seed
SRB	Nina Stojanović	165	1
CHN	Han Xinyun	169	2
CHN	Lu Jiajing	188	3
SRB	Natalija Kostić	216	4
CHN	Ma Shuyue	236	5
CHN	Xun Fangying	255	6
CHN	Yuan Yue	259	7
JPN	Chihiro Muramatsu	308	8

- ^{1} Rankings are as of 26 August 2019.

=== Other entrants ===
The following players received wildcards into the singles main draw:

- (China) Cao Siqi
- (China) Liu Siqi
- (China) Zhang Ying
- (China) Zhao Qianqian

The following player received entry using a protected ranking:

- (China) Gao Xinyu

The following players received entry from the qualifying draw:

- (Russia) Angelina Gabueva
- (China) Guo Meiqi
- (Croatia) Oleksandra Oliynykova
- (Indonesia) Jessy Rompies
- (China) Sun Xuliu
- (China) Yuan Chengyiyi
- (China) Zheng Wushuang
- (United States) Amy Zhu

== Champions ==
=== Singles ===
- (Serbia) Nina Stojanović def. (Bulgaria) Aleksandrina Naydenova, 6–1, 6–1

=== Doubles ===
- (China) Jiang Xinyu / (China) Tang Qianhui def. (India) Rutuja Bhosale / (Japan) Erika Sema, 6–3, 3–6, [11–9]
