= 2024 Mexico Series Puerto Vallarta 125 =

- Date: 19–25 February
- Edition: 1st
- Category: WTA 125
- Draw: 32S / 8D
- Prize money: $115,000
- Surface: Hard
- Location: Puerto Vallarta, Mexico
- Venue: Parque Parota

Champions

Singles
- (United States) McCartney Kessler

Doubles
- Iryna Shymanovich / (Mexico) Renata Zarazúa
Puerto Vallarta Open	· 2025 →

The 2024 Mexico Series Puerto Vallarta 125 was a professional women's tennis tournament played on outdoor hardcourts. It was the first edition of the tournament and part of the 2024 WTA 125 tournaments, offering a total of $115,000 in prize money. It took place at the Parque Parota in Puerto Vallarta, Mexico between 19 and 25 February 2024.

== Singles entrants ==
=== Seeds ===
Country	Player	Rank^{1}	Seed
SVK	Anna Karolína Schmiedlová	77	1
BEL	Yanina Wickmayer	80	2
USA	Taylor Townsend	81	3
MEX	Renata Zarazúa	101	4
ARG	María Lourdes Carlé	105	5
USA	Claire Liu	109	6
USA	Hailey Baptiste	115	7
ARG	Julia Riera	116	8

- ^{1} Rankings are as of 12 February 2024.

=== Other entrants ===
The following players received a wildcard into the singles main draw:

- ~~(United States) Amanda Anisimova~~
- (Mexico) Fernanda Contreras Gómez
- (Mexico) María Fernanda Navarro Oliva
- (Australia) Taylah Preston

The following players received entry into the main draw through qualification:

- (United States) Liv Hovde
- (United States) Varvara Lepchenko
- (United States) Robin Montgomery
- Iryna Shymanovich

The following player received entry as a lucky loser:

- (United States) McCartney Kessler

=== Withdrawals ===
- (United States) Amanda Anisimova → replaced by (United States) McCartney Kessler

== Doubles entrants ==
=== Seeds ===
Country	Player	Country	Player	Rank	Seed
	Irina Khromacheva		Yana Sizikova		1
CZE	Miriam Kolodziejová	POL	Katarzyna Piter		2

- Rankings as of 12 February 2024.

== Champions ==
=== Singles ===
- (United States) McCartney Kessler def. (Australia) Taylah Preston 5–7, 6–3, 6–0

=== Doubles ===
- Iryna Shymanovich / (Mexico) Renata Zarazúa def. (Italy) Angelica Moratelli / (Italy) Camilla Rosatello 6–2, 7–6^{(7–1)}
