= 2019 Changsha Open – Singles =

Singles
- 2019 Changsha Open

Final
- Champion: (Serbia) Nina Stojanović
- Runner-up: (Bulgaria) Aleksandrina Naydenova
- Score: 6–1, 6–1

Events
Singles	Doubles
Changsha Open	· 2025 →

This was the first edition of the tournament.

Nina Stojanović won the title, defeating Aleksandrina Naydenova in the final, 6–1, 6–1.

== Seeds ==
1. (Serbia) Nina Stojanović (champion)
2. (China) Han Xinyun (first round)
3. (China) Lu Jiajing (quarterfinals)
4. (Serbia) Natalija Kostić (quarterfinals, retired)
5. (China) Ma Shuyue (first round)
6. (China) Xun Fangying (second round)
7. (China) Yuan Yue (semifinals)
8. (Japan) Chihiro Muramatsu (first round)

== Draw ==
=== Key ===
- Q = Qualifier
- WC = Wild card
- LL = Lucky loser
- Alt = Alternate
- ITF = ITF entry
- PR = Protected ranking
- SR = Special ranking
- SE = Special exempt
- JE = Junior exempt
- JR = Junior Accelerator Programme entrant
- CO = College Accelerator Programme entrant
- NG = Next Gen Accelerator Program entrant
- w/o = Walkover
- r = Retired
- d = Defaulted

=== Finals ===
Semifinals
1	(Serbia) Nina Stojanović	6	6
7	(China) Yuan Yue	3	2
(Bulgaria) Aleksandrina Naydenova	6	6
(China) Guo Hanyu	2	4

Final
1	(Serbia) Nina Stojanović	6	6
(Bulgaria) Aleksandrina Naydenova	1	1

=== Top half ===
First round
1	(Serbia) N Stojanović	6	6
WC	(China) Q Zhao	0	1
(India) R Bhosale	6	3	6
Q	(China) M Guo	4	6	3
Q	(China) C Yuan	6	6
(China) Z Sun	3	4
PR	(China) X Gao	6	6
8	(Japan) C Muramatsu	2	3
4	(Serbia) N Kostić	6	6
Q	(Indonesia) J Rompies	3	3
(Russia) Y Sizikova	6	6
Q	(Croatia) O Oliynykova	3	4
Q	(Russia) A Gabueva	7^{7}	5
(Oman) F Al-Nabhani	6^{4}	4^{r}
WC	(China) Yi Zhang	0	2
7	(China) Y Yuan	6	6

Second round
1	(Serbia) N Stojanović	7^{7}	6
(India) R Bhosale	6^{2}	2
Q	(China) C Yuan	4	3
PR	(China) X Gao	6	6
4	(Serbia) N Kostić	6	6
(Russia) Y Sizikova	3	0
Q	(Russia) A Gabueva	6	2	0
7	(China) Y Yuan	4	6	6

Quarterfinals
1	(Serbia) N Stojanović	6	6
PR	(China) X Gao	1	1
4	(Serbia) N Kostić	1^{r}
7	(China) Y Yuan	3

Semifinals
1	(Serbia) N Stojanović	6	6
7	(China) Y Yuan	3	2

=== Bottom half ===
First round
6	(China) F Xun	6	6
(Georgia (country)) S Shapatava	4	2
Q	(China) W Zheng	6	2	4
(Bulgaria) A Naydenova	1	6	6
WC	(China) S Liu	0	1
WC	(China) S Cao	6	6
(China) X You	2	5
3	(China) Jia Lu	6	7
5	(China) S Ma	5	1
Q	(United States) A Zhu	7	6
(Indonesia) A Sutjiadi	6	4	4
(China) H Guo	3	6	6
(Slovakia) Z Zlochová	6	4	6
(Thailand) P Plipuech	4	6	3
Q	(China) X Sun	0	6	6
2	(China) X Han	6	4	3

Second round
6	(China) F Xun	1	4
(Bulgaria) A Naydenova	6	6
WC	(China) S Cao	2	2
3	(China) Jia Lu	6	6
Q	(United States) A Zhu	6^{6}	7^{7}	2
(China) H Guo	7^{8}	6^{2}	6
(Slovakia) Z Zlochová	7	6
Q	(China) X Sun	5	2

Quarterfinals
(Bulgaria) A Naydenova	6	6
3	(China) Jia Lu	4	3
(China) H Guo	3	7	7
(Slovakia) Z Zlochová	6	5	5

Semifinals
(Bulgaria) A Naydenova	6	6
(China) H Guo	2	4
