= 2025 Open de Limoges =

- Date: 8–14 December
- Edition: 18th
- Category: WTA 125
- Prize money: $115,000
- Surface: Hard (Indoor)
- Location: Limoges, France
- Venue: Palais des Sports de Beaublanc

Champions

Singles
- (Ukraine) Anhelina Kalinina

Doubles
- (Spain) Cristina Bucșa / (China) Zhang Shuai
| ← 2024 · | Open de Limoges | · 2026 → |

The 2025 Open BLS de Limoges was a professional women's tennis tournament played on indoor hard courts. It was the 18th edition of the tournament and part of the 2025 WTA 125 tournaments series, offering a total of $115,000 in prize money. It took place at the Palais des Sports de Beaublanc in Limoges, France, from 8 to 14 December 2025.

== Singles entrants ==
=== Seeds ===
| Country | Player | Rank^{1} | Seed |
|---|---|---|---|
| ESP | Cristina Bucșa | 54 | 1 |
| FRA | Elsa Jacquemot | 59 | 2 |
| CZE | Barbora Krejčíková | 65 | 3 |
| GBR | Sonay Kartal | 69 | 4 |
| USA | Alycia Parks | 71 | 5 |
| CRO | Antonia Ružić | 78 | 6 |
| CHN | Zhang Shuai | 90 | 7 |
| AND | Victoria Jiménez Kasintseva | 110 | 8 |

- ^{1} Rankings as of 1 December 2025.

=== Other entrants ===
The following players received wildcards into the singles main draw:

- (France) Fiona Ferro
- (France) Tiphanie Lemaître
- (France) Chloé Paquet
- (United Kingdom) Mimi Xu

The following player received entry using a protected ranking:

- (France) Océane Dodin

The following players received entry from the qualifying draw:

- (Germany) Mona Barthel
- (Spain) Marina Bassols Ribera
- (Czech Republic) Anna Sisková
- (Netherlands) Eva Vedder

=== Withdrawals ===
Before the tournament

- (Czech Republic) Nikola Bartůňková → replaced by (Liechtenstein) Kathinka von Deichmann
- (Chinese Taipei) Joanna Garland → replaced by Alina Charaeva
- (Austria) Julia Grabher → replaced by (Germany) Tamara Korpatsch
- Polina Kudermetova → replaced by (France) Jessika Ponchet
- (Switzerland) Rebeka Masarova → replaced by (Italy) Jessica Pieri
- (Czech Republic) Dominika Šalková → replaced by (Ukraine) Anhelina Kalinina
- Oksana Selekhmeteva → replaced by (France) Manon Léonard
- (Latvia) Darja Semeņistaja → replaced by (Serbia) Teodora Kostović

== Doubles entrants ==
=== Seeds ===
| Country | Player | Country | Player | Rank^{1} | Seed |
|---|---|---|---|---|---|
| ESP | Cristina Bucșa | CHN | Zhang Shuai | 45 | 1 |
| BEL | Magali Kempen | CZE | Anna Sisková | 127 | 2 |

- ^{1} Rankings as of 1 December 2025.

=== Other entrants ===
The following pair received a wildcard into the doubles main draw:

- (Germany) Anna-Lena Friedsam / (France) Tiantsoa Rakotomanga Rajaonah

== Champions ==
=== Singles ===
- (Ukraine) Anhelina Kalinina def. (France) Elsa Jacquemot 6–3, 4–6, 7–5

=== Doubles ===
- (Spain) Cristina Bucșa / (China) Zhang Shuai def. (France) Elsa Jacquemot / (France) Jessika Ponchet 6–3, 6–1
