= 2019 Changsha Open – Doubles =

Doubles
- 2019 Changsha Open

Final
- Champions: (China) Jiang Xinyu (China) Tang Qianhui
- Runners-up: (India) Rutuja Bhosale (Japan) Erika Sema
- Score: 6–3, 3–6, [11–9]

Events
Singles	Doubles
Changsha Open	· 2025 →

This was the first edition of the tournament.

Jiang Xinyu and Tang Qianhui won the title, defeating Rutuja Bhosale and Erika Sema in the final, 6–3, 3–6, [11–9].

== Seeds ==
1. (China) Jiang Xinyu / (China) Tang Qianhui (champions)
2. (India) Rutuja Bhosale / (Japan) Erika Sema (final)
3. (China) Kang Jiaqi / (Thailand) Peangtarn Plipuech (semifinals)
4. (China) Guo Hanyu / (Indonesia) Aldila Sutjiadi (quarterfinals)

== Draw ==
=== Key ===
- Q = Qualifier
- WC = Wild card
- LL = Lucky loser
- Alt = Alternate
- ITF = ITF entry
- PR = Protected ranking
- SR = Special ranking
- SE = Special exempt
- JE = Junior exempt
- JR = Junior Accelerator Programme entrant
- CO = College Accelerator Programme entrant
- NG = Next Gen Accelerator Program entrant
- w/o = Walkover
- r = Retired
- d = Defaulted

=== Draw ===
First round
1	(China) X Jiang (China) Q Tang	4	6	[10]
(China) X Sun (China) F Xun	6	1	[5]
(China) S Cao (China) M Guo	1
(Japan) A Okuno (Australia) O Tjandramulia	0^{r}
4	(China) H Guo (Indonesia) A Sutjiadi	6	6
(China) X You (China) Yi Zhang	1	2
(Indonesia) J Rompies (India) P Thombare	4	6	[10]
(China) M Wu (China) W Zheng	6	2	[6]
WC	(China) A Chen (China) Y Yang	6	4	[10]
WC	(China) S Guo (China) Q Yang	3	6	[6]
(Hong Kong) K-y Ng (Russia) Y Sizikova	2	7^{7}	[8]
3	(China) J Kang (Thailand) P Plipuech	6	6^{1}	[10]
(Oman) F Al-Nabhani (Russia) A Gabueva	6	6
WC	(China) M Liu (China) S Liu	4	2
(China) Z Sun (China) Q Zhao	4	3
2	(India) R Bhosale (Japan) E Sema	6	6

Quarterfinals
1	(China) X Jiang (China) Q Tang	6	6
(China) S Cao (China) M Guo	4	0
4	(China) H Guo (Indonesia) A Sutjiadi	4	3
(Indonesia) J Rompies (India) P Thombare	6	6
WC	(China) A Chen (China) Y Yang	4	4
3	(China) J Kang (Thailand) P Plipuech	6	6
(Oman) F Al-Nabhani (Russia) A Gabueva
2	(India) R Bhosale (Japan) E Sema	w/o

Semifinals
1	(China) X Jiang (China) Q Tang	7	6
(Indonesia) J Rompies (India) P Thombare	5	4
3	(China) J Kang (Thailand) P Plipuech	6^{4}	2
2	(India) R Bhosale (Japan) E Sema	7^{7}	6

Final
1	(China) X Jiang (China) Q Tang	6	3	[11]
2	(India) R Bhosale (Japan) E Sema	3	6	[9]
