= 2025 Puerto Vallarta Open – Singles =

Singles
- 2025 Puerto Vallarta Open

Final
- Champion: (Romania) Jaqueline Cristian
- Runner-up: (Czech Republic) Linda Fruhvirtová
- Score: 7–5, 6–4

Events
Singles	Doubles
← 2024 ·	Puerto Vallarta Open	· 2026 →

Jaqueline Cristian won the singles title at the 2025 Puerto Vallarta Open, defeating Linda Fruhvirtová in the final, 7–5, 6–4.

McCartney Kessler was the reigning champion, but did not participate this year.

== Seeds ==
1. (Romania) Jaqueline Cristian (champion)
2. (Australia) Maya Joint (quarterfinals)
3. (Italy) Elisabetta Cocciaretto (second round, withdrew)
4. (United States) Bernarda Pera (second round)
5. (Germany) Tatjana Maria (quarterfinals)
6. (Spain) Sara Sorribes Tormo (second round)
7. Erika Andreeva (second round)
8. (United States) Hailey Baptiste (withdrew)

== Draw ==
=== Key ===
- Q = Qualifier
- WC = Wild card
- LL = Lucky loser
- Alt = Alternate
- SE = Special exempt
- PR = Protected ranking
- ITF = ITF entry
- JE = Junior exempt
- w/o = Walkover
- r = Retired
- d = Defaulted
- SR = Special ranking

=== Finals ===
Semifinals
1	(Romania) Jaqueline Cristian	2	6	7^{7}
(Switzerland) Rebeka Masarova	6	3	6^{5}
(United Kingdom) Heather Watson	2	4
WC	(Czech Republic) Linda Fruhvirtová	6	6

Final
1	(Romania) Jaqueline Cristian	7	6
WC	(Czech Republic) Linda Fruhvirtová	5	4

=== Top half ===
First round
1	(Romania) J Cristian	6	6
(United Kingdom) H Dart	3	2
(United States) H Chang	0	3
(Japan) E Shibahara	6	6
(United Kingdom) J Burrage	6	7^{7}
(Canada) R Marino	4	6^{4}
(Italy) L Stefanini	2	2
5	(Germany) T Maria	6	6
4	(United States) B Pera	6	6
WC	(Mexico) F Contreras	1	4
(Switzerland) R Masarova	6	6
(United States) V Lepchenko	3	4
WC	(Australia) M Inglis	6	6
(United Kingdom) E Appleton	1	2
Q	(Mexico) CS Martínez Solís	1	1
7	E Andreeva	6	6

Second round
1	(Romania) J Cristian	3	6	6
(Japan) E Shibahara	6	4	3
(United Kingdom) J Burrage	6	3	2
5	(Germany) T Maria	2	6	6
4	(United States) B Pera	7	3	4
(Switzerland) R Masarova	5	6	6
WC	(Australia) M Inglis	6	6
7	E Andreeva	4	2

Quarterfinals
1	(Romania) J Cristian	6	6
5	(Germany) T Maria	1	1
(Switzerland) R Masarova	6	2	6
WC	(Australia) M Inglis	1	6	2

Semifinals
1	(Romania) J Cristian	2	6	7^{7}
(Switzerland) R Masarova	6	3	6^{5}

=== Bottom half ===
First round
6	(Spain) S Sorribes Tormo	6	6
Q	(Georgia (country)) O Kalashnikova	3	1
(United States) W Osuigwe	0	3
(United Kingdom) H Watson	6	6
(Canada) M Stakusic	6	7
WC	(Croatia) A Konjuh	3	5
Q	(United States) C McHale	3	3
3	(Italy) E Cocciaretto	6	6
8	(United States) H Baptiste
WC	(Czech Republic) L Fruhvirtová	w/o
(Australia) D Saville	4	6	6
(Australia) O Gadecki	6	4	1
(Thailand) M Sawangkaew	3	7	3
Q	(Australia) P Hon	6	5	6
(Canada) C Zhao	3	6	4
2	(Australia) M Joint	6	3	6

Second round
6	(Spain) S Sorribes Tormo	6	4	2
(United Kingdom) H Watson	3	6	6
(Canada) M Stakusic	w/o
3	(Italy) E Cocciaretto
WC	(Czech Republic) L Fruhvirtová	4	6	6
(Australia) D Saville	6	3	4
Q	(Australia) P Hon	4	1
2	(Australia) M Joint	6	6

Quarterfinals
(United Kingdom) H Watson	6	6
(Canada) M Stakusic	3	1
WC	(Czech Republic) L Fruhvirtová	6^{5}	6	6
2	(Australia) M Joint	7^{7}	4	4

Semifinals
(United Kingdom) H Watson	2	4
WC	(Czech Republic) L Fruhvirtová	6	6

== Qualifying ==
=== Qualifiers ===
1. (Australia) Priscilla Hon
2. (United States) Christina McHale
3. (Mexico) Claudia Sofía Martínez Solís
4. (Georgia (country)) Oksana Kalashnikova
