= 2025 Catalonia Open =

- Date: 28 April – 3 May
- Edition: 3rd
- Category: WTA 125
- Draw: 32S / 8D
- Prize money: $115,000
- Surface: Clay
- Location: Vic, Spain
- Venue: Vic Tennis Club

Champions

Singles
- (Hungary) Dalma Gálfi

Doubles
- (Canada) Bianca Andreescu / (Indonesia) Aldila Sutjiadi
- Catalonia Open

The 2025 Catalonia Open was a professional women's tennis tournament played on outdoor clay courts. It was the third edition of the tournament and part of the 2025 WTA 125 tournaments, offering a total of $115,000 in prize money. It took place at the Vic Tennis Club in Vic, Osona, Spain between 28 April and 3 May 2025.

== Singles entrants ==
=== Seeds ===
Country	Player	Rank^{1}	Seed
CAN	Leylah Fernandez	25	1
NZL	Lulu Sun	45	2
CZE	Kateřina Siniaková	57	3
AUS	Kimberly Birrell	61	4
MEX	Renata Zarazúa	67	5
AUS	Maya Joint	78	6
AUS	Ajla Tomljanović	79	7
	Kamilla Rakhimova	83	8

- ^{1} Rankings are as of 21 April 2025.

=== Other entrants ===
The following players received a wildcard into the singles main draw:

- (Spain) Marina Bassols Ribera
- (Spain) Aliona Bolsova

The following players received entry from the qualifying draw:

- (Spain) Lucía Cortez Llorca
- (Serbia) Aleksandra Krunić
- (Spain) Ane Mintegi del Olmo
- (Spain) Ruth Roura Llaverias

== Doubles entrants ==
=== Seeds ===
Country	Player	Country	Player	Rank	Seed
KAZ	Anna Danilina		Irina Khromacheva	32	1
USA	Desirae Krawczyk	MEX	Giuliana Olmos	51	2

- Rankings as of 21 April 2025.

=== Other entrants ===
The following pair received a wildcard into the doubles main draw:

- (Canada) Bianca Andreescu / (Indonesia) Aldila Sutjiadi

== Champions ==
=== Singles ===
- (Hungary) Dalma Gálfi def. (Switzerland) Rebeka Masarova 6–3, 6–0

=== Doubles ===
- (Canada) Bianca Andreescu / (Indonesia) Aldila Sutjiadi def. (Canada) Leylah Fernandez / (New Zealand) Lulu Sun, 6–2, 6–4
