= 2024 Mexico Series Puerto Vallarta 125 – Doubles =

Doubles
- 2024 Mexico Series Puerto Vallarta 125

Final
- Champions: Iryna Shymanovich (Mexico) Renata Zarazúa
- Runners-up: (Italy) Angelica Moratelli (Italy) Camilla Rosatello
- Score: 6–2, 7–6^{(7–1)}

Events
Singles	Doubles
Puerto Vallarta Open	· 2025 →

Iryna Shymanovich and Renata Zarazúa won the title, defeating Angelica Moratelli and Camilla Rosatello in the final, 6–2, 7–6^{(7–1)}

This was the first edition of the tournament as a part of the WTA 125 tournaments.

== Seeds ==
1. Irina Khromacheva / Yana Sizikova (quarterfinals)
2. (Czech Republic) Miriam Kolodziejová / (Poland) Katarzyna Piter (quarterfinals)

== Draw ==
=== Key ===
- Q = Qualifier
- WC = Wild card
- LL = Lucky loser
- Alt = Alternate
- ITF = ITF entry
- PR = Protected ranking
- SR = Special ranking
- SE = Special exempt
- JE = Junior exempt
- JR = Junior Accelerator Programme entrant
- CO = College Accelerator Programme entrant
- NG = Next Gen Accelerator Program entrant
- w/o = Walkover
- r = Retired
- d = Defaulted

=== Draw ===
Quarterfinals
1	I Khromacheva; Y Sizikova	4	4
I Shymanovich (Mexico) R Zarazúa	6	6
(France) E Lechemia (Czech Republic) A Sisková	6	6
WC	(Mexico) F Contreras Gómez (Mexico) M Navarro Oliva	2	3
(Belgium) Y Wickmayer (Belgium) K Zimmermann	6	7
(United Kingdom) M Lumsden (United States) S Santamaria	4	5
(Italy) A Moratelli (Italy) C Rosatello	6	6
2	(Czech Republic) M Kolodziejová (Poland) K Piter	3	3

Semifinals
I Shymanovich (Mexico) R Zarazúa	6	3	[10]
(France) E Lechemia (Czech Republic) A Sisková	2	6	[6]
(Belgium) Y Wickmayer (Belgium) K Zimmermann	5	6^{6}
(Italy) A Moratelli (Italy) C Rosatello	7	7^{8}

Final
I Shymanovich (Mexico) R Zarazúa	6	7^{7}
(Italy) A Moratelli (Italy) C Rosatello	2	6^{1}
