= 2025 Puerto Vallarta Open – Doubles =

Doubles
- 2025 Puerto Vallarta Open

Final
- Champions: (United States) Hanna Chang (United States) Christina McHale
- Runners-up: (Australia) Maya Joint (Japan) Ena Shibahara
- Score: 2–6, 6–2, [10–7]

Events
Singles	Doubles
← 2024 ·	Puerto Vallarta Open	· 2026 →

Iryna Shymanovich and Renata Zarazúa were the reigning champions, but did not participate this year.

Hanna Chang and Christina McHale won the title, defeating Maya Joint and Ena Shibahara in the final, 2–6, 6–2, [10–7].

== Seeds ==
1. (United Kingdom) Harriet Dart / (Romania) Monica Niculescu (quarterfinals)
2. (Poland) Katarzyna Piter / (United Kingdom) Heather Watson (quarterfinals)

== Draw ==
=== Key ===
- Q = Qualifier
- WC = Wild card
- LL = Lucky loser
- Alt = Alternate
- SE = Special exempt
- PR = Protected ranking
- ITF = ITF entry
- JE = Junior exempt
- w/o = Walkover
- r = Retired
- d = Defaulted
- SR = Special ranking

=== Draw ===
Quarterfinals
1	(United Kingdom) H Dart (Romania) M Niculescu	6^{5}	2
(Australia) M Joint (Japan) E Shibahara	7^{7}	6
(Georgia (country)) O Kalashnikova (United States) A Kulikov	6	6
(Croatia) A Konjuh (United States) B Pera	4	3
(Brazil) I Martins (United States) S Santamaria	3	0
(United Kingdom) E Appleton (United States) Q Gleason	6	6
(United States) H Chang (United States) C McHale	6	6
2	(Poland) K Piter (United Kingdom) H Watson	1	4

Semifinals
(Australia) M Joint (Japan) E Shibahara	6	7^{7}
(Georgia (country)) O Kalashnikova (United States) A Kulikov	3	6^{2}
(United Kingdom) E Appleton (United States) Q Gleason	6	3	[8]
(United States) H Chang (United States) C McHale	0	6	[10]

Final
(Australia) M Joint (Japan) E Shibahara	6	2	[7]
(United States) H Chang (United States) C McHale	2	6	[10]
