= 2025 Open de Limoges – Singles =

Singles
- 2025 Open de Limoges

Final
- Champion: (Ukraine) Anhelina Kalinina
- Runner-up: (France) Elsa Jacquemot
- Score: 6–3, 4–6, 7–5

Details
- Draw: 32 (4 Q / 5 WC)
- Seeds: 8

Events
Singles	Doubles
- Open de Limoges

Viktorija Golubic was the reigning champion, but did not participate this year.

Anhelina Kalinina won the title at the 2025 Open de Limoges, defeating Elsa Jacquemot in the final, 6–3, 4–6, 7–5. It was her second WTA 125 title, and second at the tournament after 2022.

== Seeds ==
1. (Spain) Cristina Bucșa (semifinals)
2. (France) Elsa Jacquemot (final)
3. (Czech Republic) Barbora Krejčíková (first round, retired)
4. (United Kingdom) Sonay Kartal (second round)
5. (United States) Alycia Parks (quarterfinals)
6. (Croatia) Antonia Ružić (quarterfinals)
7. (China) Zhang Shuai (second round)
8. (Andorra) Victoria Jiménez Kasintseva (first round)

== Draw ==
Key

- Q = Qualifier
- WC = Wild card
- LL = Lucky loser
- Alt = Alternate
- ITF = ITF entry
- PR = Protected ranking
- SR = Special ranking
- SE = Special exempt
- JE = Junior exempt
- JR = Junior Accelerator Programme entrant
- CO = College Accelerator Programme entrant
- NG = Next Gen Accelerator Program entrant
- w/o = Walkover
- r = Retired
- d = Defaulted

=== Finals ===
Semifinals
1	(Spain) Cristina Bucșa	4	3
(Ukraine) Anhelina Kalinina	6	6
(Germany) Anna-Lena Friedsam	2	6	5
2	(France) Elsa Jacquemot	6	2	7

Final
(Ukraine) Anhelina Kalinina	6	4	7
2	(France) Elsa Jacquemot	3	6	5

=== Top half ===
First round
1	(Spain) C Bucșa	6	6
(Serbia) T Kostović	4	0
WC	(France) T Lemaître	7^{7}	6
PR	(France) O Dodin	6^{4}	2
WC	(United Kingdom) M Xu	3	3
(Poland) L Klimovičová	6	6
(Germany) T Korpatsch	4	6	4
6	(Croatia) A Ružić	6	3	6
4	(United Kingdom) S Kartal	6	6
(Italy) J Pieri	1	0
(Ukraine) A Kalinina	6	6
(Liechtenstein) K von Deichmann	2	2
Q	(Germany) M Barthel	4	6	2
WC	(France) F Ferro	6	1	6
Q	(Netherlands) E Vedder	5	3
5	(United States) A Parks	7	6

Second round
1	(Spain) C Bucșa	6	6
WC	(France) T Lemaître	2	2
(Poland) L Klimovičová	1	2
6	(Croatia) A Ružić	6	6
4	(United Kingdom) S Kartal	6^{4}	6	1
(Ukraine) A Kalinina	7^{7}	1	6
WC	(France) F Ferro	2	5
5	(United States) A Parks	6	7

Quarterfinals
1	(Spain) C Bucșa	6	6
6	(Croatia) A Ružić	1	0
(Ukraine) A Kalinina	7	1	6
5	(United States) A Parks	5	6	3

Semifinals
1	(Spain) C Bucșa	4	3
(Ukraine) A Kalinina	6	6

=== Bottom half ===
First round
7	(China) S Zhang	6	6
(Italy) L Stefanini	2	2
(Germany) A-L Friedsam	6	6
(Poland) K Kawa	3	2
(France) T Rakotomanga Rajaonah	6	6
(France) J Ponchet	4	2
(Latvia) A Sevastova	6	3	1
3	(Czech Republic) B Krejčíková	4	6	0^{r}
8	(Andorra) V Jiménez Kasintseva	7	2	2
Q	(Czech Republic) A Sisková	5	6	6
Q	(Spain) M Bassols Ribera	5	4
(France) M Léonard	7	6
(Czech Republic) G Knutson	2	7^{7}	6
A Charaeva	6	6^{3}	4
WC	(France) C Paquet	6^{5}	4
2	(France) E Jacquemot	7^{7}	6

Second round
7	(China) S Zhang	3	6	1
(Germany) A-L Friedsam	6	3	6
(France) T Rakotomanga Rajaonah	7	4	6
(Latvia) A Sevastova	5	6	3
Q	(Czech Republic) A Sisková	6	6
(France) M Léonard	3	1
(Czech Republic) G Knutson	3	2
2	(France) E Jacquemot	6	6

Quarterfinals
(Germany) A-L Friedsam	1	7^{7}	6
(France) T Rakotomanga Rajaonah	6	6^{4}	1
Q	(Czech Republic) A Sisková	6	3	4
2	(France) E Jacquemot	3	6	6

Semifinals
(Germany) A-L Friedsam	2	6	5
2	(France) E Jacquemot	6	2	7

== Qualifying ==
=== Seeds ===
1. (Germany) Mona Barthel (qualified)
2. (Netherlands) Eva Vedder (qualified)
3. (Italy) Jessica Pieri (moved to main draw)
4. (Spain) Aliona Bolsova (qualifying competition)

=== Qualifiers ===
1. (Germany) Mona Barthel
2. (Netherlands) Eva Vedder
3. (Spain) Marina Bassols Ribera
4. (Czech Republic) Anna Sisková

=== Qualifying draw ===
==== First qualifier ====
Qualifying competition
1	(Germany) Mona Barthel	6	6
WC	(France) Diana Martynov	3	4

==== Second qualifier ====
Qualifying competition
2	(Netherlands) Eva Vedder	6	6
WC	(France) Astrid Lew Yan Foon	3	3

==== Third qualifier ====
Qualifying competition
Alt	(Ukraine) Veronika Podrez	0	2
	(Spain) Marina Bassols Ribera	6	6

==== Fourth qualifier ====
Qualifying competition
4	(Spain) Aliona Bolsova	3	1
	(Czech Republic) Anna Sisková	6	6
