= 2025 Changsha Open – Doubles =

Doubles
- 2025 Changsha Open

Final
- Champions: (Hong Kong) Eudice Chong (Chinese Taipei) Liang En-shuo
- Runners-up: (Chinese Taipei) Li Yu-yun (China) Yao Xinxin
- Score: 7–5, 6–3

Events
Singles	Doubles
← 2019 ·	Changsha Open	· 2026 →

Eudice Chong and Liang En-shuo won the title, after defeating Li Yu-yun and Yao Xinxin 7–5, 6–3 in the final.

Jiang Xinyu and Tang Qianhui were the reigning champions from when the tournament was last held in 2019, but Jiang did not participate and Tang chose to compete in Guadalajara instead.

== Seeds ==
1. (Chinese Taipei) Cho I-hsuan / (Chinese Taipei) Cho Yi-tsen (first round)
2. (France) Estelle Cascino / (China) Feng Shuo (quarterfinals)
3. (Argentina) María Lourdes Carlé / (Slovenia) Veronika Erjavec (quarterfinals, withdrew)
4. (Hong Kong) Eudice Chong / (Chinese Taipei) Liang En-shuo (champions)

== Draw ==
=== Key ===
- Q = Qualifier
- WC = Wild card
- LL = Lucky loser
- Alt = Alternate
- ITF = ITF entry
- PR = Protected ranking
- SR = Special ranking
- SE = Special exempt
- JE = Junior exempt
- JR = Junior Accelerator Programme entrant
- CO = College Accelerator Programme entrant
- NG = Next Gen Accelerator Program entrant
- w/o = Walkover
- r = Retired
- d = Defaulted

=== Draw ===
First round
1	(Chinese Taipei) I-h Cho (Chinese Taipei) Y-t Cho	4	7^{7}	[8]
(Thailand) P Plipuech (China) W Zheng	6	6^{5}	[10]
(France) C Monnet (China) S Wei	7	6
(South Korea) N-r Kim (China) Q Ye	5	0
4	(Hong Kong) E Chong (Chinese Taipei) E-s Liang	0	6	[10]
A Charaeva (Cyprus) R Șerban	6	4	[7]
(China) Z Li (China) H Shi	1	7	[4]
(Kazakhstan) Z Kulambayeva (South Korea) S-h Park	6	5	[10]
(Chinese Taipei) Y-y Li (China) X Yao	6	6
WC	(China) M Wang (China) Y Yang	2	4
(United States) H Chang (China) X You	2	6^{5}
3	(Argentina) ML Carlé (Slovenia) V Erjavec	6	7^{7}
(Germany) A-L Friedsam (Thailand) L Tararudee	6	5	[10]
E Reyngold; M Timofeeva	4	7	[5]
(China) Z Xiao (China) C Yuan	7	1	[6]
2	(France) E Cascino (China) S Feng	5	6	[10]

Quarterfinals
(Thailand) P Plipuech (China) W Zheng	6	6
(France) C Monnet (China) S Wei	3	3
4	(Hong Kong) E Chong (Chinese Taipei) E-s Liang	6	6
(Kazakhstan) Z Kulambayeva (South Korea) S-h Park	2	4
(Chinese Taipei) Y-y Li (China) X Yao	w/o
3	(Argentina) ML Carlé (Slovenia) V Erjavec
(Germany) A-L Friedsam (Thailand) L Tararudee	6	6
2	(France) E Cascino (China) S Feng	1	4

Semifinals
(Thailand) P Plipuech (China) W Zheng	2	6	[7]
4	(Hong Kong) E Chong (Chinese Taipei) E-s Liang	6	4	[10]
(Chinese Taipei) Y-y Li (China) X Yao	7	7
(Germany) A-L Friedsam (Thailand) L Tararudee	5	5

Final
4	(Hong Kong) E Chong (Chinese Taipei) E-s Liang	7	6
(Chinese Taipei) Y-y Li (China) X Yao	5	3
