= 2025 Open de Limoges – Doubles =

Doubles
- 2025 Open de Limoges

Final
- Champions: (Spain) Cristina Bucșa (China) Zhang Shuai
- Runners-up: (France) Elsa Jacquemot (France) Jessika Ponchet
- Score: 6–3, 6–1

Details
- Draw: 8 (1 WC)
- Seeds: 2

Events
Singles	Doubles
← 2024 ·	Open de Limoges	· 2026 →

Elsa Jacquemot and Margaux Rouvroy were the reigning champions, but Rouvroy did not participate this year.

Cristina Bucșa and Zhang Shuai won the title, defeating Jacquemot and Jessika Ponchet in the final, 6–3, 6–1.

== Seeds ==
1. (Spain) Cristina Bucșa / (China) Zhang Shuai (champions)
2. (Belgium) Magali Kempen / (Czech Republic) Anna Sisková (quarterfinals)

== Draw ==
Key

- Q = Qualifier
- WC = Wild card
- LL = Lucky loser
- Alt = Alternate
- ITF = ITF entry
- PR = Protected ranking
- SR = Special ranking
- SE = Special exempt
- JE = Junior exempt
- JR = Junior Accelerator Programme entrant
- CO = College Accelerator Programme entrant
- NG = Next Gen Accelerator Program entrant
- w/o = Walkover
- r = Retired
- d = Defaulted

=== Draw ===
Quarterfinals
1	(Spain) C Bucșa (China) S Zhang	6	3	[10]
(Spain) Y Cavallé Reimers (Italy) A Moratelli	4	6	[7]
WC	(Germany) A-L Friedsam (France) T Rakotomanga Rajaonah	2	2
(Netherlands) I Haverlag (United Kingdom) M Lumsden	6	6
(Czech Republic) J Malečková (Slovenia) N Radišić	7^{7}	6
(Spain) A Bolsova (Germany) T Korpatsch	6^{5}	4
(France) E Jacquemot (France) J Ponchet	7^{7}	6
2	(Belgium) M Kempen (Czech Republic) A Sisková	6^{4}	3

Semifinals
1	(Spain) C Bucșa (China) S Zhang	6^{5}	6	[10]
(Netherlands) I Haverlag (United Kingdom) M Lumsden	7^{7}	1	[3]
(Czech Republic) J Malečková (Slovenia) N Radišić	1	6^{4}
(France) E Jacquemot (France) J Ponchet	6	7^{7}

Final
1	(Spain) C Bucșa (China) S Zhang	6	6
(France) E Jacquemot (France) J Ponchet	3	1
