= 2025 Catalonia Open – Doubles =

Doubles
- 2025 Catalonia Open

Final
- Champions: (Canada) Bianca Andreescu (Indonesia) Aldila Sutjiadi
- Runners-up: (Canada) Leylah Fernandez (New Zealand) Lulu Sun
- Score: 6–2, 6–4

Details
- Draw: 8
- Seeds: 2

Events
Singles	Doubles
- Catalonia Open

Bianca Andreescu and Aldila Sutjiadi won the doubles title at the 2025 Catalonia Open, defeating Leylah Fernandez and Lulu Sun in the final, 6–2, 6–4.

Nicole Melichar-Martinez and Ellen Perez were the reigning champions, but did not participate this year.

== Seeds ==
1. (Kazakhstan) Anna Danilina / Irina Khromacheva (semifinals)
2. (United States) Desirae Krawczyk / (Mexico) Giuliana Olmos (quarterfinals)

== Draw ==
Key

- Q = Qualifier
- WC = Wild card
- LL = Lucky loser
- Alt = Alternate
- ITF = ITF entry
- PR = Protected ranking
- SR = Special ranking
- SE = Special exempt
- JE = Junior exempt
- JR = Junior Accelerator Programme entrant
- CO = College Accelerator Programme entrant
- NG = Next Gen Accelerator Program entrant
- w/o = Walkover
- r = Retired
- d = Defaulted

=== Draw ===
Quarterfinals
1	(Kazakhstan) A Danilina; I Khromacheva	6	6
(Japan) S Aoyama (United States) S Santamaria	3	4
WC	(Canada) B Andreescu (Indonesia) A Sutjiadi	6	6
(Slovakia) T Mihalíková (United Kingdom) O Nicholls	1	3
(Canada) L Fernandez (New Zealand) L Sun	7^{7}	6
(Spain) A Bolsova (Spain) Y Cavallé Reimers	6^{4}	3
(Brazil) I Martins (Mexico) R Zarazúa	6	6
2	(United States) D Krawczyk (Mexico) G Olmos	4	4

Semifinals
1	(Kazakhstan) A Danilina; I Khromacheva	6^{4}	6	[5]
WC	(Canada) B Andreescu (Indonesia) A Sutjiadi	7^{7}	4	[10]
(Canada) L Fernandez (New Zealand) L Sun	6	6
(Brazil) I Martins (Mexico) R Zarazúa	1	0

Final
WC	(Canada) B Andreescu (Indonesia) A Sutjiadi	6	6
(Canada) L Fernandez (New Zealand) L Sun	2	4
