= Changsha Open =

Tennis tournament in China

WTA 125
- Event name: Changsha Open
- Location: Changsha, China
- Venue: Roland Garros Red Clay Tennis Park Moon Island
- Category: WTA 125
- Surface: Clay
- Draw: 32S/16Q/16D
- Prize money: $115,000

Current champions (2025)
- Singles: (Slovenia) Veronika Erjavec
- Doubles: (Hong Kong) Eudice Chong (Chinese Taipei) Liang En-shuo

The Changsha Open (Chinese: 长沙网球公开赛; pinyin: Zhǎngshā Wǎngqiú Gōngkāi Sài) is a tournament for professional female tennis players played on outdoor clay courts. The event is classified as a WTA 125 tournament and is held in Changsha, China.

== Past finals ==
=== Singles ===
Year	Champion	Runners-up	Score
2019	(Serbia) Nina Stojanović	(Bulgaria) Aleksandrina Naydenova	6–1, 6–1
2020-24	Not held		
↓ WTA 125 event ↓
2025	(Slovenia) Veronika Erjavec	Maria Timofeeva	6–1, 6–2
2026	Not held		

=== Doubles ===
Year	Champions	Runners-up	Score
2019	(China) Jiang Xinyu (China) Tang Qianhui	(India) Rutuja Bhosale (Japan) Erika Sema	6–3, 3–6, [11–9]
2020-24	Not held		
↓ WTA 125 event ↓
2025	(Hong Kong) Eudice Chong (Chinese Taipei) Liang En-shuo	(Chinese Taipei) Li Yu-yun (China) Yao Xinxin	7–5, 6–3
2026	Not held		
