= 2024 Mexico Series Puerto Vallarta 125 – Singles =

Singles
- 2024 Mexico Series Puerto Vallarta 125

Final
- Champion: (United States) McCartney Kessler
- Runner-up: (Australia) Taylah Preston
- Score: 5–7, 6–3, 6–0

Details
- Draw: 32 (4 WC)
- Seeds: 8

Events
Singles	Doubles
Puerto Vallarta Open	· 2025 →

McCartney Kessler won her first WTA 125 title, defeating Taylah Preston in the final, 5–7, 6–3, 6–0.

This was the first edition of the tournament as a part of the WTA 125 tournaments.

== Seeds ==
1. (Slovakia) Anna Karolína Schmiedlová (first round)
2. (Belgium) Yanina Wickmayer (first round)
3. (United States) Taylor Townsend (first round)
4. (Mexico) Renata Zarazúa (second round)
5. (Argentina) María Lourdes Carlé (semifinals)
6. (United States) Claire Liu (second round)
7. (United States) Hailey Baptiste (semifinals)
8. (Argentina) Julia Riera (second round)

== Draw ==
=== Key ===
- Q = Qualifier
- WC = Wild card
- LL = Lucky loser
- Alt = Alternate
- SE = Special exempt
- PR = Protected ranking
- ITF = ITF entry
- JE = Junior exempt
- w/o = Walkover
- r = Retired
- d = Defaulted
- SR = Special ranking

=== Finals ===
Semifinals
WC	(Australia) Taylah Preston	6	6
5	(Argentina) María Lourdes Carlé	2	2
7	(United States) Hailey Baptiste	4	4
LL	(United States) McCartney Kessler	6	6

Final
WC	(Australia) Taylah Preston	7	3	0
LL	(United States) McCartney Kessler	5	6	6

=== Top half ===
First round
1	(Slovakia) AK Schmiedlová	2	0
(United States) S Vickery	6	6
(Colombia) E Arango	5	1
(Ukraine) Y Starodubtseva	7	6
WC	(Australia) T Preston	6	6
(Spain) N Párrizas Díaz	4	1
(United States) A Li	6	5	0^{r}
8	(Argentina) J Riera	3	7	1
3	(United States) T Townsend	3	4
(Spain) J Bouzas Maneiro	6	6
(Czech Republic) L Fruhvirtová	6	7
Q	(United States) L Hovde	3	5
(United States) C McNally	6	6
(Germany) J Niemeier	4	3
(France) C Paquet	3	2
5	(Argentina) ML Carlé	6	6

Second round
(United States) S Vickery	3	5
(Ukraine) Y Starodubtseva	6	7
WC	(Australia) T Preston	2	7	6
8	(Argentina) J Riera	6	5	4
(Spain) J Bouzas Maneiro	6	6
(Czech Republic) L Fruhvirtová	4	4
(United States) C McNally	6	2	3
5	(Argentina) ML Carlé	0	6	6

Quarterfinals
(Ukraine) Y Starodubtseva	5	4
WC	(Australia) T Preston	7	6
(Spain) J Bouzas Maneiro	6	4	2
5	(Argentina) ML Carlé	4	6	6

Semifinals
WC	(Australia) T Preston	6	6
5	(Argentina) ML Carlé	2	2

=== Bottom half ===
First round
7	(United States) H Baptiste	6	6
(Argentina) M Capurro Taborda	1	3
(France) C Monnet	7^{8}	4	5
Q	I Shymanovich	6^{6}	6	7
Q	(United States) R Montgomery	6	7
(Argentina) S Sierra	1	5
WC	(Mexico) F Contreras Gómez	3	4
4	(Mexico) R Zarazúa	6	6
6	(United States) C Liu	6	1	7
Q	(United States) V Lepchenko	3	6	5
LL	(United States) M Kessler	6	6
(Serbia) N Stevanović	3	1
WC	(Mexico) M Navarro Oliva	4	2
(Canada) R Marino	6	6
(France) L Jeanjean	6	7
2	(Belgium) Y Wickmayer	0	5

Second round
7	(United States) H Baptiste	6	6
Q	I Shymanovich	0	1
Q	(United States) R Montgomery	6	6
4	(Mexico) R Zarazúa	1	4
6	(United States) C Liu	4	3
LL	(United States) M Kessler	6	6
(Canada) R Marino	3	6	2
(France) L Jeanjean	6	4	6

Quarterfinals
7	(United States) H Baptiste	4	6	6
Q	(United States) R Montgomery	6	1	2
LL	(United States) M Kessler	6	6
(France) L Jeanjean	2	1

Semifinals
7	(United States) H Baptiste	4	4
LL	(United States) M Kessler	6	6

== Qualifying ==
=== Seeds ===
1. (United States) McCartney Kessler (qualifying competition, lucky loser)
2. Iryna Shymanovich (qualified)
3. (United States) Robin Montgomery (qualified)
4. (Canada) Carol Zhao (qualifying competition)

=== Qualifiers ===
1. (United States) Liv Hovde
2. Iryna Shymanovich
3. (United States) Robin Montgomery
4. (United States) Varvara Lepchenko

=== Lucky loser ===
1. (United States) McCartney Kessler

=== Draw ===
==== First qualifier ====
Qualifying competition
1	(United States) McCartney Kessler	4	6	1
WC	(United States) Liv Hovde	6	4	6

==== Second qualifier ====
Qualifying competition
2	Iryna Shymanovich	5	6	4
WC	(Mexico) Jessica Hinojosa Gómez	7	2	0^{r}

==== Third qualifier ====
Qualifying competition
3	(United States) Robin Montgomery	6	6
	(United States) Elvina Kalieva	2	4

==== Fourth qualifier ====
Qualifying competition
4	(Canada) Carol Zhao	2	4
Alt	(United States) Varvara Lepchenko	6	6
