= 2025 Catalonia Open – Singles =

Singles
- 2025 Catalonia Open

Final
- Champion: (Hungary) Dalma Gálfi
- Runner-up: (Switzerland) Rebeka Masarova
- Score: 6–3, 6–0

Details
- Draw: 32
- Seeds: 8

Events
Singles	Doubles
- Catalonia Open

Dalma Gálfi won the singles title at the 2025 Catalonia Open, defeating Rebeka Masarova in the final, 6–3, 6–0.

Kateřina Siniaková was the defending champion, but lost in the quarterfinals to Masarova.

== Seeds ==
1. (Canada) Leylah Fernandez (second round)
2. (New Zealand) Lulu Sun (second round)
3. (Czech Republic) Kateřina Siniaková (quarterfinals)
4. (Australia) Kimberly Birrell (second round)
5. (Mexico) Renata Zarazúa (second round)
6. (Australia) Maya Joint (first round)
7. (Australia) Ajla Tomljanović (first round)
8. Kamilla Rakhimova (second round)

== Draw ==
Key

- Q = Qualifier
- WC = Wild card
- LL = Lucky loser
- Alt = Alternate
- ITF = ITF entry
- PR = Protected ranking
- SR = Special ranking
- SE = Special exempt
- JE = Junior exempt
- JR = Junior Accelerator Programme entrant
- CO = College Accelerator Programme entrant
- NG = Next Gen Accelerator Program entrant
- w/o = Walkover
- r = Retired
- d = Defaulted

=== Finals ===
Semifinals
Aliaksandra Sasnovich	6	1	3
(Switzerland) Rebeka Masarova	2	6	6
(Hungary) Dalma Gálfi	6	6
Oksana Selekhmeteva	3	1

Final
(Switzerland) Rebeka Masarova	3	0
(Hungary) Dalma Gálfi	6	6

=== Top half ===
First round
1	(Canada) L Fernandez	6	6
Q	(Spain) L Cortez Llorca	1	2
A Sasnovich	6^{4}	6	7^{7}
(Colombia) E Arango	7^{7}	3	6^{5}
(Italy) E Cocciaretto	2	7^{7}	6
(Germany) J Niemeier	6	6^{5}	3
(Spain) C Martínez Círez	6	7^{7}
7	(Australia) A Tomljanović	4	6^{2}
3	(Czech Republic) K Siniaková	7	6
(Spain) A Lázaro García	5	2
(Australia) S Hunter	6	2	5
Q	(Spain) R Roura Llaverias	2	6	7
(Netherlands) A Rus	3	4
(Switzerland) R Masarova	6	6
(Spain) I Burillo Escorihuela	0	2
5	(Mexico) R Zarazúa	6	6

Second round
1	(Canada) L Fernandez	4	6	2
A Sasnovich	6	2	6
(Italy) E Cocciaretto	1	3
(Spain) C Martínez Círez	6	6
3	(Czech Republic) K Siniaková	6	6
Q	(Spain) R Roura Llaverias	1	1
(Switzerland) R Masarova	3	6	6
5	(Mexico) R Zarazúa	6	3	4

Quarterfinals
A Sasnovich	6	7
(Spain) C Martínez Círez	3	5
3	(Czech Republic) K Siniaková	3	4
(Switzerland) R Masarova	6	6

Semifinals
A Sasnovich	6	1	3
(Switzerland) R Masarova	2	6	6

=== Bottom half ===
First round
8	K Rakhimova	6	6
WC	(Spain) M Bassols Ribera	4	0
(Australia) D Saville	2	3
(Spain) G Maristany	6	6
(China) Xiy Wang	3	2
(Hungary) D Gálfi	6	6
(Canada) B Andreescu	2	2
4	(Australia) K Birrell	6	6
6	(Australia) M Joint	6^{7}	3
WC	(Spain) A Bolsova	7^{9}	6
Q	(Serbia) A Krunić	6^{3}	5
(Italy) L Stefanini	7^{7}	7
(United States) L Chirico	1	2
O Selekhmeteva	6	6
Q	(Spain) A Mintegi del Olmo	4	4
2	(New Zealand) L Sun	6	6

Second round
8	K Rakhimova	1	6	2
(Spain) G Maristany	6	2	6
(Hungary) D Gálfi	6	6
4	(Australia) K Birrell	2	1
WC	(Spain) A Bolsova	6	6
(Italy) L Stefanini	4	3
O Selekhmeteva	6	6
2	(New Zealand) L Sun	0	2

Quarterfinals
(Spain) G Maristany	2	4
(Hungary) D Gálfi	6	6
WC	(Spain) A Bolsova	2	0
O Selekhmeteva	6	6

Semifinals
(Hungary) D Gálfi	6	6
O Selekhmeteva	3	1

== Qualifying ==
=== Seeds ===
1. (Serbia) Aleksandra Krunić (qualified)
2. (Spain) Lucía Cortez Llorca (qualified)
3. (Spain) Ruth Roura Llaverias (qualified)
4. (Spain) Ane Mintegi del Olmo (qualified)

=== Qualifiers ===
1. (Serbia) Aleksandra Krunić
2. (Spain) Lucía Cortez Llorca
3. (Spain) Ruth Roura Llaverias
4. (Spain) Ane Mintegi del Olmo

=== Qualifying draw ===
==== First qualifier ====
Qualifying competition
1	(Serbia) Aleksandra Krunić
	Bye

==== Second qualifier ====
Qualifying competition
2	(Spain) Lucía Cortez Llorca	6	6
WC	(Spain) Alba Sallés Canuda	1	2

==== Third qualifier ====
Qualifying competition
3	(Spain) Ruth Roura Llaverias	6	6
WC	(Spain) Yvonne Cavallé Reimers	2	1

==== Fourth qualifier ====
Qualifying competition
4	(Spain) Ane Mintegi del Olmo	6	6
WC	(Spain) Naroa Aranzábal	0	1
