= 2025 Puerto Vallarta Open =

Women's tennis tournament

- Date: 24–30 March
- Edition: 2nd
- Category: WTA 125
- Draw: 32S / 8D
- Prize money: $115,000
- Surface: Hard
- Location: Puerto Vallarta, Mexico
- Venue: Sheraton Buganvilias Resort and Convention Center

Champions

Singles
- (Romania) Jaqueline Cristian

Doubles
- (United States) Hanna Chang / (United States) Christina McHale
- Puerto Vallarta Open

The 2025 Puerto Vallarta Open was a professional women's tennis tournament played on outdoor hardcourts. It was the second edition of the tournament and part of the 2025 WTA 125 tournaments, offering a total of $115,000 in prize money. It took place at the Sheraton Buganvilias in Puerto Vallarta, Mexico between 24 and 30 March 2025.

== Singles entrants ==
=== Seeds ===
Country	Player	Rank^{1}	Seed
ROU	Jaqueline Cristian	72	1
AUS	Maya Joint	80	2
ITA	Elisabetta Cocciaretto	82	3
USA	Bernarda Pera	84	4
GER	Tatjana Maria	86	5
ESP	Sara Sorribes Tormo	87	6
	Erika Andreeva	95	7
USA	Hailey Baptiste	98	8

- ^{1} Rankings are as of 17 March 2025.

=== Other entrants ===
The following players received a wildcard into the singles main draw:

- (Mexico) Fernanda Contreras
- (Czech Republic) Linda Fruhvirtová
- (Australia) Maddison Inglis
- (Croatia) Ana Konjuh

The following players received entry from the qualifying draw:

- (Australia) Priscilla Hon
- (Georgia (country)) Oksana Kalashnikova
- (Mexico) Claudia Sofía Martínez Solís
- (United States) Christina McHale

=== Withdrawals ===
During the tournament

- (United States) Hailey Baptiste (left foot injury)
- (Italy) Elisabetta Cocciaretto (lower back injury)

== Doubles entrants ==
=== Seeds ===
Country	Player	Country	Player	Rank	Seed
GBR	Harriet Dart	ROU	Monica Niculescu	99	1
POL	Katarzyna Piter	GBR	Heather Watson	145	2

- Rankings as of 17 March 2025.

== Champions ==
=== Singles ===
- (Romania) Jaqueline Cristian def. (Czech Republic) Linda Fruhvirtová, 7–5, 6–4

=== Doubles ===
- (United States) Hanna Chang / (United States) Christina McHale vs. (Australia) Maya Joint / (Japan) Ena Shibahara, 2–6, 6–2, [10–7]
