= 2025 Changsha Open =

Tennis tournament

- Date: 1–6 September 2025
- Edition: 2nd
- Category: WTA 125 tournaments
- Prize money: $115,000
- Surface: Clay
- Location: Changsha, China

Champions

Singles
- (Slovenia) Veronika Erjavec

Doubles
- (Hong Kong) Eudice Chong / (Chinese Taipei) Liang En-shuo
- Changsha Open

The 2025 Changsha Open was a professional tennis tournament played on outdoor clay courts. It was the second edition of the tournament (the first since 2019), and part of the 2025 WTA 125 tournaments (upgraded from ITF status for the first edition). It took place in Changsha, China between 1 and 7 September 2025.

== Singles main-draw entrants ==
=== Seeds ===
Country	Player	Rank^{1}	Seed
ARG	María Lourdes Carlé	125	1
TPE	Joanna Garland	136	2
SLO	Veronika Erjavec	138	3
CHN	Gao Xinyu	142	4
THA	Lanlana Tararudee	154	5
JPN	Mai Hontama	180	6
CHN	Wei Sijia	189	7
	Maria Timofeeva	191	8

- ^{1} Rankings are as of 25 August 2025.

=== Other entrants ===
The following players received wildcards into the singles main draw:

- (China) Ren Yufei
- (China) Yang Yidi
- (China) You Xiaodi
- (China) Zhang Ying

The following players received entry from the qualifying draw:

- (China) Guo Meiqi
- Daria Kudashova
- (Italy) Jessica Pieri
- Ekaterina Reyngold

=== Withdrawals ===
- (Japan) Nao Hibino → replaced by (China) Zheng Wushuang
- (Spain) Nuria Párrizas Díaz → replaced by (Japan) Sara Saito
- (Japan) Himeno Sakatsume → replaced by (China) Shi Han
- (New Zealand) Lulu Sun → replaced by (Chinese Taipei) Liang En-shuo
- (Japan) Moyuka Uchijima → replaced by (China) Yao Xinxin
- (Netherlands) Eva Vedder → replaced by (Kazakhstan) Zarina Diyas
- (China) Wang Xiyu → replaced by (Kazakhstan) Zhibek Kulambayeva

== Doubles entrants ==
=== Seeds ===
Country	Player	Country	Player	Rank	Seed
TPE	Cho I-hsuan	TPE	Cho Yi-tsen	236	1
FRA	Estelle Cascino	CHN	Feng Shuo	248	2
ARG	María Lourdes Carlé	SLO	Veronika Erjavec	272	3
HKG	Eudice Chong	TPE	Liang En-shuo	277	4

- Rankings as of 25 August 2025.

=== Other entrants ===
The following pair received a wildcard into the doubles main draw:

- (China) Wang Meiling / (China) Yang Yidi

== Champions ==
=== Singles ===
- (Slovenia) Veronika Erjavec def. Maria Timofeeva 6–1, 6–2

=== Doubles ===
- (Hong Kong) Eudice Chong / (Chinese Taipei) Liang En-shuo def. (Chinese Taipei) Li Yu-yun / (China) Yao Xinxin 7–5, 6–3
