= Elsa Jacquemot =

French tennis player (born 2003)

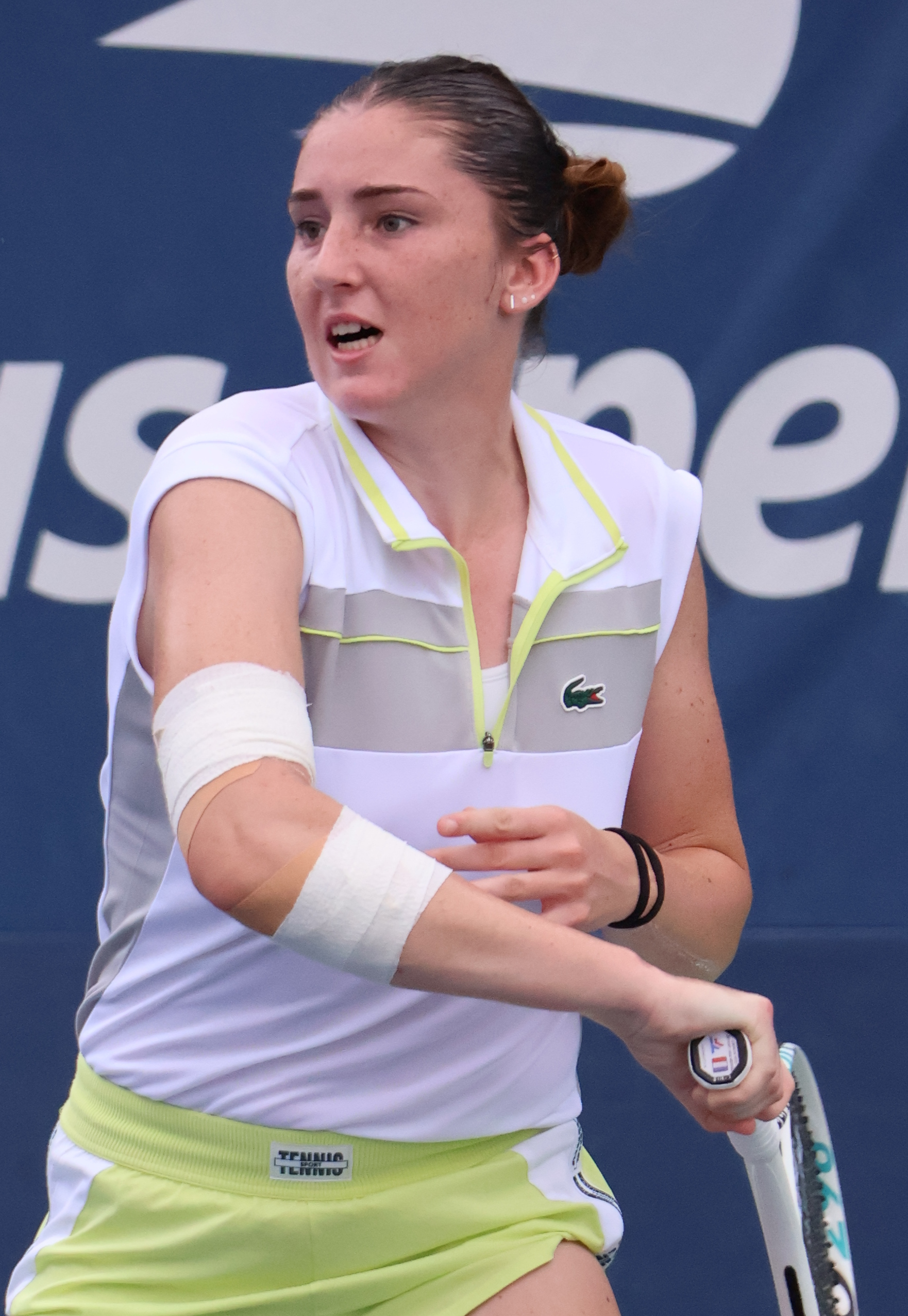
- Jacquemot at the 2023 US Open
- Country (sports): France
- Born: 3 May 2003 (age 23) Lyon, France
- Height: 1.76 m (5 ft 9 1/2 in)
- Turned pro: 2019
- Plays: Right-handed (two-handed backhand)
- Prize money: $2,499,137

Singles
- Career record: 222–204
- Career titles: 2 ITF
- Highest ranking: No. 53 (2 February 2026)
- Current ranking: No. 135 (26 October 2026)

Grand Slam singles results
- Australian Open: 2R (2026)
- French Open: 3R (2025)
- Wimbledon: 2R (2025)
- US Open: 2R (2025)

Doubles
- Career record: 41–73
- Career titles: 1 WTA 125
- Highest ranking: No. 149 (16 February 2026)
- Current ranking: No. 226 (26 October 2026)

Grand Slam doubles results
- Australian Open: 2R (2026)
- French Open: 1R (2020, 2021, 2022, 2023, 2024, 2026)
- Wimbledon: 1R (2026)
- Last updated on: 26 October 2026.

Elsa Jacquemot (born 3 May 2003) is a French tennis player. She has career-high WTA rankings of 53 in singles, achieved on 2 February 2026, and 149 in doubles, set on 16 February 2026.

== Early life ==
Born in Lyon, France, Elsa grew up in nearby Caluire-et-Cuire. Her parents, Jérémie and Céline Jacquemot, were both competitive athletes. Her father was a national champion in decathlon, while her mother won a national team championship in cross country running. She also has an older brother who practiced judo.

Jacquemot began playing tennis as a young child while accompanying her parents to the TC des Ronzières club near Lyon. A coach, Thierry Bret-Morel, noticed her hitting balls against a wall and offered to train her. She subsequently joined the Tennis Club de Lyon, where she trained under Cédric Lenoir. By the age of 13, she was pursuing her education through distance learning to accommodate her training schedule. She later trained at the All In Academy near Lyon under Simon Blanc and Nicolas Tourte, and had left formal education by 2020 to focus on her tennis career.

== Career ==
=== 2020: WTA Tour, major debuts, Roland Garros junior title ===
Jacquemot made her WTA Tour main-draw debut at the 2020 Lyon Open in the doubles draw, partnering Estelle Cascino.

She was awarded a wildcard into the women's main draw of the 2020 French Open, but lost to qualifier Renata Zarazúa in the first round. She participated also in the ladies' doubles main draw as a wildcard, partnering Elixane Lechemia. Seeded third, she then entered and became champion of the girls' singles competition at the 2020 French Open.

=== 2021–2023: French Open first win, US Open debut ===
Jacquemot was awarded a wildcard into the main draw at the 2021 French Open but lost in the first round to 21st seed Elena Rybakina in the first round.

She was awarded a third wildcard into the 2022 French Open and defeated Heather Watson for her first major match win, before losing in the second round to 21st seed Angelique Kerber.

Jacquemot reached the main draw at the 2023 US Open as a qualifier, making her debut at this major, but lost her opening match against Lesia Tsurenko in three sets.

She made her first WTA 125 final at the 2023 Open de Limoges, losing to fifth seed Cristina Bucșa in the final, having defeated Berfu Cengiz, third seed Arantxa Rus, wildcard Anastasija Sevastova and seventh seed Erika Andreeva on her way to the championship match.

=== 2024–2025: French Open 3rd round, WTA 500 semis, French No. 2 ===
Jacquemot received a wildcard for the 2024 French Open, losing in the first round to Ana Bogdan. but she returned to the top 150.

She made her Wimbledon debut as a lucky loser, although again suffered a defeat in the first round, this time to Sloane Stephens.

Jacquemot reached the semifinals at the 2024 Open de Limoges with wins over Anastasia Tikhonova, eighth seed Anastasia Zakharova and lucky loser Manon Léonard. She lost in the last four to Céline Naef. At the same tournament, she won her first WTA 125 doubles title, partnering with Margaux Rouvroy, to defeat Erika Andreeva and Séléna Janicijevic in the final.

Once more entering with a wildcard at the 2025 French Open, Jacquemot defeated Maria Sakkari and Alycia Parks but lost in the third round to fellow wildcard entrant and eventual semifinalist, Loïs Boisson. At the 2025 Wimbledon Championships, she recorded her first grass-court major win, defeating 27th seed Magda Linette, before losing to Belinda Bencic in the second round.

Back on clay courts later in July 2025, Jacquemot was runner-up at the WTA 125 event in Contrexéville losing the final to Francesca Jones. As a result, she made her top 100 debut in the WTA singles rankings on 14 July 2025, the 17th player to accomplish the feat in the season.

In August 2025, she qualified for the main draw at Tennis in Cleveland, going on to reach the quarterfinals with wins over Zhu Lin and Solana Sierra. Jacquemot lost in the last eight to Ann Li. At the 2025 US Open, Jacquemot defeated Marie Bouzková, before losing to 31st seed Leylah Fernandez in the second round. Following reaching her first WTA 500 semifinal at the Guadalajara Open, defeating two seeds in a row en route, top seed Elise Mertens and sixth seed Tatjana Maria, Jacquemot moved to a new career-high ranking of world No. 62 on 15 September and became the French No. 2 player.

Seeded second, Jacquemot made it through to the final at the WTA 125 Open de Limoges in December, but lost to Anhelina Kalinina in three sets. Teaming up with Jessika Ponchet, she also reached the doubles final at the same tournament, losing to top seeds Cristina Bucșa and Zhang Shuai.

=== 2026: Australian Open history, BJK Cup debut ===
At the Australian Open, Jacquemot defeated 20th seed Marta Kostyuk in the first triple tiebreak women's singles match at the tournament in the Open Era. She lost to Yulia Putintseva in the second round.

In April, Jacquemot made her debut for the France Billie Jean King Cup team in their play-off match against Norway, defeating Malene Helgø in straight sets.

At the French Open, she defeated qualifier Linda Fruhvirtová, before losing to world No. 1, Aryna Sabalenka, in the second round. The following month, Jacquemot was eliminated in the first round at Wimbledon by 14th seed Naomi Osaka. She also went out in the first round at the US Open, losing to 25th seed Marie Bouzková.

== Performance timeline ==
Key
W	F	SF	QF	#R	RR	Q#	P#	DNQ	A	Z#	PO	G	S	B	NMS	NTI	P	NH

(W) winner; (F) finalist; (SF) semifinalist; (QF) quarterfinalist; (#R) rounds 4, 3, 2, 1; (RR) round-robin stage; (Q#) qualification round; (P#) preliminary round; (DNQ) did not qualify; (A) absent; (Z#) Davis/Fed Cup Zonal Group (with number indication) or (PO) play-off; (G) gold, (S) silver or (B) bronze Olympic/Paralympic medal; (NMS) not a Masters tournament; (NTI) not a Tier I tournament; (P) postponed; (NH) not held; (SR) strike rate (events won / competed); (W–L) win–loss record.
To avoid confusion and double counting, these charts are updated at the conclusion of a tournament or when the player's participation has ended.

Only main-draw results in WTA Tour, Grand Slam tournaments, Billie Jean King Cup, United Cup, Hopman Cup and Olympic Games are included in win–loss records.

=== Singles ===
Current through the 2026 Italian Open.

Tournament	2019	2020	2021	2022	2023	2024	2025	2026	SR	W–L	Win%
Grand Slam tournaments
Australian Open	A	A	A	A	Q1	Q2	Q1	2R	0 / 1	1–1	50%
French Open	Q2	1R	1R	2R	Q3	1R	3R	2R	0 / 6	4–6	40%
Wimbledon	A	NH	A	Q1	Q1	1R	2R	1R	0 / 3	1–3	25%
US Open	A	A	A	Q1	1R	Q1	2R	1R	0 / 3	1–3	25%
Win–Loss	0–0	0–1	0–1	1–1	0–1	0–2	4–3	2–4	0 / 13	7–13	35%
WTA 1000 tournaments
Qatar Open	NTI	A	NTI	A	NTI	A	A	1R	0 / 1	0–1	0%
Dubai Championships	A	NTI	A	NTI	A	A	A	Q1	0 / 0	0–0	–
Indian Wells Open	A	NH	1R	A	A	A	A	1R	0 / 2	0–2	0%
Miami Open	A	NH	A	A	A	A	A	2R	0 / 1	1–1	50%
Madrid Open	A	NH	A	A	A	A	Q2	1R	0 / 1	0–1	0%
Italian Open	A	A	A	A	Q2	A	A	1R	0 / 1	0–1	0%
Canadian Open	A	NH	A	Q1	A	A	1R	A	0 / 1	0–1	–
Cincinnati Open	A	A	A	A	A	A	Q2	Q1	0 / 0	0–0	–
China Open	A	NH			A	Q1	1R	1R	0 / 2	0–2	0%
Wuhan Open	A	NH				A	A		0 / 0	0–0	–
Win–Loss	0–0	0–0	0–1	0–0	0–0	0–0	0–2	1–6	0 / 9	1–9	10%
Career statistics
	2019	2020	2021	2022	2023	2024	2025	2026	SR	W–L	Win%
Tournaments	0	1	2	1	2	7	8	10	Career total: 31		
Titles	0	0	0	0	0	0	0	0	Career total: 0		
Finals	0	0	0	0	0	0	0	0	Career total: 0		
Overall win–loss	0–0	0–1	0–2	1–2	0–2	2–7	9–8	2–10	0 / 32	14–32	30%
Year-end ranking (Note: 2018: WTA Ranking–1224.)	821	532	314	203	167	150	60		$2,489,790		

=== Doubles ===
Tournament	2020	2021	2022	2024	2025	W–L
Australian Open	A	A	A	A	A	0–0
French Open	1R	1R	1R	1R	1R	0–5
Wimbledon	NH	A	A	A	A	0–0
US Open	A	A	A	A	A	0–0
Win–Loss	0–1	0–1	0–1	0–1	0–1	0–5

== WTA 125 finals ==
=== Singles: 3 (3 runner-ups) ===
Result	W–L	Date	Tournament	Surface	Opponent	Score
Loss	0–1	Dec 2023	Open de Limoges, France	Hard (i)	(Spain) Cristina Bucșa	6–2, 1–6, 2–6
Loss	0–2	Jul 2025	Contrexéville Open, France	Clay	(United Kingdom) Francesca Jones	4–6, 6–7^{(2–7)}
Loss	0–3	Dec 2025	Open de Limoges, France	Hard (i)	(Ukraine) Anhelina Kalinina	3–6, 6–4, 5–7

=== Doubles: 2 (1 title, 1 runner-up) ===
Result	W–L	Date	Tournament	Surface	Partner	Opponents	Score
Win	1–0	Dec 2024	Open de Limoges, France	Hard (i)	(France) Margaux Rouvroy	(Russia) Erika Andreeva (France) Séléna Janicijevic	6–4, 6–3
Loss	1–1	Dec 2025	Open de Limoges, France	Hard (i)	(France) Jessika Ponchet	(Spain) Cristina Bucșa (China) Zhang Shuai	3–6, 1–6

== ITF Circuit finals ==
=== Singles: 6 (2 titles, 4 runner-ups) ===
Legend W100 tournaments (1–1) W75 tournaments (1–1) W25 tournaments (0–2)	Finals by surface Hard (2–4)

Result	W–L	Date	Tournament	Tier	Surface	Opponent	Score
Loss	0–1	Jun 2021	ITF Périgueux, France	W25	Hard	(France) Diane Parry	3–6, 1–6
Loss	0–2	Feb 2022	ITF Manacor, Spain	W25	Hard	(Spain) Andrea Lázaro García	6–2, 6–7^{(2)}, 1–6
Win	1–2	Dec 2022	Dubai Tennis Challenge, UAE	W100+H	Hard	(Poland) Magdalena Fręch	7–5, 6–2
Loss	1–3	Jan 2025	Open Andrézieux-Bouthéon 42, France	W75	Hard (i)	(France) Manon Léonard	6–1, 3–6, 4–6
Win	2–3	Feb 2025	ITF Leszno, Poland	W75	Hard (i)	(China) Gao Xinyu	6–4, 6–1
Loss	2–4	Oct 2026	ITF Wrexham, United Kingdom	W100	Hard (i)	(United Kingdom) Hannah Klugman	2–6, 4–6

=== Doubles: 1 (runner-up) ===
Legend W15 tournaments (0–1)	Finals by surface Clay (0–1)

Result	Date	Tournament	Tier	Surface	Partner	Opponents	Score
Loss	Mar 2021	ITF Amiens, France	W15+H	Clay (i)	(Andorra) Victoria Jiménez Kasintseva	(Australia) Seone Mendez (Mexico) María Portillo Ramírez	4–6, 3–6

== Junior Grand Slam tournament finals ==
=== Singles: 1 (title) ===
Result	Year	Tournament	Surface	Opponent	Score
Win	2020	French Open	Clay	(Russia) Alina Charaeva	4–6, 6–4, 6–2
