= 2025 Changsha Open – Singles =

Singles
- 2025 Changsha Open

Final
- Champion: (Slovenia) Veronika Erjavec
- Runner-up: Maria Timofeeva
- Score: 6–1, 6–2

Events
Singles	Doubles
- Changsha Open

Veronika Erjavec won the title, defeating Maria Timofeeva in the final, 6–1, 6–2.

Nina Stojanović was the reigning champion from when the tournament was last held in 2019, but did not participate this year.

== Seeds ==
1. (Argentina) María Lourdes Carlé (quarterfinals)
2. (Chinese Taipei) Joanna Garland (quarterfinals)
3. (Slovenia) Veronika Erjavec (champion)
4. (China) Gao Xinyu (quarterfinals, withdrew)
5. (Thailand) Lanlana Tararudee (quarterfinals)
6. (Japan) Mai Hontama (first round)
7. (China) Wei Sijia (first round)
8. Maria Timofeeva (final)

== Draw ==
Key

- Q = Qualifier
- WC = Wild card
- LL = Lucky loser
- Alt = Alternate
- ITF = ITF entry
- PR = Protected ranking
- SR = Special ranking
- SE = Special exempt
- JE = Junior exempt
- JR = Junior Accelerator Programme entrant
- CO = College Accelerator Programme entrant
- NG = Next Gen Accelerator Program entrant
- w/o = Walkover
- r = Retired
- d = Defaulted

=== Finals ===
Semifinals
8	Maria Timofeeva	6	6
Alina Charaeva	3	4
3	(Slovenia) Veronika Erjavec	0	7^{7}	6
Q	Ekaterina Reyngold	6	6^{3}	3

Final
8	Maria Timofeeva	1	2
3	(Slovenia) Veronika Erjavec	6	6

=== Top half ===
First round
1	(Argentina) ML Carlé	6	6
(China) X Yao	1	2
WC	(China) Y Ren	4	6	2
WC	(China) Y Yang	6	2	6
(China) W Zheng	0	3
WC	(China) X You	6	6
(China) H Shi	0	6^{2}
8	M Timofeeva	6	7^{7}
4	(China) X Gao	6	6
(Germany) A-L Friedsam	1	1
(France) C Paquet	6	6
Q	D Kudashova	4	4
WC	(China) Y Zhang	3	0^{r}
A Charaeva	6	2
(Kazakhstan) Z Kulambayeva	7	3	6
7	(China) S Wei	5	6	3

Second round
1	(Argentina) ML Carlé	6	6
WC	(China) Y Yang	2	0
WC	(China) X You	2	0
8	M Timofeeva	6	6
4	(China) X Gao	6	4	6
(France) C Paquet	3	6	4
A Charaeva	6	6
(Kazakhstan) Z Kulambayeva	1	4

Quarterfinals
1	(Argentina) ML Carlé	7	5	3
8	M Timofeeva	5	7	6
4	(China) X Gao
A Charaeva	w/o

Semifinals
8	M Timofeeva	6	6
A Charaeva	3	4

=== Bottom half ===
First round
5	(Thailand) L Tararudee	6	6
Q	(China) M Guo	4	3
(United States) H Chang	6	3	1
Q	(Italy) J Pieri	1	6	6
(China) Y Ma	3	6	6
(Chinese Taipei) E-s Liang	6	4	2
(France) C Monnet	3	2
3	(Slovenia) V Erjavec	6	6
6	(Japan) M Hontama	1	1
Q	E Reyngold	6	6
(Kazakhstan) Z Diyas	5^{r}
(Canada) C Zhao	5
(Cyprus) R Șerban	3	7^{7}	0
(Japan) S Saito	6	6^{1}	6
A Gasanova	0	4
2	(Chinese Taipei) J Garland	6	6

Second round
5	(Thailand) L Tararudee	6	7
Q	(Italy) J Pieri	2	5
(China) Y Ma	3	6^{3}
3	(Slovenia) V Erjavec	6	7^{7}
Q	E Reyngold	6	6
(Canada) C Zhao	4	2
(Japan) S Saito	2	4
2	(Chinese Taipei) J Garland	6	6

Quarterfinals
5	(Thailand) L Tararudee	0	6	6^{7}
3	(Slovenia) V Erjavec	6	2	7^{9}
Q	E Reyngold	6	6
2	(Chinese Taipei) J Garland	4	2

Semifinals
3	(Slovenia) V Erjavec	0	7^{7}	6
Q	E Reyngold	6	6^{3}	3

== Qualifying ==
=== Seeds ===
1. (South Korea) Park So-hyun (qualifying competition)
2. (Italy) Jessica Pieri (qualified)
3. (China) Wang Meiling (qualifying competition)
4. (Italy) Diletta Cherubini (qualifying competition, retired)
5. Daria Kudashova (qualified)
6. Ekaterina Reyngold (qualified)
7. (China) Guo Meiqi (qualified)
8. (China) Li Zongyu (qualifying competition)

=== Qualifiers ===
1. Daria Kudashova
2. (Italy) Jessica Pieri
3. (China) Guo Meiqi
4. Ekaterina Reyngold

=== Qualifying draw ===
==== First qualifier ====
First round
1	(South Korea) Park So-hyun	6	6
(Japan) Rinko Matsuda	0	3
(China) Wang Jiaqi	1	6^{4}
5	Daria Kudashova	6	7^{7}

Qualifying competition
1	(South Korea) Park So-hyun	4	4
5	Daria Kudashova	6	6

==== Second qualifier ====
First round
2	(Italy) Jessica Pieri	6	6
(South Korea) Jang Su-jeong	2	2
(China) Liu Fangzhou	4	2
8	(China) Li Zongyu	6	6

Qualifying competition
2	(Italy) Jessica Pieri	7^{7}	6
8	(China) Li Zongyu	6^{5}	1

==== Third qualifier ====
First round
3	(China) Wang Meiling	6^{5}	5
(Slovakia) Viktória Morvayová	7^{7}	5^{r}
WC	(China) Feng Shuo	1	0^{r}
7	(China) Guo Meiqi	6	0

Qualifying competition
3	(China) Wang Meiling	0	3
7	(China) Guo Meiqi	6	6

==== Fourth qualifier ====
First round
4	(Italy) Diletta Cherubini	6	6
WC	(China) Yuan Chengyiyi	3	3
(Hong Kong) Eudice Chong	4	1
6	Ekaterina Reyngold	6	6

Qualifying competition
4	(Italy) Diletta Cherubini	6	5^{r}
6	Ekaterina Reyngold	4	6
