= 2025 Cancún Tennis Open =

- Date: 10–15 February
- Edition: 1st
- Category: WTA 125
- Draw: 32S / 16D
- Prize money: $115,000
- Surface: Hard
- Location: Cancún, Mexico
- Venue: Cancún Country Club Residencial & Golf

Champions

Singles
- (Colombia) Emiliana Arango

Doubles
- (Australia) Maya Joint / (Australia) Taylah Preston
- Cancún Tennis Open

The 2025 Cancún Tennis Open was a professional women's tennis tournament played on outdoor hard courts. It was the first edition of the tournament and part of the 2025 WTA 125 tournaments, offering a total of $115,000 in prize money. It took place at the Cancún Country Club Residencial & Golf in Cancún, Mexico between 10 and 15 February 2025.

== Singles entrants ==
=== Seeds ===
Country	Player	Rank^{1}	Seed
GER	Tatjana Maria	74	3
ARG	María Lourdes Carlé	99	2
AUS	Maya Joint	102	3
CAN	Marina Stakusic	119	4
USA	Varvara Lepchenko	124	5
JPN	Ena Shibahara	144	6
ARG	Solana Sierra	152	7
GBR	Francesca Jones	154	8

- ^{1} Rankings are as of 3 February 2025.

=== Other entrants ===
The following players received a wildcard into the singles main draw:

- (Mexico) Jéssica Hinojosa Gómez
- ~~(United States) Caty McNally~~
- (Mexico) Victoria Rodríguez
- (United States) Madison Sieg

The following players received entry into the main draw through qualification:

- (Canada) Carson Branstine
- (United States) Lauren Davis
- (United States) Whitney Osuigwe
- (Netherlands) Eva Vedder

The following players received entry as lucky losers:

- (France) Séléna Janicijevic
- (Argentina) Julia Riera

=== Withdrawals ===
- (Netherlands) Arianne Hartono → replaced by (France) Séléna Janicijevic
- (United States) Caty McNally → replaced by (Argentina) Julia Riera

== Doubles entrants ==
=== Seeds ===
Country	Player	Country	Player	Rank	Seed
POL	Katarzyna Kawa	JPN	Ena Shibahara	153	1
USA	Sabrina Santamaria	CHN	Tang Qianhui	159	2
USA	Carmen Corley	USA	Quinn Gleason	193	3
	Maria Kozyreva		Iryna Shymanovich	270	4

- Rankings as of 3 February 2025.

=== Other entrants ===
The following team received a wildcard into the doubles main draw:

- (Mexico) Claudia Sofía Martínez Solís / (Mexico) María Fernanda Navarro Oliva

== Champions ==
=== Singles ===
- (Colombia) Emiliana Arango def. (Canada) Carson Branstine 6–2, 6–1

=== Doubles ===
- (Australia) Maya Joint / (Australia) Taylah Preston def. (Spain) Aliona Bolsova / (Spain) Yvonne Cavallé Reimers, 6–4, 6–3
