= 2025 Cancún Tennis Open – Singles =

Singles
- 2025 Cancún Tennis Open

Final
- Champion: (Colombia) Emiliana Arango
- Runner-up: (Canada) Carson Branstine
- Score: 6–2, 6–1

Events
Singles	Doubles
- Cancún Tennis Open

This is the first edition of the tournament.

Emiliana Arango won the title, defeating Carson Branstine 6–2, 6–1 in the final.

== Seeds ==
1. (Germany) Tatjana Maria (first round)
2. (Argentina) María Lourdes Carlé (first round)
3. (Australia) Maya Joint (semifinals)
4. (Canada) Marina Stakusic (second round)
5. (United States) Varvara Lepchenko (second round)
6. (Japan) Ena Shibahara (first round)
7. (Argentina) Solana Sierra (quarterfinals)
8. (United Kingdom) Francesca Jones (semifinals)

== Draw ==
Key

- Q = Qualifier
- WC = Wild card
- LL = Lucky loser
- Alt = Alternate
- ITF = ITF entry
- PR = Protected ranking
- SR = Special ranking
- SE = Special exempt
- JE = Junior exempt
- JR = Junior Accelerator Programme entrant
- CO = College Accelerator Programme entrant
- NG = Next Gen Accelerator Program entrant
- w/o = Walkover
- r = Retired
- d = Defaulted

=== Finals ===
Semifinals
8	(United Kingdom) Francesca Jones	6	1	5
(Colombia) Emiliana Arango	3	6	7
3	(Australia) Maya Joint	2	3
Q	(Canada) Carson Branstine	6	6

Final
(Colombia) Emiliana Arango	6	6
Q	(Canada) Carson Branstine	2	1

=== Top half ===
First round
1	(Germany) T Maria	2	2
I Shymanovich	6	6
(Australia) T Preston	6	4	6
WC	(Mexico) V Rodríguez	2	6	4
(United States) I Jovic	3	5
(United States) S Vickery	6	7
(Spain) A Bolsova	5	4
8	(United Kingdom) F Jones	7	6
4	(Canada) M Stakusic	6	6
(Canada) C Zhao	3	4
Q	(United States) W Osuigwe	4	4
(Colombia) E Arango	6	6
(Spain) I Burillo Escorihuela	3	4
LL	(France) S Janicijevic	6	6
(United States) M Mateas	3	6	3
5	(United States) V Lepchenko	6	4	6

Second round
I Shymanovich	6	1	7
(Australia) T Preston	4	6	5
(United States) S Vickery	3	3
8	(United Kingdom) F Jones	6	6
4	(Canada) M Stakusic	4	6^{0}
(Colombia) E Arango	6	7^{7}
LL	(France) S Janicijevic	7^{8}	7^{7}
5	(United States) V Lepchenko	6^{6}	6^{3}

Quarterfinals
I Shymanovich	1	0
8	(United Kingdom) F Jones	6	6
(Colombia) E Arango	6	7
LL	(France) S Janicijevic	1	5

Semifinals
8	(United Kingdom) F Jones	6	1	5
(Colombia) E Arango	3	6	7

=== Bottom half ===
First round
7	(Argentina) S Sierra	6	6
(Romania) PM Țig	0	3
LL	(Argentina) J Riera	6	6^{3}	5
(Netherlands) A Koevermans	1	7^{7}	7
WC	(Mexico) J Hinojosa Gómez	0	4
WC	(United States) M Sieg	6	6
(United States) H Chang	7^{7}	5	4
3	(Australia) M Joint	6^{4}	7	6
6	(Japan) E Shibahara	2	6	6^{2}
Q	(Canada) C Branstine	6	3	7^{7}
Q	(United States) L Davis	1	6	6
Q	(Netherlands) E Vedder	6	1	2
(Brazil) L Pigossi	6	5	1
(Poland) K Kawa	4	7	6
(United States) L Chirico	6	6
2	(Argentina) ML Carlé	3	4

Second round
7	(Argentina) S Sierra	7	6
(Netherlands) A Koevermans	5	3
WC	(United States) M Sieg	0	3
3	(Australia) M Joint	6	6
Q	(Canada) C Branstine	7^{7}	6
Q	(United States) L Davis	6^{4}	2
(Poland) K Kawa	6	6
(United States) L Chirico	2	1

Quarterfinals
7	(Argentina) S Sierra	5	7^{7}	1
3	(Australia) M Joint	7	6^{3}	6
Q	(Canada) C Branstine	6	6
(Poland) K Kawa	0	3

Semifinals
3	(Australia) M Joint	2	3
Q	(Canada) C Branstine	6	6

== Qualifying ==
=== Seeds ===
1. (Argentina) Julia Riera (qualifying competition, retired, lucky loser)
2. (France) Séléna Janicijevic (qualifying competition, lucky loser)
3. (United States) Whitney Osuigwe (qualified)
4. (United States) Lauren Davis (qualified)

=== Qualifiers ===
1. (Netherlands) Eva Vedder
2. (Canada) Carson Branstine
3. (United States) Whitney Osuigwe
4. (United States) Lauren Davis

=== Lucky loser ===
1. (Argentina) Julia Riera
2. (France) Séléna Janicijevic

=== Qualifying draw ===
==== First qualifier ====
Qualifying competition
1	(Argentina) Julia Riera	2	0^{r}
Alt	(Netherlands) Eva Vedder	6	2

==== Second qualifier ====
Qualifying competition
2	(France) Séléna Janicijevic	3	2
	(Canada) Carson Branstine	6	6

==== Third qualifier ====
Qualifying competition
3	(United States) Whitney Osuigwe	6	6
WC	(Mexico) Claudia Sofía Martínez Solís	2	1

==== Fourth qualifier ====
Qualifying competition
4	(United States) Lauren Davis	6	6
WC	(Mexico) Ximena Senties	2	0
