= Cancún Tennis Open =

WTA 125
- Event name: Cancún Tennis Open
- Tour: WTA Tour
- Founded: 2025
- Location: Cancún, Quintana Roo, Mexico
- Venue: Cancún Country Club Residencial & Golf
- Category: WTA 125
- Surface: Hard - outdoors
- Draw: 32S / 16D
- Prize money: US$ 115,000 (2025)
- Website: Website

Current champions (2025)
- Singles: (Colombia) Emiliana Arango
- Doubles: (Australia) Maya Joint (Australia) Taylah Preston

The Cancún Tennis Open, is a WTA 125-level professional women's tennis tournament. It takes place on outdoor hardcourts, in the month of February at the Cancún Country Club Residencial & Golf in the city of Cancún, Mexico. The tournament was introduced in 2025.

== Results ==
=== Singles ===
Year	Champion	Runner-up	Score
2025	(Colombia) Emiliana Arango	(Canada) Carson Branstine	6–2, 6–1
2026	Not held		

=== Doubles ===
Year	Champions	Runners-up	Score
2025	(Australia) Maya Joint (Australia) Taylah Preston	(Spain) Aliona Bolsova (Spain) Yvonne Cavallé Reimers	6–4, 6–3
2026	Not held		
