= 2026 Australian Open – Women's doubles =

Tennis championship

Women's doubles
- 2026 Australian Open
- Final date: 31 January 2026

Final
- Champions: (Belgium) Elise Mertens (China) Zhang Shuai
- Runners-up: (Kazakhstan) Anna Danilina (Serbia) Aleksandra Krunić
- Score: 7–6^{(7–4)}, 6–4

Details
- Draw: 64
- Seeds: 16

Events
Singles	men	women		boys	girls
Doubles	men	women	mixed	boys	girls
WC Singles	men	women	quad	boys	girls
WC Doubles	men	women	quad	boys	girls
- Australian Open

Elise Mertens and Zhang Shuai defeated Anna Danilina and Aleksandra Krunić in the final, 7–6^{(7–4)}, 6–4 to win the women's doubles tennis title at the 2026 Australian Open. It was their first major title as a team, and the third major title overall for Zhang and sixth for Mertens. Mertens and Zhang saved three match points en route to the title, in the second round against Iva Jovic and Victoria Mboko. Mertens regained the WTA No. 1 doubles ranking by reaching the final; Kateřina Siniaková, Jeļena Ostapenko, Erin Routliffe and the pair of Sara Errani and Jasmine Paolini were also in contention at the beginning of the tournament.

Siniaková and Taylor Townsend were the defending champions, but lost in the quarterfinals to Danilina and Krunić.

== Seeds ==
1. (Czech Republic) Kateřina Siniaková / (United States) Taylor Townsend (quarterfinals)
2. (Italy) Sara Errani / (Italy) Jasmine Paolini (second round)
3. (Chinese Taipei) Hsieh Su-wei / (Latvia) Jeļena Ostapenko (quarterfinals)
4. (Belgium) Elise Mertens / (China) Zhang Shuai (champions)
5. (Canada) Gabriela Dabrowski / (Brazil) Luisa Stefani (semifinals)
6. (United States) Asia Muhammad / (New Zealand) Erin Routliffe (third round)
7. (Kazakhstan) Anna Danilina / (Serbia) Aleksandra Krunić (final)
8. (Australia) Ellen Perez / (Netherlands) Demi Schuurs (third round)
9. (Spain) Cristina Bucșa / (United States) Nicole Melichar-Martinez (third round)
10. Liudmila Samsonova / Diana Shnaider (first round)
11. Irina Khromacheva / Alexandra Panova (first round)
12. (Slovakia) Tereza Mihalíková / (United Kingdom) Olivia Nicholls (second round)
13. (United States) Sofia Kenin / (Germany) Laura Siegemund (third round)
14. (Chinese Taipei) Chan Hao-ching / (China) Jiang Xinyu (first round)
15. (Japan) Miyu Kato / (Hungary) Fanny Stollár (third round, withdrew)
16. (China) Guo Hanyu / (France) Kristina Mladenovic (third round)

Click on the seed number of a player to go to their draw section.

== Draw ==
Key

- Q = Qualifier
- WC = Wild card
- LL = Lucky loser
- Alt = Alternate
- ITF = ITF entry
- PR = Protected ranking
- SR = Special ranking
- SE = Special exempt
- JE = Junior exempt
- JR = Junior Accelerator Programme entrant
- CO = College Accelerator Programme entrant
- NG = Next Gen Accelerator Program entrant
- w/o = Walkover
- r = Retired
- d = Defaulted

=== Finals ===
Quarterfinals
1	(Czech Republic) Kateřina Siniaková (United States) Taylor Townsend	2	6	0
7	(Kazakhstan) Anna Danilina (Serbia) Aleksandra Krunić	6	3	6
3	(Chinese Taipei) Hsieh Su-wei (Latvia) Jeļena Ostapenko	1	6^{5}
5	(Canada) Gabriela Dabrowski (Brazil) Luisa Stefani	6	7^{7}
(Japan) Eri Hozumi (Chinese Taipei) Wu Fang-hsien	6	4	3
4	(Belgium) Elise Mertens (China) Zhang Shuai	4	6	6
PR	(Japan) Ena Shibahara; Vera Zvonareva	6	6^{3}	7
WC	(Australia) Kimberly Birrell (Australia) Talia Gibson	4	7^{7}	5

Semifinals
7	(Kazakhstan) Anna Danilina (Serbia) Aleksandra Krunić	7^{7}	3	6
5	(Canada) Gabriela Dabrowski (Brazil) Luisa Stefani	6^{2}	6	4
4	(Belgium) Elise Mertens (China) Zhang Shuai	6	6
PR	(Japan) Ena Shibahara; Vera Zvonareva	3	2

Final
7	(Kazakhstan) Anna Danilina (Serbia) Aleksandra Krunić	6^{4}	4
4	(Belgium) Elise Mertens (China) Zhang Shuai	7^{7}	6

=== Top half ===
==== Section 1 ====
First round
1	(Czech Republic) K Siniaková (United States) T Townsend	6	6
(Belgium) M Kempen (Czech Republic) A Sisková	3	4
(China) Y Xu (China) Z Yang	6	6
Alt	(Croatia) A Ružić (Mexico) R Zarazúa	4	2
(Czech Republic) J Malečková (Czech Republic) M Škoch	6	6
Alt	(Czech Republic) S Bejlek (Brazil) L Pigossi	2	1
(Switzerland) V Golubic (United States) A Li	4	3
15	(Japan) M Kato (Hungary) F Stollár	6	6
12	(Slovakia) T Mihalíková (United Kingdom) O Nicholls	6	6
(Hungary) A Bondár (Romania) J Cristian	3	2
(Australia) P Hon (United States) A Krueger	6	1	3
(Australia) S Hunter (Australia) M Joint	1	6	6
(Poland) K Piter (Indonesia) J Tjen	6	4	4
WC	(Australia) D Kasatkina (Australia) Ar Rodionova	1	6	6
(United States) Q Gleason; E Pridankina	5	6	0
7	(Kazakhstan) A Danilina (Serbia) A Krunić	7	4	6

Second round
1	(Czech Republic) K Siniaková (United States) T Townsend	7^{9}	6
(China) Y Xu (China) Z Yang	6^{7}	1
(Czech Republic) J Malečková (Czech Republic) M Škoch	6	5	6^{8}
15	(Japan) M Kato (Hungary) F Stollár	2	7	7^{10}
12	(Slovakia) T Mihalíková (United Kingdom) O Nicholls	2	6	3
(Australia) S Hunter (Australia) M Joint	6	3	6
WC	(Australia) D Kasatkina (Australia) Ar Rodionova	3	4
7	(Kazakhstan) A Danilina (Serbia) A Krunić	6	6

Third round
1	(Czech Republic) K Siniaková (United States) T Townsend	w/o
15	(Japan) M Kato (Hungary) F Stollár
(Australia) S Hunter (Australia) M Joint	5	6^{6}
7	(Kazakhstan) A Danilina (Serbia) A Krunić	7	7^{8}

Quarterfinals
1	(Czech Republic) K Siniaková (United States) T Townsend	2	6	0
7	(Kazakhstan) A Danilina (Serbia) A Krunić	6	3	6

==== Section 2 ====
First round
3	(Chinese Taipei) S-w Hsieh (Latvia) J Ostapenko	7	6
(Australia) O Gadecki (United States) D Krawczyk	5	2
I Shymanovich (Argentina) S Sierra	3	6	0
(Serbia) O Danilović (Austria) A Potapova	6	3	6
PR	(Czech Republic) M Bouzková (Slovenia) A Klepač	5
(Netherlands) S Lamens (Germany) E Lys	0^{r}
(United States) C McNally (Colombia) C Osorio	5	3
13	(United States) S Kenin (Germany) L Siegemund	7	6
9	(Spain) C Bucșa (United States) N Melichar-Martinez	6	4	6
(Hungary) T Babos (Canada) L Fernandez	4	6	3
(Mexico) G Olmos (Indonesia) A Sutjiadi	7	6
WC	(Australia) D Aiava (Australia) M Inglis	5	3
WC	E Alexandrova (United States) V Williams	6^{3}	4
(Colombia) E Arango (France) E Jacquemot	7^{7}	6
(United States) M Kessler (United States) J Pegula	4	6^{3}
5	(Canada) G Dabrowski (Brazil) L Stefani	6	7^{7}

Second round
3	(Chinese Taipei) S-w Hsieh (Latvia) J Ostapenko	w/o
(Serbia) O Danilović (Austria) A Potapova
PR	(Czech Republic) M Bouzková (Slovenia) A Klepač	4	4
13	(United States) S Kenin (Germany) L Siegemund	6	6
9	(Spain) C Bucșa (United States) N Melichar-Martinez	6	7^{8}
(Mexico) G Olmos (Indonesia) A Sutjiadi	1	6^{6}
(Colombia) E Arango (France) E Jacquemot	2	4
5	(Canada) G Dabrowski (Brazil) L Stefani	6	6

Third round
3	(Chinese Taipei) S-w Hsieh (Latvia) J Ostapenko	6	6
13	(United States) S Kenin (Germany) L Siegemund	3	2
9	(Spain) C Bucșa (United States) N Melichar-Martinez	4	3
5	(Canada) G Dabrowski (Brazil) L Stefani	6	6

Quarterfinals
3	(Chinese Taipei) S-w Hsieh (Latvia) J Ostapenko	1	6^{5}
5	(Canada) G Dabrowski (Brazil) L Stefani	6	7^{7}

=== Bottom half ===
==== Section 3 ====
First round
8	(Australia) E Perez (Netherlands) D Schuurs	6	6
(Netherlands) I Haverlag (United Kingdom) S Kartal	2	1
(Ukraine) N Kichenok (Japan) M Ninomiya	6	6
WC	(Australia) E Jones (Australia) A Sharma	4	2
(Germany) T Maria (Switzerland) S Waltert	6^{0}	1
M Kozyreva (United States) S Santamaria	7^{7}	6
(Japan) E Hozumi (Chinese Taipei) F-h Wu	6	4	6
11	I Khromacheva; A Panova	1	6	4
14	(Chinese Taipei) H-c Chan (China) X Jiang	6	5	6^{1}
A Blinkova (Uzbekistan) K Rakhimova	3	7	7^{10}
(United States) H Baptiste (United States) P Stearns	6	7
(Spain) J Bouzas Maneiro (Italy) E Cocciaretto	3	5
PR	(Norway) U Eikeri (Estonia) I Neel	5	3
(United States) I Jovic (Canada) V Mboko	7	6
(Romania) S Cîrstea; A Kalinskaya	4	2
4	(Belgium) E Mertens (China) S Zhang	6	6

Second round
8	(Australia) E Perez (Netherlands) D Schuurs	7	6
(Ukraine) N Kichenok (Japan) M Ninomiya	5	1
M Kozyreva (United States) S Santamaria	2	3
(Japan) E Hozumi (Chinese Taipei) F-h Wu	6	6
A Blinkova (Uzbekistan) K Rakhimova	3	4
(United States) H Baptiste (United States) P Stearns	6	6
(United States) I Jovic (Canada) V Mboko	5	6	6^{10}
4	(Belgium) E Mertens (China) S Zhang	7	4	7^{12}

Third round
8	(Australia) E Perez (Netherlands) D Schuurs	2	2
(Japan) E Hozumi (Chinese Taipei) F-h Wu	6	6
(United States) H Baptiste (United States) P Stearns	4	3
4	(Belgium) E Mertens (China) S Zhang	6	6

Quarterfinals
(Japan) E Hozumi (Chinese Taipei) F-h Wu	6	4	3
4	(Belgium) E Mertens (China) S Zhang	4	6	6

==== Section 4 ====
First round
6	(United States) A Muhammad (New Zealand) E Routliffe	6	6
(Czech Republic) L Nosková (Slovakia) R Šramková	4	4
(Philippines) A Eala (Brazil) I Martins	6^{3}	6	3
(Japan) S Aoyama (Poland) M Linette	7^{7}	2	6
WC	(Australia) L Cabrera (Australia) T Preston	6	6
(China) Xin Wang (China) S Zheng	3	4
PR	(Japan) E Shibahara; V Zvonareva	7^{7}	6
10	L Samsonova; D Shnaider	6^{4}	1
16	(China) H Guo (France) K Mladenovic	6	6
(United States) A Parks (Ukraine) D Yastremska	4	3
A Pavlyuchenkova (Denmark) C Tauson	6^{6}	6	6
(Ukraine) L Kichenok (United States) K Volynets	7^{8}	4	4
WC	(Australia) K Birrell (Australia) T Gibson	6	7^{7}
WC	(Japan) M Kobori (Japan) A Shimizu	3	6^{3}
(United Kingdom) M Lumsden (China) Q Tang	3	2
2	(Italy) S Errani (Italy) J Paolini	6	6

Second round
6	(United States) A Muhammad (New Zealand) E Routliffe	7^{7}	4	6
(Japan) S Aoyama (Poland) M Linette	6^{3}	6	3
WC	(Australia) L Cabrera (Australia) T Preston	4	3
PR	(Japan) E Shibahara; V Zvonareva	6	6
16	(China) H Guo (France) K Mladenovic	6	4	6
A Pavlyuchenkova (Denmark) C Tauson	1	6	2
WC	(Australia) K Birrell (Australia) T Gibson	3	6	7^{10}
2	(Italy) S Errani (Italy) J Paolini	6	3	6^{8}

Third round
6	(United States) A Muhammad (New Zealand) E Routliffe	5	6	1
PR	(Japan) E Shibahara; V Zvonareva	7	3	6
16	(China) H Guo (France) K Mladenovic	6	4	2
WC	(Australia) K Birrell (Australia) T Gibson	3	6	6

Quarterfinals
PR	(Japan) E Shibahara; V Zvonareva	6	6^{3}	7
WC	(Australia) K Birrell (Australia) T Gibson	4	7^{7}	5

== Seeded teams ==
The following are the seeded teams, based on WTA rankings as of 12 January 2026.

Country	Player	Country	Player	Rank	Seed
CZE	Kateřina Siniaková	USA	Taylor Townsend	3	1
ITA	Sara Errani	ITA	Jasmine Paolini	6	2
TPE	Hsieh Su-wei	LAT	Jeļena Ostapenko	13	3
BEL	Elise Mertens	CHN	Zhang Shuai	22	4
CAN	Gabriela Dabrowski	BRA	Luisa Stefani	23	5
USA	Asia Muhammad	NZL	Erin Routliffe	28	6
KAZ	Anna Danilina	SRB	Aleksandra Krunić	31	7
AUS	Ellen Perez	NED	Demi Schuurs	41	8
ESP	Cristina Bucșa	USA	Nicole Melichar-Martinez	42	9
	Liudmila Samsonova		Diana Shnaider	53	10
	Irina Khromacheva		Alexandra Panova	53	11
SVK	Tereza Mihalíková	GBR	Olivia Nicholls	55	12
USA	Sofia Kenin	GER	Laura Siegemund	63	13
TPE	Chan Hao-ching	CHN	Jiang Xinyu	65	14
JPN	Miyu Kato	HUN	Fanny Stollár	70	15
CHN	Guo Hanyu	FRA	Kristina Mladenovic	72	16

== Other entry information ==
=== Wildcards ===
- (Australia) Destanee Aiava / (Australia) Maddison Inglis
- Ekaterina Alexandrova / (United States) Venus Williams
- (Australia) Kimberly Birrell / (Australia) Talia Gibson
- (Australia) Lizette Cabrera / (Australia) Taylah Preston
- (Australia) Emerson Jones / (Australia) Astra Sharma
- (Australia) Daria Kasatkina / (Australia) Arina Rodionova
- (Japan) Momoko Kobori / (Japan) Ayano Shimizu

=== Protected ranking ===
- (Czech Republic) Marie Bouzková / (Slovenia) Andreja Klepač
- (Norway) Ulrikke Eikeri / (Estonia) Ingrid Neel
- (Japan) Ena Shibahara / Vera Zvonareva

=== Alternates ===
- (Czech Republic) Sára Bejlek / (Brazil) Laura Pigossi
- (Croatia) Antonia Ružić / (Mexico) Renata Zarazúa

=== Withdrawals ===
- ‡ (France) Loïs Boisson / (Germany) Tatjana Maria → replaced by (Germany) Tatjana Maria / (Switzerland) Simona Waltert
- ‡ (United Kingdom) Francesca Jones / (United Kingdom) Maia Lumsden → replaced by (United Kingdom) Maia Lumsden / (China) Tang Qianhui
- § (Ukraine) Marta Kostyuk / (Romania) Elena-Gabriela Ruse → replaced by (Czech Republic) Sára Bejlek / (Brazil) Laura Pigossi
- ‡ (Czech Republic) Barbora Krejčíková / (United States) Caty McNally → replaced by (Colombia) Camila Osorio / (Kazakhstan) Yulia Putintseva
- ‡ (Colombia) Camila Osorio / (Kazakhstan) Yulia Putintseva → replaced by (United States) Caty McNally / (Colombia) Camila Osorio
- ‡ (China) Tang Qianhui / (China) Wang Yafan → replaced by (United Kingdom) Francesca Jones / (United Kingdom) Maia Lumsden
- § (Czech Republic) Tereza Valentová / (Czech Republic) Markéta Vondroušová → replaced by (Croatia) Antonia Ružić / (Mexico) Renata Zarazúa

‡ – withdrew from entry list
§ – withdrew from main draw
