= 2019 Fed Cup Americas Zone Group I – Pool A =

Subsection of tennis competition

Pool A of the 2019 Fed Cup Americas Zone Group I was one of two pools in the Americas zone of the 2019 Fed Cup. Four teams competed in a round robin competition. The top team and the bottom team proceeded to their respective sections of the play-offs. The top team played for advancement to the World Group II Play-offs. The bottom team faced potential relegation to Group II.

== Standings ==
		PAR	MEX	COL	ECU	RR; W–L	Set; W–L	Game; W–L	Standings
1	Paraguay		2–1	1–2	3–0	2–1	12–6 (67%)	101–77 (57%)	1
4	Mexico	1–2		2–1	3–0	2–1	12–7 (63%)	97–85 (53%)	2
5	Colombia	2–1	1–2		2–1	2–1	10–9 (53%)	95–97 (49%)	3
7	Ecuador	0–3	0–3	1–2		0–3	4–16 (20%)	85–119 (42%)	4

Standings are determined by: 1. number of wins; 2. number of matches; 3. in two-team ties, head-to-head records; 4. in three-team ties, (a) percentage of sets won (head-to-head records if two teams remain tied), then (b) percentage of games won (head-to-head records if two teams remain tied), then (c) Fed Cup rankings.

== Round-robin ==
=== Paraguay vs. Ecuador ===
Paraguay
3
Club Campestre Sede Llanogrande, Medellín, Colombia
6 February
Clay

Ecuador
0

			1	2	3
1	(Paraguay) (Ecuador)	Montserrat González; Mell Elizabeth Reasco González	7; 5	6; 3
2	(Paraguay) (Ecuador)	Verónica Cepede Royg; Charlotte Römer	7^{7} 6^{2}	6; 2
3	(Paraguay) (Ecuador)	Verónica Cepede Royg / Montserrat González; Mell Elizabeth Reasco González / Charlotte Römer	7; 5	6; 3

=== Mexico vs. Colombia ===
Mexico
2
Club Campestre Sede Llanogrande, Medellín, Colombia
6 February
Clay

Colombia
1

			1	2	3
1	(Mexico) (Colombia)	Victoria Rodríguez; Camila Osorio	3; 6	4; 6
2	(Mexico) (Colombia)	Renata Zarazúa; Emiliana Arango	6; 4	6; 1
3	(Mexico) (Colombia)	Giuliana Olmos / Renata Zarazúa; Camila Osorio / María Paulina Pérez	6; 4	7^{7} 6^{4}

=== Paraguay vs. Colombia ===
Paraguay
1
Club Campestre Sede Llanogrande, Medellín, Colombia
7 February
Clay

Colombia
2

			1	2	3
1	(Paraguay) (Colombia)	Montserrat González; Camila Osorio	3; 6	4; 6
2	(Paraguay) (Colombia)	Verónica Cepede Royg; Emiliana Arango	6; 3	6; 2
3	(Paraguay) (Colombia)	Verónica Cepede Royg / Montserrat González; Emiliana Arango / Camila Osorio	6^{7} 7^{9}	6^{4} 7^{7}

=== Mexico vs. Ecuador ===
Mexico
3
Club Campestre Sede Llanogrande, Medellín, Colombia
7 February
Clay

Ecuador
0

			1	2	3
1	(Mexico) (Ecuador)	Giuliana Olmos; Mell Elizabeth Reasco González	5; 7	6; 2	7^{8} 6^{6}
2	(Mexico) (Ecuador)	Renata Zarazúa; Charlotte Römer	6; 4	7; 5
3	(Mexico) (Ecuador)	Giuliana Olmos / Renata Zarazúa; Charlotte Römer / María Paula Suárez Almeida	6; 2	6; 1

=== Paraguay vs. Mexico ===
Paraguay
2
Club Campestre Sede Llanogrande, Medellín, Colombia
8 February
Clay

Mexico
1

			1	2	3
1	(Paraguay) (Mexico)	Montserrat González; Giuliana Olmos	6; 4	6; 3
2	(Paraguay) (Mexico)	Verónica Cepede Royg; Renata Zarazúa	6; 2	6; 1
3	(Paraguay) (Mexico)	Verónica Cepede Royg / Montserrat González; Giuliana Olmos / Renata Zarazúa	4; 6	3; 6

=== Colombia vs. Ecuador ===
Colombia
2
Club Campestre Sede Llanogrande, Medellín, Colombia
8 February
Clay

Ecuador
1

			1	2	3
1	(Colombia) (Ecuador)	Camila Osorio; Mell Elizabeth Reasco González	6; 3	5; 7	6; 3
2	(Colombia) (Ecuador)	Emiliana Arango; Charlotte Römer	6^{5} 7^{7}	2; 6
3	(Colombia) (Ecuador)	Emiliana Arango / Camila Osorio; Mell Elizabeth Reasco González / Charlotte Römer	6; 4	6; 4
