= 2025 Cancún Tennis Open – Doubles =

Doubles
- 2025 Cancún Tennis Open

Final
- Champions: (Australia) Maya Joint (Australia) Taylah Preston
- Runners-up: (Spain) Aliona Bolsova (Spain) Yvonne Cavallé Reimers
- Score: 6–4, 6–3

Events
Singles	Doubles
- Cancún Tennis Open

Maya Joint and Taylah Preston won the doubles title at the first edition of the Cancún Tennis Open, defeating Aliona Bolsova and Yvonne Cavallé Reimers in the final, 6–4, 6–3.

== Seeds ==
1. (Poland) Katarzyna Kawa / (Japan) Ena Shibahara (semifinals)
2. (United States) Sabrina Santamaria / (China) Tang Qianhui (semifinals)
3. (United States) Carmen Corley / (United States) Quinn Gleason (quarterfinals)
4. Maria Kozyreva / Iryna Shymanovich (quarterfinals)

== Draw ==
Key

- Q = Qualifier
- WC = Wild card
- LL = Lucky loser
- Alt = Alternate
- ITF = ITF entry
- PR = Protected ranking
- SR = Special ranking
- SE = Special exempt
- JE = Junior exempt
- JR = Junior Accelerator Programme entrant
- CO = College Accelerator Programme entrant
- NG = Next Gen Accelerator Program entrant
- w/o = Walkover
- r = Retired
- d = Defaulted

=== Draw ===
First round
1	(Poland) K Kawa (Japan) E Shibahara	6	7^{7}
M Kononova (Sweden) L Zaar	4	6^{3}
(Netherlands) A Hartono (Netherlands) E Vedder	6	6
(United Kingdom) T Moore (United States) W Osuigwe	2	4
3	(United States) C Corley (United States) Q Gleason	6	6
(Argentina) ML Carlé (Brazil) L Pigossi	4	4
(Spain) A Bolsova (Spain) Y Cavallé Reimers	6	7^{7}
(Argentina) J Riera (Argentina) S Sierra	2	6^{4}
(United States) I Jovic (United States) V Lepchenko	4	0
(Australia) M Joint (Australia) T Preston	6	6
(United States) M Mateas (United States) A Smith	4	2
4	M Kozyreva; I Shymanovich	6	6
(United States) H Giavara (United States) D Hewitt	6	3	[10]
(Spain) A Herrero Liñana (United States) C Rosca	3	6	[7]
WC	(Mexico) CS Martínez Solís (Mexico) MF Navarro Oliva	1	0
2	(United States) S Santamaria (China) Q Tang	6	6

Quarterfinals
1	(Poland) K Kawa (Japan) E Shibahara	6	6
(Netherlands) A Hartono (Netherlands) E Vedder	1	4
3	(United States) C Corley (United States) Q Gleason	6	4	[8]
(Spain) A Bolsova (Spain) Y Cavallé Reimers	4	6	[10]
(Australia) M Joint (Australia) T Preston	7^{7}	6^{1}	[10]
4	M Kozyreva; I Shymanovich	6^{5}	7^{7}	[7]
(United States) H Giavara (United States) D Hewitt	1	6	[6]
2	(United States) S Santamaria (China) Q Tang	6	4	[10]

Semifinals
1	(Poland) K Kawa (Japan) E Shibahara	0	7	[7]
(Spain) A Bolsova (Spain) Y Cavallé Reimers	6	5	[10]
(Australia) M Joint (Australia) T Preston	6	6
2	(United States) S Santamaria (China) Q Tang	1	4

Final
(Spain) A Bolsova (Spain) Y Cavallé Reimers	4	3
(Australia) M Joint (Australia) T Preston	6	6
