= 2026 Australian Open – Women's singles =

Tennis championship

Women's singles
- 2026 Australian Open

Final
- Champion: (Kazakhstan) Elena Rybakina
- Runner-up: Aryna Sabalenka
- Score: 6–4, 4–6, 6–4
- Date: 31 January 2026

Details
- Draw: 128 (16Q / 8WC)
- Seeds: 32

Events
Singles	men	women		boys	girls
Doubles	men	women	mixed	boys	girls
WC Singles	men	women	quad	boys	girls
WC Doubles	men	women	quad	boys	girls

Qualification
Singles	men	women
- Australian Open

Elena Rybakina defeated Aryna Sabalenka in the final, 6–4, 4–6, 6–4 to win the women's singles tennis title at the 2026 Australian Open. It was her second major title. Rybakina was the fourth woman (after Jennifer Capriati, Serena Williams, and Madison Keys) since the establishment of the WTA rankings to defeat both the world No. 1 and No. 2 players en route to the Australian Open title. The final was a rematch of the 2023 final, won by Sabalenka.

Keys was the defending champion, but lost in the fourth round to Jessica Pegula.

Sabalenka was the first woman to reach four consecutive Australian Open women's singles finals since Martina Hingis in 2000. Sabalenka and Rybakina both reached the final without losing a set en route, the first time both finalists at a major did so since Serena and Venus Williams at the 2008 Wimbledon Championships.

Aged 45 years and 7 months old, Venus Williams became the oldest woman to compete in the singles main draw at the Australian Open, surpassing the previous record set by Kimiko Date in 2015. The first round match between Karolína Plíšková and Sloane Stephens was the first major main draw match contested between two players ranked outside the top 1,000 since the current WTA Tour format was established in 1990.

Zeynep Sönmez became the first Turkish woman to record a win at the event and the first Turkish player to advance to the third round. This was the first Australian Open to have four Americans in the quarterfinals since 2001. For the first time in the Open Era, the top six seeds reached the quarterfinals in both the women's and men's singles competitions.

== Seeds ==
1. Aryna Sabalenka (final)
2. (Poland) Iga Świątek (quarterfinals)
3. (United States) Coco Gauff (quarterfinals)
4. (United States) Amanda Anisimova (quarterfinals)
5. (Kazakhstan) Elena Rybakina (champion)
6. (United States) Jessica Pegula (semifinals)
7. (Italy) Jasmine Paolini (third round)
8. Mirra Andreeva (fourth round)
9. (United States) Madison Keys (fourth round)
10. (Switzerland) Belinda Bencic (second round)
11. Ekaterina Alexandrova (first round)
12. (Ukraine) Elina Svitolina (semifinals)
13. (Czech Republic) Linda Nosková (third round)
14. (Denmark) Clara Tauson (third round)
15. (United States) Emma Navarro (first round)
16. (Japan) Naomi Osaka (third round, withdrew)
17. (Canada) Victoria Mboko (fourth round)
18. Liudmila Samsonova (first round)
19. (Czech Republic) Karolína Muchová (fourth round)
20. (Ukraine) Marta Kostyuk (first round)
21. (Belgium) Elise Mertens (fourth round)
22. (Canada) Leylah Fernandez (first round)
23. Diana Shnaider (third round)
24. (Latvia) Jeļena Ostapenko (second round)
25. (Spain) Paula Badosa (second round)
26. (Ukraine) Dayana Yastremska (first round)
27. (United States) Sofia Kenin (first round)
28. (United Kingdom) Emma Raducanu (second round)
29. (United States) Iva Jovic (quarterfinals)
30. (Australia) Maya Joint (first round)
31. Anna Kalinskaya (third round)
32. (Czech Republic) Markéta Vondroušová (withdrew)

== Draw ==
Key

- Q = Qualifier
- WC = Wild card
- LL = Lucky loser
- Alt = Alternate
- ITF = ITF entry
- PR = Protected ranking
- SR = Special ranking
- SE = Special exempt
- JE = Junior exempt
- JR = Junior Accelerator Programme entrant
- CO = College Accelerator Programme entrant
- NG = Next Gen Accelerator Program entrant
- w/o = Walkover
- r = Retired
- d = Defaulted

=== Finals ===
Quarterfinals
1	Aryna Sabalenka	6	6
29	(United States) Iva Jovic	3	0
3	(United States) Coco Gauff	1	2
12	(Ukraine) Elina Svitolina	6	6
6	(United States) Jessica Pegula	6	7^{7}
4	(United States) Amanda Anisimova	2	6^{1}
5	(Kazakhstan) Elena Rybakina	7	6
2	(Poland) Iga Świątek	5	1

Semifinals
1	Aryna Sabalenka	6	6
12	(Ukraine) Elina Svitolina	2	3
6	(United States) Jessica Pegula	3	6^{7}
5	(Kazakhstan) Elena Rybakina	6	7^{9}

Final
1	Aryna Sabalenka	4	6	4
5	(Kazakhstan) Elena Rybakina	6	4	6

=== Top half ===
==== Section 1 ====
First round
1	A Sabalenka	6	6
WC	(France) T Rakotomanga Rajaonah	4	1
A Pavlyuchenkova	4	6	6^{10}
Q	(China) Z Bai	6	2	7^{12}
(Netherlands) S Lamens	6	5	2
(Austria) A Potapova	3	7	6
PR	(Thailand) M Sawangkaew	4	1
28	(United Kingdom) E Raducanu	6	6
17	(Canada) V Mboko	6	6
WC	(Australia) E Jones	4	1
(United States) C McNally	6	6
Q	(Japan) H Sakatsume	3	1
(Uzbekistan) P Kudermetova	6	6
Q	(Spain) G Maristany	2	3
(Hungary) D Gálfi	3	3
14	(Denmark) C Tauson	6	6

Second round
1	A Sabalenka	6	6
Q	(China) Z Bai	3	1
(Austria) A Potapova	7^{7}	6
28	(United Kingdom) E Raducanu	6^{3}	2
17	(Canada) V Mboko	6	6
(United States) C McNally	4	3
(Uzbekistan) P Kudermetova	3	6	5
14	(Denmark) C Tauson	6	3	7

Third round
1	A Sabalenka	7^{7}	7^{9}
(Austria) A Potapova	6^{4}	6^{7}
17	(Canada) V Mboko	7^{7}	5	6
14	(Denmark) C Tauson	6^{5}	7	3

Fourth round
1	A Sabalenka	6	7^{7}
17	(Canada) V Mboko	1	6^{1}

==== Section 2 ====
First round
11	E Alexandrova	5	6	4
Q	(Turkey) Z Sönmez	7	4	6
(Hungary) A Bondár	6	6
WC	(United States) E Mandlik	0	4
(Kazakhstan) Y Putintseva	3	7	6
(Brazil) B Haddad Maia	6	5	3
(France) E Jacquemot	6^{4}	7^{7}	7^{10}
20	(Ukraine) M Kostyuk	7^{7}	6^{4}	6^{7}
29	(United States) I Jovic	6	6
(United States) K Volynets	2	3
WC	(Australia) P Hon	1	6	5
Q	(Canada) M Stakusic	6	4	3^{r}
(Slovenia) V Erjavec	1	1
(Poland) M Fręch	6	6
Q	A Sasnovich	1	2
7	(Italy) J Paolini	6	6

Second round
Q	(Turkey) Z Sönmez	6	6
(Hungary) A Bondár	2	4
(Kazakhstan) Y Putintseva	6	6
(France) E Jacquemot	1	2
29	(United States) I Jovic	6	6
WC	(Australia) P Hon	1	2
(Poland) M Fręch	2	3
7	(Italy) J Paolini	6	6

Third round
Q	(Turkey) Z Sönmez	3	7^{7}	3
(Kazakhstan) Y Putintseva	6	6^{3}	6
29	(United States) I Jovic	6	7^{7}
7	(Italy) J Paolini	2	6^{3}

Fourth round
(Kazakhstan) Y Putintseva	0	1
29	(United States) I Jovic	6	6

==== Section 3 ====
First round
3	(United States) C Gauff	6	6
(Uzbekistan) K Rakhimova	2	3
(Serbia) O Danilović	6^{5}	6	6
WC	(United States) V Williams	7^{7}	3	4
Q	(Australia) S Hunter	6	6
(Spain) J Bouzas Maneiro	4	4
(United States) H Baptiste	6	6^{3}	6
LL	(United States) T Townsend	3	7^{7}	3
19	(Czech Republic) K Muchová	6	7^{8}
(Romania) J Cristian	3	6^{6}
(United States) A Parks	0	6	6
(Philippines) A Eala	6	3	2
(United States) A Li	6	6^{5}	7
(Colombia) C Osorio	4	7^{7}	5
(Poland) M Linette	3	6	6
15	(United States) E Navarro	6	3	3

Second round
3	(United States) C Gauff	6	6
(Serbia) O Danilović	2	2
Q	(Australia) S Hunter	2	1
(United States) H Baptiste	6	6
19	(Czech Republic) K Muchová	4	6	6
(United States) A Parks	6	4	4
(United States) A Li	3	3
(Poland) M Linette	6	6

Third round
3	(United States) C Gauff	3	6	6
(United States) H Baptiste	6	0	3
19	(Czech Republic) K Muchová	6	6
(Poland) M Linette	1	1

Fourth round
3	(United States) C Gauff	6	3	6
19	(Czech Republic) K Muchová	1	6	3

==== Section 4 ====
First round
12	(Ukraine) E Svitolina	6	6
(Spain) C Bucșa	4	1
Q	(Poland) L Klimovičová	6	3
(United Kingdom) F Jones	2	2^{r}
WC	(Australia) T Gibson	6	6
A Blinkova	1	3
(Czech Republic) B Krejčíková	6	3	3
23	D Shnaider	2	6	6
26	(Ukraine) D Yastremska	4	5
(Romania) E-G Ruse	6	7
Q	(Ukraine) Y Starodubtseva	6	6^{3}	1
(Australia) A Tomljanović	4	7^{7}	6
(Greece) M Sakkari	6	6
(France) L Jeanjean	4	2
(Croatia) D Vekić	6	3	0
8	M Andreeva	4	6	6

Second round
12	(Ukraine) E Svitolina	7	6
Q	(Poland) L Klimovičová	5	1
WC	(Australia) T Gibson	6	5	3
23	D Shnaider	3	7	6
(Romania) E-G Ruse	6	6
(Australia) A Tomljanović	4	4
(Greece) M Sakkari	0	4
8	M Andreeva	6	6

Third round
12	(Ukraine) E Svitolina	7^{7}	6
23	D Shnaider	6^{4}	3
(Romania) E-G Ruse	3	4
8	M Andreeva	6	6

Fourth round
12	(Ukraine) E Svitolina	6	6
8	M Andreeva	2	4

=== Bottom half ===
==== Section 5 ====
First round
6	(United States) J Pegula	6	6
A Zakharova	2	1
(Colombia) E Arango	3	2
(United States) M Kessler	6	6
O Selekhmeteva	6	3	6
(Germany) E Seidel	3	6	0
WC	(Kazakhstan) Z Diyas	2	4
25	(Spain) P Badosa	6	6
22	(Canada) L Fernandez	2	6^{1}
(Indonesia) J Tjen	6	7^{7}
PR	(Czech Republic) Ka Plíšková	7^{9}	6
Q	(United States) S Stephens	6^{7}	2
(United States) A Krueger	6	6
(Czech Republic) S Bejlek	3	3
(Ukraine) O Oliynykova	6^{6}	1
9	(United States) M Keys	7^{8}	6

Second round
6	(United States) J Pegula	6	6
(United States) M Kessler	0	2
O Selekhmeteva	6	6
25	(Spain) P Badosa	4	4
(Indonesia) J Tjen	4	4
PR	(Czech Republic) Ka Plíšková	6	6
(United States) A Krueger	1	5
9	(United States) M Keys	6	7

Third round
6	(United States) J Pegula	6	6
O Selekhmeteva	3	2
PR	(Czech Republic) Ka Plíšková	3	3
9	(United States) M Keys	6	6

Fourth round
6	(United States) J Pegula	6	6
9	(United States) M Keys	3	4

==== Section 6 ====
First round
13	(Czech Republic) L Nosková	6	6
(Latvia) D Semeņistaja	3	0
(China) S Zhang	3	6	3
WC	(Australia) T Preston	6	2	6
(China) Xin Wang	6	6
Q	(Ukraine) A Kalinina	3	3
(Slovakia) R Šramková	4	4
24	(Latvia) J Ostapenko	6	6
27	(United States) S Kenin	3	2
(United States) P Stearns	6	6
(Croatia) P Marčinko	6	7
(Germany) T Maria	3	5
(Hungary) P Udvardy	1	2
(Czech Republic) K Siniaková	6	6
(Switzerland) S Waltert	3	2
4	(United States) A Anisimova	6	6

Second round
13	(Czech Republic) L Nosková	6	4	6
WC	(Australia) T Preston	2	6	2
(China) Xin Wang	4	6	6
24	(Latvia) J Ostapenko	6	4	4
(United States) P Stearns	6	7
(Croatia) P Marčinko	2	5
(Czech Republic) K Siniaková	1	4
4	(United States) A Anisimova	6	6

Third round
13	(Czech Republic) L Nosková	5	4
(China) Xin Wang	7	6
(United States) P Stearns	1	4
4	(United States) A Anisimova	6	6

Fourth round
(China) Xin Wang	6^{4}	4
4	(United States) A Anisimova	7^{7}	6

==== Section 7 ====
First round
5	(Kazakhstan) E Rybakina	6	6
(Slovenia) K Juvan	4	3
(France) V Gracheva	6	2	6
(Switzerland) V Golubic	1	6	1
(New Zealand) L Sun	3	5
Q	(Czech Republic) L Fruhvirtová	6	7
(Czech Republic) T Valentová	6	6
30	(Australia) M Joint	4	4
21	(Belgium) E Mertens	7	6
Q	(Thailand) L Tararudee	5	1
(Argentina) S Sierra	3	1
(Japan) M Uchijima	6	6
(Australia) D Kasatkina	6^{7}	6	3
Q	(Czech Republic) N Bartůňková	7^{9}	0	6
(United Kingdom) K Boulter	0	5
10	(Switzerland) B Bencic	6	7

Second round
5	(Kazakhstan) E Rybakina	7	6
(France) V Gracheva	5	2
Q	(Czech Republic) L Fruhvirtová	5	6	3
(Czech Republic) T Valentová	7	2	6
21	(Belgium) E Mertens	6	6
(Japan) M Uchijima	3	1
Q	(Czech Republic) N Bartůňková	6	0	6
10	(Switzerland) B Bencic	3	6	4

Third round
5	(Kazakhstan) E Rybakina	6	6
(Czech Republic) T Valentová	2	3
21	(Belgium) E Mertens	6	6
Q	(Czech Republic) N Bartůňková	0	4

Fourth round
5	(Kazakhstan) E Rybakina	6	6
21	(Belgium) E Mertens	1	3

==== Section 8 ====
First round
16	(Japan) N Osaka	6	3	6
(Croatia) A Ružić	3	6	4
(Romania) S Cîrstea	3	6	6
(Germany) E Lys	6	4	3
Q	(Australia) M Inglis	7^{8}	6^{9}	6
(Australia) K Birrell	6^{6}	7^{11}	4
(Germany) L Siegemund	0	7	6
18	L Samsonova	6	5	4
31	A Kalinskaya	7^{7}	6
(United Kingdom) S Kartal	6^{3}	1
(Austria) J Grabher	7	2	6
(Italy) E Cocciaretto	5	6	4
(Mexico) R Zarazúa	2	5
(Czech Republic) M Bouzková	6	7
Q	(China) Y Yuan	6^{5}	3
2	(Poland) I Świątek	7^{7}	6

Second round
16	(Japan) N Osaka	6	4	6
(Romania) S Cîrstea	3	6	2
Q	(Australia) M Inglis	6	6^{3}	7^{10}
(Germany) L Siegemund	4	7^{7}	6^{7}
31	A Kalinskaya	6	6
(Austria) J Grabher	3	3
(Czech Republic) M Bouzková	2	3
2	(Poland) I Świątek	6	6

Third round
16	(Japan) N Osaka
Q	(Australia) M Inglis	w/o
31	A Kalinskaya	1	6	1
2	(Poland) I Świątek	6	1	6

Fourth round
Q	(Australia) M Inglis	0	3
2	(Poland) I Świątek	6	6

== Championship match statistics ==
Category	(Kazakhstan) Rybakina	Sabalenka
1st serve %	54/98 (55%)	53/86 (62%)
1st serve points won	41 of 54 = 76%	40 of 53 = 75%
2nd serve points won	21 of 44 = 48%	16 of 33 = 48%
Total service points won	62 of 98 = 63.27%	56 of 86 = 65.12%
Aces	6	5
Double faults	3	2
Winners	28	35
Unforced errors	25	26
Net points won	10 of 15 = 67%	8 of 10 = 80%
Break points converted	3 of 6 = 50%	2 of 8 = 25%
Return points won	28 of 86 = 33%	33 of 98 = 34%
Total points won	92	92

== Seeded players ==
The following are the seeded players, based on WTA rankings as of 12 January 2026. Rankings and points before are as of 19 January 2026.

Because the tournament took place one week later this year, points defending also included tournaments that took place during the week of 27 January 2025 (Linz and Singapore), which were replaced by the player's next best result.

^{‡}	Champion
^{†}	Runner-up

Seed	Rank	Player	Points before	Points defending	Points won	Points after	Status
1	1	Aryna Sabalenka^{†}	10,990	1,300	1,300	10,990	Final lost to (Kazakhstan) Elena Rybakina [5]
2	2	(Poland) Iga Świątek	8,328	780	430	7,978	Quarterfinals lost to (Kazakhstan) Elena Rybakina [5]
3	3	(United States) Coco Gauff	6,423	430	430	6,423	Quarterfinals lost to (Ukraine) Elina Svitolina [12]
4	4	(United States) Amanda Anisimova	6,320	70	430	6,680	Quarterfinals lost to (United States) Jessica Pegula [6]
5	5	(Kazakhstan) Elena Rybakina^{‡}	5,850	240	2,000	7,610	Champion, defeated Aryna Sabalenka [1]
6	6	(United States) Jessica Pegula	5,453	130	780	6,103	Semifinals lost to (Kazakhstan) Elena Rybakina [5]
7	8	(Italy) Jasmine Paolini	4,267	130	130	4,267	Third round lost to (United States) Iva Jovic [29]
8	7	Mirra Andreeva	4,731	240	240	4,731	Fourth round lost to (Ukraine) Elina Svitolina [12]
9	9	(United States) Madison Keys	4,111	2,000	240	2,351	Fourth round lost to (United States) Jessica Pegula [6]
10	10	(Switzerland) Belinda Bencic	3,512	240	70	3,342	Second round lost to (Czech Republic) Nikola Bartůňková [Q]
11	11	Ekaterina Alexandrova	3,375	10+500	10+108	2,983	First round lost to (Turkey) Zeynep Sönmez [Q]
12	12	(Ukraine) Elina Svitolina	2,856	430+1	780+0	3,205	Semifinals lost to Aryna Sabalenka [1]
13	13	(Czech Republic) Linda Nosková	2,641	10	130	2,761	Third round lost to (China) Wang Xinyu
14	14	(Denmark) Clara Tauson	2,530	130+195	130+10	2,345	Third round lost to (Canada) Victoria Mboko [17]
15	15	(United States) Emma Navarro	2,515	430	10	2,095	First round lost to (Poland) Magda Linette
16	17	(Japan) Naomi Osaka	2,366	130	130	2,366	Third round withdrew due to abdominal injury
17	16	(Canada) Victoria Mboko	2,447	(35+78) (Note: Did not qualify for the tournament in 2025 and is instead defending points from two ITF tournaments.)	240+32	2,606	Fourth round lost to Aryna Sabalenka [1]
18	18	Liudmila Samsonova	2,122	70	10	2,062	First round lost to (Germany) Laura Siegemund
19	19	(Czech Republic) Karolína Muchová	2,083	70+195	240+0	2,058	Fourth round lost to (United States) Coco Gauff [3]
20	20	(Ukraine) Marta Kostyuk	1,983	130	10	1,863	First round lost to (France) Elsa Jacquemot
21	21	(Belgium) Elise Mertens	1,956	70+250	240+60	1,936	Fourth round lost to (Kazakhstan) Elena Rybakina [5]
22	23	(Canada) Leylah Fernandez	1,821	130	10	1,701	First round lost to (Indonesia) Janice Tjen
23	22	Diana Shnaider	1,953	130	130	1,953	Third round lost to (Ukraine) Elina Svitolina [12]
24	24	(Latvia) Jeļena Ostapenko	1,741	10	70	1,801	Second round lost to (China) Wang Xinyu
25	26	(Spain) Paula Badosa	1,676	780	70	966	Second round lost to Oksana Selekhmeteva
26	28	(Ukraine) Dayana Yastremska	1,610	130+325	10+10	1,175	First round lost to (Romania) Elena-Gabriela Ruse
27	30	(United States) Sofia Kenin	1,567	10	10	1,567	First round lost to (United States) Peyton Stearns
28	29	(United Kingdom) Emma Raducanu	1,607	130	70	1,547	Second round lost to (Austria) Anastasia Potapova
29	27	(United States) Iva Jovic	1,671	70	430	2,031	Quarterfinals lost to Aryna Sabalenka [1]
30	31	(Australia) Maya Joint	1,549	10	10	1,549	First round lost to (Czech Republic) Tereza Valentová
31	33	Anna Kalinskaya	1,511	0+98	130+32	1,575	Third round lost to (Poland) Iga Świątek [2]
32	34	(Czech Republic) Markéta Vondroušová	1,446	0	0	1,446	Withdrew due to shoulder injury

Withdrawn seeded players

The following players would have been seeded, but withdrew before the tournament began.

Rank	Player	Points before	Points defending	Points after	Withdrawal reason
25	(China) Zheng Qinwen	1,728	70	1,658	Right elbow injury
32	Veronika Kudermetova	1,517	240	1,277	Personal reasons

== Other entry information ==
=== Wildcards ===
The following players received wildcards into the women's singles main draw:

- (Kazakhstan) Zarina Diyas
- (Australia) Talia Gibson
- (Australia) Priscilla Hon
- (Australia) Emerson Jones
- (United States) Elizabeth Mandlik
- (Australia) Taylah Preston
- (France) Tiantsoa Rakotomanga Rajaonah
- (United States) Venus Williams

=== Protected ranking ===
- (Czech Republic) Karolína Plíšková (40)
- (Thailand) Mananchaya Sawangkaew (100)

=== Qualifiers ===
- (China) Bai Zhuoxuan
- (Czech Republic) Nikola Bartůňková
- (Czech Republic) Linda Fruhvirtová
- (Australia) Storm Hunter
- (Australia) Maddison Inglis
- (Ukraine) Anhelina Kalinina
- (Poland) Linda Klimovičová
- (Spain) Guiomar Maristany
- (Japan) Himeno Sakatsume
- Aliaksandra Sasnovich
- (Turkey) Zeynep Sönmez
- (Canada) Marina Stakusic
- (Ukraine) Yuliia Starodubtseva
- (United States) Sloane Stephens
- (Thailand) Lanlana Tararudee
- (China) Yuan Yue

=== Lucky loser ===
- (United States) Taylor Townsend

=== Withdrawals ===
The entry list was released based on the WTA rankings for the week of 8 December 2025, which was the usual cutoff deadline date.

- † (United States) Danielle Collins (64) → replaced by (Slovenia) Kaja Juvan (102)
- † (Tunisia) Ons Jabeur (76) → replaced by (France) Léolia Jeanjean (103)
- ‡ (China) Zheng Qinwen (24) → replaced by (Uzbekistan) Polina Kudermetova (104) (Note: Originally represented Russia in the initial entry list at the time of publish, but switched her nationality to Uzbekistan from 15 December 2025.)
- ‡ Veronika Kudermetova (30) → replaced by (Slovenia) Veronika Erjavec (105)
- ‡ (China) Wang Yafan (71 SR) → replaced by (United Kingdom) Katie Boulter (106)
- ‡ (France) Loïs Boisson (36) → replaced by Anastasia Zakharova (107)
- § (Czech Republic) Markéta Vondroušová (34) → replaced by (United States) Taylor Townsend (LL)

† – not included on entry list
‡ – withdrew from entry list
§ – withdrew from main draw

== Notes ==
Preceded by 2025 US Open – Women's singles	Grand Slam women's singles	Succeeded by 2026 French Open – Women's singles
