= Carson Branstine =

Canadian and American tennis player (born 2000)

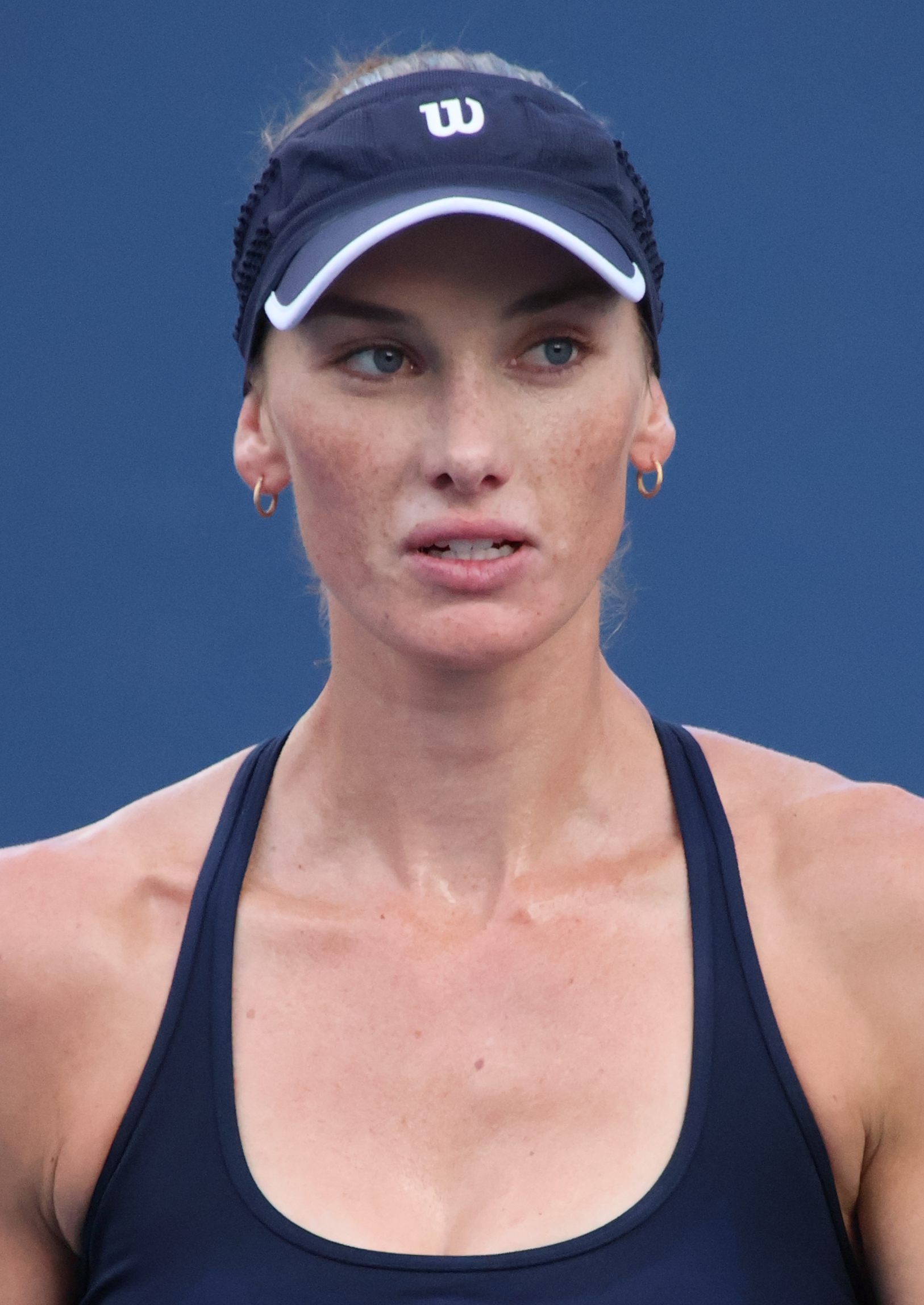
- Branstine at the 2026 US Open
- Country (sports): United States (2014–17); Canada (2017–present)
- Residence: Orange, California, US
- Born: September 9, 2000 (age 26) Irvine, California
- Height: 1.80 m (5 ft 11 in)
- Plays: Right (two-handed backhand)
- Prize money: $398,079

Singles
- Career record: 149–85
- Career titles: 7 ITF
- Highest ranking: No. 172 (October 6, 2025)
- Current ranking: No. 681 (November 9, 2026)

Grand Slam singles results
- Australian Open: Q2 (2026)
- French Open: Q2 (2025)
- Wimbledon: 1R (2025)
- US Open: Q3 (2026)

Doubles
- Career record: 38–28
- Career titles: 3 ITF
- Highest ranking: No. 203 (September 18, 2017)
- Last updated on: 15 November 2026.

Carson Branstine (born September 9, 2000) is an American-born Canadian model and professional tennis player. She has a career-high singles ranking of No. 172 by the WTA, achieved on 6 October 2025. She also reached a best doubles ranking of world No. 203, on 18 September 2017.

Branstine represented the United States before switching to Canada, the birth country of her mother, in 2017. That year, she reached a career-high junior ranking of No. 4 and won the Australian Open and French Open girls' doubles titles with Bianca Andreescu. After several years battling injury, she played college tennis for the Texas A&M Aggies and helped lead the team to its first national title as a redshirt senior in 2024.

== Early life ==
Branstine was born in Irvine, California, to an American father, Bruce, and a Canadian mother, Carol Freeman, from Toronto. She has two older sisters, Cassidy and Constance, both of whom play collegiate tennis. Her cousin Freddie Freeman is a professional baseball first baseman and MVP for the Los Angeles Dodgers of Major League Baseball (MLB). Branstine began playing tennis at the age of 7. After spending a few years training at the USTA, Branstine accepted an offer from Tennis Canada to train at the National Training Centre in Montreal, starting in October 2016.

== Career ==
=== 2014–15 ===
Branstine played her first ITF junior tournament in November 2014 at the G4 in Atlanta and won the doubles title. Two weeks later at the G4 in Boca Raton, she captured her first junior singles title and also won in doubles. In March 2015, she played her first professional tournament, losing to Karolína Stuchlá in the first round in Gainesville, Florida. In June 2015, she won the doubles title at the G4 in Haverford, Pennsylvania. Branstine qualified for her first junior major main draw at the US Open in September, but lost to Evgeniya Levashova in the opening round. She also reached the second round in doubles.

=== 2016 ===
In March, Branstine captured her second junior singles title with a victory over Ann Li at the G4 in Newport Beach, California. She won her third junior singles title in June at the G4 in Plantation, Florida. In September, she reached the quarterfinals in singles of the junior US Open, upsetting second seed Olesya Pervushina in the second round. In November, she advanced to the semifinals in doubles at the 50k Toronto Challenger with partner Elena Bovina. Also in November, she reached the doubles semifinals at the ITF GA in Mexico City. In December, Branstine made it to the semifinals in singles and to the quarterfinals in doubles at the Eddie Herr G1 in Bradenton, Florida. The following week, she advanced to the semifinals of the GA Orange Bowl.

=== 2017 ===
At the Australian Open, Branstine reached the third round in girls' singles and captured the doubles title with Bianca Andreescu. She started representing Canada officially in March and played her first tournament as a Canadian at the G1 in Carson, California at the end of the month, where she went on to win both the singles and doubles titles. In the junior event of the French Open, Branstine lost in the opening round in singles, but won her second straight major doubles title with Bianca Andreescu. In July at the G1 in Roehampton, she won the doubles title with Marta Kostyuk. At Wimbledon, she lost in the quarterfinals in singles and in the semifinals in doubles with Kostyuk, ending her hopes of winning a third straight junior doubles Grand Slam title. In August at the Rogers Cup, she was awarded a wildcard into the doubles draw with compatriot Bianca Andreescu, her first WTA Tour main draw. They upset Kristina Mladenovic and Anastasia Pavlyuchenkova in the first round, before falling to the top seeds, Ekaterina Makarova and Elena Vesnina. At the junior US Open in September, Branstine was defeated in the second round in both singles and doubles. The following week at the Tournoi de Québec, she advanced with Andreescu to her first WTA Tour doubles final in which they were defeated by the top-seeded Tímea Babos and Andrea Hlaváčková.

=== 2019–2024: College years ===
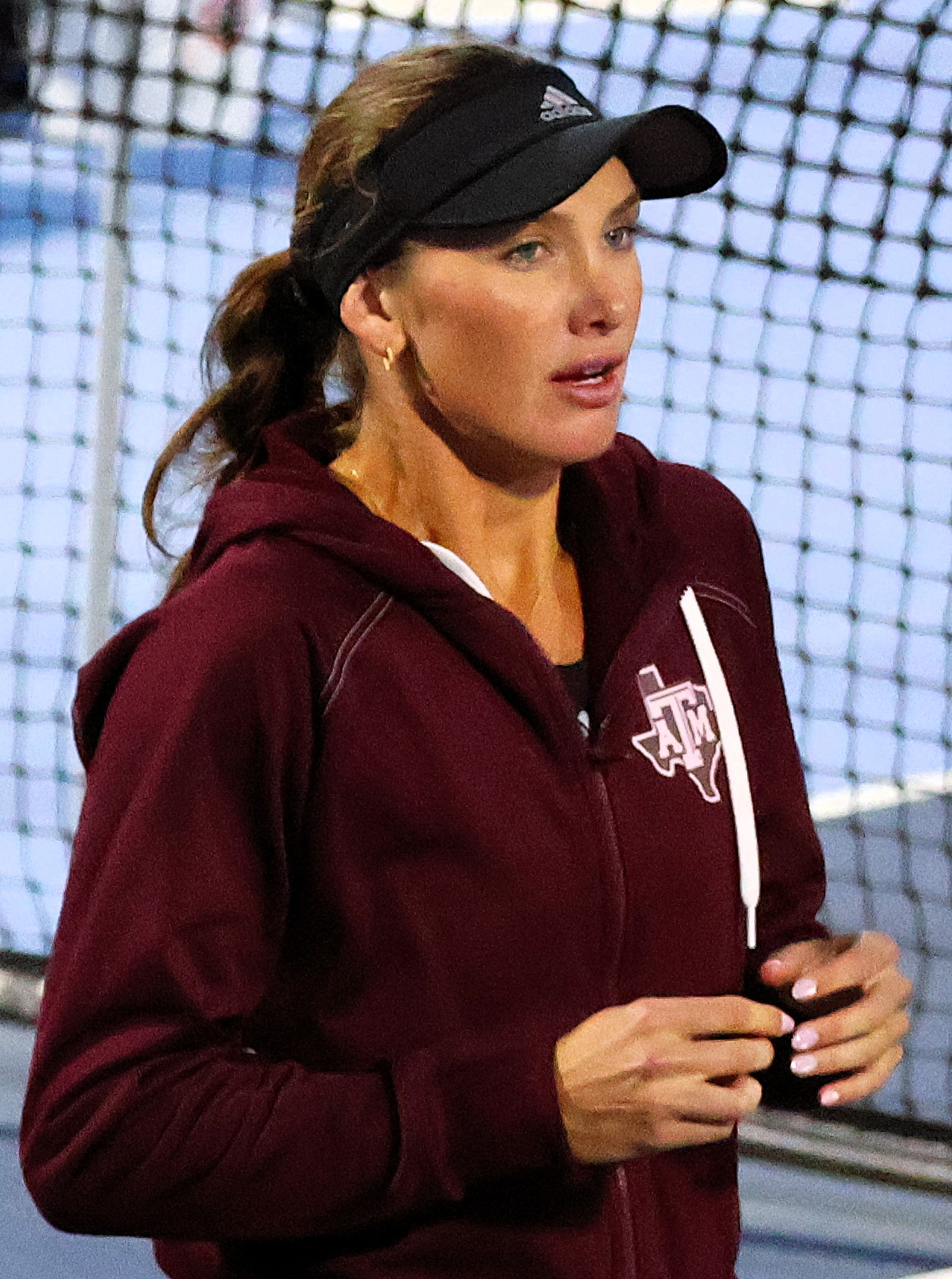
Branstine with Texas A&M in 2024

Branstine made the decision to accept a full scholarship at the University of Southern California in 2019, and transferred to the University of Virginia, after spending a redshirt season at USC. She did not play the tennis season at USC or Virginia due to injury. Branstine majored in Society, Ethics and Law with a minor in Philosophy. She transferred to Texas A&M where she played two seasons of college tennis before a season-ending injury in 2023. During her collegiate career, she reached a career-high ITA ranking of No. 2 in doubles and No. 8 in singles.

After playing on the ITF Women's World Tennis Tour as late as April 2024, Branstine returned to Texas A&M for the 2024 postseason. She was named in the NCAA all-tournament team after helping lead to the Aggies to their first NCAA Championship. In the SEC and NCAA tournaments, she went 5–1 in doubles with Lucciana Pérez Alarcón and 4–1 in singles.

=== 2025: Major, WTA Tour and BJK Cup debuts ===
As a qualifier, Branstine reached her first WTA 125 final at the Cancún Open in February, losing to Emiliana Arango in straight sets.

In June, she made her WTA Tour main-draw debut, after qualifying for the Rosmalen Open in the Netherlands, and defeated top seed Liudmila Samsonova in the first round. Branstine lost to fellow qualifier Elena-Gabriela Ruse in her next match.

Branstine defeated French Open semifinalist Loïs Boisson, fellow Canadian Bianca Andreescu, and Raluca Șerban in qualifying to make it through to her first major main-draw at Wimbledon. She lost to world No. 1, Aryna Sabalenka, in the first round. Despite her loss, she reached a new career-high ranking of world No. 178, on 14 July 2025.

She was given a wildcard into the main draw of the Canadian Open, but lost in the first round to Maria Sakkari, in three sets.

In November, Branstine was named in the Canadian team for the BJK Cup play-offs and made her debut in their second group match against Mexico, defeating Julia García Ruiz in straight sets.

== Other ventures ==
Away from tennis, Branstine works as a professional model and is signed to two modelling agencies.

== Grand Slam performance timeline ==
Key
W	F	SF	QF	#R	RR	Q#	P#	DNQ	A	Z#	PO	G	S	B	NMS	NTI	P	NH

(W) winner; (F) finalist; (SF) semifinalist; (QF) quarterfinalist; (#R) rounds 4, 3, 2, 1; (RR) round-robin stage; (Q#) qualification round; (P#) preliminary round; (DNQ) did not qualify; (A) absent; (Z#) Davis/Fed Cup Zonal Group (with number indication) or (PO) play-off; (G) gold, (S) silver or (B) bronze Olympic/Paralympic medal; (NMS) not a Masters tournament; (NTI) not a Tier I tournament; (P) postponed; (NH) not held; (SR) strike rate (events won / competed); (W–L) win–loss record.
To avoid confusion and double counting, these charts are updated at the conclusion of a tournament or when the player's participation has ended.

=== Singles ===
Tournament	2025	2026	SR	W–L
Australian Open	A	Q2	0 / 0	0–0
French Open	Q2	A	0 / 0	0–0
Wimbledon	1R	A	0 / 1	0–1
US Open	Q1	Q3	0 / 0	0–0
Win–Loss	0–1	0–0	0 / 1	0–1

== WTA Tour finals ==
=== Doubles: 1 (runner-up) ===
Legend WTA 500 WTA 250 (0–1)	Finals by surface Carpet (0–1)

Result	Date	Tournament	Tier	Surface	Partner	Opponents	Score
Loss	Sep 2017	Tournoi de Québec, Canada	International	Carpet (i)	(Canada) Bianca Andreescu	(Hungary) Tímea Babos (Czech Republic) Andrea Hlaváčková	3–6, 1–6

== WTA 125 finals ==
=== Singles: 1 (runner-up) ===
Result	Date	Tournament	Surface	Opponent	Score
Loss	Feb 2025	Cancún Open, México	Hard	(Colombia) Emiliana Arango	2–6, 1–6

== ITF Circuit finals ==
=== Singles: 12 (7 titles, 5 runner-ups) ===
Legend W75 tournaments W50 tournaments W25/35 tournaments W15 tournaments	Finals by surface Hard (5–3) Clay (2–2)

Result	W–L	Date	Tournament	Tier	Surface	Opponent	Score
Loss	0–1	Mar 2019	ITF Carson, United States	W15	Hard	(United States) Elizabeth Mandlik	2–6, 6–2, 4–6
Loss	0–2	Jul 2019	Challenger de Gatineau, Canada	W25	Hard	(Canada) Leylah Fernandez	6–3, 1–6, 2–6
Win	1–2	Nov 2021	ITF Cairo, Egypt	W15	Clay	(Indonesia) Priska Madelyn Nugroho	7–6^{(6)}, 6–1
Loss	1–3	Sep 2022	ITF Lubbock, United States	W15	Hard	(United States) Liv Hovde	6–7^{(2)}, 1–6
Win	2–3	Nov 2023	ITF Monastir, Tunisia	W15	Hard	(United Kingdom) Ranah Stoiber	7–5, 4–6, 6–3
Win	3–3	Nov 2023	ITF Monastir, Tunisia	W15	Hard	(Germany) Emily Welker	6–2, 6–3
Win	4–3	Jan 2024	ITF Monastir, Tunisia	W35	Hard	(Andorra) Victoria Jiménez Kasintseva	6–2, 6–2
Loss	4–4	Feb 2024	ITF Antalya, Turkiye	W35	Clay	(Romania) Cristina Dinu	3–6, 0–3 ret.
Loss	4–5	Apr 2024	ITF Hammamet, Tunisia	W35	Clay	(France) Sara Cakarevic	3–6, 1–6
Win	5–5	Jun 2024	Sumter Open, United States	W75	Hard	(United States) Sophie Chang	7–6^{(6)}, 6–7^{(6)}, 6–1
Win	6–5	Aug 2024	Vrnjačka Banja Open, Serbia	W35	Clay	(Serbia) Lola Radivojević	7–6^{(5)}, 6–4
Win	7–5	Mar 2025	ITF Santo Domingo, Dominican Republic	W50	Hard	(Mexico) Ana Sofía Sánchez	6–1, 6–3

=== Doubles: 3 (3 titles) ===
Legend W25/35 tournaments W15 tournaments	Finals by surface Hard (2–0) Clay (1–0)

Result	W–L	Date	Tournament	Tier	Surface	Partner	Opponents	Score
Win	1–0	Jul 2018	Challenger de Gatineau, Canada	W25	Hard	(Canada) Bianca Andreescu	(Chinese Taipei) Hsu Chieh-yu (Mexico) Marcela Zacarías	4–6, 6–2, [10–4]
Win	2–0	Nov 2023	ITF Monastir, Tunisia	W15	Hard	(Germany) Selina Dal	(Belgium) Eliessa Vanlangendonck (Germany) Emily Welker	3–6, 7–5, [10–8]
Win	3–0	Apr 2024	ITF Hammamet, Tunisia	W35	Clay	(Russia) Ekaterina Reyngold	(France) Émeline Dartron (France) Margaux Rouvroy	6–3, 6–0

== Junior Grand Slam tournament finals ==
=== Doubles: 2 (2 titles) ===
Result	Year	Tournament	Surface	Partner	Opponents	Score
Win	2017	Australian Open	Hard	(Canada) Bianca Andreescu	(Poland) Maja Chwalińska (Poland) Iga Świątek	6–1, 7–6^{(4)}
Win	2017	French Open	Clay	(Canada) Bianca Andreescu	(Russia) Olesya Pervushina (Russia) Anastasia Potapova	6–1, 6–3
