= Maya Joint =

Australian tennis player (born 2006)

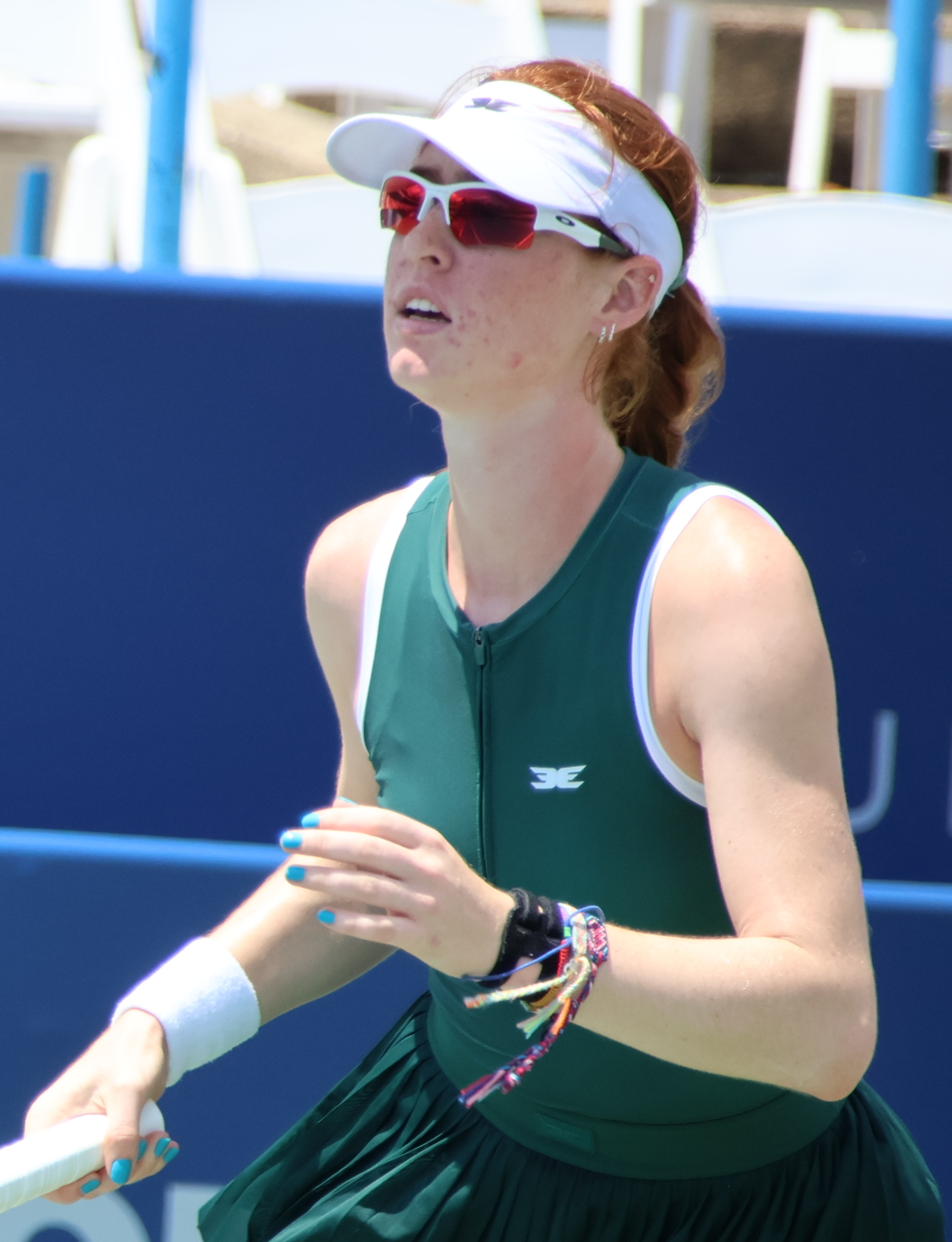
- Joint at the 2025 Washington Open
- Country (sports): United States (2021–2023); Australia (2023–)
- Born: 16 April 2006 (age 20) Grosse Pointe, Michigan, US
- Height: 1.67 m (5 ft 6 in)
- Plays: Right (two-handed backhand)
- Coach: Chris Mahony
- Prize money: $2,592,793

Singles
- Career record: 146–94
- Career titles: 2
- Highest ranking: No. 28 (16 February 2026)
- Current ranking: No. 94 (26 October 2026)

Grand Slam singles results
- Australian Open: 1R (2025, 2026)
- French Open: 1R (2025, 2026)
- Wimbledon: 2R (2026)
- US Open: 2R (2024, 2025, 2026)

Doubles
- Career record: 79–53
- Career titles: 3
- Highest ranking: No. 26 (14 September 2026)
- Current ranking: No. 29 (26 October 2026)

Grand Slam doubles results
- Australian Open: 3R (2026)
- French Open: 2R (2025, 2026)
- Wimbledon: 3R (2025)
- US Open: 3R (2026)

Grand Slam mixed doubles results
- Australian Open: 2R (2026)
- Last updated on: 26 October 2026.

Maya Joint (born 16 April 2006) is an American-born Australian professional tennis player. She has a career-high singles ranking of No. 28 by the WTA, achieved on 16 February 2026, and a best in doubles of No. 26, reached on 14 September 2026. Joint has won five WTA Tour combined titles, two in singles and three in doubles. She represents Australia in the Billie Jean King Cup.

== Early life ==
Joint was born in Grosse Pointe, Michigan to an Australian father, Michael (Mick) Joint, and a German mother, Katja Joint. Her father left Australia at 19 years of age to pursue a professional squash career, which included stints in Argentina, Canada and Germany, where he met his future wife, who played squash, tennis, and badminton competitively in Germany. The couple settled in Detroit in 2004, two years before their daughter Maya was born, and moved back to Australia in 2025 when Mick accepted a coaching role at the MCC Squash Club.

Joint began playing tennis in kindergarten at the local Michigan courts when she would hit tennis balls with her father using a squash racquet. A dual citizen of Australia and the United States from birth, Joint was showing promising signs while competing on the ITF junior circuit and at 15 years of age began contemplating whether to switch allegiances for greater support. In mid-2023, at 17 years of age, she officially made the decision to start representing her father's country of Australia and relocated to Brisbane for better development opportunities by training at Tennis Australia's National Academy (Queensland) with the likes of top 60 WTA players Kim Birrell and Ajla Tomljanović as well as junior world No. 1, Emerson Jones. Shortly after her 19th birthday, Joint permanently moved to Melbourne in mid-2025.

== College and juniors ==
In November 2023, Joint committed to the Texas Longhorns tennis team starting from the 2024/25 season. In August 2024, she was controversially required to forfeit $140,000 in US Open prize money to maintain NCAA eligibility. The ruling was widely criticised and described by American tennis great Andy Roddick as "absurd". On 26 December 2024, Joint announced she would turn professional and forgo her college tennis opportunity.

On the ITF Junior Circuit, Joint had a combined ranking of No. 20, achieved on 29 January 2024.

== Career ==
=== 2021-23: Professional debut, first ITF title ===
Joint competed in her first professional tournament at 14 years of age in February 2021 at a W25 event in Orlando, Florida but was eliminated in the first round of qualifying. She returned to the professional tour in November 2022 as a 16 year old and qualified for a W15 event in Waco, Texas, and then won her first professional main-draw match by defeating Ukrainian Hanna Poznikhirenko, before losing in the second round to Tian Fangran.

As a wildcard entrant at the W60 Sydney Challenger event in November 2023, Joint reached her first professional semifinal and was defeated by sixth seed Destanee Aiava in three sets. She won her first ITF title a month later at the Gold Coast Tennis International in the doubles, partnering Roisin Gilheany.

=== 2024: Major debut and first win ===
Joint made her Grand Slam tournament debut at the Australian Open, in mixed doubles with Dane Sweeny as a wildcard pair. In February, at 17 years of age, Joint became the youngest Australian player ever to win a W75 singles title, defeating Aoi Ito at Burnie.

In July, she finished runner-up at the WTA 125 Polish Open defeating Maja Chwalińska in the semifinals, before losing in the final to Alycia Parks. Ranked at No. 136, she made her major singles debut at the US Open after qualifying and defeated Laura Siegemund. She lost in the second round to 14th seed Madison Keys in straight sets.

=== 2025: Two WTA Tour titles, top 40 ===
Having announced her decision to turn professional, Joint began the 2025 season with a victory over fellow Australian Maddison Inglis at the Brisbane International, before falling to 10th seed Victoria Azarenka in three sets in the second round. The following week, she reached her first WTA semifinal at the Hobart International by defeating Olga Danilović and then fourth seed Magda Linette for her maiden win against a top-50 ranked player, before overcoming wildcard entrant Sofia Kenin in the quarterfinals. She lost in the last four to second seed Elise Mertens. Joint was given a wildcard entry into the main draw at the Australian Open, but lost to seventh seed Jessica Pegula in the first round.

Partnering Taylah Preston, Joint won her first WTA 125 doubles title at the Cancún Open, defeating Aliona Bolsova and Yvonne Cavallé Reimers in the final. Joint qualified for the main draw at the Mérida Open and defeated Julia Grabher. As a result, Joint reached on 3 March 2025 the top 100 in the singles rankings for the first time in her career, becoming only the second teenager in the top 100, at the age of 18 (and second youngest after Mirra Andreeva). She defeated world No. 20 and fifth seed Donna Vekić, conceding only three games, to make it through to her first WTA 500 quarterfinal. Joint won the first set of her last eight encounter against Elina Avanesyan but ultimately lost the match, getting bagelled in the deciding set. Despite the defeat she rose into the top 85 in the rankings.

In March, Joint qualified for the WTA 1000 tournament at Indian Wells. She lost to Sorana Cîrstea in the first round. She made her debut for the Australia Billie Jean King Cup team against Kazakhstan in the 2025 qualifying round held in Brisbane in April, losing to Yulia Putintseva in the opening singles match. She then defeated Yuliana Monroy as Australia beat Colombia, although it was not enough to see them progress to the finals.

After qualifying for the Madrid Open, Joint overcame wildcard entrant Carlota Martínez Círez to secure her first WTA Tour main draw clay-court win. Aged 19 years and five days at the time, the victory also made her the youngest Australian to win a WTA 1000 match, breaking the previous record of 20 years and 330 days set by Ashleigh Barty at the 2017 Miami Open. Joint lost to 11th seed Emma Navarro in the second round. She qualified for the Italian Open, but lost to Emma Raducanu in the first round.

In May at the Morocco Open, Joint won her first WTA Tour title, defeating Jaqueline Cristian in straight sets in the final. She and partner Oksana Kalashnikova won the doubles at the same tournament, overcoming Angelica Moratelli and Camilla Rosatello in the championship match. As a result, Joint rose to new career-high rankings of world No. 53 in singles and No. 107 in doubles on 26 May 2025. That same day, she made her French Open debut but lost to fellow Australian Ajla Tomljanović, in straight sets.

Moving onto the grass-court season at the Eastbourne Open, Joint defeated Ons Jabeur, seventh seed Emma Raducanu, Anna Blinkova and Anastasia Pavlyuchenkova to reach the final, which she won against Alexandra Eala in three sets, saving four match points in the process, to claim her second career singles title. Three days later, she made her main-draw debut at Wimbledon, losing to 19th seed Liudmila Samsonova in the first round.

At the Cincinnati Open in August, Joint defeated Greet Minnen and 18th seed Beatriz Haddad Maia to reach the third round, where her run was ended by 12th seed Ekaterina Alexandrova, in straight sets. She recorded a straight sets win over qualifier Victoria Jiménez Kasintseva to make it into the second round at the US Open, at which point she lost to eighth seed Amanda Anisimova.

In September, Joint defeated qualifier Linda Fruhvirtová, seventh seed Sofia Kenin and third seed Clara Tauson to reach the semifinals at the Korea Open. She lost in the last four to top seed Iga Świątek. Partnering Caty McNally, she was runner-up in the doubles at the tournament, losing to Barbora Krejčíková and Kateřina Siniaková in the final. The following week at the China Open, Joint overcame qualifier Victoria Jiménez Kasintseva and 17th seed Diana Shnaider to make it into the third round, where she lost to Sonay Kartal.

Seeded fifth at the Hong Kong Open in October, Joint defeated Anastasija Sevastova, Viktória Morvayová and Himeno Sakatsume to reach the semifinals, at which point she lost to Cristina Bucșa.

Playing for Australia in the BJK Cup play-offs in Hobart the following month, Joint recorded wins over Francisca Jorge and Laura Pigossi as her team defeated Portugal and Brazil, respectively, to top their group and advance to the 2026 qualifying round.

=== 2026: Two WTA 500 doubles titles, Korea singles final ===
Joint began her 2026 campaign at the United Cup where she represented Australia alongside ATP world No. 6, Alex de Minaur. They were eliminated in the quarterfinals by the eventual champions Poland where Joint was defeated in her match against world No. 2 Iga Świątek, after falling ill on the eve of the tournament. Next she competed at the Adelaide International and defeated 2020 Australian Open champion Sofia Kenin and Ajla Tomljanović to reach the quarterfinals, at which point she lost to third seed and eventual champion Mirra Andreeva. Joint was seeded 30th at the Australian Open, making her the first Australian seed at the tournament since Ashleigh Barty in 2022. She lost in the first round to Tereza Valentová.

In February, Joint teamed up with Ekaterina Alexandrova at the Abu Dhabi Open to win her first WTA 500 doubles title. In the championship match, which was repeatedly interrupted by rain and complicated by the fact that Alexandrova had played, and lost, in the singles final earlier in the day, they defeated Tereza Mihalíková and Olivia Nicholls in a super tiebreak.

Defending her title at the Eastbourne Open in June, Joint lost to Emiliana Arango in the first round to suffer her 11th consecutive WTA Tour singles defeat and drop out of the world's top 80 as a result. At Wimbledon, she ended her losing run by recording the most high-profile singles victory of her career, defeating 23-time Grand Slam tournament singles champion Serena Williams in the first round. The match marked Williams' first singles appearance since the 2022 US Open. Joint lost in the second round to 29th seed Alexandra Eala, in three sets.

Partnering Chan Hao-ching, she reached the doubles final at the Memphis Classic, losing to Maria Kozyreva and Maia Lumsden in straight sets. The following week, having qualified for the main-draw at the Canadian Open, Joint defeated Yuliia Starodubtseva and 14th seed Sorana Cîrstea, before losing in the third round to Liudmila Samsonova in three sets. Teaming up with Xu Yifan, she won the doubles title at the WTA 500 Monterrey Open, defeating Maria Kozyreva and Maia Lumsden in the final. At the US Open, Joint overcame Liudmila Samsonova to reach the second round, where she lost to ninth seed Elina Svitolina.

Seeded fifth at the Korea Open, she defeated qualifier Yao Xinxin, wildcard entrant Back Da-yeon, third seed Lanlana Tararudee and Alina Korneeva to reach the final, where she lost to fellow Australian and second seed Kimberly Birrell. Having qualified for the main-draw at the Pan Pacific Open, Joint recorded wins over sixth seed Sorana Cîrstea and Cristina Bucșa to make it through to the quarterfinals, where her run was ended by lucky loser Kamilla Rakhimova.

== Sponsorships and endorsements ==
Joint is currently sponsored by the Australian sportswear brand Elite Eleven.

== Performance timelines ==
Key
W	F	SF	QF	#R	RR	Q#	P#	DNQ	A	Z#	PO	G	S	B	NMS	NTI	P	NH

(W) winner; (F) finalist; (SF) semifinalist; (QF) quarterfinalist; (#R) rounds 4, 3, 2, 1; (RR) round-robin stage; (Q#) qualification round; (P#) preliminary round; (DNQ) did not qualify; (A) absent; (Z#) Davis/Fed Cup Zonal Group (with number indication) or (PO) play-off; (G) gold, (S) silver or (B) bronze Olympic/Paralympic medal; (NMS) not a Masters tournament; (NTI) not a Tier I tournament; (P) postponed; (NH) not held; (SR) strike rate (events won / competed); (W–L) win–loss record.
To avoid confusion and double counting, these charts are updated at the conclusion of a tournament or when the player's participation has ended.

=== Singles ===
Current through the 2026 Korea Open.

Tournament	2024	2025	2026	SR	W–L	Win%
Grand Slam tournaments
Australian Open	Q3	1R	1R	0 / 2	0–2	0%
French Open	A	1R	1R	0 / 2	0–2	0%
Wimbledon	Q2	1R	2R	0 / 2	1–2	33%
US Open	2R	2R	2R	0 / 3	3–3	50%
Win–Loss	1–1	1–4	2–4	0 / 9	4–9	31%
WTA 1000 tournaments
Qatar Open	A	A	1R	0 / 1	0–1	0%
Dubai Championships	A	A	1R	0 / 1	0–1	0%
Indian Wells Open	A	1R	2R	0 / 2	0–2	0%
Miami Open	A	Q2	A	0 / 0	0–0	–
Madrid Open	A	2R	A	0 / 1	1–1	50%
Italian Open	A	1R	2R	0 / 2	0–2	0%
Canadian Open	A	2R	3R	0 / 2	3–3	50%
Cincinnati Open	A	3R	1R	0 / 2	2–2	50%
Win–Loss	0–0	4–8	4–6	0 / 14	6–14	30%
Career statistics
Tournaments	2	17	9	Career total: 28		
Titles	0	2	0	Career total: 2		
Finals	0	2	0	Career total: 2		
Overall win–loss	1–2	29–17	3–10	1 / 28	33–29	53%
Year-end ranking	119	32		$2,520,793		

=== Doubles ===
Current through the 2026 US Open.

Tournament	2025	2026	SR	W–L	Win %
Grand Slam tournaments
Australian Open	1R	3R	0 / 2	2–2	50%
French Open	2R	2R	0 / 2	2–2	50%
Wimbledon	3R	2R	0 / 2	3–2	60%
US Open	1R	3R	0 / 2	2–2	50%
Win–Loss	3–4	6–4	0 / 8	9–8	53%
WTA 1000 tournaments
Qatar Open			0 / 0	0–0	–
Dubai Championships			0 / 0	0–0	–
Indian Wells Open			0 / 0	0–0	–
Miami Open			0 / 0	0–0	–
Madrid Open			0 / 0	0–0	–
Italian Open			0 / 0	0–0	–
Canadian Open	2R		0 / 1	1–1	50%
Cincinnati Open			0 / 0	0–0	–
China Open	1R		0 / 1	0–1	0%
Wuhan Open	1R		0 / 1	0–1	0%
Win–Loss			0 / 0	0–0	–
Career statistics
Tournaments			Career total:		
Titles			Career total:		
Finals			Career total:		
Overall win–loss					
Year-end ranking					

== WTA Tour finals ==
=== Singles: 3 (2 titles, 1 runner-up) ===
Legend WTA 1000 WTA 500 WTA 250 (2–1)	Finals by surface Clay (1–0) Grass (1–0) Hard (0–1)	Finals by setting Outdoor (2–1)

Result	W–L	Date	Tournament	Tier	Surface	Opponent	Score
Win	1–0	May 2025	Rabat Grand Prix, Morocco	WTA 250	Clay	(Romania) Jaqueline Cristian	6–3, 6–2
Win	2–0	Jun 2025	Eastbourne Open, UK	WTA 250	Grass	(Philippines) Alexandra Eala	6–4, 1–6, 7–6^{(12–10)}
Loss	2–1	Sep 2026	Korea Open, South Korea	WTA 250	Hard	(Australia) Kimberly Birrell	4–6, 2–6

=== Doubles: 6 (3 titles, 3 runner-ups) ===
Legend WTA 1000 WTA 500 (2–1) WTA 250 (1–2)	Finals by surface Hard (2–2) Clay (1–0) Grass (0–1)	Finals by setting Outdoor (3–3)

Result	W–L	Date	Tournament	Tier	Surface	Partner	Opponents	Score
Win	1–0	May 2025	Rabat Grand Prix, Morocco	WTA 250	Clay	(Georgia (country)) Oksana Kalashnikova	(Italy) Angelica Moratelli (Italy) Camilla Rosatello	6–3, 7–5
Loss	1–1	Jun 2025	Eastbourne Open, UK	WTA 250	Grass	(Chinese Taipei) Hsieh Su-wei	(Czech Republic) Marie Bouzková (Kazakhstan) Anna Danilina	4–6, 5–7
Loss	1–2	Sep 2025	Korea Open, South Korea	WTA 500	Hard	(United States) Caty McNally	(Czech Republic) Barbora Krejčíková (Czech Republic) Kateřina Siniaková	3–6, 6–7^{(6–8)}
Win	2–2	Feb 2026	Abu Dhabi Open, UAE	WTA 500	Hard	Ekaterina Alexandrova	(Slovakia) Tereza Mihalíková (United Kingdom) Olivia Nicholls	3–6, 7–6^{(7–5)}, [10–8]
Loss	2–3	Jul 2026	Memphis Classic, US	WTA 250	Hard	(Chinese Taipei) Chan Hao-ching	Maria Kozyreva (United Kingdom) Maia Lumsden	6–7^{(6–8)}, 3–6
Win	3–3	Aug 2026	Monterrey Open, Mexico	WTA 500	Hard	(China) Xu Yifan	Maria Kozyreva (United Kingdom) Maia Lumsden	6–2, 4–6, [10–5]

== WTA 125 finals ==
=== Singles: 1 (runner-up) ===
Result	Date	Tournament	Surface	Opponent	Score
Loss	Jul 2024	Kozerki Open, Poland	Hard	(United States) Alycia Parks	6–4, 3–6, 3–6

=== Doubles: 2 (1 title, 1 runner-up) ===
Result	W–L	Date	Tournament	Surface	Partner	Opponents	Score
Win	1–0	Feb 2025	Cancún Open, Mexico	Hard	(Australia) Taylah Preston	(Spain) Aliona Bolsova (Spain) Yvonne Cavallé Reimers	6–4, 6–3
Loss	1–1	Mar 2025	Puerto Vallarta Open, Mexico	Hard	(Japan) Ena Shibahara	(United States) Hanna Chang (United States) Christina McHale	6–2, 2–6, [7–10]

== ITF Circuit finals ==
=== Singles: 3 (2 titles, 1 runner-up) ===
Legend W100 tournaments (0–1) W75 tournaments (1–0) W35 tournaments (1–0)	Finals by surface Hard (2–0) Clay (0–1)

Result	W–L	Date	Tournament	Tier	Surface	Opponent	Score
Win	1–0	Feb 2024	Burnie International, Australia	W75	Hard	(Japan) Aoi Ito	1–6, 6–1, 7–5
Win	2–0	Mar 2024	ITF Santo Domingo, Dominican Rep.	W35	Hard	(China) Gao Xinyu	6–4, 2–6, 6–1
Loss	2–1	May 2024	Bonita Springs Championship, US	W100	Clay	(New Zealand) Lulu Sun	1–6, 3–6

=== Doubles: 3 (1 title, 2 runner-ups) ===
Legend W60 tournaments (1–0) W50 tournaments (0–1) W25 tournaments (0–1)	Finals by surface Hard (1–1) Clay (0–1)

Result	W–L	Date	Tournament	Tier	Surface	Partner	Opponents	Score
Loss	0–1	Feb 2023	ITF Toronto, Canada	W25	Hard (i)	(United States) Mia Yamakita	(Norway) Ulrikke Eikeri (Hungary) Fanny Stollár	6–7^{(6)}, 0–6
Win	1–1	Nov 2023	Gold Coast International, Australia	W60	Hard	(Australia) Roisin Gilheany	(Australia) Melisa Ercan (Australia) Alicia Smith	7–6^{(3)}, 6–1
Loss	1–2	May 2024	ITF Otočec, Slovenia	W50	Clay	(United States) Rasheeda McAdoo	(Georgia (country)) Ekaterine Gorgodze (Ukraine) Valeriya Strakhova	6–3, 4–6, [5–10]

== Best Grand Slam results details ==
=== Singles ===
Australian Open
2025 Australian Open (wildcard)
Round	Opponent	Rank	Score	MJR
1R	(United States) Jessica Pegula (7)	6	3–6, 0–6	105
2026 Australian Open (30th seed)
Round	Opponent	Rank	Score	MJR
1R	(Czech Republic) Tereza Valentová	54	4–6, 4–6	31

Wimbledon Championships
2026 Wimbledon
Round	Opponent	Rank	Score	MJR
1R	(United States) Serena Williams (WC)	n/a	6–3, 6–7^{(6–8)}, 6–3	87
2R	(Philippines) Alexandra Eala (29)	32	6–3, 2–6, 0–6	87

French Open
2025 French Open
Round	Opponent	Rank	Score	MJR
1R	(Australia) Ajla Tomljanović	71	1–6, 3–6	53
2026 French Open
Round	Opponent	Rank	Score	MJR
1R	(Austria) Anastasia Potapova (28)	30	1–6, 2–6	52

US Open
2024 US Open (qualifier)
Round	Opponent	Rank	Score	MJR
Q1	(Poland) Maja Chwalińska	174	6–0, 6–3	136
Q2	Iryna Shymanovich	214	7–5, 3–6, 6–0	136
Q3	(United States) Hailey Baptiste (3)	106	6–2, 6–1	136
1R	(Germany) Laura Siegemund	94	6–4, 7–5	135
2R	(United States) Madison Keys (14)	14	4–6, 0–6	135
2025 US Open
Round	Opponent	Rank	Score	MJR
1R	(Andorra) Victoria Jiménez Kasintseva (Q)	130	6–4, 7–6^{(8–6)}	43
2R	(United States) Amanda Anisimova (8)	9	6–7^{(2–7)}, 2–6	43
