= Taylah Preston =

Australian tennis player (born 2005)

- Preston at the 2026 Wimbledon Championships
- Country (sports): Australia
- Residence: Perth, Australia
- Born: 27 October 2005 (age 21) Joondalup
- Height: 1.70 m (5 ft 7 in)
- Turned pro: 2020
- Plays: Right (two-handed backhand)
- Coach: Brett Hunterv
- Prize money: $1,157,492

Singles
- Career record: 169–101
- Career titles: 1 WTA 125
- Highest ranking: No. 83 (2 November 2026)
- Current ranking: No. 83 (2 November 2026)

Grand Slam singles results
- Australian Open: 2R (2026)
- French Open: Q2 (2024)
- Wimbledon: Q1 (2024, 2025, 2026)
- US Open: 2R (2026)

Doubles
- Career record: 38–35
- Career titles: 1 WTA 125
- Highest ranking: No. 175 (28 July 2025)
- Current ranking: No. 317 (2 November 2026)

Grand Slam doubles results
- Australian Open: 2R (2024, 2026)

Grand Slam mixed doubles results
- Australian Open: 1R (2025, 2026)
- Last updated on: 23 October 2026.

Taylah Preston (born 27 October 2005) is an Australian professional tennis player. She has a career-high WTA singles ranking of world No. 83, achieved on 2 November 2026, and a best in doubles of No. 175, achieved on 28 July 2025. Preston has won two WTA 125 titles, one in singles and one in doubles.

As a junior, Preston reached a career-high combined ranking of No. 10.

== Career ==
=== 2022–2023: WTA Tour debut, first ITF titles ===
In January 2022, Preston received a wildcard into the qualifying draw for the Melbourne Summer Set 1, where she defeated former French Open finalist, Sara Errani, before falling in the final qualifying round. She made her WTA Tour main-draw doubles debut at the 2022 Melbourne Summer Set 2, where she also received a wildcard partnering Alexandra Osborne. Preston lost in the second round of the Australian Open qualifying.

Preston made her WTA Tour main-draw singles debut at the 2022 Rosmalen Grass Court Championships as a qualifier. She lost to wildcard entrant Arianne Hartono in the first round.

In 2023, Preston won four singles titles: at the W25 Monastir, W25 Perth, W25 Cairns tournaments and the W60 Brisbane QTC International.

=== 2024: Major debut, WTA 125 final ===
Preston received a wildcard entry for her major debut at the Australian Open but went out in the first round to Elina Svitolina.

In February, she reached her first WTA 125 final at Puerto Vallarta in Mexico, losing in three sets to McCartney Kessler. Later that month at the San Diego Open, having been given a wildcard entry, she defeated world No. 42, Magdalena Fręch, to win her first Tour-level match and also her first against a player ranked in the WTA top 50. She lost her next match to sixth seed Marta Kostyuk.

Preston was given a wildcard entry to make her maiden appearance at the US Open in August but lost in the first round to 25th seed Anastasia Pavlyuchenkova.

=== 2025: First WTA 125 doubles title ===
Preston reached the quarterfinals of the Canberra International but lost to Alexandra Eala.

Partnering Maya Joint, Preston won her first WTA 125 doubles title at the Cancún Open, defeating Aliona Bolsova and Yvonne Cavallé Reimers in the final.

=== 2026: WTA Tour semifinal, WTA 125 singles title, top 100 ===
Preston received a wildcard entry into the Hobart International in which she reached her first tour-level semifinal, defeating fifth seed Jéssica Bouzas Maneiro and Rebecca Šramková before causing an upset against top seed Emma Raducanu in the quarterfinals. Raducanu, then-ranked No. 29, was Preston's first ever top-30 win and the highest-ranked opponent she had beaten to date. Preston lost to third seed Iva Jovic in the semifinal.

Having been given a wildcard entry into the main draw at the Australian Open, Preston defeated Zhang Shuai for her first major match win, before losing to 13th seed Linda Nosková in the second round.

In August, Preston won her first WTA 125 singles title at the Vancouver Open, defeating fellow Australian player Maddison Inglis in the final. She reached a new career high WTA ranking of world No. 100 on 24 August 2026.

Entering the main draw as a wildcard at the US Open, Preston overcame Alycia Parks for her first win at this major, before losing to Taylor Townsend in the second round.

At the Korea Open, she defeated Himeno Sakatsume and top seed Jeļena Ostapenko to make a through to the quarterfinals, where she lost to sixth seed Anna Bondár. The following week at the China Open, Preston recorded wins over Tamara Korpatsch and 22nd seed Diane Parry to reach the third round of a WTA 1000 tournament for the first time, at which point her run was ended by Daria Snigur.

== Performance timeline ==
Key
W	F	SF	QF	#R	RR	Q#	P#	DNQ	A	Z#	PO	G	S	B	NMS	NTI	P	NH

(W) winner; (F) finalist; (SF) semifinalist; (QF) quarterfinalist; (#R) rounds 4, 3, 2, 1; (RR) round-robin stage; (Q#) qualification round; (P#) preliminary round; (DNQ) did not qualify; (A) absent; (Z#) Davis/Fed Cup Zonal Group (with number indication) or (PO) play-off; (G) gold, (S) silver or (B) bronze Olympic/Paralympic medal; (NMS) not a Masters tournament; (NTI) not a Tier I tournament; (P) postponed; (NH) not held; (SR) strike rate (events won / competed); (W–L) win–loss record.
To avoid confusion and double counting, these charts are updated at the conclusion of a tournament or when the player's participation has ended.

=== Singles ===
Tournament	2022	2023	2024	2025	2026	W–L
Grand Slam tournaments
Australian Open	Q2	A	1R	Q2	2R	1–2
French Open	A	A	Q2	Q1	Q1	0–0
Wimbledon	A	A	Q1	Q1	Q1	0–0
US Open	A	A	1R	A	2R	1–2
Win–Loss	0–0	0–0	0–2	0–0	2–2	2–4
WTA 1000 tournaments
Madrid Open	A	A	Q1	A	A	0–0
Italian Open	A	A	Q2	A	A	0–0
Cincinnati Open	A	A	A	A	Q1	0–0
China Open	A	A	A	A	3R	2–1
Wuhan Open	A	A	A	A	Q1	0–0
Win–Loss	0–0	0–0	0–0	0–0	2–1	2–1

== WTA 125 finals ==
=== Singles: 2 (1 title, 1 runner-up) ===
Result	W–L	Date	Tournament	Surface	Opponent	Score
Loss	0–1	Feb 2024	Puerto Vallarta Open, Mexico	Hard	(United States) McCartney Kessler	7–5, 3–6, 0–6
Win	1–1	Aug 2026	Vancouver Open, Canada	Hard	(Australia) Maddison Inglis	7–6^{(7–5)}, 6–3

=== Doubles: 1 (title) ===
Result	W–L	Date	Tournament	Surface	Partner	Opponents	Score
Win	1–0	Feb 2025	Cancún Open, Mexico	Hard	(Australia) Maya Joint	(Spain) Aliona Bolsova (Spain) Yvonne Cavallé Reimers	6–4, 6–3

== ITF Circuit finals ==
=== Singles: 11 (8 titles, 3 runner-ups) ===
Legend W100 tournaments (1–0) W60/75 tournaments (1–1) W25/35 tournaments (6–2)	Finals by surface Hard (8–3)

Result	W–L	Date	Tournament	Tier	Surface	Opponent	Score
Loss	0–1	May 2023	ITF Nottingham, UK	W25	Hard	(United Kingdom) Harriet Dart	0–6, 2–6
Win	1–1	May 2023	ITF Monastir, Tunisia	W25	Hard	(Czech Republic) Gabriela Knutson	3-6, 7–6^{(5)}, 6–3
Win	2–1	Sep 2023	ITF Perth, Australia	W25	Hard	(Australia) Talia Gibson	7–5, 6–1
Win	3–1	Oct 2023	ITF Cairns, Australia	W25	Hard	(Japan) Yuki Naito	6–4, 6–4
Win	4–1	Nov 2023	Brisbane QTC International, Australia	W60	Hard	(Russia) Darya Astakhova	6–3, 6–4
Loss	4–2	Oct 2024	Sydney Challenger, Australia	W75	Hard	(Australia) Emerson Jones	4–6, 6–7^{(3)}
Loss	4–3	Sep 2025	ITF Wagga Wagga, Australia	W35	Hard	(United Kingdom) Katie Swan	1–6, 2–6
Win	5–3	Sep 2025	ITF Wagga Wagga, Australia	W35	Hard	(United Kingdom) Katie Swan	6–4, 7–6^{(5)}
Win	6–3	Sep 2025	ITF Darwin, Australia	W35	Hard	(Japan) Shiho Akita	7–6^{(3)}, 6–3
Win	7–3	Oct 2025	Brisbane QTC International, Australia	W35	Hard	(Japan) Natsumi Kawaguchi	6–2, 6–4
Win	8–3	Apr 2026	Tokyo Open, Japan	W100	Hard	(Thailand) Lanlana Tararudee	6–1, 4–6, 6–4

=== Doubles: 6 (2 titles, 4 runner-ups) ===
Legend W75 tournaments (1–2) W25 tournaments (1–2)	Finals by surface Hard (2–4)

Result	W–L	Date	Tournament	Tier	Surface	Partner	Opponents	Score
Loss	0–1	Oct 2022	ITF Cairns, Australia	W25	Hard	(Australia) Alana Parnaby	(Australia) Talia Gibson (Australia) Petra Hule	1–6, 4–6
Loss	0–2	Sep 2023	ITF Perth, Australia	W25	Hard	(Australia) Talia Gibson	(Australia) Destanee Aiava (Australia) Maddison Inglis	3–6, 6–7^{(3)}
Win	1–2	Oct 2023	ITF Cairns, Australia	W25	Hard	(Australia) Destanee Aiava	(Australia) Roisin Gilheany (Australia) Alicia Smith	7–6^{(5)}, 7–5
Loss	1–3	Oct 2024	Playford International, Australia	W75	Hard	(Australia) Lizette Cabrera	(Australia) Alexandra Bozovic (Australia) Petra Hule	4–6, 3–6
Win	2–3	Oct 2024	Sydney Open, Australia	W75	Hard	(Australia) Lizette Cabrera	(Australia) Destanee Aiava (Australia) Maddison Inglis	6–1, 3–6, [10–8]
Loss	2–4	Jan 2025	Queensland International, Australia	W75	Hard	(Australia) Lizette Cabrera	(Australia) Petra Hule (Australia) Elena Micic	6–2, 2–6, [6–10]

== Exhibition matches ==
=== Singles ===
Result	Date	Tournament	Surface	Opponent	Score
Win	Jan 2024	Kooyong Classic, Australia	Hard	(Czech Republic) Linda Fruhvirtová	1–6, 7–6^{(4)}, [10–6]
