= Emiliana Arango =

Colombian tennis player (born 2000)

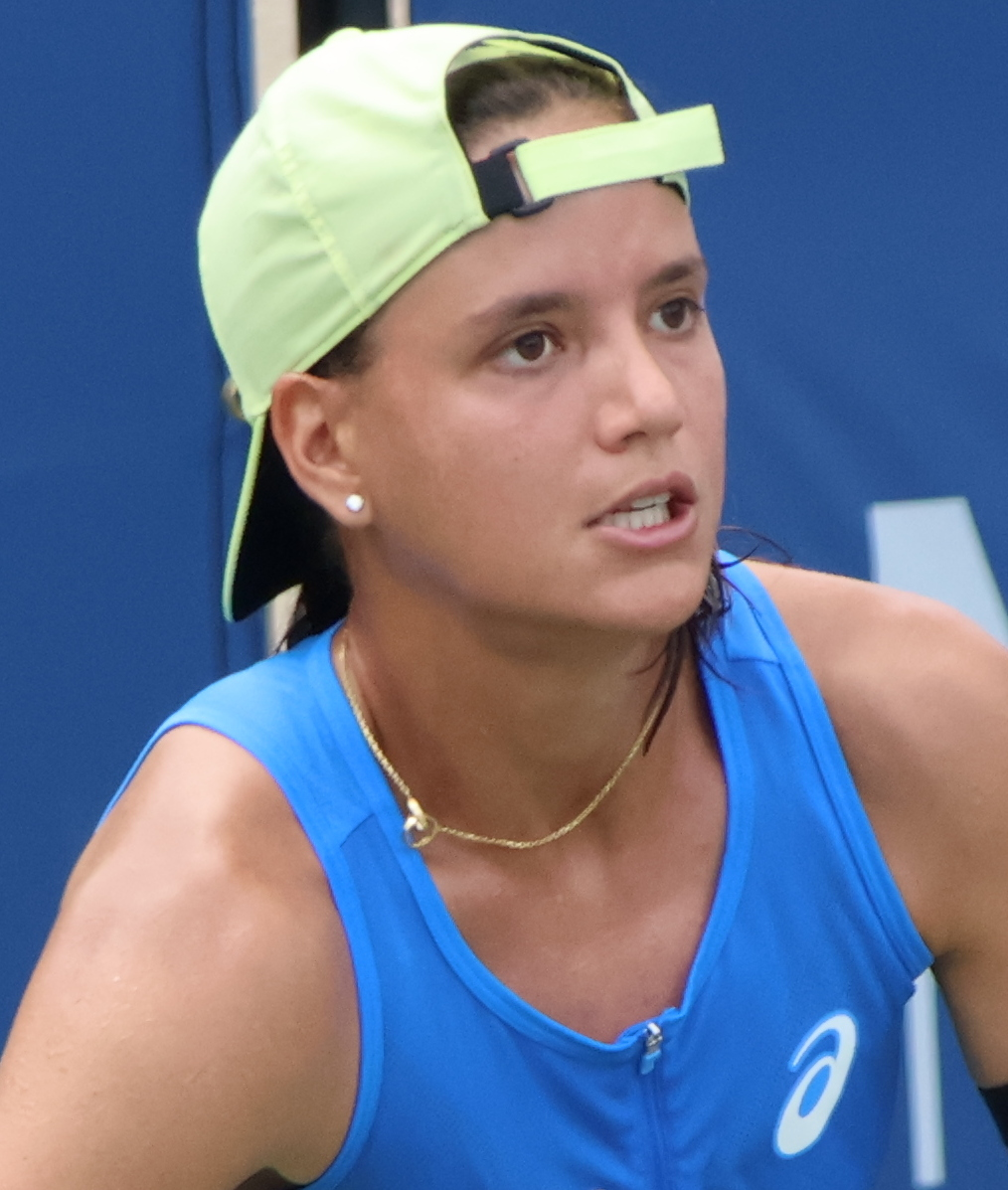
- Arango at the 2025 Mubadala Citi DC Open
- Full name: Emiliana Arango Restrepo
- Country (sports): Colombia
- Residence: Bradenton, Florida, US
- Born: 28 November 2000 (age 25) Medellín, Colombia
- Height: 1.72 m (5 ft 8 in)
- Plays: Right (two-handed backhand)
- Coach: Felipe Mantilla
- Prize money: US$ 1,707,769

Singles
- Career record: 242–199
- Career titles: 1 WTA 125
- Highest ranking: No. 46 (13 October 2025)
- Current ranking: No. 98 (3 August 2026)

Grand Slam singles results
- Australian Open: 1R (2026)
- French Open: 2R (2025)
- Wimbledon: 1R (2025, 2026)
- US Open: 1R (2025, 2026)

Doubles
- Career record: 27–38
- Career titles: 1 WTA 125
- Highest ranking: No. 187 (13 July 2026)
- Current ranking: No. 187 (13 July 2026)

Grand Slam doubles results
- Australian Open: 2R (2026)
- French Open: 2R (2026)

Team competitions
- BJK Cup: 12–10
- Last updated on: 27 June 2026.

Emiliana Arango Restrepo (Spanish pronunciation: [emiˈljana aˈɾaŋɡo]; born 28 November 2000) is a Colombian professional tennis player. She has a career-high singles ranking of world No. 46, achieved on 13 October 2025, and a best doubles ranking of No. 187, reached in July 2026. She is currently the No. 2 Colombian singles player.

Playing for Colombia Billie Jean King Cup team, Arango has a win–loss record of 12–10.

== Career ==
=== Junior years ===
On the ITF Junior Circuit, Arango has a career-high ranking of world No. 8, achieved in January 2018. In singles, she reached the semifinals at the 2017 Junior US Open. In doubles, she reached two quarterfinals, both in 2017, at Wimbledon and US Open, respectively. As a junior, she won three singles and three doubles titles.

==== Grand Slam performance ====
Singles

- Australian Open: –
- French Open: 2R (2017)
- Wimbledon: 1R (2016, 2017)
- US Open: SF (2017)

Doubles

- Australian Open: –
- French Open: 2R (2017)
- Wimbledon: QF (2017)
- US Open: QF (2017)

=== 2016-2018: WTA Tour debut and first win ===
Arango made her WTA Tour singles debut at the 2016 Copa Colsanitas, where she lost in the first round to Irina Falconi, winning only one game.

At the 2018 Copa Colsanitas, she secured her first tour-level win with a three-set victory over fourth seed Verónica Cepede Royg from Paraguay.

=== 2022: Major qualifying debut ===
Arango made her major debut at the French Open qualifying competition in 2022, and she also competed and lost in qualifying at the Wimbledon Championships.

=== 2023: WTA 1000 quarterfinal, top 125 year-end ranking ===
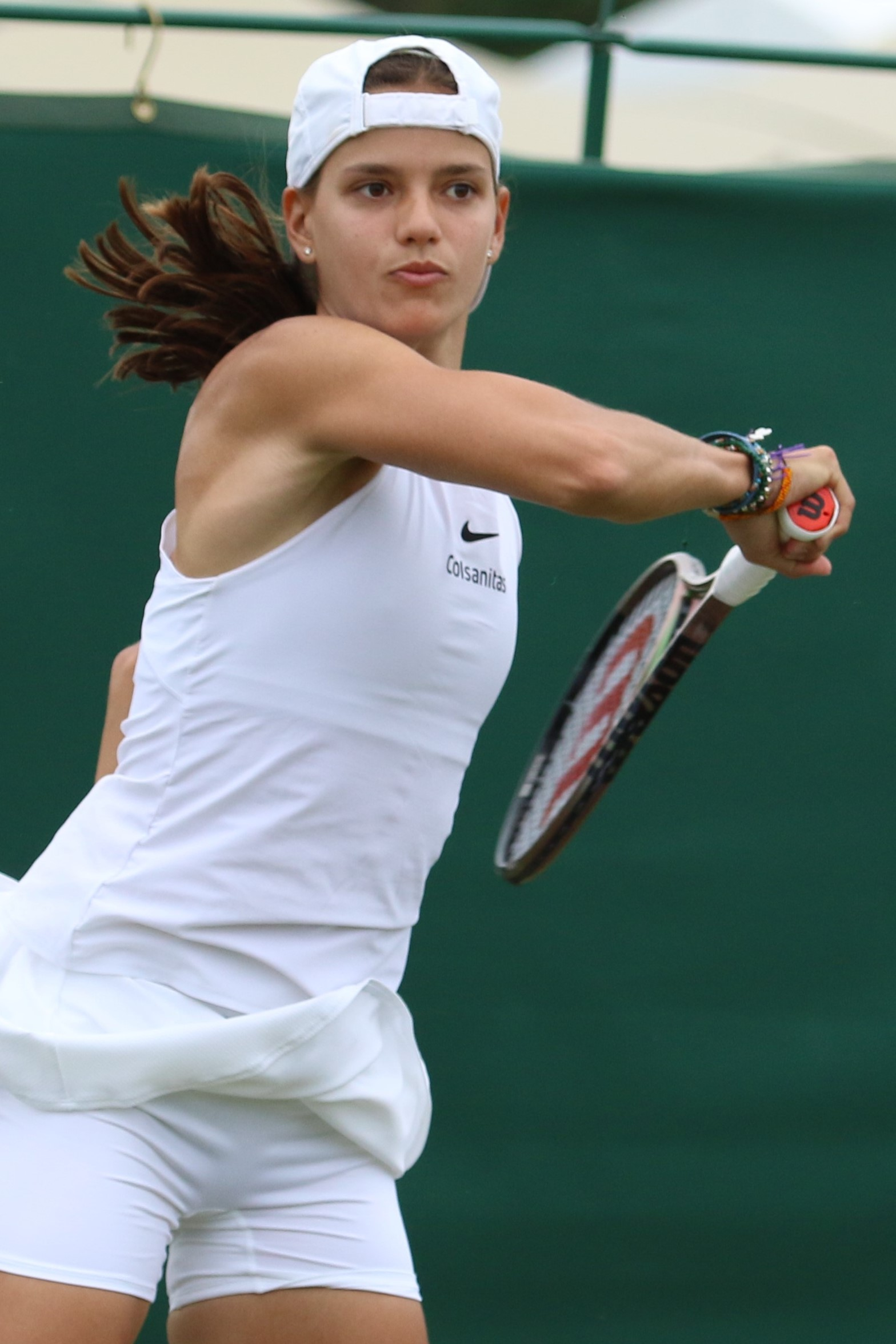
Arango at the 2023 Wimbledon Championships

Arango reached the semifinals at the 2023 Copa Oster, losing to eventual champion Nadia Podoroska in straight sets. Having received an invitation to the San Luis Open Challenger, she reached the quarterfinals. Arango also received a wildcard for the qualifying competition for the Madrid Open. She qualified for the Catalonia Open, and in the main draw, she lost in the second round to Jil Teichmann. Arango entered and lost in the qualifying at Roland Garros and in the qualifying at Wimbledon.

At the Guadalajara Open, on her WTA 1000 level debut she defeated, 11th seed Anastasia Potapova for her first WTA 1000 and top 30 win. Next, she defeated Sloane Stephens in straight sets in one hour to reach the round of 16 of a WTA 1000 tournament for the first time. She defeated Taylor Townsend to reach the quarterfinals of a WTA Tour event for the first time. She became the first Colombian player to make a WTA 1000 quarterfinal since Fabiola Zuluaga at Berlin 2004. As a result, she moved 60 positions up at world No. 120 in the singles rankings on 25 September 2023.

She finished the season at a career-high ranking of world No. 109 on 20 November 2023.

=== 2024: First WTA 125 final ===
Ranked No. 121, Arango qualified into the main draw of the Miami Open making her debut at this WTA 1000 tournament and defeated Tatjana Maria in the first round, before losing to 31st seed Leylah Fernandez.

She was runner-up at the WTA 125 Bolivia Open, losing to Anca Todoni in the final.

=== 2025: WTA 125 title & two WTA 500 finals, Colombian No. 1, top 50 ===
Arango won her first WTA 125 title at the Cancún Open, defeating qualifier Carson Branstine in the final.

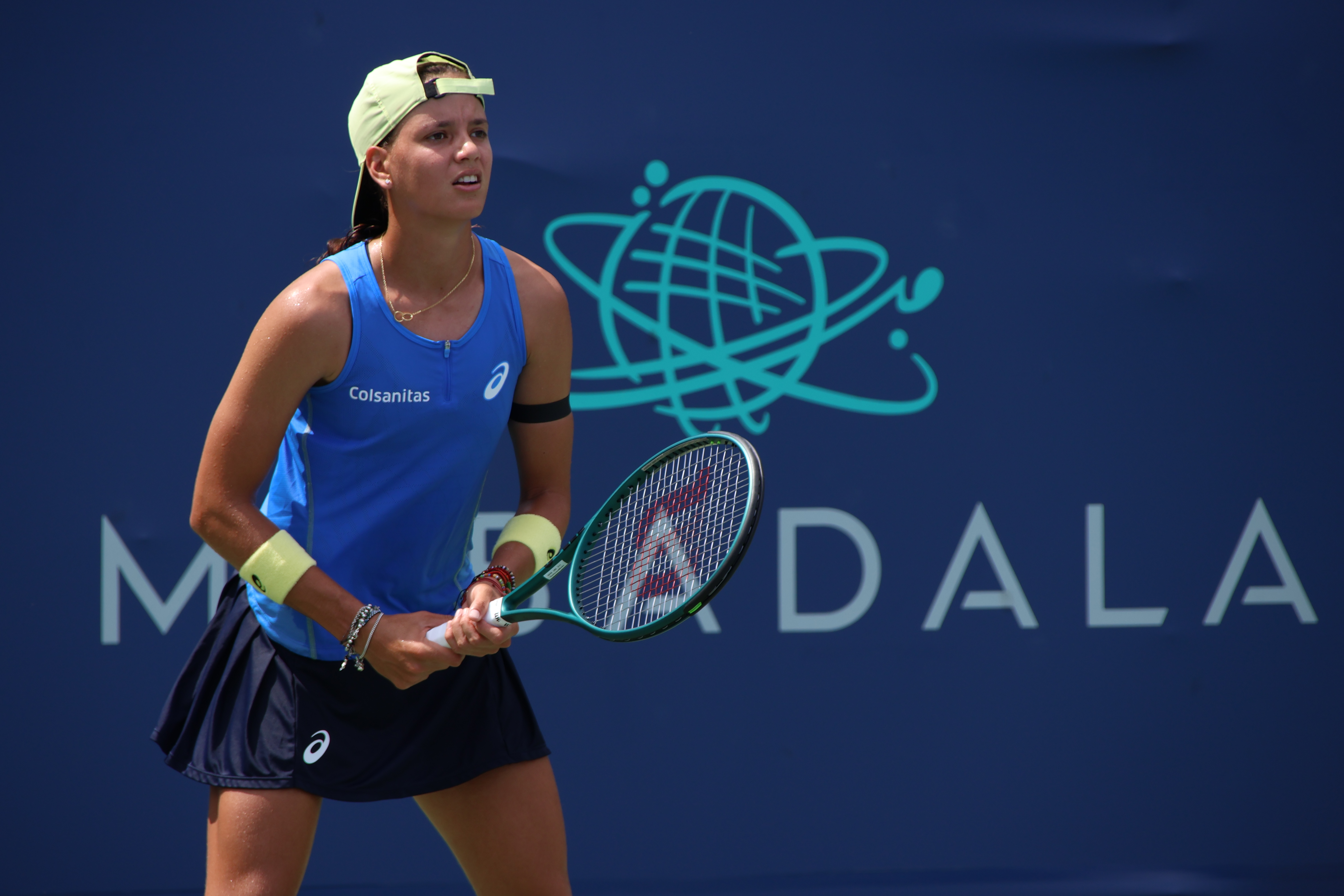
Arango at the 2025 DC Open

Ranked No. 133 at the 2025 Mérida Open, Arango reached her fourth career quarterfinal, the first time since 2023, after qualifying into the main draw and wins over lucky loser María Lourdes Carlé for the second time (first was in qualifying), and then Francesca Jones, who retired injured due to heat illness in the third set. Next she defeated Rebecca Šramková to reach her first WTA semifinal and also first at the WTA 500-level. She reached her first WTA Tour final with a defeat over another qualifier, Daria Saville. As a result, she rose more than 50 positions, making her debut in the top 100 on 3 March 2025, at world No. 80. Arango was the second qualifier in the season to make a WTA 500 final, after Polina Kudermetova pushed world No. 1, Aryna Sabalenka, to three sets in Brisbane. She lost by a double bagel in 55 minutes to top seed Emma Navarro.

Arango reached her second WTA 500 career final at the Guadalajara Open, and second for the season. She lost to Iva Jovic in the final again in straight sets. Arango reached the top 50 on 22 September 2025.

=== 2026: WTA Tour semifinal in Bogota, back to top 100 ===
Ranked No. 106, at the 2026 Copa Colsanitas, Arango advanced to her first WTA Tour semifinal at her home tournament in Bogota, Colombia. As a result, she returned to the top 100 in the WTA singles rankings on 6 April 2026.

== Performance timelines ==
Key
W	F	SF	QF	#R	RR	Q#	DNQ	A	NH

(W) winner; (F) finalist; (SF) semifinalist; (QF) quarterfinalist; (#R) rounds 4, 3, 2, 1; (RR) round-robin stage; (Q#) qualification round; (DNQ) did not qualify; (A) absent; (NH) not held; (SR) strike rate (events won / competed); (W–L) win–loss record.
To avoid confusion and double counting, these charts are updated at the conclusion of a tournament or when the player's participation has ended.

Only main-draw results in WTA Tour, Grand Slam tournaments, Billie Jean King Cup, United Cup, Hopman Cup and Olympic Games are included in win–loss records.

=== Singles ===
Current through the 2026 Miami Open.

Tournament	2016	2017	2018	2019	2020	2021	2022	2023	2024	2025	2026	SR	W–L	Win %
Grand Slam tournaments
Australian Open	A	A	A	A	A	A	A	A	Q1	Q1	1R	0 / 1	0–1	0%
French Open	A	A	A	A	A	A	Q1	Q2	Q1	2R	1R	0 / 2	1–2	33%
Wimbledon	A	A	A	A	NH	A	Q1	Q3	Q1	1R	1R	0 / 2	0–2	0%
US Open	A	A	A	A	A	A	A	Q2	Q1	1R	1R	0 / 2	0–2	0%
Win–loss	0–0	0–0	0–0	0–0	0–0	0–0	0–0	0–0	0–0	1–3	0–4	0 / 7	1–7	13%
National representation
Billie Jean King Cup (Note: Formerly known as Fed Cup until 2020.)	Z1	A	Z1	Z1	Z1 (Note: Edition is split into the two years due to COVID-19.)		A	PO	PO	A		0 / 0	9–8	53%
WTA 1000
Qatar Open	A	NH	A	NH	A	NH	A	NH	A	A	1R	0 / 1	0–1	0%
Dubai	NH	A	NH	A	NH	A	NH	A	A	A	A	0 / 0	0–0	–
Indian Wells Open	A	A	A	A	NH	A	A	A	Q1	A	1R	0 / 1	0–1	0%
Miami Open	A	A	Q1	A	NH	A	A	A	2R	A	1R	0 / 2	1–2	33%
Madrid Open	A	A	A	A	NH	A	A	Q2	2R	1R	2R	0 / 3	2–3	40%
Rome Open	A	A	A	A	A	A	A	A	Q1	2R	Q1	0 / 1	1–1	50%
Canada Open	A	A	A	A	NH	A	A	A	A	1R	Q1	0 / 1	0–1	0%
Cincinnati Open	A	A	A	A	A	A	A	A	A	1R	2R	0 / 2	1–2	33%
Guadalajara Open	NH						A	QF	NTI			0 / 1	3–1	75%
China Open	A	A	A	A	NH				A	2R	A	0 / 1	1–1	50%
Wuhan Open	A	A	A	A	NH				A	1R	A	0 / 1	0–1	0%
Win–loss	0–0	0–0	0–0	0–0	0–0	0–0	0–0	3–1	2–2	2–6	2–5	0 / 14	9–14	39%
Career statistics
WTA Tour; Tournaments	1	1	1	1	0 (Note: During the season, she did not play in the main-draw of any WTA Tour-level tournaments. However, she played at the Billie Jean King Cup, which is not counted as a played tournament but as matches counted.)	1	0	4	5	14	8	Career total: 36		
Titles	0	0	0	0	0	0	0	0	0	0		Career total: 0		
Finals	0	0	0	0	0	0	0	0	0	2		Career total: 2		
Overall win–loss (incl. ITF matches)	14–7	23–9	12–17	0–0	12–6	38–20	12–20	48–27	23-34	29-28		0 / 148	211–148	59%
Year-end ranking	826	494	437	599	493	249	377	112	169	48		$1,330,810		

== WTA Tour finals ==
=== Singles: 2 (2 runner-ups) ===
Legend WTA 1000 WTA 500 (0–2) WTA 250 (0–0)	Finals by surface Hard (0–2) Clay (0–0)	Finals by setting Outdoor (0–2) Indoor (0–0)

Result	W–L	Date	Tournament	Tier	Surface	Opponent	Score
Loss	0–1	Mar 2025	Mérida Open, Mexico	WTA 500	Hard	(United States) Emma Navarro	0–6, 0–6
Loss	0–2	Sep 2025	Guadalajara Open, Mexico	WTA 500	Hard	(United States) Iva Jovic	4–6, 1–6

== WTA 125 finals ==
=== Singles: 2 (1 title, 1 runner-up) ===
Result	W–L	Date	Tournament	Surface	Opponent	Score
Loss	0–1	Oct 2024	Bolivia Open, Bolivia	Clay	(Romania) Anca Todoni	6–7^{(5–7)}, 0–6
Win	1–1	Feb 2025	Cancún Open, Mexico	Hard	(Canada) Carson Branstine	6–2, 6–1

=== Doubles: 1 (1 title, 0 runner-ups) ===
Result	W–L	Date	Tournament	Surface	Partner	Opponents	Score
Win	1–0	Jul 2026	Swedish Open, Sweden	Clay	(Switzerland) Simona Waltert	(United Kingdom) Alicia Barnett (France) Elixane Lechemia	6–4, 6–1

== ITF Circuit finals ==
=== Singles: 6 (3 titles, 3 runner-ups) ===
Legend W25 tournaments (2–2) W10/15 tournaments (1–1)	Finals by surface Hard (1–1) Clay (2–2)

Result	W–L	Date	Tournament	Tier	Surface	Opponent	Score
Loss	0–1	Oct 2016	ITF Pereira, Colombia	W10	Clay	(Colombia) María Herazo González	3–6, 2–6
Win	1–1	Jun 2017	ITF Antalya, Turkey	W15	Clay	(Israel) Vlada Ekshibarova	6–2, 6–3
Loss	1–2	Aug 2017	ITF Fort Worth, United States	W25	Hard	(United States) Katerina Stewart	4–6, 1–6
Win	2–2	Sep 2021	Open Medellín, Colombia	W25	Clay	(Brazil) Laura Pigossi	6–0, 6–0
Win	3–2	Oct 2021	ITF Florence, United States	W25	Hard	(China) Wang Xiyu	6–3, 0–6, 7–6^{(0)}
Loss	3–3	Mar 2023	ITF Mosquera, Colombia	W25	Clay	(Austria) Sinja Kraus	7–6^{(4)}, 6–7^{(6)}, 3–6

=== Doubles: 2 (2 runner-ups) ===
Legend W25 tournaments (0–2)	Finals by surface Clay (0–2)

Result	W–L	Date	Tournament	Tier	Surface	Partner	Opponents	Score
Loss	0–1	Aug 2019	ITF Guayaquil, Ecuador	W25	Clay	(United States) Katerina Stewart	(Chinese Taipei) Hsu Chieh-yu (Mexico) Marcela Zacarías	4–6, 2–6
Loss	0–2	Oct 2019	ITF Cúcuta, Colombia	W25	Clay	(Argentina) Victoria Bosio	(Brazil) Carolina Alves (Mexico) Renata Zarazúa	1–6, ret.

== Head-to-head records ==
=== Record against former top 10 players ===
Arango's record against players who have been ranked in the top 10, active players are in boldface.

Player	Record	Win %	Hard	Clay	Grass	Last match
Former number 1 ranked players						
**(Poland) Iga Świątek**	0–1	0%	0–1	–	–	Lost (1–6, 2–6) at 2025 US Open
Former number 2 ranked players						
**(Russia) Vera Zvonareva**	1–0	100%	–	1–0	–	Won (6–3, 6–1) at 2023 Catalonia Open
Former number 3 ranked players						
**(United States) Sloane Stephens**	1–0	100%	1–0	–	–	Won (6–1, 6–2) at 2023 Guadalajara Open
**(Greece) Maria Sakkari**	0–1	0%	0–1	–	–	Lost (3–6, 4–6) at 2023 Guadalajara Open
Number 4 ranked players						
**(Italy) Jasmine Paolini**	1–0	100%	–	1–0	–	Won (7–6^{(7–0)}, 6–1) at 2018 Copa Colsanitas
**(China) Zheng Qinwen**	0–2	0%	0–1	0–1	–	Lost (3–6, 2–6) at 2025 China Open
**(United States) Amanda Anisimova**	1–0	100%	–	1–0	–	Won (1–6, 6–4, 7–6^{(7–2)}) at 2024 Madrid Open
Number 5 ranked players						
**(Russia) Mirra Andreeva**	0–2	0%	–	0–2	–	Lost (2–6, 4–6) at 2025 Italian Open
Number 8 ranked players						
**(Australia) Daria Kasatkina**	0–1	0%	–	–	0–1	Lost (5–7, 3–6) at 2025 Wimbledon Championships
**(United States) Emma Navarro**	0–1	0%	0–1	–	–	Lost (0–6, 0–6) at 2025 Mérida Open
Number 10 ranked players						
**(Brazil) Beatriz Haddad Maia**	0–1	0%	–	0–1	–	Lost (1–6, 2–6) at 2021 Argentina Open
**Total**	**4–9**	**31%**	**1–4 (20%)**	**3–4 (43%)**	**0–1 (0%)**	**statistics correct as of 6 October 2025.**
