= 2024 Trophée Clarins =

- Date: 13–19 May
- Edition: 3rd
- Category: WTA 125
- Draw: 32S / 8D
- Prize money: $115,000
- Surface: Clay
- Location: Paris, France
- Venue: Lagardère Paris Racing Club

Champions

Singles
- Diana Shnaider

Doubles
- (United States) Asia Muhammad / (Indonesia) Aldila Sutjiadi
← 2023 ·	Clarins Open	· 2025 →

The 2024 Trophée Clarins was a professional women's tennis tournament played on outdoor clay courts. It was the 3rd edition of the tournament and part of the 2024 WTA 125 tournaments, offering a total of $115,000 in prize money. It took place in the middle of Bois de Boulogne in Paris, France between 13 and 19 May 2024.

== Singles main-draw entrants ==
=== Seeds ===
Country	Player	Rank^{1}	Seed
USA	Emma Navarro	22	1
GBR	Katie Boulter	28	2
USA	Sloane Stephens	35	3
FRA	Diane Parry	50	4
CHN	Zhu Lin	57	5
	Diana Shnaider	62	6
ROU	Ana Bogdan	63	7
ESP	Cristina Bucșa	70	8

- ^{1} Rankings are as of 6 May 2024.

=== Other entrants ===
The following players received a wildcard into the singles main draw:

- (France) Loïs Boisson
- (Romania) Simona Halep
- (France) Kristina Mladenovic
- (France) Chloé Paquet

The following players qualified into the singles main draw:

- (United States) Lauren Davis
- (Australia) Olivia Gadecki
- (France) Elsa Jacquemot
- (Romania) Elena-Gabriela Ruse

=== Withdrawals ===
Before the tournament

- (France) Clara Burel → replaced by (France) Alizé Cornet
- (Romania) Jaqueline Cristian → replaced by (Australia) Taylah Preston
- (United States) Kayla Day → replaced by (United States) Katie Volynets
- (France) Océane Dodin → replaced by (Ukraine) Yuliia Starodubtseva
- (Canada) Leylah Fernandez → replaced by (United Kingdom) Heather Watson
- (Germany) Tamara Korpatsch → replaced by (France) Fiona Ferro
- (Germany) Tatjana Maria → replaced by Aliaksandra Sasnovich
- (Netherlands) Arantxa Rus → replaced by (United States) McCartney Kessler
- (Czech Republic) Kateřina Siniaková → replaced by (United Kingdom) Yuriko Miyazaki
- (Denmark) Clara Tauson → replaced by Anastasia Zakharova
- (China) Yuan Yue → replaced by Erika Andreeva

== Doubles entrants ==
=== Seeds ===
Country	Player	Country	Player	Rank	Seed
ESP	Cristina Bucșa		Vera Zvonareva	36	1
NOR	Ulrikke Eikeri	EST	Ingrid Neel	61	2

- Rankings as of 6 May 2024.

== Champions ==
=== Singles ===
- Diana Shnaider def. (United States) Emma Navarro 6–2, 3–6, 6–4

=== Doubles ===
- (United States) Asia Muhammad / (Indonesia) Aldila Sutjiadi def. (Romania) Monica Niculescu / (China) Zhu Lin 7–6^{(7–3)}, 4–6, [11–9]
