= 2025 Trophée Clarins =

- Date: 12–18 May
- Edition: 4th
- Category: WTA 125
- Draw: 32S / 8D
- Surface: Clay
- Location: Paris, France
- Venue: Lagardère Paris Racing Club

Champions

Singles
- (United Kingdom) Katie Boulter

Doubles
- Irina Khromacheva / (Hungary) Fanny Stollár
← 2024 ·	Clarins Open	· 2026 →

The 2025 Trophée Clarins was a professional women's tennis tournament played on outdoor clay courts. It was the 4th edition of the tournament and part of the 2025 WTA 125 tournaments. It took place in the middle of Bois de Boulogne in Paris, France between 12 and 18 May 2025.

== Singles entrants ==
=== Seeds ===
Country	Player	Rank^{1}	Seed
USA	Amanda Anisimova	17	1
GBR	Katie Boulter	40	2
NZL	Lulu Sun	46	3
JPN	Moyuka Uchijima	47	4
GBR	Sonay Kartal	56	5
AUS	Kimberly Birrell	60	6
CZE	Kateřina Siniaková	62	7
FRA	Varvara Gracheva	65	8

- ^{1} Rankings are as of 5 May 2025.

=== Other entrants ===
The following players received a wildcard into the singles main draw:

- (United States) Amanda Anisimova
- (France) Julie Belgraver
- (France) Ksenia Efremova
- (France) Tiantsoa Rakotomanga Rajaonah

The following players qualified into the singles main draw:

- (United States) Louisa Chirico
- (France) Fiona Ferro
- (France) Elsa Jacquemot
- (France) Jenny Lim

=== Withdrawals ===
Before the tournament

- (Romania) Jaqueline Cristian → replaced by (Thailand) Mananchaya Sawangkaew
- (Australia) Maya Joint → replaced by (Croatia) Petra Martić
- (Ukraine) Anhelina Kalinina → replaced by (France) Diane Parry
- (Czech Republic) Barbora Krejčíková → replaced by (Argentina) Solana Sierra
- (Germany) Tatjana Maria → replaced by (Australia) Daria Saville
- (United States) Robin Montgomery → replaced by (Argentina) María Lourdes Carlé
- (United States) Peyton Stearns → replaced by Aliaksandra Sasnovich
- (United States) Katie Volynets → replaced by Anastasia Zakharova

== Doubles entrants ==
=== Seeds ===
Country	Player	Country	Player	Rank	Seed
USA	Desirae Krawczyk	USA	Nicole Melichar-Martinez	35	1
	Irina Khromacheva	HUN	Fanny Stollár	65	2

- Rankings as of 5 May 2025.

=== Other entrants ===
The following pair received a wildcard into the doubles main draw:

- (France) Elsa Jacquemot / (France) Tiantsoa Rakotomanga Rajaonah

== Champions ==
=== Singles ===
- (United Kingdom) Katie Boulter def. (France) Chloé Paquet, 3–6, 6–2, 6–3

=== Doubles ===
- Irina Khromacheva / (Hungary) Fanny Stollár def. (Slovakia) Tereza Mihalíková / (United Kingdom) Olivia Nicholls 4–6, 7–6^{(7–5)}, [10–5]
