= 2023 Trophée Clarins =

- Date: 15–21 May
- Edition: 2nd
- Category: WTA 125
- Draw: 32S / 16D
- Prize money: $115,000
- Surface: Clay
- Location: Paris, France
- Venue: Lagardère Paris Racing Club

Champions

Singles
- (France) Diane Parry

Doubles
- (Kazakhstan) Anna Danilina / Vera Zvonareva
← 2022 ·	Clarins Open	· 2024 →

The 2023 Trophée Clarins was a professional tennis tournament played on outdoor clay courts. It was the 2nd edition of the tournament and part of the 2023 WTA 125 tournaments, offering a total of $115,000 in prize money. It took place in the middle of Bois de Boulogne in Paris, France between 15 and 21 May 2023.

== Singles main-draw entrants ==
=== Seeds ===
Country	Player	Rank^{1}	Seed
	Aliaksandra Sasnovich	44	1
	Varvara Gracheva	46	2
USA	Alycia Parks	49	3
CZE	Linda Nosková	54	4
	~~Anna Kalinskaya~~	~~57~~	~~5~~
USA	Caty McNally	62	6
FRA	Alizé Cornet	64	7
GER	Anna-Lena Friedsam	88	8
	Kamilla Rakhimova	90	9

- ^{1} Rankings are as of 8 May 2023.

=== Other entrants ===
The following players received a wildcard into the singles main draw:

- Mirra Andreeva
- (France) Fiona Ferro
- Varvara Gracheva
- (France) Séléna Janicijevic
- (France) Carole Monnet
- Aliaksandra Sasnovich

The following players received entry as alternates:

- (United States) Ashlyn Krueger
- Oksana Selekhmeteva

The following players qualified into the singles main draw:

- (France) Loïs Boisson
- (United States) Elizabeth Mandlik
- (France) Chloé Paquet
- (Canada) Carol Zhao

The following player received entry as a lucky loser:

- (France) Elsa Jacquemot

=== Withdrawals ===
Before the tournament

- Anna Blinkova → replaced by (South Korea) Jang Su-jeong
- (United Kingdom) Jodie Burrage → replaced by Polina Kudermetova
- (Czech Republic) Linda Fruhvirtová → replaced by (China) Yuan Yue
- (France) Léolia Jeanjean → replaced by (France) Elsa Jacquemot
- Anna Kalinskaya → replaced by (United States) Ashlyn Krueger
- (Germany) Tamara Korpatsch → replaced by Oksana Selekhmeteva
- (Germany) Tatjana Maria → replaced by (Austria) Sinja Kraus
- (Canada) Rebecca Marino → replaced by (Canada) Katherine Sebov
- (Colombia) Camila Osorio → replaced by (France) Kristina Mladenovic

== Doubles entrants ==
=== Seeds ===
Country	Player	Country	Player	Rank	Seed
UKR	Nadiia Kichenok	USA	Alycia Parks	99	1
CZE	Miriam Kolodziejová	SVK	Tereza Mihalíková	99	2

- Rankings as of 8 May 2023.

=== Other entrants ===
The following pair received a wildcard into the doubles main draw:

- (France) Fiona Ferro / (France) Diane Parry

== Champions ==
=== Singles ===
- (France) Diane Parry def. (United States) Caty McNally, Walkover

=== Doubles ===
- (Kazakhstan) Anna Danilina / Vera Zvonareva def. (Ukraine) Nadiia Kichenok / (United States) Alycia Parks 5–7, 7–6^{(7–2)}, [14–12]
