= 2023 Trophée Clarins – Singles =

Tennis tournament

Singles
- 2023 Trophée Clarins

Final
- Champion: (France) Diane Parry
- Runner-up: (United States) Caty McNally
- Score: Walkover

Details
- Draw: 32 (6 WC)
- Seeds: 8

Events
Singles	Doubles
← 2022 ·	Clarins Open	· 2024 →

Claire Liu was the reigning champion, but she chose to compete in Florence instead.

Diane Parry won the title as Caty McNally withdrew before the final.

== Seeds ==
1. Aliaksandra Sasnovich (second round)
2. Varvara Gracheva (semifinals)
3. (United States) Alycia Parks (first round)
4. (Czech Republic) Linda Nosková (quarterfinals)
5. Anna Kalinskaya (withdrew)
6. (United States) Caty McNally (final, withdrew)
7. (France) Alizé Cornet (quarterfinals)
8. (Germany) Anna-Lena Friedsam (first round)
9. Kamilla Rakhimova (quarterfinals)

== Draw ==
=== Key ===
- Q = Qualifier
- WC = Wild card
- LL = Lucky loser
- Alt = Alternate
- SE = Special exempt
- PR = Protected ranking
- ITF = ITF entry
- JE = Junior exempt
- w/o = Walkover
- r = Retired
- d = Defaulted
- SR = Special ranking

=== Finals ===
Semifinals
(United States) Katie Volynets	1	6	2
6	(United States) Caty McNally	6	4	6
(France) Diane Parry	6	6
2/WC	Varvara Gracheva	0	2

Final
6	(United States) Caty McNally
(France) Diane Parry	w/o

=== Top half ===
First round
1/WC	A Sasnovich	6	7
(France) C Burel	1	5
Q	(Canada) C Zhao	0	6^{9}
(United States) K Volynets	6	7^{11}
WC	(France) F Ferro	3	1
(South Korea) S-j Jang	6	6
Alt	(United States) A Krueger	6^{6}	3
7	(France) A Cornet	7^{8}	6
3	(United States) A Parks	2	4
(Japan) N Hibino	6	6
Q	(France) C Paquet	6	4	3
(France) O Dodin	2	6	6
Q	(France) L Boisson	4	4
(Slovenia) T Zidanšek	6	6
(France) K Mladenovic	4	4
6	(United States) C McNally	6	6

Second round
1/WC	A Sasnovich	3	3
(United States) K Volynets	6	6
(South Korea) S-j Jang	1	5
7	(France) A Cornet	6	7
(Japan) N Hibino	6	6
(France) O Dodin	1	4
(Slovenia) T Zidanšek	6^{3}	6^{1}
6	(United States) C McNally	7^{7}	7^{7}

Quarterfinals
(United States) K Volynets	7	2	6
7	(France) A Cornet	5	6	2
(Japan) N Hibino	2	3^{r}
6	(United States) C McNally	6	5

Semifinals
(United States) K Volynets	1	6	2
6	(United States) C McNally	6	4	6

=== Bottom half ===
First round
8	(Germany) A-L Friedsam	1	4
(China) Y Yuan	6	6
(France) D Parry	1	6	6
WC	(France) S Janicijevic	6	2	4
(Canada) K Sebov	6	3
(Hungary) A Bondár	3	0^{r}
LL	(France) E Jacquemot	1	6	4
4	(Czech Republic) L Nosková	6	2	6
9	K Rakhimova	6	6
P Kudermetova	3	2
WC	M Andreeva	7	6
Q	(United States) E Mandlik	5	2
(Austria) S Kraus	6	5	2
Alt	O Selekhmeteva	4	7	6
WC	(France) C Monnet	1	6	3
2/WC	V Gracheva	6	3	6

Second round
(China) Y Yuan	2	3
(France) D Parry	6	6
(Canada) K Sebov	5	2
4	(Czech Republic) L Nosková	7	6
9	K Rakhimova	6	6
WC	M Andreeva	2	4
Alt	O Selekhmeteva	0	3
2/WC	V Gracheva	6	6

Quarterfinals
(France) D Parry	7	6
4	(Czech Republic) L Nosková	5	2
9	K Rakhimova	2	5
2/WC	V Gracheva	6	7

Semifinals
(France) D Parry	6	6
2/WC	V Gracheva	0	2

== Qualifying ==
=== Seeds ===
1. (United States) Elizabeth Mandlik (qualified)
2. (France) Elsa Jacquemot (qualifying competition, lucky loser)
3. Oksana Selekhmeteva (moved to main draw)
4. (Canada) Carol Zhao (qualified)

=== Qualifiers ===
1. (United States) Elizabeth Mandlik
2. (France) Chloé Paquet
3. (France) Loïs Boisson
4. (Canada) Carol Zhao

=== Lucky loser ===
1. (France) Elsa Jacquemot

=== Qualifying draw ===
==== First qualifier ====
Qualifying competition
1	(United States) Elizabeth Mandlik	6	4	6
WC	(France) Amandine Hesse	1	6	1

==== Second qualifier ====
Qualifying competition
2	(France) Elsa Jacquemot	6^{4}	3
	(France) Chloé Paquet	7^{7}	6

==== Third qualifier ====
Qualifying competition
Alt	(Germany) Yana Morderger	3	2
WC	(France) Loïs Boisson	6	6

==== Fourth qualifier ====
Qualifying competition
4	(Canada) Carol Zhao	6	6
	(France) Marine Partaud	2	2
