= 2023 Trophée Clarins – Doubles =

Doubles
- 2023 Trophée Clarins

Final
- Champions: (Kazakhstan) Anna Danilina; Vera Zvonareva
- Runners-up: (Ukraine) Nadiia Kichenok (United States) Alycia Parks
- Score: 5–7, 7–6^{(7–2)}, [14–12]

Events
Singles	Doubles
← 2022 ·	Clarins Open	· 2024 →

Beatriz Haddad Maia and Kristina Mladenovic were the reigning champions, but chose not to compete this year.

Anna Danilina and Vera Zvonareva won the title, defeating Nadiia Kichenok and Alycia Parks in the final, 5–7, 7–6^{(7–2)}, [14–12].

== Seeds ==
1. (Ukraine) Nadiia Kichenok / (United States) Alycia Parks (final)
2. (Czech Republic) Miriam Kolodziejová / (Slovakia) Tereza Mihalíková (quarterfinals)

== Draw ==
=== Key ===
- Q = Qualifier
- WC = Wild card
- LL = Lucky loser
- Alt = Alternate
- SE = Special exempt
- PR = Protected ranking
- ITF = ITF entry
- JE = Junior exempt
- w/o = Walkover
- r = Retired
- d = Defaulted
- SR = Special ranking

=== Draw ===
Quarterfinals
1	(Ukraine) N Kichenok (United States) A Parks	6	6
(Norway) U Eikeri (United States) S Santamaria	4	3
WC	(France) F Ferro (France) D Parry	6^{5}	7^{7}	[5]
(United Kingdom) O Nicholls (Poland) A Rosolska	7^{7}	6^{5}	[10]
(Kazakhstan) A Danilina; V Zvonareva	7	5	[10]
(Georgia (country)) N Dzalamidze; L Marozava	5	7	[2]
(South Korea) S-j Jang (China) Z Yang	6	6
2	(Czech Republic) M Kolodziejová (Slovakia) T Mihalíková	4	2

Semifinals
1	(Ukraine) N Kichenok (United States) A Parks	3	7^{7}	[12]
(United Kingdom) O Nicholls (Poland) A Rosolska	6	6^{4}	[10]
(Kazakhstan) A Danilina; V Zvonareva	6	4	[10]
(South Korea) S-j Jang (China) Z Yang	3	6	[7]

Final
1	(Ukraine) Nadiia Kichenok (United States) Alycia Parks	7	6^{2}	[12]
(Kazakhstan) Anna Danilina; Vera Zvonareva	5	7^{7}	[14]
