= 2025 Trophée Clarins – Singles =

Tennis tournament

Singles
- 2025 Trophée Clarins

Final
- Champion: (United Kingdom) Katie Boulter
- Runner-up: (France) Chloé Paquet
- Score: 3–6, 6–2, 6–3

Details
- Draw: 32 (4 WC)
- Seeds: 8

Events
Singles	Doubles
- Clarins Open

Katie Boulter won the singles title at the 2025 Trophée Clarins, defeating Chloé Paquet in the final, 3–6, 6–2, 6–3.

Diana Shnaider was the reigning champion, but did not participate this year.

== Seeds ==
1. (United States) Amanda Anisimova (quarterfinals, retired)
2. (United Kingdom) Katie Boulter (champion)
3. (New Zealand) Lulu Sun (first round)
4. (Japan) Moyuka Uchijima (second round)
5. (United Kingdom) Sonay Kartal (second round, retired)
6. (Australia) Kimberly Birrell (first round)
7. (Czech Republic) Kateřina Siniaková (second round, withdrew)
8. (France) Varvara Gracheva (semifinals)

== Draw ==
Key

- Q = Qualifier
- WC = Wild card
- LL = Lucky loser
- Alt = Alternate
- ITF = ITF entry
- PR = Protected ranking
- SR = Special ranking
- SE = Special exempt
- JE = Junior exempt
- JR = Junior Accelerator Programme entrant
- CO = College Accelerator Programme entrant
- NG = Next Gen Accelerator Program entrant
- w/o = Walkover
- r = Retired
- d = Defaulted

=== Finals ===
Semifinals
(France) Chloé Paquet	6	6
Aliaksandra Sasnovich	4	3
8	(France) Varvara Gracheva	0	6	3
2	(United Kingdom) Katie Boulter	6	3	6

Final
(France) Chloé Paquet	6	2	3
2	(United Kingdom) Katie Boulter	3	6	6

=== Top half ===
First round
1/WC	(United States) A Anisimova	6	6
(Ukraine) Y Starodubtseva	1	2
(Croatia) P Martić	6	2	6
WC	(France) T Rakotomanga Rajaonah	2	6	4
Q	(France) F Ferro	2	2
A Zakharova	6	6
(France) C Paquet	7	3	6
6	(Australia) K Birrell	5	6	3
3	(New Zealand) L Sun	4	6	6^{4}
WC	(France) J Belgraver	6	1	7^{7}
(Argentina) S Sierra	6	6
(Switzerland) V Golubic	2	0
A Sasnovich	6	6
(Argentina) ML Carlé	4	2
Q	(France) J Lim	2	6^{5}
7	(Czech Republic) K Siniaková	6	7^{7}

Second round
1/WC	(United States) A Anisimova	6	6
(Croatia) P Martić	0	3
A Zakharova	3	3
(France) C Paquet	6	6
WC	(France) J Belgraver	7^{7}	6^{3}	7^{7}
(Argentina) S Sierra	6^{4}	7^{7}	6^{5}
A Sasnovich	w/o
7	(Czech Republic) K Siniaková

Quarterfinals
1/WC	(United States) A Anisimova	6	3	0^{r}
(France) C Paquet	3	6	0
WC	(France) J Belgraver	4	2
A Sasnovich	6	6

Semifinals
(France) C Paquet	6	6
A Sasnovich	4	3

=== Bottom half ===
First round
8	(France) V Gracheva	6	6
Q	(United States) L Chirico	1	2
(France) D Parry	6	2	3
(United States) H Baptiste	3	6	6
K Rakhimova	6	6
WC	(France) K Efremova	3	3
(Thailand) M Sawangkaew	6	4	3
4	(Japan) M Uchijima	1	6	6
5	(United Kingdom) S Kartal	6	3	6
(Japan) A Ito	2	6	3
Q	(France) E Jacquemot	3	6	6
(China) Y Yuan	6	3	3
(Australia) D Saville	6	1	7
(Spain) L Romero Gormaz	4	6	5
E Andreeva	4	4
2	(United Kingdom) K Boulter	6	6

Second round
8	(France) V Gracheva	2	6	6
(United States) H Baptiste	6	4	3
K Rakhimova	6	6
4	(Japan) M Uchijima	2	1
5	(United Kingdom) S Kartal	4	0^{r}
Q	(France) E Jacquemot	6	0
(Australia) D Saville	3	0
2	(United Kingdom) K Boulter	6	6

Quarterfinals
8	(France) V Gracheva	7	2	6
K Rakhimova	5	6	4
Q	(France) E Jacquemot	4	6	2
2	(United Kingdom) K Boulter	6	1	6

Semifinals
8	(France) V Gracheva	0	6	3
2	(United Kingdom) K Boulter	6	3	6

== Qualifying ==
=== Seeds ===
1. (China) Wei Sijia (qualifying competition)
2. (France) Elsa Jacquemot (qualified)
3. (Czech Republic) Linda Fruhvirtová (qualifying competition)
4. (Australia) Maddison Inglis (qualifying competition)

=== Qualifiers ===
1. (France) Fiona Ferro
2. (France) Elsa Jacquemot
3. (United States) Louisa Chirico
4. (France) Jenny Lim

=== Qualifying draw ===
==== First qualifier ====
Qualifying competition
1	(China) Wei Sijia	6	1	3
WC	(France) Fiona Ferro	4	6	6

==== Second qualifier ====
Qualifying competition
2	(France) Elsa Jacquemot	6	7^{8}
	(Czech Republic) Sára Bejlek	2	6^{6}

==== Third qualifier ====
Qualifying competition
3	(Czech Republic) Linda Fruhvirtová	1	4
	(United States) Louisa Chirico	6	6

==== Fourth qualifier ====
Qualifying competition
4	(Australia) Maddison Inglis	6	2	1
WC	(France) Jenny Lim	3	6	6
