= 2025 Trophée Clarins – Doubles =

Doubles
- 2025 Trophée Clarins

Final
- Champions: Irina Khromacheva (Hungary) Fanny Stollár
- Runners-up: (Slovakia) Tereza Mihalíková (United Kingdom) Olivia Nicholls
- Score: 4–6, 7–6^{(7–5)}, [10–5]

Events
Singles	Doubles
← 2024 ·	Clarins Open	· 2026 →

Irina Khromacheva and Fanny Stollár won the title, defeating Tereza Mihalíková and Olivia Nicholls in the final, 4–6, 7–6^{(7–5)}, [10–5].

Asia Muhammad and Aldila Sutjiadi were the reigning champions, but Muhammad did not participate this year. Sutjiadi partnered Miyu Kato, but they lost in the quarterfinals to Mihalíková and Nicholls.

== Seeds ==
1. (United States) Desirae Krawczyk / (United States) Nicole Melichar-Martinez (semifinals, withdrew)
2. Irina Khromacheva / (Hungary) Fanny Stollár (champions)

== Draw ==
=== Key ===
- Q = Qualifier
- WC = Wild card
- LL = Lucky loser
- Alt = Alternate
- ITF = ITF entry
- PR = Protected ranking
- SR = Special ranking
- SE = Special exempt
- JE = Junior exempt
- JR = Junior Accelerator Programme entrant
- CO = College Accelerator Programme entrant
- NG = Next Gen Accelerator Program entrant
- w/o = Walkover
- r = Retired
- d = Defaulted

=== Finals ===
Quarterfinals
1	(United States) D Krawczyk (United States) N Melichar-Martinez	6	6
(France) V Gracheva (New Zealand) L Sun	3	1
(Slovakia) T Mihalíková (United Kingdom) O Nicholls	6	6
(Japan) M Kato (Indonesia) A Sutjiadi	1	4
(Japan) S Aoyama (Japan) M Uchijima	6	1	[12]
WC	(France) E Jacquemot (France) T Rakotomanga Rajaonah	3	6	[10]
(Georgia (country)) O Kalashnikova; K Rakhimova	3	2
2	I Khromacheva (Hungary) F Stollár	6	6

Semifinals
1	(United States) D Krawczyk (United States) N Melichar-Martinez
(Slovakia) T Mihalíková (United Kingdom) O Nicholls	w/o
(Japan) S Aoyama (Japan) M Uchijima	2	3
2	I Khromacheva (Hungary) F Stollár	6	6

Final
(Slovakia) T Mihalíková (United Kingdom) O Nicholls	6	6^{5}	[5]
2	I Khromacheva (Hungary) F Stollár	4	7^{7}	[10]
