= 2024 Trophée Clarins – Singles =

Tennis tournament

Singles
- 2024 Trophée Clarins

Final
- Champion: Diana Shnaider
- Runner-up: (United States) Emma Navarro
- Score: 6–2, 3–6, 6–4

Details
- Draw: 32 (6 WC)
- Seeds: 8

Events
Singles	Doubles
- Clarins Open

Diana Shnaider won the singles title at the 2024 Trophée Clarins, defeating Emma Navarro in the final, 6–2, 3–6, 6–4.

Diane Parry was the defending champion, but lost in the second round to Erika Andreeva.

== Seeds ==
1. (United States) Emma Navarro (final)
2. (United Kingdom) Katie Boulter (quarterfinals)
3. (United States) Sloane Stephens (first round, retired)
4. (France) Diane Parry (second round)
5. (China) Zhu Lin (first round)
6. Diana Shnaider (champion)
7. (Romania) Ana Bogdan (first round, retired)
8. (Spain) Cristina Bucșa (second round)

== Draw ==
Key

- Q = Qualifier
- WC = Wild card
- LL = Lucky loser
- Alt = Alternate
- ITF = ITF entry
- PR = Protected ranking
- SR = Special ranking
- SE = Special exempt
- JE = Junior exempt
- JR = Junior Accelerator Programme entrant
- CO = College Accelerator Programme entrant
- NG = Next Gen Accelerator Program entrant
- w/o = Walkover
- r = Retired
- d = Defaulted

=== Finals ===
Semifinals
1	(United States) Emma Navarro	6	6
Q	(Romania) Elena-Gabriela Ruse	0	2
6	Diana Shnaider	6	6
(France) Varvara Gracheva	4	2

Final
1	(United States) Emma Navarro	2	6	4
6	Diana Shnaider	6	3	6

=== Top half ===
First round
1	(United States) E Navarro	6	6
Q	(United States) L Davis	0	0
WC	(Romania) S Halep	7	2^{r}
(United States) M Kessler	5	3
(France) F Ferro	3	6	0
WC	(France) L Boisson	6	4	1^{r}
(Australia) T Preston	2	5
8	(Spain) C Bucșa	6	7
3	(United States) S Stephens	1	2^{r}
Q	(Australia) O Gadecki	6	3
(France) A Cornet	6	6
(Ukraine) Y Starodubtseva	3	3
(Japan) N Hibino	7^{7}	4	1
WC	(France) K Mladenovic	6^{4}	6	6
Q	(Romania) E-G Ruse	0	6	6
5	(China) L Zhu	6	1	1

Second round
1	(United States) E Navarro	6	6
(United States) M Kessler	1	2
(France) F Ferro	6	7^{8}
8	(Spain) C Bucșa	3	6^{6}
Q	(Australia) O Gadecki	4	6	3
(France) A Cornet	6	4	6
WC	(France) K Mladenovic	1	0
Q	(Romania) E-G Ruse	6	6

Quarterfinals
1	(United States) E Navarro	6	6
(France) F Ferro	3	2
(France) A Cornet	1	2
Q	(Romania) E-G Ruse	6	6

Semifinals
1	(United States) E Navarro	6	6
Q	(Romania) E-G Ruse	0	2

=== Bottom half ===
First round
6	D Shnaider	6	6
(Belgium) G Minnen	4	3
(United Kingdom) H Watson	7^{9}	3	3
Q	(France) E Jacquemot	6^{7}	6	6
(United Kingdom) L Miyazaki	5	3
E Andreeva	7	6
A Zakharova	6	1	1
4	(France) D Parry	3	6	6
7	(Romania) A Bogdan	0^{r}
(France) V Gracheva	4
A Sasnovich	5	3
(United States) K Volynets	7	6
WC	(France) C Paquet	6	3	1
(Bulgaria) V Tomova	3	6	6
(United Kingdom) H Dart	0	4
2	(United Kingdom) K Boulter	6	6

Second round
6	D Shnaider	7	4	7^{7}
Q	(France) E Jacquemot	5	6	6^{5}
E Andreeva	7	7
4	(France) D Parry	5	5
(France) V Gracheva	2	6	6
(United States) K Volynets	6	2	4
(Bulgaria) V Tomova	2	4
2	(United Kingdom) K Boulter	6	6

Quarterfinals
6	D Shnaider	6	6
E Andreeva	1	2
(France) V Gracheva	6	7^{8}
2	(United Kingdom) K Boulter	3	6^{6}

Semifinals
6	D Shnaider	6	6
(France) V Gracheva	4	2

== Qualifying ==
=== Seeds ===
1. (Romania) Elena Gabriela Ruse (qualified)
2. (France) Elsa Jacquemot (qualified)
3. (Australia) Olivia Gadecki (qualified)
4. (United States) Lauren Davis (qualified)

=== Qualifiers ===
1. (Romania) Elena-Gabriela Ruse
2. (France) Elsa Jacquemot
3. (Australia) Olivia Gadecki
4. (United States) Lauren Davis

=== Qualifying draw ===
==== First qualifier ====
Qualifying competition
1	(Romania) Elena-Gabriela Ruse	7^{9}	4	6
	Vera Zvonareva	6^{7}	6	2

==== Second qualifier ====
Qualifying competition
2	(France) Elsa Jacquemot	7	6
	(Romania) Miriam Bulgaru	5	3

==== Third qualifier ====
Qualifying competition
3	(Australia) Olivia Gadecki	6	6
WC	(France) Astrid Lew Yan Foon	3	3

==== Fourth qualifier ====
Qualifying competition
4	(United States) Lauren Davis	6	6
WC	(France) Jenny Lim	0	1
