= WTA Paris =

WTA Paris may refer to:

- Clarins Open (1987–1992)
- Open GDF Suez (1993–2014)
