= 2022 Trophee Lagardère =

- Date: 9–15 May
- Edition: 1st
- Category: WTA 125
- Draw: 32S / 16D
- Prize money: $115,000
- Surface: Clay
- Location: Paris, France
- Venue: Lagardère Paris Racing Club

Champions

Singles
- (United States) Claire Liu

Doubles
- (Brazil) Beatriz Haddad Maia / (France) Kristina Mladenovic
Clarins Open	· 2023 →

The 2022 Trophée Lagardère was a professional tennis tournament played on outdoor clay courts. It was the 1st edition of the tournament and part of the 2022 WTA 125 tournaments, offering a total of $115,000 in prize money. It took place in the middle of Bois de Boulogne in Paris, France between 9 and 15 May 2022.

== Singles main-draw entrants ==
=== Seeds ===
Country	Player	Rank^{1}	Seed
EST	Kaia Kanepi	55	1
POL	Magda Linette	56	2
BRA	Beatriz Haddad Maia	65	3
	Varvara Gracheva	73	4
	Anna Kalinskaya	75	5
	Anastasia Potapova	78	6
USA	Claire Liu	86	7
POL	Magdalena Fręch	88	8

- ^{1} Rankings are as of 25 April 2022.

=== Other entrants ===
The following players received a wildcard into the singles main draw:

- (France) Fiona Ferro
- (Czech Republic) Linda Fruhvirtová
- (France) Elsa Jacquemot
- (France) Séléna Janicijevic

The following players qualified into the singles main draw:

- (France) Delia Gaillard
- (Netherlands) Arianne Hartono
- (France) Marine Partaud
- Anastasia Zakharova

The following player received entry as lucky loser:

- (Switzerland) Joanne Züger

=== Withdrawals ===
Before the tournament

- (France) Océane Dodin → replaced by (United States) Hailey Baptiste
- (France) Caroline Garcia → replaced by Anastasia Potapova
- (United States) Ann Li → replaced by (Australia) Maddison Inglis
- (Slovakia) Anna Karolína Schmiedlová → replaced by (United States) Christina McHale
- (China) Wang Qiang → replaced by (South Korea) Jang Su-jeong
- (United Kingdom) Heather Watson → replaced by (Switzerland) Joanne Züger
- Vera Zvonareva → replaced by (Croatia) Donna Vekić

== Doubles entrants ==
=== Seeds ===
Country	Player	Country	Player	Rank^{1}	Seed
BRA	Beatriz Haddad Maia	FRA	Kristina Mladenovic	152	1
GEO	Oksana Kalashnikova	JPN	Miyu Kato	157	2
	Anna Kalinskaya		Anastasia Potapova	184	3
GBR	Samantha Murray Sharan	USA	Ingrid Neel	217	4

- ^{1} Rankings as of 25 April 2022.

=== Other entrants ===
The following pair received a wildcard into the doubles main draw:

- (France) Delia Gaillard / (South Korea) Jang Su-jeong

== Champions ==
=== Singles ===
- (United States) Claire Liu def. (Brazil) Beatriz Haddad Maia 6–3, 6–4

=== Doubles ===
- (Brazil) Beatriz Haddad Maia / (France) Kristina Mladenovic def. (Georgia (country)) Oksana Kalashnikova / (Japan) Miyu Kato 5–7, 6–4, [10–4]
