= 2024 Trophée Clarins – Doubles =

Doubles
- 2024 Trophée Clarins

Final
- Champions: (United States) Asia Muhammad (Indonesia) Aldila Sutjiadi
- Runners-up: (Romania) Monica Niculescu (China) Zhu Lin
- Score: 7–6^{(7–3)}, 4–6, [11–9]

Events
Singles	Doubles
← 2023 ·	Clarins Open	· 2025 →

Anna Danilina and Vera Zvonareva were the reigning champions, but Danilina chose to compete in Parma instead. Zvonareva partnered Cristina Bucșa but lost in the quarterfinals to Xu Yifan and Zhang Shuai.

Asia Muhammad and Aldila Sutjiadi won the title, defeating Monica Niculescu and Zhu Lin in the final, 7–6^{(7–3)}, 4–6, [11–9].

== Seeds ==
1. (Spain) Cristina Bucșa / Vera Zvonareva (quarterfinals)
2. (Norway) Ulrikke Eikeri / (Estonia) Ingrid Neel (quarterfinals)

== Draw ==
=== Key ===
- Q = Qualifier
- WC = Wild card
- LL = Lucky loser
- Alt = Alternate
- SE = Special exempt
- PR = Protected ranking
- ITF = ITF entry
- JE = Junior exempt
- w/o = Walkover
- r = Retired
- d = Defaulted
- SR = Special ranking

=== Finals ===
Quarterfinals
1	(Spain) C Bucșa; V Zvonareva	2	6	[3]
(China) Y Xu (China) S Zhang	6	2	[10]
(Japan) M Kato (Chinese Taipei) F-h Wu	4	6	[6]
(United States) A Muhammad (Indonesia) A Sutjiadi	6	2	[10]
(Japan) E Hozumi (Japan) M Ninomiya	2	4
(Romania) M Niculescu (China) L Zhu	6	6
(Belgium) G Minnen (United Kingdom) H Watson	6	7^{7}
2	(Norway) U Eikeri (Estonia) I Neel	3	6^{3}

Semifinals
(China) Y Xu (China) S Zhang	5	6	[8]
(United States) A Muhammad (Indonesia) A Sutjiadi	7	4	[10]
(Romania) M Niculescu (China) L Zhu	6	5	[15]
(Belgium) G Minnen (United Kingdom) H Watson	0	7	[13]

Final
(United States) A Muhammad (Indonesia) A Sutjiadi	7^{7}	4	[11]
(Romania) M Niculescu (China) L Zhu	6^{3}	6	[9]
