= 2022 Trophee Lagardère – Singles =

Tennis tournament

Singles
- 2022 Trophee Lagardère

Final
- Champion: (United States) Claire Liu
- Runner-up: (Brazil) Beatriz Haddad Maia
- Score: 6–3, 6–4

Details
- Draw: 32 (3 WC)
- Seeds: 8

Events
Singles	Doubles
- Clarins Open

Claire Liu won the title, defeating Beatriz Haddad Maia in the final, 6–3, 6–4.

This was the first edition of the tournament.

== Seeds ==
1. (Estonia) Kaia Kanepi (semifinals)
2. (Poland) Magda Linette (second round)
3. (Brazil) Beatriz Haddad Maia (final)
4. Varvara Gracheva (quarterfinals)
5. Anna Kalinskaya (second round)
6. Anastasia Potapova (first round)
7. (United States) Claire Liu (champion)
8. (Poland) Magdalena Fręch (quarterfinals)

== Draw ==
Key

- Q = Qualifier
- WC = Wild card
- LL = Lucky loser
- Alt = Alternate
- ITF = ITF entry
- PR = Protected ranking
- SR = Special ranking
- SE = Special exempt
- JE = Junior exempt
- JR = Junior Accelerator Programme entrant
- CO = College Accelerator Programme entrant
- NG = Next Gen Accelerator Program entrant
- w/o = Walkover
- r = Retired
- d = Defaulted

=== Finals ===
Semifinals
1	(Estonia) Kaia Kanepi	4	6	0
7	(United States) Claire Liu	6	2	6
3	(Brazil) Beatriz Haddad Maia	5	6	6
(Romania) Ana Bogdan	7	3	1

Final
7	(United States) Claire Liu	6	6
3	(Brazil) Beatriz Haddad Maia	3	4

=== Top half ===
First round
1	(Estonia) K Kanepi	6	6
K Rakhimova	4	2
(United States) C McHale	1	2
WC	(Czech Republic) L Fruhvirtová	6	6
(Italy) L Stefanini	1	2^{r}
LL	(Switzerland) J Züger	6	2
(Croatia) D Vekić	6	6
6	A Potapova	2	4
4	V Gracheva	6	6
Q	(France) D Gaillard	0	0
(South Korea) S-j Jang	6	6
(France) C Paquet	4	1
A Gasanova	6	6
(France) T Andrianjafitrimo	3	4
(Ukraine) D Yastremska	1	3
7	(United States) C Liu	6	6

Second round
1	(Estonia) K Kanepi	7^{7}	6
WC	(Czech Republic) L Fruhvirtová	6^{4}	4
LL	(Switzerland) J Züger	1	4
(Croatia) D Vekić	6	6
4	V Gracheva	6	5	7
(South Korea) S-j Jang	4	7	5
A Gasanova	4	4
7	(United States) C Liu	6	6

Quarterfinals
1	(Estonia) K Kanepi	3	6	6
(Croatia) D Vekić	6	4	1
4	V Gracheva	4	5
7	(United States) C Liu	6	7

Semifinals
1	(Estonia) K Kanepi	4	6	0
7	(United States) C Liu	6	2	6

=== Bottom half ===
First round
5	A Kalinskaya	6	6
Q	(France) M Partaud	2	1
WC	(France) E Jacquemot	6	6
Q	(Netherlands) A Hartono	1	1
Q	A Zakharova	6^{5}	4
(United States) H Baptiste	7^{7}	6
PR	(Australia) D Saville	5	7^{7}	6^{4}
3	(Brazil) B Haddad Maia	7	6^{3}	7^{7}
8	(Poland) M Fręch	6	6
(France) K Mladenovic	1	4
(Australia) M Inglis	1	4
(France) D Parry	6	6
WC	(France) F Ferro	3	5
(Romania) A Bogdan	6	7
WC	(France) S Janicijevic	4	6	5
2	(Poland) M Linette	6	3	7

Second round
5	A Kalinskaya	5	0
WC	(France) E Jacquemot	7	6
(United States) H Baptiste	6	3	2
3	(Brazil) B Haddad Maia	3	6	6
8	(Poland) M Fręch	6	3	7^{8}
(France) D Parry	1	6	6^{6}
(Romania) A Bogdan	7^{7}	6
2	(Poland) M Linette	6^{4}	0

Quarterfinals
WC	(France) E Jacquemot	6	1	4
3	(Brazil) B Haddad Maia	4	6	6
8	(Poland) M Fręch	2	4
(Romania) A Bogdan	6	6

Semifinals
3	(Brazil) B Haddad Maia	5	6	6
(Romania) A Bogdan	7	3	1

== Qualifying ==
=== Seeds ===
1. (Netherlands) Arianne Hartono (qualified)
2. (United States) Christina McHale (moved to main draw)
3. (Australia) Lizette Cabrera (qualifying competition)
4. (Ukraine) Katarina Zavatska (qualifying competition, retired)

=== Qualifiers ===
1. (Netherlands) Arianne Hartono
2. Anastasia Zakharova
3. (France) Marine Partaud
4. (France) Delia Gaillard

=== Lucky loser ===
1. (Switzerland) Joanne Züger

=== Draw ===
==== First qualifier ====
Qualifying competition
1	(Netherlands) Arianne Hartono	7^{7}	6
	(Switzerland) Joanne Züger	6^{4}	1

==== Second qualifier ====
Qualifying competition
Alt	Ekaterina Yashina	0	3
	Anastasia Zakharova	6	6

==== Third qualifier ====
Qualifying competition
3	(Australia) Lizette Cabrera	5	4
WC	(France) Marine Partaud	7	6

==== Fourth qualifier ====
Qualifying competition
4	(Ukraine) Katarina Zavatska	4^{r}
WC	(France) Delia Gaillard	0
