= 2022 Trophee Lagardère – Doubles =

Doubles
- 2022 Trophee Lagardère

Final
- Champion: (Brazil) Beatriz Haddad Maia (France) Kristina Mladenovic
- Runner-up: (Georgia (country)) Oksana Kalashnikova (Japan) Miyu Kato
- Score: 5–7, 6–4, [10–4]

Events
Singles	Doubles
Clarins Open	· 2023 →

This was the first edition of the tournament.

Beatriz Haddad Maia and Kristina Mladenovic won the title, defeating Oksana Kalashnikova and Miyu Kato in the final, 5–7, 6–4, [10–4].

== Seeds ==
1. (Brazil) Beatriz Haddad Maia / (France) Kristina Mladenovic (champions)
2. (Georgia (country)) Oksana Kalashnikova / (Japan) Miyu Kato (final)
3. Anna Kalinskaya / Anastasia Potapova (semifinals)
4. (United Kingdom) Samantha Murray Sharan / (United States) Ingrid Neel (first round)

== Draw ==
=== Key ===
- Q = Qualifier
- WC = Wild card
- LL = Lucky loser
- Alt = Alternate
- SE = Special exempt
- PR = Protected ranking
- ITF = ITF entry
- JE = Junior exempt
- w/o = Walkover
- r = Retired
- d = Defaulted
- SR = Special ranking

=== Draw ===
First round
1	(Brazil) B Haddad Maia (France) K Mladenovic	6	6
(Netherlands) A Hartono (Australia) O Tjandramulia	1	2
(Hong Kong) E Chong (Thailand) P Plipuech	5	7^{7}	[8]
A Fomina-Klotz; E Yashina	7	6^{4}	[10]
4	(United Kingdom) S Murray Sharan (United States) I Neel	5	6	[7]
A Gasanova; K Rakhimova	7	4	[10]
(United States) H Baptiste (United States) C McHale	6	6
WC	(France) D Gaillard (South Korea) S-j Jang	1	1
(Czech Republic) L Fruhvirtová (Czech Republic) R Voráčová	6	5	[10]
A Gabueva; A Zakharova	3	7	[7]
(Switzerland) X Knoll (United Kingdom) E Webley-Smith	4	0
3	A Kalinskaya; A Potapova	6	6
V Gracheva (United Kingdom) H Watson	2	4
(France) E Jacquemot (France) S Janicijevic	6	6
(France) M Partaud (France) L Wargnier	2	1
2	(Georgia (country)) O Kalashnikova (Japan) M Kato	6	6

Quarterfinals
1	(Brazil) B Haddad Maia (France) K Mladenovic	6	6
A Fomina-Klotz; E Yashina	0	0
A Gasanova; K Rakhimova	6	2	[10]
(United States) H Baptiste (United States) C McHale	3	6	[5]
(Czech Republic) L Fruhvirtová (Czech Republic) R Voráčová	6^{4}	4
3	A Kalinskaya; A Potapova	7^{7}	6
(France) E Jacquemot (France) S Janicijevic	4	6	[5]
2	(Georgia (country)) O Kalashnikova (Japan) M Kato	6	4	[10]

Semifinals
1	(Brazil) B Haddad Maia (France) K Mladenovic	6	7
A Gasanova; K Rakhimova	3	5
3	A Kalinskaya; A Potapova	3	6	[9]
2	(Georgia (country)) O Kalashnikova (Japan) M Kato	6	3	[11]

Final
1	(Brazil) B Haddad Maia (France) K Mladenovic	5	6	[10]
2	(Georgia (country)) O Kalashnikova (Japan) M Kato	7	4	[4]
