= Katie Boulter =

British tennis player (born 1996)

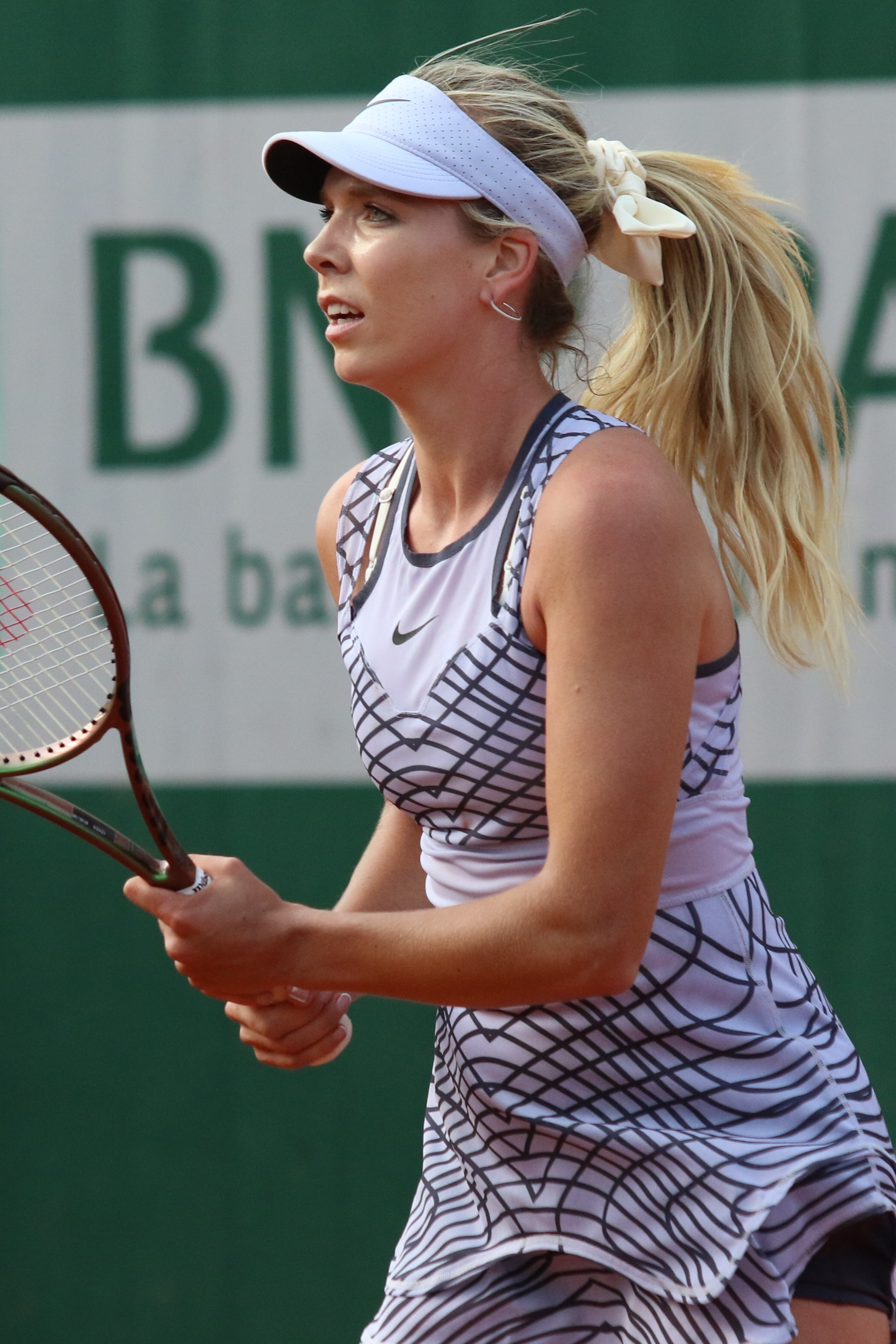
- Boulter at the 2023 French Open
- Full name: Katie Charlotte Boulter
- Country (sports): (United Kingdom) Great Britain
- Born: 1 August 1996 (age 30) Woodhouse Eaves, Leicestershire, England, UK
- Height: 1.82 m (6 ft 0 in)
- Plays: Right-handed (two-handed backhand)
- Coach: Michael Joyce
- Prize money: US$ 4,995,682

Singles
- Career record: 370–246
- Career titles: 4
- Highest ranking: No. 23 (4 November 2024)
- Current ranking: No. 49 (2 November 2026)

Grand Slam singles results
- Australian Open: 2R (2019, 2024, 2025)
- French Open: 2R (2025, 2026)
- Wimbledon: 3R (2022, 2023)
- US Open: 3R (2023)

Other tournaments
- Olympic Games: 1R (2024)

Doubles
- Career record: 48–46
- Career titles: 0
- Highest ranking: No. 225 (8 June 2026)
- Current ranking: No. 284 (2 November 2026)

Grand Slam doubles results
- Australian Open: 1R (2024)
- French Open: 1R (2024, 2026)
- Wimbledon: 1R (2017, 2018, 2026)
- US Open: 2R (2024, 2025)

Other doubles tournaments
- Olympic Games: QF (2024)

Grand Slam mixed doubles results
- Wimbledon: 2R (2023)

Team competitions
- BJK Cup: SF (2022, 2024, 2025), record 17–8
- Hopman Cup: RR (2019)
- Last updated on: 2 November 2026.

Katie Charlotte Boulter (born 1 August 1996) is a British professional tennis player. She has a career-high singles ranking of No. 23 by the WTA, achieved in November 2024, and a best in doubles of No. 225, reached in June 2026. Boulter has won four singles titles on the WTA Tour. She has also won one WTA 125 singles title, as well as seven singles and four doubles titles on the ITF Women's Circuit. She is the current British No. 1 in women's singles.

Boulter was ranked the No. 10 junior tennis player in the world in March 2014. She is based at the Lawn Tennis Association's National Tennis Centre in Roehampton and was coached by Jeremy Bates, Nigel Sears, Timothy Seals, and Mark Taylor.

== Early life ==
Boulter was born in Woodhouse Eaves, Leicestershire.

Boulter started playing tennis aged 5, and went on to represent Great Britain three years later, aged 8. She has said that when she was younger, beating her older brother was a motivating factor. "We used to practise together at this local court down the road from our house. It was the only thing I could eventually beat him in, so that felt great."

Boulter played the piano before her tennis career began to take precedence. She also has an interest in fashion and made an appearance in Vogue magazine in 2018.

== Career ==
=== 2008–2013: Steady rise ===
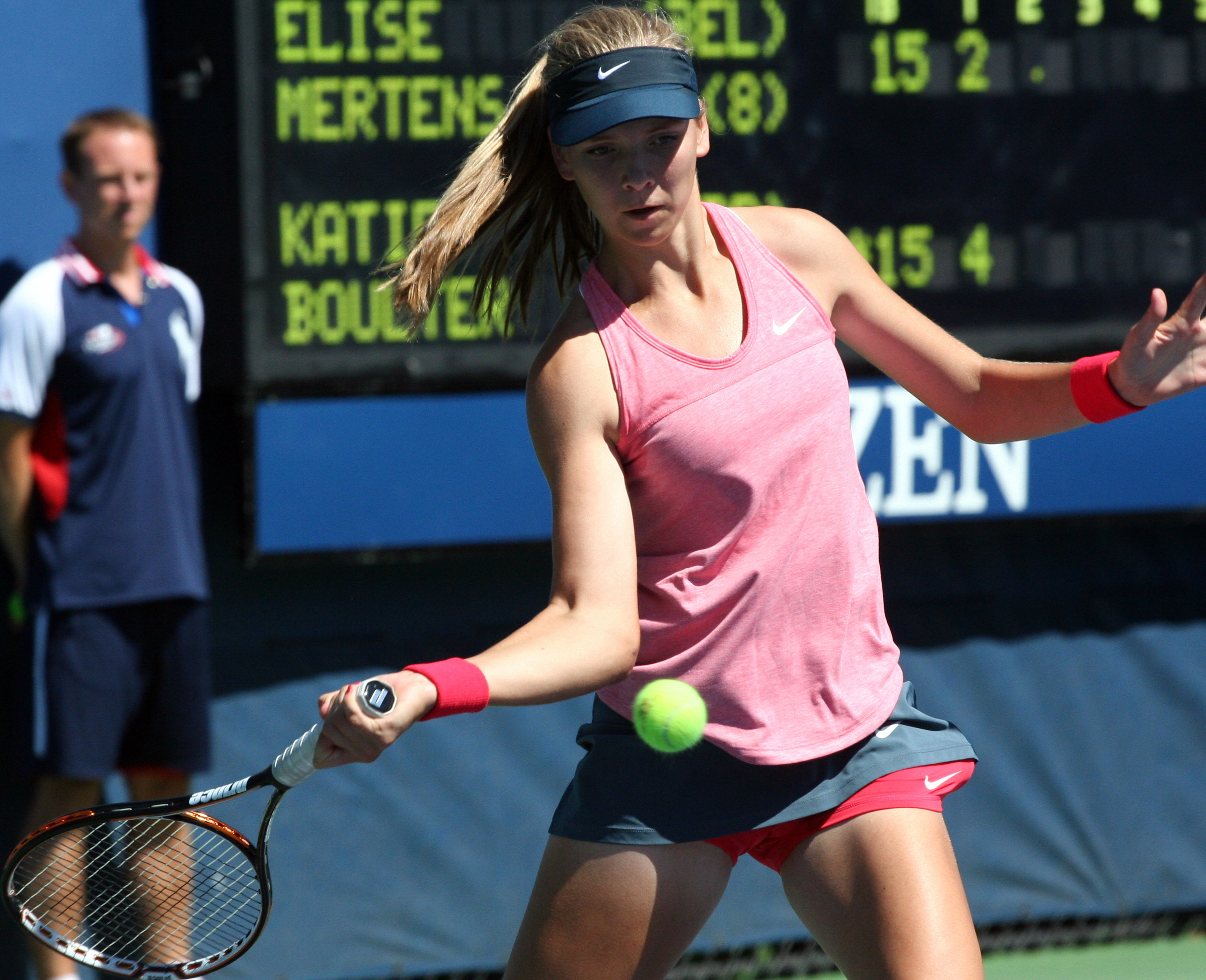
Boulter at the 2013 US Open

Following in the path of Anna Kournikova, Boulter showed promise in 2008 when she won the Lemon Bowl in Rome, aged 11. She went on in 2011, aged 14, to become a finalist in the Junior Orange Bowl Tennis Championships in Coral Gables, Florida. Past finalists have included Andy Murray and Caroline Wozniacki. She was awarded the Aegon Junior Player Award that month.

Boulter claimed her first senior doubles title at a $10k event in Sharm El Sheikh in November 2013.

=== 2014: Doubles success, first pro singles title ===
In January 2014, Boulter went on to have further doubles success and was a finalist at the Australian Open girls' doubles event with Ivana Jorović. In May 2014, in Sharm El Sheikh, Boulter won her first senior singles title over fellow Briton Eden Silva. She also won the doubles title at the same event partnering Nina Stojanović, to whom she had lost a previous final in singles. A month later, Boulter was given a wildcard for Wimbledon qualifying, losing in the first round to Italian Alberta Brianti in a three-set match which lasted two-and-a-half hours.

=== 2018: WTA Tour quarterfinal ===
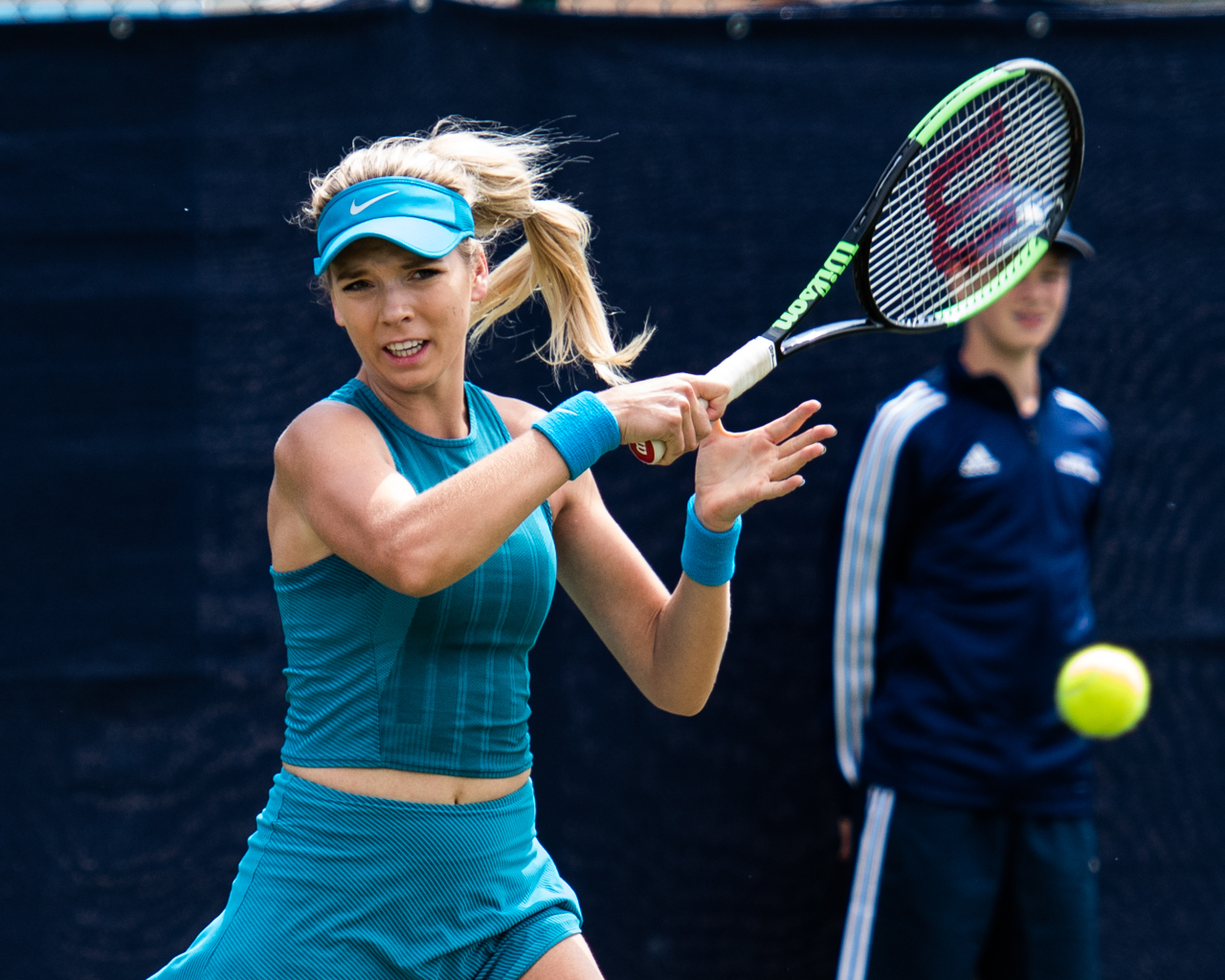
Boulter at the 2018 Surbiton Trophy.

Boulter won her first $25k singles title at the event in Óbidos, Portugal in April. In May, she won a further singles title at the $60k event in Fukuoka, Japan. She received a wildcard for the Nottingham Open, going on to reach her first WTA Tour quarterfinal with a run which included a win over former US Open champion Samantha Stosur. In July, Boulter received a wildcard into the $100k grass-court event in Southsea, England, where she reached the final and fell to Kirsten Flipkens.

She then received a wildcard into the Wimbledon main draw, where she won her first-round match over Verónica Cepede Royg. She lost in the second round to Naomi Osaka in straight sets.

=== 2019–2021: Major match wins, spinal injury ===
At the 2019 Australian Open. Boulter defeated Ekaterina Makarova, in three sets, with the first instance in the Australian Open of a third-set tiebreak, winning the tiebreak 10–6. However, her run ended in the second round with a straight-sets defeat by Aryna Sabalenka. Her next tournament was the St. Petersburg Ladies' Trophy where she entered the main draw as a lucky loser and was defeated by Ekaterina Alexandrova in three sets.

At the 2019 Mexican Open, she defeated Conny Perrin in the first round, before retiring with an injury during her next match against fifth seed Sofia Kenin. In April 2019, Boulter suffered a spinal stress fracture while playing for Great Britain in the Fed Cup. This kept her out of competitive action for several months including missing the French Open and Wimbledon. Boulter made her comeback in November 2919 at an ITF tournament in Thailand, losing to Joanna Garland in the first round.

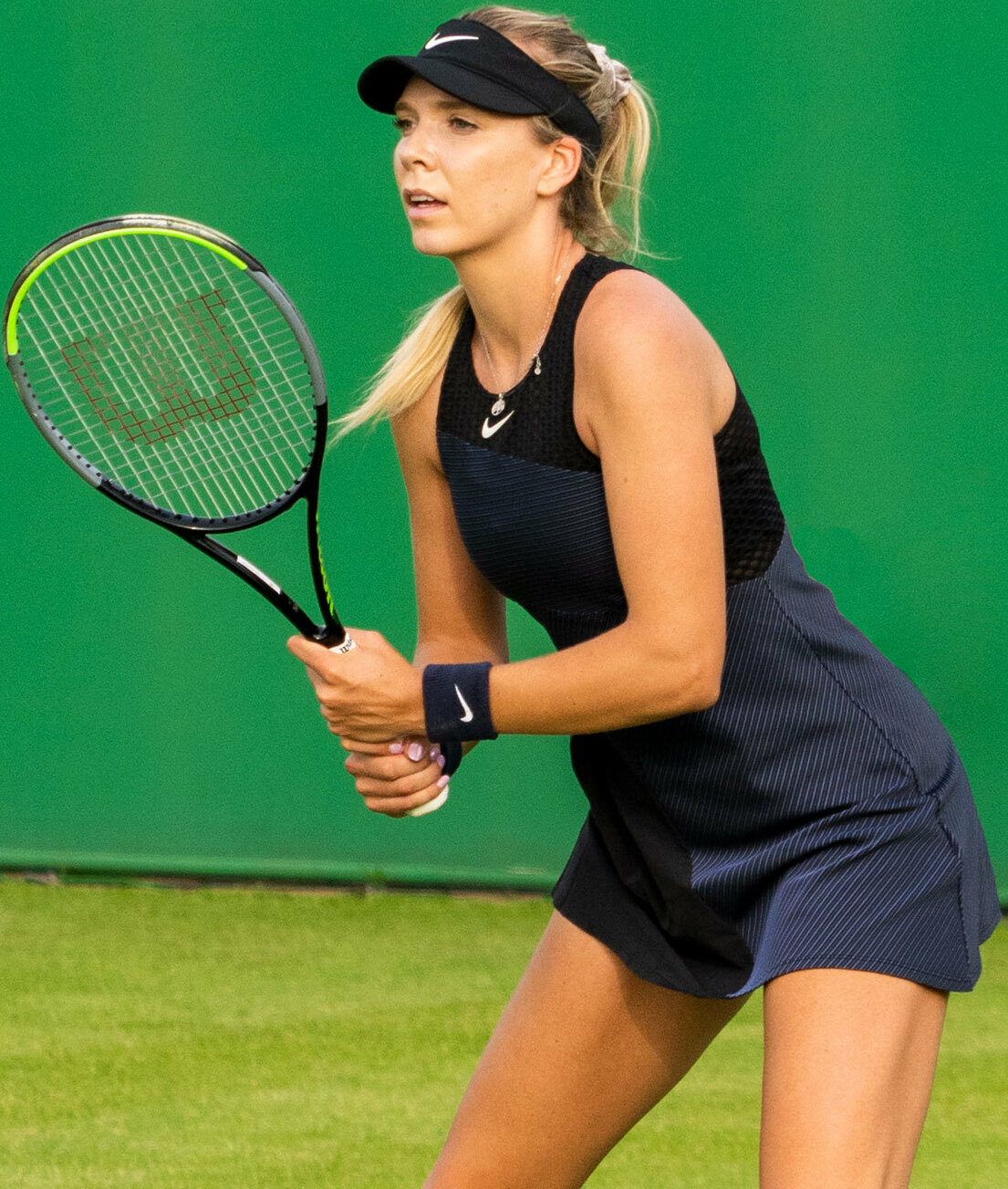
Boulter at the 2021 Nottingham Open

At the 2021 Australian Open, she suffered a first-round loss against Daria Kasatkina. At the 2021 Wimbledon Championships, she defeated qualifier Danielle Lao, before losing to second seed Aryna Sabalenka, in three sets, in the second round. She qualified for the main draw at the 2021 US Open, but lost in the first round to Liudmila Samsonova.

=== 2022: First top-10 wins and major third round ===
Having won an ITF tournament in February, Boulter had to retire from the WTA Tour event in Lyon in March due to a leg injury.

Boulter missed the clay-court season, but returned at the Nottingham Open in June where she came through qualifying to defeat Tatjana Maria in the first round, before losing to Ajla Tomljanović. Granted a wildcard for the Birmingham Classic, she defeated Alison Riske (her first win against a top-40 ranked player) and Caroline Garcia, before losing to Simona Halep. At Eastbourne, she was also handed a wildcard and defeated fourth seed and world No. 7, Karolina Plíšková, for her first top-10 win. She lost her last 16 match against Petra Kvitová in three sets.

At Wimbledon, Boulter again upset Plíšková in three sets to advance to the third round of a major for the first time in her career. In round three, Boulter lost to Harmony Tan, in straight sets.

=== 2023: British No. 1, first WTA Tour title, top 50 ===
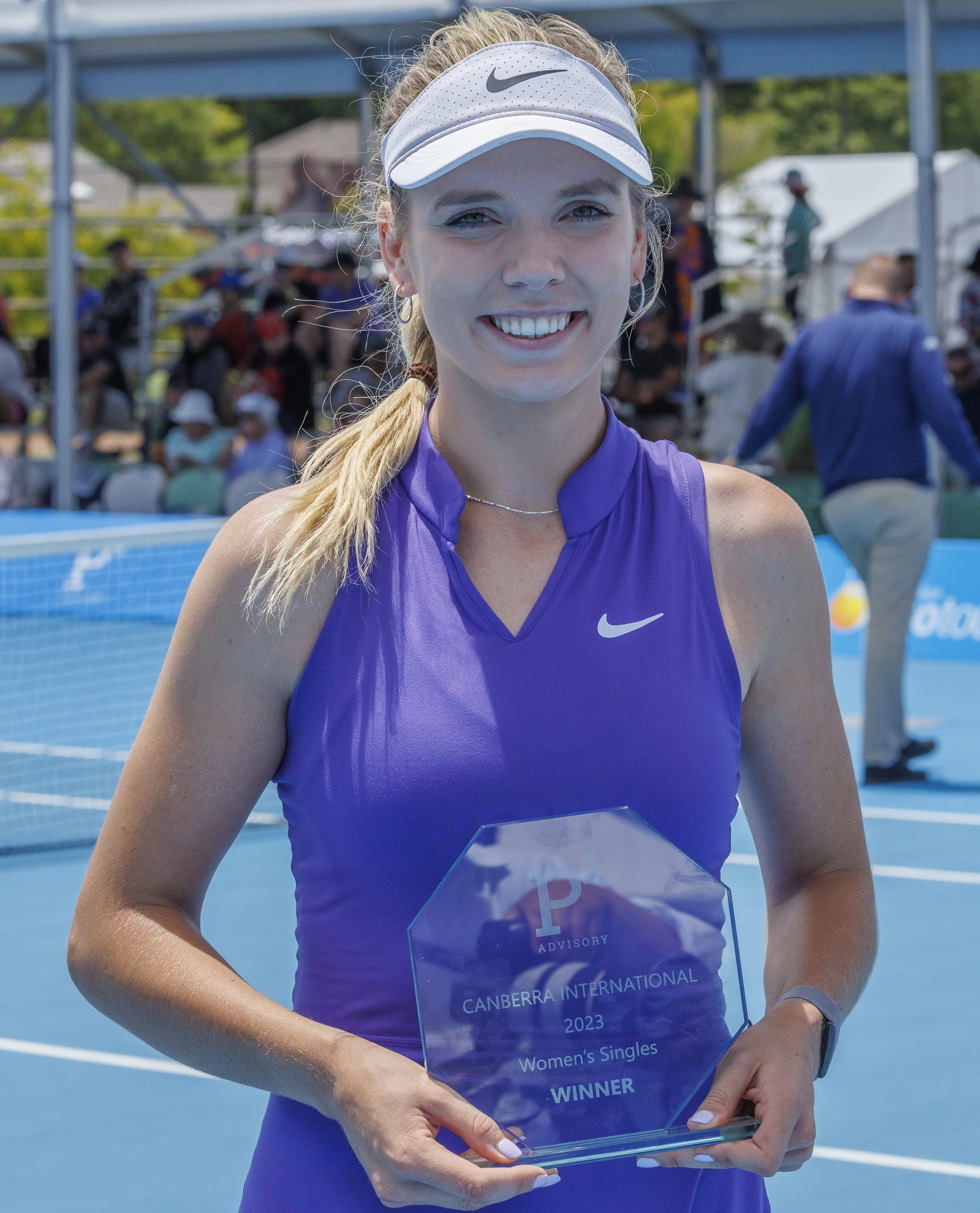
Boulter after winning the final at Canberra.

Boulter became the British player No. 1 on 12 June 2023, following a semifinal showing at the Surbiton Trophy. She reached the quarterfinals at the Nottingham Open as one of four British players for a historic first at a WTA Tour event. She went one step further to reach her first WTA Tour semifinal with a win over compatriot Harriet Dart. She defeated another Briton, Heather Watson, to set up an all-British final with Jodie Burrage, the first since 1977. Boulter won the final in straight sets to claim her first WTA Tour title. As a result, she returned to the top 100 in the rankings at No. 77 on 19 June 2023.

She received a special exempt entry into the next UK tournament in Birmingham, but lost in the first round to Zhu Lin in straight sets.

At Wimbledon, she defeated Australian Daria Saville in the first round and Bulgarian Viktoriya Tomova in the second, before losing to Elena Rybakina in an under-one-hour match. With Alex de Minaur in mixed doubles, she also went out in the second round.

Boulter came through two rounds of qualifying to gain a place in the main draw of the Canadian Open in Montreal. She won her first-round match against Rebecca Marino, but lost in round two to Coco Gauff. This result improved Boulter's singles ranking to a career-high ranking of No. 60, on 14 August 2023.

At the US Open, she entered the main draw via her ranking for the first time in her career. In the first round, she defeated Diane Parry in straight sets for her first-ever main-draw win at Flushing Meadows, and then beat Chinese player Wang Yafan, in three sets, in the second round. Boulter lost to Peyton Stearns in round three, in two sets, but reached the top 50 on 11 September 2023.

=== 2024: WTA 500 title & top 25 ===
Boulter was a member of the Great Britain team for the United Cup alongside Cameron Norrie. She defeated Jessica Pegula in the round-robin stage but the team was eliminated before the knock-out phase. She reached the second round of the Australian Open with a win over Yuan Yue but lost to 12th seed and eventual runner-up Zheng Qinwen. Boulter played the Linz Open where she defeated sixth seed Jasmine Paolini, before losing to Anastasia Pavlyuchenkova in the second round.

At the San Diego Open, the unseeded Boulter defeated Lesia Tsurenko, second seed Beatriz Haddad Maia, seventh seed Donna Vekić, and third seed Emma Navarro to reach her first WTA 500 final. In the final, she defeated the sixth seeded Marta Kostyuk achieving her first win at this level and taking her ranking into the top 30.

In April, Boulter helped Great Britain to a 3–1 win in an away tie against team France to make it into the Billie Jean King Cup finals. Having lost to Diane Parry 2–6, 0–6 on day one, Boulter defeated Clara Burel 7–5, 6–0 in the opening match of day two for what was her first Tour-level victory on clay.

Boulter retained her Nottingham Open title in June, defeating Emma Raducanu in the semifinals, and then Karolína Plíšková in the final on the same day at the tournament which was heavily affected by bad weather.

For the first time in her career, Boulter was seeded in the singles at Wimbledon. She defeated Tatjana Maria in two sets, but then lost to fellow Briton Harriet Dart in the second round, 8–10 in the third set tiebreaker.

Boulter lost in the first round of the singles at the Paris Summer Olympics, going down in straight sets to Anna Karolína Schmiedlová. Partnering Heather Watson, she reached the quarterfinals of the doubles, defeating sixth seeded Brazilian duo Beatriz Haddad Maia and Luisa Stefani in the second round, before losing to third seeds and eventual gold medalists Sara Errani and Jasmine Paolini from Italy.

In her first tournament after the Olympics, Boulter reached the third round of the Canadian Open for the first time in her career with wins over Bernarda Pera and 13th seed Beatriz Haddad Maia to set up a meeting with second seed Aryna Sabalenka which she lost.

Seeded 31st, she defeated qualifier Aliaksandra Sasnovich in the first round at the US Open, before losing her next match to Jéssica Bouzas Maneiro. Having received a bye into the second round, and seeded 26th, at the China Open, Boulter defeated Taylor Townsend in straight sets. She lost in the third round to fourth seed Coco Gauff. At the final WTA 1000 event of the season, the Wuhan Open, Boulter lost in the first round to qualifier Lesia Tsurenko.

Boulter defeated Sara Errani in the first round at the Ningbo Open to set up a meeting with sixth seed Beatriz Haddad Maia which she lost in straight sets. Seeded ninth at the Pan Pacific Open, She defeated qualifier Priscilla Hon, lucky loser Kyōka Okamura and Bianca Andreescu to reach the semifinals where she lost to wildcard entrant Sofia Kenin. At the Hong Kong Open, where she was second seed, Boulter defeated Aoi Ito, Wang Xiyu, Anastasia Zakharova and sixth seed Yue Yuan to reach in her third final of the year, which she lost to top seed Diana Shnaider. Despite the defeat, Boulter moved into the world's top-25 for the first time, reaching No. 23 in the WTA rankings.

At the BJK Cup finals in Spain, Boulter defeated Laura Siegemund in straight sets to seal Great Britain's first round win over Germany. She then overcame Leylah Fernandez as Great Britain defeated defending champions Canada to reach the semifinals. In their last four match against Slovakia, Boulter lost to Rebecca Šramková in three sets as Great Britain were defeated 2–1.

=== 2025: First clay-court title, rankings drop ===
At the United Cup, Boulter defeated Nadia Podoroska and then partnered Charles Broom to overcome María Lourdes Carlé and Tomás Martín Etcheverry as Great Britain won their opening group match against Argentina. She then defeated Australia's Olivia Gadecki as Great Britain progressed to the quarterfinals as group winners. They were knocked out of the competition in the last eight by Poland with Boulter losing to Iga Świątek, in three sets.

Seeded 22nd at the Australian Open, Boulter defeated Rebecca Marino but lost to Veronika Kudermetova in the second round.

Boulter was sidelined with a foot injury throughout February, missing the WTA 1000 events in Doha and Dubai. She returned to competitive action in March at Indian Wells where, after being given a bye in the first round, she defeated Irina-Camelia Begu, before losing to seventh seed Elena Rybakina in the third round. At the Miami Open, Boulter was defeated in the first round by Peyton Stearns.

In April, she defeated Tatjana Maria as Great Britain overcame Germany in their opening match in the BJK Cup qualifying round held in The Hague. Boulter then lost to Suzan Lamens, before teaming with Jodie Burrage to defeat Lamens and Demi Schuurs in the decisive doubles as Great Britain beat the Netherlands to secure a place at the finals. At the Madrid Open, she overcame Kateřina Siniaková to secure her first WTA Tour clay-court win. Boulter lost to sixth seed Jasmine Paolini in the second round. She was defeated by Anastasia Pavlyuchenkova in the first round at the Italian Open. The following week at the Trophée Clarins in Paris, Boulter claimed her maiden WTA 125 title and her first clay-court title at any level, defeating Erika Andreeva, Daria Saville, Elsa Jacquemot and eighth seed Varvara Gracheva to reach the final, where she overcame Chloé Paquet in three sets.

Boulter claimed her first win at the French Open by defeating qualifier Carole Monnet in her opening round match in three sets. She lost her next match to seventh seed Madison Keys in straight sets.

Moving onto the grass-court season at the Queen's Club Championships in London, Boulter defeated qualifier Ajla Tomljanović to reach the second round, where she lost to fifth seed Diana Shnaider in three sets. The defeat brought an end to her two year run as British No. 1.

Seeded eighth and as two-time defending champion at the Nottingham Open, Boulter defeated Lulu Sun and Sonay Kartal to make it through to the quarterfinals, where she lost to McCartney Kessler. Two weeks later at Wimbledon, she registered her fourth career win against a top-10 ranked opponent by overcoming ninth seed Paula Badosa in the first round. Boulter was eliminated in the second round by lucky loser Solana Sierra.

Moving onto the North American hardcourt swing, Boulter lost in the first round of the Washington Open to Maria Sakkari, the Canadian Open to Renata Zarazúa and the Cincinnati Open to Olga Danilović. She broke her losing streak by defeating Yuan Yue in the first round in Cleveland, but fell to Viktorija Golubic in her next match. At the US Open, Boulter lost to 27th seed Marta Kostyuk in the first round.

In September at the BJK Cup finals, Boulter defeated Moyuka Uchijima in straight sets as Great Britain overcame Japan 2–0 to reach the semifinals. In the last four, she lost to Jessica Pegula in three sets as the team were eliminated 2–0 by the USA. At the China Open, Boulter defeated Hailey Baptiste, before losing to third seed Amanda Anisimova in the second round. A win over second seed Linda Nosková saw her reach the second round at the Japan Women's Open, where she lost to Sorana Cîrstea. Boulter qualified for the main-draw at the Pan Pacific Open, but lost to fellow qualifier Eva Lys in the first round. At the Hong Kong Open, she retired due to injury, after losing the opening set of her first round match against Alexandra Eala. Having started the season ranked at world No. 23 and as the top British female player, Boulter dropped to world No. 100 and fourth in her country on 3 November 2025. Boulter ended the season ranked at world No. 106.

=== 2026: Fourth WTA Tour title, win over world No. 2 ===
Boulter started her 2026 season at Auckland in New Zealand, where she received a wildcard entry and defeated qualifier Yuliia Starodubtseva, before losing to top seed Elina Svitolina in the second round. At the Australian Open, she lost in the first round to 10th seed Belinda Bencic.

In February, at the Ostrava Open, Boulter defeated wildcard entrant Lucie Havlíčková, fifth seed Viktorija Golubic, Linda Fruhvirtová, and Katie Volynets to reach her fifth WTA Tour final. She won the championship match in three sets against Tamara Korpatsch to claim her fourth WTA Tour title. As a result, she moved back into the world's top 100 at No. 84. Given a wildcard entry into the main draw at the Mérida Open, Boulter overcame Beatriz Haddad Maia and Camila Osorio to reach the quarterfinals, at which point she lost to top seed Jasmine Paolini, in three sets. The following week, she lost in the second round of qualifying at Indian Wells to Victoria Jiménez Kasintseva. At the Miami Open, Boulter defeated Jéssica Bouzas Maneiro and 17th seed Clara Tauson to make it into the third round where her run was ended by 13th seed Karolína Muchová.

After opting to miss the BJK Cup qualifier against Australia, Boulter instead entered the Linz Open but lost in the first round to Elena-Gabriela Ruse in two sets with both being decided in tiebreaks. At the Open de Rouen, she defeated lucky loser Maria Timofeeva and third seed Jaqueline Cristian to reach her first WTA Tour clay-court quarterfinal, which she lost to qualifier Veronika Podrez in straight sets. Moving onto the Madrid Open, Boulter defeated Taylor Townsend, before losing to fifth seed Jessica Pegula in the second round. At the same tournament, she partnered with Venus Williams in the doubles, and the wildcard pairing overcame Jiang Xinyu and Xu Yifan. They lost their second-round match to seventh seeds Sofia Kenin and Hsieh Su-wei. At the Italian Open, she lost in the first round to Eva Lys in three sets. Defending her title at the WTA 125 Trophée Clarins, Boulter fell in the second round to Anastasia Zakharova in three sets. At the French Open, she defeated wildcard entrant Akasha Urhobo in three sets to reach the second round for the second year in a row, where she lost to 28th seed Anastasia Potapova, also in three sets.

Boulter began the grass-court season as a wildcard entrant at the Queen's Club Championships, defeating eighth seed Leylah Fernandez and Jaqueline Cristian to make it through to the quarterfinals. Next, she overcame world No. 2 and top seed, Elena Rybakina, to record the best win by ranking of her career to-date and reach the semifinals, where her run was ended by lucky loser Donna Vekić. Two weeks later at the Bad Homburg Open, again entering the main draw as a wildcard, Boulter lost to Leylah Fernandez in a match lasting three hours and 12 minutes. At Wimbledon, she lost in the first round to qualifier Tyra Grant.

Moving onto the North American hardcourt swing, Boulter opened her campaign at the Washington Open, where she lost to wildcard entrant Ashlyn Krueger in the first round. She also lost to a wildcard entrant in the first round at her next tournament, the Canadian Open, suffering a straight sets defeat against Kayla Cross. Boulter halted her five match-losing streak with a win over Katie Volynets at the Cincinnati Open, before losing to sixth seed Linda Nosková in the second round. At the US Open, she defeated wildcard entrant Carol Young Suh Lee to reach the second round, where she lost to seventh seed Karolína Muchová.

Boulter was part of Great Britain squad for the BJK Cup finals in Shenzhen, China, losing to Linda Nosková as they were eliminated by the Czech Republic in the quarterfinals. The next week at the China Open, she defeated qualifier Mai Hontama, before losing to seventh seed Karolína Muchová for the third time that year in the second round. At the Wuhan Open, Boulter lost in the first round to 11th seed Diana Shnaider. Seeded eighth at the Japan Open, she defeated wildcard entrant Himeno Sakatsume, Viktorija Golubic and Antonia Ružić to reach the semifinals, where she lost to Kateřina Siniaková. Despite her defeat, Boulter returned to the top 50 in the WTA rankings for the first time since September 2025 at world No. 48 on 26 October 2026. Seeded eighth at the Hong Kong Open, she defeated Viktorija Golubic, before losing to Claire Liu in the second round.

== Coaching ==
In November 2025, Boulter announced she had split from coach Biljana Veselinovic after three years working together.

On 2 January 2026, it was announced that Boulter had hired Michael Joyce as her new coach.

== Personal life ==
Boulter was diagnosed with chronic fatigue syndrome as a teenager. She is a supporter of Leicester City Football Club. Boulter got engaged to Australian tennis player Alex de Minaur on 23 December 2024. They married on 12 July 2026 in a private ceremony with close family and friends during the Wimbledon men's singles final in a Grade II listed church near Woodhouse Eaves where Boulter grew up.

Boulter said in June 2025 that she had suffered persistent and extreme online abuse, and was not alone among tennis players in suffering such abuse, which was partly from disgruntled gamblers.

== Performance timeline ==
Key
W	F	SF	QF	#R	RR	Q#	P#	DNQ	A	Z#	PO	G	S	B	NMS	NTI	P	NH

(W) winner; (F) finalist; (SF) semifinalist; (QF) quarterfinalist; (#R) rounds 4, 3, 2, 1; (RR) round-robin stage; (Q#) qualification round; (P#) preliminary round; (DNQ) did not qualify; (A) absent; (Z#) Davis/Fed Cup Zonal Group (with number indication) or (PO) play-off; (G) gold, (S) silver or (B) bronze Olympic/Paralympic medal; (NMS) not a Masters tournament; (NTI) not a Tier I tournament; (P) postponed; (NH) not held; (SR) strike rate (events won / competed); (W–L) win–loss record.
To avoid confusion and double counting, these charts are updated at the conclusion of a tournament or when the player's participation has ended.

Only main-draw results in WTA Tour, Grand Slam tournaments, Billie Jean King Cup and Olympic Games are included in win–loss records.

=== Singles ===
Current through the 2026 Wuhan Open

Katie Boulter Grand Slam singles statistics
Tournament	2014	2015	2016	2017	2018	2019	2020	2021	2022	2023	2024	2025	2026	SR	W–L	Win %
Grand Slam tournaments
Australian Open	A	A	A	A	Q1	2R	1R	1R	Q1	Q2	2R	2R	1R	0 / 6	3–6	33%
French Open	A	A	A	A	Q1	A	A	A	A	Q2	1R	2R	2R	0 / 3	2–3	40%
Wimbledon	Q1	A	Q2	1R	2R	A	NH	2R	3R	3R	2R	2R	1R	0 / 8	8–8	50%
US Open	A	A	A	Q3	Q1	A	A	1R	Q2	3R	2R	1R	2R	0 / 5	4–5	44%
Win–loss	0–0	0–0	0–0	0–1	1–1	1–1	0–1	1–3	2–1	4–2	3–4	3–4	2–4	0 / 22	17–22	44%
National representation
Summer Olympics	NH		A	NH				A	NH		1R	NH		0 / 1	0–1	0%
Billie Jean King Cup (Note: Formerly known as Fed Cup until 2020.)	A	A	A	A	POZ1	POZ1	QR (Note: Edition is split into the two years due to COVID-19.)		SF	QR	SF	SF	QF	0 / 4	17–8	70%
WTA 1000 tournaments
Qatar Open	A	NTI	A	NTI	A	NTI	A	NTI	A	NTI	A	A	A	0 / 0	0–0	–
Dubai Championships	NTI	A	NTI	A	NTI	A	NTI	A	NTI	A	A	A	A	0 / 0	0–0	–
Indian Wells Open	A	A	A	A	A	Q2	NH	Q1	1R	Q2	1R	3R	Q2	0 / 3	1–3	25%
Miami Open	A	A	A	A	1R	Q1	NH	2R	A	A	4R	1R	3R	0 / 5	5–5	50%
Madrid Open	A	A	A	A	A	A	NH	A	A	A	2R	2R	2R	0 / 3	2–3	40%
Italian Open	A	A	A	A	A	A	A	A	A	A	2R	2R	1R	0 / 3	0–3	0%
Canadian Open	A	A	A	A	1R	A	NH	A	A	2R	3R	1R	1R	0 / 5	3–5	38%
Cincinnati Open	A	A	A	A	A	A	A	A	A	Q1	1R	1R	2R	0 / 3	1–3	25%
China Open	A	A	A	A	1R	A	NH			2R	3R	2R	2R	0 / 5	4–5	44%
Wuhan Open	A	A	A	A	A	A	NH				1R	Q1	1R	0 / 2	0–2	0%
Win–loss	0–0	0–0	0–0	0–0	0–3	0–0	0–0	1–1	0–1	2–2	5–8	3–7	5–7	0 / 29	16–29	36%
Career statistics
	2014	2015	2016	2017	2018	2019	2020	2021	2022	2023	2024	2025	2026	Career		
Tournaments	0	0	0	1	8	3	2	10	8	8	18	20	10	Career total: 62		
Titles	0	0	0	0	0	0	0	0	0	1	2	0	1	Career total: 4		
Finals	0	0	0	0	0	0	0	0	0	1	2	0	1	Career total: 4		
Hard win–loss	0–0	0–0	0–0	0–0	3–5	7–4	1–2	6–8	2–5	3–5	22–14	8–14	11–6	2 / 41	63–63	50%
Clay win–loss	0–0	0–0	0–0	0–0	0–0	0–0	0–0	0–0	0–0	0–0	0–4	2–3	3–4	0 / 11	5–11	31%
Grass win–loss	0–0	0–0	0–0	0–1	3–3	0–0	0–0	4–2	7–4	7–3	8–3	4–3	0–0	2 / 21	33–19	63%
Overall win–loss	0–0	0–0	0–0	0–1	6–8	7–4	1–2	10–10	9–9	10–8	30–21	14–20	14–10	4 / 97	101–93	52%
Year-end ranking (Note: 2013: WTA ranking–775.)	411	889	368	199	100	352	365	148	124	56	24	100		$4,267,137		

== WTA Tour finals ==
=== Singles: 5 (4 titles, 1 runner-up) ===
Legend WTA 500 (1–0) WTA 250 (3–1)	Finals by surface Hard (2–1) Grass (2–0)	Finals by setting Outdoor (3–1) Indoor (1–0)

Result	W–L	Date	Tournament	Tier	Surface	Opponent	Score
Win	1–0	Jun 2023	Nottingham Open, UK	WTA 250	Grass	(United Kingdom) Jodie Burrage	6–3, 6–3
Win	2–0	Mar 2024	San Diego Open, US	WTA 500	Hard	(Ukraine) Marta Kostyuk	5–7, 6–2, 6–2
Win	3–0	Jun 2024	Nottingham Open, UK (2)	WTA 250	Grass	(Czech Republic) Karolína Plíšková	4–6, 6–3, 6–2
Loss	3–1	Nov 2024	Hong Kong Open, China SAR	WTA 250	Hard	Diana Shnaider	1–6, 2–6
Win	4–1	Feb 2026	Ostrava Open, Czech Republic	WTA 250	Hard (i)	(Germany) Tamara Korpatsch	5–7, 6–2, 6–1

== WTA 125 finals ==
=== Singles: 1 (title) ===
Result	W–L	Date	Tournament	Surface	Opponent	Score
Win	1–0	May 2025	Clarins Open, France	Clay	(France) Chloé Paquet	3–6, 6–2, 6–3

== ITF Circuit finals ==
=== Singles: 16 (7 titles, 9 runner-ups) ===
Legend $100,000 tournaments (0–1) $60,000 tournaments (3–2) $25,000 tournaments (1–2) $10/15,000 tournaments (3–4)	Finals by surface Hard (5–4) Grass (0–2) Carpet (2–3)

Result	W–L	Date	Tournament	Tier	Surface	Opponent	Score
Loss	0–1	Apr 2014	ITF Sharm El Sheikh, Egypt	10,000	Hard	(Republic of Ireland) Amy Bowtell	7–6^{(7–5)}, 0–6, 6–7^{(6–8)}
Loss	0–2	May 2014	ITF Sharm El Sheikh, Egypt	10,000	Hard	(Serbia) Nina Stojanović	6–3, 4–6, 3–6
Win	1–2	May 2014	ITF Sharm El Sheikh, Egypt	10,000	Hard	(United Kingdom) Eden Silva	4–6, 6–4, 7–5
Loss	1–3	Nov 2014	ITF Phuket, Thailand	15,000	Hard (i)	(France) Irina Ramialison	3–6, 0–6
Win	2–3	Apr 2016	ITF Sharm El Sheikh, Egypt	10,000	Hard	(Russia) Anastasia Pribylova	4–6, 6–3, 7–5
Loss	2–4	Mar 2017	ITF Mildura, Australia	25,000	Grass	(Slovakia) Viktória Kužmová	2–6, 4–6
Win	3–4	Apr 2017	ITF İstanbul, Turkey	15,000	Hard (i)	(Turkey) Ayla Aksu	6–3, 3–6, 6–3
Loss	3–5	May 2017	Kurume Cup, Japan	60,000	Carpet	(United Kingdom) Laura Robson	3–6, 4–6
Loss	3–6	Oct 2017	ITF Óbidos, Portugal	25,000	Carpet	(United Kingdom) Katie Swan	0–5 ret.
Win	4–6	Apr 2018	ITF Óbidos, Portugal	25,000	Carpet	(Poland) Urszula Radwańska	4–6, 6–3, 6–3
Win	5–6	May 2018	Fukuoka International, Japan	60,000	Carpet	(Russia) Ksenia Lykina	5–7, 6–4, 6–2
Loss	5–7	Jul 2018	Southsea Trophy, UK	100,000+H	Grass	(Belgium) Kirsten Flipkens	4–6, 7–5, 3–6
Loss	5–8	Oct 2020	ITF Sharm El Sheikh, Egypt	W15	Hard	(Chinese Taipei) Joanna Garland	3–6, 6–3, 3–6
Win	6–8	Feb 2022	Grenoble Open, France	W60	Hard (i)	Anna Blinkova	7–6^{(7–2)}, 6–7^{(6–8)}, 6–2
Win	7–8	Jan 2023	Canberra International, Australia	W60	Hard	(United Kingdom) Jodie Burrage	3–6, 6–3, 6–2
Loss	7–9	May 2023	Fukuoka International, Japan	W60	Carpet	(Japan) Natsumi Kawaguchi	walkover

=== Doubles: 7 (4 titles, 3 runner-ups) ===
Legend $25,000 tournaments $10/15,000 tournaments (4–3)	Finals by surface Hard (3–3) Carpet (1–0)

Result	W–L	Date	Tournament	Tier	Surface	Partner	Opponents	Score
Win	1–0	Nov 2013	ITF Sharm El Sheikh, Egypt	10,000	Hard	(Belgium) Justine De Sutter	(Russia) Natela Dzalamidze (Ukraine) Yuliya Hnateyko	6–4, 7–6^{(6)}
Loss	1–1	Feb 2014	ITF Nonthaburi, Thailand	10,000	Hard	(China) Xun Fangying	(China) Han Xinyun (China) Zhang Kailin	3–6, 0–6
Win	2–1	May 2014	ITF Sharm El Sheikh, Egypt	10,000	Hard	(Serbia) Nina Stojanović	(China) Dong Xiaorong (Austria) Pia König	6–4, 6–2
Win	3–1	May 2014	ITF Sharm El Sheikh, Egypt	10,000	Hard	(Serbia) Nina Stojanović	(Kazakhstan) Ekaterina Klyueva (Russia) Sofia Smagina	6–2, 6–3
Win	4–1	Jul 2014	ITF Imola, Italy	15,000	Carpet	(United Kingdom) Katy Dunne	(Italy) Anna Remondina (Switzerland) Lisa Sabino	7–6^{(8)}, 6–3
Loss	4–2	Aug 2014	ITF Nottingham, UK	10,000	Hard	(United Kingdom) Freya Christie	(Australia) Alison Bai (Japan) Mari Tanaka	4–6, 3–6
Loss	4–3	Apr 2016	ITF Sharm El Sheikh, Egypt	10,000	Hard	(Ukraine) Oleksandra Korashvili	(Austria) Melanie Klaffner (Germany) Julia Wachaczyk	4–6, 6–2, [11–13]

== Junior Grand Slam tournament finals ==
=== Doubles: 1 (runner-up) ===
Result	Year	Tournament	Surface	Partner	Opponents	Score
Loss	2014	Australian Open	Hard	(Serbia) Ivana Jorović	(Ukraine) Anhelina Kalinina (Russia) Elizaveta Kulichkova	4–6, 2–6

== Wins against top 10 players ==
- Boulter's match record against players who were, at the time the match was played, ranked in the top 10.

Season	2022	2023	2024	2025	2026	Total
Wins	2	0	1	1	1	5

#	Player	Rk	Event	Surface	Rd	Score	Rk	Ref
2022
1.	(Czech Republic) Karolína Plíšková	7	Eastbourne, UK	Grass	2R	1–6, 6–4, 6–4	127	
2.	(Czech Republic) Karolína Plíšková	7	Wimbledon, UK	Grass	2R	3–6, 7–6^{(4)}, 6–4	118	
2024
3.	(United States) Jessica Pegula	5	United Cup, Australia	Hard	RR	5–7, 6–4, 6–4	56	
2025
4.	(Spain) Paula Badosa	9	Wimbledon, UK	Grass	1R	6–2, 3–6, 6–4	43	
2026
5.	(Kazakhstan) Elena Rybakina	2	Queen's Club, UK	Grass	QF	7–5, 2–6, 6–4	73	
