= Racing Club de France =

Multisports club in France

- Full name: Racing Club de France
- Nicknames: Les Ciels et Blancs (The sky-blues and whites); Les Pingouins (The Penguins)
- Founded: 20 April 1882; 144 years ago (as Racing Club); 21 November 1885; 141 years ago (as Racing Club de France)
- Based in: Bois de Boulogne, Paris, France
- Colours: Sky blue White
- President: Philippe Baudillon
- Website: racingclubdefrance.fr

Racing Club de France, also known as RCF, is a French multisports club that was founded on 20 April 1882 under the name Racing Club. Racing Club changed its name to Racing Club de France (RCF) on 21 November 1885. The club is located at the Bois de Boulogne in Paris with club colours of sky blue and white.

== Departments ==
The club offers the following sports:

- Association football
- Athletics
- Badminton
- Boxing
- Competitive swimming
- Contract bridge
- Cycle sport
- Dancesport
- Fencing
- Field hockey
- Fitness training
- Golf
- Judo
- Rugby union
- Shooting sports
- Skiing
- Tennis
- Volleyball
- Water polo
- Yoga
- Zumba

== Field hockey ==
=== Honours ===
==== Men ====
French champions: 22

- 1899, 1903, 1909, 1926, 1929, 1930, 1943, 1960, 1961, 1979, 1983, 1985, 1990, 1991, 1992, 1993, 1994, 1995, 1996, 2015, 2016, 2017

==== Women ====
French champions: 13

- 1923, 1924, 1926, 1930, 1932, 1933, 1935, 1936, 1955, 1956, 1957, 1966, 1972

== Tennis ==
The 1926 French Championships were held on the courts of Racing Club de France at the Croix-Catelan. The clay courts of the club have hosted two Women's Tennis Association tournaments, the Clarins Open between 1987 and 1992, and the Trophée Lagardère in 2022, subsequently known as the Trophée Clarins since 2023.
