= Clarins Open =

Tennis tournament in Paris, France

WTA 125K series
- Event name: Trophée Clarins
- Tour: WTA Tour
- Founded: 1987
- Editions: 5
- Location: Paris, France
- Venue: Lagardère Paris Racing
- Category: WTA Tier V (1987–1989); WTA Tier IV (1990–1992); WTA 125 (2022–)
- Surface: Clay / outdoor
- Draw: 32S / 8D / 8Q
- Prize money: €115,000
- Website: tropheeclarins.com

Current champions (2026)
- Singles: (France) Diane Parry
- Doubles: (Japan) Shuko Aoyama (Chinese Taipei) Liang En-shuo

The Trophée Clarins is a WTA tennis tournament played from 1987 to 1992 as a WTA V/IV Tier event, and since 2022 as a WTA 125 event. It is held in Paris, France, and played on the outdoor clay courts of the Racing Club de France. The tournament is named for the main sponsor, Clarins, the luxury French cosmetics company.

It was a Tier V tournament until 1989 and was subsequently promoted to Tier IV, raising prize money from $50,000 to $150,000. In 1993, the WTA Tier IV event was replaced by the Open Gaz de France. In 2022, a WTA 125 tournament was introduced at the venue under its sponsored name, Trophée Lagardère, with a total financial commitment of $115,000.

== Past finals (WTA Tour) ==
=== Singles ===
Year	Champion	Runner-up	Score
1987	(Socialist Federal Republic of Yugoslavia) Sabrina Goleš	(Belgium) Sandra Wasserman	7–5, 6–1
1988	(Czechoslovakia) Petra Langrová	(Belgium) Sandra Wasserman	7–6^{(7–0)}, 6–2
1989	(Italy) Sandra Cecchini	(Czechoslovakia) Regina Rajchrtová	6–4, 6–7^{(5–7)}, 6–1
1990	(Spain) Conchita Martínez	(Argentina) Patricia Tarabini	7–5, 6–3
1991	(Spain) Conchita Martínez	(Argentina) Inés Gorrochategui	6–0, 6–3
1992	(Italy) Sandra Cecchini	(Switzerland) Emanuela Zardo	6–2, 6–1
1993	Discontinued (see Open Gaz de France)		

=== Doubles ===
Year	Champions	Runners-up	Score
1987	(France) Isabelle Demongeot (France) Nathalie Tauziat	(Italy) Sandra Cecchini (Socialist Federal Republic of Yugoslavia) Sabrina Goleš	1–6, 6–3, 6–3
1988	(France) Alexia Dechaume (France) Emmanuelle Derly	(Australia) Louise Field (France) Nathalie Herreman	6–0, 6–2
1989	(Italy) Sandra Cecchini (Argentina) Patricia Tarabini	(France) Nathalie Herreman (France) Catherine Suire	6–1, 6–1
1990	(Australia) Kristin Godridge (Australia) Kirrily Sharpe	(France) Alexia Dechaume (France) Nathalie Herreman	4–6, 6–3, 6–1
1991	(Czechoslovakia) Petra Langrová (Czechoslovakia) Radka Zrubáková	(France) Alexia Dechaume (France) Julie Halard	6–4, 6–4
1992	(Italy) Sandra Cecchini (Argentina) Patricia Tarabini	(Australia) Rachel McQuillan (France) Noëlle van Lottum	7–5, 6–1
1993	Discontinued (see Open Gaz de France)		

== Past finals (WTA 125) ==
=== Singles ===
Year	Champion	Runner-up	Score
2022	(United States) Claire Liu	(Brazil) Beatriz Haddad Maia	6–3, 6–4
2023	(France) Diane Parry	(United States) Caty McNally	walkover
2024	Diana Shnaider	(United States) Emma Navarro	6–2, 3–6, 6–4
2025	(United Kingdom) Katie Boulter	(France) Chloé Paquet	3–6, 6–2, 6–3
2026	(France) Diane Parry (2)	(United States) Madison Keys	3–6, 3–3 retd.

=== Doubles ===
Year	Champions	Runners-up	Score
2022	(Brazil) Beatriz Haddad Maia (France) Kristina Mladenovic	(Georgia (country)) Oksana Kalashnikova (Japan) Miyu Kato	5–7, 6–4, [10–4]
2023	(Kazakhstan) Anna Danilina; Vera Zvonareva	(Ukraine) Nadiia Kichenok (United States) Alycia Parks	5–7, 7–6^{(7–2)}, [14–12]
2024	(United States) Asia Muhammad (Indonesia) Aldila Sutjiadi	(Romania) Monica Niculescu (China) Zhu Lin	7–6^{(7–3)}, 4–6, [11–9]
2025	Irina Khromacheva (Hungary) Fanny Stollár	(Slovakia) Tereza Mihalíková (United Kingdom) Olivia Nicholls	4–6, 7–6^{(7–5)}, [10–5]
2026	(Japan) Shuko Aoyama (Chinese Taipei) Liang En-shuo	(Ukraine) Lyudmyla Kichenok (United States) Desirae Krawczyk	7–6^{(7–5)}, 6–2

== See also ==
- French Open
- Paris Masters
- Open GDF Suez
