= Diane Parry =

French tennis player (born 2002)

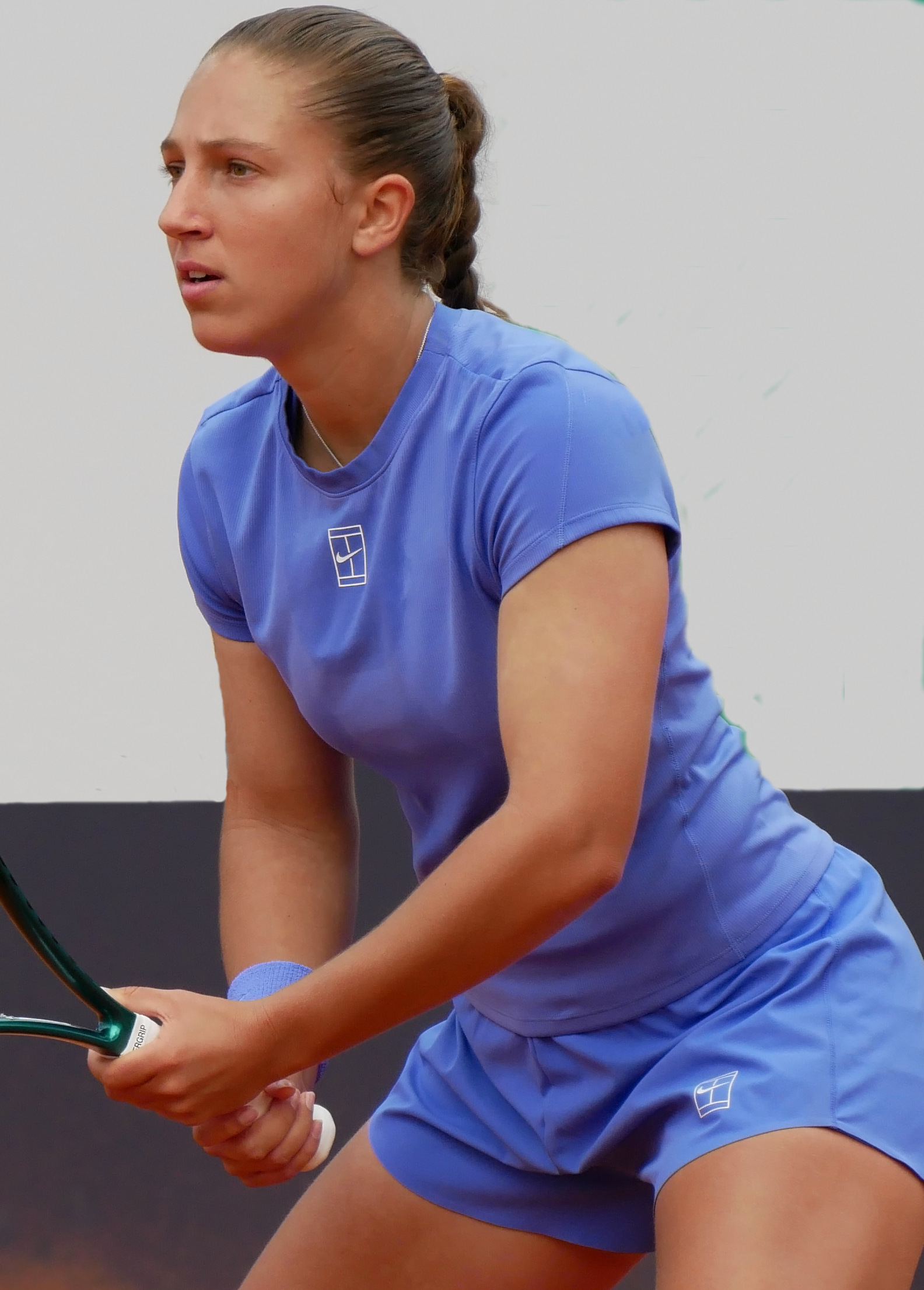
- Parry at the 2026 Italian Open
- Country (sports): France
- Residence: Dubai, United Arab Emirates
- Born: 1 September 2002 (age 24) Nice, France
- Height: 1.70 m (5 ft 7 in)
- Turned pro: 2017
- Plays: Right (one and two-handed backhand)
- Coach: Martin Vilar
- Prize money: US$ 4,516,733

Singles
- Career record: 253–207
- Career titles: 1
- Highest ranking: No. 30 (14 September 2026)
- Current ranking: No. 34 (9 November 2026)

Grand Slam singles results
- Australian Open: 3R (2024)
- French Open: 4R (2026)
- Wimbledon: 3R (2022, 2025)
- US Open: 3R (2025)

Other tournaments
- Olympic Games: 2R (2024)

Doubles
- Career record: 61–58
- Career titles: 2
- Highest ranking: No. 74 (4 December 2023)
- Current ranking: No. 483 (9 November 2026)

Grand Slam doubles results
- Australian Open: 2R (2025)
- French Open: 3R (2019, 2023, 2025)
- Wimbledon: 2R (2022, 2024)
- US Open: 3R (2024)

Other doubles tournaments
- Olympic Games: 2R (2024)

Grand Slam mixed doubles results
- French Open: 2R (2025)
- Last updated on: 12 November 2026.

Diane Parry (French pronunciation: [djan paʁi]; born 1 September 2002) is a French professional tennis player. She has a career-high WTA singles ranking of No. 30, achieved on 14 September 2026. On 4 December 2023, she peaked at No. 74 in the doubles rankings. Parry has won three WTA Tour titles, one in singles and two in doubles.

== Early life ==
Diane Parry was born on 1 September 2002 in Nice, France, while her parents were on holiday, and grew up in Boulogne-Billancourt, near Paris. Her father, Joël, played recreational tennis, while her mother, Françoise, practiced handball. She is the fourth of five children, with three older brothers and a younger sister, Alyssia.

Parry began playing tennis at around the age of five at the Tennis Club de Boulogne-Billancourt (TCBB), inspired by her older brothers, who also played at the club. Her first coach, Cécile Palicot, trained her throughout much of her childhood, until she was approximately eleven years old. At the age of twelve, Parry switched from a two-handed to a one-handed backhand, inspired by her childhood idol Roger Federer. Around the same age, she was diagnosed with scoliosis and had to wear a back brace, keeping her away from tennis for six months.

Parry attended Dupanloup primary school, located opposite the Roland-Garros stadium, before enrolling at Jean-de-la-Fontaine school, where she followed a timetable adapted to her tennis training. At the age of fourteen, she joined the French Tennis Federation's National Training Centre in Paris, where she was coached by former professional player Julie Coin between the ages of fourteen and sixteen. She later continued her secondary education through distance learning to accommodate her tennis career.

== Juniors ==
Parry reached the semifinals of the girls' singles event at the 2019 Wimbledon Championships and the girls' doubles event at the 2019 French Open. She reached a career-high ITF junior combined ranking of world No. 1 on 21 October 2019 and was named the 2019 ITF Junior World Champion.

== Career ==
=== 2017: WTA Tour debut ===
She made her WTA Tour main-draw debut at the French Open thanks to a wildcard, partnering Giulia Morlet; they were defeated by the 13th-seeded pair of Kiki Bertens and Johanna Larsson, in two sets in the first round.

Parry won her first ITF World Tour title in Hammamet, Tunisia, partnering Yasmine Mansouri.

=== 2018–2019: Major debut ===
She made her Grand Slam tournament singles debut at the 2018 French Open, entering the qualifying event as a wildcard, where she upset No. 5 seed Jana Fett in the first round, before losing to Rebecca Šramková in the second. Parry made her major main-draw debut at the 2019 French Open also as a wildcard, losing in the second round to No. 20 seed Elise Mertens, after having won against Vera Lapko in the first. Later that year, she also made her US Open debut as a wildcard, losing in the first round against Kristýna Plíšková.

=== 2020–2021: First WTA 125 title ===
In 2020, Parry won her first ITF Circuit singles title in Antalya, Turkey against Berfu Cengiz in the final. In 2021, she won three additional ITF titels, in Périgueux, France, Turin, Italy, and Seville, Spain, bringing her perfect record to 4–0 in ITF Circuit finals.

She reached her first final on the WTA Challenger Tour at the Argentine Open, losing to Anna Bondár, in straight sets. Two weeks later, she won her first WTA 125 tournament at the Uruguay Open, winning the final against Panna Udvardy.

=== 2022: First French Open third round & top 10 win ===
Parry made the second round at the French Open defeating defending champion and world No. 2, Barbora Krejčíková, her first career match against a top-10 player and a top-50 player. Next, she defeated Camila Osorio to reach the third round of a Grand Slam tournament for the first time in her career. She lost to Sloane Stephens in the third round.

=== 2023: Two WTA Tour doubles titles ===
Playing at the Mérida Open with Caty McNally, Parry won her maiden career doubles title, beating Wang Xinyu and Wu Fang-hsien in the final.

Partnering with Anna Bondár, she won the doubles title at the Lausanne Open, defeating Amina Anshba and Anastasia Dețiuc in the final.

Parry was runner-up in the singles at the Montevideo Open, losing the final to Renata Zarazúa in three sets.

=== 2024: Australian third round, three tour semifinals, top 50 ===
Parry reached the third round of the Australian Open for the first time at this major, defeating 30th seed Wang Xinyu and Kamilla Rakhimova, before losing to Mirra Andreeva.

On her debut at the WTA 1000 level, at the Indian Wells Open, she recorded her first wins at this level, reaching the fourth round by defeating Martina Trevisan, 29th seed Leylah Fernandez and Anna Blinkova. Her run was ended by ninth seed Maria Sakkari At the next WTA 1000, the Miami Open, Parry reached the second round defeating Jaqueline Cristian, before losing to 11th seed Beatriz Haddad Maia in three sets. As a result, she reached the top 50, a week later on 8 April 2025.

She reached her first grass-court semifinal at the Nottingham Open, losing to sixth seed Karolina Plíšková, having overcome Cristina Bucșa, Daria Saville and Kimberly Birrell on her way to the last four.

As the top seed, Parry made it through to the quarterfinals at the Swedish Open with wins over wildcard Caijsa Hennemann and Darja Semenistaja, before losing to seventh seed Martina Trevisan. She defeated qualifier Olivia Gadecki, Jil Teichmann and Chloé Paquet to reach the semifinals at the Palermo Ladies Open, where she lost to top seed Zheng Qinwen.

Partnering with Harriet Dart, Parry reached the round of 16 in the doubles at the US Open by a three-set win over Olympic champions and sixth seeds, Sara Errani and Jasmine Paolini, in the second round. They lost to 10th seeds Chan Hao-ching and Veronika Kudermetova. Seeded seventh, Parry made her third WTA Tour semifinal of the year at the Japan Women's Open, recording wins over Erika Andreeva, Greet Minnen and Clara Tauson, before losing to eventual champion Suzan Lamens.

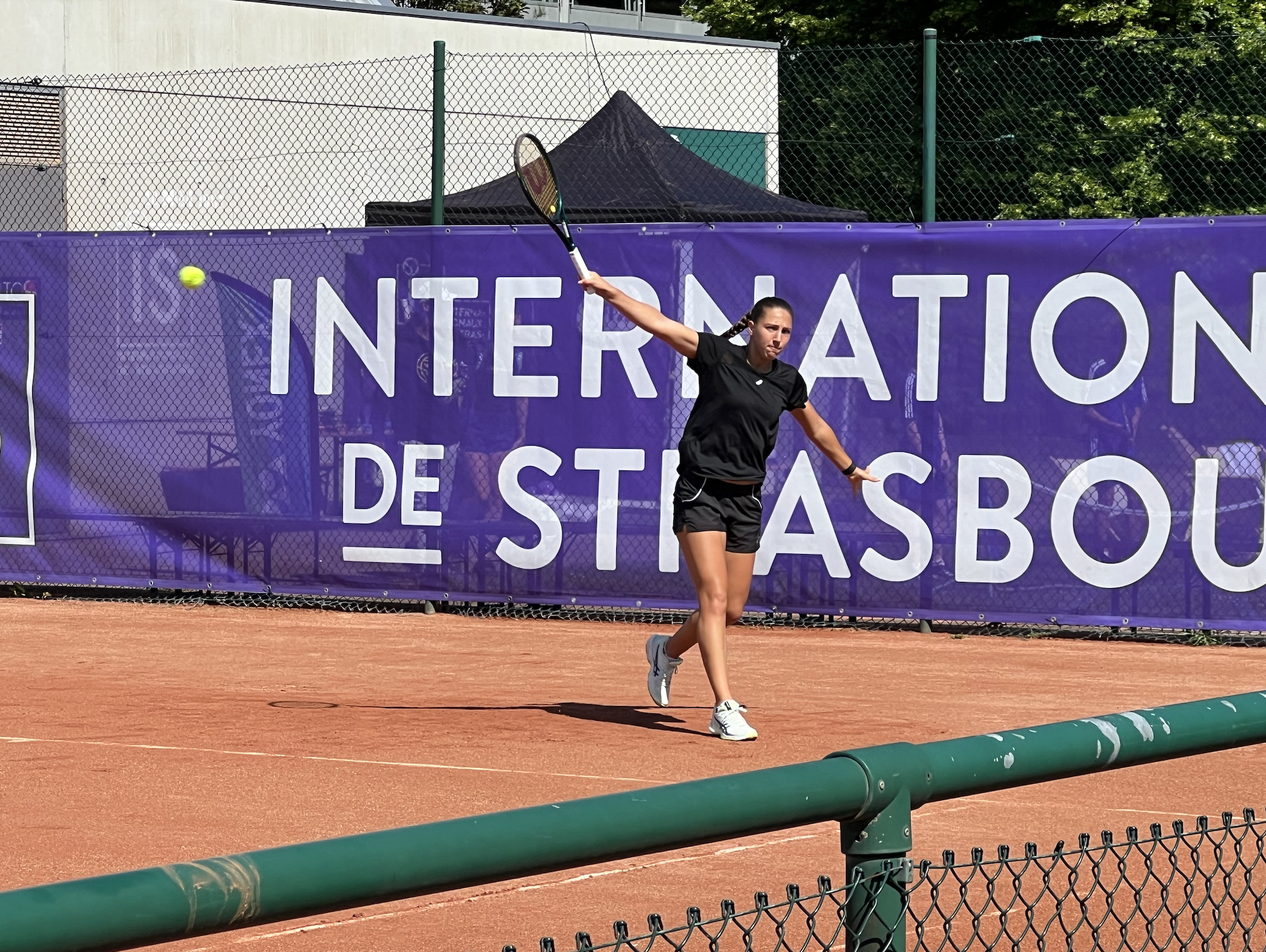
Parry practicing her backhand in Strasbourg in 2024

=== 2025: Major third rounds ===
In July, Parry qualified for the Wimbledon main-draw and defeated Petra Martić and 12th seed Diana Shnaider to reach the third round, at which point she lost to Sonay Kartal.

At the US Open, she made it through to the third round at this major for the first time by defeating Petra Kvitová, in the final match of the two-time Wimbledon champion's career, and Renata Zarazúa, before losing to 27th seed Marta Kostyuk in three sets.

=== 2026: First WTA singles title, top 30 ===
Parry reached her first tour semifinal in two years at the Ostrava Open, recording wins over fellow French player Océane Dodin, eighth seed Panna Udvardy and Nikola Bartůňková. She lost to Tamara Korpatsch in the last four.

She won her third WTA 125 singles title at the Trophée Clarins when her opponent in the final, top seed Madison Keys, retired due to a thigh injury in the second set. It was the second time Parry had won this tournament, having previously been champion in 2023, and as a result she re-entered the top 100 at world No. 94, on 18 May 2026.

At the French Open, Parry defeated Anhelina Kalinina, 30th seed Ann Li and sixth seed Amanda Anisimova to reach the fourth round of a major event for the first time. It was her second-best win, behind her triumph over then world No.2 Barbora Krejcikova in 2022, also at Roland Garros. Her run was ended by qualifier and eventual finalist Maja Chwalińska but despite the loss she became the French No. 1 singles player on 8 June 2026. At the Berlin Open, she reached the round of 16 as a qualifier, but fell to eventual champion, Linda Nosková. Despite her defeat, she broke into the WTA top 50 in singles at world No. 47, on 22 June 2026. At Wimbledon, Parry made it into the second round, where she lost to 19th seed Anna Kalinskaya in a third set tiebreak.

In August at the WTA 1000 Cincinnati Open, she reached the fourth round, at which point her run was ended by seventh seed Iga Świątek. The following week at the Monterrey Open, Parry won her first career singles title, defeating second seed Elise Mertens in the final, having recorded wins over sixth seed Donna Vekić, Oleksandra Oliynykova, Clara Tauson and fifth seed Ann Li en route to the championship match. As a result, she reached a new career-high of world No. 31, on 31 August 2026, and later the top 30 on 14 September 2026. At the US Open, Parry defeated Viktorija Golubic, before losing to 16th seed Sorana Cîrstea in the second round.

== Performance timelines ==
Key
W	F	SF	QF	#R	RR	Q#	DNQ	A	NH

(W) winner; (F) finalist; (SF) semifinalist; (QF) quarterfinalist; (#R) rounds 4, 3, 2, 1; (RR) round-robin stage; (Q#) qualification round; (DNQ) did not qualify; (A) absent; (NH) not held; (SR) strike rate (events won / competed); (W–L) win–loss record.
To avoid confusion and double counting, these charts are updated at the conclusion of a tournament or when the player's participation has ended.

Only main-draw results in WTA Tour, Grand Slam tournaments, Billie Jean King Cup, United Cup, Hopman Cup and Olympic Games are included in win–loss records.

=== Singles ===
Current through the 2026 US Open.

Tournament	2018	2019	2020	2021	2022	2023	2024	2025	2026	SR	W–L	Win%
Grand Slam tournaments
Australian Open	A	A	Q1	A	1R	1R	3R	1R	Q1	0 / 4	2–4	33%
French Open	Q2	2R	1R	1R	3R	2R	2R	1R	4R	0 / 8	8–8	50%
Wimbledon	A	A	NH	A	3R	2R	1R	3R	2R	0 / 5	6–5	55%
US Open	A	1R	A	A	1R	1R	2R	3R	2R	0 / 6	4–6	40%
Win–Loss	0–0	1–2	0–1	0–1	4–4	2–4	4–4	4–4	5–3	0 / 23	20–23	47%
National representation
Summer Olympics	Not held			A	Not held		2R	Not held		0 / 1	1–1	50%
Billie Jean King Cup (Note: Formerly known as Fed Cup until 2020.)	A	A	A (Note: Edition is split into the two years due to COVID-19.)		QR	A				0 / 0	1–0	100%
WTA 1000 tournaments
Qatar Open	A	NTI	A	NTI	Q1	NTI	Q1	A	A	0 / 0	0–0	–
Dubai Championships	NTI	A	NTI	A	NTI	A	A	A	A	0 / 0	0–0	–
Indian Wells Open	A	A	NH	A	Q1	Q1	4R	A	2R	0 / 2	4–2	67%
Miami Open	A	A	NH	A	Q1	A	2R	A	Q2	0 / 1	1–1	50%
Madrid Open	A	A	NH	A	Q1	Q1	A	2R	Q1	0 / 1	1–1	50%
Italian Open	A	A	A	A	A	A	1R	A	Q1	0 / 1	0–1	–
Canadian Open	A	A	NH	A	A	A	A	A	1R	0 / 1	0–1	0%
Cincinnati Open	A	A	A	A	Q1	Q2	A	A	4R	0 / 1	3–1	75%
China Open	A	A	NH			Q1	2R	Q2	2R	0 / 2	1–2	33%
Wuhan Open	A	A	NH				1R	Q1	1R	0 / 2	0–2	0%
Win–Loss	0–0	0–0	0–0	0–0	0–0	0–0	5–5	1–1	4–5	0 / 11	10–11	48%
Career statistics
	2018	2019	2020	2021	2022	2023	2024	2025	2026	SR	W–L	Win%
Tournaments	0	2	1	2	13	9				Career total: 27		
Titles	0	0	0	0	0	0	0	0	0	Career total: 0		
Finals	0	0	0	0	0	0	0	0	0	Career total: 0		
Hard win–loss	0–0	0–1	0–0	0–0	8–8	0–5				0 / 14	8–14	36%
Clay win–loss	0–0	1–1	0–1	0–2	4–4	5–3				0 / 11	10–11	48%
Grass win–loss	0–0	0–0	0–0	0–0	2–1	1–1				0 / 2	3–2	60%
Overall win–loss	0–0	1–2	0–1	0–2	14–13	6–9				0 / 27	21–27	44%
Year-end ranking	739	331	305	141	76	105	50	127		$4,516,733		

=== Doubles ===
Current through the 2024 US Open.

Tournament	2017	2018	2019	2020	2021	2022	2023	2024	2025	SR	W–L	Win%
Grand Slam tournaments
Australian Open	A	A	A	A	A	1R	A	1R	2R	0 / 3	1–3	25%
French Open	1R	1R	3R	1R	1R	A (Note: Planned for playing alongside Alizé Cornet but they withdrew at the last minute. As a result, no alternatives were chosen.)	3R	1R	3R	0 / 8	6–8	43%
Wimbledon	A	A	A	NH	A	2R	A	2R	A	0 / 2	2–2	50%
US Open	A	A	A	A	A	A	1R	3R	A	0 / 2	2–2	50%
Win–Loss	0–1	0–1	2–1	0–1	0–1	1–2	2–2	3–4	3–2	0 / 15	11–15	42%
National representation
Billie Jean King Cup	A	A	A	A		QR	A			0 / 0	1–0	100%
Career statistics
Tournaments	1	1	2	2	2	5	6	1		Career total: 20		
Titles	0	0	0	0	0	0	2			Career total: 2		
Finals	0	0	0	0	0	0	2			Career total: 2		
Overall win–loss	0–1	0–1	2–2	0–2	0–2	4–5	10–4	0–1		1 / 20	16–18	47%
Year-end ranking	863	751	277	285	360	383	83	99				

== WTA Tour finals ==
=== Singles: 1 (title) ===
Legend WTA 500 (1–0)	Finals by surface Hard (1–0)	Finals by setting Outdoor (1–0)

Result	Date	Tournament	Tier	Surface	Opponent	Score
Win	Aug 2026	Monterrey Open, Mexico	WTA 500	Hard	(Belgium) Elise Mertens	6–4, 0–6, 6–3

=== Doubles: 3 (2 titles, 1 runner-up) ===
Legend WTA 250 (2–1)	Finals by surface Hard (1–0) Clay (1–0) Grass (0–1)

Result	W–L	Date	Tournament	Tier	Surface	Partner	Opponents	Score
Win	1–0	Feb 2023	Mérida Open, Mexico	WTA 250	Hard	(United States) Caty McNally	(China) Wang Xinyu (Chinese Taipei) Wu Fang-hsien	6–0, 7–5
Win	2–0	Jul 2023	Ladies Open Lausanne, Switzerland	WTA 250	Clay	(Hungary) Anna Bondár	(Russia) Amina Anshba (Czech Republic) Anastasia Dețiuc	6–2, 6–1
Loss	2–1	Jun 2024	Nottingham Open, United Kingdom	WTA 250	Grass	(United Kingdom) Harriet Dart	(Canada) Gabriela Dabrowski (New Zealand) Erin Routliffe	7–5, 3–6, [9–11]

== WTA 125 finals ==
=== Singles: 6 (3 titles, 3 runner-ups) ===
Result	W–L	Date	Tournament	Surface	Opponent	Score
Loss	0–1	Nov 2021	Buenos Aires Open, Argentina	Clay	(Hungary) Anna Bondár	3–6, 3–6
Win	1–1	Nov 2021	Montevideo Open, Uruguay	Clay	(Hungary) Panna Udvardy	6–3, 6–2
Win	2–1	May 2023	Clarins Open, France	Clay	(United States) Caty McNally	w/o
Loss	2–2	Nov 2023	Colina Challenger, Chile	Clay	(Czech Republic) Sára Bejlek	2–6, 1–6
Loss	2–3	Dec 2023	Montevideo Open, Uruguay	Clay	(Mexico) Renata Zarazúa	5–7, 6–3, 4–6
Win	3–3	May 2026	Clarins Open, France (2)	Clay	(United States) Madison Keys	3–6, 3–3 ret.

== ITF Circuit finals ==
=== Singles: 5 (4 titles, 1 runner-up) ===
Legend
$40,000 tournaments (0–1)
$25,000 tournaments (3–0)
$15,000 tournaments (1–0)

Result	W–L	Date	Tournament	Tier	Surface	Opponent	Score
Win	1–0	Dec 2020	ITF Antalya, Turkey	15,000	Clay	(Turkey) Berfu Cengiz	6–3, 6–1
Win	2–0	Jun 2021	ITF Périgueux, France	25,000	Clay	(France) Elsa Jacquemot	6–3, 6–1
Win	3–0	Jul 2021	ITF Turin, Italy	25,000	Clay	(Italy) Lucia Bronzetti	6–4, 6–2
Win	4–0	Oct 2021	ITF Seville, Spain	25,000	Clay	(Russia) Elina Avanesyan	6–2, 6–0
Loss	4–1	Oct 2023	ITF Heraklion, Greece	40,000	Clay	(Austria) Sinja Kraus	2–6, 6–4, 4–6

=== Doubles: 4 (4 titles) ===
Legend
W80 tournaments (1–0)
W25 tournaments (1–0)
W15 tournaments (2–0)

Result	W–L	Date	Tournament	Tier	Surface	Partner	Opponents	Score
Win	1–0	Oct 2017	ITF Hammamet, Tunisia	15k	Clay	(France) Yasmine Mansouri	(Netherlands) Dominique Karregat (France) Caroline Roméo	6–1, 6–1
Win	2–0	Aug 2020	ITF Oeiras, Portugal	W15	Clay	(Spain) Eva Guerrero Álvarez	(Portugal) Francisca Jorge (Spain) Olga Parres Azcoitia	7–6, 6–0
Win	3–0	Jun 2021	ITF Périgueux, France	W250	Clay	(France) Margot Yerolymos	(Burundi) Sada Nahimana (Czech Republic) Anna Sisková	6–4, 6–2
Win	4–0	Apr 2023	Zaragoza Open, Spain	W80	Clay	(Netherlands) Arantxa Rus	(United States) Asia Muhammad (United Kingdom) Eden Silva	6–1, 4–6, [10–5]

== Wins against top 10 players ==
- She has a 1–2 record against players who were, at the time the match was played, ranked in the top 10.

No.	Player	Rk	Event	Surface	Rd	Score	Rk	Years	Ref
1	(Czech Republic) Barbora Krejčíková	2	French Open, France	Clay	1R	1–6, 6–2, 6–3	97	2022	

- Key: (Rk) first use, opponent rank; (Rd) round; (Rk) 2nd use, player rank; (Ref) reference; (F) final; (SF) semifinal; (QF) quarterfinal; (#R) rounds 4, 3, 2, 1; (RR) round-robin stage; (Q#) qualifying rounds or stages (3), 2, 1.

== Notes ==
Awards
Preceded by (France) Clara Burel	ITF Junior World Champion; 2019	Succeeded by (Croatia) Petra Marčinko (2021)
