= 2024 Birmingham Classic – Doubles =

Doubles
- 2024 Birmingham Classic

Final
- Champions: (Chinese Taipei) Hsieh Su-wei (Belgium) Elise Mertens
- Runners-up: (Japan) Miyu Kato (China) Zhang Shuai
- Score: 6–1, 6–3

Events
Singles	Doubles
← 2023 ·	Birmingham Classic	· 2025 →

Hsieh Su-wei and Elise Mertens won the doubles title at the 2024 Birmingham Classic, defeating Miyu Kato and Zhang Shuai in the final, 6–1, 6–3.

Marta Kostyuk and Barbora Krejčíková were the reigning champions, but Kostyuk did not participate this year. Krejčíková partnered Diana Shnaider but lost in the first round to Anastasia Potapova and Yulia Putintseva.

== Seeds ==
1. (Chinese Taipei) Hsieh Su-wei / (Belgium) Elise Mertens (champions)
2. (Canada) Gabriela Dabrowski / (New Zealand) Erin Routliffe (first round)
3. (Czech Republic) Marie Bouzková / (Spain) Sara Sorribes Tormo (semifinals)
4. (United States) Asia Muhammad / (Indonesia) Aldila Sutjiadi (semifinals)

== Draw ==
=== Key ===
- Q = Qualifier
- WC = Wild card
- LL = Lucky loser
- Alt = Alternate
- ITF = ITF entry
- PR = Protected ranking
- SR = Special ranking
- SE = Special exempt
- JE = Junior exempt
- JR = Junior Accelerator Programme entrant
- CO = College Accelerator Programme entrant
- NG = Next Gen Accelerator Program entrant
- w/o = Walkover
- r = Retired
- d = Defaulted

=== Draw ===
First round
1	(Chinese Taipei) S-w Hsieh (Belgium) E Mertens	6	6
WC	(United Kingdom) A Barnett (United Kingdom) F Christie	1	1
(Romania) S Cirstea (Australia) A Tomljanović	4	1
WC	(United Kingdom) S Murray Sharan (United Kingdom) E Silva	6	6
4	(United States) A Muhammad (Indonesia) A Sutjiadi	5	6	[10]
(China) H Guo (China) X Jiang	7	4	[3]
(Slovakia) T Mihalíková (United Kingdom) O Nicholls	7^{7}	6
(Georgia (country)) O Kalashnikova; Y Sizikova	6^{4}	2
(Czech Republic) B Krejčíková; D Shnaider	6	1	[7]
A Potapova (Kazakhstan) Y Putintseva	3	6	[10]
(United Kingdom) H Dart (United Kingdom) M Lumsden	5	5
3	(Czech Republic) M Bouzková (Spain) S Sorribes Tormo	7	7
(Japan) M Kato (China) S Zhang	6	6
(United Kingdom) SB Grey (United Kingdom) T Moore	2	3
(Belgium) G Minnen (United Kingdom) H Watson	6	6
2	(Canada) G Dabrowski (New Zealand) E Routliffe	3	2

Quarterfinals
1	(Chinese Taipei) S-w Hsieh (Belgium) E Mertens	6	6
WC	(United Kingdom) S Murray Sharan (United Kingdom) E Silva	0	4
4	(United States) A Muhammad (Indonesia) A Sutjiadi	3	6	[10]
(Slovakia) T Mihalíková (United Kingdom) O Nicholls	6	3	[6]
A Potapova (Kazakhstan) Y Putintseva	2	2
3	(Czech Republic) M Bouzková (Spain) S Sorribes Tormo	6	6
(Japan) M Kato (China) S Zhang	w/o
(Belgium) G Minnen (United Kingdom) H Watson

Semifinals
1	(Chinese Taipei) S-w Hsieh (Belgium) E Mertens	6	6
4	(United States) A Muhammad (Indonesia) A Sutjiadi	1	2
3	(Czech Republic) M Bouzková (Spain) S Sorribes Tormo	3	2
(Japan) M Kato (China) S Zhang	6	6

Final
1	(Chinese Taipei) S-w Hsieh (Belgium) E Mertens	6	6
(Japan) M Kato (China) S Zhang	1	3
