= 2024 Hong Kong 125 Open – Doubles =

Doubles
- 2024 Hong Kong 125 Open

Final
- Champions: (Romania) Monica Niculescu (Romania) Elena-Gabriela Ruse
- Runners-up: (Japan) Nao Hibino (Japan) Makoto Ninomiya
- Score: 6–3, 5–7, [10–5]

Events
Singles	Doubles
Hong Kong 125 Open	· 2025 →

This was the first edition of the tournament.

Monica Niculescu and Elena-Gabriela Ruse won the title, defeating Nao Hibino and Makoto Ninomiya in the final, 6–3, 5–7, [10–5].

== Seeds ==
1. (Norway) Ulrikke Eikeri / (Chinese Taipei) Wu Fang-hsien (semifinals)
2. (Japan) Shuko Aoyama / (Japan) Eri Hozumi (semifinals)

== Draw ==
=== Key ===
- Q = Qualifier
- WC = Wild card
- LL = Lucky loser
- Alt = Alternate
- SE = Special exempt
- PR = Protected ranking
- ITF = ITF entry
- JE = Junior exempt
- w/o = Walkover
- r = Retired
- d = Defaulted
- SR = Special ranking

=== Draw ===
Quarterfinals
1	(Norway) U Eikeri (Chinese Taipei) F-h Wu	6	6
WC	(Hong Kong) E Chong (Hong Kong) C Wong	3	2
(Romania) M Niculescu (Romania) E-G Ruse	7	6
(Australia) K Birrell (Chinese Taipei) S-w Hsieh	5	2
(Thailand) P Plipuech (China) W Zheng	0	1
(Japan) N Hibino (Japan) M Ninomiya	6	6
(United States) J Aney (Germany) L Papadakis	4	3
2	(Japan) S Aoyama (Japan) E Hozumi	6	6

Semifinals
1	(Norway) U Eikeri (Chinese Taipei) F-h Wu	2	7^{7}	[4]
(Romania) M Niculescu (Romania) E-G Ruse	6	6^{2}	[10]
(Japan) N Hibino (Japan) M Ninomiya	7	6
2	(Japan) S Aoyama (Japan) E Hozumi	5	1

Final
(Romania) M Niculescu (Romania) E-G Ruse	6	5	[10]
(Japan) N Hibino (Japan) M Ninomiya	3	7	[5]
