= 2025 Birmingham Open – Women's singles =

Women's singles
- 2025 Birmingham Open

Final
- Champion: (Belgium) Greet Minnen
- Runner-up: (Czech Republic) Linda Fruhvirtová
- Score: 6–2, 6–1

Events
Singles	men	women
Doubles	men	women
- Birmingham Open

Greet Minnen won the women's singles title at the 2025 Birmingham Open, defeating Linda Fruhvirtová in the final, 6–2, 6–1.

Yulia Putintseva was the defending champion from when the event was last held as a WTA 250 tournament, but did not participate this year.

== Seeds ==
1. (United States) Alycia Parks (first round)
2. (Australia) Kimberly Birrell (quarterfinals)
3. (Philippines) Alexandra Eala (first round)
4. (Turkey) Zeynep Sönmez (second round)
5. (Belgium) Greet Minnen (champion)
6. (Switzerland) Viktorija Golubic (second round)
7. (Germany) Tatjana Maria (first round)
8. (Australia) Olivia Gadecki (first round)

== Draw ==
Key

- Q = Qualifier
- WC = Wild card
- LL = Lucky loser
- Alt = Alternate
- ITF = ITF entry
- PR = Protected ranking
- SR = Special ranking
- SE = Special exempt
- JE = Junior exempt
- JR = Junior Accelerator Programme entrant
- CO = College Accelerator Programme entrant
- NG = Next Gen Accelerator Program entrant
- w/o = Walkover
- r = Retired
- d = Defaulted

=== Finals ===
Semifinals
(France) Jessika Ponchet	2	6	4
(Czech Republic) Linda Fruhvirtová	6	0	6
(Switzerland) Rebeka Masarova	6	6^{7}	6^{5}
5	(Belgium) Greet Minnen	3	7^{9}	7^{7}

Final
(Czech Republic) Linda Fruhvirtová	2	1
5	(Belgium) Greet Minnen	6	6

=== Top half ===
First round
1	(United States) A Parks	2	6^{6}
WC	(United Kingdom) M Xu	6	7^{8}
E Andreeva	5	4
(Poland) K Kawa	7	6
(France) J Ponchet	6	6
Q	V Diatchenko	3	2
WC	(United Kingdom) H Watson	6	6
8	(Australia) O Gadecki	0	3
3	(Philippines) A Eala	5	7^{7}	1
(Czech Republic) L Fruhvirtová	7	6^{5}	6
(Croatia) J Fett	3	4
WC	(United Kingdom) J Burrage	6	6
WC	(United Kingdom) A Banks	2	4
(Italy) L Stefanini	6	6
Q	(Switzerland) V Ryser	7^{7}	7
7	(Germany) T Maria	6^{2}	5

Second round
WC	(United Kingdom) M Xu	4	7	6
(Poland) K Kawa	6	5	2
(France) J Ponchet	6	5	7
WC	(United Kingdom) H Watson	4	7	5
(Czech Republic) L Fruhvirtová	6	6
WC	(United Kingdom) J Burrage	0	4
(Italy) L Stefanini	6	7^{7}
Q	(Switzerland) V Ryser	3	6^{4}

Quarterfinals
WC	(United Kingdom) M Xu	2	4
(France) J Ponchet	6	6
(Czech Republic) L Fruhvirtová	6	6
(Italy) L Stefanini	4	3

Semifinals
(France) J Ponchet	2	6	4
(Czech Republic) L Fruhvirtová	6	0	6

=== Bottom half ===
First round
6	(Switzerland) V Golubic	6	6
Q	(France) H Tan	2	3
(Ukraine) D Snigur	6	2	4
(Switzerland) R Masarova	3	6	6
(United States) R Montgomery	6	2	7^{7}
(Australia) T Gibson	4	6	6^{1}
Q	(Australia) L Cabrera	3	5
4	(Turkey) Z Sönmez	6	7
5	(Belgium) G Minnen	6	6
LL	(Netherlands) A Hartono	4	2
(Canada) R Marino	6	4	1
Q	(Czech Republic) T Martincová	3	6	6
Q	(Japan) S Ishii	3	4
LL	(China) S Wei	6	6
(Australia) M Inglis	1	4
2	(Australia) K Birrell	6	6

Second round
6	(Switzerland) V Golubic	2	6^{1}
(Switzerland) R Masarova	6	7^{7}
(United States) R Montgomery	7^{8}	4	6
4	(Turkey) Z Sönmez	6^{6}	6	4
5	(Belgium) G Minnen	3	7^{7}	6
Q	(Czech Republic) T Martincová	6	6^{5}	3
LL	(China) S Wei	5	2
2	(Australia) K Birrell	7	6

Quarterfinals
(Switzerland) R Masarova	6	0
(United States) R Montgomery	2	0^{r}
5	(Belgium) G Minnen	6	5	6
2	(Australia) K Birrell	3	7	3

Semifinals
(Switzerland) R Masarova	6	6^{7}	6^{5}
5	(Belgium) G Minnen	3	7^{9}	7^{7}

== Qualifying ==
=== Seeds ===
1. (China) Wei Sijia (qualifying competition, lucky loser)
2. (Australia) Destanee Aiava (first round)
3. (United States) Whitney Osuigwe (first round)
4. (Japan) Sara Saito (first round)
5. (France) Manon Léonard (first round)
6. (Netherlands) Arianne Hartono (qualifying competition, lucky loser)
7. (Japan) Kyōka Okamura (first round)
8. (Switzerland) Céline Naef (first round)
9. (Georgia (country)) Mariam Bolkvadze (qualifying competition)
10. (Canada) Carson Branstine (first round)
11. (Japan) Sayaka Ishii (qualified)
12. (Australia) Lizette Cabrera (qualified)

=== Qualifiers ===
1. (Australia) Lizette Cabrera
2. (Switzerland) Valentina Ryser
3. (Czech Republic) Tereza Martincová
4. Vitalia Diatchenko
5. (France) Harmony Tan
6. (Japan) Sayaka Ishii

=== Lucky losers ===
1. (China) Wei Sijia
2. (Netherlands) Arianne Hartono

=== Qualifying draw ===
==== First qualifier ====
First round
1	(China) Wei Sijia	6	6
(Canada) Kayla Cross	4	3
(United Kingdom) Emily Appleton	6	0	3
12	(Australia) Lizette Cabrera	0	6	6

Qualifying competition
1	(China) Wei Sijia	4	6	6^{5}
12	(Australia) Lizette Cabrera	6	3	7^{7}

==== Second qualifier ====
First round
2	(Australia) Destanee Aiava	3	5
(Switzerland) Valentina Ryser	6	7
(United Kingdom) Lily Miyazaki	6	5	6
8	(Switzerland) Céline Naef	4	7	2

Qualifying competition
(Switzerland) Valentina Ryser	6	7
(United Kingdom) Lily Miyazaki	3	5

==== Third qualifier ====
First round
3	(United States) Whitney Osuigwe	5	6^{5}
(United Kingdom) Ella McDonald	7	7^{7}
(Czech Republic) Tereza Martincová	6	6
7	(Japan) Kyōka Okamura	1	1

Qualifying competition
(United Kingdom) Ella McDonald	1	1
(Czech Republic) Tereza Martincová	6	6

==== Fourth qualifier ====
First round
4	(Japan) Sara Saito	3	6^{5}
WC	(United Kingdom) Ranah Stoiber	6	7^{7}
Vitalia Diatchenko	6^{5}	6	6
10	(Canada) Carson Branstine	7^{7}	3	3

Qualifying competition
WC	(United Kingdom) Ranah Stoiber	6^{4}	3
Vitalia Diatchenko	7^{7}	6

==== Fifth qualifier ====
First round
5	(France) Manon Léonard	1	6	4
(France) Harmony Tan	6	1	6
WC	(United Kingdom) Tegan Bush	5	7^{7}	0
9	(Georgia (country)) Mariam Bolkvadze	7	6^{5}	6

Qualifying competition
(France) Harmony Tan	6	7^{7}
9	(Georgia (country)) Mariam Bolkvadze	0	6^{4}

==== Sixth qualifier ====
First round
6	(Netherlands) Arianne Hartono	6	7^{7}
WC	(United Kingdom) Naiktha Bains	0	6^{3}
WC	(United Kingdom) Amelia Rajecki	4	4
11	(Japan) Sayaka Ishii	6	6

Qualifying competition
6	(Netherlands) Arianne Hartono	6	6^{3}	3
11	(Japan) Sayaka Ishii	3	7^{7}	6
