= 2024 Hong Kong 125 Open =

- Date: 30 September–6 October
- Edition: 1st
- Category: WTA 125
- Draw: 32S / 8D
- Surface: Hard
- Location: Hong Kong, China
- Venue: Victoria Park Tennis Stadium

Champions

Singles
- (Australia) Ajla Tomljanović

Doubles
- (Romania) Monica Niculescu / (Romania) Elena-Gabriela Ruse
Hong Kong 125 Open	· 2025 →

The 2024 Hong Kong 125 Open (also known as the Prudential Hong Kong Tennis 125 for sponsorship reasons) was a professional tennis tournament which was played on outdoor hardcourts. It was the first edition of the tournament and part of the 2024 WTA 125 tournaments. It took place in Hong Kong, China, from 30 September to 6 October 2024.

== Champions ==
=== Singles ===
- (Australia) Ajla Tomljanović def. (Denmark) Clara Tauson, 4–6, 6–4, 6–4.

=== Doubles ===
- (Romania) Monica Niculescu / (Romania) Elena-Gabriela Ruse def. (Japan) Nao Hibino / (Japan) Makoto Ninomiya, 6–3, 5–7, [10–5].

== Singles main draw entrants ==
=== Seeds ===
Country	Player	Rank¹	Seed
USA	Emma Navarro	8	1
FRA	Clara Burel	56	2
~~USA~~	~~Katie Volynets~~	~~60~~	~~3~~
FRA	Varvara Gracheva	62	4
USA	McCartney Kessler	65	5
DEN	Clara Tauson	72	6
	Anna Blinkova	78	7
HUN	Anna Bondár	90	8

¹ Rankings are as of 23 September 2024.

=== Other entrants ===
The following players received wildcards into the singles main draw:

- (Hong Kong) Eudice Chong
- (Romania) Simona Halep
- (United States) Emma Navarro
- (Hong Kong) Cody Wong

The following player received entry using a protected ranking:

- (China) Wang Qiang

The following players received entry from the qualifying draw:

- (United States) Varvara Lepchenko
- (China) Ma Yexin
- (Thailand) Peangtarn Plipuech
- (China) Yang Yidi

The following player received entry as a lucky loser:

- (United States) Jessie Aney

== Doubles main draw entrants ==
=== Seeds ===
Country	Player	Country	Player	Rank^{1}	Seed
NOR	Ulrikke Eikeri	TPE	Wu Fang-hsien		1
JPN	Shuko Aoyama	JPN	Eri Hozumi		2

¹ Rankings are as of 23 September 2024.

=== Other entrants ===
The following pair received a wildcard into the doubles main draw:

- (Hong Kong) Eudice Chong / (Hong Kong) Cody Wong
