= 2025 Birmingham Open – Women's doubles =

Women's doubles
- 2025 Birmingham Open

Final
- Champions: (Australia) Destanee Aiava (Spain) Cristina Bucșa
- Runners-up: (United Kingdom) Alicia Barnett (France) Elixane Lechemia
- Score: 6–4, 6–2

Events
Singles	men	women
Doubles	men	women
← 2024 ·	Birmingham Open	· 2026 →

Destanee Aiava and Cristina Bucșa won the women's doubles title at the 2025 Birmingham Open, defeating Alicia Barnett and Elixane Lechemia in the final, 6–4, 6–2.

Hsieh Su-wei and Elise Mertens were the reigning champions, but did not participate this year.

== Seeds ==
1. (Ukraine) Nadiia Kichenok / (China) Xu Yifan (first round)
2. (Australia) Storm Hunter / (Australia) Ellen Perez (semifinals)
3. (Japan) Makoto Ninomiya / (China) Tang Qianhui (quarterfinals)
4. (United Kingdom) Emily Appleton / (United Kingdom) Heather Watson (first round)

== Draw ==
=== Key ===
- Q = Qualifier
- WC = Wild card
- LL = Lucky loser
- Alt = Alternate
- ITF = ITF entry
- PR = Protected ranking
- SR = Special ranking
- SE = Special exempt
- JE = Junior exempt
- JR = Junior Accelerator Programme entrant
- CO = College Accelerator Programme entrant
- NG = Next Gen Accelerator Program entrant
- w/o = Walkover
- r = Retired
- d = Defaulted

=== Draw ===
First round
1	(Ukraine) N Kichenok (China) Y Xu	6	1	[6]
(United Kingdom) A Barnett (France) E Lechemia	4	6	[10]
(Switzerland) V Golubic (Belgium) G Minnen	6	0	[10]
WC	(United Kingdom) A Rajecki (United Kingdom) M Xu	2	6	[5]
3	(Japan) M Ninomiya (China) Q Tang	6	7^{7}
(United States) W Osuigwe (United States) A Smith	2	6^{4}
(United Kingdom) M Brooks (Australia) P Hule	4	4
(Belgium) M Kempen (France) J Ponchet	6	6
(Australia) K Birrell (Australia) T Gibson	6	6
(Algeria) I Ibbou (Switzerland) N Karamoko	0	3
(Australia) D Aiava (Spain) C Bucșa	7	7
4	(United Kingdom) E Appleton (United Kingdom) H Watson	5	5
(United States) C Corley (United States) I Corley	2	6	[3]
(United Kingdom) J Burrage (Australia) O Gadecki	6	3	[10]
(Philippines) A Eala (Switzerland) R Masarova	4	4
2	(Australia) S Hunter (Australia) E Perez	6	6

Quarterfinals
(United Kingdom) A Barnett (France) E Lechemia	6	6
(Switzerland) V Golubic (Belgium) G Minnen	3	4
3	(Japan) M Ninomiya (China) Q Tang	6^{5}	6	[7]
(Belgium) M Kempen (France) J Ponchet	7^{7}	4	[10]
(Australia) K Birrell (Australia) T Gibson	6^{6}	6^{2}
(Australia) D Aiava (Spain) C Bucșa	7^{8}	7^{7}
(United Kingdom) J Burrage (Australia) O Gadecki	6	6^{5}	[7]
2	(Australia) S Hunter (Australia) E Perez	1	7^{7}	[10]

Semifinals
(United Kingdom) A Barnett (France) E Lechemia	6^{2}	6	[10]
(Belgium) M Kempen (France) J Ponchet	7^{7}	4	[7]
(Australia) D Aiava (Spain) C Bucșa	2	6	[12]
2	(Australia) S Hunter (Australia) E Perez	6	4	[10]

Final
(United Kingdom) A Barnett (France) E Lechemia	4	2
(Australia) D Aiava (Spain) C Bucșa	6	6
