= 2024 Hong Kong 125 Open – Singles =

Singles
- 2024 Hong Kong 125 Open

Final
- Champion: (Australia) Ajla Tomljanović
- Runner-up: (Denmark) Clara Tauson
- Score: 4–6, 6–4, 6–4

Events
Singles	Doubles
Hong Kong 125 Open	· 2025 →

This was the first edition of the tournament.

Ajla Tomljanović won the title, defeating Clara Tauson in the final, 4–6, 6–4, 6–4.

== Seeds ==
1. (United States) Emma Navarro (quarterfinals)
2. (France) Clara Burel (first round)
3. (United States) Katie Volynets (withdrew)
4. (France) Varvara Gracheva (semifinals)
5. (United States) McCartney Kessler (quarterfinals, retired)
6. (Denmark) Clara Tauson (final)
7. Anna Blinkova (semifinals)
8. (Hungary) Anna Bondár (second round)

== Draw ==
=== Key ===
- Q = Qualifier
- WC = Wild card
- LL = Lucky loser
- Alt = Alternate
- SE = Special exempt
- PR = Protected ranking
- ITF = ITF entry
- JE = Junior exempt
- w/o = Walkover
- r = Retired
- d = Defaulted
- SR = Special ranking

=== Finals ===
Semifinals
7	Anna Blinkova	4	6	3
(Australia) Ajla Tomljanović	6	2	6
4	(France) Varvara Gracheva	4	3
6	(Denmark) Clara Tauson	6	6

Final
(Australia) Ajla Tomljanović	4	6	6
6	(Denmark) Clara Tauson	6	4	4

=== Top half ===
First round
1/WC	(United States) E Navarro	7	6
(Switzerland) V Golubic	5	4
(Australia) K Birrell	6	6
Q	(China) Y Yang	2	0
WC	(Romania) S Halep	6	4	6
(Australia) Ar Rodionova	2	6	4
Q	(Thailand) P Plipuech	1	2
7	A Blinkova	6	6
Alt	(Romania) E-G Ruse	6	6
PR	(China) Q Wang	0	4
(Australia) A Tomljanović	6	5	6
(Canada) M Stakusic	4	7	0
Alt	(Thailand) M Sawangkaew	5	6	6
(United States) A Parks	7	3	4
WC	(Hong Kong) E Chong	3	4
5	(United States) M Kessler	6	6

Second round
1/WC	(United States) E Navarro	6	6
(Australia) K Birrell	2	4
WC	(Romania) S Halep	2	1
7	A Blinkova	6	6
Alt	(Romania) E-G Ruse	5	3
(Australia) A Tomljanović	7	6
Alt	(Thailand) M Sawangkaew	3	2
5	(United States) M Kessler	6	6

Quarterfinals
1/WC	(United States) E Navarro	4	3
7	A Blinkova	6	6
(Australia) A Tomljanović	6	0
5	(United States) M Kessler	3	0^{r}

Semifinals
7	A Blinkova	4	6	3
(Australia) A Tomljanović	6	2	6

=== Bottom half ===
First round
8	(Hungary) A Bondár	6	6
WC	(Hong Kong) C Wong	4	4
(Netherlands) A Hartono	4	6	4
(Netherlands) S Lamens	6	1	6
(Spain) S Sorribes Tormo	5	1
(United States) H Baptiste	7	6
Q	(China) Y Ma	6	1	2
4	(France) V Gracheva	0	6	6
6	(Denmark) C Tauson	6	7
(Italy) M Trevisan	3	5
(Czech Republic) L Fruhvirtová	3	6	5
Q	(United States) V Lepchenko	6	3	7
LL	(United States) J Aney	1	4
(Hungary) D Gálfi	6	6
Alt	(Japan) N Hibino	6	7^{7}
2	(France) C Burel	2	6^{5}

Second round
8	(Hungary) A Bondár	6	5	1
(Netherlands) S Lamens	3	7	6
(United States) H Baptiste	3	3
4	(France) V Gracheva	6	6
6	(Denmark) C Tauson	2	6	6
Q	(United States) V Lepchenko	6	3	4
(Hungary) D Gálfi	4	6	3
Alt	(Japan) N Hibino	6	3	6

Quarterfinals
(Netherlands) S Lamens	6	6^{5}	4
4	(France) V Gracheva	4	7^{7}	6
6	(Denmark) C Tauson	6	6
Alt	(Japan) N Hibino	1	1

Semifinals
4	(France) V Gracheva	4	3
6	(Denmark) C Tauson	6	6

== Qualifying ==
=== Seeds ===
1. (Japan) Nao Hibino (moved to main draw)
2. (United States) Varvara Lepchenko (qualified)
3. (Thailand) Mananchaya Sawangkaew (moved to main draw)
4. (China) Ma Yexin (qualified)

=== Qualifiers ===
1. (China) Yang Yidi
2. (United States) Varvara Lepchenko
3. (Thailand) Peangtarn Plipuech
4. (China) Ma Yexin

=== Lucky loser ===
1. (United States) Jessie Aney

=== Qualifying draw ===
==== First qualifier ====
Qualifying competition
Alt	(China) Yang Yidi	6	0
PR	Margarita Betova	4	0^{r}

==== Second qualifier ====
Qualifying competition
2	(United States) Varvara Lepchenko	6	6
WC	(Hong Kong) Justine Leong	0	0

==== Third qualifier ====
Qualifying competition
Alt	(United States) Jessie Aney	6	6^{4}	5
	(Thailand) Peangtarn Plipuech	4	7^{7}	7

==== Fourth qualifier ====
Qualifying competition
4	(China) Ma Yexin	7^{8}	6
WC	(Hong Kong) Wu Ho-ching	6^{6}	3
