= 2025 Birmingham Open – Men's doubles =

Men's doubles
- 2025 Birmingham Open

Final
- Champions: (Brazil) Marcelo Demoliner (France) Sadio Doumbia
- Runners-up: (Ecuador) Diego Hidalgo (United States) Patrik Trhac
- Score: 6–4, 3–6, [10–5]

Events
Singles	men	women
Doubles	men	women
Birmingham Open	· 2026 →

This was the first edition of the tournament.

Marcelo Demoliner and Sadio Doumbia won the title after defeating Diego Hidalgo and Patrik Trhac 6–4, 3–6, [10–5] in the final.

== Seeds ==
1. (United States) Nathaniel Lammons / (United States) Jackson Withrow (first round)
2. (Mexico) Santiago González / (Brazil) Rafael Matos (first round)
3. (France) Théo Arribagé / (Germany) Constantin Frantzen (quarterfinals)
4. (Brazil) Marcelo Demoliner / (France) Sadio Doumbia (champions)

== Draw ==
=== Key ===
- Q = Qualifier
- WC = Wild card
- LL = Lucky loser
- Alt = Alternate
- ITF = ITF entry
- PR = Protected ranking
- SR = Special ranking
- SE = Special exempt
- JE = Junior exempt
- JR = Junior Accelerator Programme entrant
- CO = College Accelerator Programme entrant
- NG = Next Gen Accelerator Program entrant
- w/o = Walkover
- r = Retired
- d = Defaulted

=== Draw ===
First round
1	(United States) N Lammons (United States) J Withrow	3	2
Alt	(Switzerland) M-A Hüsler (Poland) K Majchrzak	6	6
(Australia) B Bayldon (United States) R Stalder	6	7^{7}
(United Kingdom) J Paris (Japan) T Yuzuki	4	6^{5}
4	(Brazil) M Demoliner (France) S Doumbia	6	6
WC	(United Kingdom) L Maxted (United Kingdom) J Pinnington Jones	3	3
(Spain) S Martos Gornés (India) VS Prashanth	6^{15}	4
(United States) B Holt (Australia) T Schoolkate	7^{17}	6
Alt	(Chile) N Jarry (Australia) A Vukic	4	3
(Ecuador) D Hidalgo (United States) P Trhac	6	6
(United Kingdom) B Harris (United Kingdom) M Willis	6	3	[9]
3	(France) T Arribagé (Germany) C Frantzen	3	6	[11]
(Canada) C Harper (United States) R Seggerman	6^{4}	4
(Colombia) N Barrientos (India) RC Bollipalli	7^{7}	6
WC	(United Kingdom) J Monday (United Kingdom) D Stevenson	5	6	[10]
2	(Mexico) S González (Brazil) R Matos	7	3	[5]

Quarterfinals
Alt	(Switzerland) M-A Hüsler (Poland) K Majchrzak
(Australia) B Bayldon (United States) R Stalder	w/o
4	(Brazil) M Demoliner (France) S Doumbia	4
(United States) B Holt (Australia) T Schoolkate	2^{r}
(Ecuador) D Hidalgo (United States) P Trhac	7^{7}	6
3	(France) T Arribagé (Germany) C Frantzen	6^{4}	3
(Colombia) N Barrientos (India) RC Bollipalli	4	4
WC	(United Kingdom) J Monday (United Kingdom) D Stevenson	6	6

Semifinals
(Australia) B Bayldon (United States) R Stalder	2	4
4	(Brazil) M Demoliner (France) S Doumbia	6	6
(Ecuador) D Hidalgo (United States) P Trhac	6	6
WC	(United Kingdom) J Monday (United Kingdom) D Stevenson	4	4

Final
4	(Brazil) M Demoliner (France) S Doumbia	6	3	[10]
(Ecuador) D Hidalgo (United States) P Trhac	4	6	[5]
