= 2025 Birmingham Open – Men's singles =

Men's singles
- 2025 Birmingham Open

Final
- Champion: (Finland) Otto Virtanen
- Runner-up: (United States) Colton Smith
- Score: 6–4, 6–4

Events
Singles	men	women
Doubles	men	women
Birmingham Open	· 2026 →

This was the first edition of the tournament.

Otto Virtanen won the title after defeating Colton Smith 6–4, 6–4 in the final.

== Seeds ==
1. (Italy) Mattia Bellucci (first round)
2. (Japan) Yoshihito Nishioka (first round, retired)
3. (Australia) Rinky Hijikata (semifinals)
4. (Australia) Aleksandar Vukic (first round)
5. (Australia) Christopher O'Connell (first round)
6. (Australia) James Duckworth (first round)
7. (Poland) Kamil Majchrzak (first round)
8. (United States) Mackenzie McDonald (first round)

== Draw ==
=== Key ===
- Q = Qualifier
- WC = Wild card
- LL = Lucky loser
- Alt = Alternate
- ITF = ITF entry
- PR = Protected ranking
- SR = Special ranking
- SE = Special exempt
- JE = Junior exempt
- JR = Junior Accelerator Programme entrant
- CO = College Accelerator Programme entrant
- NG = Next Gen Accelerator Program entrant
- w/o = Walkover
- r = Retired
- d = Defaulted

=== Finals ===
Semifinals
Alt	(United States) Colton Smith	6	6
3	(Australia) Rinky Hijikata	3	4
(Finland) Otto Virtanen	6	4	7^{7}
(United States) Brandon Holt	4	6	6^{3}

Final
Alt	(United States) Colton Smith	4	4
(Finland) Otto Virtanen	6	6

=== Top half ===
First round
1	(Italy) M Bellucci	6	4	6^{5}
NG	(Spain) M Landaluce	4	6	7^{7}
WC	(United Kingdom) J Clarke	4	6	4
PR	(South Africa) L Harris	6	3	6
Q	(Japan) Y Uchiyama	2	7^{7}	4
Alt	(United States) C Smith	6	6^{3}	6
Alt	(United States) N Moreno de Alboran	6	6
5	(Australia) C O'Connell	4	3
3	(Australia) R Hijikata	6	3	6
(United Kingdom) B Harris	1	6	4
Q	(Japan) Y Watanuki	6	6
Alt	(Belgium) A Blockx	4	4
(United States) E Spizzirri	3	3
LL	(Australia) L Tu	6	6
Q	(Australia) A Bolt	6	7^{7}
8	(United States) M McDonald	4	6^{3}

Second round
NG	(Spain) M Landaluce	4	2
PR	(South Africa) L Harris	6	6
Alt	(United States) C Smith	6	0
Alt	(United States) N Moreno de Alboran	3	1^{r}
3	(Australia) R Hijikata	6	6
Q	(Japan) Y Watanuki	1	3
LL	(Australia) L Tu	2	3
Q	(Australia) A Bolt	6	6

Quarterfinals
PR	(South Africa) L Harris	3	7^{7}	4
Alt	(United States) C Smith	6	6^{3}	6
3	(Australia) R Hijikata	7^{7}	6
Q	(Australia) A Bolt	6^{2}	4

Semifinals
Alt	(United States) C Smith	6	6
3	(Australia) R Hijikata	3	4

=== Bottom half ===
First round
7	(Poland) K Majchrzak	4	6^{3}
Q	(United States) Z Svajda	6	7^{7}
WC	(United Kingdom) J Monday	1	7	3
Q	(Hong Kong) C Wong	6	5	6
Alt	(Switzerland) M-A Hüsler	7^{7}	6
(France) H Mayot	6^{1}	4
(Finland) O Virtanen	7^{7}	6
4	(Australia) A Vukic	6^{4}	3
6	(Australia) J Duckworth	2	5
(United States) B Holt	6	7
WC	(United Kingdom) D Evans	6^{5}	6^{5}
Q	(United States) M Cassone	7^{7}	7^{7}
(Australia) T Schoolkate	7^{10}	4	4
(Chile) N Jarry	6^{8}	6	6
(France) A Mannarino	7^{7}	3
2	(Japan) Y Nishioka	6^{1}	2^{r}

Second round
Q	(United States) Z Svajda	6	3	2
Q	(Hong Kong) C Wong	4	6	6
Alt	(Switzerland) M-A Hüsler	3	7^{8}	1
(Finland) O Virtanen	6	6^{6}	6
(United States) B Holt	6	6
Q	(United States) M Cassone	2	2
(Chile) N Jarry	6^{6}	3
(France) A Mannarino	7^{8}	6

Quarterfinals
Q	(Hong Kong) C Wong	2	5
(Finland) O Virtanen	6	7
(United States) B Holt	6	6
(France) A Mannarino	4	3

Semifinals
(Finland) O Virtanen	6	4	7^{7}
(United States) B Holt	4	6	6^{3}
