= 2024 Birmingham Classic =

- Date: 17–23 June
- Edition: 42nd
- Category: WTA 250 tournaments
- Draw: 32S / 16D
- Surface: Grass
- Location: Birmingham, United Kingdom
- Venue: Edgbaston Priory Club

Champions

Singles
- (Kazakhstan) Yulia Putintseva

Doubles
- (Chinese Taipei) Hsieh Su-wei / (Belgium) Elise Mertens
← 2023 ·	Birmingham Classic	· 2025 →

The 2024 Birmingham Classic (also known as the Rothesay Classic Birmingham for sponsorship reasons) was a women's tennis tournament played on outdoor grass courts. It was the 42nd edition of the event, and a WTA 250 tournament on the 2024 WTA Tour. It took place at the Edgbaston Priory Club in Birmingham, United Kingdom, on 17–23 June 2024.

== Champions ==
=== Singles ===
- (Kazakhstan) Yulia Putintseva def. (Australia) Ajla Tomljanović, 6–1, 7–6^{(10–8)}

=== Doubles ===
- (Chinese Taipei) Hsieh Su-wei / (Belgium) Elise Mertens def. (Japan) Miyu Kato / (China) Zhang Shuai, 6–1, 6–3

== Singles main draw entrants ==
=== Seeds ===
Country	Player	Rank^{1}	Seed
LAT	Jeļena Ostapenko	13	1
CZE	Barbora Krejčíková	25	2
ROU	Sorana Cîrstea	29	3
GBR	Katie Boulter	30	4
BEL	Elise Mertens	32	5
CAN	Leylah Fernandez	33	6
	Anastasia Potapova	36	7
CZE	Marie Bouzková	37	8

- ^{1} Rankings are as of 10 June 2024.

=== Other entrants ===
The following players received wildcards into the main draw:

- (United Kingdom) Harriet Dart
- (United States) Sloane Stephens
- (United Kingdom) Heather Watson
- (Denmark) Caroline Wozniacki

The following player received entry using a protected ranking:

- (Australia) Ajla Tomljanović

The following players received entry from the qualifying draw:

- Elina Avanesyan
- (Switzerland) Viktorija Golubic
- (Colombia) Camila Osorio
- (United Kingdom) Amelia Rajecki
- (Australia) Daria Saville
- (Japan) Moyuka Uchijima

The following player received entry as a lucky loser:

- (United States) Caroline Dolehide

=== Withdrawals ===
- Mirra Andreeva → replaced by (Poland) Magdalena Fręch

== Doubles main draw entrants ==
=== Seeds ===
Country	Player	Country	Player	Rank^{1}	Seed
TPE	Hsieh Su-wei	BEL	Elise Mertens	3	1
CAN	Gabriela Dabrowski	NZL	Erin Routliffe	10	2
CZE	Marie Bouzková	ESP	Sara Sorribes Tormo	44	3
USA	Asia Muhammad	INA	Aldila Sutjiadi	65	4

- ^{1} Rankings are as of 10 June 2024.

=== Other entrants ===
The following pairs received wildcards into the doubles main draw:

- (United Kingdom) Alicia Barnett / (United Kingdom) Freya Christie
- (United Kingdom) Samantha Murray Sharan / (United Kingdom) Eden Silva
