= 2024 Birmingham Classic – Singles =

Singles
- 2024 Birmingham Classic

Final
- Champion: (Kazakhstan) Yulia Putintseva
- Runner-up: (Australia) Ajla Tomljanović
- Score: 6–1, 7–6^{(10–8)}

Details
- Draw: 32 (6 Q / 4 WC )
- Seeds: 8

Events
Singles	Doubles
← 2023 ·	Birmingham Classic	· 2025 →

Yulia Putintseva defeated Ajla Tomljanović in the final, 6–1, 7–6^{(10–8)} to win the singles tennis title at the 2024 Birmingham Classic. It was her third WTA Tour title, and first since 2021.

Jeļena Ostapenko was the defending champion, but lost in the first round to Elisabetta Cocciaretto.

== Seeds ==
1. (Latvia) Jeļena Ostapenko (first round)
2. (Czech Republic) Barbora Krejčíková (quarterfinals)
3. (Romania) Sorana Cîrstea (first round)
4. (United Kingdom) Katie Boulter (first round, retired)
5. (Belgium) Elise Mertens (second round, retired)
6. (Canada) Leylah Fernandez (quarterfinals)
7. Anastasia Potapova (semifinals)
8. (Czech Republic) Marie Bouzková (second round)

== Draw ==
=== Key ===
- Q = Qualifier
- WC = Wild card
- LL = Lucky loser
- Alt = Alternate
- ITF = ITF entry
- PR = Protected ranking
- SR = Special ranking
- SE = Special exempt
- JE = Junior exempt
- JR = Junior Accelerator Programme entrant
- CO = College Accelerator Programme entrant
- NG = Next Gen Accelerator Program entrant
- w/o = Walkover
- r = Retired
- d = Defaulted

=== Finals ===
Semifinals
(Italy) Elisabetta Cocciaretto	2	2
(Kazakhstan) Yulia Putintseva	6	6
PR	(Australia) Ajla Tomljanović	7^{7}	6
7	Anastasia Potapova	6^{5}	4

Final
(Kazakhstan) Yulia Putintseva	6	7^{10}
PR	(Australia) Ajla Tomljanović	1	6^{8}

=== Top half ===
First round
1	(Latvia) J Ostapenko	3	3
(Italy) E Cocciaretto	6	6
(China) Y Yuan	3	3
WC	(United States) S Stephens	6	6
D Shnaider	7	6
Q	(United Kingdom) A Rajecki	5	3
WC	(United Kingdom) H Watson	6	4	5
8	(Czech Republic) M Bouzková	3	6	7
4	(United Kingdom) K Boulter	3	0^{r}
(Ukraine) A Kalinina	6	0
(Kazakhstan) Y Putintseva	6	6
(France) C Burel	3	4
(Czech Republic) Ka Plíšková	6	3	6^{5}
LL	(United States) C Dolehide	2	6	7^{7}
WC	(Denmark) C Wozniacki	4	1
5	(Belgium) E Mertens	6	6

Second round
(Italy) E Cocciaretto	6	6
WC	(United States) S Stephens	4	2
D Shnaider	7^{7}	6
8	(Czech Republic) M Bouzková	6^{5}	3
(Ukraine) A Kalinina	3	0
(Kazakhstan) Y Putintseva	6	6
LL	(United States) C Dolehide	6	3
5	(Belgium) E Mertens	3	0^{r}

Quarterfinals
(Italy) E Cocciaretto	5	6	6
D Shnaider	7	4	2
(Kazakhstan) Y Putintseva	6	6^{2}	6
LL	(United States) C Dolehide	3	7^{7}	1

Semifinals
(Italy) E Cocciaretto	2	2
(Kazakhstan) Y Putintseva	6	6

=== Bottom half ===
First round
6	(Canada) L Fernandez	6	6
(Spain) S Sorribes Tormo	1	1
Q	(Colombia) C Osorio	4	6	3
Q	(Switzerland) V Golubic	6	1	6
PR	(Australia) A Tomljanović	6	6
A Blinkova	2	1
(China) L Zhu	7^{7}	6
3	(Romania) S Cîrstea	6^{2}	2
7	A Potapova	6	6
Q	E Avanesyan	4	4
(Italy) L Bronzetti	2	6	6
(Poland) M Fręch	6	3	4
Q	(Japan) M Uchijima	3	3
WC	(United Kingdom) H Dart	6	6
Q	(Australia) D Saville	1	6^{5}
2	(Czech Republic) B Krejčíková	6	7^{7}

Second round
6	(Canada) L Fernandez	4	7	6
Q	(Switzerland) V Golubic	6	5	3
PR	(Australia) A Tomljanović	6^{6}	6	6
(China) L Zhu	7^{8}	1	4
7	A Potapova	6	7
(Italy) L Bronzetti	3	5
WC	(United Kingdom) H Dart	3	4
2	(Czech Republic) B Krejčíková	6	6

Quarterfinals
6	(Canada) L Fernandez	6	3	2
PR	(Australia) A Tomljanović	1	6	6
7	A Potapova	6	6
2	(Czech Republic) B Krejčíková	1	4

Semifinals
PR	(Australia) A Tomljanović	7^{7}	6
7	A Potapova	6^{5}	4

== Qualifying ==
=== Seeds ===
1. (Romania) Ana Bogdan (first round, withdrew)
2. (United States) Caroline Dolehide (qualifying competition, lucky loser)
3. (Spain) Cristina Bucșa (qualifying competition)
4. (United States) Ashlyn Krueger (first round, withdrew)
5. (France) Varvara Gracheva (first round)
6. (China) Wang Yafan (first round)
7. (Switzerland) Viktorija Golubic (qualified)
8. (Japan) Moyuka Uchijima (qualified)
9. (United States) Katie Volynets (qualifying competition)
10. Elina Avanesyan (qualified)
11. (Colombia) Camila Osorio (qualified)
12. (Australia) Daria Saville (qualified)

=== Qualifiers ===
1. (Switzerland) Viktorija Golubic
2. Elina Avanesyan
3. (Australia) Daria Saville
4. (Colombia) Camila Osorio
5. (Japan) Moyuka Uchijima
6. (United Kingdom) Amelia Rajecki

=== Lucky loser ===
1. (United States) Caroline Dolehide

=== Qualifying draw ===
==== First qualifier ====
First round
1	(Romania) Ana Bogdan
(Czech Republic) Linda Fruhvirtová	w/o
(Croatia) Jana Fett	4	1
7	(Switzerland) Viktorija Golubic	6	6

Qualifying competition
(Czech Republic) Linda Fruhvirtová	7	2	2
7	(Switzerland) Viktorija Golubic	5	6	6

==== Second qualifier ====
First round
2	(United States) Caroline Dolehide	6	3	6
(United Kingdom) Eden Silva	3	6	3
(United Kingdom) Emily Appleton	3	4
10	Elina Avanesyan	6	6

Qualifying competition
2	(United States) Caroline Dolehide	1	4
10	Elina Avanesyan	6	6

==== Third qualifier ====
First round
3	(Spain) Cristina Bucșa	7	3	7^{7}
(Colombia) Emiliana Arango	5	6	6^{3}
(Australia) Olivia Gadecki	4	6	1
12	(Australia) Daria Saville	6	3	6

Qualifying competition
3	(Spain) Cristina Bucșa	6^{5}	4
12	(Australia) Daria Saville	7^{7}	6

==== Fourth qualifier ====
First round
4	(United States) Ashlyn Krueger
Anastasia Zakharova	w/o
WC	(United Kingdom) Mika Stojsavljevic	2	3
11	(Colombia) Camila Osorio	6	6

Qualifying competition
Anastasia Zakharova	0	6	3
11	(Colombia) Camila Osorio	6	4	6

==== Fifth qualifier ====
First round
5	(France) Varvara Gracheva	6	2	3
(Czech Republic) Tereza Martincová	3	6	6
WC	(United Kingdom) Freya Christie	4	4
8	(Japan) Moyuka Uchijima	6	6

Qualifying competition
(Czech Republic) Tereza Martincová	7	4	4
8	(Japan) Moyuka Uchijima	5	6	6

==== Sixth qualifier ====
First round
6	(China) Wang Yafan	6^{5}	6^{6}
WC	(United Kingdom) Amelia Rajecki	7^{7}	7^{8}
WC	(United Kingdom) Sarah Beth Grey	4	1
9	(United States) Katie Volynets	6	6

Qualifying competition
WC	(United Kingdom) Amelia Rajecki	6	6^{5}	6
9	(United States) Katie Volynets	3	7^{7}	4
