= Hong Kong 125 Open =

WTA 125K series
- Location: Hong Kong, China
- Venue: Victoria Park, Hong Kong
- Category: WTA 125 tournaments
- Surface: Hard
- Draw: 32S / 8Q / 8D
- Prize money: US$115,000 (2024)

Current champions (2024)
- Singles: (Australia) Ajla Tomljanović
- Doubles: (Romania) Monica Niculescu (Romania) Elena-Gabriela Ruse

The Hong Kong 125 Open (also known as the Prudential Hong Kong Tennis 125 for sponsorship reasons) is a tennis tournament held in Hong Kong since 2024. The event is part of the WTA 125 tournaments and is played on outdoor hardcourts.

== Past finals ==
=== Singles ===
Year	Champion	Runner-up	Score
2024	(Australia) Ajla Tomljanović	(Denmark) Clara Tauson	4–6, 6–4, 6–4

=== Doubles ===
Year	Champions	Runners-up	Score
2024	(Romania) Monica Niculescu (Romania) Elena-Gabriela Ruse	(Japan) Nao Hibino (Japan) Makoto Ninomiya	6–3, 5–7, [10–5]
