= 2025 Birmingham Open =

- Date: 2–8 June
- Edition: 1st (men); 43rd (women)
- Category: ATP Challenger Tour 125; WTA 125
- Draw: 32S / 16D
- Surface: Grass
- Location: Birmingham, United Kingdom
- Venue: Edgbaston Priory Club

Champions

Men's singles
- (Finland) Otto Virtanen

Women's singles
- (Belgium) Greet Minnen

Men's doubles
- (Brazil) Marcelo Demoliner / (France) Sadio Doumbia

Women's doubles
- (Australia) Destanee Aiava / (Spain) Cristina Bucșa
- Birmingham Classic

The 2025 Lexus Birmingham Open was a tennis tournament played on outdoor grass courts. It was the first edition of the men's event and the 43rd edition of the women's event. The tournament was classified as a 2025 ATP Challenger 125 tournament and a 2025 WTA 125 tournament (downgraded from WTA 250 status in previous years). It took place at the Edgbaston Priory Club in Birmingham, United Kingdom, on 2–8 June 2025.

== ATP singles main-draw entrants ==
=== Seeds ===
Country	Player	Rank^{1}	Seed
ITA	Mattia Bellucci	68	1
JPN	Yoshihito Nishioka	77	2
AUS	Rinky Hijikata	78	3
AUS	Aleksandar Vukic	80	4
AUS	Christopher O'Connell	82	5
AUS	James Duckworth	92	6
POL	Kamil Majchrzak	96	7
USA	Mackenzie McDonald	98	8

- ^{1} Rankings are as of 26 May 2025.

=== Other entrants ===
The following players received wildcards into the singles main draw:

- (United Kingdom) Jay Clarke
- (United Kingdom) Dan Evans
- (United Kingdom) Johannus Monday

The following player received entry into the singles main draw using a protected ranking:

- (South Africa) Lloyd Harris

The following player received entry through the Next Gen Accelerator programme:

- (Spain) Martín Landaluce

The following players received entry into the singles main draw as alternates:

- (Belgium) Alexander Blockx
- (Switzerland) Marc-Andrea Hüsler
- (United States) Nicolas Moreno de Alboran
- (United States) Colton Smith

The following players received entry from the qualifying draw:

- (Australia) Alex Bolt
- (United States) Murphy Cassone
- (United States) Zachary Svajda
- (Japan) Yasutaka Uchiyama
- (Japan) Yosuke Watanuki
- (Hong Kong) Coleman Wong

The following player received entry as a lucky loser:

- (Australia) Li Tu

== WTA singles main draw entrants ==
=== Seeds ===
Country	Player	Rank^{1}	Seed
USA	Alycia Parks	52	1
AUS	Kimberly Birrell	66	2
PHI	Alexandra Eala	73	3
TUR	Zeynep Sönmez	76	4
BEL	Greet Minnen	77	5
SUI	Viktorija Golubic	78	6
GER	Tatjana Maria	79	3
AUS	Olivia Gadecki	91	8

- ^{1} Rankings are as of 26 May 2025.

=== Other entrants ===
The following players received wildcards into the main draw:

- (United Kingdom) Amarni Banks
- (United Kingdom) Jodie Burrage
- (United Kingdom) Heather Watson
- (United Kingdom) Mingge Xu

The following players received entry from the qualifying draw:

- (Australia) Lizette Cabrera
- Vitalia Diatchenko
- (Japan) Sayaka Ishii
- (Czech Republic) Tereza Martincová
- (Switzerland) Valentina Ryser
- (France) Harmony Tan

The following players received entry as lucky losers:

- (Netherlands) Arianne Hartono
- (China) Wei Sijia

=== Withdrawals ===
- (Spain) Cristina Bucșa → replaced by (China) Wei Sijia (LL)
- (United Kingdom) Harriet Dart → replaced by (Netherlands) Arianne Hartono (LL)
- (Poland) Magdalena Fręch → replaced by (France) Jessika Ponchet
- (United Kingdom) Sonay Kartal → replaced by (Australia) Talia Gibson
- (Romania) Elena-Gabriela Ruse → replaced by (Croatia) Jana Fett
- (Croatia) Antonia Ružić → replaced by (Czech Republic) Linda Fruhvirtová
- (Thailand) Mananchaya Sawangkaew → replaced by (Australia) Maddison Inglis
- (Ukraine) Yuliia Starodubtseva → replaced by (Italy) Lucrezia Stefanini
- (Australia) Ajla Tomljanović → replaced by (Poland) Katarzyna Kawa
- (China) Yuan Yue → replaced by (Ukraine) Daria Snigur

== WTA doubles main draw entrants ==
=== Seeds ===
Country	Player	Country	Player	Rank^{1}	Seed
UKR	Nadiia Kichenok	CHN	Xu Yifan	88	1
AUS	Storm Hunter	AUS	Ellen Perez	120	2
JPN	Makoto Ninomiya	CHN	Tang Qianhui	133	3
GBR	Emily Appleton	GBR	Heather Watson	218	4

- ^{1} Rankings are as of 26 May 2025.

=== Other entrants ===
The following pair received a wildcard into the doubles main draw:

- (United Kingdom) Amelia Rajecki / (United Kingdom) Mingge Xu

== Champions ==
=== Men's singles ===
- (Finland) Otto Virtanen def. (United States) Colton Smith 6–4, 6–4.

=== Women's singles ===
- (Belgium) Greet Minnen def. (Czech Republic) Linda Fruhvirtová, 6–2, 6–1

=== Men's doubles ===
- (Brazil) Marcelo Demoliner / (France) Sadio Doumbia def. (Ecuador) Diego Hidalgo / (United States) Patrik Trhac 6–4, 3–6, [10–5].

=== Women's doubles ===
- (Australia) Destanee Aiava / (Spain) Cristina Bucșa def. (United Kingdom) Alicia Barnett / (France) Elixane Lechemia, 6–4, 6–2
