= Ajla Tomljanović =

Croatian-born Australian tennis player (born 1993)

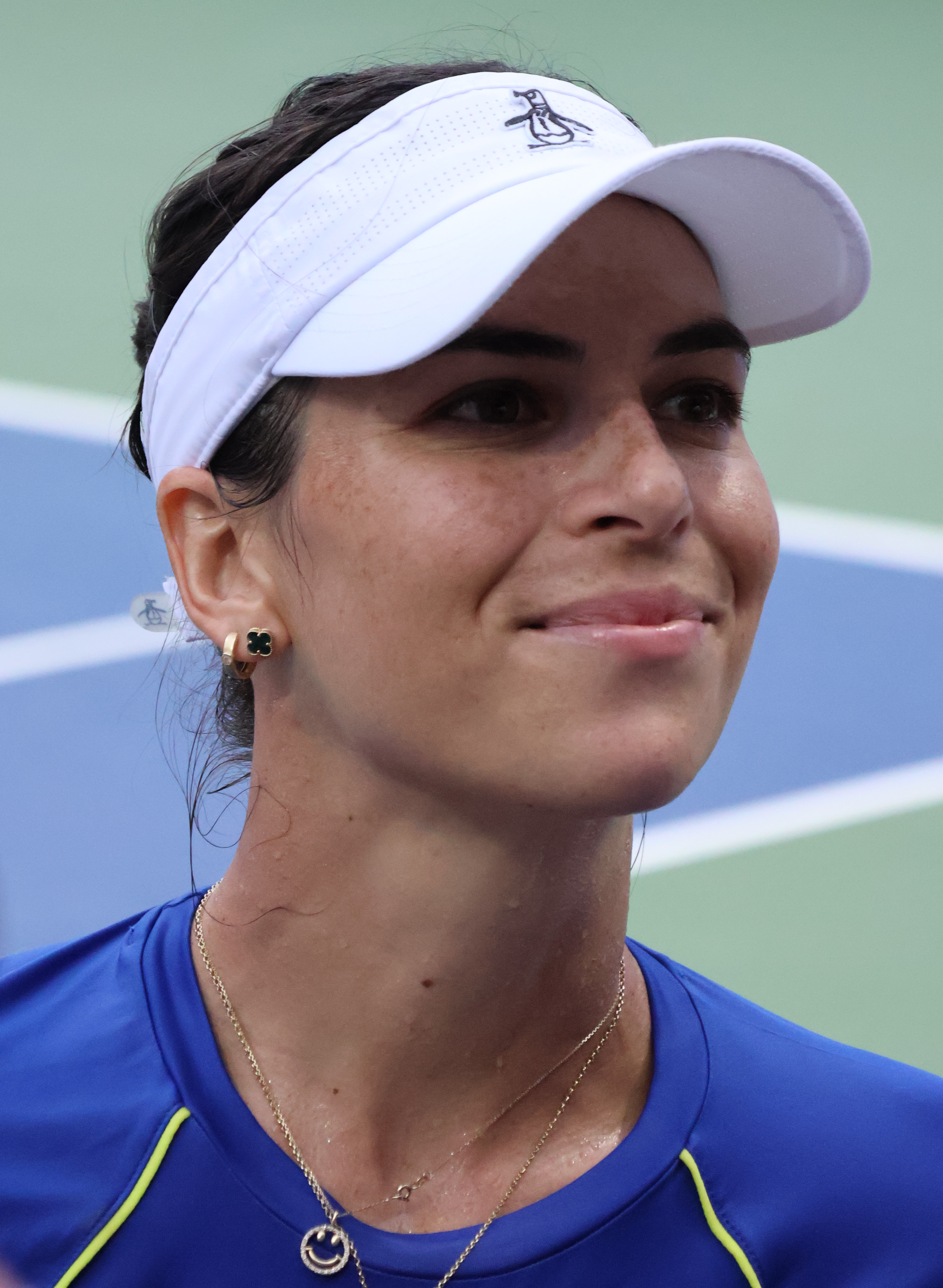
- Tomljanović at the 2023 US Open
- Country (sports): Croatia (2009–2018); Australia (2018–)
- Residence: Miami, Florida, U.S.
- Born: 7 May 1993 (age 33) Zagreb, Croatia
- Height: 1.80 m (5 ft 11 in)
- Turned pro: December 2009
- Plays: Right-handed (two-handed backhand)
- Coach: Alessandro Bega
- Prize money: US$ 7,675,937

Singles
- Career record: 438–341
- Career titles: 2 WTA 125, 4 ITF
- Highest ranking: No. 32 (3 April 2023)
- Current ranking: No. 131 (19 October 2026)

Grand Slam singles results
- Australian Open: 2R (2014, 2015, 2020, 2021, 2024, 2025, 2026)
- French Open: 4R (2014)
- Wimbledon: QF (2021, 2022)
- US Open: QF (2022)

Other tournaments
- Olympic Games: 2R (2021)

Doubles
- Career record: 80–102
- Career titles: 3 ITF
- Highest ranking: No. 47 (5 January 2015)
- Current ranking: No. 1619 (8 June 2026)

Grand Slam doubles results
- Australian Open: QF (2014)
- French Open: 3R (2022)
- Wimbledon: 3R (2015)
- US Open: 3R (2014, 2018)

Other doubles tournaments
- Olympic Games: 1R (2024)

Team competitions
- Fed Cup: F (2019, 2022); Record: 8–12
- Last updated on: 22 October 2026.

Ajla Tomljanović (Note: /ˈaɪlə təmˈjɑːnəvɪtʃ/ EYE-lə təm-YAH-nə-vitch; Croatian: [âjla tomʎǎːnoʋitɕ];) (born 7 May 1993) is a Croatian-Australian professional tennis player. On 3 April 2023, she reached a career-high singles ranking of world No. 32. On 5 January 2015, she peaked at No. 47 in the doubles rankings. She has won four singles and three doubles titles on the ITF Women's Circuit. In November 2023, she won her first WTA 125 tournament, in Florianópolis, and in October 2024 her second WTA 125 title, in Hong Kong.

Tomljanović was an accomplished junior player, having won the 2009 Australian Open girls' doubles title with Christina McHale. She reached a combined career-high junior ranking of world No. 4, on 30 March 2009.

Before 2014, Tomljanović played for her country of birth, Croatia. She began competing for Australia at the 2014 US Open after obtaining permanent residency in Australia. For the next four years she was required to represent Croatia at all non-Grand Slam events, until she was granted Australian citizenship in January 2018, allowing her to represent the country at all events on the WTA Tour.

== Early and personal life ==
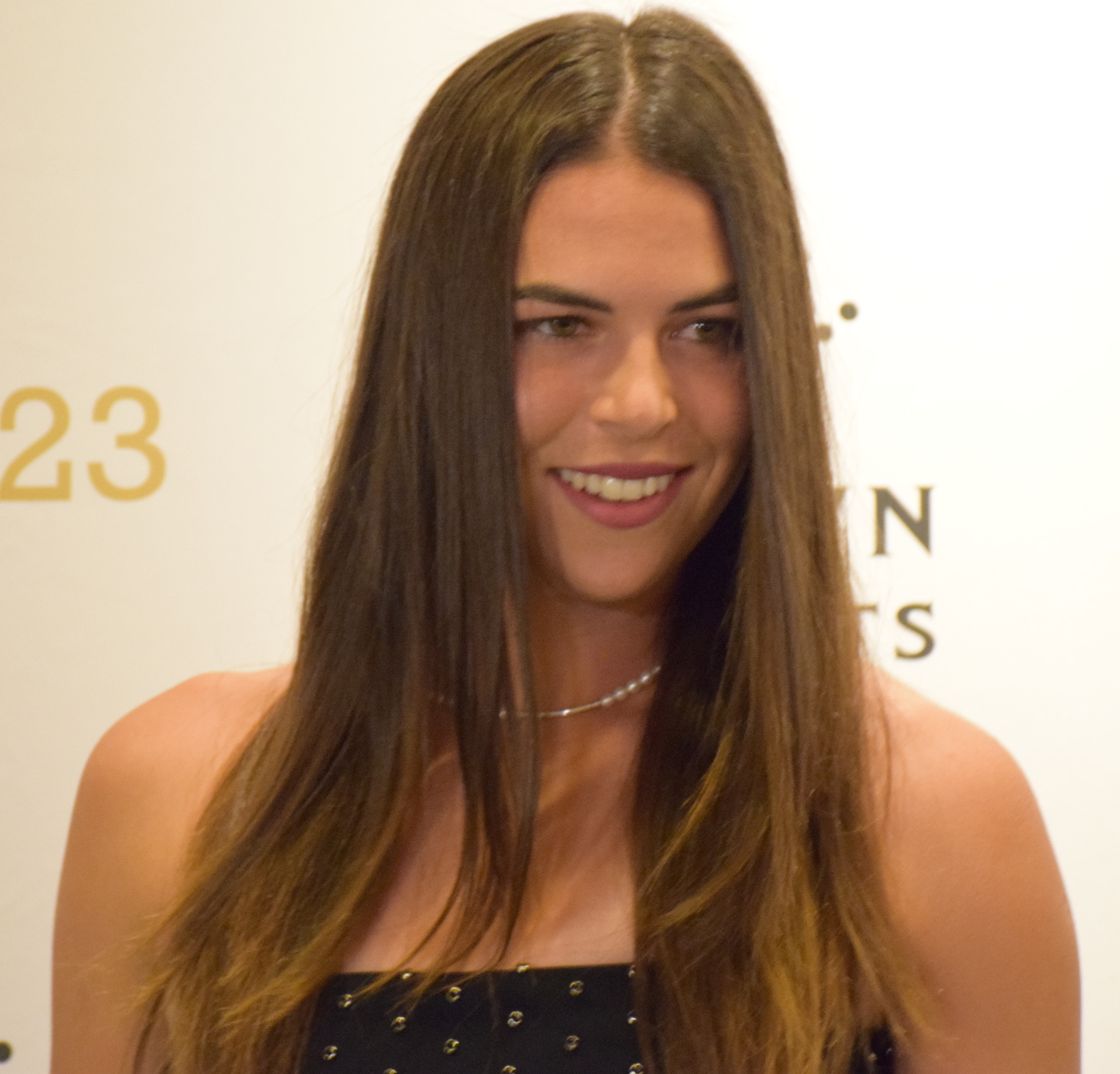
Tomljanović at the Australian Open Players' Party in 2015

Tomljanović was born in Zagreb to Croatian father Ratko Tomljanović who played handball professionally (junior world champion for Yugoslavia in 1987 and winner of the 1992 and 1993 handball European Cup) and Bosniak mother Emina. Her older sister Hana played tennis for the University of Virginia. Ajla began playing tennis at the age of six and moved to Florida for higher level training when she was 13. In the latter stages of 2014, Tomljanović took up permanent residency in Brisbane to be closer to her cousin Isabella Bozicevic's family who were based in the neighbouring Gold Coast as well as begin training at the Queensland Tennis Centre and in doing so switched allegiances to represent Australia in the four Grand Slams.

Tomljanović became an Australian citizen in January 2018. After her application for Australian citizenship was approved it allowed her to begin representing her adopted country at WTA Tour events as well as competing for Australia in the Fed Cup.

She was in a relationship with Australian tennis player Nick Kyrgios from 2017 to 2018. From 2019 until 2022, she dated Italian tennis player Matteo Berrettini. Tomljanovic is close friends with fellow player Félix Auger-Aliassime, who is married to her cousin Nina Ghaibi.

Along with tennis, she is also a fan of basketball.

== Coaching ==
Tomljanović was coached by Fernando Martínez and Rene Gomez. She was also coached by Ivan Cinkuš. She is currently working with Alessandro Bega.

== Career ==
=== 2008-2012: Early years ===
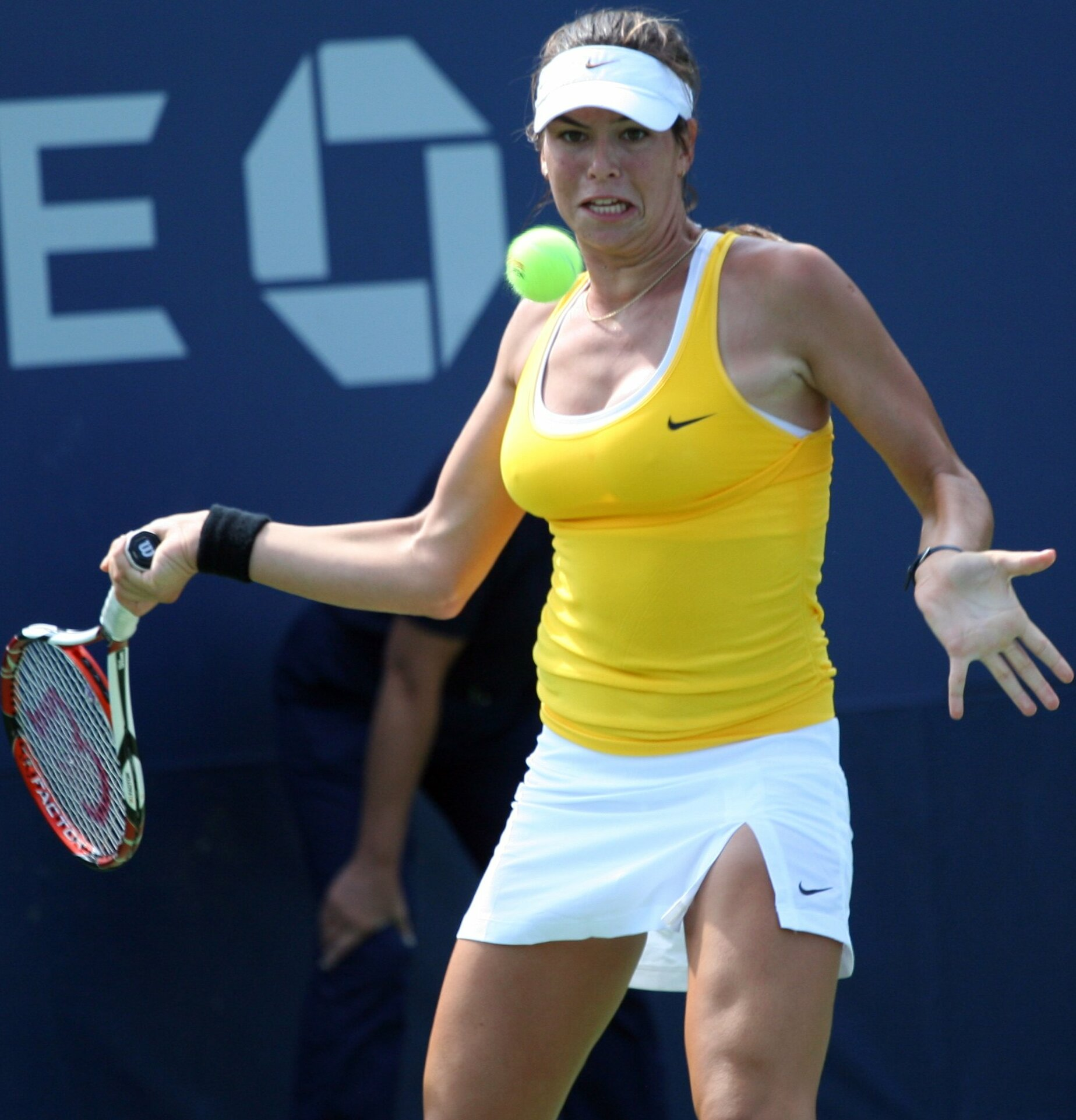
Tomljanović at the 2009 US Open

Tomljanović played her first professional ITF Circuit event in October 2008 in Mexico City, and lost to Estefanía Craciún in the semifinals. She then qualified for another ITF event in Mexico City, but lost to Karolina Kosińska in the second round. In January 2009, she qualified for the ITF event in Boca Raton, Florida, where she lost to Heidi El Tabakh in the second round. Tomljanović was awarded a wildcard for Indian Wells Open in, and lost to Angela Haynes. Tomljanović then suffered three consecutive losses in the second rounds of Redding, California, Osprey, Florida, and Makarska, Croatia, losing to Rika Fujiwara, Kateřina Kramperová and Ana Savić, respectively. At the ITF event in Zagreb, she lost to Tereza Hladíková in the first round. On 10 May 2009 in Zagreb, she won her first ITF doubles title, partnering with fellow Croatian Petra Martić.

==== Juniors ====
Tomljanović won the 2009 Australian Open girls' doubles title with Christina McHale, defeating Aleksandra Krunić and Sandra Zaniewska in the final.

Tomljanović missed most of the 2012 season due to mononucleosis.

=== 2014: French Open fourth round, top 50 breakthrough ===
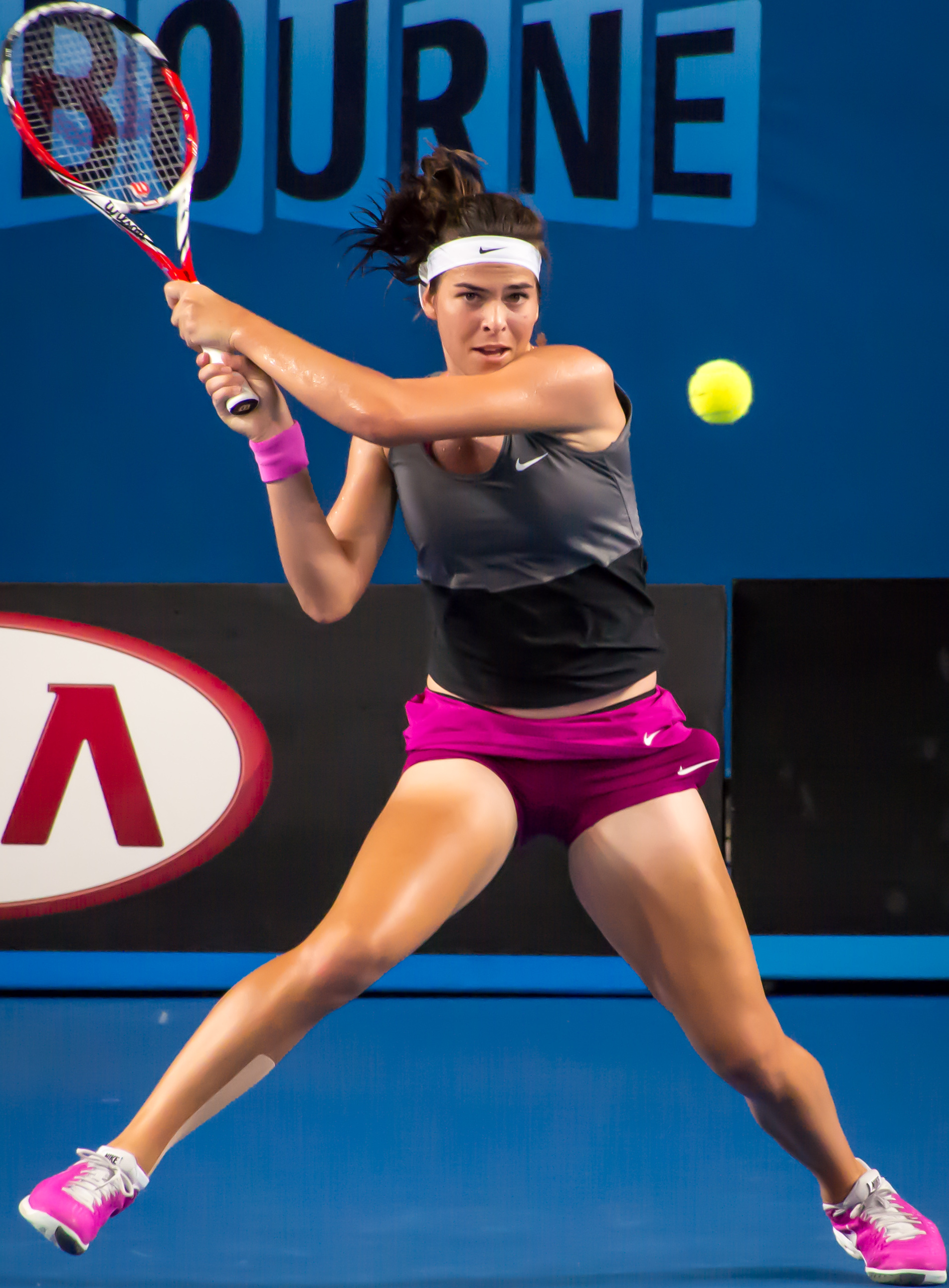
Tomljanović at the 2014 Australian Open

During the preseason, Tomljanović began working with coach David Taylor, former Australian Fed Cup captain, who had just parted company with Samantha Stosur.

She started the year at the Shenzhen Open, where she lost in the first round to eighth seed Annika Beck. Tomljanović then played as a wildcard at the Sydney International. She beat former world No. 5, Daniela Hantuchová, in the first round. She was defeated in the second round by Madison Keys, in three sets. Ranked 67 at the Australian Open, Tomljanović defeated Tadeja Majerič in the first round. In the second round, she lost to 13th seed Sloane Stephens in a three-setter.

She lost at the Pattaya Open in the first round to qualifier Alla Kudryavtseva, in straight sets. At the Mexican Open, she reached the quarterfinals by beating fourth seed Magdaléna Rybáriková and qualifier Victoria Duval. However, she lost in her quarterfinal match to eighth seed Zhang Shuai. At the Indian Wells Open, she lost in the second round to 17th seed Sloane Stephens. Tomljanović reached the third round at the Miami Open by defeating Kristina Mladenovic and 30th seed Garbiñe Muguruza. She ended up losing to American Varvara Lepchenko, in three sets.

Tomljanović started clay-court season at the Charleston Open. In the first round, she upset last year semifinalist Stefanie Vögele. In the second round, she got revenge on 16th seed Zhang Shuai. In the third round, she lost to second seed Jelena Janković. Tomljanović qualified for the main draw of the Porsche Tennis Grand Prix by beating Carina Witthöft, Sachia Vickery, and fifth seed Mona Barthel. In the first round, Tomljanović was defeated by Alisa Kleybanova. Seeded 13th, she lost in the first round of qualifying at the Madrid Open to Katarzyna Piter. Seeded 15th, she was defeated in the second round of qualifying at the Italian Open by Chanelle Scheepers, 6–2, 6–0. In her final tournament before the French Open, at the Internationaux de Strasbourg, Tomljanović lost in the second round to Zarina Diyas.

Ranked No. 72 at the French Open, she got her tournament run to a great start by upsetting 2010 French Open champion Francesca Schiavone in the first round. In the second, she upset 32nd seed Elena Vesnina, in two sets. Then she stunned third seed Agnieszka Radwańska to advance to the fourth round of a Grand Slam for the first time in her career, where her run came to an end when she lost to 14th seed Carla Suárez Navarro. Her best showing at the French Open improved her ranking from 72 to No. 51.

Tomljanović started on grass at the Birmingham Classic losing in the first round to Mona Barthel. Seeded third for qualifying at the Eastbourne International, she lost in the final round of qualifying to seventh seed Francesca Schiavone, 7–6, 0–6, 6–7. Ranked 53 at Wimbledon, Tomljanović was defeated in the opening round by Heather Watson.

In her first-round match at the Gastein Ladies, she retired trailing 6–3, 3–0 to qualifier Ana Bogdan.

Tomljanović began her US Open Series at the Stanford Classic where she was defeated in the first round by eighth seed Andrea Petkovic. Receiving a wildcard to play in the main draw at the Rogers Cup, she lost in the first round to qualifier Shelby Rogers. Seeded 11th for qualifying at the Western & Southern Open, Tomljanović lost in the first round of qualifying to Julia Görges. Ranked 55 at the US Open, she was defeated in the first round by 15th seed Carla Suárez Navarro.

Seeded second at the Tournoi de Québec, Tomljanović lost in the second round to Andrea Hlaváčková, in three sets. Seeded 15th for qualifying at the first edition of the Wuhan Open, she lost in the first round to Donna Vekić, in three sets. Seeded ninth for qualifying at the China Open, she lost in the final round to fourth seed Tsvetana Pironkova. Seeded eighth at the first edition of the Tianjin Open, Tomljanović reached the quarterfinals defeating qualifier Nadiia Kichenok and Duan Yingying. In the quarterfinals, she lost to second seed Peng Shuai. Tomljanović played her final tournament of the year at the Kremlin Cup. She defeated Alexandra Panova in the first round. In the second, she was defeated by fourth seed Lucie Šafářová.

Tomljanović ended the season ranked 63.

=== 2015: First final on WTA Tour ===
Tomljanović started the 2015 season at the Brisbane International which she entered as a wildcard. In the first round, she scored the biggest win of her career, defeating former world No. 1 and sixth seed, Jelena Janković, in straight sets. She saved two set points in the first set tiebreak on her way to her first-round victory. In the second round, she lost to Elina Svitolina. In Hobart, she was defeated in the first round by Karin Knapp. At the Australian Open, she lost in the second round to 30th seed Varvara Lepchenko.

At the Thailand Open, Tomljanović reached her first WTA Tour final; however, in the championship match, she was defeated by Daniela Hantuchová. As a result of her performance, she rose to world No. 49. Seeded tenth at the Mexican Open, she lost in the first round to Magdaléna Rybáriková. In March, Tomljanović competed at the Indian Wells Open. She was defeated in the first round by American wildcard Irina Falconi. Playing in Miami, she lost in the first round to Kurumi Nara.

Tomljanović began her clay-court season at the Family Circle Cup where she was defeated in the second round by Andreea Mitu. Seeded third at the Copa Colsanitas, Tomljanović lost in the first round to Alexandra Panova. At the Madrid Open, she was defeated in the second round by former world No. 1, Victoria Azarenka. She then attempted to qualify for the Italian Open but lost in the final round to Misaki Doi. Tomljanović played her final tournament before the French Open at the Internationaux de Strasbourg. She reached the quarterfinals where she was defeated by third seed and eventual champion, Sam Stosur. At the French Open, Tomljanović lost in the second round to 11th seed Angelique Kerber.

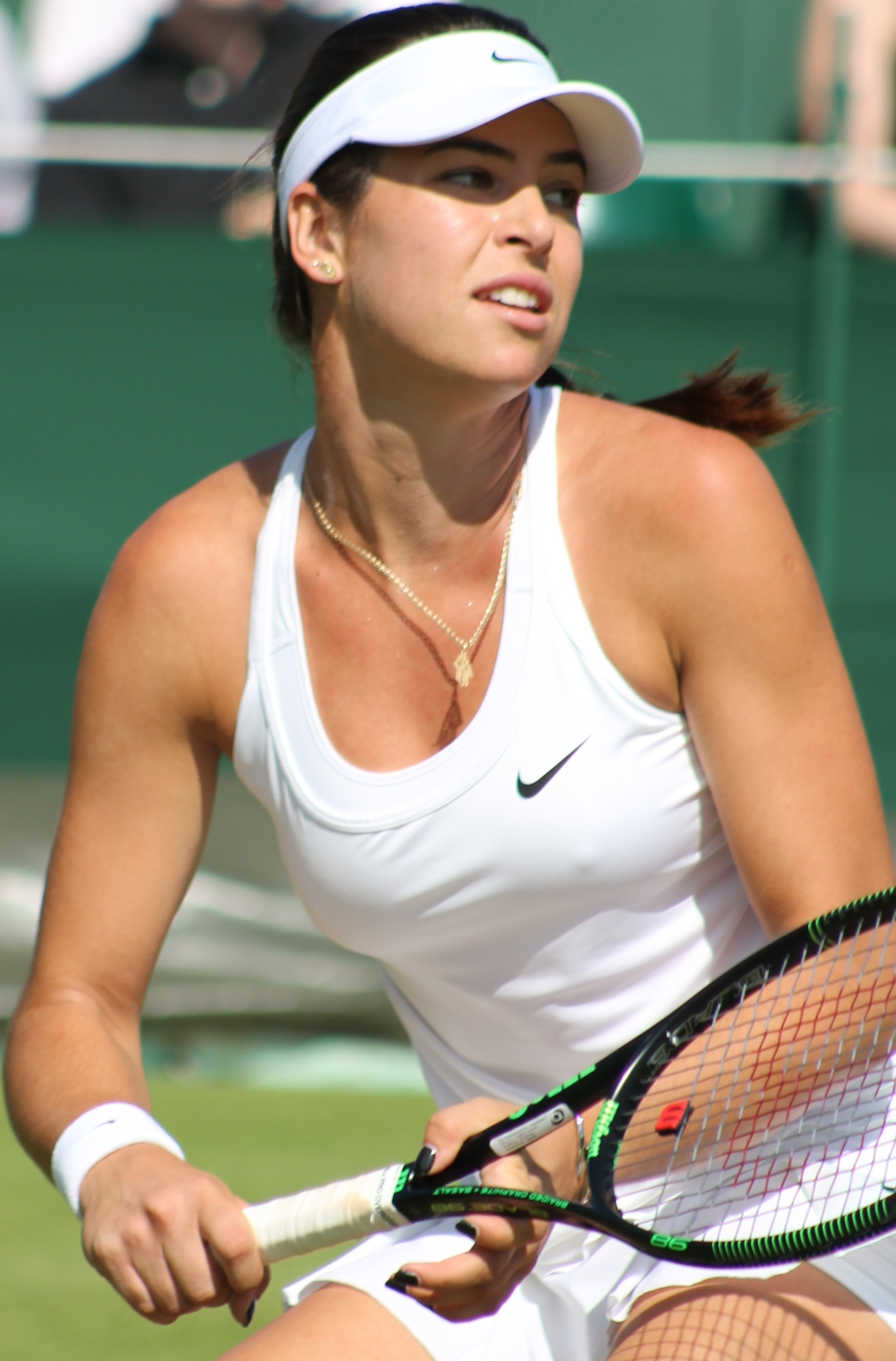
Tomljanović at the 2015 Wimbledon Championships

She began grass-court season at the first edition of the Nottingham Open. As the eighth seed, she was defeated in the first round by Lauren Davis. At the Birmingham Classic, Tomljanović lost in the first round to British wildcard Naomi Broady. Tomljanović was defeated in the second round of qualifying at the Eastbourne International to Irina Falconi. At Wimbledon, Tomljanović lost in the second round to 13th seed and 2012 finalist, Agnieszka Radwańska.

Seeded second at the Brasil Tennis Cup, she was defeated in the second round by Tereza Martincová.

Tomljanović competed on the US Open Series at the Stanford Classic where she advanced to the quarterfinals defeating Vitalia Diatchenko and seventh seed Madison Keys. She then lost her quarterfinal match to fourth seed and eventual finalist, Karolína Plíšková. At the Rogers Cup, she was defeated in the final round of qualifying by Irina Falconi. At the US Open, Tomljanović lost in the first round to Karin Knapp.

Seeded seventh at the Japan Women's Open, she reached the semifinals where she was defeated by Yanina Wickmayer. At the Korea Open, Tomljanović lost in the first round to Japanese wildcard Kimiko Date-Krumm. Despite qualifying for the Wuhan Open, she was defeated in the first round by 11th seed Belinda Bencic. Tomljanović played her final tournament of the year at the China Open. She retired in her final round of qualifying match against Yulia Putintseva.

Tomljanović ended the year ranked 66.

=== 2016: Shoulder injury ===
Tomljanović started her season at the Brisbane International. She lost in the first round to sixth seed Carla Suárez Navarro. At the Australian Open, she was defeated in the first round by Kateryna Bondarenko.

In February, Tomljanović underwent shoulder surgery, side-lining her for the rest of the season.

She ended the season ranked 930.

=== 2017: Return from injury ===
Tomljanović returned to competitive play in February at the Mexican Open. She won her first match since her return by upsetting sixth seed Eugenie Bouchard in the first round. In the second round, she retired after losing the first set to Kirsten Flipkens due to a right shoulder injury. At the Indian Wells Open, she lost in the first round to Julia Görges. In Miami, she had her second win of the season defeating lucky loser Magda Linette in the first round. Then, she stunned 13th seed and Indian Wells champion, Elena Vesnina, in three sets. In the third round, she was defeated by Lucie Šafářová. At the ITF Indian Harbour Beach, she lost in the first round to American wildcard entrant Victoria Duval.

Competing as a wildcard entrant at the Charlottesville Open, Tomljanović advanced to the semifinals where she lost to Caroline Dolehide. At the LTP Charleston Pro, she retired after losing the first set 4–6 to top seed Madison Brengle due to a hip injury. She competed in her final tournament before the French Open at the Nürnberger Versicherungscup and lost in the first round to Kirsten Flipkens. Ranked 311 at the French Open, she was defeated in the first round by 18th seed and last-year semifinalist Kiki Bertens.

Receiving a wildcard to play at the Bol Open, Tomljanović lost in the first round to eighth seed Maria Sakkari.

At the Stanford Classic, she retired in her first-round match due to a shoulder injury, after losing the first set 2–6 to sixth seed CoCo Vandeweghe.

After a first-round win over Johanna Larsson at the US Open, she lost in the second round to Aleksandra Krunić.

Tomljanović ended the season ranked 151.

=== 2018: Australian citizen, two WTA Tour finals ===
She commenced the new season at the Brisbane International defeating Destanee Aiava but lost in the second round to Johanna Konta. Tomljanović lost in the first round of the Australian Open to Lucie Šafářová before reaching consecutive semifinals on WTA 125 tournaments, at Newport Beach and Indian Wells.

Tomljanović reached the final in Rabat, where she lost to Elise Mertens. At the French Open, she lost to the fourth seed Elina Svitolina in the first round, losing a 5–1 lead in the first set.

At the US Open, Tomljanović lost in the second round to Kateřina Siniaková despite having a match point. Shortly after, she put together a good stretch of form to reach the final in Seoul, which she lost in three sets to Kiki Bertens.

Tomljanović ended the season ranked 43.

=== 2019: Fourth tour final, career-high ranking and top 40 debut ===
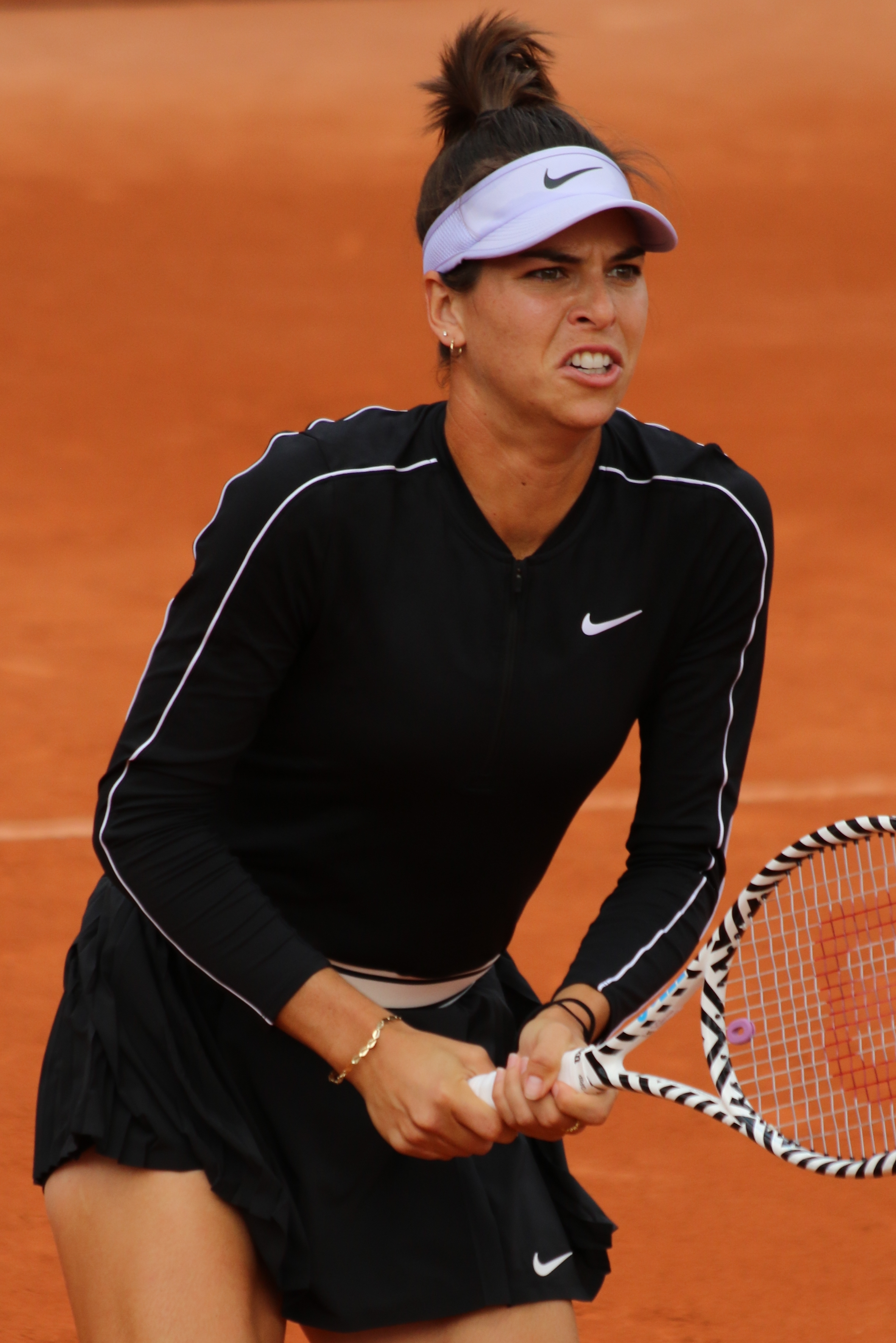
Tomljanović at the 2019 French Open

Tomljanović began season at the Brisbane International. She made it to the quarterfinals where she lost to fifth seed and eventual champion, Karolína Plíšková. In Sydney, she was defeated in the first round by Camila Giorgi. At the Australian Open, she lost in a first-round thriller to Johanna Konta.

Seeded sixth at the Thailand Open, Tomljanović reached the final where she lost to eighth seed Dayana Yastremska. She led 5–2 in the final set but couldn't close out the match. Coming through qualifying at the Qatar Ladies Open, she lost in the first round to ninth seed Julia Görges. In Dubai, she was defeated in the first round by Zheng Saisai. In March, she played at Indian Wells, and lost in the second round to ninth seed Aryna Sabalenka. At the Miami Open, Tomljanović upset ninth seed Sabalenka in the second round for her second career-win over a top-ten player. She was defeated in a third-round thriller by 21st seed Anett Kontaveit. As a result, she reached a career-high of No. 39 on 1 April 2019.

Tomljanović started the clay-court season at the Charleston Open. Seeded 14th, she lost in round three to top seed and 2016 champion, Sloane Stephens. Seeded fifth at the İstanbul Cup, she was defeated in the first round by eventual finalist Markéta Vondroušová.

=== 2020: Mixed results, out of top 50 ===
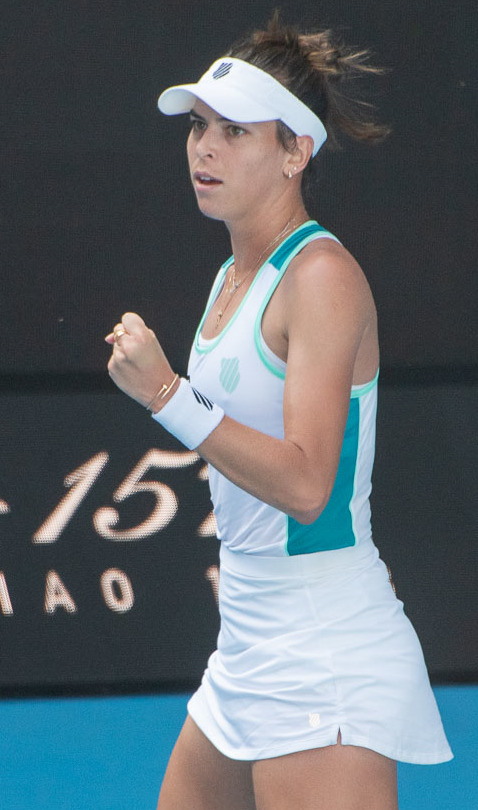
Tomljanović at the 2020 Australian Open

Tomljanović started 2020 at the Brisbane International. She lost in round two to second seed, defending and eventual champion, Karolína Plíšková. Playing at the first edition of the Adelaide International, she was defeated in the second round by second seed Simona Halep. At the Australian Open, she lost in the second round to eventual finalist Garbiñe Muguruza.

In February, Tomljanović played at the St. Petersburg Ladies' Trophy. She was defeated in the second round by Russian qualifier Anastasia Potapova. At the Dubai Championships, she lost in the first round of qualifying to Bethanie Mattek-Sands. In Doha, she was defeated in the second round again by 11th seed Garbiñe Muguruza.

The WTA Tour suspended tournaments from the end of March to July due to the COVID-19 pandemic. When the WTA resumed tournaments in August, Tomljanović competed at the Lexington Challenger where she lost in the first round to fifth seed Yulia Putintseva. She was defeated in the first round of the Cincinnati Open by Veronika Kudermetova. At the US Open, she lost in the first round to 17th seed and 2016 US Open champion, Angelique Kerber.

During the week of September 14, Tomljanović was in Rome playing at the Italian Open. She was defeated in the first round by Marie Bouzková. In Strasbourg, she lost in the first round to qualifier Zhang Shuai. At the French Open, she was defeated in her first-round match by 20th seed Maria Sakkari.

Tomljanović ended the year ranked 68.

=== 2021: First major quarterfinal ===
Tomljanović started the 2021 season at the first edition of the Abu Dhabi Open. She lost in the second round to fourth seed and eventual champion, Aryna Sabalenka. Playing at the first edition of the Gippsland Trophy, she was defeated in the first round by Alizé Cornet. At the Australian Open, she lost in the second round to second seed Simona Halep.

Tomljanović was defeated in the second round at the first edition of the Phillip Island Trophy to seventh seed Anastasia Pavlyuchenkova. In Adelaide, she lost in the first round to qualifier and compatriot, Storm Sanders. At the Miami Open, she was defeated in the second round by second seed Naomi Osaka.

Beginning her clay-court season at the Charleston Open, Tomljanović reached the third round where she lost to Sloane Stephens. Seeded sixth at the first edition of the MUSC Health Women's Open, she was defeated in the second round by Clara Tauson. Coming through qualifying in Madrid, she lost in the first round to Elena Rybakina. Getting past qualifying at the Italian Open, she was defeated in the second round by 2017 French Open champion Jeļena Ostapenko. At the first edition of the Serbia Open, she retired during her second-round match against seventh seed Rebecca Peterson due to a hip injury. At the French Open, she lost in the second round to 31st seed and eventual finalist, Anastasia Pavlyuchenkova.

Starting the grass-court season at the Birmingham Classic, Tomljanović upset top seed Elise Mertens in a three-set battle in the first round. In the second round, she was defeated by qualifier CoCo Vandeweghe. Competing at the Eastbourne International, she lost in the final round of qualifying to Camila Giorgi. At Wimbledon, she reached the quarterfinals of a major for the first time in her career but she was defeated by top seed and eventual champion, Ashleigh Barty.

Representing Australia at the Tokyo Summer Olympics, Tomljanović defeated in her first round match Kazakh Yaroslava Shvedova who retired due to heat illness.

In November, Tomljanović represented again Australia at the Billie Jean King Cup Finals defeating Aliaksandra Sasnovich in the second tie. Australia lost in the semifinals against Switzerland. Tomljanović ended the year ranked 45.

=== 2022: Two major quarterfinals; victory over Williams ===
Tomljanović started her 2022 season at the Adelaide International 1 where she lost to sixth seed Sofia Kenin in her second-round match. She led 6–3, 5–3 and had three match points, but Kenin came back and won the match in three sets. In Sydney, she was defeated in the second round by fifth seed and eventual champion, Paula Badosa. Tomljanović entered the Australian Open ranked world No. 43, and she fell in the first round, losing for the second time in a month to world No. 6, Paula Badosa.

Following the Australian Open, Tomljanović struggled with form, losing in the second round at Indian Wells, to Sorana Cîrstea, and the first round of the Miami Open, to lucky loser Lucia Bronzetti.

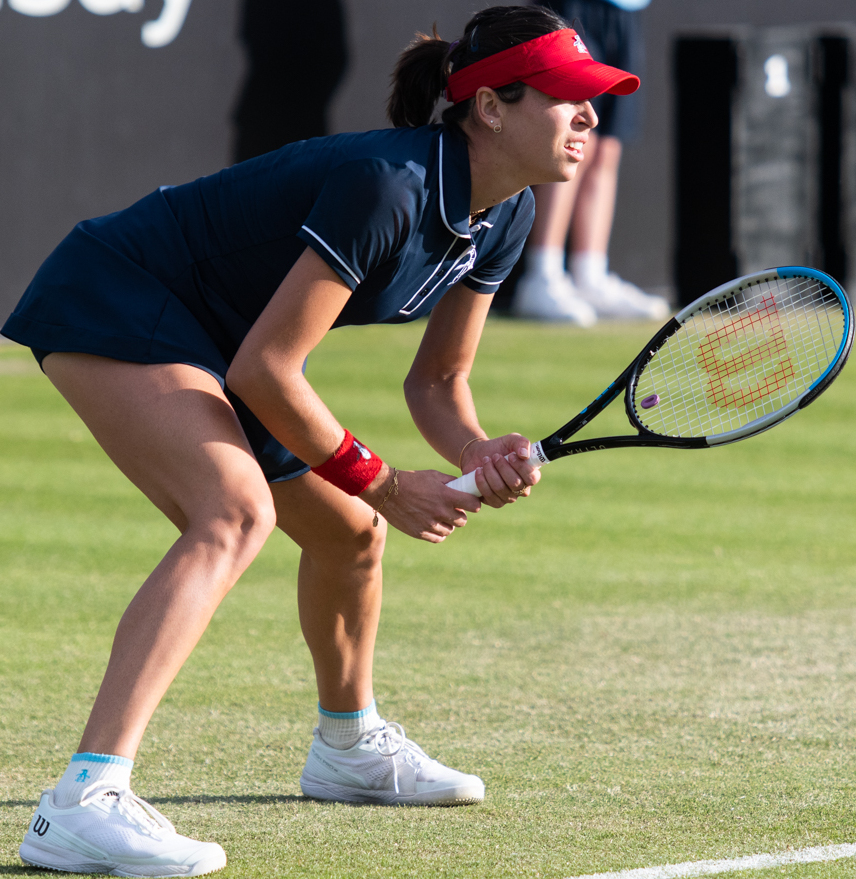
Tomljanović at the 2022 Nottingham Open

Tomljanović opened her clay-court season by making the second round of the Charleston Open where she lost to Irina-Camelia Begu in straight sets. In the lead-up to the French Open, she made the quarterfinals at the Istanbul Open and Morocco Open. At the French Open, Tomljanović defeated Anett Kontaveit in the opening round. Her win over the fifth-ranked Kontaveit marked her biggest win, by ranking, since defeating Radwańska at the same event eight years earlier. She lost to Varvara Gracheva in the second round.

Tomljanović reached back-to-back quarterfinals at the Wimbledon Championships, defeating Jil Teichmann, Catherine Harrison, Barbora Krejčíková, and Alizé Cornet en route, before losing to eventual champion Elena Rybakina.

Tomljanović started on the North American hardcourt swing at the Washington Open, losing to eventual champion Liudmila Samsonova in three sets. She reached the second round of the Canadian Open, before losing in straight sets to world No. 1, Iga Świątek. At the Cincinnati Open, Tomljanović reached her maiden WTA 1000 quarterfinal. After making her way through qualifying, she defeated Taylor Townsend and world No. 4 Paula Badosa, the latter victory marking her third career top-5 win and sixth top-10 win overall – and avenging two losses to Badosa earlier in the year. After defeating Veronika Kudermetova to reach the quarterfinals, Tomljanović lost to Petra Kvitová, in straight sets.

At the US Open, she defeated Karolína Muchová and Evgeniya Rodina, both of whom are in an injury protected ranking, to reach the third round, where she defeated former world No. 1 and 23-time Grand Slam champion, Serena Williams, also on injury protected ranking, in three sets. It was the final professional singles match for Williams, who had announced that she would retire after the tournament. Tomljanović after the match said, "I'm feeling really sorry, just because I love Serena just as much as you guys do. And what she's done for me, for the sport of tennis, is incredible... she is the greatest of all time." Tomljanović defeated Liudmila Samsonova in straight sets to reach her third Grand Slam quarterfinal, and her first at the US Open. She lost her quarterfinal match to world No. 5, Ons Jabeur, in straight sets.

Tomljanovic finished the season at a career-high ranking of No. 33.

=== 2023: First WTA 125 title, career-high ranking ===
Tomljanović was announced to be a part of the Australian 2023 United Cup team, and arrived in Sydney to play the event. Australia was placed in Group D with Great Britain and Spain. Before Australia's tie against British team, Tomljanović announced her withdrawal from her first match against Harriet Dart due to a knee injury. Tomljanović was then scheduled to play Spain's Paula Badosa in the following days, however, she did not participate for the same reason.

Tomljanović then skipped the Adelaide International and travelled to Melbourne to prepare for the upcoming 2023 Australian Open. She was scheduled to play Nadia Podoroska of Argentina in the first round of the event. Two days before the start of the tournament, Tomjlanović again had to withdraw from her home major event due to the same lingering knee issue. Despite the hiatus, she reached a career-high ranking of world No. 32 on 3 April 2023.

Tomljanović returned at the US Open where she beat Panna Udvardy in three sets but had to withdraw due to fatigue before her second-round match with fourth seed Elena Rybakina. Tomljanovic received a wildcard for the WTA 1000 event in Guadalajara, Mexico where she lost in the first round to Taylor Townsend.

In November, she won the WTA 125 tournament in Florianópolis defeating Martina Capurro Taborda in the final. This was her first title at this level.

=== 2024: Minor surgery, first tour final in 5 years and second WTA 125 title ===
Tomljanović made the main draw at the French Open as a wildcard but lost to Australian Open semifinalist Dayana Yastremska, in the first round, after surgery in February to remove fibroids.

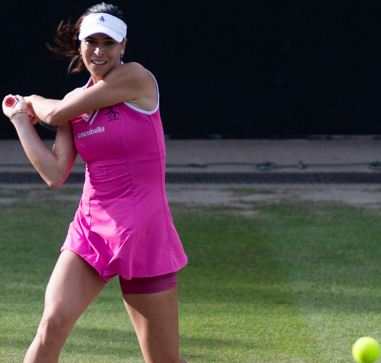
Tomljanović at the 2024 Birmingham Classic

In grass-court season, Tomljanović entered Birmingham Classic by using protected ranking and reached her first tour-level final in more than five years, by beating Anna Blinkova, Zhu Lin, Leylah Fernandez and Anastasia Potapova. However, at her first final in this surface, she lost to Yulia Putintseva in straight sets and dropped to 0–5 career record in WTA Tour singles finals. At Wimbledon, she was defeated in the first round by Jeļena Ostapenko, to whom she lost at the second round of the Australian Open as well, earlier in the season.

Tomljanović represented Australia in both singles and doubles events at the 2024 Summer Olympics. She was eliminated by Coco Gauff in the opening round in the singles where she only was able to win a total of three games. In the doubles competition, she and her partner Olivia Gadecki knocked out by the eventual silver medalists Mirra Andreeva and Diana Shnaider in the first round in a closely contested match, being edged out in the match tie-break 10–6.

After her second-round exit at the US Open against Elise Mertens, Tomljanović suffered first round losses in WTA 1000 tournaments in Beijing and Wuhan during the Asian swing, yet won the title at the Hong Kong 125 Open in between, defeating Clara Tauson in the final. She qualified main draw at the Ningbo Open with victories over Carol Zhao and Ella Seidel, before losing to Yuan Yue in the first round. In Mérida, she defeated Elizabeth Mandlik in straight sets, but later decided to pull out of the tournament without playing her second round match, due to knee injury.

In the BJK Cup finals in November, Australian team led by Tomljanović fell short against Slovakia in their quarterfinal matchup as she was decisively beaten by Rebecca Šramková in the second singles rubber. She finished the year as world No. 85 and climbed up a whopping 454 places in the singles ranking compared to the end of the previous season.

=== 2025: Two WTA Tour semifinals ===
Given a wildcard into the main draw at the Australian Open, Tomljanović defeated Ashlyn Krueger to reach the second round, where she lost to 12th seed Diana Shnaider.

Tomljanović reached the semifinals at the ATX Open with wins over seventh seed Katie Volynets, Jodie Burrage, and qualifier Ena Shibahara, before losing in the last four to top seed and eventual champion, Jessica Pegula.

At the Charleston Open in April, Tomljanović defeated Kyoka Okamura, and 16th seed Peyton Stearns, before losing to top seed and eventual champion, Jessica Pegula, in the third round. In May, she qualified for the Italian Open but lost in the first round to Varvara Gracheva.

Tomljanović made the semifinals at the Morocco Open but retired due to illness against the fellow Australian and eventual champion, Maya Joint, after dropping the first set. Three days later, she beat her compatriot in a rematch in the first round of the French Open, but lost to fourth seed and the 2024 finalist, Jasmine Paolini, in the next round. After three consecutive second-round appearances in majors, Tomljanović suffered a first-round exit in Wimbledon at the hands of Anastasia Pavlyuchenkova.

In October at the Ningbo Open, Tomljanović qualified for the main draw and defeated fifth seed Clara Tauson and fellow qualifier Zeynep Sönmez to make it through to the quarterfinals, at which point her run was ended by third seed and eventual champion, Elena Rybakina.

=== 2026: Rosmalen semifinal ===
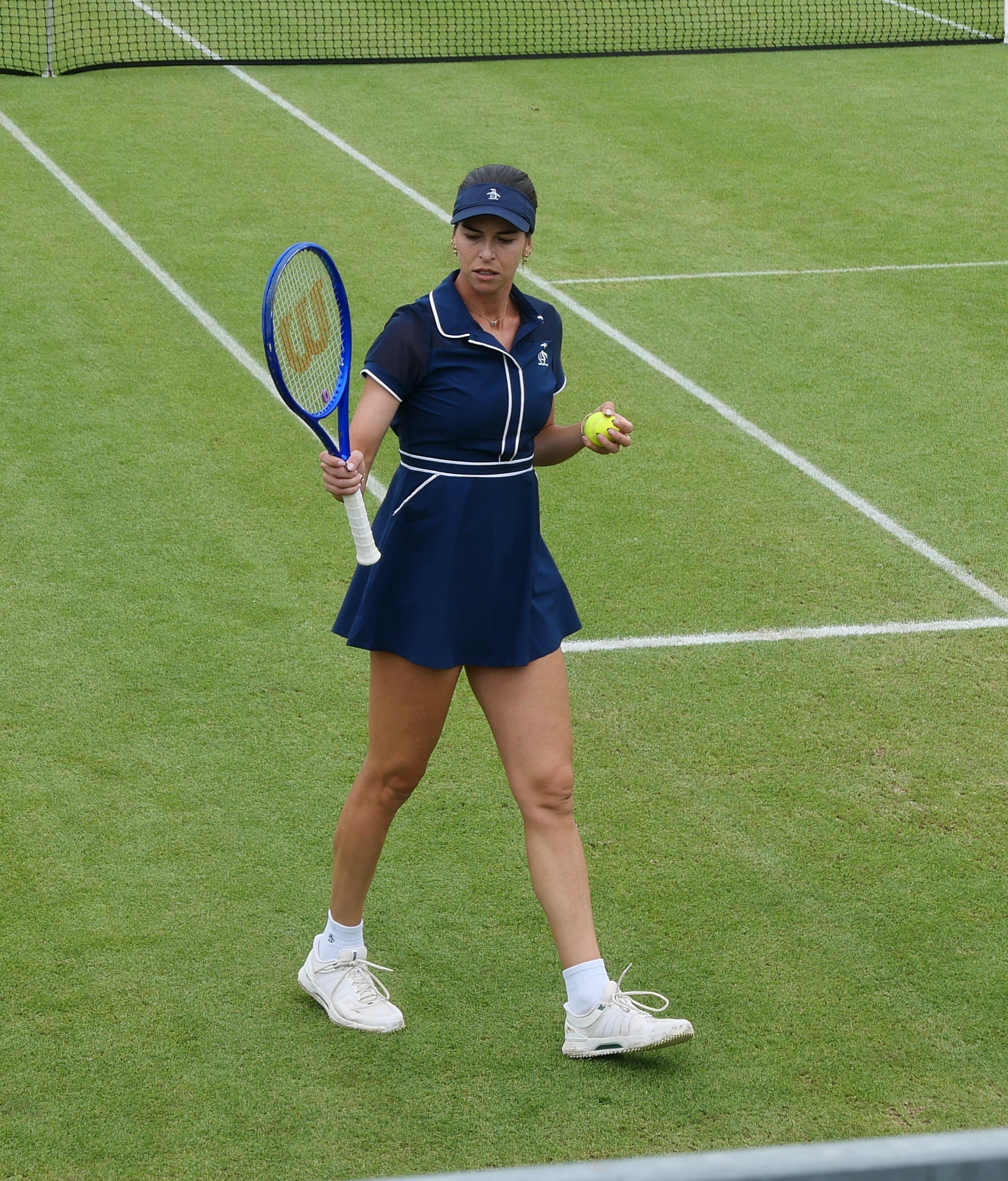
Tomljanović at the 2026 Libéma Open

At the ATX Open, Tomljanović reached the quarterfinals with wins over wildcard entrant Venus Williams and second seed Iva Jovic, before losing to fellow Australian Kimberly Birrell in the last eight. The following week at the WTA 1000 tournament in Indian Wells, she defeated Elena-Gabriela Ruse and 30th seed Wang Xinyu to reach the third round, in which she lost to seventh seed Jasmine Paolini, in three sets.

In June at the Rosmalen Open, Tomljanović overcame Jéssica Bouzas Maneiro, Dayana Yastremska and Caty McNally to make it through to the semifinals, where her run was ended by qualifier Robin Montgomery.

== Apparel and equipment ==
Tomljanović wears Original Penguin clothing, and uses Wilson racquets. She has previously been sponsored by Nike and K-Swiss for clothing and apparel.

== World TeamTennis ==
Tomljanovic made her World TeamTennis debut with the Vegas Rollers during the 2020 WTT season played at The Greenbrier.

=== Television and film ===
Tomljanović appears in the tennis docuseries Break Point, which premiered on Netflix on January 13, 2023.

== Performance timelines ==
Key
W	F	SF	QF	#R	RR	Q#	P#	DNQ	A	Z#	PO	G	S	B	NMS	NTI	P	NH

(W) winner; (F) finalist; (SF) semifinalist; (QF) quarterfinalist; (#R) rounds 4, 3, 2, 1; (RR) round-robin stage; (Q#) qualification round; (P#) preliminary round; (DNQ) did not qualify; (A) absent; (Z#) Davis/Fed Cup Zonal Group (with number indication) or (PO) play-off; (G) gold, (S) silver or (B) bronze Olympic/Paralympic medal; (NMS) not a Masters tournament; (NTI) not a Tier I tournament; (P) postponed; (NH) not held; (SR) strike rate (events won / competed); (W–L) win–loss record.
To avoid confusion and double counting, these charts are updated at the conclusion of a tournament or when the player's participation has ended.

Only main-draw results in WTA Tour, Grand Slam tournaments, Billie Jean King Cup, United Cup, Hopman Cup and Olympic Games are included in win–loss records.

Note: Tomljanović played under Croatian flag until 2018

=== Singles ===
Current through the 2026 Wimbledon.

Tournament	2009	2010	2011	2012	2013	2014	2015	2016	2017	2018	2019	2020	2021	2022	2023	2024	2025	2026	SR	W–L	Win %
Grand Slam tournaments
Australian Open	A	A	Q2	A	A	2R	2R	1R	A	1R	1R	2R	2R	1R	A	2R	2R	2R	0 / 11	7–11	39%
French Open	A	Q1	Q1	Q1	Q1	4R	2R	A	1R	1R	1R	1R	2R	2R	A	1R	2R	1R	0 / 11	7–11	39%
Wimbledon	A	Q3	Q1	Q1	1R	1R	2R	A	A	1R	2R	NH	QF	QF	A	1R	1R	1R	0 / 10	10–10	50%
US Open	A	Q2	Q2	A	2R	1R	1R	A	2R	2R	2R	1R	3R	QF	2R (Note: Withdrew during the tournament. Not counted as a loss.)	2R	1R		0 / 12	12–11	52%
Win–loss	0–0	0–0	0–0	0–0	1–2	4–4	3–4	0–1	1–2	1–4	2–4	1–3	8–4	9–4	1–0	2–4	2–4	1–3	0 / 44	36–43	46%
National representation
Summer Olympics	NH			A	NH			A	NH				2R	NH		1R	NH		0 / 2	1–2	33%
Billie Jean King Cup (Note: Formerly known as Fed Cup until 2020.)	A	POZ1	POZ1	A	A	A	A	A	A	A	F	SF (Note: Edition is split into the two years due to COVID-19.)		F	RR	QF	A		0 / 5	7–9	44%
WTA 1000 tournaments
Qatar Open (Note: The first Premier 5 event of the year has switched back and forth between the Dubai Tennis Championships and the Qatar Ladies Open since 2009. Dubai was classified as a Premier 5 event from 2009 to 2011 before being succeeded by Doha for the 2012–2014 period. In 2015, Dubai regained its Premier 5 status while Doha was demoted to Premier status. The Premier 5 tournaments were reclassified as WTA 1000 tournaments in 2021.)	NMS			A	A	A	NMS	A	NMS	A	NMS	2R	NMS	1R	NMS	A	A	A	0 / 2	1–2	33%
Dubai Open	A	A	A	NMS			A	NMS	A	NMS	1R	NMS	A	NMS	A	A	A	A	0 / 1	0–1	0%
Indian Wells Open	1R	1R	A	A	Q2	2R	1R	A	1R	Q2	2R	NH	4R	2R	A	A	1R	3R	0 / 10	8–10	44%
Miami Open	A	1R	1R	A	4R	3R	1R	A	3R	2R	3R	NH	2R	1R	A	A	1R	2R	0 / 12	12–12	50%
Madrid Open	A	A	A	A	A	Q1	2R	A	A	A	1R	NH	1R	1R	A	A	1R	1R	0 / 6	1–6	14%
Italian Open	A	A	A	A	A	Q2	Q2	A	A	1R	2R	1R	2R	2R	A	A	1R	1R	0 / 7	3–7	30%
Canadian Open	A	Q1	A	A	A	1R	Q2	A	A	A	1R	NH	1R	2R	A	A	1R		0 / 5	1–5	17%
Cincinnati Open	A	A	A	A	A	Q1	A	A	A	2R	A	1R	A	QF	A	1R	2R		0 / 5	5–5	50%
Guadalajara Open	NH													2R	1R	NMS	A		0 / 2	1–2	33%
China Open	A	A	A	A	A	Q2	Q2	A	A	Q2	2R	NH			A	1R	2R		0 / 3	2–3	40%
Pan Pacific / Wuhan Open (Note: In 2014, the Pan Pacific Open was downgraded to a Premier event and replaced by the Wuhan Open. The Premier 5 tournaments were reclassified as WTA 1000 tournaments in 2021.)	A	A	A	A	A	Q1	1R	A	A	A	1R	NH				1R	1R		0 / 4	0–4	0%
Win–loss	0–1	0–2	0–1	0–0	3–1	3–3	1–4	0–0	2–2	2–3	5–8	1–3	5–5	7–8	0–1	0–3	2–8	3–4	0 / 57	34–57	37%
Career statistics
	2009	2010	2011	2012	2013	2014	2015	2016	2017	2018	2019	2020	2021	2022	2023	2024	2025	2026	SR	W–L	Win %
Tournaments	1	3	5	1	7	20	21	2	9	19	28	11	22	24	3	17	22	15	Career total: 225		
Titles	0	0	0	0	0	0	0	0	0	0	0	0	0	0	0	0	0	0	Career total: 0		
Finals	0	0	0	0	0	0	1	0	0	2	1	0	0	0	0	1	0	0	Career total: 5		
Overall win–loss	0–1	3–4	2–7	0–1	7–7	17–20	18–21	0–2	5–9	22–19	27–29	5–11	25–23	30–26	1–2	10–19	17-22	15–17	0 / 343	444–343	56%
Win %	0%	43%	22%	0%	50%	46%	46%	0%	36%	54%	48%	31%	52%	54%	33%	34%	44%	68%	46%		
Year-end ranking (Note: 2008: WTA Ranking–973.)	353	157	145	453	78	63	66	930	151	43	51	68	45	33	549	109	80		$7,695,813		

=== Doubles ===
Current through the 2025 Australian Open.

Tournament	2011	2012	2013	2014	2015	2016	2017	2018	2019	2020	2021	2022	2023	2024	2025	SR	W–L	Win %
Grand Slam tournaments
Australian Open	A	A	A	QF	2R	2R	A	1R	1R	1R	1R	A	A	2R	A	0 / 8	5–8	38%
French Open	A	A	A	1R	1R	A	2R	1R	1R	2R	2R	3R	A	1R	A	0 / 9	5–9	36%
Wimbledon	A	A	A	1R	3R	A	A	1R	2R	NH	1R	1R	A	A	1R	0 / 7	3–7	30%
US Open	A	A	A	3R	1R	A	1R	3R	2R	A	2R	1R	A	1R	A	0 / 8	6–8	43%
Win–loss	0–0	0–0	0–0	5–4	3–4	1–1	1–2	2–4	2–4	1–2	2–4	2–3	0–0	1–3	0–1	0 / 32	20–32	38%
WTA 1000 tournaments
Dubai / Qatar Open	A	A	A	A	A	A	A	A	2R	A	A	A	A	A	A	0 / 1	1–1	50%
Indian Wells Open	A	A	A	A	A	A	A	A	A	NH	1R	2R	A	A		0 / 2	1–2	33%
Miami Open	1R	A	1R	A	1R	A	1R	A	A	NH	1R	A	A	A		0 / 5	0–5	0%
Madrid Open	A	A	A	A	1R	A	A	A	A	NH	A	QF	A	A		0 / 2	2–2	50%
Italian Open	A	A	A	A	A	A	A	A	A	A	A	A	A	A		0 / 0	0–0	–
Canadian Open	A	A	A	A	1R	A	A	A	A	NH	A	A	A	A		0 / 1	0–1	0%
Cincinnati Open	A	A	A	A	A	A	A	1R	A	A	A	A	A	A		0 / 1	0–1	0%
Pan Pacific / Wuhan Open	A	A	A	2R	2R	A	A	A	1R	NH			A	A		0 / 3	2–3	40%
China Open	A	A	A	QF	A	A	A	1R	A	NH			A	A		0 / 2	2–2	50%
Guadalajara Open	NMS/NH											A	A	A		0 / 0	0–0	–
Career statistics
Tournaments	1	1	4	14	15	1	3	9	12	4	9	5	0	6	3	Career total: 87		
Overall win–loss	0–1	0–1	2–4	15–14	8–14	1–1	1–3	4–9	4–12	3–3	5–9	5–5	0–0	1–6	1–3	0 / 87	50–87	36%
Year-end ranking	275	360	299	48	92	385	370	140	159	127	141	136	N/A	444				

== WTA Tour finals ==
=== Singles: 5 (5 runner-ups) ===
Legend WTA 1000 WTA 500 WTA 250 (0–5)	Finals by surface Hard (0–3) Clay (0–1) Grass (0–1)

Result	W–L	Date	Tournament	Tier	Surface	Opponent	Score
Loss	0–1	Feb 2015	Pattaya Open, Thailand	International (Note: The WTA International tournaments were reclassified as WTA 250 tournaments in 2021.)	Hard	(Slovakia) Daniela Hantuchová	6–3, 3–6, 4–6
Loss	0–2	May 2018	Rabat Grand Prix, Morocco	International	Clay	(Belgium) Elise Mertens	2–6, 6–7^{(4–7)}
Loss	0–3	Sep 2018	Korea Open, South Korea	International	Hard	(Netherlands) Kiki Bertens	6–7^{(2–7)}, 6–4, 2–6
Loss	0–4	Feb 2019	Hua Hin Championships, Thailand	International	Hard	(Ukraine) Dayana Yastremska	2–6, 6–2, 6–7^{(3–7)}
Los	0–5	Jun 2024	Birmingham Classic, United Kingdom	WTA 250	Grass	(Kazakhstan) Yulia Putintseva	1–6, 6–7^{(8–10)}

== WTA 125 finals ==
=== Singles: 2 (2 titles) ===
Result	W–L	Date	Tournament	Surface	Opponent	Score
Win	1–0	Nov 2023	Florianópolis Open, Brazil	Clay	(Argentina) Martina Capurro Taborda	6–1, 7–5
Win	2–0	Oct 2024	Hong Kong 125 Open, China SAR	Hard	(Denmark) Clara Tauson	4–6, 6–4, 6–4

== ITF Circuit finals ==
=== Singles: 14 (4 titles, 10 runner-ups) ===
Legend
$100,000 tournaments (0–2)
$80,000 tournaments (0–1)
$50/60,000 tournaments (1–2)
$25,000 tournaments (3–5)

Result	W–L	Date	Tournament	Tier	Surface	Opponent	Score
Loss	0–1	Nov 2009	ITF Puebla, Mexico	25,000	Hard	(United Kingdom) Naomi Broady	6–7^{(4–7)}, 3–6
Win	1–1	Jan 2010	ITF Plantation, United States	25,000	Clay	(Sweden) Johanna Larsson	6–3, 6–3
Loss	1–2	Apr 2010	ITF Pelham, US	25,000	Clay	(Romania) Edina Gallovits	2–6, 0–6
Loss	1–3	May 2010	Prague Open, Czech Rep.	50,000	Clay	(Czech Republic) Lucie Hradecká	1–6, 6–7^{(4–7)}
Win	2–3	Mar 2011	ITF Clearwater, US	25,000	Hard	(Bulgaria) Sesil Karatantcheva	7–6^{(7–3)}, 6–3
Loss	2–4	Apr 2011	ITF Jackson, US	25,000	Clay	(New Zealand) Marina Erakovic	1–6, 2–6
Win	3–4	May 2011	Grado Tennis Cup, Italy	25,000	Clay	(Romania) Alexandra Ignatik	6–2, 6–4
Loss	3–5	Jan 2013	Palm Harbor Open, US	25,000	Clay	(Slovenia) Tadeja Majerič	2–6, 3–6
Loss	3–6	Feb 2013	Midland Tennis Classic, US	100,000	Hard (i)	(United States) Lauren Davis	3–6, 6–2, 6–7^{(2–7)}
Win	4–6	Apr 2013	Dothan Pro Classic, US	50,000	Clay	(China) Zhang Shuai	2–6, 6–4, 6–3
Loss	4–7	Oct 2013	Tennis Classic of Macon, US	25,000	Hard	(Georgia (country)) Anna Tatishvili	2–6, 6–1, 5–7
Loss	4–8	Jul 2017	Sacramento Challenger, US	60,000	Hard	(United States) Amanda Anisimova	w/o
Loss	4–9	Nov 2017	Waco Showdown, US	80,000	Hard	(United States) Taylor Townsend	3–6, 6–2, 2–6
Loss	4–10	Dec 2017	Dubai Tennis Challenge, United Arab Emirates	100,000+H	Hard	(Switzerland) Belinda Bencic	4–6, ret.

=== Doubles: 4 (3 titles, 1 runner-up) ===
Legend
$75,000 tournaments (1–0)
$50,000 tournaments (1–1)
$25,000 tournaments (1–0)

Result	W–L	Date	Tournament	Tier	Surface	Partner	Opponents	Score
Win	1–0	May 2009	Zagreb Open, Croatia	50,000	Clay	(Croatia) Petra Martić	(Belarus) Ksenia Milevskaya (Russia) Anastasia Pivovarova	6–3, 6–7^{(4)}, [10–5]
Loss	1–1	Oct 2011	Kansas City Classic, United States	50,000	Hard	(United States) Jamie Hampton	(Croatia) Maria Abramović (Czech Republic) Eva Hrdinová	2–6, 6–2, 6–4
Win	2–1	Oct 2011	ITF Bayamón, Puerto Rico	25,000	Hard	(South Africa) Chanel Simmonds	(United States) Victoria Duval (United States) Alexandra Kiick	6–3, 6–1
Win	3–1	Nov 2011	Phoenix Tennis Classic, US	75,000	Hard	(United States) Jamie Hampton	(United States) Maria Sanchez (United States) Yasmin Schnack	3–6, 6–3, 6–3

== Junior Grand Slam tournament finals ==
=== Girls' doubles: 1 (title) ===
Result	Year	Tournament	Surface	Partner	Opponents	Score
Win	2009	Australian Open	Hard	(United States) Christina McHale	(Serbia) Aleksandra Krunić (Poland) Sandra Zaniewska	6–1, 2–6, [10–4]

== WTA Tour career earnings ==
As of 21 July 2025

Year	Grand Slam titles	WTA titles	Total titles	Earnings ($)	Money list rank
2014	0	0	0	514,541	55
2015	0	0	0	454,141	63
2016	0	0	0	46,771	258
2017	0	0	0	240,764	134
2018	0	0	0	495,406	74
2019	0	0	0	749,597	53
2020	0	0	0	346,067	64
2021	0	0	0	1,065,535	30
2022	0	0	0	1,372,565	24
2023	0	0	0	137,461	234
2024	0	0	0	693,903	83
2025	0	0	0	454,789	94
Career	0	0	0	6,952,298	113

== Head-to-head records ==
=== Record against top 10 players ===
She has a 6–33 (15%) record against players who were, at the time the match was played, ranked in the top 10.

#	Opponent	Rk	Event	Surface	Rd	Score	Rank
2014
1.	(Poland) Agnieszka Radwańska	No. 3	French Open, France	Clay	3R	6–4, 6–4	72
2019
2.	(Belarus) Aryna Sabalenka	No. 9	Miami Open, US	Hard	2R	6–3, 6–4	40
3.	(Netherlands) Kiki Bertens	No. 8	Zhengzhou Open, China	Hard	2R	6–4, 7–6^{(7–1)}	46
2021
4.	(Spain) Garbiñe Muguruza	No. 6	Indian Wells Open, US	Hard	2R	6–3, 1–6, 6–3	47
2022
5.	(Estonia) Anett Kontaveit	No. 5	French Open, France	Clay	1R	7–6^{(7–5)}, 7–5	42
6.	(Spain) Paula Badosa	No. 4	Cincinnati Open, US	Hard	2R	6–7^{(3–7)}, 6–0, 6–2	63

*As of 29 May 2025
