= 2025 Internazionali di Tennis Città di Rovereto – Singles =

Singles
- 2025 Internazionali di Tennis Città di Rovereto

Final
- Champion: Oksana Selekhmeteva
- Runner-up: (Italy) Lucrezia Stefanini
- Score: 6–1, 6–1

Details
- Draw: 32 (4 WC)
- Seeds: 8

Events
Singles	Doubles
Internazionali di Tennis Città di Rovereto	· 2026 →

Oksana Selekhmeteva won the title, after defeating Lucrezia Stefanini in the final, 6–1, 6–1.

This was the first edition of the tournament.

== Seeds ==
1. (Latvia) Darja Semeņistaja (quarterfinals)
2. Oksana Selekhmeteva (champion)
3. (Italy) Lucrezia Stefanini (final)
4. (Italy) Nuria Brancaccio (first round)
5. (Uzbekistan) Maria Timofeeva (first round)
6. (Belgium) Sofia Costoulas (semifinals)
7. (Poland) Linda Klimovičová (second round)
8. (Ukraine) Daria Snigur (first round)

== Draw ==
=== Key ===
- Q = Qualifier
- WC = Wild card
- LL = Lucky loser
- Alt = Alternate
- ITF = ITF entry
- PR = Protected ranking
- SR = Special ranking
- SE = Special exempt
- JE = Junior exempt
- JR = Junior Accelerator Programme entrant
- CO = College Accelerator Programme entrant
- NG = Next Gen Accelerator Program entrant
- w/o = Walkover
- r = Retired
- d = Defaulted

=== Finals ===
Semifinals
6	(Belgium) Sofia Costoulas	3	5
3	(Italy) Lucrezia Stefanini	6	7
(Switzerland) Susan Bandecchi	6^{1}	2
2	Oksana Selekhmeteva	7^{7}	6

Final
3	(Italy) Lucrezia Stefanini	1	1
2	Oksana Selekhmeteva	6	6

=== Top half ===
First round
1	(Latvia) D Semeņistaja	7^{7}	6
WC	(Italy) N Basiletti	6^{2}	2
(Italy) A Zantedeschi	3	6^{2}
Q	(Germany) N Noha Akugue	6	7^{7}
(Switzerland) C Naef	4	3
(Croatia) J Fett	6	6
Q	(Slovakia) R Zelníčková	2	4
6	(Belgium) S Costoulas	6	6
3	(Italy) L Stefanini	5	5
(Ukraine) A Sobolieva	7	3^{r}
(Spain) M Bassols Ribera	6	6
WC	(Italy) E Visentin	1	1
(Slovenia) D Jakupović	0	0
(Czech Republic) G Knutson	6	6
Q	(Spain) E Guerrero Álvarez	4	7^{7}	6
8	(Ukraine) D Snigur	6	6^{5}	3

Second round
1	(Latvia) D Semeņistaja	6	4	6
Q	(Germany) N Noha Akugue	4	6	1
(Croatia) J Fett	4	6	3
6	(Belgium) S Costoulas	6	3	6
3	(Italy) L Stefanini	1	6	7
(Spain) M Bassols Ribera	6	3	5
(Czech Republic) G Knutson	4	6	6
Q	(Spain) E Guerrero Álvarez	6	1	1

Quarterfinals
1	(Latvia) D Semeņistaja	6	3	3
6	(Belgium) S Costoulas	4	6	6
3	(Italy) L Stefanini	6	6
(Czech Republic) G Knutson	3	2

Semifinals
6	(Belgium) S Costoulas	3	5
3	(Italy) L Stefanini	6	7

=== Bottom half ===
First round
5	(Uzbekistan) M Timofeeva	3	3
WC	(Italy) TC Grant	6	6
Q	A Ibragimova	4	4
(Switzerland) S Bandecchi	6	6
(Spain) Á Fita Boluda	0	6^{5}
(Spain) A Bolsova	6	7^{7}
(North Macedonia) L Gjorcheska	6	6
4	(Italy) N Brancaccio	4	3
7	(Poland) L Klimovičová	6	6
(Hungary) A Tóth	1	4
(Germany) A-L Friedsam	2	7^{7}	6
(Spain) A Lázaro García	6	6^{4}	3
WC	(Italy) S De Stefano	3	5
(Italy) S Ambrosio	6	7
(Czech Republic) B Palicová	3	3
2	O Selekhmeteva	6	6

Second round
WC	(Italy) TC Grant	3	0
(Switzerland) S Bandecchi	6	6
(Spain) A Bolsova	1	7^{7}	6
(North Macedonia) L Gjorcheska	6	6^{2}	1
7	(Poland) L Klimovičová	6	1	2
(Germany) A-L Friedsam	4	6	6
(Italy) S Ambrosio	3	6	2
2	O Selekhmeteva	6	3	6

Quarterfinals
(Switzerland) S Bandecchi	4	7	6
(Spain) A Bolsova	6	5	3
(Germany) A-L Friedsam	6	2	3
2	O Selekhmeteva	3	6	6

Semifinals
(Switzerland) S Bandecchi	6^{1}	2
2	O Selekhmeteva	7^{7}	6

== Qualifying ==
=== Seeds ===
1. (Spain) Eva Guerrero Álvarez (qualified)
2. (Germany) Noma Noha Akugue (qualified)
3. (Georgia (country)) Sofia Shapatava (qualifying competition)
4. (Italy) Anastasia Abbagnato (qualifying competition)
5. Alevtina Ibragimova (qualified)
6. (Poland) Urszula Radwańska (first round)
7. Sofya Lansere (qualifying competition)
8. (Slovakia) Radka Zelníčková (qualified)

=== Qualifiers ===
1. (Spain) Eva Guerrero Álvarez
2. (Germany) Noma Noha Akugue
3. (Slovakia) Radka Zelníčková
4. Alevtina Ibragimova

=== Draw ===
==== First qualifier ====
First round
1	(Spain) Eva Guerrero Álvarez	0	6	6
(Czech Republic) Aneta Laboutková	6	3	2
(Ukraine) Maryna Kolb	2	2
7	Sofya Lansere	6	6

Qualifying competition
1	(Spain) Eva Guerrero Álvarez	6	6
7	Sofya Lansere	1	0

==== Second qualifier ====
First round
2	(Germany) Noma Noha Akugue	6	6
(Germany) Yana Morderger	2	2
WC	(Ukraine) Nadiia Kolb	3	6	6
6	(Poland) Urszula Radwańska	6	4	4

Qualifying competition
2	(Germany) Noma Noha Akugue	6	6
WC	(Ukraine) Nadiia Kolb	0	4

==== Third qualifier ====
First round
3	(Georgia (country)) Sofia Shapatava	7	7
(Germany) Tayisiya Morderger	5	5
(Italy) Deborah Chiesa	6	6^{5}	3
8	(Slovakia) Radka Zelníčková	1	7^{7}	6

Qualifying competition
3	(Georgia (country)) Sofia Shapatava	5	2
8	(Slovakia) Radka Zelníčková	7	6

==== Fourth qualifier ====
First round
4	(Italy) Anastasia Abbagnato	6	6
(Slovenia) Nika Radišić	4	3
WC	(Italy) Ana Tamindžić	0	0
5	Alevtina Ibragimova	6	6

Qualifying competition
4	(Italy) Anastasia Abbagnato	4	6	3
5	Alevtina Ibragimova	6	4	6
