= 2025 Internazionali di Tennis Città di Rovereto =

- Date: 20–26 October 2025
- Edition: 1st
- Category: WTA 125
- Prize money: $115,000
- Surface: Hard (indoor)
- Location: Rovereto, Italy

Champions

Singles
- Oksana Selekhmeteva

Doubles
- (Czech Republic) Jesika Malečková / (Czech Republic) Miriam Škoch
- Internazionali di Tennis Città di Rovereto

The 2025 Rovereto Open Città Della Pace was a professional tennis tournament played on outdoor hard courts. It was the first edition of the tournament for the women and part of the 2025 WTA 125 tournaments. It took place in Rovereto, Italy between 20 and 26 October 2025. The tournament has already staged two editions as an ATP Challenger Tour event.

== Singles main-draw entrants ==
=== Seeds ===
Country	Player	Rank^{1}	Seed
LAT	Darja Semeņistaja	101	1
	Oksana Selekhmeteva	112	2
ITA	Lucrezia Stefanini	152	3
ITA	Nuria Brancaccio	154	4
UZB	Maria Timofeeva	164	5
BEL	Sofia Costoulas	165	6
POL	Linda Klimovičová	168	7
UKR	Daria Snigur	174	8

- ^{1} Rankings are as of 13 October 2025.

=== Other entrants ===
The following players received wildcards into the singles main draw:

- (Italy) Noemi Basiletti
- (Italy) Samira De Stefano
- (Italy) Tyra Caterina Grant
- (Italy) Elisa Visentin

The following players received entry from the qualifying draw:

- (Spain) Eva Guerrero Álvarez
- (Germany) Noma Noha Akugue
- (Slovakia) Radka Zelníčková
- Alevtina Ibragimova

=== Withdrawals ===
Before the tournament

- (Serbia) Lola Radivojević → replaced by (Slovenia) Dalila Jakupović
- (United Kingdom) Heather Watson → replaced by (Spain) Aliona Bolsova

== Doubles entrants ==
=== Seeds ===
Country	Player	Country	Player	Rank	Seed
CZE	Jesika Malečková	CZE	Miriam Škoch	150	1
ESP	Aliona Bolsova	ESP	Yvonne Cavallé Reimers	229	2
SLO	Dalila Jakupović	SLO	Nika Radišić	255	3
FRA	Estelle Cascino	GER	Noma Noha Akugue	369	4

- Rankings as of 13 October 2025.

=== Other entrants ===
The following pair received a wildcard into the doubles main draw:

- (Italy) Noemi Maines / (Italy) Elisa Visentin

== Champions ==
=== Singles ===
- Oksana Selekhmeteva def. (Italy) Lucrezia Stefanini 6–1, 6–1

=== Doubles ===
- (Czech Republic) Jesika Malečková / (Czech Republic) Miriam Škoch def. (Italy) Silvia Ambrosio / (Italy) Aurora Zantedeschi 6–0, 4–6, [10–4]
