= 2025 Internazionali di Tennis Città di Rovereto – Doubles =

Doubles
- 2025 Internazionali di Tennis Città di Rovereto

Final
- Champions: (Czech Republic) Jesika Malečková (Czech Republic) Miriam Škoch
- Runners-up: (Italy) Silvia Ambrosio (Italy) Aurora Zantedeschi
- Score: 6–0, 4–6, [10–4]

Details
- Draw: 32 (4 WC)
- Seeds: 8

Events
Singles	Doubles
Internazionali di Tennis Città di Rovereto	· 2026 →

Jesika Malečková and Miriam Škoch won the title, defeating Silvia Ambrosio and Aurora Zantedeschi in the final, 6–0, 4–6, [10–4].

This was the first edition of the tournament.

== Seeds ==
1. (Czech Republic) Jesika Malečková / (Czech Republic) Miriam Škoch (champions)
2. (Spain) Aliona Bolsova / (Spain) Yvonne Cavallé Reimers (semifinals)
3. (Slovenia) Dalila Jakupović / (Slovenia) Nika Radišić (quarterfinals)
4. (France) Estelle Cascino / (Germany) Noma Noha Akugue (quarterfinals)

== Draw ==
Key

- Q = Qualifier
- WC = Wild card
- LL = Lucky loser
- Alt = Alternate
- ITF = ITF entry
- PR = Protected ranking
- SR = Special ranking
- SE = Special exempt
- JE = Junior exempt
- JR = Junior Accelerator Programme entrant
- CO = College Accelerator Programme entrant
- NG = Next Gen Accelerator Program entrant
- w/o = Walkover
- r = Retired
- d = Defaulted

=== Draw ===
First round
1	(Czech Republic) J Malečková (Czech Republic) M Škoch	4	6	[10]
(Czech Republic) A Laboutková (Hungary) A Nagy	6	3	[8]
(Ukraine) A Sobolieva (Hungary) A Tóth	1	3
(Czech Republic) M Bayerlová (Slovakia) R Zelníčková	6	6
4	(France) E Cascino (Germany) N Noha Akugue	6	6
WC	(Italy) N Maines (Italy) E Visentin	3	0
(Italy) A Abbagnato (Italy) S De Stefano	6	1	[12]
(Italy) D Chiesa (Italy) A Moratelli	3	6	[10]
(Italy) S Ambrosio (Italy) A Zantedeschi	6	6
(Germany) T Morderger (Germany) Y Morderger	0	2
A Ibragimova; S Lansere	3	6	[4]
3	(Slovenia) D Jakupović (Slovenia) N Radišić	6	3	[10]
(Ukraine) M Kolb (Ukraine) N Kolb	4	1
(Switzerland) S Bandecchi (United Kingdom) M Brooks	6	6
(United Kingdom) S Anane (Georgia (country)) S Shapatava	0	2
2	(Spain) A Bolsova (Spain) Y Cavallé Reimers	6	6

Quarterfinals
1	(Czech Republic) J Malečková (Czech Republic) M Škoch	6	6
(Czech Republic) M Bayerlová (Slovakia) R Zelníčková	4	4
4	(France) E Cascino (Germany) N Noha Akugue	3	3
(Italy) A Abbagnato (Italy) S De Stefano	6	6
(Italy) S Ambrosio (Italy) A Zantedeschi	7^{7}	7
3	(Slovenia) D Jakupović (Slovenia) N Radišić	6^{5}	5
(Switzerland) S Bandecchi (United Kingdom) M Brooks	3	3
2	(Spain) A Bolsova (Spain) Y Cavallé Reimers	6	6

Semifinals
1	(Czech Republic) J Malečková (Czech Republic) M Škoch	7	6
(Italy) A Abbagnato (Italy) S De Stefano	5	2
(Italy) S Ambrosio (Italy) A Zantedeschi	6	6
2	(Spain) A Bolsova (Spain) Y Cavallé Reimers	4	3

Final
1	(Czech Republic) J Malečková (Czech Republic) M Škoch	6	4	[10]
(Italy) S Ambrosio (Italy) A Zantedeschi	0	6	[4]
