= 2023 Internazionali di Tennis Città di Rovereto – Doubles =

Doubles
- 2023 Internazionali di Tennis Città di Rovereto

Final
- Champions: (Romania) Victor Vlad Cornea (Croatia) Franko Škugor
- Runners-up: (Ukraine) Vladyslav Manafov (Ukraine) Oleg Prihodko
- Score: 6–7^{(3–7)}, 6–2, [10–4]

Events
Singles	Doubles
Internazionali di Tennis Città di Rovereto	· 2024 →

This was the first edition of the tournament.

Victor Vlad Cornea and Franko Škugor won the title after defeating Vladyslav Manafov and Oleg Prihodko 6–7^{(3–7)}, 6–2, [10–4] in the final.

== Seeds ==
1. (Ukraine) Vladyslav Manafov / (Ukraine) Oleg Prihodko (final)
2. (Romania) Victor Vlad Cornea / (Croatia) Franko Škugor (champions)
3. (Czech Republic) Marek Gengel / (Czech Republic) Zdeněk Kolář (semifinals)
4. (France) Théo Arribagé / (Germany) Constantin Frantzen (quarterfinals)

== Draw ==
=== Key ===
- Q = Qualifier
- WC = Wild card
- LL = Lucky loser
- Alt = Alternate
- SE = Special exempt
- PR = Protected ranking
- ITF = ITF entry
- JE = Junior exempt
- w/o = Walkover
- r = Retired
- d = Defaulted
- SR = Special ranking

First round
1	(Ukraine) V Manafov (Ukraine) O Prihodko	7	4	[10]
WC	(Latvia) M Lībietis (Switzerland) L Margaroli	5	6	[5]
(Peru) A Merino (Switzerland) J Paul	4	6	[10]
(Uzbekistan) S Fayziev (Greece) M Kalovelonis	6	3	[5]
3	(Czech Republic) M Gengel (Czech Republic) Z Kolář	2	7	[10]
(Sweden) F Bergevi (Poland) P Matuszewski	6	5	[6]
(Australia) L Tu (Japan) K Uchida	w/o
(Germany) D Masur (Croatia) M Poljičak
(Germany) H Jebens (Germany) Niklas Schell	6	6
(Belgium) J De Loore (Belgium) M Geerts	4	3
(France) A Escoffier (France) E Furness	6	6^{6}	[9]
4	(France) T Arribagé (Germany) C Frantzen	2	7^{8}	[11]
WC	(Italy) Andrea Del Federico (Italy) Filiberto Fumagalli	1	1
(Croatia) Z Babić (United Kingdom) C Broom	6	6
(Poland) K Drzewiecki (Poland) K Żuk	6	3	[8]
2	(Romania) VV Cornea (Croatia) F Škugor	4	6	[10]

Quarterfinals
1	(Ukraine) V Manafov (Ukraine) O Prihodko	6	6
(Peru) A Merino (Switzerland) J Paul	3	4
3	(Czech Republic) M Gengel (Czech Republic) Z Kolář	6	6
(Australia) L Tu (Japan) K Uchida	1	4
(Germany) H Jebens (Germany) N Schell	6	1	[10]
4	(France) T Arribagé (Germany) C Frantzen	4	6	[5]
(Croatia) Z Babić (United Kingdom) C Broom	3	2
2	(Romania) VV Cornea (Croatia) F Škugor	6	6

Semifinals
1	(Ukraine) V Manafov (Ukraine) O Prihodko	6	6
3	(Czech Republic) M Gengel (Czech Republic) Z Kolář	4	2
(Germany) H Jebens (Germany) N Schell	3	4
2	(Romania) VV Cornea (Croatia) F Škugor	6	6

Final
1	(Ukraine) V Manafov (Ukraine) O Prihodko	7^{7}	2	[4]
2	(Romania) VV Cornea (Croatia) F Škugor	6^{3}	6	[10]
