= 2024 i-Vent Open Branik Maribor =

Tennis tournament

- Date: 18–24 March 2024
- Edition: 2nd
- Category: ITF Women's World Tennis Tour
- Prize money: $60,000
- Surface: Hard / Indoor
- Location: Maribor, Slovenia

Champions

Singles
- (Czech Republic) Dominika Šalková

Doubles
- (United Kingdom) Eden Silva / Anastasia Tikhonova
← 2023 ·	Branik Maribor Open	· 2025 →

The 2024 i-Vent Open Branik Maribor was a professional tennis tournament played on indoor hard courts. It was the second edition of the tournament, which was part of the 2024 ITF Women's World Tennis Tour. It took place in Maribor, Slovenia, between 18 and 24 March 2024.

== Champions ==
=== Singles ===
- (Czech Republic) Dominika Šalková def. (Australia) Talia Gibson, 6–2, 6–4

=== Doubles ===
- (United Kingdom) Eden Silva / Anastasia Tikhonova def. (Thailand) Luksika Kumkhum / (Thailand) Peangtarn Plipuech, 7–5, 6–3

== Singles main draw entrants ==
=== Seeds ===
Country	Player	Rank	Seed
AUS	Olivia Gadecki	140	1
FRA	Jessika Ponchet	141	2
HUN	Tímea Babos	157	3
AUS	Kimberly Birrell	160	4
SUI	Céline Naef	163	5
CZE	Gabriela Knutson	165	6
	Valeria Savinykh	169	7
SVK	Viktória Hrunčáková	170	8

- Rankings are as of 4 March 2024.

=== Other entrants ===
The following players received wildcards into the singles main draw:

- (Georgia (country)) Mariam Bolkvadze
- (Slovenia) Polona Hercog
- (Slovenia) Pia Lovrič
- (Slovenia) Ela Nala Milić

The following players received entry from the qualifying draw:

- (Italy) Silvia Ambrosio
- (Czech Republic) Nikola Bartůňková
- (Czech Republic) Aneta Kučmová
- (Chinese Taipei) Liang En-shuo
- Ekaterina Maklakova
- Elena Pridankina
- (United States) Anna Rogers
- (Liechtenstein) Kathinka von Deichmann

The following player received entry as a lucky loser:

- (Hong Kong) Eudice Chong
