= 2026 Internazionali di Tennis Città di Rovereto – Singles =

Singles
- 2026 Internazionali di Tennis Città di Rovereto

Final
- Champion: (Canada) Bianca Andreescu
- Runner-up: (Czech Republic) Dominika Šalková
- Score: 7–6^{(7–2)}, 6–2

Details
- Draw: 32 (4 WC)
- Seeds: 8

Events
Singles	Doubles
- Internazionali di Tennis Città di Rovereto

Bianca Andreescu won the title, after defeating Dominika Šalková 7–6^{(7–2)}, 6–2 in the final.

Oksana Selekhmeteva was the reigning champion but lost in the first round to Lea Bošković.

== Seeds ==
1. (Croatia) Antonia Ružić (second round)
2. (Spain) Oksana Selekhmeteva (first round)
3. (Italy) Lisa Pigato (second round)
4. (Armenia) Alina Charaeva (first round)
5. (Italy) Lucrezia Stefanini (quarterfinals)
6. (Czech Republic) Dominika Šalková (final)
7. (Italy) Lucia Bronzetti (second round)
8. (Colombia) Emiliana Arango (first round)

== Draw ==
Key

- Q = Qualifier
- WC = Wild card
- LL = Lucky loser
- Alt = Alternate
- ITF = ITF entry
- PR = Protected ranking
- SR = Special ranking
- SE = Special exempt
- JE = Junior exempt
- JR = Junior Accelerator Programme entrant
- CO = College Accelerator Programme entrant
- NG = Next Gen Accelerator Program entrant
- w/o = Walkover
- r = Retired
- d = Defaulted

=== Finals ===
Semifinals
(Canada) Bianca Andreescu	6	6
(Czech Republic) Lucie Havlíčková	3	1
(Poland) Martyna Kubka	6	5	3
6	(Czech Republic) Dominika Šalková	1	7	6

Final
(Canada) Bianca Andreescu	7^{7}	6
6	(Czech Republic) Dominika Šalková	6^{2}	2

=== Top half ===
First round
1	(Croatia) A Ružić	7	6
(Czech Republic) A Sisková	5	3
(Canada) B Andreescu	6	6
(Serbia) M Ristić	2	2
P Iatcenko	6	4	0
(France) H Tan	2	6	6
WC	(Italy) L Mair	6	2	5
5	(Italy) L Stefanini	3	6	7
3	(Italy) L Pigato	6	6
J Avdeeva	4	4
(Poland) L Klimovičová	4	5
(Czech Republic) L Havlíčková	6	7
(Switzerland) J Teichmann	6	7
Q	(Germany) T Brockmann	3	5
(Germany) M Barthel	6	1	0
7	(Italy) L Bronzetti	3	6	6

Second round
1	(Croatia) A Ružić	5	6	5
(Canada) B Andreescu	7	3	7
(France) H Tan	2	3
5	(Italy) L Stefanini	6	6
3	(Italy) L Pigato	0	1
(Czech Republic) L Havlíčková	6	6
(Switzerland) J Teichmann	6	7
7	(Italy) L Bronzetti	4	5

Quarterfinals
(Canada) B Andreescu	6	7
5	(Italy) L Stefanini	2	5
(Czech Republic) L Havlíčková	6	6
(Switzerland) J Teichmann	2	4

Semifinals
(Canada) B Andreescu	6	6
(Czech Republic) L Havlíčková	3	1

=== Bottom half ===
First round
8	(Colombia) E Arango	4	3
(Czech Republic) G Knutson	6	6
(Switzerland) S Bandecchi	6	6
WC	(Italy) G Maduzzi	3	2
LL	(France) E Jacquemot	5	6^{5}
(Serbia) T Kostović	7	7^{7}
(Poland) M Kubka	6	6
4	(Armenia) A Charaeva	1	2
6	(Czech Republic) D Šalková	6	6
WC	(Italy) E Visentin	0	1
WC	(Italy) N Basiletti	2	2
(Slovakia) V Hrunčáková	6	6
Q	(Netherlands) A Koevermans	5	6	6
Q	E Andreeva	7	1	4
Q	(Croatia) L Bošković	6	7^{7}
2	(Spain) O Selekhmeteva	2	6^{2}

Second round
(Czech Republic) G Knutson	3	7^{7}	7^{7}
(Switzerland) S Bandecchi	6	6^{4}	6^{3}
(Serbia) T Kostović	3	4
(Poland) M Kubka	6	6
6	(Czech Republic) D Šalková	2	6	6
(Slovakia) V Hrunčáková	6	4	3
Q	(Netherlands) A Koevermans	1^{r}
Q	(Croatia) L Bošković	4

Quarterfinals
(Czech Republic) G Knutson	5	2^{r}
(Poland) M Kubka	7	4
6	(Czech Republic) D Šalková	6	2	6
Q	(Croatia) L Bošković	3	6	3

Semifinals
(Poland) M Kubka	6	5	3
6	(Czech Republic) D Šalková	1	7	6

== Qualifying ==
=== Seeds ===
1. (France) Elsa Jacquemot (qualifying competition, lucky loser)
2. Erika Andreeva (qualified)
3. (Netherlands) Anouk Koevermans (qualified)
4. (Germany) Anna-Lena Friedsam (qualifying competition)
5. (Germany) Caroline Werner (qualifying competition)
6. (China) Li Zongyu (qualifying competition, retired)
7. (Croatia) Lea Bošković (qualified)
8. (Germany) Tessa Brockmann (qualified)

=== Qualifiers ===
1. (Croatia) Lea Bošković
2. Erika Andreeva
3. (Netherlands) Anouk Koevermans
4. (Germany) Tessa Brockmann

=== Lucky loser ===
1. (France) Elsa Jacquemot

=== Draw ===
==== First qualifier ====
First round
1	(France) Elsa Jacquemot	6	6
(Italy) Camilla Zanolini	1	2
(Slovenia) Alja Senica	1	1
7	(Croatia) Lea Bošković	6	6

Qualifying competition
1	(France) Elsa Jacquemot	3	2
7	(Croatia) Lea Bošković	6	6

==== Second qualifier ====
First round
2	Erika Andreeva	6	6
(Italy) Giulia Alessia Monteleone	0	0
(Italy) Isabella Maria Șerban	2	1
6	(China) Li Zongyu	6	6

Qualifying competition
2	Erika Andreeva	7	0
6	(China) Li Zongyu	5	1^{r}

==== Third qualifier ====
First round
3	(Netherlands) Anouk Koevermans	7	6
(India) Ankita Raina	5	4
(Slovenia) Kristina Novak	1	1
5	(Germany) Caroline Werner	6	6

Qualifying competition
3	(Netherlands) Anouk Koevermans	6	7
5	(Germany) Caroline Werner	4	5

==== Fourth qualifier ====
First round
4	(Germany) Anna-Lena Friedsam	6	6
WC	(Italy) Lisa Peer	0	0
WC	(Italy) Ana Tamindžić	1	1
8	(Germany) Tessa Brockmann	6	6

Qualifying competition
4	(Germany) Anna-Lena Friedsam	5	3
8	(Germany) Tessa Brockmann	7	6
