= 2024 i-Vent Open Branik Maribor – Doubles =

Doubles
- 2024 i-Vent Open Branik Maribor

Final
- Champions: (United Kingdom) Eden Silva; Anastasia Tikhonova
- Runners-up: (Thailand) Luksika Kumkhum (Thailand) Peangtarn Plipuech
- Score: 7–5, 6–3

Events
Singles	Doubles
← 2023 ·	Branik Maribor Open	· 2025 →

Sofya Lansere and Anastasia Tikhonova were the defending champions but Lansere chose not to participate.

Tikhonova partnered alongside Eden Silva and successfully defended her title, defeating Luksika Kumkhum and Peangtarn Plipuech in the final, 7–5, 6–3.

== Seeds ==
1. Amina Anshba / (Czech Republic) Anastasia Dețiuc (quarterfinals)
2. (United Kingdom) Maia Lumsden / (France) Jessika Ponchet (semifinals)
3. (Thailand) Luksika Kumkhum / (Thailand) Peangtarn Plipuech (final)
4. (United Kingdom) Eden Silva / Anastasia Tikhonova (champions)

== Draw ==
Key

- Q = Qualifier
- WC = Wild card
- LL = Lucky loser
- Alt = Alternate
- ITF = ITF entry
- PR = Protected ranking
- SR = Special ranking
- SE = Special exempt
- JE = Junior exempt
- JR = Junior Accelerator Programme entrant
- CO = College Accelerator Programme entrant
- NG = Next Gen Accelerator Program entrant
- w/o = Walkover
- r = Retired
- d = Defaulted

First round
1	A Anshba (Czech Republic) A Dețiuc	5	6	[10]
(United States) J Loeb (United States) A Rogers	7	2	[4]
WC	(Slovenia) A Lanišek (Slovenia) P Lovrič	4	1
(Chinese Taipei) E-s Liang (China) Q Tang	6	6
3	(Thailand) L Kumkhum (Thailand) P Plipuech	6	7
(Switzerland) C Naef; E Pridankina	3	5
WC	(Slovenia) P Petelinšek (Slovenia) A Žnuderl	1	5
WC	(Slovenia) N Jurič (Slovenia) A Senica	6	7
(Portugal) F Jorge (Czech Republic) D Šalková	6^{6}	7	[4]
(Netherlands) I Haverlag (United Kingdom) L Miyazaki	7^{8}	5	[10]
(Australia) K Birrell (Czech Republic) J Malečková	3	3
4	(United Kingdom) E Silva; A Tikhonova	6	6
V Savinykh (Chinese Taipei) Y-y Yang	6^{2}	4
(Czech Republic) K Kubáňová (Czech Republic) A Kučmová	7^{7}	6
(United Kingdom) A Collins (India) P Thombare	6^{0}	4
2	(United Kingdom) M Lumsden (France) J Ponchet	7^{7}	6

Quarterfinals
1	A Anshba (Czech Republic) A Dețiuc	6	1	[5]
(Chinese Taipei) E-s Liang (China) Q Tang	4	6	[10]
3	(Thailand) L Kumkhum (Thailand) P Plipuech	7^{7}	6
WC	(Slovenia) N Jurič (Slovenia) A Senica	6^{5}	2
(Netherlands) I Haverlag (United Kingdom) L Miyazaki	5	2
4	(United Kingdom) E Silva; A Tikhonova	7	6
(Czech Republic) K Kubáňová (Czech Republic) A Kučmová	5	4
2	(United Kingdom) M Lumsden (France) J Ponchet	7	6

Semifinals
(Chinese Taipei) E-s Liang (China) Q Tang	4	6^{4}
3	(Thailand) L Kumkhum (Thailand) P Plipuech	6	7^{7}
4	(United Kingdom) E Silva; A Tikhonova	6^{6}	7^{7}	[10]
2	(United Kingdom) M Lumsden (France) J Ponchet	7^{8}	6^{1}	[5]

Final
3	(Thailand) L Kumkhum (Thailand) P Plipuech	5	3
4	(United Kingdom) E Silva; A Tikhonova	7	6
