= 2026 Internazionali di Tennis Città di Rovereto – Doubles =

Doubles
- 2026 Internazionali di Tennis Città di Rovereto

Final
- Champions: (Netherlands) Isabelle Haverlag (Poland) Martyna Kubka
- Runners-up: (Czech Republic) Dominika Šalková (Czech Republic) Anna Sisková
- Score: 6–1, 6–2

Details
- Draw: 15 (1 WC)
- Seeds: 4

Events
| Singles | Doubles |
- Internazionali di Tennis Città di Rovereto

Jesika Malečková and Miriam Škoch were the reigning champions, but chose not to participate.

Isabelle Haverlag and Martyna Kubka won the title, after defeating Dominika Šalková and Anna Sisková 6–1, 6–2 in the final.

== Seeds ==
1. (Netherlands) Isabelle Haverlag / (Poland) Martyna Kubka (champions)
2. (Czech Republic) Dominika Šalková / (Czech Republic) Anna Sisková (final)
3. (United States) Catherine Harrison / (United States) Dalayna Hewitt (quarterfinals)
4. (India) Rutuja Bhosale / (Belgium) Lara Salden (semifinals)

== Draw ==
Key

- Q = Qualifier
- WC = Wild card
- LL = Lucky loser
- Alt = Alternate
- ITF = ITF entry
- PR = Protected ranking
- SR = Special ranking
- SE = Special exempt
- JE = Junior exempt
- JR = Junior Accelerator Programme entrant
- CO = College Accelerator Programme entrant
- NG = Next Gen Accelerator Program entrant
- w/o = Walkover
- r = Retired
- d = Defaulted

=== Draw ===
First round
(Italy) L Mair (Italy) C Zanolini | 2 | 6^{3}
(China) Z Li (Thailand) P Plipuech | 6 | 7^{7}
3 | (United States) C Harrison (United States) D Hewitt | 6 | 6
(United Kingdom) S Anane (Italy) F Dell'Edera | 1 | 1
(Italy) N Basiletti (Italy) G Maduzzi | 6 | 6
WC | (Italy) A Tamindžić (Italy) E Visentin | 1 | 2
(Italy) L Peer (Slovenia) A Senica | 0 | 1
(United States) J Daniel (Bosnia and Herzegovina) A Wagner | 6 | 6
(Croatia) M Dražić (France) M Mattel | 4 | 5
4 | (India) R Bhosale (Belgium) L Salden | 6 | 7
(Germany) T Morderger (Germany) Y Morderger | 4 | 6^{3}
(Slovenia) K Novak (Czech Republic) I Šebestová | 6 | 7^{7}
(Japan) H Kuwata (India) A Raina | 3 | 6 | [6]
2 | (Czech Republic) D Šalková (Czech Republic) A Sisková | 6 | 3 | [10]

Quarterfinals
1 | (Netherlands) I Haverlag (Poland) M Kubka | 7^{8} | 3 | [15]
(China) Z Li (Thailand) P Plipuech | 6^{6} | 6 | [13]
3 | (United States) C Harrison (United States) D Hewitt | 6 | 1 | [6]
(Italy) N Basiletti (Italy) G Maduzzi | 4 | 6 | [10]
(United States) J Daniel (Bosnia and Herzegovina) A Wagner | 4 | 4
4 | (India) R Bhosale (Belgium) L Salden | 6 | 6
(Slovenia) K Novak (Czech Republic) I Šebestová | 2 | 0
2 | (Czech Republic) D Šalková (Czech Republic) A Sisková | 6 | 6

Semifinals
1 | (Netherlands) I Haverlag (Poland) M Kubka | 6 | 5 | [10]
(Italy) N Basiletti (Italy) G Maduzzi | 4 | 7 | [7]
4 | (India) R Bhosale (Belgium) L Salden | 5 | 2
2 | (Czech Republic) D Šalková (Czech Republic) A Sisková | 7 | 6

Final
1 | (Netherlands) I Haverlag (Poland) M Kubka | 6 | 6
2 | (Czech Republic) D Šalková (Czech Republic) A Sisková | 1 | 2
