= 2024 i-Vent Open Branik Maribor – Singles =

Singles
- 2024 i-Vent Open Branik Maribor

Final
- Champion: (Czech Republic) Dominika Šalková
- Runner-up: (Australia) Talia Gibson
- Score: 6–2, 6–4

Events
| Singles | Doubles |
| ← 2023 · | Branik Maribor Open | · 2025 → |

Mai Hontama was the defending champion but chose not to participate.

Dominika Šalková won the title, defeating Talia Gibson in the final, 6–2, 6–4.

== Seeds ==
1. (Australia) Olivia Gadecki (first round)
2. (France) Jessika Ponchet (quarterfinals)
3. (Hungary) Tímea Babos (semifinals)
4. (Australia) Kimberly Birrell (first round)
5. (Switzerland) Céline Naef (first round)
6. (Czech Republic) Gabriela Knutson (first round)
7. Valeria Savinykh (second round)
8. (Slovakia) Viktória Hrunčáková (second round)

== Draw ==
=== Key ===
- Q = Qualifier
- WC = Wild card
- LL = Lucky loser
- Alt = Alternate
- SE = Special exempt
- PR = Protected ranking
- ITF = ITF entry
- JE = Junior exempt
- w/o = Walkover
- r = Retired
- d = Defaulted
- SR = Special ranking

=== Finals ===
Semifinals
(Czech Republic) Dominika Šalková | 6 | 6
Q | Elena Pridankina | 2 | 1
3 | (Hungary) Tímea Babos | 4 | 1
(Australia) Talia Gibson | 6 | 6

Final
(Czech Republic) Dominika Šalková | 6 | 6
(Australia) Talia Gibson | 2 | 4

=== Top half ===
First round
1 | (Australia) O Gadecki | 2 | 2
Q | (Czech Republic) N Bartůňková | 6 | 6
(Chinese Taipei) Y-y Yang | 2^{r}
(Czech Republic) D Šalková | 5
Q | E Maklakova | 6 | 1 | 6
(Slovenia) V Erjavec | 2 | 6 | 1
(Croatia) A Ružić | 4 | 2
8 | (Slovakia) V Hrunčáková | 6 | 6
4 | (Australia) K Birrell | 3 | 4
WC | (Georgia (country)) M Bolkvadze | 6 | 6
Q | (Czech Republic) A Kučmová | 5 | 3
Q | (Chinese Taipei) E-s Liang | 7 | 6
(Romania) E-G Ruse | 6 | 6
Q | (Liechtenstein) K von Deichmann | 3 | 3
Q | E Pridankina | 6 | 1 | 7^{7}
5 | (Switzerland) C Naef | 2 | 6 | 6^{5}

Second round
Q | (Czech Republic) N Bartůňková | 6 | 2 | 3
(Czech Republic) D Šalková | 4 | 6 | 6
Q | E Maklakova | 6 | 6
8 | (Slovakia) V Hrunčáková | 3 | 3
WC | (Georgia (country)) M Bolkvadze | 7 | 4
Q | (Chinese Taipei) E-s Liang | 5 | 2^{r}
(Romania) E-G Ruse | 1 | 1
Q | E Pridankina | 6 | 6

Quarterfinals
(Czech Republic) D Šalková | 6 | 6
Q | E Maklakova | 4 | 1
WC | (Georgia (country)) M Bolkvadze | 7^{7} | 1^{r}
Q | E Pridankina | 6^{4} | 2

Semifinals
(Czech Republic) D Šalková | 6 | 6
Q | E Pridankina | 2 | 1

=== Bottom half ===
First round
6 | (Czech Republic) G Knutson | 4 | 3
P Kudermetova | 6 | 6
(Portugal) F Jorge | 4 | 2
(United Kingdom) L Miyazaki | 6 | 6
WC | (Slovenia) P Lovrič | 6 | 3 | 3
LL | (Hong Kong) E Chong | 3 | 6 | 6
WC | (Slovenia) P Hercog | 3 | 2
3 | (Hungary) T Babos | 6 | 6
7 | V Savinykh | 6 | 7
Q | (United States) A Rogers | 2 | 5
A Tikhonova | 2 | 4
(Australia) T Gibson | 6 | 6
Q | (Italy) S Ambrosio | 3 | 3
(Japan) H Sakatsume | 6 | 6
WC | (Slovenia) EN Milić | 3 | 0
2 | (France) J Ponchet | 6 | 6

Second round
P Kudermetova | 2 | 7 | 2
(United Kingdom) L Miyazaki | 6 | 5 | 6
LL | (Hong Kong) E Chong | 5 | 3
3 | (Hungary) T Babos | 7 | 6
7 | V Savinykh | 1 | 6^{7}
(Australia) T Gibson | 6 | 7^{9}
(Japan) H Sakatsume | 5 | 4
2 | (France) J Ponchet | 7 | 6

Quarterfinals
(United Kingdom) L Miyazaki | 5 | 6 | 4
3 | (Hungary) T Babos | 7 | 2 | 6
(Australia) T Gibson | 6 | 7^{7}
2 | (France) J Ponchet | 2 | 6^{4}

Semifinals
3 | (Hungary) T Babos | 4 | 1
(Australia) T Gibson | 6 | 6
