= 2024 Internazionali di Tennis Città di Rovereto – Singles =

Singles
- 2024 Internazionali di Tennis Città di Rovereto

Final
- Champion: (Italy) Luca Nardi
- Runner-up: (Italy) Francesco Maestrelli
- Score: 6–1, 6–3

Events
Singles	Doubles
← 2023 ·	Internazionali di Tennis Città di Rovereto

Dominic Stricker was the defending champion but chose not to defend his title.

Luca Nardi won the title after defeating Francesco Maestrelli 6–1, 6–3 in the final.

== Seeds ==
1. (Croatia) Borna Ćorić (second round)
2. (Italy) Luca Nardi (champion)
3. (Switzerland) Alexander Ritschard (first round)
4. (Belgium) Raphaël Collignon (first round)
5. (France) Pierre-Hugues Herbert (first round)
6. (Spain) Martín Landaluce (semifinals)
7. (United Kingdom) Jan Choinski (withdrew)
8. (Denmark) August Holmgren (semifinals)

== Draw ==
Key

- Q = Qualifier
- WC = Wild card
- LL = Lucky loser
- Alt = Alternate
- ITF = ITF entry
- PR = Protected ranking
- SR = Special ranking
- SE = Special exempt
- JE = Junior exempt
- JR = Junior Accelerator Programme entrant
- CO = College Accelerator Programme entrant
- NG = Next Gen Accelerator Program entrant
- w/o = Walkover
- r = Retired
- d = Defaulted

=== Finals ===
Semifinals
WC	(Italy) Francesco Maestrelli	2	6	6
8	(Denmark) August Holmgren	6	3	4
6	(Spain) Martín Landaluce	4	6	3
2	(Italy) Luca Nardi	6	2	6

Final
WC	(Italy) Francesco Maestrelli	1	3
2	(Italy) Luca Nardi	6	6

=== Top half ===
First round
1	(Croatia) B Ćorić	6	5	6
(Italy) Samuel Vincent Ruggeri	4	7	2
(Croatia) D Prižmić	6	6
Q	(Ukraine) V Sachko	3	3
(Italy) E Dalla Valle	1	7^{7}	3
Q	(Republic of Ireland) M Agwi	6	6^{4}	6
WC	(Italy) F Maestrelli	7^{7}	6
5	(France) P-H Herbert	6^{5}	3
4	(Belgium) R Collignon	6^{4}	4
(Germany) D Masur	7^{7}	6
Alt	A Vatutin	6	6
WC	(Italy) G Oradini	2	4
WC	(Italy) J Berrettini	3	6	5
(Italy) F Arnaboldi	6	2	7
(France) Jules Marie	1	2
8	(Denmark) A Holmgren	6	6

Second round
1	(Croatia) B Ćorić	3	6	5
(Croatia) D Prižmić	6	4	7
Q	(Republic of Ireland) M Agwi	6^{10}	7^{7}	2
WC	(Italy) F Maestrelli	7^{12}	6^{5}	6
(Germany) D Masur	2	5
Alt	A Vatutin	6	7
(Italy) F Arnaboldi	3	1
8	(Denmark) A Holmgren	6	6

Quarterfinals
(Croatia) D Prižmić	6	1	6^{1}
WC	(Italy) F Maestrelli	3	6	7^{7}
Alt	A Vatutin	4	4
8	(Denmark) A Holmgren	6	6

Semifinals
WC	(Italy) F Maestrelli	2	6	6
8	(Denmark) A Holmgren	6	3	4

=== Bottom half ===
First round
6	(Spain) M Landaluce	6	7
(Netherlands) J Sels	2	5
Q	(Switzerland) M Brunold	6	6^{5}	5
(France) K Jacquet	4	7^{7}	7
(Italy) S Travaglia	2	0
(France) G Blancaneaux	6	6
(Spain) B Zapata Miralles	7	6
3	(Switzerland) A Ritschard	5	3
LL	(Slovakia) M Karol	6^{4}	4
Q	(Ukraine) O Prihodko	7^{7}	6
(Croatia) L Mikrut	6	7
Q	(Switzerland) K Feldbausch	4	5
Q	(Romania) B Pavel	3	6	3
Alt	(Germany) MH Rehberg	6	3	6
(Italy) G Fonio	6	2	2
2	(Italy) L Nardi	3	6	6

Second round
6	(Spain) M Landaluce	6	7
(France) K Jacquet	2	5
(France) G Blancaneaux	4	6	6
(Spain) B Zapata Miralles	6	0	2
Q	(Ukraine) O Prihodko	6	6
(Croatia) L Mikrut	2	3
Alt	(Germany) MH Rehberg	2	2
2	(Italy) L Nardi	6	6

Quarterfinals
6	(Spain) M Landaluce	7^{8}	6
(France) G Blancaneaux	6^{6}	4
Q	(Ukraine) O Prihodko	2	2
2	(Italy) L Nardi	6	6

Semifinals
6	(Spain) M Landaluce	4	6	3
2	(Italy) L Nardi	6	2	6
