= 2023 Internazionali di Tennis Città di Rovereto – Singles =

Singles
- 2023 Internazionali di Tennis Città di Rovereto

Final
- Champion: (Switzerland) Dominic Stricker
- Runner-up: (Italy) Giulio Zeppieri
- Score: 7–6^{(10–8)}, 6–2

Events
Singles	Doubles
Internazionali di Tennis Città di Rovereto	· 2024 →

This was the first edition of the tournament.

Dominic Stricker won the title after defeating Giulio Zeppieri 7–6^{(10–8)}, 6–2 in the final.

== Seeds ==
1. (Austria) Jurij Rodionov (quarterfinals)
2. (Switzerland) Dominic Stricker (champion)
3. (Italy) Giulio Zeppieri (final)
4. (Czech Republic) Zdeněk Kolář (quarterfinals)
5. (Italy) Matteo Gigante (first round)
6. (Japan) Kaichi Uchida (semifinals)
7. (France) Antoine Escoffier (quarterfinals)
8. (Belgium) Joris De Loore (second round)

== Draw ==
Key

- Q = Qualifier
- WC = Wild card
- LL = Lucky loser
- Alt = Alternate
- ITF = ITF entry
- PR = Protected ranking
- SR = Special ranking
- SE = Special exempt
- JE = Junior exempt
- JR = Junior Accelerator Programme entrant
- CO = College Accelerator Programme entrant
- NG = Next Gen Accelerator Program entrant
- w/o = Walkover
- r = Retired
- d = Defaulted

=== Finals ===
Semifinals
6	(Japan) Kaichi Uchida	5	2
3/WC	(Italy) Giulio Zeppieri	7	6
(Belgium) Gauthier Onclin	3	6^{3}
2	(Switzerland) Dominic Stricker	6	7^{7}

Final
3/WC	(Italy) Giulio Zeppieri	6^{8}	2
2	(Switzerland) Dominic Stricker	7^{10}	6

=== Top half ===
First round
1	(Austria) J Rodionov	6	6
(Australia) L Tu	3	3
(Czech Republic) M Gengel	1	4
(United Kingdom) J Choinski	6	6
(Hungary) M Valkusz	4	4
(Germany) P Gojowczyk	6	6
(Romania) FC Jianu	4	1^{r}
6	(Japan) K Uchida	6	3
3/WC	(Italy) G Zeppieri	6	6
WC	(Italy) G Ferrari	1	3
Q	(United Kingdom) C Broom	6	4
Q	(Italy) A Arnaboldi	2	0^{r}
Q	(Romania) M Copil	6^{5}	7	6
(Poland) K Żuk	7^{7}	5	4
Alt	(Belgium) R Collignon	6	5	6^{3}
7	(France) A Escoffier	4	7	7^{7}

Second round
1	(Austria) J Rodionov	6	2	6
(United Kingdom) J Choinski	2	6	4
(Germany) P Gojowczyk	6	1	6^{1}
6	(Japan) K Uchida	1	6	7^{7}
3/WC	(Italy) G Zeppieri	4	6	6
Q	(United Kingdom) C Broom	6	1	2
Q	(Romania) M Copil	1	5
7	(France) A Escoffier	6	7

Quarterfinals
1	(Austria) J Rodionov	6^{6}	6	3
6	(Japan) K Uchida	7^{8}	2	6
3/WC	(Italy) G Zeppieri	2	6	6
7	(France) A Escoffier	6	3	2

Semifinals
6	(Japan) K Uchida	5	2
3/WC	(Italy) G Zeppieri	7	6

=== Bottom half ===
First round
5	(Italy) M Gigante	4	6	4
WC	(Italy) Marcello Serafini	6	2	6
(Belgium) G Onclin	6	7^{7}
(Czech Republic) L Rosol	1	6^{0}
LL	E Donskoy	6^{4}	6	6
(France) E Furness	7^{7}	3	4
I Gakhov	3	4
4	(Czech Republic) Z Kolář	6	6
8	(Belgium) J De Loore	7^{8}	6
Q	(Italy) S Travaglia	6^{6}	4
LL	(Spain) A Moro Cañas	6	4	6
Q	(China) Y Bu	4	6	2
(Belgium) M Geerts	7^{7}	4	2
Q	(France) M Bourgue	6^{5}	6	6
(Croatia) M Poljičak	6	5	1
2	(Switzerland) D Stricker	3	7	6

Second round
WC	(Italy) M Serafini	4	6	5
(Belgium) G Onclin	6	2	7
LL	E Donskoy	4	5
4	(Czech Republic) Z Kolář	6	7
8	(Belgium) J De Loore	1	7	5
LL	(Spain) A Moro Cañas	6	5	7
Q	(France) M Bourgue	4	3
2	(Switzerland) D Stricker	6	6

Quarterfinals
(Belgium) G Onclin	6	6
4	(Czech Republic) Z Kolář	3	3
LL	(Spain) A Moro Cañas	4	6	0
2	(Switzerland) D Stricker	6	4	6

Semifinals
(Belgium) G Onclin	3	6^{3}
2	(Switzerland) D Stricker	6	7^{7}
