= 2024 Advantage Cars Prague Open =

Tennis tournament in the Czech Republic

- Date: 6–12 May 2024
- Edition: 31st (men); 19th (women)
- Category: ATP Challenger Tour; ITF Women's World Tennis Tour
- Prize money: €74,825 (men) $60,000 (women)
- Surface: Clay / Outdoor
- Location: Prague, Czech Republic

Champions

Men's singles
- (Czech Republic) Jiří Veselý

Women's singles
- (Czech Republic) Dominika Šalková

Men's doubles
- (Germany) Jakob Schnaitter / (Germany) Mark Wallner

Women's doubles
- (Australia) Jaimee Fourlis / (Czech Republic) Dominika Šalková
- I.ČLTK Prague Open

The 2024 Advantage Cars Prague Open was a professional tennis tournament played on outdoor clay courts. It was the thirty-first (men) and nineteenth (women) editions of the tournament, which were part of the 2024 ATP Challenger Tour and the 2024 ITF Women's World Tennis Tour. It took place in Prague, Czech Republic, between 6 and 12 May 2024.

== Champions ==
=== Men's singles ===
- (Czech Republic) Jiří Veselý def. (Belgium) Gauthier Onclin 6–2, 3–6, 7–6^{(7–3)}.

=== Women's singles ===
- (Czech Republic) Dominika Šalková def. (Poland) Maja Chwalińska, 6–3, 6–0

=== Men's doubles ===
- (Germany) Jakob Schnaitter / (Germany) Mark Wallner def. (Czech Republic) Jiří Barnat / (Czech Republic) Jan Hrazdil 6–3, 6–1.

=== Women's doubles ===
- (Australia) Jaimee Fourlis / (Czech Republic) Dominika Šalková def. (Germany) Noma Noha Akugue / (Germany) Ella Seidel, 5–7, 7–5, [10–4]

== Men's singles main draw entrants ==
=== Seeds ===
Country	Player	Rank^{1}	Seed
SUI	Leandro Riedi	152	1
FRA	Hugo Grenier	153	2
ARG	Marco Trungelliti	169	3
GER	Rudolf Molleker	172	4
FRA	Benjamin Bonzi	176	5
USA	Martin Damm	177	6
CZE	Dalibor Svrčina	185	7
SVK	Alex Molčan	192	8

- ^{1} Rankings are as of 22 April 2024.

=== Other entrants ===
The following players received wildcards into the singles main draw:

- (Czech Republic) Jonáš Forejtek
- (United States) Toby Kodat
- (Czech Republic) Jan Kumstát

The following player received entry into the singles main draw as an alternate:

- (Czech Republic) Jiří Veselý

The following players received entry from the qualifying draw:

- (Georgia (country)) Nikoloz Basilashvili
- (France) Clément Chidekh
- (France) Mathys Erhard
- (United Kingdom) Felix Gill
- (Czech Republic) Martin Krumich
- (Switzerland) Jakub Paul

The following player received entry as a lucky loser:

- (Italy) Giovanni Fonio

== Women's singles main draw entrants ==
=== Seeds ===
Country	Player	Rank	Seed
NED	Suzan Lamens	134	1
HUN	Panna Udvardy	151	2
GER	Ella Seidel	152	3
CZE	Dominika Šalková	171	4
UKR	Kateryna Baindl	176	5
GER	Noma Noha Akugue	179	6
AUS	Priscilla Hon	192	7
TUR	İpek Öz	199	8

- Rankings are as of 22 April 2024.

=== Other entrants ===
The following players received wildcards into the singles main draw:

- (Czech Republic) Victoria Bervid
- (Czech Republic) Denisa Hindová
- (Czech Republic) Barbora Palicová
- (Czech Republic) Amélie Šmejkalová

The following players received entry from the qualifying draw:

- Amina Anshba
- (Czech Republic) Alena Kovačková
- (Czech Republic) Jesika Malečková
- Marina Melnikova
- (Italy) Jessica Pieri
- (Czech Republic) Ivana Šebestová
- (Italy) Dalila Spiteri
- (Germany) Stephanie Wagner

The following player received entry as a lucky loser:

- (Italy) Laura Mair
