= 2024 Advantage Cars Prague Open – Women's singles =

Women's singles
- 2024 Advantage Cars Prague Open

Final
- Champion: (Czech Republic) Dominika Šalková
- Runner-up: (Poland) Maja Chwalińska
- Score: 6–3, 6–0

Events
Singles	men	women
Doubles	men	women
- I.ČLTK Prague Open

Darja Semeņistaja was the defending champion but chose to compete in Rome instead.

Dominika Šalková won the title, defeating Maja Chwalińska in the final, 6–3, 6–0.

== Seeds ==
1. (Netherlands) Suzan Lamens (first round)
2. (Hungary) Panna Udvardy (second round)
3. (Germany) Ella Seidel (second round)
4. (Czech Republic) Dominika Šalková (champion)
5. (Ukraine) Kateryna Baindl (quarterfinals)
6. (Germany) Noma Noha Akugue (second round)
7. (Australia) Priscilla Hon (second round)
8. (Turkey) İpek Öz (semifinals)

== Draw ==
Key

- Q = Qualifier
- WC = Wild card
- LL = Lucky loser
- Alt = Alternate
- ITF = ITF entry
- PR = Protected ranking
- SR = Special ranking
- SE = Special exempt
- JE = Junior exempt
- JR = Junior Accelerator Programme entrant
- CO = College Accelerator Programme entrant
- NG = Next Gen Accelerator Program entrant
- w/o = Walkover
- r = Retired
- d = Defaulted

=== Finals ===
Semifinals
Q	(Czech Republic) Jesika Malečková	4	2
4	(Czech Republic) Dominika Šalková	6	6
8	(Turkey) İpek Öz	2	1
(Poland) Maja Chwalińska	6	6

Final
4	(Czech Republic) Dominika Šalková	6	6
(Poland) Maja Chwalińska	3	0

=== Top half ===
First round
1	(Netherlands) S Lamens	1	4
Q	(Czech Republic) I Šebestová	6	6
WC	(Czech Republic) A Šmejkalová	2	2
(Spain) L Romero Gormaz	6	6
Q	(Czech Republic) J Malečková	7	6
Q	(Czech Republic) A Kovačková	5	2
WC	(Czech Republic) B Palicová	2	7^{11}	6^{3}
7	(Australia) P Hon	6	6^{9}	7^{7}
4	(Czech Republic) D Šalková	6	6
Q	A Anshba	0	3
(Australia) J Fourlis	6	7^{8}
(Greece) D Papamichail	4	6^{6}
(Romania) A Mitu	2	6	6
LL	(Italy) L Mair	6	1	1
Q	M Melnikova	3	6^{7}
5	(Ukraine) K Baindl	6	7^{9}

Second round
Q	(Czech Republic) I Šebestová	1	0
(Spain) L Romero Gormaz	6	6
Q	(Czech Republic) J Malečková	6	6
7	(Australia) P Hon	4	2
4	(Czech Republic) D Šalková	6	6
(Australia) J Fourlis	3	2
(Romania) A Mitu	6	4	3
5	(Ukraine) K Baindl	4	6	6

Quarterfinals
(Spain) L Romero Gormaz	1	6	4
Q	(Czech Republic) J Malečková	6	1	6
4	(Czech Republic) D Šalková	3	6	6
5	(Ukraine) K Baindl	6	1	4

Semifinals
Q	(Czech Republic) J Malečková	4	2
4	(Czech Republic) D Šalková	6	6

=== Bottom half ===
First round
8	(Turkey) İ Öz	6	6
WC	(Czech Republic) D Hindová	1	1
WC	(Czech Republic) V Bervid	6	1	0^{r}
Q	(Italy) D Spiteri	4	6	1
(Uzbekistan) N Abduraimova	3	0
(Canada) M Stakusic	6	6
(Japan) H Sakatsume	3	4
3	(Germany) E Seidel	6	6
6	(Germany) N Noha Akugue	4	6	6
J Kolodynska	6	4	2
Q	(Italy) J Pieri	6	6^{8}	5
Q	(Germany) S Wagner	3	7^{10}	7
(Poland) M Chwalińska	7	6
(Czech Republic) L Klimovičová	5	1
(Romania) M Bulgaru	6^{4}	4
2	(Hungary) P Udvardy	7^{7}	6

Second round
8	(Turkey) İ Öz	6	6
Q	(Italy) D Spiteri	4	4
(Canada) M Stakusic	6	6
3	(Germany) E Seidel	4	0
6	(Germany) N Noha Akugue	2	3
Q	(Germany) S Wagner	6	6
(Poland) M Chwalińska	4	6	6
2	(Hungary) P Udvardy	6	2	2

Quarterfinals
8	(Turkey) İ Öz	6	3	6
(Canada) M Stakusic	2	6	3
Q	(Germany) S Wagner	3	4
(Poland) M Chwalińska	6	6

Semifinals
8	(Turkey) İ Öz	2	1
(Poland) M Chwalińska	6	6
