= Branik Maribor Open =

- 2024 i-Vent Open Branik Maribor

ITF Women's Tour
- Event name: i-Vent Branik Open Maribor (2024–); Lunos Branik Maribor Open (2023)
- Location: Maribor, Slovenia
- Venue: Tennis club Branik Maribor (TK Branik)
- Category: ITF Women's World Tennis Tour
- Surface: Hard / indoor
- Draw: 32S/24Q/16D
- Prize money: $60,000
- Website: www.teniski-klub-branik.si

The Branik Maribor Open is a tournament for professional female tennis players played on indoor hardcourts. The event is classified as a W75 ITF Women's World Tennis Tour tournament and has been held in Maribor, Slovenia, since 2023 (W40).

== Past finals ==
=== Singles ===
Year	Champion	Runner-up	Score
2026	Tatiana Prozorova	(Belgium) Hanne Vandewinkel	6–3, 6–3
2025	(Croatia) Antonia Ružić	(Poland) Linda Klimovičová	6–1, 4–6, 6–3
2024	(Czech Republic) Dominika Šalková	(Australia) Talia Gibson	6–2, 6–4
2023	(Japan) Mai Hontama	(Denmark) Clara Tauson	6–4, 3–6, 6–4

=== Doubles ===
Year	Champions	Runners-up	Score
2026	(Germany) Anna-Lena Friedsam (Czech Republic) Gabriela Knutson	(France) Jessika Ponchet (Czech Republic) Anna Sisková	4–6, 6–4, [10–6]
2025	(France) Julie Belgraver (Poland) Urszula Radwańska	(United Kingdom) Lily Miyazaki (France) Jessika Ponchet	6–1, 6–4
2024	(United Kingdom) Eden Silva; Anastasia Tikhonova	(Thailand) Luksika Kumkhum (Thailand) Peangtarn Plipuech	7–5, 6–3
2023	Sofya Lansere; Anastasia Tikhonova	(Romania) Irina Bara (Romania) Andreea Mitu	6–3, 6–2
