= 2024 Internazionali di Tennis Città di Rovereto =

- Date: 18–24 November
- Edition: 2nd
- Surface: Hard (indoor)
- Location: Rovereto, Italy

Champions

Singles
- (Italy) Luca Nardi

Doubles
- (India) Sriram Balaji / (India) Rithvik Choudary Bollipalli
← 2023 ·	Internazionali di Tennis Città di Rovereto

The 2024 Internazionali di Tennis Città di Rovereto, known as the Trofeo Perrel-Faip di Rovereto, was a professional tennis tournament played on indoor hardcourts. It was the second edition of the tournament which was part of the 2024 ATP Challenger Tour. It took place in Rovereto, having moved from Bergamo, Italy, between 18 and 24 November 2024.

== Singles main draw entrants ==
=== Seeds ===
Country	Player	Rank^{1}	Seed
CRO	Borna Ćorić	97	1
ITA	Luca Nardi	105	2
SUI	Alexander Ritschard	118	3
BEL	Raphaël Collignon	142	4
FRA	Pierre-Hugues Herbert	145	5
ESP	Martín Landaluce	164	6
~~GBR~~	~~Jan Choinski~~	~~180~~	~~7~~
DEN	August Holmgren	194	8

- ^{1} Rankings as of 11 November 2024.

=== Other entrants ===
The following players received wildcards into the singles main draw:

- (Italy) Jacopo Berrettini
- (Italy) Francesco Maestrelli
- (Italy) Giovanni Oradini

The following players received entry into the singles main draw as alternates:

- (Germany) Max Hans Rehberg
- Alexey Vatutin

The following players received entry from the qualifying draw:

- (Republic of Ireland) Michael Agwi
- (Switzerland) Mika Brunold
- (Switzerland) Kilian Feldbausch
- (Romania) Bogdan Pavel
- (Ukraine) Oleg Prihodko
- (Ukraine) Vitaliy Sachko

The following player received entry as a lucky loser:

- (Slovakia) Miloš Karol

== Champions ==
=== Singles ===
- (Italy) Luca Nardi def. (Italy) Francesco Maestrelli 6–1, 6–3.

=== Doubles ===
- (India) Sriram Balaji / (India) Rithvik Choudary Bollipalli def. (France) Théo Arribagé / (Portugal) Francisco Cabral 6–3, 2–6, [12–10].
