= 2024 Advantage Cars Prague Open – Men's doubles =

Men's doubles
- 2024 Advantage Cars Prague Open

Final
- Champions: (Germany) Jakob Schnaitter (Germany) Mark Wallner
- Runners-up: (Czech Republic) Jiří Barnat (Czech Republic) Jan Hrazdil
- Score: 6–3, 6–1

Events
Singles	men	women
Doubles	men	women
- Advantage Cars Prague Open

Petr Nouza and Andrew Paulson were the defending champions but only Nouza chose to defend his title, partnering Patrik Rikl. They lost in the semifinals to Jakob Schnaitter and Mark Wallner.

Schnaitter and Wallner won the title after defeating Jiří Barnat and Jan Hrazdil 6–3, 6–1 in the final.

== Seeds ==
1. (Sweden) André Göransson / (Netherlands) Sem Verbeek (first round)
2. (Spain) Sergio Martos Gornés / (Greece) Petros Tsitsipas (first round)
3. (India) Anirudh Chandrasekar / (India) Niki Kaliyanda Poonacha (quarterfinals)
4. (Czech Republic) Petr Nouza / (Czech Republic) Patrik Rikl (semifinals)

== Draw ==
Key

- Q = Qualifier
- WC = Wild card
- LL = Lucky loser
- Alt = Alternate
- ITF = ITF entry
- PR = Protected ranking
- SR = Special ranking
- SE = Special exempt
- JE = Junior exempt
- JR = Junior Accelerator Programme entrant
- CO = College Accelerator Programme entrant
- NG = Next Gen Accelerator Program entrant
- w/o = Walkover
- r = Retired
- d = Defaulted

=== Draw ===
First round
1	(Sweden) A Göransson (Netherlands) S Verbeek	6	6^{6}	[9]
(France) C Bittoun Kouzmine (Canada) K Stevenson	4	7^{8}	[11]
(Portugal) J Faria (Portugal) H Rocha	7^{9}	6
(Spain) A Moro Cañas (Spain) O Roca Batalla	6^{7}	4
3	(India) A Chandrasekar (India) N Kaliyanda Poonacha	6	6
(France) M Bourgue (France) H Grenier	1	3
WC	(Czech Republic) Jiří Barnat (Czech Republic) Jan Hrazdil	6	6
(Poland) K Drzewiecki (Poland) S Walków	3	3
(United Kingdom) B Jones (Switzerland) J Paul	6^{4}	6	[7]
WC	(United States) T Kodat (Czech Republic) M Vocel	7^{7}	4	[10]
(Romania) A Jecan (Greece) M Kalovelonis	5	6	[9]
4	(Czech Republic) P Nouza (Czech Republic) P Rikl	7	4	[11]
(Argentina) FA Gómez (United Kingdom) M Willis	6^{4}	6	[9]
(United States) M Damm (Czech Republic) R Jebavý	7^{7}	2	[11]
(Germany) J Schnaitter (Germany) M Wallner	4	7^{7}	[12]
2	(Spain) S Martos Gornés (Greece) Pe Tsitsipas	6	6^{3}	[10]

Quarterfinals
(France) C Bittoun Kouzmine (Canada) K Stevenson	4	7^{7}	[6]
(Portugal) J Faria (Portugal) H Rocha	6	6^{4}	[10]
3	(India) A Chandrasekar (India) N Kaliyanda Poonacha	3	6	[3]
WC	(Czech Republic) J Barnat (Czech Republic) J Hrazdil	6	1	[10]
WC	(United States) T Kodat (Czech Republic) M Vocel	3	3
4	(Czech Republic) P Nouza (Czech Republic) P Rikl	6	6
(United States) M Damm (Czech Republic) R Jebavý	3	2
(Germany) J Schnaitter (Germany) M Wallner	6	6

Semifinals
(Portugal) J Faria (Portugal) H Rocha	6	6^{5}	[10]
WC	(Czech Republic) J Barnat (Czech Republic) J Hrazdil	4	7^{7}	[12]
4	(Czech Republic) P Nouza (Czech Republic) P Rikl	3	7^{7}	[9]
(Germany) J Schnaitter (Germany) M Wallner	6	6^{2}	[11]

Final
WC	(Czech Republic) J Barnat (Czech Republic) J Hrazdil	3	1
(Germany) J Schnaitter (Germany) M Wallner	6	6
