= 2024 Advantage Cars Prague Open – Women's doubles =

Women's doubles
- 2024 Advantage Cars Prague Open

Final
- Champions: (Australia) Jaimee Fourlis (Czech Republic) Dominika Šalková
- Runners-up: (Germany) Noma Noha Akugue (Germany) Ella Seidel
- Score: 5–7, 7–5, [10–4]

Events
Singles	men	women
Doubles	men	women
- Advantage Cars Prague Open

The 2024 Advantage Cars Prague Open tennis tournament took place in Prague, Czech Republic, between 6 and 12 May 2024.

Maja Chwalińska and Jesika Malečková were the defending champions but Chwalińska chose not to participate. Malečková partnered Miriam Kolodziejová but lost in the semifinals to Noma Noha Akugue and Ella Seidel.

Jaimee Fourlis and Dominika Šalková won the title, defeating Noha Akugue and Seidel in the final, 5–7, 7–5, [10–4].

== Seeds ==
1. Amina Anshba / (Czech Republic) Anastasia Dețiuc (quarterfinals)
2. (Czech Republic) Miriam Kolodziejová / (Czech Republic) Jesika Malečková (semifinals)
3. (United Kingdom) Samantha Murray Sharan / (India) Prarthana Thombare (first round)
4. (United States) Jessie Aney / (Germany) Lena Papadakis (semifinals)

== Draw ==
Key

- Q = Qualifier
- WC = Wild card
- LL = Lucky loser
- Alt = Alternate
- ITF = ITF entry
- PR = Protected ranking
- SR = Special ranking
- SE = Special exempt
- JE = Junior exempt
- JR = Junior Accelerator Programme entrant
- CO = College Accelerator Programme entrant
- NG = Next Gen Accelerator Program entrant
- w/o = Walkover
- r = Retired
- d = Defaulted

First round
1	A Anshba (Czech Republic) A Dețiuc	6	6
(Czech Republic) A Látalová (Czech Republic) B Michálková	3	0
(Czech Republic) V Hažmuková (Czech Republic) J Kareisová	0	1
(Australia) J Fourlis (Czech Republic) D Šalková	6	6
4	(United States) J Aney (Germany) L Papadakis	6	6
(Czech Republic) K Pávková (Czech Republic) D Pospíšilová	1	2
(Australia) P Hon (Japan) H Sakatsume	6	6
(Netherlands) S Lamens; M Melnikova	3	3
(Germany) T Morderger (Germany) Y Morderger	4
(Czech Republic) V Bervid (Dominican Republic) AM Fedotova	1^{r}
(Germany) N Noha Akugue (Germany) E Seidel	6	6
3	(United Kingdom) S Murray Sharan (India) P Thombare	2	2
A Ibragimova (Czech Republic) I Šebestová	6	4	[10]
J Kolodynska (Canada) M Stakusic	2	6	[7]
(Czech Republic) D Hindová (Czech Republic) K Kubáňová	1	2
2	(Czech Republic) M Kolodziejová (Czech Republic) J Malečková	6	6

Quarterfinals
1	A Anshba (Czech Republic) A Dețiuc	3	1
(Australia) J Fourlis (Czech Republic) D Šalková	6	6
4	(United States) J Aney (Germany) L Papadakis	1	6	[10]
(Australia) P Hon (Japan) H Sakatsume	6	0	[4]
(Germany) T Morderger (Germany) Y Morderger	1^{r}
(Germany) N Noha Akugue (Germany) E Seidel	3
A Ibragimova (Czech Republic) I Šebestová	1	6	[6]
2	(Czech Republic) M Kolodziejová (Czech Republic) J Malečková	6	1	[10]

Semifinals
(Australia) J Fourlis (Czech Republic) D Šalková	6	6
4	(United States) J Aney (Germany) L Papadakis	3	3
(Germany) N Noha Akugue (Germany) E Seidel	7	3	[10]
2	(Czech Republic) M Kolodziejová (Czech Republic) J Malečková	5	6	[3]

Final
(Australia) J Fourlis (Czech Republic) D Šalková	5	7	[10]
(Germany) N Noha Akugue (Germany) E Seidel	7	5	[4]
