= 2024 Advantage Cars Prague Open – Men's singles =

Men's singles
- 2024 Advantage Cars Prague Open

Final
- Champion: (Czech Republic) Jiří Veselý
- Runner-up: (Belgium) Gauthier Onclin
- Score: 6–2, 3–6, 7–6^{(7–3)}

Events
Singles	men	women
Doubles	men	women
- Advantage Cars Prague Open

Dominic Stricker was the defending champion but chose not to defend his title.

Jiří Veselý won the title after defeating Gauthier Onclin 6–2, 3–6, 7–6^{(7–3)} in the final.

== Seeds ==
1. (Switzerland) Leandro Riedi (second round)
2. (France) Hugo Grenier (first round)
3. (Argentina) Marco Trungelliti (second round, retired)
4. (Germany) Rudolf Molleker (quarterfinals)
5. (France) Benjamin Bonzi (second round)
6. (United States) Martin Damm (first round)
7. (Czech Republic) Dalibor Svrčina (first round)
8. (Slovakia) Alex Molčan (semifinals, retired)

== Draw ==
Key

- Q = Qualifier
- WC = Wild card
- LL = Lucky loser
- Alt = Alternate
- ITF = ITF entry
- PR = Protected ranking
- SR = Special ranking
- SE = Special exempt
- JE = Junior exempt
- JR = Junior Accelerator Programme entrant
- CO = College Accelerator Programme entrant
- NG = Next Gen Accelerator Program entrant
- w/o = Walkover
- r = Retired
- d = Defaulted

=== Finals ===
Semifinals
WC	(United States) Toby Kodat	2	5
Alt	(Czech Republic) Jiří Veselý	6	7
8	(Slovakia) Alex Molčan	2	0^{r}
(Belgium) Gauthier Onclin	6	1

Final
Alt	(Czech Republic) Jiří Veselý	6	3	7^{7}
(Belgium) Gauthier Onclin	2	6	6^{3}

=== Top half ===
First round
1	(Switzerland) L Riedi	6^{3}	6	6
(Germany) H Squire	7^{7}	4	4
Q	(Czech Republic) M Krumich	3	6	5
(Portugal) H Rocha	6	4	7
(France) M Janvier	3	4
WC	(United States) T Kodat	6	6
Q	(France) C Chidekh	6	5	6
6	(United States) M Damm	4	7	3
3	(Argentina) M Trungelliti	4	6	6
Q	(Georgia (country)) N Basilashvili	6	1	1
(Spain) A Moro Cañas	4	7^{7}	6^{3}
Alt	(Czech Republic) J Veselý	6	6^{5}	7^{7}
LL	(Italy) G Fonio	7^{8}	6
(France) G Blancaneaux	6^{6}	3
WC	(Czech Republic) J Forejtek	3	7	3
5	(France) B Bonzi	6	5	6

Second round
1	(Switzerland) L Riedi	4	4
(Portugal) H Rocha	6	6
WC	(United States) T Kodat	6	2	6
Q	(France) C Chidekh	2	6	1
3	(Argentina) M Trungelliti	1	0^{r}
Alt	(Czech Republic) J Veselý	6	0
LL	(Italy) G Fonio	7^{7}	3	6
5	(France) B Bonzi	6^{4}	6	2

Quarterfinals
(Portugal) H Rocha	1	6^{3}
WC	(United States) T Kodat	6	7^{7}
Alt	(Czech Republic) J Veselý	2	6	6
LL	(Italy) G Fonio	6	1	4

Semifinals
WC	(United States) T Kodat	2	5
Alt	(Czech Republic) J Veselý	6	7

=== Bottom half ===
First round
8	(Slovakia) A Molčan	7^{7}	6
Q	(France) Mathys Erhard	6^{3}	4
Q	(Switzerland) J Paul	2	4
(France) E Couacaud	6	6
(Portugal) J Faria	6	6
WC	(Czech Republic) J Kumstát	4	2
(Spain) N Sánchez Izquierdo	3	1
4	(Germany) R Molleker	6	6
7	(Czech Republic) D Svrčina	3	3
(Spain) O Roca Batalla	6	6
(Netherlands) G Brouwer	2	2
(Belgium) G Onclin	6	6
(France) M Bourgue	4	5
Q	(United Kingdom) F Gill	6	7
(Spain) J Barranco Cosano	6	3	6
2	(France) H Grenier	2	6	1

Second round
8	(Slovakia) A Molčan	7^{9}	6
(France) E Couacaud	6^{7}	4
(Portugal) J Faria	6^{4}	1
4	(Germany) R Molleker	7^{7}	6
(Spain) O Roca Batalla	6^{6}	7^{7}	2
(Belgium) G Onclin	7^{8}	6^{3}	6
Q	(United Kingdom) F Gill	4	6	3
(Spain) J Barranco Cosano	6	3	6

Quarterfinals
8	(Slovakia) A Molčan	6	6
4	(Germany) R Molleker	4	2
(Belgium) G Onclin	6	2	7
(Spain) J Barranco Cosano	3	6	5

Semifinals
8	(Slovakia) A Molčan	2	0^{r}
(Belgium) G Onclin	6	1
