= 2024 Internazionali di Tennis Città di Rovereto – Doubles =

Doubles
- 2024 Internazionali di Tennis Città di Rovereto

Final
- Champions: (India) Sriram Balaji (India) Rithvik Choudary Bollipalli
- Runners-up: (France) Théo Arribagé (Portugal) Francisco Cabral
- Score: 6–3, 2–6, [12–10]

Events
Singles	Doubles
- Internazionali di Tennis Città di Rovereto

Victor Vlad Cornea and Franko Škugor were the defending champions but only Cornea chose to defend his title, partnering Marco Bortolotti. They lost in the first round to Oleg Prihodko and Jelle Sels.

Sriram Balaji and Rithvik Choudary Bollipalli won the title after defeating Théo Arribagé and Francisco Cabral 6–3, 2–6, [12–10] in the final.

== Seeds ==
1. (India) Sriram Balaji / (India) Rithvik Choudary Bollipalli (champions)
2. (France) Théo Arribagé / (Portugal) Francisco Cabral (final)
3. (Germany) Jakob Schnaitter / (Germany) Mark Wallner (semifinals)
4. (Italy) Marco Bortolotti / (Romania) Victor Vlad Cornea (first round)

== Draw ==
Key

- Q = Qualifier
- WC = Wild card
- LL = Lucky loser
- Alt = Alternate
- ITF = ITF entry
- PR = Protected ranking
- SR = Special ranking
- SE = Special exempt
- JE = Junior exempt
- JR = Junior Accelerator Programme entrant
- CO = College Accelerator Programme entrant
- NG = Next Gen Accelerator Program entrant
- w/o = Walkover
- r = Retired
- d = Defaulted

=== Draw ===
First round
1	(India) S Balaji (India) RC Bollipalli	6	6
(Germany) D Masur; A Vatutin	4	3
(France) G Blancaneaux (Italy) G Oradini	6	5	[5]
(Italy) F Romano (Italy) S Travaglia	4	7	[10]
4	(Italy) M Bortolotti (Romania) V Cornea	6	6^{3}	[8]
WC	(Ukraine) O Prihodko (Netherlands) J Sels	4	7^{7}	[10]
(Czech Republic) F Duda (Czech Republic) D Poljak	2	6^{5}
(Sweden) F Bergevi (Denmark) J Ingildsen	6	7^{7}
(Romania) B Pavel (Italy) Augusto Virgili	2	4
(Slovakia) M Karol (Ukraine) V Sachko	6	6
WC	(Italy) A Arnaboldi (Italy) F Arnaboldi	2	1
3	(Germany) J Schnaitter (Germany) M Wallner	6	6
(Bulgaria) A Donski (Spain) B Pujol Navarro	5	1
(Italy) F Maestrelli (Italy) Samuel Vincent Ruggeri	7	6
(Ukraine) D Molchanov (Czech Republic) M Vocel	5	4
2	(France) T Arribagé (Portugal) F Cabral	7	6

Quarterfinals
1	(India) S Balaji (India) RC Bollipalli	6	6
(Italy) F Romano (Italy) S Travaglia	3	2
WC	(Ukraine) O Prihodko (Netherlands) J Sels	7^{7}	3	[12]
(Sweden) F Bergevi (Denmark) J Ingildsen	6^{2}	6	[10]
(Slovakia) M Karol (Ukraine) V Sachko	3	4
3	(Germany) J Schnaitter (Germany) M Wallner	6	6
(Italy) F Maestrelli (Italy) S Vincent Ruggeri	3	2
2	(France) T Arribagé (Portugal) F Cabral	6	6

Semifinals
1	(India) S Balaji (India) RC Bollipalli	w/o
WC	(Ukraine) O Prihodko (Netherlands) J Sels
3	(Germany) J Schnaitter (Germany) M Wallner	6^{6}	6	[7]
2	(France) T Arribagé (Portugal) F Cabral	7^{8}	3	[10]

Final
1	(India) S Balaji (India) RC Bollipalli	6	2	[12]
2	(France) T Arribagé (Portugal) F Cabral	3	6	[10]
