= Giulio Zeppieri =

Italian tennis player

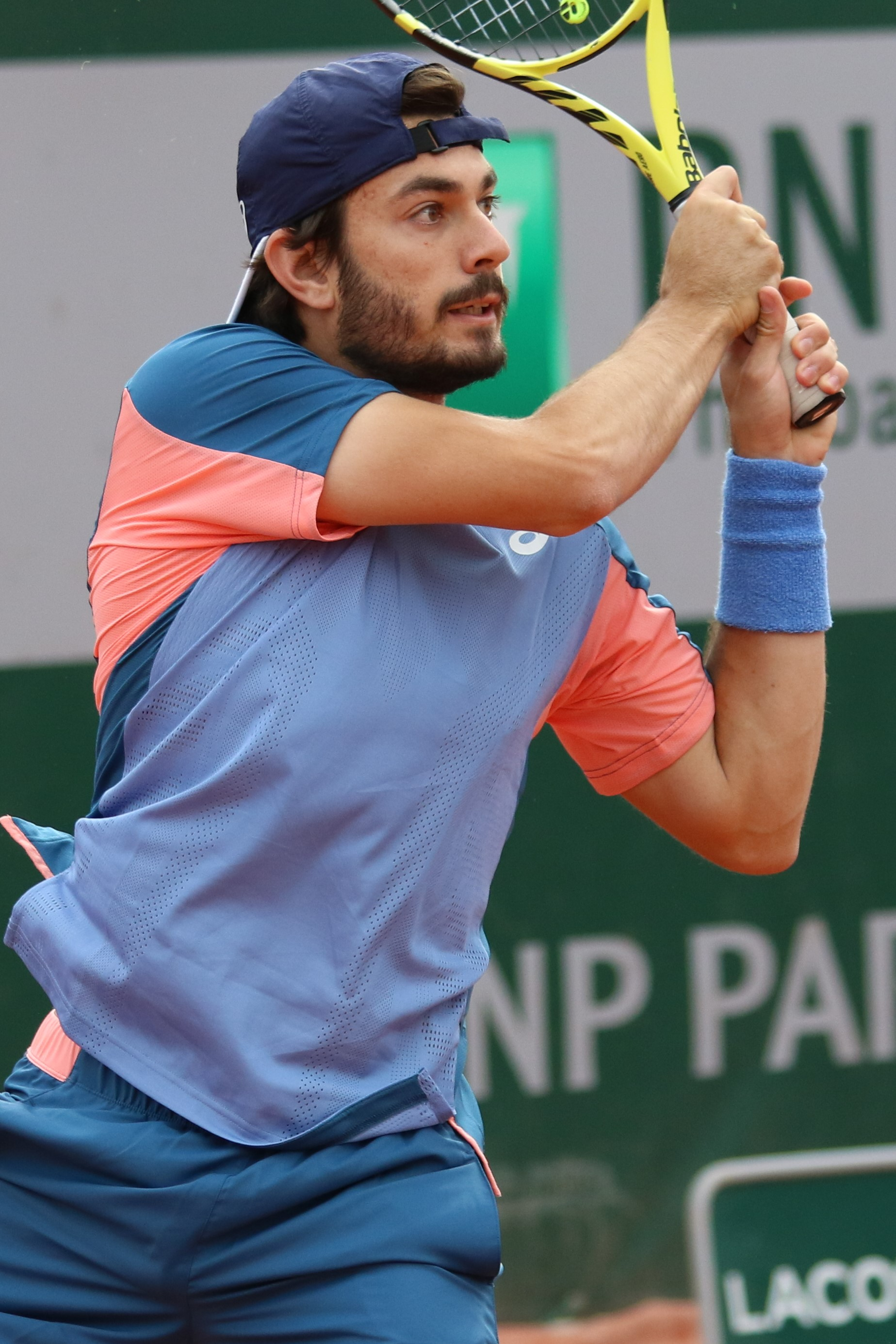
- Zeppieri at the 2022 French Open
- Country (sports): Italy
- Residence: Latina, Italy
- Born: 7 December 2001 (age 24) Rome, Italy
- Height: 1.83 m (6 ft 0 in)
- Turned pro: 2019
- Plays: Left-handed (two-handed backhand)
- Coach: Massimo Sartori, Nicola Ceragioli, Tommaso Castagnola (2025-)
- Prize money: US $1,421,422

Singles
- Career record: 7–20
- Career titles: 0
- Highest ranking: No. 110 (29 January 2024)
- Current ranking: No. 557 (5 October 2026)

Grand Slam singles results
- Australian Open: 2R (2024)
- French Open: 2R (2023, 2024)
- Wimbledon: 1R (2025)
- US Open: Q3 (2023)

Doubles
- Career record: 1–3
- Career titles: 0
- Highest ranking: No. 242 (4 April 2022)
- Last updated on: 15 October 2026.

Giulio Zeppieri (born 7 December 2001) is an Italian professional tennis player. He has a career high ATP singles ranking of world No. 110 achieved on 29 January 2024. He also has a career high ATP doubles ranking of world No. 242 achieved on 4 April 2022.

== Professional career ==
=== 2019: NextGen Finals alternate ===
Zeppieri was one of the alternates for the 2019 Next Generation ATP Finals.

=== 2020-21: ATP debut, First Challenger title, Top 250 debut ===
Zeppieri made his ATP main draw debut at the 2020 Forte Village Sardegna Open after receiving a wildcard for the singles main draw.

In August 2021, he won his first Challenger in Barletta, Italy defeating compatriot Flavio Cobolli. As a result he reached a new career-high inside the top 300 at No. 251 on 30 August 2021 and later inside the top 250 at No. 245 on 20 September 2021.

=== 2022: Major & Masters 1000 debut, first ATP semifinal & top 150 ===
He qualified into the main draw for his first Masters 1000 in Rome on his second attempt defeating 14th seeded Maxime Cressy in the qualifying competition.

He made his Grand Slam debut at the 2022 French Open after qualifying for the main draw with a win over wildcard Frenchman Sean Cuenin.

He recorded his first ATP win as a qualifier at the 2022 Croatia Open Umag over Pedro Cachin. He defeated Daniel Elahi Galán to reach the quarterfinals. Next he defeated Bernabé Zapata Miralles in straight sets to reach his first semifinal of his career. As a result he moved into the top 150 in the rankings on 1 August 2022 at world No. 136.

=== 2023: Second Challenger title, first Major win ===
He won his second Challenger title in Cherbourg defeating Titouan Droguet. The following week he reached another Challenger final at the 2023 Internazionali di Tennis Città di Rovereto. As a result he reached the top 115 on 27 February 2023.

Ranked No. 129 he qualified into the main draw and recorded his first Major win defeating Alexander Bublik at the 2023 French Open.

=== 2024-25: Australian, Wimbledon and top 125 debuts ===
He qualified for the 2024 Australian Open making his debut at this Grand Slam and recorded his first major win over Dušan Lajović. He entered the 2024 Open 13 Provence in Marseille as a lucky loser. He qualified for the 2024 Qatar ExxonMobil Open. He also qualified for the 2024 French Open and defeated 22nd seed Adrian Mannarino in the first round.

Following his wrist surgery in 2024 and using protected ranking, Zeppieri qualified for the main draw at the 2025 French Open, where he lost to eventual champion Carlos Alcaraz, and at the 2025 Wimbledon Championships making his debut at the tournament.

== Performance timeline ==
Key
W	F	SF	QF	#R	RR	Q#	DNQ	A	NH

(W) winner; (F) finalist; (SF) semifinalist; (QF) quarterfinalist; (#R) rounds 4, 3, 2, 1; (RR) round-robin stage; (Q#) qualification round; (DNQ) did not qualify; (A) absent; (NH) not held; (SR) strike rate (events won / competed); (W–L) win–loss record.

=== Singles ===
Tournament	2020	2021	2022	2023	2024	2025	SR	W–L	Win %
Grand Slam tournaments
Australian Open	A	A	A	Q2	2R	Q1	0 / 1	1–1	50%
French Open	A	A	1R	2R	2R	1R	0 / 4	2–4	33%
Wimbledon	NH	A	Q1	Q2	A	1R	0 / 1	0–1	0%
US Open	A	A	Q1	Q3	A	Q2	0 / 0	0–0	–
Win–loss	0–0	0–0	0–2	1–2	2–3	0–3	0 / 10	3–10	23%
ATP Masters 1000
Indian Wells	NH	A	A	A	A	1R	0 / 1	0–1	0%
Miami Open	NH	A	A	A	A	A	0 / 0	0–0	–
Monte-Carlo Masters	NH	A	A	Q1	A	A	0 / 0	0–0	–
Madrid Open	NH	A	A	Q2	Q2	A	0 / 0	0–0	–
Italian Open	Q3	A	1R	1R	1R	Q2	0 / 3	0–3	0%
Canadian Open	NH	A	A	A	A	A	0 / 0	0–0	
Cincinnati Masters	A	A	A	A	A	A	0 / 0	0–0	–
Shanghai Masters	NH			A	A	Q1	0 / 0	0–0	–
Paris Masters	A	A	A	A	A		0 / 0	0–0	–
Win–loss	0–0	0–0	0–1	0–1	0–1	0–1	0 / 4	0–4	0%

== ATP Challenger and ITF Tour Finals ==
=== Singles 7 (4–3) ===
Legend (singles) ATP Challenger Tour (3–2) ITF World Tennis Tour (1–1)	Titles by surface Hard (2–1) Clay (2–2) Grass (0–0) Carpet (0–0)

Result	W–L	Date	Tournament	Tier	Surface	Opponent	Score
Loss	0–1	Jul 2019	M25 Pontedera, Italy	World Tennis Tour	Clay	(Italy) Enrico Dalla Valle	6–7^{(4–7)}, 5–7
Win	1–1	Oct 2019	M25 Santa Margherita Di Pula, Italy	World Tennis Tour	Clay	(Brazil) Bruno Sant'Anna	6–3, 6–2
Win	2–1	Aug 2021	Barletta, Italy	Challenger	Clay	(Italy) Flavio Cobolli	6–1, 3–6, 6–3
Win	3–1	Feb 2023	Cherbourg, France	Challenger	Hard (i)	(France) Titouan Droguet	7–5, 7–6^{(7–4)}
Loss	3–2	Feb 2023	Rovereto, Italy	Challenger	Hard (i)	(Switzerland) Dominic Stricker	6–7^{(8–10)}, 2–6
Loss	3–3	Jul 2023	Karlsruhe, Germany	Challenger	Clay	(Chile) Alejandro Tabilo	6–2, 0–1 ret.
Win	4–3	Sep 2025	Shanghai, China	Challenger	Hard	(Japan) Yasutaka Uchiyama	7–6^{(7–2)}, 7–5

=== Doubles ===
Result	Date	Category	Tournament	Surface	Partner	Opponents	Score
Win	July 2021	Challenger	Todi, Italy	Clay	(Italy) Francesco Forti	(Argentina) Facundo Díaz Acosta (Peru) Alexander Merino	6–3, 6–2
