= 2023 Internazionali di Tennis Città di Rovereto =

- Date: 20–26 February
- Edition: 1st
- Surface: Hard (indoor)
- Location: Rovereto, Italy

Champions

Singles
- (Switzerland) Dominic Stricker

Doubles
- (Romania) Victor Vlad Cornea / (Croatia) Franko Škugor
Internazionali di Tennis Città di Rovereto	· 2024 →

The 2023 Internazionali di Tennis Città di Rovereto was a professional tennis tournament played on indoor hardcourts. It was the first edition of the tournament which was part of the 2023 ATP Challenger Tour. It took place in Rovereto, Italy between 20 and 26 February 2023.

== Singles main draw entrants ==
=== Seeds ===
Country	Player	Rank^{1}	Seed
AUT	Jurij Rodionov	131	1
SUI	Dominic Stricker	153	2
ITA	Giulio Zeppieri	166	3
CZE	Zdeněk Kolář	192	4
ITA	Matteo Gigante	194	5
JPN	Kaichi Uchida	195	6
FRA	Antoine Escoffier	201	7
BEL	Joris De Loore	206	8

- ^{1} Rankings as of 13 February 2023.

=== Other entrants ===
The following players received wildcards into the singles main draw:

- (Italy) Gianmarco Ferrari
- (Italy) Marcello Serafini
- (Italy) Giulio Zeppieri

The following player received entry into the singles main draw as a special exempt:

- (France) ~~Titouan Droguet~~

The following player received entry into the singles main draw as an alternate:

- (Belgium) Raphaël Collignon

The following players received entry from the qualifying draw:

- (Italy) Andrea Arnaboldi
- (France) Mathias Bourgue
- (United Kingdom) Charles Broom
- (China) Bu Yunchaokete
- (Romania) Marius Copil
- (Italy) Stefano Travaglia

The following players received entry as lucky losers:

- Evgeny Donskoy
- (Spain) Alejandro Moro Cañas

== Champions ==
=== Singles ===
- (Switzerland) Dominic Stricker def. (Italy) Giulio Zeppieri 7–6^{(10–8)}, 6–2.

=== Doubles ===
- (Romania) Victor Vlad Cornea / (Croatia) Franko Škugor def. (Ukraine) Vladyslav Manafov / (Ukraine) Oleg Prihodko 6–7^{(3–7)}, 6–2, [10–4].
