= 2026 Internazionali di Tennis Città di Rovereto =

- Date: 12–18 October
- Edition: 2nd
- Category: WTA 125
- Prize money: €100,000
- Surface: Hard (indoor)
- Location: Rovereto, Italy

Champions

Singles
- (Canada) Bianca Andreescu

Doubles
- (Netherlands) Isabelle Haverlag / (Poland) Martyna Kubka
- Internazionali di Tennis Città di Rovereto

The 2026 RoveretOpen Città Della Pace was a professional women's tennis tournament played on indoor hard courts. It was the second edition of the tournament and is part of the 2026 WTA 125 tournaments. It took place at the Circolo Tennis Rovereto in Rovereto, Italy between 12 and 18 October 2026.

== Singles main-draw entrants ==
=== Seeds ===
Country	Player	Rank^{1}	Seed
CRO	Antonia Ružić	83	1
ESP	Oksana Selekhmeteva	101	2
ITA	Lisa Pigato	114	3
ARM	Alina Charaeva	118	4
ITA	Lucrezia Stefanini	125	5
CZE	Dominika Šalková	126	6
ITA	Lucia Bronzetti	132	7
COL	Emiliana Arango	138	8

- ^{1} Rankings are as of 28 September 2026.

=== Other entrants ===
The following players received wildcards into the singles main draw:

- (Italy) Noemi Basiletti
- (Italy) Gaia Maduzzi
- (Italy) Laura Mair
- (Italy) Elisa Visentin

The following players received entry from the qualifying draw:

- Erika Andreeva
- (Croatia) Lea Bošković
- (Germany) Tessa Brockmann
- (Netherlands) Anouk Koevermans

The following player received entry into the main draw as a lucky loser:

- (France) Elsa Jacquemot

=== Withdrawals ===
Before the tournament

- (France) Anna Blinkova → replaced by (France) Harmony Tan
- (Andorra) Victoria Jiménez Kasintseva → replaced by (Slovakia) Viktória Hrunčáková
- (United States) Robin Montgomery → replaced by (Germany) Mona Barthel
- (Serbia) Lola Radivojević → replaced by (France) Elsa Jacquemot (LL)
- (Czech Republic) Vendula Valdmannová → replaced by (Czech Republic) Anna Sisková

=== Retirements ===
Before the tournament

- (Czech Republic) Gabriela Knutson (abdominal strain)
- (Netherlands) Anouk Koevermans (low back injury)

== Doubles entrants ==
=== Seeds ===
Country	Player	Country	Player	Rank	Seed
NED	Isabelle Haverlag	POL	Martyna Kubka	202	1
CZE	Dominika Šalková	CZE	Anna Sisková	209	2
USA	Catherine Harrison	USA	Dalayna Hewitt	221	3
IND	Rutuja Bhosale	BEL	Lara Salden	232	4

- Rankings as of 5 October 2026.

=== Other entrants ===
The following pair received a wildcard into the doubles main draw:

- (Italy) Ana Tamindžić / (Italy) Elisa Visentin

== Champions ==
=== Singles ===
- (Canada) Bianca Andreescu def. (Czech Republic) Dominika Šalková 7–6^{(7–2)}, 6–2

=== Doubles ===
- (Netherlands) Isabelle Haverlag / (Poland) Martyna Kubka def. (Czech Republic) Dominika Šalková / (Czech Republic) Anna Sisková 6–1, 6–2
