= Lucrezia Stefanini =

Italian tennis player (born 1998)

- Stefanini at the 2026 Wimbledon Championships
- Country (sports): Italy
- Born: 15 May 1998 (age 28) Florence, Italy
- Height: 1.64 m (5 ft 5 in)
- Plays: Right (two-handed both sides)
- Prize money: US$ 1,543,915

Singles
- Career record: 380–293
- Career titles: 11 ITF
- Highest ranking: No. 99 (7 August 2023)
- Current ranking: No. 118 (26 October 2026)

Grand Slam singles results
- Australian Open: 2R (2023)
- French Open: 1R (2025)
- Wimbledon: 1R (2023)
- US Open: 2R (2026)

Doubles
- Career record: 53–64
- Career titles: 2 ITF
- Highest ranking: No. 393 (18 April 2022)
- Last updated on: 26 October 2026.

Lucrezia Stefanini (born 15 May 1998) is an Italian tennis player. Stefanini has career-high WTA rankings of 99 in singles and 393 in doubles. She has won eleven singles titles and two doubles titles on the ITF Circuit. She was finalist for Italy in the 2023 Billie Jean King Cup.

== Career ==
=== 2021–2024: WTA Tour & major debuts, top 100 ===
Stefanini made her WTA Tour debut at the 2021 Abu Dhabi Open, qualifying for the main draw by defeating Irina Fetecău in the final qualifying round. She lost to world No. 19 Elena Rybakina in the first round.

Stefanini made her major debut at the 2023 Australian Open. She recorded her first win at this level, defeating Tatjana Maria in three sets, before losing to Varvara Gracheva in the second round.

She received a wildcard entry into the main draw at her home tournament, the WTA 1000 Italian Open in Rome in 2023, losing in the first round to Wang Xiyu. Stefanini reached the WTA top 100 for the first time at world No. 99 on 7 August 2023.

In July 2023 at the Poland Open, Stefanini defeated seventh seed Linda Fruhvirtová and Jodie Burrage to reach her first WTA Tour quarterfinal, which she lost to Laura Siegemund. Three months later at the Jasmin Open in Tunisia, she recorded wins over qualifier Camilla Rosatello and wildcard entrant Katarzyna Kawa to make it into the quarterfinals, where her run was ended by sixth seed Clara Burel.

Again benefitting from a wildcard entry into the main draw at 2024 Italian Open, she defeated countrywoman and fellow wildcard entrant Vittoria Paganetti, before losing to 29th seed Linda Nosková. At the 2024 Guadalajara Open, she qualified for the main draw and defeated Ana Sofía Sánchez in three sets to reach the second round, where she lost to sixth-seeded Marie Bouzková.

=== 2025–2026: Two WTA 125 finals ===
In May 2025, Stefanini qualified to make her main draw debut at the French Open, but lost to Jil Teichmann in the first round. As a qualifier at the 2025 Guadalajara Open, she defeated wildcard entrant Sloane Stephens, before losing to fourth seed Magdalena Fręch in the second round. Stefanini reached her first WTA 125 final at the 2025 Internazionali di Tennis Città di Rovereto, but lost to second seed Oksana Selekhmeteva.

Entering as a qualifier at the 2026 Cincinnati Open, she made it through to a WTA 1000 second round for the first time when Elisabetta Cocciaretto retired due to injury during the first set of their opening round match. Stefanini lost to 22nd seed Marie Bouzková. At the 2026 US Open, she defeated Dayana Yastremska for her first win at this major, before losing to 19th seed and fellow Italian player Jasmine Paolini in the second round.

In October 2026, Stefanini made it into her second WTA 125 final at the Samsun Open In Turkey, but lost to Ayla Aksu in three sets. The following month, seeded 10th at the Chennai Open, she defeated lucky loser Rada Zolotareva and Simona Waltert to reach her third WTA Tour quarterfinal, and first for three years. In the last eight, Stefanini retired due to injury while facing match point, trailing by a set and two breaks of serve, against seventh seed Anastasia Zakharova.

== Performance timeline ==
Key
W	F	SF	QF	#R	RR	Q#	DNQ	A	NH

(W) winner; (F) finalist; (SF) semifinalist; (QF) quarterfinalist; (#R) rounds 4, 3, 2, 1; (RR) round-robin stage; (Q#) qualification round; (DNQ) did not qualify; (A) absent; (NH) not held; (SR) strike rate (events won / competed); (W–L) win–loss record.
To avoid confusion and double counting, these charts are updated at the conclusion of a tournament or when the player's participation has ended.

Only main-draw results in WTA Tour, Grand Slam tournaments, Billie Jean King Cup, United Cup, Hopman Cup and Olympic Games are included in win–loss records.

=== Singles ===
Current through the 2026 Wuhan Open.

Tournament	2019	2020	2021	2022	2023	2024	2025	2026	SR	W–L	Win %
Grand Slam tournaments
Australian Open	A	A	A	Q1	2R	Q1	Q1	Q2	0 / 1	1–1	
French Open	A	A	A	Q1	Q1	Q1	1R	Q2	0 / 1	0–1	
Wimbledon	A	NH	A	Q2	1R	Q1	Q2	Q2	0 / 1	0–1	
US Open	A	A	Q2	Q1	Q2	Q2	Q3	2R	0 / 1	1–1	
Win–loss	0–0	0–0	0–0	0–0	1–2	0–0	0–1	1–1	0 / 4	2–4	
National representation
Billie Jean King Cup	A	A	A	A	F (Note: Stefanini was part of the team, but did not play in singles)	A	A		0 / 1	0–0	
WTA 1000 tournaments
Qatar Open	NTI	A	NTI	A	NTI	A	A	A	0 / 0	0–0	
Dubai Championships	A	NTI	A	NTI	A	A	A	A	0 / 0	0–0	
Indian Wells Open	A	NH	Q1	A	Q1	A	A	Q1	0 / 0	0–0	
Miami Open	A	NH	A	A	A	A	1R	Q1	0 / 1	0–1	
Madrid Open	A	NH	A	A	A	A	Q2	Q1	0 / 0	0–0	
Italian Open	Q1	A	A	A	1R	2R	1R	1R	0 / 4	1–4	
Canadian Open	A	NH	A	A	A	A	A	1R	0 / 1	0–1	
Cincinnati Open	A	A	A	A	A	A	A	2R	0 / 1	1–1	
China Open	A	NH			A	A	Q1	A	0 / 0	0–0	
Wuhan Open	A	NH				A	A	A	0 / 0	0–0	
Win–loss	0–0	0–0	0–0	0–0	0–1	1–1	0–2	1–3	0 / 7	2–7	
Career statistics
	2019	2020	2021	2022	2023	2024	2025	2026	SR	W–L	Win %
Tournaments	0	0	4	3	7	6	7	4	Career total: 14		
Titles	0	0	0	0	0	0	0	0	Career total: 0		
Finals	0	0	0	0	0	0	0	0	Career total: 0		
Hard win–loss	0–0	0–0	1–3	1–1	5–4	2–3	2–4	1–3	0 / 18	12–18	
Clay win–loss	0–0	0–0	0–1	1–2	0–1	1–2	0–2	0–1	0 / 9	2–9	
Grass win–loss	0–0	0–0	0–0	0–0	0–2	1–1	0–0	0–0	0 / 3	1–3	
Overall win–loss	0–0	0–0	1–4	2–3	5–7	4–6	2–6	1–4	0 / 30	15–30	
Year-end ranking (Note: 2015: WTA ranking–926, 2016: WTA ranking–755, 2017: WTA ranking–503, 2018: WTA ranking–407.)	430	390	180	142	119	153	142		$1,161,088		

=== Doubles ===
Current through the 2023 Wimbledon Championships.

Tournament	2021	2022	2023	SR	W–L	Win %
Grand Slam tournaments
Australian Open	A	A	A		0–0	
French Open	A	A	A		0–0	
Wimbledon	A	A	A		0–0	
US Open	A	A	A		0–0	
Win–loss	0–0	0–0	0–0		0–0	
Career statistics
Tournaments	2	1	0	Career total: 3		
Titles	0	0	0	Career total: 0		
Finals	0	0	0	Career total: 0		
Overall win-loss	1–2	0–1	0–0	0 / 3	1–3	
Year-end ranking (Note: 2016: WTA ranking–736, 2017: WTA ranking–638, 2018: WTA ranking–657, 2019: WTA ranking–597, 2020: WTA ranking–585.)	516	580	574			

== WTA 125 finals ==
=== Singles: 2 (runner-ups) ===
Result	W–L	Date	Tournament	Surface	Opponent	Score
Loss	0–1	Oct 2025	Internazionali di Rovereto, Italy	Hard (i)	Oksana Selekhmeteva	1–6, 1–6
Loss	0–2	Oct 2026	Samsun Open, Turkey	Hard	(Turkey) Ayla Aksu	5–7, 6–2, 2–6

== ITF Circuit finals ==
=== Singles: 17 (11 titles, 6 runner-ups) ===
Legend
W100 tournaments (1–0)
W60 tournaments (2–1)
W40/50 tournaments (2–1)
W25 tournaments (4–0)
W10/15 tournaments (2–4)

Result	W–L	Date	Tournament	Tier	Surface	Opponent	Score
Loss	0–1	Jul 2016	ITF Schio, Italy	W10	Clay	(Ukraine) Valeriya Strakhova	3–6, 1–6
Win	1–1	Jun 2017	ITF Hammamet, Tunisia	W15	Clay	(Greece) Eleni Kordolaimi	7–6^{(7–5)}, 6–2
Loss	1–2	Jan 2018	ITF Hammamet, Tunisia	W15	Clay	(Russia) Maria Marfutina	2–6, 1–6
Loss	1–3	Jan 2018	ITF Hammamet, Tunisia	W15	Clay	(United States) Elizabeth Halbauer	3–6, 3–6
Win	2–3	Nov 2019	ITF Monastir, Tunisia	W15	Hard	(Burundi) Sada Nahimana	6–4, 6–0
Loss	2–4	Mar 2021	ITF Monastir, Tunisia	W15	Hard	(Belarus) Jana Kolodynska	6–1, 0–6, 6–7^{(5)}
Win	3–4	May 2021	ITF Salinas, Ecuador	W25	Hard	(Switzerland) Susan Bandecchi	6–1, 6–3
Win	4–4	Aug 2021	ITF Radom, Poland	W25	Clay	(Czech Republic) Miriam Kolodziejová	4–6, 6–2, 6–3
Win	5–4	Feb 2022	ITF Sharm El Sheikh, Egypt	W25	Hard	(Romania) Alexandra Cadanțu-Ignatik	6–2, 3–0 ret.
Win	6–4	Sep 2022	TCCB Open, Switzerland	W60	Clay	(Austria) Sinja Kraus	6–2, 2–1 ret.
Win	7–4	Sep 2022	Caldas da Rainha Ladies Open, Portugal	W60+H	Hard	(Spain) Marina Bassols Ribera	3–6, 6–1, 7–6^{(3)}
Loss	7–5	Jan 2023	Porto Indoor, Portugal	W40	Hard (i)	(Switzerland) Céline Naef	2–6, 4–6
Win	8–5	Apr 2023	ITF Sharm El Sheikh, Egypt	W25	Hard	(United States) Emina Bektas	6–3, 7–6^{(5)}
Win	9–5	Apr 2023	ITF Calvi, France	W40+H	Hard	(United Kingdom) Heather Watson	6–2, 3–6, 6–3
Loss	9–6	Sep 2023	TCCB Open, Switzerland	W60	Clay	(France) Chloé Paquet	2–6, 1–6
Win	10–6	Jun 2024	ITF Montemor-o-Novo, Portugal	W50	Hard	(Australia) Talia Gibson	6–4, 6–0
Win	11–6	Jun 2026	Cary Tennis Classic, United States	W100	Hard	(United States) Savannah Broadus	6–3, 6–2

=== Doubles: 6 (2 titles, 4 runner-ups) ===
Legend
W100 tournaments (0–1)
$10/15,000 tournaments (2–3)

Result	W–L	Date	Tournament	Tier	Surface	Partner	Opponents	Score
Loss	0–1	Jun 2016	ITF Sassuolo, Italy	10,000	Clay	(Italy) Tatiana Pieri	(Italy) Alice Balducci (Italy) Deborah Chiesa	4–6, 2–6
Win	1–1	Sep 2016	ITF Pula, Italy	10,000	Clay	(Italy) Tatiana Pieri	(Italy) Alice Balducci (Italy) Marcella Cucca	6–4, 6–0
Win	2–1	Feb 2017	ITF Bergamo, Italy	15,000	Clay	(Italy) Tatiana Pieri	(Italy) Martina Colmegna (Switzerland) Ylena In-Albon	3–6, 6–3, [10–6]
Loss	2–2	Aug 2017	ITF Porto, Portugal	15,000	Clay	(Italy) Gaia Sanesi	(United Kingdom) Emily Arbuthnott (Denmark) Emilie Francati	4–6, 3–6
Loss	2–3	Aug 2017	ITF Vienna, Austria	15,000	Clay	(Mexico) Ana Sofía Sánchez	(Italy) Anastasia Grymalska (Italy) Dalila Spiteri	6–0, 3–6, [8–10]
Loss	2–4	Apr 2022	U.S. Clay Court Championships	W100	Clay	(Romania) Irina Bara	(United States) Sophie Chang (United States) Angela Kulikov	4–6, 6–3, [8–10]
