= Dominika Šalková =

Czech tennis player (born 2004)

- Šalková at the 2026 Wimbledon Championships
- Country (sports): Czech Republic
- Born: 28 June 2004 (age 22)
- Plays: Right (two-handed backhand)
- Prize money: US$ 673,703

Singles
- Career record: 184–120
- Career titles: 1 WTA 125
- Highest ranking: No. 108ª (19 October 2026)
- Current ranking: No. 108ª (19 October 2026)

Grand Slam singles results
- Australian Open: Q3 (2024)
- French Open: Q2 (2024, 2026)
- Wimbledon: Q2 (2024)
- US Open: Q3 (2025)

Doubles
- Career record: 106–54
- Career titles: 2 WTA 125
- Highest ranking: No. 112 (30 March 2026)
- Current ranking: No. 127 (19 October 2026)

Team competitions
- BJK Cup: 1–0
- Last updated on: 20 October 2026.

Dominika Šalková (born 28 June 2004) is a Czech tennis player. She has a career-high WTA singles ranking of 108, achieved on 26 October 2026, and a best doubles ranking of world No. 112, achieved on 30 March 2026. Šalková has won one singles title and two doubles titles on WTA 125 tournaments.

== Career ==
=== 2022–2024: WTA Tour debut ===
Šálková qualified to make her WTA Tour singles main-draw debut at the 2022 Prague Open. She defeated Ylena In-Albon in straight sets to reach the second round, where she lost to eventual champion and compatriot Marie Bouzková, also in straight sets.

Playing with Barbora Palicová as wildcard entrant at the 2023 Prague Open, she reached the semifinals.

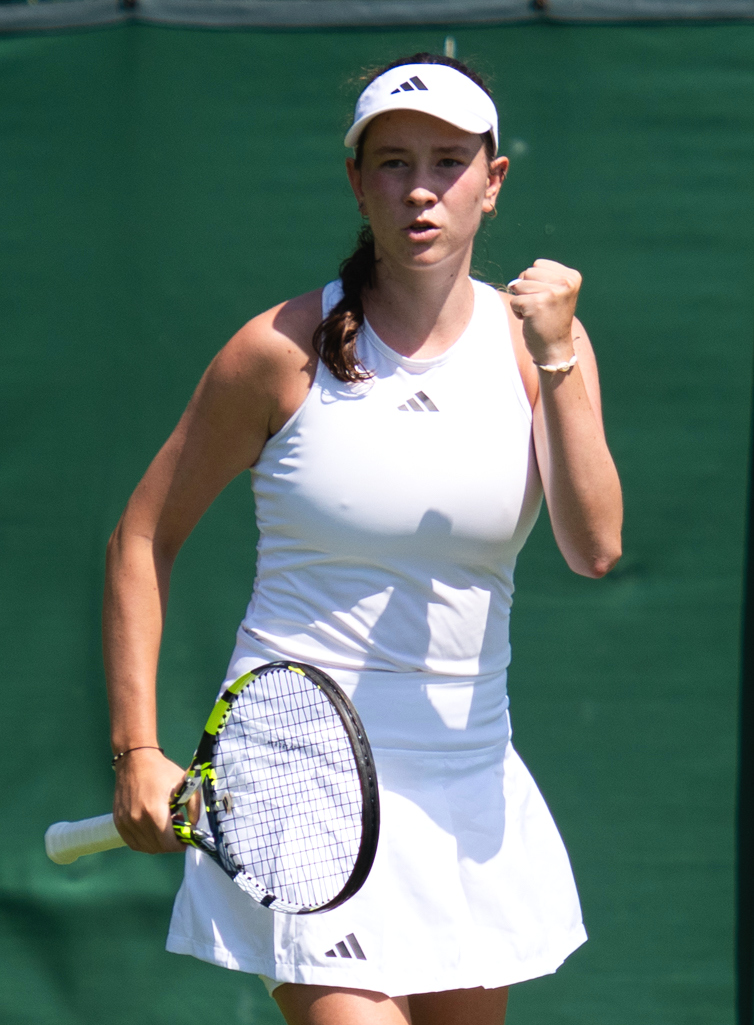
Šalková at Wimbledon, 2024

In January 2024, Šálková entered her first qualifying event for a Grand Slam tournament at the Australian Open and recorded two wins, before losing to Storm Hunter, in three sets.

Šálková obtained direct entry into the main draw of the 2024 Prague Open and defeated Zeynep Sönmez, before retiring in the third set of her second round match against sixth seed Magdalena Fręch.

She reached the semifinals at the WTA 125 event in Angers, at which stage she lost to former world No. 4, Belinda Bencic.

=== 2025: First WTA Tour semifinal in singles ===
Šálková qualified for the Singapore Open and defeated Erika Andreeva in straight sets for her first win over a top-100 ranked player, before losing to sixth seed Camila Osorio in three sets.

She made her debut for the Czech BJK Cup team during their qualifying round match against Spain, combining with Tereza Valentová in the doubles to defeat Yvonne Cavallé Reimers and Guiomar Maristany.

Partnered with Veronika Erjavec, Šalková reached her maiden WTA 125 doubles final at the Città di Grado Tennis Cup, losing to Quinn Gleason and Ingrid Martins in a deciding champions tiebreak.

She received a wildcard entry into the Prague Open main draw and defeated fellow wildcard entrant Laura Samson, before losing to Kateřina Siniaková in the second round.

Partnered with Weronika Falkowska, Šálková won her first WTA 125 doubles title at the Polish Open, defeating Isabelle Haverlag and Martyna Kubka in the final.

At the US Open, Šálková reached the final round of qualification for the first time in her career, but lost to Rebecca Marino in three sets.

Šálková gained direct entry into the main draw at the Jiangxi Open and reached her first WTA Tour semifinal with wins over qualifier Aliona Falei, eighth seed Anastasia Zakharova and Bai Zhuoxuan, before losing to eventual champion Anna Blinkova.

=== 2026: Doubles final, WTA 125 singles title ===
At the Ostrava Open, Šalková partnered with Lucie Havlíčková to reach her first tour doubles final, which they lost to fourth seeds Anastasia Dețiuc and Sabrina Santamaria, in straight sets.

Seeded eighth, Šálková won her first WTA 125 singles title in Les Sables d'Olonne, defeating Andrea Lázaro García in the final.

She won her second WTA 125 doubles title at the Dubrovnik Open playing with Anastasia Dețiuc in an all-Czech final, against top seeds Miriam Škoch and Jesika Malečková.

At the 2026 SP Open, she upset sixth seed Jéssica Bouzas Maneiro for her third top-100 win of the season.

== Performance timelines ==
Key
W	F	SF	QF	#R	RR	Q#	P#	DNQ	A	Z#	PO	G	S	B	NMS	NTI	P	NH

(W) winner; (F) finalist; (SF) semifinalist; (QF) quarterfinalist; (#R) rounds 4, 3, 2, 1; (RR) round-robin stage; (Q#) qualification round; (P#) preliminary round; (DNQ) did not qualify; (A) absent; (Z#) Davis/Fed Cup Zonal Group (with number indication) or (PO) play-off; (G) gold, (S) silver or (B) bronze Olympic/Paralympic medal; (NMS) not a Masters tournament; (NTI) not a Tier I tournament; (P) postponed; (NH) not held; (SR) strike rate (events won / competed); (W–L) win–loss record.
To avoid confusion and double counting, these charts are updated at the conclusion of a tournament or when the player's participation has ended.

Only main-draw results in WTA Tour, Grand Slam tournaments, Billie Jean King Cup, United Cup, Hopman Cup and Olympic Games are included in win–loss records.

=== Singles ===
Current through the 2026 Cincinnati Open.

Tournament	2022	2023	2024	2025	2026	SR	W–L	Win %
Grand Slam tournaments
Australian Open	A	A	Q3	Q1	Q2	0 / 0	0–0	–
French Open	A	A	Q2	Q1	Q2	0 / 0	0–0	–
Wimbledon	A	A	Q2	A	Q1	0 / 0	0–0	–
US Open	A	A	A	Q3	Q2	0 / 0	0–0	–
Win–Loss	0–0	0–0	0–0	0–0	0–0	0 / 0	0–0	–
WTA 1000 tournaments
Madrid Open	A	A	A	A	Q2	0 / 0	0–0	–
Italian Open	A	A	A	A	Q1	0 / 0	0–0	–
Cincinnati Open	A	A	A	A	Q1	0 / 0	0–0	–
Career statistics
Tournaments	1	0	1	3	3	Career total: 8		
Overall Win–Loss	1–1	0–0	1–1	5–3	3–3	0 / 8	10–8	56%
Year-end ranking	317	254	164	132				

=== Doubles ===
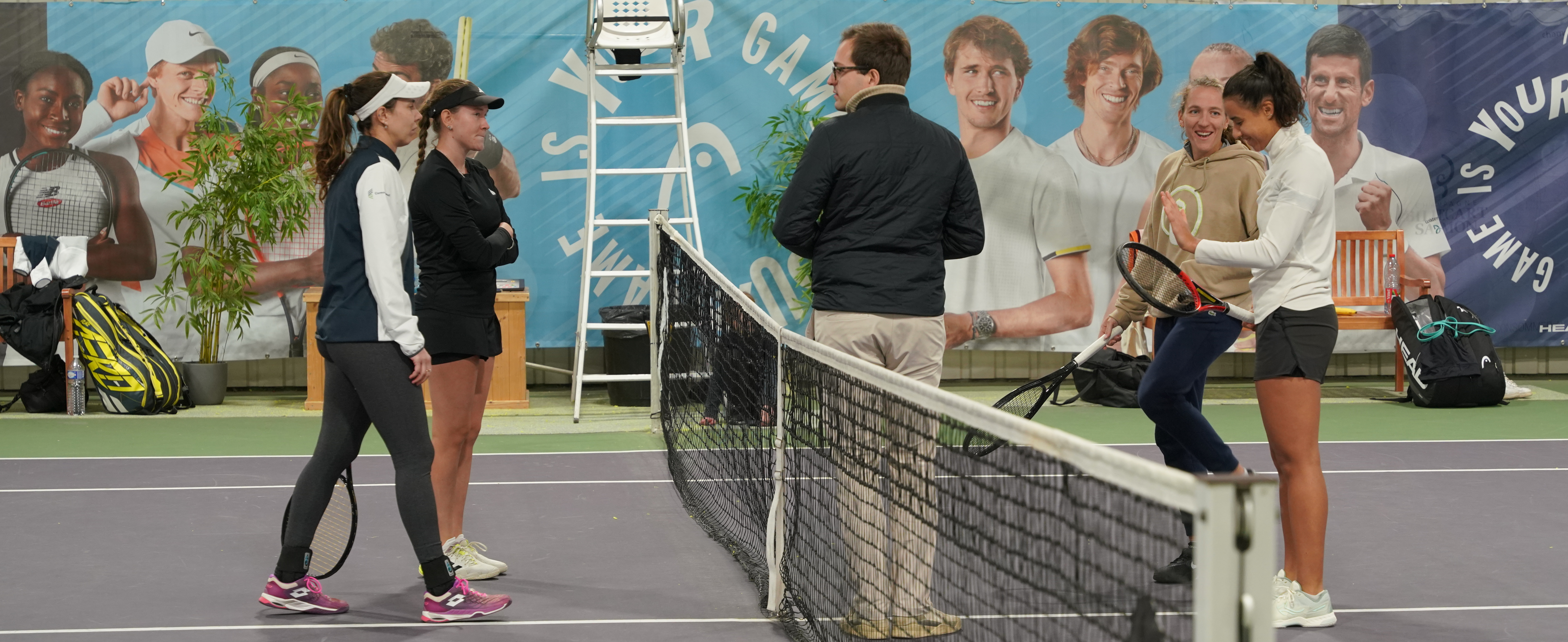
Playing with Mihaela Buzărnescu, Championnats de France de tennis interclubs.

Current through the 2026 Prague Open.

Tournament	2022	2023	2024	2025	2026	SR	W–L	Win%
Grand Slam tournaments
Australian Open	A	A	A	A	A	0 / 0	0–0	–
French Open	A	A	A	A	A	0 / 0	0–0	–
Wimbledon	A	A	A	A	A	0 / 0	0–0	–
US Open	A	A	A	A		0 / 0	0–0	–
Win–Loss	0–0	0–0	0–0	0–0	0–0	0 / 0	0–0	–
Career statistics
Tournaments	1	1	1	3	3	Career total: 9		
Titles	0	0	0	0	0	Career total: 0		
Finals	0	0	0	0	1	Career total: 1		
Overall Win–Loss	0–1	2–1	1–0	4–3	4–2	0 / 9	11–7	61%

== WTA Tour finals ==
=== Doubles: 1 (runner-up) ===
Legend WTA 250 (0–1)	Finals by surface Hard (0–1)	Finals by setting Indoor (0–1)

Result	Date	Tournament	Tier	Surface	Partner	Opponents	Score
Loss	Feb 2026	Ostrava Open, Czech Republic	WTA 250	Hard (i)	(Czech Republic) Lucie Havlíčková	(Czech Republic) Anastasia Dețiuc (United States) Sabrina Santamaria	4–6, 6–7^{(4–7)}

== WTA 125 finals ==
=== Singles: 2 (1 title, 1 runner-up) ===
Result	W–L	Date	Tournament	Surface	Opponents	Score
Win	1–0	Feb 2026	Open Les Sables d'Olonne, France	Hard (i)	(Spain) Andrea Lázaro García	6–4, 6–0
Loss	1–1	Oct 2026	Internazionali di Rovereto, Italy	Hard (i)	(Canada) Bianca Andreescu	6–7^{(2–7)}, 2–6

=== Doubles: 4 (2 titles, 2 runner-ups) ===
Result	W–L	Date	Tournament	Surface	Partner	Opponents	Score
Loss	0–1	Jun 2025	Grado Tennis Cup, Italy	Clay	(Slovenia) Veronika Erjavec	(United States) Quinn Gleason (Brazil) Ingrid Martins	2–6, 7–5, [5–10]
Win	1–1	Jul 2025	Polish Open, Poland	Hard	(Poland) Weronika Falkowska	(Netherlands) Isabelle Haverlag (Poland) Martyna Kubka	6–2, 6–1
Win	2–1	Mar 2026	Dubrovnik Open, Croatia	Clay	(Czech Republic) Anastasia Dețiuc	(Czech Republic) Jesika Malečková (Czech Republic) Miriam Škoch	7–5, 6–4
Loss	2–2	Oct 2026	Internazionali di Rovereto, Italy	Hard (i)	(Czech Republic) Anna Sisková	(Netherlands) Isabelle Haverlag (Poland) Martyna Kubka	1–6, 2–6

== ITF Circuit finals ==
=== Singles: 7 (7 titles) ===
Legend W75 tournaments (3–0) W40 tournaments (1–0) W25 tournaments (3–0)	Finals by surface Hard (3–0) Clay (4–0)

Result	W–L	Date	Tournament	Tier	Surface	Opponent	Score
Win	1–0	May 2022	ITF Osijek, Croatia	W25	Clay	(Croatia) Antonia Ružić	6–1, 6–2
Win	2–0	Oct 2023	ITF Seville, Spain	W25	Clay	(France) Loïs Boisson	6–4, 6–3
Win	3–0	Oct 2023	ITF Loulé, Portugal	W25	Hard	(Italy) Silvia Ambrosio	6–1, 6–2
Win	4–0	Nov 2023	ITF Funchal, Portugal	W40	Hard	(Croatia) Lea Bošković	4–6, 7–5, 6–3
Win	5–0	Mar 2024	Branik Maribor Open, Slovenia	W75	Hard (i)	(Australia) Talia Gibson	6–2, 6–4
Win	6–0	May 2024	Prague Open, Czech Republic	W75	Clay	(Poland) Maja Chwalińska	6–3, 6–0
Win	7–0	Jun 2025	Zagreb Ladies Open, Croatia	W75	Clay	(Croatia) Tara Würth	2–6, 6–3, 6–3

=== Doubles: 15 (11 titles, 4 runner-ups) ===
Legend W100 tournaments (0–1) W60/75 tournaments (2–2) W40/50 tournaments (4–0) W25/35 tournaments (4–1) W15 tournaments (1–0)	Finals by surface Hard (5–1) Clay (6–3)

Result	W–L	Date	Tournament	Tier	Surface	Partner	Opponents	Score
Win	1–0	Apr 2022	ITF Sharm El Sheikh, Egypt	W15	Hard	(Czech Republic) Linda Klimovičová	(Japan) Mei Hasegawa (Japan) Saki Imamura	6–1, 6–4
Loss	1–1	Sep 2022	Prague Open, Czech Republic	W60	Clay	(Czech Republic) Linda Klimovičová	(France) Elixane Lechemia (Germany) Julia Lohoff	5–7, 5–7
Win	2–1	Sep 2022	ITF Frýdek-Místek, Czech Republic	W25	Clay	(Czech Republic) Miriam Kolodziejová	(Japan) Funa Kozaki (Japan) Misaki Matsuda	6–2, 6–3
Win	3–1	Jan 2023	ITF Tallinn, Estonia	W40	Hard (i)	(Czech Republic) Lucie Havlíčková	(Italy) Deborah Chiesa (Italy) Lisa Pigato	7–5, 4–6, [13–11]
Loss	3–2	Feb 2023	GB Pro-Series Glasgow, United Kingdom	W25	Hard (i)	(Czech Republic) Anna Sisková	(United Kingdom) Maia Lumsden (United Kingdom) Ella McDonald	6–3, 1–6, [11–13]
Win	4–2	Apr 2023	ITF Osijek, Croatia	W25	Clay	(Czech Republic) Julie Štruplová	(Czech Republic) Denisa Hindová (Czech Republic) Karolína Kubáňová	6–3, 6–4
Win	5–2	May 2023	ITF Otočec, Slovenia	W40	Clay	(Slovenia) Veronika Erjavec	(Croatia) Mariana Dražić (United Kingdom) Emily Webley-Smith	7–5, 6–3
Loss	5–3	Jun 2023	ITF Říčany, Czech Republic	W60	Clay	(Slovenia) Veronika Erjavec	(Czech Republic) Karolína Kubáňová (Czech Republic) Aneta Kučmová	6–4, 3–6, [4–10]
Win	6–3	Jul 2023	ITF Tarvisio, Italy	W25	Clay	(Slovenia) Veronika Erjavec	(Slovenia) Nika Radišić (Bosnia and Herzegovina) Anita Wagner	6–0, 6–3
Win	7–3	Oct 2023	ITF Loulé, Portugal	W25	Hard	(Hungary) Natália Szabanin	Daria Khomutsianskaya; Evialina Laskevich	4–6, 6–2, [10–1]
Win	8–3	Feb 2024	Porto Indoor, Portugal	W50	Hard (i)	(Slovenia) Veronika Erjavec	(Portugal) Francisca Jorge (Portugal) Matilde Jorge	4–6, 7–5, [10–8]
Win	9–3	Apr 2024	Koper Open, Slovenia	W75	Clay	(Slovenia) Veronika Erjavec	(Greece) Sapfo Sakellaridi (Italy) Aurora Zantedeschi	6–1, 6–3
Win	10–3	May 2024	Prague Open, Czech Republic	W75	Clay	(Australia) Jaimee Fourlis	(Germany) Noma Noha Akugue (Germany) Ella Seidel	5–7, 7–5, [10–4]
Win	11–3	Nov 2024	Trnava Indoor, Slovakia	W50	Hard (i)	(Czech Republic) Julie Štruplová	(Turkey) İpek Öz (Croatia) Tara Würth	6–4, 6–4
Loss	11–4	Aug 2026	Gran Canaria Tour, Spain	W100	Clay	(Sweden) Lisa Zaar	(Czech Republic) Anna Sisková (Kazakhstan) Zhibek Kulambayeva	3–6, 6–7^{(3–7)}

== Junior finals ==
=== ITF Circuit finals ===
==== Singles: 8 (4 titles, 4 runner-ups) ====
Legend
Grade 1 / B1 (1–0)
Grade 2 (0–1)
Grade 3 (1–0)
Grade 4 (2–3)
Grade 5 (0–0)

Result	W–L	Date	Tournament	Tier	Surface	Opponent	Score
Win	1–0	Jan 2019	ITF Prague, Czech Republic	Grade 4	Hard	(Czech Republic) Linda Klimovičová	6–2, 6–4
Loss	1–1	May 2019	ITF Budapest, Hungary	Grade 4	Clay	(Poland) Aleksandra Wierzbowska	2–6, 3–6
Loss	1–2	Jul 2019	ITF Véska, Czech Republic	Grade 4	Clay	(Slovakia) Radka Zelníčková	w/o
Loss	1–3	Sep 2020	ITF Prague, Czech Republic	Grade 4	Clay	(Czech Republic) Lucie Havlíčková	6–3, 3–6, 1–6
Win	2–3	May 2021	ITF Budapest, Hungary	Grade 4	Clay	(Czech Republic) Tereza Valentová	6–1, 6–1
Win	3–3	May 2021	ITF Čakovec, Croatia	Grade 3	Clay	(Slovakia) Vanda Vargová	7–6^{(7–1)}, 6–1
Win	4–3	Jun 2021	ITF Bytom, Poland	Grade 1	Clay	(Russia) Ksenia Zaytseva	6–4, 7–6^{(7–2)}
Loss	4–4	Feb 2022	ITF Šiauliai, Lithuania	Grade 2	Hard	(Germany) Ella Seidel	3–6, 3–6

==== Doubles: 9 (5 titles, 4 runner-ups) ====
Legend
Grade A (0–0)
Grade 1 / B1 (0–1)
Grade 2 (2–2)
Grade 3 (2–0)
Grade 4 (1–1)
Grade 5 (0–0)

Result	W–L	Date	Tournament	Tier	Surface	Partner	Opponents	Score
Loss	0–1	May 2019	ITF Budapest, Hungary	Grade 4	Clay	(Czech Republic) Terezie Pluharova	(Hungary) Anastasia Petrova (Poland) Aleksandra Wierzbowska	4–6, 2–6
Win	1–1	Mar 2020	ITF Trnava, Slovakia	Grade 3	Hard	(Czech Republic) Katerina Mandliková	(Czech Republic) Julie Struplová (Slovakia) Yvonna Zuffová	6–4, 6–1
Win	2–1	Sep 2020	ITF Plzeň, Czech Republic	Grade 2	Clay	(Czech Republic) Linda Klimovičová	(Switzerland) Alina Granwehr (Germany) Laura Isabel Putz	6–4, 6–3
Win	3–1	Sep 2020	ITF Prague, Czech Republic	Grade 4	Clay	(Czech Republic) Nelly Knezková	(Czech Republic) Sára Bejlek (Czech Republic) Lucie Havlíčková	0–6, 6–1, [12–10]
Win	4–1	May 2021	ITF Čakovec, Croatia	Grade 3	Clay	(Czech Republic) Julie Struplová	(Czech Republic) Kristyna Tomajková (Slovakia) Vanda Vargová	6–4, 6–1
Loss	4–2	Jul 2021	ITF Plzeň, Czech Republic	Grade 2	Clay	(Czech Republic) Brenda Fruhvirtová	(Turkey) Aysegul Mert (Turkey) Ozlem Uslu	6–2, 4–6, [10–12]
Loss	4–3	Aug 2021	ITF Budapest, Hungary	Grade 2	Clay	(Serbia) Tijana Sretenović	(Italy) Virginia Ferrara (Italy) Georgia Pedone	3–6, 6–7^{(6–8)}
Win	5–3	Feb 2022	ITF Šiauliai, Lithuania	Grade 2	Hard	(Czech Republic) Tereza Valentová	(Lithuania) Patricija Paukstyte (Germany) Ella Seidel	6–4, 6–1
Loss	5–4	Apr 2022	ITF Plovdiv, Bulgaria	Grade 1	Clay	(Czech Republic) Julie Struplová	(Belgium) Sofia Costoulas (Belgium) Amelie van Impe	6–2, 5–7, [6–10]
