= Silvia Ambrosio =

Italian tennis player (born 1997)

- Country (sports): Italy (2023–present); Germany (2019–2023)
- Born: 24 January 1997 (age 29) Giessen, Germany
- Plays: Right (two-handed backhand)
- College: Marquette; Purdue
- Prize money: $158,320

Singles
- Career record: 228–133
- Career titles: 4 ITF
- Highest ranking: No. 203 (27 October 2025)
- Current ranking: No. 415 (31 August 2026)

Grand Slam singles results
- Australian Open: Q2 (2026)

Doubles
- Career record: 75–57
- Career titles: 5 ITF
- Highest ranking: No. 224 (27 October 2025)
- Current ranking: No. 393 (31 August 2026)
- Last updated on: 10 September 2026.

Silvia Ambrosio (born 24 January 1997) is an Italian professional tennis player. She has career-high rankings of world No. 203 in singles and No. 224 in doubles, both achieved on 27 October 2025. She played collegiate tennis at Marquette University and Purdue University.

== Early life ==
Ambrosio was born in Giessen. She represented Germany until 2023, when she became an Italian citizen. Her father, Giovanni, was also a tennis player.

== Career ==
Ambrosio played collegiate tennis for the Marquette Golden Eagles from 2015 to 2017. In her first year of university, she was named the Big East Freshman of the Year for women's tennis. After two seasons at Marquette, she transferred to Purdue University.

She won her first major ITF title at the W50 in Mâcon in the doubles draw, partnering Lena Papadakis.

In 2025, she reached the WTA Challenger finals twice in doubles both times partnering compatriots Nuria Brancaccio, and then Aurora Zantedeschi, first in September at the Tolentino Open, then in October at the WTA 125 in Rovereto. Defeating second seeded entrants on their way to the final stage, eventually they were defeated in finals by Czech players Jesika Malečková and Miriam Škoch on the both occasions.

== WTA 125 finals ==
=== Doubles: 2 (runner-ups) ===
Result	Date	Tournament	Surface	Partner	Opponents	Score
Loss	Sep 2025	Tolentino Open, Italy	Clay	(Italy) Nuria Brancaccio	(Czech Republic) Jesika Malečková (Czech Republic) Miriam Škoch	3–6, 6–3, [8–10]
Loss	Oct 2025	Internazionali di Rovereto, Italy	Hard (i)	(Italy) Aurora Zantedeschi	(Czech Republic) Jesika Malečková (Czech Republic) Miriam Škoch	0–6, 6–4, [4–10]

== ITF Circuit finals ==
=== Singles: 12 (4 titles, 8 runner-ups) ===
Legend W75 tournaments (0–1) W50 tournaments (0–1) W25/35 tournaments (2–3) W15 tournaments (2–3)	Finals by surface Hard (2–3) Clay (2–5)

Result	W–L	Date	Tournament	Tier	Surface	Opponent	Score
Loss	0–1	Apr 2022	ITF Antalya, Turkey	W15	Clay	(Russia) Mirra Andreeva	5–7, 2–6
Win	1–1	May 2022	ITF Annenheim, Austria	W15	Clay	(Poland) Valeriia Olianovskaia	6–1, 6–4
Loss	1–2	Nov 2022	ITF Heraklion, Greece	W15	Clay	(Ukraine) Oleksandra Oliynykova	3–6, 5–7
Win	2–2	Dec 2022	ITF Monastir, Tunisia	W25	Hard	(France) Alice Robbe	4–6, 6–0, 7–5
Win	3–2	Sep 2023	ITF Frýdek-Místek, Czech Republic	W25	Clay	(Czech Republic) Julie Štruplová	6–0, 6–2
Loss	3–3	Oct 2023	ITF Loulé, Portugal	W25	Clay	(Czech Republic) Dominika Šalková	1–6, 2–6
Loss	3–4	Dec 2023	ITF Limassol, Cyprus	W25	Hard	(Belgium) Sofia Costoulas	1–6, 3–6
Loss	3–5	Dec 2024	ITF Ortisei, Italy	W35	Hard (i)	(Poland) Weronika Falkowska	4–6, 5–7
Loss	3–6	Feb 2025	ITF Monastir, Tunisia	W15	Hard	(Italy) Camilla Zanolini	4–6, 4–6
Win	4–6	Feb 2025	ITF Monastir, Tunisia	W15	Hard	(Italy) Aurora Zantedeschi	6–4, 6–1
Loss	4–7	Apr 2025	Bellinzona Ladies Open, Switzerland	W75	Clay	(Argentina) Solana Sierra	4–6, 0–6
Loss	4–8	Aug 2025	ITF Oldenzaal, Netherlands	W50	Clay	(Germany) Noma Noha Akugue	6–7^{(7)}, 6–7^{(5)}

=== Doubles: 10 (5 titles, 5 runner-ups) ===
Legend W50 tournaments W25/35 tournaments W15 tournaments	Finals by surface Hard (3–1) Clay (1–4) Carpet (1–0)

Result	W–L	Date	Tournament	Tier	Surface	Partner	Opponents	Score
Loss	0–1	Mar 2022	ITF Sharm El Sheikh, Egypt	W15	Hard	(Romania) Elena-Teodora Cadar	(Japan) Hiromi Abe (Czech Republic) Ivana Šebestová	4–6, 6–1, [4–10]
Win	1–1	Oct 2022	ITF Heraklion, Greece	W15	Clay	(Czech Republic) Ivana Šebestová	(Romania) Simona Ogescu (Greece) Dimitra Pavlou	7–5, 7–5
Loss	1–2	Nov 2022	ITF Heraklion, Greece	W15	Clay	(Greece) Eleni Christofi	(Romania) Ilinca Amariei (Greece) Elena Korokozidi	5–7, 6–7^{(5)}
Loss	1–3	Mar 2023	ITF Mosquera, Colombia	W25	Clay	(Germany) Lena Papadakis	(Russia) Irina Khromacheva (Ukraine) Valeriya Strakhova	7–5, 6–7^{(3)}, [8–10]
Win	2–3	Mar 2024	ITF Mâcon, France	W50	Hard (i)	(Germany) Lena Papadakis	(United Kingdom) Madeleine Brooks (Netherlands) Isabelle Haverlag	5–7, 7–5, [10–7]
Loss	2–4	Sep 2024	ITF Santa Margherita di Pula, Italy	W35	Clay	(Czech Republic) Julie Štruplová	(Poland) Daria Kuczer (Sweden) Lisa Zaar	walkover
Win	3–4	Nov 2024	ITF Solarino, Italy	W35	Carpet	(Italy) Sofia Rocchetti	(Italy) Giulia Monteleone (Poland) Oliwia Szymczuch	6–1, 6–3
Loss	3–5	Jan 2025	ITF Buenos Aires, Argentina	W35	Clay	(Italy) Verena Meliss	(Italy) Anastasia Abbagnato (Italy) Nicole Fossa Huergo	6–3,4–6, [8–10]
Win	4–5	Feb 2025	ITF Monastir, Tunisia	W15	Hard	(Germany) Katharina Hobgarski	(Austria) Arabella Koller (Belgium) Eliessa Vanlangendonck	6–3, 6–3
Win	5–5	Feb 2025	ITF Monastir, Tunisia	W15	Hard	(Germany) Katharina Hobgarski	(United States) Julia Adams (United States) Lilian Poling	6–4, 6–7^{(4)}, [10–4]
