= Internazionali di Tennis Città di Rovereto =

- 2026 Internazionali di Tennis Città di Rovereto

Tournament information
- Event name: RoveretOpen Città Della Pace (WTA), Trofeo Perrel-FAIP Rovereto (ATP in 2024)
- Location: Rovereto, Italy
- Venue: Circolo Tennis Rovereto
- Surface: Hard (indoor)
- Website: website

Current champions (2026)
- Women's singles: (Canada) Bianca Andreescu
- Women's doubles: (Netherlands) Isabelle Haverlag (Poland) Martyna Kubka
ATP Tour
- Category: ATP Challenger 100
- Draw: 32S / 24Q / 16D
- Prize money: €120,950
WTA Tour
- Category: WTA 125
- Draw: 32S / 16Q / 16D
- Prize money: €100,000

The Internazionali di Tennis Città di Rovereto is a professional tennis tournament played on indoor hardcourts. It is currently part of the Women's Tennis Association (WTA) 125 tournaments. It has been held in Rovereto, Italy since 2025. It was also part of the Association of Tennis Professionals (ATP) Challenger Tour in 2023 and in 2024.

== Past finals ==
=== Women's singles ===
Year	Champion	Runner-up	Score
2026	(Canada) Bianca Andreescu	(Czech Republic) Dominika Šalková	7–6^{(7–2)}, 6–2
2025	Oksana Selekhmeteva	(Italy) Lucrezia Stefanini	6–1, 6–1

=== Men's singles ===
Year	Champion	Runner-up	Score
2024	(Italy) Luca Nardi	(Italy) Francesco Maestrelli	6–1, 6–3
2023	(Switzerland) Dominic Stricker	(Italy) Giulio Zeppieri	7–6^{(10–8)}, 6–2

=== Women's doubles ===
Year	Champions	Runners-up	Score
2026	(Netherlands) Isabelle Haverlag (Poland) Martyna Kubka	(Czech Republic) Dominika Šalková (Czech Republic) Anna Sisková	6–1, 6–2
2025	(Czech Republic) Jesika Malečková (Czech Republic) Miriam Škoch	(Italy) Silvia Ambrosio (Italy) Aurora Zantedeschi	6–0, 4–6, [10–4]

=== Men's doubles ===
Year	Champions	Runners-up	Score
2024	(India) Sriram Balaji (India) Rithvik Choudary Bollipalli	(France) Théo Arribagé (Portugal) Francisco Cabral	6–3, 2–6, [12–10]
2023	(Romania) Victor Vlad Cornea (Croatia) Franko Škugor	(Ukraine) Vladyslav Manafov (Ukraine) Oleg Prihodko	6–7^{(3–7)}, 6–2, [10–4]
