= 2023 Koper Open – Doubles =

Doubles
- 2023 Koper Open

Final
- Champions: (Romania) Irina Bara (Romania) Andreea Mitu
- Runners-up: (Netherlands) Suzan Lamens (Australia) Kaylah McPhee
- Score: 6–2, 6–3

Events
Singles	Doubles
← 2022 ·	Koper Open	· 2024 →

Xenia Knoll and Samantha Murray Sharan were the defending champions but chose not to participate.

Irina Bara and Andreea Mitu won the title, defeating Suzan Lamens and Kaylah McPhee in the final, 6–2, 6–3.

== Seeds ==
1. (Spain) Aliona Bolsova / (Poland) Weronika Falkowska (semifinals)
2. (Indonesia) Beatrice Gumulya / (Thailand) Peangtarn Plipuech (first round)
3. Amina Anshba / Polina Kudermetova (quarterfinals)
4. (Slovenia) Veronika Erjavec / (North Macedonia) Lina Gjorcheska (first round)

== Draw ==
=== Key ===
- Q = Qualifier
- WC = Wild card
- LL = Lucky loser
- Alt = Alternate
- SE = Special exempt
- PR = Protected ranking
- ITF = ITF entry
- JE = Junior exempt
- w/o = Walkover
- r = Retired
- d = Defaulted
- SR = Special ranking

First round
1	(Spain) A Bolsova (Poland) W Falkowska	6	6
(Germany) T Morderger (Germany) Y Morderger	2	2
(Italy) N Brancaccio (Hungary) A Nagy	6	6
(Slovenia) N Kovačič (Slovenia) P Petelinšek	1	0
4	(Slovenia) V Erjavec (North Macedonia) L Gjorcheska	1	4
(Netherlands) S Lamens (Australia) K McPhee	6	6
(Turkey) B Cengiz (Turkey) İ Öz	6	6
WC	(Slovenia) N Jurič (Slovenia) A Žnuderl	1	3
WC	(Slovenia) P Lovrič (Germany) A Wirges	3	1
(Romania) I Bara (Romania) A Mitu	6	6
(Australia) J Fourlis (Croatia) A Ružić	3	7	[6]
3	A Anshba; P Kudermetova	6	5	[10]
WC	(Slovenia) J Bogatin (Slovenia) P Doberlet	2	6	[7]
(Czech Republic) D Hindová (Czech Republic) A Kučmová	6	4	[10]
(Croatia) J Fett (Croatia) T Lukas	6	6
2	(Indonesia) B Gumulya (Thailand) P Plipuech	3	3

Quarterfinals
1	(Spain) A Bolsova (Poland) W Falkowska	6	6
(Italy) N Brancaccio (Hungary) A Nagy	2	0
(Netherlands) S Lamens (Australia) K McPhee	6	6
(Turkey) B Cengiz (Turkey) İ Öz	3	4
(Romania) I Bara (Romania) A Mitu	4	7^{7}	[10]
3	A Anshba; P Kudermetova	6	6^{5}	[5]
(Czech Republic) D Hindová (Czech Republic) A Kučmová
(Croatia) J Fett (Croatia) T Lukas	w/o

Semifinals
1	(Spain) A Bolsova (Poland) W Falkowska	1	6	[5]
(Netherlands) S Lamens (Australia) K McPhee	6	2	[10]
(Romania) I Bara (Romania) A Mitu	6	6
(Czech Republic) D Hindová (Czech Republic) A Kučmová	4	2

Final
(Netherlands) S Lamens (Australia) K McPhee	2	3
(Romania) I Bara (Romania) A Mitu	6	6
