= 2024 Koper Open =

Tennis tournament

- Date: 15–21 April 2024
- Edition: 3rd
- Category: ITF Women's World Tennis Tour
- Prize money: $60,000
- Surface: Clay / Outdoor
- Location: Koper, Slovenia

Champions

Singles
- (Slovenia) Veronika Erjavec

Doubles
- (Slovenia) Veronika Erjavec / (Czech Republic) Dominika Šalková
← 2023 ·	Koper Open	· 2025 →

The 2024 Koper Open was a professional tennis tournament played on outdoor clay courts. It was the third edition of the tournament, which was part of the 2024 ITF Women's World Tennis Tour. It took place in Koper, Slovenia, between 15 and 21 April 2024.

== Champions ==
=== Singles ===
- (Slovenia) Veronika Erjavec def. (Slovenia) Polona Hercog, 6–4, 6–3

=== Doubles ===
- (Slovenia) Veronika Erjavec / (Czech Republic) Dominika Šalková def. (Greece) Sapfo Sakellaridi / (Italy) Aurora Zantedeschi, 6–1, 6–3

== Singles main draw entrants ==
=== Seeds ===
Country	Player	Rank	Seed
HUN	Panna Udvardy	153	1
FRA	Chloé Paquet	157	2
CZE	Dominika Šalková	173	3
ROU	Miriam Bulgaru	184	4
GER	Anna-Lena Friedsam	189	5
ROU	Anca Todoni	191	6
SLO	Polona Hercog	201	7
SLO	Veronika Erjavec	203	8

- Rankings are as of 8 April 2024.

=== Other entrants ===
The following players received wildcards into the singles main draw:

- (Slovenia) Ana Lanišek
- (Slovenia) Pia Lovrič
- (Slovenia) Ela Nala Milić
- (Slovenia) Nina Potočnik

The following player received entry into the singles main draw using a special ranking:

- (Slovenia) Polona Hercog

The following player received entry into the singles main draw as a special exempt:

- (Ukraine) Anastasiya Soboleva

The following players received entry from the qualifying draw:

- (Brazil) Gabriela Cé
- (Italy) Deborah Chiesa
- (Czech Republic) Aneta Kučmová
- (Germany) Yana Morderger
- (Italy) Tatiana Pieri
- (Greece) Sapfo Sakellaridi
- (Czech Republic) Ivana Šebestová
- (Italy) Aurora Zantedeschi
