= 2022 Koper Open =

Tennis tournament

- Date: 2–8 May 2022
- Edition: 1st
- Category: ITF Women's World Tennis Tour
- Prize money: $60,000
- Surface: Clay / Outdoor
- Location: Koper, Slovenia

Champions

Singles
- (Liechtenstein) Kathinka von Deichmann

Doubles
- (Switzerland) Xenia Knoll / (United Kingdom) Samantha Murray Sharan
Koper Open	· 2023 →

The 2022 Koper Open was a professional tennis tournament played on outdoor clay courts. It was the first edition of the tournament which was part of the 2022 ITF Women's World Tennis Tour. It took place in Koper, Slovenia between 2 and 8 May 2022.

== Singles main draw entrants ==
=== Seeds ===
Country	Player	Rank^{1}	Seed
FRA	Chloé Paquet	101	1
AUT	Julia Grabher	155	2
SRB	Olga Danilović	159	3
BIH	Dea Herdželaš	192	4
BEL	Ysaline Bonaventure	198	5
ESP	Andrea Lázaro García	212	6
SUI	Joanne Züger	221	7
	Natalia Vikhlyantseva	229	8

- ^{1} Rankings are as of 25 April 2022.

=== Other entrants ===
The following players received wildcards into the singles main draw:

- Kristina Dmitruk
- (Slovenia) Živa Falkner
- (Slovenia) Pia Lovrič

The following players received entry from the qualifying draw:

- (United States) Jessie Aney
- (Brazil) Ingrid Gamarra Martins
- (Burundi) Sada Nahimana
- (Germany) Lena Papadakis
- (Slovenia) Lara Smejkal
- Maria Timofeeva
- (Italy) Anna Turati
- (Italy) Bianca Turati

The following player received entry as a lucky loser:

- (Slovakia) Timea Jarušková

== Champions ==
=== Singles ===
- (Liechtenstein) Kathinka von Deichmann def. (Spain) Andrea Lázaro García, 3–6, 6–3, 6–2

=== Doubles ===
- (Switzerland) Xenia Knoll / (United Kingdom) Samantha Murray Sharan def. (Switzerland) Conny Perrin / (Switzerland) Joanne Züger, 6–3, 6–2
