= 2023 Koper Open – Singles =

Singles
- 2023 Koper Open

Final
- Champion: (Spain) Aliona Bolsova
- Runner-up: (Romania) Irina Bara
- Score: 3–6, 6–2, 4–1 retired

Events
Singles	Doubles
← 2022 ·	Koper Open	· 2024 →

Kathinka von Deichmann was the defending champion but chose not to participate.

Aliona Bolsova won the title after Irina Bara retired in the final at 3–6, 6–2, 4–1.

== Seeds ==
All seeds receive a bye into the second round.

1. (Italy) Jasmine Paolini (third round)
2. (France) Léolia Jeanjean (second round)
3. (Hungary) Réka Luca Jani (quarterfinals)
4. (Serbia) Olga Danilović (third round)
5. Polina Kudermetova (second round)
6. (Croatia) Tara Würth (second round)
7. (Spain) Aliona Bolsova (champion)
8. (Italy) Nuria Brancaccio (third round)
9. (Australia) Jaimee Fourlis (second round)
10. (Romania) Jaqueline Cristian (semifinals)
11. (Spain) Jéssica Bouzas Maneiro (quarterfinals)
12. (Croatia) Antonia Ružić (third round)
13. (North Macedonia) Lina Gjorcheska (second round)
14. (Romania) Alexandra Cadanțu-Ignatik (second round)
15. Kristina Dmitruk (quarterfinals)
16. (Croatia) Tena Lukas (third round)

== Draw ==
=== Key ===
- Q = Qualifier
- WC = Wild card
- LL = Lucky loser
- Alt = Alternate
- SE = Special exempt
- PR = Protected ranking
- ITF = ITF entry
- JE = Junior exempt
- w/o = Walkover
- r = Retired
- d = Defaulted
- SR = Special ranking

=== Finals ===
Quarterfinals
15	Kristina Dmitruk	2	4
10	(Romania) Jaqueline Cristian	6	6
3	(Hungary) Réka Luca Jani	0	2
7	(Spain) Aliona Bolsova	6	6
(Romania) Irina Bara	6	6
LL	(Germany) Silvia Ambrosio	2	0
11	(Spain) Jéssica Bouzas Maneiro	4	1
Q	(Romania) Andreea Mitu	6	6

Semifinals
10	(Romania) Jaqueline Cristian	2	1
7	(Spain) Aliona Bolsova	6	6
(Romania) Irina Bara	3	7	6
Q	(Romania) Andreea Mitu	6	5	4

Final
7	(Spain) Aliona Bolsova	3	6	4
(Romania) Irina Bara	6	2	1^{r}

=== Top half ===
==== Section 1 ====
First round
WC	(Slovenia) N Jurič	4	1
Q	(Czech Republic) D Hindová	6	6
Q	(Czech Republic) I Šebestová	1	0
(Poland) W Falkowska	6	6
(Croatia) L Bošković	6	6
Q	(Slovakia) E Méri	3	4
J Kolodynska	4	7^{8}	4
(Slovenia) V Erjavec	6	6^{6}	6

Second round
1	(Italy) J Paolini	6	6
Q	(Czech Republic) D Hindová	1	0
(Poland) W Falkowska	7	1	5
15	K Dmitruk	5	6	7
10	(Romania) J Cristian	6^{3}	4
(Croatia) L Bošković	7^{7}	0^{r}
(Slovenia) V Erjavec	7^{7}	6
6	(Croatia) T Würth	6^{2}	2

Third round
1	(Italy) J Paolini	0	2
15	K Dmitruk	6	6
10	(Romania) J Cristian	7^{7}	6
(Slovenia) V Erjavec	6^{4}	4

Quarterfinals
15	K Dmitruk	2	4
10	(Romania) J Cristian	6	6

==== Section 2 ====
First round
Q	(Germany) Y Morderger	4	4
(Turkey) B Cengiz	6	6
Q	(Hungary) A Nagy	1	2
WC	A Anshba	6	6
(Turkey) İ Öz	6	3	6
WC	(Slovenia) P Lovrič	3	6	3
(Hungary) N Szabanin	5	6	2^{r}
(Finland) A Kulikova	7	3	4

Second round
3	(Hungary) RL Jani	6	6
(Turkey) B Cengiz	3	3
WC	A Anshba	4	3
16	(Croatia) T Lukas	6	6
12	(Croatia) A Ružić	6	6
(Turkey) İ Öz	2	2
(Finland) A Kulikova	4	6	1
7	(Spain) A Bolsova	6	4	6

Third round
3	(Hungary) RL Jani	2	6	6
16	(Croatia) T Lukas	6	1	4
12	(Croatia) A Ružić	6	1	0
7	(Spain) A Bolsova	3	6	6

Quarterfinals
3	(Hungary) RL Jani	0	2
7	(Spain) A Bolsova	6	6

=== Bottom half ===
==== Section 3 ====
First round
(Serbia) L Radivojević	4	7	2
(Romania) I Bara	6	5	6
(Croatia) J Fett	6	1
(Slovenia) N Potočnik	4	0^{r}
(Czech Republic) A Kučmová	3	7	4
LL	(Germany) S Ambrosio	6	5	6
Q	(Italy) C Ferrando	7	0	2
WC	(Slovenia) EN Milić	5	6	6

Second round
5	P Kudermetova	4	4
(Romania) I Bara	6	6
(Croatia) J Fett	6	6
9	(Australia) J Fourlis	3	3
14	(Romania) A Cadanțu-Ignatik	1	3
LL	(Germany) S Ambrosio	6	6
WC	(Slovenia) EN Milić	2	3
4/SR	(Serbia) O Danilović	6	6

Third round
(Romania) I Bara	7^{9}	5	7^{7}
(Croatia) J Fett	6^{7}	7	6^{5}
LL	(Germany) S Ambrosio	6	6
4/SR	(Serbia) O Danilović	2	1

Quarterfinals
(Romania) I Bara	6	6
LL	(Germany) S Ambrosio	2	0

==== Section 4 ====
First round
(Italy) D Cherubini	4	4
(Netherlands) S Lamens	6	6
(Italy) A Turati	1	3
Q	(Ukraine) A Soboleva	6	6
Q	(Romania) A Mitu	6	7
(Thailand) P Plipuech	3	5
SR	(Australia) K McPhee	5	6	3
WC	(Slovenia) Ž Falkner	7	4	6

Second round
8	(Italy) N Brancaccio	6	6
(Netherlands) S Lamens	4	1
Q	(Ukraine) A Soboleva	3	5
11	(Spain) J Bouzas Maneiro	6	7
13	(North Macedonia) L Gjorcheska	1	7	4
Q	(Romania) A Mitu	6	5	6
WC	(Slovenia) Ž Falkner	7	6
2	(France) L Jeanjean	5	3

Third round
8	(Italy) N Brancaccio	6^{2}	3
11	(Spain) J Bouzas Maneiro	7^{7}	6
Q	(Romania) A Mitu	6	6
WC	(Slovenia) Ž Falkner	1	1

Quarterfinals
11	(Spain) J Bouzas Maneiro	4	1
Q	(Romania) A Mitu	6	6
