= 2022 Koper Open – Doubles =

Doubles
- 2022 Koper Open

Final
- Champions: (Switzerland) Xenia Knoll (United Kingdom) Samantha Murray Sharan
- Runners-up: (Switzerland) Conny Perrin (Switzerland) Joanne Züger
- Score: 6–3, 6–2

Events
Singles	Doubles
Koper Open	· 2023 →

This was the first edition of the tournament.

Xenia Knoll and Samantha Murray Sharan won the title, defeating Conny Perrin and Joanne Züger in the final, 6–3, 6–2.

== Seeds ==
1. (Switzerland) Xenia Knoll / (United Kingdom) Samantha Murray Sharan (champions)
2. (Switzerland) Conny Perrin / (Switzerland) Joanne Züger (final)
3. (Hungary) Adrienn Nagy / (India) Prarthana Thombare (first round)
4. (Brazil) Ingrid Gamarra Martins / Iryna Shymanovich (quarterfinals)

== Draw ==
=== Key ===
- Q = Qualifier
- WC = Wild card
- LL = Lucky loser
- Alt = Alternate
- SE = Special exempt
- PR = Protected ranking
- ITF = ITF entry
- JE = Junior exempt
- w/o = Walkover
- r = Retired
- d = Defaulted
- SR = Special ranking

=== Draw ===
First round
K Dmitruk; M Timofeeva	4	3
(Bosnia and Herzegovina) D Herdželaš (Slovenia) N Potočnik	6	6
4	(Brazil) I Gamarra Martins; I Shymanovich	w/o
(Serbia) M Mašić (Slovenia) M Potrč
(United Kingdom) J Burrage (United Kingdom) Y Miyazaki	6	6
(Slovenia) Ž Falkner (Germany) J Jebawy	4	0
WC	(Slovenia) P Drame (Slovenia) B Šulin	0	3
(Serbia) O Danilović (United Kingdom) E Webley-Smith	6	6
(Romania) C Dinu (Spain) A Lázaro García	6	1	[11]
3	(Hungary) A Nagy (India) P Thombare	1	6	[9]
(Italy) A Turati (Italy) B Turati	w/o
(Slovenia) P Lovrič (Slovenia) L Smejkal

Quarterfinals
1	(Switzerland) X Knoll (United Kingdom) S Murray Sharan	w/o
(Bosnia and Herzegovina) D Herdželaš (Slovenia) N Potočnik
4	(Brazil) I Gamarra Martins; I Shymanovich	3	7	[11]
(United Kingdom) J Burrage (United Kingdom) Y Miyazaki	6	5	[13]
(Serbia) O Danilović (United Kingdom) E Webley-Smith	7	6
(Romania) C Dinu (Spain) A Lázaro García	5	3
(Italy) A Turati (Italy) B Turati	6	3	[5]
2	(Switzerland) C Perrin (Switzerland) J Züger	4	6	[10]

Semifinals
1	(Switzerland) X Knoll (United Kingdom) S Murray Sharan	6	6
(United Kingdom) J Burrage (United Kingdom) Y Miyazaki	2	2
(Serbia) O Danilović (United Kingdom) E Webley-Smith
2	(Switzerland) C Perrin (Switzerland) J Züger	w/o

Final
1	(Switzerland) X Knoll (United Kingdom) S Murray Sharan	6	6
2	(Switzerland) C Perrin (Switzerland) J Züger	3	2
