= 2023 Koper Open =

Tennis tournament

- Date: 17–23 April 2023
- Edition: 2nd
- Category: ITF Women's World Tennis Tour
- Prize money: $60,000
- Surface: Clay / Outdoor
- Location: Koper, Slovenia

Champions

Singles
- (Spain) Aliona Bolsova

Doubles
- (Romania) Irina Bara / (Romania) Andreea Mitu
← 2022 ·	Koper Open	· 2024 →

The 2023 Koper Open was a professional tennis tournament played on outdoor clay courts. It was the second edition of the tournament, which was part of the 2023 ITF Women's World Tennis Tour. It took place in Koper, Slovenia, between 17 and 23 April 2023.

== Champions ==
=== Singles ===
- (Spain) Aliona Bolsova def. (Romania) Irina Bara, 3–6, 6–2, 4–1, ret.

=== Doubles ===
- (Romania) Irina Bara / (Romania) Andreea Mitu def. (Netherlands) Suzan Lamens / (Australia) Kaylah McPhee, 6–2, 6–3

== Singles main draw entrants ==
=== Seeds ===
Country	Player	Rank	Seed
ITA	Jasmine Paolini	66	1
FRA	Léolia Jeanjean	116	2
HUN	Réka Luca Jani	129	3
SRB	Olga Danilović	135	4
	Polina Kudermetova	141	5
CRO	Tara Würth	146	6
ESP	Aliona Bolsova	148	7
ITA	Nuria Brancaccio	170	8
AUS	Jaimee Fourlis	177	9
ROU	Jaqueline Cristian	180	10
ESP	Jéssica Bouzas Maneiro	185	11
CRO	Antonia Ružić	207	12
MKD	Lina Gjorcheska	213	13
ROU	Alexandra Cadanțu-Ignatik	217	14
	Kristina Dmitruk	227	15
CRO	Tena Lukas	232	16

- Rankings are as of 10 April 2023.

=== Other entrants ===
The following players received wildcards into the singles main draw:

- Amina Anshba
- (Slovenia) Živa Falkner
- (Slovenia) Noka Jurič
- (Slovenia) Pia Lovrič
- (Slovenia) Ela Nala Milić

The following players received entry into the singles main draw using a special ranking:

- (Serbia) Olga Danilović
- (Australia) Kaylah McPhee

The following players received entry from the qualifying draw:

- (Italy) Cristiana Ferrando
- (Czech Republic) Denisa Hindová
- (Slovakia) Eszter Méri
- (Romania) Andreea Mitu
- (Germany) Yana Morderger
- (Hungary) Adrienn Nagy
- (Czech Republic) Ivana Šebestová
- (Ukraine) Anastasiya Soboleva

The following player received entry as a lucky loser:

- (Germany) Silvia Ambrosio
