= 2024 Koper Open – Singles =

Singles
- 2024 Koper Open

Final
- Champion: (Slovenia) Veronika Erjavec
- Runner-up: (Slovenia) Polona Hercog
- Score: 6–4, 6–3

Events
Singles	Doubles
← 2023 ·	Koper Open	· 2025 →

Aliona Bolsova was the defending champion but chose not to participate.

Veronika Erjavec won the title, defeating Polona Hercog in an all-Slovenian final, 6–4, 6–3.

== Seeds ==
1. (Hungary) Panna Udvardy (second round)
2. (France) Chloé Paquet (semifinals)
3. (Czech Republic) Dominika Šalková (first round)
4. (Romania) Miriam Bulgaru (second round)
5. (Germany) Anna-Lena Friedsam (first round, retired)
6. (Romania) Anca Todoni (first round)
7. (Slovenia) Polona Hercog (final)
8. (Slovenia) Veronika Erjavec (champion)

== Draw ==
=== Key ===
- Q = Qualifier
- WC = Wild card
- LL = Lucky loser
- Alt = Alternate
- SE = Special exempt
- PR = Protected ranking
- ITF = ITF entry
- JE = Junior exempt
- w/o = Walkover
- r = Retired
- d = Defaulted
- SR = Special ranking

=== Finals ===
Semifinals
(Australia) Jaimee Fourlis	2	3
8	(Slovenia) Veronika Erjavec	6	6
7/SR	(Slovenia) Polona Hercog	2	6	6
2	(France) Chloé Paquet	6	1	4

Final
8	(Slovenia) Veronika Erjavec	6	6
7/SR	(Slovenia) Polona Hercog	4	3

=== Top half ===
First round
1	(Hungary) P Udvardy	6	6
WC	(Slovenia) EN Milić	4	2
(Australia) J Fourlis	5	6	7^{7}
Q	(Germany) Y Morderger	7	1	6^{3}
(Spain) G Maristany	4	2
Q	(Italy) D Chiesa	6	6
(North Macedonia) L Gjorcheska	6	6
6	(Romania) A Todoni	4	1
4	(Romania) M Bulgaru	5	6	6
(Romania) C Dinu	7	4	4
Q	(Brazil) G Cé	3	1
(Croatia) A Ružić	6	6
I Shymanovich	6	6
Q	(Greece) S Sakellaridi	3	1
(Croatia) L Bošković	4	1
8	(Slovenia) V Erjavec	6	6

Second round
1	(Hungary) P Udvardy	0	1
(Australia) J Fourlis	6	6
Q	(Italy) D Chiesa	6	6
(North Macedonia) L Gjorcheska	4	4
4	(Romania) M Bulgaru	3	5
(Croatia) A Ružić	6	7
I Shymanovich	2	3
8	(Slovenia) V Erjavec	6	6

Quarterfinals
(Australia) J Fourlis	3	7	6
Q	(Italy) D Chiesa	6	5	2
(Croatia) A Ružić	4	1
8	(Slovenia) V Erjavec	6	6

Semifinals
(Australia) J Fourlis	2	3
8	(Slovenia) V Erjavec	6	6

=== Bottom half ===
First round
7/SR	(Slovenia) P Hercog	6	6
Q	(Czech Republic) A Kučmová	4	0
WC	(Slovenia) N Potočnik	6	6
Q	(Czech Republic) I Šebestová	1	1
(Serbia) D Radanović	6	7
Q	(Italy) T Pieri	1	5
WC	(Slovenia) P Lovrič	6	6
3	(Czech Republic) D Šalková	3	2
5	(Germany) A-L Friedsam	0	1^{r}
SE	(Ukraine) A Soboleva	6	2
(Bulgaria) G Topalova	5	6	1^{r}
(Lithuania) J Mikulskytė	7	2	4
(Romania) A Mitu	6	6
WC	(Slovenia) A Lanišek	1	0
Q	(Italy) A Zantedeschi	7^{7}	2	0
2	(France) C Paquet	6^{4}	6	6

Second round
7/SR	(Slovenia) P Hercog	6	6
WC	(Slovenia) N Potočnik	4	0
(Serbia) D Radanović	6^{5}	5
WC	(Slovenia) P Lovrič	7^{7}	7
SE	(Ukraine) A Soboleva	6	3	3
(Lithuania) J Mikulskytė	2	6	6
(Romania) A Mitu	3	1
2	(France) C Paquet	6	6

Quarterfinals
7/SR	(Slovenia) P Hercog	6	6
WC	(Slovenia) P Lovrič	3	4
(Lithuania) J Mikulskytė	6	1	4
2	(France) C Paquet	3	6	6

Semifinals
7/SR	(Slovenia) P Hercog	2	6	6
2	(France) C Paquet	6	1	4
