= 2022 Koper Open – Singles =

Singles
- 2022 Koper Open

Final
- Champion: (Liechtenstein) Kathinka von Deichmann
- Runner-up: (Spain) Andrea Lázaro García
- Score: 3–6, 6–3, 6–2

Events
Singles	Doubles
Koper Open	· 2023 →

This was the first edition of the tournament.

Kathinka von Deichmann won the title, defeating Andrea Lázaro García in the final, 3–6, 6–3, 6–2.

== Seeds ==
1. (France) Chloé Paquet (quarterfinals)
2. (Austria) Julia Grabher (semifinals)
3. (Serbia) Olga Danilović (quarterfinals, retired)
4. (Bosnia and Herzegovina) Dea Herdželaš (first round)
5. (Belgium) Ysaline Bonaventure (semifinals)
6. (Spain) Andrea Lázaro García (final)
7. (Switzerland) Joanne Züger (quarterfinals)
8. Natalia Vikhlyantseva (second round)

== Draw ==
=== Key ===
- Q = Qualifier
- WC = Wild card
- LL = Lucky loser
- Alt = Alternate
- SE = Special exempt
- PR = Protected ranking
- ITF = ITF entry
- JE = Junior exempt
- w/o = Walkover
- r = Retired
- d = Defaulted
- SR = Special ranking

=== Finals ===
Semifinals
6	(Spain) Andrea Lázaro García	6	6
5	(Belgium) Ysaline Bonaventure	4	1
(Liechtenstein) Kathinka von Deichmann	7^{7}	2	7^{7}
2	(Austria) Julia Grabher	6^{4}	6	6^{2}

Final
6	(Spain) Andrea Lázaro García	6	3	2
(Liechtenstein) Kathinka von Deichmann	3	6	6

=== Top half ===
First round
1	(France) C Paquet	7^{7}	6
(Spain) I Burillo Escorihuela	6^{4}	1
(North Macedonia) L Gjorcheska	6	6
LL	(Slovakia) T Jarušková	2	2
(Italy) C Ferrando	6	7
Q	(Brazil) I Gamarra Martins	3	5
Q	(Italy) B Turati	4	0
6	(Spain) A Lázaro García	6	6
3	(Serbia) O Danilović	6	6
Q	(United States) J Aney	4	2
I Shymanovich	6	6
Q	(Germany) L Papadakis	2	3
WC	K Dmitruk	6	3	2
(Italy) M Di Giuseppe	2	6	6
Q	(Slovenia) L Smejkal	1	3
5	(Belgium) Y Bonaventure	6	6

Second round
1	(France) C Paquet	6	6
(North Macedonia) L Gjorcheska	3	3
(Italy) C Ferrando	6^{6}	6	4
6	(Spain) A Lázaro García	7^{8}	3	6
3	(Serbia) O Danilović	6	6
I Shymanovich	2	3
(Italy) M Di Giuseppe	1	3
5	(Belgium) Y Bonaventure	6	6

Quarterfinals
1	(France) C Paquet	3	2
6	(Spain) A Lázaro García	6	6
3	(Serbia) O Danilović	3^{r}
5	(Belgium) Y Bonaventure	4

Semifinals
6	(Spain) A Lázaro García	6	6
5	(Belgium) Y Bonaventure	4	1

=== Bottom half ===
First round
7	(Switzerland) J Züger	6	6
Q	(Italy) A Turati	3	3
(Romania) C Dinu	3	4
(Switzerland) L Sun	6	6
(Liechtenstein) K von Deichmann	2
WC	(Slovenia) P Lovrič	0^{r}
(United Kingdom) J Burrage	6	6
4	(Bosnia and Herzegovina) D Herdželaš	2	4
8	N Vikhlyantseva	3	6	7^{7}
WC	(Slovenia) Ž Falkner	6	1	6^{3}
Q	(Burundi) S Nahimana	6	6
Q	M Timofeeva	3	2
D Astakhova	6	0
(Switzerland) C Perrin	0	0^{r}
(United Kingdom) Y Miyazaki	5	2
2	(Austria) J Grabher	7	6

Second round
7	(Switzerland) J Züger	6	7^{7}
(Switzerland) L Sun	3	6^{2}
(Liechtenstein) K von Deichmann	6^{10}	6	6
(United Kingdom) J Burrage	7^{12}	3	2
8	N Vikhlyantseva	6	2	3
Q	(Burundi) S Nahimana	4	6	6
D Astakhova	2	0
2	(Austria) J Grabher	6	6

Quarterfinals
7	(Switzerland) J Züger	6	4	0
(Liechtenstein) K von Deichmann	3	6	6
Q	(Burundi) S Nahimana	4	1
2	(Austria) J Grabher	6	6

Semifinals
(Liechtenstein) K von Deichmann	7^{7}	2	7^{7}
2	(Austria) J Grabher	6^{4}	6	6^{2}
