= 2024 Koper Open – Doubles =

Doubles
- 2024 Koper Open

Final
- Champions: (Slovenia) Veronika Erjavec (Czech Republic) Dominika Šalková
- Runners-up: (Greece) Sapfo Sakellaridi (Italy) Aurora Zantedeschi
- Score: 6–1, 6–3

Events
Singles	Doubles
- Koper Open

Irina Bara and Andreea Mitu were the defending champions but Bara chose not to participate. Mitu partnered alongside Lina Gjorcheska, but lost to Veronika Erjavec and Dominika Šalková in the semifinals.

Erjavec and Šalková went on to win the title, defeating Sapfo Sakellaridi and Aurora Zantedeschi in the final, 6–1, 6–3.

== Seeds ==
1. (Slovenia) Veronika Erjavec / (Czech Republic) Dominika Šalková (champions)
2. (Croatia) Mariana Dražić / Ekaterina Yashina (first round)
3. (Greece) Sapfo Sakellaridi / (Italy) Aurora Zantedeschi (final)
4. (Czech Republic) Aneta Kučmová / (United Kingdom) Emily Webley-Smith (first round)

== Draw ==
Key

- Q = Qualifier
- WC = Wild card
- LL = Lucky loser
- Alt = Alternate
- ITF = ITF entry
- PR = Protected ranking
- SR = Special ranking
- SE = Special exempt
- JE = Junior exempt
- JR = Junior Accelerator Programme entrant
- CO = College Accelerator Programme entrant
- NG = Next Gen Accelerator Program entrant
- w/o = Walkover
- r = Retired
- d = Defaulted

First round
1	(Slovenia) V Erjavec (Czech Republic) D Šalková	6	6
(Germany) T Morderger (Germany) Y Morderger	2	4
WC	(Slovenia) N Kovačič (Slovenia) K Najzer	6	6
(Slovenia) N Jurič (Slovenia) A Lanišek	4	3
4	(Czech Republic) A Kučmová (United Kingdom) E Webley-Smith	6	2	[10]
(Czech Republic) I Šebestová (Ukraine) A Soboleva	4	6	[12]
(North Macedonia) L Gjorcheska (Romania) A Mitu	6	6
(Czech Republic) V Bervid (Czech Republic) D Hrdinková	3	2
(Slovenia) M Marenk (Slovenia) L Smejkal	2	2
(Romania) C Dinu (Australia) J Fourlis	6	6
(Slovenia) Z Bizjak (Slovenia) J Bogatin	0	3
3	(Greece) S Sakellaridi (Italy) A Zantedeschi	6	6
(Slovenia) P Petelinšek (Slovenia) A Žnuderl	0^{r}
WC	(Slovenia) EN Milić (Romania) A Todoni	5
WC	(Slovenia) P Lovrič (Slovenia) N Potočnik	6	1	[10]
2	(Croatia) M Dražić; E Yashina	1	6	[7]

Quarterfinals
1	(Slovenia) V Erjavec (Czech Republic) D Šalková	6	6
WC	(Slovenia) N Kovačič (Slovenia) K Najzer	1	1
(Czech Republic) I Šebestová (Ukraine) A Soboleva	4	1
(North Macedonia) L Gjorcheska (Romania) A Mitu	6	6
(Romania) C Dinu (Australia) J Fourlis	5	6	[6]
3	(Greece) S Sakellaridi (Italy) A Zantedeschi	7	4	[10]
WC	(Slovenia) EN Milić (Romania) A Todoni
WC	(Slovenia) P Lovrič (Slovenia) N Potočnik	w/o

Semifinals
1	(Slovenia) V Erjavec (Czech Republic) D Šalková	6	6^{4}	[10]
(North Macedonia) L Gjorcheska (Romania) A Mitu	2	7^{7}	[7]
3	(Greece) S Sakellaridi (Italy) A Zantedeschi	6	7
WC	(Slovenia) P Lovrič (Slovenia) N Potočnik	4	5

Final
1	(Slovenia) V Erjavec (Czech Republic) D Šalková	6	6
3	(Greece) S Sakellaridi (Italy) A Zantedeschi	1	3
