= Samantha Murray Sharan =

British tennis player (born 1987)

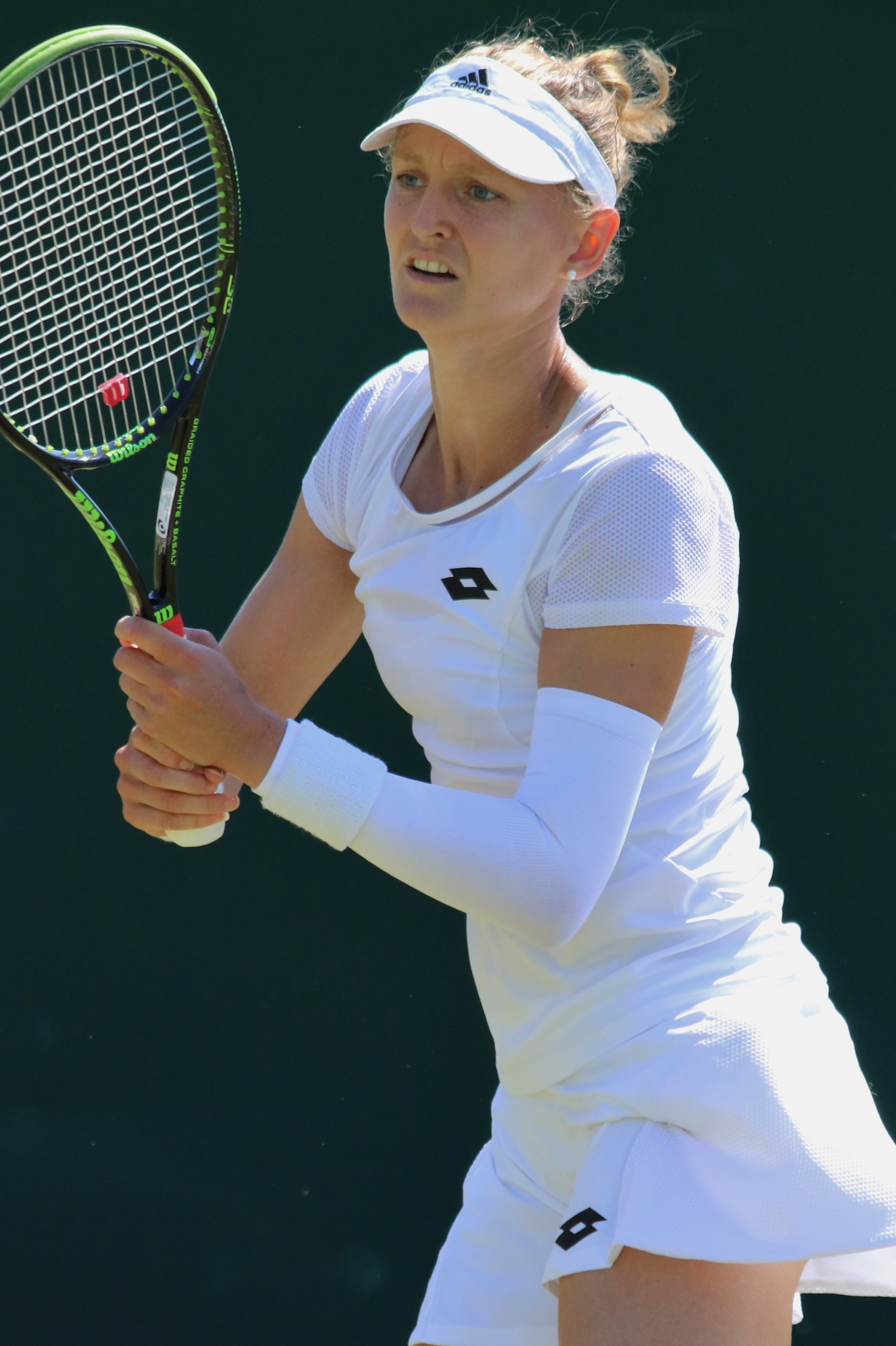
- Murray at the 2018 Wimbledon Championships
- Full name: Samantha Dawn Murray Sharan
- Country (sports): United Kingdom
- Born: 9 October 1987 (age 38) Stockport, United Kingdom
- Height: 1.78 m (5 ft 10 in)
- Prize money: US $624,634

Singles
- Career record: 248–216
- Career titles: 4 ITF
- Highest ranking: No. 165 (23 September 2013)
- Current ranking: No. 825 (27 January 2025)

Grand Slam singles results
- Australian Open: Q1 (2020, 2022)
- French Open: Q1 (2020, 2021)
- Wimbledon: 1R (2013, 2014, 2021)
- US Open: Q2 (2013, 2021)

Doubles
- Career record: 275–190
- Career titles: 28 ITF
- Highest ranking: No. 76 (22 August 2022)
- Current ranking: No. 109 (27 January 2025)

Grand Slam doubles results
- Australian Open: 1R (2024)
- French Open: 2R (2022)
- Wimbledon: 1R (2013, 2021, 2022, 2024, 2026)
- US Open: 1R (2024)

Grand Slam mixed doubles results
- Wimbledon: 2R (2021)
Medal record
Representing Great Britain
Women's Tennis
Summer Universiade
Bronze medal – third place	2009 Belgrade	Mixed doubles
- Last updated on: 27 January 2025.

Samantha Dawn Murray Sharan (née Murray; born 9 October 1987) is a British tennis player who specializes in doubles. On 22 August 2022, she reached her best doubles ranking of world No. 76.

Murray has won four singles titles and 28 doubles titles on the ITF Women's Circuit. On 23 September 2013, she peaked at No. 165 in the singles rankings.

== Career ==
Murray made her WTA Tour debut at the 2011 Eastbourne Classic, losing to Anna Tatishvili in the first round.

Partnering Laura Pigossi, she won the biggest title of her career to date by taking the doubles at the 2024 W100 Wiesbaden Open, defeating Himeno Sakatsume and Anita Wagner in the final.

Sharan continued to anchor her schedule around major international doubles events through 2024 and 2025. In addition to her regular appearances on the ITF women's Circuit, she featured in the women's doubles main draws at the Australian and US open.

== Personal life ==
Murray married Indian tennis doubles specialist Divij Sharan in July 2019.

== Grand Slam performance timelines ==
Key
W	F	SF	QF	#R	RR	Q#	P#	DNQ	A	Z#	PO	G	S	B	NMS	NTI	P	NH

(W) winner; (F) finalist; (SF) semifinalist; (QF) quarterfinalist; (#R) rounds 4, 3, 2, 1; (RR) round-robin stage; (Q#) qualification round; (P#) preliminary round; (DNQ) did not qualify; (A) absent; (Z#) Davis/Fed Cup Zonal Group (with number indication) or (PO) play-off; (G) gold, (S) silver or (B) bronze Olympic/Paralympic medal; (NMS) not a Masters tournament; (NTI) not a Tier I tournament; (P) postponed; (NH) not held; (SR) strike rate (events won / competed); (W–L) win–loss record.
To avoid confusion and double counting, these charts are updated at the conclusion of a tournament or when the player's participation has ended.

== ITF Circuit finals ==
=== Singles: 10 (4 titles, 6 runner–ups) ===
Legend $25,000 tournaments $10/15,000 tournaments	Finals by surface Hard (4–6) Grass

Result	W–L	Date	Tournament	Tier	Surface	Opponent	Score
Loss	0–1	Nov 2010	ITF Sunderland, United Kingdom	10,000	Hard (i)	(United Kingdom) Anna Fitzpatrick	2–6, 6–3, 5–7
Loss	0–2	May 2011	ITF Rethymno, Greece	10,000	Hard	(Russia) Alexandra Artamonova	2–6, 4–6
Win	1–2	Oct 2012	GB Pro-Series Glasgow, UK	25,000	Hard (i)	(Belgium) Alison Van Uytvanck	6–3, 2–6, 6–3
Loss	1–3	Jul 2013	Challenger de Granby, Canada	25,000	Hard	(Japan) Risa Ozaki	6–0, 5–7, 2–6
Loss	1–4	Jul 2013	ITF Winnipeg, Canada	25,000	Hard	(United Kingdom) Johanna Konta	3–6, 1–6
Loss	1–5	May 2016	ITF Sharm El Sheikh, Egypt	10,000	Hard	(Germany) Julia Wachaczyk	3–6, 4–6
Win	2–5	Oct 2017	ITF Wirral, United Kingdom	15,000	Hard (i)	(United Kingdom) Eden Silva	6–2, 6–2
Loss	2–6	Sep 2018	ITF Santarém, Portugal	15,000	Hard	(Belgium) Greet Minnen	5–7, 3–6
Win	3–6	Aug 2019	ITF Chiswick, United Kingdom	25,000	Hard	(Netherlands) Lesley Kerkhove	6–4, 6–4
Win	4–6	Mar 2020	ITF Potchefstroom, South Africa	25,000	Hard	(Russia) Marina Melnikova	2–6, 6–2, 6–4

=== Doubles: 48 (28 titles, 20 runner-ups) ===
Legend $100,000 tournaments $80,000 tournaments $50/60,000 tournaments $40,000 tournaments $25,000 tournaments $10/15,000 tournaments	Finals by surface Hard (24–18) Clay (3–0) Grass (0–2) Carpet (1–0)

Result	W–L	Date	Tournament	Tier	Surface	Partner	Opponents	Score
Win	1–0	Oct 2005	ITF Quartu Sant'Elena, Italy	10,000	Hard	(Netherlands) Kika Hogendoorn	(Czech Republic) Simona Dobrá (Czech Republic) Renata Kučerková	6–4, 4–6, 7–5
Loss	1–1	July 2007	ITF Frinton-on-Sea, United Kingdom	10,000	Grass	(United States) Alexis Prousis	(United Kingdom) Rebecca Llewellyn (United Kingdom) Elizabeth Thomas	6–3, 5–7, 2–6
Win	2–1	May 2011	ITF Edinburgh, United Kingdom	10,000	Clay	(United Kingdom) Jade Windley	(South Africa) Surina de Beer (Germany) Scarlett Werner	7–5, 4–6, [10–8]
Win	3–1	May 2011	ITF Heraklion, Greece	10,000	Hard	(United Kingdom) Anna Fitzpatrick	(United Kingdom) Amanda Elliott (Austria) Nicole Rottmann	6–3, 6–2
Win	4–1	July 2011	ITF Chiswick, United Kingdom	10,000	Hard	(United Kingdom) Jade Windley	(United Kingdom) Lucy Brown (United Kingdom) Francesca Stephenson	6–4, 6–4
Win	5–1	Sep 2011	ITF Alice Springs, Australia	25,000	Hard	(Brazil) Maria Fernanda Alves	(Australia) Brooke Rischbieth (Australia) Storm Sanders	3–6, 7–5, [10–3]
Loss	5–2	Sep 2011	ITF Cairns, Australia	25,000	Hard	(Brazil) Maria Fernanda Alves	(Indonesia) Ayu Fani Damayanti (Indonesia) Jessy Rompies	3–6, 3–6
Win	6–2	Sep 2011	ITF Darwin, Australia	25,000	Hard	(Brazil) Maria Fernanda Alves	(Australia) Stephanie Bengson (Australia) Tyra Calderwood	6–4, 6–2
Loss	6–3	Nov 2011	Bendigo International, Australia	25,000	Hard	(Australia) Storm Sanders	(Australia) Stephanie Bengson (Australia) Tyra Calderwood	6–2, 1–6, [5–10]
Win	7–3	Jan 2012	GB Pro-Series Glasgow, United Kingdom	10,000	Hard (i)	(United Kingdom) Anna Fitzpatrick	(United Kingdom) Alexandra Walker (United Kingdom) Lisa Whybourn	6–2, 6–3
Win	8–3	Mar 2012	GB Pro-Series Bath, United Kingdom	10,000	Hard (i)	(United Kingdom) Emily Webley-Smith	(Slovakia) Lenka Juríková (Poland) Katarzyna Piter	4–6, 6–4, [10–5]
Loss	8–4	May 2012	ITF Karuizawa, Japan	25,000	Grass	(United Kingdom) Emily Webley-Smith	(Chinese Taipei) Hsieh Shu-ying (Japan) Kumiko Iijima	6–3, 6–7^{(6)}, [1–10]
Win	9–4	Aug 2012	ITF Westende, Belgium	10,000	Hard	(Republic of Ireland) Amy Bowtell	(Belgium) Steffi Distelmans (Belgium) Magali Kempen	6–3, 6–3
Loss	9–5	Sep 2012	ITF Clermont-Ferrand, France	25,000	Hard (i)	(United Kingdom) Jade Windley	(Latvia) Diāna Marcinkēviča (Netherlands) Bibiane Schoofs	3–6, 0–6
Win	10–5	Jan 2013	ITF Preston, United Kingdom	10,000	Hard (i)	(United Kingdom) Jade Windley	(United Kingdom) Tara Moore (United Kingdom) Melanie South	6–3, 3–6, [10–5]
Loss	10–6	Feb 2013	Midland Tennis Classic, United States	100,000	Hard (i)	(Brazil) Maria Fernanda Alves	(Hungary) Melinda Czink (Croatia) Mirjana Lučić-Baroni	7–5, 4–6, [7–10]
Loss	10–7	May 2013	Soweto Open, South Africa	50,000	Hard	(United Kingdom) Jade Windley	(Poland) Magda Linette (South Africa) Chanel Simmonds	1–6, 3–6
Loss	10–8	July 2013	ITF Winnipeg, Canada	25,000	Hard	(United Kingdom) Jade Windley	(Canada) Heidi El Tabakh (United States) Allie Kiick	4–6, 6–2, [8–10]
Loss	10–9	Sep 2013	GB Pro-Series Shrewsbury, UK	25,000	Hard (i)	(United Kingdom) Jade Windley	(Turkey) Çağla Büyükakçay (Turkey) Pemra Özgen	6–4, 4–6, [8–10]
Win	11–9	Apr 2016	ITF Sharm El Sheikh, Egypt	10,000	Hard	(Greece) Despina Papamichail	(Egypt) Ola Abou Zekry (Romania) Jaqueline Cristian	6–3, 6–2
Win	12–9	May 2016	ITF Sharm El Sheikh, Egypt	10,000	Hard	(Greece) Despina Papamichail	(India) Nidhi Chilumula (India) Rishika Sunkara	3–6, 6–2, [10–1]
Win	13–9	Jul 2016	ITF Lisbon, Portugal	10,000	Hard	(Finland) Emma Laine	(France) Mathilde Armitano (Portugal) Inês Murta	7–6^{(5)}, 6–3
Loss	13–10	Aug 2016	ITF Gatineau, Canada	25,000	Hard	(Japan) Mana Ayukawa	(Canada) Bianca Andreescu (Canada) Charlotte Robillard-Millette	6–4, 4–6, [6–10]
Loss	13–11	Oct 2017	ITF Cherbourg-en-Cotentin, France	25,000	Hard (i)	(India) Karman Kaur Thandi	(France) Manon Arcangioli (France) Shérazad Reix	1–3 ret.
Win	14–11	Oct 2017	Open de Touraine, France	25,000	Hard (i)	(United Kingdom) Sarah Beth Grey	(Romania) Jaqueline Cristian (Romania) Elena-Gabriela Ruse	7–6^{(3)}, 6–3
Win	15–11	Oct 2017	ITF Wirral, United Kingdom	15,000	Hard (i)	(United Kingdom) Maia Lumsden	(United Kingdom) Alicia Barnett (United Kingdom) Laura Sainsbury	6–4, 6–3
Loss	15–12	Dec 2017	ITF Pune, India	25,000	Hard	(Montenegro) Ana Veselinović	(Indonesia) Jessy Rompies (Thailand) Varunya Wongteanchai	4–6, 2–6
Win	16–12	Aug 2018	ITF Chiswick, United Kingdom	25,000	Hard	(United Kingdom) Freya Christie	(United Kingdom) Sarah Beth Grey (United Kingdom) Olivia Nicholls	3–6, 7–5, [10–8]
Win	17–12	Sep 2018	ITF Santarém, Portugal	15,000	Hard	(United States) Dasha Ivanova	(Italy) Maria Masini (Portugal) Inês Murta	6–0, 1–6, [10–4]
Win	18–12	Sep 2018	ITF Lisbon, Portugal	25,000	Hard	(Finland) Emma Laine	(Netherlands) Michaëlla Krajicek (Czech Republic) Tereza Martincová	7–5, 6–4
Loss	18–13	May 2019	ITF Jerusalem, Israel	25,000	Hard	(Greece) Despina Papamichail	(Belarus) Yuliya Hatouka (Slovakia) Tereza Mihalíková	6–2, 4–6, [8–10]
Loss	18–14	Jun 2019	ITF Santa Margarida de Montbui, Spain	25,000	Hard	(Bulgaria) Elitsa Kostova	(Georgia (country)) Sofia Shapatava (United Kingdom) Emily Webley-Smith	4–6, 5–7
Loss	18–15	Aug 2019	ITF Chiswick, United Kingdom	25,000	Hard	(United Kingdom) Freya Christie	(Greece) Valentini Grammatikopoulou (United Kingdom) Sarah Beth Grey	7–6^{(6)}, 3–6, [5–10]
Loss	18–16	Sep 2019	Jinan International Open, China	60,000	Hard	(United Kingdom) Eden Silva	(China) Yuan Yue (China) Zheng Wushuang	6–1, 4–6, [7–10]
Win	19–16	Sep 2019	ITF Roehampton, United Kingdom	25,000	Hard	(United Kingdom) Anna Smith	(Germany) Sarah-Rebecca Sekulic (Germany) Julia Wachaczyk	6–4, 6–3
Win	20–16	Oct 2019	ITF Cherbourg-en-Cotentin, France	25,000	Hard (i)	(United Kingdom) Naomi Broady	(France) Myrtille Georges (Belgium) Kimberley Zimmermann	6–3, 6–2
Loss	20–17	Oct 2019	Challenger de Saguenay, Canada	60,000	Hard (i)	(Netherlands) Bibiane Schoofs	(Canada) Mélodie Collard (Canada) Leylah Fernandez	6–7^{(3)}, 2–6
Loss	20–18	Feb 2020	Open de l'Isère, France	25,000	Hard (i)	(Germany) Julia Wachaczyk	(France) Amandine Hesse (France) Elixane Lechemia	3–6, 6–4, [11–13]
Win	21–18	Mar 2020	ITF Potchefstroom, South Africa	25,000	Hard	(Hungary) Fanny Stollár	(Turkey) Berfu Cengiz (New Zealand) Paige Hourigan	6–1, 6–1
Win	22–18	Sep 2020	Open de Cagnes-sur-Mer, France	80,000	Clay	(Germany) Julia Wachaczyk	(Poland) Paula Kania (Poland) Katarzyna Piter	7–5, 6–2
Loss	22–19	Aug 2021	Landisville Challenge, United States	100,000	Hard	(Russia) Valeria Savinykh	(United States) Hanna Chang (United States) Alexa Glatch	6–7^{(3)}, 6–3, [9–11]
Win	23–19	Oct 2021	Internationaux de Poitiers, France	80,000	Hard (i)	(Georgia (country)) Mariam Bolkvadze	(France) Audrey Albié (France) Léolia Jeanjean	7–6^{(5)}, 6–0
Win	24–19	Nov 2021	Open Nantes Atlantique, France	60,000	Hard (i)	(France) Jessika Ponchet	(United Kingdom) Alicia Barnett (United Kingdom) Olivia Nicholls	6–4, 6–2
Win	25–19	Feb 2022	AK Ladies Open, Germany	60,000	Carpet (i)	(Georgia (country)) Mariam Bolkvadze	(Switzerland) Susan Bandecchi (Switzerland) Simona Waltert	6–3, 7–5
Win	26–19	May 2022	Koper Open, Slovenia	60,000	Clay	(Switzerland) Xenia Knoll	(Switzerland) Conny Perrin (Switzerland) Joanne Züger	6–3, 6–2
Win	27–19	Oct 2023	ITF Baza, Spain	25,000	Hard	(Australia) Olivia Gadecki	(Croatia) Lea Bošković (Spain) Ángela Fita Boluda	7–5, 4–6, [10–4]
Loss	27–20	Oct 2023	ITF Sunderland, United Kingdom	25,000	Hard (i)	(Georgia (country)) Mariam Bolkvadze	(United Kingdom) Freya Christie (Estonia) Elena Malõgina	0–6, 6–4, [4–10]
Win	28–20	Nov 2023	ITF Pétange, Luxembourg	40,000	Hard (i)	(United Kingdom) Alicia Barnett	(United Kingdom) Ali Collins (Netherlands) Isabelle Haverlag	6–7^{(4)}, 6–1, [10–6]
