= Xenia Knoll =

Swiss tennis player (born 1992)

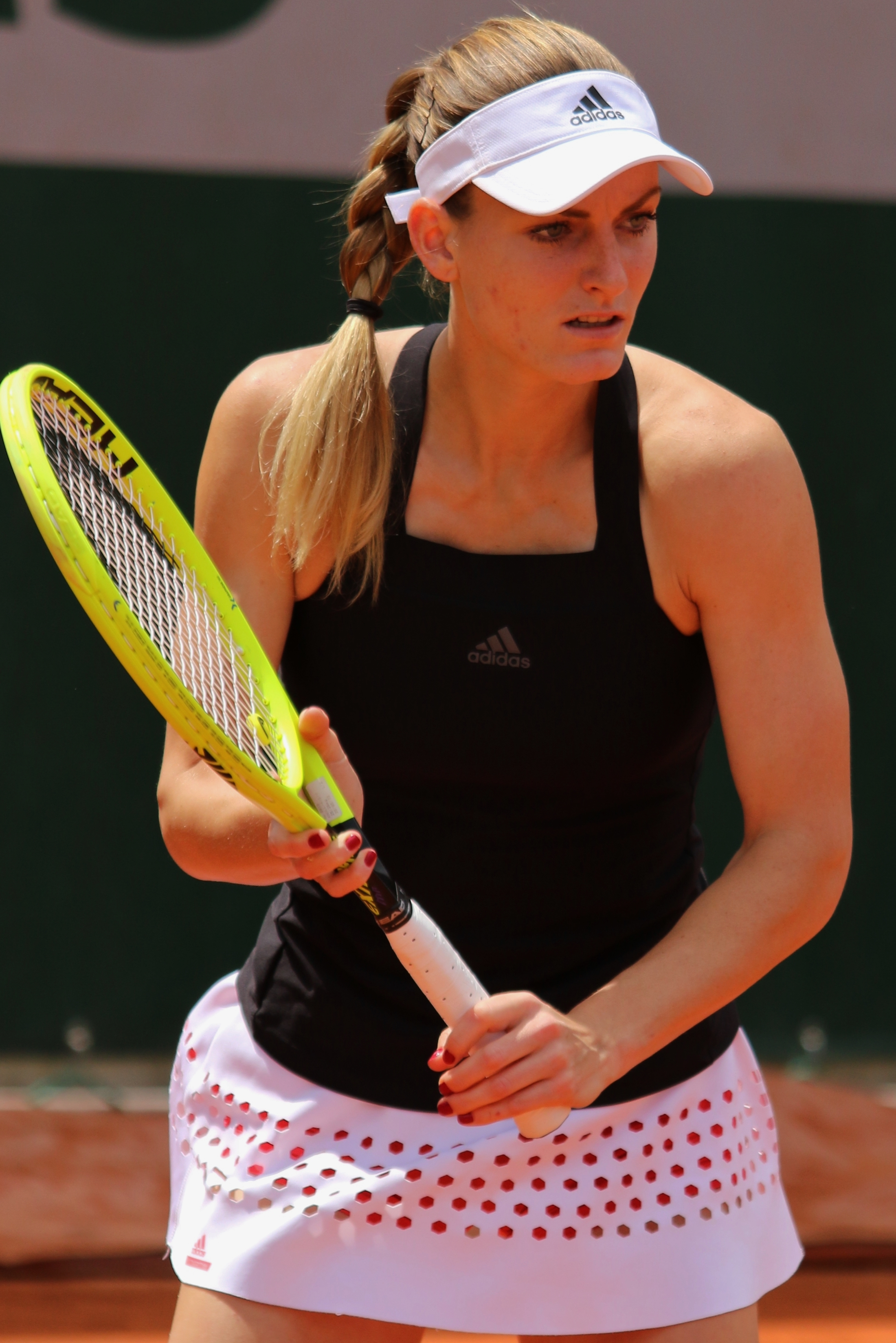
- Knoll at the 2019 French Open
- Country (sports): Switzerland
- Born: 2 September 1992 (age 32); Biel, Switzerland
- Height: 1.75 m (5 ft 9 in)
- Plays: Left (two-handed backhand)
- Prize money: US$ 330,461

Singles
- Career record: 200–150
- Career titles: 4 ITF
- Highest ranking: No. 254 (23 March 2015)

Doubles
- Career record: 307–172
- Career titles: 2 WTA, 1 WTA Challenger
- Highest ranking: No. 40 (17 April 2017)

Grand Slam doubles results
- Australian Open: 1R (2018)
- French Open: 2R (2019)
- Wimbledon: 2R (2016)
- US Open: 1R (2016, 2017, 2018)

Grand Slam mixed doubles results
- Wimbledon: 1R (2017)

Team competitions
- Fed Cup: 0–1

Xenia Knoll (Serbian Cyrillic: Ксенија Кнол, romanized: Ksenija Knol; born 2 September 1992) is a Swiss former tennis player.

Knoll won two doubles titles on the WTA Tour and one WTA 125 doubles title, as well as four singles and 32 doubles titles on the ITF Circuit. On 23 March 2015, she reached her career-high singles ranking of world No. 254. On 17 April 2017, she peaked at No. 40 in the WTA doubles rankings.

Knoll made her WTA Tour debut at the 2013 Budapest Grand Prix with a direct entry into the main draw, losing in straight sets to the former world-ranked No. 11, Shahar Pe'er of Israel.

Knoll made her debut for the Switzerland Fed Cup team in 2015.

== Personal life ==
She is of Serbian descent on her mother's side who is from Belgrade.

== Performance timeline ==
Key
W	F	SF	QF	#R	RR	Q#	P#	DNQ	A	Z#	PO	G	S	B	NMS	NTI	P	NH

(W) winner; (F) finalist; (SF) semifinalist; (QF) quarterfinalist; (#R) rounds 4, 3, 2, 1; (RR) round-robin stage; (Q#) qualification round; (P#) preliminary round; (DNQ) did not qualify; (A) absent; (Z#) Davis/Fed Cup Zonal Group (with number indication) or (PO) play-off; (G) gold, (S) silver or (B) bronze Olympic/Paralympic medal; (NMS) not a Masters tournament; (NTI) not a Tier I tournament; (P) postponed; (NH) not held; (SR) strike rate (events won / competed); (W–L) win–loss record.
To avoid confusion and double counting, these charts are updated at the conclusion of a tournament or when the player's participation has ended.

=== Doubles ===
Tournament	2016	2017	2018	2019	2020	2021	2022	SR	W–L	Win %
Grand Slam tournaments
Australian Open	A	A	1R	A	A	A	A	0 / 1	0–1	0%
French Open	1R	1R	1R	2R	1R	A		0 / 5	1–5	17%
Wimbledon	2R	1R	1R	1R	NH	A		0 / 4	1–4	20%
US Open	1R	1R	1R	A	A	A		0 / 3	0–3	0%
Win–loss	1–3	0–3	0–4	1–2	0–1	0–0	0–0	0 / 13	2–13	13%
WTA 1000
Miami Open	A	1R	A	A	NH	A	A	0 / 1	0–1	0%
Madrid Open	A	1R	A	A	NH	A		0 / 1	0–1	0%
Career statistics
Year-end ranking	53	60	71	86	89	256		$317,156		

== WTA Tour finals ==
=== Doubles: 9 (2 titles, 7 runner-ups) ===
Legend Grand Slam WTA 1000 Premier / WTA 500 (0–1) International / WTA 250 (2–6)	Finals by surface Hard (0–3) Clay (2–2) Grass (0–1) Carpet (0–1)

Result	W–L	Date	Tournament	Tier	Surface	Partner	Opponents	Score
Loss	0–1	Apr 2016	İstanbul Cup, Turkey	International	Clay	(Montenegro) Danka Kovinić	(Romania) Andreea Mitu (Turkey) İpek Soylu	w/o
Win	1–1	Apr 2016	Morocco Open, Morocco	International	Clay	(Serbia) Aleksandra Krunić	(Germany) Tatjana Maria (Romania) Raluca Olaru	6–3, 6–0
Loss	1–2	Jun 2016	Rosmalen Open, Netherlands	International	Grass	(Serbia) Aleksandra Krunić	(Georgia (country)) Oksana Kalashnikova (Kazakhstan) Yaroslava Shvedova	1–6, 1–6
Win	2–2	Jul 2016	Swiss Open, Switzerland	International	Clay	(Spain) Lara Arruabarrena	(Germany) Annika Beck (Russia) Evgeniya Rodina	6–1, 3–6, [10–8]
Loss	2–3	Feb 2017	St. Petersburg Trophy, Russia	Premier	Hard	(Croatia) Darija Jurak	(Latvia) Jeļena Ostapenko (Poland) Alicja Rosolska	6–3, 2–6, [5–10]
Loss	2–4	Oct 2017	Linz Open, Austria	International	Hard (i)	(Russia) Natela Dzalamidze	(Netherlands) Kiki Bertens (Sweden) Johanna Larsson	6–3, 3–6, [4–10]
Loss	2–5	Apr 2018	İstanbul Cup, Turkey	International	Clay	(United Kingdom) Anna Smith	(China) Liang Chen (China) Zhang Shuai	4–6, 4–6
Loss	2–6	Sep 2018	Tournoi de Québec, Canada	International	Carpet (i)	(Croatia) Darija Jurak	(United States) Asia Muhammad (United States) Maria Sanchez	4–6, 3–6
Loss	2–7	Oct 2019	Linz Open, Austria	International	Hard (i)	(Austria) Barbara Haas	(Czech Republic) Barbora Krejčíková (Czech Republic) Kateřina Siniaková	4–6, 3–6

== WTA Challenger finals ==
=== Doubles: 1 (title) ===
Result	Date	Tournament	Surface	Partner	Opponents	Score
Win	May 2016	Bol Ladies Open, Croatia	Clay	(Croatia) Petra Martić	(Romania) Raluca Olaru (Turkey) İpek Soylu	6–3, 6–2

== ITF Circuit finals ==
=== Singles: 9 (4 titles, 5 runner-ups) ===
Legend $25,000 tournaments $10/15,000 tournaments	Finals by surface Hard (1–2) Clay (3–3)

Result	W–L	Date	Tournament	Tier	Surface	Opponent	Score
Loss	0–1	Jun 2009	ITF Cremona, Italy	10,000	Clay	(Italy) Lisa Sabino	4–6, 6–7^{(3–7)}
Loss	0–2	May 2011	ITF Madrid, Spain	10,000	Hard	(Spain) Lucía Cervera Vázquez	4–6, 5–7
Win	1–2	May 2013	ITF Timișoara, Romania	10,000	Clay	(Romania) Bianca Hîncu	3–6, 6–2, 7–5
Loss	1–3	Jul 2013	ITF Prokuplje, Serbia	10,000	Clay	(Bulgaria) Viktoriya Tomova	6–7^{(2–7)}, 2–6
Win	2–3	Sep 2013	ITF Belgrade, Serbia	10,000	Clay	(Serbia) Natalija Kostić	6–3, 6–3
Loss	2–4	Mar 2014	ITF Heraklion, Greece	10,000	Hard	(United Kingdom) Anna Smith	1–6, 3–6
Loss	2–5	Sep 2014	ITF Moscow, Russia	25,000	Clay	(Russia) Evgeniya Rodina	6–7^{(2–7)}, 1–6
Win	3–5	Nov 2018	ITF Heraklion, Greece	15,000	Clay	(Bulgaria) Ani Vangelova	6–2, 7–5
Win	4–5	Oct 2019	Open Andrézieux-Bouthéon, France	15,000	Hard (i)	(France) Manon Léonard	6–0, 7–5

=== Doubles: 54 (32 titles, 22 runner-ups) ===
Legend $100,000 tournaments $80,000 tournaments $50/60,000 tournaments $40,000 tournaments $25,000 tournaments $10/15,000 tournaments	Finals by surface Hard (8–3) Clay (17–19) Grass (1–0) Carpet (6–0)

Result	W–L	Date	Tournament	Tier	Surface	Partner	Opponents	Score
Loss	0–1	Jun 2009	ITF Lenzerheide, Switzerland	10,000	Clay	(Switzerland) Amra Sadiković	(Netherlands) Michelle Gerards (Netherlands) Marcella Koek	3–6, 3–6
Win	1–1	Jun 2009	ITF Davos, Switzerland	10,000	Clay	(Switzerland) Amra Sadiković	(Netherlands) Marcella Koek (Italy) Lisa Sabino	7–5, 6–1
Win	2–1	Mar 2010	ITF Wetzikon, Switzerland	10,000	Carpet (i)	(Switzerland) Amra Sadiković	(Czech Republic) Simona Dobrá (Czech Republic) Tereza Hladíková	6–4, 7–6^{(7–5)}
Loss	2–2	Aug 2010	ITF Innsbruck, Austria	10,000	Clay	(Switzerland) Amra Sadiković	(France) Victoria Larrière (France) Elixane Lechemia	w/o
Win	3–2	Nov 2010	ITF Stockholm, Sweden	10,000	Hard (i)	(Switzerland) Lara Michel	(Denmark) Karen Barbat (Sweden) Anna Brazhnikova	6–3, 6–3
Win	4–2	Mar 2011	ITF Fällanden, Switzerland	10,000	Carpet (i)	(Switzerland) Amra Sadiković	(Slovenia) Dalila Jakupović (Slovenia) Anja Prislan	6–3, 6–3
Loss	4–3	Jun 2011	ITF Madrid, Spain	10,000	Clay	(Italy) Benedetta Davato	(Switzerland) Lisa Sabino (Italy) Andreea Văideanu	4–6, 1–6
Win	5–3	Aug 2011	ITF Trimbach, Switzerland	10,000	Clay	(Germany) Christina Shakovets	(Australia) Marisa Gianotti (Czech Republic) Kateřina Kramperová	6–3, 7–6^{(7–5)}
Win	6–3	Mar 2012	ITF Fällanden, Switzerland	10,000	Carpet (i)	(Switzerland) Amra Sadiković	(Switzerland) Lara Michel (United Kingdom) Emily Webley-Smith	6–7^{(3–7)}, 6–4, [12–10]
Loss	6–4	Jun 2012	ITF Breda, Netherlands	10,000	Clay	(Germany) Carolin Daniels	(Belgium) Ysaline Bonaventure (Bulgaria) Isabella Shinikova	4–6, 6–7^{(5–7)}
Win	7–4	Feb 2013	ITF Kreuzlingen, Switzerland	10,000	Carpet (i)	(Switzerland) Timea Bacsinszky	(Croatia) Matea Mezak (Croatia) Silvia Njirić	6–3, 6–2
Loss	7–5	Sep 2013	ITF Belgrade, Serbia	10,000	Clay	(Serbia) Tamara Čurović	(North Macedonia) Lina Gjorcheska (Romania) Camelia Hristea	0–6, 1–6
Win	8–5	Sep 2013	ITF Dobrich, Bulgaria	25,000	Clay	(Serbia) Teodora Mirčić	(Bulgaria) Isabella Shinikova (Bulgaria) Dalia Zafirova	7–5, 7–6^{(7–5)}
Win	9–5	Sep 2013	ITF Budapest, Hungary	25,000	Clay	(Switzerland) Timea Bacsinszky	(Hungary) Réka Luca Jani (Ukraine) Veronika Kapshay	7–6^{(7–3)}, 6–2
Win	10–5	May 2014	ITF Moscow, Russia	25,000	Clay	(Kazakhstan) Anna Danilina	(Russia) Ekaterina Bychkova (Russia) Evgeniya Rodina	6–3, 6–2
Loss	10–6	Jun 2014	ITF La Marsa, Tunisia	25,000	Clay	(Turkey) Pemra Özgen	(Venezuela) Andrea Gámiz (Russia) Valeria Savinykh	6–1, 6–7^{(6–8)}, [9–11]
Loss	10–7	Jun 2014	ITF Ystad, Sweden	25,000	Clay	(Kazakhstan) Anna Danilina	(Slovenia) Nastja Kolar (Austria) Yvonne Neuwirth	6–7^{(3–7)}, 6–3, [6–10]
Loss	10–8	Jul 2014	ITF Aschaffenburg, Germany	25,000	Clay	(Netherlands) Lesley Kerkhove	(Japan) Rika Fujiwara (Japan) Yuuki Tanaka	1–6, 4–6
Win	11–8	Sep 2014	ITF Moscow, Russia	25,000	Clay	(Kazakhstan) Anna Danilina	(Russia) Valentyna Ivakhnenko (Russia) Yuliya Kalabina	6–1, 4–6, [10–6]
Win	12–8	Sep 2014	ITF Moscow, Russia	25,000	Clay	(Russia) Veronika Kudermetova	(Russia) Alexandra Artamonova (Russia) Polina Monova	7–6^{(12–10)}, 7–5
Loss	12–9	Sep 2014	Royal Cup, Montenegro	25,000	Clay	(Netherlands) Arantxa Rus	(Romania) Alexandra Cadanțu (Liechtenstein) Stephanie Vogt	1–6, 6–3, [2–10]
Win	13–9	Oct 2014	ITF Istanbul, Turkey	25,000	Hard (i)	(Turkey) İpek Soylu	(Turkey) Ayla Aksu (Turkey) Müge Topsel	6–2, 6–4
Win	14–9	Nov 2014	GB Pro-Series Bath, UK	25,000	Hard (i)	(Netherlands) Lesley Kerkhove	(Serbia) Barbara Bonić (Turkey) Pemra Özgen	6–3, 6–1
Loss	14–10	Feb 2015	ITF Beinasco, Italy	25,000	Clay (i)	(Italy) Alice Matteucci	(Netherlands) Demi Schuurs (Chile) Daniela Seguel	4–6, 6–4, [9–11]
Win	15–10	Jun 2015	Surbiton Trophy, UK	50,000	Grass	(Ukraine) Lyudmyla Kichenok	(United Kingdom) Tara Moore (United Kingdom) Nicola Slater	7–6^{(8–6)}, 6–3
Win	16–10	Jun 2015	ITF Ystad, Sweden	25,000	Clay	(Sweden) Cornelia Lister	(Switzerland) Conny Perrin (South Africa) Chanel Simmonds	7–5, 7–6^{(7–5)}
Loss	16–11	Jun 2015	ITF Lenzerheide, Switzerland	25,000	Clay	(Germany) Antonia Lottner	(Spain) Yvonne Cavallé Reimers (Switzerland) Karin Kennel	w/o
Loss	16–12	Jun 2015	Open Porte du Hainaut, France	25,000	Clay	(Argentina) Florencia Molinero	(Belgium) Elise Mertens (Turkey) İpek Soylu	6–7^{(3–7)}, 3–6
Win	17–12	Jul 2015	ITF Turin, Italy	25,000	Clay	(Italy) Alice Matteucci	(Sweden) Susanne Celik (Latvia) Diāna Marcinkēviča	6–2, 7–5
Win	18–12	Jul 2015	ITF Imola, Italy	25,000	Carpet	(Italy) Claudia Giovine	(Greece) Despina Papamichail (United States) Bernarda Pera	7–5, 6–2
Loss	18–13	Aug 2015	ITF Mamaia, Romania	25,000	Clay	(Switzerland) Amra Sadiković	(Russia) Anastasiya Komardina (Georgia (country)) Sofia Shapatava	3–6, 7–5, [8–10]
Win	19–13	Nov 2015	GB Pro-Series Shrewsbury, UK	25,000	Hard (i)	(Italy) Alice Matteucci	(Netherlands) Lesley Kerkhove (Netherlands) Quirine Lemoine	3–6, 6–3, [10–3]
Loss	19–14	Jan 2016	Open Andrézieux-Bouthéon, France	50,000	Hard (i)	(Switzerland) Viktorija Golubic	(Belgium) Elise Mertens (Belgium) An-Sophie Mestach	4–6, 6–3, [7–10]
Win	20–14	Feb 2016	AK Ladies Open, Germany	25,000	Carpet (i)	(Belgium) Ysaline Bonaventure	(Israel) Deniz Khazaniuk (Russia) Maria Marfutina	6–1, 6–4
Loss	20–15	May 2016	Open de Cagnes-sur-Mer, France	100,000	Clay	(Serbia) Aleksandra Krunić	(Romania) Andreea Mitu (Netherlands) Demi Schuurs	4–6, 5–7
Loss	20–16	Sep 2016	ITF Podgorica, Montenegro	25,000	Clay	(Serbia) Ivana Jorović	(Bosnia and Herzegovina) Anita Husarić (Netherlands) Quirine Lemoine	6–3, 4–6, [4–10]
Win	21–16	Aug 2017	Montreux Ladies Open, Switzerland	25,000	Clay	(Switzerland) Amra Sadiković	(Slovakia) Michaela Hončová (Bulgaria) Isabella Shinikova	6–2, 7–5
Win	22–16	Mar 2018	ITF Antalya, Turkey	15,000	Clay	(Sweden) Cornelia Lister	(Russia) Amina Anshba (Kyrgyzstan) Ksenia Palkina	6–0, 5–7, [10–8]
Loss	22–17	May 2018	Empire Slovak Open, Slovakia	100,000	Clay	(United Kingdom) Anna Smith	(Australia) Jessica Moore (Kazakhstan) Galina Voskoboeva	6–0, 3–6, [7–10]
Loss	22–18	Nov 2018	ITF Heraklion, Greece	15,000	Clay	(Poland) Anna Hertel	(Romania) Oana Gavrilă (Israel) Maya Tahan	3–6, 6–1, [3–10]
Win	23–18	May 2019	Open de Cagnes-sur-Mer, France	80,000	Clay	(Russia) Anna Blinkova	(Brazil) Beatriz Haddad Maia (Brazil) Luisa Stefani	4–6, 6–2, [14–12]
Win	24–18	May 2019	Empire Slovak Open, Slovakia	100,000	Clay	(Russia) Anna Blinkova	(Sweden) Cornelia Lister (Czech Republic) Renata Voráčová	7–5, 7–5
Win	25–18	Sep 2019	Verbier Open, Switzerland	25,000	Clay	(Switzerland) Simona Waltert	(Turkey) İpek Soylu (Liechtenstein) Kathinka von Deichmann	6–4, 6–3
Win	26–18	Sep 2019	Montreux Ladies Open, Switzerland (2)	60,000	Clay	(Luxembourg) Mandy Minella	(Switzerland) Ylena In-Albon (Switzerland) Conny Perrin	6–3, 6–4
Loss	26–19	May 2021	ITF Prague, Czech Republic	25,000	Clay	(Romania) Elena-Gabriela Ruse	(Hungary) Anna Bondár (Belgium) Kimberley Zimmermann	6–7^{(5–7)}, 2–6
Win	27–19	Sep 2021	ITF Dijon, France	15,000	Clay	(Switzerland) Naïma Karamoko	(Hungary) Amarissa Kiara Tóth (France) Lucie Wargnier	6–2, 6–2
Win	28–19	Nov 2021	ITF Pétange, Luxembourg	25,000	Hard (i)	(Switzerland) Joanne Züger	(France) Julie Belgraver (France) Lucie Nguyen Tan	6–3, 6–3
Win	29–19	Feb 2022	ITF Mâcon, France	25,000	Hard (i)	(Romania) Andreea Mitu	(United Kingdom) Emily Appleton (United Kingdom) Ali Collins	6–1, 6–1
Loss	29–20	Apr 2022	Bellinzona Ladies Open, Switzerland	60,000	Clay	(Russia) Oksana Selekhmeteva	(United Kingdom) Alicia Barnett (United Kingdom) Olivia Nicholls	7–6^{(9–7)}, 4–6, [7–10]
Win	30–20	May 2022	Koper Open, Slovenia	60,000	Clay	(United Kingdom) Samantha Murray Sharan	(Switzerland) Conny Perrin (Switzerland) Joanne Züger	6–3, 6–2
Win	31–20	Nov 2022	ITF Pétange, Luxembourg	25,000	Hard (i)	(Belgium) Magali Kempen	(Netherlands) Bibiane Schoofs (Netherlands) Rosalie van der Hoek	6–0, 6–4
Loss	31–21	Dec 2022	ITF Sëlva, Italy	25,000	Hard (i)	(Italy) Angelica Moratelli	(Serbia) Katarina Jokić (United States) Taylor Ng	3–6, 2–6
Win	32–21	Feb 2023	ITF Mâcon, France	40,000	Hard (i)	(Belgium) Magali Kempen	(Russia) Darya Astakhova (India) Prarthana Thombare	6–3, 6–4
Loss	32–22	Mar 2023	ITF Murska Sobota, Slovenia	40,000	Hard	(Belgium) Magali Kempen	(Romania) Andreea Mitu (United Kingdom) Harriet Dart	w/o
