= Joanne Züger =

Swiss tennis player

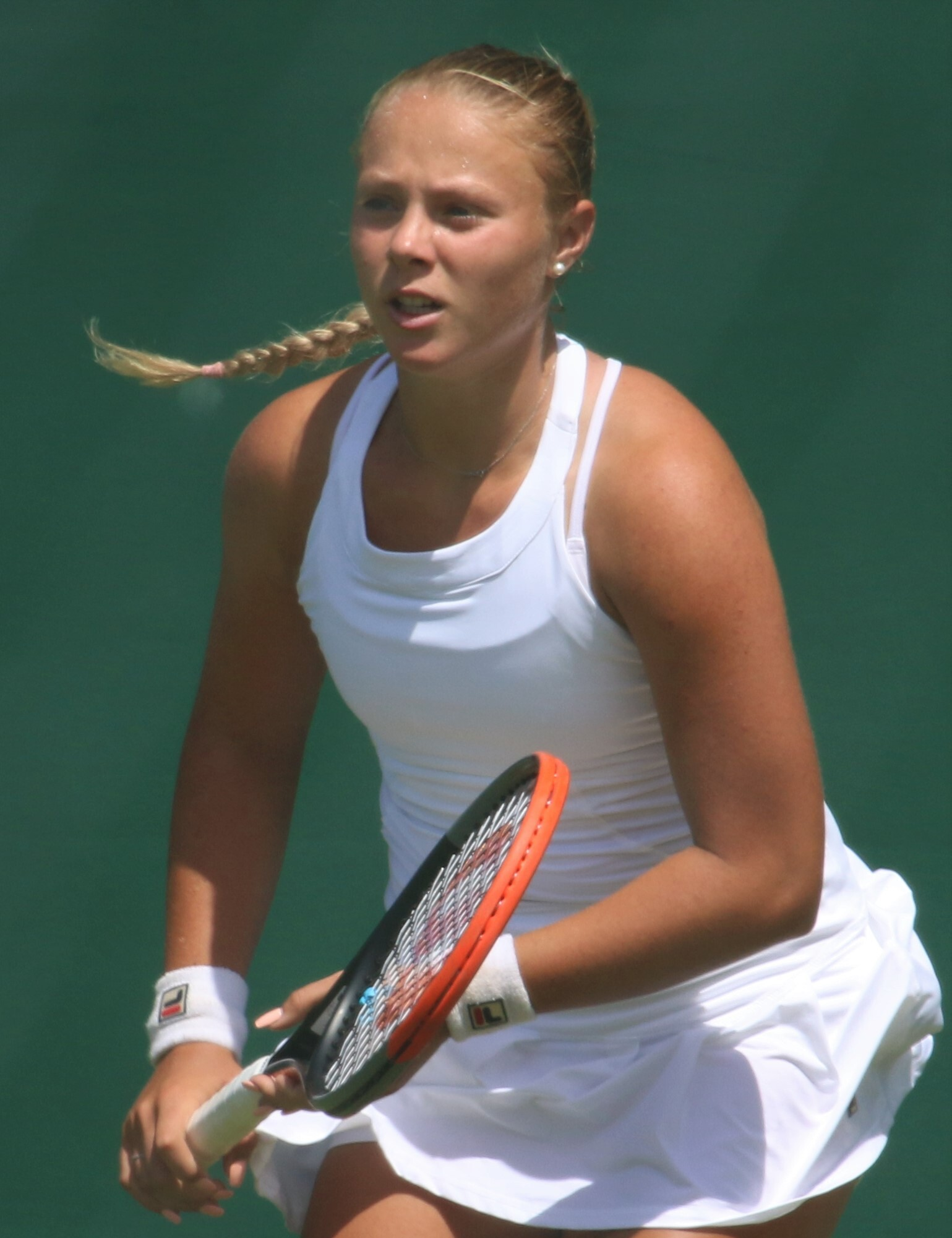
- Züger at the 2022 Wimbledon Championships
- Country (sports): Switzerland
- Born: 17 November 2000 (age 24); Liestal
- Height: 1.70 m (5 ft 7 in)
- Plays: Right (two-handed backhand)
- Prize money: US$ 210,187

Singles
- Career record: 164–117
- Career titles: 2 ITF
- Highest ranking: No. 163 (29 August 2022)

Grand Slam singles results
- Australian Open: Q1 (2023)
- French Open: Q3 (2022)
- Wimbledon: Q1 (2022)
- US Open: Q2 (2022)

Doubles
- Career record: 46–43
- Career titles: 2 ITF
- Highest ranking: No. 284 (1 August 2022)
- Last updated on: 25 July 2024.

Joanne Züger (born 17 November 2000) is an inactive Swiss tennis player.

Züger has a career-high singles ranking by the WTA of 163, achieved on 29 August 2022. She also has a career-high WTA doubles ranking of world No. 284, achieved on 1 August 2022. She has won two singles titles and two doubles titles at tournaments of the ITF Circuit.

== Career ==
Züger made her WTA Tour debut at the 2022 Hamburg European Open, where she qualified for the main draw defeating Anastasia Gasanova in the final round. She won her first WTA Tour-level match defeating Jule Niemeier, before losing in the second round to eventual champion Bernarda Pera.

== Grand Slam performance timelines ==
Key
W	F	SF	QF	#R	RR	Q#	P#	DNQ	A	Z#	PO	G	S	B	NMS	NTI	P	NH

(W) winner; (F) finalist; (SF) semifinalist; (QF) quarterfinalist; (#R) rounds 4, 3, 2, 1; (RR) round-robin stage; (Q#) qualification round; (P#) preliminary round; (DNQ) did not qualify; (A) absent; (Z#) Davis/Fed Cup Zonal Group (with number indication) or (PO) play-off; (G) gold, (S) silver or (B) bronze Olympic/Paralympic medal; (NMS) not a Masters tournament; (NTI) not a Tier I tournament; (P) postponed; (NH) not held; (SR) strike rate (events won / competed); (W–L) win–loss record.
To avoid confusion and double counting, these charts are updated at the conclusion of a tournament or when the player's participation has ended.

=== Singles ===
Tournament	2022	2023	SR	W–L
Australian Open	A	Q1	0 / 0	0–0
French Open	Q3	Q1	0 / 0	0–0
Wimbledon	Q1	A	0 / 0	0–0
US Open	Q2	A	0 / 0	0–0
Win–loss	0–0	0–0	0 / 0	0–0

== ITF Circuit finals ==
=== Singles: 9 (2 titles, 7 runner-ups) ===
Legend $40,000 tournaments (0–1) $25,000 tournaments (0–4) $15,000 tournaments (2–2)	Finals by surface Hard (2–3) Clay (0–4)

Result	W–L	Date	Tournament	Tier	Surface	Opponent	Score
Loss	0–1	Feb 2019	ITF Antalya, Turkey	15,000	Clay	(Japan) Yuki Naito	2–6, 6–3, 3–6
Loss	0–2	Apr 2019	ITF Antalya, Turkey	15,000	Clay	(South Korea) Park So-hyun	2–6, 6–4, 4–6
Win	1–2	Jul 2019	ITF Les Contamines-Montjoie, France	15,000	Hard	(France) Célia Belle Mohr	7–6^{(2)}, 6–0
Win	2–2	Apr 2021	ITF Monastir, Tunisia	15,000	Hard	(Belgium) Magali Kempen	7–6^{(4)}, 5–7, 7–6^{(5)}
Loss	2–3	Jul 2021	Telavi Open, Georgia	25,000	Clay	(Netherlands) Suzan Lamens	5–7, 2–6
Loss	2–4	Oct 2021	ITF Kiryat Motzkin, Israel	25,000	Hard	(Israel) Lina Glushko	3–6, 4–6
Loss	2–5	Mar 2022	ITF Santo Domingo, Dominican Republic	25,000	Hard	(United States) Adriana Reami	3–6, 5–7
Loss	2–6	Oct 2022	Lisboa Open, Portugal	25,000	Clay	(France) Carole Monnet	6–1, 3–6, 2–6
Loss	2–7	Jan 2023	ITF Bhopal, India	40,000	Hard	Anastasia Tikhonova	4–6, 1–6

=== Doubles: 6 (2 titles, 3 runner-ups, 1 not played) ===
Legend $60,000 tournaments (0–1) $25,000 tournaments (1–0) $15,000 tournaments (1–2)	Finals by surface Hard (1–1) Clay (1–2)

Result	W–L	Date	Tournament	Tier	Surface	Partner	Opponents	Score
Win	1–0	Dec 2018	ITF Cairo, Egypt	15,000	Clay	(Slovenia) Nika Radišić	(Romania) Cristina Ene (Italy) Michele Alexandra Zmău	6–3, 6–3
Loss	1–1	Apr 2019	ITF Antalya, Turkey	15,000	Clay	(Switzerland) Marie Mettraux	(Russia) Victoria Mikhaylova (Romania) Andreea Prisăcariu	2–6, 4–6
Finalist (Note: Tournament was cancelled after the completion of the quarterfinals due to ongoing poor weather.)	–	May 2019	ITF Tabarka, Tunisia	15,000	Clay	(Switzerland) Marie Mettraux	(Kazakhstan) Dariya Detkovskaya (Poland) Stefania Rogozińska Dzik	cancelled
Loss	1–2	Sep 2019	ITF Antalya, Turkey	15,000	Hard	(Switzerland) Svenja Ochsner	(Japan) Rina Saigo (Japan) Yukina Saigo	2–6, 0–6
Win	2–2	Nov 2021	ITF Pétange, Luxembourg	25,000	Hard	(Switzerland) Xenia Knoll	(France) Julie Belgraver (France) Lucie Nguyen Tan	6–3, 6–3
Loss	2–3	May 2022	Koper Open, Slovenia	60,000	Clay	(Switzerland) Conny Perrin	(Switzerland) Xenia Knoll (United Kingdom) Samantha Murray Sharan	3–6, 2–6
