= Koper Open =

- 2024 Koper Open

ITF Women's Tour
- Event name: Koper Open
- Location: Koper, Slovenia
- Venue: Tenis klub Pro ten Koper
- Category: ITF Women's World Tennis Tour
- Surface: Clay / outdoor
- Draw: 32S/32Q/16D
- Prize money: $60,000

The Koper Open is a tournament for professional female tennis players played on outdoor clay courts. The event is classified as a $60,000 ITF Women's World Tennis Tour tournament and has been held in Koper, Slovenia, since 2022.

== Past finals ==
=== Singles ===
| Year | Champion | Runner-up | Score |
|---|---|---|---|
| 2025 | (Austria) Julia Grabher | (Georgia (country)) Ekaterine Gorgodze | 6–2, 6–2 |
| 2024 | (Slovenia) Veronika Erjavec | (Slovenia) Polona Hercog | 6–4, 6–3 |
| 2023 | (Spain) Aliona Bolsova | (Romania) Irina Bara | 3–6, 6–2, 4–1, ret. |
| 2022 | (Liechtenstein) Kathinka von Deichmann | (Spain) Andrea Lázaro García | 3–6, 6–3, 6–2 |

=== Doubles ===
| Year | Champions | Runners-up | Score |
|---|---|---|---|
| 2025 | (Slovenia) Kristina Novak (Czech Republic) Ivana Šebestová | Julia Avdeeva; Ekaterina Maklakova | 7–5, 0–6, [10–6] |
| 2024 | (Slovenia) Veronika Erjavec (Czech Republic) Dominika Šalková | (Greece) Sapfo Sakellaridi (Italy) Aurora Zantedeschi | 6–1, 6–3 |
| 2023 | (Romania) Irina Bara (Romania) Andreea Mitu | (Netherlands) Suzan Lamens (Australia) Kaylah McPhee | 6–2, 6–3 |
| 2022 | (Switzerland) Xenia Knoll (United Kingdom) Samantha Murray Sharan | (Switzerland) Conny Perrin (Switzerland) Joanne Züger | 6–3, 6–2 |
