= Veronika Erjavec =

Slovenian tennis player (born 1999)

- Country (sports): Slovenia
- Born: 30 December 1999 (age 26) Slovenia
- Height: 1.67 m (5 ft 6 in)
- Plays: Right (two-handed backhand)
- Prize money: $1,286,392

Singles
- Career record: 298–186
- Career titles: 2 WTA 125
- Highest ranking: No. 84 (18 May 2026)
- Current ranking: No. 158 (2 November 2026)

Grand Slam singles results
- Australian Open: 1R (2025, 2026)
- French Open: 1R (2026)
- Wimbledon: 2R (2025)
- US Open: 1R (2026)

Doubles
- Career record: 169–88
- Career titles: 1 WTA, 5 WTA 125
- Highest ranking: No. 84 (8 June 2026)
- Current ranking: No. 153 (2 November 2026)

Grand Slam doubles results
- French Open: 3R (2026)
- Wimbledon: 1R (2026)

Team competitions
- BJK Cup: 2–7
Medal record
Women's tennis
Representing Slovenia
Mediterranean Games
Bronze medal – third place	2018 Tarragona	Singles
- Last updated on: 6 November 2026.

Veronika Erjavec (born 30 December 1999) is a Slovenian professional tennis player. She has a career-high WTA singles ranking of No. 84, achieved on 18 May 2026, and a best doubles ranking of also No. 84, reached on 8 June 2026.

Erjavec has won one WTA Tour title in doubles at the 2025 Iași Open, with Panna Udvardy. She also earned five WTA 125 doubles titles and two in singles.

== Career ==
=== 2018: Mediterranean Games bronze medal ===
Erjavec won a bronze medal for Slovenia at the Mediterranean Games held in Tarragona, Spain, in June. Erjavec defeated Italian Lucia Bronzetti in bronze medal match. In July, she won the doubles tournament in Prokuplje, Serbia, with her Croatian partner Lea Bošković. In September, she played in the doubles final of the Royal Cup in Podgorica, Montenegro. At the end of the year, she played in doubles finals of ITF tournaments in Italy.

=== 2019–2022: ITF Circuit success ===
Erjavec started the 2019 season at the tournament held in Tabarka, Tunisia. She became champion in doubles with her Bosnian partner, Nefisa Berberović. In May, Erjavec played her first singles final in Croatia at Tučepi. She lost to Czech Johana Marková in the final, but won her second title of the season with Berberović in the doubles final. In June 2019, she reached the third doubles championship of the season, alongside Berberović in Bosnia and Herzegovina.

In May 2022, she won a tournament in Split, Croatia, with her partner Lea Bošković. The duo also won a $25k tournament in Austria. Erjavec then entered the final of the tournament held in Brașov, Romania in June 2022. She won another championship with her Croatian partner Bošković at Tarviso, Italy in July.

=== 2023–2024: First WTA 125 doubles titles ===
In April 2023, Erjavec won her first singles tournament in Osijek, Croatia. Partnering with Dalila Jakupović, she won her first WTA 125 doubles title at the 2023 Iași Open, defeating Irina Bara and Monica Niculescu in the final.

Partnering Darja Semeņistaja, Erjavec won the doubles title at the 2024 Canberra International, overcoming Kaylah McPhee and Astra Sharma in the final.

She was runner-up at the WTA 125 Cali Open, having defeated fourth seed Chloé Paquet, Francesca Jones, Jazmín Ortenzi and Panna Udvardy, before losing the championship match to second seed Irina-Camelia Begu. At the same tournament, partnering with Kristina Mladenovic, Erjavec won the doubles title, defeating Tara Würth and Katarina Zavatska in the final.

=== 2025: Major and top 100 singles debuts, first career doubles title ===
Erjavec made her major main-draw debut at the 2025 Australian Open, after conceding just 13 games across three qualifying matches. However, she lost in the first round to Suzan Lamens, in straight sets.

Teaming with Panna Udvardy, she won her first WTA Tour doubles title at the Iași Open, defeating María Lourdes Carlé and Simona Waltert in the final.

Erjavec won her first WTA 125 singles title at the Changsha Open, overcoming Maria Timofeeva in the final. The following week she made it back-to-back titles by defeating Alina Charaeva in the final at the Huzhou Open and, as a result, reached a new career-high ranking of world No. 99, on 16 September 2025.

== Grand Slam performance timeline ==
Key
W	F	SF	QF	#R	RR	Q#	DNQ	A	NH

(W) winner; (F) finalist; (SF) semifinalist; (QF) quarterfinalist; (#R) rounds 4, 3, 2, 1; (RR) round-robin stage; (Q#) qualification round; (DNQ) did not qualify; (A) absent; (NH) not held; (SR) strike rate (events won / competed); (W–L) win–loss record.
To avoid confusion and double counting, these charts are updated at the conclusion of a tournament or when the player's participation has ended.

Only main-draw results in WTA Tour, Grand Slam tournaments, Fed Cup/Billie Jean King Cup, Hopman Cup, United Cup and Olympic Games are included in win–loss records.

=== Singles ===
Tournament	2024	2025	2026	W–L
Australian Open	Q1	1R	1R	0–2
French Open	Q2	Q3	1R	0–1
Wimbledon	Q1	2R	1R	1–2
US Open	Q2	Q3	1R	0–1
Win–Loss	0–0	1–2	0–4	1–6

== WTA Tour finals ==
=== Doubles: 1 (title) ===
Legend WTA 250 (1–0)	Finals by surface Clay (1–0)	Finals by setting Outdoor (1–0)

Result	W–L	Date	Tournament	Tier	Surface	Partner	Opponents	Score
Win	1–0	Jul 2025	Iași Open, Romania	WTA 250	Clay	(Hungary) Panna Udvardy	(Argentina) María Lourdes Carlé (Switzerland) Simona Waltert	7–5, 6–3

== WTA 125 finals ==
=== Singles: 4 (2 titles, 2 runner-ups) ===
Result	W–L	Date	Tournament	Surface	Opponent	Score
Loss	0–1	Nov 2024	Cali Open, Colombia	Clay	(Romania) Irina-Camelia Begu	3–6, 3–6
Win	1–1	Sep 2025	Changsha Open, China	Clay	Maria Timofeeva	6–1, 6–2
Win	2–1	Sep 2025	Huzhou Open, China	Clay	Alina Charaeva	6–2, 6–1
Loss	2–2	May 2026	Huzhou Open, China	Clay	(Poland) Katarzyna Kawa	0–6, 4–6

=== Doubles: 8 (7 titles, 1 runner-up) ===
Result	W–L	Date	Tournament	Surface	Partner	Opponents	Score
Win	1–0	Jul 2023	Iași Open, Romania	Clay	(Slovenia) Dalila Jakupović	(Romania) Irina Bara (Romania) Monica Niculescu	6–4, 6–4
Win	2–0	Jan 2024	Canberra International, Australia	Hard	(Latvia) Darja Semeņistaja	(Australia) Kaylah McPhee (Australia) Astra Sharma	6–2, 6–4
Win	3–0	Nov 2024	Cali Open, Colombia	Clay	(France) Kristina Mladenovic	(Ukraine) Katarina Zavatska (Croatia) Tara Würth	6–2, 7–6^{(4)}
Loss	3–1	Jun 2025	Grado Tennis Cup, Italy	Clay	(Czech Republic) Dominika Šalková	(United States) Quinn Gleason (Brazil) Ingrid Martins	2–6, 7–5, [5–10]
Win	4–1	Sep 2025	Huzhou Open, China	Clay	(Kazakhstan) Zhibek Kulambayeva	(Japan) Momoko Kobori (Japan) Ayano Shimizu	6–4, 6–2
Win	5–1	Apr 2026	Oeiras Ladies Open, Portugal	Clay	(France) Kristina Mladenovic	(Switzerland) Naïma Karamoko (Latvia) Darja Semeņistaja	6–2, 7–5
Win	6–1	Nov 2026	Cundinamarca Open, Colombia	Clay	(Kazakhstan) Zhibek Kulambayeva	(Czech Republic) Laura Samson (Slovenia) Tamara Zidanšek	5–7, 6–2, [14–12]
Win	7–1	Nov 2026	Copa Colina, Chile	Clay	(Kazakhstan) Zhibek Kulambayeva	(Ukraine) Valeriya Strakhova; Anastasia Tikhonova	6–4, 6–3

== ITF Circuit finals ==
=== Singles: 10 (6 titles, 4 runner-ups) ===
Legend W60/75 tournaments W25/35 tournaments W15 tournaments	Finals by surface Clay (6–4)

Result	W–L	Date	Tournament	Tier	Surface	Opponent	Score
Loss	0–1	May 2019	ITF Tučepi, Croatia	W15	Clay	(Czech Republic) Johana Marková	4–6, 1–6
Loss	0–2	Sep 2019	ITF Kaposvár, Hungary	W25	Clay	(Serbia) Dejana Radanović	2–6, 3–6
Loss	0–3	Aug 2021	Internazionali di Cordenons, Italy	W15	Clay	(Japan) Mana Kawamura	6–7^{(5)}, 5–7
Win	1–3	Apr 2023	ITF Osijek, Croatia	W25	Clay	(Croatia) Tena Lukas	7–5, 6–2
Win	2–3	Jul 2023	ITF Horb, Germany	W25	Clay	(Germany) Anna Gabrić	5–7, 6–2, 6–3
Win	3–3	Aug 2023	Internazionali di Cordenons, Italy	W60	Clay	(Romania) Alexandra Cadanțu-Ignatik	6–3, 6–4
Win	4–3	Oct 2023	ITF Santa Margherita di Pula, Italy	W25	Clay	(Spain) Leyre Romero Gormaz	2–6, 6–4, 7–5
Win	5–3	Apr 2024	Koper Open, Slovenia	W75	Clay	(Slovenia) Polona Hercog	6–4, 6–3
Win	6–3	Jul 2024	ITF Horb am Neckar, Germany	W35	Clay	(Czech Republic) Julie Štruplová	7–5, 6–0
Loss	6–4	Jul 2025	Internazionali di Cordenons, Italy	W75	Clay	(Italy) Nuria Brancaccio	2–6, 1–6

=== Doubles: 34 (22 titles, 12 runner-ups) ===
Legend W60/75 tournaments (3–5) W40/50 tournaments (3–0) W25 tournaments (8–2) W15 tournaments (8–5)	Finals by surface Hard (3–2) Clay (18–9) Carpet (1–1)

Result	W–L	Date	Tournament	Tier	Surface	Partner	Opponents	Score
Loss	0–1	Apr 2018	ITF Antalya, Turkey	W15	Clay	(Slovenia) Nina Potočnik	(Russia) Ulyana Ayzatulina (Russia) Vlada Koval	1–6, 4–6
Win	1–1	Apr 2018	ITF Tučepi, Croatia	W15	Clay	(Bosnia and Herzegovina) Nefisa Berberović	(Croatia) Tena Lukas (Estonia) Saara Orav	6–3, 6–3
Win	2–1	Jul 2018	ITF Prokuplje, Serbia	W15	Clay	(Croatia) Lea Bošković	(Serbia) Barbara Bonić (Australia) Jelena Stojanovic	6–0, 3–6, [10–7]
Loss	2–2	Sep 2018	Royal Cup, Montenegro	W25	Clay	(Bosnia and Herzegovina) Nefisa Berberović	(Czech Republic) Miriam Kolodziejová (Slovenia) Nina Potočnik	6–2, 3–6, [0–10]
Loss	2–3	Dec 2018	ITF Solarino, Italy	W15	Carpet	(Slovenia) Kristina Novak	(Argentina) Catalina Pella (Italy) Miriana Tona	5–7, 3–6
Win	3–3	Dec 2018	ITF Solarino, Italy	W15	Carpet	(Slovenia) Kristina Novak	(Guatemala) Melissa Morales (Guatemala) Kirsten-Andrea Weedon	6–3, 7–6^{(4)}
Win	4–3	Dec 2018	ITF Ortisei, Italy	W15	Hard (i)	(Slovenia) Kristina Novak	(Italy) Verena Hofer (Switzerland) Simona Waltert	6–4, 7–5
Win	5–3	Apr 2019	ITF Tabarka, Tunisia	W15	Clay	(Bosnia and Herzegovina) Nefisa Berberović	(France) Émeline Dartron (France) Marie Témin	4–6, 6–3, [10–7]
Win	6–3	May 2019	ITF Tučepi, Croatia	W15	Clay	(Bosnia and Herzegovina) Nefisa Berberović	(Serbia) Tamara Malešević (Croatia) Antonia Ružić	6–2, 6–2
Win	7–3	Jun 2019	ITF Banja Luka, Bosnia and Herzegovina	W15	Clay	(Bosnia and Herzegovina) Nefisa Berberović	(Czech Republic) Barbora Miklová (Serbia) Elena Milovanović	6–1, 6–3
Loss	7–4	Jul 2019	ITF Prokuplje, Serbia	W15	Clay	(Bosnia and Herzegovina) Nefisa Berberović	(Turkey) İpek Öz (Turkey) Melis Sezer	5–7, 5–7
Loss	7–5	Jul 2019	ITF Prokuplje, Serbia	W15	Clay	(Bosnia and Herzegovina) Nefisa Berberović	(Russia) Darya Astakhova (Slovakia) Laura Svatiková	3–6, 6–0, [6–10]
Win	8–5	Aug 2019	Internazionali di Cordenons, Italy	W25	Clay	(Slovenia) Nika Radišić	(Italy) Martina Caregaro (Switzerland) Lisa Sabino	6–3, 7–5
Loss	8–6	Aug 2021	Internazionali di Cordenons, Italy	W15	Clay	(Bosnia and Herzegovina) Nefisa Berberović	(Italy) Martina Colmegna (United States) Amy Zhu	4–6, 3–6
Win	9–6	Mar 2022	ITF Palmanova, Spain	W15	Clay	(Slovenia) Nina Potočnik	(Italy) Angelica Moratelli (Italy) Aurora Zantedeschi	7–5, 6–3
Win	10–6	May 2022	ITF Split, Croatia	W25	Clay	(Croatia) Lea Bošković	(Japan) Mana Kawamura (Japan) Funa Kozaki	4–6, 6–1, [10–2]
Win	11–6	May 2022	ITF Warmbad-Villach, Austria	W25	Clay	(Croatia) Lea Bošković	(Japan) Miharu Imanishi (Japan) Kanako Morisaki	3–6, 6–3, [11–9]
Loss	11–7	Jun 2022	Brașov Open, Romania	W60	Clay	(Poland) Weronika Falkowska	(Czech Republic) Jesika Malečková (Bulgaria) Isabella Shinikova	6–7^{(5)}, 3–6
Win	12–7	Jun 2022	ITF Tarvisio, Italy	W25	Clay	(Croatia) Lea Bošković	(Romania) Ilona Georgiana Ghioroaie (Romania) Oana Georgeta Simion	6–1, 6–7^{(5)}, [10–7]
Win	13–7	Jul 2022	ITF Perugia, Italy	W25	Clay	(Ukraine) Valeriya Strakhova	(Spain) Ángela Fita Boluda (Italy) Angelica Moratelli	w/o
Loss	13–8	Aug 2022	ITF Braunschweig, Germany	W25	Clay	(Poland) Weronika Falkowska	(Germany) Anna Klasen (Italy) Martina Colmegna	3–6, 6–2, [5–10]
Loss	13–9	Oct 2022	Hamburg Ladies Cup, Germany	W60	Hard (i)	(Norway) Malene Helgø	(Czech Republic) Miriam Kolodziejová (Czech Republic) Jesika Malečková	4–6, 2–6
Loss	13–10	Nov 2022	Open Nantes Atlantique, France	W60	Hard (i)	(United Kingdom) Emily Webley-Smith	(Belgium) Magali Kempen (Chinese Taipei) Wu Fang-hsien	2–6, 4–6
Win	14–10	Mar 2023	Open de Touraine, France	W25	Hard (i)	(Lithuania) Justina Mikulskytė	(United States) Chiara Scholl (Bosnia and Herzegovina) Anita Wagner	6–4, 6–0
Win	15–10	Apr 2023	Split Open, Croatia	W40	Clay	(North Macedonia) Lina Gjorcheska	(Slovenia) Nika Radišić (Croatia) Tara Würth	6–1, 6–4
Win	16–10	May 2023	ITF Otočec, Slovenia	W40	Clay	(Czech Republic) Dominika Šalková	(Croatia) Mariana Dražić (United Kingdom) Emily Webley-Smith	7–5, 6–3
Loss	16–11	Jun 2023	ITF Říčany, Czechia	W60	Clay	(Czech Republic) Dominika Šalková	(Czech Republic) Karolína Kubáňová (Czech Republic) Aneta Kučmová	6–4, 3–6, [4–10]
Win	17–11	Jun 2023	ITF Tarvisio, Italy	W25	Clay	(Czech Republic) Dominika Šalková	(Slovenia) Nika Radišić (Bosnia and Herzegovina) Anita Wagner	6–2, 7–6^{(5)}
Win	18–11	Oct 2023	ITF Santa Margherita di Pula, Italy	W25	Clay	(Lithuania) Justina Mikulskytė	(Italy) Nuria Brancaccio (Italy) Angelica Moratelli	7–6^{(6)}, 6–0
Win	19–11	Jan 2024	Porto Indoor, Portugal	W50	Hard (i)	(Czech Republic) Dominika Šalková	(Portugal) Francisca Jorge (Portugal) Matilde Jorge	4–6, 7–5, [10–8]
Loss	19–12	Apr 2024	Split Open, Croatia	W75	Clay	(Lithuania) Justina Mikulskytė	(Greece) Valentini Grammatikopoulou (India) Prarthana Thombare	4–6, 1–6
Win	20–12	Apr 2024	Koper Open, Slovenia	W75	Clay	(Czech Republic) Dominika Šalková	(Greece) Sapfo Sakellaridi (Italy) Aurora Zantedeschi	6–1, 6–3
Win	21–12	May 2024	Empire Slovak Open, Slovakia	W75	Clay	(Slovenia) Tamara Zidanšek	(Slovenia) Dalila Jakupović (United States) Sabrina Santamaria	6–4, 6–4
Win	22–12	Sep 2024	Pazardzhik Cup, Bulgaria	W75	Clay	(Bosnia and Herzegovina) Anita Wagner	(Bulgaria) Lia Karatancheva (Greece) Sapfo Sakellaridi	7–5, 3–6, [10–5]

== National representation ==
=== Billie Jean King Cup finals ===
==== Doubles (0–2) ====
Edition	Date	Location	Surface	Partnering	Against	Opponents	W/L	Result
2023	Nov 2023	Seville (ESP)	Hard (i)	Ela Nala Milić	Australia	Kimberly Birrell; Storm Hunter	L	5–7, 7–6^{(2)}, [5–10]
2023	Nov 2023	Seville (ESP)	Hard (i)	Ela Nala Milić	Kazakhstan	Anna Danilina; Zhibek Kulambayeva	L	6–2, 4–6, [7–10]

=== Multi-sports event ===
Erjavec made her debut representing Slovenia in multi-sports event at the 2018 Mediterranean Games, she won the women's singles bronze medal.

==== Singles: 1 (bronze medal) ====
Result	Date	Tournament	Surface	Opponent	Score
Bronze	June 2018	Mediterranean Games, Tarragona, Spain	Clay	(Italy) Lucia Bronzetti	2–6, 6–4, 6–3
