= Nina Potočnik =

Slovenian tennis player (born 1997)

- Country (sports): Slovenia
- Born: 12 January 1997 (age 29) Ptuj, Slovenia
- Plays: Right (two-handed backhand)
- Prize money: $107,367

Singles
- Career record: 237–170
- Career titles: 5 ITF
- Highest ranking: No. 257 (13 February 2023)

Doubles
- Career record: 89–58
- Career titles: 7 ITF
- Highest ranking: No. 398 (8 August 2022)

Team competitions
- Fed Cup: 3–3
- Last updated on: 13 July 2026.

Nina Potočnik (born 12 January 1997) is a Slovenian inactive tennis player.

She has a career-high singles ranking of world No. 257, achieved on 13 February 2023. On 8 August 2022, she peaked at No. 398 in the WTA doubles rankings. Potočnik has won five singles titles and seven doubles titles on the ITF Circuit.

She made her Fed Cup debut in 2018.

== ITF Circuit finals ==
=== Singles: 8 (5 titles, 3 runner-ups) ===
| Legend W60 tournaments W25 tournaments W15 tournaments | Finals by surface Clay (5–3) |

| Result | W–L | Date | Tournament | Tier | Surface | Opponent | Score |
|---|---|---|---|---|---|---|---|
| Win | 1–0 | Mar 2017 | ITF Hammamet, Tunisia | W15 | Clay | (Croatia) Ani Mijačika | 6–0, 6–0 |
| Win | 2–0 | Jul 2017 | ITF Tarvisio, Italy | W15 | Clay | (Italy) Federica Bilardo | 6–2, 6–3 |
| Loss | 2–1 | Jul 2019 | ITF Bytom, Poland | W25 | Clay | (Poland) Maja Chwalińska | 3–6, 4–6 |
| Win | 3–1 | Jan 2020 | ITF Antalya, Turkey | W15 | Clay | (Russia) Taisya Pachkaleva | 6–3, 6–2 |
| Win | 4–1 | Feb 2020 | ITF Antalya, Turkey | W15 | Clay | (Bulgaria) Julia Stamatova | 6–3, 6–2 |
| Win | 5–1 | Aug 2022 | ITF Leipzig, Germany | W25+H | Clay | (Germany) Mara Guth | 4–6, 6–2, 7–5 |
| Loss | 5–2 | Sep 2022 | Vrnjačka Banja Open, Serbia | W60 | Clay | (Spain) Aliona Bolsova | 5–7, 1–6 |
| Loss | 5–3 | Jan 2023 | ITF Antalya, Turkiye | W25 | Clay | (Australia) Seone Mendez | 2–6, 5–7 |

=== Doubles: 9 (7 titles, 2 runner-ups) ===
| Legend W100 tournaments W25 tournaments W10/15 tournaments | Finals by surface Hard (0–1) Clay (7–1) |

| Result | W–L | Date | Tournament | Tier | Surface | Partner | Opponents | Score |
|---|---|---|---|---|---|---|---|---|
| Win | 1–0 | May 2015 | ITF Velenje, Slovenia | W10 | Clay | (Slovenia) Natalija Šipek | (Germany) Anna Klasen (Austria) Yvonne Neuwirth | 4–6, 6–3, [10–4] |
| Win | 2–0 | Jun 2016 | ITF Maribor, Slovenia | W10 | Clay | (Slovenia) Sara Palcić | (Slovenia) Manca Pislak (Slovenia) Polona Reberšak | 6–3, 6–2 |
| Win | 3–0 | Jul 2016 | ITF Bad Waltersdorf, Austria | W10 | Clay | (Slovenia) Polona Reberšak | (Slovenia) Nastja Kolar (United Kingdom) Francesca Stephenson | 6–3, 6–4 |
| Win | 4–0 | Aug 2016 | ITF Čakovec, Croatia | W10 | Clay | (Slovenia) Sara Palcić | (Serbia) Bojana Marinković (Bulgaria) Ani Vangelova | 6–4, 6–3 |
| Win | 5–0 | Mar 2017 | ITF Hammamet, Tunisia | W15 | Clay | (Uzbekistan) Arina Folts | (France) Valentine Bacher (France) Emma Léné | 6–4, 6–3 |
| Win | 6–0 | Sep 2018 | Royal Cup, Montenegro | W25 | Clay | (Czech Republic) Miriam Kolodziejová | (Bosnia and Herzegovina) Nefisa Berberović (Slovenia) Veronika Erjavec | 2–6, 6–3, [10–0] |
| Loss | 6–1 | Oct 2019 | Kiskút Open, Hungary | W100 | Clay (i) | (Slovenia) Nika Radišić | (Spain) Georgina García Pérez (Hungary) Fanny Stollár | 1–6, 6–7^{(4)} |
| Loss | 6–2 | Mar 2021 | ITF Bratislava, Slovakia | W15 | Hard (i) | (Croatia) Iva Primorac | (Estonia) Elena Malygina (France) Alice Robbe | 6–7^{(2)}, 2–6 |
| Win | 7–2 | Mar 2022 | ITF Palmanova, Spain | W15 | Clay | (Slovenia) Veronika Erjavec | (Italy) Angelica Moratelli (Italy) Aurora Zantedeschi | 7–5, 6–3 |
