= Ivana Šebestová =

Czech tennis player (born 2001)

- Country (sports): Czech Republic
- Born: 3 March 2001 (age 25) Plzeň, Czech Republic
- Plays: Right-handed (two-handed backhand)
- Prize money: $68,347

Singles
- Career record: 175–167
- Career titles: 2 ITF
- Highest ranking: No. 500 (21 August 2023)
- Current ranking: No. 731 (13 July 2026)

Doubles
- Career record: 115–109
- Career titles: 10 ITF
- Highest ranking: No. 189 (2 February 2026)
- Current ranking: No. 286 (13 July 2026)
- Last updated on: 13 July 2026.

Ivana Šebestová (born 3 March 2001) is a Czech professional tennis player. She has career-high rankings of No. 500 in singles, achieved on 21 August 2023, and No. 189 in doubles, achieved on 2 February 2026.

== Early life ==
Šebestová was born in Plzeň. She plays for TK Arbrex in Ostrava. She also played for Osavi Tennis Team Kalisz in the Polish SuperLIGA.

== Juniors ==
Šebestová represented the Czech Republic at the 2015 ITF World Junior Tennis Finals. In 2017, she reached the singles semifinals and the doubles final of the Grade 5 Charlie Berszakiewicz Memorial in Kraków.

== Professional tour ==
In August 2022, Šebestová and Karolína Kubáňová won the doubles title at the W15 Kottingbrunn Open, defeating Linda Ševčíková and Karolína Vlčková in the final. Later that year, Šebestová won her first professional singles title at the W15 event in Heraklion, defeating Elena Korokozidi in the final. In July 2023, she and Elena Pridankina won the doubles title at the W25 Schönbusch Open in Aschaffenburg; Šebestová also reached the singles quarterfinals of the tournament. She also qualified for the main draw of the ITS Cup, where she reached the second round.

In May 2024, she and Linda Ševčíková won the doubles title at the W15 Kranjska Gora Open. Later that year, she reached back-to-back singles semifinals at the W15 tournaments in Kraków and Bielsko-Biała. In February 2025, she and Cody Wong won the doubles title at the W75 event in Leszno, defeating the top seeded team of Weronika Falkowska and Martyna Kubka in the final. Later that year, she also won the doubles titles at the Koper Open and Macha Lake Open, partnering Kristina Novak and Alena Kovačková, respectively.

== ITF Circuit finals ==
=== Singles: 2 (2 titles) ===
Legend W35 tournaments W15 tournaments (2–0)	Finals by surface Hard (1–0) Clay (1–0)

Result	W–L	Date	Tournament	Tier	Surface	Opponent	Score
Win	1–0	Oct 2022	ITF Heraklion, Greece	W15	Clay	(Greece) Elena Korokozidi	6–0, 7–6^{(6)}
Win	2–0	Nov 2025	ITF Szabolcsveresmart, Hungary	W15	Hard (i)	Sofya Lansere	7–5, 6–4

=== Doubles: 21 (11 titles, 10 runner-ups) ===
Legend
W75 tournaments (4–0)
W50 tournaments (0–1)
W25 tournaments (1–1)
W15 tournaments (6–8)

Result	W–L	Date	Tournament	Tier	Surface	Partner	Opponents	Score
Win	1–0	Mar 2022	ITF Sharm El Sheikh, Egypt	W15	Hard	(Japan) Hiromi Abe	(Italy) Silvia Ambrosio (Romania) Elena-Teodora Cadar	6–4, 1–6, [10–4]
Loss	1–1	May 2022	ITF Heraklion, Greece	W15	Clay	(Germany) Franziska Sziedat	(Greece) Michaela Laki (Greece) Dimitra Pavlou	4–6, 6–7^{(3)}
Loss	1–2	Jul 2022	ITF Aschaffenburg, Germany	W25	Clay	(Czech Republic) Karolína Kubáňová	Irina Khromacheva; Maria Timofeeva	2–6, 7–5, [3–10]
Win	2–2	Aug 2022	ITF Kottingbrunn, Austria	W15	Clay	(Czech Republic) Karolína Kubáňová	(Czech Republic) Linda Ševčíková (Czech Republic) Karolína Vlčková	6–4, 6–0
Win	3–2	Oct 2022	ITF Heraklion, Greece	W15	Clay	(Italy) Silvia Ambrosio	(Romania) Simona Ogescu (Greece) Dimitra Pavlou	7–5, 7–5
Loss	3–3	Nov 2022	ITF Solarino, Italy	W15	Carpet	(Switzerland) Nicole Gadient	(Italy) Samira de Stefano (Italy) Camilla Gennaro	5–7, 6–4, [8–10]
Loss	3–4	Apr 2023	ITF Antalya, Turkey	W15	Clay	(Czech Republic) Denise Hrdinková	(Italy) Virginia Ferrara (Turkey) Ayşegül Mert	5–7, 4–6
Win	4–4	Jul 2023	ITF Aschaffenburg, Germany	W25	Clay	Elena Pridankina	(France) Manon Léonard (France) Lucie Nguyen Tan	2–6, 6–2, [10–5]
Win	5–4	May 2024	ITF Osijek, Croatia	W15	Clay	(Slovakia) Salma Drugdová	(Croatia) Ria Derniković (Croatia) Luna Ivković	6–0, 6–2
Win	6–4	May 2024	ITF Kranjska Gora, Slovenia	W15	Clay	(Czech Republic) Linda Ševčíková	Anastasia Kovaleva (Germany) Emily Welker	6–0, 2–6, [10–3]
Loss	6–5	Jul 2024	ITF Krško, Slovenia	W15	Clay	(Czech Republic) Linda Ševčíková	(Brazil) Camilla Bossi (Czech Republic) Emma Slavíková	3–6, 6–2, [10–12]
Loss	6–6	Aug 2024	ITF Kraków, Poland	W15	Clay	(Slovakia) Salma Drugdová	(Hungary) Adrienn Nagy (Czech Republic) Linda Ševčíková	6–7^{(2)}, 3–6
Loss	6–7	Sep 2024	ITF Trnava, Slovakia	W15	Hard (i)	(Slovakia) Radka Zelníčková	(Slovakia) Katarína Kužmová (Slovakia) Nina Vargová	5–7, 6–4, [6–10]
Loss	6–8	Sep 2024	ITF Trnava, Slovakia	W15	Hard (i)	(Hungary) Adrienn Nagy	(Denmark) Rebecca Munk Mortensen (Denmark) Johanne Svendsen	5–7, 6–7^{(2)}
Win	7–8	Feb 2025	ITF Leszno, Poland	W75	Hard (i)	(Hong Kong) Cody Wong	(Poland) Weronika Falkowska (Poland) Martyna Kubka	6–4, 1–6, [10–4]
Win	8–8	Apr 2025	Koper Open, Slovenia	W75	Clay	(Slovenia) Kristina Novak	Julia Avdeeva; Ekaterina Maklakova	7–5, 0–6, [10–6]
Loss	8–9	May 2025	ITF Merzig, Germany	W15	Clay	(Romania) Arina Vasilescu	(Switzerland) Chelsea Fontenel (France) Tiphanie Lemaître	3–6, 3–6
Win	9–9	Jun 2025	Macha Lake Open, Czech Republic	W75	Clay	(Czech Republic) Alena Kovačková	(Bulgaria) Lia Karatancheva (Czech Republic) Aneta Kučmová	1–6, 7–5, [10–5]
Win	10–9	Jul 2025	ITF Grodzisk Mazowiecki, Poland	W15	Clay	(Slovakia) Salma Drugdová	(Poland) Barbara Kostecka (Poland) Maja Pawelska	6–7^{(4)}, 7–6^{(6)}, [10–3]
Loss	10–10	Nov 2025	Empire Women's Indoor, Slovakia	W50	Hard (i)	Sofya Lansere	(United Kingdom) Alicia Dudeney (Estonia) Elena Malygina	6–3, 3–6, [6–10]
Win	11–10	Jul 2026	ITS Cup, Czech Republic	W75	Clay	(Hungary) Adrienn Nagy	(Finland) Laura Hietaranta (Slovakia) Nina Vargová	3–6, 7–6^{(6)}, [10–5]
