= Pia Lovrič =

Slovenian tennis player (born 2002)

- Country (sports): Slovenia
- Born: 23 April 2002 (age 24) Ljubljana, Slovenia
- Plays: Right (two-handed backhand)
- Prize money: $101,187

Singles
- Career record: 211–145
- Career titles: 5 ITF
- Highest ranking: No. 405 (31 March 2025)
- Current ranking: No. 477 (28 September 2026)

Grand Slam singles results
- Australian Open Junior: 2R (2020)
- French Open Junior: 1R (2019, 2020)
- Wimbledon Junior: 1R (2019)

Doubles
- Career record: 83–67
- Career titles: 6 ITF
- Highest ranking: No. 401 (5 August 2022)
- Current ranking: No. 612 (28 September 2026)

Grand Slam doubles results
- Australian Open Junior: 2R (2020)
- French Open Junior: 1R (2019, 2020)
- Wimbledon Junior: 1R (2019)

Team competitions
- Fed Cup: 3–6
- Last updated on: 2 October 2026.

Pia Lovrič (born 23 April 2002) is a Slovenian tennis player.

Lovrič has a career-high singles ranking by the WTA of 405, reached on 31 March 2025. She also has a career-high WTA doubles ranking of 401, achieved on 5 August 2024.

Lovrič represents Slovenia in the Fed Cup.

== Career ==
She made her WTA Tour main-draw debut as a wildcard entrant at the 2021 Slovenian Open, losing to Alison Riske in the first round.

Given a wildcard entry into the 2023 Ljubljana Open, a WTA 125 tournament, Lovrič defeated Natália Szabanin to reach the second round where she was double bagelled by fourth seed Tamara Zidanšek. Again entering with a wildcard into the 2024 edition of the same tournament, she lost in the first round to fifth seed German player, Ella Seidel.

== ITF Circuit finals ==
=== Singles: 15 (5 titles, 10 runner-ups) ===
Legend W25/35 tournaments W15 tournaments	Finals by surface Hard (1–0) Clay (4–10)

Result	W–L	Date	Tournament	Tier	Surface	Opponent	Score
Loss	0–1	Oct 2019	ITF Tabarka, Tunisia	W15	Clay	(Bulgaria) Julia Stamatova	4–6, 3–6
Win	1–1	Mar 2021	ITF New Delhi, India	W15	Hard	(Russia) Irina Khromacheva	6–3, 6–4
Loss	1–2	Aug 2021	ITF Bratislava, Slovakia	W15	Clay	(Latvia) Darja Semeņistaja	4–6, 3–6
Loss	1–3	Aug 2021	ITF Warmbad-Villach, Austria	W15	Clay	(Italy) Anna Turati	3–6, 2–6
Loss	1–4	Nov 2021	ITF Antalya, Turkey	W15	Clay	(Russia) Diana Shnaider	3–6, 2–6
Loss	1–5	Jan 2022	ITF Blumenau-Gaspar, Brazil	W25	Clay	(Germany) Lena Papadakis	1–6, 6–7^{(6)}
Loss	1–6	Aug 2022	ITF Bad Waltersdorf, Austria	W15	Clay	Polina Leykina	2–6, 3–6
Loss	1–7	Aug 2022	ITF Bad Waltersdorf, Austria	W15	Clay	(France) Tiphanie Lemaître	6–7^{(2)}, 3–6
Loss	1–8	Jul 2024	ITF Rogaška Slatina, Slovenia	W15	Clay	(Netherlands) Stéphanie Visscher	2–6, 5–7
Win	2–8	Aug 2024	ITF Slovenske Konjice, Slovenia	W15	Clay	(Slovakia) Salma Drugdová	6–0, 6–4
Win	3–8	Oct 2024	ITF Heraklion, Greece	W15	Clay	(Bulgaria) Denislava Glushkova	6–3, 6–3
Loss	3–9	Sep 2025	ITF Šibenik, Croatia	W15	Clay	(Croatia) Ana Konjuh	2–6, 2–6
Win	4–9	Oct 2025	ITF Bol, Croatia	W15	Clay	(Serbia) Anastasija Cvetković	7–6^{(2)}, 6–2
Win	5–9	May 2026	ITF Klagenfurt, Austria	W15	Clay	(Italy) Martina Colmegna	4–6, 6–4, 6–4
Loss	5–10	Aug 2026	ITF Trieste, Italy	W35	Clay	(Brazil) Gabriela Cé	6–4, 1–6, 4–6

=== Doubles: 12 (6 titles, 6 runner-ups) ===
Legend W25/35 tournaments W15 tournaments	Finals by surface Hard (1–0) Clay (5–6)

Result	W–L	Date	Tournament	Tier	Surface	Partner	Opponents	Score
Loss	0–1	Aug 2019	ITF Olomouc, Czech Republic	W15	Clay	(Japan) Himari Sato	(Czech Republic) Klára Hájková (Czech Republic) Aneta Laboutková	4–6, 6–2, [4–10]
Loss	0–2	Oct 2019	ITF Tabarka, Tunisia	W15	Clay	(Italy) Sara Ziodato	(Italy) Martina Colmegna (Italy) Aurora Zantedeschi	6–2, 2–6, [9–11]
Win	1–2	Sep 2020	ITF Otočec, Slovenia	W15	Clay	(Slovenia) Tina Cvetkovič	(Hungary) Dorka Drahota-Szabó (Hungary) Adrienn Nagy	6–3, 6–1
Win	2–2	Jan 2021	ITF Antalya, Turkey	W15	Clay	(Hungary) Adrienn Nagy	(Turkey) Ayla Aksu (Bulgaria) Ani Vangelova	6–4, 7–5
Win	3–2	Mar 2021	ITF New Delhi, India	W15	Hard	(Hungary) Adrienn Nagy	(India) Sowjanya Bavisetti (India) Prarthana Thombare	6–2, 6–3
Loss	3–3	Jun 2021	ITF Otočec, Slovenia	W25	Clay	(Burundi) Sada Nahimana	(Norway) Ulrikke Eikeri (Hungary) Réka Luca Jani	7–5, 4–6, [5–10]
Loss	3–4	Aug 2021	ITF Bratislava, Slovakia	W15	Clay	(Hungary) Adrienn Nagy	(Slovakia) Chantal Škamlová (Slovakia) Radka Zelníčková	3–6, 6–7^{(5)}
Win	4–4	Aug 2021	ITF Warmbad-Villach, Austria	W15	Clay	(Italy) Melania Delai	(Bosnia and Herzegovina) Anita Husarić (Russia) Aleksandra Pospelova	0–6, 6–2, [10–3]
Loss	4–5	Mar 2022	ITF Marrakech, Morocco	W15	Clay	(Italy) Melania Delai	(Switzerland) Naïma Karamoko (Portugal) Inês Murta	2–6, 4–6
Win	5–5	Jul 2023	ITF Koge, Denmark	W25	Clay	(Hungary) Adrienn Nagy	(France) Tiphanie Lemaître; Anna Zyryanova	6–4, 6–0
Win	6–5	Jul 2024	ITF Torino, Italy	W35	Clay	(Slovenia) Živa Falkner	(Argentina) Julieta Lara Estable (Chile) Fernanda Labraña	1–6, 6–2, [12–10]
Loss	6–6	Mar 2025	ITF Sabadell, Spain	W35	Clay	(Slovenia) Živa Falkner	(Spain) Aliona Bolsova (Switzerland) Ylena In-Albon	4–6, 0–6

== Junior finals ==
=== ITF Junior Circuit ===
==== Singles: 5 (1 title, 4 runner-ups) ====
Legend
Category G2 (1–1)
Category G4 (0–3)

Result	W–L	Date	Tournament	Tier	Surface	Opponent	Score
Loss	0–1	Nov 2017	ITF Maribor, Slovenia	G4	Carpet (i)	(Czech Republic) Kristýna Lavičková	1–6, 1–6
Loss	0–2	Sep 2018	ITF Mostar, Bosnia and Herzegovina	G4	Clay	(Ukraine) Viktoriya Petrenko	3–6, 3–6
Loss	0–3	Dec 2018	ITF Maribor, Slovenia	G4	Carpet (i)	(France) Julie Belgraver	4–6, 3–6
Win	1–3	Apr 2019	ITF Florence, Italy	G2	Clay	(Italy) Sara Ziodato	6–1, 6–2
Loss	1–4	Sep 2019	ITF Novi Sad, Serbia	G2	Clay	(Russia) Maria Bondarenko	3–6, 1–6

==== Doubles: 14 (6 titles, 8 runner-ups) ====
Legend (W–L)
Category G2 (1–3)
Category G4 (4–4)
Category G5 (1–1)

Result	W–L	Date	Tournament	Tier	Surface	Partner	Opponents	Score
Win	1–0	Jan 2017	ITF Ramat Gan, Israel	G5	Hard	(Slovenia) Živa Falkner	(Latvia) Darja Semenistaja (Latvia) Marija Semenistaja	4–6, 6–3, [11–9]
Loss	1–1	Apr 2017	ITF Doha, Qatar	G4	Hard	(Slovenia) Živa Falkner	(Denmark) Olga Helmi (Germany) Estella Jäger	3–6, 3–6
Loss	1–2	May 2017	ITF Ulcinj, Montenegro	G4	Clay	(Slovenia) Živa Falkner	(Spain) Laura López Giese (Greece) Galateia Mesochoritou	4–6, 6–7^{(3)}
Win	2–2	Jul 2017	ITF Corfu, Greece	G4	Carpet	(Turkey) Betina Tokaç	(Greece) Gabriella Charalampidi (Cyprus) Eleni Louka	6–2, 7–5
Loss	2–3	Sep 2017	ITF Mostar, BiH	G4	Clay	(Slovenia) Živa Falkner	(Russia) Victoria Mikhaylova (Romania) Andreea Velcea	7–6^{(4)}, 2–6, [7–10]
Win	3–3	Jan 2018	ITF Oberpullendorf, Austria	G4	Carpet (i)	(Slovenia) Tina Cvetkovič	(Austria) Irina Dshandshgava (Austria) Elisabeth Kölbl	6–1, 6–2
Loss	3–4	May 2018	ITF Skopje, North Macedonia	G5	Clay	(Croatia) Laura Mašić	(Estonia) Saara Orav (Switzerland) Julie Sappl	w/o
Win	4–4	Jul 2018	ITF Wels, Austria	G4	Clay	(Slovenia) Maja Makorič	(Austria) Anna Gross (Austria) Emily Meyer	6–0, 6–2
Win	5–4	Sep 2018	ITF Mostar, Bosnia & Herzegovina	G4	Clay	(Slovenia) Maja Makorič	(Croatia) Lucija Ćirić Bagarić (Croatia) Tara Würth	6–4, 6–0
Loss	5–5	Dec 2018	ITF Maribor, Slovenia	G4	Carpet (i)	(Slovenia) Maja Makorič	(Slovenia) Sheila Glavaš (Hungary) Amarissa Tóth	4–6, 6–3, [4–10]
Win	6–5	Jan 2019	ITF Bratislava, Slovakia	G2	Hard (i)	(Slovenia) Živa Falkner	(Poland) Aleksandra Julia Jeleń (Czech Republic) Markéta Panáčková	6–1, 6–3
Loss	6–6	Aug 2019	ITF Székesfehérvár, Hungary	G2	Clay	(Slovenia) Živa Falkner	(Belarus) Evialina Laskevich (Czech Republic) Linda Nosková	1–6, 1–6
Loss	6–7	Sep 2019	ITF Győr, Hungary	G2	Clay	(Slovenia) Živa Falkner	(Germany) Mara Guth (Germany) Julia Middendorf	3–6, 2–6
Loss	6–8	Sep 2019	ITF Novi Sad, Serbia	G2	Clay	(Croatia) Tara Würth	(Russia) Maria Bondarenko (Belarus) Jana Kolodynska	3–6, 2–6

== National representation ==
=== Billie Jean King Cup ===
Lovrič made her Billie Jean King Cup debut for Slovenia in 2020, while the team was competing in the Europe/Africa Zone Group I, when she was 17 years and 289 days old.

==== BJK Cup participation ====
Group membership World Group World Group Play-off World Group II World Group II Play-off Europe/Africa Group (2–3)	Matches by surface Hard (1–0) Clay (1–3)	Matches by type Singles (1–1) Doubles (1–2)	Matches by setting Outdoors (2–3)

===== Doubles (1–2) =====
Edition	Stage	Date	Location	Against	Surface	Partner	Opponents	W/L	Score
2021 Billie Jean King Cup	ZG1 Pool B	6 Feb 2020	Esch-sur-Alzette, Luxembourg	Poland	Hard (i)	Kaja Juvan	Maja Chwalińska; Alicja Rosolska	W	7–5, 6–0
2022 Billie Jean King Cup	ZG1 Pool B	11 Apr 2022	Antalya, Turkey	(Georgia (country)) Georgia	Clay	Živa Falkner	Mariam Bolkvadze; Oksana Kalashnikova	L	6–3, 6–7^{(5–7)}, 4–6
2022 Billie Jean King Cup	ZG1 Pool B	13 Apr 2022	Antalya, Turkey	Croatia	Clay	Lara Smejkal	Petra Martić; Donna Vekić	L	4–6, 4–6
