= 2021 ITF Women's World Tennis Tour (April–June) =

The 2021 ITF Women's World Tennis Tour is the 2021 edition of the second-tier tour for women's professional tennis. It is organised by the International Tennis Federation and is a tier below the WTA Tour. The ITF Women's World Tennis Tour includes tournaments with prize money ranging from $15,000 up to $100,000.

== Key ==
Category
W100 tournaments
W80 tournaments
W60 tournaments
W25 tournaments
W15 tournaments

== Month ==
=== April ===
Week of	Tournament	Winner	Runners-up	Semifinalists	Quarterfinalists
April 5	ITF Women's World Tennis Tour – Bellinzona; Bellinzona, Switzerland; Clay; W60; Singles Draw – Doubles Draw	(Austria) Julia Grabher; 6–2, 6–3	(Italy) Lucia Bronzetti	(Georgia (country)) Ekaterine Gorgodze (Switzerland) Simona Waltert	(Germany) Mona Barthel (Italy) Bianca Turati (North Macedonia) Lina Gjorcheska (Croatia) Jana Fett
April 5	ITF Women's World Tennis Tour – Bellinzona; Bellinzona, Switzerland; Clay; W60; Singles Draw – Doubles Draw	(Kazakhstan) Anna Danilina (Georgia (country)) Ekaterine Gorgodze; 7–5, 6–3	(Canada) Rebecca Marino (Japan) Yuki Naito	(Georgia (country)) Ekaterine Gorgodze (Switzerland) Simona Waltert	(Germany) Mona Barthel (Italy) Bianca Turati (North Macedonia) Lina Gjorcheska (Croatia) Jana Fett
April 5	Córdoba, Argentina; Clay; W25; Singles and Doubles Draws	(Brazil) Beatriz Haddad Maia; 6–2, 6–2	(Hungary) Panna Udvardy	(Brazil) Carolina Alves (Russia) Amina Anshba	(Switzerland) Conny Perrin (Spain) María Gutiérrez Carrasco (Argentina) María Lourdes Carlé (Chile) Bárbara Gatica
April 5	Córdoba, Argentina; Clay; W25; Singles and Doubles Draws	(Russia) Amina Anshba (Hungary) Panna Udvardy; 6–3, 6–3	(Chile) Bárbara Gatica (Brazil) Rebeca Pereira	(Brazil) Carolina Alves (Russia) Amina Anshba	(Switzerland) Conny Perrin (Spain) María Gutiérrez Carrasco (Argentina) María Lourdes Carlé (Chile) Bárbara Gatica
April 5	Sharm El Sheikh, Egypt; Hard; W15; Singles and Doubles Draws	(Chinese Taipei) Lee Ya-hsuan; 6–3, 6–3	(Australia) Olivia Gadecki	(Czech Republic) Anna Sisková (United Kingdom) Sarah Beth Grey	(Romania) Arina Vasilescu (New Zealand) Paige Hourigan (Italy) Cristiana Ferrando (United Kingdom) Katie Boulter
April 5	Sharm El Sheikh, Egypt; Hard; W15; Singles and Doubles Draws	(United Kingdom) Alicia Barnett (Israel) Lina Glushko; 6–4, 6–2	(Romania) Elena-Teodora Cadar (Australia) Olivia Gadecki	(Czech Republic) Anna Sisková (United Kingdom) Sarah Beth Grey	(Romania) Arina Vasilescu (New Zealand) Paige Hourigan (Italy) Cristiana Ferrando (United Kingdom) Katie Boulter
April 5	Shymkent, Kazakhstan; Clay; W15; Singles and Doubles Draws	(United States) Jessie Aney; 6–4, 6–2	(Belarus) Evialina Laskevich	(Russia) Ekaterina Makarova (Russia) Alina Silich	(Uzbekistan) Sabina Sharipova (Russia) Ekaterina Yashina (Russia) Anastasia Tikhonova (Slovakia) Katarína Kužmová
April 5	Shymkent, Kazakhstan; Clay; W15; Singles and Doubles Draws	(Russia) Anzhelika Isaeva (Russia) Ekaterina Makarova; 7–6^{(7–4)}, 6–3	(Uzbekistan) Sabina Sharipova (Russia) Ekaterina Yashina	(Russia) Ekaterina Makarova (Russia) Alina Silich	(Uzbekistan) Sabina Sharipova (Russia) Ekaterina Yashina (Russia) Anastasia Tikhonova (Slovakia) Katarína Kužmová
April 5	Monastir, Tunisia; Hard; W15; Singles and Doubles Draws	(France) Salma Djoubri; 6–3, 6–4	(Belgium) Magali Kempen	(Croatia) Antonia Ružić (Romania) Ilona Georgiana Ghioroaie	(Italy) Chiara Catini (Belarus) Anna Kubareva (France) Yasmine Mansouri (Russia) Anastasia Pribylova
April 5	Monastir, Tunisia; Hard; W15; Singles and Doubles Draws	(Belgium) Magali Kempen (Belgium) Chelsea Vanhoutte; 6–4, 6–1	(United States) Emma Davis (Denmark) Olivia Gram	(Croatia) Antonia Ružić (Romania) Ilona Georgiana Ghioroaie	(Italy) Chiara Catini (Belarus) Anna Kubareva (France) Yasmine Mansouri (Russia) Anastasia Pribylova
April 5	Antalya, Turkey; Clay; W15; Singles and Doubles Draws	(Romania) Andreea Roșca; 7–5, 6–3	(Czech Republic) Miriam Kolodziejová	(Spain) Rosa Vicens Mas (Romania) Andreea Prisăcariu	(Slovenia) Živa Falkner (Italy) Nuria Brancaccio (Italy) Lisa Pigato (Italy) Flaminia Scarà
April 5	Antalya, Turkey; Clay; W15; Singles and Doubles Draws	(South Korea) Lee So-ra (Japan) Misaki Matsuda; 6–2, 6–3	(Czech Republic) Lucie Havlíčková (Czech Republic) Miriam Kolodziejová	(Spain) Rosa Vicens Mas (Romania) Andreea Prisăcariu	(Slovenia) Živa Falkner (Italy) Nuria Brancaccio (Italy) Lisa Pigato (Italy) Flaminia Scarà
April 12	Oeiras Ladies Open; Oeiras, Portugal; Clay; W60; Singles Draw – Doubles Draw	(Slovenia) Polona Hercog; Walkover	(France) Clara Burel	(Ukraine) Anhelina Kalinina (Spain) Georgina García Pérez	(Italy) Lucia Bronzetti (Spain) Eva Guerrero Álvarez (United Kingdom) Francesca Jones (Greece) Despina Papamichail
April 12	Oeiras Ladies Open; Oeiras, Portugal; Clay; W60; Singles Draw – Doubles Draw	(Belarus) Lidziya Marozava (Romania) Andreea Mitu; 3–6, 6–4, [10–3]	(Russia) Marina Melnikova (Switzerland) Conny Perrin	(Ukraine) Anhelina Kalinina (Spain) Georgina García Pérez	(Italy) Lucia Bronzetti (Spain) Eva Guerrero Álvarez (United Kingdom) Francesca Jones (Greece) Despina Papamichail
April 12	Calvi, France; Hard; W25+H; Singles and Doubles Draws	(Russia) Valeria Savinykh; 6–1, 6–4	(Switzerland) Susan Bandecchi	(France) Amandine Hesse (Italy) Lucrezia Stefanini	(Slovakia) Viktória Morvayová (France) Audrey Albié (Italy) Jessica Pieri (France) Jade Suvrijn
April 12	Calvi, France; Hard; W25+H; Singles and Doubles Draws	(North Macedonia) Lina Gjorcheska (France) Amandine Hesse; 7–5, 6–4	(France) Audrey Albié (France) Léolia Jeanjean	(France) Amandine Hesse (Italy) Lucrezia Stefanini	(Slovakia) Viktória Morvayová (France) Audrey Albié (Italy) Jessica Pieri (France) Jade Suvrijn
April 12	Cairo, Egypt; Clay; W15; Singles and Doubles Draws	(Russia) Elina Avanesyan; 6–1, 6–0	(Japan) Eri Shimizu	(Egypt) Sandra Samir (Russia) Anastasia Zolotareva	(Spain) Leyre Romero Gormaz (Germany) Emily Seibold (Slovenia) Nastja Kolar (Netherlands) Noa Liauw a Fong
April 12	Cairo, Egypt; Clay; W15; Singles and Doubles Draws	(Russia) Elina Avanesyan (South Korea) Park So-hyun; 6–4, 6–4	(Slovakia) Barbora Matúšová (Russia) Anastasia Zolotareva	(Egypt) Sandra Samir (Russia) Anastasia Zolotareva	(Spain) Leyre Romero Gormaz (Germany) Emily Seibold (Slovenia) Nastja Kolar (Netherlands) Noa Liauw a Fong
April 12	Shymkent, Kazakhstan; Clay; W15; Singles and Doubles Draws	(United States) Jessie Aney; 5–7, 7–6^{(8–6)}, 6–0	(Serbia) Tamara Čurović	(Georgia (country)) Mariam Dalakishvili (Belarus) Evialina Laskevich	(Russia) Valeriya Olyanovskaya (Russia) Anastasia Tikhonova (Russia) Ekaterina Makarova (Kazakhstan) Gozal Ainitdinova
April 12	Shymkent, Kazakhstan; Clay; W15; Singles and Doubles Draws	(Kazakhstan) Gozal Ainitdinova (Kazakhstan) Zhibek Kulambayeva; 6–2, 5–7, [10–7]	(Ukraine) Viktoriia Dema (Russia) Anna Ureke	(Georgia (country)) Mariam Dalakishvili (Belarus) Evialina Laskevich	(Russia) Valeriya Olyanovskaya (Russia) Anastasia Tikhonova (Russia) Ekaterina Makarova (Kazakhstan) Gozal Ainitdinova
April 12	Monastir, Tunisia; Hard; W15; Singles and Doubles Draws	(Switzerland) Joanne Züger; 7–6^{(7–4)}, 5–7, 7–6^{(7–5)}	(Belgium) Magali Kempen	(Belarus) Anna Kubareva (Czech Republic) Monika Kilnarová	(Czech Republic) Linda Nosková (France) Salma Djoubri (New Zealand) Paige Hourigan (Japan) Miharu Imanishi
April 12	Monastir, Tunisia; Hard; W15; Singles and Doubles Draws	(New Zealand) Paige Hourigan (Australia) Alexandra Osborne; 4–1, ret.	(Belgium) Magali Kempen (Belgium) Chelsea Vanhoutte	(Belarus) Anna Kubareva (Czech Republic) Monika Kilnarová	(Czech Republic) Linda Nosková (France) Salma Djoubri (New Zealand) Paige Hourigan (Japan) Miharu Imanishi
April 12	Antalya, Turkey; Clay; W15; Singles and Doubles Draws	(Ukraine) Anastasiya Soboleva; 6–0, 7–6^{(7–5)}	(Italy) Nuria Brancaccio	(France) Alice Ramé (United Kingdom) Amanda Carreras	(Italy) Lisa Pigato (Russia) Vlada Koval (Greece) Sapfo Sakellaridi (Burundi) Sada Nahimana
April 12	Antalya, Turkey; Clay; W15; Singles and Doubles Draws	(Israel) Shavit Kimchi (Hungary) Adrienn Nagy; 5–7, 6–2, [10–8]	(South Korea) Lee So-ra (Japan) Misaki Matsuda	(France) Alice Ramé (United Kingdom) Amanda Carreras	(Italy) Lisa Pigato (Russia) Vlada Koval (Greece) Sapfo Sakellaridi (Burundi) Sada Nahimana
April 19	Oeiras, Portugal; Clay; W25; Singles and Doubles Draws	(Ukraine) Anhelina Kalinina; 6–4, 4–6, 6–4	(South Korea) Jang Su-jeong	(Switzerland) Simona Waltert (Australia) Seone Mendez	(Luxembourg) Mandy Minella (Spain) Eva Guerrero Álvarez (Austria) Julia Grabher (Russia) Marina Melnikova
April 19	Oeiras, Portugal; Clay; W25; Singles and Doubles Draws	(Netherlands) Suzan Lamens (Russia) Marina Melnikova; 6–3, 6–1	(Russia) Natela Dzalamidze (Russia) Sofya Lansere	(Switzerland) Simona Waltert (Australia) Seone Mendez	(Luxembourg) Mandy Minella (Spain) Eva Guerrero Álvarez (Austria) Julia Grabher (Russia) Marina Melnikova
April 19	Cairo, Egypt; Clay; W15; Singles and Doubles Draws	(Russia) Maria Timofeeva; 6–3, 6–3	(Egypt) Sandra Samir	(Spain) Claudia Hoste Ferrer (Russia) Elina Avanesyan	(Germany) Silvia Ambrosio (Armenia) Ani Amiraghyan (Hungary) Vanda Lukács (Slovenia) Nastja Kolar
April 19	Cairo, Egypt; Clay; W15; Singles and Doubles Draws	(Russia) Elina Avanesyan (Russia) Maria Timofeeva; 1–6, 6–4, [10–8]	(Netherlands) Isabelle Haverlag (Netherlands) Merel Hoedt	(Spain) Claudia Hoste Ferrer (Russia) Elina Avanesyan	(Germany) Silvia Ambrosio (Armenia) Ani Amiraghyan (Hungary) Vanda Lukács (Slovenia) Nastja Kolar
April 19	Monastir, Tunisia; Hard; W15; Singles and Doubles Draws	(New Zealand) Paige Hourigan; 6–3, 6–2	(Czech Republic) Monika Kilnarová	(Hungary) Amarissa Kiara Tóth (Czech Republic) Linda Nosková	(Netherlands) Stéphanie Visscher (Latvia) Daniela Vismane (Spain) Rebeka Masarova (Netherlands) Eva Vedder
April 19	Monastir, Tunisia; Hard; W15; Singles and Doubles Draws	(Romania) Karola Bejenaru (Romania) Ilona Georgiana Ghioroaie; 6–2, 6–0	(Spain) Rebeka Masarova (Latvia) Daniela Vismane	(Hungary) Amarissa Kiara Tóth (Czech Republic) Linda Nosková	(Netherlands) Stéphanie Visscher (Latvia) Daniela Vismane (Spain) Rebeka Masarova (Netherlands) Eva Vedder
April 19	Antalya, Turkey; Clay; W15; Singles and Doubles Draws	(Burundi) Sada Nahimana; 6–4, 7–6^{(10–8)}	(Ukraine) Anastasiya Soboleva	(Switzerland) Ylena In-Albon (Slovenia) Živa Falkner	(Switzerland) Valentina Ryser (Russia) Erika Andreeva (Japan) Misaki Matsuda (Italy) Nuria Brancaccio
April 19	Antalya, Turkey; Clay; W15; Singles and Doubles Draws	(Australia) Olivia Gadecki (Burundi) Sada Nahimana; 6–3, 1–6, [11–9]	(South Korea) Lee So-ra (Japan) Misaki Matsuda	(Switzerland) Ylena In-Albon (Slovenia) Živa Falkner	(Switzerland) Valentina Ryser (Russia) Erika Andreeva (Japan) Misaki Matsuda (Italy) Nuria Brancaccio
April 26	Zagreb Ladies Open; Zagreb, Croatia; Clay; W60; Singles Draw – Doubles Draw	(Ukraine) Anhelina Kalinina; 6–1, 6–3	(Russia) Kamilla Rakhimova	(Romania) Alexandra Dulgheru (Italy) Jessica Pieri	(Slovakia) Kristína Kučová (Croatia) Jana Fett (Germany) Jule Niemeier (Austria) Barbara Haas
April 26	Zagreb Ladies Open; Zagreb, Croatia; Clay; W60; Singles Draw – Doubles Draw	(Austria) Barbara Haas (Poland) Katarzyna Kawa; 7–6^{(7–1)}, 5–7, [10–6]	(Romania) Andreea Prisăcariu (Slovenia) Nika Radišić	(Romania) Alexandra Dulgheru (Italy) Jessica Pieri	(Slovakia) Kristína Kučová (Croatia) Jana Fett (Germany) Jule Niemeier (Austria) Barbara Haas
April 26	Boar's Head Resort Women's Open; Charlottesville, United States; Clay; W60; Singles Draw – Doubles Draw	(United States) Claire Liu; 3–6, 6–4, 4–1, ret.	(China) Wang Xinyu	(United States) Sachia Vickery (United Kingdom) Katie Boulter	(United States) Allie Kiick (United Kingdom) Harriet Dart (United States) Alycia Parks (United States) Hailey Baptiste
April 26	Boar's Head Resort Women's Open; Charlottesville, United States; Clay; W60; Singles Draw – Doubles Draw	(Kazakhstan) Anna Danilina (Australia) Arina Rodionova; 6–1, 6–3	(New Zealand) Erin Routliffe (Indonesia) Aldila Sutjiadi	(United States) Sachia Vickery (United Kingdom) Katie Boulter	(United States) Allie Kiick (United Kingdom) Harriet Dart (United States) Alycia Parks (United States) Hailey Baptiste
April 26	Oeiras, Portugal; Clay; W25; Singles and Doubles Draws	(Spain) María Gutiérrez Carrasco; 6–3, 6–2	(Russia) Marina Melnikova	(Germany) Katharina Gerlach (Canada) Carol Zhao	(Norway) Malene Helgø (Greece) Valentini Grammatikopoulou (Brazil) Carolina Alves (Latvia) Diāna Marcinkēviča
April 26	Oeiras, Portugal; Clay; W25; Singles and Doubles Draws	(Hungary) Adrienn Nagy (South Korea) Park So-hyun; 6–4, 6–0	(India) Riya Bhatia (Brazil) Gabriela Cé	(Germany) Katharina Gerlach (Canada) Carol Zhao	(Norway) Malene Helgø (Greece) Valentini Grammatikopoulou (Brazil) Carolina Alves (Latvia) Diāna Marcinkēviča
April 26	Cairo, Egypt; Clay; W15; Singles and Doubles Draws	(Russia) Elina Avanesyan; 3–6, 6–4, 6–4	(Kazakhstan) Zhibek Kulambayeva	(South Africa) Zoë Kruger (Egypt) Lamis Alhussein Abdel Aziz	(Italy) Melania Delai (Spain) Leyre Romero Gormaz (South Africa) Isabella Kruger (Italy) Nicole Fossa Huergo
April 26	Cairo, Egypt; Clay; W15; Singles and Doubles Draws	(Italy) Nicole Fossa Huergo (Kazakhstan) Zhibek Kulambayeva; 6–3, 6–2	(Russia) Elina Avanesyan (Romania) Oana Gavrilă	(South Africa) Zoë Kruger (Egypt) Lamis Alhussein Abdel Aziz	(Italy) Melania Delai (Spain) Leyre Romero Gormaz (South Africa) Isabella Kruger (Italy) Nicole Fossa Huergo
April 26	Monastir, Tunisia; Hard; W15; Singles and Doubles Draws	(Czech Republic) Monika Kilnarová; 6–4, 7–6^{(7–5)}	(Latvia) Daniela Vismane	(Japan) Erika Sema (United States) Dasha Ivanova	(Japan) Miharu Imanishi (Denmark) Olga Helmi (Finland) Anastasia Kulikova (Netherlands) Eva Vedder
April 26	Monastir, Tunisia; Hard; W15; Singles and Doubles Draws	(Netherlands) Eva Vedder (Netherlands) Stéphanie Visscher; 6–0, 6–4	(United States) Emma Davis (Japan) Erika Sema	(Japan) Erika Sema (United States) Dasha Ivanova	(Japan) Miharu Imanishi (Denmark) Olga Helmi (Finland) Anastasia Kulikova (Netherlands) Eva Vedder
April 26	Antalya, Turkey; Clay; W15; Singles and Doubles Draws	(Australia) Olivia Gadecki; 6–3, 6–2	(Russia) Julia Avdeeva	(Russia) Polina Leykina (Japan) Shiho Akita	(Czech Republic) Darja Viďmanová (Slovenia) Živa Falkner (Belarus) Kristina Dmitruk (Austria) Tamira Paszek
April 26	Antalya, Turkey; Clay; W15; Singles and Doubles Draws	(Colombia) María Paulina Pérez (Italy) Federica Rossi; 2–6, 6–4, [10–6]	(Russia) Victoria Mikhaylova (Russia) Ekaterina Shalimova	(Russia) Polina Leykina (Japan) Shiho Akita	(Czech Republic) Darja Viďmanová (Slovenia) Živa Falkner (Belarus) Kristina Dmitruk (Austria) Tamira Paszek

=== May ===
Week of	Tournament	Winner	Runners-up	Semifinalists	Quarterfinalists
May 3	LTP Charleston Pro Tennis; Charleston, United States; Clay; W100; Singles Draw – Doubles Draw	(United States) Claire Liu; 6–2, 7–6^{(8–6)}	(United States) Madison Brengle	(Poland) Magdalena Fręch (United Kingdom) Harriet Dart	(United States) Katie Volynets (Mexico) Renata Zarazúa (United States) Jamie Loeb (Belarus) Olga Govortsova
May 3	LTP Charleston Pro Tennis; Charleston, United States; Clay; W100; Singles Draw – Doubles Draw	(United States) Caty McNally (Australia) Storm Sanders; 7–5, 4–6, [10–6]	(Japan) Eri Hozumi (Japan) Miyu Kato	(Poland) Magdalena Fręch (United Kingdom) Harriet Dart	(United States) Katie Volynets (Mexico) Renata Zarazúa (United States) Jamie Loeb (Belarus) Olga Govortsova
May 3	I.ČLTK Prague Open; Prague, Czech Republic; Clay; W25; Singles and Doubles Draws	(Germany) Jule Niemeier; 6–4, 6–2	(Hungary) Dalma Gálfi	(Romania) Elena-Gabriela Ruse (Chile) Daniela Seguel	(Croatia) Ana Konjuh (Turkey) Çağla Büyükakçay (Hungary) Anna Bondár (Hungary) Réka Luca Jani
May 3	I.ČLTK Prague Open; Prague, Czech Republic; Clay; W25; Singles and Doubles Draws	(Hungary) Anna Bondár (Belgium) Kimberley Zimmermann; 7–6^{(7–5)}, 6–2	(Switzerland) Xenia Knoll (Romania) Elena-Gabriela Ruse	(Romania) Elena-Gabriela Ruse (Chile) Daniela Seguel	(Croatia) Ana Konjuh (Turkey) Çağla Büyükakçay (Hungary) Anna Bondár (Hungary) Réka Luca Jani
May 3	Salinas, Ecuador; Hard; W25; Singles and Doubles Draws	(Japan) Mai Hontama; 7–5, 6–1	(Canada) Carol Zhao	(Russia) Valeria Savinykh (Switzerland) Conny Perrin	(Portugal) Francisca Jorge (Brazil) Laura Pigossi (Mexico) Victoria Rodríguez (Italy) Lucrezia Stefanini
May 3	Salinas, Ecuador; Hard; W25; Singles and Doubles Draws	(United Kingdom) Jodie Burrage (New Zealand) Paige Hourigan; 6–2, 2–6, [10–8]	(Sweden) Jacqueline Cabaj Awad (Portugal) Francisca Jorge	(Russia) Valeria Savinykh (Switzerland) Conny Perrin	(Portugal) Francisca Jorge (Brazil) Laura Pigossi (Mexico) Victoria Rodríguez (Italy) Lucrezia Stefanini
May 3	Naples, United States; Clay; W25; Singles and Doubles Draws	(Hungary) Panna Udvardy; 6–0, 6–3	(Romania) Irina Fetecău	(Mexico) Fernanda Contreras (Czech Republic) Jesika Malečková	(Belarus) Vera Lapko (Japan) Yuriko Lily Miyazaki (United States) Katerina Stewart (United States) Hanna Chang
May 3	Naples, United States; Clay; W25; Singles and Doubles Draws	(Norway) Ulrikke Eikeri (United States) Catherine Harrison; 6–2, 3–6, [10–2]	(Japan) Erina Hayashi (Japan) Kanako Morisaki	(Mexico) Fernanda Contreras (Czech Republic) Jesika Malečková	(Belarus) Vera Lapko (Japan) Yuriko Lily Miyazaki (United States) Katerina Stewart (United States) Hanna Chang
May 3	Cairo, Egypt; Clay; W15; Singles and Doubles Draws	(Bulgaria) Gergana Topalova; 6–3, 6–3	(Russia) Elina Avanesyan	(Czech Republic) Barbora Palicová (Russia) Anastasia Zolotareva	(Kazakhstan) Yekaterina Dmitrichenko (Kazakhstan) Zhibek Kulambayeva (Romania) Oana Gavrilă (Egypt) Sandra Samir
May 3	Cairo, Egypt; Clay; W15; Singles and Doubles Draws	(Romania) Oana Gavrilă (Kazakhstan) Zhibek Kulambayeva; 6–4, 6–0	(Egypt) Yasmin Ezzat (United States) Clervie Ngounoue	(Czech Republic) Barbora Palicová (Russia) Anastasia Zolotareva	(Kazakhstan) Yekaterina Dmitrichenko (Kazakhstan) Zhibek Kulambayeva (Romania) Oana Gavrilă (Egypt) Sandra Samir
May 3	Ramat HaSharon, Israel; Hard; W15; Singles and Doubles Draws	(Switzerland) Valentina Ryser; 7–5, 6–1	(Israel) Lina Glushko	(Israel) Shavit Kimchi (Belgium) Clara Vlasselaer	(Japan) Hiroko Kuwata (United Kingdom) Alicia Barnett (Australia) Alexandra Osborne (Russia) Ekaterina Yashina
May 3	Ramat HaSharon, Israel; Hard; W15; Singles and Doubles Draws	(Switzerland) Jenny Dürst (Switzerland) Nina Stadler; 1–6, 6–4, [10–6]	(Israel) Lina Glushko (Israel) Shavit Kimchi	(Israel) Shavit Kimchi (Belgium) Clara Vlasselaer	(Japan) Hiroko Kuwata (United Kingdom) Alicia Barnett (Australia) Alexandra Osborne (Russia) Ekaterina Yashina
May 3	Monastir, Tunisia; Hard; W15; Singles and Doubles Draws	(Italy) Angelica Raggi; 7–6^{(7–4)}, 6–4	(Finland) Anastasia Kulikova	(France) Mallaurie Noël (Japan) Miharu Imanishi	(Belarus) Anna Kubareva (United States) Dasha Ivanova (United States) Chiara Scholl (Japan) Ayumi Koshiishi
May 3	Monastir, Tunisia; Hard; W15; Singles and Doubles Draws	(Kazakhstan) Gozal Ainitdinova (Belarus) Anna Kubareva; 7–5, 6–2	(United Kingdom) Sarah Beth Grey (United States) Dasha Ivanova	(France) Mallaurie Noël (Japan) Miharu Imanishi	(Belarus) Anna Kubareva (United States) Dasha Ivanova (United States) Chiara Scholl (Japan) Ayumi Koshiishi
May 3	Antalya, Turkey; Clay; W15; Singles and Doubles Draws	(Russia) Polina Leykina; 6–1, 6–0	(Russia) Julia Avdeeva	(Romania) Andreea Roșca (Japan) Misaki Matsuda	(Russia) Ekaterina Shalimova (Australia) Olivia Gadecki (Sweden) Caijsa Hennemann (Turkey) İlay Yörük
May 3	Antalya, Turkey; Clay; W15; Singles and Doubles Draws	(Italy) Federica Bilardo (Belarus) Kristina Dmitruk; 6–3, 0–6, [10–7]	(United Kingdom) Matilda Mutavdzic (Croatia) Antonia Ružić	(Romania) Andreea Roșca (Japan) Misaki Matsuda	(Russia) Ekaterina Shalimova (Australia) Olivia Gadecki (Sweden) Caijsa Hennemann (Turkey) İlay Yörük
May 10	FineMark Women's Pro Tennis Championship; Bonita Springs, United States; Clay; W100; Singles Draw – Doubles Draw	(United States) Katie Volynets; 6–7^{(4–7)}, 7–6^{(7–2)}, 6–1	(Romania) Irina Bara	(United States) Hanna Chang (Romania) Irina Fetecău	(United States) Madison Brengle (United States) Francesca Di Lorenzo (Australia) Storm Sanders (Poland) Magdalena Fręch
May 10	FineMark Women's Pro Tennis Championship; Bonita Springs, United States; Clay; W100; Singles Draw – Doubles Draw	(New Zealand) Erin Routliffe (Indonesia) Aldila Sutjiadi; 6–3, 4–6, [10–6]	(Japan) Eri Hozumi (Japan) Miyu Kato	(United States) Hanna Chang (Romania) Irina Fetecău	(United States) Madison Brengle (United States) Francesca Di Lorenzo (Australia) Storm Sanders (Poland) Magdalena Fręch
May 10	Open Saint-Gaudens Occitanie; Saint-Gaudens, France; Clay; W60; Singles Draw – Doubles Draw	(France) Clara Burel; 6–2, 1–6, 6–2	(Romania) Alexandra Dulgheru	(Switzerland) Viktorija Golubic (Hungary) Anna Bondár	(Brazil) Beatriz Haddad Maia (Slovakia) Kristína Kučová (Japan) Kurumi Nara (Austria) Barbara Haas
May 10	Open Saint-Gaudens Occitanie; Saint-Gaudens, France; Clay; W60; Singles Draw – Doubles Draw	(France) Estelle Cascino (France) Jessika Ponchet; 0–6, 7–5, [10–7]	(United Kingdom) Eden Silva (Belgium) Kimberley Zimmermann	(Switzerland) Viktorija Golubic (Hungary) Anna Bondár	(Brazil) Beatriz Haddad Maia (Slovakia) Kristína Kučová (Japan) Kurumi Nara (Austria) Barbara Haas
May 10	Solgironès Open Catalunya; La Bisbal d'Empordà, Spain; Clay; W60+H; Singles Draw – Doubles Draw	(Russia) Irina Khromacheva; 6–4, 1–6, 7–6^{(10–8)}	(Netherlands) Arantxa Rus	(Croatia) Tereza Mrdeža (Serbia) Olga Danilović	(Spain) Marina Bassols Ribera (Georgia (country)) Ekaterine Gorgodze (Italy) Jessica Pieri (Belgium) Greet Minnen
May 10	Solgironès Open Catalunya; La Bisbal d'Empordà, Spain; Clay; W60+H; Singles Draw – Doubles Draw	(Russia) Valentina Ivakhnenko (Romania) Andreea Prisăcariu; 6–3, 6–1	(Germany) Mona Barthel (Luxembourg) Mandy Minella	(Croatia) Tereza Mrdeža (Serbia) Olga Danilović	(Spain) Marina Bassols Ribera (Georgia (country)) Ekaterine Gorgodze (Italy) Jessica Pieri (Belgium) Greet Minnen
May 10	Salinas, Ecuador; Hard; W25; Singles and Doubles Draws	(Italy) Lucrezia Stefanini; 6–1, 6–3	(Switzerland) Susan Bandecchi	(Switzerland) Conny Perrin (Russia) Maria Timofeeva	(Japan) Mai Hontama (New Zealand) Paige Hourigan (Mexico) Victoria Rodríguez (Brazil) Laura Pigossi
May 10	Salinas, Ecuador; Hard; W25; Singles and Doubles Draws	(United States) Rasheeda McAdoo (Switzerland) Conny Perrin; 6–4, 7–6^{(7–5)}	(Mexico) Victoria Rodríguez (Mexico) Ana Sofía Sánchez	(Switzerland) Conny Perrin (Russia) Maria Timofeeva	(Japan) Mai Hontama (New Zealand) Paige Hourigan (Mexico) Victoria Rodríguez (Brazil) Laura Pigossi
May 10	Jerusalem, Israel; Hard; W15; Singles and Doubles Draws	(Israel) Shavit Kimchi; 6–4, 6–3	(Russia) Ekaterina Yashina	(Israel) Lina Glushko (Switzerland) Valentina Ryser	(Switzerland) Jenny Dürst (Slovakia) Timea Jarušková (Belgium) Clara Vlasselaer (Israel) Nicole Khirin
May 10	Jerusalem, Israel; Hard; W15; Singles and Doubles Draws	(United Kingdom) Emily Appleton (United Kingdom) Alicia Barnett; 6–4, 2–6, [11–9]	(Switzerland) Jenny Dürst (Switzerland) Nina Stadler	(Israel) Lina Glushko (Switzerland) Valentina Ryser	(Switzerland) Jenny Dürst (Slovakia) Timea Jarušková (Belgium) Clara Vlasselaer (Israel) Nicole Khirin
May 10	Monastir, Tunisia; Hard; W15; Singles and Doubles Draws	(Belarus) Anna Kubareva; 6–1, 6–3	(Finland) Anastasia Kulikova	(Japan) Miharu Imanishi (Denmark) Olga Helmi	(Italy) Angelica Raggi (United Kingdom) Sarah Beth Grey (Japan) Erika Sema (Russia) Daria Lodikova
May 10	Monastir, Tunisia; Hard; W15; Singles and Doubles Draws	(United States) Lauren Proctor (United States) Anna Ulyashchenko; 4–6, 7–6^{(7–5)}, [10–7]	(Italy) Angelica Raggi (Japan) Erika Sema	(Japan) Miharu Imanishi (Denmark) Olga Helmi	(Italy) Angelica Raggi (United Kingdom) Sarah Beth Grey (Japan) Erika Sema (Russia) Daria Lodikova
May 10	Antalya, Turkey; Clay; W15; Singles and Doubles Draws	(Romania) Cristina Dinu; 6–3, 6–0	(Brazil) Gabriela Cé	(Italy) Aurora Zantedeschi (Russia) Polina Leykina	(Turkey) İlay Yörük (Slovakia) Romana Čisovská (Japan) Misaki Matsuda (Sweden) Fanny Östlund
May 10	Antalya, Turkey; Clay; W15; Singles and Doubles Draws	(Brazil) Gabriela Cé (Romania) Cristina Dinu; 7–5, 6–1	(Germany) Katharina Hering (Germany) Natalia Siedliska	(Italy) Aurora Zantedeschi (Russia) Polina Leykina	(Turkey) İlay Yörük (Slovakia) Romana Čisovská (Japan) Misaki Matsuda (Sweden) Fanny Östlund
May 17	Platja d'Aro, Spain; Clay; W25; Singles and Doubles Draws	(Spain) Rebeka Masarova; 6–3, 3–6, 6–2	(Spain) Irene Burillo Escorihuela	(France) Amandine Hesse (Germany) Stephanie Wagner	(France) Alice Ramé (Netherlands) Suzan Lamens (Spain) Marina Bassols Ribera (Spain) Carlota Martínez Círez
May 17	Platja d'Aro, Spain; Clay; W25; Singles and Doubles Draws	(Lithuania) Justina Mikulskytė (Romania) Oana Georgeta Simion; 6–3, 7–5	(Philippines) Alex Eala (Russia) Oksana Selekhmeteva	(France) Amandine Hesse (Germany) Stephanie Wagner	(France) Alice Ramé (Netherlands) Suzan Lamens (Spain) Marina Bassols Ribera (Spain) Carlota Martínez Círez
May 17	Pelham, United States; Clay; W25; Singles and Doubles Draws	(Hungary) Panna Udvardy; 6–7^{(5–7)}, 6–4, 6–3	(United States) Jamie Loeb	(United States) Sophie Chang (Georgia (country)) Sofia Shapatava	(Colombia) Emiliana Arango (United States) Elvina Kalieva (France) Marine Partaud (Netherlands) Arianne Hartono
May 17	Pelham, United States; Clay; W25; Singles and Doubles Draws	(Mexico) Fernanda Contreras (Mexico) Marcela Zacarías; 6–0, 6–3	(Japan) Erina Hayashi (Japan) Kanako Morisaki	(United States) Sophie Chang (Georgia (country)) Sofia Shapatava	(Colombia) Emiliana Arango (United States) Elvina Kalieva (France) Marine Partaud (Netherlands) Arianne Hartono
May 17	Šibenik, Croatia; Clay; W15; Singles and Doubles Draws	(Bosnia and Herzegovina) Dea Herdželaš; 6–2, 3–6, 6–4	(Czech Republic) Darja Viďmanová	(Czech Republic) Johana Marková (France) Léolia Jeanjean	(Croatia) Oleksandra Oliynykova (Croatia) Petra Marčinko (Croatia) Iva Primorac (Italy) Federica Rossi
May 17	Šibenik, Croatia; Clay; W15; Singles and Doubles Draws	(Croatia) Petra Marčinko (Hungary) Natália Szabanin; 6–4, 6–3	(Russia) Darya Astakhova (Russia) Ekaterina Makarova	(Czech Republic) Johana Marková (France) Léolia Jeanjean	(Croatia) Oleksandra Oliynykova (Croatia) Petra Marčinko (Croatia) Iva Primorac (Italy) Federica Rossi
May 17	Tbilisi, Georgia; Hard; W15; Singles and Doubles Draws	(Poland) Weronika Falkowska; 6–4, 6–3	(Russia) Valeriya Olyanovskaya	(Georgia (country)) Tamari Gagoshidze (United States) Zoe Howard	(United Kingdom) Emily Appleton (Switzerland) Joanne Züger (Russia) Ekaterina Yashina (Russia) Maria Sholokhova
May 17	Tbilisi, Georgia; Hard; W15; Singles and Doubles Draws	(Switzerland) Jenny Dürst (Poland) Weronika Falkowska; 6–3, 6–2	(Turkey) Ayla Aksu (Russia) Valeriya Olyanovskaya	(Georgia (country)) Tamari Gagoshidze (United States) Zoe Howard	(United Kingdom) Emily Appleton (Switzerland) Joanne Züger (Russia) Ekaterina Yashina (Russia) Maria Sholokhova
May 17	Heraklion, Greece; Clay; W15; Singles and Doubles Draws	(Germany) Lena Papadakis; 6–3, 6–3	(Austria) Melanie Klaffner	(Greece) Michaela Laki (Serbia) Tamara Malešević	(Germany) Eva Lys (Romania) Ioana Gașpar (Germany) Julia Kimmelmann (France) Maëlys Bougrat
May 17	Heraklion, Greece; Clay; W15; Singles and Doubles Draws	(Italy) Melania Delai (Hungary) Vanda Lukács; 6–2, 6–2	(Germany) Emily Seibold (Romania) Arina Vasilescu	(Greece) Michaela Laki (Serbia) Tamara Malešević	(Germany) Eva Lys (Romania) Ioana Gașpar (Germany) Julia Kimmelmann (France) Maëlys Bougrat
May 17	Monastir, Tunisia; Hard; W15; Singles and Doubles Draws	(Denmark) Olga Helmi; 6–3, 6–2	(Japan) Ayumi Koshiishi	(Japan) Sakura Hosogi (Switzerland) Nadine Keller	(France) Kélia Le Bihan (Italy) Angelica Raggi (Colombia) María Paulina Pérez (United States) Lauren Proctor
May 17	Monastir, Tunisia; Hard; W15; Singles and Doubles Draws	(United States) Emma Davis (United States) Anna Ulyashchenko; 7–6^{(7–5)}, 6–4	(France) Kélia Le Bihan (Belgium) Eliessa Vanlangendonck	(Japan) Sakura Hosogi (Switzerland) Nadine Keller	(France) Kélia Le Bihan (Italy) Angelica Raggi (Colombia) María Paulina Pérez (United States) Lauren Proctor
May 17	Antalya, Turkey; Clay; W15; Singles and Doubles Draws	(Romania) Cristina Dinu; 6–3, 6–4	(South Africa) Zoë Kruger	(Slovakia) Romana Čisovská (Sweden) Fanny Östlund	(Japan) Mayuka Aikawa (Italy) Aurora Zantedeschi (Greece) Sapfo Sakellaridi (Switzerland) Ylena In-Albon
May 17	Antalya, Turkey; Clay; W15; Singles and Doubles Draws	(Germany) Katharina Hobgarski (Switzerland) Ylena In-Albon; 6–3, 6–3	(Netherlands) Eva Vedder (Netherlands) Stéphanie Visscher	(Slovakia) Romana Čisovská (Sweden) Fanny Östlund	(Japan) Mayuka Aikawa (Italy) Aurora Zantedeschi (Greece) Sapfo Sakellaridi (Switzerland) Ylena In-Albon
May 24	Liepāja, Latvia; Clay; W25; Singles and Doubles Draws	(Latvia) Daniela Vismane; 6–4, 6–4	(Norway) Malene Helgø	(Germany) Anna Zaja (North Macedonia) Lina Gjorcheska	(Latvia) Kamilla Bartone (Turkey) İpek Öz (Italy) Federica Arcidiacono (Belarus) Iryna Shymanovich
May 24	Liepāja, Latvia; Clay; W25; Singles and Doubles Draws	(Uzbekistan) Akgul Amanmuradova (Russia) Valentina Ivakhnenko; 6–3, 3–6, [13–11]	(Greece) Valentini Grammatikopoulou (Belarus) Shalimar Talbi	(Germany) Anna Zaja (North Macedonia) Lina Gjorcheska	(Latvia) Kamilla Bartone (Turkey) İpek Öz (Italy) Federica Arcidiacono (Belarus) Iryna Shymanovich
May 24	Otočec, Slovenia; Clay; W25; Singles and Doubles Draws	(Czech Republic) Miriam Kolodziejová; 6–0, 6–2	(Slovenia) Dalila Jakupović	(Italy) Federica Di Sarra (Slovenia) Živa Falkner	(United States) Allie Kiick (Russia) Victoria Kan (Hungary) Anna Bondár (Romania) Ioana Loredana Roșca
May 24	Otočec, Slovenia; Clay; W25; Singles and Doubles Draws	(Italy) Federica Di Sarra (Italy) Camilla Rosatello; 6–4, 6–7^{(4–7)}, [10–4]	(Croatia) Lea Bošković (Cyprus) Raluca Șerban	(Italy) Federica Di Sarra (Slovenia) Živa Falkner	(United States) Allie Kiick (Russia) Victoria Kan (Hungary) Anna Bondár (Romania) Ioana Loredana Roșca
May 24	Šibenik, Croatia; Clay; W15; Singles and Doubles Draws	(France) Léolia Jeanjean; 6–2, 6–4	(Bosnia and Herzegovina) Nefisa Berberović	(Croatia) Petra Marčinko (Czech Republic) Darja Viďmanová	(Slovenia) Nina Potočnik (France) Lucie Wargnier (France) Émeline Dartron (Italy) Tatiana Pieri
May 24	Šibenik, Croatia; Clay; W15; Singles and Doubles Draws	(Croatia) Petra Marčinko (Hungary) Natália Szabanin; 6–4, 3–6, [10–4]	(Bosnia and Herzegovina) Nefisa Berberović (Italy) Nicole Fossa Huergo	(Croatia) Petra Marčinko (Czech Republic) Darja Viďmanová	(Slovenia) Nina Potočnik (France) Lucie Wargnier (France) Émeline Dartron (Italy) Tatiana Pieri
May 24	Heraklion, Greece; Clay; W15; Singles and Doubles Draws	(Romania) Ioana Gașpar; 6–0, 6–1	(Romania) Arina Vasilescu	(Russia) Darya Astakhova (Germany) Lena Papadakis	(Czech Republic) Anastasia Dețiuc (Italy) Melania Delai (Germany) Julia Kimmelmann (France) Margaux Rouvroy
May 24	Heraklion, Greece; Clay; W15; Singles and Doubles Draws	(Czech Republic) Anastasia Dețiuc (Netherlands) Lexie Stevens; 6–1, 4–6, [10–6]	(Russia) Darya Astakhova (Romania) Elena-Teodora Cadar	(Russia) Darya Astakhova (Germany) Lena Papadakis	(Czech Republic) Anastasia Dețiuc (Italy) Melania Delai (Germany) Julia Kimmelmann (France) Margaux Rouvroy
May 24	Shymkent, Kazakhstan; Clay; W15; Singles and Doubles Draws	(Kazakhstan) Zhibek Kulambayeva; 7–5, 6–0	(Belarus) Kristina Dmitruk	(Russia) Anna Ukolova (Serbia) Tamara Čurović	(Uzbekistan) Sabina Sharipova (Russia) Ekaterina Shalimova (Poland) Martyna Kubka (Kazakhstan) Yekaterina Dmitrichenko
May 24	Shymkent, Kazakhstan; Clay; W15; Singles and Doubles Draws	(Poland) Martyna Kubka (Kazakhstan) Zhibek Kulambayeva; 7–6^{(7–3)}, 5–7, [10–8]	(Russia) Ekaterina Reyngold (Russia) Ekaterina Shalimova	(Russia) Anna Ukolova (Serbia) Tamara Čurović	(Uzbekistan) Sabina Sharipova (Russia) Ekaterina Shalimova (Poland) Martyna Kubka (Kazakhstan) Yekaterina Dmitrichenko
May 24	Santa Margarida de Montbui, Spain; Hard; W15; Singles and Doubles Draws	(Lithuania) Justina Mikulskytė; 6–2, 6–0	(Spain) Celia Cerviño Ruiz	(Russia) Oksana Selekhmeteva (Argentina) Solana Sierra	(United Kingdom) Amanda Carreras (Serbia) Mihaela Đaković (Spain) Jéssica Bouzas Maneiro (Spain) Yvonne Cavallé Reimers
May 24	Santa Margarida de Montbui, Spain; Hard; W15; Singles and Doubles Draws	(Argentina) Victoria Bosio (Lithuania) Justina Mikulskytė; 4–6, 6–1, [10–7]	(Spain) Celia Cerviño Ruiz (United Kingdom) Olivia Nicholls	(Russia) Oksana Selekhmeteva (Argentina) Solana Sierra	(United Kingdom) Amanda Carreras (Serbia) Mihaela Đaković (Spain) Jéssica Bouzas Maneiro (Spain) Yvonne Cavallé Reimers
May 24	Monastir, Tunisia; Hard; W15; Singles and Doubles Draws	(Japan) Himeno Sakatsume; 6–4, 7–5	(Japan) Sakura Hosogi	(France) Alice Robbe (Poland) Joanna Zawadzka	(Japan) Haruna Arakawa (United States) Emma Davis (United States) Lauren Proctor (Japan) Miharu Imanishi
May 24	Monastir, Tunisia; Hard; W15; Singles and Doubles Draws	(United States) Dalayna Hewitt (United States) Chiara Scholl; 6–4, 6–2	(United States) Emma Davis (Colombia) María Paulina Pérez	(France) Alice Robbe (Poland) Joanna Zawadzka	(Japan) Haruna Arakawa (United States) Emma Davis (United States) Lauren Proctor (Japan) Miharu Imanishi
May 24	Antalya, Turkey; Clay; W15; Singles and Doubles Draws	(Switzerland) Ylena In-Albon; 6–3, 6–2	(Germany) Luisa Meyer auf der Heide	(Turkey) İlay Yörük (United States) Hurricane Tyra Black	(Russia) Daria Zelinskaya (Greece) Sapfo Sakellaridi (South Africa) Isabella Kruger (Sweden) Caijsa Hennemann
May 24	Antalya, Turkey; Clay; W15; Singles and Doubles Draws	(Switzerland) Fiona Ganz (South Korea) Kim Da-bin; 7–5, 6–0	(Turkey) Doğa Türkmen (Turkey) Melis Uyar	(Turkey) İlay Yörük (United States) Hurricane Tyra Black	(Russia) Daria Zelinskaya (Greece) Sapfo Sakellaridi (South Africa) Isabella Kruger (Sweden) Caijsa Hennemann
May 31	Santo Domingo, Dominican Republic; Hard; W25; Singles and Doubles Draws	(Argentina) María Lourdes Carlé; 6–4, 6–0	(Switzerland) Conny Perrin	(United States) Charlotte Chavatipon (Venezuela) Andrea Gámiz	(United States) Jessica Failla (Mexico) Fernanda Contreras (Russia) Maria Timofeeva (Spain) Marina Bassols Ribera
May 31	Santo Domingo, Dominican Republic; Hard; W25; Singles and Doubles Draws	(Japan) Erina Hayashi (Japan) Kanako Morisaki; 6–7^{(3–7)}, 6–1, [10–7]	(United States) Emina Bektas (United States) Quinn Gleason	(United States) Charlotte Chavatipon (Venezuela) Andrea Gámiz	(United States) Jessica Failla (Mexico) Fernanda Contreras (Russia) Maria Timofeeva (Spain) Marina Bassols Ribera
May 31	Grado, Italy; Clay; W25; Singles and Doubles Draws	(Spain) Nuria Párrizas Díaz; 6–3, 5–7, 6–2	(Italy) Nuria Brancaccio	(Italy) Federica Di Sarra (Turkey) Çağla Büyükakçay	(Russia) Liudmila Samsonova (Spain) Irene Burillo Escorihuela (Switzerland) Susan Bandecchi (Italy) Lucia Bronzetti
May 31	Grado, Italy; Clay; W25; Singles and Doubles Draws	(Italy) Lucia Bronzetti (Bulgaria) Isabella Shinikova; 6–4, 2–6, [10–8]	(Italy) Federica Di Sarra (Italy) Camilla Rosatello	(Italy) Federica Di Sarra (Turkey) Çağla Büyükakçay	(Russia) Liudmila Samsonova (Spain) Irene Burillo Escorihuela (Switzerland) Susan Bandecchi (Italy) Lucia Bronzetti
May 31	Tatarstan Open; Kazan, Russia; Hard; W25; Singles and Doubles Draws	(Belarus) Anna Kubareva; 6–1, 6–3	(Greece) Valentini Grammatikopoulou	(Russia) Valeria Savinykh (Russia) Vlada Koval	(Belarus) Anhelina Kalita (Russia) Ekaterina Makarova (Russia) Alina Charaeva (Belarus) Iryna Shymanovich
May 31	Tatarstan Open; Kazan, Russia; Hard; W25; Singles and Doubles Draws	(Uzbekistan) Nigina Abduraimova (Russia) Angelina Gabueva; 6–2, 7–6^{(7–5)}	(Belarus) Iryna Shymanovich (Belarus) Shalimar Talbi	(Russia) Valeria Savinykh (Russia) Vlada Koval	(Belarus) Anhelina Kalita (Russia) Ekaterina Makarova (Russia) Alina Charaeva (Belarus) Iryna Shymanovich
May 31	Otočec, Slovenia; Clay; W25; Singles and Doubles Draws	(Belgium) Maryna Zanevska; 7–6^{(7–4)}, 6–0	(Croatia) Lea Bošković	(Croatia) Iva Primorac (Romania) Alexandra Cadanțu	(Germany) Katharina Gerlach (Hungary) Anna Bondár (Slovakia) Rebecca Šramková (France) Léolia Jeanjean
May 31	Otočec, Slovenia; Clay; W25; Singles and Doubles Draws	(Norway) Ulrikke Eikeri (Hungary) Réka Luca Jani; 5–7, 6–4, [10–5]	(Slovenia) Pia Lovrič (Burundi) Sada Nahimana	(Croatia) Iva Primorac (Romania) Alexandra Cadanțu	(Germany) Katharina Gerlach (Hungary) Anna Bondár (Slovakia) Rebecca Šramková (France) Léolia Jeanjean
May 31	Banja Luka, Bosnia and Herzegovina; Clay; W15; Singles and Doubles Draws	(Germany) Anna Gabric; 4–6, 6–3, 4–1, ret.	(Slovakia) Romana Čisovská	(Slovakia) Eszter Méri (Slovakia) Tereza Mihalíková	(Italy) Nicole Fossa Huergo (Hungary) Dorka Drahota-Szabó (Switzerland) Lulu Sun (Slovakia) Anika Jašková
May 31	Banja Luka, Bosnia and Herzegovina; Clay; W15; Singles and Doubles Draws	(Italy) Nicole Fossa Huergo (Serbia) Bojana Marinković; 6–2, 3–6, [10–8]	(Slovakia) Katarína Kužmová (Serbia) Elena Milovanović	(Slovakia) Eszter Méri (Slovakia) Tereza Mihalíková	(Italy) Nicole Fossa Huergo (Hungary) Dorka Drahota-Szabó (Switzerland) Lulu Sun (Slovakia) Anika Jašková
May 31	Heraklion, Greece; Clay; W15; Singles and Doubles Draws	(Russia) Darya Astakhova; 6–3, 6–2	(Czech Republic) Michaela Bayerlová	(Mexico) María José Portillo Ramírez (Romania) Ioana Gașpar	(Czech Republic) Anastasia Dețiuc (Switzerland) Lara Michel (Australia) Tina Nadine Smith (Italy) Martina Colmegna
May 31	Heraklion, Greece; Clay; W15; Singles and Doubles Draws	(Germany) Julia Kimmelmann (United Kingdom) Anna Popescu; 6–2, 6–4	(Poland) Weronika Falkowska (Romania) Ioana Gașpar	(Mexico) María José Portillo Ramírez (Romania) Ioana Gașpar	(Czech Republic) Anastasia Dețiuc (Switzerland) Lara Michel (Australia) Tina Nadine Smith (Italy) Martina Colmegna
May 31	Shymkent, Kazakhstan; Clay; W15; Singles and Doubles Draws	(Ukraine) Anastasiya Soboleva; 6–4, 7–6^{(7–4)}	(Russia) Valeriya Olyanovskaya	(Georgia (country)) Mariam Dalakishvili (Kazakhstan) Zhibek Kulambayeva	(Serbia) Tamara Čurović (Kazakhstan) Yekaterina Dmitrichenko (Russia) Alina Silich (Russia) Anna Ukolova
May 31	Shymkent, Kazakhstan; Clay; W15; Singles and Doubles Draws	(Poland) Martyna Kubka (Kazakhstan) Zhibek Kulambayeva; 6–4, 6–4	(Russia) Ekaterina Reyngold (Russia) Ekaterina Shalimova	(Georgia (country)) Mariam Dalakishvili (Kazakhstan) Zhibek Kulambayeva	(Serbia) Tamara Čurović (Kazakhstan) Yekaterina Dmitrichenko (Russia) Alina Silich (Russia) Anna Ukolova
May 31	Monastir, Tunisia; Hard; W15; Singles and Doubles Draws	(Japan) Himeno Sakatsume; 7–5, 7–5	(Japan) Sakura Hosogi	(Japan) Haruna Arakawa (Ecuador) Mell Reasco	(United States) Lauren Proctor (Japan) Miharu Imanishi (Egypt) Lamis Alhussein Abdel Aziz (France) Nahia Berecoechea
May 31	Monastir, Tunisia; Hard; W15; Singles and Doubles Draws	(Japan) Sakura Hosogi (Japan) Himeno Sakatsume; 7–5, 2–6, [10–8]	(United States) Emma Davis (United States) Lauren Proctor	(Japan) Haruna Arakawa (Ecuador) Mell Reasco	(United States) Lauren Proctor (Japan) Miharu Imanishi (Egypt) Lamis Alhussein Abdel Aziz (France) Nahia Berecoechea
May 31	Antalya, Turkey; Clay; W15; Singles and Doubles Draws	(United States) Hurricane Tyra Black; 2–6, 6–4, 6–4	(Italy) Federica Bilardo	(France) Manon Arcangioli (Romania) Oana Gavrilă	(Czech Republic) Sára Bejlek (Germany) Natalia Siedliska (United States) Rachel Gailis (Greece) Sapfo Sakellaridi
May 31	Antalya, Turkey; Clay; W15; Singles and Doubles Draws	(Czech Republic) Sára Bejlek (Turkey) Doğa Türkmen; 4–6, 6–1, [10–7]	(Italy) Federica Bilardo (Ukraine) Liubov Kostenko	(France) Manon Arcangioli (Romania) Oana Gavrilă	(Czech Republic) Sára Bejlek (Germany) Natalia Siedliska (United States) Rachel Gailis (Greece) Sapfo Sakellaridi

=== June ===
Week of	Tournament	Winner	Runners-up	Semifinalists	Quarterfinalists
June 7	Santo Domingo, Dominican Republic; Hard; W25; Singles and Doubles Draws	(Mexico) Ana Sofía Sánchez; 3–6, 7–6^{(7–3)}, 7–6^{(11–9)}	(United States) Emina Bektas	(United States) Sachia Vickery (Spain) Andrea Lázaro García	(Brazil) Carolina Alves (Argentina) María Lourdes Carlé (Italy) Lucrezia Stefanini (Spain) Marina Bassols Ribera
June 7	Santo Domingo, Dominican Republic; Hard; W25; Singles and Doubles Draws	(United States) Emina Bektas (United States) Quinn Gleason; 7–5, 6–4	(Dominican Republic) Kelly Williford (Dominican Republic) Ana Carmen Zamburek	(United States) Sachia Vickery (Spain) Andrea Lázaro García	(Brazil) Carolina Alves (Argentina) María Lourdes Carlé (Italy) Lucrezia Stefanini (Spain) Marina Bassols Ribera
June 7	Montemor-o-Novo, Portugal; Hard; W25; Singles and Doubles Draws	(Brazil) Beatriz Haddad Maia; 6–4, 6–4	(Georgia (country)) Mariam Bolkvadze	(Japan) Mai Hontama (Portugal) Francisca Jorge	(France) Jessika Ponchet (Japan) Yuriko Lily Miyazaki (Japan) Eri Hozumi (Greece) Valentini Grammatikopoulou
June 7	Montemor-o-Novo, Portugal; Hard; W25; Singles and Doubles Draws	(Norway) Ulrikke Eikeri (Greece) Valentini Grammatikopoulou; 6–1, 6–0	(Japan) Eri Hozumi (Japan) Akiko Omae	(Japan) Mai Hontama (Portugal) Francisca Jorge	(France) Jessika Ponchet (Japan) Yuriko Lily Miyazaki (Japan) Eri Hozumi (Greece) Valentini Grammatikopoulou
June 7	Madrid, Spain; Hard; W25; Singles and Doubles Draws	(United States) Robin Anderson; 6–3, 6–7^{(3–7)}, 7–6^{(10–8)}	(Australia) Olivia Gadecki	(Italy) Jessica Pieri (Finland) Anastasia Kulikova	(Spain) Rebeka Masarova (Bulgaria) Elitsa Kostova (France) Amandine Hesse (South Korea) Han Na-lae
June 7	Madrid, Spain; Hard; W25; Singles and Doubles Draws	(Australia) Destanee Aiava (Australia) Olivia Gadecki; 6–3, 6–3	(Japan) Mana Ayukawa (South Korea) Han Na-lae	(Italy) Jessica Pieri (Finland) Anastasia Kulikova	(Spain) Rebeka Masarova (Bulgaria) Elitsa Kostova (France) Amandine Hesse (South Korea) Han Na-lae
June 7	Heraklion, Greece; Clay; W15; Singles and Doubles Draws	(Spain) Jéssica Bouzas Maneiro; 6–3, 6–0	(Mexico) María José Portillo Ramírez	(Czech Republic) Michaela Bayerlová (Israel) Shavit Kimchi	(Italy) Martina Colmegna (Spain) Claudia Hoste Ferrer (United States) Jessie Aney (Germany) Emily Seibold
June 7	Heraklion, Greece; Clay; W15; Singles and Doubles Draws	(United States) Jessie Aney (Czech Republic) Michaela Bayerlová; 6–4, 6–4	(Israel) Nicole Khirin (Israel) Shavit Kimchi	(Czech Republic) Michaela Bayerlová (Israel) Shavit Kimchi	(Italy) Martina Colmegna (Spain) Claudia Hoste Ferrer (United States) Jessie Aney (Germany) Emily Seibold
June 7	Vilnius, Lithuania; Hard (indoor); W15; Singles and Doubles Draws	(Bosnia and Herzegovina) Dea Herdželaš; 6–2, 4–0, ret.	(Russia) Anzhelika Isaeva	(Lithuania) Iveta Dapkutė (Latvia) Patrīcija Špaka	(Turkey) Ayla Aksu (United States) Zoe Howard (Lithuania) Akvilė Paražinskaitė (Germany) Emily Welker
June 7	Vilnius, Lithuania; Hard (indoor); W15; Singles and Doubles Draws	(Russia) Ekaterina Makarova (Russia) Anna Morgina; 6–2, 3–6, [10–2]	(Lithuania) Justina Mikulskytė (Lithuania) Akvilė Paražinskaitė	(Lithuania) Iveta Dapkutė (Latvia) Patrīcija Špaka	(Turkey) Ayla Aksu (United States) Zoe Howard (Lithuania) Akvilė Paražinskaitė (Germany) Emily Welker
June 7	Monastir, Tunisia; Hard; W15; Singles and Doubles Draws	(Japan) Miharu Imanishi; 6–0, 6–4	(United States) Jenna DeFalco	(France) Alice Robbe (Egypt) Lamis Alhussein Abdel Aziz	(France) Emma Léné (Turkey) Zeynep Sönmez (United States) Dalayna Hewitt (Spain) Ana Lantigua de la Nuez
June 7	Monastir, Tunisia; Hard; W15; Singles and Doubles Draws	(Japan) Miharu Imanishi (Japan) Haine Ogata; 7–5, 7–6^{(7–0)}	(United States) Dalayna Hewitt (United States) Kariann Pierre-Louis	(France) Alice Robbe (Egypt) Lamis Alhussein Abdel Aziz	(France) Emma Léné (Turkey) Zeynep Sönmez (United States) Dalayna Hewitt (Spain) Ana Lantigua de la Nuez
June 7	Antalya, Turkey; Clay; W15; Singles and Doubles Draws	(Hungary) Vanda Lukács; 6–0, 5–7, 6–3	(Turkey) İlay Yörük	(Netherlands) Eva Vedder (Colombia) María Herazo González	(Italy) Federica Bilardo (Romania) Oana Gavrilă (Bulgaria) Dia Evtimova (Czech Republic) Sára Bejlek
June 7	Antalya, Turkey; Clay; W15; Singles and Doubles Draws	(Italy) Federica Bilardo (United States) Taylor Ng; 6–0, 6–3	(United States) Rachel Gailis (United States) Jamilah Snells	(Netherlands) Eva Vedder (Colombia) María Herazo González	(Italy) Federica Bilardo (Romania) Oana Gavrilă (Bulgaria) Dia Evtimova (Czech Republic) Sára Bejlek
June 14	Nottingham Trophy; Nottingham, United Kingdom; Grass; W100+H; Singles Draw – Doubles Draw	(Belgium) Alison Van Uytvanck; 6–0, 6–4	(Australia) Arina Rodionova	(Mexico) Renata Zarazúa (Bulgaria) Tsvetana Pironkova	(Belgium) Greet Minnen (China) Wang Xinyu (China) Wang Xiyu (United Kingdom) Emma Raducanu
June 14	Nottingham Trophy; Nottingham, United Kingdom; Grass; W100+H; Singles Draw – Doubles Draw	(Romania) Monica Niculescu (Romania) Elena-Gabriela Ruse; 7–5, 7–5	(Australia) Priscilla Hon (Australia) Storm Sanders	(Mexico) Renata Zarazúa (Bulgaria) Tsvetana Pironkova	(Belgium) Greet Minnen (China) Wang Xinyu (China) Wang Xiyu (United Kingdom) Emma Raducanu
June 14	Macha Lake Open; Staré Splavy, Czech Republic; Clay; W60; Singles Draw – Doubles Draw	(China) Zheng Qinwen; 7–6^{(7–5)}, 6–3	(Serbia) Aleksandra Krunić	(Czech Republic) Linda Nosková (Romania) Alexandra Cadanțu	(Croatia) Tereza Mrdeža (Spain) Irene Burillo Escorihuela (Hungary) Réka Luca Jani (Romania) Alexandra Dulgheru
June 14	Macha Lake Open; Staré Splavy, Czech Republic; Clay; W60; Singles Draw – Doubles Draw	(Greece) Valentini Grammatikopoulou (Netherlands) Richèl Hogenkamp; 6–3, 6–4	(Russia) Amina Anshba (Czech Republic) Anastasia Dețiuc	(Czech Republic) Linda Nosková (Romania) Alexandra Cadanțu	(Croatia) Tereza Mrdeža (Spain) Irene Burillo Escorihuela (Hungary) Réka Luca Jani (Romania) Alexandra Dulgheru
June 14	Open Porte du Hainaut; Denain, France; Clay; W25; Singles and Doubles Draws	(Hungary) Dalma Gálfi; 5–7, 6–2, 6–4	(Argentina) Paula Ormaechea	(Switzerland) Ylena In-Albon (France) Chloé Paquet	(France) Séléna Janicijevic (France) Alice Ramé (China) Yuan Yue (France) Margaux Rouvroy
June 14	Open Porte du Hainaut; Denain, France; Clay; W25; Singles and Doubles Draws	(Kazakhstan) Anna Danilina (Ukraine) Valeriya Strakhova; 7–5, 3–6, [10–4]	(Hungary) Dalma Gálfi (Argentina) Paula Ormaechea	(Switzerland) Ylena In-Albon (France) Chloé Paquet	(France) Séléna Janicijevic (France) Alice Ramé (China) Yuan Yue (France) Margaux Rouvroy
June 14	Figueira da Foz, Portugal; Hard; W25+H; Singles and Doubles Draws	(France) Tessah Andrianjafitrimo; 6–7^{(3–7)}, 6–1, 6–0	(France) Jessika Ponchet	(Japan) Eri Hozumi (Spain) María Gutiérrez Carrasco	(Netherlands) Arianne Hartono (Germany) Katharina Hobgarski (Japan) Mai Hontama (Japan) Yuriko Lily Miyazaki
June 14	Figueira da Foz, Portugal; Hard; W25+H; Singles and Doubles Draws	(United Kingdom) Alicia Barnett (United Kingdom) Olivia Nicholls; 6–3, 7–6^{(7–3)}	(Turkey) Berfu Cengiz (Russia) Anastasia Tikhonova	(Japan) Eri Hozumi (Spain) María Gutiérrez Carrasco	(Netherlands) Arianne Hartono (Germany) Katharina Hobgarski (Japan) Mai Hontama (Japan) Yuriko Lily Miyazaki
June 14	Madrid, Spain; Hard; W25; Singles and Doubles Draws	(France) Amandine Hesse; 6–4, 7–5	(Spain) Jéssica Bouzas Maneiro	(Spain) Andrea Lázaro García (Spain) Rebeka Masarova	(Russia) Ekaterina Yashina (South Korea) Han Na-lae (Japan) Himari Sato (Norway) Melanie Stokke
June 14	Madrid, Spain; Hard; W25; Singles and Doubles Draws	(United States) Ashley Lahey (Australia) Olivia Tjandramulia; 6–2, 4–6, [10–8]	(Spain) Yvonne Cavallé Reimers (Spain) Celia Cerviño Ruiz	(Spain) Andrea Lázaro García (Spain) Rebeka Masarova	(Russia) Ekaterina Yashina (South Korea) Han Na-lae (Japan) Himari Sato (Norway) Melanie Stokke
June 14	Jönköping, Sweden; Clay; W25; Singles and Doubles Draws	(Russia) Darya Astakhova; 3–6, 6–3, 7–5	(Italy) Lucia Bronzetti	(Italy) Cristiana Ferrando (Italy) Camilla Rosatello	(Sweden) Fanny Östlund (Sweden) Caijsa Hennemann (France) Carole Monnet (Canada) Carol Zhao
June 14	Jönköping, Sweden; Clay; W25; Singles and Doubles Draws	(Italy) Cristiana Ferrando (Romania) Oana Georgeta Simion; 7–5, 6–4	(Sweden) Jacqueline Cabaj Awad (France) Carole Monnet	(Italy) Cristiana Ferrando (Italy) Camilla Rosatello	(Sweden) Fanny Östlund (Sweden) Caijsa Hennemann (France) Carole Monnet (Canada) Carol Zhao
June 14	Sumter, United States; Clay; W25; Singles and Doubles Draws	(United States) Peyton Stearns; 6–1, 6–2	(Mexico) Fernanda Contreras	(Mexico) Marcela Zacarías (United States) Alycia Parks	(United States) Victoria Duval (Mexico) Ana Sofía Sánchez (Hungary) Fanny Stollár (New Zealand) Paige Hourigan
June 14	Sumter, United States; Clay; W25; Singles and Doubles Draws	(United States) Emina Bektas (United States) Catherine Harrison; 7–5, 6–4	(New Zealand) Paige Hourigan (Indonesia) Aldila Sutjiadi	(Mexico) Marcela Zacarías (United States) Alycia Parks	(United States) Victoria Duval (Mexico) Ana Sofía Sánchez (Hungary) Fanny Stollár (New Zealand) Paige Hourigan
June 14	Monastir, Tunisia; Hard; W15; Singles and Doubles Draws	(Ecuador) Mell Reasco; 7–6^{(9–7)}, 3–6, 6–4	(Serbia) Katarina Kozarov	(United States) Jenna DeFalco (United Kingdom) Emilie Lindh	(France) Jade Bornay (Germany) Kathleen Kanev (Japan) Michika Ozeki (Kazakhstan) Gozal Ainitdinova
June 14	Monastir, Tunisia; Hard; W15; Singles and Doubles Draws	(France) Sophia Biolay (France) Emmanuelle Girard; 6–2, 6–1	(Poland) Aleksandra Wierzbowska (Poland) Joanna Zawadzka	(United States) Jenna DeFalco (United Kingdom) Emilie Lindh	(France) Jade Bornay (Germany) Kathleen Kanev (Japan) Michika Ozeki (Kazakhstan) Gozal Ainitdinova
June 14	Antalya, Turkey; Clay; W15; Singles and Doubles Draws	(Romania) Ilona Georgiana Ghioroaie; 7–5, 6–2	(Italy) Federica Bilardo	(United States) Jessie Aney (Spain) Rosa Vicens Mas	(Bulgaria) Dia Evtimova (United States) Hurricane Tyra Black (Colombia) María Herazo González (Hungary) Vanda Lukács
June 14	Antalya, Turkey; Clay; W15; Singles and Doubles Draws	(United States) Jessie Aney (United States) Christina Rosca; 6–1, 6–0	(Italy) Costanza Traversi (Romania) Andreea Velcea	(United States) Jessie Aney (Spain) Rosa Vicens Mas	(Bulgaria) Dia Evtimova (United States) Hurricane Tyra Black (Colombia) María Herazo González (Hungary) Vanda Lukács
June 21	LTP Charleston Pro Tennis II; Charleston, United States; Clay; W60; Singles Draw – Doubles Draw	(Greece) Despina Papamichail; 1–6, 6–3, 6–3	(Brazil) Gabriela Cé	(Georgia (country)) Sofia Shapatava (Mexico) Fernanda Contreras	(United States) Sophie Chang (Mexico) Ana Sofía Sánchez (United States) Emma Navarro (United States) Alexa Glatch
June 21	LTP Charleston Pro Tennis II; Charleston, United States; Clay; W60; Singles Draw – Doubles Draw	(Hungary) Fanny Stollár (Indonesia) Aldila Sutjiadi; 6–0, 6–4	(United States) Rasheeda McAdoo (United States) Peyton Stearns	(Georgia (country)) Sofia Shapatava (Mexico) Fernanda Contreras	(United States) Sophie Chang (Mexico) Ana Sofía Sánchez (United States) Emma Navarro (United States) Alexa Glatch
June 21	Périgueux, France; Clay; W25; Singles and Doubles Draws	(France) Diane Parry; 6–3, 6–1	(France) Elsa Jacquemot	(France) Carole Monnet (Italy) Lucia Bronzetti	(France) Sara Cakarevic (Argentina) Paula Ormaechea (Czech Republic) Anna Sisková (France) Salma Djoubri
June 21	Périgueux, France; Clay; W25; Singles and Doubles Draws	(France) Diane Parry (France) Margot Yerolymos; 6–4, 6–2	(Burundi) Sada Nahimana (Czech Republic) Anna Sisková	(France) Carole Monnet (Italy) Lucia Bronzetti	(France) Sara Cakarevic (Argentina) Paula Ormaechea (Czech Republic) Anna Sisková (France) Salma Djoubri
June 21	Porto, Portugal; Hard; W25; Singles and Doubles Draws	(Japan) Mai Hontama; 6–4, 6–3	(Russia) Anastasia Tikhonova	(Netherlands) Arianne Hartono (France) Tessah Andrianjafitrimo	(Spain) Marina Bassols Ribera (Denmark) Olga Helmi (Portugal) Matilde Jorge (Spain) María Gutiérrez Carrasco
June 21	Porto, Portugal; Hard; W25; Singles and Doubles Draws	(Netherlands) Arianne Hartono (Japan) Yuriko Lily Miyazaki; 7–5, 6–2	(Japan) Mana Ayukawa (Japan) Akiko Omae	(Netherlands) Arianne Hartono (France) Tessah Andrianjafitrimo	(Spain) Marina Bassols Ribera (Denmark) Olga Helmi (Portugal) Matilde Jorge (Spain) María Gutiérrez Carrasco
June 21	Klosters, Switzerland; Clay; W25; Singles and Doubles Draws	(Switzerland) Ylena In-Albon; 6–3, 6–2	(Romania) Andreea Prisăcariu	(Latvia) Diāna Marcinkēviča (Bosnia and Herzegovina) Dea Herdželaš	(Germany) Sina Herrmann (Czech Republic) Jesika Malečková (Switzerland) Jenny Dürst (Germany) Lena Papadakis
June 21	Klosters, Switzerland; Clay; W25; Singles and Doubles Draws	(Russia) Amina Anshba (Czech Republic) Anastasia Dețiuc; 3–6, 6–1, [10–3]	(Switzerland) Jenny Dürst (Poland) Weronika Falkowska	(Latvia) Diāna Marcinkēviča (Bosnia and Herzegovina) Dea Herdželaš	(Germany) Sina Herrmann (Czech Republic) Jesika Malečková (Switzerland) Jenny Dürst (Germany) Lena Papadakis
June 21	L'Aquila, Italy; Clay; W15; Singles and Doubles Draws	(Italy) Tatiana Pieri; 2–6, 6–3, 7–5	(Germany) Anne Schäfer	(United States) Hina Inoue (Italy) Anastasia Grymalska	(Germany) Emily Seibold (Italy) Federica Arcidiacono (Italy) Chiara Catini (Italy) Martina Spigarelli
June 21	L'Aquila, Italy; Clay; W15; Singles and Doubles Draws	(Serbia) Tamara Čurović (Germany) Natalia Siedliska; 6–2, 6–3	(Czech Republic) Michaela Bayerlová (Germany) Emily Seibold	(United States) Hina Inoue (Italy) Anastasia Grymalska	(Germany) Emily Seibold (Italy) Federica Arcidiacono (Italy) Chiara Catini (Italy) Martina Spigarelli
June 21	Alkmaar, Netherlands; Clay; W15; Singles and Doubles Draws	(Netherlands) Quirine Lemoine; 7–6^{(8–6)}, 6–1	(Russia) Julia Avdeeva	(Hungary) Natália Szabanin (United States) Chiara Scholl	(United States) Nikki Redelijk (Chinese Taipei) Joanna Garland (Russia) Ekaterina Makarova (Czech Republic) Denisa Hindová
June 21	Alkmaar, Netherlands; Clay; W15; Singles and Doubles Draws	(Netherlands) Quirine Lemoine (Netherlands) Gabriella Mujan; 6–4, 6–1	(Netherlands) Eva Vedder (Netherlands) Stéphanie Visscher	(Hungary) Natália Szabanin (United States) Chiara Scholl	(United States) Nikki Redelijk (Chinese Taipei) Joanna Garland (Russia) Ekaterina Makarova (Czech Republic) Denisa Hindová
June 21	Monastir, Tunisia; Hard; W15; Singles and Doubles Draws	(Zimbabwe) Valeria Bhunu; 6–2, 6–2	(Japan) Saki Imamura	(Croatia) Mariana Dražić (Japan) Yui Chikaraishi	(Japan) Mao Mushika (Switzerland) Nicole Gadient (Japan) Mio Mushika (Lithuania) Andrė Lukošiūtė
June 21	Monastir, Tunisia; Hard; W15; Singles and Doubles Draws	(Croatia) Mariana Dražić (Uzbekistan) Sabina Sharipova; 6–7^{(1–7)}, 6–4, [10–0]	(Japan) Saki Imamura (South Korea) Shin Ji-ho	(Croatia) Mariana Dražić (Japan) Yui Chikaraishi	(Japan) Mao Mushika (Switzerland) Nicole Gadient (Japan) Mio Mushika (Lithuania) Andrė Lukošiūtė
June 21	Antalya, Turkey; Clay; W15; Singles and Doubles Draws	(Spain) Rosa Vicens Mas; 6–1, 6–2	(Colombia) María Herazo González	(Greece) Sapfo Sakellaridi (Hungary) Vanda Lukács	(Spain) Leyre Romero Gormaz (Bulgaria) Julia Stamatova (United States) Hurricane Tyra Black (Romania) Ilona Georgiana Ghioroaie
June 21	Antalya, Turkey; Clay; W15; Singles and Doubles Draws	(Turkey) Başak Eraydın (Hungary) Amarissa Kiara Tóth; 4–6, 6–1, [10–7]	(United States) Jessie Aney (United States) Christina Rosca	(Greece) Sapfo Sakellaridi (Hungary) Vanda Lukács	(Spain) Leyre Romero Gormaz (Bulgaria) Julia Stamatova (United States) Hurricane Tyra Black (Romania) Ilona Georgiana Ghioroaie
June 28	Open Montpellier Méditerranée Métropole Hérault; Montpellier, France; Clay; W60; Singles Draw – Doubles Draw	(Ukraine) Anhelina Kalinina; 6–2, 6–3	(Egypt) Mayar Sherif	(China) Zheng Qinwen (Spain) Cristina Bucșa	(France) Océane Dodin (Italy) Martina Di Giuseppe (Burundi) Sada Nahimana (Russia) Oksana Selekhmeteva
June 28	Open Montpellier Méditerranée Métropole Hérault; Montpellier, France; Clay; W60; Singles Draw – Doubles Draw	(France) Estelle Cascino (Italy) Camilla Rosatello; 6–3, 6–2	(Chinese Taipei) Liang En-shuo (China) Yuan Yue	(China) Zheng Qinwen (Spain) Cristina Bucșa	(France) Océane Dodin (Italy) Martina Di Giuseppe (Burundi) Sada Nahimana (Russia) Oksana Selekhmeteva
June 28	The Hague, Netherlands; Clay; W25; Singles and Doubles Draws	(Netherlands) Quirine Lemoine; 7–5, 6–3	(Hungary) Panna Udvardy	(Netherlands) Arianne Hartono (Netherlands) Richèl Hogenkamp	(Netherlands) Eva Vedder (Latvia) Kamilla Bartone (Hungary) Anna Bondár (Germany) Stephanie Wagner
June 28	The Hague, Netherlands; Clay; W25; Singles and Doubles Draws	(Belgium) Marie Benoît (Romania) Ioana Loredana Roșca; 6–7^{(5–7)}, 7–5, [10–7]	(Mexico) María José Portillo Ramírez (Hungary) Panna Udvardy	(Netherlands) Arianne Hartono (Netherlands) Richèl Hogenkamp	(Netherlands) Eva Vedder (Latvia) Kamilla Bartone (Hungary) Anna Bondár (Germany) Stephanie Wagner
June 28	Wrocław, Poland; Clay; W25; Singles and Doubles Draws	(France) Chloé Paquet; 4–6, 6–3, 6–3	(Turkey) İpek Öz	(Hungary) Réka Luca Jani (Czech Republic) Miriam Kolodziejová	(Poland) Weronika Falkowska (Czech Republic) Monika Kilnarová (Russia) Amina Anshba (Latvia) Diāna Marcinkēviča
June 28	Wrocław, Poland; Clay; W25; Singles and Doubles Draws	(Poland) Anna Hertel (Poland) Martyna Kubka; 7–6^{(7–2)}, 3–6, [10–7]	(Italy) Nuria Brancaccio (Turkey) İpek Öz	(Hungary) Réka Luca Jani (Czech Republic) Miriam Kolodziejová	(Poland) Weronika Falkowska (Czech Republic) Monika Kilnarová (Russia) Amina Anshba (Latvia) Diāna Marcinkēviča
June 28	Palma del Río, Spain; Hard; W25; Singles and Doubles Draws	(Spain) Rebeka Masarova; 6–3, 1–6, 7–6^{(7–4)}	(Switzerland) Lulu Sun	(Russia) Anastasia Zakharova (Spain) Andrea Lázaro García	(Spain) Marina Bassols Ribera (Japan) Eri Hozumi (Spain) Olga Sáez Larra (Australia) Olivia Gadecki
June 28	Palma del Río, Spain; Hard; W25; Singles and Doubles Draws	(Japan) Eri Hozumi (Russia) Valeria Savinykh; 7–6^{(8–6)}, 6–3	(Japan) Himari Sato (Switzerland) Lulu Sun	(Russia) Anastasia Zakharova (Spain) Andrea Lázaro García	(Spain) Marina Bassols Ribera (Japan) Eri Hozumi (Spain) Olga Sáez Larra (Australia) Olivia Gadecki
June 28	Prokuplje, Serbia; Clay; W15; Singles and Doubles Draws	(Latvia) Darja Semenistaja; 6–2, 2–6, 6–3	(France) Alice Robbe	(Spain) Carlota Martínez Círez (Spain) Ana Lantigua de la Nuez	(Canada) Mia Kupres (Slovakia) Eszter Méri (Slovenia) Noka Jurič (Romania) Ioana Gașpar
June 28	Prokuplje, Serbia; Clay; W15; Singles and Doubles Draws	(Romania) Ioana Gașpar (Russia) Ekaterina Vishnevskaya; 6–4, 6–3	(France) Alice Robbe (Serbia) Draginja Vuković	(Spain) Carlota Martínez Círez (Spain) Ana Lantigua de la Nuez	(Canada) Mia Kupres (Slovakia) Eszter Méri (Slovenia) Noka Jurič (Romania) Ioana Gașpar
June 28	Monastir, Tunisia; Hard; W15; Singles and Doubles Draws	(United States) Elizabeth Mandlik; 0–6, 6–2, 6–4	(Italy) Angelica Raggi	(France) Giulia Morlet (United Kingdom) Emilie Lindh	(Canada) Raphaëlle Lacasse (Poland) Joanna Zawadzka (Zimbabwe) Valeria Bhunu (Croatia) Mariana Dražić
June 28	Monastir, Tunisia; Hard; W15; Singles and Doubles Draws	(United States) Anastasia Nefedova (Czech Republic) Laetitia Pulchartová; 7–5, 6–2	(Croatia) Mariana Dražić (Netherlands) Noa Liauw a Fong	(France) Giulia Morlet (United Kingdom) Emilie Lindh	(Canada) Raphaëlle Lacasse (Poland) Joanna Zawadzka (Zimbabwe) Valeria Bhunu (Croatia) Mariana Dražić
June 28	Antalya, Turkey; Clay; W15; Singles and Doubles Draws	(Romania) Ilona Georgiana Ghioroaie; 6–4, 6–3	(Slovenia) Živa Falkner	(Spain) Rosa Vicens Mas (United States) Hurricane Tyra Black	(Norway) Lilly Elida Håseth (Greece) Sapfo Sakellaridi (Japan) Chihiro Takayama (Spain) Claudia Hoste Ferrer
June 28	Antalya, Turkey; Clay; W15; Singles and Doubles Draws	(France) Julie Belgraver (Hungary) Amarissa Kiara Tóth; 6–2, 7–5	(United States) Christina Rosca (Bulgaria) Ani Vangelova	(Spain) Rosa Vicens Mas (United States) Hurricane Tyra Black	(Norway) Lilly Elida Håseth (Greece) Sapfo Sakellaridi (Japan) Chihiro Takayama (Spain) Claudia Hoste Ferrer
