= 2021 Macha Lake Open – Singles =

Singles
- 2021 Macha Lake Open

Final
- Champion: (China) Zheng Qinwen
- Runner-up: (Serbia) Aleksandra Krunić
- Score: 7–6^{(7–5)}, 6–3

Events
Singles	Doubles
← 2019 ·	Macha Lake Open	· 2022 →

Barbora Krejčíková was the defending champion, having won the previous edition in 2019, but chose not to participate.

Zheng Qinwen won the title, defeating Aleksandra Krunić in the final, 7–6^{(7–5)}, 6–3.

== Seeds ==
1. (Slovakia) Kristína Kučová (first round)
2. (Turkey) Çağla Büyükakçay (first round)
3. (United States) Allie Kiick (first round, retired)
4. (Hungary) Réka Luca Jani (quarterfinals)
5. (Slovakia) Rebecca Šramková (first round)
6. (Austria) Julia Grabher (second round)
7. (Paraguay) Verónica Cepede Royg (first round)
8. (Romania) Gabriela Talabă (second round)

== Draw ==
=== Key ===
- Q = Qualifier
- WC = Wild card
- LL = Lucky loser
- Alt = Alternate
- SE = Special exempt
- PR = Protected ranking
- ITF = ITF entry
- JE = Junior exempt
- w/o = Walkover
- r = Retired
- d = Defaulted
- SR = Special ranking

=== Finals ===
Semifinals
(China) Zheng Qinwen	7	6
WC	(Czech Republic) Linda Nosková	5	4
(Serbia) Aleksandra Krunić	6	6
(Romania) Alexandra Cadanțu	2	4

Final
(China) Zheng Qinwen	7^{7}	6
(Serbia) Aleksandra Krunić	6^{5}	3

=== Top half ===
First round
1	(Slovakia) K Kučová	0	3
(China) Q Zheng	6	6
(Netherlands) R Hogenkamp	3	6	1
(Russia) V Kan	6	4	6
Q	(Turkey) İ Öz	1	1
(Croatia) T Mrdeža	6	6
WC	(Czech Republic) D Viďmanová	6	2	4
6	(Austria) J Grabher	4	6	6
3	(United States) A Kiick	1^{r}
(Germany) K Gerlach	4
Q	(Czech Republic) D Šalková	4	7^{7}	3
Q	(Spain) I Burillo Escorihuela	6	6^{4}	6
(Hungary) A Bondár	6	6
Q	(Czech Republic) M Kolodziejová	4	4
WC	(Czech Republic) L Nosková	7^{7}	6
7	(Paraguay) V Cepede Royg	6^{5}	4

Second round
(China) Q Zheng	4
(Russia) V Kan	0^{r}
(Croatia) T Mrdeža	7	6^{2}	6
6	(Austria) J Grabher	5	7^{7}	3
(Germany) K Gerlach	1	6	1
Q	(Spain) I Burillo Escorihuela	6	3	6
(Hungary) A Bondár	1	7^{7}	5
WC	(Czech Republic) L Nosková	6	6^{2}	7

Quarterfinals
(China) Q Zheng	7^{7}	6
(Croatia) T Mrdeža	6^{2}	2
Q	(Spain) I Burillo Escorihuela	5	2
WC	(Czech Republic) L Nosková	7	6

Semifinals
(China) Q Zheng	7	6
WC	(Czech Republic) L Nosková	5	4

=== Bottom half ===
First round
8	(Romania) G Talabă	6	6
Q	(Belgium) K Zimmermann	2	3
Q	(Romania) A Prisăcariu	6	3	2
(Serbia) A Krunić	3	6	6
(United States) W Osuigwe	6	6^{3}	4
WC	(Czech Republic) S Bejlek	2	7^{7}	6
(Switzerland) S Waltert	4	6	4
4	(Hungary) RL Jani	6	2	6
5	(Slovakia) R Šramková	6	3	4
WC	(Czech Republic) N Bartůňková	1	6	6
PR	(Australia) D Aiava	3	3
(Romania) A Cadanțu	6	6
Q	(Czech Republic) T Smitková	6	6
Q	(Czech Republic) J Marková	3	4
PR	(Romania) A Dulgheru	6	6
2	(Turkey) Ç Büyükakçay	2	4

Second round
8	(Romania) G Talabă	5	1
(Serbia) A Krunić	7	6
WC	(Czech Republic) S Bejlek	4	3
4	(Hungary) RL Jani	6	6
WC	(Czech Republic) N Bartůňková	6^{4}	1
(Romania) A Cadanțu	7^{7}	6
Q	(Czech Republic) T Smitková	6^{4}	1
PR	(Romania) A Dulgheru	7^{7}	6

Quarterfinals
(Serbia) A Krunić	6	3	6
4	(Hungary) RL Jani	2	6	3
(Romania) A Cadanțu	5	6	4
PR	(Romania) A Dulgheru	7	1	1^{r}

Semifinals
(Serbia) A Krunić	6	6
(Romania) A Cadanțu	2	4
