= 2021 Macha Lake Open – Doubles =

Doubles
- 2021 Macha Lake Open

Final
- Champions: (Greece) Valentini Grammatikopoulou (Netherlands) Richèl Hogenkamp
- Runners-up: (Russia) Amina Anshba (Czech Republic) Anastasia Dețiuc
- Score: 6–3, 6–4

Events
Singles	Doubles
← 2019 ·	Macha Lake Open	· 2022 →

Natela Dzalamidze and Nina Stojanović were the defending champions, having won the previous edition in 2019, but Stojanović chose not to participate. Dzalamidze played alongside Paula Kania-Choduń but lost in the quarterfinals to Valentini Grammatikopoulou and Richèl Hogenkamp.

Grammatikopoulou and Hogenkamp went on to win the title, defeating Amina Anshba and Anastasia Dețiuc in the final, 6–3, 6–4.

== Seeds ==
1. (Russia) Natela Dzalamidze / (Poland) Paula Kania-Choduń (quarterfinals)
2. (Hungary) Anna Bondár / (Belgium) Kimberley Zimmermann (semifinals)
3. (Russia) Amina Anshba / (Czech Republic) Anastasia Dețiuc (final)
4. (United States) Whitney Osuigwe / (Romania) Gabriela Talabă (quarterfinals, withdrew)

== Draw ==
=== Key ===
- Q = Qualifier
- WC = Wild card
- LL = Lucky loser
- Alt = Alternate
- SE = Special exempt
- PR = Protected ranking
- ITF = ITF entry
- JE = Junior exempt
- w/o = Walkover
- r = Retired
- d = Defaulted
- SR = Special ranking

=== Draw ===
First round
1	(Russia) N Dzalamidze (Poland) P Kania-Choduń	6	6
WC	(Czech Republic) D Hindová (Czech Republic) D Šalková	4	4
(Greece) V Grammatikopoulou (Netherlands) R Hogenkamp	6	6
(Czech Republic) M Kolodziejová (Czech Republic) J Marková	4	4
4	(United States) W Osuigwe (Romania) G Talabă	7	2	[10]
(Czech Republic) K Kubáňová (Czech Republic) N Tomanová	5	6	[5]
(Romania) A Prisăcariu (Slovenia) N Radišić	5	6	[8]
WC	(Czech Republic) L Havlíčková (Czech Republic) L Nosková	7	3	[10]
(Germany) T Morderger (Germany) Y Morderger	6	3	[10]
(Turkey) İ Öz (Czech Republic) A Sisková	4	6	[6]
(Russia) A Fomina (Czech Republic) A Zarycká	6	3	[4]
3	(Russia) A Anshba (Czech Republic) A Dețiuc	4	6	[10]
WC	(Czech Republic) N Bartůňková (Czech Republic) S Bejlek	4	6	[10]
(Australia) D Aiava (Slovakia) C Škamlová	6	3	[12]
(Uzbekistan) A Amanmuradova (Belarus) V Lapko	6^{1}	6	[8]
2	(Hungary) A Bondár (Belgium) K Zimmermann	7^{7}	4	[10]

Quarterfinals
1	(Russia) N Dzalamidze (Poland) P Kania-Choduń	4	1
(Greece) V Grammatikopoulou (Netherlands) R Hogenkamp	6	6
4	(United States) W Osuigwe (Romania) G Talabă
WC	(Czech Republic) L Havlíčková (Czech Republic) L Nosková	w/o
(Germany) T Morderger (Germany) Y Morderger	6^{3}	3
3	(Russia) A Anshba (Czech Republic) A Dețiuc	7^{7}	6
(Australia) D Aiava (Slovakia) C Škamlová	4	4
2	(Hungary) A Bondár (Belgium) K Zimmermann	6	6

Semifinals
(Greece) V Grammatikopoulou (Netherlands) R Hogenkamp	7	5	[10]
WC	(Czech Republic) L Havlíčková (Czech Republic) L Nosková	5	7	[4]
3	(Russia) A Anshba (Czech Republic) A Dețiuc	6	6^{5}	[10]
2	(Hungary) A Bondár (Belgium) K Zimmermann	4	7^{7}	[6]

Final
(Greece) V Grammatikopoulou (Netherlands) R Hogenkamp	6	6
3	(Russia) A Anshba (Czech Republic) A Dețiuc	3	4
