= 2019 Macha Lake Open – Singles =

Singles
- 2019 Macha Lake Open

Final
- Champion: (Czech Republic) Barbora Krejčíková
- Runner-up: (Czech Republic) Denisa Allertová
- Score: 6–2, 6–3

Events
Singles	Doubles
← 2018 ·	Macha Lake Open	· 2020 →

Monika Kilnarová was the defending champion, but lost to Dejana Radanović in the first round.

Barbora Krejčíková won the title, defeating wildcard Denisa Allertová 6–2, 6–3 in the final.

== Seeds ==
1. (Czech Republic) Barbora Krejčíková (champion)
2. (Slovakia) Rebecca Šramková (second round)
3. (Ukraine) Anhelina Kalinina (quarterfinals)
4. (Slovakia) Kristína Kučová (second round)
5. (Argentina) Paula Ormaechea (quarterfinals)
6. (Czech Republic) Anastasia Zarycká (first round)
7. (Romania) Alexandra Cadanțu (semifinals)
8. (Serbia) Dejana Radanović (second round)

== Draw ==
=== Key ===
- Q = Qualifier
- WC = Wild card
- LL = Lucky loser
- Alt = Alternate
- SE = Special exempt
- PR = Protected ranking
- ITF = ITF entry
- JE = Junior exempt
- w/o = Walkover
- r = Retired
- d = Defaulted
- SR = Special ranking

=== Finals ===
Semifinals
1	(Czech Republic) Barbora Krejčíková	6	6
(Romania) Laura Ioana Paar	2	2
7	(Romania) Alexandra Cadanțu	4	7^{7}	4
WC	(Czech Republic) Denisa Allertová	6	6^{3}	6

Final
1	(Czech Republic) Barbora Krejčíková	6	6
WC	(Czech Republic) Denisa Allertová	2	3

=== Top half ===
First round
1	(Czech Republic) B Krejčíková	6	6
Q	(Czech Republic) N Tomanová	2	4
Q	(Poland) M Chwalińska	6	6
(Italy) S Errani	3	3
Q	(Czech Republic) A Dețiuc	4	3
(United States) L Chirico	6	6
Q	(Romania) G Talabă	2	5
5	(Argentina) P Ormaechea	6	7
3	(Ukraine) A Kalinina	6	6
Q	(Russia) A Anshba	4	0
(Russia) S Lansere	3	7	6
(Australia) O Rogowska	6	5	2
WC	(Czech Republic) M Pantůčková	7	2	2
(Romania) LI Paar	5	6	6
WC	(Czech Republic) M Kilnarová	6	3	5
8	(Serbia) D Radanović	4	6	7

Second round
1	(Czech Republic) B Krejčíková	6^{2}	7	6
Q	(Poland) M Chwalińska	7^{7}	5	3
(United States) L Chirico	6^{8}	2
5	(Argentina) P Ormaechea	7^{10}	6
3	(Ukraine) A Kalinina	6	6
(Russia) S Lansere	1	0
(Romania) LI Paar	6	6
8	(Serbia) D Radanović	4	2

Quarterfinals
1	(Czech Republic) B Krejčíková	6	2	6
5	(Argentina) P Ormaechea	1	6	1
3	(Ukraine) A Kalinina	4	5
(Romania) LI Paar	6	7

Semifinals
1	(Czech Republic) B Krejčíková	6	6
(Romania) LI Paar	2	2

=== Bottom half ===
First round
7	(Romania) A Cadanțu	7^{7}	7
Q	(Brazil) T Pereira	6^{4}	5
Q	(Poland) P Kania	7^{7}	7
Q	(Italy) G Marchetti	6^{5}	5
(Czech Republic) L Hradecká	3	6	6
(Hungary) D Gálfi	6	2	1
(Italy) A Grymalska	2	6	3
4	(Slovakia) K Kučová	6	4	6
6	(Czech Republic) A Zarycká	2	2
(Chile) D Seguel	6	6
(Serbia) N Stojanović	6^{3}	3
(Belarus) O Govortsova	7^{7}	6
WC	(Czech Republic) D Allertová	6	6
(Japan) K Okamura	3	4
WC	(Czech Republic) J Malečková	2	5
2	(Slovakia) R Šramková	6	7

Second round
7	(Romania) A Cadanțu	6	6
Q	(Poland) P Kania	4	1
(Czech Republic) L Hradecká	6	6
4	(Slovakia) K Kučová	3	4
(Chile) D Seguel	3	0
(Belarus) O Govortsova	6	6
WC	(Czech Republic) D Allertová	6	6
2	(Slovakia) R Šramková	3	4

Quarterfinals
7	(Romania) A Cadanțu	6	6
(Czech Republic) L Hradecká	3	2
(Belarus) O Govortsova	2	1
WC	(Czech Republic) D Allertová	6	6

Semifinals
7	(Romania) A Cadanțu	4	7^{7}	4
WC	(Czech Republic) D Allertová	6	6^{3}	6
