= 2019 Macha Lake Open – Doubles =

Doubles
- 2019 Macha Lake Open

Final
- Champions: (Russia) Natela Dzalamidze (Serbia) Nina Stojanović
- Runners-up: (Japan) Kyōka Okamura (Serbia) Dejana Radanović
- Score: 6–3, 6–3

Events
Singles	Doubles
← 2018 ·	Macha Lake Open	· 2020 →

Maria Marfutina and Anastasia Zarycká were the defending champions, but Marfutina chose not to participate. Zarycká partnered Laura Ioana Paar but lost in the first round to Sofya Lansere and Kamilla Rakhimova.

Natela Dzalamidze and Nina Stojanović won the title, defeating Kyōka Okamura and Dejana Radanović in the final, 6–3, 6–3.

== Seeds ==
1. (Russia) Natela Dzalamidze / (Serbia) Nina Stojanović (champions)
2. (France) Elixane Lechemia / (Italy) Giorgia Marchetti (quarterfinals)
3. (Chinese Taipei) Chen Pei-hsuan / (Chinese Taipei) Wu Fang-hsien (semifinals)
4. (Venezuela) Andrea Gámiz / (Argentina) Paula Ormaechea (quarterfinals)

== Draw ==
=== Key ===
- Q = Qualifier
- WC = Wild card
- LL = Lucky loser
- Alt = Alternate
- SE = Special exempt
- PR = Protected ranking
- ITF = ITF entry
- JE = Junior exempt
- w/o = Walkover
- r = Retired
- d = Defaulted
- SR = Special ranking

=== Draw ===
First round
1	(Russia) N Dzalamidze (Serbia) N Stojanović	6	7
(Italy) A Grymalska (Chile) D Seguel	2	5
WC	(Czech Republic) L Pulchartová (Czech Republic) K Vlčková	1	1
(Russia) A Anshba (Czech Republic) A Dețiuc	6	6
3	(Chinese Taipei) P-h Chen (Chinese Taipei) F-h Wu	6	6
(Slovakia) K Kučová (Slovakia) C Škamlová	2	1
(Poland) M Chwalińska (Czech Republic) J Marková	1	4
(Poland) P Kania (Australia) O Rogowska	6	6
(Russia) S Lansere (Russia) K Rakhimova	7	6
(Romania) LI Paar (Czech Republic) A Zarycká	5	4
WC	(Czech Republic) P Csabi (Czech Republic) A Sisková	3	0
4	(Venezuela) A Gámiz (Argentina) P Ormaechea	6	6
(Japan) K Okamura (Serbia) D Radanović	6	1	[10]
WC	(Czech Republic) K Hrabalová (Czech Republic) N Tomanová	4	6	[4]
(Romania) E Bogdan (Romania) G Talabă	6	5	[8]
2	(France) E Lechemia (Italy) G Marchetti	4	7	[10]

Quarterfinals
1	(Russia) N Dzalamidze (Serbia) N Stojanović	6	3	[10]
(Russia) A Anshba (Czech Republic) A Dețiuc	3	6	[4]
3	(Chinese Taipei) P-h Chen (Chinese Taipei) F-h Wu	7	6
(Poland) P Kania (Australia) O Rogowska	5	3
(Russia) S Lansere (Russia) K Rakhimova	4	6	[10]
4	(Venezuela) A Gámiz (Argentina) P Ormaechea	6	1	[8]
(Japan) K Okamura (Serbia) D Radanović	7^{8}	7^{7}
2	(France) E Lechemia (Italy) G Marchetti	6^{6}	6^{3}

Semifinals
1	(Russia) N Dzalamidze (Serbia) N Stojanović	6	6
3	(Chinese Taipei) P-h Chen (Chinese Taipei) F-h Wu	3	3
(Russia) S Lansere (Russia) K Rakhimova	3	6	[9]
(Japan) K Okamura (Serbia) D Radanović	6	2	[11]

Final
1	(Russia) N Dzalamidze (Serbia) N Stojanović	6	6
(Japan) K Okamura (Serbia) D Radanović	3	3
