= 2019 Macha Lake Open =

- Date: 17–23 June 2019
- Edition: 18th
- Category: ITF Women's World Tennis Tour
- Prize money: $60,000+H
- Surface: Clay
- Location: Staré Splavy, Czech Republic

Champions

Singles
- (Czech Republic) Barbora Krejčíková

Doubles
- (Russia) Natela Dzalamidze / (Serbia) Nina Stojanović
- Macha Lake Open

The 2019 Macha Lake Open was a professional tennis tournament played on outdoor clay courts. It was the eighteenth edition of the tournament which was part of the 2019 ITF Women's World Tennis Tour. It took place in Staré Splavy, Czech Republic between 17 and 23 June 2019.

== Singles main-draw entrants ==
=== Seeds ===
Country	Player	Rank^{1}	Seed
CZE	Barbora Krejčíková	136	1
SVK	Rebecca Šramková	140	2
UKR	Anhelina Kalinina	145	3
SVK	Kristína Kučová	155	4
ARG	Paula Ormaechea	191	5
CZE	Anastasia Zarycká	212	6
ROU	Alexandra Cadanțu	227	7
SRB	Dejana Radanović	233	8

- ^{1} Rankings are as of 10 June 2019.

=== Other entrants ===
The following players received wildcards into the singles main draw:

- (Czech Republic) Denisa Allertová
- (Czech Republic) Monika Kilnarová
- (Czech Republic) Jesika Malečková
- (Czech Republic) Magdaléna Pantůčková

The following players received entry from the qualifying draw:

- (Russia) Amina Anshba
- (Poland) Maja Chwalińska
- (Czech Republic) Anastasia Dețiuc
- (Poland) Paula Kania
- (Italy) Giorgia Marchetti
- (Brazil) Teliana Pereira
- (Romania) Gabriela Talabă
- (Czech Republic) Nikola Tomanová

== Champions ==
=== Singles ===
- (Czech Republic) Barbora Krejčíková def. (Czech Republic) Denisa Allertová, 6–2, 6–3

=== Doubles ===
- (Russia) Natela Dzalamidze / (Serbia) Nina Stojanović def. (Japan) Kyōka Okamura / (Serbia) Dejana Radanović, 6–3, 6–3
