= 2021 Macha Lake Open =

Tennis tournament

- Date: 14–20 June 2021
- Edition: 19th
- Category: ITF Women's World Tennis Tour
- Prize money: $60,000
- Surface: Clay
- Location: Staré Splavy, Czech Republic

Champions

Singles
- (China) Zheng Qinwen

Doubles
- (Greece) Valentini Grammatikopoulou / (Netherlands) Richèl Hogenkamp
- Macha Lake Open

The 2021 Macha Lake Open was a professional women's tennis tournament played on outdoor clay courts. It was the nineteenth edition of the tournament which was part of the 2021 ITF Women's World Tennis Tour. It took place in Staré Splavy, Czech Republic between 14 and 20 June 2021.

== Singles main-draw entrants ==
=== Seeds ===
Country	Player	Rank^{1}	Seed
SVK	Kristína Kučová	150	1
TUR	Çağla Büyükakçay	179	2
USA	Allie Kiick	181	3
HUN	Réka Luca Jani	185	4
SVK	Rebecca Šramková	193	5
AUT	Julia Grabher	195	6
PAR	Verónica Cepede Royg	199	7
ROU	Gabriela Talabă	211	8

- ^{1} Rankings are as of 31 May 2021.

=== Other entrants ===
The following players received wildcards into the singles main draw:

- (Czech Republic) Nikola Bartůňková
- (Czech Republic) Sára Bejlek
- (Czech Republic) Linda Nosková
- (Czech Republic) Darja Viďmanová

The following player received entry using a protected ranking:

- (Australia) Destanee Aiava
- (Romania) Alexandra Dulgheru

The following players received entry from the qualifying draw:

- (Spain) Irene Burillo Escorihuela
- (Czech Republic) Miriam Kolodziejová
- (Czech Republic) Johana Marková
- (Turkey) İpek Öz
- (Romania) Andreea Prisăcariu
- (Czech Republic) Dominika Šalková
- (Czech Republic) Tereza Smitková
- (Belgium) Kimberley Zimmermann

== Champions ==
=== Singles ===
- (China) Zheng Qinwen def. (Serbia) Aleksandra Krunić, 7–6^{(7–5)}, 6–3

=== Doubles ===
- (Greece) Valentini Grammatikopoulou / (Netherlands) Richèl Hogenkamp def. (Russia) Amina Anshba / (Czech Republic) Anastasia Dețiuc, 6–3, 6–4
