= Dejana Radanović =

Serbian tennis player

Dejana Radanović Дејана Радановић
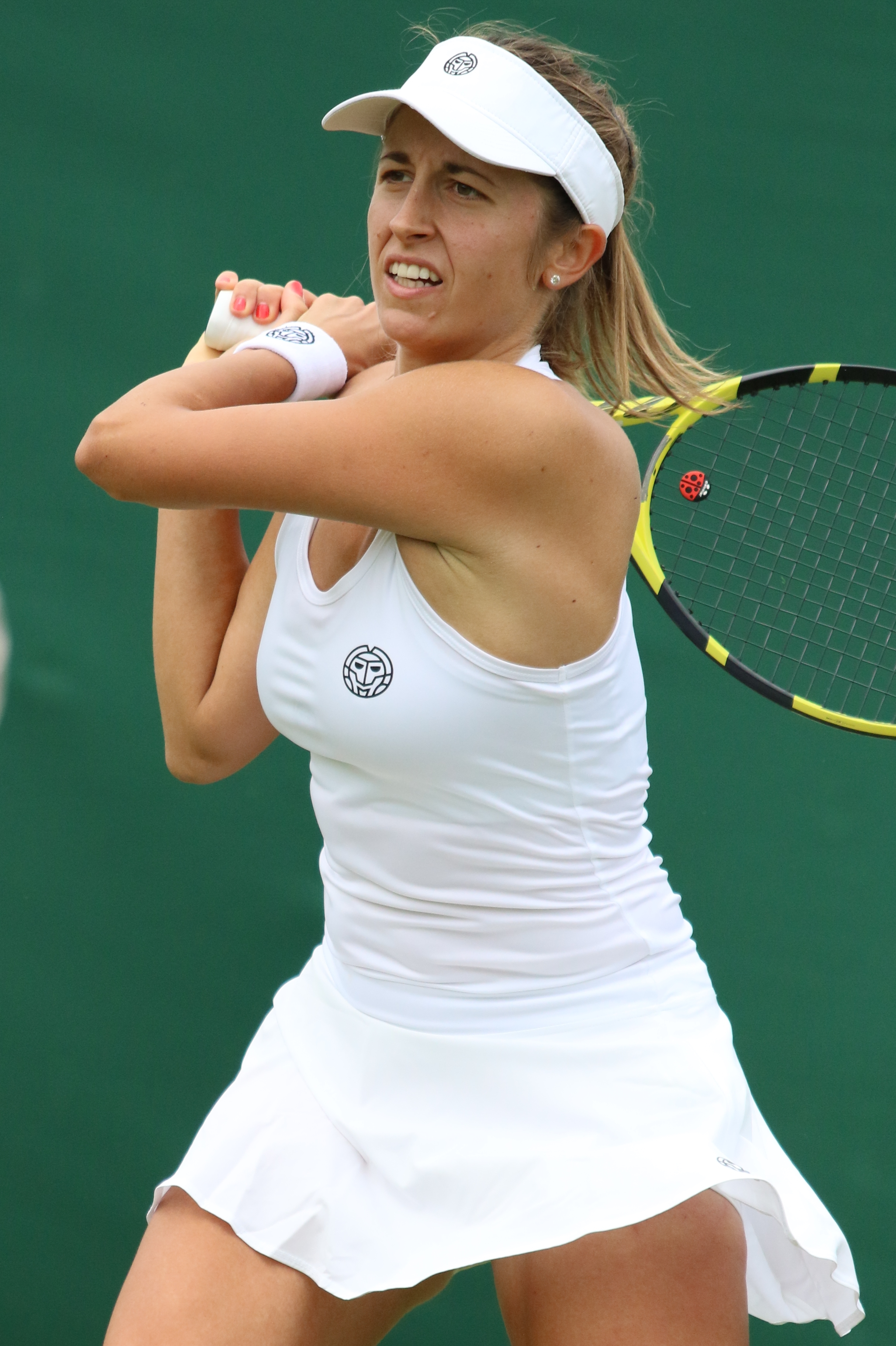
- Radanović at 2019 Wimbledon Championships
- Country (sports): Serbia
- Residence: Novi Sad, Serbia
- Born: 14 May 1996 (age 30) Zrenjanin, Serbia, FR Yugoslavia
- Height: 1.72 m (5 ft 7 1/2 in)
- Turned pro: 2013
- Plays: Right-handed (two-handed backhand)
- Coach: Boris Čonkić (2012–2018); Petar Čonkić (2017–)
- Prize money: $246,638

Singles
- Career record: 333–216
- Career titles: 12 ITF
- Highest ranking: No. 187 (2 July 2018)

Grand Slam singles results
- Australian Open: Q1 (2019)
- French Open: Q1 (2024)
- Wimbledon: Q1 (2019)
- US Open: Q1 (2018)

Doubles
- Career record: 36–31
- Career titles: 3 ITF
- Highest ranking: No. 398 (14 June 2021)

Team competitions
- Fed Cup: 4–6

Dejana Radanović (Serbian Cyrillic: Дејана Радановић; born 14 May 1996) is a Serbian inactive tennis player.

Radanović has won 12 singles titles and three doubles titles on the ITF Women's Circuit. On 2 July 2018, she reached her best WTA singles ranking of world No. 187. On 14 June 2021, she peaked at No. 398 in doubles.

Radanović has represented Serbia in the Fed Cup, where she has a win–loss record of 4–6.

== Career ==
=== 2018: WTA Tour debut ===
She made her WTA Tour main-draw debut through qualifying at the 2018 Nürnberger Versicherungscup, losing in the first round to two-time defending champion Kiki Bertens.

=== 2024: United Cup debut ===
Partnering with compatriot Nikola Ćaćić, she made her debut at the United Cup as part of team Serbia.

== Performance timelines ==
Key
W	F	SF	QF	#R	RR	Q#	DNQ	A	NH

(W) winner; (F) finalist; (SF) semifinalist; (QF) quarterfinalist; (#R) rounds 4, 3, 2, 1; (RR) round-robin stage; (Q#) qualification round; (DNQ) did not qualify; (A) absent; (NH) not held; (SR) strike rate (events won / competed); (W–L) win–loss record.
To avoid confusion and double counting, these charts are updated at the conclusion of a tournament or when the player's participation has ended.

Only main-draw results in WTA Tour, Grand Slam tournaments, Fed Cup/Billie Jean King Cup and Olympic Games are included in win–loss records.

=== Singles ===
Current through the 2024 French Open.

Tournament	2018	2019	...	2024	2025	SR	W–L
Grand Slam tournaments
Australian Open	A	Q1		A	A	0 / 0	0–0
French Open	A	A		Q1	A	0 / 0	0–0
Wimbledon	A	Q1		A	A	0 / 0	0–0
US Open	Q1	A		A	A	0 / 0	0–0
Win–loss	0–0	0–0		0–0	0–0	0 / 0	0–0
Career statistics
Tournaments	3	0		0	0	Career total: 3	
Titles	0	0		0	0	Career total: 0	
Finals	0	0		0	0	Career total: 0	
Overall win–loss	0–3	0–0		0–0	0–0	0 / 3	0–3
Year-end ranking	205	284		307	1114		

== ITF Circuit finals ==
=== Singles: 24 (12 titles, 12 runner-ups) ===
Legend W40/50 tournaments W25 tournaments W10/15 tournaments	Finals by surface Hard (4–4) Clay (6–7) Carpet (2–1)

Result	W–L	Date	Tournament	Tier	Surface	Opponent	Score
Loss	0–1	Aug 2015	ITF Vinkovci, Croatia	W10	Clay	(Slovakia) Chantal Škamlová	6–4, 3–6, 5–7
Loss	0–2	Aug 2015	ITF Koper, Slovenia	W10	Clay	(Argentina) Julieta Estable	6–3, 4–6, 2–6
Loss	0–3	Sep 2016	Hódmezővásárhely Open, Hungary	W25	Clay	(Romania) Irina Bara	5–7, 4–6
Win	1–3	Oct 2016	ITF Sozopol, Bulgaria	W10	Hard	(Romania) Andreea Roșca	4–0 ret.
Win	2–3	Feb 2017	ITF Antalya, Turkey	W15	Clay	(Turkey) Başak Eraydın	6–4, 7–6^{(1)}
Loss	2–4	Feb 2017	ITF Antalya, Turkey	W15	Clay	(Romania) Cristina Dinu	3–6, 3–6
Win	3–4	Mar 2017	ITF Heraklion, Greece	W15	Clay	(Italy) Giulia Gatto-Monticone	7–5, 6–3
Win	4–4	Mar 2017	ITF Heraklion, Greece	W15	Clay	(Romania) Raluca Șerban	6–4, 7–6^{(1)}
Win	5–4	May 2017	Khimki Ladies Cup, Russia	W25	Hard (i)	(Russia) Anna Morgina	6–3, 6–3
Win	6–4	Mar 2018	ITF Toyota, Japan	W25	Hard	(Canada) Katherine Sebov	6–4, 3–6, 6–4
Loss	6–5	Jun 2018	ITF Óbidos, Portugal	W25	Carpet	(Poland) Katarzyna Kawa	6–4, 5–7, 3–6
Win	7–5	Jun 2018	ITF Óbidos, Portugal	W25	Carpet	(Italy) Giulia Gatto-Monticone	6–2, 6–1
Win	8–5	Jun 2018	ITF Óbidos, Portugal	W25	Carpet	(Spain) Nuria Párrizas Díaz	6–3, 6–3
Loss	8–6	Aug 2019	ITF Grodzisk Mazowiecki, Poland	W25	Clay	(Poland) Maja Chwalińska	6–7^{(5)}, 4–6
Win	9–6	Sep 2019	ITF Kaposvár, Hungary	W25	Clay	(Slovenia) Veronika Erjavec	6–2, 6–3
Loss	9–7	Jan 2020	Tatarstan Open, Russia	W25	Hard (i)	(Russia) Anastasia Zakharova	3–6, 2–6
Loss	9–8	Mar 2022	ITF Antalya, Turkey	W15	Clay	(Spain) Rosa Vicens Mas	4–6, 7–5, 1–6
Win	10–8	Feb 2023	ITF Monastir, Tunisia	W15	Hard	(China) Liu Fangzhou	6–7^{(5)}, 6–3, 6–2
Win	11–8	Aug 2023	ITF Koksijde, Belgium	W25	Clay	(Belgium) Hanne Vandewinkel	4–6, 7–6^{(4)}, 6–2
Win	12–8	Sep 2023	ITF Skopje, North Macedonia	W40	Clay	(Croatia) Iva Primorac	6–1, 6–3
Loss	12–9	Nov 2023	ITF Santo Domingo, Dominican Rep.	W25	Hard	(Mexico) Ana Sofía Sánchez	6–1, 6–7^{(0)}, 2–6
Loss	12–10	Mar 2024	ITF Helsinki, Finland	W35	Hard (i)	(Norway) Malene Helgø	3–6, 2–6
Loss	12–11	Sep 2024	ITF Slobozia, Romania	W50	Clay	(Burundi) Sada Nahimana	4–6, 1–6
Loss	12–12	May 2025	ITF San Diego, United States	W15	Hard	(United Kingdom) Katie Swan	4–6, 0–6

=== Doubles: 4 (3 titles, 1 runner-up) ===
Legend W60 tournaments W25 tournaments W10/15 tournaments	Finals by surface Hard (2–0) Clay (1–1)

Result	W–L	Date	Tournament	Tier	Surface	Partner	Opponents	Score
Win	1–0	Oct 2016	ITF Sozopol, Bulgaria	W10	Hard	(Bulgaria) Petia Arshinkova	(Czech Republic) Kateřina Kramperová (Russia) Angelina Zhuravleva	6–1, 6–3
Loss	1–1	Jun 2019	Macha Lake Open, Czech Republic	W60+H	Clay	(Japan) Kyōka Okamura	(Russia) Natela Dzalamidze (Serbia) Nina Stojanović	3–6, 3–6
Win	2–1	Sep 2020	Zagreb Ladies Open, Croatia	W25	Clay	(Croatia) Silvia Njirić	(Greece) Valentini Grammatikopoulou (Mexico) Ana Sofía Sánchez	4–6, 7–5, [10–8]
Win	3–1	Apr 2023	ITF Monastir, Tunisia	W15	Hard	(Serbia) Elena Milovanović	(China) Wang Jiaqi (China) Yang Yidi	w/o
