= 2022 Macha Lake Open – Singles =

Singles
- 2022 Macha Lake Open

Final
- Champion: (Czech Republic) Sára Bejlek
- Runner-up: (Czech Republic) Jesika Malečková
- Score: 6–4, 6–4

Events
| Singles | Doubles |
| ← 2021 · | Macha Lake Open | · 2024 → |

Zheng Qinwen was the defending champion but chose to participate at the 2022 WTA German Open instead.

Sára Bejlek won the title defeating Jesika Malečková in the final, 6–4, 6–4.

== Seeds ==
All seeds receive a bye into the second round.

1. (Hungary) Panna Udvardy (third round)
2. (Czech Republic) Linda Nosková (quarterfinals)
3. (Greece) Despina Papamichail (semifinals)
4. (Mexico) Renata Zarazúa (quarterfinals)
5. (Liechtenstein) Kathinka von Deichmann (second round)
6. (Argentina) María Lourdes Carlé (third round)
7. (Brazil) Carolina Alves (second round)
8. (Slovakia) Rebecca Šramková (semifinals)
9. (United States) Francesca Di Lorenzo (third round)
10. (Czech Republic) Jesika Malečková (final)
11. (Switzerland) Conny Perrin (quarterfinals)
12. (Czech Republic) Sára Bejlek (champion)
13. (North Macedonia) Lina Gjorcheska (quarterfinals)
14. (Spain) Irene Burillo Escorihuela (second round, retired)
15. (Czech Republic) Tereza Smitková (third round)
16. (Romania) Andreea Prisăcariu (second round)

== Draw ==
=== Key ===
- Q = Qualifier
- WC = Wild card
- LL = Lucky loser
- Alt = Alternate
- SE = Special exempt
- PR = Protected ranking
- ITF = ITF entry
- JE = Junior exempt
- w/o = Walkover
- r = Retired
- d = Defaulted
- SR = Special ranking

=== Finals ===
Quarterfinals
13 | (North Macedonia) Lina Gjorcheska | 3 | 4
10 | (Czech Republic) Jesika Malečková | 6 | 6
3 | (Greece) Despina Papamichail | 7^{7} | 6
11 | (Switzerland) Conny Perrin | 6^{4} | 3
12 | (Czech Republic) Sára Bejlek | 7^{7} | 6^{2} | 7
4 | (Mexico) Renata Zarazúa | 6^{3} | 7^{7} | 5
8 | (Slovakia) Rebecca Šramková | 3 | 6 | 6
2 | (Czech Republic) Linda Nosková | 6 | 4 | 4

Semifinals
10 | (Czech Republic) Jesika Malečková | 6 | 6
3 | (Greece) Despina Papamichail | 3 | 1
12 | (Czech Republic) Sára Bejlek | 6 | 6
8 | (Slovakia) Rebecca Šramková | 1 | 1

Final
10 | (Czech Republic) Jesika Malečková | 4 | 4
12 | (Czech Republic) Sára Bejlek | 6 | 6

=== Top half ===
==== Section 1 ====
First round
(Colombia) Y Lizarazo | 2 | 7^{7} | 2
(Germany) Y Morderger | 6 | 6^{3} | 6
(Czech Republic) A Laboutková | 7 | 6
Q | (Slovakia) E Méri | 5 | 3
Q | (Germany) L Meyer auf der Heide | 3 | 6 | 6
Q | (Slovakia) B Behúlová | 6 | 3 | 3
Q | (Italy) A Zantedeschi | 6 | 5 | 6
LL | (Slovakia) T Jarušková | 1 | 7 | 1

Second round
1 | (Hungary) P Udvardy | 6 | 6
(Germany) Y Morderger | 4 | 3
(Czech Republic) A Laboutková | 2 | 3
13 | (North Macedonia) L Gjorcheska | 6 | 6
10 | (Czech Republic) J Malečková | 6 | 6
Q | (Germany) L Meyer auf der Heide | 3 | 1
Q | (Italy) A Zantedeschi | 6 | 4 | 6
5 | (Liechtenstein) K von Deichmann | 2 | 6 | 4

Third round
1 | (Hungary) P Udvardy | 2 | 5
13 | (North Macedonia) L Gjorcheska | 6 | 7
10 | (Czech Republic) J Malečková | 6 | 6
Q | (Italy) A Zantedeschi | 2 | 2

Quarterfinals
13 | (North Macedonia) L Gjorcheska | 3 | 4
10 | (Czech Republic) J Malečková | 6 | 6

==== Section 2 ====
First round
WC | (Czech Republic) J Štruplová | 6 | 4 | 4
(Czech Republic) B Palicová | 4 | 6 | 6
WC | (Czech Republic) A Šmejkalová | 7 | 3 | 2
(Japan) N Hanatani | 5 | 6 | 6
Q | (Slovakia) N Daubnerová | 6^{3} | 6 | 6
(Greece) S Sakellaridi | 7^{7} | 2 | 2
(Norway) M Helgø | 5 | 7 | 6
(Czech Republic) J Marková | 7 | 5 | 3

Second round
3 | (Greece) D Papamichail | 4 | 6 | 6
(Czech Republic) B Palicová | 6 | 1 | 1
(Japan) N Hanatani | 4 | 3
15 | (Czech Republic) T Smitková | 6 | 6
11 | (Switzerland) C Perrin | 6 | 6
Q | (Slovakia) N Daubnerová | 3 | 0
(Norway) M Helgø | 4 | 6 | 6
7 | (Brazil) C Alves | 6 | 1 | 1

Third round
3 | (Greece) D Papamichail | 6 | 6
15 | (Czech Republic) T Smitková | 2 | 0
11 | (Switzerland) C Perrin | 6 | 6
(Norway) M Helgø | 3 | 4

Quarterfinals
3 | (Greece) D Papamichail | 7^{7} | 6
11 | (Switzerland) C Perrin | 6^{4} | 3

=== Bottom half ===
==== Section 3 ====
First round
(Italy) B Turati | 6 | 3 | 3
(France) A Ramé | 1 | 6 | 6
(Italy) A Turati | 6 | 4 | 6
Q | (Czech Republic) N Břečková | 1 | 6 | 2
(Italy) M Colmegna | 6 | 7^{8}
Q | (Czech Republic) D Hindová | 0 | 6^{6}
Q | (Czech Republic) K Kubáňová | 4 | 2
(Italy) N Brancaccio | 6 | 6

Second round
6 | (Argentina) ML Carlé | 7 | 6
(France) A Ramé | 5 | 2
(Italy) A Turati | 6 | 2 | 3
12 | (Czech Republic) S Bejlek | 1 | 6 | 6
14 | (Spain) I Burillo Escorihuela | 6^{3} | 0^{r}
(Italy) M Colmegna | 7^{7} | 0
(Italy) N Brancaccio | 6 | 2 | 3
4 | (Mexico) R Zarazúa | 4 | 6 | 6

Third round
6 | (Argentina) ML Carlé | 3 | 2
12 | (Czech Republic) S Bejlek | 6 | 6
(Italy) M Colmegna | 5 | 3
4 | (Mexico) R Zarazúa | 7 | 6

Quarterfinals
12 | (Czech Republic) S Bejlek | 7^{7} | 6^{2} | 7
4 | (Mexico) R Zarazúa | 6^{3} | 7^{7} | 5

==== Section 4 ====
First round
(Czech Republic) N Bartůňková | 4 | 6 | 6^{4}
WC | (Czech Republic) L Klimovičová | 6 | 4 | 7^{7}
(Slovenia) N Potočnik | 7 | 3 | 6
(Germany) T Morderger | 5 | 6 | 4
WC | (Czech Republic) K Vlčková | 3 | 3
WC | (Czech Republic) L Havlíčková | 6 | 6
(Czech Republic) D Šalková | 4 | 6 | 6
LL | (Czech Republic) D Hrdinková | 6 | 4 | 2

Second round
8 | (Slovakia) R Šramková | 6 | 6
WC | (Czech Republic) L Klimovičová | 1 | 3
(Slovenia) N Potočnik | 6^{5} | 3
9 | (United States) F Di Lorenzo | 7^{7} | 6
16 | (Romania) A Prisăcariu | 3 | 4
WC | (Czech Republic) L Havlíčková | 6 | 6
(Czech Republic) D Šalková | 3 | 3
2 | (Czech Republic) L Nosková | 6 | 6

Third round
8 | (Slovakia) R Šramková | 6 | 3 | 6
9 | (United States) F Di Lorenzo | 3 | 6 | 2
WC | (Czech Republic) L Havlíčková | 3 | 6 | 1
2 | (Czech Republic) L Nosková | 6 | 3 | 6

Quarterfinals
8 | (Slovakia) R Šramková | 3 | 6 | 6
2 | (Czech Republic) L Nosková | 6 | 4 | 4
