= 2023 Agel Říčany Open – Doubles =

Doubles
- 2023 Agel Říčany Open

Final
- Champions: (Czech Republic) Karolína Kubáňová (Czech Republic) Aneta Kučmová
- Runners-up: (Slovenia) Veronika Erjavec (Czech Republic) Dominika Šalková
- Score: 4–6, 6–3, [10–4]

Events
| Singles | Doubles |
| ← 2018 · | Agel Říčany Open | · 2024 → |

Karolína Kubáňová and Nikola Tomanová were the defending champions but Tomanová chose not to participate.

Kubáňová partnered alongside Aneta Kučmová and successfully defended her title, defeating Veronika Erjavec and Dominika Šalková in the final, 4–6, 6–3, [10–4].

== Seeds ==
1. (Slovenia) Veronika Erjavec / (Czech Republic) Dominika Šalková (final)
2. Amina Anshba / (Brazil) Laura Pigossi (first round)
3. (Slovenia) Nika Radišić / (United States) Sofia Sewing (first round)
4. (United States) Hailey Baptiste / (United States) Whitney Osuigwe (withdrew)

== Draw ==
Key

- Q = Qualifier
- WC = Wild card
- LL = Lucky loser
- Alt = Alternate
- ITF = ITF entry
- PR = Protected ranking
- SR = Special ranking
- SE = Special exempt
- JE = Junior exempt
- JR = Junior Accelerator Programme entrant
- CO = College Accelerator Programme entrant
- NG = Next Gen Accelerator Program entrant
- w/o = Walkover
- r = Retired
- d = Defaulted

First round
1 | (Slovenia) V Erjavec (Czech Republic) D Šalková | 6 | 6
(Germany) L Meyer auf der Heide (United States) C Scholl | 2 | 3
(Czech Republic) M Bayerlová (Czech Republic) J Štruplová | 6^{3} | 6 | [8]
(Slovenia) N Potočnik (Egypt) S Samir | 7^{7} | 2 | [10]
Alt | (Germany) M Guth (Germany) A Wirges | 6 | 6
(Czech Republic) A Laboutková (Czech Republic) I Šebestová | 3 | 4
WC | (Czech Republic) K Kajabová (Czech Republic) T Poláková | 3 | 4
(Australia) S Mendez (Greece) D Papamichail | 6 | 6
(Czech Republic) K Kubáňová (Czech Republic) A Kučmová | 7^{7} | 2 | [10]
(Czech Republic) D Hindová (Czech Republic) T Smitková | 6^{2} | 6 | [6]
WC | (Czech Republic) M Smékalová (Czech Republic) T Valentová | 4 | 6 | [10]
3 | (Slovenia) N Radišić (United States) S Sewing | 6 | 2 | [6]
WC | (Czech Republic) K Hajná (Czech Republic) B Slavíková | 3 | 3
K Laskutova (Hungary) AK Tóth | 6 | 6
(Italy) M Colmegna (Germany) A Klasen | 7 | 4 | [11]
2 | A Anshba (Brazil) L Pigossi | 5 | 6 | [9]

Quarterfinals
1 | (Slovenia) V Erjavec (Czech Republic) D Šalková | w/o
(Slovenia) N Potočnik (Egypt) S Samir
Alt | (Germany) M Guth (Germany) A Wirges | 6 | 3 | [4]
(Australia) S Mendez (Greece) D Papamichail | 1 | 6 | [10]
(Czech Republic) K Kubáňová (Czech Republic) A Kučmová | 6 | 2 | [10]
WC | (Czech Republic) M Smékalová (Czech Republic) T Valentová | 4 | 6 | [7]
K Laskutova (Hungary) AK Tóth | 2 | 3
(Italy) M Colmegna (Germany) A Klasen | 6 | 6

Semifinals
1 | (Slovenia) V Erjavec (Czech Republic) D Šalková | 4 | 6 | [10]
(Australia) S Mendez (Greece) D Papamichail | 6 | 1 | [4]
(Czech Republic) K Kubáňová (Czech Republic) A Kučmová | 6 | 6
(Italy) M Colmegna (Germany) A Klasen | 1 | 4

Final
1 | (Slovenia) V Erjavec (Czech Republic) D Šalková | 6 | 3 | [4]
(Czech Republic) K Kubáňová (Czech Republic) A Kučmová | 4 | 6 | [10]
