= 2024 Macha Lake Open – Doubles =

Doubles
- 2024 Macha Lake Open

Final
- Champions: (Poland) Maja Chwalińska (Czech Republic) Anastasia Dețiuc
- Runners-up: (China) Feng Shuo (Greece) Sapfo Sakellaridi
- Score: 6–3, 2–6, [10–6]

Events
Singles	Doubles
← 2022 ·	Macha Lake Open	· 2025 →

Karolína Kubáňová and Aneta Kučmová were the defending champions, but lost in the quarterfinals to Yvonne Cavallé Reimers and María Paulina Pérez.

Maja Chwalińska and Anastasia Dețiuc won the title, defeating Feng Shuo and Sapfo Sakellaridi in the final; 6–3, 2–6, [10–6].

== Seeds ==
1. (Ukraine) Valeriya Strakhova / (China) Tang Qianhui (quarterfinals)
2. (United States) Jessie Aney / (Germany) Lena Papadakis (first round)
3. (Poland) Maja Chwalińska / (Czech Republic) Anastasia Dețiuc (champions)
4. (China) Feng Shuo / (Greece) Sapfo Sakellaridi (final)

== Draw ==
=== Key ===
- Q = Qualifier
- WC = Wild card
- LL = Lucky loser
- Alt = Alternate
- SE = Special exempt
- PR = Protected ranking
- ITF = ITF entry
- JE = Junior exempt
- w/o = Walkover
- r = Retired
- d = Defaulted
- SR = Special ranking

First round
1	(Ukraine) V Strakhova (China) Q Tang	6	6
(Latvia) D Marcinkēviča (Georgia (country)) S Shapatava	2	1
(Czech Republic) M Bayerlová (Bulgaria) L Karatancheva	4	4
(Czech Republic) D Hindová (Czech Republic) T Valentová	6	6
3	(Poland) M Chwalińska (Czech Republic) A Dețiuc	6	6
WC	(Czech Republic) A Dvořáčková (Czech Republic) L Šafářová	1	2
(Greece) M Matoula (Slovakia) M Okáľová	6	2	[10]
WC	(Czech Republic) K Mandelíková (Czech Republic) L Urbanová	4	6	[3]
WC	(Czech Republic) A Kovačková (Czech Republic) L Samson	6	6
(Finland) L Hietaranta; E Pridankina	4	2
(Serbia) L Radivojević (Bulgaria) I Shinikova	3	2
4	(China) S Feng (Greece) S Sakellaridi	6	6
(Spain) Y Cavallé Reimers (Colombia) MP Pérez	6	6
(Australia) A Osborne (Czech Republic) J Štruplová	4	4
(Czech Republic) K Kubáňová (Czech Republic) A Kučmová	6	6
2	(United States) J Aney (Germany) L Papadakis	4	4

Quarterfinals
1	(Ukraine) V Strakhova (China) Q Tang	0	6^{5}
(Czech Republic) D Hindová (Czech Republic) T Valentová	6	7^{7}
3	(Poland) M Chwalińska (Czech Republic) A Dețiuc	7^{7}	7^{9}
(Greece) M Matoula (Slovakia) M Okáľová	6^{5}	6^{7}
WC	(Czech Republic) A Kovačková (Czech Republic) L Samson	2	4
4	(China) S Feng (Greece) S Sakellaridi	6	6
(Spain) Y Cavallé Reimers (Colombia) MP Pérez	7	6
(Czech Republic) K Kubáňová (Czech Republic) A Kučmová	5	4

Semifinals
(Czech Republic) D Hindová (Czech Republic) T Valentová	6^{5}	4
3	(Poland) M Chwalińska (Czech Republic) A Dețiuc	7^{7}	6
4	(China) S Feng (Greece) S Sakellaridi	6	6
(Spain) Y Cavallé Reimers (Colombia) MP Pérez	0	1

Final
3	(Poland) M Chwalińska (Czech Republic) A Dețiuc	6	2	[10]
4	(China) S Feng (Greece) S Sakellaridi	3	6	[6]
