= 2024 Macha Lake Open =

Tennis tournament

- Date: 24–30 June 2024
- Edition: 21st
- Category: ITF Women's World Tennis Tour
- Prize money: $60,000
- Surface: Clay / Outdoor
- Location: Staré Splavy, Czech Republic

Champions

Singles
- (Czech Republic) Tereza Valentová

Doubles
- (Poland) Maja Chwalińska / (Czech Republic) Anastasia Dețiuc
- Macha Lake Open

The 2024 Macha Lake Open was a professional tennis tournament that was played on outdoor clay courts. It was the twenty-first leg of the tournament, which was part of the 2024 ITF Women's World Tennis Tour. It took place in Staré Splavy, Czech Republic, between 24 and 30 June 2024.

== Champions ==
=== Singles ===
- (Czech Republic) Tereza Valentová def. (Czech Republic) Aneta Kučmová, 6–3, 7–5

=== Doubles ===
- (Poland) Maja Chwalińska / (Czech Republic) Anastasia Dețiuc def. (China) Feng Shuo / (Greece) Sapfo Sakellaridi, 6–3, 2–6, [10–6]

== Singles main draw entrants ==
=== Seeds ===
Country	Player	Rank	Seed
FRA	Amandine Hesse	243	1
POL	Maja Chwalińska	245	2
AND	Victoria Jiménez Kasintseva	247	3
LIE	Kathinka von Deichmann	249	4
BUL	Isabella Shinikova	250	5
KOR	Jang Su-jeong	254	6
ESP	Guiomar Maristany	257	7
GRE	Sapfo Sakellaridi	263	8

- Rankings are as of 17 June 2024.

=== Other entrants ===
The following players received wildcards into the singles main draw:

- (Czech Republic) Alena Kovačková
- (Czech Republic) Lucie Šafářová
- (Czech Republic) Laura Samson
- (Czech Republic) Tereza Valentová

The following player received entry into the singles main draw using a special ranking:

- Kristina Dmitruk

The following player received entry into the singles main draw through a special exempt:

- (Turkey) Berfu Cengiz

The following players received entry from the qualifying draw:

- (United States) Jessie Aney
- (Spain) Ariana Geerlings
- (Bulgaria) Lia Karatancheva
- (Netherlands) Anouk Koevermans
- (Czech Republic) Aneta Kučmová
- (United States) Katrina Scott
- (Latvia) Daniela Vismane
- (Germany) Stephanie Wagner
