= 2022 Macha Lake Open =

Tennis tournament

- Date: 13–19 June 2022
- Edition: 20th
- Category: ITF Women's World Tennis Tour
- Prize money: $60,000
- Surface: Clay / Outdoor
- Location: Česká Lípa, Czech Republic

Champions

Singles
- (Czech Republic) Sára Bejlek

Doubles
- (Czech Republic) Karolína Kubáňová / (Czech Republic) Aneta Kučmová
- Macha Lake Open

The 2022 Macha Lake Open was a professional tennis tournament played on outdoor clay courts. It was the twentieth edition of the tournament which was part of the 2022 ITF Women's World Tennis Tour. It took place in Česká Lípa, Czech Republic between 13 and 19 June 2022.

== Champions ==
=== Singles ===
- (Czech Republic) Sára Bejlek def. (Czech Republic) Jesika Malečková, 6–4, 6–4

=== Doubles ===
- (Czech Republic) Karolína Kubáňová / (Czech Republic) Aneta Kučmová def. (Italy) Nuria Brancaccio / (Greece) Despina Papamichail, 6–2, 7–6^{(11–9)}

== Singles main draw entrants ==
=== Seeds ===
Country	Player	Rank^{1}	Seed
HUN	Panna Udvardy	98	1
CZE	Linda Nosková	139	2
GRE	Despina Papamichail	163	3
MEX	Renata Zarazúa	169	4
LIE	Kathinka von Deichmann	183	5
ARG	María Lourdes Carlé	186	6
BRA	Carolina Alves	201	7
SVK	Rebecca Šramková	231	8
USA	Francesca Di Lorenzo	245	9
CZE	Jesika Malečková	251	10
SUI	Conny Perrin	265	11
CZE	Sára Bejlek	266	12
MKD	Lina Gjorcheska	281	13
ESP	Irene Burillo Escorihuela	286	14
CZE	Tereza Smitková	290	15
ROU	Andreea Prisăcariu	314	16

- ^{1} Rankings are as of 6 June 2022.

=== Other entrants ===
The following players received wildcards into the singles main draw:

- (Czech Republic) Lucie Havlíčková
- (Czech Republic) Linda Klimovičová
- (Czech Republic) Amélie Šmejkalová
- (Czech Republic) Julie Štruplová
- (Czech Republic) Karolína Vlčková

The following players received entry from the qualifying draw:

- (Slovakia) Bianca Behúlová
- (Czech Republic) Nikola Břečková
- (Slovakia) Nikola Daubnerová
- (Czech Republic) Denisa Hindová
- (Czech Republic) Karolína Kubáňová
- (Slovakia) Eszter Méri
- (Germany) Luisa Meyer auf der Heide
- (Italy) Aurora Zantedeschi

The following players received entry as lucky losers:

- (Czech Republic) Denise Hrdinková
- (Slovakia) Timea Jarušková
