= 2023 Agel Říčany Open =

Tennis tournament

- Date: 12–18 June 2023
- Edition: 4th
- Category: ITF Women's World Tennis Tour
- Prize money: $60,000
- Surface: Clay / Outdoor
- Location: Říčany, Czech Republic

Champions

Singles
- (United States) Elvina Kalieva

Doubles
- (Czech Republic) Karolína Kubáňová / (Czech Republic) Aneta Kučmová
- Agel Říčany Open

The 2023 Agel Říčany Open was a professional tennis tournament played on outdoor clay courts. It was the fourth edition of the tournament, which was part of the 2023 ITF Women's World Tennis Tour. It took place in Říčany, Czech Republic, between 12 and 18 June 2023.

== Champions ==
=== Singles ===
- (United States) Elvina Kalieva def. (Japan) Misaki Doi, 7–6^{(7–2)}, 6–0

=== Doubles ===
- (Czech Republic) Karolína Kubáňová / (Czech Republic) Aneta Kučmová def. (Slovenia) Veronika Erjavec / (Czech Republic) Dominika Šalková, 4–6, 6–3, [10–4]

== Singles main draw entrants ==
=== Seeds ===
Country	Player	Rank	Seed
BRA	Laura Pigossi	139	1
HUN	Réka Luca Jani	148	2
GRE	Despina Papamichail	158	3
MKD	Lina Gjorcheska	230	4
~~ROU~~	~~Miriam Bulgaru~~	~~238~~	~~5~~
USA	Hailey Baptiste	243	6
SLO	Veronika Erjavec	250	7
USA	Elvina Kalieva	270	8
SLO	Nina Potočnik	287	9
CZE	Dominika Šalková	298	10
JPN	Misaki Doi	309	11
USA	Whitney Osuigwe	319	12
CZE	Michaela Bayerlová	323	13
AUS	Seone Mendez	343	14
CZE	Tereza Smitková	347	15
CZE	Nikola Bartůňková	350	16

- Rankings are as of 29 May 2023.

=== Other entrants ===
The following players received wildcards into the singles main draw:

- (Czech Republic) Denisa Hindová
- (Czech Republic) Magdaléna Smékalová
- (Czech Republic) Kristýna Tomajková
- (Czech Republic) Lucie Urbanová
- (Czech Republic) Tereza Valentová

The following player received entry into the singles main draw using a special ranking:

- Alina Charaeva

The following players received entry from the qualifying draw:

- (Germany) Sina Herrmann
- (Czech Republic) Denise Hrdinková
- (Switzerland) Leonie Küng
- (Slovakia) Sofia Milatová
- (Slovenia) Nika Radišić
- (Italy) Miriana Tona
- (Hungary) Amarissa Kiara Tóth
- (Germany) Angelina Wirges

The following player received entry as a lucky loser:

- Polina Leykina
