= Agel Říčany Open =

- 2023 Agel Říčany Open

ITF Women's Tour
- Event name: Agel Říčany Open (2023–); Penta Trading Open (2016–18)
- Location: Říčany, Czech Republic
- Venue: Oáza Říčany
- Category: ITF Women's World Tennis Tour
- Surface: Clay
- Draw: 32S/32Q/16D
- Prize money: $60,000

The Agel Říčany Open is a tournament for professional female tennis players played on outdoor clay courts. The event is classified as a $60,000 ITF Women's World Tennis Tour tournament and has been held in Říčany, Czech Republic, since 2016.

== Past finals ==
=== Singles ===
Year	Champion	Runner-up	Score
2023	(United States) Elvina Kalieva	(Japan) Misaki Doi	7–6^{(7–2)}, 6–0
2019–22	Not held		
2018	(Czech Republic) Vendula Žovincová	(Germany) Julyette Steur	6–3, 6–7^{(2–7)}, 7–6^{(7–0)}
2017	(Czech Republic) Tereza Procházková	(Czech Republic) Diana Šumová	5–7, 6–4, 6–4
2016	(Germany) Katharina Gerlach	(Czech Republic) Miriam Kolodziejová	7–5, 6–2

=== Doubles ===
Year	Champions	Runners-up	Score
2023	(Czech Republic) Karolína Kubáňová (Czech Republic) Aneta Kučmová	(Slovenia) Veronika Erjavec (Czech Republic) Dominika Šalková	4–6, 6–3, [10–4]
2019–22	Not held		
2018	(Czech Republic) Karolína Kubáňová (Czech Republic) Nikola Tomanová	(Germany) Julyette Steur (Czech Republic) Vendula Žovincová	6–7^{(2–7)}, 6–4, [11–9]
2017	(Slovakia) Jana Jablonovská (Slovakia) Natália Vajdová	(Czech Republic) Karolína Beránková (Czech Republic) Veronika Vlkovská	6–1, 6–3
2016	(Czech Republic) Nikola Novotná (Czech Republic) Nikola Tomanová	(Czech Republic) Aneta Kladivová (Czech Republic) Sonja Křtěnová	6–1, 6–0
