= 2023 Agel Říčany Open – Singles =

Singles
- 2023 Agel Říčany Open

Final
- Champion: (United States) Elvina Kalieva
- Runner-up: (Japan) Misaki Doi
- Score: 7–6^{(7–2)}, 6–0

Events
Singles	Doubles
← 2018 ·	Agel Říčany Open	· 2024 →

Vendula Žovincová was the defending champion but chose not to participate.

Elvina Kalieva won the title, defeating Misaki Doi in the final, 7–6^{(7–2)}, 6–0.

== Seeds ==
All seeds receive a bye into the second round.

1. (Brazil) Laura Pigossi (quarterfinals)
2. (Hungary) Réka Luca Jani (third round)
3. (Greece) Despina Papamichail (third round)
4. (North Macedonia) Lina Gjorcheska (third round)
5. (Romania) Miriam Bulgaru (withdrew)
6. (United States) Hailey Baptiste (second round)
7. (Slovenia) Veronika Erjavec (quarterfinals)
8. (United States) Elvina Kalieva (champion)
9. (Slovenia) Nina Potočnik (second round, retired)
10. (Czech Republic) Dominika Šalková (second round)
11. (Japan) Misaki Doi (final)
12. (United States) Whitney Osuigwe (second round)
13. (Czech Republic) Michaela Bayerlová (second round)
14. (Australia) Seone Mendez (quarterfinals)
15. (Czech Republic) Tereza Smitková (second round)
16. (Czech Republic) Nikola Bartůňková (second round)

== Draw ==
Key

- Q = Qualifier
- WC = Wild card
- LL = Lucky loser
- Alt = Alternate
- ITF = ITF entry
- PR = Protected ranking
- SR = Special ranking
- SE = Special exempt
- JE = Junior exempt
- JR = Junior Accelerator Programme entrant
- CO = College Accelerator Programme entrant
- NG = Next Gen Accelerator Program entrant
- w/o = Walkover
- r = Retired
- d = Defaulted

=== Finals ===
Quarterfinals
1	(Brazil) Laura Pigossi	3	2
WC	(Czech Republic) Tereza Valentová	6	6
14	(Australia) Seone Mendez	3	6^{6}
8	(United States) Elvina Kalieva	6	7^{8}
7	(Slovenia) Veronika Erjavec	6^{6}	2
(Romania) Gabriela Lee	7^{8}	6
11	(Japan) Misaki Doi	6	6
(Czech Republic) Aneta Kučmová	2	4

Semifinals
WC	(Czech Republic) Tereza Valentová	5	2
8	(United States) Elvina Kalieva	7	6
(Romania) Gabriela Lee	5	5
11	(Japan) Misaki Doi	7	7

Final
8	(United States) Elvina Kalieva	7^{7}	6
11	(Japan) Misaki Doi	6^{2}	0

=== Top half ===
==== Section 1 ====
First round
WC	(Czech Republic) K Tomajková	5	1
(Egypt) S Samir	7	6
(Slovakia) K Kužmová	6	4	5
Q	(Hungary) AK Tóth	3	6	7
(Romania) I Amariei	2^{r}
WC	(Czech Republic) T Valentová	5
Q	(Italy) M Tona	6	6
Q	(Germany) S Herrmann	4	3

Second round
1	(Brazil) L Pigossi	7	6
(Egypt) S Samir	5	0
Q	(Hungary) AK Tóth	7^{7}	4	7^{8}
13	(Czech Republic) M Bayerlová	6^{3}	6	6^{6}
12	(United States) W Osuigwe	5	0
WC	(Czech Republic) T Valentová	7	6
Q	(Italy) M Tona	6	6
6	(United States) H Baptiste	4	2

Third round
1	(Brazil) L Pigossi	7	6
Q	(Hungary) AK Tóth	5	3
WC	(Czech Republic) T Valentová	6	6
Q	(Italy) M Tona	2	2

Quarterfinals
1	(Brazil) L Pigossi	3	2
WC	(Czech Republic) T Valentová	6	6

==== Section 2 ====
First round
WC	(Czech Republic) M Smékalová	3	7^{7}	3
A Anshba	6	6^{5}	6
(United States) S Sewing	4	7	2
Q	(Switzerland) L Küng	6	5	6
Q	(Slovenia) N Radišić	4	6	6
(Czech Republic) A Laboutková	6	1	3
K Laskutova	4	4
(United States) C Scholl	6	6

Second round
3	(Greece) D Papamichail	6	6
A Anshba	2	3
Q	(Switzerland) L Küng	4	4
14	(Australia) S Mendez	6	6
9	(Slovenia) N Potočnik	1	2^{r}
Q	(Slovenia) N Radišić	6	2
(United States) C Scholl	2	4
8	(United States) E Kalieva	6	6

Third round
3	(Greece) D Papamichail	2	7	3
14	(Australia) S Mendez	6	5	6
Q	(Slovenia) N Radišić	2	6	3
8	(United States) E Kalieva	6	2	6

Quarterfinals
14	(Australia) S Mendez	3	6^{6}
8	(United States) E Kalieva	6	7^{8}

=== Bottom half ===
==== Section 3 ====
First round
(Germany) K Kanev	6^{2}	4
(Czech Republic) L Klimovičová	7^{7}	6
Q	(Czech Republic) D Hrdinková	2	6	5
(Czech Republic) J Štruplová	6	0	7
SR	A Charaeva	2	7^{7}	3
(Romania) G Lee	6	6^{4}	6
Q	(Germany) A Wirges	1	6	6
WC	(Czech Republic) L Urbanová	6	4	4

Second round
7	(Slovenia) V Erjavec	6	6
(Czech Republic) L Klimovičová	2	1
(Czech Republic) J Štruplová	7	5	6
10	(Czech Republic) D Šalková	5	7	1
16	(Czech Republic) N Bartůňková	2	4
(Romania) G Lee	6	6
Q	(Germany) A Wirges	4	2
4	(North Macedonia) L Gjorcheska	6	6

Third round
7	(Slovenia) V Erjavec	6	6
(Czech Republic) J Štruplová	4	4
(Romania) G Lee	7^{7}	6
4	(North Macedonia) L Gjorcheska	6^{4}	4

Quarterfinals
7	(Slovenia) V Erjavec	6^{6}	2
(Romania) G Lee	7^{8}	6

==== Section 4 ====
First round
(Germany) M Guth	6^{4}	6	7
(Germany) Jo Steur	7^{7}	4	5
WC	(Czech Republic) D Hindová	7	3	4
(Germany) L Meyer auf der Heide	5	6	6
(Czech Republic) A Kučmová	6	6
(Italy) M Colmegna	4	0
Q	(Slovakia) S Milatová	6	6
(Slovakia) R Zelníčková	4	2

Second round
LL	P Leykina	3	0
(Germany) M Guth	6	6
(Germany) L Meyer auf der Heide	3	3
11	(Japan) M Doi	6	6
15	(Czech Republic) T Smitková	3	6	2
(Czech Republic) A Kučmová	6	4	6
Q	(Slovakia) S Milatová	4	5
2	(Hungary) RL Jani	6	7

Third round
(Germany) M Guth	3	2
11	(Japan) M Doi	6	6
(Czech Republic) A Kučmová	6	6
2	(Hungary) RL Jani	1	0

Quarterfinals
11	(Japan) M Doi	6	6
(Czech Republic) A Kučmová	2	4
