= 2022 Macha Lake Open – Doubles =

Doubles
- 2022 Macha Lake Open

Final
- Champions: (Czech Republic) Karolína Kubáňová (Czech Republic) Aneta Kučmová
- Runners-up: (Italy) Nuria Brancaccio (Greece) Despina Papamichail
- Score: 6–2, 7–6^{(11–9)}

Events
Singles	Doubles
← 2021 ·	Macha Lake Open	· 2024 →

Valentini Grammatikopoulou and Richèl Hogenkamp were the defending champions but chose not to participate.

Karolína Kubáňová and Aneta Kučmová won the title, defeating Nuria Brancaccio and Despina Papamichail in the final, 6–2, 7–6^{(11–9)}.

== Seeds ==
1. (Czech Republic) Linda Nosková / (Mexico) Renata Zarazúa (quarterfinals)
2. (Switzerland) Conny Perrin / (India) Prarthana Thombare (first round)
3. (Italy) Nuria Brancaccio / (Greece) Despina Papamichail (final)
4. (United States) Francesca Di Lorenzo / (Hungary) Panna Udvardy (first round)

== Draw ==
=== Key ===
- Q = Qualifier
- WC = Wild card
- LL = Lucky loser
- Alt = Alternate
- SE = Special exempt
- PR = Protected ranking
- ITF = ITF entry
- JE = Junior exempt
- w/o = Walkover
- r = Retired
- d = Defaulted
- SR = Special ranking

=== Draw ===
First round
1	(Czech Republic) L Nosková (Mexico) R Zarazúa	6	6
(Japan) N Hanatani (Japan) K Morisaki	1	3
WC	(Czech Republic) L Klimovičová (Czech Republic) D Šalková	7^{7}	2	[10]
(Czech Republic) D Hindová (Czech Republic) D Viďmanová	6^{2}	6	[8]
4	(United States) F Di Lorenzo (Hungary) P Udvardy	2	6	[5]
(Czech Republic) N Bartůňková (Czech Republic) J Marková	6	4	[10]
(Germany) T Morderger (Germany) Y Morderger	3	1
(Czech Republic) K Kubáňová (Czech Republic) A Kučmová	6	6
(Italy) M Colmegna (Colombia) Y Lizarazo	4	2
WC	(Czech Republic) A Laboutková (Czech Republic) B Palicová	6	6
(Italy) A Turati (Italy) B Turati	6	1	[7]
3	(Italy) N Brancaccio (Greece) D Papamichail	3	6	[10]
(Slovenia) N Potočnik (Italy) A Zantedeschi	3	7	[4]
A Komardina; E Makarova	6	5	[10]
WC	(Czech Republic) S Bejlek (Czech Republic) L Havlíčková	6	7^{7}
2	(Switzerland) C Perrin (India) P Thombare	2	6^{5}

Quarterfinals
1	(Czech Republic) L Nosková (Mexico) R Zarazúa	2	2
WC	(Czech Republic) L Klimovičová (Czech Republic) D Šalková	6	6
(Czech Republic) N Bartůňková (Czech Republic) J Marková	2	5
(Czech Republic) K Kubáňová (Czech Republic) A Kučmová	6	7
WC	(Czech Republic) A Laboutková (Czech Republic) B Palicová	2	5
3	(Italy) N Brancaccio (Greece) D Papamichail	6	7
A Komardina; E Makarova	7^{10}	6^{5}	[6]
WC	(Czech Republic) S Bejlek (Czech Republic) L Havlíčková	6^{8}	7^{7}	[10]

Semifinals
WC	(Czech Republic) L Klimovičová (Czech Republic) D Šalková	5	6^{8}
(Czech Republic) K Kubáňová (Czech Republic) A Kučmová	7	7^{10}
3	(Italy) N Brancaccio (Greece) D Papamichail	w/o
WC	(Czech Republic) S Bejlek (Czech Republic) L Havlíčková

Final
(Czech Republic) K Kubáňová (Czech Republic) A Kučmová	6	7^{11}
3	(Italy) N Brancaccio (Greece) D Papamichail	2	6^{9}
