= 2024 Macha Lake Open – Singles =

Singles
- 2024 Macha Lake Open

Final
- Champion: (Czech Republic) Tereza Valentová
- Runner-up: (Czech Republic) Aneta Kučmová
- Score: 6–3, 7–5

Events
Singles	Doubles
← 2022 ·	Macha Lake Open	· 2025 →

Sára Bejlek was the defending champion but chose to compete in Wimbledon qualifying instead.

Tereza Valentová won the title, defeating Aneta Kučmová in the final; 6–3, 7–5.

== Seeds ==
1. (France) Amandine Hesse (first round)
2. (Poland) Maja Chwalińska (quarterfinals)
3. (Andorra) Victoria Jiménez Kasintseva (quarterfinals)
4. (Liechtenstein) Kathinka von Deichmann (second round)
5. (Bulgaria) Isabella Shinikova (second round)
6. (South Korea) Jang Su-jeong (semifinals)
7. (Spain) Guiomar Maristany (semifinals)
8. (Greece) Sapfo Sakellaridi (first round)

== Draw ==
=== Key ===
- Q = Qualifier
- WC = Wild card
- LL = Lucky loser
- Alt = Alternate
- SE = Special exempt
- PR = Protected ranking
- ITF = ITF entry
- JE = Junior exempt
- w/o = Walkover
- r = Retired
- d = Defaulted
- SR = Special ranking

=== Finals ===
Semifinals
WC	(Czech Republic) Tereza Valentová	4	6	6
6	(South Korea) Jang Su-jeong	6	2	2
Q	(Czech Republic) Aneta Kučmová	7	2	6
7	(Spain) Guiomar Maristany	5	6	4

Final
WC	(Czech Republic) Tereza Valentová	6	7
Q	(Czech Republic) Aneta Kučmová	3	5

=== Top half ===
First round
1	(France) A Hesse	1	5
(United States) A Kiick	6	7
WC	(Czech Republic) T Valentová	6	6
(Ukraine) V Strakhova	1	0
(Czech Republic) B Palicová	6	2	2
(Latvia) D Marcinkēviča	2	6	6
SR	K Dmitruk	6	6
8	(Greece) S Sakellaridi	2	1
3	(Andorra) V Jiménez Kasintseva	2	6	6
Q	(Bulgaria) L Karatancheva	6	3	1
(Netherlands) L Pattinama Kerkhove	7	6
Q	(United States) J Aney	5	3
(Spain) I Burillo Escorihuela	4	2
E Pridankina	6	6
(Romania) G Lee	6	1	4
6	(South Korea) S-j Jang	3	6	6

Second round
(United States) A Kiick	2	3
WC	(Czech Republic) T Valentová	6	6
(Latvia) D Marcinkēviča	6	6^{6}	4
SR	K Dmitruk	3	7^{8}	6
3	(Andorra) V Jiménez Kasintseva	4	6	6
(Netherlands) L Pattinama Kerkhove	6	1	1
E Pridankina	3	4
6	(South Korea) S-j Jang	6	6

Quarterfinals
WC	(Czech Republic) T Valentová	6	6
SR	K Dmitruk	3	2
3	(Andorra) V Jiménez Kasintseva	7	1	3
6	(South Korea) S-j Jang	5	6	6

Semifinals
WC	(Czech Republic) T Valentová	4	6	6
6	(South Korea) S-j Jang	6	2	2

=== Bottom half ===
First round
5	(Bulgaria) I Shinikova	6	6
Q	(Latvia) D Vismane	3	2
(Czech Republic) J Štruplová	2	4
Q	(Czech Republic) A Kučmová	6	6
(Serbia) L Radivojević	7^{7}	0	4
Q	(Netherlands) A Koevermans	6^{4}	6	6
WC	(Czech Republic) L Samson	6	3	2
4	(Liechtenstein) K von Deichmann	4	6	6
7	(Spain) G Maristany	7^{7}	6
WC	(Czech Republic) A Kovačková	6^{5}	2
Q	(Spain) A Geerlings	1	0^{r}
Q	(Germany) S Wagner	6	0
Q	(United States) K Scott	7^{7}	3	6
WC	(Czech Republic) L Šafářová	6^{5}	6	3
SE	(Turkey) B Cengiz	3	6	4
2	(Poland) M Chwalińska	6	3	6

Second round
5	(Bulgaria) I Shinikova	6	0	2
Q	(Czech Republic) A Kučmová	2	6	6
Q	(Netherlands) A Koevermans	6	6
4	(Liechtenstein) K von Deichmann	4	4
7	(Spain) G Maristany	4	6	6
Q	(Germany) S Wagner	6	2	3
Q	(United States) K Scott	1	6	2
2	(Poland) M Chwalińska	6	3	6

Quarterfinals
Q	(Czech Republic) A Kučmová	6	6
Q	(Netherlands) A Koevermans	4	3
7	(Spain) G Maristany	6	7^{7}
2	(Poland) M Chwalińska	3	6^{2}

Semifinals
Q	(Czech Republic) A Kučmová	7	2	6
7	(Spain) G Maristany	5	6	4
