= Macha Lake Open =

- 2024 Macha Lake Open

ITF Women's Tour
- Event name: Macha Lake Open
- Location: Staré Splavy, Czech Republic
- Venue: TO Staré Splavy
- Category: ITF Women's Circuit
- Surface: Clay
- Draw: 32S/32Q/16D
- Prize money: $60,000
- Website: www.machalakeopen.cz

The Macha Lake Open is a tennis tournament of the ITF Women's Circuit played on outdoor clay courts. It has been held in Staré Splavy, Czech Republic, since 1993 and is classified as a $60,000 event.

In 2022, the venue held at Sport Česká Lípa in Česká Lípa.

== Past finals ==
=== Singles ===
Year	Champion	Runner-up	Score
2026	Julia Avdeeva	(Netherlands) Eva Vedder	1–6, 6–3, 6–2
2025	(Czech Republic) Laura Samson	(Brazil) Carolina Alves	2–6, 6–2, 6–3
2024	(Czech Republic) Tereza Valentová	(Czech Republic) Aneta Kučmová	6–3, 7–5
2023	replaced by the 2023 Agel Říčany Open		
2022	(Czech Republic) Sára Bejlek	(Czech Republic) Jesika Malečková	6–4, 6–4
2021	(China) Zheng Qinwen	(Serbia) Aleksandra Krunić	7–6^{(7–5)}, 6–3
2020	cancelled due to the COVID-19 pandemic		
2019	(Czech Republic) Barbora Krejčíková	(Czech Republic) Denisa Allertová	6–2, 6–3
2018	(Czech Republic) Monika Kilnarová	(Slovakia) Rebecca Šramková	7–6^{(7–5)}, 6–3
2017	(Slovakia) Anna Karolína Schmiedlová	(Belarus) Vera Lapko	6–4, 7–5
2008–16	Not held		
2007	(Slovakia) Lenka Wienerová	(Germany) Kristina Steiert	6–4, 6–2
2006	(Czech Republic) Kateřina Vaňková	(Czech Republic) Zuzana Zálabská	6–4, 6–4
2005	(Czech Republic) Petra Novotníková	(Czech Republic) Veronika Raimrová	6–3, 6–3
2004	(Czech Republic) Lucie Hradecká	(Germany) Sabrina Jolk	6–1, 7–6^{(7–3)}
2003	(Slovakia) Dominika Nociarová	(Bulgaria) Antoaneta Pandjerova	6–2, 6–3
2002	(Slovakia) Dominika Nociarová	(Slovakia) Zuzana Zemenová	5–7, 7–5, 6–0
2001	(Czech Republic) Jana Macurová	(Czech Republic) Hana Šromová	6–2, 4–6, 6–3
2000	(Czech Republic) Jitka Schönfeldová	(Czech Republic) Renata Voráčová	6–4, 7–6^{(10–8)}
1999	(Czech Republic) Milena Nekvapilová	(Germany) Veronika Martinek	6–1, 7–6
1998	(Czech Republic) Jana Hlaváčková	(Czech Republic) Milena Nekvapilová	3–6, 6–2, 6–2
1997	(Czech Republic) Kateřina Kroupová	(Czech Republic) Milena Nekvapilová	6–3, 3–6, 7–6
1996	(Slovakia) Eva Šestáková	(Czech Republic) Nikola Hübnerová	7–5, 6–3
1995	(Czech Republic) Libuše Průšová	(Czech Republic) Jana Lubasová	6–0, 6–1
1994	(Czech Republic) Eva Krejčová	(France) Virginie Massart	1–6, 6–0, 6–4
1993	(Czech Republic) Blanka Kumbárová	(Czech Republic) Michaela Kratochvílová	6–0, 7–5

=== Doubles ===
Year	Champions	Runners-up	Score
2026	(Czech Republic) Alena Kovačková (2) (Czech Republic) Jana Kovačková	(United States) Hibah Shaikh (United States) Allura Zamarripa	6–4, 6–1
2025	(Czech Republic) Alena Kovačková (Czech Republic) Ivana Šebestová	(Bulgaria) Lia Karatancheva (Czech Republic) Aneta Kučmová	1–6, 7–5, [10–5]
2024	(Poland) Maja Chwalińska (Czech Republic) Anastasia Dețiuc	(China) Feng Shuo (Greece) Sapfo Sakellaridi	6–3, 2–6, [10–6]
2023	replaced by the 2023 Agel Říčany Open		
2022	(Czech Republic) Karolína Kubáňová (Czech Republic) Aneta Kučmová	(Italy) Nuria Brancaccio (Greece) Despina Papamichail	6–2, 7–6^{(11–9)}
2021	(Greece) Valentini Grammatikopoulou (Netherlands) Richèl Hogenkamp	(Russia) Amina Anshba (Czech Republic) Anastasia Dețiuc	6–3, 6–4
2020	cancelled due to the COVID-19 pandemic		
2019	(Russia) Natela Dzalamidze (Serbia) Nina Stojanović	(Japan) Kyōka Okamura (Serbia) Dejana Radanović	6–3, 6–3
2018	(Russia) Maria Marfutina (Czech Republic) Anastasia Zarycká	(Czech Republic) Johana Marková (Germany) Sarah-Rebecca Sekulic	5–7, 6–1, [10–8]
2017	(Romania) Laura-Ioana Andrei (Czech Republic) Anastasia Zarycká	(Germany) Tayisiya Morderger (Germany) Yana Morderger	6–3, 6–4
2008–16	Not held		
2007	(Czech Republic) Iveta Gerlová (Czech Republic) Lucie Kriegsmannová	(Czech Republic) Hana Birnerová (Slovakia) Monika Kochanová	6–2, 6–1
2006	(Czech Republic) Iveta Gerlová (Czech Republic) Lucie Kriegsmannová	(Czech Republic) Hana Birnerová (Russia) Ksenia Lykina	6–7^{(4–7)}, 6–2, 6–2
2005	(Czech Republic) Iveta Gerlová (Czech Republic) Lucie Kriegsmannová	(Czech Republic) Petra Novotníková (Czech Republic) Veronika Raimrová	4–6, 6–4, 6–2
2004	(Czech Republic) Blanka Kumbárová (Czech Republic) Tereza Szafnerová	(Czech Republic) Jana Děrkasová (Czech Republic) Tereza Hladíková	6–4, 6–4
2003	(Czech Republic) Iveta Gerlová (Czech Republic) Lucie Kriegsmannová	(Czech Republic) Jana Macurová (Czech Republic) Lenka Novotná	7–5, 6–3
2002	(Czech Republic) Eva Erbová (Czech Republic) Lenka Novotná	(Austria) Stefanie Haidner (Czech Republic) Renata Kučerová	7–6^{(7–5)}, 6–0
2001	(Czech Republic) Milena Nekvapilová (Czech Republic) Hana Šromová	(Czech Republic) Olga Blahotová (Czech Republic) Gabriela Navrátilová	2–6, 6–4, 6–1
2000	(Czech Republic) Andrea Plačková (Czech Republic) Paulina Šlitrová	(Czech Republic) Jana Macurová (Czech Republic) Milena Nekvapilová	6–3, 6–4
1999	(Czech Republic) Gabriela Navrátilová (Czech Republic) Milena Nekvapilová	(Australia) Rochelle Rosenfield (Poland) Anna Żarska	2–6, 6–3, 6–4
1998	(Czech Republic) Zuzana Lešenarová (Czech Republic) Lucie Steflova	(Czech Republic) Hana Šromová (Czech Republic) Milena Nekvapilová	6–3, 5–7, 6–2
1997	(Czech Republic) Jana Macurová (Czech Republic) Gabriela Navrátilová	(Czech Republic) Kateřina Kroupová (Czech Republic) Jana Ondrouchová	6–2, 6–2
1996	(Slovakia) Ľudmila Cervanová (Slovakia) Michaela Hašanová	(Czech Republic) Nikola Hübnerová (Czech Republic) Michaela Paštiková	6–7, 7–6, 7–5
1995	(Slovakia) Michaela Hašanová (Slovakia) Martina Nedelková	(Germany) Michaela Kratochvílová (Czech Republic) Petra Kučová	6–3, 5–7, 7–5
1994	(Ukraine) Nelly Barkan (Netherlands) Martine Vosseberg	(Germany) Martina Hautová (Czech Republic) Michaela Kratochvílová	6–4, 6–3
1993	(Czech Republic) Michaela Kratochvílová (Czech Republic) Petra Kučová	(Czech Republic) Dominika Górecka (Czech Republic) Jindra Gabrisova	4–6, 6–2, 7–5
