= Sapfo Sakellaridi =

Greek tennis player (born 2003)

- Country (sports): Greece
- Born: 1 April 2003 (age 23) Athens, Greece
- Height: 1.83 m (6 ft 0 in)
- Plays: Right-handed
- Prize money: $274,351

Singles
- Career record: 457–356
- Career titles: 8 ITF
- Highest ranking: No. 253 (10 June 2024)
- Current ranking: No. 450 (16 November 2026)

Doubles
- Career record: 410–209
- Career titles: 54 ITF
- Highest ranking: No. 116 (31 August 2026)
- Current ranking: No. 134 (16 November 2026)
- Last updated on: 20 November 2026.

Sapfo Sakellaridi (Σαπφώ Σακελλαρίδη; born 1 April 2003) is a Greek tennis player. She has a career-high singles ranking by the WTA of No. 253, achieved on 10 June 2024, and a best doubles ranking of No. 116, reached on 31 August 2026. Sakellaridi has won eight singles titles and 54 doubles titles on the ITF Women's World Tennis Tour.

== Career ==
Her brother Stefanos Sakellaridis is also a tennis player. The pair played representing Greece at the United Cup in Perth, Australia in December 2022 alongside Maria Sakkari and brothers Stefanos Tsitsipas and Petros Tsitsipas. It was the first mixed-gender team event to offer both ATP rankings and WTA rankings points to its players.

Ranked at world No. 442, Sakellaridi was given a wildcard entry to make her WTA Tour main-draw debut at the 2026 Athens Open but she was defeated in the first round by lucky loser Miriana Tona, in a three set match lasting three hours and eight minutes.

== ITF Circuit finals ==
=== Singles: 19 (8 titles, 11 runner-ups) ===
Legend W25/35 tournaments (0–4) W15 tournaments (8–7)	Finals by surface Hard (3–3) Clay (5–8)

Result	W–L	Date	Tournament	Tier	Surface	Opponent	Score
Loss	0–1	Jan 2020	ITF Antalya, Turkey	W15	Clay	(Turkey) Zeynep Sönmez	3–6, 6–2, 3–6
Finalist (Note: The final was abandoned due to poor weather with Sakellaridi leading 3–1. Both players split ranking points and prize money.)	–NP	Jan 2021	ITF Antalya, Turkiye	W15	Clay	(Russia) Julia Avdeeva	cancelled
Loss	0–2	Dec 2021	ITF Giza, Egypt	W15	Hard	(France) Séléna Janicijevic	3–6, 6–2, 2–6
Loss	0–3	Jan 2022	ITF Giza, Egypt	W15	Hard	(Netherlands) Jasmijn Gimbrère	0–6, 3–6
Win	1–3	Jan 2022	ITF Cairo, Egypt	W15	Clay	(United States) Anastasia Nefedova	7–5, 6–3
Win	2–3	Jan 2022	ITF Cairo, Egypt	W15	Clay	(Russia) Anastasia Zolotareva	6–1, 6–4
Loss	2–4	Jan 2022	ITF Cairo, Egypt	W15	Clay	(Russia) Anastasia Zolotareva	6–1, 3–6, 2–6
Win	3–4	Apr 2022	ITF Antalya, Turkiye	W15	Clay	(Italy) Deborah Chiesa	6–4, 6–3
Loss	3–5	Jul 2022	ITF Getxo, Spain	W25	Clay	(France) Séléna Janicijevic	6–4, 4–6, 5–7
Win	4–5	Dec 2022	ITF Monastir, Tunisia	W15	Hard	(Italy) Arianna Zucchini	6–2, 6–2
Loss	4–6	Jul 2023	ITF Périgueux, France	W25	Clay	(Norway) Malene Helgø	3–6, 3–6
Win	5–6	Mar 2024	ITF Heraklion, Greece	W15	Clay	(Slovakia) Sofia Milatová	6–3, 6–3
Loss	5–7	Mar 2024	ITF Santa Margherita di Pula, Italy	W35	Clay	(Switzerland) Leonie Küng	4–6, 6–6
Loss	5–8	Nov 2024	ITF Heraklion, Greece	W15	Clay	(Greece) Dimitra Pavlou	4–6, 4–6
Loss	5–9	Dec 2024	ITF Antalya, Turkiye	W15	Clay	(Germany) Mina Hodzic	2–6, 2–4 ret.
Loss	5–10	May 2025	ITF Warmbad Villach, Austria	W35	Clay	(Germany) Nastasja Schunk	6–0, 3–6, 4–2 ret.
Win	6–10	Nov 2025	ITF Heraklion, Greece	W15	Clay	(Greece) Elena Korokozidi	1–6, 6–4, 6–3
Win	7–10	Dec 2025	ITF Monastir, Tunisia	W15	Hard	(France) Yasmine Mansouri	7–5, 6–2
Win	8–10	Dec 2025	ITF Monastir, Tunisia	W15	Hard	(Switzerland) Chelsea Fontenel	4–6, 6–4, 6–3
Loss	8–11	Feb 2026	ITF Monastir, Tunisia	W15	Hard	(China) Shi Han	4–6, 2–6

=== Doubles: 92 (54 titles, 38 runner-ups) ===
Legend W60/75 tournaments (6–10) W40/50 tournaments (7–5) W25/35 tournaments (24–11) W15 tournaments (17–12)	Finals by surface Hard (18–7) Clay (36–31)

Result	W–L	Date	Tournament	Tier	Surface	Partner	Opponents	Score
Win	1–0	Jan 2020	ITF Antalya, Turkiye	W15	Clay	(Croatia) Oleksandra Oliynykova	(Russia) Vasilisa Aponasenko (Italy) Nicole Fossa Huergo	6–2, 6–2
Win	2–0	Nov 2021	ITF Castellón, Spain	W15	Clay	(Portugal) Inês Murta	(Spain) Alba Carrillo Marín (Germany) Emily Seibold	6–4, 6–4
Win	3–0	Dec 2021	ITF Giza, Egypt	W15	Hard	(China) Youmi Zhuoma	(Kazakhstan) Gozal Ainitdinova (Russia) Anastasia Sukhotina	7–6^{(4)}, 6–3
Loss	3–1	Dec 2021	ITF Giza, Egypt	W15	Hard	(Russia) Maria Sholokhova	(Oman) Fatma Al-Nabhani (Netherlands) Jasmijn Gimbrère	6–2, 3–6, [5–10]
Win	4–1	Dec 2021	ITF Giza, Egypt	W15	Hard	(China) Youmi Zhuoma	(Netherlands) Jasmijn Gimbrère (Japan) Lisa Marie Rioux	7–5, 6–3
Loss	4–2	Jan 2022	ITF Cairo, Egypt	W15	Clay	(China) Youmi Zhuoma	(Russia) Mariia Tkacheva (Russia) Anastasia Zolotareva	1–6, 4–6
Win	5–2	Feb 2022	ITF Sharm El Sheikh, Egypt	W25	Hard	(Hong Kong) Cody Wong	(Belarus) Yuliya Hatouka (Russia) Anastasia Zakharova	7–5, 4–6, [10–6]
Loss	5–3	Mar 2022	ITF Antalya, Turkiye	W15	Clay	Anastasia Zolotareva	(Czech Republic) Miriam Škoch (Czech Republic) Jesika Malečková	2–6, 4–6
Loss	5–4	Mar 2022	ITF Antalya, Turkiye	W15	Clay	Anastasia Zolotareva	Ksenia Laskutova (Hungary) Amarissa Tóth	6–7^{(4)}, 6–1, [7–10]
Loss	5–5	Apr 2022	ITF Antalya, Turkiye	W15	Clay	Julia Avdeeva	Vlada Koval; Daria Lodikova	4–6, 6–3, [4–10]
Loss	5–6	Apr 2022	ITF Antalya, Turkiye	W15	Clay	Ksenia Laskutova	Vlada Koval (Bulgaria) Gergana Topalova	6–7^{(9)}, 2–6
Loss	5–7	Jul 2022	ITF Getxo, Spain	W25	Clay	(South Korea) Park So-hyun	(Spain) Jéssica Bouzas Maneiro (Spain) Leyre Romero Gormaz	5–7, 0–6
Win	6–7	Oct 2022	ITF Santa Margherita di Pula, Italy	W25	Clay	(United States) Jessie Aney	(Italy) Camilla Rosatello (Italy) Aurora Zantedeschi	7–6^{(1)}, 6–4
Loss	6–8	Oct 2022	ITF Santa Margherita di Pula	W25	Clay	(United States) Jessie Aney	(Italy) Angelica Moratelli (Italy) Camilla Rosatello	7–6^{(4)}, 5–7, [5–10]
Win	7–8	Oct 2022	ITF Santa Margherita di Pula	W25	Clay	(United States) Jessie Aney	(Italy) Nuria Brancaccio (Italy) Angelica Moratelli	7–6^{(2)}, 7–5
Win	8–8	Nov 2022	ITF Heraklion, Greece	W15	Clay	(Romania) Simona Ogescu	(Latvia) Margarita Ignatjeva (Greece) Elena Korokozidi	6–4, 6–3
Win	9–8	Nov 2022	ITF Ortisei, Italy	W25	Hard (i)	Ekaterina Ovcharenko	(Mexico) Fernanda Navarro (United States) Taylor Ng	6–2, 6–4
Win	10–8	Dec 2022	ITF Monastir, Tunisia	W25	Hard	(Romania) Oana Gavrilă	(Italy) Diletta Cherubini (Denmark) Olga Helmi	6–1, 6–1
Win	11–8	Dec 2022	ITF Monastir, Tunisia	W25	Hard	(United States) Chiara Scholl	(United Kingdom) Emilie Lindh (Japan) Eri Shimizu	6–3, 6–3
Win	12–8	Dec 2022	ITF Monastir, Tunisia	W15	Hard	(Greece) Magdalini Adaloglou	(Tunisia) Chiraz Bechri; Milana Zhabrailova	7–5, 6–4
Loss	12–9	Jan 2023	ITF Monastir, Tunisia	W40	Hard	(Romania) Oana Gavrilă	Alena Fomina-Klotz; Iryna Shymanovich	2–6, 1–6
Win	13–9	Jan 2023	ITF Monastir, Tunisia	W25	Hard	(Romania) Oana Gavrilă	(Japan) Miho Kuramochi (Chinese Taipei) Tsao Chia-yi	7–5, 4–6, [10–6]
Loss	13–10	Mar 2023	Trnava Indoor, Slovakia	W60	Hard (i)	(Slovakia) Radka Zelníčková	(Belgium) Greet Minnen (Belgium) Yanina Wickmayer	4–6, 4–6
Loss	13–11	Apr 2023	ITF Santa Margherita di Pula, Italy	W25	Clay	(Kazakhstan) Zhibek Kulambayeva	(Croatia) Mariana Dražić; Anastasia Gasanova	5–7, 4–6
Win	14–11	May 2023	ITF Santa Margherita di Pula	W25	Clay	(Romania) Oana Gavrilă	(Netherlands) Lexie Stevens (Bosnia and Herzegovina) Anita Wagner	6–1, 6–1
Loss	14–12	Jun 2023	Internazionali di Roma, Italy	W60	Clay	(Romania) Oana Gavrilă	(Italy) Angelica Moratelli (Italy) Camilla Rosatello	6–3, 0–6, [7–10]
Win	15–12	Jul 2023	ITF Périgueux, France	W25	Clay	(Czech Republic) Anna Sisková	(Indonesia) Jessy Rompies (Australia) Olivia Tjandramulia	6–2, 6–1
Win	16–12	Aug 2023	Přerov Cup, Czech Republic	W60	Clay	(Czech Republic) Anna Sisková	(Italy) Angelica Moratelli (Italy) Camilla Rosatello	6–2, 6–3
Loss	16–13	Oct 2023	ITF Seville, Spain	W25	Clay	(Romania) Cristina Dinu	(Ukraine) Maryna Kolb (Ukraine) Nadiia Kolb	1–6, 1–6
Loss	16–14	Oct 2023	ITF Faro, Portugal	W25	Hard	(Latvia) Diāna Marcinkēviča	(Ukraine) Maryna Kolb (Ukraine) Nadiia Kolb	4–6, 3–6
Loss	16–15	Oct 2023	ITF Heraklion, Greece	W40	Clay	(Romania) Oana Gavrilă	(Romania) Irina Bara (Slovenia) Dalila Jakupović	6–3, 6–7^{(6)}, [8–10]
Loss	16–16	Nov 2023	ITF Heraklion, Greece	W40	Clay	(Romania) Oana Gavrilă	(Belgium) Lara Salden (Latvia) Daniela Vismane	4–6, 3–6
Loss	16–17	Dec 2023	ITF Monastir, Tunisia	W25	Hard	(Germany) Katharina Hobgarski	(Belgium) Magali Kempen (Belgium) Lara Salden	7–6^{(5)}, 4–6, [4–10]
Win	17–17	Jan 2024	ITF Nonthaburi, Thailand	W50	Hard	(Kazakhstan) Zhibek Kulambayeva	(Thailand) Lanlana Tararudee (Chinese Taipei) Tsao Chia-yi	w/o
Win	18–17	Feb 2024	ITF Hammamet, Tunisia	W35	Clay	(Romania) Oana Gavrilă	Amina Anshba (Germany) Katharina Hobgarski	6–7^{(5)}, 7–5, [10–4]
Win	19–17	Feb 2024	ITF Hammamet, Tunisia	W35	Clay	(Romania) Oana Gavrilă	(France) Emma Léné (France) Astrid Lew Yan Foon	6–1, 6–3
Win	20–17	Feb 2024	ITF Monastir, Tunisia	W15	Hard	(Germany) Mara Guth	(Germany) Luisa Hrda (Germany) Yasmine Wagner	7–5, 6–1
Win	21–17	Mar 2024	ITF Heraklion, Greece	W15	Clay	(Greece) Elena Christofi	(France) Lucie Nguyen Tan; Ksenia Zaytseva	6–3, 6–3
Loss	21–18	Mar 2024	ITF Heraklion, Greece	W15	Clay	(Italy) Laura Mair	(France) Lucie Nguyen Tan (Slovakia) Nina Vargová	6–4, 4–6, [9–11]
Loss	21–19	Mar 2024	ITF Heraklion, Greece	W15	Clay	(Italy) Irene Lavino	(Germany) Katharina Hobgarski; Polina Leykina	6–4, 1–6, [3–10]
Win	22–19	Mar 2024	ITF Santa Margherita di Pula, Italy	W35	Clay	(Italy) Aurora Zantedeschi	(Czech Republic) Lucie Havlíčková (Serbia) Lola Radivojević	6–4, 6–2
Win	23–19	Apr 2024	ITF Santa Margherita di Pula	W35	Clay	(Poland) Martyna Kubka	(Italy) Anastasia Abbagnato (Netherlands) Eva Vedder	6–3, 3–6, [10–6]
Loss	23–20	Apr 2024	ITF Santa Margherita di Pula	W35	Clay	(India) Vasanti Shinde	(Spain) Yvonne Cavallé Reimers (Italy) Aurora Zantedeschi	6–3, 4–6, [9–11]
Loss	23–21	Apr 2024	Koper Open, Slovenia	W75	Clay	(Italy) Aurora Zantedeschi	(Slovenia) Veronika Erjavec (Czech Republic) Dominika Šalková	1–6, 3–6
Loss	23–22	Apr 2024	ITF Santa Margherita di Pula, Italy	W35	Clay	(Greece) Eleni Christofi	(Poland) Martyna Kubka (Netherlands) Eva Vedder	5–7, 3–6
Loss	23–23	Apr 2024	ITF Santa Margherita di Pula	W35	Clay	(Finland) Laura Hietaranta	(Venezuela) Andrea Gámiz (Netherlands) Eva Vedder	6–2, 2–6, [4–10]
Loss	23–24	Jun 2024	Macha Lake Open, Czech Republic	W75	Clay	(China) Feng Shuo	(Poland) Maja Chwalińska (Czech Republic) Anastasia Dețiuc	3–6, 6–2, [6–10]
Loss	23–25	Jul 2024	ITF Darmstadt, Germany	W35	Clay	(Czech Republic) Karolína Kubáňová	(Australia) Jaimee Fourlis (Australia) Petra Hule	4–6, 2–6
Loss	23–26	Aug 2024	Zagreb Open, Croatia	W50	Clay	(Bulgaria) Lia Karatancheva	(Slovenia) Živa Falkner (Hungary) Amarissa Tóth	4–6, 3–6
Loss	23–27	Aug 2024	Přerov Cup, Czech Republic	W75	Clay	(Germany) Noma Noha Akugue	Elena Pridankina (Czech Republic) Julie Štruplová	3–6, 4–6
Loss	23-28	Sep 2024	ITF Saint Palais sur Mer, France	W50	Clay	(Lithuania) Justina Mikulskytė	(France) Sarah Iliev (France) Emma Léné	6–7^{(5)}, 2–6
Loss	23–29	Sep 2024	Pazardzhik Cup, Bulgaria	W75	Clay	(Bulgaria) Lia Karatancheva	(Slovenia) Veronika Erjavec (Bosnia and Herzegovina) Anita Wagner	5–7, 6–3, [5–10]
Win	24–29	Sep 2024	ITF Santa Margherita di Pula, Italy	W35	Clay	(Romania) Arina Vasilescu	(Italy) Noemi Basiletti (Italy) Vittoria Paganetti	6–2, 6–2
Win	25–29	Oct 2024	ITF Santa Margherita di Pula	W35	Clay	(Finland) Laura Hietaranta	(Italy) Alessandra Mazzola (Italy) Federica Urgesi	6–3, 6–4
Win	26–29	Oct 2024	ITF Santa Margherita di Pula	W35	Clay	(Sweden) Lisa Zaar	(Romania) Andreea Prisacariu (Italy) Federica Urgesi	6–3, 6–4
Loss	26–30	Oct 2024	ITF Heraklion, Greece	W15	Clay	(Greece) Eleni Chatziavraam	(Romania) Ilinca Amariei (Greece) Elena Korokozidi	6–3, 3–6, [9–11]
Win	27–30	Nov 2024	ITF Heraklion, Greece	W15	Clay	(Greece) Eleni Christofi	(Norway) Astrid Wanja Brune Olsen (Germany) Franziska Sziedat	walkover
Win	28–30	Nov 2024	ITF Heraklion, Greece	W15	Clay	(Greece) Dimitra Pavlou	(Belgium) Tilwith Di Girolami (Lithuania) Patricija Paukštytė	2–1 ret.
Win	29–30	Jan 2025	ITF Monastir, Tunisia	W15	Hard	(Slovakia) Radka Zelníčková	(United States) Dalayna Hewitt (Serbia) Elena Milovanović	6–1, 6–3
Loss	29–31	Feb 2025	ITF Monastir, Tunisia	W15	Hard	(India) Diva Bhatia	(France) Yasmine Mansouri (Serbia) Elena Milovanović	2–6, 0–6
Win	30–31	Mar 2025	ITF Monastir, Tunisia	W15	Hard	(Slovakia) Radka Zelníčková	(Italy) Lavinia Luciano (Romania) Maria Toma	6–2, 6–3
Win	31–31	Mar 2025	ITF Monastir, Tunisia	W15	Hard	(Slovakia) Radka Zelníčková	Sofya Gapankova; Daria Khomutsianskaya	6–1, 6–0
Win	32–31	Apr 2025	Bellinzona Ladies Open, Switzerland	W75	Clay	(Czech Republic) Aneta Kučmová	(Switzerland) Jenny Dürst (United States) Elizabeth Mandlik	7–6^{(3)}, 3–6, [10–2]
Loss	32–32	May 2025	Prague Open, Czech Republic	W75	Clay	(Czech Republic) Aneta Kučmová	(Czech Republic) Denisa Hindová (Netherlands) Jasmijn Gimbrère	6–7^{(5)}, 5–7
Win	33–32	May 2025	ITF Portorož, Slovenia	W50	Clay	(United States) Rasheeda McAdoo	(Argentina) Jazmín Ortenzi (Italy) Aurora Zantedeschi	6–4, 6–3
Win	34–32	Aug 2025	ITF Bydgoszcz, Poland	W35	Hard	(Poland) Zuzanna Pawlikowska	(Slovakia) Katarína Kužmová (Slovakia) Nina Vargová	6–2, 6–4
Win	35–32	Sep 2025	Pazardzhik Cup, Bulgaria	W50+H	Clay	(Bulgaria) Lia Karatancheva	(France) Yara Bartashevich; Alevtina Ibragimova	6–2, 7–5
Win	36–32	Sep 2025	Pazardzhik Cup, Bulgaria	W50+H	Clay	(Bulgaria) Lia Karatancheva	(Romania) Elena Ruxandra Bertea; Daria Lodikova	6–7^{(5)}, 6–4, [10–5]
Win	37–32	Sep 2025	ITF Bucharest, Romania	W75	Clay	(Romania) Oana Gavrilă	(Romania) Mara Gae (Netherlands) Arantxa Rus	6–4, 6–2
Win	38–32	Oct 2025	Hamburg Ladies & Gents Cup, Germany	W75	Hard (i)	(Poland) Martyna Kubka	(Germany) Tessa Johanna Brockmann (Germany) Phillippa Preugschat	6–3, 6–2
Win	39–32	Oct 2025	ITF Villeneuve-d'Ascq, France	W35	Hard (i)	(Poland) Martyna Kubka	(France) Diana Martynov (France) Marie Villet	7–5, 6–1
Loss	39–33	Nov 2025	ITF Heraklion, Greece	W15	Clay	(Greece) Marianne Argyrokastriti	(Greece) Elena Korokozidi; Vlada Svarkovskaia	3–6, 6–1, [8–10]
Win	40–33	Nov 2025	ITF Heraklion, Greece	W15	Clay	(Germany) Eva Marie Voracek	(Latvia) Margarita Ignatjeva (Greece) Elena Korokozidi	walkover
Win	41–33	Dec 2025	ITF Monastir, Tunisia	W15	Hard	(China) Mi Lan	(Italy) Carolina Gasparini (Italy) Lavinia Luciano	6–3, 6–4
Win	42–33	Dec 2025	ITF Monastir, Tunisia	W15	Hard	(China) Mi Lan	Arina Arifullina (Egypt) Yasmin Ezzat	6–2, 6–2
Win	43–33	Dec 2025	ITF Monastir, Tunisia	W15	Hard	(China) Mi Lan	(Turkey) İrem Kurt (Romania) Maria Toma	6–1, 6–0
Loss	43–34	Feb 2026	ITF Monastir, Tunisia	W15	Hard	(Slovakia) Radka Zelníčková	(South Korea) Choi On-yu (Bulgaria) Yoana Konstantinova	7–5, 1–6, [8–10]
Win	44–34	Feb 2026	ITF Monastir, Tunisia	W35	Hard	(South Korea) Back Da-yeon	Alina Yuneva; Daria Egorova	6–3, 6–2
Win	45–34	Mar 2026	ITF San Gregorio, Italy	W35	Clay	(Czech Republic) Aneta Kučmová	(Spain) Yvonne Cavallé Reimers (Italy) Aurora Zantedeschi	6–2, 4–6, [10–6]
Win	46–34	Apr 2026	ITF Santa Margherita di Pula, Italy	W35	Clay	(Romania) Briana Szabó	(Greece) Marianna Argyrokastriti (Romania) Arina Vasilescu	6–7^{(4)}, 7–6^{(6)}, [10–6]
Win	47–34	Apr 2026	Chiasso Open, Switzerland	W75	Clay	(United States) Rasheeda McAdoo	(Czech Republic) Aneta Kučmová (Czech Republic) Aneta Laboutková	6–2, 3–6, [10–8]
Win	48–34	May 2026	ITF Klagenfurt, Austria	W35	Clay	(Netherlands) Jasmijn Gimbrère	(Bulgaria) Denislava Glushkova (Austria) Mavie Österreicher	6–0, 6–0
Win	49–34	Jun 2026	Internationaux de Blois, France	W75	Clay	(Romania) Oana Gavrilă	(Ukraine) Anastasiia Firman (Italy) Isabella Șerban	6–4, 6–2
Loss	49–35	Jun 2026	ITF Tarvisio, Italy	W35	Clay	(Slovakia) Radka Zelníčková	(Czech Republic) Aneta Kučmová (Czech Republic) Aneta Laboutková	0–6, 3–6
Win	50–35	Jun 2026	ITF Aix-les-Bains, France	W35	Clay	(Netherlands) Jasmijn Gimbrère	(France) Yara Bartashevich (France) Lucie Nguyen Tan	6–7^{(4)}, 7–5, [10–7]
Win	51–35	Jul 2026	ITF Horb, Germany	W50	Clay	(France) Lucie Nguyen Tan	(South Korea) Park So-hyun (South Korea) Back Da-yeon	6–2, 2–6, [10–7]
Loss	51–36	Jul 2026	Ladies Open Hechingen, Germany	W75	Clay	(Italy) Aurora Zantedeschi	(Italy) Enola Chiesa (Slovenia) Dalila Jakupović	3–6, 6–2, [10–12]
Loss	51–37	Aug 2026	ITF Leipzig, Germany	W75	Clay	(United States) Rasheeda McAdoo	(Czech Republic) Aneta Kučmová (Czech Republic) Aneta Laboutková	5–7, 2–6
Loss	51–38	Aug 2026	ITF Bytom, Poland	W75	Clay	(Romania) Oana Gavrilă	(China) Feng Shuo (China) Li Zongyu	4–6, 2–6
Win	52–38	Sep 2026	Pazardzhik Cup, Bulgaria	W50	Clay	(Romania) Oana Gavrilă	(United States) Julia Adams (Netherlands) Merel Hoedt	6–4, 6–4
Win	53–38	Sep 2026	ITF Plovdiv, Bulgaria	W50	Clay	(Romania) Oana Gavrilă	(Sweden) Caijsa Hennemann (Sweden) Nellie Taraba Wallberg	6–0, 7–6^{(2)}
Win	54–38	Nov 2026	ITF Heraklion, Greece	W35	Clay (i)	(Romania) Oana Gavrilă	(Greece) Marianna Argyrokastriti (Spain) Lucía Cortez Llorca	2–6, 6–4, [10–7]
