= Karolína Kubáňová =

Czech tennis player (born 2001)

- Country (sports): Czech Republic
- Born: 28 May 2001 (age 25)
- Plays: Right (two-handed backhand)
- Prize money: $34,481

Singles
- Career record: 71–57
- Career titles: 0
- Highest ranking: No. 776 (9 December 2019)

Doubles
- Career record: 117–72
- Career titles: 11 ITF
- Highest ranking: No. 238 (6 November 2023)
- Current ranking: No. 647 (25 May 2026)
Medal record
Representing Czech Republic
World University Games
Bronze medal – third place	2025 Rhine-Ruhr	Mixed doubles
- Last updated on: 5 June 2026.

Karolína Kubáňová (born 28 May 2001) is a Czech inactive tennis player.

Kubáňová has a career-high singles ranking by the Women's Tennis Association (WTA) of 776, achieved on 9 December 2019, and a best WTA doubles ranking of 238, set on 6 November 2023.

She won her first bigger ITF title at the 2022 Macha Lake Open, in the doubles draw partnering Aneta Kučmová.

== ITF Circuit finals ==
=== Doubles: 22 (11 titles, 11 runner-ups) ===
Legend W60/75 tournaments (2–2) W25/35 tournaments (4–5) W15 tournaments (5–3)	Finals by surface Hard (0–1) Clay (11–8) Carpet (0–1)

Result	W–L	Date	Tournament	Tier	Surface	Partner	Opponents	Score
Loss	0–1	Jun 2018	Zubr Cup, Czech Republic	15,000	Clay	(Czech Republic) Laetitia Pulchartová	(Slovakia) Jana Jablonovská (Slovakia) Lenka Juríková	6–2, 1–6, [6–10]
Win	1–1	Sep 2018	ITF Říčany, Czech Republic	15,000	Clay	(Czech Republic) Nikola Tomanová	(Germany) Julyette Steur (Czech Republic) Vendula Žovincová	6–7^{(2)}, 6–4, [11–9]
Win	2–1	Sep 2018	ITF Prague, Czech Republic	15,000	Clay	(Czech Republic) Nikola Tomanová	(Canada) Petra Januskova (Germany) Julyette Steur	4–6, 6–3, [10–7]
Win	3–1	Sep 2018	ITF Frýdek-Místek, Czech Republic	15,000	Clay	(Czech Republic) Nikola Tomanová	(Canada) Petra Januskova (Russia) Anna Ukolova	6–1, 6–3
Loss	3–2	Dec 2018	ITF Jablonec nad Nisou, Czech Republic	15,000	Carpet	(Czech Republic) Nikola Tomanová	(Czech Republic) Karolína Beránková (Czech Republic) Barbora Miklová	5–7, 4–6
Loss	3–3	Apr 2019	ITF Antalya, Turkey	W15	Clay	(Czech Republic) Nikola Tomanová	(Switzerland) Marie Mettraux (Russia) Vera Zvonareva	3–6, 6–0, [10–12]
Win	4–3	Apr 2019	ITF Antalya, Turkey	W15	Clay	(Czech Republic) Nikola Tomanová	(Germany) Franziska Kommer (Germany) Laura Schaeder	6–3, 6–2
Win	5–3	Jun 2019	Zubr Cup, Czech Republic	W25	Clay	(Czech Republic) Nikola Tomanová	(Czech Republic) Kateřina Mandelíková (Russia) Anna Morgina	6–4, 7–6^{(2)}
Win	6–3	Jun 2022	Macha Lake Open, Czech Republic	W60	Clay	(Czech Republic) Aneta Kučmová	(Italy) Nuria Brancaccio (Greece) Despina Papamichail	6–2, 7–6^{(9)}
Loss	6–4	Jul 2022	ITF Aschaffenburg, Germany	W25	Clay	(Czech Republic) Ivana Šebestová	Irina Khromacheva; Maria Timofeeva	2–6, 7–5, [3–10]
Win	7–4	Aug 2022	ITF Kottingbrunn, Austria	W15	Clay	(Czech Republic) Ivana Šebestová	(Czech Republic) Linda Ševčíková (Czech Republic) Karolína Vlčková	6–4, 6–0
Win	8–4	Aug 2022	ITF Radom, Poland	W25	Clay	(Czech Republic) Denisa Hindová	(Japan) Funa Kozaki (Turkey) İlay Yörük	6–1, 6–2
Loss	8–5	Apr 2023	ITF Osijek, Croatia	W25	Clay	(Czech Republic) Denisa Hindová	(Czech Republic) Julie Štruplová (Czech Republic) Dominika Šalková	3–6, 4–6
Win	9–5	Jun 2023	ITF Říčany, Czech Republic	W60	Clay	(Czech Republic) Aneta Kučmová	(Slovenia) Veronika Erjavec (Czech Republic) Dominika Šalková	4–6, 6–3, [10–4]
Loss	9–6	Jul 2023	ITF Stuttgart, Germany	W25	Clay	(Czech Republic) Denisa Hindová	(Japan) Mana Kawamura (Japan) Yuki Naito	2–6, 7–6^{(4)}, [7–10]
Loss	9–7	Oct 2023	Bratislava Open, Slovakia	W60	Hard (i)	(Czech Republic) Denisa Hindová	(France) Estelle Cascino (Czech Republic) Jesika Malečková	3–6, 2–6
Loss	9–8	Jun 2024	ITF Villach, Austria	W35	Clay	(Czech Republic) Renata Voráčová	(Czech Republic) Aneta Kučmová (Slovenia) Nika Radišić	1–6, 4–6
Win	10–8	Jun 2024	ITF Gdańsk, Poland	W35	Clay	(Czech Republic) Renata Voráčová	(Australia) Petra Hule (Australia) Jaimee Fourlis	3–6, 7–6^{(5)}, [10–7]
Loss	10–9	Jul 2024	ITF Darmstadt, Germany	W35	Clay	(Greece) Sapfo Sakellaridi	(Australia) Petra Hule (Australia) Jaimee Fourlis	4–6, 2–6
Win	11–9	Jul 2024	ITF Køge, Denmark	W35	Clay	(Czech Republic) Denisa Hindová	(Romania) Oana Gavrilă (United States) Haley Giavara	6–3, 6–2
Loss	11–10	Aug 2024	ITF Bielsko-Biała, Poland	W15	Clay	(Czech Republic) Aneta Laboutková	(Poland) Weronika Ewald (Poland) Daria Kuczer	5–7, 6–1, [6–10]
Loss	11–11	Jul 2025	ITF Cordenons, Italy	W75	Clay	(Czech Republic) Aneta Laboutková	(Chinese Taipei) Liang En-shuo (Thailand) Peangtarn Plipuech	4–6, 2–6

== Junior finals ==
=== ITF Junior Circuit ===
==== Singles (0–1) ====
Legend
Grade 3
Grade 4 (0–1)
Grade 5 (0–0)

Result	W–L	Date	Tournament	Tier	Surface	Opponent	Score
Loss	0–1	Jul 2018	ITF Véska, Czech Republic	Grade 4	Clay	(Czech Republic) Alexandra Silná	5–7, 3–6
