= Aneta Kučmová =

Czech tennis player (born 2000)

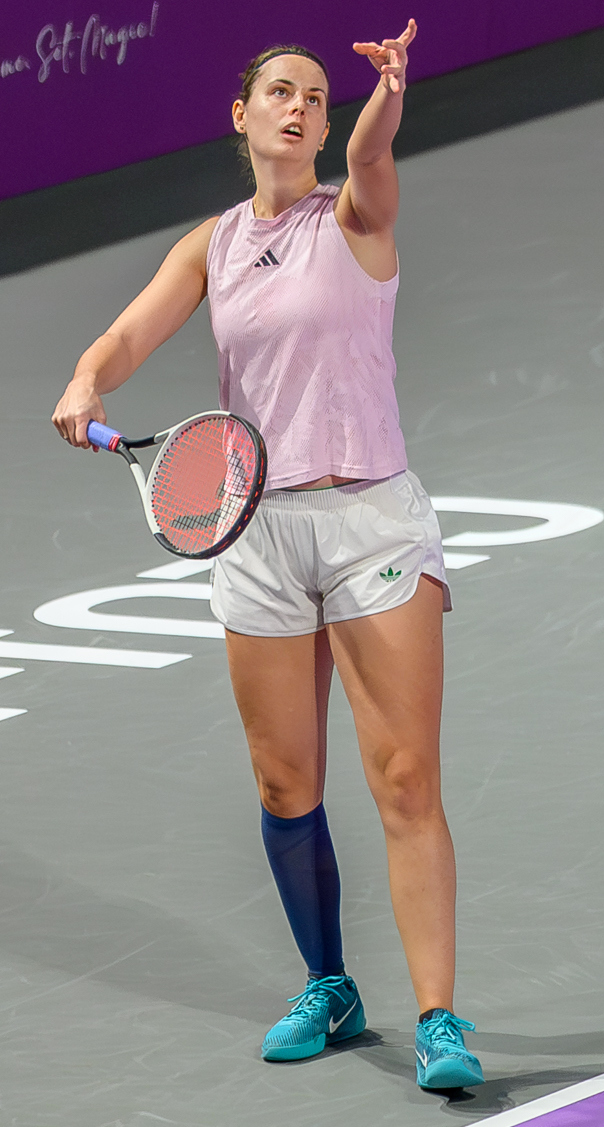
- Kučmová at the 2026 Transylvania Open
- Country (sports): Czech Republic
- Born: 22 May 2000 (age 26)
- Plays: Right-handed
- Prize money: US$ 139,130

Singles
- Career record: 229–167
- Career titles: 4 ITF
- Highest ranking: No. 296 (9 September 2024)
- Current ranking: No. 535 (19 October 2026)

Doubles
- Career record: 144–83
- Career titles: 1 WTA 125, 19 ITF
- Highest ranking: No. 109 (19 October 2026)
- Current ranking: No. 109 (19 October 2026)
- Last updated on: 25 October 2026.

Aneta Kučmová (née Kladivová; born 22 May 2000) is a Czech tennis player.

She has been ranked by the Women's Tennis Association (WTA) as high as 296 in singles and 109 in doubles.

Kučmová won her first W60 title at the 2022 Macha Lake Open, in the doubles draw, partnering with Karolína Kubáňová.

== Professional ==
She won her first ITF Circuit title at a $15k tournament in Brno alongside fellow Czech player Aneta Laboutková. Six years later, in May 2022, she won her first singles title at a $15k event in Krško. There, she also won the doubles title, the second in her career. Two weeks later, she won her second singles title at the $15k Banja Luka tournament. The following week, she won the doubles title at the Macha Lake Open, her first $60k title, partnered with fellow Czech Karolína Kubáňová. The pair got another $60k title in June 2023 at the Říčany Open.

== WTA 125 finals ==
=== Doubles: 2 (1 title, 1 runner-up) ===
Result	W–L	Date	Tournament	Surface	Partner	Opponents	Score
Win	1–0	Sep 2026	Antalya Challenger, Turkey	Clay	(Czech Republic) Aneta Laboutková	Alevtina Ibragimova; Ksenia Zaytseva	4–6, 6–2, [10–6]
Loss	1–1	Sep 2026	Tolentino Open, Italy	Clay	(Czech Republic) Aneta Laboutková	(Greece) Despina Papamichail (Georgia (country)) Ekaterine Gorgodze	1–6, 2–6

== ITF Circuit finals ==
=== Singles: 8 (4 titles, 4 runner-ups) ===
Legend W75 tournaments (0–1) W25 tournaments (1–1) W15 tournaments (3–2)	Finals by surface Clay (4–4)

Result	W–L	Date	Tournament	Tier	Surface	Opponent	Score
Loss	0–1	May 2018	ITF Kaposvár, Hungary	W15	Clay	(Hungary) Anna Bondár	4–6, 6–7^{(3)}
Loss	0–2	Sep 2019	ITF Curtea de Argeș, Romania	W15	Clay	(Romania) Oana Georgeta Simion	3–6, 2–6
Loss	0–3	Sep 2021	ITF Jablonec nad Nisou, Czech Republic	W25	Clay	(Czech Republic) Jesika Malečková	2–6, 6–2, 2–6
Win	1–3	May 2022	ITF Krško, Slovenia	W15	Clay	(Slovenia) Kristina Novak	7–5, 6–1
Win	2–3	Jun 2022	ITF Banja Luka, Bosnia and Herzegovina	W15	Clay	(Slovakia) Katarína Kužmová	6–3, 6–2
Win	3–3	Aug 2022	ITF Eupen, Belgium	W25	Clay	(Belgium) Marie Benoît	7–5, 6–4
Loss	3–4	Jun 2024	Macha Lake Open, Czech Republic	W75	Clay	(Czech Republic) Tereza Valentová	3–6, 5–7
Win	4–4	Sep 2024	ITF Nogent-sur-Marne, France	W15	Clay	(Germany) Mariella Thamm	6–3, 6–1

=== Doubles: 29 (19 titles, 10 runner-ups) ===
Legend W100 tournaments (1–0) W60/75 tournaments (7–6) W50 tournaments (0–1) W25/35 tournaments (9–0) W10/15 tournaments (2–3)	Finals by surface Hard (3–2) Clay (15–7) Carpet (1–1)

Result	W–L	Date	Tournament	Tier	Surface	Partner	Opponents	Score
Loss	0–1	Sep 2016	ITF Říčany, Czech Republic	10k	Clay	(Czech Republic) Sonja Křtěnová	(Czech Republic) Nikola Novotná (Czech Republic) Nikola Tomanová	1–6, 0–6
Win	1–1	Sep 2016	ITF Brno, Czech Republic	10k	Clay	(Czech Republic) Aneta Laboutková	(Poland) Maja Chwalińska (Poland) Paulina Czarnik	7–6^{(5)}, 3–6, [12–10]
Loss	1–2	Sep 2017	ITF Brno, Czech Republic	15k	Clay	(Czech Republic) Vendula Žovincová	(Slovakia) Jana Jablonovská (Slovakia) Natália Vajdová	4–6, 4–6
Loss	1–3	Dec 2017	ITF Jablonec nad Nisou, Czech Republic	15k	Carpet (i)	(Czech Republic) Vendula Žovincová	(Czech Republic) Dagmar Dudlaková (Poland) Joanna Zawadzka	6–0, 3–6, [10–12]
Win	2–3	May 2022	ITF Krško, Slovenia	W15	Clay	(Slovenia) Manca Pislak	Victoria Borodulina (United Kingdom) Sashi Kempster	6–1, 6–2
Win	3–3	Jun 2022	Macha Lake Open, Czech Republic	W60	Clay	(Czech Republic) Karolína Kubáňová	(Italy) Nuria Brancaccio (Greece) Despina Papamichail	6–2, 7–6^{(9)}
Win	4–3	Aug 2022	ITF Eupen, Belgium	W25	Clay	(Japan) Misaki Matsuda	(Chile) Fernanda Labraña (Italy) Anna Turati	7–6^{(5)}, 6–3
Loss	4–4	May 2023	Prague Open, Czech Republic	W60	Clay	(Australia) Kaylah McPhee	(Czech Republic) Jesika Malečková (Poland) Maja Chwalińska	0–6, 6–7^{(5)}
Win	5–4	Jun 2023	ITF Říčany, Czech Republic	W60	Clay	(Czech Republic) Karolína Kubáňová	(Slovenia) Veronika Erjavec (Czech Republic) Dominika Šalková	4–6, 6–3, [10–4]
Win	6–4	May 2024	ITF Villach, Austria	W35	Clay	(Slovenia) Nika Radišić	(Czech Republic) Karolína Kubáňová (Czech Republic) Renata Voráčová	6–1, 6–4
Win	7–4	May 2024	ITF Klagenfurt, Austria	W35	Clay	(Slovenia) Nika Radišić	(Australia) Kaylah McPhee (Slovakia) Nina Vargová	6–3, 7–5
Win	8–4	Jul 2024	ITF Horb, Germany	W35	Clay	(Slovenia) Nika Radišić	Alina Charaeva (Japan) Yuki Naito	6–4, 6–7^{(3)}, [10–2]
Win	9–4	Nov 2024	Ismaning Open, Germany	W75	Carpet (i)	(Czech Republic) Aneta Laboutková	(Netherlands) Isabelle Haverlag (France) Carole Monnet	4–6, 6–4, [10–7]
Loss	9–5	Nov 2024	Trnava Indoor, Slovakia	W75	Hard (i)	(Czech Republic) Anastasia Dețiuc	(United Kingdom) Madeleine Brooks (Netherlands) Isabelle Haverlag	6–7^{(5)}, 1–6
Win	10–5	Jan 2025	ITF Esch-sur-Alzette, Luxembourg	W35	Hard (i)	(Czech Republic) Aneta Laboutková	(Ukraine) Veronika Podrez (France) Marine Szostak	6–3, 6–2
Win	11–5	Mar 2025	ITF Terrassa, Spain	W35	Clay	(Germany) Caroline Werner	Alina Charaeva (France) Yasmine Mansouri	3–6, 6–1, [10–6]
Win	12–5	Apr 2025	Bellinzona Ladies Open, Switzerland	W75	Clay	(Greece) Sapfo Sakellaridi	(Switzerland) Jenny Dürst (United States) Elizabeth Mandlik	7–6^{(3)}, 3–6, [10–2]
Loss	12–6	May 2025	Prague Open, Czech Republic	W75	Clay	(Greece) Sapfo Sakellaridi	(Czech Republic) Denisa Hindová (Netherlands) Jasmijn Gimbrère	6–7^{(5)}, 5–7
Loss	12–7	Jun 2025	Macha Lake Open, Czech Republic	W75	Clay	(Bulgaria) Lia Karatancheva	(Czech Republic) Alena Kovačková (Czech Republic) Ivana Šebestová	6–1, 5–7, [5–10]
Win	13–7	Jun 2025	ITF Tarvisio, Italy	W35	Clay	(Poland) Daria Kuczer	(Slovenia) Dalila Jakupović (Slovenia) Nika Radišić	2–6, 6–1, [13–11]
Loss	13–8	Aug 2025	ITF Bytom, Poland	W50	Clay	(Italy) Miriana Tona	(Poland) Weronika Ewald (Poland) Zuzanna Pawlikowska	6–3, 3–6, [7–10]
Win	14–8	Nov 2025	Trnava Indoor, Slovakia	W75	Hard (i)	(Slovenia) Nika Radišić	(Slovakia) Katarína Kužmová (Slovakia) Nina Vargová	6–4, 6–3
Loss	14–9	Feb 2026	Trnava Indoor, Slovakia	W75	Hard (i)	(Czech Republic) Aneta Laboutková	(Australia) Olivia Gadecki; Anastasia Tikhonova	3–6, 3–6
Win	15–9	Mar 2026	ITF San Gregorio, Italy	W35	Clay	(Greece) Sapfo Sakellaridi	(Spain) Yvonne Cavallé Reimers (Italy) Aurora Zantedeschi	6–2, 4–6, [10–6]
Win	16–9	Apr 2026	ITF Calvi, France	W75	Hard	(Czech Republic) Aneta Laboutková	(Czech Republic) Michaela Bayerlová (Australia) Tenika McGiffin	6–4, 3–6, [10–3]
Loss	16–10	Apr 2026	Chiasso Open, Switzerland	W75	Clay	(Czech Republic) Aneta Laboutková	(United States) Rasheeda McAdoo (Greece) Sapfo Sakellaridi	2–6, 6–3, [8–10]
Win	17–10	Jun 2026	ITF Tarvisio, Italy	W35	Clay	(Czech Republic) Aneta Laboutková	(Greece) Sapfo Sakellaridi (Slovakia) Radka Zelníčková	6–0, 6–3
Win	18–10	Jul 2026	Ladies Open Amstetten, Austria	W100	Clay	(Czech Republic) Aneta Laboutková	(Spain) Ángela Fita Boluda (Czech Republic) Anna Sisková	6–1, 1–6, [16–14]
Win	19–10	Aug 2026	ITF Leipzig, Germany	W75	Clay	(Czech Republic) Aneta Laboutková	(United States) Rasheeda McAdoo (Greece) Sapfo Sakellaridi	7–5, 6–2
