= Denisa Hindová =

Czech tennis player (born 2002)

- Country (sports): Czech Republic
- Born: 17 July 2002 (age 24)
- Plays: Right-handed
- Prize money: $71,549

Singles
- Career record: 177–161
- Career titles: 1 ITF
- Highest ranking: No. 519 (15 July 2024)

Doubles
- Career record: 127–86
- Career titles: 11 ITF
- Highest ranking: No. 241 (9 June 2025)
- Current ranking: No. 1070 (10 August 2026)
- Last updated on: 17 August 2026.

Denisa Hindová (born 17 July 2002) is a Czech tennis player.

She won her first ITF Circuit title at the W25 Radom tournament in doubles event alongside compatriot Karolína Kubáňová.

Hindová won her first W75 title at the 2025 Advantage Cars Prague Open, in the doubles draw, partnering Jasmijn Gimbrère.

== ITF Circuit finals ==
=== Singles: 5 (1 title, 4 runner-ups) ===
Legend W35 tournaments W15 tournaments (1–4)	Finals by surface Hard (0–1) Clay (1–3)

Result	W–L	Date	Tournament	Tier	Surface	Opponent	Score
Loss	0–1	Nov 2022	ITF Oberpullendorf, Austria	W15	Hard (i)	(Croatia) Lucija Ćirić Bagarić	4–6, 2–6
Loss	0–2	Mar 2023	ITF Antalya, Turkey	W15	Clay	(Kazakhstan) Zhibek Kulambayeva	1–6, 3–6
Loss	0–3	Mar 2024	ITF Antalya, Turkey	W15	Clay	(Bulgaria) Denislava Glushkova	4–6, 6–7^{(4)}
Win	1–3	Apr 2024	ITF Antalya, Turkey	W15	Clay	(Germany) Chantal Sauvant	6–2, 6–7^{(3)}, 7–6^{(5)}
Loss	1–4	Apr 2024	ITF Osijek, Croatia	W15	Clay	(Hungary) Amarissa Tóth	2–6, 1–6

=== Doubles: 16 (11 titles, 5 runner-ups) ===
Legend W60/75 tournaments (1–1) W50 tournaments (1–0) W25/35 tournaments (3–4) W15 tournaments (6–0)	Finals by surface Hard (0–2) Clay (11–3)

Result	W–L	Date	Tournament	Tier	Surface	Partner	Opponents	Score
Win	1–0	Aug 2022	ITF Radom, Poland	W25	Clay	(Czech Republic) Karolína Kubáňová	(Japan) Funa Kozaki (Turkey) İlay Yörük	6–1, 6–2
Win	2–0	Mar 2023	ITF Antalya, Turkey	W15	Clay	(Slovenia) Nika Radišić	(Turkey) Başak Eraydın (Japan) Yukina Saigo	7–6^{(6)}, 6–3
Loss	2–1	Apr 2023	ITF Osijek, Croatia	W25	Clay	(Czech Republic) Karolína Kubáňová	(Czech Republic) Julie Štruplová (Czech Republic) Dominika Šalková	3–6, 4–6
Win	3–1	May 2023	ITF Feld am See, Austria	W25	Clay	(United States) Chiara Scholl	(Belgium) Sofia Costoulas (Canada) Kayla Cross	6–2, 6–0
Loss	3–2	Jul 2023	ITF Stuttgart, Germany	W25	Clay	(Czech Republic) Karolína Kubáňová	(Japan) Mana Kawamura (Japan) Yuki Naito	2–6, 7–6^{(4)}, [7–10]
Loss	3–3	Oct 2023	Bratislava Open, Slovakia	W60	Hard (i)	(Czech Republic) Karolína Kubáňová	(France) Estelle Cascino (Czech Republic) Jesika Malečková	3–6, 2–6
Win	4–3	Mar 2024	ITF Antalya, Turkey	W15	Clay	(Italy) Vittoria Modesti	(Bulgaria) Dia Evtimova (Turkey) İlay Yörük	7–5, 6–3
Win	5–3	May 2024	ITF Bol, Croatia	W15	Clay	(Czech Republic) Aneta Laboutková	(Switzerland) Marie Mettraux (Netherlands) Stéphanie Visscher	6–3, 6–4
Win	6–3	Jun 2024	ITF Banja Luka, Bosnia and Herzegovina	W15	Clay	(Italy) Vittoria Modesti	(Switzerland) Marie Mettraux (Turkey) Doğa Türkmen	6–2, 3–6, [10–7]
Win	7–3	Jul 2024	ITF Køge, Denmark	W35	Clay	(Czech Republic) Karolína Kubáňová	(Romania) Oana Gavrilă (United States) Haley Giavara	6–3, 6–2
Loss	7–4	Aug 2024	ITF Leipzig, Germany	W35	Clay	(Czech Republic) Julie Štruplová	(Georgia (country)) Ekaterine Gorgodze (Germany) Katharina Hobgarski	2–6, 6–3, [8–10]
Win	8–4	Mar 2025	ITF Antalya, Turkey	W15	Clay	(Poland) Daria Kuczer	(Romania) Ilinca Amariei (Germany) Chantal Sauvant	6–1, 7–5
Win	9–4	May 2025	ITF Prague Open, Czech Republic	W75	Clay	(Netherlands) Jasmijn Gimbrère	(Czech Republic) Aneta Kučmová (Greece) Sapfo Sakellaridi	7–6^{(5)}, 7–5
Win	10–4	May 2025	ITF Otočec, Slovenia	W50	Clay	(Slovenia) Kristina Novak	(United States) Carolyn Ansari (Japan) Mana Kawamura	6–3, 3–6, [10–8]
Win	11–4	Jun 2025	ITF Kuršumlijska Banja, Serbia	W15	Clay	(Czech Republic) Michaela Bayerlová	(Serbia) Draginja Vuković; Milana Zhabrailova	2–6, 7–6^{(3)}, [10–7]
Loss	11–5	Nov 2025	ITF Liberec, Czech Republic	W35	Hard (i)	(Czech Republic) Alena Kovačková	(Croatia) Lucija Ćirić Bagarić (Czech Republic) Lucie Havlíčková	1–6, 1–6
