= Frances Tiafoe career statistics =

Professional tennis player

Career finals
Discipline	Type	Won	Lost	Total	WR
Singles	Grand Slam	–	–	–	–
Singles	ATP Finals	–	–	–	–
Singles	ATP 1000	0	2	2	0.00
Singles	ATP 500	1	3	4	0.25
Singles	ATP 250	3	4	7	0.43
Singles	Olympics	–	–	–	–
Singles	Total	4	9	13	0.31
Doubles	ATP 1000	–	–	–	–
Doubles	ATP 500	–	–	–	–
Doubles	ATP 250	0	1	1	0.00
Doubles	Total	0	1	1	0.00

This is a list of the main career statistics of American professional tennis player Frances Tiafoe. All statistics are per the ATP Tour and ITF websites.

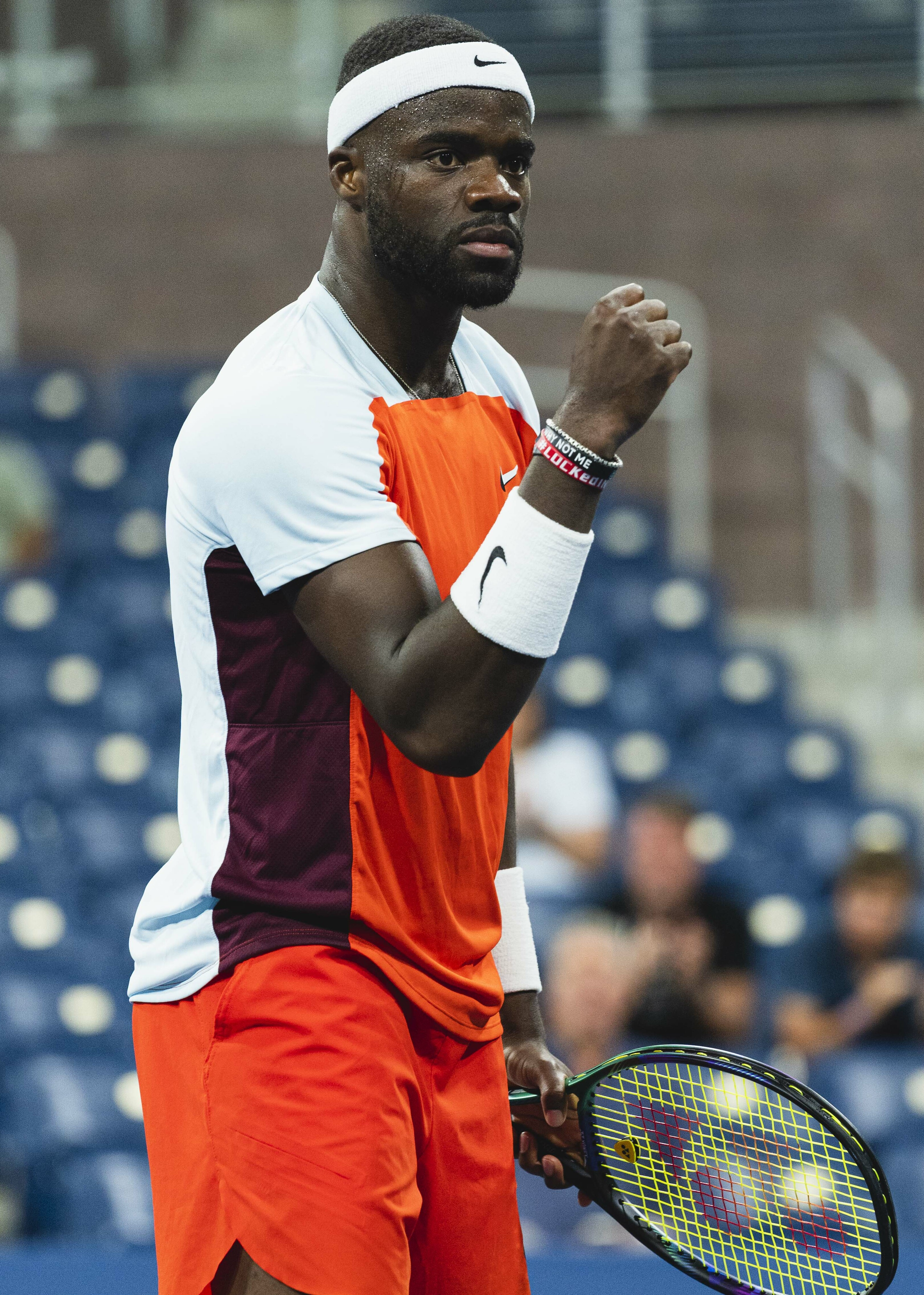
Tiafoe at the 2022 US Open

== Performance timelines ==
Key
W	F	SF	QF	#R	RR	Q#	P#	DNQ	A	Z#	PO	G	S	B	NMS	NTI	P	NH

(W) winner; (F) finalist; (SF) semifinalist; (QF) quarterfinalist; (#R) rounds 4, 3, 2, 1; (RR) round-robin stage; (Q#) qualification round; (P#) preliminary round; (DNQ) did not qualify; (A) absent; (Z#) Davis/Fed Cup Zonal Group (with number indication) or (PO) play-off; (G) gold, (S) silver or (B) bronze Olympic/Paralympic medal; (NMS) not a Masters tournament; (NTI) not a Tier I tournament; (P) postponed; (NH) not held; (SR) strike rate (events won / competed); (W–L) win–loss record.
To avoid confusion and double counting, these charts are updated at the conclusion of a tournament or when the player's participation has ended.

=== Singles ===
Tournament	2014	2015	2016	2017	2018	2019	2020	2021	2022	2023	2024	2025	2026	SR	W–L	Win %
Grand Slam tournaments
Australian Open	A	A	Q2	2R	1R	QF	1R	2R	2R	3R	2R	2R	3R	0 / 10	13–10	57%
French Open	A	1R	Q3	1R	1R	1R	1R	1R	2R	3R	2R	QF	4R	0 / 11	11–11	50%
Wimbledon	A	A	Q1	2R	3R	1R	NH	3R	4R	3R	3R	2R	3R	0 / 9	15–9	63%
US Open	Q1	1R	1R	1R	2R	2R	4R	4R	SF	QF	SF	3R	SF	0 / 12	29–12	71%
Win–loss	0–0	0–2	0–1	2–4	3–4	5–4	3–3	6–4	10–4	10–4	9–4	8–4	12–4	0 / 42	68–42	62%
National representation
Summer Olympics	A	NH				2R	NH				A	NH		0 / 1	1–1	50%
Davis Cup	A	A	A	A	SF	A	RR		QF	RR	A	2R		0 / 5	1–7	13%
ATP 1000 tournaments
Indian Wells Open	A	A	2R	1R	1R	1R	NH	3R	3R	SF	3R	3R	4R	0 / 10	12–10	55%
Miami Open	A	A	A	2R	4R	QF	NH	4R	4R	3R	2R	3R	QF	0 / 9	17–9	65%
Monte-Carlo Masters	A	A	A	A	A	A	NH	A	A	A	A	2R	A	0 / 1	1–1	50%
Madrid Open	A	A	A	A	A	3R	NH	Q1	1R	3R	2R	4R	A	0 / 5	5–5	50%
Italian Open	A	A	A	A	1R	1R	A	Q2	1R	3R	2R	2R	3R	0 / 7	2–7	22%
Canadian Open	A	A	A	1R	3R	A	NH	3R	2R	1R	1R	4R	3R	0 / 8	8–8	50%
Cincinnati Open	A	Q1	A	3R	1R	2R	1R	2R	2R	2R	F	4R	F	0 / 10	18–10	64%
Shanghai Masters	A	A	A	2R	1R	1R	NH			2R	3R	2R	3R	0 / 7	3–7	30%
Paris Masters	A	A	A	A	2R	1R	A	1R	QF	1R	1R	A	2R	0 / 7	4–7	36%
Win–loss	0–0	0–0	1–1	4–5	6–7	6–7	0–1	8–5	8–7	8–8	7–8	9–8	13-7	0 / 64	70–64	52%
Career statistics
Tournaments	1	5	6	17	24	26	11	24	23	21	25	21	17	217		
Titles	0	0	0	0	1	0	0	0	0	2	0	0	1	4		
Finals	0	0	0	0	2	0	0	1	2	2	2	1	2	12		
Overall win–loss	0–1	1–5	1–6	7–18	28–27	23–27	9–11	33–24	35–25	40–21	33–26	26–23	37–16	273–230		
Year-end ranking	1145	176	108	79	39	47	59	38	19	16	18	30		54%		

=== Doubles ===
Tournament	2014	2015	2016	2017	2018	2019	2020	2021	2022	2023	2024	SR	W–L
Grand Slam tournaments
Australian Open	A	A	A	A	1R	A	1R	3R	1R	A	A	0 / 4	2–4
French Open	A	A	A	1R	1R	A	1R	2R	2R	A	1R	0 / 6	1–6
Wimbledon	A	A	A	1R	1R	A	NH	A	A	A	A	0 / 2	0–2
US Open	2R	A	A	A	A	A	A	1R	1R	A	A	0 / 3	1–3
Win–loss	1–1	0–0	0–0	0–2	0–3	0–0	0–2	3–3	0–3	0–0	0–0	0 / 14	4–14
National representation
Summer Olympics	NH		A	NH				2R	NH		A	0 / 1	1–1
ATP 1000 tournaments
Indian Wells Open	A	A	A	A	A	A	NH	A	A	2R	A	0 / 1	0–0
Miami Open	A	A	A	A	A	A	NH	1R	A	A	A	0 / 1	0–1
Madrid Open	A	A	A	A	A	A	NH	A	A	2R	A	0 / 1	1–1
Italian Open	A	A	A	A	A	A	A	A	2R	QF	1R	0 / 3	3–3
Cincinnati Open	A	A	A	A	1R	A	1R	2R	1R	1R	A	0 / 5	1–5
Win–loss	0–0	0–0	0–0	0–0	0–1	0–0	0–1	1–2	1–2	3–3	0–0	0 / 10	5–9
Career statistics
Titles	0	0	0	0	0	0	0	0	0	0	0	0	
Finals	0	0	0	1	0	0	0	0	0	0	0	1	
Overall win–loss	1–1	0–1	0–1	3–3	4–9	1–2	2–4	9–10	4–9	6–7	0–1	30–48	
Year-end ranking	536	N/A	684	367	186	442	595	163	225	194		38%	

== ATP 1000 tournaments finals ==
=== Singles: 2 (2 runner-ups) ===
Result	Year	Tournament	Surface	Opponent	Score
Loss	2024	Cincinnati Open	Hard	(Italy) Jannik Sinner	6–7^{(4–7)}, 2–6
Loss	2026	Cincinnati Open	Hard	(France) Arthur Fils	3–6, 6–1, 0–6

== ATP Tour finals ==
=== Singles: 13 (4 titles, 9 runner-ups) ===
Legend Grand Slam (–) ATP Finals (–) ATP 1000 (0–2) ATP 500 (1–3) ATP 250 (3–4)	Finals by surface Hard (1–5) Clay (1–4) Grass (2–0)	Finals by setting Outdoor (4–8) Indoor (0–1)

Result	W–L	Date	Tournament	Tier	Surface	Opponent	Score
Win	1–0	Feb 2018	Delray Beach Open, US	ATP 250	Hard	(Germany) Peter Gojowczyk	6–1, 6–4
Loss	1–1	May 2018	Estoril Open, Portugal	ATP 250	Clay	(Portugal) João Sousa	4–6, 4–6
Loss	1–2	Oct 2021	Vienna Open, Austria	ATP 500	Hard (i)	(Germany) Alexander Zverev	5–7, 4–6
Loss	1–3	Apr 2022	Estoril Open, Portugal	ATP 250	Clay	(Argentina) Sebastián Báez	3–6, 2–6
Loss	1–4	Oct 2022	Japan Open, Japan	ATP 500	Hard	(United States) Taylor Fritz	6–7^{(3–7)}, 6–7^{(2–7)}
Win	2–4	Apr 2023	U.S. Men's Clay Court Championships, US	ATP 250	Clay	(Argentina) Tomás Martín Etcheverry	7–6^{(7–1)}, 7–6^{(8–6)}
Win	3–4	Jun 2023	Stuttgart Open, Germany	ATP 250	Grass	(Germany) Jan-Lennard Struff	4–6, 7–6^{(7–1)}, 7–6^{(10–8)}
Loss	3–5	Apr 2024	U.S. Men's Clay Court Championships, US	ATP 250	Clay	(United States) Ben Shelton	5–7, 6–4, 3–6
Loss	3–6	Aug 2024	Cincinnati Open, US	ATP 1000	Hard	(Italy) Jannik Sinner	6–7^{(4–7)}, 2–6
Loss	3–7	Mar 2025	U.S. Men's Clay Court Championships, US	ATP 250	Clay	(United States) Jenson Brooksby	4–6, 2–6
Loss	3–8	Feb 2026	Mexican Open, Mexico	ATP 500	Hard	(Italy) Flavio Cobolli	6–7^{(4–7)}, 4–6
Win	4–8	Jun 2026	Halle Open, Germany	ATP 500	Grass	(United States) Taylor Fritz	6–4, 6–4
Loss	4–9	Aug 2026	Cincinnati Open, US	ATP 1000	Hard	(France) Arthur Fils	3–6, 6–1, 0–6

=== Doubles: 1 (runner-up) ===
Legend Grand Slam (–) ATP 1000 (–) ATP 500 (–) ATP 250 (0–1)	Finals by surface Hard (–) Clay (0–1) Grass (–)	Finals by setting Outdoor (0–1) Indoor (–)

Result	W–L	Date	Tournament	Tier	Surface	Partner	Opponents	Score
Loss	0–1	Apr 2017	U.S. Men's Clay Court Championships, US	ATP 250	Clay	(Germany) Dustin Brown	(Chile) Julio Peralta (Argentina) Horacio Zeballos	6–4, 5–7, [6–10]

== National and international representation ==
=== Team competitions finals: 6 (3 titles, 3 runner-ups) ===
Finals by tournaments Davis Cup (–) United Cup (1–0) Laver Cup (2–3)	Finals by teams United States (1–0) World (2–3)

Result	Date	W–L	Tournament	Surface	Team	Partners	Opponent team	Opponent players	Score
Loss	Sep 2017	0–1	Laver Cup, Prague, Czech Republic	Hard (i)	Team World	Sam Querrey; John Isner; Nick Kyrgios; Jack Sock; Denis Shapovalov	Team Europe	Roger Federer; Rafael Nadal; Alexander Zverev; Marin Čilić; Dominic Thiem; Tomáš Berdych	9–15
Loss	Sep 2018	0–2	Laver Cup, Chicago, US	Hard (i)	Team World	Kevin Anderson; John Isner; Diego Schwartzman; Jack Sock; Nick Kyrgios	Team Europe	Roger Federer; Novak Djokovic; Alexander Zverev; Grigor Dimitrov; David Goffin; Kyle Edmund	8–13
Win	Sep 2022	1–2	Laver Cup, London, UK	Hard (i)	Team World	Taylor Fritz; Félix Auger-Aliassime; Diego Schwartzman; Alex de Minaur; Jack Sock	Team Europe	Casper Ruud; Rafael Nadal; Stefanos Tsitsipas; Novak Djokovic; Andy Murray; Roger Federer; Matteo Berrettini; Cameron Norrie	13–8
Win	Jan 2023	2–2	United Cup, Sydney, Australia	Hard	United States	Taylor Fritz; Jessica Pegula; Madison Keys	Italy	Matteo Berrettini; Martina Trevisan; Lorenzo Musetti; Lucia Bronzetti	4–0
Win	Sep 2023	3–2	Laver Cup, Vancouver, Canada	Hard (i)	Team World	Taylor Fritz; Tommy Paul; Félix Auger-Aliassime; Ben Shelton; Francisco Cerúndolo	Team Europe	Andrey Rublev; Casper Ruud; Hubert Hurkacz; Alejandro Davidovich Fokina; Arthur Fils; Gaël Monfils	13–2
Loss	Sep 2024	3–3	Laver Cup, Berlin, Germany	Hard (i)	Team World	Taylor Fritz; Ben Shelton; Alejandro Tabilo; Francisco Cerúndolo; Thanasi Kokkinakis	Team Europe	Carlos Alcaraz; Alexander Zverev; Daniil Medvedev; Casper Ruud; Stefanos Tsitsipas; Grigor Dimitrov	11–13

== ATP Challenger and ITF Tour finals ==
=== Singles: 14 (7 titles, 7 runner-ups) ===
Legend ATP Challenger Tour (6–5) ITF Futures (1–2)	Finals by surface Hard (3–4) Clay (3–3) Grass (1–0)

Result	W–L	Date	Tournament	Tier	Surface	Opponent	Score
Loss	0–1	Apr 2015	Tallahassee Tennis Challenger, US	Challenger	Clay	(Argentina) Facundo Argüello	6–2, 6–7^{(5–7)}, 4–6
Loss	0–2	Nov 2015	Knoxville Challenger, US	Challenger	Hard (i)	(United Kingdom) Dan Evans	7–5, 1–6, 3–6
Loss	0–3	Apr 2016	Tallahassee Tennis Challenger, US	Challenger	Clay	(France) Quentin Halys	7–6^{(8–6)}, 4–6, 2–6
Loss	0–4	Jul 2016	Nielsen Pro Tennis Championship, US	Challenger	Hard	(Japan) Yoshihito Nishioka	3–6, 2–6
Loss	0–5	Jul 2016	Lexington Challenger, US	Challenger	Hard	(United States) Ernesto Escobedo	2–6, 7–6^{(8–6)}, 6–7^{(3–7)}
Win	1–5	Aug 2016	Challenger de Granby, Canada	Challenger	Hard	(El Salvador) Marcelo Arévalo	6–1, 6–1
Win	2–5	Oct 2016	Stockton ATP Challenger, US	Challenger	Hard	(United States) Noah Rubin	6–4, 6–2
Win	3–5	Apr 2017	Sarasota Open, US	Challenger	Clay	(United States) Tennys Sandgren	6–3, 6–4
Win	4–5	May 2017	Open du Pays d'Aix, France	Challenger	Clay	(France) Jérémy Chardy	6–3, 4–6, 7–6^{(7–5)}
Win	5–5	Oct 2020	Internazionali di Tennis Emilia Romagna, Italy	Challenger	Clay	(Italy) Salvatore Caruso	6–3, 3–6, 6–4
Win	6–5	Jun 2021	Nottingham Open, UK	Challenger	Grass	(United States) Denis Kudla	6–1, 6–3

Result	W–L	Date	Tournament	Tier	Surface	Opponent	Score
Loss	0–1	Jan 2015	F5 Weston, US	Futures	Clay	(Monaco) Benjamin Balleret	5–7, 4–6
Win	1–1	Mar 2015	F10 Bakersfield, US	Futures	Hard	(France) Maxime Tabatruong	6–1, 6–2
Loss	1–2	Mar 2015	F11 Calabasas, US	Futures	Hard	(United States) Dennis Novikov	6–7^{(4–7)}, 6–7^{(6–8)}

=== Doubles: 1 (runner-up) ===
Legend ATP Challenger Tour (–) ITF Futures (0–1)

Result	W–L	Date	Tournament	Tier	Surface	Partner	Opponents	Score
Loss	0–1	Jan 2014	F2 Sunrise, US	Futures	Clay	(United States) William Blumberg	(Chinese Taipei) Jason Jung (United States) Evan King	7–6^{(7–4)}, 4–6, [6–10]

== Wins over top-10 players ==
- Tiafoe has a 19–47 (28.8%) win-loss record against players who were, at the time the match was played, ranked in the top 10.

Season	2017	2018	2019	2020	2021	2022	2023	2024	2025	2026	Total
Wins	1	1	1	0	4	2	0	4	0	6	19

#	Player	Rk	Event	Surface	Rd	Score	Rk	Ref
2017
1.	(Germany) Alexander Zverev	7	Cincinnati Open, US	Hard	2R	4–6, 6–3, 6–4	87	
2018
2.	(Argentina) Juan Martín del Potro	10	Delray Beach Open, US	Hard	2R	7–6^{(8–6)}, 4–6, 7–5	91	
2019
3.	(South Africa) Kevin Anderson	6	Australian Open, Australia	Hard	2R	4–6, 6–4, 6–4, 7–5	39	
2021
4.	(Greece) Stefanos Tsitsipas	4	Wimbledon, UK	Grass	1R	6–4, 6–4, 6–3	56	
5.	(Canada) Denis Shapovalov	10	Canadian Open, Canada	Hard	2R	6–1, 6–4	52	
6.	(Russia) Andrey Rublev	7	US Open, US	Hard	3R	4–6, 6–3, 7–6^{(8–6)}, 4–6, 6–1	50	
7.	(Greece) Stefanos Tsitsipas	3	Vienna Open, Austria	Hard (i)	2R	3–6, 6–3, 6–4	49	
2022
8.	(Spain) Rafael Nadal	3	US Open, US	Hard	4R	6–4, 4–6, 6–4, 6–3	26	
9.	(Greece) Stefanos Tsitsipas	6	Laver Cup, UK	Hard (i)	RR	1–6, 7–6^{(13–11)}, [10–8]	19	
2024
10.	Andrey Rublev	8	Washington Open, US	Hard	QF	6–4, 7–6^{(7–3)}	29	
11.	(Poland) Hubert Hurkacz	7	Cincinnati Open, US	Hard	QF	6–3, ret.	27	
12.	(Bulgaria) Grigor Dimitrov	9	US Open, US	Hard	QF	6–3, 6–7^{(5–7)}, 6–3, 4–1 ret.	20	
13.	Daniil Medvedev	5	Laver Cup, Germany	Hard (i)	RR	3–6, 6–4, [10–5]	16	
2026
14.	(Italy) Flavio Cobolli	10	Halle Open, Germany	Grass	1R	6–2, 7–6^{(7–4)}	26	
15.	(Canada) Félix Auger-Aliassime	4	Halle Open, Germany	Grass	QF	3–6, 6–3, 7–6^{(14–12)}	26	
16.	(United States) Taylor Fritz	9	Halle Open, Germany	Grass	F	6–4, 6–4	26	
17.	(Canada) Félix Auger-Aliassime	4	Cincinnati Open, US	Hard	4R	6–3, 6–4	23	
18.	Daniil Medvedev	8	US Open, US	Hard	4R	7–6^{(7–1)}, 6–4, 7–6^{(8–6)}	12	
19.	(Italy) Flavio Cobolli	6	ATP Finals, Italy	Hard (i)	RR	7–6^{(8–6)}, 6–0	8	

== Exhibition matches ==
=== Singles ===
Result	Date	Tournament	Surface	Opponent	Score
Win	Jun 2022	Giorgio Armani Tennis Classic, London, UK	Grass	(Spain) Carlos Alcaraz	6–4, 6–4
Loss	Jun 2023	Giorgio Armani Tennis Classic, London, UK	Grass	(Serbia) Novak Djokovic	3–6, 6–3, [7–10]
Win	Jun 2024	Giorgio Armani Tennis Classic, London, UK	Grass	(China) Zhang Zhizhen	7–6^{(7–5)}, 6–4
Win	Dec 2024	Charlotte Invitational, Charlotte, US	Hard (i)	(Spain) Carlos Alcaraz	5–7, 6–1, [11–9]
Loss	Mar 2025	La Batalla de Leyendas, San Juan, Puerto Rico	Hard	(Spain) Carlos Alcaraz	4–6, 6–3, 4–6
Loss	Jun 2025	Giorgio Armani Tennis Classic, London, UK	Grass	(Greece) Stefanos Tsitsipas	6–7^{(9–11)}, 7–6^{(7–4)}, [7–10]
Loss	Jun 2025	Giorgio Armani Tennis Classic, London, UK	Grass	(United States) Christopher Eubanks	3–6, 6–7^{(4–7)}
Win	Dec 2025	Charlotte Invitational, Charlotte, US	Hard (i)	(United States) Taylor Fritz	4–6, 6–4, [10–8]
Win	Dec 2025	A Racquet at the Rock, Newark, US	Hard (i)	(Spain) Carlos Alcaraz	6–3, 3–6, [10–7]
Loss	Jan 2026	Kooyong Classic, Melbourne, Australia	Hard	Karen Khachanov	4–6, 4–6
Loss	Jan 2026	Australian Open Opening Week, Melbourne, Australia	Hard	(Serbia) Novak Djokovic	3–6, 4–6

=== Mixed doubles ===
Result	Date	Tournament	Surface	Partner	Opponents	Score
Loss	Dec 2025	A Racquet at the Rock, Newark, US	Hard (i)	(United States) Amanda Anisimova	(Spain) Carlos Alcaraz (United States) Jessica Pegula	8–10
