= 2021 Emilia-Romagna Open – Men's doubles =

Men's doubles
- 2021 Emilia-Romagna Open

Final
- Champions: (Italy) Simone Bolelli (Argentina) Máximo González
- Runners-up: (Austria) Oliver Marach (Pakistan) Aisam-ul-Haq Qureshi
- Score: 6–3, 6–3

Events
Singles	men	women
Doubles	men	women
← 2020 ·	Emilia-Romagna Open	· 2022 →

This was the third edition of the tournament, primarily created due to the one-week delay of the 2021 French Open.

Simone Bolelli and Máximo González won the title, defeating Oliver Marach and Aisam-ul-Haq Qureshi in the final, 6–3, 6–3.

== Seeds ==
1. (Belgium) Sander Gillé / (Belgium) Joran Vliegen (quarterfinals, withdrew)
2. (South Africa) Raven Klaasen / (Japan) Ben McLachlan (first round)
3. (New Zealand) Marcus Daniell / (Austria) Philipp Oswald (first round)
4. (El Salvador) Marcelo Arévalo / (Netherlands) Matwé Middelkoop (quarterfinals)

== Draw ==
=== Key ===
- Q = Qualifier
- WC = Wild card
- LL = Lucky loser
- Alt = Alternate
- SE = Special exempt
- PR = Protected ranking
- ITF = ITF entry
- JE = Junior exempt
- w/o = Walkover
- r = Retired
- d = Defaulted
- SR = Special ranking

=== Draw ===
First round
1	(Belgium) S Gillé (Belgium) J Vliegen	7^{7}	6
WC	(Italy) F Passaro (Italy) S Travaglia	6^{5}	4
WC	(Spain) D Marrero (Spain) D Vega Hernández	7^{7}	2	[6]
(Czech Republic) R Jebavý (Kazakhstan) A Nedovyesov	6^{3}	6	[10]
3	(New Zealand) M Daniell (Austria) P Oswald	2	4
(Italy) S Bolelli (Argentina) M González	6	6
(Australia) M Purcell (Australia) L Saville	7^{7}	6
(Italy) M Cecchinato (Italy) A Seppi	6^{5}	4
(Monaco) R Arneodo (France) B Paire	7^{7}	6
(United States) N Monroe (United States) S Querrey	6^{4}	4
(Kazakhstan) A Golubev (Italy) A Vavassori	4	6^{4}
4	(El Salvador) M Arévalo (Netherlands) M Middelkoop	6	7^{7}
(Australia) M Reid (New Zealand) M Venus	7^{9}	6
(United States) N Lammons (United States) J Withrow	6^{7}	3
(Austria) O Marach (Pakistan) A-u-H Qureshi	6	6
2	(South Africa) R Klaasen (Japan) B McLachlan	3	4

Quarterfinals
1	(Belgium) S Gillé (Belgium) J Vliegen
(Czech Republic) R Jebavý (Kazakhstan) A Nedovyesov	w/o
(Italy) S Bolelli (Argentina) M González	6	6
(Australia) M Purcell (Australia) L Saville	3	3
(Monaco) R Arneodo (France) B Paire	6	7
4	(El Salvador) M Arévalo (Netherlands) M Middelkoop	2	5
(Australia) M Reid (New Zealand) M Venus	3	4
(Austria) O Marach (Pakistan) A-u-H Qureshi	6	6

Semifinals
(Czech Republic) R Jebavý (Kazakhstan) A Nedovyesov	1	4
(Italy) S Bolelli (Argentina) M González	6	6
(Monaco) R Arneodo (France) B Paire	3	2
(Austria) O Marach (Pakistan) A-u-H Qureshi	6	6

Final
(Italy) S Bolelli (Argentina) M González	6	6
(Austria) O Marach (Pakistan) A-u-H Qureshi	3	3
