= 2022 French Open – Day-by-day summaries =

The 2022 French Open's day-by-day summaries and order of play for main draw matches on the three main tennis courts, starting from May 22 until June 5.

All dates are in CEST.

== Day 1 (22 May) ==
- Seeds out:
  - Men's singles: (Spain) Alejandro Davidovich Fokina [25], (United States) Jenson Brooksby [31]
  - Women's singles: (Tunisia) Ons Jabeur [6], (Spain) Garbiñe Muguruza [10]
- Schedule of play

Matches on main courts
Matches on Court Philippe Chatrier (Center Court)
Event	Winner	Loser	Score
Women's singles - 1st round	(Poland) Magda Linette	(Tunisia) Ons Jabeur [6]	3–6, 7–6^{(7–4)}, 7–5
Men's singles - 1st round	(Canada) Félix Auger-Aliassime [9]	(Peru) Juan Pablo Varillas [Q]	2–6, 2–6, 6–1, 6–3, 6–3
Women's singles - 1st round	(Greece) Maria Sakkari [4]	(France) Clara Burel	6–2, 6–3
Men's singles - 1st round	(Spain) Carlos Alcaraz [6]	(Argentina) Juan Ignacio Londero [LL]	6–4, 6–2, 6–0
Matches on Court Suzanne Lenglen (Grandstand)
Event	Winner	Loser	Score
Women's singles - 1st round	(United States) Sloane Stephens	(Germany) Jule Niemeier [Q]	5–7, 6–4, 6–2
Men's singles - 1st round	(United States) John Isner [23]	(France) Quentin Halys	7–6^{(7–3)}, 4–6, 7–6^{(7–1)}, 7–6^{(8–6)}
Men's singles - 1st round	(Germany) Alexander Zverev [3]	(Austria) Sebastian Ofner [Q]	6–2, 6–4, 6–4
Women's singles - 1st round	(Canada) Leylah Fernandez [17]	(France) Kristina Mladenovic	6–0, 7–5
Matches on Court Simonne Mathieu
Event	Winner	Loser	Score
Men's singles - 1st round	(Bolivia) Hugo Dellien	(Austria) Dominic Thiem	6–3, 6–2, 6–4
Women's singles - 1st round	(Estonia) Kaia Kanepi	(Spain) Garbiñe Muguruza [10]	2–6, 6–3, 6–4
Men's singles - 1st round	(Italy) Fabio Fognini	(Australia) Alexei Popyrin	6–4, 7–5, 6–4
Women's singles - 1st round	(United States) Coco Gauff [18]	(Canada) Rebecca Marino [Q]	7–5, 6–0

== Day 2 (23 May) ==
Rain disrupted play for two hours at 1pm. The main roof was closed for the remainder of the session.

- Seeds out:
  - Men's singles: (United States) Reilly Opelka [17]
  - Women's singles: (Czech Republic) Barbora Krejčíková [2], (Estonia) Anett Kontaveit [5], Liudmila Samsonova [25]
- Schedule of play

Matches on main courts
Matches on Court Philippe Chatrier (Center Court)
Event	Winner	Loser	Score
Women's singles - 1st round	(Poland) Iga Świątek [1]	(Ukraine) Lesia Tsurenko [Q]	6–2, 6–0
Women's singles - 1st round	(France) Diane Parry	(Czech Republic) Barbora Krejčíková [2]	1–6, 6–2, 6–3
Men's singles - 1st round	(Spain) Rafael Nadal [5]	(Australia) Jordan Thompson	6–2, 6–2, 6–2
Men's singles - 1st round	(Serbia) Novak Djokovic [1]	(Japan) Yoshihito Nishioka	6–3, 6–1, 6–0
Matches on Court Suzanne Lenglen (Grandstand)
Event	Winner	Loser	Score
Women's singles - 1st round	(United States) Amanda Anisimova [27]	(Japan) Naomi Osaka	7–5, 6–4
Men's singles - 1st round	(France) Corentin Moutet [WC]	(Switzerland) Stan Wawrinka [PR]	2–6, 6–3, 7–6^{(7–2)}, 6–3
Women's singles - 1st round	(Australia) Ajla Tomljanović	(Estonia) Anett Kontaveit [5]	7–6^{(7–5)}, 7–5
Men's singles - 1st round	(South Africa) Lloyd Harris vs (France) Richard Gasquet		1–6, 2–5, suspended
Matches on Court Simonne Mathieu
Event	Winner	Loser	Score
Women's singles - 1st round	(Germany) Andrea Petkovic	(France) Océane Dodin	6–4, 6–2
Men's singles - 1st round	(United Kingdom) Cameron Norrie [10]	(France) Manuel Guinard [WC]	7–5, 6–2, 6–0
Women's singles - 1st round	(United Kingdom) Emma Raducanu [12]	(Czech Republic) Linda Nosková [Q]	6–7^{(4–7)}, 7–5, 6–1
Men's singles - 1st round	(France) Benoît Paire vs Ilya Ivashka		3–6, 2–1, suspended
Coloured background indicates a night match
Day matches began at 11 am (12 pm on Court Philippe Chatrier), whilst night match began at 8:45 pm CEST

== Day 3 (24 May) ==
- Seeds out:
  - Men's singles: (Canada) Denis Shapovalov [14], (Spain) Pablo Carreño Busta [16], (Australia) Alex de Minaur [19], (United States) Tommy Paul [30]
  - Men's doubles: (Colombia) Juan Sebastián Cabal / (Colombia) Robert Farah [5], (Australia) John Peers / (Slovakia) Filip Polášek [8], (Mexico) Santiago González / (Argentina) Andrés Molteni [13]
- Schedule of play

Matches on main courts
Matches on Court Philippe Chatrier (Center Court)
Event	Winner	Loser	Score
Women's singles - 1st round	(France) Alizé Cornet	(Japan) Misaki Doi	6–2, 6–0
Men's singles - 1st round	(Norway) Casper Ruud [8]	(France) Jo-Wilfried Tsonga [WC]	6–7^{(6–8)}, 7–6^{(7–4)}, 6–2, 7–6^{(7–0)}
Women's singles - 1st round	(Spain) Paula Badosa [3]	(France) Fiona Ferro [WC]	6–2, 6–0
Men's singles - 1st round	(Greece) Stefanos Tsitsipas [4]	(Italy) Lorenzo Musetti	5–7, 4–6, 6–2, 6–3, 6–2
Matches on Court Suzanne Lenglen (Grandstand)
Event	Winner	Loser	Score
Men's singles - 1st round	Daniil Medvedev [2]	(Argentina) Facundo Bagnis	6–2, 6–2, 6–2
Men's singles - 1st round	(France) Richard Gasquet	(South Africa) Lloyd Harris	6–1, 6–3, 6–4
Women's singles - 1st round	(France) Caroline Garcia	(United States) Taylor Townsend [PR]	6–3, 6–4
Men's singles - 1st round	(France) Hugo Gaston	(Australia) Alex de Minaur [19]	4–6, 6–2, 6–3, 0–6, 7–6^{(10–4)}
Women's singles - 1st round	Aryna Sabalenka [7]	(France) Chloé Paquet	2–6, 6–3, 6–4
Matches on Court Simonne Mathieu
Event	Winner	Loser	Score
Women's singles - 1st round	(Czech Republic) Karolína Plíšková [8]	(France) Tessah Andrianjafitrimo [WC]	2–6, 6–3, 6–1
Men's singles - 1st round	Ilya Ivashka	(France) Benoît Paire	6–3, 7–5, 1–6, 7–5
Men's singles - 1st round	(United States) Frances Tiafoe [24]	(France) Benjamin Bonzi	7–5, 7–5, 7–6^{(7–5)}
Women's singles - 1st round	(Romania) Simona Halep [19]	(Germany) Nastasja Schunk [LL]	6–4, 1–6, 6–1
Men's singles - 1st round	(France) Gilles Simon [WC]	(Spain) Pablo Carreño Busta [16]	6–4, 6–4, 4–6, 1–6, 6–4
Coloured background indicates a night match
Day matches began at 11 am (12 pm on Court Philippe Chatrier), whilst night match began at 8:45 pm CEST

== Day 4 (25 May) ==
- Seeds out:
  - Men's singles: (United States) Taylor Fritz [13]
  - Women's singles: (Greece) Maria Sakkari [4], (United Kingdom) Emma Raducanu [12], (Romania) Sorana Cîrstea, [26] (Czech Republic) Petra Kvitová [32]
  - Men's doubles: (France) Pierre-Hugues Herbert / (France) Nicolas Mahut [3], (Germany) Kevin Krawietz / (Germany) Andreas Mies [9], (Australia) Matthew Ebden / (Australia) Max Purcell [14]
  - Women's doubles: (Chile) Alexa Guarachi / (Slovenia) Andreja Klepač [6], (United States) Nicole Melichar-Martinez / (Australia) Ellen Perez [16]
- Schedule of play

Matches on main courts
Matches on Court Philippe Chatrier (Center Court)
Event	Winner	Loser	Score
Women's singles - 2nd round	(Germany) Angelique Kerber [21]	(France) Elsa Jacquemot [WC]	6–1, 7–6^{(7–2)}
Men's singles - 2nd round	(Germany) Alexander Zverev [3]	(Argentina) Sebastián Báez	2–6, 4–6, 6–1, 6–2, 7–5
Women's singles - 2nd round	(Switzerland) Belinda Bencic [14]	(Canada) Bianca Andreescu [PR]	6–2, 6–4
Men's singles - 2nd round	(Spain) Rafael Nadal [5]	(France) Corentin Moutet [WC]	6–1, 6–3, 6–4
Matches on Court Suzanne Lenglen (Grandstand)
Event	Winner	Loser	Score
Women's singles - 2nd round	Aliaksandra Sasnovich	(United Kingdom) Emma Raducanu [12]	3–6, 6–1, 6–1
Women's singles - 2nd round	(Czech Republic) Karolína Muchová	(Greece) Maria Sakkari [4]	7–6^{(7–5)}, 7–6^{(7–4)}
Men's singles - 2nd round	(Serbia) Novak Djokovic [1]	(Slovakia) Alex Molčan	6–2, 6–3, 7–6^{(7–4)}
Men's singles - 2nd round	(United States) Sebastian Korda [27]	(France) Richard Gasquet	7–6^{(7–5)}, 6–3, 6–3
Matches on Court Simonne Mathieu
Event	Winner	Loser	Score
Men's singles - 2nd round	(United States) John Isner [23]	(France) Grégoire Barrère [WC]	6–4, 6–4, 3–6, 7–6^{(7–5)}
Women's singles - 2nd round	(United States) Coco Gauff [18]	(Belgium) Alison Van Uytvanck	6–1, 7–6^{(7–4)}
Men's singles - 2nd round	(Spain) Carlos Alcaraz [6]	(Spain) Albert Ramos Viñolas	6–1, 6–7^{(7–9)}, 5–7, 7–6^{(7–2)}, 6–4
Women's singles - 2nd round	(France) Diane Parry	(Colombia) Camila Osorio	6–3, 6–3
Coloured background indicates a night match
Day matches began at 11 am (12 pm on Court Philippe Chatrier), whilst night match began at 8:45 pm CEST

== Day 5 (26 May) ==
- Seeds out:
  - Men's singles: (Georgia (country)) Nikoloz Basilashvili [22], (United States) Frances Tiafoe [24], (United Kingdom) Dan Evans [29]
  - Women's singles: (Czech Republic) Karolína Plíšková [8], (United States) Danielle Collins [9], (Latvia) Jeļena Ostapenko [13], (Romania) Simona Halep [19], Ekaterina Alexandrova [30]
  - Men's doubles: (Argentina) Máximo González / (Brazil) Marcelo Melo [15]
  - Women's doubles: (Japan) Shuko Aoyama / (Chinese Taipei) Chan Hao-ching [11], (Poland) Magda Linette / (United States) Bernarda Pera [15]
  - Mixed doubles: (China) Zhang Shuai / (France) Nicolas Mahut [1], (Kazakhstan) Anna Danilina / (Kazakhstan) Andrey Golubev [6], (United States) Bernarda Pera / (Croatia) Mate Pavić [7], (Mexico) Giuliana Olmos / (El Salvador) Marcelo Arévalo [8]
- Schedule of play

Matches on main courts
Matches on Court Philippe Chatrier (Center Court)
Event	Winner	Loser	Score
Men's singles - 2nd round	Daniil Medvedev [2]	(Serbia) Laslo Đere	6–3, 6–4, 6–3
Women's singles - 2nd round	(United States) Madison Keys [22]	(France) Caroline Garcia	6–4, 7–6^{(7–3)}
Men's singles - 2nd round	(France) Gilles Simon [WC]	(United States) Steve Johnson	7–5, 6–1, 7–6^{(8–6)}
Women's singles - 2nd round	(France) Alizé Cornet	(Latvia) Jeļena Ostapenko [13]	6–0, 1–6, 6–3
Matches on Court Suzanne Lenglen (Grandstand)
Event	Winner	Loser	Score
Women's singles - 2nd round	(Spain) Paula Badosa [3]	(Slovenia) Kaja Juvan	7–5, 3–6, 6–2
Men's singles - 2nd round	(France) Hugo Gaston	(Argentina) Pedro Cachin [LL]	6–4, 6–2, 6–4
Women's singles - 2nd round	(Poland) Iga Świątek [1]	(United States) Alison Riske	6–0, 6–2
Men's singles - 2nd round	(Greece) Stefanos Tsitsipas [4]	(Czech Republic) Zdeněk Kolář [Q]	6–3, 7–6^{(10–8)}, 6–7^{(3–7)}, 7–6^{(9–7)}
Matches on Court Simonne Mathieu
Event	Winner	Loser	Score
Women's singles - 2nd round	(France) Léolia Jeanjean [WC]	(Czech Republic) Karolína Plíšková [8]	6–2, 6–2
Men's singles - 2nd round	(Belgium) David Goffin	(United States) Frances Tiafoe [24]	3–6, 7–6^{(7–1)}, 6–2, 6–4
Women's singles - 2nd round	(China) Zheng Qinwen	(Romania) Simona Halep [19]	2–6, 6–2, 6–1
Men's singles - 2nd round	Andrey Rublev [7]	(Argentina) Federico Delbonis	6–3, 3–6, 6–2, 6–3
Coloured background indicates a night match
Day matches began at 11 am (12 pm on Court Philippe Chatrier), whilst night match began at 8:45 pm CEST

== Day 6 (27 May) ==
- Seeds out:
  - Men's singles: (United Kingdom) Cameron Norrie [10], (Bulgaria) Grigor Dimitrov [18], (United States) John Isner [23], (Netherlands) Botic van de Zandschulp [26], (United States) Sebastian Korda [27]
  - Women's singles: (Switzerland) Belinda Bencic [14], Victoria Azarenka [15], (Germany) Angelique Kerber [21]
  - Men's doubles: (United Kingdom) Jamie Murray / (Brazil) Bruno Soares [10]
  - Women's doubles: (United States) Desirae Krawczyk / (Netherlands) Demi Schuurs [5], (United States) Caroline Dolehide / (Australia) Storm Sanders [7], (Kazakhstan) Anna Danilina / (Brazil) Beatriz Haddad Maia [12]
- Schedule of play

Matches on main courts
Matches on Court Philippe Chatrier (Center Court)
Event	Winner	Loser	Score
Women's singles - 3rd round	(Canada) Leylah Fernandez [17]	(Switzerland) Belinda Bencic [14]	7–5, 3–6, 7–5
Men's singles - 3rd round	(Serbia) Novak Djokovic [1]	(Slovenia) Aljaž Bedene [PR]	6–3, 6–3, 6–2
Women's singles - 3rd round	(United States) Sloane Stephens	(France) Diane Parry	6–2, 6–3
Men's singles - 3rd round	(Spain) Carlos Alcaraz [6]	(United States) Sebastian Korda [27]	6–4, 6–4, 6–2
Matches on Court Suzanne Lenglen (Grandstand)
Event	Winner	Loser	Score
Women's singles - 3rd round	(United States) Amanda Anisimova [27]	(Czech Republic) Karolína Muchová	6–7^{(7–9)}, 6–2, 3–0, retired
Women's singles - 3rd round	(United States) Coco Gauff [18]	(Estonia) Kaia Kanepi	6–3, 6–4
Men's singles - 3rd round	(Spain) Rafael Nadal [5]	(Netherlands) Botic van de Zandschulp [26]	6–3, 6–2, 6–4
Men's singles - 3rd round	(Germany) Alexander Zverev [3]	(United States) Brandon Nakashima	7–6^{(7–2)}, 6–3, 7–6^{(7–5)}
Matches on Court Simonne Mathieu
Event	Winner	Loser	Score
Men's singles - 3rd round	(Argentina) Diego Schwartzman [15]	(Bulgaria) Grigor Dimitrov [18]	6–3, 6–1, 6–2
Women's singles - 3rd round	Aliaksandra Sasnovich	(Germany) Angelique Kerber [21]	6–4, 7–6^{(7–5)}
Women's singles - 3rd round	(Switzerland) Jil Teichmann [23]	Victoria Azarenka [15]	4–6, 7–5, 7–6^{(10–5)}
Men's singles - 3rd round	Karen Khachanov [21]	(United Kingdom) Cameron Norrie [10]	6–2, 7–5, 5–7, 6–4
Coloured background indicates a night match
Day matches began at 11 am (12 pm on Court Philippe Chatrier), whilst night match began at 8:45 pm CEST

== Day 7 (28 May) ==
- Seeds out:
  - Men's singles: (Serbia) Miomir Kecmanović [28], (Italy) Lorenzo Sonego [32]
  - Women's singles: (Spain) Paula Badosa [3], Aryna Sabalenka [7], (Kazakhstan) Elena Rybakina [16], (Slovenia) Tamara Zidanšek [24]
  - Men's doubles: (Croatia) Nikola Mektić / (Croatia) Mate Pavić [2]
- Schedule of play

Matches on main courts
Matches on Court Philippe Chatrier (Center Court)
Event	Winner	Loser	Score
Women's singles - 3rd round	(Poland) Iga Świątek [1]	(Montenegro) Danka Kovinić	6–3, 7–5
Women's singles - 3rd round	(China) Zheng Qinwen	(France) Alizé Cornet	6–0, 3–0, retired
Men's singles - 3rd round	(Croatia) Marin Čilić [20]	(France) Gilles Simon [WC]	6–0, 6–3, 6–2
Women's doubles - 2nd round	Veronika Kudermetova [2] (Belgium) Elise Mertens [2]	(Canada) Leylah Fernandez (Belgium) Kirsten Flipkens	6–2, 6–2
Men's singles - 3rd round	(Denmark) Holger Rune	(France) Hugo Gaston	6–3, 6–3, 6–3
Matches on Court Suzanne Lenglen (Grandstand)
Event	Winner	Loser	Score
Women's singles - 3rd round	(Romania) Irina-Camelia Begu	(France) Léolia Jeanjean [WC]	6–1, 6–4
Men's singles - 3rd round	Daniil Medvedev [2]	(Serbia) Miomir Kecmanović [28]	6–2, 6–4, 6–2
Women's singles - 3rd round	Veronika Kudermetova [29]	(Spain) Paula Badosa [3]	6–3, 2–1, retired
Men's singles - 3rd round	(Greece) Stefanos Tsitsipas [4]	(Sweden) Mikael Ymer	6–2, 6–2, 6–1
Matches on Court Simonne Mathieu
Event	Winner	Loser	Score
Men's singles - 3rd round	(Italy) Jannik Sinner [11]	(United States) Mackenzie McDonald	6–3, 7–6^{(8–6)}, 6–3
Women's singles - 3rd round	(Italy) Camila Giorgi [28]	Aryna Sabalenka [7]	4–6, 6–1, 6–0
Men's singles - 3rd round	(Poland) Hubert Hurkacz [12]	(Belgium) David Goffin	7–5, 6–2, 6–1
Women's singles - 3rd round	(United States) Madison Keys [22]	(Kazakhstan) Elena Rybakina [16]	3–6, 6–1, 7–6^{(10–3)}
Coloured background indicates a night match
Day matches began at 11 am (12 pm on Court Philippe Chatrier), whilst nighttime match began at 8:45 pm CEST

== Day 8 (29 May) ==
- Seeds out:
  - Men's singles: (Canada) Félix Auger-Aliassime [9], (Argentina) Diego Schwartzman [15], Karen Khachanov [21]
  - Women's singles: (Switzerland) Jil Teichmann [23], (United States) Amanda Anisimova [27], (Belgium) Elise Mertens [31]
  - Men's doubles: (Germany) Tim Pütz / (New Zealand) Michael Venus [7]
  - Women's doubles: (Canada) Gabriela Dabrowski / (Mexico) Giuliana Olmos [3], (United States) Caty McNally / (China) Zhang Shuai [4], (United States) Asia Muhammad / (Japan) Ena Shibahara [9]
  - Mixed doubles: (Slovenia) Andreja Klepač / (India) Rohan Bopanna [5]
- Schedule of play

Matches on main courts
Matches on Court Philippe Chatrier (Center Court)
Event	Winner	Loser	Score
Women's singles - 4th round	(Canada) Leylah Fernandez [17]	(United States) Amanda Anisimova [27]	6–3, 4–6, 6–3
Women's singles - 4th round	(United States) Coco Gauff [18]	(Belgium) Elise Mertens [31]	6–4, 6–0
Men's singles - 4th round	(Spain) Rafael Nadal [5]	(Canada) Félix Auger-Aliassime [9]	3–6, 6–3, 6–2, 3–6, 6–3
Men's singles - 4th round	(Spain) Carlos Alcaraz [6]	Karen Khachanov [21]	6–1, 6–4, 6–4
Matches on Court Suzanne Lenglen (Grandstand)
Event	Winner	Loser	Score
Women's singles - 4th round	(Italy) Martina Trevisan	Aliaksandra Sasnovich	7–6^{(12–10)}, 7–5
Men's singles - 4th round	(Serbia) Novak Djokovic [1]	(Argentina) Diego Schwartzman [15]	6–1, 6–3, 6–3
Men's singles - 4th round	(Germany) Alexander Zverev [3]	(Spain) Bernabé Zapata Miralles [Q]	7–6^{(13–11)}, 7–5, 6–3
Women's singles - 4th round	(United States) Sloane Stephens	(Switzerland) Jil Teichmann [23]	6–2, 6–0
Matches on Court Simonne Mathieu
Event	Winner	Loser	Score
Men's doubles - 3rd round	(Spain) Marcel Granollers [4] (Argentina) Horacio Zeballos [4]	(United Kingdom) Jonny O'Mara [Alt] (United States) Jackson Withrow [Alt]	6–1, 6–1
Women's doubles - 3rd round	(France) Caroline Garcia [WC] (France) Kristina Mladenovic [WC]	(Japan) Misaki Doi (Australia) Ajla Tomljanović	5–7, 6–4, 6–2
Mixed doubles - 2nd round	(Norway) Ulrikke Eikeri (Belgium) Joran Vliegen	(France) Clara Burel [WC] (France) Hugo Gaston [WC]	6–4, 6–3
Women's doubles - 3rd round	(Belgium) Maryna Zanevska (Belgium) Kimberley Zimmermann	(Chinese Taipei) Latisha Chan (Australia) Samantha Stosur	1–6, 6–3, 6–4
Mixed doubles - 2nd round	(Czech Republic) Lucie Hradecká (Ecuador) Gonzalo Escobar	(Slovenia) Andreja Klepač [5] (India) Rohan Bopanna [5]	7–6^{(7–2)}, 6–4
Coloured background indicates a night match
Day matches began at 11 am (12 pm on Court Philippe Chatrier), whilst night match began at 8:45 pm CEST

== Day 9 (30 May) ==
- Seeds out:
  - Men's singles: Daniil Medvedev [2], (Greece) Stefanos Tsitsipas [4], (Italy) Jannik Sinner [11], (Poland) Hubert Hurkacz [12]
  - Women's singles: (United States) Madison Keys [22], (Italy) Camila Giorgi [28]
  - Women's doubles: Veronika Kudermetova / (Belgium) Elise Mertens [2]
  - Mixed doubles: (United States) Desirae Krawczyk / (United Kingdom) Neal Skupski [4]
- Schedule of play

Matches on main courts
Matches on Court Philippe Chatrier (Center Court)
Event	Winner	Loser	Score
Women's singles - 4th round	Veronika Kudermetova [29]	(United States) Madison Keys [22]	1–6, 6–3, 6–1
Men's singles - 4th round	(Denmark) Holger Rune	(Greece) Stefanos Tsitsipas [4]	7–5, 3–6, 6–3, 6–4
Women's singles - 4th round	(Poland) Iga Świątek [1]	(China) Zheng Qinwen	6–7^{(5–7)}, 6–0, 6–2
Men's singles - 4th round	(Croatia) Marin Čilić [20]	Daniil Medvedev [2]	6–2, 6–3, 6–2
Matches on Court Suzanne Lenglen (Grandstand)
Event	Winner	Loser	Score
Women's singles - 4th round	Daria Kasatkina [20]	(Italy) Camila Giorgi [28]	6–2, 6–2
Men's singles - 4th round	(Norway) Casper Ruud [8]	(Poland) Hubert Hurkacz [12]	6–2, 6–3, 3–6, 6–3
Women's singles - 4th round	(United States) Jessica Pegula [11]	(Romania) Irina-Camelia Begu	4–6, 6–2, 6–3
Men's singles - 4th round	Andrey Rublev [7]	(Italy) Jannik Sinner [11]	1–6, 6–4, 2–0, retired
Matches on Court Simonne Mathieu
Event	Winner	Loser	Score
Coloured background indicates a night match
Day matches began at 11 am (12 pm on Court Philippe Chatrier), whilst night match began at 8:45 pm CEST

== Day 10 (31 May) ==
- Seeds out:
  - Men's singles: (Serbia) Novak Djokovic [1], (Spain) Carlos Alcaraz [6]
  - Women's singles: (Canada) Leylah Fernandez [17]
  - Men's doubles: (United States) Rajeev Ram / (United Kingdom) Joe Salisbury [1], (Netherlands) Wesley Koolhof / (United Kingdom) Neal Skupski [6]
  - Women's doubles: (Czech Republic) Lucie Hradecká / (India) Sania Mirza [10]
- Schedule of play

Matches on main courts
Matches on Court Philippe Chatrier (Center Court)
Event	Winner	Loser	Score
Women's singles - Quarterfinals	(Italy) Martina Trevisan	(Canada) Leylah Fernandez [17]	6–2, 6–7^{(3–7)}, 6–3
Women's singles - Quarterfinals	(United States) Coco Gauff [18]	(United States) Sloane Stephens	7–5, 6–2
Men's singles - Quarterfinals	(Germany) Alexander Zverev [3]	(Spain) Carlos Alcaraz [6]	6–4, 6–4, 4–6, 7–6^{(9–7)}
Men's singles - Quarterfinals	(Spain) Rafael Nadal [5]	(Serbia) Novak Djokovic [1]	6–2, 4–6, 6–2, 7–6^{(7–4)}
Matches on Court Suzanne Lenglen (Grandstand)
Event	Winner	Loser	Score
Matches on Court Simonne Mathieu
Event	Winner	Loser	Score
Coloured backdrop indicates a night match
Day matches began at 11 am (12 pm on Court Philippe Chatrier), whilst night match began at 8:45 pm CEST

== Day 11 (1 June) ==
- Seeds out:
  - Men's singles: Andrey Rublev [7]
  - Women's singles: (United States) Jessica Pegula [11], Veronika Kudermetova [29]
  - Women's doubles: (China) Xu Yifan / (China) Yang Zhaoxuan [13]
  - Mixed doubles: (Canada) Gabriela Dabrowski / (Australia) John Peers [3]
- Schedule of play

Matches on main courts
Matches on Court Philippe Chatrier (Center Court)
Event	Winner	Loser	Score
Women's singles - Quarterfinals	Daria Kasatkina [20]	Veronika Kudermetova [29]	6–4, 7–6^{(7–5)}
Women's singles - Quarterfinals	(Poland) Iga Świątek [1]	(United States) Jessica Pegula [11]	6–3, 6–2
Men's singles - Quarterfinals	(Croatia) Marin Čilić [20]	Andrey Rublev [7]	5–7, 6–3, 6–4, 3–6, 7–6^{(10–2)}
Men's singles - Quarterfinals	(Norway) Casper Ruud [8]	(Denmark) Holger Rune	6–1, 4–6, 7–6^{(7–2)}, 6–3
Matches on Court Suzanne Lenglen (Grandstand)
Event	Winner	Loser	Score
Matches on Court Simonne Mathieu
Event	Winner	Loser	Score
Coloured background indicates a night match
Day matches began at 11 am (12 pm on Court Philippe Chatrier), whilst night match began at 8:45 pm CEST

== Day 12 (2 June) ==
- Seeds out:
  - Women's singles: Daria Kasatkina [20]
  - Men's doubles: (Spain) Marcel Granollers / (Argentina) Horacio Zeballos [4], (India) Rohan Bopanna / (Netherlands) Matwé Middelkoop [16]
- Schedule of play

Matches on main courts
Matches on Court Philippe Chatrier (Center Court)
Event	Winner	Loser	Score
Mixed doubles - Final	(Japan) Ena Shibahara [2] (Netherlands) Wesley Koolhof [2]	(Norway) Ulrikke Eikeri (Belgium) Joran Vliegen	7–6^{(7–5)}, 6–2
Women's singles - Semifinals	(Poland) Iga Świątek [1]	Daria Kasatkina [20]	6–2, 6–1
Women's singles - Semifinals	(United States) Coco Gauff [18]	(Italy) Martina Trevisan	6–3, 6–1
Matches on Court Suzanne Lenglen (Grandstand)
Event	Winner	Loser	Score
Matches on Court Simonne Mathieu
Event	Winner	Loser	Score
Matches began at 11 am CEST (12 pm on Court Philippe Chatrier and Court Suzanne Lenglen)

== Day 13 (3 June) ==
- Seeds out:
  - Men's singles: (Germany) Alexander Zverev [3], (Croatia) Marin Čilić [20]
  - Women's doubles: (Ukraine) Lyudmyla Kichenok / (Latvia) Jeļena Ostapenko [14]
- Schedule of play

Matches on main courts
Matches on Court Philippe Chatrier (Center Court)
Event	Winner	Loser	Score
Wheelchair men's doubles Semifinals	(Argentina) Gustavo Fernández (Japan) Shingo Kunieda	(France) Stéphane Houdet [2] (France) Nicolas Peifer [2]	7–6^{(7–0)}, 6–1
Men's singles - Semifinals	(Spain) Rafael Nadal [5]	(Germany) Alexander Zverev [3]	7–6^{(10–8)}, 6–6, retired
Men's singles - Semifinals	(Norway) Casper Ruud [8]	(Croatia) Marin Čilić [20]	3–6, 6–4, 6–2, 6–2
Matches began at 11 am CEST

== Day 14 (4 June) ==
- Seeds out:
  - Women's singles: (United States) Coco Gauff [18]
- Schedule of play

Matches on main courts
Matches on Court Philippe Chatrier (Center Court)
Event	Winner	Loser	Score
Wheelchair women's singles Final	(Netherlands) Diede de Groot [1]	(Japan) Yui Kamiji [2]	6–4, 6–1
Women's singles - Final	(Poland) Iga Świątek [1]	(United States) Coco Gauff [18]	6–1, 6–3
Men's doubles - Final	(El Salvador) Marcelo Arévalo [12] (Netherlands) Jean-Julien Rojer [12]	(Croatia) Ivan Dodig (United States) Austin Krajicek	6–7^{(4–7)}, 7–6^{(7–5)}, 6–3
Matches began at 11 am CEST

== Day 15 (5 June) ==
- Seeds out:
  - Men's singles: (Norway) Casper Ruud [8]
  - Women's doubles: (United States) Coco Gauff / (United States) Jessica Pegula [8]
- Schedule of play

Matches on main courts
Matches on Court Philippe Chatrier (Center Court)
Event	Winner	Loser	Score
Women's doubles - Final	(France) Caroline Garcia [WC] (France) Kristina Mladenovic [WC]	(United States) Coco Gauff [8] (United States) Jessica Pegula [8]	2–6, 6–3, 6–2
Men's singles - Final	(Spain) Rafael Nadal [5]	(Norway) Casper Ruud [8]	6–3, 6–3, 6–0
Matches began at 11 am CEST
