= 2021 Emilia-Romagna Open =

- Date: 16–22 May (women); 23–29 May (men)
- Edition: 3rd (men); 1st (women)
- Category: ATP Tour 250; WTA 250
- Draw: 28S/16D (men); 32S/24Q/16D (women)
- Prize money: €480,000 (men) $235,238 (women)
- Surface: Clay
- Location: Parma, Italy
- Venue: Tennis Club Parma (women); Tennis Club President di Montechiarugolo (men)

Champions

Men's singles
- (United States) Sebastian Korda

Women's singles
- (United States) Coco Gauff

Men's doubles
- (Italy) Simone Bolelli / (Argentina) Máximo González

Women's doubles
- (United States) Coco Gauff / (United States) Caty McNally
← 2020 ·	Emilia-Romagna Open	· 2022 →

The 2021 Emilia-Romagna Open was a tennis tournament played on clay courts. It was the 1st edition of the event for male and female professional tennis players, respectively. It was part of the 2021 ATP Tour and the 2021 WTA Tour and took place in Parma, Italy.

== Champions ==
=== Men's singles ===
- (United States) Sebastian Korda def. (Italy) Marco Cecchinato 6–2, 6–4

=== Women's singles ===
- (United States) Coco Gauff def. (China) Wang Qiang 6–1, 6–3

=== Men's doubles ===
- (Italy) Simone Bolelli / (Argentina) Máximo González def. (Austria) Oliver Marach / (Pakistan) Aisam-ul-Haq Qureshi 6–3, 6–3

=== Women's doubles ===
- (United States) Coco Gauff / (United States) Caty McNally def. (Croatia) Darija Jurak / (Slovenia) Andreja Klepač 6–3, 6–2

== Points and prize money ==
=== Point distribution ===
Event	W	F	SF	QF	Round of 16	Round of 32	Q	Q2	Q1
Singles	250	150	90	45	20	0	12	6	0
Doubles	250	150	90	45	0	—	—	—	—

=== Prize money ===
Event	W	F	SF	QF	Round of 16	Round of 32	Q2	Q1
Singles	€47,080	€33,760	€24,030	€16,020	€10,300	€6,195	€3,025	€1,575
Doubles*	€17,570	€12,590	€8,290	€5,390	€3,160	—	—	—

_{*per team}

== ATP singles main-draw entrants ==
=== Seeds ===
Country	Player	Rank^{1}	Seed
ITA	Lorenzo Sonego	28	1
FRA	Benoît Paire	36	2
ESP	Albert Ramos Viñolas	39	3
GER	Jan-Lennard Struff	42	4
FRA	Richard Gasquet	52	5
USA	Tommy Paul	53	6
SLO	Aljaž Bedene	55	7
JPN	Yoshihito Nishioka	60	8

- ^{1} Rankings are as of May 17, 2021.

=== Other entrants ===
The following players received wildcards into the main draw:

- (Italy) Marco Cecchinato
- (Italy) Flavio Cobolli
- (Italy) Andreas Seppi

The following players received entry from the qualifying draw:

- (Germany) Daniel Altmaier
- (Italy) Raúl Brancaccio
- (Spain) Pedro Martínez
- (Sweden) Mikael Ymer

The following player received entry as a lucky loser:

- (Slovakia) Norbert Gombos

=== Withdrawals ===
Before the tournament

- (South Africa) Lloyd Harris → replaced by (Italy) Lorenzo Musetti
- (United States) John Isner → replaced by (Italy) Salvatore Caruso
- (United Kingdom) Cameron Norrie → replaced by (United States) Marcos Giron
- (United States) Reilly Opelka → replaced by (United States) Steve Johnson
- (United States) Frances Tiafoe → replaced by (Slovakia) Norbert Gombos

=== Retirements ===
- (France) Benoît Paire

== ATP doubles main-draw entrants ==
=== Seeds ===
Country	Player	Country	Player	Rank^{1}	Seed
BEL	Sander Gillé	BEL	Joran Vliegen	62	1
RSA	Raven Klaasen	JPN	Ben McLachlan	67	2
NZL	Marcus Daniell	AUT	Philipp Oswald	74	3
ESA	Marcelo Arévalo	NED	Matwé Middelkoop	78	4

- Rankings are as of 18 May 2021

=== Other entrants ===
The following pairs received wildcards into the doubles main draw:

- (Spain) David Marrero / (Spain) David Vega Hernández
- (Italy) Francesco Passaro / (Italy) Stefano Travaglia

=== Withdrawals ===
Before the tournament

- (Czech Republic) Roman Jebavý / (Czech Republic) Jiří Veselý → replaced by (Czech Republic) Roman Jebavý / (Kazakhstan) Aleksandr Nedovyesov
- (Australia) John Peers / (New Zealand) Michael Venus → replaced by (Australia) Matt Reid / (New Zealand) Michael Venus
- (United Kingdom) Ken Skupski / (United Kingdom) Neal Skupski → replaced by (Italy) Marco Cecchinato / (Italy) Andreas Seppi

During the tournament

- (Belgium) Sander Gillé / (Belgium) Joran Vliegen

== WTA singles main-draw entrants ==
=== Seeds ===
Country	Player	Rank^{1}	Seed
USA	Serena Williams	8	1
CRO	Petra Martić	25	2
USA	Coco Gauff	35	3
RUS	Daria Kasatkina	37	4
USA	Amanda Anisimova	39	5
CHN	Wang Qiang	48	6
ESP	Sara Sorribes Tormo	51	7
FRA	Caroline Garcia	56	8

- ^{1} Rankings are as of 10 May 2021.

=== Other entrants ===
The following players received wildcards into the main draw:

- (Italy) Sara Errani
- (Italy) Giulia Gatto-Monticone
- (United States) Serena Williams
- (United States) Venus Williams

The following players received entry from the qualifying draw:

- (Italy) Martina Di Giuseppe
- (Germany) Anna-Lena Friedsam
- (United States) Caty McNally
- (Argentina) Paula Ormaechea
- (Italy) Lisa Pigato
- (Slovakia) Anna Karolína Schmiedlová

The following player received entry as a lucky loser:

- (Russia) Liudmila Samsonova

=== Withdrawals ===
Before the tournament

- (Canada) Bianca Andreescu → replaced by (Italy) Camila Giorgi
- (Czech Republic) Marie Bouzková → replaced by (Japan) Nao Hibino
- (France) Alizé Cornet → replaced by (Italy) Jasmine Paolini
- (United States) Madison Keys → replaced by (Denmark) Clara Tauson
- (Russia) Veronika Kudermetova → replaced by (Romania) Ana Bogdan
- (United States) Jessica Pegula → replaced by (Russia) Varvara Gracheva
- (United States) Alison Riske → replaced by (Russia) Liudmila Samsonova
- (Switzerland) Jil Teichmann → replaced by (Switzerland) Viktorija Golubic
- (Ukraine) Dayana Yastremska → replaced by (Japan) Misaki Doi

=== Retirements ===
- (Spain) Sara Sorribes Tormo

== WTA doubles main-draw entrants ==
=== Seeds ===
Country	Player	Country	Player	Rank^{1}	Seed
CHI	Alexa Guarachi	USA	Desirae Krawczyk	34	1
CRO	Darija Jurak	SLO	Andreja Klepač	70	2
JPN	Misaki Doi	TPE	Hsieh Su-wei	83	3
USA	Coco Gauff	USA	Caty McNally	84	4

- Rankings are as of 10 May 2021

=== Other entrants ===
The following pairs received wildcards into the doubles main draw:

- (Italy) Nuria Brancaccio / (Italy) Lisa Pigato
- (Italy) Jessica Pieri / (Italy) Bianca Turati

The following pair received entry into the doubles main draw using a protected ranking:

- (Switzerland) Viktorija Golubic / (Russia) Alexandra Panova

=== Withdrawals ===
Before the tournament

- (United States) Hayley Carter / (Brazil) Luisa Stefani → replaced by (Germany) Vivian Heisen / (China) Wang Yafan
- (Russia) Alla Kudryavtseva / (Russia) Valeria Savinykh → replaced by (United Kingdom) Eden Silva / (Belgium) Kimberley Zimmermann
- (Australia) Arina Rodionova / (Kazakhstan) Anna Danilina → replaced by (United States) Quinn Gleason / (New Zealand) Erin Routliffe
