= 2020 Internazionali di Tennis Emilia Romagna – Singles =

Singles
- 2020 Internazionali di Tennis Emilia Romagna

Final
- Champion: (United States) Frances Tiafoe
- Runner-up: (Italy) Salvatore Caruso
- Score: 6–3, 3–6, 6–4

Events
Singles	Doubles
← 2019 ·	Internazionali di Tennis Emilia Romagna	· 2021 →

Tommy Robredo was the defending champion but chose not to defend his title.

Frances Tiafoe won the title after defeating Salvatore Caruso 6–3, 3–6, 6–4 in the final.

== Seeds ==
1. (United States) Frances Tiafoe (champion)
2. (Argentina) Juan Ignacio Londero (first round, retired)
3. (Serbia) Laslo Đere (quarterfinals)
4. (Argentina) Federico Delbonis (semifinals)
5. (Italy) Salvatore Caruso (final)
6. (Germany) Philipp Kohlschreiber (second round)
7. (Italy) Gianluca Mager (second round, retired)
8. (South Africa) Lloyd Harris (withdrew)

== Draw ==
=== Key ===
- Q = Qualifier
- WC = Wild card
- LL = Lucky loser
- Alt = Alternate
- SE = Special exempt
- PR = Protected ranking
- ITF = ITF entry
- JE = Junior exempt
- w/o = Walkover
- r = Retired
- d = Defaulted
- SR = Special ranking

=== Finals ===
Semifinals
1	(United States) Frances Tiafoe	3	6	6
4	(Argentina) Federico Delbonis	6	3	4
5	(Italy) Salvatore Caruso	6	6
(Australia) Alexei Popyrin	4	4

Final
1	(United States) Frances Tiafoe	6	3	6
5	(Italy) Salvatore Caruso	3	6	4

=== Top half ===
First round
1	(United States) F Tiafoe	7^{7}	6
(Slovenia) B Rola	6^{1}	3
(Italy) F Gaio	3	2
WC	(Italy) L Musetti	6	6
(Japan) T Daniel	7	6^{5}	1
Q	(Italy) F Baldi	5	7^{7}	6
(Germany) Y Hanfmann	5	6^{5}
7	(Italy) G Mager	7	7^{7}
4	(Argentina) F Delbonis	6	7^{8}
(Italy) A Seppi	1	6^{6}
(India) P Gunneswaran	6^{5}	2
(Italy) P Lorenzi	7^{7}	6
WC	(Italy) M Cecchinato	6	6
(Poland) K Majchrzak	3	4
(Brazil) T Seyboth Wild	3	1
6	(Germany) P Kohlschreiber	6	6

Second round
1	(United States) F Tiafoe	6	3	6
WC	(Italy) L Musetti	3	6	3
Q	(Italy) F Baldi	4	6	3
7	(Italy) G Mager	6	3	1^{r}
4	(Argentina) F Delbonis	6	6
(Italy) P Lorenzi	1	4
WC	(Italy) M Cecchinato	7	6
6	(Germany) P Kohlschreiber	5	3

Quarterfinals
1	(United States) F Tiafoe	7^{7}	7
Q	(Italy) F Baldi	6^{3}	5
4	(Argentina) F Delbonis	4	6	6
WC	(Italy) M Cecchinato	6	2	2

Semifinals
1	(United States) F Tiafoe	3	6	6
4	(Argentina) F Delbonis	6	3	4

=== Bottom half ===
First round
5	(Italy) S Caruso	4	6	6
Q	(France) H Grenier	6	3	4
(Peru) JP Varillas	2	2^{r}
Q	(Czech Republic) T Macháč	6	4
WC	(Italy) G Zeppieri	4	4
(India) S Nagal	6	6
(Chinese Taipei) J Jung	2	4
3	(Serbia) L Đere	6	6
LL	(Argentina) JP Ficovich	6	7^{7}
(Serbia) D Petrović	3	6^{5}
SE	(Uzbekistan) D Istomin	4	4
Alt	(United States) M Krueger	6	6
Q	(France) A Müller	6	4	6
SE	(United States) M Cressy	3	6	3
(Australia) A Popyrin	1	2
2	(Argentina) JI Londero	6	1^{r}

Second round
5	(Italy) S Caruso	6	7
Q	(Czech Republic) T Macháč	2	5
(India) S Nagal	5	6	4
3	(Serbia) L Đere	7	4	6
LL	(Argentina) JP Ficovich	6	6
Alt	(United States) M Krueger	1	4
Q	(France) A Müller	4	4
(Australia) A Popyrin	6	6

Quarterfinals
5	(Italy) S Caruso	6	2	6
3	(Serbia) L Đere	4	6	4
LL	(Argentina) JP Ficovich	7^{8}	4	5
(Australia) A Popyrin	6^{6}	6	7

Semifinals
5	(Italy) S Caruso	6	6
(Australia) A Popyrin	4	4
