= 2020 Internazionali di Tennis Emilia Romagna – Doubles =

Doubles
- 2020 Internazionali di Tennis Emilia Romagna

Final
- Champions: (El Salvador) Marcelo Arévalo (Bosnia and Herzegovina) Tomislav Brkić
- Runners-up: (Uruguay) Ariel Behar (Ecuador) Gonzalo Escobar
- Score: 6–4, 6–4

Events
Singles	Doubles
- Internazionali di Tennis Emilia Romagna

Laurynas Grigelis and Andrea Pellegrino were the defending champions but chose not to defend their title.

Marcelo Arévalo and Tomislav Brkić won the title after defeating Ariel Behar and Gonzalo Escobar 6–4, 6–4 in the final.

== Seeds ==
1. (New Zealand) Marcus Daniell / (Austria) Philipp Oswald (first round)
2. (Brazil) Marcelo Demoliner / (Netherlands) Matwé Middelkoop (first round)
3. (Israel) Jonathan Erlich / (Mexico) Santiago González (first round)
4. (Italy) Simone Bolelli / (Argentina) Máximo González (semifinals)

== Draw ==
Key

- Q = Qualifier
- WC = Wild card
- LL = Lucky loser
- Alt = Alternate
- ITF = ITF entry
- PR = Protected ranking
- SR = Special ranking
- SE = Special exempt
- JE = Junior exempt
- JR = Junior Accelerator Programme entrant
- CO = College Accelerator Programme entrant
- NG = Next Gen Accelerator Program entrant
- w/o = Walkover
- r = Retired
- d = Defaulted

First round
1	(New Zealand) M Daniell (Austria) P Oswald	2	6	[4]
(Uruguay) A Behar (Ecuador) G Escobar	6	4	[10]
WC	(Italy) Alessio De Bernardis (Italy) F Passaro	4	2
WC	(India) P Gunneswaran (Poland) K Majchrzak	6	6
4	(Italy) S Bolelli (Argentina) M González	6	7^{9}
(Japan) B McLachlan (Ukraine) D Molchanov	4	6^{7}
(Kazakhstan) A Golubev (Kazakhstan) A Nedovyesov	6	6
(India) D Sharan (United States) J Withrow	2	1
(El Salvador) M Arévalo (Bosnia and Herzegovina) T Brkić	7^{7}	6
(New Zealand) A Sitak (Slovakia) I Zelenay	6^{5}	4
(Netherlands) S Arends (Netherlands) D Pel	6	6
3	(Israel) J Erlich (Mexico) S González	4	4
WC	(Italy) F Gaio (Italy) P Lorenzi	6	6
(Brazil) F Romboli (Spain) D Vega Hernández	2	2
(Argentina) A Molteni (Monaco) H Nys	6^{4}	6	[10]
2	(Brazil) M Demoliner (Netherlands) M Middelkoop	7^{7}	4	[4]

Quarterfinals
(Uruguay) A Behar (Ecuador) G Escobar	6	6
WC	(India) P Gunneswaran (Poland) K Majchrzak	4	1
4	(Italy) S Bolelli (Argentina) M González	6	6^{2}	[10]
(Kazakhstan) A Golubev (Kazakhstan) A Nedovyesov	3	7^{7}	[6]
(El Salvador) M Arévalo (Bosnia and Herzegovina) T Brkić	6	6
(Netherlands) S Arends (Netherlands) D Pel	4	2
WC	(Italy) F Gaio (Italy) P Lorenzi	4	4
(Argentina) A Molteni (Monaco) H Nys	6	6

Semifinals
(Uruguay) A Behar (Ecuador) G Escobar	6	3	[13]
4	(Italy) S Bolelli (Argentina) M González	4	6	[11]
(El Salvador) M Arévalo (Bosnia and Herzegovina) T Brkić	5	6	[11]
(Argentina) A Molteni (Monaco) H Nys	7	4	[9]

Final
(Uruguay) A Behar (Ecuador) G Escobar	4	4
(El Salvador) M Arévalo (Bosnia and Herzegovina) T Brkić	6	6
