= 2021 Emilia-Romagna Open – Men's singles =

Men's singles
- 2021 Emilia-Romagna Open

Final
- Champion: (United States) Sebastian Korda
- Runner-up: (Italy) Marco Cecchinato
- Score: 6–2, 6–4

Details
- Draw: 28 (4 Q / 3 WC )
- Seeds: 8

Events
Singles	men	women
Doubles	men	women
← 2020 ·	Emilia-Romagna Open	· 2022 →

This was the third edition of the tournament, primarily created due to the one-week delay of the 2021 French Open.

Sebastian Korda won his first ATP Tour singles title, defeating Marco Cecchinato in the final, 6–2, 6–4 without dropping a set. By winning the tournament, Korda became the first American male tennis player to win on European clay since Sam Querrey in 2010.

== Seeds ==
The top four seeds receive a bye into the second round.

1. (Italy) Lorenzo Sonego (second round)
2. (France) Benoît Paire (second round, retired)
3. (Spain) Albert Ramos Viñolas (second round)
4. (Germany) Jan-Lennard Struff (quarterfinals)
5. (France) Richard Gasquet (quarterfinals)
6. (United States) Tommy Paul (semifinals)
7. (Slovenia) Aljaž Bedene (second round)
8. (Japan) Yoshihito Nishioka (quarterfinals)

== Draw ==
=== Key ===
- Q = Qualifier
- WC = Wild card
- LL = Lucky loser
- Alt = Alternate
- SE = Special exempt
- PR = Protected ranking
- ITF = ITF entry
- JE = Junior exempt
- w/o = Walkover
- r = Retired
- d = Defaulted
- SR = Special ranking

=== Finals ===
Semifinals
(United States) Sebastian Korda	6	6
6	(United States) Tommy Paul	3	3
WC	(Italy) Marco Cecchinato	7^{7}	1	6
(Spain) Jaume Munar	6^{2}	6	1

Final
(United States) Sebastian Korda	6	6
WC	(Italy) Marco Cecchinato	2	4

=== Top half ===
First round
WC	(Italy) A Seppi	3	4
(United States) S Korda	6	6
(Italy) G Mager	6	1	2
(Italy) L Musetti	4	6	6
(United States) S Querrey	6	3	6^{3}
8	(Japan) Y Nishioka	3	6	7^{7}
WC	(Italy) F Cobolli	3	7^{8}	7^{7}
(United States) M Giron	6	6^{6}	6^{4}
(United States) S Johnson	6^{7}	2
(Czech Republic) J Veselý	7^{9}	6
(Italy) S Travaglia	5	4
6	(United States) T Paul	7	6

Second round
1	(Italy) L Sonego	1	5
(United States) S Korda	6	7
(Italy) L Musetti	3	2
8	(Japan) Y Nishioka	6	6
4	(Germany) J-L Struff	6	4	7^{7}
WC	(Italy) F Cobolli	4	6	6^{2}
(Czech Republic) J Veselý	7^{7}	6^{5}	3
6	(United States) T Paul	6^{3}	7^{7}	6

Quarterfinals
(United States) S Korda	6	6
8	(Japan) Y Nishioka	3	3
4	(Germany) J-L Struff	2	4
6	(United States) T Paul	6	6

Semifinals
(United States) S Korda	6	6
6	(United States) T Paul	3	3

=== Bottom half ===
First round
7	(Slovenia) A Bedene	6	7^{10}
(Italy) S Caruso	4	6^{8}
WC	(Italy) M Cecchinato	6	7^{7}
Q	(Italy) R Brancaccio	3	6^{5}
(Finland) E Ruusuvuori	6^{4}	7	3
LL	(Slovakia) N Gombos	7^{7}	5	6
5	(France) R Gasquet	6	6
Q	(Germany) D Altmaier	3	3
(France) G Simon	0	4
Q	(Spain) P Martínez	6	6
(Spain) J Munar	6	7^{7}
Q	(Sweden) M Ymer	3	6^{5}

Second round
7	(Slovenia) A Bedene	5	2
WC	(Italy) M Cecchinato	7	6
LL	(Slovakia) N Gombos	6	6^{4}	6
3	(Spain) A Ramos Viñolas	3	7^{7}	2
5	(France) R Gasquet	6	3	6
Q	(Spain) P Martínez	3	6	3
(Spain) J Munar	7	3
2	(France) B Paire	5	1^{r}

Quarterfinals
WC	(Italy) M Cecchinato	6	6
LL	(Slovakia) N Gombos	3	1
5	(France) R Gasquet	1	1
(Spain) J Munar	6	6

Semifinals
WC	(Italy) M Cecchinato	7^{7}	1	6
(Spain) J Munar	6^{2}	6	1

== Qualifying ==
=== Seeds ===
1. (Slovakia) Norbert Gombos (qualifying competition, lucky loser)
2. (Australia) James Duckworth (first round)
3. (Spain) Pedro Martínez (qualified)
4. (Sweden) Mikael Ymer (qualified)
5. (France) Benjamin Bonzi (qualifying competition)
6. (Germany) Philipp Kohlschreiber (first round)
7. (Germany) Daniel Altmaier (qualified)
8. (Italy) Matteo Viola (qualifying competition)

=== Qualifiers ===
1. (Germany) Daniel Altmaier
2. (Italy) Raúl Brancaccio
3. (Spain) Pedro Martínez
4. (Sweden) Mikael Ymer

=== Lucky loser ===
1. (Slovakia) Norbert Gombos

=== Qualifying draw ===
==== First qualifier ====
First round
1	(Slovakia) Norbert Gombos	4
(Australia) Max Purcell	1^{r}
(Russia) Pavel Kotov	3	1
7	(Germany) Daniel Altmaier	6	6

Qualifying competition
1	(Slovakia) Norbert Gombos	6^{6}	6^{8}
7	(Germany) Daniel Altmaier	7^{8}	7^{10}

==== Second qualifier ====
First round
2	(Australia) James Duckworth	5	3
WC	(Italy) Raúl Brancaccio	7	6
(Russia) Teymuraz Gabashvili	1	7	6
6	(Germany) Philipp Kohlschreiber	6	5	2

Qualifying competition
WC	(Italy) Raúl Brancaccio	6	6
(Russia) Teymuraz Gabashvili	3	3

==== Third qualifier ====
First round
3	(Spain) Pedro Martínez	6	6
WC	(Italy) Francesco Passaro	4	1
(United States) Ulises Blanch	3	5
5	(France) Benjamin Bonzi	6	7

Qualifying competition
3	(Spain) Pedro Martínez	6	5	7^{7}
5	(France) Benjamin Bonzi	4	7	6^{4}

==== Fourth qualifier ====
First round
4	(Sweden) Mikael Ymer	6	6
(Argentina) Facundo Mena	1	4
(Russia) Evgeny Karlovskiy	5	7	5
8	(Italy) Matteo Viola	7	5	7

Qualifying competition
4	(Sweden) Mikael Ymer	6	3	6
8	(Italy) Matteo Viola	4	6	0
