= 2021 Emilia-Romagna Open – Women's singles =

Women's singles
- 2021 Emilia-Romagna Open

Final
- Champion: (United States) Coco Gauff
- Runner-up: (China) Wang Qiang
- Score: 6–1, 6–3

Details
- Draw: 32 (6 Q / 4 WC )
- Seeds: 8

Events
Singles	men	women
Doubles	men	women
Emilia-Romagna Open	· 2022 →

This was the first edition of the tournament.

Coco Gauff won the title, defeating Wang Qiang in the final, 6–1, 6–3.

== Seeds ==
1. (United States) Serena Williams (second round)
2. (Croatia) Petra Martić (quarterfinals)
3. (United States) Coco Gauff (champion)
4. (Russia) Daria Kasatkina (second round)
5. (United States) Amanda Anisimova (quarterfinals)
6. (China) Wang Qiang (final)
7. (Spain) Sara Sorribes Tormo (second round, retired)
8. (France) Caroline Garcia (quarterfinals)

== Draw ==
=== Key ===
- Q = Qualifier
- WC = Wild card
- LL = Lucky loser
- Alt = Alternate
- ITF = ITF entry
- PR = Protected ranking
- SR = Special ranking
- SE = Special exempt
- JE = Junior exempt
- JR = Junior Accelerator Programme entrant
- CO = College Accelerator Programme entrant
- NG = Next Gen Accelerator Program entrant
- w/o = Walkover
- r = Retired
- d = Defaulted

=== Finals ===
Semifinals
(Czech Republic) Kateřina Siniaková	5	6	2
3	(United States) Coco Gauff	7	1	6
(United States) Sloane Stephens	2	6^{3}
6	(China) Wang Qiang	6	7^{7}

Final
3	(United States) Coco Gauff	6	6
6	(China) Wang Qiang	1	3

=== Top half ===
First round
1/WC	(United States) S Williams	6	6
Q	(Italy) L Pigato	3	2
(Czech Republic) K Siniaková	6	6
(Denmark) C Tauson	1	3
Q	(Germany) A-L Friedsam	6	6^{1}	6
(Switzerland) V Golubic	4	7^{7}	2
Q	(Argentina) P Ormaechea	4	4
8	(France) C Garcia	6	6
3	(United States) C Gauff	7^{8}	7^{9}
(Estonia) K Kanepi	6^{6}	6^{7}
(Italy) C Giorgi	6^{4}	6	6
(United States) C McHale	7^{7}	4	4
Q	(Slovakia) AK Schmiedlová	5	6	6
WC	(United States) V Williams	7	2	2
(Italy) J Paolini	2	1
5	(United States) A Anisimova	6	6

Second round
1/WC	(United States) S Williams	6^{4}	2
(Czech Republic) K Siniaková	7^{7}	6
Q	(Germany) A-L Friedsam	2	4
8	(France) C Garcia	6	6
3	(United States) C Gauff	6	6
(Italy) C Giorgi	2	3
Q	(Slovakia) AK Schmiedlová	2	4
5	(United States) A Anisimova	6	6

Quarterfinals
(Czech Republic) K Siniaková	7	6
8	(France) C Garcia	5	1
3	(United States) C Gauff	6	6
5	(United States) A Anisimova	3	3

Semifinals
(Czech Republic) K Siniaková	5	6	2
3	(United States) C Gauff	7	1	6

=== Bottom half ===
First round
7	(Spain) S Sorribes Tormo	6	6
(United States) B Pera	4	2
(Romania) A Bogdan	5	6	1
WC	(Italy) S Errani	7	4	6
Q	(United States) C McNally	6^{4}	4
(United States) S Stephens	7^{7}	6
(Chinese Taipei) S-w Hsieh	4	3
4	(Russia) D Kasatkina	6	6
6	(China) Q Wang	6	5	6
(Japan) M Doi	2	7	1
Q	(Italy) M Di Giuseppe	7	7^{7}
(Japan) N Hibino	5	6^{5}
WC	(Italy) G Gatto-Monticone	2	2
LL	(Russia) L Samsonova	6	6
(Russia) V Gracheva	4	2
2	(Croatia) P Martić	6	6

Second round
7	(Spain) S Sorribes Tormo	6	5	2^{r}
WC	(Italy) S Errani	4	7	2
(United States) S Stephens	1	6	7
4	(Russia) D Kasatkina	6	4	5
6	(China) Q Wang	6	6
Q	(Italy) M Di Giuseppe	4	4
LL	(Russia) L Samsonova	6^{5}	3
2	(Croatia) P Martić	7^{7}	6

Quarterfinals
WC	(Italy) S Errani	3	0
(United States) S Stephens	6	6
6	(China) Q Wang	7^{7}	3	7
2	(Croatia) P Martić	6^{4}	6	5

Semifinals
(United States) S Stephens	2	6^{3}
6	(China) Q Wang	6	7^{7}

== Qualifying ==
=== Seeds ===
1. (Romania) Ana Bogdan (moved to main draw)
2. (Russia) Liudmila Samsonova (qualifying competition, lucky loser)
3. (United States) Caty McNally (qualified)
4. (Germany) Anna-Lena Friedsam (qualified)
5. (China) Wang Yafan (first round)
6. (Slovakia) Anna Karolína Schmiedlová (qualified)
7. (Ukraine) Katarina Zavatska (qualifying competition)
8. (Switzerland) Stefanie Vögele (qualifying competition)
9. (Poland) Katarzyna Kawa (first round)
10. (Switzerland) Leonie Küng (first round)
11. (Italy) Giulia Gatto-Monticone (Received main draw wildcard)
12. (Netherlands) Lesley Pattinama Kerkhove (qualifying competition)

=== Qualifiers ===
1. (Argentina) Paula Ormaechea
2. (Italy) Lisa Pigato
3. (United States) Caty McNally
4. (Germany) Anna-Lena Friedsam
5. (Italy) Martina Di Giuseppe
6. (Slovakia) Anna Karolína Schmiedlová

=== Lucky loser ===
1. (Russia) Liudmila Samsonova

=== Qualifying draw ===
==== First qualifier ====
First round
Alt	(Argentina) Paula Ormaechea	6^{1}	7	6
(Russia) Varvara Flink	7^{7}	5	4
WC	(Italy) Stefania Rubini	4	6	4
8	(Switzerland) Stefanie Vögele	6	0	6

Qualifying competition
Alt	(Argentina) Paula Ormaechea	6	2	7
8	(Switzerland) Stefanie Vögele	2	6	5

==== Second qualifier ====
First round
2	(Russia) Liudmila Samsonova	6	6
(Australia) Ellen Perez	2	2
WC	(Italy) Lisa Pigato	1	7	6
10	(Switzerland) Leonie Küng	6	5	0

Qualifying competition
2	(Russia) Liudmila Samsonova	6	6^{2}	3
WC	(Italy) Lisa Pigato	2	7^{7}	6

==== Third qualifier ====
First round
3	(United States) Caty McNally	6	7^{7}
(Italy) Jessica Pieri	2	6^{0}
WC	(Italy) Nuria Brancaccio	6^{6}	6^{6}
7	(Ukraine) Katarina Zavatska	7^{8}	7^{8}

Qualifying competition
3	(United States) Caty McNally	6	6
7	(Ukraine) Katarina Zavatska	3	4

==== Fourth qualifier ====
First round
4	(Germany) Anna-Lena Friedsam	6	6
(United States) Asia Muhammad	2	0
(Austria) Julia Grabher	5	3
12	(Netherlands) Lesley Pattinama Kerkhove	7	6

Qualifying competition
4	(Germany) Anna-Lena Friedsam	3	7	6
12	(Netherlands) Lesley Pattinama Kerkhove	6	5	2

==== Fifth qualifier ====
First round
5	(China) Wang Yafan	6	3	3
WC	(Italy) Lucia Bronzetti	3	6	6
(Italy) Martina Di Giuseppe	4	6	6
9	(Poland) Katarzyna Kawa	6	4	4

Qualifying competition
WC	(Italy) Lucia Bronzetti	5	3
(Italy) Martina Di Giuseppe	7	6

==== Sixth qualifier ====
First round
6	(Slovakia) Anna Karolína Schmiedlová	6	6
(Italy) Bianca Turati	2	2
(Canada) Rebecca Marino	6	6
Alt	(Kazakhstan) Anna Danilina	3	1

Qualifying competition
6	(Slovakia) Anna Karolína Schmiedlová	6	6
(Canada) Rebecca Marino	1	4
