= 2021 Emilia-Romagna Open – Women's doubles =

Women's doubles
- 2021 Emilia-Romagna Open

Final
- Champions: (United States) Coco Gauff (United States) Caty McNally
- Runners-up: (Croatia) Darija Jurak (Slovenia) Andreja Klepač
- Score: 6–3, 6–2

Events
Singles	men	women
Doubles	men	women
Emilia-Romagna Open	· 2022 →

This was the first edition of the tournament.

Coco Gauff and Caty McNally won the title, defeating Darija Jurak and Andreja Klepač in the final, 6–3, 6–2. At 17 years old, Gauff became the youngest player since Maria Sharapova in 2004 to win the singles and doubles titles at the same event.

== Seeds ==
1. (Chile) Alexa Guarachi / (United States) Desirae Krawczyk (semifinals)
2. (Croatia) Darija Jurak / (Slovenia) Andreja Klepač (final)
3. (Japan) Misaki Doi / (Chinese Taipei) Hsieh Su-wei (semifinals)
4. (United States) Coco Gauff / (United States) Caty McNally (champions)

== Draw ==
=== Key ===
- Q = Qualifier
- WC = Wild card
- LL = Lucky loser
- Alt = Alternate
- ITF = ITF entry
- PR = Protected ranking
- SR = Special ranking
- SE = Special exempt
- JE = Junior exempt
- JR = Junior Accelerator Programme entrant
- CO = College Accelerator Programme entrant
- NG = Next Gen Accelerator Program entrant
- w/o = Walkover
- r = Retired
- d = Defaulted

=== Draw ===
First round
1	(Chile) A Guarachi (United States) D Krawczyk	6	6
(Georgia (country)) E Gorgodze (Georgia (country)) O Kalashnikova	3	4
(United Kingdom) N Broady (United States) A Muhammad	4	5
PR	(Switzerland) V Golubic (Russia) A Panova	6	7
4	(United States) C Gauff (United States) C McNally	6	6
(Germany) V Heisen (China) Y Wang	2	0
(Japan) M Ninomiya (China) Z Yang	6	6
WC	(Italy) J Pieri (Italy) B Turati	0	2
(United States) Q Gleason (New Zealand) E Routliffe	2	6	[8]
(France) E Lechemia (United States) I Neel	6	3	[10]
WC	(Italy) N Brancaccio (Italy) L Pigato	4	0
3	(Japan) M Doi (Chinese Taipei) S-w Hsieh	6	6
(United Kingdom) E Silva (Belgium) K Zimmermann	6	7
(United States) K Christian (United States) S Santamaria	4	5
(France) C Garcia (Australia) E Perez	2	6^{5}
2	(Croatia) D Jurak (Slovenia) A Klepač	6	7^{7}

Quarterfinals
1	(Chile) A Guarachi (United States) D Krawczyk	6	6
PR	(Switzerland) V Golubic (Russia) A Panova	1	2
4	(United States) C Gauff (United States) C McNally	6	6
(Japan) M Ninomiya (China) Z Yang	0	1
(France) E Lechemia (United States) I Neel	3	5
3	(Japan) M Doi (Chinese Taipei) S-w Hsieh	6	7
(United Kingdom) E Silva (Belgium) K Zimmermann	1	5
2	(Croatia) D Jurak (Slovenia) A Klepač	6	7

Semifinals
1	(Chile) A Guarachi (United States) D Krawczyk	5	6^{4}
4	(United States) C Gauff (United States) C McNally	7	7^{7}
3	(Japan) M Doi (Chinese Taipei) S-w Hsieh	6	6^{4}	[8]
2	(Croatia) D Jurak (Slovenia) A Klepač	3	7^{7}	[10]

Final
4	(United States) C Gauff (United States) C McNally	6	6
2	(Croatia) D Jurak (Slovenia) A Klepač	3	2
