= 2022 French Open – Men's singles =

Tennis championship

Men's singles
- 2022 French Open

Final
- Champion: (Spain) Rafael Nadal
- Runner-up: (Norway) Casper Ruud
- Score: 6–3, 6–3, 6–0

Details
- Draw: 128
- Seeds: 32

Events
Singles	men	women		boys	girls
Doubles	men	women	mixed	boys	girls
WC Singles	men	women	quad
WC Doubles	men	women	quad
Legends	men	women

Qualification
Singles	men	women
- French Open

Rafael Nadal defeated Casper Ruud in the final, 6–3, 6–3, 6–0 to win the men's singles tennis title at the 2022 French Open. It was his record-extending 14th French Open title and record-extending 22nd and last major title overall. It was also his 92nd and final ATP Tour-level singles title. Nadal was the third man to defeat four top-10 players en route to a major title since the introduction of ATP rankings in 1973 (after Mats Wilander at the 1982 French Open and Roger Federer at the 2017 Australian Open). Ruud was the first Norwegian man to reach a major quarterfinal and beyond (surpassing his father Christian), and the first Scandinavian man to do so since Robin Söderling in 2010.

Novak Djokovic was the defending champion, but lost in the quarterfinals to Nadal. Their quarterfinal match was their record-extending 59th encounter, and their tenth encounter at the French Open, an Open Era record for two players in one tournament.

Djokovic, Daniil Medvedev and Alexander Zverev were in contention for the world No. 1 singles ranking. Following Djokovic's quarterfinal loss and Zverev's semifinal retirement, Djokovic retained the top position at the end of the tournament. One week later, when points from the previous year's tournament were dropped, Medvedev reclaimed the top ranking, while Zverev reached world No. 2, ending the Big Three's streak in the top two spots since 10 November 2003. Additionally, as Federer did not enter the tournament, he fell out of the top 50 in the ATP rankings for the first time since 5 June 2000.

Stefanos Tsitsipas' fourth-round loss guaranteed a first-time French Open finalist from the bottom half of the draw, with Ruud emerging as that finalist. Holger Rune was the first Danish man to reach a major singles quarterfinal in the Open Era. This tournament marked the first time since the 2002 Australian Open that Feliciano López failed to qualify for the main draw of a major, ending his record streak of 79 consecutive major appearances. This marked the final professional appearance of former world No. 5 and 2008 Australian Open runner-up Jo-Wilfried Tsonga, who lost in the first round to Ruud.

This was the first edition of the French Open to feature a tiebreak (10-point) in the fifth set when the match reached 6 games all. Camilo Ugo Carabelli and Aslan Karatsev became the first players to contest this tiebreak in the main draw in their first-round match, with Ugo Carabelli emerging victorious.

== Seeds ==
1. (Serbia) Novak Djokovic (quarterfinals)
2. (Note: On 1 March 2022, the ATP announced that players from Russia and Belarus will not be allowed to compete under the name or flag of Russia or Belarus following the 2022 Russian invasion of Ukraine.)Daniil Medvedev (fourth round)
3. (Germany) Alexander Zverev (semifinals, retired)
4. (Greece) Stefanos Tsitsipas (fourth round)
5. (Spain) Rafael Nadal (champion)
6. (Spain) Carlos Alcaraz (quarterfinals)
7. Andrey Rublev (quarterfinals)
8. (Norway) Casper Ruud (final)
9. (Canada) Félix Auger-Aliassime (fourth round)
10. (United Kingdom) Cameron Norrie (third round)
11. (Italy) Jannik Sinner (fourth round, retired)
12. (Poland) Hubert Hurkacz (fourth round)
13. (United States) Taylor Fritz (second round)
14. (Canada) Denis Shapovalov (first round)
15. (Argentina) Diego Schwartzman (fourth round)
16. (Spain) Pablo Carreño Busta (first round)

17. (United States) Reilly Opelka (first round)
18. (Bulgaria) Grigor Dimitrov (third round)
19. (Australia) Alex de Minaur (first round)
20. (Croatia) Marin Čilić (semifinals)
21. Karen Khachanov (fourth round)
22. (Georgia (country)) Nikoloz Basilashvili (second round)
23. (United States) John Isner (third round)
24. (United States) Frances Tiafoe (second round)
25. (Spain) Alejandro Davidovich Fokina (first round)
26. (Netherlands) Botic van de Zandschulp (third round)
27. (United States) Sebastian Korda (third round)
28. (Serbia) Miomir Kecmanović (third round)
29. (United Kingdom) Dan Evans (second round)
30. (United States) Tommy Paul (first round)
31. (United States) Jenson Brooksby (first round)
32. (Italy) Lorenzo Sonego (third round)

Click on the seed number of a player to go to their draw section.

== Draw ==
Key

- Q = Qualifier
- WC = Wild card
- LL = Lucky loser
- Alt = Alternate
- ITF = ITF entry
- PR = Protected ranking
- SR = Special ranking
- SE = Special exempt
- JE = Junior exempt
- JR = Junior Accelerator Programme entrant
- CO = College Accelerator Programme entrant
- NG = Next Gen Accelerator Program entrant
- w/o = Walkover
- r = Retired
- d = Defaulted

=== Finals ===
Quarterfinals
1	(Serbia) Novak Djokovic	2	6	2	6^{4}
5	(Spain) Rafael Nadal	6	4	6	7^{7}
3	(Germany) Alexander Zverev	6	6	4	7^{9}
6	(Spain) Carlos Alcaraz	4	4	6	6^{7}
8	(Norway) Casper Ruud	6	4	7^{7}	6
(Denmark) Holger Rune	1	6	6^{2}	3
7	Andrey Rublev	7	3	4	6	6^{2}
20	(Croatia) Marin Čilić	5	6	6	3	7^{10}

Semifinals
5	(Spain) Rafael Nadal	7^{10}	6
3	(Germany) Alexander Zverev	6^{8}	6^{r}
8	(Norway) Casper Ruud	3	6	6	6
20	(Croatia) Marin Čilić	6	4	2	2

Final
5	(Spain) Rafael Nadal	6	6	6
8	(Norway) Casper Ruud	3	3	0

=== Top half ===
==== Section 1 ====
First round
1	(Serbia) N Djokovic	6	6	6
(Japan) Y Nishioka	3	1	0
(Slovakia) A Molčan	6	6	3	6
(Argentina) F Coria	3	4	6	3
PR	(Slovenia) A Bedene	6	6	6^{5}	6
WC	(Australia) C O’Connell	2	4	7^{7}	1
(Uruguay) P Cuevas	6	6	6
31	(United States) J Brooksby	2	1	2
18	(Bulgaria) G Dimitrov	6	6	6
(United States) M Giron	1	1	1
PR	(Croatia) B Ćorić	3	6	6	6
(Spain) C Taberner	6	2	3	1
(Germany) D Altmaier	1	3	6	3
(Spain) J Munar	6	6	4	6
Q	A Kuznetsov	3	6	4	2
15	(Argentina) D Schwartzman	6	1	6	6

Second round
1	(Serbia) N Djokovic	6	6	7^{7}
(Slovakia) A Molčan	2	3	6^{4}
PR	(Slovenia) A Bedene	4	6	7^{7}	6
(Uruguay) P Cuevas	6	4	6^{5}	4
18	(Bulgaria) G Dimitrov	6	6	6
PR	(Croatia) B Ćorić	0	4	3
(Spain) J Munar	6	7^{7}	2	2	2
15	(Argentina) D Schwartzman	2	6^{3}	6	6	6

Third round
1	(Serbia) N Djokovic	6	6	6
PR	(Slovenia) A Bedene	3	3	2
18	(Bulgaria) G Dimitrov	3	1	2
15	(Argentina) D Schwartzman	6	6	6

Fourth round
1	(Serbia) N Djokovic	6	6	6
15	(Argentina) D Schwartzman	1	3	3

==== Section 2 ====
First round
9	(Canada) F Auger-Aliassime	2	2	6	6	6
Q	(Peru) JP Varillas	6	6	1	3	3
Q	(Argentina) C Ugo Carabelli	6	4	6	3	7^{10}
A Karatsev	3	6	4	6	6^{5}
LL	(Italy) A Giannessi	4	7^{7}	7^{7}	6^{4}	4
Q	(Croatia) B Gojo	6	6^{3}	6^{4}	7^{7}	6
(Serbia) F Krajinović	7^{7}	6	6
17	(United States) R Opelka	6^{5}	2	3
26	(Netherlands) B van de Zandschulp	6	3	6	6
Q	P Kotov	3	6	3	2
(Italy) F Fognini	6	7	6
(Australia) A Popyrin	4	5	4
PR	(Switzerland) S Wawrinka	6	3	6^{2}	3
WC	(France) C Moutet	2	6	7^{7}	6
(Australia) J Thompson	2	2	2
5	(Spain) R Nadal	6	6	6

Second round
9	(Canada) F Auger-Aliassime	6	6	6
Q	(Argentina) C Ugo Carabelli	0	3	4
Q	(Croatia) B Gojo	6^{5}	2	7	1
(Serbia) F Krajinović	7^{7}	6	5	6
26	(Netherlands) B van de Zandschulp	6	7^{7}	3
(Italy) F Fognini	4	6^{2}	2^{r}
WC	(France) C Moutet	3	1	4
5	(Spain) R Nadal	6	6	6

Third round
9	(Canada) F Auger-Aliassime	7^{7}	7^{7}	7
(Serbia) F Krajinović	6^{3}	6^{2}	5
26	(Netherlands) B van de Zandschulp	3	2	4
5	(Spain) R Nadal	6	6	6

Fourth round
9	(Canada) F Auger-Aliassime	6	3	2	6	3
5	(Spain) R Nadal	3	6	6	3	6

==== Section 3 ====
First round
3	(Germany) A Zverev	6	6	6
Q	(Austria) S Ofner	2	4	4
(Serbia) D Lajović	3	6	4	3
(Argentina) S Báez	6	3	6	6
(United States) B Nakashima	6	2	4	7^{7}	6
(Poland) K Majchrzak	4	6	6	6^{3}	2
(Netherlands) T Griekspoor	2	6	6	6
25	(Spain) A Davidovich Fokina	6	0	4	3
23	(United States) J Isner	7^{7}	4	7^{7}	7^{8}
(France) Q Halys	6^{3}	6	6^{1}	6^{6}
(Japan) T Daniel	6	2	6	3	4
WC	(France) G Barrère	3	6	0	6	6
WC	(United States) M Mmoh	6^{7}	3	5
Q	(Spain) B Zapata Miralles	7^{9}	6	7
Q	(Argentina) S Rodríguez Taverna	6^{2}	6	3	6	4
13	(United States) T Fritz	7^{7}	3	6	4	6

Second round
3	(Germany) A Zverev	2	4	6	6	7
(Argentina) S Báez	6	6	1	2	5
(United States) B Nakashima	7^{8}	6	6
(Netherlands) T Griekspoor	6^{6}	4	2
23	(United States) J Isner	6	6	3	7^{7}
WC	(France) G Barrère	4	4	6	6^{5}
Q	(Spain) B Zapata Miralles	3	6	6	6
13	(United States) T Fritz	6	2	2	3

Third round
3	(Germany) A Zverev	7^{7}	6	7^{7}
(United States) B Nakashima	6^{2}	3	6^{5}
23	(United States) J Isner	4	6	4	7^{7}	3
Q	(Spain) B Zapata Miralles	6	3	6	6^{5}	6

Fourth round
3	(Germany) A Zverev	7^{13}	7	6
Q	(Spain) B Zapata Miralles	6^{11}	5	3

==== Section 4 ====
First round
10	(United Kingdom) C Norrie	7	6	6
WC	(France) M Guinard	5	2	0
Q	(Australia) J Kubler	7^{7}	7^{7}	7^{7}
(United States) D Kudla	6^{5}	6^{2}	6^{3}
(Bolivia) H Dellien	6	6	6
(Austria) D Thiem	3	2	4
Q	(Portugal) N Borges	3	6	4	4
21	K Khachanov	6	2	6	6
27	(United States) S Korda	6	7	7^{8}
(Australia) J Millman	1	5	6^{6}
(South Africa) L Harris	1	3	4
(France) R Gasquet	6	6	6
(Spain) A Ramos Viñolas	6	4	6	7^{7}
(Australia) T Kokkinakis	4	6	4	6^{5}
LL	(Argentina) JI Londero	4	2	0
6	(Spain) C Alcaraz	6	6	6

Second round
10	(United Kingdom) C Norrie	6	6	6
Q	(Australia) J Kubler	3	4	3
(Bolivia) H Dellien	6	4	6^{1}	3
21	K Khachanov	4	6	7^{7}	6
27	(United States) S Korda	7^{7}	6	6
(France) R Gasquet	6^{5}	3	3
(Spain) A Ramos Viñolas	1	7^{9}	7	6^{2}	4
6	(Spain) C Alcaraz	6	6^{7}	5	7^{7}	6

Third round
10	(United Kingdom) C Norrie	2	5	7	4
21	K Khachanov	6	7	5	6
27	(United States) S Korda	4	4	2
6	(Spain) C Alcaraz	6	6	6

Fourth round
21	K Khachanov	1	4	4
6	(Spain) C Alcaraz	6	6	6

=== Bottom half ===
==== Section 5 ====
First round
8	(Norway) C Ruud	6^{6}	7^{7}	6	7^{7}
WC	(France) J-W Tsonga	7^{8}	6^{4}	2	6^{0}
(Finland) E Ruusuvuori	6	2	6^{4}	6	6
(France) U Humbert	2	6	7^{7}	4	2
(Portugal) J Sousa	6^{5}	6	4	6	6
Q	(Chinese Taipei) C-h Tseng	7^{7}	1	6	1	4
(Germany) P Gojowczyk	2	2	1
32	(Italy) L Sonego	6	6	6
24	(United States) F Tiafoe	7	7	7^{7}
(France) B Bonzi	5	5	6^{5}
(Czech Republic) J Lehečka	4	6	4	4
(Belgium) D Goffin	6	4	6	6
(Italy) M Cecchinato	4	4	6	7	6
(Spain) P Andújar	6	6	0	5	0
Q	(Italy) G Zeppieri	5	2	5
12	(Poland) H Hurkacz	7	6	7

Second round
8	(Norway) C Ruud	6	6	6
(Finland) E Ruusuvuori	3	4	2
(Portugal) J Sousa	6^{4}	3	4
32	(Italy) L Sonego	7^{7}	6	6
24	(United States) F Tiafoe	6	6^{1}	2	4
(Belgium) D Goffin	3	7^{7}	6	6
(Italy) M Cecchinato	1	4	2
12	(Poland) H Hurkacz	6	6	6

Third round
8	(Norway) C Ruud	6	6^{3}	1	6	6
32	(Italy) L Sonego	2	7^{7}	6	4	3
(Belgium) D Goffin	5	2	1
12	(Poland) H Hurkacz	7	6	6

Fourth round
8	(Norway) C Ruud	6	6	3	6
12	(Poland) H Hurkacz	2	3	6	3

==== Section 6 ====
First round
14	(Canada) D Shapovalov	3	1	6^{4}
(Denmark) H Rune	6	6	7^{7}
(Spain) P Martínez	6	4	4	6^{1}
(Switzerland) H Laaksonen	2	6	6	7^{7}
Q	(Slovakia) N Gombos	1	6	2	3
LL	(Argentina) P Cachín	6	3	6	6
(France) H Gaston	4	6	6	0	7^{10}
19	(Australia) A de Minaur	6	2	3	6	6^{4}
29	(United Kingdom) D Evans	7^{7}	6	6
(Argentina) F Cerúndolo	6^{3}	4	4
(Sweden) M Ymer	6	6	6
(Australia) J Duckworth	2	4	2
WC	(France) L Pouille	3	6	5	4
Q	(Czech Republic) Z Kolář	6	4	7	6
(Italy) L Musetti	7	6	2	3	2
4	(Greece) S Tsitsipas	5	4	6	6	6

Second round
(Denmark) H Rune	6	6	6
(Switzerland) H Laaksonen	2	3	3
LL	(Argentina) P Cachín	4	2	4
(France) H Gaston	6	6	6
29	(United Kingdom) D Evans	3	6	2	3
(Sweden) M Ymer	6	3	6	6
Q	(Czech Republic) Z Kolář	3	6^{8}	7^{7}	6^{7}
4	(Greece) S Tsitsipas	6	7^{10}	6^{3}	7^{9}

Third round
(Denmark) H Rune	6	6	6
(France) H Gaston	3	3	3
(Sweden) M Ymer	2	2	1
4	(Greece) S Tsitsipas	6	6	6

Fourth round
(Denmark) H Rune	7	3	6	6
4	(Greece) S Tsitsipas	5	6	3	4

==== Section 7 ====
First round
7	A Rublev	6^{5}	6	6	6
(South Korea) S-w Kwon	7^{7}	3	2	4
(France) A Mannarino	1	6^{1}	2
(Argentina) F Delbonis	6	7^{7}	6
(France) B Paire	3	5	6	5
I Ivashka	6	7	1	7
(Chile) C Garín	5	6	6	6
30	(United States) T Paul	7	1	2	3
22	(Georgia (country)) N Basilashvili	3	2	7^{10}	6	6
(United States) M Cressy	6	6	6^{8}	4	4
(United States) M McDonald	1	6	6	7^{7}
LL	(Italy) F Agamenone	6	2	3	6^{3}
(Spain) R Carballés Baena	7^{7}	6	3	2	6
(Germany) O Otte	6^{5}	1	6	6	3
Q	(United States) B Fratangelo	3	2	3
11	(Italy) J Sinner	6	6	6

Second round
7	A Rublev	6	3	6	6
(Argentina) F Delbonis	3	6	2	3
I Ivashka	3	6^{5}	6	3
(Chile) C Garín	6	7^{7}	4	6
22	(Georgia (country)) N Basilashvili	3	1	4
(United States) M McDonald	6	6	6
(Spain) R Carballés Baena	6	4	4	3
11	(Italy) J Sinner	3	6	6	6

Third round
7	A Rublev	6	3	6	7^{13}
(Chile) C Garín	4	6	2	6^{11}
(United States) M McDonald	3	6^{6}	3
11	(Italy) J Sinner	6	7^{8}	6

Fourth round
7	A Rublev	1	6	2
11	(Italy) J Sinner	6	4	0^{r}

==== Section 8 ====
First round
16	(Spain) P Carreño Busta	4	4	6	6	4
WC	(France) G Simon	6	6	4	1	6
(Czech Republic) J Veselý	7^{7}	6^{4}	3	2
(United States) S Johnson	6^{4}	7^{7}	6	6
(Hungary) M Fucsovics	6	6	6
Q	(France) G Blancaneaux	2	4	4
PR	(Hungary) A Balázs	0	1	2
20	(Croatia) M Čilić	6	6	6
28	(Serbia) M Kecmanović	6	7	6
(Argentina) TM Etcheverry	3	5	3
(France) A Rinderknech	2	4	4
(Kazakhstan) A Bublik	6	6	6
(Lithuania) R Berankis	4	4	4
(Serbia) L Djere	6	6	6
(Argentina) F Bagnis	2	2	2
2	D Medvedev	6	6	6

Second round
WC	(France) G Simon	7	6	7^{8}
(United States) S Johnson	5	1	6^{6}
(Hungary) M Fucsovics	6	4	2	3
20	(Croatia) M Čilić	4	6	6	6
28	(Serbia) M Kecmanović	4	7	6	6
(Kazakhstan) A Bublik	6	5	2	1
(Serbia) L Djere	3	4	3
2	D Medvedev	6	6	6

Third round
WC	(France) G Simon	0	3	2
20	(Croatia) M Čilić	6	6	6
28	(Serbia) M Kecmanović	2	4	2
2	D Medvedev	6	6	6

Fourth round
20	(Croatia) M Čilić	6	6	6
2	D Medvedev	2	3	2

== Seeded players ==
The following are the seeded players. Seedings are based on ATP rankings as of 16 May 2022. Rankings and points before are as of 23 May 2022.

Because the 2022 tournament takes place one week earlier than in 2021, points from the 2020 and 2021 tournaments will not be dropped until 13 June 2022, one week after the end of the 2022 tournament. Those points are accordingly not reflected in the table below. Instead of points from the 2020 and 2021 tournaments, players will be dropping either (a) points from tournaments held during the week of 24 May 2021 (Belgrade 2 and Parma) or (b) their 19th best result.

Note that this is a different rankings adjustment system than the one that the WTA is using for the women's tournament.

Seed	Rank	Player	Points before	Points dropping (or 19th best result)^{†}	Points won	Points after	Status
1	1	(Serbia) Novak Djokovic	8,660	250	360	8,770	Quarterfinals lost to (Spain) Rafael Nadal [5]
2	2	Daniil Medvedev	7,980	(0)	180	8,160	Fourth round lost to (Croatia) Marin Čilić [20]
3	3	(Germany) Alexander Zverev	7,075	(0)	720	7,795	Semifinals retired against (Spain) Rafael Nadal [5] due to ankle injury
4	4	(Greece) Stefanos Tsitsipas	5,965	(45)	180	6,100	Fourth round lost to (Denmark) Holger Rune
5	5	(Spain) Rafael Nadal	5,525	(0)	2,000	7,525	Champion, defeated (Norway) Casper Ruud [8]
6	6	(Spain) Carlos Alcaraz	4,648	(3)	360	5,005	Quarterfinals lost to (Germany) Alexander Zverev [3]
7	7	Andrey Rublev	3,945	(45)	360	4,260	Quarterfinals lost to (Croatia) Marin Čilić [20]
8	8	(Norway) Casper Ruud	3,940	(90)	1,200	5,050	Runner-up, lost to (Spain) Rafael Nadal [5]
9	9	(Canada) Félix Auger-Aliassime	3,820	(45)	180	3,955	Fourth round lost to (Spain) Rafael Nadal [5]
10	11	(United Kingdom) Cameron Norrie	3,455	(45)	90	3,500	Third round lost to Karen Khachanov [21]
11	12	(Italy) Jannik Sinner	3,185	(10)	180	3,355	Fourth round retired against Andrey Rublev [7] due to knee injury
12	13	(Poland) Hubert Hurkacz	3,095	17	180	3,258	Fourth round lost to (Norway) Casper Ruud [8]
13	14	(United States) Taylor Fritz	2,920	(45)	45	2,920	Second round lost to (Spain) Bernabé Zapata Miralles [Q]
14	15	(Canada) Denis Shapovalov	2,531	(10)	10	2,531	First round lost to (Denmark) Holger Rune
15	16	(Argentina) Diego Schwartzman	2,505	(90)	180	2,595	Fourth round lost to (Serbia) Novak Djokovic [1]
16	18	(Spain) Pablo Carreño Busta	2,135	(10)	10	2,135	First round lost to (France) Gilles Simon [WC]
17	17	(United States) Reilly Opelka	2,180	(45)	10	2,145	First round lost to (Serbia) Filip Krajinović
18	21	(Bulgaria) Grigor Dimitrov	1,740	(0)	90	1,830	Third round lost to (Argentina) Diego Schwartzman [15]
19	20	(Australia) Alex de Minaur	1,838	(23)	10	1,825	First round lost to (France) Hugo Gaston
20	23	(Croatia) Marin Čilić	1,695	(45)	720	2,370	Semifinals lost to (Norway) Casper Ruud [8]
21	25	Karen Khachanov	1,620	(45)	180	1,755	Fourth round lost to (Spain) Carlos Alcaraz [6]
22	24	(Georgia (country)) Nikoloz Basilashvili	1,628	(10)	45	1,663	Second round lost to (United States) Mackenzie McDonald
23	26	(United States) John Isner	1,616	(10)	90	1,696	Third round lost to (Spain) Bernabé Zapata Miralles [Q]
24	27	(United States) Frances Tiafoe	1,599	(23)	45	1,621	Second round lost to (Belgium) David Goffin
25	28	(Spain) Alejandro Davidovich Fokina	1,400	(10)	10	1,400	First round lost to (Netherlands) Tallon Griekspoor
26	29	(Netherlands) Botic van de Zandschulp	1,344	(26)	90	1,408	Third round lost to (Spain) Rafael Nadal [5]
27	30	(United States) Sebastian Korda	1,326	250	90	1,166	Third round lost to (Spain) Carlos Alcaraz [6]
28	31	(Serbia) Miomir Kecmanović	1,316	(20)	90	1,386	Third round lost to Daniil Medvedev [2]
29	32	(United Kingdom) Dan Evans	1,232	63	45	1,214	Second round lost to (Sweden) Mikael Ymer
30	33	(United States) Tommy Paul	1,218	90	10	1,138	First round lost to (Chile) Cristian Garín
31	34	(United States) Jenson Brooksby	1,207	(0)	10	1,217	First round lost to (Uruguay) Pablo Cuevas
32	35	(Italy) Lorenzo Sonego	1,190	(20)	90	1,260	Third round lost to (Norway) Casper Ruud [8]

† This column shows either (a) the player's points from tournaments held during the week of 24 May 2021 (Belgrade 2 and Parma) or (b) his 19th best result (in brackets). Points from the 2020 and 2021 French Open will not be dropped until 13 June 2022, one week after the end of the 2022 tournament, and are accordingly not shown in this table.

=== Withdrawn players ===
The following players would have been seeded, but withdrew before the tournament began.

Rank	Player	Points before	Points dropping (or 19th best result)	Points after	Withdrawal reason
10	(Italy) Matteo Berrettini	3,805	(0)	3,805	Right hand injury
19	(Spain) Roberto Bautista Agut	1,903	(23)	1,880	Wrist injury
22	(France) Gaël Monfils	1,715	(0)	1,715	Right foot injury

== Other entry information ==
=== Wild cards ===
- (France) Grégoire Barrère
- (France) Manuel Guinard
- (United States) Michael Mmoh
- (France) Corentin Moutet
- (Australia) Christopher O'Connell
- (France) Lucas Pouille
- (France) Gilles Simon
- (France) Jo-Wilfried Tsonga

=== Protected ranking ===
- (Hungary) Attila Balázs (101)
- (Slovenia) Aljaž Bedene (75)
- (Croatia) Borna Ćorić (27)
- (Switzerland) Stan Wawrinka (22)

=== Qualifiers ===
- (France) Geoffrey Blancaneaux
- (Portugal) Nuno Borges
- (United States) Bjorn Fratangelo
- (Croatia) Borna Gojo
- (Slovakia) Norbert Gombos
- (Czech Republic) Zdeněk Kolář
- Pavel Kotov
- (Australia) Jason Kubler
- Andrey Kuznetsov
- (Austria) Sebastian Ofner
- (Argentina) Santiago Rodríguez Taverna
- (Chinese Taipei) Tseng Chun-hsin
- (Argentina) Camilo Ugo Carabelli
- (Peru) Juan Pablo Varillas
- (Spain) Bernabé Zapata Miralles
- (Italy) Giulio Zeppieri

=== Lucky losers ===
- (Italy) Franco Agamenone
- (Argentina) Pedro Cachín
- (Italy) Alessandro Giannessi
- (Argentina) Juan Ignacio Londero

=== Withdrawals ===
- † (Switzerland) Roger Federer (43) → replaced by (Germany) Peter Gojowczyk (101)
- † (Japan) Kei Nishikori (56) → replaced by (Hungary) Attila Balázs (101 PR)
- ‡ (Australia) Nick Kyrgios (77) → replaced by (France) Quentin Halys (102)
- ‡ (France) Jérémy Chardy (88 PR) → replaced by (Uruguay) Pablo Cuevas (103)
- ‡ (Italy) Matteo Berrettini (6) → replaced by (Spain) Jaume Munar (105)
- ‡ (Germany) Dominik Koepfer (64) → replaced by (Japan) Taro Daniel (106)
- ‡ (United Kingdom) Andy Murray (85) → replaced by (United States) Steve Johnson (107) (Note: Last direct acceptance)
- @ (France) Gaël Monfils (21) → replaced by (Argentina) Juan Ignacio Londero (LL)
- @ (Germany) Jan-Lennard Struff (60) → replaced by (Argentina) Pedro Cachín (LL)
- @ (Spain) Roberto Bautista Agut (18) → replaced by (Italy) Franco Agamenone (LL)
- § (Chile) Alejandro Tabilo (97) → replaced by (Italy) Alessandro Giannessi (LL)

Rank date: 11 April 2022

† – not included on entry list
‡ – withdrew from entry list before qualifying began
@ – withdrew from entry list after qualifying began
§ – withdrew from main draw

== Explanatory notes ==
Preceded by 2022 Australian Open – Men's singles	Grand Slam men's singles	Succeeded by 2022 Wimbledon Championships – Men's singles
