= 2022 French Open – Men's doubles =

Men's doubles
- 2022 French Open

Final
- Champions: (El Salvador) Marcelo Arévalo (Netherlands) Jean-Julien Rojer
- Runners-up: (Croatia) Ivan Dodig (United States) Austin Krajicek
- Score: 6–7^{(4–7)}, 7–6^{(7–5)}, 6–3

Events
Singles	men	women		boys	girls
Doubles	men	women	mixed	boys	girls
WC Singles	men	women	quad
WC Doubles	men	women	quad
Legends	men	women
- French Open

Marcelo Arévalo and Jean-Julien Rojer defeated Ivan Dodig and Austin Krajicek in the final, 6–7^{(4–7)}, 7–6^{(7–5)}, 6–3 to win the men's doubles tennis title at the 2022 French Open. They saved three championship points en route to winning their first major title as a team and their third overall title together. With his maiden major title, Arévalo became the first men's doubles major champion from Central America, and at 40 years of age, Rojer became the oldest men's doubles major champion in the Open Era with his third major men's doubles title.

Pierre-Hugues Herbert and Nicolas Mahut were the defending champions, but lost in the first round to Sander Gillé and Joran Vliegen.

Mate Pavić was vying to complete the career Golden Slam, but lost in the third round to Rohan Bopanna and Matwé Middelkoop.

This was the first men's doubles major tournament in the Open Era where all eight teams in the quarterfinals consisted of players from different countries.

== Seeds ==
1. (United States) Rajeev Ram / (United Kingdom) Joe Salisbury (quarterfinals)
2. (Croatia) Nikola Mektić / (Croatia) Mate Pavić (third round)
3. (France) Pierre-Hugues Herbert / (France) Nicolas Mahut (first round)
4. (Spain) Marcel Granollers / (Argentina) Horacio Zeballos (semifinals)
5. (Colombia) Juan Sebastián Cabal / (Colombia) Robert Farah (first round)
6. (Netherlands) Wesley Koolhof / (United Kingdom) Neal Skupski (quarterfinals)
7. (Germany) Tim Pütz / (New Zealand) Michael Venus (third round)
8. (Australia) John Peers / (Slovakia) Filip Polášek (first round)
9. (Germany) Kevin Krawietz / (Germany) Andreas Mies (first round)
10. (United Kingdom) Jamie Murray / (Brazil) Bruno Soares (second round)
11. (Italy) Simone Bolelli / (Italy) Fabio Fognini (withdrew)
12. (El Salvador) Marcelo Arévalo / (Netherlands) Jean-Julien Rojer (champions)
13. (Mexico) Santiago González / (Argentina) Andrés Molteni (first round)
14. (Australia) Matthew Ebden / (Australia) Max Purcell (first round)
15. (Argentina) Máximo González / (Brazil) Marcelo Melo (second round)
16. (India) Rohan Bopanna / (Netherlands) Matwé Middelkoop (semifinals)

== Draw ==
Key

- Q = Qualifier
- WC = Wild card
- LL = Lucky loser
- Alt = Alternate
- ITF = ITF entry
- PR = Protected ranking
- SR = Special ranking
- SE = Special exempt
- JE = Junior exempt
- JR = Junior Accelerator Programme entrant
- CO = College Accelerator Programme entrant
- NG = Next Gen Accelerator Program entrant
- w/o = Walkover
- r = Retired
- d = Defaulted

=== Finals ===
Quarterfinals
1	(United States) Rajeev Ram (United Kingdom) Joe Salisbury	6	6^{9}	6^{10}
(Croatia) Ivan Dodig (United States) Austin Krajicek	3	7^{11}	7^{12}
4	(Spain) Marcel Granollers (Argentina) Horacio Zeballos	3	6	6
6	(Netherlands) Wesley Koolhof (United Kingdom) Neal Skupski	6	3	4
12	(El Salvador) Marcelo Arévalo (Netherlands) Jean-Julien Rojer	7^{8}	6
(Brazil) Rafael Matos (Spain) David Vega Hernández	6^{6}	3
(United Kingdom) Lloyd Glasspool (Finland) Harri Heliövaara	6	4	6^{3}
16	(India) Rohan Bopanna (Netherlands) Matwé Middelkoop	4	6	7^{10}

Semifinals
(Croatia) Ivan Dodig (United States) Austin Krajicek	4	7^{7}	7
4	(Spain) Marcel Granollers (Argentina) Horacio Zeballos	6	6^{1}	5
12	(El Salvador) Marcelo Arévalo (Netherlands) Jean-Julien Rojer	4	6	7^{10}
16	(India) Rohan Bopanna (Netherlands) Matwé Middelkoop	6	3	6^{8}

Final
(Croatia) Ivan Dodig (United States) Austin Krajicek	7^{7}	6^{5}	3
12	(El Salvador) Marcelo Arévalo (Netherlands) Jean-Julien Rojer	6^{4}	7^{7}	6

=== Top half ===
==== Section 1 ====
First round
1	(United States) R Ram (United Kingdom) J Salisbury	6	6
(United States) M Giron (South Korea) S-w Kwon	3	2
(Serbia) M Kecmanović (United States) N Monroe	6	6
(Georgia (country)) N Basilashvili (Portugal) J Sousa	4	4
(Czech Republic) R Jebavý (Serbia) M Sabanov	6	3	4
(United States) M Cressy (Spain) F López	4	6	6
(Slovenia) A Bedene (Serbia) F Krajinović	4	2
15	(Argentina) M González (Brazil) M Melo	6	6
Alt	(Argentina) TM Etcheverry (Chile) A Tabilo
(Hungary) M Fucsovics (United States) F Tiafoe	w/o
(Kazakhstan) A Bublik (Australia) T Kokkinakis	7	7^{7}
(United States) N Lammons (Poland) K Majchrzak	5	6^{5}
WC	(France) S Doumbia (France) F Reboul	6	7^{8}
(Spain) P Andújar (Spain) P Martínez	2	6^{6}
(Croatia) I Dodig (United States) A Krajicek	6	7^{7}
8	(Australia) J Peers (Slovakia) F Polášek	4	6^{2}

Second round
1	(United States) R Ram (United Kingdom) J Salisbury	6	7^{7}
(Serbia) M Kecmanović (United States) N Monroe	3	6^{5}
(United States) M Cressy (Spain) F López	6	6
15	(Argentina) M González (Brazil) M Melo	4	4
(Hungary) M Fucsovics (United States) F Tiafoe	4	3
(Kazakhstan) A Bublik (Australia) T Kokkinakis	6	6
WC	(France) S Doumbia (France) F Reboul	6	4	6^{6}
(Croatia) I Dodig (United States) A Krajicek	4	6	7^{10}

Third round
1	(United States) R Ram (United Kingdom) J Salisbury	7	6
(United States) M Cressy (Spain) F López	5	4
(Kazakhstan) A Bublik (Australia) T Kokkinakis	3	2
(Croatia) I Dodig (United States) A Krajicek	6	6

Quarterfinals
1	(United States) R Ram (United Kingdom) J Salisbury	6	6^{9}	6^{10}
(Croatia) I Dodig (United States) A Krajicek	3	7^{11}	7^{12}

==== Section 2 ====
First round
4	(Spain) M Granollers (Argentina) H Zeballos	7	6
WC	(France) U Humbert (France) C Lestienne	5	2
(France) A Mannarino (France) A Olivetti	7^{7}	6
WC	(France) J Eysseric (France) Q Halys	6^{5}	3
Alt	(United Kingdom) J O'Mara (United States) J Withrow	7	4	6
Alt	(Netherlands) S Arends (Poland) S Walków	5	6	1
(Italy) L Sonego (Italy) A Vavassori	7	7^{8}
14	(Australia) M Ebden (Australia) M Purcell	5	6^{6}
10	(United Kingdom) J Murray (Brazil) B Soares	6	6
(Israel) J Erlich (South Africa) L Harris	1	2
(United States) M McDonald (United States) T Paul	3	6	6
(Kazakhstan) A Nedovyesov (Pakistan) A-u-H Qureshi	6	2	3
(Germany) D Altmaier (Germany) O Otte	6^{4}	3
(India) R Ramanathan (United States) H Reese	7^{7}	6
(Netherlands) T Griekspoor (Netherlands) B van de Zandschulp	6	3	4
6	(Netherlands) W Koolhof (United Kingdom) N Skupski	4	6	6

Second round
4	(Spain) M Granollers (Argentina) H Zeballos	6	5	6
(France) A Mannarino (France) A Olivetti	2	7	0
Alt	(United Kingdom) J O'Mara (United States) J Withrow	7^{9}	7^{7}
(Italy) L Sonego (Italy) A Vavassori	6^{7}	6^{4}
10	(United Kingdom) J Murray (Brazil) B Soares	6^{7}	6	3
(United States) M McDonald (United States) T Paul	7^{9}	4	6
(India) R Ramanathan (United States) H Reese	3	2
6	(Netherlands) W Koolhof (United Kingdom) N Skupski	6	6

Third round
4	(Spain) M Granollers (Argentina) H Zeballos	6	6
Alt	(United Kingdom) J O'Mara (United States) J Withrow	1	1
(United States) M McDonald (United States) T Paul	3	2
6	(Netherlands) W Koolhof (United Kingdom) N Skupski	6	6

Quarterfinals
4	(Spain) M Granollers (Argentina) H Zeballos	3	6	6
6	(Netherlands) W Koolhof (United Kingdom) N Skupski	6	3	4

=== Bottom half ===
==== Section 3 ====
First round
7	(Germany) T Pütz (New Zealand) M Venus	6	6
(Australia) J Duckworth; I Ivashka	2	4
(France) B Bonzi (France) A Rinderknech	6	3	7^{10}
(Ukraine) D Molchanov (Croatia) F Škugor	3	6	6^{4}
(Argentina) F Delbonis (Bolivia) H Dellien	7^{11}	2	4
WC	(France) E Couacaud (France) M Guinard	6^{9}	6	6
(Mexico) H Hach Verdugo (Austria) P Oswald	6^{5}	3
12	(El Salvador) M Arévalo (Netherlands) J-J Rojer	7^{7}	6
13	(Mexico) S González (Argentina) A Molteni	2	3
(Brazil) R Matos (Spain) D Vega Hernández	6	6
(United States) D Kudla (Finland) E Ruusuvuori	4	2
(Poland) Ł Kubot (France) É Roger-Vasselin	6	6
(Australia) L Saville (Australia) J Thompson	7^{8}	7
(Serbia) D Lajović (Czech Republic) J Veselý	6^{6}	5
(Belgium) S Gillé (Belgium) J Vliegen	6	6^{5}	6
3	(France) P-H Herbert (France) N Mahut	4	7^{7}	3

Second round
7	(Germany) T Pütz (New Zealand) M Venus	6	6
(France) B Bonzi (France) A Rinderknech	4	4
WC	(France) E Couacaud (France) M Guinard	6	5	4
12	(El Salvador) M Arévalo (Netherlands) J-J Rojer	3	7	6
(Brazil) R Matos (Spain) D Vega Hernández	6	4	6
(Poland) Ł Kubot (France) É Roger-Vasselin	4	6	0
(Australia) L Saville (Australia) J Thompson	2	6	3
(Belgium) S Gillé (Belgium) J Vliegen	6	3	6

Third round
7	(Germany) T Pütz (New Zealand) M Venus	4	6	1
12	(El Salvador) M Arévalo (Netherlands) J-J Rojer	6	2	6
(Brazil) R Matos (Spain) D Vega Hernández	6	3	7^{10}
(Belgium) S Gillé (Belgium) J Vliegen	4	6	6^{6}

Quarterfinals
12	(El Salvador) M Arévalo (Netherlands) J-J Rojer	7^{8}	6
(Brazil) R Matos (Spain) D Vega Hernández	6^{6}	3

==== Section 4 ====
First round
5	(Colombia) JS Cabal (Colombia) R Farah	6^{4}	6^{4}
(France) B Paire (Spain) A Ramos Viñolas	7^{7}	7^{7}
(Bosnia and Herzegovina) T Brkić (Serbia) N Ćaćić	4	7^{7}	6^{7}
(Monaco) H Nys (Poland) J Zieliński	6	6^{3}	7^{10}
(Argentina) F Cerúndolo (Argentina) F Coria	2	4
(Uruguay) A Behar (Ecuador) G Escobar	6	6
(United Kingdom) L Glasspool (Finland) H Heliövaara	6	6
9	(Germany) K Krawietz (Germany) A Mies	4	2
16	(India) R Bopanna (Netherlands) M Middelkoop	6	6
WC	(France) S Gueymard Wayenburg (France) L Van Assche	4	1
(Argentina) S Báez (Brazil) F Meligeni Alves	5	3
(Kazakhstan) A Golubev (France) F Martin	7	6
WC	(France) H Gaston (France) G Simon	3	1
(Netherlands) R Haase (South Africa) R Klaasen	6	6
(Sweden) A Göransson (Japan) B McLachlan	2	5
2	(Croatia) N Mektić (Croatia) M Pavić	6	7

Second round
(France) B Paire (Spain) A Ramos Viñolas	2	3
(Monaco) H Nys (Poland) J Zieliński	6	6
(Uruguay) A Behar (Ecuador) G Escobar	4	2
(United Kingdom) L Glasspool (Finland) H Heliövaara	6	6
16	(India) R Bopanna (Netherlands) M Middelkoop	6	6
(Kazakhstan) A Golubev (France) F Martin	3	4
(Netherlands) R Haase (South Africa) R Klaasen	6^{5}	6	2
2	(Croatia) N Mektić (Croatia) M Pavić	7^{7}	4	6

Third round
(Monaco) H Nys (Poland) J Zieliński	6^{7}	3
(United Kingdom) L Glasspool (Finland) H Heliövaara	7^{9}	6
16	(India) R Bopanna (Netherlands) M Middelkoop	6^{5}	7^{7}	7^{12}
2	(Croatia) N Mektić (Croatia) M Pavić	7^{7}	6^{3}	6^{10}

Quarterfinals
(United Kingdom) L Glasspool (Finland) H Heliövaara	6	4	6^{3}
16	(India) R Bopanna (Netherlands) M Middelkoop	4	6	7^{10}

== Seeded teams ==
The following are the seeded teams, based on ATP rankings as of 16 May 2022.

Country	Player	Country	Player	Rank	Seed
USA	Rajeev Ram	GBR	Joe Salisbury	3	1
CRO	Nikola Mektić	CRO	Mate Pavić	8	2
FRA	Pierre-Hugues Herbert	FRA	Nicolas Mahut	11	3
ESP	Marcel Granollers	ARG	Horacio Zeballos	14	4
COL	Juan Sebastián Cabal	COL	Robert Farah	18	5
NED	Wesley Koolhof	GBR	Neal Skupski	24	6
GER	Tim Pütz	NZL	Michael Venus	28	7
AUS	John Peers	SVK	Filip Polášek	32	8
GER	Kevin Krawietz	GER	Andreas Mies	37	9
GBR	Jamie Murray	BRA	Bruno Soares	41	10
~~ITA~~	~~Simone Bolelli~~	~~ITA~~	~~Fabio Fognini~~	~~53~~	~~11~~
ESA	Marcelo Arévalo	NED	Jean-Julien Rojer	55	12
MEX	Santiago González	ARG	Andrés Molteni	63	13
AUS	Matthew Ebden	AUS	Max Purcell	64	14
ARG	Máximo González	BRA	Marcelo Melo	65	15
IND	Rohan Bopanna	NED	Matwé Middelkoop	65	16

== Other entry information ==
=== Wildcards ===
- (France) Enzo Couacaud / (France) Manuel Guinard
- (France) Sadio Doumbia / (France) Fabien Reboul
- (France) Jonathan Eysseric / (France) Quentin Halys
- ~~(France) Richard Gasquet / (France) Jo-Wilfried Tsonga~~
- (France) Hugo Gaston / (France) Gilles Simon
- (France) Sascha Gueymard Wayenburg / (France) Luca Van Assche
- (France) Ugo Humbert / (France) Constant Lestienne

=== Alternates ===
- (Netherlands) Sander Arends / (Poland) Szymon Walków
- ~~(Argentina) Tomás Martín Etcheverry / (Chile) Alejandro Tabilo~~
- (United Kingdom) Jonny O'Mara / (United States) Jackson Withrow

=== Withdrawals ===
- (Italy) Simone Bolelli / (Italy) Fabio Fognini → replaced by (Argentina) Tomás Martín Etcheverry / (Chile) Alejandro Tabilo
- (Portugal) Francisco Cabral / (Denmark) Holger Rune → replaced by (Netherlands) Sander Arends / (Poland) Szymon Walków
- (United Kingdom) Dan Evans / (United Kingdom) Jonny O'Mara → replaced by (France) Adrian Mannarino / (France) Albano Olivetti
- (France) Richard Gasquet / (France) Jo-Wilfried Tsonga → replaced by (United Kingdom) Jonny O'Mara / (United States) Jackson Withrow
- (Czech Republic) Roman Jebavý / (Slovakia) Alex Molčan → replaced by (Czech Republic) Roman Jebavý / (Serbia) Matej Sabanov
- (Chile) Julio Peralta / (Croatia) Franko Škugor → replaced by (Ukraine) Denys Molchanov / (Croatia) Franko Škugor
- (United States) Sam Querrey / (United States) Hunter Reese → replaced by (India) Ramkumar Ramanathan / (United States) Hunter Reese
