= 2020 Internazionali di Tennis Emilia Romagna =

- Date: 5–11 October
- Edition: 2nd
- Surface: Clay
- Location: Parma, Italy

Champions

Singles
- (United States) Frances Tiafoe

Doubles
- (El Salvador) Marcelo Arévalo / (Bosnia and Herzegovina) Tomislav Brkić
- Internazionali di Tennis Emilia Romagna

The 2020 Internazionali di Tennis Emilia Romagna was a professional tennis tournament played on clay courts. It was the second edition of the tournament which was part of the 2020 ATP Challenger Tour. It took place in Parma, Italy between 5 and 11 October 2020.

== Singles main-draw entrants ==
=== Seeds ===
| Country | Player | Rank^{1} | Seed |
|---|---|---|---|
| USA | Frances Tiafoe | 67 | 1 |
| ARG | Juan Ignacio Londero | 69 | 2 |
| SRB | Laslo Đere | 73 | 3 |
| ARG | Federico Delbonis | 81 | 4 |
| ITA | Salvatore Caruso | 85 | 5 |
| GER | Philipp Kohlschreiber | 86 | 6 |
| ITA | Gianluca Mager | 89 | 7 |
| ~~RSA~~ | ~~Lloyd Harris~~ | ~~90~~ | ~~8~~ |

- ^{1} Rankings are as of 28 September 2020.

=== Other entrants ===
The following players received wildcards into the singles main draw:

- (Italy) Marco Cecchinato
- (Italy) Lorenzo Musetti
- (Italy) Giulio Zeppieri

The following players received entry into the singles main draw as special exempts:

- (United States) Maxime Cressy
- (Uzbekistan) Denis Istomin

The following player received entry into the singles main draw as an alternate:

- (United States) Mitchell Krueger

The following players received entry from the qualifying draw:

- (Italy) Filippo Baldi
- (France) Hugo Grenier
- (Czech Republic) Tomáš Macháč
- (France) Alexandre Müller

The following player received entry as a lucky loser:

- (Argentina) Juan Pablo Ficovich

== Champions ==
=== Singles ===
- (United States) Frances Tiafoe def. (Italy) Salvatore Caruso 6–3, 3–6, 6–4.

=== Doubles ===
- (El Salvador) Marcelo Arévalo / (Bosnia and Herzegovina) Tomislav Brkić def. (Uruguay) Ariel Behar / (Ecuador) Gonzalo Escobar 6–4, 6–4.
