= Emilia-Romagna Open =

- 2026 Emilia-Romagna Open

Tournament information
- Event name: Emilia-Romagna Open
- Location: Parma (WTA), Sassuolo (ATP), Italy
- Venue: Tennis Club Parma (WTA: 2024-present), Sporting Club Sassuolo (ATP: 2024-present), Presidente Tennis Club in Montechiarugolo (until 2024)
- Surface: Clay
- Website: emiliaromagnatenniscup.com; parmaladiesopen.com

Current champions (2026)
- Men's singles: (France) Luca Van Assche
- Women's singles: (Ukraine) Dayana Yastremska
- Men's doubles: (Switzerland) Jakub Paul (United States) Ryan Seggerman
- Women's doubles: (Chinese Taipei) Cho I-hsuan (Chinese Taipei) Cho Yi-tsen
ATP Tour
- Category: ATP Challenger Tour 125
- Draw: 32S/16Q/16D
- Prize money: €203,900 (2026)
WTA Tour
- Category: WTA 125
- Draw: 32S / 8Q / 16D
- Prize money: US$115,000 (2026)

The Emilia-Romagna Open is a professional tennis tournament played on clay courts. It is currently a WTA 125 event (since 2023) on the WTA Tour for women and part of the ATP Challenger Tour 125 (since 2022) for men. It is held annually in Parma, Italy since 2021. Since 2024 it is held in Sassuolo, Province of Modena for men.

== Past finals ==
=== Women's singles ===
Year	Champion	Runner-up	Score
↓ WTA 250 event ↓
2021	(United States) Coco Gauff	(China) Wang Qiang	6–1, 6–3
2022	(Egypt) Mayar Sherif	(Greece) Maria Sakkari	7–5, 6–3
↓ WTA 125 event ↓
2023	(Romania) Ana Bogdan	(Slovakia) Anna Karolína Schmiedlová	7–5, 6–1
2024	(Slovakia) Anna Karolína Schmiedlová	(Egypt) Mayar Sherif	7–5, 2–6, 6–4
2025	(Egypt) Mayar Sherif (2)	(Canada) Victoria Mboko	6–4, 6–4
2026	(Ukraine) Dayana Yastremska	(Czech Republic) Barbora Krejčíková	6–3, 6–3

=== Women's doubles ===
Year	Champions	Runners-up	Score
↓ WTA 250 event ↓
2021	(United States) Coco Gauff (United States) Caty McNally	(Croatia) Darija Jurak (Slovenia) Andreja Klepač	6–3, 6–2
2022	(Czech Republic) Anastasia Dețiuc (Czech Republic) Miriam Kolodziejová	(Netherlands) Arantxa Rus (Slovenia) Tamara Zidanšek	1–6, 6–3, [10–8]
↓ WTA 125 event ↓
2023	(Slovenia) Dalila Jakupović; Irina Khromacheva	(Hungary) Anna Bondár (Belgium) Kimberley Zimmermann	6–2, 6–3
2024	(Kazakhstan) Anna Danilina; Irina Khromacheva (2)	(Brazil) Ingrid Gamarra Martins (France) Elixane Lechemia	6–1, 6–2
2025	(Czech Republic) Jesika Malečková (Czech Republic) Miriam Škoch (2)	(United States) Sabrina Santamaria (China) Tang Qianhui	6–2, 6–0
2026	(Chinese Taipei) Cho I-hsuan (Chinese Taipei) Cho Yi-tsen	(Italy) Marta Lombardini (Italy) Federica Urgesi	6–2, 6–2

=== Men's singles ===
Year	Champion	Runner-up	Score
↓ ATP Challenger Tour ↓
2019	(Spain) Tommy Robredo	(Italy) Federico Gaio	7–6^{(12–10)}, 5–7, 7–6^{(8–6)}
2020	(United States) Frances Tiafoe	(Italy) Salvatore Caruso	6–3, 3–6, 6–4
↓ ATP Tour 250 ↓
2021	(United States) Sebastian Korda	(Italy) Marco Cecchinato	6–2, 6–4
↓ ATP Challenger Tour ↓
2022	(Croatia) Borna Ćorić	(Sweden) Elias Ymer	7–6^{(7–4)}, 6–0
2023	(France) Alexandre Müller	(Italy) Francesco Maestrelli	6–1, 6–4
2024	(Netherlands) Jesper de Jong	(Germany) Daniel Altmaier	7–6^{(7–5)}, 6–1
2025	(Spain) Carlos Taberner	(Serbia) Dušan Lajović	7–6^{(7–1)}, 6–2
2026	(France) Luca Van Assche	(Austria) Sebastian Ofner	2–6, 6–2, 6–3

=== Men's doubles ===
Year	Champions	Runners-up	Score
2019	(Lithuania) Laurynas Grigelis (Italy) Andrea Pellegrino	(Uruguay) Ariel Behar (Ecuador) Gonzalo Escobar	1–6, 6–3, [10–7]
2020	(El Salvador) Marcelo Arévalo (Bosnia and Herzegovina) Tomislav Brkić	(Uruguay) Ariel Behar (Ecuador) Gonzalo Escobar	6–4, 6–4
↓ ATP Tour 250 ↓
2021	(Italy) Simone Bolelli (Argentina) Máximo González	(Austria) Oliver Marach (Pakistan) Aisam-ul-Haq Qureshi	6–3, 6–3
↓ ATP Challenger Tour ↓
2022	(Italy) Luciano Darderi (Brazil) Fernando Romboli	(Ukraine) Denys Molchanov (Slovakia) Igor Zelenay	6–2, 6–3
2023	(France) Jonathan Eysseric (Mexico) Miguel Ángel Reyes-Varela	(Switzerland) Luca Margaroli (India) Ramkumar Ramanathan	6–2, 6–3
2024	(Italy) Marco Bortolotti (Australia) Matthew Romios	(United States) Ryan Seggerman (United States) Patrik Trhac	7–6^{(9–7)}, 2–6, [11–9]
2025	(Australia) Matthew Romios (2) (United States) Ryan Seggerman	(Austria) Alexander Erler (Germany) Constantin Frantzen	7–6^{(7–4)}, 3–6, [10–7]
2026	(Switzerland) Jakub Paul (United States) Ryan Seggerman (2)	(Thailand) Pruchya Isaro (India) Niki Kaliyanda Poonacha	6–2, 7–6^{(7–5)}

== See also ==
- Internazionali di Modena
- Veneto Open
- Internazionali di Tennis Città di Parma
- Parma Challenger
