= 2024 Emilia-Romagna Open – Men's doubles =

Men's doubles
- 2024 Emilia-Romagna Open

Final
- Champions: (Italy) Marco Bortolotti (Australia) Matthew Romios
- Runners-up: (United States) Ryan Seggerman (United States) Patrik Trhac
- Score: 7–6^{(9–7)}, 2–6, [11–9]

Events
Singles	men	women
Doubles	men	women
← 2023 ·	Emilia-Romagna Open	· 2025 →

Jonathan Eysseric and Miguel Ángel Reyes-Varela were the defending champions but chose to defend their title with different partners. Eysseric partnered Blake Ellis but lost in the first round to Marco Bortolotti and Matthew Romios. Reyes-Varela partnered Guido Andreozzi but lost in the first round to Petr Nouza and Patrik Rikl.

Bortolotti and Romios won the title after defeating Ryan Seggerman and Patrik Trhac 7–6^{(9–7)}, 2–6, [11–9] in the final.

== Seeds ==
1. (Monaco) Romain Arneodo / (Austria) Sam Weissborn (quarterfinals)
2. (Argentina) Guido Andreozzi / (Mexico) Miguel Ángel Reyes-Varela (first round)
3. (Bolivia) Boris Arias / (Bolivia) Federico Zeballos (first round)
4. (Germany) Andre Begemann / (Romania) Victor Vlad Cornea (semifinals)

== Draw ==
=== Key ===
- Q = Qualifier
- WC = Wild card
- LL = Lucky loser
- Alt = Alternate
- ITF = ITF entry
- PR = Protected ranking
- SR = Special ranking
- SE = Special exempt
- JE = Junior exempt
- JR = Junior Accelerator Programme entrant
- CO = College Accelerator Programme entrant
- NG = Next Gen Accelerator Program entrant
- w/o = Walkover
- r = Retired
- d = Defaulted

=== Draw ===
First round
1	(Monaco) R Arneodo (Austria) S Weissborn	6	6
WC	(Italy) F Cinà (Italy) F Gaio	2	4
I Liutarevich (Spain) S Martos Gornés	6^{7}	6	[11]
(Brazil) M Demoliner (Argentina) G Durán	7^{9}	4	[13]
3	(Bolivia) B Arias (Bolivia) F Zeballos	3	4
(United States) R Seggerman (United States) P Trhac	6	6
WC	(Italy) F Bondioli (Italy) M Cecchinato	7	6
(Germany) D Altmaier (Venezuela) LD Martínez	5	4
(Ukraine) D Molchanov (Austria) P Oswald	6	5	[10]
(Japan) T Matsui (Japan) K Uesugi	4	7	[12]
Alt	(Sweden) F Bergevi (Netherlands) M Veldheer	4	2
4	(Germany) A Begemann (Romania) V Cornea	6	6
(Italy) M Bortolotti (Australia) MC Romios	6	6
(Australia) B Ellis (France) J Eysseric	4	0
(Czech Republic) P Nouza (Czech Republic) P Rikl	7^{7}	7^{7}
2	(Argentina) G Andreozzi (Mexico) MÁ Reyes-Varela	6^{3}	6^{4}

Quarterfinals
1	(Monaco) R Arneodo (Austria) S Weissborn	7	5	[8]
(Brazil) M Demoliner (Argentina) G Durán	5	7	[10]
(United States) R Seggerman (United States) P Trhac	w/o
WC	(Italy) F Bondioli (Italy) M Cecchinato
(Japan) T Matsui (Japan) K Uesugi	3	2
4	(Germany) A Begemann (Romania) V Cornea	6	6
(Italy) M Bortolotti (Australia) MC Romios	7^{7}	4	[11]
(Czech Republic) P Nouza (Czech Republic) P Rikl	6^{5}	6	[9]

Semifinals
(Brazil) M Demoliner (Argentina) G Durán	6	3	[9]
(United States) R Seggerman (United States) P Trhac	3	6	[11]
4	(Germany) A Begemann (Romania) V Cornea	6	5	[6]
(Italy) M Bortolotti (Australia) MC Romios	1	7	[10]

Final
(United States) R Seggerman (United States) P Trhac	6^{7}	6	[9]
(Italy) M Bortolotti (Australia) MC Romios	7^{9}	2	[11]
