= 2024 Emilia-Romagna Open – Singles =

Singles
- 2024 Emilia-Romagna Open

Final
- Champion: (Slovakia) Anna Karolína Schmiedlová
- Runner-up: (Egypt) Mayar Sherif
- Score: 7–5, 2–6, 6–4

Details
- Draw: 32
- Seeds: 8

Events
Singles	men	women
Doubles	men	women
← 2023 ·	Emilia-Romagna Open	· 2025 →

Last year's finalist Anna Karolína Schmiedlová won the title, defeating Mayar Sherif in the final, 7–5, 2–6, 6–4.

Ana Bogdan was the reigning champion, but chose to compete in Paris instead.

== Seeds ==
1. (Spain) Sara Sorribes Tormo (withdrew)
2. (Italy) Lucia Bronzetti (first round)
3. (United States) Ashlyn Krueger (withdrew)
4. (Slovakia) Anna Karolína Schmiedlová (champion)
5. (China) Wang Yafan (first round)
6. (Argentina) María Lourdes Carlé (first round)
7. (Switzerland) Viktorija Golubic (first round)
8. (Egypt) Mayar Sherif (final)
9. (Croatia) Petra Martić (second round)

== Draw ==
=== Key ===
- Q = Qualifier
- WC = Wild card
- LL = Lucky loser
- Alt = Alternate
- ITF = ITF entry
- PR = Protected ranking
- SR = Special ranking
- SE = Special exempt
- JE = Junior exempt
- JR = Junior Accelerator Programme entrant
- CO = College Accelerator Programme entrant
- NG = Next Gen Accelerator Program entrant
- w/o = Walkover
- r = Retired
- d = Defaulted

=== Finals ===
Semifinals
(Mexico) Renata Zarazúa	4	4
8	(Egypt) Mayar Sherif	6	6
4	(Slovakia) Anna Karolína Schmiedlová	6	6^{11}	7
(Germany) Jule Niemeier	4	7^{13}	5

Final
8	(Egypt) Mayar Sherif	5	6	4
4	(Slovakia) Anna Karolína Schmiedlová	7	2	6

=== Top half ===
First round
9	(Croatia) P Martić	4	7^{7}	6
Alt	(United States) V Lepchenko	6	6^{3}	2
(United States) P Stearns	6	6
WC	(Italy) J Ruggeri	2	1
WC	(Australia) A Tomljanović	3	6	6
WC	(Italy) N Brancaccio	6	3	1
(Mexico) R Zarazúa	6	6
7	(Switzerland) V Golubic	1	2
LL	(Czech Republic) A Sisková	1	2
(Australia) D Saville	6	6
(Italy) M Trevisan	2	4
K Rakhimova	6	6
Q	(Switzerland) S Bandecchi	6	6
E Makarova	4	1
Q	(Italy) M Colmegna	2	5
8	(Egypt) M Sherif	6	7

Second round
9	(Croatia) P Martić	3	6	2
(United States) P Stearns	6	0	6
WC	(Australia) A Tomljanović	0^{r}
(Mexico) R Zarazúa	3
(Australia) D Saville	4	5
K Rakhimova	6	7
Q	(Switzerland) S Bandecchi	3	5
8	(Egypt) M Sherif	6	7

Quarterfinals
(United States) P Stearns	4	4
(Mexico) R Zarazúa	6	6
K Rakhimova	3	5
8	(Egypt) M Sherif	6	7

Semifinals
(Mexico) R Zarazúa	4	4
8	(Egypt) M Sherif	6	6

=== Bottom half ===
First round
5	(China) Y Wang	6	4	3
Q	(Czech Republic) J Malečková	3	6	6
(Colombia) E Arango	6	6
(Italy) L Stefanini	4	3
WC	(Italy) G Pedone	6	7^{7}
(United States) A Parks	4	6^{5}
(Hungary) D Gálfi	3	6^{5}
4	(Slovakia) AK Schmiedlová	6	7^{7}
6	(Argentina) ML Carlé	4	6	0
(Germany) J Niemeier	6	4	6
(Australia) A Sharma	6	4	1
(India) A Raina	3	6	6
Q	(Ukraine) A Soboleva	6	4	6
(Canada) M Stakusic	3	6	3
(Turkey) Z Sönmez	6	6
2	(Italy) L Bronzetti	0	4

Second round
Q	(Czech Republic) J Malečková	7	0
(Colombia) E Arango	5	0^{r}
WC	(Italy) G Pedone	3	0
4	(Slovakia) AK Schmiedlová	6	6
(Germany) J Niemeier	6	6
(India) A Raina	1	3
Q	(Ukraine) A Soboleva	1	6	5
(Turkey) Z Sönmez	6	4	7

Quarterfinals
Q	(Czech Republic) J Malečková	0	5
4	(Slovakia) AK Schmiedlová	6	7
(Germany) J Niemeier	6	7
(Turkey) Z Sönmez	3	5

Semifinals
4	(Slovakia) AK Schmiedlová	6	6^{11}	7
(Germany) J Niemeier	4	7^{13}	5

== Qualifying ==
=== Seeds ===
1. (United States) Varvara Lepchenko (moved to main draw)
2. (Ukraine) Anastasiya Soboleva (qualified)
3. (Italy) Lisa Pigato (qualifying competition, retired)
4. (Czech Republic) Anna Sisková (qualifying competition, lucky loser)

=== Qualifiers ===
1. (Czech Republic) Jesika Malečková
2. (Ukraine) Anastasiya Soboleva
3. (Switzerland) Susan Bandecchi
4. (Italy) Martina Colmegna

=== Lucky loser ===
1. (Czech Republic) Anna Sisková

=== Draw ===
==== First qualifier ====
Qualifying competition
Alt	(Czech Republic) Jesika Malečková	6	6
	(Switzerland) Conny Perrin	3	0

==== Second qualifier ====
Qualifying competition
2	(Ukraine) Anastasiya Soboleva	6	6
WC	(Italy) Elena Bocchi	3	0

==== Third qualifier ====
Qualifying competition
3/WC	(Italy) Lisa Pigato	1	0^{r}
	(Switzerland) Susan Bandecchi	6	0

==== Fourth qualifier ====
Qualifying competition
4	(Czech Republic) Anna Sisková	6	4	6^{4}
	(Italy) Martina Colmegna	0	6	7^{7}
