= 2025 Emilia-Romagna Open – Men's singles =

Men's singles
- 2025 Emilia-Romagna Open

Final
- Champion: (Spain) Carlos Taberner
- Runner-up: (Serbia) Dušan Lajović
- Score: 7–6^{(7–1)}, 6–2

Events
Singles	men	women
Doubles	men	women
← 2024 ·	Emilia-Romagna Open	· 2026 →

Jesper de Jong was the defending champion but chose not to defend his title.

Carlos Taberner won the title after defeating Dušan Lajović 7–6^{(7–1)}, 6–2 in the final.

== Seeds ==
1. (Spain) Carlos Taberner (champion)
2. (Lithuania) Vilius Gaubas (first round)
3. (Serbia) Dušan Lajović (final)
4. (Italy) Francesco Passaro (semifinals, retired)
5. (Japan) Taro Daniel (first round)
6. (Switzerland) Stan Wawrinka (first round)
7. (Austria) Lukas Neumayer (second round)
8. (Ecuador) Álvaro Guillén Meza (first round)

== Draw ==
=== Key ===
- Q = Qualifier
- WC = Wild card
- LL = Lucky loser
- Alt = Alternate
- ITF = ITF entry
- PR = Protected ranking
- SR = Special ranking
- SE = Special exempt
- JE = Junior exempt
- JR = Junior Accelerator Programme entrant
- CO = College Accelerator Programme entrant
- NG = Next Gen Accelerator Program entrant
- w/o = Walkover
- r = Retired
- d = Defaulted

=== Finals ===
Semifinals
1	(Spain) Carlos Taberner	6	0
4	(Italy) Francesco Passaro	3	0^{r}
3	(Serbia) Dušan Lajović	6	6
(Mexico) Rodrigo Pacheco Méndez	3	2

Final
1	(Spain) Carlos Taberner	7^{7}	6
3	(Serbia) Dušan Lajović	6^{1}	2

=== Top half ===
First round
1	(Spain) C Taberner	6	6
(Slovakia) J Kovalík	4	0
(France) S Gueymard Wayenburg	4	6	1
WC	(Italy) F Bondioli	6	4	6
(France) G Blancaneaux	1	6^{4}
(France) L Van Assche	6	7^{7}
NG	(Japan) R Sakamoto	1	6	7^{8}
8	(Ecuador) Á Guillén Meza	6	3	6^{6}
4	(Italy) F Passaro	6	4	6
Q	(Ukraine) O Prihodko	3	6	1
Q	(Italy) G Fonio	2	2
LL	(Spain) O Roca Batalla	6	6
(Italy) F Arnaboldi	5	4
LL	(Italy) R Brancaccio	7	6
Q	(Sweden) E Ymer	3	7	6
6/WC	(Switzerland) S Wawrinka	6	5	3

Second round
1	(Spain) C Taberner	6	6
WC	(Italy) F Bondioli	4	1
(France) L Van Assche	6	6
NG	(Japan) R Sakamoto	2	3
4	(Italy) F Passaro	7^{7}	6
LL	(Spain) O Roca Batalla	6^{2}	3
LL	(Italy) R Brancaccio	6	4	3
Q	(Sweden) E Ymer	4	6	6

Quarterfinals
1	(Spain) C Taberner	6	4	7
(France) L Van Assche	4	6	5
4	(Italy) F Passaro	6	2	7^{7}
Q	(Sweden) E Ymer	3	6	6^{2}

Semifinals
1	(Spain) C Taberner	6	0
4	(Italy) F Passaro	3	0^{r}

=== Bottom half ===
First round
5	(Japan) T Daniel	4	0
(Spain) A Moro Cañas	6	6
(Belgium) M Geerts	6^{3}	7^{7}	1
(Italy) F Maestrelli	7^{7}	6^{5}	6
(Argentina) S Rodríguez Taverna	6^{5}	7	2
(Spain) A Ramos Viñolas	7^{7}	5	6
Q	(Netherlands) Ryan Nijboer	3	2
3	(Serbia) D Lajović	6	6
7	(Austria) L Neumayer	6	6
Alt	(Italy) S Travaglia	3	3
(Spain) D Rincón	7	3	6
Q	(Italy) M Cecchinato	5	6	3
WC	(Italy) G Zeppieri	6	6
Q	(Italy) S Napolitano	3	2
(Mexico) R Pacheco Méndez	6	7
2	(Lithuania) V Gaubas	0	5

Second round
(Spain) A Moro Cañas	4	4
(Italy) F Maestrelli	6	6
(Spain) A Ramos Viñolas	1	4
3	(Serbia) D Lajović	6	6
7	(Austria) L Neumayer	6	3	2
(Spain) D Rincón	2	6	6
WC	(Italy) G Zeppieri	7^{7}	6^{5}	4
(Mexico) R Pacheco Méndez	6^{1}	7^{7}	6

Quarterfinals
(Italy) F Maestrelli	4	6^{4}
3	(Serbia) D Lajović	6	7^{7}
(Spain) D Rincón	3	2
(Mexico) R Pacheco Méndez	6	6

Semifinals
3	(Serbia) D Lajović	6	6
(Mexico) R Pacheco Méndez	3	2
