= 2022 Emilia-Romagna Open – Men's singles =

Men's singles
- 2022 Emilia-Romagna Open

Final
- Champion: (Croatia) Borna Ćorić
- Runner-up: (Sweden) Elias Ymer
- Score: 7–6^{(7–4)}, 6–0

Events
Singles	men	women
Doubles	men	women
← 2021 ·	Emilia-Romagna Open	· 2023 →

Sebastian Korda was the defending champion but chose not to defend his title.

Borna Ćorić won the title after defeating Elias Ymer 7–6^{(7–4)}, 6–0 in the final.

== Seeds ==
1. (Argentina) Federico Coria (first round)
2. (Serbia) Dušan Lajović (semifinals)
3. (Bolivia) Hugo Dellien (withdrew)
4. (Argentina) Tomás Martín Etcheverry (second round)
5. (Spain) Carlos Taberner (second round)
6. (Spain) Roberto Carballés Baena (first round)
7. (Spain) Bernabé Zapata Miralles (first round)
8. (Brazil) Thiago Monteiro (second round)

== Draw ==
=== Key ===
- Q = Qualifier
- WC = Wild card
- LL = Lucky loser
- Alt = Alternate
- SE = Special exempt
- PR = Protected ranking
- ITF = ITF entry
- JE = Junior exempt
- w/o = Walkover
- r = Retired
- d = Defaulted
- SR = Special ranking

=== Finals ===
Semifinals
(Sweden) Elias Ymer	2	6	6
(Italy) Marco Cecchinato	6	3	2
WC	(Croatia) Borna Ćorić	6	7
2	(Serbia) Dušan Lajović	1	5

Final
(Sweden) Elias Ymer	6^{4}	0
WC	(Croatia) Borna Ćorić	7^{7}	6

=== Top half ===
First round
1	(Argentina) F Coria	2	1
(Colombia) DE Galán	6	6
(Slovakia) N Gombos	2	6^{7}
Alt	(Italy) A Arnaboldi	6	7^{9}
(Portugal) G Elias	6^{9}	4
(Sweden) E Ymer	7^{11}	6
Q	(Romania) ND Ionel	6	4	7^{8}
6	(Spain) R Carballés Baena	3	6	6^{6}
4	(Argentina) TM Etcheverry	6	6
SE	(Italy) R Bonadio	2	2
Q	(Spain) O Roca Batalla	5	6^{3}
(Chinese Taipei) C-h Tseng	7	7^{7}
(Italy) M Cecchinato	3	7^{8}	6
(Italy) L Nardi	6	6^{6}	2
Q	(United States) N Moreno de Alboran	6^{2}	6	3
5	(Spain) C Taberner	7^{7}	2	6

Second round
(Colombia) DE Galán	6^{6}	6	6^{2}
Alt	(Italy) A Arnaboldi	7^{8}	0	7^{7}
(Sweden) E Ymer	6	6
Q	(Romania) ND Ionel	1	4
4	(Argentina) TM Etcheverry	6	5	3
(Chinese Taipei) C-h Tseng	2	7	6
(Italy) M Cecchinato	6	6
5	(Spain) C Taberner	2	2

Quarterfinals
Alt	(Italy) A Arnaboldi	3	5
(Sweden) E Ymer	6	7
(Chinese Taipei) C-h Tseng	3	6	2
(Italy) M Cecchinato	6	4	6

Semifinals
(Sweden) E Ymer	2	6	6
(Italy) M Cecchinato	6	3	2

=== Bottom half ===
First round
8	(Brazil) T Monteiro	5	6	6
Q	(Portugal) J Domingues	7	2	4
(Italy) G Mager	7	3	2
WC	(Italy) G Zeppieri	5	6	6
WC	(Croatia) B Ćorić	6	6
(Italy) F Agamenone	3	3
(Italy) F Cobolli	6	4	6
LL	(Slovakia) A Martin	3	6	2
7	(Spain) B Zapata Miralles	6^{6}	6	4
Q	(Slovakia) J Kovalík	7^{8}	3	6
(Italy) S Caruso	3	1^{r}
(Italy) A Giannessi	6	3
(France) M Guinard	3	2
Q	(Belgium) M Geerts	6	6
WC	(Italy) F Passaro	5	4
2	(Serbia) D Lajović	7	6

Second round
8	(Brazil) T Monteiro	3	4
WC	(Italy) G Zeppieri	6	6
WC	(Croatia) B Ćorić	7	6
(Italy) F Cobolli	5	4
Q	(Slovakia) J Kovalík	6	6
(Italy) A Giannessi	1	3
Q	(Belgium) M Geerts	3	6^{3}
2	(Serbia) D Lajović	6	7^{7}

Quarterfinals
WC	(Italy) G Zeppieri	7^{7}	3	4
WC	(Croatia) B Ćorić	6^{5}	6	6
Q	(Slovakia) J Kovalík	4	2
2	(Serbia) D Lajović	6	6

Semifinals
WC	(Croatia) B Ćorić	6	7
2	(Serbia) D Lajović	1	5
