= 2023 Emilia-Romagna Open – Women's doubles =

Women's doubles
- 2023 Emilia-Romagna Open

Final
- Champions: (Slovenia) Dalila Jakupović; Irina Khromacheva
- Runners-up: (Hungary) Anna Bondár (Belgium) Kimberley Zimmermann
- Score: 6–2, 6–3

Events
Singles	men	women
Doubles	men	women
← 2022 ·	Emilia-Romagna Open	· 2024 →

Dalila Jakupović and Irina Khromacheva won the title, defeating Anna Bondár and Kimberley Zimmermann in the final, 6–2, 6–3.

Anastasia Dețiuc and Miriam Kolodziejová were the reigning champions, but both players chose to participate elsewhere; Dețiuc in Guangzhou and Kolodziejová in Guadalajara.

== Seeds ==
1. (Hungary) Anna Bondár / (Belgium) Kimberley Zimmermann (final)
2. (Spain) Aliona Bolsova / (Venezuela) Andrea Gámiz (first round)
3. (Slovenia) Dalila Jakupović / Irina Khromacheva (champions)
4. (Poland) Katarzyna Kawa / (France) Elixane Lechemia (quarterfinals)

== Draw ==
=== Key ===
- Q = Qualifier
- WC = Wild card
- LL = Lucky loser
- Alt = Alternate
- ITF = ITF entry
- PR = Protected ranking
- SR = Special ranking
- SE = Special exempt
- JE = Junior exempt
- JR = Junior Accelerator Programme entrant
- CO = College Accelerator Programme entrant
- NG = Next Gen Accelerator Program entrant
- w/o = Walkover
- r = Retired
- d = Defaulted

=== Draw ===
First round
1	(Hungary) A Bondár (Belgium) K Zimmermann	6	0
(France) C Monnet (Latvia) D Semeņistaja	2	0^{r}
(Italy) N Brancaccio (Italy) S Errani	w/o
(Italy) G Pedone (Italy) D Spiteri
4	(Poland) K Kawa (France) E Lechemia	6	6
(Croatia) M Dražić (Hungary) A Nagy	1	3
(United Kingdom) A Collins (Australia) A Osborne	2	2
(Netherlands) I Haverlag (Netherlands) E Vedder	6	6
(Italy) A Moratelli (Italy) C Rosatello	6	6
(United Kingdom) E Webley-Smith (Ukraine) K Zavatska	1	1
(United States) C Rosca (Australia) A Sharma	6^{5}	2
3	(Slovenia) D Jakupović; I Khromacheva	7^{7}	6
WC	(Italy) E Alvisi (Italy) J Ruggeri	6	3	[11]
A Fomina-Klotz (Switzerland) C Perrin	3	6	[9]
A Anshba (United Kingdom) E Appleton	7^{7}	5	[11]
2	(Spain) A Bolsova (Venezuela) A Gámiz	6^{2}	7	[9]

Quarterfinals
1	(Hungary) A Bondár (Belgium) K Zimmermann	7^{7}	6
(Italy) N Brancaccio (Italy) S Errani	6^{2}	2
4	(Poland) K Kawa (France) E Lechemia	1	0
(Netherlands) I Haverlag (Netherlands) E Vedder	6	6
(Italy) A Moratelli (Italy) C Rosatello	2	5
3	(Slovenia) D Jakupović; I Khromacheva	6	7
WC	(Italy) E Alvisi (Italy) J Ruggeri	5	2
A Anshba (United Kingdom) E Appleton	7	6

Semifinals
1	(Hungary) A Bondár (Belgium) K Zimmermann	w/o
(Netherlands) I Haverlag (Netherlands) E Vedder
3	(Slovenia) D Jakupović; I Khromacheva	7	6
A Anshba (United Kingdom) E Appleton	5	4

Final
1	(Hungary) A Bondár (Belgium) K Zimmermann	2	3
3	(Slovenia) D Jakupović; I Khromacheva	6	6
