= 2023 Emilia-Romagna Open =

- Date: 19–24 June (men); 18–23 September (women)
- Edition: 5th (men); 3rd (women)
- Category: ATP Challenger 125; WTA 125
- Prize money: €145,000 (men) $115,000 (women)
- Surface: Clay
- Location: Parma, Italy

Champions

Men's singles
- (France) Alexandre Müller

Women's singles
- (Romania) Ana Bogdan

Men's doubles
- (France) Jonathan Eysseric / (Mexico) Miguel Ángel Reyes-Varela

Women's doubles
- (Slovenia) Dalila Jakupović / Irina Khromacheva
← 2022 ·	Emilia-Romagna Open	· 2024 →

The 2023 Emilia-Romagna Open was a professional tennis tournament played on clay courts in Parma, Italy as an ATP Challenger Tour 125 event for the men and WTA 125 event for the women. The fifth edition of the men's event was held between 19 and 24 June on the 2023 ATP Challenger Tour and the third edition for the women as part of the 2023 WTA 125 tournaments between 18 and 23 September. The first two editions were part of the WTA Tour and held as WTA 250 tournament.

== Champions ==
=== Men's singles ===
- (France) Alexandre Müller def. (Italy) Francesco Maestrelli 6–1, 6–4.

=== Women's singles ===
- (Romania) Ana Bogdan def. (Slovakia) Anna Karolína Schmiedlová 7–5, 6–1

=== Men's doubles ===
- (France) Jonathan Eysseric / (Mexico) Miguel Ángel Reyes-Varela def. (Switzerland) Luca Margaroli / (India) Ramkumar Ramanathan 6–2, 6–3.

=== Women's doubles ===
- (Slovenia) Dalila Jakupović / Irina Khromacheva def. (Hungary) Anna Bondár / (Belgium) Kimberley Zimmermann 6–2, 6–3

== Men's singles main-draw entrants ==
=== Seeds ===
Country	Player	Rank^{1}	Seed
ESP	Albert Ramos Viñolas	70	1
BRA	Thiago Monteiro	94	2
FRA	Alexandre Müller	96	3
ESP	Jaume Munar	108	4
~~HUN~~	~~Fábián Marozsán~~	~~113~~	~~5~~
ITA	Giulio Zeppieri	128	6
ITA	Francesco Passaro	138	7
SVK	Jozef Kovalík	144	8

- ^{1} Rankings are as of 12 June 2023.

=== Other entrants ===
The following players received wildcards into the singles main draw:

- (Uruguay) Pablo Cuevas
- (Italy) Francesco Forti
- (Italy) Alexander Weis

The following players received entry into the singles main draw as alternates:

- (Italy) Edoardo Lavagno
- (Spain) Oriol Roca Batalla
- (Spain) Fernando Verdasco

The following players received entry from the qualifying draw:

- Bogdan Bobrov
- (Spain) Àlex Martí Pujolràs
- (Italy) Filippo Moroni
- (Italy) Stefano Napolitano
- (Kazakhstan) Dmitry Popko
- (Slovenia) Blaž Rola

The following player received entry as a lucky loser:

- (France) Maxime Janvier

== Women's singles main-draw entrants ==
=== Seeds ===
Country	Player	Rank^{†}	Seed
SVK	Anna Karolína Schmiedlová	58	1
ROU	Ana Bogdan	62	2
FRA	Clara Burel	66	3
BUL	Viktoriya Tomova	86	4
ROU	Jaqueline Cristian	98	5
SLO	Kaja Juvan	106	6
HUN	Anna Bondár	110	7
ESP	Aliona Bolsova	112	8

^{†} Rankings are as of 11 September 2023.

=== Other entrants ===
The following players received wildcard entry into the singles main draw:

- (Italy) Eleonora Alvisi
- (Italy) Silvia Ambrosio
- (Italy) Georgia Pedone
- (Italy) Jennifer Ruggeri

The following players received entry from qualifying draw:

- (Poland) Katarzyna Kawa
- (Croatia) Antonia Ružić
- (Italy) Dalila Spiteri
- (Netherlands) Eva Vedder

=== Withdrawals ===
Before the tournament

- (Austria) Julia Grabher → replaced by Erika Andreeva
- (Montenegro) Danka Kovinić → replaced by (France) Carole Monnet
- (Spain) Sara Sorribes Tormo → replaced by (Italy) Nuria Brancaccio

== Women's doubles draw entrants ==
=== Seeds ===
Country	Player	Country	Player	Rank^{1}	Seed
HUN	Anna Bondár	BEL	Kimberley Zimmermann	106	1
ESP	Aliona Bolsova	VEN	Andrea Gámiz	169	2
SLO	Dalila Jakupović		Irina Khromacheva	182	3
POL	Katarzyna Kawa	FRA	Elixane Lechemia	183	4

- ^{1} Rankings as of 18 September 2023.

=== Other entrants ===
The following pairs received wildcards into the doubles main draw:

- (Italy) Eleonora Alvisi / (Italy) Jennifer Ruggeri
- (Italy) Georgia Pedone / (Italy) Dalila Spiteri
