= 2022 Emilia-Romagna Open =

- Date: 13–19 June (men); 26 September–1 October (women)
- Edition: 4th (men); 2nd (women)
- Category: ATP Challenger 125; WTA 250
- Prize money: €134,920 (men) $251,750 (women)
- Surface: Clay
- Location: Parma, Italy

Champions

Men's singles
- (Croatia) Borna Ćorić

Women's singles
- (Egypt) Mayar Sherif

Men's doubles
- (Italy) Luciano Darderi / (Brazil) Fernando Romboli

Women's doubles
- (Czech Republic) Anastasia Dețiuc / (Czech Republic) Miriam Kolodziejová
← 2021 ·	Emilia-Romagna Open	· 2023 →

The 2022 Emilia-Romagna Open was a professional tennis tournament played on clay courts in Parma, Italy as an ATP Challenger Tour 125 event for the men and a WTA 250 event for the women. The fourth edition of the men's event was held between 13 and 19 June on the 2022 ATP Challenger Tour, while the second edition of the women's took place from 26 September to 1 October on the 2022 WTA Tour.

The women's event was one of the six tournaments that were given single-year WTA 250 licenses in September and October 2022 due to the cancellation of tournaments in China during the 2022 season because of the ongoing COVID-19 pandemic, as well as the suspension of tournaments in China following former WTA player Peng Shuai's allegation of sexual assault against a Chinese government official.

== Champions ==
=== Men's singles ===
- (Croatia) Borna Ćorić def. (Sweden) Elias Ymer 7–6^{(7–4)}, 6–0.

=== Women's singles ===
- (Egypt) Mayar Sherif def. (Greece) Maria Sakkari 7–5, 6–3

=== Men's doubles ===
- (Italy) Luciano Darderi / (Brazil) Fernando Romboli def. (Ukraine) Denys Molchanov / (Slovakia) Igor Zelenay 6–2, 6–3.

=== Women's doubles ===
- (Czech Republic) Anastasia Dețiuc / (Czech Republic) Miriam Kolodziejová def. (Netherlands) Arantxa Rus / (Slovenia) Tamara Zidanšek 1–6, 6–3, [10–8]

== Men's singles main-draw entrants ==
=== Seeds ===
Country	Player	Rank^{1}	Seed
ARG	Federico Coria	65	1
SRB	Dušan Lajović	69	2
~~BOL~~	~~Hugo Dellien~~	~~85~~	~~3~~
ARG	Tomás Martín Etcheverry	90	4
ESP	Carlos Taberner	91	5
ESP	Roberto Carballés Baena	94	6
ESP	Bernabé Zapata Miralles	97	7
BRA	Thiago Monteiro	99	8

- ^{1} Rankings are as of 6 June 2022.

=== Other entrants ===
The following players received wildcards into the singles main draw:

- (Croatia) Borna Ćorić
- (Italy) Francesco Passaro
- (Italy) Giulio Zeppieri

The following player received entry into the singles main draw as a special exempt:

- (Italy) Riccardo Bonadio

The following player received entry into the singles main draw as an alternate:

- (Italy) Andrea Arnaboldi

The following players received entry from the qualifying draw:

- (Portugal) João Domingues
- (Belgium) Michael Geerts
- (Romania) David Ionel
- (Slovakia) Jozef Kovalík
- (United States) Nicolas Moreno de Alboran
- (Spain) Oriol Roca Batalla

The following player received entry as a lucky loser:

- (Slovakia) Andrej Martin

== Women's singles main-draw entrants ==
=== Seeds ===
Country	Player	Rank^{†}	Seed
GRE	Maria Sakkari	6	1
ITA	Martina Trevisan	27	2
ROU	Irina-Camelia Begu	33	3
USA	Sloane Stephens	50	4
HUN	Anna Bondár	52	5
ROU	Ana Bogdan	54	6
ESP	Nuria Párrizas Díaz	61	7
ITA	Lucia Bronzetti	63	8

^{†} Rankings are as of 19 September 2022.

=== Other entrants ===
The following players received wildcard entry into the singles main draw:

- (Italy) Sara Errani
- (Italy) Matilde Paoletti
- (Greece) Maria Sakkari

The following players received entry from qualifying draw:

- Erika Andreeva
- (Ukraine) Kateryna Baindl
- (Hungary) Réka Luca Jani
- (Germany) Jule Niemeier
- (Slovakia) Anna Karolína Schmiedlová
- (Switzerland) Simona Waltert

The following player received entry as a lucky loser:

- (Romania) Gabriela Lee

=== Withdrawals ===
Before the tournament

- (France) Alizé Cornet → replaced by (Italy) Elisabetta Cocciaretto
- Varvara Gracheva → replaced by (Romania) Gabriela Lee
- (Slovenia) Kaja Juvan → replaced by (Netherlands) Arantxa Rus
- Anna Kalinskaya → replaced by (Belgium) Maryna Zanevska
- (Germany) Tatjana Maria → replaced by (Brazil) Laura Pigossi
- (Kazakhstan) Yulia Putintseva → replaced by (France) Océane Dodin
- Liudmila Samsonova → replaced by (Bulgaria) Viktoriya Tomova

== Women's doubles draw entrants ==
=== Seeds ===
Country	Player	Country	Player	Rank^{1}	Seed
HUN	Anna Bondár	BEL	Kimberley Zimmermann	106	1
USA	Kaitlyn Christian	CHN	Han Xinyun	133	2
KAZ	Anna Danilina	CZE	Jesika Malečková	173	3
HUN	Tímea Babos	USA	Angela Kulikov	188	4

- ^{1} Rankings as of 19 September 2022.

=== Other entrants ===
The following pairs received wildcards into the doubles main draw:

- (Italy) Elisabetta Cocciaretto / (Italy) Matilde Paoletti
- (Italy) Francesca Pace / (Italy) Federica Urgesi

=== Withdrawals ===
Before the tournament

- (United States) Kaitlyn Christian / Lidziya Marozava → replaced by (United States) Kaitlyn Christian / (China) Han Xinyun
- (Venezuela) Andrea Gámiz / (Netherlands) Eva Vedder → replaced by Alena Fomina-Klotz / Oksana Selekhmeteva
- (Czech Republic) Jesika Malečková / (Romania) Raluca Olaru → replaced by (Kazakhstan) Anna Danilina / (Czech Republic) Jesika Malečková
- Alexandra Panova / (Poland) Katarzyna Piter → replaced by (United Kingdom) Emily Appleton / (United States) Quinn Gleason
