= 2025 Emilia-Romagna Open – Women's doubles =

Women's doubles
- 2025 Emilia-Romagna Open

Final
- Champions: (Czech Republic) Jesika Malečková (Czech Republic) Miriam Škoch
- Runners-up: (United States) Sabrina Santamaria (China) Tang Qianhui
- Score: 6–2, 6–0

Events
Singles	men	women
Doubles	men	women
← 2024 ·	Emilia-Romagna Open	· 2026 →

Jesika Malečková and Miriam Škoch won the title, defeating Sabrina Santamaria and Tang Qianhui in the final, 6–2, 6–0.

Anna Danilina and Irina Khromacheva were the reigning champions, but Khromacheva chose to participate in Paris instead. Danilina partnered Angelica Moratelli, but lost in the quarterfinals to Nicole Fossa Huergo and Zhibek Kulambayeva.

== Seeds ==
1. (Kazakhstan) Anna Danilina / (Italy) Angelica Moratelli (quarterfinals)
2. (China) Xu Yifan / (China) Zheng Saisai (first round)
3. (Poland) Katarzyna Piter / (Egypt) Mayar Sherif (first round)
4. (United States) Sabrina Santamaria / (China) Tang Qianhui (final)

== Draw ==
=== Key ===
- Q = Qualifier
- WC = Wild card
- LL = Lucky loser
- Alt = Alternate
- ITF = ITF entry
- PR = Protected ranking
- SR = Special ranking
- SE = Special exempt
- JE = Junior exempt
- JR = Junior Accelerator Programme entrant
- CO = College Accelerator Programme entrant
- NG = Next Gen Accelerator Program entrant
- w/o = Walkover
- r = Retired
- d = Defaulted

=== Draw ===
First round
1	(Kazakhstan) A Danilina (Italy) A Moratelli	6	6
(Belgium) Y Wickmayer (Belgium) K Zimmermann	3	2
(Hungary) A Bondár (Switzerland) J Teichmann	6	4	[8]
(Italy) N Fossa Huergo (Kazakhstan) Z Kulambayeva	3	6	[10]
3	(Poland) K Piter (Egypt) M Sherif	6^{5}	6	[10]
(Netherlands) I Haverlag (United Kingdom) M Lumsden	7^{7}	4	[12]
(Colombia) E Arango (Mexico) R Zarazúa	6^{2}	4
(Czech Republic) J Malečková (Czech Republic) M Škoch	7^{7}	6
(United Kingdom) A Barnett (France) E Lechemia	6	6
(United States) J Aney (United States) J Failla	4	3
(Belgium) M Kempen (Brazil) I Martins	4	2
4	(United States) S Santamaria (China) Q Tang	6	6
(Spain) Y Cavallé Reimers (Belgium) L Salden	1	6	[10]
WC	(Italy) A Abbagnato (Italy) A Zucchini	6	4	[7]
(Czech Republic) A Dețiuc (United Kingdom) E Silva	6	1	[10]
2	(China) Y Xu (China) S Zheng	4	6	[6]

Quarterfinals
1	(Kazakhstan) A Danilina (Italy) A Moratelli	4	4
(Italy) N Fossa Huergo (Kazakhstan) Z Kulambayeva	6	6
(Netherlands) I Haverlag (United Kingdom) M Lumsden	3	3
(Czech Republic) J Malečková (Czech Republic) M Škoch	6	6
(United Kingdom) A Barnett (France) E Lechemia	7^{7}	4	[1]
4	(United States) S Santamaria (China) Q Tang	6^{5}	6	[10]
(Spain) Y Cavallé Reimers (Belgium) L Salden	0	6	[10]
(Czech Republic) A Dețiuc (United Kingdom) E Silva	6	0	[7]

Semifinals
(Italy) N Fossa Huergo (Kazakhstan) Z Kulambayeva	4	6	[9]
(Czech Republic) J Malečková (Czech Republic) M Škoch	6	3	[11]
4	(United States) S Santamaria (China) Q Tang	6	6
(Spain) Y Cavallé Reimers (Belgium) L Salden	4	4

Final
(Czech Republic) J Malečková (Czech Republic) M Škoch	6	6
4	(United States) S Santamaria (China) Q Tang	2	0
