= 2023 Emilia-Romagna Open – Women's singles =

Women's singles
- 2023 Emilia-Romagna Open

Final
- Champion: (Romania) Ana Bogdan
- Runner-up: (Slovakia) Anna Karolína Schmiedlová
- Score: 7–5, 6–1

Details
- Draw: 32
- Seeds: 8

Events
Singles	men	women
Doubles	men	women
← 2022 ·	Emilia-Romagna Open	· 2024 →

Ana Bogdan won the title, defeating Anna Karolína Schmiedlová in the final, 7–5, 6–1. It was a rematch of the previous year's second round, with Bogdan also winning.

Mayar Sherif was the reigning champion, but chose to compete in Guadalajara instead.

== Seeds ==
1. (Slovakia) Anna Karolína Schmiedlová (final)
2. (Romania) Ana Bogdan (champion)
3. (France) Clara Burel (first round)
4. (Bulgaria) Viktoriya Tomova (quarterfinals)
5. (Romania) Jaqueline Cristian (quarterfinals)
6. (Slovenia) Kaja Juvan (quarterfinals)
7. (Hungary) Anna Bondár (semifinals)
8. (Spain) Aliona Bolsova (second round)

== Draw ==
=== Key ===
- Q = Qualifier
- WC = Wild card
- LL = Lucky loser
- Alt = Alternate
- ITF = ITF entry
- PR = Protected ranking
- SR = Special ranking
- SE = Special exempt
- JE = Junior exempt
- JR = Junior Accelerator Programme entrant
- CO = College Accelerator Programme entrant
- NG = Next Gen Accelerator Program entrant
- w/o = Walkover
- r = Retired
- d = Defaulted

=== Finals ===
Semifinals
1	(Slovakia) Anna Karolína Schmiedlová	7	7
Q	(Poland) Katarzyna Kawa	5	5
7	(Hungary) Anna Bondár	3	4
2	(Romania) Ana Bogdan	6	6

Final
1	(Slovakia) Anna Karolína Schmiedlová	5	1
2	(Romania) Ana Bogdan	7	6

=== Top half ===
First round
1	(Slovakia) AK Schmiedlová	6	6
(France) C Monnet	3	4
(Switzerland) Y In-Albon	6	1	1
(Hungary) RL Jani	4	6	6
WC	(Italy) J Ruggeri	3	4
(France) C Paquet	6	6
(Germany) N Noha Akugue	4	4
6	(Slovenia) K Juvan	6	6
3	(France) C Burel	2	1
(Hungary) D Gálfi	6	6
(Italy) N Brancaccio	2	4
(Spain) J Bouzas Maneiro	6	6
Q	(Poland) K Kawa	6	6
(Latvia) D Semeņistaja	1	3
Q	(Italy) D Spiteri	1	6^{1}
8	(Spain) A Bolsova	6	7^{7}

Second round
1	(Slovakia) AK Schmiedlová	6	6
(Hungary) RL Jani	3	2
(France) C Paquet	6	4	1
6	(Slovenia) K Juvan	3	6	6
(Hungary) D Gálfi	1	0
(Spain) J Bouzas Maneiro	6	6
Q	(Poland) K Kawa	6	6
8	(Spain) A Bolsova	4	4

Quarterfinals
1	(Slovakia) AK Schmiedlová	6	6^{4}	6
6	(Slovenia) K Juvan	1	7^{7}	4
(Spain) J Bouzas Maneiro	2	6	3
Q	(Poland) K Kawa	6	4	6

Semifinals
1	(Slovakia) AK Schmiedlová	7	7
Q	(Poland) K Kawa	5	5

=== Bottom half ===
First round
7	(Hungary) A Bondár	6	6
WC	(Italy) S Ambrosio	2	2
WC	(Italy) G Pedone	3	6^{2}
Q	(Croatia) A Ružić	6	7^{7}
(Slovenia) D Jakupović	4	3
E Andreeva	6	6
WC	(Italy) E Alvisi	5	6	0
4	(Bulgaria) V Tomova	7	1	6
5	(Romania) J Cristian	6	6
(Italy) S Errani	2	4
(Turkey) Z Sönmez	1	1
Q	(Netherlands) E Vedder	6	6
(Ukraine) K Zavatska	7	4	6
SE	(Australia) A Sharma	5	6	3
(Spain) M Bassols Ribera	1	5
2	(Romania) A Bogdan	6	7

Second round
7	(Hungary) A Bondár	6	6
Q	(Croatia) A Ružić	1	4
E Andreeva	4	4
4	(Bulgaria) V Tomova	6	6
5	(Romania) J Cristian	6	6
Q	(Netherlands) E Vedder	4	3
(Ukraine) K Zavatska	6	2	4
2	(Romania) A Bogdan	4	6	6

Quarterfinals
7	(Hungary) A Bondár	7	6
4	(Bulgaria) V Tomova	5	4
5	(Romania) J Cristian	6	1	6^{1}
2	(Romania) A Bogdan	4	6	7^{7}

Semifinals
7	(Hungary) A Bondár	3	4
2	(Romania) A Bogdan	6	6

== Qualifying ==
=== Seeds ===
1. (Poland) Katarzyna Kawa (qualified)
2. (Italy) Camilla Rosatello (qualifying competition)
3. (Netherlands) Eva Vedder (qualified)
4. (Croatia) Antonia Ružić (qualified)

=== Qualifiers ===
1. (Poland) Katarzyna Kawa
2. (Italy) Dalila Spiteri
3. (Netherlands) Eva Vedder
4. (Croatia) Antonia Ružić

=== Draw ===
==== First qualifier ====
Qualifying competition
1	(Poland) Katarzyna Kawa	6	6
	Irina Khromacheva	3	3

==== Second qualifier ====
Qualifying competition
2	(Italy) Camilla Rosatello	1	4
	(Italy) Dalila Spiteri	6	6

==== Third qualifier ====
Qualifying competition
3	(Netherlands) Eva Vedder	6	6
WC	(Italy) Laura Mair	1	4

==== Fourth qualifier ====
Qualifying competition
4	(Croatia) Antonia Ružić	6	6
	(Italy) Elena Bocchi	3	2
