= 2024 Emilia-Romagna Open =

- Date: 13–18 May (women); 17–22 June (men)
- Edition: 4th (women); 6th (men)
- Category: ATP Challenger 125; WTA 125
- Surface: Clay
- Location: Sassuolo, Italy (men); Parma, Italy (women)

Champions

Men's singles
- (Netherlands) Jesper de Jong

Women's singles
- (Slovakia) Anna Karolína Schmiedlová

Men's doubles
- (Italy) Marco Bortolotti / (Australia) Matthew Romios

Women's doubles
- (Kazakhstan) Anna Danilina / Irina Khromacheva
| ← 2023 · | Emilia-Romagna Open | · 2025 → |

The 2024 Emilia-Romagna Open, known as the Emilia-Romagna Tennis Cup for men and Parma Ladies Open for women, was a professional tennis tournament played on clay courts in Sassuolo, Italy as an ATP Challenger Tour 125 event and in Parma, Italy as a WTA 125 event. The sixth edition of the men's event was held between 17 and 22 June on the 2024 ATP Challenger Tour and the fourth edition for the women as part of the 2024 WTA 125 tournaments between 13 and 18 May.

== Champions ==
=== Men's singles ===
- (Netherlands) Jesper de Jong def. (Germany) Daniel Altmaier 7–6^{(7–5)}, 6–1.

=== Women's singles ===
- (Slovakia) Anna Karolína Schmiedlová def. (Egypt) Mayar Sherif, 7–5, 2–6, 6–4

=== Men's doubles ===
- (Italy) Marco Bortolotti / (Australia) Matthew Romios def. (United States) Ryan Seggerman / (United States) Patrik Trhac 7–6^{(9–7)}, 2–6, [11–9].

=== Women's doubles ===
- (Kazakhstan) Anna Danilina / Irina Khromacheva def. (France) Elixane Lechemia / (Brazil) Ingrid Martins, 6–1, 6–2

== Men's singles main-draw entrants ==
=== Seeds ===
| Country | Player | Rank^{1} | Seed |
|---|---|---|---|
| ARG | Federico Coria | 69 | 1 |
| FRA | Alexandre Müller | 78 | 2 |
| CRO | Borna Ćorić | 88 | 3 |
| GER | Daniel Altmaier | 89 | 4 |
| ITA | Fabio Fognini | 102 | 5 |
| FRA | Luca Van Assche | 105 | 6 |
| ARG | Francisco Comesaña | 120 | 7 |
| ARG | Thiago Agustín Tirante | 124 | 8 |

- ^{1} Rankings are as of 10 June 2024.

=== Other entrants ===
The following players received wildcards into the singles main draw:

- (Italy) Federico Arnaboldi
- (Italy) Federico Cinà
- (Italy) Fabio Fognini

The following players received entry into the singles main draw as alternates:

- (Argentina) Juan Pablo Ficovich
- Egor Gerasimov
- (Czech Republic) Jiří Veselý

The following players received entry from the qualifying draw:

- (Argentina) Guido Andreozzi
- (Italy) Riccardo Bonadio
- (Italy) Marco Cecchinato
- (Slovakia) Martin Kližan
- (France) Valentin Royer
- (Italy) Alexander Weis

== Women's singles main-draw entrants ==
=== Seeds ===
| Country | Player | Rank^{†} | Seed |
|---|---|---|---|
| ~~ESP~~ | ~~Sara Sorribes Tormo~~ | ~~47~~ | ~~1~~ |
| ITA | Lucia Bronzetti | 48 | 2 |
| ~~USA~~ | ~~Ashlyn Krueger~~ | ~~66~~ | ~~3~~ |
| SVK | Anna Karolína Schmiedlová | 67 | 4 |
| CHN | Wang Yafan | 69 | 5 |
| ARG | María Lourdes Carlé | 71 | 6 |
| SUI | Viktorija Golubic | 74 | 7 |
| EGY | Mayar Sherif | 80 | 8 |
| CRO | Petra Martić | 81 | 9 |

^{†} Rankings are as of 6 May 2024.

=== Other entrants ===
The following players received wildcard entry into the singles main draw:

- (Italy) Nuria Brancaccio
- (Italy) Giorgia Pedone
- (Italy) Jennifer Ruggeri
- (Australia) Ajla Tomljanović

The following players received entry from qualifying draw:

- (Switzerland) Susan Bandecchi
- (Italy) Martina Colmegna
- (Czech Republic) Jesika Malečková
- (Ukraine) Anastasiya Soboleva

The following player received entry as a lucky loser:

- (Czech Republic) Anna Sisková

=== Withdrawals ===
Before the tournament

- (Czech Republic) Marie Bouzková → replaced by (United States) Alycia Parks
- (Italy) Elisabetta Cocciaretto → replaced by (Italy) Lucrezia Stefanini
- (United States) Sofia Kenin → replaced by (Canada) Marina Stakusic
- (United States) Ashlyn Krueger → replaced by (Czech Republic) Anna Sisková
- (Poland) Magda Linette → replaced by (Hungary) Dalma Gálfi
- (Colombia) Camila Osorio → replaced by (Mexico) Renata Zarazúa
- (United States) Bernarda Pera → replaced by (Turkey) Zeynep Sönmez
- (Kazakhstan) Yulia Putintseva → replaced by (Colombia) Emiliana Arango
- (Germany) Laura Siegemund → replaced by (Germany) Jule Niemeier
- (Spain) Sara Sorribes Tormo → replaced by (United States) Varvara Lepchenko
- Maria Timofeeva → replaced by Ekaterina Makarova
- (United States) Taylor Townsend → replaced by (Australia) Astra Sharma
- (China) Wang Xinyu → replaced by (India) Ankita Raina

== Women's doubles draw entrants ==
=== Seeds ===
| Country | Player | Country | Player | Rank^{1} | Seed |
|---|---|---|---|---|---|
| KAZ | Anna Danilina | | Irina Khromacheva | 103 | 1 |
| FRA | Elixane Lechemia | BRA | Ingrid Martins | 139 | 2 |
| CZE | Miriam Kolodziejová | CZE | Anna Sisková | 149 | 3 |
| GBR | Alicia Barnett | GBR | Freya Christie | 260 | 4 |

- ^{1} Rankings as of 6 May 2024.

=== Other entrants ===
The following pairs received wildcards into the doubles main draw:

- (Italy) Nuria Brancaccio / (Italy) Giorgia Pedone
- (Italy) Lisa Pigato / (Italy) Jennifer Ruggeri
