= 2022 Emilia-Romagna Open – Women's doubles =

Women's doubles
- 2022 Emilia-Romagna Open

Final
- Champions: (Czech Republic) Anastasia Dețiuc (Czech Republic) Miriam Kolodziejová
- Runners-up: (Netherlands) Arantxa Rus (Slovenia) Tamara Zidanšek
- Score: 1–6, 6–3, [10–8]

Events
Singles	men	women
Doubles	men	women
← 2021 ·	Emilia-Romagna Open	· 2023 →

Anastasia Dețiuc and Miriam Kolodziejová defeated Arantxa Rus and Tamara Zidanšek in the final, 1–6, 6–3, [10–8] to win the women's doubles tennis title at the 2022 Emilia-Romagna Open. This was both players' first WTA Tour doubles title.

Coco Gauff and Caty McNally were the reigning champions, but did not participate.

== Seeds ==
1. (Hungary) Anna Bondár / (Belgium) Kimberley Zimmermann (first round)
2. (United States) Kaitlyn Christian / (China) Han Xinyun (first round)
3. (Kazakhstan) Anna Danilina / (Czech Republic) Jesika Malečková (quarterfinals)
4. (Hungary) Tímea Babos / (United States) Angela Kulikov (quarterfinals)

== Draw ==
=== Key ===
- Q = Qualifier
- WC = Wild card
- LL = Lucky loser
- Alt = Alternate
- ITF = ITF entry
- PR = Protected ranking
- SR = Special ranking
- SE = Special exempt
- JE = Junior exempt
- JR = Junior Accelerator Programme entrant
- CO = College Accelerator Programme entrant
- NG = Next Gen Accelerator Program entrant
- w/o = Walkover
- r = Retired
- d = Defaulted

=== Draw ===
First round
1	(Hungary) A Bondár (Belgium) K Zimmermann	4	3
(Poland) P Kania-Choduń (Czech Republic) R Voráčová	6	6
(Italy) J Paolini (Italy) M Trevisan	6	7^{9}
WC	(Italy) F Pace (Italy) F Urgesi	0	6^{7}
3	(Kazakhstan) A Danilina (Czech Republic) J Malečková	6	6
(United Kingdom) E Appleton (United States) Q Gleason	1	0
A Gabueva; A Zakharova	0	2
(Czech Republic) A Dețiuc (Czech Republic) M Kolodziejová	6	6
(Netherlands) A Rus (Slovenia) T Zidanšek	6	6
WC	(Italy) E Cocciaretto (Italy) M Paoletti	0	4
A Fomina-Klotz; O Selekhmeteva	6^{7}	4
4	(Hungary) T Babos (United States) A Kulikov	7^{9}	6
(Romania) G Lee (United States) A Parks	4	6	[10]
(France) E Lechemia (Germany) J Lohoff	6	3	[8]
(Brazil) I Gamarra Martins (Spain) N Párrizas Díaz	6	6
2	(United States) K Christian (China) X Han	3	0

Quarterfinals
(Poland) P Kania-Choduń (Czech Republic) R Voráčová	6	6
(Italy) J Paolini (Italy) M Trevisan	2	4
3	(Kazakhstan) A Danilina (Czech Republic) J Malečková	0	4
(Czech Republic) A Dețiuc (Czech Republic) M Kolodziejová	6	6
(Netherlands) A Rus (Slovenia) T Zidanšek	6	6
4	(Hungary) T Babos (United States) A Kulikov	4	3
(Romania) G Lee (United States) A Parks	1	6^{0}
(Brazil) I Gamarra Martins (Spain) N Párrizas Díaz	6	7^{7}

Semifinals
(Poland) P Kania-Choduń (Czech Republic) R Voráčová	6	3	[8]
(Czech Republic) A Dețiuc (Czech Republic) M Kolodziejová	1	6	[10]
(Netherlands) A Rus (Slovenia) T Zidanšek	6	6
(Brazil) I Gamarra Martins (Spain) N Párrizas Díaz	4	3

Final
(Czech Republic) A Dețiuc (Czech Republic) M Kolodziejová	1	6	[10]
(Netherlands) A Rus (Slovenia) T Zidanšek	6	3	[8]
