= 2025 Emilia-Romagna Open – Women's singles =

Tennis tournament

Women's singles
- 2025 Emilia-Romagna Open

Final
- Champion: (Egypt) Mayar Sherif
- Runner-up: (Canada) Victoria Mboko
- Score: 6–4, 6–4

Details
- Draw: 32 (4 WC)
- Seeds: 8

Events
Singles	men	women
Doubles	men	women
- Emilia-Romagna Open

Anna Karolína Schmiedlová was the reigning champion, but did not participate this year due to pregnancy.

Mayar Sherif won the title, after defeating Victoria Mboko in the final, 6–4, 6–4.

== Seeds ==
1. (Kazakhstan) Yulia Putintseva (quarterfinals, withdrew)
2. (China) Wang Xinyu (quarterfinals)
3. (United States) Alycia Parks (first round)
4. (Colombia) Camila Osorio (first round)
5. (Egypt) Mayar Sherif (champion)
6. (Mexico) Renata Zarazúa (second round)
7. (Turkey) Zeynep Sönmez (first round)
8. (Romania) Irina-Camelia Begu (semifinals)

== Draw ==
Key

- Q = Qualifier
- WC = Wild card
- LL = Lucky loser
- Alt = Alternate
- ITF = ITF entry
- PR = Protected ranking
- SR = Special ranking
- SE = Special exempt
- JE = Junior exempt
- JR = Junior Accelerator Programme entrant
- CO = College Accelerator Programme entrant
- NG = Next Gen Accelerator Program entrant
- w/o = Walkover
- r = Retired
- d = Defaulted

=== Finals ===
Semifinals
5	(Egypt) Mayar Sherif	6	6
(Switzerland) Simona Waltert	4	4
8	(Romania) Irina-Camelia Begu	1	3
(Canada) Victoria Mboko	6	6

Final
5	(Egypt) Mayar Sherif	6	6
(Canada) Victoria Mboko	4	4

=== Top half ===
First round
1	(Kazakhstan) Y Putintseva	6	6
(Japan) E Shibahara	3	4
Q	(Germany) A-L Friedsam	6	4	6
(Colombia) E Arango	3	6	4
(Australia) P Hon	2	6	6
(Germany) E Seidel	6	2	4
(Liechtenstein) K von Deichmann	5	2
5	(Egypt) M Sherif	7	6
4/WC	(Colombia) C Osorio	3	1
(Canada) M Stakusic	6	6
(Croatia) A Ružić	6	6
WC	(Italy) A Zantedeschi	0	2
(Switzerland) S Waltert	6	6
(China) Xiy Wang	3	3
Q	(Romania) PM Țig	5	0
6	(Mexico) R Zarazúa	7	6

Second round
1	(Kazakhstan) Y Putintseva	6	6
Q	(Germany) A-L Friedsam	4	4
(Australia) P Hon	3	3
5	(Egypt) M Sherif	6	6
(Canada) M Stakusic	4	6	6
(Croatia) A Ružić	6	1	4
(Switzerland) S Waltert	6	6
6	(Mexico) R Zarazúa	4	3

Quarterfinals
1	(Kazakhstan) Y Putintseva
5	(Egypt) M Sherif	w/o
(Canada) M Stakusic	6	2	5
(Switzerland) S Waltert	3	6	7

Semifinals
5	(Egypt) M Sherif	6	6
(Switzerland) S Waltert	4	4

=== Bottom half ===
First round
8	(Romania) I-C Begu	6^{6}	6	7^{7}
(Andorra) V Jiménez Kasintseva	7^{8}	1	6^{3}
Q	(Austria) J Grabher	6	3	6
(Latvia) D Semeņistaja	4	6	1
WC	(Italy) C Rosatello	6	6
Q	(Italy) N Fossa Huergo	2	0
(Hungary) A Bondár	6	6
3	(United States) A Parks	2	4
7	(Turkey) Z Sönmez	6^{5}	3
(Switzerland) J Teichmann	7^{7}	6
(Canada) V Mboko	5	6	6
(Spain) N Párrizas Díaz	7	4	3
(Hungary) P Udvardy	4	6	3
(United States) V Lepchenko	6	3	6
(China) S Zhang	4	3
2/WC	(China) Xin Wang	6	6

Second round
8	(Romania) I-C Begu	1	6	6
Q	(Austria) J Grabher	6	1	2
WC	(Italy) C Rosatello	1	3
(Hungary) A Bondár	6	6
(Switzerland) J Teichmann	7^{7}	3	2
(Canada) V Mboko	6^{3}	6	6
(United States) V Lepchenko	6	3	4
2/WC	(China) Xin Wang	3	6	6

Quarterfinals
8	(Romania) I-C Begu	3	6	7^{7}
(Hungary) A Bondár	6	3	6^{5}
(Canada) V Mboko	6	6
2/WC	(China) Xin Wang	4	0

Semifinals
8	(Romania) I-C Begu	1	3
(Canada) V Mboko	6	6

== Qualifying ==
=== Seeds ===
1. (Austria) Julia Grabher (qualified)
2. (Switzerland) Susan Bandecchi (qualifying competition)
3. (Romania) Patricia Maria Țig (qualified)
4. (Spain) Marina Bassols Ribera (qualifying competition)

=== Qualifiers ===
1. (Austria) Julia Grabher
2. (Germany) Anna-Lena Friedsam
3. (Romania) Patricia Maria Țig
4. (Italy) Nicole Fossa Huergo

=== Qualifying draw ===
==== First qualifier ====
Qualifying competition
1	(Austria) Julia Grabher	6	6
WC	(Italy) Anastasia Abbagnato	4	4

==== Second qualifier ====
Qualifying competition
2	(Switzerland) Susan Bandecchi	6	3	4
	(Germany) Anna-Lena Friedsam	3	6	6

==== Third qualifier ====
Qualifying competition
3	(Romania) Patricia Maria Țig	6	7
WC	(Italy) Arianna Zucchini	2	5

==== Fourth qualifier ====
Qualifying competition
4	(Spain) Marina Bassols Ribera	6^{1}	4
	(Italy) Nicole Fossa Huergo	7^{7}	6
