= 2022 Emilia-Romagna Open – Men's doubles =

Men's doubles
- 2022 Emilia-Romagna Open

Final
- Champions: (Italy) Luciano Darderi (Brazil) Fernando Romboli
- Runners-up: (Ukraine) Denys Molchanov (Slovakia) Igor Zelenay
- Score: 6–2, 6–3

Events
Singles	men	women
Doubles	men	women
← 2021 ·	Emilia-Romagna Open	· 2023 →

Simone Bolelli and Máximo González were the defending champions but chose not to defend their title.

Luciano Darderi and Fernando Romboli won the title after defeating Denys Molchanov and Igor Zelenay 6–2, 6–3 in the final.

== Seeds ==
1. (Czech Republic) Roman Jebavý / (United States) Hunter Reese (semifinals)
2. (Colombia) Nicolás Barrientos / (Mexico) Miguel Ángel Reyes-Varela (quarterfinals)
3. (United States) Nathaniel Lammons / (United States) Jackson Withrow (first round)
4. (France) Sadio Doumbia / (France) Fabien Reboul (first round)

== Draw ==
=== Key ===
- Q = Qualifier
- WC = Wild card
- LL = Lucky loser
- Alt = Alternate
- ITF = ITF entry
- PR = Protected ranking
- SR = Special ranking
- SE = Special exempt
- JE = Junior exempt
- JR = Junior Accelerator Programme entrant
- CO = College Accelerator Programme entrant
- NG = Next Gen Accelerator Program entrant
- w/o = Walkover
- r = Retired
- d = Defaulted

First round
1	(Czech Republic) R Jebavý (United States) H Reese	6	3	[10]
(Poland) K Drzewiecki (United States) E King	4	6	[2]
Alt	(Portugal) G Elias (Belgium) M Geerts	6	6^{2}	[10]
Alt	(Italy) F Agamenone (Italy) F Cobolli	4	7^{7}	[5]
3	(United States) N Lammons (United States) J Withrow	6^{5}	5
(Italy) L Darderi (Brazil) F Romboli	7^{7}	7
(Philippines) T Huey (Croatia) F Škugor	6	6
(Serbia) I Sabanov (Serbia) M Sabanov	4	4
(Netherlands) S Arends (Netherlands) D Pel	5	6	[8]
WC	(Italy) M Bortolotti (Spain) S Martos Gornés	7	2	[10]
(Ukraine) D Molchanov (Slovakia) I Zelenay	6	3	[11]
4	(France) S Doumbia (France) F Reboul	4	6	[9]
(Ecuador) D Hidalgo (Colombia) C Rodríguez	6	6
(Slovakia) A Martin (Austria) T-S Weissborn	4	3
(United States) R Galloway (United States) A Lawson	6	0	[13]
2	(Colombia) N Barrientos (Mexico) MÁ Reyes-Varela	4	6	[15]

Quarterfinals
1	(Czech Republic) R Jebavý (United States) H Reese	7	6
Alt	(Portugal) G Elias (Belgium) M Geerts	5	2
(Italy) L Darderi (Brazil) F Romboli	5	6	[10]
(Philippines) T Huey (Croatia) F Škugor	7	3	[7]
WC	(Italy) M Bortolotti (Spain) S Martos Gornés	5	4
(Ukraine) D Molchanov (Slovakia) I Zelenay	7	6
(Ecuador) D Hidalgo (Colombia) C Rodríguez	3	7	[10]
2	(Colombia) N Barrientos (Mexico) MÁ Reyes-Varela	6	5	[8]

Semifinals
1	(Czech Republic) R Jebavý (United States) H Reese	5	6	[8]
(Italy) L Darderi (Brazil) F Romboli	7	4	[10]
(Ukraine) D Molchanov (Slovakia) I Zelenay	6	3	[10]
(Ecuador) D Hidalgo (Colombia) C Rodríguez	2	6	[7]

Final
(Italy) L Darderi (Brazil) F Romboli	6	6
(Ukraine) D Molchanov (Slovakia) I Zelenay	2	3
