= 2025 Emilia-Romagna Open – Men's doubles =

Men's doubles
- 2025 Emilia-Romagna Open

Final
- Champions: (Australia) Matthew Romios (United States) Ryan Seggerman
- Runners-up: (Austria) Alexander Erler (Germany) Constantin Frantzen
- Score: 7–6^{(7–4)}, 3–6, [10–7]

Events
Singles	men	women
Doubles	men	women
- Emilia-Romagna Open

Marco Bortolotti and Matthew Romios were the defending champions but chose to defend their title with different partners. Bortolotti partnered Cristian Rodríguez but lost in the first round to Romain Arneodo and Manuel Guinard. Romios partnered Ryan Seggerman and successfully defended his title after defeating Alexander Erler and Constantin Frantzen 7–6^{(7–4)}, 3–6, [10–7] in the final.

== Seeds ==
1. (Austria) Alexander Erler / (Germany) Constantin Frantzen (final)
2. (Monaco) Romain Arneodo / (France) Manuel Guinard (quarterfinals)
3. (Netherlands) Robin Haase / (Netherlands) Bart Stevens (first round)
4. (Australia) Matthew Romios / (United States) Ryan Seggerman (champions)

== Draw ==
Key

- Q = Qualifier
- WC = Wild card
- LL = Lucky loser
- Alt = Alternate
- ITF = ITF entry
- PR = Protected ranking
- SR = Special ranking
- SE = Special exempt
- JE = Junior exempt
- JR = Junior Accelerator Programme entrant
- CO = College Accelerator Programme entrant
- NG = Next Gen Accelerator Program entrant
- w/o = Walkover
- r = Retired
- d = Defaulted

=== Draw ===
First round
1	(Austria) A Erler (Germany) C Frantzen	6	3	[10]
(Chinese Taipei) R Ho (Spain) D Vega Hernández	3	6	[7]
(United States) T Hilderbrand (United States) M Kiger	4	2
(Ecuador) G Escobar (Ukraine) D Molchanov	6	6
3	(Netherlands) R Haase (Netherlands) B Stevens	4	6	[7]
(United States) G Goldhoff (France) G Jacq	6	3	[10]
Alt	(France) G Blancaneaux (Belgium) M Geerts	4	6	[3]
WC	(Italy) F Bondioli (Italy) S Travaglia	6	4	[10]
(Argentina) S Rodríguez Taverna (Japan) K Uchida	3	4
(Czech Republic) Jiří Barnat (Czech Republic) F Duda	6	6
WC	(Italy) Federico Iannaccone (Italy) Alexander Weis	3	7^{7}	[6]
4	(Australia) MC Romios (United States) R Seggerman	6	6^{1}	[10]
I Liutarevich (Netherlands) M Veldheer	5	2
(Spain) Í Cervantes (Argentina) G Durán	7	6
(Italy) M Bortolotti (Colombia) C Rodríguez	4	2
2	(Monaco) R Arneodo (France) M Guinard	6	6

Quarterfinals
1	(Austria) A Erler (Germany) C Frantzen	6	6
(Ecuador) G Escobar (Ukraine) D Molchanov	3	3
(United States) G Goldhoff (France) G Jacq	5	6	[10]
WC	(Italy) F Bondioli (Italy) S Travaglia	7	2	[5]
(Czech Republic) J Barnat (Czech Republic) F Duda	5	7^{7}	[9]
4	(Australia) MC Romios (United States) R Seggerman	7	6^{3}	[11]
(Spain) Í Cervantes (Argentina) G Durán	7^{7}	4	[11]
2	(Monaco) R Arneodo (France) M Guinard	6^{5}	6	[9]

Semifinals
1	(Austria) A Erler (Germany) C Frantzen	6	6
(United States) G Goldhoff (France) G Jacq	4	4
4	(Australia) MC Romios (United States) R Seggerman	6	2	[10]
(Spain) Í Cervantes (Argentina) G Durán	3	6	[5]

Final
1	(Austria) A Erler (Germany) C Frantzen	6^{4}	6	[7]
4	(Australia) MC Romios (United States) R Seggerman	7^{7}	3	[10]
