= 2023 Emilia-Romagna Open – Doubles =

Doubles
- 2023 Emilia-Romagna Open

Final
- Champions: (France) Jonathan Eysseric (Mexico) Miguel Ángel Reyes-Varela
- Runners-up: (Switzerland) Luca Margaroli (India) Ramkumar Ramanathan
- Score: 6–2, 6–3

Events
Singles	men	women
Doubles	men	women
← 2022 ·	Emilia-Romagna Open	· 2024 →

Luciano Darderi and Fernando Romboli were the defending champions but chose to defend their title with different partners. Darderi partnered Andrea Collarini but lost in the first round to Marco Bortolotti and Sergio Martos Gornés. Romboli partnered Marcelo Zormann but lost in the first round to Boris Arias and Federico Zeballos.

Jonathan Eysseric and Miguel Ángel Reyes-Varela won the title after defeating Luca Margaroli and Ramkumar Ramanathan 6–2, 6–3 in the final.

== Seeds ==
1. (Serbia) Nikola Ćaćić / (Romania) Victor Vlad Cornea (semifinals)
2. (France) Jonathan Eysseric / (Mexico) Miguel Ángel Reyes-Varela (champions)
3. (Italy) Marco Bortolotti / (Spain) Sergio Martos Gornés (quarterfinals)
4. (Venezuela) Luis David Martínez / (Italy) Andrea Pellegrino (first round)

== Draw ==
=== Key ===
- Q = Qualifier
- WC = Wild card
- LL = Lucky loser
- Alt = Alternate
- ITF = ITF entry
- PR = Protected ranking
- SR = Special ranking
- SE = Special exempt
- JE = Junior exempt
- JR = Junior Accelerator Programme entrant
- CO = College Accelerator Programme entrant
- NG = Next Gen Accelerator Program entrant
- w/o = Walkover
- r = Retired
- d = Defaulted

First round
1	(Serbia) N Ćaćić (Romania) VV Cornea	6	6
WC	(Italy) S Caruso (Italy) F Gaio	1	4
(France) A Müller (Kazakhstan) D Popko	6	6
(Italy) R Bonadio (Italy) G Fonio	4	4
4	(Venezuela) LD Martínez (Italy) A Pellegrino	2	6	[1]
(Switzerland) L Margaroli (India) R Ramanathan	6	3	[10]
(Italy) A Giannessi (Brazil) T Monteiro	6	6
WC	(Italy) F Bondioli (Italy) F Forti	4	4
(Spain) Í Cervantes (Spain) O Roca Batalla	6	7^{7}
(Italy) F Passaro (Italy) S Travaglia	2	6^{2}
(Argentina) A Collarini (Italy) L Darderi	2	3
3	(Italy) M Bortolotti (Spain) S Martos Gornés	6	6
(Brazil) F Romboli (Brazil) M Zormann	3	6	[6]
(Bolivia) B Arias (Bolivia) F Zeballos	6	1	[10]
(United States) A Lawson (Greece) M Pervolarakis	4	6	[6]
2	(France) J Eysseric (Mexico) MÁ Reyes-Varela	6	2	[10]

Quarterfinals
1	(Serbia) N Ćaćić (Romania) VV Cornea	7	7
(France) A Müller (Kazakhstan) D Popko	5	5
(Switzerland) L Margaroli (India) R Ramanathan	w/o
(Italy) A Giannessi (Brazil) T Monteiro
(Spain) Í Cervantes (Spain) O Roca Batalla	7^{7}	7
3	(Italy) M Bortolotti (Spain) S Martos Gornés	6^{5}	5
(Bolivia) B Arias (Bolivia) F Zeballos	3	4
2	(France) J Eysseric (Mexico) MÁ Reyes-Varela	6	6

Semifinals
1	(Serbia) N Ćaćić (Romania) VV Cornea	6	4	[13]
(Switzerland) L Margaroli (India) R Ramanathan	1	6	[15]
(Spain) Í Cervantes (Spain) O Roca Batalla	6^{4}	3
2	(France) J Eysseric (Mexico) MÁ Reyes-Varela	7^{7}	6

Final
(Switzerland) L Margaroli (India) R Ramanathan	2	3
2	(France) J Eysseric (Mexico) MÁ Reyes-Varela	6	6
