= 2022 Emilia-Romagna Open – Women's singles =

Women's singles
- 2022 Emilia-Romagna Open

Final
- Champion: (Egypt) Mayar Sherif
- Runner-up: (Greece) Maria Sakkari
- Score: 7–5, 6–3

Details
- Draw: 32
- Seeds: 8

Events
Singles	men	women
Doubles	men	women
← 2021 ·	Emilia-Romagna Open	· 2023 →

Mayar Sherif defeated Maria Sakkari in the final, 7–5, 6–3 to win the women's singles tennis title at the 2022 Emilia-Romagna Open. It was her maiden WTA Tour title, and Sherif became the first Egyptian to win a WTA Tour singles title.

Coco Gauff was the reigning champion, but did not participate.

== Seeds ==
1. (Greece) Maria Sakkari (final)
2. (Italy) Martina Trevisan (first round)
3. (Romania) Irina-Camelia Begu (quarterfinals)
4. (United States) Sloane Stephens (second round)
5. (Hungary) Anna Bondár (first round)
6. (Romania) Ana Bogdan (semifinals)
7. (Spain) Nuria Párrizas Díaz (first round)
8. (Italy) Lucia Bronzetti (first round)

== Draw ==
=== Key ===
- Q = Qualifier
- WC = Wild card
- LL = Lucky loser
- Alt = Alternate
- ITF = ITF entry
- PR = Protected ranking
- SR = Special ranking
- SE = Special exempt
- JE = Junior exempt
- JR = Junior Accelerator Programme entrant
- CO = College Accelerator Programme entrant
- NG = Next Gen Accelerator Program entrant
- w/o = Walkover
- r = Retired
- d = Defaulted

=== Finals ===
Semifinals
1/WC	(Greece) Maria Sakkari	7	6
(Montenegro) Danka Kovinić	5	2
6	(Romania) Ana Bogdan	4	6	4
(Egypt) Mayar Sherif	6	3	6

Final
1/WC	(Greece) Maria Sakkari	5	3
(Egypt) Mayar Sherif	7	6

=== Top half ===
First round
1/WC	(Greece) M Sakkari	6^{2}	6	6
Q	(Ukraine) K Baindl	7^{7}	2	3
(Netherlands) A Rus	7	6
(Hungary) P Udvardy	5	3
(Hungary) D Gálfi	6	6
Q	E Andreeva	1	2
(Belgium) M Zanevska	6	6
8	(Italy) L Bronzetti	3	2
4	(United States) S Stephens	3	6	6
(Poland) M Fręch	6	3	4
(Montenegro) D Kovinić	6	3	6
(France) O Dodin	1	6	4
(Italy) J Paolini	5	6	6
Q	(Germany) J Niemeier	7	4	2
(Italy) E Cocciaretto	7	6
7	(Spain) N Párrizas Díaz	5	1

Second round
1/WC	(Greece) M Sakkari	3	6	6
(Netherlands) A Rus	6	2	3
(Hungary) D Gálfi	1	3
(Belgium) M Zanevska	6	6
4	(United States) S Stephens	5	6	5
(Montenegro) D Kovinić	7	2	7
(Italy) J Paolini	4	6	6
(Italy) E Cocciaretto	6	3	4

Quarterfinals
1/WC	(Greece) M Sakkari	2	6	6
(Belgium) M Zanevska	6	4	4
(Montenegro) D Kovinić	6	6
(Italy) J Paolini	4	4

Semifinals
1/WC	(Greece) M Sakkari	7	6
(Montenegro) D Kovinić	5	2

=== Bottom half ===
First round
6	(Romania) A Bogdan	6	6
(Brazil) L Pigossi	1	2
Q	(Hungary) RL Jani	2	4
Q	(Slovakia) AK Schmiedlová	6	6
WC	(Italy) M Paoletti	6	3	6
LL	(Romania) G Lee	4	6	0
(Bulgaria) V Tomova	5	1^{r}
3	(Romania) I-C Begu	7	5
5	(Hungary) A Bondár	5	4
(Egypt) M Sherif	7	6
Q	(Switzerland) S Waltert	6	6
(Slovenia) T Zidanšek	4	4
WC	(Italy) S Errani	5	5
(United States) L Davis	7	7
(Spain) S Sorribes Tormo	7	6
2	(Italy) M Trevisan	5	0

Second round
6	(Romania) A Bogdan	6	3	6
Q	(Slovakia) AK Schmiedlová	2	6	3
WC	(Italy) M Paoletti	4	4
3	(Romania) I-C Begu	6	6
(Egypt) M Sherif	6	7^{7}
Q	(Switzerland) S Waltert	3	6^{1}
(United States) L Davis	3	6	7
(Spain) S Sorribes Tormo	6	4	5

Quarterfinals
6	(Romania) A Bogdan	6	7^{8}
3	(Romania) I-C Begu	2	6^{6}
(Egypt) M Sherif	7^{7}	6
(United States) L Davis	6^{2}	3

Semifinals
6	(Romania) A Bogdan	4	6	4
(Egypt) M Sherif	6	3	6

== Qualifying ==
=== Seeds ===
1. (Germany) Jule Niemeier (qualified)
2. (Hungary) Réka Luca Jani (qualified)
3. (Switzerland) Simona Waltert (qualified)
4. (Slovakia) Anna Karolína Schmiedlová (qualified)
5. (Ukraine) Kateryna Baindl (qualified)
6. Erika Andreeva (qualified)
7. (Romania) Gabriela Lee (qualifying competition, lucky loser)
8. (Romania) Irina Bara (qualifying competition)
9. Oksana Selekhmeteva (qualifying competition)
10. (United States) Alycia Parks (qualifying competition)
11. Anastasia Zakharova (first round)
12. (Argentina) María Lourdes Carlé (qualifying competition)

=== Qualifiers ===
1. (Germany) Jule Niemeier
2. (Hungary) Réka Luca Jani
3. (Switzerland) Simona Waltert
4. (Slovakia) Anna Karolína Schmiedlová
5. (Ukraine) Kateryna Baindl
6. Erika Andreeva

=== Lucky loser ===
1. (Romania) Gabriela Lee

=== Qualifying draw ===
==== First qualifier ====
First round
1	(Germany) Jule Niemeier	6	6
WC	(Italy) Francesca Pace	2	1
(Brazil) Carolina Alves	6	2	6^{6}
9	Oksana Selekhmeteva	4	6	7^{8}

Qualifying competition
1	(Germany) Jule Niemeier	6	6
9	Oksana Selekhmeteva	3	3

==== Second qualifier ====
First round
2	(Hungary) Réka Luca Jani	6	7^{7}
(Croatia) Tara Würth	0	6^{2}
WC	(Italy) Nuria Brancaccio	2	7^{8}	1
7	(Romania) Gabriela Lee	6	6^{6}	6

Qualifying competition
2	(Hungary) Réka Luca Jani	5	6	6
7	(Romania) Gabriela Lee	7	3	0

==== Third qualifier ====
First round
3	(Switzerland) Simona Waltert	6	6
WC	(Italy) Melania Delai	4	4
WC	(Italy) Federica Urgesi	4	4
12	(Argentina) María Lourdes Carlé	6	6

Qualifying competition
3	(Switzerland) Simona Waltert	6	2	6
12	(Argentina) María Lourdes Carlé	3	6	4

==== Fourth qualifier ====
First round
4	(Slovakia) Anna Karolína Schmiedlová	7	6
(Italy) Jessica Pieri	5	4
(Latvia) Diāna Marcinkēviča	3	2
10	(United States) Alycia Parks	6	6

Qualifying competition
4	(Slovakia) Anna Karolína Schmiedlová	6	6
10	(United States) Alycia Parks	2	2

==== Fifth qualifier ====
First round
5	(Ukraine) Kateryna Baindl	5	6	6
(France) Elsa Jacquemot	7	3	4
(Germany) Lena Papadakis	2	3
8	(Romania) Irina Bara	6	6

Qualifying competition
5	(Ukraine) Kateryna Baindl	6	6
8	(Romania) Irina Bara	0	3

==== Sixth qualifier ====
First round
6	Erika Andreeva	6	6
(Italy) Federica Di Sarra	1	1
(Spain) Rebeka Masarova	6	6
11	Anastasia Zakharova	1	2

Qualifying competition
6	Erika Andreeva	6	6
(Spain) Rebeka Masarova	2	2
