= Francesca Pace =

Italian tennis player

- Country (sports): Italy
- Residence: Rome, Italy
- Born: 5 August 2005 (age 21)
- Plays: Right-handed
- Coach: Massimiliano Pace
- Prize money: $64,713

Singles
- Career record: 94–80
- Career titles: 3 ITF
- Highest ranking: No. 288 (21 September 2026)
- Current ranking: No. 293 (28 September 2026)

Grand Slam singles results
- Australian Open Junior: 1R (2023)
- French Open Junior: 2R (2023)
- Wimbledon Junior: 3R (2023)
- US Open Junior: 1R (2023)

Doubles
- Career record: 73–48
- Career titles: 6 ITF
- Highest ranking: No. 272 (14 September 2026)
- Current ranking: No. 278 (28 September 2026)

Grand Slam doubles results
- Australian Open Junior: 2R (2023)
- French Open Junior: 2R (2023)
- Wimbledon Junior: 1R (2023)
- US Open Junior: 1R (2023)
- Last updated on: 30 September 2026.

Francesca Pace (born 5 August 2005) is an Italian tennis player. She made her debut at a WTA 250 tournament when she played in the women's doubles at the 2022 Emilia-Romagna Open.

== Personal life ==
The daughter of former tennis professional Irina Spîrlea, Pace was brought up in Rome. She has been coached from an early age by her father Massimiliano Pace. He also acted as coach for her mother during her tennis career. She has a brother named Tommaso.

== Career ==
=== 2021 ===
In May 2021, Pace won an ITF junior tournament in Limassol. That year, she also claimed her first victories in women’s tennis, winning her debut match in a 15k event in Cairo, 6–1, 6–1 against Wan Chao-yi.

=== 2022 ===
Pace played in September the women's doubles at the 2022 Emilia-Romagna Open, a WTA 250 tournament in Parma. She played with Federica Urgesi, and they lost in the first round to compatriots Martina Trevisan and Jasmine Paolini.

=== 2023 ===
Pace came through qualifying to play in the girls’ singles competition at the 2023 Australian Open.

== ITF Circuit finals ==
=== Singles: 6 (3 titles, 3 runner-ups) ===
Legend W50 tournaments (0–1) W35 tournaments (3–1) W15 tournaments (0–1)	Finals by surface Hard (2–1) Clay (1–2)

Result	W–L	Date	Tournament	Tier	Surface	Opponent	Score
Loss	0–1	May 2025	ITF Orlando, US	W15	Clay	(Japan) Mayu Crossley	1–6, 6–2, 4–6
Win	1–1	Oct 2025	ITF Redding, US	W35	Hard	(United States) Lea Ma	1–6, 6–2, 6–4
Win	2–1	Oct 2025	ITF Norman, US	W35	Hard	Ekaterina Khayrutdinova	6–3, 7–6^{(5)}
Win	3–1	Nov 2025	ITF Boca Raton, US	W35	Clay	(United States) Akasha Urhobo	4–6, 6–4, 6–4
Loss	3–2	Aug 2026	ITF Oldenzaal, Netherlands	W50	Clay	(Germany) Nastasja Schunk	5–7, 4–6
Loss	3–3	Oct 2026	ITF Las Vegas, US	W35	Hard	(Denmark) Emma Kamper	5–7, 2–6

=== Doubles: 15 (7 titles, 8 runner-ups) ===
Legend W35 tournaments (5–5) W15 tournaments (2–3)	Finals by surface Hard (2–2) Clay (5–6)

Result	W–L	Date	Tournament	Tier	Surface	Partner	Opponents	Score
Win	1–0	Nov 2023	ITF Antalya, Turkey	W15	Clay	(Morocco) Aya El Aouni	(Japan) Mayuka Aikawa (Japan) Haine Ogata	6–0, 6–4
Loss	1–1	May 2024	ITF Antalya, Turkey	W15	Clay	(Morocco) Aya El Aouni	(Bulgaria) Dia Evtimova (Italy) Verena Meliss	4–6, 6–7^{(2)}
Win	2–1	Jun 2024	ITF Madrid, Spain	W15	Clay	(Colombia) María Herazo González	(Italy) Diletta Cherubini (Germany) Carolina Kuhl	6–3, 7–5
Loss	2–2	Jul 2024	ITF Viserba, Italy	W15	Clay	(Algeria) Inès Ibbou	(Italy) Anastasia Bertacchi (Austria) Lilli Tagger	0–6, 6–2, [5–10]
Loss	2–3	Oct 2024	ITF Bol, Croatia	W15	Clay	(Germany) Laura Boehner	(Slovakia) Laura Svatíková (Romania) Arina Gabriela Vasilescu	0–6, 6–7^{(3)}
Loss	2–4	May 2025	ITF Santo Domingo, Dominican Republic	W35	Clay	(Poland) Zuzanna Pawlikowska	(Italy) Miriana Tona (Bolivia) Noelia Zeballos	0–6, 3–6
Loss	2–5	May 2025	ITF Santo Domingo, Dominican Republic	W35	Clay	(Poland) Zuzanna Pawlikowska	(Italy) Miriana Tona (Bolivia) Noelia Zeballos	4–6, 3–6
Loss	2–6	Jun 2025	Roma Cup, Italy	W35	Clay	(Italy) Sofia Rocchetti	(Italy) Noemi Basiletti (Italy) Giorgia Pedone	3–6, 1–6
Loss	2–7	Sep 2025	Berkley Challenge, US	W35	Hard	(Poland) Zuzanna Pawlikowska	(United States) Rasheeda McAdoo (Kenya) Angella Okutoyi	6–7^{(2)}, 4–6
Win	3–7	Sep 2025	ITF San Rafael, US	W35	Hard	(Poland) Zuzanna Pawlikowska	(Slovenia) Živa Falkner (Luxembourg) Marie Weckerle	4–6, 6–3, [10–5]
Loss	3–8	Oct 2025	ITF Bakersfield, US	W35	Hard	(Poland) Zuzanna Pawlikowska	(Bosnia and Herzegovina) Ema Burgić (Ukraine) Anita Sahdiieva	7–5, 1–6, [7–10]
Win	4–8	Nov 2025	ITF Orlando, US	W35	Clay	(Kenya) Angella Okutoyi	(United States) Allura Zamarripa (United States) Maribella Zamarripa	3–6, 6–4, [14–12]
Win	5–8	Jan 2026	ITF Antalya, Turkey	W35	Clay	(Croatia) Lucija Ćirić Bagarić	Daria Lodikova; Alexandra Shubladze	4–6, 6–3, [12–10]
Win	6–8	Aug 2026	ITF Kraków, Poland	W35	Clay	(Italy) Gaia Maduzzi	(Poland) Daria Górska (Poland) Amelia Paszun	7–6^{(3)}, 6–4
Win	7–8	Oct 2026	ITF Las Vegas, US	W35	Hard	(Italy) Diletta Cherubini	(United States) Abigail Rencheli; Maria Sholokhova	7–6^{(7–5)}, 7–5
