= 2024 Emilia-Romagna Open – Men's singles =

Men's singles
- 2024 Emilia-Romagna Open

Final
- Champion: (Netherlands) Jesper de Jong
- Runner-up: (Germany) Daniel Altmaier
- Score: 7–6^{(7–5)}, 6–1

Events
Singles	men	women
Doubles	men	women
- Emilia-Romagna Open

Alexandre Müller was the defending champion but lost in the first round to Jesper de Jong.

De Jong won the title after defeating Daniel Altmaier 7–6^{(7–5)}, 6–1 in the final.

== Seeds ==
1. (Argentina) Federico Coria (semifinals)
2. (France) Alexandre Müller (first round)
3. (Croatia) Borna Ćorić (first round)
4. (Germany) Daniel Altmaier (final)
5. (Italy) Fabio Fognini (second round)
6. (France) Luca Van Assche (second round)
7. (Argentina) Francisco Comesaña (first round)
8. (Argentina) Thiago Agustín Tirante (second round)

== Draw ==
Key

- Q = Qualifier
- WC = Wild card
- LL = Lucky loser
- Alt = Alternate
- ITF = ITF entry
- PR = Protected ranking
- SR = Special ranking
- SE = Special exempt
- JE = Junior exempt
- JR = Junior Accelerator Programme entrant
- CO = College Accelerator Programme entrant
- NG = Next Gen Accelerator Program entrant
- w/o = Walkover
- r = Retired
- d = Defaulted

=== Finals ===
Semifinals
1	(Argentina) Federico Coria	7^{9}	4	6^{3}
4	(Germany) Daniel Altmaier	6^{7}	6	7^{7}
Q	(Slovakia) Martin Kližan	6	1	0
(Netherlands) Jesper de Jong	4	6	6

Final
4	(Germany) Daniel Altmaier	6^{5}	1
(Netherlands) Jesper de Jong	7^{7}	6

=== Top half ===
First round
1	(Argentina) F Coria	6	6
(Italy) F Maestrelli	1	3
(Spain) B Zapata Miralles	6^{6}	0^{r}
WC	(Italy) F Arnaboldi	7^{8}	0
(South Korea) G Campaña Lee	6	6
Alt	E Gerasimov	3	2
Q	(Italy) M Cecchinato	7^{7}	6
7	(Argentina) F Comesaña	6^{4}	2
4	(Germany) D Altmaier	6	6
(Sweden) E Ymer	1	0
(Italy) S Travaglia	6	6
Q	(Argentina) G Andreozzi	2	4
(Peru) JP Varillas	6	4	4
Q	(Italy) R Bonadio	2	6	6
(France) M Janvier	2	2
5/WC	(Italy) F Fognini	6	6

Second round
1	(Argentina) F Coria	6	5	6
WC	(Italy) F Arnaboldi	4	7	0
(South Korea) G Campaña Lee	3	2
Q	(Italy) M Cecchinato	6	6
4	(Germany) D Altmaier	6	2	6
(Italy) S Travaglia	3	6	4
Q	(Italy) R Bonadio	6	6
5/WC	(Italy) F Fognini	4	3

Quarterfinals
1	(Argentina) F Coria	6	7^{7}
Q	(Italy) M Cecchinato	2	6^{1}
4	(Germany) D Altmaier	6^{4}	6	7
Q	(Italy) R Bonadio	7^{7}	2	5

Semifinals
1	(Argentina) F Coria	7^{9}	4	6^{3}
4	(Germany) D Altmaier	6^{7}	6	7^{7}

=== Bottom half ===
First round
6	(France) L Van Assche	1	6	6
(Argentina) RA Burruchaga	6	4	4
(Italy) A Pellegrino	3	2
(United States) T Boyer	6	6
Q	(Slovakia) M Kližan	3
(Italy) G Zeppieri	3^{r}
Alt	(Argentina) JP Ficovich	6	6^{5}	6
3	(Croatia) B Ćorić	4	7^{7}	4
8	(Argentina) TA Tirante	7^{7}	7
WC	(Italy) F Cinà	6^{5}	5
Q	(Italy) Alexander Weis	3	6	7^{7}
Q	(France) V Royer	6	1	6^{5}
Alt	(Czech Republic) J Veselý	6^{3}	1
(Peru) I Buse	7^{7}	6
(Netherlands) J de Jong	6	6
2	(France) A Müller	2	3

Second round
6	(France) L Van Assche	2	5
(United States) T Boyer	6	7
Q	(Slovakia) M Kližan	6	6
Alt	(Argentina) JP Ficovich	2	2
8	(Argentina) TA Tirante	4	6	3
Q	(Italy) A Weis	6	2	6
(Peru) I Buse	6^{1}	4
(Netherlands) J de Jong	7^{7}	6

Quarterfinals
(United States) T Boyer	5	5
Q	(Slovakia) M Kližan	7	7
Q	(Italy) A Weis	7	3	3
(Netherlands) J de Jong	5	6	6

Semifinals
Q	(Slovakia) M Kližan	6	1	0
(Netherlands) J de Jong	4	6	6
