= 2023 Emilia-Romagna Open – Singles =

Singles
- 2023 Emilia-Romagna Open

Final
- Champion: (France) Alexandre Müller
- Runner-up: (Italy) Francesco Maestrelli
- Score: 6–1, 6–4

Events
Singles	men	women
Doubles	men	women
- Emilia-Romagna Open

Borna Ćorić was the defending champion but chose not to defend his title.

Alexandre Müller won the title after defeating Francesco Maestrelli 6–1, 6–4 in the final.

== Seeds ==
1. (Spain) Albert Ramos Viñolas (quarterfinals)
2. (Brazil) Thiago Monteiro (quarterfinals)
3. (France) Alexandre Müller (champion)
4. (Spain) Jaume Munar (first round)
5. (Hungary) Fábián Marozsán (withdrew)
6. (Italy) Giulio Zeppieri (semifinals)
7. (Italy) Francesco Passaro (first round)
8. (Slovakia) Jozef Kovalík (first round)

== Draw ==
Key

- Q = Qualifier
- WC = Wild card
- LL = Lucky loser
- Alt = Alternate
- ITF = ITF entry
- PR = Protected ranking
- SR = Special ranking
- SE = Special exempt
- JE = Junior exempt
- JR = Junior Accelerator Programme entrant
- CO = College Accelerator Programme entrant
- NG = Next Gen Accelerator Program entrant
- w/o = Walkover
- r = Retired
- d = Defaulted

=== Finals ===
Semifinals
6	(Italy) Giulio Zeppieri	4	7^{7}	6^{2}
(Italy) Francesco Maestrelli	6	6^{4}	7^{7}
3	(France) Alexandre Müller	4	6	6
(Italy) Stefano Travaglia	6	3	4

Final
(Italy) Francesco Maestrelli	1	4
3	(France) Alexandre Müller	6	6

=== Top half ===
First round
1	(Spain) A Ramos Viñolas	6	6
Alt	(Spain) F Verdasco	2	3
(Italy) G Fonio	6	6
Q	(Italy) F Moroni	3	2
(Italy) R Bonadio	7^{7}	6
(Italy) L Darderi	6^{3}	4
Q	B Bobrov	4	3
6	(Italy) G Zeppieri	6	6
4	(Spain) J Munar	5	3
(Italy) F Maestrelli	7	6
Q	(Italy) S Napolitano	4	6	6
WC	(Uruguay) P Cuevas	6	3	1
(Argentina) A Collarini	6	6
Q	(Kazakhstan) D Popko	4	3
(Italy) S Caruso	6	4	7
7	(Italy) F Passaro	4	6	5

Second round
1	(Spain) A Ramos Viñolas	6	3	6
(Italy) G Fonio	1	6	3
(Italy) R Bonadio	2	5
6	(Italy) G Zeppieri	6	7
(Italy) F Maestrelli	7^{7}	6
Q	(Italy) S Napolitano	6^{3}	3
(Argentina) A Collarini	7	6
(Italy) S Caruso	5	4

Quarterfinals
1	(Spain) A Ramos Viñolas	5	3
6	(Italy) G Zeppieri	7	6
(Italy) F Maestrelli	6	6
(Argentina) A Collarini	4	0

Semifinals
6	(Italy) G Zeppieri	4	7^{7}	6^{2}
(Italy) F Maestrelli	6	6^{4}	7^{7}

=== Bottom half ===
First round
LL	(France) M Janvier	4	6	1
(Italy) A Giannessi	6	4	6
(Bulgaria) A Andreev	1	4
Alt	(Spain) O Roca Batalla	6	6
(Italy) F Gaio	7^{7}	7^{7}
WC	(Italy) F Forti	6^{4}	6^{2}
Q	(Spain) Àlex Martí Pujolràs	4	3
3	(France) A Müller	6	6
8	(Slovakia) J Kovalík	4	6^{5}
(Italy) M Gigante	6	7^{7}
Alt	(Italy) Edoardo Lavagno	2	0^{r}
(Italy) S Travaglia	6	0
Q	(Slovenia) B Rola	6	1	6
WC	(Italy) Alexander Weis	3	6	3
(Italy) A Pellegrino	4	4
2	(Brazil) T Monteiro	6	6

Second round
(Italy) A Giannessi	6	6
Alt	(Spain) O Roca Batalla	4	2
(Italy) F Gaio	5	2
3	(France) A Müller	7	6
(Italy) M Gigante	4	6^{2}
(Italy) S Travaglia	6	7^{7}
Q	(Slovenia) B Rola	4	2
2	(Brazil) T Monteiro	6	6

Quarterfinals
(Italy) A Giannessi	6	3	1
3	(France) A Müller	3	6	6
(Italy) S Travaglia	6	7^{7}
2	(Brazil) T Monteiro	3	6^{5}

Semifinals
3	(France) A Müller	4	6	6
(Italy) S Travaglia	6	3	4
