= 2024 Emilia-Romagna Open – Doubles =

Doubles
- 2024 Emilia-Romagna Open

Final
- Champions: (Kazakhstan) Anna Danilina; Irina Khromacheva
- Runners-up: (France) Elixane Lechemia (Brazil) Ingrid Martins
- Score: 6–1, 6–2

Events
Singles	men	women
Doubles	men	women
← 2023 ·	Emilia-Romagna Open	· 2025 →

Dalila Jakupović and Irina Khromacheva were the reigning champions, but Jakupović chose not to compete this year. Khromacheva partnered with Anna Danilina and successfully defended her title, defeating Elixane Lechemia and Ingrid Martins in the final, 6–1, 6–2.

== Seeds ==
1. (Kazakhstan) Anna Danilina / Irina Khromacheva (champions)
2. (France) Elixane Lechemia / (Brazil) Ingrid Martins (final)
3. (Czech Republic) Miriam Kolodziejová / (Czech Republic) Anna Sisková (semifinals, retired)
4. (United Kingdom) Alicia Barnett / (United Kingdom) Freya Christie (quarterfinals)

== Draw ==
=== Key ===
- Q = Qualifier
- WC = Wild card
- LL = Lucky loser
- Alt = Alternate
- ITF = ITF entry
- PR = Protected ranking
- SR = Special ranking
- SE = Special exempt
- JE = Junior exempt
- JR = Junior Accelerator Programme entrant
- CO = College Accelerator Programme entrant
- NG = Next Gen Accelerator Program entrant
- w/o = Walkover
- r = Retired
- d = Defaulted

=== Draw ===
First round
WC	(Italy) L Pigato (Italy) J Ruggeri
A Fomina-Klotz (Germany) J Lohoff	w/o
(Colombia) MP Pérez (India) A Raina	1	1
(Czech Republic) J Malečková (Switzerland) C Perrin	6	6

Quarterfinals
1	(Kazakhstan) A Danilina; I Khromacheva	6	6
A Fomina-Klotz (Germany) J Lohoff	0	2
3	(Czech Republic) M Kolodziejová (Czech Republic) A Sisková	w/o
(Italy) N Brancaccio (Italy) G Pedone
(Czech Republic) J Malečková (Switzerland) C Perrin	6	7
4	(United Kingdom) A Barnett (United Kingdom) F Christie	4	5
(Netherlands) I Haverlag (Mexico) R Zarazúa	3	4
2	(France) E Lechemia (Brazil) I Martins	6	6

Semifinals
1	(Kazakhstan) A Danilina; I Khromacheva	6	0
3	(Czech Republic) M Kolodziejová (Czech Republic) A Sisková	1	0^{r}
(Czech Republic) J Malečková (Switzerland) C Perrin	7^{7}	1	[8]
2	(France) E Lechemia (Brazil) I Martins	6^{5}	6	[10]

Final
1	(Kazakhstan) A Danilina; I Khromacheva	6	6
2	(France) E Lechemia (Brazil) I Martins	1	2
