= Eleonora Alvisi =

Italian tennis player (born 2003)

- Country (sports): Italy
- Born: 13 March 2003 (age 23)
- Plays: Right-handed
- Prize money: $39,141

Singles
- Career record: 93–84
- Career titles: 1 ITF
- Highest ranking: No. 663 (29 July 2024)
- Current ranking: No. 1093 (13 October 2025)

Grand Slam singles results
- French Open Junior: 1R (2021)
- Wimbledon Junior: 1R (2021)

Doubles
- Career record: 34–49
- Career titles: 1 ITF
- Highest ranking: No. 428 (27 May 2024)
- Current ranking: No. 717 (13 October 2025)

Grand Slam doubles results
- French Open Junior: W (2020)
- Wimbledon Junior: 2R (2021)
- Last updated on: 13 October 2025.

Eleonora Alvisi (born 13 March 2003) is an Italian tennis player.

She has a career-high ITF juniors ranking of 36, achieved on 4 January 2021.

Alvisi won the 2020 French Open girls' doubles event, partnering Lisa Pigato. They defeated the Russian pairing of Maria Bondarenko and Diana Shnaider in the final.

In 2023, she made her WTA Tour debut in Parma as a wildcard, losing in the first round to fourth seed Viktoriya Tomova in three sets.

== ITF Circuit finals ==
=== Singles: 1 (title) ===
| Legend W15 tournaments | Finals by surface Clay (1–0) |

| Result | W–L | Date | Tournament | Tier | Surface | Opponent | Score |
|---|---|---|---|---|---|---|---|
| Win | 1–0 | Mar 2022 | ITF Marrakech, Morocco | W15 | Clay | (United States) Clervie Ngounoue | 6–3, 6–1 |

=== Doubles: 5 (1 title, 4 runner-ups) ===
| Legend W25/35 tournaments W15 tournaments | Finals by surface Clay (1–4) |

| Result | W–L | Date | Tournament | Tier | Surface | Partner | Opponent | Score |
|---|---|---|---|---|---|---|---|---|
| Win | 1–0 | Oct 2023 | ITF Santa Margherita di Pula, Italy | W25 | Clay | (Italy) Nuria Brancaccio | (Italy) Anastasia Abbagnato (Italy) Virginia Ferrara | 6–2, 2–6, [10–6] |
| Loss | 1–1 | Apr 2024 | ITF Santa Margherita di Pula, Italy | W35 | Clay | (Italy) Federica Urgesi | (Greece) Eleni Christofi (Bulgaria) Lia Karatancheva | 0–6, 4–6 |
| Loss | 1–2 | Oct 2025 | ITF Santa Margherita di Pula, Italy | W35 | Clay | (Italy) Gaia Maduzzi | (Serbia) Anja Stanković (Bulgaria) Elizara Yaneva | 5–7, 4–6 |
| Loss | 1–3 | Jun 2026 | ITF San Gregorio, Italy | W35 | Clay | (Italy) Francesca Gandolfi | (Peru) Lucciana Pérez (Italy) Miriana Tona | 6–7^{(2)}, 6–4, [7–10] |
| Loss | 1–4 | Jul 2026 | ITF Las Palmas, Spain | W15 | Clay | (Italy) Sonia Cassani | (Spain) Olga Bienzobas Fernandez (Australia) Naomi McKenzie | 5–7, 7–5, [6–10] |

== Junior Grand Slam tournament finals ==
=== Girls' doubles ===
| Result | Year | Tournament | Surface | Partner | Opponents | Score |
|---|---|---|---|---|---|---|
| Win | 2020 | French Open, France | Clay | (Italy) Lisa Pigato | (Russia) Maria Bondarenko (Russia) Diana Shnaider | 7–6^{(3)}, 6–4 |
