= 2025 Emilia-Romagna Open =

- Date: 12–17 May (women); 16–21 June (men)
- Edition: 5th (women); 7th (men)
- Category: ATP Challenger 125; WTA 125
- Surface: Clay
- Location: Sassuolo, Italy (men); Parma, Italy (women)

Champions

Men's singles
- (Spain) Carlos Taberner

Women's singles
- (Egypt) Mayar Sherif

Men's doubles
- (Australia) Matthew Romios / (United States) Ryan Seggerman

Women's doubles
- (Czech Republic) Jesika Malečková / (Czech Republic) Miriam Škoch
← 2024 ·	Emilia-Romagna Open	· 2026 →

The 2025 Emilia-Romagna Open, known as the Emilia-Romagna Tennis Cup for men and Parma Ladies Open presented by Iren for women, is a professional tennis tournament played on clay courts in Sassuolo, Italy as an ATP Challenger Tour 125 event and in Parma, Italy as a WTA 125 event. The seventh edition of the men's event is to be held between 16 and 21 June on the 2025 ATP Challenger Tour and the fifth edition for the women as part of the 2025 WTA 125 tournaments between 12 and 17 May.

== Champions ==
=== Men's singles ===
- (Spain) Carlos Taberner def. (Serbia) Dušan Lajović 7–6^{(7–1)}, 6–2.

=== Women's singles ===
- (Egypt) Mayar Sherif def. (Canada) Victoria Mboko 6–4, 6–4

=== Men's doubles ===
- (Australia) Matthew Romios / (United States) Ryan Seggerman def. (Austria) Alexander Erler / (Germany) Constantin Frantzen 7–6^{(7–4)}, 3–6, [10–7].

=== Women's doubles ===
- (Czech Republic) Jesika Malečková / (Czech Republic) Miriam Škoch def. (United States) Sabrina Santamaria / (China) Tang Qianhui 6–2, 6–0

== Men's singles main-draw entrants ==
=== Seeds ===
Country	Player	Rank^{1}	Seed
ESP	Carlos Taberner	128	1
LTU	Vilius Gaubas	133	2
SRB	Dušan Lajović	137	3
ITA	Francesco Passaro	141	4
JPN	Taro Daniel	153	5
SUI	Stan Wawrinka	155	6
AUT	Lukas Neumayer	166	7
ECU	Álvaro Guillén Meza	175	8

- ^{1} Rankings are as of 9 June 2025.

=== Other entrants ===
The following players received wildcards into the singles main draw:

- (Italy) Federico Bondioli
- (Switzerland) Stan Wawrinka
- (Italy) Giulio Zeppieri

The following player received entry into the singles main draw through the Next Gen Accelerator programme:

- (Japan) Rei Sakamoto

The following player received entry into the singles main draw as an alternate:

- (Italy) Stefano Travaglia

The following players received entry from the qualifying draw:

- (Italy) Marco Cecchinato
- (Italy) Giovanni Fonio
- (Italy) Stefano Napolitano
- (Netherlands) Ryan Nijboer
- (Ukraine) Oleg Prihodko
- (Sweden) Elias Ymer

The following players received entry as lucky losers:

- (Italy) Raúl Brancaccio
- (Spain) Oriol Roca Batalla

== Women's singles main-draw entrants ==
=== Seeds ===
Country	Player	Rank^{†}	Seed
KAZ	Yulia Putintseva	29	1
CHN	Wang Xinyu	43	2
USA	Alycia Parks	51	3
COL	Camila Osorio	55	4
EGY	Mayar Sherif	64	5
MEX	Renata Zarazúa	69	6
TUR	Zeynep Sönmez	76	7
ROU	Irina-Camelia Begu	83	8

^{†} Rankings are as of 5 May 2025.

=== Other entrants ===
The following players received wildcard entry into the singles main draw:

- (Colombia) Camila Osorio
- (Italy) Camilla Rosatello
- (China) Wang Xinyu
- (Italy) Aurora Zantedeschi

The following players received entry from qualifying draw:

- (Italy) Nicole Fossa Huergo
- (Germany) Anna-Lena Friedsam
- (Austria) Julia Grabher
- (Romania) Patricia Maria Țig

=== Withdrawals ===
Before the tournament

- (Spain) Jéssica Bouzas Maneiro → replaced by (Germany) Ella Seidel
- (Czech Republic) Marie Bouzková → replaced by (China) Zhang Shuai
- (Italy) Lucia Bronzetti → replaced by (Switzerland) Simona Waltert
- (Philippines) Alexandra Eala → replaced by (Liechtenstein) Kathinka von Deichmann
- (United Kingdom) Harriet Dart → replaced by (China) Wang Xiyu
- Polina Kudermetova → replaced by (Canada) Victoria Mboko
- (Canada) Rebecca Marino → replaced by (Canada) Marina Stakusic
- (Belgium) Greet Minnen → replaced by (Andorra) Victoria Jiménez Kasintseva
- (Spain) Sara Sorribes Tormo → replaced by (Latvia) Darja Semeņistaja
- (Australia) Ajla Tomljanović → replaced by (Japan) Ena Shibahara
- (United States) Taylor Townsend → replaced by (Hungary) Panna Udvardy

== Women's doubles draw entrants ==
=== Seeds ===
Country	Player	Country	Player	Rank^{1}	Seed
KAZ	Anna Danilina	ITA	Angelica Moratelli	85	1
CHN	Xu Yifan	CHN	Zheng Saisai	100	2
POL	Katarzyna Piter	EGY	Mayar Sherif	123	3
USA	Sabrina Santamaria	CHN	Tang Qianhui	144	4

- ^{1} Rankings as of 5 May 2025.

=== Other entrants ===
The following pairs received wildcards into the doubles main draw:

- (Italy) Anastasia Abbagnato / (Italy) Arianna Zucchini
