= 2021 ITF World Tennis Tour Gran Canaria =

Tennis tournament

- Date: 9–15 August 2021
- Edition: 1st
- Category: ITF Women's World Tennis Tour
- Prize money: $60,000
- Surface: Clay
- Location: San Bartolomé de Tirajana, Spain

Champions

Singles
- (Netherlands) Arantxa Rus

Doubles
- (Russia) Elina Avanesyan / (Russia) Oksana Selekhmeteva
- ITF World Tennis Tour Gran Canaria

The 2021 ITF World Tennis Tour Gran Canaria was a professional women's tennis tournament played on outdoor clay courts. It was the first edition of the tournament which was part of the 2021 ITF Women's World Tennis Tour. It took place in San Bartolomé de Tirajana, Spain between 9 and 15 August 2021.

== Singles main-draw entrants ==
=== Seeds ===
| Country | Player | Rank^{1} | Seed |
|---|---|---|---|
| NED | Arantxa Rus | 79 | 1 |
| EGY | Mayar Sherif | 119 | 2 |
| ROU | Jaqueline Cristian | 149 | 3 |
| FRA | Tessah Andrianjafitrimo | 201 | 4 |
| AUT | Julia Grabher | 205 | 5 |
| GRE | Despina Papamichail | 224 | 6 |
| CHI | Daniela Seguel | 226 | 7 |
| ESP | Rebeka Masarova | 231 | 8 |

- ^{1} Rankings are as of 2 August 2021.

=== Other entrants ===
The following players received wildcards into the singles main draw:

- (Spain) Lucía Cortez Llorca
- (Romania) Jaqueline Cristian
- (Spain) Ana Lantigua de la Nuez
- (Spain) Leyre Romero Gormaz

The following player received entry using a junior exempt:

- (Andorra) Victoria Jiménez Kasintseva

The following players received entry from the qualifying draw:

- (Russia) Elina Avanesyan
- (Spain) Yvonne Cavallé Reimers
- (Chile) Bárbara Gatica
- (Portugal) Francisca Jorge
- (South Korea) Park So-hyun
- (Russia) Maria Timofeeva

The following player received entry as a lucky loser:

- (United States) Ashley Lahey

== Champions ==
=== Singles ===
- (Netherlands) Arantxa Rus def. (Egypt) Mayar Sherif, 6–4, 6–2

=== Doubles ===
- (Russia) Elina Avanesyan / (Russia) Oksana Selekhmeteva def. (Netherlands) Arianne Hartono / (Australia) Olivia Tjandramulia, 7–5, 6–2
