= 2022 ITF World Tennis Tour Maspalomas =

Tennis tournament

- Date: 8–14 August 2022
- Edition: 2nd
- Category: ITF Women's World Tennis Tour
- Prize money: $60,000
- Surface: Clay / Outdoor
- Location: San Bartolomé de Tirajana, Spain

Champions

Singles
- (Austria) Julia Grabher

Doubles
- (Spain) Ángela Fita Boluda / (Netherlands) Arantxa Rus
| ← 2021 · | ITF World Tennis Tour Gran Canaria | · 2023 → |

The 2022 ITF World Tennis Tour Maspalomas was a professional tennis tournament played on outdoor clay courts. It was the second edition of the tournament which was part of the 2022 ITF Women's World Tennis Tour. It took place in San Bartolomé de Tirajana, Spain between 8 and 14 August 2022.

== Champions ==
=== Singles ===
- (Austria) Julia Grabher def. (Argentina) Nadia Podoroska, 6–4, 6–3

=== Doubles ===
- (Spain) Ángela Fita Boluda / (Netherlands) Arantxa Rus def. Elina Avanesyan / Diana Shnaider, 6–4, 6–4

== Singles main draw entrants ==
=== Seeds ===
| Country | Player | Rank^{1} | Seed |
|---|---|---|---|
| NED | Arantxa Rus | 84 | 1 |
| | Elina Avanesyan | 129 | 2 |
| AUT | Julia Grabher | 131 | 3 |
| ~~ROU~~ | ~~Mihaela Buzărnescu~~ | ~~133~~ | ~~4~~ |
| ARG | Nadia Podoroska | 190 | 5 |
| NED | Suzan Lamens | 197 | 6 |
| | Diana Shnaider | 264 | 7 |
| ESP | Ángela Fita Boluda | 267 | 8 |
| ESP | Yvonne Cavallé Reimers | 268 | 9 |
| FRA | Carole Monnet | 273 | 10 |
| ITA | Giulia Gatto-Monticone | 276 | 11 |
| CHI | Daniela Seguel | 284 | 12 |
| ESP | Rosa Vicens Mas | 287 | 13 |
| ESP | Irene Burillo Escorihuela | 298 | 14 |
| ESP | Leyre Romero Gormaz | 300 | 15 |
| ESP | Jéssica Bouzas Maneiro | 301 | 16 |

- ^{1} Rankings are as of 1 August 2022.

=== Other entrants ===
The following players received wildcards into the singles main draw:

- Elina Avanesyan
- (Spain) Noelia Bouzó Zanotti
- (Spain) Xiomara Estévez Grillo
- (Spain) Marta García Reboredo
- (Spain) Marta González Encinas

The following player received entry into the singles main draw using a protected ranking:

- (United States) Maria Mateas

The following players received entry from the qualifying draw:

- (Spain) Paula Arias Manjón
- (Italy) Gloria Ceschi
- (Denmark) Olivia Gram
- (Norway) Lilly Elida Håseth
- (Spain) Claudia Hoste Ferrer
- (Bulgaria) Lia Karatancheva
- (Greece) Martha Matoula
- (Slovakia) Radka Zelníčková

The following player received entry as a lucky loser:

- (Japan) Kanako Morisaki
