= 2021 ITF World Tennis Tour Maspalomas =

Tennis tournament

- Date: 16–22 August 2021
- Edition: 1st
- Category: ITF Women's World Tennis Tour
- Prize money: $60,000
- Surface: Clay
- Location: San Bartolomé de Tirajana, Spain

Champions

Singles
- (Netherlands) Arantxa Rus

Doubles
- (Netherlands) Arianne Hartono / (Australia) Olivia Tjandramulia
ITF World Tennis Tour Maspalomas	· 2022 →

The 2021 ITF World Tennis Tour Maspalomas was a professional women's tennis tournament played on outdoor clay courts. It was the first edition of the tournament which was part of the 2021 ITF Women's World Tennis Tour. It took place in San Bartolomé de Tirajana, Spain between 16 and 22 August 2021.

== Singles main-draw entrants ==
=== Seeds ===
Country	Player	Rank^{1}	Seed
NED	Arantxa Rus	80	1
SRB	Aleksandra Krunić	197	2
AUT	Julia Grabher	204	3
JPN	Yuki Naito	221	4
AUS	Seone Mendez	224	5
FRA	Diane Parry	245	6
ITA	Lucrezia Stefanini	251	7
MEX	Ana Sofía Sánchez	256	8

- ^{1} Rankings are as of 9 August 2021.

=== Other entrants ===
The following players received wildcards into the singles main draw:

- (Spain) Jéssica Bouzas Maneiro
- (Spain) Ana Lantigua de la Nuez
- (Spain) Guiomar Maristany
- (Spain) Carlota Martínez Círez

The following player received entry using a protected ranking:

- (Germany) Anna Zaja

The following player received entry as a special exempt:

- (Bosnia and Herzegovina) Dea Herdželaš

The following players received entry from the qualifying draw:

- (United States) Jessie Aney
- (Romania) Ilona Georgiana Ghioroaie
- (Andorra) Victoria Jiménez Kasintseva
- (United States) Ashley Lahey
- (Spain) Estela Pérez Somarriba
- (Russia) Maria Timofeeva

== Champions ==
=== Singles ===
- (Netherlands) Arantxa Rus def. (Andorra) Victoria Jiménez Kasintseva, 6–0, 6–1

=== Doubles ===
- (Netherlands) Arianne Hartono / (Australia) Olivia Tjandramulia def. (Argentina) María Lourdes Carlé / (Argentina) Julieta Estable, 6–4, 2–6, [10–7]
