= 2022 ITF World Tennis Tour Maspalomas – Singles =

Singles
- 2022 ITF World Tennis Tour Maspalomas

Final
- Champion: (Austria) Julia Grabher
- Runner-up: (Argentina) Nadia Podoroska
- Score: 6–4, 6–3

Events
Singles	Doubles
← 2021 ·	ITF World Tennis Tour Maspalomas	· 2023 →

Arantxa Rus was the defending champion but lost to Nadia Podoroska in the quarterfinals.

Julia Grabher won the title, defeating Podoroska in the final, 6–4, 6–3.

== Seeds ==
All seeds receive a bye into the second round.

1. (Netherlands) Arantxa Rus (quarterfinals)
2. Elina Avanesyan (third round)
3. (Austria) Julia Grabher (champion)
4. (Romania) Mihaela Buzărnescu (withdrew)
5. (Argentina) Nadia Podoroska (final)
6. (Netherlands) Suzan Lamens (semifinals)
7. Diana Shnaider (quarterfinals)
8. (Spain) Ángela Fita Boluda (third round)
9. (Spain) Yvonne Cavallé Reimers (second round)
10. (France) Carole Monnet (third round)
11. (Italy) Giulia Gatto-Monticone (second round)
12. (Chile) Daniela Seguel (second round)
13. (Spain) Rosa Vicens Mas (third round)
14. (Spain) Irene Burillo Escorihuela (third round)
15. (Spain) Leyre Romero Gormaz (third round)
16. (Spain) Jéssica Bouzas Maneiro (quarterfinals)

== Draw ==
=== Key ===
- Q = Qualifier
- WC = Wild card
- LL = Lucky loser
- Alt = Alternate
- SE = Special exempt
- PR = Protected ranking
- ITF = ITF entry
- JE = Junior exempt
- w/o = Walkover
- r = Retired
- d = Defaulted
- SR = Special ranking

=== Finals ===
Quarterfinals
1	(Netherlands) Arantxa Rus	4	7^{8}	5
5	(Argentina) Nadia Podoroska	6	6^{6}	7
Polina Kudermetova	6	6
7	Diana Shnaider	3	3
(Czech Republic) Barbora Palicová	4	3
3	(Austria) Julia Grabher	6	6
6	(Netherlands) Suzan Lamens	6	6
16	(Spain) Jéssica Bouzas Maneiro	3	3

Semifinals
5	(Argentina) Nadia Podoroska	7^{9}	6
Polina Kudermetova	6^{7}	4
3	(Austria) Julia Grabher	6	6
6	(Netherlands) Suzan Lamens	3	4

Final
5	(Argentina) Nadia Podoroska	4	3
3	(Austria) Julia Grabher	6	6

=== Top half ===
==== Section 1 ====
First round
(Spain) L Cortez Llorca	6	3	4
(Algeria) I Ibbou	3	6	6
Q	(Slovakia) R Zelníčková	4	6	6
(Italy) D Cherubini	6	3	3
(Spain) A Mintegi del Olmo	6	6
Q	(Spain) P Arias Manjón	2	3
(India) R Bhosale	7^{7}	6
(Australia) A Osborne	6^{5}	1

Second round
1	(Netherlands) A Rus	5
(Algeria) I Ibbou	2^{r}
Q	(Slovakia) R Zelníčková	3	2^{r}
15	(Spain) L Romero Gormaz	6	5
12	(Chile) D Seguel	3	1
(Spain) A Mintegi del Olmo	6	6
(India) R Bhosale	0	6^{2}
5	(Argentina) N Podoroska	6	7^{7}

Third round
1	(Netherlands) A Rus	6	5	6
15	(Spain) L Romero Gormaz	1	7	3
(Spain) A Mintegi del Olmo	3	3
5	(Argentina) N Podoroska	6	6

Quarterfinals
1	(Netherlands) A Rus	4	7^{8}	5
5	(Argentina) N Podoroska	6	6^{6}	7

==== Section 2 ====
First round
(Switzerland) L Küng	3	1
P Kudermetova	6	6
(Germany) S Herrmann	6	6
WC	(Spain) M García Reboredo	1	2
(Chinese Taipei) E-s Liang	1	5
(Germany) C Sauvant	6	7
Q	(Denmark) O Gram	3	2
(Czech Republic) A Laboutková	6	6

Second round
Q	(Greece) M Matoula	6	1	4
P Kudermetova	4	6	6
(Germany) S Herrmann	5	4
13	(Spain) R Vicens Mas	7	6
10	(France) C Monnet	6	6
(Germany) C Sauvant	4	2
(Czech Republic) A Laboutková	4	2
7	D Shnaider	6	6

Third round
P Kudermetova	6	6
13	(Spain) R Vicens Mas	1	2
10	(France) C Monnet	2	5
7	D Shnaider	6	7

Quarterfinals
P Kudermetova	6	6
7	D Shnaider	3	3

=== Bottom half ===
==== Section 3 ====
First round
(Hungary) N Szabanin	6	6
LL	(Japan) K Morisaki	4	4
(Czech Republic) B Palicová	6	6
(Argentina) M Capurro Taborda	4	3
WC	(Spain) X Estévez Grillo	0	0
Q	(Norway) LE Håseth	6	6
(Italy) F Rossi	5	3^{r}
WC	(Spain) N Bouzó Zanotti	7	4

Second round
8	(Spain) Á Fita Boluda	6	5	6
(Hungary) N Szabanin	2	7	4
(Czech Republic) B Palicová	3	6	6
9	(Spain) Y Cavallé Reimers	6	2	4
14	(Spain) I Burillo Escorihuela	6	6
Q	(Norway) LE Håseth	0	4
WC	(Spain) N Bouzó Zanotti	1	2
3	(Austria) J Grabher	6	6

Third round
8	(Spain) Á Fita Boluda	3	6	6^{3}
(Czech Republic) B Palicová	6	3	7^{7}
14	(Spain) I Burillo Escorihuela	2	4
3	(Austria) J Grabher	6	6

Quarterfinals
(Czech Republic) B Palicová	4	3
3	(Austria) J Grabher	6	6

==== Section 4 ====
First round
Q	(Spain) C Hoste Ferrer	6	7
WC	(Spain) M González Encinas	3	5
(Colombia) M Herazo González	6	2	4
(Norway) M Helgø	4	6	6
Q	(Italy) G Ceschi	6	6
PR	(United States) M Mateas	3	4
(Malta) F Curmi	7	6
Q	(Bulgaria) L Karatancheva	5	4

Second round
6	(Netherlands) S Lamens	6	6
Q	(Spain) C Hoste Ferrer	2	1
(Norway) M Helgø	6	6
11	(Italy) G Gatto-Monticone	2	3
16	(Spain) J Bouzas Maneiro	6	6
Q	(Italy) G Ceschi	1	0
(Malta) F Curmi	3	1
2/WC	E Avanesyan	6	6

Third round
6	(Netherlands) S Lamens	7^{7}	6
(Norway) M Helgø	6^{4}	1
16	(Spain) J Bouzas Maneiro	7^{13}	7^{7}
2/WC	E Avanesyan	6^{11}	6^{4}

Quarterfinals
6	(Netherlands) S Lamens	6	6
16	(Spain) J Bouzas Maneiro	3	3
