= 2022 ITF World Tennis Tour Maspalomas – Doubles =

Doubles
- 2022 ITF World Tennis Tour Maspalomas

Final
- Champions: (Spain) Ángela Fita Boluda (Netherlands) Arantxa Rus
- Runners-up: Elina Avanesyan; Diana Shnaider
- Score: 6–4, 6–4

Events
Singles	Doubles
← 2021 ·	ITF World Tennis Tour Maspalomas	· 2023 →

Arianne Hartono and Olivia Tjandramulia were the defending champions but chose not to participate.

Ángela Fita Boluda and Arantxa Rus won the title, defeating Elina Avanesyan and Diana Shnaider in the final, 6–4, 6–4.

== Seeds ==
1. (Spain) Ángela Fita Boluda / (Netherlands) Arantxa Rus (champions)
2. (India) Rutuja Bhosale / (Australia) Alexandra Osborne (first round)
3. (Colombia) María Herazo González / (France) Carole Monnet (quarterfinals)
4. (Argentina) Martina Capurro Taborda / (Chile) Daniela Seguel (quarterfinals)

== Draw ==
=== Key ===
- Q = Qualifier
- WC = Wild card
- LL = Lucky loser
- Alt = Alternate
- SE = Special exempt
- PR = Protected ranking
- ITF = ITF entry
- JE = Junior exempt
- w/o = Walkover
- r = Retired
- d = Defaulted
- SR = Special ranking

=== Draw ===
First round
1	(Spain) Á Fita Boluda (Netherlands) A Rus	6	6
(Japan) E Hayashi (Japan) K Morisaki	1	4
(Germany) L Böhner (Czech Republic) L Pulchartová	6	4	[12]
WC	(Spain) P Arias Manjón (Spain) L Cortez Llorca	4	6	[10]
4	(Argentina) M Capurro Taborda (Chile) D Seguel	6	6
(Switzerland) L Küng (United States) M Mateas	4	2
WC	(Spain) N Bouzó Zanotti (Spain) I Burillo Escorihuela	6	5	[5]
(Norway) M Helgø (Netherlands) S Lamens	3	7	[10]
E Avanesyan; D Shnaider	5
(Italy) G Gatto-Monticone (Italy) F Rossi	2^{r}
WC	(Spain) M García Reboredo (Mexico) CS Martínez Solis	1	5
3	(Colombia) M Herazo González (France) C Monnet	6	7
(Czech Republic) B Palicová (Hungary) N Szabanin	6^{4}	3
(Spain) Y Cavallé Reimers (Spain) R Vicens Mas	7^{7}	6
(Czech Republic) A Laboutková (Slovakia) R Zelníčková	7	6
2	(India) R Bhosale (Australia) A Osborne	5	4

Quarterfinals
1	(Spain) Á Fita Boluda (Netherlands) A Rus	6	6
(Germany) L Böhner (Czech Republic) L Pulchartová	3	0
4	(Argentina) M Capurro Taborda (Chile) D Seguel	2	5
(Norway) M Helgø (Netherlands) S Lamens	6	7
E Avanesyan; D Shnaider	6	7
3	(Colombia) M Herazo González (France) C Monnet	2	5
(Spain) Y Cavallé Reimers (Spain) R Vicens Mas	w/o
(Czech Republic) A Laboutková (Slovakia) R Zelníčková

Semifinals
1	(Spain) Á Fita Boluda (Netherlands) A Rus	6	6
(Norway) M Helgø (Netherlands) S Lamens	4	1
E Avanesyan; D Shnaider	6	6
(Spain) Y Cavallé Reimers (Spain) R Vicens Mas	4	3

Final
1	(Spain) Á Fita Boluda (Netherlands) A Rus	6	6
E Avanesyan; D Shnaider	4	4
