= 2021 Reinert Open – Doubles =

Doubles
- 2021 Reinert Open

Final
- Champions: (Kazakhstan) Anna Danilina (Ukraine) Valeriya Strakhova
- Runners-up: (Sweden) Mirjam Björklund (Australia) Jaimee Fourlis
- Score: 4–6, 7–5, [10–4]

Events
| Singles | Doubles |
| ← 2019 · | Reinert Open | · 2022 → |

Amina Anshba and Anastasia Dețiuc were the defending champions but chose not to participate.

Anna Danilina and Valeriya Strakhova won the title, defeating Mirjam Björklund and Jaimee Fourlis in the final, 4–6, 7–5, [10–4].

== Seeds ==
1. (Kazakhstan) Anna Danilina / (Ukraine) Valeriya Strakhova (champions)
2. (Germany) Tamara Korpatsch / (Slovakia) Tereza Mihalíková (quarterfinals)
3. (Germany) Tayisiya Morderger / (Germany) Yana Morderger (semifinals)
4. (India) Rutuja Bhosale / (Netherlands) Arianne Hartono (semifinals)

== Draw ==
Key

- Q = Qualifier
- WC = Wild card
- LL = Lucky loser
- Alt = Alternate
- ITF = ITF entry
- PR = Protected ranking
- SR = Special ranking
- SE = Special exempt
- JE = Junior exempt
- JR = Junior Accelerator Programme entrant
- CO = College Accelerator Programme entrant
- NG = Next Gen Accelerator Program entrant
- w/o = Walkover
- r = Retired
- d = Defaulted

=== Draw ===
First round
(Germany) N Noha Akugue (Germany) N Rivkin | 6 | 6
(Ukraine) M Kostiuk (Australia) A Parnaby | 2 | 4
4 | (India) R Bhosale (Netherlands) A Hartono | 3 | 6 | [10]
(United Kingdom) F Christie (Australia) O Tjandramulia | 6 | 4 | [6]
(Italy) M Caregaro (Germany) K Gerlach | 0 | 4
(Netherlands) I Haverlag (Germany) A Klasen | 6 | 6
(Bulgaria) D Evtimova (Austria) J Grabher | 7^{7} | 6
(Australia) S Mendez (United States) K Stewart | 6^{4} | 3
(Germany) N Schunk (Germany) Jo Steur | 4 | 3
3 | (Germany) T Morderger (Germany) Y Morderger | 6 | 6
(Russia) E Kazionova (Russia) E Makarova | 4 | 2
(Sweden) M Björklund (Australia) J Fourlis | 6 | 6
(United States) E Halbauer (United States) C Scholl | 2 | 6^{2}
2 | (Germany) T Korpatsch (Slovakia) T Mihalíková | 6 | 7^{7}

Quarterfinals
1 | (Kazakhstan) A Danilina (Ukraine) V Strakhova | 6 | 7
(Germany) N Noha Akugue (Germany) N Rivkin | 2 | 5
4 | (India) R Bhosale (Netherlands) A Hartono | 6 | 6
(Netherlands) I Haverlag (Germany) A Klasen | 1 | 1
(Bulgaria) D Evtimova (Austria) J Grabher | 7 | 4 | [5]
3 | (Germany) T Morderger (Germany) Y Morderger | 5 | 6 | [10]
(Sweden) M Björklund (Australia) J Fourlis | 2 | 6 | [10]
2 | (Germany) T Korpatsch (Slovakia) T Mihalíková | 6 | 1 | [2]

Semifinals
1 | (Kazakhstan) A Danilina (Ukraine) V Strakhova | 6 | 0 | [10]
4 | (India) R Bhosale (Netherlands) A Hartono | 3 | 6 | [5]
3 | (Germany) T Morderger (Germany) Y Morderger | 3 | 6^{1}
(Sweden) M Björklund (Australia) J Fourlis | 6 | 7^{7}

Final
1 | (Kazakhstan) A Danilina (Ukraine) V Strakhova | 4 | 7 | [10]
(Sweden) M Björklund (Australia) J Fourlis | 6 | 5 | [4]
