= 2021 ITF World Tennis Tour Gran Canaria – Singles =

Singles
- 2021 ITF World Tennis Tour Gran Canaria

Final
- Champion: (Netherlands) Arantxa Rus
- Runner-up: (Egypt) Mayar Sherif
- Score: 6–4, 6–2

Events
Singles	Doubles
ITF World Tennis Tour Gran Canaria	· 2022 →

This was the first edition of the tournament.

Arantxa Rus won the title, defeating Mayar Sherif in the final, 6–4, 6–2.

== Seeds ==
1. (Netherlands) Arantxa Rus (champion)
2. (Egypt) Mayar Sherif (final)
3. (Romania) Jaqueline Cristian (quarterfinals)
4. (France) Tessah Andrianjafitrimo (second round)
5. (Austria) Julia Grabher (second round)
6. (Greece) Despina Papamichail (first round)
7. (Chile) Daniela Seguel (second round)
8. (Spain) Rebeka Masarova (second round)

== Draw ==
=== Key ===
- Q = Qualifier
- WC = Wild card
- LL = Lucky loser
- Alt = Alternate
- SE = Special exempt
- PR = Protected ranking
- ITF = ITF entry
- JE = Junior exempt
- w/o = Walkover
- r = Retired
- d = Defaulted
- SR = Special ranking

=== Finals ===
Semifinals
1	(Netherlands) Arantxa Rus	6	6
Q	(Russia) Elina Avanesyan	1	2
(Serbia) Aleksandra Krunić	6^{5}	3
2	(Egypt) Mayar Sherif	7^{7}	6

Final
1	(Netherlands) Arantxa Rus	6	6
2	(Egypt) Mayar Sherif	4	2

=== Top half ===
First round
1	(Netherlands) A Rus	7^{9}	6
LL	(United States) A Lahey	6^{7}	1
(Spain) G Maristany	6	6
(United Kingdom) K Swan	3	3
(France) D Parry	7	6
JE	(Andorra) V Jiménez Kasintseva	5	4
(Spain) M Bassols Ribera	6^{1}	5
8	(Spain) R Masarova	7^{7}	7
4	(France) T Andrianjafitrimo	6	3	6
WC	(Spain) L Romero Gormaz	2	6	4
Q	(Russia) E Avanesyan	4	6	6
(Argentina) ML Carlé	6	4	0
WC	(Spain) L Cortez Llorca	2	5
(Spain) J Bouzas Maneiro	6	7
Q	(South Korea) S-h Park	2	0
5	(Austria) J Grabher	6	6

Second round
1	(Netherlands) A Rus	6	6
(Spain) G Maristany	1	4
(France) D Parry	6	6
8	(Spain) R Masarova	1	4
4	(France) T Andrianjafitrimo	3	6^{2}
Q	(Russia) E Avanesyan	6	7^{7}
(Spain) J Bouzas Maneiro	6	6
5	(Austria) J Grabher	3	3

Quarterfinals
1	(Netherlands) A Rus	6	6
(France) D Parry	3	2
Q	(Russia) E Avanesyan	6	7^{7}
(Spain) J Bouzas Maneiro	4	6^{3}

Semifinals
1	(Netherlands) A Rus	6	6
Q	(Russia) E Avanesyan	1	2

=== Bottom half ===
First round
6	(Greece) D Papamichail	3	6^{3}
Q	(Chile) B Gatica	6	7^{7}
(Netherlands) A Hartono	2	5
(Serbia) A Krunić	6	7
WC	(Spain) A Lantigua de la Nuez	2	5
(Spain) M Gutiérrez Carrasco	6	7
Q	(Russia) M Timofeeva	4	3
3/WC	(Romania) J Cristian	6	6
7	(Chile) D Seguel	7^{8}	4	6
(Netherlands) R Hogenkamp	6^{6}	6	4
Q	(Portugal) F Jorge	0	1
(Russia) O Selekhmeteva	6	6
(Mexico) AS Sánchez	6	3	2
Q	(Spain) Y Cavallé Reimers	2	6	6
(Spain) I Burillo Escorihuela	1	2
2	(Egypt) M Sherif	6	6

Second round
Q	(Chile) B Gatica	3	6	3
(Serbia) A Krunić	6	2	6
(Spain) M Gutiérrez Carrasco	6	4	1
3/WC	(Romania) J Cristian	3	6	6
7	(Chile) D Seguel	3	4
(Russia) O Selekhmeteva	6	6
Q	(Spain) Y Cavallé Reimers	2	1
2	(Egypt) M Sherif	6	6

Quarterfinals
(Serbia) A Krunić	7^{8}	6
3/WC	(Romania) J Cristian	6^{6}	3
(Russia) O Selekhmeteva	3	6	3
2	(Egypt) M Sherif	6	4	6

Semifinals
(Serbia) A Krunić	6^{5}	3
2	(Egypt) M Sherif	7^{7}	6
