= 2021 Reinert Open – Singles =

Singles
- 2021 Reinert Open

Final
- Champion: (Russia) Elina Avanesyan
- Runner-up: (Italy) Federica Di Sarra
- Score: 6–7^{(4–7)}, 6–2, 6–2

Events
Singles	Doubles
← 2019 ·	Reinert Open	· 2022 →

Nina Stojanović was the defending champion but chose to compete at the 2020 Summer Olympics instead.

Lucky loser Elina Avanesyan won the title, defeating Federica Di Sarra in the final, 6–7^{(4–7)}, 6–2, 6–2.

== Seeds ==
1. (Germany) Tamara Korpatsch (second round)
2. (Spain) Lara Arruabarrena (second round)
3. (Austria) Julia Grabher (second round)
4. (Chile) Daniela Seguel (first round)
5. (Germany) Katharina Gerlach (first round)
6. (United States) Alycia Parks (first round)
7. (Netherlands) Richèl Hogenkamp (second round)
8. (Belgium) Marie Benoît (first round)

== Draw ==
Key

- Q = Qualifier
- WC = Wild card
- LL = Lucky loser
- Alt = Alternate
- ITF = ITF entry
- PR = Protected ranking
- SR = Special ranking
- SE = Special exempt
- JE = Junior exempt
- JR = Junior Accelerator Programme entrant
- CO = College Accelerator Programme entrant
- NG = Next Gen Accelerator Program entrant
- w/o = Walkover
- r = Retired
- d = Defaulted

=== Finals ===
Semifinals
LL	(Russia) Elina Avanesyan	7	7^{8}
(Sweden) Mirjam Björklund	5	6^{6}
(Italy) Federica Di Sarra	3	6	6
Q	(Italy) Cristiana Ferrando	6	4	3

Final
LL	(Russia) Elina Avanesyan	6^{4}	6	6
(Italy) Federica Di Sarra	7^{7}	2	2

=== Top half ===
First round
1	(Germany) T Korpatsch	6	6
Q	(Netherlands) A Hartono	4	3
(United States) K Stewart	6^{4}	4
LL	(Russia) E Avanesyan	7^{7}	6
(Australia) S Mendez	1	6	1
(Kazakhstan) A Danilina	6	4	6
PR	(Germany) K Hobgarski	4	6	6
6	(United States) A Parks	6	4	2
3	(Austria) J Grabher	6	3
Q	(Russia) E Makarova	0	1^{r}
(Italy) M Di Giuseppe	3	6	1
Q	(Latvia) K Bartone	6	4	6
Q	(Italy) F Arcidiacono	3	6	3
(Italy) M Caregaro	6	3	6
(Sweden) M Björklund	6	6
5	(Germany) K Gerlach	4	2

Second round
1	(Germany) T Korpatsch	6	6^{3}	0
LL	(Russia) E Avanesyan	4	7^{7}	6
(Kazakhstan) A Danilina	6^{4}	6	6
PR	(Germany) K Hobgarski	7^{7}	3	2
3	(Austria) J Grabher	2	6^{7}
Q	(Latvia) K Bartone	6	7^{7}
(Italy) M Caregaro	1	1
(Sweden) M Björklund	6	6

Quarterfinals
LL	(Russia) E Avanesyan	7	4	6
(Kazakhstan) A Danilina	5	6	3
Q	(Latvia) K Bartone	4	1
(Sweden) M Björklund	6	6

Semifinals
LL	(Russia) E Avanesyan	7	7^{8}
(Sweden) M Björklund	5	6^{6}

=== Bottom half ===
First round
8	(Belgium) M Benoît	4	2
Q	(Spain) J Bouzas Maneiro	6	6
PR	(Australia) J Fourlis	6	4	7
Q	(United States) E Halbauer	3	6	5
(Italy) F Di Sarra	6	6
WC	(Germany) N Noha Akugue	1	1
Q	(Germany) A Klasen	6	6^{5}	6
4	(Chile) D Seguel	3	7^{7}	4
7	(Netherlands) R Hogenkamp	6	7^{7}
WC	(Germany) Jo Steur	4	6^{2}
PR	(Germany) A Zaja	6	3	6
(Georgia (country)) S Shapatava	1	6	1
Q	(Italy) C Ferrando	6	6
WC	(Germany) N Rivkin	1	3
WC	(Germany) N Schunk	3	2
2	(Spain) L Arruabarrena	6	6

Second round
Q	(Spain) J Bouzas Maneiro	6	2	3
PR	(Australia) J Fourlis	1	6	6
(Italy) F Di Sarra	6	6
Q	(Germany) A Klasen	4	4
7	(Netherlands) R Hogenkamp	6^{1}	2
PR	(Germany) A Zaja	7^{7}	6
Q	(Italy) C Ferrando	6	6
2	(Spain) L Arruabarrena	1	2

Quarterfinals
PR	(Australia) J Fourlis	3	4
(Italy) F Di Sarra	6	6
PR	(Germany) A Zaja	1	3
Q	(Italy) C Ferrando	6	6

Semifinals
(Italy) F Di Sarra	3	6	6
Q	(Italy) C Ferrando	6	4	3
