= 2022 Reinert Open – Singles =

Singles
- 2022 Reinert Open

Final
- Champion: (Czech Republic) Linda Nosková
- Runner-up: (Belgium) Ysaline Bonaventure
- Score: 6–1, 6–3

Events
Singles	Doubles
← 2021 ·	Reinert Open	· 2023 →

Elina Avanesyan was the defending champion but chose not to participate.

Linda Nosková won the title, defeating Ysaline Bonaventure in the final, 6–1, 6–3.

== Seeds ==
1. (France) Chloé Paquet (quarterfinals)
2. (Georgia (country)) Ekaterine Gorgodze (second round)
3. (Romania) Irina Bara (second round)
4. (Hungary) Réka Luca Jani (semifinals)
5. (Czech Republic) Linda Nosková (champion)
6. (Belgium) Ysaline Bonaventure (final)
7. (Austria) Julia Grabher (quarterfinals)
8. (Romania) Gabriela Lee (first round)

== Draw ==
Key

- Q = Qualifier
- WC = Wild card
- LL = Lucky loser
- Alt = Alternate
- ITF = ITF entry
- PR = Protected ranking
- SR = Special ranking
- SE = Special exempt
- JE = Junior exempt
- JR = Junior Accelerator Programme entrant
- CO = College Accelerator Programme entrant
- NG = Next Gen Accelerator Program entrant
- w/o = Walkover
- r = Retired
- d = Defaulted

=== Finals ===
Semifinals
5	(Czech Republic) Linda Nosková	6	4	6
4	(Hungary) Réka Luca Jani	2	6	2
(Argentina) Nadia Podoroska	6	3	3
6	(Belgium) Ysaline Bonaventure	4	6	6

Final
5	(Czech Republic) Linda Nosková	6	6
6	(Belgium) Ysaline Bonaventure	1	3

=== Top half ===
First round
1	(France) C Paquet	6	6
Q	E Makarova	2	1
Q	(Bulgaria) D Evtimova	6	1	7
Q	(Serbia) T Čurović	3	6	5
(Czech Republic) T Smitková	2	6	3
Q	J Avdeeva	6	3	6
Q	(Turkey) İ Yörük	2	1
5	(Czech Republic) L Nosková	6	6
4	(Hungary) RL Jani	6	6
(Japan) N Hibino	2	2
Q	(Hungary) A Nagy	0	3
(Slovakia) R Šramková	6	6
(Andorra) V Jiménez Kasintseva	1	2
WC	(Germany) N Noha Akugue	6	6
(Germany) L Siegemund	6	6^{6}	6
8	(Romania) G Lee	1	7^{8}	3

Second round
1	(France) C Paquet	6	6
Q	(Bulgaria) D Evtimova	0	1
Q	J Avdeeva	7^{7}	4	6^{3}
5	(Czech Republic) L Nosková	6^{4}	6	7^{7}
4	(Hungary) RL Jani	6	6
(Slovakia) R Šramková	4	3
WC	(Germany) N Noha Akugue	3	6	6
(Germany) L Siegemund	6	2	1

Quarterfinals
1	(France) C Paquet	3	2
5	(Czech Republic) L Nosková	6	6
4	(Hungary) RL Jani	7	6
WC	(Germany) N Noha Akugue	5	2

Semifinals
5	(Czech Republic) L Nosková	6	4	6
4	(Hungary) RL Jani	2	6	2

=== Bottom half ===
First round
7	(Austria) J Grabher	6	6
LL	(Australia) A Osborne	1	0
(Germany) N Schunk	6^{2}	6	6
Q	(Kazakhstan) A Danilina	7^{7}	2	0
WC	(Germany) S Wagner	6^{4}	2
(Argentina) N Podoroska	7^{7}	6
WC	(Germany) J Middendorf	2	6	5
3	(Romania) I Bara	6	2	7
6	(Belgium) Y Bonaventure	7	6
Q	E Reyngold	5	4
WC	(Germany) M Barthel	6	6^{6}	7
(Brazil) C Alves	2	7^{8}	5
(Netherlands) A Hartono	6	6^{5}	7^{8}
(Brazil) G Cé	2	7^{7}	6^{6}
Y Hatouka	6^{1}	3
2	(Georgia (country)) E Gorgodze	7^{7}	6

Second round
7	(Austria) J Grabher	7	6
(Germany) N Schunk	5	3
(Argentina) N Podoroska	6	7
3	(Romania) I Bara	1	5
6	(Belgium) Y Bonaventure	1	7	6
WC	(Germany) M Barthel	6	5	4
(Netherlands) A Hartono	7	5	6
2	(Georgia (country)) E Gorgodze	5	7	1

Quarterfinals
7	(Austria) J Grabher	6^{3}	7	4
(Argentina) N Podoroska	7^{7}	5	6
6	(Belgium) Y Bonaventure	2	6	6
(Netherlands) A Hartono	6	3	1

Semifinals
(Argentina) N Podoroska	6	3	3
6	(Belgium) Y Bonaventure	4	6	6
