= 2021 ITF World Tennis Tour Maspalomas – Singles =

Singles
- 2021 ITF World Tennis Tour Maspalomas

Final
- Champion: (Netherlands) Arantxa Rus
- Runner-up: (Andorra) Victoria Jiménez Kasintseva
- Score: 6–0, 6–1

Events
Singles	Doubles
ITF World Tennis Tour Maspalomas	· 2022 →

This was the first edition of the tournament.

Arantxa Rus won the title, defeating Victoria Jiménez Kasintseva in the final, 6–0, 6–1.

== Seeds ==
1. (Netherlands) Arantxa Rus (champion)
2. (Serbia) Aleksandra Krunić (quarterfinals)
3. (Austria) Julia Grabher (semifinals)
4. (Japan) Yuki Naito (first round)
5. (Australia) Seone Mendez (second round)
6. (France) Diane Parry (semifinals)
7. (Italy) Lucrezia Stefanini (first round)
8. (Mexico) Ana Sofía Sánchez (first round)

== Draw ==
=== Key ===
- Q = Qualifier
- WC = Wild card
- LL = Lucky loser
- Alt = Alternate
- SE = Special exempt
- PR = Protected ranking
- ITF = ITF entry
- JE = Junior exempt
- w/o = Walkover
- r = Retired
- d = Defaulted
- SR = Special ranking

=== Finals ===
Semifinals
1	(Netherlands) Arantxa Rus	6	6
3	(Austria) Julia Grabher	3	2
6	(France) Diane Parry	6	5	3
Q	(Andorra) Victoria Jiménez Kasintseva	3	7	6

Final
1	(Netherlands) Arantxa Rus	6	6
Q	(Andorra) Victoria Jiménez Kasintseva	0	1

=== Top half ===
First round
1	(Netherlands) A Rus	6	6
(United Kingdom) N Bains	3	1
WC	(Spain) J Bouzas Maneiro	1^{r}
(Brazil) G Cé	3
(Japan) YL Miyazaki	6^{5}	2
Q	(Russia) M Timofeeva	7^{7}	6
Q	(Romania) IG Ghioroaie	6	6
8	(Mexico) AS Sánchez	3	2
3	(Austria) J Grabher	6	6
(Italy) M Caregaro	3	0
Q	(United States) A Lahey	7^{7}	7^{7}
PR	(Germany) A Zaja	6^{1}	6^{2}
(France) C Monnet	6	6
Q	(United States) J Aney	2	2
(United Kingdom) K Swan	2	3
5	(Australia) S Mendez	6	6

Second round
1	(Netherlands) A Rus	6	7^{7}
(Brazil) G Cé	1	6^{1}
Q	(Russia) M Timofeeva	4	3
Q	(Romania) IG Ghioroaie	6	6
3	(Austria) J Grabher	6	4	6
Q	(United States) A Lahey	2	6	2
(France) C Monnet	7	4	6
5	(Australia) S Mendez	5	6	4

Quarterfinals
1	(Netherlands) A Rus	6	6
Q	(Romania) IG Ghioroaie	1	3
3	(Austria) J Grabher	6^{0}	6	6
(France) C Monnet	7^{7}	3	2

Semifinals
1	(Netherlands) A Rus	6	6
3	(Austria) J Grabher	3	2

=== Bottom half ===
First round
6	(France) D Parry	7	4	6
(Netherlands) A Hartono	5	6	1
WC	(Spain) C Martínez Círez	4	2
(Italy) C Ferrando	6	6
WC	(Spain) A Lantigua de la Nuez	2	6	2
(Italy) M Di Giuseppe	6	3	6
(Spain) M Gutiérrez Carrasco	6	3	6
4	(Japan) Y Naito	2	6	1
7	(Italy) L Stefanini	3	2
(Russia) O Selekhmeteva	6	6
Q	(Andorra) V Jiménez Kasintseva	6	6
Q	(Spain) E Pérez Somarriba	2	2
SE	(Bosnia and Herzegovina) D Herdželaš	6	3	3
(Argentina) ML Carlé	0	6	6
WC	(Spain) G Maristany	0	6	2
2	(Serbia) A Krunić	6	2	6

Second round
6	(France) D Parry	7	6
(Italy) C Ferrando	5	1
(Italy) M Di Giuseppe	6^{5}	6	7^{7}
(Spain) M Gutiérrez Carrasco	7^{7}	2	6^{1}
(Russia) O Selekhmeteva	1	1
Q	(Andorra) V Jiménez Kasintseva	6	6
(Argentina) ML Carlé	6	5	2
2	(Serbia) A Krunić	2	7	6

Quarterfinals
6	(France) D Parry	6	6
(Italy) M Di Giuseppe	2	3
Q	(Andorra) V Jiménez Kasintseva	6	1	6
2	(Serbia) A Krunić	4	6	1

Semifinals
6	(France) D Parry	6	5	3
Q	(Andorra) V Jiménez Kasintseva	3	7	6
