= 2015 Canberra Tennis International =

- Date: 1–8 November
- Edition: 1st
- Category: ATP Challenger Tour; ITF Women's Circuit
- Prize money: $50,000
- Surface: Hard
- Location: Canberra, Australia

Champions

Men's singles
- (Australia) Benjamin Mitchell

Women's singles
- (United States) Asia Muhammad

Men's doubles
- (Australia) Alex Bolt / (Australia) Andrew Whittington

Women's doubles
- (Japan) Misa Eguchi / (Japan) Eri Hozumi
Canberra Tennis International	· 2016 →

The 2015 Canberra Tennis International was a professional tennis tournament played on outdoor hard courts. It was the first edition of the tournament which was part of the 2015 ATP Challenger Tour and the 2015 ITF Women's Circuit. It took place in Canberra, Australia between 1 and 8 November 2015.

== Men's singles main draw entrants ==
=== Seeds ===
Country	Player	Rank^{1}	Seed
AUS	John Millman	77	1
AUS	Matthew Ebden	124	2
AUS	Jordan Thompson	164	3
GBR	Brydan Klein	187	4
AUS	Luke Saville	203	5
USA	Connor Smith	250	6
CHN	Zhe Li	269	7
AUS	Alex Bolt	275	8

- ^{1}Rankings are as of 19 October 2015.

=== Other entrants ===
The following players received wildcards into the singles main draw:

- (Australia) Jacob Grills
- (Australia) Harry Bourchier
- (Australia) Christopher O'Connell
- (Australia) Bradley Mousley

The following players received entry into the singles main draw with a protected ranking:

- (Australia) Greg Jones

The following players received entry from the qualifying draw:

- (Australia) Blake Mott
- (Australia) Oliver Anderson
- (Germany) Sebastian Fanselow
- (Australia) Jake Delaney

The following players received entry as a lucky loser:

- (Australia) Daniel Hobart

== Women's singles main draw entrants ==
=== Seeds ===
Country	Player	Rank^{1}	Seed
USA	Alexa Glatch	138	1
JPN	Eri Hozumi	177	2
NED	Cindy Burger	184	3
JPN	Misa Eguchi	205	4
CHN	Zhang Yuxuan	210	5
SWE	Susanne Celik	241	6
RUS	Natela Dzalamidze	253	7
KOR	Lee So-ra	267	8

- ^{1}Rankings are as of 26 October 2015.

=== Other entrants ===
The following players received wildcards into the singles main draw:

- (Australia) Maddison Inglis
- (Australia) Tammi Patterson
- (Australia) Olivia Tjandramulia

The following players received entry from the qualifying draw:

- (Australia) Destanee Aiava
- (United States) Veronica Corning
- (United States) Jennifer Elie
- (United States) Jessica Wacnik

The following player received entry by a lucky loser spot:

- (United States) Yuki Chiang

The following player received entry by a protected ranking:

- (Belarus) Ilona Kremen

== Champions ==
=== Men's singles ===
- (Australia) Benjamin Mitchell def. (Australia) Luke Saville 5–7, 6–0, 6–1

=== Women's singles ===
- (United States) Asia Muhammad def. (Japan) Eri Hozumi, 6–4, 6–3

=== Men's doubles ===
- (Australia) Alex Bolt / (Australia) Andrew Whittington def. (United Kingdom) Brydan Klein / (Australia) Dane Propoggia 7–6^{(7–2)}, 6–3

=== Women's doubles ===
- (Japan) Misa Eguchi / (Japan) Eri Hozumi def. (United States) Lauren Embree / (United States) Asia Muhammad, 7–6^{(15–13)}, 1–6, [14–12]
