= 2015 Canberra Tennis International – Women's singles =

Women's singles
- 2015 Canberra Tennis International

Final
- Champion: (United States) Asia Muhammad
- Runner-up: (Japan) Eri Hozumi
- Score: 6–4, 6–3

Events
| Singles | men | women |
| Doubles | men | women |
| ← 2014 · | Canberra Tennis International | · 2016 → |

This was a new event in the ITF Women's Circuit.

Asia Muhammad won the title, defeating Eri Hozumi in the final, 6–4, 6–3.

== Seeds ==
1. (United States) Alexa Glatch (withdrew)
2. (Japan) Eri Hozumi (final)
3. (Netherlands) Cindy Burger (second round)
4. (Japan) Misa Eguchi (semifinals)
5. (China) Zhang Yuxuan (first round)
6. (Sweden) Susanne Celik (first round)
7. (Russia) Natela Dzalamidze (first round)
8. (South Korea) Lee So-ra (second round)

== Main draw ==
=== Key ===
- Q = Qualifier
- WC = Wild card
- LL = Lucky loser
- Alt = Alternate
- SE = Special exempt
- PR = Protected ranking
- ITF = ITF entry
- JE = Junior exempt
- w/o = Walkover
- r = Retired
- d = Defaulted
- SR = Special ranking

=== Finals ===
Semifinals
(Australia) Kimberly Birrell | 3 | 7^{7} | 2
(United States) Asia Muhammad | 6 | 6^{2} | 6
4 | (Japan) Misa Eguchi | 4 | 0
2 | (Japan) Eri Hozumi | 6 | 6

Final
(United States) Asia Muhammad | 6 | 6
2 | (Japan) Eri Hozumi | 4 | 3

=== Top half ===
First round
LL | (United States) Y Chiang | 2 | 4
Q | (United States) J Wacnik | 6 | 6
(Japan) A Okuno | 6 | 7
(Australia) S Sanders | 4 | 5
(Australia) J Moore | 4 | 6 | 1
(Australia) K Birrell | 6 | 4 | 6
WC | (Australia) T Patterson | 3 | 5
8 | (South Korea) S-r Lee | 6 | 7
3 | (Netherlands) C Burger | 4 | 6 | 6
(Australia) A Myers | 6 | 0 | 2
(United States) A Muhammad | 6 | 6
Q | (United States) V Corning | 2 | 2
(Australia) P Hon | 6 | 6
(France) M Arcangioli | 3 | 2
Q | (United States) J Elie | 6 | 6
5 | (China) Y Zhang | 4 | 3

Second round
Q | (United States) J Wacnik | 6 | 7
(Japan) A Okuno | 3 | 5
(Australia) K Birrell | 6 | 7
8 | (South Korea) S-r Lee | 4 | 5
3 | (Netherlands) C Burger | 3 | 2
(United States) A Muhammad | 6 | 6
(Australia) P Hon | 4 | 6 | 5
Q | (United States) J Elie | 6 | 3 | 7

Quarterfinals
Q | (United States) J Wacnik | 2 | 2
(Australia) K Birrell | 6 | 6
(United States) A Muhammad | 7 | 6
Q | (United States) J Elie | 5 | 3

Semifinals
(Australia) K Birrell | 3 | 7^{7} | 2
(United States) A Muhammad | 6 | 6^{2} | 6

=== Bottom half ===
First round
7 | (Russia) N Dzalamidze | 7^{7} | 1 | 6^{10}
WC | (Australia) O Tjandramulia | 6^{3} | 6 | 7^{12}
(United States) L Embree | 6 | 6
PR | (Belarus) I Kremen | 4 | 1
(Hong Kong) L Zhang | 6 | 6
(China) Y Wang | 3 | 3
(Austria) P König | 1 | 4
4 | (Japan) M Eguchi | 6 | 6
6 | (Sweden) S Celik | 6 | 6^{4} | 4
(Australia) Ar Rodionova | 3 | 7^{7} | 6
(Chinese Taipei) C-w Hsu | 2 | 6 | 3
Q | (Australia) D Aiava | 6 | 4 | 6
(United Kingdom) K Dunne | 6^{5} | 2
WC | (Australia) M Inglis | 7^{7} | 6
(Australia) A Bai | 4 | 4
2 | (Japan) E Hozumi | 6 | 6

Second round
WC | (Australia) O Tjandramulia | 4 | 3
(United States) L Embree | 6 | 6
(Hong Kong) L Zhang | 3 | 2
4 | (Japan) M Eguchi | 6 | 6
(Australia) Ar Rodionova | 7^{7} | 6
Q | (Australia) D Aiava | 6^{4} | 2
WC | (Australia) M Inglis | 3 | 5
2 | (Japan) E Hozumi | 6 | 7

Quarterfinals
(United States) L Embree | 2 | 1
4 | (Japan) M Eguchi | 6 | 6
(Australia) Ar Rodionova | 5 | 3
2 | (Japan) E Hozumi | 7 | 6

Semifinals
4 | (Japan) M Eguchi | 4 | 0
2 | (Japan) E Hozumi | 6 | 6
