= 2022 Reinert Open =

Tennis tournament

- Date: 4–10 July 2022
- Edition: 14th
- Category: ITF Women's World Tennis Tour
- Prize money: $100,000
- Surface: Clay / Outdoor
- Location: Versmold, Germany

Champions

Singles
- (Czech Republic) Linda Nosková

Doubles
- (Kazakhstan) Anna Danilina / (Netherlands) Arianne Hartono
← 2021 ·	Reinert Open	· 2023 →

The 2022 Reinert Open was a professional tennis tournament played on outdoor clay courts. It was the fourteenth edition of the tournament which was part of the 2022 ITF Women's World Tennis Tour. It took place in Versmold, Germany between 4 and 10 July 2022.

== Champions ==
=== Singles ===
- (Czech Republic) Linda Nosková def. (Belgium) Ysaline Bonaventure, 6–1, 6–3

=== Doubles ===
- (Kazakhstan) Anna Danilina / (Netherlands) Arianne Hartono def. (India) Ankita Raina / (Netherlands) Rosalie van der Hoek, 6–7^{(4–7)}, 6–4, [10–6]

== Singles main draw entrants ==
=== Seeds ===
Country	Player	Rank^{1}	Seed
FRA	Chloé Paquet	106	1
GEO	Ekaterine Gorgodze	114	2
ROU	Irina Bara	122	3
HUN	Réka Luca Jani	134	4
CZE	Linda Nosková	142	5
BEL	Ysaline Bonaventure	144	6
AUT	Julia Grabher	145	7
ROU	Gabriela Lee	149	8

- ^{1} Rankings are as of 27 June 2022.

=== Other entrants ===
The following players received wildcards into the singles main draw:

- (Germany) Mona Barthel
- (Germany) Julia Middendorf
- (Germany) Noma Noha Akugue
- (Germany) Stephanie Wagner

The following players received entry from the qualifying draw:

- Julia Avdeeva
- (Serbia) Tamara Čurović
- (Kazakhstan) Anna Danilina
- (Bulgaria) Dia Evtimova
- Ekaterina Makarova
- (Hungary) Adrienn Nagy
- Ekaterina Reyngold
- (Turkey) İlay Yörük

The following player received entry as a lucky loser:

- (Australia) Alexandra Osborne
