= 2021 Reinert Open =

Tennis tournament

- Date: 26 July–1 August 2021
- Edition: 13th
- Category: ITF Women's World Tennis Tour
- Prize money: $60,000
- Surface: Clay
- Location: Versmold, Germany

Champions

Singles
- (Russia) Elina Avanesyan

Doubles
- (Kazakhstan) Anna Danilina / (Ukraine) Valeriya Strakhova
← 2019 ·	Reinert Open	· 2022 →

The 2021 Reinert Open was a professional women's tennis tournament played on outdoor clay courts. It was the thirteenth edition of the tournament which was part of the 2021 ITF Women's World Tennis Tour. It took place in Versmold, Germany between 26 July and 1 August 2021.

== Singles main-draw entrants ==
=== Seeds ===
Country	Player	Rank^{1}	Seed
GER	Tamara Korpatsch	162	1
ESP	Lara Arruabarrena	192	2
AUT	Julia Grabher	201	3
CHI	Daniela Seguel	224	4
GER	Katharina Gerlach	225	5
USA	Alycia Parks	240	6
NED	Richèl Hogenkamp	241	7
BEL	Marie Benoît	242	8

- ^{1} Rankings are as of 19 July 2021.

=== Other entrants ===
The following players received wildcards into the singles main draw:

- (Germany) Noma Noha Akugue
- (Germany) Nicole Rivkin
- (Germany) Nastasja Schunk
- (Germany) Joëlle Steur

The following players received entry using protected rankings:

- (Australia) Jaimee Fourlis
- (Germany) Katharina Hobgarski
- (Germany) Anna Zaja

The following players received entry from the qualifying draw:

- (Italy) Federica Arcidiacono
- (Latvia) Kamilla Bartone
- (Spain) Jéssica Bouzas Maneiro
- (Italy) Cristiana Ferrando
- (United States) Elizabeth Halbauer
- (Netherlands) Arianne Hartono
- (Germany) Anna Klasen
- (Russia) Ekaterina Makarova

The following player received entry as a lucky loser:

- (Russia) Elina Avanesyan

== Champions ==
=== Singles ===
- (Russia) Elina Avanesyan def. (Italy) Federica Di Sarra, 6–7^{(4–7)}, 6–2, 6–2

=== Doubles ===
- (Kazakhstan) Anna Danilina / (Ukraine) Valeriya Strakhova def. (Sweden) Mirjam Björklund / (Australia) Jaimee Fourlis, 4–6, 7–5, [10–4]
