= 2015 Canberra Tennis International – Women's doubles =

Women's doubles
- 2015 Canberra Tennis International

Final
- Champions: (Japan) Misa Eguchi (Japan) Eri Hozumi
- Runners-up: (United States) Lauren Embree (United States) Asia Muhammad
- Score: 7–6^{(15–13)}, 1–6, [14–12]

Events
Singles	men	women
Doubles	men	women
← 2014 ·	Canberra Tennis International	· 2016 →

This was a new event in the ITF Women's Circuit.

Misa Eguchi and Eri Hozumi won the inaugural title, defeating Lauren Embree and Asia Muhammad in the final, 7–6^{(15–13)}, 1–6, [14–12].

== Seeds ==
1. (Japan) Misa Eguchi / (Japan) Eri Hozumi (champions)
2. (Australia) Jessica Moore / (Australia) Storm Sanders (semifinals)
3. (Netherlands) Cindy Burger / (Japan) Ayaka Okuno (quarterfinals)
4. (United States) Lauren Embree / (United States) Asia Muhammad (final)

== Draw ==
=== Key ===
- Q = Qualifier
- WC = Wild card
- LL = Lucky loser
- Alt = Alternate
- SE = Special exempt
- PR = Protected ranking
- ITF = ITF entry
- JE = Junior exempt
- w/o = Walkover
- r = Retired
- d = Defaulted
- SR = Special ranking

First round
1	(Japan) M Eguchi (Japan) E Hozumi	6	7
(Australia) P Hon (Australia) T Patterson	1	5
(Australia) K Birrell (Australia) M Inglis	7	6
Q	(Australia) K McPhee (Australia) K Staines	5	4
3	(Netherlands) C Burger (Japan) A Okuno	6^{7}	6	[10]
Q	(Australia) D Aiava (Australia) O Tjandramulia	7^{9}	2	[8]
(Australia) A Bai (Hong Kong) L Zhang	6	6
(Australia) N Bains (United States) J Elie	2	2
(Austria) P König (Australia) A Myers	6	6
(United States) V Corning (United States) J Wacnik	2	3
(France) M Arcangioli (United Kingdom) K Dunne	6^{2}	6	[7]
4	(United States) L Embree (United States) A Muhammad	7^{7}	3	[10]
(United States) Y Chiang (Chinese Taipei) C-w Hsu	6	6
(South Korea) S-r Lee (China) Y Wang	1	1
(Russia) N Dzalamidze (Belarus) I Kremen	6	4	[6]
2	(Australia) J Moore (Australia) S Sanders	2	6	[10]

Quarterfinals
1	(Japan) M Eguchi (Japan) E Hozumi	6	6
(Australia) K Birrell (Australia) M Inglis	4	4
3	(Netherlands) C Burger (Japan) A Okuno	4	3
(Australia) A Bai (Hong Kong) L Zhang	6	6
(Austria) P König (Australia) A Myers	3	4
4	(United States) L Embree (United States) A Muhammad	6	6
(United States) Y Chiang (Chinese Taipei) C-w Hsu	3	2
2	(Australia) J Moore (Australia) S Sanders	6	6

Semifinals
1	(Japan) M Eguchi (Japan) E Hozumi	6	7^{7}
(Australia) A Bai (Hong Kong) L Zhang	2	6^{3}
4	(United States) L Embree (United States) A Muhammad	6	7^{7}
2	(Australia) J Moore (Australia) S Sanders	4	6^{3}

Final
1	(Japan) M Eguchi (Japan) E Hozumi	7^{15}	1	[14]
4	(United States) L Embree (United States) A Muhammad	6^{13}	6	[12]
