= 2015 Canberra Tennis International – Men's doubles =

Men's doubles
- 2015 Canberra Tennis International

Final
- Champions: (Australia) Alex Bolt (Australia) Andrew Whittington
- Runners-up: (United Kingdom) Brydan Klein (Australia) Dane Propoggia
- Score: 7–6^{(7–2)}, 6–3

Events
Singles	men	women
Doubles	men	women
- Canberra Tennis International

Alex Bolt and Andrew Whittington won the title, beating Brydan Klein and Dane Propoggia 7–6^{(7–2)}, 6–3

== Seeds ==
1. (Australia) Alex Bolt / (Australia) Andrew Whittington (champions)
2. (United Kingdom) Brydan Klein / (Australia) Dane Propoggia (final)
3. (Australia) Matt Reid / (United States) Connor Smith (first round)
4. (Australia) Maverick Banes / (Australia) Gavin van Peperzeel (quarterfinals)

== Draw ==
Key

- Q = Qualifier
- WC = Wild card
- LL = Lucky loser
- Alt = Alternate
- ITF = ITF entry
- PR = Protected ranking
- SR = Special ranking
- SE = Special exempt
- JE = Junior exempt
- JR = Junior Accelerator Programme entrant
- CO = College Accelerator Programme entrant
- NG = Next Gen Accelerator Program entrant
- w/o = Walkover
- r = Retired
- d = Defaulted

=== Draw ===
First round
1	(Australia) A Bolt (Australia) A Whittington	5	6	[10]
(Australia) B Mitchell (Australia) J Thompson	7	3	[6]
(Australia) Jacob Grills (Australia) B Mott	6	6
(Australia) Daniel Hobart (Australia) S Puodziunas	4	3
3	(Australia) M Reid (United States) C Smith	6^{5}	4
(Australia) O Jasika (Australia) B Mousley	7^{7}	6
(Australia) M Matosevic (Czech Republic) Robin Stanek	6^{4}	6	[5]
WC	(Australia) H Bourchier (Australia) J Frawley	7^{7}	4	[10]
(Australia) S de Waard (Australia) M Polmans	6	6
WC	(Australia) M Barton (Australia) Bosko Novakovic	2	2
WC	(Australia) A Taylor (Australia) J Taylor	3	2
4	(Australia) M Banes (Australia) Gavin van Peperzeel	6	6
(Australia) Jake Eames (Australia) C O'Connell	4	0
(Australia) O Anderson (Australia) C Puttergill	6	6
(United States) M Giron (United States) N Meister	5	3
2	(United Kingdom) B Klein (Australia) D Propoggia	7	6

Quarterfinals
1	(Australia) A Bolt (Australia) A Whittington	6	6
(Australia) J Grills (Australia) B Mott	0	2
(Australia) O Jasika (Australia) B Mousley	6	6
WC	(Australia) H Bourchier (Australia) J Frawley	4	2
WC	(Australia) S de Waard (Australia) M Polmans	6	6^{4}	[8]
4	(Australia) M Banes (Australia) G van Peperzeel	3	7^{7}	[10]
(Australia) O Anderson (Australia) C Puttergill	1	2
2	(United Kingdom) B Klein (Australia) D Propoggia	6	6

Semifinals
1	(Australia) A Bolt (Australia) A Whittington	6	6
(Australia) O Jasika (Australia) B Mousley	2	1
4	(Australia) M Banes (Australia) G van Peperzeel	3	4
2	(United Kingdom) B Klein (Australia) D Propoggia	6	6

Final
1	(Australia) A Bolt (Australia) A Whittington	7^{7}	6
2	(United Kingdom) B Klein (Australia) D Propoggia	6^{2}	3
