= 2021 ITF World Tennis Tour Maspalomas – Doubles =

Doubles
- 2021 ITF World Tennis Tour Maspalomas

Final
- Champions: (Netherlands) Arianne Hartono (Australia) Olivia Tjandramulia
- Runners-up: (Argentina) María Lourdes Carlé (Argentina) Julieta Estable
- Score: 6–4, 2–6, [10–7]

Events
Singles	Doubles
ITF World Tennis Tour Maspalomas	· 2022 →

This was the first edition of the tournament.

Arianne Hartono and Olivia Tjandramulia won the title, defeating María Lourdes Carlé and Julieta Estable in the final, 6–4, 2–6, [10–7].

== Seeds ==
1. (Chile) Bárbara Gatica / (Brazil) Rebeca Pereira (first round)
2. (Netherlands) Arianne Hartono / (Australia) Olivia Tjandramulia (champions)
3. (Russia) Alina Charaeva / (Russia) Maria Timofeeva (quarterfinals, withdrew)
4. (United Kingdom) Freya Christie / (Japan) Yuriko Lily Miyazaki (semifinals)

== Draw ==
=== Key ===
- Q = Qualifier
- WC = Wild card
- LL = Lucky loser
- Alt = Alternate
- SE = Special exempt
- PR = Protected ranking
- ITF = ITF entry
- JE = Junior exempt
- w/o = Walkover
- r = Retired
- d = Defaulted
- SR = Special ranking

=== Draw ===
First round
1	(Chile) B Gatica (Brazil) R Pereira	6^{8}	4
(Argentina) ML Carlé (Argentina) J Estable	7^{10}	6
(Netherlands) N Liauw A Fong (Russia) E Maklakova	6	6
(Italy) F Prati (Bulgaria) A Vangelova	0	1
4	(United Kingdom) F Christie (Japan) YL Miyazaki	6	3	[10]
(Ukraine) V Dema (France) C Monnet	2	6	[3]
(Denmark) O Gram (South Korea) S-h Park	5	6	[12]
(Andorra) V Jiménez Kasintseva (Netherlands) A Rus	7	3	[10]
(Italy) M Caregaro (Germany) A Zaja	7	1	[5]
(Romania) K Bejenaru (Romania) IG Ghioroaie	5	6	[10]
(Poland) W Foryś (United States) E Oosterhout	2	4
3	(Russia) A Charaeva (Russia) M Timofeeva	6	6
(Bosnia and Herzegovina) D Herdželaš (Bulgaria) J Stamatova	6	4	[12]
(Bulgaria) D Evtimova (Italy) N Fossa Huergo	1	6	[10]
(Spain) J Bouzas Maneiro (Spain) L Romero Gormaz
2	(Netherlands) A Hartono (Australia) O Tjandramulia	w/o

Quarterfinals
(Argentina) ML Carlé (Argentina) J Estable	6	5	[10]
(Netherlands) N Liauw A Fong (Russia) E Maklakova	2	7	[8]
4	(United Kingdom) F Christie (Japan) YL Miyazaki	6	6
(Denmark) O Gram (South Korea) S-h Park	2	4
(Romania) K Bejenaru (Romania) IG Ghioroaie	w/o
3	(Russia) A Charaeva (Russia) M Timofeeva
(Bosnia and Herzegovina) D Herdželaš (Bulgaria) J Stamatova	3	2
2	(Netherlands) A Hartono (Australia) O Tjandramulia	6	6

Semifinals
(Argentina) ML Carlé (Argentina) J Estable	6	6
4	(United Kingdom) F Christie (Japan) YL Miyazaki	3	4
(Romania) K Bejenaru (Romania) IG Ghioroaie	4	5
2	(Netherlands) A Hartono (Australia) O Tjandramulia	6	7

Final
(Argentina) ML Carlé (Argentina) J Estable	4	6	[7]
2	(Netherlands) A Hartono (Australia) O Tjandramulia	6	2	[10]
