= 2015 Canberra Tennis International – Men's singles =

Men's singles
- 2015 Canberra Tennis International

Final
- Champion: (Australia) Benjamin Mitchell
- Runner-up: (Australia) Luke Saville
- Score: 5–7, 6–0, 6–1

Events
Singles	men	women
Doubles	men	women
Canberra Tennis International	· 2016 →

Benjamin Mitchell won the title, beating Luke Saville 5–7, 6–0, 6–1

== Seeds ==
1. (Australia) John Millman (second round)
2. (Australia) Matthew Ebden (second round)
3. (Australia) Jordan Thompson (second round)
4. (United Kingdom) Brydan Klein (second round)
5. (Australia) Luke Saville (final)
6. (United States) Connor Smith (second round)
7. (China) Li Zhe (quarterfinals)
8. (Australia) Alex Bolt (quarterfinals)

== Draw ==
=== Key ===
- Q = Qualifier
- WC = Wild card
- LL = Lucky loser
- Alt = Alternate
- SE = Special exempt
- PR = Protected ranking
- ITF = ITF entry
- JE = Junior exempt
- w/o = Walkover
- r = Retired
- d = Defaulted
- SR = Special ranking

=== Finals ===
Semifinals
5	(Australia) Luke Saville	6	6
(Czech Republic) Robin Staněk	2	1
(Australia) Matt Reid	3	2
(Australia) Benjamin Mitchell	6	6

Final
5	(Australia) Luke Saville	7	0	1
(Australia) Benjamin Mitchell	5	6	6

=== Top half ===
First round
1	(Australia) J Millman	6	6
Q	(Australia) B Mott	1	0
(United States) M Giron	7^{7}	6
(New Zealand) J Statham	6^{3}	3
WC	(Australia) B Mousley	6^{5}	3
Q	(Australia) O Anderson	7^{7}	6
(United States) N Meister	4	6^{3}
5	(Australia) L Saville	6	7^{7}
3	(Australia) J Thompson	6	2	6
(Australia) M Matosevic	2	6	4
(New Zealand) F Tearney	6^{3}	5
(Czech Republic) Robin Staněk	7^{7}	7
Q	(Germany) S Fanselow	6	6
WC	(Australia) C O'Connell	1	1
WC	(Australia) H Bourchier	7	3	3
6	(United States) Connor Smith	5	6	6

Second round
1	(Australia) J Millman	4	4
(United States) M Giron	6	6
Q	(Australia) O Anderson	4	4
5	(Australia) L Saville	6	6
3	(Australia) J Thompson	0	2
(Czech Republic) R Staněk	6	6
Q	(Germany) S Fanselow	4	6	7^{7}
6	(United States) C Smith	6	3	6^{5}

Quarterfinals
(United States) M Giron	4	6	6^{1}
5	(Australia) L Saville	6	1	7^{7}
(Czech Republic) R Staněk	6	7^{7}
Q	(Germany) S Fanselow	4	6^{3}

Semifinals
5	(Australia) L Saville	6	6
(Czech Republic) R Staněk	2	1

=== Bottom half ===
First round
7	(China) Z Li	6	6
Q	(Australia) J Delaney	4	2
(Australia) Gavin van Peperzeel	7^{7}	6
(Australia) A Whittington	6^{4}	3
(Australia) M Reid	7	6
LL	(Australia) Daniel Hobart	5	4
PR	(Australia) G Jones	3	2
4	(United Kingdom) B Klein	6	6
8	(Australia) A Bolt	6	7
WC	(Australia) Jacob Grills	3	5
(Australia) M Banes	2	6^{4}
(Australia) M Barton	6	7^{7}
(Australia) D Propoggia	1	0^{r}
(Australia) B Mitchell	6	3
(Australia) O Jasika	4	1
2	(Australia) M Ebden	6	6

Second round
7	(China) Z Li	6	2	6
(Australia) G van Peperzeel	3	6	4
(Australia) M Reid	6	6
4	(United Kingdom) B Klein	2	4
8	(Australia) A Bolt	6	7^{7}
(Australia) M Barton	4	6^{3}
(Australia) B Mitchell	6^{6}	6	6
2	(Australia) M Ebden	7^{8}	4	2

Quarterfinals
7	(China) Z Li	6^{4}	2
(Australia) M Reid	7^{7}	6
8	(Australia) A Bolt	4	2
(Australia) B Mitchell	6	6

Semifinals
(Australia) M Reid	3	2
(Australia) B Mitchell	6	6
