= 2021 ITF World Tennis Tour Gran Canaria – Doubles =

Doubles
- 2021 ITF World Tennis Tour Gran Canaria

Final
- Champions: (Russia) Elina Avanesyan (Russia) Oksana Selekhmeteva
- Runners-up: (Netherlands) Arianne Hartono (Australia) Olivia Tjandramulia
- Score: 7–5, 6–2

Events
Singles	Doubles
ITF World Tennis Tour Gran Canaria	· 2022 →

This was the first edition of the tournament.

Elina Avanesyan and Oksana Selekhmeteva won the title, defeating Arianne Hartono and Olivia Tjandramulia in the final, 7–5, 6–2.

== Seeds ==
1. (Spain) Rebeka Masarova / (Netherlands) Arantxa Rus (semifinals)
2. (Chile) Bárbara Gatica / (Brazil) Rebeca Pereira (first round)
3. (Netherlands) Richèl Hogenkamp / (Mexico) Ana Sofía Sánchez (first round)
4. (Netherlands) Arianne Hartono / (Australia) Olivia Tjandramulia (final)

== Draw ==
=== Key ===
- Q = Qualifier
- WC = Wild card
- LL = Lucky loser
- Alt = Alternate
- SE = Special exempt
- PR = Protected ranking
- ITF = ITF entry
- JE = Junior exempt
- w/o = Walkover
- r = Retired
- d = Defaulted
- SR = Special ranking

=== Draw ===
First round
1	(Spain) R Masarova (Netherlands) A Rus	6	6
WC	(Denmark) O Gram (South Korea) S-h Park	4	1
(Spain) M Bassols Ribera (France) D Parry	6	6
(Argentina) ML Carlé (Spain) E Pérez Somarriba	1	0
4	(Netherlands) A Hartono (Australia) O Tjandramulia	6	6
WC	(Spain) C Hoste Ferrer (Spain) L Romero Gormaz	1	0
(Russia) A Charaeva (Russia) M Timofeeva	6	6
(Spain) J Bouzas Maneiro (Spain) L Cortez Llorca	1	2
(Italy) M Colmegna (Italy) N Fossa Huergo	4	2
Alt	(Romania) K Bejenaru (Romania) IG Ghioroaie	6	6
(Russia) E Avanesyan (Russia) O Selekhmeteva	6	6
3	(Netherlands) R Hogenkamp (Mexico) AS Sánchez	2	2
(Portugal) F Jorge (Russia) E Shalimova	4	5
(Bulgaria) D Evtimova (Austria) J Grabher	6	7
(Spain) G Maristany (Chile) D Seguel	3	7^{7}	[10]
2	(Chile) B Gatica (Brazil) R Pereira	6	6^{4}	[5]

Quarterfinals
1	(Spain) R Masarova (Netherlands) A Rus	7	7^{7}
(Spain) M Bassols Ribera (France) D Parry	5	6^{4}
4	(Netherlands) A Hartono (Australia) O Tjandramulia	6	7^{7}
(Russia) A Charaeva (Russia) M Timofeeva	4	6^{1}
Alt	(Romania) K Bejenaru (Romania) IG Ghioroaie	4	7^{7}	[8]
(Russia) E Avanesyan (Russia) O Selekhmeteva	6	6^{2}	[10]
(Bulgaria) D Evtimova (Austria) J Grabher	6	6
(Spain) G Maristany (Chile) D Seguel	2	2

Semifinals
1	(Spain) R Masarova (Netherlands) A Rus	2	2
4	(Netherlands) A Hartono (Australia) O Tjandramulia	6	6
(Russia) E Avanesyan (Russia) O Selekhmeteva	6	6
(Bulgaria) D Evtimova (Austria) J Grabher	1	3

Final
4	(Netherlands) A Hartono (Australia) O Tjandramulia	5	2
(Russia) E Avanesyan (Russia) O Selekhmeteva	7	6
