= 2022 Reinert Open – Doubles =

Doubles
- 2022 Reinert Open

Final
- Champions: (Kazakhstan) Anna Danilina (Netherlands) Arianne Hartono
- Runners-up: (India) Ankita Raina (Netherlands) Rosalie van der Hoek
- Score: 6–7^{(4–7)}, 6–4, [10–6]

Events
Singles	Doubles
← 2021 ·	Reinert Open	· 2023 →

Anna Danilina and Valeriya Strakhova were the defending champions but Strakhova chose not to participate. Danilina partnered alongside Arianne Hartono and successfully defend her title, defeating Ankita Raina and Rosalie van der Hoek in the final, 6–7^{(4–7)}, 6–4, [10–6].

== Seeds ==
1. (Kazakhstan) Anna Danilina / (Netherlands) Arianne Hartono (champions)
2. (India) Ankita Raina / (Netherlands) Rosalie van der Hoek (final)
3. (Brazil) Rebeca Pereira / (Chile) Daniela Seguel (first round)
4. (Japan) Nao Hibino / (Australia) Alexandra Osborne (first round, withdrew)

== Draw ==
Key

- Q = Qualifier
- WC = Wild card
- LL = Lucky loser
- Alt = Alternate
- ITF = ITF entry
- PR = Protected ranking
- SR = Special ranking
- SE = Special exempt
- JE = Junior exempt
- JR = Junior Accelerator Programme entrant
- CO = College Accelerator Programme entrant
- NG = Next Gen Accelerator Program entrant
- w/o = Walkover
- r = Retired
- d = Defaulted

=== Draw ===
First round
(Bulgaria) D Evtimova (Bulgaria) J Terziyska	2	1
(Serbia) T Čurović (United States) C Scholl	6	6
4	(Japan) N Hibino (Australia) A Osborne
E Makarova; E Reyngold	w/o
(United Kingdom) E Appleton (India) P Thombare	6	6
(Germany) V Sandberg (Netherlands) A Verhaar	1	3
(Germany) A Lazar (Germany) S Zhiyenbayeva	3	1
(Brazil) C Alves (Brazil) G Cé	6	6
(Hungary) RL Jani (Hungary) A Nagy	6	6
3	(Brazil) R Pereira (Chile) D Seguel	3	4
(Germany) M Barthel (Germany) J Middendorf	4	3
A Anshba (Andorra) V Jiménez Kasintseva	6	6
(Germany) L Meyer auf der Heide (Germany) A Wirges	6^{2}	6	[6]
2	(India) A Raina (Netherlands) R van der Hoek	7^{7}	4	[10]

Quarterfinals
1	(Kazakhstan) A Danilina (Netherlands) A Hartono	6	7
(Serbia) T Čurović (United States) C Scholl	1	5
E Makarova; E Reyngold	3	3
(United Kingdom) E Appleton (India) P Thombare	6	6
(Brazil) C Alves (Brazil) G Cé
(Hungary) RL Jani (Hungary) A Nagy	w/o
A Anshba (Andorra) V Jiménez Kasintseva	3	4
2	(India) A Raina (Netherlands) R van der Hoek	6	6

Semifinals
1	(Kazakhstan) A Danilina (Netherlands) A Hartono	6	6
(United Kingdom) E Appleton (India) P Thombare	3	3
(Hungary) RL Jani (Hungary) A Nagy	6	1	[6]
2	(India) A Raina (Netherlands) R van der Hoek	4	6	[10]

Final
1	(Kazakhstan) A Danilina (Netherlands) A Hartono	6^{4}	6	[10]
2	(India) A Raina (Netherlands) R van der Hoek	7^{7}	4	[6]
