= Ángela Fita Boluda =

Spanish tennis player (born 1999)

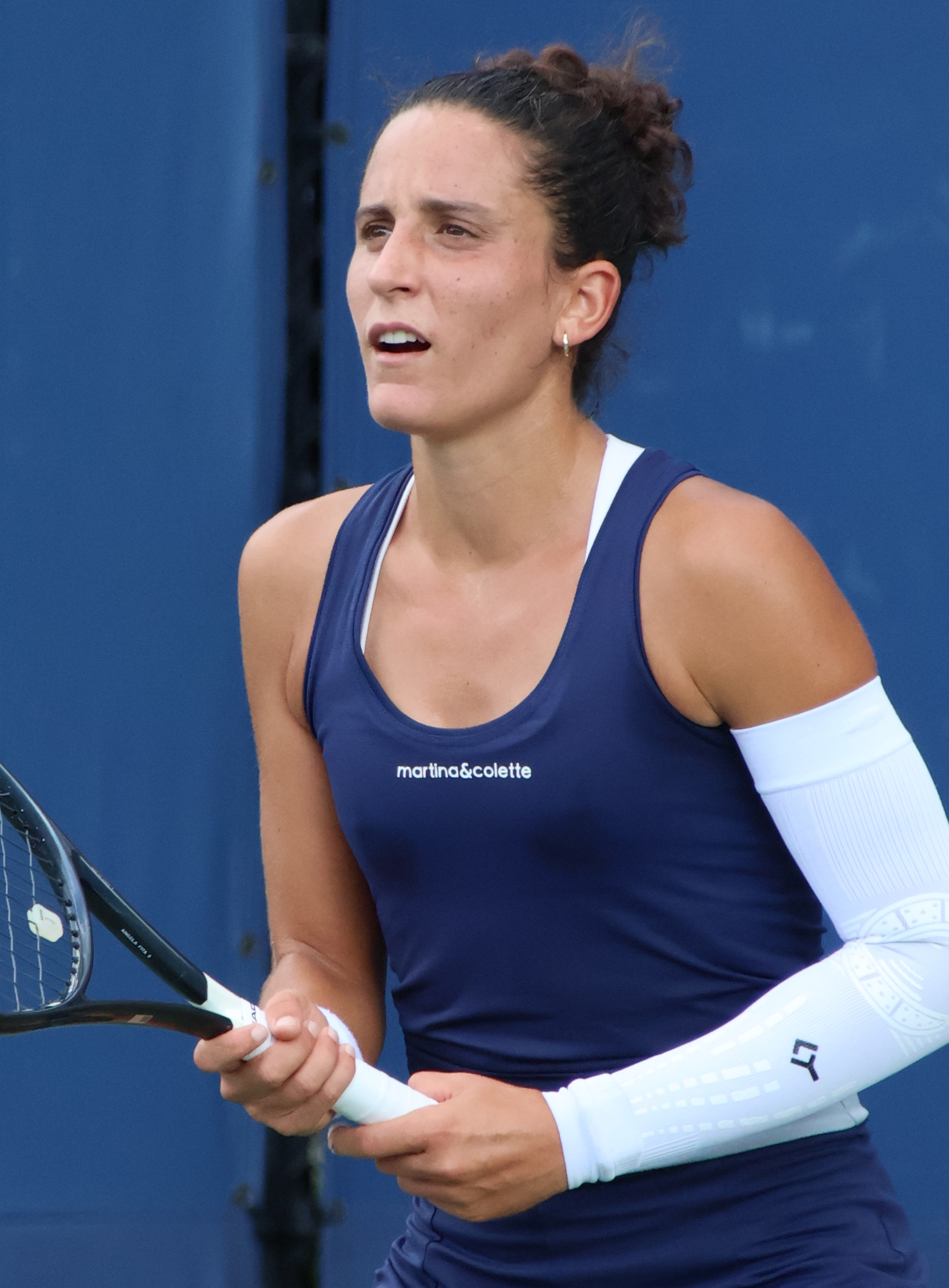
- Fita Boluda at the 2026 US Open
- Country (sports): Spain
- Born: 12 July 1999 (age 27)
- Height: 1.76 m (5 ft 9 in)
- Plays: Left-handed
- Prize money: $235,385

Singles
- Career record: 350–227
- Career titles: 10 ITF
- Highest ranking: No. 190 (4 May 2026)
- Current ranking: No. 212 (24 August 2026)

Grand Slam singles results
- Wimbledon: Q1 (2026)
- US Open: Q2 (2026)

Doubles
- Career record: 220–110
- Career titles: 28 ITF
- Highest ranking: No. 150 (8 September 2025)
- Current ranking: No. 187 (25 May 2026)
- Last updated on: 31 May 2026.

Ángela Fita Boluda (born 12 July 1999) is a Spanish tennis player. She has a career-high singles ranking by the WTA of 190, achieved on 4 May 2026, and a highest doubles ranking of No. 150, achieved on 8 September 2025.

Fita Boluda has won ten singles titles and 28 doubles titles on the ITF Women's Circuit.

== Career ==
She made her WTA Tour debut 2023 at the Rabat Grand Prix as a lucky loser but was defeated in the first round by Leylah Fernandez.

== WTA 125 finals ==
=== Doubles: 1 (runner-up) ===
| Result | W–L | Date | Tournament | Surface | Partner | Opponents | Score |
|---|---|---|---|---|---|---|---|
| Loss | 0–1 | Jun 2025 | Internacional de Valencia, Spain | Clay | (Spain) Yvonne Cavallé Reimers | (Russia) Maria Kozyreva (Belarus) Iryna Shymanovich | 3–6, 4–6 |

== ITF Circuit finals ==
=== Singles: 14 (10 titles, 4 runner-ups) ===
Legend
W100 tournaments (1–0)
W60 tournaments (1–0)
W35 tournaments (3–4)
W15 tournaments (5–0)

| Result | W–L | Date | Tournament | Tier | Surface | Opponent | Score |
|---|---|---|---|---|---|---|---|
| Win | 1–0 | Aug 2019 | ITF Tabarka, Tunisia | W15 | Clay | (Romania) Oana Gavrilă | 5–7, 6–4, 6–4 |
| Win | 2–0 | Sep 2019 | ITF Melilla, Spain | W15 | Clay | (United Kingdom) Ali Collins | 6–3, 6–4 |
| Win | 3–0 | Jun 2022 | Internazionali di Brescia, Italy | W60 | Clay | (Greece) Despina Papamichail | 6–2, 6–0 |
| Win | 4–0 | Apr 2023 | ITF Telde, Spain | W15 | Clay | (Lithuania) Klaudija Bubelytė | 3–6, 7–5, 7–5 |
| Win | 5–0 | Nov 2023 | ITF Castellón, Spain | W15 | Clay | (Spain) Ariana Geerlings | 6–4, 7–6^{(5)} |
| Win | 6–0 | Nov 2023 | ITF Nules, Spain | W15 | Clay | (Germany) Mina Hodzic | 6–4, 6–3 |
| Win | 7–0 | Feb 2024 | ITF Antalya, Turkey | W35 | Clay | (Italy) Martina Colmegna | 6–0, 6–2 |
| Loss | 7–1 | Jul 2024 | ITF Darmstadt, Germany | W35 | Clay | (Canada) Victoria Mboko | 4–6, 4–6 |
| Win | 8–1 | Feb 2025 | ITF Antalya, Turkey | W35 | Clay | (Slovakia) Nina Vargová | 6–3, 6–4 |
| Win | 9–1 | Aug 2025 | ITF Brașov, Romania | W35 | Clay | (Czech Republic) Julie Štruplová | 7–5, 6–4 |
| Loss | 9–2 | Jan 2026 | ITF Antalya, Turkiye | W35 | Clay | (Russia) Darya Astakhova | 1–6, 6–4, 4–6 |
| Loss | 9–3 | Mar 2026 | ITF San Gregorio, Italy | W35 | Clay | (France) Alice Tubello | 2–6, 3–6 |
| Loss | 9–4 | Apr 2026 | Florida's Sports Coast Open, US | W35 | Clay | (United States) Akasha Urhobo | 5–7, 4–6 |
| Win | 10–4 | Apr 2026 | Bonita Springs Championship, US | W100 | Clay | (United States) Akasha Urhobo | 6–3, 6–1 |

=== Doubles: 46 (28 titles, 18 runner-ups) ===
Legend
W100 tournaments (0–2)
W80 tournaments (0–1)
W60/75 tournaments (2–3)
W40/50 tournaments (2–2)
W25/35 tournaments (11–5)
W10/15 tournaments (13–5)

| Result | W–L | Date | Tournament | Tier | Surface | Partner | Opponents | Score |
|---|---|---|---|---|---|---|---|---|
| Win | 1–0 | Aug 2016 | ITF Valladolid, Spain | W10 | Hard | (Australia) Isabelle Wallace | (Spain) Arabela Fernández Rabener (Spain) Ana Román Domínguez | 6–1, 6–1 |
| Loss | 1–1 | Sep 2017 | ITF Melilla, Spain | W15 | Clay | (Spain) Noelia Bouzó Zanotti | (Spain) Eva Guerrero Álvarez (Spain) Paula Arias Manjón | 6–4, 4–6, [3–10] |
| Loss | 1–2 | Oct 2017 | ITF Riba-roja de Túria, Spain | W15 | Clay | (Spain) Estrella Cabeza Candela | (Spain) Yvonne Cavallé Reimers (Argentina) Guadalupe Pérez Rojas | 4–6, 4–6 |
| Win | 2–2 | Apr 2018 | ITF Óbidos, Portugal | W25 | Carpet | (Spain) Estrella Cabeza Candela | (United Kingdom) Freya Christie (Belgium) An-Sophie Mestach | 7–6^{(3)}, 1–6, [10–6] |
| Win | 3–2 | Jul 2018 | ITF Getxo, Spain | W25 | Clay | (Spain) Yvonne Cavallé Reimers | (Spain) Marina Bassols Ribera (Spain) Guiomar Maristany | 6–3, 6–2 |
| Loss | 3–3 | Jul 2018 | ITF Don Benito, Spain | W15 | Carpet | (Spain) Noelia Bouzó Zanotti | (Spain) Marina Bassols Ribera (Germany) Irina Cantos Siemers | 1–6, 2–6 |
| Win | 4–3 | Aug 2018 | ITF Sezze, Italy | W15 | Clay | (Spain) Noelia Bouzó Zanotti | (Italy) Costanza Traversi (Italy) Aurora Zantedeschi | 6–3, 6–1 |
| Loss | 4–4 | Oct 2018 | ITF Riba-roja de Túria, Spain | W25 | Clay | (Spain) Marina Bassols Ribera | (Spain) Aliona Bolsova (Greece) Despina Papamichail | 2–6, 2–6 |
| Win | 5–4 | Apr 2019 | ITF Tabarka, Tunisia | W15 | Clay | (France) Alice Ramé | (United States) Sarah Lee (Belgium) Chelsea Vanhoutte | 7–5, 6–7^{(5)}, [11–9] |
| Win | 6–4 | Apr 2019 | ITF Tabarka, Tunisia | W15 | Clay | (United Kingdom) Amanda Carreras | (United States) Sarah Lee (Belgium) Chelsea Vanhoutte | 6–2, 6–3 |
| Win | 7–4 | May 2019 | ITF Tabarka, Tunisia | W15 | Clay | (Czech Republic) Gabriela Horáčková | (Italy) Verena Hofer (Italy) Irene Lavino | 6–2, 6–3 |
| Loss | 7–5 | Jul 2019 | ITF Vitoria-Gasteiz, Spain | W25 | Hard | (Spain) Alba Carrillo Marín | (Mexico) Victoria Rodríguez (Mexico) Ana Sofía Sánchez | 3–6, 3–6 |
| Win | 8–5 | Aug 2019 | ITF Tabarka, Tunisia | W15 | Clay | (Romania) Oana Gavrilă | (Serbia) Elena Milovanović (Italy) Anna Turati | 6–3, 4–6, [10–5] |
| Loss | 8–6 | Sep 2019 | ITF Melilla, Spain | W15 | Clay | (Spain) Olga Parres Azcoitia | (Russia) Daria Mishina (Russia) Anna Morgina | 1–6, 7–6^{(2)}, [6–10] |
| Win | 9–6 | Feb 2020 | ITF Palmanova, Spain | W15 | Clay | (Spain) Yvonne Cavallé Reimers | (Spain) Celia Cerviño Ruiz (Spain) María Gutiérrez Carrasco | 6–2, 7–6^{(5)} |
| Win | 10–6 | Sep 2020 | ITF Marbella, Spain | W15 | Clay | (Spain) Yvonne Cavallé Reimers | (Czech Republic) Anna Sisková (Sweden) Caijsa Hennemann | 7–6^{(1)} 6–4 |
| Win | 11–6 | Dec 2020 | ITF Madrid, Spain | W15 | Clay (i) | (Russia) Oksana Selekhmeteva | (Chile) Bárbara Gatica (Brazil) Rebeca Pereira | 7–6^{(4)}, 1–6, [10–5] |
| Win | 12–6 | Jan 2021 | ITF Manacor, Spain | W15 | Hard | (Russia) Oksana Selekhmeteva | (Switzerland) Ylena In-Albon (Switzerland) Valentina Ryser | 6–1, 4–6, [10–5] |
| Loss | 12–7 | Jan 2021 | ITF Manacor, Spain | W15 | Hard | (Russia) Oksana Selekhmeteva | (Switzerland) Ylena In-Albon (Italy) Camilla Rosatello | 6–7^{(3)}, 7–6^{(9)}, [5–10] |
| Win | 13–7 | Jan 2021 | ITF Villena, Spain | 1W15 | Hard | (Spain) Alba Carrillo Marín | (Netherlands) Eva Vedder (Netherlands) Stéphanie Visscher | 7–5, 7–5 |
| Win | 14–7 | Mar 2021 | ITF Manacor, Spain | W15 | Hard | (Russia) Oksana Selekhmeteva | (Switzerland) Ylena In-Albon (Spain) Rebeka Masarova | 6–2, 5–7, [10–8] |
| Win | 15–7 | Sep 2021 | ITF Marbella, Spain | W25 | Clay | (Spain) Yvonne Cavallé Reimers | (Canada) Bianca Fernandez (Spain) Ana Lantigua de la Nuez | 6–3, 6–2 |
| Loss | 15–8 | Sep 2021 | Open de Valencia, Spain | W80 | Clay | (Russia) Oksana Selekhmeteva | (Belgium) Ysaline Bonaventure (Georgia (country)) Ekaterine Gorgodze | 2–6, 6–2, [6–10] |
| Win | 16–8 | Oct 2021 | ITF Lisbon, Portugal | W25 | Clay | (Spain) Yvonne Cavallé Reimers | (Argentina) Paula Ormaechea (Serbia) Natalija Stevanović | 3–6, 6–3, [10–4] |
| Win | 17–8 | May 2022 | ITF Platja d'Aro, Spain | W25 | Clay | (Venezuela) Andrea Gámiz | (Netherlands) Isabelle Haverlag (Ukraine) Valeriya Strakhova | 6–4, 3–6, [10–3] |
| Win | 18–8 | Jul 2022 | ITF Stuttgart-Vaihingen, Germany | W25 | Clay | (Germany) Emily Seibold | (Poland) Weronika Falkowska (Czech Republic) Anna Sisková | 6–4, 7–6^{(5)} |
| Loss | 18–9 | Jul 2022 | ITF Perugia, Italy | W25 | Clay | (Italy) Angelica Moratelli | (Slovenia) Veronika Erjavec (Ukraine) Valeriya Strakhova | w/o |
| Win | 19–9 | Aug 2022 | ITF San Bartolomé de Tirajana, Spain | W60 | Clay | (Netherlands) Arantxa Rus | (Russia) Elina Avanesyan (Russia) Diana Shnaider | 6–4, 6–4 |
| Loss | 19–10 | Oct 2022 | Open de San Sebastián, Spain | W60 | Clay | (Spain) Guiomar Maristany | (Spain) Aliona Bolsova (Ukraine) Katarina Zavatska | 2–1 ret. |
| Win | 20–10 | Sep 2023 | ITF Ceuta, Spain | W25 | Hard | (Spain) Yvonne Cavallé Reimers | (Serbia) Katarina Kozarov (United States) Madison Sieg | 7–6^{(0)}, 6–3 |
| Loss | 20–11 | Oct 2023 | ITF Baza, Spain | W25 | Hard | (Croatia) Lea Bošković | (Australia) Olivia Gadecki (United Kingdom) Samantha Murray Sharan | 5–7, 6–4, [4-10] |
| Win | 21–11 | Nov 2023 | ITF Nules, Spain | W15 | Clay | (Spain) Yvonne Cavallé Reimers | (Ukraine) Maryna Kolb (Ukraine) Nadiia Kolb | 6–1, 6–2 |
| Loss | 21–12 | Jan 2024 | ITF Antalya, Turkey | W50 | Clay | (Latvia) Daniela Vismane | (Russia) Anastasiia Gureva (Russia) Alexandra Shubladze | 3–6, 2–6 |
| Win | 22–12 | Feb 2024 | ITF Antalya, Turkey | W35 | Clay | (Latvia) Daniela Vismane | (Romania) Cristina Dinu (Ukraine) Oleksandra Oliynykova | 6–4, 6–0 |
| Loss | 22–13 | Feb 2024 | ITF Antalya, Turkey | W35 | Clay | (Latvia) Daniela Vismane | (Italy) Martina Colmegna (France) Alice Ramé | 6–3, 1–6, [11–13] |
| Win | 23–13 | Feb 2024 | ITF Antalya, Turkey | W35 | Clay | (Latvia) Daniela Vismane | (Greece) Martha Matoula (Greece) Dimitra Pavlou | 6–1, 6–3 |
| Loss | 23–14 | Sep 2024 | Lisboa Belém Open, Portugal | W75 | Clay | (Spain) Yvonne Cavallé Reimers | (Portugal) Francisca Jorge (Portugal) Matilde Jorge | 6–7^{(5)}, 4–6 |
| Win | 24–14 | Oct 2024 | ITF Seville, Spain | W35 | Clay | (Switzerland) Ylena In-Albon | (Spain) Aliona Bolsova (Greece) Martha Matoula | 6–2, 6–1 |
| Loss | 24–15 | Jan 2025 | ITF La Marsa, Tunisia | W50 | Hard | (Switzerland) Ylena In-Albon | (China) Guo Meiqi (China) Xiao Zhenghua | 3–6, 4–6 |
| Loss | 24–16 | Apr 2025 | Zaragoza Open, Spain | W100 | Clay | (Spain) Aliona Bolsova | (Australia) Olivia Gadecki (Indonesia) Aldila Sutjiadi | 4–6, 3–6 |
| Loss | 24–17 | Jun 2025 | Internationaux de Blois, France | W75 | Clay | (Brazil) Laura Pigossi | (Chinese Taipei) Cho I-hsuan (Chinese Taipei) Cho Yi-tsen | 5–7, 6–4, [5–10] |
| Win | 25–17 | Aug 2025 | ITF Bistrița, Romania | W50 | Clay | (Switzerland) Ylena In-Albon | (Chinese Taipei) Li Yu-yun; Daria Lodikova | 7–6^{(5)}, 7–5 |
| Win | 26–17 | Feb 2026 | Porto Indoor, Portugal | W50 | Hard (i) | (Switzerland) Ylena In-Albon | (Germany) Noma Noha Akugue (Bosnia and Herzegovina) Anita Wagner | 6–4, 7–6^{(5)} |
| Win | 27–17 | Mar 2026 | ITF Sabadell, Spain | W35 | Clay | (Spain) Aliona Bolsova | (Spain) Lucía Cortez Llorca (Spain) Alicia Herrero Liñana | 6–4, 6–1 |
| Win | 28–17 | Mar 2026 | Zaragoza Open, Spain | W75 | Clay | (Spain) Yvonne Cavallé Reimers | (Belgium) Lara Salden (United States) Ayana Akli | 6–4, 6–4 |
| Loss | 28–18 | Jul 2026 | Ladies Open Amstetten, Austria | W100 | Clay | (Czech Republic) Anna Sisková | (Czech Republic) Aneta Kučmová (Czech Republic) Aneta Laboutková | 1–6, 6–1, [14–16] |
