= ITF World Tennis Tour Gran Canaria =

- 2026 ITF World Tennis Tour Gran Canaria

Women's World Tennis Tour
- Event name: ITF World Tennis Tour Gran Canaria; ITF World Tennis Tour Maspalomas
- Location: Maspalomas, Spain
- Venue: Conde Jackson Tennis Maspalomas
- Category: ITF Women's World Tennis Tour
- Surface: Clay / outdoor
- Draw: 32S/48Q/16D
- Prize money: $100,000
- Website: www.canariastennis.com

The ITF World Tennis Tour Gran Canaria and the ITF World Tennis Tour Maspalomas are two back-to-back tournaments for professional female tennis players played on outdoor clay courts. The events are both classified as $60,000 ITF Women's World Tennis Tour tournaments and have been held in Maspalomas, Spain, since 2021. In 2023, only one event was held and upgraded to $100,000.

== Past finals ==
=== Singles ===
Year	Champion	Runner-up	Score
2025	(Spain) Kaitlin Quevedo	(Netherlands) Arantxa Rus	4–6, 6–2, 6–4
2024	(Spain) Nuria Párrizas Díaz	(Spain) Andrea Lázaro García	6–4, 6–3
2023	(Austria) Julia Grabher (2)	(Spain) Jéssica Bouzas Maneiro	6–4, 6–4
2022 (2)	(Austria) Julia Grabher	(Argentina) Nadia Podoroska	6–4, 6–3
2022 (1)	(Netherlands) Arantxa Rus (3)	Polina Kudermetova	6–3, 3–6, 6–1
2021 (2)	(Netherlands) Arantxa Rus (2)	(Andorra) Victoria Jiménez Kasintseva	6–0, 6–1
2021 (1)	(Netherlands) Arantxa Rus	(Egypt) Mayar Sherif	6–4, 6–2

=== Doubles ===
Year	Champions	Runners-up	Score
2026	(Kazakhstan) Zhibek Kulambayeva (Czech Republic) Anna Sisková (2)	(Czech Republic) Dominika Šalková (Sweden) Lisa Zaar	6–3, 7–6^{(7–3)}
2025	(Belgium) Magali Kempen (Czech Republic) Anna Sisková	(United Kingdom) Madeleine Brooks (Hong Kong) Eudice Chong	6–2, 6–3
2024	(Poland) Katarzyna Piter (Hungary) Fanny Stollár	(Italy) Angelica Moratelli (United States) Sabrina Santamaria	6–4, 6–2
2023	(Hungary) Tímea Babos (Hungary) Anna Bondár	(Spain) Leyre Romero Gormaz (Netherlands) Arantxa Rus	6–4, 3–6, [10–4]
2022 (2)	(Spain) Ángela Fita Boluda (Netherlands) Arantxa Rus	Elina Avanesyan; Diana Shnaider	6–4, 6–4
2022 (1)	(Spain) Jéssica Bouzas Maneiro (Spain) Leyre Romero Gormaz	(Spain) Lucía Cortez Llorca (Spain) Rosa Vicens Mas	1–6, 7–5, [10–6]
2021 (2)	(Netherlands) Arianne Hartono (Australia) Olivia Tjandramulia	(Argentina) María Lourdes Carlé (Argentina) Julieta Estable	6–4, 2–6, [10–7]
2021 (1)	(Russia) Elina Avanesyan (Russia) Oksana Selekhmeteva	(Netherlands) Arianne Hartono (Australia) Olivia Tjandramulia	7–5, 6–2
