= Paula Arias Manjón =

Spanish tennis player (born 2000)

- Country (sports): Spain
- Residence: Ávila, Spain
- Born: 26 February 2000 (age 26)
- Plays: Right-handed (two handed-backhand)
- Prize money: $38,217

Singles
- Career record: 128–111
- Career titles: 1 ITF
- Highest ranking: No. 681 (22 April 2024)

Doubles
- Career record: 44–32
- Career titles: 3 ITF
- Highest ranking: No. 592 (24 September 2018)
- Last updated on: 13 July 2026.

Paula Arias Manjón (born 26 February 2000) is a Spanish inactive tennis player.

Arias Manjón won the 2016 French Open girls' doubles title, partnering with Olga Danilović. They defeated Olesya Pervushina and Anastasia Potapova in the final.

== ITF Circuit finals ==
Legend
W15 tournaments

=== Singles: 2 (1 title, 1 runner-up) ===
Result	W–L	Date	Tournament	Tier	Surface	Opponent	Score
Loss	0–1	Jul 2019	ITF Tabarka, Tunisia	W15	Clay	(Italy) Federica Arcidiacono	6–3, 1–6, 3–6
Win	1–1	Apr 2023	ITF Telde, Spain	W15	Clay	(Australia) Kaylah McPhee	7–5, 6–4

=== Doubles: 6 (3 titles, 3 runner-ups) ===
Result	W–L	Date	Tournament	Tier	Surface	Partner	Opponents	Score
Win	1–0	Sep 2017	ITF Melilla, Spain	W15	Clay	(Spain) Eva Guerrero Álvarez	(Spain) Noelia Bouzó Zanotti (Spain) Ángela Fita Boluda	4–6, 6–4, [10–3]
Win	2–0	Sep 2018	ITF Monastir, Tunisia	W15	Hard	(Spain) Andrea Lázaro García	(Tunisia) Chiraz Bechri (Cambodia) Andrea Ka	6–1, 6–0
Win	3–0	Sep 2018	ITF Monastir, Tunisia	W15	Hard	(Spain) Andrea Lázaro García	(Venezuela) Nadia Echeverría Alam (United Kingdom) Anna Popescu	7–5, 6–0
Loss	3–1	Jul 2019	ITF Tabarka, Tunisia	W15	Clay	(Germany) Julyette Steur	(Italy) Federica Arcidiacono (Italy) Nuria Brancaccio	4–6, 6–4, [6–10]
Loss	3–2	Nov 2019	ITF Antalya, Turkey	W15	Hard	(Malta) Francesca Curmi	(Czech Republic) Johana Marková (Slovenia) Nika Radišič	2–6, 6–4, [9–11]
Loss	3–3	Jul 2022	ITF Casablanca, Morocco	W15	Clay	(Switzerland) Marie Mettraux	Anastasiia Gureva (France) Laïa Petretic	1–6, 2–6

== Junior Grand Slam tournament finals ==
=== Girls' doubles: 1 (title) ===
Result	Year	Tournament	Surface	Partner	Opponents	Score
Win	2016	French Open	Clay	(Serbia) Olga Danilović	(Russia) Olesya Pervushina (Russia) Anastasia Potapova	3–6, 6–3, [10–8]
