= Elina Avanesyan =

Armenian tennis player (born 2002)

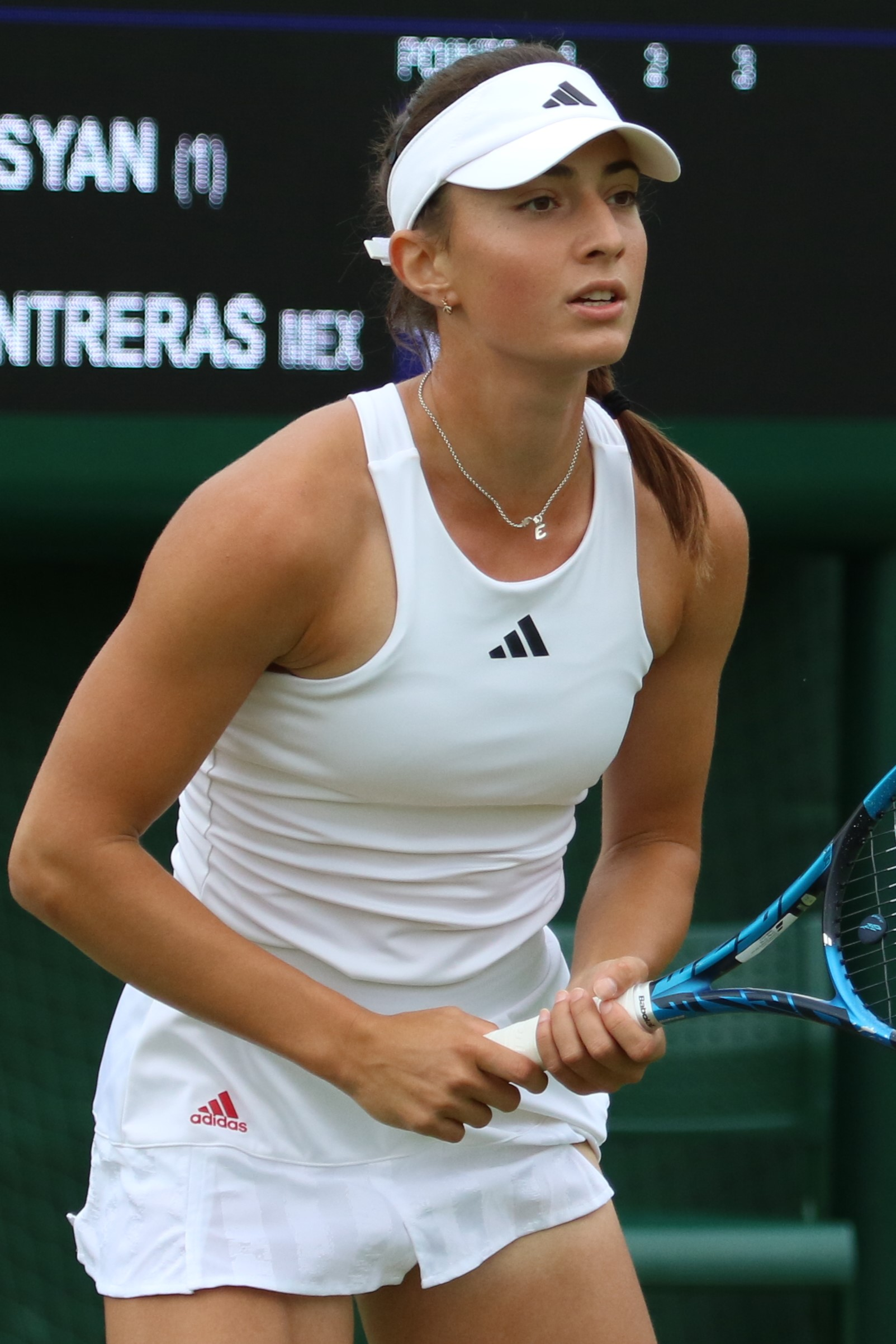
- Avanesyan at the 2023 Wimbledon Championships
- Full name: Elina Ararati Avanesyan
- Native name: Էլինա Արարատի Ավանեսյան
- Country (sports): Armenia (Aug 2024–); Russia (2017–2024)
- Residence: Spain
- Born: 17 September 2002 (age 24) Pyatigorsk, Russia
- Height: 1.72 m (5 ft 8 in)
- Plays: Right (two-handed backhand)
- Prize money: $2,583,543

Singles
- Career record: 224–148
- Career titles: 6 ITF
- Highest ranking: No. 36 (17 March 2025)
- Current ranking: No. 148 (21 September 2026)

Grand Slam singles results
- Australian Open: 3R (2024)
- French Open: 4R (2023, 2024)
- Wimbledon: 2R (2024)
- US Open: 2R (2023)

Doubles
- Career record: 78–33
- Career titles: 9 ITF
- Highest ranking: No. 163 (12 August 2024)

Grand Slam doubles results
- Australian Open: 2R (2024)
- French Open: 2R (2024)
- Wimbledon: 1R (2024)
- US Open: 3R (2023)
- Last updated on: 26 September 2026.

Elina Ararati Avanesyan (Armenian: Էլինա Արարատի Ավանեսյան; Russian: Элина Араратовна Аванесян; born 17 September 2002) is a Russian-born Armenian tennis player. She has a career-high WTA singles ranking of No. 36, achieved on 17 March 2025, and a best doubles ranking of No. 163, reached in August 2024.

Avanesyan has won six singles and nine doubles titles at tournaments of the ITF World Tour.

== Personal background ==
=== Early life ===
Avanesyan was born in Pyatigorsk, Russia, to an Armenian family. Her parents are from Artsakh ( Nagorno-Karabakh ) and moved to Russia in 1992 during the First Nagorno-Karabakh War. She has a brother and a sister.

=== Nationality change ===
In June 2024, it was announced that Avanesyan had begun the process of applying for Armenian citizenship and planned to compete under the flag of Armenia. She had previously completed in several junior tournaments in the Armenian capital Yerevan, winning four of them.

In August 2024, she joined the Talent Pool program of the Keron Development Foundation and Avanesyan became an Armenian citizen and began representing Armenia.

== Career ==
=== 2021: First ITF Circuit title ===
She won her first W60 title at the Reinert Open as a lucky loser.

=== 2022: WTA Tour, major and WTA 1000 debuts ===
She made her WTA Tour debut at the 2022 Copa Colsanitas, where she reached the quarterfinals, and her major debut as a qualifier at the US Open.

She also made her debut at the WTA 1000 level at the Italian Open as a qualifier, and also entered the main draw of the new WTA 1000 Guadalajara Open as a lucky loser.

=== 2023: French Open fourth round, top 65 ===
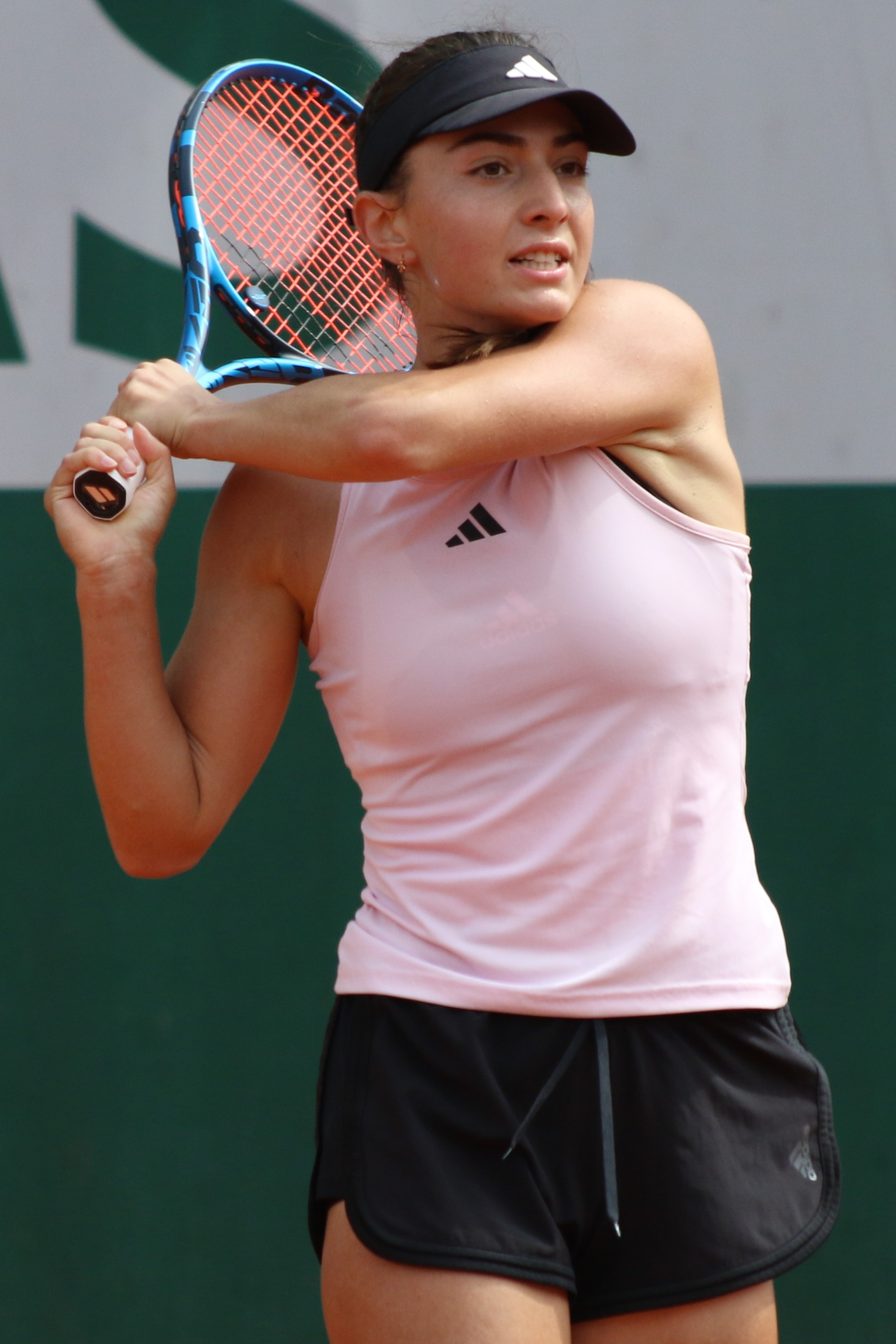
Avanesyan at the 2023 French Open

Ranked No. 134, Avanesyan made her debut at the French Open as a lucky loser. In the first round, she upset 12th seed Belinda Bencic for her first major and top-20 win. She defeated French wildcard Léolia Jeanjean in the second round and qualifier Clara Tauson in the third, becoming the first lucky loser at Roland Garros in the last 16 in 35 years since 1988 and only the fifth overall at this major. As a result, she reached the top 80 rising 54 positions in the rankings on 12 June 2023.

She made her WTA 500 debut at the German Open, also as a lucky loser and defeated eighth seed Daria Kasatkina. As a result, she reached a new career-high ranking of No. 64, on 26 June 2023.

She reached the second round of the US Open by defeating Alizé Cornet in the first round. At the same tournament, she reached the third round in doubles, partnering Kamilla Rakhimova as an alternate pair, defeating 10th seeded pair of Jelena Ostapenko and Lyudmyla Kichenok, but lost to eight seeds Hsieh Su-wei and Wang Xinyu.

She finished the year ranked No. 75.

=== 2024: Australian Open debut, first top 10 win & WTA Tour final, top 50 ===
On her debut at the Australian Open, she recorded two wins over Bai Zhuoxuan and eighth seed Maria Sakkari, her first top 10 win. On her debut at Indian Wells, she lost to Océane Dodin. On another debut at the Miami Open, she recorded her first WTA 1000-level win over wildcard Erika Andreeva, and her second top 10 and biggest win of her career, over sixth seed Ons Jabeur, to reach her first third round at this level.

At the French Open, she reached a consecutive fourth round with wins over Zhu Lin, Anna Blinkova and seventh seed Zheng Qinwen. Her run was ended by 12th seed Jasmine Paolini. At Wimbledon, she reached the second round for the first time with a win over Anhelina Kalinina in her opening match. She lost in round two against 15th seed Liudmila Samsonova.

Avanesyan made it through to the quarterfinals at the Budapest Grand Prix, defeating fifth seed Magdalena Fręch and Rebeka Masarova before losing to Anna Karolína Schmiedlová in three sets.

Avanesyan reached her first WTA Tour semifinal at the Iași Open, defeating third seed Jaqueline Cristian in the quarterfinals. In the last four, Avanesyan defeated Chloé Paquet and advanced into her maiden WTA Tour final which she lost to Mirra Andreeva when she retired injured while trailing in the third set.

She recorded her first tour main-draw win under her new Armenian nationality at the Cincinnati Open as a lucky loser, making history for her country as the first player to do so, over wildcard Bianca Andreescu. Next, she defeated eighth seed Jeļena Ostapenko to reach her second WTA 1000 third round, where she lost to tenth seed Liudmila Samsonova.

At the Wuhan Open, she lost a three-setter to 13th seed Marta Kostyuk in the first round. Seeded fifth at the Japan Women's Open, Avanesyan defeated defending champion Ashlyn Krueger, before going out to local wildcard Sara Saito.

She finished the year ranked inside the top 50.

=== 2025: First Armenian in WTA 500 semifinal ===
Avanesyan started her 2025 season at the Brisbane International, defeating Rebecca Šramková and fourth seed Paula Badosa, before losing to Ons Jabeur in the third round. The following week, at the Hobart International, she overcame qualifiers Wang Xiyu and Greet Minnen, then benefitted from the withdrawal of third seed Amanda Anisimova to reach the semifinals, where she lost to eventual champion, McCartney Kessler.

At the Mérida Open in Mexico, Avanesyan became the first Armenian player to reach a WTA 500 semifinal with a win over Maya Joint. She lost in the last four to top seed and eventual champion, Emma Navarro. In March, she was diagnosed with mononucleosis.

== Performance timeline ==
Key
W	F	SF	QF	#R	RR	Q#	DNQ	A	NH

(W) winner; (F) finalist; (SF) semifinalist; (QF) quarterfinalist; (#R) rounds 4, 3, 2, 1; (RR) round-robin stage; (Q#) qualification round; (DNQ) did not qualify; (A) absent; (NH) not held; (SR) strike rate (events won / competed); (W–L) win–loss record.
To avoid confusion and double counting, these charts are updated at the conclusion of a tournament or when the player's participation has ended.

Only main-draw results in WTA Tour, Grand Slam tournaments, Billie Jean King Cup, United Cup, Hopman Cup and Olympic Games are included in win–loss records.

=== Singles ===
Current through the 2026 US Open.

Tournament	2022	2023	2024	2025	2026	SR	W–L	Win %
Grand Slam tournaments
Australian Open	Q3	Q2	3R	1R	A	0 / 2	2–2	50%
French Open	Q1	4R	4R	1R	A	0 / 3	6–3	67%
Wimbledon	A (Note: Russian players were barred due to the Russian invasion of Ukraine.)	Q2	2R	1R	A	0 / 2	1–2	33%
US Open	1R	2R	1R	1R	Q1	0 / 4	1–4	20%
Win–loss	0–1	4–2	6–4	0–4	0–0	0 / 9	10–11	48%
WTA 1000
Qatar Open (Note: The first Premier 5 event of the year has switched back and forth between the Dubai Tennis Championships and the Qatar Ladies Open since 2009 until 2024. Dubai was classified as a Premier 5 event from 2009 to 2011 before being succeeded by Doha for the 2012–2014 period. In 2015, Dubai regained its Premier 5 status while Doha was demoted to Premier status. The Premier 5 tournaments were reclassified as WTA 1000 tournaments in 2021.)	A	A	A	2R	A	0 / 1	1–1	50%
Dubai	A	A	A	1R	A	0 / 1	0–1	0%
Indian Wells Open	A	A	1R	2R	A	0 / 2	1–2	33%
Miami Open	A	A	3R	2R	A	0 / 2	3–2	60%
Madrid Open	A	Q1	1R	1R	Q1	0 / 2	0–2	0%
Italian Open	1R	A	2R	1R	A	0 / 3	1–3	25%
Canadian Open	A	A	A	A	A	0 / 0	0–0	–
Cincinnati Open	A	A	3R	A	A	0 / 1	2–1	67%
Guadalajara Open	1R	A	NTI			0 / 1	0–1	0%
Wuhan Open	NH		1R	A		0 / 1	0–1	0%
China Open	NH	Q2	3R	A		0 / 1	2–1	67%
Win–loss	0–2	0–0	7–7	3–6		0 / 15	10–15	40%
Career statistics
	2022	2023	2024	2025	2026	SR	W–L	Win %
Tournaments	6	10	22	17	0	Career total: 55		
Titles	0	0	0	0	0	Career total: 0		
Finals	0	0	1	0	0	Career total: 1		
Hard win–loss	0–3	1–5	12–12	11–10	0–0	0 / 30	24–30	44%
Clay win–loss	3–3	8–4	11–7	1–4	0–0	0 / 18	23–18	56%
Grass win–loss	0–0	2–1	1–3	0–1	0–0	0 / 5	3–5	38%
Overall win–loss	3–6	11–10	24–22	12–17	0–0	0 / 55	50–55	48%
Year-end ranking	134	75	44	120		$2,547,258		

== WTA Tour finals ==
=== Singles: 1 (runner-up) ===
Legend WTA 250 (0–1)	Finals by surface Clay (0–1)	Finals by setting Outdoor (0–1)

Result	W–L	Date	Tournament	Tier	Surface	Opponent	Score
Loss	0–1	Jul 2024	Iași Open, Romania	WTA 250	Clay	Mirra Andreeva	7–5, 5–7, 0–4 ret.

== ITF Circuit finals ==
=== Singles: 13 (6 titles, 7 runner-ups) ===
Legend W100 tournaments (2–0) W60 tournaments (1–2) W25 tournaments (0–1) W15 tournaments (3–4)	Finals by surface Clay (6–7)

Result	W–L	Date	Tournament	Tier	Surface	Opponent	Score
Loss	0–1	Aug 2019	ITF Moscow, Russia	W15	Clay	(Russia) Amina Anshba	4–6, 3–6
Win	1–1	Sep 2019	ITF Shymkent, Kazakhstan	W15	Clay	(Serbia) Tamara Čurović	6–2, 7–5
Loss	1–2	Dec 2020	ITF Cairo, Egypt	W15	Clay	(Brazil) Carolina Alves	0–6, 5–7
Loss	1–3	Jan 2021	ITF Cairo, Egypt	W15	Clay	(Austria) Sinja Kraus	2–6, 3–6
Win	2–3	Apr 2021	ITF Cairo, Egypt	W15	Clay	(Japan) Eri Shimizu	6–1, 6–0
Win	3–3	May 2021	ITF Cairo, Egypt	W15	Clay	(Kazakhstan) Zhibek Kulambayeva	3–6, 6–4, 6–4
Loss	3–4	May 2021	ITF Cairo, Egypt	W15	Clay	(Bulgaria) Gergana Topalova	3–6, 3–6
Win	4–4	Aug 2021	Reinert Open, Germany	W60	Clay	(Italy) Federica di Sarra	6–7^{(4–7)}, 6–2, 6–2
Loss	4–5	Oct 2021	ITF Seville, Spain	W25	Clay	(France) Diane Parry	2–6, 0–6
Loss	4–6	Nov 2021	Aberto da República, Brazil	W60	Clay	(Hungary) Panna Udvardy	6–0, 4–6, 3–6
Loss	4–7	Jul 2022	Internazionali di Cordenons, Italy	W60	Clay	(Hungary) Panna Udvardy	2–6, 0–6
Win	5–7	May 2023	Wiesbaden Open, Germany	W100	Clay	(Australia) Jaimee Fourlis	6–2, 6–0
Win	6–7	Jun 2026	Zagreb Ladies Open, Croatia	W100	Clay	(Sweden) Kajsa Rinaldo Persson	6–1, 6–3

=== Doubles: 16 (9 titles, 7 runner-ups) ===
Legend W60 tournaments W15 tournaments	Finals by surface Hard (1–1) Clay (8–6)

Result	W–L	Date	Tournament	Tier	Surface	Partner	Opponents	Score
Loss	0–1	Aug 2017	ITF Moscow, Russia	15,000	Clay	(Russia) Avelina Sayfetdinova	(Belarus) Ilona Kremen (Belarus) Iryna Shymanovich	4–6, 4–6
Win	1–1	Aug 2019	ITF Moscow, Russia	15,000	Clay	(Russia) Taisya Pachkaleva	(Russia) Ekaterina Makarova (Belarus) Sviatlana Pirazhenka	6–2, 7–5
Loss	1–2	Sep 2019	ITF Shymkent, Kazakhstan	15,000	Clay	(Belarus) Viktoryia Kanapatskaya	(Russia) Veronika Pepelyaeva (Russia) Mariia Tkacheva	4–6, 4–6
Win	2–2	Sep 2019	ITF Shymkent, Kazakhstan	15,000	Clay	(Belarus) Viktoryia Kanapatskaya	(Kazakhstan) Yekaterina Dmitrichenko (Russia) Avelina Sayfetdinova	6–3, 6–0
Win	3–2	Nov 2020	ITF Sharm El Sheikh, Egypt	W15	Hard	(Belarus) Iryna Shymanovich	(Switzerland) Valentina Ryser (Switzerland) Lulu Sun	6–4, 6–1
Loss	3–3	Nov 2020	ITF Sharm El Sheikh, Egypt	W15	Hard	(Belarus) Iryna Shymanovich	(Czech Republic) Michaela Bayerlová (Czech Republic) Laetitia Pulchartová	4–6, 5–7
Win	4–3	Nov 2020	ITF Cairo, Egypt	W15	Clay	(Belarus) Anna Kubareva	(United States) Anastasia Nefedova (Argentina) Jazmín Ortenzi	6–3, 7–5
Loss	4–4	Dec 2020	ITF Cairo, Egypt	W15	Clay	(Belarus) Anna Kubareva	(Czech Republic) Anna Sisková (Netherlands) Lexie Stevens	6–3, 4–6, [8–10]
Loss	4–5	Dec 2020	ITF Cairo, Egypt	W15	Clay	(Russia) Anastasia Tikhonova	(Russia) Daria Mishina (Russia) Noel Saidenova	2–6, 6–2, [9–11]
Win	5–5	Jan 2021	ITF Cairo, Egypt	W15	Clay	(Netherlands) Lexie Stevens	(Italy) Gloria Ceschi (Italy) Marion Viertler	6–1, 6–2
Win	6–5	Jan 2021	ITF Cairo, Egypt	W15	Clay	(Netherlands) Lexie Stevens	(United States) Emma Davis (United States) Anastasia Nefedova	6–1, 6–2
Win	7–5	Apr 2021	ITF Cairo, Egypt	W15	Clay	(South Korea) Park So-hyun	(Slovakia) Barbora Matúšová (Russia) Anastasia Zolotareva	6–4, 6–4
Win	8–5	Apr 2021	ITF Cairo, Egypt	W15	Clay	(Russia) Maria Timofeeva	(Netherlands) Isabelle Haverlag (Netherlands) Merel Hoedt	1–6, 6–4, [10–8]
Loss	8–6	May 2021	ITF Cairo, Egypt	W15	Clay	(Romania) Oana Gavrilă	(Italy) Nicole Fossa Huergo (Kazakhstan) Zhibek Kulambayeva	3–6, 2–6
Win	9–6	Aug 2021	ITF San Bartolomé, Spain	W60	Clay	(Russia) Oksana Selekhmeteva	(Netherlands) Arianne Hartono (Australia) Olivia Tjandramulia	7–5, 6–2
Loss	9–7	Aug 2022	ITF San Bartolomé, Spain	W60	Clay	Diana Shnaider	(Spain) Ángela Fita Boluda (Netherlands) Arantxa Rus	4–6, 4–6

== Wins over top 10 players ==
- Avanesyan's match record against players who were, at the time the match was played, ranked in the top 10.

Season	2024	Total
Wins	3	3

#	Player	Rank	Event	Surface	Rd	Score	EAR	Ref
2024
1.	(Greece) Maria Sakkari	8	Australian Open, Australia	Hard	2R	6–4, 6–4	74	
2.	(Tunisia) Ons Jabeur	6	Miami Open, United States	Hard	2R	6–1, 4–6, 6–3	65	
3.	(China) Zheng Qinwen	7	French Open, France	Clay	3R	3–6, 6–3, 7–6^{(10–6)}	70	
