= Olivia Tjandramulia =

Australian tennis player

- Country (sports): Australia
- Residence: Rockhampton, Australia
- Born: 11 May 1997 (age 29) Jakarta, Indonesia
- Height: 1.67 m (5 ft 6 in)
- Plays: Right (two-handed backhand)
- Prize money: $233,799

Singles
- Career record: 175–205
- Career titles: 0
- Highest ranking: No. 350 (11 June 2018)

Grand Slam singles results
- Australian Open: Q1 (2020)

Doubles
- Career record: 179–183
- Career titles: 10 ITF
- Highest ranking: No. 100 (12 June 2023)

Grand Slam doubles results
- Australian Open: 1R (2014, 2017, 2022, 2023)

Olivia Tjandramulia (born 11 May 1997) is an Indonesian-born Australian former tennis player.

Tjandramulia reached a career-high singles ranking of world No. 350 on 11 June 2018. On 12 June 2023, she peaked at No. 100 in the WTA doubles rankings.

On the ITF Junior Circuit, she achieved a career-high ranking of 39, on 31 August 2015. She was an Australian under-18 girls champion.

== Personal life ==
Tjandramulia was born in Jakarta, Indonesia but grew up in Rockhampton, Australia.

== Career ==
She made her WTA Tour debut at the 2014 Hobart International, in singles and in doubles, partnering with Kimberly Birrell.

She made her WTA 1000 debut in doubles at the 2023 Guadalajara Open with Anna Rogers as an alternate pair.

== ITF Circuit finals ==
=== Singles: 3 (3 runner-ups) ===
Legend $25,000 tournaments $10,000 tournaments	Finals by surface Hard (0–3)

Result	W–L	Date	Tournament	Tier	Surface	Opponent	Score
Loss	0–1	Sep 2014	ITF Yeongwol, South Korea	10,000	Hard	(South Korea) Lee Jin-a	2–6, 2–6
Loss	0–2	Oct 2015	ITF Cairns, Australia	25,000	Hard	(Hungary) Dalma Gálfi	4–6, 7–6^{(9)}, 1–6
Loss	0–3	Jun 2017	Kōfu Women's Cup, Japan	25,000	Hard	(Japan) Haruka Kaji	1–6, 3–6

=== Doubles: 21 (10 titles, 11 runner-ups) ===
Legend $80,000 tournaments $60,000 tournaments $25,000 tournaments $15,000 tournaments	Finals by surface Hard (6–5) Clay (2–5) Grass (1–1) Carpet (1–0)

Result	W–L	Date	Tournament	Tier	Surface	Partner	Opponents	Score
Win	1–0	Mar 2016	ITF Mildura, Australia	25,000	Grass	(United States) Jessica Wacnik	(Japan) Mana Ayukawa (Japan) Yuuki Tanaka	6–0, 6–3
Loss	1–1	May 2017	ITF Goyang, South Korea	25,000	Hard	(Australia) Genevieve Lorbergs	(Thailand) Nicha Lertpitaksinchai (Thailand) Peangtarn Plipuech	5–7, 4–6
Loss	1–2	Jul 2017	Challenger de Granby, Canada	60,000	Hard	(Chile) Alexa Guarachi	(Australia) Ellen Perez (Canada) Carol Zhao	2–6, 2–6
Loss	1–3	Feb 2018	ITF Perth, Australia	25,000	Hard	(Australia) Belinda Woolcock	(Australia) Jessica Moore (Australia) Ellen Perez	7–6^{(6)}, 1–6, [9–7] ret.
Win	2–3	Feb 2018	ITF Perth, Australia	25,000	Hard	(Australia) Jessica Moore	(Australia) Alison Bai (China) Lu Jiajing	7–5, 6–7^{(8)}, [11–9]
Loss	2–4	Mar 2018	ITF Mildura, Australia	25,000	Grass	(Australia) Alexandra Bozovic	(United Kingdom) Katy Dunne (United Kingdom) Gabriella Taylor	7–5, 6–7^{(4)}, [5–10]
Win	3–4	Jun 2018	ITF Singapore	25,000	Hard	(Australia) Zoe Hives	(Japan) Miyabi Inoue (Japan) Junri Namigata	6–4, 4–6, [10–6]
Loss	3–5	Aug 2018	ITF Fort Worth, United States	25,000	Hard	(Japan) Ayaka Okuno	(Chinese Taipei) Hsu Chieh-yu (Mexico) Marcela Zacarías	6–3, 6–7^{(6)}, [6–10]
Loss	3–6	Oct 2019	ITF Florence, United States	25,000	Hard	(Mexico) Marcela Zacarías	(United States) Emina Bektas (United Kingdom) Tara Moore	5–7, 4–6
Win	4–6	Oct 2019	ITF Dallas, United States	25,000	Hard	(Mexico) Marcela Zacarías	(United States) Jamie Loeb (United Kingdom) Emily Appleton	6–3, 6–4
Win	5–6	Jun 2021	ITF Madrid, Spain	25,000	Hard	(United States) Ashley Lahey	(Spain) Yvonne Cavallé Reimers (Spain) Celia Cerviño Ruiz	6–2, 4–6, [10–8]
Loss	5–7	Aug 2021	ITF Gran Canaria, Spain	60,000	Clay	(Netherlands) Arianne Hartono	(Russia) Elina Avanesyan (Russia) Oksana Selekhmeteva	5–7, 2–6
Win	6–7	Aug 2021	ITF Gran Canaria 2	60,000	Clay	(Netherlands) Arianne Hartono	(Argentina) María Lourdes Carlé (Argentina) Julieta Estable	6–4, 2–6, [10–7]
Loss	6–8	Sep 2021	ITF Trieste, Italy	25,000	Clay	(Lithuania) Justina Mikulskytė	(Romania) Andreea Prisăcariu (Slovenia) Nika Radišić	5–7, 2–6
Loss	6–9	Sep 2021	Wiesbaden Open, Germany	80,000	Clay	(Netherlands) Arianne Hartono	(Hungary) Anna Bondár (Belgium) Lara Salden	7–6^{(9)}, 2–6, [4–10]
Win	7–9	Nov 2021	Copa Colina, Chile	60,000+H	Clay	(Netherlands) Arianne Hartono	(Germany) Katharina Gerlach (Chile) Daniela Seguel	6–1, 6–3
Loss	7–10	Nov 2021	Aberto da República, Brazil	60,000	Clay (i)	(Ukraine) Valeriya Strakhova	(Brazil) Carolina Alves (Argentina) María Lourdes Carlé	2–6, 1–6
Win	8–10	Jun 2022	ITF Cantanhede, Portugal	25,000	Carpet	(Indonesia) Jessy Rompies	(Brazil) Ingrid Martins (United Kingdom) Emily Webley-Smith	6–2, 7–6^{(1)}
Win	9–10	Oct 2022	ITF Fredericton, Canada	25,000	Hard (i)	(Netherlands) Arianne Hartono	(Slovakia) Viktória Morvayová (Czech Republic) Anna Sisková	7–5, 6–1
Win	10–10	Oct 2022	Challenger de Saguenay, Canada	60,000	Hard (i)	(Netherlands) Arianne Hartono	(United States) Catherine Harrison (Belgium) Yanina Wickmayer	5–7, 7–6^{(3)}, [10–8]
Loss	10–11	Jun 2023	Internazionali di Brescia, Italy	60,000	Clay	Alena Fomina-Klotz	(Japan) Mai Hontama (Japan) Moyuka Uchijima	1–6, 0–6
