= Arianne Hartono =

Dutch tennis player (born 1996)

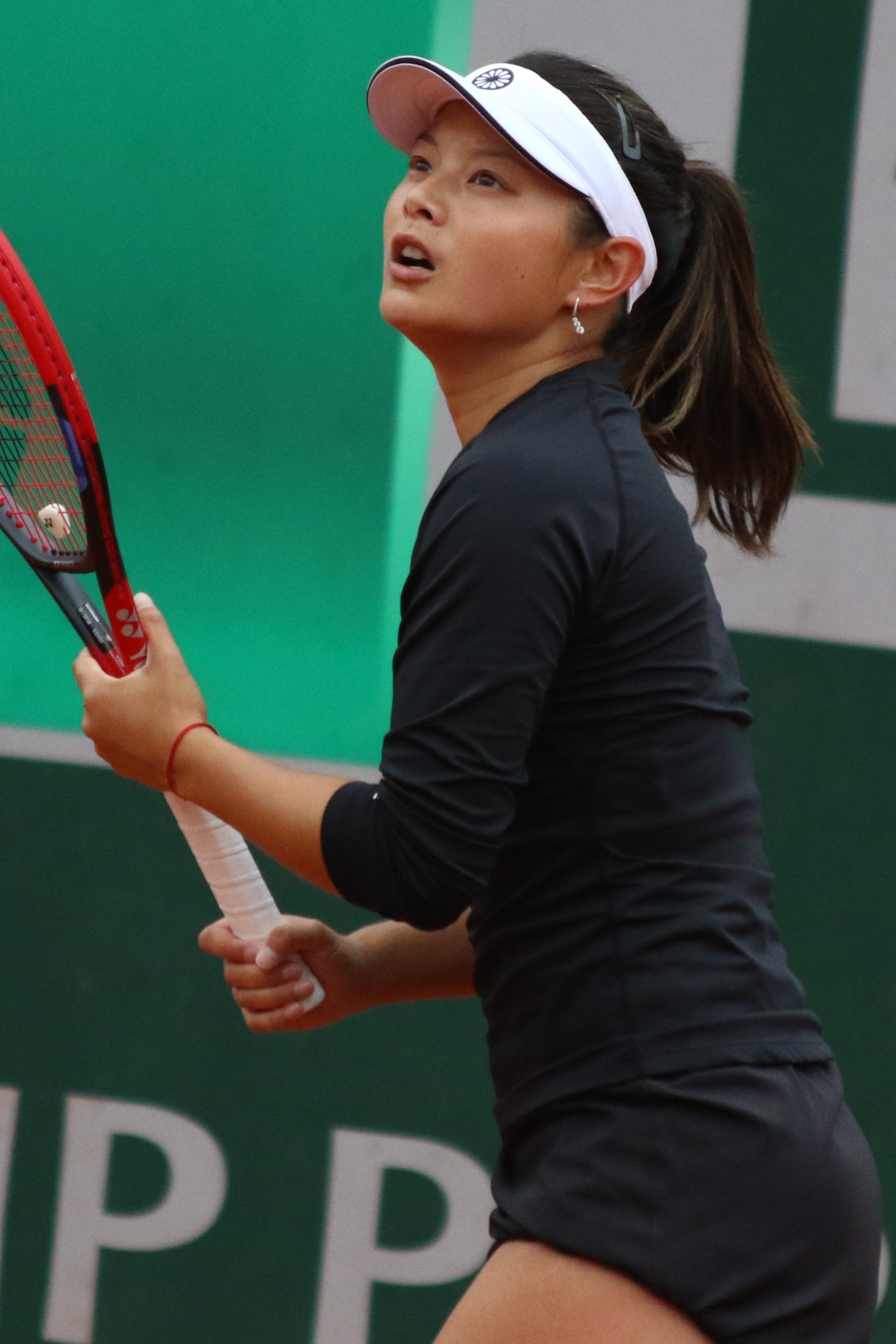
- Hartono at the 2023 French Open
- Country (sports): Netherlands
- Residence: Meppel, Netherlands
- Born: 21 April 1996 (age 30) Groningen, Netherlands
- Turned pro: 2018
- Retired: 2026
- Plays: Right (two-handed backhand)
- College: University of Mississippi (2015–18)
- Prize money: US$ 922,806

Singles
- Career record: 267–204
- Career titles: 3 ITF
- Highest ranking: No. 135 (8 April 2024)
- Current ranking: No. 331 (25 May 2026)

Grand Slam singles results
- Australian Open: 1R (2022, 2023)
- French Open: Q1 (2022, 2023, 2024, 2025)
- Wimbledon: Q2 (2022, 2025)
- US Open: Q3 (2023, 2024, 2025)

Doubles
- Career record: 176–111
- Career titles: 21 ITF
- Highest ranking: No. 123 (11 July 2022)
- Current ranking: No. 310 (25 May 2026)

Grand Slam doubles results
- Wimbledon: 2R (2022)

Arianne Hartono (born 21 April 1996) is a Dutch former professional tennis player. On 8 April 2024, she reached her career-high singles ranking of No. 135, and on 11 July 2022, she achieved world No. 123 in doubles. Hartono won three singles titles and 21 doubles titles on the ITF Circuit.

== Personal life ==
She is of Indonesian and Chinese descent, and is the niece of Deddy and Lukky Tedjamukti. Her cousin Nadia Ravita is also a tennis player, currently at the University of Kentucky.

== Career ==
Hartono played tennis during her college years for University of Mississippi and won the 2018 NCAA Division I Women's Tennis Championship, becoming the first Dutch player to do so.

The same year she won the Honda Sports Award awarded to the top female collegiate tennis player.

Hartono made her WTA Tour main-draw debut as a qualifier at the 2021 Luxembourg Open, defeating Anna-Lena Friedsam in the first round, before losing her next match to Jelena Ostapenko in three sets.

She made her Grand Slam tournament debut at the 2022 Australian Open, losing to Amanda Anisimova in the first round. She repeated the feat qualifying for a second year in a row at the Australian Open in 2023 but was again defeated in her opening match, this time by Shelby Rogers.

Ranked No. 180 at the 2024 Thailand Open, Hartono qualified for the main draw and reached her first WTA Tour quarterfinal defeating Gao Xinyu. Next, she defeated Mai Hontama to reach her first tour semifinal and moved close to 40 positions up just six places off the career-high of No. 135 she set in May. However, she lost in the last four to Laura Siegemund.

In March 2026, Hartono announced her retirement from professional tennis.

== Performance timelines ==
Key
W	F	SF	QF	#R	RR	Q#	DNQ	A	NH

(W) winner; (F) finalist; (SF) semifinalist; (QF) quarterfinalist; (#R) rounds 4, 3, 2, 1; (RR) round-robin stage; (Q#) qualification round; (DNQ) did not qualify; (A) absent; (NH) not held; (SR) strike rate (events won / competed); (W–L) win–loss record.
To avoid confusion and double counting, these charts are updated at the conclusion of a tournament or when the player's participation has ended.

Only main-draw results in WTA Tour, Grand Slam tournaments, Billie Jean King Cup, United Cup, Hopman Cup and Olympic Games are included in win–loss records.

=== Singles ===
Current through the 2025 Australian Open.

Tournament	2021	2022	2023	2024	2025	SR	W–L
Grand Slam tournaments
Australian Open	A	1R	1R	Q2	Q1	0 / 2	0–2
French Open	A	Q1	Q1	Q1	Q1	0 / 0	0–0
Wimbledon	A	Q2	Q1	Q1	Q2	0 / 0	0–0
US Open	A	Q2	Q3	Q3	Q3	0 / 0	0–0
Win–loss	0–0	0–1	0–1	0–0	0–0	0 / 2	0–2
WTA 1000
Canadian Open	A	Q1	A	A	A	0 / 0	0–0
Career statistics
Tournaments	1	6	4			Career total: 11	
Overall win-loss	1–1	1–6	2–4			0 / 11	4–11
Year-end ranking (Note: 2018: WTA ranking–668, 2019: WTA ranking–415, 2020: WTA ranking–400.)	202	188	180	147	249	$497,844	

=== Doubles ===
Current through the 2023 Ningbo Open.

Tournament	2021	2022	2023	SR	W–L
Grand Slam tournaments
Australian Open	A	A	A	0 / 0	0–0
French Open	A	A	A	0 / 0	0–0
Wimbledon	A	2R	A	0 / 1	1–1
US Open	A	A	A	0 / 0	0–0
Win–loss	0–0	1–1	0–0	0 / 1	1–1
National representation
Billie Jean King Cup (Note: Formerly known as Fed Cup until 2020.)	A	QR		0 / 0	0–1
Career statistics
Tournaments	1	5	2	Career total: 8	
Overall win-loss	0–1	2–5	0–2	0 / 8	2–8
Year-end ranking (Note: 2016: WTA ranking–972, 2017: WTA ranking–1080, 2018: WTA ranking–819, 2019: WTA ranking–485, 2020: WTA ranking–421.)	153	127	192		

== WTA 125 finals ==
=== Doubles: 3 (3 runner-ups) ===
Result	W–L	Date	Tournament	Surface	Partner	Opponents	Score
Loss	0–1	Feb 2024	Mumbai Open, India	Hard	(India) Prarthana Thombare	(Slovenia) Dalila Jakupović (United States) Sabrina Santamaria	4–6, 3–6
Loss	0–2	Feb 2025	Mumbai Open, India	Hard	(India) Prarthana Thombare	(Russia) Amina Anshba (Russia) Elena Pridankina	6–7^{(4)}, 6–2, [7–10]
Loss	0–3	Jul 2025	Hall of Fame Open, United States	Grass	(India) Prarthana Thombare	(United States) Carmen Corley (United States) Ivana Corley	6–7^{(4)}, 3–6

== ITF Circuit finals ==
=== Singles: 12 (3 titles, 9 runner-ups) ===
Legend
W100 tournaments (0–1)
W75 tournaments (0–1)
W25 tournaments (1–3)
W10/15 tournaments (2–4)

Result	W–L	Date	Tournament	Tier	Surface	Opponent	Score
Loss	0–1	Jul 2016	Amstelveen Open, Netherlands	10,000	Clay	(Netherlands) Bibiane Schoofs	7–6, 4–6, 3–6
Win	1–1	Jul 2018	ITF Jakarta, Indonesia	15,000	Hard	(India) Mahak Jain	6–4, 6–1
Loss	1–2	Aug 2018	ITF Oldenzaal, Netherlands	15,000	Clay	(Belgium) Greet Minnen	2–6, 2–6
Loss	1–3	Mar 2019	ITF Monastir, Tunesia	W15	Hard	(Denmark) Clara Tauson	2–6, 1–6
Loss	1–4	Jun 2019	ITF Jakarta, Indonesia	W25	Hard	(Japan) Risa Ozaki	4–6, 1–6
Win	2–4	Jun 2019	ITF Jakarta, Indonesia	W15	Hard	(Indonesia) Rifanty Kahfiani	6–2, 6–3
Loss	2–5	Oct 2020	ITF Lousada, Portugal	W15	Hard (i)	(Switzerland) Susan Bandecchi	6–7^{(6)}, 6–2, 2–6
Loss	2–6	Oct 2022	ITF Fredericton, Canada	W25	Hard (i)	(Canada) Stacey Fung	5–7, 3–6
Loss	2–7	Apr 2023	ITF Nottingham, United Kingdom	W25	Hard (i)	(Australia) Arina Rodionova	2–6, 1–6
Win	3–7	Jun 2023	ITF Setubal, Portugal	W25	Hard	(United States) Madison Sieg	6–2, 6–2
Loss	3–8	Dec 2023	Dubai Tennis Challenge, UAE	W100	Hard	(Russia) Anastasia Tikhonova	1–6, 4–6
Loss	3–9	Mar 2025	ITF Târgu Mureș, Romania	W75	Hard (i)	(Australia) Priscilla Hon	3–6, 4–6

=== Doubles: 29 (21 titles, 8 runner-ups) ===
Legend
W100 tournaments (3–0)
W80 tournaments (0–1)
W60/75 tournaments (4–3)
W40/50 tournaments (2–0)
W25 tournaments (4–4)
W10/15 tournaments (8–0)

Result	W–L	Date	Tournament	Tier	Surface	Partner	Opponents	Score
Win	1–0	Jun 2016	ITF Antalya, Turkey	10,000	Hard	(New Zealand) Paige Hourigan	(Romania) Raluca Șerban (Italy) Miriana Tona	6–3, ret.
Win	2–0	Jun 2017	ITF Guimarães, Portugal	15,000	Hard	(Japan) Yuriko Miyazaki	(Italy) Maria Masini (Spain) Olga Parres Azcoitia	7–5, 6–0
Win	3–0	Jul 2018	ITF Jakarta, Indonesia	15,000	Hard	(Indonesia) Aldila Sutjiadi	(Japan) Mana Ayukawa (India) Zeel Desai	6–1, 6–2
Win	4–0	Sep 2018	ITF Haren, Netherlands	15,000	Clay	(Netherlands) Suzan Lamens	(Japan) Yukina Saigo (Netherlands) Dominique Karregat	6–1, 6–7^{(1)}, [10–4]
Win	5–0	Feb 2019	ITF Monastir, Tunisia	W15	Hard	(Netherlands) Eva Vedder	(Spain) Andrea Lázaro García (Greece) Despina Papamichail	6–4, 3–6, [10–7]
Loss	5–1	Apr 2019	ITF Osprey, United States	W25	Clay	(Moldova) Alexandra Perper	(United States) Pamela Montez (Australia) Belinda Woolcock	6–7^{(6)}, 3–6
Win	6–1	Jun 2019	ITF Jakarta, Indonesia	W15	Hard	(Indonesia) Nadia Ravita	(South Africa) Lee Barnard (South Africa) Zani Barnard	2–6, 6–4, [11–9]
Win	7–1	Oct 2020	ITF Funchal, Portugal	W15	Hard	(Netherlands) Eva Vedder	(Brazil) Ingrid Martins (Brazil) Beatriz Haddad Maia	4–6, 6–1, [10–7]
Win	8–1	Nov 2020	ITF Lousada, Portugal	W15	Hard (i)	(Japan) Yuriko Miyazaki	(India) Riya Bhatia (Portugal) Inês Murta	6–1, 5–7, [10–7]
Loss	8–2	Feb 2021	Open de l'Isère, France	W25	Hard (i)	(Japan) Yuriko Miyazaki	(Romania) Ioana Loredana Roșca (Belgium) Kimberley Zimmermann	1–6, 5–7
Win	9–2	Jun 2021	ITF Porto, Portugal	W25	Hard	(Japan) Yuriko Miyazaki	(Japan) Mana Ayukawa (Japan) Akiko Omae	7–5, 6–2
Loss	9–3	Aug 2021	ITF San Bartolomé, Spain	W60	Clay	(Australia) Olivia Tjandramulia	(Russia) Elina Avanesyan (Russia) Oksana Selekhmeteva	5–7, 2–6
Win	10–3	Aug 2021	ITF San Bartolomé, Spain	W60	Clay	(Australia) Olivia Tjandramulia	(Argentina) María Carlé (Argentina) Julieta Estable	6–4, 2–6, [10–7]
Loss	10–4	Sep 2021	Wiesbaden Open, Germany	W80	Clay	(Australia) Olivia Tjandramulia	(Hungary) Anna Bondár (Belgium) Lara Salden	7–6^{(9)}, 2–6, [4–10]
Win	11–4	Oct 2021	ITF Cherbourg-en-Cotentin, France	W25+H	Hard (i)	(United Kingdom) Sarah Beth Grey	(France) Estelle Cascino (Italy) Camilla Rosatello	6–3, 6–2
Win	12–4	Nov 2021	Copa Santiago, Chile	W60+H	Clay	(Australia) Olivia Tjandramulia	(Germany) Katharina Gerlach (Chile) Daniela Seguel	6–1, 6–3
Win	13–4	Jul 2022	Reinert Open Versmold, Germany	W100	Clay	(Kazakhstan) Anna Danilina	(India) Ankita Raina (Netherlands) Rosalie van der Hoek	6–7^{(4)}, 6–4, [10–6]
Win	14–4	Oct 2022	ITF Fredericton, Canada	W25	Hard (i)	(Australia) Olivia Tjandramulia	(Slovakia) Viktória Morvayová (Czech Republic) Anna Sisková	7–5, 6–1
Win	15–4	Oct 2022	Saguenay Challenger, Canada	W60	Hard (i)	(Australia) Olivia Tjandramulia	(United States) Catherine Harrison (Belgium) Yanina Wickmayer	5–7, 7–6^{(3)}, [10–8]
Loss	15–5	Feb 2023	ITF Orlando Pro, US	60,000	Hard	(Netherlands) Eva Vedder	(United States) Ashlyn Krueger (United States) Robin Montgomery	5–7, 1–6
Loss	15–6	Feb 2023	ITF Santo Domingo, Dominican Republic	W25	Hard	(Netherlands) Eva Vedder	(United States) Jada Hart (United States) Rasheeda McAdoo	3–6, 3–6
Win	16–6	Apr 2023	ITF Kashiwa, Japan	W25	Hard	(Australia) Priscilla Hon	(Japan) Saki Imamura (Japan) Naho Sato	6–4, 3–6, [10–7]
Loss	16–7	Apr 2023	ITF Nottingham, UK	W25	Hard	(India) Rutuja Bhosale	(United Kingdom) Emily Appleton (United Kingdom) Lauryn John-Baptiste	4–6, 3–6
Win	17–7	May 2023	ITF Montemor-o-Novo, Portugal	W40	Hard	(Hong Kong) Eudice Chong	(Switzerland) Naima Karamoko (Switzerland) Conny Perrin	6–2, 6–0
Win	18–7	Jul 2023	Figueira da Foz Open, Portugal	W100	Hard	(Hong Kong) Eudice Chong	(Russia) Alina Korneeva (Russia) Anastasia Tikhonova	6–3, 6–2
Win	19–7	Apr 2024	ITF Shenzhen, China	W50	Hard	(India) Prarthana Thombare	(Hong Kong) Eudice Chong (United Kingdom) Madeleine Brooks	6–3, 6–2
Win	20–7	Jul 2024	Porto Open, Portugal	W75	Hard	(India) Prarthana Thombare	(United States) Anna Rogers (Ukraine) Kateryna Volodko	6–3, 6–4
Loss	20–8	May 2025	Empire Slovak Open, Slovakia	W75	Clay	(India) Prarthana Thombare	(France) Estelle Cascino (France) Carole Monnet	2–6, 2–6
Win	21–8	Jul 2025	Evansville Classic, US	W100	Hard	(India) Prarthana Thombare	(United States) Ayana Akli (United States) Victoria Osuigwe	6–3, 6–3
