= 2021 ITF Women's World Tennis Tour (July–September) =

The 2021 ITF Women's World Tennis Tour is the 2021 edition of the second-tier tour for women's professional tennis. It is organised by the International Tennis Federation and is a tier below the WTA Tour. The ITF Women's World Tennis Tour includes tournaments with prize money ranging from $15,000 up to $100,000.

== Key ==
Category
W100 tournaments
W80 tournaments
W60 tournaments
W25 tournaments
W15 tournaments

== Month ==
=== July ===
Week of	Tournament	Winner	Runners-up	Semifinalists	Quarterfinalists
July 5	Grand Est Open 88; Contrexéville, France; Clay; W100; Singles Draw – Doubles Draw	(Ukraine) Anhelina Kalinina; 6–2, 6–2	(Hungary) Dalma Gálfi	(France) Amandine Hesse (China) Zheng Qinwen	(Latvia) Kamilla Bartone (France) Léolia Jeanjean (France) Elsa Jacquemot (France) Océane Dodin
July 5	Grand Est Open 88; Contrexéville, France; Clay; W100; Singles Draw – Doubles Draw	(Kazakhstan) Anna Danilina (Norway) Ulrikke Eikeri; 6–0, 1–6, [10–4]	(Hungary) Dalma Gálfi (Belgium) Kimberley Zimmermann	(France) Amandine Hesse (China) Zheng Qinwen	(Latvia) Kamilla Bartone (France) Léolia Jeanjean (France) Elsa Jacquemot (France) Océane Dodin
July 5	Amstelveen Women's Open; Amstelveen, Netherlands; Clay; W60; Singles Draw – Doubles Draw	(Netherlands) Quirine Lemoine; 7–5, 6–4	(Germany) Yana Morderger	(Romania) Alexandra Cadanțu (Italy) Cristiana Ferrando	(Netherlands) Suzan Lamens (Greece) Despina Papamichail (United States) Emma Navarro (Austria) Barbara Haas
July 5	Amstelveen Women's Open; Amstelveen, Netherlands; Clay; W60; Singles Draw – Doubles Draw	(Netherlands) Suzan Lamens (Netherlands) Quirine Lemoine; 6–4, 6–3	(Russia) Amina Anshba (Czech Republic) Anastasia Dețiuc	(Romania) Alexandra Cadanțu (Italy) Cristiana Ferrando	(Netherlands) Suzan Lamens (Greece) Despina Papamichail (United States) Emma Navarro (Austria) Barbara Haas
July 5	Turin, Italy; Clay; W25; Singles and Doubles Draws	(France) Diane Parry; 6–4, 6–2	(Italy) Lucia Bronzetti	(Spain) Jéssica Bouzas Maneiro (Hungary) Panna Udvardy	(Switzerland) Susan Bandecchi (Brazil) Gabriela Cé (Burundi) Sada Nahimana (Switzerland) Ylena In-Albon
July 5	Turin, Italy; Clay; W25; Singles and Doubles Draws	(Italy) Federica Di Sarra (Italy) Camilla Rosatello; 6–2, 6–2	(Italy) Lucia Bronzetti (Italy) Aurora Zantedeschi	(Spain) Jéssica Bouzas Maneiro (Hungary) Panna Udvardy	(Switzerland) Susan Bandecchi (Brazil) Gabriela Cé (Burundi) Sada Nahimana (Switzerland) Ylena In-Albon
July 5	Nur-Sultan, Kazakhstan; Hard; W25; Singles and Doubles Draws	(Russia) Anastasia Tikhonova; 2–6, 7–5, 6–1	(Lithuania) Justina Mikulskytė	(Uzbekistan) Sabina Sharipova (Russia) Vlada Koval	(Georgia (country)) Mariam Bolkvadze (Thailand) Peangtarn Plipuech (Belarus) Iryna Shymanovich (Russia) Valeria Savinykh
July 5	Nur-Sultan, Kazakhstan; Hard; W25; Singles and Doubles Draws	(Georgia (country)) Mariam Bolkvadze (Russia) Ekaterina Yashina; 7–6^{(9–7)}, 6–1	(Russia) Vlada Koval (Russia) Anastasia Tikhonova	(Uzbekistan) Sabina Sharipova (Russia) Vlada Koval	(Georgia (country)) Mariam Bolkvadze (Thailand) Peangtarn Plipuech (Belarus) Iryna Shymanovich (Russia) Valeria Savinykh
July 5	Lisbon, Portugal; Hard; W25; Singles and Doubles Draws	(Switzerland) Lulu Sun; 6–4, 6–4	(Australia) Ellen Perez	(Finland) Anastasia Kulikova (Australia) Olivia Gadecki	(Spain) Yvonne Cavallé Reimers (Norway) Melanie Stokke (United Kingdom) Katie Swan (Japan) Haruka Kaji
July 5	Lisbon, Portugal; Hard; W25; Singles and Doubles Draws	(South Korea) Han Na-lae (Japan) Momoko Kobori; 6–3, 6–1	(Brazil) Ingrid Gamarra Martins (China) Ma Shuyue	(Finland) Anastasia Kulikova (Australia) Olivia Gadecki	(Spain) Yvonne Cavallé Reimers (Norway) Melanie Stokke (United Kingdom) Katie Swan (Japan) Haruka Kaji
July 5	Prokuplje, Serbia; Clay; W15; Singles and Doubles Draws	(Latvia) Darja Semenistaja; 6–0, 6–2	(Serbia) Natalija Senić	(Serbia) Jana Bojović (Romania) Arina Vasilescu	(Canada) Bianca Fernandez (Russia) Ekaterina Reyngold (Russia) Maria Bondarenko (Greece) Sapfo Sakellaridi
July 5	Prokuplje, Serbia; Clay; W15; Singles and Doubles Draws	(Romania) Karola Bejenaru (Ukraine) Viktoriia Dema; Walkover	(Chile) Fernanda Labraña (Italy) Anna Turati	(Serbia) Jana Bojović (Romania) Arina Vasilescu	(Canada) Bianca Fernandez (Russia) Ekaterina Reyngold (Russia) Maria Bondarenko (Greece) Sapfo Sakellaridi
July 5	Monastir, Tunisia; Hard; W15; Singles and Doubles Draws	(United States) Elizabeth Mandlik; 6–3, 4–6, 6–0	(Italy) Angelica Raggi	(Switzerland) Valentina Ryser (Argentina) Julia Riera	(Japan) Ayumi Koshiishi (United States) Anastasia Nefedova (Belgium) Eliessa Vanlangendonck (United States) Zoe Howard
July 5	Monastir, Tunisia; Hard; W15; Singles and Doubles Draws	(United States) Dalayna Hewitt (United States) Alana Smith; 6–4, 6–3	(United Kingdom) Emilie Lindh (Switzerland) Valentina Ryser	(Switzerland) Valentina Ryser (Argentina) Julia Riera	(Japan) Ayumi Koshiishi (United States) Anastasia Nefedova (Belgium) Eliessa Vanlangendonck (United States) Zoe Howard
July 12	Open de Biarritz; Biarritz, France; Clay; W60; Singles Draw – Doubles Draw	(United Kingdom) Francesca Jones; 6–4, 7–6^{(7–4)}	(Russia) Oksana Selekhmeteva	(Germany) Stephanie Wagner (Italy) Lucrezia Stefanini	(Netherlands) Arianne Hartono (France) Léolia Jeanjean (Australia) Seone Mendez (Latvia) Daniela Vismane
July 12	Open de Biarritz; Biarritz, France; Clay; W60; Singles Draw – Doubles Draw	(Russia) Oksana Selekhmeteva (Latvia) Daniela Vismane; 6–3, 7–6^{(7–5)}	(United Kingdom) Sarah Beth Grey (Belgium) Magali Kempen	(Germany) Stephanie Wagner (Italy) Lucrezia Stefanini	(Netherlands) Arianne Hartono (France) Léolia Jeanjean (Australia) Seone Mendez (Latvia) Daniela Vismane
July 12	President's Cup; Nur-Sultan, Kazakhstan; Hard; W60; Singles Draw – Doubles Draw	(Georgia (country)) Mariam Bolkvadze; 4–6, 6–3, 6–2	(Russia) Valeria Savinykh	(Belarus) Yuliya Hatouka (Russia) Ekaterina Shalimova	(Belarus) Shalimar Talbi (Belarus) Anna Kubareva (Russia) Anastasia Tikhonova (Belarus) Iryna Shymanovich
July 12	President's Cup; Nur-Sultan, Kazakhstan; Hard; W60; Singles Draw – Doubles Draw	(Russia) Alina Charaeva (Russia) Maria Timofeeva; 7–6^{(7–5)}, 2–6, [10–6]	(Russia) Evgeniya Levashova (Brazil) Laura Pigossi	(Belarus) Yuliya Hatouka (Russia) Ekaterina Shalimova	(Belarus) Shalimar Talbi (Belarus) Anna Kubareva (Russia) Anastasia Tikhonova (Belarus) Iryna Shymanovich
July 12	Open Araba en Femenino; Vitoria-Gasteiz, Spain; Hard; W60; Singles Draw – Doubles Draw	(Spain) Rebeka Masarova; 7–6^{(7–3)}, 6–4	(Spain) Ane Mintegi del Olmo	(Spain) Estela Pérez Somarriba (Japan) Mai Hontama	(Netherlands) Lesley Pattinama Kerkhove (Finland) Anastasia Kulikova (France) Jessika Ponchet (Paraguay) Verónica Cepede Royg
July 12	Open Araba en Femenino; Vitoria-Gasteiz, Spain; Hard; W60; Singles Draw – Doubles Draw	(Australia) Olivia Gadecki (Spain) Rebeka Masarova; 6–3, 6–3	(Spain) Celia Cerviño Ruiz (United Kingdom) Olivia Nicholls	(Spain) Estela Pérez Somarriba (Japan) Mai Hontama	(Netherlands) Lesley Pattinama Kerkhove (Finland) Anastasia Kulikova (France) Jessika Ponchet (Paraguay) Verónica Cepede Royg
July 12	Telavi Open; Telavi, Georgia; Clay; W25; Singles and Doubles Draws	(Netherlands) Suzan Lamens; 7–5, 6–2	(Switzerland) Joanne Züger	(France) Marine Partaud (Georgia (country)) Sofia Shapatava	(Russia) Ekaterina Makarova (Spain) Yvonne Cavallé Reimers (Russia) Darya Astakhova (Mexico) Fernanda Contreras
July 12	Telavi Open; Telavi, Georgia; Clay; W25; Singles and Doubles Draws	(North Macedonia) Lina Gjorcheska (Ukraine) Valeriya Strakhova; 4–6, 6–4, [10–5]	(Argentina) Victoria Bosio (Italy) Angelica Moratelli	(France) Marine Partaud (Georgia (country)) Sofia Shapatava	(Russia) Ekaterina Makarova (Spain) Yvonne Cavallé Reimers (Russia) Darya Astakhova (Mexico) Fernanda Contreras
July 12	Tarvisio, Italy; Clay; W25; Singles and Doubles Draws	(Romania) Cristina Dinu; 6–2, 6–0	(Brazil) Gabriela Cé	(Romania) Oana Georgeta Simion (Slovenia) Tina Cvetkovič	(Slovenia) Nina Potočnik (Chile) Bárbara Gatica (United States) Ashley Lahey (Switzerland) Fiona Ganz
July 12	Tarvisio, Italy; Clay; W25; Singles and Doubles Draws	(Sweden) Caijsa Hennemann (Slovenia) Nika Radišić; 6–4, 6–1	(Chile) Bárbara Gatica (Brazil) Rebeca Pereira	(Romania) Oana Georgeta Simion (Slovenia) Tina Cvetkovič	(Slovenia) Nina Potočnik (Chile) Bárbara Gatica (United States) Ashley Lahey (Switzerland) Fiona Ganz
July 12	Evansville, United States; Hard; W25; Singles and Doubles Draws	(Canada) Rebecca Marino; 6–3, 3–6, 6–0	(Japan) Mayo Hibi	(United States) Katrina Scott (United States) Ellie Douglas	(United States) Catherine Harrison (Colombia) Emiliana Arango (United States) Hina Inoue (Indonesia) Aldila Sutjiadi
July 12	Evansville, United States; Hard; W25; Singles and Doubles Draws	(United States) Kylie Collins (United States) Robin Montgomery; 5–7, 6–3, [10–2]	(United States) Lauren Proctor (United States) Anna Ulyashchenko	(United States) Katrina Scott (United States) Ellie Douglas	(United States) Catherine Harrison (Colombia) Emiliana Arango (United States) Hina Inoue (Indonesia) Aldila Sutjiadi
July 12	Almada, Portugal; Hard; W15; Singles and Doubles Draws	(United States) Alexa Graham; 6–1, 6–2	(Republic of Ireland) Georgia Drummy	(South Korea) Ku Yeon-woo (Brazil) Ingrid Gamarra Martins	(Norway) Melanie Stokke (France) Lucie Nguyen Tan (Japan) Mei Yamaguchi (Bulgaria) Julia Stamatova
July 12	Almada, Portugal; Hard; W15; Singles and Doubles Draws	(Brazil) Ingrid Gamarra Martins (Spain) Olga Parres Azcoitia; 4–6, 6–3, [10–8]	(France) Océane Babel (France) Lucie Nguyen Tan	(South Korea) Ku Yeon-woo (Brazil) Ingrid Gamarra Martins	(Norway) Melanie Stokke (France) Lucie Nguyen Tan (Japan) Mei Yamaguchi (Bulgaria) Julia Stamatova
July 12	Monastir, Tunisia; Hard; W15; Singles and Doubles Draws	(Belgium) Eliessa Vanlangendonck; 6–3, 6–4	(France) Tiphanie Fiquet	(Japan) Ayumi Koshiishi (France) Julie Belgraver	(United States) Solymar Colling (Tunisia) Chiraz Bechri (France) Aubane Droguet (Russia) Maria Kozyreva
July 12	Monastir, Tunisia; Hard; W15; Singles and Doubles Draws	(United States) Dalayna Hewitt (United States) Alana Smith; 6–4, 6–2	(Japan) Ayumi Koshiishi (Japan) Michika Ozeki	(Japan) Ayumi Koshiishi (France) Julie Belgraver	(United States) Solymar Colling (Tunisia) Chiraz Bechri (France) Aubane Droguet (Russia) Maria Kozyreva
July 19	ITS Cup; Olomouc, Czech Republic; Clay; W60; Singles Draw – Doubles Draw	(Czech Republic) Sára Bejlek; 6–0, 6–0	(Argentina) Paula Ormaechea	(Hungary) Panna Udvardy (United Kingdom) Francesca Jones	(Germany) Anna Zaja (Australia) Jaimee Fourlis (France) Diane Parry (Slovenia) Nika Radišić
July 19	ITS Cup; Olomouc, Czech Republic; Clay; W60; Singles Draw – Doubles Draw	(United States) Jessie Aney (Czech Republic) Anna Sisková; 6–1, 6–0	(Chile) Bárbara Gatica (Brazil) Rebeca Pereira	(Hungary) Panna Udvardy (United Kingdom) Francesca Jones	(Germany) Anna Zaja (Australia) Jaimee Fourlis (France) Diane Parry (Slovenia) Nika Radišić
July 19	Les Contamines-Montjoie, France; Hard; W25; Singles and Doubles Draws	(Switzerland) Ylena In-Albon; 4–6, 7–5, 7–5	(United Kingdom) Jodie Burrage	(United States) Elysia Bolton (France) Léolia Jeanjean	(France) Alice Tubello (United Kingdom) Naiktha Bains (France) Émeline Dartron (Japan) Haruka Kaji
July 19	Les Contamines-Montjoie, France; Hard; W25; Singles and Doubles Draws	(Latvia) Diāna Marcinkēviča (United States) Chiara Scholl; 3–6, 6–2, [10–7]	(Argentina) María Lourdes Carlé (Switzerland) Ylena In-Albon	(United States) Elysia Bolton (France) Léolia Jeanjean	(France) Alice Tubello (United Kingdom) Naiktha Bains (France) Émeline Dartron (Japan) Haruka Kaji
July 19	Telavi Open; Telavi, Georgia; Clay; W25; Singles and Doubles Draws	(Greece) Valentini Grammatikopoulou; 7–5, 6–4	(France) Tessah Andrianjafitrimo	(Bosnia and Herzegovina) Dea Herdželaš (Mexico) Fernanda Contreras	(Russia) Darya Astakhova (Japan) Kyōka Okamura (Israel) Shavit Kimchi (Lithuania) Justina Mikulskytė
July 19	Telavi Open; Telavi, Georgia; Clay; W25; Singles and Doubles Draws	(Netherlands) Eva Vedder (Netherlands) Stéphanie Visscher; 3–6, 6–4, [13–11]	(Argentina) Victoria Bosio (Italy) Angelica Moratelli	(Bosnia and Herzegovina) Dea Herdželaš (Mexico) Fernanda Contreras	(Russia) Darya Astakhova (Japan) Kyōka Okamura (Israel) Shavit Kimchi (Lithuania) Justina Mikulskytė
July 19	Kyiv, Ukraine; Clay; W25; Singles and Doubles Draws	(France) Chloé Paquet; 7–6^{(7–3)}, 3–6, 6–4	(Hungary) Fanny Stollár	(Czech Republic) Michaela Bayerlová (France) Carole Monnet	(South Korea) Jang Su-jeong (Italy) Linda Salvi (Romania) Irina Fetecău (Ukraine) Anastasiya Soboleva
July 19	Kyiv, Ukraine; Clay; W25; Singles and Doubles Draws	(South Korea) Jang Su-jeong (Serbia) Bojana Marinković; 3–6, 6–4, [10–7]	(United Kingdom) Ali Collins (Venezuela) Andrea Gámiz	(Czech Republic) Michaela Bayerlová (France) Carole Monnet	(South Korea) Jang Su-jeong (Italy) Linda Salvi (Romania) Irina Fetecău (Ukraine) Anastasiya Soboleva
July 19	Cairo, Egypt; Clay; W15; Singles and Doubles Draws	(Spain) Leyre Romero Gormaz; 7–5, 7–6^{(7–4)}	(Australia) Tina Nadine Smith	(Spain) Claudia Hoste Ferrer (Russia) Anastasia Sukhotina	(Spain) Ana Lantigua de la Nuez (Netherlands) Jasmijn Gimbrère (Egypt) Lamis Alhussein Abdel Aziz (Morocco) Aya El Aouni
July 19	Cairo, Egypt; Clay; W15; Singles and Doubles Draws	(Spain) Claudia Hoste Ferrer (Spain) Leyre Romero Gormaz; 6–1, 4–6, [11–9]	(Netherlands) Jasmijn Gimbrère (Netherlands) Demi Tran	(Spain) Claudia Hoste Ferrer (Russia) Anastasia Sukhotina	(Spain) Ana Lantigua de la Nuez (Netherlands) Jasmijn Gimbrère (Egypt) Lamis Alhussein Abdel Aziz (Morocco) Aya El Aouni
July 19	Amarante, Portugal; Hard; W15; Singles and Doubles Draws	(Japan) Mei Yamaguchi; 6–4, 3–6, 6–4	(Italy) Federica Rossi	(Spain) Ángela Fita Boluda (Bulgaria) Julia Stamatova	(Brazil) Ingrid Gamarra Martins (Sweden) Julita Saner (Spain) Alba Carrillo Marín (France) Lucie Nguyen Tan
July 19	Amarante, Portugal; Hard; W15; Singles and Doubles Draws	(France) Océane Babel (France) Lucie Nguyen Tan; 6–4, 6–2	(Indonesia) Priska Madelyn Nugroho (Italy) Federica Rossi	(Spain) Ángela Fita Boluda (Bulgaria) Julia Stamatova	(Brazil) Ingrid Gamarra Martins (Sweden) Julita Saner (Spain) Alba Carrillo Marín (France) Lucie Nguyen Tan
July 19	Moscow, Russia; Clay; W15; Singles and Doubles Draws	(Uzbekistan) Nigina Abduraimova; 6–1, 6–1	(Russia) Maria Shusharina	(Russia) Anna Zyryanova (Russia) Anna Morgina	(Russia) Eva Garkusha (Russia) Erika Andreeva (Russia) Anna Ureke (Russia) Aleksandra Pospelova
July 19	Moscow, Russia; Clay; W15; Singles and Doubles Draws	(Russia) Daria Mishina (Russia) Anna Morgina; 7–5, 2–6, [11–9]	(Uzbekistan) Nigina Abduraimova (Russia) Angelina Gabueva	(Russia) Anna Zyryanova (Russia) Anna Morgina	(Russia) Eva Garkusha (Russia) Erika Andreeva (Russia) Anna Ureke (Russia) Aleksandra Pospelova
July 19	Don Benito, Spain; Carpet; W15; Singles and Doubles Draws	(Spain) Olga Parres Azcoitia; 2–6, 6–3, 6–4	(Germany) Angelina Wirges	(France) Nahia Berecoechea (Spain) María Dolores López Martínez	(United States) Erica Oosterhout (United States) Isabella Harvison (Russia) Nina Rudiukova (Austria) Tamira Paszek
July 19	Don Benito, Spain; Carpet; W15; Singles and Doubles Draws	(Spain) Lucía Cortez Llorca (Spain) Olga Parres Azcoitia; 6–4, 6–3	(Austria) Tamara Kostic (United States) Erica Oosterhout	(France) Nahia Berecoechea (Spain) María Dolores López Martínez	(United States) Erica Oosterhout (United States) Isabella Harvison (Russia) Nina Rudiukova (Austria) Tamira Paszek
July 19	Monastir, Tunisia; Hard; W15; Singles and Doubles Draws	(United States) Dalayna Hewitt; 6–4, 6–4	(Japan) Ayumi Koshiishi	(United States) Solymar Colling (France) Tiphanie Fiquet	(United States) Katja Wiersholm (Argentina) Julia Riera (Belgium) Eliessa Vanlangendonck (France) Aubane Droguet
July 19	Monastir, Tunisia; Hard; W15; Singles and Doubles Draws	(France) Tiphanie Fiquet (Lithuania) Akvilė Paražinskaitė; 7–5, 4–6, [10–8]	(Croatia) Mariana Dražić (United States) Anastasia Nefedova	(United States) Solymar Colling (France) Tiphanie Fiquet	(United States) Katja Wiersholm (Argentina) Julia Riera (Belgium) Eliessa Vanlangendonck (France) Aubane Droguet
July 26	Reinert Open; Versmold, Germany; Clay; W60; Singles Draw – Doubles Draw	(Russia) Elina Avanesyan; 6–7^{(4–7)}, 6–2, 6–2	(Italy) Federica Di Sarra	(Sweden) Mirjam Björklund (Italy) Cristiana Ferrando	(Kazakhstan) Anna Danilina (Latvia) Kamilla Bartone (Australia) Jaimee Fourlis (Germany) Anna Zaja
July 26	Reinert Open; Versmold, Germany; Clay; W60; Singles Draw – Doubles Draw	(Kazakhstan) Anna Danilina (Ukraine) Valeriya Strakhova; 4–6, 7–5, [10–4]	(Sweden) Mirjam Björklund (Australia) Jaimee Fourlis	(Sweden) Mirjam Björklund (Italy) Cristiana Ferrando	(Kazakhstan) Anna Danilina (Latvia) Kamilla Bartone (Australia) Jaimee Fourlis (Germany) Anna Zaja
July 26	Kozerki Open; Grodzisk Mazowiecki, Poland; Clay; W60; Singles Draw – Doubles Draw	(Georgia (country)) Ekaterine Gorgodze; 7–6^{(9–7)}, 0–6, 6–4	(France) Chloé Paquet	(France) Tessah Andrianjafitrimo (Chile) Bárbara Gatica	(Hungary) Dalma Gálfi (Greece) Despina Papamichail (South Korea) Jang Su-jeong (Russia) Anastasia Zakharova
July 26	Kozerki Open; Grodzisk Mazowiecki, Poland; Clay; W60; Singles Draw – Doubles Draw	(Chile) Bárbara Gatica (Brazil) Rebeca Pereira; 6–3, 6–1	(South Korea) Jang Su-jeong (Chinese Taipei) Lee Ya-hsuan	(France) Tessah Andrianjafitrimo (Chile) Bárbara Gatica	(Hungary) Dalma Gálfi (Greece) Despina Papamichail (South Korea) Jang Su-jeong (Russia) Anastasia Zakharova
July 26	Knokke, Belgium; Clay; W15; Singles and Doubles Draws	(France) Séléna Janicijevic; 6–3, 7–6^{(7–0)}	(France) Lucie Nguyen Tan	(Austria) Sinja Kraus (Germany) Natalia Siedliska	(France) Margaux Rouvroy (France) Émeline Dartron (Czech Republic) Michaela Bayerlová (Sweden) Jacqueline Cabaj Awad
July 26	Knokke, Belgium; Clay; W15; Singles and Doubles Draws	(France) Émeline Dartron (France) Margaux Rouvroy; 6–1, 6–3	(France) Anaëlle Leclercq (France) Lucie Nguyen Tan	(Austria) Sinja Kraus (Germany) Natalia Siedliska	(France) Margaux Rouvroy (France) Émeline Dartron (Czech Republic) Michaela Bayerlová (Sweden) Jacqueline Cabaj Awad
July 26	Vejle, Denmark; Clay; W15; Singles and Doubles Draws	(Denmark) Johanne Svendsen; 2–6, 6–4, 6–1	(South Korea) Park So-hyun	(Germany) Jantje Tilbürger (Indonesia) Priska Madelyn Nugroho	(Germany) Lena Ruppert (United States) Taylor Ng (Czech Republic) Darja Viďmanová (France) Alice Robbe
July 26	Vejle, Denmark; Clay; W15; Singles and Doubles Draws	(Israel) Nicole Khirin (Czech Republic) Darja Viďmanová; 7–6^{(9–7)}, 5–7, [10–8]	(Ukraine) Viktoriia Dema (Japan) Eri Shimizu	(Germany) Jantje Tilbürger (Indonesia) Priska Madelyn Nugroho	(Germany) Lena Ruppert (United States) Taylor Ng (Czech Republic) Darja Viďmanová (France) Alice Robbe
July 26	Cairo, Egypt; Clay; W15; Singles and Doubles Draws	(Spain) Leyre Romero Gormaz; 6–2, 6–3	(Germany) Luisa Meyer auf der Heide	(Egypt) Sandra Samir (Kazakhstan) Zhibek Kulambayeva	(Russia) Anastasia Sukhotina (Romania) Oana Gavrilă (Ecuador) Mell Reasco (Egypt) Lamis Alhussein Abdel Aziz
July 26	Cairo, Egypt; Clay; W15; Singles and Doubles Draws	(Kazakhstan) Zhibek Kulambayeva (Russia) Anastasia Sukhotina; 6–0, 6–0	(Ecuador) Mell Reasco (Slovakia) Alica Rusová	(Egypt) Sandra Samir (Kazakhstan) Zhibek Kulambayeva	(Russia) Anastasia Sukhotina (Romania) Oana Gavrilă (Ecuador) Mell Reasco (Egypt) Lamis Alhussein Abdel Aziz
July 26	Savitaipale, Finland; Clay; W15; Singles and Doubles Draws	(Estonia) Elena Malõgina; 4–6, 7–6^{(7–3)}, 6–2	(Germany) Emily Seibold	(Switzerland) Valentina Ryser (Norway) Astrid Wanja Brune Olsen	(Estonia) Maria Lota Kaul (United Kingdom) Emilie Lindh (Russia) Polina Bakhmutkina (Finland) Oona Orpana
July 26	Savitaipale, Finland; Clay; W15; Singles and Doubles Draws	(Switzerland) Marie Mettraux (Switzerland) Valentina Ryser; 6–4, 7–5	(Germany) Emily Seibold (Russia) Anna Ureke	(Switzerland) Valentina Ryser (Norway) Astrid Wanja Brune Olsen	(Estonia) Maria Lota Kaul (United Kingdom) Emilie Lindh (Russia) Polina Bakhmutkina (Finland) Oona Orpana
July 26	Cordenons, Italy; Clay; W15; Singles and Doubles Draws	(Japan) Mana Kawamura; 7–6^{(9–7)}, 7–5	(Slovenia) Veronika Erjavec	(Italy) Aurora Zantedeschi (Italy) Nicole Fossa Huergo	(Italy) Stefania Rubini (Bosnia and Herzegovina) Nefisa Berberović (Italy) Anna Turati (Italy) Martina Colmegna
July 26	Cordenons, Italy; Clay; W15; Singles and Doubles Draws	(Italy) Martina Colmegna (United States) Amy Zhu; 6–4, 6–3	(Bosnia and Herzegovina) Nefisa Berberović (Slovenia) Veronika Erjavec	(Italy) Aurora Zantedeschi (Italy) Nicole Fossa Huergo	(Italy) Stefania Rubini (Bosnia and Herzegovina) Nefisa Berberović (Italy) Anna Turati (Italy) Martina Colmegna
July 26	Monastir, Tunisia; Hard; W15; Singles and Doubles Draws	(Japan) Ayumi Koshiishi; 6–1, 6–0	(Belgium) Eliessa Vanlangendonck	(United States) Jessica Failla (Lithuania) Akvilė Paražinskaitė	(United States) Dasha Ivanova (Croatia) Mariana Dražić (Japan) Miyabi Inoue (Serbia) Katarina Kozarov
July 26	Monastir, Tunisia; Hard; W15; Singles and Doubles Draws	(Serbia) Katarina Kozarov (United States) Lauren Proctor; 6–1, 3–6, [10–5]	(United States) Anastasia Nefedova (Italy) Angelica Raggi	(United States) Jessica Failla (Lithuania) Akvilė Paražinskaitė	(United States) Dasha Ivanova (Croatia) Mariana Dražić (Japan) Miyabi Inoue (Serbia) Katarina Kozarov

=== August ===
Week of	Tournament	Winner	Runners-up	Semifinalists	Quarterfinalists
August 2	Pärnu, Estonia; Clay; W25; Singles and Doubles Draws	(Estonia) Kaia Kanepi; 7–5, 6–4	(Czech Republic) Anna Sisková	(Turkey) Berfu Cengiz (Croatia) Oleksandra Oliynykova	(Austria) Sinja Kraus (Slovakia) Viktória Morvayová (Lithuania) Justina Mikulskytė (Italy) Giulia Gatto-Monticone
August 2	Pärnu, Estonia; Clay; W25; Singles and Doubles Draws	(Lithuania) Justina Mikulskytė (Czech Republic) Anna Sisková; 6–7^{(5–7)}, 6–3, [10–5]	(India) Rutuja Bhosale (Belgium) Magali Kempen	(Turkey) Berfu Cengiz (Croatia) Oleksandra Oliynykova	(Austria) Sinja Kraus (Slovakia) Viktória Morvayová (Lithuania) Justina Mikulskytė (Italy) Giulia Gatto-Monticone
August 2	Pescara, Italy; Clay; W25; Singles and Doubles Draws	(Italy) Anastasia Grymalska; 2–6, 7–6^{(7–4)}, 6–3	(Italy) Anna Turati	(Colombia) Emiliana Arango (Argentina) María Lourdes Carlé	(Andorra) Victoria Jiménez Kasintseva (Italy) Aurora Zantedeschi (Bosnia and Herzegovina) Nefisa Berberović (Spain) Ángela Fita Boluda
August 2	Pescara, Italy; Clay; W25; Singles and Doubles Draws	(Romania) Cristina Dinu (Romania) Ioana Loredana Roșca; 6–2, 5–7, [10–3]	(Argentina) Victoria Bosio (Italy) Angelica Moratelli	(Colombia) Emiliana Arango (Argentina) María Lourdes Carlé	(Andorra) Victoria Jiménez Kasintseva (Italy) Aurora Zantedeschi (Bosnia and Herzegovina) Nefisa Berberović (Spain) Ángela Fita Boluda
August 2	Bydgoszcz, Poland; Clay; W25; Singles and Doubles Draws	(Germany) Nastasja Schunk; 4–6, 6–2, 6–0	(Russia) Darya Astakhova	(Germany) Katharina Gerlach (Czech Republic) Tereza Smitková	(Slovenia) Nina Potočnik (France) Carole Monnet (Romania) Andreea Prisăcariu (Russia) Anastasia Zakharova
August 2	Bydgoszcz, Poland; Clay; W25; Singles and Doubles Draws	(Brazil) Carolina Alves (Belarus) Iryna Shymanovich; 6–1, 3–6, [10–5]	(Japan) Hiroko Kuwata (Colombia) Yuliana Lizarazo	(Germany) Katharina Gerlach (Czech Republic) Tereza Smitková	(Slovenia) Nina Potočnik (France) Carole Monnet (Romania) Andreea Prisăcariu (Russia) Anastasia Zakharova
August 2	Frederiksberg, Denmark; Clay; W15; Singles and Doubles Draws	(Czech Republic) Michaela Bayerlová; 6–1, 6–1	(Israel) Nicole Khirin	(France) Alice Robbe (Germany) Lena Ruppert	(South Korea) Park So-hyun (United States) Taylor Ng (Denmark) Sofia Samavati (Denmark) Johanne Svendsen
August 2	Frederiksberg, Denmark; Clay; W15; Singles and Doubles Draws	(Indonesia) Priska Madelyn Nugroho (Japan) Naho Sato; 6–0, 6–1	(Ukraine) Viktoriia Dema (Bulgaria) Ani Vangelova	(France) Alice Robbe (Germany) Lena Ruppert	(South Korea) Park So-hyun (United States) Taylor Ng (Denmark) Sofia Samavati (Denmark) Johanne Svendsen
August 2	Cairo, Egypt; Clay; W15; Singles and Doubles Draws	(Australia) Tina Nadine Smith; 6–0, 6–2	(Italy) Diletta Cherubini	(Egypt) Sandra Samir (Slovakia) Barbora Matúšová	(Egypt) Yasmin Ezzat (Egypt) Lamis Alhussein Abdel Aziz (Ecuador) Mell Reasco (Kazakhstan) Zhibek Kulambayeva
August 2	Cairo, Egypt; Clay; W15; Singles and Doubles Draws	(Kazakhstan) Zhibek Kulambayeva (Egypt) Sandra Samir; 7–5, 6–3	(Colombia) María Paulina Pérez (Ecuador) Mell Reasco	(Egypt) Sandra Samir (Slovakia) Barbora Matúšová	(Egypt) Yasmin Ezzat (Egypt) Lamis Alhussein Abdel Aziz (Ecuador) Mell Reasco (Kazakhstan) Zhibek Kulambayeva
August 2	Monastir, Tunisia; Hard; W15; Singles and Doubles Draws	(Denmark) Olga Helmi; 6–0, 6–3	(Lithuania) Akvilė Paražinskaitė	(Ukraine) Ganna Poznikhirenko (Japan) Ayumi Koshiishi	(Spain) Noelia Bouzó Zanotti (United States) Lauren Proctor (United States) Anastasia Nefedova (United States) Raveena Kingsley
August 2	Monastir, Tunisia; Hard; W15; Singles and Doubles Draws	(France) Tiphanie Fiquet (Lithuania) Akvilė Paražinskaitė; 6–2, 6–1	(Spain) Noelia Bouzó Zanotti (Bolivia) Noelia Zeballos	(Ukraine) Ganna Poznikhirenko (Japan) Ayumi Koshiishi	(Spain) Noelia Bouzó Zanotti (United States) Lauren Proctor (United States) Anastasia Nefedova (United States) Raveena Kingsley
August 9	Koser Jewelers Tennis Challenge; Landisville, United States; Hard; W100; Singles Draw – Doubles Draw	(Spain) Nuria Párrizas Díaz; 7–6^{(8–6)}, 4–6, 7–6^{(9–7)}	(Belgium) Greet Minnen	(Netherlands) Lesley Pattinama Kerkhove (Poland) Katarzyna Kawa	(Brazil) Beatriz Haddad Maia (United States) Caty McNally (United Kingdom) Emma Raducanu (Poland) Magdalena Fręch
August 9	Koser Jewelers Tennis Challenge; Landisville, United States; Hard; W100; Singles Draw – Doubles Draw	(United States) Hanna Chang (United States) Alexa Glatch; 7–6^{(7–3)}, 3–6, [11–9]	(United Kingdom) Samantha Murray Sharan (Russia) Valeria Savinykh	(Netherlands) Lesley Pattinama Kerkhove (Poland) Katarzyna Kawa	(Brazil) Beatriz Haddad Maia (United States) Caty McNally (United Kingdom) Emma Raducanu (Poland) Magdalena Fręch
August 9	ITF World Tennis Tour Gran Canaria; San Bartolomé de Tirajana, Spain; Clay; W60; Singles Draw – Doubles Draw	(Netherlands) Arantxa Rus; 6–4, 6–2	(Egypt) Mayar Sherif	(Russia) Elina Avanesyan (Serbia) Aleksandra Krunić	(France) Diane Parry (Spain) Jéssica Bouzas Maneiro (Romania) Jaqueline Cristian (Russia) Oksana Selekhmeteva
August 9	ITF World Tennis Tour Gran Canaria; San Bartolomé de Tirajana, Spain; Clay; W60; Singles Draw – Doubles Draw	(Russia) Elina Avanesyan (Russia) Oksana Selekhmeteva; 7–5, 6–2	(Netherlands) Arianne Hartono (Australia) Olivia Tjandramulia	(Russia) Elina Avanesyan (Serbia) Aleksandra Krunić	(France) Diane Parry (Spain) Jéssica Bouzas Maneiro (Romania) Jaqueline Cristian (Russia) Oksana Selekhmeteva
August 9	Koksijde, Belgium; Clay; W25; Singles and Doubles Draws	(Sweden) Mirjam Björklund; 7–6^{(8–6)}, 6–3	(Bosnia and Herzegovina) Dea Herdželaš	(Burundi) Sada Nahimana (Belgium) Magali Kempen	(Netherlands) Merel Hoedt (Romania) Alexandra Ignatik (Germany) Katharina Hobgarski (Spain) Ángela Fita Boluda
August 9	Koksijde, Belgium; Clay; W25; Singles and Doubles Draws	(North Macedonia) Lina Gjorcheska (Ukraine) Valeriya Strakhova; 6–4, 6–4	(Greece) Valentini Grammatikopoulou (Russia) Valentina Ivakhnenko	(Burundi) Sada Nahimana (Belgium) Magali Kempen	(Netherlands) Merel Hoedt (Romania) Alexandra Ignatik (Germany) Katharina Hobgarski (Spain) Ángela Fita Boluda
August 9	Radom, Poland; Clay; W25; Singles and Doubles Draws	(Italy) Lucrezia Stefanini; 4–6, 6–2, 6–3	(Czech Republic) Miriam Kolodziejová	(Russia) Anastasia Zakharova (Belarus) Iryna Shymanovich	(Slovakia) Viktória Kužmová (Brazil) Carolina Alves (Hungary) Anna Bondár (Hungary) Réka Luca Jani
August 9	Radom, Poland; Clay; W25; Singles and Doubles Draws	(Japan) Mana Kawamura (Japan) Funa Kozaki; 6–4, 6–2	(Brazil) Carolina Alves (Belarus) Iryna Shymanovich	(Russia) Anastasia Zakharova (Belarus) Iryna Shymanovich	(Slovakia) Viktória Kužmová (Brazil) Carolina Alves (Hungary) Anna Bondár (Hungary) Réka Luca Jani
August 9	Bratislava, Slovakia; Clay; W15; Singles and Doubles Draws	(Latvia) Darja Semenistaja; 6–4, 6–3	(Slovenia) Pia Lovrič	(Switzerland) Lara Michel (Slovakia) Radka Zelníčková	(Russia) Victoria Kan (Hungary) Adrienn Nagy (Japan) Eri Shimizu (Colombia) María Herazo González
August 9	Bratislava, Slovakia; Clay; W15; Singles and Doubles Draws	(Slovakia) Chantal Škamlová (Slovakia) Radka Zelníčková; 6–3, 7–6^{(7–5)}	(Slovenia) Pia Lovrič (Hungary) Adrienn Nagy	(Switzerland) Lara Michel (Slovakia) Radka Zelníčková	(Russia) Victoria Kan (Hungary) Adrienn Nagy (Japan) Eri Shimizu (Colombia) María Herazo González
August 9	Monastir, Tunisia; Hard; W15; Singles and Doubles Draws	(Japan) Ayumi Koshiishi; 6–3, 7–6^{(7–3)}	(Japan) Himeno Sakatsume	(United States) Lauren Proctor (Lithuania) Akvilė Paražinskaitė	(United States) Raveena Kingsley (United States) Dasha Ivanova (Spain) Noelia Bouzó Zanotti (France) Tiphanie Fiquet
August 9	Monastir, Tunisia; Hard; W15; Singles and Doubles Draws	(France) Tiphanie Fiquet (Lithuania) Akvilė Paražinskaitė; 4–6, 6–1, [10–6]	(Japan) Ayumi Koshiishi (United States) Anastasia Nefedova	(United States) Lauren Proctor (Lithuania) Akvilė Paražinskaitė	(United States) Raveena Kingsley (United States) Dasha Ivanova (Spain) Noelia Bouzó Zanotti (France) Tiphanie Fiquet
August 16	ITF World Tennis Tour Maspalomas; San Bartolomé de Tirajana, Spain; Clay; W60; Singles Draw – Doubles Draw	(Netherlands) Arantxa Rus; 6–0, 6–1	(Andorra) Victoria Jiménez Kasintseva	(Austria) Julia Grabher (France) Diane Parry	(Romania) Ilona Georgiana Ghioroaie (France) Carole Monnet (Italy) Martina Di Giuseppe (Serbia) Aleksandra Krunić
August 16	ITF World Tennis Tour Maspalomas; San Bartolomé de Tirajana, Spain; Clay; W60; Singles Draw – Doubles Draw	(Netherlands) Arianne Hartono (Australia) Olivia Tjandramulia; 6–4, 2–6, [10–7]	(Argentina) María Lourdes Carlé (Argentina) Julieta Estable	(Austria) Julia Grabher (France) Diane Parry	(Romania) Ilona Georgiana Ghioroaie (France) Carole Monnet (Italy) Martina Di Giuseppe (Serbia) Aleksandra Krunić
August 16	Oldenzaal, Netherlands; Clay; W25; Singles and Doubles Draws	(South Korea) Jang Su-jeong; 6–3, 6–2	(Norway) Malene Helgø	(France) Salma Djoubri (Czech Republic) Johana Marková	(Russia) Ekaterina Makarova (Russia) Vlada Koval (France) Alice Tubello (Romania) Alexandra Ignatik
August 16	Oldenzaal, Netherlands; Clay; W25; Singles and Doubles Draws	(Japan) Kanako Morisaki (Japan) Erika Sema; 5–7, 6–3, [10–7]	(Netherlands) Eva Vedder (Netherlands) Stéphanie Visscher	(France) Salma Djoubri (Czech Republic) Johana Marková	(Russia) Ekaterina Makarova (Russia) Vlada Koval (France) Alice Tubello (Romania) Alexandra Ignatik
August 16	Vrnjačka Banja, Serbia; Clay; W25; Singles and Doubles Draws	(Romania) Cristina Dinu; 6–1, 7–5	(Czech Republic) Anna Sisková	(Slovenia) Nina Potočnik (Russia) Polina Leykina	(Bosnia and Herzegovina) Nefisa Berberović (Romania) Ioana Loredana Roșca (North Macedonia) Lina Gjorcheska (Egypt) Sandra Samir
August 16	Vrnjačka Banja, Serbia; Clay; W25; Singles and Doubles Draws	(Brazil) Carolina Alves (Venezuela) Andrea Gámiz; 6–4, 6–1	(Romania) Ioana Loredana Roșca (Egypt) Sandra Samir	(Slovenia) Nina Potočnik (Russia) Polina Leykina	(Bosnia and Herzegovina) Nefisa Berberović (Romania) Ioana Loredana Roșca (North Macedonia) Lina Gjorcheska (Egypt) Sandra Samir
August 16	Ourense, Spain; Hard; W25; Singles and Doubles Draws	(Australia) Jaimee Fourlis; 7–6^{(7–3)}, 6–3	(Hungary) Fanny Stollár	(Australia) Olivia Gadecki (Spain) Yvonne Cavallé Reimers	(Denmark) Olga Helmi (Chinese Taipei) Lee Ya-hsuan (United States) Jessica Failla (Spain) Celia Cerviño Ruiz
August 16	Ourense, Spain; Hard; W25; Singles and Doubles Draws	(Chinese Taipei) Lee Ya-hsuan (Russia) Ekaterina Yashina; 6–2, 6–3	(Spain) Alba Carrillo Marín (Lithuania) Justina Mikulskytė	(Australia) Olivia Gadecki (Spain) Yvonne Cavallé Reimers	(Denmark) Olga Helmi (Chinese Taipei) Lee Ya-hsuan (United States) Jessica Failla (Spain) Celia Cerviño Ruiz
August 16	Warmbad-Villach, Austria; Clay; W15; Singles and Doubles Draws	(Italy) Anna Turati; 6–3, 6–2	(Slovenia) Pia Lovrič	(Czech Republic) Veronika Vlkovská (South Korea) Ku Yeon-woo	(Italy) Melania Delai (Indonesia) Priska Madelyn Nugroho (Slovakia) Katarína Kužmová (Sweden) Caijsa Hennemann
August 16	Warmbad-Villach, Austria; Clay; W15; Singles and Doubles Draws	(Italy) Melania Delai (Slovenia) Pia Lovrič; 0–6, 6–2, [10–3]	(Bosnia and Herzegovina) Anita Husarić (Russia) Aleksandra Pospelova	(Czech Republic) Veronika Vlkovská (South Korea) Ku Yeon-woo	(Italy) Melania Delai (Indonesia) Priska Madelyn Nugroho (Slovakia) Katarína Kužmová (Sweden) Caijsa Hennemann
August 16	Erwitte, Germany; Clay; W15; Singles and Doubles Draws	(Germany) Julia Middendorf; 3–6, 7–5, 6–2	(Denmark) Sofia Samavati	(Czech Republic) Aneta Kladivová (Germany) Emily Seibold	(Germany) Mara Guth (Germany) Angelina Wirges (Germany) Fabienne Gettwart (Malta) Helene Pellicano
August 16	Erwitte, Germany; Clay; W15; Singles and Doubles Draws	(Germany) Katharina Hering (Germany) Natalia Siedliska; 6–1, 7–5	(Germany) Carolina Kuhl (Germany) Angelina Wirges	(Czech Republic) Aneta Kladivová (Germany) Emily Seibold	(Germany) Mara Guth (Germany) Angelina Wirges (Germany) Fabienne Gettwart (Malta) Helene Pellicano
August 16	Monastir, Tunisia; Hard; W15; Singles and Doubles Draws	(Japan) Ayumi Koshiishi; 6–7^{(3–7)}, 7–6^{(7–2)}, 6–1	(Russia) Ekaterina Reyngold	(Argentina) Jazmín Ortenzi (Japan) Himeno Sakatsume	(Japan) Ramu Ueda (Japan) Sakura Hondo (Russia) Aglaya Fedorova (France) Evita Ramirez
August 16	Monastir, Tunisia; Hard; W15; Singles and Doubles Draws	(Argentina) Jazmín Ortenzi (Russia) Ekaterina Reyngold; 6–1, 6–1	(Italy) Asya Colombo (Italy) Beatrice Stagno	(Argentina) Jazmín Ortenzi (Japan) Himeno Sakatsume	(Japan) Ramu Ueda (Japan) Sakura Hondo (Russia) Aglaya Fedorova (France) Evita Ramirez
August 23	Zubr Cup; Přerov, Czech Republic; Clay; W60; Singles Draw – Doubles Draw	(Czech Republic) Linda Nosková; 6–7^{(2–7)}, 6–4, 6–3	(Romania) Alexandra Ignatik	(Czech Republic) Monika Kilnarová (Czech Republic) Dominika Šalková	(South Korea) Park So-hyun (Czech Republic) Tereza Smitková (Switzerland) Simona Waltert (Czech Republic) Sára Bejlek
August 23	Zubr Cup; Přerov, Czech Republic; Clay; W60; Singles Draw – Doubles Draw	(Brazil) Carolina Alves (United Kingdom) Sarah Beth Grey; 6–4, 3–6, [13–11]	(Japan) Mana Kawamura (Japan) Funa Kozaki	(Czech Republic) Monika Kilnarová (Czech Republic) Dominika Šalková	(South Korea) Park So-hyun (Czech Republic) Tereza Smitková (Switzerland) Simona Waltert (Czech Republic) Sára Bejlek
August 23	Braunschweig, Germany; Clay; W25; Singles and Doubles Draws	(Germany) Nastasja Schunk; 6–3, 6–1	(Germany) Anna Klasen	(Slovenia) Dalila Jakupović (Germany) Katharina Hobgarski	(Germany) Lena Papadakis (Germany) Tayisiya Morderger (Ukraine) Valeriya Strakhova (Argentina) María Lourdes Carlé
August 23	Braunschweig, Germany; Clay; W25; Singles and Doubles Draws	(Germany) Katharina Hobgarski (Ukraine) Valeriya Strakhova; 3–6, 6–2, [12–10]	(Austria) Tamira Paszek (United States) Chiara Scholl	(Slovenia) Dalila Jakupović (Germany) Katharina Hobgarski	(Germany) Lena Papadakis (Germany) Tayisiya Morderger (Ukraine) Valeriya Strakhova (Argentina) María Lourdes Carlé
August 23	Almaty, Kazakhstan; Clay; W25; Singles and Doubles Draws	(Belarus) Iryna Shymanovich; 6–3, 6–2	(Belarus) Vera Lapko	(Russia) Anastasia Tikhonova (Uzbekistan) Nigina Abduraimova	(Russia) Daria Mishina (Kazakhstan) Gozal Ainitdinova (Belarus) Shalimar Talbi (Kazakhstan) Zhibek Kulambayeva
August 23	Almaty, Kazakhstan; Clay; W25; Singles and Doubles Draws	(Uzbekistan) Nigina Abduraimova (Russia) Daria Mishina; 4–6, 6–4, [10–3]	(Uzbekistan) Sabina Sharipova (Netherlands) Stéphanie Visscher	(Russia) Anastasia Tikhonova (Uzbekistan) Nigina Abduraimova	(Russia) Daria Mishina (Kazakhstan) Gozal Ainitdinova (Belarus) Shalimar Talbi (Kazakhstan) Zhibek Kulambayeva
August 23	Vigo, Spain; Hard; W25; Singles and Doubles Draws	(Australia) Olivia Gadecki; 6–2, 6–4	(Japan) Yuriko Lily Miyazaki	(Japan) Sakura Hosogi (Chinese Taipei) Lee Ya-hsuan	(Switzerland) Conny Perrin (United States) Jessica Failla (Brazil) Laura Pigossi (Finland) Anastasia Kulikova
August 23	Vigo, Spain; Hard; W25; Singles and Doubles Draws	(United Kingdom) Alicia Barnett (Australia) Olivia Gadecki; 6–3, 6–2	(Switzerland) Conny Perrin (Brazil) Laura Pigossi	(Japan) Sakura Hosogi (Chinese Taipei) Lee Ya-hsuan	(Switzerland) Conny Perrin (United States) Jessica Failla (Brazil) Laura Pigossi (Finland) Anastasia Kulikova
August 23	Verbier, Switzerland; Clay; W25; Singles and Doubles Draws	(Switzerland) Ylena In-Albon; 6–1, 6–4	(Russia) Erika Andreeva	(Switzerland) Joanne Züger (Italy) Dalila Spiteri	(Portugal) Francisca Jorge (Burundi) Sada Nahimana (Russia) Ekaterina Makarova (Switzerland) Sebastianna Scilipoti
August 23	Verbier, Switzerland; Clay; W25; Singles and Doubles Draws	(Russia) Erika Andreeva (Russia) Ekaterina Makarova; 7–6^{(7–2)}, 6–1	(Latvia) Diāna Marcinkēviča (Russia) Maria Timofeeva	(Switzerland) Joanne Züger (Italy) Dalila Spiteri	(Portugal) Francisca Jorge (Burundi) Sada Nahimana (Russia) Ekaterina Makarova (Switzerland) Sebastianna Scilipoti
August 23	Bad Waltersdorf, Austria; Clay; W15; Singles and Doubles Draws	(Croatia) Antonia Ružić; 6–2, 6–2	(Slovenia) Živa Falkner	(Greece) Sapfo Sakellaridi (South Korea) Ku Yeon-woo	(Italy) Anna Turati (Romania) Elena-Teodora Cadar (Slovakia) Katarína Kužmová (Italy) Melania Delai
August 23	Bad Waltersdorf, Austria; Clay; W15; Singles and Doubles Draws	(South Korea) Ku Yeon-woo (Indonesia) Priska Madelyn Nugroho; 6–4, 6–3	(Italy) Giulia Crescenzi (Italy) Arianna Zucchini	(Greece) Sapfo Sakellaridi (South Korea) Ku Yeon-woo	(Italy) Anna Turati (Romania) Elena-Teodora Cadar (Slovakia) Katarína Kužmová (Italy) Melania Delai
August 23	Wanfercée-Baulet, Belgium; Clay; W15; Singles and Doubles Draws	(Denmark) Sofia Samavati; 4–6, 6–3, 6–1	(Norway) Astrid Wanja Brune Olsen	(Germany) Silvia Ambrosio (Croatia) Oleksandra Oliynykova	(France) Nina Radovanovic (United Kingdom) Emily Arbuthnott (Spain) Carlota Martínez Círez (Croatia) Adriana Rajković
August 23	Wanfercée-Baulet, Belgium; Clay; W15; Singles and Doubles Draws	(United Kingdom) Emily Arbuthnott (Belgium) Chelsea Vanhoutte; 7–5, 6–4	(France) Flavie Brugnone (France) Lucie Wargnier	(Germany) Silvia Ambrosio (Croatia) Oleksandra Oliynykova	(France) Nina Radovanovic (United Kingdom) Emily Arbuthnott (Spain) Carlota Martínez Círez (Croatia) Adriana Rajković
August 23	Monastir, Tunisia; Hard; W15; Singles and Doubles Draws	(Japan) Moyuka Uchijima; 7–5, 6–2	(United States) Jenna DeFalco	(Italy) Beatrice Ricci (Bolivia) Noelia Zeballos	(United States) Hina Inoue (Japan) Nana Kawagishi (Japan) Himeno Sakatsume (Japan) Riko Sawayanagi
August 23	Monastir, Tunisia; Hard; W15; Singles and Doubles Draws	(Brazil) Ingrid Gamarra Martins (Argentina) Jazmín Ortenzi; 6–2, 6–0	(Japan) Sakura Hondo (Japan) Yuka Hosoki	(Italy) Beatrice Ricci (Bolivia) Noelia Zeballos	(United States) Hina Inoue (Japan) Nana Kawagishi (Japan) Himeno Sakatsume (Japan) Riko Sawayanagi
August 23	Chornomorsk, Ukraine; Clay; W15; Singles and Doubles Draws	(Latvia) Darja Semenistaja; 6–3, 6–2	(Italy) Nicole Fossa Huergo	(Ukraine) Anastasiya Lopata (Slovakia) Timea Jarušková	(Italy) Diletta Cherubini (Belarus) Anastasiya Komar (Turkey) Doğa Türkmen (Italy) Chiara Catini
August 23	Chornomorsk, Ukraine; Clay; W15; Singles and Doubles Draws	(Ukraine) Viktoriya Petrenko (Russia) Anastasia Zolotareva; 4–6, 6–2, [10–8]	(Ukraine) Mariia Bergen (Belarus) Anastasiya Komar	(Ukraine) Anastasiya Lopata (Slovakia) Timea Jarušková	(Italy) Diletta Cherubini (Belarus) Anastasiya Komar (Turkey) Doğa Türkmen (Italy) Chiara Catini
August 30	Kuchyně Gorenje Prague Open; Prague, Czech Republic; Clay; W60; Singles Draw – Doubles Draw	(Poland) Magdalena Fręch; 6–2, 6–1	(Czech Republic) Tereza Smitková	(France) Diane Parry (Latvia) Daniela Vismane	(Czech Republic) Linda Nosková (Israel) Lina Glushko (Slovakia) Rebecca Šramková (Czech Republic) Sára Bejlek
August 30	Kuchyně Gorenje Prague Open; Prague, Czech Republic; Clay; W60; Singles Draw – Doubles Draw	(Czech Republic) Miriam Kolodziejová (Czech Republic) Jesika Malečková; 6–3, 1–6, [10–2]	(Japan) Kanako Morisaki (Japan) Erika Sema	(France) Diane Parry (Latvia) Daniela Vismane	(Czech Republic) Linda Nosková (Israel) Lina Glushko (Slovakia) Rebecca Šramková (Czech Republic) Sára Bejlek
August 30	TCCB Open; Collonge-Bellerive, Switzerland; Clay; W60; Singles Draw – Doubles Draw	(Brazil) Beatriz Haddad Maia; 5–7, 6–1, 6–4	(Turkey) İpek Öz	(France) Amandine Hesse (Hungary) Anna Bondár	(Burundi) Sada Nahimana (France) Estelle Cascino (Switzerland) Conny Perrin (Switzerland) Joanne Züger
August 30	TCCB Open; Collonge-Bellerive, Switzerland; Clay; W60; Singles Draw – Doubles Draw	(Russia) Amina Anshba (Russia) Anastasia Gasanova; 6–1, 6–7^{(6–8)}, [10–8]	(France) Amandine Hesse (Germany) Tatjana Maria	(France) Amandine Hesse (Hungary) Anna Bondár	(Burundi) Sada Nahimana (France) Estelle Cascino (Switzerland) Conny Perrin (Switzerland) Joanne Züger
August 30	Vienna, Austria; Clay; W25; Singles and Doubles Draws	(Romania) Cristina Dinu; 6–3, 6–4	(Austria) Sinja Kraus	(France) Chloé Paquet (Russia) Erika Andreeva	(Colombia) María Herazo González (Italy) Anna Turati (Austria) Melanie Klaffner (Germany) Eva Lys
August 30	Vienna, Austria; Clay; W25; Singles and Doubles Draws	(Brazil) Carolina Alves (Poland) Martyna Kubka; 6–7^{(1–7)}, 6–4, [10–7]	(Russia) Erika Andreeva (Russia) Ekaterina Kazionova	(France) Chloé Paquet (Russia) Erika Andreeva	(Colombia) María Herazo González (Italy) Anna Turati (Austria) Melanie Klaffner (Germany) Eva Lys
August 30	Trieste, Italy; Clay; W25; Singles and Doubles Draws	(Croatia) Tara Würth; 3–6, 6–4, 7–5	(Sweden) Mirjam Björklund	(Lithuania) Justina Mikulskytė (Slovenia) Nina Potočnik	(Italy) Nuria Brancaccio (Romania) Oana Georgeta Simion (Slovenia) Nika Radišić (North Macedonia) Lina Gjorcheska
August 30	Trieste, Italy; Clay; W25; Singles and Doubles Draws	(Romania) Andreea Prisăcariu (Slovenia) Nika Radišić; 7–5, 6–2	(Lithuania) Justina Mikulskytė (Australia) Olivia Tjandramulia	(Lithuania) Justina Mikulskytė (Slovenia) Nina Potočnik	(Italy) Nuria Brancaccio (Romania) Oana Georgeta Simion (Slovenia) Nika Radišić (North Macedonia) Lina Gjorcheska
August 30	Marbella, Spain; Clay; W25; Singles and Doubles Draws	(South Korea) Park So-hyun; 6–1, 7–6^{(8–6)}	(Russia) Marina Melnikova	(Belarus) Anna Kubareva (Spain) Carlota Martínez Círez	(Spain) Leyre Romero Gormaz (France) Marine Partaud (Spain) Ángela Fita Boluda (Lithuania) Akvilė Paražinskaitė
August 30	Marbella, Spain; Clay; W25; Singles and Doubles Draws	(Spain) Yvonne Cavallé Reimers (Spain) Ángela Fita Boluda; 6–3, 6–2	(Canada) Bianca Fernandez (Spain) Ana Lantigua de la Nuez	(Belarus) Anna Kubareva (Spain) Carlota Martínez Círez	(Spain) Leyre Romero Gormaz (France) Marine Partaud (Spain) Ángela Fita Boluda (Lithuania) Akvilė Paražinskaitė
August 30	Cairo, Egypt; Clay; W15; Singles and Doubles Draws	(Russia) Anastasia Zolotareva; 6–4, 6–4	(United States) Anastasia Nefedova	(Romania) Lavinia Tănăsie (Bulgaria) Julia Stamatova	(Italy) Linda Salvi (Japan) Riko Sawayanagi (Italy) Giorgia Pinto (Italy) Irene Lavino
August 30	Cairo, Egypt; Clay; W15; Singles and Doubles Draws	(Italy) Giorgia Pinto (Italy) Gaia Squarcialupi; 6–4, 0–6, [10–5]	(United States) Anastasia Nefedova (Japan) Riko Sawayanagi	(Romania) Lavinia Tănăsie (Bulgaria) Julia Stamatova	(Italy) Linda Salvi (Japan) Riko Sawayanagi (Italy) Giorgia Pinto (Italy) Irene Lavino
August 30	Aix-en-Provence, France; Clay; W15; Singles and Doubles Draws	(France) Gaëlle Desperrier; 6–4, 6–3	(Russia) Maria Bondarenko	(France) Émeline Dartron (France) Lucie Nguyen Tan	(France) Audrey Albié (Turkey) Ayla Aksu (France) Margaux Rouvroy (France) Alice Tubello
August 30	Aix-en-Provence, France; Clay; W15; Singles and Doubles Draws	(France) Julie Belgraver (France) Léa Tholey; 6–1, 6–2	(Russia) Maria Bondarenko (South Korea) Ku Yeon-woo	(France) Émeline Dartron (France) Lucie Nguyen Tan	(France) Audrey Albié (Turkey) Ayla Aksu (France) Margaux Rouvroy (France) Alice Tubello
August 30	Monastir, Tunisia; Hard; W15; Singles and Doubles Draws	(Japan) Moyuka Uchijima; 6–1, 6–4	(Brazil) Ingrid Gamarra Martins	(China) Ma Yexin (Argentina) Jazmín Ortenzi	(France) Evita Ramirez (United States) Jenna DeFalco (Italy) Beatrice Ricci (United States) Dalayna Hewitt
August 30	Monastir, Tunisia; Hard; W15; Singles and Doubles Draws	(China) Ma Yexin (Japan) Moyuka Uchijima; 6–2, 2–6, [10–6]	(Brazil) Ingrid Gamarra Martins (Argentina) Jazmín Ortenzi	(China) Ma Yexin (Argentina) Jazmín Ortenzi	(France) Evita Ramirez (United States) Jenna DeFalco (Italy) Beatrice Ricci (United States) Dalayna Hewitt

=== September ===
Week of	Tournament	Winner	Runners-up	Semifinalists	Quarterfinalists
September 6	Montreux Ladies Open; Montreux, Switzerland; Clay; W60; Singles Draw – Doubles Draw	(Brazil) Beatriz Haddad Maia; 6–4, 6–3	(United Kingdom) Francesca Jones	(France) Chloé Paquet (Turkey) Çağla Büyükakçay	(Italy) Federica Di Sarra (Switzerland) Susan Bandecchi (Switzerland) Conny Perrin (Russia) Natalia Vikhlyantseva
September 6	Montreux Ladies Open; Montreux, Switzerland; Clay; W60; Singles Draw – Doubles Draw	(France) Estelle Cascino (Italy) Camilla Rosatello; 7–6^{(7–4)}, 6–4	(Switzerland) Conny Perrin (United Kingdom) Eden Silva	(France) Chloé Paquet (Turkey) Çağla Büyükakçay	(Italy) Federica Di Sarra (Switzerland) Susan Bandecchi (Switzerland) Conny Perrin (Russia) Natalia Vikhlyantseva
September 6	Frýdek-Místek, Czech Republic; Clay; W25; Singles and Doubles Draws	(Hungary) Panna Udvardy; 6–2, 6–1	(Georgia (country)) Sofia Shapatava	(Czech Republic) Miriam Kolodziejová (Czech Republic) Jesika Malečková	(Czech Republic) Monika Kilnarová (Australia) Jaimee Fourlis (Japan) Misaki Matsuda (Bosnia and Herzegovina) Nefisa Berberović
September 6	Frýdek-Místek, Czech Republic; Clay; W25; Singles and Doubles Draws	(Japan) Kanako Morisaki (Japan) Erika Sema; 6–3, 6–1	(Czech Republic) Miriam Kolodziejová (Czech Republic) Anna Sisková	(Czech Republic) Miriam Kolodziejová (Czech Republic) Jesika Malečková	(Czech Republic) Monika Kilnarová (Australia) Jaimee Fourlis (Japan) Misaki Matsuda (Bosnia and Herzegovina) Nefisa Berberović
September 6	Saint-Palais-sur-Mer, France; Clay; W25; Singles and Doubles Draws	(France) Amandine Hesse; 6–3, 6–4	(Kazakhstan) Anna Danilina	(France) Alice Robbe (Greece) Despina Papamichail	(Italy) Martina Colmegna (France) Loïs Boisson (France) Léolia Jeanjean (Lithuania) Justina Mikulskytė
September 6	Saint-Palais-sur-Mer, France; Clay; W25; Singles and Doubles Draws	(Kazakhstan) Anna Danilina (Ukraine) Valeriya Strakhova; 6–7^{(7–9)}, 6–2, [10–4]	(France) Audrey Albié (France) Léolia Jeanjean	(France) Alice Robbe (Greece) Despina Papamichail	(Italy) Martina Colmegna (France) Loïs Boisson (France) Léolia Jeanjean (Lithuania) Justina Mikulskytė
September 6	Leiria, Portugal; Hard; W25; Singles and Doubles Draws	(France) Jessika Ponchet; 7–6^{(7–3)}, 6–0	(Finland) Anastasia Kulikova	(Japan) Yuriko Lily Miyazaki (Japan) Kyōka Okamura	(Russia) Anna Kalinskaya (Serbia) Natalija Stevanović (Australia) Lizette Cabrera (Portugal) Francisca Jorge
September 6	Leiria, Portugal; Hard; W25; Singles and Doubles Draws	(Brazil) Carolina Alves (Russia) Anastasia Tikhonova; 6–4, 6–4	(Spain) Celia Cerviño Ruiz (Italy) Angelica Moratelli	(Japan) Yuriko Lily Miyazaki (Japan) Kyōka Okamura	(Russia) Anna Kalinskaya (Serbia) Natalija Stevanović (Australia) Lizette Cabrera (Portugal) Francisca Jorge
September 6	Varna, Bulgaria; Clay; W15; Singles and Doubles Draws	(Russia) Daria Mishina; 6–4, 6–4	(Bulgaria) Julia Terziyska	(Serbia) Jana Bojović (Bulgaria) Katerina Dimitrova	(Romania) Georgia Crăciun (Slovakia) Romana Čisovská (Romania) Elena-Teodora Cadar (Greece) Martha Matoula
September 6	Varna, Bulgaria; Clay; W15; Singles and Doubles Draws	(Romania) Georgia Crăciun (Romania) Oana Gavrilă; 4–6, 7–6^{(8–6)}, [10–2]	(Italy) Chiara Catini (Russia) Victoria Mikhaylova	(Serbia) Jana Bojović (Bulgaria) Katerina Dimitrova	(Romania) Georgia Crăciun (Slovakia) Romana Čisovská (Romania) Elena-Teodora Cadar (Greece) Martha Matoula
September 6	Ibagué, Colombia; Clay; W15; Singles and Doubles Draws	(Brazil) Thaisa Grana Pedretti; 4–6, 1–1, ret.	(Colombia) Yuliana Lizarazo	(Colombia) María Paulina Pérez (Peru) Romina Ccuno	(United States) Rushri Wijesundera (Germany) Jasmin Jebawy (United States) Amy Zhu (Colombia) Antonia Samudio
September 6	Ibagué, Colombia; Clay; W15; Singles and Doubles Draws	(Peru) Romina Ccuno (Colombia) María Camila Torres Murcia; 3–6, 6–4, [10–5]	(Slovakia) Alica Rusová (Colombia) Antonia Samudio	(Colombia) María Paulina Pérez (Peru) Romina Ccuno	(United States) Rushri Wijesundera (Germany) Jasmin Jebawy (United States) Amy Zhu (Colombia) Antonia Samudio
September 6	Cairo, Egypt; Clay; W15; Singles and Doubles Draws	(Egypt) Lamis Alhussein Abdel Aziz; 3–6, 6–2, 6–2	(Bulgaria) Julia Stamatova	(Romania) Lavinia Tănăsie (Thailand) Punnin Kovapitukted	(United States) Anastasia Nefedova (Italy) Anita Bertoloni (Russia) Anastasia Sukhotina (Italy) Diletta Cherubini
September 6	Cairo, Egypt; Clay; W15; Singles and Doubles Draws	(Georgia (country)) Mariam Dalakishvili (Ukraine) Viktoriya Petrenko; 6–1, 6–2	(Thailand) Punnin Kovapitukted (Italy) Alessandra Simone	(Romania) Lavinia Tănăsie (Thailand) Punnin Kovapitukted	(United States) Anastasia Nefedova (Italy) Anita Bertoloni (Russia) Anastasia Sukhotina (Italy) Diletta Cherubini
September 6	Monastir, Tunisia; Hard; W15; Singles and Doubles Draws	(China) Ma Yexin; 6–4, 6–4	(Belarus) Aliona Falei	(Japan) Rina Saigo (Argentina) Martina Capurro Taborda	(Brazil) Ingrid Gamarra Martins (Thailand) Anchisa Chanta (South Korea) Choi Ji-hee (Japan) Nana Kawagishi
September 6	Monastir, Tunisia; Hard; W15; Singles and Doubles Draws	(South Korea) Choi Ji-hee (South Korea) Jeong Yeong-won; 6–4, 3–6, [10–5]	(Serbia) Elena Milovanović (Bolivia) Noelia Zeballos	(Japan) Rina Saigo (Argentina) Martina Capurro Taborda	(Brazil) Ingrid Gamarra Martins (Thailand) Anchisa Chanta (South Korea) Choi Ji-hee (Japan) Nana Kawagishi
September 13	Open Internacional de Valencia; Valencia, Spain; Clay; W80; Singles Draw – Doubles Draw	(Italy) Martina Trevisan; 4–6, 6–4, 6–0	(Hungary) Dalma Gálfi	(Bulgaria) Viktoriya Tomova (Russia) Oksana Selekhmeteva	(Georgia (country)) Ekaterine Gorgodze (Romania) Irina Bara (Hungary) Panna Udvardy (Spain) Aliona Bolsova
September 13	Open Internacional de Valencia; Valencia, Spain; Clay; W80; Singles Draw – Doubles Draw	(Belgium) Ysaline Bonaventure (Georgia (country)) Ekaterine Gorgodze; 6–2, 2–6, [10–6]	(Spain) Ángela Fita Boluda (Russia) Oksana Selekhmeteva	(Bulgaria) Viktoriya Tomova (Russia) Oksana Selekhmeteva	(Georgia (country)) Ekaterine Gorgodze (Romania) Irina Bara (Hungary) Panna Udvardy (Spain) Aliona Bolsova
September 13	Portugal Ladies Open; Caldas da Rainha, Portugal; Hard; W60+H; Singles Draw – Doubles Draw	(China) Zheng Saisai; 6–4, 3–6, 6–3	(France) Harmony Tan	(Australia) Maddison Inglis (Brazil) Beatriz Haddad Maia	(Belgium) Marie Benoît (Finland) Anastasia Kulikova (Cyprus) Raluca Șerban (China) Wang Xinyu
September 13	Portugal Ladies Open; Caldas da Rainha, Portugal; Hard; W60+H; Singles Draw – Doubles Draw	(Japan) Momoko Kobori (Japan) Hiroko Kuwata; 7–6^{(7–5)}, 7–6^{(7–2)}	(United Kingdom) Alicia Barnett (United Kingdom) Olivia Nicholls	(Australia) Maddison Inglis (Brazil) Beatriz Haddad Maia	(Belgium) Marie Benoît (Finland) Anastasia Kulikova (Cyprus) Raluca Șerban (China) Wang Xinyu
September 13	Medellín, Colombia; Clay; W25; Singles and Doubles Draws	(Colombia) Emiliana Arango; 6–0, 6–0	(Brazil) Laura Pigossi	(Ecuador) Mell Reasco (Brazil) Thaisa Grana Pedretti	(Colombia) María Paulina Pérez (Slovakia) Alica Rusová (Germany) Jasmin Jebawy (Mexico) Victoria Rodríguez
September 13	Medellín, Colombia; Clay; W25; Singles and Doubles Draws	(Colombia) María Herazo González (Brazil) Laura Pigossi; 6–2, 7–5	(United States) Rasheeda McAdoo (Mexico) Victoria Rodríguez	(Ecuador) Mell Reasco (Brazil) Thaisa Grana Pedretti	(Colombia) María Paulina Pérez (Slovakia) Alica Rusová (Germany) Jasmin Jebawy (Mexico) Victoria Rodríguez
September 13	Jablonec nad Nisou, Czech Republic; Clay; W25; Singles and Doubles Draws	(Czech Republic) Jesika Malečková; 6–2, 2–6, 6–2	(Czech Republic) Aneta Kladivová	(Hungary) Réka Luca Jani (Japan) Mana Kawamura	(Romania) Andreea Roșca (Italy) Jessica Pieri (Czech Republic) Monika Kilnarová (Italy) Giulia Gatto-Monticone
September 13	Jablonec nad Nisou, Czech Republic; Clay; W25; Singles and Doubles Draws	(Italy) Lisa Pigato (Romania) Andreea Roșca; 3–6, 6–3, [10–7]	(Japan) Mana Kawamura (Japan) Funa Kozaki	(Hungary) Réka Luca Jani (Japan) Mana Kawamura	(Romania) Andreea Roșca (Italy) Jessica Pieri (Czech Republic) Monika Kilnarová (Italy) Giulia Gatto-Monticone
September 13	Johannesburg, South Africa; Hard; W25; Singles and Doubles Draws	(Netherlands) Richèl Hogenkamp; 6–3, 4–6, 6–3	(Zimbabwe) Valeria Bhunu	(Switzerland) Joanne Züger (United States) Jenna DeFalco	(South Africa) Isabella Kruger (Israel) Nicole Khirin (United Kingdom) Matilda Mutavdzic (Germany) Eva Lys
September 13	Johannesburg, South Africa; Hard; W25; Singles and Doubles Draws	(Netherlands) Eva Vedder (Netherlands) Stéphanie Visscher; 6–4, 6–4	(Russia) Amina Anshba (Russia) Vlada Koval	(Switzerland) Joanne Züger (United States) Jenna DeFalco	(South Africa) Isabella Kruger (Israel) Nicole Khirin (United Kingdom) Matilda Mutavdzic (Germany) Eva Lys
September 13	Sozopol, Bulgaria; Hard; W15; Singles and Doubles Draws	(Italy) Chiara Catini; 4–6, 7–6^{(7–5)}, 6–3	(Slovenia) Nastja Kolar	(Bulgaria) Dia Evtimova (Romania) Oana Gavrilă	(Turkey) Defne Çırpanlı (Romania) Vanessa Popa Teiușanu (Bulgaria) Denislava Glushkova (Bulgaria) Julia Terziyska
September 13	Sozopol, Bulgaria; Hard; W15; Singles and Doubles Draws	(Slovakia) Katarína Kužmová (Russia) Ekaterina Reyngold; 6–1, 6–4	(Bulgaria) Katerina Dimitrova (Romania) Vanessa Popa Teiușanu	(Bulgaria) Dia Evtimova (Romania) Oana Gavrilă	(Turkey) Defne Çırpanlı (Romania) Vanessa Popa Teiușanu (Bulgaria) Denislava Glushkova (Bulgaria) Julia Terziyska
September 13	Cairo, Egypt; Clay; W15; Singles and Doubles Draws	(Russia) Anastasia Zolotareva; 7–6^{(8–6)}, 6–2	(Italy) Gloria Ceschi	(Ukraine) Viktoriya Petrenko (Thailand) Punnin Kovapitukted	(Japan) Riko Sawayanagi (Netherlands) Lian Tran (Russia) Anna Ureke (Italy) Gaia Squarcialupi
September 13	Cairo, Egypt; Clay; W15; Singles and Doubles Draws	(Russia) Ekaterina Vishnevskaya (Russia) Anastasia Zolotareva; 7–5, 0–6, [10–3]	(Thailand) Punnin Kovapitukted (Russia) Anna Ureke	(Ukraine) Viktoriya Petrenko (Thailand) Punnin Kovapitukted	(Japan) Riko Sawayanagi (Netherlands) Lian Tran (Russia) Anna Ureke (Italy) Gaia Squarcialupi
September 13	Dijon, France; Clay; W15; Singles and Doubles Draws	(Switzerland) Alina Granwehr; 4–6, 6–2, 6–2	(Switzerland) Valentina Ryser	(Germany) Angelina Wirges (Hungary) Amarissa Kiara Tóth	(France) Audrey Albié (Switzerland) Naïma Karamoko (France) Léa Tholey (Romania) Arina Vasilescu
September 13	Dijon, France; Clay; W15; Singles and Doubles Draws	(Switzerland) Naïma Karamoko (Switzerland) Xenia Knoll; 6–2, 6–2	(Hungary) Amarissa Kiara Tóth (France) Lucie Wargnier	(Germany) Angelina Wirges (Hungary) Amarissa Kiara Tóth	(France) Audrey Albié (Switzerland) Naïma Karamoko (France) Léa Tholey (Romania) Arina Vasilescu
September 13	Melilla, Spain; Clay; W15; Singles and Doubles Draws	(Germany) Luisa Meyer auf der Heide; 6–3, 7–5	(Spain) Noelia Bouzó Zanotti	(Spain) Claudia Hoste Ferrer (Spain) Lucía Llinares Domingo	(Sweden) Caijsa Hennemann (Spain) Alba Rey García (South Korea) Ku Yeon-woo (Germany) Chantal Sauvant
September 13	Melilla, Spain; Clay; W15; Singles and Doubles Draws	(Sweden) Caijsa Hennemann (South Korea) Ku Yeon-woo; 6–3, 6–0	(Germany) Luisa Meyer auf der Heide (Germany) Chantal Sauvant	(Spain) Claudia Hoste Ferrer (Spain) Lucía Llinares Domingo	(Sweden) Caijsa Hennemann (Spain) Alba Rey García (South Korea) Ku Yeon-woo (Germany) Chantal Sauvant
September 13	Monastir, Tunisia; Hard; W15; Singles and Doubles Draws	(Thailand) Anchisa Chanta; 7–6^{(7–4)}, 6–3	(Serbia) Elena Milovanović	(United States) Dalayna Hewitt (Hong Kong) Adithya Karunaratne	(Denmark) Olga Helmi (Croatia) Mariana Dražić (India) Sravya Shivani Chilakalapudi (Argentina) Martina Capurro Taborda
September 13	Monastir, Tunisia; Hard; W15; Singles and Doubles Draws	(India) Sharmada Balu (India) Sravya Shivani Chilakalapudi; 7–5, 6–3	(United States) Dalayna Hewitt (Serbia) Elena Milovanović	(United States) Dalayna Hewitt (Hong Kong) Adithya Karunaratne	(Denmark) Olga Helmi (Croatia) Mariana Dražić (India) Sravya Shivani Chilakalapudi (Argentina) Martina Capurro Taborda
September 20	Wiesbaden Tennis Open; Wiesbaden, Germany; Clay; W80; Singles Draw – Doubles Draw	(Hungary) Anna Bondár; 6–2, 6–4	(France) Clara Burel	(North Macedonia) Lina Gjorcheska (Switzerland) Conny Perrin	(Romania) Alexandra Ignatik (Italy) Federica Di Sarra (Italy) Lucrezia Stefanini (Switzerland) Ylena In-Albon
September 20	Wiesbaden Tennis Open; Wiesbaden, Germany; Clay; W80; Singles Draw – Doubles Draw	(Hungary) Anna Bondár (Belgium) Lara Salden; 6–7^{(9–11)}, 6–2, [10–4]	(Netherlands) Arianne Hartono (Australia) Olivia Tjandramulia	(North Macedonia) Lina Gjorcheska (Switzerland) Conny Perrin	(Romania) Alexandra Ignatik (Italy) Federica Di Sarra (Italy) Lucrezia Stefanini (Switzerland) Ylena In-Albon
September 20	Open Ciudad de Valencia; Valencia, Spain; Clay; W80; Singles Draw – Doubles Draw	(Netherlands) Arantxa Rus; 6–4, 7–6^{(7–3)}	(Romania) Mihaela Buzărnescu	(Australia) Seone Mendez (Spain) Aliona Bolsova	(Chile) Daniela Seguel (Romania) Irina Bara (Venezuela) Andrea Gámiz (United Kingdom) Francesca Jones
September 20	Open Ciudad de Valencia; Valencia, Spain; Clay; W80; Singles Draw – Doubles Draw	(Spain) Aliona Bolsova (Venezuela) Andrea Gámiz; 6–3, 6–4	(Georgia (country)) Ekaterine Gorgodze (Brazil) Laura Pigossi	(Australia) Seone Mendez (Spain) Aliona Bolsova	(Chile) Daniela Seguel (Romania) Irina Bara (Venezuela) Andrea Gámiz (United Kingdom) Francesca Jones
September 20	Santarém, Portugal; Hard; W25; Singles and Doubles Draws	(Cyprus) Raluca Șerban; 6–3, 6–4	(Ukraine) Daria Snigur	(Australia) Ellen Perez (Bulgaria) Isabella Shinikova	(Slovakia) Viktória Kužmová (United States) Robin Anderson (Turkey) Pemra Özgen (Russia) Anastasia Tikhonova
September 20	Santarém, Portugal; Hard; W25; Singles and Doubles Draws	(Belgium) Marie Benoît (United Kingdom) Eden Silva; 7–5, 6–1	(United Kingdom) Alicia Barnett (United Kingdom) Olivia Nicholls	(Australia) Ellen Perez (Bulgaria) Isabella Shinikova	(Slovakia) Viktória Kužmová (United States) Robin Anderson (Turkey) Pemra Özgen (Russia) Anastasia Tikhonova
September 20	Johannesburg, South Africa; Hard; W25; Singles and Doubles Draws	(Russia) Alina Charaeva; 2–0, ret.	(Netherlands) Richèl Hogenkamp	(Netherlands) Eva Vedder (France) Tessah Andrianjafitrimo	(Zimbabwe) Valeria Bhunu (Switzerland) Joanne Züger (Sweden) Jacqueline Cabaj Awad (United Kingdom) Matilda Mutavdzic
September 20	Johannesburg, South Africa; Hard; W25; Singles and Doubles Draws	(Switzerland) Jenny Dürst (Switzerland) Nina Stadler; 6–7^{(5–7)}, 7–5, [11–9]	(Netherlands) Eva Vedder (Netherlands) Stéphanie Visscher	(Netherlands) Eva Vedder (France) Tessah Andrianjafitrimo	(Zimbabwe) Valeria Bhunu (Switzerland) Joanne Züger (Sweden) Jacqueline Cabaj Awad (United Kingdom) Matilda Mutavdzic
September 20	Fort Worth, United States; Hard; W25; Singles and Doubles Draws	(Estonia) Kaia Kanepi; 6–2, 6–1	(United States) Kayla Day	(Australia) Alexandra Bozovic (Argentina) María Lourdes Carlé	(United States) Emma Navarro (United States) Alexa Graham (Colombia) Emiliana Arango (United States) Sachia Vickery
September 20	Fort Worth, United States; Hard; W25; Singles and Doubles Draws	(United States) Sophie Chang (United States) Amy Zhu; 4–6, 6–3, [10–8]	(United States) Rasheeda McAdoo (Australia) Ivana Popovic	(Australia) Alexandra Bozovic (Argentina) María Lourdes Carlé	(United States) Emma Navarro (United States) Alexa Graham (Colombia) Emiliana Arango (United States) Sachia Vickery
September 20	Cairo, Egypt; Clay; W15; Singles and Doubles Draws	(Russia) Anastasia Zolotareva; 6–2, 6–1	(Russia) Valeriya Yushchenko	(Italy) Giulia Crescenzi (Argentina) Martina Capurro Taborda	(Italy) Diletta Cherubini (Italy) Arianna Zucchini (Italy) Deborah Chiesa (Egypt) Lamis Alhussein Abdel Aziz
September 20	Cairo, Egypt; Clay; W15; Singles and Doubles Draws	(Netherlands) Jasmijn Gimbrère (Netherlands) Demi Tran; 3–6, 6–4, [13–11]	(Japan) Minami Akiyama (Japan) Lisa-Marie Rioux	(Italy) Giulia Crescenzi (Argentina) Martina Capurro Taborda	(Italy) Diletta Cherubini (Italy) Arianna Zucchini (Italy) Deborah Chiesa (Egypt) Lamis Alhussein Abdel Aziz
September 20	Cancún, Mexico; Hard; W15; Singles and Doubles Draws	(United States) Anna Rogers; 6–0, 7–6^{(7–2)}	(United States) Christina Rosca	(Slovakia) Alica Rusová (Mexico) María José Portillo Ramírez	(Chile) Fernanda Brito (United States) Sofia Sewing (United States) Stephanie Kent (Mexico) Victoria Rodríguez
September 20	Cancún, Mexico; Hard; W15; Singles and Doubles Draws	(Mexico) María José Portillo Ramírez (Mexico) Victoria Rodríguez; 6–1, 6–1	(Switzerland) Chelsea Fontenel (United States) Qavia Lopez	(Slovakia) Alica Rusová (Mexico) María José Portillo Ramírez	(Chile) Fernanda Brito (United States) Sofia Sewing (United States) Stephanie Kent (Mexico) Victoria Rodríguez
September 20	Monastir, Tunisia; Hard; W15; Singles and Doubles Draws	(Denmark) Olga Helmi; 6–1, 6–3	(Belgium) Clara Vlasselaer	(Serbia) Elena Milovanović (Tunisia) Chiraz Bechri	(Thailand) Pimrada Jattavapornvanit (Turkey) Ayla Aksu (India) Zeel Desai (Germany) Mia Mack
September 20	Monastir, Tunisia; Hard; W15; Singles and Doubles Draws	(China) Ma Yexin (Russia) Ekaterina Reyngold; 6–2, 6–2	(France) Yasmine Mansouri (Japan) Himari Sato	(Serbia) Elena Milovanović (Tunisia) Chiraz Bechri	(Thailand) Pimrada Jattavapornvanit (Turkey) Ayla Aksu (India) Zeel Desai (Germany) Mia Mack
September 27	ITF Féminin Le Neubourg; Le Neubourg, France; Hard; W80+H; Singles Draw – Doubles Draw	(Romania) Mihaela Buzărnescu; 6–1, 6–3	(Hungary) Anna Bondár	(Netherlands) Arianne Hartono (Russia) Oksana Selekhmeteva	(Italy) Cristiana Ferrando (France) Amandine Hesse (Australia) Olivia Gadecki (United States) Robin Anderson
September 27	ITF Féminin Le Neubourg; Le Neubourg, France; Hard; W80+H; Singles Draw – Doubles Draw	(United States) Robin Anderson (France) Amandine Hesse; 6–3, 7–6^{(7–2)}	(France) Estelle Cascino (United Kingdom) Sarah Beth Grey	(Netherlands) Arianne Hartono (Russia) Oksana Selekhmeteva	(Italy) Cristiana Ferrando (France) Amandine Hesse (Australia) Olivia Gadecki (United States) Robin Anderson
September 27	Berkeley Tennis Club Challenge; Berkeley, United States; Hard; W60; Singles Draw – Doubles Draw	(United States) Usue Maitane Arconada; 6–1, 6–3	(Mexico) Marcela Zacarías	(Japan) Kurumi Nara (Japan) Mayo Hibi	(United States) Emma Navarro (United States) Sophie Chang (United States) Louisa Chirico (Chinese Taipei) Liang En-shuo
September 27	Berkeley Tennis Club Challenge; Berkeley, United States; Hard; W60; Singles Draw – Doubles Draw	(United States) Sophie Chang (United States) Angela Kulikov; 6–4, 6–3	(Chinese Taipei) Liang En-shuo (China) Lu Jiajing	(Japan) Kurumi Nara (Japan) Mayo Hibi	(United States) Emma Navarro (United States) Sophie Chang (United States) Louisa Chirico (Chinese Taipei) Liang En-shuo
September 27	Budapest, Hungary; Clay; W25; Singles and Doubles Draws	(Hungary) Réka Luca Jani; 6–1, 6–4	(Italy) Giulia Gatto-Monticone	(Hungary) Natália Szabanin (Croatia) Tena Lukas	(Sweden) Caijsa Hennemann (North Macedonia) Lina Gjorcheska (Italy) Bianca Turati (Romania) Alexandra Ignatik
September 27	Budapest, Hungary; Clay; W25; Singles and Doubles Draws	(Hungary) Dorka Drahota-Szabó (Sweden) Caijsa Hennemann; Walkover	(Hungary) Adrienn Nagy (Hungary) Natália Szabanin	(Hungary) Natália Szabanin (Croatia) Tena Lukas	(Sweden) Caijsa Hennemann (North Macedonia) Lina Gjorcheska (Italy) Bianca Turati (Romania) Alexandra Ignatik
September 27	Lisboa Belém Open; Lisbon, Portugal; Clay; W25; Singles and Doubles Draws	(Spain) Irene Burillo Escorihuela; 6–4, 6–0	(Turkey) İpek Öz	(Romania) Andreea Prisăcariu (Spain) Andrea Lázaro García	(Turkey) Berfu Cengiz (Australia) Ellen Perez (Switzerland) Simona Waltert (France) Diane Parry
September 27	Lisboa Belém Open; Lisbon, Portugal; Clay; W25; Singles and Doubles Draws	(Spain) Yvonne Cavallé Reimers (Spain) Ángela Fita Boluda; 3–6, 6–3, [10–4]	(Argentina) Paula Ormaechea (Serbia) Natalija Stevanović	(Romania) Andreea Prisăcariu (Spain) Andrea Lázaro García	(Turkey) Berfu Cengiz (Australia) Ellen Perez (Switzerland) Simona Waltert (France) Diane Parry
September 27	Pretoria, South Africa; Hard; W25; Singles and Doubles Draws	(South Africa) Zoë Kruger; 3–6, 6–4, 6–4	(Netherlands) Suzan Lamens	(Russia) Amina Anshba (Russia) Maria Bondarenko	(France) Tessah Andrianjafitrimo (Sweden) Jacqueline Cabaj Awad (Israel) Lina Glushko (Switzerland) Jenny Dürst
September 27	Pretoria, South Africa; Hard; W25; Singles and Doubles Draws	(Russia) Amina Anshba (United States) Elizabeth Mandlik; 6–2, 6–2	(Switzerland) Jenny Dürst (Switzerland) Nina Stadler	(Russia) Amina Anshba (Russia) Maria Bondarenko	(France) Tessah Andrianjafitrimo (Sweden) Jacqueline Cabaj Awad (Israel) Lina Glushko (Switzerland) Jenny Dürst
September 27	Cairo, Egypt; Clay; W15; Singles and Doubles Draws	(Russia) Anastasia Zolotareva; 6–2, 3–6, 6–3	(Egypt) Lamis Alhussein Abdel Aziz	(Argentina) Martina Capurro Taborda (Italy) Deborah Chiesa	(Russia) Valeriya Yushchenko (Canada) Carson Branstine (Italy) Irene Lavino (Romania) Arina Vasilescu
September 27	Cairo, Egypt; Clay; W15; Singles and Doubles Draws	(Netherlands) Jasmijn Gimbrère (Netherlands) Lian Tran; 6–3, 3–6, [10–5]	(Thailand) Punnin Kovapitukted (Netherlands) Demi Tran	(Argentina) Martina Capurro Taborda (Italy) Deborah Chiesa	(Russia) Valeriya Yushchenko (Canada) Carson Branstine (Italy) Irene Lavino (Romania) Arina Vasilescu
September 27	Cancún, Mexico; Hard; W15; Singles and Doubles Draws	(Latvia) Darja Semenistaja; 6–3, 7–5	(Mexico) María José Portillo Ramírez	(Belarus) Jana Kolodynska (United States) Christina Rosca	(United States) Sofia Sewing (Chile) Fernanda Brito (United States) Taylor Ng (Switzerland) Chelsea Fontenel
September 27	Cancún, Mexico; Hard; W15; Singles and Doubles Draws	(United States) Anna Rogers (United States) Christina Rosca; 6–2, 6–2	(United States) Dasha Ivanova (United States) Lauren Proctor	(Belarus) Jana Kolodynska (United States) Christina Rosca	(United States) Sofia Sewing (Chile) Fernanda Brito (United States) Taylor Ng (Switzerland) Chelsea Fontenel
September 27	Monastir, Tunisia; Hard; W15; Singles and Doubles Draws	(Turkey) Ayla Aksu; 6–3, 6–4	(Thailand) Pimrada Jattavapornvanit	(Slovakia) Eszter Méri (Spain) Noelia Bouzó Zanotti	(India) Jennifer Luikham (Russia) Ekaterina Reyngold (Switzerland) Sebastianna Scilipoti (Germany) Mia Mack
September 27	Monastir, Tunisia; Hard; W15; Singles and Doubles Draws	(France) Yasmine Mansouri (Russia) Ekaterina Reyngold; 6–1, 6–3	(Japan) Honoka Kobayashi (China) Ma Yexin	(Slovakia) Eszter Méri (Spain) Noelia Bouzó Zanotti	(India) Jennifer Luikham (Russia) Ekaterina Reyngold (Switzerland) Sebastianna Scilipoti (Germany) Mia Mack
September 27	Lubbock, United States; Hard; W15; Singles and Doubles Draws	(United States) Adriana Reami; 7–6^{(8–6)}, 6–1	(United States) McCartney Kessler	(Thailand) Mananchaya Sawangkaew (Russia) Anzhelika Isaeva	(United States) Liv Hovde (Canada) Layne Sleeth (Ukraine) Anita Sahdiieva (France) Giulia Morlet
September 27	Lubbock, United States; Hard; W15; Singles and Doubles Draws	(France) Tiphanie Fiquet (Chile) Fernanda Labraña; 6–4, 6–7^{(2–7)}, [10–8]	(United States) Carmen Corley (United States) Ivana Corley	(Thailand) Mananchaya Sawangkaew (Russia) Anzhelika Isaeva	(United States) Liv Hovde (Canada) Layne Sleeth (Ukraine) Anita Sahdiieva (France) Giulia Morlet
