= 2021 Open Araba en Femenino =

Tennis tournament

- Date: 12–18 July 2021
- Edition: 2nd
- Category: ITF Women's World Tennis Tour
- Prize money: $60,000
- Surface: Hard
- Location: Vitoria-Gasteiz, Spain

Champions

Singles
- (Spain) Rebeka Masarova

Doubles
- (Australia) Olivia Gadecki / (Spain) Rebeka Masarova
- Open Araba en Femenino

The 2021 Open Araba en Femenino was a professional women's tennis tournament played on outdoor hard courts. It was the second edition of the tournament which was part of the 2021 ITF Women's World Tennis Tour. It took place in Vitoria-Gasteiz, Spain between 12 and 18 July 2021.

== Singles main-draw entrants ==
=== Seeds ===
Country	Player	Rank^{1}	Seed
NED	Lesley Pattinama Kerkhove	174	1
PAR	Verónica Cepede Royg	202	2
NED	Indy de Vroome	207	3
FRA	Jessika Ponchet	233	4
TUR	Pemra Özgen	244	5
KOR	Han Na-lae	256	6
JPN	Mai Hontama	280	7
~~GBR~~	~~Katie Swan~~	~~292~~	~~8~~

- ^{1} Rankings are as of 28 June 2021.

=== Other entrants ===
The following players received wildcards into the singles main draw:

- (Spain) Mercedes Aristegui
- (Spain) Lucía Cortez Llorca
- (Spain) Ángela Fita Boluda
- (Spain) Ane Mintegi del Olmo

The following players received entry using protected rankings:

- (Japan) Haruna Arakawa
- (Japan) Akiko Omae
- ~~(United Kingdom) Katie Swan~~

The following player received entry using a junior exempt:

- (Andorra) Victoria Jiménez Kasintseva

The following players received entry from the qualifying draw:

- (Spain) Alba Carrillo Marín
- (Spain) Celia Cerviño Ruiz
- (Spain) María García Cid
- (Switzerland) Bojana Klincov
- (Italy) Verena Meliss
- (Slovakia) Sofia Milatová
- (Spain) Estela Pérez Somarriba
- (Czech Republic) Laetitia Pulchartová

The following players received entry as lucky losers:

- (Denmark) Olivia Gram
- (Germany) Mina Hodzic

== Champions ==
=== Singles ===
- (Spain) Rebeka Masarova def. (Spain) Ane Mintegi del Olmo, 7–6^{(7–3)}, 6–4

=== Doubles ===
- (Australia) Olivia Gadecki / (Spain) Rebeka Masarova def. (Spain) Celia Cerviño Ruiz / (United Kingdom) Olivia Nicholls, 6–3, 6–3
