= 2021 BBVA Open Internacional de Valencia – Singles =

Singles
- 2021 BBVA Open Internacional de Valencia

Final
- Champion: (Italy) Martina Trevisan
- Runner-up: (Hungary) Dalma Gálfi
- Score: 4–6, 6–4, 6–0

Events
Singles	Doubles
- Open Internacional de Valencia

This was the first edition of the tournament.

Martina Trevisan won the title, defeating Dalma Gálfi in the final, 4–6, 6–4, 6–0.

== Seeds ==
1. (Netherlands) Arantxa Rus (second round)
2. (Italy) Martina Trevisan (champion)
3. (Belgium) Maryna Zanevska (withdrew)
4. (Bulgaria) Viktoriya Tomova (semifinals)
5. (Romania) Irina Bara (quarterfinals)
6. (Belgium) Ysaline Bonaventure (first round)
7. (Hungary) Dalma Gálfi (final)
8. (Spain) Aliona Bolsova (quarterfinals)

== Draw ==
Key

- Q = Qualifier
- WC = Wild card
- LL = Lucky loser
- Alt = Alternate
- ITF = ITF entry
- PR = Protected ranking
- SR = Special ranking
- SE = Special exempt
- JE = Junior exempt
- JR = Junior Accelerator Programme entrant
- CO = College Accelerator Programme entrant
- NG = Next Gen Accelerator Program entrant
- w/o = Walkover
- r = Retired
- d = Defaulted

=== Finals ===
Semifinals
7	(Hungary) Dalma Gálfi	6	7^{7}
4	(Bulgaria) Viktoriya Tomova	2	6^{3}
Q	(Russia) Oksana Selekhmeteva	2	6	2
2	(Italy) Martina Trevisan	6	2	6

Final
7	(Hungary) Dalma Gálfi	6	4	0
2	(Italy) Martina Trevisan	4	6	6

=== Top half ===
First round
1	(Netherlands) A Rus	6	6
(Chile) D Seguel	1	2
Q	(Croatia) T Lukas	4	4
(Georgia (country)) E Gorgodze	6	6
(France) C Paquet	3	6	7
Q	(Romania) C Dinu	6	4	5
Q	(Spain) Á Fita Boluda	4	4
7	(Hungary) D Gálfi	6	6
4	(Bulgaria) V Tomova	6	7^{7}
Q	(Spain) G Maristany	4	6^{4}
WC	(Spain) A Mintegi del Olmo	6	6
Q	(Romania) IG Ghioroaie	3	4
Q	(Venezuela) A Gámiz	2	6	6
Q	(Romania) A Prisăcariu	6	3	4
WC	(Spain) L Romero Gormaz	6	6^{3}	2
5	(Romania) I Bara	2	7^{7}	6

Second round
1	(Netherlands) A Rus	6^{7}	6	4
(Georgia (country)) E Gorgodze	7^{9}	1	6
(France) C Paquet	4	4
7	(Hungary) D Gálfi	6	6
4	(Bulgaria) V Tomova	6	3	6
WC	(Spain) A Mintegi del Olmo	2	6	4
Q	(Venezuela) A Gámiz	4	5
5	(Romania) I Bara	6	7

Quarterfinals
(Georgia (country)) E Gorgodze	1	2
7	(Hungary) D Gálfi	6	6
4	(Bulgaria) V Tomova	6	4	7
5	(Romania) I Bara	2	6	5

Semifinals
7	(Hungary) D Gálfi	6	7^{7}
4	(Bulgaria) V Tomova	2	6^{3}

=== Bottom half ===
First round
6	(Belgium) Y Bonaventure	4	2
(Greece) D Papamichail	6	6
WC	(Spain) M Bassols Ribera	3	2
(Hungary) P Udvardy	6	6
LL	(Belarus) I Shymanovich	1	4
Q	(Russia) O Selekhmeteva	6	6
(United Kingdom) F Jones	6	6^{5}	6
LL	(Spain) Y Cavallé Reimers	3	7^{7}	3
8	(Spain) A Bolsova	6	6
(France) D Parry	4	4
(Spain) R Masarova	6	6
WC	(Andorra) V Jiménez Kasintseva	3	2
(Australia) S Mendez	7^{8}	6
(Turkey) Ç Büyükakçay	6^{6}	2
(Paraguay) V Cepede Royg	3	5
2	(Italy) M Trevisan	6	7

Second round
(Greece) D Papamichail	7^{7}	1	4
(Hungary) P Udvardy	6^{4}	6	6
Q	(Russia) O Selekhmeteva	6^{3}	6	5
(United Kingdom) F Jones	7^{7}	3	0^{r}
8	(Spain) A Bolsova	6	6
(Spain) R Masarova	4	3
(Australia) S Mendez	0	3
2	(Italy) M Trevisan	6	6

Quarterfinals
(Hungary) P Udvardy	0	2
Q	(Russia) O Selekhmeteva	6	6
8	(Spain) A Bolsova	6	4	3
2	(Italy) M Trevisan	4	6	6

Semifinals
Q	(Russia) O Selekhmeteva	2	6	2
2	(Italy) M Trevisan	6	2	6
