= 2021 Open Araba en Femenino – Singles =

Draw of a $60K ITF tournament; all other tournaments from the same category have page

Singles
- 2021 Open Araba en Femenino

Final
- Champion: (Spain) Rebeka Masarova
- Runner-up: (Spain) Ane Mintegi del Olmo
- Score: 7–6^{(7–3)}, 6–4

Events
Singles	Doubles
← 2019 ·	Open Araba en Femenino	· 2022 →

Cristina Bucșa was the defending champion but chose to participate in Budapest instead.

Rebeka Masarova won the title, defeating Ane Mintegi del Olmo in the final, 7–6^{(7–3)}, 6–4.

== Seeds ==
1. (Netherlands) Lesley Pattinama Kerkhove (quarterfinals)
2. (Paraguay) Verónica Cepede Royg (quarterfinals)
3. (Netherlands) Indy de Vroome (first round)
4. (France) Jessika Ponchet (quarterfinals)
5. (Turkey) Pemra Özgen (first round)
6. (South Korea) Han Na-lae (first round)
7. (Japan) Mai Hontama (semifinals)
8. (United Kingdom) Katie Swan (withdrew)

== Draw ==
=== Key ===
- Q = Qualifier
- WC = Wild card
- LL = Lucky loser
- Alt = Alternate
- SE = Special exempt
- PR = Protected ranking
- ITF = ITF entry
- JE = Junior exempt
- w/o = Walkover
- r = Retired
- d = Defaulted
- SR = Special ranking

=== Finals ===
Semifinals
WC	(Spain) Ane Mintegi del Olmo	6	4	6
Q	(Spain) Estela Pérez Somarriba	0	6	4
7	(Japan) Mai Hontama	4	1
(Spain) Rebeka Masarova	6	6

Final
WC	(Spain) Ane Mintegi del Olmo	6^{3}	4
(Spain) Rebeka Masarova	7^{7}	6

=== Top half ===
First round
1	(Netherlands) L Pattinama Kerkhove	6	6
WC	(Spain) M Aristegui	3	0
Q	(Switzerland) B Klincov	3	6	2
LL	(Denmark) O Gram	6	2	6
(Japan) J Namigata	5	6	4
Q	(Slovakia) S Milatová	7	0	6
WC	(Spain) A Mintegi del Olmo	3	6	6
5	(Turkey) P Özgen	6	3	3
3	(Netherlands) I de Vroome	1	5
Q	(Spain) E Pérez Somarriba	6	7
(Spain) M Gutiérrez Carrasco	1	6	6
PR	(Japan) H Arakawa	6	2	2
(Spain) M Bassols Ribera	3	4
(Finland) A Kulikova	6	6
(France) M Noël	6	7
LL	(Germany) M Hodzic	4	5

Second round
1	(Netherlands) L Pattinama Kerkhove	6	6
LL	(Denmark) O Gram	2	2
Q	(Slovakia) S Milatová	3	6	2
WC	(Spain) A Mintegi del Olmo	6	1	6
Q	(Spain) E Pérez Somarriba	6	6
(Spain) M Gutiérrez Carrasco	4	3
(Finland) A Kulikova	6	6
(France) M Noël	0	3

Quarterfinals
1	(Netherlands) L Pattinama Kerkhove	3	3
WC	(Spain) A Mintegi del Olmo	6	6
Q	(Spain) E Pérez Somarriba	6	7
(Finland) A Kulikova	3	5

Semifinals
WC	(Spain) A Mintegi del Olmo	6	4	6
Q	(Spain) E Pérez Somarriba	0	6	4

=== Bottom half ===
First round
7	(Japan) M Hontama	6	6
(Japan) H Kaji	2	0
Q	(Spain) C Cerviño Ruiz	4	1
Q	(Spain) A Carrillo Marín	6	6
PR	(Japan) A Omae	3	4
Q	(Czech Republic) L Pulchartová	6	6
Q	(Italy) V Meliss	3	6	6^{4}
4	(France) J Ponchet	6	2	7^{7}
6	(South Korea) N-l Han	7	4	2
(Spain) R Masarova	5	6	6
WC	(Spain) L Cortez Llorca	7^{7}	3	2
WC	(Spain) Á Fita Boluda	6^{5}	6	6
Q	(Spain) M García Cid	1	3
JE	(Andorra) V Jiménez Kasintseva	6	6
(Australia) O Gadecki	6^{5}	5
2	(Paraguay) V Cepede Royg	7^{7}	7

Second round
7	(Japan) M Hontama	6	6
Q	(Spain) A Carrillo Marín	4	3
Q	(Czech Republic) L Pulchartová	6^{5}	4
4	(France) J Ponchet	7^{7}	6
(Spain) R Masarova	2	7	6
WC	(Spain) Á Fita Boluda	6	5	0
JE	(Andorra) V Jiménez Kasintseva	3	6^{8}
2	(Paraguay) V Cepede Royg	6	7^{10}

Quarterfinals
7	(Japan) M Hontama	6	6
4	(France) J Ponchet	4	3
(Spain) R Masarova	7^{7}	6
2	(Paraguay) V Cepede Royg	6^{5}	4

Semifinals
7	(Japan) M Hontama	4	1
(Spain) R Masarova	6	6
