= 2021 BBVA Open Internacional de Valencia =

Tennis tournament

- Date: 13–19 September 2021
- Edition: 1st
- Category: ITF Women's World Tennis Tour
- Prize money: $80,000
- Surface: Clay
- Location: Valencia, Spain

Champions

Singles
- (Italy) Martina Trevisan

Doubles
- (Belgium) Ysaline Bonaventure / (Georgia (country)) Ekaterine Gorgodze
- Open Internacional de Valencia

The 2021 BBVA Open Internacional de Valencia was a professional women's tennis tournament played on outdoor clay courts. It was the first edition of the tournament which was part of the 2021 ITF Women's World Tennis Tour. It took place in Valencia, Spain between 13 and 19 September 2021.

== Singles main-draw entrants ==
=== Seeds ===
Country	Player	Rank^{1}	Seed
NED	Arantxa Rus	71	1
ITA	Martina Trevisan	106	2
~~BEL~~	~~Maryna Zanevska~~	~~113~~	~~3~~
BUL	Viktoriya Tomova	117	4
ROU	Irina Bara	118	5
BEL	Ysaline Bonaventure	129	6
HUN	Dalma Gálfi	152	7
ESP	Aliona Bolsova	156	8

- ^{1} Rankings are as of 30 August 2021.

=== Other entrants ===
The following players received wildcards into the singles main draw:

- (Spain) Marina Bassols Ribera
- (Andorra) Victoria Jiménez Kasintseva
- (Spain) Ane Mintegi del Olmo
- (Spain) Leyre Romero Gormaz

The following players received entry from the qualifying draw:

- (Romania) Cristina Dinu
- (Spain) Ángela Fita Boluda
- (Venezuela) Andrea Gámiz
- (Romania) Ilona Georgiana Ghioroaie
- (Croatia) Tena Lukas
- (Spain) Guiomar Maristany
- (Romania) Andreea Prisăcariu
- (Russia) Oksana Selekhmeteva

The following players received entry as lucky losers:

- (Spain) Yvonne Cavallé Reimers
- (Belarus) Iryna Shymanovich

== Champions ==
=== Singles ===
- (Italy) Martina Trevisan def. (Hungary) Dalma Gálfi, 4–6, 6–4, 6–0

=== Doubles ===
- (Belgium) Ysaline Bonaventure / (Georgia (country)) Ekaterine Gorgodze def. (Spain) Ángela Fita Boluda / (Russia) Oksana Selekhmeteva, 6–2, 2–6, [10–6]
