= 2021 Open Araba en Femenino – Doubles =

Doubles
- 2021 Open Araba en Femenino

Final
- Champions: (Australia) Olivia Gadecki (Spain) Rebeka Masarova
- Runners-up: (Spain) Celia Cerviño Ruiz (United Kingdom) Olivia Nicholls
- Score: 6–3, 6–3

Events
Singles	Doubles
← 2019 ·	Open Araba en Femenino	· 2022 →

Victoria Rodríguez and Ana Sofía Sánchez were the defending champions but chose not to participate.

Olivia Gadecki and Rebeka Masarova won the title, defeating Celia Cerviño Ruiz and Olivia Nicholls in the final, 6–3, 6–3.

== Seeds ==
1. (South Korea) Han Na-lae / (Japan) Akiko Omae (semifinals)
2. (Japan) Haruna Arakawa / (Japan) Mana Ayukawa (quarterfinals)
3. (Australia) Olivia Gadecki / (Spain) Rebeka Masarova (champions)
4. (Spain) Celia Cerviño Ruiz / (United Kingdom) Olivia Nicholls (final)

== Draw ==
=== Key ===
- Q = Qualifier
- WC = Wild card
- LL = Lucky loser
- Alt = Alternate
- SE = Special exempt
- PR = Protected ranking
- ITF = ITF entry
- JE = Junior exempt
- w/o = Walkover
- r = Retired
- d = Defaulted
- SR = Special ranking

=== Draw ===
First round
(Spain) M Aristegui (Spain) I Pascual Montalvo	7	6
(Spain) V Koussenkova (Romania) DM Mihail	5	4
4	(Spain) C Cerviño Ruiz (United Kingdom) O Nicholls	6	6
(Spain) M Bassols Ribera (Spain) M Gutiérrez Carrasco	3	3
WC	(Andorra) V Jiménez Kasintseva (Spain) A Mintegi del Olmo	6	1	[10]
(Czech Republic) L Pulchartová (Russia) A Zakharova	4	6	[5]
(Spain) M García Cid (India) V Shinde	6	7^{7}
(Italy) V Meliss (France) M Noël	2	6^{3}
(Spain) A Carrillo Marín (Spain) Á Fita Boluda	6	6
(Spain) AM Fernández del Moral Perier (United States) E Oosterhout	2	4

Quarterfinals
1	(South Korea) N-l Han (Japan) A Omae	7	6
(Spain) M Aristegui (Spain) I Pascual Montalvo	5	2
4	(Spain) C Cerviño Ruiz (United Kingdom) O Nicholls	w/o
WC	(Andorra) V Jiménez Kasintseva (Spain) A Mintegi del Olmo
(Spain) M García Cid (India) V Shinde	2	1
3	(Australia) O Gadecki (Spain) R Masarova	6	6
(Spain) A Carrillo Marín (Spain) Á Fita Boluda	6	6
2	(Japan) H Arakawa (Japan) M Ayukawa	4	4

Semifinals
1	(South Korea) N-l Han (Japan) A Omae	6	4	[14]
4	(Spain) C Cerviño Ruiz (United Kingdom) O Nicholls	3	6	[16]
3	(Australia) O Gadecki (Spain) R Masarova	6	6
(Spain) A Carrillo Marín (Spain) Á Fita Boluda	3	4

Final
4	(Spain) C Cerviño Ruiz (United Kingdom) O Nicholls	3	3
3	(Australia) O Gadecki (Spain) R Masarova	6	6
