= 2021 BBVA Open Internacional de Valencia – Doubles =

Doubles
- 2021 BBVA Open Internacional de Valencia

Final
- Champions: (Belgium) Ysaline Bonaventure (Georgia (country)) Ekaterine Gorgodze
- Runners-up: (Spain) Ángela Fita Boluda (Russia) Oksana Selekhmeteva
- Score: 6–2, 2–6, [10–6]

Events
Singles	Doubles
- Open Internacional de Valencia

This was the first edition of the tournament.

Ysaline Bonaventure and Ekaterine Gorgodze won the title, defeating Ángela Fita Boluda and Oksana Selekhmeteva in the final, 6–2, 2–6, [10–6].

== Seeds ==
1. (Spain) Aliona Bolsova / (Venezuela) Andrea Gámiz (first round)
2. (Romania) Cristina Dinu / (Australia) Jaimee Fourlis (quarterfinals, withdrew)
3. (Romania) Irina Bara / (Romania) Andreea Prisăcariu (semifinals)
4. (United Kingdom) Sarah Beth Grey / (Australia) Seone Mendez (semifinals)

== Draw ==
Key

- Q = Qualifier
- WC = Wild card
- LL = Lucky loser
- Alt = Alternate
- ITF = ITF entry
- PR = Protected ranking
- SR = Special ranking
- SE = Special exempt
- JE = Junior exempt
- JR = Junior Accelerator Programme entrant
- CO = College Accelerator Programme entrant
- NG = Next Gen Accelerator Program entrant
- w/o = Walkover
- r = Retired
- d = Defaulted

=== Draw ===
First round
1	(Spain) A Bolsova (Venezuela) A Gámiz	2	3
(Spain) Á Fita Boluda (Russia) O Selekhmeteva	6	6
WC	(Spain) A Carrillo Marín (Spain) R González Vilar	4	7^{7}	[5]
(Latvia) K Bartone (Belarus) I Shymanovich	6	6^{4}	[10]
4	(United Kingdom) SB Grey (Australia) S Mendez	6	6
(Spain) E Guerrero Álvarez (Spain) G Maristany	2	2
(Spain) Y Cavallé Reimers (Chile) D Seguel	6	7^{8}
(Spain) I Burillo Escorihuela (Greece) D Papamichail	4	6^{6}
WC	(Spain) M Bassols Ribera (Spain) A Mintegi del Olmo	7	6
(Andorra) V Jiménez Kasintseva (Netherlands) A Rus	5	3
(Romania) N Dascălu (India) P Thombare	1	3
3	(Romania) I Bara (Romania) A Prisăcariu	6	6
(Belgium) Y Bonaventure (Georgia (country)) E Gorgodze	6	6
WC	(Spain) J Bouzas Maneiro (Spain) L Romero Gormaz	2	0
(France) C Paquet (France) D Parry	4	4
2	(Romania) C Dinu (Australia) J Fourlis	6	6

Quarterfinals
(Spain) Á Fita Boluda (Russia) O Selekhmeteva	6	6
(Latvia) K Bartone (Belarus) I Shymanovich	4	3
4	(United Kingdom) SB Grey (Australia) S Mendez	6	4	[13]
(Spain) Y Cavallé Reimers (Chile) D Seguel	4	6	[11]
WC	(Spain) M Bassols Ribera (Spain) A Mintegi del Olmo
3	(Romania) I Bara (Romania) A Prisăcariu	w/o
(Belgium) Y Bonaventure (Georgia (country)) E Gorgodze	w/o
2	(Romania) C Dinu (Australia) J Fourlis

Semifinals
(Spain) Á Fita Boluda (Russia) O Selekhmeteva	5	6	[10]
4	(United Kingdom) SB Grey (Australia) S Mendez	7	4	[4]
3	(Romania) I Bara (Romania) A Prisăcariu	6	1	[4]
(Belgium) Y Bonaventure (Georgia (country)) E Gorgodze	3	6	[10]

Final
(Spain) Á Fita Boluda (Russia) O Selekhmeteva	2	6	[6]
(Belgium) Y Bonaventure (Georgia (country)) E Gorgodze	6	2	[10]
