= Open Araba en Femenino =

- 2026 Open Araba en Femenino

ITF Women's Tour
- Event name: Open Araba en Femenino
- Location: Vitoria-Gasteiz, Spain
- Venue: Peña Vitoriana Tenis Club
- Category: ITF Women's World Tennis Tour
- Surface: Hard / Outdoor
- Draw: 32S/32Q/16D
- Prize money: $100,000
- Website: www.itfaraba.com

The Open Araba en Femenino is a tournament for professional female tennis players. The event on outdoor hardcourts is classified as a $100,000 (since 2023) ITF Women's World Tennis Tour tournament (formerly was $60,000) and has been held in Vitoria-Gasteiz, Spain, since 2019.

== Past finals ==
=== Singles ===
Year	Champion	Runner-up	Score
2026	(Poland) Martyna Kubka	(Lithuania) Justina Mikulskytė	5–7, 6–3, 6–3
2025	(Poland) Linda Klimovičová	(Lithuania) Justina Mikulskytė	0–6, 7–6^{(7–5)}, 6–0
2024	(Philippines) Alex Eala	(Andorra) Victoria Jiménez Kasintseva	6–4, 6–4
2023	(Ukraine) Daria Snigur	(France) Jessika Ponchet	3–6, 6–4, 6–1
2022	(France) Jessika Ponchet	(Switzerland) Jenny Dürst	6–4, 7–5
2021	(Spain) Rebeka Masarova	(Spain) Ane Mintegi del Olmo	7–6^{(7–3)}, 6–4
2020	Tournament cancelled due to the COVID-19 pandemic		
2019	(Spain) Cristina Bucșa	(Belarus) Shalimar Talbi	6–0, 6–4

=== Doubles ===
Year	Champions	Runners-up	Score
2026	(Spain) Celia Cerviño Ruiz (Spain) Alba Rey García	(Spain) Carmen Gallardo Guevara (Spain) Eugenia Zozaya Menéndez	6–4, 7–6^{(8–6)}
2025	(Norway) Malene Helgø (China) Shi Han	(France) Nahia Berecoechea (Bulgaria) Isabella Shinikova	6–3, 6–3
2024	(France) Estelle Cascino (Philippines) Alex Eala	(Bulgaria) Lia Karatancheva (Latvia) Diāna Marcinkēviča	6–3, 2–6, [10–4]
2023	(United Kingdom) Alicia Barnett (United Kingdom) Olivia Nicholls	(France) Estelle Cascino (Latvia) Diāna Marcinkēviča	6–3, 6–4
2022	Maria Bondarenko (Romania) Ioana Loredana Roșca	(Netherlands) Isabelle Haverlag (Lithuania) Justina Mikulskytė	4–6, 6–4, [11–9]
2021	(Australia) Olivia Gadecki (Spain) Rebeka Masarova	(Spain) Celia Cerviño Ruiz (United Kingdom) Olivia Nicholls	6–3, 6–3
2020	Tournament cancelled due to the COVID-19 pandemic		
2019	(Mexico) Victoria Rodríguez (Mexico) Ana Sofía Sánchez	(Spain) Alba Carrillo Marín (Spain) Ángela Fita Boluda	6–3, 6–3
