= Rebeka Masarova =

Spanish–Swiss tennis player (born 1999)

- Masarova at the 2026 Wimbledon Championships
- Country (sports): Switzerland (2013–2017, 2024–); Spain (2018–2024)
- Residence: Basel, Switzerland
- Born: 6 August 1999 (age 27) Basel
- Height: 1.86 m (6 ft 1 in)
- Plays: Right (two-handed backhand)
- Coach: Marcos Roy
- Prize money: US$ 2,190,428

Singles
- Career record: 290–183
- Career titles: 6 ITF
- Highest ranking: No. 62 (11 December 2023)
- Current ranking: No. 160 (9 November 2026)

Grand Slam singles results
- Australian Open: 2R (2024)
- French Open: 1R (2023, 2024)
- Wimbledon: 2R (2023)
- US Open: 2R (2021, 2023)

Doubles
- Career record: 78–43
- Career titles: 1 WTA Challenger
- Highest ranking: No. 125 (2 October 2023)

Grand Slam doubles results
- Australian Open: 2R (2024)
- French Open: 1R (2023)
- Wimbledon: 2R (2023)
- US Open: 2R (2023)

Team competitions
- Fed Cup: 3–4
- Last updated on: 11 November 2026.

Rebeka Masarova (Slovak: Rebeka Masárová, pronounced [ˈrebeka ˈmasaːrɔʋa]; born 6 August 1999) is a Swiss professional tennis player. She has career-high WTA rankings of No. 62 in singles and No. 125 in doubles, both achieved in 2023. Masarova won the juniors' competition of the 2016 French Open.

== Personal life ==
Masarova's mother is Spanish and her father is Slovak. Born in Basel, hometown of Roger Federer, she was inspired to start playing tennis from watching Federer play in his first Wimbledon final in 2003.

She started representing Spain in January 2018. On 24 December 2024, she announced that she would represent Switzerland again.

== Career ==
=== Juniors ===
In 2016, Masarova reached the juniors semifinals of the Australian Open, where she lost to defending champion Tereza Mihalíková. Later that year, she won the French Open junior title by defeating second seed Amanda Anisimova in the final. Masarova was defeated by British wildcard entrant Gabriella Taylor in the third round of the junior tournament at Wimbledon.

As top seed, she was runner-up in the girls' singles at the 2017 Australian Open, losing to 11th seed Marta Kostyuk in the final.

=== Professional ===
==== 2016: Semifinal on WTA Tour debut ====
Aged 16, Masarova made her WTA Tour singles main-draw debut as a wildcard entrant at the Gstaad Ladies Championship defeating former world No. 1, Jelena Janković, in the first round. She then overcame Anett Kontaveit and fifth seed Annika Beck to reach the semifinals, at which point she lost to fellow Swiss player and eventual champion Viktorija Golubic.

==== 2021–2022: Major debut, WTA 125 doubles title ====
Masarova made her major main-draw debut at the 2021 US Open as a qualifier. She reached the second round defeating Ana Bogdan 6–7^{(9)}, 7–6^{(2)}, 7–6^{(9)} in the longest women's match at this major in the Open Era. Masarova lost to fifth seed Elina Svitolina in the second round.

Partnering with Aliona Bolsova, Masarova won the doubles at the Open Internacional de Valencia, defeating Alexandra Panova and Arantxa Rus in the final.

She was runner-up at the 2022 WTA 125 Swedish Open, losing to Jang Su-jeong in the final. Masarova defeated eighth seed Maria Sakkari in the first round at the 2023 US Open, before losing her next match to Anna Karolína Schmiedlová.

==== 2023–2024: Maiden WTA Tour final ====
Masarova reached her first WTA Tour final at the Auckland Open as a qualifier, which she lost to Coco Gauff. This catapulted her into the top 100 for the first time in her career. At the Dubai, she qualified for the main draw but lost to Aliaksandra Sasnovich in the first round.

Masarova received a wildcard for the main draw of the WTA 1000 Madrid Open where she reached the third round with wins over compatriot Cristina Bucșa and 20th seed Donna Vekić. She lost to ninth seed Maria Sakkari

She reached the final at the WTA 125 Solgironès Open, losing to sixth seed María Lourdes Carlé in three sets.

At the 2024 Thailand Open 2, Masarova defeated Anna Bondár and third seed Wang Xinyu to make it into the quarterfinals, at which point her run was ended by Laura Siegemund.

==== 2025–2026: Three WTA 1000 third rounds ====
Masarova qualified for the main-draw of the WTA 1000 2025 Miami Open and overcame fellow qualifier Greet Minnen and 21st seed Donna Vekić, before losing to 14th seed and defending champion Danielle Collins in the third round.

As a qualifier at the Madrid Open, Masarova defeated Ajla Tomljanović and 22nd seed Yulia Putintseva to reach the third round of her second WTA 1000 event in succession, at which point she lost to Peyton Stearns. The following week, she was runner-up at the WTA 125 2025 Catalonia Open, losing to Dalma Gálfi in the final.

At the 2026 ATX Open, Masarova qualified for the main draw and recorded wins over third seed Wang Xinyu and fellow qualifier Whitney Osuigwe to make it through to her first WTA Tour quarterfinal since 2024. She lost to wildcard entrant Taylor Townsend in the last eight.

Having made it through qualifying at the 2026 Italian Open, she recorded three-set wins over Oksana Selekhmeteva and 25th seed Leylah Fernandez, before being double bagelled by fifth seed Jessica Pegula in the third round.

== Performance timelines ==
Key
W	F	SF	QF	#R	RR	Q#	P#	DNQ	A	Z#	PO	G	S	B	NMS	NTI	P	NH

(W) winner; (F) finalist; (SF) semifinalist; (QF) quarterfinalist; (#R) rounds 4, 3, 2, 1; (RR) round-robin stage; (Q#) qualification round; (P#) preliminary round; (DNQ) did not qualify; (A) absent; (Z#) Davis/Fed Cup Zonal Group (with number indication) or (PO) play-off; (G) gold, (S) silver or (B) bronze Olympic/Paralympic medal; (NMS) not a Masters tournament; (NTI) not a Tier I tournament; (P) postponed; (NH) not held; (SR) strike rate (events won / competed); (W–L) win–loss record.
To avoid confusion and double counting, these charts are updated at the conclusion of a tournament or when the player's participation has ended.

Only main-draw results in WTA Tour, Grand Slam tournaments, Billie Jean King Cup, Hopman Cup, United Cup and Olympic Games are included in win–loss records.

=== Singles ===
Current through the 2026 US Open.

Tournament	2016	2017	...	2021	2022	2023	2024	2025	2026	SR	W–L	Win %
Grand Slam tournaments
Australian Open	A	A		A	Q3	Q2	2R	Q3	Q2	0 / 1	1–1	
French Open	A	A		A	Q1	1R	1R	Q3	Q1	0 / 2	0–2	
Wimbledon	A	A		A	1R	2R	1R	Q2	Q1	0 / 3	1–3	
US Open	A	A		2R	Q2	2R	Q1	1R	Q1	0 / 3	2–3	
Win–Loss	0–0	0–0		1–1	0–1	2–3	1–3	0–1	0–0	0 / 9	4–9	
WTA 1000 tournaments
Qatar Open	A	NTI		NTI	A	NTI	Q1	Q2	Q1	0 / 0	0–0	
Dubai Championships	NTI	A		A	NTI	1R	Q1	A	A	0 / 1	0–1	
Indian Wells Open	A	A		A	Q1	1R	1R	A	Q1	0 / 2	0–2	
Miami Open	A	A		A	A	Q1	Q1	3R	1R	0 / 2	2–2	
Madrid Open	A	A		A	A	3R	Q1	3R	Q2	0 / 2	4–2	
Italian Open	A	A		A	A	Q2	1R	A	3R	0 / 2	2–2	
Canadian Open	A	A		A	A	A	Q1	A	A	0 / 0	0–0	
Cincinnati Open	A	A		A	A	Q1	A	Q2	A	0 / 0	0–0	
China Open	A	A		NH		Q1	Q1	Q2	A	0 / 0	0–0	
Wuhan Open	A	A		NH			A	A	A	0 / 0	0–0	
Win–Loss	0–0	0–0		0–0	0–0	2–3	0–2	4–2	2–2	0 / 9	8–9	
Career statistics
	2016	2017	...	2021	2022	2023	2024	2025	2026	SR	W–L	Win %
Tournaments	1	2		2	4	14	12	4	4	Career total: 43		
Titles	0	0		0	0	0	0	0	0	Career total: 0		
Finals	0	0		0	0	1	0	0	0	Career total: 1		
Hard win–loss	0–0	0–1		1–2	0–1	11–9	3–5	2–2	3–3	0 / 23	20–23	
Clay win–loss	3–1	0–1		0–0	0–2	2–4	2–4	2–1	2–1	0 / 12	11–14	
Grass win–loss	0–0	0–0		0–0	0–1	3–3	0–3	1–1	0–0	0 / 8	4–8	
Overall win–loss	3–1	0–2		1–2	0–4	16–16	5–12	5–4	5–4	0 / 43	35–45	
Year-end ranking (Note: 2018: WTA ranking - 760, 2019: WTA ranking - 564, 2020: WTA ranking - 717.)	322	439		162	132	65	149	118		$2,187,928		

=== Doubles ===
Current through the 2023 Hopman Cup.

Tournament	2017	...	2021	2022	2023	SR	W–L	Win %
Grand Slam tournaments
Australian Open	A		A	A	A	0 / 0	0–0	
French Open	A		A	A	1R	0 / 1	0–1	
Wimbledon	A		A	A	2R	0 / 1	1–1	
US Open	A		A	A		0 / 0	0–0	
Win–Loss	0–0		0–0	0–0	1–2	0 / 2	1–2	
National representation
Billie Jean King Cup (Note: Formerly known as Fed Cup until 2020.)	A		RR	RR	RR	0 / 2	2–2	
Career statistics
Tournaments	1		0 (Note: During the season, she did not play in the main-draw of any WTA Tour-level tournaments. However, she played at the Billie Jean King Cup, which is not counted as a played tournament but as matches counted.)	0	3	Career total: 4		
Overall win-loss	0–1		1–0	1–1	1–6	0 / 4	3–8	27%
Year-end ranking (Note: 2013: WTA ranking - 1016, 2014: WTA ranking - n/a, 2015: WTA ranking - n/a, 2016: WTA ranking - 948, ... 2018: WTA ranking - 1156, 2019: WTA ranking - 305, 2020: WTA ranking - 337.)	667		269	189	158			

== WTA Tour finals ==
=== Singles: 1 (runner-up) ===
Legend WTA 250 (0–1)	Finals by surface Hard (0–1)

Result	Date	Tournament	Tier	Surface	Opponent	Score
Loss	Jan 2023	Auckland Open, New Zealand	WTA 250	Hard	(United States) Coco Gauff	1–6, 1–6

== WTA 125 finals ==
=== Singles: 4 (3 runner-ups, 1 pending) ===
Result	W–L	Date	Tournament	Surface	Opponent	Score
Loss	0–1	Jul 2022	Båstad Open, Sweden	Clay	(South Korea) Jang Su-jeong	6–3, 3–6, 1–6
Loss	0–2	Apr 2024	Solgironès Open, Spain	Clay	(Argentina) María Lourdes Carlé	6–3, 1–6, 2–6
Loss	0–3	Apr 2025	Catalonia Open, Spain	Clay	(Hungary) Dalma Gálfi	3–6, 0–6
Pending	–	Nov 2026	Colina Challenger, Chile	Clay	(Spain) Leyre Romero Gormaz	

=== Doubles: 2 (1 title, 1 runner-up) ===
Result	W–L	Date	Tournament	Surface	Partner	Opponents	Score
Win	1–0	Jun 2022	Internacional de Valencia, Spain	Clay	(Spain) Aliona Bolsova	(Russia) Alexandra Panova (Netherlands) Arantxa Rus	6–0, 6–3
Loss	1–1	Jun 2023	Solgironès Open, Spain	Clay	(Spain) Aliona Bolsova	(United States) Caroline Dolehide (Russia) Diana Shnaider	6–7^{(5–7)}, 3–6

== ITF Circuit finals ==
=== Singles: 12 (6 titles, 6 runner-ups) ===
Legend W100 tournaments (0–1) W60 tournaments (2–0) W25 tournaments (2–0) 15k / W15 tournaments (2–5)	Finals by surface Hard (3–1) Clay (3–5)

Result	W–L	Date	Tournament	Tier	Surface	Opponent	Score
Loss	0–1	Sep 2017	ITF Madrid, Spain	15k	Hard	(Spain) Nuria Párrizas Díaz	4–6, 6–4, 2–6
Loss	0–2	Oct 2017	ITF Riba-roja de Túria, Spain	15k	Clay	(Australia) Isabelle Wallace	3–6, 3–6
Win	1–2	Sep 2018	ITF Badenweiler, Germany	15k	Clay	(Switzerland) Nina Stadler	6–2, 7–5
Loss	1–3	Jan 2019	ITF Manacor, Spain	W15	Clay	(Romania) Ioana Loredana Roșca	2–6, 0–6
Win	2–3	Mar 2019	ITF Amiens, France	W15	Clay (i)	(Romania) Oana Georgeta Simion	6–0, 6–3
Loss	2–4	Mar 2019	ITF Gonesse, France	W15	Clay (i)	(Luxembourg) Eléonora Molinaro	2–6, 6–2, 4–6
Loss	2–5	Mar 2020	ITF Heraklion, Greece	W15	Clay	(Czech Republic) Miriam Kolodziejová	4–6, 4–6
Win	3–5	May 2021	ITF Platja d'Aro, Spain	W25	Clay	(Spain) Irene Burillo	6–3, 3–6, 6–2
Win	4–5	Jun 2021	ITF Palma del Río, Spain	W25	Hard	(Switzerland) Lulu Sun	6–3, 1–6, 7–6^{(7–4)}
Win	5–5	Jul 2021	Open Araba en Femenino, Spain	W60	Hard	(Spain) Ane Mintegi del Olmo	7–6^{(7–3)}, 6–4
Win	6–5	Oct 2022	Hamburg Ladies & Gents Cup, Germany	W60	Hard (i)	(Belgium) Ysaline Bonaventure	6–4, 6–3
Loss	6–6	Apr 2023	Oeiras Ladies Open, Portugal	W100	Clay	(Montenegro) Danka Kovinić	2–6, 2–6

=== Doubles: 13 (8 titles, 5 runner-ups) ===
Legend W100 tournaments (1–0) W80 tournaments (1–0) W60 tournaments (3–1) 25k tournaments (0–1) 15k / W15 tournaments (3–3)	Finals by surface Hard (3–2) Clay (5–3)

Result	W–L	Date	Tournament	Tier	Surface	Partner	Opponents	Score
Win	1–0	Apr 2017	ITF Dijon, France	15k	Hard (i)	(Latvia) Diāna Marcinkēviča	(France) Victoria Muntean (Ukraine) Anastasia Zarytska	6–4, 6–3
Loss	1–1	May 2017	Wiesbaden Open, Germany	25k	Clay	(Latvia) Diāna Marcinkēviča	(Germany) Vivian Heisen (Australia) Storm Sanders	5–7, 7–5, [8–10]
Win	2–1	Jan 2019	ITF Manacor, Spain	W15	Clay	(Spain) Yvonne Cavallé Reimers	(Germany) Irina Cantos Siemers (Spain) Júlia Payola	6–4, 6–3
Win	3–1	Feb 2019	ITF Manacor, Spain	W15	Clay	(Spain) Claudia Hoste Ferrer	(Japan) Rina Saigo (Japan) Yukina Saigo	7–5, 6–3
Win	4–1	Jun 2019	Bella Cup Toruń, Poland	W60	Clay	(Slovakia) Rebecca Šramková	(United States) Robin Anderson (Ukraine) Anhelina Kalinina	6–4, 3–6, [10–4]
Win	5–1	Sep 2019	Open de Valencia, Spain	W60	Clay	(Romania) Irina Bara	(Venezuela) Andrea Gámiz (Australia) Seone Mendez	6–4, 7–6^{(2)}
Loss	5–2	Mar 2020	ITF Heraklion, Greece	W15	Clay	(Romania) Ioana Gașpar	(Serbia) Tamara Čurović (Sweden) Fanny Östlund	4–6, 5–7
Loss	5–3	Mar 2021	ITF Manacor, Spain	W15	Hard	(Switzerland) Ylena In-Albon	(Spain) Ángela Fita Boluda (Russia) Oksana Selekhmeteva	2–6, 7–5, [8–10]
Loss	5–4	Apr 2021	ITF Monastir, Tunisia	W15	Hard	(Latvia) Daniela Vismane	(Romania) Karola Bejenaru (Romania) Ilona Georgiana Ghioroaie	2–6, 0–6
Win	6–4	Jul 2021	Open Araba en Femenino, Spain	W60	Hard	(Australia) Olivia Gadecki	(Spain) Celia Cerviño Ruiz (United Kingdom) Olivia Nicholls	6–3, 6–3
Win	7–4	Oct 2022	ITF Les Franqueses del Vallès, Spain	W100	Hard	(Spain) Aliona Bolsova	(Japan) Misaki Doi (Indonesia) Beatrice Gumulya	7–5, 1–6, [10–3]
Win	8–4	Nov 2022	Open Villa de Madrid, Spain	W80	Clay	(Spain) Aliona Bolsova	(Croatia) Lea Bošković (Latvia) Daniela Vismane	6–3, 6–3
Loss	8–5	Feb 2025	ITF Prague, Czech Republic	W75	Hard (i)	(Australia) Priscilla Hon	(Czech Republic) Jesika Malečková (Czech Republic) Miriam Škoch	0–6, 2–6

== Junior Grand Slam tournament finals ==
=== Singles: 2 (1 title, 1 runner-up) ===
Result	Year	Tournament	Surface	Opponent	Score
Win	2016	French Open	Clay	(United States) Amanda Anisimova	7–5, 7–5
Loss	2017	Australian Open	Hard	(Ukraine) Marta Kostyuk	5–7, 6–1, 4–6

== Wings against top 10 players ==
- She has a 1–4 (20%) record against players who were, at the time the match was played, ranked in the top 10.

No.	Player	Rk	Event	Surface	Rd	Score	Rk	Years	Ref
1	(Greece) Maria Sakkari	8	US Open, United States	Hard	1R	6–4, 6–4	71	2023	

- Key: (Rk) first use, opponent rank; (Rd) round; (Rk) 2nd use, player rank; (Ref) reference; (F) final; (SF) semifinal; (QF) quarterfinal; (#R) rounds 4, 3, 2, 1; (RR) round-robin stage; (Q#) qualifying rounds or stages (3), 2, 1.

== Double bagel matches ==
Result	Year	W–L	Tournament	Tier	Surface	Opponent	Rank	Rd	RMR
Win	2013	1–0	ITF Benicarlo, Spain	25,000	Clay	(Spain) Ester Valles Pinol	n/a	Q1	n/a
Win	2015	2–0	ITF Madrid, Spain	10,000	Hard	(Spain) Yulia Almiron Solano (WC)	n/a	Q1	n/a
Win	2020	3–0	ITF Heraklion, Greece	15,000	Clay	(Italy) Gaia Squarcialupi	n/a	Q2	717
Win	2021	4–0	ITF Madrid, Spain	25,000	Hard	(Spain) Amanda Montes Khaghani	n/a	Q2	443
Win	2022	5–0	Iași Open, Romania	WTA 125	Clay	(Australia) Olivia Tjandramulia (LL)	413	1R	751
