= Celia Cerviño Ruiz =

Spanish tennis player (born 1997)

- Country (sports): Spain
- Born: December 14, 1997 (age 28) A Estrada, Pontevedra
- Plays: Right (two-handed backhand)
- Prize money: $69,669

Singles
- Career record: 183–139
- Highest ranking: No. 504 (August 08, 2022)
- Current ranking: No. 727 (July 20, 2026)

Doubles
- Career record: 111–77
- Highest ranking: No. 305 (May 16, 2022)
- Current ranking: No. 399 (July 20, 2026)
- Last updated on: July 21, 2026.

Celia Cerviño Ruiz (born December 14, 1997) is a Spanish professional tennis player. She has a career-high doubles ranking by the WTA of No. 305, achieved on 16 May 2022.

== Early life ==
Born in A Estrada, Cerviño Ruiz trained at the Pontevedra Tennis Club. She playing tennis at the age of eight. Her favorite surface is hard court, and her tennis idol is Justine Henin.

== Career ==
Partnering Alba Rey García, Cerviño Ruiz won the ITF W75 2026 Open Araba en Femenino, defeating Carmen Gallardo Guevara and Eugenia Zozaya Menéndez in the final. She won the first major professional championship of her career.

== ITF Circuit finals ==
=== Singles: 9 (4 titles, 5 runner-ups) ===
Legend W35 tournaments (0–1) W15 tournaments (4–4)	Finals by surface Hard (3–5) Clay (1–0)

Result	W–L	Date	Tournament	Tier	Surface	Opponent	Score
Win	1–0	Oct 2019	ITF Lousada, Portugal	W15	Hard (i)	(Romania) Ioana Loredana Roșca	0–6, 7–6^{(5)}, 6–3
Loss	1–1	May 2021	ITF Santa Margarita de Montbui, Spain	W15	Hard	(Lithuania) Justina Mikulskytė	2–6, 0–6
Win	2–1	Nov 2021	ITF Castellón, Spain	W15	Clay	(Argentina) Lucía Peyre	5–7, 6–1, 7–6^{(2)}
Loss	2–2	Nov 2021	ITF Lousada, Portugal	W15	Hard (i)	(Italy) Angelica Moratelli	3–6, 6–1, 6–7^{(11)}
Loss	2–3	Nov 2022	ITF Lousada, Portugal	W15	Hard (i)	(Sweden) Kajsa Rinaldo Persson	5–7, 2–6
Win	3–3	Aug 2024	ITF Valladolid, Spain	W15	Hard	(Latvia) Sabīne Rutlauka	4–6, 6–1, 6–1
Win	4–3	Nov 2024	ITF Alcalá de Henares, Spain	W15	Hard	(China) Tian Jialin	2–6, 7–6^{(0)}, 6–4
Loss	4–4	Aug 2026	ITF Torelló, Spain	W15	Hard	(United States) Anne Christine Lutkemeyer	6–4, 0–6, 4–6
Loss	4–5	Oct 2026	ITF Lagos, Portugal	W35	Hard	(India) Maaya Rajeshwaran	4–6, 2–6

=== Doubles: 27 (9 titles, 18 runner-ups) ===
Legend W60/75 tournaments (1–1) W25/35 tournaments (0–6) W15 tournaments (8–11)	Finals by surface Hard (7–14) Clay (2–2) Carpet (0–2)

Result	W–L	Date	Tournament	Tier	Surface	Partner	Opponents	Score
Win	1–0	Sep 2019	ITF Santarém, Portugal	W15	Hard	(Portugal) Matilde Jorge	(Portugal) Sara Lança (Russia) Ekaterina Shalimova	6–3, 6–2
Win	2–0	Oct 2019	ITF Lousada, Portugal	W15	Hard (i)	(Spain) Ángeles Moreno Barranquero	(Portugal) Francisca Jorge (Spain) Olga Parres Azcoitia	6–3, 7–5
Win	3–0	Nov 2019	ITF Heraklion, Greece	W15	Clay	(Spain) Alba Carrillo Marín	(Spain) Claudia Hoste Ferrer (Russia) Polina Leykina	7–6^{(6)}, 6–1
Loss	3–1	Feb 2020	ITF Palma Nova, Spain	W15	Clay	(Spain) María Gutiérrez Carrasco	(Spain) Yvonne Cavallé Reimers (Spain) Ángela Fita Boluda	2–6, 6–7^{(5)}
Loss	3–2	Feb 2020	GB Pro-Series Sunderland, United Kingdom	W25	Hard (i)	(Spain) María Gutiérrez Carrasco	(United Kingdom) Alicia Barnett (United Kingdom) Olivia Nicholls	4–6, 6–7^{(8)}
Loss	3–3	Dec 2020	ITF Monastir, Tunisia	W15	Hard	(Denmark) Olivia Gram	(Bosnia and Herzegovina) Nefisa Berberović (Bosnia and Herzegovina) Anita Wagner	4–6, 4–6
Loss	3–4	Dec 2020	ITF Monastir, Tunisia	W15	Hard	(Spain) Yvonne Cavallé Reimers	(Poland) Weronika Falkowska (Belarus) Yuliya Hatouka	4–6, 5–7
Loss	3–5	May 2021	ITF Santa Margarita de Montbui, Spain	W15	Hard	(United Kingdom) Olivia Nicholls	(Argentina) Victoria Bosio (Lithuania) Justina Mikulskytė	6–4, 1–6, [7–10]
Loss	3–6	Jun 2021	Open Villa de Madrid, Spain	W25	Hard	(Spain) Yvonne Cavallé Reimers	(United States) Ashley Lahey (Australia) Olivia Tjandramulia	2–6, 6–4, [8–10]
Loss	3–7	Jul 2021	Open Araba en Femenino, Spain	W60	Hard	(United Kingdom) Olivia Nicholls	(Australia) Olivia Gadecki (Spain) Rebeka Masarova	3–6, 3–6
Loss	3–8	Sep 2021	ITF Leiria, Portugal	W25	Hard	(Italy) Angelica Moratelli	(Brazil) Carolina Alves (Russia) Anastasia Tikhonova	4–6, 4–6
Win	4–8	Nov 2021	ITF Lousada, Portugal	W15	Hard (i)	(Portugal) Matilde Jorge	(Netherlands) Jasmijn Gimbrère (Australia) Alicia Smith	6–1, 6–4
Win	5–8	Dec 2021	ITF Monastir, Tunisia	W15	Hard	(Hong Kong) Maggie Ng	(Switzerland) Jenny Dürst (Hong Kong) Cody Wong	6–2, 6–4
Loss	5–9	May 2022	ITF Tossa de Mar, Spain	W25	Carpet	(Spain) Yvonne Cavallé Reimers	(Spain) Marina Bassols Ribera (Romania) Ioana Loredana Roșca	5–7, 0–6
Loss	5–10	Jun 2022	ITF Palma del Río, Spain	W25+H	Hard	(Lithuania) Justina Mikulskytė	Valeria Savinykh (Hungary) Fanny Stollár	6–7^{(3)}, 2–6
Loss	5–11	Nov 2022	ITF Lousada, Portugal	W15	Hard (i)	(Switzerland) Tess Sugnaux	(France) Océane Babel (Switzerland) Leonie Küng	6–7^{(3)}, 7–5, [2–10]
Loss	5–12	Aug 2024	ITF Valladolid, Spain	W15	Hard	(Portugal) Ana Filipa Santos	(Germany) Kathleen Kanev (United Kingdom) Eliz Maloney	2–6, 6–4, [4–10]
Loss	5–13	Nov 2024	ITF Alcalá de Henares, Spain	W15	Hard	(Spain) Claudia Ferrer Pérez	(Portugal) Anna Hertel (Serbia) Katarina Jokić	6–7^{(3)}, 4–6
Loss	5–14	Mar 2025	ITF Solarino, Italy	W35	Carpet	(Spain) Lucía Cortez Llorca	(Japan) Hiromi Abe (Japan) Hikaru Sato	2–6, 3–6
Loss	5–15	Oct 2025	ITF Villena, Spain	W15	Hard	(Italy) Enola Chiesa	(Germany) Elena Giovanna Giessler (Spain) Maria Oliver Sanchez	4–6, 3–6
Loss	5–16	Nov 2025	ITF Castellón, Spain	W15	Clay	(Switzerland) Marie Mettraux	(Spain) Noelia Bouzó Zanotti (Germany) Joëlle Steur	3–6, 2–6
Win	6–16	Nov 2025	ITF Lousada, Portugal	W15	Hard (i)	(Italy) Valentina Losciale	(United States) Baylen Brown (United States) Jamilah Snells	6–3, 6–3
Loss	6–17	Nov 2025	ITF Lousada, Portugal	W15	Hard (i)	(Italy) Valentina Losciale	(Portugal) Ana Filipa Santos (Portugal) Angelina Voloshchuk	4–6, 4–6
Loss	6–18	Apr 2026	ITF Madrid, Spain	W15	Hard	(Slovakia) Tamara Šramková	(Kazakhstan) Asylzhan Arystanbekova (Kazakhstan) Ingkar Dyussebay	4–6, 6–2, [6–10]
Win	7–18	May 2026	ITF Grado, Italy	W15	Clay	(France) Cindy Langlais	(Greece) Marianne Argyrokastriti (Ukraine) Daria Yesypchuk	6–1, 3–6, [13–11]
Win	8–18	Jul 2026	Open Araba en Femenino, Spain	W75	Hard	(Spain) Alba Rey García	(Spain) Carmen Gallardo Guevara (Spain) Eugenia Zozaya Menéndez	6–4, 7–6^{(6)}
Win	9–18	Aug 2026	ITF Torelló, Spain	W15	Hard	(Spain) Aliona Bolsova	(Mexico) Julia García Ruiz (Spain) Ariadna Garcia-Patrón Canals	6–2, 6–2
