= Ane Mintegi del Olmo =

Spanish tennis player (born 2003)

- Country (sports): Spain
- Born: 24 October 2003 (age 23) Idiazabal, Spain
- Plays: Right-handed
- Prize money: $88,891

Singles
- Career record: 123–73
- Career titles: 7 ITF
- Highest ranking: No. 241 (20 April 2026)
- Current ranking: No. 273 (31 August 2026)

Doubles
- Career record: 4–8
- Highest ranking: No. 789 (20 September 2021)
- Last updated on: 3 September 2026.

Ane Mintegi del Olmo (born 24 October 2003) is a Spanish tennis player. She has a career-high singles ranking by the Women's Tennis Association (WTA) of No. 241, achieved on 20 April 2026.

Mintegi won the girls' singles title at the 2021 Wimbledon Championships.

== ITF Circuit finals ==
=== Singles: 13 (8 titles, 5 runner-ups) ===
Legend W60/75 tournaments W50 tournaments W25/35 tournaments W15 tournaments	Finals by surface Hard (0–1) Clay (8–4)

Result	W–L	Date	Tournament	Tier	Surface	Opponent	Score
Loss	0–1	Apr 2021	ITF Antalya, Turkey	W15	Clay	(Romania) Andreea Prisăcariu	3–6, 5–7
Loss	0–2	Jul 2021	Open Araba en Femenino, Spain	W60	Hard	(Spain) Rebeka Masarova	6–7^{(3)}, 4–6
Loss	0–3	Oct 2023	ITF Santa Margherita di Pula, Italy	W25	Clay	(Italy) Giorgia Pedone	2–6, 5–7
Win	1–3	Nov 2023	ITF Heraklion, Greece	W25	Clay	(Romania) Cristina Dinu	6–2, 6–3
Win	2–3	May 2025	ITF Platja d'Aro, Spain	W35	Clay	(Switzerland) Jenny Dürst	3–6, 6–1, 6–3
Win	3–3	Jul 2025	ITF Turin, Italy	W35	Clay	(Greece) Valentini Grammatikopoulou	6–3, 6–1
Win	4–3	Oct 2025	ITF Seville, Spain	W35	Clay	(Spain) Lucía Cortez Llorca	6–2, 6–1
Win	5–3	Mar 2026	ITF Heraklion, Greece	W35	Clay	Darya Astakhova	6–1 ret.
Win	6–3	May 2026	ITF Platja d'Aro, Spain	W35	Clay	(Burundi) Sada Nahimana	6–0, 6–3
Win	7–3	Sep 2026	ITF Plovdiv, Bulgaria	W50	Clay	(Bulgaria) Elizara Yaneva	2–6, 6–1, 6–3
Win	8–3	Oct 2026	ITF Burgas, Bulgaria	W50	Clay	(Ukraine) Anastasiia Sobolieva	5–7, 6–4, 6–0
Loss	8–4	Oct 2026	ITF Santa Margherita di Pula, Italy	W35	Clay	(Italy) Jennifer Ruggeri	5–7, 2–6
Loss	8–5	Nov 2026	ITF Heraklion, Greece	W35	Clay	(Czech Republic) Alisa Oktiabreva	3–6, 3–6

== Junior Grand Slam tournament finals ==
=== Singles: 1 (title) ===
Result	Year	Tournament	Surface	Opponent	Score
Win	2021	Wimbledon	Grass	(Germany) Nastasja Schunk	2–6, 6–4, 6–1
