= 2022 Torneig Internacional de Tennis Femení Solgironès =

Tennis tournament

- Date: 9–15 May 2022
- Edition: 6th
- Category: ITF Women's World Tennis Tour
- Prize money: $100,000+H
- Surface: Clay / Outdoor
- Location: La Bisbal d'Empordà, Spain

Champions

Singles
- (China) Wang Xinyu

Doubles
- (Andorra) Victoria Jiménez Kasintseva / (Mexico) Renata Zarazúa
← 2021 ·	Torneig Internacional de Tennis Femení Solgironès	· 2023 →

The 2022 Torneig Internacional de Tennis Femení Solgironès was a professional tennis tournament played on outdoor clay courts. It was the sixth edition of the tournament which was part of the 2022 ITF Women's World Tennis Tour. It took place in La Bisbal d'Empordà, Spain between 9 and 15 May 2022.

== Singles main draw entrants ==
=== Seeds ===
Country	Player	Rank^{1}	Seed
NED	Arantxa Rus	74	1
CHN	Wang Xinyu	85	2
MNE	Danka Kovinić	114	3
ESP	Rebeka Masarova	133	4
HUN	Réka Luca Jani	139	5
ITA	Sara Errani	156	6
AUS	Olivia Gadecki	166	7
USA	Asia Muhammad	167	8

- ^{1} Rankings are as of 25 April 2022.

=== Other entrants ===
The following players received wildcards into the singles main draw:

- (Spain) Marina Bassols Ribera
- (Spain) Jéssica Bouzas Maneiro
- (Spain) Irene Burillo Escorihuela
- (Argentina) Solana Sierra

The following players received entry from the qualifying draw:

- Erika Andreeva
- (Spain) Yvonne Cavallé Reimers
- (Italy) Cristiana Ferrando
- (Romania) Ilona Georgiana Ghioroaie
- (Israel) Lina Glushko
- (Spain) Guiomar Maristany
- (Romania) Andreea Prisăcariu
- (Latvia) Daniela Vismane

== Champions ==
=== Singles ===
- (China) Wang Xinyu def. Erika Andreeva, 3–6, 7–6^{(7–0)}, 6–0

=== Doubles ===
- (Andorra) Victoria Jiménez Kasintseva / (Mexico) Renata Zarazúa def. (United Kingdom) Alicia Barnett / (United Kingdom) Olivia Nicholls, 6–4, 2–6, [10–8]
