= 2021 Solgironès Open Catalunya – Singles =

Singles
- 2021 Solgironès Open Catalunya

Final
- Champion: (Russia) Irina Khromacheva
- Runner-up: (Netherlands) Arantxa Rus
- Score: 6–4, 1–6, 7–6^{(10–8)}

Events
| Singles | Doubles |
| ← 2019 · | Solgironès Open Catalunya | · 2022 → |

Wang Xiyu was the defending champion having won the previous edition in 2019 but chose not to participate.

Irina Khromacheva won the title, defeating Arantxa Rus in the final, 6–4, 1–6, 7–6^{(10–8)}.

== Seeds ==
1. (Netherlands) Arantxa Rus (final)
2. (Slovenia) Kaja Juvan (first round)
3. (Slovakia) Viktória Kužmová (second round)
4. (Hungary) Tímea Babos (first round)
5. (Germany) Anna-Lena Friedsam (second round)
6. (Switzerland) Stefanie Vögele (first round)
7. (Belgium) Greet Minnen (quarterfinals)
8. (Belgium) Ysaline Bonaventure (first round)

== Draw ==
=== Key ===
- Q = Qualifier
- WC = Wild card
- LL = Lucky loser
- Alt = Alternate
- SE = Special exempt
- PR = Protected ranking
- ITF = ITF entry
- JE = Junior exempt
- w/o = Walkover
- r = Retired
- d = Defaulted
- SR = Special ranking

=== Finals ===
Semifinals
1 | (Netherlands) Arantxa Rus | 6 | 6
Q | (Croatia) Tereza Mrdeža | 3 | 2
(Serbia) Olga Danilović | 6 | 5 | 0
PR | (Russia) Irina Khromacheva | 3 | 7 | 6

Final
1 | (Netherlands) Arantxa Rus | 4 | 6 | 6^{8}
PR | (Russia) Irina Khromacheva | 6 | 1 | 7^{10}

=== Top half ===
First round
1 | (Netherlands) A Rus | 6 | 6
(Turkey) Ç Büyükakçay | 2 | 2
Q | (Romania) A Prisăcariu | 4 | 6^{11}
(Serbia) N Kostić | 6 | 7^{13}
Q | (Spain) M Bassols Ribera | 6 | 6
WC | (United Kingdom) F Jones | 0 | 3
WC | (Spain) M Custic | 0 | 7^{7} | 6
8 | (Belgium) Y Bonaventure | 6 | 6^{4} | 2
3 | (Slovakia) V Kužmová | 6 | 7
Q | (Italy) C Ferrando | 4 | 5
Q | (Croatia) T Mrdeža | 6 | 7
(Luxembourg) M Minella | 2 | 5
(Georgia (country)) E Gorgodze | 6 | 6
(China) X You | 3 | 2
WC | (Andorra) V Jiménez Kasintseva | 6 | 3 | 6
6 | (Switzerland) S Vögele | 1 | 6 | 4

Second round
1 | (Netherlands) A Rus | 6 | 6
(Serbia) N Kostić | 2 | 2
Q | (Spain) M Bassols Ribera | 6 | 6
WC | (Spain) M Custic | 3 | 4
3 | (Slovakia) V Kužmová | 2 | 2
Q | (Croatia) T Mrdeža | 6 | 6
(Georgia (country)) E Gorgodze | 7^{9} | 7
WC | (Andorra) V Jiménez Kasintseva | 6^{7} | 5

Quarterfinals
1 | (Netherlands) A Rus | 7 | 6
Q | (Spain) M Bassols Ribera | 5 | 4
Q | (Croatia) T Mrdeža | 6 | 6
(Georgia (country)) E Gorgodze | 1 | 4

Semifinals
1 | (Netherlands) A Rus | 6 | 6
Q | (Croatia) T Mrdeža | 3 | 2

=== Bottom half ===
First round
5 | (Germany) A-L Friedsam | 1 | 6 | 4
(Russia) V Diatchenko | 6 | 2 | 0^{r}
Q | (Spain) G Maristany | 3 | 2
(Serbia) O Danilović | 6 | 6
(Ukraine) K Kozlova | 6 | 7
(Japan) C Muramatsu | 4 | 5
Q | (Italy) J Pieri | 1 | 6 | 7
4 | (Hungary) T Babos | 6 | 4 | 5
7 | (Belgium) G Minnen | 6 | 6
Q | (Spain) O Sáez Larra | 1 | 2
Q | (Switzerland) S Waltert | 7 | 7^{7}
(Germany) M Barthel | 5 | 6^{2}
WC | (Spain) A Mintegi del Olmo | 3 | 1
PR | (Russia) I Khromacheva | 6 | 6
(Spain) L Arruabarrena | 6 | 3 | 6
2 | (Slovenia) K Juvan | 1 | 6 | 4

Second round
5 | (Germany) A-L Friedsam | 2 | 7^{7} | 6^{2}
(Serbia) O Danilović | 6 | 6^{2} | 7^{7}
(Ukraine) K Kozlova | 0 | 6 | 4
Q | (Italy) J Pieri | 6 | 3 | 6
7 | (Belgium) G Minnen | 6 | 4 | 6
Q | (Switzerland) S Waltert | 3 | 6 | 4
PR | (Russia) I Khromacheva | 1 | 6 | 6
(Spain) L Arruabarrena | 6 | 3 | 3

Quarterfinals
(Serbia) O Danilović | 6 | 6
Q | (Italy) J Pieri | 4 | 4
7 | (Belgium) G Minnen | 3 | 3
PR | (Russia) I Khromacheva | 6 | 6

Semifinals
(Serbia) O Danilović | 6 | 5 | 0
PR | (Russia) I Khromacheva | 3 | 7 | 6
