= 2021 Solgironès Open Catalunya =

Tennis tournament

- Date: 10–16 May 2021
- Edition: 5th
- Category: ITF Women's World Tennis Tour
- Prize money: $60,000+H
- Surface: Clay
- Location: La Bisbal d'Empordà, Spain

Champions

Singles
- (Russia) Irina Khromacheva

Doubles
- (Russia) Valentina Ivakhnenko / (Romania) Andreea Prisăcariu
← 2019 ·	Solgironès Open Catalunya	· 2022 →

The 2021 Solgironès Open Catalunya was a professional women's tennis tournament played on outdoor clay courts. It was the fifth edition of the tournament which was part of the 2021 ITF Women's World Tennis Tour. It took place in La Bisbal d'Empordà, Spain between 10 and 16 May 2021.

== Singles main-draw entrants ==
=== Seeds ===
Country	Player	Rank^{1}	Seed
NED	Arantxa Rus	85	1
SLO	Kaja Juvan	99	2
SVK	Viktória Kužmová	106	3
HUN	Tímea Babos	107	4
GER	Anna-Lena Friedsam	111	5
SUI	Stefanie Vögele	127	6
BEL	Greet Minnen	129	7
BEL	Ysaline Bonaventure	130	8

- ^{1} Rankings are as of 26 April 2021.

=== Other entrants ===
The following players received wildcards into the singles main draw:

- (Spain) Marta Custic
- (Andorra) Victoria Jiménez Kasintseva
- (United Kingdom) Francesca Jones
- (Spain) Ane Mintegi del Olmo

The following player received entry using a protected ranking:

- (Russia) Irina Khromacheva

The following players received entry from the qualifying draw:

- (Spain) Marina Bassols Ribera
- (Italy) Cristiana Ferrando
- (Spain) Guiomar Maristany
- (Croatia) Tereza Mrdeža
- (Italy) Jessica Pieri
- (Romania) Andreea Prisăcariu
- (Spain) Olga Sáez Larra
- (Switzerland) Simona Waltert

== Champions ==
=== Singles ===
- (Russia) Irina Khromacheva def. (Netherlands) Arantxa Rus, 6–4, 1–6, 7–6^{(10–8)}

=== Doubles ===
- (Russia) Valentina Ivakhnenko / (Romania) Andreea Prisăcariu def. (Germany) Mona Barthel / (Luxembourg) Mandy Minella, 6–3, 6–1
