= 2022 Torneig Internacional de Tennis Femení Solgironès – Singles =

Singles
- 2022 Torneig Internacional de Tennis Femení Solgironès

Final
- Champion: (China) Wang Xinyu
- Runner-up: Erika Andreeva
- Score: 3–6, 7–6^{(7–0)}, 6–0

Events
Singles	Doubles
← 2021 ·	Torneig Internacional de Tennis Femení Solgironès	· 2023 →

Irina Khromacheva was the defending champion but chose not to participate.

Wang Xinyu won the title, defeating Erika Andreeva in the final, 3–6, 7–6^{(7–0)}, 6–0.

== Seeds ==
1. (Netherlands) Arantxa Rus (second round, retired)
2. (China) Wang Xinyu (champion)
3. (Montenegro) Danka Kovinić (first round, retired)
4. (Spain) Rebeka Masarova (quarterfinals)
5. (Hungary) Réka Luca Jani (second round)
6. (Italy) Sara Errani (first round)
7. (Australia) Olivia Gadecki (second round)
8. (United States) Asia Muhammad (semifinals)

== Draw ==
=== Key ===
- Q = Qualifier
- WC = Wild card
- LL = Lucky loser
- Alt = Alternate
- SE = Special exempt
- PR = Protected ranking
- ITF = ITF entry
- JE = Junior exempt
- w/o = Walkover
- r = Retired
- d = Defaulted
- SR = Special ranking

=== Finals ===
Semifinals
Q	Erika Andreeva	7	6^{3}	6
8	(United States) Asia Muhammad	5	7^{7}	3
(Andorra) Victoria Jiménez Kasintseva	1	6	1
2	(China) Wang Xinyu	6	3	6

Final
Q	Erika Andreeva	6	6^{0}	0
2	(China) Wang Xinyu	3	7^{7}	6

=== Top half ===
First round
1	(Netherlands) A Rus	6	6
(Australia) S Mendez	0	2
Q	(Romania) A Prisăcariu	6^{5}	4
Q	E Andreeva	7^{7}	6
(Mexico) R Zarazúa	6	6
WC	(Spain) I Burillo Escorihuela	2	4
WC	(Argentina) S Sierra	6	6
6	(Italy) S Errani	3	3
4	(Spain) R Masarova	6	6
Q	(Spain) Y Cavallé Reimers	3	1
Q	(Italy) C Ferrando	6	6
Q	(Israel) L Glushko	4	2
(United States) J Loeb	6	3	4
Q	(Romania) IG Ghioroaie	2	6	6
Q	(Spain) G Maristany	6	6^{5}	4
8	(United States) A Muhammad	4	7^{7}	6

Second round
1	(Netherlands) A Rus	6	3	0^{r}
Q	E Andreeva	4	6	2
(Mexico) R Zarazúa	6	6
WC	(Argentina) S Sierra	1	2
4	(Spain) R Masarova	6	4	6
Q	(Italy) C Ferrando	4	6	2
Q	(Romania) IG Ghioroaie	2	6^{2}
8	(United States) A Muhammad	6	7^{7}

Quarterfinals
Q	E Andreeva	6	6
(Mexico) R Zarazúa	2	3
4	(Spain) R Masarova	6	3	6^{5}
8	(United States) A Muhammad	1	6	7^{7}

Semifinals
Q	E Andreeva	7	6^{3}	6
8	(United States) A Muhammad	5	7^{7}	3

=== Bottom half ===
First round
5	(Hungary) RL Jani	6	6
(United States) C McNally	3	3
(Mexico) M Zacarías	3	3
(Andorra) V Jiménez Kasintseva	6	6
(Greece) D Papamichail	6	6
(Spain) A Bolsova	1	2
WC	(Spain) M Bassols Ribera	6	0
3	(Montenegro) D Kovinić	1	0^{r}
7	(Australia) O Gadecki	6	6
WC	(Spain) J Bouzas Maneiro	2	2
Q	(Latvia) D Vismane	7	6
O Selekhmeteva	5	2
(United States) G Min	2	3
(United States) F Di Lorenzo	6	6
(Spain) A Lázaro García	3	7	1
2	(China) Xin Wang	6	5	6

Second round
5	(Hungary) RL Jani	6^{9}	2
(Andorra) V Jiménez Kasintseva	7^{11}	6
(Greece) D Papamichail	6	5	3
WC	(Spain) M Bassols Ribera	4	7	6
7	(Australia) O Gadecki	3	5
Q	(Latvia) D Vismane	6	7
(United States) F Di Lorenzo	1	6	4
2	(China) Xin Wang	6	3	6

Quarterfinals
(Andorra) V Jiménez Kasintseva	6	6
WC	(Spain) M Bassols Ribera	0	3
Q	(Latvia) D Vismane	2	4
2	(China) Xin Wang	6	6

Semifinals
(Andorra) V Jiménez Kasintseva	1	6	1
2	(China) Xin Wang	6	3	6
