= 2019 Torneig Internacional de Tennis Femení Solgironès – Doubles =

Doubles
- 2019 Torneig Internacional de Tennis Femení Solgironès

Final
- Champions: (Australia) Arina Rodionova (Australia) Storm Sanders
- Runners-up: (Hungary) Dalma Gálfi (Spain) Georgina García Pérez
- Score: 6–4, 6–4

Events
Singles	Doubles
← 2018 ·	Torneig Internacional de Tennis Femení Solgironès	· 2021 →

Jamie Loeb and Ana Sofía Sánchez were the defending champions, but both players chose not to participate.

Australian-duo Arina Rodionova and Storm Sanders won the title, defeating Dalma Gálfi and Georgina García Pérez in the final, 6–4, 6–4.

== Seeds ==
1. (Australia) Zoe Hives / (Belgium) Yanina Wickmayer (quarterfinals)
2. (Brazil) Laura Pigossi / (Netherlands) Rosalie van der Hoek (semifinals)
3. (Hungary) Dalma Gálfi / (Spain) Georgina García Pérez (final)
4. (Uzbekistan) Akgul Amanmuradova / (Georgia (country)) Ekaterine Gorgodze (first round)

== Draw ==
=== Key ===
- Q = Qualifier
- WC = Wild card
- LL = Lucky loser
- Alt = Alternate
- SE = Special exempt
- PR = Protected ranking
- ITF = ITF entry
- JE = Junior exempt
- w/o = Walkover
- r = Retired
- d = Defaulted
- SR = Special ranking

=== Draw ===
First round
(Australia) Ar Rodionova (Australia) S Sanders	6	6
WC	(Spain) C Hoste Ferrer (Spain) E López Alcaraz	1	0
4	(Uzbekistan) A Amanmuradova (Georgia (country)) E Gorgodze	6	5	[4]
(Spain) I Burillo Escorihuela (Spain) A Lázaro García	1	7	[10]
(Spain) A Bolsova (China) Xiy Wang	2	6	[11]
(Argentina) N Podoroska (Mexico) R Zarazúa	6	2	[9]
(Spain) E Guerrero Álvarez (Spain) G Maristany	6	6
(Spain) P Badosa Gibert (Serbia) O Danilović	2	4
WC	(Spain) N Ayala Serra (Spain) C Mayorova Bakhtina	3	2
3	(Hungary) D Gálfi (Spain) G García Pérez	6	6
(Russia) S Afifi (Spain) L Barona	2	3
WC	(Spain) A Ferrer Rodríguez (Spain) M Pages Mere	6	6
(Brazil) G Cé (Venezuela) A Gámiz	4	6	[5]
2	(Brazil) L Pigossi (Netherlands) R van der Hoek	6	4	[10]

Quarterfinals
1	(Australia) Z Hives (Belgium) Y Wickmayer	2	6	[6]
(Australia) Ar Rodionova (Australia) S Sanders	6	3	[10]
(Spain) I Burillo Escorihuela (Spain) A Lázaro García	4	2
(Spain) A Bolsova (China) Xiy Wang	6	6
(Spain) E Guerrero Álvarez (Spain) G Maristany	6	3	[8]
3	(Hungary) D Gálfi (Spain) G García Pérez	4	6	[10]
WC	(Spain) A Ferrer Rodríguez (Spain) M Pages Mere	3	1
2	(Brazil) L Pigossi (Netherlands) R van der Hoek	6	6

Semifinals
(Australia) Ar Rodionova (Australia) S Sanders	6	4	[10]
(Spain) A Bolsova (China) Xiy Wang	1	6	[6]
3	(Hungary) D Gálfi (Spain) G García Pérez	7	6
2	(Brazil) L Pigossi (Netherlands) R van der Hoek	5	0

Final
(Australia) Ar Rodionova (Australia) S Sanders	6	6
3	(Hungary) D Gálfi (Spain) G García Pérez	4	4
