= 2021 Solgironès Open Catalunya – Doubles =

Doubles
- 2021 Solgironès Open Catalunya

Final
- Champions: (Russia) Valentina Ivakhnenko (Romania) Andreea Prisăcariu
- Runners-up: (Germany) Mona Barthel (Luxembourg) Mandy Minella
- Score: 6–3, 6–1

Events
Singles	Doubles
← 2019 ·	Solgironès Open Catalunya	· 2022 →

Arina Rodionova and Storm Sanders were the defending champions having won the previous edition in 2019, however both players chose not to participate.

Valentina Ivakhnenko and Andreea Prisăcariu won the title, defeating Mona Barthel and Mandy Minella in the final, 6–3, 6–1.

== Seeds ==
1. (Slovakia) Viktória Kužmová / (Netherlands) Arantxa Rus (semifinals)
2. (Belarus) Lidziya Marozava / (Romania) Andreea Mitu (quarterfinals)
3. (Germany) Mona Barthel / (Luxembourg) Mandy Minella (final)
4. (Russia) Natela Dzalamidze / (Russia) Sofya Lansere (first round)

== Draw ==
=== Key ===
- Q = Qualifier
- WC = Wild card
- LL = Lucky loser
- Alt = Alternate
- SE = Special exempt
- PR = Protected ranking
- ITF = ITF entry
- JE = Junior exempt
- w/o = Walkover
- r = Retired
- d = Defaulted
- SR = Special ranking

=== Draw ===
First round
(Spain) A Mintegi del Olmo (Russia) O Selekhmeteva	3	5
(India) R Bhatia (South Korea) N-l Han	6	7
3	(Germany) M Barthel (Luxembourg) M Minella	6	6
(Poland) P Kania-Choduń (Serbia) N Kostić	1	1
(Italy) C Ferrando (Canada) R Marino	6	6^{4}	[11]
(Italy) F Di Sarra (Italy) C Rosatello	0	7^{7}	[9]
(Spain) A Briones Ginesta (India) A Kannan	5	4
(United Kingdom) E Webley-Smith (China) X You	7	6
(Russia) V Ivakhnenko (Romania) A Prisăcariu	5	6	[10]
4	(Russia) N Dzalamidze (Russia) S Lansere	7	2	[8]
(Spain) M Bassols Ribera (Spain) M Custic	4	6	[10]
(Netherlands) R Hogenkamp (Netherlands) S Lamens	6	4	[8]

Quarterfinals
1	(Slovakia) V Kužmová (Netherlands) A Rus	6	7^{10}
(India) R Bhatia (South Korea) N-l Han	3	6^{8}
3	(Germany) M Barthel (Luxembourg) M Minella	4	6	[10]
(Italy) C Ferrando (Canada) R Marino	6	1	[8]
(United Kingdom) E Webley-Smith (China) X You	0	3
(Russia) V Ivakhnenko (Romania) A Prisăcariu	6	6
(Spain) M Bassols Ribera (Spain) M Custic	6	6
2	(Belarus) L Marozava (Romania) A Mitu	4	4

Semifinals
1	(Slovakia) V Kužmová (Netherlands) A Rus	6	4	[7]
3	(Germany) M Barthel (Luxembourg) M Minella	4	6	[10]
(Russia) V Ivakhnenko (Romania) A Prisăcariu	6	2	[10]
(Spain) M Bassols Ribera (Spain) M Custic	3	6	[7]

Final
3	(Germany) M Barthel (Luxembourg) M Minella	3	1
(Russia) V Ivakhnenko (Romania) A Prisăcariu	6	6
