= 2024 Mutua Madrid Open – Women's doubles =

Women's doubles
- 2024 Mutua Madrid Open

Final
- Champions: (Spain) Cristina Bucșa (Spain) Sara Sorribes Tormo
- Runners-up: (Czech Republic) Barbora Krejčíková (Germany) Laura Siegemund
- Score: 6–0, 6–2

Details
- Draw: 32
- Seeds: 8

Events
Singles	men	women
Doubles	men	women
← 2023 ·	Mutua Madrid Open	· 2025 →

Cristina Bucșa and Sara Sorribes Tormo defeated Barbora Krejčíková and Laura Siegemund in the final, 6–0, 6–2, winning the women's doubles tennis title at the 2024 Madrid Open. It was the first WTA 1000 doubles title for Bucșa and second for Sorribes Tormo, and Bucșa's second and Sorribes Tormo's third career WTA Tour doubles title. They became the first all-Spanish pair to win the tournament.

Victoria Azarenka and Beatriz Haddad Maia were the reigning champions, but Azarenka chose not to participate this year. Haddad Maia partnered Ingrid Martins, but lost in the first round to Bucșa and Sorribes Tormo.

== Seeds ==
1. (Chinese Taipei) Hsieh Su-wei / (Belgium) Elise Mertens (semifinals)
2. (United States) Nicole Melichar-Martinez / (Australia) Ellen Perez (first round)
3. (Netherlands) Demi Schuurs / (Brazil) Luisa Stefani (second round)
4. (United States) Coco Gauff / (United States) Taylor Townsend (quarterfinals)
5. (Ukraine) Lyudmyla Kichenok / (Latvia) Jeļena Ostapenko (quarterfinals)
6. (Czech Republic) Barbora Krejčíková / (Germany) Laura Siegemund (final)
7. (United States) Caroline Dolehide / (United States) Desirae Krawczyk (quarterfinals)
8. (Spain) Cristina Bucșa / (Spain) Sara Sorribes Tormo (champions)

== Draw ==
=== Key ===
- Q = Qualifier
- WC = Wild card
- LL = Lucky loser
- Alt = Alternate
- ITF = ITF entry
- PR = Protected ranking
- SR = Special ranking
- SE = Special exempt
- JE = Junior exempt
- JR = Junior Accelerator Programme entrant
- CO = College Accelerator Programme entrant
- NG = Next Gen Accelerator Program entrant
- w/o = Walkover
- r = Retired
- d = Defaulted

=== Finals ===
Semifinals
1	(Chinese Taipei) Hsieh Su-wei (Belgium) Elise Mertens	3	5
6	(Czech Republic) Barbora Krejčíková (Germany) Laura Siegemund	6	7
8	(Spain) Cristina Bucșa (Spain) Sara Sorribes Tormo	6	7^{7}
Anastasia Pavlyuchenkova; Anastasia Potapova	4	6^{1}

Final
6	(Czech Republic) Barbora Krejčíková (Germany) Laura Siegemund	0	2
8	(Spain) Cristina Bucșa (Spain) Sara Sorribes Tormo	6	6

=== Top half ===
First round
1	(Chinese Taipei) S-w Hsieh (Belgium) E Mertens	2	6	[10]
(United States) A Muhammad (Indonesia) A Sutjiadi	6	4	[2]
(Ukraine) A Kalinina (Ukraine) D Yastremska	2	3
(United Kingdom) H Watson (China) Y Xu	6	6
(United Kingdom) K Boulter (Czech Republic) M Vondroušová	7^{9}	6
(Japan) E Hozumi (Japan) M Ninomiya	6^{7}	0
Alt	(Estonia) I Neel (Czech Republic) L Nosková	1	5
5	(Ukraine) L Kichenok (Latvia) J Ostapenko	6	7
4/WC	(United States) C Gauff (United States) T Townsend	6	3	[10]
(Hungary) A Bondár (Slovakia) T Mihalíková	3	6	[7]
(United States) A Krueger (New Zealand) E Routliffe	6^{5}	7	[9]
(United States) S Kenin (United States) B Mattek-Sands	7^{7}	5	[11]
(Italy) S Errani (Italy) J Paolini	5	4
M Andreeva; V Zvonareva	7	6
WC	(Spain) J Bouzas Maneiro (Andorra) V Jiménez Kasintseva	1	1
6	(Czech Republic) B Krejčíková (Germany) L Siegemund	6	6

Second round
1	(Chinese Taipei) S-w Hsieh (Belgium) E Mertens	6	6
(United Kingdom) H Watson (China) Y Xu	2	4
(United Kingdom) K Boulter (Czech Republic) M Vondroušová	3	6^{6}
5	(Ukraine) L Kichenok (Latvia) J Ostapenko	6	7^{8}
4/WC	(United States) C Gauff (United States) T Townsend	6	4	[10]
(United States) S Kenin (United States) B Mattek-Sands	2	6	[8]
M Andreeva; V Zvonareva	4	2
6	(Czech Republic) B Krejčíková (Germany) L Siegemund	6	6

Quarterfinals
1	(Chinese Taipei) S-w Hsieh (Belgium) E Mertens	6^{0}	6	[10]
5	(Ukraine) L Kichenok (Latvia) J Ostapenko	7^{7}	2	[7]
4/WC	(United States) C Gauff (United States) T Townsend	4	4
6	(Czech Republic) B Krejčíková (Germany) L Siegemund	6	6

Semifinals
1	(Chinese Taipei) S-w Hsieh (Belgium) E Mertens	3	5
6	(Czech Republic) B Krejčíková (Germany) L Siegemund	6	7

=== Bottom half ===
First round
8	(Spain) C Bucșa (Spain) S Sorribes Tormo	6	1	[10]
(Brazil) B Haddad Maia (Brazil) I Martins	4	6	[8]
(Chinese Taipei) H-c Chan; V Kudermetova	7	6
(China) H Guo (China) X Jiang	5	3
PR	(China) Xin Wang (China) S Zheng	6	6
(Romania) M Niculescu (United States) A Parks	1	3
(Poland) M Linette (China) S Zhang	1	2
3	(Netherlands) D Schuurs (Brazil) L Stefani	6	6
7	(United States) C Dolehide (United States) D Krawczyk	6	6
WC	(Croatia) D Vekić; E Vesnina	2	1
(Italy) L Bronzetti; L Samsonova	7	7^{8}
(Japan) S Aoyama (Hungary) T Babos	5	6^{6}
(Mexico) G Olmos; A Panova	7^{7}	4	[7]
(Japan) M Kato (Ukraine) N Kichenok	6^{5}	6	[10]
A Pavlyuchenkova; A Potapova	7	6
2	(United States) N Melichar-Martinez (Australia) E Perez	5	2

Second round
8	(Spain) C Bucșa (Spain) S Sorribes Tormo	7^{8}	6
(Chinese Taipei) H-c Chan; V Kudermetova	6^{6}	1
PR	(China) Xin Wang (China) S Zheng	7^{7}	2	[10]
3	(Netherlands) D Schuurs (Brazil) L Stefani	6^{4}	6	[5]
7	(United States) C Dolehide (United States) D Krawczyk	6	6^{3}	[10]
(Italy) L Bronzetti; L Samsonova	3	7^{7}	[8]
(Japan) M Kato (Ukraine) N Kichenok	4	1
A Pavlyuchenkova; A Potapova	6	6

Quarterfinals
8	(Spain) C Bucșa (Spain) S Sorribes Tormo	7	3	[10]
PR	(China) Xin Wang (China) S Zheng	5	6	[5]
7	(United States) C Dolehide (United States) D Krawczyk	3	6	[3]
A Pavlyuchenkova; A Potapova	6	3	[10]

Semifinals
8	(Spain) C Bucșa (Spain) S Sorribes Tormo	6	7^{7}
A Pavlyuchenkova; A Potapova	4	6^{1}

== Seeded teams ==
The following are the seeded teams. Seedings are based on WTA rankings as of 15 April 2024.

Country	Player	Country	Player	Rank	Seed
TPE	Hsieh Su-wei	BEL	Elise Mertens	3	1
USA	Nicole Melichar-Martinez	AUS	Ellen Perez	15	2
NED	Demi Schuurs	BRA	Luisa Stefani	21	3
USA	Coco Gauff	USA	Taylor Townsend	29	4
UKR	Lyudmyla Kichenok	LAT	Jeļena Ostapenko	37	5
CZE	Barbora Krejčiková	GER	Laura Siegemund	39	6
USA	Caroline Dolehide	USA	Desirae Krawczyk	45	7
ESP	Cristina Bucșa	ESP	Sara Sorribes Tormo	64	8

== Other entry information ==
=== Wildcards ===
- (Spain) Jéssica Bouzas Maneiro / (Andorra) Victoria Jiménez Kasintseva
- (United States) Coco Gauff / (United States) Taylor Townsend
- (Croatia) Donna Vekić / Elena Vesnina

=== Protected ranking ===
- (China) Wang Xinyu / (China) Zheng Saisai

=== Alternates ===
- (Estonia) Ingrid Neel / (Czech Republic) Linda Nosková

=== Withdrawals ===
- (Canada) Leylah Fernandez / (Netherlands) Arantxa Rus → replaced by (Estonia) Ingrid Neel / (Czech Republic) Linda Nosková
