= 2022 Torneig Internacional de Tennis Femení Solgironès – Doubles =

Doubles
- 2022 Torneig Internacional de Tennis Femení Solgironès

Final
- Champions: (Andorra) Victoria Jiménez Kasintseva (Mexico) Renata Zarazúa
- Runners-up: (United Kingdom) Alicia Barnett (United Kingdom) Olivia Nicholls
- Score: 6–4, 2–6, [10–8]

Events
Singles	Doubles
← 2021 ·	Torneig Internacional de Tennis Femení Solgironès	· 2023 →

Valentina Ivakhnenko and Andreea Prisăcariu were the defending champions but Ivakhnenko chose not to participate. Prisăcariu partnered alongside Isabelle Haverlag but lost to Anastasia Dețiuc and Miriam Kolodziejová in the quarterfinals.

Victoria Jiménez Kasintseva and Renata Zarazúa won the title, defeating Alicia Barnett and Olivia Nicholls in the final, 6–4, 2–6, [10–8].

== Seeds ==
1. (United Kingdom) Alicia Barnett / (United Kingdom) Olivia Nicholls (final)
2. (United States) Jamie Loeb / (United States) Asia Muhammad (quarterfinals)
3. (Spain) Aliona Bolsova / (Spain) Rebeka Masarova (semifinals, withdrew)
4. (Czech Republic) Anastasia Dețiuc / (Czech Republic) Miriam Kolodziejová (semifinals)

== Draw ==
=== Key ===
- Q = Qualifier
- WC = Wild card
- LL = Lucky loser
- Alt = Alternate
- SE = Special exempt
- PR = Protected ranking
- ITF = ITF entry
- JE = Junior exempt
- w/o = Walkover
- r = Retired
- d = Defaulted
- SR = Special ranking

=== Draw ===
First round
1	(United Kingdom) A Barnett (United Kingdom) O Nicholls	6	7^{7}
(Spain) I Burillo Escorihuela (Spain) C Cerviño Ruiz	3	6^{5}
(Uzbekistan) A Amanmuradova (Spain) M Bassols Ribera	7	7
O Selekhmeteva (Latvia) D Vismane	5	5
4	(Czech Republic) A Dețiuc (Czech Republic) M Kolodziejová	6	6
(Chile) B Gatica (Brazil) R Pereira	4	4
(Netherlands) I Haverlag (Romania) A Prisăcariu	6	6
WC	(India) A Kannan (Argentina) S Sierra	2	4
(United States) G Min (Mexico) M Zacarías	6	6
A Kubareva (Netherlands) A Rus	1	2
WC	(Spain) Y Cavallé Reimers (Spain) L Romero Gormaz	3	5
3	(Spain) A Bolsova (Spain) R Masarova	6	7
(Andorra) V Jiménez Kasintseva (Mexico) R Zarazúa	6	6
(Australia) O Gadecki (Israel) L Glushko	4	4
WC	(Spain) J Bouzas Maneiro (Spain) G Maristany	2	6	[7]
2	(United States) J Loeb (United States) A Muhammad	6	2	[10]

Quarterfinals
1	(United Kingdom) A Barnett (United Kingdom) O Nicholls	6	6
(Uzbekistan) A Amanmuradova (Spain) M Bassols Ribera	2	0
4	(Czech Republic) A Dețiuc (Czech Republic) M Kolodziejová	6^{3}	6	[10]
(Netherlands) I Haverlag (Romania) A Prisăcariu	7^{7}	2	[6]
(United States) G Min (Mexico) M Zacarías	2	3
3	(Spain) A Bolsova (Spain) R Masarova	6	6
(Andorra) V Jiménez Kasintseva (Mexico) R Zarazúa	7	6
2	(United States) J Loeb (United States) A Muhammad	5	1

Semifinals
1	(United Kingdom) A Barnett (United Kingdom) O Nicholls	6	6
4	(Czech Republic) A Dețiuc (Czech Republic) M Kolodziejová	3	2
3	(Spain) A Bolsova (Spain) R Masarova
(Andorra) V Jiménez Kasintseva (Mexico) R Zarazúa	w/o

Final
1	(United Kingdom) A Barnett (United Kingdom) O Nicholls	4	6	[8]
(Andorra) V Jiménez Kasintseva (Mexico) R Zarazúa	6	2	[10]
