= 2019 Torneig Internacional de Tennis Femení Solgironès =

- Date: 13–19 May 2019
- Edition: 4th
- Category: ITF Women's World Tennis Tour
- Prize money: $60,000+H
- Surface: Clay
- Location: La Bisbal d'Empordà, Spain

Champions

Singles
- (China) Wang Xiyu

Doubles
- (Australia) Arina Rodionova / (Australia) Storm Sanders
← 2018 ·	Torneig Internacional de Tennis Femení Solgironès	· 2021 →

The 2019 Torneig Internacional de Tennis Femení Solgironès was a professional tennis tournament played on outdoor clay courts. It was the fourth edition of the tournament which was part of the 2019 ITF Women's World Tennis Tour. It took place in La Bisbal d'Empordà, Spain between 13 and 19 May 2019.

== Singles main-draw entrants ==
=== Seeds ===
Country	Player	Rank^{1}	Seed
LUX	Mandy Minella	100	1
SRB	Ivana Jorović	104	2
SUI	Stefanie Vögele	113	3
CZE	Marie Bouzková	117	4
SRB	Olga Danilović	120	5
ESP	Paula Badosa Gibert	133	6
ISR	Julia Glushko	134	7
ESP	Aliona Bolsova	141	8

- ^{1} Rankings are as of 6 May 2019.

=== Other entrants ===
The following players received wildcards into the singles main draw:

- (Spain) Eva Guerrero Álvarez
- (Spain) Claudia Hoste Ferrer
- (Germany) Sabine Lisicki
- (Mexico) Renata Zarazúa

The following players received entry by special exempts:

- (Argentina) Nadia Podoroska
- (Chile) Daniela Seguel

The following players received entry from the qualifying draw:

- (United Kingdom) Naiktha Bains
- (Sweden) Mirjam Björklund
- (Hungary) Dalma Gálfi
- (United Kingdom) Francesca Jones
- (Ukraine) Marta Kostyuk
- (Spain) Rosa Vicens Mas

== Champions ==
=== Singles ===
- (China) Wang Xiyu def. (Hungary) Dalma Gálfi, 4–6, 6–3, 6–2

=== Doubles ===
- (Australia) Arina Rodionova / (Australia) Storm Sanders def. (Hungary) Dalma Gálfi / (Spain) Georgina García Pérez, 6–4, 6–4
