= 2024 Mutua Madrid Open – Women's singles =

Women's singles
- 2024 Mutua Madrid Open

Final
- Champion: (Poland) Iga Świątek
- Runner-up: Aryna Sabalenka
- Score: 7–5, 4–6, 7–6^{(9–7)}

Details
- Draw: 96 (12Q, 8WC)
- Seeds: 32

Events
Singles	men	women
Doubles	men	women
← 2023 ·	Madrid Open	· 2025 →

Iga Świątek defeated defending champion Aryna Sabalenka in a rematch of the previous year's final, 7–5, 4–6, 7–6^{(9–7)} to win the women's singles tennis title at the 2024 Madrid Open. She saved three championship points en route to her ninth WTA 1000 and 20th career WTA Tour title.

Sabalenka and Świątek became the first pair of players to contest consecutive finals at the tournament since the inception of the women's event in 2009.

== Seeds ==
All seeds received a bye into the second round.

1. (Poland) Iga Świątek (champion)
2. Aryna Sabalenka (final)
3. (United States) Coco Gauff (fourth round)
4. (Kazakhstan) Elena Rybakina (semifinals)
5. (Greece) Maria Sakkari (fourth round)
6. (China) Zheng Qinwen (second round, retired)
7. (Czech Republic) Markéta Vondroušová (third round)
8. (Tunisia) Ons Jabeur (quarterfinals)
9. (Latvia) Jeļena Ostapenko (fourth round)
10. Daria Kasatkina (fourth round)
11. (Brazil) Beatriz Haddad Maia (quarterfinals)
12. (Italy) Jasmine Paolini (fourth round)
13. (United States) Danielle Collins (fourth round)
14. Ekaterina Alexandrova (second round)
15. Liudmila Samsonova (third round)
16. (Ukraine) Elina Svitolina (second round)
17. Veronika Kudermetova (second round)
18. (United States) Madison Keys (semifinals)
19. (United States) Emma Navarro (third round)
20. Anastasia Pavlyuchenkova (third round)
21. (France) Caroline Garcia (third round)
22. (Czech Republic) Barbora Krejčíková (second round)
23. Victoria Azarenka (third round)
24. Anna Kalinskaya (second round)
25. (Ukraine) Marta Kostyuk (second round)
26. (United Kingdom) Katie Boulter (second round)
27. (Romania) Sorana Cîrstea (third round)
28. (Belgium) Elise Mertens (second round)
29. (Czech Republic) Linda Nosková (second round)
30. (Ukraine) Anhelina Kalinina (second round)
31. (Ukraine) Dayana Yastremska (third round)
32. (Canada) Leylah Fernandez (third round)

Click on the seed number of a player to go to their draw section.

== Draw ==
=== Key ===
- Q = Qualifier
- WC = Wild card
- LL = Lucky loser
- Alt = Alternate
- ITF = ITF entry
- PR = Protected ranking
- SR = Special ranking
- SE = Special exempt
- JE = Junior exempt
- JR = Junior Accelerator Programme entrant
- CO = College Accelerator Programme entrant
- NG = Next Gen Accelerator Program entrant
- w/o = Walkover
- r = Retired
- d = Defaulted

=== Finals ===
Quarterfinals
1	(Poland) Iga Świątek	4	6	6
11	(Brazil) Beatriz Haddad Maia	6	0	2
18	(United States) Madison Keys	0	7	6
8	(Tunisia) Ons Jabeur	6	5	1
(Kazakhstan) Yulia Putintseva	6	6^{4}	5
4	(Kazakhstan) Elena Rybakina	4	7^{7}	7
Mirra Andreeva	1	4
2	Aryna Sabalenka	6	6

Semifinals
1	(Poland) Iga Świątek	6	6
18	(United States) Madison Keys	1	3
4	(Kazakhstan) Elena Rybakina	6	5	6^{5}
2	Aryna Sabalenka	1	7	7^{7}

Final
1	(Poland) Iga Świątek	7	4	7^{9}
2	Aryna Sabalenka	5	6	6^{7}

=== Top half ===
==== Section 1 ====
First round
(China) Xiy Wang	6^{5}	7^{7}	6
(Romania) A Bogdan	7^{7}	6^{4}	2
WC	(Philippines) A Eala	2	6	6
(Ukraine) L Tsurenko	6	4	4
(Germany) T Maria	6^{4}	6	7^{7}
(United States) P Stearns	7^{7}	2	6^{5}
(Spain) S Sorribes Tormo	7	6
Q	(United States) B Pera	5	2

Second round
1	(Poland) I Świątek	6	6
(China) Xiy Wang	1	4
WC	(Philippines) A Eala	3	7^{8}	4
27	(Romania) S Cîrstea	6	6^{6}	6
23	V Azarenka	6	6
(Germany) T Maria	3	1
(Spain) S Sorribes Tormo	6	7
16	(Ukraine) E Svitolina	3	5

Third round
1	(Poland) I Świątek	6	6
27	(Romania) S Cîrstea	1	1
23	V Azarenka	6^{0}	3
(Spain) S Sorribes Tormo	7^{7}	6

Fourth round
1	(Poland) I Świątek	6	6
(Spain) S Sorribes Tormo	1	0

==== Section 2 ====
First round
Q	(Italy) S Errani	3	7	7
WC	(Denmark) C Wozniacki	6	5	5
Alt	(Argentina) N Podoroska	6	7^{7}
(Czech Republic) K Siniaková	2	6^{2}
(United States) S Stephens	6	5	6
(Italy) M Trevisan	3	7	4
(Croatia) D Vekić	6	6
Q	(Germany) L Siegemund	1	2

Second round
11	(Brazil) B Haddad Maia	6	6
Q	(Italy) S Errani	3	2
Alt	(Argentina) N Podoroska	2	1
19	(United States) E Navarro	6	6
28	(Belgium) E Mertens	6	3	1
(United States) S Stephens	3	6	6
(Croatia) D Vekić	3	2
5	(Greece) M Sakkari	6	6

Third round
11	(Brazil) B Haddad Maia	6	6
19	(United States) E Navarro	4	4
(United States) S Stephens	1	3
5	(Greece) M Sakkari	6	6

Fourth round
11	(Brazil) B Haddad Maia	6	6
5	(Greece) M Sakkari	4	4

==== Section 3 ====
First round
WC	(Czech Republic) B Fruhvirtová	5	3
(Netherlands) A Rus	7	6
Q	(Colombia) E Arango	1	6	7^{7}
WC	(United States) A Anisimova	6	4	6^{2}
PR	(Romania) I-C Begu	6	7^{7}
WC	(Czech Republic) L Fruhvirtová	4	6^{0}
PR	(Japan) N Osaka	6	6
LL	(Belgium) G Minnen	4	1

Second round
3	(United States) C Gauff	6	6
(Netherlands) A Rus	0	0
Q	(Colombia) E Arango	6	5	4
31	(Ukraine) D Yastremska	0	7	6
18	(United States) M Keys	7^{7}	7^{8}
PR	(Romania) I-C Begu	6^{3}	6^{6}
PR	(Japan) N Osaka	2	6	5
15	L Samsonova	6	4	7

Third round
3	(United States) C Gauff	6	6
31	(Ukraine) D Yastremska	4	1
18	(United States) M Keys	6	6
15	L Samsonova	2	3

Fourth round
3	(United States) C Gauff	6^{4}	6	4
18	(United States) M Keys	7^{7}	4	6

==== Section 4 ====
First round
Q	(Spain) J Bouzas Maneiro	2	6	6
PR	(Spain) P Badosa	6	3	3
WC	(United Kingdom) E Raducanu	2	2
Q	(Argentina) ML Carlé	6	6
D Shnaider	5	4
A Potapova	7	6
(United States) S Kenin	3	4
(Slovakia) AK Schmiedlová	6	6

Second round
9	(Latvia) J Ostapenko	6	6
Q	(Spain) J Bouzas Maneiro	3	1
Q	(Argentina) ML Carlé	6	6
17	V Kudermetova	4	4
32	(Canada) L Fernandez	7	6
A Potapova	5	3
(Slovakia) AK Schmiedlová	4	7	3
8	(Tunisia) O Jabeur	6	5	6

Third round
9	(Latvia) J Ostapenko	6	6
Q	(Argentina) ML Carlé	3	3
32	(Canada) L Fernandez	5	6	4
8	(Tunisia) O Jabeur	7	2	6

Fourth round
9	(Latvia) J Ostapenko	0	4
8	(Tunisia) O Jabeur	6	6

=== Bottom half ===
==== Section 5 ====
First round
(Kazakhstan) Y Putintseva	6	6
(China) Y Yuan	2	4
LL	(China) Z Bai	3	3
(United States) C Dolehide	6	6
Q	(United States) H Baptiste	4	6^{5}
LL	(Australia) D Saville	6	7^{7}
Q	(United Kingdom) H Dart	4	4
(Spain) C Bucșa	6	6

Second round
6	(China) Q Zheng	5	0^{r}
(Kazakhstan) Y Putintseva	7	2
(United States) C Dolehide	6^{6}	6	6
30	(Ukraine) A Kalinina	7^{8}	2	3
20	A Pavlyuchenkova	6	6
LL	(Australia) D Saville	1	4
(Spain) C Bucșa	7	6^{5}	3
10	D Kasatkina	5	7^{7}	6

Third round
(Kazakhstan) Y Putintseva	6	6
(United States) C Dolehide	2	2
20	A Pavlyuchenkova	6^{5}	5
10	D Kasatkina	7^{7}	7

Fourth round
(Kazakhstan) Y Putintseva	3	6	6
10	D Kasatkina	6	2	2

==== Section 6 ====
First round
(Japan) N Hibino	4	4
(United States) A Krueger	6	6
Q	(Czech Republic) S Bejlek	4	6	6
A Blinkova	6	3	3
PR	(United States) L Davis	6	6^{4}	4
(Egypt) M Sherif	4	7^{7}	6
(Italy) L Bronzetti	6	6
Q	(France) V Gracheva	3	3

Second round
14	E Alexandrova	3	3
(United States) A Krueger	6	6
Q	(Czech Republic) S Bejlek	6	6
24	A Kalinskaya	1	4
25	(Ukraine) M Kostyuk	2	5
(Egypt) M Sherif	6	7
(Italy) L Bronzetti	4	3
4	(Kazakhstan) E Rybakina	6	6

Third round
(United States) A Krueger	3	1
Q	(Czech Republic) S Bejlek	6	6
(Egypt) M Sherif	1	4
4	(Kazakhstan) E Rybakina	6	6

Fourth round
Q	(Czech Republic) S Bejlek	1	3
4	(Kazakhstan) E Rybakina	6	6

==== Section 7 ====
First round
PR	(China) S Zhang	3	2
PR	(United States) S Rogers	6	6
M Andreeva	4	6	7
(United States) T Townsend	6	1	5
(China) Xin Wang	5	7	6
(Bulgaria) V Tomova	7	5	4
(China) L Zhu	4	3
WC	(Andorra) V Jiménez Kasintseva	6	6

Second round
7	(Czech Republic) M Vondroušová	6	6
PR	(United States) S Rogers	1	3
M Andreeva	4	6	6
29	(Czech Republic) L Nosková	6	3	3
21	(France) C Garcia	6	6
(China) Xin Wang	1	4
WC	(Andorra) V Jiménez Kasintseva	0	1
12	(Italy) J Paolini	6	6

Third round
7	(Czech Republic) M Vondroušová	5	1
M Andreeva	7	6
21	(France) C Garcia	3	2
12	(Italy) J Paolini	6	6

Fourth round
M Andreeva	7^{7}	6
12	(Italy) J Paolini	6^{2}	4

==== Section 8 ====
First round
(France) C Burel	6	6^{8}	4
Q	(Serbia) O Danilović	3	7^{10}	6
(Poland) M Fręch	5	2
Q	(Romania) J Cristian	7	6
WC	(United States) R Montgomery	6	6
E Avanesyan	2	2
(Poland) M Linette	3	6	6
(Italy) E Cocciaretto	6	4	4

Second round
13	(United States) D Collins	4	6	7^{10}
Q	(Serbia) O Danilović	6	4	6^{8}
Q	(Romania) J Cristian	2	6	6
22	(Czech Republic) B Krejčíková	6	0	2
26	(United Kingdom) K Boulter	6	3	4
WC	(United States) R Montgomery	1	6	6
(Poland) M Linette	4	6	3
2	A Sabalenka	6	3	6

Third round
13	(United States) D Collins	3	6	6
Q	(Romania) J Cristian	6	4	1
WC	(United States) R Montgomery	1	7^{7}	4
2	A Sabalenka	6	6^{5}	6

Fourth round
13	(United States) D Collins	6	4	3
2	A Sabalenka	4	6	6

== Championship match statistics ==
Category	(Poland) Świątek	Sabalenka
1st serve %	78/119 (66%)	68/118 (58%)
1st serve points won	52 of 78 = 67%	46 of 68 = 68%
2nd serve points won	21 of 41 = 51%	24 of 48 = 50%
Total service points won	73 of 119 = 61.34%	70 of 118 = 59.32%
Aces	2	4
Double faults	4	4
Winners	35	41
Unforced errors	34	36
Net points won	6 of 7 = 86%	9 of 14 = 64%
Break points converted	5 of 12 = 42%	5 of 13 = 38%
Return points won	48 of 118 = 41%	46 of 119 = 39%
Total points won	121	116

== Seeded players ==
The following are the seeded players. Seedings are based on WTA rankings as of 15 April 2024. Rankings and points before are as of 22 April 2024.

Seed	Rank	Player	Points before	Points defending	Points earned	Points after	Status
1	1	(Poland) Iga Świątek	10,560	650	1,000	10,910	Champion, defeated Aryna Sabalenka [2]
2	2	Aryna Sabalenka	7,848	1,000	650	7,498	Runner-up, lost to (Poland) Iga Świątek [1]
3	3	(United States) Coco Gauff	7,258	65	120	7,313	Fourth round lost to (United States) Madison Keys [18]
4	4	(Kazakhstan) Elena Rybakina	6,293	10	390	6,673	Semifinals lost to Aryna Sabalenka [2]
5	6	(Greece) Maria Sakkari	4,195	390	120	3,925	Fourth round lost to (Brazil) Beatriz Haddad Maia [11]
6	8	(China) Zheng Qinwen	4,000	65	10	3,945	Second round retired against (Kazakhstan) Yulia Putintseva
7	7	(Czech Republic) Markéta Vondroušová	4,090	65	65	4,090	Third round lost to Mirra Andreeva
8	9	(Tunisia) Ons Jabeur	3,533	0	215	3,748	Quarterfinals lost to (United States) Madison Keys [18]
9	10	(Latvia) Jeļena Ostapenko	3,438	65	120	3,493	Fourth round lost to (Tunisia) Ons Jabeur [8]
10	11	Daria Kasatkina	3,313	120	120	3,313	Fourth round lost to (Kazakhstan) Yulia Putintseva
11	14	(Brazil) Beatriz Haddad Maia	2,830	10	215	3,035	Quarterfinals lost to (Poland) Iga Świątek [1]
12	13	(Italy) Jasmine Paolini	2,938	10	120	3,048	Fourth round lost to Mirra Andreeva
13	15	(United States) Danielle Collins	2,639	0	120	2,759	Fourth round lost to Aryna Sabalenka [2]
14	16	Ekaterina Alexandrova	2,560	120	10	2,450	Second round lost to (United States) Ashlyn Krueger
15	17	Liudmila Samsonova	2,550	120	65	2,495	Third round lost to (United States) Madison Keys [18]
16	18	(Ukraine) Elina Svitolina	2,457	10+57	10+0	2,400	Second round lost to (Spain) Sara Sorribes Tormo
17	19	Veronika Kudermetova	2,383	390	10	2,003	Second round lost to (Argentina) María Lourdes Carlé [Q]
18	20	(United States) Madison Keys	2,298	0	390	2,688	Semifinals lost to (Poland) Iga Świątek [1]
19	23	(United States) Emma Navarro	2,158	(80)^{†}	65	2,143	Third round lost to (Brazil) Beatriz Haddad Maia [11]
20	22	Anastasia Pavlyuchenkova	2,161	35	65	2,191	Third round lost to Daria Kasatkina [10]
21	24	(France) Caroline Garcia	2,068	65	65	2,068	Third round lost to (Italy) Jasmine Paolini [12]
22	27	(Czech Republic) Barbora Krejčíková	1,942	120	10	1,832	Second round lost to (Romania) Jaqueline Cristian [Q]
23	26	Victoria Azarenka	1,969	10	65	2,024	Third round lost to (Spain) Sara Sorribes Tormo
24	25	Anna Kalinskaya	1,971	65	10	1,916	Second round lost to (Czech Republic) Sára Bejlek [Q]
25	21	(Ukraine) Marta Kostyuk	2,235	10	10	2,235	Second round lost to (Egypt) Mayar Sherif
26	28	(United Kingdom) Katie Boulter	1,802	(70)^{†}	10	1,742	Second round lost to (United States) Robin Montgomery [WC]
27	30	(Romania) Sorana Cîrstea	1,748	35+160	65+1	1,619	Third round lost to (Poland) Iga Świątek [1]
28	29	(Belgium) Elise Mertens	1,794	120	10	1,684	Second round lost to (United States) Sloane Stephens
29	31	(Czech Republic) Linda Nosková	1,674	0	10	1,684	Second round lost to Mirra Andreeva
30	32	(Ukraine) Anhelina Kalinina	1,666	10	10	1,666	Second round lost to (United States) Caroline Dolehide
31	34	(Ukraine) Dayana Yastremska	1,597	30+57	65+15	1,590	Third round lost to (United States) Coco Gauff [3]
32	35	(Canada) Leylah Fernandez	1,520	10	65	1,575	Third round lost to (Tunisia) Ons Jabeur [8]

† The player did not qualify for the main draw in 2023. She is defending points from an ITF tournament instead.

=== Withdrawn players ===
The following players would have been seeded, but withdrew before the tournament began.

Rank	Player	Points before	Points dropped	Points after	Withdrawal reason
5	(United States) Jessica Pegula	4,870	215	4,655	Injury
12	(Czech Republic) Karolína Muchová	2,965	35	2,930	Wrist surgery

== Other entry information ==
=== Wild cards ===
- (United States) Amanda Anisimova
- (Philippines) Alexandra Eala
- (Czech Republic) Brenda Fruhvirtová
- (Czech Republic) Linda Fruhvirtová
- (Andorra) Victoria Jiménez Kasintseva
- (United States) Robin Montgomery
- (United Kingdom) Emma Raducanu
- (Denmark) Caroline Wozniacki

=== Protected ranking ===
- (Spain) Paula Badosa
- (Romania) Irina-Camelia Begu
- (United States) Lauren Davis
- (Japan) Naomi Osaka
- (United States) Shelby Rogers
- (China) Zhang Shuai

=== Alternate ===
- (Argentina) Nadia Podoroska

=== Lucky losers ===
- (China) Bai Zhuoxuan
- (Belgium) Greet Minnen
- (Australia) Daria Saville

=== Withdrawals ===
- @ (United States) Amanda Anisimova → replaced by (Spain) Cristina Bucșa
- † (Switzerland) Belinda Bencic → replaced by (United States) Taylor Townsend
- ‡ (Czech Republic) Marie Bouzková → replaced by (Argentina) Nadia Podoroska
- † (Czech Republic) Petra Kvitová → replaced by (United States) Ashlyn Krueger
- § (Croatia) Petra Martić → replaced by (Belgium) Greet Minnen
- † (Czech Republic) Karolína Muchová → replaced by (Egypt) Mayar Sherif
- ‡ (France) Diane Parry → replaced by (Japan) Nao Hibino
- ‡ (United States) Jessica Pegula → replaced by (Bulgaria) Viktoriya Tomova
- § (Czech Republic) Karolína Plíšková → replaced by (Australia) Daria Saville
- § (China) Wang Yafan → replaced by (China) Bai Zhuoxuan

† – not included on entry list
‡ – withdrew from entry list
@ – withdrew from entry list (using special ranking) and received wildcard
§ – withdrew from main draw

== Qualifying ==
=== Seeds ===
1. (Colombia) Camila Osorio (first round)
2. (Argentina) Nadia Podoroska (moved to main draw)
3. (Belgium) Greet Minnen (qualifying competition, lucky loser)
4. (Romania) Jaqueline Cristian (qualified)
5. (France) Océane Dodin (first round)
6. (Spain) Rebeka Masarova (first round)
7. (United States) Bernarda Pera (qualified)
8. (Argentina) María Lourdes Carlé (qualified)
9. (Germany) Laura Siegemund (qualified)
10. (Denmark) Clara Tauson (first round, retired)
11. (United Kingdom) Harriet Dart (qualified)
12. (Belgium) Yanina Wickmayer (first round)
13. (Spain) Jéssica Bouzas Maneiro (qualified)
14. (China) Bai Zhuoxuan (qualifying competition, lucky loser)
15. (France) Varvara Gracheva (qualified)
16. (Australia) Daria Saville (qualifying competition, lucky loser)
17. Maria Timofeeva (qualifying competition)
18. Kamilla Rakhimova (first round)
19. (Mexico) Renata Zarazúa (qualifying competition)
20. (Italy) Sara Errani (qualified)
21. (United States) Katie Volynets (first round)
22. (United States) Hailey Baptiste (qualified)
23. (Hungary) Anna Bondár (first round)
24. (Germany) Jule Niemeier (qualifying competition)

=== Qualifiers ===
1. (Serbia) Olga Danilović
2. (France) Varvara Gracheva
3. (Colombia) Emiliana Arango
4. (Romania) Jaqueline Cristian
5. (Italy) Sara Errani
6. (Spain) Jéssica Bouzas Maneiro
7. (United States) Bernarda Pera
8. (Argentina) María Lourdes Carlé
9. (Germany) Laura Siegemund
10. (United States) Hailey Baptiste
11. (United Kingdom) Harriet Dart
12. (Czech Republic) Sára Bejlek

=== Lucky losers ===
1. (Belgium) Greet Minnen
2. (Australia) Daria Saville
3. (China) Bai Zhuoxuan

=== Qualifying draw ===
==== First qualifier ====
First round
1	(Colombia) Camila Osorio	3	5
(Serbia) Olga Danilović	6	7
(Spain) Nuria Párrizas Díaz	6^{9}	5
24	(Germany) Jule Niemeier	7^{11}	7

Qualifying competition
(Serbia) Olga Danilović	6	6
24	(Germany) Jule Niemeier	4	4

==== Second qualifier ====
First round
Alt	(France) Jessika Ponchet	4	2
(United States) Elizabeth Mandlik	6	6
WC	(Spain) Guiomar Maristany	2	3
15	(France) Varvara Gracheva	6	6

Qualifying competition
(United States) Elizabeth Mandlik	1	1
15	(France) Varvara Gracheva	6	6

==== Third qualifier ====
First round
3	(Belgium) Greet Minnen	3	6	6
(Latvia) Darja Semeņistaja	6	2	4
(Colombia) Emiliana Arango	6	6
18	Kamilla Rakhimova	4	1

Qualifying competition
3	(Belgium) Greet Minnen	6	6^{8}	1
(Colombia) Emiliana Arango	2	7^{10}	6

==== Fourth qualifier ====
First round
4	(Romania) Jaqueline Cristian	7^{7}	6
(United States) McCartney Kessler	6^{4}	4
Alt	Anastasia Zakharova	1	7	2
16	(Australia) Daria Saville	6	5	6

Qualifying competition
4	(Romania) Jaqueline Cristian	6	2	6
16	(Australia) Daria Saville	4	6	2

==== Fifth qualifier ====
First round
5	(France) Océane Dodin	3	1
WC	(Spain) Leyre Romero Gormaz	6	6
(Argentina) Julia Riera	6	0	2
20	(Italy) Sara Errani	2	6	6

Qualifying competition
WC	(Spain) Leyre Romero Gormaz	5	6	1
20	(Italy) Sara Errani	7	4	6

==== Sixth qualifier ====
First round
6	(Spain) Rebeka Masarova	4	6	1
(United States) Sachia Vickery	6	4	6
(United States) Claire Liu	2	6	4
13	(Spain) Jéssica Bouzas Maneiro	6	2	6

Qualifying competition
(United States) Sachia Vickery	6^{5}	2
13	(Spain) Jéssica Bouzas Maneiro	7^{7}	6

==== Seventh qualifier ====
First round
7	(United States) Bernarda Pera	6	6
(Brazil) Laura Pigossi	4	2
(United States) Alycia Parks	1	1
19	(Mexico) Renata Zarazúa	6	6

Qualifying competition
7	(United States) Bernarda Pera	6	6
19	(Mexico) Renata Zarazúa	3	2

==== Eighth qualifier ====
First round
8	(Argentina) María Lourdes Carlé	6	7
(Australia) Taylah Preston	2	5
(Australia) Astra Sharma	4	6	6
21	(United States) Katie Volynets	6	1	4

Qualifying competition
8	(Argentina) María Lourdes Carlé	6	7
(Australia) Astra Sharma	3	5

==== Ninth qualifier ====
First round
9	(Germany) Laura Siegemund	4	6	6
WC	(United States) Tyra Caterina Grant	6	2	2
WC	(Spain) Carlota Martínez Círez	6	6
23	(Hungary) Anna Bondár	3	2

Qualifying competition
9	(Germany) Laura Siegemund	6	6
(Spain) Carlota Martínez Círez	1	2

==== Tenth qualifier ====
First round
10	(Denmark) Clara Tauson	6^{6}	0^{r}
(Slovakia) Rebecca Šramková	7^{8}	0
WC	(Spain) Ariana Geerlings	6	1	2
22	(United States) Hailey Baptiste	2	6	6

Qualifying competition
(Slovakia) Rebecca Šramková	2	0
22	(United States) Hailey Baptiste	6	6

==== Eleventh qualifier ====
First round
11	(United Kingdom) Harriet Dart	0	6	7^{7}
Aliaksandra Sasnovich	6	3	6^{1}
(France) Fiona Ferro	5	6	2
17	Maria Timofeeva	7	3	6

Qualifying competition
11	(United Kingdom) Harriet Dart	4	6	7
17	Maria Timofeeva	6	3	5

==== Twelfth qualifier ====
First round
12	(Belgium) Yanina Wickmayer	1	4
(Czech Republic) Sára Bejlek	6	6
WC	(Spain) Irene Burillo Escorihuela	2	7^{7}	3
14	(China) Bai Zhuoxuan	6	6^{5}	6

Qualifying competition
(Czech Republic) Sára Bejlek	6	1	6
14	(China) Bai Zhuoxuan	4	6	3
