= Wang Xinyu =

Chinese tennis player (born 2001)

Wang Xinyu 王欣瑜
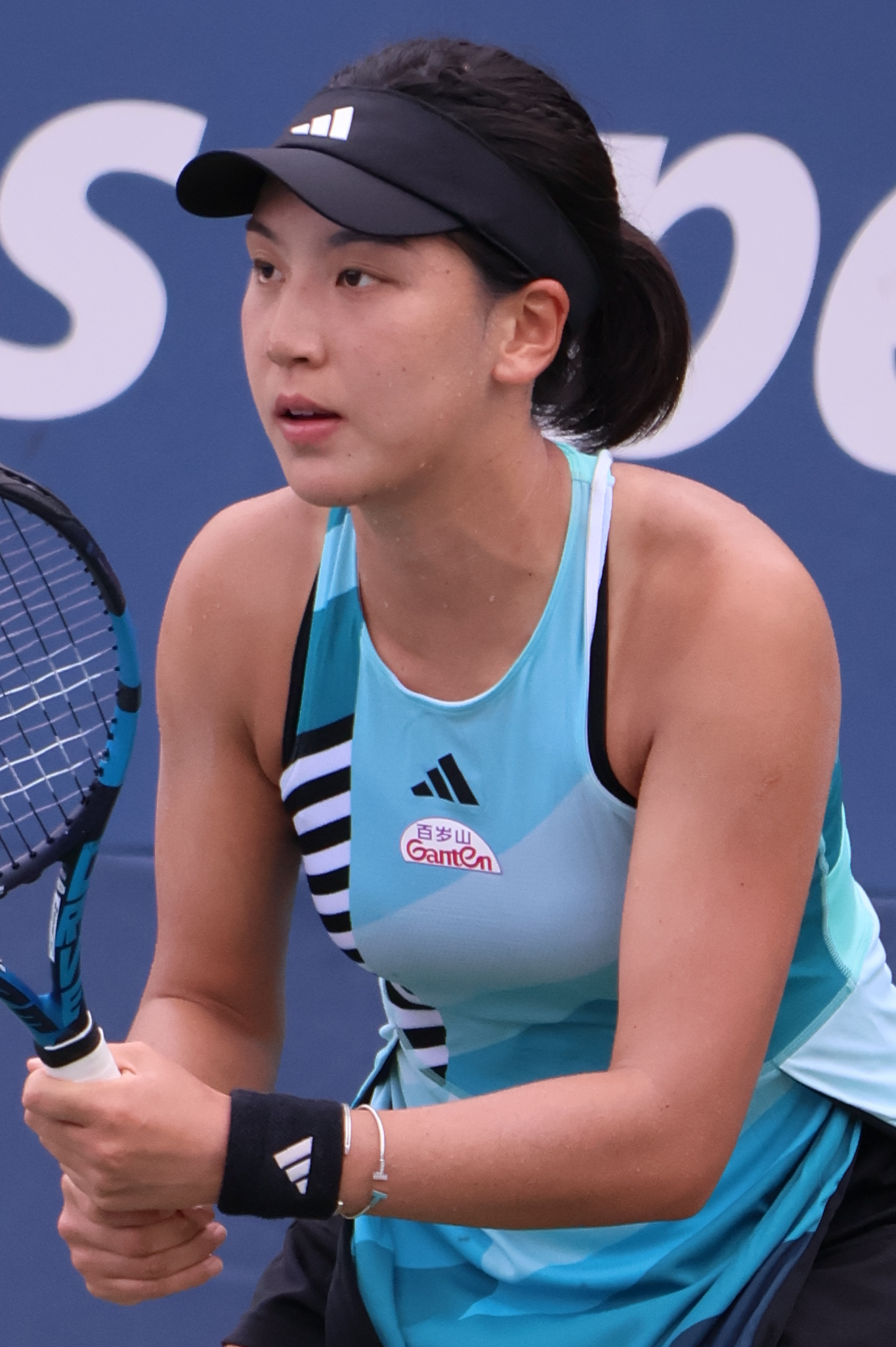
- Wang at the 2023 US Open
- Country (sports): China
- Residence: Shenzhen, Guangdong
- Born: 26 September 2001 (age 25) Shenzhen, Guangdong, China
- Height: 1.82 m (6 ft 0 in)
- Turned pro: 2018
- Coach: Goran Tošić (2025-)
- Prize money: US$ 5,975,457

Singles
- Career record: 277–202
- Career titles: 0 WTA, 7 ITF
- Highest ranking: No. 30 (23 February 2026)
- Current ranking: No. 40 (21 September 2026)

Grand Slam singles results
- Australian Open: 4R (2026)
- French Open: 3R (2023, 2024)
- Wimbledon: 4R (2024)
- US Open: 4R (2023)

Other tournaments
- Olympic Games: 2R (2024)

Doubles
- Career record: 102–70
- Career titles: 4
- Highest ranking: No. 16 (20 May 2024)
- Current ranking: No. 78 (21 September 2026)

Grand Slam doubles results
- Australian Open: 3R (2025)
- French Open: W (2023)
- Wimbledon: 3R (2026)
- US Open: SF (2023)

Other doubles tournaments
- Olympic Games: 1R (2024)

Other mixed doubles tournaments
- Olympic Games: F (2024)
Medal record
Women's tennis
Representing China
Olympic Games
Silver medal – second place	2024 Paris	Mixed
- Last updated on: 21 September 2026.

Wang Xinyu
- Chinese: 王欣瑜
Transcriptions
Standard Mandarin
- Hanyu Pinyin: Wáng Xīnyú
- Bopomofo: ㄨㄤˊ ㄒㄧㄣ ㄩˊ
- Gwoyeu Romatzyh: Wang Shinyu
- Wade–Giles: Wang^{2} Hsin^{1}yü^{2}
- Tongyong Pinyin: Wáng Sinyú
- Yale Romanization: Wáng Syīnyú
- MPS2: Wáng Shīn-yú
- IPA: [wǎŋ ɕín y̌]
Yue: Cantonese
- Yale Romanization: wòhng yān yùh
- Jyutping: wong4 jan1 jyu4

Wang Xinyu (Note: Chinese: 王欣瑜; pinyin: Wáng Xīnyú, pronounced [wǎŋ ɕín y̌]) (born 26 September 2001) is a Chinese professional tennis player. She reached a career-high singles ranking of world No. 30 on 23 February 2026, and a best doubles ranking of world No. 16 on 20 May 2024. Partnering with Hsieh Su-wei, she won the women's doubles title at the 2023 French Open. Wang also won a silver medal in mixed doubles, alongside Zhang Zhizhen at the 2024 Summer Olympics.

== Personal life ==
Wang was born in Shenzhen, Guangdong. Her father, Wang Peng (born in Hangzhou, Zhejiang), is a former head coach of the Shenzhen tennis team and the Chinese women's national tennis team, but resigned from the latter to concentrate on his daughter's tennis career. Her mother was a former player in the Zhejiang women's basketball team. Wang showed great enthusiasm for tennis from early childhood and, coached by her father, she started playing properly at the age of five.

== Career ==
=== 2018: Major debut and junior champion ===
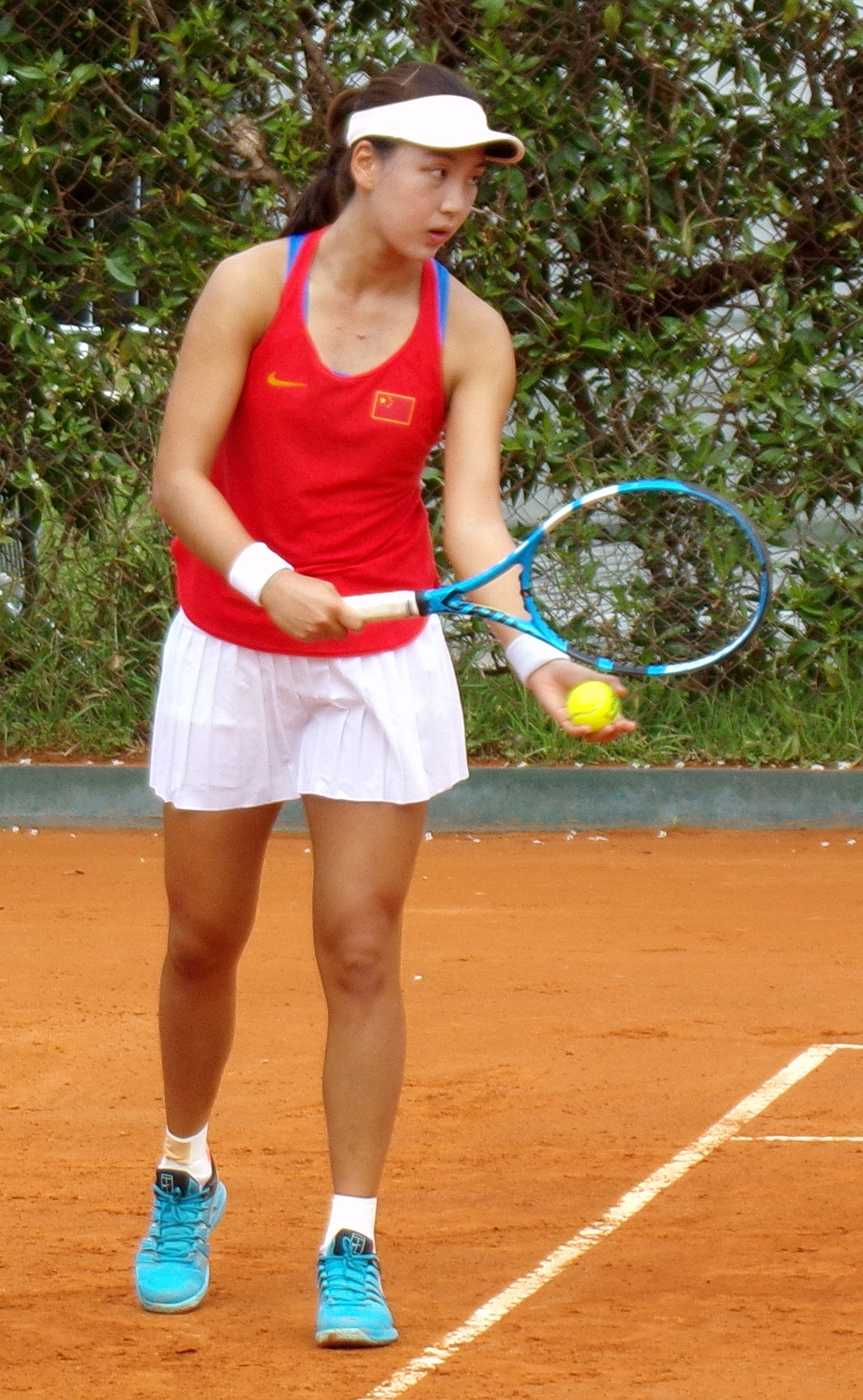
Wang at the 2018 Summer Youth Olympics

Wang booked her ticket to her major debut at the 2018 Australian Open on 3 December 2017 in Zhuhai by winning the Asia-Pacific Wildcard Playoffs, coming back to edge out the Papua New Guinean No. 1, Abigail Tere-Apisah, in the final. Tere-Apisah was only two points away from victory when leading 5–3, 30–0 in the second set, looking to become the first player from Papua New Guinea to compete in a major main draw, when momentum shifted and Wang, demonstrating fearlessness for her age, won the next seven points, before going on to level the match. Wang eventually won the match in three sets, seizing the most crucial break with a splendid backhand passing shot in the ninth game, and then closed out the final set after saving four break points. "It's probably the most important day in my life so far," Wang said in the post-match news conference to CCTV Sports Channel, the official TV broadcaster of the Australian Open in China. At the age of 16, she was the youngest Chinese player to make a Grand Slam championship main draw. At the 2018 Australian Open, as the second youngest competitor in the main draw (just older than 15-year-old Marta Kostyuk), Wang lost her debut match at a major to Alizé Cornet, in straight sets. But going through to the girls' doubles final with her partner Liang En-shuo from Taiwan, Wang claimed the title in a close match against Violet Apisah of Papua New Guinea (Abigail Tere-Apisah's niece) and Lulu Sun, a New Zealand-born Swiss player of Chinese descent.

=== 2019: WTA Premier debut, first career doubles title ===
She made her Premier Mandatory debut at the 2019 Miami Open as a wildcard.

In September, Wang reached her first WTA Tour-level final at the Jiangxi International Open in the doubles event. Alongside Zhu Lin, she defeated compatriots Peng Shuai and Zhang Shuai.

=== 2020–2021: Top 100 debut in singles ===
She made her debut in the top 100, after reaching the quarterfinal of the Ladies Linz at world No. 99 in the year-end rankings, on 15 November 2021. However, she lost to the eventual champion, Alison Riske.

=== 2022: First major win and top 75 in singles, top 100 in doubles ===
Wang won her first match in a Grand Slam tournament, which was against Ann Li, and was defeated in the second round at the Australian Open by world No. 2, Aryna Sabalenka.

She made her top 100 debut in doubles, on 25 April 2022, and top 75 in singles, on 16 May 2022, after winning her biggest title on the ITF World Tennis Tour at the 100k Solgironès Open in Spain.

=== 2023: Major title in doubles, singles fourth round and top 50 ===
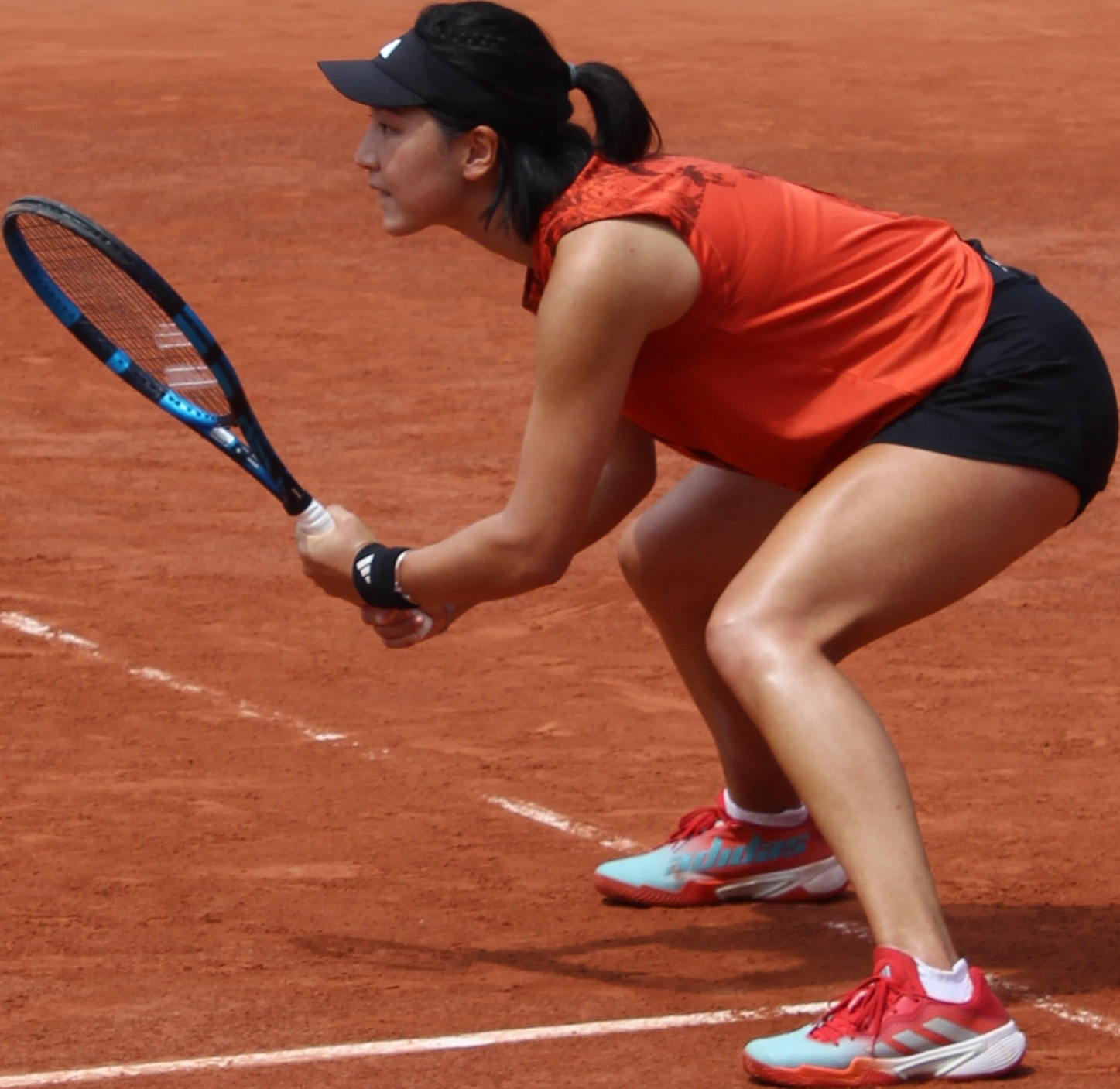
Wang won her first Grand Slam title at the 2023 French Open.

Partnering Hsieh Su-wei at the French Open, using protected ranking, she reached the final for the first time at a major. En-route the pair upset defending champion Kristina Mladenovic, who was partnering Zhang Shuai this year, in the second round, and fifth seeds Desirae Krawczyk and Demi Schuurs in the third. In the quarterfinals, they beat Veronika Kudermetova and Liudmila Samsonova, and in the semifinals sixth seeds Nicole Melichar-Martinez and Ellen Perez. In their first final as a pair, they defeated Leylah Fernandez and Taylor Townsend to win the title, their first title as a team and the first major title for Wang Xinyu.

At the US Open, she reached the fourth round in singles for the first time at a major.

At the China Open, she reached the third round at the WTA 1000 level for the second time by defeating 11th seed Daria Kasatkina. As a result, she reached the top 35 in the WTA rankings on 9 October 2023.

=== 2024: WTA 1000 singles & doubles semifinals, Olympic silver medal in mixed doubles ===
Using protected ranking on her debut, she reached in doubles, the second round at the Miami Open and the quarterfinals at the Madrid Open with Zheng Saisai. Also on her debut, she reached the semifinals for the first time at the next WTA 1000, the Italian Open, again with Zheng, upsetting top-seeded pair Hsieh/Mertens to face third seeds Gauff and Routliffe for a spot in the final. Wang and Zheng won the doubles at the Berlin Open.

At Wimbledon, she defeated world No. 5, Jessica Pegula, in the second round to record her first win over a top-10 ranked player. Wang went on to reach the fourth round before she lost to 21st seed Elina Svitolina. She won the silver medal with Zhang Zhizhen in mixed doubles at the Paris Summer Olympics.

At the Wuhan Open, she reached her first singles semifinal at the WTA 1000-level defeating second seed and world No. 3, Jessica Pegula, in the round of 16, her second top five win in three months, and Ekaterina Alexandrova in the quarterfinals. The semifinal between her and compatriot Zheng Qinwen was the first All-Chinese showdown at this level, where she lost to Zheng in straight sets.

=== 2025: WTA Tour singles final ===
Partnering with Zheng Saisai, Wang reached the doubles final at the Singapore Open, losing to second seeds Desirae Krawczyk and Giuliana Olmos.

At the Berlin Ladies Open, she qualified for the main draw and defeated Daria Kasatkina, second seed Coco Gauff, eighth seed Paula Badosa and Liudmila Samsonova to make it through to her first WTA Tour singles final. She lost the championship match to Markéta Vondroušová in three sets.

Seeded second at the Tennis in Cleveland, Wang overcame Suzan Lamens, qualifier Talia Gibson and Viktorija Golubic to reach the semifinals, at which point she lost to Ann Li.

=== 2026: Major fourth round, top 30 ===
Wang started her 2026 season at the ASB Classic in Auckland where, seeded seventh, she defeated Caty McNally, Renata Zarazúa, Francesca Jones and Alexandra Eala to make it into her second WTA Tour singles final. She lost the championship match to top seed Elina Svitolina in straight sets.

At the Australian Open, wins over qualifier Anhelina Kalinina, 24th seed Jeļena Ostapenko and 13th seed Linda Nosková saw her reach the second week of a Grand Slam tournament for the first time, at which point her run was ended by fourth seed Amanda Anisimova.

In February at the Transylvania Open, she teamed up again with Zheng Saisai to make it through to the doubles final, losing to Kamilla Rakhimova and Sara Sorribes Tormo.

At the French Open, she defeated Lilli Tagger in the first round before losing to Tamara Korpatsch in an emotionally heated three-set match. Wang received a code violation for walking to her opponent's side of the court while Korpatsch received a violation for celebrating too early. She refused to shake hands with Wang in the end after the latter reiterated her disapproval at net of Korpatsch allegedly pointing out a wrong ball mark to the umpire.

In June at the Bad Homburg Open, Wang defeated qualifier Renata Zarazua and Leylah Fernandez, before receiving a walkover into the semifinals when Elina Svitolina withdrew from the tournament. She lost to sixth seed Naomi Osaka in the last four.

== Coaching team ==
Wang's team consisted of her father, Wang Peng; a Serbian technical coach, Aleksandar Slović, who won the men's singles title at the 2009 Summer Universiade and once trained with Novak Djokovic when he was younger; a fitness coach, Miro Hrvatin from Croatia; and a Chinese physio from Nanjing. With the help of Slović, Wang was able to train with a few Serbian players abroad. She currently trains at the Tennis & Badminton Centre of the Shenzhen Sports Centre. She is also coached by Saisai Zheng.

== Performance timelines ==
Key
W	F	SF	QF	#R	RR	Q#	P#	DNQ	A	Z#	PO	G	S	B	NMS	NTI	P	NH

(W) winner; (F) finalist; (SF) semifinalist; (QF) quarterfinalist; (#R) rounds 4, 3, 2, 1; (RR) round-robin stage; (Q#) qualification round; (P#) preliminary round; (DNQ) did not qualify; (A) absent; (Z#) Davis/Fed Cup Zonal Group (with number indication) or (PO) play-off; (G) gold, (S) silver or (B) bronze Olympic/Paralympic medal; (NMS) not a Masters tournament; (NTI) not a Tier I tournament; (P) postponed; (NH) not held; (SR) strike rate (events won / competed); (W–L) win–loss record.
To avoid confusion and double counting, these charts are updated at the conclusion of a tournament or when the player's participation has ended.

Only main-draw results in WTA Tour, Grand Slam tournaments, Fed Cup/Billie Jean King Cup and Olympic Games are included in win–loss records.

=== Singles ===
Current through the 2026 US Open.

Tournament	2018	2019	2020	2021	2022	2023	2024	2025	2026	SR	W–L	Win%
Grand Slam tournaments
Australian Open	1R	A	Q3	Q1	2R	2R	1R	1R	4R	0 / 6	5–6	45%
French Open	A	A	Q3	Q1	1R	3R	3R	1R	2R	0 / 5	5–5	50%
Wimbledon	A	A	NH	1R	A	2R	4R	2R	2R	0 / 5	6–5	55%
US Open	A	1R	A	A	1R	4R	2R	2R	2R	0 / 6	6–6	50%
Win–Loss	0–1	0–1	0–0	0–1	1–3	7–4	6–4	2–4	6–4	0 / 22	22–22	50%
National representation
Summer Olympics	Not held			A	Not held		2R	Not held		0 / 1	1–1	50%
Billie Jean King Cup (Note: Formerly known as Fed Cup until 2020.)	A	A	PO (Note: Edition is split into the two years due to COVID-19.)		PO	A	A	QF		0 / 1	0–4	0%
WTA 1000 tournaments
Qatar Open	A	NTI	A	NTI	A	NTI	2R	1R	2R	0 / 3	2–3	40%
Dubai Championships	NTI	A	NTI	A	NTI	A	1R	1R	A	0 / 2	0–2	0%
Indian Wells Open	A	A	NH	Q1	Q1	3R	2R	3R	2R	0 / 4	5–4	56%
Miami Open	A	1R	NH	2R	1R	2R	3R	1R	2R	0 / 7	4–7	36%
Madrid Open	A	A	NH	A	A	1R	2R	1R	2R	0 / 4	1–4	20%
Italian Open	A	A	A	A	A	1R	2R	1R	2R	0 / 4	1–4	20%
Canadian Open	A	A	NH	A	Q1	A	A	A	1R	0 / 1	0–1	0%
Cincinnati Open	A	A	A	A	A	A	1R	2R	3R	0 / 3	3–3	50%
China Open	A	1R	Not held			3R	2R	1R	1R	0 / 4	3–4	43%
Wuhan Open	A	Q1	Not held				SF	1R	1R	0 / 2	4–2	67%
Win–Loss	0–0	0–2	0–0	1–1	0–1	5–5	11–9	3–9	3–7	0 / 34	23–34	40%
Career statistics
	2018	2019	2020	2021	2022	2023	2024	2025	2026	SR	W–L	Win%
Tournaments	2	6	2	9	18	18	26	23	14	Career total: 117		
Titles	0	0	0	0	0	0	0	0	0	Career total: 0		
Finals	0	0	0	0	0	0	0	1	1	Career total: 0		
Hard win–loss	0–2	3–6	0–2	10–6	5–13	21–13	18–16	13–16	13–10	0 / 86	83–84	50%
Clay win–loss	0–0	0–0	0–0	0–3	0–4	2–4	6–5	1–4	1–4	0 / 24	10–24	29%
Grass win–loss	0–0	0–0	0–0	0–2	1–2	1–2	3–3	3–3	0–0	0 / 12	8–12	40%
Overall win–loss	0–2	3–6	0–2	10–11	6–19	24–19	27–24	17–23	14–14	0 / 120	101–120	46%
Year-end ranking (Note: 2017: WTA ranking–983.)	306	150	153	99	97	32	37	57		$5,975,457		

=== Doubles ===
Current through the 2025 WTA Tour.

Tournament	2018	2019	2020	2021	2022	2023	2024	2025	SR	W–L	Win%
Grand Slam tournaments
Australian Open	A	A	A	A	A	2R	1R	3R	0 / 3	3–3	50%
French Open	A	A	A	A	A	W	3R	2R	1 / 3	9–2	82%
Wimbledon	A	A	NH	A	A	A	1R	1R	0 / 2	0–2	0%
US Open	A	A	A	A	1R	SF	1R	A	0 / 3	4–3	57%
Win–Loss	0–0	0–0	0–0	0–0	0–1	11–2	2–4	3–3	1 / 11	16–10	62%
Year-end championships
WTA Elite Trophy	DNQ	RR	Not held			DNQ	Not held		0 / 1	1–1	50%
National representation
Summer Olympics	Not held			A	Not held		1R	NH	0 / 1	0–1	0%
WTA 1000 tournaments
Qatar Open	A	NTI	A	NTI	A	NTI	1R	1R	0 / 2	0–2	0%
Dubai Championships	NTI	A	NTI	A	NTI	A	1R	1R	0 / 2	0–2	0%
Indian Wells Open	A	A	A	A	A	A	2R	A	0 / 1	1–1	50%
Miami Open	A	A	A	A	A	A	2R	QF	0 / 2	3–2	60%
Madrid Open	A	A	A	A	A	A	QF	1R	0 / 2	2–2	50%
Italian Open	A	A	A	A	A	A	SF	1R	0 / 2	2–2	50%
Canadian Open	A	A	A	A	A	A	A	A	0 / 0	0–0	–
Cincinnati Open	A	A	A	A	A	2R	1R	A	0 / 1	1–2	33%
China Open	A	A	Not held			1R	1R	A	0 / 2	0–2	0%
Wuhan Open	A	1R	Not held				A	A	0 / 1	0–1	0%
Career statistics
Tournaments	2	4	1	3	5	9	18	12	Career total: 24		
Titles	0	1	0	1	0	1	1	0	Career total: 4		
Finals	0	1	0	2	1	3	1	1	Career total: 9		
Overall win–loss	1–2	5–3	0–1	7–1	7–4	19–7	14-17	9–12	3 / 54	62–47	57%
Year-end ranking	228	243	252	143	195	22	54	91			

== Grand Slam tournament finals ==
=== Doubles: 1 (title) ===
Result	Year	Tournament	Surface	Partner	Opponents	Score
Win	2023	French Open	Clay	(Chinese Taipei) Hsieh Su-wei	(Canada) Leylah Fernandez (United States) Taylor Townsend	1–6, 7–6^{(7–5)}, 6–1

== Other significant finals ==
=== Summer Olympics ===
==== Mixed doubles: 1 (silver medal) ====
Result	Year	Tournament	Surface	Partner	Opponents	Score
Silver	2024	Paris Olympics, France	Clay	(China) Zhang Zhizhen	(Czech Republic) Kateřina Siniaková (Czech Republic) Tomáš Macháč	2–6, 7–5, [8–10]

== WTA Tour finals ==
=== Singles: 2 (2 runner-ups) ===
Legend WTA 500 (0–1) WTA 250 (0–1)	Finals by surface Hard (0–1) Grass (0–1)	Finals by setting Outdoor (0–2)

Result	W–L	Date	Tournament	Tier	Surface	Opponent	Score
Loss	0–1	Jun 2025	Berlin Open, Germany	WTA 500	Grass	(Czech Republic) Markéta Vondroušová	6–7^{(10–12)}, 6–4, 2–6
Loss	0–2	Jan 2026	Auckland Open, New Zealand	WTA 250	Hard	(Ukraine) Elina Svitolina	3–6, 6–7^{(6–8)}

=== Doubles: 10 (4 titles, 6 runner-ups) ===
Legend Grand Slam (1–0) WTA 1000 (0–0) WTA 500 (1–0) WTA 250 (2–6)	Finals by surface Hard (2–6) Clay (1–0) Grass (1–0)	Finals by setting Outdoor (3–3) Indoor (1–3)

Result	W–L	Date	Tournament	Tier	Surface	Partner	Opponents	Score
Win	1–0	Sep 2019	Jiangxi International, China	International (Note: The WTA International tournaments were reclassified as WTA 250 tournaments in 2021.)	Hard	(China) Zhu Lin	(China) Peng Shuai (China) Zhang Shuai	6–2, 7–6^{(7–5)}
Win	2–0	Oct 2021	Courmayeur Open, Italy	WTA 250	Hard (i)	(China) Zheng Saisai	(Japan) Eri Hozumi (China) Zhang Shuai	6–4, 3–6, [10–5]
Loss	2–1	Nov 2021	Ladies Linz, Austria	WTA 250	Hard (i)	(China) Zheng Saisai	(Russia) Natela Dzalamidze (Russia) Kamilla Rakhimova	4–6, 2–6
Loss	2–2	Feb 2022	Abierto Zapopan, Mexico	WTA 250	Hard	(China) Zhu Lin	(United States) Kaitlyn Christian; Lidziya Marozava	5–7, 3–6
Loss	2–3	Feb 2023	Hua Hin Championships, Thailand	WTA 250	Hard	(China) Zhu Lin	(Chinese Taipei) Chan Hao-ching (Chinese Taipei) Wu Fang-hsien	1–6, 6–7^{(6–8)}
Loss	2–4	Feb 2023	Mérida Open, Mexico	WTA 250	Hard	(Chinese Taipei) Wu Fang-hsien	(United States) Caty McNally (France) Diane Parry	0–6, 5–7
Win	3–4	Jun 2023	French Open, France	Grand Slam	Clay	(Chinese Taipei) Hsieh Su-wei	(Canada) Leylah Fernandez (United States) Taylor Townsend	1–6, 7–6^{(7–5)}, 6–1
Win	4–4	Jun 2024	Berlin Ladies Open, Germany	WTA 500	Grass	(China) Zheng Saisai	(Chinese Taipei) Chan Hao-ching; Veronika Kudermetova	6–2, 7–5
Loss	4–5	Feb 2025	Singapore Open, Singapore	WTA 250	Hard (i)	(China) Zheng Saisai	(United States) Desirae Krawczyk (Mexico) Giuliana Olmos	5–7, 0–6
Loss	4–6	Feb 2026	Transylvania Open, Romania	WTA 250	Hard (i)	(China) Zheng Saisai	(Uzbekistan) Kamilla Rakhimova (Spain) Sara Sorribes Tormo	6–7^{(7–9)}, 3–6

== WTA 125 finals ==
=== Singles: 1 (runner-up) ===
Result	Date	Tournament	Surface	Opponent	Score
Loss	Sep 2021	Columbus Challenger, United States	Hard (i)	(Spain) Nuria Párrizas Díaz	6–7^{(2–7)}, 3–6

=== Doubles: 1 (title) ===
Result	Date	Tournament	Surface	Partner	Opponents	Score
Win	Sep 2021	Columbus Challenger, United States	Hard (i)	(China) Zheng Saisai	(Slovenia) Dalila Jakupović (Spain) Nuria Párrizas Díaz	6–1, 6–1

== ITF Circuit finals ==
=== Singles: 12 (7 titles, 5 runner-ups) ===
Legend W100 tournaments (2–0) W60 tournaments (1–3) W25 tournaments (4–1) W15 tournaments (0–1)	Finals by surface Hard (6–3) Clay (1–2)

Result	W–L	Date	Tournament	Tier	Surface	Opponent	Score
Loss	0–1	Jun 2018	ITF Maribor, Slovenia	15k	Clay	(France) Irina Ramialison	2–6, 7–6^{(3)}, 5–7
Win	1–1	Aug 2018	ITF Nonthaburi, Thailand	25k	Hard	(China) Wang Xiyu	6–1, 4–6, 6–1
Win	2–1	Jun 2019	ITF Shenzhen, China	W25	Hard	(China) Xun Fangying	6–1, 6–0
Win	3–1	Jun 2019	ITF Hengyang, China	W25	Hard	(China) Sun Ziyue	6–4, 6–3
Win	4–1	Jul 2019	ITF Tianjin, China	W25	Hard	(Serbia) Jovana Jakšić	6–4, 6–2
Loss	4–2	Jul 2019	ITF Nonthaburi, Thailand	W25	Hard	(Japan) Yuki Naito	6–2, 6–7^{(4)}, 3–6
Loss	4–3	Apr 2021	Charlottesville Open, United States	W60	Clay	(United States) Claire Liu	6–3, 4–6, 1–4 ret.
Win	5–3	May 2022	Solgironès Open, Spain	W100+H	Clay	Erika Andreeva	3–6, 7–6^{(0)}, 6–0
Loss	5–4	Oct 2022	Trnava Indoor, Slovakia	W60	Hard (i)	(United Kingdom) Katie Swan	1–6, 6–3, 4–6
Loss	5–5	Nov 2022	Open Nantes Atlantique, France	W60	Hard (i)	Kamilla Rakhimova	4–6, 4–6
Win	6–5	Nov 2022	Tokyo Open, Japan	W60	Hard (i)	(Japan) Moyuka Uchijima	6–1, 4–6, 6–3
Win	7–5	Aug 2023	Landisville Tennis Challenge, US	W100	Hard	(United States) Madison Brengle	6–2, 6–3

=== Doubles: 5 (2 titles, 3 runner-ups) ===
Legend $60,000 tournaments (1–2) $25,000 tournaments (1–0) $15,000 tournaments (0–1)	Finals by surface Hard (2–2) Clay (0–1)

Result	W–L	Date	Tournament	Tier	Surface	Partner	Opponents	Score
Loss	0–1	Sep 2017	ITF Győr, Hungary	15,000	Clay	(Serbia) Tamara Čurović	(Austria) Mira Antonitsch (Hungary) Panna Udvardy	1–6, 2–6
Loss	0–2	Mar 2018	Pingshan Open, China	60,000	Hard	(Montenegro) Danka Kovinić	(Russia) Anna Kalinskaya (Slovakia) Viktória Kužmová	4–6, 6–1, [7–10]
Loss	0–3	Apr 2018	Blossom Cup, China	60,000	Hard	(China) Guo Hanyu	(China) Han Xinyun (China) Ye Qiuyu	6–7^{(3)}, 6–7^{(6)}
Win	1–3	Aug 2018	Jinan International Open, China	60,000	Hard	(China) You Xiaodi	(Chinese Taipei) Hsieh Yu-chieh (China) Lu Jingjing	6–3, 6–7^{(5)}, [10–2]
Win	2–3	Aug 2018	ITF Nonthaburi, Thailand	25,000	Hard	(China) Wang Xiyu	(Australia) Destanee Aiava (Australia) Naiktha Bains	7–5, 5–7, [10–4]

== Junior Grand Slam tournament performance ==
=== Singles ===
- Australian Open: SF (2018)
- French Open: 3R (2017, 2018)
- Wimbledon: SF (2018)
- US Open: 2R (2017)

=== Doubles ===
- Australian Open: W (2018)
- French Open: 2R (2017)
- Wimbledon: W (2018)
- US Open: SF (2017)

Result	Year	Tournament	Surface	Partner	Opponents	Score
Win	2018	Australian Open	Hard	(Chinese Taipei) Liang En-shuo	(Papua New Guinea) Violet Apisah (Switzerland) Lulu Sun	7–6^{(4)}, 4–6, [10–5]
Win	2018	Wimbledon	Grass	(China) Wang Xiyu	(United States) Caty McNally (United States) Whitney Osuigwe	6–2, 6–1

== Best Grand Slam results details ==
=== Singles ===
Australian Open
2026 Australian Open
Round	Opponent	Rank	Score	WXR
1R	(Ukraine) Anhelina Kalinina (Q)	No. 179	6–3, 6–3	No. 46
2R	(Latvia) Jeļena Ostapenko (24)	No. 24	4–6, 6–4, 6–4	No. 46
3R	(Czech Republic) Linda Nosková (13)	No. 13	7–5, 6–4	No. 46
4R	(United States) Amanda Anisimova (4)	No. 4	6–7^{(4–7)}, 4–6	No. 46

Wimbledon Championships
2024 Wimbledon
Round	Opponent	Rank	Score	WXR
1R	(Bulgaria) Viktoriya Tomova	No. 48	7–6^{(7–4)}, 3–6, 6–0	No. 42
2R	(United States) Jessica Pegula (5)	No. 5	6–4, 6–7^{(7–9)}, 6–1	No. 42
3R	(United Kingdom) Harriet Dart	No. 100	2–6, 7–5, 6–3	No. 42
4R	(Ukraine) Elina Svitolina (21)	No. 21	2–6, 1–6	No. 42

French Open
2023 French Open
Round	Opponent	Rank	Score	WXR
1R	(Czech Republic) Marie Bouzková (31)	No. 33	6–4, 7–6^{(7–5)}	No. 80
2R	(Sweden) Rebecca Peterson	No. 87	7–6^{(7–5)}, 6–2	No. 80
3R	(Poland) Iga Świątek (1)	No. 1	0–6, 0–6	No. 80
2024 French Open
Round	Opponent	Rank	Score	WXR
1R	(Germany) Jule Niemeier (Q)	No. 97	0–6, 6–2, 6–4	No. 37
2R	(Bulgaria) Viktoriya Tomova	No. 75	7–5, 5–7, 6–1	No. 37
3R	Anastasia Potapova	No. 41	5–7, 7–6^{(8–6)}, 4–6	No. 37

US Open
2023 US Open
Round	Opponent	Rank	Score	WXR
1R	(United States) Katie Volynets (Q)	No. 124	6–3, 6–4	No. 53
2R	(Spain) Sara Sorribes Tormo	No. 55	5–7, 6–3, 6–4	No. 53
3R	(Slovakia) Anna Karolína Schmiedlová	No. 64	4–6, 6–3, 6–2	No. 53
4R	(Czech Republic) Karolína Muchová (10)	No. 10	3–6, 7–5, 1–6	No. 53

== Head-to-head records ==
=== Record against top 10 players ===
Wang's record against players who have been ranked in the top 10. Active players are in boldface.

Player	Record	Win%	Hard	Clay	Grass	Last match
**Number 1 ranked players**						
**(Czech Republic) Karolína Plíšková**	0–1	0%	0–1	–	–	Lost (2–6, 4–6) at 2023 Miami
**(Poland) Iga Świątek**	0–1	0%	–	0–1	–	Lost (0–6, 0–6) at 2023 French Open
**(Japan) Naomi Osaka**	0–1	0%	–	–	0–1	Lost (3–6, 3–6) at 2026 Bad Homburg
**Aryna Sabalenka**	0–2	0%	0–2	–	–	Lost (1–6, 3–6) at 2026 Cincinnati
**(Spain)** Garbiñe Muguruza	0–2	0%	0–2	–	–	Lost (4–6, 1–6) at 2021 Miami
**(Kazakhstan) Elena Rybakina**	0–3	0%	0–2	0–1	–	Lost (2–6, 4–6) at 2026 Qatar
Number 2 ranked players						
**Vera Zvonareva**	1–0	100%	1–0	–	–	Won (6–4, 6–3) at 2023 Beijing
**(Spain) Paula Badosa**	1–1	50%	0–1	–	1–0	Won (6–1, 0–0 ret.) at 2025 Berlin
**(Tunisia) Ons Jabeur**	1–1	50%	–	–	1–1	Won (6–1, 3–6, 6–0) at 2025 Berlin
**(United States) Coco Gauff**	1–2	33%	0–1	–	1–1	Lost (3–6, 2–6) at 2025 Cincinnati
**(Czech Republic) Barbora Krejčíková**	0–2	0%	0–2	–	–	Lost 2–6, 7–6, 2–6) at 2023 Indian Wells
Number 3 ranked players						
**(United States) Jessica Pegula**	2–1	67%	1–1	–	1–0	Lost (2–6, 1–6) at 2025 Indian Wells
**(Greece) Maria Sakkari**	0–2	50%	0–1	0–1	–	Lost (4–6, 6–7) at 2025 Madrid
**(United States) Amanda Anisimova**	0–1	0%	0–1	–	–	Lost (6–7, 4–6) at 2026 Australian Open
**(United States) Sloane Stephens**	0–1	0%	–	0–1	–	Lost (2–6, 4–6) at 2021 Charleston
**(Ukraine) Elina Svitolina**	0–2	0%	0–1	–	0–1	Lost 3–6, 6–7) at 2026 Auckland
Number 4 ranked players						
**(Italy) Jasmine Paolini**	1–1	50%	1–0	0–1	–	Won (6–4, 6–3) at 2023 Cleveland
**(Switzerland) Belinda Bencic**	0–1	0%	–	–	0–1	Lost (5–7, 0–6) at 2026 Wimbledon
(Netherlands) Kiki Bertens	0–1	0%	–	0–1	–	Lost (2–6, 0–6) at 2021 BJK Cup Play-offs
(France) Caroline Garcia	0–1	0%	–	0–1	–	Lost (1–6, 4–6) at 2024 Madrid
**(China) Zheng Qinwen**	0–1	0%	0–1	–	–	Lost (3–6, 4–6) at 2024 Wuhan
**(United States) Sofia Kenin**	0–4	0%	0–2	–	0–2	Lost (1–6, 4–6) at 2024 Tokyo
Number 5 ranked players						
**(Italy) Sara Errani**	1–0	100%	–	–	1–0	Won (6–3, 6–4) at 2021 Nottingham
**(Latvia) Jeļena Ostapenko**	2–1	67%	2–1	–	–	Won (4–6, 6–4, 6–4) at 2026 Australian Open
**(United States) Madison Keys**	0–4	0%	0–2	0–1	0–1	Lost (6–7, 1–6) at 2026 Berlin
Number 6 ranked players						
**(Czech Republic) Karolína Muchová**	1–1	50%	0–1	–	1–0	Won (7–5, 6–2) at 2025 Wimbledon
**(Czech Republic) Linda Nosková**	1–1	50%	1–1	–	–	Won (7–5, 6–4) at 2026 Australian Open
**(Czech Republic) Markéta Vondroušová**	0–1	0%	–	–	0–1	Lost 6–7, 6–4, 2–6) at 2025 Berlin
Number 8 ranked players						
**(Australia) Daria Kasatkina**	2–2	50%	1–1	–	1–1	Lost (6–1, 6–7, 5–7) at 2026 Toronto
Number 9 ranked players						
**Veronika Kudermetova**	1–2	33%	1–2	–	–	Lost (2–6, 6–7) at 2025 Miami
**(Canada) Victoria Mboko**	0–1	0%	–	0–1	–	Lost (4–6, 0–6) at 2025 Parma
Number 10 ranked players						
**(France) Kristina Mladenovic**	1–0	100%	1–0	–	–	Won (6–4, 6–2) at 2022 Vancouver
**Ekaterina Alexandrova**	2–2	50%	2–2	–	–	Lost (2–6, 2–6) at 2025 US Open
**(United Kingdom) Emma Raducanu**	1–1	50%	1–0	–	0–1	Lost (5–7, 6–4, 3–6) at 2025 French Open
**(Brazil) Beatriz Haddad Maia**	1–4	20%	1–3	0–1	–	Lost (4–6, 6–3, 6–4) at 2024 Rome
**Total**	**20–52**	**28%**	**13–31 (30%)**	**0–10 (0%)**	**7–11 (39%)**	**current after the 2026 U.S Open Open**

=== Top 10 wins ===
- Wang has a 4–12 (25%) record against players who were, at the time the match was played, ranked in the top 10.

#	Opponent	Rk	Event	Surface	Rd	Score	WXR	Ref
**2024**
1.	(United States) Jessica Pegula	5	Wimbledon, UK	Grass	2R	6–4, 6–7^{(7–9)}, 6–1	42	
2.	(United States) Jessica Pegula	3	Wuhan Open, China	Hard	3R	6–3, 7–5	51	
**2025**
3.	(United States) Coco Gauff	2	Berlin Open, Germany	Grass	2R	6–3, 6–3	49	
4.	(Spain) Paula Badosa	10	Berlin Open, Germany	Grass	QF	6–1, 0–0 ret.	49	

*As of 3 October 2026
