= 2019 Torneig Internacional de Tennis Femení Solgironès – Singles =

Singles
- 2019 Torneig Internacional de Tennis Femení Solgironès

Final
- Champion: (China) Wang Xiyu
- Runner-up: (Hungary) Dalma Gálfi
- Score: 4–6, 6–3, 6–2

Events
Singles	Doubles
← 2018 ·	Torneig Internacional de Tennis Femení Solgironès	· 2021 →

Kathinka von Deichmann was the defending champion, but lost in the first round to Maryna Zanevska.

Wang Xiyu won the title, defeating Dalma Gálfi in the final, 4–6, 6–3, 6–2.

== Seeds ==
1. (Luxembourg) Mandy Minella (quarterfinals)
2. (Serbia) Ivana Jorović (second round)
3. (Switzerland) Stefanie Vögele (second round)
4. (Czech Republic) Marie Bouzková (second round)
5. (Serbia) Olga Danilović (second round)
6. (Spain) Paula Badosa Gibert (semifinals)
7. (Israel) Julia Glushko (first round)
8. (Spain) Aliona Bolsova (second round)

== Draw ==
=== Key ===
- Q = Qualifier
- WC = Wild card
- LL = Lucky loser
- Alt = Alternate
- SE = Special exempt
- PR = Protected ranking
- ITF = ITF entry
- JE = Junior exempt
- w/o = Walkover
- r = Retired
- d = Defaulted
- SR = Special ranking

=== Finals ===
Semifinals
6	(Spain) Paula Badosa Gibert	6	2	6^{5}
Q	(Hungary) Dalma Gálfi	4	6	7^{7}
(China) Wang Xiyu	2	6	7^{7}
(Georgia (country)) Ekaterine Gorgodze	6	3	6^{2}

Final
Q	(Hungary) Dalma Gálfi	6	3	2
(China) Wang Xiyu	4	6	6

=== Top half ===
First round
1	(Luxembourg) M Minella	6	7
Q	(United Kingdom) F Jones	2	5
(Ukraine) K Zavatska	7	0	2
(Belgium) Y Wickmayer	5	6	6
Q	(Spain) R Vicens Mas	6	6
WC	(Spain) E Guerrero Álvarez	3	4
(Slovakia) K Kučová	4	4
6	(Spain) P Badosa Gibert	6	6
4	(Czech Republic) M Bouzková	6	6
(Greece) V Grammatikopoulou	3	2
WC	(Germany) S Lisicki	1	1
Q	(Hungary) D Gálfi	6	6
(Liechtenstein) K von Deichmann	2	4
(Belgium) M Zanevska	6	6
SE	(Argentina) N Podoroska	6^{8}	2
5	(Serbia) O Danilović	7^{10}	6

Second round
1	(Luxembourg) M Minella	6	7^{7}
(Belgium) Y Wickmayer	3	6^{4}
Q	(Spain) R Vicens Mas	3	1
6	(Spain) P Badosa Gibert	6	6
4	(Czech Republic) M Bouzková	6	3	3
Q	(Hungary) D Gálfi	3	6	6
(Belgium) M Zanevska	6	7^{7}
5	(Serbia) O Danilović	3	6^{4}

Quarterfinals
1	(Luxembourg) M Minella	3	4
6	(Spain) P Badosa Gibert	6	6
Q	(Hungary) D Gálfi	3	6	6
(Belgium) M Zanevska	6	1	2

Semifinals
6	(Spain) P Badosa Gibert	6	2	6^{5}
Q	(Hungary) D Gálfi	4	6	7^{7}

=== Bottom half ===
First round
7	(Israel) J Glushko	3	7^{7}	0
(China) Xiy Wang	6	6^{1}	6
(Russia) V Flink	4	1
SE	(Chile) D Seguel	6	6
Q	(Ukraine) M Kostyuk	6	6
(Australia) Ar Rodionova	1	1
Q	(Sweden) M Björklund	6	5	4
3	(Switzerland) S Vögele	1	7	6
8	(Spain) A Bolsova	6	7^{7}
WC	(Spain) C Hoste Ferrer	1	6^{2}
Q	(United Kingdom) N Bains	7	7^{7}
(Spain) G García Pérez	5	6^{3}
(Georgia (country)) E Gorgodze	1	7^{7}	7^{7}
(Australia) Z Hives	6	6^{4}	6^{0}
WC	(Mexico) R Zarazúa	2	3
2	(Serbia) I Jorović	6	6

Second round
(China) Xiy Wang	6	6
SE	(Chile) D Seguel	4	3
Q	(Ukraine) M Kostyuk	6	6
3	(Switzerland) S Vögele	2	3
8	(Spain) A Bolsova	6	4	2
Q	(United Kingdom) N Bains	0	6	6
(Georgia (country)) E Gorgodze	6	7
2	(Serbia) I Jorović	4	5

Quarterfinals
(China) Xiy Wang	7	7
Q	(Ukraine) M Kostyuk	5	5
Q	(United Kingdom) N Bains	2	5
(Georgia (country)) E Gorgodze	6	7

Semifinals
(China) Xiy Wang	2	6	7^{7}
(Georgia (country)) E Gorgodze	6	3	6^{2}
