= Torneig Internacional de Tennis Femení Solgironès =

Open Internacional Femení Solgironès

Defunct tennis tournament
- Event name: Torneig Internacional de Tennis Femení Solgironès Open Catalunya Ciutat de La Bisbal
- Tour: WTA Challenger Tour
- Founded: 2016
- Abolished: 2025
- Location: La Bisbal d'Empordà, Spain
- Venue: Club Esportiu CT La Bisbal
- Category: WTA 125
- Surface: Clay
- Draw: 32S/8Q/8D
- Prize money: $115,000
- Website: Open Internacional Solgironès

Current champions (2025)
- Women's singles: (Latvia) Darja Semeņistaja
- Women's doubles: (Belgium) Magali Kempen (Czech Republic) Anna Sisková

The Open Internacional de Tennis Femení Solgironès - Catalunya Ciutat de La Bisbal was a tournament for professional female tennis players. The event was classified as a WTA 125 tournament and was held in La Bisbal d'Empordà, Spain, from 2016 until 2025 on outdoor clay courts. The tournament was classified as ITF event until 2022, before being upgraded to the Challenger level in 2023. In 2026 it became the Catalonia Open Solgironès.

== Past finals ==
=== Singles ===
Year	Champion	Runner-up	Score
2026	Not Held, see Catalonia Open		
2025	(Latvia) Darja Semeņistaja	(Hungary) Dalma Gálfi	5–7, 6–0, 6–4
2024	(Argentina) María Lourdes Carlé	(Spain) Rebeka Masarova	3–6, 6–1, 6–2
2023	(Netherlands) Arantxa Rus	(Hungary) Panna Udvardy	7–6^{(7–2)}, 6–2
⬆️ WTA 125 event ⬆️
2022	(China) Wang Xinyu	Erika Andreeva	3–6, 7–6^{(7–0)}, 6–0
2021	(Russia) Irina Khromacheva	(Netherlands) Arantxa Rus	6–4, 1–6, 7–6^{(10–8)}
2020	Tournament cancelled due to the COVID-19 pandemic		
2019	(China) Wang Xiyu	(Hungary) Dalma Gálfi	4–6, 6–3, 6–2
2018	(Liechtenstein) Kathinka von Deichmann	(Spain) Sara Sorribes Tormo	6–3, 3–6, 6–3
2017	(Spain) Georgina García Pérez	(Spain) Estrella Cabeza Candela	6–2, 0–6, 6–4
2016	(Mexico) Renata Zarazúa	(Spain) Irene Burillo	6–7^{(3–7)}, 6–1, 6–4

=== Doubles ===
Year	Champions	Runners-up	Score
2025	(Belgium) Magali Kempen (Czech Republic) Anna Sisková (2)	(Latvia) Darja Semeņistaja (Serbia) Nina Stojanović	7–6^{(7–1)}, 6–1
2024	(Czech Republic) Miriam Kolodziejová (Czech Republic) Anna Sisková	(Hungary) Tímea Babos (Hungary) Dalma Gálfi	w/o
2023	(United States) Caroline Dolehide; Diana Shnaider	(Spain) Aliona Bolsova (Spain) Rebeka Masarova	7–6^{(7–5)}, 6–3
⬆️ WTA 125 event ⬆️
2022	(Andorra) Victoria Jiménez Kasintseva (Mexico) Renata Zarazúa	(United Kingdom) Alicia Barnett (United Kingdom) Olivia Nicholls	6–4, 2–6, [10–8]
2021	(Russia) Valentina Ivakhnenko (Romania) Andreea Prisăcariu	(Germany) Mona Barthel (Luxembourg) Mandy Minella	6–3, 6–1
2020	Tournament cancelled due to the COVID-19 pandemic		
2019	(Australia) Arina Rodionova (Australia) Storm Sanders	(Hungary) Dalma Gálfi (Spain) Georgina García Pérez	6–4, 6–4
2018	(United States) Jamie Loeb (Mexico) Ana Sofía Sánchez	(Spain) Yvonne Cavallé Reimers (United States) Chiara Scholl	6–3, 6–2
2017	(Russia) Olesya Pervushina (Ukraine) Valeriya Strakhova	(Romania) Jaqueline Cristian (Mexico) Renata Zarazúa	7–5, 6–2
2016	(Spain) Irene Burillo (Russia) Ksenija Sharifova	(Serbia) Anđela Novčić (Italy) Natasha Piludu	7–5, 6–4
