= Andreea Prisăcariu =

Romanian tennis player (born 2000)

- Country (sports): Romania
- Born: 9 February 2000 (age 26) Iași, Romania
- Height: 1.70 m (5 ft 7 in)
- Plays: Right (two-handed backhand)
- Prize money: $155,387

Singles
- Career record: 305–213
- Career titles: 7 ITF
- Highest ranking: No. 304 (16 May 2022)
- Current ranking: No. 436 (8 June 2026)

Doubles
- Career record: 161–152
- Career titles: 11 ITF
- Highest ranking: No. 200 (11 April 2022)
- Current ranking: No. 549 (8 June 2026)
- Last updated on: 8 June 2026.

Andreea Prisăcariu (born 9 February 2000) is a Romanian professional tennis player.

Prisăcariu has career-high WTA rankings of 304 in singles and 200 in doubles. She has won seven singles titles and eleven doubles titles on the ITF Circuit.

Prisăcariu won her biggest title at the 2021 Solgironès Open, in the doubles event partnering Valentina Ivakhnenko.

She made her WTA Tour main-draw debut as a wildcard entrant at the 2021 Transylvania Open, losing to Lesia Tsurenko in the first round.

== ITF Circuit finals ==
=== Singles: 11 (7 titles, 4 runner-ups) ===
Legend W25/35 tournaments W15 tournaments	Finals by surface Hard (0–1) Clay (7–3)

Result	W–L	Date	Tournament	Tier	Surface	Opponent	Score
Win	1–0	Aug 2019	ITF Tabarka, Tunisia	W15	Clay	(Egypt) Sandra Samir	6–4, 6–4
Win	2–0	Aug 2019	ITF Tabarka, Tunisia	W15	Clay	(Italy) Aurora Zantedeschi	2–6, 6–2, 6–1
Loss	2–1	Nov 2019	ITF Monastir, Tunisia	W15	Hard	(France) Carole Monnet	2–6, 1–3 ret.
Win	3–1	Feb 2021	ITF Antalya, Turkey	W15	Clay	(Italy) Aurora Zantedeschi	6–3, 7–5
Win	4–1	Apr 2021	ITF Antalya, Turkey	W15	Clay	(Spain) Ane Mintegi del Olmo	6–3, 7–5
Loss	4–2	Jun 2021	ITF Klosters, Switzerland	W25	Clay	(Switzerland) Ylena In-Albon	3–6, 2–6
Win	5–2	Apr 2023	ITF Santa Margherita di Pula, Italy	W25	Clay	(Romania) Miriam Bulgaru	3–6, 6–2, 6–2
Loss	5–3	Jan 2024	ITF Antalya, Turkey	W15	Clay	(Spain) Andrea Lázaro García	6–4, 3–6, 1–6
Loss	5–4	Feb 2024	ITF Antalya, Turkey	W15	Clay	(Hungary) Amarissa Tóth	6–4, 2–6, 2–6
Win	6–4	May 2024	ITF Kuršumlijska Banja, Serbia	W15	Clay	(Romania) Ioana Zvonaru	5–7, 6–4, 7–5
Win	7–4	Jan 2026	ITF Antalya, Türkiye	W35	Clay	(Spain) Carlota Martínez Círez	2–6, 7–6^{(6)}, 7–6^{(3)}

=== Doubles: 18 (11 titles, 7 runner-ups) ===
Legend W60 tournaments W40 tournaments W25/35 tournaments W15 tournaments	Finals by surface Hard (5–2) Clay (6–5)

Result	W–L	Date	Tournament	Tier	Surface	Partner	Opponents	Score
Loss	0–1	Nov 2018	ITF Antalya, Turkey	W15	Hard	(Romania) Ioana Gașpar	(Romania) Georgia Crăciun (Romania) Oana Georgeta Simion	1–6, 3–6
Win	1–1	Apr 2019	ITF Antalya	W15	Clay	(Russia) Victoria Mikhaylova	(Switzerland) Marie Mettraux (Switzerland) Joanne Züger	6–2, 6–4
Win	2–1	Jan 2020	ITF Antalya	W15	Clay	(Romania) Georgia Crăciun	(Italy) Martina Colmegna (Croatia) Silvia Njirić	7–5, 7–5
Win	3–1	Mar 2020	ITF Monastir, Tunisia	W15	Hard	(France) Mylène Halemai	(Bulgaria) Petia Arshinkova (Bulgaria) Gergana Topalova	6–3, 6–4
Win	4–1	Mar 2020	ITF Monastir, Tunisia	W15	Hard	(Germany) Sina Herrmann	(Spain) Yvonne Cavallé Reimers (Serbia) Bojana Marinković	1–6, 6–3, [10–4]
Win	5–1	Dec 2020	ITF Antalya, Turkey	W15	Clay	(Romania) Andreea Roșca	(Ukraine) Viktoriia Dema (Romania) Cristina Dinu	3–6, 6–4, [10–6]
Loss	5–2	May 2021	Zagreb Ladies Open, Croatia	W60	Clay	(Slovenia) Nika Radišić	(Austria) Barbara Haas (Poland) Katarzyna Kawa	6–7^{(1)}, 7–5, [6–10]
Win	6–2	May 2021	Solgironès Open, Spain	W60	Clay	(Russia) Valentina Ivakhnenko	(Germany) Mona Barthel (Luxembourg) Mandy Minella	6–3, 6–1
Win	7–2	Sep 2021	ITF Trieste, Italy	W25	Clay	(Slovenia) Nika Radišić	(Lithuania) Justina Mikulskytė (Australia) Olivia Tjandramulia	7–5, 6–2
Win	8–2	Jan 2023	ITF Monastir, Tunisia	W40	Hard	(Burundi) Sada Nahimana	(Russia) Alena Fomina-Klotz (Belarus) Iryna Shymanovich	7–5, 6–4
Loss	8–3	Sep 2023	ITF Slobozia, Romania	W25	Clay	(Romania) Ilona Georgiana Ghioroaie	(Romania) Oana Gavrilă (Ukraine) Valeriya Strakhova	2–6, 5–7
Win	9–3	Dec 2023	ITF Monastir, Tunisia	W15	Hard	(Brazil) Ana Candiotto	(France) Aminata Sall (France) Marie Villet	6–1, 6–0
Loss	9–4	May 2024	ITF Kuršumlijska Banja, Serbia	W15	Clay	(Serbia) Elena Milovanović	(Romania) Karola Bejenaru (Algeria) Inès Ibbou	6–7^{(8)}, 7–6^{(6)}, [5–10]
Loss	9–5	Jul 2024	ITF Aschaffenburg, Germany	W35	Clay	(Czech Republic) Julie Štruplová	(Netherlands) Jasmijn Gimbrère (Netherlands) Stéphanie Visscher	1–6, 6–1, [3–10]
Loss	9–6	Oct 2024	ITF Santa Margherita di Pula, Italy	W35	Clay	(Italy) Federica Urgesi	(Greece) Sapfo Sakellaridi (Sweden) Lisa Zaar	3–6, 4–6
Win	10–6	Oct 2024	ITF Istanbul, Turkey	W35	Hard (i)	(Latvia) Kamilla Bartone	(Sweden) Jacqueline Cabaj Awad (Croatia) Iva Primorac	6–4, 6–2
Loss	10–7	Dec 2024	ITF Sharm El Sheikh, Egypt	W35	Hard	(Latvia) Kamilla Bartone	(Russia) Polina Iatcenko (Slovakia) Katarína Kužmová	4–6, 4–6
Win	11–7	Jan 2026	ITF Antalya, Türkiye	W35	Clay	(Russia) Darya Astakhova	(Croatia) Lucija Ćirić Bagarić (Hungary) Amarissa Tóth	6–2, 3–6, [10–8]
