= Victoria Jiménez Kasintseva =

Andorran tennis player (born 2005)

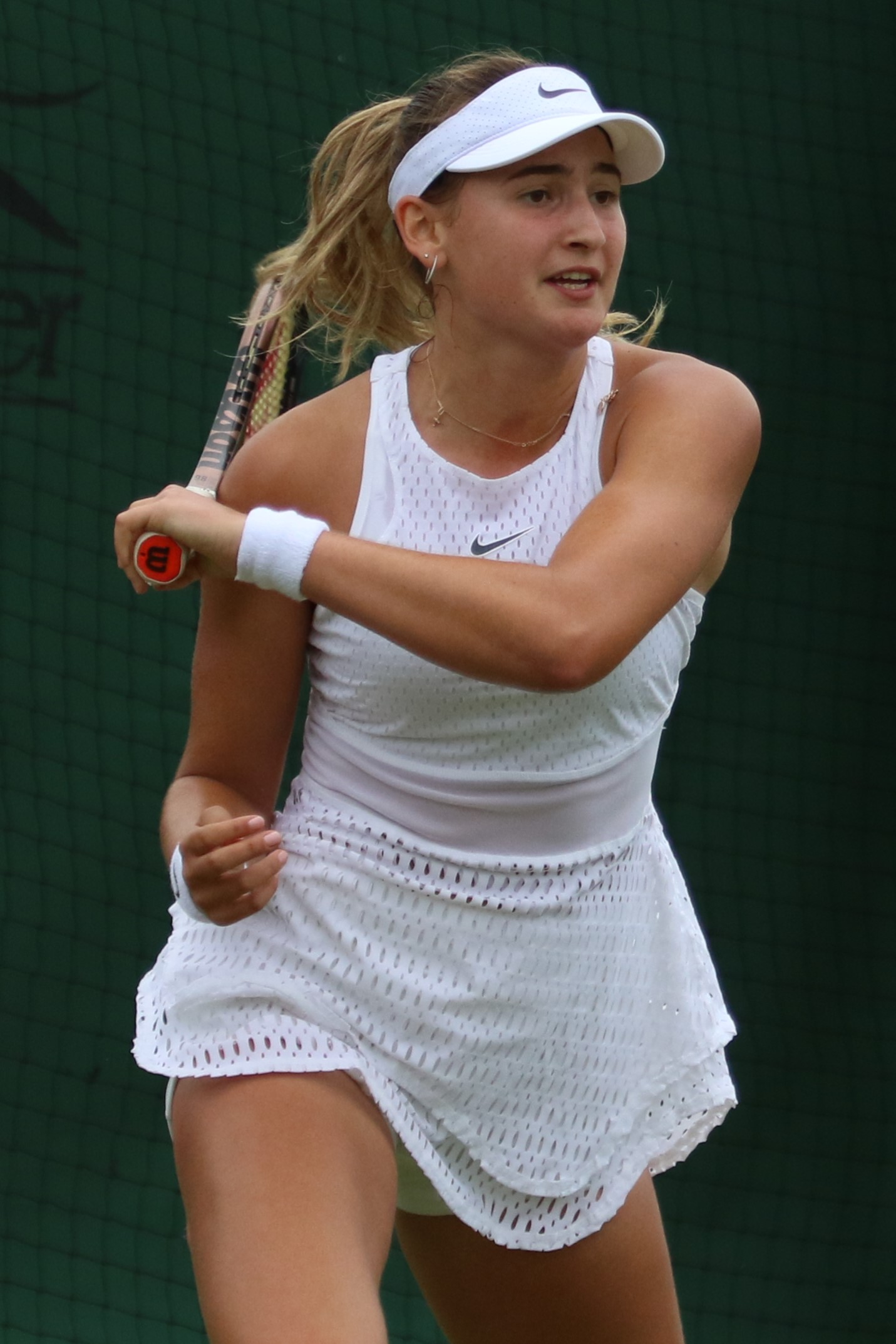
- Jiménez Kasintseva at the 2023 Wimbledon Championships
- Country (sports): Andorra
- Residence: Barcelona, Spain
- Born: 9 August 2005 (age 21) Andorra la Vella, Andorra
- Height: 1.80 m (5 ft 11 in)
- Turned pro: 2020
- Plays: Left-handed (two-handed backhand)
- Coach: Joan Jiménez Guerra
- Prize money: US$ 1,212,146

Singles
- Career record: 187–151
- Career titles: 0 WTA, 5 ITF
- Highest ranking: No. 89 (16 March 2026)
- Current ranking: No. 214 (2 November 2026)

Grand Slam singles results
- Australian Open: Q3 (2023)
- French Open: Q1 (2022, 2023, 2025, 2026)
- Wimbledon: 1R (2026)
- US Open: 1R (2025)

Doubles
- Career record: 26–38
- Career titles: 1 ITF
- Highest ranking: No. 309 (31 October 2022)
- Current ranking: No. 1,102 (19 October 2026)
- Last updated on: 23 October 2026.

Victoria Jiménez Kasintseva (born 9 August 2005) is an Andorran professional tennis player. On 16 March 2026, she reached a career-high singles ranking by the WTA of 89, the first Andorran player, female or male, to break into the top 100 in the tennis rankings in the Open Era.

== Early life and background ==
Victoria Jiménez Kasintseva was born in Andorra la Vella, Andorra to Andorran father Joan Jiménez Guerra and Russian mother Yulia Kasintseva. Her father is a former tennis professional who reached a career-high ATP Tour ranking of 505. Her brother, Joan, also plays tennis. She spent three years of her childhood living in Kentucky in the United States from age 4 to age 8.

She began playing tennis at the age of three in 2008, and currently trains in Barcelona with her father. She speaks Spanish, English, French, and Russian fluently, in addition to her native Catalan.

== Career ==
=== Juniors ===
In 2020, Jiménez Kasintseva won the Australian Open girls' singles title as the youngest player in the draw, defeating Weronika Baszak in the final. She was the first Andorran to win a junior major title, as well as the youngest player to win a major final since Coco Gauff at the 2018 French Open. She has won eight singles titles on the ITF Junior Circuit and one doubles title, and she achieved a career-high junior ranking of No. 1 on 9 March 2020.

==== Grand Slam performance ====
Singles:

- Australian Open: W (2020)
- French Open: QF (2021)
- Wimbledon: SF (2021)
- US Open: QF (2021)

Doubles:

- Australian Open: 1R (2020)
- French Open: SF (2021)
- Wimbledon: 1R (2021)
- US Open: SF (2021)

=== 2021: Professional debut ===
At the age of 15, Jiménez Kasintseva made her WTA Tour main-draw debut as a wildcard at the 2021 Madrid Open. She was the youngest player and the first from Andorra to compete in a WTA tournament main draw. Jiménez Kasintseva lost to Kiki Bertens in the first round. She won her first ITF singles title in Aparecida de Goiânia and she reached the final in Maspalomas, where she was defeated by Arantxa Rus.

=== 2022–2024: First WTA Tour quarterfinal and WTA 1000 win ===
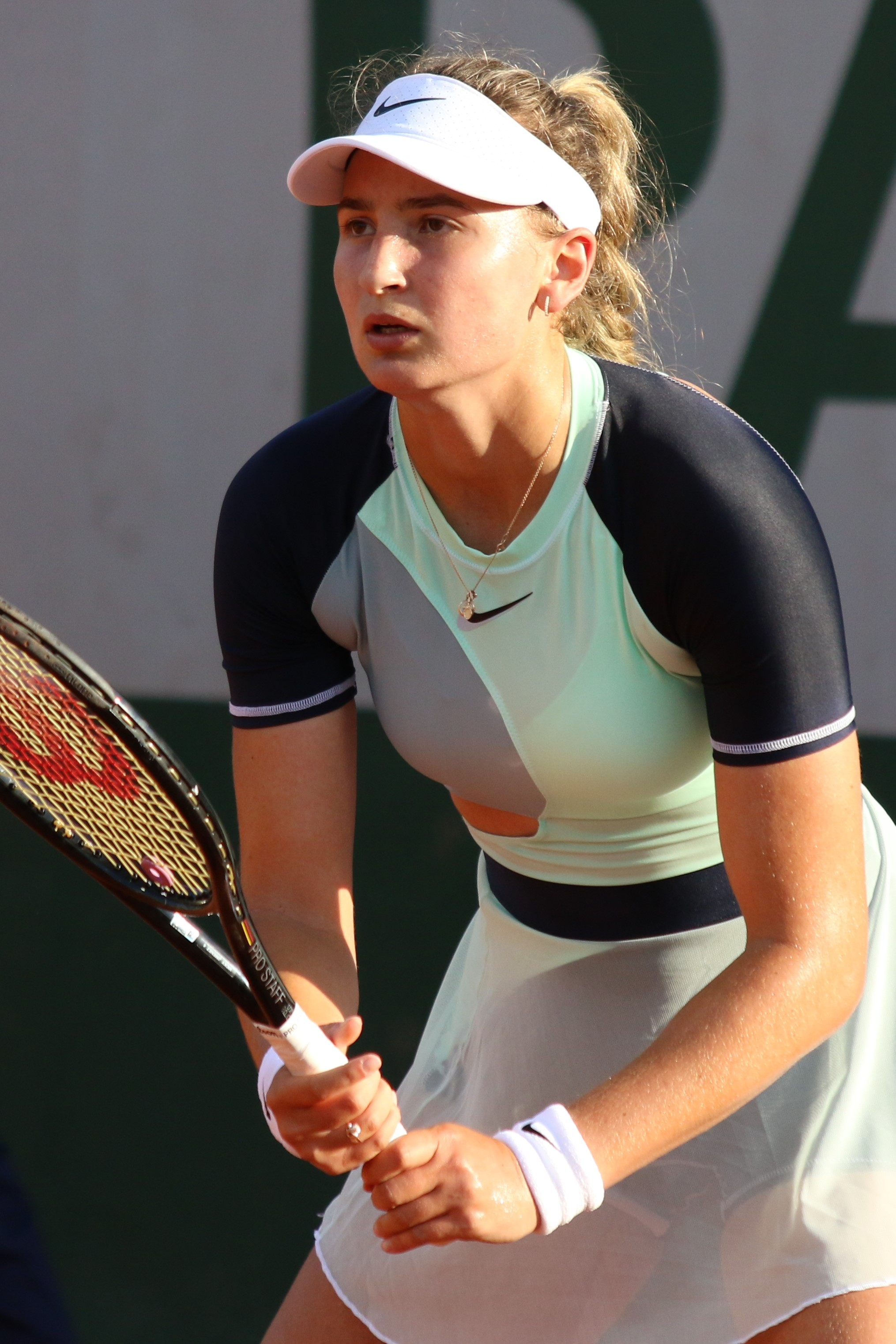
Jiménez Kasintseva at the 2022 French Open

Having gained entry as a lucky loser, Jiménez Kasintseva recorded her first WTA Tour wins at the 2022 Korea Open, defeating Chloé Paquet and Rebecca Marino to become the first Andorran to reach a first Tour quarterfinal She lost to Jeļena Ostapenko in the quarterfinals. She won her second ITF singles title in Loulé as the top seed in the tournament, and won her first ITF Circuit doubles title at the Solgironès Open, partnered with Renata Zarazúa. Jiménez Kasintseva also reached the singles final in Bendigo, losing to Ysaline Bonaventure.

In 2023, she received wildcards into the main draw at the WTA 1000 tournaments in Miami and Madrid, losing in the first round at both. That year, she won two W25 titles, at Boca Raton and Austin.

She also received a wildcard into the main draw at the 2024 Madrid Open, where she defeated Zhu Lin in the first round for her first WTA 1000 win, then lost to Jasmine Paolini.

=== 2025–2026: Historic major, top 100, WTA 1000 debuts ===
In March 2025, Jiménez Kasintseva finished runner-up at the Antalya Challenger, losing to Olga Danilović. She also reached the final at the WTA 125 Makarska Open in Croatia, losing to Sára Bejlek.

In August 2025, Jiménez Kasintseva qualified for the main draw of the US Open, making her debut appearance in the main draw of a Grand Slam tournament. With her qualification, she became the first Andorran player, male or female, to compete in the main draw of a major. She lost to Maya Joint in the first round.

At the 2026 Mérida Open, she qualified for the main-draw and defeated Yulia Putintseva and eighth seed Magda Linette to make it through to the quarterfinals, at which point her run was ended by fellow qualifier Zhang Shuai. Despite the loss, Jiménez Kasintseva moved up 25 places in the WTA rankings to No. 97 on 2 March 2026, becoming the first player from Andorra – female or male – to break into the world's top 100. Later that week at the WTA 1000 tournament in Indian Wells, she again progressed through the qualifying rounds to earn a spot in the main draw and then overcame Caty McNally, before losing to 16th seed Naomi Osaka in the second round.

== Performance timeline ==
Key
W	F	SF	QF	#R	RR	Q#	P#	DNQ	A	Z#	PO	G	S	B	NMS	NTI	P	NH

(W) winner; (F) finalist; (SF) semifinalist; (QF) quarterfinalist; (#R) rounds 4, 3, 2, 1; (RR) round-robin stage; (Q#) qualification round; (P#) preliminary round; (DNQ) did not qualify; (A) absent; (Z#) Davis/Fed Cup Zonal Group (with number indication) or (PO) play-off; (G) gold, (S) silver or (B) bronze Olympic/Paralympic medal; (NMS) not a Masters tournament; (NTI) not a Tier I tournament; (P) postponed; (NH) not held; (SR) strike rate (events won / competed); (W–L) win–loss record.
To avoid confusion and double counting, these charts are updated at the conclusion of a tournament or when the player's participation has ended.

Only main-draw results in WTA Tour, Grand Slam tournaments, Fed Cup/Billie Jean King Cup and Olympic Games are included in win–loss records.

=== Singles ===
Current through the 2026 US Open.

Tournament	2021	2022	2023	2024	2025	2026	SR	W–L
Grand Slam tournaments
Australian Open	Q1	Q2	Q3	A	Q1	Q2	0 / 0	0–0
French Open	A	Q1	Q1	A	Q1	Q1	0 / 0	0–0
Wimbledon	A	Q3	Q1	A	Q2	1R	0 / 1	0–1
US Open	A	Q1	Q1	Q1	1R	Q1	0 / 1	0–1
Win–Loss	0–0	0–0	0–0	0–0	0–1	0–1	0 / 2	0–2
WTA 1000
Dubai / Qatar Open (Note: The first Premier 5 event of the year has switched back and forth between the Dubai Tennis Championships and the Qatar Ladies Open since 2009. Dubai was classified as a Premier 5 event from 2009 to 2011 before being succeeded by Doha for the 2012–2014 period. In 2015, Dubai regained its Premier 5 status while Doha was demoted to Premier status. The Premier 5 tournaments were reclassified as WTA 1000 tournaments in 2021.)	A	A	A	A	A	A	0 / 0	0–0
Indian Wells Open	A	A	A	A	A	2R	0 / 1	1–1
Miami Open	A	A	1R	1R	A	Q1	0 / 2	0–2
Madrid Open	1R	A	1R	2R	1R	1R	0 / 5	1–5
Italian Open	A	A	A	A	A	Q1	0 / 0	0–0
Canadian Open	A	A	A	A	A	1R	0 / 1	0–1
Cincinnati Open	A	A	A	A	A	Q1	0 / 0	0–0
Wuhan Open	A	NH	A	A	A	A	0 / 0	0–0
China Open	A	NH	A	A	1R	A	0 / 1	0–1
Guadalajara Open	NH	A	A	A	NMS	A	0 / 0	0–0
Win–Loss	0–1	0–0	0–2	1–2	0–2	1–3	0 / 10	2–10
Career statistics								
	2021	2022	2023	2024	2025	2026	SR	W–L
Tournaments	1	2	2	2	8	3	Career total: 15	
Titles	0	0	0	0	0	0	Career total: 0	
Finals	0	0	0	0	0	0	Career total: 0	
Hard win–loss	0–0	2–2	0–1	0–1	2–6	3–2	0 / 12	7–12
Clay win–loss	0–1	0–0	0–1	1–1	1–2	0–1	0 / 6	2–6
Grass win–loss	0–0	0–0	0–0	0–0	0–0	0–0	0 / 0	0–0
Overall win–loss	0–1	2–2	0–2	1–2	3–8	3–3	0 / 18	9–18
Year-end ranking	373	129	303	151	107		$1,212,146	

== WTA 125 finals ==
=== Singles: 2 (runner-ups) ===
Result	W–L	Date	Tournament	Surface	Opponent	Score
Loss	0–1	Mar 2025	Antalya Challenger, Turkey	Clay	(Serbia) Olga Danilović	2–6, 3–6
Loss	0–2	Jun 2025	Makarska International, Croatia	Clay	(Czech Republic) Sára Bejlek	0–6, 1–6

== ITF Circuit finals ==
=== Singles: 10 (5 titles, 5 runner-ups) ===
Legend W100 tournaments W60 tournaments W40/50 tournaments W25/35 tournaments	Finals by surface Hard (3–3) Clay (2–2)

Result	W–L	Date	Tournament	Tier	Surface	Opponent	Score
Loss	0–1	Aug 2021	ITF San Bartolomé, Spain	W60	Clay	(Netherlands) Arantxa Rus	0–6, 1–6
Win	1–1	Nov 2021	ITF Aparecida de Goiania, Brazil	W25	Clay	(Hungary) Panna Udvardy	6–3, 7–5
Loss	1–2	Jan 2022	Bendigo International, Australia	W60+H	Hard	(Belgium) Ysaline Bonaventure	3–6, 1–6
Win	2–2	Oct 2022	ITF Loulé, Portugal	W25	Hard	(Ukraine) Katarina Zavatska	6–1, 6–4
Win	3–2	Mar 2023	ITF Boca Raton, United States	W25	Hard	(United States) Whitney Osuigwe	6–2, 6–2
Win	4–2	Nov 2023	ITF Austin, United States	W25	Hard	(United States) Hanna Chang	6–0, 6–2
Loss	4–3	Jan 2024	ITF Monastir, Tunisia	W35	Hard	(Canada) Carson Branstine	2–6, 2–6
Loss	4–4	May 2024	ITF Otočec, Slovenia	W50	Clay	(Netherlands) Anouk Koevermans	6–1, 4–6, 5–7
Loss	4–5	Jul 2024	Open Araba en Femenino, Spain	W100	Hard	(Philippines) Alexandra Eala	4–6, 4–6
Win	5–5	Sep 2024	Lisboa Belém Open, Portugal	W75	Clay	(Spain) Guiomar Maristany	6–4, 6–2

=== Doubles: 2 (1 title, 1 runner-up) ===
Legend W100 tournaments W15 tournaments	Finals by surface Clay (1–1)

Result	W–L	Date	Tournament	Tier	Surface	Partner	Opponents	Score
Loss	0–1	Mar 2021	ITF Amiens, France	W15	Clay (i)	(France) Elsa Jacquemot	(Australia) Seone Mendez (Mexico) María Portillo Ramírez	4–6, 3–6
Win	1–1	May 2022	Solgironès Open, Spain	W100+H	Clay	(Mexico) Renata Zarazúa	(United Kingdom) Alicia Barnett (United Kingdom) Olivia Nicholls	6–4, 2–6, [10–8]

== Junior finals ==
=== Grand Slam tournaments ===
==== Singles: 1 (title) ====
Result	Year	Tournament	Surface	Opponent	Score
Win	2020	Australian Open	Hard	(Poland) Weronika Baszak	5–7, 6–2, 6–2

=== ITF Junior Circuit ===
Legend
Category GA
Category G1
Category G2
Category G3
Category G4
Category G5

==== Singles: 10 (8–2) ====
Result	W–L	Date	Tournament	Grade	Surface	Opponent	Score
Win	1–0	Apr 2019	ITF Tarragona, Spain	G5	Clay	(Switzerland) Sebastianna Scilipoti	6–2, 6–7^{(5)}, 7–6^{(1)}
Win	2–0	Jul 2019	ITF Limelette, Belgium	G4	Clay	(Belgium) Amelia Waligora	6–4, 6–0
Win	3–0	Aug 2019	ITF Barcelona, Spain	G3	Clay	(Netherlands) Anouck Peeters	6–4, 3–6, 6–3
Win	4–0	Sep 2019	ITF El Prat de Llobregat, Spain	G3	Clay	(Slovakia) Vanda Vargova	4–6, 6–2, 6–0
Win	5–0	Nov 2019	ITF Saint-Cyprien, France	G3	Hard	(United Kingdom) Amelia Bissett	6–7^{(3)}, 6–1, 7–6^{(3)}
Win	6–0	Dec 2019	ITF Mérida, Mexico	GA	Hard	(Canada) Mélodie Collard	7–6^{(8)}, 6–2
Win	7–0	Oct 2020	ITF Plovdiv, Bulgaria	G1	Clay	(Belgium) Sofia Costoulas	6–2, 6–1
Loss	7–1	Nov 2020	ITF Villena, Spain	G1	Clay	(France) Elsa Jacquemot	1–6, 6–4, 6–7^{(8)}
Loss	7–2	Mar 2021	ITF Villena, Spain	G1	Clay	(Russia) Diana Shnaider	4–6, 3–6
Win	8–2	Jul 2022	ITF Klosters, Switzerland (European Championships)	GB1	Clay	(Switzerland) Céline Naef	6–2, 6–3

==== Doubles: 3 (1–2) ====
Result	W–L	Date	Tournament	Grade	Surface	Partner	Opponents	Score
Loss	0–1	Sep 2019	ITF Palermo, Italy	G3	Clay	(Germany) Tea Lukic	(Italy) Jennifer Ruggeri (Italy) Arianna Zucchini	6–3, 5–7, [2–10]
Win	1–1	Sep 2019	ITF El Prat de Llobregat, Spain	G3	Clay	(Spain) Fiona Arrese Mata	(Italy) Eleonora Alvisi (France) Flavie Brugnone	6–3, 6–4
Loss	1–2	Nov 2019	ITF Cancún, Mexico	G1	Hard	(Hungary) Amarissa Tóth	(Russia) Maria Bondarenko (Latvia) Darja Semenistaja	6–3, 0–6, [8–10]
