= ITF The Hague =

- 2024 ITF The Hague

ITF Women's Tour
- Event name: ITF The Hague
- Location: The Hague, Netherlands
- Venue: Rhijenhof
- Category: ITF Women's World Tennis Tour
- Surface: Clay
- Draw: 32S/32Q/16D
- Prize money: $60,000
- Website: Official website

The ITF The Hague is a tournament for professional female tennis players played on outdoor clay courts. The event is classified as a $60,000 ITF Women's World Tennis Tour tournament and has been held in The Hague, Netherlands, since 2018.

== Past finals ==
=== Singles ===
Year	Champion	Runner-up	Score
2026 (2)	(Netherlands) Eva Vedder	(Croatia) Lea Bošković	6–4, 6–3
2026	(Ukraine) Veronika Podrez	(Belgium) Clara Vlasselaer	6–3, 6–3
2025	(Ukraine) Oleksandra Oliynykova	(Italy) Jessica Pieri	6–1, 6–3
2024	(Netherlands) Arantxa Rus	(Poland) Gina Feistel	6–1, 4–6, 6–2
2023	(Netherlands) Arantxa Rus	(Czech Republic) Sára Bejlek	7–6^{(7–3)}, 6–4
2022	(Hungary) Natália Szabanin	(Belgium) Magali Kempen	7–6^{(7–3)}, 6–4
2021	(Netherlands) Quirine Lemoine	(Hungary) Panna Udvardy	7–5, 6–3
2020	Cancelled due to the COVID-19 pandemic		
2019	(Netherlands) Arantxa Rus	(Russia) Valentina Ivakhnenko	6–2, 6–2
2018	(Norway) Malene Helgø	(Sweden) Ida Jarlskog	6–4, 4–6, 6–3

=== Doubles ===
Year	Champions	Runners-up	Score
2026 (2)	(Netherlands) Britt du Pree (Netherlands) Sarah van Emst	(Italy) Nuria Brancaccio (Italy) Federica Urgesi	7–5, 6–3
2026	(Canada) Ariana Arseneault (Canada) Raphaëlle Lacasse	(New Zealand) Valentina Ivanov (Denmark) Rebecca Munk Mortensen	6–4, 3–6, [10–5]
2025	(Netherlands) Joy de Zeeuw (Netherlands) Arantxa Rus	Polina Bakhmutkina; Kristina Kroitor	6–2, 6–2
2024	(Australia) Jaimee Fourlis (Australia) Petra Hule	(Netherlands) Annelin Bakker (Netherlands) Sarah van Emst	6–4, 6–2
2023	(France) Kristina Mladenovic (Netherlands) Arantxa Rus	(Netherlands) Jasmijn Gimbrère (Netherlands) Isabelle Haverlag	6–4, 6–0
2022	(Netherlands) Jasmijn Gimbrère (Netherlands) Isabelle Haverlag	(United States) Nikki Redelijk (Netherlands) Bente Spee	6–2, 6–4
2021	(Belgium) Marie Benoît (Romania) Ioana Loredana Roșca	(Mexico) María Portillo Ramírez (Hungary) Panna Udvardy	6–7^{(5–7)}, 7–5, [10–7]
2020	Cancelled due to the COVID-19 pandemic		
2019	(Greece) Valentini Grammatikopoulou (Netherlands) Quirine Lemoine	(Australia) Gabriella Da Silva-Fick (Germany) Anna Klasen	6–2, 5–7, [10–3]
2018	(United Kingdom) Emily Appleton (Sweden) Ida Jarlskog	(United States) Dasha Ivanova (Germany) Julyette Steur	6–4, 6–0
