= 2022 Open Araba en Femenino – Singles =

Singles
- 2022 Open Araba en Femenino

Final
- Champion: (France) Jessika Ponchet
- Runner-up: (Switzerland) Jenny Dürst
- Score: 6–4, 7–5

Events
Singles	Doubles
← 2021 ·	Open Araba en Femenino	· 2023 →

Rebeka Masarova was the defending champion but chose to compete at the 2022 Internazionali Femminili di Palermo instead.

Jessika Ponchet won the title, defeating Jenny Dürst in the final, 6–4, 7–5.

== Seeds ==
1. (China) Zhu Lin (second round)
2. (Spain) Cristina Bucșa (first round)
3. (France) Jessika Ponchet (champion)
4. (Australia) Lizette Cabrera (first round)
5. (Switzerland) Susan Bandecchi (quarterfinals, retired)
6. (Lithuania) Justina Mikulskytė (second round)
7. (United States) Danielle Lao (second round)
8. (Switzerland) Lulu Sun (first round)

== Draw ==
=== Key ===
- Q = Qualifier
- WC = Wild card
- LL = Lucky loser
- Alt = Alternate
- SE = Special exempt
- PR = Protected ranking
- ITF = ITF entry
- JE = Junior exempt
- w/o = Walkover
- r = Retired
- d = Defaulted
- SR = Special ranking

=== Finals ===
Semifinals
(Spain) Eva Guerrero Álvarez	5	5
Q	(Switzerland) Jenny Dürst	7	7
3	(France) Jessika Ponchet	6	6
(Philippines) Alex Eala	4	4

Final
Q	(Switzerland) Jenny Dürst	4	5
3	(France) Jessika Ponchet	6	7

=== Top half ===
First round
1	(China) L Zhu	6	6
(Hong Kong) A Karunaratne	4	4
(Spain) E Guerrero Álvarez	7	6
(Colombia) M Herazo González	5	1
WC	(Spain) C Gómez	6	6
Q	(Slovakia) S Milatová	3	1
Q	(Spain) C Cerviño Ruiz	6^{4}	5
5	(Switzerland) S Bandecchi	7^{7}	7
4	(Australia) L Cabrera	6	3	4
Q	(Switzerland) J Dürst	3	6	6
(Denmark) O Helmi	2	6	6
Q	(Czech Republic) L Pulchartová	6	2	3
Q	(Hungary) A Nagy	6	5	6
(Latvia) D Marcinkēviča	3	7	4
Q	(France) F Brugnone	6	4	4
7	(United States) D Lao	3	6	6

Second round
1	(China) L Zhu	6	4	3
(Spain) E Guerrero Álvarez	2	6	6
WC	(Spain) C Gómez	1	6^{1}
5	(Switzerland) S Bandecchi	6	7^{7}
Q	(Switzerland) J Dürst	6	6
(Denmark) O Helmi	3	1
Q	(Hungary) A Nagy	5	6	6
7	(United States) D Lao	7	4	2

Quarterfinals
(Spain) E Guerrero Álvarez	3
5	(Switzerland) S Bandecchi	2^{r}
Q	(Switzerland) J Dürst	6	6
Q	(Hungary) A Nagy	2	3

Semifinals
(Spain) E Guerrero Álvarez	5	5
Q	(Switzerland) J Dürst	7	7

=== Bottom half ===
First round
6	(Lithuania) J Mikulskytė	5	6	2
Q	(Italy) V Meliss	7	2	0^{r}
(Chinese Taipei) E-s Liang	6	6
A Charaeva	2	0
Q	(South Korea) Y-w Ku	6	7
(Romania) IL Roșca	1	5
M Bondarenko	1	2
3	(France) J Ponchet	6	6
8	(Switzerland) L Sun	7	4	3
(Chinese Taipei) Y-h Lee	5	6	6
(Philippines) A Eala	6	6
WC	(Spain) B Gutiérrez Saiz	1	2
WC	(Spain) L Cortez Llorca	7	6
WC	(Spain) C Hoste Ferrer	5	4
(United Kingdom) E Silva	2	6	6
2	(Spain) C Bucșa	6	4	4

Second round
6	(Lithuania) J Mikulskytė	6^{2}	4
(Chinese Taipei) E-s Liang	7^{7}	6
Q	(South Korea) Y-w Ku	1	1
3	(France) J Ponchet	6	6
(Chinese Taipei) Y-h Lee	6	4	1^{r}
(Philippines) A Eala	1	6	4
WC	(Spain) L Cortez Llorca	2	3
(United Kingdom) E Silva	6	6

Quarterfinals
(Chinese Taipei) E-s Liang	2	7^{7}	3
3	(France) J Ponchet	6	6^{5}	6
(Philippines) A Eala	6	6
(United Kingdom) E Silva	1	1

Semifinals
3	(France) J Ponchet	6	6
(Philippines) A Eala	4	4
