= 2022 Open Araba en Femenino – Doubles =

Doubles
- 2022 Open Araba en Femenino

Final
- Champions: Maria Bondarenko (Romania) Ioana Loredana Roșca
- Runners-up: (Netherlands) Isabelle Haverlag (Lithuania) Justina Mikulskytė
- Score: 4–6, 6–4, [11–9]

Events
Singles	Doubles
← 2021 ·	Open Araba en Femenino	· 2023 →

Olivia Gadecki and Rebeka Masarova were the defending champions but chose not to participate.

Maria Bondarenko and Ioana Loredana Roșca won the title, defeating Isabelle Haverlag and Justina Mikulskytė in the final, 4–6, 6–4, [11–9].

== Seeds ==
1. (Switzerland) Susan Bandecchi / (United Kingdom) Eden Silva (quarterfinals)
2. (Spain) Cristina Bucșa / (Colombia) María Herazo González (first round)
3. (Netherlands) Isabelle Haverlag / (Lithuania) Justina Mikulskytė (final)
4. (Chinese Taipei) Liang En-shuo / (China) Zhu Lin (semifinals)

== Draw ==
=== Key ===
- Q = Qualifier
- WC = Wild card
- LL = Lucky loser
- Alt = Alternate
- SE = Special exempt
- PR = Protected ranking
- ITF = ITF entry
- JE = Junior exempt
- w/o = Walkover
- r = Retired
- d = Defaulted
- SR = Special ranking

=== Draw ===
First round
1	(Switzerland) S Bandecchi (United Kingdom) E Silva	6	6
WC	(Spain) AM Fernández del Moral Perier (Denmark) DD Nweke	1	1
(France) F Brugnone (Spain) E Guerrero Álvarez	4	2
(Japan) M Ayukawa (Switzerland) J Dürst	6	6
3	(Netherlands) I Haverlag (Lithuania) J Mikulskytė	6	6
(United Kingdom) A Collins (Hungary) A Nagy	3	3
WC	(Spain) M García Elvira (Ukraine) K Novikova	0	1
(Spain) C Cerviño Ruiz (Italy) N Fossa Huergo	6	6
(Italy) V Meliss (Slovakia) S Milatová	6	5	[10]
(Germany) J Jebawy (Latvia) D Marcinkēviča	1	7	[5]
(Czech Republic) L Pulchartová (Japan) H Sato	1	6	[6]
4	(Chinese Taipei) E-s Liang (China) L Zhu	6	3	[10]
(Denmark) O Gram (United States) E Oosterhout	6	6^{6}	[10]
WC	(Spain) C Gómez (Spain) B Gutiérrez Saiz	1	7^{8}	[4]
M Bondarenko (Romania) IL Roșca	6	6
2	(Spain) C Bucșa (Colombia) M Herazo González	4	0

Quarterfinals
1	(Switzerland) S Bandecchi (United Kingdom) E Silva	3	5
(Japan) M Ayukawa (Switzerland) J Dürst	6	7
3	(Netherlands) I Haverlag (Lithuania) J Mikulskytė	6	3	[10]
(Spain) C Cerviño Ruiz (Italy) N Fossa Huergo	3	6	[8]
(Italy) V Meliss (Slovakia) S Milatová	2	1
4	(Chinese Taipei) E-s Liang (China) L Zhu	6	6
(Denmark) O Gram (United States) E Oosterhout
M Bondarenko (Romania) IL Roșca	w/o

Semifinals
(Japan) M Ayukawa (Switzerland) J Dürst	6	2	[3]
3	(Netherlands) I Haverlag (Lithuania) J Mikulskytė	3	6	[10]
4	(Chinese Taipei) E-s Liang (China) L Zhu	4	6	[7]
M Bondarenko (Romania) IL Roșca	6	3	[10]

Final
3	(Netherlands) I Haverlag (Lithuania) J Mikulskytė	6	4	[9]
M Bondarenko (Romania) IL Roșca	4	6	[11]
