= 2023 Open Araba en Femenino – Doubles =

Doubles
- 2023 Open Araba en Femenino

Final
- Champions: (United Kingdom) Alicia Barnett (United Kingdom) Olivia Nicholls
- Runners-up: (France) Estelle Cascino (Latvia) Diāna Marcinkēviča
- Score: 6–3, 6–4

Events
Singles	Doubles
← 2022 ·	Open Araba en Femenino	· 2024 →

Maria Bondarenko and Ioana Loredana Roșca were the defending champions but chose not to participate.

== Seeds ==
1. (United Kingdom) Alicia Barnett / (United Kingdom) Olivia Nicholls (champions)
2. (India) Ankita Raina / (India) Prarthana Thombare (first round)
3. (Thailand) Luksika Kumkhum / (Thailand) Peangtarn Plipuech (semifinals)
4. (Netherlands) Isabelle Haverlag / (United States) Sofia Sewing (first round)

== Draw ==
=== Key ===
- Q = Qualifier
- WC = Wild card
- LL = Lucky loser
- Alt = Alternate
- SE = Special exempt
- PR = Protected ranking
- ITF = ITF entry
- JE = Junior exempt
- w/o = Walkover
- r = Retired
- d = Defaulted
- SR = Special ranking

=== Draw ===
First round
1	(United Kingdom) A Barnett (United Kingdom) O Nicholls	6	6
(India) V Shinde (Bolivia) N Zeballos	0	3
WC	(Spain) C Gómez (Spain) J Gómez	4	1
(Spain) G García Pérez (Serbia) A Krunić	6	6
4	(Netherlands) I Haverlag (United States) S Sewing	4	6	[8]
WC	(Bulgaria) L Karatancheva (Bulgaria) S Karatantcheva	6	2	[10]
(Ukraine) M Kostiuk (Chile) J Verdugo	6^{5}	0
(Italy) V Meliss (Slovakia) S Milatová	7^{7}	6
(Poland) G Feistel (United Kingdom) E Lindh	6	6
(Spain) L Cortez Llorca (Spain) J Perelló Saavedra	1	3
(Spain) M Aristegui (United States) R Newborn	3	2
3	(Thailand) L Kumkhum (Thailand) P Plipuech	6	6
WC	(Spain) AM Fernández del Moral Perier (Spain) P Rodríguez Carretero	2	2
(France) E Cascino (Latvia) D Marcinkēviča	6	6
(Spain) M Bassols Ribera (Philippines) A Eala	6	6
2	(India) A Raina (India) P Thombare	2	2

Quarterfinals
1	(United Kingdom) A Barnett (United Kingdom) O Nicholls	w/o
(Spain) G García Pérez (Serbia) A Krunić
WC	(Bulgaria) L Karatancheva (Bulgaria) S Karatantcheva	w/o
(Italy) V Meliss (Slovakia) S Milatová
(Poland) G Feistel (United Kingdom) E Lindh	3	6^{6}
3	(Thailand) L Kumkhum (Thailand) P Plipuech	6	7^{8}
(France) E Cascino (Latvia) D Marcinkēviča	7	1	[11]
(Spain) M Bassols Ribera (Philippines) A Eala	5	6	[9]

Semifinals
1	(United Kingdom) A Barnett (United Kingdom) O Nicholls	6	6
WC	(Bulgaria) L Karatancheva (Bulgaria) S Karatantcheva	1	2
3	(Thailand) L Kumkhum (Thailand) P Plipuech	5	6	[6]
(France) E Cascino (Latvia) D Marcinkēviča	7	2	[10]

Final
1	(United Kingdom) A Barnett (United Kingdom) O Nicholls	6	6
(France) E Cascino (Latvia) D Marcinkēviča	3	4
