= 2024 Open Araba en Femenino – Singles =

Singles
- 2024 Open Araba en Femenino

Final
- Champion: (Philippines) Alex Eala
- Runner-up: (Andorra) Victoria Jiménez Kasintseva
- Score: 6–4, 6–4

Events
Singles	Doubles
- Open Araba en Femenino

The 2024 Open Araba en Femenino – Singles was a women's professional tennis tournament played on outdoor hard courts in Vitoria-Gasteiz, Spain. It was part of the 2024 ITF Women's World Tennis Tour, classified as a W100 event with US$100,000 in prize money, and was held from 15 to 21 July 2024 as the singles competition of the Open Araba en Femenino.

Daria Snigur was the defending champion, but retired from her first-round match against María Portillo Ramírez.

Alex Eala won the title, defeating Victoria Jiménez Kasintseva in the final, 6–4, 6–4. It was Eala's first ITF singles title at the W100 level, following earlier titles at the W15 and W25 tiers, and she also won the doubles event at the tournament alongside Estelle Cascino.

== Seeds ==
1. (Ukraine) Daria Snigur (first round, retired)
2. (France) Jessika Ponchet (semifinals)
3. (Czech Republic) Linda Fruhvirtová (quarterfinals)
4. (Ukraine) Yuliia Starodubtseva (quarterfinals)
5. (Philippines) Alex Eala (champion)
6. (Serbia) Natalija Stevanović (second round)
7. (Andorra) Victoria Jiménez Kasintseva (final)
8. (Lithuania) Justina Mikulskytė (quarterfinals)

== Draw ==
Key

- Q = Qualifier
- WC = Wild card
- LL = Lucky loser
- Alt = Alternate
- ITF = ITF entry
- PR = Protected ranking
- SR = Special ranking
- SE = Special exempt
- JE = Junior exempt
- JR = Junior Accelerator Programme entrant
- CO = College Accelerator Programme entrant
- NG = Next Gen Accelerator Program entrant
- w/o = Walkover
- r = Retired
- d = Defaulted

=== Finals ===
Semifinals
(Mexico) María Portillo Ramírez	2	1
5	(Philippines) Alex Eala	6	6
7	(Andorra) Victoria Jiménez Kasintseva	6	6
2	(France) Jessika Ponchet	2	2

Final
5	(Philippines) Alex Eala	6	6
7	(Andorra) Victoria Jiménez Kasintseva	4	4

=== Top half ===
First round
1	(Ukraine) D Snigur	5^{r}
(Mexico) M Portillo Ramírez	6
WC	(Spain) C Gómez	6	3	6
(Israel) L Glushko	1	6	4
(France) N Berecoechea	6	3	1
(Australia) M Ercan	4	6	6
A Gureva	6^{5}	5
6	(Serbia) N Stevanović	7^{7}	7
4	(Ukraine) Y Starodubtseva	6	6
(Bulgaria) L Karatancheva	4	2
Q	(Denmark) E Jamshidi	1	2
(Belgium) M Kempen	6	6
Q	(Turkey) P Özgen	2	1
(Spain) L Cortez Llorca	6	6
Q	(Netherlands) L Tran	4	2
5	(Philippines) A Eala	6	6

Second round
(Mexico) M Portillo Ramírez	7	6
WC	(Spain) C Gómez	5	1
(Australia) M Ercan	6	6
6	(Serbia) N Stevanović	3	3
4	(Ukraine) Y Starodubtseva	6	6
(Belgium) M Kempen	3	2
(Spain) L Cortez Llorca	5	5
5	(Philippines) A Eala	7	7

Quarterfinals
(Mexico) M Portillo Ramírez	2	7	7^{7}
(Australia) M Ercan	6	5	6^{5}
4	(Ukraine) Y Starodubtseva	6^{5}	4
5	(Philippines) A Eala	7^{7}	6

Semifinals
(Mexico) M Portillo Ramírez	2	1
5	(Philippines) A Eala	6	6

=== Bottom half ===
First round
7	(Andorra) V Jiménez Kasintseva	6	6
(Latvia) D Marcinkēviča	1	0
Q	(Italy) V Meliss	1	6	7^{9}
Q	(Spain) M Martínez Vaquero	6	4	6^{7}
(India) R Bhosale	6	3	6
WC	(Spain) M Aristegui	3	6	2
Q	(Belgium) L Salden	3	5
3	(Czech Republic) L Fruhvirtová	6	7
8	(Lithuania) J Mikulskytė	6	6
Q	(France) E Cascino	1	1
(Ukraine) V Strakhova	6	4	6
WC	(Spain) C López Martínez	2	6	3
PR	(Kazakhstan) Z Diyas	6	6
WC	(Spain) C Gay	4	2
Q	(Italy) L Mair	5	1
2	(France) J Ponchet	7	6

Second round
7	(Andorra) V Jiménez Kasintseva	6	6
Q	(Italy) V Meliss	3	3
(India) R Bhosale	6	6^{6}	3
3	(Czech Republic) L Fruhvirtová	2	7^{8}	6
8	(Lithuania) J Mikulskytė	7	6
(Ukraine) V Strakhova	5	1
PR	(Kazakhstan) Z Diyas	1	4
2	(France) J Ponchet	6	6

Quarterfinals
7	(Andorra) V Jiménez Kasintseva	6	2	6
3	(Czech Republic) L Fruhvirtová	2	6	4
8	(Lithuania) J Mikulskytė	4	5
2	(France) J Ponchet	6	7

Semifinals
7	(Andorra) V Jiménez Kasintseva	6	6
2	(France) J Ponchet	2	2
