= 2023 Open Araba en Femenino =

Tennis tournament

- Date: 17–23 July 2023
- Edition: 4th
- Category: ITF Women's World Tennis Tour
- Prize money: $100,000
- Surface: Hard / Outdoor
- Location: Vitoria-Gasteiz, Spain

Champions

Singles
- (Ukraine) Daria Snigur

Doubles
- (United Kingdom) Alicia Barnett (United Kingdom) Olivia Nicholls
- Open Araba en Femenino

The 2023 Open Araba en Femenino was a professional tennis tournament played on outdoor hard courts. It was the fourth edition of the tournament which was part of the 2023 ITF Women's World Tennis Tour. It took place in Vitoria-Gasteiz, Spain between 17 and 23 July 2023.

== Champions ==
=== Singles ===
- (Ukraine) Daria Snigur def. (France) Jessika Ponchet, 3–6, 6–4, 6–1.

=== Doubles ===
- (United Kingdom) Alicia Barnett / (United Kingdom) Olivia Nicholls def. (France) Estelle Cascino / (Latvia) Diāna Marcinkēviča, 6–3, 6–4.

== Singles main draw entrants ==
=== Seeds ===
Country	Player	Rank^{1}	Seed
GBR	Jodie Burrage	108	1
FRA	Océane Dodin	113	2
FRA	Jessika Ponchet	130	3
ESP	Marina Bassols Ribera	131	4
ROU	Jaqueline Cristian	133	5
UKR	Daria Snigur	151	6
CHN	Bai Zhuoxuan	191	7
IND	Ankita Raina	197	8

- ^{1} Rankings are as of 3 July 2023.

=== Other entrants ===
The following players received wildcards into the singles main draw:

- (Spain) Mercedes Aristegui
- (Spain) Lucía Llinares Domingo
- (Spain) Carolina Gómez
- (Spain) Judith Perelló Saavedra

The following player received entry into the singles main draw using a special ranking:

- (Bulgaria) Sesil Karatantcheva

The following players received entry from the qualifying draw:

- (France) Nahia Berecoechea
- (Poland) Gina Feistel
- (Bulgaria) Lia Karatancheva
- (United Kingdom) Emilie Lindh
- (China) Mi Tianmi
- (Slovakia) Sofia Milatová
- (Serbia) Elena Milovanović
- (Switzerland) Sebastianna Scilipoti

The following player received entry as a lucky loser:

- (Bolivia) Noelia Zeballos
