= 2021 Internationaux Féminins de la Vienne – Singles =

Singles
- 2021 Internationaux Féminins de la Vienne

Final
- Champion: (France) Chloé Paquet
- Runner-up: (Switzerland) Simona Waltert
- Score: 6–4, 6–3

Events
Singles	Doubles
← 2019 ·	Internationaux Féminins de la Vienne	· 2022 →

Nina Stojanović was the defending champion but chose to compete at the 2021 Torneig Internacional Els Gorchs instead.

Chloé Paquet won the title, defeating Simona Waltert in the final, 6–4, 6–3.

== Seeds ==
1. (France) Océane Dodin (quarterfinals)
2. (France) Harmony Tan (semifinals, retired)
3. (Hungary) Tímea Babos (first round)
4. (France) Chloé Paquet (champion)
5. (France) Amandine Hesse (second round, retired)
6. (Georgia (country)) Mariam Bolkvadze (quarterfinals)
7. (Ukraine) Daria Snigur (second round)
8. (Austria) Julia Grabher (first round)

== Draw ==
=== Key ===
- Q = Qualifier
- WC = Wild card
- LL = Lucky loser
- Alt = Alternate
- SE = Special exempt
- PR = Protected ranking
- ITF = ITF entry
- JE = Junior exempt
- w/o = Walkover
- r = Retired
- d = Defaulted
- SR = Special ranking

=== Finals ===
Semifinals
(France) Elsa Jacquemot	3	4
(Switzerland) Simona Waltert	6	6
4	(France) Chloé Paquet	4	6	3
2	(France) Harmony Tan	6	4	2^{r}

Final
(Switzerland) Simona Waltert	4	3
4	(France) Chloé Paquet	6	6

=== Top half ===
First round
1	(France) O Dodin	4	6	6
Q	(United Kingdom) SB Grey	6	2	2
(Netherlands) A Hartono	3	6	6
(North Macedonia) L Gjorcheska	6	3	3
WC	(France) É Dartron	5	7^{10}	5
Q	(United Kingdom) A Barnett	7	6^{8}	7
(France) E Jacquemot	5	6	6
8	(Austria) J Grabher	7	3	4
3	(Hungary) T Babos	1	6^{4}
Q	(France) A Albié	6	7^{7}
(Liechtenstein) K von Deichmann	1	6	6
(Norway) M Helgø	6	2	3
(Switzerland) S Waltert	6	6
WC	(France) K Marthiens	0	1
Q	(France) M Noël	1	3
5	(France) A Hesse	6	6

Second round
1	(France) O Dodin	6	6
(Netherlands) A Hartono	2	3
Q	(United Kingdom) A Barnett	4	4
(France) E Jacquemot	6	6
Q	(France) A Albié	2	6	4
(Liechtenstein) K von Deichmann	6	3	6
(Switzerland) S Waltert	6	4
5	(France) A Hesse	1	0^{r}

Quarterfinals
1	(France) O Dodin	2	3
(France) E Jacquemot	6	6
(Liechtenstein) K von Deichmann	4	7	3
(Switzerland) S Waltert	6	5	6

Semifinals
(France) E Jacquemot	3	4
(Switzerland) S Waltert	6	6

=== Bottom half ===
First round
6	(Georgia (country)) M Bolkvadze	6	6
WC	(France) L Jeanjean	1	4
(France) J Ponchet	6	6
(Burundi) S Nahimana	1	3
Q	(France) A Monnot	0	6	3
Q	(France) A Robbe	6	4	6
(United Kingdom) S Murray Sharan	2	3
4	(France) C Paquet	6	6
7	(Ukraine) D Snigur	6	6
(Italy) B Turati	2	3
(Cyprus) R Șerban	6	5	6
Q	(France) V Muntean	0	7	4
Q	(India) K Thandi	5	5
WC	(France) E Cascino	7	7
(Belgium) L Salden	4	2
2	(France) H Tan	6	6

Second round
6	(Georgia (country)) M Bolkvadze	3	7^{8}	6
(France) J Ponchet	6	6^{6}	2
Q	(France) A Robbe	1	1
4	(France) C Paquet	6	6
7	(Ukraine) D Snigur	1	6	2
(Cyprus) R Șerban	6	2	6
WC	(France) E Cascino	5	3
2	(France) H Tan	7	6

Quarterfinals
6	(Georgia (country)) M Bolkvadze	3	6	3
4	(France) C Paquet	6	3	6
(Cyprus) R Șerban	3	0
2	(France) H Tan	6	6

Semifinals
4	(France) C Paquet	4	6	3
2	(France) H Tan	6	4	2^{r}
