= 2023 Open Araba en Femenino – Singles =

Singles
- 2023 Open Araba en Femenino

Final
- Champion: (Ukraine) Daria Snigur
- Runner-up: (France) Jessika Ponchet
- Score: 3–6, 6–4, 6–1

Events
Singles	Doubles
← 2022 ·	Open Araba en Femenino	· 2024 →

Daria Snigur defeated defending champion Jessika Ponchet in the final, 3–6, 6–4, 6–1.

== Seeds ==
1. (United Kingdom) Jodie Burrage (quarterfinals)
2. (France) Océane Dodin (second round)
3. (France) Jessika Ponchet (final)
4. (Spain) Marina Bassols Ribera (quarterfinals)
5. (Romania) Jaqueline Cristian (first round)
6. (Ukraine) Daria Snigur (champion)
7. (China) Bai Zhuoxuan (semifinals)
8. (India) Ankita Raina (second round)

== Draw ==
=== Key ===
- Q = Qualifier
- WC = Wild card
- LL = Lucky loser
- Alt = Alternate
- SE = Special exempt
- PR = Protected ranking
- ITF = ITF entry
- JE = Junior exempt
- w/o = Walkover
- r = Retired
- d = Defaulted
- SR = Special ranking

=== Finals ===
Semifinals
7	(China) Bai Zhuoxuan	3	3
6	(Ukraine) Daria Snigur	6	6
3	(France) Jessika Ponchet	2	6	6
(Philippines) Alex Eala	6	4	2

Final
6	(Ukraine) Daria Snigur	3	6	6
3	(France) Jessika Ponchet	6	4	1

=== Top half ===
First round
1	(United Kingdom) J Burrage	6	6
Q	(United Kingdom) E Lindh	1	3
(Spain) E Guerrero Álvarez	6	6
(Latvia) D Marcinkēviča	2	4
(Finland) A Kulikova	6	6
WC	(Spain) J Perelló Saavedra	3	0
(Thailand) P Plipuech	3	2
7	(China) Z Bai	6	6
4	(Spain) M Bassols Ribera	6	6
SR	(Bulgaria) S Karatantcheva	3	1
(Serbia) A Krunić	2	1
Q	(Bulgaria) L Karatancheva	6	6
(Spain) G García Pérez	3	6	6
(Thailand) L Kumkhum	6	3	4
Q	(Switzerland) S Scilipoti	1	3
6	(Ukraine) D Snigur	6	6

Second round
1	(United Kingdom) J Burrage	7	6
(Spain) E Guerrero Álvarez	5	4
(Finland) A Kulikova	6	6^{2}	3
7	(China) Z Bai	2	7^{7}	6
4	(Spain) M Bassols Ribera	6	6
Q	(Bulgaria) L Karatancheva	2	2
(Spain) G García Pérez	3	6^{4}
6	(Ukraine) D Snigur	6	7^{7}

Quarterfinals
1	(United Kingdom) J Burrage	4	2
7	(China) Z Bai	6	6
4	(Spain) M Bassols Ribera	1	3
6	(Ukraine) D Snigur	6	6

Semifinals
7	(China) Z Bai	3	3
6	(Ukraine) D Snigur	6	6

=== Bottom half ===
First round
8	(India) A Raina	6	6
WC	(Spain) C Gómez	1	2
V Savinykh	3	6	6
LL	(Bolivia) N Zeballos	6	2	0
Q	(France) N Berecoechea	7^{7}	6
Q	(Slovakia) S Milatová	6^{3}	2
Q	(Serbia) E Milovanović	1	0
3	(France) J Ponchet	6	6
5	(Romania) J Cristian	6^{5}	7^{7}	2
(Philippines) A Eala	7^{7}	6^{1}	6
Q	(Poland) G Feistel	5	6	4
Q	(China) T Mi	7	2	6
(Spain) L Cortez Llorca	6	6
WC	(Spain) L Llinares Domingo	4	2
WC	(Spain) M Aristegui	1	7	2
2	(France) O Dodin	6	5	6

Second round
8	(India) A Raina	7^{8}	3	4
V Savinykh	6^{6}	6	6
Q	(France) N Berecoechea	6^{6}	2
3	(France) J Ponchet	7^{8}	6
(Philippines) A Eala	6	6^{5}	6
Q	(China) T Mi	3	7^{7}	0
(Spain) L Cortez Llorca	6	6
2	(France) O Dodin	2	4

Quarterfinals
V Savinykh	4	7^{7}	0
3	(France) J Ponchet	6	6^{4}	6
(Philippines) A Eala	6	4	6
(Spain) L Cortez Llorca	2	6	2

Semifinals
3	(France) J Ponchet	2	6	6
(Philippines) A Eala	6	4	2
