= 2024 ITF The Hague =

Tennis tournament

- Date: 8–14 July 2024
- Edition: 6th
- Category: ITF Women's World Tennis Tour
- Prize money: $60,000
- Surface: Clay / Outdoor
- Location: The Hague, Netherlands

Champions

Singles
- (Netherlands) Arantxa Rus

Doubles
- (Australia) Jaimee Fourlis / (Australia) Petra Hule
← 2023 ·	ITF The Hague	· 2025 →

The 2024 ITF The Hague was a professional tennis tournament played on outdoor clay courts. It was the sixth edition of the tournament, which was part of the 2024 ITF Women's World Tennis Tour. It took place in The Hague, Netherlands, between 8 and 14 July 2024.

== Champions ==
=== Singles ===
- (Netherlands) Arantxa Rus def. (Poland) Gina Feistel, 6–1, 4–6, 6–2

=== Doubles ===
- (Australia) Jaimee Fourlis / (Australia) Petra Hule def. (Netherlands) Annelin Bakker / (Netherlands) Sarah van Emst, 6–4, 6–2

== Singles main draw entrants ==
=== Seeds ===
Country	Player	Rank	Seed
NED	Arantxa Rus	56	1
CZE	Dominika Šalková	149	2
ARG	Martina Capurro Taborda	185	3
CYP	Raluca Șerban	205	4
KOR	Jang Su-jeong	217	5
BUL	Gergana Topalova	233	6
BUL	Isabella Shinikova	247	7
SRB	Dejana Radanović	251	8

- Rankings are as of 1 July 2024.

=== Other entrants ===
The following players received wildcards into the singles main draw:

- (Netherlands) Annelin Bakker
- (Netherlands) Loes Ebeling Koning
- (Netherlands) Sarah van Emst
- (Netherlands) Eva Vedder

The following player received entry into the singles main draw using a special ranking:

- (Germany) Nastasja Schunk

The following players received entry into the singles main draw as special exempts:

- (Spain) Lucía Cortez Llorca
- (Australia) Jaimee Fourlis

The following players received entry from the qualifying draw:

- (Turkey) Çağla Büyükakçay
- (Poland) Gina Feistel
- (Georgia (country)) Ekaterine Gorgodze
- (Australia) Petra Hule
- (Greece) Michaela Laki
- (Germany) Yana Morderger
- (Germany) Antonia Schmidt
- (Netherlands) Lian Tran

The following players received entry into the singles main draw as lucky losers:

- (Germany) Mina Hodzic
- (Mexico) María Portillo Ramírez
