= 2024 ITF The Hague – Doubles =

Doubles
- 2024 ITF The Hague

Final
- Champions: (Australia) Jaimee Fourlis (Australia) Petra Hule
- Runners-up: (Netherlands) Annelin Bakker (Netherlands) Sarah van Emst
- Score: 6–4, 6–2

Events
Singles	Doubles
← 2023 ·	ITF The Hague	· 2025 →

Kristina Mladenovic and Arantxa Rus were the defending champions but Mladenovic chose not to participate. Rus partners alongside María Portillo Ramírez, but lost in the semifinals to Jaimee Fourlis and Petra Hule.

Fourlis and Hule went on to win the title, defeating Annelin Bakker and Sarah van Emst in the final; 6–4, 6–2.

== Seeds ==
1. (Georgia (country)) Ekaterine Gorgodze / (Ukraine) Valeriya Strakhova (quarterfinals)
2. (Netherlands) Isabelle Haverlag / (Netherlands) Eva Vedder (quarterfinals)
3. (Mexico) María Portillo Ramírez / (Netherlands) Arantxa Rus (semifinals)
4. (Australia) Alexandra Osborne / (Bulgaria) Isabella Shinikova (semifinals, withdrew)

== Draw ==
=== Key ===
- Q = Qualifier
- WC = Wild card
- LL = Lucky loser
- Alt = Alternate
- SE = Special exempt
- PR = Protected ranking
- ITF = ITF entry
- JE = Junior exempt
- w/o = Walkover
- r = Retired
- d = Defaulted
- SR = Special ranking

First round
1	(Georgia (country)) E Gorgodze (Ukraine) V Strakhova	w/o
(Belgium) Y Bonaventure (Netherlands) L Pattinama Kerkhove
(Netherlands) M Hoedt (Netherlands) M Krajicek	4	1
(Australia) J Fourlis (Australia) P Hule	6	6
3	(Mexico) M Portillo Ramírez (Netherlands) A Rus	6	6
(Germany) L Böhner (Netherlands) L Tran	2	3
(Azerbaijan) M Dzjachangirova (Curaçao) SVM Nita	2	3
(Netherlands) R de Koning (Belgium) T Di Girolami	6	6
(Netherlands) L Ebeling Koning (Netherlands) IL van den Broek	6	6
(Netherlands) E van Poppel (Netherlands) K Veldman	3	3
(Netherlands) E de Mooij (Germany) V Sandberg	6	3	[8]
4	(Australia) A Osborne (Bulgaria) I Shinikova	4	6	[10]
(Germany) T Morderger (Germany) Y Morderger	2	2
(Netherlands) A Bakker (Netherlands) S van Emst	6	6
(Netherlands) B Burgersdijk (Netherlands) E Pool	2	0
2	(Netherlands) I Haverlag (Netherlands) E Vedder	6	6

Quarterfinals
1	(Georgia (country)) E Gorgodze (Ukraine) V Strakhova	6	5	[7]
(Australia) J Fourlis (Australia) P Hule	2	7	[10]
3	(Mexico) M Portillo Ramírez (Netherlands) A Rus	6	6
(Netherlands) R de Koning (Belgium) T Di Girolami	3	3
(Netherlands) L Ebeling Koning (Netherlands) IL van den Broek	1	6	[8]
4	(Australia) A Osborne (Bulgaria) I Shinikova	6	2	[10]
(Netherlands) A Bakker (Netherlands) S van Emst	7	7
2	(Netherlands) I Haverlag (Netherlands) E Vedder	5	5

Semifinals
(Australia) J Fourlis (Australia) P Hule	6	7
3	(Mexico) M Portillo Ramírez (Netherlands) A Rus	4	5
4	(Australia) A Osborne (Bulgaria) I Shinikova
(Netherlands) A Bakker (Netherlands) S van Emst	w/o

Final
(Australia) J Fourlis (Australia) P Hule	6	6
(Netherlands) A Bakker (Netherlands) S van Emst	4	2
