= 2021 Internationaux Féminins de la Vienne – Doubles =

Doubles
- 2021 Internationaux Féminins de la Vienne

Final
- Champions: (Georgia (country)) Mariam Bolkvadze (United Kingdom) Samantha Murray Sharan
- Runners-up: (France) Audrey Albié (France) Léolia Jeanjean
- Score: 7–6^{(7–5)}, 6–0

Events
Singles	Doubles
← 2019 ·	Internationaux Féminins de la Vienne	· 2022 →

Amandine Hesse and Harmony Tan were the defending champions but Tan chose not to participate. Hesse partnered alongside Jessika Ponchet, but lost in the first round to Flavie Brugnone and Lucie Wargnier.

Mariam Bolkvadze and Samantha Murray Sharan won the title, defeating Audrey Albié and Léolia Jeanjean in the final, 7–6^{(7–5)}, 6–0.

== Seeds ==
1. (France) Amandine Hesse / (France) Jessika Ponchet (first round)
2. (France) Estelle Cascino / (Italy) Camilla Rosatello (quarterfinals)
3. (United Kingdom) Sarah Beth Grey / (Netherlands) Arianne Hartono (first round)
4. (United Kingdom) Alicia Barnett / (United Kingdom) Olivia Nicholls (semifinals)

== Draw ==
=== Key ===
- Q = Qualifier
- WC = Wild card
- LL = Lucky loser
- Alt = Alternate
- SE = Special exempt
- PR = Protected ranking
- ITF = ITF entry
- JE = Junior exempt
- w/o = Walkover
- r = Retired
- d = Defaulted
- SR = Special ranking

=== Draw ===
First round
1	(France) A Hesse (France) J Ponchet	3	6	[5]
(France) F Brugnone (France) L Wargnier	6	1	[10]
(Austria) J Grabher (Switzerland) S Waltert	2	6^{10}
(Belgium) L Salden (India) P Thombare	6	7^{12}
3	(United Kingdom) SB Grey (Netherlands) A Hartono	3	7^{8}	[8]
(France) A Albié (France) L Jeanjean	6	6^{6}	[10]
(Romania) K Bejenaru (France) V Muntean	6	6
(France) E Mazzoni (France) J Mazzoni	0	1
(Netherlands) I Haverlag (France) A Robbe	6	6
(Austria) T Paszek (Netherlands) L Stevens	2	4
(France) E Jacquemot (Burundi) S Nahimana	2	1
4	(United Kingdom) A Barnett (United Kingdom) O Nicholls	6	6
(Germany) A Gabric (Romania) A Vasilescu	2	7^{7}	[6]
(Georgia (country)) M Bolkvadze (United Kingdom) S Murray Sharan	6	6^{4}	[10]
(India) S Bavisetti (India) K Thandi	5	0^{r}
2	(France) E Cascino (Italy) C Rosatello	7	5

Quarterfinals
(France) F Brugnone (France) L Wargnier	4	6	[7]
(Belgium) L Salden (India) P Thombare	6	3	[10]
(France) A Albié (France) L Jeanjean	5	6	[10]
(Romania) K Bejenaru (France) V Muntean	7	2	[2]
(Netherlands) I Haverlag (France) A Robbe	3	3
4	(United Kingdom) A Barnett (United Kingdom) O Nicholls	6	6
(Georgia (country)) M Bolkvadze (United Kingdom) S Murray Sharan	6	7
2	(France) E Cascino (Italy) C Rosatello	4	5

Semifinals
(Belgium) L Salden (India) P Thombare	7	1	[9]
(France) A Albié (France) L Jeanjean	5	6	[11]
4	(United Kingdom) A Barnett (United Kingdom) O Nicholls	4	0
(Georgia (country)) M Bolkvadze (United Kingdom) S Murray Sharan	6	6

Final
(France) A Albié (France) L Jeanjean	6^{5}	0
(Georgia (country)) M Bolkvadze (United Kingdom) S Murray Sharan	7^{7}	6
