= 2024 Open Araba en Femenino – Doubles =

Doubles
- 2024 Open Araba en Femenino

Final
- Champions: (France) Estelle Cascino (Philippines) Alex Eala
- Runners-up: (Bulgaria) Lia Karatancheva (Latvia) Diāna Marcinkēviča
- Score: 6–3, 2–6, [10–4]

Events
Singles	Doubles
← 2023 ·	Open Araba en Femenino	· 2025 →

Alicia Barnett and Olivia Nicholls were the defending champions but chose not to participate.

Estelle Cascino and Alex Eala won the title, defeating Lia Karatancheva and Diāna Marcinkēviča in the final, 6–3, 2–6, [10–4].

== Seeds ==
1. (United Kingdom) Eden Silva / (Ukraine) Valeriya Strakhova (semifinals)
2. (India) Rutuja Bhosale / (Ukraine) Yuliia Starodubtseva (quarterfinals)
3. (France) Estelle Cascino / (Philippines) Alex Eala (champions)
4. (Lithuania) Justina Mikulskytė / (Serbia) Natalija Stevanović (quarterfinals)

== Draw ==
=== Key ===
- Q = Qualifier
- WC = Wild card
- LL = Lucky loser
- Alt = Alternate
- SE = Special exempt
- PR = Protected ranking
- ITF = ITF entry
- JE = Junior exempt
- w/o = Walkover
- r = Retired
- d = Defaulted
- SR = Special ranking

First round
(Belgium) M Kempen (Belgium) L Salden	6	6
(Spain) N Arbaizar Martínez (Spain) O Bienzobas Fernández	0	0
4	(Lithuania) J Mikulskytė (Serbia) N Stevanović	6	6
(Spain) AM Fernández del Moral Perier; E Garkusha	3	1
(Bulgaria) L Karatancheva (Latvia) D Marcinkēviča	6	6
(Spain) M Aristegui (Spain) C Gay	3	4
(Czech Republic) V Bervid (Italy) L Mair	6	6
(Spain) MP Orga Nebra (Spain) L San José	2	1
WC	(Spain) C Gómez (Spain) J Gómez	3	2
3	(France) E Cascino (Philippines) A Eala	6	6
(Germany) L Böhner (Netherlands) L Tran	3	2
(Mexico) M Portillo Ramírez (Bolivia) N Zeballos	6	6
(France) N Berecoechea; A Gureva	4	7^{7}	[6]
2	(India) R Bhosale (Ukraine) Y Starodubtseva	6	6^{5}	[10]

Quarterfinals
1	(United Kingdom) E Silva (Ukraine) V Strakhova	6	1	[11]
(Belgium) M Kempen (Belgium) L Salden	3	6	[9]
4	(Lithuania) J Mikulskytė (Serbia) N Stevanović	3	2
(Bulgaria) L Karatancheva (Latvia) D Marcinkēviča	6	6
(Czech Republic) V Bervid (Italy) L Mair	4	1
3	(France) E Cascino (Philippines) A Eala	6	6
(Mexico) M Portillo Ramírez (Bolivia) N Zeballos	6	6
2	(India) R Bhosale (Ukraine) Y Starodubtseva	4	4

Semifinals
1	(United Kingdom) E Silva (Ukraine) V Strakhova	6	3	[10]
(Bulgaria) L Karatancheva (Latvia) D Marcinkēviča	3	6	[12]
3	(France) E Cascino (Philippines) A Eala	6	6
(Mexico) M Portillo Ramírez (Bolivia) N Zeballos	2	3

Final
(Bulgaria) L Karatancheva (Latvia) D Marcinkēviča	3	6	[4]
3	(France) E Cascino (Philippines) A Eala	6	2	[10]
