= 2024 ITF The Hague – Singles =

Singles
- 2024 ITF The Hague

Final
- Champion: (Netherlands) Arantxa Rus
- Runner-up: (Poland) Gina Feistel
- Score: 6–1, 4–6, 6–2

Events
Singles	Doubles
← 2023 ·	ITF The Hague	· 2025 →

Arantxa Rus successfully defended her title, defeating Gina Feistel in the final; 6–1, 4–6, 6–2.

== Seeds ==
1. (Netherlands) Arantxa Rus (champion)
2. (Czech Republic) Dominika Šalková (semifinals)
3. (Argentina) Martina Capurro Taborda (first round)
4. (Cyprus) Raluca Șerban (quarterfinals)
5. (South Korea) Jang Su-jeong (quarterfinals, withdrew)
6. (Bulgaria) Gergana Topalova (second round)
7. (Bulgaria) Isabella Shinikova (second round)
8. (Serbia) Dejana Radanović (quarterfinals)

== Draw ==
=== Key ===
- Q = Qualifier
- WC = Wild card
- LL = Lucky loser
- Alt = Alternate
- SE = Special exempt
- PR = Protected ranking
- ITF = ITF entry
- JE = Junior exempt
- w/o = Walkover
- r = Retired
- d = Defaulted
- SR = Special ranking

=== Finals ===
Semifinals
1	(Netherlands) Arantxa Rus	3	6	7
SR	(Germany) Nastasja Schunk	6	2	5
Q	(Poland) Gina Feistel	6	3	6
2	(Czech Republic) Dominika Šalková	2	6	4

Final
1	(Netherlands) Arantxa Rus	6	4	6
Q	(Poland) Gina Feistel	1	6	2

=== Top half ===
First round
1	(Netherlands) A Rus	7^{7}	7^{9}
LL	(Germany) M Hodzic	6^{5}	6^{7}
SE	(Spain) L Cortez Llorca	4	6	0
Q	(Greece) M Laki	6	3	6
(Turkey) B Cengiz	6	6
Q	(Turkey) Ç Büyükakçay	1	3
LL	(Mexico) M Portillo Ramírez	2	3
5	(South Korea) S-j Jang	6	6
3	(Argentina) M Capurro Taborda	3	0
WC	(Netherlands) L Ebeling Koning	6	6
Q	(Australia) P Hule	3	6	3
(Canada) V Mboko	6	4	6
SR	(Germany) N Schunk	6	6
(Chinese Taipei) Y-y Yang	3	0
Q	(Germany) A Schmidt	4	4
7	(Bulgaria) I Shinikova	6	6

Second round
1	(Netherlands) A Rus	6	6
Q	(Greece) M Laki	0	0
(Turkey) B Cengiz	1	6	3
5	(South Korea) S-j Jang	6	2	6
WC	(Netherlands) L Ebeling Koning	5	1
(Canada) V Mboko	7	6
SR	(Germany) N Schunk	7	6
7	(Bulgaria) I Shinikova	5	2

Quarterfinals
1	(Netherlands) A Rus	w/o
5	(South Korea) S-j Jang
(Canada) V Mboko	2	4
SR	(Germany) N Schunk	6	6

Semifinals
1	(Netherlands) A Rus	3	6	7
SR	(Germany) N Schunk	6	2	5

=== Bottom half ===
First round
6	(Bulgaria) G Topalova	6	6
Q	(Netherlands) L Tran	4	1
WC	(Netherlands) S van Emst	5	4
Q	(Poland) G Feistel	7	6
SE	(Australia) J Fourlis	4	3
WC	(Netherlands) E Vedder	6	6
(Belgium) S Costoulas	6	2	3
4	(Cyprus) R Șerban	1	6	6
8	(Serbia) D Radanović	6	5	6
Q	(Germany) Y Morderger	1	7	2
(Ukraine) V Strakhova	6	6
(Netherlands) A Koevermans	3	3
(Netherlands) L Pattinama Kerkhove	3	6	3
Q	(Georgia (country)) E Gorgodze	6	2	6
WC	(Netherlands) A Bakker	4	4
2	(Czech Republic) D Šalková	6	6

Second round
6	(Bulgaria) G Topalova	1	4
Q	(Poland) G Feistel	6	6
WC	(Netherlands) E Vedder	7^{7}	1	5
4	(Cyprus) R Șerban	6^{2}	6	7
8	(Serbia) D Radanović	6	0	6
(Ukraine) V Strakhova	0	6	4
Q	(Georgia (country)) E Gorgodze	5	3
2	(Czech Republic) D Šalková	7	6

Quarterfinals
Q	(Poland) G Feistel	7^{10}	4	6
4	(Cyprus) R Șerban	6^{8}	6	4
8	(Serbia) D Radanović	2	2
2	(Czech Republic) D Šalková	6	6

Semifinals
Q	(Poland) G Feistel	6	3	6
2	(Czech Republic) D Šalková	2	6	4
