= 2023 Internationaux Féminins de la Vienne – Singles =

Singles
- 2023 Internationaux Féminins de la Vienne

Final
- Champion: (France) Jessika Ponchet
- Runner-up: (Germany) Anna-Lena Friedsam
- Score: 3–6, 6–3, 7–6^{(7–2)}

Events
Singles	Doubles
← 2022 ·	Internationaux Féminins de la Vienne	· 2024 →

Petra Marčinko was the defending champion, but chose not to participate.

Jessika Ponchet won the title, defeating Anna-Lena Friedsam in the final, 3–6, 6–3, 7–6^{(7–2)}.

== Seeds ==
1. (Germany) Anna-Lena Friedsam (final)
2. (France) Océane Dodin (quarterfinals)
3. (Japan) Mai Hontama (semifinals)
4. (France) Léolia Jeanjean (semifinals)
5. Polina Kudermetova (first round)
6. (France) Jessika Ponchet (champion)
7. (Germany) Noma Noha Akugue (first round)
8. (France) Elsa Jacquemot (quarterfinals)

== Draw ==
=== Key ===
- Q = Qualifier
- WC = Wild card
- LL = Lucky loser
- Alt = Alternate
- ITF = ITF entry
- PR = Protected ranking
- SR = Special ranking
- SE = Special exempt
- JE = Junior exempt
- JR = Junior Accelerator Programme entrant
- CO = College Accelerator Programme entrant
- NG = Next Gen Accelerator Program entrant
- w/o = Walkover
- r = Retired
- d = Defaulted

=== Finals ===
Semifinals
1	(Germany) Anna-Lena Friedsam	3	6	6
4	(France) Léolia Jeanjean	6	3	4
3	(Japan) Mai Hontama	6	6^{3}	3
6	(France) Jessika Ponchet	3	7^{7}	6

Final
1	(Germany) Anna-Lena Friedsam	6	3	6^{2}
6	(France) Jessika Ponchet	3	6	7^{7}

=== Top half ===
First round
1	(Germany) A-L Friedsam	6	6
Q	E Pridankina	4	3
LL	(France) M Szostak	1	7^{7}	2
(Belgium) S Costoulas	6	6^{4}	6
Q	(France) N Radovanovic	2	5
(Poland) K Kawa	6	7
LL	(Netherlands) M Hoedt	6	7
5	P Kudermetova	3	5
4	(France) L Jeanjean	6	7^{7}
LL	(France) H Bougouffa	0	6^{5}
(France) A Hesse	6	6
Q	E Maklakova	4	1
Q	(France) I Ramialison	6	6
Q	(France) C Noël	1	4
Q	(France) É Dartron	7	6
7	(Germany) N Noha Akugue	5	2

Second round
1	(Germany) A-L Friedsam	6	6
(Belgium) S Costoulas	3	2
(Poland) K Kawa	4	6	6
LL	(Netherlands) M Hoedt	6	4	1
4	(France) L Jeanjean	6	7^{7}
(France) A Hesse	1	6^{5}
Q	(France) I Ramialison	3	2
Q	(France) É Dartron	6	6

Quarterfinals
1	(Germany) A-L Friedsam	6	6
(Poland) K Kawa	2	2
4	(France) L Jeanjean	6	7^{7}
Q	(France) É Dartron	2	6^{4}

Semifinals
1	(Germany) A-L Friedsam	3	6	6
4	(France) L Jeanjean	6	3	4

=== Bottom half ===
First round
8	(France) E Jacquemot	6	6
WC	(France) D Martynov	3	4
(France) K Mladenovic	6	5	6
WC	(France) T Lemaître	4	7	4
Q	(Ukraine) N Kolb	3	2
(Serbia) N Stevanović	6	6
(Netherlands) I de Vroome	2	4
3	(Japan) M Hontama	6	6
6	(France) J Ponchet	6	6
Q	(Germany) A Wirges	3	1
(Switzerland) S Waltert	6	4	6
(France) A Robbe	0	6	3
(France) M Rouvroy	5	6	3
(France) A Albié	7	2	6
WC	(France) J Lim	0	2
2	(France) O Dodin	6	6

Second round
8	(France) E Jacquemot	6	6
(France) K Mladenovic	2	2
(Serbia) N Stevanović	1	4
3	(Japan) M Hontama	6	6
6	(France) J Ponchet	4	6	7^{7}
(Switzerland) S Waltert	6	2	6^{4}
(France) A Albié	1	6	1
2	(France) O Dodin	6	4	6

Quarterfinals
8	(France) E Jacquemot	1	4
3	(Japan) M Hontama	6	6
6	(France) J Ponchet	7^{8}	7^{7}
2	(France) O Dodin	6^{6}	6^{4}

Semifinals
3	(Japan) M Hontama	6	6^{3}	3
6	(France) J Ponchet	3	7^{7}	6
