= 2022 Open Araba en Femenino =

Tennis tournament

- Date: 18–24 July 2022
- Edition: 3rd
- Category: ITF Women's World Tennis Tour
- Prize money: $60,000
- Surface: Hard / Outdoor
- Location: Vitoria-Gasteiz, Spain

Champions

Singles
- (France) Jessika Ponchet

Doubles
- Maria Bondarenko / (Romania) Ioana Loredana Roșca
- Open Araba en Femenino

The 2022 Open Araba en Femenino was a professional tennis tournament played on outdoor hard courts. It was the third edition of the tournament which was part of the 2022 ITF Women's World Tennis Tour. It took place in Vitoria-Gasteiz, Spain between 18 and 24 July 2022.

== Champions ==
=== Singles ===
- (France) Jessika Ponchet def. (Switzerland) Jenny Dürst, 6–4, 7–5

=== Doubles ===
- Maria Bondarenko / (Romania) Ioana Loredana Roșca def. (Netherlands) Isabelle Haverlag / (Lithuania) Justina Mikulskytė, 4–6, 6–4, [11–9]

== Singles main draw entrants ==
=== Seeds ===
Country	Player	Rank^{1}	Seed
CHN	Zhu Lin	104	1
ESP	Cristina Bucșa	126	2
FRA	Jessika Ponchet	180	3
AUS	Lizette Cabrera	185	4
SUI	Susan Bandecchi	229	5
LTU	Justina Mikulskytė	242	6
USA	Danielle Lao	277	7
SUI	Lulu Sun	282	8

- ^{1} Rankings are as of 11 July 2022.

=== Other entrants ===
The following players received wildcards into the singles main draw:

- (Spain) Lucía Cortez Llorca
- (Spain) Carolina Gómez
- (Spain) Berta Gutiérrez Saiz
- (Spain) Claudia Hoste Ferrer

The following players received entry from the qualifying draw:

- (France) Flavie Brugnone
- (Spain) Celia Cerviño Ruiz
- (Switzerland) Jenny Dürst
- (South Korea) Ku Yeon-woo
- (Italy) Verena Meliss
- (Slovakia) Sofia Milatová
- (Hungary) Adrienn Nagy
- (Czech Republic) Laetitia Pulchartová
