= 2022 Internationaux Féminins de la Vienne =

Tennis tournament

- Date: 24–30 October 2022
- Edition: 28th
- Category: ITF Women's World Tennis Tour
- Prize money: $80,000
- Surface: Hard / Indoor
- Location: Poitiers, France

Champions

Singles
- (Croatia) Petra Marčinko

Doubles
- (Czech Republic) Miriam Kolodziejová / (Czech Republic) Markéta Vondroušová
← 2021 ·	Internationaux Féminins de la Vienne	· 2023 →

The 2022 Internationaux Féminins de la Vienne was a professional tennis tournament played on indoor hard courts. It was the twenty-eighth edition of the tournament which was part of the 2022 ITF Women's World Tennis Tour. It took place in Poitiers, France between 24 and 30 October 2022.

== Champions ==
=== Singles ===
- (Croatia) Petra Marčinko def. (Belgium) Ysaline Bonaventure, 6–3, 7–6^{(7–2)}

=== Doubles ===
- (Czech Republic) Miriam Kolodziejová / (Czech Republic) Markéta Vondroušová def. (France) Jessika Ponchet / (Czech Republic) Renata Voráčová, 6–4, 6–3

== Singles main draw entrants ==
=== Seeds ===
Country	Player	Rank^{1}	Seed
FRA	Diane Parry	61	1
GER	Tatjana Maria	74	2
CHN	Wang Xinyu	78	3
ROU	Jaqueline Cristian	82	4
CZE	Markéta Vondroušová	95	5
DEN	Clara Tauson	100	6
FRA	Océane Dodin	103	7
	Vitalia Diatchenko	109	8

- ^{1} Rankings are as of 17 October 2022.

=== Other entrants ===
The following players received wildcards into the singles main draw:

- (France) Audrey Albié
- (France) Loïs Boisson
- (France) Elsa Jacquemot
- (France) Marine Partaud

The following player received entry into the singles main draw using a junior exempt:

- (Croatia) Petra Marčinko

The following players received entry from the qualifying draw:

- (Philippines) Alex Eala
- Yuliya Hatouka
- (South Africa) Isabella Kruger
- (Switzerland) Conny Perrin
- (Thailand) Peangtarn Plipuech
- Iryna Shymanovich
- Anastasia Tikhonova
- (France) Alice Tubello

The following player received entry as a lucky loser:

- (France) Amandine Monnot
