= 2022 Internationaux Féminins de la Vienne – Singles =

Singles
- 2022 Internationaux Féminins de la Vienne

Final
- Champion: (Croatia) Petra Marčinko
- Runner-up: (Belgium) Ysaline Bonaventure
- Score: 6–3, 7–6^{(7–2)}

Events
Singles	Doubles
← 2021 ·	Internationaux Féminins de la Vienne	· 2023 →

Chloé Paquet was the defending champion, but lost to Ysaline Bonaventure in the second round.

Petra Marčinko won the title, defeating Bonaventure in the final, 6–3, 7–6^{(7–2)}.

== Seeds ==
1. (France) Diane Parry (first round)
2. (Germany) Tatjana Maria (first round)
3. (China) Wang Xinyu (second round)
4. (Romania) Jaqueline Cristian (first round)
5. (Czech Republic) Markéta Vondroušová (first round)
6. (Denmark) Clara Tauson (semifinals, retired)
7. (France) Océane Dodin (quarterfinals)
8. Vitalia Diatchenko (second round)

== Draw ==
=== Key ===
- Q = Qualifier
- WC = Wild card
- LL = Lucky loser
- Alt = Alternate
- SE = Special exempt
- PR = Protected ranking
- ITF = ITF entry
- JE = Junior exempt
- w/o = Walkover
- r = Retired
- d = Defaulted
- SR = Special ranking

=== Finals ===
Semifinals
(Belgium) Ysaline Bonaventure	6	3	6
Q	(Philippines) Alex Eala	1	6	3
JE	(Croatia) Petra Marčinko	3	6	2
6	(Denmark) Clara Tauson	6	1	1^{r}

Final
(Belgium) Ysaline Bonaventure	3	6^{2}
JE	(Croatia) Petra Marčinko	6	7^{7}

=== Top half ===
First round
1	(France) D Parry	4	4
(France) C Paquet	6	6
Q	(Thailand) P Plipuech	1	2
(Belgium) Y Bonaventure	6	6
(United Kingdom) K Boulter	7^{10}	6
Q	(South Africa) I Kruger	6^{8}	4
WC	(France) L Boisson	3	3
7	(France) O Dodin	6	6
3	(China) Xin Wang	6	6
Q	I Shymanovich	0	3
(Croatia) A Konjuh	1	6	6
Q	(Switzerland) C Perrin	6	4	4
Q	(Philippines) A Eala	6	5	7^{8}
(France) J Ponchet	2	7	6^{6}
WC	(France) M Partaud	3	6	4
8	V Diatchenko	6	4	6

Second round
(France) C Paquet	6^{3}	7^{10}	4
(Belgium) Y Bonaventure	7^{7}	6^{8}	6
(United Kingdom) K Boulter	7^{7}	1	4
7	(France) O Dodin	6^{5}	6	6
3	(China) Xin Wang	6	3	4
(Croatia) A Konjuh	3	6	6
Q	(Philippines) A Eala	6	6
8	V Diatchenko	4	3

Quarterfinals
(Belgium) Y Bonaventure	6	6
7	(France) O Dodin	1	3
(Croatia) A Konjuh	2	3
Q	(Philippines) A Eala	6	6

Semifinals
(Belgium) Y Bonaventure	6	3	6
Q	(Philippines) A Eala	1	6	3

=== Bottom half ===
First round
5	(Czech Republic) M Vondroušová	2	4
Q	Y Hatouka	6	6
(Netherlands) L Pattinama Kerkhove	4	3
(Italy) L Stefanini	6	6
LL	(France) A Monnot	0	2
JE	(Croatia) P Marčinko	6	6
Q	(France) A Tubello	6	4	6
4	(Romania) J Cristian	3	6	4
6	(Denmark) C Tauson	6	7
(Spain) C Bucșa	2	5
(France) H Tan	7^{7}	1	3
Q	A Tikhonova	6^{3}	6	6
(United Kingdom) J Burrage	6	6
WC	(France) E Jacquemot	4	1
WC	(France) A Albié	6^{5}	6	7
2	(Germany) T Maria	7^{7}	3	5

Second round
Q	Y Hatouka	3	4
(Italy) L Stefanini	6	6
JE	(Croatia) P Marčinko	6	6
Q	(France) A Tubello	3	3
6	(Denmark) C Tauson	6	6
Q	A Tikhonova	4	1
(United Kingdom) J Burrage	6	6
WC	(France) A Albié	3	2

Quarterfinals
(Italy) L Stefanini	3	1
JE	(Croatia) P Marčinko	6	6
6	(Denmark) C Tauson	7^{7}	7^{7}
(United Kingdom) J Burrage	6^{2}	6^{5}

Semifinals
JE	(Croatia) P Marčinko	3	6	2
6	(Denmark) C Tauson	6	1	1^{r}
