= 2024 Open Araba en Femenino =

Tennis tournament

- Date: 15–21 July 2024
- Edition: 5th
- Category: ITF Women's World Tennis Tour
- Prize money: $100,000
- Surface: Hard / Outdoor
- Location: Vitoria-Gasteiz, Spain

Champions

Singles
- (Philippines) Alex Eala

Doubles
- (France) Estelle Cascino / (Philippines) Alex Eala
- Open Araba en Femenino

The 2024 Open Araba en Femenino was a professional tennis tournament played on outdoor hard courts. It was the fifth edition of the tournament, which was part of the 2024 ITF Women's World Tennis Tour. It took place in Vitoria-Gasteiz, Spain, between 15 and 21 July 2024.

== Champions ==
=== Singles ===
- (Philippines) Alex Eala def. (Andorra) Victoria Jiménez Kasintseva, 6–4, 6–4

=== Doubles ===
- (France) Estelle Cascino / (Philippines) Alex Eala def. (Bulgaria) Lia Karatancheva / (Latvia) Diāna Marcinkēviča, 6–3, 2–6, [10–4]

== Singles main draw entrants ==
=== Seeds ===
Country	Player	Rank	Seed
UKR	Daria Snigur	130	1
FRA	Jessika Ponchet	133	2
CZE	Linda Fruhvirtová	147	3
UKR	Yuliia Starodubtseva	153	4
PHI	Alex Eala	162	5
SRB	Natalija Stevanović	192	6
AND	Victoria Jiménez Kasintseva	236	7
LTU	Justina Mikulskytė	256	8

- Rankings are as of 1 July 2024.

=== Other entrants ===
The following players received wildcards into the singles main draw:

- (Spain) Mercedes Aristegui
- (Spain) Cayetana Gay
- (Spain) Carolina Gómez
- (Spain) Carmen López Martínez

The following player received entry into the singles main draw using a special ranking:

- (Kazakhstan) Zarina Diyas

The following players received entry from the qualifying draw:

- (France) Estelle Cascino
- (Denmark) Elena Jamshidi
- (Italy) Laura Mair
- (Spain) María Martínez Vaquero
- (Italy) Verena Meliss
- (Turkey) Pemra Özgen
- (Belgium) Lara Salden
- (Netherlands) Lian Tran
