= 2023 Internationaux Féminins de la Vienne =

Tennis tournament

- Date: 23–29 October 2023
- Edition: 29th
- Category: ITF Women's World Tennis Tour
- Prize money: $80,000
- Surface: Hard / Indoor
- Location: Poitiers, France

Champions

Singles
- (France) Jessika Ponchet

Doubles
- (France) Jessika Ponchet / (Netherlands) Bibiane Schoofs
← 2022 ·	Internationaux Féminins de la Vienne	· 2024 →

The 2023 Internationaux Féminins de la Vienne is a professional tennis tournament played on indoor hard courts. It was the twenty-ninth edition of the tournament which was part of the 2023 ITF Women's World Tennis Tour. It took place in Poitiers, France between 23 and 29 October 2023.

== Champions ==
=== Singles ===
- (France) Jessika Ponchet def. (Germany) Anna-Lena Friedsam, 3–6, 6–3, 7–6^{(7–2)}

=== Doubles ===
- (France) Jessika Ponchet / (Netherlands) Bibiane Schoofs def. Ekaterina Maklakova / Elena Pridankina, 7–5, 6–4

== Singles main draw entrants ==
=== Seeds ===
Country	Player	Rank^{1}	Seed
GER	Anna-Lena Friedsam	111	1
FRA	Océane Dodin	115	2
JPN	Mai Hontama	124	3
FRA	Léolia Jeanjean	132	4
	Polina Kudermetova	149	5
FRA	Jessika Ponchet	153	6
GER	Noma Noha Akugue	172	7
FRA	Elsa Jacquemot	174	8

- ^{1} Rankings are as of 16 October 2023.

=== Other entrants ===
The following players received wildcards into the singles main draw:

- (France) Tiphanie Lemaître
- (France) Jenny Lim
- (France) Diana Martynov

The following players received entry from the qualifying draw:

- (France) Émeline Dartron
- (Ukraine) Nadiya Kolb
- Ekaterina Maklakova
- (France) Chloé Noël
- Elena Pridankina
- (France) Nina Radovanovic
- (France) Irina Ramialison
- (Germany) Angelina Wirges

The following players received entry as lucky losers:

- (France) Hanna Bougouffa
- (Netherlands) Merel Hoedt
- (France) Marine Szostak
