= 2022 Internationaux Féminins de la Vienne – Doubles =

Doubles
- 2022 Internationaux Féminins de la Vienne

Final
- Champions: (Czech Republic) Miriam Kolodziejová (Czech Republic) Markéta Vondroušová
- Runners-up: (France) Jessika Ponchet (Czech Republic) Renata Voráčová
- Score: 6–4, 6–3

Events
Singles	Doubles
← 2021 ·	Internationaux Féminins de la Vienne	· 2023 →

Mariam Bolkvadze and Samantha Murray Sharan were the defending champions but chose not to participate.

Miriam Kolodziejová and Markéta Vondroušová won the title, defeating Jessika Ponchet and Renata Voráčová in the final, 6–4, 6–3.

== Seeds ==
1. (France) Jessika Ponchet / (Czech Republic) Renata Voráčová (final)
2. (South Korea) Choi Ji-hee / (Thailand) Peangtarn Plipuech (quarterfinals)
3. (Czech Republic) Miriam Kolodziejová / (Czech Republic) Markéta Vondroušová (champions)
4. (United Kingdom) Freya Christie / (United Kingdom) Ali Collins (quarterfinals)

== Draw ==
=== Key ===
- Q = Qualifier
- WC = Wild card
- LL = Lucky loser
- Alt = Alternate
- SE = Special exempt
- PR = Protected ranking
- ITF = ITF entry
- JE = Junior exempt
- w/o = Walkover
- r = Retired
- d = Defaulted
- SR = Special ranking

=== Draw ===
First round
(France) A Albié (France) E Jacquemot	3	4
(France) Y Mansouri; A Tikhonova	6	6
4	(United Kingdom) F Christie (United Kingdom) A Collins	6	6
(Belgium) M Kempen (France) M Partaud	4	2
(France) C Roméo (France) M Villet	1	1
(Belgium) Y Bonaventure (Netherlands) L Pattinama Kerkhove	6	6
(Philippines) A Eala (Croatia) P Marčinko	6	6
Y Hatouka; I Shymanovich	2	3
(Switzerland) C Perrin (Chinese Taipei) F-h Wu	6	7
(Slovenia) V Erjavec (United Kingdom) E Webley-Smith	4	5

Quarterfinals
1	(France) J Ponchet (Czech Republic) R Voráčová	6	5	[10]
(France) Y Mansouri; A Tikhonova	4	7	[4]
4	(United Kingdom) F Christie (United Kingdom) A Collins	7^{7}	3	[7]
(Belgium) Y Bonaventure (Netherlands) L Pattinama Kerkhove	6^{5}	6	[10]
(Philippines) A Eala (Croatia) P Marčinko	5	2
3	(Czech Republic) M Kolodziejová (Czech Republic) M Vondroušová	7	6
(Switzerland) C Perrin (Chinese Taipei) F-h Wu	6	4	[10]
2	(South Korea) J-h Choi (Thailand) P Plipuech	2	6	[4]

Semifinals
1	(France) J Ponchet (Czech Republic) R Voráčová	7^{7}	2	[10]
(Belgium) Y Bonaventure (Netherlands) L Pattinama Kerkhove	6^{5}	6	[8]
3	(Czech Republic) M Kolodziejová (Czech Republic) M Vondroušová	6	6
(Switzerland) C Perrin (Chinese Taipei) F-h Wu	2	2

Final
1	(France) J Ponchet (Czech Republic) R Voráčová	4	3
3	(Czech Republic) M Kolodziejová (Czech Republic) M Vondroušová	6	6
