= 2021 Internationaux Féminins de la Vienne =

Tennis tournament

- Date: 25–31 October 2021
- Edition: 27th
- Category: ITF Women's World Tennis Tour
- Prize money: $80,000
- Surface: Hard / Indoor
- Location: Poitiers, France

Champions

Singles
- (France) Chloé Paquet

Doubles
- (Georgia (country)) Mariam Bolkvadze / (United Kingdom) Samantha Murray Sharan
← 2019 ·	Internationaux Féminins de la Vienne	· 2022 →

The 2021 Internationaux Féminins de la Vienne was a professional women's tennis tournament played on indoor hard courts. It was the twenty-seventh edition of the tournament which was part of the 2021 ITF Women's World Tennis Tour. It took place in Poitiers, France between 25 and 31 October 2021.

== Singles main-draw entrants ==
=== Seeds ===
Country	Player	Rank^{1}	Seed
FRA	Océane Dodin	92	1
FRA	Harmony Tan	109	2
HUN	Tímea Babos	149	3
FRA	Chloé Paquet	165	4
FRA	Amandine Hesse	175	5
GEO	Mariam Bolkvadze	183	6
UKR	Daria Snigur	184	7
AUT	Julia Grabher	191	8

- ^{1} Rankings are as of 18 October 2021.

=== Other entrants ===
The following players received wildcards into the singles main draw:

- (France) Estelle Cascino
- (France) Émeline Dartron
- (France) Léolia Jeanjean
- (France) Karen Marthiens

The following players received entry from the qualifying draw:

- (France) Audrey Albié
- (United Kingdom) Alicia Barnett
- (United Kingdom) Sarah Beth Grey
- (France) Amandine Monnot
- (France) Victoria Muntean
- (France) Mallaurie Noël
- (France) Alice Robbe
- (India) Karman Thandi

== Champions ==
=== Singles ===
- (France) Chloé Paquet def. (Switzerland) Simona Waltert, 6–4, 6–3

=== Doubles ===
- (Georgia (country)) Mariam Bolkvadze / (United Kingdom) Samantha Murray Sharan def. (France) Audrey Albié / (France) Léolia Jeanjean, 7–6^{(7–5)}, 6–0
