= 2023 Internationaux Féminins de la Vienne – Doubles =

Doubles
- 2023 Internationaux Féminins de la Vienne

Final
- Champions: (France) Jessika Ponchet (Netherlands) Bibiane Schoofs
- Runners-up: Ekaterina Maklakova; Elena Pridankina
- Score: 7–5, 6–4

Events
Singles	Doubles
← 2022 ·	Internationaux Féminins de la Vienne	· 2024 →

Miriam Kolodziejová and Markéta Vondroušová are the defending champions but chose not to participate.

Jessika Ponchet and Bibiane Schoofs won the title, defeating Ekaterina Maklakova and Elena Pridankina in the final, 7–5, 6–4.

== Seeds ==
1. (France) Jessika Ponchet / (Netherlands) Bibiane Schoofs (champions)
2. (Poland) Katarzyna Kawa / (Germany) Julia Lohoff (quarterfinals)
3. (Indonesia) Jessy Rompies / (India) Prarthana Thombare (semifinals)
4. (France) Léolia Jeanjean / (France) Kristina Mladenovic (semifinals)

== Draw ==
=== Key ===
- Q = Qualifier
- WC = Wild card
- LL = Lucky loser
- Alt = Alternate
- SE = Special exempt
- PR = Protected ranking
- ITF = ITF entry
- JE = Junior exempt
- w/o = Walkover
- r = Retired
- d = Defaulted
- SR = Special ranking

=== Draw ===
First round
1	(France) J Ponchet (Netherlands) B Schoofs	6	6
(United Kingdom) S Anane (France) G Kalamaris	1	0
(India) V Shinde (Romania) AG Vasilescu	6	6
(France) D Martynov (France) M Villet	2	1
3	(Indonesia) J Rompies (India) P Thombare	6	6
(France) M Ngijol Carré (France) M Szostak	2	1
(Japan) M Hontama (Serbia) N Stevanović	6	7
(France) E Jacquemot (France) M Rouvroy	1	5
(Belgium) S Costoulas (France) A Hesse	6	6
(Germany) T Morderger (Germany) Y Morderger	2	4
(Netherlands) I de Vroome; P Kudermetova	2	3
4	(France) L Jeanjean (France) K Mladenovic	6	6
(Netherlands) I Haverlag (France) A Robbe	6^{2}	1
E Maklakova; E Pridankina	7^{7}	6
(Ukraine) M Kolb (Ukraine) N Kolb	3	4
2	(Poland) K Kawa (Germany) J Lohoff	6	6

Quarterfinals
1	(France) J Ponchet (Netherlands) B Schoofs	6	6
(India) V Shinde (Romania) AG Vasilescu	4	1
3	(Indonesia) J Rompies (India) P Thombare	7	7
(Japan) M Hontama (Serbia) N Stevanović	5	5
(Belgium) S Costoulas (France) A Hesse	4	3
4	(France) L Jeanjean (France) K Mladenovic	6	6
E Maklakova; E Pridankina	6	6
2	(Poland) K Kawa (Germany) J Lohoff	3	2

Semifinals
1	(France) J Ponchet (Netherlands) B Schoofs	6	6
3	(Indonesia) J Rompies (India) P Thombare	2	1
4	(France) L Jeanjean (France) K Mladenovic	3	5
E Maklakova; E Pridankina	6	7

Final
1	(France) J Ponchet (Netherlands) B Schoofs	7	6
E Maklakova; E Pridankina	5	4
