= Maria Bondarenko =

Russian tennis player

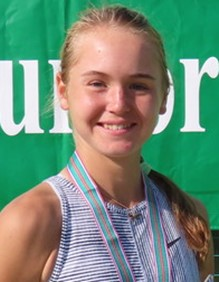
- Country (sports): Russia
- Born: 9 April 2003 (age 23)
- Plays: Right (two-handed backhand)
- Prize money: $52,245

Singles
- Career record: 103–96
- Career titles: 1 ITF
- Highest ranking: No. 304 (21 August 2023)

Doubles
- Career record: 38–39
- Career titles: 1 ITF
- Highest ranking: No. 268 (19 September 2022)

Maria Bondarenko (born 9 April 2003) is an inactive Russian tennis player. She has a career-high WTA singles ranking of No. 304, achieved on 21 August 2023, and a best doubles ranking of No. 268, reached on 19 September 2022.

Bondarenko has won two titles – one in singles and doubles – on the ITF Women's World Tour.

== Juniors ==
Bondarenko had success on the ITF Junior Circuit, maintaining a 101–37 singles win–loss record. She was a runner-up at two junior majors – in the girls' doubles events at the 2020 and 2021 editions of the French Open.

=== Grand Slam performance ===
Singles:

- Australian Open: 2R (2020)
- French Open: 2R (2021)
- Wimbledon: –
- US Open: –

Doubles:

- Australian Open: 1R (2020)
- French Open: F (2020, 2021)
- Wimbledon: –
- US Open: –

She reached a junior combined ranking of world No. 8, on 4 January 2021.

== ITF Circuit finals ==
=== Singles: 3 (1 title, 2 runner-ups) ===
Legend W25 tournaments W15 tournaments	Finals by surface Hard (1–1) Clay (0–1)

Result	W–L	Date	Tournament	Tier	Surface	Opponent	Score
Loss	0–1	Sep 2021	ITF Aix-en-Provence, France	W15	Clay	(France) Gaëlle Desperrier	4–6, 3–6
Loss	0–2	Oct 2022	ITF Sozopol, Bulgaria	W25	Hard	(Bulgaria) Denislava Glushkova	3–6, 3–6
Win	1–2	Jul 2023	ITF El Espinar, Spain	W25	Hard	Ekaterina Reyngold	6–7^{(4)}, 6–0, 6–0

=== Doubles: 4 (1 title, 3 runner-ups) ===
Legend W60 tournaments W25 tournaments W15 tournaments	Finals by surface Hard (1–2) Clay (0–1)

Result	W–L	Date	Tournament	Tier	Surface	Partner	Opponents	Score
Loss	0–1	Sep 2021	ITF Aix-en-Provence, France	W15	Clay	(South Korea) Ku Yeon-woo	(France) Julie Belgraver (France) Léa Tholey	1–6, 2–6
Loss	0–2	Oct 2021	ITF Kiryat Motzkin, Israel	W25	Hard	(France) Carole Monnet	(Netherlands) Quirine Lemoine (Netherlands) Eva Vedder	0–6, 2–6
Loss	0–3	Feb 2022	ITF Cancún, Mexico	W25	Hard	(Latvia) Darja Semenistaja	(United States) Anna Rogers (United States) Christina Rosca	1–6, 4–6
Win	1–3	Jul 2022	Open Araba en Femenino, Spain	W60	Hard	(Romania) Ioana Loredana Roșca	(Netherlands) Isabelle Haverlag (Lithuania) Justina Mikulskytė	4–6, 6–4, [11–9]

== Junior Grand Slam tournament finals ==
=== Doubles: 2 (2 runner-ups) ===
Result	Year	Tournament	Surface	Partner	Opponents	Score
Loss	2020	French Open	Clay	(Russia) Diana Shnaider	(Italy) Eleonora Alvisi (Italy) Lisa Pigato	6–7^{(3)}, 4–6
Loss	2021	French Open	Clay	(Hungary) Amarissa Tóth	(Philippines) Alex Eala (Russia) Oksana Selekhmeteva	0–6, 5–7
