= Ioana Loredana Roșca =

Romanian tennis player

- Country (sports): Romania
- Born: 20 September 1996 (age 30) Craiova, Romania
- Height: 1.78 m (5 ft 10 in)
- Prize money: $107,090
- Official website: ioanarosca.ro

Singles
- Career record: 281–163
- Career titles: 5 ITF
- Highest ranking: No. 360 (6 June 2022)

Doubles
- Career record: 224–95
- Career titles: 26 ITF
- Highest ranking: No. 184 (8 August 2022)

Ioana Loredana Roșca (born 20 September 1996) is an inactive Romanian tennis player.

Roșca won five singles titles and 26 doubles titles on the ITF Women's Circuit. On 6 June 2022, she reached her best singles ranking of world No. 360. On 8 August 2022, she peaked at No. 184 in the doubles rankings.

== Career ==
=== Junior results ===
==== Grand Slam performance ====
Singles:

- Australian Open: 2R (2012)
- French Open: 3R (2014)
- Wimbledon: 3R (2014)
- US Open: 1R (2014)

Doubles:

- Australian Open: 1R (2012)
- French Open: W (2014)
- Wimbledon: 2R (2012, 2013)
- US Open: 2R (2014)

=== Professional ===
Roșca finished school in Spain, between three and eleven years old, practicing various sports, among which also tennis. She chose to return to Romania, her native country, where she focused on tennis player career.

In June 2014, together with fellow Romanian Ioana Ducu, Roșca won the girls' doubles tournament at the French Open, defeating CiCi Bellis and Markéta Vondroušová in three sets in the final.

She was under surgery on the left knee to repair the cross and internal ligament on 12 February 2017. In January 2018, she returned on court and reached the final at an ITF tournament in Hammamet. In November 2021, she joined to club Sportsin Arad and received help to continue her career.

== ITF Circuit finals ==
=== Singles: 13 (5 titles, 8 runner-ups) ===
Legend $25,000 tournaments $15,000 tournaments $10,000 tournaments	Finals by surface Hard (1–4) Clay (4–4)

Result	W–L	Date	Tournament	Tier	Surface	Opponent	Score
Loss	0–1	Mar 2015	ITF Antalya, Turkey	10,000	Hard	(France) Caroline Roméo	3–6, 5–7
Win	1–1	Jul 2015	ITF Târgu Jiu, Romania	10,000	Clay	(Romania) Nicoleta Dascălu	6–2, 4–6, 6–3
Loss	1–2	Jul 2016	ITF Getxo, Spain	10,000	Clay	(France) Jessika Ponchet	6–4, 2–6, 1–6
Loss	1–3	Aug 2016	Internacional de Barcelona, Spain	25,000	Clay	(France) Océane Dodin	3–6, 4–6
Loss	1–4	Sep 2016	ITF Ponta Delgada, Portugal	10,000	Hard	(Spain) Alba Carrillo Marín	3–6, 6–3, 3–6
Loss	1–5	Jan 2018	ITF Hammamet, Tunisia	15,000	Clay	(France) Sara Cakarevic	2–6, 6–7^{(4)}
Win	2–5	Apr 2018	ITF Hammamet, Tunisia	15,000	Clay	(Russia) Maria Marfutina	3–6, 6–3, 7–5
Win	3–5	Sep 2018	ITF Melilla, Spain	15,000	Clay	(Spain) Júlia Payola	6–0, 6–2
Win	4–5	Jan 2019	ITF Manacor, Spain	15,000	Clay	(Spain) Rebeka Masarova	6–2, 6–0
Loss	4–6	Feb 2019	ITF Manacor, Spain	15,000	Clay	(Spain) Marina Bassols Ribera	3–6, 4–6
Loss	4–7	Jun 2019	ITF Madrid, Spain	15,000	Hard	(Spain) Yvonne Cavallé Reimers	6–7^{(4)}, 7–5, 6–7^{(3)}
Loss	4–8	Nov 2019	ITF Lousada, Portugal	15,000	Hard (i)	(Spain) Celia Cerviño Ruiz	6–0, 6–7^{(5)}, 3–6
Win	5–8	Jan 2020	ITF Manacor, Spain	15,000	Hard	(Spain) Rosa Vicens Mas	6–4, 6–1

=== Doubles: 47 (26 titles, 21 runner-ups) ===
Legend $100,000 tournaments $80,000 tournaments $60,000 tournaments $25,000 tournaments $15,000 tournaments $10,000 tournaments	Finals by surface Hard (8–6) Clay (17–14) Carpet (1–1)

Result	W–L	Date	Tournament	Tier	Surface	Partner	Opponents	Score
Loss	0–1	Dec 2011	ITF Antalya, Turkey	10,000	Clay	(Romania) Elena-Teodora Cadar	(Romania) Diana Enache (Netherlands) Daniëlle Harmsen	5–7, 2–6
Loss	0–2	Dec 2012	ITF Antalya, Turkey	10,000	Clay	(Romania) Irina Bara	(Belgium) Justine De Sutter (United States) Katerina Stewart	5–7, 4–6
Win	1–2	Aug 2013	ITF Bucharest, Romania	10,000	Clay	(Romania) Irina Bara	(Romania) Raluca Elena Platon (Romania) Patricia Maria Țig	6–4, 6–4
Win	2–2	Feb 2014	ITF Tinajo, Spain	10,000	Hard	(Japan) Hikari Yamamoto	(Spain) Arabela Fernández Rabener (Belgium) Elise Mertens	6–1, 6–1
Loss	2–3	Sep 2014	ITF Juárez, Mexico	25,000	Clay	(Slovakia) Lenka Wienerová	(Colombia) Mariana Duque Mariño (Brazil) Laura Pigossi	1–6, 6–3, [4–10]
Loss	2–4	Nov 2014	ITF Sharm El Sheikh, Egypt	25,000	Hard	(Bulgaria) Julia Terziyska	(Italy) Alice Matteucci (Belgium) Elise Mertens	7–6^{(1)}, 6–7^{(4)}, [6–10]
Win	3–4	Mar 2015	ITF Antalya, Turkey	10,000	Hard	(Romania) Cristina Ene	(Kazakhstan) Kamila Kerimbayeva (Ukraine) Alyona Sotnikova	6–2, 6–3
Win	4–4	Jul 2015	ITF Iași, Romania	10,000	Clay	(Romania) Oana Georgeta Simion	(Ukraine) Maryna Kolb (Ukraine) Nadiya Kolb	6–3, 7–5
Win	5–4	Jul 2015	ITF Târgu Jiu, Romania	10,000	Clay	(Romania) Raluca Ciufrila	(Argentina) Julieta Estable (Argentina) Daniela Farfán	4–6, 7–6^{(4)}, [10–6]
Win	6–4	Jul 2015	ITF Târgu Jiu, Romania	10,000	Clay	(Romania) Raluca Ciufrila	(Romania) Ana Bianca Mihăilă (Italy) Giulia Pairone	6–4, 6–7^{(4)}, [10–5]
Loss	6–5	Nov 2015	ITF Benicarló, Spain	10,000	Clay	(Ukraine) Oleksandra Korashvili	(United Kingdom) Amanda Carreras (Italy) Alice Savoretti	3–6, 2–6
Loss	6–6	Nov 2015	ITF Castellón, Spain	10,000	Clay	(Ukraine) Oleksandra Korashvili	(Spain) Noelia Bouzó Zanotti (Spain) Olga Sáez Larra	3–6, 5–7
Win	7–6	Jan 2016	ITF Antalya, Turkey	10,000	Clay	(North Macedonia) Lina Gjorcheska	(Belgium) Steffi Distelmans (Switzerland) Chiara Grimm	6–2, 6–2
Loss	7–7	Jan 2016	ITF Antalya, Turkey	10,000	Clay	(North Macedonia) Lina Gjorcheska	(Slovakia) Viktória Kužmová (Slovakia) Petra Uberalová	6–7^{(3)}, 7–6^{(6)}, [5–10]
Loss	7–8	Mar 2016	ITF Antalya, Turkey	10,000	Clay	(Romania) Raluca Ciufrilă	(Slovakia) Vivien Juhászová (Czech Republic) Tereza Malíková	0–6, 4–6
Win	8–8	Jun 2016	ITF Galați, Romania	10,000	Clay	(Moldova) Alexandra Perper	(Romania) Cristina Adamescu (Romania) Oana Georgeta Simion	6–3, 6–4
Win	9–8	Jul 2016	ITF Getxo, Spain	10,000	Clay	(Ukraine) Oleksandra Korashvili	(Argentina) Carla Lucero (France) Jessika Ponchet	6–0, 6–3
Loss	9–9	Jul 2016	ITF El Espinar, Spain	10,000	Hard	(France) Jessika Ponchet	(Ecuador) Charlotte Römer (Germany) Sarah-Rebecca Sekulic	2–6, 6–7^{(4)}
Win	10–9	Sep 2016	ITF Ponta Delgada, Portugal	10,000	Hard	(Portugal) Inês Murta	(Germany) Katharina Hering (Cambodia) Andrea Ka	2–6, 6–4, [11–9]
Win	11–9	Nov 2016	ITF Vinaròs, Spain	10,000	Clay	(Ukraine) Oleksandra Korashvili	(Venezuela) Andrea Gámiz (Ecuador) Charlotte Römer	6–4, 7–6^{(2)}
Loss	11–10	Dec 2016	ITF Casablanca, Morocco	10,000	Clay	(Belgium) Déborah Kerfs	(Romania) Daiana Negreanu (Russia) Yana Sizikova	4–6, 2–6
Loss	11–11	Jan 2017	Open Andrézieux-Bouthéon, France	60,000	Hard (i)	(Romania) Ana Bogdan	(Germany) Nicola Geuer (Germany) Anna Zaja	3–6, 2–2 ret.
Loss	11–12	Jan 2018	ITF Hammamet, Tunisia	15,000	Clay	(Russia) Maria Marfutina	(Chinese Taipei) Hsu Chieh-yu (France) Victoria Muntean	6–3, 5–7, [5–10]
Win	12–12	May 2018	ITF Hammamet, Tunisia	15,000	Clay	(Romania) Cristina Adamescu	(Japan) Mana Ayukawa (Spain) Alicia Herrero Linana	6–4, 6–3
Win	13–12	Aug 2018	ITF Arad, Romania	15,000	Clay	(Romania) Cristina Ene	(Romania) Ioana Gașpar (Spain) Camelia-Elena Hristea	6–3, 6–4
Win	14–12	Sep 2018	ITF Melilla, Spain	15,000	Clay	(Spain) Olga Parres Azcoitia	(Belgium) Catherine Chantraine (Germany) Linda Prenkovic	6–2, 6–2
Win	15–12	Nov 2018	ITF Lousada, Portugal	15,000	Hard (i)	(Spain) Olga Parres Azcoitia	(Spain) Alba Carrillo Marin (Bolivia) Noelia Zeballos	6–2, 6–2
Loss	15–13	Nov 2018	ITF Vinaròs, Spain	15,000	Clay	(Spain) Noelia Bouzó Zanotti	(Spain) Gemma Lairon Navarro (Spain) Rosa Vicens Mas	6–7^{(7)}, 3–6
Loss	15–14	Jun 2019	ITF Madrid, Spain	15,000	Hard	(Bulgaria) Julia Terziyska	(United States) Christina Rosca (Lithuania) Justina Mikulskytė	3–6, 7–6^{(8)}, [8–10]
Loss	15–15	Jul 2019	Open de Biarritz, France	80,000	Clay	(Mexico) Victoria Rodríguez	(France) Manon Arcangioli (Belgium) Kimberley Zimmermann	6–2, 3–6, [6–10]
Loss	15–16	Sep 2019	ITF Clermont-Ferrand, France	25,000	Hard (i)	(France) Lou Brouleau	(Norway) Ulrikke Eikeri (Belgium) Lara Salden	1–6, 4–6
Loss	15–17	Oct 2019	ITF Riba-roja de Túria, Spain	25,000	Clay	(Belgium) Marie Benoît	(Spain) Lara Arruabarrena (Italy) Sara Errani	6–3, 4–6, [8–10]
Loss	15–18	Nov 2019	ITF Solarino, Italy	25,000	Carpet	(Spain) Olga Parres Azcoitia	(Germany) Tayisiya Morderger (Germany) Yana Morderger	3–6, 4–6
Win	16–18	Sep 2020	ITF Montemor-o-Novo, Portugal	25,000	Hard	(Spain) Marina Bassols Ribera	(United Kingdom) Jodie Burrage (United Kingdom) Olivia Nicholls	7–6^{(5)}, 4–6, [10–6]
Win	17–18	Sep 2020	ITF Varna, Bulgaria	15,000	Hard (i)	(Romania) Cristina Dinu	(Romania) Oana Gavrilă (Romania) Andreea Roșca	6–4, 3–6, [10–7]
Win	18–18	Oct 2020	ITF Heraklion, Greece	15,000	Clay	(Romania) Andreea Roșca	(Italy) Melania Delai (Italy) Dalila Spiteri	6–1, 6–3
Win	19–18	Nov 2020	ITF Heraklion, Greece	15,000	Clay	(Romania) Andreea Roșca	(Italy) Melania Delai (Italy) Martina Colmegna	6–4, 6–4
Win	20–18	Nov 2020	ITF Heraklion, Greece	15,000	Clay	(Romania) Andreea Roșca	(Russia) Elina Nepliy (Greece) Dimitra Pavlou	6–3, 6–3
Win	21–18	Feb 2021	Open de l'Isère, France	25,000	Clay	(Belgium) Kimberley Zimmermann	(Netherlands) Arianne Hartono (Japan) Yuriko Miyazaki	6–1, 7–5
Win	22–18	Jun 2021	ITF The Hague, Netherlands	25,000	Clay	(Belgium) Marie Benoît	(Mexico) María Portillo Ramírez (Hungary) Panna Udvardy	6–7^{(5)}, 7–5, [10–7]
Win	23–18	Aug 2021	ITF Pescara, Italy	25,000	Clay	(Romania) Cristina Dinu	(Argentina) Victoria Bosio (Italy) Angelica Moratelli	6–2, 5–7, [10–3]
Loss	23–19	Aug 2021	Vrnjačka Banja Open, Serbia	25,000	Clay	(Egypt) Sandra Samir	(Brazil) Carolina Alves (Venezuela) Andrea Gámiz	4–6, 1–6
Loss	23–20	Feb 2022	ITF Antalya, Turkey	25,000	Clay	(Romania) Andreea Roșca	(Russia) Amina Anshba (Belgium) Marie Benoît	5–7, 6–7^{(4)}
Loss	23–21	Apr 2022	Nottingham Trophy, UK	25,000	Hard	(Netherlands) Isabelle Haverlag	(Hong Kong) Eudice Chong (Hong Kong) Cody Wong	2–6, 3–6
Win	24–21	May 2022	ITF Tossa de Mar, Spain	25,000	Carpet	(Spain) Marina Bassols Ribera	(Spain) Yvonne Cavallé Reimers (Spain) Celia Cerviño Ruiz	7–5, 6–0
Win	25–21	Jul 2022	Open Araba en Femenino, Spain	60,000	Hard	(Russia) Maria Bondarenko	(Netherlands) Isabelle Haverlag (Lithuania) Justina Mikulskytė	4–6, 6–4, [11–9]
Win	26–21	Feb 2023	ITF Manacor, Spain	15,000	Hard	(Spain) Olga Parres Azcoitia	(Switzerland) Naïma Karamoko (Portugal) Inês Murta	6–4, 7–6^{(6)}

=== Junior Grand Slam tournament finals ===
==== Doubles: 1 (title) ====
Result	Year	Tournament	Surface	Partner	Opponents	Score
Win	2014	French Open	Clay	(Romania) Ioana Ducu	(United States) CiCi Bellis (Czech Republic) Markéta Vondroušová	6–1, 5–7, [11–9]
