= María Portillo Ramírez =

Mexican tennis player (born 1999)

- Full name: María José Portillo Ramírez
- Country (sports): Mexico
- Residence: Oaxaca, Mexico
- Born: 8 May 1999 (age 27) Oaxaca
- Plays: Right (two-handed backhand)
- Prize money: $102,680

Singles
- Career record: 219–171
- Career titles: 2 ITF
- Highest ranking: No. 377 (9 September 2024)

Doubles
- Career record: 135–65
- Career titles: 19 ITF
- Highest ranking: No. 220 (11 November 2024)

Team competitions
- Fed Cup: 3–1
- Last updated on: 8 November 2026.

María José Portillo Ramírez (born 8 May 1999) is an inactive Mexican tennis player.

She has career-high WTA rankings of 377 in singles and 220 in doubles, both achieved in 2024. Portillo Ramírez has won two singles titles and 19 doubles titles at tournaments of the ITF Women's Circuit.

Playing for the Mexico Fed Cup team, Portillo Ramírez has a win/loss record of 3–1.

== ITF Circuit finals ==
=== Singles: 7 (2 titles, 5 runner-ups) ===
Legend W35 tournaments W15 tournaments (2–5)	Finals by surface Hard (2–4) Clay (0–1)

Result	W–L	Date	Tournament	Tier	Surface	Opponent	Score
Win	1–0	May 2018	ITF Tacarigua, Trinidad and Tobago	W15	Hard	(Mexico) Andrea Renée Villarreal	6–2, 6–2
Loss	1–1	May 2019	ITF Cancún, Mexico	W15	Hard	(Mexico) Marcela Zacarías	3–6, 1–6
Win	2–1	Nov 2019	ITF Cancún, Mexico	W15	Hard	(France) Tiphanie Fiquet	6–7^{(4)}, 7–5, 6–2
Loss	2–2	Jun 2021	ITF Heraklion, Greece	W15	Clay	(Spain) Jéssica Bouzas Maneiro	3–6, 0–6
Loss	2–3	Oct 2021	ITF Cancún, Mexico	W15	Hard	(Latvia) Darja Semenistaja	3–6, 5–7
Loss	2–4	Oct 2021	ITF Cancún, Mexico	W15	Hard	(Latvia) Darja Semenistaja	7–5, 6–7^{(5)}, 0–6
Loss	2–5	Jan 2022	ITF Cancún, Mexico	W15	Hard	(United States) Hina Inoue	6–1, 3–6, 6–7^{(6)}

=== Doubles: 27 (19 titles, 8 runner-ups) ===
Legend W100 tournaments (1–0) W50 tournaments (0–1) W25/35 tournaments (6–5) W15 tournaments (12–2)	Finals by surface Hard (10–3) Clay (9–5)

Result	W–L	Date	Tournament	Tier	Surface	Partner	Opponents	Score
Win	1–0	Nov 2017	ITF Cúcuta, Colombia	W15	Clay	(United Kingdom) Emily Appleton	(Colombia) Sofía Munera Sánchez (Bolivia) Noelia Zeballos	6–3, 7–6^{(2)}
Win	2–0	Nov 2017	ITF Manta, Ecuador	W15	Hard	(United States) Sofia Sewing	(United Kingdom) Emily Appleton (Colombia) María Herazo González	6–1, 6–3
Win	3–0	Dec 2017	ITF Guayaquil, Ecuador	W15	Clay	(United States) Sofia Sewing	(United States) Stephanie Nemtsova (Peru) Dominique Schaefer	7–5, 6–2
Loss	3–1	Apr 2018	ITF Pelham, United States	W25	Clay	(United States) Maria Mateas	(Chile) Alexa Guarachi (New Zealand) Erin Routliffe	1–6, 2–6
Win	4–1	May 2018	ITF Tacarigua, Trinidad and Tobago	W15	Hard	(United Kingdom) Emily Appleton	(The Bahamas) Kerrie Cartwright (United States) Kariann Pierre-Louis	6–4, 6–3
Loss	4–2	Nov 2018	ITF Norman, United States	W25	Hard	(United States) Sofia Sewing	(Montenegro) Vladica Babić (United States) Ena Shibahara	2–6, 3–6
Win	5–2	Mar 2019	ITF Cancún, Mexico	W15	Hard	(United Kingdom) Emily Appleton	(United States) Dasha Ivanova (Moldova) Alexandra Perper	7–6^{(4)}, 6–4
Loss	5–3	Apr 2019	ITF Cancún, Mexico	W15	Hard	(United Kingdom) Emily Appleton	(Japan) Natsumi Kawaguchi (Israel) Maya Tahan	1–6, 2–6
Win	6–3	May 2019	ITF Cancún, Mexico	W15	Hard	(Mexico) Marcela Zacarías	(Brazil) Eduarda Piai (Guatemala) Kirsten-Andrea Weedon	6–2, 6–2
Win	7–3	May 2019	ITF Cancún, Mexico	W15	Hard	(Mexico) Marcela Zacarías	(Brazil) Thaisa Grana Pedretti (Brazil) Eduarda Piai	6–3, 7–6^{(10)}
Win	8–3	Jul 2019	ITF Cancún, Mexico	W15	Hard	(Brazil) Thaisa Grana Pedretti	(Netherlands) Dewi Dijkman (Netherlands) Isabelle Haverlag	7–5, 6–3
Win	9–3	Jul 2019	ITF Cancún, Mexico	W15	Hard	(Brazil) Thaisa Grana Pedretti	(Japan) Haine Ogata (Japan) Aiko Yoshitomi	6–4, 6–4
Win	10–3	Sep 2019	ITF Lubbock, United States	W15	Hard	(United States) Sofia Sewing	(Japan) Shiori Fukuda (United States) Ashlyn Krueger	6–2, 6–4
Win	11–3	Nov 2019	ITF Naples, United States	W25	Hard	(Romania) Gabriela Talabă	(Croatia) Lea Bošković (Australia) Seone Mendez	7–5, 6–2
Win	12–3	Mar 2021	ITF Amiens, France	W15+H	Clay (i)	(Australia) Seone Mendez	(France) Elsa Jacquemot (Andorra) Victoria Jiménez Kasintseva	6–4, 6–3
Loss	12–4	Apr 2021	ITF Antalya, Turkey	W15	Clay	(Colombia) María Paulina Pérez	(South Korea) Jang Su-jeong (South Korea) Lee So-ra	2–6, 6–2, [7–10]
Loss	12–5	Jul 2021	ITF The Hague, Netherlands	W25	Clay	(Hungary) Panna Udvardy	(Belgium) Marie Benoît (Romania) Ioana Loredana Roșca	7–6^{(5)}, 5–7, [7–10]
Win	13–5	Sep 2021	ITF Cancún, Mexico	W15	Hard	(Mexico) Victoria Rodríguez	(Switzerland) Chelsea Fontenel (United States) Qavia Lopez	6–1, 6–1
Loss	13–6	Nov 2021	ITF Orlando, United States	W25	Clay	(France) Marine Partaud	(United States) Anna Rogers (United States) Christina Rosca	3–6, 1–6
Win	14–6	Nov 2023	ITF Heraklion, Greece	W25	Clay	(Italy) Martina Colmegna	(Latvia) Margarita Ignatjeva (Greece) Elena Korokozidi	6–2, 6–4
Loss	14–7	Feb 2024	ITF Mexico City, Mexico	W50	Hard	(Brazil) Thaisa Grana Pedretti	(United States) Jessie Aney (United States) Jessica Failla	6–3, 4–6, [8–10]
Win	15–7	Apr 2024	ITF Mosquera, Colombia	W35	Clay	(Argentina) Jazmín Ortenzi	(Italy) Nicole Fossa Huergo (Italy) Miriana Tona	6–3, 6–2
Win	16–7	May 2024	ITF Anapoima, Colombia	W35	Clay	(Argentina) Jazmín Ortenzi	(Italy) Nicole Fossa Huergo (Italy) Miriana Tona	6–4, 6–3
Win	17–7	May 2024	ITF Sopo, Colombia	W35	Clay	(Bolivia) Noelia Zeballos	(Colombia) Yuliana Lizarazo (Brazil) Rebeca Pereira	6–4, 6–4
Win	18–7	Sep 2024	ITF Reus, Spain	W35	Clay	(Switzerland) Ylena In-Albon	(Austria) Julia Grabher (Germany) Caroline Werner	6–4, 6–3
Loss	18–8	Apr 2025	ITF Charlotte, United States	W35	Clay	(Mexico) Victoria Rodríguez	(Japan) Haruna Arakawa (Bosnia and Herzegovina) Ema Burgić	2–6, 5–7
Win	19–8	Jun 2025	Open de Biarritz, France	W100	Clay	(Spain) Irene Burillo	(United States) Jessie Aney (Lithuania) Justina Mikulskytė	4–6, 6–1, [10–5]
