= Jessika Ponchet =

French tennis player (born 1996)

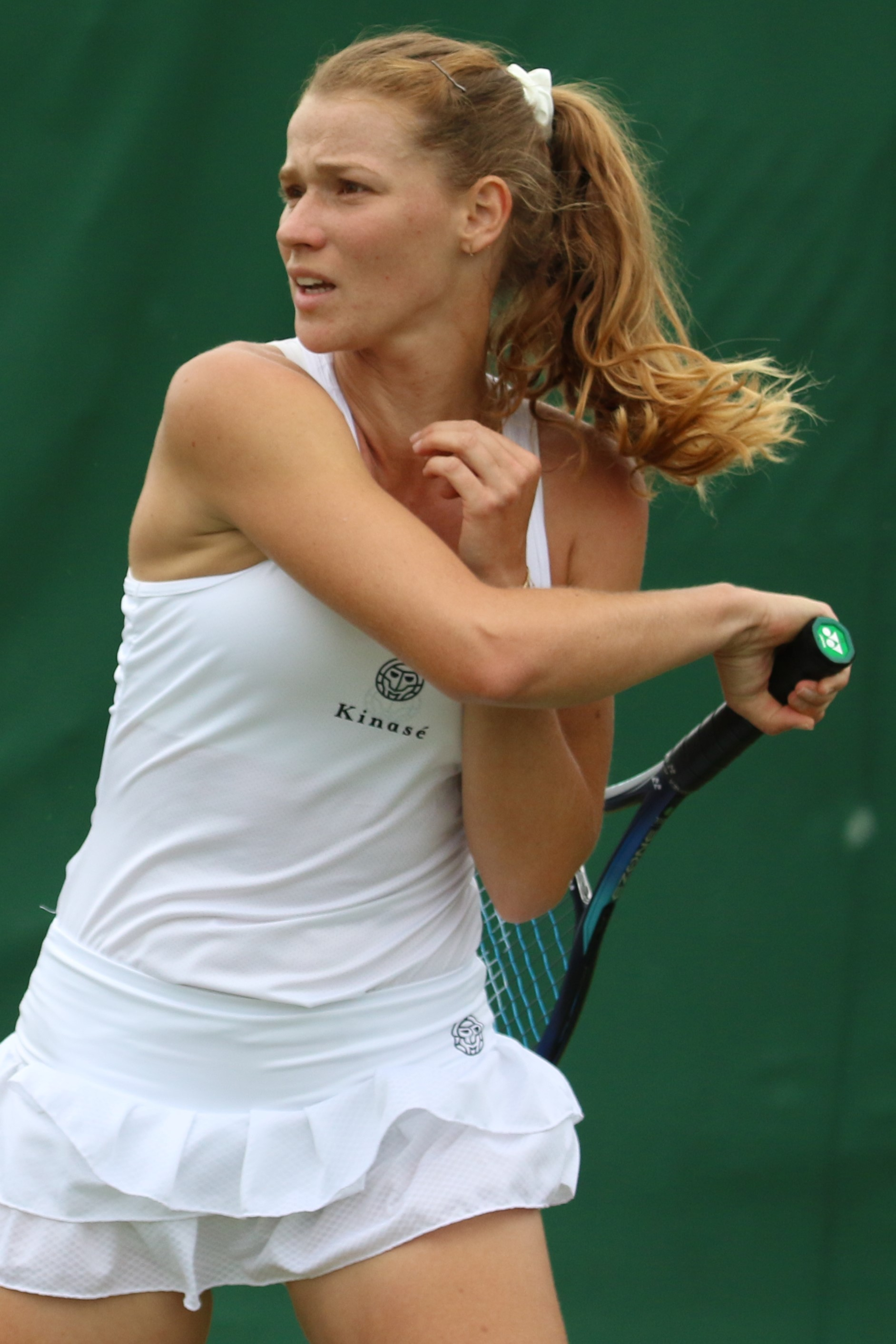
- Ponchet at the 2023 Wimbledon Championships
- Country (sports): France
- Residence: Angresse, France
- Born: 26 September 1996 (age 30) Bayonne, France
- Height: 5 ft 9 in (1.75 m)
- Turned pro: 2011
- Plays: Right (one-handed backhand)
- Prize money: $1,673,390

Singles
- Career record: 396–290
- Career titles: 10 ITF
- Highest ranking: No. 104 (9 September 2024)
- Current ranking: No. 316 (28 September 2026)

Grand Slam singles results
- Australian Open: 1R (2018, 2019)
- French Open: 1R (2018, 2019, 2023, 2024)
- Wimbledon: Q3 (2022)
- US Open: 3R (2024)

Doubles
- Career record: 182–152
- Career titles: 2 WTA Challenger, 14 ITF
- Highest ranking: No. 101 (28 November 2022)
- Current ranking: No. 207 (28 September 2026)

Grand Slam doubles results
- French Open: 1R (2018, 2019, 2020, 2021, 2022, 2023, 2024, 2025, 2026)

Grand Slam mixed doubles results
- French Open: 1R (2025)
- Last updated on: 8 October 2026.

Jessika Ponchet (born 26 September 1996) is a French professional tennis player. She has career-high WTA rankings of world No. 104 in singles, achieved on 9 September 2024, and No. 101 in doubles, reached on 28 November 2022.

== Career ==
Ponchet did not play any ITF Junior Circuit tournaments, plunging straight into the ITF Women's Circuit at the age of 14.

=== 2011–2013 ===
Ponchet played the singles events of four tournaments and the doubles event of one tournament on the 2011 ITF Circuit, starting with a $100k tournament held in early July in the French city of Biarritz. She played a total of 11 and 18 ITF tournaments in 2012 and 2013, respectively.

=== 2014–2016 ===
Ponchet played a total of 17 tournaments on the ITF Circuit in 2014. She suffered a major setback when torn knee ligaments forced her to miss tournaments in the first eight months of 2015. She played the singles events of seven tournaments and one doubles event on the 2015 ITF Circuit.

In 2016, Ponchet played a total of 22 tournaments on the ITF Circuit in the 2016 season.

=== 2017: WTA 125 debut ===
She made her major debut in the French Open qualifying, after having been handed a wildcard; however, after defeating Dalma Gálfi (the 2015 ITF World Champion in the girls' combined category), she lost to fourth seed, Richèl Hogenkamp, in the second round.

Ponchet made her WTA 125 debut at the Open de Limoges, entering only its singles event. She received a wildcard for the main draw, where she defeated her compatriot, Chloé Paquet, in the first round and lost to the No. 7 seed, Kaia Kanepi, in the second.

Ponchet finished 2017 with a final win–loss record of 42–24 for singles matches.

=== 2018–2019: Major debut ===
She made her major main-draw debut in singles at the Australian Open, after receiving a wildcard, but she lost in the first round to third seed Garbiñe Muguruza. Prior to the Australian Open, Ponchet had in her entire career played in the singles main-draw event of just one tournament that was at a higher level than the ITF Women's Circuit (the 2017 Open de Limoges) and had never even faced a player ranked in the top 100 of the WTA singles rankings.

Ponchet made her French Open debut, after receiving a wildcard for the singles main draw, where she lost in the first round to the unseeded Lucie Šafářová, in straight sets.

At the 2019 Australian Open, Ponchet reached the singles main draw where she lost in the first round to 19th-seeded Caroline Garcia, after winning all her three qualifying matches without dropping a set.

On 9 April 2019, in her first-round match at the $25k tournament in Sunderland, Ponchet was leading Tara Moore 6–0, 5–0 and had a match point to achieve a double bagel, but Moore staged a comeback to win 0–6, 7–6, 6–3.

=== 2023: First WTA 125 doubles title ===
Ponchet received wildcards for the French Open for the singles main draw, and in doubles partnering Elixane Lechemia. She entered the Guangzhou Open main draw as a lucky loser but lost to qualifier Moyuka Uchijima.

Partnering Maia Lumsden, Ponchet won her first WTA 125 doubles title at the Open de Rouen, defeating top seeds Anna Bondár and Kimberley Zimmermann in straight sets in the final.

=== 2024: US Open third round ===
Ponchet qualified for the Rosmalen Open but lost to Aleksandra Krunić in the first round. Ranked No. 143, Ponchet made her singles main-draw debut at the US Open, after winning all three of her qualifying matches in straight sets. She then defeated Zheng Saisai in the first round for her first match win at a major. She reached a Grand Slam tournament third round for the first time, after receiving a walkover in the second when fourth seed Elena Rybakina withdrew because of injury. As a result, she moved close to 40 positions up in the WTA rankings to a new career-high at No. 104 on 9 September 2024.In the third round, she lost to Caroline Wozniacki in straight sets.

After entering the singles main draw of the Japan Women's Open as a lucky loser, she failed to convert a match point in the third set in her first round loss to eighth seed Elisabetta Cocciaretto. In the first round of the Hong Kong Open, the unseeded Ponchet posted her second career top-50 win by defeating fourth seed Wang Xinyu to reach the second round, before losing to wildcard entrant Sofia Kenin.

=== 2025: First WTA Tour quarterfinals ===
Gaining entry to the main-draw as a lucky loser, Ponchet defeated qualifiers Margaux Rouvroy and Fiona Ferro to reach her first WTA Tour quarterfinal at the Rouen Open, where she lost to Elena-Gabriela Ruse.

Once again entering the main draw as a lucky loser at the Prague Open, she made it through to the quarterfinals with wins over fellow lucky loser Nina Stojanović and wildcard entrant Barbora Palicová. Ponchet lost to Tereza Valentová in the last eight.

In December, teaming up with Tamara Korpatsch, Ponchet won her second WTA 125 doubles title at the Open Angers Arena Loire, defeating Jesika Malečková and Miriam Škoch in the final. The following week at the Open de Limoges, she combined with fellow French player Elsa Jacquemot to reach the doubles final, but they lost to top seeds Cristina Bucșa and Zhang Shuai.

== Performance timelines ==
Key
W	F	SF	QF	#R	RR	Q#	P#	DNQ	A	Z#	PO	G	S	B	NMS	NTI	P	NH

(W) winner; (F) finalist; (SF) semifinalist; (QF) quarterfinalist; (#R) rounds 4, 3, 2, 1; (RR) round-robin stage; (Q#) qualification round; (P#) preliminary round; (DNQ) did not qualify; (A) absent; (Z#) Davis/Fed Cup Zonal Group (with number indication) or (PO) play-off; (G) gold, (S) silver or (B) bronze Olympic/Paralympic medal; (NMS) not a Masters tournament; (NTI) not a Tier I tournament; (P) postponed; (NH) not held; (SR) strike rate (events won / competed); (W–L) win–loss record.
To avoid confusion and double counting, these charts are updated at the conclusion of a tournament or when the player's participation has ended.

=== Singles ===
Current through the 2026 US Open.

Tournament	2017	2018	2019	2020	2021	2022	2023	2024	2025	2026	SR	W–L
Grand Slam tournaments
Australian Open	A	1R	1R	Q1	A	Q1	Q2	Q2	Q1	Q1	0 / 2	0–2
French Open	Q2	1R	1R	Q1	A	Q2	1R	1R	Q1	Q2	0 / 4	0–4
Wimbledon	A	A	Q2	NH	Q1	Q3	Q1	Q1	Q1	Q1	0 / 0	0–0
US Open	A	Q1	Q1	A	Q1	Q1	Q1	3R	Q2	A	0 / 1	2–1
Win–loss	0–0	0–2	0–2	0–0	0–0	0–0	0–1	2–2	0–0	0–0	0 / 7	2–7
Career statistics
Tournaments	0	2	2	0	0	1	1	2			Career total: 7	
Overall win-loss	0–0	0–2	0–2	0–0	0–0	0–1	0–1	2–2			0 / 7	2–8

== WTA 125 finals ==
=== Doubles: 6 (2 titles, 4 runner-ups) ===
Result	W–L	Date	Tournament	Surface	Partner	Opponents	Score
Loss	0–1	Feb 2020	Newport Beach Challenger, United States	Hard	(Belgium) Marie Benoît	(United States) Hayley Carter (Brazil) Luisa Stefani	1–6, 3–6
Loss	0–2	Dec 2021	Open de Limoges, France	Hard (i)	(France) Estelle Cascino	(Romania) Monica Niculescu (Russia) Vera Zvonareva	4–6, 4–6
Loss	0–3	May 2022	Open de Saint-Malo, France	Clay	(France) Estelle Cascino	(Japan) Eri Hozumi (Japan) Makoto Ninomiya	6–7^{(1–7)}, 1–6
Win	1–3	Oct 2023	Open de Rouen, France	Hard (i)	(United Kingdom) Maia Lumsden	(Hungary) Anna Bondár (Belgium) Kimberley Zimmermann	6–3, 7–6^{(7–4)}
Win	2–3	Dec 2025	Open Angers, France	Hard (i)	(Germany) Tamara Korpatsch	(Czech Republic) Jesika Malečková (Czech Republic) Miriam Škoch	6–3, 6–2
Loss	2–4	Dec 2025	Open de Limoges, France	Hard (i)	(France) Elsa Jacquemot	(Spain) Cristina Bucșa (China) Zhang Shuai	3–6, 1–6

== ITF Circuit finals ==
=== Singles: 19 (10 titles, 9 runner-ups) ===
Legend W100 tournaments (0–2) W80 tournaments (1–0) W60/75 tournaments (1–1) W40 tournaments (1–0) W25 tournaments (4–3) W10 tournaments (3–3)	Finals by surface Hard (7–7) Clay (3–1) Grass (0–1)

Result	W–L	Date	Tournament	Tier	Surface	Opponent	Score
Loss	0–1	Oct 2015	ITF Port El Kantaoui, Tunisia	W10	Hard	(Ukraine) Valeriya Strakhova	2–6, 3–6
Loss	0–2	May 2016	ITF Monzón, Spain	W10	Hard	(Czech Republic) Marie Bouzková	4–6, 4–6
Win	1–2	Jul 2016	ITF Getxo, Spain	W10	Clay	(Romania) Ioana Loredana Roșca	4–6, 6–2, 6–1
Win	2–2	Jul 2016	ITF El Espinar, Spain	W10	Hard	(Spain) Rocío de la Torre Sánchez	6–4, 6–2
Loss	2–3	Nov 2016	ITF Vinaròs, Spain	W10	Clay	(Venezuela) Andrea Gamiz	6–1, 1–6, 4–6
Win	3–3	Nov 2016	ITF Benicarló, Spain	W10	Clay	(United Kingdom) Amanda Carreras	6–0, 7–6^{(6)}
Win	4–3	Jul 2018	ITF Figueira da Foz, Portugal	W25	Hard	(Spain) Eva Guerrero Álvarez	7–6^{(4)}, 6–2
Win	5–3	Feb 2019	GB Pro-Series Glasgow, UK	W25	Hard (i)	(Georgia (country)) Mariam Bolkvadze	6–3, 6–1
Loss	5–4	Mar 2020	ITF Mâcon, France	W25	Hard (i)	(France) Océane Dodin	6–3, 1–6, 3–6
Loss	5–5	Jun 2021	ITF Figueira da Foz, Portugal	W25	Hard	(France) Tessah Andrianjafitrimo	7–6^{(3)}, 1–6, 0–6
Win	6–5	Sep 2021	ITF Leiria, Portugal	W25	Hard	(Finland) Anastasia Kulikova	7–6^{(3)}, 6–0
Loss	6–6	Jul 2022	ITF Palma del Río, Spain	W25+H	Hard	(Spain) Marina Bassols Ribera	7–5, 4–6, 3–6
Win	7–6	Jul 2022	Open Araba en Femenino, Spain	W60	Hard	(Switzerland) Jenny Dürst	6–4, 7–5
Win	8–6	Sep 2022	ITF Saint-Palais-sur-Mer, France	W25	Clay	(France) Séléna Janicijevic	6–1, 6–4
Win	9–6	Feb 2023	ITF Mâcon, France	W40	Hard (i)	(Belgium) Yanina Wickmayer	6–3, 2–6, 6–4
Loss	9–7	Jul 2023	Open Araba en Femenino, Spain	W100	Hard	(Ukraine) Daria Snigur	6–3, 4–6, 1–6
Win	10–7	Oct 2023	Internationaux de Poitiers, France	W80	Hard (i)	(Germany) Anna-Lena Friedsam	3–6, 6–3, 7–6^{(2)}
Loss	10–8	Jan 2024	Open Andrézieux-Bouthéon, France	W75	Hard (i)	(United Kingdom) Lily Miyazaki	6–3, 4–6, 1–6
Loss	10–9	Jun 2024	Ilkley Trophy, United Kingdom	W100	Grass	(Canada) Rebecca Marino	6–4, 1–6, 4–6

=== Doubles: 26 (14 titles, 12 runner-ups) ===
Legend W100 tournaments (1–1) W80 tournaments (1–1) W60/75 tournaments (7–4) W25 tournaments (2–3) W10/15 tournaments (3–3)	Finals by surface Hard (10–9) Clay (4–2) Carpet (0–1)

Result	W–L	Date	Tournament	Tier	Surface	Partner	Opponents	Score
Win	1–0	Mar 2014	ITF Gonesse, France	W10	Clay (i)	(Czech Republic) Karolína Stuchlá	(Germany) Carolin Daniels (Germany) Lena-Marie Hofmann	6–7^{(4)}, 6–3, [10–3]
Win	2–0	Jun 2016	ITF Madrid, Spain	W10	Clay	(Russia) Marina Shamayko	(Spain) Ainhoa Atucha Gómez (Spain) María José Luque Moreno	6–2, 6–3
Loss	2–1	Jul 2016	ITF Getxo, Spain	W10	Clay	(Argentina) Carla Lucero	(Ukraine) Oleksandra Korashvili (Romania) Ioana Loredana Roșca	0–6, 3–6
Loss	2–2	Jul 2016	ITF El Espinar, Spain	W10	Hard	(Romania) Ioana Loredana Roșca	(Ecuador) Charlotte Roemer (Germany) Sarah-Rebecca Sekulic	2–6, 6–7^{(4)}
Win	3–2	Dec 2016	ITF Castellón de la Plana, Spain	W10	Clay	(Brazil) Laura Pigossi	(Spain) Arabela Fernández Rabener (Australia) Isabelle Wallace	6–1, 6–3
Loss	3–3	Apr 2017	ITF Hammamet, Tunisia	W15	Clay	(France) Manon Arcangioli	(Brazil) Gabriela Cé (Venezuela) Andrea Gamiz	1–6, 2–6
Loss	3–4	Apr 2018	ITF Óbidos, Portugal	W25	Carpet	(Ukraine) Ganna Poznikhirenko	(United Kingdom) Sarah Beth Grey (United Kingdom) Olivia Nicholls	2–6, 1–6
Loss	3–5	Jul 2018	ITF Figueira da Foz, Portugal	W25	Hard	(Belarus) Sviatlana Pirazhenka	(Spain) Yvonne Cavallé Reimers (Venezuela) Andrea Gamiz	2–6, 5–7
Win	4–5	May 2019	ITF Les Franqueses del Vallès, Spain	W60	Hard	(United Kingdom) Eden Silva	(United Kingdom) Jodie Burrage (United Kingdom) Olivia Nicholls	6–3, 6–4
Win	5–5	Aug 2019	Lexington Challenger, United States	W60	Hard	(United States) Robin Anderson	(United States) Ann Li (United States) Jamie Loeb	7–6^{(4)}, 6–7^{(5)}, [10–7]
Win	6–5	Sep 2019	Caldas da Rainha Open, Portugal	W60	Hard	(Bulgaria) Isabella Shinikova	(Kazakhstan) Anna Danilina (Germany) Vivian Heisen	6–1, 6–3
Win	7–5	Nov 2019	Toronto Challenger, Canada	W60	Hard (i)	(United States) Robin Anderson	(Canada) Mélodie Collard (Canada) Leylah Fernandez	7–6^{(7)}, 6–2
Win	8–5	Oct 2020	ITF Cherbourg-en-Cotentin, France	W25	Hard (i)	(United States) Robin Anderson	(United Kingdom) Harriet Dart (United Kingdom) Sarah Beth Grey	4–6, 6–4, [10–8]
Win	9–5	May 2021	Open Saint-Gaudens, France	W60	Clay	(France) Estelle Cascino	(United Kingdom) Eden Silva (Belgium) Kimberley Zimmermann	0–6, 7–5, [10–7]
Win	10–5	Nov 2021	Open Nantes Atlantique, France	W60	Hard (i)	(United Kingdom) Samantha Murray Sharan	(United Kingdom) Alicia Barnett (United Kingdom) Olivia Nicholls	6–4, 6–2
Win	11–5	Jan 2022	Open Andrézieux-Bouthéon, France	W60	Hard (i)	(France) Estelle Cascino	(United Kingdom) Alicia Barnett (United Kingdom) Olivia Nicholls	6–4, 6–1
Loss	11–6	Apr 2022	ITF Calvi, France	W25+H	Hard	(France) Estelle Cascino	Sofya Lansere (Ukraine) Valeriya Strakhova	4–6, 6–7^{(5)}
Win	12–6	Apr 2022	ITF Monastir, Tunisia	W25	Hard	(France) Estelle Cascino	Polina Kudermetova; Sofya Lansere	6–0, 4–6, [10–7]
Loss	12–7	Oct 2022	Internationaux de Poitiers, France	W80	Hard (i)	(Czech Republic) Renata Voráčová	(Czech Republic) Miriam Kolodziejová (Czech Republic) Markéta Vondroušová	4–6, 3–6
Loss	12–8	Nov 2022	GB Pro-Series Shrewsbury, UK	W100	Hard (i)	(Czech Republic) Renata Voráčová	(Czech Republic) Miriam Kolodziejová (Czech Republic) Markéta Vondroušová	6–7^{(4)}, 2–6
Win	13–8	Sep 2023	ITF Tokyo Open, Japan	W100	Hard	(Netherlands) Bibiane Schoofs	(United Kingdom) Alicia Barnett (United Kingdom) Olivia Nicholls	4–6, 6–1, [10–7]
Win	14–8	Oct 2023	Internationaux de Poitiers, France	W80	Hard (i)	(Netherlands) Bibiane Schoofs	Ekaterina Maklakova; Elena Pridankina	7–5, 6–4
Loss	14–9	Mar 2024	Open de Seine-et-Marne, France	W75	Hard (i)	(United Kingdom) Maia Lumsden	(France) Estelle Cascino (Philippines) Alex Eala	5–7, 6–7^{(4)}
Loss	14–10	Mar 2025	Trnava Indoor, Slovakia	W75	Hard (i)	(Belgium) Magali Kempen	(Netherlands) Isabelle Haverlag; Elena Pridankina	2–6, 3–6
Loss	14–11	Mar 2025	Branik Maribor Open, Slovenia	W75	Hard (i)	(United Kingdom) Lily Miyazaki	(France) Julie Belgraver (Poland) Urszula Radwańska	1–6, 4–6
Loss	14–12	Mar 2026	Branik Maribor Open, Slovenia	W75	Hard (i)	(Czech Republic) Anna Sisková	(Germany) Anna-Lena Friedsam (Czech Republic) Gabriela Knutson	6–4, 4–6, [6–10]
