= 2023 WTA 125 tournaments =

Professional tennis circuit tournaments

Details
- Duration: 30 January – 17 December 2023
- Edition: 12th
- Tournaments: 31

Achievements (singles)
- Most titles: (Spain) Marina Bassols Ribera (Romania) Ana Bogdan (Netherlands) Arantxa Rus (Egypt) Mayar Sherif (2)
- Most finals: (Spain) Marina Bassols Ribera (France) Diane Parry (3)

The WTA 125 tournaments are the secondary professional tennis circuit tournaments organised by the Women's Tennis Association. The 2023 calendar consists of thirty-one tournaments.

== Schedule ==
Week of	Tournament	Champions	Runners-up	Semifinalists	Quarterfinalists
January 30	Copa Oster; Cali, Colombia; Clay – $115,000 – 32S/16Q/16D; Singles – Doubles	(Argentina) Nadia Podoroska; 6–4, 6–2	(Argentina) Paula Ormaechea	(Colombia) Emiliana Arango (Brazil) Laura Pigossi	(Mexico) Fernanda Contreras Gómez (Italy) Martina Colmegna (United States) Elvina Kalieva (Ukraine) Valeriya Strakhova
January 30	Copa Oster; Cali, Colombia; Clay – $115,000 – 32S/16Q/16D; Singles – Doubles	(Poland) Weronika Falkowska (Poland) Katarzyna Kawa; 6–1, 5–7, [10–6]	(Japan) Kyōka Okamura (China) You Xiaodi	(Colombia) Emiliana Arango (Brazil) Laura Pigossi	(Mexico) Fernanda Contreras Gómez (Italy) Martina Colmegna (United States) Elvina Kalieva (Ukraine) Valeriya Strakhova
March 27	San Luis Potosí Open; San Luis Potosí, Mexico; Clay – $115,000 – 32S/8Q/16D; Singles – Doubles	(Italy) Elisabetta Cocciaretto; 5–7, 6–4, 7–5	(Italy) Sara Errani	Elina Avanesyan (Slovenia) Kaja Juvan	(Slovenia) Tamara Zidanšek (Colombia) Emiliana Arango (Brazil) Laura Pigossi (Germany) Tatjana Maria
March 27	San Luis Potosí Open; San Luis Potosí, Mexico; Clay – $115,000 – 32S/8Q/16D; Singles – Doubles	(Spain) Aliona Bolsova (Venezuela) Andrea Gámiz; 7–6^{(7–5)}, 6–4	(Georgia (country)) Oksana Kalashnikova (Poland) Katarzyna Piter	Elina Avanesyan (Slovenia) Kaja Juvan	(Slovenia) Tamara Zidanšek (Colombia) Emiliana Arango (Brazil) Laura Pigossi (Germany) Tatjana Maria
May 1	L'Open 35 de Saint-Malo; Saint-Malo, France; Clay – $115,000 – 32S/11Q/15D; Singles – Doubles	(United States) Sloane Stephens; 6–3, 6–4	(Belgium) Greet Minnen	(Ukraine) Elina Svitolina (United States) Katie Volynets	(France) Jessika Ponchet (France) Léolia Jeanjean (Poland) Magdalena Fręch (United States) Emma Navarro
May 1	L'Open 35 de Saint-Malo; Saint-Malo, France; Clay – $115,000 – 32S/11Q/15D; Singles – Doubles	(Belgium) Greet Minnen (Netherlands) Bibiane Schoofs; 7–6^{(9–7)}, 7–6^{(7–3)}	(Norway) Ulrikke Eikeri (Japan) Eri Hozumi	(Ukraine) Elina Svitolina (United States) Katie Volynets	(France) Jessika Ponchet (France) Léolia Jeanjean (Poland) Magdalena Fręch (United States) Emma Navarro
May 1	Catalonia Open; Reus, Spain; Clay – $115,000 – 32S/8Q/12D; Singles – Doubles	(Romania) Sorana Cîrstea; 6–1, 4–6, 7–6^{(7–1)}	(United States) Elizabeth Mandlik	(Ukraine) Dayana Yastremska (United States) Lauren Davis	(Switzerland) Jil Teichmann (Spain) Nuria Párrizas Díaz (Colombia) Camila Osorio (United States) Caty McNally
May 1	Catalonia Open; Reus, Spain; Clay – $115,000 – 32S/8Q/12D; Singles – Doubles	(Australia) Storm Hunter (Australia) Ellen Perez; 6–1, 7–6^{(10–8)}	(Chile) Alexa Guarachi (New Zealand) Erin Routliffe	(Ukraine) Dayana Yastremska (United States) Lauren Davis	(Switzerland) Jil Teichmann (Spain) Nuria Párrizas Díaz (Colombia) Camila Osorio (United States) Caty McNally
May 15	Trophée Clarins; Paris, France; Clay – $115,000 – 32S/8Q/8D; Singles – Doubles	(France) Diane Parry; Walkover	(United States) Caty McNally	(United States) Katie Volynets; Varvara Gracheva	(France) Alizé Cornet (Japan) Nao Hibino (Czech Republic) Linda Nosková; Kamilla Rakhimova
May 15	Trophée Clarins; Paris, France; Clay – $115,000 – 32S/8Q/8D; Singles – Doubles	(Kazakhstan) Anna Danilina; Vera Zvonareva; 5–7, 7–6^{(7–2)}, [14–12]	(Ukraine) Nadiia Kichenok (United States) Alycia Parks	(United States) Katie Volynets; Varvara Gracheva	(France) Alizé Cornet (Japan) Nao Hibino (Czech Republic) Linda Nosková; Kamilla Rakhimova
May 15	Firenze Ladies Open; Florence, Italy; Clay – $115,000 – 32S/14Q/16D; Singles – Doubles	(Italy) Jasmine Paolini; 6–3, 7–5	(United States) Taylor Townsend	(Italy) Lucia Bronzetti (Italy) Sara Errani	(Australia) Priscilla Hon (Switzerland) Ylena In-Albon (Italy) Matilde Paoletti (Canada) Eugenie Bouchard
May 15	Firenze Ladies Open; Florence, Italy; Clay – $115,000 – 32S/14Q/16D; Singles – Doubles	(Germany) Vivian Heisen (Estonia) Ingrid Neel; 1–6, 6–2, [10–8]	(United States) Asia Muhammad (Mexico) Giuliana Olmos	(Italy) Lucia Bronzetti (Italy) Sara Errani	(Australia) Priscilla Hon (Switzerland) Ylena In-Albon (Italy) Matilde Paoletti (Canada) Eugenie Bouchard
June 5	Makarska Open 125; Makarska, Croatia; Clay – $115,000 – 32S/8Q/8D; Singles – Doubles	(Egypt) Mayar Sherif; 2–6, 7–6^{(8–6)}, 7–5	(Italy) Jasmine Paolini	(France) Diane Parry (Slovakia) Rebecca Šramková	(Czech Republic) Linda Nosková (China) Yuan Yue (Ukraine) Kateryna Baindl (Croatia) Ana Konjuh
June 5	Makarska Open 125; Makarska, Croatia; Clay – $115,000 – 32S/8Q/8D; Singles – Doubles	(Estonia) Ingrid Neel (Chinese Taipei) Wu Fang-hsien; 6–3, 7–5	(Czech Republic) Anna Sisková (Czech Republic) Renata Voráčová	(France) Diane Parry (Slovakia) Rebecca Šramková	(Czech Republic) Linda Nosková (China) Yuan Yue (Ukraine) Kateryna Baindl (Croatia) Ana Konjuh
June 5	Torneig Internacional de Solgironès; La Bisbal d'Empordà, Spain; Clay – $115,000 – 32S/8Q/8D; Singles – Doubles	(Netherlands) Arantxa Rus; 7–6^{(7–2)}, 6–3	(Hungary) Panna Udvardy	(Spain) Rebeka Masarova (Argentina) María Lourdes Carlé	(Argentina) Nadia Podoroska (Slovenia) Kaja Juvan (United States) Caroline Dolehide (Switzerland) Jil Teichmann
June 5	Torneig Internacional de Solgironès; La Bisbal d'Empordà, Spain; Clay – $115,000 – 32S/8Q/8D; Singles – Doubles	(United States) Caroline Dolehide; Diana Shnaider; 7–6^{(7–5)}, 6–3	(Spain) Aliona Bolsova (Spain) Rebeka Masarova	(Spain) Rebeka Masarova (Argentina) María Lourdes Carlé	(Argentina) Nadia Podoroska (Slovenia) Kaja Juvan (United States) Caroline Dolehide (Switzerland) Jil Teichmann
June 12	BBVA Open Internacional de Valencia; Valencia, Spain; Clay – $115,000 – 32S/15Q/7D; Singles – Doubles	(Egypt) Mayar Sherif; 6–3, 6–3	(Spain) Marina Bassols Ribera	(Argentina) Nadia Podoroska (Germany) Tamara Korpatsch	(United States) Ann Li (Sweden) Mirjam Björklund (Italy) Sara Errani (Spain) Jéssica Bouzas Maneiro
June 12	BBVA Open Internacional de Valencia; Valencia, Spain; Clay – $115,000 – 32S/15Q/7D; Singles – Doubles	(Spain) Aliona Bolsova (Venezuela) Andrea Gámiz; 6–4, 4–6, [10–7]	Angelina Gabueva; Irina Khromacheva	(Argentina) Nadia Podoroska (Germany) Tamara Korpatsch	(United States) Ann Li (Sweden) Mirjam Björklund (Italy) Sara Errani (Spain) Jéssica Bouzas Maneiro
June 19	Veneto Open Confindustria Estt; Gaiba, Italy; Grass – $115,000 – 32S/16D; Singles – Doubles	(United States) Ashlyn Krueger; 3–6, 6–4, 7–5	(Germany) Tatjana Maria	(Serbia) Olga Danilović (United States) Robin Montgomery	(Belgium) Yanina Wickmayer (China) Yuan Yue (Belgium) Ysaline Bonaventure (Italy) Lucrezia Stefanini
June 19	Veneto Open Confindustria Estt; Gaiba, Italy; Grass – $115,000 – 32S/16D; Singles – Doubles	(South Korea) Han Na-lae (South Korea) Jang Su-jeong; 6–3, 3–6, [10–6]	(Poland) Weronika Falkowska (Poland) Katarzyna Piter	(Serbia) Olga Danilović (United States) Robin Montgomery	(Belgium) Yanina Wickmayer (China) Yuan Yue (Belgium) Ysaline Bonaventure (Italy) Lucrezia Stefanini
July 10	Grand Est Open 88; Contrexéville, France; Clay – $115,000 – 32S/12Q/8D; Singles – Doubles	(Netherlands) Arantxa Rus; 6–3, 6–3	Anastasia Pavlyuchenkova	(Czech Republic) Tereza Martincová (France) Fiona Ferro	(Germany) Anna-Lena Friedsam (Italy) Sara Errani (Germany) Eva Lys (Spain) Cristina Bucșa
July 10	Grand Est Open 88; Contrexéville, France; Clay – $115,000 – 32S/12Q/8D; Singles – Doubles	(Spain) Cristina Bucșa; Alena Fomina-Klotz; 4–6, 6–3, [10–7]	Amina Anshba (Czech Republic) Anastasia Dețiuc	(Czech Republic) Tereza Martincová (France) Fiona Ferro	(Germany) Anna-Lena Friedsam (Italy) Sara Errani (Germany) Eva Lys (Spain) Cristina Bucșa
July 10	Nordea Open; Båstad, Sweden; Clay – $115,000 – 32S/16D; Singles – Doubles	(Serbia) Olga Danilović; 7–6^{(7–4)}, 3–6, 6–3	(United States) Emma Navarro	(United States) Louisa Chirico (Kazakhstan) Yulia Putintseva	(Slovenia) Tamara Zidanšek (United States) Claire Liu (Bulgaria) Viktoriya Tomova (Spain) Aliona Bolsova
July 10	Nordea Open; Båstad, Sweden; Clay – $115,000 – 32S/16D; Singles – Doubles	Irina Khromacheva (Hungary) Panna Udvardy; 4–6, 6–3, [10–5]	(Japan) Eri Hozumi (South Korea) Jang Su-jeong	(United States) Louisa Chirico (Kazakhstan) Yulia Putintseva	(Slovenia) Tamara Zidanšek (United States) Claire Liu (Bulgaria) Viktoriya Tomova (Spain) Aliona Bolsova
July 17	BCR Iași Open; Iași, Romania; Clay – $115,000 – 32S/16Q/8D; Singles – Doubles	(Romania) Ana Bogdan; 6–2, 6–3	(Romania) Irina-Camelia Begu	(Slovenia) Tamara Zidanšek (Cyprus) Raluca Șerban	(Switzerland) Jil Teichmann; Darya Astakhova (Brazil) Laura Pigossi (Switzerland) Simona Waltert
July 17	BCR Iași Open; Iași, Romania; Clay – $115,000 – 32S/16Q/8D; Singles – Doubles	(Slovenia) Veronika Erjavec (Slovenia) Dalila Jakupović; 6–4, 6–4	(Romania) Irina Bara (Romania) Monica Niculescu	(Slovenia) Tamara Zidanšek (Cyprus) Raluca Șerban	(Switzerland) Jil Teichmann; Darya Astakhova (Brazil) Laura Pigossi (Switzerland) Simona Waltert
August 7	Polish Open; Grodzisk Mazowiecki, Poland; Hard – $115,000 – 32S/16Q/16D; Singles – Doubles	(Ukraine) Dayana Yastremska; 2–6, 6–1, 6–3	(Belgium) Greet Minnen	(Poland) Maja Chwalińska (Turkey) Zeynep Sönmez	(Poland) Martyna Kubka (Germany) Eva Lys (Czech Republic) Tereza Martincová (Germany) Noma Noha Akugue
August 7	Polish Open; Grodzisk Mazowiecki, Poland; Hard – $115,000 – 32S/16Q/16D; Singles – Doubles	(Poland) Katarzyna Kawa (France) Elixane Lechemia; 6–3, 6–4	(United Kingdom) Naiktha Bains (United Kingdom) Maia Lumsden	(Poland) Maja Chwalińska (Turkey) Zeynep Sönmez	(Poland) Martyna Kubka (Germany) Eva Lys (Czech Republic) Tereza Martincová (Germany) Noma Noha Akugue
August 14	Golden Gate Open; Stanford, United States; Hard – $160,000 – 32S/16Q/16D; Singles – Doubles	(China) Wang Yafan; 6–2, 6–0	Kamilla Rakhimova	(Japan) Moyuka Uchijima (China) Yuan Yue	(Japan) Mai Hontama (United Kingdom) Jodie Burrage (China) Bai Zhuoxuan; Iryna Shymanovich
August 14	Golden Gate Open; Stanford, United States; Hard – $160,000 – 32S/16Q/16D; Singles – Doubles	(United Kingdom) Jodie Burrage (Australia) Olivia Gadecki; 7–6^{(7–4)}, 6–7^{(6–8)}, [10–8]	(United States) Hailey Baptiste (United States) Claire Liu	(Japan) Moyuka Uchijima (China) Yuan Yue	(Japan) Mai Hontama (United Kingdom) Jodie Burrage (China) Bai Zhuoxuan; Iryna Shymanovich
August 14	Barranquilla Open; Barranquilla, Colombia; Hard – $115,000 – 32S/8Q/8D; Singles – Doubles	(Germany) Tatjana Maria; 6–1, 6–2	(France) Fiona Ferro	(United States) Varvara Lepchenko (Slovakia) Anna Karolína Schmiedlová	(Australia) Daria Saville (France) Carole Monnet (Romania) Irina Fetecău (Brazil) Laura Pigossi
August 14	Barranquilla Open; Barranquilla, Colombia; Hard – $115,000 – 32S/8Q/8D; Singles – Doubles	(Greece) Valentini Grammatikopoulou (Greece) Despina Papamichail; 7–6^{(7–2)}, 7–5	(Colombia) Yuliana Lizarazo (Colombia) María Paulina Pérez García	(United States) Varvara Lepchenko (Slovakia) Anna Karolína Schmiedlová	(Australia) Daria Saville (France) Carole Monnet (Romania) Irina Fetecău (Brazil) Laura Pigossi
August 21	Chicago Women's Open; Chicago, United States; Hard – $115,000 – 32S/16Q/8D; Singles – Doubles	(Bulgaria) Viktoriya Tomova; 6–1, 6–4	(United States) Claire Liu	(Italy) Lucia Bronzetti (Spain) Cristina Bucșa	(Ukraine) Kateryna Baindl; Kamilla Rakhimova (Spain) Rebeka Masarova (Sweden) Rebecca Peterson
August 21	Chicago Women's Open; Chicago, United States; Hard – $115,000 – 32S/16Q/8D; Singles – Doubles	(Norway) Ulrikke Eikeri (Estonia) Ingrid Neel; Walkover	(Spain) Cristina Bucșa; Alexandra Panova	(Italy) Lucia Bronzetti (Spain) Cristina Bucșa	(Ukraine) Kateryna Baindl; Kamilla Rakhimova (Spain) Rebeka Masarova (Sweden) Rebecca Peterson
September 4	Open Delle Puglie; Bari, Italy; Clay – $115,000 – 32S/8Q/16D; Singles – Doubles	(Slovenia) Tamara Zidanšek; 3–6, 7–5, 6–1	(Slovakia) Rebecca Šramková	(France) Alizé Cornet (Croatia) Jana Fett	(Italy) Jennifer Ruggeri (Poland) Katarzyna Kawa (Turkey) Zeynep Sönmez (Romania) Jaqueline Cristian
September 4	Open Delle Puglie; Bari, Italy; Clay – $115,000 – 32S/8Q/16D; Singles – Doubles	(Poland) Katarzyna Kawa (Czech Republic) Anna Sisková; 6–1, 6–2	(Greece) Valentini Grammatikopoulou (France) Elixane Lechemia	(France) Alizé Cornet (Croatia) Jana Fett	(Italy) Jennifer Ruggeri (Poland) Katarzyna Kawa (Turkey) Zeynep Sönmez (Romania) Jaqueline Cristian
September 11	WTA Zavarovalnica Sava Ljubljana; Ljubljana, Slovenia; Clay – $115,000 – 32S/8Q/16D; Singles – Doubles	(Spain) Marina Bassols Ribera; 6–0, 7–6^{(7–2)}	(Turkey) Zeynep Sönmez	(Slovenia) Tamara Zidanšek (Romania) Miriam Bulgaru	(Poland) Katarzyna Kawa; Erika Andreeva (Hungary) Dalma Gálfi (Croatia) Lucija Ćirić Bagarić
September 11	WTA Zavarovalnica Sava Ljubljana; Ljubljana, Slovenia; Clay – $115,000 – 32S/8Q/16D; Singles – Doubles	Amina Anshba (United States) Quinn Gleason; 6–3, 6–4	(United Kingdom) Freya Christie (Colombia) Yuliana Lizarazo	(Slovenia) Tamara Zidanšek (Romania) Miriam Bulgaru	(Poland) Katarzyna Kawa; Erika Andreeva (Hungary) Dalma Gálfi (Croatia) Lucija Ćirić Bagarić
September 11	Țiriac Foundation Trophy; Bucharest, Romania; Clay – $115,000 – 32S/16Q/8D; Singles – Doubles	(Australia) Astra Sharma; 0–6, 7–5, 6–2	(Italy) Sara Errani	(Romania) Jaqueline Cristian (Latvia) Darja Semeņistaja	(Hungary) Anna Bondár (Argentina) María Lourdes Carlé (Germany) Noma Noha Akugue (Romania) Anca Alexia Todoni
September 11	Țiriac Foundation Trophy; Bucharest, Romania; Clay – $115,000 – 32S/16Q/8D; Singles – Doubles	(Italy) Angelica Moratelli (Italy) Camilla Rosatello; 7–5, 6–4	(Greece) Valentini Grammatikopoulou (Czech Republic) Anna Sisková	(Romania) Jaqueline Cristian (Latvia) Darja Semeņistaja	(Hungary) Anna Bondár (Argentina) María Lourdes Carlé (Germany) Noma Noha Akugue (Romania) Anca Alexia Todoni
September 18	Parma Ladies Open; Parma, Italy; Clay – $115,000 – 32S/8Q/16D; Singles – Doubles	(Romania) Ana Bogdan; 7–5, 6–1	(Slovakia) Anna Karolína Schmiedlová	(Poland) Katarzyna Kawa (Hungary) Anna Bondár	(Slovenia) Kaja Juvan (Spain) Jéssica Bouzas Maneiro (Bulgaria) Viktoriya Tomova (Romania) Jaqueline Cristian
September 18	Parma Ladies Open; Parma, Italy; Clay – $115,000 – 32S/8Q/16D; Singles – Doubles	(Slovenia) Dalila Jakupović; Irina Khromacheva; 6–2, 6–3	(Hungary) Anna Bondár (Belgium) Kimberley Zimmermann	(Poland) Katarzyna Kawa (Hungary) Anna Bondár	(Slovenia) Kaja Juvan (Spain) Jéssica Bouzas Maneiro (Bulgaria) Viktoriya Tomova (Romania) Jaqueline Cristian
October 9	Open de Rouen Capfinances; Rouen, France; Hard (i) – $115,000 – 32S/8Q/16D; Singles – Doubles	(Switzerland) Viktorija Golubic; 6–4, 6–1	Erika Andreeva	(Romania) Jaqueline Cristian (France) Alizé Cornet	(Belgium) Greet Minnen (France) Fiona Ferro (United Kingdom) Jodie Burrage (Spain) Nuria Párrizas Díaz
October 9	Open de Rouen Capfinances; Rouen, France; Hard (i) – $115,000 – 32S/8Q/16D; Singles – Doubles	(United Kingdom) Maia Lumsden (France) Jessika Ponchet; 6–3, 7–6^{(7–4)}	(Hungary) Anna Bondár (Belgium) Kimberley Zimmermann	(Romania) Jaqueline Cristian (France) Alizé Cornet	(Belgium) Greet Minnen (France) Fiona Ferro (United Kingdom) Jodie Burrage (Spain) Nuria Párrizas Díaz
October 23	Abierto Tampico; Tampico, Mexico; Hard – $115,000 – 32S/7Q/13D; Singles – Doubles	(United States) Emina Bektas; 6–3, 3–6, 7–6^{(7–3)}	Anna Kalinskaya	Kamilla Rakhimova (United States) Elizabeth Mandlik	(United States) Caroline Dolehide; Anastasia Tikhonova (United States) Katie Volynets (Mexico) Fernanda Contreras Gómez
October 23	Abierto Tampico; Tampico, Mexico; Hard – $115,000 – 32S/7Q/13D; Singles – Doubles	Kamilla Rakhimova; Anastasia Tikhonova; 7–6^{(7–5)}, 6–2	(United States) Sabrina Santamaria (United Kingdom) Heather Watson	Kamilla Rakhimova (United States) Elizabeth Mandlik	(United States) Caroline Dolehide; Anastasia Tikhonova (United States) Katie Volynets (Mexico) Fernanda Contreras Gómez
October 30	Dow Tennis Classic; Midland, United States; Hard (i) – $115,000 – 32S/16Q/16D; Singles – Doubles	Anna Kalinskaya; 7–5, 6–4	(Croatia) Jana Fett	(United States) Emma Navarro (United States) Alycia Parks	(United States) Emina Bektas (United States) Taylor Townsend (Canada) Katherine Sebov (United States) Hailey Baptiste
October 30	Dow Tennis Classic; Midland, United States; Hard (i) – $115,000 – 32S/16Q/16D; Singles – Doubles	(United States) Hailey Baptiste (United States) Whitney Osuigwe; 2–6, 6–2, [10–1]	(United States) Sophie Chang (United States) Ashley Lahey	(United States) Emma Navarro (United States) Alycia Parks	(United States) Emina Bektas (United States) Taylor Townsend (Canada) Katherine Sebov (United States) Hailey Baptiste
November 13	LP Open by Ind; Colina, Chile; Clay – $115,000 – 32S/8Q/16D; Singles – Doubles	(Czech Republic) Sára Bejlek; 6–2, 6–1	(France) Diane Parry	(United States) Elizabeth Mandlik (Argentina) Nadia Podoroska	(Slovenia) Polona Hercog (Ukraine) Yulia Starodubtseva (France) Léolia Jeanjean (Hungary) Panna Udvardy
November 13	LP Open by Ind; Colina, Chile; Clay – $115,000 – 32S/8Q/16D; Singles – Doubles	(Germany) Julia Lohoff (Switzerland) Conny Perrin; 7–6^{(7–4)}, 6–2	(Peru) Lucciana Pérez Alarcón (Chile) Daniela Seguel	(United States) Elizabeth Mandlik (Argentina) Nadia Podoroska	(Slovenia) Polona Hercog (Ukraine) Yulia Starodubtseva (France) Léolia Jeanjean (Hungary) Panna Udvardy
November 20	MundoTenis Open; Florianópolis, Brazil; Clay – $115,000 – 32S/16Q/16D; Singles – Doubles	(Australia) Ajla Tomljanović; 6–1, 7–5	(Argentina) Martina Capurro Taborda	(Mexico) Renata Zarazúa (Argentina) Nadia Podoroska	(Romania) Miriam Bulgaru (Czech Republic) Sára Bejlek (Romania) Anca Todoni (France) Carole Monnet
November 20	MundoTenis Open; Florianópolis, Brazil; Clay – $115,000 – 32S/16Q/16D; Singles – Doubles	(Italy) Sara Errani (France) Léolia Jeanjean; 7–5, 3–6, [10–7]	(Germany) Julia Lohoff (Switzerland) Conny Perrin	(Mexico) Renata Zarazúa (Argentina) Nadia Podoroska	(Romania) Miriam Bulgaru (Czech Republic) Sára Bejlek (Romania) Anca Todoni (France) Carole Monnet
November 27	IEB+ Argentina Open; Buenos Aires, Argentina; Clay – $115,000 – 32S/16Q/16D; Singles – Doubles	(Brazil) Laura Pigossi; 6–3, 6–2	(Argentina) María Lourdes Carlé	(Argentina) Julia Riera (Mexico) Renata Zarazúa	(France) Diane Parry (Slovenia) Polona Hercog (United States) Elizabeth Mandlik (Argentina) Solana Sierra
November 27	IEB+ Argentina Open; Buenos Aires, Argentina; Clay – $115,000 – 32S/16Q/16D; Singles – Doubles	(Argentina) María Lourdes Carlé (Greece) Despina Papamichail; 6–3, 4–6, [11–9]	(Colombia) María Paulina Pérez García (United States) Sofia Sewing	(Argentina) Julia Riera (Mexico) Renata Zarazúa	(France) Diane Parry (Slovenia) Polona Hercog (United States) Elizabeth Mandlik (Argentina) Solana Sierra
November 27	Creand Andorrà Open; Andorra la Vella, Andorra; Hard (i) – $115,000 – 32S/8D; Singles – Doubles	(Spain) Marina Bassols Ribera; 7–5, 7–6^{(7–3)}	Erika Andreeva	(United Kingdom) Heather Watson (France) Alizé Cornet	(Germany) Ella Seidel (France) Jessika Ponchet (Latvia) Anastasija Sevastova (Denmark) Clara Tauson
November 27	Creand Andorrà Open; Andorra la Vella, Andorra; Hard (i) – $115,000 – 32S/8D; Singles – Doubles	Erika Andreeva (Switzerland) Céline Naef; 6–2, 6–1	(Hungary) Tímea Babos (United Kingdom) Heather Watson	(United Kingdom) Heather Watson (France) Alizé Cornet	(Germany) Ella Seidel (France) Jessika Ponchet (Latvia) Anastasija Sevastova (Denmark) Clara Tauson
December 4	Montevideo Open; Montevideo, Uruguay; Clay – $115,000 – 32S/16Q/16D; Singles – Doubles	(Mexico) Renata Zarazúa; 7–5, 3–6, 6–4	(France) Diane Parry	(United States) Robin Montgomery (Argentina) María Lourdes Carlé	(Argentina) Solana Sierra (Switzerland) Ylena In-Albon (Argentina) Julia Riera (Romania) Miriam Bulgaru
December 4	Montevideo Open; Montevideo, Uruguay; Clay – $115,000 – 32S/16Q/16D; Singles – Doubles	(Argentina) María Lourdes Carlé (Argentina) Julia Riera; 7–6^{(7–5)}, 7–5	(United Kingdom) Freya Christie (Colombia) Yuliana Lizarazo	(United States) Robin Montgomery (Argentina) María Lourdes Carlé	(Argentina) Solana Sierra (Switzerland) Ylena In-Albon (Argentina) Julia Riera (Romania) Miriam Bulgaru
December 4	Open P2I Angers Arena Loire; Angers, France; Hard (i) – $115,000 – 32S/8Q/8D; Singles – Doubles	(France) Clara Burel; 3–6, 6–4, 6–2	(France) Chloé Paquet	(Spain) Cristina Bucșa (Ukraine) Dayana Yastremska	(Italy) Elisabetta Cocciaretto (France) Audrey Albié (United States) McCartney Kessler; Erika Andreeva
December 4	Open P2I Angers Arena Loire; Angers, France; Hard (i) – $115,000 – 32S/8Q/8D; Singles – Doubles	(Spain) Cristina Bucșa (Romania) Monica Niculescu; 6–1, 6–3	(Kazakhstan) Anna Danilina; Alexandra Panova	(Spain) Cristina Bucșa (Ukraine) Dayana Yastremska	(Italy) Elisabetta Cocciaretto (France) Audrey Albié (United States) McCartney Kessler; Erika Andreeva
December 11	Open BLS de Limoges; Limoges, France; Hard (i) – $115,000 – 32S/7Q/8D; Singles – Doubles	(Spain) Cristina Bucșa; 2–6, 6–1, 6–2	(France) Elsa Jacquemot	Erika Andreeva; Anna Blinkova	(Italy) Elisabetta Cocciaretto (Latvia) Anastasija Sevastova (France) Loïs Boisson (France) Harmony Tan
December 11	Open BLS de Limoges; Limoges, France; Hard (i) – $115,000 – 32S/7Q/8D; Singles – Doubles	(Spain) Cristina Bucșa; Yana Sizikova; 6–4, 6–1	(Georgia (country)) Oksana Kalashnikova (United Kingdom) Maia Lumsden	Erika Andreeva; Anna Blinkova	(Italy) Elisabetta Cocciaretto (Latvia) Anastasija Sevastova (France) Loïs Boisson (France) Harmony Tan

== Statistical information ==
These tables present the number of singles (S) and doubles (D) titles won by each player and each nation during the season. The players/nations are sorted by: 1) total number of titles (a doubles title won by two players representing the same nation counts as only one win for the nation); 2) a singles > doubles hierarchy; 3) alphabetical order (by family names for players).

To avoid confusion and double counting, these tables should be updated only after an event is completed.

=== Titles won by player ===
Total	Player	S	D	S	D
4	Cristina Bucșa (ESP)	●	● ● ●	1	3
3	Katarzyna Kawa (POL)		● ● ●	0	3
3	Ingrid Neel (EST)		● ● ●	0	3
2	Marina Bassols Ribera (ESP)	● ●		2	0
2	Ana Bogdan (ROU)	● ●		2	0
2	Arantxa Rus (NED)	● ●		2	0
2	Mayar Sherif (EGY)	● ●		2	0
2	Aliona Bolsova (ESP)		● ●	0	2
2	María Lourdes Carlé (ARG)		● ●	0	2
2	Andrea Gámiz (VEN)		● ●	0	2
2	Dalila Jakupović (SLO)		● ●	0	2
2	Irina Khromacheva (Note: As of 1 March 2022, the ATP and WTA announced that players from Russia and Belarus will not compete in tournaments under the name or flag of Russia or Belarus due to the Russian invasion of Ukraine.)		● ●	0	2
2	Despina Papamichail (GRE)		● ●	0	2
1	Sára Bejlek (CZE)	●		1	0
1	Emina Bektas (USA)	●		1	0
1	Clara Burel (FRA)	●		1	0
1	Sorana Cîrstea (ROU)	●		1	0
1	Elisabetta Cocciaretto (ITA)	●		1	0
1	Olga Danilović (SRB)	●		1	0
1	Viktorija Golubic (SUI)	●		1	0
1	Anna Kalinskaya	●		1	0
1	Ashlyn Krueger (USA)	●		1	0
1	Tatjana Maria (GER)	●		1	0
1	Jasmine Paolini (ITA)	●		1	0
1	Diane Parry (FRA)	●		1	0
1	Laura Pigossi (BRA)	●		1	0
1	Nadia Podoroska (ARG)	●		1	0
1	Astra Sharma (AUS)	●		1	0
1	Sloane Stephens (USA)	●		1	0
1	Ajla Tomljanović (AUS)	●		1	0
1	Viktoriya Tomova (BUL)	●		1	0
1	Wang Yafan (CHN)	●		1	0
1	Dayana Yastremska (UKR)	●		1	0
1	Renata Zarazúa (MEX)	●		1	0
1	Tamara Zidanšek (SLO)	●		1	0
1	Erika Andreeva		●	0	1
1	Amina Anshba		●	0	1
1	Hailey Baptiste (USA)		●	0	1
1	Jodie Burrage (GBR)		●	0	1
1	Anna Danilina (KAZ)		●	0	1
1	Caroline Dolehide (USA)		●	0	1
1	Ulrikke Eikeri (NOR)		●	0	1
1	Veronika Erjavec (SLO)		●	0	1
1	Sara Errani (ITA)		●	0	1
1	Weronika Falkowska (POL)		●	0	1
1	Alena Fomina-Klotz		●	0	1
1	Olivia Gadecki (AUS)		●	0	1
1	Quinn Gleason (USA)		●	0	1
1	Valentini Grammatikopoulou (GRE)		●	0	1
1	Han Na-lae (KOR)		●	0	1
1	Vivian Heisen (GER)		●	0	1
1	Storm Hunter (AUS)		●	0	1
1	Jang Su-jeong (KOR)		●	0	1
1	Léolia Jeanjean (FRA)		●	0	1
1	Elixane Lechemia (FRA)		●	0	1
1	Julia Lohoff (GER)		●	0	1
1	Maia Lumsden (GBR)		●	0	1
1	Greet Minnen (BEL)		●	0	1
1	Angelica Moratelli (ITA)		●	0	1
1	Céline Naef (SUI)		●	0	1
1	Monica Niculescu (ROU)		●	0	1
1	Whitney Osuigwe (USA)		●	0	1
1	Ellen Perez (AUS)		●	0	1
1	Conny Perrin (SUI)		●	0	1
1	Jessika Ponchet (FRA)		●	0	1
1	Kamilla Rakhimova		●	0	1
1	Julia Riera (ARG)		●	0	1
1	Camilla Rosatello (ITA)		●	0	1
1	Bibiane Schoofs (NED)		●	0	1
1	Diana Shnaider		●	0	1
1	Anna Sisková (CZE)		●	0	1
1	Yana Sizikova		●	0	1
1	Anastasia Tikhonova		●	0	1
1	Panna Udvardy (HUN)		●	0	1
1	Wu Fang-hsien (TPE)		●	0	1
1	Vera Zvonareva		●	0	1

=== Titles won by nation ===
Total	Nation	S	D
8	Spain (ESP)	3	5
6	United States (USA)	3	3
5	France (FRA)	2	3
4	Romania (ROU)	3	1
4	Australia (AUS)	2	2
4	Italy (ITA)	2	2
3	Netherlands (NED)	2	1
3	Argentina (ARG)	1	2
3	Germany (GER)	1	2
3	Slovenia (SLO)	1	2
3	Switzerland (SUI)	1	2
3	Estonia (EST)	0	3
3	Poland (POL)	0	3
2	Egypt (EGY)	2	0
2	Czech Republic (CZE)	1	1
2	Great Britain (GBR)	0	2
2	Greece (GRE)	0	2
2	Venezuela (VEN)	0	2
1	Brazil (BRA)	1	0
1	Bulgaria (BUL)	1	0
1	China (CHN)	1	0
1	Mexico (MEX)	1	0
1	Serbia (SRB)	1	0
1	Ukraine (UKR)	1	0
1	Belgium (BEL)	0	1
1	Chinese Taipei (TPE)	0	1
1	Hungary (HUN)	0	1
1	Kazakhstan (KAZ)	0	1
1	Norway (NOR)	0	1
1	South Korea (KOR)	0	1

== Points distribution ==
Event	W	F	SF	QF	R16	R32	Q	Q2	Q1
Singles	160	95	57	29	15	1	6	4	1
Doubles (16D)	160	95	57	29	1	—	—	—	—
Doubles (8D)	160	95	57	1	—	—	—	—	—

== See also ==
- 2023 WTA Tour
- 2023 ITF Women's World Tennis Tour
- 2023 ATP Challenger Tour
