= 2024 Torneig Internacional de Tennis Femení Solgironès – Singles =

Tennis tournament

Singles
- 2024 Torneig Internacional de Tennis Femení Solgironès

Final
- Champion: (Argentina) María Lourdes Carlé
- Runner-up: (Spain) Rebeka Masarova
- Score: 3–6, 6–1, 6–2

Details
- Draw: 32 (4 WC)
- Seeds: 8

Events
Singles	Doubles
← 2023 ·	Torneig Internacional de Tennis Femení Solgironès	· 2025 →

María Lourdes Carlé defeated Rebeka Masarova in the final, 3–6, 6–1, 6–2. to win the singles title at the 2024 Torneig Internacional de Tennis Femení Solgironès.

Arantxa Rus was the reigning champion, but did not participate this year.

== Seeds ==
1. (Belgium) Greet Minnen (first round)
2. (France) Océane Dodin (first round)
3. (China) Bai Zhuoxuan (first round)
4. (United Kingdom) Harriet Dart (first round)
5. (Spain) Rebeka Masarova (final)
6. (Argentina) María Lourdes Carlé (champion)
7. (Spain) Marina Bassols Ribera (second round, retired)
8. (Latvia) Darja Semeņistaja (first round)

== Draw ==
=== Key ===
- Q = Qualifier
- WC = Wild card
- LL = Lucky loser
- Alt = Alternate
- SE = Special exempt
- PR = Protected ranking
- ITF = ITF entry
- JE = Junior exempt
- w/o = Walkover
- r = Retired
- d = Defaulted
- SR = Special ranking

=== Finals ===
Semifinals
5	(Spain) Rebeka Masarova	6	6
(Serbia) Olga Danilović	3	2
6/WC	(Argentina) María Lourdes Carlé	6	1
(Hungary) Dalma Gálfi	1	1^{r}

Final
5	(Spain) Rebeka Masarova	6	1	2
6/WC	(Argentina) María Lourdes Carlé	3	6	6

=== Top half ===
First round
1	(Belgium) G Minnen	3	1
WC	(France) K Mladenovic	6	6
(Slovakia) R Šramková	6	7
(France) L Jeanjean	0	5
(Spain) J Bouzas Maneiro	6	6
(Germany) A-L Friedsam	4	3
(France) F Ferro	6	1	1
5	(Spain) R Masarova	2	6	6
4	(United Kingdom) H Dart	6	4	4
(France) E Jacquemot	1	6	6
(Austria) S Kraus	3	6	6
(Japan) M Uchijima	6	4	3
LL	(Romania) E-G Ruse	6	6
(Spain) N Párrizas Díaz	2	1
(Serbia) O Danilović	6	6
8	(Latvia) D Semeņistaja	3	1

Second round
WC	(France) K Mladenovic	5	6	4
(Slovakia) R Šramková	7	4	6
(Spain) J Bouzas Maneiro	3	2
5	(Spain) R Masarova	6	6
(France) E Jacquemot	6	4	6
(Austria) S Kraus	4	6	1
LL	(Romania) E-G Ruse	4	3
(Serbia) O Danilović	6	6

Quarterfinals
(Slovakia) R Šramková	2	6	2
5	(Spain) R Masarova	6	4	6
(France) E Jacquemot	6^{0}	6	3
(Serbia) O Danilović	7^{7}	3	6

Semifinals
5	(Spain) R Masarova	6	6
(Serbia) O Danilović	3	2

=== Bottom half ===
First round
6/WC	(Argentina) ML Carlé	6	6
(Czech Republic) S Bejlek	1	3
(France) C Paquet	3	6^{5}
Q	(Andorra) V Jiménez Kasintseva	6	7^{7}
Q	O Selekhmeteva	7	6
WC	(Spain) L Romero Gormaz	5	3
Q	(Poland) K Kawa	5	7	6
3	(China) Z Bai	7	5	3
7	(Spain) M Bassols Ribera	4	6	7
(Hungary) T Babos	6	1	5
(Hungary) D Gálfi	7^{7}	6
(Germany) E Seidel	6^{0}	3
Q	(Turkey) Z Sönmez	1	7^{7}	6
WC	(Spain) G Maristany	6	6^{2}	4
(Germany) E Lys	6	6
2	(France) O Dodin	4	1

Second round
6/WC	(Argentina) ML Carlé	6	1	6
Q	(Andorra) V Jiménez Kasintseva	2	6	2
Q	O Selekhmeteva	6	5	6
Q	(Poland) K Kawa	2	7	3
7	(Spain) M Bassols Ribera	0^{r}
(Hungary) D Gálfi	1
Q	(Turkey) Z Sönmez	6	3
(Germany) E Lys	0	1^{r}

Quarterfinals
6/WC	(Argentina) ML Carlé	6	6
Q	O Selekhmeteva	4	4
(Hungary) D Gálfi	6	7^{7}
Q	(Turkey) Z Sönmez	1	6^{4}

Semifinals
6/WC	(Argentina) ML Carlé	6	1
(Hungary) D Gálfi	1	1^{r}

== Qualifying ==
=== Seeds ===
1. (Romania) Elena-Gabriela Ruse (qualifying competition, retired, lucky loser)
2. (Turkey) Zeynep Sönmez (qualified)
3. (Romania) Miriam Bulgaru (qualifying competition)
4. (Poland) Katarzyna Kawa (qualified)

=== Qualifiers ===
1. Oksana Selekhmeteva
2. (Turkey) Zeynep Sönmez
3. (Andorra) Victoria Jiménez Kasintseva
4. (Poland) Katarzyna Kawa

=== Lucky loser ===
1. (Romania) Elena-Gabriela Ruse

=== Qualifying draw ===
==== First qualifier ====
Qualifying competition
1	(Romania) Elena-Gabriela Ruse	3	1^{r}
	Oksana Selekhmeteva	6	4

==== Second qualifier ====
Qualifying competition
2	(Turkey) Zeynep Sönmez	4	6	6
	(Spain) Irene Burillo Escorihuela	6	4	1

==== Third qualifier ====
Qualifying competition
3	(Romania) Miriam Bulgaru	0	5
WC	(Andorra) Victoria Jiménez Kasintseva	6	7

==== Fourth qualifier ====
Qualifying competition
4	(Poland) Katarzyna Kawa	6	1	6
WC	(Spain) Kaitlin Quevedo	4	6	3
