= 2024 Torneig Internacional de Tennis Femení Solgironès =

- Date: 1–7 April 2024
- Edition: 8th
- Category: WTA 125
- Prize money: $115,000
- Surface: Clay / Outdoor
- Location: La Bisbal d'Empordà, Spain
- Venue: Club Esportiu CT La Bisbal

Champions

Singles
- (Argentina) María Lourdes Carlé

Doubles
- (Czech Republic) Miriam Kolodziejová / (Czech Republic) Anna Sisková
← 2023 ·	Torneig Internacional de Tennis Femení Solgironès	· 2025 →

The 2024 Torneig Internacional de Tennis Femení Solgironès was a professional women's tennis tournament played on outdoor clay courts. It was the eighth edition of the tournament and second as a WTA 125 event, which was also part of the 2024 WTA 125 tournaments. It took place at Club de Tennis La Bisbal Centre Esportiu in La Bisbal d'Empordà, Spain between 1 and 7 April 2024.

== Singles main draw entrants ==
=== Seeds ===
Country	Player	Rank^{1}	Seed
BEL	Greet Minnen	70	1
FRA	Océane Dodin	77	2
CHN	Bai Zhuoxuan	85	3
GBR	Harriet Dart	88	4
ESP	Rebeka Masarova	91	5
ARG	María Lourdes Carlé	101	6
ESP	Marina Bassols Ribera	105	7
LAT	Darja Semeņistaja	108	8

- ^{1} Rankings are as of 25 March 2024.

=== Other entrants ===
The following players received wildcards into the singles main draw:

- (Argentina) María Lourdes Carlé
- (Spain) Guiomar Maristany
- (France) Kristina Mladenovic
- (Spain) Leyre Romero Gormaz

The following players received entry from the qualifying draw:

- (Andorra) Victoria Jiménez Kasintseva
- (Poland) Katarzyna Kawa
- Oksana Selekhmeteva
- (Turkey) Zeynep Sönmez

The following player received entry as a lucky loser:

- (Romania) Elena-Gabriela Ruse

=== Withdrawals ===
- (Romania) Irina-Camelia Begu → replaced by (Romania) Elena-Gabriela Ruse

== Doubles entrants ==
=== Seeds ===
Country	Player	Country	Player	Rank^{1}	Seed
	Lidziya Marozava	BEL	Kimberley Zimmermann	146	1
ITA	Angelica Moratelli	ITA	Camilla Rosatello	164	2

- ^{1} Rankings as of 25 March 2024.

=== Other entrants ===
The following team received a wildcard into the doubles main draw:

- (Hungary) Tímea Babos / (Hungary) Dalma Gálfi

The following team received entry as alternates:

- (Czech Republic) Miriam Kolodziejová / (Czech Republic) Anna Sisková

=== Withdrawals ===
- (United Kingdom) Harriet Dart / (Belgium) Greet Minnen → replaced by (Czech Republic) Miriam Kolodziejová / (Czech Republic) Anna Sisková

== Champions ==
=== Singles ===
- (Argentina) María Lourdes Carlé def. (Spain) Rebeka Masarova 3–6, 6–1, 6–2

=== Doubles ===
- (Czech Republic) Miriam Kolodziejová / (Czech Republic) Anna Sisková def. (Hungary) Tímea Babos / (Hungary) Dalma Gálfi, Walkover
