= 2023 Torneig Internacional de Tennis Femení Solgironès =

- Date: 6–11 June 2023
- Edition: 7th
- Category: WTA 125
- Prize money: $115,000
- Surface: Clay / Outdoor
- Location: La Bisbal d'Empordà, Spain
- Venue: Club Esportiu CT La Bisbal

Champions

Singles
- (Netherlands) Arantxa Rus

Doubles
- (United States) Caroline Dolehide / Diana Shnaider
← 2022 ·	Torneig Internacional de Tennis Femení Solgironès	· 2024 →

The 2023 Torneig Internacional de Tennis Femení Solgironès was a professional tennis tournament played on outdoor clay courts. It was the seventh edition of the tournament and first as a WTA 125, which is also part of the 2023 WTA 125 tournaments. It took place at Club de Tennis La Bisbal Centre Esportiu in La Bisbal d'Empordà, Spain between 6 and 11 June 2023.

== Singles main draw entrants ==
=== Seeds ===
Country	Player	Rank^{1}	Seed
ESP	Rebeka Masarova	69	1
SUI	Jil Teichmann	77	2
HUN	Panna Udvardy	97	3
USA	Caroline Dolehide	101	4
ARG	Nadia Podoroska	103	5
	Diana Shnaider	108	6
NED	Arantxa Rus	115	7
GER	Tamara Korpatsch	123	8

- ^{1} Rankings are as of 29 May 2023.

=== Other entrants ===
The following players received wildcards into the singles main draw:

- (Spain) Yvonne Cavallé Reimers
- (Spain) Ángela Fita Boluda
- Irina Khromacheva
- (Spain) Guiomar Maristany

The following players received entry from the qualifying draw:

- (Hungary) Tímea Babos
- (Spain) Lucía Cortez Llorca
- (Georgia (country)) Ekaterine Gorgodze
- (Romania) Andreea Prisăcariu

== Doubles entrants ==
=== Seeds ===
Country	Player	Country	Player	Rank^{1}	Seed
CZE	Anastasia Dețiuc	VEN	Andrea Gámiz	163	1
GEO	Ekaterine Gorgodze	GEO	Oksana Kalashnikova	179	2

- ^{1} Rankings as of 29 May 2023.

=== Other entrants ===
The following team received wildcard into the doubles main draw:

- (Romania) Andreea Prisăcariu / (Mexico) Renata Zarazúa

== Champions ==
=== Singles ===
- (Netherlands) Arantxa Rus def. (Hungary) Panna Udvardy 7–6^{(7–2)}, 6–3

=== Doubles ===
- (United States) Caroline Dolehide / Diana Shnaider def. (Spain) Aliona Bolsova / (Spain) Rebeka Masarova 7–6^{(7–5)}, 6–3
