= 2023 BBVA Open Internacional de Valencia =

- Date: 12–18 June 2023
- Edition: 3rd
- Category: WTA 125
- Prize money: $115,000
- Surface: Clay
- Location: Valencia, Spain
- Venue: Valencia Tennis Club

Champions

Singles
- (Egypt) Mayar Sherif

Doubles
- (Spain) Aliona Bolsova / (Venezuela) Andrea Gámiz
- Open Internacional de Valencia

The 2023 BBVA Open Internacional de Valencia was a professional women's tennis tournament played on outdoor clay courts. It was the third edition of the tournament and which is also part of the 2023 WTA 125 tournaments season. It took place in Valencia, Spain between 12 and 18 June 2023.

== Singles main-draw entrants ==
=== Seeds ===
Country	Player	Rank^{1}	Seed
EGY	Mayar Sherif	54	1
AUT	Julia Grabher	61	2
ITA	Sara Errani	73	3
~~USA~~	~~Emma Navarro~~	~~75~~	~~4~~
~~UKR~~	~~Kateryna Baindl~~	~~83~~	~~5~~
HUN	Panna Udvardy	97	6
USA	Caroline Dolehide	101	7
ARG	Nadia Podoroska	103	8
HUN	Anna Bondár	104	9

- ^{1} Rankings are as of 29 May 2022.

=== Other entrants ===
The following players received wildcards into the singles main draw:

- (Spain) Jéssica Bouzas Maneiro
- (Spain) Charo Esquiva Bañuls
- (Spain) Ángela Fita Boluda
- (Egypt) Mayar Sherif
- (Spain) Rosa Vicens Mas

The following players received entry from the qualifying draw:

- (Croatia) Lea Bošković
- (France) Elsa Jacquemot
- (United States) Ann Li
- (Latvia) Darja Semeņistaja

The following players received entry as lucky losers:

- Darya Astakhova
- Alena Fomina-Klotz
- (Spain) Guiomar Maristany
- (Chile) Daniela Seguel

== Doubles entrants ==
=== Seeds ===
Country	Player	Country	Player	Rank^{1}	Seed
ESP	Aliona Bolsova	VEN	Andrea Gámiz	152	1
	Angelina Gabueva		Irina Khromacheva	183	2

- ^{1} Rankings as of 29 May 2023.

=== Other entrants ===
The following team received wildcard into the doubles main draw:

- (Spain) Charo Esquiva Bañuls / (Spain) Ángela Fita Boluda

== Champions ==
=== Singles ===
- (Egypt) Mayar Sherif def. (Spain) Marina Bassols Ribera 6–3, 6–3

=== Doubles ===
- (Spain) Aliona Bolsova / (Venezuela) Andrea Gámiz def. Angelina Gabueva / Irina Khromacheva 6–4, 4–6, [10–7]
