= 2023 San Luis Open Challenger – Women's doubles =

Women's doubles
- 2023 San Luis Open Challenger

Final
- Champions: (Spain) Aliona Bolsova (Venezuela) Andrea Gámiz
- Runners-up: (Georgia (country)) Oksana Kalashnikova (Poland) Katarzyna Piter
- Score: 7–6^{(7–5)}, 6–4

Events
Singles	men	women
Doubles	men	women
San Luis Open Challenger	· 2024 →

This was the first edition of the tournament as a part of the 2023 WTA 125 tournaments.

Aliona Bolsova and Andrea Gámiz won the title, defeating Oksana Kalashnikova and Katarzyna Piter in the final, 7–6^{(7–5)}, 6–4.

== Seeds ==
1. (United Kingdom) Alicia Barnett / (United Kingdom) Olivia Nicholls (first round)
2. (Georgia (country)) Natela Dzalamidze / Kamilla Rakhimova (first round)
3. (United States) Kaitlyn Christian / (United States) Sabrina Santamaria (quarterfinals)
4. (Spain) Aliona Bolsova / (Venezuela) Andrea Gámiz (champions)

== Draw ==
=== Key ===
- Q = Qualifier
- WC = Wild card
- LL = Lucky loser
- Alt = Alternate
- SE = Special exempt
- PR = Protected ranking
- ITF = ITF entry
- JE = Junior exempt
- w/o = Walkover
- r = Retired
- d = Defaulted
- SR = Special ranking

=== Draw ===
First round
1	(United Kingdom) A Barnett (United Kingdom) O Nicholls	7	4	[0]
(Brazil) I Gamarra Martins (Chinese Taipei) F-h Wu	5	6	[10]
(United States) Q Gleason (France) E Lechemia	3	4
(United States) I Neel (Australia) O Tjandramulia	6	6
4	(Spain) A Bolsova (Venezuela) A Gámiz	7^{7}	6
(Switzerland) Y In-Albon (Hungary) RL Jani	6^{1}	3
(Greece) D Papamichail (Argentina) N Podoroska	6	3	[10]
(United States) A Rogers (Mexico) M Zacarías	3	6	[2]
(Georgia (country)) O Kalashnikova (Poland) K Piter	6	4	[10]
(Colombia) Y Lizarazo (Colombia) MP Pérez	3	6	[6]
A Gabueva (Switzerland) C Perrin	3	4
3	(United States) K Christian (United States) S Santamaria	6	6
WC	(Argentina) P Ormaechea (Mexico) AS Sánchez	5	4
(Italy) E Cocciaretto (Austria) J Grabher	7	6
L Marozava (Mexico) R Zarazúa	6	6
2	(Georgia (country)) N Dzalamidze; K Rakhimova	2	3

Quarterfinals
(Brazil) I Gamarra Martins (Chinese Taipei) F-h Wu	2	6	[10]
(United States) I Neel (Australia) O Tjandramulia	6	3	[5]
4	(Spain) A Bolsova (Venezuela) A Gámiz	w/o
(Greece) D Papamichail (Argentina) N Podoroska
(Georgia (country)) O Kalashnikova (Poland) K Piter	6	6
3	(United States) K Christian (United States) S Santamaria	2	4
(Italy) E Cocciaretto (Austria) J Grabher	4	1^{r}
L Marozava (Mexico) R Zarazúa	6	2

Semifinals
(Brazil) I Gamarra Martins (Chinese Taipei) F-h Wu	3	1
4	(Spain) A Bolsova (Venezuela) A Gámiz	6	6
(Georgia (country)) O Kalashnikova (Poland) K Piter	6	1	[13]
L Marozava (Mexico) R Zarazúa	4	6	[11]

Final
4	(Spain) A Bolsova (Venezuela) A Gámiz	7^{7}	6
(Georgia (country)) O Kalashnikova (Poland) K Piter	6^{5}	4
