= 2023 Zavarovalnica Sava Ljubljana =

- Date: 11–17 September
- Edition: first
- Category: WTA 125
- Draw: 32S / 16D
- Prize money: $115,000
- Surface: Clay
- Location: Ljubljana, Slovenia
- Venue: Tivoli Tennis Center

Champions

Singles
- (Spain) Marina Bassols Ribera

Doubles
- Amina Anshba / (United States) Quinn Gleason
← 2022 ·	Ljubljana Open	· 2024 →

The 2023 WTA Zavarovalnica Sava Ljubljana was a professional women's tennis tournament played on outdoor clay courts. It was the first edition of the tournament and part of the 2023 WTA 125 tournaments, offering a total of $115,000 in prize money. It took place at the Tivoli Tennis Center in Ljubljana, Slovenia between 11 and 17 September 2023. However, the centre court action was organized at the Mima Jaušovec Court, placed in the middle of the Republic Square.

== Singles entrants ==
=== Seeds ===
Country	Player	Rank^{1}	Seed
SVK	Anna Karolína Schmiedlová	64	1
ESP	Aliona Bolsova	113	2
HUN	Dalma Gálfi	116	3
SLO	Tamara Zidanšek	118	4
ESP	Marina Bassols Ribera	136	5
SLO	Kaja Juvan	145	6
CYP	Raluca Șerban	156	7
	Erika Andreeva	160	8

- ^{1} Rankings are as of 28 August 2023.

=== Other entrants ===
The following players received a wildcard into the singles main draw:

- (Slovenia) Živa Falkner
- (Slovenia) Pia Lovrič
- (Slovenia) Ela Nala Milić
- (Hungary) Natália Szabanin

The following players received entry into the main draw through qualification:

- (Czech Republic) Michaela Bayerlová
- (Czech Republic) Gabriela Knutson
- (United States) Ashley Lahey
- (Ukraine) Oleksandra Oliynykova

The following players received entry as lucky losers:

- (Venezuela) Andrea Gámiz
- (Hungary) Réka Luca Jani

=== Withdrawals ===
Before the tournament

- (Hungary) Anna Bondár → replaced by (Hungary) Réka Luca Jani
- (France) Alizé Cornet → replaced by (Greece) Sapfo Sakellaridi
- (Slovenia) Veronika Erjavec → replaced by (Venezuela) Andrea Gámiz
- (Austria) Julia Grabher → replaced by (Serbia) Lola Radivojević
- (Spain) Nuria Párrizas Díaz → replaced by (Romania) Miriam Bulgaru

== Doubles entrants ==
=== Seeds ===
Country	Player	Country	Player	Rank	Seed
ESP	Aliona Bolsova	VEN	Andrea Gámiz	160	1
POL	Weronika Falkowska	POL	Katarzyna Kawa	191	2
	Amina Anshba	USA	Quinn Gleason	209	3
GBR	Freya Christie	COL	Yuliana Lizarazo	232	4

- Rankings as of 4 September 2023.

=== Other entrants ===
The following pair received a wildcard into the doubles main draw:

- (Slovenia) Ela Nala Milić / (Slovenia) Nina Potočnik

The following pair received entry as alternates:

- (Czech Republic) Denisa Hindová / (Czech Republic) Karolína Kubáňová

=== Withdrawals ===
- (Croatia) Lucija Ćirić Bagarić / (Serbia) Lola Radivojević → replaced by (Czech Republic) Denisa Hindová / (Czech Republic) Karolína Kubáňová

== Champions ==
=== Singles ===
- (Spain) Marina Bassols Ribera def. (Turkey) Zeynep Sönmez 6–0, 7–6^{(7–2)}

=== Doubles ===
- Amina Anshba / (United States) Quinn Gleason def. (United Kingdom) Freya Christie / (Colombia) Yuliana Lizarazo 6–3, 6–4
