= 2023 Catalonia Open =

2023 tennis tournament

- Date: 2–7 May
- Edition: 1st
- Category: WTA 125
- Draw: 32S / 12D
- Prize money: $115,000
- Surface: Clay
- Location: Reus, Spain
- Venue: Club Tennis Reus Monterols

Champions

Singles
- (Romania) Sorana Cîrstea

Doubles
- (Australia) Storm Hunter / (Australia) Ellen Perez
- Catalonia Open

The 2023 Catalonia Open was a professional tennis tournament played on outdoor clay courts. It was the first edition of the tournament and part of the 2023 WTA 125 tournaments, offering a total of $115,000 in prize money. It took place at the Club Tennis Reus Monterols in Reus, Tarragona, Spain between 2 and 7 May 2023.

== Singles entrants ==
=== Seeds ===
Country	Player	Rank^{1}	Seed
SUI	Jil Teichmann	30	1
ROU	Sorana Cîrstea	44	2
USA	Lauren Davis	56	3
CHN	Wang Xinyu	60	4
	Anna Blinkova	65	5
ITA	Jasmine Paolini	68	6
USA	Caty McNally	69	7
FRA	Alizé Cornet	71	8

- ^{1} Rankings are as of 24 April 2023.

=== Other entrants ===
The following players received a wildcard into the singles main draw:

- (Spain) Aliona Bolsova
- (Spain) Irene Burillo Escorihuela
- (Romania) Sorana Cîrstea
- (Spain) Carlota Martínez Círez
- (Spain) Leyre Romero Gormaz
- (Switzerland) Jil Teichmann

The following players received entry into the main draw through qualification:

- Erika Andreeva
- (Colombia) Emiliana Arango
- (Spain) Ángela Fita Boluda
- (United States) Elizabeth Mandlik

=== Withdrawals ===
- (Ukraine) Kateryna Baindl → replaced by (Spain) Sara Sorribes Tormo
- (Italy) Sara Errani → replaced by (Switzerland) Ylena In-Albon
- Anna Kalinskaya → replaced by (Ukraine) Dayana Yastremska
- (Canada) Rebecca Marino → replaced by (Netherlands) Arantxa Rus
- (Spain) Rebeka Masarova → replaced by (Japan) Moyuka Uchijima
- (Sweden) Rebecca Peterson → replaced by (Sweden) Mirjam Björklund
- (United States) Alison Riske-Amritraj → replaced by (Denmark) Clara Tauson
- (Egypt) Mayar Sherif → replaced by (Spain) Marina Bassols Ribera
- (China) Wang Xiyu → replaced by (Argentina) Nadia Podoroska

== Doubles entrants ==
=== Seeds ===
Country	Player	Country	Player	Rank	Seed
AUS	Storm Hunter	AUS	Ellen Perez	27	1
CHI	Alexa Guarachi	NZL	Erin Routliffe	78	2
JPN	Miyu Kato		Yana Sizikova	86	3
SPA	Aliona Bolsova	KAZ	Anna Danilina	91	4

- Rankings as of 24 April 2023.

== Champions ==
=== Singles ===
- (Romania) Sorana Cîrstea def. (United States) Elizabeth Mandlik 6–1, 4–6, 7–6^{(7–1)}

=== Doubles ===
- (Australia) Storm Hunter / (Australia) Ellen Perez def. (Chile) Alexa Guarachi / (New Zealand) Erin Routliffe 6–1, 7–6^{(10–8)}
