= 2023 MundoTenis Open =

- Date: November 20 – 26
- Edition: 1st
- Category: WTA 125
- Draw: 32S / 16D
- Prize money: $115,000
- Surface: Clay
- Location: Florianópolis, Brazil
- Venue: Super9 Tennis Park, Jurerê Internacional

Champions

Singles
- (Australia) Ajla Tomljanović

Doubles
- (Italy) Sara Errani / (France) Léolia Jeanjean
- MundoTenis Open

The 2023 MundoTênis Open was a professional women's tennis tournament played on outdoor clay courts. It was the first edition of the tournament, a WTA 125 event of the 2023 WTA 125 season that took place in Florianópolis, Brazil from November 20 to 26, 2023.

== Singles main draw entrants ==
=== Seeds ===
Country	Player	Rank^{1}	Seed
USA	Emma Navarro	33	1
	Diana Shnaider	62	2
ARG	Nadia Podoroska	78	3
ITA	Sara Errani	100	4
FRA	Diane Parry	104	5
HUN	Anna Bondár	113	6
HUN	Panna Udvardy	117	7
USA	Elizabeth Mandlik	125	8

- Rankings are as of November 13, 2023.

=== Other entrants ===
The following players received wildcards into the singles main draw:

- (Brazil) Carolina Alves
- (Brazil) Carolina Bohrer Martins
- (Brazil) Gabriela Cé
- (United States) Emma Navarro
- (Australia) Ajla Tomljanović

The following players received entry from the qualifying draw:

- (United States) Makenna Jones
- (United States) Jamie Loeb
- (Switzerland) Conny Perrin
- (Romania) Anca Todoni

== Doubles main draw entrants ==
=== Seeds ===
Country	Player	Country	Player	Rank^{1}	Seed
	Amina Anshba	USA	Quinn Gleason	194	1
~~USA~~	~~Makenna Jones~~	~~USA~~	~~Angela Kulikov~~	~~235~~	~~2~~
GBR	Freya Christie	COL	Yuliana Lizarazo	252	3
COL	María Paulina Pérez García	USA	Sofia Sewing	272	4

- Rankings are as of November 13, 2023.

== Champions ==
=== Singles ===
- (Australia) Ajla Tomljanović def. (Argentina) Martina Capurro Taborda, 6–1, 7–5

=== Doubles ===
- (Italy) Sara Errani / (France) Léolia Jeanjean def. (Germany) Julia Lohoff / (Switzerland) Conny Perrin, 7–5, 3–6, [10–7]
