= 2023 San Luis Open Challenger – Women's singles =

Women's singles
- 2023 San Luis Open Challenger

Final
- Champion: (Italy) Elisabetta Cocciaretto
- Runner-up: (Italy) Sara Errani
- Score: 5–7, 6–4, 7–5

Events
Singles	men	women
Doubles	men	women
San Luis Open Challenger	· 2024 →

This was the first edition of the tournament as a part of the 2023 WTA 125 tournaments.

Elisabetta Cocciaretto won the title, defeating Sara Errani in the final, 5–7, 6–4, 7–5.

== Seeds ==
1. (Italy) Elisabetta Cocciaretto (champion)
2. (Germany) Tatjana Maria (quarterfinals)
3. (Hungary) Dalma Gálfi (second round)
4. (Ukraine) Kateryna Baindl (first round)
5. Kamilla Rakhimova (second round)
6. (Austria) Julia Grabher (first round)
7. (Italy) Sara Errani (final)
8. (Brazil) Laura Pigossi (quarterfinals)

== Draw ==
=== Key ===
- Q = Qualifier
- WC = Wild card
- LL = Lucky loser
- Alt = Alternate
- SE = Special exempt
- PR = Protected ranking
- ITF = ITF entry
- JE = Junior exempt
- w/o = Walkover
- r = Retired
- d = Defaulted
- SR = Special ranking

=== Finals ===
Semifinals
1/WC	(Italy) Elisabetta Cocciaretto	6^{2}	6	6
Elina Avanesyan	7^{7}	1	2
(Slovenia) Kaja Juvan	6	4	2
7	(Italy) Sara Errani	1	6	6

Final
1/WC	(Italy) Elisabetta Cocciaretto	5	6	7
7	(Italy) Sara Errani	7	4	5

=== Top half ===
First round
1/WC	(Italy) E Cocciaretto	6	6
(Mexico) M Zacarías	3	0
(Argentina) P Ormaechea	2	1
(Argentina) N Podoroska	6	6
WC	(Mexico) AS Sánchez	3	4
(Slovenia) T Zidanšek	6	6
(Hungary) RL Jani	6	5	2
5	K Rakhimova	3	7	6
4	(Ukraine) K Baindl	4	5
E Avanesyan	6	7
(Canada) C Zhao	6	5	5
(Cyprus) R Șerban	4	7	7
Q	(United States) H Baptiste	2	1
(France) L Jeanjean	6	6
WC	(Colombia) E Arango	7	6^{4}	6
6	(Austria) J Grabher	5	7^{7}	4

Second round
1/WC	(Italy) E Cocciaretto	7^{10}	6
(Argentina) N Podoroska	6^{8}	1
(Slovenia) T Zidanšek	7^{7}	6
5	K Rakhimova	6^{3}	3
E Avanesyan	6	6
(Cyprus) R Șerban	4	1
(France) L Jeanjean	4	1^{r}
WC	(Colombia) E Arango	6	4

Quarterfinals
1/WC	(Italy) E Cocciaretto	6	6
(Slovenia) T Zidanšek	2	4
E Avanesyan	6	6
WC	(Colombia) E Arango	2	2

Semifinals
1/WC	(Italy) E Cocciaretto	6^{2}	6	6
E Avanesyan	7^{7}	1	2

=== Bottom half ===
First round
8	(Brazil) L Pigossi	4	6	6
Q	(Venezuela) A Gámiz	6	1	2
Q	(United States) W Osuigwe	0	3
(United States) K Scott	6	6
WC	(Mexico) R Zarazúa	6	5	5
(Slovenia) K Juvan	4	7	7
(Mexico) F Contreras Gómez	2	2
3	(Hungary) D Gálfi	6	6
7	(Italy) S Errani	6	6
(Switzerland) Y In-Albon	3	2
(Greece) D Papamichail	1	6	4
(Spain) A Bolsova	6	3	6
Q	(Switzerland) C Perrin	6^{3}	1
WC	(Mexico) MF Navarro Oliva	7^{7}	6
(Germany) E Lys	2	0
2	(Germany) T Maria	6	6

Second round
8	(Brazil) L Pigossi	6	6
(United States) K Scott	3	1
(Slovenia) K Juvan	6	6
3	(Hungary) D Gálfi	3	3
7	(Italy) S Errani	6	6
(Spain) A Bolsova	2	2
WC	(Mexico) MF Navarro Oliva	0	2
2	(Germany) T Maria	6	6

Quarterfinals
8	(Brazil) L Pigossi	6	3	4
(Slovenia) K Juvan	4	6	6
7	(Italy) S Errani	6	6
2	(Germany) T Maria	2	1

Semifinals
(Slovenia) K Juvan	6	4	2
7	(Italy) S Errani	1	6	6

== Qualifying ==
=== Seeds ===
1. (France) Carole Monnet (first round)
2. (United States) Hailey Baptiste (qualified)
3. (United States) Whitney Osuigwe (qualified)
4. (Colombia) Yuliana Lizarazo (first round)

=== Qualifiers ===
1. (Venezuela) Andrea Gámiz
2. (United States) Hailey Baptiste
3. (United States) Whitney Osuigwe
4. (Switzerland) Conny Perrin

=== Draw ===
==== First qualifier ====
Qualifying competition
1	(France) Carole Monnet	2	6^{1}
	(Venezuela) Andrea Gámiz	6	7^{7}

==== Second qualifier ====
Qualifying competition
2	(United States) Hailey Baptiste	6	6
	(United States) Quinn Gleason	1	4

==== Third qualifier ====
Qualifying competition
3	(United States) Whitney Osuigwe	6	6
	(Spain) Sandra Alonso Abril	4	3

==== Fourth qualifier ====
Qualifying competition
4	(Colombia) Yuliana Lizarazo	1	5
	(Switzerland) Conny Perrin	6	7
