= 2023 San Luis Open Challenger – Men's singles =

Men's singles
- 2023 San Luis Open Challenger

Final
- Champion: (Chile) Tomás Barrios Vera
- Runner-up: (Germany) Dominik Koepfer
- Score: 7–6^{(8–6)}, 7–5

Events
Singles	men	women
Doubles	men	women
- San Luis Open Challenger

Antoine Bellier was the defending champion but lost in the first round to Alexis Galarneau.

Tomás Barrios Vera won the title after defeating Dominik Koepfer 7–6^{(8–6)}, 7–5 in the final.

== Seeds ==
1. (Australia) James Duckworth (first round)
2. (Switzerland) Antoine Bellier (first round)
3. (Chile) Tomás Barrios Vera (champion)
4. (Argentina) Renzo Olivo (second round, retired)
5. (Argentina) Facundo Mena (first round)
6. (Japan) Rio Noguchi (first round)
7. (Argentina) Juan Pablo Ficovich (first round)
8. (Dominican Republic) Nick Hardt (first round)

== Draw ==
Key

- Q = Qualifier
- WC = Wild card
- LL = Lucky loser
- Alt = Alternate
- ITF = ITF entry
- PR = Protected ranking
- SR = Special ranking
- SE = Special exempt
- JE = Junior exempt
- JR = Junior Accelerator Programme entrant
- CO = College Accelerator Programme entrant
- NG = Next Gen Accelerator Program entrant
- w/o = Walkover
- r = Retired
- d = Defaulted

=== Finals ===
Semifinals
(United Kingdom) Jan Choinski	3	3
(Germany) Dominik Koepfer	6	6
3	(Chile) Tomás Barrios Vera	6	6
Q	(United States) Patrick Kypson	4	3

Final
(Germany) Dominik Koepfer	6^{6}	5
3	(Chile) Tomás Barrios Vera	7^{8}	7

=== Top half ===
First round
1	(Australia) J Duckworth	6^{4}	6	3
(Argentina) TA Tirante	7^{7}	4	6
(Tunisia) A Dougaz	2	2
(Argentina) F Comesaña	6	6
(Brazil) JL Reis da Silva	6	3	6
(Australia) A Walton	1	6	4
(United Kingdom) J Choinski	4	7	6
5	(Argentina) F Mena	6	5	2
4	(Argentina) R Olivo	7	6
Q	(New Zealand) R Statham	5	3
(Chinese Taipei) J Jung	0	6^{3}
(Austria) M Neuchrist	6	7^{7}
(Argentina) RA Burruchaga	1	3
(Germany) D Koepfer	6	6
Q	(Kazakhstan) D Yevseyev	7	7^{7}
8	(Dominican Republic) N Hardt	5	6^{1}

Second round
(Argentina) TA Tirante	6	6
(Argentina) F Comesaña	2	3
(Brazil) JL Reis da Silva	5	5
(United Kingdom) J Choinski	7	7
4	(Argentina) R Olivo	4	1^{r}
(Austria) M Neuchrist	6	4
(Germany) D Koepfer	6	6
Q	(Kazakhstan) D Yevseyev	3	2

Quarterfinals
(Argentina) TA Tirante	4	4
(United Kingdom) J Choinski	6	6
(Austria) M Neuchrist	6	1	4
(Germany) D Koepfer	4	6	6

Semifinals
(United Kingdom) J Choinski	3	3
(Germany) D Koepfer	6	6

=== Bottom half ===
First round
7	(Argentina) JP Ficovich	6^{4}	3
Q	(France) G Mpetshi Perricard	7^{7}	6
(Colombia) N Mejía	4	6^{5}
(Bolivia) M Dellien	6	7^{7}
(Germany) Elmar Ejupovic	6	6
WC	(France) L Pouille	3	3
Q	(United States) N Chappell	6^{5}	1
3	(Chile) T Barrios Vera	7^{7}	6
6	(Japan) R Noguchi	2	6^{5}
WC	(Mexico) R Pacheco Méndez	6	7^{7}
(Paraguay) AD Vallejo	1	3
Q	(United States) P Kypson	6	6
Q	(Zimbabwe) B Lock	6	3	5
(France) T Atmane	2	6	7
LL	(Canada) A Galarneau	6	6
2	(Switzerland) A Bellier	2	4

Second round
Q	(France) G Mpetshi Perricard	7^{7}	6
(Bolivia) M Dellien	6^{4}	3
(Germany) E Ejupovic	6	0	6^{4}
3	(Chile) T Barrios Vera	3	6	7^{7}
WC	(Mexico) R Pacheco Méndez	3	3
Q	(United States) P Kypson	6	6
(France) T Atmane	7	4	6
LL	(Canada) A Galarneau	5	6	4

Quarterfinals
Q	(France) G Mpetshi Perricard	4	6	4
3	(Chile) T Barrios Vera	6	4	6
Q	(United States) P Kypson	6	6^{5}	6
(France) T Atmane	2	7^{7}	2

Semifinals
3	(Chile) T Barrios Vera	6	6
Q	(United States) P Kypson	4	3
