= 2024 Torneig Internacional de Tennis Femení Solgironès – Doubles =

Doubles
- 2024 Torneig Internacional de Tennis Femení Solgironès

Final
- Champions: (Czech Republic) Miriam Kolodziejová (Czech Republic) Anna Sisková
- Runners-up: (Hungary) Tímea Babos (Hungary) Dalma Gálfi
- Score: Walkover

Events
Singles	Doubles
← 2023 ·	Torneig Internacional de Tennis Femení Solgironès	· 2025 →

Caroline Dolehide and Diana Shnaider were the reigning champions, but Shnaider did not participate this year and Dolehide chose to compete in Charleston instead.

Miriam Kolodziejová and Anna Sisková won the title by walkover after Tímea Babos and Dalma Gálfi withdrew from the final.

== Seeds ==
1. Lidziya Marozava / (Belgium) Kimberley Zimmermann (quarterfinals)
2. (Italy) Angelica Moratelli / (Italy) Camilla Rosatello (quarterfinals)

== Draw ==
=== Key ===
- Q = Qualifier
- WC = Wild card
- LL = Lucky loser
- Alt = Alternate
- SE = Special exempt
- PR = Protected ranking
- ITF = ITF entry
- JE = Junior exempt
- w/o = Walkover
- r = Retired
- d = Defaulted
- SR = Special ranking

=== Draw ===
Quarterfinals
1	Lidziya Marozava (Belgium) Kimberley Zimmermann	1	5
WC	(Hungary) Tímea Babos (Hungary) Dalma Gálfi	6	7
(France) Kristina Mladenovic (Latvia) Darja Semeņistaja	6	1	[10]
Amina Anshba (Czech Republic) Anastasia Dețiuc	3	6	[6]
(Germany) Anna-Lena Friedsam (Romania) Elena-Gabriela Ruse	2	4
Alt	(Czech Republic) Miriam Kolodziejová (Czech Republic) Anna Sisková	6	6
(Poland) Katarzyna Kawa (Netherlands) Bibiane Schoofs	6	2	[13]
2	(Italy) Angelica Moratelli (Italy) Camilla Rosatello	1	6	[11]

Semifinals
WC	(Hungary) Tímea Babos (Hungary) Dalma Gálfi	4	6	[10]
(France) Kristina Mladenovic (Latvia) Darja Semeņistaja	6	4	[3]
Alt	(Czech Republic) Miriam Kolodziejová (Czech Republic) Anna Sisková	6	6^{6}	[10]
(Poland) Katarzyna Kawa (Netherlands) Bibiane Schoofs	1	7^{8}	[7]

Final
WC	(Hungary) Tímea Babos (Hungary) Dalma Gálfi
Alt	(Czech Republic) Miriam Kolodziejová (Czech Republic) Anna Sisková	w/o
