= 2023 San Luis Open Challenger =

- Date: 27 March–2 April (women); 3–9 April (men)
- Edition: 35th (men); 1st (women)
- Category: WTA 125 (women); ATP Challenger 75 (men)
- Draw: 32S/16D
- Prize money: $115,000 (women) $80,000 (men)
- Surface: Clay
- Location: San Luis Potosí, Mexico
- Venue: Club Deportivo Potosino

Champions

Men's singles
- (Chile) Tomás Barrios Vera

Women's singles
- (Italy) Elisabetta Cocciaretto

Men's doubles
- (Northern Mariana Islands) Colin Sinclair / (Australia) Adam Walton

Women's doubles
- (Spain) Aliona Bolsova / (Venezuela) Andrea Gámiz
- San Luis Open Challenger Tour

The 2023 San Luis Tennis Open was a professional tennis tournament played on outdoor clay courts. It was the 35th edition of the tournament for the men which is part of the 2023 ATP Challenger Tour and 1st edition for the women which is part of the 2023 WTA 125 tournaments. It took place at the Club Deportivo Potosino in San Luis Potosí, Mexico between 27 March and 9 April 2023.

== Men's singles main-draw entrants ==
=== Seeds ===
Country	Player	Rank^{1}	Seed
AUS	James Duckworth	112	1
SUI	Antoine Bellier	175	2
CHI	Tomás Barrios Vera	183	3
ARG	Renzo Olivo	196	4
ARG	Facundo Mena	204	5
JPN	Rio Noguchi	205	6
ARG	Juan Pablo Ficovich	209	7
DOM	Nick Hardt	217	8

- ^{1} Rankings are as of 20 March 2023.

=== Other entrants ===
The following players received wildcards into the singles main draw:

- (Mexico) Rodrigo Pacheco Méndez
- (France) Lucas Pouille
- (Australia) ~~Bernard Tomic~~

The following players received entry from the qualifying draw:

- (United States) Nick Chappell
- (United States) Patrick Kypson
- (Zimbabwe) Benjamin Lock
- (France) Giovanni Mpetshi Perricard
- (New Zealand) Rubin Statham
- (Kazakhstan) Denis Yevseyev

The following player received entry as a lucky loser:

- (Canada) Alexis Galarneau

== Women's singles main-draw entrants ==
=== Seeds ===
Country	Player	Rank^{1}	Seed
ITA	Elisabetta Cocciaretto	49	1
GER	Tatjana Maria	65	2
HUN	Dalma Gálfi	79	3
UKR	Kateryna Baindl	84	4
	Kamilla Rakhimova	92	5
AUT	Julia Grabher	94	6
ITA	Sara Errani	99	7
BRA	Laura Pigossi	102	8

- ^{1} Rankings are as of 20 March 2023.

=== Other entrants ===
The following players received wildcards into the singles main draw:

- (Colombia) Emiliana Arango
- (Italy) Elisabetta Cocciaretto
- (Mexico) María Fernanda Navarro Oliva
- (Mexico) Ana Sofía Sánchez
- (Mexico) Renata Zarazúa

The following players received entry from the qualifying draw:

- (United States) Hailey Baptiste
- (Venezuela) Andrea Gámiz
- (United States) Whitney Osuigwe
- (Switzerland) Conny Perrin

=== Withdrawals ===
- (France) Alizé Cornet → replaced by Elina Avanesyan
- (Romania) Jaqueline Cristian → replaced by (Canada) Carol Zhao
- (Poland) Magdalena Fręch → replaced by (Cyprus) Raluca Șerban
- (Germany) Anna-Lena Friedsam → replaced by (United States) Katrina Scott
- (Switzerland) Viktorija Golubic → replaced by (Spain) Aliona Bolsova
- (Czech Republic) Tereza Martincová → replaced by (Greece) Despina Papamichail
- (Sweden) Rebecca Peterson → replaced by (Slovenia) Kaja Juvan
- (Italy) Lucrezia Stefanini → replaced by (Mexico) Fernanda Contreras Gómez
- (Hungary) Panna Udvardy → replaced by (Argentina) Paula Ormaechea

=== Retirements ===
- (France) Léolia Jeanjean (gastrointestinal illness)

== Women's doubles main-draw entrants ==
=== Seeds ===
Country	Player	Country	Player	Rank^{1}	Seed
GBR	Alicia Barnett	GBR	Olivia Nicholls	136	1
GEO	Natela Dzalamidze		Kamilla Rakhimova	153	2
USA	Kaitlyn Christian	USA	Sabrina Santamaria	168	3
ESP	Aliona Bolsova	VEN	Andrea Gámiz	171	4

- Rankings are as of March 20, 2023

=== Other entrants ===
The following pair received a wildcard into the doubles main draw:

- (Argentina) Paula Ormaechea / (Mexico) Ana Sofía Sánchez

=== Withdrawals ===
During the tournament

- (Greece) Despina Papamichail / (Argentina) Nadia Podoroska (Papamichail - right knee injury)

=== Retirements ===
- (Italy) Elisabetta Cocciaretto / (Austria) Julia Grabher (Grabher - left knee injury)

== Champions ==
=== Men's singles ===
- (Chile) Tomás Barrios Vera def. (Germany) Dominik Koepfer 7–6^{(8–6)}, 7–5.

=== Women's singles ===
- (Italy) Elisabetta Cocciaretto def. (Italy) Sara Errani 5–7, 6–4, 7–5

=== Men's doubles ===
- (Northern Mariana Islands) Colin Sinclair / (Australia) Adam Walton def. (Zimbabwe) Benjamin Lock / (New Zealand) Rubin Statham 5–7, 6–3, [10–5].

=== Women's doubles ===
- (Spain) Aliona Bolsova / (Venezuela) Andrea Gámiz def. (Georgia (country)) Oksana Kalashnikova / (Poland) Katarzyna Piter 7–6^{(7–5)}, 6–4
