= 2023 San Luis Open Challenger – Men's doubles =

Men's doubles
- 2023 San Luis Open Challenger

Final
- Champions: (Northern Mariana Islands) Colin Sinclair (Australia) Adam Walton
- Runners-up: (Zimbabwe) Benjamin Lock (New Zealand) Rubin Statham
- Score: 5–7, 6–3, [10–5]

Events
Singles	men	women
Doubles	men	women
- San Luis Open Challenger

Nicolás Barrientos and Miguel Ángel Reyes-Varela were the defending champions but chose not to defend their title.

Colin Sinclair and Adam Walton won the title after defeating Benjamin Lock and Rubin Statham 5–7, 6–3, [10–5] in the final.

== Seeds ==
1. (Philippines) Ruben Gonzales / (United States) Evan King (semifinals)
2. (Bolivia) Boris Arias / (Bolivia) Federico Zeballos (first round)
3. (France) Théo Arribagé / (France) Luca Sanchez (quarterfinals)
4. (Austria) Maximilian Neuchrist / (Greece) Michail Pervolarakis (quarterfinals)

== Draw ==
Key

- Q = Qualifier
- WC = Wild card
- LL = Lucky loser
- Alt = Alternate
- ITF = ITF entry
- PR = Protected ranking
- SR = Special ranking
- SE = Special exempt
- JE = Junior exempt
- JR = Junior Accelerator Programme entrant
- CO = College Accelerator Programme entrant
- NG = Next Gen Accelerator Program entrant
- w/o = Walkover
- r = Retired
- d = Defaulted

First round
1	(Philippines) R Gonzales (United States) E King	6	6
(Canada) A Galarneau (United States) A Lawson	2	3
(Colombia) N Mejía (Colombia) A Urrea	7^{7}	6^{5}	[7]
(Chinese Taipei) J Jung (Japan) R Noguchi	6^{1}	7^{7}	[10]
4	(Austria) M Neuchrist (Greece) M Pervolarakis	3	7	[10]
WC	(Mexico) R Pacheco Méndez (Paraguay) AD Vallejo	6	5	[5]
WC	(Mexico) Daniel Moreno (Mexico) M Sánchez	5	6	[4]
(Zimbabwe) B Lock (New Zealand) R Statham	7	3	[10]
(Argentina) R Olivo (Argentina) TA Tirante	6^{3}	6^{9}
(Northern Mariana Islands) C Sinclair (Australia) A Walton	7^{7}	7^{11}
(Argentina) RA Burruchaga (Brazil) JL Reis da Silva	5	5
3	(France) T Arribagé (France) L Sanchez	7	7
(New Zealand) A Rai (Australia) L Saville	6	3	[10]
(Argentina) JP Ficovich (Argentina) F Mena	3	6	[8]
Alt	(Argentina) V Aboian (Bolivia) M Dellien	7^{7}	1	[14]
2	(Bolivia) B Arias (Bolivia) F Zeballos	6^{4}	6	[12]

Quarterfinals
1	(Philippines) R Gonzales (United States) E King	6	7^{7}
(Chinese Taipei) J Jung (Japan) R Noguchi	4	6^{5}
4	(Austria) M Neuchrist (Greece) M Pervolarakis	7^{9}	0	[10]
(Zimbabwe) B Lock (New Zealand) R Statham	6^{7}	6	[12]
(Northern Mariana Islands) C Sinclair (Australia) A Walton	6	6
3	(France) T Arribagé (France) L Sanchez	3	4
(New Zealand) A Rai (Australia) L Saville	2	4
Alt	(Argentina) V Aboian (Bolivia) M Dellien	6	6

Semifinals
1	(Philippines) R Gonzales (United States) E King	7^{7}	6^{9}	[12]
(Zimbabwe) B Lock (New Zealand) R Statham	6^{5}	7^{11}	[14]
(Northern Mariana Islands) C Sinclair (Australia) A Walton	7	2	[12]
Alt	(Argentina) V Aboian (Bolivia) M Dellien	5	6	[10]

Final
(Zimbabwe) B Lock (New Zealand) R Statham	7	3	[5]
(Northern Mariana Islands) C Sinclair (Australia) A Walton	5	6	[10]
