= 2023 Zavarovalnica Sava Ljubljana – Singles =

Singles
- 2023 Zavarovalnica Sava Ljubljana

Final
- Champion: (Spain) Marina Bassols Ribera
- Runner-up: (Turkey) Zeynep Sönmez
- Score: 6–0, 7–6^{(7–2)}

Details
- Draw: 32 (4 WC)
- Seeds: 8

Events
Singles	Doubles
← 2022 ·	BMW Ljubljana Open	· 2024 →

Marina Bassols Ribera won the title, defeating Zeynep Sönmez in the final, 6–0, 7–6^{(7–2)}.

Kateřina Siniaková was the reigning champion from 2022, when the tournament was a WTA 250 event, but she chose not to compete.

== Seeds ==
1. (Slovakia) Anna Karolína Schmiedlová (second round)
2. (Spain) Aliona Bolsova (second round)
3. (Hungary) Dalma Gálfi (quarterfinals)
4. (Slovenia) Tamara Zidanšek (semifinals)
5. (Spain) Marina Bassols Ribera (champion)
6. (Slovenia) Kaja Juvan (second round)
7. (Cyprus) Raluca Șerban (first round)
8. Erika Andreeva (quarterfinals)

== Draw ==
=== Key ===
- Q = Qualifier
- WC = Wild card
- LL = Lucky loser
- Alt = Alternate
- SE = Special exempt
- PR = Protected ranking
- ITF = ITF entry
- JE = Junior exempt
- w/o = Walkover
- r = Retired
- d = Defaulted
- SR = Special ranking

=== Finals ===
Semifinals
(Turkey) Zeynep Sönmez	6	6
4	(Slovenia) Tamara Zidanšek	2	3
(Romania) Miriam Bulgaru	5	5
5	(Spain) Marina Bassols Ribera	7	7

Final
(Turkey) Zeynep Sönmez	0	6^{2}
5	(Spain) Marina Bassols Ribera	6	7^{7}

=== Top half ===
First round
1	(Slovakia) AK Schmiedlová	6	6
(Uzbekistan) N Abduraimova	3	2
(Poland) K Kawa	6	4	6
(Slovenia) D Jakupović	4	6	4
Q	(Ukraine) O Oliynykova	3	4
(Turkey) Z Sönmez	6	6
(Croatia) A Ružić	6	6
7	(Cyprus) R Șerban	2	0
4	(Slovenia) T Zidanšek	6	6
Q	(Czech Republic) M Bayerlová	0	1
WC	(Slovenia) P Lovrič	6	6
WC	(Hungary) N Szabanin	4	2
A Anshba	3	1
(Czech Republic) S Bejlek	6	6
LL	(Venezuela) A Gámiz	6	4	3
8	E Andreeva	3	6	6

Second round
1	(Slovakia) AK Schmiedlová	5	2
(Poland) K Kawa	7	6
(Turkey) Z Sönmez	3	6	6
(Croatia) A Ružić	6	3	2
4	(Slovenia) T Zidanšek	6	6
WC	(Slovenia) P Lovrič	0	0
(Czech Republic) S Bejlek	4	4
8	E Andreeva	6	6

Quarterfinals
(Poland) K Kawa	1	4
(Turkey) Z Sönmez	6	6
4	(Slovenia) T Zidanšek	6	5	6
8	E Andreeva	4	7	2

Semifinals
(Turkey) Z Sönmez	6	6
4	(Slovenia) T Zidanšek	2	3

=== Bottom half ===
First round
6	(Slovenia) K Juvan	3
Q	(Czech Republic) G Knutson	0^{r}
Q	(United States) A Lahey	6	3	4
(Romania) M Bulgaru	3	6	6
WC	(Slovenia) Ž Falkner	6	2	2
LL	(Hungary) RL Jani	4	6	6
WC	(Slovenia) E Milić	1	6	1
3	(Hungary) D Gálfi	6	4	6
5	(Spain) M Bassols Ribera	1	6	7^{7}
(Serbia) L Radivojević	6	1	6^{5}
(Greece) S Sakellaridi	6	6
(Poland) W Falkowska	1	2
(Croatia) L Ćirić Bagarić	7^{7}	6
(Austria) S Kraus	6^{4}	3
(Slovenia) N Potočnik	2	3
2	(Spain) A Bolsova	6	6

Second round
6	(Slovenia) K Juvan	4	3
(Romania) M Bulgaru	6	6
LL	(Hungary) RL Jani	1	6^{3}
3	(Hungary) D Gálfi	6	7^{7}
5	(Spain) M Bassols Ribera	6	6
(Greece) S Sakellaridi	4	3
(Croatia) L Ćirić Bagarić	4	6	6
2	(Spain) A Bolsova	6	3	0

Quarterfinals
(Romania) M Bulgaru	6	6
3	(Hungary) D Gálfi	2	3
5	(Spain) M Bassols Ribera	6	6
(Croatia) L Ćirić Bagarić	2	2

Semifinals
(Romania) M Bulgaru	5	5
5	(Spain) M Bassols Ribera	7	7

== Qualifying ==
=== Seeds ===
1. (Hungary) Réka Luca Jani (qualifying competition, lucky loser)
2. (Czech Republic) Gabriela Knutson (qualified)
3. (United States) Ashley Lahey (qualified)
4. (Czech Republic) Michaela Bayerlová (qualified)

=== Qualifiers ===
1. (Ukraine) Oleksandra Oliynykova
2. (Czech Republic) Gabriela Knutson
3. (United States) Ashley Lahey
4. (Czech Republic) Michaela Bayerlová

=== Lucky losers ===
1. (Hungary) Réka Luca Jani
2. (Venezuela) Andrea Gámiz

=== Draw ===
==== First qualifier ====
Qualifying competition
1	(Hungary) Réka Luca Jani	5	3
	(Ukraine) Oleksandra Oliynykova	7	6

==== Second qualifier ====
Qualifying competition
2	(Czech Republic) Gabriela Knutson	6	6
	(Venezuela) Andrea Gámiz	4	2

==== Third qualifier ====
Qualifying competition
3	(United States) Ashley Lahey	6	6
WC	(Slovenia) Ela Plošnik	2	2

==== Fourth qualifier ====
Qualifying competition
4	(Czech Republic) Michaela Bayerlová	6	6
WC	(Slovenia) Zoja Peternel	3	1
