= 2023 BBVA Open Internacional de Valencia – Singles =

Singles
- 2023 BBVA Open Internacional de Valencia

Final
- Champion: (Egypt) Mayar Sherif
- Runner-up: (Spain) Marina Bassols Ribera
- Score: 6–3, 6–3

Details
- Draw: 32 (5 WC)
- Seeds: 8

Events
Singles	Doubles
- Open Internacional de Valencia

Mayar Sherif won the title, defeating Marina Bassols Ribera 6–3, 6–3 in the final.

Zheng Qinwen was the reigning champion, but chose not to defend her title.

== Seeds ==
1. (Egypt) Mayar Sherif (champion)
2. (Austria) Julia Grabher (first round, retired)
3. (Italy) Sara Errani (quarterfinals)
4. (United States) Emma Navarro (withdrew)
5. (Ukraine) Kateryna Baindl (withdrew)
6. (Hungary) Panna Udvardy (second round)
7. (United States) Caroline Dolehide (second round)
8. (Argentina) Nadia Podoroska (semifinals)
9. (Hungary) Anna Bondár (first round)

== Draw ==
Key

- Q = Qualifier
- WC = Wild card
- LL = Lucky loser
- Alt = Alternate
- ITF = ITF entry
- PR = Protected ranking
- SR = Special ranking
- SE = Special exempt
- JE = Junior exempt
- JR = Junior Accelerator Programme entrant
- CO = College Accelerator Programme entrant
- NG = Next Gen Accelerator Program entrant
- w/o = Walkover
- r = Retired
- d = Defaulted

=== Finals ===
Semifinals
1/WC	(Egypt) Mayar Sherif	6	6
8	(Argentina) Nadia Podoroska	1	3
(Spain) Marina Bassols Ribera	3	6	6
(Germany) Tamara Korpatsch	6	3	1

Final
1/WC	(Egypt) Mayar Sherif	6	6
(Spain) Marina Bassols Ribera	3	3

=== Top half ===
First round
1/WC	(Egypt) M Sherif	6	6
LL	(Chile) D Seguel	0	1
(Austria) S Kraus	4	2
SE	(Argentina) ML Carlé	6	6
Q	(Croatia) L Bošković	3	7^{7}	3
Q	(United States) A Li	6	6^{1}	6
(Spain) A Bolsova	3	2
6	(Hungary) P Udvardy	6	6
9	(Hungary) A Bondár	3	7^{7}	3
(Sweden) M Björklund	6	6^{3}	6
LL	D Astakhova	7^{9}	5	6
(Slovenia) K Juvan	6^{7}	7	3
(France) L Jeanjean	7	6
WC	(Spain) R Vicens Mas	5	4
WC	(Spain) Á Fita Boluda	2	6	5
8	(Argentina) N Podoroska	6	4	7

Second round
1/WC	(Egypt) M Sherif	6	6
SE	(Argentina) ML Carlé	2	1
Q	(United States) A Li	6	6
6	(Hungary) P Udvardy	3	2
(Sweden) M Björklund	6	6
LL	D Astakhova	4	3
(France) L Jeanjean
8	(Argentina) N Podoroska	w/o

Quarterfinals
1/WC	(Egypt) M Sherif	6	6
Q	(United States) A Li	1	2
(Sweden) M Björklund	7^{7}	3	4
8	(Argentina) N Podoroska	6^{5}	6	6

Semifinals
1/WC	(Egypt) M Sherif	6	6
8	(Argentina) N Podoroska	1	3

=== Bottom half ===
First round
LL	A Fomina-Klotz	3	5
LL	(Spain) G Maristany	6	7
(Spain) M Bassols Ribera	6	6
WC	(Spain) C Esquiva Bañuls	2	2
(Spain) S Sorribes Tormo	6	6
(Spain) L Romero Gormaz	0	3
Q	(Latvia) D Semeņistaja	4	0
3	(Italy) S Errani	6	6
7	(United States) C Dolehide	6	6
Q	(France) E Jacquemot	2	2
(Germany) T Korpatsch	6	6
(Switzerland) Y In-Albon	1	2
(Romania) J Cristian	4	5
(Denmark) C Tauson	6	7
WC	(Spain) J Bouzas Maneiro	6	2
2	(Austria) J Grabher	3	1^{r}

Second round
LL	(Spain) G Maristany	4	4
(Spain) M Bassols Ribera	6	6
(Spain) S Sorribes Tormo	1	6	4
3	(Italy) S Errani	6	1	6
7	(United States) C Dolehide	1	3
(Germany) T Korpatsch	6	6
(Denmark) C Tauson	7^{7}	1	4
WC	(Spain) J Bouzas Maneiro	6^{4}	6	6

Quarterfinals
(Spain) M Bassols Ribera	7^{9}	6
3	(Italy) S Errani	6^{7}	4
(Germany) T Korpatsch	6	6
WC	(Spain) J Bouzas Maneiro	1	3

Semifinals
(Spain) M Bassols Ribera	3	6	6
(Germany) T Korpatsch	6	3	1

== Qualifying ==
=== Seeds ===
1. (France) Elsa Jacquemot (qualified)
2. (United States) Ann Li (qualified)
3. (France) Carole Monnet (qualifying competition)
4. (Latvia) Darja Semeņistaja (qualified)
5. Darya Astakhova (qualifying competition, lucky loser)
6. (Germany) Mona Barthel (qualifying competition, retired)
7. (Spain) Rosa Vicens Mas (moved to main draw)
8. (Croatia) Lea Bošković (qualified)

=== Qualifiers ===
1. (France) Elsa Jacquemot
2. (United States) Ann Li
3. (Croatia) Lea Bošković
4. (Latvia) Darja Semeņistaja

=== Lucky losers ===
1. Darya Astakhova
2. (Chile) Daniela Seguel
3. (Spain) Guiomar Maristany
4. Alena Fomina-Klotz

=== Draw ===
==== First qualifier ====
First round
1	(France) Elsa Jacquemot	6	6
(Venezuela) Andrea Gamiz	3	3
WC	Maria Andrienko	3	0
5	Darya Astakhova	6	6

Qualifying competition
1	(France) Elsa Jacquemot	6	7
5	Darya Astakhova	0	5

==== Second qualifier ====
First round				Qualifying competition
2	(United States) Ann Li	7	6
	(Spain) Guiomar Maristany	5	3
	(Spain) Guiomar Maristany	5	3	2	(United States) Ann Li	6	6
					(Chile) Daniela Seguel	3	3

==== Third qualifier ====
First round
3	(France) Carole Monnet	6	6
WC	(Malta) Helene Pellicano	1	1
(Spain) Lucía Cortez Llorca	3	1
8	(Croatia) Lea Bošković	6	6

Qualifying competition
3	(France) Carole Monnet	4	2
8	(Croatia) Lea Bošković	6	6

==== Fourth qualifier ====
First round
4	(Latvia) Darja Semeņistaja	6	6
(Bulgaria) Sesil Karatantcheva	1	0
Alena Fomina-Klotz	3	1
6	(Germany) Mona Barthel	6	6

Qualifying competition
4	(Latvia) Darja Semeņistaja	6	3
6	(Germany) Mona Barthel	1	1^{r}
