= 2023 Zavarovalnica Sava Ljubljana – Doubles =

Doubles
- 2023 Zavarovalnica Sava Ljubljana

Final
- Champions: Amina Anshba (United States) Quinn Gleason
- Runners-up: (United Kingdom) Freya Christie (Colombia) Yuliana Lizarazo
- Score: 6–3, 6–4

Events
Singles	Doubles
← 2022 ·	BMW Ljubljana Open	· 2024 →

Marta Kostyuk and Tereza Martincová were the reigning champions, but chose not to compete.

Amina Anshba and Quinn Gleason won the title, defeating Freya Christie and Yuliana Lizarazo in the final, 6–3, 6–4.

== Seeds ==
1. (Spain) Aliona Bolsova / (Venezuela) Andrea Gámiz (first round)
2. (Poland) Weronika Falkowska / (Poland) Katarzyna Kawa (first round)
3. Amina Anshba / (United States) Quinn Gleason (champions)
4. (United Kingdom) Freya Christie / (Colombia) Yuliana Lizarazo (final)

== Draw ==
=== Key ===
- Q = Qualifier
- WC = Wild card
- LL = Lucky loser
- Alt = Alternate
- SE = Special exempt
- PR = Protected ranking
- ITF = ITF entry
- JE = Junior exempt
- w/o = Walkover
- r = Retired
- d = Defaulted
- SR = Special ranking

=== Draw ===
First round
1	(Spain) A Bolsova (Venezuela) A Gámiz	6	4	[10]
(Uzbekistan) N Abduraimova (France) E Cascino	3	6	[12]
Alt	(Czech Republic) D Hindová (Czech Republic) K Kubáňová	7	6
(United States) A Lahey (Australia) A Osborne	5	3
4	(United Kingdom) F Christie (Colombia) Y Lizarazo	6	4	[10]
(Spain) M Bassols Ribera (Slovenia) K Juvan	4	6	[5]
(Slovenia) V Erjavec (Slovenia) D Jakupović	6	5	[4]
E Andreeva (Czech Republic) S Bejlek	1	7	[10]
(Czech Republic) G Knutson (Czech Republic) R Voráčová	5	6^{4}
(Czech Republic) M Bayerlová (United Kingdom) E Webley-Smith	7	7^{7}
WC	(Slovenia) E Milić (Slovenia) N Potočnik	4	4
3	A Anshba (United States) Q Gleason	6	6
(Slovenia) N Radišić (Bosnia and Herzegovina) A Wagner	6	3	[12]
A Fomina-Klotz (Germany) J Lohoff	4	6	[14]
(United States) C Rosca (Greece) S Sakellaridi	7^{7}	6
2	(Poland) W Falkowska (Poland) K Kawa	6^{1}	4

Quarterfinals
(Uzbekistan) N Abduraimova (France) E Cascino	4	7	[10]
Alt	(Czech Republic) D Hindová (Czech Republic) K Kubáňová	6	5	[6]
4	(United Kingdom) F Christie (Colombia) Y Lizarazo	0	7	[10]
E Andreeva (Czech Republic) S Bejlek	6	5	[6]
(Czech Republic) M Bayerlová (United Kingdom) E Webley-Smith	1	5
3	A Anshba (United States) Q Gleason	6	7
A Fomina-Klotz (Germany) J Lohoff	4	2
(United States) C Rosca (Greece) S Sakellaridi	6	6

Semifinals
(Uzbekistan) N Abduraimova (France) E Cascino	2	6	[7]
4	(United Kingdom) F Christie (Colombia) Y Lizarazo	6	4	[10]
3	A Anshba (United States) Q Gleason	7	4	[10]
(United States) C Rosca (Greece) S Sakellaridi	5	6	[7]

Final
4	(United Kingdom) F Christie (Colombia) Y Lizarazo	3	4
3	A Anshba (United States) Q Gleason	6	6
