= 2023 Catalonia Open – Doubles =

Doubles
- 2023 Catalonia Open

Final
- Champions: (Australia) Storm Hunter (Australia) Ellen Perez
- Runners-up: (Chile) Alexa Guarachi (New Zealand) Erin Routliffe
- Score: 6–1, 7–6^{(10–8)}

Details
- Draw: 12
- Seeds: 4

Events
| Singles | Doubles |
- Catalonia Open

This was the first edition of the tournament.

Storm Hunter and Ellen Perez won the title, defeating Alexa Guarachi and Erin Routliffe in the final, 6–1, 7–6^{(10–8)}.

== Seeds ==
All seeds received a bye into the second round.

1. (Australia) Storm Hunter / (Australia) Ellen Perez (champions)
2. (Chile) Alexa Guarachi / (New Zealand) Erin Routliffe (final)
3. (Japan) Miyu Kato / Yana Sizikova (quarterfinals)
4. (Spain) Aliona Bolsova / (Kazakhstan) Anna Danilina (quarterfinals)

== Draw ==
Key

- Q = Qualifier
- WC = Wild card
- LL = Lucky loser
- Alt = Alternate
- ITF = ITF entry
- PR = Protected ranking
- SR = Special ranking
- SE = Special exempt
- JE = Junior exempt
- JR = Junior Accelerator Programme entrant
- CO = College Accelerator Programme entrant
- NG = Next Gen Accelerator Program entrant
- w/o = Walkover
- r = Retired
- d = Defaulted

=== Draw ===
First round
(Colombia) E Arango (United States) E Mandlik | w/o
(Czech Republic) M Bouzková (Spain) S Sorribes Tormo
K Rakhimova; V Zvonareva | 6 | 3 | [4]
(Czech Republic) M Kolodziejová (Poland) K Piter | 3 | 6 | [10]
(Spain) Á Fita Boluda (Netherlands) A Rus | 6 | 6
(Hungary) D Gálfi (Slovakia) T Mihalíková | 3 | 4
(Spain) M Bassols Ribera (Spain) L Romero Gormaz | 7 | 2 | [10]
(France) E Cascino (Japan) M Uchijima | 5 | 6 | [4]

Quarterfinals
1 | (Australia) S Hunter (Australia) E Perez | 6 | 6
(Colombia) E Arango (United States) E Mandlik | 1 | 4
3 | (Japan) M Kato; Y Sizikova | 6 | 3 | [6]
(Czech Republic) M Kolodziejová (Poland) K Piter | 3 | 6 | [10]
(Spain) Á Fita Boluda (Netherlands) A Rus | 6 | 2 | [10]
4 | (Spain) A Bolsova (Kazakhstan) A Danilina | 3 | 6 | [8]
(Spain) M Bassols Ribera (Spain) L Romero Gormaz | 5 | 7^{7} | [7]
2 | (Chile) A Guarachi (New Zealand) E Routliffe | 7 | 6^{5} | [10]

Semifinals
1 | (Australia) S Hunter (Australia) E Perez | 6 | 4 | [10]
(Czech Republic) M Kolodziejová (Poland) K Piter | 4 | 6 | [8]
(Spain) Á Fita Boluda (Netherlands) A Rus | 3 | 6 | [6]
2 | (Chile) A Guarachi (New Zealand) E Routliffe | 6 | 4 | [10]

Final
1 | (Australia) S Hunter (Australia) E Perez | 6 | 7^{10}
2 | (Chile) A Guarachi (New Zealand) E Routliffe | 1 | 6^{8}
