= 2023 Catalonia Open – Singles =

Singles
- 2023 Catalonia Open

Final
- Champion: (Romania) Sorana Cîrstea
- Runner-up: (United States) Elizabeth Mandlik
- Score: 6–1, 4–6, 7–6^{(7–1)}

Details
- Draw: 32 (6 WC)
- Seeds: 8

Events
Singles	Doubles
- Catalonia Open

This was the first edition of the tournament.

Sorana Cîrstea defeated Elizabeth Mandlik in the final, 6–1, 4–6, 7–6^{(7–1)}, saving a championship point en route to the title.

== Seeds ==
1. (Switzerland) Jil Teichmann (quarterfinals)
2. (Romania) Sorana Cîrstea (champion)
3. (United States) Lauren Davis (semifinals)
4. (China) Wang Xinyu (first round)
5. Anna Blinkova (second round)
6. (Italy) Jasmine Paolini (second round)
7. (United States) Caty McNally (quarterfinals)
8. (France) Alizé Cornet (first round)

== Draw ==
Key

- Q = Qualifier
- WC = Wild card
- LL = Lucky loser
- Alt = Alternate
- ITF = ITF entry
- PR = Protected ranking
- SR = Special ranking
- SE = Special exempt
- JE = Junior exempt
- JR = Junior Accelerator Programme entrant
- CO = College Accelerator Programme entrant
- NG = Next Gen Accelerator Program entrant
- w/o = Walkover
- r = Retired
- d = Defaulted

=== Finals ===
Semifinals
(Ukraine) Dayana Yastremska	5	6	4
Q	(United States) Elizabeth Mandlik	7	4	6
3	(United States) Lauren Davis	4	5
2/WC	(Romania) Sorana Cîrstea	6	7

Final
Q	(United States) Elizabeth Mandlik	1	6	6^{1}
2/WC	(Romania) Sorana Cîrstea	6	4	7^{7}

=== Top half ===
First round
1/WC	(Switzerland) J Teichmann	6	6
(Switzerland) Y In-Albon	1	3
Q	(Colombia) E Arango	6	6
Q	E Andreeva	4	4
(Spain) S Sorribes Tormo	6^{5}	3
(Ukraine) D Yastremska	7^{7}	6
K Rakhimova	2	6	4
5	A Blinkova	6	1	6
4	(China) Xin Wang	0	6^{3}
(Spain) N Párrizas Díaz	6	7^{7}
(Hungary) D Gálfi	6	4	4
(Netherlands) A Rus	1	6	6
Q	(Spain) Á Fita Boluda	1	5
Q	(United States) E Mandlik	6	7
WC	(Spain) C Martínez Círez	2	1
6	(Italy) J Paolini	6	6

Second round
1/WC	(Switzerland) J Teichmann	6	6
Q	(Colombia) E Arango	3	4
(Ukraine) D Yastremska	6	7
5	A Blinkova	4	5
(Spain) N Párrizas Díaz	6	6
(Netherlands) A Rus	2	3
Q	(United States) E Mandlik	4	7	6
6	(Italy) J Paolini	6	5	2

Quarterfinals
1/WC	(Switzerland) J Teichmann	5	6^{1}
(Ukraine) D Yastremska	7	7^{7}
(Spain) N Párrizas Díaz	4	6	1
Q	(United States) E Mandlik	6	2	6

Semifinals
(Ukraine) D Yastremska	5	6	4
Q	(United States) E Mandlik	7	4	6

=== Bottom half ===
First round
8	(France) A Cornet	0	2
WC	(Spain) L Romero Gormaz	6	6
(Colombia) C Osorio	6	6
(Japan) M Uchijima	2	4
(Denmark) C Tauson	6	6^{4}	4
(Bulgaria) V Tomova	4	7^{7}	6
(Austria) J Grabher	2	6^{4}
3	(United States) L Davis	6	7^{7}
7	(United States) C McNally	6	6
WC	(Spain) I Burillo Escorihuela	4	3
(Spain) M Bassols Ribera	4	2
(Argentina) N Podoroska	6	6
(Slovakia) AK Schmiedlová	6	2	7^{7}
(Sweden) M Björklund	4	6	6^{1}
WC	(Spain) A Bolsova	5	0
2/WC	(Romania) S Cîrstea	7	6

Second round
WC	(Spain) L Romero Gormaz	0	2
(Colombia) C Osorio	6	6
(Bulgaria) V Tomova	2	6	5
3	(United States) L Davis	6	2	7
7	(United States) C McNally	1	6	6
(Argentina) N Podoroska	6	4	1
(Slovakia) AK Schmiedlová	5	4
2/WC	(Romania) S Cîrstea	7	6

Quarterfinals
(Colombia) C Osorio	4	3
3	(United States) L Davis	6	6
7	(United States) C McNally	2	2
2/WC	(Romania) S Cîrstea	6	6

Semifinals
3	(United States) L Davis	4	5
2/WC	(Romania) S Cîrstea	6	7

== Qualifying ==
=== Seeds ===
1. Erika Andreeva (qualified)
2. (United States) Elizabeth Mandlik (qualified)
3. (Colombia) Emiliana Arango (qualified)
4. (Spain) Ángela Fita Boluda (qualified)

=== Qualifiers ===
1. Erika Andreeva
2. (United States) Elizabeth Mandlik
3. (Colombia) Emiliana Arango
4. (Spain) Ángela Fita Boluda

=== Draw ===
==== First qualifier ====
Qualifying competition
1	Erika Andreeva	6	6
	(Kazakhstan) Anna Danilina	1	4

==== Second qualifier ====
Qualifying competition
2	(United States) Elizabeth Mandlik	6	6
	(Australia) Ellen Perez	3	1

==== Third qualifier ====
Qualifying competition
3	(Colombia) Emiliana Arango	6	6
	Vera Zvonareva	3	1

==== Fourth qualifier ====
Qualifying competition
4	(Spain) Ángela Fita Boluda	6	6
	(Spain) Judith Hernández Miranda	1	1
