= 2023 MundoTenis Open – Doubles =

Doubles
- 2023 MundoTenis Open

Final
- Champions: (Italy) Sara Errani (France) Léolia Jeanjean
- Runners-up: (Germany) Julia Lohoff (Switzerland) Conny Perrin
- Score: 7–5, 3–6, [10–7]

Details
- Draw: 16
- Seeds: 4

Events
Singles	Doubles
- MundoTenis Open

Sara Errani and Léolia Jeanjean won the doubles title at the 2023 MundoTenis Open, defeating Julia Lohoff and Conny Perrin in the final, 7–5, 3–6, [10–7].

Lyudmyla and Nadiia Kichenok were the reigning champions from 2016, when the event was a WTA International tournament, but did not participate this year.

== Seeds ==
1. Amina Anshba / (United States) Quinn Gleason (quarterfinals)
2. (United States) Makenna Jones / (United States) Angela Kulikov (first round, withdrew)
3. (United Kingdom) Freya Christie / (Colombia) Yuliana Lizarazo (first round)
4. (Colombia) María Paulina Pérez García / (United States) Sofia Sewing (semifinals)

== Draw ==
Key

- Q = Qualifier
- WC = Wild card
- LL = Lucky loser
- Alt = Alternate
- ITF = ITF entry
- PR = Protected ranking
- SR = Special ranking
- SE = Special exempt
- JE = Junior exempt
- JR = Junior Accelerator Programme entrant
- CO = College Accelerator Programme entrant
- NG = Next Gen Accelerator Program entrant
- w/o = Walkover
- r = Retired
- d = Defaulted

=== Draw ===
First round
1	A Anshba (United States) Q Gleason	6	6
(Argentina) ML Carlé (Greece) D Papamichail	2	0
(Brazil) I Gamarra Martins (Brazil) L Pigossi	6^{7}	6	[7]
(Germany) J Lohoff (Switzerland) C Perrin	7^{9}	4	[10]
4	(Colombia) MP Pérez García (United States) S Sewing	w/o
(Croatia) P Marčinko (France) C Monnet
(Brazil) G Cé (Brazil) R Pereira	5	6	[10]
(Venezuela) A Gámiz (Netherlands) E Vedder	7	2	[7]
(Argentina) M Capurro Taborda (Argentina) J Riera	6	7^{7}
(France) E Lechemia (Mexico) R Zarazúa	3	6^{4}
(United States) A Rogers; D Shnaider	2	6	[10]
3	(United Kingdom) F Christie (Colombia) Y Lizarazo	6	3	[3]
(Brazil) C Alves (Argentina) S Sierra	2	5
(Georgia (country)) E Gorgodze (United States) J Loeb	6	7
(Italy) S Errani (France) L Jeanjean	w/o
2	(United States) M Jones (United States) A Kulikov

Quarterfinals
1	A Anshba (United States) Q Gleason	4	5
(Germany) J Lohoff (Switzerland) C Perrin	6	7
4	(Colombia) MP Pérez García (United States) S Sewing	4	7	[12]
(Brazil) G Cé (Brazil) R Pereira	6	5	[10]
(Argentina) M Capurro Taborda (Argentina) J Riera	1	5
(United States) A Rogers; D Shnaider	6	7
(Georgia (country)) E Gorgodze (United States) J Loeb	6	2	[6]
(Italy) S Errani (France) L Jeanjean	2	6	[10]

Semifinals
(Germany) J Lohoff (Switzerland) C Perrin	6	4	[10]
4	(Colombia) MP Pérez García (United States) S Sewing	3	6	[5]
(United States) A Rogers; D Shnaider	3	0
(Italy) S Errani (France) L Jeanjean	6	6

Final
(Germany) J Lohoff (Switzerland) C Perrin	5	6	[7]
(Italy) S Errani (France) L Jeanjean	7	3	[10]
