= 2023 Torneig Internacional de Tennis Femení Solgironès – Doubles =

Doubles
- 2023 Torneig Internacional de Tennis Femení Solgironès

Final
- Champions: (United States) Caroline Dolehide; Diana Shnaider
- Runners-up: (Spain) Aliona Bolsova (Spain) Rebeka Masarova
- Score: 7–6^{(7–5)}, 6–3

Events
Singles	Doubles
← 2022 ·	Torneig Internacional de Tennis Femení Solgironès	· 2024 →

Victoria Jiménez Kasintseva and Renata Zarazúa were the reigning champions, but Jiménez Kasintseva chose not to participate. Zarazúa partnered with Andreea Prisăcariu but lost in the first round to Yuliana Lizarazo and María Paulina Pérez García.

Caroline Dolehide and Diana Shnaider won the title, defeating Aliona Bolsova and Rebeka Masarova in the final, 7–6^{(7–5)}, 6–3.

== Seeds ==
1. (Czech Republic) Anastasia Dețiuc / (Venezuela) Andrea Gámiz (quarterfinals)
2. (Georgia (country)) Ekaterine Gorgodze / (Georgia (country)) Oksana Kalashnikova (quarterfinals)

== Draw ==
=== Key ===
- Q = Qualifier
- WC = Wild card
- LL = Lucky loser
- Alt = Alternate
- SE = Special exempt
- PR = Protected ranking
- ITF = ITF entry
- JE = Junior exempt
- w/o = Walkover
- r = Retired
- d = Defaulted
- SR = Special ranking

=== Draw ===
Quarterfinals
1	(Czech Republic) A Dețiuc (Venezuela) A Gámiz	1	2
(Spain) A Bolsova (Spain) R Masarova	6	6
WC	(Romania) A Prisăcariu (Mexico) R Zarazúa	6^{4}	4
(Colombia) Y Lizarazo (Colombia) MP Pérez García	7^{7}	6
(Poland) K Piter (Argentina) N Podoroska	4	1
I Khromacheva (Netherlands) B Schoofs	6	6
(United States) C Dolehide; D Shnaider	7	6
2	(Georgia (country)) E Gorgodze (Georgia (country)) O Kalashnikova	5	3

Semifinals
(Spain) A Bolsova (Spain) R Masarova	7	7^{7}
(Colombia) Y Lizarazo (Colombia) MP Pérez García	5	6^{4}
I Khromacheva (Netherlands) B Schoofs	0	3
(United States) C Dolehide; D Shnaider	6	6

Final
(Spain) A Bolsova (Spain) R Masarova	6^{5}	3
(United States) C Dolehide; D Shnaider	7^{7}	6
