= 2023 BBVA Open Internacional de Valencia – Doubles =

Doubles
- 2023 BBVA Open Internacional de Valencia

Final
- Champions: (Spain) Aliona Bolsova (Venezuela) Andrea Gámiz
- Runners-up: Angelina Gabueva; Irina Khromacheva
- Score: 6–4, 4–6, [10–7]

Events
Singles	Doubles
- Open Internacional de Valencia

Aliona Bolsova and Rebeka Masarova were the defending champions, but Masarova chose not to participate. Bolsova partnered Andrea Gámiz and successfully defended the title, defeating Angelina Gabueva and Irina Khromacheva in the final, 6–4, 4–6, [10–7].

== Seeds ==
1. (Spain) Aliona Bolsova / (Venezuela) Andrea Gámiz (champions)
2. Angelina Gabueva / Irina Khromacheva (final)

== Draw ==
Key

- Q = Qualifier
- WC = Wild card
- LL = Lucky loser
- Alt = Alternate
- ITF = ITF entry
- PR = Protected ranking
- SR = Special ranking
- SE = Special exempt
- JE = Junior exempt
- JR = Junior Accelerator Programme entrant
- CO = College Accelerator Programme entrant
- NG = Next Gen Accelerator Program entrant
- w/o = Walkover
- r = Retired
- d = Defaulted

=== Draw ===
Quarterfinals
(Romania) J Cristian (Switzerland) Y In-Albon
(Spain) J Bouzas Maneiro (Spain) G Maristany	w/o
(Colombia) Y Lizarazo (Colombia) MP Pérez García	0	2
A Fomina-Klotz (Australia) O Tjandramulia	6	6
WC	(Spain) C Esquiva Bañuls (Spain) Á Fita Boluda	6^{4}	6^{3}
2	A Gabueva; I Khromacheva	7^{7}	7^{7}

Semifinals
1	(Spain) A Bolsova (Venezuela) A Gámiz	7^{7}	6
(Spain) J Bouzas Maneiro (Spain) G Maristany	6^{3}	1
A Fomina-Klotz (Australia) O Tjandramulia	1	2
2	A Gabueva; I Khromacheva	6	6

Final
1	(Spain) A Bolsova (Venezuela) A Gámiz	6	4	[10]
2	A Gabueva; I Khromacheva	4	6	[7]
