= 2023 MundoTenis Open – Singles =

Singles
- 2023 MundoTenis Open

Final
- Champion: (Australia) Ajla Tomljanović
- Runner-up: (Argentina) Martina Capurro Taborda
- Score: 6–1, 7–5

Details
- Draw: 32
- Seeds: 8

Events
Singles	Doubles
- MundoTenis Open

Ajla Tomljanović won the singles title at the 2023 MundoTenis Open, defeating Martina Capurro Taborda in the final, 6–1, 7–5. She saved four match points in her second-round match against İpek Öz en route to her maiden WTA 125 title.

Irina-Camelia Begu was the reigning champion from 2016, when the event was a WTA International tournament, but withdrew before the tournament began.

== Seeds ==
1. (United States) Emma Navarro (first round)
2. Diana Shnaider (second round)
3. (Argentina) Nadia Podoroska (semifinals)
4. (Italy) Sara Errani (first round)
5. (France) Diane Parry (first round)
6. (Hungary) Anna Bondár (first round)
7. (Hungary) Panna Udvardy (first round)
8. (United States) Elizabeth Mandlik (second round)

== Draw ==
Key

- Q = Qualifier
- WC = Wild card
- LL = Lucky loser
- Alt = Alternate
- ITF = ITF entry
- PR = Protected ranking
- SR = Special ranking
- SE = Special exempt
- JE = Junior exempt
- JR = Junior Accelerator Programme entrant
- CO = College Accelerator Programme entrant
- NG = Next Gen Accelerator Program entrant
- w/o = Walkover
- r = Retired
- d = Defaulted

=== Finals ===
Semifinals
WC	(Australia) Ajla Tomljanović	6	6
(Mexico) Renata Zarazúa	1	1
3	(Argentina) Nadia Podoroska	2	1
(Argentina) Martina Capurro Taborda	6	6

Final
WC	(Australia) Ajla Tomljanović	6	7
(Argentina) Martina Capurro Taborda	1	5

=== Top half ===
First round
1/WC	(United States) E Navarro	4	6^{2}
(Argentina) S Sierra	6	7^{7}
(Romania) M Bulgaru	6^{4}	7^{7}	6
(Brazil) L Pigossi	7^{7}	6^{4}	0
WC	(Australia) A Tomljanović	6^{5}	7	6
(France) F Ferro	7^{7}	5	3
(Turkey) İ Öz	7	6
6	(Hungary) A Bondár	5	0
4	(Italy) S Errani	1	6^{5}
(Czech Republic) S Bejlek	6	7^{7}
(France) L Jeanjean	0
(Croatia) P Marčinko	2^{r}
(Argentina) J Riera	4	6^{2}
(Greece) D Papamichail	6	7^{7}
(Mexico) R Zarazúa	7	6
7	(Hungary) P Udvardy	5	2

Second round
(Argentina) S Sierra	6	2	3
(Romania) M Bulgaru	1	6	6
WC	(Australia) A Tomljanović	5	7^{8}	7
(Turkey) İ Öz	7	6^{6}	5
(Czech Republic) S Bejlek	6	7^{7}
(France) L Jeanjean	2	6^{3}
(Greece) D Papamichail	4	2
(Mexico) R Zarazúa	6	6

Quarterfinals
(Romania) M Bulgaru	6^{5}	2
WC	(Australia) A Tomljanović	7^{7}	6
(Czech Republic) S Bejlek	3	3
(Mexico) R Zarazúa	6	6

Semifinals
WC	(Australia) A Tomljanović	6	6
(Mexico) R Zarazúa	1	1

=== Bottom half ===
First round
5	(France) D Parry	2	2
Q	(Romania) A Todoni	6	6
Q	(United States) M Jones	6	6^{r}
WC	(Brazil) G Cé	3	6
(Argentina) ML Carlé	2	6	3
(Slovenia) P Hercog	6	2	6
(Spain) J Bouzas Maneiro	4	1
3	(Argentina) N Podoroska	6	6
8	(United States) E Mandlik	6	6
Q	(Switzerland) C Perrin	3	2
(Argentina) M Capurro Taborda	6	6
WC	(Brazil) C Bohrer Martins	3	4
WC	(Brazil) C Alves	1	2
(France) C Monnet	6	6
Q	(United States) J Loeb	2	0
2	D Shnaider	6	6

Second round
Q	(Romania) A Todoni	6	6
WC	(Brazil) G Cé	1	3
(Slovenia) P Hercog	2	3
3	(Argentina) N Podoroska	6	6
8	(United States) E Mandlik	3	6	3
(Argentina) M Capurro Taborda	6	3	6
(France) C Monnet	6	1	6
2	D Shnaider	4	6	1

Quarterfinals
Q	(Romania) A Todoni
3	(Argentina) N Podoroska	w/o
(Argentina) M Capurro Taborda	7^{9}	6
(France) C Monnet	6^{7}	0

Semifinals
3	(Argentina) N Podoroska	2	1
(Argentina) M Capurro Taborda	6	6

== Qualifying ==
=== Seeds ===
1. (United States) Makenna Jones (qualified)
2. (Romania) Anca Todoni (qualified)
3. (United States) Jamie Loeb (qualified)
4. (Burundi) Sada Nahimana (qualifying competition)

=== Qualifiers ===
1. (United States) Makenna Jones
2. (Romania) Anca Todoni
3. (United States) Jamie Loeb
4. (Switzerland) Conny Perrin

=== Qualifying draw ===
==== First qualifier ====
Qualifying competition
1	(United States) Makenna Jones	6	6
WC	(Brazil) Camilla Bossi	2	0

==== Second qualifier ====
Qualifying competition
2	(Romania) Anca Todoni	6	6
	(Netherlands) Eva Vedder	4	1

==== Third qualifier ====
Qualifying competition
3	(United States) Jamie Loeb	6	6
WC	(Brazil) Luiza Eidelvein	0	0

==== Fourth qualifier ====
Qualifying competition
4	(Burundi) Sada Nahimana	4	4
	(Switzerland) Conny Perrin	6	6
