= 2023 Torneig Internacional de Tennis Femení Solgironès – Singles =

Tennis tournament

Singles
- 2023 Torneig Internacional de Tennis Femení Solgironès

Final
- Champion: (Netherlands) Arantxa Rus
- Runner-up: (Hungary) Panna Udvardy
- Score: 7–6^{(7–2)}, 6–3

Details
- Draw: 32 (4 WC)
- Seeds: 8

Events
Singles	Doubles
- Torneig Internacional de Tennis Femení Solgironès

Arantxa Rus won the title, defeating Panna Udvardy in the final, 7–6^{(7–2)}, 6–3.

Wang Xinyu was the defending champion, but chose not to participate.

This was the seventh edition of the tournament and first as a WTA 125 event.

== Seeds ==
1. (Spain) Rebeka Masarova (semifinals)
2. (Switzerland) Jil Teichmann (quarterfinals)
3. (Hungary) Panna Udvardy (final)
4. (United States) Caroline Dolehide (quarterfinals)
5. (Argentina) Nadia Podoroska (quarterfinals)
6. Diana Shnaider (first round)
7. (Netherlands) Arantxa Rus (champion)
8. (Germany) Tamara Korpatsch (second round)

== Draw ==
Key

- Q = Qualifier
- WC = Wild card
- LL = Lucky loser
- Alt = Alternate
- ITF = ITF entry
- PR = Protected ranking
- SR = Special ranking
- SE = Special exempt
- JE = Junior exempt
- JR = Junior Accelerator Programme entrant
- CO = College Accelerator Programme entrant
- NG = Next Gen Accelerator Program entrant
- w/o = Walkover
- r = Retired
- d = Defaulted

=== Finals ===
Semifinals
1	(Spain) Rebeka Masarova	4	4
3	(Hungary) Panna Udvardy	6	6
7	(Netherlands) Arantxa Rus	6	4	6
(Argentina) María Lourdes Carlé	1	6	3

Final
3	(Hungary) Panna Udvardy	6^{2}	3
7	(Netherlands) Arantxa Rus	7^{7}	6

=== Top half ===
First round
1	(Spain) R Masarova	6	3	6
(Turkey) Ç Büyükakçay	3	6	3
WC	I Khromacheva	2	3
(Switzerland) Y In-Albon	6	6
Q	(Romania) A Prisăcariu	4	5
Q	(Hungary) T Babos	6	7
(Spain) I Burillo Escorihuela	5	6	6^{1}
5	(Argentina) N Podoroska	7	3	7^{7}
3	(Hungary) P Udvardy	6	6
(Bulgaria) S Karatantcheva	3	3
Q	(Georgia (country)) E Gorgodze	6	6
(Spain) J Bouzas Maneiro	2	3
WC	(Spain) Y Cavallé Reimers	3	2
WC	(Spain) G Maristany	6	6
(Slovenia) K Juvan	7^{7}	6
6	D Shnaider	6^{2}	3

Second round
1	(Spain) R Masarova	6	6
(Switzerland) Y In-Albon	1	1
Q	(Hungary) T Babos	3	0
5	(Argentina) N Podoroska	6	6
3	(Hungary) P Udvardy	5	6	6
Q	(Georgia (country)) E Gorgodze	7	0	1
WC	(Spain) G Maristany	4	2
(Slovenia) K Juvan	6	6

Quarterfinals
1	(Spain) R Masarova	3	7^{7}	6
5	(Argentina) N Podoroska	6	6^{4}	4
3	(Hungary) P Udvardy	7^{7}	6
(Slovenia) K Juvan	6^{1}	1

Semifinals
1	(Spain) R Masarova	4	4
3	(Hungary) P Udvardy	6	6

=== Bottom half ===
First round
7	(Netherlands) A Rus	6	6
(Spain) R Vicens Mas	4	3
(Austria) S Kraus	6	5	7^{8}
(Spain) L Romero Gormaz	3	7	6^{6}
(Spain) M Bassols Ribera	6	6
(Germany) K Hobgarski	4	1
(India) A Raina	3	6^{5}
4	(United States) C Dolehide	6	7^{7}
8	(Germany) T Korpatsch	6	6
WC	(Spain) Á Fita Boluda	4	3
(Argentina) ML Carlé	6	6
Q	(Spain) L Cortez Llorca	2	0
E Andreeva	6	6
(United States) A Li	0	3
(Mexico) R Zarazúa	3	1
2	(Switzerland) J Teichmann	6	6

Second round
7	(Netherlands) A Rus	6	7
(Austria) S Kraus	3	5
(Spain) M Bassols Ribera	4	3
4	(United States) C Dolehide	6	6
8	(Germany) T Korpatsch	6^{5}	4
(Argentina) ML Carlé	7^{7}	6
E Andreeva	3	2
2	(Switzerland) J Teichmann	6	6

Quarterfinals
7	(Netherlands) A Rus	2	6	6
4	(United States) C Dolehide	6	2	4
(Argentina) ML Carlé	2	6	6
2	(Switzerland) J Teichmann	6	4	2

Semifinals
7	(Netherlands) A Rus	6	4	6
(Argentina) ML Carlé	1	6	3

== Qualifying ==
=== Seeds ===
1. (Hungary) Tímea Babos (qualified)
2. (Romania) Andreea Prisăcariu (qualified)
3. (Georgia (country)) Ekaterine Gorgodze (qualified)
4. (United States) Maria Mateas (qualifying competition)

=== Qualifiers ===
1. (Hungary) Tímea Babos
2. (Romania) Andreea Prisăcariu
3. (Georgia (country)) Ekaterine Gorgodze
4. (Spain) Lucía Cortez Llorca

=== Draw ===
==== First qualifier ====
Qualifying competition
1	(Hungary) Tímea Babos	6	4	6
	(Argentina) Guillermina Naya	2	6	2

==== Second qualifier ====
Qualifying competition
2	(Romania) Andreea Prisăcariu	6	6
	(Venezuela) Andrea Gámiz	1	0

==== Third qualifier ====
Qualifying competition
3	(Georgia (country)) Ekaterine Gorgodze	3	6	6
	(Spain) Paula Arias Manjón	6	2	0

==== Fourth qualifier ====
Qualifying competition
4	(United States) Maria Mateas	4	6^{6}
	(Spain) Lucía Cortez Llorca	6	7^{8}
