= Zeynep Sönmez =

Turkish tennis player (born 2002)

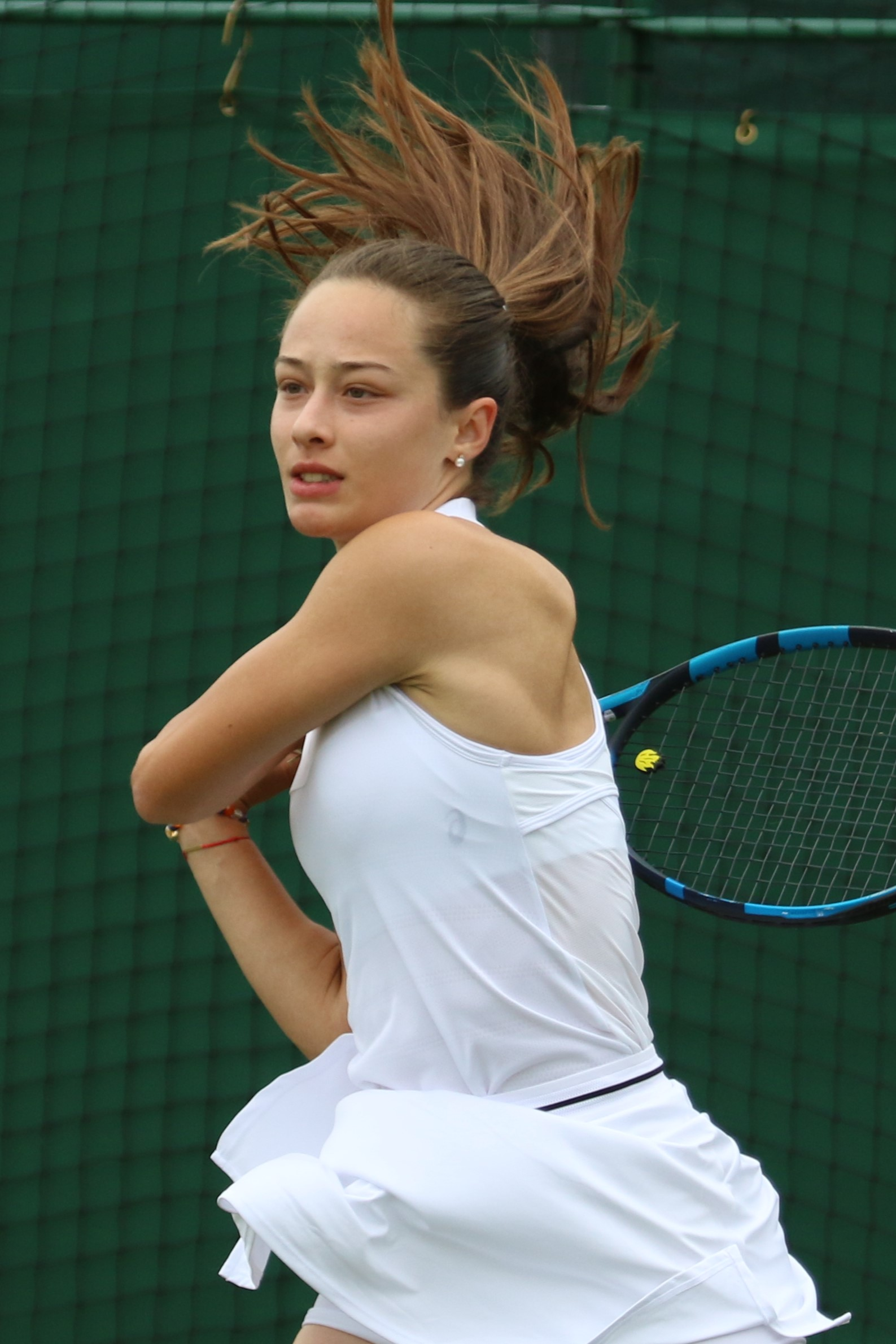
- Sönmez at the 2023 Wimbledon Championships
- Country (sports): Turkey
- Born: 30 April 2002 (age 24) Istanbul, Turkey
- Height: 1.70 m (5 ft 7 in)
- Plays: Right (two-handed backhand)
- Coach: Issam Jellali
- Prize money: $2,431,579

Singles
- Career record: 264–182
- Career titles: 1
- Highest ranking: No. 48 (13 July 2026)
- Current ranking: No. 63 (16 November 2026)

Grand Slam singles results
- Australian Open: 3R (2026)
- French Open: 1R (2024, 2025, 2026)
- Wimbledon: 3R (2025)
- US Open: 2R (2025)

Doubles
- Career record: 19–42
- Career titles: 0
- Highest ranking: No. 147 (2 November 2026)
- Current ranking: No. 150 (16 November 2026)

Grand Slam doubles results
- French Open: 2R (2026)
- Wimbledon: 2R (2025)
- US Open: 3R (2026)

Team competitions
- Fed Cup: 10–4
- Last updated on: 20 November 2026.

Zeynep Sönmez (born 30 April 2002) is a Turkish professional tennis player. She has a career-high singles ranking of world No. 48, achieved on 13 July 2026, making her the highest-ranked Turkish player in WTA history. She is the second Turkish player to reach the top 100 in the WTA rankings, after Çağla Büyükakçay.

Sönmez has won one singles title on the WTA Tour. She also has a best ranking of No. 147 in doubles, achieved in November 2026. Sönmez competes for Turkey in the Billie Jean King Cup, where she has a win/loss record of 10–4 as of November 2026.

== Career ==
=== 2023: WTA Tour debut, Turkish No. 1 ===
In June 2023, Sönmez made her WTA Tour debut at the Rosmalen Open in the Netherlands as a qualifier. She reached her first WTA 125 final at the Ljubljana Open, but lost to Marina Bassols Ribera in straight sets.

=== 2024: First WTA Tour title, major & top 100 debuts ===
Sönmez made her WTA 1000 debut as a wildcard into the Qatar Ladies Open but lost to Lesia Tsurenko. Ranked No. 157, she qualified for her first major main draw at the French Open by defeating Dejana Radanović, Aliaksandra Sasnovich, and Jana Fett in qualifying. She was the first Turkish woman to play in the main draw of the French Open since Çağla Büyükakçay and İpek Soylu in 2017.

In the beginning of the grass-court season, she qualified for the main draw at the Berlin Ladies Open with upset wins over two qualifying seeds, top seed Dayana Yastremska, her first top 30 win, and ninth seed Emina Bektas. She then defeated lucky loser Arantxa Rus in the first round, recording her first WTA Tour main-draw win. She lost to Victoria Azarenka in the round of 16. As a result, she reached a new career-high of No. 136 on 24 June 2024, before the Wimbledon Championships, where she reached the third round of qualifying.

In September, Sönmez reached her first WTA Tour quarterfinal at the Jasmin Open, after advancing through qualifying, and defeated Rebeka Masarova and sixth seed Greet Minnen. She was the first Turkish player to reach a quarterfinal on the tour since 2017, after both Çağla Büyükakçay and Başak Eraydın made quarterfinals in Istanbul. She lost in the last eight to Eva Lys. Ranked No. 148 at the WTA 500 Pan Pacific Open, she qualified for the main draw and upset seventh seed Magdalena Fręch for her second top 30 win.

In November, at the Mérida Open, Sönmez defeated sixth seed María Lourdes Carlé, Elsa Jacquemot, top seed Renata Zarazúa, reaching her first WTA semifinal, and finally Alina Korneeva, making her first final. She defeated Ann Li in straight sets to win her first tour-level singles title and became the first player from Turkey to win a WTA Tour singles title since Çağla Büyükakçay in Istanbul in 2016, and only the second overall. As a result, she reached the top 100 for the first time in her career, at world No. 91 on 4 November 2024.

=== 2025: Wimbledon third round ===
Making her debut at the Australian Open, Sönmez lost in the first round to wildcard entrant Talia Gibson, in three sets.

Defending her title at the Mérida Open, which had been upgraded to a WTA 500 event and switched from October to February, she recorded wins over eighth seed Maria Sakkari and Magda Linette to make it through to the quarterfinals, before losing to top seed and eventual champion, Emma Navarro.

In May at the Rabat Grand Prix, Sönmez overcame third seed Lucia Bronzetti, before losing to wildcard entrant Anastasija Sevastova in the second round. The following week at the French Open, she lost in the first round to 13th seed Elina Svitolina, in straight sets.

At Wimbledon, Sönmez defeated Jaqueline Cristian and Wang Xinyu to become the first player from Turkey to reach the third round of a Grand Slam tournament in the Open Era. Her run was then ended by 18th seed Ekaterina Alexandrova.

In August, Sönmez made her main-draw debut at the US Open and overcame qualifier Katie Volynets, before losing to 27th seed Marta Kostyuk in the second round.

=== 2026: Major third round and top 10 wins ===
In November 2025 former Tunisian tennis pro Ons Jabeur and her longtime coach Issam Jellali joined Sönmez's team as a mentor and her head coach, respectively. At the 2026 Australian Open, the first Grand Slam tournament of the season, Sönmez entered the competition through the qualifying rounds. She won three consecutive matches to secure a place in the main draw. Sönmez defeated world No. 11, Ekaterina Alexandrova, in three sets and advanced to the second round, the first Turkish woman to record a match win at the Australian Open in the Open Era. She reached the third round by defeating Anna Bondár, becoming the first Turkish player in the Open Era to reach the third round of the Australian Open. In the first round of Stuttgart Open, she upset fifth seed Jasmine Paolini, then-world No. 8, in two sets for her first career top-10 win. That was the second singles top-10 victory of any Turkish player, following Çağla Büyükakçay's Fed Cup victory against Jeļena Ostapenko in 2018, and the first-ever in WTA Tour history.

At Wimbledon, she reached the second round by defeating Ann Li, before she was eliminated by Claire Liu in straight sets. In doubles, she lost in the first round alongside Jéssica Bouzas Maneiro.

== Personal life ==
Her family is from the Arhavi district of Artvin.

== Performance timeline ==
Key
W	F	SF	QF	#R	RR	Q#	P#	DNQ	A	Z#	PO	G	S	B	NMS	NTI	P	NH

(W) winner; (F) finalist; (SF) semifinalist; (QF) quarterfinalist; (#R) rounds 4, 3, 2, 1; (RR) round-robin stage; (Q#) qualification round; (P#) preliminary round; (DNQ) did not qualify; (A) absent; (Z#) Davis/Fed Cup Zonal Group (with number indication) or (PO) play-off; (G) gold, (S) silver or (B) bronze Olympic/Paralympic medal; (NMS) not a Masters tournament; (NTI) not a Tier I tournament; (P) postponed; (NH) not held; (SR) strike rate (events won / competed); (W–L) win–loss record.
To avoid confusion and double counting, these charts are updated at the conclusion of a tournament or when the player's participation has ended.

Only main-draw results in WTA Tour, Grand Slam tournaments, Billie Jean King Cup, United Cup, Hopman Cup and Olympic Games are included in win–loss records.

=== Singles ===
Current through the 2026 WTA Tour (but total win–loss needs to be determined for 2023, 2024, 2025 based on AO website).

Tournament	2022	2023	2024	2025	2026	SR	W–L	Win%
Grand Slam tournaments
Australian Open	A	A	Q3	1R	3R	0 / 2	2–2	50%
French Open	A	A	1R	1R	1R	0 / 3	0–3	0%
Wimbledon	A	Q1	Q3	3R	2R	0 / 2	3–2	60%
US Open	A	Q1	Q3	2R	1R	0 / 2	1–2	33%
Win–loss	0–0	0–0	0–1	3–4	3–4	0 / 9	6–9	40%
National representation
Summer Olympics	NH		DNQ	NH		0 / 0	0–0	–
Billie Jean King Cup	RR	RR	RR	RR		0 / 0	5–3	63%
WTA 1000 tournaments
Qatar Open	A	NTI	1R	1R	1R	0 / 3	0–3	0%
Dubai Championships	NTI	A	Q1	A	1R	0 / 1	0–1	0%
Indian Wells Open	A	A	A	Q2	2R	0 / 1	1–1	50%
Miami Open	A	A	A	Q1	2R	0 / 1	1–1	50%
Madrid Open	A	A	A	1R	3R	0 / 2	2–2	50%
Italian Open	A	A	A	Q1	2R	0 / 1	1–1	50%
Canadian Open	A	A	A	A	2R	0 / 1	1–1	50%
Cincinnati Open	A	A	A	A	2R	0 / 1	1–1	50%
China Open	NH	A	Q2	3R	1R	0 / 2	2–2	50%
Wuhan Open	NH		A	Q1	1R	0 / 1	0–1	0%
Win–loss	0–0	0–0	0–1	2–3	7–10	0 / 14	9–14	39%
Career statistics
	2022	2023	2024	2025	2026	SR	W–L	Win%
Tournaments	0 (Note: During the season, she did not play in the main draw of any WTA Tour-level tournaments. However, she played in the Billie Jean King Cup, which is not counted as a played tournament but matches count.)	TBD	TBD	TBD	20	Career total: 20		
Titles	0	0	1	0	0	Career total: 1		
Finals	0	0	1	0	0	Career total: 1		
Overall win–loss	0–1 (Note: BJK loss)				19–20		38–43	47%
Year-end ranking	345	159	91	113		$2,419,259		

== WTA Tour finals ==
=== Singles: 1 (title) ===
Legend WTA 250 (1–0)	Finals by surface Hard (1–0)	Finals by setting Outdoor (1–0)

Result	Date	Tournament	Tier	Surface	Opponent	Score
Win	Oct 2024	Mérida Open, Mexico	WTA 250	Hard	(United States) Ann Li	6–2, 6–1

== WTA 125 finals ==
=== Singles: 1 (runner-up) ===
Result	Date	Tournament	Surface	Opponent	Score
Loss	Sep 2023	Ljubljana Open, Slovenia	Clay	(Spain) Marina Bassols Ribera	0–6, 6–7^{(2–7)}

== ITF Circuit finals ==
=== Singles: 8 (4 titles, 4 runner-ups) ===
Legend W40 tournaments (1–0) W25 tournaments (1–1) W15 tournaments (2–3)	Finals by surface Hard (3–1) Clay (1–3)

Result	W–L	Date	Tournament	Tier	Surface	Opponent	Score
Loss	0–1	Nov 2018	ITF Antalya, Turkey	W15	Hard	(Ukraine) Daria Snigur	6–3, 6–7^{(3)}, 3–6
Loss	0–2	May 2019	ITF Antalya, Turkey	W15	Clay	(Luxembourg) Eléonora Molinaro	5–7, 4–6
Win	1–2	Jan 2020	ITF Antalya, Turkey	W15	Clay	(Greece) Sapfo Sakellaridi	6–3, 2–6, 6–3
Loss	1–3	Mar 2020	ITF Antalya, Turkey	W15	Clay	(Luxembourg) Eléonora Molinaro	2–6, 2–6
Win	2–3	Jul 2022	ITF Monastir, Tunisia	W15	Hard	(Indonesia) Priska Madelyn Nugroho	6–2, 4–6, 7–6^{(1)}
Loss	2–4	Aug 2022	Verbier Open, Switzerland	W25	Clay	(Italy) Matilde Paoletti	2–6, 6–3, 6–7^{(2)}
Win	3–4	Oct 2022	ITF Sozopol, Bulgaria	W25	Hard	Darya Astakhova	7–5, 6–4
Win	4–4	Jan 2023	ITF Tallinn, Estonia	W40	Hard (i)	(Slovakia) Viktória Kužmová	7–6^{(5)}, 3–6, 6–3

== Best Grand Slam results details ==
=== Singles ===
Australian Open
2026 (qualifier)
Round	Opponent	Rank	Score	ZSR
Q1	(Czech Republic) Laura Samson	No. 203	6–2, 6–2	No. 112
Q2	(Argentina) Julia Riera	No. 180	6–3, 6–1	No. 112
Q3	Anastasia Gasanova	No. 212	6–3, 6–2	No. 112
1R	Ekaterina Alexandrova (11)	No. 11	7–5, 4–6, 6–4	No. 112
2R	(Hungary) Anna Bondár	No. 74	6–2, 6–4	No. 112
3R	(Kazakhstan) Yulia Putintseva	No. 94	3-6, 7–6^{(7–3)}, 3–6	No. 112

Wimbledon Championships
2025
Round	Opponent	Rank	Score	ZSR
1R	(Romania) Jaqueline Cristian	No. 52	7–6^{(7–3)}, 6–3	No. 88
2R	(China) Wang Xinyu	No. 32	7–5, 7–5	No. 88
3R	Ekaterina Alexandrova (18)	No. 17	3–6, 6–7^{(1–7)}	No. 88

French Open
2024 (qualifier)
Round	Opponent	Rank	Score	ZSR
Q1	(Serbia) Dejana Radanović	No. 236	6–3, 6–2	No. 157
Q2	Aliaksandra Sasnovich (12)	No. 104	6–7^{(3–7)}, 6–3, 6–4	No. 157
Q3	(Croatia) Jana Fett (21)	No. 126	7–6^{(7–5)}, 6–3	No. 157
1R	(United States) Emma Navarro (22)	No. 24	2–6, 0–6	No. 163
2025
Round	Opponent	Rank	Score	ZSR
1R	(Ukraine) Elina Svitolina (13)	No. 14	1–6, 1–6	No. 76
2026
Round	Opponent	Rank	Score	ZSR
1R	(Australia) Daria Kasatkina	No. 53	4–6, 4–6	No. 66

US Open
2025
Round	Opponent	Rank	Score	ZSR
1R	(United States) Katie Volynets (Q)	No. 109	6–3, 6–4	No. 81
2R	(Ukraine) Marta Kostyuk (27)	No. 28	5–7, 7–6^{(7–5)}, 3–6	No. 81

== Wins against top 10 players ==
- Sönmez's match record against players who were, at the time the match was played, ranked in the top 10.

Season	2026	Total
Wins	1	1

No.	Player	Rk	Event	Surface	Rd	Score	Rk	Years	Ref
1.	(Italy) Jasmine Paolini	8	Stuttgart Grand Prix, Germany	Clay (i)	2R	6–2, 6–2	79	2026	

- Key: (Rk) first use, opponent rank; (Rd) round; (Rk) 2nd use, player rank; (Ref) reference; (F) final; (SF) semifinal; (QF) quarterfinal; (#R) rounds 4, 3, 2, 1; (RR) round-robin stage; (Q#) qualifying rounds or stages (3), 2, 1.
