= 2023 Andorrà Open =

- Date: 27 November–3 December
- Edition: 2nd
- Category: WTA 125
- Draw: 32S / 8D
- Prize money: $115,000
- Surface: Hard (indoor)
- Location: Andorra la Vella, Andorra
- Venue: Poliesportiu d'Andorra

Champions

Singles
- (Spain) Marina Bassols Ribera

Doubles
- Erika Andreeva / (Switzerland) Céline Naef
← 2022 ·	Andorrà Open	· 2024 →

The 2023 Creand Andorrà Open was a professional women's tennis tournament played on indoor hard courts. It was the second edition of the tournament which is also part of the 2023 WTA 125 tournaments, offering a total of $115,000 in prize money. It took place at the Poliesportiu d'Andorra in Andorra la Vella, the capital city of the principality of Andorra between 27 November and 3 December 2023.

== Champions ==
=== Singles ===
- (Spain) Marina Bassols Ribera def. Erika Andreeva, 7–5, 7–6^{(7–3)}

=== Doubles ===
- Erika Andreeva / (Switzerland) Céline Naef def. (Hungary) Tímea Babos / (United Kingdom) Heather Watson 6–2, 6–1

== Singles entrants ==
=== Seeds ===
Country	Player	Rank^{1}	Seed
ESP	Cristina Bucșa	83	1
DEN	Clara Tauson	85	2
FRA	Océane Dodin	93	3
UKR	Dayana Yastremska	105	4
SWE	Rebecca Peterson	108	5
ESP	Marina Bassols Ribera	112	6
GER	Anna-Lena Friedsam	113	7
FRA	Alizé Cornet	118	8

- ^{1} Rankings are as of 20 November 2023.

=== Other entrants ===
The following players received a wildcard into the singles main draw:

- Alina Charaeva
- (France) Sarah Iliev
- (Germany) Ella Seidel
- (Latvia) Anastasija Sevastova

The following player received entry using a protected ranking:

- (Romania) Patricia Maria Țig

The following player received entry as an alternate:

- Ekaterina Reyngold

=== Withdrawals ===
Before the tournament

- (China) Bai Zhuoxuan → replaced by (Turkey) Berfu Cengiz
- (Ukraine) Kateryna Baindl → replaced by Ekaterina Makarova
- (Sweden) Mirjam Björklund → replaced by (United Kingdom) Heather Watson
- (Spain) Aliona Bolsova → replaced by Ekaterina Reyngold
- (France) Clara Burel → replaced by (France) Elsa Jacquemot
- (United Kingdom) Jodie Burrage → replaced by (United States) Elvina Kalieva
- (Romania) Jaqueline Cristian → replaced by (Poland) Katarzyna Kawa
- (Hungary) Dalma Gálfi → replaced by (Hungary) Tímea Babos
- (United States) Ann Li → replaced by (Turkey) Zeynep Sönmez
- Valeria Savinykh → replaced by (Spain) Irene Burillo Escorihuela
- (Italy) Lucrezia Stefanini → replaced by (Andorra) Victoria Jiménez Kasintseva
- (United States) Sachia Vickery → replaced by (Germany) Noma Noha Akugue

== Doubles entrants ==
=== Seeds ===
Country	Player	Country	Player	Rank^{1}	Seed
ESP	Cristina Bucșa		Alexandra Panova	125	1
HUN	Tímea Babos	GBR	Heather Watson	150	2

- ^{1} Rankings as of 20 November 2023.

=== Other entrants ===
The following pair received a wildcard into the doubles main draw:

- Alina Charaeva / (Andorra) Victoria Jiménez Kasintseva
