= 2022 Andorrà Open =

- Date: 28 November–4 December
- Edition: 1st
- Category: WTA 125
- Draw: 32S / 8D
- Prize money: $115,000
- Surface: Hard (indoor)
- Location: Andorra la Vella, Andorra
- Venue: Poliesportiu d'Andorra

Champions

Singles
- (United States) Alycia Parks

Doubles
- (Spain) Cristina Bucșa / (Poland) Weronika Falkowska
| Andorrà Open | · 2023 → |

The 2022 Crèdit Andorrà Open was a professional tennis tournament played on indoor hard courts. It was the first edition of the tournament which is also part of the 2022 WTA 125 tournaments, offering a total of $115,000 in prize money. It took place at the Poliesportiu d'Andorra in Andorra la Vella, the capital city of the Principality of Andorra between 28 November and 4 December 2022. It was the first ever WTA affiliated tennis tournament to be held in Andorra.

== Champions ==
=== Singles ===
- (United States) Alycia Parks def. (Sweden) Rebecca Peterson 6–1, 6–4

=== Doubles ===
- (Spain) Cristina Bucșa / (Poland) Weronika Falkowska def. Angelina Gabueva / Anastasia Zakharova 7–6^{(7–4)}, 6–1

== Singles entrants ==
=== Seeds ===
| Country | Player | Rank^{1} | Seed |
|---|---|---|---|
| CHN | Zhang Shuai | 24 | 1 |
| BEL | Alison Van Uytvanck | 55 | 2 |
| GER | Tatjana Maria | 70 | 3 |
| CZE | Linda Nosková | 91 | 4 |
| UKR | Dayana Yastremska | 101 | 5 |
| ITA | Sara Errani | 106 | 6 |
| UKR | Daria Snigur | 107 | 7 |
| ESP | Cristina Bucșa | 108 | 8 |

- ^{1} Rankings are as of 21 November 2022.

=== Other entrants ===
The following players received a wildcard into the singles main draw:

- Alina Charaeva
- (Spain) Georgina García Pérez
- (Germany) Sabine Lisicki
- (Serbia) Nina Stojanović
- (China) Zhang Shuai

The following players received entry into the singles main draw through protected ranking:

- (Netherlands) Bibiane Schoofs
- (Belgium) Yanina Wickmayer

=== Withdrawals ===
Before the tournament

- Elina Avanesyan → replaced by (France) Jessika Ponchet
- (Italy) Elisabetta Cocciaretto → replaced by (Sweden) Rebecca Peterson
- (Serbia) Olga Danilović → replaced by (Switzerland) Joanne Züger
- Vitalia Diatchenko → replaced by (Israel) Lina Glushko
- (Poland) Magdalena Fręch → replaced by Anastasia Zakharova
- (France) Léolia Jeanjean → replaced by (Poland) Weronika Falkowska
- (United States) Elizabeth Mandlik → replaced by (Ukraine) Kateryna Baindl
- (Spain) Rebeka Masarova → replaced by (France) Carole Monnet
- (France) Kristina Mladenovic → replaced by (United States) Sophie Chang
- (Spain) Nuria Párrizas Díaz → replaced by (Netherlands) Bibiane Schoofs
- (France) Diane Parry → replaced by (United States) Katrina Scott
- Kamilla Rakhimova → replaced by (Romania) Jaqueline Cristian
- (Japan) Moyuka Uchijima → replaced by (Belgium) Yanina Wickmayer
- (Czech Republic) Markéta Vondroušová → replaced by (Uzbekistan) Nigina Abduraimova
- (China) Wang Xinyu → replaced by (Croatia) Ana Konjuh

== Doubles entrants ==
=== Seeds ===
| Country | Player | Country | Player | Rank^{1} | Seed |
|---|---|---|---|---|---|
| USA | Sophie Chang | CHN | Zhang Shuai | 86 | 1 |
| | Alexandra Panova | USA | Alycia Parks | 132 | 2 |

- ^{1} Rankings as of 21 November 2022.

=== Other entrants ===
The following pair received a wildcard into the doubles main draw:

- (Spain) Georgina García Pérez / (Andorra) Victoria Jiménez Kasintseva
