= 2023 Miami Open – Women's singles =

Women's singles
- 2023 Miami Open

Final
- Champion: (Czech Republic) Petra Kvitová
- Runner-up: (Kazakhstan) Elena Rybakina
- Score: 7–6^{(16–14)}, 6–2

Details
- Draw: 96
- Seeds: 32

Events
Singles	men	women
Doubles	men	women
← 2022 ·	Miami Open	· 2024 →

Petra Kvitová defeated Elena Rybakina in the final, 7–6^{(16–14)}, 6–2 to win the women's singles tennis title at the 2023 Miami Open. It was Kvitová's first WTA 1000 title since the 2018 Madrid Open, and her 30th career title overall; she also became the first Czech player to win the title. Rybakina was attempting to complete the Sunshine Double, having already won the title at Indian Wells.

Iga Świątek was the reigning champion, but withdrew before the tournament began due to injury. This was the second consecutive year that the reigning champion pulled out from the tournament, following Ashleigh Barty's retirement from the sport last year.

== Seeds ==
All seeds received a bye into the second round.

1. (Poland) Iga Świątek (withdrew)
2. Aryna Sabalenka (quarterfinals)
3. (United States) Jessica Pegula (semifinals)
4. (Tunisia) Ons Jabeur (second round)
5. (France) Caroline Garcia (second round)
6. (United States) Coco Gauff (third round)
7. (Greece) Maria Sakkari (second round)
8. Daria Kasatkina (second round)
9. (Switzerland) Belinda Bencic (third round)
10. (Kazakhstan) Elena Rybakina (final)
11. Veronika Kudermetova (second round)
12. Liudmila Samsonova (third round)
13. (Brazil) Beatriz Haddad Maia (third round)
14. Victoria Azarenka (third round)
15. (Czech Republic) Petra Kvitová (champion)
16. (Czech Republic) Barbora Krejčíková (fourth round)
17. (Czech Republic) Karolína Plíšková (third round)
18. Ekaterina Alexandrova (quarterfinals)
19. (United States) Madison Keys (third round)
20. (Poland) Magda Linette (fourth round)
21. (Spain) Paula Badosa (third round)
22. (Croatia) Donna Vekić (third round)
23. (China) Zheng Qinwen (fourth round)
24. (Latvia) Jeļena Ostapenko (fourth round)
25. (Italy) Martina Trevisan (quarterfinals)
26. (China) Zhang Shuai (withdrew)
27. Anastasia Potapova (quarterfinals)
28. (Ukraine) Anhelina Kalinina (second round)
29. (Croatia) Petra Martić (third round)
30. (United States) Danielle Collins (third round)
31. (Czech Republic) Marie Bouzková (third round)
32. (China) Zhu Lin (second round)

Click on the seed number of a player to go to their draw section.

== Draw ==
=== Key ===
- Q = Qualifier
- WC = Wild card
- LL = Lucky loser
- Alt = Alternate
- SE = Special exempt
- PR = Protected ranking
- ITF = ITF entry
- JE = Junior exempt
- w/o = Walkover
- r = Retired
- d = Defaulted
- SR = Special ranking

=== Finals ===
Quarterfinals
25	(Italy) Martina Trevisan	3	0
10	(Kazakhstan) Elena Rybakina	6	6
3	(United States) Jessica Pegula	4	6	7^{7}
27	Anastasia Potapova	6	3	6^{2}
18	Ekaterina Alexandrova	4	6	3
15	(Czech Republic) Petra Kvitová	6	3	6
(Romania) Sorana Cîrstea	6	6
2	Aryna Sabalenka	4	4

Semifinals
10	(Kazakhstan) Elena Rybakina	7^{7}	6
3	(United States) Jessica Pegula	6^{3}	4
15	(Czech Republic) Petra Kvitová	7	6
(Romania) Sorana Cîrstea	5	4

Final
10	(Kazakhstan) Elena Rybakina	6^{14}	2
15	(Czech Republic) Petra Kvitová	7^{16}	6

=== Top half ===
==== Section 1 ====
First round
(Czech Republic) K Siniaková	6	3^{r}
(United States) C Liu	3	3
Q	(Japan) N Hibino	6	6
(Montenegro) D Kovinić	3	3
(Italy) J Paolini	6	4	4
Q	(Sweden) M Björklund	4	6	6
(Germany) T Korpatsch	6	4	3
Q	(Czech Republic) T Martincová	4	6	6

Second round
LL	(Austria) J Grabher	4	3
(United States) C Liu	6	6
Q	(Japan) N Hibino	4	3
25	(Italy) M Trevisan	6	6
24	(Latvia) J Ostapenko	6	6
Q	(Sweden) M Björklund	3	4
Q	(Czech Republic) T Martincová	6^{4}	6	0
13	(Brazil) B Haddad Maia	7^{7}	0	6

Third round
(United States) C Liu	6	5	4
25	(Italy) M Trevisan	4	7	6
24	(Latvia) J Ostapenko	6	4	6
13	(Brazil) B Haddad Maia	2	6	3

Fourth round
25	(Italy) M Trevisan	6	6
24	(Latvia) J Ostapenko	3	3

==== Section 2 ====
First round
A Kalinskaya	6	6
WC	(Andorra) V Jiménez Kasintseva	4	2
(Egypt) M Sherif	3	4
Q	(Germany) L Siegemund	6	6
WC	(Czech Republic) B Fruhvirtová	0	5
(China) Xiy Wang	6	7
(Belgium) E Mertens	6	6
(United States) A Parks	1	4

Second round
10	(Kazakhstan) E Rybakina	7	4	6
A Kalinskaya	5	6	3
Q	(Germany) L Siegemund	6^{2}	6	2
21	(Spain) P Badosa	7^{7}	4	6
29	(Croatia) P Martić	6	6
(China) Xiy Wang	3	3
(Belgium) E Mertens	4	6	6
8	D Kasatkina	6	2	2

Third round
10	(Kazakhstan) E Rybakina	3	7	6
21	(Spain) P Badosa	6	5	3
29	(Croatia) P Martić	4	3
(Belgium) E Mertens	6	6

Fourth round
10	(Kazakhstan) E Rybakina	6	6
(Belgium) E Mertens	4	3

==== Section 3 ====
First round
Q	(Canada) K Sebov	6	4	6
(Czech Republic) L Fruhvirtová	2	6	4
Q	(Slovakia) AK Schmiedlová	5	2
LL	(Bulgaria) V Tomova	7	6
(United States) B Pera	3	4
PR	E Rodina	6	6
(Italy) C Giorgi	7^{7}	6^{4}	7^{7}
(Estonia) K Kanepi	6^{4}	7^{7}	6^{4}

Second round
3	(United States) J Pegula	6	6
Q	(Canada) K Sebov	3	1
LL	(Bulgaria) V Tomova	6^{3}	2
30	(United States) D Collins	7^{7}	6
20	(Poland) M Linette	6	6
PR	E Rodina	3	4
(Italy) C Giorgi	3	1
14	V Azarenka	6	6

Third round
3	(United States) J Pegula	6	7^{7}
30	(United States) D Collins	1	6^{0}
20	(Poland) M Linette	7^{7}	2	6
14	V Azarenka	6^{3}	6	4

Fourth round
3	(United States) J Pegula	6	7
20	(Poland) M Linette	1	5

==== Section 4 ====
First round
Q	(Switzerland) V Golubic	7^{7}	6
WC	(United States) H Baptiste	6^{3}	1
WC	(Philippines) A Eala	2	5
(Romania) I-C Begu	6	7
(Ukraine) M Kostyuk	6	6
(Italy) E Cocciaretto	3	2
(Kazakhstan) Y Putintseva	6^{4}	2
(Canada) R Marino	7^{7}	6

Second round
12	L Samsonova	6	6
Q	(Switzerland) V Golubic	1	1
(Romania) I-C Begu	6	1	1
23	(China) Q Zheng	2	6	6
27	A Potapova	6	6
(Ukraine) M Kostyuk	1	3
(Canada) R Marino	4	3
6	(United States) C Gauff	6	6

Third round
12	L Samsonova	7	6^{5}	3
23	(China) Q Zheng	5	7^{7}	6
27	A Potapova	6^{8}	7	6
6	(United States) C Gauff	7^{10}	5	2

Fourth round
23	(China) Q Zheng	4	6^{4}
27	A Potapova	6	7^{7}

=== Bottom half ===
==== Section 5 ====
First round
(Canada) B Andreescu	6	3	6
(United Kingdom) E Raducanu	3	6	2
PR	(United States) S Kenin	6	7^{7}
Q	(Australia) S Hunter	0	6^{5}
(Hungary) A Bondár	4	0
PR	(United States) T Townsend	6	6
Q	(Ukraine) L Tsurenko	4	3
(Canada) L Fernandez	6	6

Second round
7	(Greece) M Sakkari	7	3	4
(Canada) B Andreescu	5	6	6
PR	(United States) S Kenin	6	6
28	(Ukraine) A Kalinina	3	4
18	E Alexandrova	6	5	6
PR	(United States) T Townsend	3	7	4
(Canada) L Fernandez	1	1
9	(Switzerland) B Bencic	6	6

Third round
(Canada) B Andreescu	6	6
PR	(United States) S Kenin	4	4
18	E Alexandrova	7^{10}	6
9	(Switzerland) B Bencic	6^{8}	3

Fourth round
(Canada) B Andreescu	6^{0}	2^{r}
18	E Alexandrova	7^{7}	0

==== Section 6 ====
First round
(Italy) L Bronzetti	3	4
(Czech Republic) L Nosková	6	6
(United States) A Anisimova	6^{5}	2^{r}
(United States) M Brengle	7^{7}	5
WC	E Andreeva	7	6
WC	(United States) A Krueger	5	2
Q	V Gracheva	6	7
(Belgium) M Zanevska	1	5

Second round
15	(Czech Republic) P Kvitová	6	6
(Czech Republic) L Nosková	3	0
(United States) M Brengle	6	4	3
22	(Croatia) D Vekić	4	6	6
LL	(Poland) M Fręch	4	6	6
WC	E Andreeva	6	1	1
Q	V Gracheva	6	6
4	(Tunisia) O Jabeur	2	2

Third round
15	(Czech Republic) P Kvitová	6	7^{7}
22	(Croatia) D Vekić	4	6^{3}
LL	(Poland) M Fręch	1	2
Q	V Gracheva	6	6

Fourth round
15	(Czech Republic) P Kvitová	7	7^{7}
Q	V Gracheva	5	6^{5}

==== Section 7 ====
First round
WC	(Mexico) F Contreras Gómez	6^{6}	2
(Romania) S Cîrstea	7^{8}	6
(Switzerland) J Teichmann	0	2
Q	(Czech Republic) K Muchová	6	6
(China) Xin Wang	3	6	6
Q	(Germany) A-L Friedsam	6	4	2
PR	(Czech Republic) M Vondroušová	6	6
(Germany) T Maria	4	1

Second round
5	(France) C Garcia	2	3
(Romania) S Cîrstea	6	6
Q	(Czech Republic) K Muchová	6	6
32	(China) L Zhu	4	2
17	(Czech Republic) Ka Plíšková	6	6
(China) Xin Wang	2	4
PR	(Czech Republic) M Vondroušová	6	6
11	V Kudermetova	4	2

Third round
(Romania) S Cîrstea	7	6
Q	(Czech Republic) K Muchová	5	1
17	(Czech Republic) Ka Plíšková	1	2
PR	(Czech Republic) M Vondroušová	6	6

Fourth round
(Romania) S Cîrstea	7^{7}	6
PR	(Czech Republic) M Vondroušová	6^{3}	4

==== Section 8 ====
First round
A Sasnovich	6	7^{7}
(Hungary) D Gálfi	3	6^{5}
WC	(United States) R Montgomery	3	6	6
(Romania) A Bogdan	6	3	3
A Blinkova	6	6
(Germany) J Niemeier	4	1
(United States) S Stephens	4	6	2
(United States) S Rogers	6	3	6

Second round
16	(Czech Republic) B Krejčíková	6	6
A Sasnovich	3	2
WC	(United States) R Montgomery	4	4
19	(United States) M Keys	6	6
31	(Czech Republic) M Bouzková	3	6	6
A Blinkova	6	4	3
(United States) S Rogers	4	3
2	A Sabalenka	6	6

Third round
16	(Czech Republic) B Krejčíková	7^{7}	6
19	(United States) M Keys	6^{4}	3
31	(Czech Republic) M Bouzková	1	2
2	A Sabalenka	6	6

Fourth round
16	(Czech Republic) B Krejčíková	3	2
2	A Sabalenka	6	6

== Seeded players ==
The following are the seeded players. Seedings are based on WTA rankings as of March 6, 2023. Rankings and points before are as of March 20, 2023.

Seed	Rank	Player	Points before	Points defending	Points earned	Points after	Status
1	1	~~(Poland) Iga Świątek~~	9,975	1,000	0	8,975	Withdrew due to rib injury
2	2	Aryna Sabalenka	6,740	10	215	6,945	Quarterfinals lost to (Romania) Sorana Cîrstea
3	3	(United States) Jessica Pegula	5,605	390	390	5,605	Semifinals lost to (Kazakhstan) Elena Rybakina [10]
4	5	(Tunisia) Ons Jabeur	4,976	120	10	4,866	Second round lost to Varvara Gracheva [Q]
5	4	(France) Caroline Garcia	4,990	10	10	4,990	Second round lost to (Romania) Sorana Cîrstea
6	6	(United States) Coco Gauff	4,401	120	65	4,346	Third round lost to Anastasia Potapova [27]
7	10	(Greece) Maria Sakkari	3,191	10	10	3,191	Second round lost to (Canada) Bianca Andreescu
8	8	Daria Kasatkina	3,375	10	10	3,375	Second round lost to (Belgium) Elise Mertens
9	9	(Switzerland) Belinda Bencic	3,360	390	65	3,035	Third round lost to Ekaterina Alexandrova [18]
10	7	(Kazakhstan) Elena Rybakina	3,720	65	650	4,305	Runner-up, lost to (Czech Republic) Petra Kvitová [15]
11	11	Veronika Kudermetova	2,470	120	10	2,360	Second round lost to (Czech Republic) Markéta Vondroušová [PR]
12	15	Liudmila Samsonova	2,191	10	65	2,246	Third round lost to (China) Zheng Qinwen [23]
13	14	(Brazil) Beatriz Haddad Maia	2,276	65	65	2,276	Third round lost to (Latvia) Jeļena Ostapenko [24]
14	16	Victoria Azarenka	2,182	65	65	2,182	Third round lost to (Poland) Magda Linette [20]
15	12	(Czech Republic) Petra Kvitová	2,377	215	1,000	3,162	Champion, defeated (Kazakhstan) Elena Rybakina [10]
16	13	(Czech Republic) Barbora Krejčíková	2,324	(1)^{†}	120	2,443	Fourth round lost to Aryna Sabalenka [2]
17	17	(Czech Republic) Karolína Plíšková	2,155	10	65	2,210	Third round lost to (Czech Republic) Markéta Vondroušová [PR]
18	18	Ekaterina Alexandrova	2,005	35	215	2,185	Quarterfinals lost to (Czech Republic) Petra Kvitová [15]
19	21	(United States) Madison Keys	1,652	10	65	1,707	Third round lost to (Czech Republic) Barbora Krejčiková [16]
20	19	(Poland) Magda Linette	1,770	35	120	1,855	Fourth round lost to (United States) Jessica Pegula [3]
21	29	(Spain) Paula Badosa	1,433	215	65	1,283	Third round lost to (Kazakhstan) Elena Rybakina [10]
22	20	(Croatia) Donna Vekić	1,662	(20)^{‡}	65	1,707	Third round lost to (Czech Republic) Petra Kvitová [15]
23	23	(China) Zheng Qinwen	1,594	10	120	1,704	Fourth round lost to Anastasia Potapova [27]
24	22	(Latvia) Jeļena Ostapenko	1,605	10	120	1,715	Fourth round lost to (Italy) Martina Trevisan [25]
25	24	(Italy) Martina Trevisan	1,593	2+29	215+1	1,778	Quarterfinals lost to (Kazakhstan) Elena Rybakina [10]
26	27	~~(China) Zhang Shuai~~	1,460	65	0	1,395	Withdrew
27	26	Anastasia Potapova	1,494	(30)^{‡}	215	1,679	Quarterfinals lost to (United States) Jessica Pegula [3]
28	28	(Ukraine) Anhelina Kalinina	1,452	120	10	1,342	Second round lost to (United States) Sofia Kenin [PR]
29	41	(Croatia) Petra Martić	1,217	2	65	1,280	Third round lost to (Belgium) Elise Mertens
30	30	(United States) Danielle Collins	1,392	215	65	1,242	Third round lost to (United States) Jessica Pegula [3]
31	36	(Czech Republic) Marie Bouzková	1,274	65	65	1,274	Third round lost to Aryna Sabalenka [2]
32	40	(China) Zhu Lin	1,225	20	10	1,215	Second round lost to (Czech Republic) Karolína Muchová [Q]

† The player was not required to count points for the 2022 tournament due to a long-term injury exception. Points from her 16th best result will be deducted instead.
‡ The player did not qualify for the main draw in 2022. Points from her 16th best result will be deducted instead.

== Other entry information ==
=== Wildcards ===
- Erika Andreeva
- (United States) Hailey Baptiste
- (Mexico) Fernanda Contreras Gómez
- (Philippines) Alex Eala
- (Czech Republic) Brenda Fruhvirtová
- (Andorra) Victoria Jiménez Kasintseva
- (United States) Ashlyn Krueger
- (United States) Robin Montgomery

=== Protected ranking ===
- (United States) Sofia Kenin
- Evgeniya Rodina
- (United States) Taylor Townsend
- (Czech Republic) Markéta Vondroušová

=== Withdrawals ===
- (France) Alizé Cornet → replaced by (United States) Taylor Townsend
- (United States) Lauren Davis → replaced by (Bulgaria) Viktoriya Tomova
- (Estonia) Anett Kontaveit → replaced by (Belgium) Maryna Zanevska
- (Colombia) Camila Osorio → replaced by (United Kingdom) Emma Raducanu
- (United States) Alison Riske-Amritraj → replaced by (United States) Madison Brengle
- (Poland) Iga Świątek → replaced by (Austria) Julia Grabher
- (Romania) Patricia Maria Țig → replaced by (Hungary) Anna Bondár
- (Belgium) Alison Van Uytvanck → replaced by (Germany) Tamara Korpatsch
- (China) Zhang Shuai → replaced by (Poland) Magdalena Fręch

== Qualifying ==
=== Seeds ===
1. Varvara Gracheva (qualified)
2. (United States) Caty McNally (first round)
3. (United States) Katie Volynets (first round)
4. (Czech Republic) Karolína Muchová (qualified)
5. (Belgium) Ysaline Bonaventure (first round)
6. Kamilla Rakhimova (first round)
7. (Spain) Cristina Bucșa (first round)
8. (Bulgaria) Viktoriya Tomova (qualifying competition, lucky loser)
9. (Spain) Rebeka Masarova (first round)
10. (Austria) Julia Grabher (qualifying competition, lucky loser)
11. Diana Shnaider (first round)
12. (Ukraine) Lesia Tsurenko (qualified)
13. (Italy) Sara Errani (first round)
14. (Switzerland) Viktorija Golubic (qualified)
15. (Germany) Anna-Lena Friedsam (qualified)
16. (Slovakia) Anna Karolína Schmiedlová (qualified)
17. (Sweden) Rebecca Peterson (first round)
18. (Brazil) Laura Pigossi (first round)
19. (Poland) Magdalena Fręch (qualifying competition, lucky loser)
20. (United Kingdom) Harriet Dart (qualifying competition)
21. (Czech Republic) Tereza Martincová (qualified)
22. (Slovenia) Tamara Zidanšek (qualifying competition)
23. (Australia) Kimberly Birrell (first round)
24. (Germany) Eva Lys (qualifying competition)

=== Qualifiers ===
1. Varvara Gracheva
2. (Germany) Anna-Lena Friedsam
3. (Australia) Storm Hunter
4. (Czech Republic) Karolína Muchová
5. (Sweden) Mirjam Björklund
6. (Canada) Katherine Sebov
7. (Slovakia) Anna Karolína Schmiedlová
8. (Switzerland) Viktorija Golubic
9. (Japan) Nao Hibino
10. (Czech Republic) Tereza Martincová
11. (Germany) Laura Siegemund
12. (Ukraine) Lesia Tsurenko

=== Lucky losers ===
1. (Bulgaria) Viktoriya Tomova
2. (Austria) Julia Grabher
3. (Poland) Magdalena Fręch

=== Qualifying draw ===
==== First qualifier ====
First round
1	Varvara Gracheva	7^{7}	6
(Hungary) Réka Luca Jani	6^{5}	2
(United States) Peyton Stearns	6	6
17	(Sweden) Rebecca Peterson	2	4

Qualifying competition
1	Varvara Gracheva	7^{8}	6
(United States) Peyton Stearns	6^{6}	1

==== Second qualifier ====
First round
2	(United States) Caty McNally	3	7^{7}	3
(Ukraine) Dayana Yastremska	6	6^{4}	6
PR	(Serbia) Olga Danilović	3	4
15	(Germany) Anna-Lena Friedsam	6	6

Qualifying competition
(Ukraine) Dayana Yastremska	6	6^{0}	3
15	(Germany) Anna-Lena Friedsam	1	7^{7}	6

==== Third qualifier ====
First round
3	(United States) Katie Volynets	3	2
(Slovenia) Kaja Juvan	6	6
WC	(Australia) Storm Hunter	6	6
23	(Australia) Kimberly Birrell	3	3

Qualifying competition
(Slovenia) Kaja Juvan	4	3
WC	(Australia) Storm Hunter	6	6

==== Fourth qualifier ====
First round
4	(Czech Republic) Karolína Muchová	6	6
(United Kingdom) Heather Watson	1	1
PR	(Slovakia) Kristína Kučová	7	6
18	(Brazil) Laura Pigossi	5	1

Qualifying competition
4	(Czech Republic) Karolína Muchová	6	6
PR	(Slovakia) Kristína Kučová	1	3

==== Fifth qualifier ====
First round
5	(Belgium) Ysaline Bonaventure	4	6	3
(Sweden) Mirjam Björklund	6	4	6
(Spain) Marina Bassols Ribera	6^{2}	0
22	(Slovenia) Tamara Zidanšek	7^{7}	6

Qualifying competition
(Sweden) Mirjam Björklund	6	3	6
22	(Slovenia) Tamara Zidanšek	3	6	4

==== Sixth qualifier ====
First round
6	Kamilla Rakhimova	4	3
WC	(Canada) Katherine Sebov	6	6
(United Kingdom) Jodie Burrage	6	6
13	(Italy) Sara Errani	1	3

Qualifying competition
WC	(Canada) Katherine Sebov	6^{2}	7	6
(United Kingdom) Jodie Burrage	7^{7}	5	3

==== Seventh qualifier ====
First round
7	(Spain) Cristina Bucșa	6	3	4
(United States) Emma Navarro	2	6	6
WC	(United States) Whitney Osuigwe	3	4
16	(Slovakia) Anna Karolína Schmiedlová	6	6

Qualifying competition
(United States) Emma Navarro	5	6	1
16	(Slovakia) Anna Karolína Schmiedlová	7	2	6

==== Eighth qualifier ====
First round
8	(Bulgaria) Viktoriya Tomova	6	7
WC	(United States) Katrina Scott	2	5
Alt	(Canada) Carol Zhao	3	3
14	(Switzerland) Viktorija Golubic	6	6

Qualifying competition
8	(Bulgaria) Viktoriya Tomova	2	3
14	(Switzerland) Viktorija Golubic	6	6

==== Ninth qualifier ====
First round
9	(Spain) Rebeka Masarova	4	1
(Japan) Nao Hibino	6	6
(Switzerland) Ylena In-Albon	2	3
19	(Poland) Magdalena Fręch	6	6

Qualifying competition
(Japan) Nao Hibino	6	7^{7}
19	(Poland) Magdalena Fręch	4	6^{5}

==== Tenth qualifier ====
First round
10	(Austria) Julia Grabher	7^{9}	7^{7}
WC	(Indonesia) Priska Nugroho	6^{7}	6^{2}
(Switzerland) Simona Waltert	3	2
21	(Czech Republic) Tereza Martincová	6	6

Qualifying competition
10	(Austria) Julia Grabher	6	3	2
21	(Czech Republic) Tereza Martincová	4	6	6

==== Eleventh qualifier ====
First round
11	Diana Shnaider	4	6^{4}
(Germany) Laura Siegemund	6	7^{7}
PR	Vera Zvonareva	4	1
24	(Germany) Eva Lys	6	6

Qualifying competition
(Germany) Laura Siegemund	7	6
24	(Germany) Eva Lys	5	1

==== Twelfth qualifier ====
First round
12	(Ukraine) Lesia Tsurenko	6	6
(United States) CoCo Vandeweghe	3	3
(United Kingdom) Katie Swan	6	2	3
20	(United Kingdom) Harriet Dart	3	6	6

Qualifying competition
12	(Ukraine) Lesia Tsurenko	7^{7}	6
20	(United Kingdom) Harriet Dart	6^{4}	2
