= 2024 Australian Open – Women's singles qualifying =

Tennis event results

Women's singles qualifying
- 2024 Australian Open

Events
| Singles | men | women | | boys | girls |
| Doubles | men | women | mixed | boys | girls |
| WC Singles | men | women | quad | boys | girls |
| WC Doubles | men | women | quad | boys | girls |

Qualification
| Singles | men | women |
- Australian Open

The 2024 Australian Open – Women's singles qualifying is a series of tennis matches that took place from 9 to 12 January 2024 (was originally to start on 8 January, however, it was rescheduled due to rain on the first day) to determine the sixteen qualifiers into the main draw of the women's singles tournament, and, if necessary, the lucky losers.

2021 Australian Open quarterfinalist Hsieh Su-wei played her last professional singles match, losing in the first round of qualifying to Anna Bondár.

== Seeds ==
1. (Ukraine) Dayana Yastremska (qualified)
2. (Mexico) Renata Zarazúa (qualified)
3. (United States) Katie Volynets (qualified)
4. (Spain) Marina Bassols Ribera (second round)
5. Erika Andreeva (second round)
6. (Brazil) Laura Pigossi (first round)
7. (Australia) Arina Rodionova (first round)
8. (United States) Elizabeth Mandlik (first round)
9. (Colombia) Emiliana Arango (first round)
10. (Czech Republic) Brenda Fruhvirtová (qualified)
11. (Hungary) Anna Bondár (qualifying competition)
12. (United Kingdom) Harriet Dart (second round)
13. (Serbia) Olga Danilović (second round)
14. (Spain) Nuria Párrizas Díaz (first round)
15. (Italy) Lucrezia Stefanini (first round)
16. (Australia) Astra Sharma (second round)
17. (Germany) Anna-Lena Friedsam (first round)
18. (Sweden) Rebecca Peterson (second round)
19. (United States) Hailey Baptiste (qualifying competition)
20. (Switzerland) Jil Teichmann (second round)
21. (Slovakia) Rebecca Šramková (first round)
22. (Czech Republic) Sára Bejlek (qualified)
23. (France) Jessika Ponchet (second round)
24. (Ukraine) Daria Snigur (qualified)
25. (Argentina) Julia Riera (qualifying competition)
26. (Germany) Eva Lys (qualifying competition)
27. (United Kingdom) Heather Watson (first round)
28. (Slovakia) Viktória Hrunčáková (first round)
29. (Hungary) Dalma Gálfi (second round)
30. (Switzerland) Céline Naef (second round)
31. (United States) Sachia Vickery (first round)
32. (Latvia) Darja Semeņistaja (second round)

== Qualifiers ==
1. (Ukraine) Dayana Yastremska
2. (Mexico) Renata Zarazúa
3. (United States) Katie Volynets
4. Anastasia Zakharova
5. (France) Fiona Ferro
6. (Australia) Storm Hunter
7. (France) Léolia Jeanjean
8. (Germany) Ella Seidel
9. (Canada) Rebecca Marino
10. (Czech Republic) Brenda Fruhvirtová
11. Alina Korneeva
12. (Ukraine) Yuliia Starodubtseva
13. (Switzerland) Lulu Sun
14. (Ukraine) Daria Snigur
15. (Czech Republic) Sára Bejlek
16. Maria Timofeeva

== Draw ==
=== First qualifier ===
First round
1 | (Ukraine) Dayana Yastremska | 6 | 4 | 6
(Croatia) Lea Bošković | 3 | 6 | 3
(Greece) Valentini Grammatikopoulou | 7 | 6
(United States) Elvina Kalieva | 5 | 3
(Serbia) Natalija Stevanović | 3 | 6 | 5
WC | (Australia) Maya Joint | 6 | 1 | 7
(Hungary) Tímea Babos | 4 | 6 | 4
32 | (Latvia) Darja Semeņistaja | 6 | 2 | 6

Second round
1 | (Ukraine) Dayana Yastremska | 6 | 3 | 6
(Greece) Valentini Grammatikopoulou | 4 | 6 | 4
WC | (Australia) Maya Joint | 6 | 7^{7}
32 | (Latvia) Darja Semeņistaja | 1 | 6^{4}

Qualifying competition
1 | (Ukraine) Dayana Yastremska | 6 | 1 | 6
WC | (Australia) Maya Joint | 2 | 6 | 4

=== Second qualifier ===
First round
2 | (Mexico) Renata Zarazúa | 6 | 6
(Australia) Jaimee Fourlis | 4 | 3
(Germany) Jule Niemeier | 6^{4} | 6 | 6
Anastasia Tikhonova | 7^{7} | 4 | 2
(France) Chloé Paquet | 3 | 6^{5}
(Australia) Destanee Aiava | 6 | 7^{7}
(France) Alice Robbe | 2 | 1
20 | (Switzerland) Jil Teichmann | 6 | 6

Second round
2 | (Mexico) Renata Zarazúa | 6 | 5 | 7^{11}
(Germany) Jule Niemeier | 4 | 7 | 6^{9}
(Australia) Destanee Aiava | 2 | 7 | 6
20 | (Switzerland) Jil Teichmann | 6 | 5 | 1

Qualifying competition
2 | (Mexico) Renata Zarazúa | 6^{5} | 6 | 6
(Australia) Destanee Aiava | 7^{7} | 3 | 4

=== Third qualifier ===
First round
3 | (United States) Katie Volynets | 7^{8} | 7^{7}
(Netherlands) Suzan Lamens | 6^{6} | 6^{4}
Valeria Savinykh | 3 | 6^{7}
(Canada) Carol Zhao | 6 | 7^{9}
(Argentina) Solana Sierra | 4 | 5
(France) Elsa Jacquemot | 6 | 7
(Canada) Stacey Fung | 1 | 4
25 | (Argentina) Julia Riera | 6 | 6

Second round
3 | (United States) Katie Volynets | 6 | 6
(Canada) Carol Zhao | 3 | 1
(France) Elsa Jacquemot | 4 | 2
25 | (Argentina) Julia Riera | 6 | 6

Qualifying competition
3 | (United States) Katie Volynets | 3 | 7^{7} | 7
25 | (Argentina) Julia Riera | 6 | 6^{4} | 5

=== Fourth qualifier ===
First round
4 | (Spain) Marina Bassols Ribera | 6 | 6
PR | (Croatia) Tara Würth | 0 | 2
(Switzerland) Simona Waltert | 6 | 6
(Croatia) Petra Marčinko | 1 | 1
Anastasia Zakharova | 6 | 6
Jana Kolodynska | 1 | 3
(Philippines) Alexandra Eala | 2 | 5
18 | (Sweden) Rebecca Peterson | 6 | 7

Second round
4 | (Spain) Marina Bassols Ribera | 6 | 1 | 3
(Switzerland) Simona Waltert | 2 | 6 | 6
Anastasia Zakharova | 6 | 2 | 6
18 | (Sweden) Rebecca Peterson | 4 | 6 | 4

Qualifying competition
(Switzerland) Simona Waltert | 6^{1} | 1
Anastasia Zakharova | 7^{7} | 6

=== Fifth qualifier ===
First round
5 | Erika Andreeva | 6 | 6
WC | (Australia) Kaylah McPhee | 1 | 2
Polina Kudermetova | 6 | 6
(Spain) Carlota Martínez Círez | 1 | 1
(Japan) Moyuka Uchijima | 6 | 6
Ekaterina Makarova | 2 | 0
(France) Fiona Ferro | 3 | 6 | 6
21 | (Slovakia) Rebecca Šramková | 6 | 4 | 1

Second round
5 | Erika Andreeva | 3 | 2
Polina Kudermetova | 6 | 6
(Japan) Moyuka Uchijima | 4 | 1
(France) Fiona Ferro | 6 | 6

Qualifying competition
Polina Kudermetova | 3 | 6 | 3
(France) Fiona Ferro | 6 | 3 | 6

=== Sixth qualifier ===
First round
6 | (Brazil) Laura Pigossi | 7 | 5 | 0
(Uzbekistan) Nigina Abduraimova | 5 | 7 | 6
(Czech Republic) Dominika Šalková | 7 | 3 | 7
(Croatia) Jana Fett | 5 | 6 | 5
(Estonia) Kaia Kanepi | 3 | 2
(Australia) Storm Hunter | 6 | 6
Tatiana Prozorova | 1 | 0
30 | (Switzerland) Céline Naef | 6 | 6

Second round
(Uzbekistan) Nigina Abduraimova | 5 | 4
(Czech Republic) Dominika Šalková | 7 | 6
(Australia) Storm Hunter | 6 | 7^{7}
30 | (Switzerland) Céline Naef | 3 | 6^{4}

Qualifying competition
(Czech Republic) Dominika Šalková | 6 | 3 | 4
(Australia) Storm Hunter | 3 | 6 | 6

=== Seventh qualifier ===
First round
7 | (Australia) Arina Rodionova | 3 | 4
(France) Léolia Jeanjean | 6 | 6
(France) Séléna Janicijevic | 4 | 1
(France) Carole Monnet | 6 | 6
(Romania) Irina Bara | 6 | 5 | 6
Yuliya Hatouka | 2 | 7 | 3
(Slovenia) Veronika Erjavec | 2 | 3
26 | (Germany) Eva Lys | 6 | 6

Second round
(France) Léolia Jeanjean | 6 | 4 | 6
(France) Carole Monnet | 1 | 6 | 2
(Romania) Irina Bara | 1 | 2
26 | (Germany) Eva Lys | 6 | 6

Qualifying competition
(France) Léolia Jeanjean | 2 | 7^{7} | 6
26 | (Germany) Eva Lys | 6 | 6^{4} | 3

=== Eighth qualifier ===
First round
8 | (United States) Elizabeth Mandlik | 3 | 6 | 4
(Germany) Ella Seidel | 6 | 2 | 6
(France) Margaux Rouvroy | 2 | 4
PR | (United Kingdom) Francesca Jones | 6 | 6
(Netherlands) Arianne Hartono | 7^{7} | 6
(Hungary) Panna Udvardy | 6^{4} | 3
WC | (Australia) Seone Mendez | 3 | 1
19 | (United States) Hailey Baptiste | 6 | 6

Second round
(Germany) Ella Seidel | 6 | 6^{5} | 4
PR | (United Kingdom) Francesca Jones | 3 | 7^{7} | 4^{r}
(Netherlands) Arianne Hartono | 2 | 4
19 | (United States) Hailey Baptiste | 6 | 6

Qualifying competition
(Germany) Ella Seidel | 6 | 6
19 | (United States) Hailey Baptiste | 0 | 4

=== Ninth qualifier ===
First round
9 | (Colombia) Emiliana Arango | 4 | 4
(Canada) Katherine Sebov | 6 | 6
(Spain) Aliona Bolsova | 3 | 3
(Belgium) Ysaline Bonaventure | 6 | 6
(Chinese Taipei) Yang Ya-yi | 6^{3} | 0
(Canada) Rebecca Marino | 7^{7} | 6
(Thailand) Lanlana Tararudee | 6^{5} | 6 | 1
23 | (France) Jessika Ponchet | 7^{7} | 4 | 6

Second round
(Canada) Katherine Sebov | 6^{6} | 6 | 4
(Belgium) Ysaline Bonaventure | 7^{8} | 4 | 0^{r}
(Canada) Rebecca Marino | 6^{5} | 6 | 6
23 | (France) Jessika Ponchet | 7^{7} | 4 | 2

Qualifying competition
(Canada) Katherine Sebov | 0^{r}
(Canada) Rebecca Marino | 2

=== Tenth qualifier ===
First round
10 | (Czech Republic) Brenda Fruhvirtová | 6 | 6
WC | (Australia) Petra Hule | 4 | 4
WC | (Australia) Talia Gibson | 6 | 1 | 6
(Romania) Andreea Mitu | 3 | 6 | 2
(United Kingdom) Lily Miyazaki | 4 | 6^{5}
WC | (Australia) Melisa Ercan | 6 | 7^{7}
(China) Wei Sijia | 6 | 6
28 | (Slovakia) Viktória Hrunčáková | 3 | 2

Second round
10 | (Czech Republic) Brenda Fruhvirtová | 1 | 6 | 7
WC | (Australia) Talia Gibson | 6 | 3 | 5
WC | (Australia) Melisa Ercan
(China) Wei Sijia | w/o

Qualifying competition
10 | (Czech Republic) Brenda Fruhvirtová | 6 | 6
(China) Wei Sijia | 2 | 4

=== Eleventh qualifier ===
First round
11 | (Hungary) Anna Bondár | 7^{7} | 6
PR | (Chinese Taipei) Hsieh Su-wei | 6^{3} | 4
(Croatia) Tena Lukas | 3 | 2
WC | (Australia) Ivana Popovic | 6 | 6
(China) Ma Yexin | 7 | 6
(Romania) Miriam Bulgaru | 5 | 2
Alina Korneeva | 6 | 3 | 7
31 | (United States) Sachia Vickery | 4 | 6 | 5

Second round
11 | (Hungary) Anna Bondár | 6 | 6
WC | (Australia) Ivana Popovic | 4 | 4
(China) Ma Yexin | 7 | 4 | 6^{5}
Alina Korneeva | 5 | 6 | 7^{10}

Qualifying competition
11 | (Hungary) Anna Bondár | 3 | 3
Alina Korneeva | 6 | 6

=== Twelfth qualifier ===
First round
12 | (United Kingdom) Harriet Dart | 6 | 7^{7}
(Italy) Nuria Brancaccio | 2 | 6^{4}
(Ukraine) Yuliia Starodubtseva | 6 | 6
(Argentina) Martina Capurro Taborda | 3 | 0
(Cyprus) Raluka Șerban | 7 | 6
(Greece) Despina Papamichail | 5 | 2
(Czech Republic) Gabriela Knutson | 2 | 6 | 6
17 | (Germany) Anna-Lena Friedsam | 6 | 1 | 2

Second round
12 | (United Kingdom) Harriet Dart | 4 | 4
(Ukraine) Yuliia Starodubtseva | 6 | 6
(Cyprus) Raluka Șerban | 1 | 7 | 1
(Czech Republic) Gabriela Knutson | 6 | 5 | 6

Qualifying competition
(Ukraine) Yuliia Starodubtseva | 6 | 1 | 7^{10}
(Czech Republic) Gabriela Knutson | 4 | 6 | 6^{4}

=== Thirteenth qualifier ===
First round
13 | (Serbia) Olga Danilović | 6 | 6
Iryna Shymanovich | 2 | 0
(China) You Xiaodi | 5 | 2
(Turkey) Zeynep Sönmez | 7 | 6
(Germany) Noma Noha Akugue | 1 | 4
(South Korea) Jang Su-jeong | 6 | 6
(Switzerland) Lulu Sun | 6 | 6
27 | (United Kingdom) Heather Watson | 4 | 3

Second round
13 | (Serbia) Olga Danilović | 6 | 1 | 1
(Turkey) Zeynep Sönmez | 4 | 6 | 6
(South Korea) Jang Su-jeong | 1 | 6 | 4
(Switzerland) Lulu Sun | 6 | 1 | 6

Qualifying competition
(Turkey) Zeynep Sönmez | 4 | 6 | 2
(Switzerland) Lulu Sun | 6 | 3 | 6

=== Fourteenth qualifier ===
First round
14 | (Spain) Nuria Párrizas Díaz | 6 | 3 | 5
WC | (Australia) Maddison Inglis | 4 | 6 | 7
(France) Harmony Tan | 1 | 3
(Ukraine) Katarina Zavatska | 6 | 6
(United States) Ann Li | 6^{4} | 6 | 6
(Czech Republic) Tereza Martincová | 7^{7} | 4 | 4
(Austria) Sinja Kraus | 3 | 0
24 | (Ukraine) Daria Snigur | 6 | 6

Second round
WC | (Australia) Maddison Inglis | 7^{7} | 6
(Ukraine) Katarina Zavatska | 6^{3} | 3
(United States) Ann Li | 4 | 2
24 | (Ukraine) Daria Snigur | 6 | 6

Qualifying competition
WC | (Australia) Maddison Inglis | 2 | 7 | 3
24 | (Ukraine) Daria Snigur | 6 | 5 | 6

=== Fifteenth qualifier ===
First round
15 | (Italy) Lucrezia Stefanini | 3 | 3
(Netherlands) Lesley Pattinama Kerkhove | 6 | 6
(Poland) Katarzyna Kawa | 7 | 4 | 6
(North Macedonia) Lina Gjorcheska | 5 | 6 | 3
(India) Ankita Raina | 6 | 5 | 7^{10}
(Spain) Jéssica Bouzas Maneiro | 4 | 7 | 6^{4}
(Japan) Himeno Sakatsume | 3 | 1
22 | (Czech Republic) Sára Bejlek | 6 | 6

Second round
(Netherlands) Lesley Pattinama Kerkhove | 6 | 6
(Poland) Katarzyna Kawa | 4 | 1
(India) Ankita Raina | 1 | 5
22 | (Czech Republic) Sára Bejlek | 6 | 7

Qualifying competition
(Netherlands) Lesley Pattinama Kerkhove | 3 | 4
22 | (Czech Republic) Sára Bejlek | 6 | 6

=== Sixteenth qualifier ===
First round
16 | (Australia) Astra Sharma | 6^{3} | 6 | 6
(Portugal) Francisca Jorge | 7^{7} | 3 | 3
Darya Astakhova | 2 | 3
Maria Timofeeva | 6 | 6
(Australia) Priscilla Hon | 6 | 7
WC | (Australia) Emerson Jones | 2 | 5
Sofya Lansere | 6 | 4 | 2
29 | (Hungary) Dalma Gálfi | 3 | 6 | 6

Second round
16 | (Australia) Astra Sharma | 2 | 4
Maria Timofeeva | 6 | 6
(Australia) Priscilla Hon | 4 | 6 | 6
29 | (Hungary) Dalma Gálfi | 6 | 3 | 4

Qualifying competition
Maria Timofeeva | 6 | 4 | 6
(Australia) Priscilla Hon | 2 | 6 | 1
