= 2023 Wimbledon Championships – Women's singles qualifying =

Women's singles qualifying
- 2023 Wimbledon Championships

Events
Singles	men	women		boys	girls
Doubles	men	women	mixed	boys	girls
WC Singles	men	women	quad
WC Doubles	men	women	quad
14&U Singles	boys	girls
Legends	men	women	mixed

Qualification
Singles	men	women
- Wimbledon Championships

The 2023 Wimbledon Championships – Women's singles qualifying was a series of tennis matches that took place from 27 to 29 June 2023 to determine the qualifiers for the 2023 Wimbledon Championships – Women's singles event, and, if necessary, the lucky losers.

16 of the 128 qualifiers who compete in this knockout tournament secured a main draw place.

== Seeds ==
The qualifying entry list was released based on the WTA rankings for the week of 29 May 2023. Seedings are based on WTA rankings as of 19 June 2023.

1. Elina Avanesyan (second round)
2. (Netherlands) Arantxa Rus (second round)
3. (Denmark) Clara Tauson (qualifying competition)
4. (United States) Elizabeth Mandlik (second round)
5. Diana Shnaider (second round)
6. (Serbia) Olga Danilović (first round)
7. Mirra Andreeva (qualified)
8. (France) Clara Burel (second round)
9. (United States) Taylor Townsend (qualifying competition)
10. (France) Océane Dodin (second round)
11. (China) Yuan Yue (qualified)
12. (Spain) Aliona Bolsova (first round)
13. (Belgium) Greet Minnen (qualified)
14. (Switzerland) Simona Waltert (qualified)
15. (Australia) Kimberly Birrell (first round)
16. (United States) Kayla Day (second round)
17. (Belgium) Yanina Wickmayer (qualified)
18. (Italy) Lucrezia Stefanini (qualified)
19. (Germany) Tamara Korpatsch (qualifying competition, lucky loser)
20. (South Korea) Jang Su-jeong (first round)
21. (Slovakia) Viktória Hrunčáková (qualified)
22. (Japan) Nao Hibino (qualifying competition, lucky loser)
23. (United States) Sofia Kenin (qualified)
24. (France) Jessika Ponchet (first round)
25. (Spain) Marina Bassols Ribera (qualifying competition)
26. (Brazil) Laura Pigossi (first round)
27. (Australia) Olivia Gadecki (qualifying competition)
28. (Czech Republic) Brenda Fruhvirtová (qualifying competition)
29. (Switzerland) Viktorija Golubic (qualified)
30. (Slovenia) Tamara Zidanšek (second round)
31. (Argentina) María Lourdes Carlé (second round)
32. (United States) Ashlyn Krueger (second round)

== Qualifiers ==
1. (Australia) Storm Hunter
2. (Canada) Carol Zhao
3. (Slovakia) Viktória Hrunčáková
4. (Serbia) Natalija Stevanović
5. (China) Bai Zhuoxuan
6. (Belgium) Yanina Wickmayer
7. Mirra Andreeva
8. (Spain) Jéssica Bouzas Maneiro
9. (United States) Sofia Kenin
10. (Switzerland) Viktorija Golubic
11. (China) Yuan Yue
12. (Slovenia) Kaja Juvan
13. (Belgium) Greet Minnen
14. (Switzerland) Simona Waltert
15. (Switzerland) Céline Naef
16. (Italy) Lucrezia Stefanini

== Lucky losers ==
1. (Germany) Tamara Korpatsch
2. (Japan) Nao Hibino

== Draw ==
Key

- Q = Qualifier
- WC = Wild card
- LL = Lucky loser
- Alt = Alternate
- ITF = ITF entry
- PR = Protected ranking
- SR = Special ranking
- SE = Special exempt
- JE = Junior exempt
- JR = Junior Accelerator Programme entrant
- CO = College Accelerator Programme entrant
- NG = Next Gen Accelerator Program entrant
- w/o = Walkover
- r = Retired
- d = Defaulted

=== First qualifier ===
First round
1	Elina Avanesyan	6	6
(Mexico) Fernanda Contreras	3	0
WC	(United Kingdom) Mingge Xu	5	4
(Australia) Storm Hunter	7	6
(Hungary) Réka Luca Jani	6	7^{8}
WC	(United Kingdom) Hannah Klugman	1	6^{6}
Anastasia Zakharova	4	3
22	(Japan) Nao Hibino	6	6

Second round
1	Elina Avanesyan	6^{1}	6^{2}
(Australia) Storm Hunter	7^{7}	7^{7}
(Hungary) Réka Luca Jani	3	3
22	(Japan) Nao Hibino	6	6

Qualifying competition
(Australia) Storm Hunter	6	6
22	(Japan) Nao Hibino	3	4

=== Second qualifier ===
First round
2	(Netherlands) Arantxa Rus	7^{7}	6
(Ukraine) Daria Snigur	6^{1}	4
WC	(United Kingdom) Emily Appleton	6	6^{4}	4
(Canada) Carol Zhao	4	7^{7}	6
PR	(Liechtenstein) Kathinka von Deichmann	3	7	4
(Czech Republic) Barbora Palicová	6	5	6
(United States) CoCo Vandeweghe	6	2	6
20	(South Korea) Jang Su-jeong	3	6	3

Second round
2	(Netherlands) Arantxa Rus	6	4	2
(Canada) Carol Zhao	3	6	6
(Czech Republic) Barbora Palicová	4	6^{0}
(United States) CoCo Vandeweghe	6	7^{7}

Qualifying competition
(Canada) Carol Zhao	7^{7}	6
(United States) CoCo Vandeweghe	6^{4}	4

=== Third qualifier ===
First round
3	(Denmark) Clara Tauson	6	6
(United States) Emina Bektas	4	4
Iryna Shymanovich	3	7	5
(Slovakia) Rebecca Šramková	6	5	7
PR	(Slovenia) Polona Hercog	3	6	3
(Australia) Jaimee Fourlis	6	4	6
(Argentina) Paula Ormaechea	2	1
21	(Slovakia) Viktória Hrunčáková	6	6

Second round
3	(Denmark) Clara Tauson	6	6
(Slovakia) Rebecca Šramková	4	2
(Australia) Jaimee Fourlis	1	3
21	(Slovakia) Viktória Hrunčáková	6	6

Qualifying competition
3	(Denmark) Clara Tauson	5	6	3
21	(Slovakia) Viktória Hrunčáková	7	4	6

=== Fourth qualifier ===
First round
4	(United States) Elizabeth Mandlik	7	6
(France) Elsa Jacquemot	5	3
(Greece) Valentini Grammatikopoulou	2	1
(Serbia) Natalija Stevanović	6	6
(Germany) Eva Lys	6	7
(France) Kristina Mladenovic	0	5
(Czech Republic) Lucie Havlíčková	6^{4}	3
25	(Spain) Marina Bassols Ribera	7^{7}	6

Second round
4	(United States) Elizabeth Mandlik	2	2
(Serbia) Natalija Stevanović	6	6
(Germany) Eva Lys	2	4
25	(Spain) Marina Bassols Ribera	6	6

Qualifying competition
(Serbia) Natalija Stevanović	7	7
25	(Spain) Marina Bassols Ribera	5	5

=== Fifth qualifier ===
First round
5	Diana Shnaider	7	6
WC	(United States) Liv Hovde	5	2
(Andorra) Victoria Jiménez Kasintseva	6	5	3
WC	(United Kingdom) Anna Brogan	4	7	6
Maria Timofeeva	3	2
(China) Bai Zhuoxuan	6	6
PR	(Switzerland) Susan Bandecchi	6	1	2
31	(Argentina) María Lourdes Carlé	4	6	6

Second round
5	Diana Shnaider	3	6^{7}
WC	(United Kingdom) Anna Brogan	6	7^{9}
(China) Bai Zhuoxuan	2	6	7^{10}
31	(Argentina) María Lourdes Carlé	6	3	6^{5}

Qualifying competition
WC	(United Kingdom) Anna Brogan	3	0
(China) Bai Zhuoxuan	6	6

=== Sixth qualifier ===
First round
6	(Serbia) Olga Danilović	5	6^{8}
PR	(Slovakia) Jana Čepelová	7	7^{10}
(Germany) Laura Siegemund	6	6
(Australia) Arina Rodionova	2	1
(Romania) Elena-Gabriela Ruse	7	6
WC	(United Kingdom) Isabelle Lacy	5	2
(Netherlands) Arianne Hartono	4	3
17	(Belgium) Yanina Wickmayer	6	6

Second round
PR	(Slovakia) Jana Čepelová	3	4
(Germany) Laura Siegemund	6	6
(Romania) Elena-Gabriela Ruse	6	3	3
17	(Belgium) Yanina Wickmayer	4	6	6

Qualifying competition
(Germany) Laura Siegemund	4	7	3
17	(Belgium) Yanina Wickmayer	6	5	6

=== Seventh qualifier ===
First round
7	Mirra Andreeva	6	6
(Spain) Rosa Vicens Mas	3	1
(Mexico) Marcela Zacarías	5	0
(France) Chloé Paquet	7	6
(France) Carole Monnet	6	6
PR	(Poland) Maja Chwalińska	1	3
(Japan) Mai Hontama	1	7	4
19	(Germany) Tamara Korpatsch	6	5	6

Second round
7	Mirra Andreeva	6	6
(France) Chloé Paquet	1	2
(France) Carole Monnet	4	1
19	(Germany) Tamara Korpatsch	6	6

Qualifying competition
7	Mirra Andreeva	7	5	6
19	(Germany) Tamara Korpatsch	5	7	2

=== Eighth qualifier ===
First round
8	(France) Clara Burel	7	2	7
(Japan) Himeno Sakatsume	5	6	5
(Spain) Jéssica Bouzas Maneiro	3	7^{7}	6
(India) Ankita Raina	6	6^{5}	1
(United States) Ann Li	6	6
(Serbia) Aleksandra Krunić	1	1
(United States) Katrina Scott	3	4
27	(Australia) Olivia Gadecki	6	6

Second round
8	(France) Clara Burel	6	2	2
(Spain) Jéssica Bouzas Maneiro	4	6	6
(United States) Ann Li	3	1
27	(Australia) Olivia Gadecki	6	6

Qualifying competition
(Spain) Jéssica Bouzas Maneiro	6	6
27	(Australia) Olivia Gadecki	3	3

=== Ninth qualifier ===
First round
9	(United States) Taylor Townsend	6	6
(Romania) Irina Bara	3	1
(Germany) Noma Noha Akugue	1
(France) Séléna Janicijevic	2^{r}
(Japan) Moyuka Uchijima	7^{7}	4	6
(Uzbekistan) Nigina Abduraimova	6^{5}	6	4
PR	(United States) Irina Falconi Hartman	3	2
23	(United States) Sofia Kenin	6	6

Second round
9	(United States) Taylor Townsend	6	6
(Germany) Noma Noha Akugue	2	4
(Japan) Moyuka Uchijima	0	3
23	(United States) Sofia Kenin	6	6

Qualifying competition
9	(United States) Taylor Townsend	3	3
23	(United States) Sofia Kenin	6	6

=== Tenth qualifier ===
First round
10	(France) Océane Dodin	6	6
(Germany) Mona Barthel	4	4
(Turkey) Zeynep Sönmez	3	6	4
(Greece) Despina Papamichail	6	3	6
(Ukraine) Katarina Zavatska	6	2	3
WC	(United Kingdom) Naiktha Bains	4	6	6
(Sweden) Mirjam Björklund	6	4	3
29	(Switzerland) Viktorija Golubic	4	6	6

Second round
10	(France) Océane Dodin	6^{8}	6^{3}
(Greece) Despina Papamichail	7^{10}	7^{7}
WC	(United Kingdom) Naiktha Bains	6	3	2
29	(Switzerland) Viktorija Golubic	3	6	6

Qualifying competition
(Greece) Despina Papamichail	2	6^{5}
29	(Switzerland) Viktorija Golubic	6	7^{7}

=== Eleventh qualifier ===
First round
11	(China) Yuan Yue	6	6
PR	(Netherlands) Bibiane Schoofs	2	0
(South Korea) Han Na-lae	2	4
(United Kingdom) Yuriko Miyazaki	6	6
(Canada) Katherine Sebov	6	6
(Italy) Nuria Brancaccio	2	2
(Czech Republic) Sára Bejlek	0	5
28	(Czech Republic) Brenda Fruhvirtová	6	7

Second round
11	(China) Yuan Yue	6	6
(United Kingdom) Yuriko Miyazaki	3	4
(Canada) Katherine Sebov	0	3
28	(Czech Republic) Brenda Fruhvirtová	6	6

Qualifying competition
11	(China) Yuan Yue	3	6	6
28	(Czech Republic) Brenda Fruhvirtová	6	4	3

=== Twelfth qualifier ===
First round
12	(Spain) Aliona Bolsova	7	4	2
(Austria) Sinja Kraus	5	6	6
(Spain) Leyre Romero Gormaz	5	4
(Cyprus) Raluca Șerban	7	6
(Hungary) Tímea Babos	2	3
(Slovenia) Kaja Juvan	6	6
Darya Astakhova	6	4	4
30	(Slovenia) Tamara Zidanšek	3	6	6

Second round
(Austria) Sinja Kraus	6	7
(Cyprus) Raluca Șerban	4	5
(Slovenia) Kaja Juvan	6	6
30	(Slovenia) Tamara Zidanšek	4	4

Qualifying competition
(Austria) Sinja Kraus	6	4	4
(Slovenia) Kaja Juvan	3	6	6

=== Thirteenth qualifier ===
First round
13	(Belgium) Greet Minnen	6	7
(Canada) Eugenie Bouchard	4	5
(United States) Robin Montgomery	6	6
(Belgium) Magali Kempen	4	2
(Latvia) Darja Semeņistaja	6	6
(Belgium) Marie Benoît	4	0
PR	Vera Zvonareva	5	7^{7}	6
26	(Brazil) Laura Pigossi	7	6^{5}	2

Second round
13	(Belgium) Greet Minnen	6	7^{7}
(United States) Robin Montgomery	4	6^{5}
(Latvia) Darja Semeņistaja	6	6
PR	Vera Zvonareva	4	1

Qualifying competition
13	(Belgium) Greet Minnen	6	6
(Latvia) Darja Semeņistaja	2	3

=== Fourteenth qualifier ===
First round
14	(Switzerland) Simona Waltert	6	6
(France) Léolia Jeanjean	2	4
WC	(United Kingdom) Eden Silva	3	3
(Argentina) Julia Riera	6	6
(Croatia) Ana Konjuh	6	6
(Switzerland) Ylena In-Albon	4	4
(Colombia) Emiliana Arango	1	6	6
24	(France) Jessika Ponchet	6	3	4

Second round
14	(Switzerland) Simona Waltert	6	7^{7}
(Argentina) Julia Riera	0	6^{3}
(Croatia) Ana Konjuh	5	1
(Colombia) Emiliana Arango	7	6

Qualifying competition
14	(Switzerland) Simona Waltert	6	7
(Colombia) Emiliana Arango	4	5

=== Fifteenth qualifier ===
First round
15	(Australia) Kimberly Birrell	4	3
(Ukraine) Dayana Yastremska	6	6
(Slovenia) Dalila Jakupović	6	4	4
Erika Andreeva	3	6	6
(Switzerland) Céline Naef	7^{7}	6
Kristina Dmitruk	6^{3}	0
(France) Alice Robbe	4	6	1
32	(United States) Ashlyn Krueger	6	3	6

Second round
(Ukraine) Dayana Yastremska	6	6
Erika Andreeva	3	4
(Switzerland) Céline Naef	6	6
32	(United States) Ashlyn Krueger	4	2

Qualifying competition
(Ukraine) Dayana Yastremska	2	6	4
(Switzerland) Céline Naef	6	3	6

=== Sixteenth qualifier ===
First round
16	(United States) Kayla Day	7	2	7^{10}
(Netherlands) Lesley Pattinama Kerkhove	5	6	6^{4}
(United States) Sachia Vickery	1	4
PR	(Chinese Taipei) Hsieh Su-wei	6	6
(Australia) Priscilla Hon	6	6
PR	(France) Amandine Hesse	2	3
(Brazil) Carolina Alves	1	2
18	(Italy) Lucrezia Stefanini	6	6

Second round
16	(United States) Kayla Day	2	3
PR	(Chinese Taipei) Hsieh Su-wei	6	6
(Australia) Priscilla Hon	2	6^{4}
18	(Italy) Lucrezia Stefanini	6	7^{7}

Qualifying competition
PR	(Chinese Taipei) Hsieh Su-wei	2	7^{7}	6^{9}
18	(Italy) Lucrezia Stefanini	6	6^{3}	7^{11}
