= 2023 Andorrà Open – Singles =

Singles
- 2023 Andorrà Open

Final
- Champion: (Spain) Marina Bassols Ribera
- Runner-up: Erika Andreeva
- Score: 7–5, 7–6^{(7–3)}

Details
- Draw: 32 (4 WC)
- Seeds: 8

Events
Singles	Doubles
← 2022 ·	Andorrà Open	· 2024 →

Marina Bassols Ribera won the singles title at the 2023 Andorrà Open, defeating Erika Andreeva in the final, 7–5, 7–6^{(7–3)}.

Alycia Parks was the reigning champion, but did not participate this year.

== Seeds ==
1. (Spain) Cristina Bucșa (first round)
2. (Denmark) Clara Tauson (quarterfinals)
3. (France) Océane Dodin (first round)
4. (Ukraine) Dayana Yastremska (second round)
5. (Sweden) Rebecca Peterson (first round)
6. (Spain) Marina Bassols Ribera (champion)
7. (Germany) Anna-Lena Friedsam (second round)
8. (France) Alizé Cornet (semifinals)

== Draw ==
=== Key ===
- Q = Qualifier
- WC = Wild card
- LL = Lucky loser
- Alt = Alternate
- ITF = ITF entry
- PR = Protected ranking
- SR = Special ranking
- SE = Special exempt
- JE = Junior exempt
- JR = Junior Accelerator Programme entrant
- CO = College Accelerator Programme entrant
- NG = Next Gen Accelerator Program entrant
- w/o = Walkover
- r = Retired
- d = Defaulted

=== Finals ===
Semifinals
Erika Andreeva	6^{6}	7	6
(United Kingdom) Heather Watson	7^{8}	5	0
6	(Spain) Marina Bassols Ribera	6	6
8	(France) Alizé Cornet	4	2

Final
Erika Andreeva	5	6^{3}
6	(Spain) Marina Bassols Ribera	7	7^{7}

=== Top half ===
First round
1	(Spain) C Bucșa	6	3	4
(Switzerland) C Naef	4	6	6
(Switzerland) S Bandecchi	3	4
E Andreeva	6	6
(Turkey) Z Sönmez	1	0
WC	(Germany) E Seidel	6	6
(Turkey) B Cengiz	4	4
7	(Germany) A-L Friedsam	6	6
3	(France) O Dodin	6	2	2
WC	A Charaeva	3	6	6
(Hungary) T Babos	5	0
(United Kingdom) H Watson	7	6
(Czech Republic) T Martincová	4	6	5
(France) J Ponchet	6	1	7
(France) E Jacquemot	6	4	6
5	(Sweden) R Peterson	2	6	3

Second round
(Switzerland) C Naef	6	4	4
E Andreeva	2	6	6
WC	(Germany) E Seidel	6	6
7	(Germany) A-L Friedsam	4	4
WC	A Charaeva	2	1
(United Kingdom) H Watson	6	6
(France) J Ponchet	4	6	7^{7}
(France) E Jacquemot	6	4	6^{4}

Quarterfinals
E Andreeva	6	7
WC	(Germany) E Seidel	4	5
(United Kingdom) H Watson	w/o
(France) J Ponchet

Semifinals
E Andreeva	6^{6}	7	6
(United Kingdom) H Watson	7^{8}	5	0

=== Bottom half ===
First round
6	(Spain) M Bassols Ribera	6	7
(Germany) N Noha Akugue	3	5
(United States) E Kalieva	5	5
Alt	E Reyngold	7	7
WC	(Latvia) A Sevastova	6^{6}	6	6
(Spain) I Burillo Escorihuela	7^{8}	2	1
E Makarova	2	2
4	(Ukraine) D Yastremska	6	6
8	(France) A Cornet	1	7^{7}	6
(Turkey) Ç Büyükakçay	6	6^{4}	3
PR	(Romania) PM Țig	5	2
(Spain) N Párrizas Díaz	7	6
WC	(France) S Iliev	4	2
(Poland) K Kawa	6	6
(Andorra) V Jiménez Kasintseva	2	4
2	(Denmark) C Tauson	6	6

Second round
6	(Spain) M Bassols Ribera	6	6
Alt	E Reyngold	3	2
WC	(Latvia) A Sevastova	6^{3}	6	6
4	(Ukraine) D Yastremska	7^{7}	1	4
8	(France) A Cornet	6	2	6
(Spain) N Párrizas Díaz	1	6	1
(Poland) K Kawa	1	2
2	(Denmark) C Tauson	6	6

Quarterfinals
6	(Spain) M Bassols Ribera	2	7^{7}	6
WC	(Latvia) A Sevastova	6	6^{4}	4
8	(France) A Cornet	6	6
2	(Denmark) C Tauson	3	4

Semifinals
6	(Spain) M Bassols Ribera	6	6
8	(France) A Cornet	4	2
