= 2023 Andorrà Open – Doubles =

Doubles
- 2023 Andorrà Open

Final
- Champions: Erika Andreeva (Switzerland) Céline Naef
- Runners-up: (Hungary) Tímea Babos (United Kingdom) Heather Watson
- Score: 6–2, 6–1

Details
- Draw: 8 (1 WC)
- Seeds: 2

Events
Singles	Doubles
← 2022 ·	Andorrà Open	· 2024 →

Erika Andreeva and Céline Naef claimed the doubles title at the 2023 Andorrà Open, defeating Tímea Babos and Heather Watson in the final, 6–2, 6–1.

Cristina Bucșa and Weronika Falkowska were the defending champions, but chose to participate with different partners. Bucșa partnered Alexandra Panova but lost in the first round to Falkowska and Katarzyna Kawa. Falkowska and Kawa then lost in the semifinals to Andreeva and Naef.

== Seeds ==
1. (Spain) Cristina Bucșa / Alexandra Panova (first round)
2. (Hungary) Tímea Babos / (United Kingdom) Heather Watson (final)

== Draw ==
=== Key ===
- Q = Qualifier
- WC = Wild card
- LL = Lucky loser
- Alt = Alternate
- SE = Special exempt
- PR = Protected ranking
- ITF = ITF entry
- JE = Junior exempt
- w/o = Walkover
- r = Retired
- d = Defaulted
- SR = Special ranking

=== Draw ===
Quarterfinals
1	(Spain) C Bucșa; A Panova	6	3	[5]
(Poland) W Falkowska (Poland) K Kawa	3	6	[10]
E Andreeva (Switzerland) C Naef	6	6
WC	A Charaeva (Andorra) V Jiménez Kasintseva	3	3
(United Kingdom) M Lumsden (France) J Ponchet	6	2	[10]
(United Kingdom) O Nicholls (Netherlands) B Schoofs	4	6	[8]
(United Kingdom) A Barnett (United Kingdom) S Murray Sharan	2	2
2	(Hungary) T Babos (United Kingdom) H Watson	6	6

Semifinals
(Poland) W Falkowska (Poland) K Kawa	4	6	[8]
E Andreeva (Switzerland) C Naef	6	3	[10]
(United Kingdom) M Lumsden (France) J Ponchet
2	(Hungary) T Babos (United Kingdom) H Watson	w/o

Final
Erika Andreeva (Switzerland) Céline Naef	6	6
2	(Hungary) Tímea Babos (United Kingdom) Heather Watson	2	1
