= 2022 Andorrà Open – Doubles =

Doubles
- 2022 Andorrà Open

Final
- Champions: (Spain) Cristina Bucșa (Poland) Weronika Falkowska
- Runners-up: Angelina Gabueva; Anastasia Zakharova
- Score: 7–6^{(7–4)}, 6–1

Details
- Draw: 8 (1 WC)
- Seeds: 2

Events
Singles	Doubles
Andorrà Open	· 2023 →

This was the first edition of the tournament.

Cristina Bucșa and Weronika Falkowska won the title, defeating Angelina Gabueva and Anastasia Zakharova in the final, 7–6^{(7–4)}, 6–1.

== Seeds ==
1. (United States) Sophie Chang / (China) Zhang Shuai (quarterfinals, withdrew)
2. Alexandra Panova / (United States) Alycia Parks (semifinals)

== Draw ==
=== Key ===
- Q = Qualifier
- WC = Wild card
- LL = Lucky loser
- Alt = Alternate
- SE = Special exempt
- PR = Protected ranking
- ITF = ITF entry
- JE = Junior exempt
- w/o = Walkover
- r = Retired
- d = Defaulted
- SR = Special ranking

=== Draw ===
Quarterfinals
1	(United States) S Chang (China) S Zhang
(Spain) C Bucșa (Poland) W Falkowska	w/o
SR	(France) J Ponchet (Czech Republic) R Voráčová	4	7	[6]
(Germany) V Heisen (Ukraine) N Kichenok	6	5	[10]
(Netherlands) B Schoofs (Netherlands) R van der Hoek	4	1
A Gabueva; A Zakharova	6	6
WC	(Spain) G García Pérez (Andorra) V Jiménez Kasintseva	1	2
2	A Panova (United States) A Parks	6	6

Semifinals
(Spain) C Bucșa (Poland) W Falkowska	6	6
(Germany) V Heisen (Ukraine) N Kichenok	4	3
A Gabueva; A Zakharova	6	7^{7}
2	A Panova (United States) A Parks	2	6^{2}

Final
(Spain) C Bucșa (Poland) W Falkowska	7^{7}	6
A Gabueva; A Zakharova	6^{4}	1
