= 2022 Andorrà Open – Singles =

Singles
- 2022 Andorrà Open

Final
- Champion: (United States) Alycia Parks
- Runner-up: (Sweden) Rebecca Peterson
- Score: 6–1, 6–4

Details
- Draw: 32 (5 WC)
- Seeds: 8

Events
Singles	Doubles
Andorrà Open	· 2023 →

This was the first edition of the tournament.

Alycia Parks won the title, defeating Rebecca Peterson in the final, 6–1, 6–4.

== Seeds ==
1. (China) Zhang Shuai (quarterfinals)
2. (Belgium) Alison Van Uytvanck (quarterfinals)
3. (Germany) Tatjana Maria (second round)
4. (Czech Republic) Linda Nosková (first round)
5. (Ukraine) Dayana Yastremska (second round)
6. (Italy) Sara Errani (first round)
7. (Ukraine) Daria Snigur (second round)
8. (Spain) Cristina Bucșa (semifinals)

== Draw ==
=== Key ===
- Q = Qualifier
- WC = Wild card
- LL = Lucky loser
- Alt = Alternate
- SE = Special exempt
- PR = Protected ranking
- ITF = ITF entry
- JE = Junior exempt
- w/o = Walkover
- r = Retired
- d = Defaulted
- SR = Special ranking

=== Finals ===
Semifinals
(Sweden) Rebecca Peterson	6	6
(Croatia) Ana Konjuh	3	1
(United States) Alycia Parks	6	6
8	(Spain) Cristina Bucșa	3	3

Final
(Sweden) Rebecca Peterson	1	4
(United States) Alycia Parks	6	6

=== Top half ===
First round
1/WC	(China) S Zhang	6	6
WC	(Serbia) N Stojanović	1	4
(United States) S Chang	6	7
SR	(Netherlands) B Schoofs	3	5
(Sweden) R Peterson	6	7
(Netherlands) A Rus	4	5
WC	(Spain) G García Pérez	1	2
7	(Ukraine) D Snigur	6	6
3	(Germany) T Maria	6	6
(Andorra) V Jiménez Kasintseva	0	3
(Croatia) A Konjuh	7	6
(France) C Monnet	5	4
Alt	(Poland) W Falkowska	6	3	6
(Romania) J Cristian	4	6	3
(Uzbekistan) N Abduraimova	1	4
5	(Ukraine) D Yastremska	6	6

Second round
1/WC	(China) S Zhang	6	6
(United States) S Chang	4	4
(Sweden) R Peterson	6	6
7	(Ukraine) D Snigur	4	1
3	(Germany) T Maria	3	2
(Croatia) A Konjuh	6	6
Alt	(Poland) W Falkowska	6	5	6
5	(Ukraine) D Yastremska	4	7	3

Quarterfinals
1/WC	(China) S Zhang	7^{7}	2	1
(Sweden) R Peterson	6^{5}	6	6
(Croatia) A Konjuh	7	4	6
Alt	(Poland) W Falkowska	5	6	3

Semifinals
(Sweden) R Peterson	6	6
(Croatia) A Konjuh	3	1

=== Bottom half ===
First round
6	(Italy) S Errani	5	3
WC	(Germany) S Lisicki	7	6
WC	A Charaeva	6	6
(Switzerland) J Züger	1	4
(France) O Dodin	6	6^{6}	6
A Zakharova	3	7^{8}	2
(United States) A Parks	7^{7}	2	6
4	(Czech Republic) L Nosková	6^{5}	6	2
8	(Spain) C Bucșa	6	7^{7}
(Israel) L Glushko	1	6^{1}
(Turkey) P Özgen	6^{3}	3
(Ukraine) K Baindl	7^{7}	6
(France) J Ponchet	6^{4}	7^{9}	6^{6}
(United States) K Scott	7^{7}	6^{7}	7^{8}
SR	(Belgium) Y Wickmayer	4	4
2	(Belgium) A Van Uytvanck	6	6

Second round
WC	(Germany) S Lisicki	6	6
WC	A Charaeva	0	3
(France) O Dodin	3	6^{6}
(United States) A Parks	6	7^{8}
8	(Spain) C Bucșa	6	6
(Ukraine) K Baindl	3	3
(United States) K Scott	5	2
2	(Belgium) A Van Uytvanck	7	6

Quarterfinals
WC	(Germany) S Lisicki	6^{4}	6	3
(United States) A Parks	7^{7}	4	6
8	(Spain) C Bucșa	3	6	6
2	(Belgium) A Van Uytvanck	6	3	4

Semifinals
(United States) A Parks	6	6
8	(Spain) C Bucșa	3	3
