= 2023 BNP Paribas Open – Women's singles =

Tennis tournament event

Women's singles
- 2023 BNP Paribas Open

Final
- Champion: (Kazakhstan) Elena Rybakina
- Runner-up: Aryna Sabalenka
- Score: 7–6^{(13–11)}, 6–4

Details
- Draw: 96 (12 Q / 8 WC )
- Seeds: 32

Events
Singles	men	women
Doubles	men	women
← 2022 ·	Indian Wells Open	· 2024 →

Elena Rybakina defeated Aryna Sabalenka in the final, 7–6^{(13–11)}, 6–4 to win the women's singles tennis title at the 2023 Indian Wells Open. It was her first WTA 1000 title, becoming the first Kazakhstani to win a WTA 1000 singles title. The final was a rematch of the Australian Open final, won by Sabalenka.

Iga Świątek was the defending champion, but lost in the semifinals to Rybakina.

== Seeds ==
All seeds received a bye into the second round.

1. (Poland) Iga Świątek (semifinals)
2. Aryna Sabalenka (final)
3. (United States) Jessica Pegula (fourth round)
4. (Tunisia) Ons Jabeur (third round)
5. (France) Caroline Garcia (fourth round)
6. (United States) Coco Gauff (quarterfinals)
7. (Greece) Maria Sakkari (semifinals)
8. Daria Kasatkina (third round)
9. (Switzerland) Belinda Bencic (second round)
10. (Kazakhstan) Elena Rybakina (champion)
11. Veronika Kudermetova (third round)
12. Liudmila Samsonova (second round)
13. (Brazil) Beatriz Haddad Maia (third round)
14. Victoria Azarenka (second round)
15. (Czech Republic) Petra Kvitová (quarterfinals)
16. (Czech Republic) Barbora Krejčíková (fourth round)
17. (Czech Republic) Karolína Plíšková (fourth round)
18. Ekaterina Alexandrova (second round)
19. (United States) Madison Keys (second round, retired)
20. (Poland) Magda Linette (second round)
21. (Spain) Paula Badosa (third round)
22. (China) Zhang Shuai (second round, retired)
23. (Italy) Martina Trevisan (third round)
24. (Latvia) Jeļena Ostapenko (third round)
25. (Croatia) Petra Martić (second round)
26. Anastasia Potapova (third round)
27. (Ukraine) Anhelina Kalinina (third round)
28. (Czech Republic) Marie Bouzková (second round)
29. (Croatia) Donna Vekić (second round)
30. (Canada) Leylah Fernandez (third round)
31. (United States) Amanda Anisimova (second round)
32. (Canada) Bianca Andreescu (third round)

Click on the seed number of a player to go to their draw section.

== Draw ==
=== Key ===
- Q = Qualifier
- WC = Wild card
- LL = Lucky loser
- Alt = Alternate
- SE = Special exempt
- PR = Protected ranking
- ITF = ITF entry
- JE = Junior exempt
- w/o = Walkover
- r = Retired
- d = Defaulted
- SR = Special ranking

=== Finals ===
Quarterfinals
1	(Poland) Iga Świątek	6	6
(Romania) Sorana Cîrstea	2	3
PR	(Czech Republic) Karolína Muchová	6^{4}	6	4
10	(Kazakhstan) Elena Rybakina	7^{7}	2	6
7	(Greece) Maria Sakkari	4	7	6
15	(Czech Republic) Petra Kvitová	6	5	1
6	(United States) Coco Gauff	4	0
2	Aryna Sabalenka	6	6

Semifinals
1	(Poland) Iga Świątek	2	2
10	(Kazakhstan) Elena Rybakina	6	6
7	(Greece) Maria Sakkari	2	3
2	Aryna Sabalenka	6	6

Final
10	(Kazakhstan) Elena Rybakina	7^{13}	6
2	Aryna Sabalenka	6^{11}	4

=== Top half ===
==== Section 1 ====
First round
(United States) C Liu	7^{7}	6
LL	(Slovakia) AK Schmiedlová	6^{5}	3
Q	(Spain) R Masarova	6	4	4
WC	(United States) P Stearns	4	6	6
(Montenegro) D Kovinić	2	3
(United Kingdom) E Raducanu	6	6
(Czech Republic) K Siniaková	7	6
(Germany) J Niemeier	5	4

Second round
1	(Poland) I Świątek	6	6
(United States) C Liu	0	1
WC	(United States) P Stearns	6	4	3
32	(Canada) B Andreescu	4	6	6
20	(Poland) M Linette	6^{3}	2
(United Kingdom) E Raducanu	7^{7}	6
(Czech Republic) K Siniaková	7	6^{4}	3
13	(Brazil) B Haddad Maia	5	7^{7}	6

Third round
1	(Poland) I Świątek	6	7^{7}
32	(Canada) B Andreescu	3	6^{1}
(United Kingdom) E Raducanu	6	2	6
13	(Brazil) B Haddad Maia	1	6	4

Fourth round
1	(Poland) I Świątek	6	6
(United Kingdom) E Raducanu	3	1

==== Section 2 ====
First round
(United States) B Pera	7	4	6
(Italy) L Bronzetti	5	6	3
(Romania) S Cîrstea	6	6
Q	(Australia) K Birrell	3	2
WC	(United States) E Navarro	1	6	6
WC	(United States) C McNally	6	1	1
LL	(Hungary) D Gálfi	6	6
(United States) D Collins	4	4

Second round
12	L Samsonova	6	6^{8}	6^{6}
(United States) B Pera	2	7^{10}	7^{8}
(Romania) S Cîrstea	6	0
19	(United States) M Keys	1	0^{r}
30	(Canada) L Fernandez	6	6
WC	(United States) E Navarro	2	4
LL	(Hungary) D Gálfi	1	7^{7}	4
5	(France) C Garcia	6	6^{4}	6

Third round
(United States) B Pera	3	1
(Romania) S Cîrstea	6	6
30	(Canada) L Fernandez	4	7^{7}	1
5	(France) C Garcia	6	6^{5}	6

Fourth round
(Romania) S Cîrstea	6	4	7
5	(France) C Garcia	4	6	5

==== Section 3 ====
First round
(Belgium) M Zanevska	6	4	2
LL	(Poland) M Fręch	4	6	6
PR	(Czech Republic) M Vondroušová	6	6
(Canada) R Marino	2	2
Q	(Germany) L Siegemund	6^{5}	4
(United States) M Brengle	7^{7}	6
(Kazakhstan) Y Putintseva	3	6	4
PR	(Czech Republic) K Muchová	6	4	6

Second round
4	(Tunisia) O Jabeur	4	6	6
LL	(Poland) M Fręch	6	4	1
PR	(Czech Republic) M Vondroušová	6	6
28	(Czech Republic) M Bouzková	1	1
23	(Italy) M Trevisan	5	6	6
(United States) M Brengle	7	1	2
PR	(Czech Republic) K Muchová	7^{7}	6
14	V Azarenka	6^{1}	3

Third round
4	(Tunisia) O Jabeur	6^{5}	4
PR	(Czech Republic) M Vondroušová	7^{7}	6
23	(Italy) M Trevisan	4	6	4
PR	(Czech Republic) K Muchová	6	3	6

Fourth round
PR	(Czech Republic) M Vondroušová	4	7^{7}	4
PR	(Czech Republic) K Muchová	6	6^{2}	6

==== Section 4 ====
First round
(United States) S Stephens	4	1
WC	(United States) S Kenin	6	6
(Spain) N Párrizas Díaz	6	7
(Italy) E Cocciaretto	3	5
Q	(Belgium) Y Bonaventure	2	2
Q	V Gracheva	6	6
(Germany) T Maria	7	6
(Italy) J Paolini	5	1

Second round
10	(Kazakhstan) E Rybakina	7^{8}	7^{7}
WC	(United States) S Kenin	6^{6}	6^{5}
(Spain) N Párrizas Díaz	2	5
21	(Spain) P Badosa	6	7
25	(Croatia) P Martić	3	2
Q	V Gracheva	6	6
(Germany) T Maria	2	1
8	D Kasatkina	6	6

Third round
10	(Kazakhstan) E Rybakina	6	7
21	(Spain) P Badosa	3	5
Q	V Gracheva	6	6
8	D Kasatkina	4	4

Fourth round
10	(Kazakhstan) E Rybakina	6	6
Q	V Gracheva	3	0

=== Bottom half ===
==== Section 5 ====
First round
WC	(United States) K Volynets	4	6	1
(United States) S Rogers	6	4	6
(Egypt) M Sherif	6	2	3
(Czech Republic) L Fruhvirtová	0	6	6
A Kalinskaya	6	6
(United States) A Parks	1	1
WC	(United States) A Li	1	2
A Blinkova	6	6

Second round
7	(Greece) M Sakkari	2	6	6
(United States) S Rogers	6	4	0
(Czech Republic) L Fruhvirtová	6	4	5
27	(Ukraine) A Kalinina	4	6	7
17	(Czech Republic) Ka Plíšková	2	6	6
A Kalinskaya	6	0	4
A Blinkova	3	4
11	V Kudermetova	6	6

Third round
7	(Greece) M Sakkari	3	6	6
27	(Ukraine) A Kalinina	6	2	4
17	(Czech Republic) Ka Plíšková	6	7
11	V Kudermetova	1	5

Fourth round
7	(Greece) M Sakkari	6	5	6
17	(Czech Republic) Ka Plíšková	4	7	3

==== Section 6 ====
First round
WC	(United States) E Mandlik	6	5	7^{7}
(United States) A Riske-Amritraj	3	7	6^{1}
A Sasnovich	6	7^{7}
(Estonia) K Kanepi	3	6^{5}
Q	(Serbia) O Danilović	6	2	3
(China) Xiy Wang	4	6	6
Q	(Netherlands) A Rus	3	3
(Italy) C Giorgi	6	6

Second round
15	(Czech Republic) P Kvitová	6	7
WC	(United States) E Mandlik	1	5
A Sasnovich	5	6	2
24	(Latvia) J Ostapenko	7	3	6
26	A Potapova	4	7^{7}	6
(China) Xiy Wang	6	6^{4}	2
(Italy) C Giorgi	6	1	2
3	(United States) J Pegula	3	6	6

Third round
15	(Czech Republic) P Kvitová	0	6	6
24	(Latvia) J Ostapenko	6	0	4
26	A Potapova	6	4	5
3	(United States) J Pegula	3	6	7

Fourth round
15	(Czech Republic) P Kvitová	6	3	7^{13}
3	(United States) J Pegula	2	6	6^{11}

==== Section 7 ====
First round
Q	(United Kingdom) K Swan	6^{6}	5
Q	(Spain) C Bucșa	7^{8}	7
(Czech Republic) L Nosková	7^{9}	6
(Romania) I-C Begu	6^{7}	1
Q	(Sweden) R Peterson	7	5	7
(Ukraine) M Kostyuk	5	7	5
Q	(United States) A Krueger	1	4
(Switzerland) J Teichmann	6	6

Second round
6	(United States) C Gauff	6	6
Q	(Spain) C Bucșa	2	4
(Czech Republic) L Nosková	7^{8}	6
31	(United States) A Anisimova	6^{6}	3
22	(China) S Zhang	0^{r}
Q	(Sweden) R Peterson	3
(Switzerland) J Teichmann	3	6	6
9	(Switzerland) B Bencic	6	3	3

Third round
6	(United States) C Gauff	6	6
(Czech Republic) L Nosková	4	3
Q	(Sweden) R Peterson	3	6	6
(Switzerland) J Teichmann	6	3	1

Fourth round
6	(United States) C Gauff	6	1	6
Q	(Sweden) R Peterson	3	6	4

==== Section 8 ====
First round
WC	(Ukraine) D Yastremska	6	6
(Hungary) A Bondár	3	4
(China) Xin Wang	6	6
(Belgium) E Mertens	3	1
Q	(Ukraine) L Tsurenko	6	6
(China) L Zhu	4	3
PR	E Rodina	6	7
(France) A Cornet	2	5

Second round
16	(Czech Republic) B Krejčíková	6	6
WC	(Ukraine) D Yastremska	1	2
(China) Xin Wang	6	6
18	E Alexandrova	2	3
29	(Croatia) D Vekić	6	2	2
Q	(Ukraine) L Tsurenko	2	6	6
PR	E Rodina	2	0
2	A Sabalenka	6	6

Third round
16	(Czech Republic) B Krejčíková	6	6^{1}	6
(China) Xin Wang	2	7^{7}	2
Q	(Ukraine) L Tsurenko
2	A Sabalenka	w/o

Fourth round
16	(Czech Republic) B Krejčíková	3	6	4
2	A Sabalenka	6	2	6

== Seeded players ==
The following are the seeded players. Seedings are based on WTA rankings as of February 27, 2023. Rankings and points before are as of March 6, 2023.

Seed	Rank	Player	Points before	Points defending	Points earned	Points after	Status
1	1	(Poland) Iga Świątek	10,585	1,000	390	9,975	Semifinals lost to (Kazakhstan) Elena Rybakina [10]
2	2	Aryna Sabalenka	6,100	10	650	6,740	Runner-up, lost to (Kazakhstan) Elena Rybakina [10]
3	3	(United States) Jessica Pegula	5,495	10	120	5,605	Fourth round lost to (Czech Republic) Petra Kvitová [15]
4	4	(Tunisia) Ons Jabeur	4,921	10	65	4,976	Third round lost to (Czech Republic) Markéta Vondroušová [PR]
5	5	(France) Caroline Garcia	4,905	35	120	4,990	Fourth round lost to (Romania) Sorana Cîrstea
6	6	(United States) Coco Gauff	4,251	65	215	4,401	Quarterfinals lost to Aryna Sabalenka [2]
7	7	(Greece) Maria Sakkari	3,451	650	390	3,191	Semifinals lost to Aryna Sabalenka [2]
8	8	Daria Kasatkina	3,375	65	65	3,375	Third round lost to Varvara Gracheva [Q]
9	9	(Switzerland) Belinda Bencic	3,360	10	10	3,360	Second round lost to (Switzerland) Jil Teichmann
10	10	(Kazakhstan) Elena Rybakina	2,935	215	1,000	3,720	Champion, defeated Aryna Sabalenka [2]
11	11	Veronika Kudermetova	2,620	215	65	2,470	Third round lost to (Czech Republic) Karolína Plíšková [17]
12	12	Liudmila Samsonova	2,301	120	10	2,191	Second round lost to (United States) Bernarda Pera
13	13	(Brazil) Beatriz Haddad Maia	2,246	35	65	2,276	Third round lost to (United Kingdom) Emma Raducanu
14	14	Victoria Azarenka	2,237	65	10	2,182	Second round lost to (Czech Republic) Karolína Muchová [PR]
15	15	(Czech Republic) Petra Kvitová	2,227	65	215	2,377	Quarterfinals lost to (Greece) Maria Sakkari [7]
16	16	(Czech Republic) Barbora Krejčíková	2,205	(1)^{†}	120	2,324	Fourth round lost to Aryna Sabalenka [2]
17	17	(Czech Republic) Karolína Plíšková	2,045	10	120	2,155	Fourth round lost to (Greece) Maria Sakkari [7]
18	18	Ekaterina Alexandrova	2,030	35	10	2,005	Second round lost to (China) Wang Xinyu
19	20	(United States) Madison Keys	1,857	215	10	1,652	Second round retired against (Romania) Sorana Cîrstea
20	21	(Poland) Magda Linette	1,770	10	10	1,770	Second round lost to (United Kingdom) Emma Raducanu
21	22	(Spain) Paula Badosa	1,758	390	65	1,433	Third round lost to (Kazakhstan) Elena Rybakina [10]
22	27	(China) Zhang Shuai	1,460	10	10	1,460	Second round retired against (Sweden) Rebecca Peterson [Q]
23	26	(Italy) Martina Trevisan	1,529	(1)^{‡}	65	1,593	Third round lost to (Czech Republic) Karolína Muchová [PR]
24	25	(Latvia) Jeļena Ostapenko	1,550	10	65	1,605	Third round lost to (Czech Republic) Petra Kvitová [15]
25	30	(Croatia) Petra Martić	1,422	215	10	1,217	Second round lost to Varvara Gracheva [Q]
26	28	Anastasia Potapova	1,439	10	65	1,494	Third round lost to (United States) Jessica Pegula [3]
27	29	(Ukraine) Anhelina Kalinina	1,422	35	65	1,452	Third round lost to (Greece) Maria Sakkari [7]
28	32	(Czech Republic) Marie Bouzková	1,359	95	10	1,274	Second round lost to (Czech Republic) Markéta Vondroušová [PR]
29	23	(Croatia) Donna Vekić	1,664	(12)^{‡}	10	1,662	Second round lost to (Ukraine) Lesia Tsurenko [Q]
30	49	(Canada) Leylah Fernandez	1,080	120	65	1,025	Third round lost to (France) Caroline Garcia [5]
31	35	(United States) Amanda Anisimova	1,304	35	10	1,279	Second round lost to (Czech Republic) Linda Nosková
32	36	(Canada) Bianca Andreescu	1,303	(1)^{‡}	65	1,367	Third round lost to (Poland) Iga Świątek [1]

† The player was not required to count points for the 2022 tournament due to a long-term injury exception. Points from her 16th best result will be deducted instead.
‡ The player did not qualify for the tournament in 2022. Points from her 16th best result will be deducted instead.

=== Withdrawn players ===
The following player would have been seeded, but withdrew before the tournament began.

Rank	Player	Points before	Points dropped	Points after	Withdrawal reason
24	(China) Zheng Qinwen	1,629	35	1,594	

== Other entry information ==
=== Wildcards ===
- (United States) Sofia Kenin
- (United States) Ann Li
- (United States) Elizabeth Mandlik
- (United States) Caty McNally
- (United States) Emma Navarro
- (United States) Peyton Stearns
- (United States) Katie Volynets
- (Ukraine) Dayana Yastremska

=== Protected ranking ===
- (Czech Republic) Karolína Muchová
- Evgeniya Rodina
- (Czech Republic) Markéta Vondroušová

=== Withdrawals ===
Before the tournament

- (Romania) Ana Bogdan → replaced by (United Kingdom) Emma Raducanu
- (Romania) Jaqueline Cristian → replaced by (Slovakia) Anna Karolína Schmiedlová
- (United States) Lauren Davis → replaced by (Poland) Magdalena Fręch
- (Estonia) Anett Kontaveit → replaced by (Belgium) Maryna Zanevska
- (Colombia) Camila Osorio → replaced by (United States) Madison Brengle
- (Romania) Patricia Maria Țig → replaced by (Spain) Nuria Párrizas Díaz
- (China) Zheng Qinwen → replaced by (Hungary) Dalma Gálfi

== Qualifying ==
=== Seeds ===
1. (Hungary) Dalma Gálfi (qualifying competition, lucky loser)
2. (Spain) Cristina Bucșa (qualified)
3. Varvara Gracheva (qualified)
4. (Spain) Rebeka Masarova (qualified)
5. (Switzerland) Viktorija Golubic (first round)
6. Diana Shnaider (first round)
7. (Belgium) Ysaline Bonaventure (qualified)
8. Kamilla Rakhimova (first round)
9. (Ukraine) Lesia Tsurenko (qualified)
10. (Sweden) Rebecca Peterson (qualified)
11. (Slovakia) Anna Karolína Schmiedlová (qualifying competition, lucky loser)
12. (Brazil) Laura Pigossi (first round)
13. (Poland) Magdalena Fręch (qualifying competition, lucky loser)
14. (Italy) Sara Errani (qualifying competition)
15. (Germany) Anna-Lena Friedsam (qualifying competition)
16. (United Kingdom) Harriet Dart (first round)
17. (France) Léolia Jeanjean (first round)
18. (France) Diane Parry (first round)
19. (Czech Republic) Tereza Martincová (first round)
20. (Australia) Kimberly Birrell (qualified)
21. (Hungary) Réka Luca Jani (first round)
22. (Italy) Lucrezia Stefanini (first round)
23. (Germany) Eva Lys (qualifying competition)
24. (Germany) Laura Siegemund (qualified)

=== Qualifiers ===
1. (United Kingdom) Katie Swan
2. (Spain) Cristina Bucșa
3. Varvara Gracheva
4. (Spain) Rebeka Masarova
5. (Serbia) Olga Danilović
6. (Netherlands) Arantxa Rus
7. (Belgium) Ysaline Bonaventure
8. (Australia) Kimberly Birrell
9. (Ukraine) Lesia Tsurenko
10. (Sweden) Rebecca Peterson
11. (Germany) Laura Siegemund
12. (United States) Ashlyn Krueger

=== Lucky losers ===
1. (Hungary) Dalma Gálfi
2. (Slovakia) Anna Karolína Schmiedlová
3. (Poland) Magdalena Fręch

=== Qualifying draw ===
==== First qualifier ====
First round
1	(Hungary) Dalma Gálfi	6	6
(Croatia) Ana Konjuh	3	2
(United Kingdom) Katie Swan	6	6
17	(France) Léolia Jeanjean	2	1

Qualifying competition
1	(Hungary) Dalma Gálfi	4	6^{6}
(United Kingdom) Katie Swan	6	7^{8}

==== Second qualifier ====
First round
2	(Spain) Cristina Bucșa	6	7
Erika Andreeva	3	5
(Romania) Elena-Gabriela Ruse	6	6
19	(Czech Republic) Tereza Martincová	1	4

Qualifying competition
2	(Spain) Cristina Bucșa	7^{7}	6
(Romania) Elena-Gabriela Ruse	6^{3}	4

==== Third qualifier ====
First round
3	Varvara Gracheva	7^{7}	6
WC	(Croatia) Petra Marčinko	6^{2}	4
(Spain) Marina Bassols Ribera	1	0
15	(Germany) Anna-Lena Friedsam	6	6

Qualifying competition
3	Varvara Gracheva	7^{7}	6^{6}	6
15	(Germany) Anna-Lena Friedsam	6^{5}	7^{8}	4

==== Fourth qualifier ====
First round
4	(Spain) Rebeka Masarova	6	7
(Sweden) Mirjam Björklund	3	5
WC	(United States) Liv Hovde	6	6
21	(Hungary) Réka Luca Jani	3	2

Qualifying competition
4	(Spain) Rebeka Masarova	6	6
WC	(United States) Liv Hovde	2	2

==== Fifth qualifier ====
First round
5	(Switzerland) Viktorija Golubic	5	6	4
PR	(Serbia) Olga Danilović	7	1	6
(Slovenia) Kaja Juvan	7^{8}	2	6
22	(Italy) Lucrezia Stefanini	6^{6}	6	1

Qualifying competition
PR	(Serbia) Olga Danilović	7^{10}	5	6
(Slovenia) Kaja Juvan	6^{8}	7	3

==== Sixth qualifier ====
First round
6	Diana Shnaider	6^{0}	7	0
(Netherlands) Arantxa Rus	7^{7}	5	6
(Switzerland) Ylena In-Albon	4	2
14	(Italy) Sara Errani	6	6

Qualifying competition
(Netherlands) Arantxa Rus	7^{7}	6
14	(Italy) Sara Errani	6^{1}	3

==== Seventh qualifier ====
First round
7	(Belgium) Ysaline Bonaventure	7^{7}	6
(Slovakia) Viktória Kužmová	6^{4}	3
PR	(Ukraine) Katarina Zavatska	2	6^{2}
23	(Germany) Eva Lys	6	7^{7}

Qualifying competition
7	(Belgium) Ysaline Bonaventure	6	7^{7}
23	(Germany) Eva Lys	4	6^{4}

==== Eighth qualifier ====
First round
8	Kamilla Rakhimova	6	3	5
(Japan) Nao Hibino	4	6	7
(United Kingdom) Jodie Burrage	2	4
20	(Australia) Kimberly Birrell	6	6

Qualifying competition
(Japan) Nao Hibino	1	6	3
20	(Australia) Kimberly Birrell	6	2	6

==== Ninth qualifier ====
First round
9	(Ukraine) Lesia Tsurenko	6^{5}	6	6
(United States) Taylor Townsend	7^{7}	1	1
(United Kingdom) Katie Boulter	6	6
18	(France) Diane Parry	4	2

Qualifying competition
9	(Ukraine) Lesia Tsurenko	6	6^{4}	6
(United Kingdom) Katie Boulter	3	7^{7}	4

==== Tenth qualifier ====
First round
10	(Sweden) Rebecca Peterson	6	6
(Switzerland) Simona Waltert	3	1
WC	(United States) Caroline Dolehide	6	6
16	(United Kingdom) Harriet Dart	1	2

Qualifying competition
10	(Sweden) Rebecca Peterson	7	7^{7}
WC	(United States) Caroline Dolehide	5	6^{2}

==== Eleventh qualifier ====
First round
11	(Slovakia) Anna Karolína Schmiedlová	6	6
WC	(United States) Stephanie Yakoff	1	0
(United States) CoCo Vandeweghe	6^{3}	3
24	(Germany) Laura Siegemund	7^{7}	6

Qualifying competition
11	(Slovakia) Anna Karolína Schmiedlová	4	6	2
24	(Germany) Laura Siegemund	6	4	6

==== Twelfth qualifier ====
First round
12	(Brazil) Laura Pigossi	4	4
WC	(United States) Ashlyn Krueger	6	6
WC	(United States) Robin Montgomery	6^{4}	3
13	(Poland) Magdalena Fręch	7^{7}	6

Qualifying competition
WC	(United States) Ashlyn Krueger	6	6
13	(Poland) Magdalena Fręch	2	0
