= Marina Bassols Ribera =

Spanish tennis player (born 1999)

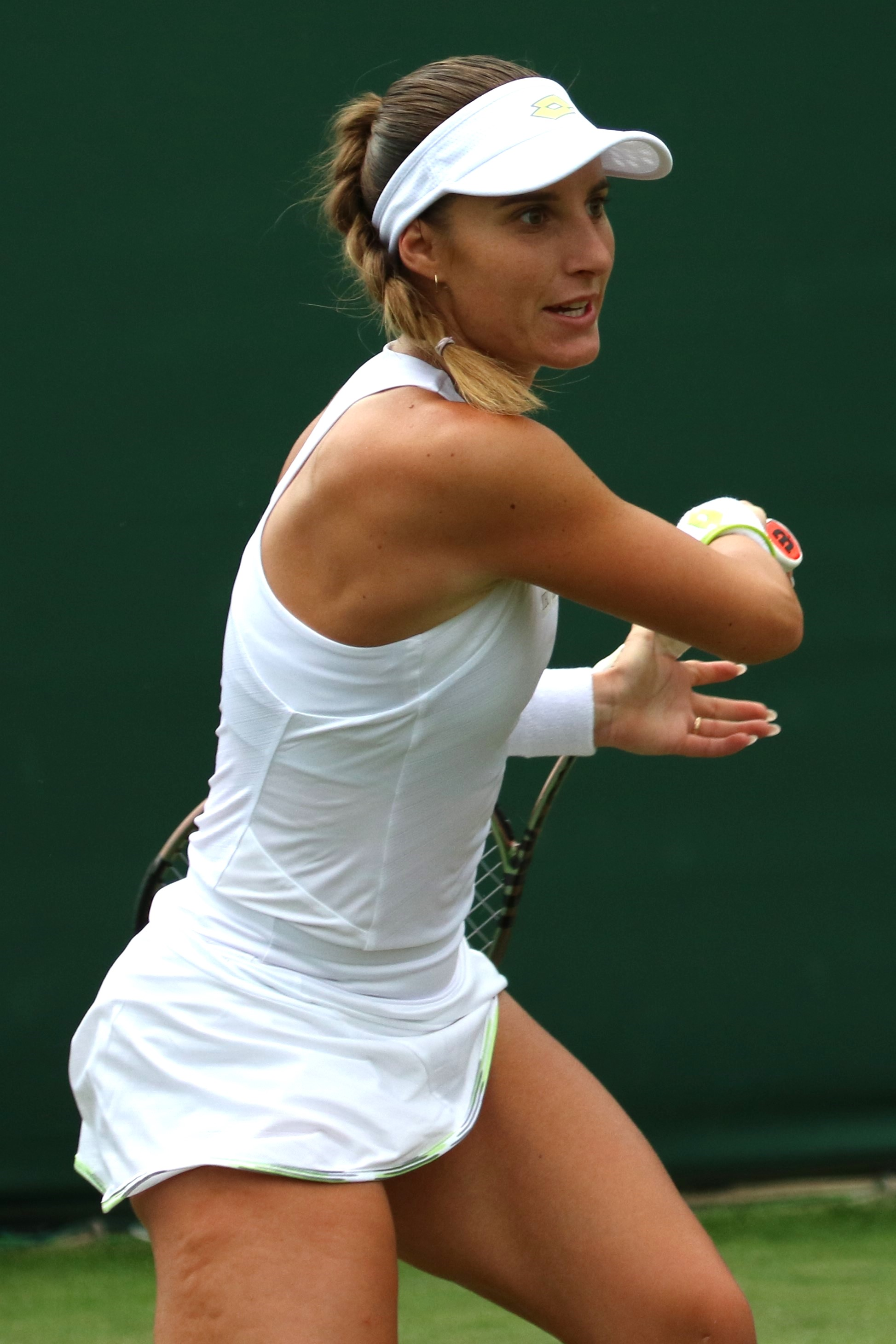
- Bassols Ribera at the 2023 Wimbledon Championships
- Country (sports): Spain
- Born: 13 December 1999 (age 26) Blanes, Girona, Spain
- Height: 1.65 m (5 ft 5 in)
- Plays: Right-handed
- Prize money: $1,195,942

Singles
- Career record: 382–261
- Career titles: 2 WTA 125, 9 ITF
- Highest ranking: No. 105 (5 February 2024)
- Current ranking: No. 125 (26 October 2026)

Grand Slam singles results
- Australian Open: Q3 (2026)
- French Open: 2R (2026)
- Wimbledon: Q3 (2023, 2026)
- US Open: 1R (2024)

Doubles
- Career record: 125–111
- Career titles: 7 ITF
- Highest ranking: No. 194 (15 August 2022)
- Current ranking: No. 532 (26 October 2026)
Medal record
Representing Spain
Mediterranean Games
Bronze medal – third place	2018 Tarragona	Doubles
- Last updated on: 27 October 2026.

Marina Bassols Ribera (born 13 December 1999) is a Spanish tennis player. She has career-high WTA rankings of No. 105 in singles, achieved on 5 February 2024, and of No. 194 in doubles, reached in 2022.

== Career ==
Bassols Ribera made her WTA Tour main-draw debut at the 2021 Palermo Ladies Open, losing to Jil Teichmann in the first round.

She entered the 2023 Monterrey Open as a lucky loser, but was eliminated in the first round by eighth seed Elisabetta Cocciaretto. Bassols Ribera won her first WTA 125 title at the 2023 Ljubljana Open defeating Zeynep Sönmez in the final, in straight sets. She claimed her second WTA 125 title at the Andorrà Open defeating Erika Andreeva, also in straight sets.

Bassols Ribera entered the 2024 Transylvania Open, a WTA 250 tournament, as a lucky loser, but went out in the first round to Jaqueline Cristian.

Ranked No. 115, she made her major debut at the 2024 US Open after qualifying and lost in the first round to eighth seed Barbora Krejčíková.

== Performance timeline ==
Key
W	F	SF	QF	#R	RR	Q#	P#	DNQ	A	Z#	PO	G	S	B	NMS	NTI	P	NH

(W) winner; (F) finalist; (SF) semifinalist; (QF) quarterfinalist; (#R) rounds 4, 3, 2, 1; (RR) round-robin stage; (Q#) qualification round; (P#) preliminary round; (DNQ) did not qualify; (A) absent; (Z#) Davis/Fed Cup Zonal Group (with number indication) or (PO) play-off; (G) gold, (S) silver or (B) bronze Olympic/Paralympic medal; (NMS) not a Masters tournament; (NTI) not a Tier I tournament; (P) postponed; (NH) not held; (SR) strike rate (events won / competed); (W–L) win–loss record.
To avoid confusion and double counting, these charts are updated at the conclusion of a tournament or when the player's participation has ended.

=== Singles ===
Current through the 2023 US Open.

Tournament	2021	2022	2023	SR	W–L
Grand Slam tournaments
Australian Open	A	A	Q2	0 / 0	0–0
French Open	A	A	Q1	0 / 0	0–0
Wimbledon	A	A	Q3	0 / 0	0–0
US Open	A	Q2	Q3	0 / 0	0–0
Win–Loss	0–0	0–0	0–0	0 / 0	0–0
WTA 1000 tournaments
Indian Wells Open	A	A	Q1	0 / 0	0–0
Miami Open	A	A	Q1	0 / 0	0–0
Madrid Open	A	A	1R	0 / 1	0–1
Italian Open	A	A	Q2	0 / 0	0–0
Career statistics
Tournaments	1	3	5	Career total: 9	
Overall win-loss	0–1	0–3	0–5	0 / 9	0–9
Year-end ranking	292	159	110	$233,952	

== WTA 125 finals ==
=== Singles: 4 (2 titles, 2 runner-ups) ===
Result	W–L	Date	Tournament	Surface	Opponent	Score
Loss	0–1	Jun 2023	Internacional de Valencia, Spain	Clay	(Egypt) Mayar Sherif	3–6, 3–6
Win	1–1	Sep 2023	Ljubljana Open, Slovenia	Clay	(Turkey) Zeynep Sönmez	6–0, 7–6^{(2)}
Win	2–1	Dec 2023	Andorrà Open, Andorra	Hard (i)	Erika Andreeva	7–5, 7–6^{(3)}
Loss	2–2	Apr 2026	Open Villa de Madrid, Spain	Clay	(Italy) Lisa Pigato	4–6, 0–6

=== Doubles: 1 (runner-up) ===
Result	Date	Tournament	Surface	Partner	Opponents	Score
Loss	Nov 2021	Montevideo Open, Uruguay	Clay	(Brazil) Carolina Alves	(Romania) Irina Bara (Georgia (country)) Ekaterine Gorgodze	4–6, 3–6

== ITF Circuit finals ==
=== Singles: 16 (9 titles, 7 runner-ups) ===
Legend W80 tournaments (1–0) W60 tournaments (1–1) W50 tournaments (0–2) W25/35 tournaments (2–2) W15 tournaments (5–2)	Finals by surface Hard (4–4) Clay (5–3)

Result	W–L	Date	Tournament	Tier	Surface	Opponent	Score
Loss	0–1	Sep 2017	ITF Melilla, Spain	W15	Clay	(Spain) Eva Guerrero Álvarez	4–6, 0–6
Win	1–1	Feb 2018	ITF Manacor, Spain	W15	Clay	(Russia) Marta Paigina	6–1, 6–4
Loss	1–2	Feb 2018	ITF Palmanova, Spain	W15	Clay	(Australia) Seone Mendez	7–6^{(3)}, 1–6, 2–6
Win	2–2	Aug 2018	ITF Rotterdam, Netherlands	W15	Clay	(Belarus) Sviatlana Pirazhenka	7–5, 6–2
Win	3–2	Aug 2018	ITF Haren, Netherlands	W15	Clay	(Belgium) Lara Salden	6–2, 7–6^{(4)}
Win	4–2	Jan 2019	ITF Manacor, Spain	W15	Clay	(Romania) Ioana Loredana Roșca	6–3, 6–4
Loss	4–3	Sep 2019	ITF Marbella, Spain	W25	Clay	(Netherlands) Arantxa Rus	2–6, 2–6
Loss	4–4	Mar 2021	ITF Manacor, Spain	W25	Hard	(Spain) Nuria Párrizas Díaz	2–6, 1–6
Win	5–4	Mar 2021	ITF Manacor, Spain	W15	Hard	(Italy) Camilla Rosatello	7–5, 6–2
Win	6–4	Jun 2022	ITF Madrid Open, Spain	W60	Hard	(Philippines) Alex Eala	6–4, 7–5
Win	7–4	Jul 2022	ITF Palma del Río, Spain	W25+H	Hard	(France) Jessika Ponchet	5–7, 6–4, 6–3
Loss	7–5	Sep 2022	Caldas da Rainha Open, Portugal	W60+H	Hard	(Italy) Lucrezia Stefanini	6–3, 1–6, 6–7
Win	8–5	Nov 2022	Open de Valencia, Spain	W80+H	Clay	(Switzerland) Ylena In-Albon	6–4, 6–0
Loss	8–6	Sep 2025	ITF Baza, Spain	W50	Hard	(Spain) Eva Guerrero Álvarez	6–7^{(1)}, 5–7
Win	9–6	Nov 2025	ITF Faro, Portugal	W35	Hard	(Netherlands) Britt du Pree	1–6, 6–2, 6–1
Loss	9–7	Jan 2026	ITF Monastir, Tunisia	W50	Hard	(China) Shi Han	6–4, 2–6, 4–6

=== Doubles: 14 (7 titles, 7 runner-ups) ===
Legend W100 tournaments (0–1) W60 tournaments (0–1) W25 tournaments (5–3) W15 tournaments (2–2)	Finals by surface Hard (4–1) Clay (2–6) Carpet (1–0)

Result	W–L	Date	Tournament	Tier	Surface	Partner	Opponents	Score
Loss	0–1	Sep 2017	ITF Madrid, Spain	W15	Hard	(Spain) Júlia Payola	(United Kingdom) Alicia Barnett (United Kingdom) Olivia Nicholls	1–6, 2–6
Loss	0–2	Jul 2018	ITF Getxo, Spain	W25	Clay	(Spain) Guiomar Maristany	(Spain) Yvonne Cavallé Reimers (Spain) Ángela Fita Boluda	3–6, 2–6
Win	1–2	Jul 2018	ITF Don Benito, Spain	W15	Clay	(Germany) Irina Cantos Siemers	(Spain) Noelia Bouzó Zanotti (Spain) Ángela Fita Boluda	6–1, 6–2
Win	2–2	Jul 2018	ITF El Espinar, Spain	W25	Hard	(Spain) Olga Parres Azcoitia	(Serbia) Tamara Čurović (Turkey) Başak Eraydın	7–5, 6–4
Loss	2–3	Oct 2018	ITF Riba-roja de Túria, Spain	W25	Clay	(Spain) Ángela Fita Boluda	(Spain) Aliona Bolsova (Greece) Despina Papamichail	2–6, 2–6
Loss	2–4	Nov 2018	ITF Nules, Spain	W15	Clay	(Spain) Júlia Payola	(Spain) Cristina Bucșa (Spain) Claudia Hoste Ferrer	6–7^{(3)}, 3–6
Loss	2–5	Jun 2019	Trofeu de Barcelona, Spain	W60	Clay	(Spain) Yvonne Cavallé Reimers	(Japan) Kyōka Okamura (Japan) Moyuka Uchijima	6–7^{(7)}, 4–6
Win	3–5	Jul 2019	ITF El Espinar, Spain	W25	Hard	(China) Feng Shuo	(Australia) Alexandra Bozovic (Belarus) Shalimar Talbi	7–5, 7–6^{(4)}
Loss	3–6	Aug 2019	ITF Las Palmas, Spain	W25	Clay	(China) Feng Shuo	(Mexico) Victoria Rodríguez (Mexico) Ana Sofía Sánchez	3–6, 5–7
Win	4–6	Aug 2019	ITF Las Palmas, Spain	W25	Clay	(China) Feng Shuo	(France) Manon Arcangioli (Belgium) Kimberley Zimmermann	6–3, 6–1
Win	5–6	Sep 2020	ITF Montemor-o-Novo, Portugal	W25	Hard	(Romania) Ioana Loredana Roșca	(United Kingdom) Jodie Burrage (United Kingdom) Olivia Nicholls	7–6^{(5)}, 4–6, [10–6]
Win	6–6	Sep 2020	ITF Porto, Portugal	W15	Hard	(Brazil) Carolina Alves	(Spain) Júlia Payola (Japan) Himeno Sakatsume	6–1, 4–6, [10–7]
Win	7–6	May 2022	ITF Tossa de Mar, Spain	W25	Carpet	(Romania) Ioana Loredana Roșca	(Spain) Yvonne Cavallé Reimers (Spain) Celia Cerviño Ruiz	7–5, 6–0
Loss	7–7	Apr 2025	Open Villa de Madrid, Spain	W100	Clay	(Spain) Andrea Lázaro García	(Italy) Nicole Fossa Huergo (Kazakhstan) Zhibek Kulambayeva	6–7^{(7)}, 7–6^{(4)}, [7–10]
