= Erika Andreeva =

Russian tennis player (born 2004)

- Andreeva at the 2026 Wimbledon Championships
- Country (sports): Russia
- Born: 24 June 2004 (age 22) Krasnoyarsk, Russia
- Height: 168 cm (5 ft 6 in)
- Plays: Right (two-handed backhand)
- Coach: Eleni Kordolaimi
- Prize money: US$ 1,492,676

Singles
- Career record: 221–143
- Career titles: 5 ITF
- Highest ranking: No. 65 (21 October 2024)
- Current ranking: No. 215 (31 August 2026)

Grand Slam singles results
- Australian Open: 2R (2025)
- French Open: 1R (2023, 2024, 2025)
- Wimbledon: 2R (2024)
- US Open: 2R (2024)

Doubles
- Career record: 18–19
- Career titles: 1 WTA Challenger
- Highest ranking: No. 274 (11 December 2023)
- Current ranking: No. 1,116 (31 August 2026)
- Last updated on: 8 September 2026.

Erika Aleksandrovna Andreeva (Russian: Эрика Александровна Андреева, IPA: [ˈɛrʲɪkɐ‿ɐlʲɪkˈsandrəvnɐ‿ɐnˈdrʲe(j)ɪvə], born 24 June 2004) is a Russian tennis player. She has a career-high singles ranking of world No. 65, reached on 21 October 2024. She also has a best doubles ranking of No. 274, achieved on 11 December 2023. Andreeva has won one doubles title on the WTA Challenger Tour, as well as five singles titles and one doubles title on the ITF Circuit.

== Juniors ==
Andreeva finished runner-up at the 2021 French Open in the girls' singles event to Linda Nosková.

== Career ==
=== 2020–21: First ITF Circuit title ===
In November 2020, Andreeva won her first ITF Circuit title at the 15k event in Pazardzhik, Bulgaria. A month later, she won another ITF title, this time in Cairo, Egypt.

In March 2021, she won her third 15k tournament.

=== 2022: WTA Tour & major debuts ===
In May 2022, she lost her first significant final on the ITF Circuit, at the $100k Solgironès Open, after winning the first set.

Andreeva made her WTA Tour debut at the Ladies Open Lausanne. After qualifying, she recorded her first WTA Tour-level win in the first round, dropping only three games against Anna Blinkova.

She made her major debut at the 2022 US Open, winning her three qualifying matches to earn a spot in the main draw where she lost in the first round to Petra Kvitová.

=== 2023: WTA 1000 debut and first win ===
Ranked No. 135 at the inaugural ATX Open in Austin, Texas, she reached the main draw as lucky loser and defeated Harriet Dart in the longest match of the season thus far, lasting three hours and 32 minutes. Next, she lost to Anna-Lena Friedsam in another match that lasted more than three hours.

She received a wildcard for the main draw on her WTA 1000 debut at the Miami Open, defeating fellow wildcard Ashlyn Krueger in the first round before losing to Magdalena Fręch.

Andreeva got into main draw at the French Open as a lucky loser but went out in the first round to Emma Navarro.

=== 2024: Top 100, first major match win ===
Andreeva entered the top 100, after reaching the second round of the Qatar Ladies Open as a qualifier. She also qualified for the WTA 1000 Indian Wells Open but lost to Danielle Collins, in straight sets. She received a wildcard for the main draw at the Miami Open where she lost to Elina Avanesyan.

Andreeva lost in the final round of qualifying at Wimbledon but was given a place in the main draw as a lucky loser, going on to beat Emina Bektas in the first round for her first win at a major, before losing her next match to Donna Vekić. At the US Open, she defeated Yuan Yue in the first round, before losing to seventh seed Zheng Qinwen.

Partnering Séléna Janicijevic, Andreeva reached the doubles final at the WTA 125 Open de Limoges, losing to Elsa Jacquemot and Margaux Rouvroy.

== Personal life ==
Erika is the older sister of fellow professional tennis player Mirra Andreeva. They are both from Krasnoyarsk, but moved to Moscow for coaching. She graduated from the local children's music school, in the classical guitar department.

== Performance timeline ==
Key
W	F	SF	QF	#R	RR	Q#	P#	DNQ	A	Z#	PO	G	S	B	NMS	NTI	P	NH

(W) winner; (F) finalist; (SF) semifinalist; (QF) quarterfinalist; (#R) rounds 4, 3, 2, 1; (RR) round-robin stage; (Q#) qualification round; (P#) preliminary round; (DNQ) did not qualify; (A) absent; (Z#) Davis/Fed Cup Zonal Group (with number indication) or (PO) play-off; (G) gold, (S) silver or (B) bronze Olympic/Paralympic medal; (NMS) not a Masters tournament; (NTI) not a Tier I tournament; (P) postponed; (NH) not held; (SR) strike rate (events won / competed); (W–L) win–loss record.
To avoid confusion and double counting, these charts are updated at the conclusion of a tournament or when the player's participation has ended.

Only main-draw results in WTA Tour, Grand Slam tournaments, Billie Jean King Cup and Olympic Games are included in win–loss records.

=== Singles ===
Current through the 2025 US Open.

Tournament	2022	2023	2024	2025	2026	SR	W–L	Win %
Grand Slam tournaments
Australian Open	A	Q3	Q2	2R	A	0 / 1	1–1	50%
French Open	A	1R	1R	1R	A	0 / 3	0–3	0%
Wimbledon	A	Q2	2R	Q1	Q2	0 / 1	1–1	50%
US Open	1R	Q3	2R	A	Q1	0 / 2	1–2	33%
Win–loss	0–1	0–1	2–3	1–2	0–0	0 / 7	3–7	30%
WTA 1000 tournaments
Qatar Open	A	NTI	2R	Q2	A	0 / 1	1–1	50%
Dubai Championships	NTI	A	Q1	Q2	A	0 / 0	0–0	–
Indian Wells Open	A	Q1	1R	A	A	0 / 1	0–1	0%
Miami Open	A	2R	1R	1R	Q1	0 / 3	1–3	25%
Madrid Open	Q1	Q1	A	Q1	A	0 / 0	0–0	–
Italian Open	A	Q1	Q1	Q1	A	0 / 0	0–0	–
Canadian Open	A	A	1R	A	A	0 / 1	0–1	0%
Cincinnati Open	A	A	Q2	A	A	0 / 0	0–0	–
Wuhan Open	NH		3R	A		0 / 1	2–1	67%
China Open	NH	A	1R	A		0 / 1	0–1	0%
Guadalajara Open	A	A	NTI	A		0 / 0	0–0	–
Career statistics
	2022	2023	2024	2025	2026	SR	W–L	Win %
Tournaments	3	7	9	1		Career total: 17		
Titles	0	0	0	0		Career total: 0		
Finals	0	0	0	0		Career total: 0		
Hard win–loss	0–1	4–4	4–7	0–1		0 / 12	8–12	40%
Clay win–loss	1–2	1–3	0–2	0–0		0 / 7	2–7	22%
Overall win–loss	1–3	5–7	4–9	0–1		0 / 19	10–19	34%
Win %	25%	42%	31%			Career total: 34%		
Year-end ranking	122	142	67	264		$612,928		

== WTA 125 finals ==
=== Singles: 2 (2 runner-ups) ===
Result	W–L	Date	Tournament	Surface	Opponent	Score
Loss	0–1	Oct 2023	Open de Rouen, France	Hard (i)	(Switzerland) Viktorija Golubic	4–6, 1–6
Loss	0–2	Dec 2023	Andorrà Open, Andorra	Hard (i)	(Spain) Marina Bassols Ribera	5–7, 6–7^{(3–7)}

=== Doubles: 1 (title) ===
Result	W–L	Date	Tournament	Surface	Partner	Opponents	Score
Win	1–0	Dec 2023	Andorrà Open, Andorra	Hard (i)	(Switzerland) Céline Naef	(Hungary) Tímea Babos (United Kingdom) Heather Watson	6–2, 6–1

== ITF Circuit finals ==
=== Singles: 8 (5 titles, 3 runner-ups) ===
Legend
W100 tournaments (0–1)
W75 tournaments (2–0)
W25 tournaments (0–2)
W15 tournaments (3–0)

Result	W–L	Date	Tournament	Tier	Surface	Opponent	Score
Win	1–0	Nov 2020	ITF Pazardzhik, Bulgaria	W15	Clay	(Slovakia) Sofia Milátová	1–6, 6–0, 6–2
Win	2–0	Dec 2020	ITF Cairo, Egypt	W15	Clay	(Brazil) Carolina Alves	6–1, 6–3
Win	3–0	Mar 2021	ITF Sharm El Sheikh, Egypt	W15	Hard	(Switzerland) Jenny Dürst	1–6, 7–6^{(3)}, 6–0
Loss	3–1	Aug 2021	Verbier Open, Switzerland	W25	Clay	(Switzerland) Ylena In-Albon	1–6, 4–6
Loss	3–2	Dec 2021	ITF Selva Gardena, Italy	W25	Hard	(China) Yuan Yue	2–6, 6–7^{(4)}
Loss	3–3	May 2022	Solgironès Open, Spain	W100	Clay	(China) Wang Xinyu	6–3, 6–7^{(0)}, 0–6
Win	4–3	Oct 2025	Hamburg Ladies Cup, Germany	W75	Hard (i)	(Spain) Kaitlin Quevedo	6–4, 6–2
Win	5–3	May 2026	Zagreb Open, Croatia	W75	Clay	(Germany) Ella Seidel	6–3, 3–6, 6–3

=== Doubles: 2 (1 title, 1 runner-up) ===
Legend
$25,000 tournaments (1–1)

Result	W–L	Date	Tournament	Tier	Surface	Partner	Opponents	Score
Win	1–0	Aug 2021	Verbier Open, Switzerland	W25	Clay	(Russia) Ekaterina Makarova	(Latvia) Diāna Marcinkēviča (Russia) Maria Timofeeva	7–6, 6–1
Loss	1–1	Sep 2021	ITF Vienna, Austria	W25	Clay	(Russia) Ekaterina Kazionova	(Brazil) Carolina Alves (Poland) Martyna Kubka	7–6, 4–6, [7–10]

== Junior Grand Slam tournament finals ==
=== Singles: 1 (runner-up) ===
Result	Year	Tournament	Surface	Opponent	Score
Loss	2021	French Open	Clay	(Czech Republic) Linda Nosková	6–7^{(3–7)}, 3–6
