= Andorrà Open =

WTA 125K series
- Event name: Andorrà Open
- Tour: WTA Tour
- Founded: 2001
- Location: Andorra la Vella; Andorra
- Category: WTA 125
- Surface: Hard - indoor
- Draw: 32S / 8D
- Prize money: US$115,000 (2023)
- Website: andorraopenwta.com

Current champions (2023)
- Women's singles: (Spain) Marina Bassols Ribera
- Women's doubles: Erika Andreeva (Switzerland) Céline Naef

The Andorrà Open is a WTA 125-level professional women's tennis tournament. It takes place on indoor hard courts, in the months of November-December at the Poliesportiu d'Andorra in the city of Andorra la Vella in the principality of Andorra. The prize money is $115,000, making it the biggest ever tennis tournament to have been held in Andorra. Prior to this event, an ATP Challenger tournament was held on outdoor hard courts at the Complex Esportiu Prat del Roure in Escaldes–Engordany between 2001 and 2004 (an indoor hard challenger also took place from 1993 to 1999 at Pavelló de l'Aldosa).

== Results ==
=== Men's singles ===
Year	Champion	Runner-up	Score
2001	(Israel) Noam Okun	(Germany) Christian Vinck	6–2, 6–4
2002	(Belgium) Dick Norman	(Croatia) Ivo Karlović	6–4, 6–4
2003	(France) Grégory Carraz	(Chinese Taipei) Jimmy Wang	6–2, 6–3
2004	(United States) Kevin Kim	(Luxembourg) Gilles Müller	6–4, 6–0

=== Women's singles ===
Year	Champion	Runner-up	Score
2022	(United States) Alycia Parks	(Sweden) Rebecca Peterson	6–1, 6–4
2023	(Spain) Marina Bassols Ribera	Erika Andreeva	7–5, 7–6^{(7–3)}

=== Men's doubles ===
Year	Champion	Runner-up	Score
2001	(Russia) Denis Golovanov (Finland) Tuomas Ketola	(Spain) Julián Alonso (Spain) Jairo Velasco	6–3, 6–4
2002	(South Africa) Wesley Moodie (South Africa) Shaun Rudman	(Chile) Hermes Gamonal (Brazil) Ricardo Mello	6–2, 6–1
2003	(South Africa) Rik de Voest (Finland) Tuomas Ketola (2)	(Brazil) Ricardo Mello (Brazil) Alexandre Simoni	6–4, 3–6, 6–4
2004	(Luxembourg) Gilles Müller (Pakistan) Aisam-ul-Haq Qureshi	(Mexico) Santiago González (Mexico) Alejandro Hernández	6–3, 7–5

=== Women's doubles ===
Year	Champion	Runner-up	Score
2022	(Spain) Cristina Bucșa (Poland) Weronika Falkowska	Angelina Gabueva; Anastasia Zakharova	7–6^{(7–4)}, 6–1
2023	Erika Andreeva (Switzerland) Céline Naef	(Hungary) Tímea Babos (United Kingdom) Heather Watson	6–2, 6–1

== See also ==
- WTA 125 tournaments
