= Céline Naef =

Swiss tennis player (born 2005)

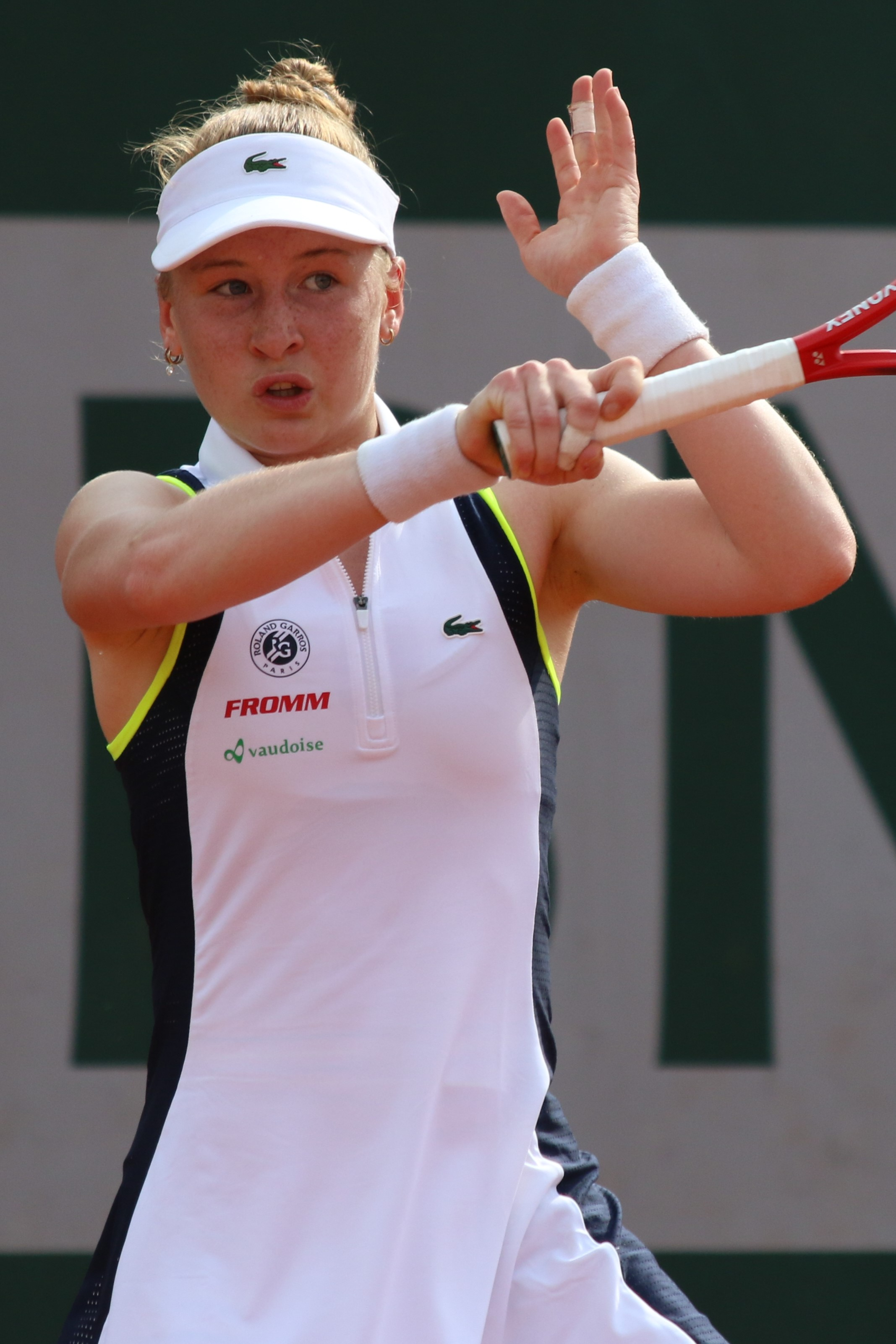
- Naef at the 2023 French Open
- Country (sports): Switzerland
- Born: 25 June 2005 (age 21) Bülach, Switzerland
- Height: 1.67 m (5 ft 6 in)
- Plays: Right (two-handed backhand)
- Prize money: $656,893

Singles
- Career record: 158–88
- Career titles: 10 ITF
- Highest ranking: No. 121 (16 October 2023)
- Current ranking: No. 219 (28 September 2026)

Grand Slam singles results
- Australian Open: Q2 (2024)
- French Open: Q1 (2023, 2024, 2025, 2026)
- Wimbledon: 1R (2023)
- US Open: Q2 (2023, 2024)

Doubles
- Career record: 60–34
- Career titles: 1 WTA Challenger, 7 ITF
- Highest ranking: No. 122 (18 November 2024)
- Current ranking: No. 424 (28 September 2026)

Team competitions
- Hopman Cup: F (2023)
- Last updated on: 5 October 2026.

Céline Naef (born 25 June 2005) is a Swiss tennis player. She has career-high WTA rankings of No. 121 in singles, achieved on 16 October 2023, and No. 122 in doubles, reached on 18 November 2024. Naef has won one doubles title on the WTA Challenger Tour along with ten singles and seven doubles titles on the ITF Circuit.

== Career ==
=== Junior years ===
Naef had a successful junior career. Her career-high ranking as a junior was world No. 4. In 2022, Naef won a prestigious tournament for juniors, the Trofeo Bonfiglio (Grade A). In 2022, Naef reached the final of the French Open, partnering Nikola Bartůňková. In July 2022, she played in the final of the European Youth Championship held in Klosters, Switzerland which she lost to Victoria Jiménez Kasintseva.

=== 2022: ITF Circuit titles ===
Naef played and won her first final in Monastir, Tunisia, in March 2022. In October 2022, she became champion in both singles and doubles in Reims, France. A week later, she won another singles title in Cherbourg-en-Cotentin defeating Spanish player Irene Burillo Escorihuela in the final.

=== 2023: WTA Tour debut, major and top 125 debuts ===
Naef started the season with a title in Loughborough, England where she became the champion by defeating British Eliz Maloney in the final. In February, Naef played her first $40k tournament finals, and became the champion in both singles and doubles in Porto, Portugal.

The 17 years old made her WTA Tour debut as a wildcard entrant at the 2023 Rosmalen Open in 's-Hertogenbosch, Netherlands and recorded her first tour-level win at the grass court event, defeating wildcard Venus Williams. Next, she defeated eighth seed Caty McNally, before losing to top seed Veronika Kudermetova in the quarterfinals. She made her Grand Slam tournament debut at Wimbledon after qualifying but lost in the first round to 22nd seed Anastasia Potapova.

=== 2024: WTA 125 singles and doubles finals ===
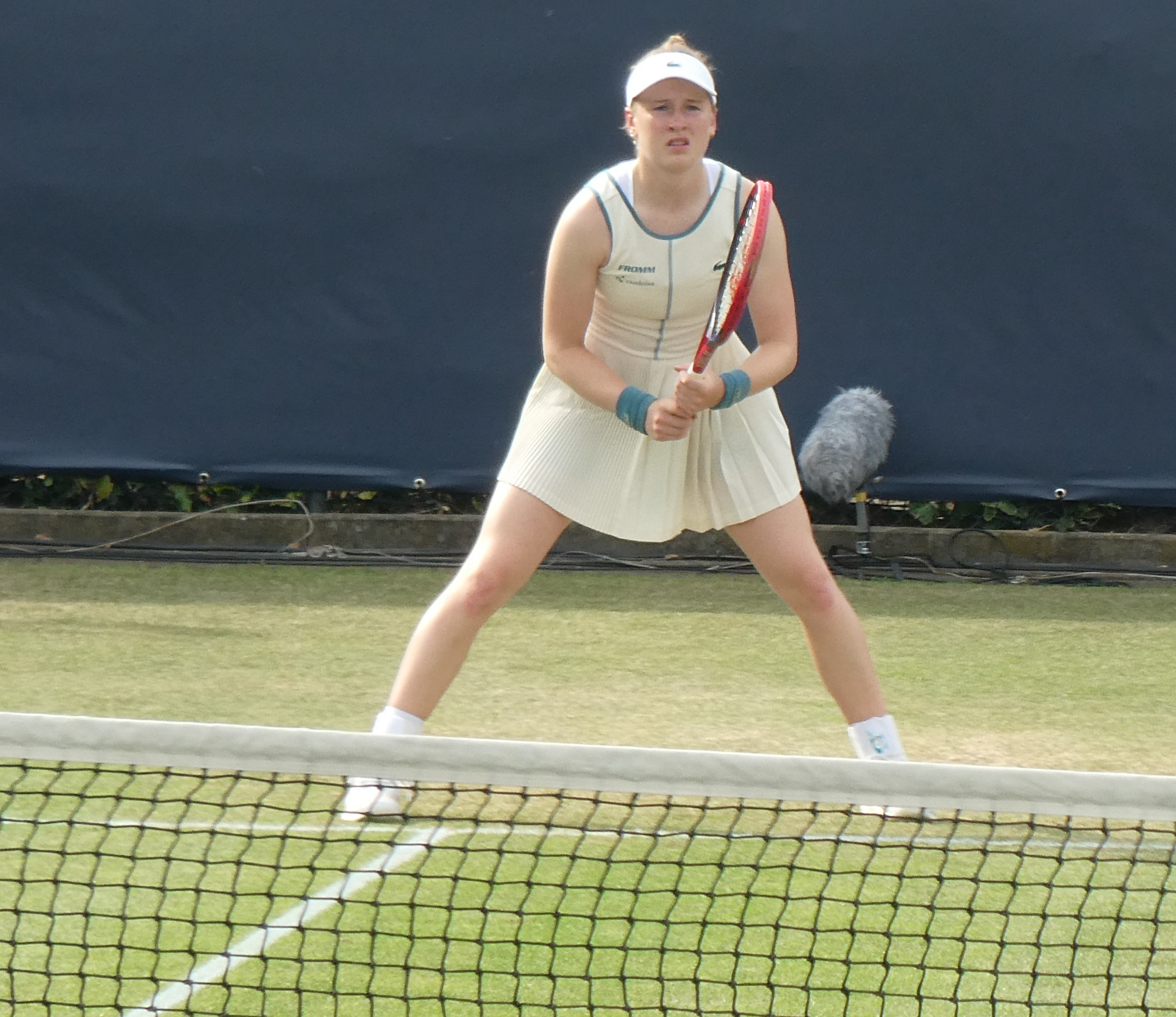
Naef at the 2024 Rosmalen Open

Ranked No. 161, she received again a wildcard for the Rosmalen Open in 's-Hertogenbosch and defeated qualifier Elizabeth Mandlik, before losing to second seed and eventual champion Liudmila Samsonova.

Partnering fellow Swiss player Belinda Bencic, she was runner-up in the doubles at the WTA 125 Open Angers, losing to Monica Niculescu and Elena-Gabriela Ruse in the final. The following week Naef reached the singles final at the WTA 125 Open de Limoges with wins over ninth seed Oceane Dodin, Sara Saito, fifth seed Erika Andreeva and Elsa Jacquemot. She lost the championship match to seventh seed Viktorija Golubic. Despite her defeat, Naef rose 28 places in the WTA rankings as a result of her run to the final, ending the 2024 season at World No.153.

== Performance timeline ==
Key
W	F	SF	QF	#R	RR	Q#	P#	DNQ	A	Z#	PO	G	S	B	NMS	NTI	P	NH

(W) winner; (F) finalist; (SF) semifinalist; (QF) quarterfinalist; (#R) rounds 4, 3, 2, 1; (RR) round-robin stage; (Q#) qualification round; (P#) preliminary round; (DNQ) did not qualify; (A) absent; (Z#) Davis/Fed Cup Zonal Group (with number indication) or (PO) play-off; (G) gold, (S) silver or (B) bronze Olympic/Paralympic medal; (NMS) not a Masters tournament; (NTI) not a Tier I tournament; (P) postponed; (NH) not held; (SR) strike rate (events won / competed); (W–L) win–loss record.
To avoid confusion and double counting, these charts are updated at the conclusion of a tournament or when the player's participation has ended.

Only main-draw results in WTA Tour, Grand Slam tournaments, Billie Jean King Cup and Olympic Games are included in win–loss records.

=== Singles ===
Current through the 2026 Wimbledon Championships.

Tournament	2023	2024	2025	2026	SR	W–L
Grand Slam tournaments
Australian Open	A	Q2	Q1	A	0 / 0	0–0
French Open	Q1	Q1	Q1	Q1	0 / 0	0–0
Wimbledon	1R	Q1	Q3	Q1	0 / 1	0–1
US Open	Q2	Q2	Q1	A	0 / 0	0–0
Win–loss	0–1	0–0	0–0	0–0	0 / 1	0–1
Year-end ranking	139	173	266			

== WTA 125 finals ==
=== Singles: 2 (2 runner-ups) ===
Result	W–L	Date	Tournament	Surface	Opponent	Score
Loss	0–1	Dec 2024	Open de Limoges, France	Hard (i)	(Switzerland) Viktorija Golubic	5–7, 4–6
Loss	0–2	Jun 2026	Ilkley Open, United Kingdom	Grass	(United States) Ashlyn Krueger	5–7, 2–6

=== Doubles: 3 (1 title, 2 runner-ups) ===
Result	W–L	Date	Tournament	Surface	Partner	Opponents	Score
Win	1–0	Dec 2023	Andorrà la Vella Open, Andorra	Hard (i)	Erika Andreeva	(Hungary) Tímea Babos (United Kingdom) Heather Watson	6–2, 6–1
Loss	1–1	Jul 2024	Warsaw Open, Poland	Hard	(Serbia) Nina Stojanović	(Poland) Weronika Falkowska (Poland) Martyna Kubka	4–6, 6–7^{(5)}
Loss	1–2	Dec 2024	Open Angers Arena Loire, France	Hard	(Switzerland) Belinda Bencic	(Romania) Monica Niculescu (Romania) Elena-Gabriela Ruse	3–6, 4–6

== ITF Circuit finals ==
=== Singles: 12 (10 titles, 2 runner-ups) ===
Legend
W80 tournaments (1–0)
W60/75 tournaments (1–2)
W40/50 tournaments (4–0)
W25/35 tournaments (2–0)
W15 tournaments (2–0)

Result	W–L	Date	Tournament	Tier	Surface	Opponent	Score
Win	1–0	Mar 2022	ITF Monastir, Tunisia	W15	Hard	(Germany) Lara Schmidt	3–6, 6–2, 7–5
Win	2–0	Oct 2022	ITF Reims, France	W15	Hard (i)	(France) Manon Léonard	6–2, 6–7^{(3)}, 6–3
Win	3–0	Oct 2022	ITF Cherbourg-en-Cotentin, France	W25+H	Hard (i)	(Spain) Irene Burillo	3–6, 7–5, 6–2
Win	4–0	Jan 2023	GB Pro-Series Loughborough, UK	W25+H	Hard (i)	(United Kingdom) Eliz Maloney	6–0, 6–4
Win	5–0	Jan 2023	Porto Indoor, Portugal	W40	Hard (i)	(Italy) Lucrezia Stefanini	6–2, 6–4
Loss	5–1	Apr 2023	Chiasso Open, Switzerland	W60	Clay	Mirra Andreeva	6–1, 6–7^{(3)}, 0–6
Win	6–1	Sep 2023	ITF Le Neubourg, France	W80+H	Hard	Alina Korneeva	4–6, 6–2, 7–6^{(7)}
Loss	6–2	Mar 2024	Trnava Indoor, Slovakia	W75	Hard (i)	(Netherlands) Suzan Lamens	2–6, 2–6
Win	7–2	Nov 2024	ITF Pétange, Luxembourg	W75	Hard (i)	(France) Océane Dodin	6–2, 6–4
Win	8–2	Jan 2026	ITF Manchester, UK	W50	Hard (i)	(Bulgaria) Elizara Yaneva	4–6, 6–1, 6–4
Win	9–2	Feb 2026	Open de l'Isère, France	W50	Hard (i)	(Belgium) Jeline Vandromme	7–5, 6–3
Win	10–2	Feb 2026	Open de Mâcon, France	W50	Hard (i)	(France) Julie Belgraver	6–4, 6–1

=== Doubles: 8 (7 titles, 1 runner-up) ===
Legend
W100 tournaments (1–0)
W75 tournaments (3–1)
W40/50 tournaments (2–0)
W15 tournaments (1–0)

Result	W–L	Date	Tournament	Tier	Surface	Partner	Opponents	Score
Win	1–0	Oct 2022	ITF Reims, France	W15	Hard (i)	(Slovakia) Irina Balus	(France) Mallaurie Noël (France) Margot Yerolymos	6–2, 6–0
Win	2–0	Feb 2023	Porto Indoor 1, Portugal	W40	Hard (i)	(Belgium) Yanina Wickmayer	(France) Alice Robbe (Croatia) Tara Würth	6–1, 6–4
Win	3–0	Feb 2024	Porto Indoor 3, Portugal	W75	Hard (i)	(Hungary) Anna Bondár	(Portugal) Francisca Jorge (Portugal) Matilde Jorge	6–4, 3–6, [11–9]
Win	4–0	May 2024	Zagreb Ladies Open, Croatia	W75	Clay	(Brazil) Laura Pigossi	(United Kingdom) Emily Appleton (India) Prarthana Thombare	4–6, 6–1, [10–8]
Win	5–0	Aug 2024	Cary Tennis Classic, United States	W100	Hard	(Slovenia) Tamara Zidanšek	(Georgia (country)) Oksana Kalashnikova; Iryna Shymanovich	4–6, 6–3, [11–9]
Win	6–0	Oct 2024	Internationaux de Poitiers, France	W75	Hard (i)	(Germany) Anna-Lena Friedsam	(Poland) Martyna Kubka (Switzerland) Conny Perrin	6–4, 6–1
Loss	6–1	Feb 2025	Trnava Indoor, Slovakia	W75	Hard (i)	Elena Pridankina	(Czech Republic) Jesika Malečková (Czech Republic) Miriam Škoch	7–5, 3–6, [2–10]
Win	7–1	Dec 2025	ITF Sëlva Gardena, Italy	W50	Hard (i)	(Poland) Weronika Falkowska	(Italy) Laura Mair (Italy) Lisa Peer	6–4, 6–4

== Junior finals ==
=== Grand Slam tournaments ===
==== Doubles: 1 (runner-up) ====
Result	Year	Tournament	Surface	Partner	Opponents	Score
Loss	2022	French Open	Clay	(Czech Republic) Nikola Bartůňková	(Czech Republic) Sára Bejlek (Czech Republic) Lucie Havlíčková	3–6, 3–6
