= 2024 Catalonia Open =

- Date: 29 April – 5 May
- Edition: 2nd
- Category: WTA 125
- Draw: 32S / 16D
- Prize money: $115,000
- Surface: Clay
- Location: Lleida, Spain
- Venue: Club Tennis Lleida

Champions

Singles
- (Czech Republic) Kateřina Siniaková

Doubles
- (United States) Nicole Melichar-Martinez / (Australia) Ellen Perez
- Catalonia Open

The 2024 Catalonia Open was a professional women's tennis tournament played on outdoor clay courts. It was the second edition of the tournament and part of the 2024 WTA 125 tournaments, offering a total of $115,000 in prize money. It took place at the Club Tennis Lleida in Lleida, Segrià, Spain between 29 April and 5 May 2024.

== Singles entrants ==
=== Seeds ===
Country	Player	Rank^{1}	Seed
USA	Emma Navarro	23	1
CZE	Kateřina Siniaková	40	2
NED	Arantxa Rus	47	3
POL	Magdalena Fręch	51	4
CHN	Wang Xiyu	52	5
USA	Sofia Kenin	60	6
COL	Camila Osorio	63	7
ROU	Ana Bogdan	64	8

- ^{1} Rankings are as of 22 April 2024.

=== Other entrants ===
The following players received a wildcard into the singles main draw:

- (Spain) Irene Burillo Escorihuela
- (United States) Sofia Kenin
- (Spain) Guiomar Maristany
- (Spain) Carlota Martínez Círez

The following players received entry into the main draw through qualification:

- (Sweden) Mirjam Björklund
- (Greece) Martha Matoula
- (Greece) Despina Papamichail
- (Czech Republic) Anna Sisková

== Doubles entrants ==
=== Seeds ===
Country	Player	Country	Player	Rank	Seed
USA	Nicole Melichar-Martinez	AUS	Ellen Perez	14	1
USA	Asia Muhammad	INA	Aldila Sutjiadi	71	2
KAZ	Anna Danilina	EST	Ingrid Neel	90	3
JPN	Eri Hozumi	JPN	Makoto Ninomiya	92	4

- Rankings as of 22 April 2024.

=== Other entrants ===
The following pair received a wildcard into the doubles main draw:

- (Spain) Irene Burillo Escorihuela / (Spain) Guiomar Maristany

== Champions ==
=== Singles ===
- (Czech Republic) Kateřina Siniaková def. (Egypt) Mayar Sherif, 6–4, 4–6, 6–3

=== Doubles ===
- (United States) Nicole Melichar-Martinez / (Australia) Ellen Perez def. (Poland) Katarzyna Piter / (Egypt) Mayar Sherif, 7–5, 6–2
