= 2026 Catalonia Open Solgironès =

- Date: 27 April–3 May 2026
- Edition: 4th
- Category: WTA 125
- Prize money: €100,000
- Surface: Clay / Outdoor
- Location: La Bisbal d'Empordà, Spain
- Venue: Club Esportiu CT La Bisbal

Champions

Singles
- (Australia) Daria Kasatkina

Doubles
- Elena Pridankina / (China) Tang Qianhui
- Catalonia Open

The 2026 Catalonia Open Solgironès was a professional women's tennis tournament played on outdoor clay courts. It was the fourth edition of the tournament and part of the 2026 WTA 125 Circuit. It took place at Club de Tennis La Bisbal Centre Esportiu in La Bisbal d'Empordà, Spain between 27 April and 3 May 2026.

== Singles entrants ==
=== Seeds ===
Country	Player	Rank^{1}	Seed
CHN	Wang Xinyu	31	1
USA	Peyton Stearns	43	2
ESP	Jéssica Bouzas Maneiro	50	3
CRO	Antonia Ružić	59	4
BRA	Beatriz Haddad Maia	69	5
UZB	Kamilla Rakhimova	73	6
AUS	Daria Kasatkina	75	7
	Oksana Selekhmeteva	77	8

- ^{1} Rankings are as of 20 April 2026.

=== Other entrants ===
The following players received wildcards into the singles main draw:

- (Spain) Aliona Bolsova
- (Australia) Daria Kasatkina
- (Spain) Ane Mintegi del Olmo
- (Spain) Sara Sorribes Tormo

The following players received entry from the qualifying draw:

- (Argentina) Victoria Bosio
- (Spain) Carlota Martínez Círez
- (Brazil) Laura Pigossi
- (Germany) Caroline Werner

=== Withdrawals ===
- (Philippines) Alexandra Eala → replaced by (United States) Varvara Lepchenko
- (Canada) Leylah Fernandez → replaced by (Slovakia) Rebecca Šramková
- (United States) McCartney Kessler → replaced by (Switzerland) Rebeka Masarova
- (Czech Republic) Barbora Krejčíková → replaced by (Australia) Storm Hunter
- (United States) Ann Li → replaced by (Colombia) Emiliana Arango
- (Germany) Eva Lys → replaced by Elena Pridankina
- (Austria) Anastasia Potapova → replaced by (Spain) Marina Bassols Ribera
- (Egypt) Mayar Sherif → replaced by (Spain) Kaitlin Quevedo
- (Germany) Laura Siegemund → replaced by Alina Charaeva
- (Argentina) Solana Sierra → replaced by (Italy) Lucrezia Stefanini
- (Czech Republic) Kateřina Siniaková → replaced by (Germany) Tamara Korpatsch
- (Ukraine) Yuliia Starodubtseva → replaced by (Switzerland) Jil Teichmann

== Doubles entrants ==
=== Seeds ===
Country	Player	Country	Player	Rank^{1}	Seed
AUS	Storm Hunter	NZL	Erin Routliffe	31	1
SVK	Tereza Mihalíková	GBR	Olivia Nicholls	60	2

- ^{1} Rankings as of 20 April 2026.

=== Other entrants ===
The following team received a wildcard into the doubles main draw:

- (Spain) Marina Bassols Ribera / (Spain) Aliona Bolsova

== Champions ==
=== Singles ===
- (Australia) Daria Kasatkina def. (Germany) Tamara Korpatsch, 2–6, 6–3, 7–5

=== Doubles ===
- Elena Pridankina / (China) Tang Qianhui def. (Slovakia) Tereza Mihalíková / (United Kingdom) Olivia Nicholls, 6–1, 6–3
