= 2024 Grand Prix SAR La Princesse Lalla Meryem – Doubles =

Doubles
- 2024 Grand Prix SAR La Princesse Lalla Meryem

Final
- Champions: Irina Khromacheva; Yana Sizikova
- Runners-up: (Kazakhstan) Anna Danilina (China) Xu Yifan
- Score: 6–3, 6–2

Events
Singles	Doubles
- Grand Prix SAR La Princesse Lalla Meryem

Irina Khromacheva and Yana Sizikova defeated Anna Danilina and Xu Yifan in the final, 6–3, 6–2 to win the doubles tennis title at the 2024 Morocco Open.

Sabrina Santamaria and Sizikova were the reigning champions, but chose not to compete together this year. Santamaria entered the draw with Camila Osorio as alternates, but lost in the first round to Eri Hozumi and Makoto Ninomiya.

== Seeds ==
1. (China) Guo Hanyu / (China) Jiang Xinyu (semifinals)
2. (Kazakhstan) Anna Danilina / (China) Xu Yifan (final)
3. (Japan) Eri Hozumi / (Japan) Makoto Ninomiya (semifinals)
4. Irina Khromacheva / Yana Sizikova (champions)

== Draw ==
Key

- Q = Qualifier
- WC = Wild card
- LL = Lucky loser
- Alt = Alternate
- ITF = ITF entry
- PR = Protected ranking
- SR = Special ranking
- SE = Special exempt
- JE = Junior exempt
- JR = Junior Accelerator Programme entrant
- CO = College Accelerator Programme entrant
- NG = Next Gen Accelerator Program entrant
- w/o = Walkover
- r = Retired
- d = Defaulted

=== Draw ===
First round
1	(China) H Guo (China) X Jiang	7	7
(Italy) A Moratelli (Italy) C Rosatello	5	5
(Brazil) I Martins (United Kingdom) O Nicholls	0	1
(United Kingdom) M Lumsden (Czech Republic) A Sisková	6	6
4	I Khromacheva; Y Sizikova	6	3	[10]
(United States) P Stearns (China) S Zhang	4	6	[6]
(Georgia (country)) O Kalashnikova (Belgium) K Zimmermann	6	6
WC	(Morocco) M El Allami (Morocco) A El Aouni	3	3
(United Kingdom) S Murray Sharan (Poland) K Piter	6^{4}	3
(Italy) L Bronzetti (China) Y Wang	7^{7}	6
Alt	(Colombia) C Osorio (United States) S Santamaria	6	4	[7]
3	(Japan) E Hozumi (Japan) M Ninomiya	2	6	[10]
WC	(Morocco) Y Kabbaj; E Yashina	1	3
Alt	(United Kingdom) H Dart (China) Xiy Wang	6	6
L Marozava (Netherlands) A Rus	3	2
2	(Kazakhstan) A Danilina (China) Y Xu	6	6

Quarterfinals
1	(China) H Guo (China) X Jiang	5	6	[10]
(United Kingdom) M Lumsden (Czech Republic) A Sisková	7	2	[6]
4	I Khromacheva; Y Sizikova	6	6
(Georgia (country)) O Kalashnikova (Belgium) K Zimmermann	3	2
(Italy) L Bronzetti (China) Y Wang	2	2
3	(Japan) E Hozumi (Japan) M Ninomiya	6	6
Alt	(United Kingdom) H Dart (China) Xiy Wang	6	3	[7]
2	(Kazakhstan) A Danilina (China) Y Xu	0	6	[10]

Semifinals
1	(China) H Guo (China) X Jiang	6	5	[6]
4	I Khromacheva; Y Sizikova	1	7	[10]
3	(Japan) E Hozumi (Japan) M Ninomiya	4	4
2	(Kazakhstan) A Danilina (China) Y Xu	6	6

Final
4	I Khromacheva; Y Sizikova	6	6
2	(Kazakhstan) A Danilina (China) Y Xu	3	2
