= 2021 Winners Open – Singles =

Singles
- 2021 Winners Open

Final
- Champion: (Germany) Andrea Petkovic
- Runner-up: (Egypt) Mayar Sherif
- Score: 6–1, 6–1

Details
- Draw: 32
- Seeds: 8

Events
Singles	Doubles
← 2020 ·	Winners Open

Andrea Petkovic won her first title since 2015, defeating Mayar Sherif in the final, 6–1, 6–1. Sherif became the first Egyptian player to be in the final of a WTA Tour tournament.

== Seeds ==
1. (France) Alizé Cornet (first round)
2. (Germany) Andrea Petkovic (champion)
3. (Romania) Ana Bogdan (second round)
4. (Italy) Martina Trevisan (first round)
5. (Romania) Elena-Gabriela Ruse (first round)
6. (Slovenia) Kaja Juvan (second round)
7. (Bulgaria) Viktoriya Tomova (first round)
8. (Slovakia) Kristína Kučová (quarterfinals)

== Draw ==
=== Key ===
- Q = Qualifier
- WC = Wild card
- LL = Lucky loser
- Alt = Alternate
- SE = Special exempt
- PR = Protected ranking
- ITF = ITF entry
- JE = Junior exempt
- w/o = Walkover
- r = Retired
- d = Defaulted
- SR = Special ranking

=== Finals ===
Semifinals
(Egypt) Mayar Sherif	7^{7}	6
(Romania) Mihaela Buzărnescu	6^{1}	4
Q	(Serbia) Aleksandra Krunić	4	2
2/PR	(Germany) Andrea Petkovic	6	6

Final
(Egypt) Mayar Sherif	1	1
2/PR	(Germany) Andrea Petkovic	6	6

=== Top half ===
First round
1	(France) A Cornet	2	4
(Egypt) M Sherif	6	6
WC	(Philippines) A Eala	7	6
Q	(Argentina) P Ormaechea	5	2
(Germany) A-L Friedsam	2	3
(Romania) I Bara	6	6
(Turkey) Ç Büyükakçay	1	1
8	(Slovakia) K Kučová	6	6
4	(Italy) M Trevisan	4	4
(Czech Republic) Kr Plíšková	6	6
WC	(Romania) B Szabó	2	1
(Poland) K Kawa	6	6
WC	(Romania) E Tiron	0	0
(Spain) L Arruabarrena	6	6
(Romania) M Buzărnescu	6	6
7	(Bulgaria) V Tomova	2	3

Second round
(Egypt) M Sherif	6	6
WC	(Philippines) A Eala	2	2
(Romania) I Bara	6	6^{3}	6^{5}
8	(Slovakia) K Kučová	2	7^{7}	7^{7}
(Czech Republic) Kr Plíšková	6	6
(Poland) K Kawa	4	4
(Spain) L Arruabarrena	3	5
(Romania) M Buzărnescu	6	7

Quarterfinals
(Egypt) M Sherif	6	6
8	(Slovakia) K Kučová	3	1
(Czech Republic) Kr Plíšková	5	3
(Romania) M Buzărnescu	7	6

Semifinals
(Egypt) M Sherif	7^{7}	6
(Romania) M Buzărnescu	6^{1}	4

=== Bottom half ===
First round
6	(Slovenia) K Juvan	6	6
(Russia) M Melnikova	1	1
(Slovakia) V Kužmová	4	2
(Slovakia) AK Schmiedlová	6	6
Q	(Serbia) A Krunić	6	5
(Japan) Y Naito	3	0^{r}
Q	(Hungary) P Udvardy	2	4
3	(Romania) A Bogdan	6	6
5/WC	(Romania) E-G Ruse	3	3
(Ukraine) L Tsurenko	6	6
Q	(Croatia) J Fett	2	2
Q	(Australia) S Mendez	6	6
(Hungary) RL Jani	1	2
(Romania) J Cristian	6	6
Q	(Romania) A Dulgheru	3	1^{r}
2/PR	(Germany) A Petkovic	6	4

Second round
6	(Slovenia) K Juvan	6^{7}	0
(Slovakia) AK Schmiedlová	7^{9}	6
Q	(Serbia) A Krunić	6	6
3	(Romania) A Bogdan	3	3
(Ukraine) L Tsurenko	3^{r}
Q	(Australia) S Mendez	4
(Romania) J Cristian	4	3
2/PR	(Germany) A Petkovic	6	6

Quarterfinals
(Slovakia) AK Schmiedlová	3	0
Q	(Serbia) A Krunić	6	6
Q	(Australia) S Mendez	7^{8}	4	1
2/PR	(Germany) A Petkovic	6^{6}	6	6

Semifinals
Q	(Serbia) A Krunić	4	2
2/PR	(Germany) A Petkovic	6	6

== Qualifying ==
=== Seeds ===
1. (Hungary) Panna Udvardy (qualified)
2. (Hungary) Anna Bondár (first round)
3. (Argentina) Paula Ormaechea (qualified)
4. (Croatia) Jana Fett (qualified)
5. (Romania) Gabriela Talabă (qualifying competition)
6. (Bulgaria) Isabella Shinikova (first round)
7. (Chile) Daniela Seguel (first round)
8. (Belgium) Marie Benoît (first round)
9. (Romania) Irina Fetecău (qualifying competition)
10. (Italy) Lucrezia Stefanini (qualifying competition)
11. (Italy) Jessica Pieri (first round)
12. (Mexico) Ana Sofía Sánchez (qualifying competition)

=== Qualifiers ===
1. (Hungary) Panna Udvardy
2. (Serbia) Aleksandra Krunić
3. (Argentina) Paula Ormaechea
4. (Croatia) Jana Fett
5. (Romania) Alexandra Dulgheru
6. (Australia) Seone Mendez

=== Qualifying draw ===
==== First qualifier ====
First round
1	(Hungary) Panna Udvardy	6	6
(Italy) Martina Di Giuseppe	1	3
(Norway) Ulrikke Eikeri	3	3
12	(Mexico) Ana Sofía Sánchez	6	6

Qualifying competition
1	(Hungary) Panna Udvardy	6	4	6
12	(Mexico) Ana Sofía Sánchez	2	6	4

==== Second qualifier ====
First round
2	(Hungary) Anna Bondár	5	2
(Serbia) Aleksandra Krunić	7	6
WC	(Romania) Miriam Bulgaru	1	6	6
7	(Chile) Daniela Seguel	6	2	3

Qualifying competition
(Serbia) Aleksandra Krunić	6	6
WC	(Romania) Miriam Bulgaru	1	2

==== Third qualifier ====
First round
3	(Argentina) Paula Ormaechea	7	6
(Greece) Valentini Grammatikopoulou	5	4
(Romania) Alexandra Ignatik	6	2	0
10	(Italy) Lucrezia Stefanini	3	6	6

Qualifying competition
3	(Argentina) Paula Ormaechea	4	7^{7}	6
10	(Italy) Lucrezia Stefanini	6	6^{5}	4

==== Fourth qualifier ====
First round
4	(Croatia) Jana Fett	6	6
(Croatia) Tena Lukas	2	4
WC	(Romania) Vanessa Popa Teiușanu	7^{7}	7
11	(Italy) Jessica Pieri	6^{4}	5

Qualifying competition
4	(Croatia) Jana Fett	6	6
WC	(Romania) Vanessa Popa Teiușanu	4	1

==== Fifth qualifier ====
First round
5	(Romania) Gabriela Talabă	6	6
WC	(Romania) Ilinca Amariei	4	1
WC	(Romania) Alexandra Dulgheru	6	6
8	(Belgium) Marie Benoît	3	3

Qualifying competition
5	(Romania) Gabriela Talabă	6	4	4
WC	(Romania) Alexandra Dulgheru	4	6	6

==== Sixth qualifier ====
First round
6	(Bulgaria) Isabella Shinikova	0	2
(Australia) Seone Mendez	6	6
(United States) Katerina Stewart	1	5
9	(Romania) Irina Fetecău	6	7

Qualifying competition
(Australia) Seone Mendez	4	6	6
9	(Romania) Irina Fetecău	6	3	1
