= 2024 Grand Prix SAR La Princesse Lalla Meryem – Singles =

Singles
- 2024 Grand Prix SAR La Princesse Lalla Meryem

Final
- Champion: (United States) Peyton Stearns
- Runner-up: (Egypt) Mayar Sherif
- Score: 6–2, 6–1

Details
- Draw: 32
- Seeds: 8

Events
Singles	Doubles
- Grand Prix SAR La Princesse Lalla Meryem

Peyton Stearns defeated Mayar Sherif in the final, 6–2, 6–1 to win the singles title at the 2024 Morocco Open. It was her first WTA Tour title. She saved two match points en route to the title, against the defending champion Lucia Bronzetti in the quarterfinals after being down 0–5 in the final set.

This was the first edition of the tournament since 2007 where all four semifinalists were unseeded.

== Seeds ==
1. (China) Yuan Yue (first round)
2. Anna Blinkova (first round)
3. (Spain) Sara Sorribes Tormo (quarterfinals)
4. (Italy) Lucia Bronzetti (quarterfinals)
5. (Netherlands) Arantxa Rus (first round)
6. (China) Wang Xiyu (second round)
7. (Italy) Elisabetta Cocciaretto (quarterfinals)
8. (China) Zhu Lin (first round)

== Draw ==
Key

- Q = Qualifier
- WC = Wild card
- LL = Lucky loser
- Alt = Alternate
- ITF = ITF entry
- PR = Protected ranking
- SR = Special ranking
- SE = Special exempt
- JE = Junior exempt
- JR = Junior Accelerator Programme entrant
- CO = College Accelerator Programme entrant
- NG = Next Gen Accelerator Program entrant
- w/o = Walkover
- r = Retired
- d = Defaulted

=== Finals ===
Semifinals
Kamilla Rakhimova	0	1
(Egypt) Mayar Sherif	6	6
(United States) Peyton Stearns	6^{6}	7	7^{7}
(Bulgaria) Viktoriya Tomova	7^{8}	5	6^{4}

Final
(Egypt) Mayar Sherif	2	1
(United States) Peyton Stearns	6	6

=== Top half ===
First round
1	(China) Y Yuan	6^{7}	6	4
Q	(Italy) C Rosatello	7^{9}	1	6
K Rakhimova	2
(United States) T Townsend	0^{r}
(United States) K Day	3	6^{4}
(China) Z Bai	6	7^{7}
WC	(Morocco) Y Kabbaj	3	4
7	(Italy) E Cocciaretto	6	6
3	(Spain) S Sorribes Tormo	6	6
(United Kingdom) H Dart	2	0
(Argentina) N Podoroska	6	6
(Germany) T Maria	2	4
WC	(Morocco) A El Aouni	2	1
(Egypt) M Sherif	6	6
(Argentina) ML Carlé	6	6
5	(Netherlands) A Rus	3	3

Second round
Q	(Italy) C Rosatello	0^{r}
K Rakhimova	4
(China) Z Bai	4	2
7	(Italy) E Cocciaretto	6	6
3	(Spain) S Sorribes Tormo	7	3	6
(Argentina) N Podoroska	5	6	3
(Egypt) M Sherif	6	6
(Argentina) ML Carlé	3	2

Quarterfinals
K Rakhimova	7	7
7	(Italy) E Cocciaretto	5	5
3	(Spain) S Sorribes Tormo	3	3
(Egypt) M Sherif	6	6

Semifinals
K Rakhimova	0	1
(Egypt) M Sherif	6	6

=== Bottom half ===
First round
6	(China) Xiy Wang	7^{7}	7
Q	(Italy) N Brancaccio	6^{5}	5
(United States) P Stearns	5	6	6
Q	(Serbia) A Krunić	7	2	1
(Italy) M Trevisan	7	4	6
(Japan) N Hibino	5	6	3
WC	(Morocco) M El Allami	1	0
4	(Italy) L Bronzetti	6	6
8	(China) L Zhu	6	0	2
(China) Y Wang	4	6	6
Q	(Turkey) B Cengiz	2	1
(Bulgaria) V Tomova	6	6
(Colombia) C Osorio	3	6	4
E Avanesyan	6	4	0^{r}
(Germany) L Siegemund	6	7^{7}
2	A Blinkova	1	6^{4}

Second round
6	(China) Xiy Wang	3	1
(United States) P Stearns	6	6
(Italy) M Trevisan	2	3
4	(Italy) L Bronzetti	6	6
(China) Y Wang	6^{4}	0
(Bulgaria) V Tomova	7^{7}	6
(Colombia) C Osorio	4	4
(Germany) L Siegemund	6	6

Quarterfinals
(United States) P Stearns	6	4	7
4	(Italy) L Bronzetti	4	6	5
(Bulgaria) V Tomova	6	6
(Germany) L Siegemund	4	3

Semifinals
(United States) P Stearns	6^{6}	7	7^{7}
(Bulgaria) V Tomova	7^{8}	5	6^{4}

== Qualifying ==
=== Seeds ===
1. (Australia) Ajla Tomljanović (withdrew)
2. (France) Kristina Mladenovic (first round)
3. Sofya Lansere (first round)
4. (Spain) Leyre Romero Gormaz (withdrew, still competing in Madrid)
5. (Hungary) Fanny Stollár (first round)
6. (Italy) Giorgia Pedone (first round)
7. Tatiana Prozorova (first round)
8. (Mexico) Ana Sofía Sánchez (first round)

=== Qualifiers ===
1. (Italy) Camilla Rosatello
2. (Italy) Nuria Brancaccio
3. (Serbia) Aleksandra Krunić
4. (Turkey) Berfu Cengiz

=== Qualifying draw ===
==== First qualifier ====
First round
Alt	(Poland) Martyna Kubka	4	7^{7}	4
(Italy) Camilla Rosatello	6	6^{4}	6
(Italy) Dalila Spiteri	6	6
8	(Mexico) Ana Sofía Sánchez	3	4

Qualifying competition
(Italy) Camilla Rosatello	6	6
(Italy) Dalila Spiteri	4	1

==== Second qualifier ====
First round
2	(France) Kristina Mladenovic	2	1
(Italy) Nuria Brancaccio	6	6
(Mexico) Victoria Rodríguez	6	7^{7}
6	(Italy) Giorgia Pedone	4	6^{5}

Qualifying competition
(Italy) Nuria Brancaccio	6	6
(Mexico) Victoria Rodríguez	4	3

==== Third qualifier ====
First round
3	Sofya Lansere	4	1
PR	(Serbia) Aleksandra Krunić	6	6
(Poland) Maja Chwalińska	6	6
7	Tatiana Prozorova	3	1

Qualifying competition
PR	(Serbia) Aleksandra Krunić	4	6	6
(Poland) Maja Chwalińska	6	0	3

==== Fourth qualifier ====
First round
Alt	(Turkey) Ayla Aksu	4	3
(Malta) Francesca Curmi	6	6
(Turkey) Berfu Cengiz	6	2	7^{9}
5	(Hungary) Fanny Stollár	4	6	6^{7}

Qualifying competition
(Malta) Francesca Curmi	3	2
(Turkey) Berfu Cengiz	6	6
