= 2021 Winners Open =

Women's tennis tournament

- Date: 2–8 August
- Edition: 1st
- Category: WTA 250
- Draw: 32S / 16D
- Prize money: $235,000
- Surface: Clay
- Location: Cluj-Napoca, Romania
- Venue: Winners Sports Club

Champions

Singles
- (Germany) Andrea Petkovic

Doubles
- (Russia) Natela Dzalamidze / (Slovenia) Kaja Juvan
- Winners Open

The 2021 WTA Romanian Open, known as the Winners Open due to sponsorship reasons, was a professional women's tennis tournament played on outdoor clay courts at the Winners Sports Club. It was the 1st edition of the tournament held in the city of Cluj-Napoca and was a part of the 2021 WTA Tour.

== Finals ==
=== Singles ===
- (Germany) Andrea Petkovic def. (Egypt) Mayar Sherif, 6–1, 6–1.

This was Petkovic's seventh WTA Tour singles title, and first since 2015.

=== Doubles ===
- (Russia) Natela Dzalamidze / (Slovenia) Kaja Juvan def. (Poland) Katarzyna Piter / (Egypt) Mayar Sherif, 6–3, 6–4.

This was the maiden WTA Tour title won by both Dzalamidze and Juvan.

== Singles main-draw entrants ==
=== Seeds ===
Country	Player	Rank^{1}	Seed
FRA	Alizé Cornet	63	1
GER	Andrea Petkovic	97	2
ROU	Ana Bogdan	101	3
ITA	Martina Trevisan	102	4
ROU	Elena-Gabriela Ruse	105	5
SLO	Kaja Juvan	114	6
BUL	Viktoriya Tomova	119	7
SVK	Kristína Kučová	120	8

- Rankings are as of July 26, 2021.

=== Other entrants ===
The following players received wildcards into the main draw:

- (Philippines) Alex Eala
- (Romania) Elena-Gabriela Ruse
- (Romania) Briana Szabó
- (Romania) Evelyne Tiron

The following player received entry using a protected ranking:

- (Germany) Andrea Petkovic

The following players received entry from the qualifying draw:

- (Romania) Alexandra Dulgheru
- (Croatia) Jana Fett
- (Serbia) Aleksandra Krunić
- (Australia) Seone Mendez
- (Argentina) Paula Ormaechea
- (Hungary) Panna Udvardy

=== Withdrawals ===
Before the tournament

- (Hungary) Tímea Babos → replaced by (Poland) Katarzyna Kawa
- (Romania) Irina-Camelia Begu → replaced by (Slovakia) Viktória Kužmová
- (Italy) Elisabetta Cocciaretto → replaced by (Romania) Mihaela Buzărnescu
- (Kazakhstan) Zarina Diyas → replaced by (Romania) Jaqueline Cristian
- (Italy) Sara Errani → replaced by (Slovakia) Kristína Kučová
- (Switzerland) Viktorija Golubic → replaced by (Egypt) Mayar Sherif
- (Slovenia) Polona Hercog → replaced by (Slovakia) Anna Karolína Schmiedlová
- (Czech Republic) Tereza Martincová → replaced by (Ukraine) Lesia Tsurenko
- (Italy) Jasmine Paolini → replaced by (Hungary) Réka Luca Jani
- (Netherlands) Arantxa Rus → replaced by (Turkey) Çağla Büyükakçay
- (Romania) Patricia Maria Țig → replaced by (Spain) Lara Arruabarrena

== Doubles main-draw entrants ==
=== Seeds ===
Country	Player	Country	Player	Rank^{1}	Seed
SVK	Viktória Kužmová	POL	Alicja Rosolska	140	1
SRB	Aleksandra Krunić	BLR	Lidziya Marozava	150	2
ESP	Lara Arruabarrena	ROU	Andreea Mitu	186	3
GEO	Oksana Kalashnikova	SVK	Tereza Mihalíková	233	4

- Rankings are as of July 26, 2021.

=== Other entrants ===
The following pairs received wildcards into the doubles main draw:

- (Romania) Ana Bogdan / (Romania) Jaqueline Cristian
- (Romania) Miriam Bulgaru / (Romania) Irina Fetecău

The following pair received entry using a protected ranking:

- (Russia) Alexandra Panova / (Germany) Julia Wachaczyk

=== Withdrawals ===
Before the tournament

- (Romania) Irina-Camelia Begu / (Romania) Andreea Mitu → replaced by (Spain) Lara Arruabarrena / (Romania) Andreea Mitu
- (Hungary) Anna Bondár / (Hungary) Fanny Stollár → replaced by (Poland) Katarzyna Piter / (Egypt) Mayar Sherif
- (Kazakhstan) Anna Danilina / (Norway) Ulrikke Eikeri → replaced by (Hungary) Anna Bondár / (Norway) Ulrikke Eikeri
- (Slovakia) Viktória Kužmová / (Netherlands) Arantxa Rus → replaced by (Russia) Alena Fomina / (Russia) Ekaterina Yashina
- (Germany) Vivian Heisen / (Poland) Alicja Rosolska → replaced by (Slovakia) Viktória Kužmová / (Poland) Alicja Rosolska
- (Georgia (country)) Ekaterine Gorgodze / (Poland) Paula Kania-Choduń → replaced by (Romania) Oana Georgeta Simion / (Romania) Gabriela Talabă
