= 2024 Catalonia Open – Singles =

Singles
- 2024 Catalonia Open

Final
- Champion: (Czech Republic) Kateřina Siniaková
- Runner-up: (Egypt) Mayar Sherif
- Score: 6–4, 4–6, 6–3

Details
- Draw: 32
- Seeds: 8

Events
Singles	Doubles
- Catalonia Open

Kateřina Siniaková won the singles title at the 2024 Catalonia Open, defeating Mayar Sherif in the final, 6–4, 4–6, 6–3.

Sorana Cîrstea was the reigning champion, but did not participate this year.

== Seeds ==
1. (United States) Emma Navarro (quarterfinals, withdrew)
2. (Czech Republic) Kateřina Siniaková (champion)
3. (Netherlands) Arantxa Rus (quarterfinals)
4. (Poland) Magdalena Fręch (quarterfinals)
5. (China) Wang Xiyu (first round)
6. (United States) Sofia Kenin (second round)
7. (Colombia) Camila Osorio (semifinals)
8. (Romania) Ana Bogdan (second round)

== Draw ==
Key

- Q = Qualifier
- WC = Wild card
- LL = Lucky loser
- Alt = Alternate
- ITF = ITF entry
- PR = Protected ranking
- SR = Special ranking
- SE = Special exempt
- JE = Junior exempt
- JR = Junior Accelerator Programme entrant
- CO = College Accelerator Programme entrant
- NG = Next Gen Accelerator Program entrant
- w/o = Walkover
- r = Retired
- d = Defaulted

=== Finals ===
Semifinals
(Egypt) Mayar Sherif	6	6
WC	(Spain) Guiomar Maristany	2	3
7	(Colombia) Camila Osorio	3	4
2	(Czech Republic) Kateřina Siniaková	6	6

Final
(Egypt) Mayar Sherif	4	6	3
2	(Czech Republic) Kateřina Siniaková	6	4	6

=== Top half ===
First round
1	(United States) E Navarro	7	4	6
(United States) B Pera	5	6	1
(United States) E Mandlik	6	6
(United States) C Liu	1	3
A Sasnovich	3	6	3
(Egypt) M Sherif	6	3	6
(Spain) N Párrizas Díaz	1	1
8	(Romania) A Bogdan	6	6
3	(Netherlands) A Rus	6	6
K Rakhimova	3	4
(Spain) R Masarova	6	5	6^{1}
E Andreeva	3	7	7^{7}
(Japan) N Hibino	4	6	1
WC	(Spain) G Maristany	6	1	6
(Serbia) D Radanović	1	6	6
5	(China) Xiy Wang	6	3	4

Second round
1	(United States) E Navarro	6	6
(United States) E Mandlik	4	1
(Egypt) M Sherif	6	4	6
8	(Romania) A Bogdan	3	6	1
3	(Netherlands) A Rus	6	6
E Andreeva	4	0
WC	(Spain) G Maristany	6
(Serbia) D Radanović	5^{r}

Quarterfinals
1	(United States) E Navarro
(Egypt) M Sherif	w/o
3	(Netherlands) A Rus	6	2	4
WC	(Spain) G Maristany	3	6	6

Semifinals
(Egypt) M Sherif	6	6
WC	(Spain) G Maristany	2	3

=== Bottom half ===
First round
7	(Colombia) C Osorio	4
Q	(Sweden) M Björklund	1^{r}
(Croatia) L Ćirić Bagarić	6	6
(France) O Dodin	4	4
Q	(Czech Republic) A Sisková	4	1
(Croatia) L Bošković	6	6
Q	(Greece) D Papamichail	2	4
4	(Poland) M Fręch	6	6
6/WC	(United States) S Kenin	2	6	6
WC	(Spain) I Burillo Escorihuela	6	4	4
(United States) A Krueger	6	6
Q	(Greece) M Matoula	2	1
(North Macedonia) L Gjorcheska	3	7	6
WC	(Spain) C Martínez Círez	6	5	1
(United States) A Parks	2	4
2	(Czech Republic) K Siniaková	6	6

Second round
7	(Colombia) C Osorio	6	1	6
(Croatia) L Ćirić Bagarić	0	6	1
(Croatia) L Bošković	3	1
4	(Poland) M Fręch	6	6
6/WC	(United States) S Kenin	3	7	5
(United States) A Krueger	6	5	7
(North Macedonia) L Gjorcheska	2	2
2	(Czech Republic) K Siniaková	6	6

Quarterfinals
7	(Colombia) C Osorio	4	7^{10}	7^{7}
4	(Poland) M Fręch	6	6^{8}	6^{4}
(United States) A Krueger	6	2	1
2	(Czech Republic) K Siniaková	2	6	6

Semifinals
7	(Colombia) C Osorio	3	4
2	(Czech Republic) K Siniaková	6	6

== Qualifying ==
=== Seeds ===
1. (Greece) Despina Papamichail (qualified)
2. (Sweden) Mirjam Björklund (qualified)
3. (Malta) Francesca Curmi (qualifying competition)
4. (Greece) Martha Matoula (qualified)

=== Qualifiers ===
1. (Greece) Despina Papamichail
2. (Sweden) Mirjam Björklund
3. (Czech Republic) Anna Sisková
4. (Greece) Martha Matoula

=== Qualifying draw ===
==== First qualifier ====
Qualifying competition
1	(Greece) Despina Papamichail	6	6
WC	(Spain) Yvonne Cavallé Reimers	4	0

==== Second qualifier ====
Qualifying competition
2	(Sweden) Mirjam Björklund	6	7
	(Andorra) Victoria Jiménez Kasintseva	2	5

==== Third qualifier ====
Qualifying competition
3	(Malta) Francesca Curmi	3	6	3
	(Czech Republic) Anna Sisková	6	2	6

==== Fourth qualifier ====
Qualifying competition
4	(Greece) Martha Matoula	6	5	6
WC	(Spain) Martina Genís Salas	2	7	2
