= Winners Open =

Tennis event located in Cluj-Napoca, Romania

Defunct tennis tournament
- Founded: 2021
- Abolished: 2021
- Location: Cluj-Napoca; Romania
- Venue: Winners Sports Club
- Category: WTA 250
- Surface: Clay court / outdoor
- Draw: 32S / 32Q / 16D
- Prize money: US$ 235,238
- Website: Official website

Current champions (2021)
- Women's singles: (Germany) Andrea Petkovic
- Women's doubles: (Russia) Natela Dzalamidze (Slovenia) Kaja Juvan

The Winners Open was a WTA 250 tournament located in Cluj-Napoca, Romania. The sole edition of the tournament was held in August 2021.

== Past finals ==
=== Singles ===
Year	Champion	Runner-up	Score
2021	(Germany) Andrea Petkovic	(Egypt) Mayar Sherif	6–1, 6–1

=== Doubles ===
Year	Champions	Runners-up	Score
2021	(Russia) Natela Dzalamidze (Slovenia) Kaja Juvan	(Poland) Katarzyna Piter (Egypt) Mayar Sherif	6–3, 6–4

== See also ==
- Transylvania Open
- Bucharest Open
- Romanian Open
- List of tennis tournaments
