= 2026 Catalonia Open Solgironès – Singles =

Tennis tournament

Singles
- 2026 Catalonia Open Solgironès

Final
- Champion: (Australia) Daria Kasatkina
- Runner-up: (Germany) Tamara Korpatsch
- Score: 2–6, 6–3, 7–5

Details
- Draw: 32 (4 WC)
- Seeds: 8

Events
Singles	Doubles
- Catalonia Open

Daria Kasatkina won the singles title at the 2026 Catalonia Open Solgironès, defeating Tamara Korpatsch in the final, 2–6, 6–3, 7–5.

Dalma Gálfi was the defending champion, but lost in the first round to Alina Charaeva.

== Seeds ==
1. (China) Wang Xinyu (second round)
2. (United States) Peyton Stearns (first round)
3. (Spain) Jéssica Bouzas Maneiro (first round)
4. (Croatia) Antonia Ružić (second round)
5. (Brazil) Beatriz Haddad Maia (quarterfinals)
6. (Uzbekistan) Kamilla Rakhimova (first round)
7. (Australia) Daria Kasatkina (champion)
8. Oksana Selekhmeteva (first round)

== Draw ==
Key

- Q = Qualifier
- WC = Wild card
- LL = Lucky loser
- Alt = Alternate
- ITF = ITF entry
- PR = Protected ranking
- SR = Special ranking
- SE = Special exempt
- JE = Junior exempt
- JR = Junior Accelerator Programme entrant
- CO = College Accelerator Programme entrant
- NG = Next Gen Accelerator Program entrant
- w/o = Walkover
- r = Retired
- d = Defaulted

=== Finals ===
Semifinals
7/WC	(Australia) Daria Kasatkina	6	6
WC	(Spain) Sara Sorribes Tormo	2	0
(Germany) Tamara Korpatsch	3	6	6
(Spain) Marina Bassols Ribera	6	0	4

Final
7/WC	(Australia) Daria Kasatkina	2	6	7
(Germany) Tamara Korpatsch	6	3	5

=== Top half ===
First round
1	(China) Xin Wang	6	6
(Spain) K Quevedo	3	0
A Charaeva	6	6
(Hungary) D Gálfi	4	2
(United States) V Lepchenko	6	5	3
Q	(Brazil) L Pigossi	3	7	6
(Colombia) E Arango	2	6	6^{5}
7/WC	(Australia) D Kasatkina	6	3	7^{7}
4	(Croatia) A Ružić	6	7^{7}
Q	(Argentina) V Bosio	1	6^{5}
(Australia) A Tomljanović	4	6	3
WC	(Spain) S Sorribes Tormo	6	2	6
WC	(Spain) A Mintegi del Olmo	6	5	3
(Switzerland) R Masarova	3	7	6
E Pridankina	6	6
6	(Uzbekistan) K Rakhimova	4	3

Second round
1	(China) Xin Wang	5	6	6^{1}
A Charaeva	7	3	7^{7}
Q	(Brazil) L Pigossi	2	2
7/WC	(Australia) D Kasatkina	6	6
4	(Croatia) A Ružić	6	3	4
WC	(Spain) S Sorribes Tormo	1	6	6
(Switzerland) R Masarova	6	2	1
E Pridankina	2	6	6

Quarterfinals
A Charaeva	6	0	4
7/WC	(Australia) D Kasatkina	4	6	6
WC	(Spain) S Sorribes Tormo	3	7	7
E Pridankina	6	5	5

Semifinals
7/WC	(Australia) D Kasatkina	6	6
WC	(Spain) S Sorribes Tormo	2	0

=== Bottom half ===
First round
8	O Selekhmeteva	2	4
(Slovakia) R Šramková	6	6
Q	(Germany) C Werner	6	4	6
Q	(Spain) C Martínez Círez	4	6	2
(Italy) L Stefanini	2	6^{4}
(Germany) T Korpatsch	6	7^{7}
(Switzerland) J Teichmann	7	6
3	(Spain) J Bouzas Maneiro	5	0
5	(Brazil) B Haddad Maia	6	7^{7}
(Spain) A Lázaro García	3	6^{5}
(United States) A Krueger	6	6^{3}	6
(Australia) S Hunter	2	7^{7}	1
(Spain) M Bassols Ribera	6	6
A Zakharova	3	0
WC	(Spain) A Bolsova	6	5	7^{7}
2	(United States) P Stearns	4	7	6^{4}

Second round
(Slovakia) R Šramková	5	6	1
Q	(Germany) C Werner	7	2	6
(Germany) T Korpatsch	6	6
(Switzerland) J Teichmann	3	2
5	(Brazil) B Haddad Maia	6^{6}	6	6
(United States) A Krueger	7^{8}	4	3
(Spain) M Bassols Ribera	6	7^{9}
WC	(Spain) A Bolsova	3	6^{7}

Quarterfinals
Q	(Germany) C Werner	1	1
(Germany) T Korpatsch	6	6
5	(Brazil) B Haddad Maia	2	1
(Spain) M Bassols Ribera	6	6

Semifinals
(Germany) T Korpatsch	3	6	6
(Spain) M Bassols Ribera	6	0	4

== Qualifying ==
=== Seeds ===
1. (Brazil) Laura Pigossi (qualified)
2. (Germany) Caroline Werner (qualified)
3. (Argentina) Victoria Bosio (qualified)
4. (Spain) Carlota Martínez Círez (qualified)

=== Qualifiers ===
1. (Brazil) Laura Pigossi
2. (Germany) Caroline Werner
3. (Argentina) Victoria Bosio
4. (Spain) Carlota Martínez Círez

=== Qualifying draw ===
==== First qualifier ====
Qualifying competition
1	(Brazil) Laura Pigossi	7	6
	(Spain) María Teixido García	5	4

==== Second qualifier ====
Qualifying competition
2	(Germany) Caroline Werner	6	6
WC	(Spain) Ruth Roura Llaverias	1	0

==== Third qualifier ====
Qualifying competition
3	(Argentina) Victoria Bosio	6	6
WC	(Spain) Martina Vázquez Valles	1	1

==== Fourth qualifier ====
Qualifying competition
4	(Spain) Carlota Martínez Círez	6	7
	Ekaterina Kazionova	2	5
