= 2024 Grand Prix SAR La Princesse Lalla Meryem =

- Date: 19 – 25 May
- Edition: 22nd
- Category: WTA 250
- Draw: 32S / 16D
- Prize money: $267,082
- Surface: Clay / outdoor
- Location: Rabat, Morocco
- Venue: Club des Cheminots

Champions

Singles
- (United States) Peyton Stearns

Doubles
- Irina Khromacheva / Yana Sizikova
- Morocco Open

The 2024 Grand Prix SAR La Princesse Lalla Meryem was a professional women's tennis tournament played on clay courts. It was the 22nd edition of the tournament and was part of the WTA 250 category of the 2024 WTA Tour. It took place in Rabat, Morocco, between 19 and 25 May 2024.

== Champions ==
=== Singles ===
- (United States) Peyton Stearns def. (Egypt) Mayar Sherif 6–2, 6–1

=== Doubles ===
- Irina Khromacheva / Yana Sizikova def. (Kazakhstan) Anna Danilina / (China) Xu Yifan, 6–3, 6–2

== Singles main draw entrants ==
=== Seeds ===
Country	Player	Rank^{1}	Seed
CHN	Yuan Yue	38	1
	Anna Blinkova	46	2
ESP	Sara Sorribes Tormo	47	3
ITA	Lucia Bronzetti	48	4
NED	Arantxa Rus	49	5
CHN	Wang Xiyu	53	6
ITA	Elisabetta Cocciaretto	56	7
CHN	Zhu Lin	57	8

- Rankings are as of 6 May 2024.

=== Other entrants ===
The following players received wildcards into the singles main draw:

- (Morocco) Malak El Allami
- (Morocco) Aya El Aouni
- (Morocco) Yasmine Kabbaj

The following players received entry from the qualifying draw:

- (Italy) Nuria Brancaccio
- (Turkey) Berfu Cengiz
- (Serbia) Aleksandra Krunić
- (Italy) Camilla Rosatello

=== Withdrawals ===
- (Canada) Bianca Andreescu → replaced by (Japan) Nao Hibino
- (Romania) Jaqueline Cristian → replaced by (United States) Peyton Stearns
- (Belgium) Greet Minnen → replaced by (United Kingdom) Harriet Dart

== Doubles main draw entrants ==
=== Seeds ===
Country	Player	Country	Player	Rank^{1}	Seed
CHN	Guo Hanyu	CHN	Jiang Xinyu	88	1
KAZ	Anna Danilina	CHN	Xu Yifan	94	2
JPN	Eri Hozumi	JPN	Makoto Ninomiya	99	3
	Irina Khromacheva		Yana Sizikova	118	4

- ^{1} Rankings as of 6 May 2024.

=== Other entrants ===
The following pairs received wildcards into the doubles main draw:

- (Morocco) Malak El Allami / (Morocco) Aya El Aouni
- (Morocco) Yasmine Kabbaj / Ekaterina Yashina

The following pairs received entry as alternates:

- (United Kingdom) Harriet Dart / (China) Wang Xiyu
- (Colombia) Camila Osorio / (United States) Sabrina Santamaria

=== Withdrawals ===
- Elina Avanesyan / (Spain) Sara Sorribes Tormo → replaced by (Colombia) Camila Osorio / (United States) Sabrina Santamaria
- (Hungary) Fanny Stollár / (United States) Taylor Townsend → replaced by (United Kingdom) Harriet Dart / (China) Wang Xiyu
