= 2026 Catalonia Open Solgironès – Doubles =

Doubles
- 2026 Catalonia Open Solgironès

Final
- Champions: Elena Pridankina (China) Tang Qianhui
- Runners-up: (Slovakia) Tereza Mihalíková (United Kingdom) Olivia Nicholls
- Score: 6–1, 6–3

Events
Singles	Doubles
- Catalonia Open

Bianca Andreescu and Aldila Sutjiadi were the defending champions, but did not participate this year.

Elena Pridankina and Tang Qianhui won the doubles title at the 2026 Catalonia Open Solgironès, defeating Tereza Mihalíková and Olivia Nicholls in the final, 6–1, 6–3.

== Seeds ==
1. (Australia) Storm Hunter / (New Zealand) Erin Routliffe (quarterfinals)
2. (Slovakia) Tereza Mihalíková / (United Kingdom) Olivia Nicholls (final)

== Draw ==
Key

- Q = Qualifier
- WC = Wild card
- LL = Lucky loser
- Alt = Alternate
- ITF = ITF entry
- PR = Protected ranking
- SR = Special ranking
- SE = Special exempt
- JE = Junior exempt
- JR = Junior Accelerator Programme entrant
- CO = College Accelerator Programme entrant
- NG = Next Gen Accelerator Program entrant
- w/o = Walkover
- r = Retired
- d = Defaulted

=== Draw ===
Quarterfinals
1	(Australia) S Hunter (New Zealand) E Routliffe	6^{3}	6	[4]
E Pridankina (China) Q Tang	7^{7}	2	[10]
(Slovenia) A Klepač; M Kozyreva	6	6
(China) Xin Wang (China) S Zheng	4	1
(Argentina) N Fossa Huergo (Japan) M Ninomiya	3	7	[10]
(Spain) Y Cavallé Reimers (Brazil) L Pigossi	6	5	[2]
WC	(Spain) M Bassols Ribera (Spain) A Bolsova	3	5
2	(Slovakia) T Mihalíková (United Kingdom) O Nicholls	6	7

Semifinals
E Pridankina (China) Q Tang	6	3	[10]
(Slovenia) A Klepač; M Kozyreva	2	6	[4]
(Argentina) N Fossa Huergo (Japan) M Ninomiya	1	6	[7]
2	(Slovakia) T Mihalíková (United Kingdom) O Nicholls	6	3	[10]

Final
E Pridankina (China) Q Tang	6	6
2	(Slovakia) T Mihalíková (United Kingdom) O Nicholls	1	3
