= 2024 Catalonia Open – Doubles =

Doubles
- 2024 Catalonia Open

Final
- Champions: (United States) Nicole Melichar-Martinez (Australia) Ellen Perez
- Runners-up: (Poland) Katarzyna Piter (Egypt) Mayar Sherif
- Score: 7–5, 6–2

Details
- Draw: 16
- Seeds: 4

Events
Singles	Doubles
- Catalonia Open

Storm Hunter and Ellen Perez were the reigning champions, but Hunter did not participate this year.

Perez partnered Nicole Melichar-Martinez and successfully defended her title, defeating Katarzyna Piter and Mayar Sherif in the final, 7–5, 6–2.

== Seeds ==
1. (United States) Nicole Melichar-Martinez / (Australia) Ellen Perez (champions)
2. (United States) Asia Muhammad / (Indonesia) Aldila Sutjiadi (first round)
3. (Kazakhstan) Anna Danilina / (Estonia) Ingrid Neel (semifinals)
4. (Japan) Eri Hozumi / (Japan) Makoto Ninomiya (first round)

== Draw ==
Key

- Q = Qualifier
- WC = Wild card
- LL = Lucky loser
- Alt = Alternate
- ITF = ITF entry
- PR = Protected ranking
- SR = Special ranking
- SE = Special exempt
- JE = Junior exempt
- JR = Junior Accelerator Programme entrant
- CO = College Accelerator Programme entrant
- NG = Next Gen Accelerator Program entrant
- w/o = Walkover
- r = Retired
- d = Defaulted

=== Draw ===
First round
1	(United States) N Melichar-Martinez (Australia) E Perez	6	6
(Colombia) C Osorio (China) S Zhang	2	3
(United Kingdom) M Lumsden (Brazil) I Martins	6	6
WC	(Spain) I Burillo Escorihuela (Spain) G Maristany	2	3
3	(Kazakhstan) A Danilina (Estonia) I Neel	7^{7}	6
(United States) H Baptiste (United States) A Parks	6^{0}	4
(France) E Lechemia (Germany) J Lohoff	2	6	[8]
Alt	(Japan) N Hibino (Chinese Taipei) F-h Wu	6	4	[10]
(United Kingdom) A Barnett (United Kingdom) F Christie	3	5
L Marozava; K Rakhimova	6	7
(Czech Republic) M Kolodziejová (Czech Republic) A Sisková	4	6	[11]
4	(Japan) E Hozumi (Japan) M Ninomiya	6	4	[9]
(Romania) A Bogdan (Netherlands) A Rus	6	6
(Ukraine) M Kolb (Ukraine) N Kolb	2	2
(Poland) K Piter (Egypt) M Sherif	6	6
2	(United States) A Muhammad (Indonesia) A Sutjiadi	2	4

Quarterfinals
1	(United States) N Melichar-Martinez (Australia) E Perez	6	6
(United Kingdom) M Lumsden (Brazil) I Martins	3	1
3	(Kazakhstan) A Danilina (Estonia) I Neel	6	6
Alt	(Japan) N Hibino (Chinese Taipei) F-h Wu	3	3
L Marozava; K Rakhimova	5	6	[10]
(Czech Republic) M Kolodziejová (Czech Republic) A Sisková	7	3	[2]
(Romania) A Bogdan (Netherlands) A Rus	4	2
(Poland) K Piter (Egypt) M Sherif	6	6

Semifinals
1	(United States) N Melichar-Martinez (Australia) E Perez	6	4	[12]
3	(Kazakhstan) A Danilina (Estonia) I Neel	2	6	[10]
L Marozava; K Rakhimova	5	7	[6]
(Poland) K Piter (Egypt) M Sherif	7	5	[10]

Final
1	(United States) N Melichar-Martinez (Australia) E Perez	7	6
(Poland) K Piter (Egypt) M Sherif	5	2
