= Natela Dzalamidze =

Georgian tennis player (born 1993)

Natela Dzalamidze ნათელა ძალამიძე Натела Дзаламидзе
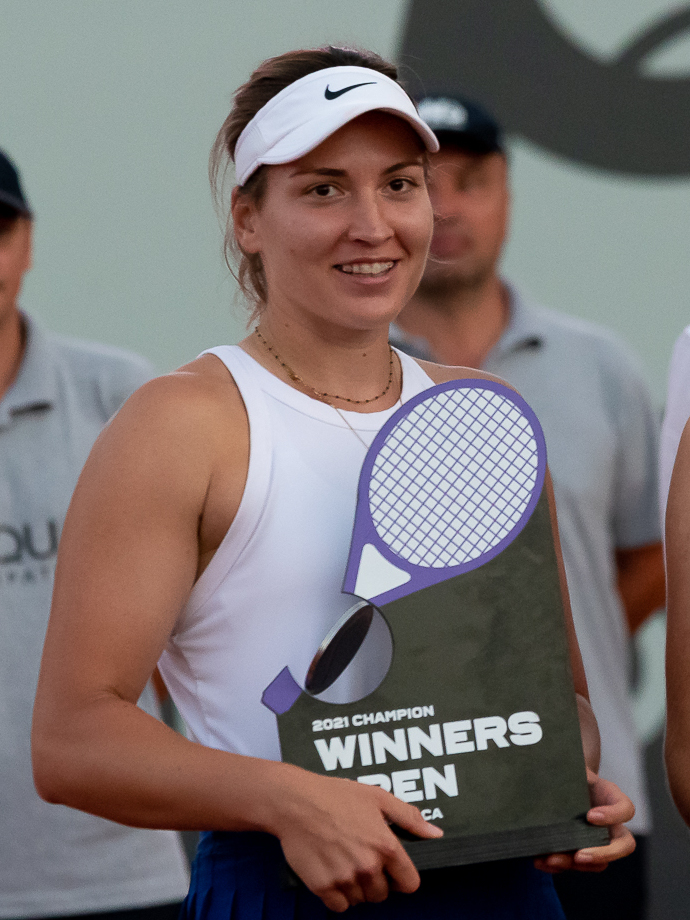
- Dzalamidze at the 2021 Winners Open
- Country (sports): Georgia (2022–); Russia (2015–2022)
- Residence: Moscow, Russia
- Born: 27 February 1993 (age 33) Moscow
- Turned pro: 2009
- Plays: Right (two-handed backhand)
- Prize money: $485,244

Singles
- Career record: 213–144
- Career titles: 10 ITF
- Highest ranking: No. 245 (16 November 2015)

Doubles
- Career record: 365–261
- Career titles: 3 WTA, 3 WTA Challengers
- Highest ranking: No. 43 (16 May 2022)

Grand Slam doubles results
- Australian Open: 1R (2018, 2022, 2023)
- French Open: 2R (2019)
- Wimbledon: 2R (2017, 2022)
- US Open: 1R (2017, 2018, 2019, 2020, 2022)

Grand Slam mixed doubles results
- French Open: 1R (2022)
- Wimbledon: 1R (2022)

Natela Georgiyevna Dzalamidze (Russian: Натела Георгиевна Дзаламидзе, Georgian: ნათელა ძალამიძე, pronounced [natʰala dzalamidze]; born 27 February 1993) is a Russian-born former Georgian tennis player. On 16 May 2022, she reached a career-high doubles ranking of world No. 43. Dzalamidze won three doubles titles on WTA Tour and also three WTA Challenger doubles titles, with ten singles and 29 doubles titles on the ITF Women's Circuit. On 16 November 2015, she reached her best singles ranking of No. 245.

== Nationality change ==
She began representing Georgia, where her father is from, in international competition in June 2022 in order to be able to compete at Wimbledon and the Olympics.

== Career ==
Dzalamidze made her WTA Tour main-draw debut at the 2015 Nürnberger Versicherungscup in Germany, in the doubles draw partnering Sviatlana Pirazhenka.

In 2021, she won her first two doubles titles at the Romanian Open in October and the Linz Open in November, partnering Kaja Juvan and Kamilla Rakhimova respectively.

Two years later in 2023, Dzalamidze won the Ladies Linz doubles title for the second time, partnering with Viktória Kužmová defeating Anna-Lena Friedsam and Nadiia Kichenok in the final.

== Performance timelines ==
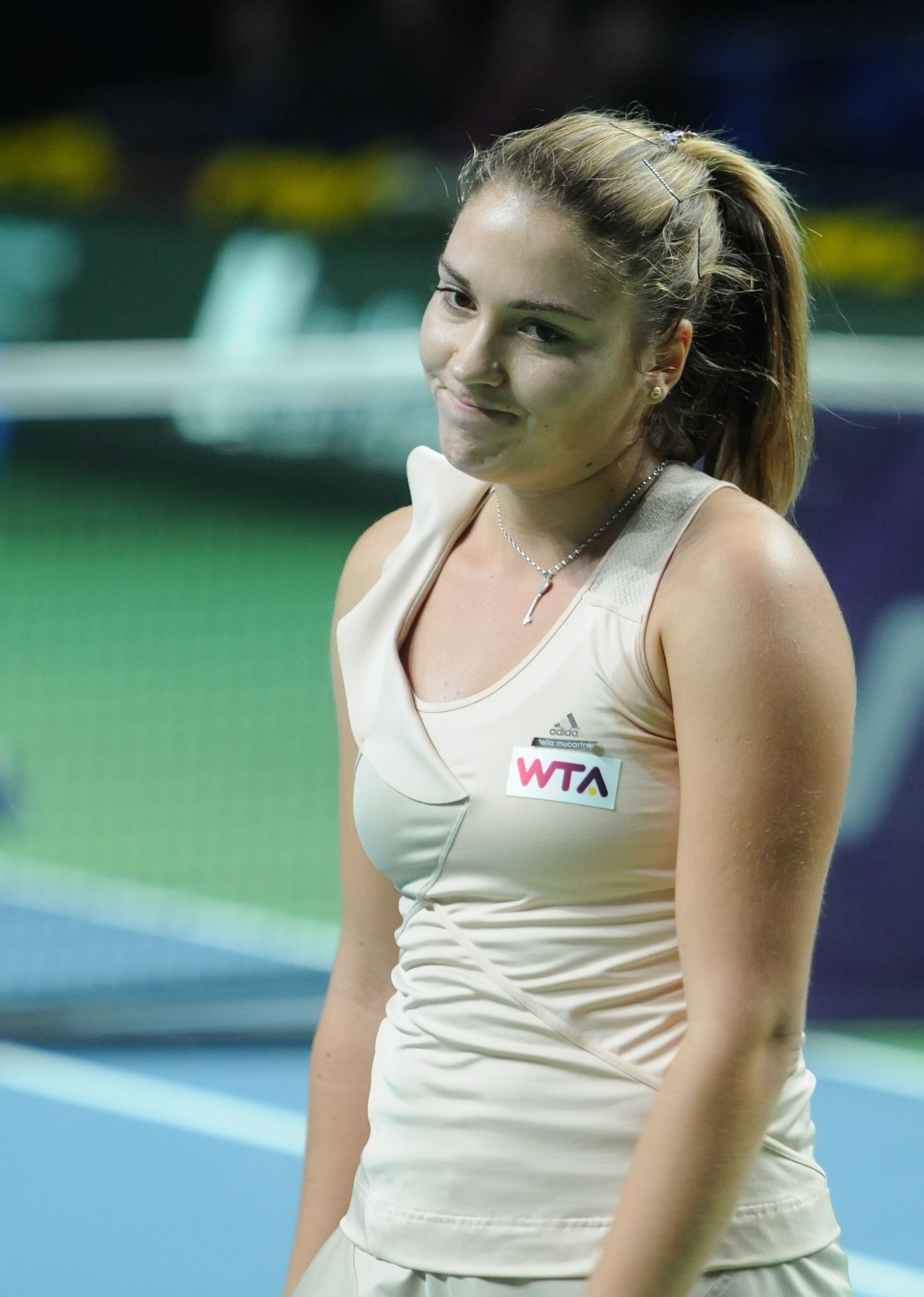
Natela Dzalamidze in 2014

Key
W	F	SF	QF	#R	RR	Q#	DNQ	A	NH

(W) winner; (F) finalist; (SF) semifinalist; (QF) quarterfinalist; (#R) rounds 4, 3, 2, 1; (RR) round-robin stage; (Q#) qualification round; (DNQ) did not qualify; (A) absent; (NH) not held; (SR) strike rate (events won / competed); (W–L) win–loss record.
To avoid confusion and double counting, these charts are updated at the conclusion of a tournament or when the player's participation has ended.

Only main-draw results in WTA Tour, Grand Slam tournaments, Fed Cup/Billie Jean King Cup and Olympic Games are included in win–loss records.

=== Doubles ===
Tournament	2015	2016	2017	2018	2019	2020	2021	2022	2023	SR	W–L
Grand Slam tournaments
Australian Open	A	A	A	1R	A	A	A	1R	1R	0 / 3	0–3
French Open	A	A	1R	A	2R	A	A	1R	1R	0 / 4	1–4
Wimbledon	A	A	2R	Q1	1R	NH	A	2R	1R	0 / 4	2–4
US Open	A	A	1R	1R	1R	1R	A	1R	A	0 / 5	0–5
Win–loss	0–0	0–0	1–3	0–2	1–3	0–1	0–0	1–4	0–3	0 / 16	3–16
WTA 1000
Dubai / Qatar Open (Note: The first Premier 5 event of the year has switched back and forth between the Dubai Tennis Championships and the Qatar Ladies Open since 2009. Dubai was classified as a Premier 5 event from 2009 to 2011 before being succeeded by Doha for the 2012–2014 period. In 2015, Dubai regained its Premier 5 status while Doha was demoted to Premier status. The Premier 5 tournaments were reclassified as WTA 1000 tournaments in 2021.)	A	A	1R	A	A	A	1R	2R	A	0 / 3	1–3
Indian Wells	A	A	A	A	A	NH	A	1R	A	0 / 1	0–1
Miami Open	A	A	A	A	A	NH	A	1R	A	0 / 1	0–1
Madrid Open	A	A	A	A	A	NH	A	1R	A	0 / 1	0–1
Italian Open	A	A	A	A	A	A	A	1R	A	0 / 1	0–1
Canadian Open	A	A	A	A	A	NH	A	A	A	0 / 0	0–0
Cincinnati Open	A	A	A	A	A	A	A	1R	A	0 / 1	0–1
Career statistics
Tournaments	2	4	15	16	8	5	13	25	6	Career total: 94	
Titles	0	0	0	0	0	0	2	0	1	Career total: 3	
Finals	0	0	1	0	0	0	3	2	1	Career total: 7	
Overall win–loss	1–2	4–4	11–15	10–15	2–8	2–5	16–12	15–25	7–3	3 / 94	68–89
Year-end ranking	185	103	59	94	165	146	59	62	102	$421,331	

== WTA Tour finals ==
=== Doubles: 7 (3 titles, 4 runner-ups) ===
Legend WTA 500 (–) WTA 250 (3–4)	Finals by surface Hard (2–2) Clay (1–2)

Result	W–L	Date	Tournament	Tier	Surface	Partner	Opponents	Score
Loss	0–1	Oct 2017	Ladies Linz, Austria	International (Note: The WTA International tournaments were reclassified as WTA 250 tournaments in 2021.)	Hard (i)	(Switzerland) Xenia Knoll	(Netherlands) Kiki Bertens (Sweden) Johanna Larsson	6–3, 3–6, [4–10]
Loss	0–2	Jul 2021	Palermo Ladies Open, Italy	WTA 250	Clay	(Russia) Kamilla Rakhimova	(New Zealand) Erin Routliffe (Belgium) Kimberley Zimmermann	6–7^{(5–7)}, 6–4, [4–10]
Win	1–2	Aug 2021	Cluj-Napoca Open, Romania	WTA 250	Clay	(Slovenia) Kaja Juvan	(Poland) Katarzyna Piter (Egypt) Mayar Sherif	6–3, 6–4
Win	2–2	Nov 2021	Ladies Linz, Austria	WTA 250	Hard (i)	(Russia) Kamilla Rakhimova	(China) Wang Xinyu (China) Zheng Saisai	6–4, 6–2
Loss	2–3	Apr 2022	İstanbul Cup, Turkey	WTA 250	Clay	Kamilla Rakhimova	(Czech Republic) Marie Bouzková (Spain) Sara Sorribes Tormo	3–6, 4–6
Loss	2–4	Sep 2022	Chennai Open, India	WTA 250	Hard	Anna Blinkova	(Canada) Gabriela Dabrowski (Brazil) Luisa Stefani	1–6, 2–6
Win	3–4	Feb 2023	Ladies Linz, Austria (2)	WTA 250	Hard (i)	(Slovakia) Viktória Kužmová	(Germany) Anna-Lena Friedsam (Ukraine) Nadiia Kichenok	4–6, 7–5, [12–10]

== WTA Challenger finals ==
=== Doubles: 4 (3 titles, 1 runner-up) ===
Result	W–L	Date	Tournament	Surface	Partner	Opponents	Score
Win	1–0	Nov 2016	Taipei Open, Taiwan	Carpet (i)	(Russia) Veronika Kudermetova	(Chinese Taipei) Chang Kai-chen (Chinese Taipei) Chuang Chia-jung	4–6, 6–3, [10–5]
Win	2–0	Nov 2018	Mumbai Open, India	Hard	(Russia) Veronika Kudermetova	(Netherlands) Bibiane Schoofs (Czech Republic) Barbora Štefková	6–4, 7–6^{(7–4)}
Loss	2–1	Nov 2018	Taipei Open, Taiwan	Carpet (i)	(Russia) Olga Doroshina	(India) Ankita Raina (India) Karman Thandi	3–6, 7–5, [12–12] ret.
Win	3–1	Oct 2022	Open de Rouen, France	Hard (i)	(Russia) Kamilla Rakhimova	(Japan) Misaki Doi (Georgia (country)) Oksana Kalashnikova	6–2, 7–5

== ITF Circuit finals ==
=== Singles: 16 (10 titles, 6 runner-ups) ===
Legend $60,000 tournaments $25,000 tournaments $10,000 tournaments	Finals by surface Hard (6–4) Clay (4–1) Carpet (0–1)

Result	W–L	Date	Tournament	Tier	Surface	Opponent	Score
Win	1–0	Jan 2009	ITF Hyderabad, India	10,000	Clay	(Russia) Anna Rapoport	1–6, 6–2, 6–4
Win	2–0	Feb 2012	ITF Sharm El Sheikh, Egypt	10,000	Hard	(Austria) Barbara Haas	6–3, 6–7^{(3)}, 6–0
Loss	2–1	Feb 2012	ITF Sharm El Sheikh	10,000	Hard	(Russia) Ksenia Kirillova	5–7, 4–6
Win	3–1	Feb 2013	ITF Netanya, Israel	10,000	Hard	(Russia) Polina Leykina	6–4, 6–3
Loss	3–2	Mar 2013	ITF Sharm El Sheikh	10,000	Hard	(Austria) Melanie Klaffner	1–6, 0–6
Loss	3–3	Nov 2013	ITF Sharm El Sheikh	10,000	Hard	(Italy) Giulia Bruzzone	3–6, 6–1, 4–6
Win	4–3	Dec 2013	ITF Antalya, Turkey	10,000	Clay	(Ukraine) Alyona Sotnikova	2–6, 7–6^{(5)}, 6–3
Loss	4–4	Jan 2014	ITF Kaarst, Germany	10,000	Carpet (i)	(Slovenia) Nastja Kolar	6–4, 1–6, 4–6
Win	5–4	May 2014	ITF Zielona Góra, Poland	10,000	Clay	(Germany) Justine Ozga	7–6^{(5)}, 6–4
Win	6–4	Aug 2014	Tatarstan Open, Russia	10,000	Hard	(Russia) Marta Paigina	6–2, 6–2
Win	7–4	Nov 2014	ITF Sousse, Tunisia	10,000	Hard	(France) Sherazad Reix	7–6^{(7)}, 6–1
Loss	7–5	Dec 2014	ITF Navi Mumbai, India	25,000	Hard	(Serbia) Nina Stojanović	6–3, 1–6, 4–6
Loss	7–6	May 2015	ITF Zielona Góra, Poland	10,000	Clay	(Czech Republic) Markéta Vondroušová	3–6, 3–6
Win	8–6	Jul 2015	ITF Maaseik, Belgium	10,000	Clay	(Argentina) Catalina Pella	6–1, 5–7, 6–1
Win	9–6	Aug 2015	President's Cup, Kazakhstan	25,000	Hard	(Russia) Ksenia Pervak	6–6 ret.
Win	10–6	Nov 2016	ITF Hua Hin, Thailand	10,000	Hard	(Thailand) Nudnida Luangnam	6–1, 6–3

=== Doubles: 50 (29 titles, 21 runner-ups) ===
Legend $100,000 tournaments $50/60,000 tournaments $25,000 tournaments $10/15,000 tournaments	Finals by surface Hard (16–12) Clay (13–8) Grass (0–1)

Result	W–L	Date	Tournament	Tier	Surface	Partner	Opponents	Score
Win	1–0	Jun 2010	ITF Qarshi, Uzbekistan	25,000	Hard	(Russia) Daria Kuchmina	(Belarus) Ksenia Milevskaya (Ukraine) Ganna Piven	6–2, 2–6, [11–9]
Win	2–0	Jul 2011	ITF Darmstadt, Germany	25,000	Clay	(Germany) Anna Zaja	(Czech Republic) Hana Birnerová (Czech Republic) Karolína Plíšková	7–5, 2–6, [10–6]
Loss	2–1	Dec 2011	Siberia Cup, Russia	50,000	Hard (i)	(Russia) Margarita Gasparyan	(Belarus) Darya Kustova (Ukraine) Olga Savchuk	0–6, 2–6
Win	3–1	Feb 2012	ITF Sharm El Sheikh, Egypt	10,000	Hard	(Ukraine) Khristina Kazimova	(Spain) Rocío de la Torre Sánchez (Germany) Christina Shakovets	6–4, 7–5
Loss	3–2	Feb 2012	ITF Sharm El Sheikh	10,000	Hard	(Ukraine) Khristina Kazimova	(Croatia) Indire Akiki (Ukraine) Anastasia Kharchenko	3–6, 3–6
Win	4–2	Feb 2012	ITF Sharm El Sheikh	10,000	Hard	(Ukraine) Khristina Kazimova	(Russia) Sofia Dmitrieva (Russia) Polina Leykina	6–0, 7–6^{(4)}
Win	5–2	Mar 2012	ITF Phuket, Thailand	25,000	Hard	(Russia) Marta Sirotkina	(Chinese Taipei) Chan Chin-wei (China) Zheng Saisai	6–4, 6–1
Win	6–2	Jul 2012	ITF Vienna, Austria	10,000	Clay	(Ukraine) Anna Shkudun	(Germany) Christina Shakovets (Ukraine) Sofiya Kovalets	6–4, 7–5
Loss	6–3	Aug 2012	Ladies Open Hechingen, Germany	25,000	Clay	(Czech Republic) Renata Voráčová	(Bosnia and Herzegovina) Mervana Jugić-Salkić (Austria) Sandra Klemenschits	2–6, 3–6
Loss	6–4	Feb 2013	ITF Netanya, Israel	10,000	Hard	(Russia) Aminat Kushkhova	(Ukraine) Oleksandra Korashvili (Russia) Polina Leykina	4–6, 2–6
Loss	6–5	Mar 2013	ITF Netanya, Israel	10,000	Hard	(Russia) Aminat Kushkhova	(Russia) Polina Leykina (Belarus) Aliaksandra Sasnovich	6–2, 6–7^{(4)}, [8–10]
Win	7–5	Jun 2013	ITF Guimarães, Portugal	10,000	Clay	(Spain) Arabela Fernandez Rabener	(Switzerland) Tess Sugnaux (Portugal) Rita Vilaça	3–6, 6–3, [10–3]
Win	8–5	Jul 2013	ITF Darmstadt, Germany	25,000	Clay	(Russia) Alexandra Artamonova	(Slovenia) Maša Zec Peškirič (Germany) Christina Shakovets	6–3, 7–6^{(5)}
Win	9–5	Nov 2013	ITF Sharm El Sheikh, Egypt	10,000	Hard	(Ukraine) Khristina Kazimova	(Romania) Elena-Teodora Cadar (Spain) Arabela Fernandez Rabener	6–4, 6–3
Loss	9–6	Nov 2013	ITF Sharm El Sheikh	10,000	Hard	(Ukraine) Yuliya Hnateyko	(United Kingdom) Katie Boulter (Belgium) Justine De Sutter	4–6, 6–7^{(6)}
Win	10–6	Dec 2013	ITF Antalya, Turkey	10,000	Clay	(Ukraine) Khristina Kazimova	(Czech Republic) Nikola Horaková (Netherlands) Gabriela van de Graaf	6–1, 6–0
Loss	10–7	Mar 2014	ITF Shenzhen, China	10,000	Hard	(Russia) Polina Leykina	(South Korea) Han Na-lae (South Korea) Yoo Mi	1–6, 1–6
Loss	10–8	Apr 2014	ITF Heraklion, Greece	10,000	Hard	(Greece) Valentini Grammatikopoulou	(Belgium) Magali Kempen (Belgium) Elke Lemmens	6–1, 5–7, [8–10]
Win	11–8	Apr 2014	ITF Heraklion, Greece	10,000	Hard	(Greece) Valentini Grammatikopoulou	(Greece) Despina Papamichail (Greece) Maria Sakkari	6–7^{(6)}, 6–3, [10–5]
Win	12–8	May 2014	ITF Zielona Góra, Poland	10,000	Clay	(Poland) Natalia Siedliska	(Romania) Ana Bianca Mihăilă (Belarus) Sviatlana Pirazhenka	6–4, 6–1
Win	13–8	Jun 2014	ITF Breda, Netherlands	15,000	Clay	(Belarus) Sviatlana Pirazhenka	(Netherlands) Demi Schuurs (Netherlands) Eva Wacanno	6–4, 6–1
Loss	13–9	Jun 2014	ITF Brussels, Belgium	10,000	Clay	(Romania) Diana Buzean	(Italy) Alice Matteucci (Italy) Camilla Rosatello	4–6, 6–3, [3–10]
Loss	13–10	Aug 2014	Neva Cup, Russia	25,000	Clay	(Russia) Anastasia Pivovarova	(Russia) Vitalia Diatchenko (Belarus) Ilona Kremen	1–6, 3–6
Win	14–10	Aug 2014	Tatarstan Open, Russia	10,000	Hard	(Russia) Alena Tarasova	(Russia) Kseniia Bekker (Russia) Anastasia Frolova	6–1, 6–1
Win	15–10	Nov 2014	ITF Sousse, Tunisia	10,000	Hard	(Austria) Janina Toljan	(United Kingdom) Francesca Stephenson (Netherlands) Mandy Wagemaker	6–2, 6–1
Win	16–10	Nov 2014	ITF Sousse, Tunisia	10,000	Hard	(Ukraine) Oleksandra Korashvili	(United Kingdom) Harriet Dart (United Kingdom) Francesca Stephenson	6–3, 6–1
Win	17–10	Nov 2014	ITF Sousse, Tunisia	10,000	Hard	(Ukraine) Oleksandra Korashvili	(Bosnia and Herzegovina) Dea Herdželaš (Bosnia and Herzegovina) Jelena Simić	6–3, 6–1
Loss	17–11	Feb 2015	ITF Moscow, Russia	25,000	Hard (i)	(Russia) Veronika Kudermetova	(Belarus) Lidziya Marozava (Ukraine) Anastasiya Vasylyeva	4–6, 4–6
Loss	17–12	May 2015	ITF Zielona Góra, Poland	10,000	Clay	(Russia) Margarita Lazareva	(Czech Republic) Miriam Kolodziejová (Czech Republic) Markéta Vondroušová	2–6, 2–6
Win	18–12	Aug 2015	President's Cup, Kazakhstan	25,000	Hard	(Russia) Alena Tarasova	(Turkey) Başak Eraydın (Kyrgyzstan) Ksenia Palkina	6–0, 6–1
Win	19–12	Aug 2015	ITF Moscow, Russia	25,000	Clay	(Russia) Veronika Kudermetova	(Ukraine) Oleksandra Korashvili (Ukraine) Valeriya Strakhova	6–3, 6–3
Loss	19–13	Aug 2015	Neva Cup, Russia	25,000	Clay	(Russia) Veronika Kudermetova	(Germany) Carolin Daniels (Belarus) Lidziya Marozava	4–6, 6–4, [6–10]
Win	20–13	Sep 2015	Batumi Ladies Open, Georgia	25,000	Hard	(Russia) Alena Tarasova	(Russia) Angelina Gabueva (Ukraine) Elizaveta Ianchuk	5–7, 6–1, [10–7]
Loss	20–14	Nov 2015	Bendigo International, Australia	50,000	Hard	(Japan) Hiroko Kuwata	(United States) Lauren Embree (United States) Asia Muhammad	5–7, 3–6
Win	21–14	Jan 2016	ITF Daytona Beach, United States	25,000	Clay	(Russia) Veronika Kudermetova	(Canada) Sharon Fichman (Canada) Carol Zhao	6–4, 6–3
Loss	21–15	Jan 2016	ITF Wesley Chapel, US	25,000	Clay	(Russia) Veronika Kudermetova	(United States) Ingrid Neel (Russia) Natalia Vikhlyantseva	6–4, 6–7^{(4)}, [6–10]
Loss	21–16	Feb 2016	ITF New Delhi, India	25,000	Hard	(Russia) Veronika Kudermetova	(Chinese Taipei) Hsu Ching-wen (Chinese Taipei) Lee Ya-hsuan	0–6, 6–0, [6–10]
Win	22–16	Apr 2016	ITF Qarshi, Uzbekistan	25,000	Hard	(Russia) Veronika Kudermetova	(Russia) Ksenia Lykina (Russia) Polina Monova	4–6, 6–4, [10–7]
Win	23–16	Jun 2016	ITF Moscow, Russia	25,000	Hard	(Russia) Veronika Kudermetova	(Russia) Anna Morgina (Ukraine) Ganna Poznikhirenko	6–1, 6–2
Win	24–16	Jul 2016	Reinert Open, Germany	50,000	Clay	(Ukraine) Valeriya Strakhova	(Japan) Kanae Hisami (Japan) Kotomi Takahata	6–2, 6–1
NP (Note: doubles final cancelled after the 2016 Turkish coup d'état attempt)	––	Jul 2016	Bursa Cup, Turkey	50,000	Clay	(Uzbekistan) Akgul Amanmuradova	(Georgia (country)) Ekaterine Gorgodze (Georgia (country)) Sofia Shapatava	cancelled
Win	25–16	Jul 2016	President's Cup, Kazakhstan (2)	25,000	Hard	(Russia) Veronika Kudermetova	(Russia) Polina Monova (Russia) Yana Sizikova	6–2, 6–3
Win	26–16	Sep 2016	Telavi Open, Georgia	25,000	Clay	(Russia) Veronika Kudermetova	(Georgia (country)) Tatia Mikadze (Georgia (country)) Sofia Shapatava	6–4, 6–2
Win	27–16	Jun 2017	Open de Marseille, France	100k	Clay	(Russia) Veronika Kudermetova	(Hungary) Dalma Gálfi (Slovenia) Dalila Jakupović	7–6^{(5)}, 6–4
Win	28–16	Jul 2017	President's Cup, Kazakhstan (3)	100k	Hard	(Russia) Veronika Kudermetova	(Belgium) Ysaline Bonaventure (United Kingdom) Naomi Broady	6–2, 6–0
Loss	28–17	Jun 2018	Ilkley Trophy, United Kingdom	100k	Grass	(Kazakhstan) Galina Voskoboeva	(United States) Asia Muhammad (United States) Maria Sanchez	6–4, 3–6, [1–10]
Win	29–17	Jun 2019	Macha Lake Open, Czech Republic	W60	Clay	(Serbia) Nina Stojanović	(Japan) Kyōka Okamura (Serbia) Dejana Radanović	6–3, 6–3
Loss	29–18	Jan 2020	ITF Kazan, Russia	W25	Hard (i)	(Russia) Yana Sizikova	(Russia) Ekaterina Yashina (Russia) Anastasia Zakharova	2–6, 4–6
Loss	29–19	Feb 2020	ITF Moscow, Russia	W25	Hard (i)	(Greece) Valentini Grammatikopoulou	(Russia) Sofya Lansere (Russia) Kamilla Rakhimova	1–6, 6–3, [6–10]
Loss	29–20	Apr 2021	ITF Oeiras, Portugal	W25	Clay	(Russia) Sofya Lansere	(Netherlands) Suzan Lamens (Russia) Marina Melnikova	3–6, 1–6
Loss	29–21	Nov 2023	Open de Valencia, Spain	W100	Clay	(Spain) Aliona Bolsova	(Greece) Valentini Grammatikopoulou (Romania) Andreea Mitu	5–7, 4–6
