= 2021 Winners Open – Doubles =

Doubles
- 2021 Winners Open

Final
- Champions: (Russia) Natela Dzalamidze (Slovenia) Kaja Juvan
- Runners-up: (Poland) Katarzyna Piter (Egypt) Mayar Sherif
- Score: 6–3, 6–4

Events
Singles	Doubles
Winners Open

This was the first edition of the tournament.

Natela Dzalamidze and Kaja Juvan won the title, defeating Katarzyna Piter and Mayar Sherif in the final, 6–3, 6–4. This was the maiden WTA Tour doubles title for both Dzalamidze and Juvan.

== Seeds ==
1. (Slovakia) Viktória Kužmová / (Poland) Alicja Rosolska (first round)
2. (Serbia) Aleksandra Krunić / (Belarus) Lidziya Marozava (first round)
3. (Spain) Lara Arruabarrena / (Romania) Andreea Mitu (first round)
4. (Georgia (country)) Oksana Kalashnikova / (Slovakia) Tereza Mihalíková (first round)

== Draw ==
=== Key ===
- Q = Qualifier
- WC = Wild card
- LL = Lucky loser
- Alt = Alternate
- SE = Special exempt
- PR = Protected ranking
- ITF = ITF entry
- JE = Junior exempt
- w/o = Walkover
- r = Retired
- d = Defaulted
- SR = Special ranking

=== Draw ===
First round
1	(Slovakia) V Kužmová (Poland) A Rosolska	2	2
PR	(Russia) A Panova (Germany) J Wachaczyk	6	6
WC	(Romania) A Bogdan (Romania) J Cristian	6^{3}	6	[11]
(Romania) I Bara (Romania) M Buzărnescu	7^{7}	2	[9]
3	(Spain) L Arruabarrena (Romania) A Mitu	4	4
(Russia) A Fomina (Russia) E Yashina	6	6
(Russia) N Dzalamidze (Slovenia) K Juvan	6	3	[11]
WC	(Romania) M Bulgaru (Romania) I Fetecău	2	6	[9]
(Greece) V Grammatikopoulou (Belgium) K Zimmermann	1	3
(Hungary) A Bondár (Norway) U Eikeri	6	6
(Romania) OG Simion (Romania) G Talabă	6	6
4	(Georgia (country)) O Kalashnikova (Slovakia) T Mihalíková	3	4
(Romania) E Bogdan (Bulgaria) I Shinikova	1	6^{5}
(Poland) K Kawa (Czech Republic) R Voráčová	6	7^{7}
(Poland) K Piter (Egypt) M Sherif	7	6
2	(Serbia) A Krunić (Belarus) L Marozava	5	4

Quarterfinals
PR	(Russia) A Panova (Germany) J Wachaczyk	7^{11}	6
WC	(Romania) A Bogdan (Romania) J Cristian	6^{9}	1
(Russia) A Fomina (Russia) E Yashina	6	1	[3]
(Russia) N Dzalamidze (Slovenia) K Juvan	2	6	[10]
(Hungary) A Bondár (Norway) U Eikeri	6	6
(Romania) OG Simion (Romania) G Talabă	3	4
(Poland) K Kawa (Czech Republic) R Voráčová	2	4
(Poland) K Piter (Egypt) M Sherif	6	6

Semifinals
PR	(Russia) A Panova (Germany) J Wachaczyk	6^{4}	3
(Russia) N Dzalamidze (Slovenia) K Juvan	7^{7}	6
(Hungary) A Bondár (Norway) U Eikeri	6^{2}	3
(Poland) K Piter (Egypt) M Sherif	7^{7}	6

Final
(Russia) N Dzalamidze (Slovenia) K Juvan	6	6
(Poland) K Piter (Egypt) M Sherif	3	4
