= Mayar Sherif =

Egyptian tennis player (born 1996)

Mayar Sherif ميار شريف أحمد عبد العزيز
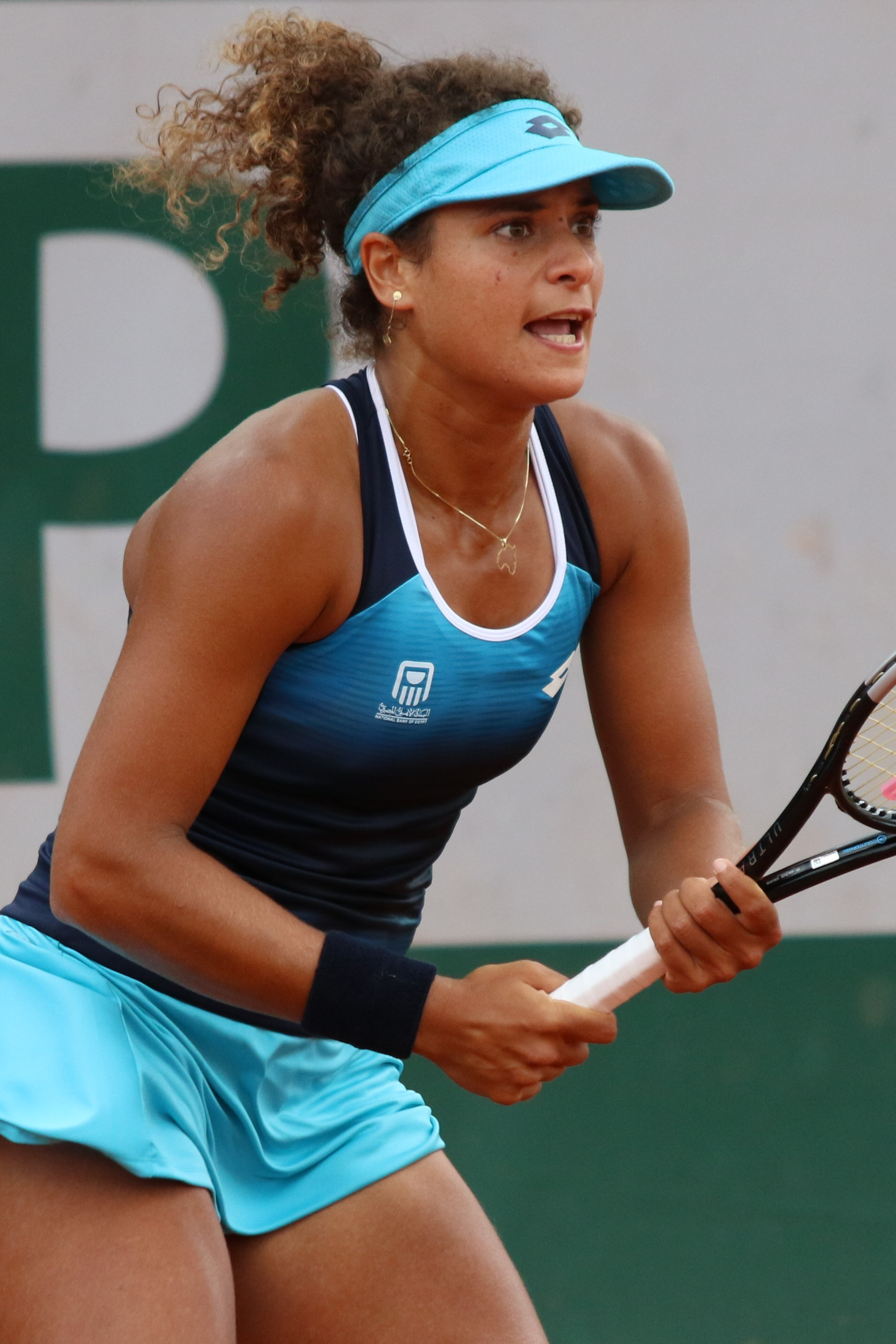
- Sherif at the 2022 French Open
- Full name: Mayar Sherif Ahmed Abdel-Aziz
- Country (sports): Egypt
- Residence: Cairo, Egypt
- Born: 5 May 1996 (age 30) Cairo, Egypt
- Height: 1.80 m (5 ft 11 in)
- Plays: Right-handed (two-handed backhand)
- College: Pepperdine
- Prize money: $3,403,677

Singles
- Career record: 338–187
- Career titles: 2
- Highest ranking: No. 31 (19 June 2023)
- Current ranking: No. 65 (9 November 2026)

Grand Slam singles results
- Australian Open: 2R (2021)
- French Open: 2R (2022, 2023, 2024, 2026)
- Wimbledon: 1R (2023, 2024, 2025)
- US Open: 1R (2021, 2022, 2023, 2024, 2025, 2026)

Other tournaments
- Olympic Games: 1R (2021, 2024)

Doubles
- Career record: 110–66
- Career titles: 2
- Highest ranking: No. 65 (14 April 2025)
- Current ranking: No. 680 (27 July 2026)

Grand Slam doubles results
- Australian Open: 1R (2022, 2023)
- French Open: 1R (2023, 2025)
- Wimbledon: 2R (2024)
- US Open: 2R (2022)

Team competitions
- Fed Cup: 25–13
Medal record
Representing Egypt
Women's Tennis
African Games
| Gold medal – first place | 2019 Rabat | Singles |
| Gold medal – first place | 2019 Rabat | Doubles |
| Gold medal – first place | 2019 Rabat | Team |
| Gold medal – first place | 2023 Accra | Team |
| Bronze medal – third place | 2023 Accra | Singles |
| Bronze medal – third place | 2023 Accra | Doubles |
- Last updated on: 27 July 2026.

Mayar Sherif Ahmed Abdel-Aziz (Arabic: ميار شريف أحمد عبد العزيز; born 5 May 1996) is an Egyptian professional tennis player. She has a career-high WTA ranking of No. 31 in singles, making her the highest ranked Egyptian singles player, male or female, in the Open Era. She also has a career-high of No. 65 in doubles. Sherif has won two singles titles on the WTA Tour and two titles in doubles. She has also won a record 10 WTA 125 singles titles and two doubles titles on the WTA Challenger Tour along with eleven singles and six doubles titles on the ITF Circuit. She is the younger sister of Rana Sherif Ahmed.

Sherif spent her final two years of college at Pepperdine University in Malibu, California, graduating in 2018 with a bachelor of science in sports medicine. She was part of the university's tennis team and was an All-American in both 2017 and 2018, and the West Coast Conference Player of the Year in 2018. She made the semifinals of the 2018 NCAA singles tournament and ended her senior season ranked 11th in the nation in singles.

Sherif made her WTA Tour singles debut at the 2020 Prague Open. She was the first Egyptian female player in a main draw of a major tournament, at the 2020 French Open. She made history again for Egyptian tennis at the 2021 Australian Open, becoming the first woman from her nation to win a Grand Slam tournament main-draw match. She became also the first Egyptian woman to qualify for the Olympic Games and reach a WTA tournament final in Cluj-Napoca. At the 2023 Madrid Open, she became the first Egyptian player to reach a WTA 1000 quarterfinal.

Playing for Egypt Billie Jean King Cup team, she has a win–loss record of 25–13 (singles 13–7) as of June 2025.

== Professional ==
=== 2019–2020: Historic major & WTA Tour debuts ===
Sherif started 2020 playing in the Australian Open qualifiers which was her first appearance at a major tournament. She lost in the first round of qualifiers to Ann Li. In March, she won the title at a $25k tournament in Antalya defeating Dalma Gálfi in the final.

In August, at the Prague Open Prague Open, Sherif advanced through the qualifying making her main-draw debut at WTA Tour-level. In the first round, she lost there to Laura Siegemund in three sets.

In late September 2020, Sherif defeated Camila Osorio, Caty McNally and Giulia Gatto-Monticone in the French Open qualifying. Making her major main-draw debut as the first Egyptian female player, Sherif came up against second seed and world No. 3, Karolína Plíšková, losing in three sets.

=== 2021: Major & WTA 1000 wins, Olympics & top 100 debut ===
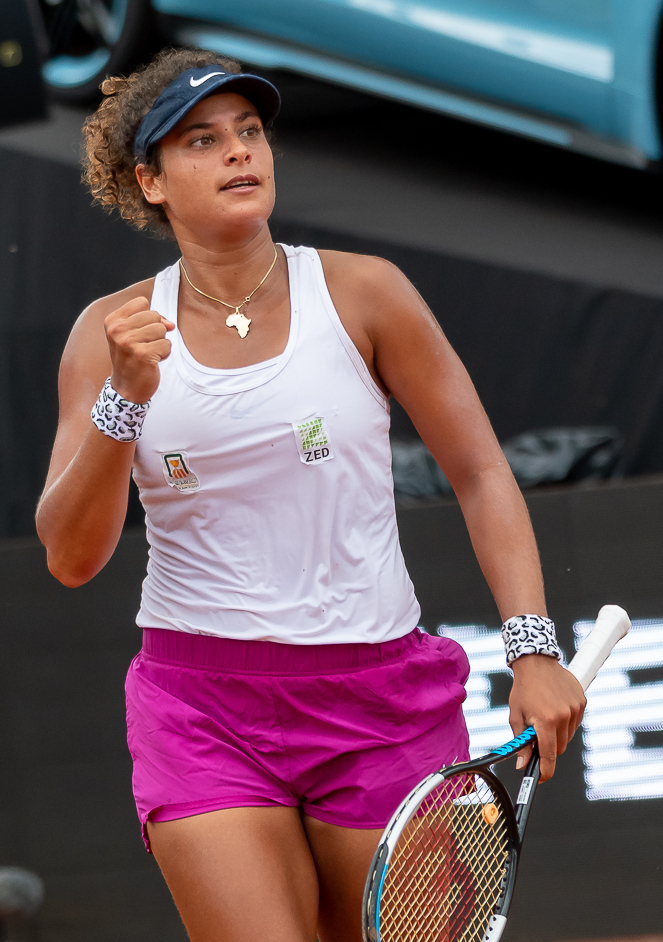
Sherif at the 2021 Winners Open.

Sherif again made history as the first Egyptian woman to win a match at a Grand Slam tournament, beating Chloé Paquet in the first round of the Australian Open.

She qualified for Indian Wells making her WTA 1000 debut, and defeated Zheng Saisai for her first win at this level. She received a wildcard for the WTA 1000 Miami Open.

Sherif delivered another highlight, when she, as the first Egyptian woman, qualified for the Tokyo Olympics, after winning the 2019 African Games.

Sherif also became the first Egyptian woman to reach a WTA Tour singles and doubles final in Cluj-Napoca. In singles, she defeated top seed Alizé Cornet, Alex Eala, Kristína Kučová and Mihaela Buzărnescu but lost to Andrea Petkovic in the final. In doubles, partnering Katarzyna Piter, she lost to Natela Dzalamidze and Kaja Juvan in the final. As a result, she entered the top 100 at world No. 97, on 9 August 2021, the first Egyptian woman to do so, and also reached a career-high in doubles at No. 154.

=== 2022: Maiden career title, top 50 in singles & top 100 in doubles ===
She made her top 50 debut in singles and reached world No. 98 in doubles on 16 May 2022.

At the French Open, she became the first Egyptian woman to win a Roland Garros main-draw match, defeating Marta Kostyuk in two sets. She withdrew in the second round due to injury.

At the Emilia-Romagna Open in Parma, Sherif defeated Anna Bondár, Simona Waltert, Lauren Davis, and Ana Bogdan to reach her second WTA 250 final, and her first since the previous summer. She then defeated top seed and world No. 7, Maria Sakkari, in straight sets to claim her first singles title and become the first woman from Egypt to win a WTA Tour title. The win against Sakkari was also her first top-10 win.

=== 2023: WTA 1000 quarterfinal, record sixth WTA 125 title, historic ranking ===
At the Madrid Open, Sherif defeated Camila Giorgi by retirement, 30th seed Anhelina Kalinina, world No. 5 Caroline Garcia and 24th seed Elise Mertens to reach her first WTA 1000 singles quarterfinal, thus also becoming the first Egyptian player to do so.

She won her second WTA 125 title at the Open Internacional de Valencia in two weeks following her triumph at the WTA 125 Makarska International. As a result, she reached a historic career-high of No. 31 in the singles rankings, becoming the highest ranked Egyptian player, male or female, in the Open era. No other player had won more than three WTA Challenger titles since the level was introduced in 2012.

=== 2024: Madrid and Rome third rounds, five final defeats ===
In April, Sherif reached the third round at the Madrid Open with wins over Lauren Davis and 25th seed Marta Kostyuk before losing to world No. 4, Elena Rybakina. At the start of May, she reached the final at the Catalonia Open in Lleida, Spain, where she lost to Katerina Siniaková in a match lasting almost three hours.

At the Italian Open in Rome later that month, Sherif made the third round, defeating 11th seed Jasmine Paolini on the way, before losing to 25th seed Victoria Azarenka in three sets. The following week she lost in the final of the Emilia-Romagna Open in Parma to Anna Karolína Schmiedlová. Sherif suffered similar disappointment at her next tournament, the Morocco Open where she was defeated in the final by Peyton Stearns.

She reached the final as she attempted to defend her Makarska International title in June, but lost to Katie Volynets in three sets. In July, Sherif was runner-up at the Contrexéville Open in France, losing to Lucia Bronzetti in a final which lasted more than three-and-a-half hours.

As top seed at the Hamburg European Open in August, she reached the quarterfinals but was defeated by Olga Danilović. Partnering with Anna Blinkova, Sherif won the doubles at the Jasmin Open, defeating Alina Korneeva and Anastasia Zakharova in the final.

Alongside Nina Stojanović, she won the doubles title at WTA 125 Copa Colina in Chile in November. Later that month, Sherif won the singles title at the WTA 125 Argentina Open, defeating Katarzyna Kawa in three sets in the final.

=== 2025: Second WTA doubles title ===
Teaming up with Katarzyna Piter, Sherif won her second WTA Tour doubles title at the Mérida Open, defeating top seeds Anna Danilina and Irina Khromacheva in the final.

She overcame Victoria Mboko in the final at the Emilia-Romagna Open to win her eighth WTA 125 singles title.

In November at the WTA 125 Tucumán Open, Sherif reached the final, but lost to Oleksandra Oliynykova in three sets.

=== 2026: Second WTA Tour singles title ===
In May, Sherif qualified for the main-draw at the French Open and made it through to the second round where she lost to fourth seed Coco Gauff. The following month she won the WTA 125 Internazionali Femminili di Brescia, defeating top seed Wang Xiyu in the final. In July, Sherif claimed her 10th WTA 125 singles title at Contrexéville, overcoming Jeline Vandromme in the final. The following week, she won her second WTA Tour singles title at the Iași Open, defeating third seed Oleksandra Oliynykova in the semifinals and then claiming the trophy when Paula Badosa retired because of injury during the second set of the final with Sherif leading by a set and a double break of serve. Moving onto the Hamburg Open the next week, Sherif extended her winning streak to 13 matches en route to reaching the semifinals, where she retired due to a left leg injury while trailing fifth seed Tamara Korpatsch by a set and a break of serve.

== Performance timelines ==
Key
| W | F | SF | QF | #R | RR | Q# | P# | DNQ | A | Z# | PO | G | S | B | NMS | NTI | P | NH |

(W) winner; (F) finalist; (SF) semifinalist; (QF) quarterfinalist; (#R) rounds 4, 3, 2, 1; (RR) round-robin stage; (Q#) qualification round; (P#) preliminary round; (DNQ) did not qualify; (A) absent; (Z#) Davis/Fed Cup Zonal Group (with number indication) or (PO) play-off; (G) gold, (S) silver or (B) bronze Olympic/Paralympic medal; (NMS) not a Masters tournament; (NTI) not a Tier I tournament; (P) postponed; (NH) not held; (SR) strike rate (events won / competed); (W–L) win–loss record.
To avoid confusion and double counting, these charts are updated at the conclusion of a tournament or when the player's participation has ended.

Only main-draw results in WTA Tour, Grand Slam tournaments, Billie Jean King Cup, United Cup, Hopman Cup and Olympic Games are included in win–loss records.

=== Singles ===
Current through the 2023 China Open.

| Tournament | 2011 | ... | 2014 | ... | 2019 | 2020 | 2021 | 2022 | 2023 | 2024 | SR | W–L | Win% |
|---|---|---|---|---|---|---|---|---|---|---|---|---|---|
Grand Slam tournaments
| Australian Open | A | | A | | A | Q1 | 2R | 1R | 1R | 1R | 0 / 4 | 1–4 | 20% |
| French Open | A | | A | | A | 1R | Q2 | 2R (Note: Withdrew during the tournament; not counted as a loss.) | 2R | 2R | 0 / 4 | 3–3 | 50% |
| Wimbledon | A | | A | | A | NH | Q2 | A | 1R | 1R | 0 / 2 | 0–2 | 0% |
| US Open | A | | A | | A | A | 1R | 1R | 1R | 1R | 0 / 4 | 0–4 | 0% |
| Win–loss | 0–0 | | 0–0 | | 0–0 | 0–1 | 1–2 | 1–2 | 1–4 | 1–4 | 0 / 14 | 4–13 | 24% |
National representation
| Summer Olympics | NH | | | | | | 1R | NH | | 1R | 0 / 2 | 0–2 | 0% |
| Billie Jean King Cup (Note: Formerly known as Fed Cup until 2020.) | Z3 | | Z2 | | Z3 | Z2 (Note: Edition is split into the two years due to COVID-19.) | | Z2 | | | 0 / 0 | 9–6 | 60% |
WTA 1000
| Qatar Open (Note: The first Premier 5 event of the year has switched back and forth between the Dubai Tennis Championships and the Qatar Ladies Open since 2009. Dubai was classified as a Premier 5 event from 2009–2011 before being succeeded by Doha for the 2012–2014 period. In 2015, Dubai regained its Premier 5 status while Doha was demoted to Premier status. The Premier 5 tournaments were reclassified as WTA 1000 tournaments in 2021.) | NMS | | A | | NMS | A | NMS | 1R | NMS | A | 0 / 1 | 0–1 | 0% |
| Dubai | A | | NMS | | A | NMS | A | NMS | A | A | 0 / 0 | 0–0 | – |
| Indian Wells Open | A | | A | | A | NH | 2R | 1R | 1R | 1R | 0 / 4 | 1–4 | 20% |
| Miami Open | A | | A | | A | NH | 1R | 1R | 1R | A | 0 / 3 | 0–3 | 0% |
| Madrid Open | A | | A | | A | NH | A | Q1 | QF | 3R | 0 / 2 | 6–2 | 75% |
| Italian Open | A | | A | | A | A | A | A | 1R | 3R | 0 / 2 | 2–2 | 50% |
| Canadian Open | A | | A | | A | NH | A | A | 1R | A | 0 / 1 | 0–1 | 0% |
| Cincinnati Open | A | | A | | A | A | A | 1R | 2R | | 0 / 2 | 1–2 | 33% |
| Guadalajara Open | NH | | | | | | | A | 1R | NMS | 0 / 1 | 0–1 | 0% |
| Wuhan Open | A | | A | | A | NH | | | | | 0 / 0 | 0–0 | – |
| China Open | A | | A | | A | NH | | | 1R | | 0 / 1 | 0–1 | 0% |
| Win–loss | 0–0 | | 0–0 | | 0–0 | 0–0 | 1–2 | 0–4 | 5–8 | 0 / 14 | 6–14 | 30% | |
Career statistics
| | 2011 | ... | 2014 | ... | 2019 | 2020 | 2021 | 2022 | 2023 | 2024 | SR | W–L | Win% |
| Tournaments | 0 (Note: During the season, she did not play in the main draw of any WTA Tour-level tournaments. However, she played at the Billie Jean King Cup, which is not counted as a played tournament but matches count.) | | 0 | | 0 | 2 | 11 | 15 | 21 | | Career total: 49 | | |
| Titles | 0 | | 0 | | 0 | 0 | 0 | 1 | 0 | 0 | Career total: 1 | | |
| Finals | 0 | | 0 | | 0 | 0 | 1 | 1 | 0 | 1 | Career total: 3 | | |
| Hard win–loss | 0–0 | | 0–3 | | 0–0 | 2–2 | 3–9 | 4–12 | 4–12 | | 0 / 33 | 13–38 | 25% |
| Clay win–loss | 1–1 | | 0–0 | | 3–0 | 0–2 | 4–2 | 7–1 | 9–7 | | 1 / 14 | 24–13 | 65% |
| Grass win–loss | 0–0 | | 0–0 | | 0–0 | 0–0 | 0–0 | 0–0 | 1–2 | | 0 / 2 | 1–2 | 33% |
| Overall win–loss | 1–1 | | 0–3 | | 3–0 | 2–4 | 7–11 | 11–13 | 14–21 | | 1 / 49 | 38–53 | 42% |
| Year-end ranking (Note: 2012: WTA ranking-n/a, 2013: WTA ranking-641, ... 2015-16: WTA ranking-n/a, 2017: WTA ranking-780, 2018: WTA ranking-n/a.) | n/a | | 865 | | 212 | 132 | 61 | 63 | 49 | 100 | $1,963,221 | | |

=== Doubles ===
Current through the 2023 Wimbledon Championships.

| Tournament | 2011 | ... | 2014 | ... | 2019 | 2020 | 2021 | 2022 | 2023 | SR | W–L | Win% |
|---|---|---|---|---|---|---|---|---|---|---|---|---|
Grand Slam tournaments
| Australian Open | A | | A | | A | A | A | 1R | 1R | 0 / 2 | 0–2 | 0% |
| French Open | A | | A | | A | A | A | A | 1R | 0 / 1 | 0–1 | 0% |
| Wimbledon | A | | A | | A | NH | A | A | 1R | 0 / 1 | 0–1 | 0% |
| US Open | A | | A | | A | A | A | 2R | 1R | 0 / 2 | 1–2 | 33% |
| Win–loss | 0–0 | | 0–0 | | 0–0 | 0–0 | 0–0 | 1–2 | 0–4 | 0 / 5 | 1–6 | 14% |
National representation
| Billie Jean King Cup | Z3 | | Z2 | | Z3 | Z2 | | Z2 | | 0 / 0 | 10–5 | 67% |
Career statistics
| Tournaments | 0 | | 0 | | 0 | 0 | 2 | 6 | 7 | Career total: 15 | | |
| Titles | 0 | | 0 | | 0 | 0 | 0 | 0 | 0 | Career total: 0 | | |
| Finals | 0 | | 0 | | 0 | 0 | 1 | 1 | 0 | Career total: 2 | | |
| Overall win–loss | 4–1 | | 1–2 | | 2–0 | 1–1 | 3–2 | 8–6 | 1–7 | 0 / 15 | 20–19 | 51% |
| Year-end ranking (Note: 2013: WTA ranking-700, ... 2015-16: WTA ranking-n/a, 2017: WTA ranking-1049, 2018: WTA ranking-n/a.) | n/a | | n/a | | 461 | 189 | 142 | 123 | 159 | | | |

== WTA Tour finals ==
=== Singles: 4 (2 titles, 2 runner-ups) ===
| Legend WTA 250 (2–2) | Finals by surface Clay (2–2) | Finals by setting Outdoor (2–2) |

| Result | W–L | Date | Tournament | Tier | Surface | Opponent | Score |
|---|---|---|---|---|---|---|---|
| Loss | 0–1 | Aug 2021 | Winners Open, Romania | WTA 250 | Clay | (Germany) Andrea Petkovic | 1–6, 1–6 |
| Win | 1–1 | Oct 2022 | Parma Open, Italy | WTA 250 | Clay | (Greece) Maria Sakkari | 7–5, 6–3 |
| Loss | 1–2 | May 2024 | Rabat Grand Prix, Morocco | WTA 250 | Clay | (United States) Peyton Stearns | 2–6, 1–6 |
| Win | 2–2 | Jul 2026 | Iași Open, Romania | WTA 250 | Clay | (Spain) Paula Badosa | 6–4, 4–0 ret. |

=== Doubles: 4 (2 titles, 2 runner-ups) ===
| Legend WTA 500 (1–0) WTA 250 (1–2) | Finals by surface Hard (2–1) Clay (0–1) | Finals by setting Outdoor (2–2) |

| Result | W–L | Date | Tournament | Tier | Surface | Partner | Opponents | Score |
|---|---|---|---|---|---|---|---|---|
| Loss | 0–1 | Aug 2021 | Winners Open, Romania | WTA 250 | Clay | (Poland) Katarzyna Piter | (Russia) Natela Dzalamidze (Slovenia) Kaja Juvan | 3–6, 4–6 |
| Loss | 0–2 | Jan 2022 | Melbourne Summer; Set, Australia | WTA 250 | Hard | (Czech Republic) Tereza Martincová | (United States) Bernarda Pera (Czech Republic) Kateřina Siniaková | 2–6, 7–6^{(7)}, [5–10] |
| Win | 1–2 | Sep 2024 | Jasmin Open, Tunisia | WTA 250 | Hard | Anna Blinkova | Alina Korneeva; Anastasia Zakharova | 2–6, 6–1, [10–8] |
| Win | 2–2 | Mar 2025 | Mérida Open, Mexico | WTA 500 | Hard | (Poland) Katarzyna Piter | (Kazakhstan) Anna Danilina; Irina Khromacheva | 7–6^{(2)}, 7–5 |

== WTA 125 finals ==
=== Singles: 15 (10 titles, 5 runner-ups) ===
| Result | W–L | Date | Tournament | Surface | Opponent | Score |
|---|---|---|---|---|---|---|
| Win | 1–0 | Sep 2021 | Karlsruhe Open, Germany | Clay | (Italy) Martina Trevisan | 6–3, 6–2 |
| Win | 2–0 | Apr 2022 | Marbella Open, Spain | Clay | (Germany) Tamara Korpatsch | 7–6^{(7–1)}, 6–4 |
| Win | 3–0 | May 2022 | Karlsruhe Open, Germany (2) | Clay | (United States) Bernarda Pera | 6–2, 6–4 |
| Win | 4–0 | Nov 2022 | Copa Santiago, Chile | Clay | (Ukraine) Kateryna Baindl | 3–6, 7–6^{(7–3)}, 7–5 |
| Win | 5–0 | Jun 2023 | Makarska International, Croatia | Clay | (Italy) Jasmine Paolini | 2–6, 7–6^{(8–6)}, 7–5 |
| Win | 6–0 | Jun 2023 | Internacional de Valencia, Spain | Clay | (Spain) Marina Bassols Ribera | 6–3, 6–3 |
| Loss | 6–1 | May 2024 | Catalonia Open, Spain | Clay | (Czech Republic) Kateřina Siniaková | 4–6, 6–3, 3–6 |
| Loss | 6–2 | May 2024 | Parma Open, Italy | Clay | (Slovakia) Anna Karolína Schmiedlová | 5–7, 6–2, 4–6 |
| Loss | 6–3 | Jun 2024 | Makarska International, Croatia | Clay | (United States) Katie Volynets | 6–3, 2–6, 1–6 |
| Loss | 6–4 | Jul 2024 | Contrexéville Open, France | Clay | (Italy) Lucia Bronzetti | 4–6, 7–6^{(7–4)}, 5–7 |
| Win | 7–4 | Nov 2024 | Buenos Aires Open, Argentina | Clay | (Poland) Katarzyna Kawa | 6–3, 4–6, 6–4 |
| Win | 8–4 | May 2025 | Parma Open, Italy | Clay | (Canada) Victoria Mboko | 6–4, 6–4 |
| Loss | 8–5 | Nov 2025 | Tucumán Open, Argentina | Clay | (Ukraine) Oleksandra Oliynykova | 6–3, 2–6, 2–6 |
| Win | 9–5 | Jun 2026 | Internazionali di Brescia, Italy | Clay | (China) Wang Xiyu | 6–4, 6–3 |
| Win | 10–5 | Jul 2026 | Contrexéville Open, France | Clay | (Belgium) Jeline Vandromme | 3–6, 7–6^{(7–0)}, 7–5 |

=== Doubles: 6 (2 titles, 4 runner-ups) ===
| Result | W–L | Date | Tournament | Surface | Partner | Opponents | Score |
|---|---|---|---|---|---|---|---|
| Loss | 0–1 | Sep 2021 | Karlsruhe Open, Germany | Clay | (Poland) Katarzyna Piter | (Romania) Irina Bara (Georgia (country)) Ekaterine Gorgodze | 3–6, 6–2, [7–10] |
| Win | 1–1 | May 2022 | Karlsruhe Open, Germany | Clay | (Hungary) Panna Udvardy | (Russia) Yana Sizikova (Belgium) Alison Van Uytvanck | 5–7, 6–4, [10–2] |
| Loss | 1–2 | Nov 2022 | Copa Santiago, Chile | Clay | (Slovenia) Tamara Zidanšek | (Russia) Yana Sizikova (Indonesia) Aldila Sutjiadi | 1–6, 6–3, [7–10] |
| Loss | 1–3 | May 2024 | Catalonia Open, Spain | Clay | (Poland) Katarzyna Piter | (Australia) Ellen Perez (United States) Nicole Melichar-Martinez | 5–7, 2–6 |
| Win | 2–3 | Nov 2024 | Copa Santiago, Chile | Clay | (Serbia) Nina Stojanović | (France) Léolia Jeanjean (France) Kristina Mladenovic | w/o |
| Loss | 2–4 | Nov 2024 | Buenos Aires Open, Argentina | Clay | (Brazil) Laura Pigossi | (Poland) Maja Chwalińska (Poland) Katarzyna Kawa | 4–6, 6–3, [7–10] |

== ITF Circuit finals ==
=== Singles: 20 (11 titles, 9 runner-ups) ===
| Legend W100 tournaments (3–0) W60 tournaments (0–2) W25 tournaments (3–3) 10/15k tournaments (5–4) | Finals by surface Hard (3–2) Clay (8–7) |

| Result | W–L | Date | Tournament | Tier | Surface | Opponent | Score |
|---|---|---|---|---|---|---|---|
| Win | 1–0 | Jan 2013 | ITF Sharm El Sheikh, Egypt | 10k | Hard | (Bulgaria) Aleksandrina Naydenova | 6–2, 2–6, 6–1 |
| Loss | 1–1 | Sep 2013 | ITF Lleida, Spain | 10k | Clay | (Spain) Aliona Bolsova | 6–0, 3–6, 2–6 |
| Loss | 1–2 | Nov 2013 | ITF Vinaròs, Spain | 10k | Clay | (Spain) Olga Sáez Larra | 6–4, 5–7, 4–6 |
| Loss | 1–3 | Jul 2017 | ITF Sharm El Sheikh, Egypt | 15k | Hard | (Sweden) Jacqueline Cabaj Awad | 7–6^{(7–4)}, 5–7, 4–6 |
| Loss | 1–4 | Jul 2017 | ITF Sharm El Sheikh | 15k | Hard | (Greece) Eleni Kordolaimi | 4–6, 6–3, 2–6 |
| Win | 2–4 | Feb 2019 | ITF Sharm El Sheikh | 15k | Hard | (Switzerland) Simona Waltert | 6–4, 1–6, 6–3 |
| Win | 3–4 | May 2019 | ITF Cairo, Egypt | 15k | Clay | (Switzerland) Simona Waltert | 6–2, 6–1 |
| Win | 4–4 | Jun 2019 | ITF Tabarka, Tunisia | 15k | Clay | (Chile) Bárbara Gatica | 6–4, 6–4 |
| Win | 5–4 | Jun 2019 | ITF Tabarka, Tunisia | 15k | Clay | (Switzerland) Nina Stadler | 6–3, 6–2 |
| Win | 6–4 | Jun 2019 | ITF Madrid, Spain | W25 | Hard | (Spain) Eva Guerrero Álvarez | 6–2, 6–3 |
| Loss | 6–5 | Jul 2019 | ITF Biella, Italy | W25 | Clay | (Ukraine) Katarina Zavatska | 1–6, 3–6 |
| Loss | 6–6 | Jul 2019 | ITF Baja, Hungary | W25 | Clay | (Hungary) Réka Luca Jani | 3–6, 6–2, 2–6 |
| Win | 7–6 | Aug 2019 | ITF Las Palmas, Spain | W25+H | Clay | (Switzerland) Leonie Küng | 6–1, 6–0 |
| Win | 8–6 | Mar 2020 | ITF Antalya, Turkey | W25 | Clay | (Hungary) Dalma Galfi | 6–4, 6–3 |
| Win | 9–6 | Nov 2020 | ITF Charleston Pro, US | W100 | Clay | (Poland) Katarzyna Kawa | 6–2, 6–3 |
| Loss | 9–7 | Nov 2020 | ITF Las Palmas de Gran Canaria, Spain | W25 | Clay | (Estonia) Kaia Kanepi | 3–6, 2–6 |
| Loss | 9–8 | Jul 2021 | Open de Montpellier, France | W60 | Clay | (Ukraine) Anhelina Kalinina | 2–6, 3–6 |
| Loss | 9–9 | Aug 2021 | ITF San Bartolomé de Tirajana, Spain | W60 | Clay | (Netherlands) Arantxa Rus | 4–6, 2–6 |
| Win | 10–9 | Apr 2025 | Open Villa de Madrid, Spain | W100 | Clay | (Mexico) Renata Zarazúa | 6–3, 6–4 |
| Win | 11–9 | Jun 2025 | Open de Biarritz, France | W100 | Clay | (France) Tiantsoa Rakotomanga Rajaonah | 7–5, 6–4 |

=== Doubles: 13 (6 titles, 7 runner-ups) ===
| Legend W100 tournaments (0–2) W25 tournaments (2–1) $10/15k tournaments (4–4) | Finals by surface Hard (3–4) Clay (3–3) |

| Result | W–L | Date | Tournament | Tier | Surface | Partner | Opponents | Score |
|---|---|---|---|---|---|---|---|---|
| Loss | 0–1 | Jan 2013 | ITF Sharm El Sheikh, Egypt | 10k | Hard | (Netherlands) Valeria Podda | (Russia) Eugeniya Pashkova (Russia) Ekaterina Yashina | 6–3, 2–6, [3–10] |
| Loss | 0–2 | Jun 2013 | ITF Melilla, Spain | 10k | Hard | (Hungary) Vanda Lukács | (Spain) Lucia Cervera-Vasquez (Spain) Pilar Dominguez-Lopez | 3–6, 4–6 |
| Win | 1–2 | Jul 2013 | ITF Sharm El Sheikh | 10k | Hard | (South Africa) Lynn Kiro | (Russia) Alina Mikheeva (Russia) Anna Morgina | 6–3, 6–2 |
| Win | 2–2 | Jul 2013 | ITF Sharm El Sheikh | 10k | Hard | (Slovakia) Zuzana Zlochová | (India) Sowjanya Bavisetti (India) Rishika Sunkara | 7–5, 6–3 |
| Loss | 2–3 | Apr 2014 | ITF Sharm El Sheikh | 10k | Hard | (Egypt) Ola Abou Zekry | (Croatia) Jana Fett (Ukraine) Oleksandra Korashvili | 4–6, 5–7 |
| Win | 3–3 | Jul 2017 | ITF Sharm El Sheikh | 15k | Hard | (India) Rutuja Bhosale | (Chinese Taipei) Chen Pei-hsuan (Chinese Taipei) Wu Fang-hsien | 3–6, 6–3, [10–5] |
| Loss | 3–4 | Apr 2019 | ITF Cairo, Egypt | W15 | Clay | (Egypt) Rana Sherif Ahmed | (Greece) Despina Papamichail (Switzerland) Simona Waltert | 3–6, 2–6 |
| Win | 4–4 | Jun 2019 | ITF Tabarka, Tunisia | W15 | Clay | (Slovakia) Alica Rusová | (Germany) Lena Lutzeier (Switzerland) Nina Stadler | 6–4, 4–6, [10–4] |
| Loss | 4–5 | Jul 2019 | ITF Turin, Italy | W25 | Clay | (Norway) Melanie Stokke | (Japan) Chihiro Muramatsu (Japan) Yuki Naito | 0–6, 2–6 |
| Win | 5–5 | Jul 2019 | ITF Baja, Hungary | W25 | Clay | (Austria) Melanie Klaffner | (Hungary) Réka Luca Jani (Belgium) Lara Salden | 6–2, 4–6, [10–8] |
| Loss | 5–6 | Feb 2020 | Cairo Open, Egypt | W100 | Hard | (Netherlands) Arantxa Rus | (Serbia) Aleksandra Krunić (Poland) Katarzyna Piter | 4–6, 2–6 |
| Win | 6–6 | Mar 2020 | ITF Antalya, Turkey | W25 | Clay | (Hungary) Réka Luca Jani | (Turkey) Melis Sezer (Turkey) İpek Öz | 6–7^{(8)}, 6–1, [10–3] |
| Loss | 6–7 | Nov 2020 | ITF Charleston Pro, US | W100 | Clay | (Australia) Astra Sharma | (Poland) Magdalena Fręch (Poland) Katarzyna Kawa | 6–4, 4–6, [2–10] |

== Head-to-head records ==
=== Record against top 10 players ===
- She has a 2–5 record against players who were, at the time the match was played, ranked in the top 10.

| Result | W–L | Player | Rank | Tournament | Surface | Rd | Score | Rank | H2H |
|---|---|---|---|---|---|---|---|---|---|
2020
| Loss | 0–1 | (Czech Republic) Karolína Plíšková | No. 4 | French Open | Clay | 1R | 7–6^{(11–9)}, 2–6, 4–6 | No. 172 | |
2022
| Win | 1–1 | (Greece) Maria Sakkari | No. 7 | Parma Open, Italy | Clay | F | 7–5, 6–3 | No. 74 | |
2023
| Loss | 1–2 | (France) Caroline Garcia | No. 5 | Monterrey Open, Mexico | Hard | QF | 0–6, 4–6 | No. 53 | |
| Win | 2–2 | (France) Caroline Garcia | No. 5 | Madrid Open, Spain | Clay | 3R | 7–6^{(7–2)}, 6–3 | No. 59 | |
| Loss | 2–3 | Aryna Sabalenka | No. 2 | Madrid Open, Spain | Clay | QF | 6–2, 2–6, 1–6 | No. 59 | |
| Loss | 2–4 | (Czech Republic) Markéta Vondroušová | No. 10 | Canadian Open | Hard | 1R | 4–6, 2–6 | No. 33 | |
| Loss | 2–5 | (United States) Coco Gauff | No. 7 | Cincinnati Open, US | Hard | 2R | 2–6, 2–6 | No. 33 | |
2024
| Loss | 2-6 | (Kazakhstan) Elena Rybakina | No. 4 | Madrid Open, Spain | Clay | 3R | 1-6, 4-6 | No. 72 | |
