= Evelyne Tiron =

Romanian tennis player (born 1999)

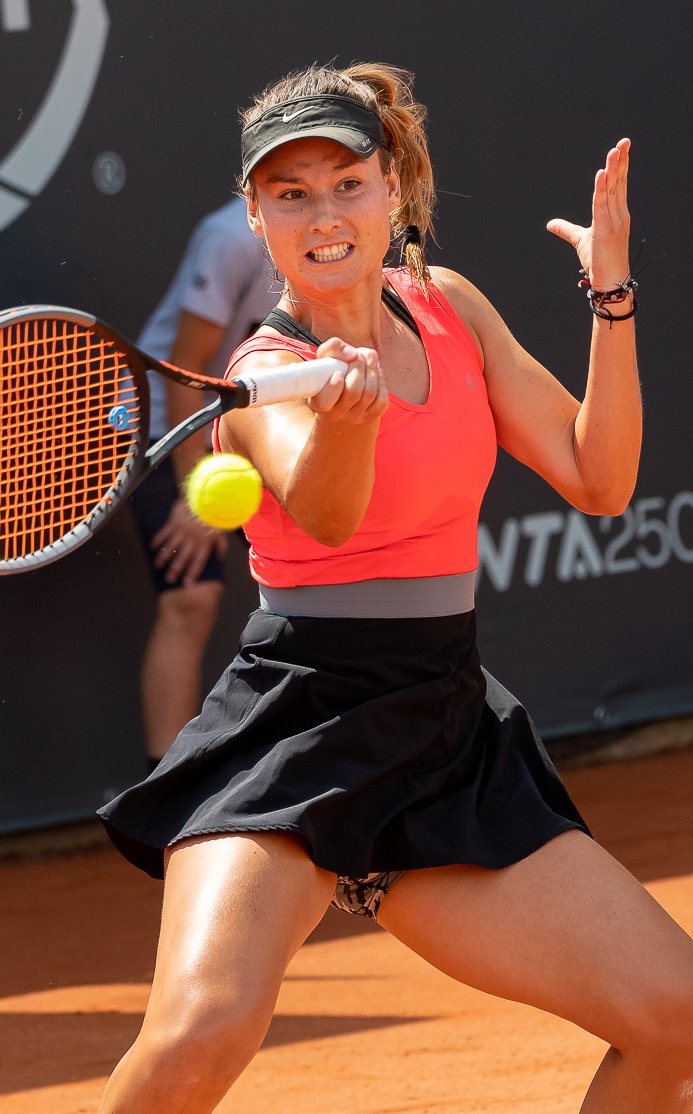
- Tiron at the 2021 Winners Open
- Full name: Evelyne Christelle Atticia Tiron
- Country (sports): Romania
- Born: 21 April 1999 (age 26)
- College: South Florida
- Prize money: US$10,084

Singles
- Career record: 44–35
- Career titles: 0

Doubles
- Career record: 4–9
- Career titles: 0
- Highest ranking: No. 1294 (8 September 2025)
- Current ranking: No. 1424 (8 January 2024)
- Last updated on: 8 January 2024.

Evelyne Christelle Atticia Tiron (born 21 April 1999) is a Romanian former tennis player. Tiron played college tennis at the University of South Florida.

== Career ==
Tiron made her WTA Tour main draw debut at the 2021 Winners Open, where she received a wildcard to the singles event main draw, losing to Lara Arruabarrena in the first round.
