= Catalonia Open (tennis) =

Women's outdoor tennis tournament in Spain

WTA 125
- Event name: Catalonia Open Solgironès
- Tour: WTA Tour
- Founded: 2023
- Location: Sabadell (2027); Spain
- Category: WTA 125
- Surface: Clay - outdoors
- Draw: 32S / 8D
- Prize money: US$115,000 (2026)
- Website: Catalonia Solgironès

Current champions (2026)
- Women's singles: (Australia) Daria Kasatkina
- Women's doubles: Elena Pridankina (China) Tang Qianhui

The Catalonia Open Solgironès is a WTA 125-level professional women's tennis tournament. It takes place on outdoor clay courts, in the month of April at various locations in the region of Catalonia in Spain. The first edition was staged at the Club Tennis Reus Monterols in the city of Reus in Tarragona in 2023 with plans to host the tournament in other clubs in the region in order to promote women's tennis. The 2024 edition took place in Lleida; the 2025 one took place in Vic, and the 2026 in La Bisbal d'Empordà.

The tournament director is former top 100 player Laura Pous Tió.

== Results ==
=== Singles ===
City	Year	Champion	Runner-up	Score
Sabadell	2027			
La Bisbal	2026	(Australia) Daria Kasatkina	(Germany) Tamara Korpatsch	2–6, 6–3, 7–5
Vic	2025	(Hungary) Dalma Gálfi	(Switzerland) Rebeka Masarova	6–3, 6–0
Lleida	2024	(Czech Republic) Kateřina Siniaková	(Egypt) Mayar Sherif	6–4, 4–6, 6–3
Reus	2023	(Romania) Sorana Cîrstea	(United States) Elizabeth Mandlik	6–1, 4–6, 7–6^{(7–1)}

=== Doubles ===
City	Year	Champions	Runners-up	Score
Sabadell	2027			
La Bisbal	2026	Elena Pridankina (China) Tang Qianhui	(Slovakia) Tereza Mihalíková (United Kingdom) Olivia Nicholls	6–1, 6–3
Vic	2025	(Canada) Bianca Andreescu (Indonesia) Aldila Sutjiadi	(Canada) Leylah Fernandez (New Zealand) Lulu Sun	6–2, 6–4
Lleida	2024	(United States) Nicole Melichar-Martinez (Australia) Ellen Perez (2)	(Poland) Katarzyna Piter (Egypt) Mayar Sherif	7–5, 6–2
Reus	2023	(Australia) Storm Hunter (Australia) Ellen Perez	(Chile) Alexa Guarachi (New Zealand) Erin Routliffe	6–1, 7–6^{(10–8)}

== See also ==
- Barcelona Ladies Open
- Barcelona Open
- Spanish Open
- Open Tarragona Costa Daurada
- Ciutat de Barcelona
