= Yasmine Kabbaj =

Moroccan tennis player (born 2004)

Yasmine Kabbaj ياسمين قباج
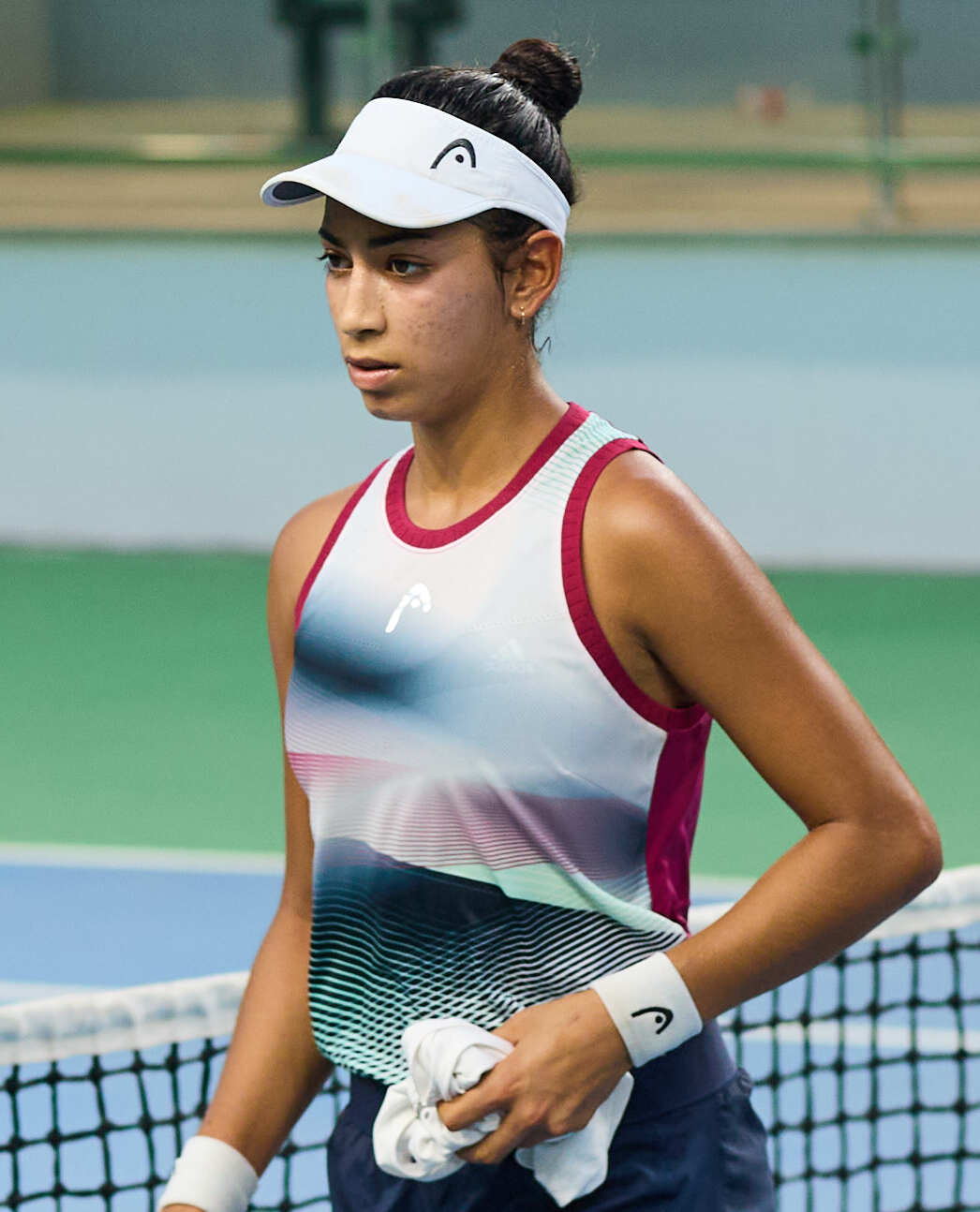
- Kabbaj at the 2023 African Games
- Full name: Yasmine Kabbaj
- Country (sports): Morocco
- Born: 15 January 2004 (age 22) Fez, Morocco
- Plays: Right-handed (two-handed backhand)
- College: Florida International University, San Diego State University
- Prize money: $89,120

Singles
- Career record: 129–83
- Career titles: 4 ITF
- Highest ranking: No. 266 (26 jul 2026)

Doubles
- Career record: 9–18
- Highest ranking: No. 831 (15 July 2024)
- Current ranking: No. 881 (5 January 2026)

Team competitions
- Fed Cup: 9–3
- Last updated on: 20 Ago 2026.

Yasmine Kabbaj
Medal record

Women's tennis

Representing Morocco

Mediterranean Games
Bronze medal – third place	2026 Taranto	Singles

Yasmine Kabbaj (Arabic: ياسمين قباج; born 15 January 2004) is a Moroccan tennis player. She has a career high WTA singles ranking of world No. 331, achieved on 4 May 2026.

Kabbaj played for the Florida International University and the San Diego State University tennis teams.

== Career ==
Kabbaj won her first senior title on the ITF Circuit at the W15 Casablanca in July 2022.

She made her WTA Tour main-draw singles debut as a wildcard entrant at the 2024 Morocco Open, losing in the first round to Elisabetta Cocciaretto.

Ranked No. 334 at her home tournament, the 2026 Morocco Open, Kabbaj reached the quarterfinals as a wildcard with wins over Berfu Cengiz and Tatjana Maria becoming only the second Moroccan to reach that stage at the WTA Tour-level in the Open Era after Nadia Lalami in Fez, Morocco in 2011.

== ITF Circuit finals ==
=== Singles: 5 (4 titles, 1 runner-up) ===
Legend W35 tournaments W15 tournaments	Finals by surface Clay (4–1)

Result	W–L	Date	Tournament	Tier	Surface	Opponent	Score
Win	1–0	Jul 2022	ITF Casablanca, Morocco	W15	Clay	(Germany) Chantal Sauvant	6–4, 6–3
Win	2–0	Jul 2023	ITF Casablanca, Morocco	W15	Clay	(Italy) Sofia Rocchetti	6–2, 6–2
Win	3–0	Oct 2024	ITF Heraklion, Greece	W15	Clay	(Lithuania) Klaudija Bubelytė	6–3, 7–6^{(6)}
Loss	3–1	Jul 2025	ITF Casablanca, Morocco	W15	Clay	Anastasia Zolotareva	6–7^{(1)}, 1–6
Win	4–1	Jul 2025	ITF Mohammedia, Morocco	W35	Clay	(Germany) Carolina Kuhl	6–3, 6–3

=== Doubles: 5 (2 titles, 3 runner–ups) ===
Legend W35 tournaments W15 tournaments	Finals by surface Hard (1–1) Clay (1–2)

Result	W–L	Date	Tournament	Tier	Surface	Partner	Opponents	Score
Loss	0–1	Oct 2025	ITF Santa Margherita di Pula, Italy	W35	Clay	(France) Mathilde Lollia	(Germany) Katharina Hobgarski (Sweden) Lisa Zaar	3–6, 4–6
Loss	0–2	Jan 2026	ITF Cayenne (French Guiana), France	W15	Hard	(France) Pauline Payet	(France) Astrid Cirotte (France) Alizé Lim	3–6, 4–6
Win	1–2	Jan 2026	ITF Petit-Bourg (Guadeloupe), France	W35	Hard	(France) Mathilde Lollia	(France) Audrey Moutama (France) Nehanda Thomias	6–2, 6–1
Win	2–2	Feb 2026	ITF Heraklion, Greece	W35	Clay	(Ukraine) Nadiia Kolb	(Germany) Katharina Hobgarski (Slovakia) Nina Vargová	6–2, 6–1
Loss	2–3	Oct 2026	ITF Seville, Spain	W35	Clay	(Switzerland) Katerina Tsygourova	(France) Marie Mattel (France) Lucie Nguyen Tan	4–6, 6–3, [6–10]

== National representation ==
=== BJK Cup ===
Legend
Finals
Finals Qualifying Round
Finals Play-offs (0–0)
Zone Group (9–3)

Kabbaj made her debut for Morocco Billie Jean King Cup team in 2022, while the team was competing in the Europe/Africa Zone Group III.

==== Singles (8–2) ====
Edition	Stage	Date	Location	Against	Surface	Opponent	W/L	Score
2022	Z3 RR	Jun 2022	Ulcinj (MNE)	Mauritius	Clay	Shannon Wong Hon Chan	W	6–0, 6–0
2022	Z3 RR	Jun 2022	Ulcinj (MNE)	Moldova	Clay	Daniela Ciobanu	W	6–3, 6–3
2022	Z3 RR	Jun 2022	Ulcinj (MNE)	Armenia	Clay	Gabriella Akopyan	W	6–1, 6–0
2022	Z3 PO	Jun 2022	Ulcinj (MNE)	Algeria	Clay	Inès Bekrar	W	6–1, 6–3
2022	Z3 PO	Jun 2022	Ulcinj (MNE)	Bosnia and Herzegovina	Clay	Nefisa Berberović	L	1–6, 5–7
2023	Z3 RR	Jun 2023	Nairobi (KEN)	Uganda	Clay	Winnie Birungi	W	6–1, 6–0
2023	Z3 RR	Jun 2023	Nairobi (KEN)	Namibia	Clay	Joanivia Bezuidenhout	W	6–0, 6–0
2023	Z3 RR	Jun 2023	Nairobi (KEN)	Nigeria	Clay	Oyinlomo Quadre	W	7–5, 7–6^{(10–8)}
2023	Z3 RR	Jun 2023	Nairobi (KEN)	Botswana	Clay	Chelsea Chakanyuka	W	6–3, 6–0
2023	Z3 PO	Jun 2023	Nairobi (KEN)	Tunisia	Clay	Chiraz Bechri	L	4–6, 4–6

==== Doubles (1–1) ====
Edition	Stage	Date	Location	Against	Surface	Partner	Opponents	W/L	Score
2022	Z3 RR	Jun 2022	Ulcinj (MNE)	Moldova	Clay	Rania Azziz	Daniel Ciobanu; Arina Gamretkaia	W	6–3, 7–5
2023	Z3 RR	Jun 2023	Nairobi (KEN)	Kenya	Clay	Aya El Aouni	Angella Okutoyi; Cynthia Wanjala	L	4–6, 5–7

Sporting positions
Preceded by (Belarus) Tatsiana Sasnouskaya	C-USA Tennis Freshman of the Year; 2022	Succeeded by (Nigeria) Oyinlomo Quadre
