= Cristina Bucșa career statistics =

Career finals
Discipline	Type	Won	Lost	Total
Singles	Grand Slam	–	–	–
Singles	WTA Finals	–	–	–
Singles	WTA 1000	–	–	–
Singles	WTA 500	1	–	1
Singles	WTA 250	–	1	1
Singles	Olympics	–	–	–
Singles	Total	1	1	2
Doubles	Grand Slam	–	–	–
Doubles	WTA Finals	–	–	–
Doubles	WTA 1000	1	2	3
Doubles	WTA 500	4	2	6
Doubles	WTA 250	4	2	6
Doubles	Olympics	–	–	0
Doubles	Total	9	6	15

This is a list of career statistics of Spanish tennis player Cristina Bucșa.

== Performance timelines ==
Key
W	F	SF	QF	#R	RR	Q#	DNQ	A	NH

(W) winner; (F) finalist; (SF) semifinalist; (QF) quarterfinalist; (#R) rounds 4, 3, 2, 1; (RR) round-robin stage; (Q#) qualification round; (DNQ) did not qualify; (A) absent; (NH) not held; (SR) strike rate (events won / competed); (W–L) win–loss record.
To avoid confusion and double counting, these charts are updated at the conclusion of a tournament or when the player's participation has ended.

Only main-draw results in WTA Tour, Grand Slam tournaments, Billie Jean King Cup, United Cup, Hopman Cup and Olympic Games are included in win–loss records.

=== Singles ===
Current through the 2026 US Open.

Tournament	2019	2020	2021	2022	2023	2024	2025	2026	SR	W–L	Win%
Grand Slam tournaments
Australian Open	A	Q1	Q1	1R	3R	1R	2R	1R	0 / 5	3–5	38%
French Open	A	Q1	Q1	1R	1R	2R	1R	1R	0 / 5	1–5	17%
Wimbledon	Q2	NH	Q3	Q2	2R	2R	3R	A	0 / 3	4–3	57%
US Open	Q1	A	1R	2R	1R	1R	4R	3R	0 / 5	6–6	50%
Win–loss	0–0	0–0	0–1	1–3	3–4	2–4	6–4	2–3	0 / 19	14–19	42%
National representation
Summer Olympics	Not held		A	Not held		2R	Not held		0 / 1	1–1	50%
WTA 1000 tournaments
Qatar Open	NTI	A	NTI	A	NTI	A	2R	1R	0 / 2	1–2	33%
Dubai Championships	A	NTI	Q1	NTI	Q1	2R (Note: Qualified directly into the second round as a lucky loser. Counted as zero wins and one loss.)	Q1	1R	0 / 2	0–2	0%
Indian Wells Open	A	NH	A	A	2R	1R	Q2	2R	0 / 3	2–3	40%
Miami Open	A	NH	A	A	Q1	1R	Q1	2R	0 / 2	0–2	0%
Madrid Open	A	NH	A	Q1	1R	2R	2R	2R	0 / 4	1–4	20%
Italian Open	A	A	A	Q2	1R	1R	Q1	2R	0 / 3	0–3	0%
Canadian Open	A	NH	A	1R	1R	1R	1R	1R	0 / 5	0–5	0%
Cincinnati Open	A	A	A	A	2R	Q1	1R	2R	0 / 3	2–3	40%
China Open	A	Not held			Q2	4R	2R	2R	0 / 3	4–3	57%
Wuhan Open	A	Not held				1R	Q1		0 / 1	0–1	0%
Guadalajara Open	Not held			A	2R	NTI			0 / 1	1–1	50%
Win–loss	0–0	0–0	0–0	0–1	3–6	4–8	2–5	2–9	0 / 29	11–29	28%
Career statistics
	2019	2020	2021	2022	2023	2024	2025	2026	SR	W–L	Win%
Tournaments	0	0	6	9	19	21	19	12	Career total: 86		
Titles	0	0	0	0	0	0	0	1	Career total: 1		
Finals	0	0	0	0	0	0	1	1	Career total: 2		
Hard win–loss	0–0	0–0	0–2	3–6	6–9	7–13	14–13	14–12	1 / 57	44–56	44%
Clay win–loss	0–0	0–0	1–4	1–2	3–7	5–6	1–3	0–2	0 / 24	11–24	31%
Grass win–loss	0–0	0–0	0–0	0–1	1–3	1–2	3–3	0–0	0 / 9	5–9	36%
Overall win–loss	0–0	0–0	1–6	4–9	10–19	13–21	18–19	14–14	1 / 90	60–89	40%
Year-end ranking (Note: 2013: WTA ranking - 1203, 2014: WTA ranking - 1193, 2015: WTA ranking - 757, 2016: WTA ranking - 798, 2017: WTA ranking - 415, 2018: WTA ranking - 346.)	164	161	159	107	83	71	54		$5,624,196		

=== Doubles ===
Tournament	2019	2020	2021	2022	2023	2024	2025	2026	SR	W–L	Win%
Grand Slam tournaments
Australian Open	A	A	A	A	2R	QF	1R	3R	0 / 4	6–4	60%
French Open	A	A	A	A	1R	3R	1R	3R	0 / 4	4–4	50%
Wimbledon	A	NH	A	A	1R	2R	1R	A	0 / 3	1–3	25%
US Open	A	A	A	A	2R	1R	3R	QF	0 / 4	6–4	60%
Win–loss	0–0	0–0	0–0	0–0	2–4	6–4	2–4	7–3	0 / 15	17–15	53%
National representation
Summer Olympics	Not held		A	Not held		B	Not held		0 / 1	4–1	80%
WTA 1000 tournaments
Qatar Open	NTI	A	NTI	A	NTI	A	1R	QF	0 / 2	2–2	50%
Dubai Championships	A	NTI	A	NTI	A	A	1R	2R	0 / 2	1–2	33%
Indian Wells Open	A	A	A	A	A	1R	1R	SF	0 / 3	3–3	50%
Miami Open	A	A	A	A	A	1R	F	A	0 / 2	4–2	67%
Madrid Open	A	A	A	1R	A	W	1R	2R	1 / 4	6–3	67%
Italian Open	A	A	A	A	A	1R	1R	F	0 / 3	3–3	50%
Canadian Open	A	A	A	A	A	1R	3R	1R	0 / 3	2–3	40%
Cincinnati Open	A	A	A	A	A	2R	2R	1R	0 / 3	2–3	40%
China Open	A	Not held			A	1R	2R	2R	0 / 3	2–3	40%
Wuhan Open	A	Not held				2R	2R	SF	0 / 3	4–3	57%
Guadalajara Open	Not held			A	1R	Not Tier I			0 / 1	0–1	0%
Win–loss	0–0	0–0	0–0	0–1	0–1	7–7	9–10	13–9	1 / 29	29–28	51%
Career statistics
	2019	2020	2021	2022	2023	2024	2025	2026	SR	W–L	Win%
Tournaments	1	1	2	5	10	20	23	16	Career total: 74		
Titles	0	0	0	0	1	4	2	2	Career total: 9		
Finals	0	0	0	1	1	4	3	5	Career total: 15		
Overall win–loss	0–1	0–1	1–2	5–5	8–9	34–15	22–21	30–15	9 / 77	100–69	59%
Year-end ranking (Note: 2015: WTA ranking - 1167, 2016: WTA ranking - 1278, 2017: WTA ranking - 284, 2018: WTA ranking - 172.)	246	270	242	151	66	19	29				

=== Mixed doubles ===
Current through the 2026 French Open.

Tournaments	2024	2025	2026	SR	W–L
Australian Open	A	1R	A	0 / 1	0–1
French Open	1R	2R	QF	0 / 3	3–2
Wimbledon	2R	1R	A	0 / 2	1–2
US Open	2R	A	A	0 / 1	1–1
Win–loss	2–3	1–3	2–0	0 / 7	5–6

== Significant finals ==
=== WTA 1000 tournaments ===
==== Doubles: 3 (1 title, 2 runner-ups) ====
Result	Year	Tournament	Surface	Partner	Opponents	Score
Win	2024	Madrid Open	Clay	(Spain) Sara Sorribes Tormo	(Czech Republic) Barbora Krejčíková (Germany) Laura Siegemund	6–0, 6–2
Loss	2025	Miami Open	Hard	(Japan) Miyu Kato	Mirra Andreeva; Diana Shnaider	3–6, 7–6^{(7–5)}, [2–10]
Loss	2026	Italian Open	Clay	(United States) Nicole Melichar-Martinez	Mirra Andreeva; Diana Shnaider	3–6, 3–6

=== Olympic medal matches ===
==== Doubles: 1 (bronze medal) ====
Result	Year	Tournament	Surface	Partner	Opponents	Score
Bronze	2024	Paris Summer Olympics	Clay	(Spain) Sara Sorribes Tormo	(Czech Republic) Karolína Muchová (Czech Republic) Linda Nosková	6–2, 6–2

== WTA Tour finals ==
=== Singles: 2 (1 title, 1 runner-up) ===
Legend WTA 500 (1–0) WTA 250 (0–1)	Finals by surface Hard (1–1)	Finals by setting Outdoor (1–1)

Result	W–L	Date	Tournament	Tier	Surface	Opponent	Score
Loss	0–1	Nov 2025	Hong Kong Open, China SAR	WTA 250	Hard	(Canada) Victoria Mboko	5–7, 7–6^{(11–9)}, 2–6
Win	1–1	Mar 2026	Mérida Open, Mexico	WTA 500	Hard	(Poland) Magdalena Fręch	6–1, 4–6, 6–4

=== Doubles: 15 (9 titles, 6 runner-ups) ===
Legend WTA 1000 (1–2) WTA 500 (4–2) WTA 250 (4–2)	Finals by surface Hard (5–5) Clay (4–1)	Finals by setting Outdoor (8–6) Indoor (1–0)

Result	W–L	Date	Tournament	Tier	Surface	Partner	Opponents	Score
Loss	0–1	Sep 2022	Portorož Open, Slovenia	WTA 250	Hard	(Slovakia) Tereza Mihalíková	(Ukraine) Marta Kostyuk (Czech Republic) Tereza Martincová	4–6, 0–6
Win	1–1	Feb 2023	Lyon Open, France	WTA 250	Hard (i)	(Netherlands) Bibiane Schoofs	(Serbia) Olga Danilović; Alexandra Panova	7–6^{(5)}, 6–3
Win	2–1	Apr 2024	Copa Colsanitas, Colombia	WTA 250	Clay	Kamilla Rakhimova	(Hungary) Anna Bondár; Irina Khromacheva	7–6^{(5)}, 3–6, [10–8]
Win	3–1	May 2024	Madrid Open, Spain	WTA 1000	Clay	(Spain) Sara Sorribes Tormo	(Czech Republic) Barbora Krejčíková (Germany) Laura Siegemund	6–0, 6–2
Win	4–1	May 2024	Internationaux de Strasbourg, France	WTA 500	Clay	(Romania) Monica Niculescu	(United States) Asia Muhammad (Indonesia) Aldila Sutjiadi	3–6, 6–4, [10–6]
Win	5–1	Aug 2024	Tennis in Cleveland, US	WTA 250	Hard	(China) Xu Yifan	(Japan) Shuko Aoyama (Japan) Eri Hozumi	3–6, 6–3, [10–6]
Loss	5–2	Oct 2024	Japan Women's Open, Japan	WTA 250	Hard	(Romania) Monica Niculescu	(Germany) Laura Siegemund (Japan) Ena Shibahara	6–3, 2–6, [2–10]
Loss	5–3	Mar 2025	Miami Open, United States	WTA 1000	Hard	(Japan) Miyu Kato	Mirra Andreeva; Diana Shnaider	3–6, 7–6^{(5)}, [2–10]
Win	6–3	Mar 2025	Copa Colsanitas, Colombia (2)	WTA 250	Clay	(Spain) Sara Sorribes Tormo	(Romania) Irina Bara (Brazil) Laura Pigossi	5–7, 6–2, [10–5]
Win	7–3	Aug 2025	Monterrey Open, Mexico	WTA 500	Hard	(United States) Nicole Melichar-Martinez	(China) Guo Hanyu; Alexandra Panova	6–2, 6–0
Loss	7–4	Jan 2026	Brisbane International, Australia	WTA 500	Hard	(Australia) Ellen Perez	(Chinese Taipei) Hsieh Su-wei (Latvia) Jeļena Ostapenko	2–6, 1–6
Win	8–4	Mar 2026	Mérida Open, Mexico	WTA 500	Hard	(China) Jiang Xinyu	(Netherlands) Isabelle Haverlag (United Kingdom) Maia Lumsden	6–4, 6–1
Loss	8–5	May 2026	Italian Open, Italy	WTA 1000	Clay	(United States) Nicole Melichar-Martinez	Mirra Andreeva; Diana Shnaider	3–6, 3–6
Win	9–5	Sep 2026	Guadalajara Open, Mexico	WTA 500	Hard	(United States) Nicole Melichar-Martinez	(Japan) Momoko Kobori (Thailand) Peangtarn Plipuech	6–2, 5–7, [10–5]
Loss	9–6	Oct 2026	Ningbo Open, China	WTA 500	Hard	(United States) Nicole Melichar-Martinez	(United States) Desirae Krawczyk (Hungary) Fanny Stollar	6^{(5)}–7, 7–5, [6–10]

== WTA 125 finals ==
=== Singles: 1 (title) ===
Result	Date	Tournament	Surface	Opponent	Score
Win	Dec 2023	Open de Limoges, France	Hard (i)	(France) Elsa Jacquemot	2–6, 6–1, 6–2

=== Doubles: 8 (6 titles, 2 runner-ups) ===
Result	W–L	Date	Tournament	Surface	Partner	Opponents	Score
Loss	0–1	Aug 2021	Concord Open, US	Hard	(United States) Usue Maitane Arconada	(Thailand) Peangtarn Plipuech (Indonesia) Jessy Rompies	6–3, 6–7^{(5–7)}, [8–10]
Win	1–1	Dec 2022	Andorrà Open, Andorra	Hard (i)	(Poland) Weronika Falkowska	(Russia) Angelina Gabueva (Russia) Anastasia Zakharova	7–6^{(7–4)}, 6–1
Win	2–1	Jul 2023	Contrexéville Open, France	Clay	(Russia) Alena Fomina-Klotz	(Russia) Amina Anshba (Czech Republic) Anastasia Dețiuc	4–6, 6–3, [10–7]
Loss	2–2	Aug 2023	Chicago Challenger, United States	Hard	(Russia) Alexandra Panova	(Norway) Ulrikke Eikeri (Estonia) Ingrid Neel	walkover
Win	3–2	Dec 2023	Open Angers, France	Hard (i)	(Romania) Monica Niculescu	(Kazakhstan) Anna Danilina; Alexandra Panova	6–1, 6–3
Win	4–2	Dec 2023	Open de Limoges, France	Hard (i)	(Russia) Yana Sizikova	(Georgia (country)) Oksana Kalashnikova (United Kingdom) Maia Lumsden	6–4, 6–1
Win	5–2	Jun 2025	Birmingham Open, UK	Grass	(Australia) Destanee Aiava	(United Kingdom) Alicia Barnett (France) Elixane Lechemia	6–4, 6–2
Win	6–2	Dec 2025	Open de Limoges, France	Hard (i)	(China) Zhang Shuai	(France) Elsa Jacquemot (France) Jessika Ponchet	6–3, 6–1

== ITF Circuit finals ==
=== Singles: 9 (4 titles, 5 runner-ups) ===
Legend
$60,000 tournaments (1–1)
$25,000 tournaments (2–1)
$10/15,000 tournaments (1–3)

Result	W–L	Date	Tournament	Tier	Surface	Opponent	Score
Loss	0–1	Feb 2015	ITF Palma Nova, Spain	10,000	Clay	(United Kingdom) Amanda Carreras	5–7, 0–6
Loss	0–2	Sep 2016	ITF Madrid, Spain	10,000	Hard	(Spain) Nuria Párrizas Díaz	4–6, 6–3, 5–7
Win	1–2	May 2017	ITF Santarém, Portugal	15,000	Hard	(Russia) Valeria Savinykh	6–4, 6–4
Win	2–2	Jul 2018	ITF Porto, Portugal	25,000	Clay	(Switzerland) Jil Teichmann	7–6^{(4)}, 6–1
Loss	2–3	Nov 2018	ITF Nules, Spain	15,000	Clay	(Italy) Elisabetta Cocciaretto	2–6, 6–7^{(2)}
Loss	2–4	May 2019	ITF Monzón, Spain	25,000	Clay	(Argentina) Nadia Podoroska	2–6, 6–4, 2–6
Win	3–4	Jul 2019	ITF Vitoria-Gasteiz, Spain	25,000	Hard	(Belarus) Shalimar Talbi	6–0, 6–4
Win	4–4	Nov 2019	Open Nantes, France	60,000	Hard (i)	(Germany) Tamara Korpatsch	6–2, 6–7^{(11)}, 7–6^{(6)}
Loss	4–5	Sep 2020	Open de Saint-Malo, France	60,000	Clay	(Argentina) Nadia Podoroska	6–4, 5–7, 2–6

=== Doubles: 19 (9 titles, 10 runner-ups) ===
Legend
$80,000 tournaments (1–1)
$60,000 tournaments (1–0)
$25,000 tournaments (6–5)
$10,000 tournaments (1–4)

Result	W–L	Date	Tournament	Tier	Surface	Partner	Opponents	Score
Loss	0–1	May 2015	ITF Pula, Italy	10,000	Clay	(Spain) Eva Guerrero Álvarez	(Australia) Priscilla Hon (Spain) Aliona Bolsova	0–6, 3–6
Loss	0–2	May 2017	ITF Santarém, Portugal	10,000	Hard	(Russia) Ksenia Kuznetsova	(Russia) Valeria Savinykh (Ukraine) Valeriya Strakhova	3–6, 2–6
Loss	0–3	Jul 2017	ITF Getxo, Spain	25,000	Clay	(Bolivia) Noelia Zeballos	(Venezuela) Andrea Gámiz (Bulgaria) Aleksandrina Naydenova	2–6, 4–6
Loss	0–4	Sep 2017	ITF Middelkerke, Belgium	10,000	Clay	(Romania) Cristina Adamescu	(France) Sara Cakarevic (Belgium) Magali Kempen	4–6, 6–4, [5–10]
Loss	0–5	Sep 2017	Open de Biarritz, France	80,000	Clay	(Australia) Isabelle Wallace	(Romania) Irina Bara (Romania) Mihaela Buzărnescu	3–6, 1–6
Loss	0–6	Nov 2017	ITF Benicar, Spain	10,000	Clay	(France) Elixane Lechemia	(Spain) Noelia Bouzó Zanotti (Spain) Ángeles Moreno Barranquero	3–6, 4–6
Win	1–6	Nov 2017	Open de Valencia, Spain	25,000	Clay	(Russia) Yana Sizikova	(Spain) Georgina García Pérez (Venezuela) Andrea Gámiz	7–6^{(1)}, 7–6^{(5)}
Win	2–6	May 2018	ITF Monzón, Spain	25,000	Hard	(Russia) Yana Sizikova	(United Kingdom) Sarah Beth Grey (United Kingdom) Olivia Nicholls	6–2, 5–7, [10–8]
Loss	2–7	Jun 2018	ITF Périgueux, France	25,000	Clay	(Colombia) María Herazo González	(Greece) Eleni Kordolaimi (France) Elixane Lechemia	4–6, 6–3, [9–11]
Loss	2–8	Jul 2018	ITF Porto, Portugal	25,000	Clay	(Japan) Ramu Ueda	(Paraguay) Montserrat González (Brazil) Laura Pigossi	5–7, 0–6
Win	3–8	Sep 2018	Open de Saint-Malo, France	60.000	Clay	(Colombia) María Herazo González	(Romania) Alexandra Cadanțu (Latvia) Diāna Marcinkēviča	4–6, 6–1, [10–8]
Loss	3–9	Oct 2018	ITF Óbidos, Portugal	25,000	Carpet	(Latvia) Diāna Marcinkēviča	(Netherlands) Michaëlla Krajicek (United States) Ingrid Neel	2–6, 2–6
Win	4–9	Nov 2018	ITF Nules, Spain	10,000	Clay	(Spain) Claudia Hoste Ferrer	(Spain) Marina Bassols Ribera (Spain) Júlia Payola	7–6^{(3)}, 6–3
Win	5–9	Feb 2018	AK Ladies Open, Germany	25,000	Carpet (i)	(Netherlands) Rosalie van der Hoek	(Belgium) Marie Benoît (Poland) Katarzyna Piter	5–7, 6–3, [12–10]
Win	6–9	Apr 2019	ITF Óbidos, Portugal	25,000	Carpet	(Spain) Georgina García Pérez	(Georgia (country)) Sofia Shapatava (United Kingdom) Emily Webley-Smith	7–5, 7–5
Win	7–9	Apr 2019	Chiasso Open, Switzerland	25,000	Clay	(Ukraine) Marta Kostyuk	(Canada) Sharon Fichman (Australia) Jaimee Fourlis	6–1, 3–6, [10–7]
Loss	7–10	Nov 2019	ITF Saint-Étienne, France	25,000	Hard (i)	(Germany) Julia Wachaczyk	(Russia) Marina Melnikova (Romania) Laura Ioana Paar	3–6, 7–6^{(7)}, [9–11]
Win	8–10	Mar 2022	ITF Le Havre, France	25,000	Clay	(Spain) Georgina García Pérez	(Latvia) Diāna Marcinkēviča (United States) Chiara Scholl	6–4, 6–3
Win	9–10	Nov 2022	Open de Valencia, Spain	80,000+H	Clay	(Switzerland) Ylena In-Albon	(Russia) Irina Khromacheva (Belarus) Iryna Shymanovich	6–3, 6–2

== Wins against top 10 players ==
- Bucșa has a 1–10 record against players who were, at the time the match was played, ranked in the top 10.

No.	Player	Rk	Event	Surface	Rd	Score	Rk	Years	Ref
1	(Italy) Jasmine Paolini	7	Mérida Open, Mexico	Hard	SF	7–5, 6–4	63	2026	

- Key: (Rk) first use, opponent rank; (Rd) round; (Rk) 2nd use, player rank; (Ref) reference; (F) final; (SF) semifinal; (QF) quarterfinal; (#R) rounds 4, 3, 2, 1; (RR) round-robin stage; (Q#) qualifying rounds or stages (3), 2, 1.
