= 2025 Mérida Open – Singles =

Singles
- 2025 Mérida Open

Final
- Champion: (United States) Emma Navarro
- Runner-up: (Colombia) Emiliana Arango
- Score: 6–0, 6–0

Details
- Draw: 28
- Seeds: 8

Events
| Singles | Doubles |
| ← 2024 · | Mérida Open | · 2026 → |

Emma Navarro defeated Emiliana Arango in the final, 6–0, 6–0 to win the singles title at the 2025 Mérida Open. She did not drop a set en route to her second WTA Tour title and first WTA 500 title. She became the fifth player to win a WTA final with a 'double bagel' scoreline since 2000, and the first since Iga Świątek defeated Karolína Plíšková at the 2021 Italian Open.

Zeynep Sönmez was the defending champion, but lost in the quarterfinals to Navarro.

== Seeds ==
The top four seeds received a bye into the second round.

1. (United States) Emma Navarro (champion)
2. (Spain) Paula Badosa (quarterfinals, retired)
3. (Brazil) Beatriz Haddad Maia (second round)
4. Anna Kalinskaya (withdrew)
5. (Croatia) Donna Vekić (second round)
6. (Ukraine) Marta Kostyuk (first round)
7. (Poland) Magdalena Fręch (first round)
8. (Greece) Maria Sakkari (first round)

== Draw ==
=== Key ===
- Q = Qualifier
- WC = Wild card
- LL = Lucky loser
- Alt = Alternate
- ITF = ITF entry
- PR = Protected ranking
- SR = Special ranking
- SE = Special exempt
- JE = Junior exempt
- JR = Junior Accelerator Programme entrant
- CO = College Accelerator Programme entrant
- NG = Next Gen Accelerator Program entrant
- w/o = Walkover
- r = Retired
- d = Defaulted

=== Finals ===
Semifinals
1 | (United States) Emma Navarro | 6 | 6
(Armenia) Elina Avanesyan | 3 | 3
Q | (Colombia) Emiliana Arango | 6 | 4 | 6
Q | (Australia) Daria Saville | 3 | 6 | 2

Final
1 | (United States) Emma Navarro | 6 | 6
Q | (Colombia) Emiliana Arango | 0 | 0

=== Top half ===
First round
WC | (United States) S Stephens | 2 | 3
Q | (Croatia) P Martić | 6 | 6
(Poland) M Linette | 6 | 6
(Italy) E Cocciaretto | 4 | 0
WC | (Turkey) Z Sönmez | 7 | 6
8 | (Greece) M Sakkari | 5 | 2
Q | (Australia) M Joint | 6 | 6
PR | (Austria) J Grabher | 3 | 2
(Spain) J Bouzas Maneiro | 7 | 5 | 7
WC | (Slovakia) R Jamrichová | 5 | 7 | 5
(Armenia) E Avanesyan | 4 | 6 | 6
7 | (Poland) M Fręch | 6 | 3 | 3

Second round
1 | (United States) E Navarro | 6 | 6
Q | (Croatia) P Martić | 1 | 2
(Poland) M Linette | 3 | 1^{r}
WC | (Turkey) Z Sönmez | 6 | 3
5 | (Croatia) D Vekić | 1 | 2
Q | (Australia) M Joint | 6 | 6
(Spain) J Bouzas Maneiro | 1 | 4
(Armenia) E Avanesyan | 6 | 6

Quarterfinals
1 | (United States) E Navarro | 6 | 6
WC | (Turkey) Z Sönmez | 4 | 2
Q | (Australia) M Joint | 6 | 2 | 0
(Armenia) E Avanesyan | 4 | 6 | 6

Semifinals
1 | (United States) E Navarro | 6 | 6
(Armenia) E Avanesyan | 3 | 3

=== Bottom half ===
First round
LL | (Argentina) ML Carlé | 2 | 3
Q | (Colombia) E Arango | 6 | 6
(Egypt) M Sherif | 4 | 0^{r}
Q | (United Kingdom) F Jones | 6 | 3
(Slovakia) R Šramková | 6 | 6
(New Zealand) L Sun | 3 | 1
6 | (Ukraine) M Kostyuk | 4 | 6^{6}
Q | (Australia) D Saville | 6 | 7^{8}
(Ukraine) A Kalinina | 6 | 1 | 6
Q | (France) L Jeanjean | 4 | 6 | 1
(Romania) J Cristian | 6 | 4
LL | (Ukraine) Y Starodubtseva | 4 | 1^{r}

Second round
Q | (Colombia) E Arango | 3 | 6 | 3
Q | (United Kingdom) F Jones | 6 | 3 | 4^{r}
(Slovakia) R Šramková | 7^{10} | 6
3 | (Brazil) B Haddad Maia | 6^{8} | 3
Q | (Australia) D Saville | 4 | 6 | 6
(Ukraine) A Kalinina | 6 | 2 | 2
(Romania) J Cristian | 2 | 1
2 | (Spain) P Badosa | 6 | 6

Quarterfinals
Q | (Colombia) E Arango | 5 | 6 | 6
(Slovakia) R Šramková | 7 | 3 | 0
Q | (Australia) D Saville | 1 | 5
2 | (Spain) P Badosa | 6 | 3^{r}

Semifinals
Q | (Colombia) E Arango | 6 | 4 | 6
Q | (Australia) D Saville | 3 | 6 | 2

== Qualifying ==
=== Seeds ===
1. (Argentina) María Lourdes Carlé (qualifying competition, lucky loser)
2. (Romania) Anca Todoni (first round)
3. (Australia) Maya Joint (qualified)
4. (Ukraine) Yuliia Starodubtseva (qualifying competition, lucky loser)
5. (Croatia) Petra Martić (qualified)
6. (Australia) Daria Saville (qualified)
7. (France) Léolia Jeanjean (qualified)
8. (United States) Varvara Lepchenko (qualifying competition)
9. (Colombia) Emiliana Arango (qualified)
10. (United Kingdom) Francesca Jones (qualified)
11. (Japan) Nao Hibino (first round)
12. (Argentina) Solana Sierra (qualifying competition)

=== Qualifiers ===
1. (Colombia) Emiliana Arango
2. (United Kingdom) Francesca Jones
3. (Australia) Maya Joint
4. (France) Léolia Jeanjean
5. (Croatia) Petra Martić
6. (Australia) Daria Saville

=== Lucky losers ===
1. (Argentina) María Lourdes Carlé
2. (Ukraine) Yuliia Starodubtseva

=== Qualifying draw ===
==== First qualifier ====
First round
1 | (Argentina) María Lourdes Carlé | 6 | 6
WC | (Mexico) Victoria Rodríguez | 3 | 2
(Poland) Katarzyna Kawa | 5 | 2
9 | (Colombia) Emiliana Arango | 7 | 6

Qualifying competition
1 | (Argentina) María Lourdes Carlé | 2 | 7 | 2
9 | (Colombia) Emiliana Arango | 6 | 5 | 6

==== Second qualifier ====
First round
2 | (Romania) Anca Todoni | 3 | 6^{2}
(Switzerland) Leonie Küng | 6 | 7^{7}
WC | (Mexico) Ana Sofía Sánchez | 0 | 1
10 | (United Kingdom) Francesca Jones | 6 | 6

Qualifying competition
(Switzerland) Leonie Küng | 6 | 3 | 2
10 | (United Kingdom) Francesca Jones | 3 | 6 | 6

==== Third qualifier ====
First round
3 | (Australia) Maya Joint | 6 | 6
(United States) Emina Bektas | 2 | 3
(Czech Republic) Linda Fruhvirtová | 6 | 6^{3} | 3
12 | (Argentina) Solana Sierra | 2 | 7^{7} | 6

Qualifying competition
3 | (Australia) Maya Joint | 6 | 6
12 | (Argentina) Solana Sierra | 1 | 1

==== Fourth qualifier ====
First round
4 | (Ukraine) Yuliia Starodubtseva | 6 | 6
WC | (Greece) Dimitra Pavlou | 4 | 3
(Australia) Astra Sharma | 6 | 5 | 1
7 | (France) Léolia Jeanjean | 4 | 7 | 6

Qualifying competition
4 | (Ukraine) Yuliia Starodubtseva | 1 | 4
7 | (France) Léolia Jeanjean | 6 | 6

==== Fifth qualifier ====
First round
5 | (Croatia) Petra Martić | 7 | 6
Alt | (Bulgaria) Lia Karatancheva | 5 | 4
(United States) Hanna Chang | 6 | 6
11 | (Japan) Nao Hibino | 1 | 4

Qualifying competition
5 | (Croatia) Petra Martić | 6 | 6
(United States) Hanna Chang | 4 | 1

==== Sixth qualifier ====
First round
6 | (Australia) Daria Saville | 7^{7} | 6
WC | (Australia) Ellen Perez | 6^{5} | 1
(Ukraine) Valeriya Strakhova | 3 | 1
8 | (United States) Varvara Lepchenko | 6 | 6

Qualifying competition
6 | (Australia) Daria Saville | 6 | 6
8 | (United States) Varvara Lepchenko | 2 | 1
