= 2024 Mérida Open =

- Date: 28 October – 3 November
- Category: WTA 250
- Draw: 32S / 16Q / 14D
- Surface: Hard (Outdoor)
- Location: Mérida, Yucatán, Mexico

Champions

Singles
- (Turkey) Zeynep Sönmez

Doubles
- (United States) Quinn Gleason / (Brazil) Ingrid Martins
← 2023 ·	Mérida Open	· 2025 →

The 2024 Mérida Open Akron was a WTA 250 tournament played on outdoor hardcourts as part of the 2024 WTA Tour. This was the second edition of the Mérida Open, which took place at the Yucatán Country Club in Mérida, Mexico, from 28 October to 3 November 2024.

== Champions ==
=== Singles ===
- (Turkey) Zeynep Sönmez def. (United States) Ann Li 6–2, 6–1

=== Doubles ===
- (United States) Quinn Gleason / (Brazil) Ingrid Martins def. (Belgium) Magali Kempen / (Belgium) Lara Salden 6–4, 6–4

== Singles main draw entrants ==
=== Seeds ===
Country	Player	Rank^{1}	Seed
MEX	Renata Zarazúa	71	1
ARG	Nadia Podoroska	76	2
AUS	Ajla Tomljanović	81	3
GER	Jule Niemeier	82	4
	Anna Blinkova	85	5
ARG	María Lourdes Carlé	87	6
GER	Tatjana Maria	95	7
ESP	Nuria Párrizas Díaz	97	8

- Rankings are as of 21 October 2024.

=== Other entrants ===
The following players received wildcards into the singles main draw:

- (Czech Republic) Laura Samson
- (Mexico) Ana Sofía Sánchez
- (United States) Akasha Urhobo

The following players received entry using a protected ranking:

- Alina Korneeva
- (Serbia) Nina Stojanović

The following players received entry from the qualifying draw:

- (Poland) Maja Chwalińska
- (United States) Elizabeth Mandlik
- Anastasia Tikhonova
- (Slovenia) Tamara Zidanšek

=== Withdrawals ===
- (Italy) Elisabetta Cocciaretto → replaced by (Italy) Lucrezia Stefanini
- (United States) McCartney Kessler → replaced by (Turkey) Zeynep Sönmez
- (United States) Peyton Stearns → replaced by (France) Elsa Jacquemot
- (Croatia) Donna Vekić → replaced by (Canada) Marina Stakusic

== Doubles main draw entrants ==
=== Seeds ===
Country	Player	Country	Player	Rank^{†}	Seed
USA	Quinn Gleason	BRA	Ingrid Martins	223	1
USA	Jessie Aney	USA	Carmen Corley	245	2
	Anastasia Tikhonova	MEX	Renata Zarazúa	288	3
ARG	María Lourdes Carlé	NED	Eva Vedder	290	4

- ^{1} Rankings as of 21 October 2024.

=== Other entrants ===
The following pair received a wildcard into the doubles main draw:

- (Poland) Maja Chwalińska / (Croatia) Antonia Ružić
