= 2023 Mérida Open – Singles =

Singles
- 2023 Mérida Open

Final
- Champion: (Italy) Camila Giorgi
- Runner-up: (Sweden) Rebecca Peterson
- Score: 7–6^{(7–3)}, 1–6, 6–2

Details
- Draw: 32
- Seeds: 8

Events
Singles	Doubles
Mérida Open	· 2024 →

Camila Giorgi defeated Rebecca Peterson in the final, 7–6^{(7–3)}, 1–6, 6–2 to win the singles tennis title at the 2023 Mérida Open.

This was the first edition of the tournament.

== Seeds ==
1. (Poland) Magda Linette (quarterfinals)
2. (United States) Sloane Stephens (quarterfinals)
3. (China) Zhu Lin (first round)
4. (Czech Republic) Kateřina Siniaková (semifinals)
5. (United States) Alycia Parks (second round)
6. (Egypt) Mayar Sherif (first round)
7. (Italy) Elisabetta Cocciaretto (quarterfinals)
8. (United States) Alison Riske-Amritraj (first round)

== Draw ==
=== Key ===
- Q = Qualifier
- WC = Wild card
- LL = Lucky loser
- Alt = Alternate
- SE = Special exempt
- PR = Protected ranking
- ITF = ITF entry
- JE = Junior exempt
- w/o = Walkover
- r = Retired
- d = Defaulted
- SR = Special ranking

=== Finals ===
Semifinals
Q	(Sweden) Rebecca Peterson	6	6^{4}	6
(United States) Caty McNally	2	7^{7}	4
4	(Czech Republic) Kateřina Siniaková	5	6^{2}
(Italy) Camila Giorgi	7	7^{7}

Final
Q	(Sweden) Rebecca Peterson	6^{3}	6	2
(Italy) Camila Giorgi	7^{7}	1	6

=== Top half ===
First round
1	(Poland) M Linette	6^{2}	7	6
(Colombia) C Osorio	7^{7}	5	2
(Germany) J Niemeier	6^{1}	6^{5}
(Hungary) P Udvardy	7^{7}	7^{7}
PR	(Argentina) N Podoroska	3	5
Q	(Sweden) R Peterson	6	7
WC	(Mexico) F Contreras Gómez	6^{7}	6	5
5	(United States) A Parks	7^{9}	3	7
3	(China) L Zhu	6^{3}	7^{7}	1
(United States) C McNally	7^{7}	6^{5}	6
WC	(United States) K Volynets	4	6	6
(Italy) L Bronzetti	6	2	1
Q	(Australia) K Birrell	7^{10}	6
(Hungary) A Bondár	6^{8}	1
(China) Xiy Wang	7	4	7^{7}
8	(United States) A Riske-Amritraj	5	6	6^{1}

Second round
1	(Poland) M Linette	6	2
(Hungary) P Udvardy	0	5^{r}
Q	(Sweden) R Peterson	6	6
5	(United States) A Parks	4	2
(United States) C McNally	6	6
WC	(United States) K Volynets	3	0
Q	(Australia) K Birrell	6	6
(China) Xiy Wang	3	2

Quarterfinals
1	(Poland) M Linette	2	4
Q	(Sweden) R Peterson	6	6
(United States) C McNally	6	6
Q	(Australia) K Birrell	4	3

Semifinals
Q	(Sweden) R Peterson	6	6^{4}	6
(United States) C McNally	2	7^{7}	4

=== Bottom half ===
First round
7	(Italy) E Cocciaretto	6	6
(Switzerland) V Golubic	0	3
Q	E Avanesyan	6	2	3
(China) Xin Wang	1	6	6
WC	(Switzerland) S Waltert	6	5	1
(Belgium) Y Bonaventure	4	7	6
Q	(Ukraine) L Tsurenko	5	0^{r}
4	(Czech Republic) K Siniaková	7	0
6	(Egypt) M Sherif	4	2
(Italy) C Giorgi	6	6
(Spain) N Párrizas Díaz	6	6^{2}	6
Q	(Croatia) A Konjuh	4	7^{7}	2
(Germany) T Maria	6	4	2
LL	V Gracheva	3	6	6
Q	(France) L Jeanjean	1	3
2	(United States) S Stephens	6	6

Second round
7	(Italy) E Cocciaretto	6	6
(China) Xin Wang	4	2
(Belgium) Y Bonaventure	0	5
4	(Czech Republic) K Siniaková	6	7
(Italy) C Giorgi	7^{7}	6
(Spain) N Párrizas Díaz	6^{5}	2
LL	V Gracheva	7	2	6^{5}
2	(United States) S Stephens	5	6	7^{7}

Quarterfinals
7	(Italy) E Cocciaretto	1	7	0
4	(Czech Republic) K Siniaková	6	5	6
(Italy) C Giorgi	6	6
2	(United States) S Stephens	0	0

Semifinals
4	(Czech Republic) K Siniaková	5	6^{2}
(Italy) C Giorgi	7	7^{7}

== Qualifying ==
=== Seeds ===
1. Varvara Gracheva (qualifying competition, lucky loser)
2. (Slovakia) Anna Karolína Schmiedlová (first round)
3. (Ukraine) Lesia Tsurenko (qualified)
4. (Brazil) Laura Pigossi (qualifying competition)
5. (France) Léolia Jeanjean (qualified)
6. (France) Diane Parry (first round)
7. (Spain) Marina Bassols Ribera (first round)
8. (Italy) Lucrezia Stefanini (qualifying competition)
9. Erika Andreeva (qualifying competition)
10. (United States) Emma Navarro (withdrew)
11. (United States) CoCo Vandeweghe (first round, retired)
12. (Australia) Kimberly Birrell (qualified)

=== Qualifiers ===
1. (Australia) Kimberly Birrell
2. (Croatia) Ana Konjuh
3. (Ukraine) Lesia Tsurenko
4. Elina Avanesyan
5. (France) Léolia Jeanjean
6. (Sweden) Rebecca Peterson

=== Lucky loser ===
1. Varvara Gracheva

=== Qualifying draw ===
==== First qualifier ====
First round
1	Varvara Gracheva	6	6
WC	(Colombia) Emiliana Arango	1	2
(United States) Elizabeth Mandlik	4	3
12	(Australia) Kimberly Birrell	6	6

Qualifying competition
1	Varvara Gracheva	3	3
12	(Australia) Kimberly Birrell	6	6

==== Second qualifier ====
First round
2	(Slovakia) Anna Karolína Schmiedlová	1	2
(Spain) Aliona Bolsova	6	6
(Croatia) Ana Konjuh	7	7
7	(Spain) Marina Bassols Ribera	5	5

Qualifying competition
(Spain) Aliona Bolsova	2	3
(Croatia) Ana Konjuh	6	6

==== Third qualifier ====
First round
3	(Ukraine) Lesia Tsurenko	6	6
WC	(United States) Caroline Dolehide	2	4
(Argentina) María Lourdes Carlé	0	6^{1}
8	(Italy) Lucrezia Stefanini	6	7^{7}

Qualifying competition
3	(Ukraine) Lesia Tsurenko	4	6	7
8	(Italy) Lucrezia Stefanini	6	3	5

==== Fourth qualifier ====
First round
4	(Brazil) Laura Pigossi	6	6
WC	(Mexico) María Fernanda Navarro	4	3
(Japan) Nao Hibino	6	3	3
Alt	Elina Avanesyan	4	6	6

Qualifying competition
4	(Brazil) Laura Pigossi	6	1	3
Alt	Elina Avanesyan	2	6	6

==== Fifth qualifier ====
First round
5	(France) Léolia Jeanjean	7	1	6
(Greece) Despina Papamichail	5	6	3
WC	(Mexico) Lya Isabel Fernández Olivares	1	0
9	Erika Andreeva	6	6

Qualifying competition
5	(France) Léolia Jeanjean	5	6	6
9	Erika Andreeva	7	4	4

==== Sixth qualifier ====
First round
6	(France) Diane Parry	1	6^{5}
(Sweden) Rebecca Peterson	6	7^{7}
Alt	(Canada) Carol Zhao	7^{8}	3
11	(United States) CoCo Vandeweghe	6^{6}	0^{r}

Qualifying competition
(Sweden) Rebecca Peterson	7^{7}	4	6
Alt	(Canada) Carol Zhao	6^{5}	6	4
