= 2025 Mérida Open =

- Date: 24 February – 2 March
- Category: WTA 500
- Draw: 28S / 24Q / 16D
- Surface: Hard (Outdoor)
- Location: Mérida, Yucatán, Mexico

Champions

Singles
- (United States) Emma Navarro

Doubles
- (Poland) Katarzyna Piter / (Egypt) Mayar Sherif
- Mérida Open

The 2025 Mérida Open Akron was a WTA 500 tournament played on outdoor hardcourts as part of the 2025 WTA Tour. This was the third edition of the Mérida Open, which took place at the Yucatán Country Club in Mérida, Mexico, from 24 February to 2 March 2025. It was originally scheduled to take place from 27 October to 2 November 2025 as a WTA 250, but got upgraded to a WTA 500 status and moved to its new date to fill the vacancy generated by the cancellation of the San Diego Open.

== Champions ==
=== Singles ===
- (United States) Emma Navarro def. (Colombia) Emiliana Arango 6–0, 6–0

=== Doubles ===
- (Poland) Katarzyna Piter / (Egypt) Mayar Sherif def. (Kazakhstan) Anna Danilina / Irina Khromacheva 7–6^{(7–2)}, 7–5

== Singles main draw entrants ==
=== Seeds ===
Country	Player	Rank^{1}	Seed
USA	Emma Navarro	9	1
ESP	Paula Badosa	10	2
BRA	Beatriz Haddad Maia	16	3
	~~Anna Kalinskaya~~	~~19~~	~~4~~
CRO	Donna Vekić	20	5
UKR	Marta Kostyuk	21	6
POL	Magdalena Fręch	28	7
GRE	Maria Sakkari	29	8

- Rankings are as of 17 February 2025.

=== Other entrants ===
The following players received wildcards into the singles main draw:

- (Slovakia) Renáta Jamrichová
- ~~Anna Kalinskaya~~
- (Turkey) Zeynep Sönmez
- (United States) Sloane Stephens

The following player received entry using a protected ranking:

- (Austria) Julia Grabher

The following players received entry from the qualifying draw:

- (Colombia) Emiliana Arango
- (France) Léolia Jeanjean
- (Australia) Maya Joint
- (United Kingdom) Francesca Jones
- (Croatia) Petra Martić
- (Australia) Daria Saville

The following players received entry as lucky losers:

- (Argentina) María Lourdes Carlé
- (Ukraine) Yuliia Starodubtseva

=== Withdrawals ===
- (Czech Republic) Marie Bouzková → replaced by (Italy) Elisabetta Cocciaretto
- Anna Kalinskaya → replaced by (Argentina) María Lourdes Carlé
- Polina Kudermetova → replaced by (Egypt) Mayar Sherif
- Veronika Kudermetova → replaced by (Romania) Jaqueline Cristian
- (Colombia) Camila Osorio → replaced by (Ukraine) Yuliia Starodubtseva

== Doubles main draw entrants ==
=== Seeds ===
Country	Player	Country	Player	Rank^{†}	Seed
KAZ	Anna Danilina		Irina Khromacheva	35	1
	Alexandra Panova	AUS	Ellen Perez	38	2
HUN	Tímea Babos	USA	Nicole Melichar-Martinez	47	3
NOR	Ulrikke Eikeri	JPN	Makoto Ninomiya	100	4

- ^{1} Rankings as of 17 February 2025.

=== Other entrants ===
The following pair received a wildcard into the doubles main draw:

- (Greece) Dimitra Pavlou / (Greece) Maria Sakkari
