= 2023 Mérida Open =

- Date: 20–26 February
- Edition: 1st
- Category: WTA 250
- Draw: 32S / 24Q / 16D
- Prize money: $259,303
- Surface: Hard (Outdoor)
- Location: Mérida, Yucatán, Mexico

Champions

Singles
- (Italy) Camila Giorgi

Doubles
- (United States) Caty McNally / (France) Diane Parry
Mérida Open	· 2024 →

The 2023 Mérida Open Akron was a WTA 250 tournament organised for female professional tennis players on outdoor hardcourts as part of the 2023 WTA Tour. The event took place at the Yucatán Country Club in Mérida, Mexico, from 20 through 26 February 2023 as a replacement for Abierto Zapopan. The tournament was the first of its class in the city of Mérida. The main sponsor of the tournament was AKRON, and it was organized with a team formed by WTA representatives and GSSPORTS management; a Mexican enterprise dedicated to conducting and directing this event under the lead of tournament director Gustavo Santoscoy.

== Champions ==
=== Singles ===
- (Italy) Camila Giorgi def. (Sweden) Rebecca Peterson, 7–6^{(7–3)}, 1–6, 6–2

=== Doubles ===
- (United States) Caty McNally / (France) Diane Parry def. (China) Wang Xinyu / (Chinese Taipei) Wu Fang-hsien, 6–0, 7–5

== Points and prize money ==
=== Point distribution ===
Event	W	F	SF	QF	Round of 16	Round of 32	Q	Q2	Q1
Singles	280	180	110	60	30	1	18	12	1
Doubles	280	180	110	60	1	—	—	—	—

=== Prize money ===
Event	W	F	SF	QF	Round of 16	Round of 32	Q2	Q1
Women's singles	$34,228	$20,226	$11,275	$6,418	$3,922	$2,804	$2,075	$1,340
Women's doubles	$12,447	$7,000	$4,020	$2,400	$1,848	—	—	—

== Singles main draw entrants ==
=== Seeds ===
Country	Player	Rank^{1}	Seed
POL	Magda Linette	21	1
USA	Sloane Stephens	40	2
CHN	Zhu Lin	41	3
CZE	Kateřina Siniaková	47	4
USA	Alycia Parks	51	5
EGY	Mayar Sherif	53	6
ITA	Elisabetta Cocciaretto	54	7
USA	Alison Riske-Amritraj	58	8

- Rankings are as of February 13, 2023.

=== Other entrants ===
The following players received wildcards into the singles main draw:

- (Mexico) Fernanda Contreras Gómez
- (United States) Katie Volynets
- (Switzerland) Simona Waltert

The following player received entry using a protected ranking into the singles main draw:

- (Argentina) Nadia Podoroska

The following players received entry from the qualifying draw:

- Elina Avanesyan
- (Australia) Kimberly Birrell
- (France) Léolia Jeanjean
- (Croatia) Ana Konjuh
- (Sweden) Rebecca Peterson
- (Ukraine) Lesia Tsurenko

The following player received entry as a lucky loser:

- Varvara Gracheva

=== Withdrawals ===
Before the tournament

- (Ukraine) Kateryna Baindl → replaced by Varvara Gracheva
- (Hungary) Dalma Gálfi → replaced by (Belgium) Ysaline Bonaventure
- (Croatia) Donna Vekić → replaced by (Hungary) Panna Udvardy

== Doubles main draw entrants ==
=== Seeds ===
Country	Player	Country	Player	Rank^{†}	Seed
GBR	Alicia Barnett	GBR	Olivia Nicholls	129	1
USA	Kaitlyn Christian	USA	Sabrina Santamaria	134	2
CZE	Anastasia Dețiuc	JPN	Eri Hozumi	136	3
CHN	Han Xinyun		Lidziya Marozava	137	4

- ^{1} Rankings as of February 13, 2023.

=== Other entrants ===
The following pairs received wildcards into the doubles main draw:

- (France) Estelle Cascino / (Czech Republic) Jesika Malečková
- (Greece) Despina Papamichail / (Switzerland) Simona Waltert
