= 2025 Mérida Open – Doubles =

Doubles
- 2025 Mérida Open

Final
- Champions: (Poland) Katarzyna Piter (Egypt) Mayar Sherif
- Runners-up: (Kazakhstan) Anna Danilina; Irina Khromacheva
- Score: 7–6^{(7–2)}, 7–5

Details
- Draw: 16
- Seeds: 4

Events
Singles	Doubles
← 2024 ·	Mérida Open	· 2026 →

Katarzyna Piter and Mayar Sherif defeated Anna Danilina and Irina Khromacheva in the final, 7–6^{(7–2)}, 7–5 to win the doubles title at the 2025 Mérida Open. It was the fourth WTA Tour doubles title for Piter and second for Sherif.

Quinn Gleason and Ingrid Martins were the reigning champions. but Martins did not participate this year. Gleason partnered Emily Appleton, but lost in the first round to Danilina and Khromacheva.

== Seeds ==
1. (Kazakhstan) Anna Danilina / Irina Khromacheva (final)
2. Alexandra Panova / (Australia) Ellen Perez (semifinals)
3. (Hungary) Tímea Babos / (United States) Nicole Melichar-Martinez (semifinals)
4. (Norway) Ulrikke Eikeri / (Japan) Makoto Ninomiya (first round)

== Draw ==
=== Key ===
- Q = Qualifier
- WC = Wild card
- LL = Lucky loser
- Alt = Alternate
- ITF = ITF entry
- PR = Protected ranking
- SR = Special ranking
- SE = Special exempt
- JE = Junior exempt
- JR = Junior Accelerator Programme entrant
- CO = College Accelerator Programme entrant
- NG = Next Gen Accelerator Program entrant
- w/o = Walkover
- r = Retired
- d = Defaulted

=== Draw ===
First round
1	(Kazakhstan) A Danilina; I Khromacheva	6	6
(United Kingdom) E Appleton (United States) Q Gleason	3	4
(Ukraine) M Kolb (Ukraine) N Kolb	6	1	[10]
(United States) H Giavara (United States) D Hewitt	4	6	[3]
3	(Hungary) T Babos (United States) N Melichar-Martinez	6	6
WC	(Greece) D Pavlou (Greece) M Sakkari	0	2
(Ukraine) V Strakhova (New Zealand) L Sun	6	5	[5]
(Mexico) V Rodríguez (Mexico) AS Sánchez	4	7	[10]
(Poland) K Piter (Egypt) M Sherif	6	6
(Slovakia) R Šramková (Ukraine) Y Starodubtseva	0	4
(Romania) J Cristian (Italy) A Moratelli	7	6
4	(Norway) U Eikeri (Japan) M Ninomiya	5	1
(Argentina) ML Carlé (Mexico) R Zarazúa	6	4	[7]
(United States) S Santamaria (China) Q Tang	2	6	[10]
(Armenia) E Avanesyan (United States) S Stephens	3	3
2	A Panova (Australia) E Perez	6	6

Quarterfinals
1	(Kazakhstan) A Danilina; I Khromacheva	6	3
(Ukraine) M Kolb (Ukraine) N Kolb	2	2^{r}
3	(Hungary) T Babos (United States) N Melichar-Martinez	6	6
(Mexico) V Rodríguez (Mexico) AS Sánchez	1	2
(Poland) K Piter (Egypt) M Sherif	7^{7}	6
(Romania) J Cristian (Italy) A Moratelli	6^{3}	4
(United States) S Santamaria (China) Q Tang	6	4	[8]
2	A Panova (Australia) E Perez	2	6	[10]

Semifinals
1	(Kazakhstan) A Danilina; I Khromacheva	3	7^{7}	[11]
3	(Hungary) T Babos (United States) N Melichar-Martinez	6	6^{4}	[9]
(Poland) K Piter (Egypt) M Sherif	6	6
2	A Panova (Australia) E Perez	2	3

Final
1	(Kazakhstan) A Danilina; I Khromacheva	6^{2}	5
(Poland) K Piter (Egypt) M Sherif	7^{7}	7
