= 2023 Mérida Open – Doubles =

Doubles
- 2023 Mérida Open

Final
- Champions: (United States) Caty McNally (France) Diane Parry
- Runners-up: (China) Wang Xinyu (Chinese Taipei) Wu Fang-hsien
- Score: 6–0, 7–5

Details
- Draw: 16
- Seeds: 4

Events
Singles	Doubles
Mérida Open	· 2024 →

Caty McNally and Diane Parry defeated Wang Xinyu and Wu Fang-hsien in the final, 6–0, 7–5 to win the doubles tennis title at the 2023 Mérida Open.

This was the first edition of the tournament.

== Seeds ==
1. (United Kingdom) Alicia Barnett / (United Kingdom) Olivia Nicholls (first round)
2. (United States) Kaitlyn Christian / (United States) Sabrina Santamaria (quarterfinals)
3. (Czech Republic) Anastasia Dețiuc / (Japan) Eri Hozumi (quarterfinals)
4. (China) Han Xinyun / Lidziya Marozava (first round)

== Draw ==
=== Key ===
- Q = Qualifier
- WC = Wild card
- LL = Lucky loser
- Alt = Alternate
- SE = Special exempt
- PR = Protected ranking
- ITF = ITF entry
- JE = Junior exempt
- w/o = Walkover
- r = Retired
- d = Defaulted
- SR = Special ranking

=== Draw ===
First round
1	(United Kingdom) A Barnett (United Kingdom) O Nicholls	1	6	[6]
(China) Xiy Wang (China) L Zhu	6	4	[10]
WC	(Greece) D Papamichail (Switzerland) S Waltert	6	2	[10]
(United States) I Neel (Netherlands) R van der Hoek	2	6	[5]
4	(China) X Han; L Marozava	4	6	[5]
(United States) C McNally (France) D Parry	6	3	[10]
(Switzerland) V Golubic (Hungary) P Udvardy	0	3
(Hungary) A Bondár (France) E Lechemia	6	6
(China) Xin Wang (Chinese Taipei) F-h Wu	7^{7}	7^{7}
(United States) A Parks (United States) S Stephens	6^{3}	6^{2}
WC	(France) E Cascino (Czech Republic) J Malečková	6^{7}	6	[8]
3	(Czech Republic) A Dețiuc (Japan) E Hozumi	7^{9}	3	[10]
(Italy) L Bronzetti (Egypt) M Sherif	1	3
(Georgia (country)) N Dzalamidze; K Rakhimova	6	6
(Venezuela) A Gámiz (Brazil) I Gamarra Martins	2	6^{6}
2	(United States) K Christian (United States) S Santamaria	6	7^{8}

Quarterfinals
(China) Xiy Wang (China) L Zhu	3	2
WC	(Greece) D Papamichail (Switzerland) S Waltert	6	6
(United States) C McNally (France) D Parry	6	7^{8}
(Hungary) A Bondár (France) E Lechemia	3	6^{6}
(China) Xin Wang (Chinese Taipei) F-h Wu	6	6
3	(Czech Republic) A Dețiuc (Japan) E Hozumi	3	4
(Georgia (country)) N Dzalamidze; K Rakhimova	6	6
2	(United States) K Christian (United States) S Santamaria	3	0

Semifinals
WC	(Greece) D Papamichail (Switzerland) S Waltert	4	6^{0}
(United States) C McNally (France) D Parry	6	7^{7}
(China) Xin Wang (Chinese Taipei) F-h Wu	w/o
(Georgia (country)) N Dzalamidze; K Rakhimova

Final
(United States) C McNally (France) D Parry	6	7
(China) Xin Wang (Chinese Taipei) F-h Wu	0	5
