= 2024 Mérida Open – Doubles =

Doubles
- 2024 Mérida Open

Final
- Champions: (United States) Quinn Gleason (Brazil) Ingrid Martins
- Runners-up: (Belgium) Magali Kempen (Belgium) Lara Salden
- Score: 6–4, 6–4

Details
- Draw: 14 (2 byes)
- Seeds: 4

Events
Singles	Doubles
← 2023 ·	Mérida Open	· 2025 →

Quinn Gleason and Ingrid Martins defeated Magali Kempen and Lara Salden in the final, 6–4, 6–4 to win the doubles title at the 2024 Mérida Open.

Caty McNally and Diane Parry were the reigning champions, but did not participate this year.

== Seeds ==
The top two seeds received a bye into the quarterfinals.

1. (United States) Quinn Gleason / (Brazil) Ingrid Martins (champions)
2. (United States) Jessie Aney / (United States) Carmen Corley (quarterfinals)
3. Anastasia Tikhonova / (Mexico) Renata Zarazúa (semifinals)
4. (Argentina) María Lourdes Carlé / (Netherlands) Eva Vedder (semifinals)

== Draw ==
=== Key ===
- Q = Qualifier
- WC = Wild card
- LL = Lucky loser
- Alt = Alternate
- ITF = ITF entry
- PR = Protected ranking
- SR = Special ranking
- SE = Special exempt
- JE = Junior exempt
- JR = Junior Accelerator Programme entrant
- CO = College Accelerator Programme entrant
- NG = Next Gen Accelerator Program entrant
- w/o = Walkover
- r = Retired
- d = Defaulted

=== Draw ===
First round
(United States) S Chang (Japan) H Kuwata	4	4
WC	(Poland) M Chwalińska (Croatia) A Ružić	6	6
4	(Argentina) ML Carlé (Netherlands) E Vedder	4	6	[13]
(Spain) A Herrero Liñana (Argentina) M Krywoj	6	0	[11]
(United States) V Lepchenko (United States) E Mandlik	6	3	[10]
PR	(Georgia (country)) O Kalashnikova (Serbia) N Stojanović	3	6	[5]
M Kononova; M Kozyreva	6	6
A Blinkova; A Korneeva	4	4
(Colombia) MP Pérez (United States) C Rosca	3	7^{7}	[4]
3	A Tikhonova (Mexico) R Zarazúa	6	6^{4}	[10]
(Belgium) M Kempen (Belgium) L Salden	6	6
(Mexico) V Rodríguez (Mexico) AS Sánchez	2	3

Quarterfinals
1	(United States) Q Gleason (Brazil) I Martins	7^{7}	6
WC	(Poland) M Chwalińska (Croatia) A Ružić	6^{4}	1
4	(Argentina) ML Carlé (Netherlands) E Vedder	6	6
(United States) V Lepchenko (United States) E Mandlik	3	4
M Kononova; M Kozyreva	5	6^{3}
3	A Tikhonova (Mexico) R Zarazúa	7	7^{7}
(Belgium) M Kempen (Belgium) L Salden	6	7^{9}
2	(United States) J Aney (United States) C Corley	4	6^{7}

Semifinals
1	(United States) Q Gleason (Brazil) I Martins	6	6
4	(Argentina) ML Carlé (Netherlands) E Vedder	0	1
3	A Tikhonova (Mexico) R Zarazúa	6	3	[5]
(Belgium) M Kempen (Belgium) L Salden	4	6	[10]

Final
1	(United States) Q Gleason (Brazil) I Martins	6	6
(Belgium) M Kempen (Belgium) L Salden	4	4
