= 2026 Mérida Open – Singles =

Singles
- 2026 Mérida Open

Final
- Champion: (Spain) Cristina Bucșa
- Runner-up: (Poland) Magdalena Fręch
- Score: 6–1, 4–6, 6–4

Details
- Draw: 28
- Seeds: 8

Events
| Singles | Doubles |
- Mérida Open

Cristina Bucșa defeated Magdalena Fręch in the final, 6–1, 4–6, 6–4 to win the singles tennis title at the 2026 Mérida Open. It was her first WTA Tour singles title.

Emma Navarro was the defending champion, but lost in the second round to Zhang Shuai.

== Seeds ==
The top four seeds received a bye into the second round.

1. (Italy) Jasmine Paolini (semifinals)
2. (United States) Emma Navarro (second round)
3. (United States) Ann Li (second round)
4. (Czech Republic) Marie Bouzková (quarterfinals)
5. (Ukraine) Dayana Yastremska (first round)
6. (Indonesia) Janice Tjen (first round)
7. (Spain) Jéssica Bouzas Maneiro (second round)
8. (Poland) Magda Linette (second round)

== Draw ==
Key

- Q = Qualifier
- WC = Wild card
- LL = Lucky loser
- Alt = Alternate
- ITF = ITF entry
- PR = Protected ranking
- SR = Special ranking
- SE = Special exempt
- JE = Junior exempt
- JR = Junior Accelerator Programme entrant
- CO = College Accelerator Programme entrant
- NG = Next Gen Accelerator Program entrant
- w/o = Walkover
- r = Retired
- d = Defaulted

=== Finals ===
Semifinals
1/WC | (Italy) Jasmine Paolini | 5 | 4
(Spain) Cristina Bucșa | 7 | 6
(Poland) Magdalena Fręch | 6 | 6^{6} | 6
Q | (China) Zhang Shuai | 2 | 7^{8} | 3

Final
(Spain) Cristina Bucșa | 6 | 4 | 6
(Poland) Magdalena Fręch | 1 | 6 | 4

=== Top half ===
First round
LL | (Australia) P Hon | 6 | 2 | 6
(Mexico) R Zarazúa | 2 | 6 | 4
WC | (United Kingdom) K Boulter | 6 | 6
(Brazil) B Haddad Maia | 4 | 4
(Colombia) C Osorio | 6 | 6
6 | (Indonesia) J Tjen | 4 | 3
Q | (Canada) C Brace | 2 | 0
(Turkey) Z Sönmez | 6 | 6
(Spain) C Bucșa | 6 | 6
(Croatia) D Vekić | 3 | 2
WC | (Canada) M Stakusic | 6 | 6
5 | (Ukraine) D Yastremska | 4 | 3

Second round
1/WC | (Italy) J Paolini | 6 | 6
LL | (Australia) P Hon | 0 | 2
WC | (United Kingdom) K Boulter | 6 | 0
(Colombia) C Osorio | 3 | 0^{r}
3 | (United States) A Li | 6 | 6^{7} | 4
(Turkey) Z Sönmez | 3 | 7^{9} | 6
(Spain) C Bucșa | 7^{7} | 6
WC | (Canada) M Stakusic | 6^{1} | 3

Quarterfinals
1/WC | (Italy) J Paolini | 0 | 6 | 6
WC | (United Kingdom) K Boulter | 6 | 3 | 3
(Turkey) Z Sönmez | 3 | 4
(Spain) C Bucșa | 6 | 6

Semifinals
1/WC | (Italy) J Paolini | 5 | 4
(Spain) C Bucșa | 7 | 6

=== Bottom half ===
First round
7 | (Spain) J Bouzas Maneiro | 6 | 6
Q | (United Kingdom) H Watson | 3 | 1
(Poland) M Fręch | 6 | 7^{8}
Q | (Uzbekistan) M Timofeeva | 4 | 6^{6}
(Colombia) E Arango | 7^{7} | 6
(Austria) A Potapova | 6^{0} | 2
8 | (Poland) M Linette | 7^{7} | 6
(Germany) T Maria | 6^{3} | 3
Q | (Andorra) V Jiménez Kasintseva | 6 | 1 | 6
(Kazakhstan) Y Putintseva | 4 | 6 | 4
Q | (United States) V Lepchenko | 2 | 1
Q | (China) S Zhang | 6 | 6

Second round
7 | (Spain) J Bouzas Maneiro | 0 | 3
(Poland) M Fręch | 6 | 6
(Colombia) E Arango | 6 | 1 | 0^{r}
4 | (Czech Republic) M Bouzková | 2 | 6 | 2
8 | (Poland) M Linette | 7 | 6^{5} | 5
Q | (Andorra) V Jiménez Kasintseva | 5 | 7^{7} | 7
Q | (China) S Zhang | 6 | 6
2 | (United States) E Navarro | 4 | 4

Quarterfinals
(Poland) M Fręch | 6 | 4 | 6
4 | (Czech Republic) M Bouzková | 3 | 6 | 3
Q | (Andorra) V Jiménez Kasintseva | 1 | 3
Q | (China) S Zhang | 6 | 6

Semifinals
(Poland) M Fręch | 6 | 6^{6} | 6
Q | (China) S Zhang | 2 | 7^{8} | 3

== Qualifying ==
=== Seeds ===
1. (China) Zhang Shuai (qualified)
2. (France) Diane Parry (first round)
3. (Andorra) Victoria Jiménez Kasintseva (qualified)
4. (Australia) Priscilla Hon (qualifying competition, lucky loser)
5. (United States) Varvara Lepchenko (qualified)
6. (Uzbekistan) Maria Timofeeva (qualified)
7. (Argentina) María Lourdes Carlé (qualifying competition)
8. (Armenia) Elina Avanesyan (qualifying competition)
9. (China) Guo Hanyu (withdrew, still playing in Midland)
10. (Mexico) Ana Sofía Sánchez (first round)
11. (Canada) Kayla Cross (first round)
12. (Canada) Cadence Brace (qualified)

=== Qualifiers ===
1. (China) Zhang Shuai
2. (United Kingdom) Heather Watson
3. (Andorra) Victoria Jiménez Kasintseva
4. (Canada) Cadence Brace
5. (United States) Varvara Lepchenko
6. (Uzbekistan) Maria Timofeeva

=== Lucky loser ===
1. (Australia) Priscilla Hon

=== Qualifying draw ===
==== First qualifier ====
First round
1 | (China) Zhang Shuai | 6 | 6
WC | (Poland) Katarzyna Piter | 3 | 4
WC | (Italy) Martina Trevisan | 6 | 6
10 | (Mexico) Ana Sofía Sánchez | 4 | 4

Qualifying competition
1 | (China) Zhang Shuai | 7 | 6
WC | (Italy) Martina Trevisan | 5 | 1

==== Second qualifier ====
First round
2 | (France) Diane Parry | 4 | 4
PR | (United Kingdom) Heather Watson | 6 | 6
(Bulgaria) Lia Karatancheva | 6 | 6
11 | (Canada) Kayla Cross | 2 | 4

Qualifying competition
PR | (United Kingdom) Heather Watson | 6 | 4 | 7
(Bulgaria) Lia Karatancheva | 3 | 6 | 5

==== Third qualifier ====
First round
3 | (Andorra) Victoria Jiménez Kasintseva | 6 | 6
(Serbia) Katarina Jokić | 2 | 4
(Italy) Miriana Tona | 6 | 6
Alt | (Ukraine) Valeriya Strakhova | 2 | 4

Qualifying competition
3 | (Andorra) Victoria Jiménez Kasintseva | 6 | 6
(Italy) Miriana Tona | 3 | 4

==== Fourth qualifier ====
First round
4 | (Australia) Priscilla Hon | 6 | 6
WC | (Mexico) Victoria Rodríguez | 4 | 3
PR | (United States) Sachia Vickery | 4 | 2
12 | (Canada) Cadence Brace | 6 | 6

Qualifying competition
4 | (Australia) Priscilla Hon | 4 | 4
12 | (Canada) Cadence Brace | 6 | 6

==== Fifth qualifier ====
First round
5 | (United States) Varvara Lepchenko | 6 | 6
(United States) Katrina Scott | 4 | 3
WC | (Mexico) Marian Gómez Pezuela Cano | 2 | 4
8 | (Armenia) Elina Avanesyan | 6 | 6

Qualifying competition
5 | (United States) Varvara Lepchenko | 6 | 2 | 6
8 | (Armenia) Elina Avanesyan | 4 | 6 | 3

==== Sixth qualifier ====
First round
6 | (Uzbekistan) Maria Timofeeva | 6 | 6
(Argentina) Martina Capurro Taborda | 4 | 1
(France) Tiphanie Lemaître | 6^{3} | 0^{r}
7 | (Argentina) María Lourdes Carlé | 7^{7} | 2

Qualifying competition
6 | (Uzbekistan) Maria Timofeeva | 6 | 6
7 | (Argentina) María Lourdes Carlé | 3 | 3
