= 2025 Qatar TotalEnergies Open – Singles =

Singles
- 2025 Qatar TotalEnergies Open

Final
- Champion: (United States) Amanda Anisimova
- Runner-up: (Latvia) Jeļena Ostapenko
- Score: 6–4, 6–3

Details
- Draw: 56
- Seeds: 16

Events
Singles	Doubles
← 2024 ·	WTA Qatar Open	· 2026 →

Amanda Anisimova defeated Jeļena Ostapenko in the final, 6–4, 6–3 to win the singles tennis title at the 2025 Qatar Open. It was her first WTA 1000 title, and third career title. Anisimova was the first unseeded champion since Elise Mertens in 2019, as well as the first American to win the title since Monica Seles in 2002. This was the first time since 2015 that the final was contested by two unseeded players.

Iga Świątek was the three-time defending champion, but lost in the semifinals to Ostapenko. Ostapenko improved her record against Świątek to 5–0.

== Seeds ==
The top eight seeds received a bye into the second round.

1. Aryna Sabalenka (second round)
2. (Poland) Iga Świątek (semifinals)
3. (United States) Coco Gauff (second round)
4. (Italy) Jasmine Paolini (third round)
5. (Kazakhstan) Elena Rybakina (quarterfinals)
6. (United States) Jessica Pegula (quarterfinals)
7. (China) Zheng Qinwen (second round)
8. (United States) Emma Navarro (second round)
9. (Spain) Paula Badosa (second round)
10. Daria Kasatkina (third round)
11. Diana Shnaider (first round)
12. Mirra Andreeva (second round)
13. (Brazil) Beatriz Haddad Maia (first round)
14. Anna Kalinskaya (first round)
15. (Croatia) Donna Vekić (first round)
16. Liudmila Samsonova (second round)

Click on the seed number of a player to go to their draw section.

== Draw ==
=== Key ===
- Q = Qualifier
- WC = Wild card
- LL = Lucky loser
- Alt = Alternate
- ITF = ITF entry
- PR = Protected ranking
- SR = Special ranking
- SE = Special exempt
- JE = Junior exempt
- JR = Junior Accelerator Programme entrant
- CO = College Accelerator Programme entrant
- NG = Next Gen Accelerator Program entrant
- w/o = Walkover
- r = Retired
- d = Defaulted

=== Finals ===
Quarterfinals
Ekaterina Alexandrova	4	6	6
6	(United States) Jessica Pegula	6	1	1
(Ukraine) Marta Kostyuk	6	5	4
(United States) Amanda Anisimova	4	7	6
(Tunisia) Ons Jabeur	2	2
(Latvia) Jeļena Ostapenko	6	6
5	(Kazakhstan) Elena Rybakina	2	5
2	(Poland) Iga Świątek	6	7

Semifinals
Ekaterina Alexandrova	3	3
(United States) Amanda Anisimova	6	6
(Latvia) Jeļena Ostapenko	6	6
2	(Poland) Iga Świątek	3	1

Final
(United States) Amanda Anisimova	6	6
(Latvia) Jeļena Ostapenko	4	3

=== Top half ===
==== Section 1 ====
First round
WC	(United Kingdom) E Raducanu	3	5
E Alexandrova	6	7
(Belgium) E Mertens	6	0
(Denmark) C Tauson	0	0^{r}
Q	(Spain) C Bucșa	6^{3}	7	6
14	A Kalinskaya	7^{7}	5	4
10	D Kasatkina	6	6
LL	P Kudermetova	0	0
(Armenia) E Avanesyan	7^{7}	1	7^{7}
(China) Xin Wang	6^{3}	6	6^{5}
(Czech Republic) M Vondroušová	6	2	5
(Ukraine) E Svitolina	0	6	7

Second round
1	A Sabalenka	6	3	6^{5}
E Alexandrova	3	6	7^{7}
(Belgium) E Mertens	6	6
Q	(Spain) C Bucșa	2	3
10	D Kasatkina	6	6
(Armenia) E Avanesyan	2	3
(Ukraine) E Svitolina	3	6^{3}
6	(United States) J Pegula	6	7^{7}

Third round
E Alexandrova	6	6
(Belgium) E Mertens	4	2
10	D Kasatkina	3	5
6	(United States) J Pegula	6	7

Quarterfinals
E Alexandrova	4	6	6
6	(United States) J Pegula	6	1	1

==== Section 2 ====
First round
(Ukraine) M Kostyuk	6	6
WC	(Turkey) Z Sönmez	3	3
Q	V Kudermetova	6	0	4
(Poland) M Linette	3	6	6
(Poland) M Fręch	6	3	6
13	(Brazil) B Haddad Maia	4	6	2
9	(Spain) P Badosa	6	4	6
LL	(Mexico) R Zarazúa	3	6	2
(United States) A Anisimova	6	7
V Azarenka	3	5
Q	(Belgium) G Minnen	1	2
(Canada) L Fernandez	6	6

Second round
3	(United States) C Gauff	2	5
(Ukraine) M Kostyuk	6	7
(Poland) M Linette	7	5	6
(Poland) M Fręch	5	7	4
9	(Spain) P Badosa	4	3
(United States) A Anisimova	6	6
(Canada) L Fernandez	6	6
8	(United States) E Navarro	2	2

Third round
(Ukraine) M Kostyuk	6	6
(Poland) M Linette	4	2
(United States) A Anisimova	6	6
(Canada) L Fernandez	3	0

Quarterfinals
(Ukraine) M Kostyuk	6	5	4
(United States) A Anisimova	4	7	6

=== Bottom half ===
==== Section 3 ====
First round
(United States) M Kessler	2	0
(Tunisia) O Jabeur	6	6
(United States) A Krueger	4	4
WC	(United States) S Kenin	6	6
Q	(United States) A Parks	6	7^{7}
11	D Shnaider	4	6^{2}
16	L Samsonova	6	6
(New Zealand) L Sun	3	3
Q	(Japan) A Ito	2	1
(Latvia) J Ostapenko	6	6
(China) Y Yuan	1	6^{5}
WC	(France) C Garcia	6	7^{7}

Second round
7	(China) Q Zheng	4	2
(Tunisia) O Jabeur	6	6
WC	(United States) S Kenin	7^{7}	3	6
Q	(United States) A Parks	6^{3}	6	2
16	L Samsonova	6^{5}	5
(Latvia) J Ostapenko	7^{7}	7
WC	(France) C Garcia	3	4
4	(Italy) J Paolini	6	6

Third round
(Tunisia) O Jabeur	6	6
WC	(United States) S Kenin	3	4
(Latvia) J Ostapenko	6	6
4	(Italy) J Paolini	2	2

Quarterfinals
(Tunisia) O Jabeur	2	2
(Latvia) J Ostapenko	6	6

==== Section 4 ====
First round
(Ukraine) D Yastremska	5	3
(United States) P Stearns	7	6
(Ukraine) A Kalinina	2	3
(Slovakia) R Šramková	6	6
Q	(United States) K Volynets	6	6^{4}	4
12	M Andreeva	4	7^{7}	6
15	(Croatia) D Vekić	2	4
(Czech Republic) L Nosková	6	6
(Kazakhstan) Y Putintseva	6	6^{5}	6
Q	(Japan) M Uchijima	2	7^{7}	3
(Greece) M Sakkari	4	6	4
Q	(Romania) E-G Ruse	6	3	0^{r}

Second round
5	(Kazakhstan) E Rybakina	6	6
(United States) P Stearns	2	4
(Slovakia) R Šramková	3	6	7
12	M Andreeva	6	3	5
(Czech Republic) L Nosková	6	6
(Kazakhstan) Y Putintseva	2	3
(Greece) M Sakkari	3	2
2	(Poland) I Świątek	6	6

Third round
5	(Kazakhstan) E Rybakina	7^{7}	6
(Slovakia) R Šramková	6^{1}	2
(Czech Republic) L Nosková	7^{7}	4	4
2	(Poland) I Świątek	6^{1}	6	6

Quarterfinals
5	(Kazakhstan) E Rybakina	2	5
2	(Poland) I Świątek	6	7

== Seeded players ==
The following are the seeded players. Seedings are based on WTA rankings as of 3 February 2025. Rankings and points before are as of 10 February 2025.

Under the 2025 Rulebook, points from one of the three non-combined WTA 1000 tournaments (which include Doha) are required to be counted in a player's ranking.

The points dropping column reflects (a) the points from the 2024 tournament or (b) the player's best 18th result. The points won column reflects (a) the points of the 2025 tournament, (b) the player's 18th best result or (c) the player's 19th best result.

Seed	Rank	Player	Points before	Points dropping	Points won	Points after	Status
1	1	Aryna Sabalenka	8,956	0	10	8,966	Second round lost to Ekaterina Alexandrova
2	2	(Poland) Iga Świątek	8,770	1,000	390	8,160	Semifinals lost to (Latvia) Jeļena Ostapenko
3	3	(United States) Coco Gauff	6,538	(108)^{†}	(108)^{‡}	6,538	Second round lost to (Ukraine) Marta Kostyuk
4	4	(Italy) Jasmine Paolini	5,288	10	120	5,398	Third round lost to (Latvia) Jeļena Ostapenko
5	7	(Kazakhstan) Elena Rybakina	4,588	650	215	4,153	Quarterfinals lost to (Poland) Iga Świątek [2]
6	5	(United States) Jessica Pegula	4,861	0	215	5,076	Quarterfinals lost to Ekaterina Alexandrova
7	8	(China) Zheng Qinwen	4,095	120	10	3,985	Second round lost to (Tunisia) Ons Jabeur
8	9	(United States) Emma Navarro	3,709	120	(60)^{§}	3,649	Second round lost to (Canada) Leylah Fernandez
9	10	(Spain) Paula Badosa	3,588	65	65	3,588	Second round lost to (United States) Amanda Anisimova
10	12	Daria Kasatkina	3,056	(60)^{†}	120	3,116	Third round lost to (United States) Jessica Pegula [6]
11	13	Diana Shnaider	2,873	30	10	2,853	First round lost to (United States) Alycia Parks [Q]
12	15	Mirra Andreeva	2,665	0	65	2,730	Second round lost to (Slovakia) Rebecca Šramková
13	16	(Brazil) Beatriz Haddad Maia	2,369	10	10	2,369	First round lost to (Poland) Magdalena Fręch
14	18	Anna Kalinskaya	2,304	10	10	2,304	First round lost to (Spain) Cristina Bucșa [Q]
15	19	(Croatia) Donna Vekić	2,273	10	10	2,273	First round lost to (Czech Republic) Linda Nosková
16	23	Liudmila Samsonova	1,945	10	65	2,000	Second round lost to (Latvia) Jeļena Ostapenko

† The player is defending points from her 18th best result.
‡ The player is keeping her 18th best result as it is higher than the Doha result, which does not need to be counted in her rankings.
§ The player is adding her 19th best result as it is higher than the Doha result, which does not need to be counted in her rankings.

=== Withdrawn seeded players ===
The following players would have been seeded, but withdrew before the tournament began.

Rank	Player	Points before	Points defending	Points after	Withdrawal reason
6	(United States) Madison Keys	4,680	0	4,680	Hamstring injury
11	(United States) Danielle Collins	3,122	245	2,877	Foot injury
14	(Czech Republic) Barbora Krejčíková	2,675	0	2,675	Back injury

== Other entry information ==
=== Wild cards ===
- (France) Caroline Garcia
- (United States) Sofia Kenin
- (United Kingdom) Emma Raducanu
- (Turkey) Zeynep Sönmez

=== Withdrawals ===
- (United Kingdom) Katie Boulter → replaced by (Czech Republic) Kateřina Siniaková
- (Czech Republic) Marie Bouzková → replaced by (Slovakia) Rebecca Šramková
- (United States) Danielle Collins → replaced by (United States) McCartney Kessler
- (United States) Madison Keys → replaced by (United States) Peyton Stearns
- (Czech Republic) Barbora Krejčiková → replaced by (China) Yuan Yue
- (Czech Republic) Karolína Muchová → replaced by (Ukraine) Anhelina Kalinina
- Anastasia Pavlyuchenkova → replaced by (United States) Ashlyn Krueger
- Anastasia Potapova → replaced by Polina Kudermetova (LL)
- (Czech Republic) Kateřina Siniaková → replaced by (Mexico) Renata Zarazúa (LL)

== Qualifying ==
=== Seeds ===
1. Veronika Kudermetova (qualified)
2. (China) Yuan Yue (moved to main draw)
3. Polina Kudermetova (qualifying competition, lucky loser)
4. (Japan) Moyuka Uchijima (qualified)
5. (Mexico) Renata Zarazúa (qualifying competition, lucky loser)
6. (United States) Katie Volynets (qualified)
7. Kamilla Rakhimova (first round)
8. (France) Varvara Gracheva (qualifying competition)
9. Erika Andreeva (qualifying competition)
10. (Germany) Laura Siegemund (qualifying competition)
11. (United States) Taylor Townsend (first round)
12. (Belgium) Greet Minnen (qualified)
13. (United States) Alycia Parks (qualified)
14. (United Kingdom) Sonay Kartal (qualifying competition)
15. (United States) Hailey Baptiste (first round, retired)
16. (Hungary) Anna Bondár (first round)

=== Qualifiers ===
1. Veronika Kudermetova
2. (Spain) Cristina Bucșa
3. (United States) Alycia Parks
4. (Japan) Moyuka Uchijima
5. (Belgium) Greet Minnen
6. (United States) Katie Volynets
7. (Romania) Elena-Gabriela Ruse
8. (Japan) Aoi Ito

=== Lucky losers ===
1. Polina Kudermetova
2. (Mexico) Renata Zarazúa

=== Draw ===
==== First qualifier ====
First round
1	Veronika Kudermetova	6	6
(Italy) Sara Errani	4	1
(Japan) Nao Hibino	1	0
9	Erika Andreeva	6	6

Qualifying competition
1	Veronika Kudermetova	6	6^{8}	6
9	Erika Andreeva	1	7^{10}	3

==== Second qualifier ====
First round
Alt	(Norway) Ulrikke Eikeri	1	0
(Spain) Cristina Bucșa	6	6
(Ukraine) Yuliia Starodubtseva	6	2	4
10	(Germany) Laura Siegemund	2	6	6

Qualifying competition
(Spain) Cristina Bucșa	6	7^{7}
10	(Germany) Laura Siegemund	2	6^{2}

==== Third qualifier ====
First round
3	Polina Kudermetova	6	6
WC	(China) Zheng Saisai	1	3
PR	(Belgium) Ysaline Bonaventure	1	0
13	(United States) Alycia Parks	6	6

Qualifying competition
3	Polina Kudermetova	3	2
13	(United States) Alycia Parks	6	6

==== Fourth qualifier ====
First round
4	(Japan) Moyuka Uchijima	6	2	6
Anastasia Zakharova	3	6	3
(France) Chloé Paquet	1	5
14	(United Kingdom) Sonay Kartal	6	7

Qualifying competition
4	(Japan) Moyuka Uchijima	6	6
14	(United Kingdom) Sonay Kartal	4	3

==== Fifth qualifier ====
First round
5	(Mexico) Renata Zarazúa	6	2
(Latvia) Darja Semeņistaja	2	1^{r}
(Germany) Jule Niemeier	3	1
12	(Belgium) Greet Minnen	6	6

Qualifying competition
5	(Mexico) Renata Zarazúa	1	6	1
12	(Belgium) Greet Minnen	6	3	6

==== Sixth qualifier ====
First round
6	(United States) Katie Volynets	6	6
WC	(Turkey) İpek Öz	2	1
(Switzerland) Rebeka Masarova	7	0
15	(United States) Hailey Baptiste	5	0^{r}

Qualifying competition
6	(United States) Katie Volynets	6	6^{6}	6
(Switzerland) Rebeka Masarova	1	7^{8}	1

==== Seventh qualifier ====
First round
7	Kamilla Rakhimova	1	3
(Australia) Daria Saville	6	6
(Romania) Elena-Gabriela Ruse	6	6^{4}	6
11	(United States) Taylor Townsend	3	7^{7}	2

Qualifying competition
(Australia) Daria Saville	3	4
(Romania) Elena-Gabriela Ruse	6	6

==== Eighth qualifier ====
First round
8	(France) Varvara Gracheva	6	6
(Slovakia) Anna Karolína Schmiedlová	4	1
(Japan) Aoi Ito	4	6	6
16	(Hungary) Anna Bondár	6	3	3

Qualifying competition
8	(France) Varvara Gracheva	2	4
(Japan) Aoi Ito	6	6
