= 2026 Mérida Open – Doubles =

Doubles
- 2026 Mérida Open

Final
- Champions: (Spain) Cristina Bucșa (China) Jiang Xinyu
- Runners-up: (Netherlands) Isabelle Haverlag (United Kingdom) Maia Lumsden
- Score: 6–4, 6–1

Details
- Draw: 16
- Seeds: 4

Events
Singles	Doubles
- Mérida Open

Cristina Bucșa and Jiang Xinyu defeated Isabelle Haverlag and Maia Lumsden in the final, 6–4, 6–1 to win the doubles tennis title at the 2026 Mérida Open. It was the eighth WTA Tour doubles title for Bucșa and seventh for Jiang. Bucșa was the first player to win the singles and doubles titles in the history of the event.

Katarzyna Piter and Mayar Sherif were the reigning champions, but Sherif did not participate this year. Piter partnered Janice Tjen, but lost in the semifinals to Bucșa and Jiang.

== Seeds ==
1. Irina Khromacheva / (United States) Nicole Melichar-Martinez (first round)
2. (Spain) Cristina Bucșa / (China) Jiang Xinyu (champions)
3. (China) Guo Hanyu / (France) Kristina Mladenovic (first round)
4. (Mexico) Giuliana Olmos / (Indonesia) Aldila Sutjiadi (first round)

== Draw ==
Key

- Q = Qualifier
- WC = Wild card
- LL = Lucky loser
- Alt = Alternate
- ITF = ITF entry
- PR = Protected ranking
- SR = Special ranking
- SE = Special exempt
- JE = Junior exempt
- JR = Junior Accelerator Programme entrant
- CO = College Accelerator Programme entrant
- NG = Next Gen Accelerator Program entrant
- w/o = Walkover
- r = Retired
- d = Defaulted

=== Draw ===
First round
1	I Khromacheva (United States) N Melichar-Martinez	6	4	[8]
(Czech Republic) A Dețiuc (United States) S Santamaria	1	6	[10]
(China) Q Tang (China) Y Xu	w/o
(Colombia) E Arango (Turkey) Z Sönmez
3	(China) H Guo (France) K Mladenovic	4	1
(United States) Q Gleason (Belgium) M Kempen	6	6
(Netherlands) I Haverlag (United Kingdom) M Lumsden	6	6
WC	(Mexico) M Gómez Pezuela Cano (Mexico) R Zarazúa	3	2
(Poland) K Piter (Indonesia) J Tjen	7^{10}	6
(United Kingdom) M Brooks (China) S Feng	6^{8}	3
(Czech Republic) M Bouzková (United States) A Li	6	6
4	(Mexico) G Olmos (Indonesia) A Sutjiadi	3	1
(India) R Bhosale (Japan) M Ninomiya	w/o
(Austria) A Potapova (Kazakhstan) Y Putintseva
Alt	(Andorra) V Jiménez Kasintseva (Ukraine) V Strakhova	1	6	[5]
2	(Spain) C Bucșa (China) X Jiang	6	4	[10]

Quarterfinals
(Czech Republic) A Dețiuc (United States) S Santamaria	4	0
(China) Q Tang (China) Y Xu	6	6
(United States) Q Gleason (Belgium) M Kempen	4	4
(Netherlands) I Haverlag (United Kingdom) M Lumsden	6	6
(Poland) K Piter (Indonesia) J Tjen	7^{7}	6
(Czech Republic) M Bouzková (United States) A Li	6^{3}	3
(India) R Bhosale (Japan) M Ninomiya	2	3
2	(Spain) C Bucșa (China) X Jiang	6	6

Semifinals
(China) Q Tang (China) Y Xu	5	5
(Netherlands) I Haverlag (United Kingdom) M Lumsden	7	7
(Poland) K Piter (Indonesia) J Tjen	5	2
2	(Spain) C Bucșa (China) X Jiang	7	6

Final
(Netherlands) I Haverlag (United Kingdom) M Lumsden	4	1
2	(Spain) C Bucșa (China) X Jiang	6	6
