= 2024 Mérida Open – Singles =

Singles
- 2024 Mérida Open

Final
- Champion: (Turkey) Zeynep Sönmez
- Runner-up: (United States) Ann Li
- Score: 6–2, 6–1

Details
- Draw: 32
- Seeds: 8

Events
Singles	Doubles
- Mérida Open

Zeynep Sönmez defeated Ann Li in the final, 6–2, 6–1 to win the singles title at the 2024 Mérida Open. It was her first WTA Tour title. Sönmez became the second Turkish woman to win a main tour singles title, and first since Çağla Büyükakçay in 2016.

Camila Giorgi was the reigning champion, but she retired from professional tennis in May 2024.

== Seeds ==
1. (Mexico) Renata Zarazúa (quarterfinals)
2. (Argentina) Nadia Podoroska (first round)
3. (Australia) Ajla Tomljanović (second round, withdrew)
4. (Germany) Jule Niemeier (first round)
5. Anna Blinkova (second round)
6. (Argentina) María Lourdes Carlé (first round)
7. (Germany) Tatjana Maria (first round)
8. (Spain) Nuria Párrizas Díaz (first round)

== Draw ==
Key

- Q = Qualifier
- WC = Wild card
- LL = Lucky loser
- Alt = Alternate
- ITF = ITF entry
- PR = Protected ranking
- SR = Special ranking
- SE = Special exempt
- JE = Junior exempt
- JR = Junior Accelerator Programme entrant
- CO = College Accelerator Programme entrant
- NG = Next Gen Accelerator Program entrant
- w/o = Walkover
- r = Retired
- d = Defaulted

=== Finals ===
Semifinals
(Turkey) Zeynep Sönmez	7^{7}	6
PR	Alina Korneeva	6^{5}	2
(United States) Ann Li	6	4	6
Polina Kudermetova	3	6	2

Final
(Turkey) Zeynep Sönmez	6	6
(United States) Ann Li	2	1

=== Top half ===
First round
1	(Mexico) R Zarazúa	7	6
WC	(United States) A Urhobo	5	2
Q	(Poland) M Chwalińska	4	6	6
(Canada) R Marino	6	4	3
(United States) R Montgomery	6	3	6^{4}
(France) E Jacquemot	4	6	7^{7}
(Turkey) Z Sönmez	5	6	6
6	(Argentina) ML Carlé	7	1	2
4	(Germany) J Niemeier	3	2
(Italy) L Stefanini	6	6
(Spain) S Sorribes Tormo	6	6
WC	(Mexico) AS Sánchez	2	1
(United States) A Parks	3	1
PR	A Korneeva	6	6
(Ukraine) L Tsurenko	6	4	0^{r}
5	A Blinkova	2	6	4

Second round
1	(Mexico) R Zarazúa	2	6	6
Q	(Poland) M Chwalińska	6	2	1
(France) E Jacquemot	6^{3}	3
(Turkey) Z Sönmez	7^{7}	6
(Italy) L Stefanini	4	6	4
(Spain) S Sorribes Tormo	6	1	6
PR	A Korneeva	7	6
5	A Blinkova	5	2

Quarterfinals
1	(Mexico) R Zarazúa	6	3	4
(Turkey) Z Sönmez	3	6	6
(Spain) S Sorribes Tormo	3	1
PR	A Korneeva	6	6

Semifinals
(Turkey) Z Sönmez	7^{7}	6
PR	A Korneeva	6^{5}	2

=== Bottom half ===
First round
8	(Spain) N Párrizas Díaz	0	4
(United States) A Li	6	6
(Croatia) A Ružić	6	6
WC	(Czech Republic) L Samson	4	4
(Switzerland) J Teichmann	6	6
Q	A Tikhonova	1	4
Q	(United States) E Mandlik	6^{9}	1
3	(Australia) A Tomljanović	7^{11}	6
7	(Germany) T Maria	4	4
PR	(Serbia) N Stojanović	6	6
(Australia) M Joint	6	6^{2}	6^{2}
(Canada) M Stakusic	2	7^{7}	7^{7}
Q	(Slovenia) T Zidanšek	2	2
(United States) V Lepchenko	6	6
P Kudermetova	6	6
2	(Argentina) N Podoroska	1	1

Second round
(United States) A Li	6	6
(Croatia) A Ružić	2	2
(Switzerland) J Teichmann	w/o
3	(Australia) A Tomljanović
PR	(Serbia) N Stojanović	6	6
(Canada) M Stakusic	3	3
(United States) V Lepchenko	3	4
P Kudermetova	6	6

Quarterfinals
(United States) A Li	6	6
(Switzerland) J Teichmann	1	1
PR	(Serbia) N Stojanović	7	4	3
P Kudermetova	5	6	6

Semifinals
(United States) A Li	6	4	6
P Kudermetova	3	6	2

== Qualifying ==
=== Seeds ===
1. (Poland) Maja Chwalińska (qualified)
2. (United States) Elizabeth Mandlik (qualified)
3. (Australia) Astra Sharma (qualifying competition)
4. (Romania) Miriam Bulgaru (qualifying competition)
5. Anastasia Tikhonova (qualified)
6. (Slovenia) Tamara Zidanšek (qualified)
7. (Ukraine) Anastasiia Sobolieva (first round, retired)
8. (United States) Sophie Chang (qualifying competition)

=== Qualifiers ===
1. (Poland) Maja Chwalińska
2. (United States) Elizabeth Mandlik
3. Anastasia Tikhonova
4. (Slovenia) Tamara Zidanšek

=== Qualifying draw ===
==== First qualifier ====
First round
1	(Poland) Maja Chwalińska	6	6
Maria Kononova	2	0
WC	(United States) Anna Frey	4	2
8	(United States) Sophie Chang	6	6

Qualifying competition
1	(Poland) Maja Chwalińska	6	6
8	(United States) Sophie Chang	0	2

==== Second qualifier ====
First round
2	(United States) Elizabeth Mandlik	6	6
(Mexico) Victoria Rodríguez	1	2
(Netherlands) Eva Vedder	3	6	2
7	(Ukraine) Anastasiia Sobolieva	6	3	2^{r}

Qualifying competition
2	(United States) Elizabeth Mandlik	6	6
(Netherlands) Eva Vedder	1	1

==== Third qualifier ====
First round
3	(Australia) Astra Sharma	6	6
(United States) Jessie Aney	0	1
Maria Kozyreva	3	6^{4}
5	Anastasia Tikhonova	6	7^{7}

Qualifying competition
3	(Australia) Astra Sharma	7^{9}	3	0
5	Anastasia Tikhonova	6^{7}	6	6

==== Fourth qualifier ====
First round
4	(Romania) Miriam Bulgaru	7	7
WC	(Mexico) Ana Karen Guadiana Campos	5	5
(United States) Victoria Hu	3	1
6	(Slovenia) Tamara Zidanšek	6	6

Qualifying competition
4	(Romania) Miriam Bulgaru	1	1
6	(Slovenia) Tamara Zidanšek	6	6
