= 2026 Mérida Open =

- Date: 23 February – 1 March
- Category: WTA 500
- Draw: 28S / 24Q / 16D
- Prize money: $1,206,446
- Surface: Hard (Outdoor)
- Location: Mérida, Yucatán, Mexico

Champions

Singles
- (Spain) Cristina Bucșa

Doubles
- (Spain) Cristina Bucșa / (China) Jiang Xinyu
- Mérida Open

The 2026 Mérida Open Akron was a WTA 500 tournament played on outdoor hardcourts as part of the 2026 WTA Tour. This was the fourth edition of the Mérida Open, and took place at the Yucatán Country Club in Mérida, Mexico, from 23 February to 1 March 2026.

== Champions ==
=== Singles ===
- (Spain) Cristina Bucșa def. (Poland) Magdalena Fręch, 6–1, 4–6, 6–4

=== Doubles ===
- (Spain) Cristina Bucșa / (China) Jiang Xinyu def. (Netherlands) Isabelle Haverlag / (United Kingdom) Maia Lumsden, 6–4, 6–1

== Points and prize money ==
=== Point distribution ===
Event	W	F	SF	QF	R16	R32	Q	Q2	Q1
Singles	500	325	195	108	60	1	25	13	1
Doubles	500	325	195	108	1	—N/a	—N/a	—N/a	—N/a

=== Prize money ===
Event	W	F	SF	QF	Round of 16	Round of 32	Q2	Q1
Singles	$185,500	$114,500	$66,003	$35,000	$18,045	$13,005	$10,500	$6,330
Doubles	$61,540	$37,400	$21,720	$11,150	$6,800	—N/a	—N/a	—N/a
Doubles prize money per team

== Singles main draw entrants ==
=== Seeds ===
Country	Player	Rank^{1}	Seed
ITA	Jasmine Paolini	8	1
USA	Emma Navarro	19	2
USA	Ann Li	36	3
CZE	Marie Bouzková	38	4
UKR	Dayana Yastremska	44	5
INA	Janice Tjen	46	6
ESP	Jéssica Bouzas Maneiro	48	7
POL	Magda Linette	50	8

- Rankings are as of 16 February 2026.

=== Other entrants ===
The following players received wildcards into the singles main draw:

- (United Kingdom) Katie Boulter
- (Italy) Jasmine Paolini
- (Canada) Marina Stakusic
- ~~(United States) Sloane Stephens~~

The following players received entry from the qualifying draw:

- (Canada) Cadence Brace
- (Andorra) Victoria Jiménez Kasintseva
- (United States) Varvara Lepchenko
- (Uzbekistan) Maria Timofeeva
- (United Kingdom) Heather Watson
- (China) Zhang Shuai

The following player received entry as a lucky loser:

- (Australia) Priscilla Hon

=== Withdrawals ===
- (Spain) Paula Badosa → replaced by (Kazakhstan) Yulia Putintseva
- (Italy) Elisabetta Cocciaretto → replaced by (Poland) Magdalena Fręch
- (Romania) Jaqueline Cristian → replaced by (Turkey) Zeynep Sönmez
- (Australia) Daria Kasatkina → replaced by (Indonesia) Janice Tjen
- (Greece) Maria Sakkari → replaced by (Croatia) Donna Vekić
- Liudmila Samsonova → replaced by (Colombia) Camila Osorio
- Diana Shnaider → replaced by (Mexico) Renata Zarazúa
- (United States) Sloane Stephens → replaced by (Australia) Priscilla Hon (LL)

== Doubles main draw entrants ==
=== Seeds ===
Country	Player	Country	Player	Rank^{†}	Seed
	Irina Khromacheva	USA	Nicole Melichar-Martinez	52	1
ESP	Cristina Bucșa	CHN	Jiang Xinyu	56	2
CHN	Guo Hanyu	FRA	Kristina Mladenovic	94	3
MEX	Giuliana Olmos	INA	Aldila Sutjiadi	97	4

- ^{1} Rankings as of 16 February 2026.

=== Other entrants ===
The following pairs received wildcards into the doubles main draw:

- (Mexico) Marian Gómez Pezuela Cano / (Mexico) Renata Zarazúa
- ~~(United States) Sloane Stephens / (Mexico) Ana Sofía Sánchez~~

The following pairs received entry as alternates:

- (Andorra) Victoria Jiménez Kasintseva / (Ukraine) Valeriya Strakhova

=== Withdrawals ===
- (Austria) Anastasia Potapova / (Kazakhstan) Yulia Putintseva → not replaced
- (United States) Sloane Stephens / (Mexico) Ana Sofía Sánchez → replaced by (Andorra) Victoria Jiménez Kasintseva / (Ukraine) Valeriya Strakhova (Alt)
