= Mérida Open =

WTA Tour
- Event name: Mérida Open
- Founded: 2023
- Editions: 4 (2026)
- Location: Mérida; Mexico
- Venue: Yucatan Country Club
- Category: WTA 250 (2023–2024); WTA 500 (2025–)
- Surface: Hard outdoor
- Draw: 28S / 24Q / 16D
- Prize money: US$1,206,446 (2026)
- Website: wtameridaopen.com

Current champions (2026)
- Singles: (Spain) Cristina Bucșa
- Doubles: (Spain) Cristina Bucșa (China) Jiang Xinyu

The Mérida Open (Spanish: Torneo de Mérida) is a WTA Tour tennis event in Mérida, Mexico. It is listed as a WTA 500 tournament as of 2025, and is held at the Yucatán Country Club on outdoor hardcourts.

The first edition took place in February 2023 and was introduced as a WTA 250 tournament as a replacement for Abierto Zapopan. In 2025, the tournament was upgraded to a WTA 500 status and moved to a new date in February to fill the vacancy generated by the cancellation of the San Diego Open.

== Past finals ==
=== Singles ===
| Year | Champion | Runner-up | Score |
|---|---|---|---|
| 2026 | (Spain) Cristina Bucșa | (Poland) Magdalena Fręch | 6–1, 4–6, 6–4 |
| 2025 | (United States) Emma Navarro | (Colombia) Emiliana Arango | 6–0, 6–0 |
↑ WTA 500 event ↑
| 2024 | (Turkey) Zeynep Sönmez | (United States) Ann Li | 6–2, 6–1 |
| 2023 | (Italy) Camila Giorgi | (Sweden) Rebecca Peterson | 7–6^{(7–3)}, 1–6, 6–2 |

=== Doubles ===
| Year | Champions | Runners-up | Score |
|---|---|---|---|
| 2026 | (Spain) Cristina Bucșa (China) Jiang Xinyu | (Netherlands) Isabelle Haverlag (United Kingdom) Maia Lumsden | 6–4, 6–1 |
| 2025 | (Poland) Katarzyna Piter (Egypt) Mayar Sherif | (Kazakhstan) Anna Danilina; Irina Khromacheva | 7–6^{(7–2)}, 7–5 |
↑ WTA 500 event ↑
| 2024 | (United States) Quinn Gleason (Brazil) Ingrid Martins | (Belgium) Magali Kempen (Belgium) Lara Salden | 6–4, 6–4 |
| 2023 | (United States) Caty McNally (France) Diane Parry | (China) Wang Xinyu (Chinese Taipei) Wu Fang-hsien | 6–0, 7–5 |

== See also ==
- Abierto Zapopan
- Guadalajara Open Akron
- Monterrey Open
- Abierto Mexicano Telcel
- Los Cabos Open
