= Magdalena Fręch =

Polish tennis player (born 1997)

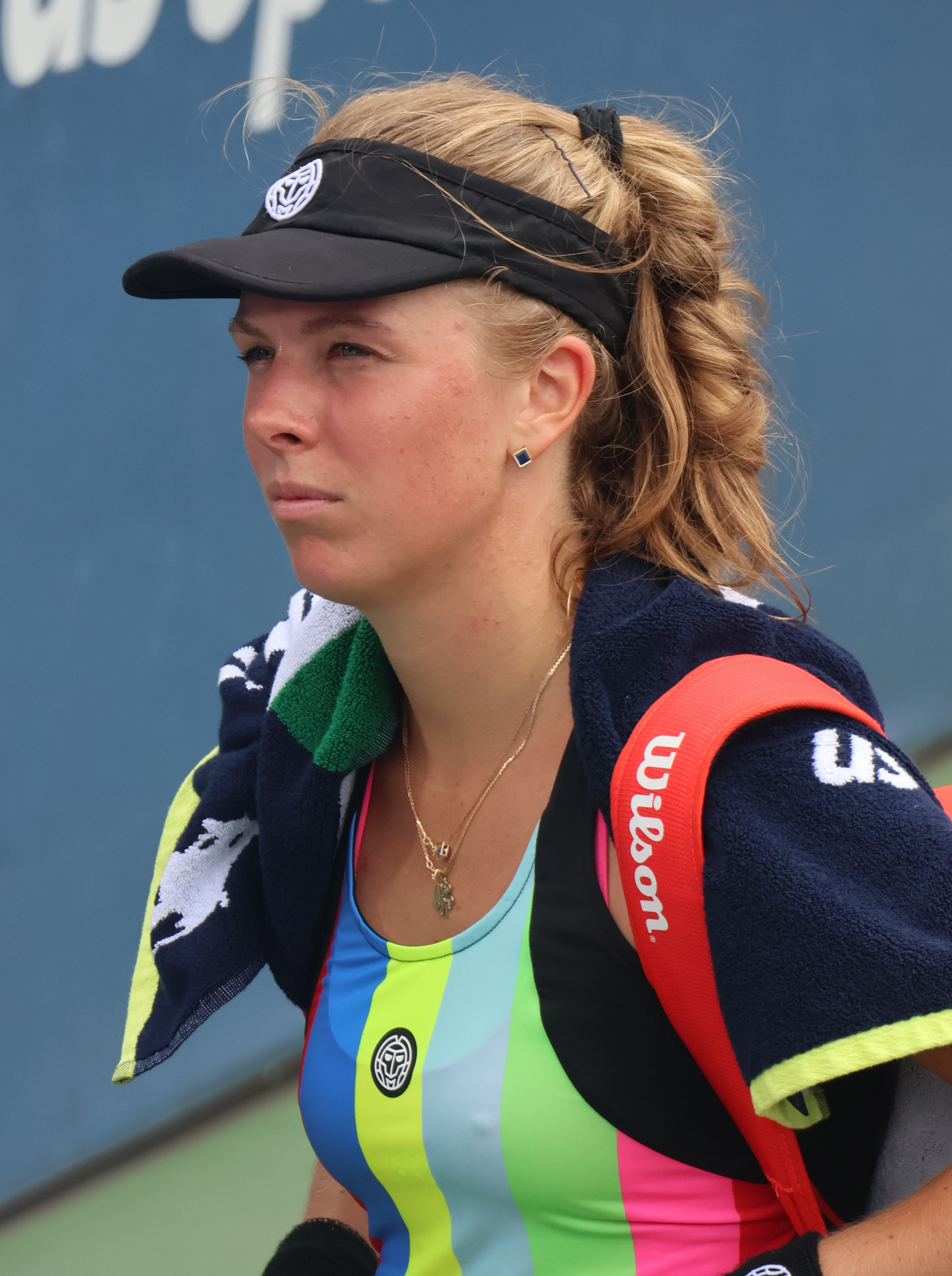
- Fręch at the 2023 US Open
- Country (sports): Poland
- Born: 15 December 1997 (age 28) Łódź, Poland
- Height: 1.71 m (5 ft 7 in)
- Turned pro: 2013
- Plays: Right (two-handed backhand)
- Coach: Andrzej Kobierski
- Prize money: US$ 5,219,954

Singles
- Career record: 447–333
- Career titles: 1
- Highest ranking: No. 22 (28 October 2024)
- Current ranking: No. 56 (12 October 2026)

Grand Slam singles results
- Australian Open: 4R (2024)
- French Open: 2R (2018, 2023, 2025, 2026)
- Wimbledon: 3R (2022)
- US Open: 3R (2025)

Other tournaments
- Olympic Games: 1R (2024)

Doubles
- Career record: 69–67
- Career titles: 4 ITF
- Highest ranking: No. 174 (8 August 2022)
- Current ranking: No. 234 (12 October 2026)

Grand Slam doubles results
- French Open: 1R (2024)
- Wimbledon: 3R (2022)
- US Open: 2R (2025)

Team competitions
- Fed Cup: 10–7
- Last updated on: 12 October 2026.

Magdalena Fręch (Polish pronunciation: [maɡdaˈlɛna ˈfrɛ̃x]; born 15 December 1997) is a Polish tennis player. She has a career-high singles ranking of world No. 22, achieved on 28 October 2024. On 8 August 2022, she peaked at No. 174 in the doubles rankings.

She has won one singles WTA Tour title and one on the WTA Challenger Tour, along with six singles and four doubles titles on the ITF Circuit.

Playing for Poland in the Billie Jean King Cup, Fręch has a win–loss record of 10–7, as of September 2024.

== Career ==
=== 2013-2018: WTA Tour and major debuts ===
Fręch made her WTA Tour debut at the Katowice Open in doubles, partnering with Katarzyna Pyka.

Fręch started 2018 season in Auckland where she lost in qualifying (in the first round) to Sachia Vickery, in straight sets. She then took part at the first Grand Slam tournament qualifying in her career - at the Australian Open. She beat Miyu Kato, Sofya Zhuk and Kayla Day, and became one of the twelve qualifiers, making her major main-draw debut. In the first round, she lost to eventual quarterfinalist Carla Suárez Navarro, in straight sets.

At the end of January, Fręch played at the 60k Andrézieux-Bouthéon event where she defeated Conny Perrin in three sets, Chloé Paquet in two and Vitalia Diatchenko y retirement. In the semifinals, she lost to eventual champion Georgina García Pérez, in three sets. In February, she started at the Hungarian Ladies Open where she came through the qualifying competition by defeating Çağla Büyükakçay in three, and Anna Blinkova in straight sets.

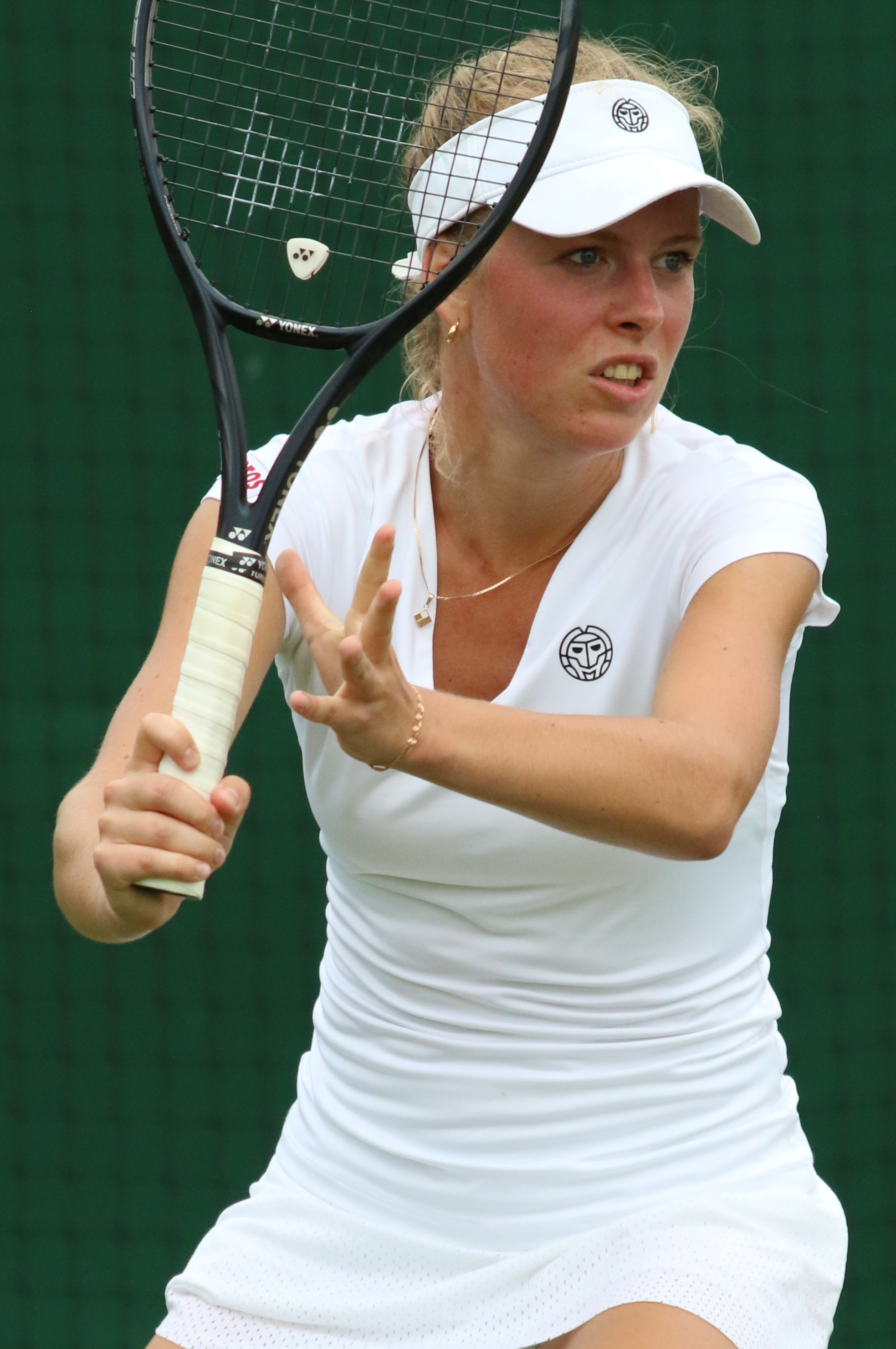
Fręch at the 2019 Wimbledon qualifying

=== 2021: First WTA 125 title ===
Fręch won her first WTA 125 title at the Concord Open, defeating Renata Zarazúa in the final. She qualified for the Indian Wells Open, registering a first-round win over Zheng Saisai, before losing to top seed Karolína Plíšková.

=== 2022: Wimbledon third round ===
At Indian Wells, entering into the main draw as a lucky loser, Fręch defeated Mayar Sherif in the first round then lost in to 30th seed Markéta Vondroušová.

At Wimbledon, she reached the third round of a Grand Slam tournament for the first time in her career at Wimbledon, with wins over 21st seed Camila Giorgi and Anna Karolína Schmiedlová, before losing to 16th seed Simona Halep.

=== 2023: WTA 1000 third round, top 75 ===
Fręch entered the Indian Wells Open as a lucky loser, and won her third match at this tournament defeating Maryna Zanevska, before losing to fourth seed Ons Jabeur.

At the Miami Open, she entered directly into the second round of the main draw, again as a lucky loser, after the late withdrawal of 26th seed Zhang Shuai. She defeated wildcard player Erika Andreeva to reach the third round at a WTA 1000-level event for the first time in her career, where she lost to Varvara Gracheva.

Fręch qualified for the China Open but lost in the first round to Katie Boulter. As a result, she reached a career-high year-end ranking of No. 63, on 6 November 2023.

=== 2024: Major fourth round, WTA 500 title, top 25 ===
Fręch reached the third round at the Australian Open defeating Daria Saville and 16th seed Caroline Garcia, her first top-20 career win. She defeated qualifier Anastasia Zakharova to reach the fourth round of a major for the first time in her career. As a result, she reached a new career-high WTA singles ranking, at world No. 51 on 29 January 2024.

At the WTA 1000 Dubai Championships, she reached the round of 16 as a qualifier, defeating 14th seed Ekaterina Alexandrova, her second top-20 win, and Petra Martić. She lost to fourth seed Elena Rybakina in three sets. As a result, she moved into the top 50 of the rankings on 26 February 2024.

In June, Fręch reached the quarterfinals at the Nottingham Open, before losing to eventual champion Katie Boulter. In July, at the Prague Open, she defeated third seed Anhelina Kalinina in the quarterfinals. She reached a historic first all-Polish WTA Tour final in the Open Era after 16 years old wildcard Laura Samson's retirement. She lost her first final to compatriot Magda Linette, in straight sets.

On her debut at the Cincinnati Open where she qualified for the main draw, she recorded her first win over Marie Bouzková before losing in the second round to Olympic champion, Zheng Qinwen. She followed this good showing by reaching the quarterfinals at the newly upgraded WTA 500 Monterrey Open where she lost to second seed Emma Navarro.

Seeded fifth at the Guadalajara Open, she reached her first WTA 500 final with wins over Emina Bektas, Ashlyn Krueger, wildcard player Marina Stakusic and fourth seed Caroline Garcia. Next, she defeated qualifier Olivia Gadecki, in straight sets, to lift her first WTA Tour title. As a result, she moved into a new career-high in the top 35 on 16 September 2024, becoming the Polish No. 2 women's player ahead of Magda Linette. She became the ninth first-time titlist on the WTA Tour. She also became the fourth Polish woman to win a tour-level title after Agnieszka Radwańska, Magda Linette and Iga Świątek. At the China Open where Fręch was seeded for the first time at a WTA 1000, she defeated qualifier Alycia Parks, in three sets and 12th seed Diana Shnaider to record her first two wins at the tournament and reached her first round of 16 at a WTA 1000 in her career.

In the second round of the Wuhan Open, Fręch beat sixth seed Emma Navarro in three sets, recording the first win over a top 10 player in her career, to reach back-to-back rounds of 16 at the 1000-level. Next, she reached her first WTA 1000 quarterfinal with an upset over ninth seed Beatriz Haddad Maia. As a result, she reached a new career-high in the top 25, on 14 October 2024.

=== 2025: Major third round, two tour quarterfinals ===
Seeded 23rd at the Australian Open, Fręch recorded wins over qualifier Polina Kudermetova and Anna Blinkova to reach the third round, where her run was ended by 14th seed Mirra Andreeva, in three sets.

Seeded fifth at the Washington Open, she defeated qualifier Yuliia Starodubtseva and wildcard entrant Venus Williams to make it through to the quarterfinals, at which point she lost to third seed Elena Rybakina. At the US Open, Fręch overcame wildcard entrant Talia Gibson and Peyton Stearns, before losing to third seed Coco Gauff in the third round.

Defending her title from 2024 at the Guadalajara Open, she received a bye due to being fourth seed and then defeated qualifier Lucrezia Stefanini to reach the quarterfinals, where she lost to wildcard entrant Nikola Bartůňková.

=== 2026: Mérida singles and Charleston doubles finals ===
At the Mérida Open, Fręch registered wins over qualifier Maria Timofeeva, seventh seed Jéssica Bouzas Maneiro, fourth seed Marie Bouzková and qualifier Zhang Shuai to reach the final, which she lost to Cristina Bucșa in three sets.

Teaming up with Anna Bondár, she made it into her first tour doubles final at the Charleston Open, losing to Desirae Krawczyk and Caty McNally in straight sets.

== National representation ==
In 2016, Fręch made her debut in the Fed Cup, playing for Poland. Her first match was in a World Group II play-off where Poland played against the team of Chinese Taipei. Frech was chosen to play her first match against Lee Ya-hsuan, in which she also made her first Fed Cup win. In the next match, Frech lost against Hsu Ching-wen.

In 2018, from 7 to 10 February, she played Fed Cup in Tallinn where she lost to Melanie Klaffner (Austria) in straight sets, Anastasija Sevastova (Latvia) in straight sets, and she defeated Ayla Aksu (Turkey) and Isabella Shinikova (Bulgaria) - both in straight sets.

== Performance timelines ==
Key
W	F	SF	QF	#R	RR	Q#	P#	DNQ	A	Z#	PO	G	S	B	NMS	NTI	P	NH

(W) winner; (F) finalist; (SF) semifinalist; (QF) quarterfinalist; (#R) rounds 4, 3, 2, 1; (RR) round-robin stage; (Q#) qualification round; (P#) preliminary round; (DNQ) did not qualify; (A) absent; (Z#) Davis/Fed Cup Zonal Group (with number indication) or (PO) play-off; (G) gold, (S) silver or (B) bronze Olympic/Paralympic medal; (NMS) not a Masters tournament; (NTI) not a Tier I tournament; (P) postponed; (NH) not held; (SR) strike rate (events won / competed); (W–L) win–loss record.
To avoid confusion and double counting, these charts are updated at the conclusion of a tournament or when the player's participation has ended.

Only main-draw results in WTA Tour, Grand Slam tournaments, Billie Jean King Cup, United Cup, Hopman Cup and Olympic Games are included in win–loss records.

=== Singles ===
Current through the 2026 China Open.

Tournament	2014	2015	2016	2017	2018	2019	2020	2021	2022	2023	2024	2025	2026	SR	W–L	Win%
Grand Slam tournaments
Australian Open	A	A	A	A	1R	Q1	Q1	A	1R	Q2	4R	3R	2R	0 / 5	6–5	55%
French Open	A	A	A	A	2R	Q1	Q1	Q3	1R	2R	1R	2R	2R	0 / 6	4–6	40%
Wimbledon	A	A	A	A	Q1	Q1	NH	Q2	3R	1R	1R	1R	1R	0 / 5	2–5	29%
US Open	A	A	A	A	Q1	1R	A	Q1	1R	2R	1R	3R	1R	0 / 6	3–6	33%
Win–loss	0–0	0–0	0–0	0–0	1–2	0–1	0–0	0–0	2–4	2–3	3–4	5–4	2–4	0 / 22	15–22	41%
National representation
Summer Olympics	Not held		A	Not held				A	Not held		1R	Not held		0 / 1	0–1	0%
Billie Jean King Cup (Note: Formerly known as Fed Cup until 2020.)	A	A	WG2	Z1	Z1	Z1	PO (Note: Edition is split into the two years due to COVID-19.)		RR	RR	SF	A		0 / 3	7–7	50%
WTA 1000 tournaments
Qatar Open	A	NTI	A	NTI	A	NTI	Q2	NTI	A	NTI	1R	2R	2R	0 / 3	2–3	40%
Dubai Championships	NTI	A	NTI	A	NTI	1R	NTI	Q1	NTI	Q1	3R	1R	1R	0 / 4	2–4	33%
Indian Wells Open	A	A	A	A	A	A	NH	2R	2R	2R	1R	2R	1R	0 / 6	3–6	33%
Miami Open	A	A	A	A	A	A	NH	A	1R	3R	1R	2R	1R	0 / 5	1–5	17%
Madrid Open	A	A	A	A	A	A	NH	A	Q1	2R	1R	3R	2R	0 / 4	3–4	43%
Italian Open	A	A	A	A	A	A	A	A	A	2R	2R	3R	1R	0 / 4	3–4	43%
Canadian Open	A	A	A	A	Q1	A	NH	A	A	1R	2R	2R	2R	0 / 4	2–4	33%
Cincinnati Open	A	A	A	A	A	A	A	A	Q2	Q1	2R	2R	3R	0 / 3	3–3	50%
China Open	A	A	A	A	A	A	Not held			1R	4R	1R	2R	0 / 4	3–4	43%
Wuhan Open	A	A	A	A	A	A	Not held				QF	3R		0 / 2	5–2	71%
Guadalajara Open	Not held								2R	2R	Not Tier I			0 / 2	2–2	50%
Win–loss	0–0	0–0	0–0	0–0	0–0	0–1	0–0	1–1	2–3	6–7	12–10	4–10	5–9	0 / 41	30–41	42%
Career statistics
	2014	2015	2016	2017	2018	2019	2020	2021	2022	2023	2024	2025	2026	SR	W–L	Win%
Tournaments	1	1	0 (Note: During the season, she did not play in the main-draw of any WTA Tour-level tournaments. However, she played at the Billie Jean King Cup, which is not counted as a played tournament but matches count.)	1	10	6	2	8	19	18	27	25	15	Career total: 133		
Hard win–loss	0–1	0–1	1–1	0–0	2–8	1–3	0–1	4–4	5–12	5–12	14–12	10–16	12–12	0 / 83	54–83	39%
Clay win–loss	0–0	0–0	0–0	0–1	2–3	0–2	2–1	2–3	2–5	3–3	6–8	4–5	0–3	0 / 34	21–34	38%
Grass win–loss	0–0	0–0	0–0	0–0	1–1	0–1	NH	0–1	4–4	4–3	2–4	1–4	0–0	0 / 18	12–18	40%
Overall win–loss	0–1	0–1	1–1	0–1	5–12	1–6	2–2	6–8	11–21	12–18	22–24	15–25	8–11	0 / 135	87–135	39%
Year-end ranking (Note: 2013: WTA ranking - 1008.)	493	459	321	166	151	198	156	102	116	63	25	59		$5,219,954		

=== Doubles ===
Tournament	2014	2015	2016	2017	2018	2019	2020	2021	2022	2023	2024	2025	2026	SR	W–L
Grand Slam tournaments
Australian Open	A	A	A	A	A	A	A	A	A	A	A	A	A	0 / 0	0–0
French Open	A	A	A	A	A	A	A	A	A	A	1R	A	A	0 / 1	0–1
Wimbledon	A	A	A	A	A	A	NH	A	3R	A	1R	A	1R	0 / 3	2–3
US Open	A	A	A	A	A	A	A	A	A	A	A	2R	A	0 / 1	1–1
Win–loss	0–0	0–0	0–0	0–0	0–0	0–0	0–0	0–0	2–1	0–0	0–2	1–1	0–1	0 / 5	3–5
National representation
Billie Jean King Cup	A	A	WG2	Z1	Z1	Z1	PO		RR					0 / 1	3–0
Career statistics
Tournaments	1	1	0	0	2	0	0	4	2	0	2	1	1	Career total: 14	
Overall win–loss	0–1	1–1	0–0	0–0	1–2	0–0	0–0	1–4	1–2	0–0	0–2	1–1	0–1	0 / 14	5–14
Year-end ranking	642	418	542	251	425	870	262	227	525	388	613	540			

== WTA Tour finals ==
=== Singles: 3 (1 title, 2 runner-ups) ===
Legend WTA 500 (1–1) WTA 250 (0–1)	Finals by surface Hard (1–1) Clay (0–1)	Finals by setting Outdoor (1–2)

Result	W–L	Date	Tournament	Tier	Surface	Opponent	Score
Loss	0–1	Jul 2024	Prague Open, Czech Republic	WTA 250	Clay	(Poland) Magda Linette	2–6, 1–6
Win	1–1	Sep 2024	Guadalajara Open, Mexico	WTA 500	Hard	(Australia) Olivia Gadecki	7–6^{(7–5)}, 6–4
Loss	1–2	Mar 2026	Mérida Open, Mexico	WTA 500	Hard	(Spain) Cristina Bucșa	1–6, 6–4, 4–6

=== Doubles: 1 (runner-up) ===
Legend WTA 500 (0–1)	Finals by surface Clay (0–1)	Finals by setting Outdoor (0–1)

Result	Date	Tournament	Tier	Surface	Partner	Opponents	Score
Loss	Mar 2026	Charleston Open, US	WTA 500	Clay (green)	(Hungary) Anna Bondár	(United States) Desirae Krawczyk (United States) Caty McNally	3–6, 2–6

== WTA 125 finals ==
=== Singles: 1 (title) ===
Result	Date	Tournament	Surface	Opponent	Score
Win	Aug 2021	Concord Tennis Open, United States	Hard	(Mexico) Renata Zarazúa	6–3, 7–6^{(7–4)}

== ITF Circuit finals ==
=== Singles: 9 (6 titles, 3 runner-ups) ===
Legend W100 tournaments (1–1) W60 tournaments (1–0) W25 tournaments (3–2) W15 tournaments (1–0)	Finals by surface Hard (3–1) Clay (3–0) Carpet (0–2)

Result	W–L	Date	Tournament	Tier	Surface	Opponent	Score
Win	1–0	Mar 2016	ITF Nishitama, Japan	10k	Hard	(Japan) Mai Minokoshi	7–5, 6–4
Win	2–0	Aug 2017	ITF Leipzig, Germany	25k	Clay	(Netherlands) Richèl Hogenkamp	6–2, 7–6^{(7–3)}
Win	3–0	Aug 2017	ITF Braunschweig, Germany	25k	Clay	(Spain) Olga Sáez Larra	6–2, 2–6, 7–6^{(7–3)}
Loss	3–1	Oct 2017	ITF Óbidos, Portugal	25k	Carpet	(Russia) Irina Khromacheva	1–6, 6–4, 4–6
Loss	3–2	Oct 2017	ITF Óbidos, Portugal	25k	Carpet	(Russia) Anna Kalinskaya	3–6, 3–6
Win	4–2	Jan 2020	Canberra International, Australia (Note: Tournament moved from Canberra to Bendigo due to the smoke affecting Canberra from the 2019–20 Australian bushfire season.)	W25	Hard	(Romania) Patricia Maria Țig	w/o
Win	5–2	Sep 2021	Prague Open, Czech Republic	W60	Clay	(Czech Republic) Tereza Smitková	6–2, 6–1
Loss	5–3	Dec 2022	Dubai Tennis Challenge, UAE	W100	Hard	(France) Elsa Jacquemot	5–7, 2–6
Win	6–3	Oct 2023	ITF Els Gorchs, Spain	W100	Hard	(Italy) Sara Errani	7–5, 4–6, 6–4

=== Doubles: 8 (4 titles, 4 runner-ups) ===
Legend W100 tournaments (2–1) W80 tournaments (1–0) W60 tournaments (0–2) W25 tournaments (1–1)	Finals by surface Hard (2–2) Clay (1–2) Grass (1–0)

Result	W–L	Date	Tournament	Tier	Surface	Partner	Opponents	Score
Loss	0–1	Jun 2015	Bella Cup Toruń, Poland	25k	Clay	(Philippines) Katharina Lehnert	(Georgia (country)) Ekaterine Gorgodze (Georgia (country)) Sofia Shapatava	4–6, 4–6
Loss	0–2	Mar 2017	Open de Seine-et-Marne, France	60k	Hard (i)	(France) Manon Arcangioli	(Belarus) Vera Lapko (Russia) Polina Monova	3–6, 4–6
Win	1–2	Jun 2017	Manchester Trophy, UK	100k	Grass	(Belgium) An-Sophie Mestach	(Chinese Taipei) Chang Kai-chen (New Zealand) Marina Erakovic	6–4, 7–6^{(5)}
Win	2–2	Oct 2018	Open de Touraine, France	25k	Hard (i)	(Netherlands) Bibiane Schoofs	(Czech Republic) Miriam Kolodziejová (Czech Republic) Jesika Malečková	5–7, 6–2, [10–3]
Loss	2–3	Sep 2020	Open de Saint-Malo, France	W60	Clay	(Switzerland) Viktorija Golubic	(Poland) Paula Kania (Poland) Katarzyna Piter	2–6, 4–6
Win	3–3	Oct 2020	Tennis Classic of Macon, US	W80	Hard	(Poland) Katarzyna Kawa	(United States) Francesca Di Lorenzo (United States) Jamie Loeb	7–5, 6–1
Win	4–3	Nov 2020	ITF Charleston Pro, US	W100	Clay	(Poland) Katarzyna Kawa	(Australia) Astra Sharma (Egypt) Mayar Sherif	4–6, 6–4, [10–2]
Loss	4–4	Dec 2022	Dubai Tennis Challenge, UAE	W100+H	Hard	(Ukraine) Kateryna Volodko	(Hungary) Tímea Babos (France) Kristina Mladenovic	1–6, 3–6

== Wins against top-10 players ==
No.	Player	Rk	Event	Surface	Rd	Score	Rk	Years	Ref
1	(United States) Emma Navarro	8	Wuhan Open, China	Hard	2R	6–4, 3–6, 6–3	27	2024	
2	Mirra Andreeva	7	Berlin Open, Germany	Grass	1R	2–6, 7–5, 6–0	25	2025	

- Key: (Rk) first use, opponent rank; (Rd) round; (Rk) 2nd use, player rank; (Ref) reference; (F) final; (SF) semifinal; (QF) quarterfinal; (#R) rounds 4, 3, 2, 1; (RR) round-robin stage; (Q#) qualifying rounds or stages (3), 2, 1.
