= 2022 Thoreau Tennis Open =

- Date: 8–14 August 2022
- Edition: 3rd
- Category: WTA 125
- Prize money: $115,000
- Surface: Hard
- Location: Concord, United States
- Venue: The Thoreau Club

Champions

Singles
- (United States) CoCo Vandeweghe

Doubles
- Varvara Flink / (United States) CoCo Vandeweghe
← 2021 ·	Thoreau Tennis Open	· 2023 →

The 2022 Thoreau Tennis Open was a professional tennis tournament played on outdoor hard courts. It was the third edition of the tournament which was part of the 2022 WTA 125 tournaments. It took place at The Thoreau Club in Concord, Massachusetts between 8 and 14 August 2022.

== Singles main-draw entrants ==
=== Seeds ===
Country	Player	Rank^{1}	Seed
DEN	Clara Tauson	49	1
USA	Bernarda Pera	58	2
	Varvara Gracheva	63	3
POL	Magdalena Fręch	82	4
SUI	Viktorija Golubic	92	5
~~CHN~~	~~Wang Xiyu~~	~~95~~	~~6~~
BEL	Greet Minnen	99	7
	Kamilla Rakhimova	107	8

- ^{1} Rankings are as of 1 August 2022.

=== Other entrants ===
The following players received wildcards into the singles main draw:

- (United States) Ashlyn Krueger
- (Switzerland) Lulu Sun
- (Denmark) Clara Tauson
- (United States) Taylor Townsend
- (United States) Coco Vandeweghe

The following player received entry into the singles main draw through protected ranking:

- Varvara Flink

The following players received entry from the qualifying draw:

- (United States) Kayla Day
- (Germany) Eva Lys
- (United States) Katrina Scott
- (Ukraine) Kateryna Volodko

The following player received entry as a lucky loser:

- (Japan) Moyuka Uchijima

=== Withdrawals ===
Before the tournament

- Vitalia Diatchenko → replaced by (United States) Caty McNally
- (Georgia (country)) Ekaterine Gorgodze → replaced by Varvara Flink
- Anna Kalinskaya → replaced by (Mexico) Renata Zarazúa
- (Germany) Tamara Korpatsch → replaced by (Georgia (country)) Mariam Bolkvadze
- (United States) Ann Li → replaced by (Australia) Astra Sharma
- (Ukraine) Daria Snigur → replaced by (China) Wang Qiang
- (China) Wang Xiyu → replaced by (Japan) Moyuka Uchijima

== Retirement ==
- (Czech Republic) Karolína Muchová (wrist injury)

== Doubles main-draw entrants ==
=== Seeds ===
Country	Player	Country	Player	Rank^{†}	Seed
GEO	Natela Dzalamidze		Kamilla Rakhimova	132	1
	Amina Anshba		Yana Sizikova	184	2
	Anna Blinkova	BEL	Greet Minnen	184	3
AUS	Astra Sharma	INA	Aldila Sutjiadi	190	4

† Rankings are as of 1 August 2022

=== Withdrawals ===
Before the tournament

- (United States) Sophie Chang / (United States) Angela Kulikov → replaced by Lidziya Marozava / (Ukraine) Kateryna Volodko
- Anna Kalinskaya / (United States) Caty McNally → replaced by (United States) Alycia Parks / (Mexico) Renata Zarazúa
- (Thailand) Peangtarn Plipuech / (Indonesia) Jessy Rompies → replaced by (Thailand) Peangtarn Plipuech / (Japan) Moyuka Uchijima

== Champions ==
=== Singles ===
- (United States) CoCo Vandeweghe def. (United States) Bernarda Pera 6–3, 5–7, 6–4

=== Doubles ===
- Varvara Flink / (United States) CoCo Vandeweghe def. (Thailand) Peangtarn Plipuech / (Japan) Moyuka Uchijima 6–3, 7–6^{(7–3)}
