= 2021 Thoreau Tennis Open – Doubles =

Doubles
- 2021 Thoreau Tennis Open

Final
- Champions: (Thailand) Peangtarn Plipuech (Indonesia) Jessy Rompies
- Runners-up: (United States) Usue Maitane Arconada (Spain) Cristina Bucșa
- Score: 3–6, 7–6^{(7–5)}, [10–8]

Events
Singles	Doubles
← 2019 ·	Thoreau Tennis Open	· 2022 →

Angela Kulikov and Rianna Valdes were the defending champions, having won the previous edition in 2019 but lost in the quarterfinals to Usue Maitane Arconada and Cristina Bucșa.

Peangtarn Plipuech and Jessy Rompies won the title, defeating Arconada and Bucșa in the final, 3–6, 7–6^{(7–5)}, [10–8].

== Seeds ==
1. (Chinese Taipei) Hsieh Su-wei / (Chinese Taipei) Hsieh Yu-chieh (quarterfinals)
2. (India) Ankita Raina / (United Kingdom) Eden Silva (Silva withdrew due to illness; Raina re-paired with Mona Barthel)
3. (Ukraine) Kateryna Bondarenko / (Germany) Tatjana Maria (quarterfinals)
4. (United States) Quinn Gleason / (United States) Jamie Loeb (first round)

== Draw ==
=== Key ===
- Q = Qualifier
- WC = Wild card
- LL = Lucky loser
- Alt = Alternate
- SE = Special exempt
- PR = Protected ranking
- ITF = ITF entry
- JE = Junior exempt
- w/o = Walkover
- r = Retired
- d = Defaulted
- SR = Special ranking

=== Draw ===
First round
1	(Chinese Taipei) S-w Hsieh (Chinese Taipei) Y-c Hsieh	6	6
(United States) L Davis (United States) C McHale	3	2
(Kazakhstan) G Voskoboeva (Russia) V Zvonareva	6	6
(Switzerland) L Küng (Mexico) R Zarazúa	1	1
3	(Ukraine) K Bondarenko (Germany) T Maria	6	6
(Chinese Taipei) C-y Hsu (Canada) R Marino	3	3
(Thailand) P Plipuech (Indonesia) J Rompies	6	6
WC	(United States) B Collens (United States) V Hu	1	0
(United States) A Kulikov (United States) R Valdes	6	4	[14]
(United States) C Harrison (United Kingdom) S Murray Sharan	2	6	[12]
(United States) UM Arconada (Spain) C Bucșa	6	7^{7}
4	(United States) Q Gleason (United States) J Loeb	3	6^{5}
(United States) S Chang (United States) S Whittle	4	6	[10]
(United States) R Anderson (Indonesia) B Gumulya	6	3	[8]
(Australia) L Cabrera (Australia) M Inglis	6	4	[3]
Alt	(Germany) M Barthel (India) A Raina	3	6	[10]

Quarterfinals
1	(Chinese Taipei) S-w Hsieh (Chinese Taipei) Y-c Hsieh	6^{4}	4
(Kazakhstan) G Voskoboeva (Russia) V Zvonareva	7^{7}	6
3	(Ukraine) K Bondarenko (Germany) T Maria	5	3
(Thailand) P Plipuech (Indonesia) J Rompies	7	6
(United States) A Kulikov (United States) R Valdes	4	0
(United States) UM Arconada (Spain) C Bucșa	6	6
(United States) S Chang (United States) S Whittle	5	2
Alt	(Germany) M Barthel (India) A Raina	7	6

Semifinals
(Kazakhstan) G Voskoboeva (Russia) V Zvonareva	6	1	[9]
(Thailand) P Plipuech (Indonesia) J Rompies	4	6	[11]
(United States) UM Arconada (Spain) C Bucșa	4	6	[10]
Alt	(Germany) M Barthel (India) A Raina	6	4	[8]

Final
(Thailand) P Plipuech (Indonesia) J Rompies	3	7^{7}	[10]
(United States) UM Arconada (Spain) C Bucșa	6	6^{5}	[8]
