= 2021 Thoreau Tennis Open – Singles =

Singles
- 2021 Thoreau Tennis Open

Final
- Champion: (Poland) Magdalena Fręch
- Runner-up: (Mexico) Renata Zarazúa
- Score: 6–3, 7–6^{(7–4)}

Events
| Singles | Doubles |
| ← 2019 · | Thoreau Tennis Open | · 2022 → |

Caroline Dolehide was the defending champion, having won the previous edition in 2019. She lost in the second round to Katrina Scott.

Magdalena Fręch won the title, defeating Renata Zarazúa in the final, 6–3, 7–6^{(7–4)}.

== Seeds ==
1. (Belgium) Alison Van Uytvanck (withdrew)
2. (Chinese Taipei) Hsieh Su-wei (quarterfinals)
3. (United States) Madison Brengle (semifinals)
4. (Russia) Vera Zvonareva (semifinals)
5. (United States) Lauren Davis (first round)
6. (United States) Christina McHale (first round)
7. (Belgium) Greet Minnen (second round)
8. (Mexico) Renata Zarazúa (final)
9. (Australia) Storm Sanders (second round)

== Draw ==
=== Key ===
- Q = Qualifier
- WC = Wild card
- LL = Lucky loser
- Alt = Alternate
- SE = Special exempt
- PR = Protected ranking
- ITF = ITF entry
- JE = Junior exempt
- w/o = Walkover
- r = Retired
- d = Defaulted
- SR = Special ranking

=== Finals ===
Semifinals
(Poland) Magdalena Fręch | 7 | 6
4 | (Russia) Vera Zvonareva | 5 | 3
3 | (United States) Madison Brengle | 6 | 4 | 2
8 | (Mexico) Renata Zarazúa | 2 | 6 | 6

Final
(Poland) Magdalena Fręch | 6 | 7^{7}
8 | (Mexico) Renata Zarazúa | 3 | 6^{4}

=== Top half ===
First round
9 | (Australia) S Sanders | 6 | 6
WC | (United States) A Parks | 2 | 4
PR | (Canada) R Marino | 3 | 6^{4}
(Poland) M Fręch | 6 | 7^{7}
(United States) C Dolehide | 6 | 6
Q | (United States) R Anderson | 3 | 4
WC | (United States) K Scott | 7^{7} | 7
5 | (United States) L Davis | 6^{1} | 5
4 | (Russia) V Zvonareva | 6 | 6
Q | (Chinese Taipei) E-s Liang | 1 | 2
(Germany) T Maria | 0 | 3
(United States) V Lepchenko | 6 | 6
Q | (Georgia (country)) M Bolkvadze | 6 | 3 | 6
Q | (United States) V Duval | 2 | 6 | 1
(Switzerland) L Küng | 4 | 1
7 | (Belgium) G Minnen | 6 | 6

Second round
9 | (Australia) S Sanders | 3 | 2
(Poland) M Fręch | 6 | 6
(United States) C Dolehide | 6 | 0 | 5
WC | (United States) K Scott | 1 | 6 | 7
4 | (Russia) V Zvonareva | 6 | 6
(United States) V Lepchenko | 3 | 4
Q | (Georgia (country)) M Bolkvadze | 6 | 6
7 | (Belgium) G Minnen | 4 | 4

Quarterfinals
(Poland) M Fręch | 6 | 4 | 7
WC | (United States) K Scott | 4 | 6 | 5
4 | (Russia) V Zvonareva | 5 | 6 | 6
Q | (Georgia (country)) M Bolkvadze | 7 | 2 | 4

Semifinals
(Poland) M Fręch | 7 | 6
4 | (Russia) V Zvonareva | 5 | 3

=== Bottom half ===
First round
6 | (United States) C McHale | 4 | 3
(Spain) C Bucșa | 6 | 6
(United States) UM Arconada | 7^{13} | 2 | 6
(United States) J Loeb | 6^{11} | 6 | 4
WC | (Switzerland) L Sun | 6 | 6
(Japan) K Nara | 1 | 3
(Australia) M Inglis | 3 | 0^{r}
3 | (United States) M Brengle | 6 | 3
8 | (Mexico) R Zarazúa | 6^{5} | 6 | 6
LL | (United States) A Glatch | 7^{7} | 2 | 3
WC | (United States) S Whittle | 6^{3} | 1
(United States) G Min | 7^{7} | 6
(Australia) L Cabrera | 4 | 6 | 4
(Brazil) B Haddad Maia | 6 | 3 | 6
(India) A Raina | 2 | 2
2 | (Chinese Taipei) S-w Hsieh | 6 | 6

Second round
(Spain) C Bucșa | 6 | 6
(United States) UM Arconada | 3 | 3
WC | (Switzerland) L Sun | 1 | 7^{7} | 2
3 | (United States) M Brengle | 6 | 6^{5} | 6
8 | (Mexico) R Zarazúa | 6 | 6
(United States) G Min | 1 | 3
(Brazil) B Haddad Maia | 3 | 1
2 | (Chinese Taipei) S-w Hsieh | 6 | 6

Quarterfinals
(Spain) C Bucșa | 3 | 5
3 | (United States) M Brengle | 6 | 7
8 | (Mexico) R Zarazúa | 6 | 2 | 7
2 | (Chinese Taipei) S-w Hsieh | 3 | 6 | 5

Semifinals
3 | (United States) M Brengle | 6 | 4 | 2
8 | (Mexico) R Zarazúa | 2 | 6 | 6

== Qualifying ==
=== Seeds ===
1. (Georgia (country)) Mariam Bolkvadze (qualified)
2. (Brazil) Beatriz Haddad Maia (moved to main draw)
3. (Ukraine) Kateryna Bondarenko (first round)
4. (United States) Robin Anderson (qualified)
5. (Germany) Mona Barthel (first round)
6. (United States) Whitney Osuigwe (first round)
7. (United Kingdom) Samantha Murray Sharan (qualifying competition)
8. (Chinese Taipei) Liang En-shuo (qualified)

=== Qualifiers ===
1. (Georgia (country)) Mariam Bolkvadze
2. (United States) Victoria Duval
3. (Chinese Taipei) Liang En-shuo
4. (United States) Robin Anderson

=== Lucky loser ===
1. (United States) Alexa Glatch

=== Qualifying draw ===
==== First qualifier ====
First round
1 | (Georgia (country)) Mariam Bolkvadze | 6 | 6
PR | (Thailand) Peangtarn Plipuech | 2 | 4
(United States) Sophie Chang | 6 | 6
5 | (Germany) Mona Barthel | 2 | 3

Qualifying competition
1 | (Georgia (country)) Mariam Bolkvadze | 6 | 6
(United States) Sophie Chang | 2 | 1

==== Second qualifier ====
First round
Alt | (United Kingdom) Eden Silva | 2 | 6 | 1
(United States) Victoria Duval | 6 | 4 | 6
WC | (United States) Brittany Collens | 5 | 0
7/PR | (United Kingdom) Samantha Murray Sharan | 7 | 6

Qualifying competition
(United States) Victoria Duval | 7 | 6
7/PR | (United Kingdom) Samantha Murray Sharan | 5 | 4

==== Third qualifier ====
First round
3 | (Ukraine) Kateryna Bondarenko | 7 | 4 | 5
(United States) Alexa Glatch | 5 | 6 | 7
(Chinese Taipei) Hsu Chieh-yu | 1 | 6 | 2
8/PR | (Chinese Taipei) Liang En-shuo | 6 | 4 | 6

Qualifying competition
(United States) Alexa Glatch | 6 | 2 | 3
8/PR | (Chinese Taipei) Liang En-shuo | 3 | 6 | 6

==== Fourth qualifier ====
First round
4 | (United States) Robin Anderson | 7 | 6
(United States) Catherine Harrison | 5 | 1
WC | (United States) Victoria Hu | 6 | 6
6 | (United States) Whitney Osuigwe | 4 | 2

Qualifying competition
4 | (United States) Robin Anderson | 6 | 6
WC | (United States) Victoria Hu | 4 | 3
