= 2021 Thoreau Tennis Open =

- Date: 2–8 August 2021
- Edition: 2nd
- Category: WTA 125
- Prize money: $115,000
- Surface: Hard
- Location: Concord, United States
- Venue: The Thoreau Club

Champions

Singles
- (Poland) Magdalena Fręch

Doubles
- (Thailand) Peangtarn Plipuech / (Indonesia) Jessy Rompies
← 2019 ·	Thoreau Tennis Open	· 2022 →

The 2021 Thoreau Tennis Open was a professional tennis tournament played on outdoor hard courts. It was the second edition of the tournament which is part of the 2021 WTA 125K series. The tournament had been upgraded from ITF 60K to WTA 125K, marking its first edition as a challenger event. It took place in Concord, United States between 2 and 8 August 2021. The tournament could not be staged in 2020 due to COVID-19 pandemic.

== Singles main-draw entrants ==
=== Seeds ===
Country	Player	Rank^{1}	Seed
~~BEL~~	~~Alison Van Uytvanck~~	~~59~~	~~1~~
TPE	Hsieh Su-wei	73	2
USA	Madison Brengle	75	3
RUS	Vera Zvonareva	88	4
USA	Lauren Davis	94	5
USA	Christina McHale	100	6
BEL	Greet Minnen	110	7
MEX	Renata Zarazúa	137	8
AUS	Storm Sanders	138	9

- ^{1} Rankings are as of 26 July 2021.

=== Other entrants ===
The following players received wildcards into the singles main draw:

- (United States) Alycia Parks
- (United States) Katrina Scott
- (Switzerland) Lulu Sun
- (United States) Sophia Whittle

The following player received entry using a protected ranking:

- (Canada) Rebecca Marino

The following players received entry from the qualifying draw:

- (United States) Robin Anderson
- (Georgia (country)) Mariam Bolkvadze
- (United States) Victoria Duval
- (Chinese Taipei) Liang En-shuo

The following player received entry as a lucky loser:

- (United States) Alexa Glatch

=== Withdrawals ===
Before the tournament

- (France) Clara Burel → replaced by (Canada) Rebecca Marino
- (Russia) Vitalia Diatchenko → replaced by (Brazil) Beatriz Haddad Maia
- (Russia) Anastasia Gasanova → replaced by (Germany) Tatjana Maria
- (Japan) Nao Hibino → replaced by (Japan) Kurumi Nara
- (Spain) Nuria Párrizas Díaz → replaced by (United States) Usue Maitane Arconada
- (Belgium) Alison Van Uytvanck → replaced by (United States) Alexa Glatch

== Doubles main-draw entrants ==
=== Seeds ===
Country	Player	Country	Player	Rank^{1}	Seed
TPE	Hsieh Su-wei	TPE	Hsieh Yu-chieh	182	1
~~IND~~	~~Ankita Raina~~	~~GBR~~	~~Eden Silva~~	~~275~~	~~2~~
UKR	Kateryna Bondarenko	GER	Tatjana Maria	279	3
USA	Quinn Gleason	USA	Jamie Loeb	336	4

- ^{1} Rankings are as of 26 July 2021.

=== Other entrants ===
The following pair received a wildcard into the doubles main draw:

- (United States) Brittany Collens / (United States) Victoria Hu

=== Withdrawals ===
Before the tournament

- (India) Ankita Raina / (United Kingdom) Eden Silva → replaced by (Germany) Mona Barthel / (India) Ankita Raina

== Champions ==
=== Singles ===
- (Poland) Magdalena Fręch def. (Mexico) Renata Zarazúa 6–3, 7–6^{(7–4)}

=== Doubles ===
- (Thailand) Peangtarn Plipuech / (Indonesia) Jessy Rompies def. (United States) Usue Maitane Arconada / (Spain) Cristina Bucșa 3–6, 7–6^{(7–5)}, [10–8]
