= 2019 Thoreau Tennis Open – Doubles =

Doubles
- 2019 Thoreau Tennis Open

Final
- Champions: (United States) Angela Kulikov (United States) Rianna Valdes
- Runners-up: (United States) Elizabeth Halbauer (United States) Ingrid Neel
- Score: 7–6^{(7–3)}, 4–6, [17–15]

Events
Singles	Doubles
Thoreau Tennis Open	· 2021 →

This was the first edition of the tournament.

Angela Kulikov and Rianna Valdes won the title, defeating Elizabeth Halbauer and Ingrid Neel in the final, 7–6^{(7–3)}, 4–6, [17–15].

== Seeds ==
1. (Montenegro) Danka Kovinić / (Serbia) Nina Stojanović (quarterfinals)
2. (Netherlands) Bibiane Schoofs / (Belgium) Yanina Wickmayer (quarterfinals)
3. (Chinese Taipei) Chen Pei-hsuan / (Chinese Taipei) Hsieh Yu-chieh (semifinals)
4. (Belarus) Olga Govortsova / (Russia) Valeria Savinykh (semifinals)

== Draw ==
=== Key ===
- Q = Qualifier
- WC = Wild card
- LL = Lucky loser
- Alt = Alternate
- ITF = ITF entry
- PR = Protected ranking
- SR = Special ranking
- SE = Special exempt
- JE = Junior exempt
- JR = Junior Accelerator Programme entrant
- CO = College Accelerator Programme entrant
- NG = Next Gen Accelerator Program entrant
- w/o = Walkover
- r = Retired
- d = Defaulted

=== Draw ===
First round
1	(Montenegro) D Kovinić (Serbia) N Stojanović	6	6
(United States) M Mateas (Hungary) P Udvardy	2	4
(United States) E Halbauer (United States) I Neel	6	6
(United States) K Fahey (United States) M Westby	1	4
4	(Belarus) O Govortsova (Russia) V Savinykh	6^{8}	7	[10]
(Hungary) A Bondár (Argentina) P Ormaechea	7^{10}	5	[1]
(Australia) Z Hives (Australia) B Woolcock	6	2	[5]
(United States) S Marand (United States) C Whoriskey	3	6	[10]
WC	(United States) B Collens (United States) N Semenovski	2	1
(China) S Xu (China) X You	6	6
(Georgia (country)) M Bolkvadze (Georgia (country)) E Gorgodze	7^{7}	5	[4]
3	(Chinese Taipei) P-h Chen (Chinese Taipei) Y-c Hsieh	6^{4}	7	[10]
(United States) S Chang (United States) A Mueller	3	2
WC	(United States) A Kulikov (United States) R Valdes	6	6
WC	(United States) E Campbell (United States) A Robins	2	0
2	(Netherlands) B Schoofs (Belgium) Y Wickmayer	6	6

Quarterfinals
1	(Montenegro) D Kovinić (Serbia) N Stojanović	3	3
(United States) E Halbauer (United States) I Neel	6	6
4	(Belarus) O Govortsova (Russia) V Savinykh	5	6	[10]
(United States) S Marand (United States) C Whoriskey	7	4	[6]
(China) S Xu (China) X You	1	2
3	(Chinese Taipei) P-h Chen (Chinese Taipei) Y-c Hsieh	6	6
WC	(United States) A Kulikov (United States) R Valdes	7	4	[10]
2	(Netherlands) B Schoofs (Belgium) Y Wickmayer	5	6	[7]

Semifinals
(United States) E Halbauer (United States) I Neel	7^{7}	7^{7}
4	(Belarus) O Govortsova (Russia) V Savinykh	6^{3}	6^{4}
3	(Chinese Taipei) P-h Chen (Chinese Taipei) Y-c Hsieh	2	4
WC	(United States) A Kulikov (United States) R Valdes	6	6

Final
(United States) E Halbauer (United States) I Neel	6^{3}	6	[15]
WC	(United States) A Kulikov (United States) R Valdes	7^{7}	4	[17]
