= 2019 Thoreau Tennis Open – Singles =

Tennis tournament

Singles
- 2019 Thoreau Tennis Open

Final
- Champion: (United States) Caroline Dolehide
- Runner-up: (United States) Ann Li
- Score: 6–3, 7–5

Events
Singles	Doubles
Thoreau Tennis Open	· 2021 →

This was the first edition of the tournament.

Caroline Dolehide won the title, defeating Ann Li in the final, 6–3, 7–5.

== Seeds ==
1. (United States) Christina McHale (second round)
2. (Montenegro) Danka Kovinić (first round)
3. (China) Zhu Lin (second round)
4. (Ukraine) Katarina Zavatska (second round)
5. (Romania) Ana Bogdan (quarterfinals)
6. (Ukraine) Anhelina Kalinina (second round)
7. (Russia) Varvara Flink (first round)
8. (United States) Allie Kiick (quarterfinals)

== Draw ==
=== Key ===
- Q = Qualifier
- WC = Wild card
- LL = Lucky loser
- Alt = Alternate
- ITF = ITF entry
- PR = Protected ranking
- SR = Special ranking
- SE = Special exempt
- JE = Junior exempt
- JR = Junior Accelerator Programme entrant
- CO = College Accelerator Programme entrant
- NG = Next Gen Accelerator Program entrant
- w/o = Walkover
- r = Retired
- d = Defaulted

=== Finals ===
Semifinals
Q	(Belarus) Olga Govortsova	6^{2}	4
WC	(United States) Caroline Dolehide	7^{7}	6
(United States) Usue Maitane Arconada	6	1	4
(United States) Ann Li	2	6	6

Final
WC	(United States) Caroline Dolehide	6	7
(United States) Ann Li	3	5

=== Top half ===
First round
1	(United States) C McHale	6	6
(Israel) J Glushko	3	2
Q	(Hungary) F Stollár	4	4
Q	(Belarus) O Govortsova	6	6
Q	(China) X You	3	2
Q	(Argentina) P Ormaechea	6	6
(Slovakia) K Kučová	1	4
8	(United States) A Kiick	6	6
3	(China) L Zhu	6	6
(Italy) M Trevisan	1	4
Q	(Serbia) N Stojanović	1	6	6^{3}
WC	(United States) C Dolehide	6	3	7^{7}
(Netherlands) B Schoofs	3	5
(France) J Ponchet	6	7
Q	(United States) S Whittle	0	6	4
5	(Romania) A Bogdan	6	3	6

Second round
1	(United States) C McHale	6	5	5
Q	(Belarus) O Govortsova	1	7	7
Q	(Argentina) P Ormaechea	2	2
8	(United States) A Kiick	6	6
3	(China) L Zhu	1	1
WC	(United States) C Dolehide	6	6
(France) J Ponchet	1	3
5	(Romania) A Bogdan	6	6

Quarterfinals
Q	(Belarus) O Govortsova	6	6
8	(United States) A Kiick	3	0
WC	(United States) C Dolehide	6	6
5	(Romania) A Bogdan	4	3

Semifinals
Q	(Belarus) O Govortsova	6^{2}	4
WC	(United States) C Dolehide	7^{7}	6

=== Bottom half ===
First round
6	(Ukraine) A Kalinina	6	6
(South Korea) N-l Han	1	3
(United States) UM Arconada	6	6
WC	(United States) B Collens	0	0
(Slovakia) J Čepelová	4	6	7
(Belgium) Y Wickmayer	6	2	5
WC	(United States) C Liu	4	2
4	(Ukraine) K Zavatska	6	6
7	(Russia) V Flink	6	4	6^{11}
(Chinese Taipei) E-s Liang	2	6	7^{13}
(United States) A Li	6	6^{2}	7^{10}
WC	(United States) E Halbauer	0	7^{7}	6^{8}
Q	(United States) S Chang	6	6
(Sweden) J Larsson	2	1
Q	(Poland) M Fręch	6	6
2	(Montenegro) D Kovinić	2	3

Second round
6	(Ukraine) A Kalinina	1	2
(United States) UM Arconada	6	6
(Slovakia) J Čepelová	6	6
4	(Ukraine) K Zavatska	1	0
(Chinese Taipei) E-s Liang	2	3
(United States) A Li	6	6
Q	(United States) S Chang	6^{4}	5
Q	(Poland) M Fręch	7^{7}	7

Quarterfinals
(United States) UM Arconada	7	6
(Slovakia) J Čepelová	5	3
(United States) A Li	6	6
Q	(Poland) M Fręch	3	2

Semifinals
(United States) UM Arconada	6	1	4
(United States) A Li	2	6	6
