= 2023 National Bank Open – Women's singles =

Women's singles
- 2023 National Bank Open

Final
- Champion: (United States) Jessica Pegula
- Runner-up: Liudmila Samsonova
- Score: 6–1, 6–0

Details
- Draw: 56
- Seeds: 16

Events
Singles	men	women
Doubles	men	women
- Canadian Open

Jessica Pegula defeated Liudmila Samsonova in the final, 6–1, 6–0 to win the women's singles title at the 2023 Canadian Open. It was her second WTA 1000 title. Due to rain, Samsonova had to play two matches (third round and quarterfinals) on Friday and two matches again (semifinals and final) on Sunday; she only had a two-hour break between the semifinal and final match. Pegula, on the other hand, played one match each day of the tournament from Wednesday through Sunday.

Simona Halep was the reigning champion, but could not defend her title due to a provisional suspension for violations of anti-doping rules.

Iga Świątek and Aryna Sabalenka were in contention for the WTA No. 1 ranking. Świątek retained the top ranking by reaching the quarterfinals.

This tournament marked the return to professional competition of former No. 1 player Caroline Wozniacki, who previously retired from the sport in 2020. She lost to reigning Wimbledon champion Markéta Vondroušová in the second round.

== Seeds ==
The top eight seeds received a bye into the second round.

1. (Poland) Iga Świątek (semifinals)
2. Aryna Sabalenka (third round)
3. (Kazakhstan) Elena Rybakina (semifinals)
4. (United States) Jessica Pegula (champion)
5. (France) Caroline Garcia (second round)
6. (United States) Coco Gauff (quarterfinals)
7. (Czech Republic) Petra Kvitová (third round)
8. (Greece) Maria Sakkari (second round)
9. (Czech Republic) Markéta Vondroušová (third round)
10. Daria Kasatkina (quarterfinals)
11. (Brazil) Beatriz Haddad Maia (second round)
12. (Switzerland) Belinda Bencic (quarterfinals)
13. (United States) Madison Keys (second round, withdrew)
14. (Czech Republic) Karolína Muchová (third round)
15. Liudmila Samsonova (final)
16. Victoria Azarenka (second round, withdrew)

Click on the seed number of a player to go to their draw section.

== Draw ==
Key

- Q = Qualifier
- WC = Wild card
- LL = Lucky loser
- Alt = Alternate
- ITF = ITF entry
- PR = Protected ranking
- SR = Special ranking
- SE = Special exempt
- JE = Junior exempt
- JR = Junior Accelerator Programme entrant
- CO = College Accelerator Programme entrant
- NG = Next Gen Accelerator Program entrant
- w/o = Walkover
- r = Retired
- d = Defaulted

=== Finals ===
Quarterfinals
1	(Poland) Iga Świątek	6	4	6
Q	(United States) Danielle Collins	3	6	2
4	(United States) Jessica Pegula	6	5	7
6	(United States) Coco Gauff	2	7	5
10	Daria Kasatkina	7	5	6^{8}
3	(Kazakhstan) Elena Rybakina	5	7	7^{10}
12	(Switzerland) Belinda Bencic	4	4
15	Liudmila Samsonova	6	6

Semifinals
1	(Poland) Iga Świątek	2	7^{7}	4
4	(United States) Jessica Pegula	6	6^{4}	6
3	(Kazakhstan) Elena Rybakina	6	1	2
15	Liudmila Samsonova	1	6	6

Final
4	(United States) Jessica Pegula	6	6
15	Liudmila Samsonova	1	0

=== Top half ===
==== Section 1 ====
First round
(China) L Zhu	3	7^{10}	2
(Czech Republic) Ka Plíšková	6	6^{8}	6
(France) V Gracheva	4	6^{3}
(Romania) S Cîrstea	6	7^{7}
A Potapova	6^{4}	2
14	(Czech Republic) K Muchová	7^{7}	6
11	(Brazil) B Haddad Maia	6	6
LL	(Poland) M Fręch	4	2
WC	(Canada) L Fernandez	6	6
Q	(United States) P Stearns	3	2
Q	(United States) D Collins	6	6
PR	(Ukraine) E Svitolina	2	2

Second round
1	(Poland) I Świątek	7^{8}	6
(Czech Republic) Ka Plíšková	6^{6}	2
(Romania) S Cîrstea	5	4
14	(Czech Republic) K Muchová	7	6
11	(Brazil) B Haddad Maia	5	7	3
WC	(Canada) L Fernandez	7	5	6
Q	(United States) D Collins	6	6
8	(Greece) M Sakkari	4	2

Third round
1	(Poland) I Świątek	6	4	6
14	(Czech Republic) K Muchová	1	6	4
WC	(Canada) L Fernandez	2	3
Q	(United States) D Collins	6	6

Quarterfinals
1	(Poland) I Świątek	6	4	6
Q	(United States) D Collins	3	6	2

==== Section 2 ====
First round
(United States) B Pera	3	4
LL	(Kazakhstan) Y Putintseva	6	6
(Italy) J Paolini	7^{7}	6
(Croatia) D Vekić	6^{3}	2
WC	(United States) V Williams	2	5
13	(United States) M Keys	6	7
9	(Czech Republic) M Vondroušová	6	6
(Egypt) M Sherif	4	2
WC	(Denmark) C Wozniacki	6	6
Q	(Australia) K Birrell	2	2
Q	(United Kingdom) K Boulter	6	6
WC	(Canada) R Marino	3	1

Second round
4	(United States) J Pegula	6	6
LL	(Kazakhstan) Y Putintseva	4	4
(Italy) J Paolini	w/o
13	(United States) M Keys
9	(Czech Republic) M Vondroušová	6	7
WC	(Denmark) C Wozniacki	2	5
Q	(United Kingdom) K Boulter	2	2
6	(United States) C Gauff	6	6

Third round
4	(United States) J Pegula	6	6
(Italy) J Paolini	4	0
9	(Czech Republic) M Vondroušová	3	0
6	(United States) C Gauff	6	6

Quarterfinals
4	(United States) J Pegula	6	5	7
6	(United States) C Gauff	2	7	5

=== Bottom half ===
==== Section 3 ====
First round
Q	(United States) K Day	6^{1}	3
(Czech Republic) M Bouzková	7^{7}	6
A Blinkova	4	6	6
(China) S Zhang	6	2	3
(Belgium) E Mertens	4	2
10	D Kasatkina	6	6
16	V Azarenka	6	6
(Poland) M Linette	3	0
(United States) S Stephens	6	7^{7}
(Ukraine) A Kalinina	4	6^{2}
PR	(United States) J Brady	7^{9}	0	7^{10}
(Latvia) J Ostapenko	6^{7}	6	6^{8}

Second round
5	(France) C Garcia	4	6	2
(Czech Republic) M Bouzková	6	4	6
A Blinkova	2	5
10	D Kasatkina	6	7
16	V Azarenka
(United States) S Stephens	w/o
PR	(United States) J Brady	7^{7}	6^{5}	3
3	(Kazakhstan) E Rybakina	6^{3}	7^{7}	6

Third round
(Czech Republic) M Bouzková	3	4
10	D Kasatkina	6	6
(United States) S Stephens	3	3
3	(Kazakhstan) E Rybakina	6	6

Quarterfinals
10	D Kasatkina	7	5	6^{8}
3	(Kazakhstan) E Rybakina	5	7	7^{10}

==== Section 4 ====
First round
Q	(Italy) C Giorgi	6	6
WC	(Canada) B Andreescu	3	2
Q	(United States) A Parks	7	4	6
(United States) L Davis	5	6	2
(Italy) L Bronzetti	2	3
12	(Switzerland) B Bencic	6	6
15	L Samsonova	4	6	6
(Czech Republic) K Siniaková	6	2	3
(Ukraine) M Kostyuk	2	6	3
(China) Q Zheng	6	1	6
(Croatia) P Martić	6	6
LL	(Spain) C Bucșa	0	4

Second round
7	(Czech Republic) P Kvitová	6	5	6
Q	(Italy) C Giorgi	2	7	0
Q	(United States) A Parks	3	7	4
12	(Switzerland) B Bencic	6	5	6
15	L Samsonova	6	6
(China) Q Zheng	3	2
(Croatia) P Martić	3	6^{5}
2	A Sabalenka	6	7^{7}

Third round
7	(Czech Republic) P Kvitová	7^{7}	3	1
12	(Switzerland) B Bencic	6^{3}	6	6
15	L Samsonova	7^{7}	4	6
2	A Sabalenka	6^{2}	6	3

Quarterfinals
12	(Switzerland) B Bencic	4	4
15	L Samsonova	6	6

== Seeded players ==
The following are the seeded players. Seedings are based on WTA rankings as of 31 July 2023. Rank and points before are as of 7 August 2023.

The event is not mandatory on the women's side and points from the 2022 tournament are included in the table below only if they counted towards the player's ranking as of 7 August 2023. For other players, the points defending column shows the player's 16th best result.

Points defending will be replaced at the end of the tournament by the highest of (a) the player's points from the 2023 tournament, (b) her 17th best result, or (c) points from her second-highest non-mandatory WTA 1000 event.

Seed	Rank	Player	Points before	Points defending	Points won	Points after	Status
1	1	(Poland) Iga Świątek	9,490	(110)^{†}	350	9,730	Semifinals lost to (United States) Jessica Pegula [4]
2	2	Aryna Sabalenka	8,746	105	105	8,746	Third round lost to Liudmila Samsonova [15]
3	4	(Kazakhstan) Elena Rybakina	5,465	60	350	5,755	Semifinals lost to Liudmila Samsonova [15]
4	3	(United States) Jessica Pegula	5,480	350	900	6,030	Champion, defeated Liudmila Samsonova [15]
5	6	(France) Caroline Garcia	4,685	(100)^{†}	1	4,685^{§}	Second round lost to (Czech Republic) Marie Bouzková
6	7	(United States) Coco Gauff	3,760	190	190	3,760	Quarterfinals lost to (United States) Jessica Pegula [4]
7	9	(Czech Republic) Petra Kvitová	3,341	1	105	3,445	Third round lost to (Switzerland) Belinda Bencic [12]
8	8	(Greece) Maria Sakkari	3,585	105	(30)^{†}	3,510	Second round lost to (United States) Danielle Collins [Q]
9	10	(Czech Republic) Markéta Vondroušová	3,106	0	105	3,211	Third round lost to (United States) Coco Gauff [6]
10	14	Daria Kasatkina	2,600	(55)^{†}	190	2,735	Quarterfinals lost (Kazakhstan) Elena Rybakina [3]
11	12	(Brazil) Beatriz Haddad Maia	2,745	585	60	2,220	Second round lost to (Canada) Leylah Fernandez [WC]
12	13	(Switzerland) Belinda Bencic	2,605	190	190	2,605	Quarterfinals lost to Liudmila Samsonova [15]
13	15	(United States) Madison Keys	2,580	(100)^{†}	60	2,580^{§}	Second round, withdrew due to a glute injury
14	17	(Czech Republic) Karolína Muchová	2,333	(15)^{‡}	105	2,423	Third round lost to (Poland) Iga Świątek [1]
15	18	Liudmila Samsonova	2,220	(60)^{†}	585	2,745	Runner-up, lost to (United States) Jessica Pegula [4]
16	19	Victoria Azarenka	2,176	(1)^{†}	60	2,235	Second round, withdrew due to injury

† Points from the player's 16th best result (for points defending) or 17th best result (for points earned), in each case as of 7 August 2023.
‡ The player is defending points from a WTA 125 tournament (Concord).
§ No change in points because points from this tournament did not count as one of the player's 16 best results.

=== Withdrawn players ===
The following players would have been seeded, but withdrew before the tournament began.

Rank	Player	Points before	Points defending	Points after	Withdrawal reason
5	(Tunisia) Ons Jabeur	4,747	1	4,746	Knee injury
11	(Czech Republic) Barbora Krejčíková	2,840	(30)^{†}	2,840^{§}	Ankle injury
16	Veronika Kudermetova	2,485	(100)^{†}	2,485^{§}	Hip injury

† Points from the player's 16th best result.
§ No change in points because the player's result from the 2022 tournament did not count towards her ranking as of 7 August 2023.

== Other entry information ==
=== Wild cards ===
- (Canada) Bianca Andreescu
- (Canada) Leylah Fernandez
- (Canada) Rebecca Marino
- (United States) Venus Williams
- (Denmark) Caroline Wozniacki

=== Protected ranking ===
- (United States) Jennifer Brady
- (Ukraine) Elina Svitolina

=== Withdrawals ===
- (Spain) Paula Badosa → replaced by (Poland) Magdalena Fręch
- (Tunisia) Ons Jabeur → replaced by (Kazakhstan) Yulia Putintseva
- (Czech Republic) Barbora Krejčíková → replaced by (Italy) Lucia Bronzetti
- Veronika Kudermetova → replaced by (United States) Lauren Davis
- (Ukraine) Lesia Tsurenko → replaced by (Spain) Cristina Bucșa

== Qualifying ==
=== Seeds ===
1. (Ukraine) Lesia Tsurenko (qualified, withdrew from main draw)
2. (United States) Alycia Parks (qualified)
3. (United States) Danielle Collins (qualified)
4. (Italy) Camila Giorgi (qualified)
5. (Czech Republic) Linda Fruhvirtová (first round)
6. (United States) Peyton Stearns (qualified)
7. (Kazakhstan) Yulia Putintseva (qualifying competition, lucky loser)
8. (United Kingdom) Katie Boulter (qualified)
9. (Poland) Magdalena Fręch (qualifying competition, lucky loser)
10. (Spain) Cristina Bucșa (qualifying competition, lucky loser)
11. (United Kingdom) Jodie Burrage (first round)
12. (United States) Kayla Day (qualified)
13. (Australia) Kimberly Birrell (qualified)
14. (China) Yuan Yue (first round)
15. (United States) Elizabeth Mandlik (qualifying competition)
16. (United States) Ashlyn Krueger (qualifying competition)

=== Qualifiers ===
1. ~~(Ukraine) Lesia Tsurenko~~
2. (United States) Alycia Parks
3. (United States) Danielle Collins
4. (Italy) Camila Giorgi
5. (United States) Kayla Day
6. (United States) Peyton Stearns
7. (Australia) Kimberly Birrell
8. (United Kingdom) Katie Boulter

=== Lucky losers ===
1. (Kazakhstan) Yulia Putintseva
2. (Poland) Magdalena Fręch
3. (Spain) Cristina Bucșa

=== Draw ===
==== First qualifier ====
First round
1	(Ukraine) Lesia Tsurenko	6	6
WC	(Canada) Bianca Fernandez	1	3
(South Korea) Han Na-lae	6	1	2
15	(United States) Elizabeth Mandlik	0	6	6

Qualifying competition
1	(Ukraine) Lesia Tsurenko	6	6
15	(United States) Elizabeth Mandlik	4	2

==== Second qualifier ====
First round
2	(United States) Alycia Parks	4	6	7
WC	(Canada) Marina Stakusic	6	4	5
(Canada) Carol Zhao	3	3
10	(Spain) Cristina Bucșa	6	6

Qualifying competition
2	(United States) Alycia Parks	6	6
10	(Spain) Cristina Bucșa	1	2

==== Third qualifier ====
First round
3	(United States) Danielle Collins	6	1	6
WC	(Canada) Eugenie Bouchard	1	6	1
(United States) Emina Bektas	6	2	6
14	(China) Yuan Yue	2	6	1

Qualifying competition
3	(United States) Danielle Collins	7	6^{10}	7
(United States) Emina Bektas	5	7^{12}	5

==== Fourth qualifier ====
First round
4	(Italy) Camila Giorgi	6	6
(United States) Elvina Kalieva	2	4
(Sweden) Mirjam Björklund	7	4	4
16	(United States) Ashlyn Krueger	5	6	6

Qualifying competition
4	(Italy) Camila Giorgi	6	4	6
16	(United States) Ashlyn Krueger	3	6	4

==== Fifth qualifier ====
First round
5	(Czech Republic) Linda Fruhvirtová	0	6	1
(United States) Sachia Vickery	6	3	6
(United States) Louisa Chirico	2	2
12	(United States) Kayla Day	6	6

Qualifying competition
(United States) Sachia Vickery	2	6	3
12	(United States) Kayla Day	6	1	6

==== Sixth qualifier ====
First round
6	(United States) Peyton Stearns	4	6	6
(Canada) Katherine Sebov	6	3	1
(Australia) Storm Hunter	2	2
9	(Poland) Magdalena Fręch	6	6

Qualifying competition
6	(United States) Peyton Stearns	6	6
9	(Poland) Magdalena Fręch	2	4

==== Seventh qualifier ====
First round
7	(Kazakhstan) Yulia Putintseva	2	6	6
WC	(Canada) Mia Kupres	6	2	0
(Australia) Daria Saville	3	4
13	(Australia) Kimberly Birrell	6	6

Qualifying competition
7	(Kazakhstan) Yulia Putintseva	2	4
13	(Australia) Kimberly Birrell	6	6

==== Eighth qualifier ====
First round
8	(United Kingdom) Katie Boulter	6	6
(Romania) Miriam Bulgaru	3	3
(Spain) Marina Bassols Ribera	7	6
11	(United Kingdom) Jodie Burrage	5	4

Qualifying competition
8	(United Kingdom) Katie Boulter	6	6
(Spain) Marina Bassols Ribera	2	2
