= 2019 Thoreau Tennis Open =

Tennis tournament

- Date: 12–17 August 2019
- Edition: 1st
- Category: ITF Women's World Tennis Tour
- Prize money: $60,000
- Surface: Hard
- Location: Concord, Massachusetts, United States

Champions

Singles
- (United States) Caroline Dolehide

Doubles
- (United States) Angela Kulikov / (United States) Rianna Valdes
Thoreau Tennis Open	· 2021 →

The 2019 Thoreau Tennis Open was a professional tennis tournament played on outdoor hard courts. It was the first edition of the tournament which was part of the 2019 ITF Women's World Tennis Tour. It took place in Concord, Massachusetts, United States between 12 and 17 August 2019.

== Singles main-draw entrants ==
=== Seeds ===
Country	Player	Rank^{1}	Seed
USA	Christina McHale	103	1
MNE	Danka Kovinić	114	2
CHN	Zhu Lin	125	3
UKR	Katarina Zavatska	133	4
ROU	Ana Bogdan	134	5
UKR	Anhelina Kalinina	136	6
RUS	Varvara Flink	143	7
USA	Allie Kiick	150	8

- ^{1} Rankings are as of 5 August 2019.

=== Other entrants ===
The following players received wildcards into the singles main draw:

- (United States) Brittany Collens
- (United States) Caroline Dolehide
- (United States) Elizabeth Halbauer
- (United States) Claire Liu

The following players received entry from the qualifying draw:

- (United States) Sophie Chang
- (Poland) Magdalena Fręch
- (Belarus) Olga Govortsova
- (Argentina) Paula Ormaechea
- (Serbia) Nina Stojanović
- (Hungary) Fanny Stollár
- (United States) Sophia Whittle
- (China) You Xiaodi

== Champions ==
=== Singles ===
- (United States) Caroline Dolehide def. (United States) Ann Li, 6–3, 7–5

=== Doubles ===
- (United States) Angela Kulikov / (United States) Rianna Valdes def. (United States) Elizabeth Halbauer / (United States) Ingrid Neel, 7–6^{(7–3)}, 4–6, [17–15]
