= 2022 Thoreau Tennis Open – Doubles =

Doubles
- 2022 Thoreau Tennis Open

Final
- Champions: Varvara Flink (United States) CoCo Vandeweghe
- Runners-up: (Thailand) Peangtarn Plipuech (Japan) Moyuka Uchijima
- Score: 6–3, 7–6^{(7–3)}

Events
Singles	Doubles
← 2021 ·	Thoreau Tennis Open	· 2023 →

Peangtarn Plipuech and Jessy Rompies were the defending champions but Rompies chose not to participate.

Plipuech partnered alongside Moyuka Uchijima, but lost in the final to Varvara Flink and CoCo Vandeweghe, 3–6, 6–7^{(3–7)}.

== Seeds ==
1. (Georgia (country)) Natela Dzalamidze / Kamilla Rakhimova (semifinals)
2. Amina Anshba / Yana Sizikova (quarterfinals)
3. Anna Blinkova / (Belgium) Greet Minnen (first round)
4. (Australia) Astra Sharma / (Indonesia) Aldila Sutjiadi (quarterfinals)

== Draw ==
=== Key ===
- Q = Qualifier
- WC = Wild card
- LL = Lucky loser
- Alt = Alternate
- SE = Special exempt
- PR = Protected ranking
- ITF = ITF entry
- JE = Junior exempt
- w/o = Walkover
- r = Retired
- d = Defaulted
- SR = Special ranking

=== Draw ===
First round
A Gasanova; A Tikhonova	6	6^{3}	[10]
(Germany) J Lohoff (Czech Republic) R Voráčová	2	7^{7}	[8]
4	(Australia) A Sharma (Indonesia) A Sutjiadi	6	6
(United States) B Collens (United States) V Hu	0	1
(United States) A Parks (Mexico) R Zarazúa	4	6^{6}
(Thailand) P Plipuech (Japan) M Uchijima	6	7^{8}
(United States) E Bolton (United States) J Loeb	6^{1}	6	[7]
L Marozava (Ukraine) K Volodko	7^{7}	3	[10]
V Flink (United States) C Vandeweghe	6	7
3	A Blinkova (Belgium) G Minnen	3	5
(Sweden) M Björklund (Mexico) F Contreras Gómez	2	6	[10]
(United States) K Day (China) Q Wang	6	3	[6]

Quarterfinals
1	(Georgia (country)) N Dzalamidze; K Rakhimova	6	7^{7}
A Gasanova; A Tikhonova	2	6^{5}
4	(Australia) A Sharma (Indonesia) A Sutjiadi	6^{2}	6	[6]
(Thailand) P Plipuech (Japan) M Uchijima	7^{7}	1	[10]
L Marozava (Ukraine) K Volodko	5	4
V Flink (United States) C Vandeweghe	7	6
(Sweden) M Björklund (Mexico) F Contreras Gómez	6	4	[16]
2	A Anshba; Y Sizikova	3	6	[14]

Semifinals
1	(Georgia (country)) N Dzalamidze; K Rakhimova	5	6	[8]
(Thailand) P Plipuech (Japan) M Uchijima	7	3	[10]
V Flink (United States) C Vandeweghe	6	6
(Sweden) M Björklund (Mexico) F Contreras Gómez	3	2

Final
(Thailand) P Plipuech (Japan) M Uchijima	3	6^{3}
V Flink (United States) C Vandeweghe	6	7
