= 2022 Thoreau Tennis Open – Singles =

Singles
- 2022 Thoreau Tennis Open

Final
- Champion: (United States) CoCo Vandeweghe
- Runner-up: (United States) Bernarda Pera
- Score: 6–3, 5–7, 6–4

Events
Singles	Doubles
← 2021 ·	Thoreau Tennis Open	· 2023 →

Magdalena Fręch was the defending champion but lost in the quarterfinals to Wang Qiang.

CoCo Vandeweghe won the title, defeating Bernarda Pera in the final, 6–3, 5–7, 6–4.

== Seeds ==
1. (Denmark) Clara Tauson (quarterfinals)
2. (United States) Bernarda Pera (final)
3. Varvara Gracheva (first round)
4. (Poland) Magdalena Fręch (quarterfinals)
5. (Switzerland) Viktorija Golubic (second round)
6. (China) Wang Xiyu (withdrew)
7. (Belgium) Greet Minnen (first round)
8. Kamilla Rakhimova (first round)

== Draw ==
=== Key ===
- Q = Qualifier
- WC = Wild card
- LL = Lucky loser
- Alt = Alternate
- SE = Special exempt
- PR = Protected ranking
- ITF = ITF entry
- JE = Junior exempt
- w/o = Walkover
- r = Retired
- d = Defaulted
- SR = Special ranking

=== Finals ===
Semifinals
WC	(United States) CoCo Vandeweghe	6	6
(China) Wang Qiang	4	3
Q	(United States) Katrina Scott	4	2
2	(United States) Bernarda Pera	6	6

Final
WC	(United States) CoCo Vandeweghe	6	5	6
2	(United States) Bernarda Pera	3	7	4

=== Top half ===
First Round
1/WC	(Denmark) C Tauson	6	6
(United Kingdom) K Boulter	2	3
(Mexico) R Zarazúa	2	3
(Australia) A Sharma	6	6
(United States) A Parks	4	4
WC	(United States) C Vandeweghe	6	6
Q	(Germany) E Lys	6	6
8	K Rakhimova	4	3
4	(Poland) M Fręch	6	6
A Tikhonova	4	2
A Gasanova	6	2	3
(United States) C McNally	4	6	6
(China) Q Wang	6	6
(Georgia (country)) M Bolkvadze	1	2
WC	(United States) A Krueger	3	7^{8}	6^{3}
5	(Switzerland) V Golubic	6	6^{6}	7^{7}

Second Round
1/WC	(Denmark) C Tauson	7	6
(Australia) A Sharma	5	2
WC	(United States) C Vandeweghe	6	6
Q	(Germany) E Lys	1	1
4	(Poland) M Fręch	4	6	7
(United States) C McNally	6	3	5
(China) Q Wang	6	0	6
5	(Switzerland) V Golubic	0	6	3

Quarterfinals
1/WC	(Denmark) C Tauson	5	6	4
WC	(United States) C Vandeweghe	7	3	6
4	(Poland) M Fręch	2	4
(China) Q Wang	6	6

Semifinals
WC	(United States) C Vandeweghe	6	6
(China) Q Wang	4	3

=== Bottom half ===
First Round
LL	(Japan) M Uchijima	1	1
Q	(United States) K Scott	6	6
(Czech Republic) K Muchová	6	6
(Sweden) M Björklund	2	1
WC	(United States) T Townsend	6	6
WC	(Switzerland) L Sun	3	0
(Belgium) Y Bonaventure	6	7
3	V Gracheva	2	5
7	(Belgium) G Minnen	4	7	4
(United States) K Volynets	6	5	6
Q	(Ukraine) K Volodko	3	5
(France) H Tan	6	7
A Blinkova	6	6^{5}	6
PR	V Flink	3	7^{7}	2
Q	(United States) K Day	4	5
2	(United States) B Pera	6	7

Second Round
Q	(United States) K Scott	6	4
(Czech Republic) K Muchová	3	0^{r}
WC	(United States) T Townsend	6	4	6
(Belgium) Y Bonaventure	1	6	4
(United States) K Volynets	4	6	7^{7}
(France) H Tan	6	0	6^{4}
A Blinkova	6	6^{6}	3
2	(United States) B Pera	2	7^{8}	6

Quarterfinals
Q	(United States) K Scott	6	3	6
WC	(United States) T Townsend	3	6	4
(United States) K Volynets	3	1
2	(United States) B Pera	6	6

Semifinals
Q	(United States) K Scott	4	2
2	(United States) B Pera	6	6

== Qualifying ==
=== Seeds ===
1. (Japan) Moyuka Uchijima (qualifying competition, lucky loser)
2. (United States) Emma Navarro (first round)
3. (Germany) Eva Lys (qualified)
4. (Mexico) Renata Zarazúa (moved into main draw)
5. (Mexico) Fernanda Contreras Gómez (qualifying competition)
6. (Australia) Lizette Cabrera (qualifying competition)
7. (United States) Kayla Day (qualified)
8. (Colombia) Emiliana Arango (qualifying competition)

=== Qualifiers ===
1. (United States) Kayla Day
2. (United States) Katrina Scott
3. (Germany) Eva Lys
4. (Ukraine) Kateryna Volodko

=== Lucky losers ===
1. (Japan) Moyuka Uchijima

=== Qualifying draw ===
==== First qualifier ====
First Round
1	(Japan) Moyuka Uchijima	6	7
Amina Anshba	3	5
(United States) Jamie Loeb	2	1
7	(United States) Kayla Day	6	6

Qualifying Competition
1	(Japan) Moyuka Uchijima	3	6	0
7	(United States) Kayla Day	6	4	6

==== Second qualifier ====
First Round
2	(United States) Emma Navarro	1	2
(United States) Katrina Scott	6	6
PR	(Australia) Kaylah McPhee	4	1
5	(Mexico) Fernanda Contreras Gómez	6	6

Qualifying Competition
(United States) Katrina Scott	6	6
5	(Mexico) Fernanda Contreras Gómez	4	2

==== Third qualifier ====
First Round
3	(Germany) Eva Lys	6	6
WC	(United States) Brittany Collens	2	0
(United States) Victoria Duval	3	3
8/PR	(Colombia) Emiliana Arango	6	6

Qualifying Competition
3	(Germany) Eva Lys	6	7
8/PR	(Colombia) Emiliana Arango	2	5

==== Fourth qualifier ====
First Round
Alt	(Ukraine) Kateryna Volodko	6	6
WC	(United States) Jessie Aney	3	2
(United States) Elvina Kalieva	2	5
6	(Australia) Lizette Cabrera	6	7

Qualifying Competition
Alt	(Ukraine) Kateryna Volodko	6	6
6	(Australia) Lizette Cabrera	2	2
