= Bernarda Pera =

American tennis player (born 1994)

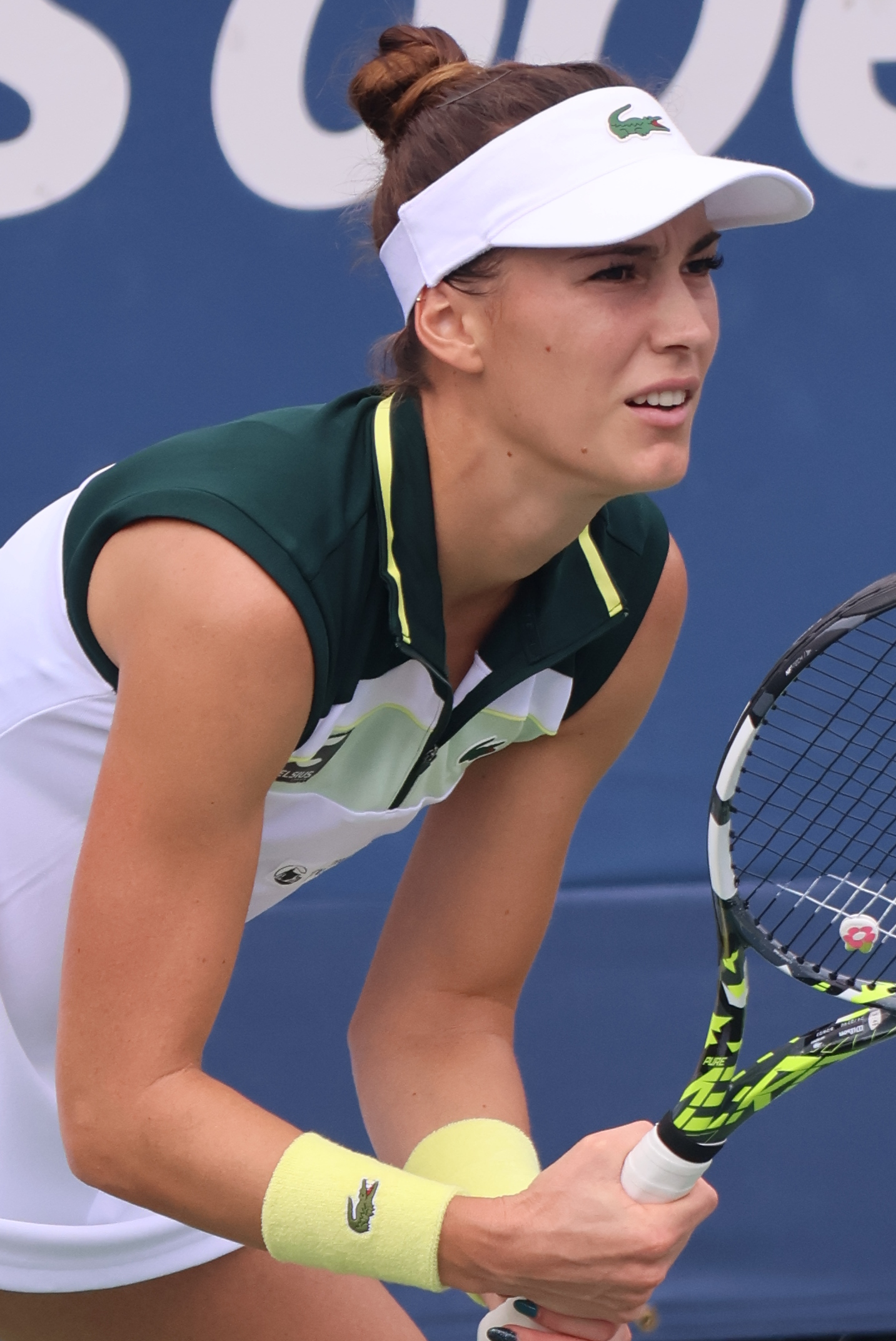
- Pera at the 2023 US Open
- Country (sports): Croatia (2009 – Jan 2013); United States (March 2013 – present)
- Born: December 3, 1994 (age 31) Zadar, Croatia
- Height: 1.76 m (5 ft 9 in)
- Turned pro: 2014
- Plays: Left (two-handed backhand)
- Coach: Guillermo Cañas
- Prize money: $5,161,425

Singles
- Career record: 418–284
- Career titles: 2
- Highest ranking: No. 27 (June 12, 2023)

Grand Slam singles results
- Australian Open: 3R (2018, 2023)
- French Open: 4R (2023)
- Wimbledon: 3R (2024)
- US Open: 3R (2023)

Doubles
- Career record: 114–96
- Career titles: 1
- Highest ranking: No. 35 (February 21, 2022)

Grand Slam doubles results
- Australian Open: 3R (2021, 2022)
- French Open: SF (2021)
- Wimbledon: 2R (2023, 2025)
- US Open: QF (2023)

Grand Slam mixed doubles results
- Australian Open: 2R (2022)
- French Open: 1R (2022)
- Wimbledon: 2R (2023)
- US Open: 2R (2022)

Bernarda Pera (/bərˈnɑːrdə ˈpɛrə/ bər-NAR-də PERR-ə; Croatian pronunciation: [běrnaːrda pêra]; born December 3, 1994) is a Croatian-born inactive American tennis player. She has a career-high WTA singles ranking of No. 27, achieved on June 12, 2023 and a best of No. 35 in doubles, reached on February 21, 2022.

Pera has won two titles in singles and one in doubles on the WTA Tour, as well as 17 titles combined on the ITF Women's Tour. Before March 2013, she represented her country of birth, Croatia.

== Early life and background ==
Pera was born in a Croatian-Dalmatian Italian family. In addition to English, she speaks Croatian. When she was 16, her father, who is a U.S. citizen, moved their family to the United States for the benefit of her budding tennis career. They settled in New Jersey, where friends and relatives already were living.

== Career ==
=== 2014: WTA Tour debut ===
Pera made her WTA Tour debut at the 2014 US Open, having been handed a wildcard into the doubles draw, partnering with Tornado Alicia Black.

=== 2018: Major singles debut, first tour semifinal ===
Pera made her major singles debut at the 2018 Australian Open, where she received entry as a lucky loser, after Margarita Gasparyan withdrew from the tournament. She defeated Anna Blinkova in the first round. In the second round, Pera knocked out ninth seed Johanna Konta. In the third round, she was beaten by Barbora Strýcová.

She made it through to the quarterfinals at the Charleston Open, losing to seventh seed Madison Keys in three sets.

At the 2018 Guangzhou Open, Pera defeated fourth seed Aleksandra Krunić in the quarterfinals to reach her first WTA Tour semifinal, which she lost to fifth seed Yulia Putintseva.

=== 2019–20: Three semifinals ===
2019 Prague Open, she defeated third seed Wang Qiang in the quarterfinals, before losing in the last four to wildcard entrant Karolína Muchová.

She also reached the semifinals at the 2019 Lausanne Open, but lost to eventual champion Fiona Ferro, and the 2019 Baltic Open, where she was defeated by Katarzyna Kawa.

Coming through qualifying at the first edition of the 2020 Adelaide International, she defeated Barbora Strýcová in the first round then lost in the second to sixth seed Aryna Sabalenka. At the Australian Open, she lost in the first round to 29th seed Elena Rybakina.

As a qualifier at the 2020 Qatar Ladies Open, Pera was defeated in the second round by third seed Karolína Plíšková. Seeded third at the Indian Wells Challenger, she lost in the third round to 13th seed Misaki Doi. The WTA Tour cancelled tournaments from March through July due to the COVID-19 pandemic.

When the WTA resumed tournament play in August, Pera competed at the 2020 Lexington Challenger where she was eliminated in the first round by top seed Serena Williams. At the 2020 Cincinnati Open, she was defeated in the second round by 16th seed Dayana Yastremska. At the US Open, she reached the second round defeating Zarina Diyas before losing to 15th seed Maria Sakkari.

At the 2020 Italian Open, Pera was defeated in the first round by Svetlana Kuznetsova. At the 2020 Internationaux de Strasbourg, she lost in the first round to Kateřina Siniaková. She suffered a second round loss at the French Open at the hands of 25th seed Amanda Anisimova.

=== 2021: French Open doubles semifinal ===
Pera kicked off her 2021 season at the first edition of the Abu Dhabi Open where she beat 16th seed, Donna Vekić, in the first round before losing to Sara Sorribes Tormo. At the first edition of the Gippsland Trophy, she was defeated in the second round by fifth seed Johanna Konta. At the Australian Open, she eliminated 23rd seed and 2016 champion, Angelique Kerber, in the first round. In the second, she fell to Zarina Diyas. In Adelaide, she lost in the first round of qualifying to Storm Sanders.

In March, Pera played at the Dubai Championships where she was defeated in the first round by Anastasija Sevastova. At Miami, she lost in round one to Sara Sorribes Tormo.

Starting into the clay-court season at the Charleston Open, Pera fell in the first round to Alizé Cornet. At Istanbul, she faced third seed Veronika Kudermetova in the first round; after pushing her to three sets, she ended up losing the match. Getting past qualifying at the Madrid Open, she was defeated in the second round by eighth seed Belinda Bencic. Making it through the qualifying rounds in Rome, she lost her second-round encounter against 12th seed Garbiñe Muguruza. Competing at the first edition of the Emilia-Romagna Open, she was defeated in the first round by seventh seed Sorribes Tormo. At the French Open, she took top seed and 2019 champion, Ashleigh Barty, to three sets but ended up losing her first round match. In doubles, she and Magda Linette reached the semifinals in which they lost to second seeds Barbora Krejčíková and Kateřina Siniaková.

After qualifying at Eastbourne, Pera was defeated in the first round by top seed Aryna Sabalenka. At Wimbledon, she lost in the first round to Nao Hibino.

After Wimbledon, Pera played at the Hamburg Open. Seeded seventh, she was defeated in the second round by Ysaline Bonaventure. Seeded third at the Budapest Grand Prix, she lost in the second round to eventual finalist, Anhelina Kalinina.

In August, Pera at the Canadian Open she was defeated in the first round of qualifying by Harriet Dart. In the doubles at the same tournament, she reached her first WTA 1000 semifinal with Magda Linette.

At the Cincinnati Open, she lost in the second round to eventual finalist Jil Teichmann. Before the final Grand Slam championship of the year, she competed at the first edition of the Cleveland Open where she was defeated in the first round by fifth seed Nadia Podoroska. At the US Open, she lost her first round match to Tamara Zidanšek.

=== 2022: First career titles ===
Pera won her first WTA Tour title in doubles, at the Melbourne Summer Set 2, alongside Kateřina Siniaková. As a result, she reached world No. 35 in doubles on 21 February 2022.

She qualified for the Budapest Grand Prix, and defeated Marina Bassols Ribera, fifth seed Aliaksandra Sasnovich, Elisabetta Cocciaretto and ninth seed Anna Bondár to reach her first WTA Tour singles final as a qualifier. She then defeated Aleksandra Krunić to win her maiden singles title.

She reached a second consecutive final at the Hamburg Open by defeating defending champion Elena-Gabriela Ruse, Joanne Züger, Kateřina Siniaková and Maryna Zanevska. Pera then upset top seed and world No. 2, Anett Kontaveit, in the final, for her second career top-10 win and her second career singles title, stretching her winning streak to 12 matches and 24 consecutive sets. With this result, she climbed to a new career-high singles ranking of No. 54.

In August, Pera reached the semifinals at Cleveland where she lost to Liudmila Samsonova in straight sets. She finished the year ranked No. 44 in the singles rankings, a career-high year-end.

=== 2023: French Open fourth round, top 30 in singles ===
As fourth seed, Pera made the quarterfinals at the Hobart International, where she was defeated by Elisabetta Cocciaretto. At the Australian Open, she reached the third round for the second time with wins over Moyuka Uchijima and 29th seed Zheng Qinwen. She lost to seventh seed Coco Gauff.

Seeded fourth at the Strasbourg Open, Pera recorded wins over lucky loser Sophie Chang and Kimberly Birrell to make it through to the quarterfinals, where she lost to Clara Burel.

At the French Open, she reached the fourth round of a major for the first time, defeating Anett Kontaveit, 22nd seed Donna Vekić and Elisabetta Cocciaretto, before losing to seventh seed Ons Jabeur. As a result, for the first time in her career, she had a ranking in the top 30.

Seeking to defend her title at the Hamburg Open, Pera overcame qualifier Zeynep Sönmez and Kaia Kanepi to make it into the quarterfinals, where she lost to Diana Shnaider.

=== 2024: Wimbledon third round ===
Pera was runner-up at the WTA 125 Veneto Open, losing to Alycia Parks in the final. She reached the third round at Wimbledon for the first time with wins over Anastasia Potapova and 23rd seed Caroline Garcia, before losing to 13th seed Jelena Ostapenko.

In October at the Guangzhou Open, Pera overcame qualifier Alexandra Eala and wildcard entrant Zhang Shuai to make it into the quarterfinals, at which point she lost to top seed Kateřina Siniaková. The following week at the Hong Kong Open, she again reached the quarterfinals by defeating Sara Saito and qualifier Shi Han, before losing to third seed Leylah Fernandez.

=== 2025: Billie Jean King Cup debut ===
At the Auckland Open, Pera recorded wins over qualifier Victoria Jiménez Kasintseva and Rebecca Marino, before losing to Robin Montgomery in the quarterfinals.

Pera made her debut for the United States Billie Jean King Cup team in the 2025 qualifying round held in Bratislava, defeating Johanne Svendsen and Rebecca Šramková in wins over Denmark and Slovakia, respectively, as her country topped the group to make it through to the finals.

At the French Open, she overcame Caroline Garcia and 18th seed Donna Vekić to reach the third round, at which point her run was ended by 13th seed Elina Svitolina.

On 13 October, after failing to win a WTA Tour main-draw match for four months, Pera fell to her lowest ranking since September 2017 at world No. 136.

== Personal life ==
Since 2018, Pera has been in a relationship with Croatian basketball player Kristijan Krajina.

== Performance timelines ==
Key
W	F	SF	QF	#R	RR	Q#	P#	DNQ	A	Z#	PO	G	S	B	NMS	NTI	P	NH

(W) winner; (F) finalist; (SF) semifinalist; (QF) quarterfinalist; (#R) rounds 4, 3, 2, 1; (RR) round-robin stage; (Q#) qualification round; (P#) preliminary round; (DNQ) did not qualify; (A) absent; (Z#) Davis/Fed Cup Zonal Group (with number indication) or (PO) play-off; (G) gold, (S) silver or (B) bronze Olympic/Paralympic medal; (NMS) not a Masters tournament; (NTI) not a Tier I tournament; (P) postponed; (NH) not held; (SR) strike rate (events won / competed); (W–L) win–loss record.
To avoid confusion and double counting, these charts are updated at the conclusion of a tournament or when the player's participation has ended.

Only main-draw results in WTA Tour, Grand Slam tournaments, Billie Jean King Cup, United Cup, Hopman Cup and Olympic Games are included in win–loss records.

=== Singles ===
Current through the 2025 US Open.

Tournament	2014	2015	2016	2017	2018	2019	2020	2021	2022	2023	2024	2025	SR	W–L	Win %
Grand Slam tournaments
Australian Open	A	A	A	A	3R	1R	1R	2R	2R	3R	1R	1R	0 / 8	6–8	43%
French Open	A	A	A	A	2R	1R	2R	1R	1R	4R	2R	3R	0 / 8	8–8	50%
Wimbledon	A	A	A	A	1R	1R	NH	1R	1R	1R	3R	1R	0 / 7	2–7	22%
US Open	Q1	Q1	A	Q3	2R	1R	2R	1R	1R	3R	1R	Q1	0 / 7	4–7	36%
Win–loss	0–0	0–0	0–0	0–0	4–4	0–4	2–3	1–4	1–4	7–4	3–4	2–3	0 / 30	20–30	40%
WTA 1000
Qatar Open (Note: The first Premier 5 event of the year has switched back and forth between the Dubai Tennis Championships and the Qatar Ladies Open since 2009. Dubai was classified as a Premier 5 event from 2009 to 2011 before being succeeded by Doha for the 2012–2014 period. In 2015, Dubai regained its Premier 5 status while Doha was demoted to Premier status. The Premier 5 tournaments were reclassified as WTA 1000 tournaments in 2021.)	A	NMS	A	NMS	1R	NMS	2R	NMS	Q1	NMS	1R	A	0 / 3	1–3	25%
Dubai	NMS	A	NMS	A	NMS	1R	NMS	1R	NMS	1R	1R	Q2	0 / 4	0–4	0%
Indian Wells Open	A	A	A	A	Q2	2R	NH	A	A	3R	2R	1R	0 / 4	4–4	50%
Miami Open	A	A	A	A	2R	Q1	NH	1R	A	1R	1R	2R	0 / 5	2–5	29%
Madrid Open	A	A	A	A	3R	A	NH	2R	A	3R	1R	2R	0 / 5	5–5	50%
Italian Open	A	A	A	A	Q1	A	1R	2R	A	2R	2R	Q1	0 / 4	2–4	33%
Canadian Open	A	A	A	A	Q2	A	NH	Q1	A	1R	1R	1R	0 / 3	0–3	0%
Cincinnati Open	A	A	A	A	Q2	1R	2R	2R	A	1R	Q1	1R	0 / 5	2–5	29%
Guadalajara Open	NH								1R	A	NMS		0 / 1	0–1	0%
China Open	A	A	A	A	1R	1R	NH			Q1	A	A	0 / 2	0–2	0%
Wuhan Open	A	A	A	Q2	1R	2R	NH				2R	A	0 / 3	2–3	40%
Win–loss	0–0	0–0	0–0	0–0	3–5	2–5	2–3	3–5	0–1	3–7	3–8	2–3	0 / 37	18–37	33%
Career statistics
	2014	2015	2016	2017	2018	2019	2020	2021	2022	2023	2024	2025	SR	W–L	Win %
Tournaments	0	0	0	1	13	16	10	21	12	21	19	10	Career total: 123		
Titles	0	0	0	0	0	0	0	0	2	0	0	0	Career total: 2		
Finals	0	0	0	0	0	0	0	0	2	0	0	0	Career total: 2		
Hard win–loss	0–0	0–0	0–0	0–1	7–8	5–10	4–7	6–11	4–7	8–11	7–13	5–7	0 / 75	46–75	38%
Clay win–loss	0–0	0–0	0–0	0–0	6–4	9–4	1–3	4–8	11–2	10–7	3–4	1–3	2 / 37	45–35	56%
Grass win–loss	0–0	0–0	0–0	0–0	0–1	1–2	0–0	0–2	0–1	1–3	2–2	0–0	0 / 11	4–11	27%
Overall win–loss	0–0	0–0	0–0	0–1	13–13	15–16	5–10	10–21	15–10	19–21	12–19	6–10	2 / 123	95–121	44%
Win (%)	–	–	–	0%	50%	48%	33%	32%	60%	48%	39%	38%	Career total: 44%		
Year-end ranking (Note: 2011: WTA ranking–1031, 2012: WTA ranking–646, 2013: WTA ranking–361.)	348	255	318	127	68	65	61	93	44	68	75	159	$5,161,425		

=== Doubles ===
Current through the 2024 WTA Tour.

Tournament	2014	...	2017	2018	2019	2020	2021	2022	2023	2024	SR	W–L	Win %
Grand Slam tournaments
Australian Open	A		A	A	1R	2R	3R	3R	1R	A	0 / 5	5–5	50%
French Open	A		A	A	A	1R	SF	1R	1R	2R	0 / 5	5–5	50%
Wimbledon	A		A	1R	1R	NH	1R	1R	2R	A	0 / 5	1–5	17%
US Open	1R		A	1R	3R	1R	2R	3R	QF	A	0 / 7	8–7	53%
Win–loss	0–1		0–0	0–2	2–3	1–3	7–4	4–4	4–4	1–1	0 / 22	19–22	46%
WTA 1000
Italian Open	A		A	A	A	QF	A	A			0 / 1	2–1	67%
Canadian Open	A		A	A	A	NH	SF	A			0 / 1	3–1	75%
Cincinnati Open	A		A	A	A	1R	1R	A			0 / 2	0–2	0%
Career statistics
Tournaments	1		1	2	4	6	8	5	1		Career total: 28		
Titles	0		0	0	0	0	0	1	0		Career total: 1		
Finals	0		0	0	0	0	0	1	0		Career total: 1		
Overall win–loss	0–1		0–1	0–2	2–4	3–6	12–7	8–4	0–1		1 / 28	25–26	49%
Year-end ranking	378		399	923	279	147	51	97	72	144			

== WTA Tour finals ==
=== Singles: 2 (2 titles) ===
Legend WTA 250 (2–0)	Finals by surface Clay (2–0)	Finals by setting Outdoor (2–0)

Result	W–L	Date	Tournament	Tier	Surface	Opponent	Score
Win	1–0	Jul 2022	Budapest Grand Prix, Hungary	WTA 250	Clay	(Serbia) Aleksandra Krunić	6–3, 6–3
Win	2–0	Jul 2022	Hamburg European Open, Germany	WTA 250	Clay	(Estonia) Anett Kontaveit	6–2, 6–4

=== Doubles: 1 (title) ===
Legend WTA 250 (1–0)	Finals by surface Hard (1–0)

Result	Date	Tournament	Tier	Surface	Partner	Opponents	Score
Win	Jan 2022	Melbourne Summer Set, Australia	WTA 250	Hard	(Czech Republic) Kateřina Siniaková	(Czech Republic) Tereza Martincová (Egypt) Mayar Sherif	6–2, 6–7^{(7–9)}, [10–5]

== WTA 125 finals ==
=== Singles: 3 (3 runner-ups) ===
Result	W–L	Date	Tournament	Surface	Opponent	Score
Loss	0–1	May 2022	Karlsruhe Open, Germany	Clay	(Egypt) Mayar Sherif	2–6, 4–6
Loss	0–2	Aug 2022	Concord Open, United States	Hard	(United States) CoCo Vandeweghe	3–6, 7–5, 4–6
Loss	0–3	Jun 2024	Veneto Open, Italy	Grass	(United States) Alycia Parks	4–6, 1–6

== ITF Circuit finals ==
=== Singles: 20 (9 titles, 11 runner-ups) ===
Legend $100,000 tournaments (1–0) $80,000 tournaments (1–0) $25,000 tournaments (2–5) $10/15,000 tournaments (5–6)	Finals by surface Hard (1–0) Clay (7–11) Carpet (1–0)

Result	W–L	Date	Tournament	Tier	Surface	Opponent	Score
Loss	0–1	Apr 2012	ITF Bol, Croatia	10,000	Clay	(France) Anaïs Laurendon	4–6, 6–4, 3–6
Loss	0–2	Jun 2012	ITF Sarajevo, Bosnia & Herzegovina	10,000	Clay	(Romania) Camelia Hristea	3–6, 6–3, 4–6
Loss	0–3	Oct 2012	ITF Solin, Croatia	10,000	Clay	(Croatia) Ana Savić	7–5, 2–6, 5–7
Loss	0–4	Mar 2013	ITF Madrid, Spain	10,000	Clay (i)	(Hungary) Réka Luca Jani	6–2, 4–6, 4–6
Loss	0–5	Mar 2013	ITF Bol, Croatia	10,000	Clay	(Hungary) Ágnes Bukta	7–5, 2–6, 5–7
Win	1–5	Jun 2013	ITF Alkmaar, Netherlands	10,000	Clay	(Serbia) Natalija Kostić	6–1, 6–2
Win	2–5	Jun 2013	ITF Breda, Netherlands	10,000	Clay	(Bulgaria) Isabella Shinikova	6–4, 4–6, 6–0
Win	3–5	Sep 2013	ITF Rotterdam, Netherlands	10,000	Clay	(France) Amandine Hesse	1–6, 6–3, 7–5
Win	4–5	Apr 2014	ITF Gloucester, UK	10,000	Hard (i)	(Belgium) Klaartje Liebens	6–3, 6–1
Loss	4–6	Jun 2014	ITF Amstelveen, Netherlands	10,000	Clay	(Netherlands) Quirine Lemoine	6–2, 4–6, 2–6
Win	5–6	Jun 2014	ITF Breda, Netherlands	15,000	Clay	(Brazil) Beatriz Haddad Maia	6–1, 7–6^{(8)}
Win	6–6	Jul 2015	ITF Imola, Italy	25,000	Carpet	(France) Sherazad Reix	6–2, 6–3
Loss	6–7	Apr 2016	ITF Pelham, United States	25,000	Clay	(United States) Grace Min	4–6, 4–6
Loss	6–8	Apr 2017	ITF Pula, Italy	25,000	Clay	(Canada) Bianca Andreescu	7–6^{(8)}, 2–6, 6–7^{(8)}
Loss	6–9	Apr 2017	ITF Pula, Italy	25,000	Clay	(Italy) Georgia Brescia	1–6, 2–6
Loss	6–10	May 2017	ITF Dunakeszi, Hungary	25,000	Clay	(Ukraine) Marta Kostyuk	4–6, 3–6
Win	7–10	Jul 2017	ITF Stuttgart, Germany	25,000	Clay	(Germany) Anna Zaja	6–4, 6–4
Loss	7–11	Jul 2017	ITF Darmstadt, Germany	25,000	Clay	(Ukraine) Anhelina Kalinina	2–6, 6–0, 3–6
Win	8–11	Jul 2017	ITS Cup, Czech Republic	80,000+H	Clay	(Czech Republic) Kristýna Plíšková	7–5, 4–6, 6–3
Win	9–11	May 2019	Empire Slovak Open, Slovakia	100,000	Clay	(Russia) Anna Blinkova	7–5, 7–5

=== Doubles: 15 (8 titles, 7 runner-ups) ===
Legend $75,000 tournaments (1–0) $50,000 tournaments (0–2) $25,000 tournaments (3–3) $10,000 tournaments (4–2)	Finals by surface Hard (1–2) Clay (7–3) Carpet (0–2)

Result	W–L	Date	Tournament	Tier	Surface	Partner	Opponents	Score
Loss	0–1	Apr 2013	ITF Bol, Croatia	10k	Clay	(Croatia) Jana Fett	(Czech Republic) Barbora Krejčíková (Russia) Polina Leykina	3–6, 3–6
Loss	0–2	Jun 2013	ITF Alkmaar, Netherlands	10k	Clay	(Italy) Gaia Sanesi	(Netherlands) Kim van der Horst (Netherlands) Monique Zuur	3–6, 6–7^{(5)}
Win	1–2	Aug 2013	ITF Enschede, Netherlands	10k	Clay	(Belarus) Sviatlana Pirazhenka	(Netherlands) Anna Alzate Esmurzaeva (Netherlands) Rosalie van der Hoek	6–2, 6–1
Win	2–2	Jun 2014	ITF Amstelveen, Netherlands	10k	Hard	(Bulgaria) Viktoriya Tomova	(Argentina) Tatiana Búa (Brazil) Beatriz Haddad Maia	6–0, 2–1 ret.
Win	3–2	Jun 2014	ITF Alkmaar, Netherlands	10k	Clay	(Brazil) Beatriz Haddad Maia	(Netherlands) Charlotte van der Meij (Netherlands) Mandy Wagemaker	6–1, 1–6, [10–5]
Loss	3–3	Aug 2014	ITF Koksijde, Belgium	25k	Clay	(Netherlands) Demi Schuurs	(Belgium) Ysaline Bonaventure (Netherlands) Richèl Hogenkamp	4–6, 4–6
Loss	3–4	Nov 2014	John Newcombe Challenge, United States	50k	Hard	(United States) Alexa Glatch	(Colombia) Mariana Duque Mariño (Paraguay) Verónica Cepede Royg	0–6, 3–6
Win	4–4	Jun 2015	ITF Helsingborg, Sweden	25k	Clay	(Turkey) Pemra Özgen	(Georgia (country)) Ekaterine Gorgodze (Sweden) Cornelia Lister	6–2, 6–0
Loss	4–5	Jul 2015	ITF Imola, Italy	25k	Carpet (i)	(Greece) Despina Papamichail	(Italy) Claudia Giovine (Switzerland) Xenia Knoll	5–7, 2–6
Win	5–5	Aug 2015	Prague Open, Czech Republic	75k	Clay	(Czech Republic) Kateřina Kramperová	(Czech Republic) Miriam Kolodziejová (Czech Republic) Markéta Vondroušová	7–6^{(4)}, 5–7, [10–1]
Loss	5–6	Feb 2016	ITF Kreuzlingen, Switzerland	50k	Carpet (i)	(Croatia) Tena Lukas	(Germany) Antonia Lottner (Switzerland) Amra Sadiković	7–5, 2–6, [5–10]
Win	6–6	Mar 2016	ITF Le Havre, France	10k	Clay	(United States) Sabrina Santamaria	(Spain) Georgina García Pérez (Latvia) Diāna Marcinkēviča	6–2, 6–2
Loss	6–7	Oct 2016	ITF Redding, US	25k	Hard	(United States) Julia Elbaba	(Bosnia and Herzegovina) Ema Burgić Bucko (United States) Sabrina Santamaria	3–6, 6–7^{(4)}
Win	7–7	Apr 2017	ITF Pula, Italy	25k	Clay	(North Macedonia) Lina Gjorcheska	(India) Prarthana Thombare (Netherlands) Eva Wacanno	6–2, 6–3
Win	8–7	Apr 2017	ITF Pula, Italy	25k	Clay	(Spain) Georgina García Pérez	(Italy) Cristiana Ferrando (Italy) Camilla Rosatello	6–4, 6–3

== Head-to-head records ==
=== Record against top 10 players ===
Pera's record against players who have been ranked in the top 10. Active players are in boldface.

Player	Record	Win%	Hard	Clay	Grass	Last match
**No. 1 ranked players**						
**(Germany) Angelique Kerber**	1–0	100%	1–0	–	–	Won (6–0, 6–4) at 2021 Australian Open
**(Spain) Garbiñe Muguruza**	0–1	0%	–	0–1	–	Lost (6–2, 0–6, 5–7) at 2021 Rome
(United States) Serena Williams	0–1	0%	0–1	–	–	Lost (6–4, 4–6, 1–6) at 2020 Lexington
**(Poland) Iga Świątek**	0–2	0%	–	0–1	0–1	Lost (3–6, 2–6) at 2023 Madrid Open
(Australia) Ashleigh Barty	0–1	0%	–	0–1	–	Lost (4–6, 6–3, 2–6) at 2021 French Open
**(Japan) Naomi Osaka**	0–1	0%	0–1	–	–	Lost (2–6, 6–7) at 2018 Washington
**(Czech Republic) Karolína Plíšková**	0–2	0%	0–1	0–1	–	Lost (3–6, 6–1, 1–6) at 2022 Strasbourg
No. 2 ranked players						
**(Czech Republic) Barbora Krejčíková**	1–0	100%	1–0	–	–	Won (6–4, 6–1) at 2022 Cleveland
**(Tunisia) Ons Jabeur**	1–1	50%	1–0	0–1	–	Won (6–4, 6–3) at 2019 Guangzhou
**(Estonia) Anett Kontaveit**	1–1	50%	–	1–0	0–1	Won (6–2, 6–4) at 2022 Hamburg
**(Belarus) Aryna Sabalenka**	1–2	33%	0–1	1–0	0–1	Lost (3–6, 4–6) at 2021 Eastbourne
**(Russia) Svetlana Kuznetsova**	0–1	0%	–	0–1	–	Lost (6–3, 6–7, 3–6) at 2020 Rome
**(Russia) Vera Zvonareva**	0–1	0%	0–1	–	–	Lost (7–5, 3–6, 4–6) at 2018 Indian Wells
**(Spain) Paula Badosa**	0–1	0%	–	0–1	–	Lost (6–7, 3–6) at 2013 ITF Vallduxo
**(Czech Republic) Petra Kvitová**	0–2	0%	0–2	–	–	Lost (3–6, 5–7) at 2022 Guadalajara
No. 3 ranked players						
**(United States) Jessica Pegula**	0–1	0%	0–1	–	–	Lost (4–6, 4–6) at 2022 Australian Open
**(Ukraine) Elina Svitolina**	0–1	0%	–	0–1	–	Lost (1–6, 6–3, 4–6) at 2013 Prague Open
**(Greece) Maria Sakkari**	0–2	0%	0–1	–	0–1	Lost (6–2, 3–6, 2–6) at 2020 US Open
No. 4 ranked players						
**(France) Caroline Garcia**	2–0	100%	1–0	1–0	–	Won (6–3, 6–1) at 2020 Doha
**(United States) Sofia Kenin**	1–0	100%	1–0	–	–	Won (6–2, 5–7, 6–3) at 2022 Cleveland
(United Kingdom) Johanna Konta	2–2	50%	1–2	1–0	–	Lost (2–6, 3–6) at 2021 Melbourne
**(Canada) Bianca Andreescu**	1–1	50%	–	1–1	–	Won (6–2, 6–0) at 2017 ITF Pula
(Australia) Samantha Stosur	0–1	0%	0–1	–	–	Lost (4–6, 6–1, 6–7) at 2019 Guangzhou
**(Switzerland) Belinda Bencic**	0–1	0%	–	0–1	–	Lost (6–3, 1–6, 6–7) at 2021 Madrid Open
(Netherlands) Kiki Bertens	0–2	0%	0–2	–	–	Lost (6–3, 4–6, 2–6) at 2019 Wuhan Open
**(United States) Coco Gauff**	0–1	0%	0–1	–	–	Lost (3–6, 2–6) at 2023 Australian Open
No. 5 ranked players						
**(Latvia) Jeļena Ostapenko**	1–0	100%	–	1–0	–	Won (6–2, 6–1) at 2019 Jurmala
**(Italy) Sara Errani**	1–1	50%	0–1	1–0	–	Won (6–3, 2–6, 6–4) at 2018 Charleston
No. 6 ranked players						
(Spain) Carla Suárez Navarro	0–1	0%	–	0–1	–	Lost (6–2, 2–6, 4–6) at 2018 Madrid Open
No. 7 ranked players						
**(Kazakhstan) Elena Rybakina**	1–1	50%	0–1	1–0	–	Lost (3–6, 2–6) at 2020 Australian Open
**(United States) Madison Keys**	0–3	0%	0–2	0–1	–	Lost (3–6, 4–6) at 2018 Beijing Open
No. 8 ranked players						
**Daria Kasatkina**	0–1	0%	–	0–1	–	Lost (3–6, 6–7^{(3–7)}) at 2023 Charleston
No. 9 ranked players						
**(United States) CoCo Vandeweghe**	1–1	50%	1–1	–	–	Lost (3–6, 7–5, 4–6) at 2022 Concord Open
**(Russia) Veronika Kudermetova**	2–3	40%	2–1	0–1	0–1	Lost (4–6, 6–3, 6–7^{(4–7)}) at 2021 Istanbul
**Total**	**17–40**	**30%**	**9–20 (31%)**	**8–15 (35%)**	**0–5 (0%)**	**current as of 30 April 2023**

=== Top 10 wins ===
No.	Player	Rank	Event	Surface	Rd	Score
**2018**
1.	(United Kingdom) Johanna Konta	No. 10	Australian Open, Australia	Hard	2R	6–4, 7–5
**2022**
2.	(Estonia) Anett Kontaveit	No. 2	Hamburg Open, Germany	Clay	F	6–2, 6–4

== Longest winning streak ==
=== 16-match win streak (2022) ===
#	Tournament	Category	Date	Surface	Rd	Opponent	Rank	Score
–	Grand Est Open 88	WTA 125	5 July 2022	Clay	1R	(Italy) Jasmine Paolini (3)	No. 72	6–0, 2–6, 1–6
1	Budapest Grand Prix	WTA 250	9 July 2022	Clay	Q1	(Ukraine) Katarina Zavatska	No. 284	6–1, 6–1
2	Budapest Grand Prix	WTA 250	10 July 2022	Clay	Q2	(Georgia (country)) Sofia Shapatava	No. 356	6–1, 6–2
3	Budapest Grand Prix	WTA 250	11 July 2022	Clay	1R	(Spain) Marina Bassols Ribera (LL)	No. 226	6–2, 7–5
4	Budapest Grand Prix	WTA 250	13 July 2022	Clay	2R	Aliaksandra Sasnovich (5)	No. 36	7–5, 6–2
5	Budapest Grand Prix	WTA 250	15 July 2022	Clay	QF	(Italy) Elisabetta Cocciaretto	No. 118	6–4, 6–3
6	Budapest Grand Prix	WTA 250	16 July 2022	Clay	SF	(Hungary) Anna Bondár (9)	No. 53	6–3, 6–4
7	Budapest Grand Prix	WTA 250	17 July 2022	Clay	F	(Serbia) Aleksandra Krunić	No. 105	6–3, 6–3
8	Hamburg European Open	WTA 250	19 July 2022	Clay	1R	(Romania) Elena-Gabriela Ruse (9)	No. 69	6–0, 6–4
9	Hamburg European Open	WTA 250	20 July 2022	Clay	2R	(Switzerland) Joanne Züger (Q)	No. 165	6–1, 6–1
10	Hamburg European Open	WTA 250	21 July 2022	Clay	QF	(Czech Republic) Kateřina Siniaková	No. 96	6–3, 6–1
11	Hamburg European Open	WTA 250	22 July 2022	Clay	SF	(Belgium) Maryna Zanevska (7)	No. 72	6–2, 6–4
12	Hamburg European Open	WTA 250	23 July 2022	Clay	F	(Estonia) Anett Kontaveit (1)	No. 2	6–2, 6–4
13	Thoreau Tennis Open	WTA 125	9 August 2022	Hard	1R	(United States) Kayla Day (Q)	No. 213	6–4, 7–5
14	Thoreau Tennis Open	WTA 125	10 August 2022	Hard	2R	Anna Blinkova	No. 155	2–6, 7–6^{(8–6)}, 6–3
15	Thoreau Tennis Open	WTA 125	12 August 2022	Hard	QF	(United States) Katie Volynets	No. 119	6–3, 6–1
16	Thoreau Tennis Open	WTA 125	13 August 2022	Hard	SF	(United States) Katrina Scott (Q)	No. 241	6–4, 6–2
–	Thoreau Tennis Open	WTA 125	14 August 2022	Hard	F	(United States) CoCo Vandeweghe (WC)	No. 192	3–6, 7–5, 4–6
