= Thoreau Tennis Open =

- 2022 Thoreau Tennis Open

Defunct tennis tournament
- Event name: Thoreau Tennis Open
- Location: Concord, Massachusetts, United States
- Venue: The Thoreau Club
- Category: WTA 125
- Surface: Hard
- Draw: 32S/16Q/14D
- Prize money: $115,000
- Website: www.thoreautennisopen.com

Current champions (2022)
- Singles: (United States) CoCo Vandeweghe
- Doubles: Varvara Flink (United States) CoCo Vandeweghe

The Thoreau Tennis Open was a tournament for professional female tennis players played on outdoor hardcourts. The event was classified as a WTA 125 tournament and was held in Concord, Massachusetts, United States, from 2019 to 2022.

== Past finals ==
=== Singles ===
Year	Champion	Runner-up	Score
2022	(United States) CoCo Vandeweghe	(United States) Bernarda Pera	6–3, 5–7, 6–4
2021	(Poland) Magdalena Fręch	(Mexico) Renata Zarazúa	6–3, 7–6^{(7–4)}
⬆️ WTA $125,000 event ⬆️
2020	Tournament cancelled due to the COVID-19 pandemic		
2019	(United States) Caroline Dolehide	(United States) Ann Li	6–3, 7–5

=== Doubles ===
Year	Champions	Runners-up	Score
2022	Varvara Flink (United States) CoCo Vandeweghe	(Thailand) Peangtarn Plipuech (Japan) Moyuka Uchijima	6–3, 7–6^{(7–3)}
2021	(Thailand) Peangtarn Plipuech (Indonesia) Jessy Rompies	(United States) Usue Maitane Arconada (Spain) Cristina Bucșa	3–6, 7–6^{(7–5)}, [10–8]
⬆️ WTA $125,000 event ⬆️
2020	Tournament cancelled due to the COVID-19 pandemic		
2019	(United States) Angela Kulikov (United States) Rianna Valdes	(United States) Elizabeth Halbauer (United States) Ingrid Neel	7–6^{(7–3)}, 4–6, [17–15]
