= Angela Kulikov =

American tennis player

- Full name: Angela Kirsten Kulikov
- Country (sports): United States
- Born: 31 March 1998 (age 28) Los Angeles, California, US
- Height: 1.70 m (5 ft 7 in)
- College: USC
- Prize money: $127,526

Singles
- Career record: 10–11

Doubles
- Career record: 93–56
- Career titles: 1 WTA, 10 ITF
- Highest ranking: No. 57 (October 24, 2022)

Grand Slam doubles results
- Australian Open: 1R (2023)
- French Open: 1R (2023)
- Wimbledon: 1R (2023)
- US Open: 2R (2022)
- Last updated on: August 28, 2026.

Angela Kirsten Kulikov (born 31 March 1998) is an inactive American tennis player who specializes in doubles. She has a career-high doubles ranking of world No. 57, achieved on 24 October 2022.

Kulikov has played college tennis at the University of Southern California (USC).

== Career ==
Kulikov won her first ITF Circuit title at the 2019 Thoreau Tennis Open, in the doubles draw, partnering Rianna Valdes.

She won her first WTA Tour title at the 2022 Hamburg European Open, partnering Sophie Chang.

== WTA Tour finals ==
=== Doubles: 3 (1 title, 2 runner-ups) ===
Legend
WTA 1000
WTA 500
WTA 250 (1–2)

Result	W–L	Date	Tournament	Tier	Surface	Partner	Opponents	Score
Win	1–0	Jul 2022	Hamburg Open, Germany	WTA 250	Clay	(United States) Sophie Chang	(Japan) Miyu Kato (Indonesia) Aldila Sutjiadi	6–3, 4–6, [10–6]
Loss	1–1	Oct 2022	Jasmin Open, Tunisia	WTA 250	Hard	(Japan) Miyu Kato	(France) Kristina Mladenovic (Czech Republic) Kateřina Siniaková	2–6, 0–6
Loss	1–2	Jul 2023	Hamburg Open, Germany	WTA 250	Clay	(Czech Republic) Miriam Kolodziejová	(Kazakhstan) Anna Danilina; Alexandra Panova	4–6, 2–6

== WTA 125 finals ==
=== Doubles: 1 (runner-up) ===
Result	W–L	Date	Tournament	Surface	Partner	Opponents	Score
Loss	0–1	Aug 2022	Vancouver Open, Canada	Hard	(Hungary) Tímea Babos	(Japan) Miyu Kato (United States) Asia Muhammad	3–6, 5–7

== ITF Circuit finals ==
=== Doubles: 15 (10 titles, 5 runner-ups) ===
Legend W100 tournaments (2–2) W60/75 tournaments (7–2) W25/35 tournaments (1–0) W15 tournaments (0–1)	Finals by surface Hard (7–2) Clay (3–3)

Result	W–L	Date	Tournament	Tier	Surface	Partner	Opponents	Score
Loss	0–1	Jul 2019	ITF Cancún, Mexico	W15	Hard	(United States) Rianna Valdes	(Brazil) Ingrid Martins (Brazil) Eduarda Piai	7–6^{(1)}, 5–7, [9–11]
Win	1–1	Aug 2019	Concord Open, United States	W60	Hard	(United States) Rianna Valdes	(United States) Elizabeth Halbauer (United States) Ingrid Neel	7–6^{(3)}, 4–6, [17–15]
Win	2–1	Oct 2021	Berkeley Challenge, US	W60	Hard	(United States) Sophie Chang	(Chinese Taipei) Liang En-shuo (China) Lu Jiajing	6–4, 6–3
Loss	2–2	Jan 2022	ITF Orlando Pro, US	W60	Hard	(United States) Rianna Valdes	(United States) Hailey Baptiste (United States) Whitney Osuigwe	6–7^{(7)}, 5–7
Win	3–2	Feb 2022	Georgia's Rome Open, US	W60	Hard (i)	(United States) Sophie Chang	(United States) Emina Bektas (United Kingdom) Tara Moore	6–3, 6–7^{(2)}, [10–7]
Win	4–2	Apr 2022	Clay Court Championships, US	W100	Clay	(United States) Sophie Chang	(Italy) Lucrezia Stefanini (Romania) Irina Bara	6–4, 3–6, [10–8]
Win	5–2	Apr 2022	Charlottesville Open, US	W60	Clay	(United States) Sophie Chang	(United States) Alycia Parks (Greece) Valentini Grammatikopoulou	2–6, 6–3, [10–4]
Loss	5–3	May 2022	ITF Charleston Pro, US	W100	Clay	(United States) Sophie Chang	(Poland) Katarzyna Kawa (Indonesia) Aldila Sutjiadi	1–6, 4–6
Win	6–3	May 2022	ITF Orlando Pro, US	W60	Hard	(United States) Sophie Chang	(United States) Hanna Chang (United States) Elizabeth Mandlik	6–3, 2–6, [10–6]
Win	7–3	Apr 2023	ITF Charleston Pro, US	W100	Clay	(United States) Sophie Chang	(United States) Ashlyn Krueger (United States) Robin Montgomery	6–3, 6–4
Loss	7–4	May 2023	ITF Naples, US	W60	Clay	(United States) Sophie Chang	(United States) Christina Rosca (Australia) Astra Sharma	1–6, 6–7^{(13)}
Win	8–4	Jan 2024	ITF Arcadia, US	W35	Hard	(United States) Ashley Lahey	(United States) Haley Giavara (United States) Brandy Walker	6–3, 6–2
Win	9–4	Jan 2024	Georgia's Rome Open, US	W75	Hard (i)	(United States) Jamie Loeb	(United States) Hailey Baptiste (United States) Whitney Osuigwe	walkover
Win	10–4	Jan 2025	Georgia's Rome Open, US	W75	Hard (i)	(United States) Sophie Chang	(United States) Whitney Osuigwe (Netherlands) Eva Vedder	7–6^{(3)}, 6–4
Loss	10–5	Apr 2025	Bonita Springs Championship, US	W100	Clay	(United States) Makenna Jones	Maria Kozyreva; Iryna Shymanovich	2–6, 2–6
