= Rianna Valdes =

American tennis player (born 1996)

- Full name: Rianna Tei Valdes
- Country (sports): United States
- Born: 3 September 1996 (age 28); Orlando, United States
- Height: 1.70 m (5 ft 7 in)
- Plays: Right-handed
- College: USC
- Prize money: US$ 15,113

Singles
- Career record: 41–37
- Highest ranking: No. 498 (11 May 2015)

Doubles
- Career record: 37–31
- Career titles: 1 ITF
- Highest ranking: No. 328 (28 July 2022)

Rianna Tei Valdes (born 3 September 1996) is an American pickleball player and former tennis player.

Valdes has a career-high WTA singles ranking of 498, achieved on 11 May 2015. She also holds a career-high WTA doubles ranking of 328, set on 28 July 2022.

Valdes won her first and sole ITF title at the 2019 Thoreau Tennis Open, in the doubles draw partnering Angela Kulikov.

She played college tennis at the University of Southern California.

== ITF finals ==
=== Doubles: 3 (1 title, 2 runner-ups) ===
Legend
$60,000 tournaments
$25,000 tournaments
$15,000 tournaments

Result	W–L	Date	Tournament	Tier	Surface	Partner	Opponents	Score
Loss	0–1	Jul 2019	ITF Cancún, Mexico	15,000	Hard	(United States) Angela Kulikov	(Brazil) Ingrid Martins (Brazil) Eduarda Piai	7–6^{(1)}, 5–7, [9–11]
Win	1–1	Aug 2019	Concord Open, U.S.	60,000	Hard	(United States) Angela Kulikov	(United States) Elizabeth Halbauer (United States) Ingrid Neel	7–6^{(3)}, 4–6, [17–15]
Loss	1–2	Jan 2022	ITF Orlando Pro, U.S.	60,000	Hard	(United States) Angela Kulikov	(United States) Hailey Baptiste (United States) Whitney Osuigwe	6–7^{(7)}, 5–7
