= Peangtarn Plipuech =

Thai tennis player (born 1992)

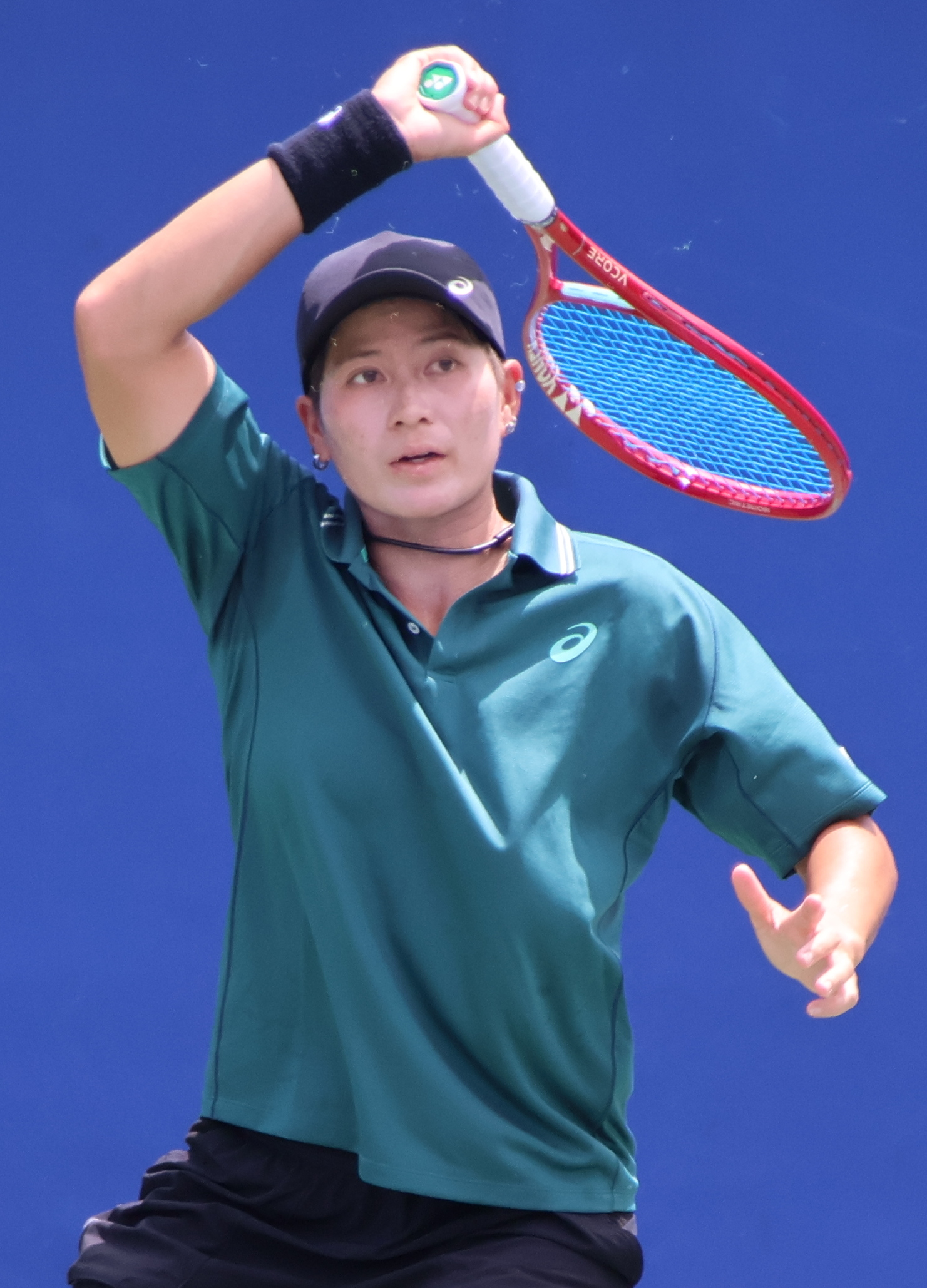
- Plipuech in 2026
- Native name: เพียงธาร ผลิพืช
- Country (sports): Thailand
- Born: 15 November 1992 (age 34) Nonthaburi, Thailand
- Height: 1.69 m (5 ft 7 in)
- Turned pro: 2009
- Plays: Right (two-handed backhand)
- Prize money: $443,249

Singles
- Career record: 392–345
- Career titles: 7 ITF
- Highest ranking: No. 175 (31 July 2017)
- Current ranking: No. 705 (14 September 2026)

Doubles
- Career record: 451–335
- Career titles: 3 WTA 125, 38 ITF
- Highest ranking: No. 95 (7 October 2024)
- Current ranking: No. 138 (14 September 2026)

Grand Slam doubles results
- Australian Open: 1R (2022, 2025)
- Wimbledon: 1R (2022)

Team competitions
- Fed Cup: 10–18
Medal record
Tennis
Representing Thailand
Southeast Asian Games
Gold medal – first place	2017 Kuala Lumpur	Doubles
Gold medal – first place	2023 Phnom Penh	Doubles
Silver medal – second place	2015 Singapore	Mixed doubles
Silver medal – second place	2019 Philippines	Doubles
Silver medal – second place	2023 Cambodia	Team
Silver medal – second place	2023 Cambodia	Mixed doubles
Bronze medal – third place	2015 Singapore	Doubles
Bronze medal – third place	2017 Kuala Lumpur	Mixed doubles
- Last updated on: 19 September 2026.

Peangtarn "Earth" Plipuech (Thai: เพียงธาร ผลิพืช, RTGS: Phiangthan Phliphuet; born 15 November 1992) is a Thai tennis player. She has a career-high singles ranking by the WTA of 175, achieved on 31 July 2017. On 7 October 2024, she peaked at No. 95 in WTA doubles ranking.

Plipuech has won three doubles titles on the WTA Challenger Tour, along with seven singles and 38 doubles titles on the ITF Women's Circuit.

== Career ==
Her biggest title to date was at the 2013 Lexington Challenger where she and Nicha Lertpitaksinchai claimed the doubles title.

In 2016 and 2017, she reached the finals in doubles of the WTA Tour tournament in Seoul.

In 2023, she reached the semifinals at the home tournament in Hua Hin, Thailand as a wildcard with partner compatriot Luksika Kumkhum, after the withdrawal of Anna Kalinskaya and Linda Fruhvirtová. At the Korea Open she reached her third final in doubles, six years after her second final at the same tournament, also with Kumkhum, but lost to Marie Bouzková and Bethanie Mattek-Sands.

== Personal life ==
Plipuech's sister Plobrung is a junior tennis player.

== Grand Slam performance timeline ==
Key
W	F	SF	QF	#R	RR	Q#	DNQ	A	NH

(W) winner; (F) finalist; (SF) semifinalist; (QF) quarterfinalist; (#R) rounds 4, 3, 2, 1; (RR) round-robin stage; (Q#) qualification round; (DNQ) did not qualify; (A) absent; (NH) not held; (SR) strike rate (events won / competed); (W–L) win–loss record.
To avoid confusion and double counting, these charts are updated at the conclusion of a tournament or when the player's participation has ended.

=== Doubles ===
Tournament	2022	...	2025	SR	W–L
Australian Open	1R		1R	0 / 2	0–2
French Open	A		A	0 / 0	0–0
Wimbledon	1R		A	0 / 1	0–1
US Open	A		A	0 / 0	0–0
Win-loss	0–2		0–1	0 / 3	0–3

== WTA Tour finals ==
=== Doubles: 5 (5 runner-ups) ===
Legend WTA 500 (0–1) WTA 250 (0–4)	Finals by surface Hard (0–5)

Result	W–L	Date	Tournament	Tier	Surface	Partner	Opponents	Score
Loss	0–1	Sep 2016	Korea Open, South Korea	International	Hard	(Japan) Akiko Omae	(Belgium) Kirsten Flipkens (Sweden) Johanna Larsson	2–6, 3–6
Loss	0–2	Sep 2017	Korea Open	International	Hard	(Thailand) Luksika Kumkhum	(Netherlands) Kiki Bertens (Sweden) Johanna Larsson	4–6, 1–6
Loss	0–2	Sep 2023	Korea Open	WTA 250	Hard	(Thailand) Luksika Kumkhum	(Czech Republic) Marie Bouzková (United States) Bethanie Mattek-Sands	2–6, 1–6
Loss	0–4	Nov 2025	Hong Kong Open, China SAR	WTA 250	Hard	(Japan) Momoko Kobori	(China) Jiang Xinyu (China) Wang Yafan	4–6, 2–6
Loss	0–5	Sep 2026	Guadalajara Open, Mexico	WTA 500	Hard	(Japan) Momoko Kobori	(Spain) Cristina Bucșa (United States) Nicole Melichar-Martinez	2–6, 7–5, [5–10]

== WTA 125 finals ==
=== Doubles: 7 (3 titles, 4 runner-ups) ===
Result	W–L	Date	Tournament	Surface	Partner	Opponents	Score
Win	1–0	Aug 2021	Concord Open, United States	Hard	(Indonesia) Jessy Rompies	(United States) Usue Maitane Arconada (Spain) Cristina Bucșa	3–6, 7–6^{(5)}, [10–8]
Win	2–0	Aug 2021	Chicago Challenger, US	Hard	(Japan) Eri Hozumi	(Germany) Mona Barthel (Chinese Taipei) Hsieh Yu-chieh	7–5, 6–2
Loss	2–1	Nov 2021	Midland Tennis Classic, US	Hard (i)	(Indonesia) Aldila Sutjiadi	(United Kingdom) Harriet Dart (United States) Asia Muhammad	3–6, 6–2, [7–10]
Loss	2–2	Aug 2022	Concord Open, US	Hard	(Japan) Moyuka Uchijima	Varvara Flink (United States) CoCo Vandeweghe	3–6, 6–7^{(3)}
Win	3–2	Jul 2024	Båstad Open, Sweden	Clay	(Chinese Taipei) Tsao Chia-yi	(Argentina) María Lourdes Carlé (Argentina) Julia Riera	7–5, 6–3
Loss	3–3	Jul 2025	Porto Open, Portugal	Hard	(Chinese Taipei) Liang En-shuo	(United States) Carmen Corley (United States) Ivana Corley	3–6, 1–6
Loss	3–4	Mar 2026	Antalya Challenger, Turkey	Clay	(Japan) Momoko Kobori	Iryna Shymanovich; Maria Kozyreva	5–7, 1–6

== ITF Circuit finals ==
=== Singles: 17 (7 titles, 10 runner-ups) ===
Legend W25/35 tournaments W10/15 tournaments	Finals by surface Hard (7–9) Clay (0–1)

Result	W–L	Date	Tournament	Tier	Surface	Opponent	Score
Loss	0–1	May 2011	ITF Bangkok, Thailand	10,000	Hard	(Thailand) Luksika Kumkhum	1–6, 0–6
Win	1–1	Nov 2011	ITF Manila, Philippines	10,000	Hard	(China) Lu Jiaxiang	6–3, 6–3
Loss	1–2	Mar 2012	ITF Aurangabad, India	10,000	Clay	(Slovenia) Dalila Jakupović	4–6, 5–7
Win	2–2	Jun 2013	ITF Bangkok, Thailand	10,000	Hard	(Thailand) Nungnadda Wannasuk	6–0, 6–1
Win	3–2	Aug 2014	ITF New Delhi, India	10,000	Hard	(India) Natasha Palha	6–2, 6–4
Loss	3–3	May 2015	ITF Bangkok, Thailand	10,000	Hard	(Thailand) Nicha Lertpitaksinchai	6–7^{(4)}, 2–6
Loss	3–4	Jun 2016	ITF Kaohsiung, Taiwan	10,000	Hard	(Chinese Taipei) Lee Hua-chen	7–6^{(4)}, 0–6, 0–6
Win	4–4	Aug 2016	ITF Tsukuba, Japan	25,000	Hard	(Belgium) Greet Minnen	6–4, 6–0
Win	5–4	May 2017	ITF Hua Hin, Thailand	25,000	Hard	(United States) Jacqueline Cako	6–4, 6–2
Win	6–4	May 2017	ITF Goyang, South Korea	25,000	Hard	(Japan) Mari Osaka	7–6^{(7)}, 6–0
Loss	6–5	Jun 2017	ITF Tokyo, Japan	25,000	Hard	(Australia) Tammi Patterson	3–6, 2–6
Loss	6–6	May 2019	ITF Nonthaburi, Thailand	W25	Hard	(Australia) Maddison Inglis	0–6, 2–6
Loss	6–7	Apr 2022	ITF Chiang Rai, Thailand	W25	Hard	(Thailand) Luksika Kumkhum	3–6, 3–6
Loss	6–8	Jun 2022	ITF Chiang Rai, Thailand	W25	Hard	(China) Gao Xinyu	3–6, 3–6
Loss	6–9	Aug 2022	ITF Goyang, South Korea	W25	Hard	(Japan) Kyōka Okamura	6–1, 4–6, 3–6
Win	7–9	Feb 2024	ITF Nakhon, Thailand	W35	Hard	(Romania) Irina Fetecău	2–6, 6–3, 6–2
Loss	7–10	May 2025	ITF Maanshan, China	W15	Hard (İ)	(Indonesia) Priska Madelyn Nugroho	1–6, 2–6

=== Doubles: 71 (39 titles, 32 runner-ups) ===
Legend W100 tournaments W75/80 tournaments W60/75 tournaments W50 tournaments W25/35 tournaments W10/15 tournaments	Finals by surface Hard (35–29) Clay (2–1) Grass (1–1) Carpet (1–1)

Result	W–L	Date	Tournament	Tier	Surface	Partner	Opponents	Score
Loss	0–1	Oct 2010	ITF Jakarta, Indonesia	10,000	Hard	(Indonesia) Laili Rahmawati Ulfa	(Indonesia) Ayu Fani Damayanti (Indonesia) Jessy Rompies	0–6, 0–6
Win	1–1	Oct 2010	ITF Nonthaburi, Thailand	10,000	Hard	(Thailand) Nungnadda Wannasuk	(Chinese Taipei) Chen Yi (Thailand) Varatchaya Wongteanchai	7–5, 6–7^{(4)}, [11–9]
Win	2–1	Nov 2010	ITF Manila, Philippines	10,000	Hard	(Thailand) Luksika Kumkhum	(United States) Ivana King (United States) Yasmin Schnack	6–4, 7–5
Win	3–1	Dec 2010	ITF Mandya, India	10,000	Hard	(Thailand) Nungnadda Wannasuk	(India) Rushmi Chakravarthi (India) Poojashree Venkatesha	6–1, 6–1
Win	4–1	Aug 2011	ITF Taipei, Taiwan	10,000	Hard	(Chinese Taipei) Kao Shao-yuan	(Chinese Taipei) Chan Hao-ching (Chinese Taipei) Chen Yi	6–3, 6–4
Win	5–1	Nov 2011	ITF Manila, Philippines	10,000	Hard	(Thailand) Luksika Kumkhum	(China) Zhao Yijing (China) Zheng Junyi	6–3, 6–0
Loss	5–2	Nov 2011	ITF Manila, Philippines	10,000	Hard	(Thailand) Luksika Kumkhum	(Thailand) Napatsakorn Sankaew (Thailand) Varunya Wongteanchai	1–6, 6–3, [6–10]
Loss	5–3	Mar 2012	ITF Aurangabad, India	10,000	Clay	(Thailand) Varunya Wongteanchai	(Slovenia) Dalila Jakupović (Germany) Sarah-Rebecca Sekulic	1–6, 3–6
Win	6–3	Mar 2012	ITF Mumbai, India	10,000	Hard	(Thailand) Varunya Wongteanchai	(Slovenia) Anja Prislan (India) Kyra Shroff	6–1, 6–2
Loss	6–4	Jun 2012	ITF Goyang, South Korea	25,000	Hard	(Thailand) Nicha Lertpitaksinchai	(China) Liu Wanting (China) Sun Shengnan	7–6^{(1)}, 3–6, [7–10]
Win	7–4	Jul 2012	GB Pro-Series Foxhills, United Kingdom	25,000	Hard	(Thailand) Nicha Lertpitaksinchai	(Spain) Yvonne Cavallé Reimers (United Kingdom) Nicola Slater	6–2, 7–5
Loss	7–5	Aug 2012	ITF Istanbul, Turkey	10,000	Hard	(Thailand) Nicha Lertpitaksinchai	(Japan) Erika Takao (Japan) Remi Tezuka	6–2, 6–7^{(1)}, [3–10]
Loss	7–6	Sep 2012	ITF Rockhampton, Australia	25,000	Hard	(Thailand) Nicha Lertpitaksinchai	(Indonesia) Ayu Fani Damayanti (Indonesia) Lavinia Tananta	7–5, 6–7^{(2)}, [8–10]
Loss	7–7	Oct 2012	ITF Margaret River, Australia	25,000	Hard	(Thailand) Nicha Lertpitaksinchai	(Japan) Miyabi Inoue (Japan) Mai Minokoshi	7–6^{(8)}, 6–7^{(3)}, [12–14]
Win	8–7	Feb 2013	ITF Muzaffarnagar, India	25,000	Grass	(Thailand) Nicha Lertpitaksinchai	(Poland) Justyna Jegiołka (Ukraine) Veronika Kapshay	3–6, 6–4, [10–8]
Win	9–7	Apr 2013	ITF Phuket, Thailand	25,000	Hard	(Thailand) Nicha Lertpitaksinchai	(United Kingdom) Tara Moore (United Kingdom) Melanie South	6–3, 5–7, [11–9]
Win	10–7	May 2013	ITF Phuket, Thailand	25,000	Hard	(Thailand) Nicha Lertpitaksinchai	(Oman) Fatma Al-Nabhani (Chinese Taipei) Lee Ya-hsuan	6–2, 6–4
Win	11–7	Jul 2013	Lexington Challenger, United States	50,000	Hard	(Thailand) Nicha Lertpitaksinchai	(Israel) Julia Glushko (South Africa) Chanel Simmonds	7–6^{(5)}, 6–3
Loss	11–8	Sep 2013	ITF Incheon, South Korea	25,000	Hard	(Thailand) Nicha Lertpitaksinchai	(Japan) Miki Miyamura (Japan) Akiko Omae	4–6, 7–6, [9–11]
Loss	11–9	Oct 2013	ITF Makinohara, Japan	25,000	Grass	(Thailand) Nicha Lertpitaksinchai	(Japan) Eri Hozumi (Japan) Makoto Ninomiya	1–6, 2–6
Loss	11–10	Nov 2013	ITF Phuket, Thailand	15,000	Hard (i)	(Thailand) Varunya Wongteanchai	(China) Lu Jiajing (China) Lu Jiaxiang	4–6, 5–7
Win	12–10	Nov 2013	ITF Phuket, Thailand	15,000	Hard (i)	(Thailand) Nicha Lertpitaksinchai	(China) Lu Jiaxiang (China) Lu Jiajing	3–6, 6–2, [10–8]
Win	13–10	Dec 2013	ITF Pune, India	25,000	Hard	(Thailand) Nicha Lertpitaksinchai	(United Kingdom) Jocelyn Rae (United Kingdom) Anna Smith	7–5, 7–5
Win	14–10	Feb 2014	ITF New Delhi, India	25,000	Hard	(Thailand) Nicha Lertpitaksinchai	(Japan) Erika Sema (Japan) Yurika Sema	7–6^{(5)}, 6–3
Win	15–10	May 2014	ITF Balikpapan, Indonesia	25,000	Hard	(Japan) Michika Ozeki	(Thailand) Varatchaya Wongteanchai (Thailand) Varunya Wongteanchai	6–3, 4–6, [10–7]
Win	16–10	Jul 2014	ITF Phuket, Thailand	25,000	Hard	(Thailand) Nicha Lertpitaksinchai	(South Korea) Han Na-lae (South Korea) Yoo Mi	6–3, 6–7, [11–9]
Loss	16–11	Aug 2014	ITF Tsukuba, Japan	25,000	Hard	(Thailand) Nicha Lertpitaksinchai	(China) Han Xinyun (China) Zhang Kailin	4–6, 4–6
Win	17–11	Oct 2014	ITF Phuket, Thailand	15,000	Hard (i)	(Thailand) Nicha Lertpitaksinchai	(Ukraine) Oleksandra Korashvili (Ukraine) Alyona Sotnikova	7–6^{(0)}, 2–6, [10–4]
Win	18–11	Oct 2014	ITF Phuket, Thailand	15,000	Hard (i)	(Thailand) Nicha Lertpitaksinchai	(Thailand) Kamonwan Buayam (Chinese Taipei) Lee Pei-chi	7–5, 6–3
Loss	18–12	Nov 2014	ITF Mumbai, India	25,000	Hard	(Thailand) Nicha Lertpitaksinchai	(China) Lu Jiajing (India) Ankita Raina	4–6, 6–1, [9–11]
Win	19–12	Apr 2015	ITF Ahmedabad, India	25,000	Hard	(Thailand) Nungnadda Wannasuk	(Japan) Nao Hibino (India) Prarthana Thombare	6–3, 2–6, [12–10]
Win	20–12	Jul 2015	ITF Evansville, United States	10,000	Hard	(Thailand) Nicha Lertpitaksinchai	(United States) Lauren Herring (United States) Kennedy Shaffer	6–2, 6–3
Loss	20–13	Aug 2015	Lexington Challenger, United States	50,000	Hard	(Thailand) Nicha Lertpitaksinchai	(Japan) Nao Hibino (United Kingdom) Emily Webley-Smith	2–6, 2–6
Loss	20–14	Aug 2015	ITF Tsukuba, Japan	25,000	Hard	(Thailand) Nicha Lertpitaksinchai	(Chinese Taipei) Lee Ya-hsuan (Japan) Makoto Ninomiya	7–6^{(4)}, 6–7^{(2)}, [6–10]
Win	21–14	Sep 2015	ITF Bangkok, Thailand	15,000	Hard	(South Korea) Choi Ji-hee	(Chinese Taipei) Hsu Ching-wen (Finland) Emma Laine	7–5, 6–3
Win	22–14	Oct 2015	ITF Bangkok, Thailand	15,000	Hard	(Thailand) Nudnida Luangnam	(Finland) Emma Laine (Ukraine) Valeriya Strakhova	6–2, 6–3
Loss	22–15	Oct 2015	ITF Bangkok, Thailand	15,000	Hard	(Thailand) Chompoothip Jandakate	(Japan) Ayaka Okuno (Ukraine) Valeriya Strakhova	2–6, 6–7^{(2)}
Win	23–15	Nov 2015	Toyota World Challenge, Japan	75,000	Carpet (i)	(Japan) Akiko Omae	(Thailand) Luksika Kumkhum (Japan) Yuuki Tanaka	3–6, 6–0, [11–9]
Loss	23–16	Dec 2015	ITF Bangkok, Thailand	25,000	Hard	(South Korea) Choi Ji-hee	(Russia) Irina Khromacheva (Russia) Valeria Solovyeva	3–6, 6–4, [5–10]
Win	24–16	Jul 2016	ITF Qujing, China	25,000	Hard	(Japan) Akiko Omae	(China) Jiang Xinyu (China) Tang Qianhui	6–3, 6–3
Loss	24–17	Apr 2017	ITF Kashiwa, Japan	25,000	Hard	(South Korea) Han Na-lae	(South Korea) Jang Su-jeong (Chinese Taipei) Lee Ya-hsuan	3–6, 6–3, [4–10]
Win	25–17	May 2017	ITF Goyang, South Korea	25,000	Hard	(Thailand) Nicha Lertpitaksinchai	(Australia) Genevieve Lorbergs (Australia) Olivia Tjandramulia	7–5, 6–4
Loss	25–18	Nov 2017	Toyota World Challenge	60,000	Carpet (i)	(Thailand) Nicha Lertpitaksinchai	(Russia) Ksenia Lykina (Japan) Junri Namigata	6–3, 3–6, [4–10]
Loss	25–19	Apr 2018	ITF Osaka, Japan	25,000	Hard	(Japan) Akiko Omae	(South Korea) Choi Ji-hee (Thailand) Nicha Lertpitaksinchai	3–6, 4–6
Loss	25–20	Jun 2018	ITF Hua Hin, Thailand	25,000	Hard	(Thailand) Nicha Lertpitaksinchai	(Mexico) Victoria Rodriguez (New Zealand) Erin Routliffe	5–7, 6–3, [6–10]
Loss	25–21	Jul 2018	ITF Nonthaburi, Thailand	25,000	Hard	(China) Guo Hanyu	(Japan) Robu Kajitani (Chinese Taipei) Lee Pei-chi	4–6, 2–6
Loss	25–22	Oct 2018	Suzhou Ladies Open, China	100,000	Hard	(Thailand) Luksika Kumkhum	(Japan) Misaki Doi (Japan) Nao Hibino	2–6, 3–6
Loss	25–23	May 2019	Kangaroo Cup, Japan	W80	Hard	(Japan) Akiko Omae	(China) Duan Yingying (China) Han Xinyun	3–6, 6–4, [4–10]
Win	26–23	Jul 2019	ITF Ulanqab, China	W25	Hard	(Japan) Kyōka Okamura	(China) Sun Xuliu (China) Wang Meiling	4–6, 7–5, [13–11]
Loss	26–24	Jul 2019	ITF Qujing, China	W25	Hard	(China) Kang Jiaqi	(Japan) Mana Ayukawa (Japan) Erika Sema	2–6, 3–6
Loss	26–25	Jul 2019	ITF Nonthaburi, Thailand	W25	Hard	(Japan) Akiko Omae	(Hong Kong) Eudice Chong (Indonesia) Aldila Sutjiadi	6–7^{(2)}, 4–6
Win	27–25	Apr 2022	ITF Chiang Rai, Thailand	W25	Hard	(Japan) Kyōka Okamura	(China) Ma Yexin (China) Xun Fangying	4–6, 6–3, [10–5]
Win	28–25	Aug 2022	ITF Goyang, South Korea	W25	Hard	(Japan) Kyōka Okamura	(South Korea) Kim Da-bin (Thailand) Punnin Kovapitukted	6–1, 6–0
Win	29–25	Oct 2022	ITF Hua Hin, Thailand	W25	Hard	(Japan) Erika Sema	(Kazakhstan) Gozal Ainitdinova (Russia) Ekaterina Maklakova	2–6, 7–6^{(0)}, [13–11]
Loss	29–26	Mar 2023	ITF Jakarta, Indonesia	W25	Hard	(Thailand) Luksika Kumkhum	(China) Ma Yexin (Japan) Moyuka Uchijima	0–6, 2–6
Win	30–26	Nov 2023	Takasaki Open, Japan	W100	Hard	(Thailand) Luksika Kumkhum	(Chinese Taipei) Liang En-shuo (Chinese Taipei) Wu Fang-hsien	6–3, 6–1
Win	31–26	Feb 2024	ITF Nakhon Si Thammarat, Thailand	W35	Hard	(Japan) Naho Sato	(China) Feng Shuo (China) Zheng Wushuang	6–1, 4–6, [10–7]
Loss	31–27	Mar 2024	Branik Maribor Open, Slovenia	W75	Hard (i)	(Thailand) Luksika Kumkhum	(United Kingdom) Eden Silva; Anastasia Tikhonova	5–7, 3–6
Loss	31–28	May 2024	Jin'an Open, China	W75	Hard	(Thailand) Luksika Kumkhum	(China) Tang Qianhui (China) Zheng Wushuang	1–6, 2–6
Loss	31–29	May 2024	ITF Goyang, South Korea	W50	Hard	(Thailand) Luksika Kumkhum	(Hong Kong) Eudice Chong (Chinese Taipei) Liang En-shuo	5–7, 4–6
Loss	31–30	Jul 2024	ITF Nakhon Si Thammarat, Thailand	W35	Hard	(India) Vaidehi Chaudhari	(Japan) Rinon Okuwaki (South Korea) Jeong Bo-young	6–2, 5–7, [7–10]
Loss	31–31	May 2025	ITF Ma'anshan, China	W15	Hard (i)	(China) Guo Meiqi	(Kazakhstan) Sandugash Kenzhibayeva; Sofya Lansere	3–6, 6–3, [8–10]
Win	32–31	May 2025	ITF Ma'anshan, China	W15	Hard (i)	(China) Wang Jiaqi	Anastasia Grechkina; Kristiana Sidorova	6–3, 3–6, [10–5]
Win	33–31	Jun 2025	ITF Ma'anshan, China	W15	Hard (i)	(China) Wang Jiaqi	(Kazakhstan) Sandugash Kenzhibayeva; Sofya Lansere	6–7^{(6)}, 6–4, [10–4]
Win	34–31	Jul 2025	Internazionali di Cordenons, Italy	W75	Clay	(Chinese Taipei) Liang En-shuo	(Czech Republic) Karolína Kubáňová (Czech Republic) Aneta Laboutková	6–4, 6–2
Win	35–31	Aug 2025	ITF Leipzig, Germany	W50	Clay	(South Korea) Park So-hyun	(Germany) Lola Giza (Bulgaria) Isabella Shinikova	6–1, 6–4
Win	36–31	Aug 2025	ITF Nakhon Pathom, Thailand	W35	Hard	(Thailand) Patcharin Cheapchandej	(Japan) Sakura Hosogi (Japan) Misaki Matsuda	6–3, 6–1
Win	37–31	Sep 2025	ITF Shenyang, China	W35	Hard (i)	(China) Zheng Wushuang	(China) Huang Yujia (China) Xiao Zhenghua	6–3, 6–3
Loss	37–32	Jun 2026	ITF Wuning, China	W100	Hard	(Japan) Hiromi Abe	(Chinese Taipei) Li Yu-yun (China) Zhang Ying	3–6, 2–6
Win	38–32	Aug 2026	ITF Tianjin, China	W15	Hard	(China) Hou Yanan	(Thailand) Kamonwan Yodpetch (China) Zhang Ruien	6–4, 6–2
Win	39–32	Nov 2026	ITF Ma'anshan, China	W15	Hard (i)	(China) Hou Yanan	(South Korea) Im Hee-rae (South Korea) Shin Ji-ho	6–4, 7–5
