= Varvara Flink =

Russian tennis player (born 1986)

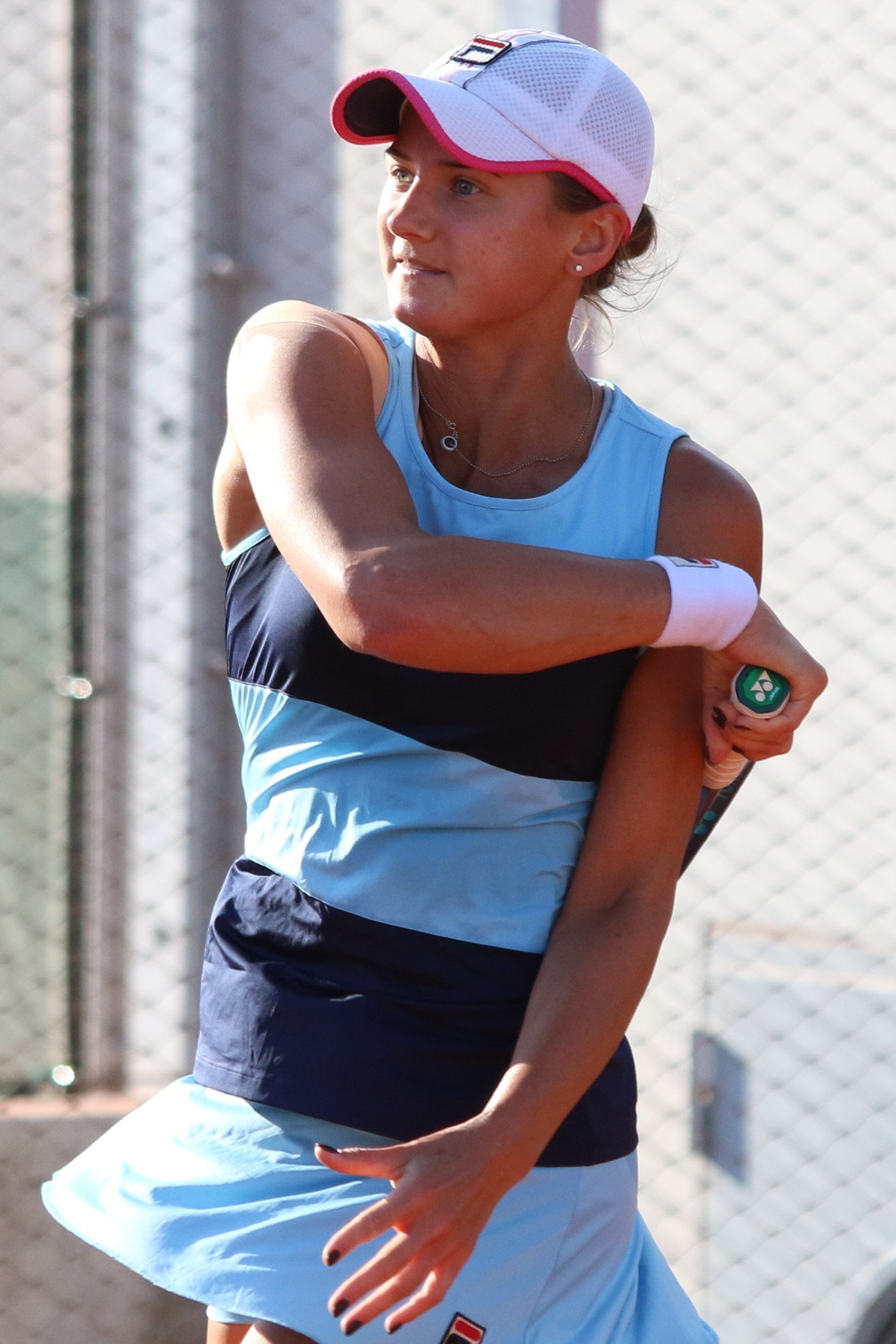
- Flink at the 2022 French Open
- Full name: Varvara Alexandrovna Flink
- Native name: Варвара Александровна Флинк
- Country (sports): Russia
- Born: 13 December 1996 (age 28); Moscow
- Height: 1.75 m (5 ft 9 in)
- Plays: Right (two-handed backhand)
- Prize money: $420,840

Singles
- Career record: 216–132
- Career titles: 6 ITF
- Highest ranking: No. 122 (15 July 2019)

Grand Slam singles results
- Australian Open: Q2 (2019, 2020)
- French Open: Q1 (2019, 2021, 2022)
- Wimbledon: 2R (2019)
- US Open: Q2 (2019, 2022)

Doubles
- Career record: 29–29
- Career titles: 1 WTA Challenger, 2 ITF
- Highest ranking: No. 372 (31 October 2022)

Varvara Alexandrovna Flink (Russian: Варвара Александровна Флинк; born 13 December 1996) is an inactive Russian tennis player.

Flink achieved a career-high WTA singles ranking of 122 on 15 July 2019, and a doubles ranking of 372 on 31 October 2022. She owns one doubles title on the WTA Challenger Tour. Flink won the first of her six ITF singles titles on 21 May 2017. In doubles, she won two ITF titles. The first was in Monastir, Tunisia in 2012. She reached two singles semifinals in 2013, one in Dubrovnik and the other in Seoul.

== Career highlights ==
=== ITF Circuit ===
On the ITF Junior Circuit, Flink achieved a new career-high ranking of world No. 6, following her win at the Grade-A Copa Gerdau in Brazil in March 2013. Later that year, she achieved more success, reaching the final at the Osaka Mayor's Cup and winning the Dunlop Orange Bowl. She ended the year ranked world No. 3 junior, in January 2014, she became world No. 2.

=== WTA Tour ===
Flink made her WTA Tour debut at the 2012 Baku Cup, where she lost in the first round of the singles tournament to Tamarine Tanasugarn from Thailand, in three sets. In doubles, she partnered up with Patricia Mayr-Achleitner to reach the quarterfinals, where they lost to Eva Birnerova and Alberta Brianti, in straight sets.

== Performance timelines ==
Key
W	F	SF	QF	#R	RR	Q#	P#	DNQ	A	Z#	PO	G	S	B	NMS	NTI	P	NH

(W) winner; (F) finalist; (SF) semifinalist; (QF) quarterfinalist; (#R) rounds 4, 3, 2, 1; (RR) round-robin stage; (Q#) qualification round; (P#) preliminary round; (DNQ) did not qualify; (A) absent; (Z#) Davis/Fed Cup Zonal Group (with number indication) or (PO) play-off; (G) gold, (S) silver or (B) bronze Olympic/Paralympic medal; (NMS) not a Masters tournament; (NTI) not a Tier I tournament; (P) postponed; (NH) not held; (SR) strike rate (events won / competed); (W–L) win–loss record.
To avoid confusion and double counting, these charts are updated at the conclusion of a tournament or when the player's participation has ended.

Only main-draw results in WTA Tour, Grand Slam tournaments, Fed Cup/Billie Jean King Cup and Olympic Games are included in win–loss records.

=== Singles ===
Tournament	2014	2015	2016	2017	2018	2019	2020	2021	2022	SR	W–L
Grand Slam tournaments
Australian Open	A	A	A	A	A	Q2	Q2	A	A	0 / 0	0–0
French Open	A	A	A	A	A	Q1	A	Q1	Q1	0 / 0	0–0
Wimbledon	A	A	A	A	A	2R	NH	Q2	A	0 / 1	1–1
US Open	A	A	A	A	A	Q2	A	A	Q2	0 / 0	0–0
Win–loss	0–0	0–0	0–0	0–0	0–0	1–1	0–0	0–0	0–0	0 / 1	1–1
WTA 1000
Miami Open	Q2	A	A	A	A	A	NH	A	A	0 / 0	0–0
Madrid Open	A	A	A	Q1	A	A	NH	A	A	0 / 0	0–0
Cincinnati Open	A	A	1R	A	A	A	A	A	A	0 / 1	0–1
Guadalajara Open	NH								Q1	0 / 0	0–0
Career statistics
Year-end ranking	355	N/A	222	623	189	128	173	472	684	$420,840	

== WTA Challenger finals ==
=== Doubles: 1 (title) ===
Result	W–L	Date	Tournament	Surface	Partner	Opponents	Score
Win	1–0	Aug 2022	Concord Open, United States	Hard	(United States) CoCo Vandeweghe	(Thailand) Peangtarn Plipuech (Japan) Moyuka Uchijima	6–3, 7–6^{(7–3)}

== ITF Circuit finals ==
=== Singles: 11 (6 titles, 5 runner–ups) ===
Legend $50,000 tournaments $25,000 tournaments $10/15,000 tournaments	Finals by surface Hard (1–4) Clay (5–1)

Result	W–L	Date	Tournament	Tier	Surface	Opponent	Score
Loss	0–1	Feb 2016	ITF Sharm El Sheikh, Egypt	10,000	Hard	(Bulgaria) Julia Terziyska	4–6, 3–6
Loss	0–2	Feb 2016	ITF Sharm El Sheikh, Egypt	10,000	Hard	(Slovakia) Tereza Mihalíková	1–6, 4–6
Loss	0–3	Mar 2016	ITF Sharm El Sheikh, Egypt	10,000	Hard	(Slovakia) Viktória Kužmová	6–4, 2–6, 1–6
Loss	0–4	Oct 2016	Abierto Tampico, Mexico	50,000	Hard	(Russia) Sofya Zhuk	4–6, 3–6
Win	1–4	May 2017	ITF Antalya, Turkey	15,000	Clay	(Argentina) María Carlé	6–4, 7–6^{(7–5)}
Loss	1–5	Apr 2018	ITF Antalya, Turkey	15,000	Clay	(Romania) Andreea Roșca	3–6, 4–6
Win	2–5	Apr 2018	ITF Antalya, Turkey	15,000	Clay	(Slovenia) Nina Potočnik	6–4, 6–4
Win	3–5	Apr 2018	ITF Shymkent, Kazakhstan	15,000	Clay	(Kazakhstan) Gozal Ainitdinova	6–4, 6–4
Win	4–5	Apr 2018	ITF Shymkent, Kazakhstan	15,000	Clay	(Russia) Polina Golubovskaya	6–0, 6–3
Win	5–5	Aug 2018	ITF Leipzig, Germany	25,000	Clay	(Austria) Julia Grabher	6–3, 6–2
Win	6–5	Jan 2019	ITF Kazan, Russia	25,000	Hard	(Russia) Anastasia Gasanova	6–2, ret.

=== Doubles: 2 (2 titles) ===
Legend $10,000 tournaments	Finals by surface Hard (2–0)

Result	W–L	Date	Tournament	Tier	Surface	Partner	Opponents	Score
Win	1–0	Nov 2012	ITF Monastir, Tunisia	10,000	Hard	(Netherlands) Jaimy-Gayle van de Wal	(Netherlands) Valeria Podda (Netherlands) Lisanne van Riet	6–3, 6–2
Win	2–0	Oct 2015	ITF Sharm El Sheikh, Egypt	10,000	Hard	(Russia) Veronika Miroshnichenko	(Sweden) Jacqueline Cabaj Awad (Czech Republic) Martina Přádová	6–3, 6–4

== Notes ==
Sporting positions
Preceded by (Croatia) Ana Konjuh	Orange Bowl Girls' Singles Champion; Category: 18 and under 2013	Succeeded by (United States) Sofia Kenin
