= 2025 Makarska Open – Doubles =

Doubles
- 2025 Makarska Open

Final
- Champions: (Czech Republic) Jesika Malečková (Czech Republic) Miriam Škoch
- Runners-up: (Georgia (country)) Oksana Kalashnikova; Elena Pridankina
- Score: 2–6, 6–3, [10–4]

Events
Singles	Doubles
← 2024 ·	Makarska International Championships	· 2026 →

Jesika Malečková and Miriam Škoch won the doubles title at the 2025 Makarska Open, defeating Oksana Kalashnikova and Elena Pridankina in the final, 2–6, 6–3, [10–4].

Sabrina Santamaria and Iryna Shymanovich were the reigning champions, but Santamaria chose not to compete this year and Shymanovich chose to compete in Bari instead.

== Seeds ==
1. (Georgia (country)) Oksana Kalashnikova / Elena Pridankina (final)
2. (Czech Republic) Jesika Malečková / (Czech Republic) Miriam Škoch (champions)

== Draw ==
=== Key ===
- Q = Qualifier
- WC = Wild card
- LL = Lucky loser
- Alt = Alternate
- ITF = ITF entry
- PR = Protected ranking
- SR = Special ranking
- SE = Special exempt
- JE = Junior exempt
- JR = Junior Accelerator Programme entrant
- CO = College Accelerator Programme entrant
- NG = Next Gen Accelerator Program entrant
- w/o = Walkover
- r = Retired
- d = Defaulted

=== Draw ===
Quarterfinals
1	(Georgia (country)) O Kalashnikova; E Pridankina	1	6	[10]
(Andorra) V Jiménez Kasintseva (Australia) T Preston	6	2	[4]
WC	(Croatia) P Marčinko (Croatia) T Würth	6	4	[11]
(United States) J Aney (United States) J Failla	4	6	[13]
Alt	(Germany) T Korpatsch (Romania) PM Țig	6	6
(Netherlands) I Haverlag (United Kingdom) E Silva	0	3
(Netherlands) B Schoofs (Mexico) R Zarazúa	3	7	[5]
2	(Czech Republic) J Malečková (Czech Republic) M Škoch	6	5	[10]

Semifinals
1	(Georgia (country)) O Kalashnikova; E Pridankina	6	6
(United States) J Aney (United States) J Failla	2	3
Alt	(Germany) T Korpatsch (Romania) PM Țig	3	0
2	(Czech Republic) J Malečková (Czech Republic) M Škoch	6	6

Final
1	(Georgia (country)) O Kalashnikova; E Pridankina	6	3	[4]
2	(Czech Republic) J Malečková (Czech Republic) M Škoch	2	6	[10]
