= 2024 Makarska International Championships =

- Date: 4–9 June
- Edition: 18th
- Category: WTA 125
- Prize money: $115,000
- Surface: Clay
- Location: Makarska, Croatia
- Venue: Tennis Center Makarska

Champions

Singles
- (United States) Katie Volynets

Doubles
- (United States) Sabrina Santamaria / Iryna Shymanovich
← 2023 ·	Makarska International Championships	· 2025 →

The 2024 Makarska International Championships, also known as Makarska Open hosted by Valamar, was a professional women's tennis tournament played on outdoor clay courts. It was the eighteenth edition of the tournament and part of the 2024 WTA 125 tournaments. The event took place from 4 to 9 June 2024 at the Tennis Center in Makarska, Croatia.

== Singles main draw entrants ==
=== Seeds ===
Country	Player	Rank^{1}	Seed
ESP	Sara Sorribes Tormo	43	1
EGY	Mayar Sherif	53	2
SVK	Anna Karolína Schmiedlová	54	3
CHN	Wang Xiyu	61	4
CRO	Petra Martić	81	5
CZE	Brenda Fruhvirtová	89	6
JPN	Nao Hibino	96	7
USA	Katie Volynets	108	8

- ^{1} Rankings as of 27 May 2024.

=== Other entrants ===
The following players received a wildcard into the singles main draw:

- (Croatia) Tena Lukas
- (Croatia) Petra Marčinko
- (Croatia) Petra Martić
- (Spain) Sara Sorribes Tormo

The following players entered the singles main draw through qualification:

- (Australia) Maya Joint
- (Ukraine) Valeriya Strakhova
- (Croatia) Sara Svetac
- Maria Timofeeva

== Doubles entrants ==
=== Seeds ===
Country	Player	Country	Player	Rank^{1}	Seed
UKR	Valeriya Strakhova	TPE	Wu Fang-hsien	164	1
GRE	Valentini Grammatikopoulou	POL	Katarzyna Piter	177	2

- ^{1} Rankings as of 27 May 2024.

=== Other entrants ===
The following pair received a wildcard into the doubles main draw:

- (Croatia) Tena Lukas / (France) Kristina Mladenovic

== Champions ==
=== Singles ===
- (United States) Katie Volynets def. (Egypt) Mayar Sherif, 3–6, 6–2, 6–1

=== Doubles ===
- (United States) Sabrina Santamaria / Iryna Shymanovich def. (Japan) Nao Hibino / (Georgia (country)) Oksana Kalashnikova, 6–4, 3–6, [10–6]
