= 2023 Grand Prix SAR La Princesse Lalla Meryem =

- Date: 21 – 27 May
- Edition: 21st
- Category: WTA 250
- Draw: 32S / 16D
- Prize money: $259,303
- Surface: Clay / outdoor
- Location: Rabat, Morocco
- Venue: Club des Cheminots

Champions

Singles
- (Italy) Lucia Bronzetti

Doubles
- (United States) Sabrina Santamaria / Yana Sizikova
- Morocco Open

The 2023 Grand Prix SAR La Princesse Lalla Meryem was a professional women's tennis tournament played on clay courts. It was the 21st edition of the tournament and part of the WTA 250 category of the 2023 WTA Tour. It took place in Rabat, Morocco, between 21 and 27 May 2023.

== Champions ==
=== Singles ===
- (Italy) Lucia Bronzetti def. (Austria) Julia Grabher 6–4, 5–7, 7–5

=== Doubles ===
- (United States) Sabrina Santamaria / Yana Sizikova def. (Brazil) Ingrid Gamarra Martins / Lidziya Marozava 3–6, 6–1, [10–8]

== Singles main draw entrants ==
=== Seeds ===
| Country | Player | Rank^{1} | Seed |
|---|---|---|---|
| ITA | Martina Trevisan | 18 | 1 |
| USA | Sloane Stephens | 36 | 2 |
| EGY | Mayar Sherif | 43 | 3 |
| USA | Alycia Parks | 49 | 4 |
| CAN | Leylah Fernandez | 50 | 5 |
| KAZ | Yulia Putintseva | 51 | 6 |
| CZE | Linda Fruhvirtová | 55 | 7 |
| GER | Tatjana Maria | 63 | 8 |

- Rankings are as of 8 May 2023.

=== Other entrants ===
The following players received wildcards into the singles main draw:

- (Morocco) Malak El Allami
- (Morocco) Aya El Aouni
- Vera Zvonareva

The following players received entry from the qualifying draw:

- (Hungary) Tímea Babos
- (Croatia) Jana Fett
- Tatiana Prozorova
- Anastasia Tikhonova

The following player received entry as a lucky loser:

- (Spain) Ángela Fita Boluda

=== Withdrawals ===
- (Hungary) Anna Bondár → replaced by (Burundi) Sada Nahimana
- (Italy) Elisabetta Cocciaretto → replaced by (France) Léolia Jeanjean
- (Italy) Sara Errani → replaced by (Argentina) Julia Riera
- (Canada) Rebecca Marino → replaced by (France) Kristina Mladenovic
- (United States) Alison Riske-Amritraj → replaced by (Romania) Gabriela Lee
- (Greece) Maria Sakkari → replaced by (Austria) Julia Grabher
- (Spain) Sara Sorribes Tormo → replaced by (Spain) Ángela Fita Boluda
- (Australia) Ajla Tomljanović → replaced by (Italy) Lucia Bronzetti

== Doubles main draw entrants ==
=== Seeds ===
| Country | Player | Country | Player | Rank^{1} | Seed |
|---|---|---|---|---|---|
| JPN | Miyu Kato | INA | Aldila Sutjiadi | 64 | 1 |
| ROU | Monica Niculescu | JPN | Makoto Ninomiya | 83 | 2 |
| HUN | Tímea Babos | KAZ | Anna Danilina | 97 | 3 |
| NOR | Ulrikke Eikeri | JPN | Eri Hozumi | 110 | 4 |

- ^{1} Rankings as of 8 May 2023.

=== Other entrants ===
The following pairs received wildcards into the doubles main draw:

- (Morocco) Malak El Allami / (Hungary) Luca Udvardy
- (Morocco) Aya El Aouni / (Morocco) Yasmine Kabbaj

The following pair received entry as alternates:

- (Hong Kong) Eudice Chong / (United States) Francesca Di Lorenzo

=== Withdrawals ===
- (Spain) Nuria Párrizas Díaz / Ekaterina Yashina → replaced by (Hong Kong) Eudice Chong / (United States) Francesca Di Lorenzo
