= 2023 Makarska International Championships =

- Date: 6 – 11 June
- Edition: 17th
- Category: WTA 125
- Prize money: $115,000
- Surface: Clay
- Location: Makarska Croatia
- Venue: Tennis Center Makarska

Champions

Singles
- (Egypt) Mayar Sherif

Doubles
- (Estonia) Ingrid Neel / (Chinese Taipei) Wu Fang-hsien
← 2022 ·	Makarska International Championships	· 2024 →

The 2023 Makarska International Championships, also known as Makarska Open hosted by Valamar, was a professional women's tennis tournament played on outdoor clay courts. It was the seventeenth edition of the tournament and part of the 2023 WTA 125 tournaments. The event took place from 6 to 11 June 2023 at the Tennis Center in Makarska, Croatia.

== Singles main draw entrants ==
=== Seeds ===
Country	Player	Rank^{1} Seed	
CZE	Linda Nosková	50	1
ITA	Jasmine Paolini	53	2
EGY	Mayar Sherif	54	3
USA	Peyton Stearns	69	4
FRA	Diane Parry	79	5
UKR	Kateryna Baindl	83	6
SWE	Rebecca Peterson	87	7
HUN	Dalma Gálfi	98	8

- ^{1} Rankings as of 29 May 2023.

=== Other entrants ===
The following players received a wildcard into the singles main draw:

- Kristina Dmitruk
- (Croatia) Tena Lukas
- (Croatia) Petra Marčinko
- (Egypt) Mayar Sherif
- (Hungary) Natália Szabanin

The following players entered the singles main draw through qualification:

- (Romania) Miriam Bulgaru
- (North Macedonia) Lina Gjorcheska
- (Slovakia) Rebecca Šramková
- (Ukraine) Katarina Zavatska

=== Withdrawals ===
?Before the tournament

- (Hungary) Anna Bondár → replaced by Darya Astakhova
- (France) Clara Burel → replaced by (Latvia) Darja Semeņistaja
- (United States) Kayla Day → replaced by (France) Chloe Paquet
- (Montenegro) Danka Kovinić → replaced by (Hungary) Réka Luca Jani
- (Serbia) Aleksandra Krunić → replaced by (Slovenia) Dalila Jakupović
- (United States) Emma Navarro → replaced by (Czech Republic) Sára Bejlek
- (Kazakhstan) Yulia Putintseva → replaced by (France) Kristina Mladenovic
- (Slovakia) Anna Karolína Schmiedlová → replaced by (France) Elsa Jacquemot
- (Germany) Laura Siegemund → replaced by (Germany) Mona Barthel
- (United States) Katie Volynets → replaced by (Japan) Mai Hontama

== Doubles entrants ==
=== Seeds ===
Country	Player	Country	Player Rank^{1}	Seed	
JPN	Makoto Ninomiya		Alexandra Panova	113	1
EST	Ingrid Neel	TPE	Wu Fang-hsien	144	2

- ^{1} Rankings as of 29 May 2023.

=== Other entrants ===
The following pair received a wildcard into the doubles main draw:

- Kristina Dmitruk / (Croatia) Mariana Dražić

== Champions ==
=== Singles ===
- (Egypt) Mayar Sherif def. (Italy) Jasmine Paolini 2–6, 7–6^{(8–6)}, 7–5

=== Doubles ===
- (Estonia) Ingrid Neel / (Chinese Taipei) Wu Fang-hsien def. (Czech Republic) Anna Sisková / (Czech Republic) Renata Voráčová 6–3: 7–5
