= 2025 Makarska Open – Singles =

Singles
- 2025 Makarska Open

Final
- Champion: (Czech Republic) Sára Bejlek
- Runner-up: (Andorra) Victoria Jiménez Kasintseva
- Score: 6–0, 6–1

Events
Singles	Doubles
← 2024 ·	Makarska International Championships	· 2026 →

Sára Bejlek won the singles title at the 2025 Makarska Open, defeating Victoria Jiménez Kasintseva in the final, 6–0, 6–1.

Katie Volynets was the defending champion, but lost in the second round to Mona Barthel.

== Seeds ==
1. (Australia) Maya Joint (semifinals)
2. (United States) Katie Volynets (second round)
3. (Mexico) Renata Zarazúa (second round)
4. (Egypt) Mayar Sherif (quarterfinals)
5. (France) Diane Parry (second round)
6. (Germany) Ella Seidel (first round)
7. (Croatia) Petra Martić (second round)
8. (Latvia) Darja Semeņistaja (quarterfinals)

== Draw ==
=== Key ===
- Q = Qualifier
- WC = Wild card
- LL = Lucky loser
- Alt = Alternate
- ITF = ITF entry
- PR = Protected ranking
- SR = Special ranking
- SE = Special exempt
- JE = Junior exempt
- JR = Junior Accelerator Programme entrant
- CO = College Accelerator Programme entrant
- NG = Next Gen Accelerator Program entrant
- w/o = Walkover
- r = Retired
- d = Defaulted

=== Finals ===
Semifinals
1	(Australia) Maya Joint	6	5	2
(Czech Republic) Sára Bejlek	2	7	6
(Andorra) Victoria Jiménez Kasintseva	6^{2}	7	6
(Serbia) Lola Radivojević	7^{7}	5	4

Final
(Czech Republic) Sára Bejlek	6	6
(Andorra) Victoria Jiménez Kasintseva	0	1

=== Top half ===
First round
1	(Australia) M Joint	6	6
WC	(Croatia) A Konjuh	2	2
(Slovenia) T Zidanšek	3	6^{4}
(United States) L Chirico	6	7^{7}
Q	(Croatia) T Würth	6	6
Q	(Croatia) S Svetac	0	3
(Germany) J Niemeier	2	6	3
8	(Latvia) D Semeņistaja	6	3	6
4/WC	(Egypt) M Sherif	7	6
(Romania) PM Țig	5	2
(Germany) T Korpatsch	3	2
E Pridankina	6	6
(Czech Republic) S Bejlek	2	6	6
(Spain) L Romero Gormaz	6	2	3
Q	(France) M Rouvroy	3	4
7	(Croatia) P Martić	6	6

Second round
1	(Australia) M Joint	6	6
(United States) L Chirico	3	0
Q	(Croatia) T Würth	6^{6}	5
8	(Latvia) D Semeņistaja	7^{8}	7
4/WC	(Egypt) M Sherif	6	6
E Pridankina	1	2
(Czech Republic) S Bejlek	4	6	6
7	(Croatia) P Martić	6	3	4

Quarterfinals
1	(Australia) M Joint	6	6
8	(Latvia) D Semeņistaja	2	2
4/WC	(Egypt) M Sherif	2	4
(Czech Republic) S Bejlek	6	6

Semifinals
1	(Australia) M Joint	6	5	2
(Czech Republic) S Bejlek	2	7	6

=== Bottom half ===
First round
6	(Germany) E Seidel	6	1	4
(Andorra) V Jiménez Kasintseva	4	6	6
E Makarova	2	3
(Belgium) H Vandewinkel	6	6
WC	(Croatia) P Marčinko	6	2
(Romania) M Bulgaru	4	0^{r}
Q	(Ukraine) A Sobolieva	3	6	5
3	(Mexico) R Zarazúa	6	4	7
5	(France) D Parry	6	6
(United States) L Davis	2	4
(Croatia) L Bošković	6	4	1
(Serbia) L Radivojević	3	6	6
(Slovenia) V Erjavec	3	6	6^{5}
(Germany) M Barthel	6	3	7^{7}
WC	(Croatia) T Lukas	2	4
2	(United States) K Volynets	6	6

Second round
(Andorra) V Jiménez Kasintseva	6	6^{4}	6
(Belgium) H Vandewinkel	2	7^{7}	3
WC	(Croatia) P Marčinko	6	6
3	(Mexico) R Zarazúa	4	3
5	(France) D Parry	3	5
(Serbia) L Radivojević	6	7
(Germany) M Barthel	6	6
2	(United States) K Volynets	3	1

Quarterfinals
(Andorra) V Jiménez Kasintseva	6	6
WC	(Croatia) P Marčinko	2	3
(Serbia) L Radivojević	3	7	6
(Germany) M Barthel	6	5	4

Semifinals
(Andorra) V Jiménez Kasintseva	6^{2}	7	6
(Serbia) L Radivojević	7^{7}	5	4

== Qualifying ==
=== Seeds ===
1. (Australia) Taylah Preston (qualifying competition)
2. (France) Margaux Rouvroy (qualified)
3. (Ukraine) Anastasiia Sobolieva (qualified)
4. (Croatia) Tara Würth (qualified)

=== Qualifiers ===
1. (Croatia) Sara Svetac
2. (France) Margaux Rouvroy
3. (Ukraine) Anastasiia Sobolieva
4. (Croatia) Tara Würth

=== Qualifying draw ===
==== First qualifier ====
Qualifying competition
1	(Australia) Taylah Preston	5	4
WC	(Croatia) Sara Svetac	7	6

==== Second qualifier ====
Qualifying competition
2	(France) Margaux Rouvroy	2	6	6
	(France) Émeline Dartron	6	4	2

==== Third qualifier ====
Qualifying competition
3	(Ukraine) Anastasiia Sobolieva	6	6
	(France) Amandine Hesse	3	4

==== Fourth qualifier ====
Qualifying competition
4	(Croatia) Tara Würth	6	6
WC	(United States) Isabel He	0	1
