= 2023 Grand Prix SAR La Princesse Lalla Meryem – Singles =

Singles
- 2023 Grand Prix SAR La Princesse Lalla Meryem

Final
- Champion: (Italy) Lucia Bronzetti
- Runner-up: (Austria) Julia Grabher
- Score: 6–4, 5–7, 7–5

Details
- Draw: 32 (4 Q / 3 WC )
- Seeds: 8

Events
Singles	Doubles
- Morocco Open

Lucia Bronzetti defeated Julia Grabher in the final, 6–4, 5–7, 7–5 to win the singles tennis title at the 2023 Morocco Open. It was her first WTA Tour title.

Martina Trevisan was the defending champion, but retired during her quarterfinal match against Grabher.

== Seeds ==
1. (Italy) Martina Trevisan (quarterfinals, retired)
2. (United States) Sloane Stephens (semifinals)
3. (Egypt) Mayar Sherif (second round)
4. (United States) Alycia Parks (quarterfinals)
5. (Canada) Leylah Fernandez (second round)
6. (Kazakhstan) Yulia Putintseva (quarterfinals)
7. (Czech Republic) Linda Fruhvirtová (first round)
8. (Germany) Tatjana Maria (second round)

== Draw ==
Key

- Q = Qualifier
- WC = Wild card
- LL = Lucky loser
- Alt = Alternate
- ITF = ITF entry
- PR = Protected ranking
- SR = Special ranking
- SE = Special exempt
- JE = Junior exempt
- JR = Junior Accelerator Programme entrant
- CO = College Accelerator Programme entrant
- NG = Next Gen Accelerator Program entrant
- w/o = Walkover
- r = Retired
- d = Defaulted

=== Finals ===
Semifinals
(Austria) Julia Grabher	6	3	7^{8}
(Argentina) Julia Riera	1	6	6^{6}
(Italy) Lucia Bronzetti	6	6
2	(United States) Sloane Stephens	1	1

Final
(Austria) Julia Grabher	4	7	5
(Italy) Lucia Bronzetti	6	5	7

=== Top half ===
First round
1	(Italy) M Trevisan	6	0
(Spain) N Párrizas Díaz	2	0^{r}
(Burundi) S Nahimana	0	4
Q	(Croatia) J Fett	6	6
(Austria) J Grabher	6^{3}	6	6
(Belgium) Y Bonaventure	7^{7}	4	2
(Turkey) Ç Büyükakçay	7	6
7	(Czech Republic) L Fruhvirtová	5	4
3	(Egypt) M Sherif	6	6
(Ukraine) K Baindl	1	3
(France) K Mladenovic	3	0
(Argentina) J Riera	6	6
(France) L Jeanjean	7^{7}	5	6
(Romania) G Lee	6^{4}	7	3
WC	(Morocco) A El Aouni	1	4
6	(Kazakhstan) Y Putintseva	6	6

Second round
1	(Italy) M Trevisan	7	7
Q	(Croatia) J Fett	5	5
(Austria) J Grabher	6	7^{7}
(Turkey) Ç Büyükakçay	1	6^{4}
3	(Egypt) M Sherif	5	5
(Argentina) J Riera	7	7
(France) L Jeanjean	2	1
6	(Kazakhstan) Y Putintseva	6	6

Quarterfinals
1	(Italy) M Trevisan	3	0^{r}
(Austria) J Grabher	6	0
(Argentina) J Riera	5	6	6
6	(Kazakhstan) Y Putintseva	7	4	2

Semifinals
(Austria) J Grabher	6	3	7^{8}
(Argentina) J Riera	1	6	6^{6}

=== Bottom half ===
First round
8	(Germany) T Maria	7	6^{5}	6
Q	T Prozorova	5	7^{7}	0
(Sweden) R Peterson	4	6^{7}
(Italy) L Bronzetti	6	7^{9}
K Rakhimova	6	6
WC	(Morocco) M El Allami	3	3
Q	A Tikhonova	3	6^{6}
4	(United States) A Parks	6	7^{8}
5	(Canada) L Fernandez	6	6
LL	(Spain) A Fita Boluda	3	4
(Hungary) P Udvardy	1	1
(United States) P Stearns	6	6
Q	(Hungary) T Babos	6	6
I Khromacheva	4	1
WC	V Zvonareva	5	4
2	(United States) S Stephens	7	6

Second round
8	(Germany) T Maria	7^{7}	4	5
(Italy) L Bronzetti	6^{1}	6	7
K Rakhimova	4	1
4	(United States) A Parks	6	6
5	(Canada) L Fernandez	3	6	2
(United States) P Stearns	6	2	6
Q	(Hungary) T Babos	3	1
2	(United States) S Stephens	6	6

Quarterfinals
(Italy) L Bronzetti	6	6
4	(United States) A Parks	2	0
(United States) P Stearns	7^{7}	3	6^{6}
2	(United States) S Stephens	6^{4}	6	7^{8}

Semifinals
(Italy) L Bronzetti	6	6
2	(United States) S Stephens	1	1

== Qualifying ==
=== Seeds ===
1. Anastasia Tikhonova (qualified)
2. Valeria Savinykh (first round)
3. (Hungary) Tímea Babos (qualified)
4. (Croatia) Jana Fett (qualified)
5. (Hong Kong) Eudice Chong (first round)
6. (Spain) Ángela Fita Boluda (qualifying competition, lucky loser)
7. Tatiana Prozorova (qualified)
8. (Latvia) Daniela Vismane (first round)

=== Qualifiers ===
1. Anastasia Tikhonova
2. Tatiana Prozorova
3. (Hungary) Tímea Babos
4. (Croatia) Jana Fett

=== Lucky loser ===
1. (Spain) Ángela Fita Boluda

=== Qualifying draw ===
==== First qualifier ====
First round
1	Anastasia Tikhonova	6^{3}	6	6
WC	(Hungary) Luca Udvardy	7^{7}	3	3
(Ukraine) Valeriya Strakhova	6	2	6
8	(Latvia) Daniela Vismane	2	6	1

Qualifying competition
1	Anastasia Tikhonova	6	6
(Ukraine) Valeriya Strakhova	2	3

==== Second qualifier ====
First round
2	Valeria Savinykh	2	1
(United States) Francesca Di Lorenzo	6	6
WC	(Morocco) Yasmine Kabbaj	0	6	1
7	Tatiana Prozorova	6	2	6

Qualifying competition
(United States) Francesca Di Lorenzo	4	3
7	Tatiana Prozorova	6	6

==== Third qualifier ====
First round
3	(Hungary) Tímea Babos	7	6
Ekaterina Yashina	5	4
(United Kingdom) Naiktha Bains	6	6
5	(Hong Kong) Eudice Chong	4	2

Qualifying competition
3	(Hungary) Tímea Babos	6	6
(United Kingdom) Naiktha Bains	3	0

==== Fourth qualifier ====
First round
4	(Croatia) Jana Fett	6^{3}	6	6
(Italy) Martina Colmegna	7^{7}	3	2
(Venezuela) Andrea Gámiz	4	1
6	(Spain) Ángela Fita Boluda	6	6

Qualifying competition
4	(Croatia) Jana Fett	6	7^{7}
6	(Spain) Ángela Fita Boluda	3	6^{5}
