= 2023 Grand Prix SAR La Princesse Lalla Meryem – Doubles =

Doubles
- 2023 Grand Prix SAR La Princesse Lalla Meryem

Final
- Champions: (United States) Sabrina Santamaria; Yana Sizikova
- Runners-up: Lidziya Marozava (Brazil) Ingrid Gamarra Martins
- Score: 3–6, 6–1, [10–8]

Events
Singles	Doubles
- Grand Prix SAR La Princesse Lalla Meryem

Sabrina Santamaria and Yana Sizikova defeated Lidziya Marozava and Ingrid Gamarra Martins in the final, 3–6, 6–1, [10–8] to win the doubles tennis title at the 2023 Morocco Open.

Eri Hozumi and Makoto Ninomiya were the defending champions, but chose not to compete together. Hozumi partnered with Ulrikke Eikeri, but lost in the first round to Marozava and Gamarra Martins. Ninomiya partnered with Monica Niculescu, but lost in the semifinals to Santamaria and Sizikova.

== Seeds ==
1. (Japan) Miyu Kato / (Indonesia) Aldila Sutjiadi (semifinals)
2. (Romania) Monica Niculescu / (Japan) Makoto Ninomiya (semifinals)
3. (Hungary) Tímea Babos / (Kazakhstan) Anna Danilina (quarterfinals)
4. (Norway) Ulrikke Eikeri / (Japan) Eri Hozumi (first round)

== Draw ==
Key

- Q = Qualifier
- WC = Wild card
- LL = Lucky loser
- Alt = Alternate
- ITF = ITF entry
- PR = Protected ranking
- SR = Special ranking
- SE = Special exempt
- JE = Junior exempt
- JR = Junior Accelerator Programme entrant
- CO = College Accelerator Programme entrant
- NG = Next Gen Accelerator Program entrant
- w/o = Walkover
- r = Retired
- d = Defaulted

=== Draw ===
First round
1	(Japan) M Kato (Indonesia) A Sutjiadi	6	6
WC	(Morocco) A El Aouni (Morocco) Y Kabbaj	2	1
(Germany) V Heisen (Estonia) I Neel	3	2
A Panova; V Zvonareva	6	6
4	(Norway) U Eikeri (Japan) E Hozumi	3	6^{5}
L Marozava (Brazil) I Gamarra Martins	6	7^{7}
(United Kingdom) A Barnett (United Kingdom) O Nicholls	6	4	[1]
Alt	(Hong Kong) E Chong (United States) F Di Lorenzo	1	6	[10]
(United States) S Santamaria; Y Sizikova	6	6
(Georgia (country)) O Kalashnikova (Poland) K Piter	3	4
(Czech Republic) A Dețiuc (Venezuela) A Gámiz	6^{3}	0
3	(Hungary) T Babos (Kazakhstan) A Danilina	7^{7}	6
(Georgia (country)) N Dzalamidze (Egypt) M Sherif	5	7	[5]
I Khromacheva (Ukraine) V Strakhova	7	5	[10]
WC	(Morocco) M El Allami (Hungary) L Udvardy	1	2
2	(Romania) M Niculescu (Japan) M Ninomiya	6	6

Quarterfinals
1	(Japan) M Kato (Indonesia) A Sutjiadi	2	6	[10]
A Panova; V Zvonareva	6	4	[2]
L Marozava (Brazil) I Gamarra Martins	6	7
Alt	(Hong Kong) E Chong (United States) F Di Lorenzo	4	5
(United States) S Santamaria; Y Sizikova	6	6
3	(Hungary) T Babos (Kazakhstan) A Danilina	3	1
I Khromacheva (Ukraine) V Strakhova	1	6	[8]
2	(Romania) M Niculescu (Japan) M Ninomiya	6	3	[10]

Semifinals
1	(Japan) M Kato (Indonesia) A Sutjiadi	2	3
L Marozava (Brazil) I Gamarra Martins	6	6
(United States) S Santamaria; Y Sizikova	1	6	[12]
2	(Romania) M Niculescu (Japan) M Ninomiya	6	4	[10]

Final
L Marozava (Brazil) I Gamarra Martins	6	1	[8]
(United States) S Santamaria; Y Sizikova	3	6	[10]
