= 2024 Makarska International Championships – Doubles =

Doubles
- 2024 Makarska International Championships

Final
- Champions: (United States) Sabrina Santamaria; Iryna Shymanovich
- Runners-up: (Japan) Nao Hibino (Georgia (country)) Oksana Kalashnikova
- Score: 6–4, 3–6, [10–6]

Events
Singles	Doubles
← 2023 ·	Makarska International Championships	· 2025 →

Sabrina Santamaria and Iryna Shymanovich won the doubles title at the 2024 Makarska International Championships, defeating Nao Hibino and Oksana Kalashnikova in the final, 6–4, 3–6, [10–6].

Ingrid Neel and Wu Fang-hsien were the reigning champions, but Neel was still competing at the French Open. Wu partnered Valeriya Strakhova, but lost in the first round to Tena Lukas and Kristina Mladenovic.

== Seeds ==
1. (Ukraine) Valeriya Strakhova / (Chinese Taipei) Wu Fang-hsien (first round)
2. (Greece) Valentini Grammatikopoulou / (Poland) Katarzyna Piter (semifinals)

== Draw ==
=== Key ===
- Q = Qualifier
- WC = Wild card
- LL = Lucky loser
- Alt = Alternate
- ITF = ITF entry
- PR = Protected ranking
- SR = Special ranking
- SE = Special exempt
- JE = Junior exempt
- JR = Junior Accelerator Programme entrant
- CO = College Accelerator Programme entrant
- NG = Next Gen Accelerator Program entrant
- w/o = Walkover
- r = Retired
- d = Defaulted

=== Draw ===
Quarterfinals
1	(Ukraine) V Strakhova (Chinese Taipei) F-h Wu	5	4
WC	(Croatia) T Lukas (France) K Mladenovic	7	6
(Czech Republic) J Malečková (Switzerland) C Perrin	3	2
(Japan) N Hibino (Georgia (country)) O Kalashnikova	6	6
(United States) S Santamaria; I Shymanovich	6	6
A Fomina-Klotz (India) P Thombare	4	0
(France) L Jeanjean (Latvia) D Semeņistaja	5	5
2	(Greece) V Grammatikopoulou (Poland) K Piter	7	7

Semifinals
WC	(Croatia) T Lukas (France) K Mladenovic	6	5	[8]
(Japan) N Hibino (Georgia (country)) O Kalashnikova	2	7	[10]
(United States) S Santamaria; I Shymanovich	6	5	[10]
2	(Greece) V Grammatikopoulou (Poland) K Piter	3	7	[5]

Final
(Japan) N Hibino (Georgia (country)) O Kalashnikova	4	6	[6]
(United States) S Santamaria; I Shymanovich	6	3	[10]
