= 2023 Makarska International Championships – Doubles =

Doubles
- 2023 Makarska International Championships

Final
- Champions: (Estonia) Ingrid Neel (Chinese Taipei) Wu Fang-hsien
- Runners-up: (Czech Republic) Anna Sisková (Czech Republic) Renata Voráčová
- Score: 6–3, 7–5

Events
Singles	Doubles
← 2022 ·	Makarska International Championships	· 2024 →

Dalila Jakupović and Tena Lukas were the reigning champions, but chose not to participate.

Ingrid Neel and Wu Fang-hsien won the title, defeating Anna Sisková and Renata Voráčová in the final, 6–3, 7–5.

== Seeds ==
1. (Japan) Makoto Ninomiya / Alexandra Panova (semifinals)
2. (Estonia) Ingrid Neel / (Chinese Taipei) Wu Fang-hsien (champions)

== Draw ==
=== Key ===
- Q = Qualifier
- WC = Wild card
- LL = Lucky loser
- Alt = Alternate
- SE = Special exempt
- PR = Protected ranking
- ITF = ITF entry
- JE = Junior exempt
- w/o = Walkover
- r = Retired
- d = Defaulted
- SR = Special ranking

=== Draw ===
Quarterfinals
1	(Japan) M Ninomiya; A Panova	6	6
(Japan) M Hontama (Hungary) RL Jani	2	3
A Fomina-Klotz (Australia) O Tjandramulia	6	4	[5]
(Czech Republic) A Sisková (Czech Republic) R Voráčová	4	6	[10]
WC	K Dmitruk (Croatia) M Dražić	6	5	[10]
(Georgia (country)) N Dzalamidze (Ukraine) V Strakhova	3	7	[8]
(France) L Jeanjean (France) D Parry	6^{4}	3
2	(Estonia) I Neel (Chinese Taipei) F-h Wu	7^{7}	6

Semifinals
1	(Japan) M Ninomiya; A Panova	6	5	[6]
(Czech Republic) A Sisková (Czech Republic) R Voráčová	2	7	[10]
WC	K Dmitruk (Croatia) M Dražić	0	2
2	(Estonia) I Neel (Chinese Taipei) F-h Wu	6	6

Final
(Czech Republic) A Sisková (Czech Republic) R Voráčová	3	5
2	(Estonia) I Neel (Chinese Taipei) F-h Wu	6	7
