= 2023 Makarska International Championships – Singles =

Singles
- 2023 Makarska International Championships

Final
- Champion: (Egypt) Mayar Sherif
- Runner-up: (Italy) Jasmine Paolini
- Score: 2–6, 7–6^{(8–6)}, 7–5

Events
Singles	Doubles
← 2022 ·	Makarska International Championships	· 2024 →

Jule Niemeier was the reigning champion, but chose not to participate.

Mayar Sherif won the title, defeating Jasmine Paolini in the final, 2–6, 7–6^{(8–6)}, 7–5. She saved six championship points en route to the title, five in the second set and one in the third set.

== Seeds ==
1. (Czech Republic) Linda Nosková (quarterfinals)
2. (Italy) Jasmine Paolini (final)
3. (Egypt) Mayar Sherif (champion)
4. (United States) Peyton Stearns (second round)
5. (France) Diane Parry (semifinals)
6. (Ukraine) Kateryna Baindl (quarterfinals)
7. (Sweden) Rebecca Peterson (second round, withdrew)
8. (Hungary) Dalma Gálfi (first round)

== Draw ==
=== Key ===
- Q = Qualifier
- WC = Wild card
- LL = Lucky loser
- Alt = Alternate
- SE = Special exempt
- PR = Protected ranking
- ITF = ITF entry
- JE = Junior exempt
- w/o = Walkover
- r = Retired
- d = Defaulted
- SR = Special ranking

=== Finals ===
Semifinals
5	(France) Diane Parry	5	2
3/WC	(Egypt) Mayar Sherif	7	6
Q	(Slovakia) Rebecca Šramková	3	4
2	(Italy) Jasmine Paolini	6	6

Final
3/WC	(Egypt) Mayar Sherif	2	7^{8}	7
2	(Italy) Jasmine Paolini	6	6^{6}	5

=== Top half ===
First round
1	(Czech Republic) L Nosková	6	7
(Latvia) D Semeņistaja	2	5
(Germany) M Barthel	4	6	2
(France) E Jacquemot	6	4	6
Q	(Romania) M Bulgaru	6	4	6
(France) C Paquet	3	6	4
WC	(Croatia) P Marčinko	2	4
5	(France) D Parry	6	6
3/WC	(Egypt) M Sherif	6	6
(Slovenia) T Zidanšek	3	2
WC	K Dmitruk	6	6
WC	(Hungary) N Szabanin	4	1
(France) L Jeanjean	6	6
Q	(North Macedonia) L Gjorcheska	4	4
(China) Y Yuan	3	6	6
8	(Hungary) D Gálfi	6	3	0

Second round
1	(Czech Republic) L Nosková	6	7^{9}
(France) E Jacquemot	3	6^{7}
Q	(Romania) M Bulgaru	2	6	3
5	(France) D Parry	6	4	6
3/WC	(Egypt) M Sherif	6	6
WC	K Dmitruk	2	4
(France) L Jeanjean	0	4
(China) Y Yuan	6	6

Quarterfinals
1	(Czech Republic) L Nosková	6	6^{1}	3
5	(France) D Parry	1	7^{7}	6
3/WC	(Egypt) M Sherif	6	7^{7}
(China) Y Yuan	3	6^{5}

Semifinals
5	(France) D Parry	5	2
3/WC	(Egypt) M Sherif	7	6

=== Bottom half ===
First round
6	(Ukraine) K Baindl	7	6
(France) K Mladenovic	5	1
(Japan) M Hontama	3	4
D Astakhova	6	6
(Slovenia) D Jakupović	6	1	2
Q	(Slovakia) R Šramková	2	6	6
(Hungary) RL Jani	6	4	2
4	(United States) P Stearns	2	6	6
7	(Sweden) R Peterson	6	6
WC	(Croatia) T Lukas	0	1
(Czech Republic) S Bejlek	4	2
(Croatia) A Konjuh	6	6
(Brazil) L Pigossi	3	4
Q	(Ukraine) K Zavatska	6	6
(Croatia) A Ružić	4	3
2	(Italy) J Paolini	6	6

Second round
6	(Ukraine) K Baindl	6	6
D Astakhova	2	4
Q	(Slovakia) R Šramková	6	7
4	(United States) P Stearns	3	5
7	(Sweden) R Peterson
(Croatia) A Konjuh	w/o
Q	(Ukraine) K Zavatska	2	6	6^{10}
2	(Italy) J Paolini	6	4	7^{12}

Quarterfinals
6	(Ukraine) K Baindl	6^{8}	7	5
Q	(Slovakia) R Šramková	7^{10}	5	7
(Croatia) A Konjuh
2	(Italy) J Paolini	w/o

Semifinals
Q	(Slovakia) R Šramková	3	4
2	(Italy) J Paolini	6	6

== Qualifying ==
=== Seeds ===
1. (Ukraine) Katarina Zavatska (qualified)
2. (Slovakia) Rebecca Šramková (qualified)
3. (North Macedonia) Lina Gjorcheska (qualified)
4. (Romania) Miriam Bulgaru (qualified)

=== Qualifiers ===
1. (Ukraine) Katarina Zavatska
2. (Slovakia) Rebecca Šramková
3. (North Macedonia) Lina Gjorcheska
4. (Romania) Miriam Bulgaru

=== Qualifying draw ===
==== First qualifier ====
Qualifying competition
1	(Ukraine) Katarina Zavatska	7^{7}	6
	(Croatia) Lea Bošković	6^{3}	4

==== Second qualifier ====
Qualifying competition
2	(Slovakia) Rebecca Šramková	6	6
WC	(Croatia) Ayline Samardžić	2	2

==== Third qualifier ====
Qualifying competition
3	(North Macedonia) Lina Gjorcheska	6	6
WC	(Bosnia and Herzegovina) Dea Herdželaš	3	2

==== Fourth qualifier ====
Qualifying competition
4	(Romania) Miriam Bulgaru	6	4	7
	(Slovenia) Veronika Erjavec	2	6	5
