= 2022 Makarska International Championships – Doubles =

Doubles
- 2022 Makarska International Championships

Final
- Champions: (Slovenia) Dalila Jakupović (Croatia) Tena Lukas
- Runners-up: (Serbia) Olga Danilović (Serbia) Aleksandra Krunić
- Score: 5–7, 6–2, [10–5]

Events
Singles	Doubles
← 2021 ·	Makarska International Championships	· 2023 →

Aliona Bolsova and Katarzyna Kawa were the defending champions, but chose not to participate.

Dalila Jakupović and Tena Lukas won the title, defeating Olga Danilović and Aleksandra Krunić in the final, 5–7, 6–2, [10–5].

== Seeds ==
1. Anastasia Potapova / Yana Sizikova (quarterfinals)
2. (Germany) Julia Lohoff / (Czech Republic) Renata Voráčová (quarterfinals, retired)

== Draw ==
Key

- Q = Qualifier
- WC = Wild card
- LL = Lucky loser
- Alt = Alternate
- ITF = ITF entry
- PR = Protected ranking
- SR = Special ranking
- SE = Special exempt
- JE = Junior exempt
- JR = Junior Accelerator Programme entrant
- CO = College Accelerator Programme entrant
- NG = Next Gen Accelerator Program entrant
- w/o = Walkover
- r = Retired
- d = Defaulted

=== Draw ===
Quarterfinals
1	A Potapova; Y Sizikova	1	6	[10]
(Czech Republic) L Nosková; O Selekhmeteva	6	2	[12]
(Czech Republic) A Dețiuc (Czech Republic) M Kolodziejová	5	2
(Serbia) O Danilović (Serbia) A Krunić	7	6
A Gasanova; A Tikhonova	2	5
WC	(Croatia) M Dražić (Hungary) AK Tóth	6	7
(Slovenia) D Jakupović (Croatia) T Lukas	5
2	(Germany) J Lohoff (Czech Republic) R Voráčová	0^{r}

Semifinals
(Czech Republic) L Nosková; O Selekhmeteva	4	6	[10]
(Serbia) O Danilović (Serbia) A Krunić	6	2	[12]
WC	(Croatia) M Dražić (Hungary) AK Tóth	2	6	[3]
(Slovenia) D Jakupović (Croatia) T Lukas	6	4	[10]

Final
(Serbia) O Danilović (Serbia) A Krunić	7	2	[5]
(Slovenia) D Jakupović (Croatia) T Lukas	5	6	[10]
