= 2025 Makarska Open =

- Date: 3–8 June
- Edition: 19th
- Category: WTA 125
- Surface: Clay
- Location: Makarska, Croatia
- Venue: Tennis Center Makarska

Champions

Singles
- (Czech Republic) Sára Bejlek

Doubles
- (Czech Republic) Jesika Malečková / (Czech Republic) Miriam Škoch
← 2024 ·	Makarska International Championships	· 2026 →

The 2025 Makarska Open hosted by Valamar was a professional women's tennis tournament played on outdoor clay courts. It was the 19th edition of the tournament and part of the 2025 WTA 125 tournaments. The event took place from 3 to 8 June 2025 at the Tennis Center in Makarska, Croatia.

== Singles main draw entrants ==
=== Seeds ===
Country	Player	Rank^{1}	Seed
AUS	Maya Joint	53	1
USA	Katie Volynets	65	2
MEX	Renata Zarazúa	74	3
EGY	Mayar Sherif	76	4
FRA	Diane Parry	93	5
GER	Ella Seidel	111	6
CRO	Petra Martić	116	7
LAT	Darja Semeņistaja	124	8

- ^{1} Rankings as of 26 May 2025.

=== Other entrants ===
The following players received a wildcard into the singles main draw:

- (Croatia) Ana Konjuh
- (Croatia) Tena Lukas
- (Croatia) Petra Marčinko
- (Egypt) Mayar Sherif

The following players received entry from the qualifying draw:

- (France) Margaux Rouvroy
- (Ukraine) Anastasiia Sobolieva
- (Croatia) Sara Svetac
- (Croatia) Tara Würth

=== Withdrawals ===
- (Argentina) María Lourdes Carlé → replaced by (United States) Lauren Davis
- (Romania) Jaqueline Cristian → replaced by Tatiana Prozorova
- (France) Léolia Jeanjean → replaced by (United States) Louisa Chirico
- (Australia) Daria Saville → replaced by (Germany) Mona Barthel
- Oksana Selekhmeteva → replaced by (Croatia) Lea Bošković
- (Serbia) Nina Stojanović → replaced by (Romania) Patricia Maria Țig
- (Hungary) Panna Udvardy → replaced by (Czech Republic) Sára Bejlek
- (Japan) Moyuka Uchijima → replaced by (Serbia) Lola Radivojević
- (Switzerland) Simona Waltert → replaced by (Romania) Miriam Bulgaru
- (China) Wang Xiyu → replaced by (Belgium) Hanne Vandewinkel

== Doubles entrants ==
=== Seeds ===
Country	Player	Country	Player	Rank^{1}	Seed
GEO	Oksana Kalashnikova		Elena Pridankina	154	1
CZE	Jesika Malečková	CZE	Miriam Škoch	200	2

- ^{1} Rankings as of 26 May 2024.

=== Other entrants ===
The following pair received a wildcard into the doubles main draw:

- (Croatia) Petra Marčinko / (Croatia) Tara Würth

The following pair received entry as alternates:

- (Germany) Tamara Korpatsch / (Romania) Patricia Maria Țig

=== Withdrawals ===
- (Serbia) Lola Radivojević / (Slovenia) Tamara Zidanšek → replaced by (Germany) Tamara Korpatsch / (Romania) Patricia Maria Țig

== Champions ==
=== Singles ===
- (Czech Republic) Sára Bejlek def. (Andorra) Victoria Jiménez Kasintseva 6–0, 6–1

=== Doubles ===
- (Czech Republic) Jesika Malečková / (Czech Republic) Miriam Škoch def. (Georgia (country)) Oksana Kalashnikova / Elena Pridankina, 2–6, 6–3, [10–4]
