= 2024 Makarska International Championships – Singles =

Singles
- 2024 Makarska International Championships

Final
- Champion: (United States) Katie Volynets
- Runner-up: (Egypt) Mayar Sherif
- Score: 3–6, 6–2, 6–1

Events
Singles	Doubles
← 2023 ·	Makarska International Championships	· 2025 →

Katie Volynets defeated defending champion Mayar Sherif, 3–6, 6–2, 6–1, to win the singles title at the 2024 Makarska International Championships.

== Seeds ==
1. (Spain) Sara Sorribes Tormo (first round)
2. (Egypt) Mayar Sherif (final)
3. (Slovakia) Anna Karolína Schmiedlová (second round)
4. (China) Wang Xiyu (semifinals)
5. (Croatia) Petra Martić (semifinals)
6. (Czech Republic) Brenda Fruhvirtová (quarterfinals, retired)
7. (Japan) Nao Hibino (quarterfinals)
8. (United States) Katie Volynets (champion)

== Draw ==
=== Key ===
- Q = Qualifier
- WC = Wild card
- LL = Lucky loser
- Alt = Alternate
- ITF = ITF entry
- PR = Protected ranking
- SR = Special ranking
- SE = Special exempt
- JE = Junior exempt
- JR = Junior Accelerator Programme entrant
- CO = College Accelerator Programme entrant
- NG = Next Gen Accelerator Program entrant
- w/o = Walkover
- r = Retired
- d = Defaulted

=== Finals ===
Semifinals
8	(United States) Katie Volynets	6	6
4	(China) Wang Xiyu	4	3
5/WC	(Croatia) Petra Martić	6	3	4
2	(Egypt) Mayar Sherif	4	6	6

Final
8	(United States) Katie Volynets	3	6	6
2	(Egypt) Mayar Sherif	6	2	1

=== Top half ===
First round
1/WC	(Spain) S Sorribes Tormo	6^{6}	2
(Romania) M Bulgaru	7^{8}	6
(France) L Jeanjean	6	6
WC	(Croatia) T Lukas	2	2
(Ukraine) K Baindl	1	6	2
(Switzerland) L Sun	6	2	6
I Shymanovich	3	0
8	(United States) K Volynets	6	6
4	(China) Xiy Wang	6	4	6
Q	(Croatia) S Svetac	2	6	1
(Croatia) L Ćirić Bagarić	0	6	6
(Germany) E Seidel	6	3	1
E Makarova	6	5
J Avdeeva	2	0^{r}
(Switzerland) S Waltert	2	3
6	(Czech Republic) B Fruhvirtová	6	6

Second round
(Romania) M Bulgaru	4	2
(France) L Jeanjean	6	6
(Switzerland) L Sun	4	5
8	(United States) K Volynets	6	7
4	(China) Xiy Wang	7	7^{8}
(Croatia) L Ćirić Bagarić	5	6^{6}
E Makarova	0	5
6	(Czech Republic) B Fruhvirtová	6	7

Quarterfinals
(France) L Jeanjean	6	4	1
8	(United States) K Volynets	3	6	6
4	(China) Xiy Wang	5
6	(Czech Republic) B Fruhvirtová	0^{r}

Semifinals
8	(United States) K Volynets	6	6
4	(China) Xiy Wang	4	3

=== Bottom half ===
First round
5/WC	(Croatia) P Martić	6	6
WC	(Croatia) P Marčinko	4	4
Q	(Ukraine) V Strakhova	6	3	2
(Croatia) L Bošković	4	6	6
Q	(Australia) M Joint	6	6
(Croatia) A Ružić	1	1
(Slovenia) P Hercog	0	3
3	(Slovakia) AK Schmiedlová	6	6
7	(Japan) N Hibino	7	7^{8}
(Hungary) A Bondár	5	6^{6}
(Germany) N Noha Akugue	6	6
P Kudermetova	1	0
(Philippines) A Eala	6	3	2
Q	M Timofeeva	1	6	6
(Latvia) D Semeņistaja	1	3
2	(Egypt) M Sherif	6	6

Second round
5/WC	(Croatia) P Martić	7^{8}	6
(Croatia) L Bošković	6^{6}	4
Q	(Australia) M Joint	6	7
3	(Slovakia) AK Schmiedlová	3	5
7	(Japan) N Hibino	6	6
(Germany) N Noha Akugue	0	0
Q	M Timofeeva	2	6	5
2	(Egypt) M Sherif	6	3	7

Quarterfinals
5/WC	(Croatia) P Martić	6	6^{4}	7^{7}
Q	(Australia) M Joint	4	7^{7}	6^{3}
7	(Japan) N Hibino	1	3
2	(Egypt) M Sherif	6	6

Semifinals
5/WC	(Croatia) P Martić	6	3	4
2	(Egypt) M Sherif	4	6	6

== Qualifying ==
=== Seeds ===
1. Maria Timofeeva (qualified)
2. (Australia) Maya Joint (qualified)
3. (France) Kristina Mladenovic (qualifying competition)
4. (Ukraine) Valeriya Strakhova (qualified)

=== Qualifiers ===
1. Maria Timofeeva
2. (Australia) Maya Joint
3. (Croatia) Sara Svetac
4. (Ukraine) Valeriya Strakhova

=== Qualifying draw ===
==== First qualifier ====
Qualifying competition
1	Maria Timofeeva	7^{7}	6
	(Slovenia) Nika Radišić	6^{1}	2

==== Second qualifier ====
Qualifying competition
2	(Australia) Maya Joint	6	3
WC	(Georgia (country)) Ekaterine Gorgodze	3	0^{r}

==== Third qualifier ====
Qualifying competition
3	(France) Kristina Mladenovic	4	6	3
WC	(Croatia) Sara Svetac	6	3	6

==== Fourth qualifier ====
Qualifying competition
4	(Ukraine) Valeriya Strakhova	6^{4}	6	6
	(Hungary) Réka Luca Jani	7^{7}	4	2
