= 2022 Makarska International Championships – Singles =

Singles
- 2022 Makarska International Championships

Final
- Champion: (Germany) Jule Niemeier
- Runner-up: (Italy) Elisabetta Cocciaretto
- Score: 7–5, 6–1

Events
| Singles | Doubles |
| ← 2021 · | Makarska International Championships | · 2023 → |

Jasmine Paolini was the defending champion, but chose not to participate.

Jule Niemeier won the title, defeating Elisabetta Cocciaretto in the final, 7–5, 6–1.

== Seeds ==
1. Varvara Gracheva (second round)
2. (Italy) Lucia Bronzetti (first round)
3. Anastasia Potapova (second round)
4. (Poland) Magdalena Fręch (first round)
5. (Slovakia) Anna Karolína Schmiedlová (semifinals)
6. (France) Clara Burel (quarterfinals)
7. (Germany) Jule Niemeier (champion)
8. (Georgia (country)) Ekaterine Gorgodze (first round, retired)

== Draw ==
=== Key ===
- Q = Qualifier
- WC = Wild card
- LL = Lucky loser
- Alt = Alternate
- SE = Special exempt
- PR = Protected ranking
- ITF = ITF entry
- JE = Junior exempt
- w/o = Walkover
- r = Retired
- d = Defaulted
- SR = Special ranking

=== Finals ===
Semifinals
5 | (Slovakia) Anna Karolína Schmiedlová | 6^{7} | 1
(Italy) Elisabetta Cocciaretto | 7^{9} | 6
(Czech Republic) Linda Nosková | 2 | 1
7 | (Germany) Jule Niemeier | 6 | 6

Final
(Italy) Elisabetta Cocciaretto | 5 | 1
7 | (Germany) Jule Niemeier | 7 | 6

=== Top half ===
First round
1 | V Gracheva | 7 | 6
Q | (Slovenia) D Jakupović | 5 | 4
(Serbia) O Danilović | 6 | 6
Q | (Japan) E Hozumi | 2 | 1
WC | (Croatia) A Ružić | 4 | 6 | 7^{9}
WC | (Bosnia and Herzegovina) D Herdželaš | 6 | 1 | 6^{7}
(Serbia) A Krunić | 3 | 6^{5}
5 | (Slovakia) AK Schmiedlová | 6 | 7^{7}
4 | (Poland) M Fręch | 1 | 0
(Italy) E Cocciaretto | 6 | 6
(Austria) J Grabher | 6 | 6
Q | (Croatia) M Dražić | 2 | 3
E Avanesyan | 6 | 6
(France) C Monnet | 3 | 3
(Romania) I Bara | 6 | 1 | 3
6 | (France) C Burel | 3 | 6 | 6

Second round
1 | V Gracheva | 4 | 3
(Serbia) O Danilović | 6 | 6
WC | (Croatia) A Ružić | 3 | 5
5 | (Slovakia) AK Schmiedlová | 6 | 7
(Italy) E Cocciaretto | 6 | 7
(Austria) J Grabher | 4 | 5
E Avanesyan | 7 | 3 | 3
6 | (France) C Burel | 5 | 6 | 6

Quarterfinals
(Serbia) O Danilović | 5 | 1
5 | (Slovakia) AK Schmiedlová | 7 | 6
(Italy) E Cocciaretto | 6 | 6
6 | (France) C Burel | 2 | 4

Semifinals
5 | (Slovakia) AK Schmiedlová | 6^{7} | 1
(Italy) E Cocciaretto | 7^{9} | 6

=== Bottom half ===
First round
8 | (Georgia (country)) E Gorgodze | 5 | 0^{r}
(Czech Republic) L Nosková | 7 | 3
O Selekhmeteva | 6^{5} | 6 | 5
(Bulgaria) V Tomova | 7^{7} | 4 | 7
WC | (Croatia) T Würth | 6 | 6
(Hungary) RL Jani | 2 | 4
(United States) B Pera | 2 | 6 | 1
3 | A Potapova | 6 | 4 | 6
7 | (Germany) J Niemeier | 6 | 4
(Australia) A Sharma | 3 | 3^{r}
(China) Xiy Wang | 6 | 6
WC | (Croatia) T Lukas | 3 | 4
Q | (Croatia) A Samardžić | 0 | 1
A Tikhonova | 6 | 6
A Gasanova | 1 | 6 | 7
2 | (Italy) L Bronzetti | 6 | 4 | 5

Second round
(Czech Republic) L Nosková | 6 | 6
(Bulgaria) V Tomova | 3 | 3
WC | (Croatia) T Würth | 2 | 6 | 6
3 | A Potapova | 6 | 3 | 4
7 | (Germany) J Niemeier | 6^{5} | 6 | 6
(China) Xiy Wang | 7^{7} | 2 | 4
A Tikhonova | 7^{14} | 3 | 0
A Gasanova | 6^{12} | 6 | 6

Quarterfinals
(Czech Republic) L Nosková | 6 | 7
WC | (Croatia) T Würth | 4 | 5
7 | (Germany) J Niemeier | 6 | 7
A Gasanova | 2 | 5

Semifinals
(Czech Republic) L Nosková | 2 | 1
7 | (Germany) J Niemeier | 6 | 6

== Qualifying ==
=== Seeds ===
1. (Slovenia) Dalila Jakupović (qualified)
2. (Japan) Eri Hozumi (qualified)
3. (Croatia) Mariana Dražić (qualified)

=== Qualifiers ===
1. (Slovenia) Dalila Jakupović
2. (Japan) Eri Hozumi
3. (Croatia) Mariana Dražić
4. (Croatia) Ayline Samardžić

=== Qualifying draw ===
==== First qualifier ====
| Qualifying competition |
| 1 | (Slovenia) Dalila Jakupović |
| | Bye |

==== Second qualifier ====
| Qualifying competition |
| 2 | (Japan) Eri Hozumi |
| | Bye |

==== Third qualifier ====
| Qualifying competition |
| 3 | (Croatia) Mariana Dražić |
| | Bye |

==== Fourth qualifier ====
| Qualifying competition |
| WC | (United States) Emira Stafford | 1 | 4 |
| WC | (Croatia) Ayline Samardžić | 6 | 6 |
