= 2026 Makarska Open – Doubles =

Doubles
- 2026 Makarska Open

Final
- Champions: (Netherlands) Isabelle Haverlag (Switzerland) Simona Waltert
- Runners-up: (Brazil) Ingrid Martins; Ekaterina Ovcharenko
- Score: 2–2 ret.

Events
Singles	Doubles
- Makarska International Championships

Jesika Malečková and Miriam Škoch were the reigning champions, but did not participate this year.

Isabelle Haverlag and Simona Waltert won the title, defeating Ingrid Martins and Ekaterina Ovcharenko after the latter team retired in the first set at the score 2–2.

== Seeds ==
1. (Australia) Maya Joint / (Slovakia) Rebecca Šramková (quarterfinals)
2. (Netherlands) Isabelle Haverlag / (Switzerland) Simona Waltert (champions)

== Draw ==
Key

- Q = Qualifier
- WC = Wild card
- LL = Lucky loser
- Alt = Alternate
- ITF = ITF entry
- PR = Protected ranking
- SR = Special ranking
- SE = Special exempt
- JE = Junior exempt
- JR = Junior Accelerator Programme entrant
- CO = College Accelerator Programme entrant
- NG = Next Gen Accelerator Program entrant
- w/o = Walkover
- r = Retired
- d = Defaulted

=== Draw ===
Quarterfinals
1	(Australia) M Joint (Slovakia) R Šramková	4	6	[7]
(Brazil) I Martins; E Ovcharenko	6	4	[10]
WC	(Spain) A Lázaro García (Croatia) T Lukas	6	6
(Switzerland) N Karamoko (Latvia) D Semeņistaja	2	1
(Andorra) V Jiménez Kasintseva (Serbia) L Radivojević	2	0
(Argentina) N Fossa Huergo (Slovenia) D Jakupović	6	6
(Czech Republic) L Havlíčková (Czech Republic) D Šalková	2	7^{7}	[8]
2	(Netherlands) I Haverlag (Switzerland) S Waltert	6	6^{2}	[10]

Semifinals
(Brazil) I Martins; E Ovcharenko	6	6
WC	(Spain) A Lázaro García (Croatia) T Lukas	2	1
(Argentina) N Fossa Huergo (Slovenia) D Jakupović	0	6	[10]
2	(Netherlands) I Haverlag (Switzerland) S Waltert	6	4	[12]

Final
(Brazil) I Martins; E Ovcharenko	2^{r}
2	(Netherlands) I Haverlag (Switzerland) S Waltert	2
