= 2026 Makarska Open – Singles =

Singles
- 2026 Makarska Open

Final
- Champion: (Uzbekistan) Maria Timofeeva
- Runner-up: (Latvia) Darja Semeņistaja
- Score: 6–2, 6–3.

Events
Singles	Doubles
- Makarska International Championships

Sára Bejlek was the reigning champion, but did not participate this year.

Maria Timofeeva won the title, defeating Darja Semeņistaja 6–2, 6–3 in the final.

== Seeds ==
1. (Croatia) Petra Marčinko (second round)
2. (Australia) Maya Joint (second round)
3. (Switzerland) Simona Waltert (second round)
4. (Andorra) Victoria Jiménez Kasintseva (first round)
5. (Latvia) Darja Semeņistaja (final)
6. (Czech Republic) Dominika Šalková (second round)
7. (Uzbekistan) Maria Timofeeva (champion)
8. (France) Léolia Jeanjean (first round)

== Draw ==
Key

- Q = Qualifier
- WC = Wild card
- LL = Lucky loser
- Alt = Alternate
- ITF = ITF entry
- PR = Protected ranking
- SR = Special ranking
- SE = Special exempt
- JE = Junior exempt
- JR = Junior Accelerator Programme entrant
- CO = College Accelerator Programme entrant
- NG = Next Gen Accelerator Program entrant
- w/o = Walkover
- r = Retired
- d = Defaulted

=== Finals ===
Semifinals
LL	(Armenia) Elina Avanesyan	1	2
5	(Latvia) Darja Semeņistaja	6	6
(Spain) Sara Sorribes Tormo	2	5
7	(Uzbekistan) Maria Timofeeva	6	7

Final
5	(Latvia) Darja Semeņistaja	2	3
7	(Uzbekistan) Maria Timofeeva	6	6

=== Top half ===
First round
1/WC	(Croatia) P Marčinko	6	6
Q	(Sweden) C Hennemann	1	0
(Czech Republic) B Palicová	6	6
WC	(Croatia) L Ćirić Bagarić	2	4
(Slovenia) T Zidanšek	5	6	3
LL	(Armenia) E Avanesyan	7	4	6
WC	(Croatia) A Konjuh	3	2
6	(Czech Republic) D Šalková	6	6
3	(Switzerland) S Waltert	6	6
(Serbia) T Kostović	0	3
(Spain) A Lázaro García	6	6
(Czech Republic) L Samson	4	1
(Slovakia) R Šramková	6	3	1
LL	(United States) A Urhobo	3	6	6
WC	(Croatia) T Lukas	3	7	6^{5}
5	(Latvia) D Semeņistaja	6	5	7^{7}

Second round
1/WC	(Croatia) P Marčinko	6	6^{3}	4
(Czech Republic) B Palicová	0	7^{7}	6
LL	(Armenia) E Avanesyan	3	7^{7}	6
6	(Czech Republic) D Šalková	6	6^{5}	3
3	(Switzerland) S Waltert	4	3
(Spain) A Lázaro García	6	6
LL	(United States) A Urhobo	4	4
5	(Latvia) D Semeņistaja	6	6

Quarterfinals
(Czech Republic) B Palicová	0	6	1
LL	(Armenia) E Avanesyan	6	3	6
(Spain) A Lázaro García	6^{4}	6	6^{5}
5	(Latvia) D Semeņistaja	7^{7}	3	7^{7}

Semifinals
LL	(Armenia) E Avanesyan	1	2
5	(Latvia) D Semeņistaja	6	6

=== Bottom half ===
First round
8	(France) L Jeanjean	1	6	3
(Sweden) K Rinaldo Persson	6	4	6
(Romania) M Bulgaru	6^{3}	5
(Germany) N Noha Akugue	7^{7}	7
(Serbia) L Radivojević	7^{7}	0	7
(Serbia) M Ristić	6^{4}	6	5
(Spain) S Sorribes Tormo	6	6
4	(Andorra) V Jiménez Kasintseva	1	1
7	(Uzbekistan) M Timofeeva	6	6
Q	E Andreeva	3	2
PR	(United States) R Montgomery	6	5	1
Q	(Croatia) L Bošković	3	7	6
(Czech Republic) L Havlíčková	6^{5}	5
Q	(Morocco) Y Kabbaj	7^{7}	7
(Poland) K Kawa	5	1
2	(Australia) M Joint	7	6

Second round
(Sweden) K Rinaldo Persson	2	5
(Germany) N Noha Akugue	6	7
(Serbia) L Radivojević	2	4
(Spain) S Sorribes Tormo	6	6
7	(Uzbekistan) M Timofeeva	6	6
Q	(Croatia) L Bošković	4	3
Q	(Morocco) Y Kabbaj	6	6
2	(Australia) M Joint	3	4

Quarterfinals
(Germany) N Noha Akugue	0	4
(Spain) S Sorribes Tormo	6	6
7	(Uzbekistan) M Timofeeva	7	6
Q	(Morocco) Y Kabbaj	5	1

Semifinals
(Spain) S Sorribes Tormo	2	5
7	(Uzbekistan) M Timofeeva	6	7

== Qualifying ==
=== Seeds ===
1. (United States) Akasha Urhobo (qualifying competition, lucky loser)
2. Erika Andreeva (qualified)
3. (Sweden) Caijsa Hennemann (qualified)
4. (Morocco) Yasmine Kabbaj (qualified)

=== Qualifiers ===
1. (Croatia) Lea Bošković
2. Erika Andreeva
3. (Sweden) Caijsa Hennemann
4. (Morocco) Yasmine Kabbaj

=== Lucky losers ===
1. (Armenia) Elina Avanesyan
2. (United States) Akasha Urhobo

=== Qualifying draw ===
==== First qualifier ====
Qualifying competition
1	(United States) Akasha Urhobo	6^{4}	2
WC	(Croatia) Lea Bošković	7^{7}	6

==== Second qualifier ====
Qualifying competition
2	Erika Andreeva	7^{8}	6
	(Armenia) Elina Avanesyan	6^{6}	4

==== Third qualifier ====
Qualifying competition
3	(Sweden) Caijsa Hennemann	6	6
WC	(Germany) Jule Niemeier	3	1

==== Fourth qualifier ====
Qualifying competition
4	(Morocco) Yasmine Kabbaj	6	6
	(Slovenia) Dalila Jakupović	3	3
