= 2022 Makarska International Championships =

- Date: 31 May – 5 June
- Edition: 16th
- Category: WTA 125
- Prize money: $115,000
- Surface: Clay
- Location: Makarska, Croatia
- Venue: Tennis Center Makarska

Champions

Singles
- (Germany) Jule Niemeier

Doubles
- (Slovenia) Dalila Jakupović / (Croatia) Tena Lukas
- Makarska International Championships

The 2022 Makarska International Championships, also known as Makarska Open hosted by Valamar, was a professional tennis tournament played on outdoor clay courts. It was the sixteenth edition of the tournament and part of the 2022 WTA 125 tournaments. The previous editions of the tournament were held in Bol as the Croatia Bol Ladies Open but in 2022, the event was relocated to Makarska which once hosted a WTA Tier-IV event in 1998. It took place from 31 May to 5 June 2022.

== Singles main draw entrants ==
=== Seeds ===
Country	Player	Rank^{1}	Seed
	Varvara Gracheva	71	1
ITA	Lucia Bronzetti	73	2
	Anastasia Potapova	80	3
POL	Magdalena Fręch	89	4
SVK	Anna Karolína Schmiedlová	92	5
FRA	Clara Burel	94	6
GER	Jule Niemeier	102	7
GEO	Ekaterine Gorgodze	108	8

- ^{1} Rankings as of 23 May 2022.

=== Other entrants ===
The following players received a wildcard into the singles main draw:

- (Bosnia and Herzegovina) Dea Herdželaš
- (Croatia) Tena Lukas
- (Croatia) Antonia Ružić
- (Croatia) Tara Würth

The following players entered the singles main draw through qualification:

- (Croatia) Mariana Dražić
- (Japan) Eri Hozumi
- (Slovenia) Dalila Jakupović
- (Croatia) Ayline Samardžić

=== Withdrawals ===
Before the tournament

- (Hungary) Anna Bondár → replaced by Anastasia Gasanova
- (United States) Madison Brengle → replaced by (Czech Republic) Linda Nosková
- (Hungary) Dalma Gálfi → replaced by (China) Wang Xiyu
- (Brazil) Beatriz Haddad Maia → replaced by (Hungary) Réka Luca Jani
- (Ukraine) Marta Kostyuk → replaced by (Bulgaria) Viktoriya Tomova
- (Slovakia) Kristína Kučová → replaced by (Serbia) Olga Danilović
- (France) Kristina Mladenovic → replaced by Anastasia Tikhonova
- (Spain) Nuria Párrizas Díaz → replaced by (Germany) Jule Niemeier
- (Sweden) Rebecca Peterson → replaced by (Georgia (country)) Ekaterine Gorgodze
- (Netherlands) Arantxa Rus → replaced by (Italy) Elisabetta Cocciaretto
- (Egypt) Mayar Sherif → replaced by (Serbia) Aleksandra Krunić
- (Italy) Martina Trevisan → replaced by Elina Avanesyan
- (Belgium) Maryna Zanevska → replaced by (Australia) Astra Sharma
- (China) Zheng Qinwen → replaced by (Austria) Julia Grabher

== Doubles entrants ==
=== Seeds ===
Country	Player	Country	Player	Rank^{1}	Seed
	Anastasia Potapova		Yana Sizikova	184	1
GER	Julia Lohoff	CZE	Renata Voráčová	192	2

- ^{1} Rankings as of 23 May 2022.

== Champions ==
=== Singles ===
- (Germany) Jule Niemeier def. (Italy) Elisabetta Cocciaretto 7–5, 6–1

=== Doubles ===
- (Slovenia) Dalila Jakupović / (Croatia) Tena Lukas def. (Serbia) Olga Danilović / (Serbia) Aleksandra Krunić 5–7, 6–2, [10–5]
