= Ekaterina Ovcharenko =

Russian tennis player (born 2000)

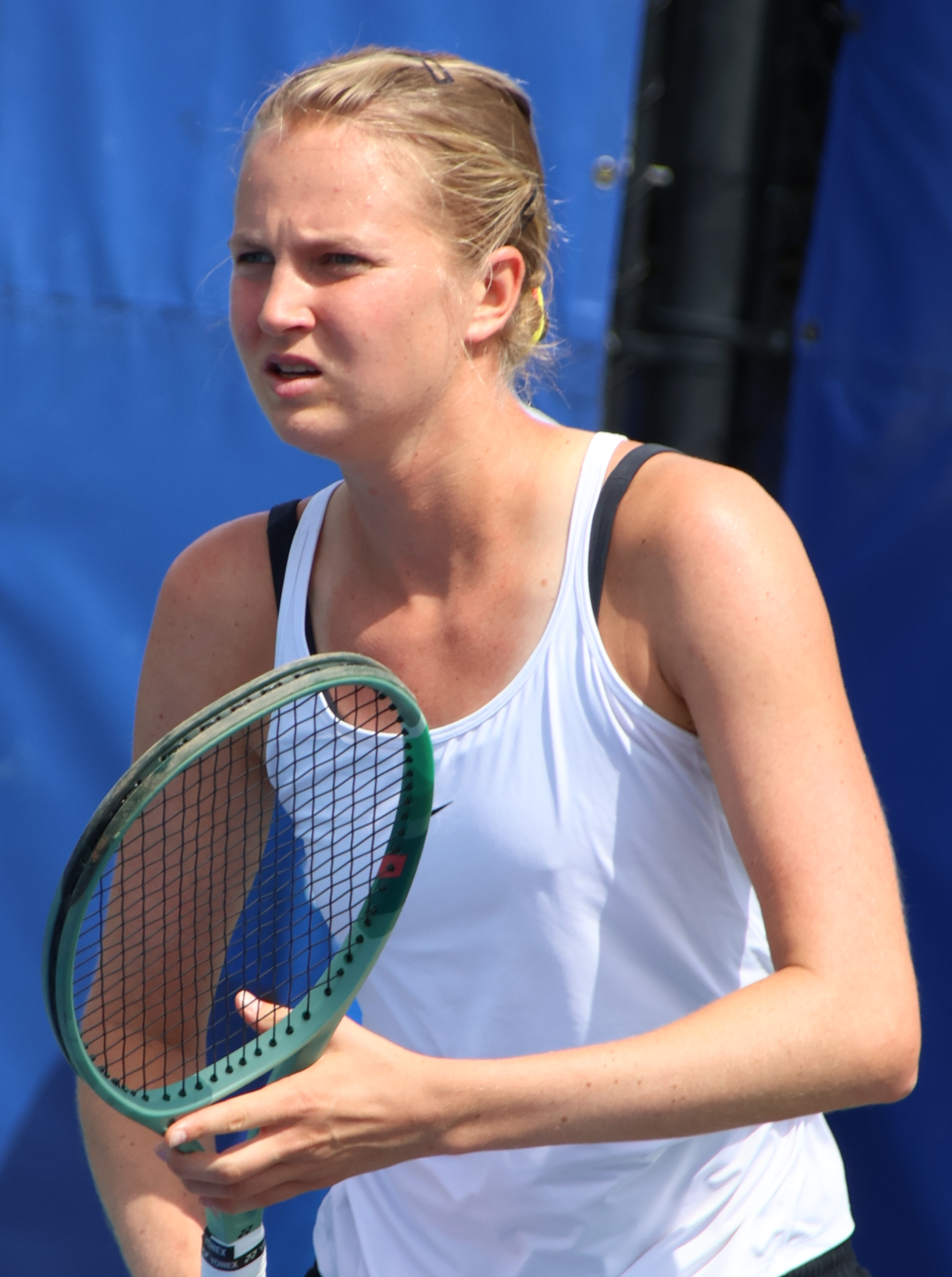
- Ovcharenko in 2026
- Full name: Ekaterina Alexandrovna Ovcharenko
- Country (sports): Russia
- Born: 31 December 2000 (age 25) Moscow, Russia
- Plays: Right-handed
- Prize money: $126,733

Singles
- Career record: 218–259
- Highest ranking: No. 417 (11 August 2025)
- Current ranking: No. 653 (10 August 2026)

Doubles
- Career record: 158–174
- Career titles: 12 ITF
- Highest ranking: No. 125 (22 June 2026)
- Current ranking: No. 128 (10 August 2026)
- Last updated on: 20 August 2026.

Ekaterina Alexandrovna Ovcharenko (Russian: Екатерина Александровна Овчаренко, born 31 December 2000) is a Russian tennis player.

Ovcharenko has a career-high singles ranking by the WTA of 417, reached on 11 August 2025. She also has a career-high doubles ranking of world No. 125, achieved on 22 June 2026.

== Career ==
Ovcharenko won her first major ITF title at the W75 Open Andrézieux-Bouthéon in the doubles draw, partnering Alevtina Ibragimova.

=== 2025: WTA Tour debut ===
Ovcharenko made her WTA Tour main-draw debut at the 2025 Jiangxi Open, in the doubles tournament, partnering with Emily Webley-Smith. They defeated Chinese opponents Hou Yanan and Zhu Chenting in the first round to advance to the quarterfinals. They then defeated French Kristina Mladenovic and Polish Katarzyna Piter in the quarterfinals to advance to the semifinals.

== WTA Tour finals ==
=== Doubles: 1 (runner-up) ===
Legend WTA 500 WTA 250 (0–1)	Finals by surface Hard (0–1) Clay (0–0)

Result	W–L	Date	Tournament	Tier	Surface	Partner	Opponents	Score
Loss	0–1	Nov 2025	Jiangxi Open, China	WTA 250	Hard	(United Kingdom) Emily Webley-Smith	(United States) Quinn Gleason (Russia) Elena Pridankina	4–6, 6–2, [6–10]

== WTA 125 finals ==
=== Doubles: 1 (runner-up) ===
Result	W–L	Date	Tournament	Surface	Partner	Opponents	Score
Loss	0–1	Jun 2026	Makarska Open, Croatia	Clay	(Brazil) Ingrid Martins	(Netherlands) Isabelle Haverlag (Switzerland) Simona Waltert	2–2 ret.

== ITF Circuit finals ==
=== Singles: 2 (2 runner-ups) ===
Legend W15 tournaments (0–2)	Finals by surface Hard (0–2)

Result	W–L	Date	Tournament	Tier	Surface	Opponent	Score
Loss	0–1	Jun 2024	ITF Norges-la-Ville, France	W15	Hard	(Switzerland) Alina Granwehr	7–5, 3–6, 6–7^{(5)}
Loss	0–2	Jul 2024	ITF Bissy-Chambéry, France	W15	Hard	(United Kingdom) Ella McDonald	0–6, 1–6

=== Doubles: 22 (13 titles, 9 runner-ups) ===
Legend W100 tournaments (2–0) W75 tournaments (1–1) W50 tournaments (0–1) W25/35 tournaments (3–4) W15 tournaments (7–3)	Finals by surface Hard (8–5) Clay (4–3) Carpet (1–0)

Result	W–L	Date	Tournament	Tier	Surface	Partner	Opponents	Score
DNP	—N/a	Dec 2018	ITF Antalya, Turkey	W15	Hard	(Russia) Evgenia Burdina	(Latvia) Alise Cernecka (Finland) Oona Orpana	1–6, 1–0 canc. (Note: final cancelled due to bad weather)
Loss	0–1	Oct 2021	ITF Kazan, Russia	W15	Hard	(Russia) Maria Krupenina	(Russia) Ekaterina Maklakova (Russia) Aleksandra Pospelova	1–6, 1–6
Win	1–1	Aug 2022	ITF Bad Waltersdorf, Austria	W15	Clay	(Czech Republic) Zdena Šafářová	(Hungary) Panna Bartha (Romania) Ștefania Bojică	6–1, 6–3
Win	2–1	Nov 2022	ITF Ortisei, Italy	W25	Hard (i)	(Greece) Sapfo Sakellaridi	(Mexico) Maria Fernanda Navarro (United States) Taylor Ng	6–2, 6–4
Win	3–1	Aug 2022	ITF Antalya, Turkey	W15	Clay	(Russia) Daria Lodikova	(United States) Hurricane Tyra Black (United States) Qavia Lopez	6–2, 6–3
Win	4–1	Jan 2023	ITF Antalya, Turkey	W15	Clay	(Russia) Polina Leykina	(United States) Hurricane Tyra Black (Turkey) Doğa Türkmen	6–2, 3–6, [10–4]
Win	5–1	May 2023	ITF Kachreti, Georgia	W25	Hard	(Russia) Maria Kozyreva	Anastasia Zolotareva; Rada Zolotareva	7–5, 6–3
Loss	5–2	Sep 2023	ITF Tauste-Zaragoza, Spain	W25	Hard	(China) Gao Xinyu	(United States) Makenna Jones (United States) Jamie Loeb	2–6, 7–5, [6–10]
Loss	5–3	Aug 2023	ITF Erwitte, Germany	W25	Clay	(Hungary) Amarissa Tóth	(Slovenia) Nika Radišić (Bosnia and Herzegovina) Anita Wagner	5–7, 6–7^{(4)}
Win	6–3	Feb 2024	Open Andrézieux-Bouthéon, France	W75	Hard (i)	Alevtina Ibragimova	(United Kingdom) Emily Appleton (United Kingdom) Freya Christie	3–6, 6–3, [10–5]
Win	7–3	Mar 2024	ITF Antalya, Turkey	W15	Clay	Ekaterina Agureeva	(Bulgaria) Denislava Glushkova; Anastasiia Grechkina	6–0, 7–5
Loss	7–4	Mar 2024	ITF Antalya, Turkey	W15	Clay	(Switzerland) Katerina Tsygourova	Anastasiia Grechkina; Ksenia Laskutova	3–6, 1–6
Win	8–4	Jun 2024	ITF Norges-la-Ville, France	W15	Hard	Kristiana Sidorova	(Switzerland) Alina Granwehr (Republic of Ireland) Celine Simunyu	6–4, 6–3
Win	9–4	Jul 2024	ITF Bissy-Chambéry, France	W15	Hard	Arina Arifullina	(Italy) Viola Turini (Italy) Maria Vittoria Viviani	6–1, 6–1
Loss	9–5	Oct 2024	ITF Reims, France	W35	Hard (i)	(United Kingdom) Emily Webley-Smith	(United Kingdom) Sarah Beth Grey (United Kingdom) Mingge Xu	3–6, 1–6
Loss	9–6	Oct 2024	ITF Cherbourg-en-Cotentin, France	W50	Hard (i)	(France) Tiphanie Lemaître	(Algeria) Inès Ibbou (Switzerland) Naïma Karamoko	6–4, 6–7^{(3)}, [7–10]
Loss	9–7	Dec 2024	ITF Ortisei, Italy	W35	Hard (i)	(United Kingdom) Emily Webley-Smith	(Poland) Weronika Falkowska (Sweden) Lisa Zaar	4–6, 6–1, [10–12]
Win	10–7	Feb 2025	ITF Herrenschwanden, Switzerland	W35	Carpet (i)	(United Kingdom) Emily Webley-Smith	(Georgia (country)) Mariam Bolkvadze (Austria) Sinja Kraus	7–6^{(1)}, 2–6, [11–9]
Loss	10–8	Mar 2025	ITF Antalya, Turkiye	W15	Clay	(United Kingdom) Emily Webley-Smith	(Poland) Daria Kuczer (Romania) Patricia Maria Țig	4–6, 2–6
Win	11–8	Jun 2025	ITF Bissy-Chambéry, France	W15	Hard	(Russia) Ekaterina Yashina	(France) Élise Renard (France) Louna Zoppas	6–2, 6–0
Win	12–8	Mar 2026	Jin'an Open, China	W100	Hard	(Russia) Varvara Panshina	(Indonesia) Priska Madelyn Nugroho (Australia) Alexandra Osborne	6–2, 6–2
Loss	12–9	May 2026	Open Saint-Gaudens, France	W75	Clay	(Brazil) Ingrid Martins	(Sweden) Caijsa Hennemann (Sweden) Lisa Zaar	7–6^{(5)}, 5–7, [7–10]
Win	13–9	Nov 2026	Incheon Open, South Korea	W100	Hard	(Russia) Valeria Savinykh	(Japan) Natsumi Kawaguchi (Japan) Hikaru Sato	7–5, 1–6, [13–11]
