= Ingrid Martins =

Brazilian tennis player (born 1996)

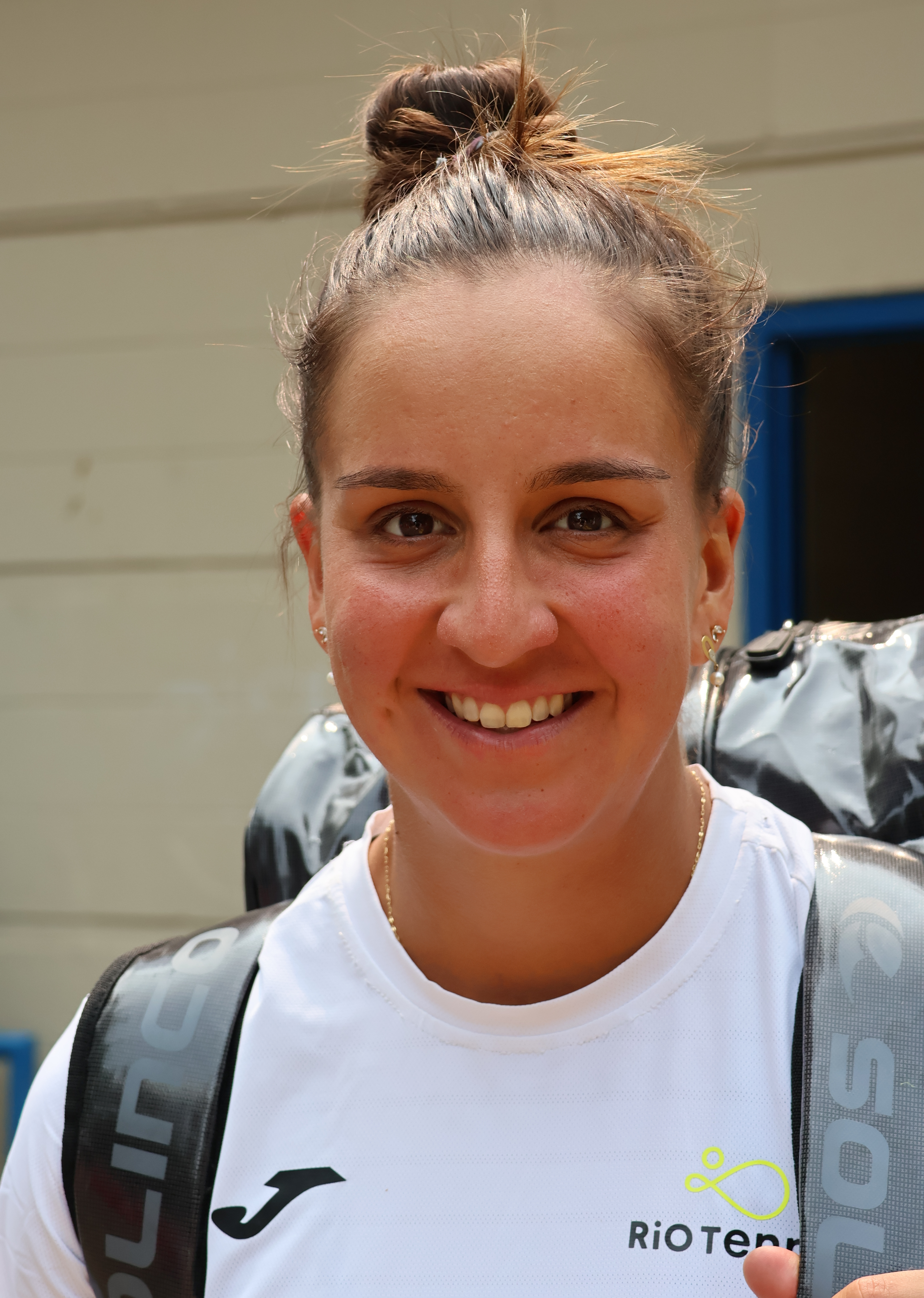
- Martins in 2023
- Full name: Ingrid Gamarra Martins
- Country (sports): Brazil
- Residence: Rio de Janeiro
- Born: 22 August 1996 (age 30) Rio de Janeiro
- Plays: Right (two-handed backhand)
- Prize money: US$ 467,061

Singles
- Career record: 130–110
- Career titles: 0
- Highest ranking: No. 448 (31 January 2022)

Doubles
- Career record: 215–180
- Career titles: 2
- Highest ranking: No. 47 (6 November 2023)
- Current ranking: No. 150 (14 September 2026)

Grand Slam doubles results
- Australian Open: 1R (2024, 2025, 2026)
- French Open: 2R (2023, 2026)
- Wimbledon: 3R (2023)
- US Open: 2R (2025)
Medal record
South American Games
Silver medal – second place	2022 Asunción	Women's doubles
Bronze medal – third place	2022 Asunción	Mixed doubles
- Last updated on: 18 September 2026.

Ingrid Gamarra Martins (born 22 August 1996) is a Brazilian professional tennis player who specializes in doubles. She has a career-high ranking of No. 47 in doubles, attained on 6 November 2023. She also reached a best singles ranking of No. 448 on 31 January 2022. She has won two WTA Tour doubles titles, both at the 250 level.

Martins graduated from the University of South Carolina in 2019, majoring in integrated information technology. As a member of the Gamecocks, she won the 2019 Southeastern Conference tournament, with MVP and Player of the Year honors, ending her college tennis career ranked fourth in the Intercollegiate Tennis Association rankings.

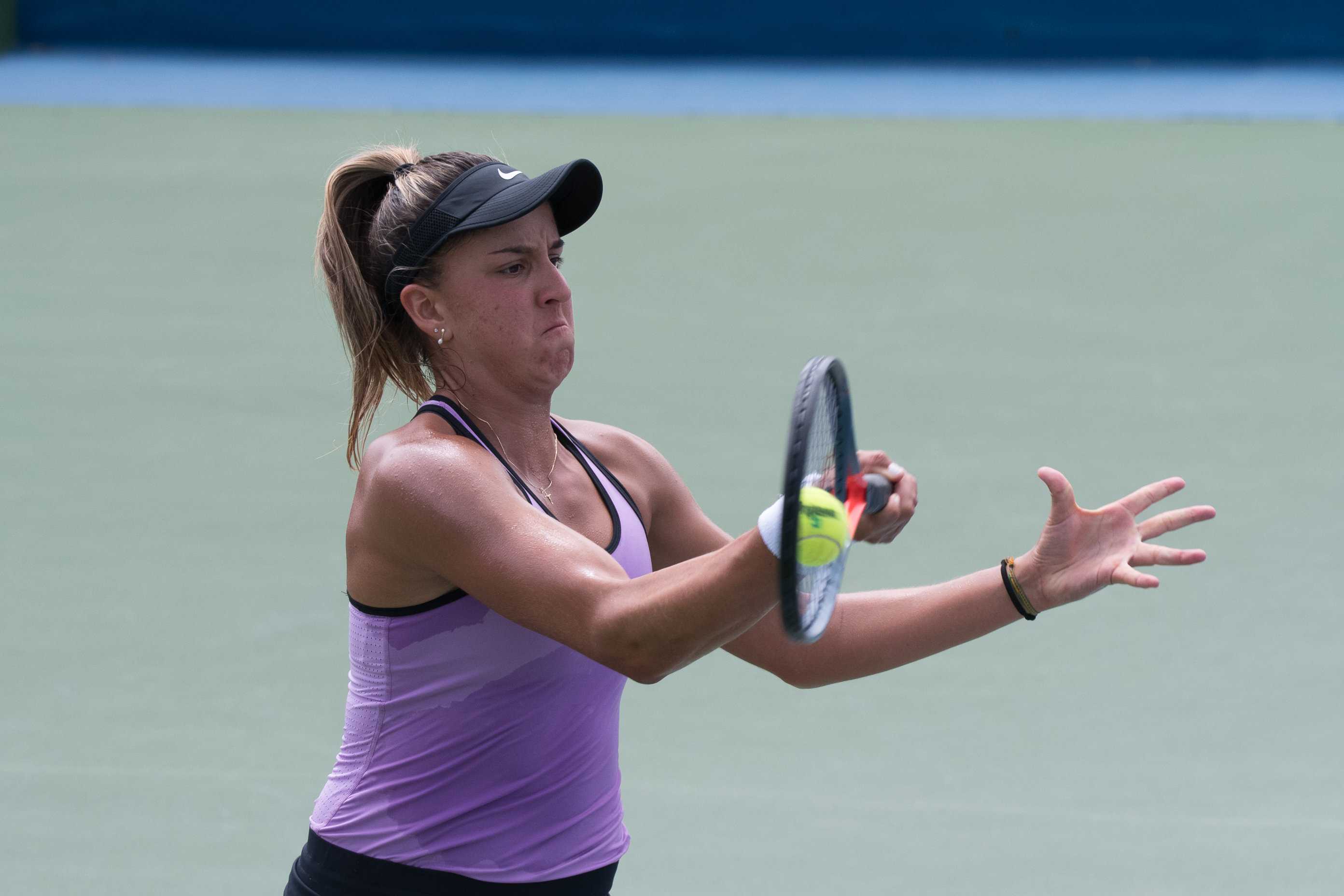
Martins in 2019

== Career ==
=== 2015: WTA Tour debut in doubles ===
Martins made her main-draw debut on the WTA Tour at the 2015 Rio Open, in the doubles event, partnering Carolina Alves.

=== 2022: Top 100 in doubles ===
She first entered the world top 100 in doubles in December 2022. Partnering Luisa Stefani, Martins won her first WTA 125 doubles title at the Montevideo Open, defeating Quinn Gleason and Elixane Lechemia in the final.

=== 2023: First career title – major, WTA 1000 & top 50 debuts ===
Martins won her first WTA Tour-level trophy in Bad Homburg on grass courts with Belarusian Lidziya Marozava. She entered the world top 60 at No. 58 in doubles for the first time on 3 July 2023.

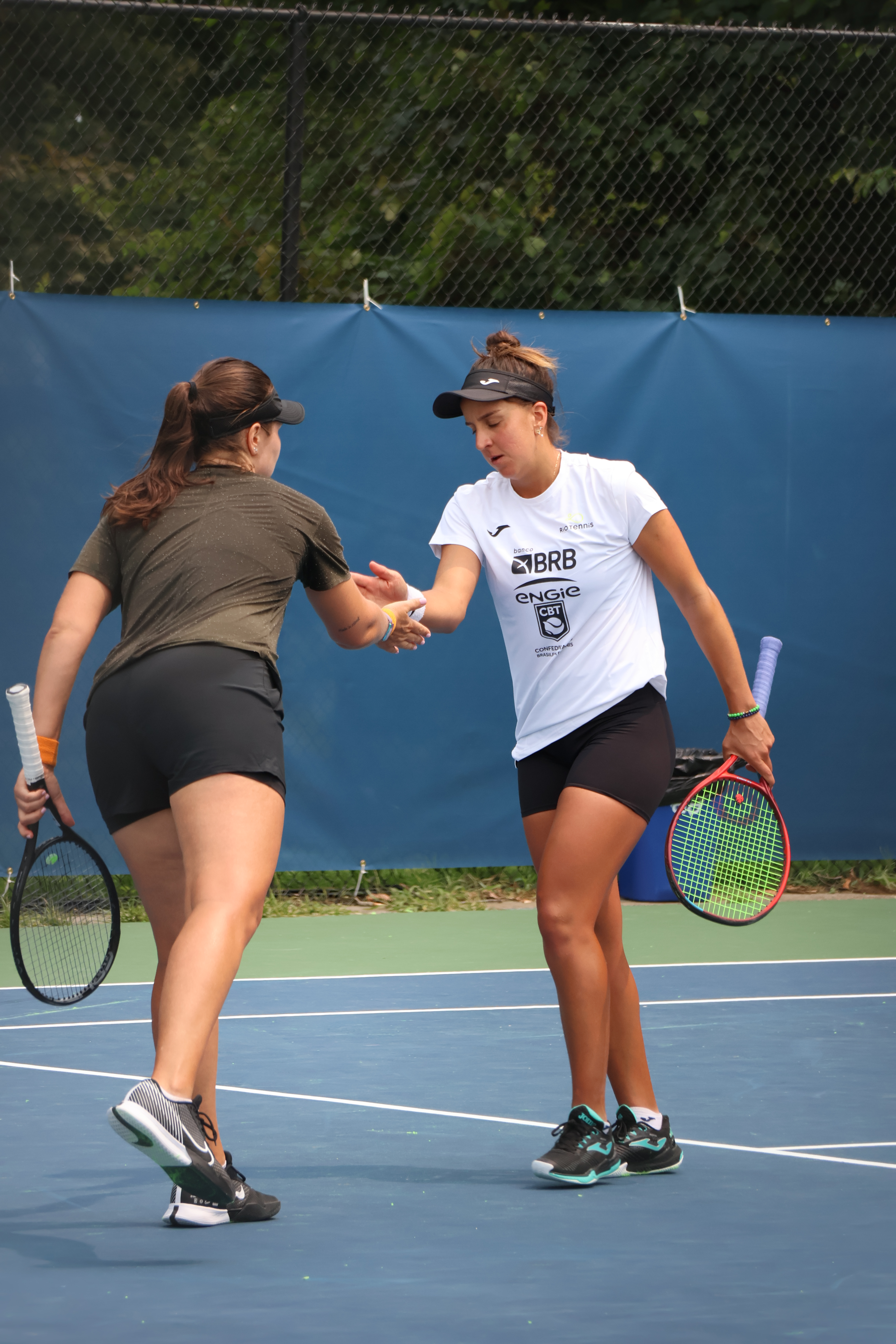
Martins practicing at the 2023 Washington Open alongside Lidziya Marozava

Martins made her major debut at the 2023 French Open, partnering with Iryna Shymanovich as alternate pair, and recorded her first win over Irina-Camelia Begu and Anhelina Kalinina. She made her WTA 1000 debut at the Canadian Open, also playing with Marozava. She reached the semifinals with compatriot Luisa Stefani at the WTA 1000 China Open, defeating en route second seeds Coco Gauff and Jessica Pegula and eighth seeds Laura Siegemund and Vera Zvonareva. With this, she entered the top 50 in doubles for the first time.

In November, Martins played alongside Luisa Stefani in the final match of the four-rubber tie between Team Brazil and South Korea in Brasília, part of the play-offs for the Billie Jean King Cup. Stefani was originally set to pair with Beatriz Haddad Maia, but due to strategic changes, she teamed up with Martins instead. Martins and Stefani faced the South Korean duo of Back Da-yeon and Jeong Bo-young, winning the match in straight sets. It was Martin’s debut match representing Brazil in the BJK Cup. Brazil won the tie without dropping a single match.

In the following weeks, Martins competed in a series of WTA 125 tournaments across South America. In the first, she traveled to Chile for the Colina tournament in the Santiago metropolitan region, but was eliminated in the first round, partnering with fellow Brazilian Laura Pigossi. She then played the inaugural edition of the WTA 125 Florianópolis, which marked the return of WTA tournaments to Brazil after a seven-year absence. Martins was again eliminated in the opening round of the doubles draw, once more playing alongside Pigossi. Following this, she ended her season.

In December, one of Ingrid’s shots from the 2023 season was nominated for the WTA’s Shot of the Year, which is decided by fan voting. The point in question occurred during the first round of the Bad Homburg Open, in which Martins, playing alongside Lidziya Marozava, faced Alexandra Panova and Ulrikke Eikeri. However, the shot did not win the vote.

=== 2024: Second career doubles title ===
Partnering with Quinn Gleason, Martins ended runner-up at the WTA 125 Barranquilla Open in August, losing to Jessica Failla and Hiroko Kuwata in the final.

The following month the pair won the doubles title at the WTA 125 Montreux Ladies Open, defeating María Lourdes Carlé and Simona Waltert in the final which went to a deciding champions tiebreak.

In November, Gleason and Martins claimed the Mérida Open doubles title with a straight sets win over Magali Kempen and Lara Salden in the final. It was the second title on the WTA Tour-level for Martins.

=== 2025: Two WTA 125 doubles titles ===
Martins and Gleason continued their success in 2025, winning two WTA 125 doubles titles, one in June in the city of Grado and the other at the city of Contrexéville in July.

They were also runners-up in another WTA 125, the Open delle Puglie in June.

In September, Martins participated in the first edition of the SP Open, a WTA 250 in São Paulo. Playing alongside Laura Pigossi, she was runner-up, losing in three sets against compatriot Luisa Stefani and Hungarian Timea Babos in the final.

Again partnering with Pigossi, Martins went to play at two WTA 125 tournaments in Brazil in the month of October, first at the first edition of Martins' hometown tournament Rio Ladies Open. Martins and Pigossi reached the semifinals but were defeated by Leyre Romero Gormaz and Tara Würth, in straight sets.

In the next week they played at the 2025 MundoTenis Open in Florianópolis, where they lost in the second round in three sets to Irene Burillo and Ekaterine Gorgodze.

In November, Martins joined the Brazil Billie Jean King Cup team, the Time Brasil BRB, to play at the playoffs of the Billie Jean King Cup against Portugal and Australia, in the hardcourt of the Australian city of Hobart. Martins played in the final match of the tie against Portugal alongside Luisa Stefani. They faced Ines Murta and Angelina Voloshchuk, securing a three set win to help Brazil finish the tie with only wins. Brazil then went to lose against Australia and was knocked back to the zonal group.

=== 2026 ===
At the 2026 Auckland Open, Martins and Pigossi competed in the doubles event. The Brazilian pair lost in the opening round to Isabelle Haverlag and Maia Lumsden in a close match. Martins and Pigossi held a match point during the deciding match tiebreak before their opponents secured victory (12–10).

At the 2026 Australian Open, Martins partnered Filipino player Alexandra Eala in the women's doubles event. The pair were defeated in the first round by the team of Shuko Aoyama and Magda Linette. Martins and Eala had led the opening set 4–0 before their opponents recovered to win the set in a tiebreak. Despite forcing a deciding set by winning the second set, they were unable to advance further in the tournament.

Following her appearance at the Australian Open, Martins was sidelined for several months due to a grade-2 calf injury. She returned to competition in June at the WTA 125 Antalya tournament in Turkey, partnering Greek player Despina Papamichail in the doubles event. The pair were defeated in the first round by Irina Khromacheva and Ksenia Zaytseva, in straight sets.

Martins had initially been entered in a second tournament in Antalya the following week, but chose to leave Turkey amid escalating tensions in the Middle East. In a statement published on social media, she announced her decision to return to Brazil, citing concerns for her safety and health.

At the 2026 Copa Colsanitas, Martins partnered Emily Appleton in the doubles event. They were defeated in the opening round by Emiliana Arango and Panna Udvardy in a match tiebreak, 5–7, 7–5, [7–10].

In April 2026, Martins recorded her first victory of the season at the WTA 125 Saint-Malo tournament in France. Partnering Russian player Ekaterina Ovcharenko, she defeated Elixane Lechemia and Alicia Barnett in the opening round of the doubles competition, 7–5, 3–6, [12–10], advancing to the quarterfinals.

Also in April, Martins competed in the doubles event at the WTA 125 Madrid tournament alongside Czech player Laura Samson. The pair reached the second round, where they were defeated by Oksana Selekhmeteva and Simona Waltert, 3–6, 6–0, [10–4].

In May 2026, Martins finished runner-up in the doubles event at the W75 Open Saint-Gaudens in France, partnering Ekaterina Ovcharenko. The duo advanced to the final, before falling to Lisa Zaar and Caijsa Wilda in three sets. As a result, Martins moved up to world No. 82 in the WTA doubles rankings.

At the 2026 French Open, Martins partnered Argentine Solana Sierra in the doubles competition. The pair defeated Harriet Dart and Alexandra Panova in straight sets to advance to the second round. The victory marked Martins' first main-draw win at Roland Garros and equaled her best result at the tournament, having also reached the second round in 2023 with Irina Shymanovich.

They were subsequently then eliminated by Magali Kempen and Andreja Klepač.

In June 2026, Martins was named to the University of South Carolina Athletics Hall of Fame as a member of its 2026 induction class. She competed for the South Carolina Gamecocks women’s tennis team from 2015 to 2019 and holds several program records, including wins by a freshman, junior, and senior player. During her senior season in 2019, she earned ITA All-American honors in both singles and doubles and was named the ITA Senior National Player of the Year, SEC Player of the Year, and SEC Tournament MVP. She also received First Team All-SEC and South Carolina Scholar-Athlete of the Year honors. Martins was a four-time ITA Scholar-Athlete and four-time member of the SEC Academic Honor Roll. She finished the 2019 season ranked No. 4 nationally in singles and No. 1 in doubles, the highest final rankings in program history, and holds several school records, including wins by a freshman, junior, and senior player.

== WTA Tour finals ==
=== Doubles: 4 (2 titles, 2 runner-ups) ===
Legend WTA 1000 WTA 500 WTA 250 (2–2)	Finals by surface Hard (1–1) Clay (0–1) Grass (1–0)	Finals by setting Outdoors (2–2)

Result	W–L	Date	Tournament	Tier	Surface	Partner	Opponents	Score
Loss	0–1	May 2023	Rabat Grand Prix, Morocco	WTA 250	Clay	Lidziya Marozava	(United States) Sabrina Santamaria; Yana Sizikova	6–3, 1–6, [8–10]
Win	1–1	Jun 2023	Bad Homburg Open, Germany	WTA 250	Grass	Lidziya Marozava	(Japan) Eri Hozumi (Romania) Monica Niculescu	6–0, 7–6^{(3)}
Win	2–1	Nov 2024	Mérida Open, Mexico	WTA 250	Hard	(United States) Quinn Gleason	(Belgium) Magali Kempen (Belgium) Lara Salden	6–4, 6–4
Loss	2–2	Sep 2025	SP Open, Brazil	WTA 250	Hard	(Brazil) Laura Pigossi	(Hungary) Tímea Babos (Brazil) Luisa Stefani	6–4, 3–6, [4–10]

== WTA 125 finals ==
=== Doubles: 8 (4 titles, 4 runner-ups) ===
Result	W–L	Date	Tournament	Surface	Partner	Opponents	Score
Win	1–0	Nov 2022	Montevideo Open, Uruguay	Clay	(Brazil) Luisa Stefani	(United States) Quinn Gleason (France) Elixane Lechemia	7–5, 6–7^{(6)}, [10–6]
Loss	1–1	May 2024	Parma Open, Italy	Clay	(France) Elixane Lechemia	(Kazakhstan) Anna Danilina (Russia) Irina Khromacheva	1–6, 2–6
Loss	1–2	Aug 2024	Barranquilla Open, Colombia	Hard	(United States) Quinn Gleason	(United States) Jessica Failla (Japan) Hiroko Kuwata	6–4, 6–7^{(2)}, [7–10]
Win	2–2	Sep 2024	Montreux Ladies Open, Switzerland	Clay	(United States) Quinn Gleason	(Argentina) María Carlé (Switzerland) Simona Waltert	6–3, 4–6, [10–7]
Loss	2–3	Jun 2025	Bari Open, Italy	Clay	(United States) Quinn Gleason	(Russia) Maria Kozyreva (Belarus) Iryna Shymanovich	6–3, 4–6, [7–10]
Win	3–3	Jun 2025	Grado Tennis Cup, Italy	Clay	(United States) Quinn Gleason	(Slovenia) Veronika Erjavec (Czech Republic) Dominika Šalková	6–2, 5–7, [10–5]
Win	4–3	Jul 2025	Contrexéville Open, France	Clay	(United States) Quinn Gleason	(United Kingdom) Emily Appleton (Netherlands) Isabelle Haverlag	6–1, 7–6^{(4)}
Loss	4–4	Jun 2026	Makarska Open, Croatia	Clay	Ekaterina Ovcharenko	(Netherlands) Isabelle Haverlag (Switzerland) Simona Waltert	2–2 ret.

== ITF Circuit finals ==
=== Singles: 7 (4 titles, 3 runner-ups) ===
Legend $25,000 tournaments $10/15,000 tournaments (4–3)	Finals by surface Hard (4–2) Clay (0–1)

Result	W–L	Date	Tournament	Tier	Surface	Opponent	Score
Loss	0–1	Oct 2016	ITF Charleston, United States	10,000	Clay	(United States) Nicole Coopersmith	3–6, 4–6
Win	1–1	Jul 2019	ITF Cancún, Mexico	15,000	Hard	(Brazil) Thaisa Grana Pedretti	7–6^{(3)}, 7–6^{(4)}
Win	2–1	Aug 2019	ITF Cancún, Mexico	15,000	Hard	(United Kingdom) Emilie Lindh	6–1, 6–3
Win	3–1	Jan 2020	ITF Cancún, Mexico	15,000	Hard	(United States) Taylor Ng	6–3, 6–2
Win	4–1	Feb 2020	ITF Cancún, Mexico	15,000	Hard	(Italy) Verena Meliss	6–7^{(4)}, 7–5, 6–4
Loss	4–2	Sep 2020	ITF Porto, Portugal	15,000	Hard	(Brazil) Beatriz Haddad Maia	3–6, 2–6
Loss	4–3	Sep 2021	ITF Monastir, Tunisia	15,000	Hard	(Japan) Moyuka Uchijima	1–6, 4–6

=== Doubles: 24 (11 titles, 13 runner-ups) ===
Legend $100,000 tournaments (0–2) $60,000 tournaments (2–1) $25,000 tournaments (2–4) $10/15,000 tournaments (7–6)	Finals by surface Hard (7–8) Clay (4–4) Carpet (0–1)

Result	W–L	Date	Tournament	Tier	Surface	Partner	Opponents	Score
Loss	0–1	Apr 2014	ITF Rio Preto, Brazil	10,000	Clay	(Brazil) Carolina Alves	(Brazil) Maria Fernanda Alves (Brazil) Paula Cristina Gonçalves	2–6, 0–6
Loss	0–2	Jun 2014	ITF Villa María, Argentina	10,000	Clay	(Brazil) Eduarda Piai	(Argentina) Sofía Luini (Argentina) Ana Madcur	2–6, 6–4, [7–10]
Loss	0–3	Jul 2014	ITF Campos do Jordão, Brazil	15,000	Hard	(Brazil) Carolina Alves	(Brazil) Nathaly Kurata (Brazil) Giovanna Tomita	3–6, 2–6
Win	1–3	Mar 2015	ITF Ribeirão Preto, Brazil	10,000	Clay	(Ukraine) Valeriya Strakhova	(Argentina) Melina Ferrero (Argentina) Carla Lucero	6–0, 6–3
Win	2–3	Jul 2016	ITF Campos do Jordão	25,000	Hard	(Brazil) Laura Pigossi	(Brazil) Maria-Fernanda Alves (Brazil) Luisa Stefani	6–3, 3–6, [10–8]
Win	3–3	Jul 2017	ITF Campos do Jordão	15,000	Hard	(Paraguay) Camila Giangreco Campiz	(Brazil) Nathaly Kurata (Brazil) Rebeca Pereira	6–3, 7–6^{(1)}
Loss	3–4	Jul 2019	ITF Cancún, Mexico	15,000	Hard	(Brazil) Eduarda Piai	(United States) Hind Abdelouahid (Russia) Maria Kozyreva	6–7^{(0)}, 4–6
Win	4–4	Jul 2019	ITF Cancún, Mexico	15,000	Hard	(Brazil) Eduarda Piai	(United States) Angela Kulikov (United States) Rianna Valdes	6–7^{(1)}, 7–5, [11–9]
Win	5–4	Feb 2020	ITF Cancún, Mexico	15,000	Hard	(Brazil) Thaisa Grana Pedretti	(Bulgaria) Eleonore Tchakarova (Bulgaria) Verginie Tchakarova	6–2, 6–2
Win	6–4	Sep 2020	ITF Figueira da Foz, Portugal	25,000	Hard	(Brazil) Beatriz Haddad Maia	(Sweden) Jacqueline Cabaj Awad (Portugal) Inês Murta	7–5, 6–1
Loss	6–5	Oct 2020	ITF Funchal, Portugal	15,000	Hard	(Brazil) Beatriz Haddad Maia	(Netherlands) Arianne Hartono (Netherlands) Eva Vedder	6–4, 1–6, [7–10]
Win	7–5	Mar 2021	ITF Antalya, Turkey	15,000	Clay	(United States) Jessie Aney	(South Korea) Jang Su-jeong (South Korea) Park So-hyun	6–2, 6–2
Loss	7–6	Jul 2021	ITF Lisbon, Portugal	25,000	Hard	(China) Ma Shuyue	(South Korea) Han Na-lae (Japan) Momoko Kobori	3–6, 1–6
Win	8–6	Jul 2021	ITF Almada, Portugal	15,000	Hard	(Spain) Olga Parres Azcoitia	(France) Océane Babel (France) Lucie Nguyen Tan	4–6, 6–3, [10–8]
Win	9–6	Aug 2021	ITF Monastir, Tunisia	15,000	Hard	(Argentina) Jazmín Ortenzi	(Japan) Sakura Hondo (Japan) Yuka Hosoki	6–2, 6–0
Loss	9–7	Sep 2021	ITF Monastir, Tunisia	15,000	Hard	(Argentina) Jazmín Ortenzi	(China) Ma Yexin (Japan) Moyuka Uchijima	2–6, 6–2, [6–10]
Loss	9–8	Jan 2022	ITF Florianópolis, Brazil	25,000	Hard	(United States) Jessie Aney	(Venezuela) Andrea Gámiz (United States) Sofia Sewing	6–7^{(2)}, 4–6
Loss	9–9	May 2022	ITF Osijek, Croatia	25,000	Clay	(United States) Jessie Aney	(Japan) Mana Kawamura (Japan) Funa Kozaki	3–6, 6–2, [8–10]
Loss	9–10	Jun 2022	ITF Cantanhede, Portugal	25,000	Carpet	(United Kingdom) Emily Webley-Smith	(Indonesia) Jessy Rompies (Australia) Olivia Tjandramulia	2–6, 6–7^{(1)}
Win	10–10	Dec 2022	Aberto da República, Brazil	60,000	Clay	(Portugal) Francisca Jorge	(United States) Anna Rogers (United States) Christina Rosca	6–4, 6–3
Win	11–10	Apr 2023	Oeiras Open, Portugal	60,000	Clay	(Mexico) Fernanda Contreras	(Czech Republic) Jesika Malečková (Czech Republic) Renata Voráčová	6–3, 6–2
Loss	11–11	Oct 2024	Tennis Classic of Macon, United States	W100	Hard	(United States) Quinn Gleason	(United States) Sophie Chang (Poland) Katarzyna Kawa	5–7, 4–6
Loss	11–12	Aug 2025	Landisville Tennis Challenge, United States	W100	Hard	(Sweden) Simona Waltert	(United States) Carmen Corley (United States) Ivana Corley	6–4, 6–7^{(4–7)}, [10–12]
Loss	11–13	May 2026	Open Saint-Gaudens, France	W75	Clay	Ekaterina Ovcharenko	(Sweden) Caijsa Hennemann (Sweden) Lisa Zaar	7–6^{(7–5)}, 5–7, [7–10]

== Awards and Honors ==
2026

- Inducted into the University of South Carolina Athletics Hall of Fame (Class of 2026)
