= Aya El Aouni =

Moroccan tennis player (born 2005)

- Country (sports): Morocco
- Born: 6 July 2005 (age 21)
- Plays: Right-handed (two-handed backhand)
- Prize money: $35,934

Singles
- Career record: 79–44
- Career titles: 3 ITF
- Highest ranking: No. 598 (27 January 2025)

Doubles
- Career record: 43–27
- Career titles: 2 ITF
- Highest ranking: No. 461 (26 May 2025)
- Current ranking: No. 1283 (13 July 2026)

Team competitions
- BJK Cup: 14–6
- Last updated on: 16 July 2026.

Aya El Aouni (born 6 July 2005) is a Moroccan tennis player.

El Aouni has a career-high singles ranking by the WTA of 598, achieved on 27 January 2025. She also has a career-high WTA doubles ranking of 461, achieved on 26 May 2025.

Her idols are Tunisian Ons Jabeur and Belarusian Aryna Sabalenka. One of her biggest goals is to compete in the Olympics.

== Career ==
Aouni made her WTA Tour main-draw debut at the 2023 Morocco Open, where she received entry into the wildcard, losing in the first round to sixth seed Yulia Putintseva, in straight sets.

In 2023, she won her first singles championship in Heraklion, Greece.

In 2024, she won her second singles title in Antalya, Turkey.

== ITF Circuit finals ==
=== Singles: 5 (3 titles, 2 runner-up) ===
Legend W15 tournaments	Finals by surface Clay (3–2)

Result	W–L	Date	Tournament	Tier	Surface	Opponent	Score
Win	1–0	Oct 2023	ITF Heraklion, Greece	W15	Clay	(Spain) Claudia Hoste Ferrer	2–6, 6–4, 6–3
Loss	1–1	Dec 2023	ITF Antalya, Turkey	W15	Clay	(Serbia) Natalija Senić	1–5 ret.
Win	2–1	May 2024	ITF Antalya, Turkey	W15	Clay	Valeriya Yushchenko	2–6, 7–6 5, 6–3
Win	3–1	May 2024	ITF Antalya, Turkey	W15	Clay	Valeriya Yushchenko	6–2, 2–0 ret.
Loss	3–2	Nov 2026	ITF Hilton Head Island, USA	W15	Clay	(United States) Ashley Lahey	2–6, 6–4, 3–6

=== Doubles: 8 (2 titles, 6 runner-ups) ===
Legend W35 tournaments W15 tournaments	Finals by surface Hard (0–2) Clay (2–4)

Result	W–L	Date	Tournament	Tier	Surface	Partner	Opponents	Score
Win	1–0	Nov 2023	ITF Antalya, Turkey	W15	Clay	(Italy) Francesca Pace	(Japan) Mayuka Aikawa (Japan) Haine Ogata	6–0, 6–4
Loss	1–1	Mar 2024	ITF Monastir, Tunisia	W15	Hard	(Netherlands) Warda Ait el Bachir	(United States) Mayra Jovic (Italy) Valentina Losciale	2–6, 3–6
Loss	1–2	Mar 2024	ITF Antalya, Turkey	W15	Clay	(Switzerland) Alina Granwehr	(Germany) Natalia Siedliska (Slovakia) Radka Zelníčková	2–6, 2–6
Loss	1–3	May 2024	ITF Antalya, Turkey	W15	Clay	(Italy) Francesca Pace	(Bulgaria) Dia Evtimova (Italy) Verena Meliss	4–6, 6–7^{(2)}
Win	2–3	Jul 2024	ITF Casablanca, Morocco	W35	Clay	(Morocco) Malak El Allami	(Switzerland) Chelsea Fontenel (Egypt) Sandra Samir	6–2, 6–2
Loss	2–4	Nov 2024	ITF Miami, United States	W35	Hard	(Poland) Olivia Lincer	(Canada) Kayla Cross (United States) Anna Rogers	5–7, 4–6
Loss	2–5	Jun 2026	ITF Casablanca, Morocco	W15	Clay	(Morocco) Diae El Jardi	(France) Sarah Iliev (France) Emma Léné	4–6, 2–6
Loss	2–6	Nov 2026	ITF Hilton Head Island, USA	W15	Clay	(United States) Yael Saffar	(France) Ava Catanzarite (United States) Kate Sharabura	6–1, 4–6, [9–11]
