= 2026 Makarska Open =

- Date: 2–7 June
- Edition: 20th
- Category: WTA 125
- Prize money: $115,000
- Surface: Clay
- Location: Makarska, Croatia
- Venue: Tennis Center Makarska

Champions

Singles
- (Uzbekistan) Maria Timofeeva

Doubles
- (Netherlands) Isabelle Haverlag / (Switzerland) Simona Waltert
- Makarska International Championships

The 2026 Makarska Open was a professional women's tennis tournament played on outdoor clay courts. It was the 20th edition of the tournament and part of the 2026 WTA 125 tournaments. The event took place from 2 to 7 June 2026 at the Tennis Center in Makarska, Croatia.

== Singles main draw entrants ==
=== Seeds ===
| Country | Player | Rank^{1} | Seed |
|---|---|---|---|
| CRO | Petra Marčinko | 51 | 1 |
| AUS | Maya Joint | 52 | 2 |
| SUI | Simona Waltert | 91 | 3 |
| AND | Victoria Jiménez Kasintseva | 104 | 4 |
| LAT | Darja Semeņistaja | 110 | 5 |
| CZE | Dominika Šalková | 113 | 6 |
| UZB | Maria Timofeeva | 118 | 7 |
| FRA | Léolia Jeanjean | 122 | 8 |

- ^{1} Rankings as of 25 May 2025.

=== Other entrants ===
The following players received a wildcard into the singles main draw:

- (Croatia) Lucija Ćirić Bagarić
- (Croatia) Ana Konjuh
- (Croatia) Tena Lukas
- (Croatia) Petra Marčinko

The following player received entry using a protected ranking:

- (United States) Robin Montgomery

The following players received entry from the qualifying draw:

- Erika Andreeva
- (Croatia) Lea Bošković
- (Sweden) Caijsa Hennemann
- (Morocco) Yasmine Kabbaj

The following players received entry as a lucky loser:

- (Armenia) Elina Avanesyan
- (United States) Akasha Urhobo

=== Withdrawals ===
- (Spain) Marina Bassols Ribera → replaced by (Armenia) Elina Avanesyan (LL)
- (Hungary) Anna Bondár → replaced by (Romania) Miriam Bulgaru
- (France) Clara Burel → replaced by (Serbia) Mia Ristić
- (Hungary) Dalma Gálfi → replaced by (United States) Akasha Urhobo (LL)
- (Austria) Sinja Kraus → replaced by (Sweden) Kajsa Rinaldo Persson
- (Germany) Eva Lys → replaced by (Spain) Sara Sorribes Tormo
- (Ukraine) Oleksandra Oliynykova → replaced by (Czech Republic) Barbora Palicová
- (China) Wang Xiyu → replaced by (Czech Republic) Lucie Havlíčková

== Doubles entrants ==
=== Seeds ===
| Country | Player | Country | Player | Rank^{1} | Seed |
|---|---|---|---|---|---|
| AUS | Maya Joint | SVK | Rebecca Šramková | 153 | 1 |
| NED | Isabelle Haverlag | SUI | Simona Waltert | 190 | 2 |

- ^{1} Rankings as of 25 May 2026.

=== Other entrants ===
The following pair received a wildcard into the doubles main draw:

- (Spain) Andrea Lázaro García / (Croatia) Tena Lukas

=== Retirements ===
- (Brazil) Ingrid Martins / Ekaterina Ovcharenko (Martins - back injury)

== Champions ==
=== Singles ===
- (Uzbekistan) Maria Timofeeva def. (Latvia) Darja Semeņistaja 6–2, 6–3.

=== Doubles ===
- (Netherlands) Isabelle Haverlag / (Switzerland) Simona Waltert def. (Brazil) Ingrid Martins / Ekaterina Ovcharenko 2–2 ret.
