= Makarska International Championships =

1998 WTA tennis tournament in Croatia

WTA 125K series
- Event name: Makarska Open hosted by Valamar
- Tour: WTA Tour
- Founded: 1998
- Location: Makarska, Croatia
- Venue: Tennis Center Makarska
- Category: WTA 125
- Surface: Clay - outdoors
- Draw: 32S / 8D
- Prize money: US$115,000 (2026)
- Website: makarskaopen.com

Current champions (2026)
- Singles: (Uzbekistan) Maria Timofeeva
- Doubles: (Netherlands) Isabelle Haverlag (Switzerland) Simona Waltert

The Makarska International Championships is a WTA 125-level women's tennis tournament. It takes place on outdoor clay courts, during the second week of French Open at the Tennis Center in the city of Makarska, Croatia. The tournament was held in 1998 as WTA Tier IV level event. In 2022, the tournament made a comeback as a WTA 125 level event as a replacement for the Bol Open.

== Results ==
=== Singles ===
Year	Champion	Runner-up	Score
↓ WTA Tier-IV event ↓
1998	(Czech Republic) Květa Hrdličková	(China) Li Fang	6–3, 6–1
1999–2021	Not held		
↓ WTA 125 event ↓
2022	(Germany) Jule Niemeier	(Italy) Elisabetta Cocciaretto	7–5, 6–1
2023	(Egypt) Mayar Sherif	(Italy) Jasmine Paolini	2–6, 7–6^{(8–6)}, 7–5
2024	(United States) Katie Volynets	(Egypt) Mayar Sherif	3–6, 6–2, 6–1
2025	(Czech Republic) Sára Bejlek	(Andorra) Victoria Jiménez Kasintseva	6–0, 6–1
2026	(Uzbekistan) Maria Timofeeva	(Latvia) Darja Semeņistaja	6–2, 6–3

=== Doubles ===
Year	Champions	Runners-up	Score
↓ WTA Tier IV event ↓
1998	(Slovenia) Tina Križan (Slovenia) Katarina Srebotnik	(Austria) Karin Kschwendt (Russia) Evgenia Kulikovskaya	7–6^{(7–3)}, 6–1
1999–2021	not held		
↓ WTA 125 event ↓
2022	(Slovenia) Dalila Jakupović (Croatia) Tena Lukas	(Serbia) Olga Danilović (Serbia) Aleksandra Krunić	5–7, 6–2, [10–5]
2023	(Estonia) Ingrid Neel (Chinese Taipei) Wu Fang-hsien	(Czech Republic) Anna Sisková (Czech Republic) Renata Voráčová	6–3, 7–5
2024	(United States) Sabrina Santamaria; Iryna Shymanovich	(Japan) Nao Hibino (Georgia (country)) Oksana Kalashnikova	6–4, 3–6, [10–6]
2025	(Czech Republic) Jesika Malečková (Czech Republic) Miriam Škoch	(Georgia (country)) Oksana Kalashnikova; Elena Pridankina	2–6, 6–3, [10–4]
2026	(Netherlands) Isabelle Haverlag (Switzerland) Simona Waltert	(Brazil) Ingrid Martins; Ekaterina Ovcharenko	2–2 ret.

== See also ==
- Bol Open
- Croatia Open Umag
