= Sabrina Santamaria =

American tennis player (born 1993)

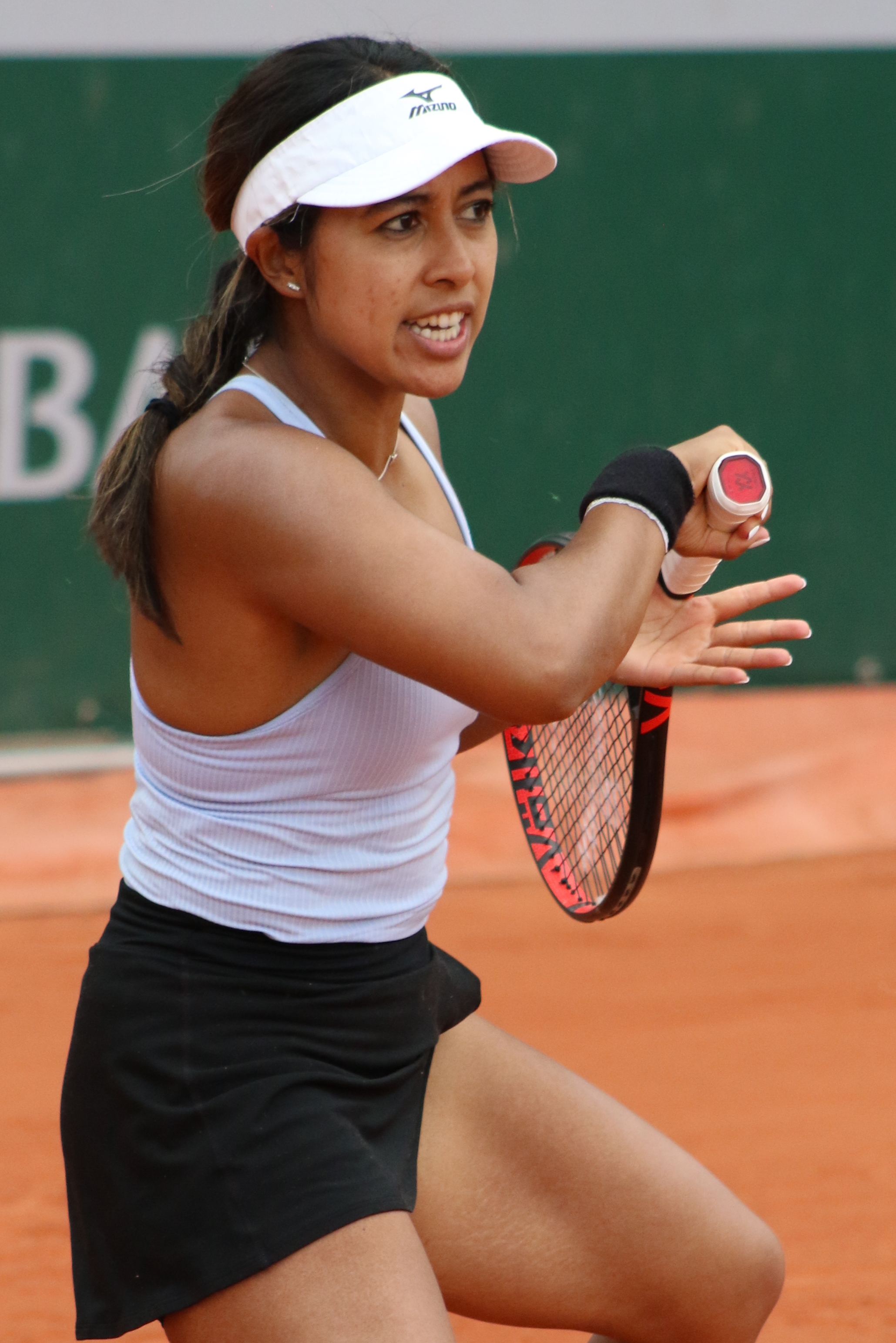
- Santamaria at the 2021 French Open
- Full name: Sabrina Ashley Vida Santamaria
- Country (sports): United States
- Residence: Los Angeles, California
- Born: February 24, 1993 (age 33) Los Angeles, California
- Height: 5 ft 2 in (1.57 m)
- Plays: Right (two-handed backhand)
- College: USC Trojans
- Prize money: $829,578

Singles
- Career record: 132–85
- Career titles: 2 ITF
- Highest ranking: No. 384 (June 20, 2016)

Doubles
- Career record: 249–259
- Career titles: 4 WTA
- Highest ranking: No. 52 (March 30, 2026)
- Current ranking: No. 99 (September 28, 2026)

Grand Slam doubles results
- Australian Open: 2R (2019, 2020, 2023, 2025, 2026)
- French Open: 2R (2019, 2020, 2025)
- Wimbledon: 2R (2021, 2022)
- US Open: 2R (2018, 2019, 2021, 2022)

Grand Slam mixed doubles results
- Wimbledon: 1R (2021)
- US Open: 1R (2013, 2021)
- Last updated on: September 30, 2026.

Sabrina Ashley Vida Santamaria (born February 24, 1993) is an American tennis player who specializes in doubles. She has a career-high doubles ranking of No. 52, achieved on 30 March 2026 and a best singles ranking of No. 384, achieved in June 2016.

== College ==
Santamaria graduated from the University of Southern California in 2015 with a degree in International Relations. During her collegiate career, she was the 2013 NCAA Doubles Champion alongside Kaitlyn Christian. A 5-time All-American, she was the 2013 Pac-12 Player of the Year and Doubles Team of the Year and achieved a No. 1 national ranking in doubles. She was also the 2013 World University Games silver medalist in singles in Kazan, Russia.

== Professional ==
Partnering Kaitlyn Christian, Santamaria won her first WTA 125 doubles title at the 2021 Open de Saint-Malo, defeating Hayley Carter and Luisa Stefani in the final.

She claimed her maiden WTA 250 doubles crown at the 2022 Monterrey Open, playing with Catherine Harrison and overcoming Han Xinyun and Yana Sizikova in the final.

Alongside Sizikova, Santamaria won the doubles at the 2023 Morocco Open with a win in the final against Lidziya Marozava and Ingrid Martins.

Partnering with Dalila Jakupović, she won another doubles title at the WTA 125 2024 Mumbai Open, defeating Arianne Hartono and Prarthana Thombare in the final. At the WTA 125 Makarska International Championships, Santamaria and Iryna Shymanovich overcame Nao Hibino and Oksana Kalashnikova in a deciding champions tiebreak to win the doubles final and take the title.

Partnering Aleksandra Krunić, Santamaria finished runner-up in the doubles at the 2025 Auckland Open, losing the final to Jiang Xinyu and Wu Fang-hsien. In April 2025, again alongside Krunić, she won the doubles title at the Rouen Open, defeating top seeds Irina Khromacheva and Linda Nosková in the final.

Teaming up with Anastasia Dețiuc, Santamaria won the doubles title at the 2026 Ostrava Open, overcoming wildcard entrants Lucie Havlíčková and Dominika Šalková in the final.

== Personal life ==
Santamaria was born in the United States to a Panamanian father and Filipina mother. She announced that she was pregnant with her first child in August 2026.

== Performance timeline ==
Key
W	F	SF	QF	#R	RR	Q#	DNQ	A	NH

(W) winner; (F) finalist; (SF) semifinalist; (QF) quarterfinalist; (#R) rounds 4, 3, 2, 1; (RR) round-robin stage; (Q#) qualification round; (DNQ) did not qualify; (A) absent; (NH) not held; (SR) strike rate (events won / competed); (W–L) win–loss record.
To avoid confusion and double counting, these charts are updated at the conclusion of a tournament or when the player's participation has ended.

=== Doubles ===
Tournament	2015	2016	2017	2018	2019	2020	2021	2022	2023	2024	2025	2026	SR	W–L	Win %
Grand Slam tournaments
Australian Open	A	A	A	A	2R	2R	1R	1R	2R	1R	2R	2R	0 / 8	5–8	38%
French Open	A	A	A	A	2R	2R	1R	1R	1R	1R	2R	A	0 / 6	2–6	25%
Wimbledon	A	A	A	Q1	1R	NH	2R	2R	1R	A	1R	A	0 / 4	2–4	33%
US Open	1R	A	A	2R	2R	1R	2R	2R	1R	A	1R	A	0 / 7	4–7	36%
Win–loss	0–1	0–0	0–0	1–1	3–4	2–3	2–4	2–4	1–4	0–2	2–4	1–1	0 / 26	14–26	35%
WTA 1000
Qatar Open (Note: The first Premier 5 event of the year has switched back and forth between the Dubai Tennis Championships and the Qatar Ladies Open since 2009. Dubai was classified as a Premier 5 event from 2009 to 2011 before being succeeded by Doha for the 2012–2014 period. In 2015, Dubai regained its Premier 5 status while Doha was demoted to Premier status. The Premier 5 tournaments were reclassified as WTA 1000 tournaments in 2021.)	NMS	A	NMS	A	NMS	A	NMS	A	NMS	A	A	A	0 / 0	0–0	–
Dubai Open	A	NMS	A	NMS	1R	NMS	1R	NMS	A	A	A	A	0 / 2	0–2	0%
Indian Wells Open	A	A	A	A	1R	NH	QF	1R	A	A	A	A	0 / 3	2–3	40%
Miami Open	A	A	A	A	1R	NH	A	1R	A	A	A	A	0 / 2	0–2	0%
Madrid Open	A	A	A	A	A	NH	1R	1R	A	A	A	A	0 / 2	0–2	0%
Italian Open	A	A	A	A	A	2R	A	1R	A	A	A	A	0 / 2	1–2	33%
Canadian Open	A	A	A	A	2R	NH	A	A	1R	A	1R	A	0 / 3	1–3	25%
Cincinnati Open	A	A	A	SF	A	1R	1R	A	A	A	A	A	0 / 3	3–3	50%
China Open	A	A	A	1R	A	NH			A	A	A	A	0 / 1	0–1	0%
Wuhan Open	A	A	A	2R	A	NH				A	A		0 / 1	1–1	50%
Win–loss	0–0	0–0	0–0	4–3	1–4	1–2	2–4	0–4	0–1	0–0	0–1		0 / 19	8–19	30%

== WTA Tour finals ==
=== Doubles: 10 (4 titles, 6 runner-ups) ===
Legend WTA 500 (0–1) WTA 250 (4–5)	Finals by surface Hard (2–5) Clay (2–1)

Result	W–L	Date	Tournament	Tier	Surface	Partnering	Opponents	Score
Loss	0–1	Mar 2018	Abierto Mexicano, Mexico	International (Note: The WTA International tournaments were reclassified as WTA 250 tournaments in 2021.)	Hard	(United States) Kaitlyn Christian	(Germany) Tatjana Maria (United Kingdom) Heather Watson	5–7, 6–2, [2–10]
Loss	0–2	Apr 2019	İstanbul Cup, Turkey	International	Clay	(Chile) Alexa Guarachi	(Hungary) Tímea Babos (France) Kristina Mladenovic	1–6, 0–6
Loss	0–3	Sep 2019	Tashkent Open, Uzbekistan	International	Hard	(Slovenia) Dalila Jakupović	(United States) Hayley Carter (Brazil) Luisa Stefani	3–6, 6–7^{(4–7)}
Loss	0–4	Mar 2021	St. Petersburg Trophy, Russia	WTA 500	Hard (i)	(United States) Kaitlyn Christian	(Ukraine) Nadiia Kichenok (Romania) Raluca Olaru	6–2, 3–6, [8–10]
Win	1–4	Mar 2022	Monterrey Open, Mexico	WTA 250	Hard	(United States) Catherine Harrison	(China) Han Xinyun (Russia) Yana Sizikova	1–6, 7–5, [10–6]
Loss	1–5	Sep 2022	Korea Open, South Korea	WTA 250	Hard	(United States) Asia Muhammad	(France) Kristina Mladenovic (Belgium) Yanina Wickmayer	3–6, 2–6
Win	2–5	May 2023	Rabat Grand Prix, Morocco	WTA 250	Clay	(Russia) Yana Sizikova	(Brazil) Ingrid Martins (Belarus) Lidziya Marozava	3–6, 6–1, [10–8]
Loss	2–6	Jan 2025	Auckland Open, New Zealand	WTA 250	Hard	(Serbia) Aleksandra Krunić	(China) Jiang Xinyu (Chinese Taipei) Wu Fang-hsien	3–6, 4–6
Win	3–6	Apr 2025	Open de Rouen, France	WTA 250	Clay (i)	(Serbia) Aleksandra Krunić	(Russia) Irina Khromacheva (Czech Republic) Linda Nosková	6–0, 6–4
Win	4–6	Feb 2026	Ostrava Open, Czech Republic	WTA 250	Hard	(Czech Republic) Anastasia Dețiuc	(Czech Republic) Lucie Havlíčková (Czech Republic) Dominika Šalková	6–4, 7–6^{(7–4)}

== WTA 125 finals ==
=== Doubles: 9 (4 titles, 5 runner-ups) ===
Result	W–L	Date	Tournament	Surface	Partner	Opponents	Score
Win	1–0	May 2021	Open de Saint-Malo, France	Clay	(United States) Kaitlyn Christian	(United States) Hayley Carter (Brazil) Luisa Stefani	7–6^{(7–4)}, 4–6, [10–5]
Loss	1–1	Oct 2023	Abierto Tampico, Mexico	Hard	(United Kingdom) Heather Watson	(Russia) Kamilla Rakhimova (Russia) Anastasia Tikhonova	6–7^{(5–7)}, 2–6
Win	2–1	Feb 2024	Mumbai Open, India	Hard	(Slovenia) Dalila Jakupović	(Netherlands) Arianne Hartono (India) Prarthana Thombare	6–4, 6–3
Win	3–1	Jun 2024	Makarska International, Croatia	Clay	(Belarus) Iryna Shymanovich	(Japan) Nao Hibino (Georgia (country)) Oksana Kalashnikova	6–4, 3–6, [10–6]
Loss	3–2	Sep 2024	Guadalajara 125 Open, Mexico	Hard	(Italy) Angelica Moratelli	(Poland) Katarzyna Piter (Hungary) Fanny Stollár	4–6, 5–7
Loss	3–3	May 2025	Emilia-Romagna Open, Italy	Clay	(China) Tang Qianhui	(Czech Republic) Jesika Malečková (Czech Republic) Miriam Škoch	2–6, 0–6
Loss	3–4	Jan 2026	Philippine Women's Open, Philippines	Hard	(United States) Quinn Gleason	(Hong Kong) Eudice Chong (Chinese Taipei) Liang En-shuo	6–2, 6–7^{(2–7)}, [6–10]
Win	4–4	Feb 2026	Midland Tennis Classic, United States	Hard (i)	(China) Tang Qianhui	(United States) Alana Smith (United States) Mary Stoiana	walkover
Loss	4–5	Mar 2026	Austin Challenger, United States	Hard	(Netherlands) Isabelle Haverlag	(Chinese Taipei) Chan Hao-ching (Japan) Miyu Kato	2–6, 3–6

== ITF Circuit finals ==
=== Singles: 3 (2 titles, 1 runner-up) ===
Legend $10/15,000 tournaments (2–1)	Finals by surface Clay (2–1)

Result	W–L	Date	Tournament	Tier	Surface	Opponent	Score
Loss	0–1	Jul 2013	ITF Rimini, Italy	10,000	Clay	(Italy) Alice Balducci	2–6, 1–6
Win	1–1	May 2016	ITF Warsaw, Poland	10,000	Clay	(Italy) Deborah Chiesa	6–1, 6–4
Win	2–1	Apr 2017	ITF Heraklion, Greece	15,000	Clay	(Austria) Mira Antonitsch	6–2, 6–0

=== Doubles: 22 (14 titles, 8 runner-ups) ===
Legend $100,000 tournaments (2–2) $80,000 tournaments (1–0) $50/60,000 tournaments (2–4) $25,000 tournaments (3–1) $10/15,000 tournaments (6–1)	Finals by surface Hard (9–2) Clay (5–6)

Result	W–L	Date	Tournament	Tier	Surface	Partner	Opponents	Score
Win	1–0	Jul 2010	ITF Evansville, United States	10,000	Hard	(United States) Brynn Boren	(Ukraine) Anastasia Kharchenko (Venezuela) Gabriela Paz	6–3, 6–4
Win	2–0	Jul 2011	ITF Evansville, United States	10,000	Hard	(United States) Brynn Boren	(United States) Nadia Echeverría Alam (United States) Elizabeth Ferris	6–4, 4–6, [11–9]
Win	3–0	Jul 2013	ITF Rimini, Italy	10,000	Clay	(United States) Kaitlyn Christian	(Italy) Giulia Gasparri (Switzerland) Lisa Sabino	6–2, 6–1
Win	4–0	Mar 2016	ITF Le Havre, France	10,000	Clay (i)	(United States) Bernarda Pera	(Spain) Georgina Garcia-Perez (Latvia) Diāna Marcinkeviča	6–2, 6–2
Win	5–0	May 2016	ITF Warsaw, Poland	10,000	Clay	(Finland) Emma Laine	(Italy) Deborah Chiesa (Sweden) Jacqueline Cabaj Awad	7–6^{(6)}, 6–0
Win	6–0	Oct 2016	ITF Redding, United States	25,000	Hard	(Bosnia and Herzegovina) Ema Burgić Bucko	(United States) Julia Elbaba (United States) Bernarda Pera	6–3, 7–6^{(4)}
Loss	6–1	Oct 2016	Tennis Classic of Macon, US	50,000	Hard	(United States) Keri Wong	(Netherlands) Michaëlla Krajicek (United States) Taylor Townsend	6–3, 2–6, [6–10]
Win	7–1	Apr 2017	ITF Tučepi, Croatia	15,000	Clay	(Finland) Emma Laine	(Slovakia) Jana Jablonovská (Slovakia) Sandra Jamrichová	6–3, 6–2
Loss	7–2	May 2017	ITF Charleston Pro, US	60,000	Clay	(United States) Kaitlyn Christian	(United States) Emina Bektas (Chile) Alexa Guarachi	7–5, 3–6, [5–10]
Win	8–2	Jun 2017	ITF Bethany Beach, US	25,000	Clay	(Papua New Guinea) Abigail Tere-Apisah	(United States) Sophie Chang (United States) Alexandra Mueller	6–4, 6–0
Win	9–2	Oct 2017	Tennis Classic of Macon, US	80,000	Hard	(United States) Kaitlyn Christian	(Brazil) Paula Cristina Gonçalves (United States) Sanaz Marand	6–1, 6–0
Win	10–2	Feb 2018	Midland Tennis Classic, US	100,000	Hard (i)	(United States) Kaitlyn Christian	(United States) Maria Sanchez (United States) Jessica Pegula	7–5, 4–6, [10–8]
Win	11–2	Feb 2018	Rancho Santa Fe Open, US	25,000	Hard	(United States) Kaitlyn Christian	(Czech Republic) Eva Hrdinová (United States) Taylor Townsend	6–7^{(6)}, 6–1, [10–6]
Loss	11–3	Mar 2018	ITF Heraklion, Greece	15,000	Clay	(Finland) Emma Laine	(Hungary) Anna Bondár (Hungary) Réka Luca Jani	5–7, 2–6
Loss	11–4	Apr 2018	Wiesbaden Open, Germany	25,000	Clay	(Sweden) Cornelia Lister	(Belgium) Hélène Scholsen (South Africa) Chanel Simmonds	3–6, 6–2, [8–10]
Win	12–4	May 2018	Open de Cagnes-sur-Mer, France	100,000	Hard	(United States) Kaitlyn Christian	(Belarus) Vera Lapko (Kazakhstan) Galina Voskoboeva	2–6, 7–5, [10–7]
Loss	12–5	Jul 2018	Berkeley Challenge, US	60,000	Hard	(Australia) Ellen Perez	(United States) Nicole Gibbs (United States) Asia Muhammad	4–6, 1–6
Win	13–5	Oct 2022	ITF Templeton Pro, US	W60	Hard	(Japan) Nao Hibino	(United States) Sophie Chang (Poland) Katarzyna Kawa	6–4, 7–6^{(4)}
Win	14–5	Nov 2022	Calgary Challenger, Canada	W60	Hard (i)	(United States) Catherine Harrison	(Canada) Kayla Cross (Canada) Marina Stakusic	7–6^{(2)}, 6–4
Loss	14–6	May 2024	Empire Slovak Open, Slovakia	W75	Clay	(Slovenia) Dalila Jakupović	(Slovenia) Veronika Erjavec (Slovenia) Tamara Zidanšek	4–6, 4–6
Loss	14–7	Aug 2024	Open Gran Canaria, Spain	W100	Clay	(Italy) Angelica Moratelli	(Poland) Katarzyna Piter (Hungary) Fanny Stollár	4–6, 2–6
Loss	14–8	Apr 2025	Oeiras CETO Open, Portugal	W100	Hard	(Serbia) Aleksandra Krunić	(Portugal) Francisca Jorge (Portugal) Matilde Jorge	7–6^{(7)}, 1–6, [0–1] ret.
