= 2022 WTA 125 tournaments =

Women's Tennis Association

Details
- Duration: 28 March – 18 December 2022
- Edition: 11th
- Tournaments: 24

Achievements (singles)
- Most titles: (Egypt) Mayar Sherif (3)
- Most finals: (Egypt) Mayar Sherif (3)

The WTA 125 tournaments are the secondary professional tennis circuit organised by the Women's Tennis Association. The 2022 calendar consists of twenty-four tournaments.

== Schedule ==
Week of	Tournament	Champions	Runners-up	Semifinalists	Quarterfinalists
March 28	AnyTech365 Andalucía Open; Marbella, Spain; Clay – $115,000 – 32S/8D; Singles – Doubles	(Egypt) Mayar Sherif; 7–6^{(7–1)}, 6–4	(Germany) Tamara Korpatsch	(Montenegro) Danka Kovinić (France) Océane Dodin	(Italy) Martina Trevisan (Slovakia) Anna Karolína Schmiedlová (Hungary) Panna Udvardy (Spain) Rebeka Masarova
March 28	AnyTech365 Andalucía Open; Marbella, Spain; Clay – $115,000 – 32S/8D; Singles – Doubles	(Romania) Irina Bara (Georgia (country)) Ekaterine Gorgodze; 6–4, 3–6, [10–6]	(Germany) Vivian Heisen (Poland) Katarzyna Kawa	(Montenegro) Danka Kovinić (France) Océane Dodin	(Italy) Martina Trevisan (Slovakia) Anna Karolína Schmiedlová (Hungary) Panna Udvardy (Spain) Rebeka Masarova
May 2	L'Open 35 de Saint-Malo; Saint-Malo, France; Clay – $115,000 – 32S/14Q/15D; Singles – Doubles	(Brazil) Beatriz Haddad Maia; 7–6^{(7–3)}, 6–3	Anna Blinkova	(Belgium) Maryna Zanevska (Poland) Magdalena Fręch	(United States) Madison Brengle (United States) Claire Liu (United States) Bernarda Pera (Poland) Magda Linette
May 2	L'Open 35 de Saint-Malo; Saint-Malo, France; Clay – $115,000 – 32S/14Q/15D; Singles – Doubles	(Japan) Eri Hozumi (Japan) Makoto Ninomiya; 7–6^{(7–1)}, 6–1	(France) Estelle Cascino (France) Jessika Ponchet	(Belgium) Maryna Zanevska (Poland) Magdalena Fręch	(United States) Madison Brengle (United States) Claire Liu (United States) Bernarda Pera (Poland) Magda Linette
May 9	Trophee Lagardère; Paris, France; Clay – $115,000 – 32S/8Q/16D; Singles – Doubles	(United States) Claire Liu; 6–3, 6–4	(Brazil) Beatriz Haddad Maia	(Estonia) Kaia Kanepi (Romania) Ana Bogdan	(Croatia) Donna Vekić; Varvara Gracheva (France) Elsa Jacquemot (Poland) Magdalena Fręch
May 9	Trophee Lagardère; Paris, France; Clay – $115,000 – 32S/8Q/16D; Singles – Doubles	(Brazil) Beatriz Haddad Maia (France) Kristina Mladenovic; 5–7, 6–4, [10–4]	(Georgia (country)) Oksana Kalashnikova (Japan) Miyu Kato	(Estonia) Kaia Kanepi (Romania) Ana Bogdan	(Croatia) Donna Vekić; Varvara Gracheva (France) Elsa Jacquemot (Poland) Magdalena Fręch
May 9	Liqui Moly Open; Karlsruhe, Germany; Clay – $115,000 – 32S/8D; Singles – Doubles	(Egypt) Mayar Sherif; 6–2, 6–4	(United States) Bernarda Pera	(Germany) Anna-Lena Friedsam (Hungary) Anna Bondár	(Hungary) Dalma Gálfi (Japan) Mai Hontama (Germany) Eva Lys (Hungary) Panna Udvardy
May 9	Liqui Moly Open; Karlsruhe, Germany; Clay – $115,000 – 32S/8D; Singles – Doubles	(Egypt) Mayar Sherif (Hungary) Panna Udvardy; 5–7, 6–4, [10–2]	Yana Sizikova (Belgium) Alison Van Uytvanck	(Germany) Anna-Lena Friedsam (Hungary) Anna Bondár	(Hungary) Dalma Gálfi (Japan) Mai Hontama (Germany) Eva Lys (Hungary) Panna Udvardy
May 31	Makarska Open 125; Makarska, Croatia; Clay – $115,000 – 32S/5Q/8D; Singles – Doubles	(Germany) Jule Niemeier; 7–5, 6–1	(Italy) Elisabetta Cocciaretto	(Slovakia) Anna Karolína Schmiedlová (Czech Republic) Linda Nosková	(Serbia) Olga Danilović (France) Clara Burel (Croatia) Tara Würth; Anastasia Gasanova
May 31	Makarska Open 125; Makarska, Croatia; Clay – $115,000 – 32S/5Q/8D; Singles – Doubles	(Slovenia) Dalila Jakupović (Croatia) Tena Lukas; 5–7, 6–2, [10–5]	(Serbia) Olga Danilović (Serbia) Aleksandra Krunić	(Slovakia) Anna Karolína Schmiedlová (Czech Republic) Linda Nosková	(Serbia) Olga Danilović (France) Clara Burel (Croatia) Tara Würth; Anastasia Gasanova
June 6	BBVA Open Internacional de Valencia; Valencia, Spain; Clay – $115,000 – 32S/10Q/8D; Singles – Doubles	(China) Zheng Qinwen; 6–4, 4–6, 6–3	(China) Wang Xiyu	(Spain) Nuria Párrizas Díaz (Sweden) Mirjam Björklund	(Austria) Julia Grabher (Hungary) Réka Luca Jani (Netherlands) Arantxa Rus (Bulgaria) Viktoriya Tomova
June 6	BBVA Open Internacional de Valencia; Valencia, Spain; Clay – $115,000 – 32S/10Q/8D; Singles – Doubles	(Spain) Aliona Bolsova (Spain) Rebeka Masarova; 6–0, 6–3	Alexandra Panova (Netherlands) Arantxa Rus	(Spain) Nuria Párrizas Díaz (Sweden) Mirjam Björklund	(Austria) Julia Grabher (Hungary) Réka Luca Jani (Netherlands) Arantxa Rus (Bulgaria) Viktoriya Tomova
June 13	Veneto Open Internazionali; Confindustria Venezia e Rovigo; Gaiba, Italy; Grass – $115,000 – 32S/16D; Singles – Doubles	(Belgium) Alison Van Uytvanck; 6–4, 6–3	(Italy) Sara Errani	(France) Harmony Tan (France) Diane Parry	(Switzerland) Ylena In-Albon (Romania) Ana Bogdan (Germany) Tatjana Maria (Ukraine) Kateryna Baindl
June 13	Veneto Open Internazionali; Confindustria Venezia e Rovigo; Gaiba, Italy; Grass – $115,000 – 32S/16D; Singles – Doubles	(United States) Madison Brengle (United States) Claire Liu; 6–4, 6–3	Vitalia Diatchenko (Georgia (country)) Oksana Kalashnikova	(France) Harmony Tan (France) Diane Parry	(Switzerland) Ylena In-Albon (Romania) Ana Bogdan (Germany) Tatjana Maria (Ukraine) Kateryna Baindl
July 4	Nordea Open; Båstad, Sweden; Clay – $115,000 – 32S/16D; Singles – Doubles	(South Korea) Jang Su-jeong; 3–6, 6–3, 6–1	(Spain) Rebeka Masarova	(Bulgaria) Viktoriya Tomova (United States) Lauren Davis	(Romania) Mihaela Buzărnescu (Hungary) Panna Udvardy (Sweden) Rebecca Peterson (Slovakia) Anna Karolína Schmiedlová
July 4	Nordea Open; Båstad, Sweden; Clay – $115,000 – 32S/16D; Singles – Doubles	(Japan) Misaki Doi (Sweden) Rebecca Peterson; Walkover	(Romania) Mihaela Buzărnescu; Irina Khromacheva	(Bulgaria) Viktoriya Tomova (United States) Lauren Davis	(Romania) Mihaela Buzărnescu (Hungary) Panna Udvardy (Sweden) Rebecca Peterson (Slovakia) Anna Karolína Schmiedlová
July 4	Grand Est Open 88; Contrexéville, France; Clay – $115,000 – 32S/8Q/8D; Singles – Doubles	(Italy) Sara Errani; 6–4, 1–6, 7–6^{(7–4)}	(Hungary) Dalma Gálfi	(Hungary) Anna Bondár (Spain) Cristina Bucșa	(Australia) Olivia Gadecki (Italy) Jasmine Paolini (France) Jessika Ponchet (Italy) Camilla Rosatello
July 4	Grand Est Open 88; Contrexéville, France; Clay – $115,000 – 32S/8Q/8D; Singles – Doubles	(Norway) Ulrikke Eikeri (Slovakia) Tereza Mihalíková; 7–6^{(10–8)}, 6–2	(China) Han Xinyun; Alexandra Panova	(Hungary) Anna Bondár (Spain) Cristina Bucșa	(Australia) Olivia Gadecki (Italy) Jasmine Paolini (France) Jessika Ponchet (Italy) Camilla Rosatello
August 1	BCR Iași Open; Iași, Romania; Clay – $115,000 – 32S/15Q/16D; Singles – Doubles	(Romania) Ana Bogdan; 6–2, 3–6, 6–1	(Hungary) Panna Udvardy	Darya Astakhova (Poland) Maja Chwalińska	(Argentina) Paula Ormaechea (Georgia (country)) Ekaterine Gorgodze (Spain) Rebeka Masarova (France) Kristina Mladenovic
August 1	BCR Iași Open; Iași, Romania; Clay – $115,000 – 32S/15Q/16D; Singles – Doubles	Darya Astakhova (Romania) Andreea Roșca; 7–5, 5–7, [10–7]	(Hungary) Réka Luca Jani (Hungary) Panna Udvardy	Darya Astakhova (Poland) Maja Chwalińska	(Argentina) Paula Ormaechea (Georgia (country)) Ekaterine Gorgodze (Spain) Rebeka Masarova (France) Kristina Mladenovic
August 8	Thoreau Tennis Open 125; Concord, United States; Hard – $115,000 – 32S/16Q/14D; Singles – Doubles	(United States) CoCo Vandeweghe; 6–3, 5–7, 6–4	(United States) Bernarda Pera	(China) Wang Qiang (United States) Katrina Scott	(Denmark) Clara Tauson (Poland) Magdalena Fręch (United States) Taylor Townsend (United States) Katie Volynets
August 8	Thoreau Tennis Open 125; Concord, United States; Hard – $115,000 – 32S/16Q/14D; Singles – Doubles	Varvara Flink (United States) CoCo Vandeweghe; 6–3, 7–6^{(7–3)}	(Thailand) Peangtarn Plipuech (Japan) Moyuka Uchijima	(China) Wang Qiang (United States) Katrina Scott	(Denmark) Clara Tauson (Poland) Magdalena Fręch (United States) Taylor Townsend (United States) Katie Volynets
August 15	Odlum Brown VanOpen; Vancouver, Canada; Hard – $115,000 – 32S/16Q/16D; Singles – Doubles	(Greece) Valentini Grammatikopoulou; 6–2, 6–4	(Italy) Lucia Bronzetti	(United States) Emma Navarro (Sweden) Rebecca Peterson	(United States) Madison Brengle (France) Chloé Paquet (Australia) Maddison Inglis (Andorra) Victoria Jiménez Kasintseva
August 15	Odlum Brown VanOpen; Vancouver, Canada; Hard – $115,000 – 32S/16Q/16D; Singles – Doubles	(Japan) Miyu Kato (United States) Asia Muhammad; 6–3, 7–5	(Hungary) Tímea Babos (United States) Angela Kulikov	(United States) Emma Navarro (Sweden) Rebecca Peterson	(United States) Madison Brengle (France) Chloé Paquet (Australia) Maddison Inglis (Andorra) Victoria Jiménez Kasintseva
September 5	Open Delle Puglie; Bari, Italy; Clay – $115,000 – 32S/8Q/15D; Singles – Doubles	(Austria) Julia Grabher; 6–4, 6–2	(Italy) Nuria Brancaccio	(Hungary) Réka Luca Jani (Italy) Matilde Paoletti	(Hungary) Panna Udvardy (Italy) Elisabetta Cocciaretto (Germany) Tatjana Maria (Netherlands) Eva Vedder
September 5	Open Delle Puglie; Bari, Italy; Clay – $115,000 – 32S/8Q/15D; Singles – Doubles	(Italy) Elisabetta Cocciaretto (Serbia) Olga Danilović; 6–2, 6–3	(Venezuela) Andrea Gámiz (Netherlands) Eva Vedder	(Hungary) Réka Luca Jani (Italy) Matilde Paoletti	(Hungary) Panna Udvardy (Italy) Elisabetta Cocciaretto (Germany) Tatjana Maria (Netherlands) Eva Vedder
September 12	Țiriac Foundation Trophy; Bucharest, Romania; Clay – $115,000 – 32S/16Q/8D; Singles – Doubles	(Romania) Irina-Camelia Begu; 6–3, 6–3	(Hungary) Réka Luca Jani	(Belgium) Maryna Zanevska (Italy) Sara Errani	(Hungary) Panna Udvardy (Egypt) Mayar Sherif (Spain) Rebeka Masarova (Ukraine) Kateryna Baindl
September 12	Țiriac Foundation Trophy; Bucharest, Romania; Clay – $115,000 – 32S/16Q/8D; Singles – Doubles	(Spain) Aliona Bolsova (Venezuela) Andrea Gámiz; 7–5, 6–3	(Hungary) Réka Luca Jani (Hungary) Panna Udvardy	(Belgium) Maryna Zanevska (Italy) Sara Errani	(Hungary) Panna Udvardy (Egypt) Mayar Sherif (Spain) Rebeka Masarova (Ukraine) Kateryna Baindl
September 19	Budapest Open 125; Budapest, Hungary; Clay – $115,000 – 32S/16Q/14D; Singles – Doubles	(Germany) Tamara Korpatsch; 7–6^{(7–3)}, 6–7^{(4–7)}, 6–0	(Bulgaria) Viktoriya Tomova	(France) Océane Dodin (Hungary) Anna Bondár	(United States) Lauren Davis (Slovakia) Anna Karolína Schmiedlová (Netherlands) Arantxa Rus (Slovenia) Tamara Zidanšek
September 19	Budapest Open 125; Budapest, Hungary; Clay – $115,000 – 32S/16Q/14D; Singles – Doubles	(Hungary) Anna Bondár (Belgium) Kimberley Zimmermann; 6–3, 2–6, [10–5]	(Czech Republic) Jesika Malečková (Czech Republic) Renata Voráčová	(France) Océane Dodin (Hungary) Anna Bondár	(United States) Lauren Davis (Slovakia) Anna Karolína Schmiedlová (Netherlands) Arantxa Rus (Slovenia) Tamara Zidanšek
October 17	Open Capfinances Rouen; Métropole; Rouen, France; Hard (i) – $115,000 – 32S/8Q/13D; Singles – Doubles	(Belgium) Maryna Zanevska; 7–6^{(8–6)}, 6–1	(Switzerland) Viktorija Golubic	Varvara Gracheva; Kamilla Rakhimova	(Spain) Cristina Bucșa (Croatia) Ana Konjuh (United States) Caty McNally (France) Kristina Mladenovic
October 17	Open Capfinances Rouen; Métropole; Rouen, France; Hard (i) – $115,000 – 32S/8Q/13D; Singles – Doubles	(Georgia (country)) Natela Dzalamidze; Kamilla Rakhimova; 6–2, 7–5	(Japan) Misaki Doi (Georgia (country)) Oksana Kalashnikova	Varvara Gracheva; Kamilla Rakhimova	(Spain) Cristina Bucșa (Croatia) Ana Konjuh (United States) Caty McNally (France) Kristina Mladenovic
October 24	Abierto Tampico; Tampico, Mexico; Hard – $115,000 – 32S/11Q/13D; Singles – Doubles	(Italy) Elisabetta Cocciaretto; 7–6^{(7–5)}, 4–6, 6–1	(Poland) Magda Linette	(Canada) Rebecca Marino (China) Zhu Lin	(Belgium) Elise Mertens (Canada) Leylah Fernandez (Czech Republic) Kateřina Siniaková (Colombia) Camila Osorio
October 24	Abierto Tampico; Tampico, Mexico; Hard – $115,000 – 32S/11Q/13D; Singles – Doubles	(Slovakia) Tereza Mihalíková (Indonesia) Aldila Sutjiadi; 7–5, 6–2	(United States) Ashlyn Krueger (United States) Elizabeth Mandlik	(Canada) Rebecca Marino (China) Zhu Lin	(Belgium) Elise Mertens (Canada) Leylah Fernandez (Czech Republic) Kateřina Siniaková (Colombia) Camila Osorio
October 31	Dow Tennis Classic; Midland, United States; Hard (i) – $115,000 – 32S/16Q/16D; Singles – Doubles	(United States) Caty McNally; 6–3, 6–2	(Germany) Anna-Lena Friedsam	(United States) Ann Li (United States) Peyton Stearns	(Japan) Nao Hibino (Colombia) Camila Osorio (Canada) Katherine Sebov (United States) Sofia Kenin
October 31	Dow Tennis Classic; Midland, United States; Hard (i) – $115,000 – 32S/16Q/16D; Singles – Doubles	(United States) Asia Muhammad (United States) Alycia Parks; 6–2, 6–3	(Germany) Anna-Lena Friedsam (Ukraine) Nadiia Kichenok	(United States) Ann Li (United States) Peyton Stearns	(Japan) Nao Hibino (Colombia) Camila Osorio (Canada) Katherine Sebov (United States) Sofia Kenin
November 7	LP Open by IND; Colina, Chile; Clay – $115,000 – 32S/8Q/16D; Singles – Doubles	(Egypt) Mayar Sherif; 3–6, 7–6^{(7–3)}, 7–5	(Ukraine) Kateryna Baindl	(United States) Caroline Dolehide (Montenegro) Danka Kovinić	(United States) Emma Navarro (Austria) Julia Grabher (Andorra) Victoria Jiménez Kasintseva; Diana Shnaider
November 7	LP Open by IND; Colina, Chile; Clay – $115,000 – 32S/8Q/16D; Singles – Doubles	Yana Sizikova (Indonesia) Aldila Sutjiadi; 6–1, 3–6, [10–7]	(Egypt) Mayar Sherif (Slovenia) Tamara Zidanšek	(United States) Caroline Dolehide (Montenegro) Danka Kovinić	(United States) Emma Navarro (Austria) Julia Grabher (Andorra) Victoria Jiménez Kasintseva; Diana Shnaider
November 14	Argentina Open; Buenos Aires, Argentina; Clay – $115,000 – 32S/8Q/16D; Singles – Doubles	(Hungary) Panna Udvardy; 6–4, 6–1	(Montenegro) Danka Kovinić	(Argentina) María Lourdes Carlé (Argentina) Paula Ormaechea	(Andorra) Victoria Jiménez Kasintseva (Italy) Sara Errani (Brazil) Laura Pigossi; Diana Shnaider
November 14	Argentina Open; Buenos Aires, Argentina; Clay – $115,000 – 32S/8Q/16D; Singles – Doubles	(Romania) Irina Bara (Italy) Sara Errani; 6–1, 7–5	(South Korea) Jang Su-jeong (China) You Xiaodi	(Argentina) María Lourdes Carlé (Argentina) Paula Ormaechea	(Andorra) Victoria Jiménez Kasintseva (Italy) Sara Errani (Brazil) Laura Pigossi; Diana Shnaider
November 21	Montevideo Open; Montevideo, Uruguay; Clay – $115,000 – 32S/8Q/16D; Singles – Doubles	Diana Shnaider; 6–4, 6–4	(France) Léolia Jeanjean	(Ukraine) Kateryna Baindl (Turkey) İpek Öz	(France) Clara Burel (United States) Hailey Baptiste; Darya Astakhova (Romania) Irina Bara
November 21	Montevideo Open; Montevideo, Uruguay; Clay – $115,000 – 32S/8Q/16D; Singles – Doubles	(Brazil) Ingrid Gamarra Martins (Brazil) Luisa Stefani; 7–5, 6–7^{(6–8)}, [10–6]	(United States) Quinn Gleason (France) Elixane Lechemia	(Ukraine) Kateryna Baindl (Turkey) İpek Öz	(France) Clara Burel (United States) Hailey Baptiste; Darya Astakhova (Romania) Irina Bara
November 28	Crèdit Andorrà Open; Andorra la Vella, Andorra; Hard (i) – $115,000 – 32S/8D; Singles – Doubles	(United States) Alycia Parks; 6–1, 6–4	(Sweden) Rebecca Peterson	(Croatia) Ana Konjuh (Spain) Cristina Bucșa	(China) Zhang Shuai (Poland) Weronika Falkowska (Germany) Sabine Lisicki (Belgium) Alison Van Uytvanck
November 28	Crèdit Andorrà Open; Andorra la Vella, Andorra; Hard (i) – $115,000 – 32S/8D; Singles – Doubles	(Spain) Cristina Bucșa (Poland) Weronika Falkowska; 7–6^{(7–4)}, 6–1	Angelina Gabueva; Anastasia Zakharova	(Croatia) Ana Konjuh (Spain) Cristina Bucșa	(China) Zhang Shuai (Poland) Weronika Falkowska (Germany) Sabine Lisicki (Belgium) Alison Van Uytvanck
December 5	Open P2I Angers Arena Loire; Angers, France; Hard (i) – $115,000 – 32S/16Q/8D; Singles – Doubles	(United States) Alycia Parks; 6–4, 4–6, 6–4	(Germany) Anna-Lena Friedsam	(France) Jessika Ponchet (Ukraine) Anhelina Kalinina	(Czech Republic) Markéta Vondroušová (France) Clara Burel (France) Émeline Dartron (Denmark) Clara Tauson
December 5	Open P2I Angers Arena Loire; Angers, France; Hard (i) – $115,000 – 32S/16Q/8D; Singles – Doubles	(United States) Alycia Parks (China) Zhang Shuai; 6–2, 6–2	(Czech Republic) Miriam Kolodziejová (Czech Republic) Markéta Vondroušová	(France) Jessika Ponchet (Ukraine) Anhelina Kalinina	(Czech Republic) Markéta Vondroušová (France) Clara Burel (France) Émeline Dartron (Denmark) Clara Tauson
December 12	Open BLS de Limoges; Limoges, France; Hard (i) – $115,000 – 32S/8Q/8D; Singles – Doubles	(Ukraine) Anhelina Kalinina; 6–3, 5–7, 6–4	(Denmark) Clara Tauson	Anna Blinkova (Italy) Lucia Bronzetti	(China) Zhang Shuai (Romania) Ana Bogdan; Varvara Gracheva (France) Clara Burel
December 12	Open BLS de Limoges; Limoges, France; Hard (i) – $115,000 – 32S/8Q/8D; Singles – Doubles	(Georgia (country)) Oksana Kalashnikova (Ukraine) Marta Kostyuk; 7–5, 6–1	(United Kingdom) Alicia Barnett (United Kingdom) Olivia Nicholls	Anna Blinkova (Italy) Lucia Bronzetti	(China) Zhang Shuai (Romania) Ana Bogdan; Varvara Gracheva (France) Clara Burel

== Statistical information ==
These tables present the number of singles (S) and doubles (D) titles won by each player and each nation during the season. The players/nations are sorted by: 1) total number of titles (a doubles title won by two players representing the same nation counts as only one win for the nation); 2) a singles > doubles hierarchy; 3) alphabetical order (by family names for players).

To avoid confusion and double counting, these tables should be updated only after an event is completed.

=== Titles won by player ===
Total	Player	S	D	S	D
4	Mayar Sherif (EGY)	● ● ●	●	3	1
4	Alycia Parks (USA)	● ●	● ●	2	2
2	Elisabetta Cocciaretto (ITA)	●	●	1	1
2	Sara Errani (ITA)	●	●	1	1
2	Beatriz Haddad Maia (BRA)	●	●	1	1
2	Claire Liu (USA)	●	●	1	1
2	Panna Udvardy (HUN)	●	●	1	1
2	CoCo Vandeweghe (USA)	●	●	1	1
2	Irina Bara (ROU)		● ●	0	2
2	Aliona Bolsova (ESP)		● ●	0	2
2	Tereza Mihalíková (SVK)		● ●	0	2
2	Asia Muhammad (USA)		● ●	0	2
2	Aldila Sutjiadi (INA)		● ●	0	2
1	Irina-Camelia Begu (ROU)	●		1	0
1	Ana Bogdan (ROU)	●		1	0
1	Julia Grabher (AUT)	●		1	0
1	Valentini Grammatikopoulou (GRE)	●		1	0
1	Jang Su-jeong (KOR)	●		1	0
1	Anhelina Kalinina (UKR)	●		1	0
1	Tamara Korpatsch (GER)	●		1	0
1	Caty McNally (USA)	●		1	0
1	Jule Niemeier (GER)	●		1	0
1	Diana Shnaider (25x17px) (Note: As of 1 March 2022, the ATP and WTA announced that players from Russia and Belarus will not compete in tournaments under the name or flag of Russia or Belarus due to the Russian invasion of Ukraine.)	●		1	0
1	Alison Van Uytvanck (BEL)	●		1	0
1	Maryna Zanevska (BEL)	●		1	0
1	Zheng Qinwen (CHN)	●		1	0
1	Darya Astakhova (25x17px)		●	0	1
1	Anna Bondár (HUN)		●	0	1
1	Madison Brengle (USA)		●	0	1
1	Cristina Bucșa (ESP)		●	0	1
1	Olga Danilović (SRB)		●	0	1
1	Misaki Doi (JPN)		●	0	1
1	Natela Dzalamidze (GEO)		●	0	1
1	Ulrikke Eikeri (NOR)		●	0	1
1	Weronika Falkowska (POL)		●	0	1
1	Varvara Flink (25x17px)		●	0	1
1	Ingrid Gamarra Martins (BRA)		●	0	1
1	Andrea Gámiz (VEN)		●	0	1
1	Ekaterine Gorgodze (GEO)		●	0	1
1	Eri Hozumi (JPN)		●	0	1
1	Dalila Jakupović (SLO)		●	0	1
1	Oksana Kalashnikova (GEO)		●	0	1
1	Miyu Kato (JPN)		●	0	1
1	Marta Kostyuk (UKR)		●	0	1
1	Tena Lukas (CRO)		●	0	1
1	Rebeka Masarova (ESP)		●	0	1
1	Kristina Mladenovic (FRA)		●	0	1
1	Makoto Ninomiya (JPN)		●	0	1
1	Rebecca Peterson (SWE)		●	0	1
1	Kamilla Rakhimova (25x17px)		●	0	1
1	Andreea Roșca (ROU)		●	0	1
1	Yana Sizikova (25x17px)		●	0	1
1	Luisa Stefani (BRA)		●	0	1
1	Zhang Shuai (CHN)		●	0	1
1	Kimberley Zimmermann (BEL)		●	0	1

=== Titles won by nation ===
Total	Nation	S	D
10	United States (USA)	5	5
5	Romania (ROU)	2	3
4	Egypt (EGY)	3	1
4	Italy (ITA)	2	2
3	Belgium (BEL)	2	1
3	Brazil (BRA)	1	2
3	Hungary (HUN)	1	2
3	Georgia (GEO)	0	3
3	Japan (JPN)	0	3
3	Spain (ESP)	0	3
2	Germany (GER)	2	0
2	China (CHN)	1	1
2	Ukraine (UKR)	1	1
2	Indonesia (INA)	0	2
2	Slovakia (SVK)	0	2
1	Austria (AUT)	1	0
1	Greece (GRE)	1	0
1	South Korea (KOR)	1	0
1	Croatia (CRO)	0	1
1	France (FRA)	0	1
1	Norway (NOR)	0	1
1	Poland (POL)	0	1
1	Serbia (SRB)	0	1
1	Slovenia (SLO)	0	1
1	Sweden (SWE)	0	1
1	Venezuela (VEN)	0	1

== Points distribution ==
Event	W	F	SF	QF	R16	R32	Q	Q2	Q1
Singles	160	95	57	29	15	1	6	4	1
Doubles (16D)	160	95	57	29	1	—	—	—	—
Doubles (8D)	160	95	57	1	—	—	—	—	—

== See also ==
- 2022 WTA Tour
- 2022 ITF Women's World Tennis Tour
- 2022 ATP Challenger Tour
