= 2023 Veneto Open =

- Date: 19–25 June
- Edition: 2nd
- Category: WTA 125
- Draw: 32S / 16D
- Prize money: $115,000
- Surface: Grass
- Location: Gaiba, Italy
- Venue: Tennis Club Gaiba

Champions

Singles
- (United States) Ashlyn Krueger

Doubles
- (South Korea) Han Na-lae / (South Korea) Jang Su-jeong
← 2022 ·	Veneto Open	· 2024 →

The 2023 Veneto Open promoted by Confindustria Veneto Est was a professional women's tennis tournament played on outdoor grass courts. It was the second edition of the tournament and part of the 2023 WTA 125 tournaments, offering a total of $115,000 in prize money. It took place at Via Alcide de Gasperi in Gaiba, Italy between 19 and 25 June 2023. It is the only WTA 125 event to be played on grass courts.

== Singles main-draw entrants ==
=== Seeds ===
Country	Player	Rank^{1}	Seed
GER	Tatjana Maria	66	1
ITA	Sara Errani	69	2
BEL	Ysaline Bonaventure	92	3
SRB	Olga Danilović	100	4
USA	Taylor Townsend	104	5
CHN	Yuan Yue	109	6
ITA	Lucrezia Stefanini	111	7
BEL	Yanina Wickmayer	114	8

- ^{1} Rankings are as of 13 June 2023.

=== Other entrants ===
The following players received a wildcard into the singles main draw:

- (Italy) Georgia Pedone
- (Italy) Lisa Pigato
- (Italy) Camilla Rosatello
- (Italy) Alessandra Teodosescu

The following players entered the singles main draw with protected ranking:

- (Slovakia) Jana Čepelová
- Evgeniya Rodina

== Doubles entrants ==
=== Seeds ===
Country	Player	Country	Player	Rank^{1}	Seed
USA	Ashlyn Krueger	USA	Angela Kulikov	175	1
NED	Bibiane Schoofs	BEL	Yanina Wickmayer	178	2

- ^{1} Rankings as of 13 June 2023.

=== Other entrants ===
The following pair received a wildcard into the doubles main draw:

- (Italy) Nuria Brancaccio / (Italy) Lucrezia Stefanini

== Champions ==
=== Singles ===
- (United States) Ashlyn Krueger def. (Germany) Tatjana Maria 3–6, 6–4, 7–5

=== Doubles ===
- (South Korea) Han Na-lae / (South Korea) Jang Su-jeong def. (Poland) Weronika Falkowska / (Poland) Katarzyna Piter 6–3, 3–6, [10–6]
