= 2022 Veneto Open =

- Date: 13–19 June
- Edition: 1st
- Category: WTA 125
- Draw: 32S / 16D
- Prize money: $115,000
- Surface: Grass
- Location: Gaiba, Italy
- Venue: Tennis Club Gaiba

Champions

Singles
- (Belgium) Alison Van Uytvanck

Doubles
- (United States) Madison Brengle / (United States) Claire Liu
Veneto Open	· 2023 →

The 2022 Veneto Open Internazionali Confindustria Venezia e Rovigo was a professional women's tennis tournament played on outdoor grass courts. It was the first edition of the tournament and part of the 2022 WTA 125 tournaments, offering a total of $115,000 in prize money. It took place at Via Alcide de Gasperi in Gaiba, Italy between 13 and 19 June 2022. It became the first ever WTA 125 event to be played on grass courts.

== Singles main-draw entrants ==
=== Seeds ===
Country	Player	Rank^{1}	Seed
BEL	Alison Van Uytvanck	46	1
USA	Madison Brengle	56	2
ITA	Lucia Bronzetti	72	3
USA	Claire Liu	74	4
NED	Arantxa Rus	77	5
FRA	Diane Parry	82	6
BEL	Greet Minnen	88	7
FRA	Chloé Paquet	101	8

- ^{1} Rankings are as of 6 June 2022.

=== Other entrants ===
The following players received a wildcard into the singles main draw:

- (Italy) Melania Delai
- (Italy) Cristiana Ferrando
- (Italy) Matilde Paoletti
- (Italy) Lisa Pigato

The following players entered the main draw with protected ranking:

- (Ukraine) Kateryna Baindl

=== Withdrawals ===
Before the tournament

- (Romania) Mihaela Buzărnescu → replaced by (Italy) Elisabetta Cocciaretto
- (Japan) Misaki Doi → replaced by (Italy) Lucrezia Stefanini
- (Georgia (country)) Ekaterine Gorgodze → replaced by (Switzerland) Joanne Züger
- (Hungary) Réka Luca Jani → replaced by (Czech Republic) Linda Fruhvirtová
- (Argentina) Nadia Podoroska → replaced by (Switzerland) Susan Bandecchi
- (Brazil) Laura Pigossi → replaced by (Italy) Sara Errani
- (Italy) Martina Trevisan → replaced by (Italy) Federica Di Sarra
- (China) Yuan Yue → replaced by (Belgium) Ysaline Bonaventure

== Doubles entrants ==
=== Seeds ===
Country	Player	Country	Player	Rank^{1}	Seed
SVK	Tereza Mihalíková	BEL	Greet Minnen	118	1
	Anastasia Potapova		Yana Sizikova	182	2
USA	Ingrid Neel	NED	Rosalie van der Hoek	255	3
POL	Paula Kania-Choduń	FRA	Elixane Lechemia	284	4

- ^{1} Rankings as of 6 June 2022.

=== Other entrants ===
The following pair received a wildcard into the doubles main draw:

- (Italy) Matilde Paoletti / (Italy) Lisa Pigato

== Champions ==
=== Singles ===
- (Belgium) Alison Van Uytvanck def. (Italy) Sara Errani 6–4, 6–3

=== Doubles ===
- (United States) Madison Brengle / (United States) Claire Liu def. Vitalia Diatchenko / (Georgia (country)) Oksana Kalashnikova 6–4, 6–3
