= 2024 Veneto Open – Doubles =

Doubles
- 2024 Veneto Open

Final
- Champions: (United States) Hailey Baptiste (United States) Alycia Parks
- Runners-up: (Czech Republic) Miriam Kolodziejová (Czech Republic) Anna Sisková
- Score: 7–6^{(7–4)}, 6–2

Events
Singles	Doubles
← 2023 ·	Veneto Open	· 2025 →

Hailey Baptiste and Alycia Parks won the doubles title at the 2024 Veneto Open, defeating Miriam Kolodziejová and Anna Sisková in the final, 7–6^{(7–4)}, 6–2.

Han Na-lae and Jang Su-jeong were the reigning champions, but did not participate this year.

== Seeds ==
1. (Kazakhstan) Anna Danilina / (China) Xu Yifan (quarterfinals)
2. (Czech Republic) Miriam Kolodziejová / (Czech Republic) Anna Sisková (final)

== Draw ==
=== Key ===
- Q = Qualifier
- WC = Wild card
- LL = Lucky loser
- Alt = Alternate
- SE = Special exempt
- PR = Protected ranking
- ITF = ITF entry
- JE = Junior exempt
- w/o = Walkover
- r = Retired
- d = Defaulted
- SR = Special ranking

=== Draw ===
Quarterfinals
1	(Kazakhstan) A Danilina (China) Y Xu	5	6	[6]
(United States) H Baptiste (United States) A Parks	7	4	[10]
(France) E Lechemia (Belgium) K Zimmermann	5	1
(Italy) A Moratelli (Switzerland) C Perrin	7	6
WC	(Italy) A Abbagnato (Italy) G Pedone	4	4
(France) E Cascino (Italy) C Rosatello	6	6
E Andreeva (Argentina) ML Carlé	1	5
2	(Czech Republic) M Kolodziejová (Czech Republic) A Sisková	6	7

Semifinals
(United States) H Baptiste (United States) A Parks	6	6
(Italy) A Moratelli (Switzerland) C Perrin	2	3
(France) E Cascino (Italy) C Rosatello	2	3
2	(Czech Republic) M Kolodziejová (Czech Republic) A Sisková	6	6

Final
(United States) H Baptiste (United States) A Parks	7^{7}	6
2	(Czech Republic) M Kolodziejová (Czech Republic) A Sisková	6^{4}	2
