= 2023 Veneto Open – Singles =

Singles
- 2023 Veneto Open

Final
- Champion: (United States) Ashlyn Krueger
- Runner-up: (Germany) Tatjana Maria
- Score: 3–6, 6–4, 7–5

Details
- Draw: 32
- Seeds: 8

Events
Singles	Doubles
← 2022 ·	Veneto Open	· 2024 →

Alison Van Uytvanck was the reigning champion, but chose not to participate.

Ashlyn Krueger won the title, defeating Tatjana Maria in the final, 3–6, 6–4, 7–5.

== Seeds ==
1. (Germany) Tatjana Maria (final)
2. (Italy) Sara Errani (first round)
3. (Belgium) Ysaline Bonaventure (quarterfinals)
4. (Serbia) Olga Danilović (semifinals)
5. (United States) Taylor Townsend (first round)
6. (China) Yuan Yue (quarterfinals)
7. (Italy) Lucrezia Stefanini (quarterfinals)
8. (Belgium) Yanina Wickmayer (quarterfinals)

== Draw ==
=== Key ===
- Q = Qualifier
- WC = Wild card
- LL = Lucky loser
- Alt = Alternate
- SE = Special exempt
- PR = Protected ranking
- ITF = ITF entry
- JE = Junior exempt
- w/o = Walkover
- r = Retired
- d = Defaulted
- SR = Special ranking

=== Finals ===
Semifinals
1	(Germany) Tatjana Maria	6	6
4	(Serbia) Olga Danilović	1	3
(United States) Robin Montgomery	7^{7}	4	2
(United States) Ashlyn Krueger	6^{4}	6	6

Final
1	(Germany) Tatjana Maria	6	4	5
(United States) Ashlyn Krueger	3	6	7

=== Top half ===
First round
1	(Germany) T Maria	6	6
(Switzerland) Y In-Albon	3	4
(Croatia) A Konjuh	3	6	4
WC	(Italy) L Pigato	6	3	6
(United States) S Kenin	6	6
(Slovenia) T Zidanšek	4	2
(Australia) P Hon	5	4
8	(Belgium) Y Wickmayer	7	6
4	(Serbia) O Danilović	6	7
WC	(Italy) A Teodosescu	2	5
(Romania) J Cristian	5	3
(Austria) S Kraus	7	6
WC	(Italy) C Rosatello	3	4
(South Korea) S-j Jang	6	6
(South Korea) N-l Han	6	4	6^{4}
6	(China) Y Yuan	2	6	7^{7}

Second round
1	(Germany) T Maria	6	6
WC	(Italy) L Pigato	3	3
(United States) S Kenin	6	4	5
8	(Belgium) Y Wickmayer	3	6	7
4	(Serbia) O Danilović	6	7^{7}
(Austria) S Kraus	3	6^{2}
(South Korea) S-j Jang	1	0
6	(China) Y Yuan	6	6

Quarterfinals
1	(Germany) T Maria	6	7
8	(Belgium) Y Wickmayer	3	5
4	(Serbia) O Danilović	6	7^{7}
6	(China) Y Yuan	4	6^{5}

Semifinals
1	(Germany) T Maria	6	6
4	(Serbia) O Danilović	1	3

=== Bottom half ===
First round
5	(United States) T Townsend	6	4	6^{4}
(United States) R Montgomery	4	6	7^{7}
(Brazil) L Pigossi	3	6	6
PR	(Slovakia) J Čepelová	6	3	1
(Italy) N Brancaccio	6	6
(Romania) I Bara	4	1
(Spain) M Bassols Ribera	7^{7}	2	4
3	(Belgium) Y Bonaventure	6^{4}	6	6
7	(Italy) L Stefanini	3	6	7
(Belgium) M Kempen	6	2	5
PR	E Rodina	4	6	7
WC	(Italy) G Pedone	6	3	5
(United States) A Krueger	6	6
(Slovenia) D Jakupović	3	2
(United Kingdom) K Swan	7	7
2	(Italy) S Errani	5	5

Second round
(United States) R Montgomery	6	6^{3}	6
(Brazil) L Pigossi	0	7^{7}	0
(Italy) N Brancaccio	2	2
3	(Belgium) Y Bonaventure	6	6
7	(Italy) L Stefanini	6	6
PR	E Rodina	2	4
(United States) A Krueger	6	4	5
(United Kingdom) K Swan	3	6	5^{r}

Quarterfinals
(United States) R Montgomery	6	6
3	(Belgium) Y Bonaventure	4	2
7	(Italy) L Stefanini	2	1
(United States) A Krueger	6	6

Semifinals
(United States) R Montgomery	7^{7}	4	2
(United States) A Krueger	6^{4}	6	6
