= 2024 Veneto Open =

- Date: 17–23 June
- Edition: 3rd
- Category: WTA 125
- Draw: 32S / 8D
- Prize money: $115,000
- Surface: Grass
- Location: Gaiba, Italy
- Venue: Tennis Club Gaiba

Champions

Singles
- (United States) Alycia Parks

Doubles
- (United States) Hailey Baptiste / (United States) Alycia Parks
← 2023 ·	Veneto Open	· 2025 →

The 2024 Veneto Open promoted by Regione del Veneto was a professional women's tennis tournament played on outdoor grass courts. It was the third edition of the tournament and part of the 2024 WTA 125 tournaments, offering a total of $115,000 in prize money. It took place at Via Alcide de Gasperi in Gaiba, Italy between 17 and 23 June 2024. It is the only WTA 125 event to be played on grass courts.

== Champions ==
=== Singles ===
- (United States) Alycia Parks def. (United States) Bernarda Pera, 6–3, 6–1

=== Doubles ===
- (United States) Hailey Baptiste / (United States) Alycia Parks def. (Czech Republic) Miriam Kolodziejová / (Czech Republic) Anna Sisková 7–6^{(7–4)}, 6–2

== Singles main-draw entrants ==
=== Seeds ===
Country	Player	Rank^{1}	Seed
~~GER~~	~~Tatjana Maria~~	~~56~~	~~1~~
ARG	María Lourdes Carlé	86	2
ESP	Jéssica Bouzas Maneiro	87	3
ITA	Sara Errani	88	4
MEX	Renata Zarazúa	97	5
USA	Hailey Baptiste	99	6
	Erika Andreeva	100	7
USA	Bernarda Pera	106	8

- ^{1} Rankings are as of 10 June 2024.

=== Other entrants ===
The following players received a wildcard into the singles main draw:

- (Italy) Sara Errani
- (Italy) Giorgia Pedone
- (Italy) Beatrice Ricci
- (Italy) Camilla Rosatello

The following players received entry from the qualifying draw:

- (Switzerland) Susan Bandecchi
- (United States) Elvina Kalieva
- (United States) Varvara Lepchenko
- (United States) Alycia Parks

The following players received entry as lucky losers:

- (India) Ankita Raina
- (Czech Republic) Anna Sisková

=== Withdrawals ===
Before the tournament

- (Argentina) Martina Capurro Taborda → replaced by (Serbia) Natalija Stevanović
- (France) Léolia Jeanjean → replaced by (France) Carole Monnet
- (Germany) Eva Lys → replaced by (Romania) Irina Bara
- (Germany) Tatjana Maria → replaced by (Czech Republic) Anna Sisková
- (Argentina) Julia Riera → replaced by (Romania) Anca Todoni
- Valeria Savinykh → replaced by (Ukraine) Katarina Zavatska
- (Slovakia) Rebecca Šramková → replaced by (Italy) Lucrezia Stefanini → * (Italy) Lucrezia Stefanini → replaced by (India) Ankita Raina
- (Bulgaria) Viktoriya Tomova → replaced by (Bulgaria) Gergana Topalova
- (United States) Sachia Vickery → replaced by Aliona Falei

== Doubles entrants ==
=== Seeds ===
Country	Player	Country	Player	Rank^{1}	Seed
KAZ	Anna Danilina	CHN	Xu Yifan	106	1
CZE	Miriam Kolodziejová	CZE	Anna Sisková	147	2

- ^{1} Rankings as of 10 June 2024.

=== Other entrants ===
The following pair received a wildcard into the doubles main draw:

- (Italy) Anastasia Abbagnato / (Italy) Giorgia Pedone
