= 2022 Odlum Brown Vancouver Open – Men's singles =

Men's singles
- 2022 Odlum Brown Vancouver Open

Final
- Champion: (France) Constant Lestienne
- Runner-up: (France) Arthur Rinderknech
- Score: 6–0, 4–6, 6–3

Events
Singles	men	women
Doubles	men	women
- Vancouver Open

Ričardas Berankis was the defending champion but lost in the quarterfinals to Arthur Rinderknech.

Constant Lestienne won the title after defeating Rinderknech 6–0, 4–6, 6–3 in the final.

== Seeds ==
1. (Japan) Yoshihito Nishioka (first round, retired)
2. (Czech Republic) Jiří Veselý (second round)
3. (France) Arthur Rinderknech (final)
4. (Sweden) Mikael Ymer (quarterfinals)
5. (France) Constant Lestienne (champion)
6. (Lithuania) Ričardas Berankis (quarterfinals)
7. (Chile) Nicolás Jarry (first round)
8. (Switzerland) Marc-Andrea Hüsler (second round)

== Draw ==
Key

- Q = Qualifier
- WC = Wild card
- LL = Lucky loser
- Alt = Alternate
- ITF = ITF entry
- PR = Protected ranking
- SR = Special ranking
- SE = Special exempt
- JE = Junior exempt
- JR = Junior Accelerator Programme entrant
- CO = College Accelerator Programme entrant
- NG = Next Gen Accelerator Program entrant
- w/o = Walkover
- r = Retired
- d = Defaulted

=== Finals ===
Semifinals
5	(France) Constant Lestienne	6	4	6
(France) Ugo Humbert	4	6	4
3	(France) Arthur Rinderknech	6	6
(Canada) Vasek Pospisil	4	4

Final
5	(France) Constant Lestienne	6	4	6
3	(France) Arthur Rinderknech	0	6	3

=== Top half ===
First round
1	(Japan) Y Nishioka	7	4	0^{r}
WC	(Canada) A Galarneau	5	6	0
(Spain) F Verdasco	6	6
(Argentina) JP Ficovich	3	4
(Germany) D Koepfer	6	6
(Hungary) Z Piros	2	3
Q	(France) L Lokoli	5	6^{4}
5	(France) C Lestienne	7	7^{7}
4/WC	(Sweden) M Ymer	6	6
(France) M Guinard	3	1
Q	(Australia) L Saville	4	2
(United Kingdom) L Broady	6	6
(France) U Humbert	6	7
Q	(France) C Chidekh	0	5
Q	(United States) G Nanda	2	6	5
8	(Switzerland) M-A Hüsler	6	4	7

Second round
WC	(Canada) A Galarneau	6	4	2
(Spain) F Verdasco	2	6	6
(Germany) D Koepfer	7	5	3
5	(France) C Lestienne	5	7	6
4/WC	(Sweden) M Ymer	6	4	6
(United Kingdom) L Broady	3	6	2
(France) U Humbert	6	6
8	(Switzerland) M-A Hüsler	3	2

Quarterfinals
(Spain) F Verdasco	2	6	3
5	(France) C Lestienne	6	4	6
4/WC	(Sweden) M Ymer	7	2	2
(France) U Humbert	5	6	6

Semifinals
5	(France) C Lestienne	6	4	6
(France) U Humbert	4	6	4

=== Bottom half ===
First round
6	(Lithuania) R Berankis	2	6	6
(United States) E Escobedo	6	4	0
WC	(Canada) G Diallo	4	6	7^{7}
(Belgium) Z Bergs	6	2	6^{5}
(Japan) K Uchida	6^{1}	4
(Sweden) E Ymer	7^{7}	6
Q	(United States) A Ayeni	7^{7}	6^{3}	4
3	(France) A Rinderknech	6^{4}	7^{7}	6
7	(Chile) N Jarry	6^{4}	2
(Australia) J Thompson	7^{7}	6
(Brazil) F Meligeni Alves	5	3
(Canada) V Pospisil	7	6
Q	(United States) U Blanch	4	6^{3}
Alt	(France) G Simon	6	7^{7}
Alt	(Switzerland) A Ritschard	4	1
2	(Czech Republic) J Veselý	6	6

Second round
6	(Lithuania) R Berankis	6	6
WC	(Canada) G Diallo	4	1
(Sweden) E Ymer	6	6^{8}	2
3	(France) A Rinderknech	3	7^{10}	6
(Australia) J Thompson	6	2	3
(Canada) V Pospisil	3	6	6
Alt	(France) G Simon	2	6	7^{7}
2	(Czech Republic) J Veselý	6	3	6^{0}

Quarterfinals
6	(Lithuania) R Berankis	6^{3}	2
3	(France) A Rinderknech	7^{7}	6
(Canada) V Pospisil	6	7
Alt	(France) G Simon	1	5

Semifinals
3	(France) A Rinderknech	6	6
(Canada) V Pospisil	4	4
