= 2023 Veneto Open – Doubles =

Doubles
- 2023 Veneto Open

Final
- Champions: (South Korea) Han Na-lae (South Korea) Jang Su-jeong
- Runners-up: (Poland) Weronika Falkowska (Poland) Katarzyna Piter
- Score: 6–3, 3–6, [10–6]

Events
Singles	Doubles
← 2022 ·	Veneto Open	· 2024 →

Madison Brengle and Claire Liu were the reigning champions, but chose not to participate.

Han Na-lae and Jang Su-jeong won the title, defeating Weronika Falkowska and Katarzyna Piter in the final, 6–3, 3–6, [10–6].

== Seeds ==
1. (United States) Ashlyn Krueger / (United States) Angela Kulikov (quarterfinals)
2. (Netherlands) Bibiane Schoofs / (Belgium) Yanina Wickmayer (semifinals)

== Draw ==
=== Key ===
- Q = Qualifier
- WC = Wild card
- LL = Lucky loser
- Alt = Alternate
- SE = Special exempt
- PR = Protected ranking
- ITF = ITF entry
- JE = Junior exempt
- w/o = Walkover
- r = Retired
- d = Defaulted
- SR = Special ranking

=== Draw ===
Quarterfinals
1	(United States) A Krueger (United States) A Kulikov	6^{5}	6	[7]
(South Korea) N-l Han (South Korea) S-j Jang	7^{7}	4	[10]
(Romania) J Cristian (Serbia) O Danilović	6	4	[10]
A Anshba (Czech Republic) A Dețiuc	4	6	[5]
(Netherlands) R van der Hoek (Czech Republic) R Voráčová	3	4
(Poland) W Falkowska (Poland) K Piter	6	6
WC	(Italy) N Brancaccio (Italy) L Stefanini	7	5	[6]
2	(Netherlands) B Schoofs (Belgium) Y Wickmayer	5	7	[10]

Semifinals
(South Korea) N-l Han (South Korea) S-j Jang	7^{7}	4	[10]
(Romania) J Cristian (Serbia) O Danilović	6^{1}	6	[5]
(Poland) W Falkowska (Poland) K Piter	4	6	[10]
2	(Netherlands) B Schoofs (Belgium) Y Wickmayer	6	2	[5]

Final
(South Korea) N-l Han (South Korea) S-j Jang	6	3	[10]
(Poland) W Falkowska (Poland) K Piter	3	6	[6]
