= 2024 Veneto Open – Singles =

Singles
- 2024 Veneto Open

Final
- Champion: (United States) Alycia Parks
- Runner-up: (United States) Bernarda Pera
- Score: 6–3, 6–1

Details
- Draw: 32
- Seeds: 8

Events
Singles	Doubles
← 2023 ·	Veneto Open	· 2025 →

Alycia Parks won the title, defeating Bernarda Pera in the final, 6–3, 6–1. She saved two match points en route to the title, in her qualifying match against Anna Sisková.

Ashlyn Krueger was the defending champion, but chose not to participate.

== Seeds ==
1. (Germany) Tatjana Maria (withdrew)
2. (Argentina) María Lourdes Carlé (first round)
3. (Spain) Jéssica Bouzas Maneiro (first round)
4. (Italy) Sara Errani (semifinals)
5. (Mexico) Renata Zarazúa (second round)
6. (United States) Hailey Baptiste (first round, retired)
7. Erika Andreeva (second round)
8. (United States) Bernarda Pera (final)

== Draw ==
=== Key ===
- Q = Qualifier
- WC = Wild card
- LL = Lucky loser
- Alt = Alternate
- SE = Special exempt
- PR = Protected ranking
- ITF = ITF entry
- JE = Junior exempt
- w/o = Walkover
- r = Retired
- d = Defaulted
- SR = Special ranking

=== Finals ===
Semifinals
Q	(Switzerland) Susan Bandecchi	3	6	3
Q	(United States) Alycia Parks	6	1	6
4/WC	(Italy) Sara Errani	6	5	3
8	(United States) Bernarda Pera	4	7	6

Final
Q	(United States) Alycia Parks	6	6
8	(United States) Bernarda Pera	3	1

=== Top half ===
First round
LL	(Czech Republic) A Sisková	5	6	3
(Romania) I Bara	7	1	6
LL	(India) A Raina	7	6
(Czech Republic) D Šalková	5	3
Q	(Switzerland) S Bandecchi	6	6
(New Zealand) L Sun	3	4
WC	(Italy) C Rosatello	6	3	3
7	E Andreeva	4	6	6
3	(Spain) J Bouzas Maneiro	2	4
(Romania) A Todoni	6	6
Q	(United States) E Kalieva	6^{5}	5
Q	(United States) A Parks	7^{7}	7
WC	(Italy) B Ricci	1	2
(United States) R Montgomery	6	6
(Slovakia) V Hrunčáková	6^{6}	2
5	(Mexico) R Zarazúa	7^{8}	6

Second round
(Romania) I Bara	2	6	0
LL	(India) A Raina	6	2	6
Q	(Switzerland) S Bandecchi	7	6
7	E Andreeva	5	4
(Romania) A Todoni	0	2
Q	(United States) A Parks	6	6
(United States) R Montgomery	6	3	6
5	(Mexico) R Zarazúa	4	6	4

Quarterfinals
LL	(India) A Raina	4	7^{8}	3
Q	(Switzerland) S Bandecchi	6	6^{6}	6
Q	(United States) A Parks	6^{7}	6	6
(United States) R Montgomery	7^{9}	3	4

Semifinals
Q	(Switzerland) S Bandecchi	3	6	3
Q	(United States) A Parks	6	1	6

=== Bottom half ===
First round
6	(United States) H Baptiste	1	0^{r}
WC	(Italy) G Pedone	6	1
(Philippines) A Eala	6	7
(France) C Monnet	3	5
(Bulgaria) G Topalova	2	2
(Ukraine) K Zavatska	6	6
(Serbia) N Stevanović	2	4
4/WC	(Italy) S Errani	6	6
8	(United States) B Pera	6	6
(Latvia) D Semeņistaja	3	4
A Falei	1	6	6
Q	(United States) V Lepchenko	6	1	2
(Belgium) A Van Uytvanck	7	6
(Switzerland) C Naef	5	1
K Rakhimova	3	6	6
2	(Argentina) ML Carlé	6	4	4

Second round
WC	(Italy) G Pedone	3	3
(Philippines) A Eala	6	6
(Ukraine) K Zavatska	6^{4}	5
4/WC	(Italy) S Errani	7^{7}	7
8	(United States) B Pera	6	7
A Falei	4	5
(Belgium) A Van Uytvanck	6^{1}	0^{r}
K Rakhimova	7^{7}	1

Quarterfinals
(Philippines) A Eala	0	6^{3}
4/WC	(Italy) S Errani	6	7^{7}
8	(United States) B Pera	6	6
K Rakhimova	3	3

Semifinals
4/WC	(Italy) S Errani	6	5	3
8	(United States) B Pera	4	7	6

== Qualifying ==
=== Seeds ===
1. (United States) Alycia Parks (qualified)
2. (United States) Varvara Lepchenko (qualified)
3. (United States) Elvina Kalieva (qualified)
4. (India) Ankita Raina (qualifying competition, lucky loser)

=== Qualifiers ===
1. (United States) Alycia Parks
2. (United States) Varvara Lepchenko
3. (United States) Elvina Kalieva
4. (Switzerland) Susan Bandecchi

=== Lucky losers ===
1. (India) Ankita Raina
2. (Czech Republic) Anna Sisková

=== Draw ===
==== First qualifier ====
Qualifying competition
1	(United States) Alycia Parks	6	4	7^{7}
	(Czech Republic) Anna Sisková	1	6	6^{1}

==== Second qualifier ====
Qualifying competition
2	(United States) Varvara Lepchenko	w/o
WC	(Italy) Jennifer Ruggeri

==== Third qualifier ====
Qualifying competition
3	(United States) Elvina Kalieva	6	6
WC	(Italy) Anastasia Abbagnato	0	4

==== Fourth qualifier ====
Qualifying competition
4	(India) Ankita Raina	4	0
	(Switzerland) Susan Bandecchi	6	6
