= 2022 Odlum Brown Vancouver Open – Men's doubles =

Men's doubles
- 2022 Odlum Brown Vancouver Open

Final
- Champions: (Sweden) André Göransson (Japan) Ben McLachlan
- Runners-up: (Philippines) Treat Huey (Australia) John-Patrick Smith
- Score: 6–7^{(4–7)}, 7–6^{(9–7)}, [11–9]

Events
Singles	men	women
Doubles	men	women
- Vancouver Open

Robert Lindstedt and Jonny O'Mara were the defending champions but chose not to defend their title.

André Göransson and Ben McLachlan won the title after defeating Treat Huey and John-Patrick Smith 6–7^{(4–7)}, 7–6^{(9–7)}, [11–9] in the final.

== Seeds ==
1. (United States) Nathaniel Lammons / (United States) Jackson Withrow (first round)
2. (Belgium) Sander Gillé / (United States) Max Schnur (semifinals)
3. (Sweden) André Göransson / (Japan) Ben McLachlan (champions)
4. (United States) Robert Galloway / (United States) Alex Lawson (first round)

== Draw ==
Key

- Q = Qualifier
- WC = Wild card
- LL = Lucky loser
- Alt = Alternate
- ITF = ITF entry
- PR = Protected ranking
- SR = Special ranking
- SE = Special exempt
- JE = Junior exempt
- JR = Junior Accelerator Programme entrant
- CO = College Accelerator Programme entrant
- NG = Next Gen Accelerator Program entrant
- w/o = Walkover
- r = Retired
- d = Defaulted

First round
1	(United States) N Lammons (United States) J Withrow	6^{3}	5
(Philippines) T Huey (Australia) J-P Smith	7^{7}	7
4	(United States) R Galloway (United States) A Lawson	3	6	[7]
WC	(Canada) A Galarneau (Canada) B Sigouin	6	3	[10]
(Belgium) R Bemelmans (Belgium) Z Bergs	4	6	[5]
PR	(India) Y Bhambri (India) S Myneni	6	2	[10]
(United Kingdom) J Cash (United Kingdom) H Patten	4	6^{5}
(France) M Guinard (France) A Rinderknech	6	7^{7}
(Australia) J Kubler (Greece) M Pervolarakis	3	4
3	(Sweden) A Göransson (Japan) B McLachlan	6	6
(Australia) L Saville (Australia) J Thompson	6	4	[17]
(France) J Eysseric (New Zealand) A Sitak	1	6	[15]
WC	(Canada) L Draxl (Canada) C Harper	0	2
2	(Belgium) S Gillé (United States) M Schnur	6	6

Quarterfinals
(Philippines) T Huey (Australia) J-P Smith	7^{7}	6
(Tunisia) A Dougaz (France) A Escoffier	6^{4}	4
WC	(Canada) A Galarneau (Canada) B Sigouin	4	4
PR	(India) Y Bhambri (India) S Myneni	6	6
(France) M Guinard (France) A Rinderknech	3	7	[7]
3	(Sweden) A Göransson (Japan) B McLachlan	6	5	[10]
(Australia) L Saville (Australia) J Thompson	4	2
2	(Belgium) S Gillé (United States) M Schnur	6	6

Semifinals
(Philippines) T Huey (Australia) J-P Smith	6	6^{2}	[10]
PR	(India) Y Bhambri (India) S Myneni	1	7^{7}	[7]
3	(Sweden) A Göransson (Japan) B McLachlan	6	7
2	(Belgium) S Gillé (United States) M Schnur	1	5

Final
(Philippines) T Huey (Australia) J-P Smith	7^{7}	6^{7}	[9]
3	(Sweden) A Göransson (Japan) B McLachlan	6^{4}	7^{9}	[11]
