= 2022 Montevideo Open =

- Date: 22–27 November
- Edition: 2nd
- Category: WTA 125
- Prize money: $115,000
- Surface: Clay
- Location: Montevideo, Uruguay
- Venue: Carrasco Lawn Tennis Club

Champions

Singles
- Diana Shnaider

Doubles
- (Brazil) Ingrid Gamarra Martins / (Brazil) Luisa Stefani
- Montevideo Open

The 2022 Montevideo Open was a professional women's tennis tournament played on outdoor red clay courts at the Carrasco Lawn Tennis Club in Montevideo, Uruguay. It was the second edition of the tournament and part of the 2022 WTA 125 tournaments. It took place at the Carrasco Lawn Tennis Club in Montevideo, Uruguay between November 22 and 27, 2022.

== Singles entrants ==
=== Seeds ===
Country	Player	Rank^{1}	Seed
~~MNE~~	~~Danka Kovinić~~	~~71~~	~~1~~
~~HUN~~	~~Panna Udvardy~~	~~83~~	~~2~~
SLO	Tamara Zidanšek	86	3
ITA	Sara Errani	108	4
HUN	Réka Luca Jani	110	5
UKR	Kateryna Baindl	113	6
BRA	Laura Pigossi	115	7
KOR	Jang Su-jeong	118	8
AND	Victoria Jiménez Kasintseva	121	9
FRA	Léolia Jeanjean	125	10

- Rankings are as of November 14, 2022.

=== Other entrants ===
The following players received wildcards into the singles main draw:

- (Argentina) Martina Capurro Taborda
- (Uruguay) Guillermina Grant
- (Argentina) Julia Riera
- (Argentina) Solana Sierra

The following players received entry from the qualifying draw:

- (Colombia) Emiliana Arango
- (Hungary) Tímea Babos
- (Netherlands) Eva Vedder
- (China) You Xiaodi

The following player received entry into the main draw as a lucky loser:

- (Spain) Yvonne Cavallé Reimers

=== Withdrawals ===
Before the tournament

- (Austria) Julia Grabher → replaced by Diana Shnaider
- (Poland) Maja Chwalińska → replaced by (Ukraine) Kateryna Baindl
- (Montenegro) Danka Kovinić → replaced by (Spain) Rosa Vicens Mas
- (United States) Elizabeth Mandlik → replaced by (Romania) Irina Bara
- (France) Chloé Paquet → replaced by (United States) Hailey Baptiste
- (Spain) Nuria Párrizas Díaz → replaced by (Argentina) María Lourdes Carlé
- (Hungary) Panna Udvardy → replaced by (Spain) Yvonne Cavallé Reimers

== Doubles entrants ==
=== Seeds ===
Country	Player	Country	Player	Rank^{1}	Seed
HUN	Tímea Babos	GEO	Ekaterine Gorgodze	175	1
BRA	Ingrid Gamarra Martins	BRA	Luisa Stefani	186	2
VEN	Andrea Gámiz	NED	Eva Vedder	218	3
USA	Jessie Aney	USA	Ingrid Neel	221	4

- ^{1} Rankings as of 14 November 2022.

=== Other entrants ===
The following pair received a wildcard into the doubles main draw:

- (Uruguay) Guillermina Grant / (Bolivia) Noelia Zeballos

== Champions ==
=== Singles ===
- Diana Shnaider def. (France) Léolia Jeanjean, 6–4, 6–4

=== Doubles ===
- (Brazil) Ingrid Gamarra Martins / (Brazil) Luisa Stefani def. (United States) Quinn Gleason / (France) Elixane Lechemia 7–5, 6–7^{(6–8)}, [10–6]
