= 2022 BBVA Open Internacional de Valencia =

Tennis tournament

- Date: 6–12 June 2022
- Edition: 2nd
- Category: WTA 125
- Prize money: $115,000
- Surface: Clay
- Location: Valencia, Spain
- Venue: Valencia Tennis Club

Champions

Singles
- (China) Zheng Qinwen

Doubles
- (Spain) Aliona Bolsova / (Spain) Rebeka Masarova
- Open Internacional de Valencia

The 2022 BBVA Open Internacional de Valencia was a professional women's tennis tournament played on outdoor clay courts. It was the second edition of the tournament and first ever as a WTA 125 event which is also part of the 2022 WTA 125 tournaments season. It took place in Valencia, Spain between 6 and 12 June 2022.

== Singles main-draw entrants ==
=== Seeds ===
Country	Player	Rank^{1}	Seed
ESP	Nuria Párrizas Díaz	45	1
	Varvara Gracheva	71	2
CHN	Zheng Qinwen	74	3
NED	Arantxa Rus	78	4
	Anastasia Potapova	80	5
SVK	Kristína Kučová	88	6
ROU	Ana Bogdan	93	7
HUN	Dalma Gálfi	96	8

- ^{1} Rankings are as of 23 May 2022.

=== Other entrants ===
The following players received wildcards into the singles main draw:

- (Spain) Aliona Bolsova
- (Spain) Irene Burillo Escorihuela
- (Spain) Ángela Fita Boluda
- (Argentina) Solana Sierra

The following players received entry from the qualifying draw:

- (Australia) Seone Mendez
- (France) Carole Monnet
- (Spain) Leyre Romero Gormaz
- (Ukraine) Katarina Zavatska

The following player received entry as a lucky loser:

- (France) Elsa Jacquemot

=== Withdrawals ===
Before the tournament

- (Romania) Irina-Camelia Begu → replaced by (Serbia) Olga Danilović
- (Ukraine) Marta Kostyuk → replaced by (Sweden) Mirjam Björklund
- (Serbia) Aleksandra Krunić → replaced by (France) Elsa Jacquemot
- (Sweden) Rebecca Peterson → replaced by (Hungary) Réka Luca Jani
- (Argentina) Nadia Podoroska → replaced by (Mexico) Renata Zarazúa
- (Slovakia) Anna Karolína Schmiedlová → replaced by (Italy) Sara Errani
- (Egypt) Mayar Sherif → replaced by (Austria) Julia Grabher
- (Italy) Martina Trevisan → replaced by (Spain) Rebeka Masarova

== Doubles entrants ==
=== Seeds ===
Country	Player	Country	Player	Rank^{1}	Seed
ROU	Irina Bara	GEO	Ekaterine Gorgodze	112	1
	Alexandra Panova	(Netherlands)	Arantxa Rus	176	2

- ^{1} Rankings as of 23 May 2022.

== Champions ==
=== Singles ===
- (China) Zheng Qinwen def. (China) Wang Xiyu 6–4, 4–6, 6–3

=== Doubles ===
- (Spain) Aliona Bolsova / (Spain) Rebeka Masarova def. Alexandra Panova / (Netherlands) Arantxa Rus 6–0, 6–3
