= 2022 Odlum Brown Vancouver Open =

- Date: 14–21 August 2022
- Edition: 15th (men); 18th (women)
- Category: ATP Challenger 125; WTA 125
- Draw: 32S/16D
- Prize money: $159,360 (men) $115,000 (women)
- Surface: Hard
- Location: Vancouver, Canada
- Venue: Hollyburn Country Club

Champions

Men's singles
- (France) Constant Lestienne

Women's singles
- (Greece) Valentini Grammatikopoulou

Men's doubles
- (Sweden) André Göransson / (Japan) Ben McLachlan

Women's doubles
- (Japan) Miyu Kato / (United States) Asia Muhammad
- Vancouver Open

The 2022 Odlum Brown Vancouver Open was a professional tennis tournament played on outdoor hardcourts. It was the fifteenth edition of the men's event and eighteenth of the women's, which were also part of the 2022 ATP Challenger 125 and the 2022 WTA 125 tournaments respectively. It was also the first edition of the women's event as a WTA 125 after being upgraded from the ITF 100K tournament. It took place in Vancouver, Canada between 14 and 21 August 2022. The tournament could not be staged in 2020 and 2021 due to the COVID-19 pandemic.

== Men's singles main-draw entrants ==
=== Seeds ===
Country	Player	Rank^{1}	Seed
JPN	Yoshihito Nishioka	54	1
CZE	Jiří Veselý	66	2
FRA	Arthur Rinderknech	67	3
SWE	Mikael Ymer	77	4
FRA	Constant Lestienne	90	5
LTU	Ričardas Berankis	98	6
CHI	Nicolás Jarry	105	7
SUI	Marc-Andrea Hüsler	111	8

- ^{1} Rankings are as of August 8, 2022.

=== Other entrants ===
The following players received wildcards into the singles main draw:

- (Canada) Gabriel Diallo
- (Canada) Alexis Galarneau
- (Sweden) Mikael Ymer

The following players received entry into the singles main draw as alternates:

- (Switzerland) Alexander Ritschard
- (France) Gilles Simon

The following players received entry from the qualifying draw:

- (United States) Alafia Ayeni
- (United States) Ulises Blanch
- (France) Clément Chidekh
- (France) Laurent Lokoli
- (United States) Govind Nanda
- (Australia) Luke Saville

== Women's singles main-draw entrants ==
=== Seeds ===
Country	Player	Rank^{1}	Seed
USA	Madison Brengle	64	1
ITA	Lucia Bronzetti	65	2
USA	Claire Liu	81	3
CHN	Wang Xinyu	83	4
SWE	Rebecca Peterson	88	5
CAN	Rebecca Marino	96	6
BEL	Greet Minnen	97	7
JPN	Misaki Doi	98	8

- ^{1} Rankings are as of 8 August 2022.

=== Other entrants ===
The following players received wildcards into the singles main draw:

- (Canada) Eugenie Bouchard
- (Canada) Cadence Brace
- (Canada) Marina Stakusic
- (Canada) Carol Zhao

The following players received entry from the qualifying draw:

- (Greece) Valentini Grammatikopoulou
- (United States) Catherine Harrison
- (Australia) Priscilla Hon
- (United Kingdom) Yuriko Miyazaki

The following player received entry as a lucky loser:

- (Japan) Kurumi Nara

=== Withdrawals ===
Before the tournament

- (United Kingdom) Katie Boulter → replaced by (Poland) Maja Chwalińska
- Varvara Flink → replaced by (Andorra) Victoria Jiménez Kasintseva
- (Australia) Jaimee Fourlis → replaced by (United States) Emma Navarro
- (Czech Republic) Linda Fruhvirtová → replaced by (Australia) Astra Sharma
- (Belgium) Greet Minnen → replaced by (Netherlands) Arianne Hartono
- (China) Wang Qiang → replaced by (Japan) Kurumi Nara

During the tournament

- (United States) Catherine Harrison (right foot injury)

== Women's doubles main-draw entrants ==
=== Seeds ===
Country	Player	Country	Player	Rank^{†}	Seed
JPN	Miyu Kato	USA	Asia Muhammad	103	1
JPN	Misaki Doi	SWE	Rebecca Peterson	212	2
JPN	Nao Hibino	GEO	Oksana Kalashnikova	217	3
HUN	Tímea Babos	USA	Angela Kulikov	230	4

† Rankings are as of 8 August 2022

=== Other entrants ===
The following pair received a wildcard entry into main draw:

- (Canada) Eugenie Bouchard / (Canada) Kayla Cross

=== Withdrawals ===
Before the tournament

- (Hungary) Tímea Babos / (Belgium) Greet Minnen → replaced by (Canada) Rebecca Marino / (United Kingdom) Heather Watson
- (United States) Emina Bektas / (United States) Catherine Harrison → replaced by (Brazil) Ingrid Gamarra Martins / (United Kingdom) Emily Webley-Smith
- (United States) Sophie Chang / (United States) Angela Kulikov → replaced by (Australia) Astra Sharma / (United States) CoCo Vandeweghe

During the tournament

- (Australia) Astra Sharma / (United States) CoCo Vandeweghe (Vandeweghe – right shoulder injury)

== Champions ==
=== Men's singles ===
- (France) Constant Lestienne def. (France) Arthur Rinderknech 6–0, 4–6, 6–3.

=== Women's singles ===
- (Greece) Valentini Grammatikopoulou def. (Italy) Lucia Bronzetti, 6–2, 6–4

=== Men's doubles ===
- (Sweden) André Göransson / (Japan) Ben McLachlan def. (Philippines) Treat Huey / (Australia) John-Patrick Smith 6–7^{(4–7)}, 7–6^{(9–7)}, [11–9].

=== Women's doubles ===
- (Japan) Miyu Kato / (United States) Asia Muhammad def. (Hungary) Tímea Babos / (United States) Angela Kulikov, 6–3, 7–5
