= 2022 BBVA Open Internacional de Valencia – Doubles =

Doubles
- 2022 BBVA Open Internacional de Valencia

Final
- Champions: (Spain) Aliona Bolsova (Spain) Rebeka Masarova
- Runners-up: Alexandra Panova (Netherlands) Arantxa Rus
- Score: 6–0, 6–3

Events
Singles	Doubles
- Open Internacional de Valencia

Ysaline Bonaventure and Ekaterine Gorgodze were the defending champions, but Bonaventure chose not to participate. Gorgodze partnered Irina Bara but lost in the semifinals to eventual champions Aliona Bolsova and Rebeka Masarova.

Bolsova and Masarova won the title, defeating Alexandra Panova and Arantxa Rus 6–0, 6–3 in the final.

== Seeds ==
1. (Romania) Irina Bara / (Georgia (country)) Ekaterine Gorgodze (semifinals)
2. Alexandra Panova / (Netherlands) Arantxa Rus (final)

== Draw ==
Key

- Q = Qualifier
- WC = Wild card
- LL = Lucky loser
- Alt = Alternate
- ITF = ITF entry
- PR = Protected ranking
- SR = Special ranking
- SE = Special exempt
- JE = Junior exempt
- JR = Junior Accelerator Programme entrant
- CO = College Accelerator Programme entrant
- NG = Next Gen Accelerator Program entrant
- w/o = Walkover
- r = Retired
- d = Defaulted

=== Draw ===
Quarterfinals
1	(Romania) I Bara (Georgia (country)) E Gorgodze	6	6
(France) D Parry (China) Q Zheng	0	4
(Spain) A Bolsova (Spain) R Masarova	6	6
WC	(Spain) Á Fita Boluda (Spain) L Romero Gormaz	2	4
(Indonesia) B Gumulya (Chinese Taipei) Y-c Hsieh	3	3
(Czech Republic) A Dețiuc (Czech Republic) M Kolodziejová	6	6
A Potapova; Y Sizikova	5	4
2	A Panova (Netherlands) A Rus	7	6

Semifinals
1	(Romania) I Bara (Georgia (country)) E Gorgodze	4	3
(Spain) A Bolsova (Spain) R Masarova	6	6
(Czech Republic) A Dețiuc (Czech Republic) M Kolodziejová	4	7	[8]
2	A Panova (Netherlands) A Rus	6	5	[10]

Final
(Spain) A Bolsova (Spain) R Masarova	6	6
2	A Panova (Netherlands) A Rus	0	3
