= 2022 BBVA Open Internacional de Valencia – Singles =

Singles
- 2022 BBVA Open Internacional de Valencia

Final
- Champion: (China) Zheng Qinwen
- Runner-up: (China) Wang Xiyu
- Score: 6–4, 4–6, 6–3

Events
Singles	Doubles
- Open Internacional de Valencia

Martina Trevisan was the defending champion but chose not to participate.

Zheng Qinwen won the title, defeating Wang Xiyu 6–4, 4–6, 6–3 in the final.

== Seeds ==
1. (Spain) Nuria Párrizas Díaz (semifinals)
2. Varvara Gracheva (second round)
3. (China) Zheng Qinwen (champion)
4. (Netherlands) Arantxa Rus (quarterfinals)
5. Anastasia Potapova (second round)
6. (Slovakia) Kristína Kučová (second round)
7. (Romania) Ana Bogdan (first round)
8. (Hungary) Dalma Gálfi (first round)

== Draw ==
Key

- Q = Qualifier
- WC = Wild card
- LL = Lucky loser
- Alt = Alternate
- ITF = ITF entry
- PR = Protected ranking
- SR = Special ranking
- SE = Special exempt
- JE = Junior exempt
- JR = Junior Accelerator Programme entrant
- CO = College Accelerator Programme entrant
- NG = Next Gen Accelerator Program entrant
- w/o = Walkover
- r = Retired
- d = Defaulted

=== Finals ===
Semifinals
1	(Spain) Nuria Párrizas Díaz	3	6	5
3	(China) Zheng Qinwen	6	4	7
(Sweden) Mirjam Björklund	3	4
(China) Wang Xiyu	6	6

Final
3	(China) Zheng Qinwen	6	4	6
(China) Wang Xiyu	4	6	3

=== Top half ===
First round
1	(Spain) N Párrizas Díaz	4	6	6
LL	(France) E Jacquemot	6	1	4
WC	(Spain) Á Fita Boluda	4	6	3
Q	(Ukraine) K Zavatska	6	3	6
Q	(France) C Monnet	5	3
(Austria) J Grabher	7	6
O Selekhmeteva	7	5	2
5	A Potapova	5	7	6
3	(China) Q Zheng	6	6
(Spain) A Lázaro García	4	2
(Romania) I Bara	6	6
(Serbia) O Danilović	2	4
Q	(Spain) L Romero Gormaz	7	6
WC	(Argentina) S Sierra	5	2
(Hungary) RL Jani	6	6
8	(Hungary) D Gálfi	3	2

Second round
1	(Spain) N Párrizas Díaz	6	6^{5}	6
Q	(Ukraine) K Zavatska	4	7^{7}	1
(Austria) J Grabher	5	6	6
5	A Potapova	7	3	4
3	(China) Q Zheng	4	6	6
(Romania) I Bara	6	3	0
Q	(Spain) L Romero Gormaz	3	7^{8}	4
(Hungary) RL Jani	6	6^{6}	6

Quarterfinals
1	(Spain) N Párrizas Díaz	7	6
(Austria) J Grabher	5	2
3	(China) Q Zheng	7^{7}	6
(Hungary) RL Jani	6^{4}	0

Semifinals
1	(Spain) N Párrizas Díaz	3	6	5
3	(China) Q Zheng	6	4	7

=== Bottom half ===
First round
6	(Slovakia) K Kučová	6	4
Q	(Australia) S Mendez	4	1^{r}
(Sweden) M Björklund	3	6	7
WC	(Spain) A Bolsova	6	3	5
(France) D Parry	6^{4}	6^{3}
(Georgia (country)) E Gorgodze	7^{7}	7^{7}
WC	(Spain) I Burillo Escorihuela	2	6^{2}
4	(Netherlands) A Rus	6	7^{7}
7	(Romania) A Bogdan	1	5
(China) Xiyu Wang	6	7
(Spain) R Masarova	6	7
(Poland) M Chwalińska	1	5
(Bulgaria) V Tomova	6	6
(Italy) S Errani	4	3
(Mexico) R Zarazúa	5	6^{3}
2	V Gracheva	7	7^{7}

Second round
6	(Slovakia) K Kučová	6	4	5
(Sweden) M Björklund	1	6	7
(Georgia (country)) E Gorgodze	2	5
4	(Netherlands) A Rus	6	7
(China) Xiyu Wang	4	7	7
(Spain) R Masarova	6	5	5
(Bulgaria) V Tomova	0	6	6
2	V Gracheva	6	3	1

Quarterfinals
(Sweden) M Björklund	3	7^{7}	6
4	(Netherlands) A Rus	6	6^{4}	2
(China) Xiyu Wang	2	6	7^{7}
(Bulgaria) V Tomova	6	2	6^{5}

Semifinals
(Sweden) M Björklund	3	4
(China) Xiyu Wang	6	6

== Qualifying ==
=== Seeds ===
1. Oksana Selekhmeteva (moved to main draw)
2. (France) Elsa Jacquemot (qualifying competition, lucky loser)
3. (Ukraine) Katarina Zavatska (qualified)
4. (Australia) Seone Mendez (qualified)
5. (France) Carole Monnet (qualified)
6. (Chile) Daniela Seguel (first round)
7. (Spain) Leyre Romero Gormaz (qualified)
8. (Spain) Lucía Cortez Llorca (qualifying competition)

=== Qualifiers ===
1. (France) Carole Monnet
2. (Spain) Leyre Romero Gormaz
3. (Ukraine) Katarina Zavatska
4. (Australia) Seone Mendez

=== Lucky loser ===
1. (France) Elsa Jacquemot

=== First qualifier ===
Qualifying competition
	Bye
5	(France) Carole Monnet

=== Second qualifier ===
First round			Qualifying competition
			2	(France) Elsa Jacquemot	6	1	2
			7/WC	(Spain) Leyre Romero Gormaz	4	6	6
WC	(United States) Emira Stafford		7/WC	(Spain) Leyre Romero Gormaz	4	6	6
7/WC	(Spain) Leyre Romero Gormaz	w/o

=== Third qualifier ===
First round				Qualifying competition
				3/PR	(Ukraine) Katarina Zavatska	6	6
					Yana Sizikova	1	4
	Yana Sizikova	6	6		Yana Sizikova	1	4
6	(Chile) Daniela Seguel	4	2

=== Fourth qualifier ===
First round				Qualifying competition
				4	(Australia) Seone Mendez	2	6	6
				8	(Spain) Lucía Cortez Llorca	6	3	4
WC	(Spain) Carmen López Martínez	4	2	8	(Spain) Lucía Cortez Llorca	6	3	4
8	(Spain) Lucía Cortez Llorca	6	6
