= Veneto Open =

Defunct tennis tournament
- Event name: Veneto Open promoted by Confindustria Veneto Est
- Tour: WTA Tour
- Founded: 2022
- Abolished: 2024
- Location: Gaiba; Italy
- Category: WTA 125
- Surface: Grass - outdoors
- Draw: 32S / 8D
- Prize money: US$115,000 (2024)

Current champions (2024)
- Women's singles: (United States) Alycia Parks
- Women's doubles: (United States) Hailey Baptiste (United States) Alycia Parks

The Veneto Open is a WTA 125-level professional women's tennis tournament. It takes place on outdoor grass courts, in the month of June at the Tennis Club Gaiba in the city of Gaiba in Italy in preparation for Wimbledon Championships. The prize money is $115,000. When the tournament was introduced in 2022, it became the first ever WTA 125 tournament to be played on grass courts. Among locals the tournament is also called Gaibledon.

== Finals ==
=== Singles ===
Year	Champion	Runner-up	Score
2022	(Belgium) Alison Van Uytvanck	(Italy) Sara Errani	6–4, 6–3
2023	(United States) Ashlyn Krueger	(Germany) Tatjana Maria	3–6, 6–4, 7–5
2024	(United States) Alycia Parks	(United States) Bernarda Pera	6–3, 6–1

=== Doubles ===
Year	Champions	Runners-up	Score
2022	(United States) Madison Brengle (United States) Claire Liu	Vitalia Diatchenko (Georgia (country)) Oksana Kalashnikova	6–4, 6–3
2023	(South Korea) Han Na-lae (South Korea) Jang Su-jeong	(Poland) Weronika Falkowska (Poland) Katarzyna Piter	6–3, 3–6, [10–6]
2024	(United States) Hailey Baptiste (United States) Alycia Parks	(Czech Republic) Miriam Kolodziejová (Czech Republic) Anna Sisková	7–6^{(7–4)}, 6–2

== See also ==
- Emilia-Romagna Open
