= 2022 Veneto Open – Doubles =

Doubles
- 2022 Veneto Open

Final
- Champions: (United States) Madison Brengle (United States) Claire Liu
- Runners-up: Vitalia Diatchenko (Georgia (country)) Oksana Kalashnikova
- Score: 6–4, 6–3

Events
Singles	Doubles
Veneto Open	· 2023 →

This was the first edition of the tournament.

Madison Brengle and Claire Liu won the title, defeating Vitalia Diatchenko and Oksana Kalashnikova 6–4, 6–3 in the final.

== Seeds ==
1. (Slovakia) Tereza Mihalíková / (Belgium) Greet Minnen (quarterfinals, withdrew)
2. Anastasia Potapova / Yana Sizikova (semifinals)
3. (United States) Ingrid Neel / (Netherlands) Rosalie van der Hoek (first round)
4. (Poland) Paula Kania-Choduń / (France) Elixane Lechemia (quarterfinals)

== Draw ==
=== Key ===
- Q = Qualifier
- WC = Wild card
- LL = Lucky loser
- Alt = Alternate
- SE = Special exempt
- PR = Protected ranking
- ITF = ITF entry
- JE = Junior exempt
- w/o = Walkover
- r = Retired
- d = Defaulted
- SR = Special ranking

=== Draw ===
First round
1	(Slovakia) T Mihalíková (Belgium) G Minnen	6	6
(Lithuania) J Mikulskytė (Australia) O Tjandramulia	3	4
(Indonesia) B Gumulya (Chinese Taipei) Y-c Hsieh	5	4
V Diatchenko (Georgia (country)) O Kalashnikova	7	6
4	(Poland) P Kania-Choduń (France) E Lechemia	6	6
(Switzerland) S Bandecchi (Switzerland) Y In-Albon	1	4
(Netherlands) L Pattinama Kerkhove (Netherlands) A Rus	6	4	[10]
(Spain) R Masarova (France) D Parry	3	6	[7]
(United States) M Brengle (United States) C Liu	6	6
(Brazil) R Pereira (Indonesia) J Rompies	0	1
(Romania) A Bogdan (Italy) M Trevisan	7	0	[10]
3	(United States) I Neel (Netherlands) R van der Hoek	5	6	[8]
WC	(Italy) M Paoletti (Italy) L Pigato	3	6	[8]
(Australia) M Adamczak (Japan) M Kato	6	3	[10]
(Belgium) Y Bonaventure (Czech Republic) R Voráčová	4	1
2	A Potapova; Y Sizikova	6	6

Quarterfinals
1	(Slovakia) T Mihalíková (Belgium) G Minnen
V Diatchenko (Georgia (country)) O Kalashnikova	w/o
4	(Poland) P Kania-Choduń (France) E Lechemia	4	4
(Netherlands) L Pattinama Kerkhove (Netherlands) A Rus	6	6
(United States) M Brengle (United States) C Liu	6	7^{7}
(Romania) A Bogdan (Italy) M Trevisan	4	6^{4}
(Australia) M Adamczak (Japan) M Kato	4	4
2	A Potapova; Y Sizikova	6	6

Semifinals
V Diatchenko (Georgia (country)) O Kalashnikova	7^{9}	1	[10]
(Netherlands) L Pattinama Kerkhove (Netherlands) A Rus	6^{7}	6	[8]
(United States) M Brengle (United States) C Liu	6	6
2	A Potapova; Y Sizikova	3	4

Final
V Diatchenko (Georgia (country)) O Kalashnikova	4	3
(United States) M Brengle (United States) C Liu	6	6
