= 2022 Veneto Open – Singles =

Singles
- 2022 Veneto Open

Final
- Champion: (Belgium) Alison Van Uytvanck
- Runner-up: (Italy) Sara Errani
- Score: 6–4, 6–3

Details
- Draw: 32
- Seeds: 8

Events
Singles	Doubles
Veneto Open	· 2023 →

This was the first edition of the tournament.

Alison Van Uytvanck won the title, defeating Sara Errani 6–4, 6–3 in the final.

== Seeds ==
1. (Belgium) Alison Van Uytvanck (champion)
2. (United States) Madison Brengle (first round)
3. (Italy) Lucia Bronzetti (second round)
4. (United States) Claire Liu (second round)
5. (Netherlands) Arantxa Rus (second round)
6. (France) Diane Parry (semifinals)
7. (Belgium) Greet Minnen (first round)
8. (France) Chloé Paquet (first round)

== Draw ==
=== Key ===
- Q = Qualifier
- WC = Wild card
- LL = Lucky loser
- Alt = Alternate
- SE = Special exempt
- PR = Protected ranking
- ITF = ITF entry
- JE = Junior exempt
- w/o = Walkover
- r = Retired
- d = Defaulted
- SR = Special ranking

=== Finals ===
Semifinals
1	(Belgium) Alison Van Uytvanck	7^{7}	6
(France) Harmony Tan	6^{3}	3
6	(France) Diane Parry	3	4
(Italy) Sara Errani	6	6

Final
1	(Belgium) Alison Van Uytvanck	6	6
(Italy) Sara Errani	4	3

=== Top half ===
First round
1	(Belgium) A Van Uytvanck	6	6
WC	(Italy) C Ferrando	4	1
(Belgium) Y Bonaventure	6	7^{7}
E Avanesyan	2	6^{4}
(Switzerland) S Bandecchi	6	6^{5}	6
WC	(Italy) M Paoletti	3	7^{7}	4
(Switzerland) Y In-Albon	6	6
8	(France) C Paquet	4	2
3	(Italy) L Bronzetti	6	6
(Lithuania) J Mikulskytė	1	3
(Hungary) F Stollár	6^{3}	1
(France) H Tan	7^{7}	6
(Czech Republic) L Fruhvirtová	5	0
(Romania) A Bogdan	7	6
A Blinkova	2	6	1
5	(Netherlands) A Rus	6	4	6

Second round
1	(Belgium) A Van Uytvanck	6	6
(Belgium) Y Bonaventure	2	2
(Switzerland) S Bandecchi	3	3
(Switzerland) Y In-Albon	6	6
3	(Italy) L Bronzetti	6	2	4
(France) H Tan	4	6	6
(Romania) A Bogdan	6	7^{7}
5	(Netherlands) A Rus	3	6^{5}

Quarterfinals
1	(Belgium) A Van Uytvanck	6	6
(Switzerland) Y In-Albon	4	2
(France) H Tan	6	5	6
(Romania) A Bogdan	2	7	3

Semifinals
1	(Belgium) A Van Uytvanck	7^{7}	6
(France) H Tan	6^{3}	3

=== Bottom half ===
First round
6	(France) D Parry	6	6
WC	(Italy) L Pigato	4	1
(Switzerland) J Züger	7^{7}	6
WC	(Italy) M Delai	6^{0}	1
(Netherlands) L Pattinama Kerkhove	4	6	4
(Germany) T Maria	6	4	6
(Spain) R Masarova	6	2	3
4	(United States) C Liu	4	6	6
7	(Belgium) G Minnen	6^{3}	2
SR	(Ukraine) K Baindl	7^{7}	6
Alt	A Fomina-Klotz	6^{3}	2
(Italy) F Di Sarra	7^{7}	6
V Diatchenko	6	6^{4}	2
(Italy) L Stefanini	4	7^{7}	6
(Italy) S Errani	6	3	7
2	(United States) M Brengle	2	6	5

Second round
6	(France) D Parry	6	4	6
(Switzerland) J Züger	1	6	4
(Germany) T Maria	7^{7}	6^{3}	6
4	(United States) C Liu	6^{3}	7^{7}	3
SR	(Ukraine) K Baindl	6	3	7
(Italy) F Di Sarra	3	6	5
(Italy) L Stefanini	3	6^{5}
(Italy) S Errani	6	7^{7}

Quarterfinals
6	(France) D Parry	6	3	6
(Germany) T Maria	4	6	3
SR	(Ukraine) K Baindl	6^{4}	4
(Italy) S Errani	7^{7}	6

Semifinals
6	(France) D Parry	3	4
(Italy) S Errani	6	6
