= 2022 Odlum Brown Vancouver Open – Women's singles =

Women's singles
- 2022 Odlum Brown Vancouver Open

Final
- Champion: (Greece) Valentini Grammatikopoulou
- Runner-up: (Italy) Lucia Bronzetti
- Score: 6–2, 6–4

Events
Singles	men	women
Doubles	men	women
- Vancouver Open

Heather Watson was the defending champion from when the tournament was last held in 2019 as part of the ITF Women's World Tennis Tour, but lost in the second round to Chloé Paquet.

Valentini Grammatikopoulou won the title, defeating Lucia Bronzetti in the final, 6–2, 6–4.

== Seeds ==
1. (United States) Madison Brengle (quarterfinals)
2. (Italy) Lucia Bronzetti (final)
3. (United States) Claire Liu (first round)
4. (China) Wang Xinyu (second round)
5. (Sweden) Rebecca Peterson (semifinals)
6. (Canada) Rebecca Marino (first round)
7. (Japan) Misaki Doi (first round)
8. (Italy) Elisabetta Cocciaretto (first round)

== Draw ==
Key

- Q = Qualifier
- WC = Wild card
- LL = Lucky loser
- Alt = Alternate
- ITF = ITF entry
- PR = Protected ranking
- SR = Special ranking
- SE = Special exempt
- JE = Junior exempt
- JR = Junior Accelerator Programme entrant
- CO = College Accelerator Programme entrant
- NG = Next Gen Accelerator Program entrant
- w/o = Walkover
- r = Retired
- d = Defaulted

=== Finals ===
Semifinals
(United States) Emma Navarro	4	6	1
Q	(Greece) Valentini Grammatikopoulou	6	3	6
5	(Sweden) Rebecca Peterson	2	2
2	(Italy) Lucia Bronzetti	6	6

Final
Q	(Greece) Valentini Grammatikopoulou	6	6
2	(Italy) Lucia Bronzetti	2	4

=== Top half ===
First Round
1	(United States) M Brengle	6	6
(Australia) L Cabrera	0	0
LL	(Japan) K Nara	2	3
SE	(United States) C Vandeweghe	6	6
WC	(Canada) E Bouchard	2	2
(Netherlands) A Hartono	6	6
(United States) E Navarro	3	6	7^{9}
6	(Canada) R Marino	6	4	6^{7}
3	(United States) C Liu	3	3
WC	(Canada) C Brace	6	6
(Australia) A Sharma	2	2
Q	(Greece) V Grammatikopoulou	6	6
(France) C Paquet	6	6
WC	(Canada) C Zhao	4	2
(United Kingdom) H Watson	3	7	6
8	(Italy) E Cocciaretto	6	5	2

Second Round
1	(United States) M Brengle	7	6
SE	(United States) C Vandeweghe	5	2
(Netherlands) A Hartono	6	3	2
(United States) E Navarro	2	6	6
WC	(Canada) C Brace	5	2
Q	(Greece) V Grammatikopoulou	7	6
(France) C Paquet	6	6
(United Kingdom) H Watson	4	2

Quarterfinals
1	(United States) M Brengle	7	2	3
(United States) E Navarro	5	6	6
Q	(Greece) V Grammatikopoulou	6	6
(France) C Paquet	3	4

Semifinals
(United States) E Navarro	4	6	1
Q	(Greece) V Grammatikopoulou	6	3	6

=== Bottom half ===
First Round
5	(Sweden) R Peterson	6	6
(Slovakia) AK Schmiedlová	2	2
(Greece) D Papamichail	1	3
Q	(United States) C Harrison	6	6
(Australia) M Inglis	7^{7}	1	6
(France) H Tan	6^{3}	6	1
(France) K Mladenovic	4	2
4	(China) Xin Wang	6	6
7	(Japan) M Doi	3	2
(Andorra) V Jiménez Kasintseva	6	6
(Poland) M Chwalińska	7^{7}	2	6^{4}
(United Kingdom) J Burrage	6^{2}	6	7^{7}
Q	(Australia) P Hon	6	6
WC	(Canada) M Stakusic	3	3
Q	(United Kingdom) Y Miyazaki	2	2
2	(Italy) L Bronzetti	6	6

Second Round
5	(Sweden) R Peterson	w/o
Q	(United States) C Harrison
(Australia) M Inglis	6	6
4	(China) Xin Wang	3	2
(Andorra) V Jiménez Kasintseva	7	6^{5}	7^{9}
(United Kingdom) J Burrage	5	7^{7}	6^{7}
Q	(Australia) P Hon	2	3
2	(Italy) L Bronzetti	6	6

Quarterfinals
5	(Sweden) R Peterson	6	7^{7}
(Australia) M Inglis	1	6^{5}
(Andorra) V Jiménez Kasintseva	5	1
2	(Italy) L Bronzetti	7	6

Semifinals
5	(Sweden) R Peterson	2	2
2	(Italy) L Bronzetti	6	6

== Qualifying ==
=== Seeds ===
1. (Australia) Priscilla Hon (qualified)
2. (United States) Asia Muhammad (qualifying competition)
3. (France) Elsa Jacquemot (first round)
4. (Japan) Nao Hibino (first round, retired)
5. (United Kingdom) Yuriko Miyazaki (qualified)
6. (Spain) Marina Bassols Ribera (first round)
7. (Japan) Kurumi Nara (qualifying competition, lucky loser)
8. (Greece) Valentini Grammatikopoulou (qualified)

=== Qualifiers ===
1. (Australia) Priscilla Hon
2. (Greece) Valentini Grammatikopoulou
3. (United Kingdom) Yuriko Miyazaki
4. (United States) Catherine Harrison

=== Lucky loser ===
1. (Japan) Kurumi Nara

=== Qualifying draw ===
==== First qualifier ====
First Round
1	(Australia) Priscilla Hon	6	7
(India) Karman Thandi	2	5
WC	(Canada) Bianca Fernandez	2	6	2
7	(Japan) Kurumi Nara	6	3	6

Qualifying Competition
1	(Australia) Priscilla Hon	6	6
7	(Japan) Kurumi Nara	1	2

==== Second qualifier ====
First Round
2	(United States) Asia Muhammad	6	6
WC	(Canada) Kayla Cross	1	2
(Japan) Nagi Hanatani	3	6	2
8	(Greece) Valentini Grammatikopoulou	6	1	6

Qualifying Competition
2	(United States) Asia Muhammad	6	5	2
8	(Greece) Valentini Grammatikopoulou	2	7	6

==== Third qualifier ====
First Round
3	(France) Elsa Jacquemot	4	0
(Hungary) Tímea Babos	6	6
(United Kingdom) Eden Silva	2	4
5	(United Kingdom) Yuriko Miyazaki	6	6

Qualifying Competition
(Hungary) Tímea Babos	4	6^{5}
5	(United Kingdom) Yuriko Miyazaki	6	7^{7}

==== Fourth qualifier ====
First Round
4	(Japan) Nao Hibino	7	4	1^{r}
(United States) Catherine Harrison	5	6	3
(United States) Maegan Manasse	4	6	6
6	(Spain) Marina Bassols Ribera	6	3	4

Qualifying Competition
(United States) Catherine Harrison	6^{1}	7^{7}	6
(United States) Maegan Manasse	7^{7}	6^{5}	2
