= 2022 Odlum Brown Vancouver Open – Women's doubles =

Women's doubles
- 2022 Odlum Brown Vancouver Open

Final
- Champions: (Japan) Miyu Kato (United States) Asia Muhammad
- Runners-up: (Hungary) Tímea Babos (United States) Angela Kulikov
- Score: 6–3, 7–5

Events
| Singles | men | women |
| Doubles | men | women |
- Odlum Brown Vancouver Open

Nao Hibino and Miyu Kato were the defending champions but chose to compete with different partners. Kato partnered alongside Asia Muhammad and successfully defended her title, defeating Tímea Babos and Angela Kulikov in the final, 6–3, 7–5.

Hibino partnered alongside Oksana Kalashnikova, but lost in the semifinals to Kato and Muhammad.

== Seeds ==
1. (Japan) Miyu Kato / (United States) Asia Muhammad (champions)
2. (Japan) Misaki Doi / (Sweden) Rebecca Peterson (first round)
3. (Japan) Nao Hibino / (Georgia (country)) Oksana Kalashnikova (semifinals)
4. (Hungary) Tímea Babos / (United States) Angela Kulikov (final)

== Draw ==
Key

- Q = Qualifier
- WC = Wild card
- LL = Lucky loser
- Alt = Alternate
- ITF = ITF entry
- PR = Protected ranking
- SR = Special ranking
- SE = Special exempt
- JE = Junior exempt
- JR = Junior Accelerator Programme entrant
- CO = College Accelerator Programme entrant
- NG = Next Gen Accelerator Program entrant
- w/o = Walkover
- r = Retired
- d = Defaulted

=== Draw ===
First round
1 | (Japan) M Kato (United States) A Muhammad | 6 | 7
(Spain) M Bassols Ribera (Greece) D Papamichail | 2 | 5
(Italy) L Bronzetti (Italy) E Cocciaretto | 1 | 7^{7} | [4]
WC | (Canada) E Bouchard (Canada) K Cross | 6 | 6^{3} | [10]
3 | (Japan) N Hibino (Georgia (country)) O Kalashnikova | 6 | 6
(Poland) M Chwalińska (Slovakia) AK Schmiedlová | 2 | 2
(Canada) R Marino (United Kingdom) H Watson | 6 | 6
(Brazil) I Gamarra Martins (United Kingdom) E Webley-Smith | 4 | 1
(Australia) A Sharma (United States) C Vandeweghe | 6 | 6
(Netherlands) A Hartono (Australia) O Tjandramulia | 4 | 2
(Greece) V Grammatikopoulou (Andorra) V Jiménez Kasintseva | 3 | 6^{6}
4 | (Hungary) T Babos (United States) A Kulikov | 6 | 7^{8}
(United Kingdom) J Burrage (Australia) M Inglis | 2 | 7 | [5]
(Germany) J Lohoff (Czech Republic) R Voráčová | 6 | 5 | [10]
(Australia) L Cabrera (Australia) P Hon | 7 | 6
2 | (Japan) M Doi (Sweden) R Peterson | 5 | 3

Quarterfinals
1 | (Japan) M Kato (United States) A Muhammad | 6 | 6
WC | (Canada) E Bouchard (Canada) K Cross | 1 | 3
3 | (Japan) N Hibino (Georgia (country)) O Kalashnikova | 6 | 6
(Canada) R Marino (United Kingdom) H Watson | 4 | 3
(Australia) A Sharma (United States) C Vandeweghe
4 | (Hungary) T Babos (United States) A Kulikov | w/o
(Germany) J Lohoff (Czech Republic) R Voráčová | 3 | 2
(Australia) L Cabrera (Australia) P Hon | 6 | 6

Semifinals
1 | (Japan) M Kato (United States) A Muhammad | 6 | 6
3 | (Japan) N Hibino (Georgia (country)) O Kalashnikova | 3 | 0
4 | (Hungary) T Babos (United States) A Kulikov | 7^{7} | 6
(Australia) L Cabrera (Australia) P Hon | 6^{2} | 3

Final
1 | (Japan) M Kato (United States) A Muhammad | 6 | 7
4 | (Hungary) T Babos (United States) A Kulikov | 3 | 5
