= 2022 Montevideo Open – Doubles =

Doubles
- 2022 Montevideo Open

Final
- Champions: (Brazil) Ingrid Gamarra Martins (Brazil) Luisa Stefani
- Runners-up: (United States) Quinn Gleason (France) Elixane Lechemia
- Score: 7–5, 6–7^{(6–8)}, [10–6]

Events
Singles	Doubles
- Montevideo Open

Irina Bara and Ekaterine Gorgodze were the defending champions, but chose to participate with different partners. Bara played alongside Réka Luca Jani but lost in the quarterfinals to Andrea Gámiz and Eva Vedder. Gorgodze played alongside Tímea Babos but lost in the first round to Amina Anshba and Darya Astakhova.

Ingrid Martins and Luisa Stefani won the title, defeating Quinn Gleason and Elixane Lechemia in the final, 7–5, 6–7^{(6–8)}, [10–6].

== Seeds ==
1. (Hungary) Tímea Babos / (Georgia (country)) Ekaterine Gorgodze (first round)
2. (Brazil) Ingrid Gamarra Martins / (Brazil) Luisa Stefani (champions)
3. (Venezuela) Andrea Gámiz / (Netherlands) Eva Vedder (semifinals)
4. (United States) Jessie Aney / (United States) Ingrid Neel (first round)

== Draw ==
Key

- Q = Qualifier
- WC = Wild card
- LL = Lucky loser
- Alt = Alternate
- ITF = ITF entry
- PR = Protected ranking
- SR = Special ranking
- SE = Special exempt
- JE = Junior exempt
- JR = Junior Accelerator Programme entrant
- CO = College Accelerator Programme entrant
- NG = Next Gen Accelerator Program entrant
- w/o = Walkover
- r = Retired
- d = Defaulted

=== Draw ===
First round
1	(Hungary) T Babos (Georgia (country)) E Gorgodze	3	1
A Anshba; D Astakhova	6	6
SR	(United States) Q Gleason (France) E Lechemia	7	6
(Serbia) N Stevanović (China) X You	5	3
4	(United States) J Aney (United States) I Neel	1	3
(Brazil) L Pigossi; D Shnaider	6	6
(France) L Jeanjean (Ukraine) V Strakhova	6^{4}	6	[10]
(United States) A Rogers (United States) C Rosca	7^{7}	1	[7]
WC	(Uruguay) G Grant (Bolivia) N Zeballos	6^{5}	6	[3]
(Romania) I Bara (Hungary) RL Jani	7^{7}	2	[10]
(Argentina) ML Carlé (Mexico) M Zacarías	0^{r}
3	(Venezuela) A Gámiz (Netherlands) E Vedder	3
(Spain) Y Cavallé Reimers (Spain) R Vicens Mas	6	6
(Brazil) R Pereira (Argentina) J Riera	2	2
(United States) H Baptiste (United States) W Osuigwe	2	2
2	(Brazil) I Gamarra Martins (Brazil) L Stefani	6	6

Quarterfinals
A Anshba; D Astakhova	3	0
SR	(United States) Q Gleason (France) E Lechemia	6	6
(Brazil) L Pigossi; D Shnaider	7^{7}	5	[3]
(France) L Jeanjean (Ukraine) V Strakhova	6^{5}	7	[10]
(Romania) I Bara (Hungary) RL Jani	3	4
3	(Venezuela) A Gámiz (Netherlands) E Vedder	6	6
(Spain) Y Cavallé Reimers (Spain) R Vicens Mas	1	2
2	(Brazil) I Gamarra Martins (Brazil) L Stefani	6	6

Semifinals
SR	(United States) Q Gleason (France) E Lechemia	6	2	[10]
(France) L Jeanjean (Ukraine) V Strakhova	4	6	[7]
3	(Venezuela) A Gámiz (Netherlands) E Vedder	1	2
2	(Brazil) I Gamarra Martins (Brazil) L Stefani	6	6

Final
SR	(United States) Q Gleason (France) E Lechemia	5	7^{8}	[6]
2	(Brazil) I Gamarra Martins (Brazil) L Stefani	7	6^{6}	[10]
