= 2022 Montevideo Open – Singles =

Singles
- 2022 Montevideo Open

Final
- Champion: Diana Shnaider
- Runner-up: (France) Léolia Jeanjean
- Score: 6–4, 6–4

Events
Singles	Doubles
- Montevideo Open

Diane Parry was the reigning champion, but chose not to participate.

Diana Shnaider won her first WTA 125K title, defeating Léolia Jeanjean in the final, 6–4, 6–4.

== Seeds ==
1. (Montenegro) Danka Kovinić (withdrew)
2. (Hungary) Panna Udvardy (withdrew)
3. (Slovenia) Tamara Zidanšek (first round)
4. (Italy) Sara Errani (first round)
5. (Hungary) Réka Luca Jani (first round)
6. (Ukraine) Kateryna Baindl (semifinals)
7. (Brazil) Laura Pigossi (first round)
8. (South Korea) Jang Su-jeong (first round)
9. (Andorra) Victoria Jiménez Kasintseva (first round)
10. (France) Léolia Jeanjean (final)

== Draw ==
Key

- Q = Qualifier
- WC = Wild card
- LL = Lucky loser
- Alt = Alternate
- ITF = ITF entry
- PR = Protected ranking
- SR = Special ranking
- SE = Special exempt
- JE = Junior exempt
- JR = Junior Accelerator Programme entrant
- CO = College Accelerator Programme entrant
- NG = Next Gen Accelerator Program entrant
- w/o = Walkover
- r = Retired
- d = Defaulted

=== Finals ===
Semifinals
6	(Ukraine) Kateryna Baindl	3	2
Diana Shnaider	6	6
(Turkey) İpek Öz	0	3
10	(France) Léolia Jeanjean	6	6

Final
Diana Shnaider	6	6
10	(France) Léolia Jeanjean	4	4

=== Top half ===
First round
9	(Andorra) V Jiménez Kasintseva	6^{3}	3
(France) C Burel	7^{7}	6
(Serbia) N Stevanović	4	3
(United States) A Li	6	6
(Argentina) ML Carlé	3	2
(Czech Republic) B Fruhvirtová	6	6
(United States) E Navarro	6	5	3
6	(Ukraine) K Baindl	4	7	6
4	(Italy) S Errani	6^{3}	5
D Shnaider	7^{7}	7
Q	(Hungary) T Babos	4	1
Q	(Colombia) E Arango	6	6
LL	(Spain) Y Cavallé Reimers	3	4
WC	(Argentina) J Riera	6	6
(United States) H Baptiste	3	7^{7}	6
7	(Brazil) L Pigossi	6	6^{1}	1

Second round
(France) C Burel	3	6	6
(United States) A Li	6	3	3
(Czech Republic) B Fruhvirtová	4	0
6	(Ukraine) K Baindl	6	6
D Shnaider	6	6
Q	(Colombia) E Arango	1	4
WC	(Argentina) J Riera	1	6^{4}
(United States) H Baptiste	6	7^{7}

Quarterfinals
(France) C Burel	6	1	1
6	(Ukraine) K Baindl	2	6	6
D Shnaider	6	6
(United States) H Baptiste	4	2

Semifinals
6	(Ukraine) K Baindl	3	2
D Shnaider	6	6

=== Bottom half ===
First round
8	(South Korea) S-j Jang	1	6	6^{6}
(Spain) R Vicens Mas	6	2	7^{8}
WC	(Uruguay) G Grant	2	1
(Turkey) İ Öz	6	6
Q	(Netherlands) E Vedder	2	6	6
(Mexico) M Zacarías	6	3	4
D Astakhova	7	3	6
3	(Slovenia) T Zidanšek	5	6	4
5	(Hungary) RL Jani	1	4
Q	(China) X You	6	6
(Romania) I Bara	1	6	6
(Georgia (country)) E Gorgodze	6	4	0
WC	(Argentina) M Capurro Taborda	6	2	2
(France) H Tan	4	6	6
WC	(Argentina) S Sierra	0	0
10	(France) L Jeanjean	6	6

Second round
(Spain) R Vicens Mas	2	7	4
(Turkey) İ Öz	6	5	6
Q	(Netherlands) E Vedder	4	6	0
D Astakhova	6	3	6
Q	(China) X You	4	2
(Romania) I Bara	6	6
(France) H Tan	6^{6}	1
10	(France) L Jeanjean	7^{8}	6

Quarterfinals
(Turkey) İ Öz	7	6
D Astakhova	5	3
(Romania) I Bara	6	4	2
10	(France) L Jeanjean	4	6	6

Semifinals
(Turkey) İ Öz	0	3
10	(France) L Jeanjean	6	6

== Qualifying ==
=== Seeds ===
1. (Spain) Rosa Vicens Mas (moved to main draw)
2. (Netherlands) Eva Vedder (qualified)
3. (China) You Xiaodi (qualified)
4. (Spain) Yvonne Cavallé Reimers (qualifying competition, lucky loser)
5. (United States) Whitney Osuigwe (qualifying competition)
6. (Colombia) Emiliana Arango (qualified)
7. (Uruguay) Josefina Soldo (qualifying competition)
8. (Uruguay) Juliana Rodriguez (qualifying competition)

=== Qualifiers ===
1. (Hungary) Tímea Babos
2. (Netherlands) Eva Vedder
3. (China) You Xiaodi
4. (Colombia) Emiliana Arango

=== Lucky loser ===
1. (Spain) Yvonne Cavallé Reimers

=== Draw ===
==== First qualifier ====
Qualifying competition
Alt	(Hungary) Tímea Babos	6	6
8/WC	(Uruguay) Juliana Rodríguez	3	1

==== Second qualifier ====
Qualifying competition
2	(Netherlands) Eva Vedder	6	6
7/WC	(Uruguay) Josefina Soldo	1	0

==== Third qualifier ====
Qualifying competition
3	(China) You Xiaodi	6	6
5	(United States) Whitney Osuigwe	4	4

==== Fourth qualifier ====
Qualifying competition
4	(Spain) Yvonne Cavallé Reimers	4	6	4
6	(Colombia) Emiliana Arango	6	3	6
