= Han Na-lae =

South Korean tennis player

Han Na-lae 한나래
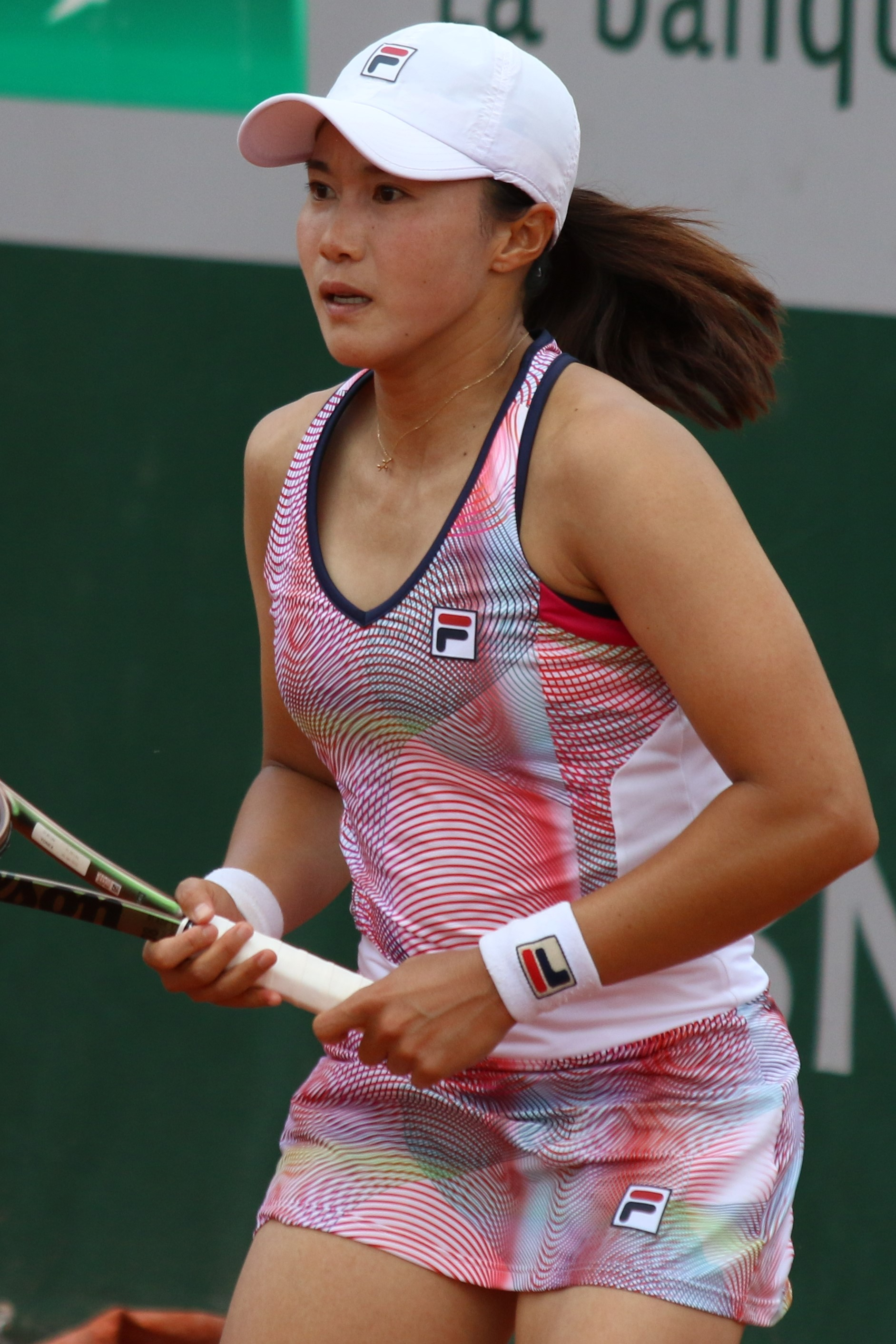
- Han at the 2022 French Open
- Country (sports): South Korea
- Residence: Incheon, South Korea
- Born: 6 July 1992 (age 33) Incheon
- Height: 1.65 m (5 ft 5 in)
- Turned pro: 2011
- Retired: 2024
- Plays: Left (two-handed both sides)
- Prize money: US$ 672,435

Singles
- Career record: 356–262
- Career titles: 13 ITF
- Highest ranking: No. 149 (17 June 2019)

Grand Slam singles results
- Australian Open: 1R (2020)
- French Open: Q1 (2017, 2019, 2021, 2022, 2023)
- Wimbledon: Q1 (2017, 2021, 2022, 2023)
- US Open: 1R (2023)

Doubles
- Career record: 276–148
- Career titles: 1 WTA, 2 WTA Challengers
- Highest ranking: No. 95 (7 November 2022)

Team competitions
- Fed Cup: 22–21

- Han Na-lae
- Hangul: 한나래
- RR: Han Narae
- MR: Han Narae

Han Na-lae (Korean: 한나래; born 6 July 1992) is a South Korean former professional tennis player. Han has a career-high singles ranking of world No. 149, achieved June 2019, and a doubles ranking of No. 95, set on 7 November 2022. Han won one doubles title on the WTA Tour and two doubles titles on the Challenger Tour, along with 13 singles titles and 28 doubles titles (nine alongside Yoo Mi and four with Jang Su-jeong, both fellow Korean players) on the ITF Circuit. A left-hander, she hits both forehand and backhand with two hands.

== Career ==
Han made her WTA Tour main-draw singles debut at the 2014 Korea Open.

She made her Grand Slam tournament main-draw debut at the 2020 Australian Open having received a wildcard, but lost in the first round to Tamara Zidanšek.

At the 2017 Korea Open, Han defeated top 50 player Kristýna Plíšková as one of her biggest victories.

Partnering Choi Ji-hee, she won the doubles title at the 2018 Korea Open, defeating Hsieh Shu-ying and Hsieh Su-wei in the final. The pair repeated the feat at the 2021 Korea Open, this time overcoming Valentini Grammatikopoulou and Réka Luca Jani in the championship match.

Partnering Jang Su-jeong, Han won the doubles title at the 2023 WTA 125 Veneto Open, defeating Weronika Falkowska and Katarzyna Piter in the final.

Ranked No. 241 at the 2023 US Open, she qualified for the main draw making her second appearance at a major, losing to ninth seed Markéta Vondroušová in the first round.

Han announced in May 2024 that she would retire at the end of the season. She made her final appearance at the Korean National Sports Festival.

== Performance timeline ==
Key
W	F	SF	QF	#R	RR	Q#	DNQ	A	NH

(W) winner; (F) finalist; (SF) semifinalist; (QF) quarterfinalist; (#R) rounds 4, 3, 2, 1; (RR) round-robin stage; (Q#) qualification round; (DNQ) did not qualify; (A) absent; (NH) not held; (SR) strike rate (events won / competed); (W–L) win–loss record.
To avoid confusion and double counting, these charts are updated at the conclusion of a tournament or when the player's participation has ended.

Only main-draw results in WTA Tour, Grand Slam tournaments, Fed Cup/Billie Jean King Cup and Olympic Games are included in win–loss record.

=== Singles ===
Current through the 2023 US Open.

Tournament	2014	2015	2016	2017	2018	2019	2020	2021	2022	2023	SR	W–L
Grand Slam tournaments
Australian Open	A	A	A	Q1	A	Q1	1R	Q2	A	Q2	0 / 1	0–1
French Open	A	A	A	Q1	A	Q1	A	Q1	Q1	Q1	0 / 0	0–0
Wimbledon	A	A	A	Q1	A	A	NH	Q1	Q1	Q1	0 / 0	0–0
US Open	A	Q1	Q2	Q1	A	Q2	A	A	A	1R	0 / 1	0–1
Win–loss	0–0	0–0	0–0	0–0	0–0	0–0	0–1	0–0	0–0	0–1	0 / 2	0–2
National representation
Billie Jean King Cup (Note: Formerly known as Fed Cup until 2020.)	Z1	Z1	Z1	Z1	Z1	Z1	Z1 (Note: Edition is split into the two years due to COVID-19.)		Z1		0 / 0	14–10
WTA 1000
Canadian Open	A	A	A	A	A	A	NH	A	A	Q1	0 / 0	0–0
Career statistics
Tournaments	1	1	2	1	1	1	1	1	1	2	Career total: 12	
Titles	0	0	0	0	0	0	0	0	0	0	Career total: 0	
Finals	0	0	0	0	0	0	0	0	0	0	Career total: 0	
Overall win–loss	1–2	2–2	3–3	1–3	1–3	2–2	3–3	0–1	4–1	1–2	0 / 12	18–22
Year–end ranking (Note: 2009: WTA ranking–885, 2010: WTA ranking–958, 2011: WTA ranking–483, 2012: WTA ranking–806, 2013: WTA ranking–483.)	273	276	179	256	216	179	204	273	176	261	$662,782	

== WTA Tour finals ==
=== Doubles: 1 (title) ===
Legend WTA 500 WTA 250 (1–0)	Finals by surface Hard (1–0) Grass (0–0)

Result	Date	Tournament	Tier	Surface	Partner	Opponents	Score
Win	Sep 2018	Korea Open, South Korea	International (Note: The WTA International tournaments were reclassified as WTA 250 tournaments in 2021.)	Hard	(South Korea) Choi Ji-hee	(Chinese Taipei) Hsieh Shu-ying (Chinese Taipei) Hsieh Su-wei	6–3, 6–2

== WTA 125 finals ==
=== Doubles: 2 (2 titles) ===
Result	W–L	Date	Tournament	Surface	Partner	Opponents	Score
Win	1–0	Dec 2021	Korea Open, South Korea	Hard (i)	(South Korea) Choi Ji-hee	(Greece) Valentini Grammatikopoulou (Hungary) Réka Luca Jani	6–4, 6–4
Win	2–0	Jun 2023	Veneto Open, Italy	Grass	(South Korea) Jang Su-jeong	(Poland) Weronika Falkowska (Poland) Katarzyna Piter	6–3, 3–6, [10–6]

== ITF Circuit titles ==
=== Singles: 25 (13 titles, 12 runner-ups) ===
Legend $60,000 tournaments (0–1) $25,000 tournaments (11–8) $10/15,000 tournaments (2–3)	Finals by surface Hard (13–12)

Result	W–L	Date	Tournament	Tier	Surface	Opponent	Score
Loss	0–1	May 2011	ITF Hyderabad, India	10,000	Hard	(Israel) Keren Shlomo	1–6, 4–6
Win	1–1	Aug 2011	ITF Taipei, Taiwan	10,000	Hard	(Japan) Emi Mutaguchi	6–3, ret.
Loss	1–2	May 2013	ITF Seoul, South Korea	15,000	Hard	(China) Zhou Yimiao	2–6, 1–6
Win	2–2	Oct 2013	ITF Seoul, South Korea	25,000	Hard	(South Korea) Kim Da-hye	6–4, 6–4
Loss	2–3	Jun 2014	ITF Gimcheon, South Korea	10,000	Hard	(South Korea) Lee So-ra	7–6^{(7–2)}, 2–6, 6–4
Win	3–3	Mar 2015	ITF Port Pirie, Australia	15,000	Hard	(South Korea) Jang Su-jeong	3–6, 6–4, 6–2
Win	4–3	Dec 2015	ITF Bangkok, Thailand	25,000	Hard	(Japan) Risa Ozaki	6–2, 6–4
Win	5–3	May 2016	ITF Goyang, South Korea	25,000	Hard	(United Kingdom) Harriet Dart	6–3, 6–2
Loss	5–4	May 2016	Incheon Open, South Korea	25,000	Hard	(South Korea) Jeong Su-nam	4–6, 6–4, 4–6
Win	6–4	Jun 2016	ITF Yuxi, China	25,000	Hard	(China) Lu Jiaxi	5–7, 6–1, 6–3
Loss	6–5	Mar 2017	Kōfu International Open, Japan	25,000	Hard	(Japan) Mayo Hibi	7–5, 3–6, 2–6
Win	7–5	May 2017	Incheon Open, South Korea	25,000	Hard	(Thailand) Luksika Kumkhum	7–6^{(7–2)}, 7–5
Loss	7–6	May 2018	Incheon Open, South Korea	25,000	Hard	(Chinese Taipei) Liang En-shuo	2–6, 6–0, 5–7
Win	8–6	Jun 2018	ITF Daegu, South Korea	25,000	Hard	(Japan) Misaki Doi	5–2 ret.
Loss	8–7	Oct 2018	Liuzhou Open, China	60,000	Hard	(China) Wang Yafan	4–6, 2–6
Loss	8–8	Jan 2019	ITF Singapore	25,000	Hard	(China) Zhu Lin	2–6, 3–6
Win	9–8	Apr 2019	ITF Osaka, Japan	25,000	Hard	(China) Wang Xiyu	7–5, 3–6, 6–3
Win	10–8	May 2019	Incheon Open, South Korea	25,000	Hard	(Russia) Anastasia Gasanova	6–3, 6–0
Win	11–8	Jun 2019	ITF Daegu, South Korea	25,000	Hard	(Japan) Haruna Arakawa	6–1, 6–2
Win	12–8	Jan 2022	ITF Monastir, Tunisia	25,000	Hard	(Canada) Katherine Sebov	6–3, 6–2
Loss	12–9	Jan 2022	ITF Monastir, Tunisia	25,000	Hard	(Uzbekistan) Nigina Abduraimova	3–6, 6–4, 6–7^{(7–9)}
Loss	12–10	Jun 2022	ITF Changwon, South Korea	25,000	Hard	(Japan) Kurumi Nara	3–6, 1–6
Win	13–10	Nov 2022	Yokohama Challenger, Japan	25,000	Hard	(Japan) Miyu Kato	7–5, 6–0
Loss	13–11	Apr 2023	Kōfu International Open, Japan	25,000	Hard	(South Korea) Jang Su-jeong	6–2, 3–6, 2–6
Loss	13–12	Apr 2023	ITF Osaka, Japan	25,000	Hard	(Australia) Maddison Inglis	3–6, 6–7^{(2–7)}

=== Doubles: 49 (28 titles, 21 runner-ups) ===
Legend $100,000 tournaments (1–1) $80,000 tournaments (1–0) $60,000 tournaments (1–3) $40,000 tournaments (0–1) $25,000 tournaments (18–11) $10/15,000 tournaments (7–5)	Finals by surface Hard (25–21) Clay (3–0)

Result	W–L	Date	Tournament	Tier	Surface	Partner	Opponents	Score
Loss	0–1	Nov 2009	ITF Manila, Philippines	10,000	Hard	(South Korea) Yoo Mi	(South Korea) Kim Sun-jung (South Korea) Lee Ye-ra	4–6, 6–4, [6–10]
Win	1–1	Nov 2009	ITF Manila, Philippines	10,000	Hard	(South Korea) Yoo Mi	(Philippines) Czarina Arevalo (Germany) Katharina Lehnert	6–0, 6–3
Win	2–1	May 2011	ITF Hyderabad, India	10,000	Hard	(South Korea) Lee So-ra	(India) Sowjanya Bavisetti (India) Natasha Palha	6–3, 6–2
Loss	2–2	Sep 2012	ITF Yeongwol, South Korea	10,000	Hard	(South Korea) Jang Su-jeong	(South Korea) Kim Sun-jung (South Korea) Yu Min-hwa	3–6, 5–7
Win	3–2	Feb 2013	ITF Antalya, Turkey	10,000	Clay	(South Korea) Lee Jin-a	(Spain) Eva Fernández Brugués (Bulgaria) Isabella Shinikova	6–3, 6–3
Loss	3–3	Mar 2013	ITF Kōfu, Japan	10,000	Hard	(China) Yang Zi	(Japan) Akari Inoue (Japan) Hiroko Kuwata	6–3, 5–7, [7–10]
Win	4–3	Mar 2013	ITF Nishitama, Japan	10,000	Hard	(South Korea) Kang Seo-kyung	(Japan) Makoto Ninomiya (Japan) Eri Hozumi	6–4, 6–7^{(4)}, [10–6]
Loss	4–4	May 2013	ITF Goyang, Korea	25,000	Hard	(South Korea) Yoo Mi	(Japan) Nao Hibino (Japan) Akiko Omae	4–6, 4–6
Win	5–4	Jun 2013	ITF Gimcheon, South Korea	10,000	Hard	(South Korea) Yoo Mi	(South Korea) Kim Yun-hee (South Korea) Yoo Jin	6–3, 6–3
Win	6–4	Nov 2013	ITF Seoul, South Korea	25,000	Hard	(South Korea) Yoo Mi	(South Korea) Kim Sun-jung (South Korea) Yu Min-hwa	2–6, 6–3, [10–6]
Win	7–4	Mar 2014	ITF Shenzhen, China	10,000	Hard	(South Korea) Yoo Mi	(Russia) Natela Dzalamidze (Russia) Polina Leykina	6–1, 6–1
Loss	7–5	May 2014	ITF Seoul, South Korea	15,000	Hard	(South Korea) Yoo Mi	(China) Liu Chang (China) Tian Ran	4–6, 7–6^{(5)}, [6–10]
Win	8–5	May 2014	Incheon Open, South Korea	25,000	Hard	(South Korea) Yoo Mi	(Thailand) Noppawan Lertcheewakarn (Turkey) Melis Sezer	6–1, 6–1
Loss	8–6	Jul 2014	ITF Gimcheon, Korea	10,000	Hard	(South Korea) Yoo Mi	(South Korea) Choi Ji-hee (Japan) Makoto Ninomiya	3–6, 6–7^{(6)}
Win	9–6	Jul 2014	ITF Phuket, Thailand	25,000	Hard (i)	(South Korea) Yoo Mi	(Japan) Akari Inoue (Chinese Taipei) Lee Ya-hsuan	6–4, 6–3
Loss	9–7	Jul 2014	ITF Phuket, Thailand	25,000	Hard (i)	(South Korea) Yoo Mi	(Thailand) Nicha Lertpitaksinchai (Thailand) Peangtarn Plipuech	3–6, 7–6^{(5)}, [9–11]
Loss	9–8	Apr 2015	ITF Shenzhen, China	25,000	Hard	(South Korea) Jang Su-jeong	(Thailand) Noppawan Lertcheewakarn (China) Lu Jiajing	4–6, 5–7
Win	10–8	May 2015	ITF Changwon, South Korea	25,000	Hard	(South Korea) Yoo Mi	(Japan) Mana Ayukawa (Japan) Makoto Ninomiya	6–3, 6–1
Win	11–8	Jun 2015	ITF Goyang, South Korea	25,000	Hard	(South Korea) Yoo Mi	(China) Liu Chang (China) Lu Jiajing	6–1, 7–5
Win	12–8	Jul 2015	ITF Zhengzhou, China	25,000	Hard	(South Korea) Jang Su-jeong	(China) Liu Chang (Hong Kong) Zhang Ling	6–3, 6–0
Loss	12–9	Feb 2016	ITF Perth, Australia	25,000	Hard	(South Korea) Jang Su-jeong	(Australia) Tammi Patterson (Poland) Katarzyna Piter	6–4, 2–6, [3–10]
Win	13–9	Apr 2016	ITF Changwon, South Korea	25,000	Hard	(South Korea) Yoo Mi	(China) Lu Jiajing (Belgium) Elise Mertens	4–6, 6–3, [10–7]
Win	14–9	Apr 2017	Kōfu International Open, Japan	25,000	Hard	(Thailand) Luksika Kumkhum	(Japan) Erina Hayashi (Japan) Robu Kajitani	6–3, 6–0
Loss	14–10	Apr 2017	ITF Kashiwa, Japan	25,000	Hard	(Thailand) Peangtarn Plipuech	(South Korea) Jang Su-jeong (Chinese Taipei) Lee Ya-hsuan	3–6, 6–3, [4–10]
Loss	14–11	Apr 2018	ITF Kashiwa, Japan	25,000	Hard	(Japan) Robu Kajitani	(Japan) Kyōka Okamura (Japan) Ayaka Okuno	2–6, 2–6
Win	15–11	May 2018	ITF Goyang, South Korea	25,000	Hard	(South Korea) Lee So-ra	(Norway) Ulrikke Eikeri (Japan) Akiko Omae	6–2, 5–7, [10–2]
Win	16–11	May 2018	Incheon Open, South Korea	25,000	Hard	(South Korea) Kim Na-ri	(Chinese Taipei) Chang Kai-chen (Chinese Taipei) Hsu Ching-wen	5–0 ret.
Loss	16–12	Jun 2018	ITF Singapore	25,000	Hard	(South Korea) Lee So-ra	(Japan) Haruka Kaji (Japan) Akiko Omae	5–7, 2–6
Win	17–12	Mar 2019	Yokohama Challenger, Japan	25,000	Hard	(South Korea) Choi Ji-hee	(India) Rutuja Bhosale (Japan) Akiko Omae	6–1, 7–5
Win	18–12	Apr 2019	ITF Osaka, Japan	25,000	Hard	(South Korea) Choi Ji-hee	(Chinese Taipei) Hsu Ching-wen (China) Wang Xiyu	6–4, 5–7, [10–8]
Win	19–12	Jun 2019	Incheon Open, Korea	25,000	Hard	(South Korea) Choi Ji-hee	(Japan) Kanako Morisaki (Japan) Minori Yonehara	6–3, 6–3
Loss	19–13	Jun 2019	ITF Deagu, Korea	25,000	Hard	(South Korea) Choi Ji-hee	(Chinese Taipei) Hsieh Yu-chieh (Chinese Taipei) Lee Pei-chi	3–6, 6–7^{(5)}
Win	20–13	Nov 2019	Tokyo Open, Japan	100,000	Hard	(South Korea) Choi Ji-hee	(Japan) Haruka Kaji (Japan) Junri Namigata	6–3, 6–3
Win	21–13	Mar 2021	ITF Antalya, Turkey	15,000	Clay	(South Korea) Lee So-ra	(United States) Jessie Aney (South Korea) Park So-hyun	4–6, 7–5, [10–4]
Loss	21–14	Jun 2021	ITF Madrid, Spain	25,000	Hard	(Japan) Mana Ayukawa	(Australia) Destanee Aiava (Australia) Olivia Gadecki	3–6, 3–6
Win	22–14	Jun 2021	ITF Lisbon, Portugal	25,000	Hard	(Japan) Momoko Kobori	(Brazil) Ingrid Martins (China) Ma Shuyue	6–3, 6–1
Win	23–14	Jan 2022	ITF Monastir, Tunisia	25,000	Hard	(Hong Kong) Eudice Chong	(Belarus) Anna Kubareva (Russia) Maria Timofeeva	7–5, 6–3
Win	24–14	Mar 2022	Clay Court International, Australia	60,000	Clay	(South Korea) Jang Su-jeong	(Japan) Yuki Naito (Japan) Moyuka Uchijima	3–6, 6–2, [10–5]
Win	25–14	Jun 2022	ITF Changwon, South Korea	25,000	Hard	(South Korea) Choi Ji-hee	(Chinese Taipei) Lee Ya-hsuan (Chinese Taipei) Wu Fang-hsien	6–3, 4–6, [15–13]
Win	26–14	Jun 2022	Incheon Open, South Korea	25,000	Hard	(South Korea) Choi Ji-hee	(Chinese Taipei) Lee Ya-hsuan (Chinese Taipei) Wu Fang-hsien	5–7, 6–4, [10–6]
Loss	26–15	Jul 2022	ITF Nur-Sultan, Kazakhstan	25,000	Hard	(South Korea) Choi Ji-hee	(Japan) Momoko Kobori (India) Ankita Raina	2–6, 6–3, [8–10]
Loss	26–16	Aug 2022	Landisville Challenge, United States	100,000	Hard	(South Korea) Jang Su-jeong	(United States) Sophie Chang (Kazakhstan) Anna Danilina	6–2, 6–7^{(4)}, [9–11]
Loss	26–17	Aug 2022	Bronx Open, United States	60,000	Hard	(Japan) Hiroko Kuwata	(Russia) Anna Blinkova (Switzerland) Simona Waltert	3–6, 3–6
Loss	26–18	Oct 2022	Playford International, Australia	60,000	Hard	(Indonesia) Priska Madelyn Nugroho	(Australia) Alexandra Bozovic (Australia) Talia Gibson	5–7, 4–6
Loss	26–19	Nov 2022	Yokohama Challenger, Japan	25,000	Hard	(Japan) Mai Hontama	(Japan) Saki Imamura (Japan) Naho Sato	4–6, 6–4, [5–10]
Loss	26–20	Mar 2023	ITF Astana, Kazakhstan	40,000	Hard (i)	(South Korea) Jang Su-jeong	(Kazakhstan) Anna Danilina (Belarus) Iryna Shymanovich	4–6, 7–6^{(8)}, [7–10]
Loss	26–21	Mar 2023	Nur-Sultan Challenger, Kazakhstan	60,000	Hard (i)	(South Korea) Jang Su-jeong	(Russia) Polina Kudermetova (Russia) Anastasia Tikhonova	6–2, 3–6, [7–10]
Win	27–21	Apr 2023	Kofu International, Japan	25,000	Hard	(South Korea) Jang Su-jeong	(Spain) Georgina Garcia-Perez (Japan) Eri Hozumi	6–0, 6–4
Win	28–21	May 2023	Kangaroo Cup, Japan	80,000	Hard	(South Korea) Jang Su-jeong	(Chinese Taipei) Lee Ya-hsuan (Chinese Taipei) Wu Fang-hsien	7–6^{3}, 2–6, [10–8]
