= Gaiba =

- Comune
- Comune di Gaiba
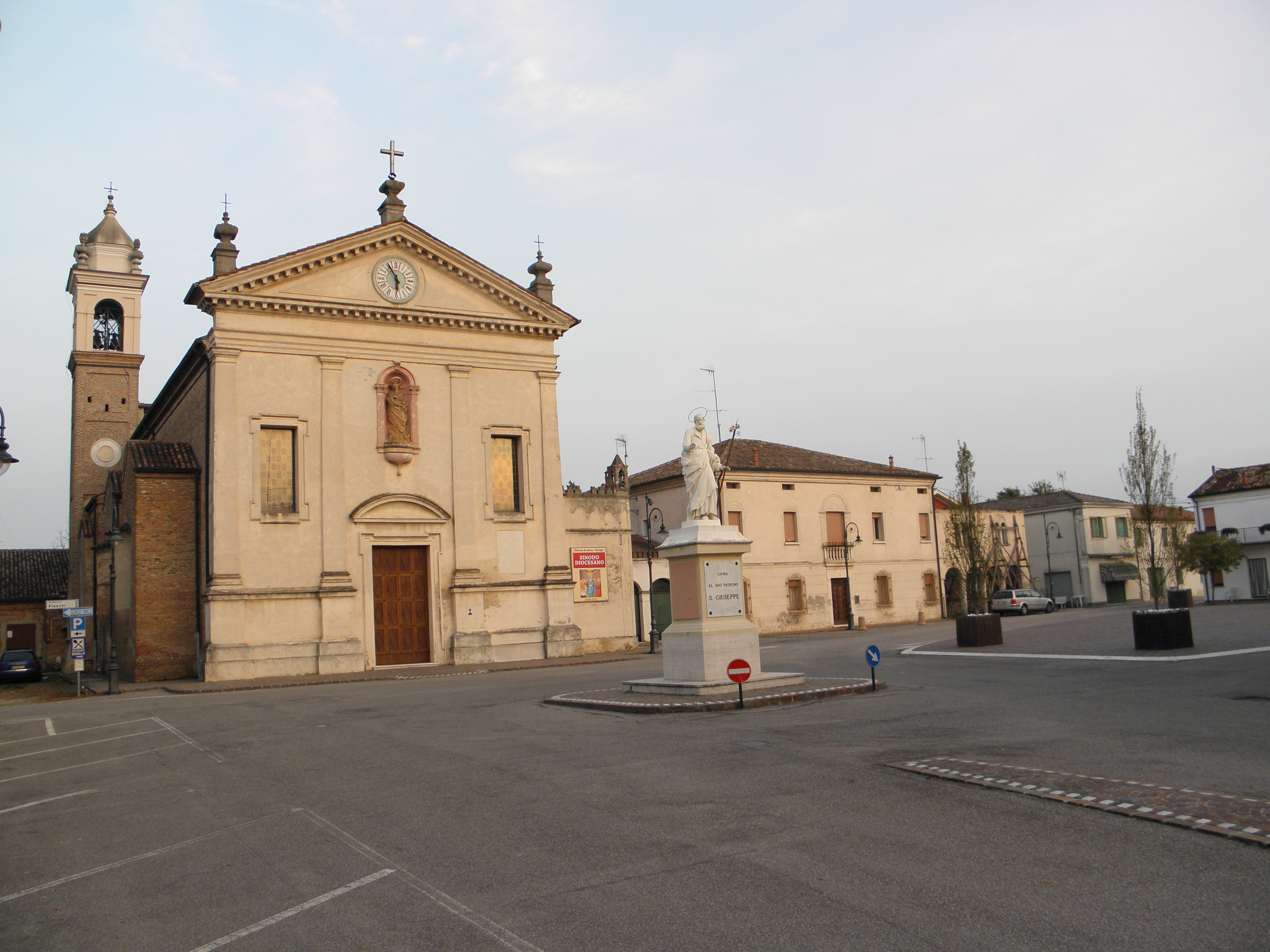
- Piazza San Giuseppe (Saint Joseph square) with the monument of saint and the parish church

- Coat of arms

- Location within Italy Location within Veneto
- Coordinates: 44°57′N 11°29′E
- Country: Italy
- Region: Veneto
- Province: Rovigo (RO)
- Frazioni: Borgata Canova, Fortini, Nuova, Surchio, Tommaselle

Government
  - Mayor: Nicola Zanca

Area
  - Total: 12.1 km^{2} (4.7 sq mi)
- Elevation: 9 m (30 ft)

Population (1 October 2011)
  - Total: 1,109
  - Density: 91.7/km^{2} (237/sq mi)
- Time zone: UTC+1 (CET)
  - Summer (DST): UTC+2 (CEST)
- Postal code: 45030
- Dialing code: 0425

Gaiba is a comune (municipality) in the province of Rovigo in the Italian region Veneto, located about 80 kilometres (50 mi) southwest of Venice and about 25 kilometres (16 mi) southwest of Rovigo.

== Twin towns ==
- Alwernia, Poland
- Collegno, Italy
- Rocchetta Sant'Antonio, Italy
