= 2022 Orlando USTA Pro Circuit Event =

Tennis tournament

- Date: 24–30 January 2022
- Edition: 3rd (on hard court)
- Category: ITF Women's World Tennis Tour
- Prize money: $60,000
- Surface: Hard
- Location: Orlando, Florida, United States

Champions

Singles
- (China) Zheng Qinwen

Doubles
- (United States) Hailey Baptiste / (United States) Whitney Osuigwe
← 2021 ·	Orlando USTA Pro Circuit Event	· 2022 →

The 2022 Orlando USTA Pro Circuit Event was a professional tennis tournament played on outdoor hard courts. It was the third edition of the tournament which was part of the 2022 ITF Women's World Tennis Tour. It took place in Orlando, Florida, United States between 24 and 30 January 2022.

== Singles main-draw entrants ==
=== Seeds ===
Country	Player	Rank^{1}	Seed
JPN	Misaki Doi	75	1
CHN	Zheng Qinwen	108	2
MEX	Renata Zarazúa	130	3
CHN	Wang Xiyu	139	4
CHN	Yuan Yue	156	5
~~USA~~	~~CoCo Vandeweghe~~	~~161~~	~~6~~
SUI	Leonie Küng	162	7
USA	Hailey Baptiste	165	8

- ^{1} Rankings are as of 17 January 2022.

=== Other entrants ===
The following players received wildcards into the singles main draw:

- (United States) Elvina Kalieva
- (United States) Ashlyn Krueger
- (United States) Whitney Osuigwe
- (United States) Sachia Vickery

The following players received entry from the qualifying draw:

- (United States) Sophie Chang
- (United States) Catherine Harrison
- (Belarus) Vera Lapko
- (Germany) Tatjana Maria
- (United States) Robin Montgomery
- (Burundi) Sada Nahimana
- (France) Marine Partaud
- (Mexico) Marcela Zacarías

The following players received entry as lucky losers:

- (Chinese Taipei) Hsu Chieh-yu
- (United States) Danielle Lao

== Champions ==
=== Singles ===
- (China) Zheng Qinwen def. (United States) Christina McHale, 6–0, 6–1

=== Doubles ===
- (United States) Hailey Baptiste / (United States) Whitney Osuigwe def. (United States) Angela Kulikov / (United States) Rianna Valdes, 7–6^{(9–7)}, 7–5
