= 2023 Orlando USTA Pro Circuit Event =

Tennis tournament

- Date: 6–12 February 2023
- Edition: 6th (on hard court)
- Category: ITF Women's World Tennis Tour
- Prize money: $60,000
- Surface: Hard / Outdoor
- Location: Orlando, United States

Champions

Singles
- (Australia) Kimberly Birrell

Doubles
- (United States) Ashlyn Krueger / (United States) Robin Montgomery
← 2022 ·	Orlando USTA Pro Circuit Event	· 2024 →

The 2023 Orlando USTA Pro Circuit Event was a professional tennis tournament played on outdoor hard courts. It was the sixth edition of the tournament which was part of the 2023 ITF Women's World Tennis Tour. It took place in Orlando, Florida, United States between 6 and 12 February 2023.

== Champions ==
=== Singles ===
- (Australia) Kimberly Birrell def. (Sweden) Rebecca Peterson, 6–3, 6–0

=== Doubles ===
- (United States) Ashlyn Krueger / (United States) Robin Montgomery def. (Netherlands) Arianne Hartono / (Netherlands) Eva Vedder, 7–5, 6–1

== Singles main draw entrants ==
=== Seeds ===
Country	Player	Rank^{1}	Seed
HUN	Panna Udvardy	95	1
USA	Elizabeth Mandlik	135	2
SWE	Rebecca Peterson	143	3
ARG	María Lourdes Carlé	147	4
AUS	Kimberly Birrell	150	5
USA	Ann Li	167	6
USA	Caroline Dolehide	168	7
USA	Ashlyn Krueger	178	8

- ^{1} Rankings are as of 30 January 2023.

=== Other entrants ===
The following players received wildcards into the singles main draw:

- (United States) Jenna DeFalco
- (United States) Francesca Di Lorenzo
- (United States) Quinn Gleason
- (United States) Hina Inoue

The following player received entry as a special exempt:

- (Czech Republic) Gabriela Knutson

The following player received entry using a special ranking:

- (United States) Irina Hartman

The following players received entry from the qualifying draw:

- (Japan) Haruna Arakawa
- (United States) Samantha Crawford
- (Malta) Francesca Curmi
- (United States) Liv Hovde
- (Germany) Sabine Lisicki
- (United States) Anna Rogers
- (Switzerland) Lulu Sun
- (Mexico) Renata Zarazúa
