= 2022 Orlando USTA Pro Circuit Event – Doubles =

Doubles
- 2022 Orlando USTA Pro Circuit Event

Final
- Champions: (United States) Hailey Baptiste (United States) Whitney Osuigwe
- Runners-up: (United States) Angela Kulikov (United States) Rianna Valdes
- Score: 7–6^{(9–7)}, 7–5

Events
Singles	Doubles
← 2021 ·	Orlando USTA Pro Circuit Event	· 2022 →

Emina Bektas and Tara Moore were the defending champions but chose not to participate.

Hailey Baptiste and Whitney Osuigwe won the title, defeating Angela Kulikov and Rianna Valdes in the final, 7–6^{(9–7)}, 7–5.

== Seeds ==
1. (United States) Catherine Harrison / (Netherlands) Arianne Hartono (semifinals)
2. (United States) Usue Maitane Arconada / (United States) Christina McHale (quarterfinals)
3. (Switzerland) Conny Perrin / (Mexico) Marcela Zacarías (quarterfinals)
4. (United States) Hailey Baptiste / (United States) Whitney Osuigwe (champions)

== Draw ==
=== Key ===
- Q = Qualifier
- WC = Wild card
- LL = Lucky loser
- Alt = Alternate
- SE = Special exempt
- PR = Protected ranking
- ITF = ITF entry
- JE = Junior exempt
- w/o = Walkover
- r = Retired
- d = Defaulted
- SR = Special ranking

=== Draw ===
First round
1	(United States) C Harrison (Netherlands) A Hartono	7^{7}	6
(United Kingdom) J Burrage (Greece) D Papamichail	6^{1}	4
(United States) S Chang (United States) A Kiick	1	3
WC	(United States) A Rogers (United States) C Rosca	6	6
4	(United States) H Baptiste (United States) W Osuigwe	6	7^{10}
WC	(United States) R Brantmeier (United States) E Kalieva	2	6^{8}
(Ukraine) K Bondarenko (Germany) T Maria	1	6	[10]
(United States) A Krueger (United States) R Montgomery	6	1	[8]
(Chinese Taipei) E-s Liang (China) Y Yuan	6^{9}	3
WC	(United States) J Hart (United States) R McAdoo	7^{11}	6
(Burundi) S Nahimana (France) M Partaud	3	4
3	(Switzerland) C Perrin (Mexico) M Zacarías	6	6
(Chinese Taipei) Y-c Hsieh (Chinese Taipei) C-y Hsu	4	6	[11]
(United States) A Kulikov (United States) R Valdes	6	2	[13]
(Switzerland) L Küng (United States) A Parks	0	2
2	(United States) UM Arconada (United States) C McHale	6	6

Quarterfinals
1	(United States) C Harrison (Netherlands) A Hartono	4	6	[10]
WC	(United States) A Rogers (United States) C Rosca	6	1	[6]
4	(United States) H Baptiste (United States) W Osuigwe	6	6^{6}	[10]
(Ukraine) K Bondarenko (Germany) T Maria	1	7^{8}	[7]
WC	(United States) J Hart (United States) R McAdoo	6	6
3	(Switzerland) C Perrin (Mexico) M Zacarías	4	4
(United States) A Kulikov (United States) R Valdes	6	6
2	(United States) UM Arconada (United States) C McHale	3	3

Semifinals
1	(United States) C Harrison (Netherlands) A Hartono	6^{6}	2
4	(United States) H Baptiste (United States) W Osuigwe	7^{8}	6
WC	(United States) J Hart (United States) R McAdoo	5	6	[4]
(United States) A Kulikov (United States) R Valdes	7	0	[10]

Final
4	(United States) H Baptiste (United States) W Osuigwe	7^{9}	7
(United States) A Kulikov (United States) R Valdes	6^{7}	5
