= 2022 Orlando USTA Pro Circuit Event 2 – Singles =

Singles
- 2022 Orlando USTA Pro Circuit Event 2

Final
- Champion: (United States) Robin Anderson
- Runner-up: (United States) Sachia Vickery
- Score: 7–5, 6–4

Events
Singles	Doubles
← 2022 ·	Orlando USTA Pro Circuit Event	· 2023 →

Zheng Qinwen was the defending champion but chose to participate at the 2022 French Open instead.

Robin Anderson won the title, defeating Sachia Vickery in the final, 7–5, 6–4.

== Seeds ==
1. (United States) Robin Anderson (champion)
2. (United States) Grace Min (second round)
3. (United States) Jamie Loeb (second round)
4. (United States) Francesca Di Lorenzo (second round)
5. (Argentina) María Lourdes Carlé (quarterfinals)
6. (United States) Sachia Vickery (final)
7. (United States) Hanna Chang (first round)
8. (United States) Sophie Chang (semifinals)

== Draw ==
=== Key ===
- Q = Qualifier
- WC = Wild card
- LL = Lucky loser
- Alt = Alternate
- SE = Special exempt
- PR = Protected ranking
- ITF = ITF entry
- JE = Junior exempt
- w/o = Walkover
- r = Retired
- d = Defaulted
- SR = Special ranking

=== Finals ===
Semifinals
1	(United States) Robin Anderson	3	6	6
8	(United States) Sophie Chang	6	4	3
6	(United States) Sachia Vickery	7	6
(United States) Kayla Day	5	2

Final
1	(United States) Robin Anderson	7	6
6	(United States) Sachia Vickery	5	4

=== Top half ===
First round
1	(United States) R Anderson	6	6
Q	(United States) J DeFalco	0	4
(United States) V Duval	6	6
Q	(Japan) H Sakatsume	4	2
(Canada) C Zhao	1	6^{5}
(Mexico) AS Sánchez	6	7^{7}
(United States) D Lao	7^{7}	7^{7}
7	(United States) H Chang	6^{1}	6^{4}
4	(United States) F Di Lorenzo	6	4	6
Q	(United States) C Rosca	3	6	1
Q	(United States) K Shaffer	2	7	5
PR	(United States) M Mateas	6	5	7
Q	(China) Y Ma	3	4
Q	(United States) A Graham	6	6
Q	(United States) A Zhu	3	7^{7}	5
8	(United States) S Chang	6	6^{3}	7

Second round
1	(United States) R Anderson	5	6	3
(United States) V Duval	7	0	0^{r}
(Mexico) AS Sánchez	3	6	4
(United States) D Lao	6	0	6
4	(United States) F Di Lorenzo	6^{4}	5
PR	(United States) M Mateas	7^{7}	7
Q	(United States) A Graham	1	1
8	(United States) S Chang	6	6

Quarterfinals
1	(United States) R Anderson	6	6^{6}	6
(United States) D Lao	3	7^{8}	3
PR	(United States) M Mateas	5	2
8	(United States) S Chang	7	6

Semifinals
1	(United States) R Anderson	3	6	6
8	(United States) S Chang	6	4	3

=== Bottom half ===
First round
6	(United States) S Vickery	6	6
(United States) A Krueger	4	1
Q	(United States) A Lahey	1	1
(United States) K Scott	6	6
(United States) E Kalieva	4	0
(United States) E Douglas	6	6
WC	(United States) E Oosterhout	1	6^{5}
3	(United States) J Loeb	6	7^{7}
5	(Argentina) ML Carlé	2	7	7^{7}
(United States) E Mandlik	6	5	6^{3}
(United States) D Hewitt	3	0^{r}
WC	(United States) G Price	6	1
(Georgia (country)) S Shapatava	4	1
(United States) K Day	6	6
(Canada) K Sebov	0	3
2	(United States) G Min	6	6

Second round
6	(United States) S Vickery	6	6
(United States) K Scott	2	2
(United States) E Douglas	4	7^{7}	6
3	(United States) J Loeb	6	6^{2}	2
5	(Argentina) ML Carlé	6	6
WC	(United States) G Price	2	2
(United States) K Day	6	6
2	(United States) G Min	2	3

Quarterfinals
6	(United States) S Vickery	6	6
(United States) E Douglas	2	1
5	(Argentina) ML Carlé	3	3
(United States) K Day	6	6

Semifinals
6	(United States) S Vickery	7	6
(United States) K Day	5	2
