= 2022 Orlando USTA Pro Circuit Event 2 =

Tennis tournament

- Date: 23–29 May 2022
- Edition: 4th (on hard court)
- Category: ITF Women's World Tennis Tour
- Prize money: $60,000
- Surface: Hard / Outdoor
- Location: Orlando, Florida, United States

Champions

Singles
- (United States) Robin Anderson

Doubles
- (United States) Sophie Chang / (United States) Angela Kulikov
← 2022 ·	Orlando USTA Pro Circuit Event	· 2023 →

The 2022 Orlando USTA Pro Circuit Event 2 was a professional tennis tournament played on outdoor hard courts. It was the fourth edition of the tournament which was part of the 2022 ITF Women's World Tennis Tour. It took place in Orlando, Florida, United States between 23 and 29 May 2022.

== Singles main draw entrants ==
=== Seeds ===
Country	Player	Rank^{1}	Seed
USA	Robin Anderson	166	1
USA	Grace Min	182	2
USA	Jamie Loeb	202	3
USA	Francesca Di Lorenzo	234	4
ARG	María Lourdes Carlé	245	5
USA	Sachia Vickery	262	6
USA	Hanna Chang	269	7
USA	Sophie Chang	281	8

- ^{1} Rankings are as of 16 May 2022.

=== Other entrants ===
The following players received wildcards into the singles main draw:

- (United States) Gabriella Price
- (United States) Erica Oosterhout

The following player received entry using a protected ranking:

- (United States) Maria Mateas

The following players received entry from the qualifying draw:

- (United States) Jenna DeFalco
- (United States) Alexa Graham
- (United States) Ashley Lahey
- (China) Ma Yexin
- (United States) Christina Rosca
- (Japan) Himeno Sakatsume
- (United States) Kennedy Shaffer
- (United States) Amy Zhu

== Champions ==
=== Singles ===
- (United States) Robin Anderson def. (United States) Sachia Vickery, 7–5, 6–4

=== Doubles ===
- (United States) Sophie Chang / (United States) Angela Kulikov def. (United States) Hanna Chang / (United States) Elizabeth Mandlik, 6–3, 2–6, [10–6]
