= 2022 Orlando USTA Pro Circuit Event – Singles =

Singles
- 2022 Orlando USTA Pro Circuit Event

Final
- Champion: (China) Zheng Qinwen
- Runner-up: (United States) Christina McHale
- Score: 6–0, 6–1

Events
Singles	Doubles
← 2021 ·	Orlando USTA Pro Circuit Event	· 2022 →

Katie Swan was the defending champion but chose not to participate.

Zheng Qinwen won the title, defeating Christina McHale in the final, 6–0, 6–1.

== Seeds ==
1. (Japan) Misaki Doi (second round)
2. (China) Zheng Qinwen (champion)
3. (Mexico) Renata Zarazúa (first round)
4. (China) Wang Xiyu (quarterfinals)
5. (China) Yuan Yue (first round)
6. (United States) CoCo Vandeweghe (withdrew)
7. (Switzerland) Leonie Küng (first round)
8. (United States) Hailey Baptiste (quarterfinals)

== Draw ==
=== Key ===
- Q = Qualifier
- WC = Wild card
- LL = Lucky loser
- Alt = Alternate
- SE = Special exempt
- PR = Protected ranking
- ITF = ITF entry
- JE = Junior exempt
- w/o = Walkover
- r = Retired
- d = Defaulted
- SR = Special ranking

=== Finals ===
Semifinals
(United States) Christina McHale	6	6
(Spain) Irene Burillo Escorihuela	4	1
WC	(United States) Elvina Kalieva	0	2
2	(China) Zheng Qinwen	6	6

Final
(United States) Christina McHale	0	1
2	(China) Zheng Qinwen	6	6

=== Top half ===
First round
1	(Japan) M Doi	6	4	6
LL	(United States) D Lao	3	6	2
(United States) C McHale	6	6
Q	(Germany) T Maria	4	4
WC	(United States) S Vickery	6	7^{7}
(Chinese Taipei) E-s Liang	4	6^{5}
WC	(United States) A Krueger	3	2
8	(United States) H Baptiste	6	6
3	(Mexico) R Zarazúa	3	1
(Spain) I Burillo Escorihuela	6	6
(United Kingdom) J Burrage	4	6	6
Q	(Mexico) M Zacarías	6	1	4
(Ukraine) K Bondarenko	6^{2}	1
WC	(United States) W Osuigwe	7^{7}	6
(United States) UM Arconada	6	6
LL	(Chinese Taipei) C-y Hsu	2	2

Second round
1	(Japan) M Doi	2	7	1
(United States) C McHale	6	5	6
WC	(United States) S Vickery	2	6	2
8	(United States) H Baptiste	6	4	6
(Spain) I Burillo Escorihuela	6	6
(United Kingdom) J Burrage	4	2
WC	(United States) W Osuigwe	4	4
(United States) UM Arconada	6	6

Quarterfinals
(United States) C McHale	6	6
8	(United States) H Baptiste	2	1
(Spain) I Burillo Escorihuela	6	6
(United States) UM Arconada	1	4

Semifinals
(United States) C McHale	6	6
(Spain) I Burillo Escorihuela	4	1

=== Bottom half ===
First round
7	(Switzerland) L Küng	1	3
Q	(France) M Partaud	6	6
WC	(United States) E Kalieva	6	6
(United States) A Parks	4	0
(United States) G Min	1	7^{7}	6
(Netherlands) A Hartono	6	6^{2}	3
Q	(United States) R Montgomery	6	3	2
4	(China) Xiy Wang	3	6	6
5	(China) Y Yuan	6	5	5
Q	(Belarus) V Lapko	1	7	7
(United States) F Di Lorenzo	6	6
Q	(Burundi) S Nahimana	2	2
Q	(United States) C Harrison	6^{2}	7^{9}	6
Q	(United States) S Chang	7^{7}	6^{7}	1
(Greece) D Papamichail	4	2
2	(China) Q Zheng	6	6

Second round
Q	(France) M Partaud	2	6^{5}
WC	(United States) E Kalieva	6	7^{7}
(United States) G Min	2	2
4	(China) Xiy Wang	6	6
Q	(Belarus) V Lapko	4	6	6
(United States) F Di Lorenzo	6	2	3
Q	(United States) C Harrison	1	2
2	(China) Q Zheng	6	6

Quarterfinals
WC	(United States) E Kalieva	6	6
4	(China) Xiy Wang	3	4
Q	(Belarus) V Lapko	3	0^{r}
2	(China) Q Zheng	6	3

Semifinals
WC	(United States) E Kalieva	0	2
2	(China) Q Zheng	6	6
