= 2023 Orlando USTA Pro Circuit Event – Doubles =

Doubles
- 2023 Orlando USTA Pro Circuit Event

Final
- Champions: (United States) Ashlyn Krueger (United States) Robin Montgomery
- Runners-up: (Netherlands) Arianne Hartono (Netherlands) Eva Vedder
- Score: 7–5, 6–1

Events
Singles	Doubles
← 2022 ·	Orlando USTA Pro Circuit Event	· 2024 →

Sophie Chang and Angela Kulikov were the defending champions but chose not to participate.

Ashlyn Krueger and Robin Montgomery won the title, defeating Arianne Hartono and Eva Vedder in the final, 7–5, 6–1.

== Seeds ==
1. (United States) Anna Rogers / (Australia) Olivia Tjandramulia (semifinals)
2. (Netherlands) Arianne Hartono / (Netherlands) Eva Vedder (final)
3. (United States) Francesca Di Lorenzo / (Mexico) Marcela Zacarías (quarterfinals)
4. (United States) Ashlyn Krueger / (United States) Robin Montgomery (champions)

== Draw ==
=== Key ===
- Q = Qualifier
- WC = Wild card
- LL = Lucky loser
- Alt = Alternate
- SE = Special exempt
- PR = Protected ranking
- ITF = ITF entry
- JE = Junior exempt
- w/o = Walkover
- r = Retired
- d = Defaulted
- SR = Special ranking

First round
1	(United States) A Rogers (Australia) O Tjandramulia	7	6
(Chinese Taipei) C-y Hsu (United States) A Reami	5	1
(Japan) H Arakawa (Japan) N Arakawa	6	6
WC	(United States) J Daniel (United States) M Jones	3	4
4	(United States) A Krueger (United States) R Montgomery	6	7
WC	(United States) A Zamarripa (United States) M Zamarripa	4	5
(Japan) M Ayukawa (Czech Republic) G Knutson	4	6	[3]
WC	(United States) S Crawford (United States) I Hartman	6	4	[10]
(Australia) K Birrell (Mexico) F Contreras	6	6
(Japan) K Okamura (Brazil) R Pereira	2	2
(Indonesia) B Gumulya (Chinese Taipei) Y-c Hsieh	3	1
3	(United States) F Di Lorenzo (Mexico) M Zacarías	6	6
(Bulgaria) L Karatancheva (United States) C Scholl	1	6	[7]
(France) E Lechemia (France) M Partaud	6	2	[10]
(Argentina) ML Carlé (United States) Q Gleason	4	5
2	(Netherlands) A Hartono (Netherlands) E Vedder	6	7

Quarterfinals
1	(United States) A Rogers (Australia) O Tjandramulia	7^{7}	6
(Japan) H Arakawa (Japan) N Arakawa	6^{3}	2
4	(United States) A Krueger (United States) R Montgomery	6	7^{8}
WC	(United States) S Crawford (United States) I Hartman	1	6^{6}
(Australia) K Birrell (Mexico) F Contreras	7	6
3	(United States) F Di Lorenzo (Mexico) M Zacarías	5	1
(France) E Lechemia (France) M Partaud	2	2
2	(Netherlands) A Hartono (Netherlands) E Vedder	6	6

Semifinals
1	(United States) A Rogers (Australia) O Tjandramulia	3	2
4	(United States) A Krueger (United States) R Montgomery	6	6
(Australia) K Birrell (Mexico) F Contreras	6	4	[8]
2	(Netherlands) A Hartono (Netherlands) E Vedder	4	6	[10]

Final
4	(United States) A Krueger (United States) R Montgomery	7	6
2	(Netherlands) A Hartono (Netherlands) E Vedder	5	1
