= 2011 Aegon International – Women's singles qualifying =

This article displays the qualifying draw of the 2011 Aegon International.

== Players ==
=== Seeds ===
1. (Russia) Elena Vesnina (second round)
2. (Japan) Ayumi Morita (first round)
3. (Spain) Anabel Medina Garrigues (qualifying competition)
4. (Hungary) Gréta Arn (second round, withdrew)
5. (Russia) Vera Dushevina (first round)
6. (Serbia) Bojana Jovanovski (qualified)
7. (India) Sania Mirza (qualifying competition)
8. (France) Alizé Cornet (first round)

=== Qualifiers ===
1. (Croatia) Mirjana Lučić
2. (China) Zheng Jie
3. (Serbia) Bojana Jovanovski
4. (Austria) Tamira Paszek

== Qualifying draw ==
=== First qualifier ===
First round
1	(Russia) Elena Vesnina	6	6
(United States) Jill Craybas	3	4
(Croatia) Mirjana Lučić	6	6
(Kazakhstan) Yaroslava Shvedova	3	4
(United States) Varvara Lepchenko	2	3
(Romania) Sorana Cîrstea	6	6
(United Kingdom) Anne Keothavong	6	6
8	(France) Alizé Cornet	4	2

Second round
1	(Russia) Elena Vesnina	2	2
(Croatia) Mirjana Lučić	6	6
(Romania) Sorana Cîrstea	3	3
(United Kingdom) Anne Keothavong	6	6

Qualifying competition
(Croatia) Mirjana Lučić	7	6
(United Kingdom) Anne Keothavong	5	1

=== Second qualifier ===
First round
2	(Japan) Ayumi Morita	3	1
(China) Zheng Jie	6	6
(Romania) Edina Gallovits-Hall	6	6
(Thailand) Noppawan Lertcheewakarn	4	4
(China) Han Xinyun	2	3
(United States) Melanie Oudin	6	6
(China) Zhang Shuai	7	6
5	(Russia) Vera Dushevina	5	4

Second round
(China) Zheng Jie	2	6	6
(Romania) Edina Gallovits-Hall	6	3	1
(United States) Melanie Oudin	w/o
(China) Zhang Shuai

Qualifying competition
(China) Zheng Jie	6	6
(United States) Melanie Oudin	1	4

=== Third qualifier ===
First round
3	(Spain) Anabel Medina Garrigues	6	6
WC	(United Kingdom) Naomi Broady	4	2
(Czech Republic) Andrea Hlaváčková	2	5
(United States) Christina McHale	6	7
(United States) Alison Riske	6	6
WC	(United Kingdom) Katie O'Brien	2	4
WC	(United Kingdom) Anna Fitzpatrick	6^{4}	2
6	(Serbia) Bojana Jovanovski	7	6

Second round
3	(Spain) Anabel Medina Garrigues	6	6
(United States) Christina McHale	3	2
(United States) Alison Riske	3	3
6	(Serbia) Bojana Jovanovski	6	6

Qualifying competition
3	(Spain) Anabel Medina Garrigues	2	4
6	(Serbia) Bojana Jovanovski	6	6

=== Fourth qualifier ===
First round
4	(Hungary) Gréta Arn	6	6
(Australia) Anastasia Rodionova	1	4
(United States) Vania King	2	4
(Austria) Tamira Paszek	6	6
WC	(United Kingdom) Emily Webley-Smith	2	4
(Georgia (country)) Anna Tatishvili	6	6
(Czech Republic) Renata Voráčová	6	3	4
7	(India) Sania Mirza	4	6	6

Second round
4	(Hungary) Gréta Arn
(Austria) Tamira Paszek	w/o
(Georgia (country)) Anna Tatishvili	2	6	3
7	(India) Sania Mirza	6	3	6

Qualifying competition
(Austria) Tamira Paszek	6	6
7	(India) Sania Mirza	3	3
