= 2011 Monterrey Open – Singles qualifying =

This article displays the qualifying draw of the 2011 Monterrey Open.

== Players ==
=== Seeds ===
1. (United States) Varvara Lepchenko (second round)
2. (Czech Republic) Lucie Hradecká (qualified)
3. (Spain) Laura Pous Tió (qualified)
4. (France) Virginie Razzano (second round)
5. (Austria) Patricia Mayr-Achleitner (first round)
6. (United States) Christina McHale (second round)
7. (Netherlands) Arantxa Rus (withdrew due to an illness)
8. (United States) Alison Riske (qualifying competition)

=== Qualifiers ===
1. (Canada) Aleksandra Wozniak
2. (Czech Republic) Lucie Hradecká
3. (Spain) Laura Pous Tió
4. (Greece) Eleni Daniilidou

== Qualifying draw ==
=== First qualifier ===
First round
1	(United States) Varvara Lepchenko	6	6
WC	(Mexico) Camila Fuentes	3	0
(Canada) Aleksandra Wozniak	6	7
WC	(Hungary) Tímea Babos	4	5
(France) Laura Thorpe	5	6	7
(Russia) Arina Rodionova	7	1	5
(Belarus) Anastasiya Yakimova	1	7	6
5	(Austria) Patricia Mayr-Achleitner	6	6^{5}	2

Second round
1	(United States) Varvara Lepchenko	1	5
(Canada) Aleksandra Wozniak	6	7
(France) Laura Thorpe	3	5
(Belarus) Anastasiya Yakimova	6	7

Qualifying competition
(Canada) Aleksandra Wozniak	6	7
(Belarus) Anastasiya Yakimova	4	6^{6}

=== Second qualifier ===
First round
2	(Czech Republic) Lucie Hradecká	6	3	6
(Russia) Anastasia Pivovarova	4	6	1
Alt	(Colombia) Catalina Castaño	6	6^{5}	0
(United Kingdom) Heather Watson	2	7	6
(Slovenia) Maša Zec Peškirič	6^{5}	3
(United States) Jamie Hampton	7	6
(Czech Republic) Eva Birnerová	4	4
6	(United States) Christina McHale	6	6

Second round
2	(Czech Republic) Lucie Hradecká	5	6	6
(United Kingdom) Heather Watson	7	2	2
(United States) Jamie Hampton	6	7
6	(United States) Christina McHale	3	6^{4}

Qualifying competition
2	(Czech Republic) Lucie Hradecká	6	6
(United States) Jamie Hampton	3	1

=== Third qualifier ===
First round
3	(Spain) Laura Pous Tió	6	6
WC	(Mexico) Carolina Betancourt	4	0
(Germany) Anna-Lena Grönefeld	4	5
(Italy) Corinna Dentoni	6	7
(Kazakhstan) Sesil Karatantcheva	4	6	6
(Ukraine) Lesia Tsurenko	6	2	4
(Colombia) Mariana Duque Mariño	1	6	6
Alt	(United States) Ahsha Rolle	6	3	2

Second round
3	(Spain) Laura Pous Tió	6	7
(Italy) Corinna Dentoni	3	6^{3}
(Kazakhstan) Sesil Karatantcheva	6	7
(Colombia) Mariana Duque Mariño	2	5

Qualifying competition
3	(Spain) Laura Pous Tió	6	6
(Kazakhstan) Sesil Karatantcheva	1	3

=== Fourth qualifier ===
First round
4	(France) Virginie Razzano	6	6
WC	(Mexico) Ivette López	1	1
(Greece) Eleni Daniilidou	6	6
(Argentina) María Irigoyen	2	0
(Spain) Silvia Soler Espinosa	6	6
(Ukraine) Olga Savchuk	1	3
(Australia) Sally Peers	2	3
8	(United States) Alison Riske	6	6

Second round
4	(France) Virginie Razzano	6	4	5
(Greece) Eleni Daniilidou	3	6	7
(Spain) Silvia Soler Espinosa	0	5
8	(United States) Alison Riske	6	7

Qualifying competition
(Greece) Eleni Daniilidou	6	6
8	(United States) Alison Riske	3	4
