= 2022 Orlando USTA Pro Circuit Event 2 – Doubles =

Doubles
- 2022 Orlando USTA Pro Circuit Event 2

Final
- Champions: (United States) Sophie Chang (United States) Angela Kulikov
- Runners-up: (United States) Hanna Chang (United States) Elizabeth Mandlik
- Score: 6–3, 2–6, [10–6]

Events
Singles	Doubles
← 2022 ·	Orlando USTA Pro Circuit Event	· 2023 →

Hailey Baptiste and Whitney Osuigwe were the defending champions but chose not to participate.

Sophie Chang and Angela Kulikov won the title, defeating Hanna Chang and Elizabeth Mandlik in the final, 6–3, 2–6, [10–6].

== Seeds ==
1. (United States) Sophie Chang / (United States) Angela Kulikov (champions)
2. (United States) Robin Anderson / (Argentina) María Lourdes Carlé (quarterfinals)
3. (United States) Anna Rogers / (United States) Christina Rosca (semifinals)
4. (United States) Jamie Loeb / (Mexico) Ana Sofía Sánchez (semifinals)

== Draw ==
=== Key ===
- Q = Qualifier
- WC = Wild card
- LL = Lucky loser
- Alt = Alternate
- SE = Special exempt
- PR = Protected ranking
- ITF = ITF entry
- JE = Junior exempt
- w/o = Walkover
- r = Retired
- d = Defaulted
- SR = Special ranking

=== Draw ===
First round
(Canada) K Sebov (United States) A Zhu	2	2
(United States) D Hewitt (United States) R McAdoo	6	6
3	(United States) A Rogers (United States) C Rosca	6	3	[12]
(Japan) H Kuwata (China) Y Ma	4	6	[10]
(United States) J DeFalco (Germany) J Jebawy	6	4	[9]
(United States) V Emma (United States) A Reami	3	6	[11]
(United States) A Nefedova; A Sysoeva	1	2
(France) T Fiquet (Lithuania) A Paražinskaitė	6	6
(United States) E Oosterhout (Japan) H Sakatsume	3	3
4	(United States) J Loeb (Mexico) AS Sánchez	6	6
(United States) H Chang (United States) E Mandlik	6	6
(Bulgaria) E Tchakarova (Bulgaria) V Tchakarova	4	1
WC	(Italy) G Arangio (United States) S Schenck	0	0
2	(United States) R Anderson (Argentina) ML Carlé	6	6

Quarterfinals
1	(United States) S Chang (United States) A Kulikov	w/o
(United States) D Hewitt (United States) R McAdoo
3	(United States) A Rogers (United States) C Rosca	3	6	[10]
(United States) V Emma (United States) A Reami	6	2	[5]
(France) T Fiquet (Lithuania) A Paražinskaitė	4	5
4	(United States) J Loeb (Mexico) AS Sánchez	6	7
(United States) H Chang (United States) E Mandlik	6	6
2	(United States) R Anderson (Argentina) ML Carlé	4	2

Semifinals
1	(United States) S Chang (United States) A Kulikov	6	3	[10]
3	(United States) A Rogers (United States) C Rosca	3	6	[6]
4	(United States) J Loeb (Mexico) AS Sánchez	2	6	[4]
(United States) H Chang (United States) E Mandlik	6	4	[10]

Final
1	(United States) S Chang (United States) A Kulikov	6	2	[10]
(United States) H Chang (United States) E Mandlik	3	6	[6]
