= 2023 Orlando USTA Pro Circuit Event – Singles =

Singles
- 2023 Orlando USTA Pro Circuit Event

Final
- Champion: (Australia) Kimberly Birrell
- Runner-up: (Sweden) Rebecca Peterson
- Score: 6–3, 6–0

Events
Singles	Doubles
← 2022 ·	Orlando USTA Pro Circuit Event	· 2024 →

Robin Anderson was the defending champion but chose not to participate.

Kimberly Birrell won the title, defeating Rebecca Peterson in the final, 6–3, 6–0.

== Seeds ==
1. (Hungary) Panna Udvardy (second round)
2. (United States) Elizabeth Mandlik (second round)
3. (Sweden) Rebecca Peterson (final)
4. (Argentina) María Lourdes Carlé (second round)
5. (Australia) Kimberly Birrell (champion)
6. (United States) Ann Li (second round)
7. (United States) Caroline Dolehide (quarterfinals)
8. (United States) Ashlyn Krueger (semifinals)

== Draw ==
=== Key ===
- Q = Qualifier
- WC = Wild card
- LL = Lucky loser
- Alt = Alternate
- SE = Special exempt
- PR = Protected ranking
- ITF = ITF entry
- JE = Junior exempt
- w/o = Walkover
- r = Retired
- d = Defaulted
- SR = Special ranking

=== Finals ===
Semifinals
Q	(Germany) Sabine Lisicki	7^{7}	6^{9}	2
3	(Sweden) Rebecca Peterson	6^{5}	7^{11}	6
8	(United States) Ashlyn Krueger	6	4	2
5	(Australia) Kimberly Birrell	3	6	6

Final
3	(Sweden) Rebecca Peterson	3	0
5	(Australia) Kimberly Birrell	6	6

=== Top half ===
First round
1	(Hungary) P Udvardy	6	6
(United States) E Kalieva	0	2
(Netherlands) A Hartono	6	6^{4}	6
Q	(United States) S Crawford	1	7^{7}	2
Q	(Germany) S Lisicki	6	3	6
(Netherlands) E Vedder	1	6	4
SR	(United States) I Hartman	3	1
6	(United States) A Li	6	6
3	(Sweden) R Peterson	6	5	6
Q	(Switzerland) L Sun	1	7	2
Q	(Mexico) R Zarazúa	2	4
Q	(United States) L Hovde	6	6
(Croatia) P Marčinko	6	6^{2}	6
Q	(Malta) F Curmi	2	7^{7}	2
(United States) S Chang	6^{4}	0
7	(United States) C Dolehide	7^{7}	6

Second round
1	(Hungary) P Udvardy	3	4
(Netherlands) A Hartono	6	6
Q	(Germany) S Lisicki	7^{7}	6
6	(United States) A Li	6^{4}	3
3	(Sweden) R Peterson	6	7
Q	(United States) L Hovde	2	5
(Croatia) P Marčinko	3	2
7	(United States) C Dolehide	6	6

Quarterfinals
(Netherlands) A Hartono	6^{0}	2
Q	(Germany) S Lisicki	7^{7}	6
3	(Sweden) R Peterson	6	6
7	(United States) C Dolehide	4	4

Semifinals
Q	(Germany) S Lisicki	7^{7}	6^{9}	2
3	(Sweden) R Peterson	6^{5}	7^{11}	6

=== Bottom half ===
First round
8	(United States) A Krueger	5	6	6
Q	(United States) A Rogers	7	3	3
(United States) H Baptiste	6	7^{9}
Q	(Japan) H Arakawa	4	6^{7}
WC	(United States) F Di Lorenzo	6	6
WC	(United States) J DeFalco	1	4
WC	(United States) Q Gleason	1	1
4	(Argentina) ML Carlé	6	6
5	(Australia) K Birrell	6	6
(Mexico) F Contreras	2	2
(Mexico) M Zacarías	7^{7}	6
WC	(United States) H Inoue	6^{4}	1
(United States) S Vickery	6	6
SE	(Czech Republic) G Knutson	1	0
(United States) R Montgomery	5	6	4
2	(United States) E Mandlik	7	4	6

Second round
8	(United States) A Krueger	6	6
(United States) H Baptiste	3	1
WC	(United States) F Di Lorenzo	6	6
4	(Argentina) ML Carlé	4	3
5	(Australia) K Birrell	6	6
(Mexico) M Zacarías	1	4
(United States) S Vickery	6	6
2	(United States) E Mandlik	1	4

Quarterfinals
8	(United States) A Krueger	3	6	6
WC	(United States) F Di Lorenzo	6	3	2
5	(Australia) K Birrell	5	6	6
(United States) S Vickery	7	1	2

Semifinals
8	(United States) A Krueger	6	4	2
5	(Australia) K Birrell	3	6	6
