= Orlando USTA Pro Circuit Event =

- 2022 Orlando USTA Pro Circuit Event 2

Women's World Tennis Tour
- Event name: Orlando USTA Pro Circuit Event
- Location: Orlando, Florida, United States
- Venue: USTA National Campus
- Category: ITF Women's World Tennis Tour
- Surface: Hard / Outdoor; Clay / Outdoor
- Draw: 32S/32Q/16D
- Prize money: $60,000 / $25,000

The Orlando USTA Pro Circuit Events are a series of tournaments for professional female tennis players played on outdoor hardcourts and outdoor clay courts.

The events are classified as $60,000 and $25,000 ITF Women's World Tennis Tour tournaments and have been held in Orlando, Florida since 2013.

== Past finals ==
=== Singles ===
Year	Surface	Champion	Runner-up	Score
2026 (1)	Clay	(United States) Kayla Day	(United States) Katrina Scott	6–4, 6–2
2025 (4)	Clay	(Hungary) Luca Udvardy	(Greece) Martha Matoula	6–3, 6–3
2025 (3)	Clay	(Netherlands) Eva Vedder	(Slovakia) Viktória Hrunčáková	6–3, 7–6^{(8–6)}
2025 (2)	Clay	(Switzerland) Jenny Dürst	(United States) Bella Payne	6–4, 6–4
2025 (1)	Clay	(Japan) Mayu Crossley	(Italy) Francesca Pace	6–1, 2–6, 6–4
2024	Not held			
2023 (3)	Clay	(Hungary) Fanny Stollár	(United States) Dalayna Hewitt	7–6^{(7–4)}, 6–2
2023 (2)	Hard	(Australia) Kimberly Birrell	(Sweden) Rebecca Peterson	6–3, 6–0
2023 (1)	Hard	(United States) Peyton Stearns	(United States) Robin Montgomery	6–2, 6–0
2022 (3)	Hard	(United States) Robin Anderson	(United States) Sachia Vickery	7–5, 6–4
2022 (2)	Clay	(Sweden) Mirjam Björklund	(Romania) Alexandra Cadanțu-Ignatik	6–3, 6–4
2022 (1)	Hard	(China) Zheng Qinwen	(United States) Christina McHale	6–0, 6–1
2021 (2)	Clay	(United States) Emma Navarro	(United States) Allie Kiick	3–6, 6–2, 6–3
2021 (1)	Hard	(United Kingdom) Katie Swan	(United States) Robin Anderson	6–1, 6–3
2020	Hard	(United States) Alycia Parks	(United States) Robin Montgomery	3–6, 6–4, 6–2
2019 (2)	Clay	(Netherlands) Arantxa Rus	(Romania) Irina Fetecău	6–3, 6–2
2019 (1)	Clay	(United States) Natasha Subhash	(United States) Tori Kinard	6–1, 6–2
2018 (2)	Clay	(United States) Sophie Chang	(Australia) Astra Sharma	6–3, 7–6^{(8–6)}
2018 (1)	Clay	(Ukraine) Anhelina Kalinina	(Austria) Julia Grabher	6–2, 3–6, 7–5
2017 (2)	Clay	(Czech Republic) Marie Bouzková	(Mexico) Victoria Rodríguez	7–5, 5–7, 6–0
2017 (1)	Clay	(Poland) Katarzyna Piter	(United States) Sofia Kenin	6–7^{(4–7)}, 6–2, 6–4
2016	Clay	(United States) Katerina Stewart	(United States) Grace Min	6–4, 6–3
2015	Clay	(United States) Claire Liu	(Hungary) Fanny Stollár	6–1, 6–3
2014	Clay	(United States) Katerina Stewart	(Ukraine) Elizaveta Ianchuk	6–1, 6–1
2013	Clay	(Slovenia) Maša Zec Peškirič	(Belgium) Michaela Boev	0–6, 6–4, 6–1

=== Doubles ===
Year	Surface	Champions	Runners-up	Score
2026 (1)	Clay	(Bulgaria) Lia Karatancheva (Ukraine) Anita Sahdiieva	(Brazil) Thaísa Grana Pedretti (Bolivia) Noelia Zeballos	6–3, 6–4
2025 (4)	Clay	(Kenya) Angella Okutoyi (Italy) Francesca Pace	(United States) Allura Zamarripa (United States) Maribella Zamarripa	3–6, 6–4, [14–12]
2025 (3)	Clay	(United States) Samantha Alicea (United States) Malkia Ngounoue	(United States) Thea Frodin (United States) Welles Newman	6–1, 6–7^{(5–7)}, [11–9]
2025 (2)	Clay	(United States) Allura Zamarripa (United States) Maribella Zamarripa	(Switzerland) Jenny Dürst (Canada) Dasha Plekhanova	6–3, 6–1
2025 (1)	Clay	(United States) Samantha Alicea (United States) Jamilah Snells	(United States) Capucine Jauffret (United States) Ava Rodriguez	6–3, 7–5
2024	Not held			
2023 (3)	Clay	(United States) Makenna Jones (United States) Maria Mateas	(United States) Dalayna Hewitt (Serbia) Katarina Jokić	6–4, 6–2
2023 (2)	Hard	(United States) Ashlyn Krueger (United States) Robin Montgomery	(Netherlands) Arianne Hartono (Netherlands) Eva Vedder	7–5, 6–1
2023 (1)	Hard	(United States) Jada Hart (United States) Rasheeda McAdoo	(Japan) Haruna Arakawa (Japan) Natsuho Arakawa	6–3, 6–3
2022 (3)	Hard	(United States) Sophie Chang (United States) Angela Kulikov	(United States) Hanna Chang (United States) Elizabeth Mandlik	6–3, 2–6, [10–6]
2022 (2)	Clay	(United States) Catherine Harrison (United States) Maegan Manasse	(Chinese Taipei) Hsieh Yu-chieh (Chinese Taipei) Hsu Chieh-yu	6–1, 6–0
2022 (1)	Hard	(United States) Hailey Baptiste (United States) Whitney Osuigwe	(United States) Angela Kulikov (United States) Rianna Valdes	7–6^{(9–7)}, 7–5
2021 (2)	Clay	(United States) Anna Rogers (United States) Christina Rosca	(France) Marine Partaud (Mexico) María Portillo Ramírez	6–3, 6–1
2021 (1)	Hard	(United States) Emina Bektas (United Kingdom) Tara Moore	(Colombia) Camila Osorio (Switzerland) Conny Perrin	7–5, 2–6, [10–5]
2020	Hard	(United States) Rasheeda McAdoo (United States) Alycia Parks	(United States) Jamie Loeb (New Zealand) Erin Routliffe	4–6, 6–1, [11–9]
2019 (2)	Clay	(United States) Katharine Fahey (Germany) Stephanie Wagner	(Brazil) Carolina Alves (Mexico) Renata Zarazúa	4–6, 6–2, [10–7]
2019 (1)	Clay	(United States) Allura Zamarripa (United States) Maribella Zamarripa	(United States) Kimmi Hance (United States) Ashlyn Krueger	6–3, 6–1
2018 (2)	Clay	(United States) Caty McNally (United States) Whitney Osuigwe	(Bulgaria) Dia Evtimova (Belarus) Ilona Kremen	6–2, 6–3
2018 (1)	Clay	(China) Guo Hanyu (Chinese Taipei) Hsu Ching-wen	(Norway) Ulrikke Eikeri (Belarus) Ilona Kremen	6–3, 3–6, [12–10]
2017 (2)	Clay	(United States) Emina Bektas (United States) Sanaz Marand	(United States) Chiara Scholl (Mexico) Marcela Zacarías	6–1, 6–3
2017 (1)	Clay	(United States) Sophie Chang (United States) Madeleine Kobelt	(Poland) Paula Kania (Poland) Katarzyna Piter	6–3, 3–6, [10–6]
2016	Clay	(Norway) Ulrikke Eikeri (Netherlands) Quirine Lemoine	(Bosnia and Herzegovina) Ema Burgić Bucko (Bulgaria) Dia Evtimova	6–1, 6–3
2015	Clay	(United States) Ingrid Neel (Hungary) Fanny Stollár	(Czech Republic) Kateřina Kramperová (United States) Katerina Stewart	6–3, 7–6^{(7–4)}
2014	Clay	(United States) Catherine Bellis (United States) Alexis Nelson	(Australia) Sally Peers (United States) Natalie Pluskota	6–2, 0–6, [11–9]
2013	Clay	(Czech Republic) Nikola Fraňková (Brazil) Nathália Rossi	(Ukraine) Tetyana Arefyeva (Czech Republic) Kateřina Kramperová	7–5, 2–6, [10–8]
