= Christina McHale =

American tennis player

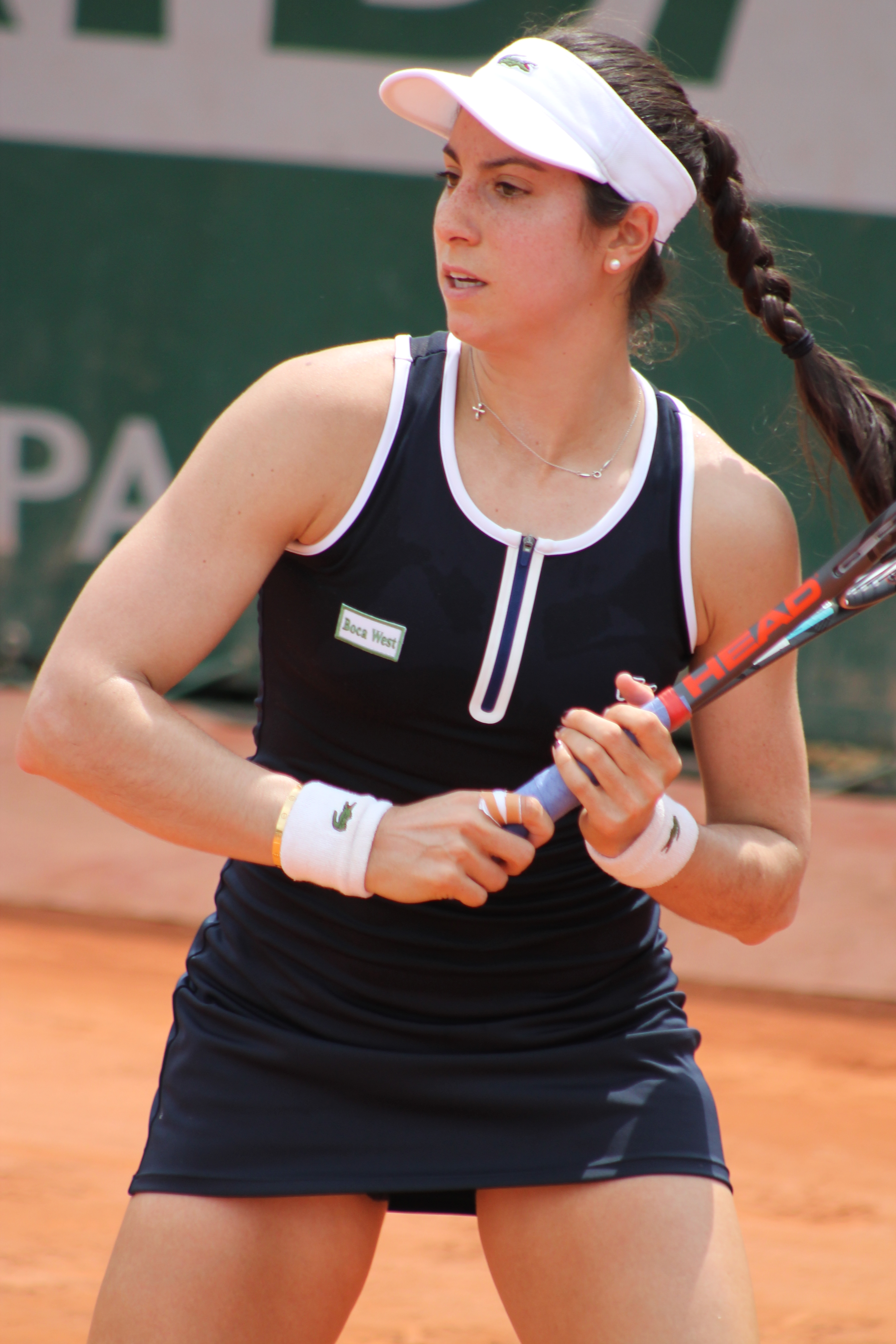
- McHale at the 2016 French Open
- Country (sports): United States
- Residence: Fort Lee, New Jersey
- Born: May 11, 1992 (age 34) Teaneck, New Jersey
- Height: 1.70 m (5 ft 7 in)
- Turned pro: April 2010
- Retired: August 2022
- Plays: Right (two-handed backhand)
- Coach: Jorge Todero
- Prize money: US$ 5,058,331

Singles
- Career record: 394–356
- Career titles: 1
- Highest ranking: No. 24 (August 20, 2012)

Grand Slam singles results
- Australian Open: 3R (2012)
- French Open: 3R (2012)
- Wimbledon: 3R (2012)
- US Open: 3R (2011, 2013)

Other tournaments
- Olympic Games: 1R (2012)

Doubles
- Career record: 116–140
- Career titles: 2
- Highest ranking: No. 35 (January 9, 2017)

Grand Slam doubles results
- Australian Open: 2R (2021)
- French Open: 2R (2012, 2016)
- Wimbledon: 3R (2011, 2016, 2018)
- US Open: 3R (2018)

Grand Slam mixed doubles results
- US Open: SF (2018)

Team competitions
- Fed Cup: 5–5
Medal record
Pan American Games
Silver medal – second place	2011 Guadalajara	Doubles
Bronze medal – third place	2011 Guadalajara	Singles

Christina Maria McHale (born May 11, 1992) is an inactive American tennis player. Her career-high WTA rankings are No. 24 in singles and No. 35 in doubles.

Known for an aggressive baseline game, McHale was recognized by The New York Times for her "booming" groundstrokes and fast footwork. She reached the third round of all four Grand Slam tournaments and represented the United States in Fed Cup and Olympic competitions. In September 2016, McHale won her first and only career WTA Tour singles title at the Japan Women's Open.

== Early life ==
McHale is the daughter of John and Margarita McHale. Her father John is an Irish American, while her mother Margarita was born in Cuba. She resided New Jersey until she was three years old. Her family lived in Hong Kong from the time she was three until she was eight, and she speaks a degree of Mandarin Chinese, along with fluent Spanish. In 2000, the McHale family returned to the United States. In June 2006, she graduated from Upper School of the Englewood Cliffs Public Schools as the eighth-grade valedictorian.

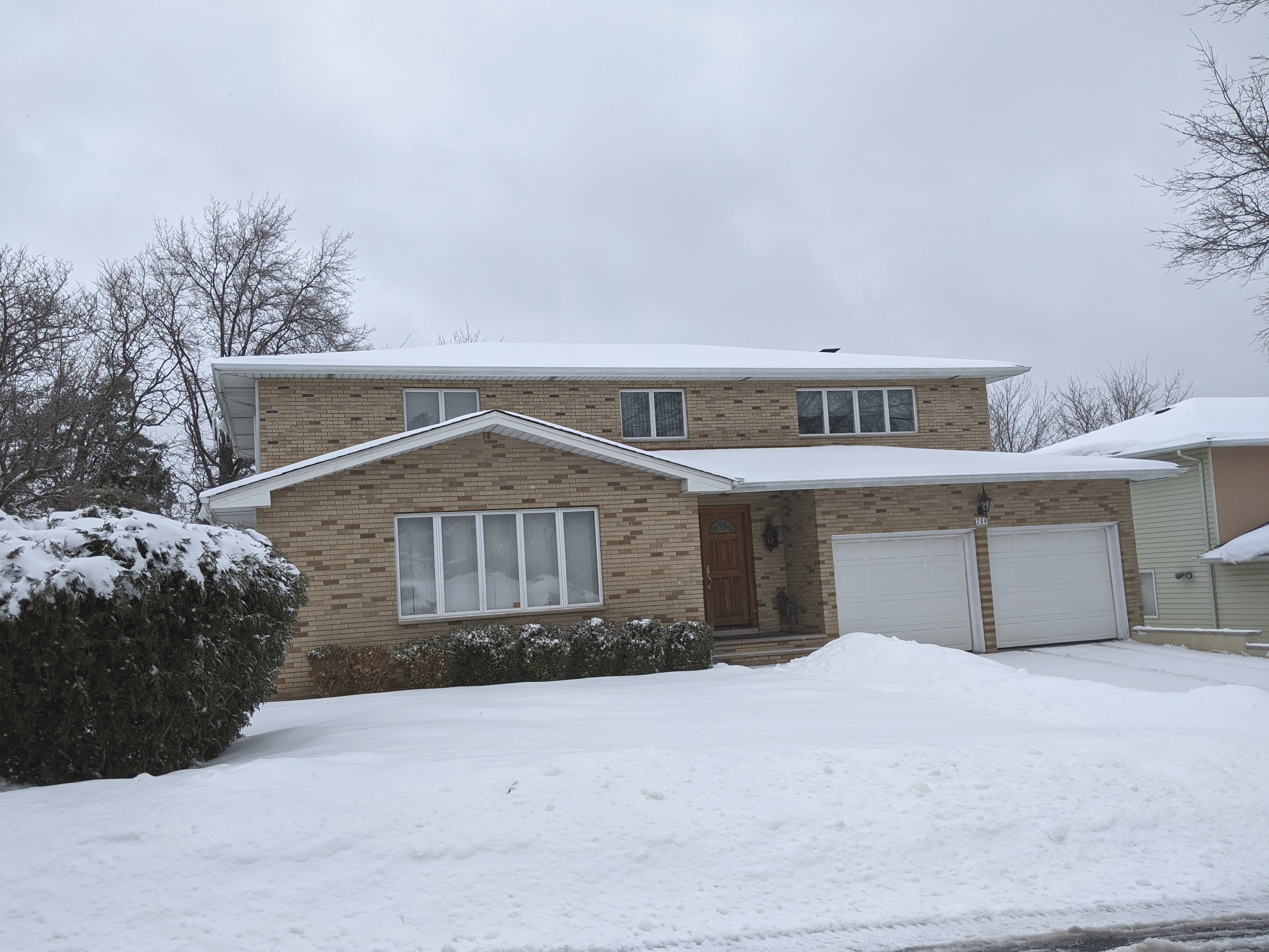
The childhood home where McHale grew up in Englewood Cliffs, New Jersey

For her freshman year of high school, she attended the Academy of Law and Public Safety within Dwight Morrow High School. At the age of 15, she left home to train at the USTA Training Center headquarters in Boca Raton, Florida, and since then she was homeschooled through Kaplan Online High School. Her sister Lauren played collegiate tennis at UNC-Chapel Hill.

== Career ==
McHale began professional training at the USTA Training Center in Carson, California.

=== 2009 ===
She was granted a wildcard into the main draw of the Australian Open where she lost a three-set match in the first round to Jessica Moore.

In March, McHale played at a 25k tournament in Redding, California, where she was defeated in the first round by seventh seed Kimiko Date-Krumm. Playing at the Miami Open, McHale lost in the first round of qualifying to Anastasiya Yakimova.

Competing at a 25k tournament in Szczecin, Poland, McHale advanced to the semifinal round where she was defeated by Stephanie Gehrlein. Seeded fourth at a 10k tournament in Alkmaar, she lost in her quarterfinal match to qualifier Laura Pous Tió. Coming through qualifying at the Vancouver Open, McHale was defeated in the first round by Olga Puchkova. Playing at the Connecticut Open, she lost in the first round of qualifying to Yanina Wickmayer. Entering as a wildcard at the US Open, McHale won her first match in a major by beating Polona Hercog in the first round. She was defeated in the second round by 29th seed, former world No. 1 and 2006 champion, Maria Sharapova.

In Canada at the Challenger de Saguenay, McHale lost in the second round to Anastasia Pivovarova. At the USTA Tennis Classic of Troy in Alabama, McHale reached the final where she was defeated by qualifier and compatriot, Alison Riske. Playing in Kansas City at the Pro Tennis Classic, she lost in the second round to second seed and compatriot, Varvara Lepchenko. At the Goldwater Classic in Phoenix, McHale lost in the first round again to Alison Riske. At her final tournament of the season, the Tevlin Challenger in Toronto, she lost in the second round to Alexandra Stevenson.

McHale ended the year ranked world No. 218.

=== 2010 ===
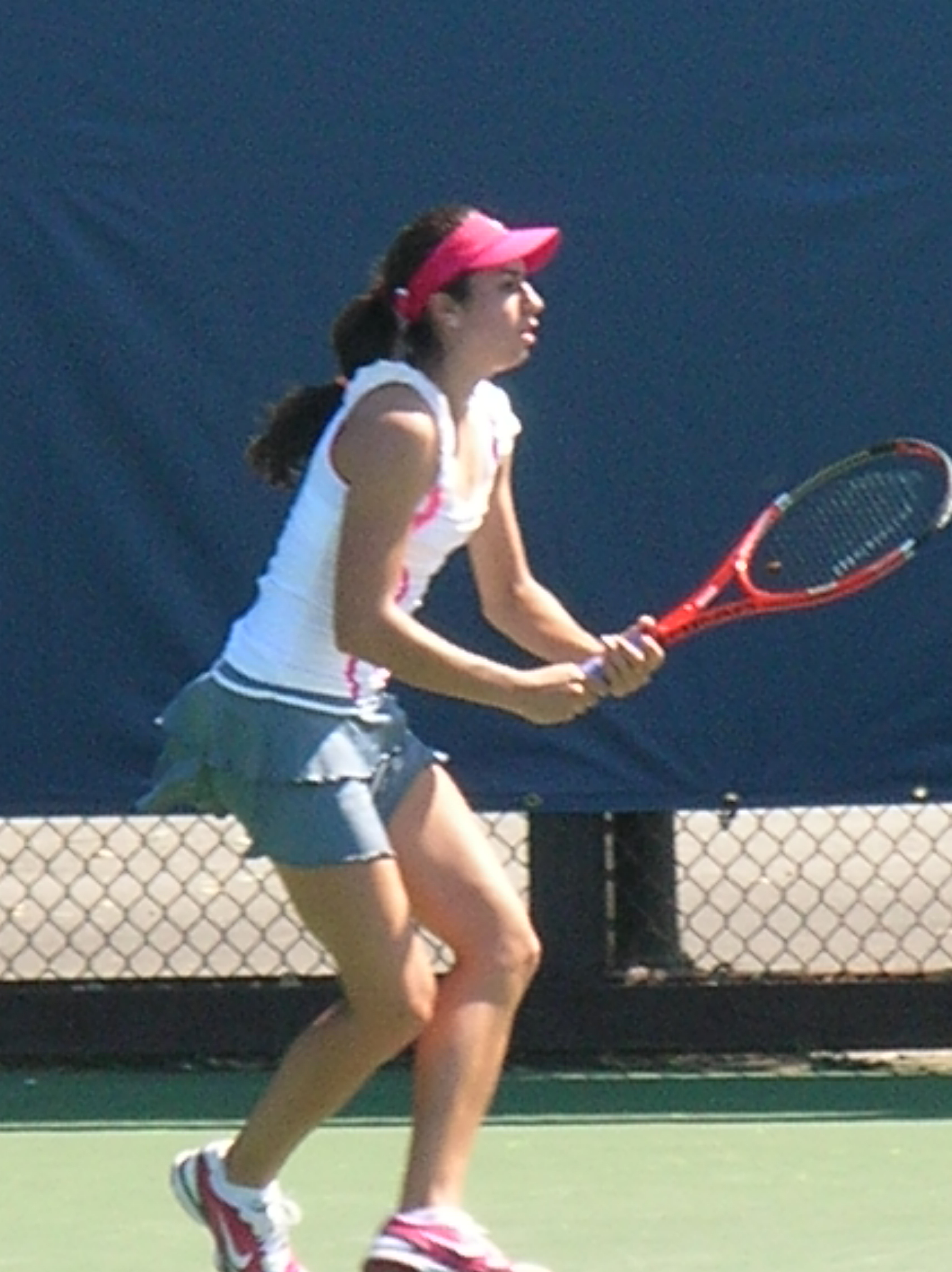
McHale during qualifying at the 2010 Stanford Classic

She started season by playing at a 25k tournament in Plantation, Florida. Seeded seventh, she lost her quarterfinal match to top seed Maret Ani. At the 25k tournament in Lutz, Florida, McHale reached the quarterfinal round where she was defeated by qualifier Florencia Molinero.

Representing the United States in the Fed Cup tie versus France, McHale only played one rubber; she lost to Pauline Parmentier. The U.S. team ended up winning the tie over France 4–1. Playing a 25k tournament in Surprise, Arizona, McHale made it to the semifinals where she was defeated by Abigail Spears. As a wildcard at the Indian Wells Open, McHale lost in the first round to compatriot Vania King. In Miami, she was defeated in the first round of qualifying by Katie O'Brien.

Coming through qualifying at the Family Circle Cup, McHale lost in the third round to 13th seed and compatriot Melanie Oudin. At the French Open, she was defeated in the first round by Varvara Lepchenko.

Playing in Rome at the Italian Open, McHale reached the quarterfinals where she lost to second seed Maria Elena Camerin. Seeded seventh at the Smart Card Open, McHale lost in her quarterfinal match to second seed and eventual champion Patricia Mayr-Achleitner. Seeded fourth at the Grapevine Classic, McHale was eliminated in the first round by Julia Glushko.

Getting past the qualifying rounds at the Stanford Classic, she lost in the second round to top seed Sam Stosur. Competing at the Vancouver Open, McHale advanced to the semifinals where she was defeated by sixth seed Virginie Razzano. Receiving a wildcard to play at the Western & Southern Open, McHale won her first-round match when her opponent, 15th seed Nadia Petrova, retired due to heat illness. McHale lost in the third round to fourth seed and eventual champion Kim Clijsters. In New Haven, she was defeated in the first round of qualifying by Simona Halep. At the US Open, McHale lost in the first round to Vania King.

At the Challenge Bell in Quebec City, McHale reached the semifinals where she was defeated by qualifier and eventual champion Tamira Paszek. Getting through qualifying at the Pan Pacific Open, she lost in the first round to Flavia Pennetta. Seeded sixth at the 100k tournament in Tokyo, McHale was defeated in the first round by Laura Robson. Entering the Japan Women's Open as a qualifier, she lost her first-round match to seventh seed Iveta Benešová. Seeded second at the 50k tournament in Toronto, she was defeated in the first round by Gabriela Dabrowski. Seeded eighth at the 75k tournament in Phoenix, McHale lost in the quarterfinal round to Irina Falconi.

She ended the year ranked world No. 115.

=== 2011 ===
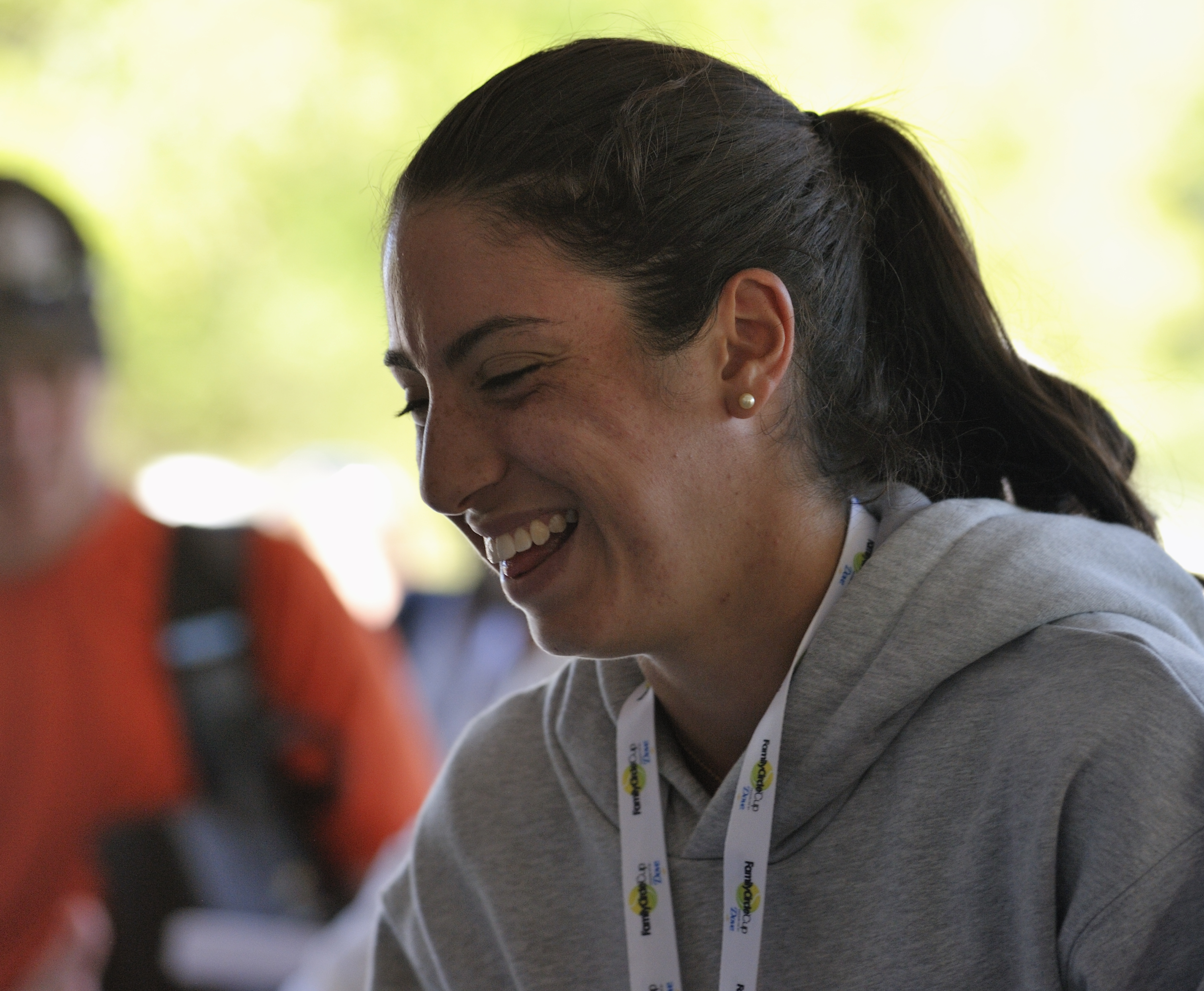
McHale in 2011

McHale began the season at the Brisbane International. After losing in the final round of qualifying to Lucie Hradecká, she entered the main draw as a lucky loser and was defeated in the first round by Roberta Vinci. In Sydney, McHale lost in the first round of qualifying to Karolina Šprem. At the Australian Open, she was defeated in the first round by Carla Suárez Navarro.

At the Midland Tennis Classic, McHale lost in the first round to Anastasia Pivovarova. Playing in Memphis at the Cellular South Cup, she was defeated in the first round by seventh seed Renata Voráčová. In Mexico at the Monterrey Open, McHale lost in the second round of qualifying to Jamie Hampton. Playing at the Indian Wells Open, McHale upset 11th seed Svetlana Kuznetsova in the second round, before being defeated in the third by Nadia Petrova. At the Miami Open, McHale lost in the final round of qualifying to Jelena Dokic. Seeded fourth at the 25k tournament in Pelham, Alabama, McHale reached the quarterfinal, in which she was defeated by Caroline Garcia.

McHale started her preparation for the French Open at the Charleston Open. She advanced to the quarterfinals with victories over qualifier Heather Watson, eighth seed Alisa Kleybanova, and tenth seed Daniela Hantuchová. She lost in her quarterfinal match to third seed and 2007 champion Jelena Janković. During the Fed Cup tie against Germany, McHale lost both of her rubbers to Andrea Petkovic and Sabine Lisicki. Germany ended up winning the tie over the USA 5–0. Getting past qualifying at the Italian Open, McHale was defeated in the second round by second seed Francesca Schiavone. At the Internationaux de Strasbourg, McHale lost in the final round of qualifying to Ahsha Rolle; however, she still entered the main draw as a lucky loser, and was defeated in the first round by qualifier Mirjana Lučić. At the French Open, she lost in a first-round thriller to Sara Errani.

Coming through qualifying at the Internazionale di Roma, McHale won the tournament beating Ekaterina Ivanova in the final.

At her first event of the grass-court season, the Birmingham Classic, she was defeated in the second round by seventh seed Sara Errani. In Eastbourne at the Eastbourne International, McHale fell in the second round of qualifying to Anabel Medina Garrigues. At the Wimbledon Championships, she won her second Grand Slam match by defeating 28th seed Ekaterina Makarova in the first round. She lost in the second round to Tamira Paszek.

Starting her preparation for the US Open at the Stanford Classic, McHale was defeated in the second round by eighth seed Dominika Cibulková. At the San Diego Open, she reached the quarterfinals where she lost to third seed and eventual champion Agnieszka Radwańska. Playing in Cincinnati at the Western & Southern Open, McHale stunned top seed Caroline Wozniacki in her second-round match. She was defeated in the third round by Nadia Petrova. At the New Haven Open at Yale, McHale upset sixth seed Svetlana Kuznetsova in the first round. She then lost in her quarterfinal match to top seed and three-time champion Caroline Wozniacki. Competing in New York at the US Open, McHale beat eighth seed Marion Bartoli in the second round. She was defeated in the third round by 25th seed Maria Kirilenko.

In Tokyo at the Pan Pacific Open, McHale lost in the second round to tenth seed Peng Shuai. Sliding past qualifying at the China Open, she was defeated in the second round by eighth seed Marion Bartoli. McHale competed in her final tournament of the season at the Japan Women's Open. Seeded eighth, she lost in the first round to defending champion Tamarine Tanasugarn.

McHale ended the year ranked world No. 42.

=== 2012 ===
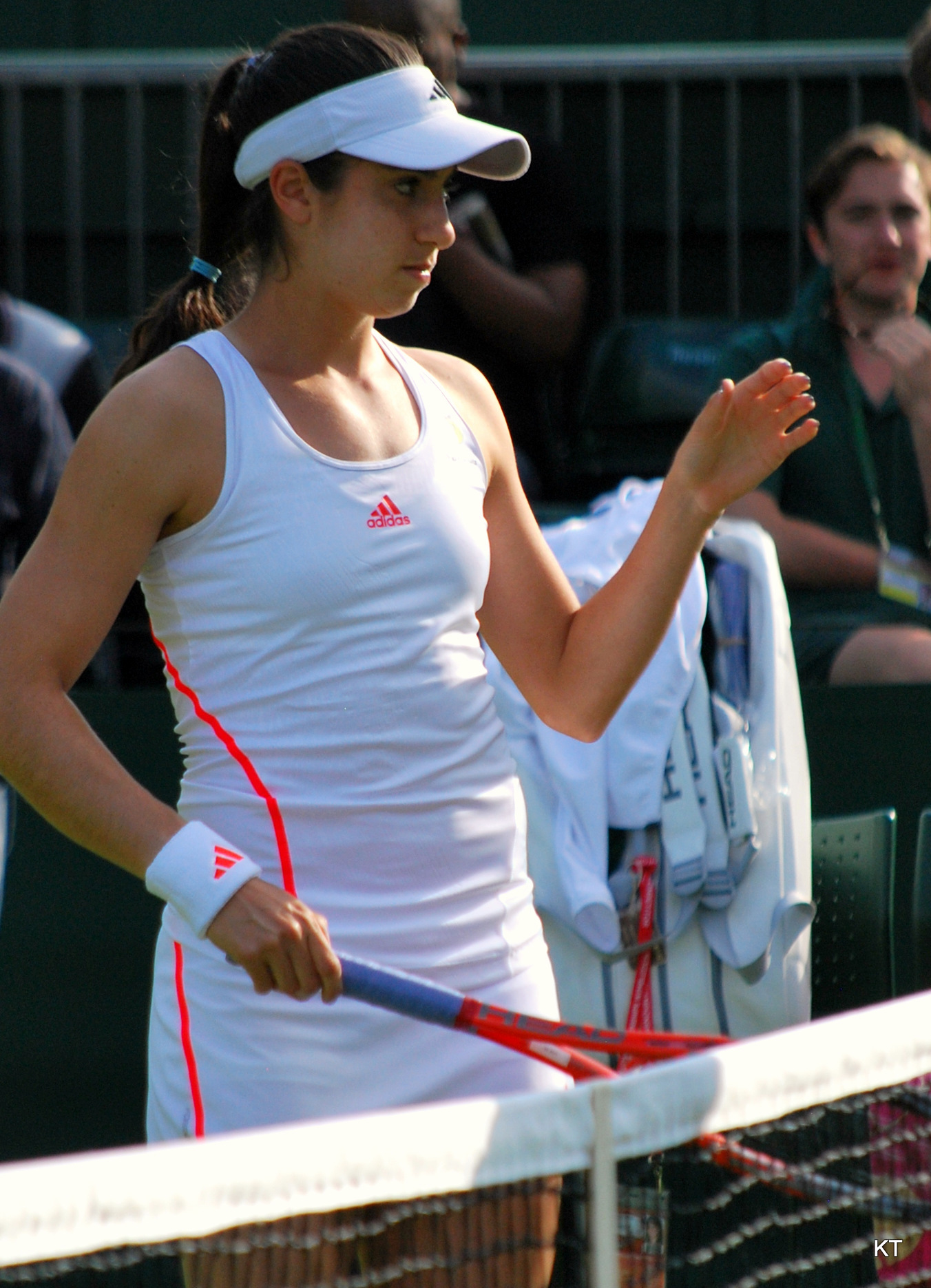
Wimbledon, 2012

McHale kicked off her 2012 season at the Auckland Open where she lost in the second round to third seed Svetlana Kuznetsova. At the Australian Open, McHale upset 24th seed Lucie Šafářová in the first round. She won her second-round match against Marina Erakovic, before being defeated by 13th seed Jelena Janković.

In February, McHale played in the Fed Cup tie against Belarus. She won both of her matches over Anastasiya Yakimova and Darya Kustova. In the end, the USA defeated Belarus 5–0. At the Open GdF Suez, McHale reached the second round where she lost to Yanina Wickmayer. Playing in Doha at the Qatar Open, McHale reached the quarterfinal where she was defeated by fourth seed Agnieszka Radwańska. Seeded 32nd at Indian Wells, McHale got a bye to the second round, and won her match over Elena Vesnina. In the third round, she stunned third seed Petra Kvitová. McHale's run came to an end when she lost in the fourth round to 18th seed Angelique Kerber. McHale wrapped up March by playing at the Miami Open. She was defeated in the second round by 29th seed Petra Cetkovská.

McHale started her clay-court season in Charleston at the Family Circle Cup. Seeded 11th, she lost in the first round to Aleksandra Wozniak. She was then selected for the Fed Cup World Group Tie in Kharkiv, Ukraine. McHale won both of her rubbers over Lesia Tsurenko and Elina Svitolina. The USA went on to defeat Ukraine 5–0. At the Madrid Open, McHale was defeated in the second round by fifth seed Sam Stosur. In Rome at the Italian Open, McHale lost in the second round to second seed, defending champion, and eventual champion Maria Sharapova. At the Brussels Open, she was defeated in the first round by fourth seed Dominika Cibulková. Competing at the French Open, McHale won her first two rounds over qualifiers Kiki Bertens and Lauren Davis, the lost in the third round to seventh seed and defending champion Li Na.

Seeded seventh at the Birmingham Classic, her first grass-court tournament of the year, McHale was defeated in the second round by Elena Vesnina. In Eastbourne, McHale upset third seed Caroline Wozniacki in the first round. She lost in the second round to Anastasia Pavlyuchenkova. Seeded 28th at the Wimbledon Championships, McHale was defeated in the third round by eighth seed Angelique Kerber.

Seeded fifth at the Carlsbad Open, McHale reached the quarterfinal where she lost to top seed Marion Bartoli. Representing the United States at the Summer Olympics, McHale was defeated in the first round by 11th seed Ana Ivanovic.

In Montreal at the Rogers Cup, McHale lost in her third-round match to Canadian wildcard Aleksandra Wozniak. At the Western & Southern Open, McHale retired from her first-round match against Chanelle Scheepers due to gastrointestinal illness. Seeded 21st at the US Open, she lost in the first round to Kiki Bertens.

In Beijing at the China Open, McHale was defeated in the first round by 11th seed Ana Ivanovic. McHale played her final tournament of the season at Osaka. Seeded third, she lost in the first round to eventual finalist Chang Kai-chen.

McHale ended the year ranked world No. 33.

=== 2013 ===
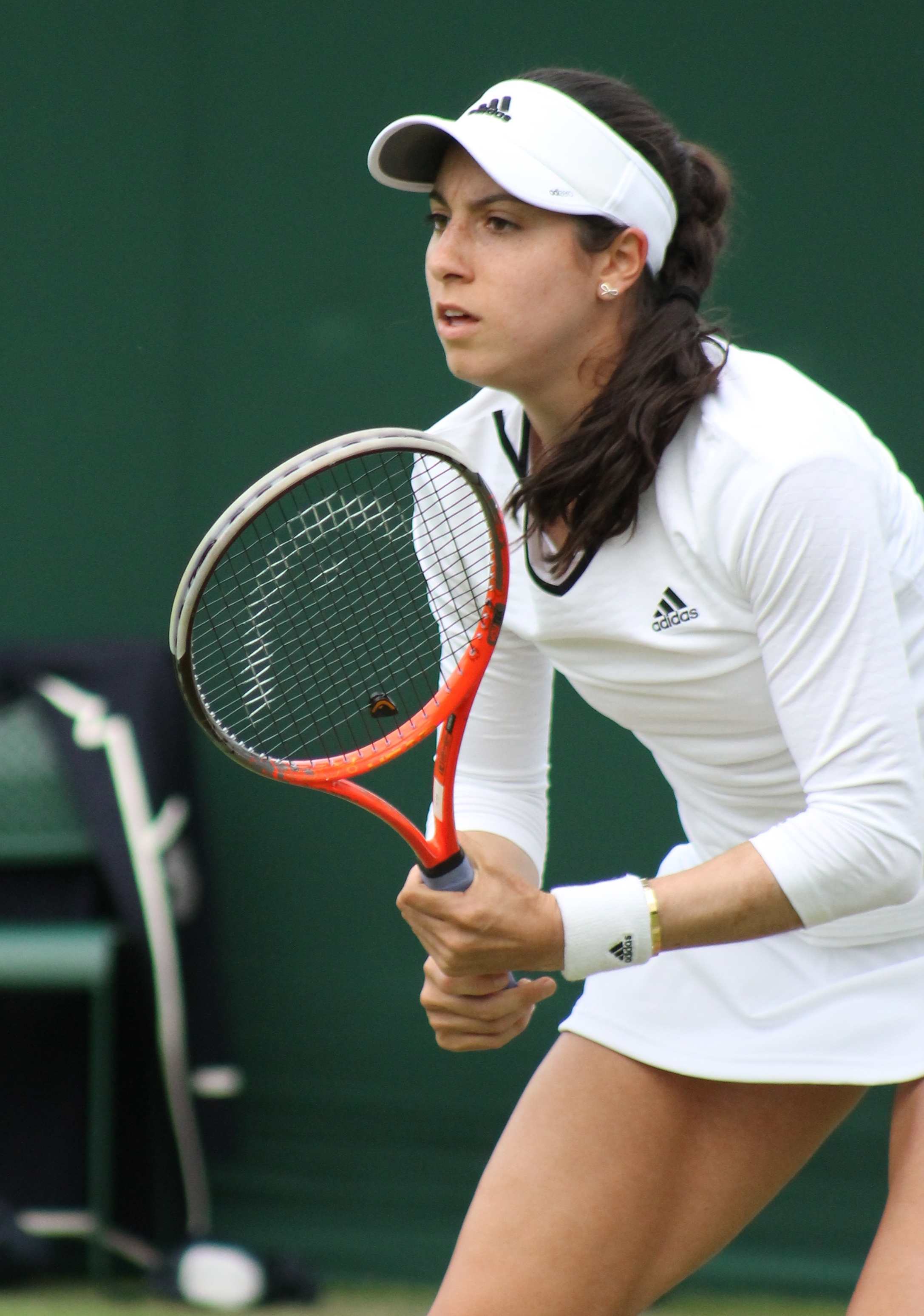
Wimbledon, 2013

McHale started her 2013 season at the Auckland Open. Seeded seventh, she lost in the opening round to Pauline Parmentier. At the Sydney International, McHale was defeated in the first round by fourth seed Li Na. McHale's slump continued at the Australian Open where she fell in the first round to Yulia Putintseva.

In Paris at the Open GdF Suez, McHale recorded her first win of the year by defeating French wildcard Pauline Parmentier in the first round. She lost in the second round to third seed and last year finalist Marion Bartoli. At the Qatar Open, McHale suffered a double bagel defeat in the third round to top seed, defending champion, and eventual champion Victoria Azarenka. Playing at the Dubai Tennis Championships, she lost in the second round of qualifying to Kurumi Nara. At the Indian Wells Open, she was defeated in the second round by 13th seed Maria Kirilenko. At the Miami Open, McHale lost in the second round to 15th seed Roberta Vinci.

McHale began her clay-court season in Charleston at the Family Circle Cup where she was defeated in the first round by 12th seed Varvara Lepchenko. At the Madrid Open, McHale progressed through the qualifying event before falling in the second round to second seed and eventual finalist Maria Sharapova. Competing in Rome at the Italian Open, McHale defeated Karin Knapp in the first round; she lost in the second round to seventh seed Sara Errani. Seeded sixth at the Internationaux de Strasbourg, McHale was defeated in the first round by Lauren Davis. At the French Open, McHale lost her first-round match to Jana Čepelová.

In Eastbourne at the Eastbourne International, McHale was defeated in the first round by Yanina Wickmayer. At the Wimbledon Championships, she lost in the second round to 15th seed and eventual champion Marion Bartoli.

McHale began her preparation for the US Open at the San Jose Open where she was defeated in the first round by seventh seed Urszula Radwańska. At the Washington Open, McHale lost in the first round to seventh seed, defending champion, and eventual champion Magdaléna Rybáriková. At the Rogers Cup, McHale was defeated in the first round of qualifying by Julia Glushko. In Ohio at the Western & Southern Open, she lost in the first round of qualifying to Lourdes Domínguez Lino. At the US Open, McHale won her first two rounds over Julia Görges and Elina Svitolina. In the third round, she faced 13th seed, Ana Ivanovic. After winning the first set, she served for the match at 5–4 up in the second set but was broken, and ultimately lost the match in three sets. Despite the loss, she earned praise for her fighting performance against the former world No. 1.

Playing in Quebec City at the Challenge Bell, she reached the semifinals where she was defeated by sixth seed Marina Erakovic. At the Ladies Linz, McHale lost in the first round of qualifying to Stephanie Vogt. In Luxembourg, McHale was defeated in the second round of qualifying by Katarzyna Piter. McHale's final tournament of the season was the Internationaux de la Vienne in Poitiers. Seeded sixth, she lost in the first round to Heather Watson.

McHale ended the year ranked world No. 68.

=== 2014 ===
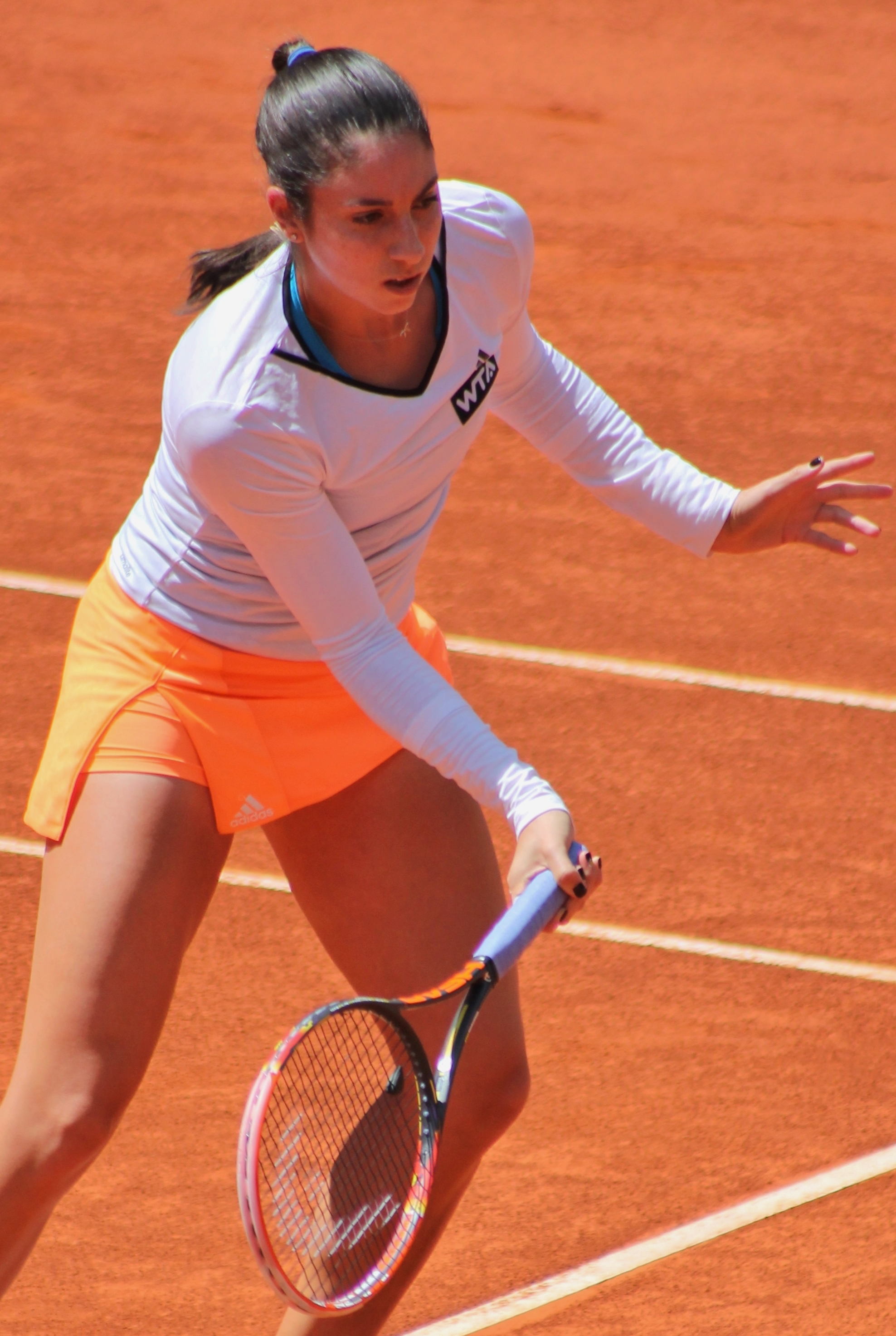
McHale at the 2014 Madrid Open

McHale commenced her 2014 season at the Auckland Open where she lost in the first round to Garbiñe Muguruza. Getting through qualifying at the Sydney International, McHale was defeated in the second round by second seed Petra Kvitová. At the Australian Open, McHale lost in the second round to tenth seed Caroline Wozniacki.

During the Fed Cup tie versus Italy, McHale played one rubber; she lost to Karin Knapp. In the end, Italy defeated the USA 3–1. Playing in Acapulco, McHale reached her first WTA Tour final where she was defeated by top seed Dominika Cibulková. At the Indian Wells Open, McHale lost in the first round to qualifier Casey Dellacqua. Competing at the Miami Open, she was defeated in the second round by 24th seed Kaia Kanepi.

McHale got her French Open preparation underway at the Family Circle Cup. She lost in the first round to qualifier Alla Kudryavtseva. At the Madrid Open, she was defeated in the second round by eighth seed and eventual champion Maria Sharapova. Coming through qualifying in Rome at the Italian Open, McHale lost in the third round to Zhang Shuai. Playing at the Internationaux de Strasbourg, her final tournament before the French Open, McHale reached the semifinal round where she was defeated by qualifier and eventual finalist Sílvia Soler Espinosa. At the French Open, McHale lost in the first round to 32nd seed Elena Vesnina.

She started her grass-court season at the Birmingham Classic where she was defeated in the second round by second seed Sam Stosur. In Eastbourne, McHale fell in the second round of qualifying to Hsieh Su-wei. At the Wimbledon Championships, she lost in the first round to Chanelle Scheepers.

Kicking off her US Open Series at the Washington Open, McHale upset fourth seed and compatriot Sloane Stephens in the first round. She was defeated in the second round by Vania King. In Montreal at the Rogers Cup, she lost in the final round of qualifying to Kiki Bertens. At the Western & Southern Open, McHale was defeated in the second round by ninth seed and eventual finalist Ana Ivanovic. Competing in New York at the US Open, she lost in her second-round match to 16th seed, former world number one, and two-time finalist Victoria Azarenka.

Seeded fourth at the first edition of the Hong Kong Open, McHale was defeated in the first round by Francesca Schiavone. At the Korea Open, she reached the semifinal round where she fell to fifth seed and eventual finalist Varvara Lepchenko. At the first edition of the Wuhan Open, McHale lost in the first round to tenth seed Jelena Janković. In Beijing at the China Open, she was defeated in the first round by 14th seed Flavia Pennetta. Seeded seventh at the Japan Women's Open, McHale lost in the first round to Luksika Kumkhum.

McHale ended the year ranked world No. 54.

=== 2015 ===
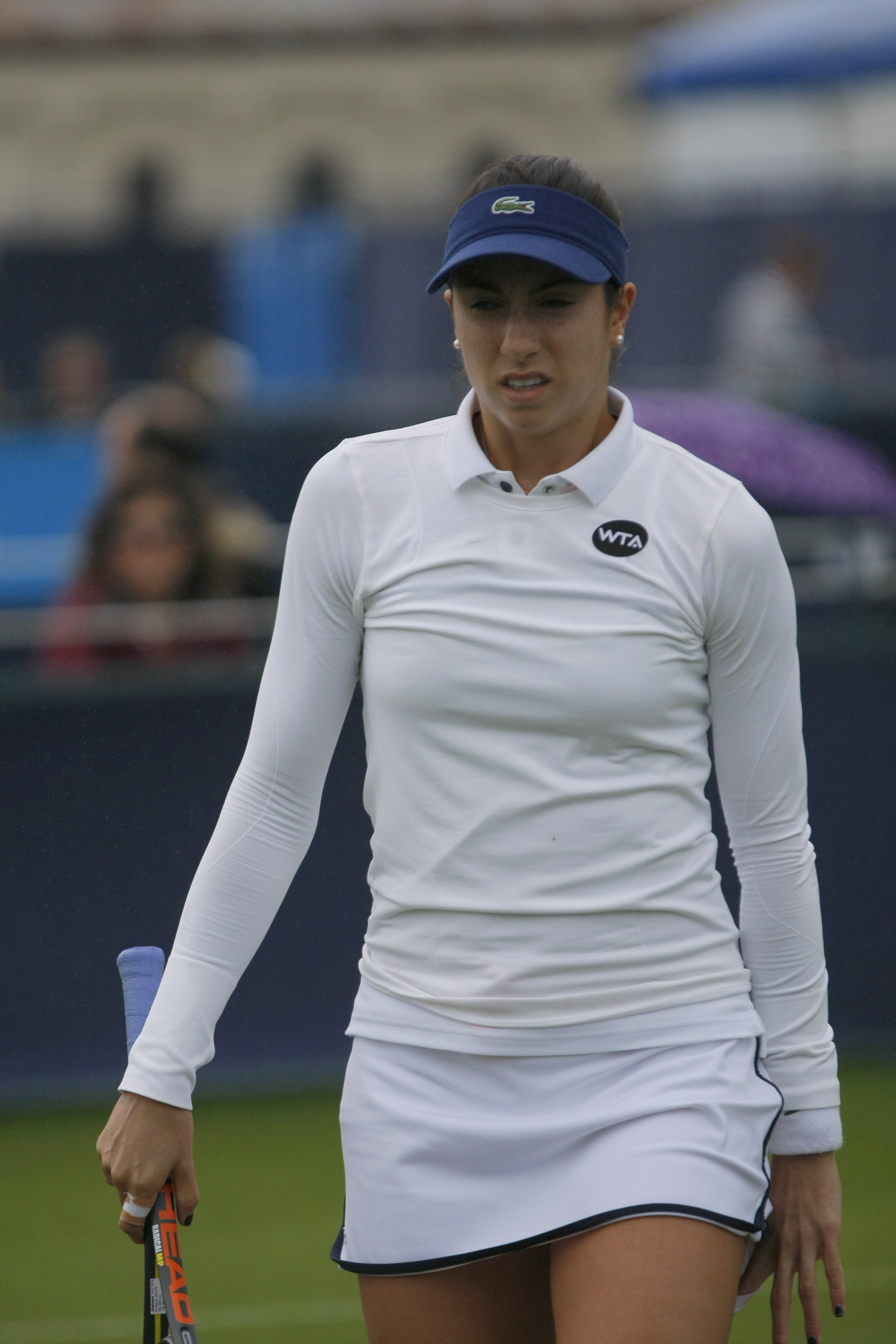
At the 2015 Eastbourne International

In Hobart at the Hobart International, she retired from her first-round match against eighth seed Alison Riske due to a right shoulder injury. At the Australian Open, McHale won her first-round match over Stéphanie Foretz in a three-set thriller. She was defeated in the second round by Carina Witthöft.

Beginning her clay-court season at the Family Circle Cup, McHale lost in the first round to qualifier Danka Kovinić. During the Fed Cup tie against Italy, McHale played one rubber; she was defeated by Flavia Pennetta. In the end, Italy won the tie over the USA 3–2. At the Morocco Open, McHale lost in the second round to fourth seed and eventual champion, Elina Svitolina. Coming through qualifying at the Madrid Open, she was defeated in the second round by fifth seed Caroline Wozniacki. Entering the main draw as a qualifier at the Italian Open, McHale reached the quarterfinal round where she lost to fellow qualifier Daria Gavrilova. In Strasbourg, she was defeated in the first round by top seed and compatriot Madison Keys. At the French Open, McHale lost in the first round to qualifier Lourdes Domínguez Lino.

McHale started her grass-court season at the Nottingham Open where she was defeated in the second round by top seed Agnieszka Radwańska. At the Birmingham Classic, McHale lost in the third round to Kateřina Siniaková. Coming through the qualifying rounds at Eastbourne, McHale was defeated in the first round by Camila Giorgi. At Wimbledon, she lost in the second round to 18th seed and 2013 finalist Sabine Lisicki.

Beginning her preparation for the US Open at the Washington Open, McHale was defeated in the quarterfinal round by eventual finalist Anastasia Pavlyuchenkova. Getting past qualifying in Cincinnati, she lost in the first round to Camila Giorgi. McHale fell in the final round of qualifying at the Connecticut Open to Magdaléna Rybáriková. In New York at the US Open, McHale was defeated in her first-round match by Petra Cetkovská.

Seeded sixth at the Japan Women's Open, McHale reached the semifinal round where she lost to eventual finalist Magda Linette. At the Korea Open, she was defeated in the second round by second seed Anna Karolína Schmiedlová. Playing at the Wuhan Open, she lost in the final round of qualifying to Mariana Duque Mariño. At the China Open, McHale was defeated in the final round of qualifying by Lara Arruabarrena. At the Hong Kong Open, she retired from her first-round match against Wang Yafan due to a left elbow injury. This tournament ended up being her final tournament of the season.

McHale ended the year ranked world No. 64.

=== 2016 ===
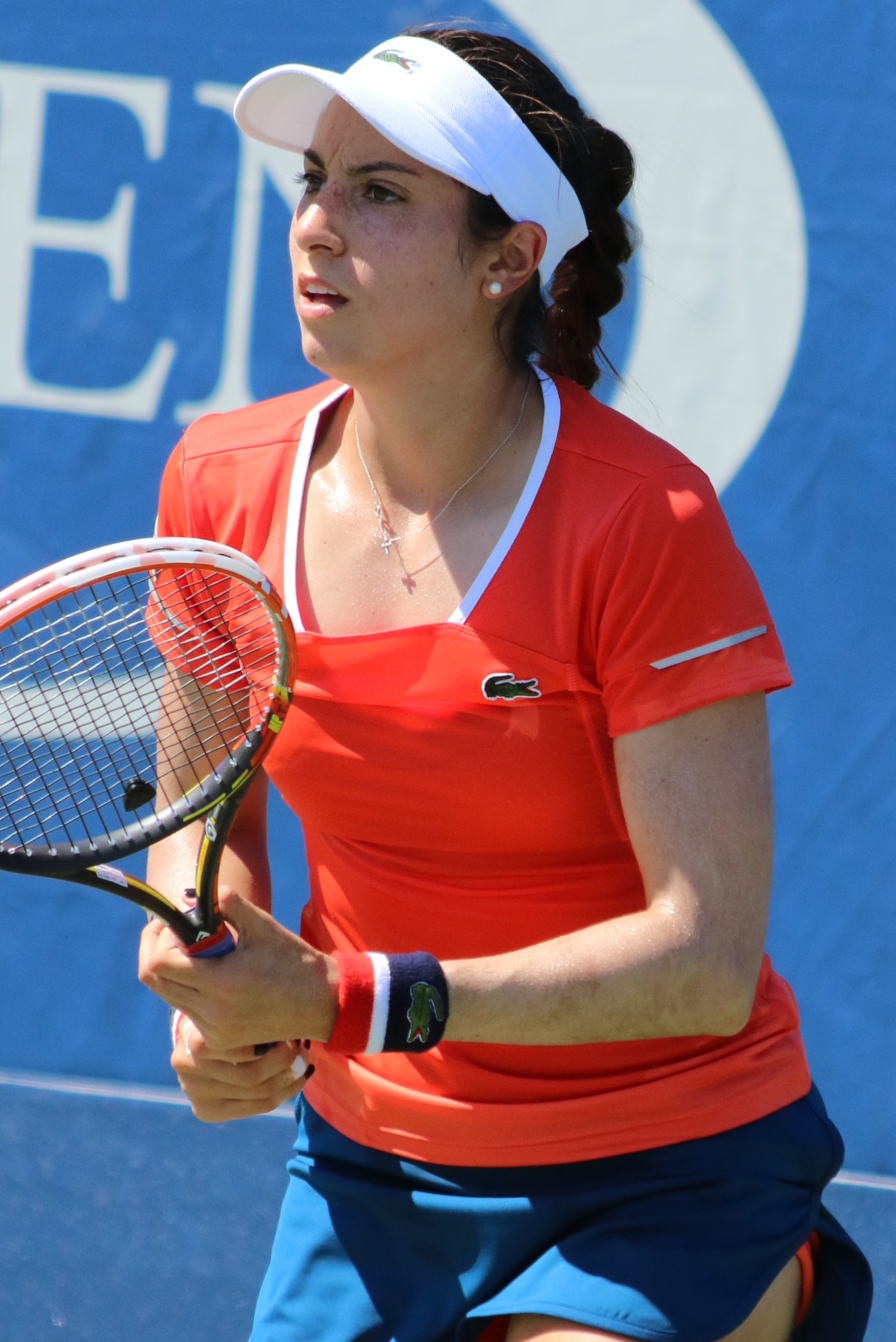
McHale at the 2016 US Open

McHale won her first WTA Tour doubles title with Han Xinyun, defeating Kimberly Birrell/Jarmila Wolfe in the final of the Hobart International. As the top seed at the first edition of the Tennis Championships of Maui, McHale won the tournament beating compatriot Raveena Kingsley in the final. In the Mexican Open, McHale reached the semifinal where she was defeated by Dominika Cibulková. At the Monterrey Open, McHale retired from her second-round match against qualifier Nicole Gibbs due to dizziness. Playing at the Indian Wells Open, McHale stunned fourth seed Garbiñe Muguruza in her second-round match. She lost in the third round to 26th seed Sam Stosur.

McHale began her clay-court season at the Charleston Open and lost in the first round to Lourdes Domínguez Lino. During the Fed Cup tie versus Australia, McHale won her only rubber played over Sam Stosur. In the end, the USA defeated Australia 4–0.

In Paris at the French Open, she lost in the first round to French wildcard Myrtille Georges. At the Wimbledon Championships, in the second round, McHale won the first set and led 2–0 in the third set before being defeated by top seed, defending champion, and eventual champion Serena Williams. Competing at the US Open, she lost in the second round to seventh seed and previous year's finalist Roberta Vinci.

Seeded seventh at the Japan Women's Open, McHale won her first WTA Tour singles title beating Kateřina Siniaková in the final. Her final tournament of the season was the Tianjin Open where she was defeated in the first round by Evgeniya Rodina.

McHale ended the year ranked world No. 45.

=== 2017 ===
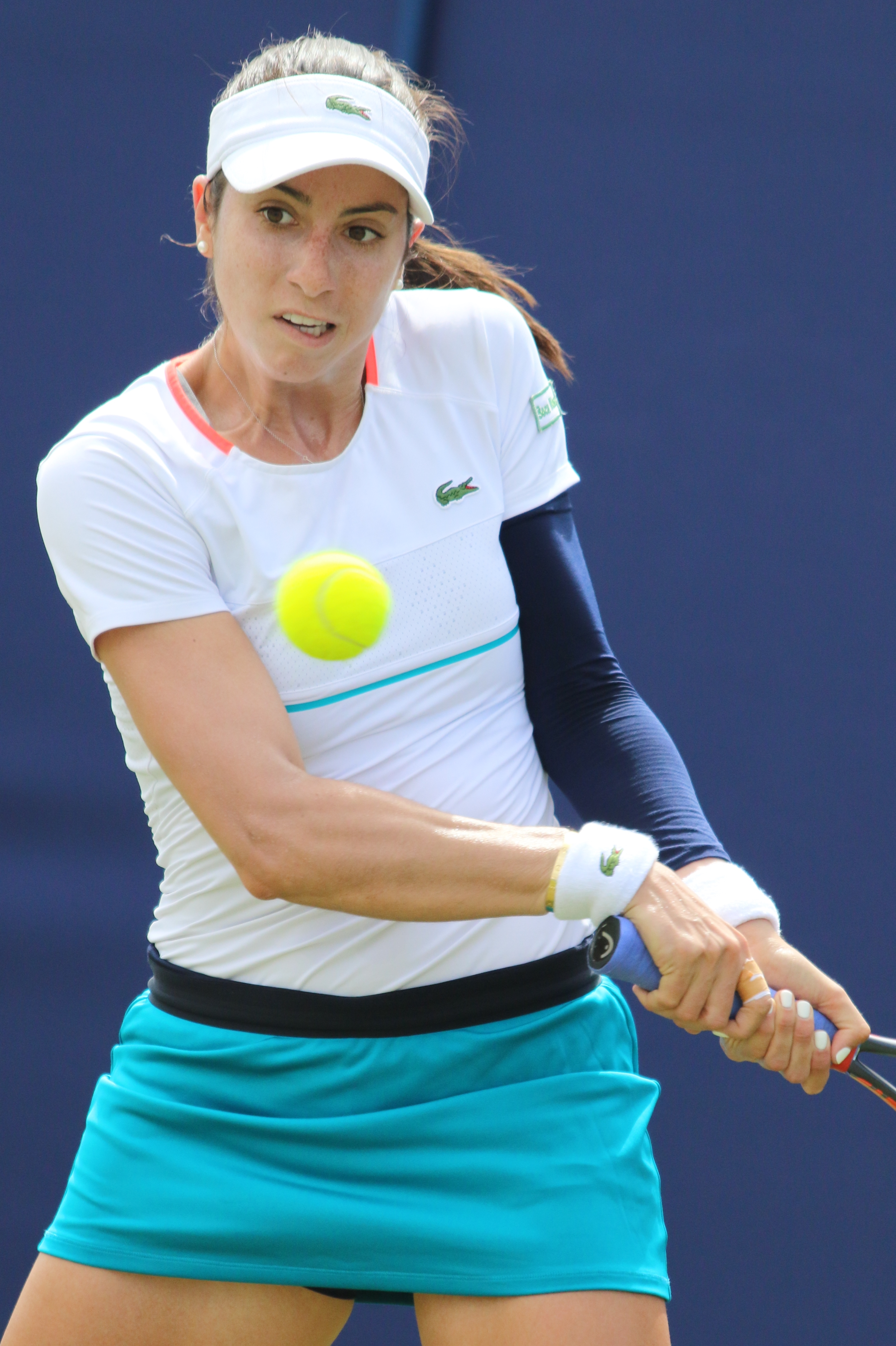
McHale at the 2017 Eastbourne International

McHale began the year at the Brisbane International. She beat Sara Errani in her first-round match and lost in the second to eventual finalist Alizé Cornet. Qualifying for the Sydney International, McHale was defeated in the second round by second seed, 2013 champion, and eventual finalist Agnieszka Radwańska. At the Australian Open, she lost in the first round to Kristína Kučová.

Coming through qualifying at the Qatar Ladies Open, McHale was defeated in the first round by sixth seed Elena Vesnina. At Dubai, she won her first two rounds over 13th seed Kiki Bertens and Naomi Osaka but lost her third-round match to seventh seed and eventual champion Elina Svitolina. Seeded fifth at the Mexican Open, McHale reached the semifinal where she was defeated by second seed Kristina Mladenovic. In March, McHale competed at Indian Wells and lost in the first round to lucky loser Evgeniya Rodina. Despite taking the first set 6–0, she was defeated in her second-round match at the Miami Open by sixth seed Garbiñe Muguruza. Seeded eighth at the Monterrey Open, she lost in the first round to qualifier Tereza Martincová.

McHale began her clay-court season at the Prague Open where she was defeated in the first round by qualifier Beatriz Haddad Maia. At Madrid, she lost in the first round to Spanish wildcard Lara Arruabarrena. Playing in Rome at the Italian Open, McHale was defeated in the first round by three-time champion Maria Sharapova. At Strasbourg, she lost in the second round to fourth seed Carla Suárez Navarro. McHale was defeated in the first round at the French Open by eighth seed and 2009 champion Svetlana Kuznetsova.

She started her grass-court season at the Nottingham Open and lost in the second round to Maria Sakkari. At Birmingham, McHale was defeated in the first round by Coco Vandeweghe. McHale retired from her first-round match at Eastbourne against qualifier Duan Yingying. At Wimbledon, she fell in the second round to ninth seed and 2012 finalist Agnieszka Radwańska.

As the top seed at the Hungarian Pro Circuit Ladies Open, McHale lost in the first round to eventual finalist Danka Kovinić.

Seeded eighth at the Washington Open, she was defeated in the first round by Eugenie Bouchard. At the Canadian Open, McHale lost in the final round of qualifying to Kirsten Flipkens. Playing in Western & Southern Open, McHale was defeated in the first round of qualifying by Petra Martić. After losing in the final round of qualifying at the Cincinnati, she made it into the main draw as a lucky loser and lost in the first round to sixth seed Anastasia Pavlyuchenkova. Competing in New York at the US Open, McHale beat 19th seed Anastasia Pavlyuchenkova in her first-round match. She was defeated in the second round by Daria Kasatkina.

As the defending champion at the Japan Women's Open, McHale made it to the semifinal where she lost to qualifier and eventual champion Zarina Diyas. Seeded eighth at the Korea Open, she was defeated in the first round by qualifier Arantxa Rus. Coming through qualifying at the Wuhan Open, McHale lost in the second round to eventual champion Caroline Garcia. At the China Open, she entered the draw as a qualifier and stunned 15th seed and recent US Open champion Sloane Stephens in the first round. She was defeated in the second round by Sorana Cîrstea. At the Tianjin Open, McHale lost in her quarterfinal match to qualifier Sara Errani. She competed in her final tournament of the season at the Kremlin Cup where she was defeated in the first round by Lesia Tsurenko.

McHale ended the year ranked world No. 63.

=== 2018 ===
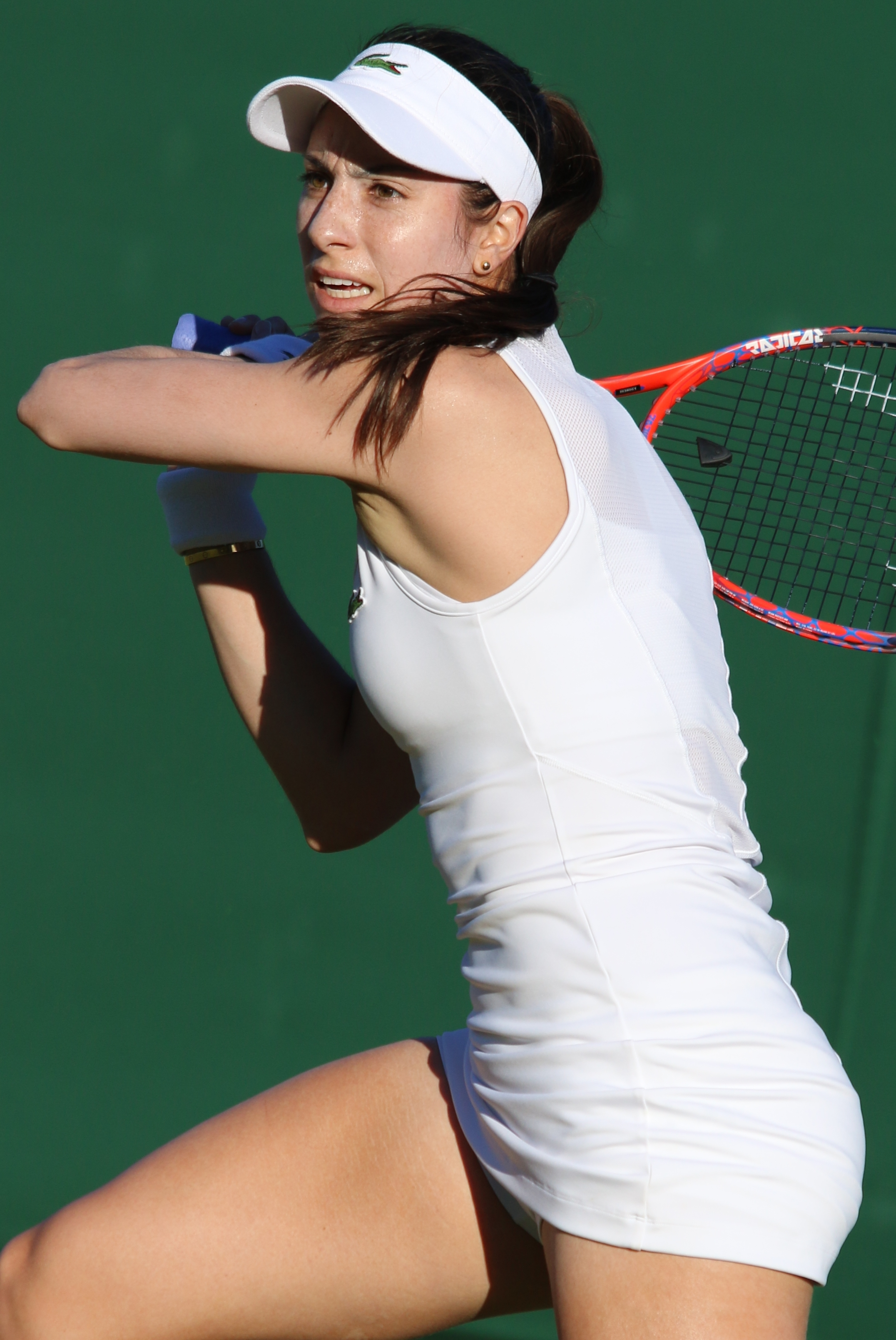
McHale at the 2018 Wimbledon Championships

She began her 2018 season at the Auckland Open losing in the first round to Taylor Townsend. Playing at the Sydney International, McHale retired from her first round of qualifying match against Kateryna Bondarenko. At the Australian Open, she was defeated in the first round by Aliaksandra Sasnovich.

As the top seed at the first edition of the Newport Beach Challenger, McHale lost in the first round to compatriot Jamie Loeb. At Doha, she was defeated in the final round of qualifying by Bernarda Pera. In Dubai, she lost in the second round of qualifying to Sam Stosur. At the Mexican Open, McHale was defeated in the first round by fifth seed Irina-Camelia Begu. Competing in California at the Indian Wells Open, she lost in the first round to Kateřina Siniaková. At the Miami Open, she was defeated in the third round by third seed Garbiñe Muguruza.

McHale began her clay-court season at the Charleston Open. She lost in the second round to third seed and defending champion Daria Kasatkina. At the İstanbul Cup, she was defeated in the second round by seventh seed Irina-Camelia Begu. At the Morocco Open, she lost in the first round to lucky loser Magdalena Fręch. At the Madrid Open, she fell in the first round of qualifying to Kirsten Flipkens. In Rome at the Italian Open, she lost in the first round of qualifying to Kateřina Siniaková. At the Nürnberger Versicherungscup in Germany, McHale was defeated in the second round by eventual champion Johanna Larsson. At the French Open, she lost her first-round match to qualifier Alexandra Dulgheru.

In Eastbourne, McHale was defeated in the final round of qualifying by Yulia Putintseva. At the Wimbledon Championships, she lost in the first round to Vera Lapko.

McHale started her US Open Series at the Silicon Valley Classic where she was defeated in the first round by eventual finalist Maria Sakkari. Coming through qualifying at the Rogers Cup, she fell in the first round to Anastasia Pavlyuchenkova. At the Cincinnati Open, McHale lost in the final round of qualifying to Varvara Lepchenko. At the Connecticut Open, she was defeated in the first round of qualifying by Sam Stosur. Competing in New York at the US Open, she lost in the first round to qualifier and compatriot Francesca Di Lorenzo.

Playing at the Tournoi de Québec, McHale was defeated in the second round by eighth seed and eventual champion Pauline Parmentier. At the Guangzhou International Open, she lost in the second round to fourth seed and last year finalist, Aleksandra Krunić. At the Wuhan Open, McHale was defeated in the first round of qualifying by Polona Hercog. At the China Open, she fell in the final round of qualifying to Yulia Putintseva. Playing at the Hong Kong Open, she lost in the second round to sixth seed and eventual finalist Wang Qiang. Seeded eighth at the Classic of Macon in Georgia, McHale was defeated in the first round by compatriot Whitney Osuigwe. Seeded eighth at the Tyler Pro Challenge, her final tournament of the season, she lost in the second round to compatriot Kayla Day.

McHale ended the year ranked world No. 155.

=== 2019 ===
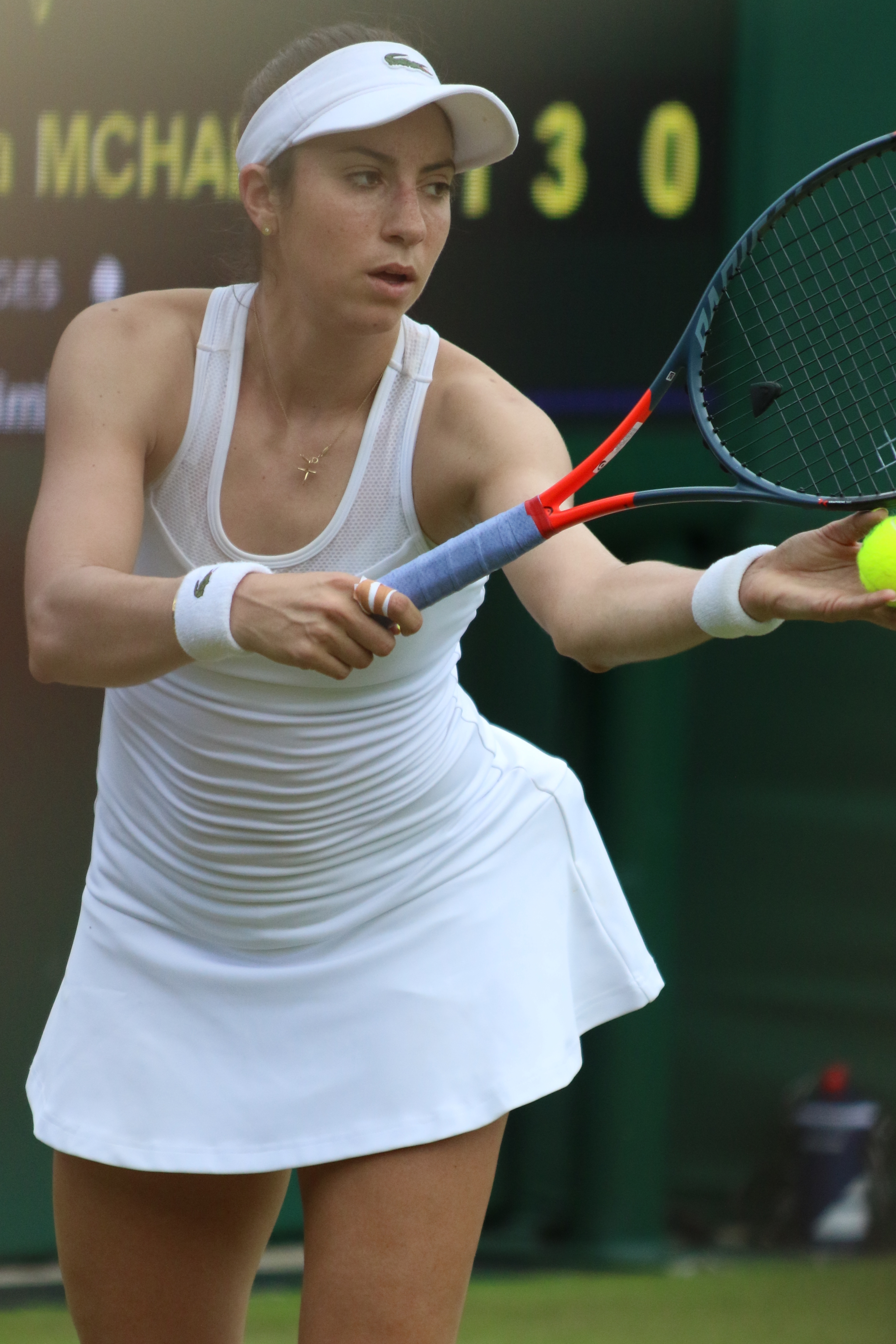
McHale at the 2019 Wimbledon Championships.

McHale started her season at the Brisbane International where she lost in the final round of qualifying to Australian wildcard Destanee Aiava. At the Australian Open, she failed to make the main draw since she was defeated in the final round of qualifying by Varvara Lepchenko.

Playing at the Newport Beach Challenger, she fell in the third round to second seed Tatjana Maria. At the Dow Tennis Classic, she was defeated in her quarterfinal match by fourth seed and eventual finalist, Jessica Pegula. Coming through qualifying at the Mexican Open, McHale reached the second round, losing to third seed Donna Vekić. She qualified for the Indian Wells Open beating Fanny Stollár and Vera Zvonareva. In the main draw, she defeated 30th seed Anastasia Pavlyuchenkova in her second-round match. She was upset in the third round by compatriot and former world No. 1, Venus Williams. At the Miami Open, McHale lost in the first round of qualifying to Mandy Minella. In Mexico at the Monterrey Open, she was defeated in the first round of qualifying by Kristína Kučová.

McHale started her clay-court season at the Copa Colsanitas where she lost in the first round to seventh seed Sara Sorribes Tormo. At the Prague Open, McHale was defeated in the first round of qualifying by Anna Kalinskaya. Playing at Cagnes-sur-Mer, McHale won the tournament beating third seed Stefanie Vögele in the final. At the Empire Slovak Open, she made it to the semifinal where she lost to Anna Blinkova. At the French Open, she was defeated in the first round of qualifying by Francesca Di Lorenzo.

Despite losing in the final round of qualifying at the Rosmalen Championships, she made it into the main draw as a lucky loser but lost in the first round to Polona Hercog. At the Mallorca Open, McHale was defeated in the first round of qualifying by Tereza Martincová. She entered the Wimbledon Championships also as a lucky loser and lost in the first round to British wildcard Harriet Dart.

McHale began her preparation for the US Open at the Washington Open where she upset seventh seed Anastasia Pavlyuchenkova in the first round. She was defeated in the second round by compatriot Caty McNally. At the Canadian Open, McHale lost in the final round of qualifying to Ajla Tomljanović. As the top seed at the first edition of the Thoreau Tennis Open, she was defeated in the second round by qualifier Olga Govortsova. At the US Open, she lost in the second round of qualifying to Peng Shuai.

Seeded 12th at the New Haven Challenger, McHale was defeated in the third round by seventh seed and eventual champion Anna Blinkova. At the Japan Women's Open, she lost in the second round to second seed Veronika Kudermetova. Coming through qualifying at the Wuhan Open, McHale was defeated in the second round by Dayana Yastremska. In Beijing at the China Open, she beat after qualifying two-time champion Svetlana Kuznetsova in the first round, and lost to 16th seed Caroline Wozniacki in the second. McHale played her final tournament of the season at the Tianjin Open and suffered a first-round loss by eighth seed Magda Linette.

She ended the year ranked 85.

=== 2020 ===
McHale kicked off her 2020 season at Auckland where she lost in the second round to top seed and eventual champion, Serena Williams. Entering the Hobart International main draw after coming through qualifying, McHale was defeated in the first round by top seed Elise Mertens. At the Australian Open, she lost in the first round to 13th seed Petra Martić.

Seeded third at the Newport Beach Challenger, McHale reached the quarterfinal where she was defeated by sixth seed and eventual finalist, Stefanie Vögele. At the Mexican Open, she lost her quarterfinal match to seventh seed and eventual champion, Heather Watson. Seeded 12th at the Indian Wells Challenger, she was defeated in the second round by Barbara Haas.

=== 2022-2024: Retirement, comeback ===
McHale announced her retirement from professional tennis, after losing in the first round of qualifying at the 2022 US Open.

McHale returned to professional tennis in November 2024, again competing on tour until July 2025.

== World TeamTennis ==
McHale has played three seasons with World TeamTennis, making her debut in 2016 with the New York Empire. She has since played for the Washington Kastles and the San Diego Aviators in 2019. It was announced she would be joining the San Diego Aviators during the 2020 WTT season set to begin July 12.

== Playing style ==
An aggressive baseliner, McHale is noted for her powerful forehand groundstrokes, as well as for her speed around the court. During her second-round match at Wimbledon in 2016, Eurosport commended McHale for displaying "superb court coverage". The New York Times has noted McHale's "booming" groundstrokes as one of her primary strengths.

== Performance timelines ==
Key
W	F	SF	QF	#R	RR	Q#	P#	DNQ	A	Z#	PO	G	S	B	NMS	NTI	P	NH

(W) winner; (F) finalist; (SF) semifinalist; (QF) quarterfinalist; (#R) rounds 4, 3, 2, 1; (RR) round-robin stage; (Q#) qualification round; (P#) preliminary round; (DNQ) did not qualify; (A) absent; (Z#) Davis/Fed Cup Zonal Group (with number indication) or (PO) play-off; (G) gold, (S) silver or (B) bronze Olympic/Paralympic medal; (NMS) not a Masters tournament; (NTI) not a Tier I tournament; (P) postponed; (NH) not held; (SR) strike rate (events won / competed); (W–L) win–loss record.
To avoid confusion and double counting, these charts are updated at the conclusion of a tournament or when the player's participation has ended.

Only main-draw results in WTA Tour, Grand Slam tournaments, Fed Cup/Billie Jean King Cup and Olympic Games are included in win–loss records.

=== Singles ===
Tournament	2009	2010	2011	2012	2013	2014	2015	2016	2017	2018	2019	2020	2021	2022	SR	W–L	Win %
Grand Slam tournaments
Australian Open	1R	A	1R	3R	1R	2R	2R	1R	1R	1R	Q3	1R	1R	Q3	0 / 11	4–11	27%
French Open	A	1R	1R	3R	1R	1R	1R	1R	1R	1R	Q1	2R	1R	Q3	0 / 11	3–11	21%
Wimbledon	A	A	2R	3R	2R	1R	2R	2R	2R	1R	1R	NH	1R	1R	0 / 11	7–11	39%
US Open	2R	1R	3R	1R	3R	2R	1R	2R	2R	1R	Q2	1R	2R	Q1	0 / 12	9–12	43%
Win–loss	1–2	0–2	3–4	6–4	3–4	2–4	2–4	2–4	2–4	0–4	0–1	1–3	1–4	0–1	0 / 45	23–45	34%
National representation
Billie Jean King Cup (Note: Formerly known as Fed Cup until 2020.)	A	F	PO	PO	A	1R	PO	PO	A	A	A	A			0 / 2	4–5	44%
Summer Olympics	NH			1R	NH			A	NH				A		0 / 1	0–1	0%
WTA 1000
Dubai / Qatar Open (Note: The first Premier 5 event of the year has switched back and forth between the Dubai Tennis Championships and the Qatar Ladies Open since 2009. Dubai was classified as a Premier 5 event from 2009 to 2011 before being succeeded by Doha for the 2012–2014 period. In 2015, Dubai regained its Premier 5 status while Doha was demoted to Premier status. The Premier 5 tournaments were reclassified as WTA 1000 tournaments in 2021.)	A	A	A	QF	3R	A	A	A	A	Q2	A	A	A	A	0 / 2	5–2	71%
Indian Wells Open	A	1R	3R	4R	2R	1R	2R	3R	1R	1R	3R	NH	A	Q2	0 / 10	11–10	52%
Miami Open	Q1	Q1	Q2	2R	2R	2R	2R	2R	2R	3R	Q1	NH	1R	Q2	0 / 8	8–8	50%
Madrid Open	A	A	A	2R	2R	2R	2R	3R	1R	Q1	A	NH	A	A	0 / 6	6–6	50%
Italian Open	A	A	2R	2R	2R	3R	QF	3R	1R	Q1	A	Q1	1R	A	0 / 8	10–8	56%
Canadian Open	A	A	A	3R	Q1	Q2	A	2R	Q2	1R	Q2	NH	Q2	Q2	0 / 3	3–3	50%
Cincinnati Open	A	3R	3R	1R	Q1	2R	1R	2R	Q1	Q2	A	3R	Q1	A	0 / 7	8–7	53%
Pan Pacific / Wuhan Open (Note: In 2014, the Pan Pacific Open was downgraded to a Premier event and replaced by the Wuhan Open. The Premier 5 tournaments were reclassified as WTA 1000 tournaments in 2021.)	A	1R	2R	A	A	1R	Q2	Q2	2R	Q1	2R	NH			0 / 5	3–5	38%
China Open	A	A	2R	1R	A	1R	Q2	1R	1R	Q2	2R	NH			0 / 6	2–6	25%
Career statistics
Tournaments	2	9	18	21	18	21	21	23	27	17	10	8	15	1	Career total: 211		
Titles	0	0	0	0	0	0	0	1	0	0	0	0	0	0	Career total: 1		
Finals	0	0	0	0	0	1	0	1	0	0	0	0	0	0	Career total: 2		
Overall win–loss	1–2	8–10	19–20	25–21	13–18	20–22	17–22	26–22	19–27	8–17	7–10	6–8	2–15	0–1	1 / 211	171–215	44%
Year-end ranking	218	115	42	33	68	54	64	45	63	155	85	80	158	319	$5,058,331		

=== Doubles ===
Tournament	2009	2010	2011	2012	2013	2014	2015	2016	2017	2018	2019	2020	2021	2022	W–L
Australian Open	A	A	A	1R	1R	1R	1R	1R	1R	A	A	1R	2R	A	1–8
French Open	A	A	A	2R	1R	1R	1R	2R	A	1R	A	1R	A	A	2–7
Wimbledon	A	A	3R	2R	2R	1R	1R	3R	1R	3R	A	NH	1R	A	8–9
US Open	1R	1R	1R	A	1R	2R	1R	A	1R	3R	2R	1R	1R	A	4–11
Win–loss	0–1	0–1	2–2	2–3	1–4	1–4	0–4	3–3	0–3	4–3	1–1	0–3	1–3	0–0	15–35

== WTA Tour finals ==
=== Singles: 2 (1 title, 1 runner-up) ===
Legend WTA 500 WTA 250 (1–1)	Finals by surface Hard (1–1)

Result	W–L	Date	Tournament	Tier	Surface	Opponents	Score
Loss	0–1	Mar 2014	Mexican Open	International (Note: The WTA International tournaments were reclassified as WTA 250 tournaments in 2021.)	Hard	(Slovakia) Dominika Cibulková	6–7^{(3–7)}, 6–4, 4–6
Win	1–1	Sep 2016	Japan Women's Open	International	Hard	(Czech Republic) Kateřina Siniaková	3–6, 6–4, 6–4

=== Doubles: 4 (2 titles, 2 runner-ups) ===
Legend WTA 250 (2–2)	Finals by surface Hard (2–2)

Result	W–L	Date	Tournament	Tier	Surface	Partner	Opponents	Score
Win	1–0	Jan 2016	Hobart International, Australia	International	Hard	(China) Han Xinyun	(Australia) Kimberly Birrell (Australia) Jarmila Wolfe	6–3, 6–0
Win	2–0	Oct 2016	Tianjin Open, China	International	Hard	(China) Peng Shuai	(China) Xu Yifan (Poland) Magda Linette	7–6^{(10–8)}, 6–0
Loss	2–1	Sep 2019	Japan Women's Open	International	Hard	(Russia) Valeria Savinykh	(Japan) Misaki Doi (Japan) Nao Hibino	6–3, 4–6, [4–10]
Loss	2–2	Aug 2021	Tennis in Cleveland, United States	WTA 250	Hard	(India) Sania Mirza	(Japan) Shuko Aoyama (Japan) Ena Shibahara	5–7, 3–6

== WTA 125 finals ==
=== Doubles: 1 (title) ===
Result	W–L	Date	Tournament	Surface	Partner	Opponents	Score
Win	1–0	Mar 2025	Puerto Vallarta Open, Mexico	Hard	(United States) Hanna Chang	(Australia) Maya Joint (Japan) Ena Shibahara	2–6, 6–2, [10–7]

== ITF Circuit finals ==
=== Singles: 6 (3 titles, 3 runner-ups) ===
Legend $80,000 tournaments (1–0) $50/60,000 tournaments (2–2) $10,000 tournaments (0–1)	Finals by surface Hard (1–2) Clay (2–1)

Result	W–L	Date	Tournament	Tier	Surface	Opponent	Score
Loss	0–1	Oct 2007	ITF Itu, Brazil	10,000	Clay	(Argentina) Mailen Auroux	5–7, 2–6
Loss	0–2	Oct 2009	Tennis Classic of Troy, United States	50,000	Hard	(United States) Alison Riske	4–6, 6–2, 5–7
Win	1–2	Jun 2011	Internazionale di Roma, Italy	50,000	Clay	(Russia) Ekaterina Ivanova	6–2, 6–4
Win	2–2	Jan 2016	Championships of Maui, United States	50,000	Hard	(United States) Raveena Kingsley	6–3, 4–6, 6–4
Win	3–2	May 2019	Open de Cagnes-sur-Mer, France	W80	Clay	(Switzerland) Stefanie Vögele	7–6^{(4)}, 6–2
Loss	3–3	Jan 2022	ITF Orlando Pro, United States	W60	Hard	(China) Zheng Qinwen	0–6, 1–6

=== Doubles: 7 (4 titles, 3 runner-ups) ===
Legend $75,000 tournaments (0–1) $50,000 tournaments (1–0) $25,000 tournaments (0–1) $10,000 tournaments (3–1)	Finals by surface Hard (2–2) Clay (2–1)

Result	W–L	Date	Tournament	Tier	Surface	Partner	Opponents	Score
Loss	0–1	May 2007	ITF Houston, United States	10,000	Hard	(United States) Kimberly Couts	(Bosnia and Herzegovina) Helena Bešović (Norway) Nina Munch-Søgaard	6–7^{(2)}, 5–7
Win	1–1	Oct 2007	ITF Serra Negra, Brazil	10,000	Clay	(United States) Allie Will	(Argentina) Mailen Auroux (Argentina) Tatiana Búa	7–5, 6–3
Win	2–1	Jun 2008	ITF Wichita, United States	10,000	Hard	(United States) Sloane Stephens	(Slovakia) Dominika Diešková (Brazil) Ana Clara Duarte	6–3, 6–2
Loss	2–2	Jun 2009	ITF Szczecin, Poland	25,000	Clay	(United States) Asia Muhammad	(Czech Republic) Michaela Paštiková (Slovakia) Lenka Tvarošková	1–6, 0–6
Win	3–2	May 2010	Internazionale di Roma, Italy	50,000	Clay	(Australia) Olivia Rogowska	(Russia) Iryna Brémond (Netherlands) Arantxa Rus	6–4, 6–1
Loss	3–3	Oct 2013	Internationaux de Poitiers, France	75,000	Hard (i)	(Romania) Monica Niculescu	(Czech Republic) Lucie Hradecká (Netherlands) Michaëlla Krajicek	6–7^{(5)}, 2–6
Win	4–3	Mar 2025	ITF Montreal, Canada	W15	Hard (i)	(Canada) Raphaëlle Lacasse	(United States) Sara Daavettila (United States) Sabastiani Leon	7–5, 6–1

== Wins over top-10 players ==
Season	2010	2011	2012	...	2016	Total
Wins	1	2	2		1	6

#	Player	Rank	Event	Surface	Rd	Score	CMR
2010
1.	(Belarus) Victoria Azarenka	No. 9	Charleston Open	Clay	2R	2–6, 2–2 ret.	No. 192
2011
2.	(Denmark) Caroline Wozniacki	No. 1	Cincinnati Open	Hard	2R	6–4, 7–5	No. 76
3.	(France) Marion Bartoli	No. 9	US Open	Hard	2R	7–6^{(7–2)}, 6–2	No. 55
2012
4.	(Czech Republic) Petra Kvitová	No. 3	Indian Wells Open	Hard	3R	2–6, 6–2, 6–3	No. 35
5.	(Denmark) Caroline Wozniacki	No. 7	Eastbourne International	Grass	1R	6–1, 6–7^{(7–9)}, 6–4	No. 30
2016
6.	(Spain) Garbiñe Muguruza	No. 4	Indian Wells Open	Hard	2R	7–5, 6–1	No. 62
