= 2022 Axion Open =

Tennis tournament

- Date: 18–24 April 2022
- Edition: 10th
- Category: ITF Women's World Tennis Tour
- Prize money: $60,000
- Surface: Clay / Outdoor
- Location: Chiasso, Switzerland

Champions

Singles
- (Italy) Lucia Bronzetti

Doubles
- (Czech Republic) Anastasia Dețiuc / (Czech Republic) Miriam Kolodziejová
← 2019 ·	Chiasso Open	· 2023 →

The 2022 Axion Open was a professional tennis tournament played on outdoor clay courts. It was the tenth edition of the tournament which was part of the 2022 ITF Women's World Tennis Tour. It took place in Chiasso, Switzerland between 18 and 24 April 2022.

== Singles main draw entrants ==
=== Seeds ===
Country	Player	Rank^{1}	Seed
ITA	Lucia Bronzetti	89	1
ROU	Mihaela Buzărnescu	123	2
ESP	Rebeka Masarova	132	3
	Anna Blinkova	136	4
SLO	Polona Hercog	137	5
HUN	Réka Luca Jani	140	6
SUI	Ylena In-Albon	142	7
NED	Arianne Hartono	166	8

- ^{1} Rankings are as of 11 April 2022.

=== Other entrants ===
The following players received wildcards into the singles main draw:

- (Switzerland) Alina Granwehr
- (Switzerland) Leonie Küng
- (Switzerland) Céline Naef
- (Switzerland) Sebastianna Scilipoti

The following players received entry as special exempts:

- (Italy) Martina Di Giuseppe
- (Cyprus) Raluca Șerban

The following players received entry from the qualifying draw:

- Erika Andreeva
- (Spain) Irene Burillo Escorihuela
- (Switzerland) Jenny Dürst
- (France) Elsa Jacquemot
- (Slovenia) Dalila Jakupović
- (Czech Republic) Miriam Kolodziejová
- (Czech Republic) Anna Sisková
- Natalia Vikhlyantseva

== Champions ==
=== Singles ===
- (Italy) Lucia Bronzetti def. (Switzerland) Simona Waltert, 2–6, 6–3, 6–3.

=== Doubles ===
- (Czech Republic) Anastasia Dețiuc / (Czech Republic) Miriam Kolodziejová def. (Spain) Aliona Bolsova / Oksana Selekhmeteva, 6–3, 1–6, [10–8]
