= 2026 Dubrovnik Open =

- Date: 23–29 March 2026
- Edition: 1st
- Category: WTA 125
- Prize money: $115,000
- Surface: Clay
- Location: Dubrovnik, Croatia

Champions

Singles
- (Spain) Andrea Lázaro García

Doubles
- (Czech Republic) Anastasia Dețiuc / (Czech Republic) Dominika Šalková
- Dubrovnik Open

The 2026 Dubrovnik Open was a professional women's tennis tournament played on outdoor clay courts. It was the first edition of the tournament and part of the 2026 WTA 125 tournaments. It took place at the Tennis Club Dubrovnik in Dubrovnik, Croatia between 23 and 29 March 2026.

== Singles main draw entrants ==
=== Seeds ===
Country	Player	Rank^{1}	Seed
CRO	Petra Marčinko	76	1
SLO	Veronika Erjavec	91	2
EGY	Mayar Sherif	107	3
GER	Tamara Korpatsch	112	4
	Anastasia Pavlyuchenkova	114	5
NED	Suzan Lamens	119	6
UKR	Anhelina Kalinina	127	7
POL	Maja Chwalińska	128	8

- ^{1} Rankings as of 16 March 2026.

=== Other entrants ===
The following players received a wildcard into the singles main draw:

- (Croatia) Lucija Ćirić Bagarić
- (Morocco) Yasmine Kabbaj
- (Croatia) Ana Konjuh
- (Croatia) Tena Lukas

The following players received entry from the qualifying draw:

- (Slovenia) Polona Hercog
- (Serbia) Mia Ristić
- (Spain) Sara Sorribes Tormo
- (Hungary) Amarissa Tóth

The following player received entry as a lucky loser:

- (Germany) Noma Noha Akugue

=== Withdrawals ===
Before the tournament

- (Hungary) Anna Bondár → replaced by (Italy) Nuria Brancaccio
- (Belgium) Sofia Costoulas → replaced by (North Macedonia) Lina Gjorcheska
- (Hungary) Dalma Gálfi → replaced by (Slovenia) Tamara Zidanšek
- (Austria) Julia Grabher → replaced by (Spain) Guiomar Maristany
- (United Kingdom) Francesca Jones → replaced by Elena Pridankina
- (Austria) Sinja Kraus → replaced by (Italy) Lisa Pigato
- (Netherlands) Arantxa Rus → replaced by (Germany) Noma Noha Akugue (LL)
- (Romania) Elena-Gabriela Ruse → replaced by (Ukraine) Anhelina Kalinina
- (Germany) Ella Seidel → replaced by (Spain) Andrea Lázaro García
- (Latvia) Darja Semeņistaja → replaced by (Serbia) Teodora Kostović
- (Hungary) Panna Udvardy → replaced by (Spain) Leyre Romero Gormaz

=== Retirements ===
- Anastasia Pavlyuchenkova (dizziness)

== Doubles entrants ==
=== Seeds ===
Country	Player	Country	Player	Rank^{1}	Seed
CZE	Jesika Malečková	CZE	Miriam Škoch	137	1
BEL	Magali Kempen		Elena Pridankina	160	2

- Rankings as of 16 March 2026.

=== Other entrants ===
The following pair received a wildcard into the doubles main draw:

- (Croatia) Lucija Ćirić Bagarić / (Croatia) Ana Konjuh

== Champions ==
=== Singles ===
- (Spain) Andrea Lázaro García def. (Ukraine) Anhelina Kalinina 3–6, 6–4, 6–3

=== Doubles ===
- (Czech Republic) Anastasia Dețiuc / (Czech Republic) Dominika Šalková def. (Czech Republic) Jesika Malečková / (Czech Republic) Miriam Škoch 7–5, 6–4
