= 2026 Open Angers Arena Loire =

- Date: 30 November – 6 December
- Edition: 6th
- Category: WTA 125
- Draw: 32S / 8D
- Prize money: $115,000
- Surface: Hard (indoor)
- Location: Angers, France
- Venue: Arena Loire

2025 Champions

Singles
- (Uzbekistan) Kamilla Rakhimova

Doubles
- (Germany) Tamara Korpatsch / (France) Jessika Ponchet
- Open Angers Arena Loire

The 2026 Open Angers Loire Trélazé is an upcoming professional women's tennis tournament to be played on indoor hard courts. It will be the 6th edition of the tournament and part of the 2026 WTA 125 tournaments, offering $115,000 in prize money. It will take place in Angers, France from 30 November to 6 December 2026.

== Singles main draw entrants ==
=== Seeds ===
Country	Player	Rank^{1}	Seed
GBR	Sonay Kartal	53	1
UZB	Polina Kudermetova	87	2
CHN	Zhang Shuai	98	3
ITA	Lisa Pigato	117	4
UKR	Veronika Podrez	120	5
CZE	Dominika Šalková	130	6
FRA	Elsa Jacquemot	131	7
BUL	Elizara Yaneva	134	8

- ^{1} Rankings as of 23 November 2026.

=== Other entrants ===
The following players received a wildcard into the singles main draw:

- (France) Loïs Boisson
- (France)
- (France)

The following player received entry using a protected ranking:

- (Georgia (country)) Mariam Bolkvadze

The following players received entry from the qualifying draw:

== Doubles entrants ==
=== Seeds ===
Country	Player	Country	Player	Rank^{1}	Seed
FRA	Estelle Cascino	ARG	Nicole Fossa Huergo	172	1
	Elena Pridankina	BEL	Lara Salden	180	2

- ^{1} Rankings as of 23 November 2026.
