= 2026 Dubrovnik Open – Singles =

Singles
- 2026 Dubrovnik Open

Final
- Champion: (Spain) Andrea Lázaro García
- Runner-up: (Ukraine) Anhelina Kalinina
- Score: 3–6, 6–4, 6–3

Details
- Draw: 32 (4Q / 3WC)
- Seeds: 8

Events
Singles	Doubles
- Dubrovnik Open

This was the first edition of the tournament.

Andrea Lázaro García won the title, defeating Anhelina Kalinina 3–6, 6–4, 6–3 in the final.

== Seeds ==
1. (Croatia) Petra Marčinko (first round)
2. (Slovenia) Veronika Erjavec (quarterfinals)
3. (Egypt) Mayar Sherif (semifinals)
4. (Germany) Tamara Korpatsch (second round)
5. Anastasia Pavlyuchenkova (first round, retired)
6. (Netherlands) Suzan Lamens (second round)
7. (Ukraine) Anhelina Kalinina (final)
8. (Poland) Maja Chwalińska (first round)

== Draw ==
Key

- Q = Qualifier
- WC = Wild card
- LL = Lucky loser
- Alt = Alternate
- ITF = ITF entry
- PR = Protected ranking
- SR = Special ranking
- SE = Special exempt
- JE = Junior exempt
- JR = Junior Accelerator Programme entrant
- CO = College Accelerator Programme entrant
- NG = Next Gen Accelerator Program entrant
- w/o = Walkover
- r = Retired
- d = Defaulted

=== Finals ===
Semifinals
(Spain) Andrea Lázaro García	6	7^{7}
3	(Egypt) Mayar Sherif	3	6^{4}
7	(Ukraine) Anhelina Kalinina	6	4	6
(Slovenia) Tamara Zidanšek	0	6	3

Final
(Spain) Andrea Lázaro García	3	6	6
7	(Ukraine) Anhelina Kalinina	6	4	3

=== Top half ===
First round
1	(Croatia) P Marčinko	2	3
(Serbia) T Kostović	6	6
(Serbia) L Radivojević	2	2
A Charaeva	6	6
Q	(Hungary) A Tóth	2	2
(Spain) A Lázaro García	6	6
WC	(Croatia) T Lukas	6^{5}	6	1
5	A Pavlyuchenkova	7^{7}	2	0^{r}
3	(Egypt) M Sherif	6	6
LL	(Germany) N Noha Akugue	4	4
WC	(Croatia) L Ćirić Bagarić	1	1
Q	(Serbia) M Ristić	6	6
(Spain) L Romero Gormaz	6	6
(North Macedonia) L Gjorcheska	3	3
WC	(Morocco) Y Kabbaj	3	6^{4}
6	(Netherlands) S Lamens	6	7^{7}

Second round
(Serbia) T Kostović	6	3	4
A Charaeva	3	6	6
(Spain) A Lázaro García	6	6
WC	(Croatia) T Lukas	3	1
3	(Egypt) M Sherif	6	6
Q	(Serbia) M Ristić	4	3
(Spain) L Romero Gormaz	6	7
6	(Netherlands) S Lamens	3	5

Quarterfinals
A Charaeva	1	1
(Spain) A Lázaro García	6	6
3	(Egypt) M Sherif	1	6	6
(Spain) L Romero Gormaz	6	4	2

Semifinals
(Spain) A Lázaro García	6	7^{7}
3	(Egypt) M Sherif	3	6^{4}

=== Bottom half ===
First round
7	(Ukraine) A Kalinina	7	0	6
(Italy) L Bronzetti	5	6	2
(Italy) N Brancaccio	6	7
(Italy) L Pigato	2	5
E Pridankina	3	2
Q	(Slovenia) P Hercog	6	6
WC	(Croatia) A Konjuh	1	3
4	(Germany) T Korpatsch	6	6
8	(Poland) M Chwalińska	3	1
(Slovenia) T Zidanšek	6	6
(France) T Rakotomanga Rajaonah	0	5
Q	(Spain) S Sorribes Tormo	6	7
(Czech Republic) D Šalková	1	6^{9}
(Spain) K Quevedo	6	7^{11}
(Spain) G Maristany	5	4
2	(Slovenia) V Erjavec	7	6

Second round
7	(Ukraine) A Kalinina	6	6
(Italy) N Brancaccio	0	2
Q	(Slovenia) P Hercog	6	5	7
4	(Germany) T Korpatsch	2	7	5
(Slovenia) T Zidanšek	6^{6}	6	6
Q	(Spain) S Sorribes Tormo	7^{8}	2	1
(Spain) K Quevedo	2	2
2	(Slovenia) V Erjavec	6	6

Quarterfinals
7	(Ukraine) A Kalinina	7^{7}	6
Q	(Slovenia) P Hercog	6^{4}	2
(Slovenia) T Zidanšek	7^{7}	6
2	(Slovenia) V Erjavec	6^{4}	3

Semifinals
7	(Ukraine) A Kalinina	6	4	6
(Slovenia) T Zidanšek	0	6	3

== Qualifying ==
=== Seeds ===
1. (Germany) Noma Noha Akugue (qualifying competition, lucky loser)
2. (Spain) Marina Bassols Ribera (first round)
3. (Burundi) Sada Nahimana (first round)
4. (Croatia) Tara Würth (qualifying competition)
5. (Italy) Tyra Caterina Grant (withdrew)
6. (Serbia) Mia Ristić (qualified)
7. (Slovenia) Polona Hercog (qualified)
8. (Hungary) Amarissa Tóth (qualified)

=== Qualifiers ===
1. (Serbia) Mia Ristić
2. (Slovenia) Polona Hercog
3. (Spain) Sara Sorribes Tormo
4. (Hungary) Amarissa Tóth

=== Lucky loser ===
1. (Germany) Noma Noha Akugue

=== Qualifying draw ===
==== First qualifier ====
First round
1	(Germany) Noma Noha Akugue	6	6
(China) Liu Min	2	3
(Poland) Katarzyna Piter	2	4
6	(Serbia) Mia Ristić	6	6

Qualifying competition
1	(Germany) Noma Noha Akugue	1	1
6	(Serbia) Mia Ristić	6	6

==== Second qualifier ====
First round
2	(Spain) Marina Bassols Ribera	6^{4}	4
(Germany) Jule Niemeier	7^{7}	6
(Slovenia) Nika Radišić	6	2	2
7	(Slovenia) Polona Hercog	2	6	6

Qualifying competition
(Germany) Jule Niemeier	0	1
7	(Slovenia) Polona Hercog	6	6

==== Third qualifier ====
First round				Qualifying competition
3	(Burundi) Sada Nahimana	5	4
WC	(Spain) Sara Sorribes Tormo	7	6
WC	(Spain) Sara Sorribes Tormo	7	6	WC	(Spain) Sara Sorribes Tormo	6	6
				WC	(Croatia) Ana Petković	0	0

==== Fourth qualifier ====
First round
4	(Croatia) Tara Würth	6	6
WC	(United Kingdom) Vlada Kozak	1	1
WC	(Czech Republic) Anastasia Dețiuc	0	3
8	(Hungary) Amarissa Tóth	6	6

Qualifying competition
4	(Croatia) Tara Würth	2	6	4
8	(Hungary) Amarissa Tóth	6	1	6
