= 2023 Axion Open – Doubles =

Doubles
- 2023 Axion Open

Final
- Champions: (United Kingdom) Emily Appleton (Germany) Julia Lohoff
- Runners-up: (Romania) Andreea Mitu (Argentina) Nadia Podoroska
- Score: 6–1, 6–2

Events
Singles	Doubles
← 2022 ·	Chiasso Open	· 2024 →

Anastasia Dețiuc and Miriam Kolodziejová were the defending champions but chose not to participate.

Emily Appleton and Julia Lohoff won the title, defeating Andreea Mitu and Nadia Podoroska in the final, 6–1, 6–2.

== Seeds ==
1. Irina Khromacheva / Anastasia Tikhonova (first round)
2. (United Kingdom) Emily Appleton / (Germany) Julia Lohoff (champions)
3. (Uzbekistan) Nigina Abduraimova / (France) Estelle Cascino (semifinals)
4. (Indonesia) Beatrice Gumulya / (Czech Republic) Anna Sisková (quarterfinals)

== Draw ==
=== Key ===
- Q = Qualifier
- WC = Wild card
- LL = Lucky loser
- Alt = Alternate
- SE = Special exempt
- PR = Protected ranking
- ITF = ITF entry
- JE = Junior exempt
- w/o = Walkover
- r = Retired
- d = Defaulted
- SR = Special ranking

First round
1	I Khromacheva; A Tikhonova	6^{4}	4
(Romania) A Mitu (Argentina) N Podoroska	7^{7}	6
(Japan) M Ayukawa (United Kingdom) E Webley-Smith	6	6
WC	(Italy) S De Stefano (Switzerland) L Selishta	2	0
3	(Uzbekistan) N Abduraimova (France) E Cascino	7	6
WC	(France) O Babel (Switzerland) S Scilipoti	5	2
(Switzerland) Y In-Albon (France) S Janicijevic	6	3	[6]
WC	(Switzerland) A Granwehr (Switzerland) K Kozakova	2	6	[10]
(Switzerland) X Knoll (Switzerland) C Naef	3	6	[10]
(Switzerland) J Dürst (France) C Monnet	6	4	[5]
(Philippines) A Eala (Czech Republic) B Palicová	3	6	[11]
4	(Indonesia) B Gumulya (Czech Republic) A Sisková	6	4	[13]
(Romania) IG Ghioroaie (Slovenia) N Radišić	6	6
(Romania) O Gavrilă (Latvia) D Semeņistaja	3	3
(Czech Republic) M Bayerlová (Switzerland) C Perrin	6	6^{5}	[4]
2	(United Kingdom) E Appleton (Germany) J Lohoff	3	7^{7}	[10]

Quarterfinals
(Romania) A Mitu (Argentina) N Podoroska	6	6
(Japan) M Ayukawa (United Kingdom) E Webley-Smith	2	3
3	(Uzbekistan) N Abduraimova (France) E Cascino	7	6
WC	(Switzerland) A Granwehr (Switzerland) K Kozakova	5	3
(Switzerland) X Knoll (Switzerland) C Naef	6	6
4	(Indonesia) B Gumulya (Czech Republic) A Sisková	2	1
(Romania) IG Ghioroaie (Slovenia) N Radišić	6^{3}	6^{4}
2	(United Kingdom) E Appleton (Germany) J Lohoff	7^{7}	7^{7}

Semifinals
(Romania) A Mitu (Argentina) N Podoroska	6	6
3	(Uzbekistan) N Abduraimova (France) E Cascino	3	2
(Switzerland) X Knoll (Switzerland) C Naef	3	2
2	(United Kingdom) E Appleton (Germany) J Lohoff	6	6

Final
(Romania) A Mitu (Argentina) N Podoroska	1	2
2	(United Kingdom) E Appleton (Germany) J Lohoff	6	6
