= 2023 Axion Open =

Tennis tournament

- Date: 10–16 April 2023
- Edition: 11th
- Category: ITF Women's World Tennis Tour
- Prize money: $60,000
- Surface: Clay / Outdoor
- Location: Chiasso, Switzerland

Champions

Singles
- Mirra Andreeva

Doubles
- (United Kingdom) Emily Appleton / (Germany) Julia Lohoff
← 2022 ·	Chiasso Open	· 2024 →

The 2023 Axion Open was a professional tennis tournament played on outdoor clay courts. It was the eleventh edition of the tournament, which was part of the 2023 ITF Women's World Tennis Tour. It took place in Chiasso, Switzerland, between 10 and 16 April 2023.

== Champions ==
=== Singles ===
- Mirra Andreeva def. (Switzerland) Céline Naef, 1–6, 7–6^{(7–3)}, 6–0

=== Doubles ===
- (United Kingdom) Emily Appleton / (Germany) Julia Lohoff def. (Romania) Andreea Mitu / (Argentina) Nadia Podoroska, 6–1, 6–2

== Singles main draw entrants ==
=== Seeds ===
Country	Player	Rank	Seed
ARG	Nadia Podoroska	103	1
SUI	Simona Waltert	121	2
SUI	Ylena In-Albon	137	3
GBR	Katie Swan	149	4
	Elina Avanesyan	150	5
CYP	Raluca Șerban	155	6
ROU	Elena-Gabriela Ruse	159	7
UZB	Nigina Abduraimova	180	8

- Rankings are as of 3 April 2023.

=== Other entrants ===
The following players received wildcards into the singles main draw:

- (Switzerland) Jenny Dürst
- (Switzerland) Céline Naef
- (Switzerland) Sebastianna Scilipoti
- (Ukraine) Elina Svitolina

The following players received entry from the qualifying draw:

- Mirra Andreeva
- (France) Tessah Andrianjafitrimo
- (Czech Republic) Michaela Bayerlová
- (France) Fiona Ferro
- (Croatia) Jana Fett
- (Germany) Lena Papadakis
- (Switzerland) Conny Perrin
- (France) Alice Tubello
