= 2022 Axion Open – Singles =

Singles
- 2022 Axion Open

Final
- Champion: (Italy) Lucia Bronzetti
- Runner-up: (Switzerland) Simona Waltert
- Score: 2–6, 6–3, 6–3

Events
| Singles | Doubles |
| ← 2019 · | Chiasso Open | · 2023 → |

Varvara Gracheva was the defending champion but chose not to participate.

Lucia Bronzetti won the title, defeating Simona Waltert in the final, 2–6, 6–3, 6–3.

== Seeds ==
1. (Italy) Lucia Bronzetti (champion)
2. (Romania) Mihaela Buzărnescu (first round)
3. (Spain) Rebeka Masarova (first round)
4. Anna Blinkova (first round)
5. (Slovenia) Polona Hercog (first round)
6. (Hungary) Réka Luca Jani (quarterfinals)
7. (Switzerland) Ylena In-Albon (first round)
8. (Netherlands) Arianne Hartono (first round)

== Draw ==
=== Key ===
- Q = Qualifier
- WC = Wild card
- LL = Lucky loser
- Alt = Alternate
- SE = Special exempt
- PR = Protected ranking
- ITF = ITF entry
- JE = Junior exempt
- w/o = Walkover
- r = Retired
- d = Defaulted
- SR = Special ranking

=== Finals ===
Semifinals
1 | (Italy) Lucia Bronzetti | 6 | 6
Q | Natalia Vikhlyantseva | 3 | 2
(Switzerland) Simona Waltert | 6 | 6
SE | (Cyprus) Raluca Șerban | 3 | 2

Final
1 | (Italy) Lucia Bronzetti | 2 | 6 | 6
(Switzerland) Simona Waltert | 6 | 3 | 3

=== Top half ===
First round
1 | (Italy) L Bronzetti | 6 | 6
Q | (Slovenia) D Jakupović | 3 | 3
O Selekhmeteva | 6 | 6
Q | (Czech Republic) A Sisková | 3 | 4
(Switzerland) C Perrin | 6 | 3 | 2
SE | (Italy) M Di Giuseppe | 4 | 6 | 6
(Switzerland) S Bandecchi | 4 | 6 | 6
8 | (Netherlands) A Hartono | 6 | 2 | 2
3 | (Spain) R Masarova | 5 | 4
Q | N Vikhlyantseva | 7 | 6
Q | (Czech Republic) M Kolodziejová | 6 | 7^{8}
Q | (Switzerland) J Dürst | 4 | 6^{6}
(Germany) A-L Friedsam | 6 | 3 | 1
WC | (Switzerland) S Scilipoti | 0 | 6 | 6
Q | (Spain) I Burillo Escorihuela | 3 | 6 | 6
5 | (Slovenia) P Hercog | 6 | 4 | 3

Second round
1 | (Italy) L Bronzetti | 7 | 6
O Selekhmeteva | 5 | 3
SE | (Italy) M Di Giuseppe | 4 | 6 | 7
(Switzerland) S Bandecchi | 6 | 3 | 5
Q | N Vikhlyantseva | 6 | 4 | 6
Q | (Czech Republic) M Kolodziejová | 2 | 6 | 4
WC | (Switzerland) S Scilipoti | 3 | 6 | 7^{7}
Q | (Spain) I Burillo Escorihuela | 6 | 2 | 6^{3}

Quarterfinals
1 | (Italy) L Bronzetti | 7^{9} | 7^{7}
SE | (Italy) M Di Giuseppe | 6^{7} | 6^{4}
Q | N Vikhlyantseva | 6 | 7
WC | (Switzerland) S Scilipoti | 0 | 5

Semifinals
1 | (Italy) L Bronzetti | 6 | 6
Q | N Vikhlyantseva | 3 | 2

=== Bottom half ===
First round
6 | (Hungary) RL Jani | 2 | 6 | 6
WC | (Switzerland) L Küng | 6 | 0 | 1
(Germany) K Gerlach | 6^{3} | 6 | 3
Q | E Andreeva | 7^{7} | 3 | 6
(Italy) G Gatto-Monticone | 1 | 6^{3}
Q | (France) E Jacquemot | 6 | 7^{7}
(Switzerland) S Waltert | 7^{7} | 6
4 | A Blinkova | 6^{1} | 1
7 | (Switzerland) Y In-Albon | 3 | 7^{7} | 4
(Japan) Y Naito | 6 | 6^{5} | 6
WC | (Switzerland) A Granwehr | 3 | 1
WC | (Switzerland) C Naef | 6 | 6
(Spain) A Bolsova | 4 | 6 | 7
(Switzerland) J Züger | 6 | 2 | 5
SE | (Cyprus) R Șerban | 3 | 6 | 6
2 | (Romania) M Buzărnescu | 6 | 0 | 3

Second round
6 | (Hungary) RL Jani | 6 | 6
Q | E Andreeva | 2 | 1
Q | (France) E Jacquemot | 3 | 6 | 6^{4}
(Switzerland) S Waltert | 6 | 4 | 7^{7}
(Japan) Y Naito | 6 | 6
WC | (Switzerland) C Naef | 1 | 2
(Spain) A Bolsova | 2 | 2
SE | (Cyprus) R Șerban | 6 | 6

Quarterfinals
6 | (Hungary) RL Jani | 2 | 6^{5}
(Switzerland) S Waltert | 6 | 7^{7}
(Japan) Y Naito | 3^{r}
SE | (Cyprus) R Șerban | 2

Semifinals
(Switzerland) S Waltert | 6 | 6
SE | (Cyprus) R Șerban | 3 | 2
