= 2024 Axion Open =

Tennis tournament

- Date: 15–21 April 2024
- Edition: 12th
- Category: ITF Women's World Tennis Tour
- Prize money: $60,000
- Surface: Clay / Outdoor
- Location: Chiasso, Switzerland

Champions

Singles
- (Argentina) Julia Riera

Doubles
- (United Kingdom) Emily Appleton / (Germany) Lena Papadakis
← 2023 ·	Chiasso Open	· 2025 →

The 2024 Axion Open was a professional tennis tournament played on outdoor clay courts. It was the twelfth edition of the tournament, which was part of the 2024 ITF Women's World Tennis Tour. It took place in Chiasso, Switzerland, between 15 and 21 April 2024.

== Champions ==
=== Singles ===
- (Argentina) Julia Riera def. (Hungary) Anna Bondár, 6–3, 7–6^{(7–2)}

=== Doubles ===
- (United Kingdom) Emily Appleton / (Germany) Lena Papadakis def. (Greece) Despina Papamichail / (Switzerland) Simona Waltert, 4–6, 6–4, [10–6]

== Singles main draw entrants ==
=== Seeds ===
Country	Player	Rank	Seed
USA	Kayla Day	86	1
LAT	Darja Semeņistaja	110	2
ARG	Julia Riera	112	3
HUN	Anna Bondár	114	4
SUI	Simona Waltert	158	5
ARG	Martina Capurro Taborda	168	6
EST	Kaia Kanepi	225	7
CZE	Nikola Bartůňková	226	8

- Rankings are as of 8 April 2024.

=== Other entrants ===
The following players received wildcards into the singles main draw:

- (Switzerland) Susan Bandecchi
- (Switzerland) Alina Granwehr
- (Switzerland) Karolina Kozakova
- (Switzerland) Sebastianna Scilipoti

The following players received entry from the qualifying draw:

- (United Kingdom) Emily Appleton
- (Italy) Martina Colmegna
- (Spain) Lucía Cortez Llorca
- (Germany) Anna Gabric
- (Switzerland) Fiona Ganz
- Marina Melnikova
- (Romania) Maria Sara Popa
- (Switzerland) Katerina Tsygourova
