= Dubrovnik Open =

- 2026 Dubrovnik Open

WTA 125
- Event name: Dubrovnik Open
- Location: Dubrovnik, Croatia
- Venue: Tennis Club Dubrovnik
- Category: WTA 125
- Surface: Clay
- Draw: 32S/15Q/8D
- Prize money: $115,000
- Website: dubrovnikopen.com

Current champions (2026)
- Singles: (Spain) Andrea Lázaro García
- Doubles: (Czech Republic) Anastasia Dețiuc (Czech Republic) Dominika Šalková

The Dubrovnik Open is a tournament for professional female tennis players played on outdoor clay courts. The event is classified as a WTA 125 tournament and is held at the Tennis Club Dubrovnik in Dubrovnik, Croatia.

== Past finals ==
=== Singles ===
Year	Champion	Runners-up	Score
2026	(Spain) Andrea Lázaro García	(Ukraine) Anhelina Kalinina	3–6, 6–4, 6–3

=== Doubles ===
Year	Champions	Runners-up	Score
2026	(Czech Republic) Anastasia Dețiuc (Czech Republic) Dominika Šalková	(Czech Republic) Jesika Malečková (Czech Republic) Miriam Škoch	7–5, 6–4
