= 2024 Axion Open – Singles =

Singles
- 2024 Axion Open

Final
- Champion: (Argentina) Julia Riera
- Runner-up: (Hungary) Anna Bondár
- Score: 6–3, 7–6^{(7–2)}

Events
Singles	Doubles
← 2023 ·	Chiasso Open	· 2025 →

Mirra Andreeva was the defending champion but chose not to participate.

Julia Riera won the title after defeating Anna Bondár in the final, 6–3, 7–6^{(7–2)}.

== Seeds ==
1. (United States) Kayla Day (quarterfinals)
2. (Latvia) Darja Semeņistaja (second round)
3. (Argentina) Julia Riera (champion)
4. (Hungary) Anna Bondár (final)
5. (Switzerland) Simona Waltert (quarterfinals)
6. (Argentina) Martina Capurro Taborda (second round)
7. (Estonia) Kaia Kanepi (first round)
8. (Czech Republic) Nikola Bartůňková (first round)

== Draw ==
=== Key ===
- Q = Qualifier
- WC = Wild card
- LL = Lucky loser
- Alt = Alternate
- SE = Special exempt
- PR = Protected ranking
- ITF = ITF entry
- JE = Junior exempt
- w/o = Walkover
- r = Retired
- d = Defaulted
- SR = Special ranking

=== Finals ===
Semifinals
(Turkey) Berfu Cengiz	6	1	2
3	(Argentina) Julia Riera	4	6	6
4	(Hungary) Anna Bondár	7	6
(France) Loïs Boisson	5	4

Final
3	(Argentina) Julia Riera	6	7^{7}
4	(Hungary) Anna Bondár	3	6^{2}

=== Top half ===
First round
1	(United States) K Day	6	1	6
Q	(Germany) A Gabric	4	6	1
(Slovenia) N Radišić	1	1
WC	(Switzerland) S Bandecchi	6	6
(Turkey) B Cengiz	7	6
Q	(United Kingdom) E Appleton	5	2
WC	(Switzerland) K Kozakova	5	2
6	(Argentina) M Capurro Taborda	7	6
3	(Argentina) J Riera	3	6	6
(Czech Republic) B Palicová	6	3	4
Q	(Italy) M Colmegna	7^{9}	6
WC	(Switzerland) S Scilipoti	6^{7}	4
WC	(Switzerland) A Granwehr	4	6	3
Q	(Spain) L Cortez Llorca	6	4	6
(Latvia) D Vismane	3	0
5	(Switzerland) S Waltert	6	6

Second round
1	(United States) K Day	7^{7}	5	7
WC	(Switzerland) S Bandecchi	6^{5}	7	5
(Turkey) B Cengiz	6	6
6	(Argentina) M Capurro Taborda	0	2
3	(Argentina) J Riera	5	6	6
Q	(Italy) M Colmegna	7	4	4
Q	(Spain) L Cortez Llorca	4	3
5	(Switzerland) S Waltert	6	6

Quarterfinals
1	(United States) K Day	6	4	3
(Turkey) B Cengiz	2	6	6
3	(Argentina) J Riera	6	6
5	(Switzerland) S Waltert	2	4

Semifinals
(Turkey) B Cengiz	6	1	2
3	(Argentina) J Riera	4	6	6

=== Bottom half ===
First round
8	(Czech Republic) N Bartůňková	3	4
(Malta) F Curmi	6	6
(Italy) L Pigato	5	6	6
(Australia) TN Smith	7	4	0
(Greece) D Papamichail	7	5	6^{3}
Q	(Romania) MS Popa	5	7	7^{7}
Q	(Switzerland) K Tsygourova	3	0
4	(Hungary) A Bondár	6	6
7	(Estonia) K Kanepi	0	3
(Spain) I Burillo Escorihuela	6	6
(Latvia) D Marcinkēviča	6	4	4
(Switzerland) L Küng	2	6	6
(France) L Boisson	6	6
Q	(Switzerland) F Ganz	1	4
Q	M Melnikova	2	5
2	(Latvia) D Semeņistaja	6	7

Second round
(Malta) F Curmi	2	6	7^{7}
(Italy) L Pigato	6	2	6^{5}
Q	(Romania) MS Popa	3	4
4	(Hungary) A Bondár	6	6
(Spain) I Burillo Escorihuela	7^{7}	6
(Switzerland) L Küng	6^{2}	3
(France) L Boisson	7	6
2	(Latvia) D Semeņistaja	5	1

Quarterfinals
(Malta) F Curmi	4	6^{5}
4	(Hungary) A Bondár	6	7^{7}
(Spain) I Burillo Escorihuela	1	3
(France) L Boisson	6	6

Semifinals
4	(Hungary) A Bondár	7	6
(France) L Boisson	5	4
