= 2024 Axion Open – Doubles =

Doubles
- 2024 Axion Open

Final
- Champions: (United Kingdom) Emily Appleton (Germany) Lena Papadakis
- Runners-up: (Greece) Despina Papamichail (Switzerland) Simona Waltert
- Score: 4–6, 6–4, [10–6]

Events
Singles	Doubles
← 2023 ·	Chiasso Open	· 2025 →

Emily Appleton and Julia Lohoff were the defending champions but Lohoff chose not to participate.

Appleton partnered alongside Lena Papadakis and successfully defended her title, defeating Despina Papamichail and Simona Waltert in the final, 4–6, 6–4, [10–6].

== Seeds ==
1. (Latvia) Darja Semeņistaja / (Latvia) Daniela Vismane (quarterfinals)
2. (United Kingdom) Emily Appleton / (Germany) Lena Papadakis (champions)
3. (Slovenia) Nika Radišić / (Bosnia and Herzegovina) Anita Wagner (semifinals, retired)
4. (Italy) Martina Colmegna / (Italy) Lisa Pigato (semifinals)

== Draw ==
Key

- Q = Qualifier
- WC = Wild card
- LL = Lucky loser
- Alt = Alternate
- ITF = ITF entry
- PR = Protected ranking
- SR = Special ranking
- SE = Special exempt
- JE = Junior exempt
- JR = Junior Accelerator Programme entrant
- CO = College Accelerator Programme entrant
- NG = Next Gen Accelerator Program entrant
- w/o = Walkover
- r = Retired
- d = Defaulted

First round
(Greece) D Papamichail (Switzerland) S Waltert	6	6
(Italy) J Bertoldo (Italy) V Meliss	3	0
(Germany) A Gabric (Germany) M Vogt	7	6
(Argentina) M Capurro Taborda (Argentina) J Riera	5	4
(Switzerland) K Kozakova (Australia) TN Smith	6	6
(Switzerland) Z Kägi (Switzerland) C Talleri	0	3
(Switzerland) A Granwehr (Switzerland) K Tsygourova	4	2
(Switzerland) N Karamoko (Latvia) D Marcinkēviča	6	6

Quarterfinals
1	(Latvia) D Semeņistaja (Latvia) D Vismane	5	5
(Greece) D Papamichail (Switzerland) S Waltert	7	7
3	(Slovenia) N Radišić (Bosnia and Herzegovina) A Wagner	6	4	[16]
(Germany) A Gabric (Germany) M Vogt	3	6	[14]
(Switzerland) K Kozakova (Australia) TN Smith	4	6	[7]
4	(Italy) M Colmegna (Italy) L Pigato	6	3	[10]
(Switzerland) N Karamoko (Latvia) D Marcinkēviča	0	2
2	(United Kingdom) E Appleton (Germany) L Papadakis	6	6

Semifinals
(Greece) D Papamichail (Switzerland) S Waltert	7^{8}	4
3	(Slovenia) N Radišić (Bosnia and Herzegovina) A Wagner	6^{6}	2^{r}
4	(Italy) M Colmegna (Italy) L Pigato	4	3
2	(United Kingdom) E Appleton (Germany) L Papadakis	6	6

Final
(Greece) D Papamichail (Switzerland) S Waltert	6	4	[6]
2	(United Kingdom) E Appleton (Germany) L Papadakis	4	6	[10]
