= 2022 Axion Open – Doubles =

Doubles
- 2022 Axion Open

Final
- Champions: (Czech Republic) Anastasia Dețiuc (Czech Republic) Miriam Kolodziejová
- Runners-up: (Spain) Aliona Bolsova; Oksana Selekhmeteva
- Score: 6–3, 1–6, [10–8]

Events
Singles	Doubles
← 2019 ·	Chiasso Open	· 2023 →

Cristina Bucșa and Marta Kostyuk were the defending champions but chose not to participate.

Anastasia Dețiuc and Miriam Kolodziejová won the title, defeating Aliona Bolsova and Oksana Selekhmeteva in the final, 6–3, 1–6, [10–8].

== Seeds ==
1. (Spain) Aliona Bolsova / Oksana Selekhmeteva (final)
2. (Indonesia) Beatrice Gumulya / (Netherlands) Arianne Hartono (first round)
3. (Switzerland) Susan Bandecchi / (Switzerland) Simona Waltert (first round)
4. (Switzerland) Xenia Knoll / (Lithuania) Justina Mikulskytė (first round)

== Draw ==
=== Key ===
- Q = Qualifier
- WC = Wild card
- LL = Lucky loser
- Alt = Alternate
- SE = Special exempt
- PR = Protected ranking
- ITF = ITF entry
- JE = Junior exempt
- w/o = Walkover
- r = Retired
- d = Defaulted
- SR = Special ranking

=== Draw ===
First round
1	(Spain) A Bolsova; O Selekhmeteva	6	6
(Italy) M Di Giuseppe (Italy) G Gatto-Monticone	4	1
(United Kingdom) E Appleton (United Kingdom) A Collins	6	6
(Japan) Y Naito (India) A Raina	2	2
3	(Switzerland) S Bandecchi (Switzerland) S Waltert	6^{2}	6	[7]
(Germany) T Morderger (Germany) Y Morderger	7^{7}	2	[10]
(United States) A Lahey (Slovenia) N Radišić	4	5
(Switzerland) A Granwehr (Switzerland) C Naef	6	7
(Switzerland) L Küng (United Kingdom) E Webley-Smith	6^{5}	6	[5]
(Switzerland) C Perrin (India) P Thombare	7^{7}	4	[10]
(Italy) S De Stefano (Switzerland) L Selishta	6	1	[12]
4	(Switzerland) X Knoll (Lithuania) J Mikulskytė	4	6	[10]
(Czech Republic) A Dețiuc (Czech Republic) M Kolodziejová	6	6
(Switzerland) Y In-Albon (France) E Jacquemot	2	1
(Switzerland) J Dürst (Switzerland) J Züger	7^{7}	6
2	(Indonesia) B Gumulya (Netherlands) A Hartono	6^{3}	2

Quarterfinals
1	(Spain) A Bolsova; O Selekhmeteva	7^{7}	4	[10]
(United Kingdom) E Appleton (United Kingdom) A Collins	6^{5}	6	[4]
(Germany) T Morderger (Germany) Y Morderger	6	6
(Switzerland) A Granwehr (Switzerland) C Naef	3	2
(Switzerland) C Perrin (India) P Thombare	6	6
(Italy) S De Stefano (Switzerland) L Selishta	0	2
(Czech Republic) A Dețiuc (Czech Republic) M Kolodziejová	6	7^{9}
(Switzerland) J Dürst (Switzerland) J Züger	2	6^{7}

Semifinals
1	(Spain) A Bolsova; O Selekhmeteva	6	6
(Germany) T Morderger (Germany) Y Morderger	3	2
(Switzerland) C Perrin (India) P Thombare	6	4	[5]
(Czech Republic) A Dețiuc (Czech Republic) M Kolodziejová	1	6	[10]

Final
1	(Spain) A Bolsova; O Selekhmeteva	3	6	[8]
(Czech Republic) A Dețiuc (Czech Republic) M Kolodziejová	6	1	[10]
