= 2025 Open Angers Arena Loire – Doubles =

Doubles
- 2025 Open Angers Arena Loire

Final
- Champions: (Germany) Tamara Korpatsch (France) Jessika Ponchet
- Runners-up: (Czech Republic) Jesika Malečková (Czech Republic) Miriam Škoch
- Score: 6–3, 6–2

Events
Singles	Doubles
← 2024 ·	Open Angers Arena Loire	· 2026 →

Tamara Korpatsch and Jessika Ponchet won the title, defeating Jesika Malečková and Miriam Škoch in the final, 6–3, 6–2.

Monica Niculescu and Elena-Gabriela Ruse were the defending champions, but chose not to compete.

== Seeds ==
1. (Belgium) Magali Kempen / (Czech Republic) Anna Sisková (semifinals)
2. (Czech Republic) Jesika Malečková / (Czech Republic) Miriam Škoch (final)

== Draw ==
Key

- Q = Qualifier
- WC = Wild card
- LL = Lucky loser
- Alt = Alternate
- ITF = ITF entry
- PR = Protected ranking
- SR = Special ranking
- SE = Special exempt
- JE = Junior exempt
- JR = Junior Accelerator Programme entrant
- CO = College Accelerator Programme entrant
- NG = Next Gen Accelerator Program entrant
- w/o = Walkover
- r = Retired
- d = Defaulted

=== Draw ===
Quarterfinals
(Croatia) A Ružić (Czech Republic) D Šalková	6^{2}	1
(Netherlands) I Haverlag (United Kingdom) M Lumsden	7^{7}	6
(United Kingdom) A Barnett (Germany) A-L Friedsam	3	2
2	(Czech Republic) J Malečková (Czech Republic) M Škoch	6	6

Semifinals
1	(Belgium) M Kempen (Czech Republic) A Sisková	4	6	[6]
(Germany) T Korpatsch (France) J Ponchet	6	3	[10]
(Netherlands) I Haverlag (United Kingdom) M Lumsden	6	3	[3]
2	(Czech Republic) J Malečková (Czech Republic) M Škoch	2	6	[10]

Final
(Germany) T Korpatsch (France) J Ponchet	6	6
2	(Czech Republic) J Malečková (Czech Republic) M Škoch	3	2
