= 2023 Axion Open – Singles =

Singles
- 2023 Axion Open

Final
- Champion: Mirra Andreeva
- Runner-up: (Switzerland) Céline Naef
- Score: 1–6, 7–6^{(7–3)}, 6–0

Events
Singles	Doubles
← 2022 ·	Chiasso Open	· 2024 →

Mirra Andreeva won the title, defeating Céline Naef in the final, 1–6, 7–6^{(7–3)}, 6–0, saving three championship points en route to the title.

Lucia Bronzetti was the defending champion, but chose not to participate.

== Seeds ==
1. (Argentina) Nadia Podoroska (semifinals)
2. (Switzerland) Simona Waltert (first round)
3. (Switzerland) Ylena In-Albon (first round)
4. (United Kingdom) Katie Swan (first round)
5. Elina Avanesyan (quarterfinals)
6. (Cyprus) Raluca Șerban (second round)
7. (Romania) Elena-Gabriela Ruse (first round)
8. (Uzbekistan) Nigina Abduraimova (second round)

== Draw ==
=== Key ===
- Q = Qualifier
- WC = Wild card
- LL = Lucky loser
- Alt = Alternate
- SE = Special exempt
- PR = Protected ranking
- ITF = ITF entry
- JE = Junior exempt
- w/o = Walkover
- r = Retired
- d = Defaulted
- SR = Special ranking

=== Finals ===
Semifinals
1	(Argentina) Nadia Podoroska	4	0
Q	Mirra Andreeva	6	6
(France) Séléna Janicijevic	5	1
WC	(Switzerland) Céline Naef	7	6

Final
Q	Mirra Andreeva	1	7^{7}	6
WC	(Switzerland) Céline Naef	6	6^{3}	0

=== Top half ===
First round
1	(Argentina) N Podoroska	7^{7}	5	6
Q	(France) T Andrianjafitrimo	6^{4}	7	2
Q	(Switzerland) C Perrin	6	3	6^{6}
A Tikhonova	4	6	7^{8}
WC	(Switzerland) S Scilipoti	1	0
Q	(Croatia) J Fett	6	6
Q	(Czech Republic) M Bayerlová	3	1
5	E Avanesyan	6	6
4	(United Kingdom) K Swan	6^{3}	4
(Czech Republic) B Palicová	7^{7}	6
WC	(Switzerland) J Dürst	3	2
Q	M Andreeva	6	6
(Philippines) A Eala	0	2
(Romania) A Cadanțu-Ignatik	6	6
WC	(Ukraine) E Svitolina	6	6
7	(Romania) E-G Ruse	4	2

Second round
1	(Argentina) N Podoroska	6	2	6
A Tikhonova	4	6	3
Q	(Croatia) J Fett	5	3
5	E Avanesyan	7	6
(Czech Republic) B Palicová	0	2
Q	M Andreeva	6	6
(Romania) A Cadanțu-Ignatik	1	6	7
WC	(Ukraine) E Svitolina	6	2	5

Quarterfinals
1	(Argentina) N Podoroska	7^{7}	7
5	E Avanesyan	6^{2}	5
Q	M Andreeva	6	6
(Romania) A Cadanțu-Ignatik	0	3

Semifinals
1	(Argentina) N Podoroska	4	0
Q	M Andreeva	6	6

=== Bottom half ===
First round
6	(Cyprus) R Șerban	6	6
Q	(Germany) L Papadakis	1	3
(Belgium) M Benoît	2	5
(France) S Janicijevic	6	7
(France) C Monnet	6	6^{12}	6
(France) A Albié	3	7^{14}	2
(Croatia) T Lukas	6	6
3	(Switzerland) Y In-Albon	2	0
8	(Uzbekistan) N Abduraimova	6	6
(Germany) M Barthel	3	4
Q	(France) A Tubello	5	4
(Latvia) D Semeņistaja	7	6
Q	(France) F Ferro	6	3	6
(Slovenia) D Jakupović	4	6	4
WC	(Switzerland) C Naef	6	7
2	(Switzerland) S Waltert	3	5

Second round
6	(Cyprus) R Șerban	2	6^{1}
(France) S Janicijevic	6	7^{7}
(France) C Monnet	4	3
(Croatia) T Lukas	6	6
8	(Uzbekistan) N Abduraimova	4	7	4
(Latvia) D Semeņistaja	6	5	6
Q	(France) F Ferro	6	3	3
WC	(Switzerland) C Naef	1	6	6

Quarterfinals
(France) S Janicijevic	3	7^{7}	6
(Croatia) T Lukas	6	6^{2}	2
(Latvia) D Semeņistaja	6^{4}	3
WC	(Switzerland) C Naef	7^{7}	6

Semifinals
(France) S Janicijevic	5	1
WC	(Switzerland) C Naef	7	6
