= 2026 Dubrovnik Open – Doubles =

Doubles
- 2026 Dubrovnik Open

Final
- Champion: (Czech Republic) Anastasia Dețiuc (Czech Republic) Dominika Šalková
- Runner-up: (Czech Republic) Jesika Malečková (Czech Republic) Miriam Škoch
- Score: 7–5, 6–4

Events
Singles	Doubles
- Dubrovnik Open

This was the first edition of the tournament.

Anastasia Dețiuc and Dominika Šalková won the title, defeating Jesika Malečková and Miriam Škoch 7–5, 6–4 in the final.

== Seeds ==
1. (Czech Republic) Jesika Malečková / (Czech Republic) Miriam Škoch (final)
2. (Belgium) Magali Kempen / Elena Pridankina (quarterfinals)

== Draw ==
Key

- Q = Qualifier
- WC = Wild card
- LL = Lucky loser
- Alt = Alternate
- ITF = ITF entry
- PR = Protected ranking
- SR = Special ranking
- SE = Special exempt
- JE = Junior exempt
- JR = Junior Accelerator Programme entrant
- CO = College Accelerator Programme entrant
- NG = Next Gen Accelerator Program entrant
- w/o = Walkover
- r = Retired
- d = Defaulted

=== Draw ===
Quarterfinals
1	(Czech Republic) J Malečková (Czech Republic) M Škoch	6	6
(Poland) K Piter (Egypt) M Sherif	3	2
(Spain) K Quevedo (Spain) S Sorribes Tormo	7^{7}	6
(Slovenia) V Erjavec (Slovenia) N Radišić	6^{2}	4
(Japan) M Kobori (Thailand) P Plipuech	6	4	[7]
WC	(Croatia) L Ćirić Bagarić (Croatia) A Konjuh	2	6	[10]
(Czech Republic) A Dețiuc (Czech Republic) D Šalková	0	6	[10]
2	(Belgium) M Kempen; E Pridankina	6	3	[7]

Semifinals
1	(Czech Republic) J Malečková (Czech Republic) M Škoch	6	6
(Spain) K Quevedo (Spain) S Sorribes Tormo	3	2
WC	(Croatia) L Ćirić Bagarić (Croatia) A Konjuh	3	1
(Czech Republic) A Dețiuc (Czech Republic) D Šalková	6	6

Final
1	(Czech Republic) J Malečková (Czech Republic) M Škoch	5	4
(Czech Republic) A Dețiuc (Czech Republic) D Šalková	7	6
