= 2025 Open Angers Arena Loire – Singles =

Singles
- 2025 Open Angers Arena Loire

Final
- Champion: (Uzbekistan) Kamilla Rakhimova
- Runner-up: (Germany) Tamara Korpatsch
- Score: 6–3, 7–6^{(7–4)}

Details
- Draw: 32 (4 Q / 4 WC)
- Seeds: 8

Events
Singles	Doubles
- Open Angers Arena Loire

Kamilla Rakhimova won the title at the 2025 Open Angers Arena Loire, defeating Tamara Korpatsch in the final; 6–3, 7–6^{(7–4)}. It was her second WTA 125 title.

Alycia Parks was the defending champion but lost in the quarterfinals to Korpatsch.

== Seeds ==
1. (United States) Alycia Parks (quarterfinals)
2. (Croatia) Antonia Ružić (semifinals)
3. Polina Kudermetova (second round)
4. (Latvia) Darja Semeņistaja (withdrew)
5. (Romania) Elena-Gabriela Ruse (withdrew)
6. (China) Zhang Shuai (second round)
7. (Italy) Lucia Bronzetti (first round)
8. (Andorra) Victoria Jiménez Kasintseva (first round)
9. (Uzbekistan) Kamilla Rakhimova (champion)

== Draw ==
Key

- Q = Qualifier
- WC = Wild card
- LL = Lucky loser
- Alt = Alternate
- ITF = ITF entry
- PR = Protected ranking
- SR = Special ranking
- SE = Special exempt
- JE = Junior exempt
- JR = Junior Accelerator Programme entrant
- CO = College Accelerator Programme entrant
- NG = Next Gen Accelerator Program entrant
- w/o = Walkover
- r = Retired
- d = Defaulted

=== Finals ===
Semifinals
(Germany) Tamara Korpatsch	6	6
(Germany) Anna-Lena Friedsam	3	4
9	(Uzbekistan) Kamilla Rakhimova	4	6	7
2	(Croatia) Antonia Ružić	6	3	5

Final
(Germany) Tamara Korpatsch	3	6^{4}
9	(Uzbekistan) Kamilla Rakhimova	6	7^{7}

=== Top half ===
First round
1	(United States) A Parks	6	6
(Czech Republic) G Knutson	3	1
PR	(France) O Dodin	6	6
(France) A Ramé	3	4
Q	(Australia) T Smith	6	4	0
WC	(France) F Ferro	3	6	6
(Germany) T Korpatsch	6	6
LL	(Czech Republic) A Sisková	4	4
3	P Kudermetova	6	6
(Italy) C Rosatello	2	2
(Serbia) T Kostović	3	6^{7}
(Germany) A-L Friedsam	6	7^{9}
Q	(United Kingdom) L Miyazaki	2	3
LL	(France) A Monnot	6	6
(Turkey) Z Sönmez	3	7^{7}	6
8	(Andorra) V Jiménez Kasintseva	6	6^{5}	3

Second round
1	(United States) A Parks	7^{7}	5	6
PR	(France) O Dodin	6^{3}	7	3
WC	(France) F Ferro	2	3
(Germany) T Korpatsch	6	6
3	P Kudermetova	3	6	2
(Germany) A-L Friedsam	6	1	6
LL	(France) A Monnot	6	1	1
(Turkey) Z Sönmez	3	6	6

Quarterfinals
1	(United States) A Parks	3	3
(Germany) T Korpatsch	6	6
(Germany) A-L Friedsam	5	6	6
(Turkey) Z Sönmez	7	3	4

Semifinals
(Germany) T Korpatsch	6	6
(Germany) A-L Friedsam	3	4

=== Bottom half ===
First round
6	(China) S Zhang	7^{7}	6
Q	(Spain) M Bassols Ribera	6^{3}	3
(France) J Ponchet	2	0
(Germany) M Barthel	6	6
(Poland) L Klimovičová	6	4	6
(France) T Rakotomanga Rajaonah	1	6	3
A Korneeva	1	1
9	(Uzbekistan) K Rakhimova	6	6
7	(Italy) L Bronzetti	7	0	2
WC	(France) C Paquet	5	6	6
(Czech Republic) D Šalková	5	6	7^{7}
WC	(Belgium) J Vandromme	7	3	6^{5}
Q	(Ukraine) V Podrez	6	6
A Charaeva	1	1
(Spain) A Bolsova	4	2
2	(Croatia) A Ružić	6	6

Second round
6	(China) S Zhang	1	4
(Germany) M Barthel	6	6
(Poland) L Klimovičová	0	7^{7}	3
9	(Uzbekistan) K Rakhimova	6	6^{5}	6
WC	(France) C Paquet	6	1	2
(Czech Republic) D Šalková	4	6	6
Q	(Ukraine) V Podrez	1	1
2	(Croatia) A Ružić	6	6

Quarterfinals
(Germany) M Barthel	3	6^{3}
9	(Uzbekistan) K Rakhimova	6	7^{7}
(Czech Republic) D Šalková	7	2	2
2	(Croatia) A Ružić	5	6	6

Semifinals
9	(Uzbekistan) K Rakhimova	4	6	7
2	(Croatia) A Ružić	6	3	5

== Qualifying ==
=== Seeds ===
1. (Spain) Marina Bassols Ribera (qualified)
2. (United Kingdom) Lily Miyazaki (qualified)
3. (Czech Republic) Anna Sisková (qualifying competition, lucky loser)
4. (Ukraine) Veronika Podrez (qualified)

=== Qualifiers ===
1. (Spain) Marina Bassols Ribera
2. (United Kingdom) Lily Miyazaki
3. (Australia) Tina Smith
4. (Ukraine) Veronika Podrez

=== Lucky losers ===
1. (France) Amandine Monnot
2. (Czech Republic) Anna Sisková

=== Qualifying draw ===
==== First qualifier ====
Qualifying competition
1	(Spain) Marina Bassols Ribera
	Bye

==== Second qualifier ====
Qualifying competition
2	(United Kingdom) Lily Miyazaki
	Bye

==== Third qualifier ====
Qualifying competition
3	(Czech Republic) Anna Sisková	6	6^{4}	6^{5}
	(Australia) Tina Smith	4	7^{7}	7^{7}

==== Fourth qualifier ====
Qualifying competition
4	(Ukraine) Veronika Podrez	6	6
WC	(France) Amandine Monnot	4	2
