= Andrea Lázaro García =

Spanish tennis player (born 1994)

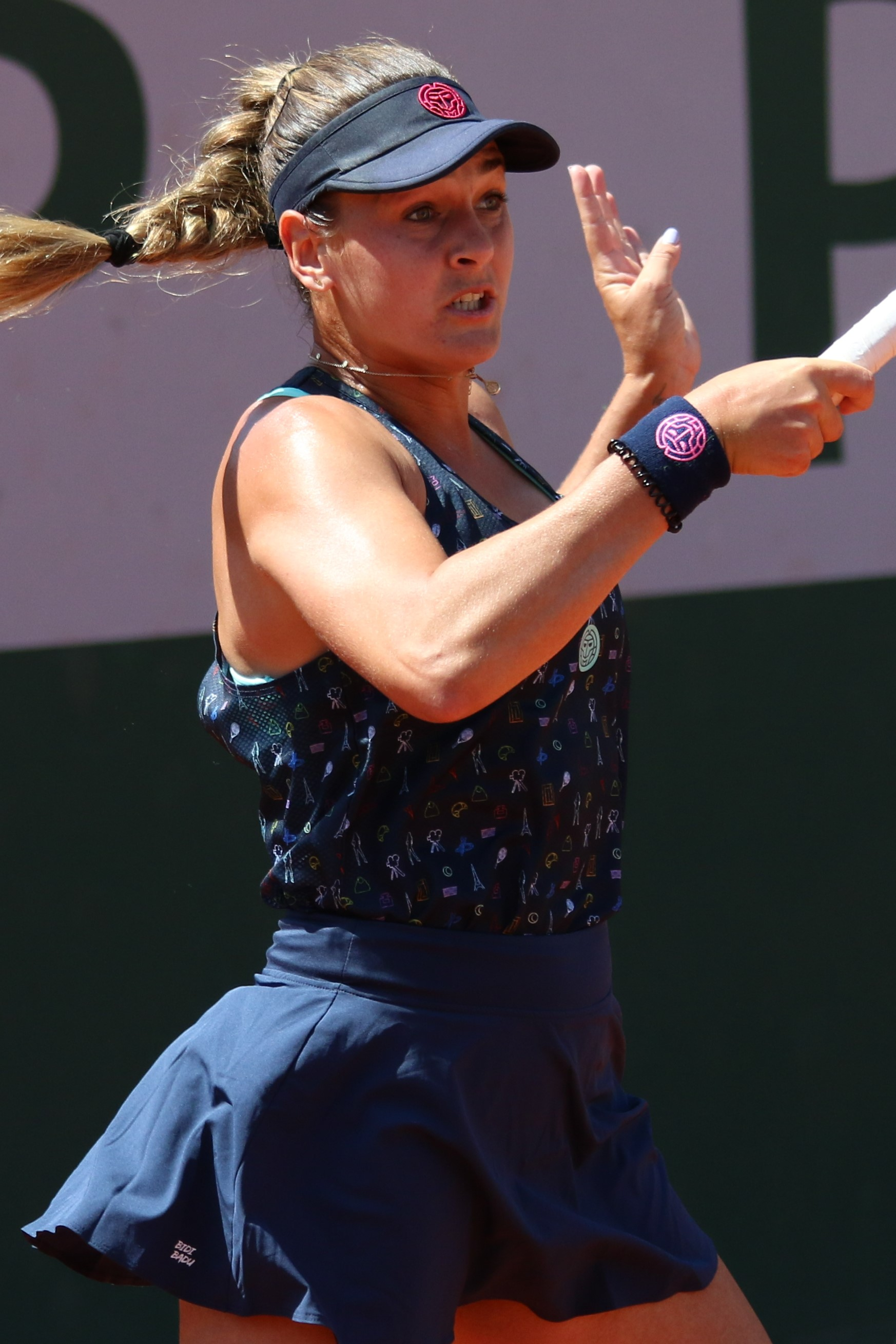
- Lázaro García at the 2022 French Open
- Country (sports): Spain
- Born: 4 November 1994 (age 32) Barcelona, Spain
- Height: 1.70 m (5 ft 7 in)
- Plays: Right (two-handed backhand)
- College: Florida International University
- Prize money: $648,894

Singles
- Career record: 336–217
- Career titles: 1 WTA 125
- Highest ranking: No. 136 (21 September 2026)
- Current ranking: No. 137 (28 September 2026)

Grand Slam singles results
- Australian Open: Q2 (2022)
- French Open: Q1 (2022, 2025, 2026)
- Wimbledon: Q2 (2022, 2026)
- US Open: Q3 (2026)

Doubles
- Career record: 114–70
- Career titles: 9 ITF
- Highest ranking: No. 162 (31 October 2022)
- Current ranking: No. 472 (28 September 2026)
- Last updated on: 4 October 2026.

Andrea Lázaro García (born 4 November 1994) is a Spanish professional tennis player. She has career-high WTA rankings of world No. 136 in singles, achieved on 21 September 2026, and No. 162 in doubles, set on 31 October 2022. She has won one WTA 125 singles title, along with ten singles titles and nine doubles titles on the ITF Women's Circuit.

== Career ==
Lázaro García made her main-draw WTA Tour debut at the 2021 Internationaux de Strasbourg, where she qualified for the main draw, but lost to top seed Bianca Andreescu in the first round. She won her first WTA 125 title at the 2026 Dubrovnik Open, defeating Anhelina Kalinina in the final.

== Performance timeline ==
Key
W	F	SF	QF	#R	RR	Q#	DNQ	A	NH

(W) winner; (F) finalist; (SF) semifinalist; (QF) quarterfinalist; (#R) rounds 4, 3, 2, 1; (RR) round-robin stage; (Q#) qualification round; (DNQ) did not qualify; (A) absent; (NH) not held; (SR) strike rate (events won / competed); (W–L) win–loss record.
To avoid confusion and double counting, these charts are updated at the conclusion of a tournament or when the player's participation has ended.

=== Singles ===
Current through the 2026 US Open.

Tournament	2021	2022	2023	2024	2025	2026	SR	W–L
Grand Slam tournaments
Australian Open	A	Q2	A	A	A	Q1	0 / 0	0–0
French Open	A	Q1	A	A	Q1	Q1	0 / 0	0–0
Wimbledon	A	Q2	A	A	Q1	Q2	0 / 0	0–0
US Open	Q1	Q1	A	A	Q1	Q3	0 / 0	0–0
Win–loss	0–0	0–0	0–0	0–0	0–0	0–0	0 / 0	0–0
WTA 1000 tournaments
Madrid Open	A	A	Q1	A	A	A	0 / 0	0–0
China Open								
Career statistics
Tournaments	1	0	0	0	0	0	Career total: 1	
Overall win-loss	0–1	0–0	0–0	0–0	0–0	0–0	0 / 1	0–1
Year-end ranking	235	276	448	244	182		$648,894	

== WTA 125 finals ==
=== Singles: 2 (1 title, 1 runner-up) ===
Result	W–L	Date	Tournament	Surface	Opponents	Score
Loss	0–1	Feb 2026	Les Sables d'Olonne Open, France	Hard (i)	(Czech Republic) Dominika Šalková	4–6, 0–6
Win	1–1	Mar 2026	Dubrovnik Open, Croatia	Clay	(Ukraine) Anhelina Kalinina	3–6, 6–4, 6–3

== ITF Circuit finals ==
=== Singles: 20 (10 titles, 10 runner-ups) ===
Legend W100 tournaments W60/75 tournaments W50 tournaments W25/35 tournaments W10/15 tournaments	Finals by surface Hard (4–2) Clay (6–8) (Note: The final was abandoned due to poor weather with Lázaro García leading 7–5, 6–5. Both players agreed to split ranking points and prize money.)

Result	W–L	Date	Tournament	Tier	Surface	Opponent	Score
Win	1–0	Apr 2012	ITF Torrent, Spain	W10	Clay	(Italy) Giulia Gatto-Monticone	6–0, 3–6, 4–1 ret.
Win	2–0	Jul 2013	ITF Valladolid, Spain	W10	Hard	(Italy) Camilla Rosatello	6–3, 3–6, 6–0
Loss	2–1	Jun 2017	ITF Hammamet, Tunisia	W15	Clay	(Australia) Seone Mendez	1–6, 6–3, 0–6
Loss	2–2	Jul 2018	ITF Hammamet, Tunisia	W15	Clay	(Chile) Fernanda Brito	1–6, 0–6
Win	3–2	Sep 2018	ITF Monastir, Tunisia	W15	Hard	(France) Caroline Romeo	7–6^{(4)}, 6–4
Win	4–2	Sep 2018	ITF Monastir, Tunisia	W15	Hard	(France) Victoria Muntean	6–0, 6–2
Loss	4–3	Feb 2019	ITF Monastir, Tunisia	W15	Hard	(Poland) Marta Leśniak	6–2, 0–6, 0–6
Win	5–3	Oct 2019	ITF Riba-roja de Túria, Spain	W25	Clay	(Belgium) Marie Benoît	7–6^{(4)}, 7–5
Loss	5–4	Jan 2020	ITF Daytona Beach, United States	W25	Clay	(Belgium) Marie Benoît	4–6, 0–6
Finalist	–NP-	Nov 2020	ITF Las Palmas, Spain	W15	Clay	(Belgium) Maryna Zanevska	cancelled
Win	6–4	Feb 2022	ITF Manacor, Spain	W25	Hard	(France) Elsa Jacquemot	2–6, 7–6^{(2)}, 6–1
Loss	6–5	May 2022	Koper Open, Slovenia	W60	Clay	(Liechtenstein) Kathinka von Deichmann	6–3, 3–6, 2–6
Win	7–5	Jan 2024	ITF Antalya, Turkey	W15	Clay	(Romania) Andreea Prisăcariu	4–6, 6–3, 6–1
Win	8–5	Apr 2024	ITF Santa Margherita di Pula, Italy	W35	Clay	(Italy) Lisa Pigato	7–6^{(4)}, 6–3
Loss	8–6	May 2024	ITF Santa Margherita di Pula, Italy	W35	Clay	(Switzerland) Jil Teichmann	3–6, 4–6
Win	9–6	Jul 2024	ITF Casablanca, Morocco	W35	Clay	(Spain) Carlota Martínez Círez	7–6^{(2)}, 6–3
Loss	9–7	Aug 2024	ITF Gran Canaria, Spain	W100	Clay	(Spain) Nuria Párrizas Díaz	4–6, 3–6
Loss	9–8	Jan 2025	ITF La Marsa, Tunisia	W50	Hard	(Poland) Linda Klimovičová	3–6, 2–6
Win	10–8	Jun 2025	Internazionali di Caserta, Italy	W75	Clay	(France) Alice Ramé	4–6, 6–3, 6–0
Loss	10–9	Sep 2025	Pazardzhik Cup, Bulgaria	W50+H	Clay	(Czech Republic) Laura Samson	2–6, 3–6
Loss	10–10	May 2026	Open Saint-Gaudens, France	W75	Clay	(Spain) Kaitlin Quevedo	3–6, 2–6

=== Doubles: 16 (9 titles, 7 runner-ups) ===
Legend W100 tournaments W60 tournaments W50 tournaments W25 tournaments W15 tournaments	Finals by surface Hard (5–3) Clay (4–4)

Result	W–L	Date	Tournament	Tier	Surface	Partner	Opponents	Score
Win	1–0	Jul 2018	ITF Hammamet, Tunisia	W15	Clay	(Spain) Irene Burillo	(Chile) Fernanda Brito (Guatemala) Melissa Morales	6–4, 6–4
Win	2–0	Sep 2018	ITF Monastir, Tunisia	W15	Hard	(Spain) Paula Arias Manjon	(Cambodia) Andrea Ka (Tunisia) Chiraz Bechri	6–1, 6–0
Win	3–0	Sep 2018	ITF Monastir	W15	Hard	(Spain) Paula Arias Manjon	(Venezuela) Nadia Echeverria Alam (United Kingdom) Anna Popescu	7–5, 6–0
Loss	3–1	Feb 2019	ITF Monastir	W15	Hard	(Greece) Despina Papamichail	(Romania) Miriam Bulgaru (Romania) Cristina Ene	3–6, 6–7^{(5)}
Loss	3–2	Feb 2019	ITF Monastir	W15	Hard	(Greece) Despina Papamichail	(Netherlands) Arianne Hartono (Netherlands) Eva Vedder	4–6, 6–3, [7–10]
Loss	3–3	Sep 2019	ITF Vienna, Austria	W25	Clay	(Spain) Irene Burillo	(Germany) Vivian Heisen (Germany) Katharina Hobgarski	6–7^{(4)}, 4–6
Win	4–3	Sep 2019	ITF Marbella, Spain	W25	Clay	(Spain) Irene Burillo	(Netherlands) Arantxa Rus (United Kingdom) Gabriella Taylor	5–7, 6–4, [10–4]
Loss	4–4	Jan 2020	Vero Beach Open, United States	W25	Clay	(Spain) Irene Burillo	(Hungary) Panna Udvardy (Chinese Taipei) Hsu Chieh-yu	5–7, 6–4, [7–10]
Win	5–4	Jan 2022	ITF Manacor, Spain	W25	Hard	(Mexico) Fernanda Contreras	(Slovakia) Tereza Mihalíková (Czech Republic) Linda Nosková	6–1, 6–4
Win	6–4	Feb 2022	ITF Manacor, Spain	W25	Hard	(Mexico) Fernanda Contreras	(Slovakia) Tereza Mihalíková (Czech Republic) Linda Nosková	6–1, 3–6, [10–6]
Win	7–4	Jul 2022	Open de Montpellier, France	W60	Clay	(Ecuador) Andrea Gámiz	(France) Estelle Cascino; Irina Khromacheva	6–4, 2–6, [13–11]
Loss	7–5	Oct 2022	Lisboa Belém Open, Portugal	W25	Clay	(Spain) Irene Burillo	(Portugal) Francisca Jorge (Portugal) Matilde Jorge	2–6, 2–6
Win	8–5	Oct 2022	ITF Cherbourg-en-Cotentin, France	W25+H	Hard (i)	(Spain) Irene Burillo	(India) Ankita Raina (Netherlands) Rosalie van der Hoek	6–3, 6–4
Loss	8–6	Oct 2022	GB Pro-Series Glasgow, United Kingdom	W60	Hard (i)	(Spain) Irene Burillo	(United Kingdom) Freya Christie (United Kingdom) Ali Collins	4–6, 1–6
Loss	8–7	Apr 2025	Open Villa de Madrid, Spain	W100	Clay	(Spain) Marina Bassols Ribera	(Italy) Nicole Fossa Huergo (Kazakhstan) Zhibek Kulambayeva	6–7^{(7)}, 7–6^{(4)}, [7–10]
Win	9–7	Nov 2025	ITF Heraklion, Greece	W50	Clay	(Spain) Guiomar Maristany	(Greece) Marianne Argyrokastriti (Ukraine) Kateryna Diatlova	walkover
