= Chiasso Open =

Tennis tournament in Switzerland

- 2024 Axion Open

ITF Women's Tour
- Event name: Chiasso Open (2011–18); Axion Open (2019–)
- Location: Chiasso, Switzerland
- Venue: Tennis Club Chiasso
- Category: ITF Women's World Tennis Tour
- Surface: Clay / outdoor
- Draw: 32S/32Q/16D
- Prize money: $60,000
- Website: axionopen.com

The Chiasso Open (currently sponsored as the Axion Open) is a tournament for professional female tennis players played on outdoor clay courts. The event is classified as a $60,000 ITF Women's World Tennis Tour tournament and has been held in Chiasso, Switzerland, since 2011.

== Past finals ==
=== Singles ===
Year	Champion	Runner-up	Score
2026	(Uzbekistan) Maria Timofeeva	(Italy) Lisa Pigato	6–2, 6–3
2025	(Austria) Julia Grabher	(Ukraine) Katarina Zavatska	6–1, 6–2
2024	(Argentina) Julia Riera	(Hungary) Anna Bondár	6–3, 7–6^{(7–2)}
2023	Mirra Andreeva	(Switzerland) Céline Naef	1–6, 7–6^{(7–3)}, 6–0
2022	(Italy) Lucia Bronzetti	(Switzerland) Simona Waltert	2–6, 6–3, 6–3
2020–21	Tournament cancelled due to the COVID-19 pandemic		
2019	(Russia) Varvara Gracheva	(Romania) Jaqueline Cristian	6–4, 6–2
2018	(Netherlands) Cindy Buger	(Romania) Raluca Șerban	6–7^{(4–7)}, 6–4, 6–3
2017	(Switzerland) Jil Teichmann	(Liechtenstein) Kathinka von Deichmann	2–6, 6–3, 6–2
2016	(Bulgaria) Isabella Shinikova	(United Kingdom) Amanda Carreras	6–3, 7–6^{(7–1)}
2015	(Hungary) Réka Luca Jani	(Romania) Alexandra Cadanțu	3–6, 6–3, 7–6^{(8–6)}
2014	(Czech Republic) Lucie Hradecká	(Croatia) Tereza Mrdeža	6–3, 7–6^{(7–4)}
2013	(Belgium) Alison Van Uytvanck	(Poland) Katarzyna Kawa	7–6^{(7–2)}, 6–3
2012	(Switzerland) Amra Sadiković	(Croatia) Tereza Mrdeža	6–3, 6–3
2011	(Puerto Rico) Monica Puig	(Czech Republic) Andrea Hlaváčková	7–6^{(7–4)}, 7–5

=== Doubles ===
Year	Champions	Runners-up	Score
2026	(United States) Rasheeda McAdoo (Greece) Sapfo Sakellaridi	(Czech Republic) Aneta Kučmová (Czech Republic) Aneta Laboutková	6–2, 3–6, [10–8]
2025	(United Kingdom) Alicia Barnett (France) Elixane Lechemia	(Algeria) Inès Ibbou (Netherlands) Bibiane Schoofs	6–2, 6–3
2024	(United Kingdom) Emily Appleton (Germany) Lena Papadakis	(Greece) Despina Papamichail (Switzerland) Simona Waltert	4–6, 6–4, [10–6]
2023	(United Kingdom) Emily Appleton (Germany) Julia Lohoff	(Romania) Andreea Mitu (Argentina) Nadia Podoroska	6–1, 6–2
2022	(Czech Republic) Anastasia Dețiuc (Czech Republic) Miriam Kolodziejová	(Spain) Aliona Bolsova; Oksana Selekhmeteva	6–3, 1–6, [10–8]
2020–21	Tournament cancelled due to the COVID-19 pandemic		
2019	(Spain) Cristina Bucșa (Ukraine) Marta Kostyuk	(Canada) Sharon Fichman (Australia) Jaimee Fourlis	6–1, 3–6, [10–7]
2018	(Croatia) Darija Jurak (Australia) Jessica Moore	(Netherlands) Cindy Burger (Netherlands) Rosalie van der Hoek	7–6^{(8–6)}, 4–6, [10–8]
2017	(North Macedonia) Lina Gjorcheska (Bulgaria) Aleksandrina Naydenova	(Czech Republic) Kateřina Kramperová (Netherlands) Rosalie van der Hoek	7–5, 2–6, [10–7]
2016	(Germany) Antonia Lottner (Germany) Anne Schäfer	(Poland) Olga Brózda (Poland) Katarzyna Kawa	6–1, 6–1
2015	(Romania) Diana Buzean (Hungary) Réka Luca Jani	(Italy) Giulia Gatto-Monticone (Italy) Alice Matteucci	6–2, 7–5
2014	(Switzerland) Chiara Grimm (Switzerland) Jil Teichmann	(Italy) Alice Matteucci (Italy) Camilla Rosatello	7–5, 6–3
2013	(Latvia) Diāna Marcinkēviča (Belarus) Aliaksandra Sasnovich	(Italy) Nicole Clerico (Italy) Giulia Gatto-Monticone	6–7^{(2–7)}, 6–4, [10–7]
2012	(Russia) Daria Gavrilova (Russia) Irina Khromacheva	(Switzerland) Conny Perrin (Slovenia) Maša Zec Peškirič	6–0, 7–6^{(7–1)}
2011	(Austria) Yvonne Meusburger (Germany) Kathrin Wörle	(France) Claire Feuerstein (France) Anaïs Laurendon	6–3, 6–3
