= Tamara Korpatsch =

German tennis player (born 1995)

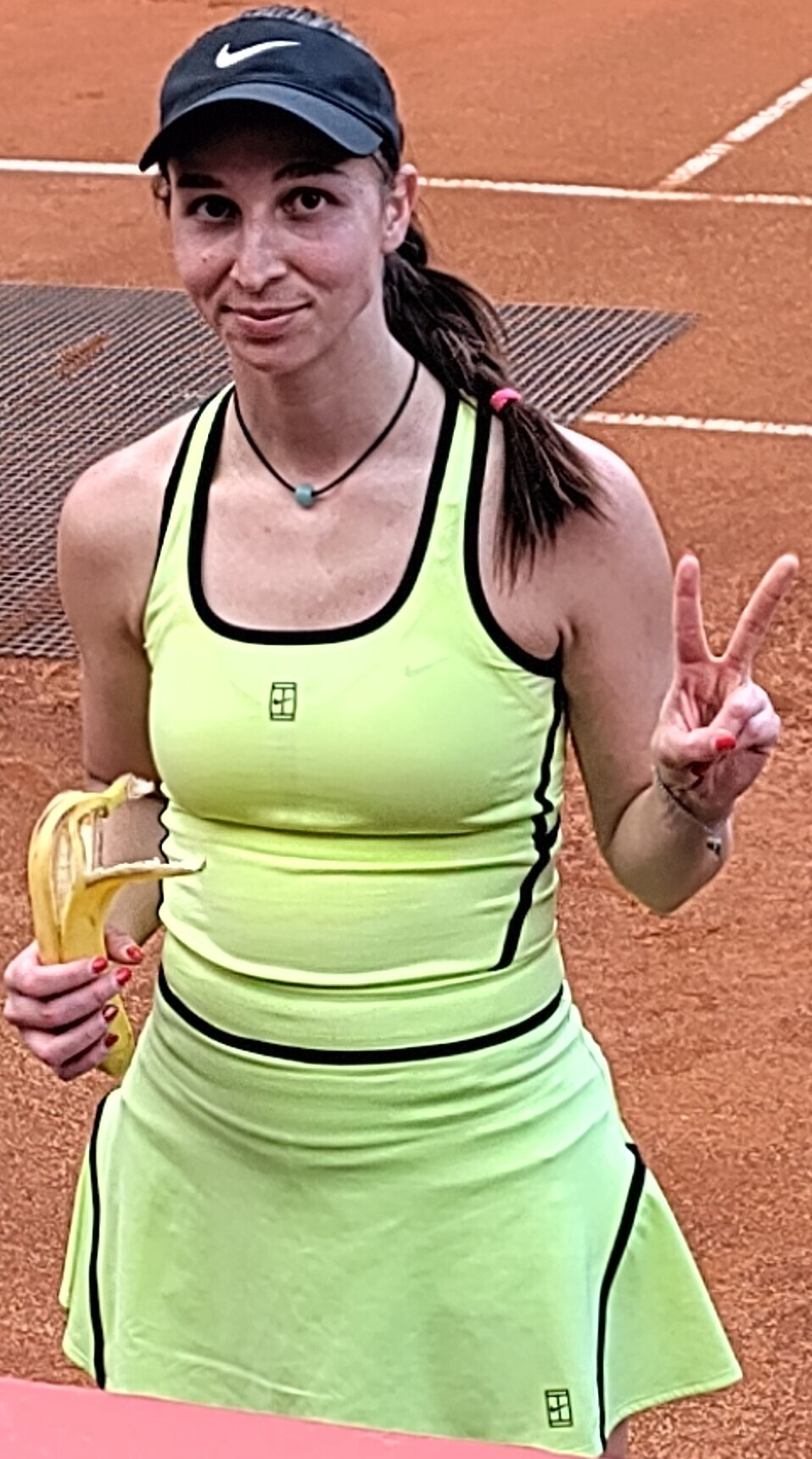
- Korpatsch at the 2026 Dubrovnik Open
- Country (sports): Germany
- Residence: Hamburg, Germany
- Born: 12 May 1995 (age 31) Hamburg
- Height: 1.68 m (5 ft 6 in)
- Plays: Right-handed (two-handed backhand)
- Coach: Thomas Korpatsch
- Prize money: US$2,922,530

Singles
- Career record: 420–328
- Career titles: 2
- Highest ranking: No. 46 (27 July 2026)
- Current ranking: No. 56 (19 October 2026)

Grand Slam singles results
- Australian Open: 2R (2024)
- French Open: 3R (2026)
- Wimbledon: 2R (2023)
- US Open: 2R (2023)

Other tournaments
- Olympic Games: 1R (2024)

Doubles
- Career record: 26–72
- Career titles: 0
- Highest ranking: No. 129 (14 September 2026)
- Current ranking: No. 129 (14 September 2026)

Grand Slam doubles results
- Australian Open: 3R (2024)
- French Open: 2R (2026)
- Wimbledon: 2R (2026)
- US Open: 2R (2026)

Other doubles tournaments
- Olympic Games: 1R (2024)
- Last updated on: 14 September 2026.

Tamara Korpatsch (born 12 May 1995) is a German tennis player. She has a career-high singles WTA ranking of world No. 46, achieved on 27 July 2026 and a best doubles ranking of No. 129, attained on 14 September 2026.

Korpatsch won two singles titles on the WTA Tour. She has also won one singles title on the WTA 125 and 13 singles titles on the ITF Circuit.

== Career ==
=== 2016–17: WTA Tour debut ===
Korpatsch made her WTA Tour debut at the Swiss Open in the doubles draw, partnering Ekaterina Yashina.

In December 2017, she won the singles title at the National German Championships.

=== 2020: Grand Slam debut ===
Korpatsch made her Grand Slam main-draw debut at the French Open, where she lost to 25th seed Amanda Anisimova in the first round.

At the US Open, she was defeated by wildcard entrant CiCi Bellis in three sets.

=== 2022: Top 100 debut ===
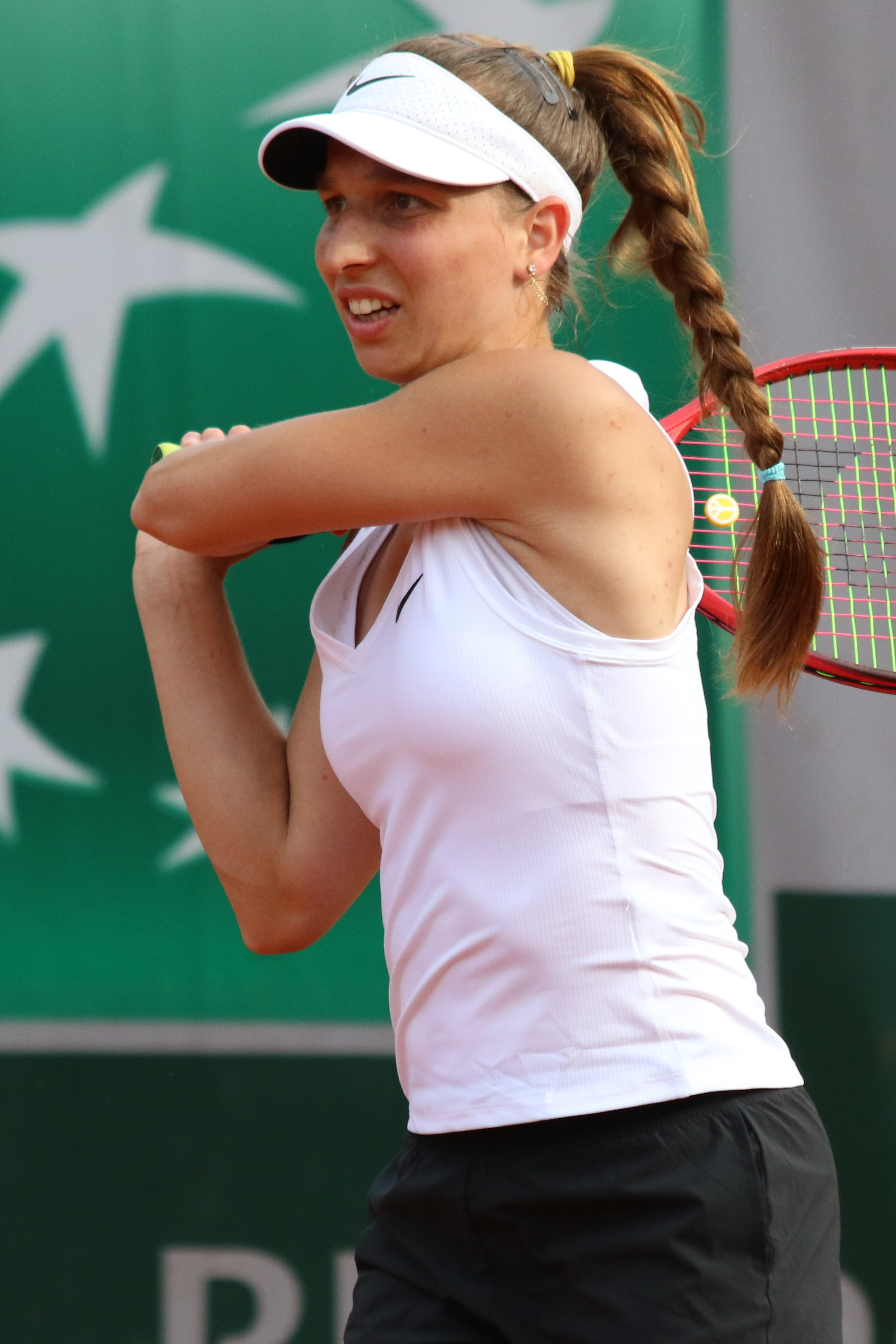
Korpatsch in the 2022 French Open qualifying

In June, Korpatsch made her third major main-draw debut at the Wimbledon Championships where she lost to Heather Watson. Korpatsch had also entered the doubles competition but her partner, Harmony Tan, withdrew only an hour before their match prompting her to express, in a since-deleted social media post, her anger and disappointment at not being able to participate in the event on her debut.

She won her first WTA 125 tournament title at the Budapest Open defeating Viktoriya Tomova in the final.

She finished the year ranked No. 89 in the world.

=== 2023: First Major win and WTA title ===
Korpatsch entered Wimbledon as a lucky loser and recorded her first main-draw win at this Major over Carol Zhao.

Ranked No. 105, she won her first WTA Tour title in her career, at the 2023 Transylvania Open in Cluj Napoca, with a win over Romanian Elena-Gabriela Ruse in the final. As a result, she climbed nearly 35 positions and reached a career high at No. 71 on 23 October 2023.

As a qualifier, Korpatsch reached the semifinals at the 2023 Prague Open, losing to fourth seed Linda Nosková.

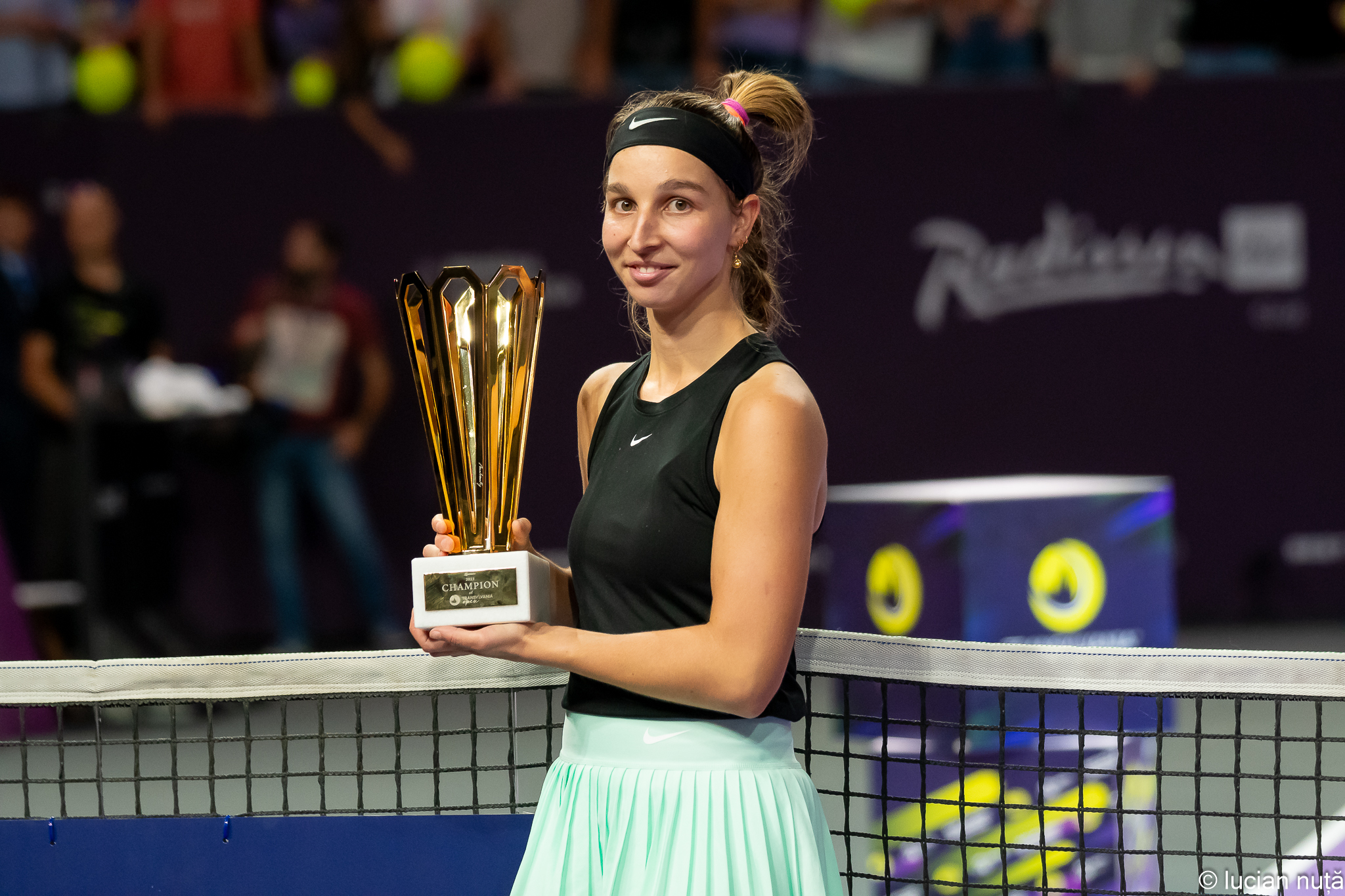
Korpatsch with the 2023 Transylvania Open trophy

=== 2024-25: Major doubles third round ===
After the withdrawal of top seeds Coco Gauff and Jessica Pegula, she entered the 2024 Australian Open women's doubles as an alternate pair, partnering Elixane Lechemia, and reached the third round of a major for the first time in her career, but lost to Caroline Garcia and Kristina Mladenovic. At the 2024 French Open, Korpatsch defeated Ashlyn Krueger to make it into the second round at this event for the first time.

At the 2025 Jiangxi Open, Korpatsch reached her first WTA Tour quarterfinal since 2023, losing to wildcard entrant Lilli Tagger. Teaming up with Jessika Ponchet, she won her first WTA 125 doubles title at the 2025 Open Angers Arena Loire, defeating Jesika Malečková and Miriam Škoch in the final. At the same tournament, she was runner-up in the singles, losing the final to Kamilla Rakhimova.

=== 2026: Major singles third round, WTA title, top 50 ===
Korpatsch recorded wins over qualifier Anna Sisková, second seed Emiliana Arango, sixth seed Caty McNally and Diane Parry to make it into her second WTA Tour singles final at the 2026 Ostrava Open. She lost the championship match to Katie Boulter in three sets.

In May 2026, Korpatsch reached the final at the WTA 125 Catalonia Open, but was defeated by seventh seed Daria Kasatkina in three sets. At the 2026 French Open she reached a Grand Slam singles third round for the first time, but lost to Elina Svitolina.

Korpatsch defeated Anna Bondár to win her second WTA Tour title, this time in her hometown, at the 2026 Hamburg Open. She was the first German woman to win the Hamburg Open since Steffi Graf in 1992.

== Performance timelines ==
Key
W	F	SF	QF	#R	RR	Q#	P#	DNQ	A	Z#	PO	G	S	B	NMS	NTI	P	NH

(W) winner; (F) finalist; (SF) semifinalist; (QF) quarterfinalist; (#R) rounds 4, 3, 2, 1; (RR) round-robin stage; (Q#) qualification round; (P#) preliminary round; (DNQ) did not qualify; (A) absent; (Z#) Davis/Fed Cup Zonal Group (with number indication) or (PO) play-off; (G) gold, (S) silver or (B) bronze Olympic/Paralympic medal; (NMS) not a Masters tournament; (NTI) not a Tier I tournament; (P) postponed; (NH) not held; (SR) strike rate (events won / competed); (W–L) win–loss record.
To avoid confusion and double counting, these charts are updated at the conclusion of a tournament or when the player's participation has ended.

Only main-draw results in WTA Tour, Grand Slam tournaments, Billie Jean King Cup and Olympic Games are included in win–loss records.

=== Singles ===
Current through the 2026 WTA Tour.

Tournament	2016	2017	2018	2019	2020	2021	2022	2023	2024	2025	2026	SR	W–L	Win%
Grand Slam tournaments
Australian Open	A	A	A	A	A	A	A	1R	2R	Q2	Q3	0 / 2	1–2	33%
French Open	A	Q2	Q3	Q2	1R	Q2	Q2	Q1	2R	1R	3R	0 / 4	3–4	43%
Wimbledon	A	Q3	Q1	Q2	NH	A	1R	2R	1R	Q1	1R	0 / 4	1–4	20%
US Open	Q1	Q1	Q2	A	1R	A	Q3	2R	1R	A	1R	0 / 4	1–4	20%
Win–loss	0–0	0–0	0–0	0–0	0–2	0–0	0–1	2–3	2–4	0–1	2–3	0 / 14	6–14	30%
National representation
Olympic Games	A	not held				A	not held		1R	not held		0 / 1	0–1	0%
WTA 1000 tournaments
Indian Wells Open	A	A	A	A	NH	A	A	A	1R	A	A	0 / 1	0–1	0%
Miami Open	A	A	A	A	NH	A	A	1R	1R	A	A	0 / 2	0–2	0%
Madrid Open	A	A	A	A	NH	A	Q1	Q2	A	A	Q2	0 / 0	0–0	–
Italian Open	A	A	A	A	A	A	A	A	A	A	1R	0 / 1	0–1	0%
Canadian Open	A	A	A	A	NH	A	A	A	A	A	1R	0 / 1	0–1	0%
Cincinnati Open	A	A	A	A	A	A	A	A	Q1	A	2R	0 / 1	1–1	50%
China Open	A	A	A	A	NH			Q1	1R	A	1R	0 / 2	0–2	0%
Wuhan Open	A	A	A	A	NH				Q1	A	A	0 / 0	0–0	–
Win–loss	0–0	0–0	0–0	0–0	0–0	0–0	0–0	0–1	0–3	0–0	1–4	0 / 8	1–8	11%
Career statistics
Tournaments	0	5	3	6	2	5	9	15	17	3	12	Career total: 77		
Titles	0	0	0	0	0	0	0	1	0	0	1	Career total: 2		
Finals	0	0	0	0	0	0	0	1	0	0	2	Career total: 3		
Hard win–loss	0–0	1–1	0–0	0–3	0–1	0–0	1–2	10–10	3–9	2–1	5–5	1 / 33	22–32	41%
Clay win–loss	0–0	2–3	4–3	5–3	0–1	4–4	1–3	2–3	1–5	1–2	8–4	1 / 32	28–31	47%
Grass win–loss	0–0	0–1	0–0	0–0	0–0	1–1	0–4	1–1	0–3	0–0	0–2	0 / 12	2–12	14%
Overall win–loss	0–0	3–5	4–3	5–6	0–2	5–5	2–9	13–14	4–17	3–3	13–11	2 / 77	52–75	41%
Year-end ranking	162	145	121	113	126	176	89	73	185	151	67			

=== Doubles ===
Current through the 2026 WTA Tour.

Tournament	2016	2017	2018	2019	2020	2021	2022	2023	2024	2025	2026	SR	W–L
Grand Slam tournaments
Australian Open	A	A	A	A	A	A	A	1R	3R	A	A	0 / 2	1–2
French Open	A	A	A	A	A	A	A	A	1R	A	2R	0 / 2	1–2
Wimbledon	A	A	A	A	NH	A	A	A	1R	A	2R	0 / 2	1–2
US Open	A	A	A	A	A	A	A	A	A	A	2R	0 / 1	1–1
Win–loss	0–0	0–0	0–0	0–0	0–0	0–0	0–0	0–1	1–3	0–0	3–3	0 / 7	4–7
National representation
Olympic Games	A	not held				A	not held		1R	not held		0 / 1	0–1
WTA 1000 tournaments
Cincinnati Open	A	A	A	A	A	A	A	A	A	A	1R	0 / 1	0–1
Career statistics
Tournaments	1	1	1	1	0	4	1	4	7	0	6	26	
Titles	0	0	0	0	0	0	0	0	0	0	0	0	
Finals	0	0	0	0	0	1	0	0	0	0	0	1	
Overall win–loss	0–1	0–1	0–1	0–1	0–0	3–4	0–1	0–4	1–7	0–0	4–6	8–26	
Year-end ranking	1062	623	864	871	910	318	1092	1205	294	761	125	24%	

== WTA Tour finals ==
=== Singles: 3 (2 titles, 1 runner-up) ===
Legend WTA 1000 WTA 500 WTA 250 (2–1)	Finals by surface Hard (1–1) Clay (1–0)

Result	W–L	Date	Tournament	Tier	Surface	Opponent	Score
Win	1–0	Oct 2023	Transylvania Open, Romania	WTA 250	Hard (i)	(Romania) Elena-Gabriela Ruse	6–3, 6–4
Loss	1–1	Feb 2026	Ostrava Open, Czech Republic	WTA 250	Hard (i)	(United Kingdom) Katie Boulter	7–5, 2–6, 1–6
Win	2–1	Jul 2026	Hamburg Open, Germany	WTA 250	Clay	(Hungary) Anna Bondár	6–3, 6–3

=== Doubles: 1 (runner-up) ===
Legend WTA 250 (0–1)	Finals by surface Clay (0–1)

Result	W–L	Date	Tournament	Tier	Surface	Partner	Opponent	Score
Loss	0–1	Jul 2021	Budapest Grand Prix, Hungary	WTA 250	Clay	(Spain) Aliona Bolsova	(Romania) Mihaela Buzărnescu (Hungary) Fanny Stollár	4–6, 4–6

== WTA 125 finals ==
=== Singles: 4 (1 title, 3 runner-ups) ===
Result	W–L	Date	Tournament	Surface	Opponent	Score
Loss	0–1	Apr 2022	Marbella Open, Spain	Clay	(Egypt) Mayar Sherif	6–7^{(1–7)}, 4–6
Win	1–1	Sep 2022	Hungarian Ladies Open, Hungary	Clay	(Bulgaria) Viktoriya Tomova	7–6^{(7–3)}, 6–7^{(4–7)}, 6–0
Loss	1–2	Dec 2025	Open Angers Arena Loire, France	Hard (i)	(Uzbekistan) Kamilla Rakhimova	3–6, 6–7^{(4–7)}
Loss	1–3	May 2026	Catalonia Open, Spain	Clay	(Australia) Daria Kasatkina	6–2, 3–6, 5–7

=== Doubles: 1 (title) ===
Result	W–L	Date	Tournament	Surface	Partner	Opponents	Score
Win	1–1	Dec 2025	Open Angers Arena Loire, France	Hard (i)	(France) Jessika Ponchet	(Czech Republic) Jesika Malečková (Czech Republic) Miriam Škoch	6–3, 6–2

== ITF Circuit finals ==
=== Singles: 19 (13 titles, 6 runner-ups) ===
Legend W80 tournaments (1–1) W60/W75 tournaments (4–2) W50 tournaments (1–0) W25 tournaments (6–0) W10 tournaments (1–3)	Finals by surface Hard (1–1) Clay (12–4) Carpet (0–1)

Result	W–L	Date	Tournament	Tier	Surface	Opponent	Score
Loss	0–1	Aug 2013	ITF Ratingen, Germany	W10	Clay	(Germany) Julia Lohoff	3–6, 6–4, 4–6
Loss	0–2	Jun 2014	ITF Alkmaar, Netherlands	W10	Clay	(Belgium) Catherine Chantraine	6–3, 4–6, 4–6
Loss	0–3	Jan 2015	ITF Kaarst, Germany	W10	Carpet (i)	(Czech Republic) Kateřina Vaňková	6–2, 4–6, 4–6
Win	1–3	Sep 2015	ITF Brno, Czech Republic	W10	Clay	(Czech Republic) Vendula Žovincová	4–6, 7–6^{(7–3)}, 7–6^{(7–3)}
Win	2–3	Jun 2016	ITF Lenzerheide, Switzerland	W25	Clay	(Slovenia) Dalila Jakupović	4–6, 6–4, 6–2
Win	3–3	Jul 2016	ITF Darmstadt, Germany	W25	Clay	(France) Fiona Ferro	6–2, 6–2
Win	4–3	Jul 2016	ITF Horb, Germany	W25	Clay	(Czech Republic) Tereza Smitková	6–2, 6–1
Win	5–3	Jul 2016	ITF Bad Saulgau, Germany	W25	Clay	(Italy) Jasmine Paolini	6–2, 6–3
Win	6–3	Aug 2017	Ladies Open Hechingen, Germany	W60	Clay	(Italy) Deborah Chiesa	2–6, 7–6^{(7–5)}, 6–2
Win	7–3	Sep 2018	Open de Biarritz, France	W80	Clay	(Switzerland) Timea Bacsinszky	6–2, 7–5
Win	8–3	Jul 2019	ITF Prague Open, Czech Republic	W60	Clay	(Czech Republic) Denisa Allertová	7–5, 6–3
Win	9–3	Sep 2019	ITF Bagnatica, Italy	W25	Clay	(Italy) Martina Caregaro	6–1, 6–2
Loss	9–4	Sep 2019	Open de Valencia, Spain	W60	Clay	(Russia) Varvara Gracheva	6–3, 2–6, 0–6
Loss	9–5	Nov 2019	Open Nantes, France	W60	Hard (i)	(Spain) Cristina Bucșa	6–2, 6–7^{(11–13)}, 7–6^{(8–6)}
Win	10–5	Mar 2022	ITF Le Havre, France	W25	Clay (i)	Anna Blinkova	3–6, 6–2, 6–2
Win	11–5	Sep 2022	Montreux Ladies Open, Switzerland	W60	Clay	(United States) Emma Navarro	6–4, 6–1
Loss	11–6	Nov 2022	Open de Madrid, Spain	W80	Clay	(Spain) Aliona Bolsova	4–6, 2–6
Win	12–6	May 2025	Empire Slovak Open, Slovakia	W75	Clay	(Japan) Mai Hontama	1–6, 6–4, 6–4
Win	13–6	Nov 2025	ITF Funchal, Portugal	W50	Hard	(Sweden) Lea Nilsson	5–7, 7–5, 6–1
