= Miriam Škoch =

Czech tennis player (born 1997)

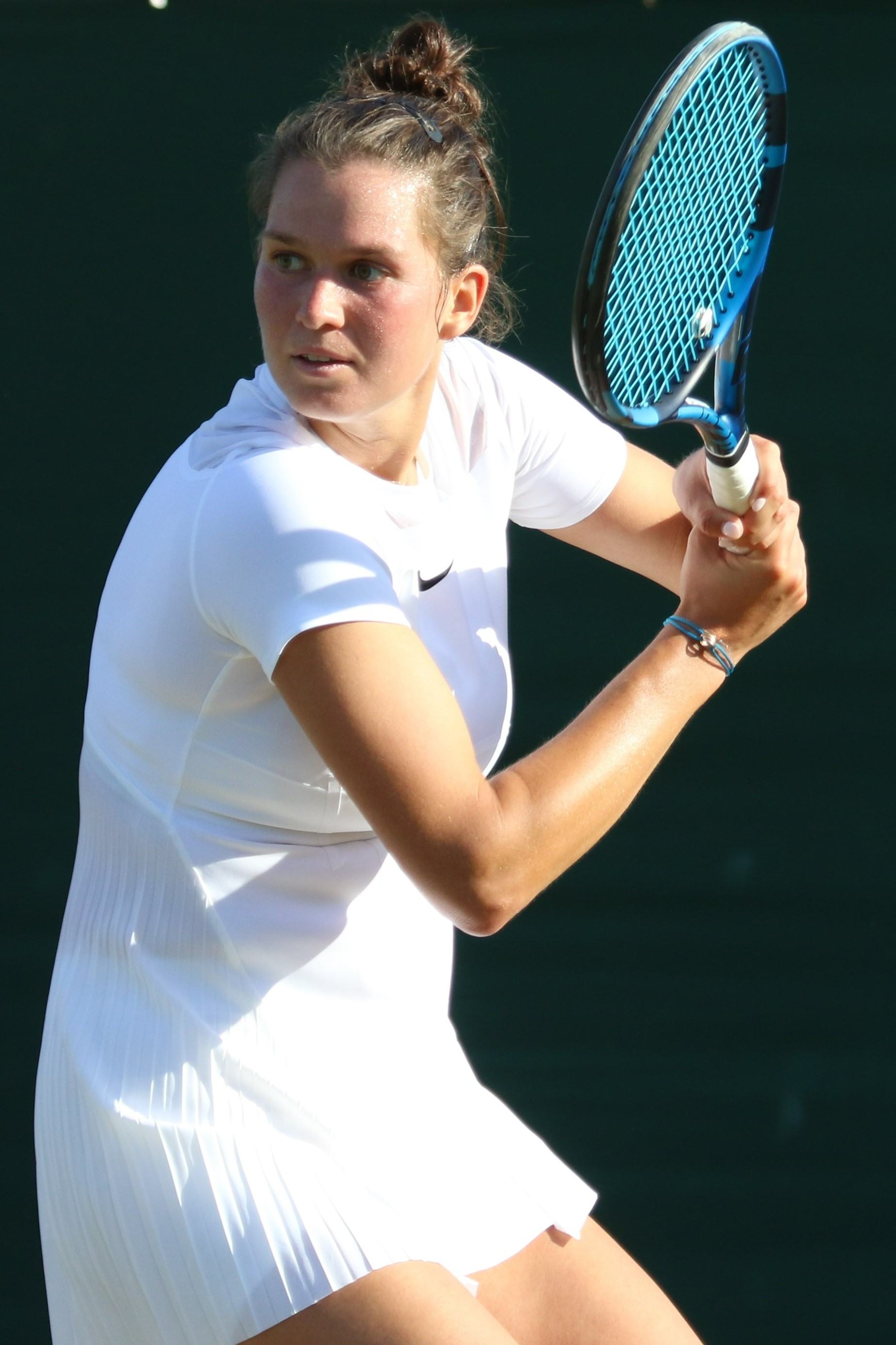
- Škoch at the 2022 Wimbledon Championships
- Country (sports): Czech Republic
- Born: 11 April 1997 (age 29) Litvínov, Czech Republic
- Height: 1.78 m (5 ft 10 in)
- Prize money: US$ 552,734

Singles
- Career record: 210–125
- Career titles: 0 WTA, 7 ITF
- Highest ranking: No. 247 (16 May 2022)

Grand Slam singles results
- Wimbledon: Q1 (2022)

Doubles
- Career record: 267–141
- Career titles: 2
- Highest ranking: No. 41 (11 September 2023)
- Current ranking: No. 48 (25 May 2026)

Grand Slam doubles results
- Australian Open: 3R (2023)
- French Open: 2R (2023, 2024)
- Wimbledon: 3R (2023)
- US Open: 2R (2023)
- Last updated on: 6 June 2026.

Miriam Škoch (née Kolodziejová; born 11 April 1997) is a Czech professional tennis player who has specialized in doubles. On 16 May 2022, she reached her best singles ranking of world No. 247. On 11 September 2023, she peaked at No. 41 in the WTA doubles rankings. Škoch has won two doubles titles on the WTA Tour and eight doubles titles on the WTA Challenger Tour. She has also won seven singles and 20 doubles titles on the ITF Circuit.

== Personal life ==
In July 2024, she married David Škoch, who has been her coach since 2022.

== Career ==
=== Junior success ===
==== Grand Slam performance ====
Singles:

- Australian Open: 2R (2015)
- French Open: 3R (2015)
- Wimbledon: 1R (2015)
- US Open: 1R (2014)

Doubles:

- Australian Open: W (2015)
- French Open: W (2015)
- Wimbledon: SF (2015)
- US Open: 1R (2014)

Kolodziejová won the girls' doubles event at the 2015 Australian Open with fellow Czech Markéta Vondroušová, defeating Katharina Hobgarski and Greet Minnen in the final. She then went on to win the girls' doubles event at the 2015 French Open with Vondroušová, defeating Caroline Dolehide and Katerina Stewart in the final.

=== Professional ===
Partnering Anastasia Dețiuc, she won her first WTA Tour doubles title at the 2022 Emilia-Romagna Open, defeating Arantxa Rus and Tamara Zidanšek in the final.

At the 2023 Australian Open, on her major debut, she reached the third round, partnering with Markéta Vondroušová as well as the third round at the 2023 Wimbledon Championships where the pair withdrew.

Playing with Anna Sisková, she won the doubles title at the 2024 Solgironès Open, after Tímea Babos and Dalma Gálfi withdrew from the final. At the 2024 French Open, she entered the main draw, partnering again Anna Sisková as an alternate pair, and defeated Russians Ekaterina Alexandrova and Anastasia Pavlyuchenkova, before losing to eventual champions, Kateřina Siniaková and Coco Gauff.

== Performance timelines ==
Key
W	F	SF	QF	#R	RR	Q#	P#	DNQ	A	Z#	PO	G	S	B	NMS	NTI	P	NH

(W) winner; (F) finalist; (SF) semifinalist; (QF) quarterfinalist; (#R) rounds 4, 3, 2, 1; (RR) round-robin stage; (Q#) qualification round; (P#) preliminary round; (DNQ) did not qualify; (A) absent; (Z#) Davis/Fed Cup Zonal Group (with number indication) or (PO) play-off; (G) gold, (S) silver or (B) bronze Olympic/Paralympic medal; (NMS) not a Masters tournament; (NTI) not a Tier I tournament; (P) postponed; (NH) not held; (SR) strike rate (events won / competed); (W–L) win–loss record.
To avoid confusion and double counting, these charts are updated at the conclusion of a tournament or when the player's participation has ended.

Only main-draw results in WTA Tour, Grand Slam tournaments, Billie Jean King Cup, United Cup, Hopman Cup and Olympic Games are included in win–loss records.

=== Singles ===
Tournament	2022	2023	2024	W–L
Grand Slam tournaments
Australian Open	A	A	A	0–0
French Open	A	A	A	0–0
Wimbledon	Q1	A	A	0–0
US Open	A	A		0–0
Win–Loss	0–0	0–0	0–0	0–0
Career statistics
Year-end ranking (Note: 2016: WTA ranking - 562, 2017: WTA ranking - 394, 2018: WTA ranking - 262, 2019: WTA ranking - 1093, 2020: WTA ranking - 447, 2021: WTA ranking - 270.)	478	n/a		$328,749

=== Doubles ===
Current through the 2024 Linz Open.

Tournament	2020	2021	2022	2023	2024	2025	2026	SR	W–L	Win %
Grand Slam tournaments
Australian Open	A	A	A	3R	1R	A	2R	0 / 3	3–3	50%
French Open	A	A	A	2R	2R	A	1R	0 / 3	2–3	40%
Wimbledon	A	A	A	3R (Note: Withdrawal during the tournament is not counted as a loss.)	2R	1R	2R	0 / 4	4–3	75%
US Open	A	A	A	2R	A	1R	1R	0 / 3	1–3	25%
Win–Loss	0–0	0–0	0–0	6–3	2–3	0–2	2–4	0 / 13	10–12	50%
WTA 1000 tournaments
Qatar Open	A	NTI	A	NTI	A	A	A	0 / 0	0–0	–
Dubai Championships	NTI	A	NTI	A	A	A	A	0 / 0	0–0	–
Indian Wells Open	NH	A	A	1R	A	A	A	0 / 1	0–1	0%
Miami Open	NH	A	A	A	A	A	A	0 / 0	0–0	–
Madrid Open	NH	A	A	A	A	A	2R	0 / 1	0–1	0%
Italian Open	A	A	A	1R	A	A	1R	0 / 2	0–2	0%
Canadian Open	NH	A	A	A	A	A	A	0 / 0	0–0	–
Cincinnati Open	A	A	A	A	A	A	A	0 / 0	0–0	–
China Open	Not Held			1R	A	A	1R	0 / 2	0–2	0%
Wuhan Open	Not Held				A	A	A	0 / 0	0–0	–
Guadalajara Open	Not Held		A	1R	Not Tier I			0 / 1	0–1	0%
Win–Loss	0–0	0–0	0–0	0–4	0–0	0–0	0–3	0 / 7	0–7	0%
Career statistics
	2020	2021	2022	2023	2024	2025	2026	SR	W–L	Win %
Tournaments	1	1	2	21	3		0	Career total: 28		
Titles	0	0	1	0	0			Career total: 1		
Finals	0	0	1	1	0			Career total: 2		
Hard Win–Loss	0–0	0–1	0–1	8–10	1–4			0 / 15	9–16	36%
Clay Win–Loss	0–1	0–0	4–0	8–7				1 / 9	12–8	60%
Grass Win–Loss	0–0	0–0	0–0	3–3				0 / 4	3–3	50%
Overall Win–Loss	0–1	0–1	4–1	19–20	1–4			1 / 28	24–27	47%
Win %	0%	0%	80%	49%	20%			Career total: 47%		
Year-end ranking (Note: 2015: WTA ranking - 404, 2016: WTA ranking - 998, 2017: WTA ranking - 581, 2018: WTA ranking - 345, 2019: WTA ranking - 858.)	525	215	74	57	92	66				

== WTA Tour finals ==
=== Doubles: 6 (2 titles, 4 runner-ups) ===
Legend WTA 500 (0–1) WTA 250 (2–3)	Finals by surface Hard (0–1) Clay (2–2) Grass (0–1)	Finals by setting Outdoors (1–3) Indoors (1–1)

Result	W–L	Date	Tournament	Tier	Surface	Partner	Opponents	Score
Win	1–0	Oct 2022	Emilia-Romagna Open, Italy	WTA 250	Clay	(Czech Republic) Anastasia Dețiuc	(Netherlands) Arantxa Rus (Slovenia) Tamara Zidanšek	1–6, 6–3, [10–8]
Loss	1–1	Jul 2023	Hamburg European Open, Germany	WTA 250	Clay	(United States) Angela Kulikov	(Kazakhstan) Anna Danilina; Alexandra Panova	4–6, 2–6
Loss	1–2	Apr 2026	Linz Open, Austria	WTA 500	Clay (i)	(Czech Republic) Jesika Malečková	(Romania) Sorana Cîrstea (China) Zhang Shuai	3–6, 2–6
Win	2–2	Apr 2026	Open de Rouen, France	WTA 250	Clay (i)	(Czech Republic) Jesika Malečková	(Chinese Taipei) Liang En-shuo (China) Tang Qianhui	6–2, 7–5
Loss	2–3	Jul 2026	Eastbourne International, UK	WTA 250	Grass	(Czech Republic) Jesika Malečková	(Brazil) Luisa Stefani (Canada) Gabriela Dabrowski	1–6, 4–6
Loss	2–4	Oct 2026	Japan Women's Open, Japan	WTA 250	Hard	(Czech Republic) Jesika Malečková	(Indonesia) Janice Tjen (Australia) Storm Hunter	4–6, 1–6

== WTA 125 finals ==
=== Doubles: 15 (8 titles, 7 runner-ups) ===
Result	W–L	Date	Tournament	Surface	Partner	Opponents	Score
Loss	0–1	Dec 2022	Open Angers, France	Hard (i)	(Czech Republic) Markéta Vondroušová	(United States) Alycia Parks (China) Zhang Shuai	2–6, 2–6
Win	1–1	Apr 2024	Solgironès Open, Spain	Clay	(Czech Republic) Anna Sisková	(Hungary) Tímea Babos (Hungary) Dalma Gálfi	walkover
Loss	1–2	Jun 2024	Veneto Open, Italy	Grass	(Czech Republic) Anna Sisková	(United States) Hailey Baptiste (United States) Alycia Parks	6–7^{(4–7)}, 2–6
Loss	1–3	Mar 2025	Antalya Challenger, Turkey	Clay	(Czech Republic) Jesika Malečková	(Poland) Maja Chwalińska (Czech Republic) Anastasia Dețiuc	6–4, 3–6, [2–10]
Win	2–3	May 2025	Parma Ladies Open, Italy	Clay	(Czech Republic) Jesika Malečková	(China) Tang Qianhui (United States) Sabrina Santamaria	6–2, 6–0
Win	3–3	Jun 2025	Makarska Open, Croatia	Clay	(Czech Republic) Jesika Malečková	(Georgia (country)) Oksana Kalashnikova; Elena Pridankina	2–6, 6–3, [10–4]
Win	4–3	Jul 2025	Båstad Open, Sweden	Clay	(Czech Republic) Jesika Malečková	(Spain) Irene Burillo Escorihuela (Turkey) Berfu Cengiz	6–4, 6–3
Win	5–3	Sep 2025	Ljubljana Open, Slovenia	Clay	(Switzerland) Simona Waltert	(Slovenia) Dalila Jakupović (Slovenia) Nika Radišić	6–2, 6–2
Win	6–3	Sep 2025	Tolentino Open, Italy	Clay	(Czech Republic) Jesika Malečková	(Italy) Silvia Ambrosio (Italy) Nuria Brancaccio	6–3, 3–6, [10–8]
Win	7–3	Oct 2025	Mallorca Championships, Spain	Clay	(Czech Republic) Jesika Malečková	(Germany) Noma Noha Akugue (Germany) Mariella Thamm	6–4, 6–0
Win	8–3	Oct 2025	Internazionali di Rovereto, Italy	Hard (i)	(Czech Republic) Jesika Malečková	(Italy) Silvia Ambrosio (Italy) Aurora Zantedeschi	6–0, 4–6, [10–4]
Loss	8–4	Dec 2025	Open Angers, France	Hard (i)	(Czech Republic) Jesika Malečková	(Germany) Tamara Korpatsch (France) Jessika Ponchet	3–6, 2–6
Loss	8–5	Mar 2026	Antalya Challenger, Turkey	Clay	(Czech Republic) Jesika Malečková	(France) Estelle Cascino (Argentina) Nicole Fossa Huergo	5–7, 6–7^{(6–8)}
Loss	8–6	Mar 2026	Dubrovnik Open, Croatia	Clay	(Czech Republic) Jesika Malečková	(Czech Republic) Anastasia Dețiuc (Czech Republic) Dominika Šalková	5–7, 4–6
Loss	8–7	Aug 2026	Philly Open, United States	Hard	(Czech Republic) Jesika Malečková	(Netherlands) Isabelle Haverlag (Slovenia) Nika Radišić	2–6, 6–1, [7–10]

== ITF Circuit finals ==
=== Singles: 20 (7 titles, 13 runner-ups) ===
Legend $40,000 tournaments $25,000 tournaments (2–4) $10/15,000 tournaments (5–9)	Finals by surface Hard (2–1) Clay (5–10) Carpet (0–2)

Result	W–L	Date	Tournament	Tier	Surface	Opponent	Score
Loss	0–1	Aug 2016	ITF Pörtschach, Austria	10,000	Clay	(Slovakia) Lenka Juríková	1–6, 2–6
Loss	0–2	Aug 2016	ITF Prague, Czech Republic	10,000	Clay	(Czech Republic) Petra Krejsová	5–7, 6–7^{(4–7)}
Loss	0–3	Sep 2016	ITF Říčany, Czech Republic	10,000	Clay	(Germany) Katharina Gerlach	5–7, 2–6
Win	1–3	Sep 2016	ITF Brno, Czech Republic	10,000	Clay	(Czech Republic) Diana Šumová	6–3, 3–6, 6–4
Loss	1–4	Nov 2016	ITF Ramat Gan, Israel	10,000	Hard	(Israel) Deniz Khazaniuk	5–7, 3–6
Loss	1–5	Mar 2017	ITF Heraklion, Greece	15,000	Clay	(Ukraine) Olga Ianchuk	3–6, 2–6
Loss	1–6	Jun 2017	Přerov Cup, Czech Republic	15,000	Clay	(Slovakia) Lenka Juríková	4–6, 4–6
Loss	1–7	Jul 2017	Bella Cup Toruñ, Poland	25,000	Clay	(Slovakia) Chantal Škamlová	2–6, 6–4, 3–6
Win	2–7	Sep 2017	ITF Prague, Czech Republic	15,000	Clay	(Slovenia) Nastja Kolar	6–2, 5–7, 6–4
Win	3–7	Dec 2017	ITF Milovice, Czech Republic	15,000	Hard (i)	(France) Manon Arcangioli	6–3, 6–3
Win	4–7	Dec 2017	ITF Jablonec nad Nisou, Czech Republic	15,000	Hard (i)	(Switzerland) Susan Bandecchi	6–3, 6–4
Loss	4–8	Jan 2018	ITF Antalya, Turkey	15,000	Clay	(Romania) Andreea Roșca	6–7^{(6–8)}, 4–6
Loss	4–9	Apr 2018	ITF Óbidos, Portugal	25,000	Carpet	(Serbia) Ivana Jorović	1–6, 2–6
Win	5–9	Jun 2018	ITF Klosters, Switzerland	25,000	Clay	(Bulgaria) Isabella Shinikova	5–7, 6–4, 6–1
Loss	5–10	Aug 2018	ITF Koksijde, Belgium	25,000	Clay	(Netherlands) Richèl Hogenkamp	4–6, 1–6
Loss	5–11	Dec 2019	ITF Jablonec nad Nisou, Czech Republic	15,000	Carpet (i)	(Estonia) Elena Malõgina	4–6, 5–7
Win	6–11	Mar 2020	ITF Heraklion, Greece	15,000	Clay	(Spain) Rebeka Masarova	6–4, 6–4
Loss	6–12	Apr 2021	ITF Antalya, Turkey	15,000	Clay	(Romania) Andreea Roșca	5–7, 3–6
Win	7–12	May 2021	ITF Otočec, Slovenia	25,000	Clay	(Slovenia) Dalila Jakupović	6–0, 6–2
Loss	7–13	Aug 2021	ITF Radom, Poland	25,000	Clay	(Italy) Lucrezia Stefanini	6–4, 2–6, 3–6

=== Doubles: 36 (20 titles, 16 runner-ups) ===
Legend $100,000 tournaments (2–1) $75/80,000 tournaments (2–2) $50/60,000 tournaments (5–2) $25,000 tournaments (5–7) $10/15,000 tournaments (6–4)	Finals by surface Hard (7–6) Clay (12–10)

Result	W–L	Date	Tournament	Tier	Surface	Partner	Opponents	Score
Win	1–0	May 2015	ITF Zielona Góra, Poland	10,000	Clay	(Czech Republic) Markéta Vondroušová	(Russia) Natela Dzalamidze (Russia) Margarita Lazareva	6–2, 6–2
Win	2–0	Jun 2015	Přerov Cup, Czech Republic	15,000	Clay	(Czech Republic) Markéta Vondroušová	(Czech Republic) Martina Borecká (Czech Republic) Jesika Malečková	6–4, 6–1
Loss	2–1	Aug 2015	ITF Prague Open, Czech Republic	75,000	Clay	(Czech Republic) Markéta Vondroušová	(Czech Republic) Kateřina Kramperová (United States) Bernarda Pera	6–7^{(4–7)}, 7–5, [1–10]
Loss	2–2	Sep 2016	ITF Prague, Czech Republic	10,000	Clay	(Czech Republic) Vendula Žovincová	(Romania) Laura Ioana Andrei (Germany) Sarah-Rebecca Sekulic	4–6, 2–6
Win	3–2	Jan 2017	ITF Stuttgart, Germany	15,000	Hard (i)	(Czech Republic) Markéta Vondroušová	(Bosnia and Herzegovina) Anita Husarić (Belgium) Kimberley Zimmermann	7–6^{(7–3)}, 7–5
Win	4–2	Jun 2017	Přerov Cup, Czech Republic	15,000	Clay	(Czech Republic) Dagmar Dudláková	(Czech Republic) Tereza Janatová (Czech Republic) Natálie Novotná	6–1, 6–3
Loss	4–3	Jul 2017	Bella Cup, Poland	25,000	Clay	(Czech Republic) Jesika Malečková	(Belarus) Vera Lapko (Russia) Anna Morgina	2–6, 3–6
Win	5–3	Sep 2018	Royal Cup, Montenegro	25,000	Clay	(Slovenia) Nina Potočnik	(Bosnia and Herzegovina) Nefisa Berberovic (Slovenia) Veronika Erjavec	2–6, 6–3, [10–0]
Loss	5–4	Oct 2018	Open de Touraine, France	25,000	Hard (i)	(Czech Republic) Jesika Malečková	(Poland) Magdalena Fręch (Netherlands) Bibiane Schoofs	7–5, 2–6, [3–10]
Loss	5–5	Feb 2019	Trnava Indoor, Slovakia	W25	Hard (i)	(Poland) Maja Chwalińska	(Romania) Laura Ioana Paar (Czech Republic) Anastasia Zarycká	4–6, 3–6
Loss	5–6	Jan 2020	ITF Monastir, Tunisia	W15	Hard	(Czech Republic) Jesika Malečková	(Italy) Nuria Brancaccio (Italy) Federica Rossi	7–5, 3–6, [5–10]
Win	6–6	Feb 2020	Trnava Indoor, Slovakia	W25	Hard (i)	(Romania) Laura Ioana Paar	(Russia) Victoria Kan (Ukraine) Ganna Poznikhirenko	6–1, 6–1
Loss	6–7	Mar 2020	ITF Heraklion, Greece	W15	Clay	(Slovakia) Chantal Škamlová	(Romania) Oana Gavrilă (Romania) Andreea Roșca	3–6, 6–4, [7–10]
Loss	6–8	Sep 2020	ITF Frýdek-Místek, Czech Republic	W25	Clay	(Czech Republic) Jesika Malečková	(Czech Republic) Anastasia Dețiuc (Czech Republic) Johana Marková	1–6, 4–6
Win	7–8	Feb 2021	ITF Potchefstroom, South Africa	W25	Hard	(Czech Republic) Jesika Malečková	(Hungary) Anna Bondár (Hungary) Réka Luca Jani	6–2, 3–6, [10–5]
Win	8–8	Mar 2021	ITF Antalya, Turkey	W15	Clay	(Czech Republic) Aneta Laboutková	(Russia) Darya Astakhova (Slovenia) Nika Radišić	6–3, 4–6, [10–6]
Loss	8–9	Apr 2021	ITF Antalya, Turkey	W15	Clay	(Czech Republic) Lucie Havlíčková	(South Korea) Lee So-ra (Japan) Misaki Matsuda	2–6, 3–6
Win	9–9	Sep 2021	ITF Prague Open, Czech Republic	W60	Clay	(Czech Republic) Jesika Malečková	(Japan) Kanako Morisaki (Japan) Erika Sema	6–3, 1–6, [10–2]
Loss	9–10	Sep 2021	ITF Frýdek-Místek, Czech Republic	W25	Clay	(Czech Republic) Anna Sisková	(Japan) Kanako Morisaki (Japan) Erika Sema	3–6, 1–6
Loss	9–11	Oct 2021	ITF Lagos, Portugal	W25	Hard	(Czech Republic) Jesika Malečková	(Latvia) Diāna Marcinkēviča (China) Yuan Yue	w/o
Loss	9–12	Oct 2021	ITF Istanbul, Turkey	W25	Hard (i)	(Poland) Maja Chwalińska	(Netherlands) Jasmijn Gimbrère (Netherlands) Bibiane Schoofs	2–6, 4–6
Win	10–12	Feb 2022	ITF Antalya, Turkey	W25	Clay	(Czech Republic) Jesika Malečková	(Japan) Funa Kozaki (Japan) Naho Sato	7–6^{(7–2)}, 7–6^{(7–4)}
Win	11–12	Mar 2022	ITF Antalya, Turkey	W15	Clay	(Czech Republic) Jesika Malečková	(Greece) Sapfo Sakellaridi; Anastasia Zolotareva	6–2, 6–4
Win	12–12	Apr 2022	Chiasso Open, Switzerland	W60	Clay	(Czech Republic) Anastasia Dețiuc	(Spain) Aliona Bolsova; Oksana Selekhmeteva	6–3, 1–6, [10–8]
Loss	12–13	Apr 2022	ITF Prague Open, Czech Republic	W60	Clay	(Czech Republic) Jesika Malečková	(Chile) Bárbara Gatica (Brazil) Rebeca Pereira	4–6, 2–6
Win	13–13	Aug 2022	Přerov Cup, Czech Republic	W60	Clay	(Czech Republic) Anastasia Dețiuc	(Japan) Funa Kozaki (Japan) Misaki Matsuda	7–6^{(7–4)}, 4–6, [10–5]
Win	14–13	Sep 2022	ITF Frýdek-Místek, Czech Republic	W25	Clay	(Czech Republic) Dominika Šalková	(Japan) Funa Kozaki (Japan) Misaki Matsuda	6–2, 6–3
Win	15–13	Oct 2022	Hamburg Ladies & Gents Cup, Germany	W60	Hard (i)	(Czech Republic) Jesika Malečková	(Slovenia) Veronika Erjavec (Norway) Malene Helgø	6–4, 6–2
Win	16–13	Oct 2022	Internationaux de Poitiers, France	W80	Hard (i)	(Czech Republic) Markéta Vondroušová	(France) Jessika Ponchet (Czech Republic) Renata Voráčová	6–4, 6–3
Win	17–13	Nov 2022	GB Pro-Series Shrewsbury, United Kingdom	W100	Hard (i)	(Czech Republic) Markéta Vondroušová	(France) Jessika Ponchet (Czech Republic) Renata Voráčová	7–6^{(7–4)}, 6–2
Win	18–13	Apr 2024	Zaragoza Open, Spain	W100	Clay	(Czech Republic) Anna Sisková	(Italy) Angelica Moratelli (Italy) Camilla Rosatello	6–2, 6–3
Loss	18–14	Aug 2024	Ladies Open Amstetten, Austria	W75	Clay	(Czech Republic) Jesika Malečková	(Spain) Yvonne Cavallé Reimers (Netherlands) Eva Vedder	3–6, 2–6
Loss	18–15	Nov 2024	Pétange Open, Luxembourg	W75	Hard (i)	(Czech Republic) Jesika Malečková	(Russia) Alevtina Ibragimova (Netherlands) Lian Tran	6–1, 2–6, [9–11]
Win	19–15	Feb 2025	ITF Prague Open, Czech Republic	W75	Hard (i)	(Czech Republic) Jesika Malečková	(Australia) Priscilla Hon (Switzerland) Rebeka Masarova	6–0, 6–2
Win	20–15	Feb 2025	Trnava Indoor, Slovakia	W75	Hard (i)	(Czech Republic) Jesika Malečková	(Switzerland) Céline Naef (Russia) Elena Pridankina	5–7, 6–3, [10–2]
Loss	20–16	Apr 2025	Wiesbaden Open, Germany	W100	Clay	(Czech Republic) Jesika Malečková	(Kazakhstan) Zhibek Kulambayeva (Latvia) Darja Semeņistaja	6–4, 3–6, [9–11]

== Junior finals ==
=== Grand Slam tournaments ===
==== Doubles: 2 (2 titles) ====
Result	Year	Tournament	Surface	Partner	Opponents	Score
Win	2015	Australian Open	Hard	(Czech Republic) Markéta Vondroušová	(Germany) Katharina Hobgarski (Belgium) Greet Minnen	7–5, 6–4
Win	2015	French Open	Clay	(Czech Republic) Markéta Vondroušová	(United States) Caroline Dolehide (United States) Katerina Stewart	6–0, 6–3

=== ITF Junior Circuit ===
==== Singles (5–1) ====
Legend
Grade 1 / B1 (1–0)
Grade 2 (2–1)
Grade 3 (0–0)
Grade 4 (1–0)
Grade 5 (1–0)

Result	W–L	Date	Tournament	Tier	Surface	Opponent	Score
Win	1–0	Jun 2013	ITF Bytom, Poland	Grade 4	Clay	(Czech Republic) Petra Melounová	6–3, 2–6, 6–4
Win	2–0	Jul 2013	ITF Veska, Czech Republic	Grade 5	Clay	(Russia) Sabina Shaydullina	6–4, 6–2
Loss	2–1	May 2014	ITF Villach, Austria	Grade 2	Clay	(Russia) Sofya Zhuk	6–4, 1–6, 6–7^{(5–7)}
Win	3–1	Jun 2014	ITF Budapest, Hungary	Grade 2	Clay	(Hungary) Dalma Gálfi	6–1, 6–1
Win	4–1	Jul 2014	ITF Plzeň, Czech Republic	Grade 2	Clay	(Sweden) Fanny Östlund	6–1, 6–2
Win	5–1	Mar 2015	ITF Umag, Croatia	Grade 1	Clay	(Russia) Aleksandra Pospelova	6–3, 6–2

==== Doubles (14–1) ====
Legend
Grade A (3–1)
Grade 1 / B1 (3–0)
Grade 2 (4–0)
Grade 3 (0–0)
Grade 4 (3–0)
Grade 5 (1–0)

Result	W–L	Date	Tournament	Tier	Surface	Partner	Opponents	Score
Win	1–0	Jul 2012	ITF Prague, Czech Republic	Grade 4	Clay	(Czech Republic) Vendula Zovincová	(Czech Republic) Marie Bouzková (Belgium) Magali Kempen	w/o
Win	2–0	Sep 2012	ITF Veli Lošinj, Croatia	Grade 4	Clay	(Czech Republic) Vendula Zovincová	(Romania) Jaqueline Cristian (Croatia) Lana Slavica	6–4, 6–3
Win	3–0	Jul 2013	ITF Veska, Czech Republic	Grade 5	Clay	(Czech Republic) Tereza Kolarová	(Slovakia) Nikola Dolaková (Poland) Zofia Stanisz	6–4, 6–3
Win	4–0	Jan 2014	ITF Prague, Czech Republic	Grade 4	Hard	(Czech Republic) Gabriela Knutson	(Czech Republic) Vendula Zovincová (Russia) Maria Novikova	6–3, 2–6, [10–6]
Win	5–0	May 2014	ITF Villach, Austria	Grade 2	Clay	(Slovakia) Jana Jablonovská	(Slovenia) Manca Pislak (Slovenia) Tamara Zidanšek	6–4, 6–2
Win	6–0	Jun 2014	ITF Budapest, Hungary	Grade 2	Clay	(Slovakia) Jana Jablonovská	(Czech Republic) Tereza Kolarova (Hungary) Dalma Gálfi	6–0, 6–3
Win	7–0	Jun 2014	ITF Offenbach, Germany	Grade 1	Clay	(Slovenia) Nina Potočnik	(Brazil) Luisa Stefani (Belarus) Iryna Shymanovich	3–6, 7–6^{(7–1)}, [10–5]
Win	8–0	Jul 2014	ITF Plzeň, Czech Republic	Grade 2	Clay	(Slovakia) Jana Jablonovská	(Czech Republic) Tereza Kolarová (Slovakia) Tereza Mihalíková	6–3, 7–5
Loss	8–1	Dec 2014	ITF Plantation, United States	Grade A	Clay	(Slovakia) Tereza Mihalíková	(Czech Republic) Markéta Vondroušová (United States) CiCi Bellis	5–7, 6–2, [4–10]
Win	9–1	Jan 2015	ITF Bratislava, Slovakia	Grade 2	Carpet	(Czech Republic) Markéta Vondroušová	(Czech Republic) Karolina Novotná (Czech Republic) Anna Slovaková	6–1, 6–3
Win	10–1	Jan 2015	Australian Open, Australia	Grade A	Hard	(Czech Republic) Markéta Vondroušová	(Germany) Katharina Hobgarski (Belgium) Greet Minnen	7–5, 6–4
Win	11–1	May 2015	Trofeo Bonfiglio, Italy	Grade A	Clay	(Czech Republic) Markéta Vondroušová	(Hungary) Dalma Gálfi (United Kingdom) Katie Swan	3–6, 6–2, [10–2]
Win	12–1	Jun 2015	French Open, France	Grade A	Clay	(Czech Republic) Markéta Vondroušová	(United States) Caroline Dolehide (United States) Katerina Stewart	6–0, 6–3
Win	13–1	Jul 2015	ITF Roehampton, UK	Grade 1	Grass	(Czech Republic) Markéta Vondroušová	(Australia) Destanee Aiava (Australia) Olivia Tjandramulia	6–3, 6–3
Win	14–1	Jul 2015	ITF Klosters, Switzerland	Grade B1	Clay	(Czech Republic) Markéta Vondroušová	(Hungary) Dalma Gálfi (Hungary) Fanny Stollár	6–4, 7–5
