= Anastasia Dețiuc =

Czech-Moldovan tennis player (born 1998)

- Country (sports): Czech Republic (from 26 Feb 2018); Moldova (until 11 Feb 2018)
- Born: 14 December 1998 (age 27) Chișinău, Moldova
- Height: 1.78 m (5 ft 10 in)
- Plays: Right (two-handed backhand)
- Prize money: US$ 442,784

Singles
- Career record: 170–113
- Career titles: 3 ITF
- Highest ranking: No. 352 (3 February 2020)

Doubles
- Career record: 264–183
- Career titles: 3 WTA, 3 WTA 125
- Highest ranking: No. 57 (27 July 2026)
- Current ranking: No. 60 (12 October 2026)

Grand Slam doubles results
- French Open: 3R (2024)
- Wimbledon: 3R (2026)
- US Open: 1R (2023, 2025, 2026)

Team competitions
- Fed Cup: 3–1
- Last updated on: 12 October 2026.

Anastasia Dețiuc (born 14 December 1998) is a Czech-Moldovan tennis player who has specialized in doubles. She has a career-high WTA doubles ranking of No. 57, achieved on 27 July 2026. On the ITF Junior Circuit, she had a career-high combined ranking of No. 22, achieved January 2016.

Playing for Moldova Fed Cup team, Dețiuc had a win–loss record of 3–1.

In February 2018, she switched nationalities to represent the Czech Republic.

== Career ==
=== 2022–2023: Maiden WTA Tour doubles title ===
Partnering Miriam Kolodziejová, Dețiuc won her first WTA Tour doubles title at the 2022 Emilia-Romagna Open, defeating Arantxa Rus and Tamara Zidanšek in the final.

She made her major debut at the 2023 French Open with Andrea Gámiz as an alternate pair, but lost in the first round to American team Alycia Parks and Peyton Stearns. Dețiuc competed at the 2023 Wimbledon Championships, also with Andrea Gámiz as an alternate pair, and recorded her first major win over wildcard entrants Freya Christie and Ali Collins.

At the 2023 US Open, partnering with Lauren Davis, she lost in the first round to eventual champions Gabriela Dabrowski and Erin Routliffe, after winning the first set.

=== 2024–2025: French Open third round ===
In May, Dețiuc won her first WTA 125 doubles title with Amina Anshba at the 2024 Open de Saint-Malo, defeating Estelle Cascino and Carole Monnet in the final.

She entered the 2024 French Open also with Anshba, as an alternate pair, and recorded her first win at this major over Jaqueline Cristian and Ana Bogdan, and sixth seeds Lyudmyla Kichenok and Jeļena Ostapenko, before losing to 11th seeds and eventual finalists, Jasmine Paolini and Sara Errani.

Dețiuc and Yulia Starodubtseva entered the 2025 French Open doubles draw from the alternative list and reached the second round, at which point they lost to tenth seeds Tímea Babos and Luisa Stefani.

=== 2026: Wimbledon third round, second career title ===
Teaming up with Sabrina Santamaria, Dețiuc won her second career doubles title at the 2026 Ostrava Open, overcoming wildcard entrants Lucie Havlíčková and Dominika Šalková in the final.

== Performance timeline ==
Key
W	F	SF	QF	#R	RR	Q#	P#	DNQ	A	Z#	PO	G	S	B	NMS	NTI	P	NH

(W) winner; (F) finalist; (SF) semifinalist; (QF) quarterfinalist; (#R) rounds 4, 3, 2, 1; (RR) round-robin stage; (Q#) qualification round; (P#) preliminary round; (DNQ) did not qualify; (A) absent; (Z#) Davis/Fed Cup Zonal Group (with number indication) or (PO) play-off; (G) gold, (S) silver or (B) bronze Olympic/Paralympic medal; (NMS) not a Masters tournament; (NTI) not a Tier I tournament; (P) postponed; (NH) not held; (SR) strike rate (events won / competed); (W–L) win–loss record.
To avoid confusion and double counting, these charts are updated at the conclusion of a tournament or when the player's participation has ended.

Only main-draw results in WTA Tour, Grand Slam tournaments, Billie Jean King Cup, United Cup, Hopman Cup and Olympic Games are included in win–loss records.

=== Doubles ===
Current through the 2026 China Open.

Tournament	2014	...	2021	2022	2023	2024	2025	2026	SR	W–L	Win %
Grand Slam tournaments
Australian Open	A		A	A	A	A	A	A	0 / 0	0–0	–
French Open	A		A	A	1R	3R	2R	2R	0 / 4	4–4	50%
Wimbledon	A		A	A	2R	A	2R	3R	0 / 3	4–3	57%
US Open	A		A	A	1R	A	1R	1R	0 / 3	0–3	0%
Win–Loss	0–0		0–0	0–0	1–3	2–1	2–3	3–3	0 / 10	8–10	44%
WTA 1000 tournaments
Madrid Open	A		A	A	A	A	A	1R	0 / 1	0–1	0%
Cincinnati Open	A		A	A	A	A	A	1R	0 / 1	0–1	0%
China Open	A		A	A	A	A	A	1R	0 / 1	0–1	0%
Win–Loss	0–0		0–0	0–0	0–0	0–0	0–0	0–3	0 / 3	0–3	0%
Career statistics
Tournaments	0 (Note: During the season, she did not play in the main draw of any WTA Tour-level tournaments. However, she played at the Billie Jean King Cup, which is not counted as a played tournament but as matches counted.)		3	6	17	6	13	17	Career total: 62		
Titles	0		0	1	0	0	0	2	Career total: 3		
Finals	0		0	1	1	0	0	2	Career total: 4		
Overall Win–Loss	1–0		1–3	7–4	8–17	3–6	10–13	19–15	3 / 62	49–58	46%
Year-end ranking (Note: 2016: WTA ranking - 1073, 2017: WTA ranking - 841, 2018: WTA ranking - 448, 2019: WTA ranking - 166, 2020: WTA ranking - 157.)	n/a		169	81	99	105	79		$442,784		

== WTA Tour finals ==
=== Doubles: 4 (3 titles, 1 runner-up) ===
Legend WTA 250 (2–1)	Finals by surface Hard (1–0) Clay (1–1)

Result	W–L	Date	Tournament	Tier	Surface	Partner	Opponents	Score
Win	1–0	Oct 2022	Parma Open, Italy	WTA 250	Clay	(Czech Republic) Miriam Škoch	(Netherlands) Arantxa Rus (Slovenia) Tamara Zidanšek	1–6, 6–3, [10–8]
Loss	1–1	Jul 2023	Ladies Open Lausanne, Switzerland	WTA 250	Clay	Amina Anshba	(Hungary) Anna Bondár (France) Diane Parry	2–6, 1–6
Win	2–1	Feb 2026	Ostrava Open, Czech Republic	WTA 250	Hard (i)	(United States) Sabrina Santamaria	(Czech Republic) Lucie Havlíčková (Czech Republic) Dominika Šalková	6–4, 7–6^{(7–4)}
Win	3–1	Jul 2026	Iași Open, Romania	WTA 250	Clay	Irina Khromacheva	(Armenia) Alina Charaeva (Kazakhstan) Zhibek Kulambayeva	4–6, 6–2, [10–5]

== WTA 125 finals ==
=== Doubles: 7 (3 titles, 4 runner-ups) ===
Result	W–L	Date	Tournament	Surface	Partner	Opponents	Score
Loss	0–1	Jul 2023	Contrexéville Open, France	Clay	Amina Anshba	(Spain) Cristina Bucșa; Alena Fomina-Klotz	6–4, 3–6, [7–10]
Win	1–1	May 2024	Open de Saint-Malo, France	Clay	Amina Anshba	(France) Carole Monnet (France) Estelle Cascino	7–6^{(9–7)}, 2–6, [10–5]
Win	2–1	Mar 2025	Antalya Challenger, Turkey	Clay	(Poland) Maja Chwalińska	(Czech Republic) Jesika Malečková (Czech Republic) Miriam Škoch	4–6, 6–3, [10–2]
Loss	2–2	Mar 2025	Antalya Challenger 2, Turkey	Clay	(Poland) Maja Chwalińska	(Switzerland) Simona Waltert (Argentina) María Lourdes Carlé	6–3, 5–7, [3–10]
Loss	2–3	Apr 2025	Oeiras Ladies Open, Portugal	Clay	(Romania) Patricia Maria Țig	(Portugal) Francisca Jorge (Portugal) Matilde Jorge	1–6, 2–6
Win	3–3	Mar 2026	Dubrovnik Open, Croatia	Clay	(Czech Republic) Dominika Šalková	(Czech Republic) Jesika Malečková (Czech Republic) Miriam Škoch	7–5, 6–4
Loss	3–4	May 2026	İstanbul Open, Turkey	Clay	(Japan) Makoto Ninomiya	Maria Kozyreva (Brazil) Laura Pigossi	4–6, 6–4, [7–10]

== ITF Circuit finals ==
=== Singles: 5 (3 titles, 2 runner-ups) ===
Result	W–L	Date	Tournament	Tier	Surface	Opponent	Score
Loss	0–1	Nov 2017	ITF Heraklion, Greece	15,000	Clay	(Germany) Tayisiya Morderger	5–7, 2–6
Win	1–1	Feb 2018	Trnava Indoor, Slovakia	15,000	Hard (i)	(Russia) Sofya Lansere	5–7, 6–0, 6–3
Loss	1–2	Mar 2018	ITF Heraklion, Greece	15,000	Clay	(Romania) Raluca Șerban	3–6, 7–5, 2–6
Win	2–2	Mar 2018	ITF Heraklion, Greece	15,000	Clay	(Hungary) Anna Bondár	6–3, 6–2
Win	3–2	Mar 2019	ITF Sharm El Sheikh, Egypt	W15	Hard	(Belarus) Shalimar Talbi	2–6, 7–6^{(7–5)}, 6–1

=== Doubles: 32 (19 titles, 13 runner-ups) ===
Legend
W100 tournaments (2–0)
W60/75 tournaments (5–4)
W25 tournaments (9–4)
W15 tournaments (3–5)

Result	W–L	Date	Tournament	Tier	Surface	Partner	Opponents	Score
Loss	0–1	Sep 2017	ITF Prague, Czech Republic	15K	Clay	(Czech Republic) Johana Marková	(Czech Republic) Kristýna Hrabalová (Czech Republic) Nikola Tomanová	1–6, 3–6
Win	1–1	Sep 2017	ITF Prague, Czech Republic	15K	Clay	(Czech Republic) Johana Marková	(Ukraine) Nadiya Kolb (Germany) Natalie Pröse	6–2, 6–2
Loss	1–2	Nov 2017	ITF Heraklion, Greece	15K	Clay	(Russia) Elina Nepliy	(Germany) Tayisiya Morderger (Germany) Yana Morderger	2–6, 6–7^{(9–11)}
Loss	1–3	Feb 2018	Trnava Indoor, Slovakia	15K	Hard (i)	(Czech Republic) Johana Marková	(Poland) Paulina Czarnik (Poland) Daria Kuczer	3–6, 5–7
Loss	1–4	Sep 2018	ITF Brno, Czech Republic	15K	Clay	(Canada) Petra Januskova	(Czech Republic) Kristýna Hrabalová (Czech Republic) Nikola Tomanová	2–6, 4–6
Win	2–4	Feb 2019	ITF Sharm El Sheikh, Egypt	W15	Hard	(Finland) Oona Orpana	(Croatia) Mariana Drazic (Norway) Malene Helgø	6–0, 6–4
Loss	2–5	Apr 2019	ITF Andijan, Uzbekistan	W25	Hard	(Russia) Amina Anshba	(Hong Kong) Eudice Chong (Serbia) Tamara Čurović	2–6, 3–6
Loss	2–6	Jun 2019	ITF Minsk, Belarus	W25	Clay	(Russia) Amina Anshba	(Norway) Ulrikke Eikeri (Italy) Martina Colmegna	6–1, 4–6, [6–10]
Win	3–6	Jul 2019	Reinert Open Versmold, Germany	W60	Clay	(Russia) Amina Anshba	(India) Ankita Raina (Netherlands) Bibiane Schoofs	0–6, 6–3, [10–8]
Win	4–6	Jul 2019	ITS Cup Olomouc, Czech Republic	W25	Clay	(Czech Republic) Johana Marková	(Czech Republic) Jesika Malečková (Slovakia) Chantal Škamlová	6–3, 4–6, [11–9]
Win	5–6	Jul 2019	ITF Moscow, Russia	W25	Clay	(Russia) Amina Anshba	(Belarus) Ilona Kremen (Russia) Ekaterina Makarova	6–2, 6–4
Win	6–6	Sep 2019	ITF Prague, Czech Republic	W25	Clay	(Czech Republic) Johana Marková	(Russia) Ekaterina Kazionova (Russia) Anastasiya Komardina	6–1, 6–3
Win	7–6	Sep 2019	Royal Cup, Montenegro	W25	Clay	(Russia) Amina Anshba	(Finland) Anastasia Kulikova (Russia) Evgeniya Levashova	2–6, 6–3, [10–7]
Loss	7–7	Oct 2019	ITF Pula, Italy	W25	Clay	(Russia) Amina Anshba	(Japan) Eri Hozumi (Japan) Yuki Naito	4–6, 6–7
Win	8–7	Oct 2019	ITF Pula, Italy	W25	Clay	(Russia) Amina Anshba	(Switzerland) Ylena In-Albon (Italy) Giorgia Marchetti	7–5, 6–1
Loss	8–8	Feb 2020	Trnava Indoor, Slovakia	W25	Hard (i)	(Russia) Amina Anshba	(Hungary) Anna Bondár (Slovakia) Tereza Mihalíková	4–6, 4–6
Win	9–8	Sep 2020	ITF Prague, Czech Republic	W25	Clay	(Czech Republic) Johana Marková	(United States) Sofia Sewing (United States) Katie Volynets	6–2, 6–1
Win	10–8	Sep 2020	ITF Frýdek-Místek, Czech Republic	W25	Clay	(Czech Republic) Johana Marková	(Czech Republic) Miriam Kolodziejová (Czech Republic) Jesika Malečková	6–1, 6–4
Loss	10–9	Mar 2021	ITF Antalya, Turkey	W15	Clay	(Czech Republic) Darja Viďmanová	(Germany) Sina Herrmann (South Korea) Jang Su-jeong	w/o
Win	11–9	May 2021	ITF Heraklion, Greece	W15	Clay	(Netherlands) Lexie Stevens	(Russia) Darya Astakhova (Romania) Elena-Teodora Cadar	6–1, 4–6, [10–6]
Loss	11–10	Jun 2021	Macha Lake Open, Czech Republic	W60	Clay	(Russia) Amina Anshba	(Greece) Valentini Grammatikopoulou (Netherlands) Richèl Hogenkamp	3–6, 4–6
Win	12–10	Jun 2021	ITF Klosters, Switzerland	W25	Clay	(Russia) Amina Anshba	(Switzerland) Jenny Dürst (Poland) Weronika Falkowska	3–6, 6–1, [10–3]
Loss	12–11	Jul 2021	Amstelveen Open, Netherlands	W60	Clay	(Russia) Amina Anshba	(Netherlands) Suzan Lamens (Netherlands) Quirine Lemoine	4–6, 3–6
Win	13–11	Jan 2022	ITF Manacor, Spain	W25	Hard	(Russia) Yana Sizikova	(Netherlands) Quirine Lemoine (Netherlands) Bibiane Schoofs	6–2, 6–3
Win	14–11	Apr 2022	Chiasso Open, Switzerland	W60	Clay	(Czech Republic) Miriam Kolodziejova	(Spain) Aliona Bolsova (Russia) Oksana Selekhmeteva	6–3, 1–6, [10–8]
Win	15–11	Apr 2022	Zagreb Ladies Open, Croatia	W60	Clay	(Ukraine) Katarina Zavatska	(North Macedonia) Lina Gjorcheska (Russia) Irina Khromacheva	6–4, 6–7^{(5–7)}, [11–9]
Win	16–11	Aug 2022	Zubr Cup Přerov, Czech Republic	W60	Clay	(Czech Republic) Miriam Kolodziejova	(Japan) Funa Kozaki (Japan) Misaki Matsuda	7–6^{(4)}, 4–6, [10–5]
Loss	16–12	Mar 2023	Trnava Indoor, Slovakia	W60	Hard (i)	(Russia) Amina Anshba	(United Kingdom) Olivia Nicholls (United Kingdom) Alicia Barnett	3–6, 3–6
Win	17–12	May 2023	Empire Slovak Open, Slovakia	W100	Clay	(Russia) Amina Anshba	(France) Estelle Cascino (Netherlands) Suzan Lamens	6–3, 4–6, [10–4]
Win	18–12	Jun 2024	Macha Lake Open, Czech Republic	W75	Clay	(Poland) Maja Chwalińska	(China) Feng Shuo (Greece) Sapfo Sakellaridi	6–3, 2–6, [10–6]
Loss	18–13	Nov 2024	Trnava Indoor, Slovakia	W75	Hard (i)	(Czech Republic) Aneta Kučmová	(United Kingdom) Madeleine Brooks (Netherlands) Isabelle Haverlag	6–7^{(5–7)}, 1–6
Win	19–13	Dec 2024	Dubai Tennis Challenge, UAE	W100	Hard	(Russia) Anastasia Tikhonova	(Netherlands) Isabelle Haverlag (Russia) Elena Pridankina	6–3, 6–7^{(7–9)}, [10–8]
