= Monica Niculescu career statistics =

Detailed career statistics of female tennis player

Career finals
Discipline	Type	Won	Lost	Total
Singles	Grand Slam	–	–	–
Singles	WTA Finals	–	–	–
Singles	WTA 1000	–	–	–
Singles	WTA Tour	3	5	8
Singles	Olympics	–	–	–
Singles	Total	3	5	8
Doubles	Grand Slam	0	1	1
Doubles	WTA Finals	–	–	–
Doubles	WTA 1000	0	3	3
Doubles	WTA Tour	12	19	29
Doubles	Olympics	–	–	–
Doubles	Total	12	23	35

This is a list of the main career statistics of professional Romanian tennis player Monica Niculescu.

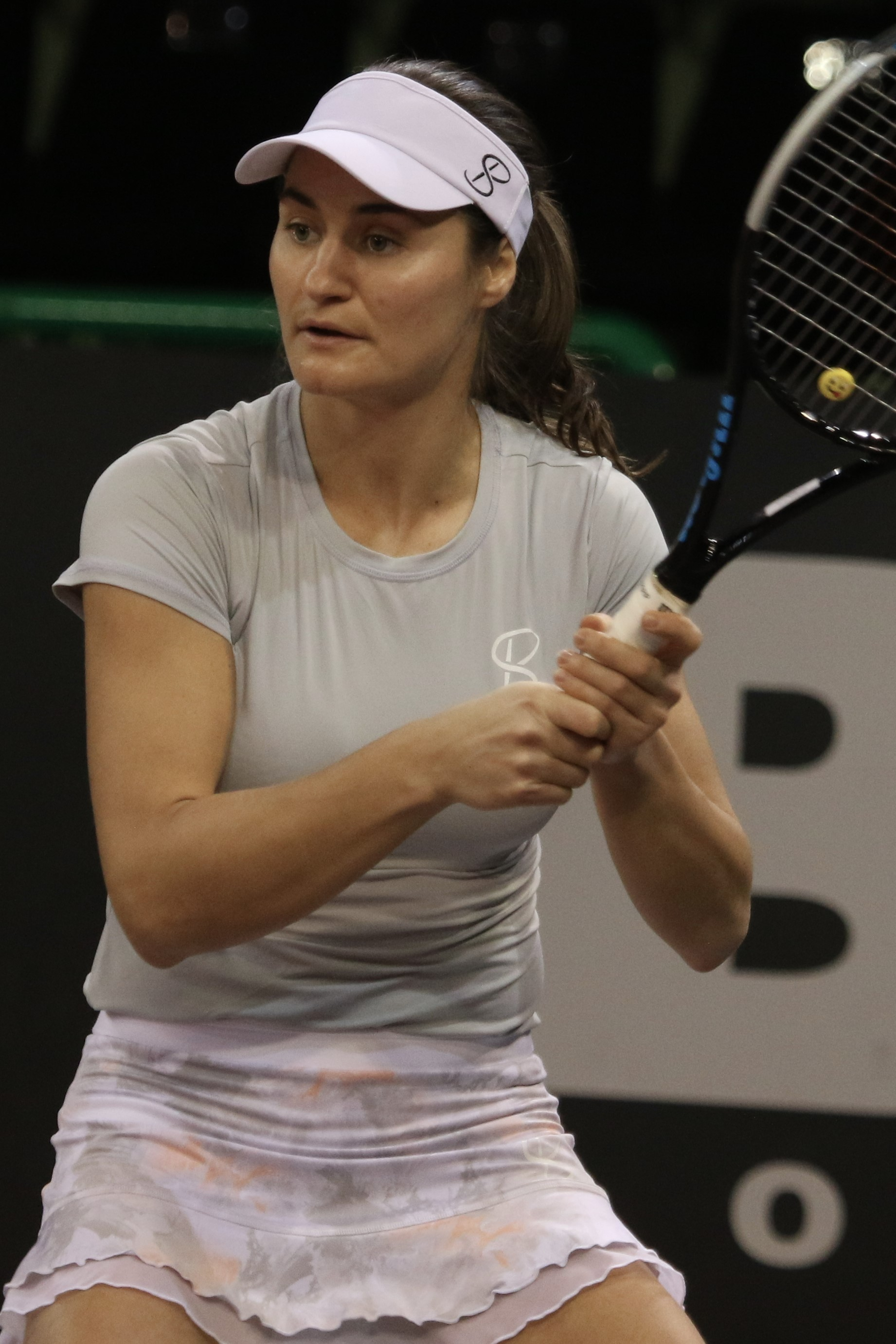
Romanian tennis player Monica Niculescu at the 2021 Open de Limoges.

== Performance timelines ==
Key
W	F	SF	QF	#R	RR	Q#	P#	DNQ	A	Z#	PO	G	S	B	NMS	NTI	P	NH

(W) winner; (F) finalist; (SF) semifinalist; (QF) quarterfinalist; (#R) rounds 4, 3, 2, 1; (RR) round-robin stage; (Q#) qualification round; (P#) preliminary round; (DNQ) did not qualify; (A) absent; (Z#) Davis/Fed Cup Zonal Group (with number indication) or (PO) play-off; (G) gold, (S) silver or (B) bronze Olympic/Paralympic medal; (NMS) not a Masters tournament; (NTI) not a Tier I tournament; (P) postponed; (NH) not held; (SR) strike rate (events won / competed); (W–L) win–loss record.
To avoid confusion and double counting, these charts are updated at the conclusion of a tournament or when the player's participation has ended.

Only main-draw results in WTA Tour, Grand Slam tournaments, Fed Cup/Billie Jean King Cup and Olympic Games are included in win–loss records.

=== Singles ===
Current through the 2022 French Open.

Tournament	2006	2007	2008	2009	2010	2011	2012	2013	2014	2015	2016	2017	2018	2019	2020	2021	2022	SR	W–L	Win %
Grand Slam tournaments
Australian Open	A	A	1R	2R	1R	3R	3R	1R	3R	1R	2R	1R	1R	1R	1R	Q1	A	0 / 13	8–13	38%
French Open	A	A	1R	1R	Q3	1R	1R	1R	2R	1R	1R	1R	A	A	1R	Q3	A	0 / 10	1–10	9%
Wimbledon	A	A	2R	1R	2R	2R	1R	1R	1R	4R	2R	1R	1R	2R	NH	1R	A	0 / 13	8–13	38%
US Open	A	A	1R	1R	1R	4R	1R	1R	2R	2R	3R	3R	1R	1R	A	Q3	A	0 / 12	9–12	43%
Win–loss	0–0	0–0	1–4	1–4	1–3	6–4	2–4	0–4	4–4	4–4	4–4	2–4	0–3	1–3	0–2	0–1	0–0	0 / 48	26–48	35%
National representation
Summer Olympics	NH		A	NH			A	NH			2R	NH				A		0 / 0	1–0	100%
WTA 1000
Dubai / Qatar Open (Note: The first Premier 5 event of the year has switched back and forth between the Dubai Tennis Championships and the Qatar Ladies Open since 2009. Dubai was classified as a Premier 5 event from 2009 to 2011 before being succeeded by Doha for the 2012–2014 period. In 2015, Dubai regained its Premier 5 status while Doha was demoted to Premier status. The Premier 5 tournaments were reclassified as WTA 1000 tournaments in 2021.)	NMS		2R	2R	A	Q2	QF	2R	3R	1R	3R	A	3R	Q2	A	Q1	A	0 / 8	12–8	60%
Indian Wells Open	A	A	A	1R	Q1	2R	2R	2R	2R	2R	3R	2R	1R	Q1	NH	A	A	0 / 9	6–9	40%
Miami Open	A	A	A	1R	A	2R	2R	1R	1R	2R	4R	1R	3R	3R	NH	Q1	A	0 / 10	8–10	44%
Madrid Open	NH			1R	A	1R	1R	Q1	1R	Q2	1R	1R	A	A	NH	A	A	0 / 6	0–6	0%
Italian Open	A	A	2R	1R	A	A	1R	1R	Q2	Q2	1R	1R	A	A	A	A	A	0 / 6	1–6	14%
Canadian Open	A	A	2R	1R	1R	Q2	A	A	A	A	2R	A	1R	A	NH	A		0 / 5	2–5	29%
Cincinnati Open	NMS			A	2R	1R	A	2R	Q2	Q1	Q1	Q1	Q1	A	A	A		0 / 3	2–3	40%
Pan Pacific / Wuhan Open (Note: In 2014, the Pan Pacific Open was downgraded to a Premier event and replaced by the Wuhan Open. The Premier 5 tournaments were reclassified as WTA 1000 tournaments in 2021.)	A	A	A	A	A	A	1R	A	A	2R	A	1R	1R	A	NH			0 / 4	1–4	20%
China Open	NMS			A	Q1	SF	2R	2R	1R	1R	Q2	2R	Q1	Q1	NH			0 / 6	7–6	54%
Career statistics
Career	2006	2007	2008	2009	2010	2011	2012	2013	2014	2015	2016	2017	2018	2019	2020	2021	2022	SR	W–L	Win %
Tournaments	0	1	15	22	9	15	23	22	20	21	20	19	15	11	2	3	0	Career total: 218		
Titles	0	0	0	0	0	0	0	1	1	0	1	0	0	0	0	0	0	Career total: 3		
Finals	0	0	0	0	0	1	1	1	1	1	2	1	0	0	0	0	0	Career total: 8		
Overall win–loss	0–0	0–1	8–15	10–22	6–9	21–15	15–23	22–21	22–19	20–21	26–20	11–20	9–14	8–10	0–2	0–3	0–0	3 / 218	178–215	45%
Year-end ranking	222	179	47	101	83	30	58	60	47	39	39	100	78	116	144	267		$6,525,428		

=== Doubles ===
Current after the 2023 Dubai Open.

Tournament	2006	2007	2008	2009	2010	2011	2012	2013	2014	2015	2016	2017	2018	2019	2020	2021	2022	2023	SR	W–L	Win%
Grand Slam tournaments
Australian Open	A	A	A	2R	3R	2R	QF	3R	2R	2R	1R	1R	SF	3R	3R	1R	A	3R	0 / 14	21–14	60%
French Open	A	A	2R	3R	QF	3R	2R	3R	2R	1R	A	A	A	A	2R	3R	2R	1R	0 / 12	16–12	57%
Wimbledon	A	A	2R	3R	2R	2R	2R	1R	2R	2R	1R	F	3R	3R	NH	2R	1R	1R	0 / 15	18–15	55%
US Open	A	A	2R	3R	3R	1R	1R	1R	2R	2R	3R	3R	2R	1R	A	QF	1R	1R	0 / 15	15–15	50%
Win–loss	0–0	0–0	3–3	7–4	8–4	4–4	5–4	4–4	4–4	3–4	2–3	7–3	7–3	4–3	3–2	6–4	1–3	2–4	0 / 56	70–56	56%
Olympic Games
Summer Olympics	NH		A	NH			A	NH			1R	NH				2R	NH		0 / 2	1–2	33%
WTA 1000
Dubai / Qatar Open	NMS		QF	QF	A	2R	1R	A	QF	QF	2R	A	A	1R	A	2R	1R	QF	0 / 11	12–11	52%
Indian Wells Open	A	A	A	QF	1R	1R	2R	1R	1R	2R	2R	1R	QF	2R	NH	A	QF	1R	0 / 2	10–13	43%
Miami Open	A	A	A	1R	2R	2R	SF	1R	2R	QF	SF	1R	1R	QF	NH	1R	1R	2R	0 / 14	14–14	50%
Madrid Open	NH			2R	A	1R	2R	A	2R	1R	1R	2R	A	A	NH	1R	A	QF	0 / 9	6–9	40%
Italian Open	A	A	A	A	A	A	1R	QF	2R	2R	SF	1R	A	A	2R	1R	1R	2R	0 / 10	9–10	47%
Canadian Open	A	A	1R	1R	SF	2R	A	A	A	A	F	2R	1R	A	A	A	2R	1R	0 / 10	10–10	50%
Cincinnati Open	A	A	1R	SF	QF	1R	A	1R	1R	1R	QF	F	1R	A	NH	A	1R	A	0 / 10	11–10	52%
Pan Pacific / Wuhan Open	A	A	A	A	A	A	1R	A	1R	F	A	A	2R (Note: Niculescu and her doubles partner withdrew during tournament, that is not counted as loss.)	A	NH				0 / 4	4–3	57%
China Open	NMS			A	A	1R	1R	A	A	1R	2R	2R	2R	1R	NH			2R	0 / 8	4–8	33%
Career statistics
Titles	0	0	0	1	0	0	1	0	2	0	3	1	0	1	0	1	0	0	Career total: 10		
Finals	0	0	1	2	2	1	3	1	3	3	5	3	0	2	1	2	2	0	Career total: 31		
Overall win–loss	0–0	3–2	15–16	28–20	28–18	16–20	28–18	10–16	26–16	24–18	32–14	22–15	11–9	19–11	10–6	21–15	21–18	7–5	10 /	321–237	58%
Win %	–	60%	48%	58%	61%	44%	61%	38%	62%	57%	70%	59%	55%	63%	63%	58%	55%	60%	Career total: 58%		
Year-end ranking	159	131	35	30	30	50	27	70	38	33	19	23	48	47	53	39	47	41			

=== Mixed doubles ===
Tournament	2009	2010	2011	2012	...	2022	W–L
Australian Open	A	1R	1R	A		A	0–2
French Open	A	1R	A	A		A	0–1
Wimbledon	2R	2R	A	1R			2–3
US Open	1R	A	A	A			0–1
Win–loss	1–2	1–3	0–1	0–1			2–7

== Grand Slam tournament finals ==
=== Doubles: 1 (runner-up) ===
Result	Year	Championship	Surface	Partner	Opponents	Score
Loss	2017	Wimbledon	Grass	(Chinese Taipei) Chan Hao-ching	(Russia) Ekaterina Makarova (Russia) Elena Vesnina	0–6, 0–6

== Other significant finals ==
=== Premier-Mandatory/Premier-5 tournaments ===
==== Doubles: 3 (3 runner-ups) ====
Result	Year	Tournament	Surface	Partner	Opponents	Score
Loss	2015	Wuhan Open	Hard	(Romania) Irina-Camelia Begu	(Switzerland) Martina Hingis (India) Sania Mirza	2–6, 3–6
Loss	2016	Canadian Open	Hard	(Romania) Simona Halep	(Russia) Ekaterina Makarova (Russia) Elena Vesnina	3–6, 6–7^{(5–7)}
Loss	2017	Cincinnati Open	Hard	(Chinese Taipei) Hsieh Su-wei	(Chinese Taipei) Chan Yung-jan (Switzerland) Martina Hingis	6–4, 4–6, [7–10]

== WTA Tour finals ==
=== Singles: 8 (3 titles, 5 runner-ups) ===
Legend
Grand Slam
WTA 1000
WTA 500
WTA 250 (3–5)

Result	W–L	Date	Tournament	Tier	Surface	Opponent	Score
Loss	0–1	Oct 2011	Luxembourg Open, Luxembourg	International (Note: The WTA International tournaments were reclassified as WTA 250 tournaments in 2021.)	Hard (i)	(Belarus) Victoria Azarenka	2–6, 2–6
Loss	0–2	Oct 2012	Luxembourg Open, Luxembourg	International	Hard (i)	(United States) Venus Williams	2–6, 3–6
Win	1–2	Mar 2013	Brasil Tennis Cup, Brazil	International	Hard	(Russia) Olga Puchkova	6–2, 4–6, 6–4
Win	2–2	Sep 2014	Guangzhou Open, China	International	Hard	(France) Alizé Cornet	6–4, 6–0
Loss	2–3	Jun 2015	Nottingham Open, United Kingdom	International	Grass	(Croatia) Ana Konjuh	6–1, 4–6, 2–6
Loss	2–4	Sep 2016	Korea Open, South Korea	International	Hard	(Spain) Lara Arruabarrena	0–6, 6–2, 0–6
Win	3–4	Oct 2016	Luxembourg Open, Luxembourg	International	Hard (i)	(Czech Republic) Petra Kvitová	6–4, 6–0
Loss	3–5	Jan 2017	Hobart International, Australia	International	Hard	(Belgium) Elise Mertens	3–6, 1–6

=== Doubles: 38 (12 titles, 26 runner-ups) ===
Legend
Grand Slam (0–1)
WTA 1000 (0–3)
WTA 500 (3–6)
WTA 250 (9–16)

Result	W–L	Date	Tournament	Tier	Surface	Partner	Opponents	Score
Loss	0–1	Aug 2008	Connecticut Open, United States	Tier II (Note: The WTA Tier II tournaments were reclassified as WTA Premier tournaments in 2009 and later as WTA 500 tournaments in 2021.)	Hard	(Romania) Sorana Cîrstea	(Czech Republic) Květa Peschke (United States) Lisa Raymond	6–4, 5–7, [7–10]
Win	1–1	Jul 2009	Budapest Grand Prix, Hungary	International	Clay	(Russia) Alisa Kleybanova	(Ukraine) Alona Bondarenko (Ukraine) Kateryna Bondarenko	6–4, 7–6^{(7–5)}
Loss	1–2	Aug 2009	Bank of the West Classic, United States	Premier	Hard	(Chinese Taipei) Chan Yung-jan	(United States) Serena Williams (United States) Venus Williams	1–6, 4–6
Loss	1–3	Jan 2010	Hobart International, Australia	International	Hard	(Chinese Taipei) Chan Yung-jan	(Czech Republic) Květa Peschke (Chinese Taipei) Chuang Chia-jung	6–3, 3–6, [7–10]
Loss	1–4	Jul 2010	Prague Open, Czech Republic	International	Clay	(Hungary) Ágnes Szávay	(Switzerland) Timea Bacsinszky (Italy) Tathiana Garbin	5–7, 6–7^{(4–7)}
Loss	1–5	Jul 2011	Baku Cup, Azerbaijan	International	Hard	(Kazakhstan) Galina Voskoboeva	(Ukraine) Mariya Koryttseva (Belarus) Tatiana Poutchek	3–6, 6–2, [8–10]
Win	2–5	Jan 2012	Hobart International, Australia	International	Hard	(Romania) Irina-Camelia Begu	(Chinese Taipei) Chuang Chia-jung (New Zealand) Marina Erakovic	6–7^{(4–7)}, 7–6^{(7–4)}, [10–5]
Loss	2–6	Sep 2012	Guangzhou Open, China	International	Hard	(Australia) Jarmila Gajdošová	(Thailand) Tamarine Tanasugarn (China) Zhang Shuai	6–2, 2–6, [8–10]
Loss	2–7	Oct 2012	Luxembourg Open, Luxembourg	International	Hard (i)	(Romania) Irina-Camelia Begu	(Czech Republic) Andrea Hlaváčková (Czech Republic) Lucie Hradecká	3–6, 4–6
Loss	2–8	Jun 2013	Eastbourne International, United Kingdom	Premier	Grass	(Czech Republic) Klára Koukalová	(Russia) Nadia Petrova (Slovenia) Katarina Srebotnik	3–6, 3–6
Win	3–8	Jan 2014	Shenzhen Open, China	International	Hard	(Czech Republic) Klára Koukalová	(Ukraine) Lyudmyla Kichenok (Ukraine) Nadiia Kichenok	6–3, 6–4
Win	4–8	Jan 2014	Hobart International, Australia (2)	International	Hard	(Czech Republic) Klára Koukalová	(United States) Lisa Raymond (China) Zhang Shuai	6–2, 6–7^{(5–7)}, [10–8]
Loss	4–9	Apr 2014	Katowice Open, Poland	International	Hard (i)	(Czech Republic) Klára Koukalová	(Ukraine) Yuliya Beygelzimer (Ukraine) Olga Savchuk	4–6, 7–5, [7–10]
Loss	4–10	Jan 2015	Hobart International, Australia	International	Hard	(Russia) Vitalia Diatchenko	(Netherlands) Kiki Bertens (Sweden) Johanna Larsson	5–7, 3–6
Loss	4–11	Oct 2015	Wuhan Open, China	Premier 5 (Note: The WTA Premier 5 & Mandatory tournaments were reclassified as WTA 1000 tournaments in 2021.)	Hard	(Romania) Irina-Camelia Begu	(Switzerland) Martina Hingis (India) Sania Mirza	2–6, 3–6
Loss	4–12	Oct 2015	Kremlin Cup, Russia	Premier	Hard (i)	(Romania) Irina-Camelia Begu	(Russia) Daria Kasatkina (Russia) Elena Vesnina	3–6, 7–6^{(9–7)}, [5–10]
Win	5–12	Jan 2016	Shenzhen Open, China (2)	International	Hard	(United States) Vania King	(China) Xu Yifan (China) Zheng Saisai	6–1, 6–4
Win	6–12	Jul 2016	Washington Open, United States	International	Hard	(Belgium) Yanina Wickmayer	(Japan) Shuko Aoyama (Japan) Risa Ozaki	6–4, 6–3
Loss	6–13	Jul 2016	Canadian Open, Canada	Premier 5	Hard	(Romania) Simona Halep	(Russia) Ekaterina Makarova (Russia) Elena Vesnina	3–6, 6–7^{(5–7)}
Win	7–13	Aug 2016	Connecticut Open, United States	Premier	Hard	(India) Sania Mirza	(Ukraine) Kateryna Bondarenko (Chinese Taipei) Chuang Chia-jung	7–5, 6–4
Loss	7–14	Oct 2016	Luxembourg Open, Luxembourg	International	Hard (i)	(Romania) Patricia Maria Țig	(Netherlands) Kiki Bertens (Sweden) Johanna Larsson	6–4, 5–7, [9–11]
Win	8–14	Apr 2017	Open Biel Bienne, Switzerland	International	Hard (i)	(Chinese Taipei) Hsieh Su-wei	(Switzerland) Timea Bacsinszky (Switzerland) Martina Hingis	5–7, 6–3, [10–7]
Loss	8–15	Jul 2017	Wimbledon, United Kingdom	Grand Slam	Grass	(Chinese Taipei) Chan Hao-ching	(Russia) Ekaterina Makarova (Russia) Elena Vesnina	0–6, 0–6
Loss	8–16	Aug 2017	Cincinnati Open, United States	Premier 5	Hard	(Chinese Taipei) Hsieh Su-wei	(Chinese Taipei) Chan Yung-jan (Switzerland) Martina Hingis	6–4, 4–6, [7–10]
Win	9–16	Feb 2019	Hua Hin Championships, Thailand	International	Hard	(Romania) Irina-Camelia Begu	(Russia) Anna Blinkova (China) Wang Yafan	2–6, 6–1, [12–10]
Loss	9–17	Aug 2019	Bronx Open, United States	International	Hard	(Russia) Margarita Gasparyan	(Croatia) Darija Jurak (Spain) María José Martínez Sánchez	5–7, 6–2, [7–10]
Loss	9–18	Aug 2020	Prague Open, Czech Republic	International	Clay	(Romania) Raluca Olaru	(Czech Republic) Lucie Hradecká (Czech Republic) Kristýna Plíšková	2–6, 2–6
Loss	9–19	Mar 2021	Qatar Ladies Open, Qatar	WTA 500	Hard	(Latvia) Jeļena Ostapenko	(United States) Nicole Melichar (Netherlands) Demi Schuurs	2–6, 6–2, [8–10]
Win	10–19	Oct 2021	Astana Open, Kazakhstan	WTA 250	Hard (i)	(Germany) Anna-Lena Friedsam	(Russia) Angelina Gabueva (Russia) Anastasia Zakharova	6–2, 4–6, [10–5]
Loss	10–20	May 2022	Grand Prix Lalla Meryem, Morocco	WTA 250	Clay	Alexandra Panova	(Japan) Eri Hozumi (Japan) Makoto Ninomiya	7–6^{(9–7)}, 3–6, [8–10]
Loss	10–21	Jun 2022	Nottingham Open, United Kingdom	WTA 250	Grass	(United States) Caroline Dolehide	(Brazil) Beatriz Haddad Maia (China) Zhang Shuai	6–7^{(2–7)}, 3–6
Loss	10–22	Jun 2023	Bad Homburg Open, Germany	WTA 250	Grass	(Japan) Eri Hozumi	(Brazil) Ingrid Martins; Lidziya Marozava	0–6, 6–7^{(3–7)}
Loss	10–23	Aug 2023	Washington Open, United States	WTA 500	Hard	(Chile) Alexa Guarachi	(Germany) Laura Siegemund; Vera Zvonareva	4–6, 4–6
Win	11–23	May 2024	Internationaux de Strasbourg, France	WTA 500	Clay	(Spain) Cristina Bucșa	(United States) Asia Muhammad (Indonesia) Aldila Sutjiadi	3–6, 6-4, [10-6]
Win	12–23	Aug 2024	Monterrey Open, Mexico	WTA 500	Hard	(China) Guo Hanyu	Alexandra Panova (Mexico) Giuliana Olmos	3-6, 6-3, [10-4]
Loss	12–24	Oct 2024	Japan Women's Open, Japan	WTA 250	Hard	(Spain) Cristina Bucșa	(Germany) Laura Siegemund (Japan) Ena Shibahara	6-3, 2-6, [2-10]
Loss	12–25	Jan 2025	Hobart International, Australia	WTA 250	Hard	(Hungary) Fanny Stollár	(China) Xinyu Jiang (Taiwan) Wu Fang-Hsien	1–6, 6–7
Loss	12–26	Nov 2025	Chennai Open, India	WTA 250	Hard	(Australia) Storm Hunter	(Indonesia) Aldila Sutjiadi (Indonesia) Janice Tjen	5–7, 4–6

== WTA Challenger finals ==
=== Singles: 1 (title) ===
Result	W–L	Date	Tournament	Surface	Opponent	Score
Win	1–0	Nov 2017	WTA 125 Limoges, France	Hard (i)	(Germany) Antonia Lottner	6–4, 6–2

=== Doubles: 7 (4 titles, 3 runner-ups) ===
Result	W–L	Date	Tournament	Surface	Partner	Opponents	Score
Loss	0–1	Dec 2021	WTA 125 Angers, France	Hard (i)	(Russia) Vera Zvonareva	(Slovakia) Tereza Mihalíková (Belgium) Greet Minnen	6–4, 1–6, [8–10]
Win	1–1	Dec 2021	WTA 125 Limoges, France	Hard (i)	(Russia) Vera Zvonareva	(France) Estelle Cascino (France) Jessika Ponchet	6–4, 6–4
Loss	1–2	Jul 2023	WTA 125 Iași, Romania	Clay	(Romania) Irina Bara	(Slovenia) Veronika Erjavec (Slovenia) Dalila Jakupović	4–6, 4–6
Win	2–2	Dec 2023	WTA 125 Angers, France	Hard (i)	(Spain) Cristina Bucsa	(Kazakhstan) Anna Danilina; Alexandra Panova	6–1, 6–3
Loss	2–3	May 2024	WTA 125 Paris, France	Clay	(China) Zhu Lin	(Indonesia) Aldila Sutjiadi (United States) Asia Muhammad	6–7, 6–4, [9–11]
Win	3–3	Oct 2024	Hong Kong 125 Open, China SAR	Hard	(Romania) Elena-Gabriela Ruse	(Japan) Nao Hibino (Japan) Makoto Ninomiya	6-3, 5-7, [10–5]
Win	4-3	Dec 2024	Open Angers Arena Loire, France	Hard	(Romania) Elena-Gabriela Ruse	(Switzerland) Belinda Bencic (Switzerland) Celine Naef	6-3 6-4

== ITF Circuit finals ==
=== Singles: 24 (19 titles, 5 runner–ups) ===
Legend $100,000 tournaments (3–2) $50,000 tournaments (1–0) $25,000 tournaments (6–3) $10,000 tournaments (9–0)	Finals by surface Hard (9–2) Clay (9–3) Grass (1–0) Carpet (0–0)

Result	W–L	Date	Tournament	Tier	Surface	Opponent	Score
Win	1–0	Aug 2002	ITF Bucharest, Romania	10,000	Clay	(Bulgaria) Tsvetana Pironkova	6–1, 7–6^{(4)}
Win	2–0	Apr 2003	ITF Cavtat, Croatia	10,000	Clay	(Croatia) Darija Jurak	6–4, 6–1
Win	3–0	Aug 2003	ITF Timișoara, Romania	10,000	Clay	(Spain) Veronica Rizhik	6–2, 6–3
Win	4–0	Feb 2004	ITF Albufeira, Portugal	10,000	Hard	(Russia) Irina Kotkina	6–1, 3–6, 6–0
Win	5–0	Feb 2004	ITF Portimão, Portugal	10,000	Hard	(Croatia) Nadja Pavić	6–4, 7–6^{(4)}
Win	6–0	May 2004	ITF Bucharest, Romania	10,000	Clay	(Romania) Simona Matei	6–2, 6–2
Win	7–0	Aug 2004	ITF Iași, Romania	10,000	Clay	(Romania) Raluca Olaru	7–6^{(5)}, 6–0
Win	8–0	Mar 2005	ITF Cairo, Egypt	10,000	Clay	(Russia) Galina Fokina	6–4, 6–2
Win	9–0	Mar 2005	ITF Ain Sokhna, Egypt	10,000	Clay	(Slovakia) Magdaléna Rybáriková	6–3, 6–4
Win	10–0	May 2005	ITF Antalya, Turkey	25,000	Clay	(Belarus) Ekaterina Dzehalevich	6–2, 6–2
Win	11–0	Aug 2005	ITF Coimbra, Portugal	25,000	Hard	(France) Aravane Rezaï	6–3, 6–1
Loss	11–1	Jul 2006	ITF Stuttgart, Germany	25,000	Clay	(Ukraine) Yevgenia Savranska	6–7^{(4)}, 5–7
Loss	11–2	Jul 2006	ITF Darmstadt, Germany	25,000	Clay	(Romania) Magda Mihalache	0–6, 1–6
Loss	11–3	Aug 2006	ITF Coimbra, Portugal	25,000	Hard	(Republic of Ireland) Kelly Liggan	0–6, 6–7^{(7)}
Win	12–3	Sep 2007	ITF Granada, Spain	25,000	Hard	(Spain) María Martínez Sánchez	6–3, 6–4
Win	13–3	Oct 2007	ITF Istanbul, Turkey	25,000	Hard (i)	(Ukraine) Oxana Lyubtsova	6–2, 6–0
Win	14–3	Nov 2007	ITF Port Pirie, Australia	25,000	Hard	(Chinese Taipei) Hwang I-hsuan	6–1, 6–2
Win	15–3	Nov 2007	ITF Mount Gambier, Australia	25,000	Hard	(South Korea) Lee Ye-ra	6–3, 6–1
Loss	15–4	Nov 2008	ITF Warsaw, Poland	100,000	Hard (i)	(United Kingdom) Anne Keothavong	6–7^{(4)}, 6–4, 3–6
Loss	15–5	Jul 2010	ITF Pétange, Luxembourg	100,000	Clay	(France) Mathilde Johansson	3–6, 3–6
Win	16–5	Nov 2012	ITF Nantes, France	50,000	Hard (i)	(Kazakhstan) Yulia Putintseva	6–2, 6–3
Win	17–5	Jun 2015	ITF Marseille, France	100,000	Clay	(France) Pauline Parmentier	6–2, 7–5
Win	18–5	Nov 2015	ITF Poitiers, France	100,000	Hard (i)	(France) Pauline Parmentier	7–5, 6–2
Win	19–5	Jun 2019	ITF Ilkley, United Kingdom	100,000	Grass	(Hungary) Tímea Babos	6–2, 4–6, 6–3

=== Doubles: 38 (22 titles, 16 runner–ups) ===
Legend $100,000 tournaments (3–4) $75,000 tournaments (1–1) $50,000 tournaments (1–0) $25,000 tournaments (6–6) $10,000 tournaments (11–5)	Finals by surface Hard (4–3) Clay (17–13) Grass (1–0)

Result	W–L	Date	Tournament	Tier	Surface	Partner	Opponents	Score
Loss	0–1	Aug 2002	ITF Bucharest, Romania	10,000	Clay	(Romania) Gabriela Niculescu	(Bulgaria) Radoslava Topalova (Bulgaria) Virginia Trifonova	4–6, 6–3, 3–6
Win	1–1	Aug 2002	ITF Bucharest, Romania	10,000	Clay	(Romania) Gabriela Niculescu	(Czech Republic) Iveta Gerlová (Germany) Nina Nittinger	6–2, 6–2
Loss	1–2	Mar 2003	ITF Makarska, Croatia	10,000	Clay	(Romania) Gabriela Niculescu	(Austria) Stefanie Haidner (Austria) Daniela Klemenschits	6–3, 6–7^{(7)}, 4–6
Win	2–2	Mar 2003	ITF Makarska, Croatia	10,000	Clay	(Romania) Gabriela Niculescu	(Croatia) Darija Jurak (Slovakia) Maria Jedlicková	6–2, 6–2
Loss	2–3	Apr 2003	ITF Dubrovnik, Croatia	10,000	Clay	(Romania) Gabriela Niculescu	(Bosnia and Herzegovina) Mervana Jugić-Salkić (Croatia) Darija Jurak	2–6, 6–4, 2–6
Loss	2–4	Aug 2003	ITF Bucharest, Romania	10,000	Clay	(Romania) Gabriela Niculescu	(Russia) Anna Bastrikova (Russia) Elena Vesnina	4–6, 4–6
Loss	2–5	Aug 2003	ITF Timișoara, Romania	10,000	Clay	(Romania) Gabriela Niculescu	(Hungary) Julia Ács (Russia) Vasilisa Davydova	4–6, 3–6
Win	3–5	May 2004	ITF Bucharest, Romania	10,000	Clay	(Romania) Gabriela Niculescu	(Romania) Lenore Lazaroiu (Romania) Andra Savu	6–4, 6–2
Win	4–5	Jul 2004	ITF Bucharest, Romania	10,000	Clay	(Romania) Mădălina Gojnea	(Romania) Liana Ungur (United States) Iris Ichim	6–4, 6–1
Win	5–5	Aug 2004	ITF Târgu Mureș, Romania	10,000	Clay	(Romania) Gabriela Niculescu	(Romania) Simona Matei (Hungary) Barbara Pócza	7–5, 6–1
Win	6–5	Aug 2004	ITF Iași, Romania	10,000	Clay	(Romania) Gabriela Niculescu	(Austria) Nadine Schlotterer (Czech Republic) Eva Valková	7–5, 6–1
Win	7–5	Mar 2005	ITF Cairo, Egypt	10,000	Clay	(Romania) Gabriela Niculescu	(Ukraine) Hanna Andreyeva (Ukraine) Valeria Bondarenko	6–2, 6–3
Win	8–5	Mar 2005	ITF Ain Sokhna, Egypt	10,000	Clay	(Romania) Gabriela Niculescu	(Romania) Laura-Ramona Husaru (Germany) Sarah Raab	6–1, 6–1
Loss	8–6	Apr 2005	ITF Civitavecchia, Italy	25,000	Clay	(Romania) Gabriela Niculescu	(Czech Republic) Lucie Hradecká (Czech Republic) Sandra Záhlavová	4–6, 3–6
Win	9–6	May 2005	ITF Antalya, Turkey	10,000	Clay	(Romania) Gabriela Niculescu	(Ukraine) Irina Buryachok (Russia) Olga Panova	6–3, 6–4
Win	10–6	May 2005	ITF Antalya, Turkey	25,000	Clay	(Romania) Gabriela Niculescu	(Czech Republic) Renata Kucerková (Germany) Kathrin Wörle	6–7^{(0)}, 6–0, 6–0
Loss	10–7	Oct 2005	ITF Sevilla, Spain	25,000	Clay	(Romania) Gabriela Niculescu	(Italy) Sara Errani (Spain) María Martínez Sánchez	2–6, 6–7^{(5)}
Loss	10–8	Apr 2006	ITF Athens, Greece	25,000	Clay	(Romania) Gabriela Niculescu	(Poland) Olga Brózda (Estonia) Margit Rüütel	6–2, 4–6, 2–6
Win	11–8	May 2006	ITF Bucharest, Romania	10,000	Clay	(Romania) Gabriela Niculescu	(Romania) Sorana Cîrstea (Romania) Diana Buzean	6–3, 6–0
Win	12–8	Jun 2006	ITF Bucharest, Romania	10,000	Clay	(Romania) Gabriela Niculescu	(Romania) Raluca Ciulei (Serbia) Neda Kozić	6–2, 6–1
Win	13–8	Jul 2006	ITF Stuttgart, Germany	25,000	Clay	(Czech Republic) Renata Voráčová	(Slovakia) Eva Fislová (Slovakia) Stanislava Hrozenská	6–2, 6–7^{(4)}, 7–5
Win	14–8	Jul 2006	ITF Darmstadt, Germany	25,000	Clay	(Ukraine) Yevgenia Savranska	(Austria) Daniela Klemenschits (Austria) Sandra Klemenschits	1–6, 6–0, 6–1
Win	15–8	Sep 2006	ITF Mestre, Italy	50,000	Clay	(Czech Republic) Renata Voráčová	(Georgia (country)) Margalita Chakhnashvili (Germany) Tatjana Malek	6–4, 3–6, 6–4
Win	16–8	Apr 2007	ITF Putignano, Italy	25,000	Hard	(Slovenia) Andreja Klepač	(United States) Jessica Kirkland (Germany) Carmen Klaschka	6–2, 7–5
Loss	16–9	Jul 2006	ITF Jounieh, Lebanon	75,000	Clay	(Romania) Mădălina Gojnea	(Belarus) Tatiana Poutchek (Belarus) Anastasiya Yakimova	7–5, 6–0
Win	17–9	Jul 2007	ITF Darmstadt, Germany	25,000	Clay	(Belarus) Ekaterina Dzehalevich	(United States) Hilary Barte (Germany) Tatjana Priachin	6–4, 7–5
Loss	17–10	Jul 2007	ITF Bucharest, Romania	25,000	Clay	(Belarus) Ekaterina Dzehalevich	(Romania) Sorana Cîrstea (Romania) Ágnes Szatmári	6–0, 4–6, ret.
Loss	17–11	Sep 2007	ITF Madrid, Spain	25,000	Clay	(Ukraine) Yevgenia Savranska	(Spain) María Martínez Sánchez (Spain) Arantxa Parra Santonja	6–1, 6–7^{(4)}
Loss	17–12	Jul 2007	ITF Granada, Spain	25,000	Clay	(Romania) Alexandra Dulgheru	(Spain) Marta Marrero (Spain) María Martínez Sánchez	4–6, 1–6
Win	18–12	Nov 2007	ITF Mount Gambier, Australia	25,000	Hard	(Germany) Antonia Matic	(Australia) Sophie Ferguson (Australia) Trudi Musgrave	5–7, 6–3, [10–8]
Win	19–12	Dec 2007	ITF Dubai, UAE	75,000	Hard	(New Zealand) Marina Erakovic	(Ukraine) Yuliana Fedak (Russia) Anna Lapushchenkova	7–6^{(1)}, 6–4
Loss	19–13	Oct 2008	ITF Poitiers, France	100,000	Hard (i)	(Uzbekistan) Akgul Amanmuradova	(Czech Republic) Petra Cetkovská (Czech Republic) Lucie Šafářová	4–6, 4–6
Loss	19–14	Oct 2008	ITF Trnava, Slovakia	100,000	Hard (i)	(Uzbekistan) Akgul Amanmuradova	(Czech Republic) Andrea Hlaváčková (Czech Republic) Lucie Hradecká	6–7^{(1)}, 1–6
Loss	19–15	Jul 2010	ITF Biarritz, France	100,000	Clay	(Spain) Lourdes Domínguez Lino	(Canada) Sharon Fichman (Germany) Julia Görges	5–7, 4–6
Win	20–15	Jul 2010	ITF Pétange, Luxembourg	100,000	Clay	(Canada) Sharon Fichman	(France) Sophie Lefèvre (France) Laura Thorpe	6–4, 6–2
Loss	20–16	Oct 2013	ITF Poitiers, France	100,000	Hard (i)	(United States) Christina McHale	(Czech Republic) Lucie Hradecká (Netherlands) Michaëlla Krajicek	6–7^{(5)}, 6–2
Win	21–16	Nov 2015	ITF Poitiers, France	100,000	Hard (i)	(Romania) Andreea Mitu	(France) Stéphanie Foretz (France) Amandine Hesse	6–7^{(5)}, 7–6^{(2)}, [10–8]
Win	22–16	Jun 2021	ITF Nottingham, United Kingdom	100,000	Grass	(Romania) Elena-Gabriela Ruse	(Australia) Priscilla Hon (Australia) Storm Sanders	7–5, 7–5

== WTA Tour career earnings ==
Current after the 2022 US Open

Year	Grand Slam titles (Note: Includes singles, doubles and mixed doubles titles.)	WTA titles	Total titles	Earnings ($)	Money list rank
2007	0	0	0	249,035	67
2008	0	0	0	249,035	67
2009	0	1	1	315,414	67
2010	0	0	0	251,188	77
2011	0	0	0	549,493	38
2012	0	1	1	450,393	45
2013	0	1	1	406,372	62
2014	0	3	3	582,694	44
2015	0	0	0	667,180	49
2016	0	3	3	789,710	41
2017	0	2	2	672,948	48
2018	0	0	0	496,099	73
2019	0	1	1	427,648	101
2020	0	0	0	211,457	119
2021	0	1	1	306,013	123
2022	0	0	0	105,114	253
2023	0	0	0	250,000	50
2024	0	0	0	155,00	
Career	0	13	13	6,630,542	98

== Wins against top 10 players ==
Season	2011	2012	...	2016	2017	Total
Wins	1	1		1	1	4

#	Player	Rank	Event	Surface	Rd	Score	MNR
2011
1.	(China) Li Na	No. 5	China Open	Hard	1R	6–4, 6–0	No. 57
2012
2.	(Russia) Vera Zvonareva	No. 8	Qatar Open	Hard	2R	7–5, 3–2, ret.	No. 31
2016
3.	(Czech Republic) Petra Kvitová	No. 9	Fed Cup, Romania	Hard (i)	RR	6–3, 6–4	No. 37
2017
4.	(United Kingdom) Johanna Konta	No. 7	China Open	Hard	1R	6–1, 6–2	No. 65
