= 2024 Open Angers Arena Loire =

- Date: 2 – 8 December
- Edition: 4th
- Category: WTA 125
- Draw: 32S / 8D
- Prize money: $115,000
- Surface: Hard (indoor)
- Location: Angers, France
- Venue: Arena Loire

Champions

Singles
- (United States) Alycia Parks

Doubles
- (Romania) Monica Niculescu / (Romania) Elena-Gabriela Ruse
| ← 2023 · | Open Angers Arena Loire | · 2025 → |

The 2024 Open In Arte Angers Loire Trélazé was a professional women's tennis tournament played on indoor hard courts. It was the 4th edition of the tournament and part of the 2024 WTA 125 tournaments, offering $115,000 in prize money. It took place in Angers, France from 2 to 8 December 2024.

== Champions ==
=== Singles ===
- (United States) Alycia Parks def. (Switzerland) Belinda Bencic 7–6^{(7–4)}, 3–6, 6–0.

=== Doubles ===
- (Romania) Monica Niculescu / (Romania) Elena-Gabriela Ruse def. (Switzerland) Belinda Bencic / (Switzerland) Céline Naef 6–3, 6–4

== Singles main draw entrants ==
=== Seeds ===
| Country | Player | Rank^{1} | Seed |
|---|---|---|---|
| FRA | Clara Burel | 73 | 1 |
| ESP | Nuria Párrizas Díaz | 97 | 2 |
| USA | Alycia Parks | 106 | 3 |
| | Anastasia Zakharova | 109 | 4 |
| ~~FRA~~ | ~~Chloé Paquet~~ | ~~111~~ | ~~5~~ |
| FRA | Océane Dodin | 113 | 6 |
| FRA | Jessika Ponchet | 124 | 7 |
| ROU | Elena-Gabriela Ruse | 128 | 8 |

- ^{1} Rankings as of 25 November 2024.

=== Other entrants ===
The following players received a wildcard into the singles main draw:

- (France) Julie Belgraver
- (Switzerland) Belinda Bencic
- (France) Sara Cakarevic
- (United States) Clervie Ngounoue

The following player received entry using a protected ranking:

- Margarita Gasparyan

The following players received entry from the qualifying draw:

- (Austria) Sinja Kraus
- (France) Carole Monnet
- (Turkey) İpek Öz
- (Romania) Patricia Maria Țig

The following player received entry as a lucky loser:

- (France) Yasmine Mansouri

=== Withdrawals ===
- (France) Chloé Paquet → replaced by (France) Yasmine Mansouri

== Doubles entrants ==
=== Seeds ===
| Country | Player | Country | Player | Rank^{1} | Seed |
|---|---|---|---|---|---|
| ROU | Monica Niculescu | ROU | Elena-Gabriela Ruse | 95 | 1 |
| GBR | Emily Appleton | GBR | Maia Lumsden | 171 | 2 |

- ^{1} Rankings as of 25 November 2024.

=== Other entrants ===
The following pair received a wildcard into the doubles main draw:

- (France) Elsa Jacquemot / (France) Séléna Janicijevic
