= 2024 Open Angers Arena Loire – Singles =

Singles
- 2024 Open Angers Arena Loire

Final
- Champion: (United States) Alycia Parks
- Runner-up: (Switzerland) Belinda Bencic
- Score: 7–6^{(7–4)}, 3–6, 6–0

Details
- Draw: 32 (4 Q / 4 WC)
- Seeds: 8

Events
Singles	Doubles
← 2023 ·	Open Angers Arena Loire	· 2025 →

Alycia Parks won the title at the 2024 Open Angers Arena Loire, defeating Belinda Bencic in the final; 7–6^{(7–4)}, 3–6, 6–0. It was her third WTA 125 title of the year.

Clara Burel was the defending champion, but lost in the second round to Mona Barthel.

== Seeds ==
1. (France) Clara Burel (second round)
2. (Spain) Nuria Párrizas Díaz (first round)
3. (United States) Alycia Parks (champion)
4. Anastasia Zakharova (first round)
5. (France) Chloé Paquet (withdrew)
6. (France) Océane Dodin (quarterfinals)
7. (France) Jessika Ponchet (first round)
8. (Romania) Elena-Gabriela Ruse (second round)

== Draw ==
=== Key ===
- Q = Qualifier
- WC = Wild card
- LL = Lucky loser
- Alt = Alternate
- SE = Special exempt
- PR = Protected ranking
- ITF = ITF entry
- JE = Junior exempt
- w/o = Walkover
- r = Retired
- d = Defaulted
- SR = Special ranking

=== Finals ===
Semifinals
(Germany) Mona Barthel	2	6	3
3	(United States) Alycia Parks	6	1	6
WC	(Switzerland) Belinda Bencic	6	6
(Czech Republic) Dominika Šalková	1	2

Final
3	(United States) Alycia Parks	7^{7}	3	6
WC	(Switzerland) Belinda Bencic	6^{4}	6	0

=== Top half ===
First round
1	(France) C Burel	7	6
(Switzerland) C Naef	5	3
(France) S Janicijevic	1	3
(Germany) M Barthel	6	6
(Czech Republic) B Palicová	6	6
(Japan) S Saito	4	4
WC	(United States) C Ngounoue	6	6
7	(France) J Ponchet	4	3
3	(United States) A Parks	6	6
WC	(France) J Belgraver	2	4
(Germany) T Korpatsch	6	6
(Germany) A-L Friedsam	3	3
WC	(France) S Cakarevic	1	7^{7}	1
(Andorra) V Jiménez Kasintseva	6	6^{5}	6
(France) E Jacquemot	6	4	7
LL	(France) Y Mansouri	3	6	5

Second round
1	(France) C Burel	2	6	3
(Germany) M Barthel	6	4	6
(Czech Republic) B Palicová	3	6	6
WC	(United States) C Ngounoue	6	1	2
3	(United States) A Parks	7^{7}	6
(Germany) T Korpatsch	6^{3}	2
(Andorra) V Jiménez Kasintseva	6	7^{7}
(France) E Jacquemot	3	6^{4}

Quarterfinals
(Germany) M Barthel	6	7
(Czech Republic) B Palicová	4	5
3	(United States) A Parks	7^{7}	6
(Andorra) V Jiménez Kasintseva	6^{4}	3

Semifinals
(Germany) M Barthel	2	6	3
3	(United States) A Parks	6	1	6

=== Bottom half ===
First round
6	(France) O Dodin	6	6
(Czech Republic) B Fruhvirtová	2	4
PR	M Gasparyan	1	6	1
(Czech Republic) L Fruhvirtová	6	1	6
WC	(Switzerland) B Bencic	6	6
Q	(Romania) PM Țig	4	1
(Georgia (country)) M Bolkvadze	7	6
4	A Zakharova	5	3
8	(Romania) E-G Ruse	6	6
Q	(Turkey) İ Öz	4	2
(United States) V Lepchenko	6	3	6
(Netherlands) A Koevermans	4	6	3
Q	(Austria) S Kraus	2	3
(Czech Republic) D Šalková	6	6
Q	(France) C Monnet	6	7
2	(Spain) N Párrizas Díaz	2	5

Second round
6	(France) O Dodin	6	6
(Czech Republic) L Fruhvirtová	4	2
WC	(Switzerland) B Bencic	6	6
(Georgia (country)) M Bolkvadze	1	1
8	(Romania) E-G Ruse	6^{6}	6^{5}
(United States) V Lepchenko	7^{8}	7^{7}
(Czech Republic) D Šalková	6	6
Q	(France) C Monnet	2	3

Quarterfinals
6	(France) O Dodin	3	1
WC	(Switzerland) B Bencic	6	6
(United States) V Lepchenko	2	6	2
(Czech Republic) D Šalková	6	2	6

Semifinals
WC	(Switzerland) B Bencic	6	6
(Czech Republic) D Šalková	1	2

== Qualifying ==
=== Seeds ===
1. (Austria) Sinja Kraus (qualified)
2. (Turkey) İpek Öz (qualified)
3. (France) Carole Monnet (qualified)
4. (Romania) Patricia Maria Țig (qualified)

=== Qualifiers ===
1. (Austria) Sinja Kraus
2. (Turkey) İpek Öz
3. (France) Carole Monnet
4. (Romania) Patricia Maria Țig

=== Lucky loser ===
1. (France) Yasmine Mansouri

=== Qualifying draw ===
==== First qualifier ====
Qualifying competition
1	(Austria) Sinja Kraus	6	6
WC	(France) Tiantsoa Sarah Rakotomanga Rajaonah	0	1

==== Second qualifier ====
Qualifying competition
2	(Turkey) İpek Öz	6	6
WC	(France) Alice Soulié	3	3

==== Third qualifier ====
Qualifying competition
3	(France) Carole Monnet	6	6
	(France) Diana Martynov	3	3

==== Fourth qualifier ====
Qualifying competition
4	(Romania) Patricia Maria Țig	6	3	6
	(France) Yasmine Mansouri	2	6	3
