= 2021 Open Angers Arena Loire – Singles =

Singles
- 2021 Open Angers Arena Loire

Final
- Champion: (Russia) Vitalia Diatchenko
- Runner-up: (China) Zhang Shuai
- Score: 6–0, 6–4

Details
- Draw: 32
- Seeds: 8

Events
Singles	Doubles
Open Angers Arena Loire	· 2022 →

This was the first edition of this tennis tournament.

Vitalia Diatchenko won her third career WTA 125 title, defeating Zhang Shuai 6–0, 6–4 in the final.

== Seeds ==
1. (Ukraine) Anhelina Kalinina (withdrew)
2. (China) Zhang Shuai (final)
3. (Belgium) Greet Minnen (second round)
4. (France) Clara Burel (quarterfinals, withdrew)
5. (Russia) Varvara Gracheva (first round)
6. (Russia) Vera Zvonareva (second round)
7. (France) Océane Dodin (first round)
8. (France) Kristina Mladenovic (quarterfinals)
9. (Ukraine) Dayana Yastremska (withdrew)

== Draw ==
=== Key ===
- Q = Qualifier
- WC = Wild card
- LL = Lucky loser
- Alt = Alternate
- SE = Special exempt
- PR = Protected ranking
- ITF = ITF entry
- JE = Junior exempt
- w/o = Walkover
- r = Retired
- d = Defaulted
- SR = Special ranking

=== Finals ===
Semifinals
LL	(Russia) Vitalia Diatchenko	7	6
Q	(Russia) Natalia Vikhlyantseva	5	2
Q	(China) Yuan Yue	4	0
2	(China) Zhang Shuai	6	6

Final
LL	(Russia) Vitalia Diatchenko	6	6
2	(China) Zhang Shuai	0	4

=== Top half ===
First round
LL	(Italy) M Di Giuseppe	6^{5}	6	1
Q	(Latvia) D Vismane	7^{7}	2	6
LL	(Russia) V Diatchenko	6	6
(Spain) C Bucșa	1	2
WC	(France) M Noël	7^{10}	6
(India) A Raina	6^{8}	3
(Slovenia) P Hercog	7	6
7	(France) O Dodin	5	0
4	(France) C Burel	2	6	6
WC	(France) E Jacquemot	6	3	1
(Georgia (country)) M Bolkvadze	6^{5}	3
Q	(Bulgaria) I Shinikova	7^{7}	6
(Romania) A Bogdan	2	2
Q	(Russia) N Vikhlyantseva	6	6
(Switzerland) S Vögele	4	4
6	(Russia) V Zvonareva	6	6

Second round
Q	(Latvia) D Vismane	6	6^{6}	6^{0}
LL	(Russia) V Diatchenko	2	7^{8}	7^{7}
WC	(France) M Noël	7^{11}	7^{7}
(Slovenia) P Hercog	6^{9}	6^{4}
4	(France) C Burel	6	2	6
Q	(Bulgaria) I Shinikova	4	6	3
Q	(Russia) N Vikhlyantseva	6	6
6	(Russia) V Zvonareva	3	4

Quarterfinals
LL	(Russia) V Diatchenko	6	7
WC	(France) M Noël	1	5
4	(France) C Burel
Q	(Russia) N Vikhlyantseva	w/o

Semifinals
LL	(Russia) V Diatchenko	7	6
Q	(Russia) N Vikhlyantseva	5	2

=== Bottom half ===
First round
5	(Russia) V Gracheva	4	3
(Austria) J Grabher	6	6
(Croatia) J Fett	6	6
WC	(Andorra) V Jiménez Kasintseva	4	2
Q	(China) Y Yuan	6	6
(Switzerland) L Küng	1	2
(France) C Paquet	4	4
3	(Belgium) G Minnen	6	6
8	(France) K Mladenovic	2	6	5
(Serbia) N Stojanović	6	4	3^{r}
(Germany) T Korpatsch	3	1
WC	(France) J Ponchet	6	6
(Russia) A Blinkova	6	6
(Russia) A Zakharova	2	3
(Switzerland) Y In-Albon	3	3
2	(China) S Zhang	6	6

Second round
(Austria) J Grabher	3	6	4
(Croatia) J Fett	6	2	6
Q	(China) Y Yuan	6	6
3	(Belgium) G Minnen	3	3
8	(France) K Mladenovic	3	6	6
WC	(France) J Ponchet	6	3	4
(Russia) A Blinkova	1	1
2	(China) S Zhang	6	6

Quarterfinals
(Croatia) J Fett	5	6	0
Q	(China) Y Yuan	7	3	6
8	(France) K Mladenovic	3	2
2	(China) S Zhang	6	6

Semifinals
Q	(China) Y Yuan	4	0
2	(China) S Zhang	6	6

== Qualifying ==
=== Seeds ===
1. (Russia) Vitalia Diatchenko (qualifying competition, lucky loser)
2. (Netherlands) Indy de Vroome (first round, retired)
3. (Bulgaria) Isabella Shinikova (qualified)
4. (Russia) Natalia Vikhlyantseva (qualified)
5. (Belarus) Iryna Shymanovich (qualifying competition)
6. (Italy) Martina Di Giuseppe (qualifying competition, lucky loser)
7. (China) Yuan Yue (qualified)
8. (Latvia) Daniela Vismane (qualified)

=== Qualifiers ===
1. (Latvia) Daniela Vismane
2. (China) Yuan Yue
3. (Bulgaria) Isabella Shinikova
4. (Russia) Natalia Vikhlyantseva

=== Lucky loser ===
1. (Russia) Vitalia Diatchenko
2. (Italy) Martina Di Giuseppe

=== Draw ===
==== First qualifier ====
First round
1	(Russia) Vitalia Diatchenko	6	6
WC	(France) Chloé Noël	0	3
(Norway) Ulrikke Eikeri	3	6^{4}
8	(Latvia) Daniela Vismane	6	7^{7}

Qualifying competition
1	(Russia) Vitalia Diatchenko	2	6^{5}
8	(Latvia) Daniela Vismane	6	7^{7}

==== Second qualifier ====
First round
2	(Netherlands) Indy de Vroome	6	6^{2}	2^{r}
WC	(France) Séléna Janicijevic	2	7^{7}	3
WC	(France) Léolia Jeanjean	3	3
7	(China) Yuan Yue	6	6

Qualifying competition
WC	(France) Séléna Janicijevic	2	0
7	(China) Yuan Yue	6	6

==== Third qualifier ====
First round
3	(Bulgaria) Isabella Shinikova	6	6
WC	(France) Alice Robbe	4	1
(Russia) Angelina Gabueva	3	2
6	(Italy) Martina Di Giuseppe	6	6

Qualifying competition
3	(Bulgaria) Isabella Shinikova	6	6
6	(Italy) Martina Di Giuseppe	3	2

==== Fourth qualifier ====
First round
4	(Russia) Natalia Vikhlyantseva	6	7
WC	(Chinese Taipei) Hsieh Yu-chieh	3	5
(Belgium) Lara Salden	6^{5}	1
5	(Belarus) Iryna Shymanovich	7^{7}	6

Qualifying competition
4	(Russia) Natalia Vikhlyantseva	7	6
5	(Belarus) Iryna Shymanovich	5	1
