= 2023 Open Angers Arena Loire – Singles =

Singles
- 2023 Open Angers Arena Loire

Final
- Champion: (France) Clara Burel
- Runner-up: (France) Chloé Paquet
- Score: 3–6, 6–4, 6–2

Details
- Draw: 32 (4 Q / 4 WC)
- Seeds: 8

Events
Singles	Doubles
← 2022 ·	Open Angers Arena Loire	· 2024 →

Clara Burel won the singles title at 2023 Open Angers Arena Loire, defeating Chloé Paquet in the final, 3–6, 6–4, 6–2.

Alycia Parks was the reigning champion, but did not participate this year.

== Seeds ==
1. (Italy) Elisabetta Cocciaretto (quarterfinals)
2. (France) Clara Burel (champion)
3. (Spain) Cristina Bucșa (semifinals)
4. (Denmark) Clara Tauson (first round)
5. (France) Océane Dodin (first round)
6. (Ukraine) Dayana Yastremska (semifinals)
7. (Sweden) Rebecca Peterson (withdrew)
8. (France) Alizé Cornet (second round)

== Draw ==
=== Key ===
- Q = Qualifier
- WC = Wild card
- LL = Lucky loser
- Alt = Alternate
- ITF = ITF entry
- PR = Protected ranking
- SR = Special ranking
- SE = Special exempt
- JE = Junior exempt
- JR = Junior Accelerator Programme entrant
- CO = College Accelerator Programme entrant
- NG = Next Gen Accelerator Program entrant
- w/o = Walkover
- r = Retired
- d = Defaulted

=== Finals ===
Semifinals
(France) Chloé Paquet	7^{7}	6
3	(Spain) Cristina Bucșa	6^{3}	2
6	(Ukraine) Dayana Yastremska	7^{7}	3	2
2	(France) Clara Burel	6^{3}	6	6

Final
(France) Chloé Paquet	6	4	2
2	(France) Clara Burel	3	6	6

=== Top half ===
First round
1	(Italy) E Cocciaretto	6	3	6
(Switzerland) S Bandecchi	1	6	1
(Switzerland) C Naef	2	6	6
Q	(France) É Dartron	6	4	0
(Estonia) K Kanepi	4	2
(France) C Paquet	6	6
(Czech Republic) G Knutson	5	6^{1}
8	(France) A Cornet	7	7^{7}
3	(Spain) C Bucșa	6	2	6
(France) A Robbe	1	6	1
WC	(France) H Tan	6	4	3
(Croatia) L Bošković	1	6	6
(France) J Ponchet	6	5	6
PR	(France) A Hesse	4	7	4
WC	(France) A Albié	7^{7}	6
5	(France) O Dodin	6^{4}	3

Second round
1	(Italy) E Cocciaretto	2	6	6
(Switzerland) C Naef	6	3	1
(France) C Paquet	6	7^{7}
8	(France) A Cornet	3	6^{5}
3	(Spain) C Bucșa	6	4	6
(Croatia) L Bošković	3	6	1
(France) J Ponchet
WC	(France) A Albié	w/o

Quarterfinals
1	(Italy) E Cocciaretto	5	3
(France) C Paquet	7	6
3	(Spain) C Bucșa	6	6
WC	(France) A Albié	3	1

Semifinals
(France) C Paquet	7^{7}	6
3	(Spain) C Bucșa	6^{3}	2

=== Bottom half ===
First round
6	(Ukraine) D Yastremska	2	6	6
WC	(France) T Lemaître	6	2	4
(Cyprus) R Șerban	6	6
WC	(France) M Léonard	4	0
PR	(Romania) PM Țig	7	0	3^{r}
Q	(Malta) F Curmi	5	6	2
(United States) M Kessler	7^{7}	6
4	(Denmark) C Tauson	6^{2}	3
LL	(Ukraine) A Soboleva	6	3	5
Q	(Romania) A Mitu	4	6	7
(Spain) N Párrizas Díaz	5	3
E Andreeva	7	6
Q	(Germany) M Barthel	6	7^{7}
(Liechtenstein) K von Deichmann	3	6^{5}
(France) E Jacquemot	4	4
2	(France) C Burel	6	6

Second round
6	(Ukraine) D Yastremska	6	6
(Cyprus) R Șerban	4	3
Q	(Malta) F Curmi	4	3
(United States) M Kessler	6	6
Q	(Romania) A Mitu	2	5
E Andreeva	6	7
Q	(Germany) M Barthel	2	6^{5}
2	(France) C Burel	6	7^{7}

Quarterfinals
6	(Ukraine) D Yastremska	5	6	7^{11}
(United States) M Kessler	7	3	6^{9}
E Andreeva	6^{5}	6	3
2	(France) C Burel	7^{7}	2	6

Semifinals
6	(Ukraine) D Yastremska	7^{7}	3	2
2	(France) C Burel	6^{3}	6	6

== Qualifying ==
=== Seeds ===
1. (Romania) Andreea Mitu (qualified)
2. (France) Margaux Rouvroy (withdrew)
3. (Germany) Mona Barthel (qualified)
4. (Ukraine) Anastasiya Soboleva (qualifying competition, lucky loser)

=== Qualifiers ===
1. (Romania) Andreea Mitu
2. (Malta) Francesca Curmi
3. (Germany) Mona Barthel
4. (France) Émeline Dartron

=== Lucky loser ===
1. (Ukraine) Anastasiya Soboleva

=== Qualifying draw ===
==== First qualifier ====
Qualifying competition
1	(Romania) Andreea Mitu	7	6
	(France) Loïs Boisson	5	4

==== Second qualifier ====
Qualifying competition
Alt	(United States) Alana Smith	2	4
	(Malta) Francesca Curmi	6	6

==== Third qualifier ====
Qualifying competition
3	(Germany) Mona Barthel	6	6
WC	(France) Aravane Rezaï	2	1

==== Fourth qualifier ====
Qualifying competition
4	(Ukraine) Anastasiya Soboleva	4	3
WC	(France) Émeline Dartron	6	6
