= 2021 Open Angers Arena Loire =

- Date: 6 – 12 December
- Edition: 1st
- Category: WTA 125
- Draw: 32S / 8D
- Prize money: $115,000
- Surface: Hard (Indoor)
- Location: Angers, France
- Venue: Arena Loire

Champions

Singles
- (Russia) Vitalia Diatchenko

Doubles
- (Slovakia) Tereza Mihalíková / (Belgium) Greet Minnen
Open Angers Arena Loire	· 2022 →

The 2021 Open Angers Arena Loire was a professional tennis tournament played on indoor hard courts. It was the 1st edition of the tournament and part of the 2021 WTA 125 tournaments season, offering a total of $115,000 in prize money. It took place in Angers, France from 6 to 12 December 2021.

== Singles main draw entrants ==
=== Seeds ===
Country	Player	Rank^{1}	Seed
~~UKR~~	~~Anhelina Kalinina~~	~~52~~	~~1~~
CHN	Zhang Shuai	62	2
BEL	Greet Minnen	75	3
FRA	Clara Burel	77	4
RUS	Varvara Gracheva	79	5
RUS	Vera Zvonareva	87	6
FRA	Océane Dodin	90	7
FRA	Kristina Mladenovic	93	8
~~UKR~~	~~Dayana Yastremska~~	~~100~~	~~9~~

- ^{1} Rankings as of 29 November 2021.

=== Other entrants ===
The following players received a wildcard into the singles main draw:

- (France) Elsa Jacquemot
- (Andorra) Victoria Jiménez Kasintseva
- (France) Mallaurie Noël
- (France) Jessika Ponchet

The following players received entry from the qualifying draw:

- (Bulgaria) Isabella Shinikova
- (Russia) Natalia Vikhlyantseva
- (Latvia) Daniela Vismane
- (China) Yuan Yue

The following players received entry as lucky losers:

- (Russia) Vitalia Diatchenko
- (Italy) Martina Di Giuseppe

=== Withdrawals ===
Before the tournament

- (Romania) Mihaela Buzărnescu → replaced by (Georgia (country)) Mariam Bolkvadze
- (France) Alizé Cornet → replaced by (Germany) Tamara Korpatsch
- (Romania) Jaqueline Cristian → replaced by (India) Ankita Raina
- (Serbia) Olga Danilović → replaced by (Switzerland) Leonie Küng
- (Ukraine) Anhelina Kalinina → replaced by (Russia) Vitalia Diatchenko
- (Germany) Jule Niemeier → replaced by (Switzerland) Ylena In-Albon
- (Bulgaria) Viktoriya Tomova → replaced by (Russia) Anna Blinkova
- (Ukraine) Dayana Yastremska → replaced by (Italy) Martina Di Giuseppe
- (Belgium) Maryna Zanevska → replaced by (Austria) Julia Grabher
- (China) Zheng Qinwen → replaced by (Spain) Cristina Bucșa

== Doubles entrants ==
=== Seeds ===
Country	Player	Country	Player	Rank^{1}	Seed
ROU	Monica Niculescu	RUS	Vera Zvonareva	93	1
RUS	Anna Blinkova	SRB	Nina Stojanović	107	2

- ^{1} Rankings as of 29 November 2021.

== Champions ==
=== Singles ===
- (Russia) Vitalia Diatchenko def (China) Zhang Shuai 6–0, 6–4

=== Doubles ===
- (Slovakia) Tereza Mihalíková / (Belgium) Greet Minnen def (Romania) Monica Niculescu / (Russia) Vera Zvonareva 4–6, 6–1, [10–8]
