= 2023 Open Angers Arena Loire =

- Date: 4 – 10 December
- Edition: 3rd
- Category: WTA 125
- Draw: 32S / 8D
- Prize money: $115,000
- Surface: Hard (indoor)
- Location: Angers, France
- Venue: Arena Loire

Champions

Singles
- (France) Clara Burel

Doubles
- (Spain) Cristina Bucșa / (Romania) Monica Niculescu
← 2022 ·	Open Angers Arena Loire	· 2024 →

The 2023 Open P2I Angers Arena Loire was a professional women's tennis tournament played on indoor hard courts. It was the 3rd edition of the tournament and part of the 2023 WTA 125 tournaments season, offering $115,000 in prize money. It took place in Angers, France from 4 to 10 December 2023.

== Champions ==
=== Singles ===
- (France) Clara Burel def. (France) Chloé Paquet, 3–6, 6–4, 6–2

=== Doubles ===
- (Spain) Cristina Bucșa / (Romania) Monica Niculescu def. (Kazakhstan) Anna Danilina / Alexandra Panova, 6–1, 6–3

== Singles main draw entrants ==
=== Seeds ===
Country	Player	Rank^{1}	Seed
ITA	Elisabetta Cocciaretto	48	1
FRA	Clara Burel	61	2
ESP	Cristina Bucșa	82	3
DEN	Clara Tauson	85	4
FRA	Océane Dodin	97	5
UKR	Dayana Yastremska	106	6
~~SWE~~	~~Rebecca Peterson~~	~~108~~	~~7~~
FRA	Alizé Cornet	118	8

- ^{1} Rankings as of 27 November 2023.

=== Other entrants ===
The following players received a wildcard into the singles main draw:

- (France) Audrey Albié
- (France) Tiphanie Lemaître
- (France) Manon Léonard
- (France) Harmony Tan

The following players received entry using a protected ranking:

- (France) Amandine Hesse
- (Romania) Patricia Maria Țig

The following players received entry from the qualifying draw:

- (Germany) Mona Barthel
- (Malta) Francesca Curmi
- (France) Émeline Dartron
- (Romania) Andreea Mitu

The following player received entry as a lucky loser:

- (Ukraine) Anastasiya Soboleva

=== Withdrawals ===
Before the tournament

- (China) Bai Zhuoxuan → replaced by (France) Elsa Jacquemot
- (Croatia) Jana Fett → replaced by (Cyprus) Raluca Șerban
- (Germany) Anna-Lena Friedsam → replaced by (France) Alice Robbe
- (Germany) Tamara Korpatsch → replaced by (France) Chloé Paquet
- (Germany) Eva Lys → replaced by (Liechtenstein) Kathinka von Deichmann
- (Sweden) Rebecca Peterson → replaced by (Ukraine) Anastasiya Soboleva
- (Latvia) Darja Semeņistaja → replaced by (Estonia) Kaia Kanepi
- (United States) Sachia Vickery → replaced by (Czech Republic) Gabriela Knutson
- (Belgium) Yanina Wickmayer → replaced by (France) Amandine Hesse

== Doubles entrants ==
=== Seeds ===
Country	Player	Country	Player	Rank^{1}	Seed
ESP	Cristina Bucșa	ROU	Monica Niculescu	108	1
KAZ	Anna Danilina		Alexandra Panova	116	2

- ^{1} Rankings as of 27 November 2023.

=== Other entrants ===
The following pair received entry as alternates:

- (United States) McCartney Kessler / (United States) Alana Smith

=== Withdrawals ===
- (France) Clara Burel / (France) Chloé Paquet → replaced by (United States) McCartney Kessler / (United States) Alana Smith
