= 2022 Open Angers Arena Loire =

- Date: 5 – 11 December
- Edition: 2nd
- Category: WTA 125
- Draw: 32S / 8D
- Prize money: $115,000
- Surface: Hard (indoor)
- Location: Angers, France
- Venue: Arena Loire

Champions

Singles
- (United States) Alycia Parks

Doubles
- (United States) Alycia Parks / (China) Zhang Shuai
| ← 2021 · | Open Angers Arena Loire | · 2023 → |

The 2022 Open P2I Angers Arena Loire was a professional tennis tournament played on indoor hard courts. It was the 2nd edition of the tournament and part of the 2022 WTA 125 tournaments season, offering a total of $115,000 in prize money. It took place in Angers, France from 5 to 11 December 2022.

== Champions ==
=== Singles ===
- (United States) Alycia Parks def. (Germany) Anna-Lena Friedsam 6–4, 4–6, 6–4

=== Doubles ===
- (United States) Alycia Parks / (China) Zhang Shuai def. (Czech Republic) Miriam Kolodziejová / (Czech Republic) Markéta Vondroušová 6–2, 6–2

== Singles main draw entrants ==
=== Seeds ===
| Country | Player | Rank^{1} | Seed |
|---|---|---|---|
| CHN | Zhang Shuai | 24 | 1 |
| UKR | Anhelina Kalinina | 53 | 2 |
| BEL | Alison Van Uytvanck | 55 | 3 |
| GER | Tatjana Maria | 70 | 4 |
| GER | Tamara Korpatsch | 74 | 5 |
| | Anna Blinkova | 80 | 6 |
| BUL | Viktoriya Tomova | 90 | 7 |
| | Varvara Gracheva | 95 | 8 |

- ^{1} Rankings as of 28 November 2022.

=== Other entrants ===
The following players received a wildcard into the singles main draw:

- (France) Tessah Andrianjafitrimo
- (United States) Sofia Kenin
- (Germany) Sabine Lisicki
- (France) Jessika Ponchet
- (China) Zhang Shuai

The following players received entry into the singles main draw through protected ranking:

- (Belgium) Yanina Wickmayer
- (Ukraine) Katarina Zavatska

The following players received entry from the qualifying draw:

- (France) Émeline Dartron
- (Chinese Taipei) Joanna Garland
- (Belgium) Magali Kempen
- (Belgium) Greet Minnen

The following players received entry as lucky loser:

- (United States) Hina Inoue
- (Turkey) Pemra Özgen

=== Withdrawals ===
Before the tournament

- Erika Andreeva → replaced by (Belgium) Yanina Wickmayer
- Elina Avanesyan → replaced by (United States) Hina Inoue
- (United Kingdom) Jodie Burrage → replaced by (Germany) Anna-Lena Friedsam
- Vitalia Diatchenko → replaced by (Switzerland) Joanne Züger
- (France) Léolia Jeanjean → replaced by (Turkey) Pemra Özgen
- (Czech Republic) Linda Nosková → replaced by (Romania) Jaqueline Cristian
- (Spain) Nuria Párrizas Díaz → replaced by (Ukraine) Katarina Zavatska

== Doubles entrants ==
=== Seeds ===
| Country | Player | Country | Player | Rank^{1} | Seed |
|---|---|---|---|---|---|
| USA | Alycia Parks | CHN | Zhang Shuai | 98 | 1 |
| GEO | Natela Dzalamidze | | Alexandra Panova | 120 | 2 |

- ^{1} Rankings as of 28 November 2022.

=== Other entrants ===
The following pair received a wildcard into the doubles main draw:

- (Belgium) Magali Kempen / (France) Elixane Lechemia
