= 2022 Open Angers Arena Loire – Singles =

Singles
- 2022 Open Angers Arena Loire

Final
- Champion: (United States) Alycia Parks
- Runner-up: (Germany) Anna-Lena Friedsam
- Score: 6–4, 4–6, 6–4

Details
- Draw: 32 (4 Q / 5 WC)
- Seeds: 8

Events
Singles	Doubles
← 2021 ·	Open Angers Arena Loire	· 2023 →

Vitalia Diatchenko was the defending champion but withdrew before the tournament began.

Alycia Parks won her second consecutive WTA 125K title, defeating Anna-Lena Friedsam in the final, 6–4, 4–6, 6–4.

== Seeds ==
1. (China) Zhang Shuai (first round)
2. (Ukraine) Anhelina Kalinina (semifinals)
3. (Belgium) Alison Van Uytvanck (first round)
4. (Germany) Tatjana Maria (first round)
5. (Germany) Tamara Korpatsch (second round)
6. Anna Blinkova (second round)
7. (Bulgaria) Viktoriya Tomova (second round)
8. Varvara Gracheva (second round)

== Draw ==
=== Key ===
- Q = Qualifier
- WC = Wild card
- LL = Lucky loser
- Alt = Alternate
- SE = Special exempt
- PR = Protected ranking
- ITF = ITF entry
- JE = Junior exempt
- w/o = Walkover
- r = Retired
- d = Defaulted
- SR = Special ranking

=== Finals ===
Semifinals
(United States) Alycia Parks	4	7^{7}	6
WC	(France) Jessika Ponchet	6	6^{3}	4
(Germany) Anna-Lena Friedsam	7^{8}	6
2	(Ukraine) Anhelina Kalinina	6^{6}	3

Final
(United States) Alycia Parks	6	4	6
(Germany) Anna-Lena Friedsam	4	6	4

=== Top half ===
First round
1/WC	(China) S Zhang	2	3
(United States) A Parks	6	6
(Romania) J Cristian	6	7^{7}
LL	(United States) H Inoue	4	6^{5}
(Czech Republic) M Vondroušová	6	7^{7}
SR	(Belgium) Y Wickmayer	1	6^{5}
Q	(Chinese Taipei) J Garland	6	3	0
7	(Bulgaria) V Tomova	1	6	6
4	(Germany) T Maria	5	1
Q	(Belgium) G Minnen	7	6
WC	(France) J Ponchet	7	6^{2}	7^{7}
SR	(Ukraine) K Zavatska	5	7^{7}	6^{3}
(Czech Republic) K Muchová	6	6^{1}	3
(France) C Burel	2	7^{7}	6
WC	(France) T Andrianjafitrimo	0	3
8	V Gracheva	6	6

Second round
(United States) A Parks	6	6
(Romania) J Cristian	4	4
(Czech Republic) M Vondroušová	6	6
7	(Bulgaria) V Tomova	2	2
Q	(Belgium) G Minnen	5	2
WC	(France) J Ponchet	7	6
(France) C Burel	7^{7}	4	6
8	V Gracheva	6^{5}	6	1

Quarterfinals
(United States) A Parks	6	7^{7}
(Czech Republic) M Vondroušová	1	6^{3}
WC	(France) J Ponchet	7	6
(France) C Burel	5	1

Semifinals
(United States) A Parks	4	7^{7}	6
WC	(France) J Ponchet	6	6^{3}	4

=== Bottom half ===
First round
5	(Germany) T Korpatsch	3	6	6
(United States) E Mandlik	6	1	1
Q	(France) É Dartron	6^{2}	6	6
LL	(Turkey) P Özgen	7^{7}	3	2
(Germany) A-L Friedsam	6	6
(France) D Parry	3	2
Q	(Belgium) M Kempen	6	3	6
3	(Belgium) A Van Uytvanck	2	6	3
6	A Blinkova	6	6^{4}	6
(Switzerland) J Züger	4	7^{7}	3
(Denmark) C Tauson	6	6
WC	(Germany) S Lisicki	1	1
(Ukraine) D Yastremska	4	2
WC	(United States) S Kenin	6	6
(United States) K Scott	1	2
2	(Ukraine) A Kalinina	6	6

Second round
5	(Germany) T Korpatsch	4	4
Q	(France) É Dartron	6	6
(Germany) A-L Friedsam	6	7^{10}
Q	(Belgium) M Kempen	1	6^{8}
6	A Blinkova	5	3
(Denmark) C Tauson	7	6
WC	(United States) S Kenin	4	4
2	(Ukraine) A Kalinina	6	6

Quarterfinals
Q	(France) É Dartron	1	2
(Germany) A-L Friedsam	6	6
(Denmark) C Tauson	6^{3}	4
2	(Ukraine) A Kalinina	7^{7}	6

Semifinals
(Germany) A-L Friedsam	7^{8}	6
2	(Ukraine) A Kalinina	6^{6}	3

== Qualifying ==
=== Seeds ===
1. (Switzerland) Joanne Züger (moved into main draw)
2. (Belgium) Greet Minnen (qualified)
3. (Belgium) Magali Kempen (qualified)
4. (Chinese Taipei) Joanna Garland (qualified)
5. (Lithuania) Justina Mikulskytė (first round)
6. (Turkey) Pemra Özgen (qualifying competition, lucky loser)
7. (Sweden) Caijsa Hennemann (first round)
8. (Belgium) Yanina Wickmayer (moved into main draw)

=== Qualifiers ===
1. (France) Émeline Dartron
2. (Belgium) Greet Minnen
3. (Belgium) Magali Kempen
4. (Chinese Taipei) Joanna Garland

=== Lucky losers ===
1. (Turkey) Pemra Özgen
2. (United States) Hina Inoue

=== Qualifying draw ===
==== First qualifier ====
First round				Qualifying competition
				(France) Chloé Noël	1	5
				(France) Émeline Dartron	6	7
	(France) Émeline Dartron	6	6	(France) Émeline Dartron	6	7
5	(Lithuania) Justina Mikulskytė	2	0

==== Second qualifier ====
First round
2	(Belgium) Greet Minnen	6	6
(France) Alice Tubello	0	4
(United States) Hina Inoue	5	6	6
7	(Sweden) Caijsa Hennemann	7	1	4

Qualifying competition
2	(Belgium) Greet Minnen	6	6
(United States) Hina Inoue	2	3

==== Third qualifier ====
First round				Qualifying competition
3	(Belgium) Magali Kempen	6	6
	(Spain) Georgina García Pérez	4	3
	(Spain) Georgina García Pérez	4	3	3	(Belgium) Magali Kempen	6	6
					(France) Jenny Lim	2	1

==== Fourth qualifier ====
First round
4	(Chinese Taipei) Joanna Garland	6	6
Anna Ukolova	1	0
(Mexico) María Portillo Ramírez	0	2
6	(Turkey) Pemra Özgen	6	6

Qualifying competition
4	(Chinese Taipei) Joanna Garland	6	7^{7}
6	(Turkey) Pemra Özgen	1	6^{4}
