= 2024 Open Angers Arena Loire – Doubles =

Doubles
- 2024 Open Angers Arena Loire

Final
- Champions: (Romania) Monica Niculescu (Romania) Elena-Gabriela Ruse
- Runners-up: (Switzerland) Belinda Bencic (Switzerland) Céline Naef
- Score: 6–3, 6–4

Events
Singles	Doubles
← 2023 ·	Open Angers Arena Loire	· 2025 →

Cristina Bucșa and Monica Niculescu were the reigning champions, but Bucșa did not participate this year. Niculescu partnered Elena-Gabriela Ruse and successfully defended her title, with the pair defeating Belinda Bencic and Céline Naef 6–3, 6–4 in the final. It was Niculescu's third WTA 125 doubles title and Ruse's first.

== Seeds ==
1. (Romania) Monica Niculescu / (Romania) Elena-Gabriela Ruse (champions)
2. (United Kingdom) Emily Appleton / (United Kingdom) Maia Lumsden (quarterfinals)

== Draw ==
=== Key ===
- Q = Qualifier
- WC = Wild card
- LL = Lucky loser
- Alt = Alternate
- SE = Special exempt
- PR = Protected ranking
- ITF = ITF entry
- JE = Junior exempt
- w/o = Walkover
- r = Retired
- d = Defaulted
- SR = Special ranking

=== Draw ===
Quarterfinals
1	(Romania) M Niculescu (Romania) E-G Ruse	7	6
(Georgia (country)) O Kalashnikova (Belgium) L Salden	5	4
(United States) Q Gleason (Belgium) K Zimmermann	6	6
WC	(France) E Jacquemot (France) S Janicijevic	3	4
(United Kingdom) S Murray Sharan (United Kingdom) E Silva	7	6
(Spain) Y Cavallé Reimers (Spain) N Párrizas Díaz	5	2
(Switzerland) B Bencic (Switzerland) C Naef	6	6
2	(United Kingdom) E Appleton (United Kingdom) M Lumsden	2	2

Semifinals
1	(Romania) M Niculescu (Romania) E-G Ruse	6	6
(United States) Q Gleason (Belgium) K Zimmermann	4	2
(United Kingdom) S Murray Sharan (United Kingdom) E Silva	3	3
(Switzerland) B Bencic (Switzerland) C Naef	6	6

Final
1	(Romania) M Niculescu (Romania) E-G Ruse	6	6
(Switzerland) B Bencic (Switzerland) C Naef	3	4
