= 2022 Open Angers Arena Loire – Doubles =

Doubles
- 2022 Open Angers Arena Loire

Final
- Champions: (United States) Alycia Parks (China) Zhang Shuai
- Runners-up: (Czech Republic) Miriam Kolodziejová (Czech Republic) Markéta Vondroušová
- Score: 6–2, 6–2

Events
Singles	Doubles
← 2021 ·	Open Angers Arena Loire	· 2023 →

Tereza Mihalíková and Greet Minnen were the reigning champions, but did not participate this year.

Alycia Parks and Zhang Shuai won the title, defeating Miriam Kolodziejová and Markéta Vondroušová in the final, 6–2, 6–2.

== Seeds ==
1. (United States) Alycia Parks / (China) Zhang Shuai (champions)
2. (Georgia (country)) Natela Dzalamidze / Alexandra Panova (semifinals)

== Draw ==
=== Key ===
- Q = Qualifier
- WC = Wild card
- LL = Lucky loser
- Alt = Alternate
- SE = Special exempt
- PR = Protected ranking
- ITF = ITF entry
- JE = Junior exempt
- w/o = Walkover
- r = Retired
- d = Defaulted
- SR = Special ranking

=== Draw ===
Quarterfinals
1	(United States) A Parks (China) S Zhang	6	6
(Czech Republic) A Dețiuc (Georgia (country)) O Kalashnikova	3	2
(Germany) V Heisen (Romania) M Niculescu	6	6
(Ukraine) N Kichenok (Belgium) K Zimmermann	4	3
(Czech Republic) M Kolodziejová (Czech Republic) M Vondroušová	6	6
WC	(Belgium) M Kempen (France) E Lechemia	3	4
(France) J Ponchet (Czech Republic) R Voráčová	6^{6}	5
2	(Georgia (country)) N Dzalamidze; A Panova	7	7

Semifinals
1	(United States) A Parks (China) S Zhang	w/o
(Germany) V Heisen (Romania) M Niculescu
(Czech Republic) M Kolodziejová (Czech Republic) M Vondroušová	6	6
2	(Georgia (country)) N Dzalamidze; A Panova	3	4

Final
1	(United States) Alycia Parks (China) Zhang Shuai	6	6
(Czech Republic) Miriam Kolodziejová (Czech Republic) Markéta Vondroušová	2	2
