= 2021 Open Angers Arena Loire – Doubles =

Doubles
- 2021 Open Angers Arena Loire

Final
- Champions: (Slovakia) Tereza Mihalíková (Belgium) Greet Minnen
- Runners-up: (Romania) Monica Niculescu (Russia) Vera Zvonareva
- Score: 4–6, 6–1, [10–8]

Events
Singles	Doubles
Open Angers Arena Loire	· 2022 →

This was the first edition of the tournament.

Tereza Mihalíková and Greet Minnen won the title, defeating Monica Niculescu and Vera Zvonareva in the final, 4–6, 6–1, [10–8].

== Seeds ==
1. (Romania) Monica Niculescu / (Russia) Vera Zvonareva (final)
2. (Russia) Anna Blinkova / (Serbia) Nina Stojanović (quarterfinals)

== Draw ==
=== Key ===
- Q = Qualifier
- WC = Wild card
- LL = Lucky loser
- Alt = Alternate
- SE = Special exempt
- PR = Protected ranking
- ITF = ITF entry
- JE = Junior exempt
- w/o = Walkover
- r = Retired
- d = Defaulted
- SR = Special ranking

=== Draw ===
Quarterfinals
1	(Romania) M Niculescu (Russia) V Zvonareva	6	3	[10]
(Poland) K Piter (India) A Raina	4	6	[4]
(France) E Lechemia (Germany) J Lohoff	6	3	[6]
(Norway) U Eikeri (Belgium) K Zimmermann	3	6	[10]
(Georgia (country)) O Kalashnikova (Russia) A Panova	7^{7}	6
(France) E Cascino (France) J Ponchet	6^{5}	2
(Slovakia) T Mihalíková (Belgium) G Minnen	2	7	[10]
2	(Russia) A Blinkova (Serbia) N Stojanović	6	5	[8]

Semifinals
1	(Romania) M Niculescu (Russia) V Zvonareva	6	7
(Norway) U Eikeri (Belgium) K Zimmermann	3	5
(Georgia (country)) O Kalashnikova (Russia) A Panova	4	6	[4]
(Slovakia) T Mihalíková (Belgium) G Minnen	6	4	[10]

Final
1	(Romania) M Niculescu (Russia) V Zvonareva	6	1	[8]
(Slovakia) T Mihalíková (Belgium) G Minnen	4	6	[10]
