= 2025 Open Angers Arena Loire =

- Date: 1 – 7 December
- Edition: 5th
- Category: WTA 125
- Draw: 32S / 6D
- Prize money: $115,000
- Surface: Hard (indoor)
- Location: Angers, France
- Venue: Arena Loire

Champions

Singles
- (Uzbekistan) Kamilla Rakhimova

Doubles
- (Germany) Tamara Korpatsch / (France) Jessika Ponchet
- Open Angers Arena Loire

The 2025 Open Angers Loire Trélazé was a professional women's tennis tournament played on indoor hard courts. It was the 5th edition of the tournament and part of the 2025 WTA 125 tournaments, offering $115,000 in prize money. It took place in Angers, France from 1 to 7 December 2025.

== Singles main draw entrants ==
=== Seeds ===
| Country | Player | Rank^{1} | Seed |
|---|---|---|---|
| USA | Alycia Parks | 68 | 1 |
| CRO | Antonia Ružić | 78 | 2 |
| | Polina Kudermetova | 90 | 3 |
| ~~LAT~~ | ~~Darja Semeņistaja~~ | ~~97~~ | ~~4~~ |
| ~~ROU~~ | ~~Elena-Gabriela Ruse~~ | ~~101~~ | ~~5~~ |
| CHN | Zhang Shuai | 102 | 6 |
| ITA | Lucia Bronzetti | 105 | 7 |
| AND | Victoria Jiménez Kasintseva | 108 | 8 |
| UZB | Kamilla Rakhimova | 109 | 9 |

- ^{1} Rankings as of 24 November 2025.

=== Other entrants ===
The following players received a wildcard into the singles main draw:

- (France) Chloé Paquet
- (France) Fiona Ferro
- (Belgium) Jeline Vandromme

The following player received entry using a protected ranking:

- (France) Océane Dodin

The following players received entry from the qualifying draw:

- (Spain) Marina Bassols Ribera
- (United Kingdom) Lily Miyazaki
- (Ukraine) Veronika Podrez
- (Australia) Tina Smith

The following player received entry as lucky losers:

- (France) Amandine Monnot
- (Czech Republic) Anna Sisková

=== Withdrawals ===
Before the tournament

- (United Kingdom) Katie Boulter → replaced by (Czech Republic) Dominika Šalková
- (Italy) Elisabetta Cocciaretto → replaced by (Poland) Linda Klimovičová
- (Chinese Taipei) Joanna Garland → replaced by Alina Charaeva
- (Austria) Julia Grabher → replaced by (Germany) Tamara Korpatsch
- (France) Elsa Jacquemot → replaced by (France) Jessika Ponchet
- (United Kingdom) Sonay Kartal → replaced by (Italy) Camilla Rosatello
- (Czech Republic) Barbora Krejčíková → replaced by (Germany) Mona Barthel
- (Switzerland) Rebeka Masarova → replaced by Alina Korneeva
- (Romania) Elena-Gabriela Ruse → replaced by (Czech Republic) Anna Sisková (LL)
- Oksana Selekhmeteva → replaced by (Serbia) Teodora Kostović
- (Latvia) Darja Semeņistaja → replaced by (France) Amandine Monnot (LL)

== Doubles entrants ==
=== Seeds ===
| Country | Player | Country | Player | Rank^{1} | Seed |
|---|---|---|---|---|---|
| BEL | Magali Kempen | CZE | Anna Sisková | 127 | 1 |
| CZE | Jesika Malečková | CZE | Miriam Škoch | 140 | 2 |

- ^{1} Rankings as of 24 November 2025.

== Champions ==
=== Singles ===
- (Uzbekistan) Kamilla Rakhimova def. (Germany) Tamara Korpatsch 6–3, 7–6^{(7–4)}

=== Doubles ===
- (Germany) Tamara Korpatsch / (France) Jessika Ponchet def. (Czech Republic) Jesika Malečková / (Czech Republic) Miriam Škoch 6–3, 6–2
