= 2023 Open Angers Arena Loire – Doubles =

Doubles
- 2023 Open Angers Arena Loire

Final
- Champions: (Spain) Cristina Bucșa (Romania) Monica Niculescu
- Runners-up: (Kazakhstan) Anna Danilina; Alexandra Panova
- Score: 6–1, 6–3

Events
Singles	Doubles
← 2022 ·	Open Angers Arena Loire	· 2024 →

Cristina Bucșa and Monica Niculescu won the doubles title at the 2023 Open Angers Arena Loire, defeating Anna Danilina and Alexandra Panova in the final, 6–1, 6–3.

Alycia Parks and Zhang Shuai were the reigning champions, but did not participate this year.

== Seeds ==
1. (Spain) Cristina Bucșa / (Romania) Monica Niculescu (champions)
2. (Kazakhstan) Anna Danilina / Alexandra Panova (final)

== Draw ==
=== Key ===
- Q = Qualifier
- WC = Wild card
- LL = Lucky loser
- Alt = Alternate
- SE = Special exempt
- PR = Protected ranking
- ITF = ITF entry
- JE = Junior exempt
- w/o = Walkover
- r = Retired
- d = Defaulted
- SR = Special ranking

=== Draw ===
Quarterfinals
1	(Spain) C Bucșa (Romania) M Niculescu	6	6
(Georgia (country)) O Kalashnikova (United Kingdom) M Lumsden	4	1
(Georgia (country)) N Dzalamidze (Italy) A Moratelli	6	7
(Switzerland) S Bandecchi (Czech Republic) G Knutson	3	5
(Netherlands) B Schoofs (Belgium) K Zimmermann	2	6	[10]
(France) E Jacquemot (Cyprus) R Șerban	6	3	[4]
Alt	(United States) M Kessler (United States) A Smith	3	6	[6]
2	(Kazakhstan) A Danilina; A Panova	6	2	[10]

Semifinals
1	(Spain) C Bucșa (Romania) M Niculescu	6	6
(Georgia (country)) N Dzalamidze (Italy) A Moratelli	3	2
(Netherlands) B Schoofs (Belgium) K Zimmermann	6^{7}	2
2	(Kazakhstan) A Danilina; A Panova	7^{9}	6

Final
1	(Spain) C Bucșa (Romania) M Niculescu	6	6
2	(Kazakhstan) A Danilina; A Panova	1	3
