= Chloé Paquet =

French tennis player (born 1994)

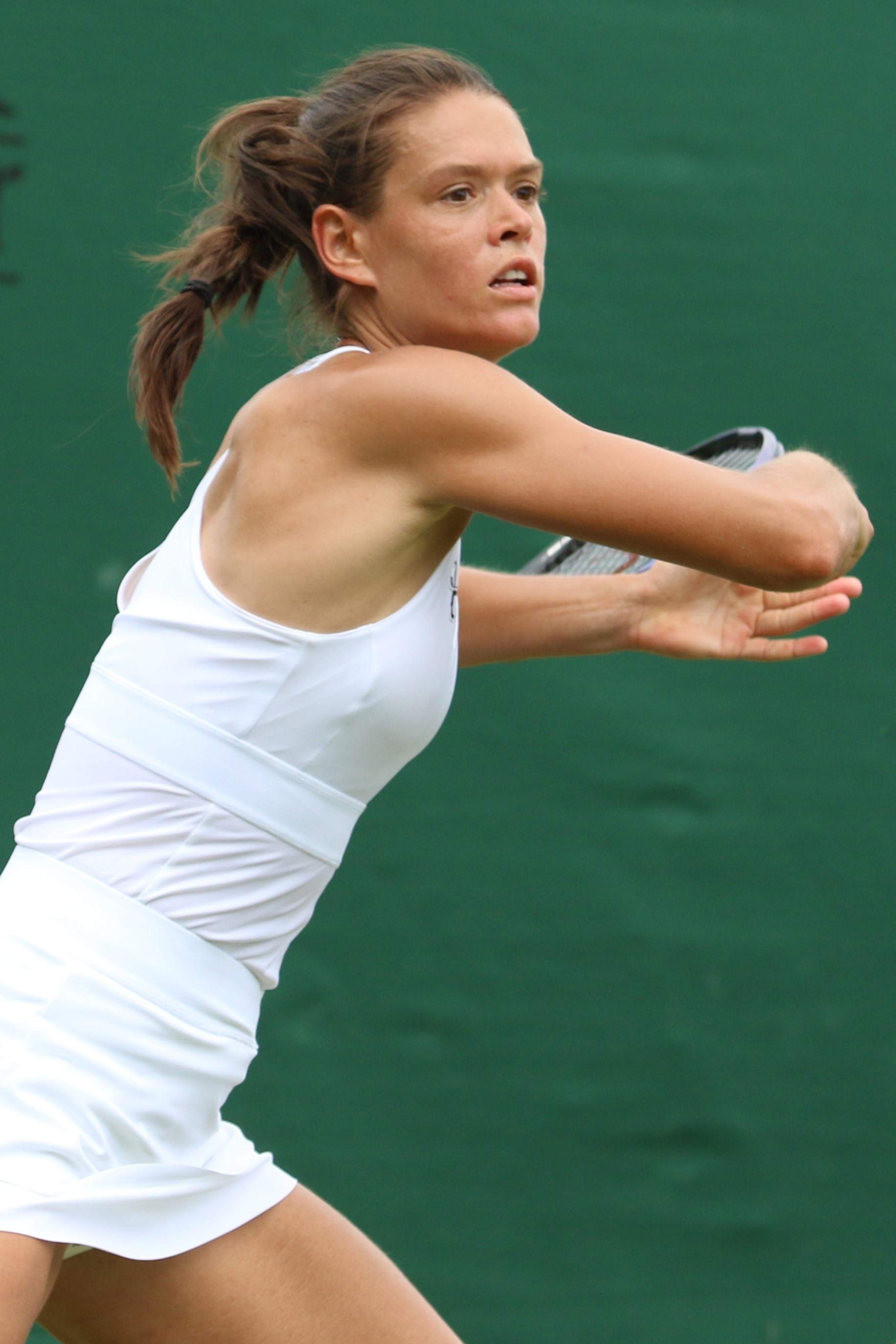
- Paquet at the 2023 Wimbledon Championships
- Country (sports): France
- Residence: Suresnes, France
- Born: 1 July 1994 (age 32) Versailles, France
- Height: 1.79 m (5 ft 10 in)
- Turned pro: 2010
- Plays: Right (two-handed backhand)
- Coach: Pierre Chamorel, Stéphane Huet, Stéphane Charret (2016-present)
- Prize money: US$ 2,131,131

Singles
- Career record: 426–436
- Career titles: 7 ITF
- Highest ranking: No. 96 (5 August 2024)
- Current ranking: No. 320 (28 September 2026)

Grand Slam singles results
- Australian Open: 1R (2021, 2025)
- French Open: 3R (2024)
- Wimbledon: 1R (2022)
- US Open: 1R (2024)

Doubles
- Career record: 57–112
- Career titles: 1 ITF
- Highest ranking: No. 247 (12 June 2017)
- Current ranking: No. 1,583 (28 September 2026)

Grand Slam doubles results
- French Open: 3R (2021)
- Wimbledon: 1R (2022)

Grand Slam mixed doubles results
- French Open: 2R (2017)
- Last updated on: 8 October 2026.

Chloé Paquet (French pronunciation: [klɔe pakɛ]; born 1 July 1994) is a French professional tennis player. She has achieved career-high WTA rankings of No. 96 in singles on 5 August 2024, and No. 247 in doubles on 12 June 2017.

== Personal life ==
Chloe Paquet is the cousin of professional tennis players Valentin Vacherot, Arthur Rinderknech, and Benjamin Balleret, and the niece of Virginie Paquet.

== Career ==
=== 2010–2013: ITF Circuit debut ===
Paquet made her debut on the ITF Women's Circuit in March 2010 at a tournament in Gonesse, France, where she only played in the singles draw losing in the second qualifying round. She played five tournaments on the 2010 ITF Women's Circuit.

=== 2014–15: Major debut in doubles ===
Paquet made her major debut at the 2014 French Open with her partner Alix Collombon having received a main-draw wildcard, but they lost in the first round to third seeds Ekaterina Makarova and Elena Vesnina.

Her major singles debut came at the 2015 French Open. After receiving a qualifying wildcard, she defeated fellow French player Lou Brouleau, before losing to Paula Kania in the second round of qualifying.

=== 2016–17: WTA Tour and major singles debuts ===
Paquet qualified to make her WTA Tour singles main-draw debut at the 2016 Copa Colsanitas but lost to Anne Schäfer. Paquet received again a qualifying wildcard from the 2016 French Open.

At the 2017 Mexican Open, she played her second WTA Tour singles match. However, after winning two qualifying matches, she lost in the first round of the main draw to No. 7 seed Lesia Tsurenko.

Paquet made her major singles main-draw debut at the 2017 French Open after receiving a wildcard. Ranked world No. 260, she defeated world No. 44, Kristýna Plíšková, before losing to 28th seed Caroline Garcia in the second round. Paquet's win over Plíšková was the first WTA Tour singles main-draw win of her career.

=== 2019–2023: First WTA Tour semifinal ===
Paquet reached her first semifinal on the WTA Tour in Strasbourg, losing there to fourth seed Caroline Garcia.

At the 2021 Australian Open, Paquet qualified for the first time at the event, but lost to fellow qualifier Mayar Sherif in the first round.

Partnering compatriot Clara Burel, she reached the third round in the doubles draw at the 2021 French Open.

In 2022, Paquet made her Wimbledon debut, losing to Irina Bara in the first round.

Paquet reached her first WTA 125 final at the 2023 Open Angers Arena Loire, losing to Clara Burel in three sets.

=== 2024–2025: French Open third round, second semifinal, top 100 ===
Paquet reached her second WTA 125 final at the 2024 Open de Saint-Malo, but lost to fellow French player Loïs Boisson. Having received a wildcard for the main draw of the 2024 French Open, Paquet reached the third round for the first time at a major with wins over Diana Shnaider and 32nd seed Kateřina Siniaková, before losing to fifth seed Markéta Vondroušová in the third round.

She reached her first WTA Tour semifinal in five years and second of her career at the 2024 Iași Open, losing to fifth seed Elina Avanesyan. As a result, she entered the top 100 for the first time at age 30, on 29 July 2024.

Paquet received the French Tennis Federation reciprocal wildcard for the singles main draw at the 2025 Australian Open. She lost to Cristina Bucșa in the first round.

She made it into her third WTA 125 singles final at the 2025 Trophée Clarins, but was again unable to claim her maiden trophy, losing to second seed Katie Boulter, in three sets.

== Performance timelines ==
Key
W	F	SF	QF	#R	RR	Q#	P#	DNQ	A	Z#	PO	G	S	B	NMS	NTI	P	NH

(W) winner; (F) finalist; (SF) semifinalist; (QF) quarterfinalist; (#R) rounds 4, 3, 2, 1; (RR) round-robin stage; (Q#) qualification round; (P#) preliminary round; (DNQ) did not qualify; (A) absent; (Z#) Davis/Fed Cup Zonal Group (with number indication) or (PO) play-off; (G) gold, (S) silver or (B) bronze Olympic/Paralympic medal; (NMS) not a Masters tournament; (NTI) not a Tier I tournament; (P) postponed; (NH) not held; (SR) strike rate (events won / competed); (W–L) win–loss record.
To avoid confusion and double counting, these charts are updated at the conclusion of a tournament or when the player's participation has ended.

Only main-draw results in WTA Tour, Grand Slam tournaments, Fed Cup/Billie Jean King Cup and Olympic Games are included in win–loss records.

=== Singles ===
Current through the 2026 US Open.

Tournament	2015	2016	2017	2018	2019	2020	2021	2022	2023	2024	2025	2026	SR	W–L
Grand Slam tournaments
Australian Open	A	A	A	A	Q1	Q1	1R	Q1	Q1	Q1	1R	Q2	0 / 2	0–2
French Open	Q2	Q1	2R	1R	1R	1R	1R	1R	Q2	3R	1R	Q1	0 / 8	3–8
Wimbledon	A	A	A	A	Q1	NH	A	1R	Q2	Q2	Q1	A	0 / 1	0–1
US Open	A	A	Q1	A	Q1	A	Q1	Q3	Q1	1R	A	A	0 / 1	0–1
Win–loss	0–0	0–0	1–1	0–1	0–1	0–1	0–2	0–2	0–0	2–2	0–2	0–0	0 / 12	3–12
WTA 1000
Dubai / Qatar Open (Note: The first Premier 5 event of the year has switched back and forth between the Dubai Tennis Championships and the Qatar Ladies Open since 2009. Dubai was classified as a Premier 5 event from 2009 to 2011 before being succeeded by Doha for the 2012–2014 period. In 2015, Dubai regained its Premier 5 status while Doha was demoted to Premier status. The Premier 5 tournaments were reclassified as WTA 1000 tournaments in 2021.)	A	A	A	A	Q1	A	A	A	A	A	Q1	A	0 / 0	0–0
Indian Wells Open	A	A	A	A	A	NH	A	Q2	A	A	A	A	0 / 0	0–0
Miami Open	A	A	A	A	A	NH	A	Q1	A	A	A	A	0 / 0	0–0
Madrid Open	A	A	A	A	A	NH	A	Q1	A	A	Q1	A	0 / 0	0–0
Italian Open	A	A	A	A	A	A	A	A	A	A	Q1	A	0 / 0	0–0
Canadian Open	A	A	A	A	A	NH	A	A	A	Q2	A	A	0 / 0	0–0
Cincinnati Open	A	A	A	A	A	A	A	A	A	Q1	A	A	0 / 0	0–0
Wuhan Open	A	A	A	A	A	NH			A		A		0 / 0	0–0
China Open	A	A	A	A	A	NH			A	A	Q1	A	0 / 0	0–0
Career statistics
Tournaments	0	1	2	2	8	3	4	11	2				Career total: 33	
Overall win–loss	0–0	0–1	1–2	0–2	6–8	0–3	0–4	2–11	1–2				0 / 33	10–33
Year-end ranking	251	309	266	227	167	187	123	155	188	111	246		$1,086,886	

=== Doubles ===
Tournament	2014	2015	2016	2017	2018	2019	2020	2021	2022	SR	W–L
Australian Open	A	A	A	A	A	A	A	A	A	0 / 0	0–0
French Open	1R	1R	1R	2R	A	1R	1R	3R	1R	0 / 8	3–8
Wimbledon	A	A	A	A	A	A	NH	A	1R	0 / 1	0–1
US Open	A	A	A	A	A	A	A	A	A	0 / 0	0–0
Win–loss	0–1	0–1	0–1	1–1	0–0	0–1	0–1	2–1	0–2	0 / 9	3–9

== WTA 125 finals ==
=== Singles: 3 (3 runner-ups) ===
Result	W–L	Date	Tournament	Surface	Opponent	Score
Loss	0–1	Dec 2023	Open Angers, France	Hard (i)	(France) Clara Burel	6–3, 4–6, 2–6
Loss	0–2	May 2024	Open de Saint-Malo, France	Clay	(France) Loïs Boisson	6–4, 6–7^{(3–7)}, 3–6
Loss	0–3	May 2025	Trophée Clarins, France	Clay	(United Kingdom) Katie Boulter	6–3, 2–6, 3–6

=== Doubles: 1 (runner-up) ===
Result	W–L	Date	Tournament	Surface	Partner	Opponents	Score
Loss	0–1	Nov 2017	Open de Limoges, France	Hard (i)	(France) Pauline Parmentier	(Russia) Valeria Savinykh (Belgium) Maryna Zanevska	0–6, 2–6

== ITF Circuit finals ==
=== Singles: 17 (7 titles, 10 runner-ups) ===
Legend W80 tournaments (1–0) W60 tournaments (1–2) W25 tournaments (4–5) W10/15 tournaments (1–3)	Finals by surface Hard (3–2) Clay (4–8)

Result	W–L	Date	Tournament	Tier	Surface	Opponent	Score
Win	1–0	Jun 2014	ITF Minsk, Belarus	W10	Clay	(Belarus) Lidziya Marozava	6–2, 6–4
Loss	1–1	Sep 2014	ITF Madrid, Spain	W10	Hard	(Ukraine) Elizaveta Ianchuk	2–6, 3–6
Loss	1–2	Jun 2015	ITF Périgueux, France	W25	Clay	(France) Mathilde Johansson	4–6, 2–6
Loss	1–3	Aug 2015	ITF Fleurus, Belgium	W15	Clay	(Belgium) Elyne Boeykens	4–6, 2–6
Loss	1–4	Sep 2016	ITF Schoonhoven, Netherlands	W10	Clay	(United States) Chiara Scholl	1–6, 4–6
Loss	1–5	Mar 2017	ITF Pula, Italy	W25	Clay	(Ukraine) Katarina Zavatska	1–6, 3–6
Loss	1–6	Apr 2018	Nana Trophy Tunis, Tunisia	W25	Clay	(Russia) Valentina Ivakhnenko	2–6, 2–6
Loss	1–7	Aug 2018	ITF Las Palmas, Spain	W25	Clay	(Turkey) Başak Eraydın	2–6, 1–6
Win	2–7	Oct 2018	Open de Touraine, France	W25	Hard (i)	(France) Myrtille Georges	7–6^{(5)}, 6–2
Loss	2–8	Jan 2020	ITF Nonthaburi, Thailand	W25	Hard	(India) Ankita Raina	3–6, 5–7
Win	3–8	Jun 2021	ITF Wrocław, Poland	W25	Clay	(Turkey) İpek Öz	4–6, 6–3, 6–3
Win	4–8	Jul 2021	ITF Kyiv, Ukraine	W25	Clay	(Hungary) Fanny Stollár	7–6^{(3)}, 3–6, 6–4
Loss	4–9	Aug 2021	Kozerki Open, Poland	W60	Clay	(Georgia (country)) Ekaterine Gorgodze	6–7^{(9)}, 6–0, 4–6
Win	5–9	Oct 2021	ITF Netanya, Israel	W25	Hard	(United Kingdom) Matilda Mutavdzic	6–3, 6–3
Win	6–9	Oct 2021	Internationaux de Poitiers, France	W80	Hard (i)	(Switzerland) Simona Waltert	6–4, 6–3
Loss	6–10	Jul 2022	Internazionale di Roma, Italy	W60	Clay	(Croatia) Tara Würth	3–6, 4–6
Win	7–10	Sep 2023	ITF Collonge-Bellerive, Switzerland	W60	Clay	(Italy) Lucrezia Stefanini	6–2, 6–1

=== Doubles: 5 (1 title, 4 runner-ups) ===
Legend W25 tournaments W10/15 tournaments (1–4)	Finals by surface Hard (0–4) Clay (1–0)

Result	W–L	Date	Tournament	Tier	Surface	Partner	Opponents	Score
Loss	0–1	Dec 2012	ITF Djibouti City, Djibouti	W10	Hard	(France) Amandine Hesse	(Ukraine) Diana Bogoliy (Russia) Yana Sizikova	3–6, 6–3, [8–10]
Loss	0–2	Dec 2012	ITF Djibouti City	W10	Hard	(France) Amandine Hesse	(Ukraine) Diana Bogoliy (Russia) Yana Sizikova	7–5, 4–6, [4–10]
Loss	0–3	Feb 2013	ITF Sharm El Sheikh, Egypt	W10	Hard	(France) Clothilde de Bernardi	(Slovenia) Anja Prislan (Germany) Jasmin Steinherr	6–3, 2–6, [4–10]
Loss	0–4	Jan 2014	ITF Saint Martin, Guadeloupe	W10	Hard	(France) Léa Tholey	(Canada) Khristina Blajkevitch (France) Brandy Mina	5–7, 2–6
Win	1–4	Jan 2017	ITF Hammamet, Tunisia	W15	Clay	(Spain) María Teresa Torró Flor	(France) Joséphine Boualem (Austria) Julia Grabher	6–4, 6–4
