= Clara Burel =

French tennis player (born 2001)

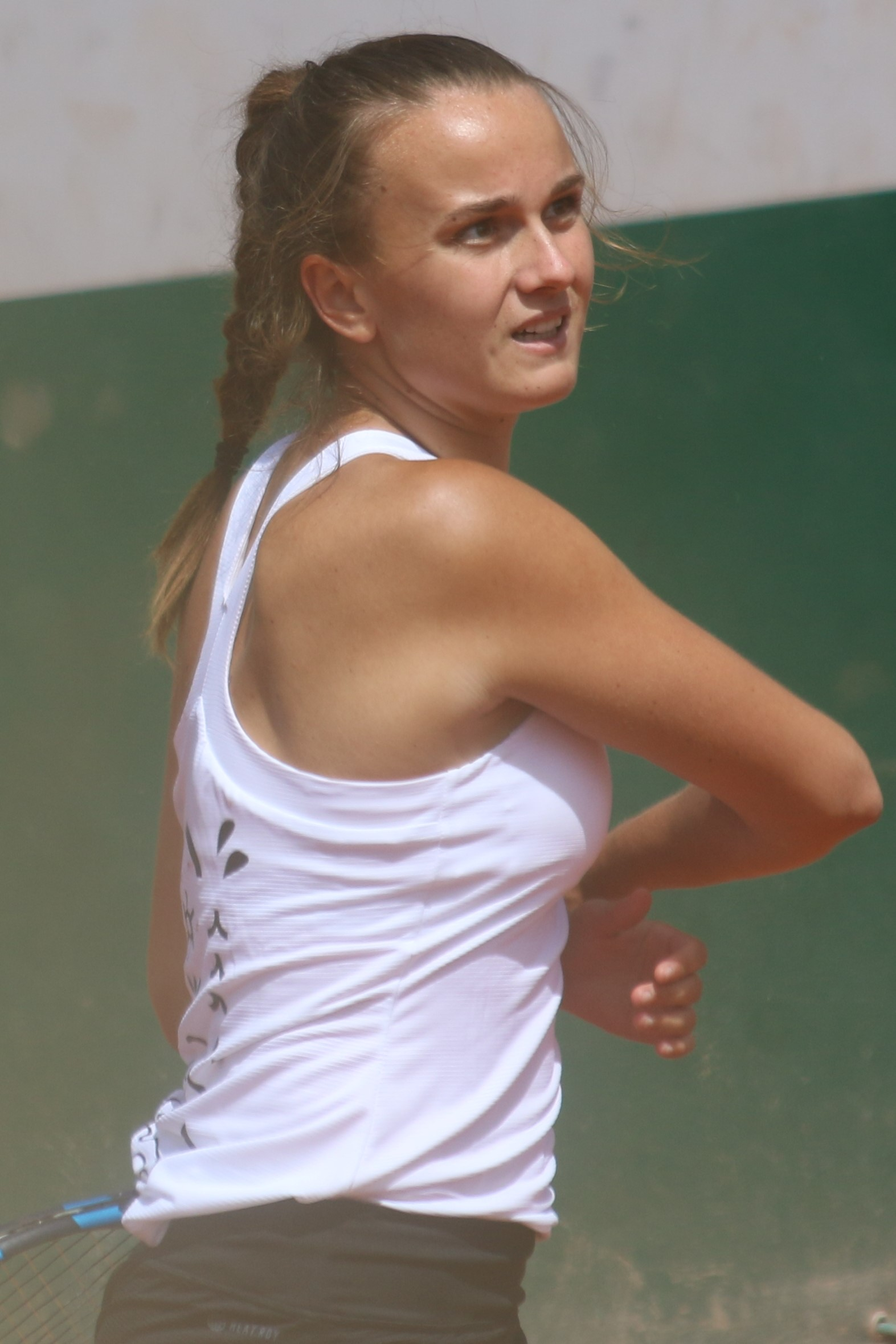
- Burel at the 2022 French Open
- Country (sports): France
- Residence: Perros-Guirec, France
- Born: 24 March 2001 (age 25) Rennes, France
- Height: 1.76 m (5 ft 9 in)
- Plays: Right (two-handed backhand)
- Prize money: $2,762,963

Singles
- Career record: 196–140
- Career titles: 3 WTA 125
- Highest ranking: No. 42 (10 June 2024)
- Current ranking: No. 156 (19 October 2026)

Grand Slam singles results
- Australian Open: 3R (2024)
- French Open: 3R (2020)
- Wimbledon: 2R (2021, 2024)
- US Open: 3R (2022, 2023)

Other tournaments
- Olympic Games: 2R (2024)

Doubles
- Career record: 9–30
- Career titles: 0
- Highest ranking: No. 246 (9 May 2022)
- Current ranking: No. 1,614 (19 October 2026)

Grand Slam doubles results
- Australian Open: 1R (2022, 2024)
- French Open: 3R (2021)
- Wimbledon: 1R (2022)
- US Open: 1R (2023, 2024)

Other doubles tournaments
- Olympic Games: 1R (2024)

Grand Slam mixed doubles results
- French Open: 2R (2022, 2024)
Medal record
Representing France
Youth Olympic Games
Silver medal – second place	2018 Buenos Aires	Girls' singles
Bronze medal – third place	2018 Buenos Aires	Mixed doubles
- Last updated on: 21 October 2026.

Clara Burel (French pronunciation: [klaʁa byʁɛl]; born 24 March 2001) is a French professional tennis player. She has a career-high WTA singles ranking of world No. 42, achieved on 10 June 2024 and a best in doubles of No. 246, reached on 9 May 2022. She has won three WTA 125 titles in singles.

== Early life ==
Clara Burel was born on 24 March 2001 in Rennes, France, to Vincent and Stéphanie Burel. She grew up in Louannec, in the Côtes-d'Armor department of Brittany, with her two sisters, Lola and Jade.

Burel began playing tennis at the age of six at the local tennis club in Louannec, where she was initially coached by Georges Paysant. She subsequently trained in nearby Lannion under Olivier Roudet, who coached her from the ages of eight to thirteen. At nine, she began training alongside boys to face stronger competition.

In 2013, Burel briefly joined a sports-study programme in Rennes but returned to Lannion after three months. She subsequently moved to Paris in 2014 to continue her training at the INSEP before joining the French Tennis Federation's National Training Centre (CNE). She completed her French Baccalauréat in 2018 while competing on the junior tennis circuit.

== Juniors ==
In 2013, at the age of twelve, Burel won the French national championship in her age category.

In 2018, she reached the girls' singles finals at both the Australian Open and the US Open, losing to Liang En-shuo and Wang Xiyu, respectively. At the 2018 Summer Youth Olympics in Buenos Aires, Burel won the silver medal in girls' singles after losing the final to Kaja Juvan. She also won the bronze medal in mixed doubles, partnering compatriot Hugo Gaston.

In October 2018, Burel won the ITF Junior Masters in Chengdu, China, defeating Camila Osorio in the final. The victory made her the first French player to win the event and propelled her to the world No. 1 position in the ITF junior rankings on 29 October 2018. She finished the season as the year-end junior world No. 1 and was named the 2018 ITF Junior World Champion.

== Career ==
=== 2018: First ITF Circuit final ===
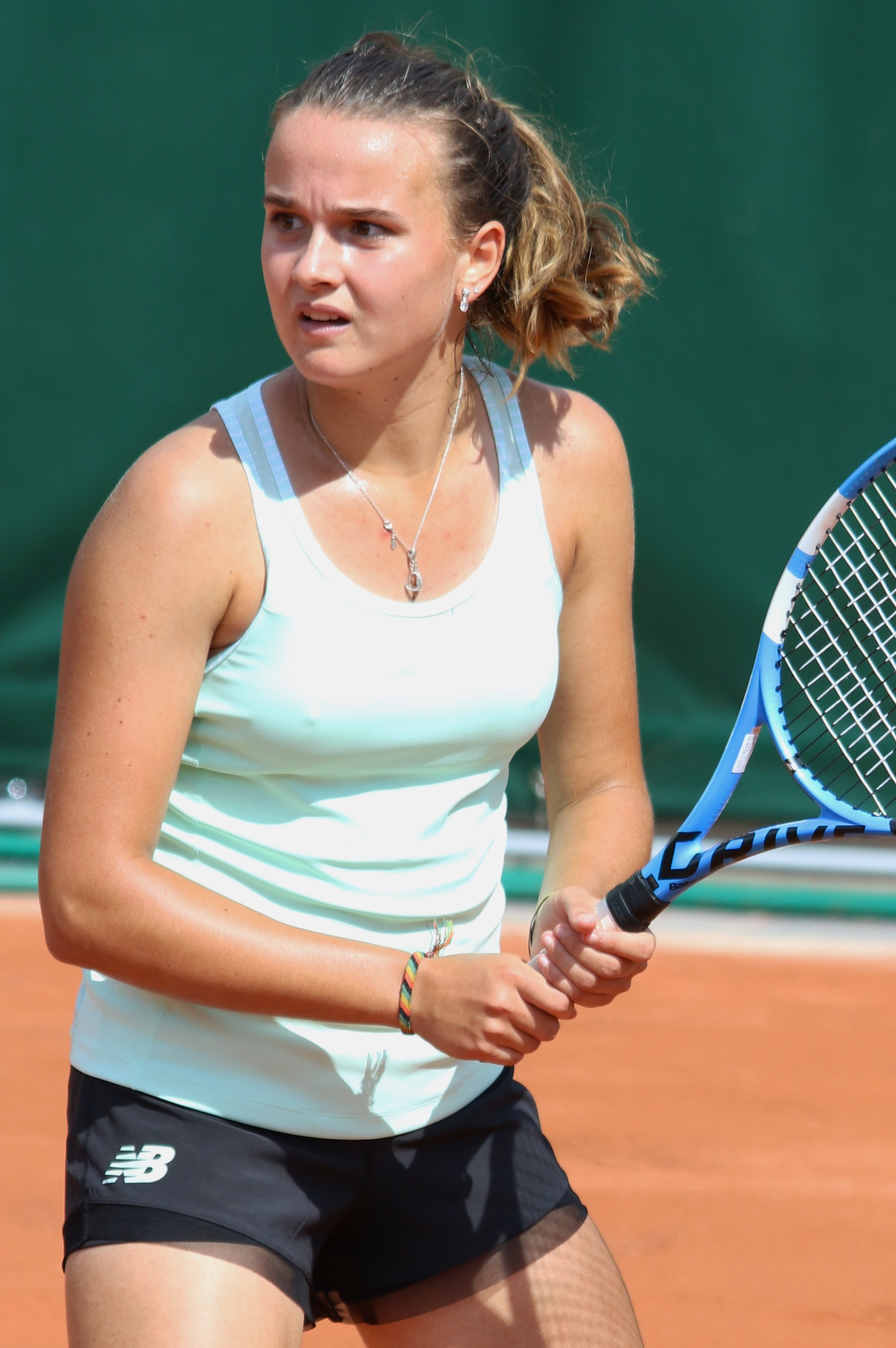
Burel at the 2018 French Open

In February 2018, following her appearance in the Australian Open junior singles final, Burel was selected as a reserve for the French Fed Cup team during its first-round tie against Belgium.

In September, she reached her first professional singles final at the $25,000 ITF Women's Circuit tournament in Clermont-Ferrand, losing to Lesley Kerkhove in three sets.

=== 2019–2020: Major debut, French Open third round ===
Burel was a wildcard entrant at the 2019 Australian Open where she lost in the first round to Carla Suárez Navarro. In March 2020, Burel was given a wildcard entry into the Lyon Open but she lost in the first round to Jil Teichmann.

In September 2020 in Strasbourg, she knocked out Kateryna Bondarenko, before falling in the second round to Zhang Shuai. At the French Open the following week, she again entered thanks to a wildcard and defeated Arantxa Rus in the first round and Kaja Juvan to reach the third round of a major for the first time in her career, becoming the youngest Frenchwoman since 18-year-old Alizé Cornet did so in 2008. Burel lost to Zhang Shuai for the second successive tournament.

=== 2021: WTA Tour final, Wimbledon and top 100 debuts ===
Burel qualified for the Australian Open, but lost to Alison Van Uytvanck in the first round. She made her top 200 debut on 8 March 2021, raising 37 positions to world No. 181, following reaching the quarterfinals in Lyon.

She also qualified for Wimbledon, making her first appearance in the main draw at the grass-court Grand Slam, where she defeated Ellen Perez, before losing in the second round to Kaja Juvan.

Burel reached her first WTA Tour final at the Ladies Open Lausanne, losing to Tamara Zidanšek in three sets. As a result, she made her top 100 debut, at world No. 98, on 19 July 2021.

She made her WTA 1000 debut at the Canadian Open as a qualifier but lost to 13th seed Ons Jabeur in the first round.

=== 2022: Top 75, first WTA 1000 win, US Open third round ===
Burel reached a new career-high WTA singles ranking at No. 74 on 21 February 2022. She recorded her first WTA 1000 win at the Miami Open against qualifier Magdalena Fręch, but then lost to 28th seed Petra Kvitová in the second round.

Burel qualified for the US Open and reached the third round defeating 25th seed Elena Rybakina, and Alison Van Uytvanck, before losing to sixth seed Aryna Sabalenka.

=== 2023: Maiden WTA 125 title ===
Burel qualified for the Australian Open and defeated wildcard Talia Gibson in the first round, her first win at this major. In April, she also qualified into the main draw of the WTA 1000 Madrid Open, losing to Camila Osorio in the first round. She lost to 20th seed Barbora Krejčíková in the second round.

She reached the final at the Ladies Open Lausanne, losing to Elisabetta Cocciaretto. Burel won her first WTA 125 tournament at the Open Angers in December, defeating compatriot Chloé Paquet in three sets in the final.

=== 2024: Three WTA Tour quarters, top 10 win & top 50 ===
Burel reached the third round at the Australian Open for the first time at this major defeating Aleksandra Krunić and fifth seed Jessica Pegula, her first top-10 win, before losing to Océane Dodin. As a result, she recorded a new career-high singles ranking of world No. 44, reaching the top 50 for the first time on 5 February 2024.

At the Upper Austria Ladies Linz, she reached the quarterfinals defeating Sinja Kraus and Kateřina Siniaková, before losing to the third seed, Donna Vekić.

At the newly upgraded WTA 500 in Strasbourg, Burel also reached the quarterfinals defeating wildcard player Karolina Plíšková and seventh seed and defending champion, Elina Svitolina, her second career top-20 win, before also losing to third seed Danielle Collins.

Burel recorded a first round win over Eva Lys at Wimbledon, losing her next match to qualifier Sonay Kartal.

At the Cleveland Open, she reached the quarterfinals defeating lucky loser Elvina Kalieva and eighth seed Sofia Kenin. Burel lost to top seed Beatriz Haddad Maia. Moving on to the US Open, she defeated former champion Sloane Stephens, but lost to 20th seed Victoria Azarenka in the second round.

On her debut at the China Open, Burel recorded a first-round victory over lucky loser Tamara Korpatsch, before being defeated by fourth seed Coco Gauff in the second round.

=== 2025: ACL injury ===
Having missed the first two months of the season, Burel returned in March at the WTA 125 event in Antalya, defeating seventh seed Nuria Párrizas Díaz Darja Semeņistaja and Chloé Paquet to make it through to the semifinals. She retired due to a back injury after losing the first set of her last four match against sixth seed and eventual champion Anca Todoni.

The following month, while playing for France in their BJK Cup Europe/Africa Zone tie with Turkey, Burel suffered a torn anterior cruciate ligament (ACL) in her right knee when she fell during the first set of her match against Ayla Aksu. In November, after having surgery and extensive rehabilitation, she revealed in a post on social media that she had resumed on-court practice.

=== 2026: Comeback, two WTA 125 titles ===
A year after her last match, Burel returned to the tennis courts in April at the WTA 125 Saint-Malo Open, losing to fourth seed Viktorija Golubic in the first round. She was given a wildcard entry into the main draw at the French Open, again losing in the first round, this time to Katie Volynets.

In June, Burel won her first title since 2023 at an ITF event in Nice, defeating fellow French player Jenny Lim in three sets in the final. The following month, at the Iași Open, she recorded wins over lucky loser Varvara Lepchenko, and eighth seed Elsa Jacquemot to reach her first WTA Tour quarterfinal since August 2024, at which point she lost to third seed Oleksandra Oliynykova.

In September, Burel won her second WTA 125 singles title at the Open Internacional de Valencia, defeating Alicia Herrero Liñana in the final. The next month, she defeated sixth seed Leyre Romero Gormaz in the final of the Lisboa Belém Open to claim her third WTA 125 title and return to the top 200 at world No. 156 as a result.

== Performance timelines ==
Key
W	F	SF	QF	#R	RR	Q#	P#	DNQ	A	Z#	PO	G	S	B	NMS	NTI	P	NH

(W) winner; (F) finalist; (SF) semifinalist; (QF) quarterfinalist; (#R) rounds 4, 3, 2, 1; (RR) round-robin stage; (Q#) qualification round; (P#) preliminary round; (DNQ) did not qualify; (A) absent; (Z#) Davis/Fed Cup Zonal Group (with number indication) or (PO) play-off; (G) gold, (S) silver or (B) bronze Olympic/Paralympic medal; (NMS) not a Masters tournament; (NTI) not a Tier I tournament; (P) postponed; (NH) not held; (SR) strike rate (events won / competed); (W–L) win–loss record.
To avoid confusion and double counting, these charts are updated at the conclusion of a tournament or when the player's participation has ended.

Only main-draw results in WTA Tour, Grand Slam tournaments, Billie Jean King Cup, United Cup, Hopman Cup and Olympic Games are included in win–loss records.

=== Singles ===
Current through the 2026 US Open.

Tournament	2018	2019	2020	2021	2022	2023	2024	2025	2026	SR	W–L	Win %
Grand Slam tournaments
Australian Open	A	1R	A	1R	1R	2R	3R	A	A	0 / 5	3–5	38%
French Open	Q1	A	3R	1R	1R	1R	1R	A	1R	0 / 6	2–6	25%
Wimbledon	A	A	NH	2R	1R	Q2	2R	A	A	0 / 3	2–3	40%
US Open	A	A	A	1R	3R	3R	2R	A	Q2	0 / 4	5–4	56%
Win–Loss	0–0	0–1	2–1	1–4	2–4	3–3	4–4	0–0	0–1	0 / 18	12–18	40%
National representation
Summer Olympics	NH			A	NH		2R	NH		0 / 1	1–1	50%
Billie Jean King Cup (Note: Formerly known as Fed Cup until 2020.)	A	A	RR (Note: Edition is split into the two years due to COVID-19.)		A	RR		2–0		0 / 2	3–0	100%
WTA 1000
Qatar Open (Note: The first Premier 5 event of the year has switched back and forth between the Dubai Tennis Championships and the Qatar Ladies Open since 2009. Dubai was classified as a Premier 5 event from 2009 to 2011 before being succeeded by Doha for the 2012–2014 period. In 2015, Dubai regained its Premier 5 status while Doha was demoted to Premier status. The Premier 5 tournaments were reclassified as WTA 1000 tournaments in 2021.)	A	NMS	A	NMS	A	NMS	A	A	A	0 / 0	0–0	–
Dubai	NMS	A	NMS	A	NMS	Q1	1R	A	A	0 / 1	0–1	0%
Indian Wells Open	A	A	NH	A	1R	A	2R	A	A	0 / 2	1–2	33%
Miami Open	A	A	NH	A	2R	A	1R	A	A	0 / 2	1–2	33%
Madrid Open	A	A	NH	A	Q2	1R	1R	A	A	0 / 2	0–2	0%
Italian Open	A	A	A	A	A	A	1R	A	A	0 / 1	0–1	0%
Canadian Open	A	A	NH	1R	A	A	A	A	A	0 / 1	0–1	0%
Cincinnati Open	A	A	A	A	A	A	1R	A	A	0 / 1	0–1	0%
Guadalajara Open	NH				A	A	NTI	A	A	0 / 0	0–0	–
Wuhan Open	A	A	NH				1R	A	A	0 / 1	0–1	0%
China Open	A	A	NH			A	2R	A	A	0 / 1	1–1	50%
Win–Loss	0–0	0–0	0–0	0–1	1–2	0–1	2–8	0–0	0–0	0 / 12	3–12	20%
Career statistics
	2018	2019	2020	2021	2022	2023	2024	2025	2026	SR	W–L	Win %
Tournaments	0	1	3	12	11	10	22	0		Career total: 59		
Titles	0	0	0	0	0	0	0	0	0	Career total: 0		
Finals	0	0	0	1	0	1	0	0	0	Career total: 2		
Hard win–loss	0–0	0–1	0–1	4–8	4–5	7–5		0–0		0 / 20	15–20	43%
Clay win–loss	0–0	0–0	3–2	5–3	3–5	9–5		0–0		0 / 15	20–15	57%
Grass win–loss	0–0	0–0	0–0	1–1	0–1	0–0		0–0		0 / 2	1–2	33%
Overall win–loss	0–0	0–1	3–3	10–12	7–11	16–10	16-22	0–0		0 / 59	52–59	47%
Year-end ranking	612	871	235	77	135	61	74	654		$2,762,963		

=== Doubles ===
Current through the 2024 US Open.

Tournament	2018	2019	2020	2021	2022	2023	2024	SR	W–L	Win %
Grand Slam tournaments
Australian Open	A	A	A	A	1R	A	1R	0 / 2	0–2	0%
French Open	1R	A	1R	3R	1R	1R	1R	0 / 6	2–6	25%
Wimbledon	A	A	NH	A	1R	A	A	0 / 1	0–1	0%
US Open	A	A	A	A	A	1R	1R	0 / 2	0–2	0%
Win–Loss	0–1	0–0	0–1	2–1	0–3	0–2	0–3	0 / 11	2–11	15%
National representation
Billie Jean King Cup	A	A	RR		A	RR		0 / 1	0–3	0%
Career statistics
Tournaments	1	0	2	2	4	2	1	Career total: 12		
Titles	0	0	0	0	0	0		Career total: 0		
Finals	0	0	0	0	0	0		Career total: 0		
Overall win–loss	0–1	0–0	0–2	2–4	0–4	0–2	0–1	0 / 12	2–14	13%
Year-end ranking	1121	n/a	741	265	1010	644	660			

== WTA Tour finals ==
=== Singles: 2 (2 runner-ups) ===
Legend WTA 250 (0–2)	Finals by surface Clay (0–2)	Finals by setting Outdoor (0–2)

Result	W–L	Date	Tournament	Tier	Surface	Opponent	Score
Loss	0–1	Jul 2021	Ladies Open Lausanne, Switzerland	WTA 250	Clay	(Slovenia) Tamara Zidanšek	6–4, 6–7^{(5–7)}, 1–6
Loss	0–2	Jul 2023	Ladies Open Lausanne, Switzerland	WTA 250	Clay	(Italy) Elisabetta Cocciaretto	5–7, 6–4, 4–6

== WTA 125 finals ==
=== Singles: 3 (titles) ===
Result	W–L	Date	Tournament	Surface	Opponent	Score
Win	1–0	Dec 2023	Open Angers, France	Hard (i)	(France) Chloé Paquet	3–6, 6–4, 6–2
Win	2–0	Sep 2026	Internacional de Valencia, Spain	Clay	(Spain) Alicia Herrero Liñana	4–6, 6–0, 6–2
Win	3–0	Oct 2026	Lisboa Belém Open, Portugal	Clay	(Spain) Leyre Romero Gormaz	6–4, 6–3

== ITF Circuit finals ==
=== Singles: 11 (5 titles, 6 runner-ups) ===
Legend $80,000 tournaments (0–1) $60,000 tournaments (2–1) $40,000 tournaments (0–1) $25,000 tournaments (3–2) $15,000 tournaments (0–1)	Finals by surface Hard (2–3) Clay (3–3)

Result	W–L	Date	Tournament	Tier	Surface	Opponent	Score
Loss	0–1	Sep 2018	ITF Clermont-Ferrand, France	W25	Hard (i)	(Netherlands) Lesley Kerkhove	3–6, 6–4, 4–6
Loss	0–2	Nov 2019	ITF Monastir, Tunisia	W15	Hard	(France) Carole Monnet	2–6, 0–6
Win	1–2	Feb 2020	Open de Grenoble, France	W25	Hard (i)	(Luxembourg) Eléonora Molinaro	5–7, 7–5, 6–2
Loss	1–3	Feb 2021	ITF Poitiers, France	W25	Hard (i)	(Ukraine) Daria Snigur	3–6, 6–2, 5–7
Loss	1–4	Apr 2021	Oeiras Ladies Open, Portugal	W60	Clay	(Slovenia) Polona Hercog	w/o
Win	2–4	May 2021	Open Saint-Gaudens, France	W60	Clay	(Romania) Alexandra Dulgheru	6–2, 1–6, 6–2
Loss	2–5	Sep 2021	Wiesbaden Open, Germany	W80	Clay	(Hungary) Anna Bondár	2–6, 4–6
Win	3–5	Oct 2021	ITF Cherbourg, France	W25+H	Hard (i)	(France) Émeline Dartron	6–4, 6–2
Win	4–5	Jul 2023	Open de Montpellier, France	W60	Clay	(Australia) Astra Sharma	6–3, 7–5
Win	5–5	Jun 2026	ITF Nice, France	W25+H	Clay	(France) Jenny Lim	6–1, 3–6, 6–3
Loss	5–6	Aug 2026	ITF Saint-Palais-sur-Mer, France	W50	Clay	(France) Fiona Ferro	6–2, 3–6, 5–7

== Junior Grand Slam tournament finals ==
=== Singles: 2 (runner-ups) ===
Result	Year	Tournament	Surface	Opponent	Score
Loss	2018	Australian Open	Hard	(Chinese Taipei) Liang En-shuo	3–6, 4–6
Loss	2018	US Open	Hard	(China) Wang Xiyu	6–7^{(4–7)}, 2–6

== Wins against top-10 players ==
- Burel has a 1–4 record against players who were, at the time the match was played, ranked in the top 10.

Season	2024	Total
Wins	1	1

#	Opponent	Rank	Event	Surface	Round	Score	Rk	Ref
2024
1.	(United States) Jessica Pegula	5	Australian Open	Hard	2R	6–4, 6–2	51	

== Notes ==
Awards
Preceded by (United States) Whitney Osuigwe	ITF Junior World Champion; 2018	Succeeded by (France) Diane Parry
