= Open Angers Arena Loire =

Open Angers Loire Trélazé
- 2025 Open Angers Arena Loire

WTA 125
- Event name: Open Angers Loire Trélazé
- Tour: WTA Tour
- Founded: 2021
- Location: Angers; France
- Venue: Arena Loire Trélazé
- Category: WTA 125
- Surface: Hard (Indoor)
- Draw: 32S / 6D
- Prize money: US$115,000 (2025)
- Website: openangersloire.com/

Current champions (2025)
- Women's singles: (Uzbekistan) Kamilla Rakhimova
- Women's doubles: (Germany) Tamara Korpatsch (France) Jessika Ponchet

The Open Angers Loire Trélazé is a WTA 125-level professional women's tennis tournament. It takes place on indoor hardcourts at Arena Loire Trélazé in the city of Angers in France. Nicolas Mahut is the tournament director since 2021.

== Results ==
=== Singles ===
Year	Champion	Runner-up	Score
2025	(Uzbekistan) Kamilla Rakhimova	(Germany) Tamara Korpatsch	6–3, 7–6^{(7–4)}
2024	(United States) Alycia Parks (2)	(Switzerland) Belinda Bencic	7–6^{(7–4)}, 3–6, 6–0
2023	(France) Clara Burel	(France) Chloé Paquet	3–6, 6–4, 6–2
2022	(United States) Alycia Parks	(Germany) Anna-Lena Friedsam	6–4, 4–6, 6–4
2021	(Russia) Vitalia Diatchenko	(China) Zhang Shuai	6–0, 6–4

=== Doubles ===
Year	Champions	Runners-up	Score
2025	(Germany) Tamara Korpatsch (France) Jessika Ponchet	(Czech Republic) Jesika Malečková (Czech Republic) Miriam Škoch	6–3, 6–2
2024	(Romania) Monica Niculescu (2) (Romania) Elena-Gabriela Ruse	(Switzerland) Belinda Bencic (Switzerland) Céline Naef	6–3, 6–4
2023	(Spain) Cristina Bucșa (Romania) Monica Niculescu	(Kazakhstan) Anna Danilina; Alexandra Panova	6–1, 6–3
2022	(United States) Alycia Parks (China) Zhang Shuai	(Czech Republic) Miriam Kolodziejová (Czech Republic) Markéta Vondroušová	6–2, 6–2
2021	(Slovakia) Tereza Mihalíková (Belgium) Greet Minnen	(Romania) Monica Niculescu (Russia) Vera Zvonareva	4–6, 6–1, [10–8]
