= Lyon Open =

Lyon Open may refer to:

- ATP Lyon Open, a men's professional tennis tournament
- WTA Lyon Open, a women's professional tennis tournament
