= 2023 Western & Southern Open =

- Date: 13–20 August
- Edition: 122nd (men) / 95th (women)
- Category: ATP Tour Masters 1000 (men); WTA 1000 (women)
- Surface: Hard
- Location: Mason, Ohio, U.S.
- Venue: Lindner Family Tennis Center

Champions

Men's singles
- (Serbia) Novak Djokovic

Women's singles
- (United States) Coco Gauff

Men's doubles
- (Argentina) Máximo González / (Argentina) Andrés Molteni

Women's doubles
- (United States) Alycia Parks / (United States) Taylor Townsend
- Cincinnati Open

The 2023 Western & Southern Open was a combined men's and women's tennis tournament played on outdoor hard courts from 13 to 20 August 2023. It was a mandatory Masters 1000 tournament on the 2023 ATP Tour and a non-mandatory WTA 1000 tournament on the 2023 WTA Tour. The 2023 tournament was the 122nd men's edition and the 95th women's edition of the Cincinnati Open and took place at the Lindner Family Tennis Center in Mason, Ohio, a northern suburb of Cincinnati, in the United States.

== Points and prize money ==
=== Point distribution ===
Event	W	F	SF	QF	Round of 16	Round of 32	Round of 64	Q	Q2	Q1
Men's singles	1000	600	360	180	90	45	10	25	16	0
Men's doubles	1000	600	360	180	90	0	—N/a	—N/a	—N/a	—N/a
Women's singles	900	585	350	190	105	60	1	30	20	1
Women's doubles	900	585	350	190	105	5	—N/a	—N/a	—N/a	—N/a

=== Prize money ===
Event	W	F	SF	QF	Round of 16	Round of 32	Round of 64	Q2	Q1
Men's singles	$1,019,335	$556,630	$304,375	$166,020	$88,805	$47,620	$26,380	$13,515	$7,080
Women's singles	$454,500	$267,690	$138,000	$63,350	$31,650	$17,930	$12,848	$7,650	$4,000
Men's doubles*	$312,740	$169,880	$93,310	$51,470	$28,310	$13,510	—N/a	—N/a	—N/a
Women's doubles*	$133,840	$75,286	$40,432	$20,914	$11,850	$7,900	—N/a	—N/a	—N/a

_{*per team}

== Champions ==
=== Men's singles ===
- (Serbia) Novak Djokovic def (Spain) Carlos Alcaraz, 5–7, 7–6^{(9–7)}, 7–6^{(7–4)}

=== Women's singles ===
- (United States) Coco Gauff def. (Czech Republic) Karolína Muchová, 6–3, 6–4

=== Men's doubles ===
- (Argentina) Máximo González / (Argentina) Andrés Molteni def. (United Kingdom) Jamie Murray / (New Zealand) Michael Venus, 3–6, 6–1, [11–9]

=== Women's doubles ===
- (United States) Alycia Parks / (United States) Taylor Townsend def. (United States) Nicole Melichar-Martinez / (Australia) Ellen Perez 6–7^{(1–7)}, 6–4, [10–6]
