= 2023 WTA Lyon Open – Doubles =

Doubles
- 2023 WTA Lyon Open

Final
- Champions: (Spain) Cristina Bucșa (Netherlands) Bibiane Schoofs
- Runners-up: (Serbia) Olga Danilović; Alexandra Panova
- Score: 7–6^{(7–5)}, 6–3

Events
| Singles | Doubles |
- WTA Lyon Open

Cristina Bucșa and Bibiane Schoofs defeated Olga Danilović and Alexandra Panova in the final, 7–6^{(7–5)}, 6–3 to win the doubles tennis title at the 2023 WTA Lyon Open.

Laura Siegemund and Vera Zvonareva were the reigning champions, but chose not to participate this year.

== Seeds ==
1. (United States) Alycia Parks / (China) Zhang Shuai (quarterfinals)
2. (Ukraine) Nadiia Kichenok / (Japan) Makoto Ninomiya (semifinals)
3. (United Kingdom) Alicia Barnett / (Georgia (country)) Natela Dzalamidze (quarterfinals, withdrew)
4. (Switzerland) Viktorija Golubic / (Romania) Monica Niculescu (semifinals)

== Draw ==
Key

- Q = Qualifier
- WC = Wild card
- LL = Lucky loser
- Alt = Alternate
- ITF = ITF entry
- PR = Protected ranking
- SR = Special ranking
- SE = Special exempt
- JE = Junior exempt
- JR = Junior Accelerator Programme entrant
- CO = College Accelerator Programme entrant
- NG = Next Gen Accelerator Program entrant
- w/o = Walkover
- r = Retired
- d = Defaulted

=== Draw ===
First round
1 | (United States) A Parks (China) S Zhang | 4 | 6 | [10]
(Venezuela) A Gámiz (Spain) G García Pérez | 6 | 3 | [2]
(Spain) C Bucșa (Netherlands) B Schoofs | 5 | 6 | [10]
(United States) A Kulikov (Brazil) I Gamarra Martins | 7 | 4 | [6]
4 | (Switzerland) V Golubic (Romania) M Niculescu | w/o
A Blinkova (Norway) U Eikeri
(France) J Ponchet (Czech Republic) R Voráčová | 4 | 6^{4}
(United States) K Christian (United States) S Santamaria | 6 | 7^{7}
(Germany) V Heisen; L Marozava | 6 | 2 | [5]
(Serbia) O Danilović; A Panova | 2 | 6 | [10]
(Czech Republic) A Dețiuc (Czech Republic) J Malečková | 5 | 6^{6}
3 | (United Kingdom) A Barnett (Georgia (country)) N Dzalamidze | 7 | 7^{8}
WC | (United States) M Brengle (France) A Hesse | 2 | 5
(Romania) A Bogdan (Montenegro) D Kovinić | 6 | 7
WC | A Fomina-Klotz (France) E Jacquemot | 4 | 6 | [4]
2 | (Ukraine) N Kichenok (Japan) M Ninomiya | 6 | 3 | [10]

Quarterfinals
1 | (United States) A Parks (China) S Zhang | 2 | 7^{7} | [2]
(Spain) C Bucșa (Netherlands) B Schoofs | 6 | 6^{3} | [10]
4 | (Switzerland) V Golubic (Romania) M Niculescu | 5 | 6 | [10]
(United States) K Christian (United States) S Santamaria | 7 | 1 | [7]
(Serbia) O Danilović; A Panova | w/o
3 | (United Kingdom) A Barnett (Georgia (country)) N Dzalamidze
(Romania) A Bogdan (Montenegro) D Kovinić | 4 | 6 | [8]
2 | (Ukraine) N Kichenok (Japan) M Ninomiya | 6 | 4 | [10]

Semifinals
(Spain) C Bucșa (Netherlands) B Schoofs | 6 | 3 | [10]
4 | (Switzerland) V Golubic (Romania) M Niculescu | 4 | 6 | [8]
(Serbia) O Danilović; A Panova | 6 | 6
2 | (Ukraine) N Kichenok (Japan) M Ninomiya | 3 | 2

Final
(Spain) C Bucșa (Netherlands) B Schoofs | 7^{7} | 6
(Serbia) O Danilović; A Panova | 6^{5} | 3
