= 2023 WTA Lyon Open =

Women's tennis tournament in Lyon, France

- Date: 30 January – 5 February
- Edition: 4th
- Category: WTA 250
- Draw: 32S / 16D
- Prize money: $259,303
- Surface: Hard (Indoor)
- Location: Lyon, France
- Venue: Palais des Sports de Gerland

Champions

Singles
- (United States) Alycia Parks

Doubles
- (Spain) Cristina Bucșa / (Netherlands) Bibiane Schoofs
- WTA Lyon Open

The 2023 WTA Lyon Open (also known as the Open 6ème Sens — Métropole de Lyon for sponsorship reasons) was a women's tennis tournament played on indoor hard courts. It was the fourth edition of the Lyon Open (WTA) and an International tournament on the 2023 WTA Tour. It took place at the Palais des Sports de Gerland in Lyon, France, from January 30 to February 5, 2023.

== Champions ==
=== Singles ===
- (United States) Alycia Parks def. (France) Caroline Garcia, 7–6^{(9–7)}, 7–5

=== Doubles ===
- (Spain) Cristina Bucșa / (Netherlands) Bibiane Schoofs def. (Serbia) Olga Danilović / Alexandra Panova, 7–6^{(7–5)}, 6–3

== Singles main draw entrants ==
=== Seeds ===
Country	Player	Ranking^{1}	Seed
FRA	Caroline Garcia	4	1
CHN	Zhang Shuai	22	2
FRA	Alizé Cornet	34	3
CRO	Petra Martić	37	4
	Anastasia Potapova	44	5
EGY	Mayar Sherif	54	6
MNE	Danka Kovinić	55	7
	Anna Blinkova	60	8

- ^{1} Rankings as of 16 January 2023.

=== Other entrants ===
The following players received wildcards into the singles main draw:

- (France) Clara Burel
- (France) Kristina Mladenovic
- (Spain) Garbiñe Muguruza

The following players received entry from the qualifying draw:

- Erika Andreeva
- (Spain) Marina Bassols Ribera
- (Serbia) Olga Danilović
- (Croatia) Ana Konjuh
- (Spain) Rebeka Masarova
- (Czech Republic) Linda Nosková

=== Withdrawals ===
- (Romania) Sorana Cîrstea → replaced by (United States) Alycia Parks
- (Ukraine) Anhelina Kalinina → replaced by (Colombia) Camila Osorio
- Liudmila Samsonova → replaced by (Switzerland) Viktorija Golubic
- (Switzerland) Jil Teichmann → replaced by (Germany) Tamara Korpatsch
- (Italy) Martina Trevisan → replaced by (Belgium) Maryna Zanevska
- (Croatia) Donna Vekić → replaced by (Austria) Julia Grabher

=== Retirements ===
- Anna Blinkova (right forearm injury)

== Doubles main draw entrants ==
=== Seeds ===
Country	Player	Country	Player	Rank^{1}	Seed
USA	Alycia Parks	CHN	Zhang Shuai	93	1
UKR	Nadiia Kichenok	JPN	Makoto Ninomiya	123	2
GBR	Alicia Barnett	GEO	Natela Dzalamidze	127	3
SUI	Viktorija Golubic	ROU	Monica Niculescu	147	4

- Rankings as of January 16, 2023.

=== Other entrants ===
The following pairs received wildcards into the doubles main draw:

- (United States) Madison Brengle / (France) Amandine Hesse
- Alena Fomina-Klotz / (France) Elsa Jacquemot

=== Withdrawals ===
Before the tournament

- (Czech Republic) Anastasia Dețiuc / (Georgia (country)) Oksana Kalashnikova → replaced by (Czech Republic) Anastasia Dețiuc / (Czech Republic) Jesika Malečková
- (Czech Republic) Miriam Kolodziejová / (Slovakia) Viktória Kužmová → replaced by (France) Jessika Ponchet / (Czech Republic) Renata Voráčová

During the tournament

- (United Kingdom) Alicia Barnett / (Georgia (country)) Natela Dzalamidze (illness)
- Anna Blinkova / (Norway) Ulrikke Eikeri (right forearm injury)
