= 2023 Western & Southern Open – Men's singles =

Tennis championship

Men's singles
- 2023 Western & Southern Open

Final
- Champion: (Serbia) Novak Djokovic
- Runner-up: (Spain) Carlos Alcaraz
- Score: 5–7, 7–6^{(9–7)}, 7–6^{(7–4)}

Details
- Draw: 56
- Seeds: 16

Events
Singles	men	women
Doubles	men	women
- Cincinnati Masters

Novak Djokovic defeated Carlos Alcaraz in the final, 5–7, 7–6^{(9–7)}, 7–6^{(7–4)} to win the men's singles tennis title at the 2023 Cincinnati Masters. He saved a championship point en route to his third Cincinnati Masters title and record-extending 39th ATP Tour Masters 1000 title overall; it was his ninth career title won after saving match points during a tournament, and his second time of the year, after Adelaide. At 3 hours and 49 minutes, this match was the longest best-of-three-sets ATP Tour final and the longest match in the tournament's history. The final was named the ATP's Match of the Year.

Borna Ćorić was the defending champion, but lost in the second round to Hubert Hurkacz.

Alcaraz and Djokovic were in contention for the ATP No. 1 singles ranking. Alcaraz retained the top ranking by reaching the final. This was Djokovic's first tournament in the United States since the 2021 US Open, following the lifting of COVID-19 vaccination requirements for international air travelers in May 2023.

== Seeds ==
The top eight seeds received a bye into the second round.

1. (Spain) Carlos Alcaraz (final)
2. (Serbia) Novak Djokovic (champion)
3. Daniil Medvedev (third round)
4. (Greece) Stefanos Tsitsipas (third round)
5. (Norway) Casper Ruud (second round)
6. (Denmark) Holger Rune (second round, retired)
7. Andrey Rublev (second round)
8. (Italy) Jannik Sinner (second round)
9. (United States) Taylor Fritz (quarterfinals)
10. (United States) Frances Tiafoe (second round)
11. Karen Khachanov (withdrew)
12. (Canada) Félix Auger-Aliassime (second round)
13. (United Kingdom) Cameron Norrie (first round)
14. (United States) Tommy Paul (third round)
15. (Croatia) Borna Ćorić (second round)
16. (Germany) Alexander Zverev (semifinals)

Click on the seed number of a player to go to their draw section.

== Draw ==
Key

- Q = Qualifier
- WC = Wild card
- LL = Lucky loser
- Alt = Alternate
- ITF = ITF entry
- PR = Protected ranking
- SR = Special ranking
- SE = Special exempt
- JE = Junior exempt
- JR = Junior Accelerator Programme entrant
- CO = College Accelerator Programme entrant
- NG = Next Gen Accelerator Program entrant
- w/o = Walkover
- r = Retired
- d = Defaulted

=== Finals ===
Quarterfinals
1	(Spain) Carlos Alcaraz	4	6	6
Q	(Australia) Max Purcell	6	3	4
(Poland) Hubert Hurkacz	6	7^{10}
LL	(Australia) Alexei Popyrin	1	6^{8}
(France) Adrian Mannarino	2	3
16	(Germany) Alexander Zverev	6	6
9	(United States) Taylor Fritz	0	4
2	(Serbia) Novak Djokovic	6	6

Semifinals
1	(Spain) Carlos Alcaraz	2	7^{7}	6
(Poland) Hubert Hurkacz	6	6^{4}	3
16	(Germany) Alexander Zverev	6^{5}	5
2	(Serbia) Novak Djokovic	7^{7}	7

Final
1	(Spain) Carlos Alcaraz	7	6^{7}	6^{4}
2	(Serbia) Novak Djokovic	5	7^{9}	7^{7}

=== Top half ===
==== Section 1 ====
First round
WC	(United States) J Isner	6^{5}	6^{2}
Q	(Australia) J Thompson	7^{7}	7^{7}
(France) U Humbert	6	3	6
Q	(France) A Fils	4	6	2
(Serbia) M Kecmanović	5	6^{2}
14	(United States) T Paul	7	7^{7}
10	(United States) F Tiafoe	6	6^{7}	6
(Netherlands) T Griekspoor	4	7^{9}	4
WC	(United States) B Nakashima	3	7^{7}	3
WC	(Switzerland) S Wawrinka	6	6^{5}	6
PR	(South Africa) L Harris	4	4
Q	(Australia) M Purcell	6	6

Second round
1	(Spain) C Alcaraz	7	4	6
Q	(Australia) J Thompson	5	6	3
(France) U Humbert	1	6^{4}
14	(United States) T Paul	6	7^{7}
10	(United States) F Tiafoe	3	4
WC	(Switzerland) S Wawrinka	6	6
Q	(Australia) M Purcell	6	3	6
5	(Norway) C Ruud	4	6	4

Third round
1	(Spain) C Alcaraz	7^{8}	6^{0}	6
14	(United States) T Paul	6^{6}	7^{7}	3
WC	(Switzerland) S Wawrinka	4	2
Q	(Australia) M Purcell	6	6

Quarterfinals
1	(Spain) C Alcaraz	4	6	6
Q	(Australia) M Purcell	6	3	4

==== Section 2 ====
First round
(United States) B Shelton	5	6	6
(United States) C Eubanks	7	4	4
(Poland) H Hurkacz	7^{7}	3	7^{7}
Q	(Australia) T Kokkinakis	6^{2}	6	6^{1}
(United States) S Korda	6^{5}	4
15	(Croatia) B Ćorić	7^{7}	6
LL	(Australia) A Popyrin	6^{5}	6	6
LL	(Germany) D Altmaier	7^{7}	4	4
R Safiullin	6	3	3
(Chile) N Jarry	4	6	6
(Finland) E Ruusuvuori	6	6
Q	(France) C Moutet	4	2

Second round
4	(Greece) S Tsitsipas	7^{7}	7^{7}
(United States) B Shelton	6^{3}	6^{2}
(Poland) H Hurkacz	5	6	6
15	(Croatia) B Ćorić	7	3	3
LL	(Australia) A Popyrin	w/o
(Chile) N Jarry
(Finland) E Ruusuvuori	7^{12}	5	7^{7}
7	A Rublev	6^{10}	7	6^{3}

Third round
4	(Greece) S Tsitsipas	3	4
(Poland) H Hurkacz	6	6
LL	(Australia) A Popyrin	6	1	6
(Finland) E Ruusuvuori	2	6	3

Quarterfinals
(Poland) H Hurkacz	6	7^{10}
LL	(Australia) A Popyrin	1	6^{8}

=== Bottom half ===
==== Section 3 ====
First round
WC	(United States) M McDonald	7	6
(Germany) Y Hanfmann	5	1
(France) R Gasquet	4	3
(France) A Mannarino	6	6
(Italy) M Berrettini	6	2	3
12	(Canada) F Auger-Aliassime	4	6	6
16	(Germany) A Zverev	6	6
(Bulgaria) G Dimitrov	2	2
(France) G Barrère	4	5
(Japan) Y Nishioka	6	7
(United Kingdom) D Evans	4	3
(Italy) L Musetti	6	6

Second round
6	(Denmark) H Rune	4	0^{r}
WC	(United States) M McDonald	6	2
(France) A Mannarino	6	6
12	(Canada) F Auger-Aliassime	4	4
16	(Germany) A Zverev	7	6
(Japan) Y Nishioka	5	4
(Italy) L Musetti	3	2
3	D Medvedev	6	6

Third round
WC	(United States) M McDonald	4	0^{r}
(France) A Mannarino	6	3
16	(Germany) A Zverev	6	5	6
3	D Medvedev	4	7	4

Quarterfinals
(France) A Mannarino	2	3
16	(Germany) A Zverev	6	6

==== Section 4 ====
First round
(Argentina) F Cerúndolo	3	4
Q	(Serbia) D Lajović	6	6
(Italy) L Sonego	6	3	6
Q	A Shevchenko	3	6	3
(Czech Republic) J Lehečka	6^{14}	2
9	(United States) T Fritz	7^{16}	6
13	(United Kingdom) C Norrie	6	4	3
PR	(France) G Monfils	3	6	6
(Australia) A de Minaur	6	3	6
(United States) JJ Wolf	0	6	1
(Spain) A Davidovich Fokina	6	6
(Argentina) TM Etcheverry	3	3

Second round
8	(Italy) J Sinner	4	6^{4}
Q	(Serbia) D Lajović	6	7^{7}
(Italy) L Sonego	4	6^{1}
9	(United States) T Fritz	6	7^{7}
PR	(France) G Monfils	7	6
(Australia) A de Minaur	5	4
(Spain) A Davidovich Fokina	4	0^{r}
2	(Serbia) N Djokovic	6	0

Third round
Q	(Serbia) D Lajović	0^{r}
9	(United States) T Fritz	5
PR	(France) G Monfils	3	2
2	(Serbia) N Djokovic	6	6

Quarterfinals
9	(United States) T Fritz	0	4
2	(Serbia) N Djokovic	6	6

== Seeded players ==
The following are the seeded players. Seedings are based on ATP rankings as of 7 August 2023. Rank and points before are as of 14 August 2023.

Seed	Rank	Player	Points before	Points defending	Points won	Points after	Status
1	1	(Spain) Carlos Alcaraz	9,395	180	600	9,815	Runner-up, lost to (Serbia) Novak Djokovic [2]
2	2	(Serbia) Novak Djokovic	8,795	0	1,000	9,795	Champion, defeated (Spain) Carlos Alcaraz [1]
3	3	Daniil Medvedev	6,530	360	90	6,260	Third round lost to (Germany) Alexander Zverev [16]
4	4	(Greece) Stefanos Tsitsipas	5,090	600	90	4,580	Third round lost to (Poland) Hubert Hurkacz
5	7	(Norway) Casper Ruud	4,715	10	10	4,715	Second round lost to (Australia) Max Purcell [Q]
6	5	(Denmark) Holger Rune	4,790	10	10	4,790	Second round retired against (United States) Mackenzie McDonald [WC]
7	8	Andrey Rublev	4,595	90	10	4,515	Second round lost to (Finland) Emil Ruusuvuori
8	6	(Italy) Jannik Sinner	4,725	90	10	4,645	Second round lost to (Serbia) Dušan Lajović [Q]
9	9	(United States) Taylor Fritz	3,605	180	180	3,605	Quarterfinals lost to (Serbia) Novak Djokovic [2]
10	10	(United States) Frances Tiafoe	3,050	45	45	3,050	Second round lost to (Switzerland) Stan Wawrinka [WC]
11	11	Karen Khachanov	2,855	10	0	2,845	Withdrew
12	14	(Canada) Félix Auger-Aliassime	2,510	180	45	2,375	Second round lost to (France) Adrian Mannarino
13	15	(United Kingdom) Cameron Norrie	2,425	360	10	2,075	First round lost to (France) Gaël Monfils [PR]
14	13	(United States) Tommy Paul	2,525	45	90	2,570	Third round lost to (Spain) Carlos Alcaraz [1]
15	16	(Croatia) Borna Ćorić	2,315	1,000	45	1,360	Second round lost to (Poland) Hubert Hurkacz
16	17	(Germany) Alexander Zverev	2,310	0	360	2,670	Semifinals lost to (Serbia) Novak Djokovic [2]

== Other entry information ==
=== Wild cards ===
- (United States) John Isner
- (United States) Mackenzie McDonald
- (United States) Brandon Nakashima
- (Switzerland) Stan Wawrinka

=== Protected ranking ===
- (South Africa) Lloyd Harris
- (France) Gaël Monfils

=== Withdrawals ===
- (Spain) Roberto Bautista Agut → replaced by Roman Safiullin
- (Kazakhstan) Alexander Bublik → replaced by (United States) J. J. Wolf
- (Spain) Pablo Carreño Busta → replaced by (Italy) Lorenzo Sonego
- (Croatia) Marin Čilić → replaced by (Serbia) Miomir Kecmanović
- Karen Khachanov → replaced by (Australia) Alexei Popyrin
- (Australia) Nick Kyrgios → replaced by (Finland) Emil Ruusuvuori
- (United Kingdom) Andy Murray → replaced by (Germany) Daniel Altmaier
- (Canada) Milos Raonic → replaced by (France) Richard Gasquet
- (Canada) Denis Shapovalov → replaced by (Germany) Yannick Hanfmann
- (Germany) Jan-Lennard Struff → replaced by (South Africa) Lloyd Harris

== Qualifying ==
=== Seeds ===
1. (Serbia) Laslo Djere (first round)
2. (France) Arthur Fils (qualified)
3. (Germany) Daniel Altmaier (qualifying competition, lucky loser)
4. (Australia) Jordan Thompson (qualified)
5. (Australia) Alexei Popyrin (qualifying competition, lucky loser)
6. (Hungary) Márton Fucsovics (first round)
7. (Australia) Aleksandar Vukic (withdrew)
8. (China) Zhang Zhizhen (qualifying competition)
9. (Italy) Matteo Arnaldi (first round)
10. (Serbia) Dušan Lajović (qualified)
11. (Colombia) Daniel Elahi Galán (qualifying competition)
12. (France) Luca Van Assche (first round)
13. (United States) Marcos Giron (first round)
14. Aslan Karatsev (first round)

=== Qualifiers ===
1. (Australia) Thanasi Kokkinakis
2. (France) Arthur Fils
3. (France) Corentin Moutet
4. (Australia) Jordan Thompson
5. (Australia) Max Purcell
6. Alexander Shevchenko
7. (Serbia) Dušan Lajović

=== Lucky losers ===
1. (Germany) Daniel Altmaier
2. (Australia) Alexei Popyrin

=== Draw ===
==== First qualifier ====
First round
1	(Serbia) Laslo Djere	3	6	5
(Australia) Thanasi Kokkinakis	6	3	7
(Portugal) Nuno Borges	6^{5}	6	5
11	(Colombia) Daniel Elahi Galán	7^{7}	4	7

Qualifying competition
(Australia) Thanasi Kokkinakis	5	7^{9}	6
11	(Colombia) Daniel Elahi Galán	7	6^{7}	2

==== Second qualifier ====
First round
2	(France) Arthur Fils	6	6
WC	(United States) Brandon Holt	1	1
WC	(United States) Maxime Cressy	7^{7}	3	6^{11}
8	(China) Zhang Zhizhen	6^{4}	6	7^{13}

Qualifying competition
2	(France) Arthur Fils	6	6
8	(China) Zhang Zhizhen	3	3

==== Third qualifier ====
First round
3	(Germany) Daniel Altmaier	3	7^{7}	6
(Australia) Christopher O'Connell	6	6^{5}	4
(France) Corentin Moutet	4	6	6
9	(Italy) Matteo Arnaldi	6	0	2

Qualifying competition
3	(Germany) Daniel Altmaier	4	4
(France) Corentin Moutet	6	6

==== Fourth qualifier ====
First round
4	(Australia) Jordan Thompson	6	6^{2}	6
(France) Alexandre Müller	4	7^{7}	4
(Switzerland) Marc-Andrea Hüsler	6	6
14	Aslan Karatsev	4	4

Qualifying competition
4	(Australia) Jordan Thompson	6	6
(Switzerland) Marc-Andrea Hüsler	3	4

==== Fifth qualifier ====
First round
5	(Australia) Alexei Popyrin	6	4	6
Ilya Ivashka	2	6	4
(Australia) Max Purcell	4	6	6
12	(France) Luca Van Assche	6	3	3

Qualifying competition
5	(Australia) Alexei Popyrin	7^{8}	5	4
(Australia) Max Purcell	6^{6}	7	6

==== Sixth qualifier ====
First round
6	(Hungary) Márton Fucsovics	5	4
Alt	Alexander Shevchenko	7	6
WC	(Argentina) Diego Schwartzman	6	6
13	(United States) Marcos Giron	4	4

Qualifying competition
Alt	Alexander Shevchenko	6	3	6
WC	(Argentina) Diego Schwartzman	1	6	3

==== Seventh qualifier ====
First round
Alt	(France) Hugo Gaston	3	2
(Australia) Jason Kubler	6	6
WC	(Australia) Rinky Hijikata	3	3
10	(Serbia) Dušan Lajović	6	6

Qualifying competition
(Australia) Jason Kubler	4	4
10	(Serbia) Dušan Lajović	6	6

== Championship match statistics ==
=== Alcaraz vs Djokovic ===
Category	Alcaraz	Djokovic
Aces	11	2
Double faults	5	5
1st serve % in	85–48	73–55
Winning % on 1st Serve	61–24	49–24
Winning % on 2nd Serve	23–25	35–20
Net points won	30–14	37–13
Break points won	4–6	3–13
Receiving points won	44–84	49–84
Winners	42	28
Unforced errors	22	20
Winners-UFE	+20	+8
Net points won	14–6	22–11
Total points won	128	133
Total games won	19	19

Source: https://www.tennis24.com/match/KASG3jz8/#/match-summary/match-statistics/0
