= Bibiane Schoofs =

Dutch tennis player (born 1988)

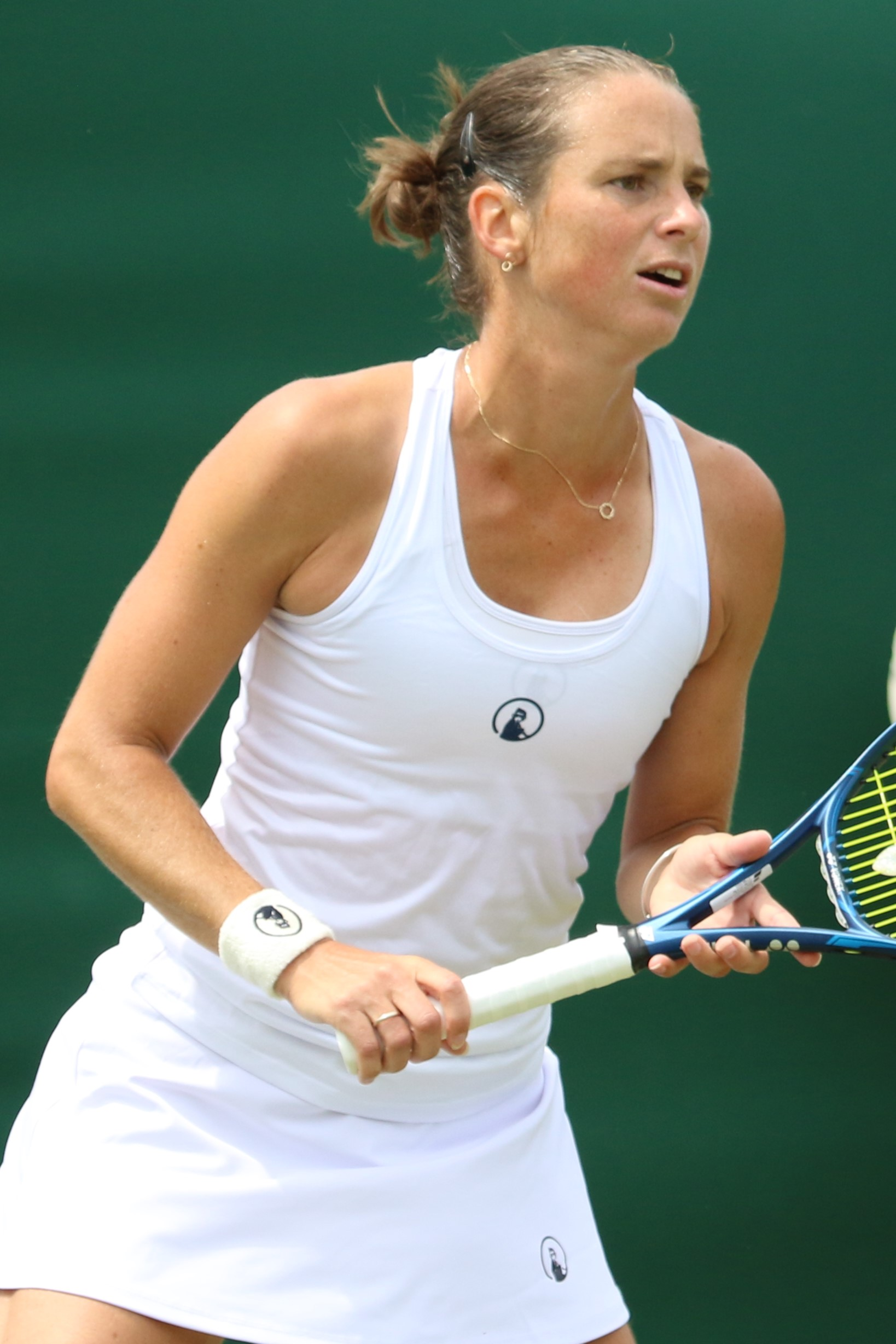
- Schoofs at the 2023 Wimbledon Championships
- Country (sports): Netherlands
- Residence: Ede, Netherlands
- Born: 13 May 1988 (age 38) Rhenen, Netherlands
- Height: 1.70 m (5 ft 7 in)
- Retired: 2025
- Plays: Right (two-handed backhand)
- Prize money: $701,963

Singles
- Career record: 389–265
- Career titles: 8 ITF
- Highest ranking: No. 142 (11 June 2012)

Grand Slam singles results
- Australian Open: Q3 (2018)
- French Open: Q2 (2018)
- Wimbledon: Q3 (2012)
- US Open: Q2 (2019)

Doubles
- Career record: 245–156
- Career titles: 3 WTA, 2 WTA Challenger
- Highest ranking: No. 77 (6 November 2023)

Grand Slam doubles results
- Australian Open: 1R (2024)
- French Open: 1R (2020)
- Wimbledon: 1R (2018, 2024, 2025)
- US Open: 1R (2025)

Team competitions
- Fed Cup: 6–10

Bibiane Schoofs (born 13 May 1988), previously known as Bibiane Weijers, is a Dutch former professional tennis player.

On 11 June 2012, she reached a career-high WTA singles ranking of 142, whilst her best doubles ranking was world No. 77 on 6 November 2023. She married on 7 July 2014, and took her husband's surname, however, in late 2016, reverted to her maiden name, Schoofs. In December 2016, she became national singles champion under that name.

In her career, she won eight singles tournaments on the ITF Women's Circuit, three of them in 2011. In doubles, she won 23 ITF titles, three of them in 2017. At age 29, she won the doubles title at the 2017 Mumbai Open, a tournament on the Challenger-level. In January 2018, she won her first doubles title on WTA Tour, at the Auckland Open, her second in Lyon in 2023, and the third 2024 on grass, at her home tournament Rosmalen Open.

Playing for the Netherlands in the BJK Cup, Schoofs has a win–loss record of 6–10.

== Career ==
=== 2011 ===
Her best season so far has been in 2011 when she climbed more than 250 places in the rankings and won two $25k tournaments, in Montpellier and Middelburg. She also reached the finals in Prague and Zwevegem.

At the end of the season, Schoofs qualified for the Luxembourg Open, thus making her debut in a WTA Tour event. She played Angelique Kerber in the first round and recorded the biggest win of her career, defeating the world No. 29 in three sets after being down 6–2, 2–0. She then caused another upset against world No. 62, Canadian Rebecca Marino, defeating her in the second round in three sets. Her run was ended by British qualifier Anne Keothavong in the quarterfinals where she was beaten 6–3, 6–2.

=== 2012 ===
Schoofs began her year as a qualifier at the Auckland Open, but lost to Monica Puig, leading 6–2, 5–4 and 6–2, 6–7, 3–0.

She then qualified for the Australian Open. In a 2.5 hour match, she outlasted Kazakh Yaroslava Shvedova 11–9 in the final set. In the second round she lost to Russian teenager Irina Khromacheva.

In Fed Cup competitions, Schoofs played four matches, winning two. She then was out for two months after a thigh injury.

She started playing again at a $25k event in Civitavecchia, Italy. She won against Anna Floris, but lost to eventual winner María Teresa Torró Flor in two sets. In the following week, she reached the semifinals at $25k event in Tunis defeating Çağla Büyükakçay, Pemra Özgen and Ana Savić, all in straight sets. She was beaten in three sets by Sandra Zaniewska. She played at the $50k Saint-Gaudens tournament and beat Melanie Oudin and Edina Gallovits-Hall in the first two rounds, before losing to former world No. 15, Aravane Rezaï, in the quarterfinals.

Schoofs tried to qualify for the main draw of the French Open. However, she was beaten in three close sets by Akgul Amanmuradova from Uzbekistan, in the first round. Schoofs also tried to qualify for the main draw of the WTA tournament in Birmingham, played on grass. She was beaten in the first round by Melanie Oudin, 6–4, 7–6. This was her first match on grass in seven years. She again played qualifying at the Wimbledon Championships where she beat Dia Evtimova, 6–2, 6–2, and Zheng Saisai, 6–3, 6–3, to reach the final qualifying round of a Grand Slam tournament for the first time in her career. She held three setpoints in the first set against Mirjana Lučić before succumbing 5–7, 4–6.

Schoofs suffered a shock loss at the $25k tournament in Ystad where she was the top seed. The transition from grass to clay was too difficult to handle for her; she lost to Austrian Nicole Rottmann in three sets. Schoofs played a $50k clay-court tournament in Versmold, Germany the week after that. She beat French qualifier Anaïs Laurendon in the first round. She defeated Leticia Costas in the second round, and Kristina Mladenovic in the quarterfinals (all in straight sets), and faced former world No. 36, Anastasija Sevastova, in the semifinals.

=== 2018: Maiden doubles title and top 100 debut ===
Schoofs won the doubles title of the Auckland Open together with her partner, five-time Grand Slam champion Sara Errani. With this victory, Schoofs entered the top 100 of the WTA rankings in women's doubles.

At the Australian Open qualifying, Schoofs defeated world No. 119, Naomi Broady, in the second round, but lost in the final round against Ivana Jorović, with a score of 3–6, 3–6.

=== 2020–2025: Major debut in doubles, two WTA Tour doubles titles, retirement ===
In 2020, Schoofs made her main-draw debut at the French Open, partnering compatriot Lesley Pattinama Kerkhove.

At the Lyon Open, she won her second tour-level doubles title with Cristina Bucșa, three years after she reached the final at the same tournament with partner Kerkhove. As a result, she reached a doubles ranking of No. 164 on 6 February 2023.

Alongside Greet Minnen, she also won the doubles title at the WTA 125 in Saint-Malo, defeating Eri Hozumi and Makoto Ninomiya in the final.

In June 2024, she won her third tour-level doubles title at the Rosmalen Open, partnering with Ingrid Neel.

Schoofs announced her retirement from tennis in October 2025, with her final appearance being at the 2025 US Open.

== Grand Slam singles performance timeline ==
Key
W	F	SF	QF	#R	RR	Q#	P#	DNQ	A	Z#	PO	G	S	B	NMS	NTI	P	NH

(W) winner; (F) finalist; (SF) semifinalist; (QF) quarterfinalist; (#R) rounds 4, 3, 2, 1; (RR) round-robin stage; (Q#) qualification round; (P#) preliminary round; (DNQ) did not qualify; (A) absent; (Z#) Davis/Fed Cup Zonal Group (with number indication) or (PO) play-off; (G) gold, (S) silver or (B) bronze Olympic/Paralympic medal; (NMS) not a Masters tournament; (NTI) not a Tier I tournament; (P) postponed; (NH) not held; (SR) strike rate (events won / competed); (W–L) win–loss record.
To avoid confusion and double counting, these charts are updated at the conclusion of a tournament or when the player's participation has ended.

Tournament	2012	2013	2014	...	2018	2019	2020	2021	2022	W–L
Australian Open	Q2	A	A		Q3	Q2	Q1	Q1	A	0–0
French Open	Q1	A	A		Q2	Q1	Q1	A	A	0–0
Wimbledon	Q3	A	A		Q1	Q1	NH	A	A	0–0
US Open	Q1	A	Q1		Q1	Q2	A	Q1	A	0–0
Win–loss	0–0	0–0	0–0		0–0	0–0	0–0	0–0	0–0	0–0

== WTA Tour finals ==
=== Doubles: 6 (3 titles, 3 runner-ups) ===
Legend
WTA 500
WTA 250 (Note: The WTA International tournaments were reclassified as WTA 250 tournaments in 2021.) (3–3)

Result	W–L	Date	Tournament	Tier	Surface	Partner	Opponents	Score
Win	1–0	Jan 2018	Auckland Open, New Zealand	International	Hard	(Italy) Sara Errani	(Japan) Eri Hozumi (Japan) Miyu Kato	7–5, 6–1
Loss	1–1	Jun 2019	Rosmalen Open, Netherlands	International	Grass	(Netherlands) Lesley Kerkhove	(Japan) Shuko Aoyama (Serbia) Aleksandra Krunić	5–7, 3–6
Loss	1–2	Mar 2020	Lyon Open, France	International	Hard (i)	(Netherlands) Lesley Kerkhove	(Romania) Laura Ioana Paar (Germany) Julia Wachaczyk	5–7, 4–6
Win	2–2	Feb 2023	Lyon Open, France	WTA 250	Hard (i)	(Spain) Cristina Bucșa	(Serbia) Olga Danilović; Alexandra Panova	7–6^{(7–5)}, 6–3
Loss	2–3	Mar 2024	ATX Open, United States	WTA 250	Hard	(Poland) Katarzyna Kawa	(Australia) Olivia Gadecki (United Kingdom) Olivia Nicholls	2–6, 4–6
Win	3–3	Jun 2024	Rosmalen Open, Netherlands	WTA 250	Grass	(Estonia) Ingrid Neel	(Slovenia) Tereza Mihalíková (United Kingdom) Olivia Nicholls	7–6^{(8–6)}, 6–3

== WTA 125 finals ==
=== Doubles: 3 (2 titles, 1 runner-up) ===
Result	W–L	Date	Tournament	Surface	Partner	Opponents	Score
Win	1–0	Nov 2017	Mumbai Open, India	Hard	(Mexico) Victoria Rodríguez	(Slovenia) Dalila Jakupović (Russia) Irina Khromacheva	7–5, 3–6, [10–7]
Loss	1–1	Nov 2018	Mumbai Open, India	Hard	(Czech Republic) Barbora Štefková	(Russia) Natela Dzalamidze (Russia) Veronika Kudermetova	4–6, 6–7^{(4–7)}
Win	2–1	May 2023	Open de Saint-Malo, France	Clay	(Belgium) Greet Minnen	(Norway) Ulrikke Eikeri (Japan) Eri Hozumi	7–6^{(9–7)}, 7–6^{(7–3)}

== ITF Circuit finals ==
=== Singles: 19 (8 titles, 11 runner-ups) ===
Legend $60,000 tournaments (0–1) $25,000 tournaments (3–6) $10/15,000 tournaments (5–4)	Finals by surface Hard (1–4) Clay (6–6) Carpet (1–1)

Result	W–L	Date	Tournament	Tier	Surface	Opponent	Score
Loss	0–1	Mar 2008	ITF Cairo, Egypt	10,000	Clay	(Poland) Katarzyna Piter	1–6, 3–6
Loss	0–2	May 2008	ITF Edinburgh, United Kingdom	10,000	Clay	(Netherlands) Marcella Koek	1–6, 6–4, 3–6
Win	1–2	Aug 2010	ITF Enschede, Netherlands	10,000	Clay	(Germany) Nicola Geuer	6–1, 6–2
Win	2–2	Mar 2011	ITF Antalya, Turkey	10,000	Clay	(Netherlands) Daniëlle Harmsen	6–0, 4–6, 6–3
Win	3–2	Jun 2011	Open de Montpellier, France	25,000	Clay	(Spain) Leticia Costas	6–4, 6–4
Win	4–2	Jul 2011	ITF Middelburg, Netherlands	25,000	Clay	(Netherlands) Lesley Kerkhove	7–6^{(7–4)}, 6–1
Loss	4–3	Jul 2011	ITF Zwevegem, Belgium	25,000	Clay	(Romania) Mihaela Buzărnescu	6–3, 2–6, 4–6
Loss	4–4	Aug 2011	ITF Prague, Czech Republic	25,000	Clay	(Slovakia) Jana Čepelová	6–7^{(6–8)}, 4–6
Loss	4–5	Aug 2012	ITF Koksijde, Belgium	25,000	Clay	(Germany) Annika Beck	1–6, 1–6
Loss	4–6	Mar 2014	ITF Antalya, Turkey	10,000	Hard	(Czech Republic) Denisa Allertová	4–6, 3–6
Win	5–6	Apr 2014	ITF Antalya, Turkey	10,000	Hard	(Czech Republic) Sandra Honigová	6–0, 6–3
Win	6–6	Jul 2015	ITF Amstelveen, Netherlands	10,000	Clay	(Denmark) Karen Barbat	6–4, 3–6, 6–1
Win	7–6	Jul 2016	ITF Amstelveen, Netherlands	10,000	Clay	(Netherlands) Arianne Hartono	6–7^{(4–7)}, 6–4, 6–3
Loss	7–7	Feb 2017	GB Pro-Series Glasgow, UK	15,000	Hard (i)	(Czech Republic) Petra Krejsová	6–2, 5–7, 4–6
Win	8–7	Feb 2017	AK Ladies Open, Germany	25,000	Carpet (i)	(Netherlands) Quirine Lemoine	7–5, 7–5
Loss	8–8	Aug 2017	ITF Koksijde, Belgium	25,000	Clay	(Australia) Isabelle Wallace	4–6, 6–4, 6–3
Loss	8–9	Oct 2017	ITF Clermont-Ferrand, France	25,000	Hard (i)	(Belarus) Vera Lapko	4–6, 4–6
Loss	8–10	Oct 2017	Challenger de Saguenay, Canada	60,000	Hard (i)	(Hungary) Gréta Arn	1–6, 2–6
Loss	8–11	Mar 2020	AK Ladies Open, Germany	W25	Carpet (i)	(Germany) Eva Lys	2–6, 4–6

=== Doubles: 42 (23 titles, 19 runner-ups) ===
Legend $100,000 tournaments (1–0) $80,000 tournaments (1–1) $60/75,000 tournaments (1–3) $25,000 tournaments (13–6) $10/15,000 tournaments (7–9)	Finals by surface Hard (12–7) Clay (11–12)

Result	W–L	Date	Tournament	Tier	Surface	Partner	Opponents	Score
Loss	0–1	Mar 2005	ITF Las Palmas, Spain	10k	Hard	(Spain) Laura Vallverdu-Zaira	(Czech Republic) Petra Cetkovská (Spain) Katia Sabate	7–6^{(5)}, 3–6, 1–6
Loss	0–2	May 2005	ITF Edinburgh, United Kingdom	10k	Clay	(Netherlands) Leonie Mekel	(United Kingdom) Rebecca Llewellyn (United Kingdom) Melanie South	0–6, 6–3, 3–6
Win	1–2	Oct 2005	ITF Tucumán, Argentina	10k	Clay	(Argentina) Agustina Lepore	(Argentina) Lucía Jara Lozano (Argentina) Denise Kirbijikian	6–1, 7–5
Win	2–2	May 2006	ITF Bournemouth, UK	10k	Clay	(Netherlands) Marrit Boonstra	(Russia) Maya Gaverova (Russia) Anastasia Poltoratskaya	6–4, 1–6, 6–4
Win	3–2	Sep 2007	Open de Limoges, France	10k	Hard (i)	(Italy) Stella Menna	(France) Adeline Goncalves (France) Gracia Radovanovic	6–4, 6–1
Loss	3–3	Nov 2007	ITF Le Havre, France	10k	Clay (i)	(Russia) Anna Savitskaya	(France) Elodie Caillat (France) Samantha Schoeffel	2–6, 6–2, [6–10]
Win	4–3	Dec 2007	ITF Havana, Cuba	10k	Hard	(Poland) Monika Krauze	(Cuba) Yamile Fors Guerra (Cuba) Yanet Núñez Mojarena	6–4, 6–4
Loss	4–4	Mar 2008	ITF Cairo, Egypt	10k	Clay	(Russia) Anna Savitskaya	(Russia) Galina Fokina (Georgia (country)) Oksana Kalashnikova	6–7^{(4)}, 4–6
Win	5–4	Aug 2008	Reinert Open Versmold, Germany	10k	Clay	(France) Samantha Schoeffel	(Germany) Nicola Geuer (Germany) Laura Haberkorn	4–6, 7–6^{(5)}, [10–5]
Loss	5–5	Sep 2008	ITF Clermont-Ferrand, France	10k	Hard (i)	(France) Samantha Schoeffel	(Russia) Ksenia Lykina (Italy) Vivienne Vierin	3–6, 2–6
Loss	5–6	Oct 2008	ITF Barcelona, Spain	10k	Clay	(France) Samantha Schoeffel	(United States) Kristi Miller (Spain) Lucía Sainz	7–6^{(5)}, 6–7^{(6)}, [7–10]
Win	6–6	Nov 2008	ITF Le Havre, France	10k	Clay (i)	(France) Samantha Schoeffel	(Croatia) Ana Bezjak (Serbia) Neda Kozić	6–3, 6–1
Loss	6–7	Mar 2009	ITF Giza, Egypt	10k	Clay	(Netherlands) Marlot Meddens	(Morocco) Fatima El Allami (Georgia (country)) Oksana Kalashnikova	4–6, 2–6
Loss	6–8	Mar 2009	ITF Giza, Egypt	10k	Clay	(Poland) Sandra Zaniewska	(Russia) Galina Fokina (Ukraine) Alyona Sotnikova	6–4, 3–6, [10–8]
Loss	6–9	Jun 2009	ITF Apeldoorn, Netherlands	10k	Clay	(Serbia) Neda Kozić	(Netherlands) Richèl Hogenkamp (Netherlands) Nicolette van Uitert	3–6, 7–6^{(9)}, [8–10]
Win	7–9	Sep 2010	ITF Alphen a/d Rijn, Netherlands	25k	Clay	(Netherlands) Daniëlle Harmsen	(Russia) Ksenia Lykina (France) Irena Pavlovic	6–3, 6–2
Win	8–9	Mar 2011	ITF Antalya, Turkey	10k	Clay	(Netherlands) Daniëlle Harmsen	(Russia) Eugeniya Pashkova (Russia) Maria Zharkova	6–3, 7–5
Win	9–9	Sep 2012	ITF Clermont-Ferrand, France	25k	Hard (i)	(Latvia) Diāna Marcinkēviča	(United Kingdom) Samantha Murray (United Kingdom) Jade Windley	6–3, 6–0
Loss	9–10	Feb 2017	ITF Moscow, Russia	25k	Hard (i)	(Russia) Ekaterina Yashina	(Belarus) Vera Lapko (Ukraine) Dayana Yastremska	5–7, 3–6
Loss	9–11	Apr 2017	ITF Pula, Italy	25k	Clay	(Poland) Sandra Zaniewska	(Italy) Alice Matteucci (Italy) Camilla Rosatello	1–6, 3–6
Win	10–11	Jul 2017	ITF Middelburg, Netherlands	25k	Clay	(Greece) Valentini Grammatikopoulou	(Australia) Naiktha Bains (United States) Dasha Ivanova	6–7^{(8)}, 7–5, [10–5]
Win	11–11	Jul 2017	ITF Horb, Germany	25k	Clay	(Netherlands) Lesley Kerkhove	(Hungary) Ágnes Bukta (Bulgaria) Isabella Shinikova	7–5, 6–3
Loss	11–12	Aug 2017	ITF El Espinar, Spain	25k	Hard	(Turkey) Ayla Aksu	(United States) Quinn Gleason (Brazil) Luisa Stefani	3–6, 2–6
Win	12–12	Aug 2017	ITF Koksijde, Belgium	25k	Clay	(India) Ankita Raina	(Belgium) Marie Benoît (Belgium) Magali Kempen	3–6, 6–3, [11–9]
Win	13–12	Jan 2018	Open Andrézieux-Bouthéon, France	60k	Hard (i)	(Belgium) Ysaline Bonaventure	(Italy) Camilla Rosatello (Belgium) Kimberley Zimmermann	4–6, 7–5, [10–7]
Win	14–12	Feb 2018	GB Pro-Series Loughborough, UK	25k	Hard (i)	(Netherlands) Michaëlla Krajicek	(United Kingdom) Tara Moore (Switzerland) Conny Perrin	6–7^{(5)}, 6–1, [10–6]
Win	15–12	Apr 2018	ITF Pula, Italy	25k	Clay	(Slovakia) Chantal Škamlová	(United States) Chiara Scholl (Bosnia and Herzegovina) Jelena Simić	6–2, 3–6, [10–7]
Loss	15–13	Jul 2018	Prague Open, Czech Republic	80k	Clay	(Belgium) Kimberley Zimmermann	(Sweden) Cornelia Lister (Serbia) Nina Stojanović	2–6, 6–2, [8–10]
Win	16–13	Oct 2018	Open de Touraine, France	25k	Hard (i)	(Poland) Magdalena Fręch	(Czech Republic) Miriam Kolodziejová (Czech Republic) Jesika Malečková	5–7, 6–2, [10–3]
Win	17–13	Mar 2019	ITF Mâcon, France	W25	Hard (i)	(Netherlands) Lesley Kerkhove	(Italy) Claudia Giovine (Italy) Angelica Moratelli	6–2, 6–4
Loss	17–14	Jul 2019	Reinert Open Versmold, Germany	W60	Clay	(India) Ankita Raina	(Russia) Amina Anshba (Czech Republic) Anastasia Dețiuc	6–0, 3–6, [8–10]
Loss	17–15	Oct 2019	Challenger de Saguenay, Canada	W60	Hard (i)	(United Kingdom) Samantha Murray	(Canada) Mélodie Collard (Canada) Leylah Fernandez	6–7^{(3)}, 2–6
Win	18–15	Feb 2020	ITF Nonthaburi, Thailand	W25	Hard	(India) Ankita Raina	(Thailand) Supapitch Kuearum (Thailand) Mananchaya Sawangkaew	6–4, 6–2
Win	19–15	Feb 2020	ITF Nonthaburi, Thailand	W25	Hard	(India) Ankita Raina	(Japan) Miyabi Inoue (China) Kang Jiaqi	6–2, 3–6, [10–7]
Win	20–15	Feb 2021	ITF Potchefstroom, South Africa	W25	Hard	(Netherlands) Lesley Pattinama Kerkhove	(United Kingdom) Naomi Broady (United Kingdom) Eden Silva	4–6, 6–3, [10–6]
Loss	20–16	Oct 2021	ITF Lima, Peru	W25	Clay	(Mexico) Victoria Rodríguez	(Brazil) Carolina Alves (Venezuela) Andrea Gámiz	3–6, 6–7^{(2)}
Win	21–16	Oct 2021	ITF Istanbul, Turkey	W25	Hard (i)	(Netherlands) Jasmijn Gimbrère	(Poland) Maja Chwalińska (Czech Republic) Miriam Kolodziejová	6–2, 6–4
Loss	21–17	Nov 2022	ITF Pétange, Luxembourg	W25	Hard (i)	(Netherlands) Rosalie van der Hoek	(Belgium) Magali Kempen (Switzerland) Xenia Knoll	0–6, 4–6
Loss	21–18	Jan 2023	GB Pro-Series Loughborough, UK	W25	Hard (i)	(Lithuania) Justina Mikulskytė	(Slovakia) Viktória Morvayová (Czech Republic) Anna Sisková	3–6, 7–6^{(3)}, [6–10]
Win	22–18	Sep 2023	Tokyo Open, Japan	W100	Hard	(France) Jessika Ponchet	(United Kingdom) Alicia Barnett (United Kingdom) Olivia Nicholls	4–6, 6–1, [10–7]
Win	23–18	Oct 2023	Internationaux de Poitiers, France	W80	Hard (i)	(France) Jessika Ponchet	(Russia) Ekaterina Maklakova (Russia) Elena Pridankina	7–5, 6–4
Loss	23–19	Apr 2025	Chiasso Open, Switzerland	W75	Clay	(Algeria) Inès Ibbou	(United Kingdom) Alicia Barnett (France) Elixane Lechemia	2–6, 3–6
