= 2023 Western & Southern Open – Women's singles =

Women's singles
- 2023 Western & Southern Open

Final
- Champion: (United States) Coco Gauff
- Runner-up: (Czech Republic) Karolína Muchová
- Score: 6–3, 6–4

Details
- Draw: 56
- Seeds: 16

Events
Singles	men	women
Doubles	men	women
← 2022 ·	Cincinnati Open	· 2024 →

Coco Gauff defeated Karolína Muchová in the final, 6–3, 6–4 to win the women's singles tennis title at the 2023 Cincinnati Open. It was her first WTA 1000 title and the first WTA 1000 final appearances for both Gauff and Muchová. Gauff became the youngest champion in Cincinnati history. By reaching the final, Muchová debuted in the top ten of the WTA rankings.

Caroline Garcia was the defending champion, but lost in the second round to Sloane Stephens.

== Seeds ==
The top eight seeds received a bye into the second round.

1. (Poland) Iga Świątek (semifinals)
2. Aryna Sabalenka (semifinals)
3. (United States) Jessica Pegula (third round)
4. (Kazakhstan) Elena Rybakina (third round, retired)
5. (Tunisia) Ons Jabeur (quarterfinals)
6. (France) Caroline Garcia (second round)
7. (United States) Coco Gauff (champion)
8. (Greece) Maria Sakkari (third round)
9. (Czech Republic) Petra Kvitová (second round)
10. (Czech Republic) Markéta Vondroušová (quarterfinals)
11. (Czech Republic) Barbora Krejčíková (first round)
12. (Brazil) Beatriz Haddad Maia (first round)
13. (Switzerland) Belinda Bencic (first round)
14. Daria Kasatkina (third round)
15. (United States) Madison Keys (first round)
16. Veronika Kudermetova (first round)

Click on the seed number of a player to go to their draw section.

== Draw ==
=== Key ===
- Q = Qualifier
- WC = Wild card
- LL = Lucky loser
- Alt = Alternate
- SE = Special exempt
- PR = Protected ranking
- ITF = ITF entry
- JE = Junior exempt
- w/o = Walkover
- r = Retired
- d = Defaulted
- SR = Special ranking

=== Finals ===
Quarterfinals
1	(Poland) Iga Świątek	7^{7}	6
10	(Czech Republic) Markéta Vondroušová	6^{3}	1
Q	(Italy) Jasmine Paolini	3	2
7	(United States) Coco Gauff	6	6
(Czech Republic) Karolína Muchová	3
(Czech Republic) Marie Bouzková	0^{r}
5	(Tunisia) Ons Jabeur	5	3
2	Aryna Sabalenka	7	6

Semifinals
1	(Poland) Iga Świątek	6^{2}	6	4
7	(United States) Coco Gauff	7^{7}	3	6
(Czech Republic) Karolína Muchová	6^{4}	6	6
2	Aryna Sabalenka	7^{7}	3	2

Final
7	(United States) Coco Gauff	6	6
(Czech Republic) Karolína Muchová	3	4

=== Top half ===
==== Section 1 ====
First round
WC	(United States) D Collins	6	6
PR	A Pavlyuchenkova	3	1
(China) Q Zheng	6	6
Q	A Sasnovich	1	4
WC	(United States) V Williams	6	7
16	V Kudermetova	4	5
10	(Czech Republic) M Vondroušová	7	6
(Czech Republic) K Siniaková	5	4
WC	(Switzerland) C Naef	6	4	5
A Potapova	1	6	7
(United States) S Stephens	7	6
(Italy) E Cocciaretto	5	2

Second round
1	(Poland) I Świątek	6	6
WC	(United States) D Collins	1	0
(China) Q Zheng	1	6	6
WC	(United States) V Williams	6	2	1
10	(Czech Republic) M Vondroušová	6	6
A Potapova	4	2
(United States) S Stephens	4	6	6
6	(France) C Garcia	6	4	4

Third round
1	(Poland) I Świątek	3	6	6
(China) Q Zheng	6	1	1
10	(Czech Republic) M Vondroušová	7	6
(United States) S Stephens	5	3

Quarterfinals
1	(Poland) I Świątek	7^{7}	6
10	(Czech Republic) M Vondroušová	6^{3}	1

==== Section 2 ====
First round
(Latvia) J Ostapenko	1	6	6
(Czech Republic) Ka Plíšková	6	3	4
Q	(Italy) J Paolini	6	6
(Ukraine) M Kostyuk	2	1
Q	(Spain) C Bucșa	4	6	6
13	(Switzerland) B Bencic	6	3	2
9	(Czech Republic) P Kvitová	7^{7}	6
A Blinkova	6^{2}	0
Q	(Czech Republic) L Nosková	2	6	6
L Samsonova	6	3	1
Q	(China) Xiy Wang	6^{3}	6	6^{5}
(Egypt) M Sherif	7^{7}	4	7^{7}

Second round
4	(Kazakhstan) E Rybakina	6^{6}	6	6
(Latvia) J Ostapenko	7^{8}	2	4
Q	(Italy) J Paolini	6	6
Q	(Spain) C Bucșa	1	3
9	(Czech Republic) P Kvitová	6	2	4
Q	(Czech Republic) L Nosková	3	6	6
(Egypt) M Sherif	2	2
7	(United States) C Gauff	6	6

Third round
4	(Kazakhstan) E Rybakina	6	2^{r}
Q	(Italy) J Paolini	4	5
Q	(Czech Republic) L Nosková	4	0
7	(United States) C Gauff	6	6

Quarterfinals
Q	(Italy) J Paolini	3	2
7	(United States) C Gauff	6	6

=== Bottom half ===
==== Section 3 ====
First round
E Alexandrova	0	2
(Romania) S Cîrstea	6	6
(Croatia) P Martić	6	3	6
Q	(United States) E Navarro	2	6	3
(Czech Republic) K Muchová	6^{3}	6	6
12	(Brazil) B Haddad Maia	7^{7}	1	4
15	(United States) M Keys	3	6	3
(Belgium) E Mertens	6	3	6
(Romania) I-C Begu	2	2
(Czech Republic) M Bouzková	6	6
(United States) B Pera	6	1	2
Q	(Italy) M Trevisan	3	6	6

Second round
8	(Greece) M Sakkari	2	6	7
(Romania) S Cîrstea	6	3	5
(Croatia) P Martić	3	6	3
(Czech Republic) K Muchová	6	3	6
(Belgium) E Mertens	2	6	1
(Czech Republic) M Bouzková	6	4	6
Q	(Italy) M Trevisan	7^{7}	2	3
3	(United States) J Pegula	6^{2}	6	6

Third round
8	(Greece) M Sakkari	3	6	3
(Czech Republic) K Muchová	6	2	6
(Czech Republic) M Bouzková	6	6
3	(United States) J Pegula	4	0

Quarterfinals
(Czech Republic) K Muchová	3
(Czech Republic) M Bouzková	0^{r}

==== Section 4 ====
First round
(China) L Zhu	3	5
(Ukraine) A Kalinina	6	7
PR	(United States) J Brady	6^{5}	5
(Croatia) D Vekić	7^{7}	7
V Azarenka	6	7
11	(Czech Republic) B Krejčíková	3	5
14	D Kasatkina	6	6
WC	(United States) P Stearns	2	1
LL	(France) V Gracheva	6	6
WC	(Denmark) C Wozniacki	4	4
(Poland) M Linette	6	6^{5}	2
Q	(United States) A Li	0	7^{7}	6

Second round
5	(Tunisia) O Jabeur	6	6^{2}	7^{7}
(Ukraine) A Kalinina	3	7^{7}	6^{2}
(Croatia) D Vekić	3	6	6
V Azarenka	6	3	4
14	D Kasatkina	6	6
LL	(France) V Gracheva	3	1
Q	(United States) A Li	5	6	4
2	A Sabalenka	7	2	6

Third round
5	(Tunisia) O Jabeur	5
(Croatia) D Vekić	2^{r}
14	D Kasatkina	3	3
2	A Sabalenka	6	6

Quarterfinals
5	(Tunisia) O Jabeur	5	3
2	A Sabalenka	7	6

== Seeded players ==
The following are the seeded players. Seedings are based on WTA rankings as of 7 August 2023. Rank and points before are as of 14 August 2023.

The event is not mandatory on the women's side and points from the 2022 tournament are included in the table below only if they counted towards the player's ranking as of 14 August 2023. For other players, the points defending column shows the player's 16th best result.

Points defending will be replaced at the end of the tournament by the highest of (a) the player's points from the 2023 tournament, (b) her 17th best result, or (c) points from her second-highest non-mandatory WTA 1000 event.

Seed	Rank	Player	Points before	Points defending	Points won	Points after	Status
1	1	(Poland) Iga Świątek	9,730	(125)^{†}	350	9,955	Semifinals lost to (United States) Coco Gauff [7]
2	2	Aryna Sabalenka	8,746	350	350	8,746	Semifinals lost to (Czech Republic) Karolína Muchová
3	3	(United States) Jessica Pegula	6,030	190	105	5,945	Third round lost to (Czech Republic) Marie Bouzková
4	4	(Kazakhstan) Elena Rybakina	5,755	190	105	5,670	Third round retired against (Italy) Jasmine Paolini [Q]
5	5	(Tunisia) Ons Jabeur	4,746	105	190	4,831	Quarterfinals lost to Aryna Sabalenka [2]
6	6	(France) Caroline Garcia	4,685	930	(65)^{‡}	3,825	Second round lost to (United States) Sloane Stephens
7	7	(United States) Coco Gauff	3,760	(65)^{†}	900	4,595	Champion, defeated (Czech Republic) Karolína Muchová
8	8	(Greece) Maria Sakkari	3,510	(30)^{†}	105	3,585	Third round lost to (Czech Republic) Karolína Muchová
9	9	(Czech Republic) Petra Kvitová	3,445	585	60	2,920	Second round lost to (Czech Republic) Linda Nosková [Q]
10	10	(Czech Republic) Markéta Vondroušová	3,211	(1)^{†}	190	3,400	Quarterfinals lost to (Poland) Iga Świątek [1]
11	11	(Czech Republic) Barbora Krejčíková	2,840	(30)^{†}	1	2,840^{§}	First round lost to Victoria Azarenka
12	19	(Brazil) Beatriz Haddad Maia	2,220	(60)^{†}	1	2,220^{§}	First round lost to (Czech Republic) Karolína Muchová
13	14	(Switzerland) Belinda Bencic	2,605	(60)^{†}	1	2,605^{§}	First round lost to (Spain) Cristina Bucșa [Q]
14	13	Daria Kasatkina	2,735	(60)^{†}	105	2,780	Third round lost to Aryna Sabalenka [2]
15	15	(United States) Madison Keys	2,580	350	(60)^{†}	2,290	First round lost to (Belgium) Elise Mertens
16	16	Veronika Kudermetova	2,485	105	(100)^{†}	2,480	First round lost to (United States) Venus Williams [WC]

† Points from the player's 16th best result (for points defending) or 17th best result (for points earned), in each case as of 14 August 2023.
‡ Points from the player's second-best non-mandatory WTA 1000 event, which are required to be counted in her ranking.
§ No change in points because points from this tournament did not count as one of the player's 16 best results.

== Other entry information ==
=== Wild cards ===
- (United States) Danielle Collins
- (Switzerland) Céline Naef
- (United States) Peyton Stearns
- (United States) Venus Williams
- (Denmark) Caroline Wozniacki

=== Protected ranking ===
- (United States) Jennifer Brady
- Anastasia Pavlyuchenkova

=== Withdrawals ===
- (Spain) Paula Badosa → replaced by (China) Zhu Lin
- (Czech Republic) Barbora Strýcová → replaced by (United States) Sloane Stephens
- (Ukraine) Elina Svitolina → replaced by (France) Varvara Gracheva

== Qualifying ==
=== Seeds ===
1. (Italy) Elisabetta Cocciaretto (moved to main draw)
2. (France) Varvara Gracheva (qualifying competition, lucky loser)
3. (Ukraine) Lesia Tsurenko (first round)
4. (United States) Alycia Parks (qualifying competition)
5. (Italy) Jasmine Paolini (qualified)
6. (United States) Lauren Davis (first round)
7. (Italy) Camila Giorgi (first round, retired)
8. (Czech Republic) Linda Nosková (qualified)
9. (United States) Emma Navarro (qualified)
10. (Czech Republic) Linda Fruhvirtová (first round)
11. (Romania) Ana Bogdan (first round)
12. (France) Alizé Cornet (qualifying competition)
13. (Kazakhstan) Yulia Putintseva (qualifying competition)
14. (Italy) Martina Trevisan (qualified)
15. (Colombia) Camila Osorio (qualifying competition)
16. (Italy) Lucia Bronzetti (first round)

=== Qualifiers ===
1. (China) Wang Xiyu
2. (Spain) Cristina Bucșa
3. (Italy) Martina Trevisan
4. Aliaksandra Sasnovich
5. (Italy) Jasmine Paolini
6. (United States) Ann Li
7. (United States) Emma Navarro
8. (Czech Republic) Linda Nosková

=== Lucky loser ===
1. (France) Varvara Gracheva

=== Draw ===
==== First qualifier ====
First round				Qualifying competition
					(China) Wang Xiyu	6	6
				13	(Kazakhstan) Yulia Putintseva	1	3
PR	(Spain) Sara Sorribes Tormo	6^{4}	5	13	(Kazakhstan) Yulia Putintseva	1	3
13	(Kazakhstan) Yulia Putintseva	7^{7}	7

==== Second qualifier ====
First round
2	(France) Varvara Gracheva	4	6	6
(Kazakhstan) Anna Danilina	6	3	2
(Spain) Cristina Bucșa	6	6
10	(Czech Republic) Linda Fruhvirtová	0	4

Qualifying competition
2	(France) Varvara Gracheva	3	2
(Spain) Cristina Bucșa	6	6

==== Third qualifier ====
First round
3	(Ukraine) Lesia Tsurenko	1	6	3
(United States) Taylor Townsend	6	4	6
PR	(Chinese Taipei) Hsieh Su-wei	1	0
14	(Italy) Martina Trevisan	6	6

Qualifying competition
(United States) Taylor Townsend	4	6	5
14	(Italy) Martina Trevisan	6	4	7

==== Fourth qualifier ====
First round
4	(United States) Alycia Parks	6	6
PR	Vera Zvonareva	3	1
Aliaksandra Sasnovich	6	2	6
11	(Romania) Ana Bogdan	3	6	1

Qualifying competition
4	(United States) Alycia Parks	1	7^{7}	6^{0}
Aliaksandra Sasnovich	6	6^{5}	7^{7}

==== Fifth qualifier ====
First round
5	(Italy) Jasmine Paolini	1	6	7
(Spain) Rebeka Masarova	6	3	5
(United Kingdom) Katie Boulter	6	6^{5}	0^{r}
15	(Colombia) Camila Osorio	4	7^{7}	1

Qualifying competition
5	(Italy) Jasmine Paolini	7	7
15	(Colombia) Camila Osorio	5	5

==== Sixth qualifier ====
First round
6	(United States) Lauren Davis	6	2	1
(United States) Ann Li	4	6	6
(Germany) Laura Siegemund	6	6^{6}	2^{r}
12	(France) Alizé Cornet	3	7^{8}	5

Qualifying competition
(United States) Ann Li	6	6
12	(France) Alizé Cornet	3	3

==== Seventh qualifier ====
First round
7	(Italy) Camila Giorgi	6	4	0^{r}
(Canada) Rebecca Marino	4	6	3
(Canada) Leylah Fernandez	4	6	4
9	(United States) Emma Navarro	6	2	6

Qualifying competition
(Canada) Rebecca Marino	6	0	1
9	(United States) Emma Navarro	4	6	6

==== Eighth qualifier ====
First round
8	(Czech Republic) Linda Nosková	4	6	6
(Poland) Magdalena Fręch	6	3	4
(France) Diane Parry	6	6
16	(Italy) Lucia Bronzetti	2	2

Qualifying competition
8	(Czech Republic) Linda Nosková	6	6
(France) Diane Parry	3	1
