= 2023 Western & Southern Open – Men's doubles =

Men's doubles
- 2023 Western & Southern Open

Final
- Champions: (Argentina) Máximo González (Argentina) Andrés Molteni
- Runners-up: (United Kingdom) Jamie Murray (New Zealand) Michael Venus
- Score: 3–6, 6–1, [11–9]

Details
- Draw: 28 (3 WC )
- Seeds: 8

Events
Singles	men	women
Doubles	men	women
- Western & Southern Open

Máximo González and Andrés Molteni defeated Jamie Murray and Michael Venus in the final, 3–6, 6–1, [11–9] to win the men's doubles title at the 2023 Cincinnati Masters. They saved a championship point en route to their first ATP Tour Masters 1000 title.

Rajeev Ram and Joe Salisbury were the defending champions, but lost in the second round to González and Molteni.

== Seeds ==
The top four seeds received a bye into the second round.

1. (Netherlands) Wesley Koolhof / (United Kingdom) Neal Skupski (second round)
2. (Croatia) Ivan Dodig / (United States) Austin Krajicek (semifinals)
3. (United States) Rajeev Ram / (United Kingdom) Joe Salisbury (second round)
4. (India) Rohan Bopanna / (Australia) Matthew Ebden (second round)
5. (Monaco) Hugo Nys / (Poland) Jan Zieliński (first round)
6. (Mexico) Santiago González / (France) Édouard Roger-Vasselin (semifinals)
7. (Germany) Kevin Krawietz / (Germany) Tim Pütz (second round)
8. (Spain) Marcel Granollers / (Argentina) Horacio Zeballos (first round)

== Draw ==
Key

- Q = Qualifier
- WC = Wild card
- LL = Lucky loser
- Alt = Alternate
- ITF = ITF entry
- PR = Protected ranking
- SR = Special ranking
- SE = Special exempt
- JE = Junior exempt
- JR = Junior Accelerator Programme entrant
- CO = College Accelerator Programme entrant
- NG = Next Gen Accelerator Program entrant
- w/o = Walkover
- r = Retired
- d = Defaulted

=== Finals ===
Semifinals
(United Kingdom) Jamie Murray (New Zealand) Michael Venus	6	6
6	(Mexico) Santiago González (France) Édouard Roger-Vasselin	3	4
(Argentina) Máximo González (Argentina) Andrés Molteni	7^{8}	1	[15]
2	(Croatia) Ivan Dodig (United States) Austin Krajicek	6^{6}	6	[13]

Final
(United Kingdom) Jamie Murray (New Zealand) Michael Venus	6	1	[9]
(Argentina) Máximo González (Argentina) Andrés Molteni	3	6	[11]

=== Top half ===
First round
(Serbia) N Ćaćić (Serbia) N Djokovic	4	2
(United Kingdom) J Murray (New Zealand) M Venus	6	6
(El Salvador) M Arévalo (Netherlands) J-J Rojer	6	3	[11]
(Spain) A Davidovich Fokina (Greece) S Tsitsipas	4	6	[9]
WC	(Italy) L Musetti (Italy) L Sonego	3	7	[10]
8	(Spain) M Granollers (Argentina) H Zeballos	6	5	[3]
WC	(United States) C Eubanks (United States) B Shelton	7	6
(Belgium) S Gillé (Belgium) J Vliegen	5	4
(United Kingdom) L Glasspool (Finland) H Heliövaara	6^{10}	5
(Australia) M Purcell; A Rublev	7^{12}	7
(Argentina) F Cerúndolo (Argentina) TM Etcheverry	3	3
6	(Mexico) S González (France) É Roger-Vasselin	6	6

Second round
1	(Netherlands) W Koolhof (United Kingdom) N Skupski	6^{3}	7^{7}	[1]
(United Kingdom) J Murray (New Zealand) M Venus	7^{7}	6^{3}	[10]
(El Salvador) M Arévalo (Netherlands) J-J Rojer	4	6^{5}
WC	(Italy) L Musetti (Italy) L Sonego	6	7^{7}
4	(India) R Bopanna (Australia) M Ebden	6^{4}	6	[7]
WC	(United States) C Eubanks (United States) B Shelton	7^{7}	2	[10]
(Australia) M Purcell; A Rublev	6	3	[7]
6	(Mexico) S González (France) É Roger-Vasselin	4	6	[10]

Quarterfinals
(United Kingdom) J Murray (New Zealand) M Venus	7^{7}	7^{9}
WC	(Italy) L Musetti (Italy) L Sonego	6^{5}	6^{7}
WC	(United States) C Eubanks (United States) B Shelton	5	7^{7}	[9]
6	(Mexico) S González (France) É Roger-Vasselin	7	6^{5}	[11]

Semifinals
(United Kingdom) J Murray (New Zealand) M Venus	6	6
6	(Mexico) S González (France) É Roger-Vasselin	3	4

=== Bottom half ===
First round
7	(Germany) K Krawietz (Germany) T Pütz	6	6
(Canada) F Auger-Aliassime (France) A Mannarino	1	4
(United States) N Lammons (United States) J Withrow	6	6^{6}	[3]
(Croatia) N Mektić (Australia) J Peers	3	7^{8}	[10]
WC	(United States) M McDonald (United States) F Tiafoe	4	1^{r}
(Argentina) M González (Argentina) A Molteni	6	4
5	(Monaco) H Nys (Poland) J Zieliński	6	1	[8]
(Brazil) M Melo (Germany) A Zverev	3	6	[10]
(Australia) R Hijikata (Australia) J Kubler	7	4	[4]
(Poland) H Hurkacz (Croatia) M Pavić	5	6	[10]
(Netherlands) R Haase; K Khachanov	6	1	[10]
(United Kingdom) D Evans (Germany) A Mies	4	6	[7]

Second round
7	(Germany) K Krawietz (Germany) T Pütz	5	6	[11]
(Croatia) N Mektić (Australia) J Peers	7	2	[13]
(Argentina) M González (Argentina) A Molteni	7^{7}	5	[10]
3	(United States) R Ram (United Kingdom) J Salisbury	6^{4}	7	[7]
(Brazil) M Melo (Germany) A Zverev	6	7
(Poland) H Hurkacz (Croatia) M Pavić	3	5
(Netherlands) R Haase; K Khachanov	1	4
2	(Croatia) I Dodig (United States) A Krajicek	6	6

Quarterfinals
(Croatia) N Mektić (Australia) J Peers	4	4
(Argentina) M González (Argentina) A Molteni	6	6
(Brazil) M Melo (Germany) A Zverev	6^{4}	3
2	(Croatia) I Dodig (United States) A Krajicek	7^{7}	6

Semifinals
(Argentina) M González (Argentina) A Molteni	7^{8}	1	[15]
2	(Croatia) I Dodig (United States) A Krajicek	6^{6}	6	[13]

== Seeded teams ==
The following are the seeded teams. Seedings are based on ATP rankings as of 7 August 2023.

Country	Player	Country	Player	Rank^{1}	Seed
NED	Wesley Koolhof	GBR	Neal Skupski	2	1
CRO	Ivan Dodig	USA	Austin Krajicek	7	2
USA	Rajeev Ram	GBR	Joe Salisbury	11	3
IND	Rohan Bopanna	AUS	Matthew Ebden	20	4
MON	Hugo Nys	POL	Jan Zieliński	21	5
MEX	Santiago González	FRA	Édouard Roger-Vasselin	23	6
GER	Kevin Krawietz	GER	Tim Pütz	27	7
ESP	Marcel Granollers	ARG	Horacio Zeballos	27	8

== Other entry information ==
=== Wild cards ===
- (United States) Christopher Eubanks / (United States) Ben Shelton
- (United States) Mackenzie McDonald / (United States) Frances Tiafoe
- (Italy) Lorenzo Musetti / (Italy) Lorenzo Sonego

=== Withdrawals ===
- (Kazakhstan) Alexander Bublik / (France) Adrian Mannarino → replaced by (Canada) Félix Auger-Aliassime / (France) Adrian Mannarino
- (France) Fabrice Martin / (Germany) Andreas Mies → replaced by (United Kingdom) Dan Evans / (Germany) Andreas Mies
