= 2023 WTA Lyon Open – Singles =

Singles
- 2023 WTA Lyon Open

Final
- Champion: (United States) Alycia Parks
- Runner-up: (France) Caroline Garcia
- Score: 7–6^{(9–7)}, 7–5

Details
- Draw: 32 (4Q, 3WC)
- Seeds: 8

Events
Singles	Doubles
- WTA Lyon Open

Alycia Parks defeated Caroline Garcia in the final, 7–6^{(9–7)}, 7–5 to win the singles tennis title at the 2023 WTA Lyon Open. It was her first WTA Tour singles title.

Zhang Shuai was the defending champion, but lost in the second round to Maryna Zanevska. Her first round win was her last singles win until she defeated McCartney Kessler at the 2024 China Open's first round. The 24-match losing streak was the longest losing streak for any player, male or female, in the Open Era.

This tournament marked the final professional appearance of former world No. 1 and two-time Grand Slam champion Garbiñe Muguruza. She lost to Linda Nosková in the first round. Muguruza later announced her retirement in April 2024.

== Seeds ==
1. (France) Caroline Garcia (final)
2. (China) Zhang Shuai (second round)
3. (France) Alizé Cornet (first round)
4. (Croatia) Petra Martić (second round)
5. Anastasia Potapova (quarterfinals)
6. (Egypt) Mayar Sherif (second round)
7. (Montenegro) Danka Kovinić (quarterfinals)
8. Anna Blinkova (first round, retired)

== Draw ==
Key

- Q = Qualifier
- WC = Wild card
- LL = Lucky loser
- Alt = Alternate
- ITF = ITF entry
- PR = Protected ranking
- SR = Special ranking
- SE = Special exempt
- JE = Junior exempt
- JR = Junior Accelerator Programme entrant
- CO = College Accelerator Programme entrant
- NG = Next Gen Accelerator Program entrant
- w/o = Walkover
- r = Retired
- d = Defaulted

=== Finals ===
Semifinals
1	(France) Caroline Garcia	6	6
(Colombia) Camila Osorio	2	2
(United States) Alycia Parks	6	7^{7}
(Belgium) Maryna Zanevska	3	6^{4}

Final
1	(France) Caroline Garcia	6^{7}	5
(United States) Alycia Parks	7^{9}	7

=== Top half ===
First round
1	(France) C Garcia	6	7^{7}
(Czech Republic) T Martincová	4	6^{4}
(Belgium) A Van Uytvanck	6	6
(Germany) T Korpatsch	2	4
Q	(Spain) R Masarova	3	2
(Italy) J Paolini	6	6
Q	E Andreeva	6^{3}	6	4
8	A Blinkova	7^{7}	4	0^{r}
3	(France) A Cornet	4	6	1
(Colombia) C Osorio	6	4	6
Q	(Serbia) O Danilović	5	6	3
(Germany) J Niemeier	7	2	6
Q	(Czech Republic) L Nosková	6	6
WC	(Spain) G Muguruza	1	4
Q	(Croatia) A Konjuh	2	2^{r}
6	(Egypt) M Sherif	6	3

Second round
1	(France) C Garcia	2	6	6
(Belgium) A Van Uytvanck	6	0	1
(Italy) J Paolini	6	6
Q	E Andreeva	2	3
(Colombia) C Osorio	7^{7}	7
(Germany) J Niemeier	6^{5}	5
Q	(Czech Republic) L Nosková	6	6
6	(Egypt) M Sherif	3	2

Quarterfinals
1	(France) C Garcia	7	7
(Italy) J Paolini	5	5
(Colombia) C Osorio	6	7^{7}
Q	(Czech Republic) L Nosková	4	6^{3}

Semifinals
1	(France) C Garcia	6	6
(Colombia) C Osorio	2	2

=== Bottom half ===
First round
7	(Montenegro) D Kovinić	6	6
(Switzerland) V Golubic	1	4
(Spain) N Párrizas Díaz	4	4
(Hungary) A Bondár	6	6
(United States) A Parks	6	5	6
(Austria) J Grabher	3	7	4
WC	(France) K Mladenovic	6	3	5
4	(Croatia) P Martić	3	6	7
5	A Potapova	4	6	6
Q	(Spain) M Bassols Ribera	6	1	2
(Romania) A Bogdan	5	4
WC	(France) C Burel	7	6
(Hungary) D Gálfi	1	6^{3}
(Belgium) M Zanevska	6	7^{7}
(United States) M Brengle	3	2
2	(China) S Zhang	6	6

Second round
7	(Montenegro) D Kovinić	4	6	6
(Hungary) A Bondár	6	2	3
(United States) A Parks	2	7^{7}	6
4	(Croatia) P Martić	6	6^{3}	2
5	A Potapova	6	4	6
WC	(France) C Burel	4	6	3
(Belgium) M Zanevska	6	6
2	(China) S Zhang	2	0

Quarterfinals
7	(Montenegro) D Kovinić	5	2
(United States) A Parks	7	6
5	A Potapova	6	1	2
(Belgium) M Zanevska	3	6	6

Semifinals
(United States) A Parks	6	7^{7}
(Belgium) M Zanevska	3	6^{4}

== Qualifying ==
=== Seeds ===
1. (Czech Republic) Linda Nosková (qualified)
2. (Italy) Camila Giorgi (first round)
3. (Bulgaria) Viktoriya Tomova (first round)
4. (Spain) Rebeka Masarova (qualified)
5. (Ukraine) Kateryna Baindl (first round)
6. Varvara Gracheva (first round)
7. (Spain) Cristina Bucșa (first round)
8. (Poland) Magdalena Fręch (first round)
9. (Italy) Sara Errani (qualifying competition)
10. (Slovenia) Kaja Juvan (qualifying competition)
11. (France) Diane Parry (qualifying competition)
12. (Denmark) Clara Tauson (first round)

=== Qualifiers ===
1. (Czech Republic) Linda Nosková
2. (Serbia) Olga Danilović
3. Erika Andreeva
4. (Spain) Rebeka Masarova
5. (Croatia) Ana Konjuh
6. (Spain) Marina Bassols Ribera

=== Qualifying draw ===
==== First qualifier ====
First round
1	(Czech Republic) Linda Nosková	6	6
WC	(France) Margaux Rouvroy	3	2
(Slovakia) Viktória Kužmová	6	2	6
7	(Spain) Cristina Bucșa	0	6	4

Qualifying competition
1	(Czech Republic) Linda Nosková	6	6
(Slovakia) Viktória Kužmová	1	3

==== Second qualifier ====
First round
2	(Italy) Camila Giorgi	1	3
(United Kingdom) Katie Swan	6	6
PR	(Serbia) Olga Danilović	6	6
12	(Denmark) Clara Tauson	4	4

Qualifying competition
(United Kingdom) Katie Swan	2	6	0
PR	(Serbia) Olga Danilović	6	3	6

==== Third qualifier ====
First round
3	(Bulgaria) Viktoriya Tomova	6	3	4
Erika Andreeva	2	6	6
WC	(France) Jessika Ponchet	4	4
11	(France) Diane Parry	6	6

Qualifying competition
Erika Andreeva	6	6
11	(France) Diane Parry	4	3

==== Fourth qualifier ====
First round
4	(Spain) Rebeka Masarova	6	6
WC	(France) Amandine Hesse	2	2
(Germany) Anna-Lena Friedsam	6	4	2
10	(Slovenia) Kaja Juvan	4	6	6

Qualifying competition
4	(Spain) Rebeka Masarova	6	6^{8}	6
10	(Slovenia) Kaja Juvan	4	7^{10}	3

==== Fifth qualifier ====
First round
5	(Ukraine) Kateryna Baindl	2	7^{7}	6^{1}
(Croatia) Ana Konjuh	6	6^{2}	7^{7}
(Switzerland) Simona Waltert	7^{7}	7^{7}
8	(Poland) Magdalena Fręch	6^{3}	6^{0}

Qualifying competition
(Croatia) Ana Konjuh	6	3	6
(Switzerland) Simona Waltert	3	6	2

==== Sixth qualifier ====
First round
6	Varvara Gracheva	3	1
(Spain) Marina Bassols Ribera	6	6
WC	(France) Alice Tubello	4	4
9	(Italy) Sara Errani	6	6

Qualifying competition
(Spain) Marina Bassols Ribera	6	6
9	(Italy) Sara Errani	2	4
