= 2023 Western & Southern Open – Women's doubles =

Women's doubles
- 2023 Western & Southern Open

Final
- Champions: (United States) Alycia Parks (United States) Taylor Townsend
- Runners-up: (United States) Nicole Melichar-Martinez (Australia) Ellen Perez
- Score: 6–7^{(1–7)}, 6–4, [10–6]

Events
Singles	men	women
Doubles	men	women
← 2022 ·	Western & Southern Open	· 2024 →

Alycia Parks and Taylor Townsend defeated Nicole Melichar-Martinez and Ellen Perez in the final, 6–7^{(1–7)}, 6–4, [10–6] to win the women's doubles title at the 2023 Cincinnati Masters.

Lyudmyla Kichenok and Jeļena Ostapenko were the defending champions, but lost in the second round to Parks and Townsend.

== Seeds ==
The top four seeds received a bye into the second round.

1. (Czech Republic) Barbora Krejčíková / (Czech Republic) Kateřina Siniaková (quarterfinals)
2. (Australia) Storm Hunter / (Belgium) Elise Mertens (semifinals)
3. (United States) Nicole Melichar-Martinez / (Australia) Ellen Perez (final)
4. (United States) Desirae Krawczyk / (Netherlands) Demi Schuurs (quarterfinals)
5. (Ukraine) Lyudmyla Kichenok / (Latvia) Jeļena Ostapenko (second round)
6. (Chinese Taipei) Hsieh Su-wei / (China) Wang Xinyu (second round)
7. (Chinese Taipei) Chan Hao-ching / (Mexico) Giuliana Olmos (semifinals)
8. (Japan) Shuko Aoyama / (Japan) Ena Shibahara (first round)

== Draw ==
=== Key ===
- Q = Qualifier
- WC = Wild card
- LL = Lucky loser
- Alt = Alternate
- SE = Special exempt
- PR = Protected ranking
- ITF = ITF entry
- JE = Junior exempt
- w/o = Walkover
- r = Retired
- d = Defaulted
- SR = Special ranking

=== Finals ===
Semifinals
7	(Chinese Taipei) Chan Hao-ching (Mexico) Giuliana Olmos	6	4	[5]
3	(United States) Nicole Melichar-Martinez (Australia) Ellen Perez	2	6	[10]
(United States) Alycia Parks (United States) Taylor Townsend	6	6
2	(Australia) Storm Hunter (Belgium) Elise Mertens	4	2

Final
3	(United States) Nicole Melichar-Martinez (Australia) Ellen Perez	7^{7}	4	[6]
(United States) Alycia Parks (United States) Taylor Townsend	6^{1}	6	[10]

=== Top half ===
First round
(France) C Garcia (Ukraine) M Kostyuk	4	6	[8]
(Czech Republic) Ka Plíšková (Croatia) D Vekić	6	2	[10]
(Tunisia) O Jabeur (Croatia) P Martić	3	4
WC	(United States) J Brady (United States) A Muhammad	6	6
(Poland) M Linette (United States) B Pera	2	4
7	(Chinese Taipei) H-c Chan (Mexico) G Olmos	6	6
(Slovakia) T Mihalíková (China) Y Xu	3	6	[10]
(Kazakhstan) A Danilina (Georgia (country)) O Kalashnikova	6	4	[7]
(Japan) M Kato (Indonesia) A Sutjiadi	7	6^{5}	[10]
(Germany) L Siegemund; V Zvonareva	5	7^{7}	[8]
(Canada) G Dabrowski (New Zealand) E Routliffe	6	6
8	(Japan) S Aoyama (Japan) E Shibahara	4	4

Second round
1	(Czech Republic) B Krejčíková (Czech Republic) K Siniaková	w/o
(Czech Republic) Ka Plíšková (Croatia) D Vekić
WC	(United States) J Brady (United States) A Muhammad	5	2
7	(Chinese Taipei) H-c Chan (Mexico) G Olmos	7	6
3	(United States) N Melichar-Martinez (Australia) E Perez	6	6
(Slovakia) T Mihalíková (China) Y Xu	3	4
(Japan) M Kato (Indonesia) A Sutjiadi	7^{7}	4	[10]
(Canada) G Dabrowski (New Zealand) E Routliffe	6^{4}	6	[1]

Quarterfinals
1	(Czech Republic) B Krejčíková (Czech Republic) K Siniaková	3	4
7	(Chinese Taipei) H-c Chan (Mexico) G Olmos	6	6
3	(United States) N Melichar-Martinez (Australia) E Perez	7	4	[10]
(Japan) M Kato (Indonesia) A Sutjiadi	5	6	[8]

Semifinals
7	(Chinese Taipei) H-c Chan (Mexico) G Olmos	6	4	[5]
3	(United States) N Melichar-Martinez (Australia) E Perez	2	6	[10]

=== Bottom half ===
First round
5	(Ukraine) L Kichenok (Latvia) J Ostapenko	7	7
Alt	(Norway) U Eikeri (China) L Zhu	5	5
(United States) A Parks (United States) T Townsend	6	6
(Chinese Taipei) L Chan (China) Z Yang	3	3
V Azarenka (Brazil) B Haddad Maia	5	3
WC	(United States) E Navarro (United States) P Stearns	7	6
6	(Chinese Taipei) S-w Hsieh (China) Xin Wang	6	6
A Blinkova (France) V Gracheva	0	1
Alt	E Alexandrova; A Sasnovich	2	0
PR	A Pavlyuchenkova (Brazil) L Stefani	6	6
(Italy) E Cocciaretto (Egypt) M Sherif	6^{5}	3
(Romania) I-C Begu (Spain) S Sorribes Tormo	7^{7}	6

Second round
5	(Ukraine) L Kichenok (Latvia) J Ostapenko	6^{4}	1
(United States) A Parks (United States) T Townsend	7^{7}	6
WC	(United States) E Navarro (United States) P Stearns	7^{7}	3	[4]
4	(United States) D Krawczyk (Netherlands) D Schuurs	6^{4}	6	[10]
6	(Chinese Taipei) S-w Hsieh (China) Xin Wang	3	4
PR	A Pavlyuchenkova (Brazil) L Stefani	6	6
(Romania) I-C Begu (Spain) S Sorribes Tormo	4	1
2	(Australia) S Hunter (Belgium) E Mertens	6	6

Quarterfinals
(United States) A Parks (United States) T Townsend	4	6	[10]
4	(United States) D Krawczyk (Netherlands) D Schuurs	6	0	[6]
PR	A Pavlyuchenkova (Brazil) L Stefani	2	1
2	(Australia) S Hunter (Belgium) E Mertens	6	6

Semifinals
(United States) A Parks (United States) T Townsend	6	6
2	(Australia) S Hunter (Belgium) E Mertens	4	2

== Seeded teams ==
The following are the seeded teams. Seedings are based on WTA rankings as of 7 August 2023.

Country	Player	Country	Player	Rank^{1}	Seed
CZE	Barbora Krejčíková	CZE	Kateřina Siniaková	3	1
AUS	Storm Hunter	BEL	Elise Mertens	11	2
USA	Nicole Melichar-Martinez	AUS	Ellen Perez	17	3
USA	Desirae Krawczyk	NED	Demi Schuurs	22	4
UKR	Lyudmyla Kichenok	LAT	Jeļena Ostapenko	34	5
TPE	Hsieh Su-wei	CHN	Wang Xinyu	38	6
TPE	Chan Hao-ching	MEX	Giuliana Olmos	41	7
JPN	Shuko Aoyama	JPN	Ena Shibahara	42	8

== Other entry information ==
=== Wild cards ===
- (United States) Jennifer Brady / (United States) Asia Muhammad
- ~~(United States) Bethanie Mattek-Sands / Anastasia Potapova~~
- (United States) Emma Navarro / (United States) Peyton Stearns

=== Protected ranking ===
- Anastasia Pavlyuchenkova / (Brazil) Luisa Stefani

=== Alternates ===
- Ekaterina Alexandrova / Aliaksandra Sasnovich
- (Norway) Ulrikke Eikeri / (China) Zhu Lin

=== Withdrawals ===
- (United States) Bethanie Mattek-Sands / Anastasia Potapova → replaced by Ekaterina Alexandrova / Aliaksandra Sasnovich
- (Czech Republic) Karolína Muchová / (Czech Republic) Markéta Vondroušová → replaced by (Norway) Ulrikke Eikeri / (China) Zhu Lin
