= WTA Lyon Open =

Female tennis tournament

Lyon Open

Defunct tennis tournament
- Founded: 2020
- Abolished: 2023
- Editions: 4 (2023)
- Location: Lyon, France
- Venue: Palais des Sports Gerland
- Category: WTA 250
- Surface: Hard (Indoor)
- Draw: 32S / 32Q / 16D
- Prize money: $259,303 (2023)

Current champions (2023)
- Singles: (United States) Alycia Parks
- Doubles: (Spain) Cristina Bucșa (Netherlands) Bibiane Schoofs

The WTA Lyon Open (sponsored by 6ème Sens) was a tournament for female professional tennis players that was held annually, debuting in the 2020 season. It was categorized as an WTA 250 level tournament and was part of the WTA Tour. The tournament was played on indoor hardcourts.

== Past finals ==
=== Singles ===
Year	Champion	Runner-up	Score
2020	(United States) Sofia Kenin	(Germany) Anna-Lena Friedsam	6–2, 4–6, 6–4
2021	(Denmark) Clara Tauson	(Switzerland) Viktorija Golubic	6–4, 6–1
2022	(China) Zhang Shuai	(Ukraine) Dayana Yastremska	3–6, 6–3, 6–4
2023	(United States) Alycia Parks	(France) Caroline Garcia	7–6^{(9–7)}, 7–5

=== Doubles ===
Year	Champions	Runners-up	Score
2020	(Romania) Laura Ioana Paar (Germany) Julia Wachaczyk	(Netherlands) Lesley Pattinama Kerkhove (Netherlands) Bibiane Schoofs	7–5, 6–4
2021	(Slovakia) Viktória Kužmová (Netherlands) Arantxa Rus	(Canada) Eugenie Bouchard (Serbia) Olga Danilović	3–6, 7–5, [10–7]
2022	(Germany) Laura Siegemund; Vera Zvonareva	(United Kingdom) Alicia Barnett (United Kingdom) Olivia Nicholls	7–5, 6–1
2023	(Spain) Cristina Bucșa (Netherlands) Bibiane Schoofs	(Serbia) Olga Danilović; Alexandra Panova	7–6^{(7–5)}, 6–3

== See also ==
- List of tennis tournaments
- ATP Lyon Open
