= Alycia Parks =

American tennis player (born 2000)

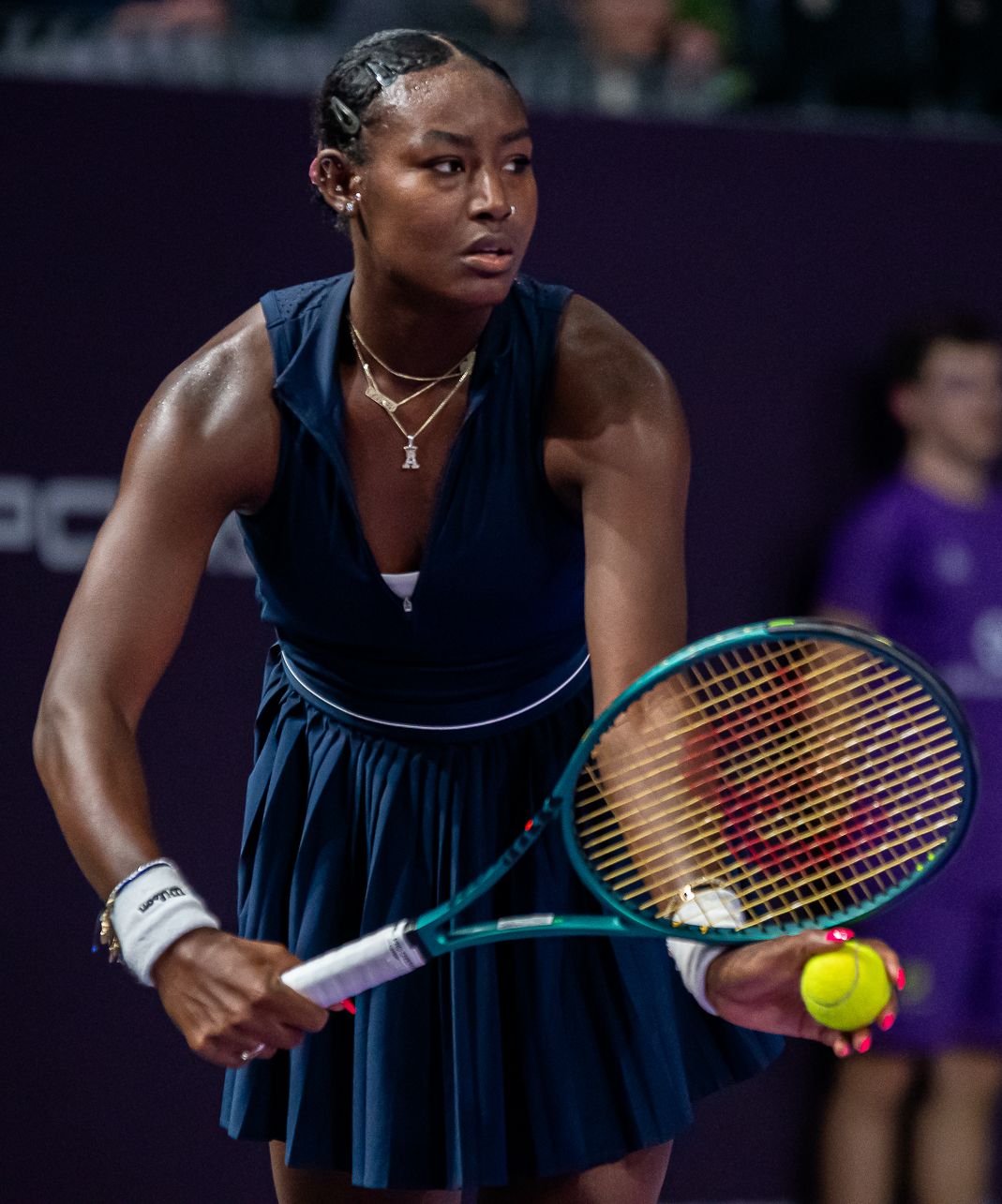
- Parks at the 2024 Transylvania Open
- Full name: Alycia Michelle Parks
- Country (sports): United States
- Residence: Port St. Lucie, Florida, US
- Born: December 31, 2000 (age 25) Atlanta, Georgia, US
- Height: 1.85 m (6 ft 1 in)
- Plays: Right-handed (two-handed backhand)
- Coach: Michael Parks (father)
- Prize money: US$ 3,405,915

Singles
- Career record: 240–247
- Career titles: 1
- Highest ranking: No. 40 (August 14, 2023)
- Current ranking: No. 89 (August 24, 2026)

Grand Slam singles results
- Australian Open: 3R (2024)
- French Open: 2R (2025, 2026)
- Wimbledon: 2R (2023, 2026)
- US Open: 1R (2021, 2023, 2025, 2026)

Doubles
- Career record: 102–114
- Career titles: 2
- Highest ranking: No. 27 (September 11, 2023)
- Current ranking: No. 208 (August 24, 2026)

Grand Slam doubles results
- Australian Open: 3R (2023)
- French Open: 2R (2023)
- Wimbledon: 2R (2024, 2025, 2026)
- US Open: 3R (2023)

Grand Slam mixed doubles results
- US Open: 2R (2023, 2024)
- Last updated on: August 28, 2026.

Alycia Michelle Parks (born December 31, 2000) is an American professional tennis player. She has a career-high WTA singles ranking of No. 40, reached in August 2023, and a career-high doubles ranking of world No. 27, achieved in September 2023. Parks has won one singles title and two doubles titles on the WTA Tour, including a WTA 1000 doubles title at the 2023 Cincinnati Open. She has also won five singles titles and three doubles titles on the WTA Challenger Tour.

== Career ==
=== 2021: WTA Tour & major debuts, fastest serve record ===
She made her WTA Tour main-draw debut at the 2021 MUSC Health Open in Charleston, having made it through qualifying as an alternate. She defeated qualifier Grace Min in the first round, before losing to top seed Ons Jabeur in the second.

In her first-round match at the US Open, she tied the record by Venus Williams for the fastest serve by a woman that the tournament had ever recorded (129 mph).

=== 2022: Breakthrough, first top-10 win & doubles title, top 75 ===
In 2022, she made her sixth career main-draw appearance advancing to the second round of the German Open in Berlin as a qualifier. As a result, she climbed to a career-high, up 34 spots from 169 to No. 135, on 20 June 2022.

Ranked No. 144 at the Ostrava Open, she defeated as a qualifier former world No. 1, Karolína Plíšková, for her first top-20 win and followed that by defeating world No. 7 and fourth seed, Maria Sakkari, for her first top-10 win to reach her first ever WTA Tour quarterfinal. At the same tournament in doubles, she won her maiden WTA Tour title, partnering Caty McNally.

In December, Parks won back-to-back WTA 125 singles titles in Andorrà and Angers, the latter of which she also claimed the doubles title at alongside Zhang Shuai. As a result of these successes, she reached the top 75 in singles and top 60 in doubles.

=== 2023: First singles title & top-5 win, top 40, WTA 1000 doubles title ===
As the top seed in the qualifying draw at the 2023 Australian Open, Parks lost in the second round to Sára Bejlek. At the same tournament, partnering with Oksana Kalashnikova, she reached the third round in doubles on her debut at this major losing to eventual champions, Barbora Krejčíková and Katerina Siniaková.

At the Lyon Open, she reached her first tour semifinal defeating Julia Grabher, fourth seed Petra Martić and seventh seeded Danka Kovinić. She defeated Maryna Zanevska to reach her first WTA Tour final. Next, she defeated top seed Caroline Garcia, recording her first top-5 win, to claim her maiden career title. As a result, she moved to new career-highs in the top 50, in doubles of No. 43 on February 13, 2023, and in singles of No. 50 on February 27, 2023.

At the Madrid Open, she defeated Anna Karolína Schmiedlová and 15th seed Viktoria Azarenka, in straight sets, to move into the third round for the first time at a WTA 1000 level. She lost to 18th seed Martina Trevisan.

Parks reached her second WTA Tour doubles final in Birmingham with Storm Hunter, losing to Barbora Krejčíková and Marta Kostyuk.

She qualified for Wimbledon and defeated Anna-Lena Friedsam in the first round, before losing to Ana Bogdan. Parks also reached the second rounds of the Canadian Open, losing to Belinda Bencic, and in Cincinnati, losing to Aliaksandra Sasnovich. In the doubles at the Cincinnati tournament, Parks paired with Taylor Townsend for the first time, going on to win title, defeating third seeds Nicole Melichar-Martinez and Ellen Perez in the final.

=== 2024: Australian Open third round, back to top 100 ===
At the Australian Open, Parks reached the third round of a major for the first time in her career with wins over Daria Snigur and 32nd seed Leylah Fernandez, before being eliminated in the third round by fourth seed Coco Gauff in straight sets. Despite this result, she fell out of the top 100 on February 5, 2024, not being able to defend her points from the Lyon Open which was cancelled in the 2024 season.

In doubles, at the Miami Open, she reached the semifinals with Asia Muhammad before losing to second seeds Gabriela Dabrowski and Erin Routliffe. As a result, she returned to the top 30 in the doubles rankings, at No. 29 on April 1. Parks won the title at the WTA 125 Veneto Open, defeating eighth seed Bernarda Pera in straight sets in the final. Partnering Hailey Baptiste, she also took the doubles title at the same event with a win over Miriam Kolodziejová and Anna Sisková in the final.

Ranked No. 121, she qualified for the main draw of the Wimbledon, losing in the first round to Caroline Wozniacki. In July, she won her second WTA 125 title for the season at the Polish Open, defeating fifth seed Maya Joint in the final. As a result, she moved 22 positions up on July 29, and a week later to world No. 99.

At the WTA 1000 China Open, she qualified and recorded her first main-draw win at a WTA Tour-level since January, at the Australian Open, over Wang Qiang, before losing to 23rd seed Magdalena Fręch in the second round.

Parks reached the final at the WTA 125 Midland Tennis Classic with wins over Lina Glushko, Caty McNally, Astra Sharma and Lauren Davis before losing to Rebecca Marino. In December, she won the WTA 125 Open Angers, overcoming Belinda Bencic in the final, having defeated Julie Belgraver, Tamara Korpatsch, Victoria Jiménez Kasintseva and Mona Barthel en route to the championship match. As a result, she re-entered the top 100 at world No. 84 on December 9, which was the same position she started off the year.

=== 2025: Two WTA Tour semifinals ===
Parks began the season at the Auckland Open, where she defeated third seed Amanda Anisimova, Greet Minnen and Katie Volynets, before losing to seventh seed Naomi Osaka in what was her first WTA Tour semifinal since her title ein in Lyon almost two years earlier.

In August at the Monterrey Open, she recorded wins over qualifier Cristina Bucșa, top seed Emma Navarro and Rebecca Šramková to reach the semifinals, at which point her run was ended by third seed and eventual champion Diana Shnaider.

Seeded third at the Jiangxi Open in October she overcame wildcard entrant Zhu Lin and Kaja Juvan to make it through to the quarterfinals, where she lost to eventual champion Anna Blinkova.

=== 2026: Ostrava quarterfinal ===
At the Ostrava Open, Parks defeated Julia Grabher and Elina Avanesyan, before losing in the quarterfinals to Katie Volynets, in three sets.

== Performance timelines ==
Key
W	F	SF	QF	#R	RR	Q#	DNQ	A	NH

(W) winner; (F) finalist; (SF) semifinalist; (QF) quarterfinalist; (#R) rounds 4, 3, 2, 1; (RR) round-robin stage; (Q#) qualification round; (DNQ) did not qualify; (A) absent; (NH) not held; (SR) strike rate (events won / competed); (W–L) win–loss record.
To avoid confusion and double counting, these charts are updated at the conclusion of a tournament or when the player's participation has ended.

Only main-draw results in WTA Tour, Grand Slam tournaments, Fed Cup/Billie Jean King Cup and Olympic Games are included in win–loss records.

=== Singles ===
Current through the 2026 Cincinnati Open.

Tournament	2021	2022	2023	2024	2025	2026	SR	W–L	Win%
Grand Slam tournaments
Australian Open	A	Q2	Q2	3R	Q1	2R	0 / 2	3–2	60%
French Open	A	Q1	1R	Q2	2R	2R	0 / 3	2–3	40%
Wimbledon	A	Q1	2R	1R	1R	2R	0 / 4	2–4	33%
US Open	1R	Q1	1R	Q2	1R		0 / 3	0–3	0%
Win–loss	0–1	0–0	1–3	2–2	1–3	3–3	0 / 12	7–12	37%
WTA 1000 tournaments
Qatar Open (Note: The first Premier 5 event of the year has switched back and forth between the Dubai Tennis Championships and the Qatar Ladies Open since 2009 until 2024. Dubai was classified as a Premier 5 event from 2009 to 2011 before being succeeded by Doha for the 2012–2014 period. In 2015, Dubai regained its Premier 5 status while Doha was demoted to Premier status. The Premier 5 tournaments were reclassified as WTA 1000 tournaments in 2021.)	A	A	A	Q1	2R	2R	0 / 2	2–2	50%
Dubai	A	A	A	Q1	2R	Q1	0 / 1	1–1	50%
Indian Wells Open	1R	Q1	1R	Q1	2R	1R	0 / 4	1–4	20%
Miami Open	A	Q2	1R	Q1	2R	3R	0 / 3	3–3	50%
Madrid Open	A	A	3R	Q1	2R	2R	0 / 3	4–3	57%
Italian Open	A	A	1R	Q1	1R		0 / 2	0–2	0%
Canadian Open	A	A	2R	Q1	1R	2R	0 / 3	2–3	40%
Cincinnati Open	Q1	A	Q2	A	1R	1R	0 / 2	0–2	0%
Guadalajara Open	NH	Q1	2R	NMS			0 / 1	1–1	50%
China Open	NH		1R	2R	1R		0 / 3	1–3	25%
Wuhan Open	NH			Q1	Q1		0 / 0	0–0	–
Win–loss	0–1	0–0	4–7	1–1	5–8	5–6	0 / 24	15–24	38%
Career statistics
	2021	2022	2023	2024	2025	2026	SR	W–L	Win%
Tournaments	4	3	21	10	16	13	Career total: 54		
Titles	0	0	1	0	0	0	Career total: 1		
Finals	0	0	1	0	0	0	Career total: 1		
Overall win-loss	2–4	3–3	13–21	4–10	12–16	10–13	1 / 68	44–67	40%
Year-end ranking (Note: 2017: WTA ranking–1208, 2018: WTA ranking–984, 2019: WTA ranking–410, 2020: WTA ranking–364.)	237	118	47	112	67		$2,944,450		

== Significant finals ==
=== WTA 1000 tournaments ===
==== Doubles: 1 (title) ====
Result	Year	Tournament	Surface	Partner	Opponents	Score
Win	2023	Cincinnati Open	Hard	(United States) Taylor Townsend	(United States) Nicole Melichar-Martinez (Australia) Ellen Perez	6–7^{(1–7)}, 6–4, [10–6]

== WTA Tour finals ==
=== Singles: 1 (title) ===
Legend WTA 250 (1–0)	Finals by surface Hard (1–0)

Result	W–L	Date	Tournament	Tier	Surface	Opponent	Score
Win	1–0	Feb 2023	Lyon Open, France	WTA 250	Hard (i)	(France) Caroline Garcia	7–6^{(9–7)}, 7–5

=== Doubles: 3 (2 titles, 1 runner-up) ===
Legend WTA 1000 (1–0) WTA 500 (1–0) WTA 250 (0–1)	Finals by surface Hard (2–0) Grass (0–1)	Finals by setting Outdoor (1–1) Indoor (1–0)

Result	W–L	Date	Tournament	Tier	Surface	Partner	Opponents	Score
Win	1–0	Oct 2022	Ostrava Open, Czech Republic	WTA 500	Hard (i)	(United States) Caty McNally	(Poland) Alicja Rosolska (New Zealand) Erin Routliffe	6–3, 6–2
Loss	1–1	Jun 2023	Birmingham Classic, UK	WTA 250	Grass	(Australia) Storm Hunter	(Ukraine) Marta Kostyuk (Czech Republic) Barbora Krejčíková	2–6, 6–7^{(7–9)}
Win	2–1	Aug 2023	Cincinnati Open, US	WTA 1000	Hard	(United States) Taylor Townsend	(United States) Nicole Melichar-Martinez (Australia) Ellen Perez	6–7^{(1–7)}, 6–4, [10–6]

== WTA 125 finals ==
=== Singles: 6 (5 titles, 1 runner-up) ===
Result	W–L	Date	Tournament	Surface	Opponent	Score
Win	1–0	Dec 2022	Andorrà Open, Andorra la Vella	Hard (i)	(Sweden) Rebecca Peterson	6–1, 6–4
Win	2–0	Dec 2022	Open Angers, France	Hard (i)	(Germany) Anna-Lena Friedsam	6–4, 4–6, 6–4
Win	3–0	Jun 2024	Veneto Open, Italy	Grass	(United States) Bernarda Pera	6–4, 6–1
Win	4–0	Jul 2024	Kozerki Open, Poland	Hard	(Australia) Maya Joint	4–6, 6–3, 6–3
Loss	4–1	Nov 2024	Midland Tennis Classic, US	Hard (i)	(Canada) Rebecca Marino	2–6, 1–6
Win	5–1	Dec 2024	Open Angers (2), France	Hard (i)	(Switzerland) Belinda Bencic	7–6^{(7–4)}, 3–6, 6–0

=== Doubles: 4 (3 titles, 1 runner-up) ===
Result	W–L	Date	Tournament	Surface	Partner	Opponents	Score
Win	1–0	Nov 2022	Midland Tennis Classic, US	Hard (i)	(United States) Asia Muhammad	(Germany) Anna-Lena Friedsam (Ukraine) Nadiia Kichenok	6–2, 6–3
Win	2–0	Dec 2022	Open Angers, France	Hard (i)	(China) Zhang Shuai	(Czech Republic) Miriam Kolodziejová (Czech Republic) Markéta Vondroušová	6–2, 6–2
Loss	2–1	May 2023	Clarins Open, France	Clay	(Ukraine) Nadiia Kichenok	(Kazakhstan) Anna Danilina; Vera Zvonareva	7–5, 6–7^{(2)}, [12–14]
Win	3–0	Jun 2024	Veneto Open, Italy	Grass	(United States) Hailey Baptiste	(Czech Republic) Miriam Kolodziejová (Czech Republic) Anna Sisková	7–6^{(4)}, 6–2

== ITF Circuit finals ==
=== Singles: 6 (1 title, 5 runner-ups) ===
Legend W60 tournaments (0–2) W25 tournaments (1–2) W15 tournaments (0–1)	Finals by surface Hard (1–4) Clay (0–1)

Result	W–L	Date	Tournament	Tier	Surface	Opponent	Score
Loss	0–1	Jun 2019	ITF Shreveport, United States	W15	Clay	(Chinese Taipei) Hsu Chieh-yu	2–6, 3–6
Loss	0–2	Sep 2019	ITF Redding, United States	W25	Hard	(Romania) Gabriela Talabă	1–6, 1–6
Win	1–2	Nov 2020	ITF Orlando, United States	W25	Hard	(United States) Robin Montgomery	3–6, 6–4, 6–2
Loss	1–3	Nov 2021	ITF Daytona Beach, United States	W25	Hard	(Romania) Irina Fetecău	1–6, 2–6
Loss	1–4	Feb 2022	Georgia's Rome Open, United States	W60	Hard (i)	(Germany) Tatjana Maria	4–6, 6–4, 2–6
Loss	1–5	Mar 2022	Arcadia Pro Open, United States	W60	Hard	(Canada) Rebecca Marino	6–7^{(0)}, 1–6

=== Doubles: 6 (3 titles, 3 runner-ups) ===
Legend W100 tournaments (1–0) W80 tournaments (0–1) W60 tournaments (1–1) W25 tournaments (1–1)	Finals by surface Hard (2–2) Clay (1–1)

Result	W–L	Date	Tournament	Tier	Surface	Partner	Opponents	Score
Win	1–0	Nov 2020	ITF Orlando, US	W25	Hard	(United States) Rasheeda McAdoo	(United States) Jamie Loeb (New Zealand) Erin Routliffe	4–6, 6–1, [11–9]
Loss	1–1	Oct 2021	Tennis Classic of Macon, US	W80	Hard	(United States) Alana Smith	(United States) Quinn Gleason (United States) Catherine Harrison	2–6, 2–6
Loss	1–2	Nov 2021	ITF Daytona Beach, US	W25	Hard	(Australia) Alexandra Osborne	(United States) Elysia Bolton (United States) Kylie Collins	4–6, 7–6^{(5)}, [5–10]
Win	2–2	Jan 2022	Bendigo International, Australia	W60+H	Hard	(Mexico) Fernanda Contreras Gómez	(Australia) Alison Bai (Australia) Alana Parnaby	6–3, 6–1
Loss	2–3	Apr 2022	Charlottesville Open, US	W60	Clay	(Greece) Valentini Grammatikopoulou	(United States) Sophie Chang (United States) Angela Kulikov	6–2, 3–6, [4–10]
Win	3–3	Jul 2022	ITF Charleston Pro, US	W100	Clay	(United States) Sachia Vickery	(Hungary) Tímea Babos (Mexico) Marcela Zacarías	6–4, 5–7, [10–5]

== Top 10 wins ==
Season	2022	2023	Total
Wins	1	1	2

#	Player	Rank	Event	Surface	Rd	Score	APR
2022
1.	(Greece) Maria Sakkari	No. 7	Ostrava Open, Czech Republic	Hard (i)	2R	5–7, 7–5, 7–5	No. 144
2023
2.	(France) Caroline Garcia	No. 5	Lyon Open, France	Hard (i)	F	7–6^{(9–7)}, 7–5	No. 79
