= 2024 Canberra Tennis International – Women's singles =

Women's singles
- 2024 Canberra Tennis International

Final
- Champion: (Spain) Nuria Párrizas Díaz
- Runner-up: (United Kingdom) Harriet Dart
- Score: 6–4, 6–3

Events
Singles	men	women
Doubles	men	women
← 2023 ·	Canberra Tennis International	· 2025 →

Katie Boulter was the defending champion but chose not to defend her title as she was competing at the United Cup being held during the same week.

Nuria Párrizas Díaz won the title, defeating Harriet Dart 6–4, 6–3 in the final.

== Seeds ==
1. (Switzerland) Viktorija Golubic (first round)
2. (Japan) Nao Hibino (quarterfinals)
3. (France) Océane Dodin (quarterfinals, retired)
4. (United Kingdom) Jodie Burrage (second round)
5. Kamilla Rakhimova (second round)
6. (China) Wang Yafan (second round)
7. (Mexico) Renata Zarazúa (first round)
8. (Italy) Sara Errani (first round)

== Draw ==
=== Key ===
- Q = Qualifier
- WC = Wild card
- LL = Lucky loser
- Alt = Alternate
- SE = Special exempt
- PR = Protected ranking
- ITF = ITF entry
- JE = Junior exempt
- w/o = Walkover
- r = Retired
- d = Defaulted
- SR = Special ranking

=== Finals ===
Semifinals
(Denmark) Clara Tauson	4	6^{4}
(Spain) Nuria Párrizas Díaz	6	7^{7}
(United States) Katie Volynets	5	6	5
(United Kingdom) Harriet Dart	7	3	7

Final
(Spain) Nuria Párrizas Díaz	6	6
(United Kingdom) Harriet Dart	4	3

=== Top half ===
First round
1	(Switzerland) V Golubic	2	4
(Denmark) C Tauson	6	6
Q	(France) F Ferro	7^{7}	6
(Brazil) L Pigossi	6^{5}	2
(Italy) L Stefanini	1	5
Q	(Germany) E Seidel	6	7
WC	(Australia) M Joint	6	6
8	(Italy) S Errani	2	3
3	(France) O Dodin	7^{7}	6
Q	(Ukraine) D Snigur	6^{2}	3
E Andreeva	6	6
Q	(Canada) R Marino	4	3
(Spain) N Párrizas Díaz	6	6
Q	(Switzerland) C Naef	3	1
Q	(Sweden) R Peterson	4	4
5	K Rakhimova	6	6

Second round
(Denmark) C Tauson	6	4	6
Q	(France) F Ferro	3	6	3
Q	(Germany) E Seidel	7	3	4
WC	(Australia) M Joint	5	6	6
3	(France) O Dodin	7^{7}	6^{6}	6
E Andreeva	6^{5}	7^{8}	4
(Spain) N Párrizas Díaz	6	0	6
5	K Rakhimova	4	6	3

Quarterfinals
(Denmark) C Tauson	6	6
WC	(Australia) M Joint	4	2
3	(France) O Dodin	2	1^{r}
(Spain) N Párrizas Díaz	6	3

Semifinals
(Denmark) C Tauson	4	6^{4}
(Spain) N Párrizas Díaz	6	7^{7}

=== Bottom half ===
First round
7	(Mexico) R Zarazúa	3	7^{7}	4
Q	(Australia) K McPhee	6	6^{4}	6
(United States) E Mandlik	2	0
(United States) K Volynets	6	6
(Hungary) A Bondár	6	6
(Colombia) E Arango	2	2
(Australia) A Sharma	2	4
4	(United Kingdom) J Burrage	6	6
6	(China) Y Wang	6	6
WC	(Australia) E Jones	4	2
(Germany) A-L Friedsam	6	4	3
(United Kingdom) H Dart	3	6	6
WC	(Australia) Melisa Ercan	0	4
WC	(Australia) T Preston	6	6
Q	(Canada) K Sebov	2	3
2	(Japan) N Hibino	6	6

Second round
Q	(Australia) K McPhee	2	2
(United States) K Volynets	6	6
(Hungary) A Bondár	6	3	6
4	(United Kingdom) J Burrage	4	6	3
6	(China) Y Wang	3	6	1
(United Kingdom) H Dart	6	1	6
WC	(Australia) T Preston	1	7	1
2	(Japan) N Hibino	6	5	6

Quarterfinals
(United States) K Volynets	6	6
(Hungary) A Bondár	2	3
(United Kingdom) H Dart	6	6
2	(Japan) N Hibino	3	0

Semifinals
(United States) K Volynets	5	6	5
(United Kingdom) H Dart	7	3	7

== Qualifying ==
=== Seeds ===
1. (Sweden) Rebecca Peterson (qualified)
2. (Ukraine) Daria Snigur (qualified)
3. (Germany) Eva Lys (first round)
4. (Latvia) Darja Semeņistaja (first round)
5. (Switzerland) Céline Naef (qualified)
6. Maria Timofeeva (first round)
7. (Canada) Katherine Sebov (qualified)
8. (Switzerland) Jil Teichmann (qualifying competition)
9. Anastasia Tikhonova (first round)
10. (Spain) Jéssica Bouzas Maneiro (qualifying competition)
11. (France) Fiona Ferro (qualified)
12. (Switzerland) Simona Waltert (qualifying competition)
13. (United States) Ann Li (first round)
14. (Ukraine) Katarina Zavatska (first round)
15. (Canada) Rebecca Marino (qualified)
16. (Germany) Noma Noha Akugue (first round)

=== Qualifiers ===
1. (Sweden) Rebecca Peterson
2. (Ukraine) Daria Snigur
3. (Germany) Ella Seidel
4. (Australia) Kaylah McPhee
5. (Switzerland) Céline Naef
6. (Canada) Rebecca Marino
7. (Canada) Katherine Sebov
8. (France) Fiona Ferro

=== Qualifying draw ===
==== First qualifier ====
First round
1	(Sweden) Rebecca Peterson	6	6
(Uzbekistan) Nigina Abduraimova	3	4
Polina Kudermetova	7	6
14	(Ukraine) Katarina Zavatska	5	2

Qualifying competition
1	(Sweden) Rebecca Peterson	6	3	6
Polina Kudermetova	2	6	1

==== Second qualifier ====
First round
2	(Ukraine) Daria Snigur	7	6
WC	(Australia) Tina Nadine Smith	5	2
(Cyprus) Raluca Șerban	6^{4}	6	3
12	(Switzerland) Simona Waltert	7^{7}	4	6

Qualifying competition
2	(Ukraine) Daria Snigur	6	6
12	(Switzerland) Simona Waltert	1	3

==== Third qualifier ====
First round
3	(Germany) Eva Lys	3	2
(Germany) Ella Seidel	6	6
WC	(Australia) Petra Hule	7	6^{5}	6
13	(United States) Ann Li	5	7^{7}	4

Qualifying competition
(Germany) Ella Seidel	4	6	6
WC	(Australia) Petra Hule	6	1	0

==== Fourth qualifier ====
First round
4	(Latvia) Darja Semeņistaja	3	4
WC	(Australia) Kaylah McPhee	6	6
(Slovenia) Veronika Erjavec	6^{6}	7^{7}	6
16	(Germany) Noma Noha Akugue	7^{8}	6^{4}	4

Qualifying competition
WC	(Australia) Kaylah McPhee	7	6
(Slovenia) Veronika Erjavec	5	3

==== Fifth qualifier ====
First round
5	(Switzerland) Céline Naef	6	7
(Philippines) Alexandra Eala	4	5
(France) Alice Robbe	2	3
10	(Spain) Jéssica Bouzas Maneiro	6	6

Qualifying competition
5	(Switzerland) Céline Naef	2	6	6
10	(Spain) Jéssica Bouzas Maneiro	6	3	0

==== Sixth qualifier ====
First round
6	Maria Timofeeva	6^{2}	4
Anastasia Zakharova	7^{7}	6
(United Kingdom) Yuriko Miyazaki	6^{6}	6	3
15	(Canada) Rebecca Marino	7^{8}	3	6

Qualifying competition
Anastasia Zakharova	2	3
15	(Canada) Rebecca Marino	6	6

==== Seventh qualifier ====
First round
7	(Canada) Katherine Sebov	6	6
Jana Kolodynska	4	4
(Croatia) Lea Bošković	6	6
9	Anastasia Tikhonova	1	2

Qualifying competition
7	(Canada) Katherine Sebov	7	3	6
(Croatia) Lea Bošković	5	6	1

==== Eighth qualifier ====
First round
8	(Switzerland) Jil Teichmann	6	6
WC	(Australia) Ivana Popovic	4	4
(United States) Elvina Kalieva	5	1
11	(France) Fiona Ferro	7	6

Qualifying competition
8	(Switzerland) Jil Teichmann	1	3
11	(France) Fiona Ferro	6	6
