= 2022 Open Villa de Madrid =

Tennis tournament

- Date: 14–20 November 2022
- Edition: 1st
- Category: ITF Women's World Tennis Tour
- Prize money: $80,000
- Surface: Clay
- Location: Madrid, Spain

Champions

Singles
- (Spain) Aliona Bolsova

Doubles
- (Spain) Aliona Bolsova / (Spain) Rebeka Masarova
Open Villa de Madrid	· 2023 →

The 2022 Open Villa de Madrid was a professional tennis tournament played on outdoor clay courts. It was the first edition of the tournament which was part of the 2022 ITF Women's World Tennis Tour. It took place in Madrid, Spain between 14 and 20 November 2022.

== Champions ==
=== Singles ===
- (Spain) Aliona Bolsova def. (Germany) Tamara Korpatsch, 6–4, 6–2

=== Doubles ===
- (Spain) Aliona Bolsova / (Spain) Rebeka Masarova def. (Croatia) Lea Bošković / (Latvia) Daniela Vismane, 6–3, 6–3

== Singles main draw entrants ==
=== Seeds ===
Country	Player	Rank^{1}	Seed
GER	Tamara Korpatsch	89	1
ESP	Cristina Bucșa	107	2
FRA	Océane Dodin	108	3
FRA	Kristina Mladenovic	112	4
POL	Magdalena Fręch	116	5
ESP	Rebeka Masarova	132	6
SUI	Ylena In-Albon	152	7
GRE	Despina Papamichail	156	8

- ^{1} Rankings are as of 7 November 2022.

=== Other entrants ===
The following players received wildcards into the singles main draw:

- (Spain) Andrea Lázaro García
- (Spain) Guiomar Maristany
- (Spain) Lidia Moreno Arias
- (Spain) Marta Soriano Santiago

The following players received entry from the qualifying draw:

- (Belgium) Marie Benoît
- (Croatia) Lea Bošković
- (Italy) Diletta Cherubini
- (Malta) Francesca Curmi
- (Burundi) Sada Nahimana
- (France) Lucie Nguyen Tan
- (Romania) Andreea Prisăcariu
- Iryna Shymanovich
