= 2023 Open Villa de Madrid =

Tennis tournament

- Date: 15–21 May 2023
- Edition: 2nd
- Category: ITF Women's World Tennis Tour
- Prize money: $100,000
- Surface: Clay / Outdoor
- Location: Madrid, Spain

Champions

Singles
- (Serbia) Olga Danilović

Doubles
- (Japan) Mai Hontama / (Japan) Eri Hozumi
← 2022 ·	Open Villa de Madrid	· 2024 →

The 2023 Open Villa de Madrid was a professional tennis tournament played on outdoor clay courts. It was the second edition of the tournament, which was part of the 2023 ITF Women's World Tennis Tour. It took place in Madrid, Spain, between 15 and 21 May 2023.

== Champions ==
=== Singles ===
- (Serbia) Olga Danilović def. (Spain) Sara Sorribes Tormo, 6–2, 6–3

=== Doubles ===
- (Japan) Mai Hontama / (Japan) Eri Hozumi def. (Greece) Eleni Christofi / (Greece) Despina Papamichail, 6–0, 7–5

== Singles main draw entrants ==
=== Seeds ===
Country	Player	Rank	Seed
CAN	Leylah Fernandez	50	1
USA	Emma Navarro	83	2
HUN	Dalma Gálfi	91	3
ARG	Nadia Podoroska	101	4
NED	Arantxa Rus	107	5
AUS	Kimberly Birrell	111	6
SUI	Simona Waltert	122	7
ESP	Marina Bassols Ribera	124	8

- Rankings are as of 8 May 2023.

=== Other entrants ===
The following players received wildcards into the singles main draw:

- (Spain) Irene Burillo Escorihuela
- (Canada) Leylah Fernandez
- (Spain) Ángela Fita Boluda
- (Spain) Marta Soriano Santiago

The following players received entry from the qualifying draw:

- (Spain) Lucía Cortez Llorca
- (Netherlands) Suzan Lamens
- (Spain) Andrea Lázaro García
- (Spain) Lidia Moreno Arias
- (Switzerland) Conny Perrin
- Tatiana Prozorova
- (Italy) Miriana Tona
- (Ukraine) Katarina Zavatska
