= 2026 Open Villa de Madrid =

- Date: 6–12 April
- Edition: 5th
- Category: WTA 125
- Prize money: €100,000
- Surface: Clay / Outdoor
- Location: Madrid, Spain

Champions

Singles
- (Italy) Lisa Pigato

Doubles
- (Spain) Irene Burillo / Elena Pridankina
- Open Villa de Madrid

The 2026 Open Villa de Madrid, also known as Grand Prix Open Villa de Madrid by Silverway, for sponsorship reasons, was a professional women's tennis tournament played on outdoor clay courts. It was the fifth edition of the tournament and first as a WTA 125 tournament, which was part of the 2026 season. It took place at the Club de Campo Villa de Madrid in Madrid, Spain, between 6 and 12 April 2026.

== Singles main draw entrants ==
=== Seeds ===
Country	Player	Rank^{1}	Seed
RUS	Oksana Selekhmeteva	74	1
SUI	Simona Waltert	88	2
CZE	Nikola Bartůňková	95	3
LAT	Darja Semeņistaja	98	4
GBR	Francesca Jones	101	5
EGY	Mayar Sherif	102	6
CHN	Yuan Yue	121	7
RUS	Alina Korneeva	123	8

- ^{1} Rankings as of 30 March 2026.

=== Other entrants ===
The following players received a wildcard into the singles main draw:

- (Spain) Irene Burillo
- (Spain) Carmen Gallardo Guevara
- (Spain) María García Cid
- (Spain) Ane Mintegi del Olmo

The following player received entry into the singles main draw through a protected ranking:

- (United States) Robin Montgomery

The following players received entry from the qualifying draw:

- (Armenia) Elina Avanesyan
- (Slovenia) Polona Hercog
- (Japan) Sara Saito
- (Germany) Caroline Werner

The following player received entry as a lucky loser:

- (France) Séléna Janicijevic

=== Withdrawals ===
Before the tournament

- (Colombia) Emiliana Arango → replaced by (Spain) Andrea Lázaro García
- Anna Blinkova → replaced by Elena Pridankina
- (Belgium) Sofia Costoulas → replaced by (France) Jessika Ponchet
- (Chinese Taipei) Joanna Garland → replaced by (France) Séléna Janicijevic
- (Netherlands) Suzan Lamens → replaced by (North Macedonia) Lina Gjorcheska
- (Greece) Despina Papamichail → replaced by (United States) Elizabeth Mandlik
- Anastasia Pavlyuchenkova → replaced by Elena Pridankina
- (Ukraine) Yuliia Starodubtseva → replaced by (United States) Carol Young Suh Lee
- (Czech Republic) Darja Viďmanová → replaced by (Czech Republic) Laura Samson

=== Retirements ===
- (Slovenia) Polona Hercog
- Alina Korneeva

== Doubles entrants ==
=== Seeds ===
Country	Player	Country	Player	Rank^{1}	Seed
ESP	Irene Burillo		Elena Pridankina	214	1
GBR	Madeleine Brooks	USA	Ivana Corley	216	2
TPE	Cho I-hsuan	TPE	Cho Yi-tsen	226	3
FRA	Estelle Cascino	SUI	Naïma Karamoko	244	4

- Rankings as of 30 March 2026.

=== Other entrants ===
The following pair received a wildcard into the doubles main draw:

- (Spain) Carmen Gallardo Guevara / (Spain) María García Cid

=== Withdrawals ===
Before the tournament

- (Italy) Angelica Moratelli / (France) Jessika Ponchet
- (Netherlands) Arantxa Rus / (Egypt) Mayar Sherif

== Champions ==
=== Singles ===
- (Italy) Lisa Pigato def. (Spain) Marina Bassols Ribera 6–4, 6–0

=== Doubles ===
- (Spain) Irene Burillo / Elena Pridankina def. (Romania) Irina Bara / (Latvia) Darja Semeņistaja 4–6, 6–3, [10–3]
