= 2024 Canberra Tennis International – Men's singles =

Men's singles
- 2024 Canberra Tennis International

Final
- Champion: (Germany) Dominik Koepfer
- Runner-up: (Czech Republic) Jakub Menšík
- Score: 6–3, 6–2

Events
Singles	men	women
Doubles	men	women
← 2023 ·	Canberra Tennis International	· 2025 →

Márton Fucsovics was the defending champion but chose to compete at the Brisbane International instead.

Dominik Koepfer won the title after defeating Jakub Menšík 6–3, 6–2 in the final.

== Seeds ==
1. (Germany) Dominik Koepfer (champion)
2. (France) Alexandre Müller (first round)
3. (Argentina) Facundo Díaz Acosta (first round)
4. (France) Arthur Rinderknech (first round)
5. (United States) Michael Mmoh (second round)
6. (Belgium) David Goffin (quarterfinals)
7. (Italy) Luca Nardi (first round)
8. (Slovakia) Alex Molčan (first round)

== Draw ==
=== Key ===
- Q = Qualifier
- WC = Wild card
- LL = Lucky loser
- Alt = Alternate
- SE = Special exempt
- PR = Protected ranking
- ITF = ITF entry
- JE = Junior exempt
- w/o = Walkover
- r = Retired
- d = Defaulted
- SR = Special ranking

=== Finals ===
Semifinals
1	(Germany) Dominik Koepfer	6^{5}	7	6
(Canada) Gabriel Diallo	7^{7}	5	3
(Czech Republic) Jakub Menšík	7	7
(United States) Brandon Nakashima	5	5

Final
1	(Germany) Dominik Koepfer	6	6
(Czech Republic) Jakub Menšík	3	2

=== Top half ===
First round
1	(Germany) D Koepfer	6	6
(United States) Z Svajda	2	4
Q	(Italy) A Vavassori	6^{1}	6	7
(India) S Nagal	7^{7}	4	5
(South Africa) L Harris	7	7^{7}
(Austria) F Misolic	5	6^{4}
WC	(Australia) A Walton	4	5
6	(Belgium) D Goffin	6	7
3	(Argentina) F Díaz Acosta	6^{7}	3
Q	(Germany) R Molleker	7^{9}	6
(Canada) G Diallo	4	6	6
(Argentina) JM Cerúndolo	6	3	0
Q	(Italy) M Gigante	7^{7}	4	6
(United States) E Nava	6^{4}	6	3
WC	(Australia) Pavle Marinkov	6	6
7	(Italy) L Nardi	4	1

Second round
1	(Germany) D Koepfer	6	6
Q	(Italy) A Vavassori	4	4
(South Africa) L Harris	4	4
6	(Belgium) D Goffin	6	6
Q	(Germany) R Molleker	6^{5}	3
(Canada) G Diallo	7^{7}	6
Q	(Italy) M Gigante	6	6
WC	(Australia) P Marinkov	1	0

Quarterfinals
1	(Germany) D Koepfer	7^{7}	6
6	(Belgium) D Goffin	6^{5}	3
(Canada) G Diallo	7^{7}	6
Q	(Italy) M Gigante	6^{2}	2

Semifinals
1	(Germany) D Koepfer	6^{5}	7	6
(Canada) G Diallo	7^{7}	5	3

=== Bottom half ===
First round
8	(Slovakia) A Molčan	5	4
Q	(Kazakhstan) D Yevseyev	7	6
(Czech Republic) J Menšík	6	7
(Germany) B Hassan	3	5
PR	(Czech Republic) J Veselý	3	5
Q	(Switzerland) A Ritschard	6	7
(Bosnia and Herzegovina) D Džumhur	6	3	6
4	(France) A Rinderknech	4	6	3
5	(United States) M Mmoh	6	6
(Croatia) D Ajduković	2	4
WC	(Australia) T Schoolkate	6	6
Q	(Australia) Casey Hoole	3	4
(Moldova) R Albot	7^{7}	1	2
(Croatia) D Prižmić	6^{4}	6	6
(United States) B Nakashima	5	7^{9}	7^{7}
2	(France) A Müller	7	6^{7}	6^{5}

Second round
Q	(Kazakhstan) D Yevseyev	4	4
(Czech Republic) J Menšík	6	6
Q	(Switzerland) A Ritschard	6	2
(Bosnia and Herzegovina) D Džumhur	1	1^{r}
5	(United States) M Mmoh	7^{7}	1	6^{5}
WC	(Australia) T Schoolkate	6^{4}	6	7^{7}
(Croatia) D Prižmić	2	1
(United States) B Nakashima	6	6

Quarterfinals
(Czech Republic) J Menšík	w/o
Q	(Switzerland) A Ritschard
WC	(Australia) T Schoolkate	4	4
(United States) B Nakashima	6	6

Semifinals
(Czech Republic) J Menšík	7	7
(United States) B Nakashima	5	5
