= 2025 Canberra Tennis International – Women's singles =

Women's singles
- 2025 Canberra Tennis International

Final
- Champion: (Japan) Aoi Ito
- Runner-up: (China) Wei Sijia
- Score: 6–4, 6–3

Events
Singles	men	women
Doubles	men	women
- Canberra Tennis International

Nuria Párrizas Díaz was the defending champion but lost in the semifinals to Aoi Ito.

Ito won the title, defeating Wei Sijia 6–4, 6–3 in the final.

== Seeds ==
1. (Spain) Nuria Párrizas Díaz (semifinals)
2. (Hungary) Anna Bondár (first round)
3. Anastasia Zakharova (first round)
4. (Latvia) Darja Semeņistaja (first round)
5. (Croatia) Petra Martić (first round)
6. (Canada) Marina Stakusic (second round)
7. (Japan) Aoi Ito (champion)
8. (Thailand) Mananchaya Sawangkaew (second round)

== Draw ==
Key

- Q = Qualifier
- WC = Wild card
- LL = Lucky loser
- Alt = Alternate
- ITF = ITF entry
- PR = Protected ranking
- SR = Special ranking
- SE = Special exempt
- JE = Junior exempt
- JR = Junior Accelerator Programme entrant
- CO = College Accelerator Programme entrant
- NG = Next Gen Accelerator Program entrant
- w/o = Walkover
- r = Retired
- d = Defaulted

=== Finals ===
Semifinals
1	(Spain) Nuria Párrizas Díaz	2	2
7	(Japan) Aoi Ito	6	6
(China) Wei Sijia	7	6
Q	(Philippines) Alexandra Eala	5	2

Final
7	(Japan) Aoi Ito	6	6
(China) Wei Sijia	4	3

=== Top half ===
First round
1	(Spain) N Párrizas Díaz	3	6	7^{7}
(Croatia) J Fett	6	4	6^{5}
PR	(Montenegro) D Kovinić	6^{3}	1
Q	(Japan) S Saito	7^{7}	6
(Hungary) D Gálfi	6	2	6
(Ukraine) D Snigur	4	6	3
Q	O Selekhmeteva	6	3	7^{7}
5	(Croatia) P Martić	3	6	6^{4}
3	A Zakharova	3	3
WC	(Australia) P Hule	6	6
PR	(Serbia) N Stojanović	6	6
Q	(Argentina) S Sierra	2	1
A Sasnovich	6	3	6
(Switzerland) J Teichmann	4	6	3
M Timofeeva	4	5
7	(Japan) A Ito	6	7

Second round
1	(Spain) N Párrizas Díaz	6	6
Q	(Japan) S Saito	2	4
(Hungary) D Gálfi	3	6	5
Q	O Selekhmeteva	6	2	7
WC	(Australia) P Hule	2	3
PR	(Serbia) N Stojanović	6	6
A Sasnovich	1	2
7	(Japan) A Ito	6	6

Quarterfinals
1	(Spain) N Párrizas Díaz	6	6
Q	O Selekhmeteva	3	3
PR	(Serbia) N Stojanović	2	6^{6}
7	(Japan) A Ito	6	7^{8}

Semifinals
1	(Spain) N Párrizas Díaz	2	2
7	(Japan) A Ito	6	6

=== Bottom half ===
First round
8	(Thailand) M Sawangkaew	4	6	6
(Germany) E Seidel	6	2	3
(China) S Wei	6	6
WC	(Australia) L Cabrera	3	4
Q	(France) E Jacquemot	6	6
WC	(Australia) E Jones	2	3
Q	(Switzerland) S Waltert	6	6
4	(Latvia) D Semeņistaja	2	1
6	(Canada) M Stakusic	0	7^{7}	6
(Croatia) A Ružić	6	6^{1}	1
Q	(Turkey) İ Öz	3	6^{4}
WC	(Australia) T Preston	6	7^{7}
Q	(Philippines) A Eala	6	6
Q	(Austria) S Kraus	2	4
(Netherlands) A Hartono	6	4	6
2	(Hungary) A Bondár	3	6	3

Second round
8	(Thailand) M Sawangkaew	3	2
(China) S Wei	6	6
Q	(France) E Jacquemot	1	4
Q	(Switzerland) S Waltert	6	6
6	(Canada) M Stakusic	6	3	1
WC	(Australia) T Preston	4	6	6
Q	(Philippines) A Eala	6	6
(Netherlands) A Hartono	3	3

Quarterfinals
(China) S Wei	6	6
Q	(Switzerland) S Waltert	1	4
WC	(Australia) T Preston	6	2	1
Q	(Philippines) A Eala	4	6	6

Semifinals
(China) S Wei	7	6
Q	(Philippines) A Eala	5	2

== Qualifying ==
=== Seeds ===
1. (Philippines) Alexandra Eala (qualified)
2. (Japan) Sara Saito (qualified)
3. (Czech Republic) Dominika Šalková (first round)
4. (France) Elsa Jacquemot (qualified)
5. (Argentina) Solana Sierra (qualified)
6. (Slovenia) Veronika Erjavec (first round)
7. (Switzerland) Simona Waltert (qualified)
8. Oksana Selekhmeteva (qualified)
9. (Czech Republic) Barbora Palicová (qualifying competition)
10. (Slovenia) Tamara Zidanšek (first round)
11. (Serbia) Lola Radivojević (first round)
12. Elena Pridankina (qualifying competition)
13. (Netherlands) Anouk Koevermans (qualifying competition)
14. (Czech Republic) Linda Fruhvirtová (qualifying competition, withdrew)
15. (Italy) Giorgia Pedone (first round)
16. (Japan) Sayaka Ishii (qualifying competition)

=== Qualifiers ===
1. (Philippines) Alexandra Eala
2. (Japan) Sara Saito
3. (Turkey) İpek Öz
4. (France) Elsa Jacquemot
5. (Argentina) Solana Sierra
6. (Austria) Sinja Kraus
7. (Switzerland) Simona Waltert
8. Oksana Selekhmeteva

=== Qualifying draw ===
==== First qualifier ====
First round
1	(Philippines) Alexandra Eala	6	6
WC	(Australia) Catherine Aulia	1	2
WC	(Australia) Alana Subasic	6	6
15	(Italy) Giorgia Pedone	2	3

Qualifying competition
1	(Philippines) Alexandra Eala	5	6	6
WC	(Australia) Alana Subasic	7	0	1

==== Second qualifier ====
First round
2	(Japan) Sara Saito	3	6	7
WC	(Australia) Jaimee Fourlis	6	1	5
(Croatia) Lea Bošković	3	7	6
10	(Slovenia) Tamara Zidanšek	6	5	2

Qualifying competition
2	(Japan) Sara Saito	7	6
(Croatia) Lea Bošković	5	2

==== Third qualifier ====
First round
3	(Czech Republic) Dominika Šalková	5	3
(Turkey) İpek Öz	7	6
(Switzerland) Leonie Küng	3	6	4
12	Elena Pridankina	6	3	6

Qualifying competition
(Turkey) İpek Öz	6	6
12	Elena Pridankina	1	2

==== Fourth qualifier ====
First round
4	(France) Elsa Jacquemot	6	6
(United States) Hanna Chang	0	1
(France) Margaux Rouvroy	6	6
11	(Serbia) Lola Radivojević	2	2

Qualifying competition
4	(France) Elsa Jacquemot	6	6
(France) Margaux Rouvroy	4	3

==== Fifth qualifier ====
First round
5	(Argentina) Solana Sierra	6	6
(Switzerland) Susan Bandecchi	4	2
(Australia) Elena Micic	4	1
9	(Czech Republic) Barbora Palicová	6	6

Qualifying competition
5	(Argentina) Solana Sierra	6	6
9	(Czech Republic) Barbora Palicová	0	2

==== Sixth qualifier ====
First round
6	(Slovenia) Veronika Erjavec	3	5
(Austria) Sinja Kraus	6	7
WC	(Australia) Kaylah McPhee	3	3
14	(Czech Republic) Linda Fruhvirtová	6	6

Qualifying competition
(Austria) Sinja Kraus	w/o
14	(Czech Republic) Linda Fruhvirtová

==== Seventh qualifier ====
First round
7	(Switzerland) Simona Waltert	7^{9}	7^{9}
(Australia) Gabriella Da Silva-Fick	6^{7}	6^{7}
Aliona Falei	3	5
13	(Netherlands) Anouk Koevermans	6	7

Qualifying competition
7	(Switzerland) Simona Waltert	5	6	7^{7}
13	(Netherlands) Anouk Koevermans	7	3	6^{4}

==== Eighth qualifier ====
First round
8	Oksana Selekhmeteva	7^{7}	5	6
(Cyprus) Raluca Șerban	6^{2}	7	4
(Slovenia) Dalila Jakupović	4	3
16	(Japan) Sayaka Ishii	6	6

Qualifying competition
8	Oksana Selekhmeteva	6^{2}	6	6
16	(Japan) Sayaka Ishii	7^{7}	3	3
