= 2022 Open Villa de Madrid – Singles =

Singles
- 2022 Open Villa de Madrid

Final
- Champion: (Spain) Aliona Bolsova
- Runner-up: (Germany) Tamara Korpatsch
- Score: 6–4, 6–2

Events
Singles	Doubles
Open Villa de Madrid	· 2023 →

This was the first edition of the tournament.

Aliona Bolsova won the title, defeating Tamara Korpatsch in the final, 6–4, 6–2.

== Seeds ==
1. (Germany) Tamara Korpatsch (final)
2. (Spain) Cristina Bucșa (second round)
3. (France) Océane Dodin (second round)
4. (France) Kristina Mladenovic (first round)
5. (Poland) Magdalena Fręch (semifinals)
6. (Spain) Rebeka Masarova (first round)
7. (Switzerland) Ylena In-Albon (semifinals)
8. (Greece) Despina Papamichail (first round)

== Draw ==
=== Key ===
- Q = Qualifier
- WC = Wild card
- LL = Lucky loser
- Alt = Alternate
- SE = Special exempt
- PR = Protected ranking
- ITF = ITF entry
- JE = Junior exempt
- w/o = Walkover
- r = Retired
- d = Defaulted
- SR = Special ranking

=== Finals ===
Semifinals
1	(Germany) Tamara Korpatsch	6	6
5	(Poland) Magdalena Fręch	1	0
7	(Switzerland) Ylena In-Albon	2	2
(Spain) Aliona Bolsova	6	6

Final
1	(Germany) Tamara Korpatsch	4	2
(Spain) Aliona Bolsova	6	6

=== Top half ===
First round
1	(Germany) T Korpatsch	6	6
WC	(Spain) L Moreno Arias	1	1
(Latvia) D Vismane	2	3
(Spain) L Romero Gormaz	6	6
(Spain) Á Fita Boluda	1	5
(Spain) J Bouzas Maneiro	6	7
(Netherlands) S Lamens	7	6
6	(Spain) R Masarova	5	4
3	(France) O Dodin	6	5	6
WC	(Spain) G Maristany	3	7	3
(Austria) S Kraus	2	6	4
Q	(Malta) F Curmi	6	3	6
I Khromacheva	2	7^{7}	6
(France) C Monnet	6	6^{5}	0
WC	(Spain) M Soriano Santiago	6	0	3
5	(Poland) M Fręch	4	6	6

Second round
1	(Germany) T Korpatsch	4	6	6
(Spain) L Romero Gormaz	6	3	3
(Spain) J Bouzas Maneiro	4	6^{3}
(Netherlands) S Lamens	6	7^{7}
3	(France) O Dodin	3	2
Q	(Malta) F Curmi	6	6
I Khromacheva	2	3
5	(Poland) M Fręch	6	6

Quarterfinals
1	(Germany) T Korpatsch	6	6
(Netherlands) S Lamens	2	1
Q	(Malta) F Curmi	4	4
5	(Poland) M Fręch	6	6

Semifinals
1	(Germany) T Korpatsch	6	6
5	(Poland) M Fręch	1	0

=== Bottom half ===
First round
7	(Switzerland) Y In-Albon	6^{4}	6	6
Q	(Burundi) S Nahimana	7^{7}	4	2
(Croatia) T Lukas	6	4	2
WC	(Spain) A Lázaro García	1	6	6
Q	(Romania) A Prisăcariu	1	1
(Spain) M Bassols Ribera	6	6
Q	(Italy) D Cherubini	6	6
4	(France) K Mladenovic	3	4
8	(Greece) D Papamichail	3	6^{5}
Q	(Belgium) M Benoît	6	7^{7}
Q	(Croatia) L Bošković	3	3
(Spain) A Bolsova	6	6
Q	(France) L Nguyen Tan	1	1
Q	I Shymanovich	6	6
(Italy) C Rosatello	5	1
2	(Spain) C Bucșa	7	6

Second round
7	(Switzerland) Y In-Albon	6	6
WC	(Spain) A Lázaro García	3	2
(Spain) M Bassols Ribera	3	6	6
Q	(Italy) D Cherubini	6	2	3
Q	(Belgium) M Benoît	4	6	2
(Spain) A Bolsova	6	0	6
Q	I Shymanovich	6	6
2	(Spain) C Bucșa	2	0

Quarterfinals
7	(Switzerland) Y In-Albon	6	6
(Spain) M Bassols Ribera	2	3
(Spain) A Bolsova	6	6
Q	I Shymanovich	2	2

Semifinals
7	(Switzerland) Y In-Albon	2	2
(Spain) A Bolsova	6	6
