= 2026 Open Villa de Madrid – Singles =

Singles
- 2026 Open Villa de Madrid

Final
- Champion: (Italy) Lisa Pigato
- Runner-up: (Spain) Marina Bassols Ribera
- Score: 6–4, 6–0

Details
- Draw: 32 (4Q / 4WC)
- Seeds: 8

Events
Singles	Doubles
- Open Villa de Madrid

Mayar Sherif was the defending champion but lost in the first round to Polina Kudermetova.

Lisa Pigato won the title, defeating Marina Bassols Ribera 6–4, 6–0 in the final.

== Seeds ==
1. Oksana Selekhmeteva (quarterfinals)
2. (Switzerland) Simona Waltert (first round)
3. (Czech Republic) Nikola Bartůňková (second round)
4. (Latvia) Darja Semeņistaja (first round)
5. (United Kingdom) Francesca Jones (second round)
6. (Egypt) Mayar Sherif (first round)
7. (China) Yuan Yue (second round)
8. Alina Korneeva (second round, retired)

== Draw ==
Key

- Q = Qualifier
- WC = Wild card
- LL = Lucky loser
- Alt = Alternate
- ITF = ITF entry
- PR = Protected ranking
- SR = Special ranking
- SE = Special exempt
- JE = Junior exempt
- JR = Junior Accelerator Programme entrant
- CO = College Accelerator Programme entrant
- NG = Next Gen Accelerator Program entrant
- w/o = Walkover
- r = Retired
- d = Defaulted

=== Finals ===
Semifinals
(Uzbekistan) Polina Kudermetova	0	6	1
(Italy) Lisa Pigato	6	2	6
WC	(Spain) Ane Mintegi del Olmo	3	4
(Spain) Marina Bassols Ribera	6	6

Final
(Italy) Lisa Pigato	6	6
(Spain) Marina Bassols Ribera	4	0

=== Top half ===
First round
1	O Selekhmeteva	4	6	7^{8}
LL	(France) S Janicijevic	6	4	6^{6}
(Netherlands) A Rus	6^{8}	5
(United States) CYS Lee	7^{10}	7
(Italy) N Brancaccio	6^{5}	1
(France) J Ponchet	7^{7}	6
(Uzbekistan) P Kudermetova	6	7
6	(Egypt) M Sherif	1	5
4	(Latvia) D Semeņistaja	6	2	3
(Italy) L Pigato	4	6	6
(Czech Republic) L Samson	6	6
E Pridankina	2	4
(North Macedonia) L Gjorcheska	6	6
Q	(Japan) S Saito	4	4
WC	(Spain) M García Cid	3	3
8	A Korneeva	6	6

Second round
1	O Selekhmeteva	7	6
(United States) CYS Lee	5	2
(France) J Ponchet	1	2
(Uzbekistan) P Kudermetova	6	6
(Italy) L Pigato	4	6	6
(Czech Republic) L Samson	6	2	3
(North Macedonia) L Gjorcheska	3	1
8	A Korneeva	6	0^{r}

Quarterfinals
1	O Selekhmeteva	3	6^{3}
(Uzbekistan) P Kudermetova	6	7^{7}
(Italy) L Pigato	6	6
(North Macedonia) L Gjorcheska	4	2

Semifinals
(Uzbekistan) P Kudermetova	0	6	1
(Italy) L Pigato	6	2	6

=== Bottom half ===
First round
5	(United Kingdom) F Jones	4	7^{7}	7^{7}
(United States) E Mandlik	6	6^{2}	6^{4}
Q	(Armenia) E Avanesyan	6	7
(Spain) A Lázaro García	4	5
WC	(Spain) A Mintegi del Olmo	6	6
WC	(Spain) I Burillo	4	0
Q	(Germany) C Werner	6^{4}	4
3	(Czech Republic) N Bartůňková	7^{7}	6
7	(China) Y Yuan	6	5	6
WC	(Spain) C Gallardo Guevara	2	7	4
(Spain) M Bassols Ribera	6	2
Q	(Slovenia) P Hercog	3	1^{r}
PR	(United States) R Montgomery	6	4	4
(United States) E Kalieva	4	6	6
(United States) W Osuigwe	3	6	6
2	(Switzerland) S Waltert	6	3	2

Second round
5	(United Kingdom) F Jones	2	3
Q	(Armenia) E Avanesyan	6	6
WC	(Spain) A Mintegi del Olmo	3	6	6
3	(Czech Republic) N Bartůňková	6	2	1
7	(China) Y Yuan	6	4	4
(Spain) M Bassols Ribera	1	6	6
(United States) E Kalieva	6	7
(United States) W Osuigwe	2	5

Quarterfinals
Q	(Armenia) E Avanesyan	3	3
WC	(Spain) A Mintegi del Olmo	6	6
(Spain) M Bassols Ribera	6	6
(United States) E Kalieva	4	1

Semifinals
WC	(Spain) A Mintegi del Olmo	3	4
(Spain) M Bassols Ribera	6	6

== Qualifying ==
=== Seeds ===
1. (Germany) Caroline Werner (qualified)
2. (France) Séléna Janicijevic (qualifying competition, lucky loser)
3. (Slovenia) Polona Hercog (qualified)
4. (Japan) Sara Saito (qualified)
5. (Italy) Miriana Tona (qualifying competition)
6. (Spain) Carlota Martínez Círez (qualifying competition)
7. (Armenia) Elina Avanesyan (qualified)
8. (Spain) Cristina Díaz Adrover (qualifying competition)

=== Qualifiers ===
1. (Germany) Caroline Werner
2. (Armenia) Elina Avanesyan
3. (Slovenia) Polona Hercog
4. (Japan) Sara Saito

=== Lucky loser ===
1. (France) Séléna Janicijevic

=== Qualifying draw ===
==== First qualifier ====
First round
1	(Germany) Caroline Werner	6	7^{7}
(Japan) Momoko Kobori	1	6^{2}
WC	(Spain) Carlota Corte	3	0
5	(Italy) Miriana Tona	6	6

Qualifying competition
1	(Germany) Caroline Werner	6	6
5	(Italy) Miriana Tona	3	1

==== Second qualifier ====
First round
2	(France) Séléna Janicijevic	6	6
WC	(Spain) Carlota Lujan Jecalo	1	3
Ekaterina Kazionova	4	3
7	(Armenia) Elina Avanesyan	6	6

Qualifying competition
2	(France) Séléna Janicijevic	0	2
7	(Armenia) Elina Avanesyan	6	6

==== Third qualifier ====
First round
3	(Slovenia) Polona Hercog	6	6
WC	(Spain) Yvonne Cavallé Reimers	4	2
(Ukraine) Nadiia Kolb	1	2
6	(Spain) Carlota Martínez Círez	6	6

Qualifying competition
3	(Slovenia) Polona Hercog	7	6
6	(Spain) Carlota Martínez Círez	5	2

==== Fourth qualifier ====
First round
4	(Japan) Sara Saito	6	6
WC	(Spain) Carmen López Martínez	1	2
(Germany) Mina Hodzic	6	3	5
8	(Spain) Cristina Díaz Adrover	3	6	7

Qualifying competition
4	(Japan) Sara Saito	6	6
8	(Spain) Cristina Díaz Adrover	1	1
