= 2024 Open Villa de Madrid – Singles =

Singles
- 2024 Open Villa de Madrid

Final
- Champion: (Japan) Moyuka Uchijima
- Runner-up: (Spain) Leyre Romero Gormaz
- Score: 5–7, 6–4, 7–5

Events
Singles	Doubles
← 2023 ·	Open Villa de Madrid	· 2025 →

Olga Danilović was the defending champion, but lost in the second round to Leyre Romero Gormaz.

Moyuka Uchijima won the title, after defeating Romero Gormaz in the final, 5–7, 6–4, 7–5.

== Seeds ==
1. (Spain) Jéssica Bouzas Maneiro (quarterfinals, retired)
2. (China) Bai Zhuoxuan (first round)
3. (Argentina) Julia Riera (first round)
4. (Hungary) Anna Bondár (quarterfinals)
5. (Spain) Rebeka Masarova (semifinals, retired)
6. (United States) Hailey Baptiste (first round)
7. (Japan) Moyuka Uchijima (champion)
8. (Serbia) Olga Danilović (second round)

== Draw ==
Key

- Q = Qualifier
- WC = Wild card
- LL = Lucky loser
- Alt = Alternate
- ITF = ITF entry
- PR = Protected ranking
- SR = Special ranking
- SE = Special exempt
- JE = Junior exempt
- JR = Junior Accelerator Programme entrant
- CO = College Accelerator Programme entrant
- NG = Next Gen Accelerator Program entrant
- w/o = Walkover
- r = Retired
- d = Defaulted

=== Finals ===
Semifinals
WC	(Spain) Leyre Romero Gormaz	3
5	(Spain) Rebeka Masarova	1^{r}
7	(Japan) Moyuka Uchijima	0	6	6
WC	(Andorra) Victoria Jiménez Kasintseva	6	0	4

Final
WC	(Spain) Leyre Romero Gormaz	7	4	5
7	(Japan) Moyuka Uchijima	5	6	7

=== Top half ===
First round
1	(Spain) J Bouzas Maneiro	5	6	6
Q	(Spain) A Lázaro García	7	2	4
WC	(Spain) I Burillo Escorihuela	1	4
(Argentina) S Sierra	6	6
WC	(Spain) L Romero Gormaz	6	6
Q	(Malta) F Curmi	3	3
Q	(United States) L Chirico	6	6^{4}	4
8	(Serbia) O Danilović	3	7^{7}	6
4	(Hungary) A Bondár	6	6
(Portugal) F Jorge	2	2
Q	(China) X You	7^{7}	6
Q	(Greece) D Papamichail	6^{4}	2
(United States) C Liu	4	4
WC	(Spain) G Maristany	6	6
SR	(United Kingdom) F Jones	3	6	6^{r}
5	(Spain) R Masarova	6	4	6

Second round
1	(Spain) J Bouzas Maneiro	6	3	6
(Argentina) S Sierra	3	6	1
WC	(Spain) L Romero Gormaz	6	6
8	(Serbia) O Danilović	3	2
4	(Hungary) A Bondár	6	6
Q	(China) X You	4	2
WC	(Spain) G Maristany	4	6^{2}
5	(Spain) R Masarova	6	7^{7}

Quarterfinals
1	(Spain) J Bouzas Maneiro	6	4	0^{r}
WC	(Spain) L Romero Gormaz	2	6	0
4	(Hungary) A Bondár	6^{4}	4
5	(Spain) R Masarova	7^{7}	6

Semifinals
WC	(Spain) L Romero Gormaz	3
5	(Spain) R Masarova	1^{r}

=== Bottom half ===
First round
7	(Japan) M Uchijima	7	6
(Spain) N Párrizas Díaz	5	2
(United States) R Montgomery	6	6
SR	(Belgium) A Van Uytvanck	4	1
Q	(France) A Hesse	2	3
(Japan) M Hontama	6	6
Q	(Romania) A Todoni	7	5	6
3	(Argentina) J Riera	5	7	3
6	(United States) H Baptiste	3	4
(Germany) E Lys	6	6
O Selekhmeteva	6	6
Q	E Yashina	2	2
(Romania) I Bara	6	7
(Australia) D Aiava	3	5
WC	(Andorra) V Jiménez Kasintseva	7	6
2	(China) Z Bai	5	4

Second round
7	(Japan) M Uchijima	6	6
(United States) R Montgomery	4	4
(Japan) M Hontama	3	6	3
Q	(Romania) A Todoni	6	3	6
(Germany) E Lys	4	0
O Selekhmeteva	6	6
(Romania) I Bara	2	1
WC	(Andorra) V Jiménez Kasintseva	6	6

Quarterfinals
7	(Japan) M Uchijima	6	1	6
Q	(Romania) A Todoni	2	6	2
O Selekhmeteva	6	6^{4}	6^{4}
WC	(Andorra) V Jiménez Kasintseva	3	7^{7}	7^{7}

Semifinals
7	(Japan) M Uchijima	0	6	6
WC	(Andorra) V Jiménez Kasintseva	6	0	4
