= 2025 Open Internacional Femení Solgironès =

- Date: 31 March–6 April 2025
- Edition: 9th
- Category: WTA 125
- Surface: Clay / Outdoor
- Location: La Bisbal d'Empordà, Spain
- Venue: Club Esportiu CT La Bisbal

Champions

Singles
- (Latvia) Darja Semeņistaja

Doubles
- (Belgium) Magali Kempen / (Czech Republic) Anna Sisková
- Torneig Internacional de Tennis Femení Solgironès

The 2025 Open Internacional Femení Solgironès was a professional women's tennis tournament played on outdoor clay courts. It was the ninth edition of the tournament and part of the 2025 WTA 125 tournaments. It took place at Club de Tennis La Bisbal Centre Esportiu in La Bisbal d'Empordà, Spain between 31 March and 6 April 2025.

== Singles entrants ==
=== Seeds ===
Country	Player	Rank^{1}	Seed
GER	Eva Lys	76	1
NED	Arantxa Rus	89	2
ARG	María Lourdes Carlé	97	3
UKR	Yuliia Starodubtseva	108	4
FRA	Diane Parry	109	5
~~GER~~	~~Jule Niemeier~~	~~114~~	~~6~~
	Aliaksandra Sasnovich	115	7
HUN	Panna Udvardy	143	8
AND	Victoria Jiménez Kasintseva	151	9

- ^{1} Rankings are as of 17 March 2025.

=== Other entrants ===
The following players received wildcards into the singles main draw:

- (Spain) Marina Bassols Ribera
- (Spain) Aliona Bolsova
- (Spain) Guiomar Maristany
- (Spain) Carlota Martínez Círez

The following players received entry from the qualifying draw:

- Alina Charaeva
- (Spain) Kaitlin Quevedo
- (France) Margaux Rouvroy
- (Germany) Caroline Werner

The following players received entry as a lucky loser:

- (Spain) Celia Cerviño Ruiz
- (Spain) Ángela Fita Boluda

=== Withdrawals ===
Before the tournament

- (Switzerland) Rebeka Masarova → replaced by (Spain) Celia Cerviño Ruiz
- (Germany) Jule Niemeier → replaced by (Spain) Ángela Fita Boluda

=== Retirements ===
During the tournament

- (France) Alizé Cornet (left thigh injury)
- (France) Margaux Rouvroy (right knee injury)

== Doubles entrants ==
=== Seeds ===
Country	Player	Country	Player	Rank^{1}	Seed
BEL	Magali Kempen	CZE	Anna Sisková	167	1
JPN	Nao Hibino	CHN	Tang Qianhui	178	2

- ^{1} Rankings as of 17 March 2025.

=== Other entrants ===
The following team received a wildcard into the doubles main draw:

- (Spain) Marina Bassols Ribera / (Spain) Guiomar Maristany

The following team received entry as alternates:

- (Latvia) Darja Semeņistaja / (Serbia) Nina Stojanović

=== Withdrawals ===
- (Netherlands) Arantxa Rus / (Hungary) Panna Udvardy → replaced by (Latvia) Darja Semeņistaja / (Serbia) Nina Stojanović

== Champions ==
=== Singles ===
- (Latvia) Darja Semeņistaja def. (Hungary) Dalma Gálfi 5–7, 6–0, 6–4

=== Doubles ===
- (Belgium) Magali Kempen / (Czech Republic) Anna Sisková def. (Latvia) Darja Semeņistaja / (Serbia) Nina Stojanović 7–6^{(7–1)}, 6–1
