= 2024 Open Villa de Madrid – Doubles =

Doubles
- 2024 Open Villa de Madrid

Final
- Champions: (Australia) Destanee Aiava (Greece) Eleni Christofi
- Runners-up: (Venezuela) Andrea Gámiz (Netherlands) Eva Vedder
- Score: 6–3, 2–6, [10–5]

Events
Singles	Doubles
← 2023 ·	Open Villa de Madrid	· 2025 →

Mai Hontama and Eri Hozumi were the defending champions but Hozumi chose not to participate. Hontama partnered alongside Katarzyna Piter, but withdrew from their quarterfinal match against Samantha Murray Sharan and Eden Silva.

Destanee Aiava and Eleni Christofi won the title, defeating Andrea Gámiz and Eva Vedder in the final; 6–3, 2–6, [10–5].

== Seeds ==
1. (Georgia (country)) Oksana Kalashnikova / (Belgium) Kimberley Zimmermann (semifinals)
2. Lidziya Marozava / Yana Sizikova (first round)
3. (United Kingdom) Maia Lumsden / (Greece) Despina Papamichail (quarterfinals)
4. Amina Anshba / (Czech Republic) Anastasia Dețiuc (first round)

== Draw ==
Key

- Q = Qualifier
- WC = Wild card
- LL = Lucky loser
- Alt = Alternate
- ITF = ITF entry
- PR = Protected ranking
- SR = Special ranking
- SE = Special exempt
- JE = Junior exempt
- JR = Junior Accelerator Programme entrant
- CO = College Accelerator Programme entrant
- NG = Next Gen Accelerator Program entrant
- w/o = Walkover
- r = Retired
- d = Defaulted

First round
1	(Georgia (country)) O Kalashnikova (Belgium) K Zimmermann	6	6
(Uzbekistan) N Abduraimova (Georgia (country)) N Dzalamidze	2	3
(United States) S Santamaria (Netherlands) B Schoofs	6	6
WC	(Spain) M de la Paz Alberto (Spain) C Gay	2	1
3	(United Kingdom) M Lumsden (Greece) D Papamichail	6	6
WC	(Spain) J Gómez (Spain) C Valle	1	1
(Australia) D Aiava (Greece) E Christofi	5	6	[10]
(Spain) Y Cavallé Reimers (Spain) N Párrizas Díaz	7	0	[5]
(Ukraine) M Kolb (Ukraine) N Kolb	4	4
(Japan) M Hontama (Poland) K Piter	6	6
(United Kingdom) S Murray Sharan (United Kingdom) E Silva	4	7	[10]
4	A Anshba (Czech Republic) A Dețiuc	6	5	[5]
WC	(Spain) B Berges (Spain) C Ramos Sierra	3	6	[8]
(China) Y Ma (India) V Shinde	6	4	[10]
(Venezuela) A Gámiz (Netherlands) E Vedder	6	6
2	L Marozava; Y Sizikova	4	2

Quarterfinals
1	(Georgia (country)) O Kalashnikova (Belgium) K Zimmermann	7^{7}	6
(United States) S Santamaria (Netherlands) B Schoofs	6^{4}	2
3	(United Kingdom) M Lumsden (Greece) D Papamichail	7	5	[7]
(Australia) D Aiava (Greece) E Christofi	5	7	[10]
(Japan) M Hontama (Poland) K Piter
(United Kingdom) S Murray Sharan (United Kingdom) E Silva	w/o
(China) Y Ma (India) V Shinde	0	3
(Venezuela) A Gámiz (Netherlands) E Vedder	6	6

Semifinals
1	(Georgia (country)) O Kalashnikova (Belgium) K Zimmermann	2	6	[8]
(Australia) D Aiava (Greece) E Christofi	6	2	[10]
(United Kingdom) S Murray Sharan (United Kingdom) E Silva	4	3
(Venezuela) A Gámiz (Netherlands) E Vedder	6	6

Final
(Australia) D Aiava (Greece) E Christofi	6	2	[10]
(Venezuela) A Gámiz (Netherlands) E Vedder	3	6	[5]
