= 2024 Canberra Tennis International – Women's doubles =

Women's doubles
- 2024 Canberra Tennis International

Final
- Champions: (Slovenia) Veronika Erjavec (Latvia) Darja Semeņistaja
- Runners-up: (Australia) Kaylah McPhee (Australia) Astra Sharma
- Score: 6–2, 6–4

Events
Singles	men	women
Doubles	men	women
← 2023 ·	Canberra Tennis International	· 2025 →

Irina Khromacheva and Anastasia Tikhonova were the defending champions, but chose to participate with different partners. Khromacheva partnered Nao Hibino but lost in the quarterfinals to Kaylah McPhee and Astra Sharma. Tikhonova partnered Elvina Kalieva but lost in the first round to Jodie Burrage and Jil Teichmann.

Veronika Erjavec and Darja Semeņistaja won the title, defeating McPhee and Sharma 6–2, 6–4 in the final.

== Seeds ==
1. (Japan) Nao Hibino / Irina Khromacheva (quarterfinals)
2. (United Kingdom) Harriet Dart / (Germany) Anna-Lena Friedsam (quarterfinals)
3. (United Kingdom) Jodie Burrage / (Switzerland) Jil Teichmann (quarterfinals, retired)
4. (Hungary) Anna Bondár / (Switzerland) Céline Naef (quarterfinals, withdrew)

== Draw ==
=== Key ===
- Q = Qualifier
- WC = Wild card
- LL = Lucky loser
- Alt = Alternate
- SE = Special exempt
- PR = Protected ranking
- ITF = ITF entry
- JE = Junior exempt
- w/o = Walkover
- r = Retired
- d = Defaulted
- SR = Special ranking

First round
1	(Japan) N Hibino; I Khromacheva	7^{8}	6
(United Kingdom) L Miyazaki (France) A Robbe	6^{6}	3
(Australia) Melisa Ercan (Australia) M Joint	6	6^{2}	[7]
(Australia) K McPhee (Australia) A Sharma	3	7^{7}	[10]
4	(Hungary) A Bondár (Switzerland) C Naef	w/o
(United States) E Mandlik (United States) K Volynets
(Italy) S Errani (Mexico) R Zarazúa	7	0	[6]
(Philippines) A Eala (Brazil) L Pigossi	5	6	[10]
(Slovenia) V Erjavec (Latvia) D Semeņistaja	w/o
(Colombia) E Arango (Ukraine) K Zavatska
(United States) E Kalieva; A Tikhonova	6^{4}	6^{5}
3	(United Kingdom) J Burrage (Switzerland) J Teichmann	7^{7}	7^{7}
(Australia) A Parnaby (Australia) I Popovic	6	6
(France) E Jacquemot (China) Y Wang	1	2
WC	(Australia) P Hule (Australia) TN Smith	4	4
2	(United Kingdom) H Dart (Germany) A-L Friedsam	6	6

Quarterfinals
1	(Japan) N Hibino; I Khromacheva	6	5	[5]
(Australia) K McPhee (Australia) A Sharma	2	7	[10]
4	(Hungary) A Bondár (Switzerland) C Naef
(Philippines) A Eala (Brazil) L Pigossi	w/o
(Slovenia) V Erjavec (Latvia) D Semeņistaja	3	2
3	(United Kingdom) J Burrage (Switzerland) J Teichmann	6	1^{r}
(Australia) A Parnaby (Australia) I Popovic	7^{7}	1	[10]
2	(United Kingdom) H Dart (Germany) A-L Friedsam	6^{4}	6	[3]

Semifinals
(Australia) K McPhee (Australia) A Sharma	7^{7}	6
(Philippines) A Eala (Brazil) L Pigossi	6^{1}	3
(Slovenia) V Erjavec (Latvia) D Semeņistaja	7	7^{7}
(Australia) A Parnaby (Australia) I Popovic	5	6^{5}

Final
(Australia) K McPhee (Australia) A Sharma	2	4
(Slovenia) V Erjavec (Latvia) D Semeņistaja	6	6
