= 2025 Canberra Tennis International =

- Date: 30 December 2024–4 January 2025
- Edition: 7th (men); 8th (women)
- Category: ATP Challenger 125; WTA 125
- Draw: 32S/16D
- Prize money: $200,000
- Surface: Hard
- Location: Canberra, Australia

Champions

Men's singles
- (Brazil) João Fonseca

Women's singles
- (Japan) Aoi Ito

Men's doubles
- (United States) Ryan Seggerman / (United States) Eliot Spizzirri

Women's doubles
- (Australia) Jaimee Fourlis / (Australia) Petra Hule
- Canberra Tennis International

The 2025 Workday Canberra International was a professional tennis tournament played on outdoor hardcourts. It was the seventh edition of the men's tournament, which was part of the 2025 ATP Challenger 125, and the eighth edition of the women's tournament, which was part of the 2025 WTA 125 tournaments. It took place at the Canberra Tennis Centre in Canberra, Australia between 30 December 2024 and 4 January 2025.

== Champions ==
=== Men's singles ===
- (Brazil) João Fonseca def. (United States) Ethan Quinn 6–4, 6–4.

=== Women's singles ===
- (Japan) Aoi Ito def. (China) Wei Sijia 6–4, 6–3.

=== Men's doubles ===
- (United States) Ryan Seggerman / (United States) Eliot Spizzirri def. (France) Pierre-Hugues Herbert / (Switzerland) Jérôme Kym 1–6, 7–5, [10–5].

=== Women's doubles ===
- (Australia) Jaimee Fourlis / (Australia) Petra Hule def. (Latvia) Darja Semeņistaja / (Serbia) Nina Stojanović 7–5, 4–6, [10–6].

== Men's singles main draw entrants ==
=== Seeds ===
Country	Player	Rank^{1}	Seed
FRA	Hugo Gaston	76	1
ARG	Facundo Díaz Acosta	79	2
BIH	Damir Džumhur	83	3
JPN	Taro Daniel	84	4
IND	Sumit Nagal	98	5
GBR	Jacob Fearnley	99	6
GER	Dominik Koepfer	102	7
ITA	Mattia Bellucci	103	8

- ^{1} Rankings as of 23 December 2024

=== Other entrants ===
The following players received a wildcard into the singles main draw:

- (Australia) Matthew Dellavedova
- (Australia) Blake Ellis
- (Australia) Dane Sweeny

The following player received entry into the singles main draw using a protected ranking:

- (Japan) Yosuke Watanuki

The following player received entry into the singles main draw as an alternate:

- (United States) Mitchell Krueger

The following players received entry from the qualifying draw:

- (Canada) Alexis Galarneau
- (Lebanon) Hady Habib
- (Poland) ~~Maks Kaśnikowski~~
- (United States) Patrick Kypson
- (United States) Ethan Quinn
- (Japan) James Trotter

The following player received entry as a lucky loser:

- (Argentina) Román Andrés Burruchaga

== Women's singles main draw entrants ==
=== Seeds ===
Country	Player	Rank^{1}	Seed
ESP	Nuria Párrizas Díaz	91	1
HUN	Anna Bondár	93	2
	Anastasia Zakharova	112	3
LAT	Darja Semeņistaja	119	4
CRO	Petra Martić	122	5
CAN	Marina Stakusic	125	6
JPN	Aoi Ito	126	7
THA	Mananchaya Sawangkaew	130	8

- ^{1} Rankings as of 23 December 2024.

=== Other entrants ===
The following players received a wildcard into the singles main draw:

- (Australia) Lizette Cabrera
- (Australia) Petra Hule
- (Australia) Emerson Jones
- (Australia) Taylah Preston

The following players received entry using a protected ranking:

- (Montenegro) Danka Kovinić
- (Serbia) Nina Stojanović

The following players received entry from the qualifying draw:

- (Philippines) Alexandra Eala
- (France) Elsa Jacquemot
- (Austria) Sinja Kraus
- (Turkey) İpek Öz
- (Japan) Sara Saito
- Oksana Selekhmeteva
- (Argentina) Solana Sierra
- (Switzerland) Simona Waltert

== Women's doubles main-draw entrants ==
=== Seeds ===
Country	Player	Country	Player	Rank^{1}	Seed
HUN	Anna Bondár	SLO	Tamara Zidanšek		1
SLO	Veronika Erjavec	CZE	Dominika Šalková		2
LAT	Darja Semeņistaja	SRB	Nina Stojanović		3
AUS	Jaimee Fourlis	AUS	Petra Hule		4

- ^{1} Rankings are as of 23 December 2024.

=== Other entrants ===
The following pair received a wildcard into the doubles main draw:

- (Australia) Lizette Cabrera / (Australia) Taylah Preston
