= 2024 Canberra Tennis International =

- Date: 1–6 January
- Edition: 6th (men); 7th (women)
- Category: ATP Challenger 125; WTA 125
- Draw: 32S/16D
- Prize money: $164,000
- Surface: Hard
- Location: Canberra, Australia

Champions

Men's singles
- (Germany) Dominik Koepfer

Women's singles
- (Spain) Nuria Párrizas Díaz

Men's doubles
- (Spain) Daniel Rincón / (Jordan) Abdullah Shelbayh

Women's doubles
- (Slovenia) Veronika Erjavec / (Latvia) Darja Semeņistaja
- Canberra Tennis International

The 2024 Workday Canberra International was a professional tennis tournament played on outdoor hardcourts. It was the sixth edition of the tournament and was part of the 2024 ATP Challenger Tour. It was its first season as an ATP Challenger Tour 125 event. On the women's side, it was the seventh edition of the event and is part of the 2024 WTA 125 tournaments. It took place at the Canberra Tennis Centre in Canberra, Australia between 1 and 6 January 2024.

== Men's singles main draw entrants ==
=== Seeds ===
Country	Player	Rank^{1}	Seed
GER	Dominik Koepfer	77	1
FRA	Alexandre Müller	81	2
ARG	Facundo Díaz Acosta	95	3
FRA	Arthur Rinderknech	96	4
USA	Michael Mmoh	105	5
BEL	David Goffin	111	6
ITA	Luca Nardi	118	7
SVK	Alex Molčan	119	8

- ^{1} Rankings as of 25 December 2023.

=== Other entrants ===
The following players received a wildcard into the singles main draw:

- (Australia) Pavle Marinkov
- (Australia) Tristan Schoolkate
- (Australia) Adam Walton

The following player received entry into the singles main draw using a protected ranking:

- (Czech Republic) Jiří Veselý

The following players received entry from the qualifying draw:

- (Italy) Matteo Gigante
- (Australia) Casey Hoole
- (Germany) Rudolf Molleker
- (Switzerland) Alexander Ritschard
- (Italy) Andrea Vavassori
- (Kazakhstan) Denis Yevseyev

== Women's singles main draw entrants ==
=== Seeds ===
Country	Player	Rank^{1}	Seed
SUI	Viktorija Golubic	83	1
JPN	Nao Hibino	94	2
FRA	Océane Dodin	96	3
GBR	Jodie Burrage	97	4
	Kamilla Rakhimova	99	5
CHN	Wang Yafan	100	6
MEX	Renata Zarazúa	104	7
ITA	Sara Errani	105	8

- ^{1} Rankings as of 25 December 2023.

=== Other entrants ===
The following players received a wildcard into the singles main draw:

- (Australia) Melisa Ercan
- (Australia) Maya Joint
- (Australia) Emerson Jones
- (Australia) Taylah Preston

The following players received entry from the qualifying draw:

- (France) Fiona Ferro
- (Canada) Rebecca Marino
- (Australia) Kaylah McPhee
- (Switzerland) Céline Naef
- (Sweden) Rebecca Peterson
- (Canada) Katherine Sebov
- (Germany) Ella Seidel
- (Ukraine) Daria Snigur

== Women's doubles main-draw entrants ==
=== Seeds ===
Country	Player	Country	Player	Rank^{1}	Seed
JPN	Nao Hibino		Irina Khromacheva	216	1
GBR	Harriet Dart	GER	Anna-Lena Friedsam	277	2
GBR	Jodie Burrage	SUI	Jil Teichmann	294	3
HUN	Anna Bondár	SUI	Céline Naef	316	4

- ^{1} Rankings are as of 25 December 2023.

=== Other entrants ===
The following team received a wildcard into the doubles main draw:

- (Australia) Petra Hule / (Australia) Tina Nadine Smith

== Champions ==
=== Men's singles ===
- (Germany) Dominik Koepfer def. (Czech Republic) Jakub Menšík 6–3, 6–2.

=== Women's singles ===
- (Spain) Nuria Párrizas Díaz def. (United Kingdom) Harriet Dart 6–4, 6–3

=== Men's doubles ===
- (Spain) Daniel Rincón / (Jordan) Abdullah Shelbayh def. (Sweden) André Göransson / (France) Albano Olivetti 7–6^{(7–4)}, 6–3.

=== Women's doubles ===
- (Slovenia) Veronika Erjavec / (Latvia) Darja Semeņistaja def. (Australia) Kaylah McPhee / (Australia) Astra Sharma 6–2, 6–4
