= 2025 Open Internacional Femení Solgironès – Doubles =

Doubles
- 2025 Open Internacional Femení Solgironès

Final
- Champions: (Belgium) Magali Kempen (Czech Republic) Anna Sisková
- Runners-up: (Latvia) Darja Semeņistaja (Serbia) Nina Stojanović
- Score: 7–6^{(7–1)}, 6–1

Events
Singles	Doubles
- Torneig Internacional de Tennis Femení Solgironès

Miriam Škoch and Anna Sisková were the reigning champions, but Škoch chose to compete in Antalya instead.

Sisková partnered Magali Kempen and successfully defended her title, defeating Darja Semeņistaja and Nina Stojanović in the final, 7–6^{(7–1)}, 6–1.

== Seeds ==
1. (Belgium) Magali Kempen / (Czech Republic) Anna Sisková (champions)
2. (Japan) Nao Hibino / (China) Tang Qianhui (quarterfinals)

== Draw ==
Key

- Q = Qualifier
- WC = Wild card
- LL = Lucky loser
- Alt = Alternate
- ITF = ITF entry
- PR = Protected ranking
- SR = Special ranking
- SE = Special exempt
- JE = Junior exempt
- JR = Junior Accelerator Programme entrant
- CO = College Accelerator Programme entrant
- NG = Next Gen Accelerator Program entrant
- w/o = Walkover
- r = Retired
- d = Defaulted

=== Draw ===
Quarterfinals
1	(Belgium) M Kempen (Czech Republic) A Sisková	6	6
WC	(Spain) M Bassols Ribera (Spain) G Maristany	2	0
(Spain) A Bolsova (Spain) Y Cavallé Reimers	6	6
(United Kingdom) E Silva (Belgium) K Zimmermann	2	4
Alt	(Latvia) D Semeņistaja (Serbia) N Stojanović	6	6
(France) E Cascino (Belgium) L Salden	4	4
(Netherlands) I Haverlag (Poland) A Rosolska	4	6	[10]
2	(Japan) N Hibino (China) Q Tang	6	2	[5]

Semifinals
1	(Belgium) M Kempen (Czech Republic) A Sisková	6	7
(Spain) A Bolsova (Spain) Y Cavallé Reimers	3	5
Alt	(Latvia) D Semeņistaja (Serbia) N Stojanović	4	6	[12]
(Netherlands) I Haverlag (Poland) A Rosolska	6	4	[10]

Final
1	(Belgium) M Kempen (Czech Republic) A Sisková	7^{7}	6
Alt	(Latvia) D Semeņistaja (Serbia) N Stojanović	6^{1}	1
