= 2023 Open Villa de Madrid – Doubles =

Doubles
- 2023 Open Villa de Madrid

Final
- Champions: (Japan) Mai Hontama (Japan) Eri Hozumi
- Runners-up: (Greece) Eleni Christofi (Greece) Despina Papamichail
- Score: 6–0, 7–5

Events
Singles	Doubles
← 2022 ·	Open Villa de Madrid	· 2024 →

Aliona Bolsova and Rebeka Masarova were the defending champions but chose not to participate.

Mai Hontama and Eri Hozumi won the title, defeating Eleni Christofi and Despina Papamichail in the final, 6–0, 7–5.

== Seeds ==
1. (Georgia (country)) Oksana Kalashnikova / (Poland) Katarzyna Piter (semifinals)
2. (United Kingdom) Emily Appleton / (Netherlands) Bibiane Schoofs (first round)
3. (Japan) Mai Hontama / (Japan) Eri Hozumi (champions)
4. (Venezuela) Andrea Gámiz / (Spain) Andrea Lázaro García (quarterfinals)

== Draw ==
=== Key ===
- Q = Qualifier
- WC = Wild card
- LL = Lucky loser
- Alt = Alternate
- SE = Special exempt
- PR = Protected ranking
- ITF = ITF entry
- JE = Junior exempt
- w/o = Walkover
- r = Retired
- d = Defaulted
- SR = Special ranking

First round
1	(Georgia (country)) O Kalashnikova (Poland) K Piter	6	6
(Switzerland) C Perrin (India) P Thombare	3	3
WC	(Spain) M Idiakez (Spain) L Tapiador	4	1
WC	(Spain) MdlP Alberto (Spain) C Gay	6	6
4	(Venezuela) A Gámiz (Spain) A Lázaro García	6	6
(Spain) M Benito (Spain) M Soriano Santiago	2	0
(Spain) L Cortez Llorca (India) V Shinde	3	1
(Greece) E Christofi (Greece) D Papamichail	6	6
(Spain) C Rodríguez Dueñas (Spain) O Sáez Larra	3	7	[10]
(Spain) J Bouzas Maneiro (Spain) L Romero Gormaz	6	5	[2]
(Italy) C Girelli (Italy) M Tona	2	2
3	(Japan) M Hontama (Japan) E Hozumi	6	6
(Spain) M Bassols Ribera (Serbia) O Danilović
(Denmark) O Gram; T Prozorova	w/o
(Spain) Á Fita Boluda (Netherlands) A Rus	6	6
2	(United Kingdom) E Appleton (Netherlands) B Schoofs	4	4

Quarterfinals
1	(Georgia (country)) O Kalashnikova (Poland) K Piter	6	6
WC	(Spain) MdlP Alberto (Spain) C Gay	1	0
4	(Venezuela) A Gámiz (Spain) A Lázaro García	1	5
(Greece) E Christofi (Greece) D Papamichail	6	7
(Spain) C Rodríguez Dueñas (Spain) O Sáez Larra	0	1
3	(Japan) M Hontama (Japan) E Hozumi	6	6
(Denmark) O Gram; T Prozorova	1	1
(Spain) Á Fita Boluda (Netherlands) A Rus	6	6

Semifinals
1	(Georgia (country)) O Kalashnikova (Poland) K Piter	6	4	[8]
(Greece) E Christofi (Greece) D Papamichail	4	6	[10]
3	(Japan) M Hontama (Japan) E Hozumi	w/o
(Spain) Á Fita Boluda (Netherlands) A Rus

Final
(Greece) E Christofi (Greece) D Papamichail	0	5
3	(Japan) M Hontama (Japan) E Hozumi	6	7
