= 2024 Canberra Tennis International – Men's doubles =

Men's doubles
- 2024 Canberra Tennis International

Final
- Champions: (Spain) Daniel Rincón (Jordan) Abdullah Shelbayh
- Runners-up: (Sweden) André Göransson (France) Albano Olivetti
- Score: 7–6^{(7–4)}, 6–3

Events
Singles	men	women
Doubles	men	women
← 2023 ·	Canberra Tennis International	· 2025 →

André Göransson and Ben McLachlan were the defending champions but only Göransson chose to defend his title, partnering Albano Olivetti.

Daniel Rincón and Abdullah Shelbayh won the title after defeating Göransson and Olivetti 7–6^{(7–4)}, 6–3 in the final.

== Seeds ==
1. (Sweden) André Göransson / (France) Albano Olivetti (final)
2. (Brazil) Marcelo Demoliner / (Netherlands) Bart Stevens (quarterfinals)
3. (Ecuador) Diego Hidalgo / (Colombia) Cristian Rodríguez (semifinals)
4. (India) Anirudh Chandrasekar / (India) Vijay Sundar Prashanth (first round)

== Draw ==
=== Key ===
- Q = Qualifier
- WC = Wild card
- LL = Lucky loser
- Alt = Alternate
- SE = Special exempt
- PR = Protected ranking
- ITF = ITF entry
- JE = Junior exempt
- w/o = Walkover
- r = Retired
- d = Defaulted
- SR = Special ranking

First round
1	(Sweden) A Göransson (France) A Olivetti	7^{7}	6
(Germany) B Hassan (Germany) R Molleker	6^{3}	1
WC	(Australia) P Harper (Australia) E Winter	6^{7}	6	[10]
(Italy) F Maestrelli (Italy) A Vavassori	7^{9}	4	[2]
4	(India) A Chandrasekar (India) VS Prashanth	6	4	[8]
(Australia) A Harris (Australia) MC Romios	4	6	[10]
(Canada) G Diallo (United States) E Nava	4	6	[10]
(Belgium) D Goffin (France) A Müller	6	3	[8]
(Kazakhstan) T Skatov (Kazakhstan) D Yevseyev	3	7^{7}	[10]
(Australia) A Bolt (Australia) L Saville	6	6^{3}	[7]
WC	(Australia) Thomas Nicholas Gadecki (Australia) Hugh Winter	1	4
3	(Ecuador) D Hidalgo (Colombia) C Rodríguez	6	6
(Spain) D Rincón (Jordan) A Shelbayh	3	6	[10]
(Australia) T Schoolkate (Australia) A Walton	6	3	[5]
(South Africa) L Harris (India) S Nagal	1	3
2	(Brazil) M Demoliner (Netherlands) B Stevens	6	6

Quarterfinals
1	(Sweden) A Göransson (France) A Olivetti	7	6
WC	(Australia) P Harper (Australia) E Winter	5	2
(Australia) A Harris (Australia) MC Romios	6^{6}	4
(Canada) G Diallo (United States) E Nava	7^{8}	6
(Kazakhstan) T Skatov (Kazakhstan) D Yevseyev
3	(Ecuador) D Hidalgo (Colombia) C Rodríguez	w/o
(Spain) D Rincón (Jordan) A Shelbayh	6	6
2	(Brazil) M Demoliner (Netherlands) B Stevens	4	4

Semifinals
1	(Sweden) A Göransson (France) A Olivetti	6	6
(Canada) G Diallo (United States) E Nava	3	4
3	(Ecuador) D Hidalgo (Colombia) C Rodríguez	7	6^{1}	[10]
(Spain) D Rincón (Jordan) A Shelbayh	5	7^{7}	[12]

Final
1	(Sweden) A Göransson (France) A Olivetti	6^{4}	3
(Spain) D Rincón (Jordan) A Shelbayh	7^{7}	6
