= 2026 Open Villa de Madrid – Doubles =

Doubles
- 2026 Open Villa de Madrid

Final
- Champion: (Spain) Irene Burillo; Elena Pridankina
- Runner-up: (Romania) Irina Bara (Latvia) Darja Semeņistaja
- Score: 4–6, 6–3, [10–3]

Details
- Draw: 16
- Seeds: 4

Events
Singles	Doubles
- Open Villa de Madrid

Nicole Fossa Huergo and Zhibek Kulambayeva were the defending champions when this was an ITF W100 event, but chose not to compete this year.

Irene Burillo and Elena Pridankina won the title, defeating Irina Bara and Darja Semeņistaja 4–6, 6–3, [10–3] in the final.

== Seeds ==
1. (Spain) Irene Burillo / Elena Pridankina (champions)
2. (United Kingdom) Madeleine Brooks / (United States) Ivana Corley (quarterfinals)
3. (Chinese Taipei) Cho I-hsuan / (Chinese Taipei) Cho Yi-tsen (semifinals)
4. (France) Estelle Cascino / (Switzerland) Naïma Karamoko (first round)

== Draw ==
Key

- Q = Qualifier
- WC = Wild card
- LL = Lucky loser
- Alt = Alternate
- ITF = ITF entry
- PR = Protected ranking
- SR = Special ranking
- SE = Special exempt
- JE = Junior exempt
- JR = Junior Accelerator Programme entrant
- CO = College Accelerator Programme entrant
- NG = Next Gen Accelerator Program entrant
- w/o = Walkover
- r = Retired
- d = Defaulted

=== Draw ===
First round
1	(Spain) I Burillo; E Pridankina	6	6
(Croatia) M Dražić (Ukraine) N Kolb	4	1
Alt	(Italy) N Brancaccio (Italy) L Pigato	1	4
(Spain) Y Cavallé Reimers (United States) CYS Lee	6	6
(Brazil) I Martins (Czech Republic) L Samson	6	0	[4]
O Selekhmeteva (Switzerland) S Waltert	3	6	[10]
WC	(Spain) C Gallardo Guevara (Spain) M García Cid	2	4
(Romania) I Bara (Latvia) D Semeņistaja	6	6
(United Kingdom) A Barnett (Czech Republic) I Šebestová	6	6
4	(France) E Cascino (Switzerland) N Karamoko	1	2
(Japan) M Kobori (Japan) S Saito	2	6	[10]
(Spain) M Bassols Ribera (Spain) A Lázaro García	6	3	[12]
(United States) R Montgomery (United States) W Osuigwe	3	6^{4}
2	(United Kingdom) M Brooks (United States) I Corley	6	7^{7}

Quarterfinals
1	(Spain) I Burillo; E Pridankina	6	6
(Spain) Y Cavallé Reimers (United States) CYS Lee	1	3
3	(Chinese Taipei) I-h Cho (Chinese Taipei) Y-t Cho	7	6
O Selekhmeteva (Switzerland) S Waltert	5	3
(Romania) I Bara (Latvia) D Semeņistaja	6	7
(United Kingdom) A Barnett (Czech Republic) I Šebestová	4	5
(Spain) M Bassols Ribera (Spain) A Lázaro García	3	6	[10]
2	(United Kingdom) M Brooks (United States) I Corley	6	3	[6]

Semifinals
1	(Spain) I Burillo; E Pridankina	6	6^{6}	[10]
3	(Chinese Taipei) I-h Cho (Chinese Taipei) Y-t Cho	2	7^{8}	[6]
(Romania) I Bara (Latvia) D Semeņistaja	6^{6}	6	[10]
(Spain) M Bassols Ribera (Spain) A Lázaro García	7^{8}	4	[4]

Final
1	(Spain) I Burillo; E Pridankina	4	6	[10]
(Romania) I Bara (Latvia) D Semeņistaja	6	3	[3]
