= 2024 Open Villa de Madrid =

Tennis tournament

- Date: 13–19 May 2024
- Edition: 3rd
- Category: ITF Women's World Tennis Tour
- Prize money: $100,000
- Surface: Clay / Outdoor
- Location: Madrid, Spain

Champions

Singles
- (Japan) Moyuka Uchijima

Doubles
- (Australia) Destanee Aiava / (Greece) Eleni Christofi
- Open Villa de Madrid

The 2024 Open Villa de Madrid was a professional tennis tournament play on outdoor clay courts. It was the third edition of the tournament, which was part of the 2024 ITF Women's World Tennis Tour. It took place in Madrid, Spain, between 13 and 19 May 2024.

== Champions ==
=== Singles ===
- (Japan) Moyuka Uchijima def. (Spain) Leyre Romero Gormaz, 5–7, 6–4, 7–5

=== Doubles ===
- (Australia) Destanee Aiava / (Greece) Eleni Christofi def. (Venezuela) Andrea Gámiz / (Netherlands) Eva Vedder, 6–3, 2–6, [10–5].

== Singles main draw entrants ==
=== Seeds ===
Country	Player	Rank	Seed
ESP	Jéssica Bouzas Maneiro	89	1
CHN	Bai Zhuoxuan	90	2
ARG	Julia Riera	94	3
HUN	Anna Bondár	95	4
ESP	Rebeka Masarova	104	5
USA	Hailey Baptiste	106	6
JPN	Moyuka Uchijima	110	7
SRB	Olga Danilović	112	8

- Rankings are as of 6 May 2024.

=== Other entrants ===
The following players received wildcards into the singles main draw:

- (Spain) Irene Burillo Escorihuela
- (Andorra) Victoria Jiménez Kasintseva
- (Spain) Guiomar Maristany
- (Spain) Leyre Romero Gormaz

The following player received entry into the singles main draw using a special ranking:

- (United Kingdom) Francesca Jones
- (Belgium) Alison Van Uytvanck

The following players received entry from the qualifying draw:

- (United States) Louisa Chirico
- (Malta) Francesca Curmi
- (France) Amandine Hesse
- (Spain) Andrea Lázaro García
- (Greece) Despina Papamichail
- (Romania) Anca Todoni
- Ekaterina Yashina
- (China) You Xiaodi
