= 2023 Open Villa de Madrid – Singles =

Singles
- 2023 Open Villa de Madrid

Final
- Champion: (Serbia) Olga Danilović
- Runner-up: (Spain) Sara Sorribes Tormo
- Score: 6–2, 6–3

Events
Singles	Doubles
← 2022 ·	Open Villa de Madrid	· 2024 →

Aliona Bolsova was the defending champion but chose not to participate.

Olga Danilović won the title, defeating Sara Sorribes Tormo in the final, 6–2, 6–3.

== Seeds ==
1. (Canada) Leylah Fernandez (semifinals)
2. (United States) Emma Navarro (first round)
3. (Hungary) Dalma Gálfi (second round, retired)
4. (Argentina) Nadia Podoroska (first round)
5. (Netherlands) Arantxa Rus (quarterfinals, withdrew)
6. (Australia) Kimberly Birrell (first round)
7. (Switzerland) Simona Waltert (second round)
8. (Spain) Marina Bassols Ribera (first round)

== Draw ==
=== Key ===
- Q = Qualifier
- WC = Wild card
- LL = Lucky loser
- Alt = Alternate
- SE = Special exempt
- PR = Protected ranking
- ITF = ITF entry
- JE = Junior exempt
- w/o = Walkover
- r = Retired
- d = Defaulted
- SR = Special ranking

=== Finals ===
Semifinals
1/WC	(Canada) Leylah Fernandez	2	5
(Spain) Sara Sorribes Tormo	6	7
Q	(Netherlands) Suzan Lamens	4	1
(Serbia) Olga Danilović	6	6

Final
(Spain) Sara Sorribes Tormo	2	3
(Serbia) Olga Danilović	6	6

=== Top half ===
First round
1/WC	(Canada) L Fernandez	6	6
Q	(Switzerland) C Perrin	0	2
(Colombia) E Arango	6	6
(Australia) J Fourlis	2	2
(Spain) L Romero Gormaz	4	2
Q	(Spain) L Cortez Llorca	6	6
(Spain) J Bouzas Maneiro	2	2
5	(Netherlands) A Rus	6	6
4	(Argentina) N Podoroska	1	4
(Romania) J Cristian	6	6
(Japan) M Hontama	6	6
(Greece) D Papamichail	4	1
WC	(Spain) Á Fita Boluda	2	1
(Spain) S Sorribes Tormo	6	6
(Japan) M Uchijima	6	6
6	(Australia) K Birrell	2	1

Second round
1/WC	(Canada) L Fernandez	4	6	7^{7}
(Colombia) E Arango	6	2	6^{5}
Q	(Spain) L Cortez Llorca	1	3
5	(Netherlands) A Rus	6	6
(Romania) J Cristian	6	6
(Japan) M Hontama	1	0
(Spain) S Sorribes Tormo	6	6
(Japan) M Uchijima	4	1

Quarterfinals
1/WC	(Canada) L Fernandez	w/o
5	(Netherlands) A Rus
(Romania) J Cristian	3	7^{7}	2
(Spain) S Sorribes Tormo	6	6^{3}	6

Semifinals
1/WC	(Canada) L Fernandez	2	5
(Spain) S Sorribes Tormo	6	7

=== Bottom half ===
First round
7	(Switzerland) S Waltert	6	6
(Argentina) P Ormaechea	0	2
Q	T Prozorova	1	2
Q	(Spain) A Lázaro García	6	6
Q	(Italy) M Tona	0	0
Q	(Netherlands) S Lamens	6	6
(Australia) Ar Rodionova	1	6	2
3	(Hungary) D Gálfi	6	1	6
8	(Spain) M Bassols Ribera	2	0
(Serbia) O Danilović	6	6
Q	(Spain) L Moreno Arias	2	0
WC	(Spain) I Burillo Escorihuela	6	6
Q	(Ukraine) K Zavatska	3	6	6
WC	(Spain) M Soriano Santiago	6	2	2
(Denmark) C Tauson	6	6
2	(United States) E Navarro	2	4

Second round
7	(Switzerland) S Waltert	0	7	3
Q	(Spain) A Lázaro García	6	5	6
Q	(Netherlands) S Lamens	5
3	(Hungary) D Gálfi	1^{r}
(Serbia) O Danilović	6	6
WC	(Spain) I Burillo Escorihuela	0	0
Q	(Ukraine) K Zavatska	0	7^{10}	6
(Denmark) C Tauson	6	6^{8}	1

Quarterfinals
Q	(Spain) A Lázaro García	6	3	3
Q	(Netherlands) S Lamens	4	6	6
(Serbia) O Danilović	6	6
Q	(Ukraine) K Zavatska	2	4

Semifinals
Q	(Netherlands) S Lamens	4	1
(Serbia) O Danilović	6	6
