= 2022 Open Villa de Madrid – Doubles =

Doubles
- 2022 Open Villa de Madrid

Final
- Champions: (Spain) Aliona Bolsova (Spain) Rebeka Masarova
- Runners-up: (Croatia) Lea Bošković (Latvia) Daniela Vismane
- Score: 6–3, 6–3

Events
Singles	Doubles
Open Villa de Madrid	· 2023 →

This was the first edition of the tournament.

Aliona Bolsova and Rebeka Masarova won the title, defeating Lea Bošković and Daniela Vismane in the final, 6–3, 6–3.

== Seeds ==
1. (Spain) Aliona Bolsova / (Spain) Rebeka Masarova (champions)
2. (Slovenia) Veronika Erjavec / (United Kingdom) Emily Webley-Smith (first round)
3. (Italy) Angelica Moratelli / (Italy) Camilla Rosatello (quarterfinals)
4. Alena Fomina-Klotz / (Slovenia) Nika Radišić (quarterfinals)

== Draw ==
=== Key ===
- Q = Qualifier
- WC = Wild card
- LL = Lucky loser
- Alt = Alternate
- SE = Special exempt
- PR = Protected ranking
- ITF = ITF entry
- JE = Junior exempt
- w/o = Walkover
- r = Retired
- d = Defaulted
- SR = Special ranking

=== Draw ===
First round
1	(Spain) A Bolsova (Spain) R Masarova	6	6
(Italy) N Brancaccio (Malta) F Curmi	3	2
(Spain) J Bouzas Maneiro (Spain) L Romero Gormaz	w/o
(Spain) L Cortez Llorca (France) L Nguyen Tan
3	(Italy) A Moratelli (Italy) C Rosatello	6	6
(Romania) IG Ghioroaie (Bosnia and Herzegovina) A Wagner	4	1
(Spain) M Bassols Ribera (Spain) O Parres Azcoitia	7^{7}	5	[10]
(Netherlands) I Haverlag (Netherlands) S Lamens	6^{4}	7	[7]
(Croatia) L Bošković (Latvia) D Vismane	4	7^{7}	[10]
(Spain) I Burillo Escorihuela (Spain) A Lázaro García	6	6^{5}	[4]
(Switzerland) Y In-Albon (Greece) D Papamichail	6	3	[7]
4	A Fomina-Klotz (Slovenia) N Radišić	4	6	[10]
(Spain) M Benito (Spain) M González Encinas	1	1
(Belgium) M Benoît (Romania) A Prisăcariu	6	6
I Khromacheva; I Shymanovich	6	6
2	(Slovenia) V Erjavec (United Kingdom) E Webley-Smith	1	2

Quarterfinals
1	(Spain) A Bolsova (Spain) R Masarova	6	2	[11]
(Spain) J Bouzas Maneiro (Spain) L Romero Gormaz	0	6	[9]
3	(Italy) A Moratelli (Italy) C Rosatello	6^{3}	7	[9]
(Spain) M Bassols Ribera (Spain) O Parres Azcoitia	7^{7}	5	[11]
(Croatia) L Bošković (Latvia) D Vismane	6	6
4	A Fomina-Klotz (Slovenia) N Radišić	4	2
(Belgium) M Benoît (Romania) A Prisăcariu	1	2
I Khromacheva; I Shymanovich	6	6

Semifinals
1	(Spain) A Bolsova (Spain) R Masarova	6	6
(Spain) M Bassols Ribera (Spain) O Parres Azcoitia	3	1
(Croatia) L Bošković (Latvia) D Vismane	7	6
I Khromacheva; I Shymanovich	5	4

Final
1	(Spain) A Bolsova (Spain) R Masarova	6	6
(Croatia) L Bošković (Latvia) D Vismane	3	3
