= 2025 Canberra Tennis International – Men's doubles =

Men's doubles
- 2025 Canberra Tennis International

Final
- Champions: (United States) Ryan Seggerman (United States) Eliot Spizzirri
- Runners-up: (France) Pierre-Hugues Herbert (Switzerland) Jérôme Kym
- Score: 1–6, 7–5, [10–5]

Events
| Singles | men | women |
| Doubles | men | women |
| ← 2024 · | Canberra Tennis International | · 2026 → |

Daniel Rincón and Abdullah Shelbayh were the defending champions but chose not to defend their title.

Ryan Seggerman and Eliot Spizzirri won the title after defeating Pierre-Hugues Herbert and Jérôme Kym 1–6, 7–5, [10–5] in the final.

== Seeds ==
1. (Sweden) André Göransson / (Netherlands) Sem Verbeek (first round)
2. (Australia) Matthew Romios / (United States) Reese Stalder (first round)
3. (Australia) Blake Ellis / (Australia) Thomas Fancutt (first round)
4. (United States) Christopher Eubanks / (United States) Mackenzie McDonald (first round)

== Draw ==
=== Key ===
- Q = Qualifier
- WC = Wild card
- LL = Lucky loser
- Alt = Alternate
- SE = Special exempt
- PR = Protected ranking
- ITF = ITF entry
- JE = Junior exempt
- w/o = Walkover
- r = Retired
- d = Defaulted
- SR = Special ranking

=== Draw ===
First round
1 | (Sweden) A Göransson (Netherlands) S Verbeek | 7^{7} | 6^{7} | [7]
(United States) A Kovacevic (United States) M Krueger | 6^{4} | 7^{9} | [10]
(Japan) Y Shimizu (Japan) J Trotter | 7^{7} | 4 | [8]
(United Kingdom) J Fearnley (Australia) P Harper | 6^{4} | 6 | [10]
3 | (Australia) B Ellis (Australia) T Fancutt | 3 | 6 | [7]
WC | (Australia) E Winter (Australia) Hugh Winter | 6 | 3 | [10]
(Argentina) RA Burruchaga (Argentina) F Díaz Acosta
(France) P-H Herbert (Switzerland) J Kym | w/o
(United States) R Seggerman (United States) E Spizzirri | 6 | 7^{7}
4 | (United States) C Eubanks (United States) M McDonald | 4 | 6^{3}
(France) H Gaston (Belgium) G Onclin | 3 | 4
WC | (Australia) H Jones (Australia) Pavle Marinkov | 6 | 6
Alt | (Colombia) DE Galán (United States) B Holt | 7^{10} | 2 | [10]
2 | (Australia) MC Romios (United States) R Stalder | 6^{8} | 6 | [6]

Quarterfinals
(United States) A Kovacevic (United States) M Krueger | 6 | 4 | [10]
(United Kingdom) J Fearnley (Australia) P Harper | 4 | 6 | [7]
WC | (Australia) E Winter (Australia) H Winter | 6 | 0 | [7]
(France) P-H Herbert (Switzerland) J Kym | 3 | 6 | [10]
(Portugal) J Faria (Portugal) H Rocha
(United States) R Seggerman (United States) E Spizzirri | w/o
WC | (Australia) H Jones (Australia) P Marinkov | w/o
Alt | (Colombia) DE Galán (United States) B Holt

Semifinals
(United States) A Kovacevic (United States) M Krueger | 1 | 2
(France) P-H Herbert (Switzerland) J Kym | 6 | 6
(United States) R Seggerman (United States) E Spizzirri | 6 | 6
WC | (Australia) H Jones (Australia) P Marinkov | 2 | 4

Final
(France) P-H Herbert (Switzerland) J Kym | 6 | 5 | [5]
(United States) R Seggerman (United States) E Spizzirri | 1 | 7 | [10]
