= 2025 Canberra Tennis International – Women's doubles =

Women's doubles
- 2025 Canberra Tennis International

Final
- Champions: (Australia) Jaimee Fourlis (Australia) Petra Hule
- Runners-up: (Latvia) Darja Semeņistaja (Serbia) Nina Stojanović
- Score: 7–5, 4–6, [10–6]

Events
Singles	men	women
Doubles	men	women
- Canberra Tennis International

Veronika Erjavec and Darja Semeņistaja were the defending champions, but chose to participate with different partners. Erjavec partnered Dominika Šalková, but they lost in the semifinals to Jaimee Fourlis and Petra Hule.

Fourlis and Hule won the title, defeating Semeņistaja and Nina Stojanović 7–5, 4–6, [10–6] in the final.

== Seeds ==
1. (Hungary) Anna Bondár / (Slovenia) Tamara Zidanšek (semifinals)
2. (Slovenia) Veronika Erjavec / (Czech Republic) Dominika Šalková (semifinals)
3. (Latvia) Darja Semeņistaja / (Serbia) Nina Stojanović (final)
4. (Australia) Jaimee Fourlis / (Australia) Petra Hule (champions)

== Draw ==
Key

- Q = Qualifier
- WC = Wild card
- LL = Lucky loser
- Alt = Alternate
- ITF = ITF entry
- PR = Protected ranking
- SR = Special ranking
- SE = Special exempt
- JE = Junior exempt
- JR = Junior Accelerator Programme entrant
- CO = College Accelerator Programme entrant
- NG = Next Gen Accelerator Program entrant
- w/o = Walkover
- r = Retired
- d = Defaulted

=== Draw ===
First round
1	(Hungary) A Bondár (Slovenia) T Zidanšek	6	6
(Croatia) J Fett (Hungary) D Gálfi	3	3
O Selekhmeteva; M Timofeeva	6	6
(Australia) K McPhee (Cyprus) R Șerban	3	3
3	(Latvia) D Semeņistaja (Serbia) N Stojanović	6	6
(Japan) A Ito (Japan) S Saito	4	4
(Austria) S Kraus (Serbia) L Radivojević	5	3
WC	(Australia) L Cabrera (Australia) T Preston	7	6
A Falei; E Pridankina	4	6	[4]
(Australia) A Osborne (Australia) A Parnaby	6	4	[10]
(United States) H Chang (Switzerland) L Küng	6^{4}	5
4	(Australia) J Fourlis (Australia) P Hule	7^{7}	7
(France) E Jacquemot (Canada) M Stakusic	7^{7}	7
Alt	(Italy) G Pedone (Argentina) S Sierra	6^{5}	5
(Croatia) L Bošković (Croatia) A Ružić	3	6^{2}
2	(Slovenia) V Erjavec (Czech Republic) D Šalková	6	7^{7}

Quarterfinals
1	(Hungary) A Bondár (Slovenia) T Zidanšek	w/o
O Selekhmeteva; M Timofeeva
3	(Latvia) D Semeņistaja (Serbia) N Stojanović	6	3	[10]
WC	(Australia) L Cabrera (Australia) T Preston	0	6	[4]
(Australia) A Osborne (Australia) A Parnaby	4	2
4	(Australia) J Fourlis (Australia) P Hule	6	6
(France) E Jacquemot (Canada) M Stakusic	6	1	[6]
2	(Slovenia) V Erjavec (Czech Republic) D Šalková	4	6	[10]

Semifinals
1	(Hungary) A Bondár (Slovenia) T Zidanšek	5	1
3	(Latvia) D Semeņistaja (Serbia) N Stojanović	7	6
4	(Australia) J Fourlis (Australia) P Hule	6	4	[10]
2	(Slovenia) V Erjavec (Czech Republic) D Šalková	4	6	[6]

Final
3	(Latvia) D Semeņistaja (Serbia) N Stojanović	5	6	[6]
4	(Australia) J Fourlis (Australia) P Hule	7	4	[10]
