= 2025 Open Internacional Femení Solgironès – Singles =

Tennis tournament

Singles
- 2025 Open Internacional Femení Solgironès

Final
- Champion: (Latvia) Darja Semeņistaja
- Runner-up: (Hungary) Dalma Gálfi
- Score: 5-7, 6–0, 6–4

Details
- Draw: 32 (4 WC)
- Seeds: 8

Events
Singles	Doubles
- Torneig Internacional de Tennis Femení Solgironès

María Lourdes Carlé was the defending champion, but lost in the second round to Darja Semeņistaja.

Semeņistaja went on to win the title, defeating Dalma Gálfi in the final, 5–7, 6–0, 6–4.

== Seeds ==
1. (Germany) Eva Lys (quarterfinals)
2. (Netherlands) Arantxa Rus (second round)
3. (Argentina) María Lourdes Carlé (second round)
4. (Ukraine) Yuliia Starodubtseva (first round)
5. (France) Diane Parry (first round)
6. (Germany) Jule Niemeier (withdrew)
7. Aliaksandra Sasnovich (second round)
8. (Hungary) Panna Udvardy (semifinals)
9. (Andorra) Victoria Jiménez Kasintseva (first round)

== Draw ==
Key

- Q = Qualifier
- WC = Wild card
- LL = Lucky loser
- Alt = Alternate
- ITF = ITF entry
- PR = Protected ranking
- SR = Special ranking
- SE = Special exempt
- JE = Junior exempt
- JR = Junior Accelerator Programme entrant
- CO = College Accelerator Programme entrant
- NG = Next Gen Accelerator Program entrant
- w/o = Walkover
- r = Retired
- d = Defaulted

=== Finals ===
Semifinals
8	(Hungary) Panna Udvardy	0	5
(Hungary) Dalma Gálfi	6	7
(Latvia) Darja Semeņistaja	5	6	6
WC	(Spain) Aliona Bolsova	7	4	3

Final
(Hungary) Dalma Gálfi	7	0	4
(Latvia) Darja Semeņistaja	5	6	6

=== Top half ===
First round
1	(Germany) E Lys	6	7^{9}
(Italy) N Brancaccio	3	6^{7}
WC	(Spain) M Bassols Ribera	5	6	3
Q	(France) M Rouvroy	7	3	1^{r}
(Austria) S Kraus	4	6	6
(Spain) A Lázaro García	6	2	1
(Serbia) N Stojanović	3	1
8	(Hungary) P Udvardy	6	6
4	(Ukraine) Y Starodubtseva	2	6	4
(Switzerland) S Bandecchi	6	3	6
(Spain) I Burillo Escorihuela	1	2
(France) A Cornet	6	6
(Hungary) D Gálfi	2	6	6
Q	(Spain) K Quevedo	6	4	1
(Italy) G Pedone	4	3
7	A Sasnovich	6	6

Second round
1	(Germany) E Lys	6	6
WC	(Spain) M Bassols Ribera	1	4
(Austria) S Kraus	3	5
8	(Hungary) P Udvardy	6	7
(Switzerland) S Bandecchi	6	4	5
(France) A Cornet	3	6	7
(Hungary) D Gálfi	7	6
7	A Sasnovich	5	1

Quarterfinals
1	(Germany) E Lys	4	6	3
8	(Hungary) P Udvardy	6	2	6
(France) A Cornet	0	0^{r}
(Hungary) D Gálfi	6	3

Semifinals
(Hungary) P Udvardy	0	5
(Hungary) D Gálfi	6	7

=== Bottom half ===
First round
5	(France) D Parry	4	2
LL	(Spain) Á Fita Boluda	6	6
WC	(Spain) G Maristany	3	6	6
WC	(Spain) C Martínez Círez	6	0	2
LL	(Spain) C Cerviño Ruiz	0	1
(Latvia) D Semeņistaja	6	6
(Czech Republic) B Palicová	0	3
3	(Argentina) ML Carlé	6	6
9	(Andorra) V Jiménez Kasintseva	4	6	6^{5}
(Japan) S Saito	6	4	7^{7}
(Romania) M Bulgaru	5	1
Q	(Germany) C Werner	7	6
(Japan) N Hibino	3	3
WC	(Spain) A Bolsova	6	6
Q	A Charaeva	7	5	2
2	(Netherlands) A Rus	5	7	6

Second round
LL	(Spain) Á Fita Boluda	3	2
WC	(Spain) G Maristany	6	6
(Latvia) D Semeņistaja	6	6
3	(Argentina) ML Carlé	1	2
(Japan) S Saito	6	4	3
Q	(Germany) C Werner	2	6	6
WC	(Spain) A Bolsova	6	6
2	(Netherlands) A Rus	3	4

Quarterfinals
WC	(Spain) G Maristany	4	6	2
(Latvia) D Semeņistaja	6	3	6
Q	(Germany) C Werner	1	3
WC	(Spain) A Bolsova	6	6

Semifinals
(Latvia) D Semeņistaja	5	6	6
WC	(Spain) A Bolsova	7	4	3

== Qualifying ==
=== Seeds ===
1. (France) Margaux Rouvroy (qualified)
2. (Spain) Ángela Fita Boluda (qualifying competition, lucky loser)
3. (Croatia) Tena Lukas (qualifying competition)
4. Alina Charaeva (qualified)

=== Qualifiers ===
1. (France) Margaux Rouvroy
2. (Germany) Caroline Werner
3. (Spain) Kaitlin Quevedo
4. Alina Charaeva

=== Lucky losers ===
1. (Spain) Ángela Fita Boluda
2. (Spain) Celia Cerviño Ruiz

=== Qualifying draw ===
==== First qualifier ====
Qualifying competition
1	(France) Margaux Rouvroy	6	6
WC	(Spain) Celia Cerviño Ruiz	2	1

==== Second qualifier ====
Qualifying competition
2	(Spain) Ángela Fita Boluda	6^{3}	5
	(Germany) Caroline Werner	7^{7}	7

==== Third qualifier ====
Qualifying competition
3	(Croatia) Tena Lukas	6	5	1
	(Spain) Kaitlin Quevedo	3	7	6

==== Fourth qualifier ====
Qualifying competition
4	Alina Charaeva	2	6	6
WC	(Spain) Ruth Roura Llaverias	6	1	3
