= 2025 Canberra Tennis International – Men's singles =

Men's singles
- 2025 Canberra Tennis International

Final
- Champion: (Brazil) João Fonseca
- Runner-up: (United States) Ethan Quinn
- Score: 6–4, 6–4

Events
Singles	men	women
Doubles	men	women
- Canberra Tennis International

Dominik Koepfer was the defending champion but lost in the first round to Harold Mayot.

João Fonseca won the title after defeating Ethan Quinn 6–4, 6–4 in the final.

== Seeds ==
1. (France) Hugo Gaston (first round)
2. (Argentina) Facundo Díaz Acosta (first round)
3. (Bosnia and Herzegovina) Damir Džumhur (second round)
4. (Japan) Taro Daniel (first round)
5. (India) Sumit Nagal (first round)
6. (United Kingdom) Jacob Fearnley (semifinals)
7. (Germany) Dominik Koepfer (first round)
8. (Italy) Mattia Bellucci (first round)

== Draw ==
Key

- Q = Qualifier
- WC = Wild card
- LL = Lucky loser
- Alt = Alternate
- ITF = ITF entry
- PR = Protected ranking
- SR = Special ranking
- SE = Special exempt
- JE = Junior exempt
- JR = Junior Accelerator Programme entrant
- CO = College Accelerator Programme entrant
- NG = Next Gen Accelerator Program entrant
- w/o = Walkover
- r = Retired
- d = Defaulted

=== Finals ===
Semifinals
(Spain) Martín Landaluce	3	3
Q	(United States) Ethan Quinn	6	6
6	(United Kingdom) Jacob Fearnley	3	3
(Brazil) João Fonseca	6	6

Final
Q	(United States) Ethan Quinn	4	4
(Brazil) João Fonseca	6	6

=== Top half ===
First round
1	(France) H Gaston	2	2
PR	(Japan) Y Watanuki	6	6
LL	(Argentina) RA Burruchaga	6	6
(Portugal) J Faria	3	3
(France) L Van Assche	4	4
WC	(Australia) D Sweeny	6	6
(Spain) M Landaluce	6	6
8	(Italy) M Bellucci	3	2
3	(Bosnia and Herzegovina) D Džumhur	7^{7}	6^{5}	6
Q	(Lebanon) H Habib	6^{5}	7^{7}	2
(Czech Republic) V Kopřiva	7^{7}	3	6
Alt	(United States) M Krueger	6^{5}	6	3
WC	(Australia) B Ellis	6^{4}	6^{5}
Q	(United States) E Quinn	7^{7}	7^{7}
Q	(United States) P Kypson	6	4	6
5	(India) S Nagal	2	6	1

Second round
PR	(Japan) Y Watanuki	6	3	7^{7}
LL	(Argentina) RA Burruchaga	3	6	6^{5}
WC	(Australia) D Sweeny	1	2
(Spain) M Landaluce	6	6
3	(Bosnia and Herzegovina) D Džumhur	5	5
(Czech Republic) V Kopřiva	7	7
Q	(United States) E Quinn	3	7^{7}	6
Q	(United States) P Kypson	6	6^{5}	4

Quarterfinals
PR	(Japan) Y Watanuki
(Spain) M Landaluce	w/o
(Czech Republic) V Kopřiva	4	5
Q	(United States) E Quinn	6	7

Semifinals
(Spain) M Landaluce	3	3
Q	(United States) E Quinn	6	6

=== Bottom half ===
First round
6	(United Kingdom) J Fearnley	3	6	7
WC	(Australia) Matthew Dellavedova	6	4	5
(Switzerland) J Kym	6^{6}	6^{4}
Q	(Japan) J Trotter	7^{8}	7^{7}
(United States) C Eubanks	6	7^{7}
(United States) A Kovacevic	3	6^{5}
Q	(Canada) A Galarneau	7^{7}	6
4	(Japan) T Daniel	6^{2}	2
7	(Germany) D Koepfer	4	4
(France) H Mayot	6	6
(Colombia) DE Galán	6	3	6
(Belgium) R Collignon	2	6	2
(United States) M McDonald	1	3
(Brazil) J Fonseca	6	6
(Croatia) D Ajduković	6	6
2	(Argentina) F Díaz Acosta	4	4

Second round
6	(United Kingdom) J Fearnley	6	6
Q	(Japan) J Trotter	2	4
(United States) C Eubanks	6	6
Q	(Canada) A Galarneau	4	4
(France) H Mayot	7^{7}	6
(Colombia) DE Galán	6^{5}	4
(Brazil) J Fonseca	6	7
(Croatia) D Ajduković	1	5

Quarterfinals
6	(United Kingdom) J Fearnley	4	6	7^{7}
(United States) C Eubanks	6	2	6^{3}
(France) H Mayot	2	3
(Brazil) J Fonseca	6	6

Semifinals
6	(United Kingdom) J Fearnley	3	3
(Brazil) J Fonseca	6	6
