= 2025 Open Villa de Madrid =

Tennis tournament

- Date: 14–20 April 2025
- Edition: 4th
- Category: ITF Women's World Tennis Tour
- Prize money: $100,000
- Surface: Clay / Outdoor
- Location: Madrid, Spain

Champions

Singles
- (Egypt) Mayar Sherif

Doubles
- (Italy) Nicole Fossa Huergo / (Kazakhstan) Zhibek Kulambayeva
- Open Villa de Madrid

The 2025 Open Villa de Madrid was a professional tennis tournament play on outdoor clay courts. It was the fourth edition of the tournament, which was part of the 2025 ITF Women's World Tennis Tour. It took place in Madrid, Spain, between 14 and 20 April 2025.

== Champions ==
=== Singles ===
- (Egypt) Mayar Sherif def. (Mexico) Renata Zarazúa, 6–3, 6–4

=== Doubles ===
- (Italy) Nicole Fossa Huergo / (Kazakhstan) Zhibek Kulambayeva def. (Spain) Marina Bassols Ribera / (Spain) Andrea Lázaro García, 7–6^{(9–7)}, 6–7^{(4–7)}, [10–4].

== Singles main draw entrants ==
=== Seeds ===
Country	Player	Rank	Seed
EGY	Mayar Sherif	62	1
MEX	Renata Zarazúa	71	2
CRO	Antonia Ružić	114	3
ARG	María Carlé	116	4
FRA	Chloé Paquet	118	5
ESP	Leyre Romero Gormaz	124	6
	Oksana Selekhmeteva	153	7
GER	Tamara Korpatsch	187	8

- Rankings are as of 7 April 2025.

=== Other entrants ===
The following players received wildcards into the singles main draw:

- (Spain) Aliona Bolsova
- (Spain) Carlota Corte
- (Spain) Carlota Martínez Círez
- (Spain) Marta Soriano Santiago

The following players received entry from the qualifying draw:

- (Spain) Noelia Bouzo Zanotti
- (Spain) Cristina Diaz Adrover
- (Spain) Ariana Geerlings
- (Italy) Verena Meliss
- (Ukraine) Veronika Podrez
- (Romania) Andreea Prisacariu
- (Netherlands) Anouck Vrancken Peeters
- (Germany) Caroline Werner
