= Open Villa de Madrid =

- 2026 Open Villa de Madrid

WTA 125
- Event name: Grand Prix Open Villa de Madrid by Silverway
- Location: Madrid, Spain
- Venue: Club de Campo Villa de Madrid
- Category: WTA 125
- Surface: Clay
- Draw: 32S/16Q/15D
- Prize money: €100,000
- Website: Website

Current champions (2026)
- Singles: (Italy) Lisa Pigato
- Doubles: (Spain) Irene Burillo; Elena Pridankina

The Open Villa de Madrid is a tournament for professional female tennis players played on outdoor clay courts. The event is classified as a WTA 125 tournament since 2026 after previously being held as a $100,000 ITF Women's Circuit tournament and has been held in Madrid, Spain since 2022.

== Past finals ==
=== Singles ===
Year	Champion	Runner-up	Score
2026	(Italy) Lisa Pigato	(Spain) Marina Bassols Ribera	6–4, 6–0
2025	(Egypt) Mayar Sherif	(Mexico) Renata Zarazúa	6–4, 6–3
2024	(Japan) Moyuka Uchijima	(Spain) Leyre Romero Gormaz	5–7, 6–4, 7–5
2023	(Serbia) Olga Danilović	(Spain) Sara Sorribes Tormo	6–3, 6–2
2022	(Spain) Aliona Bolsova	(Germany) Tamara Korpatsch	6–4, 6–2

=== Doubles ===
Year	Champions	Runners-up	Score
2026	(Spain) Irene Burillo; Elena Pridankina	(Romania) Irina Bara (Latvia) Darja Semeņistaja	4–6, 6–3, [10–3]
2025	(Italy) Nicole Fossa Huergo (Kazakhstan) Zhibek Kulambayeva	(Spain) Marina Bassols Ribera (Spain) Andrea Lázaro García	7–6^{(7)}, 6–7^{(4)}, [10–4]
2024	(Australia) Destanee Aiava (Greece) Eleni Christofi	(Venezuela) Andrea Gámiz (Netherlands) Eva Vedder	6–3, 2–6, [10–5]
2023	(Japan) Mai Hontama (Japan) Eri Hozumi	(Greece) Eleni Christofi (Greece) Despina Papamichail	6–0, 7–5
2022	(Spain) Aliona Bolsova (Spain) Rebeka Masarova	(Croatia) Lea Bošković (Latvia) Daniela Vismane	6–3, 6–3
