= Lea Bošković =

Croatian tennis player (born 1999)

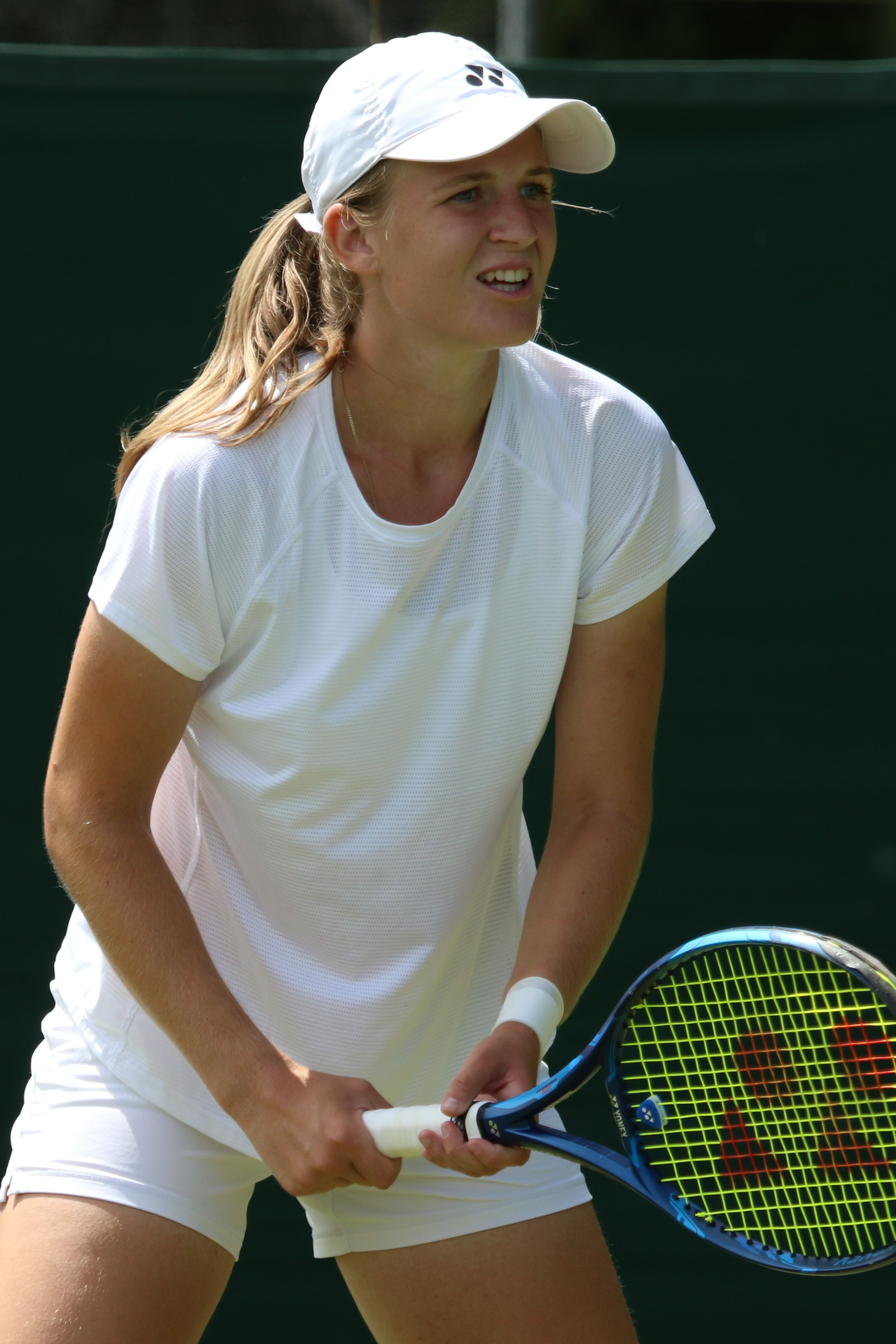
- Bošković at the 2022 Wimbledon Championships
- Country (sports): Croatia
- Residence: Zagreb, Croatia
- Born: 22 September 1999 (age 27) Zagreb
- Height: 1.79 m (5 ft 10 in)
- Plays: Right (one-handed backhand)
- Prize money: $431,997

Singles
- Career record: 275–201
- Career titles: 7 ITF
- Highest ranking: No. 158 (9 September 2024)
- Current ranking: No. 329 (28 September 2026)

Grand Slam singles results
- Australian Open: Q1 (2024, 2025)
- French Open: Q2 (2024)
- Wimbledon: Q3 (2024)
- US Open: Q3 (2024)

Doubles
- Career record: 93–54
- Career titles: 8 ITF
- Highest ranking: No. 215 (27 February 2023)

Team competitions
- Fed Cup: 8–4
- Last updated on: 1 October 2026.

Lea Bošković (Croatian pronunciation: [lêa bôʃkoʋitɕ]; born 22 September 1999) is a Croatian tennis player. She has a career-high singles ranking of world No. 158, achieved 9 September 2024, and a best doubles ranking of No. 215, reached on 27 February 2023. Bošković has won seven singles and eight doubles titles on the ITF Circuit.

On the ITF Junior Circuit, she had a career-high combined ranking of 19, achieved on 5 June 2017. In 2017, she reached the US Open girls' doubles final, partnering Wang Xiyu.

Bošković made her Fed Cup debut for Croatia in 2018, she has achieved a win–loss record of 8–4.

== Career ==
On her WTA Tour main-draw debut, Bošković reached the quarterfinals as a lucky loser at the 2024 Iași Open, defeating Maria Timofeeva, for her first tour win, and qualifier Varvara Lepchenko, both achieved in straight sets, before losing in the last eight to top seed and eventual champion, Mirra Andreeva.

At the 2025 Copa Colsanitas, Bošković qualified for the main draw and reached her second WTA Tour quarterfinal upsetting eighth seed Cristina Bucsa.

== Grand Slam singles performance timeline ==
Key
W	F	SF	QF	#R	RR	Q#	DNQ	A	NH

(W) winner; (F) finalist; (SF) semifinalist; (QF) quarterfinalist; (#R) rounds 4, 3, 2, 1; (RR) round-robin stage; (Q#) qualification round; (DNQ) did not qualify; (A) absent; (NH) not held; (SR) strike rate (events won / competed); (W–L) win–loss record.
To avoid confusion and double counting, these charts are updated at the conclusion of a tournament or when the player's participation has ended.

Tournament	2022	2023	2024	2025	2026	W–L
Australian Open	A	A	Q1	Q1	A	0–0
French Open	A	A	Q2	Q1	A	0–0
Wimbledon	Q1	A	Q3	Q1	A	0–0
US Open	A	A	Q3	A	A	0–0
Win–loss	0–0	0–0	0–0	0–0	0–0	0–0

== ITF Circuit finals ==
=== Singles: 18 (7 titles, 11 runner-ups) ===
Legend W60/75 tournaments W40/50 tournaments W25/35 tournaments W15 tournaments	Finals by surface Hard (2–4) Clay (5–7)

Result	W–L	Date	Tournament	Tier	Surface	Opponent	Score
Win	1–0	Apr 2017	ITF Tučepi, Croatia	W15	Clay	(Slovakia) Lenka Juríková	6–3, 1–6, 6–1
Win	2–0	Mar 2018	ITF Hammamet, Tunisia	W15	Clay	(Bulgaria) Isabella Shinikova	6–7^{(7)}, 6–3, 6–4
Loss	2–1	Apr 2018	ITF Hammamet, Tunisia	W15	Clay	(Paraguay) Montserrat González	6–2, 2–6, 2–6
Win	3–1	Apr 2018	ITF Tučepi, Croatia	W15	Clay	(Croatia) Tena Lukas	1–6, 6–0, 6–4
Loss	3–2	Jul 2018	ITF Prokuplje, Serbia	W15	Clay	(Czech Republic) Gabriela Pantůčková	2–6, 6–2, 3–6
Loss	3–3	Jul 2018	ITF Prokuplje, Serbia	W15	Clay	(Czech Republic) Gabriela Pantůčková	3–6, 0–6
Win	4–3	Jul 2019	ITF Horb, Germany	W25	Clay	(Switzerland) Simona Waltert	6–4, 0–6, 6–1
Win	5–3	Nov 2020	ITF Sharm El Sheikh, Egypt	W15	Hard	(Chinese Taipei) Joanna Garland	6–4, 6–4
Loss	5–4	Dec 2020	ITF Selva Gardena, Italy	W25	Hard (i)	(China) Zheng Qinwen	7–6^{(0)}, 0–6, 3–6
Loss	5–5	Jun 2021	ITF Otočec, Slovenia	W25	Clay	(Belgium) Maryna Zanevska	6–7^{(4)}, 0–6
Loss	5–6	Jun 2022	ITF Tarvisio, Italy	W25	Clay	(Croatia) Tara Würth	5–7, 0–6
Win	6–6	Aug 2022	Ladies Open Hechingen, Germany	W60	Clay	(Germany) Noma Noha Akugue	7–5, 3–6, 6–4
Loss	6–7	Dec 2022	ITF Monastir, Tunisia	W25	Hard	(Turkey) Çağla Büyükakçay	5–7, 6–0, 2–6
Loss	6–8	Jul 2023	ITS Cup Olomouc, Czech Republic	W60	Clay	(Latvia) Darja Semeņistaja	7–6^{(6)}, 3–6, 1–6
Win	7–8	Oct 2023	ITF Baza, Spain	W25	Hard	Alina Charaeva	6–3, 6–2
Loss	7–9	Nov 2023	ITF Funchal, Portugal	W40	Hard	(Czech Republic) Dominika Šalková	6–4, 5–7, 3–6
Loss	7–10	Nov 2025	ITF Istanbul, Turkey	W35	Hard (i)	Alexandra Shubladze	2–6, 2–6
Loss	7–11	Jul 2026	ITF The Hague, Netherlands	W75	Clay	(Netherlands) Eva Vedder	4–6, 3–6

=== Doubles: 16 (8 titles, 8 runner-ups) ===
Legend W80 tournaments W25 tournaments W10/15 tournaments	Finals by surface Hard (1–1) Clay (7–7)

Result	W–L	Date	Tournament	Tier	Surface	Partner	Opponents	Score
Loss	0–1	Oct 2016	ITF Bol, Croatia	W10	Clay	(Norway) Malene Helgo	(Croatia) Mariana Dražić (Hungary) Rebeka Stolmar	6–7^{(5)}, 6–7^{(5)}
Win	1–1	Oct 2016	ITF Bol, Croatia	W10	Clay	(Slovenia) Kaja Juvan	(Croatia) Mariana Dražić (Croatia) Ani Mijačika	4–6, 7–5, [10–4]
Win	2–1	Oct 2017	ITF Hammamet, Tunisia	W15	Clay	(France) Yasmine Mansouri	(Croatia) Mariana Dražić (Bulgaria) Isabella Shinikova	1–6, 6–4, [10–6]
Win	3–1	Jul 2018	ITF Prokuplje, Serbia	W15	Clay	(Slovenia) Veronika Erjavec	(Serbia) Barbara Bonić (Australia) Jelena Stojanovic	6–0, 3–6, [10–7]
Loss	3–2	Aug 2018	ITF Bad Saulgau, Germany	W25	Clay	(United States) Chiara Scholl	(Uzbekistan) Albina Khabibulina (Belgium) Helène Scholsen	2–6, 4–6
Loss	3–3	Oct 2018	ITF Santa Margherita di Pula, Italy	W25	Clay	(Romania) Cristina Dinu	(Italy) Martina Colmegna (Italy) Federica di Sarra	4–6, 6–7^{(1)}
Win	4–3	Sep 2019	ITF Frýdek-Místek, Czech Republic	W25	Clay	(Greece) Despina Papamichail	(Romania) Oana Georgeta Simion (Germany) Julia Wachaczyk	6–3, 6–2
Loss	4–4	Nov 2019	ITF Naples, United States	W25	Clay	(Australia) Seone Mendez	(Mexico) María Portillo Ramírez (Romania) Gabriela Talabă	5–7, 2–6
Loss	4–5	May 2021	ITF Otočec, Slovenia	W25	Clay	(Cyprus) Raluca Șerban	(Italy) Federica di Sarra (Italy) Camilla Rosatello	4–6, 7–6^{(4)}, [4–10]
Loss	4–6	Apr 2022	ITF Santa Margherita die Pula, Italy	W25	Clay	(Croatia) Tena Lukas	(North Macedonia) Lina Gjorcheska (Netherlands) Eva Vedder	5–7, 2–6
Win	5–6	May 2022	ITF Split, Croatia	W25	Clay	(Slovenia) Veronika Erjavec	(Japan) Mana Kawamura (Japan) Funa Kozaki	4–6, 6–1, [10–2]
Win	6–6	May 2022	ITF Warmbad-Villach, Austria	W25	Clay	(Slovenia) Veronika Erjavec	(Japan) Miharu Imanishi (Japan) Kanako Morisaki	3–6, 6–3, [11–9]
Win	7–6	Jul 2022	ITF Tarvisio, Italy	W25	Clay	(Slovenia) Veronika Erjavec	(Romania) Ilona Georgiana Ghioroaie (Romania) Oana Georgeta Simion	6–1, 6–7^{(5)}, [10–7]
Win	8–6	Oct 2022	Trnava Indoor, Slovakia	W25	Hard (i)	(Poland) Weronika Falkowska	(China) Lu Jiajing (Romania) Oana Georgeta Simion	7–6^{(7)}, 2–6, [10–6]
Loss	8–7	Nov 2022	Open Villa de Madrid, Spain	W80	Clay	(Latvia) Daniela Vismane	(Spain) Aliona Bolsova (Spain) Rebeka Masarova	3–6, 3–6
Loss	8–8	Oct 2023	ITF Baza, Spain	W25	Hard	(Spain) Ángela Fita Boluda	(Australia) Olivia Gadecki (United Kingdom) Samantha Murray Sharan	5–7, 6–4, [4–10]

== Junior finals ==
=== Grand Slam tournaments ===
==== Doubles: 1 (runner-up) ====
Result	Year	Tournament	Surface	Partner	Opponents	Score
Loss	2017	US Open	Hard	(China) Wang Xiyu	(Serbia) Olga Danilović (Ukraine) Marta Kostyuk	1–6, 5–7

== Fed Cup participation ==
=== Singles (7–3) ===
Edition	Stage	Date	Location	Against	Surface	Opponent	W/L	Score
2018 Fed Cup; Europe/Africa; Zone Group I	RR	7 February 2018	Tallinn, Estonia	Slovenia	Hard (i)	Kaja Juvan	W	6–4, 4–6, 6–2
2018 Fed Cup; Europe/Africa; Zone Group I	RR	8 February 2018	Tallinn, Estonia	Sweden	Hard (i)	Cornelia Lister	W	6–4, 3–6, 7–5
2018 Fed Cup; Europe/Africa; Zone Group I	RR	9 February 2018	Tallinn, Estonia	Hungary	Hard (i)	Dalma Gálfi	L	2–6, 6–2, 5–7
2020 Fed Cup; Europe/Africa; Zone Group I	RR	5 February 2020	Tallinn, Estonia	Bulgaria	Hard (i)	Isabella Shinikova	W	2–6, 6–4, 6–4
2020 Fed Cup; Europe/Africa; Zone Group I	RR	7 February 2020	Tallinn, Estonia	Ukraine	Hard (i)	Dayana Yastremska	L	4–6, 4–6
2020 Fed Cup; Europe/Africa; Zone Group I	PO	8 February 2020	Tallinn, Estonia	Italy	Hard (i)	Elisabetta Cocciaretto	L	3–6, 3–6
2024 BJK Cup; Europe/Africa; Zone Group II	RR	9 April 2024	Vilnius, Lithuania	Estonia	Hard (i)	Elena Malygina	W	6–2, 6–3
2024 BJK Cup; Europe/Africa; Zone Group II	RR	10 April 2024	Vilnius, Lithuania	North; Macedonia	Hard (i)	Magdalena Stoilkovska	W	7–5, 6–2
2024 BJK Cup; Europe/Africa; Zone Group II	PO	12 April 2024	Vilnius, Lithuania	Egypt	Hard (i)	Sandra Samir	W	6–1, 6–4
2024 BJK Cup; Europe/Africa; Zone Group II	PO	13 April 2024	Vilnius, Lithuania	Lithuania	Hard (i)	Justina Mikulskyte	W	3–6, 6–2, 7–5

=== Doubles (1–0) ===
Edition	Stage	Date	Location	Against	Surface	Partner	Opponents	W/L	Score
2024 BJK Cup Europe/ Africa Zone Group II	RR	10 April 2024	Vilnius, Lithuania	North; Macedonia	Hard (i)	Iva Primorac	Iva Daneva; Ana Mitevska	W	6–0, 6–0
