= Darja Semeņistaja =

Latvian tennis player (born 2002)

- Semeņistaja at the 2026 Wimbledon Championships
- Country (sports): Latvia
- Born: 16 September 2002 (age 24)
- Plays: Left (two-handed backhand)
- Prize money: $963,273

Singles
- Career record: 245–146
- Career titles: 2 WTA 125
- Highest ranking: No. 87 (27 October 2025)
- Current ranking: No. 109 (24 August 2026)

Grand Slam singles results
- Australian Open: 1R (2026)
- French Open: Q2 (2024, 2026)
- Wimbledon: 1R (2026)
- US Open: 1R (2025, 2026)

Doubles
- Career record: 127–90
- Career titles: 2 WTA Challenger, 10 ITF
- Highest ranking: No. 119 (8 September 2025)
- Current ranking: No. 167 (24 August 2026)

Team competitions
- Fed Cup: 4–6
- Last updated on: 1 September 2026.

Darja Semeņistaja (born 16 September 2002) is a Latvian tennis player. She has career-high WTA rankings of No. 87 in singles, achieved on 27 October 2025, and No. 119 in doubles, reached on 8 September 2025. Semeņistaja has won two singles and two doubles titles on the WTA Challenger Tour.

Playing for Latvia Billie Jean King Cup team, she has a win-loss record of 4–6.

She has also won 16 singles and ten doubles titles on the ITF Circuit.

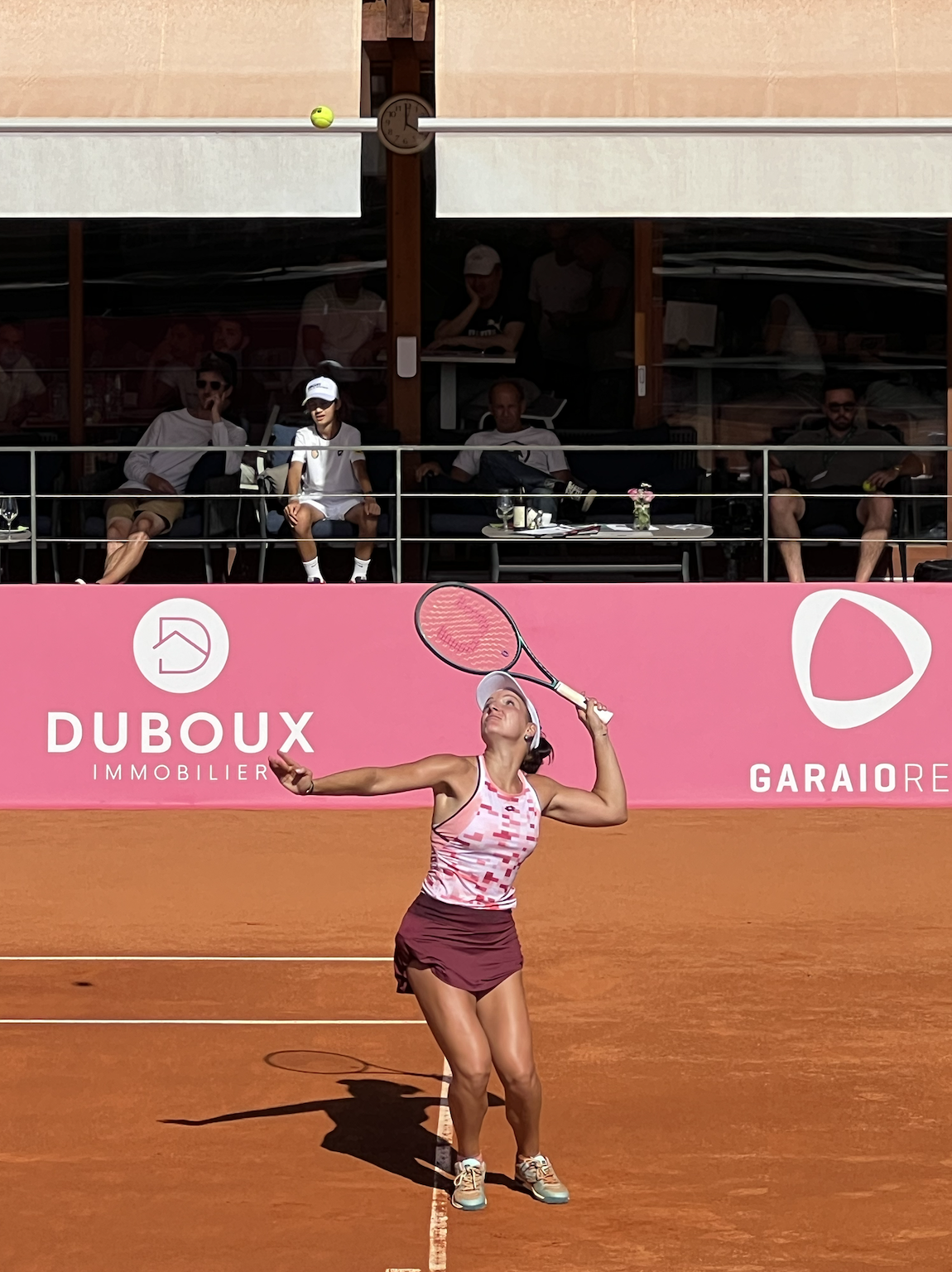
Semenistaja on serve in semifinals of the 2024 Montreux Ladies Open

== Career ==
=== 2021: Seven ITF Circuit titles ===
In 2021, Semeņistaja won the most singles trophies on the ITF Women's World Tour, a total of seven titles. She won the first two in Serbia, winning Prokuplje's 15k events for two weeks in a row, then the third in Bratislava in mid-July, the fourth in Chornomorsk, Ukraine, at the end of August, and finally three in Cancún, Mexico in October.

=== 2024: WTA 125 success ===
Alongside Veronika Erjavec, Semeņistaja won the doubles title at the Canberra Tennis International, overcoming Kaylah McPhee and Astra Sharma in the final.

She won her first WTA 125 singles title at the Mumbai Open in February, defeating Storm Hunter in the final. Later that month at the ATX Open, Semeņistaja recorded her maiden WTA Tour main-draw match win, against wildcard entrant Victoria Jiménez Kasintseva, before losing to sixth seed Wang Xiyu in the second round.

Partnering Carole Monnet, Semeņistaja won the doubles title at the Țiriac Foundation Trophy, defeating Aliona Bolsova and Katarzyna Kawa in the final.

=== 2025: Major and top 100 debuts ===
Partnering Nina Stojanović, Semeņistaja reached the doubles final at the Canberra International for the second successive year, losing to Jaimee Fourlis and Petra Hule in a deciding champions tiebreak.

In April, she won her second WTA 125 singles title at the Open Internacional Solgironès, defeating Dalma Gálfi in the final.

Semeņistaja qualified to make her major debut at the US Open, losing to Peyton Stearns in the first round.

She reached the top 100 at world No. 90 in the rankings on 20 October 2025, following her title run at the Les Franqueses del Vallès W100 event. She became the 26th player to reach the milestone in the 2025 season.

=== 2026: First WTA Tour quarterfinal ===
At the Copa Colsanitas, Semeņistaja defeated fifth seed Ella Seidel and Despina Papamichail to reach her first WTA Tour quarterfinal, at which point her run was ended by top seed and eventual champion, Marie Bouzková.

== Grand Slam performance timeline ==
Key
| W | F | SF | QF | #R | RR | Q# | DNQ | A | NH |

(W) winner; (F) finalist; (SF) semifinalist; (QF) quarterfinalist; (#R) rounds 4, 3, 2, 1; (RR) round-robin stage; (Q#) qualification round; (DNQ) did not qualify; (A) absent; (NH) not held; (SR) strike rate (events won / competed); (W–L) win–loss record.
To avoid confusion and double counting, these charts are updated at the conclusion of a tournament or when the player's participation has ended.

=== Singles ===
| Tournament | 2023 | 2024 | 2025 | 2026 | W–L |
|---|---|---|---|---|---|
| Australian Open | A | Q2 | Q1 | 1R | 0–1 |
| French Open | Q1 | Q2 | Q1 | Q2 | 0–0 |
| Wimbledon | Q3 | Q1 | Q3 | 1R | 0–1 |
| US Open | Q2 | Q1 | 1R | 1R | 0–2 |
| Win–loss | 0–0 | 0–0 | 0–1 | 0–3 | 0–4 |

== WTA 125 finals ==
=== Singles: 4 (2 titles, 2 runner-ups) ===
| Result | W–L | Date | Tournament | Surface | Opponent | Score |
|---|---|---|---|---|---|---|
| Win | 1–0 | Feb 2024 | Mumbai Open, India | Hard | (Australia) Storm Hunter | 5–7, 7–6^{(8–6)}, 6–2 |
| Win | 2–0 | Apr 2025 | Solgironès Open, Spain | Clay | (Hungary) Dalma Gálfi | 5–7, 6–0, 6–4 |
| Loss | 2–1 | Sep 2025 | Montreux Ladies Open, Switzerland | Clay | (Poland) Maja Chwalińska | 1–6, 2–6 |
| Loss | 2–2 | Jun 2026 | Makarska Open, Croatia | Clay | (Uzbekistan) Maria Timofeeva | 2–6, 3–6 |

=== Doubles: 7 (2 titles, 5 runner-ups) ===
| Result | W–L | Date | Tournament | Surface | Partner | Opponents | Score |
|---|---|---|---|---|---|---|---|
| Win | 1–0 | Jan 2024 | Canberra International, Australia | Hard | (Slovenia) Veronika Erjavec | (Australia) Kaylah McPhee (Australia) Astra Sharma | 6–2, 6–4 |
| Win | 2–0 | Sep 2024 | Țiriac Foundation Trophy, Romania | Clay | (France) Carole Monnet | (Spain) Aliona Bolsova (Poland) Katarzyna Kawa | 1–6, 6–2, [10–7] |
| Loss | 2–1 | Jan 2025 | Canberra International, Australia | Hard | (Serbia) Nina Stojanović | (Australia) Jaimee Fourlis (Australia) Petra Hule | 5–7, 4–6), [5–10] |
| Loss | 2–2 | Apr 2025 | Solgironès Open, Spain | Clay | (Serbia) Nina Stojanović | (Belgium) Magali Kempen (Czech Republic) Anna Sisková | 6–7^{(1–7)}, 1–6 |
| Loss | 2–3 | Jul 2025 | Internazionale di Roma, Italy | Clay | (Georgia (country)) Ekaterine Gorgodze | (Chinese Taipei) Cho I-hsuan (Chinese Taipei) Cho Yi-tsen | 6–4, 4–6, [6–10] |
| Loss | 2–4 | Apr 2026 | Open Villa de Madrid, Spain | Clay | (Romania) Irina Bara | (Spain) Irene Burillo (Russia) Elena Pridankina | 6–4, 3–6, [3–10] |
| Loss | 2–5 | Apr 2026 | Oeiras Ladies Open, Portugal | Clay | (Switzerland) Naïma Karamoko | (Slovenia) Veronika Erjavec (France) Kristina Mladenovic | 2–6, 5–7 |

== ITF Circuit finals ==
=== Singles: 19 (16 titles, 3 runner-ups) ===
| Legend W100 tournaments (1–1) W60/75 tournaments (3–1) W40/50 tournaments (2–0) W25 tournaments (3–1) W15 tournaments (7–0) | Finals by surface Hard (7–1) Clay (9–2) |

| Result | W–L | Date | Tournament | Tier | Surface | Opponent | Score |
|---|---|---|---|---|---|---|---|
| Win | 1–0 | Jul 2021 | ITF Prokuplje, Serbia | W15 | Clay | (France) Alice Robbe | 6–2, 2–6, 6–3 |
| Win | 2–0 | Jul 2021 | ITF Prokuplje, Serbia | W15 | Clay | (Serbia) Natalija Senić | 6–0, 6–2 |
| Win | 3–0 | Aug 2021 | ITF Bratislava, Slovakia | W15 | Clay | (Slovenia) Pia Lovrič | 6–4, 6–3 |
| Win | 4–0 | Aug 2021 | ITF Chornomorsk, Ukraine | W15 | Clay | (Italy) Nicole Fossa Huergo | 6–3, 6–2 |
| Win | 5–0 | Oct 2021 | ITF Cancún, Mexico | W15 | Hard | (Mexico) María Portillo Ramírez | 6–3, 7–5 |
| Win | 6–0 | Oct 2021 | ITF Cancún, Mexico | W15 | Hard | (Mexico) María Portillo Ramírez | 5–7, 7–6^{(5)}, 6–0 |
| Win | 7–0 | Oct 2021 | ITF Cancún, Mexico | W15 | Hard | (United States) Rachel Gailis | 7–5, 7–5 |
| Win | 8–0 | Feb 2022 | ITF Cancún, Mexico | W25 | Hard | (Israel) Lina Glushko | 4–6, 7–6^{(5)}, 6–2 |
| Win | 9–0 | May 2022 | ITF Santa Margherita di Pula, Italy | W25 | Clay | Irina Khromacheva | 6–4, 4–6, 6–1 |
| Win | 10–0 | Jun 2022 | ITF Ystad, Sweden | W25 | Clay | (Denmark) Sofia Samavati | 3–6, 6–3, 6–1 |
| Win | 11–0 | Feb 2023 | ITF Mexico City, Mexico | W40 | Hard | Jana Kolodynska | 7–5, 4–0 ret. |
| Loss | 11–1 | Feb 2023 | ITF Santo Domingo, Dominican Rep. | W25 | Hard | (France) Carole Monnet | 5–7, 6–3, 1–6 |
| Win | 12–1 | May 2023 | Prague Open, Czech Republic | W60 | Clay | (Spain) Jéssica Bouzas Maneiro | 2–6, 6–3, 6–4 |
| Win | 13–1 | Jul 2023 | Liepāja Open, Latvia | W60 | Clay | (United States) Jessie Aney | 6–4, 6–4 |
| Win | 14–1 | Jul 2023 | ITS Cup Olomouc, Czech Republic | W60 | Clay | (Croatia) Lea Bošković | 6–7^{(6)}, 6–3, 6–1 |
| Win | 15–1 | Jan 2024 | ITF Bangalore, India | W50 | Hard | (France) Carole Monnet | 6–1, 3–0 ret. |
| Loss | 15–2 | Sep 2024 | Šibenik Open, Croatia | W75 | Clay | (Czech Republic) Sára Bejlek | 2–6, 0–6 |
| Loss | 15–3 | Sep 2025 | Lisboa Belém Open, Portugal | W100 | Clay | (Switzerland) Simona Waltert | 2–6, 1–6 |
| Win | 16–3 | Oct 2025 | ITF Les Franqueses del Vallès, Spain | W100 | Hard | (Poland) Linda Klimovičová | 7–5, 7–6^{(4)} |

=== Doubles: 17 (10 titles, 7 runner-ups) ===
| Legend W100 tournaments (1–1) W60/75 tournaments (1–2) W40/50 tournaments (2–1) W25 tournaments (2–2) W15 tournaments (4–1) | Finals by surface Hard (6–5) Clay (4–2) |

| Result | W–L | Date | Tournament | Tier | Surface | Partner | Opponents | Score |
|---|---|---|---|---|---|---|---|---|
| Loss | 0–1 | Sep 2020 | ITF Monastir, Tunisia | W15 | Hard | (Denmark) Olivia Gram | (Belarus) Yuliya Hatouka (Belarus) Anna Kubareva | 6–2, 5–7, [6–10] |
| Win | 1–1 | Sep 2020 | ITF Monastir, Tunisia | W15 | Hard | (Czech Republic) Laetitia Pulchartová | (Russia) Darya Astakhova (Russia) Anastasia Sukhotina | 6–2, 6–7^{(8)}, [10–5] |
| Win | 2–1 | Oct 2020 | ITF Monastir, Tunisia | W15 | Hard | (Russia) Darya Astakhova | (Argentina) María Lourdes Carlé (Denmark) Olivia Gram | 6–4, 6–3 |
| Win | 3–1 | Oct 2021 | ITF Cancún, Mexico | W15 | Hard | (United States) Anna Ulyashchenko | (Venezuela) Nadia Echeverría Alam (United States) Rushri Wijesundera | 6–4, 6–4 |
| Loss | 3–2 | Feb 2022 | ITF Cancún, Mexico | W25 | Hard | (Russia) Maria Bondarenko | (United States) Anna Rogers (United States) Christina Rosca | 1–6, 4–6 |
| Loss | 3–3 | Mar 2022 | ITF Santo Domingo, Dominican Republic | W25 | Hard | (Russia) Anastasia Tikhonova | (Russia) Irina Khromacheva (Serbia) Natalija Stevanović | 1–6, 6–7^{(5)} |
| Win | 4–3 | Sep 2022 | ITF Pula, Italy | W25 | Clay | (Kazakhstan) Zhibek Kulambayeva | (China) Lu Jiajing (Bosnia and Herzegovina) Anita Wagner | 6–2, 6–2 |
| Win | 5–3 | Dec 2022 | ITF Valencia, Spain | W15 | Clay | (France) Marine Szostak | (Spain) Lucía Cortez Llorca (Spain) Claudia Hoste Ferrer | w/o |
| Loss | 5–4 | Feb 2023 | ITF Mexico City, Mexico | W40 | Hard | (Netherlands) Suzan Lamens | (United States) Sofia Sewing (Turkey) Berfu Cengiz | 1–6, 6–1, [10–12] |
| Win | 6–4 | Feb 2023 | ITF Santo Domingo, Dominican Republic | W25 | Hard | (United States) Sofia Sewing | (Hong Kong) Eudice Chong (Bosnia and Herzegovina) Nefisa Berberović | 6–3, 6–2 |
| Win | 7–4 | Jul 2023 | Liepāja Open, Latvia | W60 | Clay | (Latvia) Daniela Vismane | (Turkey) Çağla Büyükakçay (North Macedonia) Lina Gjorcheska | 6–4, 2–6, [10–3] |
| Loss | 7–5 | Jul 2023 | ITS Cup Olomouc, Czech Republic | W60 | Clay | (Kazakhstan) Zhibek Kulambayeva | (Czech Republic) Magdaléna Smékalová (Czech Republic) Tereza Valentová | 2–6, 2–6 |
| Loss | 7–6 | Oct 2023 | ITF Les Franqueses del Vallès, Spain | W100 | Hard | (China) Gao Xinyu | (Italy) Camilla Rosatello (Italy) Angelica Moratelli | 6–4, 5–7, [6–10] |
| Win | 8–6 | Jan 2024 | Bangalore Open, India | W50 | Hard | (Italy) Camilla Rosatello | (Chinese Taipei) Li Yu-yun (Japan) Eri Shimizu | 3–6, 6–2, [10–8] |
| Win | 9–6 | Jan 2024 | Pune Open, India | W50 | Hard | (Philippines) Alex Eala | (United Kingdom) Naiktha Bains (Hungary) Fanny Stollár | 7–6^{(8)}, 6–3 |
| Win | 10–6 | Apr 2025 | Wiesbaden Open, Germany | W100 | Clay | (Kazakhstan) Zhibek Kulambayeva | (Czech Republic) Jesika Malečková (Czech Republic) Miriam Škoch | 4–6, 6–3, [11–9] |
| Loss | 10–7 | May 2025 | Internazionali di Brescia, Italy | W75 | Clay | (Czech Republic) Gabriela Knutson | (Poland) Maja Chwalińska (Austria) Sinja Kraus | 0–6, 3–6 |
