= 2017 Canberra Tennis International =

- Date: 30 October–5 November
- Edition: 3rd
- Category: ATP Challenger Tour; ITF Women's Circuit
- Prize money: US$75,000 (men); US$60,000 (women)
- Surface: Hard
- Location: Canberra, Australia

Champions

Men's singles
- (Australia) Matthew Ebden

Women's singles
- (Australia) Olivia Rogowska

Men's doubles
- (Australia) Alex Bolt / (Australia) Bradley Mousley

Women's doubles
- (United States) Asia Muhammad / (Australia) Arina Rodionova
← 2016 ·	Canberra Tennis International	· 2018 →

The 2017 Canberra Tennis International was a professional tennis tournament played on outdoor hard courts. It was the third edition of the tournament and was part of the 2017 ATP Challenger Tour and the 2017 ITF Women's Circuit. It took place in Canberra, Australia, on 30 October–5 November 2017.

== Men's singles main draw entrants ==
=== Seeds ===
Country	Player	Rank^{1}	Seed
~~AUS~~	~~Jordan Thompson~~	~~77~~	~~1~~
JPN	Taro Daniel	104	2
AUS	Matthew Ebden	120	3
USA	Mitchell Krueger	184	4
USA	Evan King	209	5
USA	Noah Rubin	214	6
AUS	John Millman	218	7
AUS	Omar Jasika	245	8

- ^{1} Rankings as of 23 October 2017.

=== Other entrants ===
The following players received a wildcard into the singles main draw:

- (Australia) Blake Ellis
- (Australia) Jacob Grills
- (Australia) Benard Bruno Nkomba

The following player received entry into the singles main draw using a protected ranking:

- (Australia) Jason Kubler

The following player received entry into the singles main draw as a special exempt:

- (Australia) Blake Ellis

The following player received entry into the singles main draw as an alternate:

- (Australia) Omar Jasika

The following players received entry from the qualifying draw:

- (Australia) Matthew Barton
- (Australia) Gavin van Peperzeel
- (Australia) Dane Propoggia
- (Australia) Calum Puttergill

The following players received entry as lucky losers:

- (Australia) Benjamin Mitchell
- (Australia) Christopher O'Connell

== Women's singles main draw entrants ==
=== Seeds ===
Country	Player	Rank^{1}	Seed
AUS	Arina Rodionova	116	1
AUS	Lizette Cabrera	134	2
USA	Asia Muhammad	136	3
AUS	Destanee Aiava	164	4
SLO	Tamara Zidanšek	187	5
AUS	Olivia Rogowska	224	6
AUS	Isabelle Wallace	281	7
JPN	Erika Sema	294	8

- ^{1} Rankings as of 23 October 2017.

=== Other entrants ===
The following players received a wildcard into the singles main draw:

- (Australia) Alexandra Bozovic
- (Australia) Belinda Woolcock

The following players received entry from the qualifying draw:

- (Australia) Priscilla Hon
- (Australia) Masa Jovanovic
- (Australia) Kaylah McPhee
- (Japan) Ramu Ueda

== Champions ==
=== Men's singles ===
- (Australia) Matthew Ebden def. (Japan) Taro Daniel 7–6^{(7–4)}, 6–4.

=== Women's singles ===
- (Australia) Olivia Rogowska def. (Australia) Destanee Aiava, 6–1, 6–2

=== Men's doubles ===
- (Australia) Alex Bolt / (Australia) Bradley Mousley def. (Australia) Luke Saville / (Australia) Andrew Whittington 6–3, 6–2.

=== Women's doubles ===
- (United States) Asia Muhammad / (Australia) Arina Rodionova def. (Australia) Jessica Moore / (Australia) Ellen Perez, 6–4, 6–4
