= 2023 Canberra Tennis International =

- Date: 2–7 January
- Edition: 5th
- Category: ATP Challenger Tour; ITF Women's World Tennis Tour
- Surface: Hard
- Location: Canberra, Australia

Champions

Men's singles
- (Hungary) Márton Fucsovics

Women's singles
- (United Kingdom) Katie Boulter

Men's doubles
- (Sweden) André Göransson / (Japan) Ben McLachlan

Women's doubles
- Irina Khromacheva / Anastasia Tikhonova
- Canberra Tennis International

The 2023 Canberra International, known as P2 Advisory Canberra International, was a professional tennis tournament played on outdoor hardcourts. It was the fifth edition of the tournament and was part of the 2023 ATP Challenger Tour and the 2023 ITF Women's World Tennis Tour. It took place in Canberra, Australia between 2 and 7 January 2023.

== Men's singles main draw entrants ==
=== Seeds ===
| Country | Player | Rank^{1} | Seed |
|---|---|---|---|
| HUN | Márton Fucsovics | 87 | 1 |
| ECU | Emilio Gómez | 104 | 2 |
| FRA | Hugo Gaston | 108 | 3 |
| SVK | Norbert Gombos | 114 | 4 |
| | Pavel Kotov | 117 | 5 |
| ITA | Francesco Passaro | 119 | 6 |
| AUT | Jurij Rodionov | 122 | 7 |
| ARG | Federico Delbonis | 125 | 8 |

- ^{1} Rankings as of 26 December 2022.

=== Other entrants ===
The following players received a wildcard into the singles main draw:

- (Australia) James McCabe
- (Australia) Marc Polmans
- (Australia) Dane Sweeny

The following player received entry into the singles main draw using a protected ranking:

- (United States) Bradley Klahn

The following players received entry from the qualifying draw:

- (United Kingdom) Liam Broady
- (France) Enzo Couacaud
- (United States) Mitchell Krueger
- (Italy) Francesco Maestrelli
- (France) Alexandre Müller
- (United States) Emilio Nava

== Women's singles main draw entrants ==
=== Seeds ===
| Country | Player | Rank^{1} | Seed |
|---|---|---|---|
| UKR | Kateryna Baindl | 99 | 1 |
| SVK | Anna Karolína Schmiedlová | 103 | 2 |
| FRA | Diane Parry | 112 | 3 |
| SUI | Simona Waltert | 125 | 4 |
| GER | Eva Lys | 127 | 5 |
| GBR | Jodie Burrage | 131 | 6 |
| | Erika Andreeva | 135 | 7 |
| GBR | Katie Boulter | 136 | 8 |

- ^{1} Rankings as of 26 December 2022.

=== Other entrants ===
The following players received a wildcard into the singles main draw:

- (Australia) Talia Gibson
- (Australia) Petra Hule
- (Australia) Astra Sharma

The following player received entry into the singles main draw using a protected ranking:

- (Serbia) Olga Danilović

The following players received entry from the qualifying draw:

- Darya Astakhova
- Anastasia Gasanova
- (Japan) Mai Hontama
- (United States) Ashlyn Krueger
- (Netherlands) Suzan Lamens
- (United Kingdom) Lily Miyazaki
- Oksana Selekhmeteva
- Anastasia Zakharova

The following players received entry as lucky losers:

- (United States) Robin Anderson
- (Netherlands) Arianne Hartono

== Champions ==
=== Men's singles ===
- (Hungary) Márton Fucsovics def. (Switzerland) Leandro Riedi 7–5, 6–4.

=== Women's singles ===
- (United Kingdom) Katie Boulter def. (United Kingdom) Jodie Burrage 3–6, 6–3, 6–2

=== Men's doubles ===
- (Sweden) André Göransson / (Japan) Ben McLachlan def. (Australia) Andrew Harris / (Australia) John-Patrick Smith 6–3, 5–7, [10–5].

=== Women's doubles ===
- Irina Khromacheva / Anastasia Tikhonova def. (United States) Robin Anderson / (United States) Hailey Baptiste 6–4, 7–5
