= 2018 Canberra Tennis International – Men's doubles =

Men's doubles
- 2018 Canberra Tennis International

Final
- Champions: (United Kingdom) Evan Hoyt (Chinese Taipei) Wu Tung-lin
- Runners-up: (Australia) Jeremy Beale (Australia) Thomas Fancutt
- Score: 7–6^{(7–5)}, 5–7, [10–8]

Events
Singles	men	women
Doubles	men	women
← 2017 ·	Canberra Tennis International	· 2023 →

Alex Bolt and Bradley Mousley were the defending champions but only Mousley chose to defend his title, partnering Akira Santillan. Mousley lost in the quarterfinals to Evan Hoyt and Wu Tung-lin.

Hoyt and Wu won the title after defeating Jeremy Beale and Thomas Fancutt 7–6^{(7–5)}, 5–7, [10–8] in the final.

== Seeds ==
1. (Australia) Max Purcell / (Australia) Luke Saville (semifinals)
2. (Australia) Bradley Mousley / (Australia) Akira Santillan (quarterfinals)
3. (Zimbabwe) Benjamin Lock / (New Zealand) Rubin Statham (quarterfinals)
4. (United Kingdom) Brydan Klein / (Australia) Scott Puodziunas (first round)

== Draw ==
=== Key ===
- Q = Qualifier
- WC = Wild card
- LL = Lucky loser
- Alt = Alternate
- ITF = ITF entry
- PR = Protected ranking
- SR = Special ranking
- SE = Special exempt
- JE = Junior exempt
- JR = Junior Accelerator Programme entrant
- CO = College Accelerator Programme entrant
- NG = Next Gen Accelerator Program entrant
- w/o = Walkover
- r = Retired
- d = Defaulted

First round
1	(Australia) M Purcell (Australia) L Saville	6	5	[10]
Alt	(Australia) Edward Bourchier (Australia) H Bourchier	4	7	[4]
(Italy) Alessandro Petrone (Italy) Francesco Vilardo	6^{0}	6^{6}
(France) S Doumbia (France) F Reboul	7^{7}	7^{8}
3	(Zimbabwe) B Lock (New Zealand) R Statham	6	6
(Australia) A Taylor (Australia) J Taylor	4	4
(Australia) J Beale (Australia) T Fancutt	7^{9}	3	[10]
WC	(Australia) J Frawley (Australia) Jacob Grills	6^{7}	6	[7]
(Spain) N Kuhn (Belgium) Y Mertens	6	5	[14]
WC	(Australia) A Harris (Australia) A Vukic	4	7	[16]
(Japan) H Moriya (Japan) Yo Watanuki	3	7^{7}	[10]
4	(United Kingdom) B Klein (Australia) S Puodziunas	6	6^{5}	[8]
(Australia) M Banes (Australia) B Ellis	2	6	[9]
(United Kingdom) E Hoyt (Chinese Taipei) T-l Wu	6	4	[11]
WC	(Australia) Michael Look (Australia) Lucas Vuradin	4	2
2	(Australia) B Mousley (Australia) A Santillan	6	6

Quarterfinals
1	(Australia) M Purcell (Australia) L Saville	7	6^{10}	[10]
(France) S Doumbia (France) F Reboul	5	7^{12}	[7]
3	(Zimbabwe) B Lock (New Zealand) R Statham	4	6	[9]
(Australia) J Beale (Australia) T Fancutt	6	4	[11]
WC	(Australia) A Harris (Australia) A Vukic	5	6	[2]
(Japan) H Moriya (Japan) Yo Watanuki	7	4	[10]
(United Kingdom) E Hoyt (Chinese Taipei) T-l Wu	6	6
2	(Australia) B Mousley (Australia) A Santillan	3	2

Semifinals
1	(Australia) M Purcell (Australia) L Saville	2	4
(Australia) J Beale (Australia) T Fancutt	6	6
(Japan) H Moriya (Japan) Yo Watanuki	6^{2}	6	[2]
(United Kingdom) E Hoyt (Chinese Taipei) T-l Wu	7^{7}	4	[10]

Final
(Australia) J Beale (Australia) T Fancutt	6^{5}	7	[8]
(United Kingdom) E Hoyt (Chinese Taipei) T-l Wu	7^{7}	5	[10]
