= 2026 Canberra Tennis International =

- Date: 5 – 10 January
- Edition: 8th (men); 9th (women)
- Category: ATP Challenger 125; WTA 125
- Draw: 32S/16D
- Prize money: $225,000
- Surface: Hard
- Location: Canberra, Australia

Champions

Men's singles
- (Belgium) Alexander Blockx

Women's singles
- (Chinese Taipei) Joanna Garland

Men's doubles
- (United States) Mac Kiger / (United States) Reese Stalder

Women's doubles
- Maria Kozyreva / Iryna Shymanovich
- Canberra Tennis International

The 2026 Workday Canberra International was a professional tennis tournament played on outdoor hardcourts. It was the eighth edition of the men's tournament, which was part of the 2026 ATP Challenger 125, and the ninth edition of the women's tournament, which was part of the 2026 WTA 125 tournaments. It took place at the Canberra Tennis Centre in Canberra, Australia between 5 and 10 January 2026.

== Men's singles main draw entrants ==
=== Seeds ===
Country	Player	Rank^{1}	Seed
CZE	Vít Kopřiva	103	1
ITA	Luca Nardi	107	2
JPN	Yoshihito Nishioka	110	3
CHI	Tomás Barrios Vera	111	4
USA	Brandon Holt	112	5
BEL	Alexander Blockx	117	6
DEN	Elmer Møller	120	7
SRB	Dušan Lajović	121	8

- ^{1} Rankings as of 29 December 2025

=== Other entrants ===
The following players received a wildcard into the singles main draw:

- (Australia) James McCabe
- (Australia) Philip Sekulic
- (Australia) Edward Winter

The following player received entry into the singles main draw through the Next Gen Accelerator programme:

- (Germany) Justin Engel

The following players received entry from the qualifying draw:

- (United States) Murphy Cassone
- (Spain) Rafael Jódar
- (Colombia) Nicolás Mejía
- (Austria) Lukas Neumayer
- (United Kingdom) Jack Pinnington Jones
- (Luxembourg) Chris Rodesch

== Women's singles main draw entrants ==
=== Seeds ===
Country	Player	Rank^{1}	Seed
SUI	Simona Waltert	87	1
JPN	Moyuka Uchijima	94	2
UZB	Polina Kudermetova	104	3
ITA	Lucia Bronzetti	108	4
EGY	Mayar Sherif	109	5
FRA	Diane Parry	124	6
GER	Tamara Korpatsch	125	7
BEL	Hanne Vandewinkel	126	8

- ^{1} Rankings as of 29 December 2025.

=== Other entrants ===
The following players received a wildcard into the singles main draw:

- (Australia) Destanee Aiava
- (Australia) Tahlia Kokkinis
- (Australia) Elena Micic
- (Australia) Tina Smith

The following players received entry using a protected ranking:

- (United States) Madison Brengle
- Alina Korneeva

The following players received entry from the qualifying draw:

- (Georgia (country)) Ekaterine Gorgodze
- Polina Iatcenko
- (United States) Elvina Kalieva
- (Serbia) Teodora Kostović
- (Chinese Taipei) Liang En-shuo
- Tatiana Prozorova
- (Japan) Himeno Sakatsume
- (Slovenia) Tamara Zidanšek

=== Withdrawals ===
Before the tournament

- (China) Bai Zhuoxuan → replaced by (Ukraine) Daria Snigur

=== Retirement ===
- Polina Iatcenko (right thigh injury)

== Women's doubles main-draw entrants ==
=== Seeds ===
Country	Player	Country	Player	Rank^{1}	Seed
USA	Quinn Gleason		Elena Pridankina	135	1
	Maria Kozyreva		Iryna Shymanovich	144	2
HKG	Eudice Chong	TPE	Liang En-shuo	187	3
JPN	Momoko Kobori	JPN	Ayano Shimizu	211	4

- ^{1} Rankings are as of 29 December 2025.

=== Other entrants ===
The following pair received a wildcard into the doubles main draw:

- (Australia) Roisin Gilheany / (Australia) Charlotte Kempenaers-Pocz

The following pair used a protected ranking to enter the doubles main draw:

- (Japan) Ena Shibahara / Vera Zvonareva

=== Withdrawals ===
- (Serbia) Lola Radivojević / (Belgium) Hanne Vandewinkel → replaced by (Australia) Destanee Aiava / (Australia) Gabriella Da Silva-Fick

== Champions ==
=== Men's singles ===
- (Belgium) Alexander Blockx def. (Spain) Rafael Jódar 6–4, 6–4.

=== Women's singles ===
- (Chinese Taipei) Joanna Garland def. (Uzbekistan) Polina Kudermetova, 6–4, 6–2

=== Men's doubles ===
- (United States) Mac Kiger / (United States) Reese Stalder def. (Australia) Blake Bayldon / (Australia) Patrick Harper 7–6^{(7–3)}, 6–3.

=== Women's doubles ===
- Maria Kozyreva / Iryna Shymanovich def. (Japan) Ena Shibahara / Vera Zvonareva, 6–7^{(9–11)}, 7–5, [10–8]
