= 2016 Canberra Tennis International – Women's singles =

Women's singles
- 2016 Canberra Tennis International

Final
- Champion: (Japan) Risa Ozaki
- Runner-up: (Italy) Georgia Brescia
- Score: 6–4, 6–4

Events
Singles	men	women
Doubles	men	women
← 2015 ·	Canberra Tennis International	· 2017 →

Asia Muhammad was the defending champion, but lost to Varatchaya Wongteanchai in the first round.

Risa Ozaki won the title, defeating Georgia Brescia in the final, 6–4, 6–4.

== Seeds ==
1. (Japan) Risa Ozaki (champion)
2. (Japan) Hiroko Kuwata (second round)
3. (United States) Asia Muhammad (first round)
4. (Israel) Julia Glushko (second round)
5. (Australia) Arina Rodionova (quarterfinals)
6. (Japan) Eri Hozumi (quarterfinals)
7. (Croatia) Jana Fett (semifinals)
8. (Japan) Shuko Aoyama (first round)

== Main draw ==
=== Key ===
- Q = Qualifier
- WC = Wild card
- LL = Lucky loser
- Alt = Alternate
- SE = Special exempt
- PR = Protected ranking
- ITF = ITF entry
- JE = Junior exempt
- w/o = Walkover
- r = Retired
- d = Defaulted
- SR = Special ranking

=== Finals ===
Semifinals
1	(Japan) Risa Ozaki	3	6	6
(United States) Jennifer Elie	6	1	0
7	(Croatia) Jana Fett	6^{3}	2
Q	(Italy) Georgia Brescia	7^{7}	6

Final
1	(Japan) Risa Ozaki	6	6
Q	(Italy) Georgia Brescia	4	4

=== Top half ===
First round
1	(Japan) R Ozaki	6	6
Q	(Australia) A Myers	4	3
WC	(Papua New Guinea) A Tere-Apisah	6	2	1
(Australia) O Rogowska	0	6	6
(Australia) O Tjandramulia	7	6
Q	(Brazil) G Cé	5	3
(Australia) A Bai	2	4
5	(Australia) Ar Rodionova	6	6
4	(Israel) J Glushko	6	6
WC	(Australia) S Mendez	3	3
(United States) J Elie	6	6
(Japan) A Okuno	0	2
(Thailand) N Lertcheewakarn	6	7
Q	(Australia) V Rajicic	3	5
(United Kingdom) K Dunne	2	6	4
6	(Japan) E Hozumi	6	4	6

Second round
1	(Japan) R Ozaki	6	6
(Australia) O Rogowska	4	2
(Australia) O Tjandramulia	2	5
5	(Australia) Ar Rodionova	6	7
4	(Israel) J Glushko	6^{3}	2
(United States) J Elie	7^{7}	6
(Thailand) N Lertcheewakarn	6^{4}	4
6	(Japan) E Hozumi	7^{7}	6

Quarterfinals
1	(Japan) R Ozaki	6	6
5	(Australia) Ar Rodionova	4	3
(United States) J Elie	7	6
6	(Japan) E Hozumi	5	3

Semifinals
1	(Japan) R Ozaki	3	6	6
(United States) J Elie	6	1	0

=== Bottom half ===
First round
7	(Croatia) J Fett	6	6^{4}	6
(Australia) L Cabrera	3	7^{7}	4
WC	(Australia) S Peers	2	6	6^{3}
(Australia) D Aiava	6	2	7^{7}
(Japan) Y Tanaka	6^{3}	6	6
(Australia) S Sanders	7^{7}	1	4
(Thailand) V Wongteanchai	6^{0}	7	6
3	(United States) A Muhammad	7^{7}	5	4
8	(Japan) S Aoyama	3	0
(Australia) T Patterson	6	6
WC	(Australia) S Tomic	3	4
(Slovakia) Z Zlochová	6	6
(Poland) K Kawa	4	1
Q	(Italy) G Brescia	6	6
(Australia) J Moore	7^{7}	3	3
2	(Japan) H Kuwata	6^{5}	6	6

Second round
7	(Croatia) J Fett	6	4	6
(Australia) D Aiava	2	6	1
(Japan) Y Tanaka	6	7
(Thailand) V Wongteanchai	2	5
(Australia) T Patterson	6	6
(Slovakia) Z Zlochová	4	4
Q	(Italy) G Brescia	6	6
2	(Japan) H Kuwata	2	0

Quarterfinals
7	(Croatia) J Fett	6	6
(Japan) Y Tanaka	2	1
(Australia) T Patterson	1	2
Q	(Italy) G Brescia	6	6

Semifinals
7	(Croatia) J Fett	6^{3}	2
Q	(Italy) G Brescia	7^{7}	6
