= 2026 Canberra Tennis International – Women's singles =

Women's singles
- 2026 Canberra Tennis International

Final
- Champion: (Chinese Taipei) Joanna Garland
- Runner-up: (Uzbekistan) Polina Kudermetova
- Score: 6–4, 6–2

Events
| Singles | men | women |
| Doubles | men | women |
- Canberra Tennis International

Aoi Ito was the reigning champion, but did not participate this year.

Joanna Garland won the title, defeating Polina Kudermetova 6–4, 6–2 in the final.

== Seeds ==
1. (Switzerland) Simona Waltert (quarterfinals)
2. (Japan) Moyuka Uchijima (second round)
3. (Uzbekistan) Polina Kudermetova (final)
4. (Italy) Lucia Bronzetti (first round)
5. (Egypt) Mayar Sherif (second round)
6. (France) Diane Parry (first round)
7. (Germany) Tamara Korpatsch (first round)
8. (Belgium) Hanne Vandewinkel (first round)

== Draw ==
Key

- Q = Qualifier
- WC = Wild card
- LL = Lucky loser
- Alt = Alternate
- ITF = ITF entry
- PR = Protected ranking
- SR = Special ranking
- SE = Special exempt
- JE = Junior exempt
- JR = Junior Accelerator Programme entrant
- CO = College Accelerator Programme entrant
- NG = Next Gen Accelerator Program entrant
- w/o = Walkover
- r = Retired
- d = Defaulted

=== Finals ===
Semifinals
(Ukraine) Daria Snigur | 6^{3} | 3
(Chinese Taipei) Joanna Garland | 7^{7} | 6
3 | (Uzbekistan) Polina Kudermetova | 7 | 6
Q | (Japan) Himeno Sakatsume | 5 | 2

Final
(Chinese Taipei) Joanna Garland | 6 | 6
3 | (Uzbekistan) Polina Kudermetova | 4 | 2

=== Top half ===
First round
1 | (Switzerland) S Waltert | 6^{2} | 7^{7} | 6
(Czech Republic) D Šalková | 7^{7} | 6^{0} | 2
(Canada) M Stakusic | 3 | 2
(Czech Republic) D Vidmanova | 6 | 6
Q | (Chinese Taipei) E-s Liang | 7^{7} | 6
(Italy) L Stefanini | 6^{5} | 1
(Ukraine) D Snigur | 6 | 6
7 | (Germany) T Korpatsch | 4 | 0
4 | (Italy) L Bronzetti | 2 | 7^{7} | 3
Q | (Slovenia) T Zidanšek | 6 | 6^{4} | 6
(Thailand) L Tararudee | 6 | 6
WC | (Australia) T Smith | 2 | 2
Q | P Iatcenko | 6^{5} | 6 | 6
WC | (Australia) D Aiava | 7^{7} | 3 | 3
(Chinese Taipei) J Garland | 5 | 6 | 6
6 | (France) D Parry | 7 | 4 | 2

Second round
1 | (Switzerland) S Waltert | 3 | 7 | 6
(Czech Republic) D Vidmanova | 6 | 5 | 3
Q | (Chinese Taipei) E-s Liang | 4 | 2
(Ukraine) D Snigur | 6 | 6
Q | (Slovenia) T Zidanšek | 7^{7} | 2 | 6
(Thailand) L Tararudee | 6^{5} | 6 | 3
Q | P Iatcenko | 3^{r}
(Chinese Taipei) J Garland | 3

Quarterfinals
1 | (Switzerland) S Waltert | 2 | 4
(Ukraine) D Snigur | 6 | 6
Q | (Slovenia) T Zidanšek | 2 | 4
(Chinese Taipei) J Garland | 6 | 6

Semifinals
(Ukraine) D Snigur | 6^{3} | 3
(Chinese Taipei) J Garland | 7^{7} | 6

=== Bottom half ===
First round
8 | (Belgium) H Vandewinkel | 3 | 4
(China) Y Yuan | 6 | 6
Q | T Prozorova | 6 | 6
(Czech Republic) N Bartůňková | 1 | 2
(Serbia) L Radivojević | 6 | 6
Q | (Serbia) T Kostović | 4 | 4
PR | A Korneeva | 2 | 3
3 | (Uzbekistan) P Kudermetova | 6 | 6
5 | (Egypt) M Sherif | 6 | 3 | 7
WC | (Australia) E Micic | 4 | 6 | 5
WC | (Australia) T Kokkinis | 5 | 2
Q | (Japan) H Sakatsume | 7 | 6
Q | (United States) E Kalieva | 2 | 7^{7} | 6^{3}
Q | (Georgia (country)) E Gorgodze | 6 | 6^{2} | 7^{7}
PR | (United States) M Brengle | 4 | 4
2 | (Japan) M Uchijima | 6 | 6

Second round
(China) Y Yuan | 6 | 6
Q | T Prozorova | 4 | 3
(Serbia) L Radivojević | 3 | 6^{1}
3 | (Uzbekistan) P Kudermetova | 6 | 7^{7}
5 | (Egypt) M Sherif | 3 | 6 | 3
Q | (Japan) H Sakatsume | 6 | 3 | 6
Q | (Georgia (country)) E Gorgodze | 6 | 6
2 | (Japan) M Uchijima | 4 | 1

Quarterfinals
(China) Y Yuan | 1 | 0
3 | (Uzbekistan) P Kudermetova | 6 | 6
Q | (Japan) H Sakatsume | 3 | 6 | 6
Q | (Georgia (country)) E Gorgodze | 6 | 2 | 0

Semifinals
3 | (Uzbekistan) P Kudermetova | 7 | 6
Q | (Japan) H Sakatsume | 5 | 2

== Qualifying ==
=== Seeds ===
1. Iryna Shymanovich (first round)
2. (Japan) Himeno Sakatsume (qualified)
3. (Slovenia) Tamara Zidanšek (qualified)
4. Polina Iatcenko (qualified)
5. (Serbia) Teodora Kostović (qualified)
6. (Georgia (country)) Ekaterine Gorgodze (qualified)
7. (Canada) Carson Branstine (first round)
8. (Spain) Guiomar Maristany (first round)
9. Tatiana Prozorova (qualified)
10. Elena Pridankina (qualifying competition)
11. (Japan) Ena Shibahara (qualifying competition)
12. (Netherlands) Anouk Koevermans (qualifying competition)
13. (France) Alice Ramé (first round)
14. (Romania) Miriam Bulgaru (qualifying competition)
15. (France) Manon Léonard (first round)
16. (United States) Elvina Kalieva (qualified)

=== Qualifiers ===
1. (Chinese Taipei) Liang En-shuo
2. (Japan) Himeno Sakatsume
3. (Slovenia) Tamara Zidanšek
4. Polina Iatcenko
5. (Serbia) Teodora Kostović
6. (Georgia (country)) Ekaterine Gorgodze
7. (United States) Elvina Kalieva
8. Tatiana Prozorova

=== Draw ===
==== First qualifier ====
First round
1 | Iryna Shymanovich | 6 | 3 | 1
(Chinese Taipei) Liang En-shuo | 4 | 6 | 6
(Japan) Mai Hontama | 1 | 6 | 6
15 | (France) Manon Léonard | 6 | 2 | 4

Qualifying competition
(Chinese Taipei) Liang En-shuo | 6 | 6
(Japan) Mai Hontama | 3 | 1

==== Second qualifier ====
First round
2 | (Japan) Himeno Sakatsume | 6 | 7
(United States) Carol Young Suh Lee | 2 | 5
(United States) Mary Stoiana | 7^{8} | 4 | 6
13 | (France) Alice Ramé | 6^{6} | 6 | 3

Qualifying competition
2 | (Japan) Himeno Sakatsume | 7 | 6
(United States) Mary Stoiana | 5 | 2

==== Third qualifier ====
First round
3 | (Slovenia) Tamara Zidanšek | 6 | 6
(Burundi) Sada Nahimana | 2 | 4
WC | (Australia) Renee Alame | 1 | 4
14 | (Romania) Miriam Bulgaru | 6 | 6

Qualifying competition
3 | (Slovenia) Tamara Zidanšek | 6 | 6
14 | (Romania) Miriam Bulgaru | 2 | 3

==== Fourth qualifier ====
First round
4 | Polina Iatcenko | 6 | 6
(China) Wei Sijia | 3 | 3
WC | (Australia) Stefani Webb | 6^{5} | 1
11 | (Japan) Ena Shibahara | 7^{7} | 6

Qualifying competition
4 | Polina Iatcenko | 4 | 7^{7} | 6
11 | (Japan) Ena Shibahara | 6 | 6^{1} | 2

==== Fifth qualifier ====
First round
5 | (Serbia) Teodora Kostović | 6 | 6
(Italy) Camilla Rosatello | 3 | 1
WC | (Australia) Giselle Isabell Guillen | 3 | 2
10 | Elena Pridankina | 6 | 6

Qualifying competition
5 | (Serbia) Teodora Kostović | 7 | 6^{6} | 6
10 | Elena Pridankina | 5 | 7^{8} | 2

==== Sixth qualifier ====
First round
6 | (Georgia (country)) Ekaterine Gorgodze | 6 | 6
(France) Séléna Janicijevic | 3 | 3
WC | (Australia) Sarah Rokusek | 0 | 1
12 | (Netherlands) Anouk Koevermans | 6 | 6

Qualifying competition
6 | (Georgia (country)) Ekaterine Gorgodze | 7 | 4 | 6
12 | (Netherlands) Anouk Koevermans | 5 | 6 | 3

==== Seventh qualifier ====
First round
7 | (Canada) Carson Branstine | 1 | 2
PR | Vera Zvonareva | 6 | 6
(Spain) Nuria Párrizas Díaz | 3 | 2
16 | (United States) Elvina Kalieva | 6 | 6

Qualifying competition
PR | Vera Zvonareva | 7 | 2 | 2
16 | (United States) Elvina Kalieva | 5 | 6 | 6

==== Eighth qualifier ====
First round
8 | (Spain) Guiomar Maristany | 2 | 6^{1}
Anastasia Gasanova | 6 | 7^{7}
(Japan) Ayano Shimizu | 5 | 1
9 | Tatiana Prozorova | 7 | 6

Qualifying competition
Anastasia Gasanova | 1 | 4
9 | Tatiana Prozorova | 6 | 6
