= 2017 Canberra Tennis International – Women's singles =

Women's singles
- 2017 Canberra Tennis International

Final
- Champion: (Australia) Olivia Rogowska
- Runner-up: (Australia) Destanee Aiava
- Score: 6–1, 6–2

Events
Singles	men	women
Doubles	men	women
← 2016 ·	Canberra Tennis International	· 2018 →

Risa Ozaki was the defending champion, but chose to participate in Toronto instead.

Olivia Rogowska won the title, defeating Destanee Aiava in the final, 6–1, 6–2.

== Seeds ==
1. (Australia) Arina Rodionova (second round)
2. (Australia) Lizette Cabrera (quarterfinals)
3. (United States) Asia Muhammad (first round)
4. (Australia) Destanee Aiava (final)
5. (Slovenia) Tamara Zidanšek (quarterfinals)
6. (Australia) Olivia Rogowska (champion)
7. (Australia) Isabelle Wallace (first round)
8. (Japan) Erika Sema (second round)

== Draw ==
=== Key ===
- Q = Qualifier
- WC = Wild card
- LL = Lucky loser
- Alt = Alternate
- SE = Special exempt
- PR = Protected ranking
- ITF = ITF entry
- JE = Junior exempt
- w/o = Walkover
- r = Retired
- d = Defaulted
- SR = Special ranking

=== Finals ===
Semifinals
(Australia) Alison Bai	3	5
4	(Australia) Destanee Aiava	6	7
6	(Australia) Olivia Rogowska	1	6	6
(Israel) Julia Glushko	6	3	0

Final
4	(Australia) Destanee Aiava	1	2
6	(Australia) Olivia Rogowska	6	6

=== Top half ===
First round
1	(Australia) Ar Rodionova	6	6
Q	(Australia) P Hon	2	2
Q	(Japan) R Ueda	0	0
(Australia) A Bai	6	6
Q	(Australia) K McPhee	6	3	6
(Australia) M Inglis	4	6	2
(United States) J Elie	7^{7}	7^{7}
7	(Australia) I Wallace	6^{5}	6^{3}
4	(Australia) D Aiava	3	6	6
Q	(Australia) M Jovanovic	6	3	3
(United States) YK Chiang	2	1
WC	(Australia) B Woolcock	6	6
(Australia) O Tjandramulia	6	6
(Australia) K Birrell	4	0
(Australia) A Sharma	2	4
5	(Slovenia) T Zidanšek	6	6

Second round
1	(Australia) Ar Rodionova	6^{5}	6	4
(Australia) A Bai	7^{7}	3	6
Q	(Australia) K McPhee	1	6	6
(United States) J Elie	6	4	4
4	(Australia) D Aiava	6	6
WC	(Australia) B Woolcock	1	3
(Australia) O Tjandramulia	6^{6}	4
5	(Slovenia) T Zidanšek	7^{8}	6

Quarterfinals
(Australia) A Bai	3	6	6
Q	(Australia) K McPhee	6	3	4
4	(Australia) D Aiava	6	6
5	(Slovenia) T Zidanšek	2	2

Semifinals
(Australia) A Bai	3	5
4	(Australia) D Aiava	6	7

=== Bottom half ===
First round
6	(Australia) O Rogowska	4	6	6
(Japan) M Minokoshi	6	1	3
(France) A Lim	5	6	6
(Australia) Z Hives	7	2	3
(Papua New Guinea) A Tere-Apisah	3	6	6
(Australia) S Sanders	6	1	2
(Australia) E Perez	6	6^{7}	6
3	(United States) A Muhammad	4	7^{9}	1
8	(Japan) E Sema	2	6	6
(Australia) N Bains	6	1	2
(Australia) S Tomic	4	3
(Israel) J Glushko	6	6
(Australia) J Moore	5	1
WC	(Australia) A Bozovic	7	6
(Australia) T Patterson	2	4
2	(Australia) L Cabrera	6	6

Second round
6	(Australia) O Rogowska	6	6
(France) A Lim	4	1
(Papua New Guinea) A Tere-Apisah	3	6	7^{8}
(Australia) E Perez	6	0	6^{6}
8	(Japan) E Sema	6^{5}	6	4
(Israel) J Glushko	7^{7}	2	6
WC	(Australia) A Bozovic	7^{7}	4	3
2	(Australia) L Cabrera	6^{3}	6	6

Quarterfinals
6	(Australia) O Rogowska	7	7
(Papua New Guinea) A Tere-Apisah	5	5
(Israel) J Glushko	6	7
2	(Australia) L Cabrera	4	5

Semifinals
6	(Australia) O Rogowska	1	6	6
(Israel) J Glushko	6	3	0
