= 2017 Canberra Tennis International – Women's doubles =

Women's doubles
- 2017 Canberra Tennis International

Final
- Champion: (United States) Asia Muhammad (Australia) Arina Rodionova
- Runner-up: (Australia) Jessica Moore (Australia) Ellen Perez
- Score: 6–4, 6–4

Events
Singles	men	women
Doubles	men	women
← 2016 ·	Canberra Tennis International	· 2018 →

Jessica Moore and Storm Sanders were the defending champions, but both players chose to participate with different partners. Sanders played alongside Gabriella Da Silva-Fick, but lost in the first round to Destanee Aiava and Alicia Smith. Moore played alongside Ellen Perez, however they lost in the final to Asia Muhammad and Arina Rodionova, 6–4, 6–4.

== Seeds ==
1. (United States) Asia Muhammad / (Australia) Arina Rodionova (champions)
2. (Israel) Julia Glushko / (Australia) Priscilla Hon (semifinals)
3. (Australia) Jessica Moore / (Australia) Ellen Perez (final)
4. (Australia) Naiktha Bains / (Papua New Guinea) Abigail Tere-Apisah (semifinals)

== Draw ==
=== Key ===
- Q = Qualifier
- WC = Wild card
- LL = Lucky loser
- Alt = Alternate
- SE = Special exempt
- PR = Protected ranking
- ITF = ITF entry
- JE = Junior exempt
- w/o = Walkover
- r = Retired
- d = Defaulted
- SR = Special ranking

First round
1	(United States) A Muhammad (Australia) Ar Rodionova	6	6
(Australia) M Jovanovic (Australia) A Walters	3	1
(Australia) T Patterson (Australia) O Rogowska	2	2
(Australia) L Cabrera (Australia) O Tjandramulia	6	6
4	(Australia) N Bains (Papua New Guinea) A Tere-Apisah	6	6^{6}	[10]
(Australia) A Sharma (Australia) B Woolcock	3	7^{8}	[6]
(Australia) K Birrell (France) A Lim	3	4
(Australia) G Lorbergs (Australia) I Wallace	6	6
(Australia) G Da Silva-Fick (Australia) S Sanders	6	2	[9]
(Australia) D Aiava (Australia) A Smith	4	6	[11]
Q	(Australia) A Parnaby (Australia) S Tomic	2	2
3	(Australia) J Moore (Australia) E Perez	6	6
Q	(Australia) A Bozovic (Australia) M Inglis	5	7^{7}	[7]
(United States) YK Chiang (Japan) M Minokoshi	7	6^{4}	[10]
(Australia) A Bai (Australia) Z Hives	3	3
2	(Israel) J Glushko (Australia) P Hon	6	6

Quarterfinals
1	(United States) A Muhammad (Australia) Ar Rodionova	6^{5}	6	[10]
(Australia) L Cabrera (Australia) O Tjandramulia	7^{7}	2	[7]
4	(Australia) N Bains (Papua New Guinea) A Tere-Apisah	6	6
(Australia) G Lorbergs (Australia) I Wallace	1	2
(Australia) D Aiava (Australia) A Smith	2	2
3	(Australia) J Moore (Australia) E Perez	6	6
(United States) YK Chiang (Japan) M Minokoshi	5	5
2	(Israel) J Glushko (Australia) P Hon	7	7

Semifinals
1	(United States) A Muhammad (Australia) Ar Rodionova	6	6
4	(Australia) N Bains (Papua New Guinea) A Tere-Apisah	2	4
3	(Australia) J Moore (Australia) E Perez	6	3	[10]
2	(Israel) J Glushko (Australia) P Hon	3	6	[6]

Final
1	(United States) A Muhammad (Australia) Ar Rodionova	6	6
3	(Australia) J Moore (Australia) E Perez	4	4
