= 2023 Canberra Tennis International – Men's doubles =

Men's doubles
- 2023 Canberra Tennis International

Final
- Champions: (Sweden) André Göransson (Japan) Ben McLachlan
- Runners-up: (Australia) Andrew Harris (Australia) John-Patrick Smith
- Score: 6–3, 5–7, [10–5]

Events
Singles	men	women
Doubles	men	women
← 2018 ·	Canberra Tennis International	· 2024 →

Evan Hoyt and Wu Tung-lin were the defending champions but chose not to defend their title.

André Göransson and Ben McLachlan won the title after defeating Andrew Harris and John-Patrick Smith 6–3, 5–7, [10–5] in the final.

== Seeds ==
1. (Sweden) André Göransson / (Japan) Ben McLachlan (champions)
2. (Australia) Andrew Harris / (Australia) John-Patrick Smith (final)
3. (United States) Alex Lawson / (New Zealand) Artem Sitak (first round)
4. (Australia) Tristan Schoolkate / (Australia) Dane Sweeny (semifinals)

== Draw ==
=== Key ===
- Q = Qualifier
- WC = Wild card
- LL = Lucky loser
- Alt = Alternate
- SE = Special exempt
- PR = Protected ranking
- ITF = ITF entry
- JE = Junior exempt
- w/o = Walkover
- r = Retired
- d = Defaulted
- SR = Special ranking

First round
1	(Sweden) A Göransson (Japan) B McLachlan	6	6
PR	(United States) B Klahn (United States) M Krueger	4	2
(Italy) M Arnaldi (Italy) F Passaro	7^{7}	4	[10]
WC	(Australia) J Beale (Australia) J Frawley	6^{3}	6	[7]
3	(United States) A Lawson (New Zealand) A Sitak	6^{3}	3
(France) H Gaston (France) L Van Assche	7^{7}	6
(Switzerland) A Bellier (France) A Müller	1	0
(Netherlands) G Brouwer (Switzerland) L Riedi	6	6
(France) E Furness; P Kotov	3	4
Alt	(Ukraine) O Krutykh (Italy) A Pellegrino	6	6
(Argentina) F Delbonis (Chile) N Jarry	4	6	[3]
4	(Australia) T Schoolkate (Australia) D Sweeny	6	2	[10]
PR	(Australia) A Bolt (Australia) L Saville	w/o
(United Kingdom) L Broady (France) E Couacaud
(Portugal) G Elias (Ecuador) E Gómez	2	2
2	(Australia) A Harris (Australia) J-P Smith	6	6

Quarterfinals
1	(Sweden) A Göransson (Japan) B McLachlan	w/o
(Italy) M Arnaldi (Italy) F Passaro
(France) H Gaston (France) L Van Assche	4	5
(Netherlands) G Brouwer (Switzerland) L Riedi	6	7
Alt	(Ukraine) O Krutykh (Italy) A Pellegrino	3	4
4	(Australia) T Schoolkate (Australia) D Sweeny	6	6
PR	(Australia) A Bolt (Australia) L Saville	4	4
2	(Australia) A Harris (Australia) J-P Smith	6	6

Semifinals
1	(Sweden) A Göransson (Japan) B McLachlan	7^{7}	6
(Netherlands) G Brouwer (Switzerland) L Riedi	6^{4}	4
4	(Australia) T Schoolkate (Australia) D Sweeny	4	6	[11]
2	(Australia) A Harris (Australia) J-P Smith	6	4	[13]

Final
1	(Sweden) A Göransson (Japan) B McLachlan	6	5	[10]
2	(Australia) A Harris (Australia) J-P Smith	3	7	[5]
