= 2018 Canberra Tennis International – Men's singles =

Sports championship

Men's singles
- 2018 Canberra Tennis International

Final
- Champion: (Australia) Jordan Thompson
- Runner-up: (Spain) Nicola Kuhn
- Score: 6–1, 5–7, 6–4

Events
Singles	men	women
Doubles	men	women
- Canberra Tennis International

Matthew Ebden was the defending champion but chose not to defend his title.

Jordan Thompson won the title after defeating Nicola Kuhn 6–1, 5–7, 6–4 in the final.

== Seeds ==
1. (Australia) Jason Kubler (withdrew)
2. (Japan) Yoshihito Nishioka (semifinals)
3. (Australia) Jordan Thompson (champion)
4. (Australia) Alex Bolt (first round)
5. (Australia) Marc Polmans (first round)
6. (Japan) Hiroki Moriya (first round)
7. (Japan) Yosuke Watanuki (quarterfinals)
8. (Japan) Yasutaka Uchiyama (first round)

== Draw ==
Key

- Q = Qualifier
- WC = Wild card
- LL = Lucky loser
- Alt = Alternate
- ITF = ITF entry
- PR = Protected ranking
- SR = Special ranking
- SE = Special exempt
- JE = Junior exempt
- JR = Junior Accelerator Programme entrant
- CO = College Accelerator Programme entrant
- NG = Next Gen Accelerator Program entrant
- w/o = Walkover
- r = Retired
- d = Defaulted

=== Finals ===
Semifinals
(France) Maxime Janvier	4	5
3	(Australia) Jordan Thompson	6	7
(Spain) Nicola Kuhn	7^{7}	6
2	(Japan) Yoshihito Nishioka	6^{1}	4

Final
3	(Australia) Jordan Thompson	6	5	6
(Spain) Nicola Kuhn	1	7	4

=== Top half ===
First round
LL	(Chinese Taipei) T-l Wu	6	6
(Australia) M Banes	4	4
(France) M Janvier	6	6
Q	(United Kingdom) B Klein	4	3
Q	(Australia) T Fancutt	6	4	2
(France) S Doumbia	4	6	6
WC	(Australia) Jacob Grills	4	6	6
6	(Japan) H Moriya	6	4	1
3	(Australia) J Thompson	6	6
WC	(Australia) J Beale	2	2
(Belgium) Y Mertens	3	7^{7}	5
Q	(New Zealand) R Statham	6	6^{2}	7
WC	(Australia) L Saville	6	6
WC	(Australia) A Vukic	3	3
(Australia) B Ellis	7^{11}	6
8	(Japan) Y Uchiyama	6^{9}	3

Second round
LL	(Chinese Taipei) T-l Wu	7^{11}	5	3
(France) M Janvier	6^{9}	7	6
(France) S Doumbia	6^{6}	6	3
WC	(Australia) J Grills	7^{8}	3	6
3	(Australia) J Thompson	6	7^{7}
Q	(New Zealand) R Statham	2	6^{3}
WC	(Australia) L Saville	6^{4}	7^{7}	6^{5}
(Australia) B Ellis	7^{7}	6^{2}	7^{7}

Quarterfinals
(France) M Janvier	7^{7}	6
WC	(Australia) J Grills	6^{5}	4
3	(Australia) J Thompson	6	6
(Australia) B Ellis	3	1

Semifinals
(France) M Janvier	4	5
3	(Australia) J Thompson	6	7

=== Bottom half ===
First round
5	(Australia) M Polmans	6^{4}	6	6^{3}
(Australia) J Duckworth	7^{7}	4	7^{7}
(Australia) A Santillan	5	7^{7}	6
(Italy) Alessandro Petrone	7	6^{4}	1
(Spain) N Kuhn	6	6
Q	(Italy) Francesco Vilardo	1	3
(Australia) M Purcell	6	6^{3}	6
4	(Australia) A Bolt	1	7^{7}	4
7	(Japan) Yo Watanuki	7^{7}	6
(France) F Reboul	6^{5}	1
(Australia) A Harris	7^{7}	4	4
(Australia) B Mousley	6^{3}	6	0^{r}
(Zimbabwe) B Lock	1	5
(Germany) B Hassan	6	7
(Germany) S Fanselow	3	2
2	(Japan) Y Nishioka	6	6

Second round
(Australia) J Duckworth	4	6	3
(Australia) A Santillan	6	4	6
(Spain) N Kuhn	6	6
(Australia) M Purcell	2	4
7	(Japan) Yo Watanuki	7^{7}	6^{1}	6
(Australia) A Harris	6^{5}	7^{7}	0
(Germany) B Hassan	4	3
2	(Japan) Y Nishioka	6	6

Quarterfinals
(Australia) A Santillan	4	0^{r}
(Spain) N Kuhn	6	2
7	(Japan) Yo Watanuki	3	2
2	(Japan) Y Nishioka	6	6

Semifinals
(Spain) N Kuhn	7^{7}	6
2	(Japan) Y Nishioka	6^{1}	4
