= 2016 Canberra Tennis International =

- Date: 31 October–6 November
- Edition: 2nd
- Category: ATP Challenger Tour; ITF Women's Circuit
- Prize money: $50,000
- Surface: Hard
- Location: Canberra, Australia

Champions

Men's singles
- (Australia) James Duckworth

Women's singles
- (Japan) Risa Ozaki

Men's doubles
- (Australia) Luke Saville / (Australia) Jordan Thompson

Women's doubles
- (Australia) Jessica Moore / (Australia) Storm Sanders
- Canberra Tennis International

The 2016 Canberra Tennis International is a professional tennis tournament played on outdoor hard courts. It is the second edition of the tournament which was part of the 2016 ATP Challenger Tour and the 2016 ITF Women's Circuit. It took place in Canberra, Australia between 31 October and 6 November 2016.

This is not to be confused with 2016 Canberra Challenger.

== Men's singles main draw entrants ==
=== Seeds ===
Country	Player	Rank^{1}	Seed
AUS	Jordan Thompson	95	1
JPN	Yoshihito Nishioka	99	2
~~KOR~~	~~Chung Hyeon~~	~~135~~	~~3~~
ARG	Marco Trungelliti	139	4
AUS	James Duckworth	164	5
SLO	Grega Žemlja	169	6
AUS	Matthew Barton	189	7
AUS	John-Patrick Smith	255	8
AUS	Marc Polmans	262	9

- ^{1}Rankings are as of 24 October 2015.

=== Other entrants ===
The following players received wildcards into the singles main draw:

- (Australia) Harry Bourchier
- (Australia) Thomas Fancutt
- (Australia) Daniel Nolan
- (Australia) Gavin van Peperzeel

The following player received entry into the singles main draw with protected ranking:

- (United States) Jarmere Jenkins

The following players received entry from the qualifying draw:

- (Australia) Steven de Waard
- (Australia) Greg Jones
- (Germany) Daniel Masur

The following players entered as lucky losers:

- (United States) Nathan Pasha
- (Australia) Darren K. Polkinghorne

== Women's singles main draw entrants ==
=== Seeds ===
Country	Player	Rank^{1}	Seed
JPN	Risa Ozaki	117	1
JPN	Hiroko Kuwata	158	2
USA	Asia Muhammad	161	3
ISR	Julia Glushko	167	4
AUS	Arina Rodionova	186	5
JPN	Eri Hozumi	195	6
CRO	Jana Fett	198	7
JPN	Shuko Aoyama	215	8

- ^{1}Rankings are as of 24 October 2016.

=== Other entrants ===
The following players received wildcards into the singles main draw:

- (Australia) Seone Mendez
- (Australia) Sally Peers
- (Papua New Guinea) Abigail Tere-Apisah
- (Australia) Sara Tomic

The following players received entry from the qualifying draw:

- (Italy) Georgia Brescia
- (Brazil) Gabriela Cé
- (Australia) Abbie Myers
- (Australia) Viktorija Rajicic

== Champions ==
=== Men's singles ===
- (Australia) James Duckworth def. (Australia) Marc Polmans, 7–5, 6–3

=== Women's singles ===
- (Japan) Risa Ozaki def. (Italy) Georgia Brescia, 6–4, 6–4

=== Men's doubles ===
- (Australia) Luke Saville / (Australia) Jordan Thompson def. (Australia) Matt Reid / (Australia) John-Patrick Smith, 6–2, 6–3

=== Women's doubles ===
- (Australia) Jessica Moore / (Australia) Storm Sanders def. (Australia) Alison Bai / (Australia) Lizette Cabrera, 6–3, 6–4
