= 2023 Canberra Tennis International – Women's doubles =

Women's doubles
- 2023 Canberra Tennis International

Final
- Champions: Irina Khromacheva; Anastasia Tikhonova
- Runners-up: (United States) Robin Anderson (United States) Hailey Baptiste
- Score: 6–4, 7–5

Events
| Singles | men | women |
| Doubles | men | women |
| ← 2020 · | Canberra Tennis International | · 2024 → |

Alison Bai and Jaimee Fourlis were the defending champions, but both players chose not to participate.

Irina Khromacheva and Anastasia Tikhonova won the title, defeating Robin Anderson and Hailey Baptiste 6–4, 7–5 in the final.

== Seeds ==
1. (South Korea) Han Na-lae / (South Korea) Jang Su-jeong (quarterfinals)
2. Irina Khromacheva / Anastasia Tikhonova (champions)
3. (Netherlands) Suzan Lamens / (Netherlands) Eva Vedder (first round)
4. (Uzbekistan) Nigina Abduraimova / Darya Astakhova (first round, withdrew)

== Draw ==
=== Key ===
- Q = Qualifier
- WC = Wild card
- LL = Lucky loser
- Alt = Alternate
- SE = Special exempt
- PR = Protected ranking
- ITF = ITF entry
- JE = Junior exempt
- w/o = Walkover
- r = Retired
- d = Defaulted
- SR = Special ranking

First round
1 | (South Korea) N-l Han (South Korea) S-j Jang | 6 | 6
(Serbia) O Danilović (Switzerland) S Waltert | 3 | 4
(Hong Kong) E Chong (Serbia) N Stevanović | 3 | 5
(United States) R Anderson (United States) H Baptiste | 6 | 7
4 | (Uzbekistan) N Abduraimova; D Astakhova
E Avanesyan; O Selekhmeteva | w/o
(Australia) S McDonald (Australia) S Rokusek | 2 | 0
A Gasanova; A Zakharova | 6 | 6
(Czech Republic) M Bayerlová (Australia) A Parnaby | 2 | 6 | [10]
(United Kingdom) J Burrage (United Kingdom) H Watson | 6 | 2 | [6]
(United States) A Krueger (United States) R Montgomery | 6 | 5 | [10]
3 | (Netherlands) S Lamens (Netherlands) E Vedder | 1 | 7 | [5]
(Czech Republic) S Bejlek (Czech Republic) B Palicová | 4 | 2
(Australia) T Gibson (Australia) P Hule | 6 | 6
(Sweden) M Björklund (Australia) A Sharma
2 | I Khromacheva; A Tikhonova | w/o

Quarterfinals
1 | (South Korea) N-l Han (South Korea) S-j Jang | 3 | 4
(United States) R Anderson (United States) H Baptiste | 6 | 6
E Avanesyan; O Selekhmeteva | 6 | 6
A Gasanova; A Zakharova | 2 | 3
(Czech Republic) M Bayerlová (Australia) A Parnaby | 2 | 3
(United States) A Krueger (United States) R Montgomery | 6 | 6
(Australia) T Gibson (Australia) P Hule | 2 | 2
2 | I Khromacheva; A Tikhonova | 6 | 6

Semifinals
(United States) R Anderson (United States) H Baptiste | 6 | 6
E Avanesyan; O Selekhmeteva | 3 | 2
(United States) A Krueger (United States) R Montgomery | 2 | 6 | [9]
2 | I Khromacheva; A Tikhonova | 6 | 0 | [11]

Final
(United States) R Anderson (United States) H Baptiste | 4 | 5
2 | I Khromacheva; A Tikhonova | 6 | 7
