= 2023 Canberra Tennis International – Men's singles =

Men's singles
- 2023 Canberra Tennis International

Final
- Champion: (Hungary) Márton Fucsovics
- Runner-up: (Switzerland) Leandro Riedi
- Score: 7–5, 6–4

Events
Singles	men	women
Doubles	men	women
- Canberra Tennis International

Jordan Thompson was the defending champion but chose not to defend his title.

Márton Fucsovics won the title after defeating Leandro Riedi 7–5, 6–4 in the final.

== Seeds ==
1. (Hungary) Márton Fucsovics (champion)
2. (Ecuador) Emilio Gómez (first round)
3. (France) Hugo Gaston (second round)
4. (Slovakia) Norbert Gombos (quarterfinals)
5. Pavel Kotov (first round)
6. (Italy) Francesco Passaro (first round)
7. (Austria) Jurij Rodionov (second round)
8. (Argentina) Federico Delbonis (first round)

== Draw ==
Key

- Q = Qualifier
- WC = Wild card
- LL = Lucky loser
- Alt = Alternate
- ITF = ITF entry
- PR = Protected ranking
- SR = Special ranking
- SE = Special exempt
- JE = Junior exempt
- JR = Junior Accelerator Programme entrant
- CO = College Accelerator Programme entrant
- NG = Next Gen Accelerator Program entrant
- w/o = Walkover
- r = Retired
- d = Defaulted

=== Finals ===
Semifinals
1	(Hungary) Márton Fucsovics	6	7
(Japan) Yosuke Watanuki	2	5
(Switzerland) Leandro Riedi	7^{8}	5	6
(Germany) Jan-Lennard Struff	6^{6}	7	2

Final
1	(Hungary) Márton Fucsovics	7	6
(Switzerland) Leandro Riedi	5	4

=== Top half ===
First round
1	(Hungary) M Fucsovics	6	6
Q	(Italy) F Maestrelli	2	3
(Italy) M Arnaldi	6	6
A Shevchenko	4	1
Q	(United States) M Krueger	3	4
WC	(Australia) M Polmans	6	6
WC	(Australia) D Sweeny	6	6
5	P Kotov	4	1
4	(Slovakia) N Gombos	7^{8}	6
(Austria) F Misolic	6^{6}	4
(Slovakia) J Kovalík	6	3	7^{7}
PR	(United States) B Klahn	4	6	6^{1}
(Japan) Yo Watanuki	4	6	6
(France) L Van Assche	6	4	3
(Netherlands) G Brouwer	6	6^{7}	6^{7}
7	(Austria) J Rodionov	2	7^{9}	7^{9}

Second round
1	(Hungary) M Fucsovics	6	3	6
(Italy) M Arnaldi	2	6	1
WC	(Australia) M Polmans	7	7^{7}
WC	(Australia) D Sweeny	5	6^{2}
4	(Slovakia) N Gombos	6	7^{7}
(Slovakia) J Kovalík	3	6^{4}
(Japan) Yo Watanuki	6	5	7^{8}
7	(Austria) J Rodionov	4	7	6^{6}

Quarterfinals
1	(Hungary) M Fucsovics	3	6	7
WC	(Australia) M Polmans	6	4	5
4	(Slovakia) N Gombos	5	4
(Japan) Yo Watanuki	7	6

Semifinals
1	(Hungary) M Fucsovics	6	7
(Japan) Yo Watanuki	2	5

=== Bottom half ===
First round
6	(Italy) F Passaro	3	6^{2}
Q	(United Kingdom) L Broady	6	7^{7}
(Slovakia) L Klein	5	2
(Italy) L Nardi	7	6
(Switzerland) L Riedi	7^{7}	7^{7}
(Chile) N Jarry	6^{4}	6^{5}
(Australia) A Vukic	3	6^{5}
3	(France) H Gaston	6	7^{7}
8	(Argentina) F Delbonis	3	6	0
(Germany) J-L Struff	6	4	6
Q	(United States) Em Nava	0	4
Q	(France) A Müller	6	6
WC	(Australia) J McCabe	6	6
(Italy) F Agamenone	3	1
Q	(France) E Couacaud	7	7
2	(Ecuador) E Gómez	5	5

Second round
Q	(United Kingdom) L Broady	6^{5}	6	6
(Italy) L Nardi	7^{7}	4	1
(Switzerland) L Riedi	6	6
3	(France) H Gaston	4	2
(Germany) J-L Struff	6	6^{3}	6
Q	(France) A Müller	3	7^{7}	4
WC	(Australia) J McCabe	1	1
Q	(France) E Couacaud	6	6

Quarterfinals
Q	(United Kingdom) L Broady	7	4	4
(Switzerland) L Riedi	5	6	6
(Germany) J-L Struff	6	6
Q	(France) E Couacaud	4	2

Semifinals
(Switzerland) L Riedi	7^{8}	5	6
(Germany) J-L Struff	6^{6}	7	2
