= 2016 Canberra Tennis International – Men's doubles =

Men's doubles
- 2016 Canberra Tennis International

Final
- Champions: (Australia) Luke Saville (Australia) Jordan Thompson
- Runners-up: (Australia) Matt Reid (Australia) John-Patrick Smith
- Score: 6–2, 6–3

Events
Singles	men	women
Doubles	men	women
- Canberra Tennis International

The men's doubles event was held at the 2016 Canberra Tennis International in Canberra, Australia.

Alex Bolt and Andrew Whittington were the defending champions but chose not to defend their title.

Luke Saville and Jordan Thompson won the title after defeating Matt Reid and John-Patrick Smith 6–2, 6–3 in the final.

== Seeds ==
1. (Australia) Matt Reid / (Australia) John-Patrick Smith (final)
2. (Australia) Luke Saville / (Australia) Jordan Thompson (champions)
3. (Australia) Steven de Waard / (Australia) Marc Polmans (semifinals)
4. (India) Sriram Balaji / (India) Vijay Sundar Prashanth (semifinals)

== Draw ==
Key

- Q = Qualifier
- WC = Wild card
- LL = Lucky loser
- Alt = Alternate
- ITF = ITF entry
- PR = Protected ranking
- SR = Special ranking
- SE = Special exempt
- JE = Junior exempt
- JR = Junior Accelerator Programme entrant
- CO = College Accelerator Programme entrant
- NG = Next Gen Accelerator Program entrant
- w/o = Walkover
- r = Retired
- d = Defaulted

First round
1	(Australia) M Reid (Australia) J-P Smith	6	6
(Australia) O Jasika (India) S Nagal	2	1
(Australia) M Banes (Australia) Gavin van Peperzeel	6^{5}	6	[11]
(Australia) T Fancutt (Australia) S Puodziunas	7^{7}	3	[9]
3	(Australia) S de Waard (Australia) M Polmans	6	6
(United States) N Pasha (Australia) Darren K. Polkinghorne	3	3
WC	(Australia) A Addison (Australia) Nathan Eshmade	6^{10}	6	[7]
WC	(Australia) H Bourchier (Australia) J Frawley	7^{12}	1	[10]
' (Australia) D Kelly (Australia) M Purcell	6	6
(Australia) Daniel Nolan (Australia) C O'Connell	1	3
(United States) J Jenkins (United States) A Reed	5	6	[7]
4	(India) S Balaji (India) VS Prashanth	7	4	[10]
WC	(Australia) A Taylor (Australia) J Taylor	1	4
(Australia) M Barton (Australia) M Ebden	6	6
(Germany) D Masur (New Zealand) F Tearney	3	6	[6]
2	(Australia) L Saville (Australia) J Thompson	6	3	[10]

Quarterfinals
1	(Australia) M Reid (Australia) J-P Smith	7	6
(Australia) M Banes (Australia) G van Peperzeel	5	1
3	(Australia) S de Waard (Australia) M Polmans	6	6
WC	(Australia) H Bourchier (Australia) J Frawley	4	3
(Australia) D Kelly (Australia) M Purcell	1	6	[7]
4	(India) S Balaji (India) VS Prashanth	6	3	[10]
(Australia) M Barton (Australia) M Ebden	4	1
2	(Australia) L Saville (Australia) J Thompson	6	6

Semifinals
1	(Australia) M Reid (Australia) J-P Smith	6	6
3	(Australia) S de Waard (Australia) M Polmans	3	3
4	(India) S Balaji (India) VS Prashanth	6^{4}	5
2	(Australia) L Saville (Australia) J Thompson	7^{7}	7

Final
1	(Australia) M Reid (Australia) J-P Smith	2	3
2	(Australia) L Saville (Australia) J Thompson	6	6
