= 2016 Canberra Tennis International – Men's singles =

Men's singles
- 2016 Canberra Tennis International

Final
- Champion: (Australia) James Duckworth
- Runner-up: (Australia) Marc Polmans
- Score: 7–5, 6–3

Events
Singles	men	women
Doubles	men	women
- Canberra Tennis International

Benjamin Mitchell was the defending champion but chose not to defend his title.

James Duckworth won the title after defeating Marc Polmans 7–5, 6–3 in the final.

== Seeds ==
1. (Australia) Jordan Thompson (semifinals)
2. (Japan) Yoshihito Nishioka (withdrew)
3. (South Korea) Chung Hyeon (withdrew)
4. (Argentina) Marco Trungelliti (first round)
5. (Australia) James Duckworth (champion)
6. (Slovenia) Grega Žemlja (second round)
7. (Australia) Matthew Barton (first round)
8. (Australia) John-Patrick Smith (quarterfinals)
9. (Australia) Marc Polmans (final)

== Draw ==
Key

- Q = Qualifier
- WC = Wild card
- LL = Lucky loser
- Alt = Alternate
- ITF = ITF entry
- PR = Protected ranking
- SR = Special ranking
- SE = Special exempt
- JE = Junior exempt
- JR = Junior Accelerator Programme entrant
- CO = College Accelerator Programme entrant
- NG = Next Gen Accelerator Program entrant
- w/o = Walkover
- r = Retired
- d = Defaulted

=== Finals ===
Semifinals
1	(Australia) Jordan Thompson	3	4
5	(Australia) James Duckworth	6	6
9	(Australia) Marc Polmans	5	6	7^{7}
(Australia) Omar Jasika	7	3	6^{4}

Final
5	(Australia) James Duckworth	7	6
9	(Australia) Marc Polmans	5	3

=== Top half ===
First round
1	(Australia) J Thompson	6	7
(Australia) M Reid	1	5
LL	(United States) N Pasha	3	6	2
(Australia) M Ebden	6	1	6
(Australia) L Saville	4	2
(India) VS Prashanth	6	6
(Australia) B Mott	4	7^{7}	2
8	(Australia) J-P Smith	6	6^{5}	6
4	(Argentina) M Trungelliti	3	6	4
Q	(Germany) D Masur	6	3	6
(India) P Gunneswaran	3	5
(Australia) M Banes	6	7
(India) S Nagal	6	1	6
(Australia) D Kelly	4	6	2
WC	(Australia) Gavin van Peperzeel	7^{7}	3	4
5	(Australia) J Duckworth	6^{5}	6	6

Second round
1	(Australia) J Thompson	6	6
(Australia) M Ebden	0	2
(India) VS Prashanth	1	2
8	(Australia) JP Smith	6	6
Q	(Germany) D Masur	7^{7}	6
(Australia) M Banes	6^{2}	3
(India) S Nagal	3	3
5	(Australia) J Duckworth	6	6

Quarterfinals
1	(Australia) J Thompson	6	7^{7}
8	(Australia) JP Smith	1	6^{5}
Q	(Germany) D Masur	1	4
5	(Australia) J Duckworth	6	6

Semifinals
1	(Australia) J Thompson	3	4
5	(Australia) J Duckworth	6	6

=== Bottom half ===
First round
7	(Australia) M Barton	3	4
WC	(Australia) Daniel Nolan	6	6
Q	(Australia) S de Waard	6	6
WC	(Australia) T Fancutt	4	1
PR	(United States) J Jenkins	6	3	0
(Japan) Shuichi Sekiguchi	2	6	6
(India) S Balaji	2	4
9	(Australia) M Polmans	6	6
6	(Slovenia) G Žemlja	6	6
(New Zealand) F Tearney	3	4
(Australia) C O'Connell	4	4
(Australia) O Jasika	6	6
(Australia) M Purcell	6	7^{7}
WC	(Australia) H Bourchier	4	6^{1}
Q	(Australia) G Jones	6	7^{7}
LL	(Australia) Darren K. Polkinghorne	1	6^{5}

Second round
WC	(Australia) D Nolan	6	6
Q	(Australia) S de Waard	2	2
(Japan) S Sekiguchi	1	2
9	(Australia) M Polmans	6	6
6	(Slovenia) G Žemlja	1	4
(Australia) O Jasika	6	6
(Australia) M Purcell	3	6^{3}
Q	(Australia) G Jones	6	7^{7}

Quarterfinals
WC	(Australia) D Nolan	2	5
9	(Australia) M Polmans	6	7
(Australia) O Jasika	6	6
Q	(Australia) G Jones	3	1

Semifinals
9	(Australia) M Polmans	5	6	7^{7}
(Australia) O Jasika	7	3	6^{4}
