= 2026 Canberra Tennis International – Men's doubles =

Men's doubles
- 2026 Canberra Tennis International

Final
- Champions: (United States) Mac Kiger (United States) Reese Stalder
- Runners-up: (Australia) Blake Bayldon (Australia) Patrick Harper
- Score: 7–6^{(7–3)}, 6–3

Events
Singles	men	women
Doubles	men	women
- Canberra Tennis International

Ryan Seggerman and Eliot Spizzirri were the defending champions but only Seggerman chose to defend his title, partnering Matthew Romios. They lost in the semifinals to Mac Kiger and Reese Stalder.

Kiger and Stalder won the title after defeating Blake Bayldon and Patrick Harper 7–6^{(7–3)}, 6–3 in the final.

== Seeds ==
1. (Australia) Matthew Romios / (United States) Ryan Seggerman (semifinals)
2. (United Kingdom) Joshua Paris / (United Kingdom) Marcus Willis (semifinals)
3. (United States) Mac Kiger / (United States) Reese Stalder (champions)
4. (Australia) Blake Bayldon / (Australia) Patrick Harper (final)

== Draw ==
Key

- Q = Qualifier
- WC = Wild card
- LL = Lucky loser
- Alt = Alternate
- ITF = ITF entry
- PR = Protected ranking
- SR = Special ranking
- SE = Special exempt
- JE = Junior exempt
- JR = Junior Accelerator Programme entrant
- CO = College Accelerator Programme entrant
- NG = Next Gen Accelerator Program entrant
- w/o = Walkover
- r = Retired
- d = Defaulted

First round
1	(Australia) M Romios (United States) R Seggerman	7^{7}	6
(Australia) E Winter (Australia) Hugh Winter	6^{4}	4
(Croatia) L Mikrut (France) L Pavlovic	7	6
(Japan) Yuichiro Inui (Japan) Tomohiro Masabayashi	5	2
3	(United States) M Kiger (United States) R Stalder	w/o
(Spain) R Carballés Baena (Spain) P Llamas Ruiz
(Australia) Tomislav Edward Papac (Australia) Christopher Sousou	4	3
(France) U Blanchet (France) H Grenier	6	6
(United States) M Damm (Colombia) DE Galán	6	6
WC	(Australia) Ethan Domingo (Australia) Ymerali Ibraimi	1	4
(Belgium) GA Bailly (Belgium) A Blockx	6^{2}	4
4	(Australia) B Bayldon (Australia) P Harper	7^{7}	6
(Australia) A Bolt (Australia) M Polmans	6	6
WC	(Australia) Daniel Jovanovski (Australia) Pavle Marinkov	4	4
(Chile) T Barrios Vera (Colombia) N Mejía
2	(United Kingdom) J Paris (United Kingdom) M Willis	w/o

Quarterfinals
1	(Australia) M Romios (United States) R Seggerman	6	6
(Croatia) L Mikrut (France) L Pavlovic	1	4
3	(United States) M Kiger (United States) R Stalder	w/o
(France) U Blanchet (France) H Grenier
(United States) M Damm (Colombia) DE Galán
4	(Australia) B Bayldon (Australia) P Harper	w/o
(Australia) A Bolt (Australia) M Polmans	6	3	[8]
2	(United Kingdom) J Paris (United Kingdom) M Willis	3	6	[10]

Semifinals
1	(Australia) M Romios (United States) R Seggerman	3	4
3	(United States) M Kiger (United States) R Stalder	6	6
4	(Australia) B Bayldon (Australia) P Harper	4	7^{7}	[10]
2	(United Kingdom) J Paris (United Kingdom) M Willis	6	6^{5}	[6]

Final
3	(United States) M Kiger (United States) R Stalder	7^{7}	6
4	(Australia) B Bayldon (Australia) P Harper	6^{3}	3
