= 2018 Canberra Tennis International =

- Date: 29 October–4 November
- Edition: 4th
- Category: ATP Challenger Tour; ITF Women's Circuit
- Prize money: $75,000 (men) $60,000 (women)
- Surface: Hard
- Location: Canberra, Australia

Champions

Men's singles
- (Australia) Jordan Thompson

Women's singles
- (Australia) Zoe Hives

Men's doubles
- (United Kingdom) Evan Hoyt / (Chinese Taipei) Wu Tung-lin

Women's doubles
- (Australia) Ellen Perez / (Australia) Arina Rodionova
- Canberra Tennis International

The 2018 Apis Canberra International was a professional tennis tournament played on outdoor hardcourts. It was the fourth edition of the tournament and was part of the 2018 ATP Challenger Tour and the 2018 ITF Women's Circuit. It took place in Canberra, Australia, on 29 October–4 November 2018.

== Men's singles main draw entrants ==
=== Seeds ===
Country	Player	Rank^{1}	Seed
~~AUS~~	~~Jason Kubler~~	~~97~~	~~1~~
JPN	Yoshihito Nishioka	98	2
AUS	Jordan Thompson	101	3
AUS	Alex Bolt	140	4
AUS	Marc Polmans	145	5
JPN	Hiroki Moriya	191	6
JPN	Yosuke Watanuki	231	7
JPN	Yasutaka Uchiyama	232	8

- ^{1} Rankings as of 22 October 2018.

=== Other entrants ===
The following players received a wildcard into the singles main draw:

- (Australia) Jeremy Beale
- (Australia) Jacob Grills
- (Australia) Luke Saville
- (Australia) Aleksandar Vukic

The following players received entry from the qualifying draw:

- (Australia) Thomas Fancutt
- (United Kingdom) Brydan Klein
- (New Zealand) Rubin Statham
- (Italy) Francesco Vilardo

The following player received entry as a lucky loser:

- (Chinese Taipei) Wu Tung-lin

== Women's singles main draw entrants ==
=== Seeds ===
Country	Player	Rank^{1}	Seed
AUS	Arina Rodionova	161	1
GBR	Gabriella Taylor	172	2
AUS	Priscilla Hon	185	3
AUS	Olivia Rogowska	192	4
AUS	Jaimee Fourlis	199	5
AUS	Ellen Perez	214	6
AUS	Destanee Aiava	219	7
GBR	Katy Dunne	228	8

- ^{1} Rankings as of 22 October 2018.

=== Other entrants ===
The following players received a wildcard into the singles main draw:

- (Australia) Alexandra Bozovic
- (Australia) Seone Mendez
- (Australia) Alana Parnaby
- (Australia) Olivia Tjandramulia

The following players received entry from the qualifying draw:

- (United Kingdom) Jodie Anna Burrage
- (Australia) Maddison Inglis
- (France) Irina Ramialison
- (Slovakia) Zuzana Zlochová

== Champions ==
=== Men's singles ===
- (Australia) Jordan Thompson def. (Spain) Nicola Kuhn 6–1, 5–7, 6–4.

=== Women's singles ===
- (Australia) Zoe Hives def. (Australia) Olivia Rogowska, 6–4, 6–2

=== Men's doubles ===
- (United Kingdom) Evan Hoyt / (Chinese Taipei) Wu Tung-lin def. (Australia) Jeremy Beale / (Australia) Thomas Fancutt 7–6^{(7–5)}, 5–7, [10–8].

=== Women's doubles ===
- (Australia) Ellen Perez / (Australia) Arina Rodionova def. (Australia) Destanee Aiava / (Australia) Naiktha Bains, 6–7^{(5–7)}, 6–3, [10–7]
