= 2026 Canberra Tennis International – Women's doubles =

Women's doubles
- 2026 Canberra Tennis International

Final
- Champions: Maria Kozyreva; Iryna Shymanovich
- Runners-up: (Japan) Ena Shibahara; Vera Zvonareva
- Score: 6–7^{(9–11)}, 7–5, [10–8]

Events
| Singles | men | women |
| Doubles | men | women |
- Canberra Tennis International

Maria Kozyreva and Iryna Shymanovich won the title, defeating Ena Shibahara and Vera Zvonareva in the final, 6–7^{(9–11)}, 7–5, [10–8].

Jaimee Fourlis and Petra Hule were the reigning champions, but Fourlis did not participate this year. Hule partnered Elena Micic, but they lost in the first round to Hiroko Kuwata and Alexandra Osborne.

== Seeds ==
1. (United States) Quinn Gleason / Elena Pridankina (semifinals)
2. Maria Kozyreva / Iryna Shymanovich (champions)
3. (Hong Kong) Eudice Chong / (Chinese Taipei) Liang En-shuo (quarterfinals)
4. (Japan) Momoko Kobori / (Japan) Ayano Shimizu (quarterfinals)

== Draw ==
Key

- Q = Qualifier
- WC = Wild card
- LL = Lucky loser
- Alt = Alternate
- ITF = ITF entry
- PR = Protected ranking
- SR = Special ranking
- SE = Special exempt
- JE = Junior exempt
- JR = Junior Accelerator Programme entrant
- CO = College Accelerator Programme entrant
- NG = Next Gen Accelerator Program entrant
- w/o = Walkover
- r = Retired
- d = Defaulted

First round
1 | (United States) Q Gleason; E Pridankina | 6 | 6
WC | (Australia) R Gilheany (Australia) C Kempenaers-Pocz | 3 | 3
(Japan) H Kuwata (Australia) A Osborne | 7 | 6
(Australia) P Hule (Australia) E Micic | 5 | 2
3 | (Hong Kong) E Chong (Chinese Taipei) E-s Liang | 6 | 6
Alt | (Australia) D Aiava (Australia) G Da Silva-Fick | 4 | 2
PR | (Japan) E Shibahara; V Zvonareva | 6 | 6
(United States) M Stoiana (Czech Republic) D Vidmanova | 3 | 2
(Georgia (country)) E Gorgodze (Italy) C Rosatello | 6 | 6
(United States) E Kalieva (United States) CYS Lee | 4 | 2
(Spain) G Maristany (Slovenia) T Zidanšek | 1 | 6 | [5]
4 | (Japan) M Kobori (Japan) A Shimizu | 6 | 4 | [10]
A Gasanova; P Iatcenko | 6^{3} | 2
A Korneeva (Czech Republic) D Šalková | 7^{7} | 6
(Italy) L Bronzetti (Uzbekistan) P Kudermetova | 2 | 4
2 | M Kozyreva; I Shymanovich | 6 | 6

Quarterfinals
1 | (United States) Q Gleason; E Pridankina | 6 | 6
(Japan) H Kuwata (Australia) A Osborne | 1 | 4
3 | (Hong Kong) E Chong (Chinese Taipei) E-s Liang | 6 | 3 | [8]
PR | (Japan) E Shibahara; V Zvonareva | 4 | 6 | [10]
(Georgia (country)) E Gorgodze (Italy) C Rosatello | 7^{7} | 6
4 | (Japan) M Kobori (Japan) A Shimizu | 6^{5} | 4
A Korneeva (Czech Republic) D Šalková | 5 | 7^{9} | [3]
2 | M Kozyreva; I Shymanovich | 7 | 6^{7} | [10]

Semifinals
1 | (United States) Q Gleason; E Pridankina | 5 | 7^{7} | [7]
PR | (Japan) E Shibahara; V Zvonareva | 7 | 6^{2} | [10]
(Georgia (country)) E Gorgodze (Italy) C Rosatello | 3 | 1
2 | M Kozyreva; I Shymanovich | 6 | 6

Final
PR | (Japan) E Shibahara; V Zvonareva | 7^{11} | 5 | [8]
2 | M Kozyreva; I Shymanovich | 6^{9} | 7 | [10]
