= 2018 Canberra Tennis International – Women's doubles =

Women's doubles
- 2018 Canberra Tennis International

Final
- Champions: (Australia) Ellen Perez (Australia) Arina Rodionova
- Runners-up: (Australia) Destanee Aiava (Australia) Naiktha Bains
- Score: 6–7^{(5–7)}, 6–3, [10–7]

Events
Singles	men	women
Doubles	men	women
← 2017 ·	Canberra Tennis International	· 2019 →

Asia Muhammad and Arina Rodionova were the defending champions, but Muhammad chose not to participate.

Rodionova played alongside Ellen Perez and successfully defended her title, defeating Destanee Aiava and Naiktha Bains in the final, 6–7^{(5–7)}, 6–3, [10–7].

== Seeds ==
1. (Australia) Ellen Perez / (Australia) Arina Rodionova (champions)
2. (Australia) Alison Bai / (Australia) Zoe Hives (first round)
3. (Australia) Destanee Aiava / (Australia) Naiktha Bains (final)
4. (Australia) Alexandra Bozovic / (Australia) Olivia Tjandramulia (quarterfinals)

== Draw ==
=== Key ===
- Q = Qualifier
- WC = Wild card
- LL = Lucky loser
- Alt = Alternate
- ITF = ITF entry
- PR = Protected ranking
- SR = Special ranking
- SE = Special exempt
- JE = Junior exempt
- JR = Junior Accelerator Programme entrant
- CO = College Accelerator Programme entrant
- NG = Next Gen Accelerator Program entrant
- w/o = Walkover
- r = Retired
- d = Defaulted

=== Draw ===
First round
1	(Australia) E Perez (Australia) Ar Rodionova	3	6	[10]
(Australia) A Parnaby (Australia) A Smith	6	3	[8]
WC	(Australia) L Ashley (Australia) I Bozicevic	1	2
LL	(United States) YK Chiang (France) M Partaud	6	6
4	(Australia) A Bozovic (Australia) O Tjandramulia	6	6
WC	(Australia) N Barbir (Australia) G Jones	1	3
WC	(Australia) S Mendez (Australia) A Osborne	2	3
(Australia) L Cabrera (Australia) J Fourlis	6	6
(Japan) M Imanishi (Papua New Guinea) A Tere-Apisah	w/o
(United Kingdom) JA Burrage (Uzbekistan) A Khabibulina
(Australia) M Inglis (Australia) K McPhee	6	3	[5]
3	(Australia) D Aiava (Australia) N Bains	2	6	[10]
(Australia) P Hon (Australia) O Rogowska	7^{7}	6
Q	(New Zealand) E Routliffe (Ukraine) M Zakarlyuk	6^{3}	2
(Australia) A Sharma (Australia) I Wallace	6	4	[10]
2	(Australia) A Bai (Australia) Z Hives	3	6	[6]

Quarterfinals
1	(Australia) E Perez (Australia) Ar Rodionova	7	6
LL	(United States) YK Chiang (France) M Partaud	5	3
4	(Australia) A Bozovic (Australia) O Tjandramulia	5	6	[10]
(Australia) L Cabrera (Australia) J Fourlis	7	3	[12]
(Japan) M Imanishi (Papua New Guinea) A Tere-Apisah	6	1	[6]
3	(Australia) D Aiava (Australia) N Bains	3	6	[10]
(Australia) P Hon (Australia) O Rogowska	4	6	[10]
(Australia) A Sharma (Australia) I Wallace	6	3	[5]

Semifinals
1	(Australia) E Perez (Australia) Ar Rodionova	6	6
(Australia) L Cabrera (Australia) J Fourlis	2	4
3	(Australia) D Aiava (Australia) N Bains	6	6
(Australia) P Hon (Australia) O Rogowska	1	4

Final
1	(Australia) E Perez (Australia) Ar Rodionova	6^{5}	6	[10]
3	(Australia) D Aiava (Australia) N Bains	7^{7}	3	[7]
