= 2026 Canberra Tennis International – Men's singles =

Men's singles
- 2026 Canberra Tennis International

Final
- Champion: (Belgium) Alexander Blockx
- Runner-up: (Spain) Rafael Jódar
- Score: 6–4, 6–4

Events
| Singles | men | women |
| Doubles | men | women |
- Canberra Tennis International

João Fonseca was the defending champion but chose not to defend his title.

Alexander Blockx won the title after defeating Rafael Jódar 6–4, 6–4 in the final.

== Seeds ==
1. (Czech Republic) Vít Kopřiva (quarterfinals)
2. (Italy) Luca Nardi (first round)
3. (Japan) Yoshihito Nishioka (first round)
4. (Chile) Tomás Barrios Vera (quarterfinals)
5. (United States) Brandon Holt (first round)
6. (Belgium) Alexander Blockx (champion)
7. (Denmark) Elmer Møller (first round)
8. (Serbia) Dušan Lajović (quarterfinals)

== Draw ==
Key

- Q = Qualifier
- WC = Wild card
- LL = Lucky loser
- Alt = Alternate
- ITF = ITF entry
- PR = Protected ranking
- SR = Special ranking
- SE = Special exempt
- JE = Junior exempt
- JR = Junior Accelerator Programme entrant
- CO = College Accelerator Programme entrant
- NG = Next Gen Accelerator Program entrant
- w/o = Walkover
- r = Retired
- d = Defaulted

=== Finals ===
Semifinals
6 | (Belgium) Alexander Blockx | 6 | 6^{3} | 6
WC | (Australia) James McCabe | 3 | 7^{7} | 3
(France) Kyrian Jacquet | 3 | 0^{r}
Q | (Spain) Rafael Jódar | 6 | 0

Final
6 | (Belgium) Alexander Blockx | 6 | 6
Q | (Spain) Rafael Jódar | 4 | 4

=== Top half ===
First round
1 | (Czech Republic) V Kopřiva | 6 | 2
(Japan) K Nishikori | 1 | 2^{r}
Q | (United States) M Cassone | 6 | 5 | 3
(Slovakia) L Klein | 4 | 7 | 6
(Spain) R Carballés Baena | 7^{7} | 6
(United States) C Smith | 6^{4} | 3
(Norway) N Budkov Kjær | 2 | 3
6 | (Belgium) A Blockx | 6 | 6
4 | (Chile) T Barrios Vera | 6 | 6
WC | (Australia) P Sekulic | 4 | 4
(France) U Blanchet | 6 | 6
(Portugal) H Rocha | 3 | 4
WC | (Australia) J McCabe | 7^{7} | 7^{10}
(Estonia) M Lajal | 6^{3} | 6^{8}
Q | (United Kingdom) J Pinnington Jones | 6 | 6
5 | (United States) B Holt | 4 | 2

Second round
1 | (Czech Republic) V Kopřiva | 7^{7} | 7^{7}
(Slovakia) L Klein | 6^{1} | 6^{1}
(Spain) R Carballés Baena | 6^{8} | 6 | 5
6 | (Belgium) A Blockx | 7^{10} | 3 | 7
4 | (Chile) T Barrios Vera | 6^{6} | 6 | 7^{7}
(France) U Blanchet | 7^{8} | 3 | 6^{4}
WC | (Australia) J McCabe | 6 | 7^{7}
Q | (United Kingdom) J Pinnington Jones | 4 | 6^{4}

Quarterfinals
1 | (Czech Republic) V Kopřiva | 5 | 7 | 4
6 | (Belgium) A Blockx | 7 | 5 | 6
4 | (Chile) T Barrios Vera | 1 | 6^{5}
WC | (Australia) J McCabe | 6 | 7^{7}

Semifinals
6 | (Belgium) A Blockx | 6 | 6^{3} | 6
WC | (Australia) J McCabe | 3 | 7^{7} | 3

=== Bottom half ===
First round
8 | (Serbia) D Lajović | 6 | 6
(Austria) S Ofner | 3 | 2
Q | (Colombia) N Mejía | 6^{6} | 6 | 6^{6}
NG | (Germany) J Engel | 7^{8} | 1 | 7^{8}
(Colombia) DE Galán | 7 | 7
Q | (Austria) L Neumayer | 5 | 5
(France) K Jacquet | 2 | 6 | 7
3 | (Japan) Y Nishioka | 6 | 1 | 5
7 | (Denmark) E Møller | 1 | 3
(Portugal) J Faria | 6 | 6
Q | (Spain) R Jódar | 6 | 6
(Chile) N Jarry | 3 | 4
(Japan) S Shimabukuro | 6 | 6
WC | (Australia) E Winter | 4 | 1
Q | (Luxembourg) C Rodesch | 7^{7} | 6
2 | (Italy) L Nardi | 6^{4} | 2

Second round
8 | (Serbia) D Lajović | 6 | 7^{7}
NG | (Germany) J Engel | 4 | 6^{4}
(Colombia) DE Galán | 2 | 4
(France) K Jacquet | 6 | 6
(Portugal) J Faria | 1 | 4
Q | (Spain) R Jódar | 6 | 6
(Japan) S Shimabukuro | 7^{7} | 7^{7}
Q | (Luxembourg) C Rodesch | 6^{5} | 6^{3}

Quarterfinals
8 | (Serbia) D Lajović | 6^{2} | 5
(France) K Jacquet | 7^{7} | 7
Q | (Spain) R Jódar | 6 | 6
(Japan) S Shimabukuro | 2 | 4

Semifinals
(France) K Jacquet | 3 | 0^{r}
Q | (Spain) R Jódar | 6 | 0
