= 2017 Canberra Tennis International – Men's singles =

Men's singles
- 2017 Canberra Tennis International

Final
- Champion: (Australia) Matthew Ebden
- Runner-up: (Japan) Taro Daniel
- Score: 7–6^{(7–4)}, 6–4

Events
Singles	men	women
Doubles	men	women
- Canberra Tennis International

James Duckworth was the defending champion but chose not to defend his title.

Matthew Ebden won the title after defeating Taro Daniel 7–6^{(7–4)}, 6–4 in the final.

== Seeds ==
1. (Australia) Jordan Thompson (withdrew)
2. (Japan) Taro Daniel (final)
3. (Australia) Matthew Ebden (champion)
4. (United States) Mitchell Krueger (first round)
5. (United States) Evan King (second round)
6. (United States) Noah Rubin (first round)
7. (Australia) John Millman (withdrew)
8. (Australia) Omar Jasika (quarterfinals)

== Draw ==
Key

- Q = Qualifier
- WC = Wild card
- LL = Lucky loser
- Alt = Alternate
- ITF = ITF entry
- PR = Protected ranking
- SR = Special ranking
- SE = Special exempt
- JE = Junior exempt
- JR = Junior Accelerator Programme entrant
- CO = College Accelerator Programme entrant
- NG = Next Gen Accelerator Program entrant
- w/o = Walkover
- r = Retired
- d = Defaulted

=== Finals ===
Semifinals
(Australia) Marc Polmans	7	1	4
3	(Australia) Matthew Ebden	5	6	6
(Australia) Alex Bolt	6^{2}	2
2	(Japan) Taro Daniel	7^{7}	6

Final
3	(Australia) Matthew Ebden	7^{7}	6
2	(Japan) Taro Daniel	6^{4}	4

=== Top half ===
First round
LL	(Australia) C O'Connell	3	6^{5}
PR	(Australia) A Harris	6	7^{7}
(United States) A Sarkissian	6	3
WC	(Australia) Benard Bruno Nkomba	0	0^{r}
(Australia) M Polmans	3	7^{7}	6
(Australia) D Kelly	6	6^{4}	3
(India) S Mukund	4	4
LL	(Australia) B Mitchell	6	6
3	(Australia) M Ebden	6	6
(United Kingdom) B Klein	3	4
Q	(Australia) M Barton	4	6^{4}
(New Zealand) R Statham	6	7^{7}
(Austria) L Miedler	5	2
WC	(Australia) B Ellis	7	6
(Australia) B Mousley	6^{6}	3
5	(United States) E King	7^{8}	6

Second round
PR	(Australia) A Harris	1	4
(United States) A Sarkissian	6	6
(Australia) M Polmans	6	2	7
LL	(Australia) B Mitchell	2	6	5
3	(Australia) M Ebden	6	6
(New Zealand) R Statham	2	1
WC	(Australia) B Ellis	4	6	6
5	(United States) E King	6	1	4

Quarterfinals
(United States) A Sarkissian	6^{3}	3
(Australia) M Polmans	7^{7}	6
3	(Australia) M Ebden	6	7^{7}
WC	(Australia) B Ellis	2	6^{3}

Semifinals
(Australia) M Polmans	7	1	4
3	(Australia) M Ebden	5	6	6

=== Bottom half ===
First round
6	(United States) N Rubin	3	2
(Germany) S Fanselow	6	6
WC	(Australia) Jacob Grills	4	4
(Australia) A Bolt	6	6
Q	(Australia) D Propoggia	3	4
Q	(Australia) Gavin van Peperzeel	6	6
(Australia) L Saville	6	7
4	(United States) M Krueger	2	5
8/Alt	(Australia) O Jasika	6	7^{7}
(Australia) H Bourchier	4	6^{5}
Q	(Australia) C Puttergill	6^{2}	1
SE	(Australia) J Kubler	7^{7}	6
(Australia) M Banes	6^{5}	6	6
(Australia) A Whittington	7^{7}	3	2
(Brazil) A Ghem	5	2
2	(Japan) T Daniel	7	6

Second round
(Germany) S Fanselow	1	6^{4}
(Australia) A Bolt	6	7^{7}
Q	(Australia) G van Peperzeel	6	7^{7}
(Australia) L Saville	3	6^{3}
8/Alt	(Australia) O Jasika	6	6
SE	(Australia) J Kubler	2	3
(Australia) M Banes	1	6^{4}
2	(Japan) T Daniel	6	7^{7}

Quarterfinals
(Australia) A Bolt	6	6
Q	(Australia) G van Peperzeel	4	4
8/Alt	(Australia) O Jasika	6^{0}	4
2	(Japan) T Daniel	7^{7}	6

Semifinals
(Australia) A Bolt	6^{2}	2
2	(Japan) T Daniel	7^{7}	6
