= 2016 Canberra Tennis International – Women's doubles =

Women's doubles
- 2016 Canberra Tennis International

Final
- Champions: (Australia) Jessica Moore (Australia) Storm Sanders
- Runners-up: (Australia) Alison Bai (Australia) Lizette Cabrera
- Score: 6–3, 6–4

Events
Singles	men	women
Doubles	men	women
← 2015 ·	Canberra Tennis International	· 2017 →

Misa Eguchi and Eri Hozumi were the defending champions, but chose not to participate.

Jessica Moore and Storm Sanders won the title, defeating Alison Bai and Lizette Cabrera in the final, 6–3, 6–4.

== Seeds ==
1. (United States) Asia Muhammad / (Australia) Arina Rodionova (semifinals)
2. (Australia) Jessica Moore / (Australia) Storm Sanders (champions)
3. (Brazil) Gabriela Cé / (Poland) Katarzyna Kawa (first round)
4. (Australia) Alison Bai / (Australia) Lizette Cabrera (final)

== Draw ==
=== Key ===
- Q = Qualifier
- WC = Wild card
- LL = Lucky loser
- Alt = Alternate
- SE = Special exempt
- PR = Protected ranking
- ITF = ITF entry
- JE = Junior exempt
- w/o = Walkover
- r = Retired
- d = Defaulted
- SR = Special ranking

First round
1	(United States) A Muhammad (Australia) Ar Rodionova	6	6
(United States) YK Chiang (United States) S Talcott	2	0
(Thailand) N Lertcheewakarn (Thailand) V Wongteanchai	2	6	[10]
Q	(Australia) G Da Silva-Fick (Australia) S Mendez	6	3	[0]
4	(Australia) A Bai (Australia) L Cabrera	6	6
(United Kingdom) K Dunne (United States) J Elie	3	2
(Australia) M Adamczak (Australia) O Rogowska	6	4	[5]
(Australia) T Patterson (Australia) S Peers	4	6	[10]
Q	(Australia) G Lorbergs (Australia) A Parnaby	7^{10}	6
(Australia) R McBryde (Australia) B Winley	6^{8}	0
(Germany) V Heisen (Australia) O Tjandramulia	6	6
3	(Brazil) G Cé (Poland) K Kawa	2	3
(Croatia) J Fett (Japan) A Okuno	6	2	[8]
(Australia) D Aiava (Australia) A Myers	4	6	[10]
(Australia) N Bains (Papua New Guinea) A Tere-Apisah	1	1
2	(Australia) J Moore (Australia) S Sanders	6	6

Quarterfinals
1	(United States) A Muhammad (Australia) Ar Rodionova	3	6	[11]
(Thailand) N Lertcheewakarn (Thailand) V Wongteanchai	6	1	[9]
4	(Australia) A Bai (Australia) L Cabrera	6	7
(Australia) T Patterson (Australia) S Peers	4	5
Q	(Australia) G Lorbergs (Australia) A Parnaby	5	1
(Germany) V Heisen (Australia) O Tjandramulia	7	6
(Australia) D Aiava (Australia) A Myers	4	4
2	(Australia) J Moore (Australia) S Sanders	6	6

Semifinals
1	(United States) A Muhammad (Australia) Ar Rodionova	3	6	[2]
4	(Australia) A Bai (Australia) L Cabrera	6	3	[10]
(Germany) V Heisen (Australia) O Tjandramulia	2	3
2	(Australia) J Moore (Australia) S Sanders	6	6

Final
4	(Australia) A Bai (Australia) L Cabrera	3	4
2	(Australia) J Moore (Australia) S Sanders	6	6
