= 2023 Canberra Tennis International – Women's singles =

Women's singles
- 2023 Canberra Tennis International

Final
- Champion: (United Kingdom) Katie Boulter
- Runner-up: (United Kingdom) Jodie Burrage
- Score: 3–6, 6–3, 6–2

Events
| Singles | men | women |
| Doubles | men | women |
| ← 2020 · | Canberra Tennis International | · 2024 → |

Magdalena Fręch was the defending champion but chose to play at the 2023 Adelaide International 1 instead.

Katie Boulter won the title, defeating Jodie Burrage 3–6, 6–3, 6–2 in the final.

== Seeds ==
1. (Ukraine) Kateryna Baindl (first round)
2. (Slovakia) Anna Karolína Schmiedlová (first round)
3. (France) Diane Parry (second round)
4. (Switzerland) Simona Waltert (first round)
5. (Germany) Eva Lys (quarterfinals)
6. (United Kingdom) Jodie Burrage (final)
7. Erika Andreeva (first round)
8. (United Kingdom) Katie Boulter (champion)

== Draw ==
=== Key ===
- Q = Qualifier
- WC = Wild card
- LL = Lucky loser
- Alt = Alternate
- SE = Special exempt
- PR = Protected ranking
- ITF = ITF entry
- JE = Junior exempt
- w/o = Walkover
- r = Retired
- d = Defaulted
- SR = Special ranking

=== Finals ===
Semifinals
8 | (United Kingdom) Katie Boulter | 6 | 6
(United States) Hailey Baptiste | 2 | 2
6 | (United Kingdom) Jodie Burrage | w/o
(Ukraine) Lesia Tsurenko

Final
8 | (United Kingdom) Katie Boulter | 3 | 6 | 6
6 | (United Kingdom) Jodie Burrage | 6 | 3 | 2

=== Top half ===
First round
1 | (Ukraine) K Baindl | 4 | 1
(United Kingdom) H Watson | 6 | 6
Q | A Gasanova | 3 | 4
Q | (United Kingdom) Y Miyazaki | 6 | 6
LL | (United States) R Anderson | 4 | 4
Q | O Selekhmeteva | 6 | 6
(South Korea) N-l Han | 0 | 1
8 | (United Kingdom) K Boulter | 6 | 6
4 | (Switzerland) S Waltert | 3 | 6 | 4
(Ukraine) D Snigur | 6 | 3 | 6
Q | (Netherlands) S Lamens | 4 | 4
WC | (Australia) A Sharma | 6 | 6
LL | (Netherlands) A Hartono | 3 | 1
(Sweden) M Björklund | 6 | 6
(United States) H Baptiste | 6 | 7
7 | E Andreeva | 3 | 5

Second round
(United Kingdom) H Watson | 6 | 6
Q | (United Kingdom) Y Miyazaki | 0 | 3
Q | O Selekhmeteva | 0 | 5
8 | (United Kingdom) K Boulter | 6 | 7
(Ukraine) D Snigur | 2 | 2
WC | (Australia) A Sharma | 6 | 6
(Sweden) M Björklund | 6 | 5 | 2
(United States) H Baptiste | 3 | 7 | 6

Quarterfinals
(United Kingdom) H Watson | 1 | 3
8 | (United Kingdom) K Boulter | 6 | 6
WC | (Australia) A Sharma | 1 | 3
(United States) H Baptiste | 6 | 6

Semifinals
8 | (United Kingdom) K Boulter | 6 | 6
(United States) H Baptiste | 2 | 2

=== Bottom half ===
First round
6 | (United Kingdom) J Burrage | 6 | 6^{7} | 6
(South Korea) S-j Jang | 4 | 7^{9} | 3
Q | D Astakhova | 6 | 6
WC | (Australia) T Gibson | 4 | 4
Q | (Japan) M Hontama | 6 | 6
(Spain) L Romero Gormaz | 4 | 3
Q | (United States) A Krueger | 6 | 3 | 6^{1}
3 | (France) D Parry | 2 | 6 | 7^{7}
5 | (Germany) E Lys | 6 | 4 | 6
SR | (Serbia) O Danilović | 3 | 6 | 4
WC | (Australia) P Hule | 6 | 4 | 2
E Avanesyan | 3 | 6 | 6
(Uzbekistan) N Abduraimova | 7 | 6
Q | A Zakharova | 5 | 3
(Ukraine) L Tsurenko | 7^{7} | 6
2 | (Slovakia) AK Schmiedlová | 6^{4} | 2

Second round
6 | (United Kingdom) J Burrage | 6 | 6
Q | D Astakhova | 3 | 4
Q | (Japan) M Hontama | 6 | 6
3 | (France) D Parry | 4 | 4
5 | (Germany) E Lys | 4 | 6 | 6
E Avanesyan | 6 | 3 | 0
(Uzbekistan) N Abduraimova | 7^{11} | 2 | 4
(Ukraine) L Tsurenko | 6^{9} | 6 | 6

Quarterfinals
6 | (United Kingdom) J Burrage | 6 | 6
Q | (Japan) M Hontama | 4 | 4
5 | (Germany) E Lys | 2 | 7 | 3
(Ukraine) L Tsurenko | 6 | 5 | 6

Semifinals
6 | (United Kingdom) J Burrage | w/o
(Ukraine) L Tsurenko
