= 2018 Canberra Tennis International – Women's singles =

Women's singles
- 2018 Canberra Tennis International

Final
- Champion: (Australia) Zoe Hives
- Runner-up: (Australia) Olivia Rogowska
- Score: 6–4, 6–2

Events
| Singles | men | women |
| Doubles | men | women |
| ← 2017 · | Canberra Tennis International | · 2020 → |

Olivia Rogowska was the defending champion, but lost in the final to Zoe Hives, 6–4, 6–2.

== Seeds ==
1. (Australia) Arina Rodionova (second round)
2. (United Kingdom) Gabriella Taylor (first round)
3. (Australia) Priscilla Hon (second round)
4. (Australia) Olivia Rogowska (final)
5. (Australia) Jaimee Fourlis (first round)
6. (Australia) Ellen Perez (second round)
7. (Australia) Destanee Aiava (first round)
8. (United Kingdom) Katy Dunne (first round)

== Draw ==
=== Key ===
- Q = Qualifier
- WC = Wild card
- LL = Lucky loser
- Alt = Alternate
- ITF = ITF entry
- PR = Protected ranking
- SR = Special ranking
- SE = Special exempt
- JE = Junior exempt
- JR = Junior Accelerator Programme entrant
- CO = College Accelerator Programme entrant
- NG = Next Gen Accelerator Program entrant
- w/o = Walkover
- r = Retired
- d = Defaulted

=== Finals ===
Semifinals
(Australia) Astra Sharma | 1 | 4
4 | (Australia) Olivia Rogowska | 6 | 6
(Australia) Zoe Hives | 4 | 6 | 6
(Australia) Isabelle Wallace | 6 | 3 | 4

Final
4 | (Australia) Olivia Rogowska | 4 | 2
(Australia) Zoe Hives | 6 | 6

=== Top half ===
First round
1 | (Australia) Ar Rodionova | 7^{7} | 6
Q | (Slovakia) Z Zlochová | 6^{3} | 0
(Japan) R Ozaki | 6 | 6
WC | (Australia) A Parnaby | 3 | 3
WC | (Australia) A Bozovic | 5 | 6 | 4
WC | (Australia) S Mendez | 7 | 3 | 6
(Australia) A Sharma | 6 | 6
8 | (United Kingdom) K Dunne | 2 | 2
4 | (Australia) O Rogowska | 6 | 6
(Papua New Guinea) A Tere-Apisah | 2 | 2
(Australia) A Bai | 3 | 6^{6}
WC | (Australia) O Tjandramulia | 6 | 7^{8}
(Australia) A Myers | 4 | 0
Q | (France) I Ramialison | 6 | 6
(Japan) E Hozumi | 6 | 0 | 5
6 | (Australia) E Perez | 4 | 6 | 7

Second round
1 | (Australia) Ar Rodionova | 6 | 6^{3} | 3
(Japan) R Ozaki | 4 | 7^{7} | 6
WC | (Australia) S Mendez | 2 | 3
(Australia) A Sharma | 6 | 6
4 | (Australia) O Rogowska | 6 | 6
WC | (Australia) O Tjandramulia | 4 | 2
Q | (France) I Ramialison | 6 | 4 | 6
6 | (Australia) E Perez | 4 | 6 | 4

Quarterfinals
(Japan) R Ozaki | 4 | 6 | 0
(Australia) A Sharma | 6 | 3 | 6
4 | (Australia) O Rogowska | 6 | 6
Q | (France) I Ramialison | 3 | 2

Semifinals
(Australia) A Sharma | 1 | 4
4 | (Australia) O Rogowska | 6 | 6

=== Bottom half ===
First round
7 | (Australia) D Aiava | 7^{7} | 0 | 5
(China) S Xu | 6^{4} | 6 | 7
Q | (Australia) M Inglis | 3 | 3
(Australia) N Bains | 6 | 6
Q | (United Kingdom) JA Burrage | 6 | 3 | 5
(Australia) Z Hives | 3 | 6 | 7
(Japan) M Imanishi | 2 | 3
3 | (Australia) P Hon | 6 | 6
5 | (Australia) J Fourlis | 7^{7} | 3 | 1
(Australia) K Birrell | 6^{2} | 6 | 6
(Australia) K McPhee | 6 | 6
(Japan) M Minokoshi | 4 | 4
(Australia) I Wallace | 7 | 6
(Japan) J Namigata | 5 | 3
(Australia) L Cabrera | 6 | 0 | 6
2 | (United Kingdom) G Taylor | 4 | 6 | 2

Second round
(China) S Xu | 3 | 6 | 4
(Australia) N Bains | 6 | 2 | 6
(Australia) Z Hives | 6 | 6
3 | (Australia) P Hon | 4 | 4
(Australia) K Birrell | 6^{2} | 4
(Australia) K McPhee | 7^{7} | 6
(Australia) I Wallace | 6 | 4 | 6
(Australia) L Cabrera | 1 | 6 | 2

Quarterfinals
(Australia) N Bains | 6 | 3 | 5
(Australia) Z Hives | 4 | 6 | 7
(Australia) K McPhee | 6^{5} | 6 | 0
(Australia) I Wallace | 7^{7} | 4 | 6

Semifinals
(Australia) Z Hives | 4 | 6 | 6
(Australia) I Wallace | 6 | 3 | 4
