= 2017 Canberra Tennis International – Men's doubles =

Men's doubles
- 2017 Canberra Tennis International

Final
- Champions: (Australia) Alex Bolt (Australia) Bradley Mousley
- Runners-up: (Australia) Luke Saville (Australia) Andrew Whittington
- Score: 6–3, 6–2

Events
Singles	men	women
Doubles	men	women
- Canberra Tennis International

Luke Saville and Jordan Thompson were the defending champions but only Saville chose to defend his title, partnering Andrew Whittington. Saville lost in the final to Alex Bolt and Bradley Mousley.

Bolt and Mousley won the title after defeating Saville and Whittington 6–3, 6–2.

== Seeds ==
1. (Australia) Steven de Waard / (Australia) Matt Reid (semifinals)
2. (Australia) Luke Saville / (Australia) Andrew Whittington (final)
3. (Australia) Alex Bolt / (Australia) Bradley Mousley (champions)
4. (Australia) Marc Polmans / (New Zealand) Rubin Statham (quarterfinals)

== Draw ==
Key

- Q = Qualifier
- WC = Wild card
- LL = Lucky loser
- Alt = Alternate
- ITF = ITF entry
- PR = Protected ranking
- SR = Special ranking
- SE = Special exempt
- JE = Junior exempt
- JR = Junior Accelerator Programme entrant
- CO = College Accelerator Programme entrant
- NG = Next Gen Accelerator Program entrant
- w/o = Walkover
- r = Retired
- d = Defaulted

First round
1	(Australia) S de Waard (Australia) M Reid	6	6
(Australia) H Bourchier (Australia) D Kelly	3	4
(United Kingdom) B Klein (Australia) D Propoggia	7	6
WC	(Australia) J Frawley (Australia) Jacob Grills	5	4
3	(Australia) A Bolt (Australia) B Mousley	6	6
(Germany) S Fanselow (United States) A Sarkissian	4	4
WC	(Australia) J Kubler (Australia) B Mitchell	7	7^{7}
Alt	(Brazil) A Ghem (Brazil) T Turini	5	6^{5}
(Australia) M Banes (Australia) Gavin van Peperzeel	6	6
(United States) E King (United States) N Pasha	4	4
WC	(Australia) B Ellis (Australia) C Puttergill	1	3
4	(Australia) M Polmans (New Zealand) R Statham	6	6
(Australia) A Harris (Australia) O Jasika	7^{7}	1	[8]
(Philippines) F Alcantara (Netherlands) S Verbeek	6^{5}	6	[10]
(Austria) L Miedler (Australia) S Puodziunas	6	6^{9}	[8]
2	(Australia) L Saville (Australia) A Whittington	4	7^{11}	[10]

Quarterfinals
1	(Australia) S de Waard (Australia) M Reid	7^{8}	6^{4}	[10]
(United Kingdom) B Klein (Australia) D Propoggia	6^{6}	7^{7}	[8]
3	(Australia) A Bolt (Australia) B Mousley	6	6^{9}	[10]
WC	(Australia) J Kubler (Australia) B Mitchell	3	7^{11}	[6]
(Australia) M Banes (Australia) G van Peperzeel	7^{7}	2	[10]
4	(Australia) M Polmans (New Zealand) R Statham	6^{2}	6	[7]
(Philippines) F Alcantara (Netherlands) S Verbeek	6^{6}	6	[6]
2	(Australia) L Saville (Australia) A Whittington	7^{8}	4	[10]

Semifinals
1	(Australia) S de Waard (Australia) M Reid	4	2
3	(Australia) A Bolt (Australia) B Mousley	6	6
(Australia) M Banes (Australia) G van Peperzeel	3	4
2	(Australia) L Saville (Australia) A Whittington	6	6

Final
3	(Australia) A Bolt (Australia) B Mousley	6	6
2	(Australia) L Saville (Australia) A Whittington	3	2
