= Joanna Garland =

Taiwanese tennis player (born 2001)

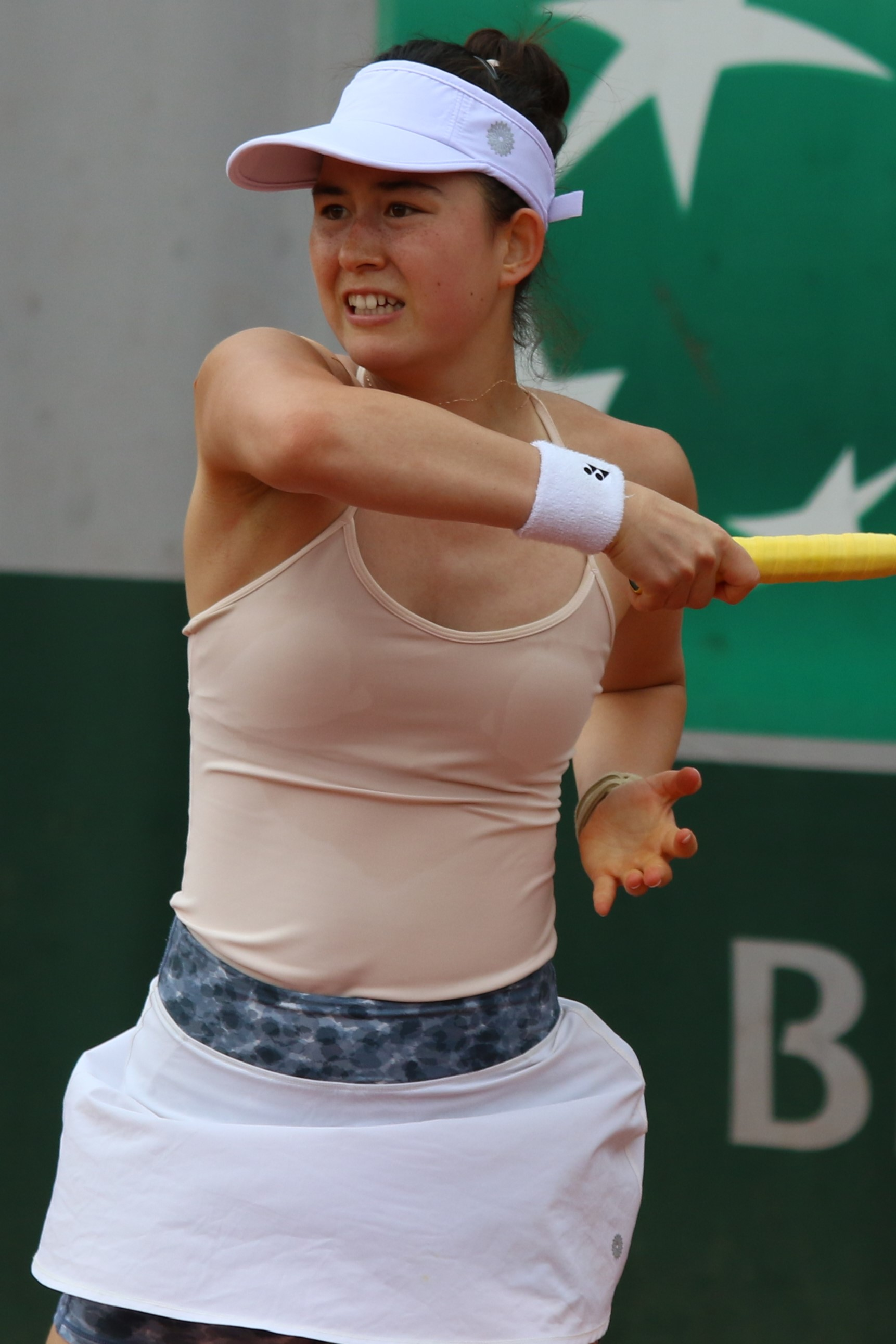
- Garland at the 2023 French Open
- Country (sports): Chinese Taipei
- Born: 16 July 2001 (age 25) Stevenage, England, UK
- Plays: Right (two-handed backhand)
- Prize money: $404,934

Singles
- Career record: 268–124
- Career titles: 1 WTA 125
- Highest ranking: No. 117 (12 January 2026)
- Current ranking: No. 196 (2 November 2026)

Grand Slam singles results
- Australian Open: Q1 (2026)
- French Open: 2R (2025)
- Wimbledon: Q3 (2025)
- US Open: Q3 (2026)

Doubles
- Career record: 34–27
- Career titles: 3 ITF
- Highest ranking: No. 406 (3 April 2023)
- Last updated on: 15 January 2026.

Joanna Garland (Chinese: 葛藍喬安娜; born 16 July 2001) is a Taiwanese professional tennis player. She has a career-high WTA singles ranking of world No. 117, achieved on 12 January 2026. Garland is the current No. 1 Taiwanese singles player.

Garland has won 16 singles and three doubles titles on the ITF Circuit.

== Early life ==
Garland is half-British and half-Taiwanese. Born in Stevenage, England, she moved with her family to Taiwan when she was ten years old.

In 2016 she won the Taiwan national U18 tennis championship. By this time, Garland's parents had returned to Stevenage to look after Garland's grandparents, and took Joanna's brothers with them. Garland stayed in Kaohsiung, living with her aunt, to pursue tennis and continue her schooling, as well as competing on the ITF Junior Circuit in Asia.

== Career ==
=== Junior years ===
Coached by Hamid Hejazi, Garland had a very successful junior career and achieved her highest junior ranking of 14 on 26 February 2018. Garland reached the quarter-finals of the girls' singles at the 2018 French Open with wins over Gabriella Price, Viktoriia Dema, and Zheng Qinwen, before losing to Leylah Fernandez. She reached the third round of the girls' singles at the 2018 Wimbledon, before losing to Emma Raducanu. At the 2018 US Open, she reached the semifinals of the girls' doubles alongside Moyuka Uchijima but they lost to Coco Gauff and Caty McNally.

=== Professional ===
Garland defeated Katie Boulter in Thailand in October 2019 as she transitioned from junior to senior tournaments. In October 2020, she beat Boulter to win her first professional title, at a $15k event in Sharm El Sheikh.

In August 2022, Garland won her first 25k level titles with victory at tournaments in England at Foxhills, Surrey and Aldershot. With these victories she became Taiwan's highest ranked female singles player, and pushed her world ranking into the top-300.

In October 2022, she won a W25 doubles title in Loughborough alongside Gabriela Knutson. In December 2022, she qualified for the WTA 125 tournament in Angers, before losing in three sets to Viktoriya Tomova.

Garland won the W35 Nairobi in January 2025, defeating Angella Okutoyi in straight sets in the final.

Ranked No. 177, Garland made her major debut at the 2025 French Open, after qualifying for her first main draw with a win over Anna-Lena Friedsam. She defeated Katie Volynets in the first round; recording her first major match win, before losing to Yulia Putintseva in the second round.

At the 2025 Chennai Open, she reached her first WTA Tour semifinal with wins over qualifiers Arianne Hartono and Mei Yamaguchi then overcoming lucky loser Arina Rodionova, before losing in the last four to seventh seed Kimberly Birrell, after letting slip a 5–0 lead in the third set and failing to convert on any of her five match points.

Garland won her first WTA 125 title at the 2026 Canberra Tennis International, defeating Polina Kudermetova in the final. In August, she reached the final rounds of qualifiers for the 2026 US Open, losing to Fran Jones of Great Britain.

== Exhibition events ==
At the 2026 Australian Open, she reached the finals of the 1 Point Slam exhibition event before losing to amateur player Jordan Smith (who won $1 million in prize money as the champion). Her path to the final involved one-point victories over Alexander Zverev, Nick Kyrgios, Maria Sakkari and Donna Vekic.

== Performance timeline ==
Key
W	F	SF	QF	#R	RR	Q#	P#	DNQ	A	Z#	PO	G	S	B	NMS	NTI	P	NH

(W) winner; (F) finalist; (SF) semifinalist; (QF) quarterfinalist; (#R) rounds 4, 3, 2, 1; (RR) round-robin stage; (Q#) qualification round; (P#) preliminary round; (DNQ) did not qualify; (A) absent; (Z#) Davis/Fed Cup Zonal Group (with number indication) or (PO) play-off; (G) gold, (S) silver or (B) bronze Olympic/Paralympic medal; (NMS) not a Masters tournament; (NTI) not a Tier I tournament; (P) postponed; (NH) not held; (SR) strike rate (events won / competed); (W–L) win–loss record.
To avoid confusion and double counting, these charts are updated at the conclusion of a tournament or when the player's participation has ended.

Tournament	2025	2026	W–L
Australian Open	A	Q1	0–0
French Open	2R	Q1	1–1
Wimbledon	Q3	Q2	0–0
US Open	Q1	Q3	0–0
Win–loss	1–1	0–0	1–1

== WTA Challenger finals ==
=== Singles: 1 (1 title) ===
Result	W–L	Date	Tournament	Surface	Opponent	Score
Win	1–0	Jan 2026	Canberra Tennis International, Australia	Hard	(Uzbekistan) Polina Kudermetova	6–4, 6–2

== ITF Circuit finals ==
=== Singles: 25 (18 titles, 7 runner-ups) ===
Legend W60/75 tournaments (2–1) W50 tournaments W25/35 tournaments (12–2) W15 tournaments (4–4)	Finals by surface Hard (10–7) Clay (2–0) Grass (1–0) Carpet (5–0)

Result	W–L	Date	Tournament	Tier	Surface	Opponent	Score
Loss	0–1	Dec 2018	ITF Ortisei, Italy	W15	Hard (i)	(Switzerland) Simona Waltert	4–6, 2–6
Loss	0–2	Oct 2020	ITF Sharm El Sheikh, Egypt	W15	Hard	(Egypt) Sandra Samir	4–6, 2–6
Win	1–2	Oct 2020	ITF Sharm El Sheikh, Egypt	W15	Hard	(United Kingdom) Katie Boulter	6–3, 3–6, 6–3
Loss	1–3	Nov 2020	ITF Sharm El Sheikh, Egypt	W15	Hard	(Croatia) Lea Bošković	4–6, 4–6
Win	2–3	Nov 2020	ITF Sharm El Sheikh, Egypt	W15	Hard	(Switzerland) Lulu Sun	7–5, 6–3
Loss	2–4	Mar 2022	ITF Monastir, Tunisia	W15	Hard	(Japan) Sakura Hosogi	4–6, 6–1, 3–6
Win	3–4	Apr 2022	ITF Monastir, Tunisia	W15	Hard	(Hungary) Rebeka Stolmár	7–5, 6–1
Loss	3–5	May 2022	ITF Nottingham, UK	W25	Hard	(United Kingdom) Sonay Kartal	3–6, 1–6
Win	4–5	Aug 2022	ITF Foxhills, UK	W25	Hard	(Japan) Kyōka Okamura	3–6, 6–1, 6–2
Win	5–5	Aug 2022	ITF Aldershot, UK	W25	Hard	(India) Ankita Raina	6–2, 6–4
Win	6–5	Feb 2023	ITF Swan Hill, Australia	W25	Grass	(China) Wang Yafan	6–3, 4–6, 7–6^{(7)}
Win	7–5	Oct 2023	ITF Hamamatsu, Japan	W25	Carpet (i)	(Japan) Ayano Shimizu	6–2, 4–6, 6–4
Loss	7–6	Oct 2023	Playford International, Australia	W60	Hard	(Australia) Astra Sharma	6–7^{(6)}, 0–6
Win	8–6	Oct 2024	ITF Kayseri, Turkey	W35	Hard	(Turkey) Çağla Büyükakçay	6–1, 7–6^{(1)}
Win	9–6	Nov 2024	ITF Solarino, Italy	W35	Carpet	(Greece) Valentini Grammatikopoulou	5–7, 6–2, 6–3
Win	10–6	Nov 2024	ITF Solarino, Italy	W35	Carpet	(Italy) Giorgia Pedone	6–2, 6–3
Win	11–6	Nov 2024	ITF Sharm El Sheikh, Egypt	W15	Hard	(Latvia) Kamilla Bartone	6–1, 6–1
Win	12–6	Dec 2024	ITF Sharm El Sheikh, Egypt	W35	Hard	(Belgium) Hanne Vandewinkel	6–4, 6–2
Loss	12–7	Dec 2024	ITF Sharm El Sheikh, Egypt	W35	Hard	(Russia) Anastasia Gasanova	3–6, 6–7^{(1)}
Win	13–7	Dec 2024	ITF Nairobi, Kenya	W35	Clay	(Netherlands) Lian Tran	6–1, 6–1
Win	14–7	Jan 2025	ITF Nairobi, Kenya	W35	Clay	(Kenya) Angella Okutoyi	6–1, 6–4
Win	15–7	Mar 2025	ITF Solarino, Italy	W35	Carpet	(Poland) Weronika Falkowska	6–1, 6–2
Win	16–7	Mar 2025	ITF Solarino, Italy	W35	Carpet	(Slovakia) Viktória Hrunčáková	7–6^{(4)}, 6–2
Win	17–7	Aug 2026	ITF Tianjin, China	W75	Hard	Darya Astakhova	6–3, 6–2
Win	18–7	Nov 2026	River City Challenger, Australia	W75	Hard	(United States) Carol Young Suh Lee	5–7, 6–1, 6–2

=== Doubles: 5 (3 titles, 2 runner-ups) ===
Legend W25 tournaments (1–0) W15 tournaments (2–2)	Finals by surface Hard (2–2) Clay (1–0)

Result	W–L	Date	Tournament	Tier	Surface	Partner	Opponents	Score
Win	1–0	Jul 2018	ITF Taipei, Taiwan	W15	Hard	(Chinese Taipei) Lee Hua-chen	(Chinese Taipei) Chan Chin-wei (Japan) Kotomi Takahata	6–1, 3–6, [10–1]
Loss	1–1	Aug 2018	ITF Gimcheon, South Korea	W15	Hard	(United Kingdom) Emily Appleton	(South Korea) Jung So-hee (South Korea) Kim Mi-ok	7–6^{(5)}, 6–7^{(5)}, [12–14]
Loss	1–2	Dec 2018	ITF Hua Hin, Thailand	W15	Hard	(Thailand) Mananchaya Sawangkaew	(Indonesia) Nadia Ravita (Indonesia) Aldila Sutjiadi	2–6, 4–6
Win	2–2	Feb 2019	ITF Palmanova, Spain	W15	Clay	(Poland) Anna Hertel	(Venezuela) Luniuska Delgado (Russia) Daniella Medvedeva	7–5, 6–0
Win	3–2	Oct 2022	GB Pro-Series Loughborough, United Kingdom	W25	Hard	(Czech Republic) Gabriela Knutson	(Poland) Martyna Kubka (Estonia) Elena Malygina	6–3, 6–3

== Longest winning streak ==
=== 29-match win streak (2024) ===
#	Tournament	Category	Start date	Surface	Rd	Opponent	Rank	Score
–	ITF Kayseri, Turkey	W50	14 October 2024	Hard	2R	Aliona Falei	No. 209	2–6, 3–6
1	ITF Kayseri, Turkey	W35	21 October 2024	Hard	1R	Arina Bulatova	No. 587	6–4, 6–3
2	ITF Kayseri, Turkey	W35	21 October 2024	Hard	2R	(Georgia (country)) Zoziya Kardava	No. 744	6–1, 6–4
3	ITF Kayseri, Turkey	W35	21 October 2024	Hard	QF	(Slovenia) Dalila Jakupovic	No. 227	6–0, 6–4
4	ITF Kayseri, Turkey	W35	21 October 2024	Hard	SF	Daria Egorova	No. 625	4–6, 7–6^{(3)}. 6–1
5	ITF Kayseri, Turkey	W35	21 October 2024	Hard	F (1)	(Turkey) Çağla Büyükakçay	No. 366	6–1, 7–6^{(1)}
6	ITF Solarino, Italy	W35	4 November 2024	Carpet	1R	(Italy) Beatrice Ricci	No. 391	7–5, 6–0
7	ITF Solarino, Italy	W35	4 November 2024	Carpet	2R	(Italy) Noemi Basiletti	No. 916	6–2, 7–6^{(3)}
8	ITF Solarino, Italy	W35	4 November 2024	Carpet	QF	(Italy) Giorgia Pedone	No. 196	6–2, 6–0
9	ITF Solarino, Italy	W35	4 November 2024	Carpet	SF	(Slovakia) Katarína Kužmová	No. 360	1–6, 6–2, 6–2
10	ITF Solarino, Italy	W35	4 November 2024	Carpet	F (2)	(Greece) Valentini Grammatikopoulou	No. 446	5–7, 6–2, 6–3
11	ITF Solarino, Italy	W35	11 November 2024	Clay	1R	(Italy) Beatrice Ricci	No. 391	6–3, 6–0
12	ITF Solarino, Italy	W35	11 November 2024	Clay	2R	(Italy) Vittoria Paganetti	No. 825	6–1, 1–6, 6–2
13	ITF Solarino, Italy	W35	11 November 2024	Clay	QF	(Slovenia) Dalila Jakupovic	No. 227	6–1, 7–6^{(5)}
14	ITF Solarino, Italy	W35	11 November 2024	Clay	SF	(Italy) Samira De Stefano	No. 582	6–7^{(7)}, 6–1, 6–1
15	ITF Solarino, Italy	W35	11 November 2024	Clay	F (3)	(Italy) Giorgia Pedone	No. 196	6–2, 6–3
16	ITF Sharm El Sheikh, Egypt	W15	25 November 2024	Hard	1R	(Germany) Ann Akasha Ceuca	n/a	2–6, 6–0, 6–2
17	ITF Sharm El Sheikh, Egypt	W15	25 November 2024	Hard	2R	(Germany) Maya Drozd	No. 1175	6–0, 6–4
18	ITF Sharm El Sheikh, Egypt	W15	25 November 2024	Hard	QF	(Kosovo) Arlinda Rushiti	No. 558	6–4, 4–6, 6–3
19	ITF Sharm El Sheikh, Egypt	W15	25 November 2024	Hard	SF	(Netherlands) Loes Ebeling Koning	No. 734	6–3, 6–3
20	ITF Sharm El Sheikh, Egypt	W15	25 November 2024	Hard	F (4)	(Latvia) Kamilla Bartone	No. 552	6–1, 6–1
21	ITF Sharm El Sheikh, Egypt	W35	2 December 2024	Hard	1R	(Romania) Maria Sara Popa	No. 444	6–1, 6–0
22	ITF Sharm El Sheikh, Egypt	W35	2 December 2024	Hard	2R	(Slovakia) Katarína Kužmová	No. 360	2–6, 6–1, 6–4
23	ITF Sharm El Sheikh, Egypt	W35	2 December 2024	Hard	QF	(Bulgaria) Rositsa Dencheva	No. 502	6–3, 6–2
24	ITF Sharm El Sheikh, Egypt	W35	2 December 2024	Hard	SF	(Bulgaria) Isabella Shinikova	No. 338	6–7^{(3)}, 6–4, 6–1
25	ITF Sharm El Sheikh, Egypt	W35	2 December 2024	Hard	F (5)	(Belgium) Hanne Vandewinkel	No. 224	6–4, 6–2
26	ITF Sharm El Sheikh, Egypt	W35	9 December 2024	Hard	1R	(Romania) Maria Sara Popa	No. 444	6–0, 6–0
27	ITF Sharm El Sheikh, Egypt	W35	9 December 2024	Hard	2R	Polina Iatcenko	No. 542	6–2, 6–1
28	ITF Sharm El Sheikh, Egypt	W35	9 December 2024	Hard	QF	(Latvia) Kamilla Bartone	No. 552	5–7, 6–3, 6–4
29	ITF Sharm El Sheikh, Egypt	W35	9 December 2024	Hard	SF	(Bulgaria) Rositsa Dencheva	No. 502	6–3, 6–3
–	ITF Sharm El Sheikh, Egypt	W35	9 December 2024	Hard	F (6)	Anastasia Gasanova	No. 413	3–6, 6–7^{(1)}

== Head to head ==
=== Top 5 highest-rank wins ===
#	Tournament	Category	Start date	Surface	Rd	Opponent	Rank	Score	JGR
1	French Open, France	Grand Slam	26 May 2025	Clay	1R	(United States) Katie Volynets	No. 65	6–3, 3–6, 6–4	No. 175
2	Suzhou WTA 125, China	WTA 125	29 September 2025	Hard	1R	(Italy) Lucia Bronzetti	No. 73	6–3, 7–5	No. 134
3	Japan Women's Open, Japan	WTA 250	13 October 2025	Hard	Q2	(United States) Caty McNally	No. 88	6–1, 6–3	No. 132
4	Libéma Open, Netherlands	WTA 250	9 June 2025	Grass	Q2	Aliaksandra Sasnovich	No. 105	6–0, 6–3	No. 147
5	Canberra Tennis International, Australia	WTA 125	5 January 2026	Hard	1R	(France) Diane Parry	No. 122	5–7, 6–4, 6–2	No. 129

- statistics correct as of 10 January 2026

Sporting positions
Preceded by (Serbia) Olga Danilović / (Russia) Anastasia Potapova	Orange Bowl Girls' Doubles Champion; 2017; With: (Japan) Naho Sato	Succeeded by (Hungary) Adrienn Nagy / (South Korea) Park So-hyun
