= Canberra Tennis International =

Tennis tournament held in Australia

Canberra International
- 2026 Canberra Tennis International

Tournament information
- Event name: Workday Canberra International (2024-), P2 Advisory Canberra International (2023), APIS Canberra International (2018)
- Location: Canberra, Australia; Canberra; Australia
- Venue: Canberra Tennis Centre
- Surface: Hard
- Website: Website

Current champions (2026)
- Men's singles: (Belgium) Alexander Blockx
- Women's singles: (Chinese Taipei) Joanna Garland
- Men's doubles: (United States) Mac Kiger (United States) Reese Stalder
- Women's doubles: Maria Kozyreva; Iryna Shymanovich
ATP Tour
- Category: ATP Challenger 125 (2024-)
- Draw: 32S / 16Q / 16D
- Prize money: $225,000 (2026)
WTA Tour
- Category: WTA 125
- Draw: 32S / 16Q / 16D
- Prize money: $225,000

The Workday Canberra International (formerly P2 Advisory and Apis Canberra International) is a tournament for professional male and female tennis players played on outdoor hardcourts. The event is classified as an ATP Challenger Tour 125 and a WTA 125. The tournament has been staged in Canberra, Australia, since 2015.

In 2023, the women's edition was held as a $60,000 ITF Women's Circuit tournament. Prior to that, the women's edition was held as a $25,000 ITF tournament.

For the historical winners of this event see the ACT Open played at the Canberra Tennis Center from 1929 to 2006.

== Finals ==
=== Men's singles ===
Year	Champion	Runner-up	Score
2015	(Australia) Benjamin Mitchell	(Australia) Luke Saville	5–7, 6–0, 6–1
2016	(Australia) James Duckworth	(Australia) Marc Polmans	7–5, 6–3
2017	(Australia) Matthew Ebden	(Japan) Taro Daniel	7–6^{(7–4)}, 6–4
2018	(Australia) Jordan Thompson	(Spain) Nicola Kuhn	6–1, 5–7, 6–4
2020	Held in Bendigo, see Canberra Challenger		
2021–22	Not held		
2023	(Hungary) Márton Fucsovics	(Switzerland) Leandro Riedi	7–5, 6–4
2024	(Germany) Dominik Koepfer	(Czech Republic) Jakub Menšík	6–3, 6–2
2025	(Brazil) João Fonseca	(United States) Ethan Quinn	6–4, 6–4
2026	(Belgium) Alexander Blockx	(Spain) Rafael Jódar	6–4, 6–4

=== Women's singles ===
Year	Champion	Runner-up	Score
2015	(United States) Asia Muhammad	(Japan) Eri Hozumi	6–4, 6–3
2016	(Japan) Risa Ozaki	(Italy) Georgia Brescia	6–4, 6–4
2017	(Australia) Olivia Rogowska	(Australia) Destanee Aiava	6–1, 6–2
2018	(Australia) Zoe Hives	(Australia) Olivia Rogowska	6–4, 6–2
2019	Not held		
2020 (Note: Held in Bendigo)	(Poland) Magdalena Fręch	(Romania) Patricia Maria Țig	walkover
2021–22	Not held		
↓ ITF60 ↓
2023	(United Kingdom) Katie Boulter	(United Kingdom) Jodie Burrage	3–6, 6–3, 6–2
↓ WTA125 ↓
2024	(Spain) Nuria Párrizas Díaz	(United Kingdom) Harriet Dart	6–4, 6–3
2025	(Japan) Aoi Ito	(China) Wei Sijia	6–4, 6–3
2026	(Chinese Taipei) Joanna Garland	(Uzbekistan) Polina Kudermetova	6–4, 6–2

=== Men's doubles ===
Year	Champions	Runners-up	Score
2026	(United States) Mac Kiger (United States) Reese Stalder	(Australia) Blake Bayldon (Australia) Patrick Harper	7–6^{(7–3)}, 6–3
2025	(United States) Ryan Seggerman (United States) Eliot Spizzirri	(France) Pierre-Hugues Herbert (Switzerland) Jérôme Kym	1–6, 7–5, [10–5]
2024	(Spain) Daniel Rincón (Jordan) Abdullah Shelbayh	(Sweden) André Göransson (France) Albano Olivetti	7–6^{(7–4)}, 6–3
2023	(Sweden) André Göransson (Japan) Ben McLachlan	(Australia) Andrew Harris (Australia) John-Patrick Smith	6–3, 5–7, [10–5]
2021–22	Not held		
2020	Held in Bendigo		
2018	(United Kingdom) Evan Hoyt (Chinese Taipei) Wu Tung-lin	(Australia) Jeremy Beale (Australia) Thomas Fancutt	7–6^{(7–5)}, 5–7, [10–8]
2017	(Australia) Alex Bolt (Australia) Bradley Mousley	(Australia) Luke Saville (Australia) Andrew Whittington	6–3, 6–2
2016	(Australia) Luke Saville (Australia) Jordan Thompson	(Australia) Matt Reid (Australia) John-Patrick Smith	6–2, 6–3
2015	(Australia) Alex Bolt (Australia) Andrew Whittington	(United Kingdom) Brydan Klein (Australia) Dane Propoggia	7–6^{(7–2)}, 6–3

=== Women's doubles ===
Year	Champions	Runners-up	Score
2026	Maria Kozyreva; Iryna Shymanovich	(Japan) Ena Shibahara; Vera Zvonareva	6–7^{(9–11)}, 7–5, [10–8]
2025	(Australia) Jaimee Fourlis (Australia) Petra Hule	(Latvia) Darja Semeņistaja (Serbia) Nina Stojanović	7–5, 4–6, [10–6]
2024	(Slovenia) Veronika Erjavec (Latvia) Darja Semeņistaja	(Australia) Kaylah McPhee (Australia) Astra Sharma	6–2, 6–4
↑ WTA125 ↑
2023	Irina Khromacheva; Anastasia Tikhonova	(United States) Robin Anderson (United States) Hailey Baptiste	6–4, 7–5
↑ ITF60 ↑
2021–22	Not held		
2020 (Note: Held in Bendigo)	(Australia) Alison Bai (Australia) Jaimee Fourlis	(Hungary) Anna Bondár (Turkey) Pemra Özgen	5–7, 6–4, [10–8]
2019	Not held		
2018	(Australia) Ellen Perez (Australia) Arina Rodionova (2)	(Australia) Destanee Aiava (Australia) Naiktha Bains	6–7^{(5–7)}, 6–3, [10–7]
2017	(United States) Asia Muhammad (Australia) Arina Rodionova	(Australia) Jessica Moore (Australia) Ellen Perez	6–4, 6–4
2016	(Australia) Jessica Moore (Australia) Storm Sanders	(Australia) Alison Bai (Australia) Lizette Cabrera	6–3, 6–4
2015	(Japan) Eri Hozumi (Japan) Misa Eguchi	(United States) Lauren Embree (United States) Asia Muhammad	7–6^{(15–13)}, 1–6, [14–12]
